= 2023 junior college football season =

American junior college football season

- National Championship: Red Grange Bowl, Glen Ellyn, IL, (NJCAA D-III)
- Champion(s): Iowa Western (NJCAA D-I); DuPage (NJCAA D-III); Riverside City (3C2A)

The 2023 junior college football season was the season of intercollegiate junior college football running from September to December 2023. The season ended with three national champions: two from the National Junior College Athletic Association's (NJCAA) Division I and Division III and one from the California Community College Athletic Association (3C2A).

The NJCAA Division I champion was Iowa Western who defeated East Mississippi 61–14 in the NJCAA National Football Championship. The NJCAA Division III champion was DuPage who defeated Rochester C&T 33–29 in the Red Grange Bowl. The 3C2A champion was Riverside City who defeated San Mateo 24–21 in the 3C2A State Championship.

== Conference changes and new programs ==
=== Membership changes ===
Team	Former conference	New conference	Source
Antelope Valley	American Pacific (APL)	National Northern (NNL)	
ASA Miami	D-III independent	School closed	
Chaffey	National Central (NCL)	American Metro (AML)	
Citrus	American Metro (AML)	National Central (NCL)	
Compton	American Mountain (AML)	American Metro (AML)	
Desert	American Mountain (AML)	American Metro (AML)	
East Los Angeles	National Northern (NNL)	National Central (NCL)	
El Camino	National Central (NCL)	National Northern (NNL)	
Glendale (CA)	American Metro (AML)	American Pacific (APL)	
Golden West	National Southern (NSL)	National Central (NCL)	
Grossmont	American Mountain (AML)	National Southern (NSL)	
Long Beach City	National Northern (NNL)	National Central (NCL)	
Los Angeles Southwest	American Metro (AML)	American Pacific (APL)	
Moorpark	American Pacific (APL)	National Northern (NNL)	
Mt. San Jacinto	American Mountain (AML)	National Southern (NSL)	
Orange Coast	American Metro (AML)	National Central (NCL)	
Pasadena City	American Mountain (AML)	American Pacific (APL)	
Riverside City	National Central (NCL)	National Southern (NSL)	
San Bernardino Valley	National Southern (NSL)	National Central (NCL)	
Santa Barbara City	American Pacific (APL)	National Northern (NNL)	
Victor Valley	American Mountain (AML)	American Metro (AML)	

== Top 5 matchups ==
Rankings are based on the NJCAA Division I, NJCAA Division III, and 3C2A polls.

=== Regular season ===
- Week 2
  - No. 1 (D3) DuPage defeated No. 4 (D3) Rochester C&T, 24–21 (Rochester Regional Stadium and Bubble, Rochester, Minnesota)
- Week 3
  - No. 1 (D1) Hutchinson defeated No. 5 (D1) Iowa Central, 27–2 (Dodger Stadium, Fort Dodge, Iowa)
  - No. 2 (D3) NDSCS defeated No. 3 (D3) Minnesota State C&T, 30–14 (Fergus Falls, Minnesota)
- Week 4
  - No. 1 (D3) DuPage defeated No. 2 (D3) NDSCS, 38–31 (Frank Vertin Field, Wahpeton, North Dakota)
  - No. 3 (D3) Rochester C&T defeated No. 5t (D3) Mesabi Range, 37–21 (Virginia, Minnesota)
  - No. 1 (3C2A) San Mateo defeated No. 5 (3C2A) American River, 24–23 (College Heights Stadium, San Mateo, California)
- Week 5
  - No. 2 (D1) Iowa Western defeated No. 1 (D3) DuPage, 41–14 (Bob MacDougall Field, Glen Ellyn, Illinois)
- Week 7
  - No. 2 (D1) Iowa Western defeated No. 5 (D1) Snow, 20–13 (Terry Foote Stadium, Ephraim, Utah)
  - No. 4 (D3) Rochester C&T defeated No. 2 (D3) NDSCS, 28–27 (Frank Vertin Field, Wahpeton, North Dakota)
- Week 8
  - No. 3 (D3) NDSCS defeated No. 4 (D3) Mesabi Range, 14–7 (Frank Vertin Field, Wahpeton, North Dakota)
- Week 9
  - No. 3 (D1) Kilgore defeated No. 4 (D1) Trinity Valley, 37–17 (R. E. St. John Memorial Stadium, Kilgore, Texas)
- Week 10
  - No. 5 (3C2A) San Mateo defeated No. 1 (3C2A) CC of San Francisco, 44–17 (College Heights Stadium, San Mateo, California)
  - No. 4 (3C2A) Fullerton defeated No. 2 (3C2A) Riverside City, 17–16 (Wheelock Stadium, Riverside, California)
- Week 12
  - No. 1 (D1) Hutchinson defeated No. 2 (D1) Iowa Western, 42–28 (Gowans Stadium, Hutchinson, Kansas)

=== Conference playoffs ===
- MCAC playoffs
  - No. 3 (D3) NDSCS defeated No. 4 (D3) Mesabi Range, 21–17 (Frank Vertin Field, Wahpeton, North Dakota)
  - No. 2 (D3) Rochester C&T defeated No. 3 (D3) NDSCS, 24–16 (Husky Stadium, St. Cloud, Minnesota)

=== Postseason ===
- NJCAA Division I Semifinal
  - No. 4 (D1) East Mississippi defeated No. 1 (D1) Hutchinson, 27–23 (Gowans Stadium, Hutchinson, Kansas)
  - No. 2 (D1) Iowa Western defeated No. 3 (D1) Kilgore, 47–7, (Titan Stadium, Council Bluffs, Iowa)
- NJCAA Division I Championship
  - No. 2 (D1) Iowa Western defeated No. 4 (D1) East Mississippi, 61–14, (War Memorial Stadium, Little Rock, Arkansas)
- Red Grange Bowl (NJCAA Division III Championship)
  - No. 1 (D3) DuPage defeated No. 2 (D3) Rochester C&T, 33–29 (Bob MacDougall Field, Glen Ellyn, Illinois)
- NCFC playoffs
  - No. 4 (3C2A) American River defeated No. 5 (3C2A) CC of San Francisco, 41–6 (Beaver Stadium, Sacramento, California)
  - No. 3 (3C2A) San Mateo defeated No. 4 (3C2A) American River, 30–27 (College Station Stadium, San Mateo, California)

== NJCAA Division III team wins over NJCAA Division I teams ==
Date	Time	Visiting team	Home team	Site	TV	Result	Attendance	Ref.
August 24	7:00 p.m.	No. 1 DuPage	(D1) Ellsworth	Cadet Football Field • Iowa Falls, Iowa		17–10		
November 4	1:00 p.m.	No. 11 (D1) Georgia Military	No. 1 DuPage	Bob MacDougall Field • Glen Ellyn, Illinois		37–21		
^{#}Rankings from AP Poll released prior to game.

== Upsets ==
This section lists instances of unranked teams defeating NJCAA Division I, NJCAA Division III, and 3C2A-ranked teams during the season.

=== Regular season ===
- Week 1
  - Highland (KS) 20, No. 7 (D1) Coffeyville, 14
- Week 2
  - Monroe 31, No. 5 (D3) Nassau 13
  - Contra Costa 45, No. 23 (3C2A) Feather River 14
  - Bakersfield 29, No. 21 (3C2A) Long Beach City 27
- Week 3
  - Copiah–Lincoln 23, No. 8 (D1) East Mississippi
  - Tyler 52, No. 13 (D1) Georgia Military
  - Mississippi Gulf Coast 49, No. 3 (D1) Northwest Mississippi 14
  - College of the Canyons 17, No. 21 (3C2A) Palomar 7
- Week 4
  - Georgia Military 17, No. 9 (D1) Lackawanna 9
  - Nassau 13, No. 5t (D3) Hudson Valley 6
- Week 5
  - Highland (KS) 3, No. 14 (D1) Garden City 0
  - Navarro 24, No. 3 (D1) Kilgore
  - Allan Hancock 17, No. 25 (3C2A) Moorpark 10
- Week 6
  - Minnesota State C&T 32, No. 3 (D3) Rochester C&T 29
  - Fresno City 31, No. 16 (3C2A) College of the Sequoias 28
  - Allan Hancock 21, No. 19 (3C2A) Bakersfield 13
- Week 7
  - New Mexico Military 31, No. 6 (D1) Tyler 17
  - Mesabi Range 34, No. 3 (D3) Minnesota State C&T 28
- Week 8
  - East Central (MS) 28, No. 9 (D1) Northeast Mississippi
  - Copiah–Lincoln 28, No. 4 (D1) Mississippi Gulf Coast 23
  - Cisco 21, No. 14 (D1) New Mexico Military 10
  - Sacramento City 34, No. 22 (3C2A) Contra Costa 7
- Week 10
  - Mississippi Delta 36, No. 4 (D1) Jones 33
  - Coffeyville 15, No. 13 (D1) Butler (KS) 7
  - Santa Rosa 17, No. 19 (3C2A) Sierra 14
  - Mt. San Jacinto 16, No. 20 (3C2A) Saddleback 13
- Week 11
  - Navarro 34, No. 12 (D1) Tyler 24
  - Nassau 24, No. 5 (D3) Louisburg 21
- Week 12
  - Georgia Military 31, No. 11 (D1) Lackawanna 24

=== Postseason ===
- MCAC playoffs
  - Central Lakes 26, No. 5 (D3) Minnesota State C&T 12
- Bowl games
  - Contra Costa 21, No. 15 (3C2A) Fresno City 14 (Gridiron Classic Bowl)

== Conference standings ==
=== NJCAA Division I ===
2023 Iowa Community College Athletic Conference football standings
	Conf.			Overall
Team	W		L	W		L
No. 1 Iowa Western $^	2	–	0	12	–	1
No. 7 Iowa Central	1	–	1	7	–	4
Ellsworth	0	–	2	2	–	9
$ – Conference champion; ^ – NJCAA Division I playoff participant; Rankings from NJCAA Division I poll

2023 Northeast Football Conference standings
	Conf.			Overall
Team	W		L	W		L
No. 14 Lackawanna $	2	–	0	7	–	3
Monroe	0	–	2	6	–	5
$ – Conference champion; Rankings from NJCAA Division I poll

2023 Kansas Jayhawk Community College Conference football standings
	Conf.			Overall
Team	W		L	W		L
No. 3 Hutchinson $^	6	–	0	10	–	1
No. 6 Dodge City	5	–	1	8	–	3
No. 15 Highland (KS)	3	–	3	6	–	5
Garden City	3	–	3	5	–	6
Butler (KS)	2	–	4	5	–	5
Coffeyville	1	–	5	3	–	7
Independence	1	–	5	2	–	8
$ – Conference champion; ^ – NJCAA Division I playoff participant; Rankings from NJCAA Division I poll

2023 Southwest Junior College Football Conference standings
	Conf.			Overall
Team	W		L	W		L
No. 5 Kilgore †y$^	7	–	1	9	–	2
No. 10 Trinity Valley †	5	–	2	7	–	3
No. 12 Navarro †y	5	–	3	6	–	5
Tyler	4	–	3	5	–	4
New Mexico Military †	4	–	3	6	–	6
Cisco	3	–	4	4	–	4
Blinn	1	–	6	3	–	6
Northeastern Oklahoma A&M	0	–	7	0	–	9
Championship: Kilgore 48, Navarro 39
$ – Conference champion; † – Conference playoff participant; y – Championship game participant; ^ – NJCAA Division I playoff participant; Rankings from NJCAA Division I poll

2023 Mississippi Association of Community Colleges Conference football standings
	Conf.			Overall
Team	W		L	W		L
North Division
No. 2 East Mississippi x†y$^	6	–	0	10	–	3
No. 13 Northwest Mississippi †	5	–	1	7	–	3
Northeast Mississippi	4	–	2	6	–	3
Holmes	3	–	3	6	–	3
Itawamba	2	–	4	3	–	6
Mississippi Delta	1	–	5	2	–	7
Coahoma	0	–	6	1	–	8
South Division
No. 4 Copiah–Lincoln x†y	5	–	1	10	–	2
No. 8 Mississippi Gulf Coast x†	5	–	1	8	–	2
Jones (MS) x	5	–	1	6	–	3
Hinds	3	–	3	3	–	6
East Central (MS)	2	–	4	4	–	5
Pearl River	1	–	5	1	–	8
Southwest Mississippi	0	–	6	1	–	8
Championship: East Mississippi 27, Copiah–Lincoln 20
$ – Conference champion; x – Division champion/co-champions; † – Conference playoff participant; y – Championship game participant; ^ – NJCAA Division I playoff participant; Rankings from NJCAA Division I poll

2023 NJCAA Division I independents football records
	Conf.			Overall
Team	W	L	T	W		L		T
Sussex County		–		8	–	2	–	0
No. 9 Snow		–		9	–	3	–	0
No. 11 Georgia Military		–		7	–	4	–	0
Community Christian (MI)		–		0	–	6	–	2
Community Christian (CA)		–		0	–	3	–	0
Rankings from NJCAA Division I poll

=== NJCAA Division III ===
2023 Minnesota College Athletic Conference football standings
	Conf.			Overall
Team	W		L	W		L
No. 2 Rochester C&T †y$^	5	–	1	8	–	3
No. 3 NDSCS †y	4	–	1	8	–	3
No. 4 Mesabi Range †	4	–	2	5	–	4
Minnesota State C&T †	4	–	2	4	–	4
Central Lakes †	3	–	4	4	–	6
Vermilion †	1	–	5	1	–	6
Minnesota West C&T †	0	–	6	0	–	7
Championship: Rochester C&T 24, NDSCS 16
$ – Conference champion; † – Conference playoff participant; y – Championship game participant; ^ – Red Grange Bowl participant; Rankings from NJCAA Division III poll

2023 NJCAA Division III independents football records
	Conf.			Overall
Team	W	L	T	W		L		T
No. 1 DuPage ^		–		11	–	1	–	0
No. 5 Louisburg		–		5	–	4	–	0
Hudson Valley		–		5	–	5	–	0
Nassau		–		5	–	5	–	0
Erie		–		3	–	7	–	0
Hocking		–		0	–	9	–	2
^ – Red Grange Bowl participate; Rankings from NJCAA Division III poll

=== 3C2A ===
==== SCFA ====
2023 American Metro League standings
	Conf.			Overall
Team	W		L	W		L
No. 23 Chaffey $	5	–	0	11	–	0
Santa Ana	4	–	1	9	–	2
Desert	3	–	2	6	–	5
West Los Angeles	2	–	3	2	–	8
Victor Valley	1	–	4	1	–	9
Compton	0	–	5	0	–	10
$ – Conference champion; Rankings from 3C2A poll

2023 American Pacific League standings
	Conf.			Overall
Team	W		L	W		L
Pasadena City $	5	–	0	9	–	2
Glendale (CA)	3	–	2	6	–	4
Los Angeles Southwest	3	–	2	6	–	4
Santa Monica	3	–	2	5	–	5
Los Angeles Valley	1	–	4	4	–	6
Pierce	0	–	5	3	–	7
$ – Conference champion

2023 National Central League standings
	Conf.			Overall
Team	W		L	W		L
No. 4 Mt. San Antonio $^	7	–	0	10	–	1
No. 9 Golden West	6	–	1	8	–	3
No. 11 Citrus	4	–	3	8	–	3
No. 15 East Los Angeles	4	–	3	7	–	4
No. 21 Cerritos	3	–	4	5	–	5
Long Beach City	3	–	4	4	–	6
Orange Coast	1	–	6	1	–	9
San Bernardino Valley	0	–	7	1	–	9
$ – Conference champion; ^ – 3C2A playoff participant; Rankings from 3C2A poll

2023 National Northern League standings
	Conf.			Overall
Team	W		L	W		L
No. 6 Ventura +^	6	–	1	8	–	4
No. 13 Allan Hancock +	6	–	1	7	–	4
No. 18 College of the Canyons	5	–	2	6	–	5
No. 12 El Camino	4	–	3	7	–	4
No. 20 Bakersfield	4	–	3	6	–	5
Santa Barbara City	2	–	5	4	–	6
Moorpark	1	–	6	3	–	7
Antelope Valley	0	–	7	1	–	9
+ – Conference co-champions; ^ – 3C2A playoff participant; Rankings from 3C2A poll

2023 National Southern League standings
	Conf.			Overall
Team	W		L	W		L
No. 5 Fullerton $^	7	–	0	10	–	1
No. 1 Riverside City ^	6	–	1	12	–	1
No. 14 San Diego Mesa	4	–	3	7	–	4
No. 25 Saddleback	4	–	3	5	–	5
Mt. San Jacinto	4	–	3	4	–	6
Palomar	2	–	5	3	–	7
Southwestern (CA)	1	–	6	1	–	9
Grossmont	0	–	7	0	–	10
$ – Conference champion; ^ – 3C2A playoff participant; Rankings from 3C2A poll

==== NCFC ====
2023 American Golden Coast League standings
	Conf.			Overall
Team	W		L	W		L
Monterey Peninsula $	6	–	0	8	–	3
San Jose City	5	–	1	8	–	2
Hartnell	3	–	3	7	–	4
Cabrillo	3	–	3	6	–	4
West Hills Coalinga	2	–	4	5	–	5
Merced	2	–	4	3	–	7
Gavilan	0	–	6	0	–	10
$ – Conference champion

2023 American Pacific 7 League standings
	Conf.			Overall
Team	W		L	W		L
No. 22 Foothill $	5	–	0	11	–	0
College of the Redwoods	4	–	1	9	–	2
Los Medanos	3	–	2	5	–	5
De Anza	1	–	4	2	–	8
College of the Siskiyous	1	–	4	2	–	8
Yuba	1	–	4	1	–	9
$ – Conference champion; Rankings from 3C2A poll

2023 National Bay 6 League standings
	Conf.			Overall
Team	W		L	W		L
No. 2 San Mateo $^	5	–	0	11	–	2
No. 7 CC of San Francisco ^	4	–	1	9	–	2
Laney	3	–	2	4	–	6
San Joaquin Delta	2	–	3	3	–	7
Diablo Valley	1	–	4	2	–	8
Chabot	0	–	5	0	–	10
$ – Conference champion; ^ – 3C2A playoff participant; Rankings from 3C2A poll

2023 National Norcal League standings
	Conf.			Overall
Team	W		L	W		L
No. 3 American River $^	5	–	0	10	–	2
No. 8 Butte	4	–	1	9	–	2
No. 24 Sierra	2	–	3	5	–	6
Feather River	2	–	3	3	–	7
Santa Rosa	2	–	3	3	–	7
Shasta	0	–	5	1	–	9
$ – Conference champion; ^ – 3C2A playoff participant; Rankings from 3C2A poll

2023 National Valley League standings
	Conf.			Overall
Team	W		L	W		L
No. 10 Modesto $^	5	–	0	7	–	4
No. 17 Fresno City	4	–	1	6	–	5
No. 16 Reedley	3	–	2	7	–	4
No. 19 College of the Sequoias	2	–	3	6	–	5
Sacramento City	1	–	4	4	–	6
Contra Costa	0	–	5	6	–	5
$ – Conference champion; ^ – 3C2A playoff participant; Rankings from 3C2A poll

== Rankings ==
=== Preseason polls ===
NJCAA Division I
Ranking	Team
1	Iowa Western
2	Hutchinson
3	Northwest Mississippi
4	Snow
5	Kilgore
6	Jones (MS)
7	Coffeyville
8	East Mississippi
9	Garden City
10	Iowa Central
11	Navarro
12	Butler (KS)
13	Georgia Military
14	Lackawanna
15	Trinity Valley

NJCAA Division III
Ranking	Team
1	DuPage
2	NDSCS
3	Minnesota State C&T
4t	Nassau
4t	Hocking
5	Rochester C&T

3C2A
Ranking	Team
1	San Mateo (8)
2	Riverside City
3	Mt. San Antonio
4	Fullerton
5	American River
6	Golden West
7	CC of San Francisco (1)
8	Ventura
9	Butte
10	Laney
11	Cerritos
12	Fresno City
13	Modesto
14	Sierra
15	College of the Canyons
16	El Camino
17t	Allan Hancock
17t	San Diego Mesa
19	Diablo Valley
20	Long Beach City
21	College of the Sequoias
22	Feather River
23	Citrus
24	East Los Angeles
25	Santa Rosa

=== 3C2A final regular season rankings ===
Rank	Team	W–L	Conference and standing	Bowl game
1	Fullerton Hornets	10–0	National Southern League champions	SCFA semifinal
2	Mt. San Antonio Mounties	10–0	National Central League champions	SCFA semifinal
3	San Mateo Bulldogs	9–1	National Bay 6 League champions	NCFC semifinal
4	American River Beavers	9–1	National Norcal League champions	NCFC semifinal
5	CC of San Francisco Rams	9–1	National Bay 6 League second place	NCFC semifinal
6	Riverside City Tigers	9–1	National Southern League second place	SCFA semifinal
7	Butte Roadrunners	8–2	National Norcal League second place	Northern California Bowl
8	Golden West Rustlers	8–2	National Central League second place	Beach Bowl
9	Modesto Pirates	7–3	National Valley League champion	NCFC semifinal
10	Allan Hancock Bulldogs	7–3	National Northern League champion (tie)	Strawberry Bowl
11	Ventura Pirates	7–3	National Northern League champion (tie)	SCFA semifinal
12	Citrus Owls	7–3	National Central League third place (tie)	Western State Bowl
13	College of the Canyons Cougars	6–4	National Northern League third place	Western State Bowl
14	Reedley Tigers	7–3	National Valley League third place	Northern California Bowl
15	Fresno City Rams	6–4	National Valley League second place	Gridiron Classic Bowl
16	Bakersfield Renegades	6–4	National Northern League fourth place (tie)	Patriotic Bowl
17	El Camino Warriors	6–4	National Northern League fourth place (tie)	Beach Bowl
18	San Diego Mesa Olympians	6–4	National Southern League third place (tie)	Strawberry Bowl
19	East Los Angeles Huskies	6–4	National Central League third place (tie)	Patriotic Bowl
20	Cerritos Falcons	5–5	National Central League fifth place (tie)	None
21	Sierra Wolverines	5–5	National Norcal League third place (tie)	Golden State Bowl
22	Foothill Owls	9–0	American Pacific 7 League champion	American Division Bowl
23	Chaffey Panthers	10–0	American Metro League champions	American Division Championship Bowl
24	College of the Sequoias Giants	5–5	National Valley League fourth place	Golden State Bowl
25	Saddleback Bobcats	5–5	National Southern League third place (tie)	None

=== Final rankings ===
NJCAA Division I
Ranking	Team
1	Iowa Western
2	East Mississippi
3	Hutchinson
4	Copiah–Lincoln
5	Kilgore
6	Dodge City
7	Iowa Central
8	Mississippi Gulf Coast
9	Snow
10	Trinity Valley
11	Georgia Military
12	Navarro
13	Northwest Mississippi
14	Lackawanna
15	Highland (KS)

NJCAA Division III
Ranking	Team
1	DuPage
2	Rochester C&T
3	NDSCS
4	Mesabi Range
5	Louisburg

3C2A
Ranking	Team
1	Riverside City (11)
2	San Mateo
3	American River
4	Mt. San Antonio
5	Fullerton
6	Ventura
7	CC of San Francisco
8	Butte
9	Golden West
10	Modesto
11	Citrus
12	El Camino
13	Allan Hancock
14	San Diego Mesa
15	East Los Angeles
16	Reedley
17	College of the Canyons
19	College of the Sequoias
20	Bakersfield
21	Cerritos
22	Foothill
23	Chaffey
24	Sierra
25	Saddleback

== Postseason ==
=== Playoffs ===
==== NJCAA Division I ====
Semifinals; December 2/3; Campus sites
1	Hutchinson	23
4	East Mississippi	27
3	Kilgore	7
2	Iowa Western	47

Championship game December 13; War Memorial Stadium—Little Rock, AR
4	East Mississippi	14
2	Iowa Western	61

==== 3C2A ====
===== SCFA playoffs =====
Semifinals; November 25; Campus sites
1	Mt. San Antonio	48
4	Riverside City	51
2	Fullerton	24
3	Ventura	27

Regional finals December 2 Campus sites
3	Ventura	26
4	Riverside City	45

===== NCFC playoffs =====
Semifinals; November 25; Campus sites
1	San Mateo	41
4	Modesto	19
2	American River	41
3	CC of San Francisco	6

Regional finals December 2 Campus sites
1	San Mateo	30
2	American River	27

===== State Championship =====
3C2A State Championship; December 9 Wheelock Stadium—Riverside, CA
1	San Mateo	21
4	Riverside City	24

=== Bowl games ===
The NJCAA Division I and 3C2A had fourteen bowl games combined, featuring teams that did not qualify for their respective leagues' postseason tournament.

Date	Time (EST)	Game	Site	Teams	Results
Nov 19	4:00 p.m.	Southern California Bowl	Campus sites	Santa Ana (8–2); Desert (6–4)	Santa Ana 56; Desert 48
Nov 20	12:30 p.m.	Beach Bowl	Campus sites	El Camino (6–4); Golden West (8–2)	El Camino 22; Golden West 19
Nov 21	5:00 p.m.	Strawberry Bowl	Campus sites	San Diego Mesa (6–4); Allan Hancock (7–3)	San Diego Mesa 42; Allan Hancock 20
Nov 25	2:00 p.m.	Gridiron Classic Bowl	Campus sites	Contra Costa (5–5); Fresno City (6–4)	Contra Costa 21 Fresno City 14
Nov 25	2:00 p.m.	Patriotic Bowl	Campus sites	East Los Angeles (6–4); Bakersfield (6–4)	East Los Angeles 31 Bakersfield 27
Nov 25	4:00 p.m.	Western State Bowl	Campus sites	Citrus (7–3); College of the Canyons (6–4)	Citrus 42 College of the Canyons 13
Nov 25	5:00 p.m.	American Division Championship Bowl	Campus sites	Chaffey (10–0); Pasadena City (9–1)	Chaffey 16 Pasadena City 12
Dec 1	5:00 p.m.	Golden State Bowl	Campus sites	College of the Sequoias (5–5); Sierra (5–5)	College of the Sequoias 31; Sierra 28
Dec 1	6:00 p.m.	Wool Bowl	Campus sites	Dodge City (7–3); New Mexico Military (6–5)	Dodge City 37; New Mexico Military 6
Dec 2	12:00 p.m.	Northern California Bowl	Campus sites	Butte (8–2); Reedley (7–3)	Butte 30; Reedley 24
Dec 2	12:00 p.m.	C.H.A.M.P.S. Heart of Texas Bowl	Memorial Stadium (Commerce, Texas)	Copiah–Lincoln (9–2); Navarro (6–4)	Copiah–Lincoln 28; Navarro 20
Dec 2	2:00 p.m.	American Division Bowl	Campus sites	Foothill (10–0); Monterey Peninsula (8–2)	Foothill 35; Monterey Peninsula 22
Dec 2	2:00 p.m.	Grizzly Bowl	Campus sites	College of the Redwoods (8–2); Hartnell (7–3)	College of the Redwoods 63; Hartnell 0
Dec 3	1:00 p.m.	Game One Bowl	UNI-Dome (Cedar Falls, Iowa)	Iowa Central (6–4); Snow (9–2)	Iowa Central 44; Snow 9

== Awards and honors ==
=== Individual honors ===
NJCAA Division I honors
Award	Name	Team
Coach of the Year	Scott Strohmeier	Iowa Western
Offensive Player of the Year	Ty Keyes, QB	East Mississippi
Defensive Player of the Year	Daniel Brown, DL	Hutchinson

NJCAA Division III honors
Award	Name	Team
Coach of the Year	Terrence Isaac	Rochester C&T
Offensive Player of the Year	Jaden McGill, RB	DuPage
Defensive Player of the Year	Martell Williams, LB	Rochester C&T

3C2A honors
Region	Award	Name	Team
Overall	Coach of the Year	Tom Craft	Riverside City
I	Coach of the Year	Tim Tulloch	San Mateo
II	Coach of the Year	Matt Ravio	Foothill
III	Coach of the Year	Tom Craft	Riverside City
IV	Coach of the Year	Darrin Chiaverini	Chaffey
Overall	Offensive Player of the Year	Jordan Barton, QB	Riverside City
I	Offensive Player of the Year	Anthony Grigsby, QB	San Mateo
II	Offensive Player of the Year	Hingano Hautau, OL	Foothill
III	Offensive Player of the Year	Jordan Barton, QB	Riverside City
IV	Offensive Player of the Year	Dereun Dortch, QB	Chaffey
Overall	Defensive Player of the Year	Josh Tremain, DL	American River
I	Defensive Player of the Year	Josh Tremain, DL	American River
II	Defensive Player of the Year	Samari Russo, DL	Merced
III	Defensive Player of the Year	Marquis Brown, DB; Brandon Tita-Nwu, LB	Golden West; Fullerton
IV	Defensive Player of the Year	Zamir Richardson, DL	Santa Ana

=== All-Americans ===
2023 All-NJCAA Division I Team

Offense

Position	Name	Height	Weight (lbs.)	Class	Hometown	Team
QB	Ty Keyes	6'2"	225	So.	Taylorsville, Mississippi	East Mississippi
RB	Terrez Worthy	5'11"	170	Fr.	Salisbury, Maryland	Lackawanna
RB	Johnnie Daniels	5'10"	200	So.	Crystal Springs, Mississippi	Copiah–Lincoln
WR	Deion Smith	6'4"	190	So.	Jackson, Mississippi	Holmes
WR	Mario Sanders II	5'10"	190	Fr.	Minneapolis, Minnesota	Iowa Central
TE	Greg Genross	6'6"	235	So.	New York City, New York	Dodge City
OL	Seth Wilfred	6'5"	329	Fr.	Las Vegas, Nevada	Snow
OL	Alex Fox	6'3"	300	So.	New Castle, Pennsylvania	Lackawanna
OL	Que McBroom	6'5"	325	So.	St. Louis, Missouri	NE Oklahoma A&M
OL	Issiah Walker	6'5"	300	So.	Miami, Florida	Butler (KS)
OL	Jonathan Young	6'5"	286	So.	Orland Park, Illinois	Iowa Central
PK	Gabriel Showalter	5'10"	175	So.	St. Martin, Mississippi	Mississippi Gulf Coast

Defense

Position	Name	Height	Weight (lbs.)	Class	Hometown	Team
LB	Travion Barnes	6'0"	224	So.	Altamonte Springs, Florida	Georgia Military
LB	Keaton Thomas	6'2"	224	Fr.	Jacksonville, Florida	Northeast Mississippi
LB	Bryan Cuthbertson	6'1"	245	Fr.	Sherwood, Oregon	Snow
DL	Daniel Brown	6'1"	250	So.	Kansas City, Kansas	Hutchinson
DL	Billy Pullen	6'3"	245	So.	Kaufman, Texas	Copiah–Lincoln
DL	Clev Lubin	6'3"	245	Fr.	Suffern, New York	Iowa Western
DL	Jaylen Pettus	6'3"	235	So.	Des Moines, Iowa	Iowa Western
DB	Ryan Nolan	5'10"	181	Fr.	Gainesville, Florida	Hutchinson
DB	Joshua Pierre-Louis	6'0"	173	So.	Palm Beach Gardens, Florida	Iowa Western
DB	Isaiah Crosby	5'10"	180	So.	Manor, Texas	Trinity Valley
DB	Anthony Pinnace	6'0"	170	Fr.	Ann Arbor, Michigan	Independence
RS	Tre Richardson	5'10"	175	Fr.	Topeka, Kansas	Hutchinson
P	James Allen	6'3"	190	So.	Australia	Trinity Valley

2023 All-NJCAA Division III Team

Offense

Position	Name	Height	Weight (lbs.)	Class	Hometown	Team
QB	Peyton O'Laughlin	6'0"	200	So.	Lake Geneva, Wisconsin	DuPage
RB	Jaden McGill	6'0"	205	So.	Chicago, Illinois	DuPage
RB	Roosevelt Cage	6'0"	215	So.	Burnsville, Minnesota	NDSCS
WR	Trevion Carothers	5'8"	160	Fr.	Racine, Wisconsin	NDSCS
WR	Rayshion Bien-Aise	6'2"	175	So.	Deerpark, New York	Nassau
WR	Terrence Isaac Jr.	6'1"	185	So.	DeSoto, Texas	Rochester C&T
OL	Gavin Layton	6'6"	290	So.	Andover, Minnesota	Rochester C&T
OL	Alejandro Arellano	6'3"	305	Fr.	Sterling, Illinois	DuPage
OL	Damaurius Stewart	6'3"	310	So.	South Holland, Illinois	DuPage
OL	Dawson Hageman	6'2"	275	So.	Grand Forks, North Dakota	NDSCS
OL	Ethan Bonacchi	6'6"	295	So.	Levittown, New York	Nassau
PK	Christian Casillas	6'0"	205	Fr.	Alsip, Illinois	DuPage

Defense

Position	Name	Height	Weight (lbs.)	Class	Hometown	Team
LB	Shamarr Joppy	6'1"	202	So.	Harrisburg, Pennsylvania	Hudson Valley
LB	Martell Williams	5'11"	235	So.	Hillside, Illinois	Rochester C&T
LB	Kellon King	6'1"	235	Fr.	Palatine, Illinois	DuPage
DL	Jason Gwan	6'2"	260	Fr.	Buffalo, New York	Erie
DL	Teyel Lowe	6'4"	260	So.	Worthington, Minnesota	Minnesota West C&T
DL	Seth Thomas	5'9"	270	So.	Mattawan, Michigan	Rochester C&T
DL	Bobby Anderson	6'4"	240	So.	Bolingbrook, Illinois	DuPage
DB	Brandon Perry	6'1"	192	Fr.	Charlotte, North Carolina	Louisburg
DB	Riley Dravet	5'11"	190	So.	Winfield, Illinois	DuPage
DB	Guy Goss	5'11"	173	So.	Hinsdale, Illinois	DuPage
DB	Alex Briggs			So.		Vermilion
RS	Quonterrion Brooks	6'0"	195	Fr.	Rock Island, Illinois	Minnesota West C&T
P	Thomas Dellaporta	6'3"	225	So.	East Setauket, New York	Nassau

2023 All-California Community College Team

Offense

Position	Name	Height	Weight (lbs.)	Class	Hometown	Team
QB	Jordan Barton	6'0"	185	So.	La Verne, California	Riverside City
RB	Christian Vaughn	5'10"	215	So.	Las Vegas, Nevada	Butte
RB	Nicholas Floyd	5'11"	200	So.	Riverside, California	Mt. San Antonio
WR	Robert Freeman IV	5'8"	185	So.	El Cerrito, California	American River
WR	Noah Cronquist	5'11"	195	So.	Moorpark, California	Moorpark
WR	Demari Davis	6'1"	175	So.	San Pablo, California	Contra Costa
TE	Ryan Boultwood	6'5"	235	Fr.	Upland, California	Mt. San Antonio
OL	Jakob Lemus	6'5"	300	So.	Oxnard, California	Ventura
OL	Ryan Cheeseman	6'3"	290	So.	Elk Grove, California	American River
OL	Daylon Metoyer	6'4"	315	So.	Hesperia, California	Mt. San Antonio
OL	Tyler McMahan	6'6"	295	So.	Sutter Creek, California	Modesto
OL	Leo Togia	6'4"	240	So.	Nuʻuuli, American Samoa	Allan Hancock
OL	Hingano Hautau	6'6"	325	So.	San Jose, California	Foothill
All-Purpose	Bryce Strong	5'10"	170	So.	Ontario, California	Riverside City
Utility	Anthony Grigsby Jr.	5'11"	190	Fr.	Stockton, California	San Mateo
PK	Caleb Ojeda	5'11"	180	So.	Morgan Hill, California	San Mateo

Defense

Position	Name	Height	Weight (lbs.)	Class	Hometown	Team
LB	Josh Tremain	6'1"	225	So.	Folsom, California	American River
LB	Brandon Tita-Nwa	6'0"	200	So.	Memphis, Tennessee	Fullerton
LB	Aiden Sullivan	6'2"	215	So.	Twentynine Palms, California	Butte
LB	Katin Surprenant	6'3"	240	So.	Upland, California	Mt. San Antonio
DL	Gabe Foster	6'1"	225	So.	Gardnerville, Nevada	Butte
DL	James Gillespie	6'3"	300	So.	Woodbridge, Virginia	Ventura
DL	Rhett Sarvela	6'3"	245	So.	Vancouver, Washington	College of the Sequoias
DL	Carl Nesmith	6'5"	240	So.	Jacksonville, Florida	Fullerton
DL	Zamir Richardson	6'3"	215	Fr.	Placentia, California	Santa Ana
DB	Marquis Brown	6'4"	200	So.	Huntington Beach, California	Golden West
DB	Ja'ir Smith	6'1"	190	So.	Charlotte, North Carolina	San Mateo
DB	Zedekiah Rodriguez-Brown	5'11"	185	So.	La Puente, California	Cerritos
DB	Kevin Washington Jr.	6'1"	205	So.	Miami, Florida	Fresno City
Utility	Jeremiah Henry	6'3"	280	So.	Oviedo, Florida	Laney
KR	Jonah Marcaida	5'10"	185	So.	Reno, Nevada	Butte
PR	Jordin Young	5'10"	170	Fr.		San Diego Mesa
P	Jeremy Ramirez	6'1"	220	Fr.	Rancho Cucamonga, California	Mt. San Antonio

== Coaching changes ==
This list includes all head coaching changes announced during or after the season.

School	Outgoing coach	Reason	Replacement	Previous position
CC of San Francisco	Jimmy Collins	Hired as head coach for Diablo Valley	Eduardo Yagües Nuño	CC of San Francisco offensive line coach (1998–2023)
Central Lakes	Greg Medeck	Hired as athletic director by Central Lakes	Toby Thurman	Armijo HS (CA) head coach (2019–2023)
Chaffey	Darrin Chiaverini	Hired as head coach by Northeastern State	Ben Buys	La Salle College Prep (CA) head coach (2019–2023)
Coffeyville	Jeff Leiker	Resigned	Nick Dobler	Coffeyville defensive coordinator and linebackers coach (2020–2023)
College of the Sequoias	Travis Burkett	Resigned	Matt Mendonca	College of the Sequoias defensive coordinator (2022–2023)
College of the Siskiyous	Tyler Knudsen	Resigned (Note: Remained on the staff as defensive coordinator.)	Adam Groppi (full-season interim)	Weed HS (CA) head coach (2022–2023)
Diablo Valley	Austin Kiraly (full-season interim)	Permanent coach hired	Jimmy Collins	CC of San Francisco head coach (2015–2023)
Dodge City	Terry Karg	Resigned	Ryan Lusby	Texas–Permian Basin assistant head coach and offensive coordinator (2023)
East Los Angeles	Bobby Godinez	Resigned	Arnie Robles (full-season interim)	East Los Angeles assistant coach (2023)
Ellsworth	Kory Vaught	Resigned	Matt White	UVA Wise defensive coordinator (2020–2023)
Fullerton	Garrett Campbell	Resigned	Phil Austin / Brian Crooks (co-head coaches)	Fullerton assistant coach (2017–2023) / Fullerton defensive coordinator (2010–2023)
Garden City	Tom Minnick	Fired	Kiyoshi Harris	Boise State recruiting coordinator (2022–2023)
Hartnell	Matt Collins	Resigned	Ruben Lerma (full-season interim)	Hartnell running backs coach and offensive line coach (2018–2023)
Minnesota State C&T	Austin Jones	Resigned	Bernard Holsey	Minnesota State C&T defensive coordinator and defensive line coach (2023)
Minnesota West C&T	Conner Kunkel (full-season interim)	Resigned	Jermaine Smith	Campbell defensive analyst (2023)
Nassau	Jamel Ramsay	Hired as head coach by Maritime	Jhaleel Oswald	Nassau defensive coordinator and special teams coordinator (2021–2023)
New Mexico Military	Kurt Taufa'asau	Hired as head coach by New Mexico Highlands	Oliver Soukup	Eastern New Mexico defensive coordinator (2023)
San Bernardino Valley	Daniel Algattas	N/A	Nate Turner (Note: Initially Iona Uiagalelei was hired but left before the season began.)	San Marino HS (CA) head coach (2023)
Santa Ana	Anthony White (Note: Co-head coach alongside Adam Nyssen.)	Died	Geoff Jones (Note: Co-head coach alongside Adam Nyssen.)	Santa Ana co-offensive coordinator and tight ends coach (2023)
Southwestern (CA)	Dionicio Monarrez Jr.	Resigned	Oscar Rodriguez	Kansas defensive analyst (2022–2023)
Vermilion	Earnest Wilson	Resigned	Tyree Johnson	Crookston HS (MN) defensive coordinator (?–2023)
West Los Angeles	Steve Ruedaflores	N/A	Eric Scott	San Jose State wide receivers coach (2021–2023)
Yuba	Mike Pomfret	Resigned	Tim Mulvehill	Placer HS (CA) assistant coach (?–2023)

== See also ==
- 2023 NCAA Division I FBS football season
- 2023 NCAA Division I FCS football season
- 2023 NCAA Division II football season
- 2023 NCAA Division III football season
- 2023 NAIA football season
- 2023 U Sports football season
