= Jeff Leiker =

American football player and coach

Current position
- Title: Athletic director
- Team: Coffeyville
- Conference: KJCCC

Biographical details
- Born: March 22, 1962 (age 64); Coffeyville, Kansas, U.S.

Playing career
- 1981–1982: Independence
- 1983–1984: Washburn
- Position: Quarterback

Coaching career (HC unless noted)
- 1985–1987: Independence HS (KS) (assistant)
- 1988: New Mexico State (OLB)
- 1989–1991: Butler County (RB/WR)
- 1992–1995: Garden City
- 1996: Tennessee (GA)
- 1997: Missouri Western (assistant)
- 1998–2000: Fort Hays State
- 2001–2007: Coffeyville
- 2020–2023: Coffeyville

Administrative career (AD unless noted)
- 2007–present: Coffeyville

Head coaching record
- Overall: 13–19 (college); 109–51 (junior college)
- Bowls: 4–5 (junior college)
- Tournaments: 0–1 (NJCAA playoffs); 16–9 (KJCCC / NJCAA Region VI playoffs)

Accomplishments and honors

Championships
- 4 KJCCC regular season (1994–1995, 2006, 2021); 3 KJCCC / NJCAA Region VI playoffs (1992 1994, 2005)

Jeff Leiker (born March 22, 1962) is an American community college sports administrator and former football player and coach. He is the athletic director at Coffeyville Community College in Coffeyville, Kansas, a position he has held since November 2007. Leiker has served two stints as the head football coach at Coffeyville, from 2001 to 2007 and 2020 to 2023. He was also the head football coach at Garden City Community College in Garden City, Kansas from 1992 to 1995 and at Fort Hays State University in Hays, Kansas 1998 to 2000.

In 1980, Leiker graduated from Independence High School in Independence, Kansas. He then played college football as a quarterback at Independence Community College and Washburn University. He began his coaching career in 1985 as an assistant as his alma mater, Independence High.

== Head coaching record ==
=== College ===
Year	Team	Overall	Conference	Standing	Bowl/playoffs
Fort Hays State Tigers (Rocky Mountain Athletic Conference) (1998–2000)
1998	Fort Hays State	6–5	4–4	5th	
1999	Fort Hays State	2–9	2–6	T–7th	
2000	Fort Hays State	5–5	3–5	5th	
Fort Hays State:		13–19	9–15		
Total:		13–19			

=== Junior college ===
Year	Team	Overall	Conference	Standing	Bowl/playoffs
Garden City Broncbusters (Kansas Jayhawk Community College Conference) (1992–1995)
1992	Garden City	9–3	4–2	T–2nd	W KJCCC championship, W Mineral Water Bowl
1993	Garden City	5–5	3–3	4th	L KJCCC championship
1994	Garden City	10–1	6–0	1st	W KJCCC championship, L Dixie Rotary Bowl
1995	Garden City	9–2	5–1	T–1st	L KJCCC championship, W Valley of the Sun Bowl
Garden City:		33–11	18–6		
Coffeyville Red Ravens (Kansas Jayhawk Community College Conference) (2001–2007)
2001	Coffeyville	7–4	5–2	T–3rd	L KJCCC semifinal
2002	Coffeyville	9–3	6–1	2nd	L KJCCC championship, W Dalton Defenders Bowl
2003	Coffeyville	9–3	6–1	2nd	L KJCCC championship, L Dalton Defenders Bowl
2004	Coffeyville	10–2	6–1	2nd	L NJCAA Region VI championship, W Valley of the Sun Bowl
2005	Coffeyville	9–3	5–3	3rd	W NJCAA Region VI championship, L Sea Island Bowl
2006	Coffeyville	7–4	6–1	T–1st	L NJCAA Region VI semifinal, L Top of the Mountain Bowl
2007	Coffeyville	5–5	4–3	4th	L NJCAA Region VI semifinal
Coffeyville Red Ravens (Kansas Jayhawk Community College Conference) (2020–2023)
2020–21	Coffeyville	3–3	3–3	4th	
2021	Coffeyville	6–3	6–1	T–1st	L KJCCC First Round, L C.H.A.M.P.S. Heart of Texas Bowl
2022	Coffeyville	8–3	4–2	T–2nd	L NJCAA Semifinal
2023	Coffeyville	3–7	1–5	T–6th	
Coffeyville:		76–40	52–23		
Total:		109–51			
National championship Conference title Conference division title or championship game berth
