= Tom Minnick =

American football coach (born 1968)

Biographical details
- Born: c. 1968 (age 57–58); Fort Wayne, Indiana, U.S.
- Education: University of Missouri–Rolla (1991)

Playing career
- 1986–1987: DuPage
- Position: Quarterback

Coaching career (HC unless noted)
- 1990–1996: DuPage (assistant)
- 1997: Lake Park HS (IL) (assistant)
- 1998–2005: Joliet (RB/DL)
- 2006–2007: Joliet
- 2008–2018: Arizona Western
- 2019–2023: Garden City
- 2025: Highland (KS)

Head coaching record
- Overall: 132–51 (Note: Arizona Western began the 2013 season 7–2 but had to forfeit five wins due to ineligible players and their record was changed to 2–7 mid-season.)
- Bowls: 5–8
- Tournaments: 2–1 (MWFC playoffs); 2–1 (WSFL playoffs)

Accomplishments and honors

Championships
- 6 WSFL (2009–2011, 2014, 2016–2017); 1 MWFC (2007); 2 MWFC East Division (2006–2007)

Thomas Minnick (born c. 1968) is an American junior college football coach. He was the head football coach for Joliet Junior College from 2006 to 2007, Arizona Western College from 2008 to 2018, and Garden City Community College from 2019 to 2023, and Highland Community College in 2025. He also coached for DuPage and Lake Park High School. He played college football for DuPage as a quarterback.

== Head coaching record ==
Year	Team	Overall	Conference	Standing	Bowl/playoffs
Joliet Wolves (Midwest Football Conference) (2006–2007)
2006	Joliet	7–4	6–2	1st (East)	L MWFC semifinal, L Graphic Edge Bowl
2007	Joliet	10–2	6–2	1st (East)	W MWFC championship, W Graphic Edge Bowl
Joliet:		17–6	12–4		
Arizona Western Matadors (Western States Football League) (2008–2018)
2008	Arizona Western	5–5	4–4	5th	
2009	Arizona Western	9–2	7–1	T–1st	L Mississippi Bowl
2010	Arizona Western	10–2	7–1	T–1st	L C.H.A.M.P.S. Heart of Texas Bowl
2011	Arizona Western	11–1	8–0	1st	L El Toro Bowl
2012	Arizona Western	8–2	6–2	T–2nd	W El Toro Bowl
2013	Arizona Western	2–10	2–8		L El Toro Bowl
2014	Arizona Western	11–0	8–1	T–1st	W WSFL championship, W El Toro Bowl
2015	Arizona Western	7–4	5–3	T–2nd	L WSFL semifinal, W El Toro Bowl
2016	Arizona Western	11–1	8–0	1st	L El Toro Bowl
2017	Arizona Western	9–1	7–0	1st	L Mississippi Bowl
2018	Arizona Western	6–5	4–3	T–4th	L El Toro Bowl
Arizona Western:		87–23	64–15		
Garden City Broncbusters (Kansas Jayhawk Community College Conference) (2019–2023)
2019	Garden City	8–3	5–2	T–2nd	
2020–21	Garden City	7–1	6–1	2nd	
2021	Garden City	8–3	5–1	3rd	W Scooter's Coffee Bowl
2022	Garden City	4–6	3–3	T–4th	
2023	Garden City	5–6	3–3	T–3rd	
Garden City:		28–13	19–7		
Highland Scotties (Kansas Jayhawk Community College Conference) (2025)
2025	Highland	0–9 (Note: Highland (KS) fired Minnick after nine games.)	0–5		
Highland:		0–9	0–5		
Total:		132–51			
National championship Conference title Conference division title or championship game berth
