= Scott Strohmeier =

American football coach (born c. 1976)

Current position
- Title: Iowa Western
- Team: Head coach
- Conference: ICCAC
- Record: 165–31

Biographical details
- Born: c. 1976 (age 49–50)
- Education: Concordia University, St. Paul

Playing career
- 1994–1995: Fergus Falls
- 1996–1997: Minnesota Crookston
- Position: Quarterback

Coaching career (HC unless noted)
- 1998: Concordia–St. Paul (RB)
- 1999: Concordia–St. Paul (TE)
- 2000–2001: Concordia–St. Paul (QB)
- 2002–2003: Concordia–St. Paul (OC/QB)
- 2004: Truman (AHC/OC)
- 2005–2007: North Iowa Area
- 2008–present: Iowa Western

Head coaching record
- Overall: 181–45
- Bowls: 7–4
- Tournaments: 8–2 (NJCAA Division I playoffs)

Accomplishments and honors

Championships
- 4 NJCAA (2012, 2022–2023, 2025); 11 ICCAC (2014–2018, 2020–2025); 2 MFC (2012–2013); 2 MFC West Division (2010–2011)

Awards
- NJCAA Hall of Fame (2021); Minnesota Crookston Hall of Fame (2014); 2× ACCFCA Coach of the Year (2012, 2017)

Scott Strohmeier (born c. 1976) is an American college football coach. He is the head football coach for Iowa Western Community College, a position he has held since the program's inception in 2008. He was the head football coach for North Iowa Area Community College from 2005 to 2007. He also coached for Concordia–St. Paul and Truman. He played college football for Fergus Falls and Minnesota Crookston as a quarterback.

In 17 seasons as head coach for the Iowa Western Reiver, Strohmeier has led the team to a 165–31 record, 13 conference championships, and four NJCAA National Football Championships. In 2012, he led the Reivers to an undefeated 12–0 record and the program's first NJCAA National Championship.

In three seasons as head coach for North Iowa Area, Strohmeier led the team to a 16–14 record, including back-to-back Graphic Edge Bowl appearances in 2006 and 2007.

Strohmeier was inducted into the NJCAA Hall of Fame in 2021 and into the Minnesota Crookston Hall of Fame in 2014.

== Head coaching record ==
Year	Team	Overall	Conference	Standing	Bowl/playoffs	D1^{#}
North Iowa Area Trojans (Midwest Football Conference) (2005–2007)
2005	North Iowa Area	2–6	2–6	T–7th		
2006	North Iowa Area	7–4	5–3	2nd (West)	L Graphic Edge Bowl	20
2007	North Iowa Area	7–4	5–3	2nd (West)	L Graphic Edge Bowl	14
North Iowa Area:		16–14	12–12			
Iowa Western Reivers (Midwest Football Conference) (2009–2013)
2009	Iowa Western	5–4	4–4	T–3rd (West)		
2010	Iowa Western	9–2	7–0	1st (West)	L Zions Top of the Mountain Bowl	11
2011	Iowa Western	9–2	6–1	1st (West)	W Graphic Edge Bowl	7
2012	Iowa Western	12–0	4–0	1st	W Graphic Edge Bowl	1
2013	Iowa Western	11–1	8–0	1st	W Graphic Edge Bowl	2
Iowa Western Reivers (Iowa Community College Athletic Conference) (2014–present)
2014	Iowa Western	11–1	1–0	T–1st	L Mississippi Bowl	3
2015	Iowa Western	10–2	2–0	1st	W Graphic Edge Bowl	3
2016	Iowa Western	6–6	2–0	1st	L Graphic Edge Bowl	
2017	Iowa Western	11–1	2–0	1st	W Graphic Edge Bowl	2
2018	Iowa Western	10–1	2–0	1st	W Graphic Edge Bowl	3
2019	Iowa Western	9–3	1–1	2nd	W Graphic Edge Bowl	4
2020–21	Iowa Western	7–1	4–0	1st		4
2021	Iowa Western	10–1	4–0	1st	L NJCAA Division I National Championship	2
2022	Iowa Western	10–2	2–0	1st	W NJCAA Division I National Championship	1
2023	Iowa Western	12–1	2–0	1st	W NJCAA Division I National Championship	1
2024	Iowa Western	11–2	2–0	1st	L NJCAA Division I National Championship	2
2025	Iowa Western	12–1	2–0	1st	W NJCAA Division I National Championship	1
Iowa Western:		165–31	53–6			
Total:		181–45				
National championship Conference title Conference division title or championship game berth
