= 2023 junior college football rankings =

Rankings for the 2023 junior college football season

- Season: 2023
- Postseason: Single-elimination

The 2023 junior college football rankings are conducted on a week-to-week basis and based on the NJCAA Division I, NJCAA Division III, and the 3C2A. The 3C2A poll is released by the Junior College Athletic Bureau's Fred Baer.

== Legend ==
	Increase in ranking
	Decrease in ranking
	Not ranked previous week or no change
	Selected for playoffs
(#–#)	Win–loss record
(Italics)	Number of first place votes
т	Tied with team above or below also with this symbol

== NJCAA Division I poll ==
	Preseason August 21	Week 1 August 28	Week 2 September 5	Week 3 September 11	Week 4 September 18	Week 5 September 25	Week 6 October 2	Week 7 October 9	Week 8 October 16	Week 9 October 23	Week 10 October 30	Week 11 November 6	Week 12 November 13	Week 13 November 20	Week 14 (Final) December 18	
1.	Iowa Western	Hutchinson (1–0)	Hutchinson (2–0)	Hutchinson (3–0)	Hutchinson (3–0)	Hutchinson (4–0)	Hutchinson (5–0)	Hutchinson (6–0)	Hutchinson (6–0)	Hutchinson (7–0)	Hutchinson (8–0)	Hutchinson (9–0)	Hutchinson (10–0)	Hutchinson (10–0)	Iowa Western (12–1)	1.
2.	Hutchinson	Iowa Western (1–0)	Iowa Western (2–0)	Iowa Western (3–0)	Iowa Western (4–0)	Iowa Western (5–0)	Iowa Western (6–0)	Iowa Western (7–0)	Iowa Western (7–0)	Iowa Western (8–0)	Iowa Western (9–0)	Iowa Western (10–0)	Iowa Western (10–1)	Iowa Western (10–1)	East Mississippi (10–3)	2.
3.	Northwest Mississippi	Northwest Mississippi (0–0)	Northwest Mississippi (0–0)	Kilgore (2–0)	Kilgore (3–0)	Iowa Central (4–1)	Iowa Central (4–1)	Iowa Central (5–1)	Kilgore (4–1)	Kilgore (5–1)	Kilgore (6–1)	Kilgore (7–1)	Kilgore (8–1)	Kilgore (9–1)	Hutchinson (10–1)	3.
4.	Snow	Kilgore (1–0)	Kilgore (1–0)	Jones (MS) (1–0)	Iowa Central (3–1)	Mississippi Gulf Coast (3–0)	Mississippi Gulf Coast (4–0)	Mississippi Gulf Coast (5–0)	Trinity Valley (5–1)	Jones (MS) (6–1)	Snow (7–2)	Copiah–Lincoln (8–1)	Copiah–Lincoln (9–1)	East Mississippi (9–2)	Copiah–Lincoln (10–2)	4.
5.	Kilgore	Garden City (1–0)	Iowa Central (2–0)	Trinity Valley (2–0)	Mississippi Gulf Coast (2–0)	Snow (3–1)	Snow (4–1)	Kilgore (4–1)	Jones (MS) (5–1)	Snow (6–2)	Copiah–Lincoln (7–1)	Snow (8–2)	Snow (9–2)	Snow (9–2)	Kilgore (9–2)	5.
6.	Jones (MS)	Jones (MS) (0–0)	Jones (MS) (0–0)	Iowa Central (2–1)	Snow (2–1)	East Mississippi (2–1)	Tyler (3–1)	Trinity Valley (4–1)	Snow (5–2)	Mississippi Gulf Coast (6–1)	Mississippi Gulf Coast (7–2)	Mississippi Gulf Coast (8–1)	East Mississippi (8–2)	Copiah–Lincoln (9–2)	Dodge City (8–3)	6.
7.	Coffeyville	Trinity Valley (1–0)	Trinity Valley (1–0)	Snow (2–1)	East Mississippi (1–1)	Tyler (2–1)	Kilgore (4–1)	Jones (MS) (4–1)	Butler (KS) (4–2)	Copiah–Lincoln (6–1)	Trinity Valley (6–2)	Trinity Valley (7–2)	Dodge City (7–3)	Dodge City (7–3)	Iowa Central (7–4)	7.
8.	East Mississippi	East Mississippi (0–0)	East Mississippi (0–0)	Mississippi Gulf Coast (1–0)	Tyler (2–1)	Kilgore (3–1)	Trinity Valley (3–1)	Snow (4–2)	Mississippi Gulf Coast (5–1)	Trinity Valley (5–2)	East Mississippi (6–2)	East Mississippi (7–2)	Navarro (6–3)	Mississippi Gulf Coast (8–2)	Mississippi Gulf Coast (8–2)	8.
9.	Garden City	Iowa Central (1–0)	Snow (1–1)	Lackawanna (2–0)	Trinity Valley (2–1)	Trinity Valley (3–1)	Jones (MS) (3–1)	Northeast Mississippi (5–0)	Iowa Central (5–2)	East Mississippi (5–2)	Dodge City (5–3)	Dodge City (6–3)	Mississippi Gulf Coast (8–2)	Trinity Valley (7–3)	Snow (9–3)	9.
10.	Iowa Central	Snow (0–1)	Garden City (1–1)	New Mexico Military (2–1)	Lincoln–Copiah (2–0)	Butler (KS) (3–1)	Northwest Mississippi (3–1)	East Mississippi (3–2)	Copiah–Lincoln (5–1)	Dodge City (5–3)	Jones (MS) (6–2)	Northwest Mississippi (7–2)	Trinity Valley (7–3)	Navarro (6–4)	Trinity Valley (7–3)	10.
11.	Navarro	Georgia Military (0–0)	Lackawanna (1–0)	Northwest Mississippi (0–1)	Butler (KS) (2–1)	Jones (MS) (2–1)	Dodge City (3–2)	Lackawanna (5–1)	East Mississippi (4–2)	Tyler (5–2)	Georgia Military (6–3)	Lackawanna (7–2)	Iowa Central (6–4)	Iowa Central (6–4)	Georgia Military (7–4)	11.
12.	Butler (KS)	Lackawanna (0–0)	Butler (KS) (1–1)	Butler (KS) (1–1)	Jones (MS) (1–1)	Northwest Mississippi (2–1)	Northeast Mississippi (4–0)	Butler (KS) (3–2)	Tyler (4–2)	Lackawanna (6–1)	Tyler (5–3)	Navarro (5–3)	Georgia Military (7–4)	Georgia Military (7–4)	Navarro (6–5)	12.
13.	Georgia Military	Butler (KS) (0–1)	Georgia Military (1–1)	East Mississippi (0–1)	Northwest Mississippi (1–1)	Georgia Military (3–2)	East Mississippi (2–2)	Tyler (3–2)	Lackawanna (6–1)	Butler (KS) (4–3)	Northeast Mississippi (6–2)	Iowa Central (6–4)	Northwest Mississippi (7–3)	Northwest Mississippi (7–3)	Northwest Mississippi (7–3)	13.
14.	Lackawanna	New Mexico Military (1–0)	New Mexico Military (1–1)	Garden City (1–2)	Garden City (2–2)	Northeast Mississippi (3–0)	Butler (KS) (3–2)	New Mexico Military (4–2)	Dodge City (4–3)	Iowa Central (5–3)	Lackawanna (6–2)	New Mexico Miliatry (5–4)	Lackawanna (7–3)	Lackawanna (7–3)	Lackawanna (7–3)	14.
15.	Trinity Valley	Navarro (0–1)	Navarro (0–1)	Tyler (1–1)	Georgia Military (2–2)	Dodge City (2–2)	Lackawanna (4–1)	Northwest Mississippi (3–2)	Northeast Mississippi (5–1)	Georgia Military (5–3)	Northwest Mississippi (6–2)	Jones (MS) (6–3)	New Mexico Military (6–4)	New Mexico Military (6–5)	Highland (KS) (6–5)	15.
	Preseason August 21	Week 1 August 28	Week 2 September 5	Week 3 September 11	Week 4 September 18	Week 5 September 25	Week 6 October 2	Week 7 October 9	Week 8 October 16	Week 9 October 23	Week 10 October 30	Week 11 November 6	Week 12 November 13	Week 13 November 20	Week 14 (Final) December 18	
		Dropped: Coffeyville (0–1)	None	Dropped: Georgia Military (1–2); Navarro (0–2)	Dropped: New Mexico Military (2–2); Lackawanna (2–1)	Dropped: Garden City (2–3); Lincoln–Copiah (2–1)	Dropped: Georgia Military (3–3)	Dropped: Dodge City (3–3)	Dropped: New Mexico Military (4–3); Northwest Mississippi (4–2)	Dropped: Northeast Mississippi (5–2)	Dropped: Iowa Central (5–4); Butler (KS) (4–4)	Dropped: Northeast Mississippi (6–3); Tyler (5–4); Georgia Military (6–4)	Dropped: Jones (MS) (6–4)	None	Dropped: New Mexico Military (6–6)	

== NJCAA Division III poll ==
	Preseason August 21	Week 1 August 28	Week 2 September 5	Week 3 September 11	Week 4 September 18	Week 5 September 25	Week 6 October 2	Week 7 October 9	Week 8 October 16	Week 9 October 23	Week 10 (Final) October 30	
1.	DuPage	DuPage (1–0)	DuPage (2–0)	DuPage (3–0)	DuPage (4–0)	DuPage (4–1)	DuPage (5–1)	DuPage (6–1)	DuPage (7–1)	DuPage (8–1)	DuPage (9–1)	1.
2.	NDSCS	NDSCS (0–0)	NDSCS (2–0)	NDSCS (3–0)	NDSCS (3–1)	NDSCS (4–1)	NDSCS (5–1)	Rochester C&T (5–2)	Rochester C&T (6–2)	Rochester C&T (6–2)	Rochester C&T (7–2)	2.
3.	Minnesota State C&T	Minnesota State C&T (0–0)	Minnesota State C&T (1–0)	Rochester C&T (2–1)	Rochester C&T (3–1)	Rochester C&T (4–1)	Minnesota State C&T (3–2)	NDSCS (5–2)	NDSCS (6–2)	NDSCS (7–2)	NDSCS (8–2)	3.
4.	Nassau т Hocking т	Rochester C&T (1–0)	Rochester C&T (1–1)	Minnesota State C&T (1–1)	Minnesota State C&T (2–1)	Mesabi Range (3–1)	Rochester C&T (4–2)	Mesabi Range (4–2)	Mesabi Range (4–3)	Mesabi Range (5–3)	Mesabi Range (5–4)	4.
5.	Rochester C&T	Nassau (0–0)	Nassau (0–1)	Hudson Valley т (2–0); Mesabi Range т (2–0)	Mesabi Range (2–1)	Louisburg (2–1)	Louisburg (3–1)	Minnesota State C&T (3–3)	Minnesota State C&T (4–3)	Louisburg (4–3)	Louisburg (5–3)	5.
	Preseason August 21	Week 1 August 28	Week 2 September 5	Week 3 September 11	Week 4 September 18	Week 5 September 25	Week 6 October 2	Week 7 October 9	Week 8 October 16	Week 9 October 23	Week 10 (Final) October 30	
		Dropped: Minnesota State C&T (0–0)	None	Dropped: Nassau (0–2)	Dropped: Hudson Valley (2–1)	Dropped: Minnesota State C&T (2–2)	None	Dropped: Louisburg (3–2)	None	Dropped: Minnesota State C&T (4–4)	None	

== 3C2A poll ==
	Preseason September 1	Week 1 September 6	Week 2 September 12	Week 3 September 19	Week 4	Week 5	Week 6	Week 7	Week 8	Week 9	Week 10	Week 11 (Final)	
1.	San Mateo (8)	San Mateo (1–0) (6)	San Mateo (2–0) (8)	San Mateo (3–0) (10)									1.
2.	Riverside City	Riverside City (1–0)	Riverside City (2–0) (1)	Riverside City (3–0) (1)									2.
3.	Mt. San Antonio	CC of San Francisco (1–0) (4)	CC of San Francisco (2–0) (2)	Mt. San Antonio (3–0)									3.
4.	Fullerton	Mt. San Antonio (1–0)	Mt. San Antonio (2–0)	CC of San Francisco (3–0)									4.
5.	American River	Fullerton (1–0)	Fullerton (2–0)	American River (3–0)									5.
6.	Golden West	Golden West (1–0)	Butte (2–0)	Fullerton (3–0)									6.
7.	CC of San Francisco (1)	Butte (1–0)	American River (2–0)	Citrus (3–0)									7.
8.	Ventura	American River (1–0)	San Diego Mesa (2–0)	Golden West (2–1)									8.
9.	Butte	Ventura (1–0)	El Camino (2–0)	Butte (2–1)									9.
10.	Laney	Cerritos (1–0)	Modesto (2–0)	Cerritos (2–1)									10.
11.	Cerritos	Fresno City (1–0)	Citrus (2–0)	Modesto (2–1)									11.
12.	Fresno City	Modesto (1–0)	East Los Angeles (2–0)	Sierra (2–1)									12.
13.	Modesto	El Camino (1–0)	Golden West (1–1)	Contra Costa (3–0)									13.
14.	Sierra	San Diego Mesa (1–0)	Sierra (1–1)	San Diego Mesa (2–1)									14.
15.	College of the Canyons	Citrus (1–0)	Cerritos (1–1)	El Camino (2–1)									15.
16.	El Camino	Allan Hancock (1–0)	Reedley (2–0)	Reedley (2–1)									16.
17.	Allan Hancock т	East Los Angeles (1–0)	Ventura (1–1)	Bakersfield (2–1)									17.
18.	San Diego Mesa т	Sierra (0–1)	Allan Hancock (1–1)	East Los Angeles (2–1)									18.
19.	Diablo Valley	Palomar (1–0)	Contra Costa (2–0)	Santa Barbara City (2–1)									19.
20.	Long Beach City	Laney (0–1)	Fresno City (1–1)	Ventura (1–2)									20.
21.	College of the Sequoias	Long Beach City (0–1)	Palomar (1–1)	Moorpark (2–1)									21.
22.	Feather River	College of the Sequoias (0–1)	Bakersfield (1–1)	Long Beach City (1–2)									22.
23.	Citrus	Feather River (1–0)	Long Beach City (0–2)	Fresno City (1–2)									23.
24.	East Los Angeles	Reedley (1–0)	Santa Barbara City (1–1)	Allan Hancock (1–2)									24.
25.	Santa Rosa	College of the Canyons (0–1)	College of the Sequoias (0–2)	College of the Sequoias (1–2)									25.
	Preseason September 1	Week 1 September 6	Week 2 September 12	Week 3 September 19	Week 4	Week 5	Week 6	Week 7	Week 8	Week 9	Week 10	Week 11 (Final)	
		Dropped: Diablo Valley (0–1); Santa Rosa (0–1)	Dropped: College of the Canyons (0–2); Feather River (1–1); Laney (0–2)	Dropped: Palomar (1–2)	None	None	None	None	None	None	None	None	
