= 2023 Iowa Western Reivers football team =

American college football season

2023 Iowa Western Reivers football

NJCAA Division I champion ICCAC champion

NJCAA championship game, W 61–14 vs. East Mississippi
- Conference: Iowa Community College Athletic Conference
- Record: 12–1 (2–0 ICCAC)
- Head coach: Scott Strohmeier (15th season)
- Offensive coordinator: Tristan Speer (2nd season)
- Defensive coordinator: Mike Blackbourn (15th season)
- Home stadium: Titan Stadium

2023 Iowa Community College Athletic Conference football standings
	Conf.			Overall
Team	W		L	W		L
No. 1 Iowa Western $^	2	–	0	12	–	1
No. 7 Iowa Central	1	–	1	7	–	4
Ellsworth	0	–	2	2	–	9
$ – Conference champion; ^ – NJCAA Division I playoff participant; Rankings from NJCAA Division I poll

The 2023 Iowa Western Reivers football team was an American football team that represented Iowa Western Community College as a member of the Iowa Community College Athletic Conference (ICCAC) during the 2023 junior college football season. Led by 14th-year head coach Scott Strohmeier, the Reivers compiled a 12–1 record, defeated East Mississippi in the National Junior College Athletic Association (NJCAA) championship game, and won the NJCAA National Football Championship. It was Iowa Western's second consecutive national championship.

The team's statistical leaders included Hunter Watson with 1,904 passing yards, Jonathan Humpal with 808 rushing yards, LJ Fitzpatrick with 345 receiving yards, and Max Bartachek with 70 points scored (46 extra points, eight field goals).

== Schedule ==
Date	Opponent	Site	Result	Attendance	Source
August 26	at Dodge City*	Memorial Stadium; Dodge City, KS	W 27–20		
September 2	Georgia Military*	Titan Stadium; Council Bluffs, IA	W 26–10		
September 9	at Garden City*	Broncbuster Stadium; Garden City, KS	W 44–27	1,200	
September 16	Highland (KS)*	Titan Stadium; Council Bluffs, IA	W 21–16		
September 23	at Ellsworth	Cadet Field; Iowa Falls, IA	W 42–7		
September 30	Independence*	Titan Stadium; Council Bluffs, IA	W 28–13	5,250	
October 7	at Snow*	Terry Foote Stadium; Ephraim, UT	W 20–13	2,441	
October 21	at Butler (KS)*	El Dorado, KS	W 28–21		
October 28	Iowa Central	Titan Stadium; Council Bluffs, IA	W 34–14	3,000	
November 4	Coffeyville*	Titan Stadium; Council Bluffs, IA	W 20–17	2,800	
November 11	Hutchinson*	Gowans Stadium; Hutchinson, KS	L 28–42	2,800	
December 3	Kilgore*	Titan Stadium; Council Bluffs, IA (NJCAA Division I semifinal)	W 47–7	1,800	
December 13	vs. East Mississippi*	War Memorial Stadium; Litte Rock, AR (NJCAA Division I championship game)	W 61–14	2,148	
*Non-conference game
