= 2007 junior college football season =

American junior college football season

- National Championship: Chukchansi Park, Fresno, CA, (CCCAA)
- Champion(s): Butler (KS) & Mississippi Gulf Coast (NJCAA); CC of San Francisco (CCCAA)

The 2007 junior college football season was the season of intercollegiate junior college football running from September to December 2007. The season ended with three national champions: two from the National Junior College Athletic Association and one from the California Community College Athletic Association (CCCAA).

The NJCAA champions were Butler (KS) and Mississippi Gulf Coast, who both ended the season undefeated. It was the first time there were co-national champions since 1960. The CCCAA champion was CC of San Francisco who defeated Mt. San Antonio 31–28 in the CCCAA State Championship.

== Conference standings ==
=== NJCAA ===
2007 Kansas Jayhawk Community College Conference football standings
| | Conf. | | | Overall |
| Team | W | | L | W | | L |
|---|---|---|---|---|---|---|
| Butler (KS) †y$ | 7 | – | 0 | 12 | – | 0 |
| Fort Scott †y | 6 | – | 1 | 9 | – | 3 |
| Garden City † | 5 | – | 2 | 7 | – | 3 |
| Coffeyville † | 4 | – | 3 | 5 | – | 5 |
| Hutchinson | 2 | – | 5 | 2 | – | 7 |
| Independence | 2 | – | 5 | 2 | – | 7 |
| Dodge City | 1 | – | 6 | 1 | – | 8 |
| Highland (KS) | 1 | – | 6 | 1 | – | 8 |
Championship: Butler (KS) 35, Fort Scott 22
$ – Conference champion; † – Conference playoff participant; y – Championship game participant

2007 Midwest Football Conference standings
| | Conf. | | | Overall |
| Team | W | | L | W | | L |
|---|---|---|---|---|---|---|
East Division
| Joliet #xy$ | 6 | – | 2 | 10 | – | 2 |
| DuPage | 5 | – | 3 | 6 | – | 4 |
| Harper # | 4 | – | 4 | 6 | – | 6 |
| Grand Rapids | 4 | – | 4 | 4 | – | 5 |
| Rock Valley | 1 | – | 7 | 2 | – | 7 |
West Division
| Iowa Central #x | 7 | – | 1 | 9 | – | 2 |
| North Iowa Area #y | 5 | – | 3 | 7 | – | 4 |
| Ellsworth | 3 | – | 5 | 4 | – | 5 |
| NDSCS | 1 | – | 7 | 2 | – | 7 |
Championship: Joliet 28, North Iowa Area 21
$ – Conference champion; x – Division champion/co-champions; y – Championship game participant; # – MFC playoff participant

2007 Minnesota College Athletic Conference football standings
| | Conf. | | | Overall |
| Team | W | | L | W | | L |
|---|---|---|---|---|---|---|
North Division
| Vermilion x† | 4 | – | 0 | 7 | – | 3 |
| Rainy River † | 3 | – | 1 | 6 | – | 4 |
| Northland | 2 | – | 2 | 6 | – | 3 |
| Itasca | 1 | – | 3 | 3 | – | 6 |
| Mesabi Range | 0 | – | 4 | 2 | – | 7 |
South Division
| Rochester C&T x†y$ | 5 | – | 0 | 11 | – | 0 |
| Central Lakes †y | 4 | – | 1 | 7 | – | 4 |
| Ridgewater | 2 | – | 3 | 5 | – | 4 |
| Minnesota State C&T | 2 | – | 3 | 3 | – | 6 |
| Minnesota West C&T | 2 | – | 3 | 2 | – | 7 |
| Fond du Lac | 0 | – | 5 | 0 | – | 9 |
Championship: Rochester C&T 38, Central Lakes 18
$ – Conference champion; † – Conference playoff participant; y – Championship game participant

2007 Northeast Football Conference standings
| | Conf. | | | Overall |
| Team | W | | L | W | | L |
|---|---|---|---|---|---|---|
| Dean $ | 4 | – | 1 | 9 | – | 1 |
| Lackawanna | 3 | – | 2 | 7 | – | 3 |
| Nassau | 3 | – | 2 | 7 | – | 3 |
| Erie | 3 | – | 2 | 7 | – | 3 |
| Hudson Valley | 2 | – | 3 | 5 | – | 5 |
| Alfred State | 0 | – | 5 | 3 | – | 7 |
$ – Conference champion

2007 Southwest Junior College Football Conference standings
| | Conf. | | | Overall |
| Team | W | | L | W | | L |
|---|---|---|---|---|---|---|
| Kilgore †y | 5 | – | 1 | 8 | – | 4 |
| Navarro †y$ | 4 | – | 2 | 9 | – | 3 |
| Blinn † | 4 | – | 2 | 7 | – | 3 |
| Cisco † | 4 | – | 2 | 7 | – | 3 |
| Tyler | 3 | – | 3 | 5 | – | 4 |
| NE Oklahoma A&M | 1 | – | 5 | 4 | – | 5 |
| Trinity Valley | 0 | – | 6 | 2 | – | 7 |
Championship: Navarro 54, Kilgore 28
$ – Conference champion; † – Conference playoff participant; y – Championship game participant; NE Oklahoma A&M forfeited 2 games due to an ineligble player.

2007 Western States Football League standings
| | Conf. | | | Overall |
| Team | W | | L | W | | L |
|---|---|---|---|---|---|---|
| Snow $ | 8 | – | 0 | 11 | – | 1 |
| Eastern Arizona | 6 | – | 2 | 9 | – | 2 |
| Mesa (AZ) | 6 | – | 2 | 9 | – | 2 |
| Glendale (AZ) | 5 | – | 3 | 6 | – | 4 |
| Phoenix | 4 | – | 4 | 4 | – | 6 |
| Scottsdale | 3 | – | 5 | 5 | – | 5 |
| New Mexico Military | 2 | – | 6 | 3 | – | 8 |
| Arizona Western | 2 | – | 6 | 2 | – | 8 |
| Pima | 0 | – | 8 | 1 | – | 10 |
$ – Conference champion

2007 NJCAA independents football records
| | Conf. | | | Overall |
| Team | W | | L | W | | L |
|---|---|---|---|---|---|---|
| Georgia Military | | – | | 9 | – | 2 |
| Arkansas Baptist | | – | | 0 | – | 8 |

=== CCCAA ===
==== NCFA ====
2007 Coast Conference football standings
| | Conf. | | | Overall |
| Team | W | | L | W | | L |
|---|---|---|---|---|---|---|
| Cabrillo $ | 4 | – | 0 | 6 | – | 4 |
| Monterey Peninsula | 3 | – | 1 | 8 | – | 2 |
| San Jose City | 2 | – | 2 | 4 | – | 6 |
| De Anza | 1 | – | 3 | 1 | – | 8 |
| Gavilan | 0 | – | 4 | 2 | – | 8 |
$ – Conference champion

2007 NorCal Conference football standings
| | Conf. | | | Overall |
| Team | W | | L | W | | L |
|---|---|---|---|---|---|---|
| Foothill + | 5 | – | 0 | 10 | – | 0 |
| CC of San Francisco + | 5 | – | 0 | 9 | – | 1 |
| Butte | 2 | – | 2 | 6 | – | 3 |
| Santa Rosa | 1 | – | 3 | 6 | – | 3 |
| San Mateo | 1 | – | 4 | 6 | – | 4 |
| Feather River | 0 | – | 5 | 2 | – | 8 |
+ – Conference co-champions

== Postseason ==
=== Playoffs ===
==== CCCAA ====
===== SCFA =====
Semifinals; November 24; Campus sites
1 | Bakersfield | 48
4 | College of the Canyons | 45
2 | Moorpark | 35
3 | Mt. San Antonio | 59

Regional finals December 6 Campus sites
1 | Bakersfield | 42
3 | Mt. San Antonio | 347

===== NCFA =====
| Regional finals December 1 Campus sites |
| 1 | CC of San Francisco | ? |
| 2 | Sierra | ? |

===== State championship =====
| December 8 Chukchansi Park—Fresno, CA |
| 1 | CC of San Francisco | 31 |
| 3 | Mt. San Antonio | 28 |

== See also ==
- 2007 NCAA Division I FBS football season
- 2007 NCAA Division I FCS football season
- 2007 NCAA Division II football season
- 2007 NCAA Division III football season
- 2007 NAIA football season
- 2007 CIS football season
