= 2023 DuPage Chaparrals football team =

American college football season

2023 DuPage Chaparrals football

NJCAA Division III national champion

Red Grange Bowl, W 33–29 vs. Rochester C&T
- Conference: Independent
- Record: 11–1
- Head coach: Matt Rahn (3rd season)
- Offensive coordinator: Joel Beard (1st season)
- Defensive coordinator: Trevor Cipriano (4th season)

2023 NJCAA Division III independents football records
	Conf.			Overall
Team	W	L	T	W		L		T
No. 1 DuPage ^		–		11	–	1	–	0
No. 5 Louisburg		–		5	–	4	–	0
Hudson Valley		–		5	–	5	–	0
Nassau		–		5	–	5	–	0
Erie		–		3	–	7	–	0
Hocking		–		0	–	9	–	2
^ – Red Grange Bowl participate; Rankings from NJCAA Division III poll

The 2023 DuPage Chaparrals football team was an American football team that represented the College of DuPage (COD) during the 2023 junior college football season. In their third year under head coach Matt Rahn, the Chaparrals compiled an 11–1 record, defeated Rochester C&T in the Red Grange Bowl, and won the NJCA Division III national championship. It was DuPage's third consecutive national championship under Rahn.

== Schedule ==
Date	Opponent	Site	Result	Source
August 24	at Ellsworth	Iowa Falls, IA	W 17–10	
September 2	at No. 4 Rochester C&T	Rochester, MN	W 24–21	
September 9	Hocking	Bob MacDougall Field; Glen Ellyn, IL	W 45–0	
September 16	at No. 2 NDSCS	Wahpeton, ND	W 38–31	
September 23	No. 4 (D-I) Iowa Central	Bob MacDougall Field; Glen Ellyn, IL	L 14–41	
September 30	Erie	Bob MacDougall Field; Glen Ellyn, IL	W 56–2	
October 7	at Community Christian (MI)	Renaissance High School; Detroit, MI	W 17–6	
October 15	Aurora JV	Bob MacDougall Field; Glen Ellyn, IL	W 48–19	
October 21	at Hocking	Nelsonville, OH	W 39–6	
October 28	Community Christian (MI)	Bob MacDougall Field; Glen Ellyn, IL	W 56–16	
November 4	Georgia Military	Bob MacDougall Field; Glen Ellyn, IL	W 37–21	
December 2	Rochester C&T	Bob MacDougall Field; Glen Ellyn, IL (Red Grange Bowl)	W 33–29	
Rankings from Coaches' Poll released prior to the game
