= Terrence Isaac =

American football coach

Current position
- Title: Head coach
- Team: Wayne State (MI)
- Conference: GLIAC
- Record: 0–8

Biographical details
- Born: Cleveland, Ohio, U.S.

Playing career
- 1995–1996: Vermilion
- 1997–1998: Midwestern State
- 1999: Texas A&M–Commerce
- 2001: Tallahassee Thunder
- 2004: Evansville BlueCats
- 2004: Omaha Beef
- 2006: Evansville BlueCats
- Position: Wide receiver

Coaching career (HC unless noted)
- ?: Vermilion (assistant)
- ?–2012: Cedar Hill HS (TX) (assistant)
- 2013–2016: A+ Academy (TX)
- 2017–2020: Green Oaks HS (LA)
- 2021: Vermilion
- 2022–2025: Rochester C&T
- 2026–present: Wayne State (MI)

Administrative career (AD unless noted)
- 2013–2017: A+ Academy (TX)
- 2017–2020: Green Oaks HS (LA)

Head coaching record
- Overall: 0–8 (college football); 28–21 (junior college); 40–47 (high school)
- Bowls: 0–1 (junior college)
- Tournaments: 0–1 (NJCAA D-III playoffs); 5–4 (MCAC playoffs)

Accomplishments and honors

Championships
- 1 MCAC (2023)

Awards
- NJCAA Division III Coach of the Year (2023)

Terrence Isaac Sr. is an American football coach and former player. He is the head football coach at Wayne State University in Detroit, a position he has held since 2026. Isaac served as the head football coach at Minnesota North College – Vermilion in 2021 and Rochester Community and Technical College from 2022 to 2025. He was the head football coach for A+ Academy from 2013 to 2016, Green Oaks High School from 2017 to 2020, and Minnesota North College – Vermilion in 2021. He played college football for Vermilion, Midwestern State, Texas A&M–Commerce, and professionally for the Tallahassee Thunder, Evansville BlueCats, and Omaha Beef.

In 2023, after leading Rochester C&T to the Red Grange Bowl, Isaac was named National Junior College Athletic Association (NJCAA) Division III Coach of the Year.

== Head coaching record ==
=== College ===
Year	Team	Overall	Conference	Standing	Bowl/playoffs
Wayne State Warriors (Great Lakes Intercollegiate Athletic Conference) (2026–present)
2026	Wayne State	0–8	0–4		
Wayne State:		0–8	0–4		
Total:		0–8			

=== Junior college ===
Year	Team	Overall	Conference	Standing	Bowl/playoffs	NJCAA D3^{#}
Vermilion Ironmen (Minnesota College Athletic Conference) (2021)
2021	Vermilion	2–6	2–4	7th	L MCAC Quarterfinal	
Vermilion:		2–6	2–4			
Rochester C&T Yellowjackets (Minnesota College Athletic Conference) (2022–present)
2022	Rochester C&T	5–5	3–3	3rd	L MCAC Semifinal	
2023	Rochester C&T	8–3	5–1	1st	W MCAC Championship, L Red Grange Bowl	2
2024	Rochester C&T	5–5	4–2	2nd	L MCAC Semifinal	
2025	Rochester C&T	8–2	6–0	1st	L MCAC Championship	
Rochester C&T:		26–15	18–6			
Total:		28–21				
National championship Conference title Conference division title or championship game berth

=== High school ===
Year	Team	Overall	Conference	Standing	Bowl/playoffs
A+ Academy Knights () (2013–2016)
2013	A+ Academy	4–4			
2014	A+ Academy	6–6	1–2	2nd	
2015	A+ Academy	9–5	4–0	1st	
2016	A+ Academy	1–9	1–5	6th	
A+ Academy:		20–24	6–7		
Green Oaks Giants () (2017–2020)
2017	Green Oaks	3–7	0–2	3rd	
2018	Green Oaks	5–6	1–1	2nd	
2019	Green Oaks	5–7	3–1	2nd	
2020	Green Oaks	7–3	4–0	1st	
Green Oaks:		20–23	8–4		
Total:		40–47			
National championship Conference title Conference division title or championship game berth
