= 2023 Chaffey Panthers football team =

American college football season

2023 Chaffey Panthers football

AML champion

American Division Championship Bowl, W 16–12 vs Pasadena City
- Conference: American Metro League
- Record: 11–0 (5–0 AML)
- Head coach: Darrin Chiaverini (1st season)
- Home stadium: Grigsby Field

2023 American Metro League standings
| | Conf. | | | Overall |
| Team | W | | L | W | | L |
|---|---|---|---|---|---|---|
| No. 23 Chaffey $ | 5 | – | 0 | 11 | – | 0 |
| Santa Ana | 4 | – | 1 | 9 | – | 2 |
| Desert | 3 | – | 2 | 6 | – | 5 |
| West Los Angeles | 2 | – | 3 | 2 | – | 8 |
| Victor Valley | 1 | – | 4 | 1 | – | 9 |
| Compton | 0 | – | 5 | 0 | – | 10 |
$ – Conference champion; Rankings from 3C2A poll

The 2023 Chaffey Panthers football team was an American football team that represented Chaffey College as a member of the American Metro League (AML) during the 2023 junior college football season. In their first and only year under head coach Darrin Chiaverini, the Panthers compiled a perfect 11–0 record (5–0 in conference games), won the AMC championship, and defeated Pasadena City in the American Division Championship Bowl.

Key players included quarterback Dereun Dortch and running back Jayson Cortes.

The team played its home games at Grigsy Field on the school's campus in Rancho Cucamonga, California

== Schedule ==
| Date | Time | Opponent | Site | Result | Attendance | Source |
|---|---|---|---|---|---|---|
| August 19 | 9:00 a.m. | at San Bernardino Valley* | San Bernardino Valley Stadium; San Bernardino, CA | Preseason scrimmage | | |
| September 2 | 6:00 p.m. | at Los Angeles Valley* | Grigsby Field; Rancho Cucamonga, CA | W 34–9 | 327 | |
| September 9 | 6:00 p.m. | Los Angeles Pierce* | Grigsby Field; Rancho Cucamonga, CA | W 43–7 | | |
| September 16 | 1:00 p.m. | at Santa Monica* | Corsair Field; Santa Monica, CA | W 57–23 | 120 | |
| September 23 | 6:00 p.m. | at Los Angeles Southwest* | Los Angeles, CA | W 62–25 | | |
| September 30 | 6:00 p.m. | Pasadena City* | Grigsby Field; Rancho Cucamonga, CA | W 31–21 | 499 | |
| October 14 | 6:00 p.m. | West Los Angeles | Grigsby Field; Rancho Cucamonga, CA | W 62–20 | 167 | |
| October 21 | 1:00 p.m. | at Desert | Robert Boone Field; Palm Desert, CA | W 41–27 | 1,778 | |
| October 28 | | at Compton | Tay Brown Stadium; Compton, CA | W 1–0 (forfeit) | | |
| November 4 | 6:00 p.m. | Santa Ana | Grigsby Field; Rancho Cucamonga, CA | W 34–24 | | |
| November 11 | 1:00 p.m. | Victor Valley | Grigsby Field; Rancho Cucamonga, CA | W 48–7 | 175 | |
| November 25 | 5:00 p.m. | Pasadena City* | Grigsby Field; Rancho Cucamonga, CA (American Division Championship Bowl) | W 16–12 | 752 | |
*Non-conference game

== Personnel ==
=== Roster ===
2023 Chaffey Panthers football team roster
Players
Coaches
Offense

| Pos. | # | Name | Class |
|---|---|---|---|
| RB | 1 | Terryus Gibson | Fr |
| WR | 2 | Corey Cabriales | Fr |
| QB | 3 | Dereun Dortch | Fr |
| QB | 4 | Ian Eveleth | Fr |
| WR | 5 | Ayer Davis | Fr |
| WR | 6 | Dorion Levingston | Fr |
| QB | 7 | Ryder Ruiz | Fr |
| WR | 8 | Dayjiohn Wheeler | Fr |
| WR | 10 | Demajea Mitchell | Fr |
| WR | 11 | Xavier (Napoleon) Banks | Fr |
| WR | 15 | Damien Allala | Fr |
| WR | 17 | William Davis | Fr |
| TE | 23 | Pablo Estrada | Fr |
| RB | 26 | Darrin Thomas | So |
| RB | 28 | Jayson Cortes | Fr |
| RB | 30 | Brandon Oum | Fr |
| TE | 33 | Jeremiah Beck | Fr |
| RB | 38 | Brandon Rowser | Fr |
| TE | 47 | Johnny (Jonathan) Salas | Fr |
| OL | 50 | Jacob Hetrick | Fr |
| OL | 54 | Joaquin Webb | Fr |
| C | 58 | Sione Toluao | Fr |
| OL | 67 | Nathan Rodriguez | Fr |
| OL | 72 | Adrian Ledesma | Fr |
| OL | 75 | Kalobe Nevares | Fr |
| OL | 76 | Elias Lopez Lerner | Fr |
| WR | 77 | Aiden Crespo Jimenez | Fr |
| OL | 78 | Jose Carlos | Fr |
| WR | 80 | Brian Moreno | Fr |
| WR | 83 | Elisha Frisco | Fr |
| WR | 84 | Alexander Hastings | Fr |
| TE | 85 | Devin McLee | So |
| WR | 87 | Amary Eppinger | Fr |
| WR | 88 | Damari Heller | Fr |
| WR | 89 | Kamalia Anderson | Fr |
| TE | 99 | Cyele Banks | Fr |

Defense

| Pos. | # | Name | Class |
|---|---|---|---|
| DB | 1D | Azariah Levells | Fr |
| DB | 2D | Asaiah Levells-Joseph | Fr |
| DB | 3D | Damien Ford | Fr |
| S | 4D | Ryan Woods | Fr |
| S | 5D | Jordan Collins | Fr |
| DB | 6D | Davion Boyd-Phenix | Fr |
| CB | 7D | Bryce Brown Johnson | Fr |
| DB | 8D | Malachi Dhanifu | Fr |
| LB | 9D | Ra'id Bowens | So |
| LB | 12 | Syrano Ware | So |
| DB | 14 | Saadite Green Jr. | Fr |
| LB | 19 | Ronald Williams | So |
| S | 20 | Corey Davis | Fr |
| LB | 21 | Ja'Suan Munford | Fr |
| S | 22 | Gavyn France | Fr |
| S | 27 | Kobe Amio | Fr |
| S | 29 | Manaia Brown | Fr |
| LB | 31 | Kenichi Dixon | Fr |
| DB | 34 | Ryan Stewart | So |
| LB | 35 | Dallas Brown | Fr |
| S | 37 | Dejon Mitchell | Fr |
| DL | 40 | Sean Ivy | Fr |
| LB | 43 | Taunu'u Brown | So |
| DL | 45 | Luke Riestra | Fr |
| LB | 46 | DJ (Demaria) Green | Fr |
| LB | 49 | Carlos Umana III | Fr |
| LB | 51 | Caiden Wilson | Fr |
| DL | 52 | Tyler King | Fr |
| DL | 55 | Savian Faucette | Fr |
| LB | 56 | Jayden Holmes | Fr |
| LB | 57 | Zack Evans | Fr |
| LB | 59 | Lucas Stillkey | Fr |
| DL | 90 | Isaiah Ezeani | Fr |
| DL | 91 | Fa'apo Oti | Fr |
| DL | 95 | Jordan Hinojos | Fr |
| DL | 98 | Nico Guerra Uscategui | Fr |

Special teams

| Pos. | # | Name | Class |
|---|---|---|---|
| K | 18 | Anthony Hagan | Fr |

Head coach

- Darrin Chiaverini (head coach)

Coordinators/assistant coaches

- John Aldridge (assistant coach)
- Psyser Blakely (assistant coach)
- Terance Denton (assistant coach)
- Stephen Johnstone (assistant coach)
- Cade Cadam (assistant coach)
- Elliott Reyes (assistant coach)
- Ja'Cari Williams (assistant coach)
- Vincent McFarland (assistant coach)

Legend

- (C) Team captain
- (S) Suspended
- (I) Ineligible
- Injured
- Redshirt

Roster
