= Jimmy Collins (American football) =

American football player and coach

Current position
- Title: Head coach
- Team: Diablo Valley
- Conference: National Bay 6 League
- Record: 16–7

Biographical details
- Born: c. 1986 (age 39–40)

Playing career
- 2005: CC of San Francisco
- 2007–2008: Portland State
- Position: Quarterback

Coaching career (HC unless noted)
- 2009–2014: CC of San Francisco (QB)
- 2015–2023: CC of San Francisco
- 2024–present: Diablo Valley

Head coaching record
- Overall: 87–28

Accomplishments and honors

Championships
- 2 junior college national (2015, 2021); 3 National Bay 6 League (2015, 2021, 2025)

Jimmy Collins (born c. 1986) is an American junior college football coach. He is the head football coach at Diablo Valley College in Pleasant Hill, California, a position he had held since 2024. Collins served as the head football coach at City College of San Francisco (CCSF) from 2015 to 2023.

A native of Novato, California, Rogers attended Marin Catholic High School in Kentfield, California, where he played football as a quarterback. He then played at CCSF under George Rush and at Portland State University under head coach Jerry Glanville and offensive coordinator Mouse Davis. He was the quarterbacks coach at CCSF for six seasons, from 2009 to 2014, under Rush before succeeding him as head coach in 2015.

== Head coaching record ==
| Year | Team | Overall | Conference | Standing | Bowl/playoffs |
|---|---|---|---|---|---|
City College of San Francisco Rams (National Bay 6 League) (2015–2023)
| 2015 | City College of San Francisco | 12–1 | 5–0 | 1st | W San Francisco Community College, W, NCFA Championship, W CCCAA Championship |
| 2016 | City College of San Francisco | 7–4 | 4–1 | 2nd | L San Francisco Community College |
| 2017 | City College of San Francisco | 8–3 | 4–1 | 2nd | W Capital City |
| 2018 | City College of San Francisco | 7–4 | 3–2 | 3rd | L Golden State |
| 2019 | City College of San Francisco | 8–3 | 3–2 | 3rd | W Golden State |
| 2020–21 | No team—COVID-19 | | | | |
| 2021 | City College of San Francisco | 13–0 | 5–0 | 1st | W CCCAA Championship |
| 2022 | City College of San Francisco | 7–4 | 3–2 | T–3rd | W Golden State |
| 2023 | City College of San Francisco | 9–2 | 4–1 | 2nd | L NCFC Semifinal |
| City College of San Francisco: | | 71–21 | 31–9 | | |
Diablo Valley Vikings (National Bay 6 League) (2024–present)
| 2024 | Diablo Valley | 6–5 | 2–3 | 4th | W Golden Valley Bowl |
| 2025 | Diablo Valley | 10–2 | 4–1 | T–1st | L NCFC Semifinal |
| Diablo Valley: | | 16–7 | 6–4 | | |
| Total: | | 87–28 | | | |
National championship Conference title Conference division title or championship game berth
