= 2023 college football season =

2023 college football season may refer to:

== American leagues ==
- 2023 NCAA Division I FBS football season
- 2023 NCAA Division I FCS football season
- 2023 NCAA Division II football season
- 2023 NCAA Division III football season
- 2023 NAIA football season
- 2023 junior college football season

== Non-American leagues ==
- 2023 U Sports football season
