= Darrin Chiaverini =

American football player and coach (born 1977)

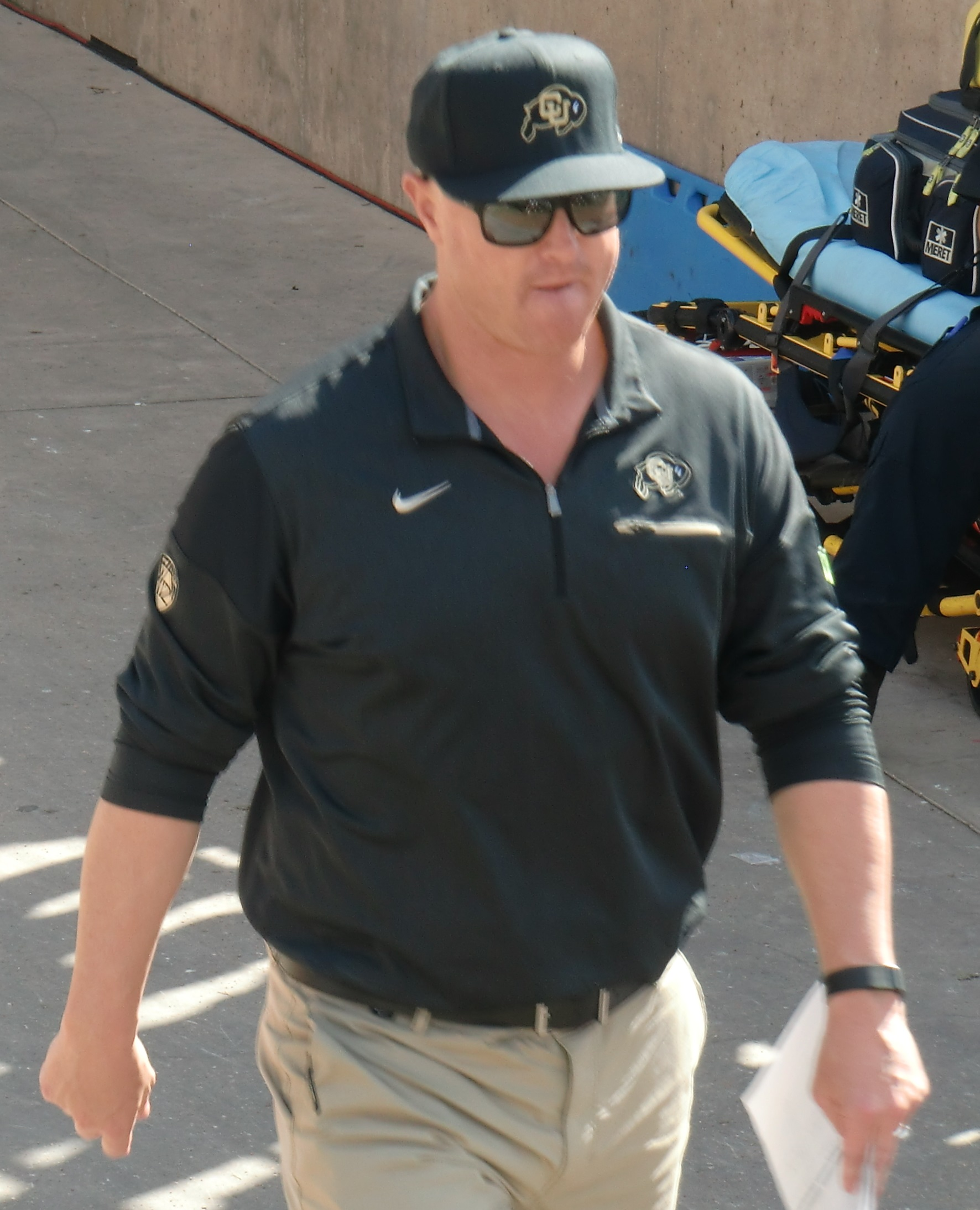
- Chiaverini in 2016

Northeastern State RiverHawks
- Title: Head coach

Personal information
- Born: October 12, 1977 (age 49); Orange County, California, U.S.
- Listed height: 6 ft 2 in (1.88 m)
- Listed weight: 225 lb (102 kg)

Career information
- High school: Corona (Corona, California)
- College: Colorado
- NFL draft: 1999: 5th round, 148th overall pick

Career history

Playing
- Cleveland Browns (1999–2000); Dallas Cowboys (2001); Atlanta Falcons (2002); Austin Wranglers (2004–2006)

Coaching
- Mt. San Antonio (2007) Wide receivers coach; Mt. San Antonio (2008) Co-offensive coordinator; UCLA (2009) Special teams assistant; Riverside City (2010–2013) Associate head coach, co-offensive coordinator, & special teams coordinator; Texas Tech (2014) Special teams coordinator; Texas Tech (2015) Special teams coordinator & outside wide receivers coach; Colorado (2016–2018) Co-offensive coordinator, wide receivers coach, & recruiting coordinator; Colorado (2019) Assistant head coach, wide receivers coach, & recruiting coordinator; Colorado (2020–2021) Offensive coordinator & wide receivers coach; UCLA (2022) Offensive analyst; Chaffey (2023) Head coach; Northeastern State (2024–present) Head coach

Awards and highlights
- Second-team All-Big 12 (1998); 2025 College Football Network Coach Of The Year; 2026 D2 Spotlight Coach Of The Year Finalist

Career NFL statistics
- Games played: 49
- Receptions: 62
- Receiving yards: 662
- Avg.: 10.7
- Touchdowns: 7
- Stats at Pro Football Reference

Career AFL statistics
- Receptions: 213
- Receiving yards: 1,983
- Touchdowns: 35
- Total tackles: 72
- Interceptions: 4
- Stats at ArenaFan.com

Head coaching record
- Postseason: 2-0 Bowls 2023 American Division Championship Bowl 2025 First Americans Bowl Champions
- Career: College: 18–15 (.545); Junior college: 11–0 (1.000)

Darrin Earl Chiaverini (born October 12, 1977) is an American college football coach and former wide receiver. He is the head football coach for Northeastern State University, a position he has held since 2024. He played college football at Colorado. He was drafted in the fifth round (148th overall) of the 1999 NFL draft by the Cleveland Browns.

During his career, he also played for the Dallas Cowboys and Atlanta Falcons of the National Football League (NFL). He was formerly the special teams coordinator and outside wide receivers coach for Texas Tech prior to joining the Colorado coaching staff.

== Early life ==
Chiaverini attended Corona High School. As a sophomore, he made 20 receptions for 340 yards and 2 touchdowns, receiving All-league honors. As a junior, he had 70 receptions for 1,116 yards and 10 touchdowns, with 4 interceptions while playing free safety. He received All-league, All-county and All-CIF honors.

== College career ==
As a senior, he led the team with 52 receptions for 630 yards and 5 touchdowns. He finished his college career with 97 receptions (seventh in school history), 1,199 receiving yards and 6 touchdowns. In 1998, he won the inaugural Buffalo Heart Award given to the Colorado Buffalo player that best "demonstrates grit, determination and toughness."

== Professional career ==
Pre-draft measurables
| Height | Weight | Arm length | Hand span | 40-yard dash | 10-yard split | 20-yard split | 20-yard shuttle | Vertical jump |
|---|---|---|---|---|---|---|---|---|
| 6 ft 1 1/8 in (1.86 m) | 212 lb (96 kg) | 29 1/2 in (0.75 m) | 9 in (0.23 m) | 4.53 s | 1.57 s | 2.60 s | 4.16 s | 33.0 in (0.84 m) |
All values from NFL Combine

=== Cleveland Browns ===
Chiaverini was selected by the Cleveland Browns in the fifth round (148th overall) of the 1999 NFL draft, who were returning to the NFL as an expansion team following the original team's 1996 relocation to Baltimore. He appeared in 16 games and started 8 contests in place of an injured Leslie Shepherd. He ranked fifth among NFL rookies with 44 catches (fifth-highest by a rookie in club history) and sixth with 487 yards (sixth-highest by a rookie in club history), to go along with four touchdowns. He holds the Browns' record for most catches by a rookie in a game with 10 receptions (for 108 yards and a touchdown) against the Jacksonville Jaguars.

=== Dallas Cowboys ===
On August 28, 2001, he was traded to the Dallas Cowboys in exchange for a conditional seventh round draft choice (not exercised). He was mostly used as the third receiver, recording 10 receptions for 107 yards and two touchdowns, He was released on June 13, 2002.

=== Atlanta Falcons ===
On July 2, 2002, he was signed as a free agent by the Atlanta Falcons.

=== Austin Wranglers ===
In 2004, Chiaverini was signed by the Austin Wranglers of the Arena Football League (AFL).

== Coaching career ==
Chiaverini began his coaching career in 2007 as the wide receiver coach for Mt. San Antonio College. In 2008, he was promoted to co-offensive coordinator.

In January 2010, Chiaverini was hired by Riverside City College (RCC) as associate head coach, co-offensive/special teams/recruiting coordinator.

Chiaverini also served as the special teams coordinator in the East-West Shrine Game under former NFL Head Coach Jerry Glanville in 2013 and 2014 for the East Team.

In 2009, Chiaverini was the assistant special teams coach under Frank Gansz, Jr. for the UCLA Bruins.

On January 16, 2013, Chiaverini was named the special teams coordinator for Texas Tech, becoming the first full-time special teams coach at the school since 2009. In 2014 Texas Tech improved from last in the conference in Net Punting in the Big 12 Conference in 2013 to 2nd in the Conference in 2014 with a 42.2 Net Average. Texas Tech also Ranked 2nd in Kickoff Coverage in 2014 with a net average of 40 yards with Oklahoma and Kansas St. During the 2014 season, Kicker Ryan Bustin set the school record for field goals made with 50. Texas Tech was also plus three in the NCAA in +/- ratio in 2014 on Special Teams. In 2015, Chiaverini was named the outside wide receivers coach in addition to his special teams duties.

Chiaverini also served as recruiting coordinator for the Buffaloes and in 2017 Coachingsearch.com reported that Colorado had the most improved recruiting class in the nation as they improved 32 spots to have the 35th ranked recruiting class in the country according to 247sports.com. Scout.com reported that Colorado had a Top 30 class nationally and was their highest-ranked class in over a decade. Chiaverini was instrumental in landing Colorado another top-35 recruiting class in 2020.

On February 12, 2020, Chiaverini was named the interim head coach at Colorado following the departure of Mel Tucker, who left for Michigan State the night before.

On November 28, 2021, Chiaverini was fired as offensive coordinator. During the 2021 season, he guided a Buffaloes offense that finished with one of the worst seasons in school history.

Chiaverini was hired in March 2022 by UCLA Head Coach Chip Kelly as an Offensive Analyst.

Chiaverini was hired by Chaffey College in May 2023.

Chiaverini accepted the Head Coaching position at Northeastern State University in December of 2023.

== Personal life ==
Chiaverini resides in Corona, California, with his wife Shannon and their two children. In 2005, he was cast in the film The Longest Yard.

Chiaverini's father, Ed, was an original member of the surf rock band The Lively Ones in the early 1960s.

== Head coaching record ==
=== Junior college ===
| Year | Team | Overall | Conference | Standing | Bowl/playoffs |
|---|---|---|---|---|---|
Chaffey Panthers (American Metro League) (2023)
| 2023 | Chaffey | 11–0 | 5–0 | 1st | W American Division Championship Bowl |
| Chaffey: | | 11–0 | 5–0 | | |
| Total: | | 11–0 | | | |
National championship Conference title Conference division title or championship game berth

=== College ===
| Year | Team | Overall | Conference | Standing | Bowl/playoffs | AFCA^{#} | D2^{°} |
|---|---|---|---|---|---|---|---|
Northeastern State RiverHawks (NCAA Division II independent) (2024–present)
| 2024 | Northeastern State | 2–9 | | | | | |
| 2025 | Northeastern State | 9–3 | | | W First Americans | | 24 |
| Northeastern State: | | 18-15 | | | | | |
| Total: | | 18-15 | | | | | |
