= 2020–21 junior college football season =

American junior college football season

2020 junior college football season
- National Championship: War Memorial Stadium; Little Rock, AR; June 5, 2020
- Champion(s): Hutchinson (NJCAA)

The 2020–21 junior college football season was the season of intercollegiate junior college football running from September 2020 to June 2021. Due to the COVID-19 pandemic, only a few games were played during the traditional fall season, except for the entirety of the Mississippi Association of Community and Junior Colleges season.

In the California Community College Athletic Association (CCCAA), the season concluded with the end of the regular season, as the playoffs and championship game were not held due to the pandemic. The National Junior College Athletic Association (NJCAA) held its championship game in June which featured Hutchinson beating Snow 29–27 in the NJCAA National Football Championship.

== Conference standings ==
=== NJCAA ===
2020–21 Iowa Community College Athletic Conference football standings
	Conf.			Overall
Team	W		L	W		L
No. 4 Iowa Western $	4	–	0	7	–	1
No. 10 Iowa Central	2	–	2	6	–	3
Ellsworth	0	–	4	2	–	6
$ – Conference champion; Rankings from NJCAA poll

2020–21 Northeast Football Conference standings
	Conf.			Overall
Team	W		L	W		L
Lackawanna	0	–	0	1	–	1

2020–21 Kansas Jayhawk Community College Conference football standings
	Conf.			Overall
Team	W		L	W		L
No. 1 Hutchinson $^	6	–	0	8	–	0
No. 5 Garden City	6	–	1	7	–	1
No. 7 Independence	5	–	2	5	–	2
Coffeyville	3	–	3	3	–	3
Butler (KS)	2	–	4	2	–	4
Dodge City	1	–	5	2	–	5
Highland (KS)	1	–	6	1	–	6
Fort Scott	0	–	3	0	–	3
$ – Conference champion; ^ – NJCAA playoff participant; Rankings from NJCAA poll

2020–21 Southwest Junior College Football Conference standings
	Conf.			Overall
Team	W		L	W		L
No. 3 Cisco $	7	–	0	7	–	0
No. 6 Kilgore	6	–	1	7	–	1
No. 8 Trinity Valley	5	–	2	6	–	2
No. 9 New Mexico Military	4	–	3	5	–	4
Navarro	3	–	4	3	–	4
Tyler	2	–	5	4	–	5
Northeastern Oklahoma A&M	1	–	6	1	–	7
Blinn	0	–	7	1	–	7
$ – Conference champion; Rankings from NJCAA poll

2020–21 Mississippi Association of Community and Junior Colleges football standings
	Conf.			Overall
Team	W		L	W		L
North Division
Northwest Mississippi xy$	6	–	0	6	–	0
Northeast Mississippi	5	–	1	5	–	1
Coahoma	3	–	2	3	–	2
Itawamba	2	–	3	2	–	3
Mississippi Delta	0	–	4	0	–	4
Holmes	0	–	5	0	–	5
South Division
Mississippi Gulf Coast xy	5	–	1	5	–	1
Hinds	3	–	1	3	–	1
Copiah–Lincoln	2	–	1	2	–	1
Jones (MS)	3	–	2	3	–	2
East Central (MS)	2	–	3	2	–	3
Pearl River	2	–	4	2	–	4
Southwest Mississippi	0	–	6	0	–	6
Championship: Northwest Mississippi 40, Mississippi Gulf Coast 13
$ – Conference champion; x – Division champion/co-champions; y – Championship game participant

2020–21 NJCAA independents football records
	Conf.			Overall
Team	W		L	W		L
No. 2 Snow ^		–		8	–	1
Hocking		–		2	–	1
ASA Miami		–		3	–	2
Arkansas Baptist		–		1	–	3
Sussex County		–		1	–	3
^ – NJCAA playoff participant; Rankings from NJCAA poll

=== CCCAA ===
2020–21 California Community College Athletic Association football standings
	Conf.			Overall
Team	W		L	W		L
American Mountain League
Antelope Valley	0	–	0	2	–	0
National Norcal League
College of the Siskiyous	1	–	0	2	–	2
Shasta	0	–	0	3	–	1
Feather River	0	–	1	1	–	3
National Valley League
College of the Sequoias	0	–	0	0	–	2

== See also ==
- 2020 NCAA Division I FBS football season
- 2020–21 NCAA Division I FCS football season
- 2020–21 NCAA Division II football season
- 2020–21 NCAA Division III football season
- 2020–21 NAIA football season
- 2020 U Sports football season
