= Midwest Football Conference =

The Midwest Football Conference was a football conference for National Junior College Athletic Association (NJCAA) teams located in the Midwestern United States. It was formed when the North Central Community College Conference merged with the Iowa Community College Athletic Conference in 2005.

The conference dissolved following the 2013 season after almost all of the East Division schools, except the College of DuPage, dropped football. The Iowa schools, Ellsworth Community College, Iowa Central Community College and Iowa Western Community College, formed a scheduling alliance with the Kansas Jayhawk Community College Conference. The two North Dakota schools joined the Minnesota Community College Conference in football only while DuPage became an independent.

Grand Rapids, Harper, Joliet, Rock Valley and North Iowa Area no longer field teams.

== Former members ==
East division

School	Team Name	Location
College of DuPage	Chaparrals	Glen Ellyn, Illinois
Grand Rapids Community College	Raiders	Grand Rapids, Michigan
Harper College	Hawks	Palatine, Illinois
Joliet Junior College	Wolves	Joliet, Illinois
Rock Valley College	Golden Eagles	Rockford, Illinois

West division

School	Team Name	Location
Ellsworth Community College	Panthers	Iowa Falls, Iowa
Iowa Central Community College	Tritons	Fort Dodge, Iowa
Iowa Western Community College	Reivers	Council Bluffs, Iowa
North Dakota State College of Science	Wildcats	Wahpeton, North Dakota
North Iowa Area Community College	Trojans	Mason City, Iowa

== Yearly standings ==
2005 Midwest Football Conference standings
	Conf.			Overall
Team	W		L	W		L
Grand Rapids #+	7	–	1	9	–	1
Iowa Central #+	6	–	2	9	–	2
Harper #	6	–	2	7	–	3
Joliet #	4	–	4	6	–	6
Rock Valley #	4	–	4	5	–	5
NDSCS #	4	–	4	5	–	6
Ellsworth	2	–	6	3	–	6
North Iowa Area	2	–	6	2	–	6
DuPage	1	–	7	2	–	7
+ – Conference co-champions; # – MFC playoff participant Grand Rapids and Iowa Central were named East Division and West Division champions respectively despite the conference not being split into divisions and were ultimately crowned as co-champions

2006 Midwest Football Conference standings
	Conf.			Overall
Team	W		L	W		L
East Division
Joliet #x	6	–	2	7	–	4
Grand Rapids #y$	5	–	3	8	–	3
Harper	5	–	3	6	–	4
Rock Valley	3	–	5	4	–	6
DuPage	1	–	7	2	–	7
West Division
Iowa Central #x	7	–	1	9	–	2
North Iowa Area #y	5	–	3	7	–	4
Ellsworth	3	–	5	4	–	5
NDSCS	1	–	7	2	–	7
Championship: Grand Rapids 24, North Iowa Area 6
$ – Conference champion; x – Division champion/co-champions; y – Championship game participant; # – MFC playoff participant

2007 Midwest Football Conference standings
	Conf.			Overall
Team	W		L	W		L
East Division
Joliet #xy$	6	–	2	10	–	2
DuPage	5	–	3	6	–	4
Harper #	4	–	4	6	–	6
Grand Rapids	4	–	4	4	–	5
Rock Valley	1	–	7	2	–	7
West Division
Iowa Central #x	7	–	1	9	–	2
North Iowa Area #y	5	–	3	7	–	4
Ellsworth	3	–	5	4	–	5
NDSCS	1	–	7	2	–	7
Championship: Joliet 28, North Iowa Area 21
$ – Conference champion; x – Division champion/co-champions; y – Championship game participant; # – MFC playoff participant

2008 Midwest Football Conference standings
	Conf.			Overall
Team	W		L	W		L
East Division
Harper x	7	–	1	11	–	1
DuPage	4	–	4	6	–	6
Grand Rapids	3	–	5	3	–	7
Joliet	3	–	5	4	–	6
Rock Valley	2	–	6	3	–	6
West Division
Ellsworth	7	–	1	8	–	3
Iowa Central x	5	–	3	8	–	3
NDSCS	3	–	5	5	–	5
North Iowa Area	2	–	6	3	–	6
$ – Conference champion; x – Division champion/co-champions

2009 Midwest Football Conference standings
	Conf.			Overall
Team	W		L	W		L
East Division
No. 3 Grand Rapids x	7	–	1	9	–	2
Joliet	4	–	4	7	–	5
DuPage	4	–	4	5	–	5
Harper	2	–	6	2	–	7
Rock Valley	0	–	8	1	–	8
West Division
No. 13 Ellsworth x	6	–	2	8	–	3
Iowa Central	5	–	3	6	–	3
NDSCS	4	–	4	6	–	6
Iowa Western	4	–	4	5	–	4
x – Division champion/co-champions; Rankings from NJCAA poll

2010 Midwest Football Conference standings
	Conf.			Overall
Team	W		L	W		L
East Division
Grand Rapids x	6	–	1	10	–	2
DuPage	3	–	4	7	–	5
Harper	1	–	6	2	–	7
Joliet	0	–	7	2	–	8
West Division
Iowa Western	7	–	0	9	–	2
Ellsworth x	5	–	2	8	–	3
Iowa Central	4	–	3	7	–	3
NDSCS	2	–	5	4	–	5
x – Division champion/co-champions

2011 Midwest Football Conference standings
	Conf.			Overall
Team	W		L	W		L
East Division
Grand Rapids xy$	7	–	0	10	–	0
DuPage	4	–	3	7	–	3
Joliet	3	–	4	4	–	5
Harper	1	–	6	5	–	6
West Division
Iowa Western xy	6	–	1	9	–	2
Iowa Central	3	–	4	6	–	4
NDSCS	3	–	4	5	–	4
Ellsworth	1	–	6	2	–	7
Championship: Grand Rapids 26, Iowa Western 24
$ – Conference champion; x – Division champion/co-champions; y – Championship game participant

2012 Midwest Football Conference standings
	Conf.			Overall
Team	W		L	W		L
Iowa Western $	4	–	0	12	–	0
Ellsworth	3	–	1	7	–	4
DuPage	2	–	2	8	–	2
Iowa Central	1	–	3	6	–	5
NDSCS	0	–	4	3	–	6
$ – Conference champion

2013 Midwest Football Conference standings
	Conf.			Overall
Team	W		L	W		L
No. 2 Iowa Western $	8	–	0	11	–	1
DuPage	6	–	2	7	–	4
Iowa Central	3	–	5	6	–	5
NDSCS	2	–	6	3	–	7
Ellsworth	1	–	7	2	–	8
$ – Conference champion; Rankings from NJCAA poll
