= Feather River College =

Community college in Quincy, California, U.S.

- Motto: Small college, mountains of opportunity
- Type: Public
- Established: 1968
- Parent institution: California Community Colleges system
- President: Kevin Trutna
- Students: 1,600+ full time students enrolled in 2014/2015
- Location: Quincy, California, U.S. 39.95065°N 120.96985°W
- Colors: Green & yellow
- Nickname: Golden Eagles
- Mascot: Golden Eagle
- Website: www.frc.edu

Feather River College (FRC) is a community college in Quincy, California. The school serves an annual full-time enrolled student body of approximately 1,500 students.

== History ==
Feather River College was established in 1968 to support the need for higher education in rural Plumas County. In April 1971 Feather River College moved from its temporary site at the Plumas County Fairgrounds in Quincy to its present location. A member of the distant Peralta Community College District for many years, Feather River College's petition to de-annex from the district was granted in July 1988, and Feather River College became an independent, locally controlled community college district.

== Setting ==
=== Campus ===
FRC is a 256-acre (104 ha) campus adjacent to Plumas National Forest land. There are student residence halls on campus. Facilities include an equine and rodeo arenas, pasture-land, and sports facilities. The surrounding wildlands are used by the college's Environmental Studies and Outdoor Recreation leadership programs. In January 2020, FRC became only the third college in America to be designated as a Firewise college, after efforts from students and faculty in the Environmental Studies and Outdoor Recreation Leadership departments.

=== Housing options ===
Student apartments are available on campus, a short walk from the main campus. The residence halls and apartments are managed on-site and include residence assistance, security, and student activities.

== Academics ==
Feather River College offers the Associate in Arts degree, Associate in Science degree, and certificates, as well as a Bachelor of Science degree in Equine and Ranch Management and a Bachelor of Science Degree in Ecosystem Restoration and Applied Fire Management.

=== Phi Theta Kappa Honor Society ===
The Feather River College Phi Theta Kappa chapter was founded in 1993.

== Demographics ==
Student Population (total head-count for Fall 2015, including on and off-campus students served): 1,705

- Male: 761; 44.63%
- Female: 942; 55.25%
- Unknown: 2; .12%

Ethnicities

- African-American: 217; 12.73%
- American Indian/Alaskan Native: 36; 2.11%
- Asian: 46; 2.70%
- Filipino: 15; 0.88%
- Hispanic: 353: 20.70%
- Multi-Ethnicity: 5; 0.29%
- Pacific Islander: 19; 1.11%
- Unknown: 68; 3.99%
- White Non-Hispanic: 946; 55.48%

Age

- 19 or less: 409; 23.99%
- 20–24: 405: 23.75%
- 25–29: 233: 13.67%
- 30–34: 175; 10.26%
- 35–39: 108; 6.33%
- 40–49: 203; 11.91%
- 50 +: 171; 10.03%
- Unknown: 1; 0.44%

== Student life ==
=== Student clubs ===
Some of the student clubs at FRC are:

- Art Club
- Debate Club
- Enactus
- Equine Club
- International Culture Club
- Math Club
- Phi Theta Kappa honor society
- STE^2AM Team (Science, Technology, Engineering, Entrepreneurship, Art and Mathematics Club)
- Student Environmental Association (SEA)

=== Athletics ===
Feather River College offers eight women's sports and five men's sports. These sports include basketball, volleyball, football, soccer, softball, baseball, rodeo, cross country, track and field and sand volleyball. FRC has academic advising for athletes, as well as athletic trainers. Training facilities available to student athletes include an on-campus gymnasium, weight room, track, practice fields and an off-campus fitness center. The campus and surrounding area also feature hundreds of acres for outdoor training. In 2019, the women's volleyball team won the first state sports championship in school history after a 35–2 season with a win over previously undefeated Irvine Valley College. Following this, setter Mere Nagase became the first AVCA All-American Award winner in school history.
