= Rochester Community and Technical College =

Public college in Rochester, Minnesota, US

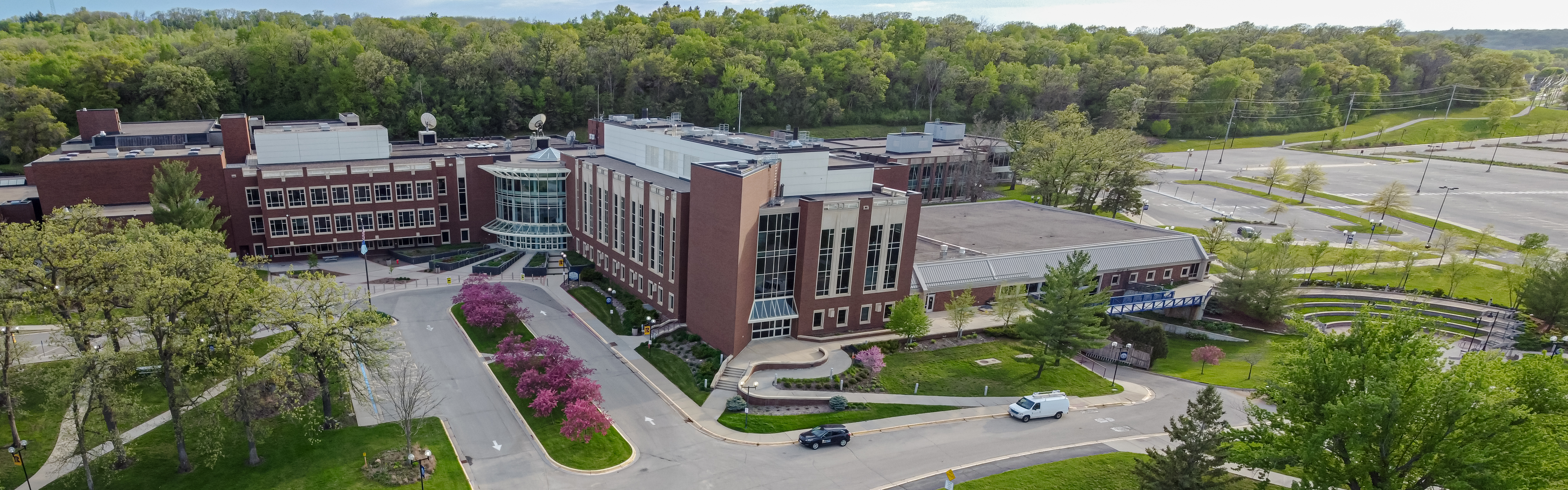
- Former names: Rochester Junior College (1915-1964); Rochester State Junior College (1964-1973)
- Type: Public community college
- Established: 1915; 111 years ago
- Parent institution: Minnesota State Colleges and Universities
- Accreditation: HLC
- President: Jeffery Boyd
- Students: 8,000
- Location: Rochester, Minnesota, United States; 44.014°N 92.423°W
- Colors: Navy and Gold
- Nickname: Yellowjackets
- Mascot: Sting
- Website: rctc.edu

Rochester Community and Technical College (RCTC) is a public community college in Rochester, Minnesota. It serves more than 8,000 students annually. The college was founded in 1915 on a motion by Charles Mayo to the Rochester School Board and is Minnesota's oldest original community college.

RCTC offers more than 70 programs and over 130 credential options with varying delivery options (whether online, in-person, or hybrid). The college has partnered with Winona State University to establish more than a dozen Path to Purple programs that allow students to complete a four-year degree without leaving Rochester. RCTC is accredited by the Higher Learning Commission and is a member of the Minnesota State Colleges and Universities System.

== History ==
On August 23, 1915, Charles Mayo made a motion at a meeting of the Rochester (MN) School Board to add two years of university work to the high school. The board voted unanimously for adoption. The original school consisted of four faculty members and 17 students. Classes were held in what was called the “University Department” or the “Southern University.” In June 1917, Rochester Junior College (RJC) graduated its first 10 students at a joint commencement program with the high school. After joining the Minnesota State Junior College System, Rochester Junior College's name was changed in 1964 to Rochester State Junior College (RSJC). The state legislature renamed the College Rochester Community College in 1973.

The start of what was to become Rochester Area Vocational Technical Institute dates back to 1944 when adult vocational classes were first introduced as part of the Rochester Evening College. By 1966 construction of a separate facility for RSJC was underway. The original technical college building of 78,000 square feet was completed in 1969. When the technical college opened in 1969, it offered 15 program majors and enrolled 213 students. In 1971 a 14,000 square feet addition to the technical college doubled the size of the cafeteria, added four classrooms and a carpentry shop, and expanded the machine shop. In 1987 Rochester Area Vocational Technical Institute (RAVTI) became Rochester Technical Institute.

A 70,000 square foot, two-story addition to the technical college was completed in 1987 and provided facilities to accommodate the move toward the restructured, credit-based delivery of instruction. It included classrooms and labs for all health and services programs, classrooms for the custom training services division, a child-care center, student commons, media center, reading room, student services office, and offices for administration. In 1989, Rochester Technical Institute was renamed Rochester Technical College. On July 1, 1991, Rochester Technical College merged with Austin Technical College and Faribault Technical College to form Joint Vocational Technical District 2501, also known as Minnesota Riverland Technical College.

Minnesota Riverland Technical College-Rochester and Rochester Community College officially consolidated on July 1, 1996, to form Rochester Community and Technical College (RCTC).

== Academics ==
RCTC offers certificates, diplomas, associate of arts degrees, associate of fine arts degrees, associate of science degrees, and associate of applied science degrees.

Because of the proximity of Mayo Clinic to RCTC, many of the programs offered are medically focused, and a few are awarded in conjunction with the Mayo School of Health Sciences, including Cardiovascular Invasive Specialist, Clinical Research Coordinator, Clinical Neurophysiology Technology, and Histology.

RCTC also offers a number of continuing education and custom training program for individuals, business, and industry. Services include designing specific training for organizations, allied health continuing education, entrepreneurship offerings, small business development, and continuing education of general interest.

=== Accreditation ===
RCTC is accredited by the Higher Learning Commission. Several programs of study are also accredited, including many of the medically related programs.

== Athletics ==
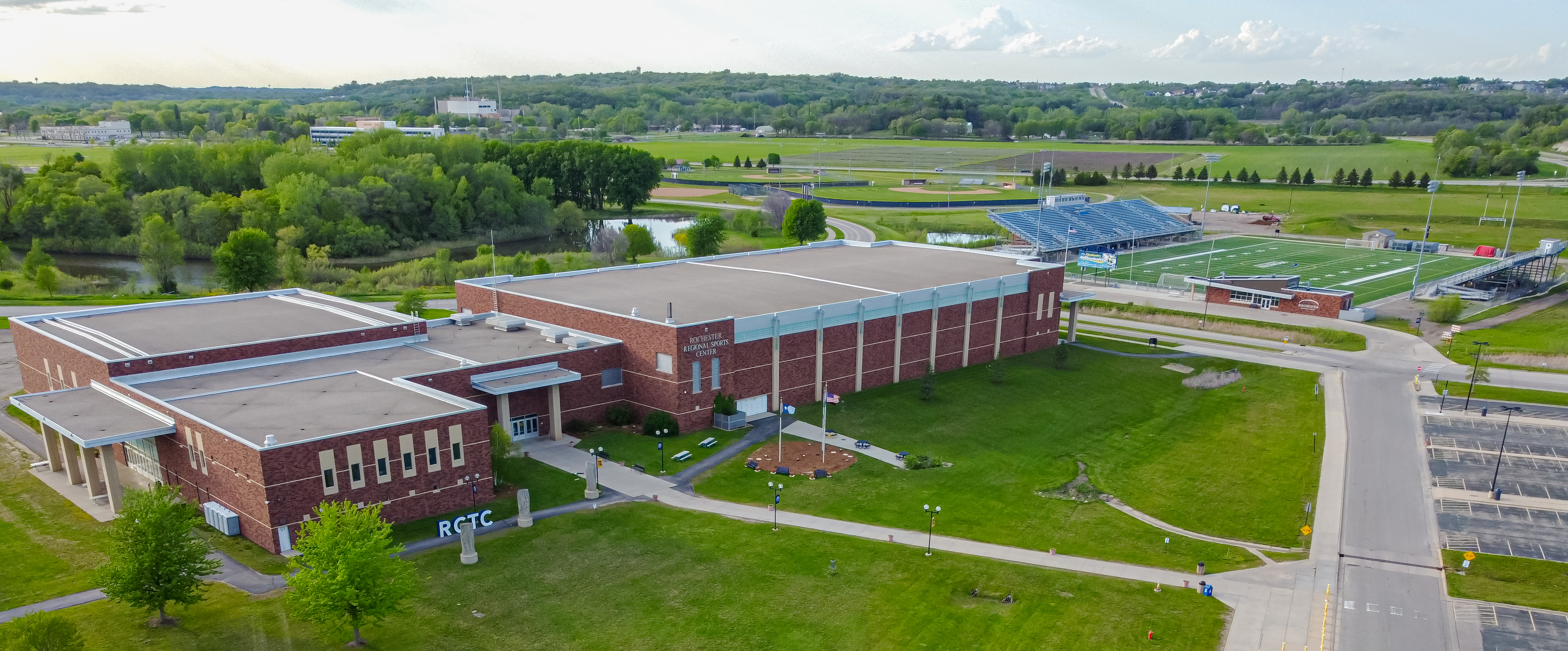
Rochester Regional Sports Center and field

The RCTC Yellowjackets are the athletics team of RCTC athletic program. The Yellowjackets are members of the Minnesota College Athletic Conference and the National Junior College Athletic Association. They compete in ten varsity sports.

In the 1960s, Rochester Junior College established a hockey program for its students with assistance from Ken Johannson of the Rochester Mustangs.

== Facilities ==
The RCTC campus consists of the RCTC Main Building, Heintz Center, and the Rochester Regional Sports Center and Stadium.

The Main Building contains several sections: Art Hall, Atrium, Coffman, College Center, East Hall, Endicott Hall, Goddard Library, Health Sciences, Hill Theater, Memorial Hall, Plaza Hall, Science and Technology, Singley Hall, and Student Services.

The Career and Technical Education Center at Heintz Center construction is scheduled to be complete Summer of 2016.

Construction of a replacement for Memorial and Plaza Halls began in 2018. The $22.9 million project features construction of new space, renovation of existing spaces, and demolition of four buildings including Plaza Hall, Memorial Hall, the old Maintenance Garage, and the old Child Care Center. The anticipated completion date is July 31, 2020.

== See also ==
- Technology education
- Career and Technical Education
