= Coffeyville Red Ravens =

Sports teams of Coffeyville Community College

- University: Coffeyville Community College
- Nickname: Red Ravens
- Association: NJCAA
- Conference: Kansas Jayhawk Community College Conference
- Athletic director: Jeff Leiker
- Location: Coffeyville, Kansas
- Varsity teams: 18
- Football stadium: Veteran's Memorial Stadium
- Basketball arena: Nellis Hall
- Baseball stadium: Walter Johnson Park
- Softball stadium: Byers Field
- Colors: Red and white
- Fight song: Fight Song (Mp3 version)
- Website: www.coffeyville.edu/athletics/

The Coffeyville Community College Red Ravens are the sports teams of Coffeyville Community College, located in Coffeyville, Kansas, United States. They participate in the NJCAA and in the Kansas Jayhawk Community College Conference.

== Sports ==
Men's sports

- Baseball
- Basketball
- Cross country
- Football
- Golf
- Rodeo
- Soccer
- Spirit squads
- Track & field

Women's sports

- Basketball
- Cross country
- Golf
- Rodeo
- Soccer
- Softball
- Spirit squads
- Track & field
- Volleyball

=== National Title seasons ===
The Coffeyville Red Ravens have won eight national titles since 1956.

National Title seasons
Season	Sport
1956	Football
1960	Track and Field
1960	Cross Country
1962	Men's Basketball
1983	Football
1990	Football
2003	UCA Cheer
2017	Women's Volleyball (DII)
2018	Women's Volleyball (DII)
2021	Men's Basketball

== Facilities ==
- Byers Field – home of the softball team
- Nellis Hall – home of the men and women's basketball teams
- Pumpkin Creek Equestrian Center – home of the rodeo teams
- Veteran's Memorial Stadium – home of the football, soccer, and track & field teams
- Walter Johnson Park – home of the baseball team

== Notable alumni ==
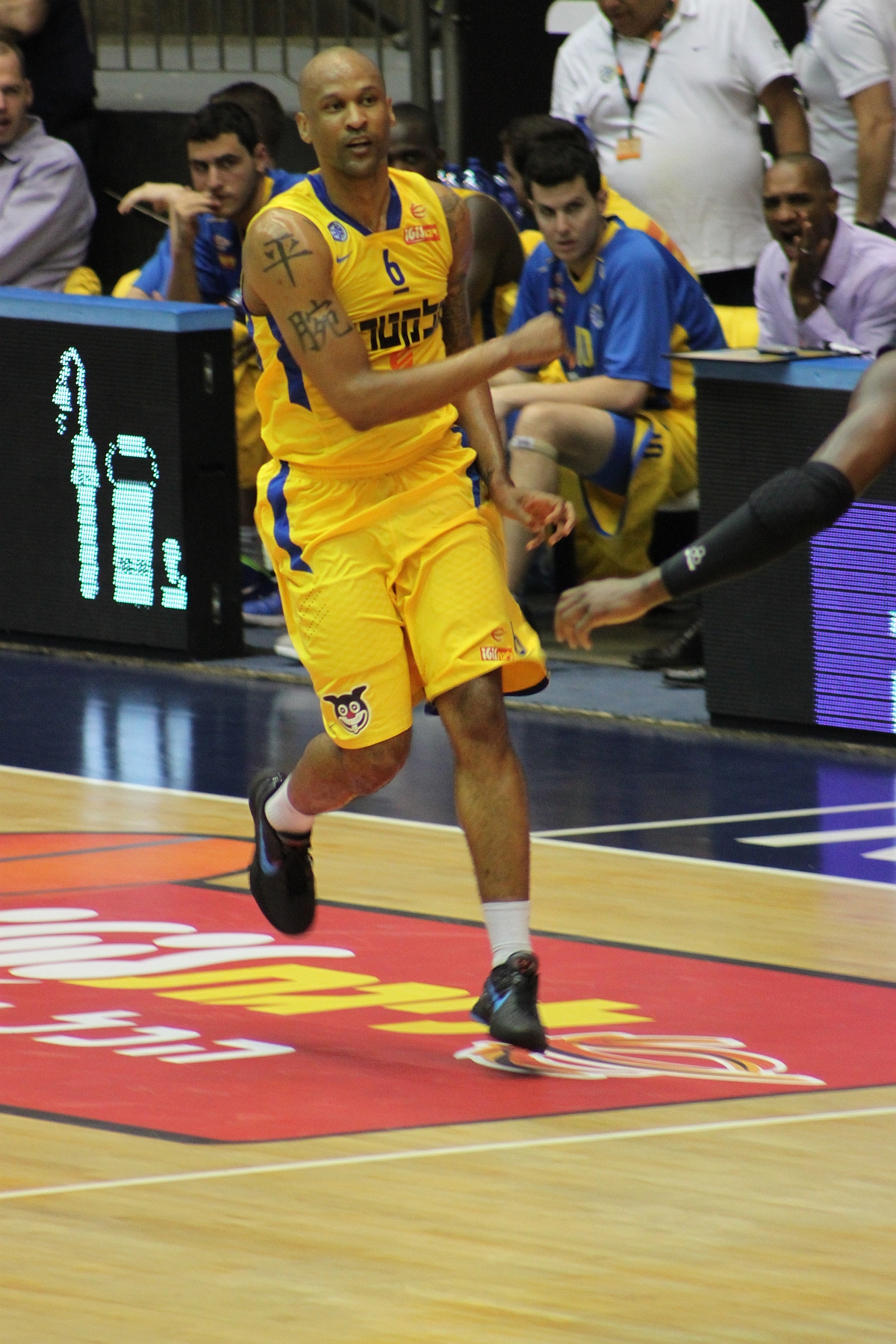
Devin Smith

- Akin Ayodele, NFL Linebacker, free agent
- James Carpenter, NFL offensive guard, Seattle Seahawks
- Duron Carter former NFL Player and CFL Player
- Andre De Grasse, Canadian Olympic sprinter
- Buster Douglas, world heavyweight boxing champion
- Maurice "Lil Mo" Douglass, former defensive back, Chicago Bears
- Reggie Evans, NBA player Brooklyn Nets
- Bishop Fitzgerald, NFL player for the Detroit Lions
- Mel Gray, former return specialist, Detroit Lions
- Brandon Jacobs, NFL running back, New York Giants
- Ryan Lilja, former NFL offensive lineman, Indianapolis Colts and Kansas City Chiefs
- Reggie Nelson, NFL safety, Jacksonville Jaguars
- Quinton Patton, NFL wide receiver, San Francisco 49ers
- Mike Rozier, 1983 Heisman Trophy winner
- Devin Smith, professional basketball player, Maccabi Tel Aviv
- Paul Soliai, NFL defensive tackle, Miami Dolphins
- Ron Springs, football player
- Siran Stacy, former professional football player, Philadelphia Eagles
- Devin Thomas, NFL wide receiver, Washington Redskins
- Keith Traylor, former defensive lineman, Kansas City Chiefs
- Jeff Wright, NFL defensive tackle, Buffalo Bills
