= Ellsworth Community College =

Community college in Iowa Falls, Iowa, U.S.

Coordinates: 42.527692°N 93.26632°W

Ellsworth Community College is a public community college in Iowa Falls, Iowa. It was founded as Ellsworth College in 1890 by Eugene S. Ellsworth. Originally a private business academy, it became a four-year college, a music conservatory, and a public junior college before being absorbed into the Iowa Valley Community College District in 1968.

== Academics ==
Ellsworth Community College offers three distinct degree programs. Arts and Science Degrees are two-year degrees geared toward students who wish to enter the professional workforce but do not plan to earn a degree from a four-year college. Some of the credits earned under this degree program can be transferred to a four-year university. Career/technical degrees and diplomas provide hands-on training in a variety of vocational fields. The course of study lasts anywhere from nine months to two years. Associate degrees are intended for students who plan to continue their education at a four-year college. The coursework for these degrees is identical to that offered during the freshman and sophomore years at Iowa's three state universities; any student who transfers to one of them with an associate degree is automatically granted junior (third-year) standing.

== Athletics ==
The Ellsworth athletic teams are called the Panthers. The community college is a member of the National Junior College Athletic Association (NJCAA), primarily competing in the Iowa Community College Athletic Conference (ICCAC) at the Division I and Division II levels.

Ellsworth competes in seven intercollegiate varsity sports: Men's sports include baseball, basketball, football and wrestling; while women's sports include basketball, softball and volleyball.

=== Mascot ===
The Panthers' mascot is named Pounce.

=== Accomplishments ===
The Ellsworth football team has won two NJCAA national championships. The school also won an NJCAA national championship in basketball in 1971.

== Notable alumni ==
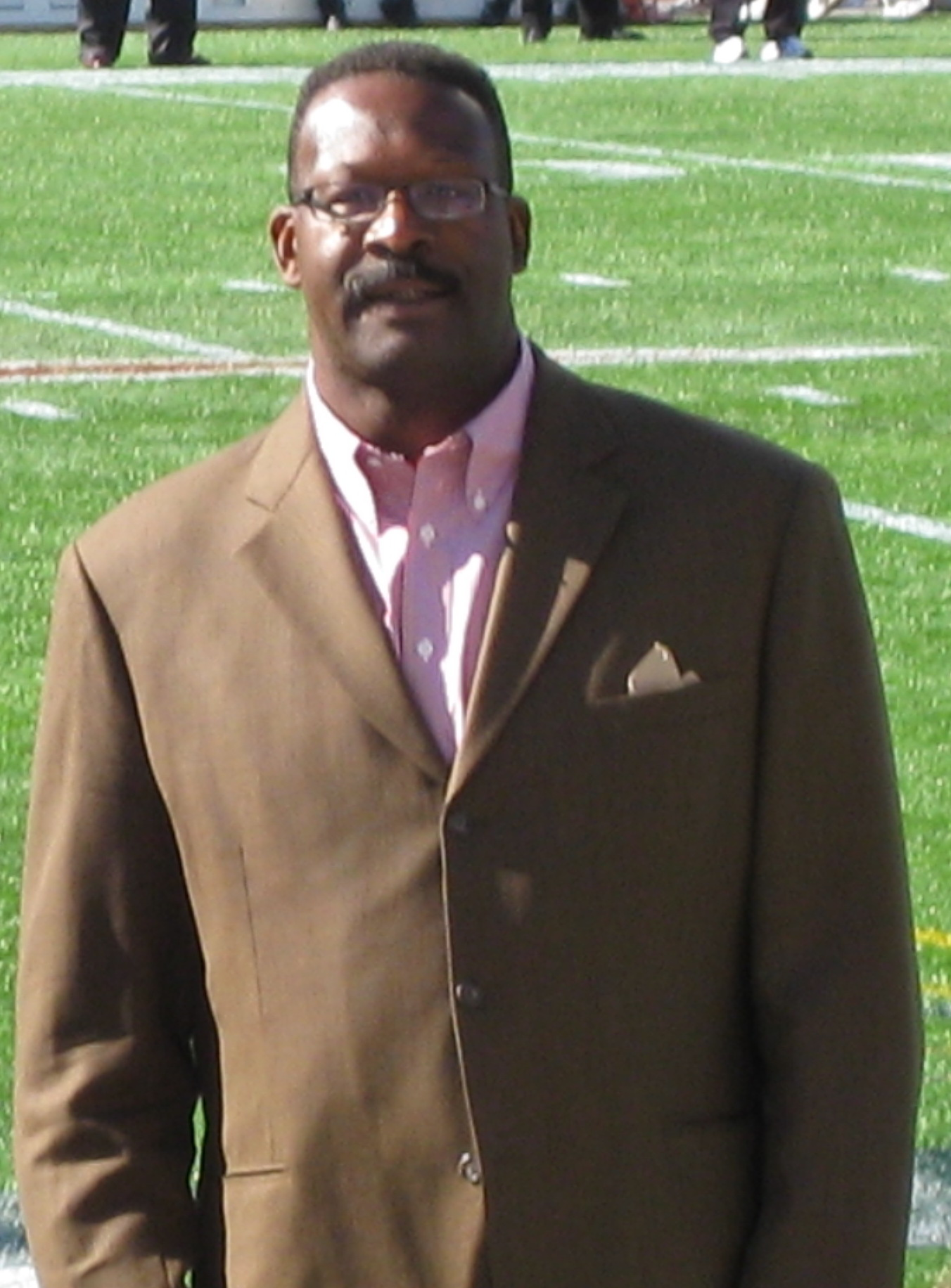
Andre Tippett

- Ken Bishop, professional football player
- Dale Carter, professional football player
- Rich Folkers, professional baseball player
- Joseph Gomer, Tuskegee Airman
- Mistral Raymond, professional football player
- Demetrius Rhaney, professional football player
- Andre Tippett, professional football player
- Tanner Varner, professional football player
- Jaleel Scott, professional football player
- Hernan Ramos, professional baseball player

== See also ==
- Homer D. Calkins
