= Garden City Broncbusters =

Athletic program of Garden City Community College

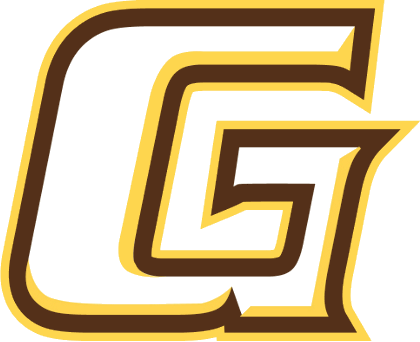
- University: Garden City Community College
- Nickname: Broncbusters
- Association: NJCAA
- Conference: KJCCC
- Athletic director: Mike Pilosof
- Location: Garden City, Kansas
- Varsity teams: 14
- Football stadium: Broncbuster Stadium
- Basketball arena: Dennis Perryman Athletic Complex
- Baseball stadium: Williams Stadium
- Softball stadium: Tangeman Sports Complex
- Soccer stadium: Broncbuster Stadium
- Colors: Brown, white, and gold
- Website: www.gobroncbusters.com

The Garden City Broncbusters are the sports teams of Garden City Community College located in Garden City, Kansas, United States. They participate in the NJCAA, primarily competing in the Kansas Jayhawk Community College Conference.

== Sports ==
Men's sports

- Baseball
- Basketball
- Cross country
- Football
- Golf
- Rodeo
- Track & field

Women's sports

- Basketball
- Cross country
- Rodeo
- Soccer
- Softball
- Track & field
- Volleyball

== Facilities ==
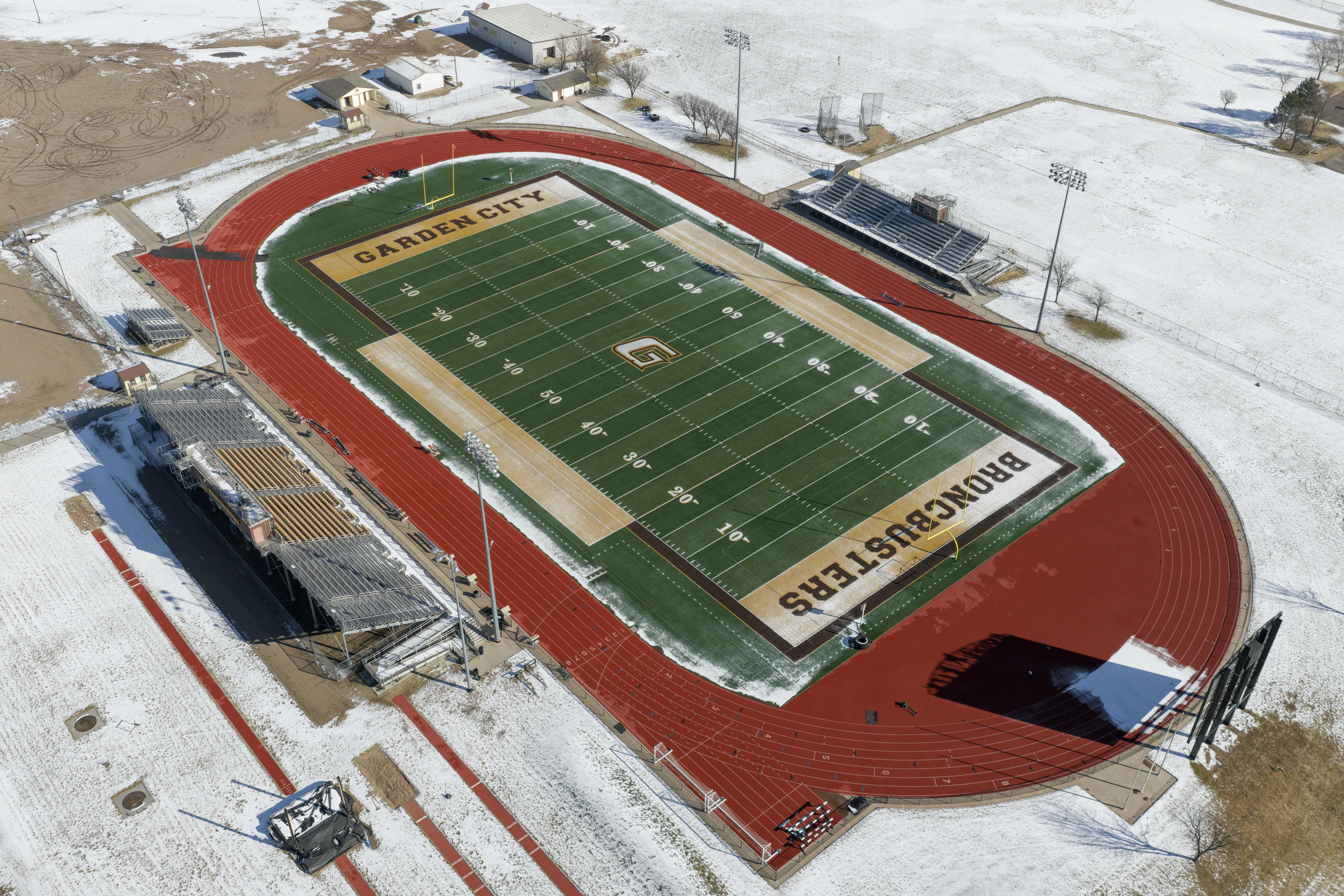
Broncbuster Stadium

Garden City Community College has five facilities.

- Broncbuster Baseball Academy – indoor baseball and softball practice facility
- Dennis Perryman Stadium – home of the Broncbusters men's and women's basketball teams, and volleyball team
- Broncbuster Stadium – home of the Broncbusters football, soccer and track & field teams
- Tangeman Sports Complex – home of the Broncbusters softball team
- Williams Stadium – home of the Broncbusters baseball team

== Notable alumni ==
- Amir Abdur-Rahim, former Head Coach, Kennesaw State Owls men's basketball
- Corey Dillon, former NFL player for the New England Patriots and Cincinnati Bengals; Super Bowl champion (XXXIX with New England), 4x Pro Bowl selection
- Mark Fox, Kentucky Wildcats men's basketball assistant coach; former head coach of the California Golden Bears (2019–2023), Georgia Bulldogs (2009–2018), and Nevada Wolf Pack (2004–2009); former assistant coach for the Nevada Wolf Pack (2000–2004), Kansas State Wildcats (1994–2000), and Washington Huskies (1991–1993); played basketball for the Eastern New Mexico Greyhounds from 1989–1991 after playing for Garden City from 1987–1989
- Benjamin Gay, former NFL player for the Cleveland Browns, Edmonton Eskimos and Indianapolis Colts
- Darrin Hancock, former National Basketball Association player; named to the National Junior College Athletic Association All-American team; National Player of the Year; later starred in the 1993 Final Four with the University of Kansas
- Kay-Jay Harris, former NFL player for the New York Giants, St. Louis Rams, and Miami Dolphins
- Tyreek Hill, NFL player for the Miami Dolphins; Super Bowl champion (LIV with the Kansas City Chiefs), has 6 All-Pro and 8 Pro Bowl selections
- Corey Jenkins, former NFL player for the Miami Dolphins and Chicago Bears
- C.J. Jones, former NFL player for several teams
- Denver Jones, basketball player in the Israeli Basketball Premier League
- Korey Jones, CFL player for the BC Lions
- Cameron Kenny, former NFL player for the Denver Broncos and San Diego Chargers
- Phil Loadholt, former NFL player for the Minnesota Vikings
- Frank Murphy, former NFL and UFL player; was named to the National Junior College Athletic Association All-American first-team; National Player of the Year
- Darvis Patton, "Doc"; retired sprinter in track and field; three-time Olympian (two silver medals); four-time participant at the World Championships (multiple medals, including two golds)
- Derrick Pope, former football player for the Minnesota Vikings and the Hamilton Tiger-Cats
- Tyler Rogers, MLB pitcher for the Toronto Blue Jays
- Tyson Thompson, former NFL player for the Dallas Cowboys
