= NJCAA National Football Championship =

American college football championships

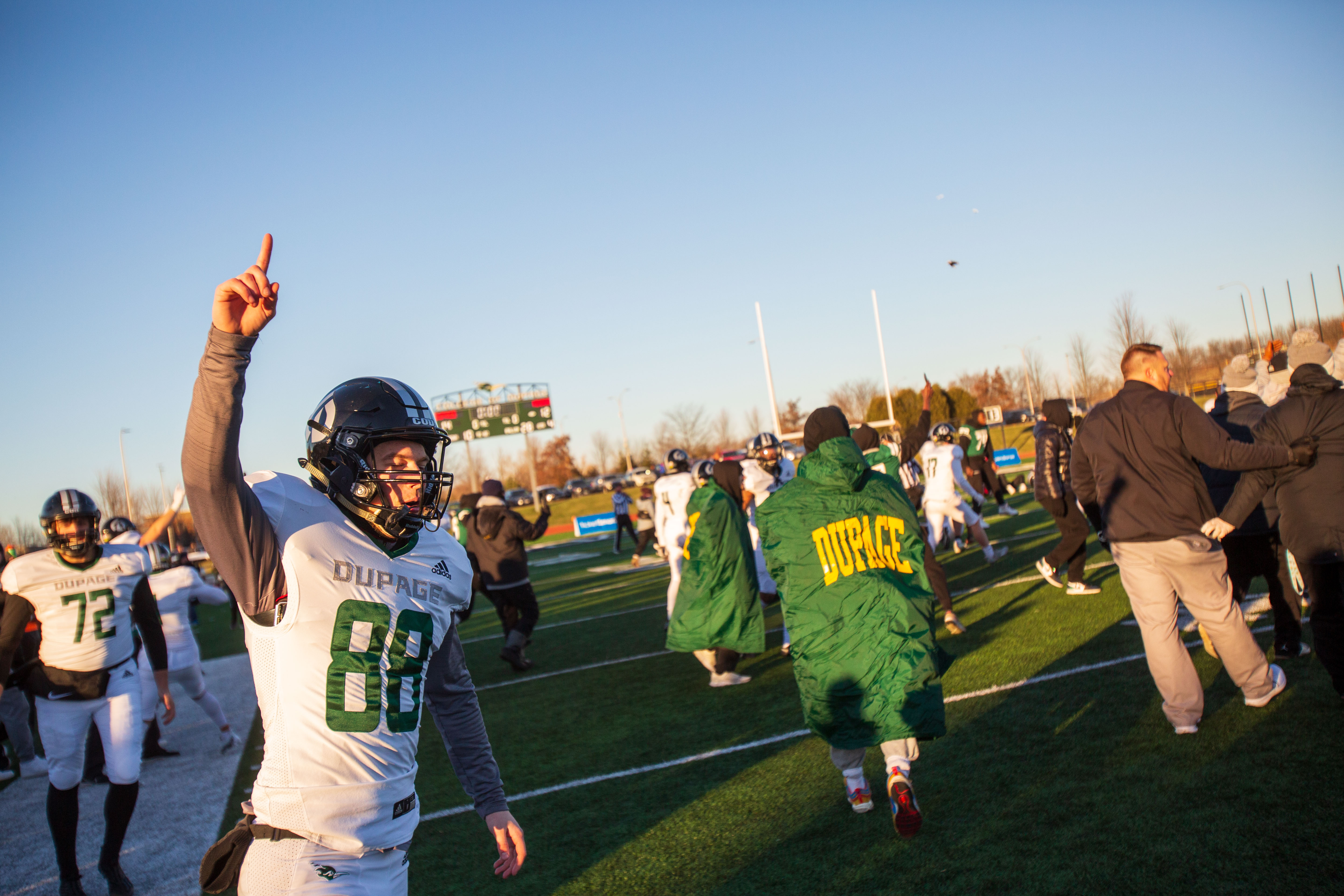
A photo at the conclusion of the 2022 Red Grange Bowl, the NJCAA Division III championship contest

National Junior College Athletic Association (NJCAA) national football champions:

== Champions ==
=== Single division era (1956–2021) ===
Year	Team	Location	Conference	Head coach
1956	Coffeyville	Coffeyville, Kansas	Kansas Jayhawk Community College Conference	Cliff Long
1957	Texarkana	Texarkana, Texas	Texas Junior College Conference	Duncan Thompson
1958	Boise	Boise, Idaho	Intermountain Collegiate Athletic Conference	Lyle Smith
1959	Northeastern Oklahoma A&M	Miami, Oklahoma	Oklahoma Junior College Conference	Red Robertson
1960 co-champions	Tyler; Cameron	Tyler, Texas; Lawton, Oklahoma	Texas Eastern Conference; Oklahoma Junior College Conference	Floyd Wagstaff; Leroy Montgomery
1961–1963 no champion
1964	Phoenix	Phoenix, Arizona	Arizona Junior College Athletic Conference	Thomas Hogan
1965	Ferrum	Ferrum, Virginia	Coastal Football Conference	Hank Norton
1966	Kilgore	Kilgore, Texas	Texas Junior College Football Federation	Boyd Converse
1967	Northeastern Oklahoma A&M	Miami, Oklahoma	Oklahoma Junior College Conference	Chuck Bowman
1968	Ferrum	Ferrum, Virginia	Coastal Football Conference	Hank Norton
1969	Northeastern Oklahoma A&M	Miami, Oklahoma	Independent	Chuck Bowman
1970	Fort Scott	Fort Scott, Kansas	Kansas Jayhawk Junior College Conference	Dick Foster
1971	Mississippi Gulf Coast	Perkinston, Mississippi	Mississippi Junior College Conference	George Sekul
1972	Arizona Western	Yuma, Arizona	Arizona Junior College Athletic Conference	Ray Butcher
1973	Mesa (AZ)	Mesa, Arizona	Arizona Community College Athletic Conference	Paul Widmer
1974	Ferrum	Ferrum, Virginia	Coastal Football Conference	Hank Norton
1975	Mesa (AZ)	Mesa, Arizona	Arizona Community College Athletic Conference	Paul Widmer
1976	Ellsworth	Iowa Falls, Iowa	Iowa Junior College Conference	Vern Thomsen
1977	Ferrum	Ferrum, Virginia	Coastal Football Conference	Hank Norton
1978	Iowa Central	Fort Dodge, Iowa	Iowa Junior College Conference	Paul Shupe
1979	Ranger	Ranger, Texas		Tim Marcum
1980	Northeastern Oklahoma A&M	Miami, Oklahoma	Southwest Junior College Football Conference	Glen Wolfe
1981	Butler County	El Dorado, Kansas	Kansas Jayhawk Community College Conference	Fayne Henson
1982	Northwest Mississippi	Senatobia, Mississippi	Mississippi Association of Community & Junior Colleges	Bobby Franklin
1983	Coffeyville	Coffeyville, Kansas	Kansas Jayhawk Community College Conference	Dick Foster
1984	Mississippi Gulf Coast	Perkinston, Mississippi	Mississippi Association of Community & Junior Colleges	George Sekul
1985	Snow	Ephraim, Utah	Western States Football League	Walt Criner
1986	Northeastern Oklahoma A&M	Miami, Oklahoma	Southwest Junior College Football Conference	Glen Wolfe
1987	Ellsworth	Iowa Falls, Iowa	Independent	Lloyd Sisco
1988	Glendale (AZ)	Glendale, Arizona	Western States Football League	Joe Kersting
1989	Navarro	Corsicana, Texas	Texas Junior College Football Conference	Bob McElroy
1990	Coffeyville	Coffeyville, Kansas	Kansas Jayhawk Community College Conference	Skip Foster
1991	Northeastern Oklahoma A&M	Miami, Oklahoma		Mike Loyd
1992	Northwest Mississippi	Senatobia, Mississippi	Mississippi Association of Community & Junior Colleges	Bobby Franklin
1993	Mississippi Delta	Moorhead, Mississippi	Mississippi Association of Community & Junior Colleges	James Gray
1994	Trinity Valley	Athens, Texas	Texas Junior College Football Conference	Randy Pippin
1995	Blinn	Brenham, Texas	Texas Junior College Football Conference	Willie Fritz
1996	Blinn	Brenham, Texas	Southwest Junior College Football Conference	Willie Fritz
1997	Trinity Valley	Athens, Texas	Southwest Junior College Football Conference	Scotty Conley
1998	Butler County	El Dorado, Kansas	Kansas Jayhawk Community College Conference	James Shibest
1999	Butler County	El Dorado, Kansas	Kansas Jayhawk Community College Conference	James Shibest
2000	Glendale (AZ)	Glendale, Arizona	Western States Football League	Mike Grossner
2001	Georgia Military	Milledgeville, Georgia	Independent	Bert Williams
2002	Joliet	Joliet, Illinois	North Central Community College Conference	Bob MacDougall
2003	Butler County	El Dorado, Kansas	Kansas Jayhawk Community College Conference	Troy Morrell
2004	Pearl River	Poplarville, Mississippi	Mississippi Association of Community & Junior Colleges	Tim Hatten
2005	Glendale (AZ)	Glendale, Arizona	Western States Football League	Joe Kersting
2006	Blinn	Brenham, Texas	Southwest Junior College Football Conference	Brad Franchione
2007 (co-champions)	Butler (KS); Mississippi Gulf Coast	El Dorado, Kansas; Perkinston, Mississippi	Kansas Jayhawk Community College Conference; Mississippi Association of Community & Junior Colleges	Troy Morrell; Steve Campbell
2008	Butler (KS)	El Dorado, Kansas	Kansas Jayhawk Community College Conference	Troy Morrell
2009	Blinn	Brenham, Texas	Southwest Junior College Football Conference	Brad Franchione
2010	Navarro	Corsicana, Texas	Southwest Junior College Football Conference	Nick Bobeck
2011	East Mississippi	Scooba, Mississippi	Mississippi Association of Community & Junior Colleges	Buddy Stephens
2012	Iowa Western	Council Bluffs, Iowa	Midwest Football Conference	Scott Strohmeier
2013	East Mississippi	Scooba, Mississippi	Mississippi Association of Community & Junior Colleges	Buddy Stephens
2014	East Mississippi	Scooba, Mississippi	Mississippi Association of Community & Junior Colleges	Buddy Stephens
2015	Northwest Mississippi	Senatobia, Mississippi	Mississippi Association of Community & Junior Colleges	Jack Wright
2016	Garden City	Garden City, Kansas	Kansas Jayhawk Community College Conference	Jeff Sims
2017	East Mississippi	Scooba, Mississippi	Mississippi Association of Community & Junior Colleges	Buddy Stephens
2018	East Mississippi	Scooba, Mississippi	Mississippi Association of Community & Junior Colleges	Buddy Stephens
2019	Mississippi Gulf Coast	Perkinston, Mississippi	Mississippi Association of Community & Junior Colleges	Jack Wright
2020–21 (Note: Due to COVID-19, the 2020 fall season was postponed until the spring of 2021 and is denoted in the record book as the 2020–21 season.)	Hutchinson	Hutchinson, Kansas	Kansas Jayhawk Community College Conference	Drew Dallas

=== Split division era (2021–present) ===
For the 2021 season, the NJCAA announced the creation of Division I and Division III, along with implementing a Division I national championship playoff system for the 2021 fall season. Prior to the fall of 2021, NJCAA Football consisted of a single division.

==== Division I ====
Year	Team	Location	Conference	Head coach
2021	New Mexico Military	Roswell, New Mexico	Southwest Junior College Football Conference	Kurt Taufa'asau
2022	Iowa Western	Council Bluffs, Iowa	Iowa Community College Athletic Conference	Scott Strohmeier
2023	Iowa Western	Council Bluffs, Iowa	Iowa Community College Athletic Conference	Scott Strohmeier
2024	Hutchinson	Hutchinson, Kansas	Kansas Jayhawk Community College Conference	Drew Dallas
2025	Iowa Western	Council Bluffs, Iowa	Iowa Community College Athletic Conference	Scott Strohmeier

==== Division III ====
Year	Team	Location	Conference	Head coach
2021	DuPage	Glen Ellyn, Illinois	Independent	Matt Rahn
2022	DuPage	Glen Ellyn, Illinois	Independent	Matt Rahn
2023	DuPage	Glen Ellyn, Illinois	Independent	Matt Rahn
2024	DuPage	Glen Ellyn, Illinois	Independent	Matt Rahn
2025	DuPage	Glen Ellyn, Illinois	Independent	Matt Rahn

=== J. C. Gridwire rankings (1960–1974) ===
Year	No. 1	No. 2	No. 3	No. 4	No. 5	Source
1960	Long Beach (10–0)	Hancock (10–0)	Bakersfield (9–1)	Del Mar (8–0–1)	Tyler (12–1)	
1961	Cameron (11–0), 788 points	Pearl River (10–0), 763 points	Bakersfield (9–1), 750 points	San Mateo (9–1), 746 points	Columbia Basin (9–0), 744 points	
1962	Santa Ana (10–0), 782.8 points Long Beach (9–0–1), 782.2 points		Orange Coast (9–1), 742 points	Henderson County (10–1–1), 737 points	Columbia Basin (8–1–1), 734 points	
1963	Orange Coast (10–0), 775 points	Bakersfield (9–1), 764 points	Pearl River (9–0–1), 752 points	Northeastern Oklahoma A&M (9–1), 748 points	Trinidad (8–2), 739 points	
1964	Long Beach (10–0), 790 points	Harbor (9–0), 754 points	Cameron (9–1), 750 points	Fullerton (8–2), 742 points	Jones County (9–1), 741 points Phoenix (10–1), 741 points	
1965	Fullerton (10–0), 784 points	Cerritos (10–0), 782 points	Henderson County (10–1), 754 points	Columbia Basin (9–0), 752 points	Monterey Peninsula (9–1), 743 points	
1966	Santa Monica (8–0–1), 768 points	Henderson County (10–1), 764 points	Laney (10–0), 764 points	Fullerton (9–0–1), 763 points	Kilgore (10–1), 759 points	
1967	Fullerton (12–0), 793 points	Bakersfield (9–1), 769 points	Northeastern Oklahoma A&M (9–1), 758 points	El Camino (8–1), 743 points	American River (11–1), 742 points	
1968	Jones County (MS) (9–0), 761 points	El Camino (10–1), 761 points	San Diego Junior College (9–1), 754 points	Bakersfield (8–1), 752 points	Ferrum (10–0), 751 points Fresno City (10–2), 751 points	
1969	Northeastern Oklahoma A&M (10–0)	Tyler (10–1)	Pasadena (8–0–1)	Pearl River (9–0)	Arizona Western (9–1)	
1970	Fort Scott (11–0), 764 points	Fullerton (11–1), 760 points	Redwoods (11–0), 758 points Sequoias (10–2), 758 points		Reedley [CA] (10–1), 749 points	
1971	Mississippi Gulf Coast (11–0), 783 points	El Camino (11–1), 782 points	Phoenix (9–1), 758 points	Arizona Western (9–1), 749 points	Fort Scott (10–1), 748 points	
1972	Arizona Western (10–0), 772 points	Pasadena (12–1), 763 points	Fresno City (11–1–1), 759 points	Blinn (9–0), 758 points	Redwoods (11–0), 754 points	
1973	Gavilan (11–0), 773 points			Navarro, 753 points		
1974	Pasadena (10–0–1)	Ferrum (10–0)	Grossmont (10–0–2)	East Los Angeles (9–1–2)	Mesa (AZ) (9–1)	

== Championship games ==
=== Single division (1956–2021) ===
Year	Bowl game	Winning team	Losing team	Score	References
1953	Junior Rose Bowl	Bakersfield (1)	Northeastern Oklahoma A&M	13–6	
1954	Junior Rose Bowl	Hinds (1)	El Camino	13–7	
1956	National Bowl	Coffeyville (1)	Grand Rapids	46–6	
1957		Texarkana (1)	Fairbury	56–0	
1958		Boise (1)	Tyler	22–0	
1959		Northeastern Oklahoma A&M (1)	Texarkana	10–7	
1964	Savannah Shrine Bowl	Phoenix (1)	Oklahoma Military	41–13	
1965	Savannah Shrine Bow	Ferrum (1)	McCook	16–0	
1966	Savannah Shrine Bowl	Kilgore (1)	Ferrum	28–7	
1967	Savannah Shrine Bowl	Northeastern Oklahoma A&M (2)	Lees–McRae	35–13	
1968		Ferrum (2)	Phoenix	41–19	
1969		Northeastern Oklahoma A&M (3)	Arizona Western	20–6	
1970		Fort Scott (1)	Mesa (AZ)	41–20	
1971		Mississippi Gulf Coast (1)	Fort Scott	22–13	
1972	El Toro Bowl	Arizona Western (1)	Fort Scott	36–8	
1973	El Toro Bowl	Mesa (AZ) (1)	Iowa Central	10–6	
1974		Ferrum (3)	Baltimore City	83–3	
1975	Wool Bowl	Mesa (AZ) (2)	Indian Hills	8–7	
1976	Junior Rose Bowl	Bakersfield (2)	Ellsworth	29–14	
1989	Mid-America Bowl	Navarro (1)	Ellsworth	41–17	
1990	Mid-America Bowl	Coffeyville (2)	Montgomery (MD)	58–20	
1991	Mid-America Bowl	Northeastern Oklahoma A&M (4)	Northwest Mississippi	49–21	
1992	Mid-America Bowl	Northwest Mississippi (1)	Northeastern Oklahoma A&M	34–0	
1993		Mississippi Delta (1)	Nassau	20–16	
1994	Texas Juco Shrine Bowl	Trinity Valley (1)	Northeastern Oklahoma A&M	24–17	
1997	Red River Bowl	Trinity Valley (2)	Garden City	48–13	
2005	Valley of the Sun Bowl	Glendale (CA) (1)	Grand Rapids	50–48	
2006	Pilgrim's Pride Bowl Classic	Blinn (1)	Pearl River	19–6	
2007	Top of the Mountains Bowl; Heart of Texas Bowl	Butler (KS) (1); Mississippi Gulf Coast (2)	Snow; Kilgore	56–27; 62–28	
2008	Top of the Mountains Bowl	Butler (KS) (2)	Snow	37–30^{2OT}	
2009	Citizens Bank Bowl	Blinn (2)	Fort Scott	31–26	
2010	Citizens Bank Bowl	Navarro (2)	Butler (KS)	13–12	
2011	El Toro Bowl	East Mississippi (1)	Arizona Western	55–47	
2012	Graphic Edge Bowl	Iowa Western (1)	Butler (KS)	27–7	
2013	Mississippi Bowl	East Mississippi (2)	Georgia Military	52–32	
2014	Mississippi Bowl	East Mississippi (3)	Iowa Western	34–17	
2015	Mississippi Bowl	Northwest Mississippi (2)	Rochester C&T	66–13	
2016	El Toro Bowl	Garden City (1)	Arizona Western	25–22	
2017	Mississippi Bowl	East Mississippi (4)	Arizona Western	31–28	
2018		East Mississippi (5)	Garden City	10–9	
2019		Mississippi Gulf Coast (3)	Lackawanna	24–13	
2020–21 (Note: Due to COVID-19, the 2020 fall season was postponed until the spring of 2021 and is denoted in the record book as the 2020–21 season.)		Hutchinson (1)	Snow	29–27	

=== Division I (2021–present) ===
Year	Bowl game	Winning team	Losing team	Score
2021		New Mexico Military (1)	Iowa Western	31–13
2022		Iowa Western (2)	Hutchinson	31–0
2023		Iowa Western (4)	East Mississippi	61–14
2024		Hutchinson (2)	Iowa Western	28–23
2025		Iowa Western (5)	Hutchinson	28–10

=== Division III (2021–present) ===
Year	Bowl game	Winning team	Losing team	Score
2021	Red Grange Bowl	DuPage (1)	Nassau	34–29
2022	Red Grange Bowl	DuPage (2)	NDSCS	14–12
2023	Red Grange Bowl	DuPage (3)	Rochester C&T	33–29
2024	Red Grange Bowl	DuPage (4)	Louisburg	31–14
2025	Red Grange Bowl	DuPage (5)	NDSCS	36–13

=== Top non-scholarship (2000–2010) ===
From 2000 to 2010, the NJCAA recognized the top non-scholarship team in the nation.

Year	Champion	Record	Head coach
2000	Rochester C&T	12–0	Chuck Siefert
2001	Joliet	10–1	Bob MacDougall
2002	Joliet	11–0	Bob MacDougall
2003	Harper	10–1	John Eliasik
2004	Harper	9–2	John Eliasik
2005	Grand Rapids	9–2	Jim Schulte
2006	Vermilion	10–2	Steve Crittenden
2007	Rochester C&T	11–0	Brad LaPlante
2008	Harper	11–1	Dragan Teonic
2009	Grand Rapids	9–2	Tony Annese
2010	Nassau	11–0	Jermaine Miles

== National championships by team ==
Wins	College
6	Butler County / Butler (KS) (1981, 1998, 1999, 2003, 2007†, 2008)
6	Northeastern Oklahoma A&M (1959, 1967, 1969, 1980, 1986, 1991)
5	East Mississippi (2011, 2013, 2014, 2017, 2018)
4	Blinn (1995, 1996, 2006, 2009)
4	Ferrum (1965, 1968, 1974, 1977)
4	Iowa Western (2012, 2022, 2023, 2025)
4	Mississippi Gulf Coast (1971, 1984, 2007†, 2019)
3	Coffeyville (1956, 1983, 1990)
3	Glendale (AZ) (1988, 2000, 2005)
3	Northwest Mississippi (1982, 1992, 2015)
2	Bakersfield (1953, 1976)
2	Hutchinson (KS) (2020, 2024)
2	Mesa (AZ) (1973, 1975)
2	Navarro (1989, 2010)
2	Trinity Valley (1994, 1997)
1	Arizona Western (1972)
1	Boise (1958)
1	Cameron (1960†)
1	Ellsworth (1976)
1	Fort Scott (1970)
1	Garden City (2016)
1	Georgia Military (2001)
1	Hinds (1954)
1	Iowa Central (1978)
1	Joliet (2002)
1	Kilgore (1966)
1	Mississippi Delta (1993)
1	New Mexico Military (2021)
1	Paris (?)
1	Pearl River (2004)
1	Phoenix (1964)
1	Ranger (1979)
1	Snow (1985)
1	Texarkana (1957)
1	Tyler (1960†)

† Co-champions
