= 1972 Arizona Western Matadors football team =

American college football season

1972 Arizona Western Matadors football

NJCAA champion AJCAC champion El Toro Bowl champion

El Toro Bowl, W 36–8 vs. Fort Scott
- Conference: Arizona Junior College Athletic Conference
- Record: 10–0 (4–0 AJCAC)
- Head coach: Ray Butcher (5th season)

1972 Arizona Junior College Athletic Conference football standings
	Conf.					Overall
Team	W		L		T	W		L		T
Arizona Western $	4	–	0	–	0	10	–	0	–	0
Phoenix	3	–	1	–	0	7	–	1	–	1
Mesa (AZ)	2	–	2	–	0	8	–	2	–	0
Eastern Arizona	1	–	3	–	0	4	–	5	–	0
Glendale (AZ)	0	–	4	–	0	1	–	8	–	0
$ – Conference champion

The 1972 Arizona Western Matadors football team was an American football team that represented Arizona Western College as a member of the Arizona Junior College Athletic Conference (AJCAC) during the 1972 junior college football season. In their fifth year under head coach Ray Butcher, the team compiled a perfect 10–0 record, won the NJCAA National Football Championship, and defeated Fort Scott in the El Toro Bowl.

Arizona placed nine players on the 1972 AJCAC all-conference football team. Five players were honored on the offensive unit: running back Larry Bates; tight end Brian Adam; guards Bill Moody and John Segreti and tackle Steve Garcia. Four from the defensive unit were also honored: defensive end Charles Haynes; defensive tackle John Trujillo; linebacker Ron Davis and defensive back Reggie Pierson. Butcher was also named AJCC coach of the year.

== Schedule ==
Date	Opponent	Site	Result	Source
September 9	Eastern Arizona*	Yuma, AZ	W 20–8	
September 16	at New Mexico Military*	Roswell, NM	W 41–14	
September 23	San Diego Mesa*		W 26–13	
September 30	at Eastern Arizona	Thatcher, AZ	W 28–23	
October 7	Mesa (AZ)	Yuma, AZ	W 19–14	
October 21	Air Force junior varsity*		W 47–27	
October 28	Phoenix	Yuma, AZ	W 24–0	
November 3	Glendale (AZ)		W 28–6	
November 11	Grossmont*	Yuma, AZ	W 18–6	
November 25	Fort Scott*	Yuma, AZ (El Toro Bowl)	W 36–8	
*Non-conference game
