= Paul Widmer =

American football coach (1937–2017)

Joe Kersting
Biographical details
- Born: August 21, 1937; Natrona Heights, Pennsylvania, U.S.
- Died: October 9, 2017 (aged 80); Mesa, Arizona, U.S.

Playing career
- 1955–1958: Arizona State
- Position: Tackle

Coaching career (HC unless noted)
- 1959: Camelback HS (AZ) (assistant)
- 1960–1963: Tempe HS (AZ) (assistant)
- 1964–1966: Tempe HS (AZ)
- 1967–1969: Mesa (AZ) (assistant)
- 1970–1980: Mesa (AZ)

Head coaching record
- Overall: 86–19–3 (junior college)
- Bowls: 3–1 (junior college)

Accomplishments and honors

Championships
- 2 NJCAA National (1973, 1975); 5 AJCAC/ACCAC (1970, 1973–1976)

Paul Francis Widmer Jr. (August 21, 1937 – October 9, 2017) was an American football coach. He served at the head football coach at Mesa Community College in Mesa, Arizona from 1970 to 1980, compiling a record of 86–19–3, and leading his team to two NJCAA National Football Championships, in 1973 and 1975.

Widmer played college football at Arizona State University from 1955 to 1958 under head coach Dan Devine and Frank Kush. He began his coaching career in 1959 as an assistant at Camelback High School in Phoenix, Arizona. The following year, he moved to Tempe High School in Tempe, Arizona, where he was an assistant coach for four years before being promoted to head football coach. Widmer joined the coaching staff of the newly opened Mesa Community College as an assistant in 1967 under head coach Mutt Ford. He succeeded Ford as head coach in 1970. Widmer resigned from his post at Mesa after the 1980 season and was succeeded by assistant coach, Allen Benedict.

Widmer died on October 9, 2017, in Mesa.

== Head coaching record ==
=== Junior college ===
Year	Team	Overall	Conference	Standing	Bowl/playoffs
Mesa Hokams/Thunderbirds (Arizona Junior College Athletic Conference / Arizona Community College Athletic Conference) (1970–1980)
1970	Mesa	10–1	4–0	1st	L Shrine Bowl
1971	Mesa	7–2	2–2	3rd	
1972	Mesa	8–2	2–2	3rd	
1973	Mesa	10–0	5–0	1st	W El Toro Bowl
1974	Mesa	9–1	4–1	1st	W Wool Bowl
1975	Mesa	9–0	5–0	1st	
1976	Mesa	9–1–1	4–0–1	1st	W Wool Bowl
1977	Mesa	7–1–1	4–1	2nd	
1978	Mesa	7–3	3–2	3rd	
1979	Mesa	7–3	3–2	T–2nd	
1980	Mesa	3–5–1	2–3	4th	
Mesa:		86–19–3	38–13–1		
Total:		86–19–3			
National championship Conference title Conference division title or championship game berth
