= 2025 junior college football season =

American junior college football season

- National Championship: Red Grange Bowl, Glen Ellyn, IL, (NJCAA D-III)
- Champion(s): Iowa Western (NJCAA D-I); DuPage (NJCAA D-III); San Mateo (3C2A)

The 2025 junior college football season was the season of intercollegiate junior college football running from September to December 2025. The season ended with three national champions: one from the National Junior College Athletic Association's (NJCAA) Division I and Division III, respectively, and one from the California Community College Athletic Association (3C2A).

The NJCAA Division I champion was Iowa Western, which defeated Hutchinson, 28–10, in the NJCAA National Football Championship. The NJCAA Division III champion was DuPage, which beat NDSCS, 36–13, in the Red Grange Bowl. The 3C2A champion was San Mateo, which bested Golden West, 28–27, in the 3C2A State Championship.

== Conference standings ==
=== NJCAA Division I ===
2025 Georgia Collegiate Athletic Association football standings
	Conf.			Overall
Team	W		L	W		L
No. 5 Georgia Military $	3	–	0	10	–	1
Andrew	1	–	1	8	–	1
Central Georgia Tech	0	–	3	7	–	4
$ – Conference champion; Rankings from NJCAA Division I poll

2025 Iowa Community College Athletic Conference football standings
	Conf.			Overall
Team	W		L	W		L
No. 1 Iowa Western $^	2	–	0	12	–	1
No. 9 Iowa Central	1	–	1	8	–	4
Ellsworth	0	–	2	3	–	7
$ – Conference champion; ^ – NJCAA Division I playoff participant; Rankings from NJCAA Division I poll

2025 Kansas Jayhawk Community College Conference football standings
	Conf.			Overall
Team	W		L	W		L
No. 2 Hutchinson $^	6	–	0	11	–	1
No. 7 Coffeyville	5	–	1	7	–	3
No. 10 Butler (KS)	4	–	2	7	–	3
No. 15 Garden City	3	–	3	6	–	5
Independence	2	–	4	4	–	7
Dodge City	1	–	5	1	–	9
Highland (KS)	0	–	6	0	–	11
$ – Conference champion; ^ – NJCAA Division I playoff participant; Rankings from NJCAA Division I poll

2025 Mississippi Association of Community Colleges Conference football standings
	Conf.			Overall
Team	W		L	W		L
North Division
No. 4 Northwest Mississippi x†y$^	5	–	1	10	–	2
No. 12 East Mississippi x†	5	–	1	7	–	3
Itawamba	4	–	2	5	–	4
Northeast Mississippi	3	–	3	5	–	4
Holmes	3	–	3	3	–	6
Coahoma	1	–	5	1	–	8
Mississippi Delta	0	–	6	0	–	9
South Division
No. 6 Mississippi Gulf Coast x†y	5	–	1	9	–	2
No. 8 Copiah–Lincoln x†	5	–	1	8	–	2
No. 14 Hinds	4	–	2	6	–	3
East Central (MS)	3	–	3	3	–	6
Jones (MS)	2	–	4	5	–	4
Southwest Mississippi	2	–	4	3	–	6
Pearl River	0	–	6	1	–	8
Championship: Northwest Mississippi 16, Mississippi Gulf Coast 13
$ – Conference champion; x – Division champion/co-champions; † – Conference playoff participant; y – Championship game participant; ^ – NJCAA Division I playoff participant; Rankings from NJCAA Division I poll

2025 Northeast Football Conference standings
	Conf.			Overall
Team	W		L	W		L
Monroe +	1	–	1	5	–	4
Lackawanna +	1	–	1	4	–	6
+ – Conference co-champions

2025 Southwest Junior College Football Conference standings
	Conf.			Overall
Team	W		L	W		L
No. 3 Tyler †y$^	7	–	0	11	–	1
No. 13 Northeastern Oklahoma A&M †y	6	–	2	6	–	5
No. 11 Trinity Valley †	5	–	3	7	–	3
Cisco †	4	–	3	5	–	4
Blinn	2	–	5	4	–	5
New Mexico Military	2	–	5	3	–	6
Navarro	2	–	5	2	–	6
Kilgore	1	–	6	3	–	6
Championship: Tyler 33, Northeastern Oklahoma A&M 14
$ – Conference champion; † – Conference playoff participant; y – Championship game participant; ^ – NJCAA Division I playoff participant; Rankings from NJCAA Division I poll

2025 NJCAA Division I independents football records
	Conf.			Overall
Team	W	L	T	W		L		T
Snow		–			6	–	5
Community Christian (CA)		–			5	–	6
Community Christian (MI)		–			2	–	7

=== NJCAA Division III ===
2025 Minnesota College Athletic Conference football standings
	Conf.			Overall
Team	W		L	W		L
No. 3 Rochester C&T †y	6	–	0	8	–	2
No. 2 NDSCS †y$^	5	–	1	10	–	2
Minnesota West C&T †	5	–	2	5	–	4
Central Lakes †	3	–	4	3	–	7
Minnesota State C&T †	2	–	5	2	–	6
Mesabi Range †	1	–	5	1	–	5
Vermilion †	0	–	5	0	–	6
Championship: NDSCS 37, Rochester C&T 29
$ – Conference champion; † – Conference playoff participant; y – Championship game participant; ^ – Red Grange Bowl participant; Rankings from NJCAA Division III poll

2025 NJCAA Division III independents football records
	Conf.			Overall
Team	W		L	W		L
No. 4 Erie		–		9	–	1
No. 1 DuPage ^		–		8	–	2
Hudson Valley		–		7	–	3
No. 5 Louisburg		–		6	–	4
Nassau		–		3	–	6
Hocking		–		2	–	7
^ – Red Grange Bowl participant; Rankings from NJCAA Division III poll

=== 3C2A ===
==== SCFA ====
2025 American Metro League standings
	Conf.			Overall
Team	W		L	W		L
Victor Valley $	5	–	0	10	–	1
Antelope Valley	4	–	1	10	–	1
Desert	3	–	2	4	–	6
Los Angeles Valley	2	–	3	3	–	7
Los Angeles Southwest	1	–	4	2	–	8
Compton	0	–	5	0	–	10
$ – Conference champion

2025 American Pacific League standings
	Conf.			Overall
Team	W		L	W		L
Santa Monica +	4	–	1	8	–	3
San Bernardino Valley +	4	–	1	7	–	3
West Los Angeles	3	–	2	7	–	4
Grossmont	2	–	3	7	–	4
Glendale (CA)	2	–	3	5	–	5
Pierce	0	–	5	0	–	10
+ – Conference co-champions

2025 National Central League standings
	Conf.			Overall
Team	W		L	W		L
Golden West $^	7	–	0	12	–	1
Cerritos ^	6	–	1	8	–	3
Fullerton	5	–	2	8	–	3
College of the Canyons	4	–	3	4	–	6
Pasadena City	3	–	4	6	–	5
Bakersfield	2	–	5	4	–	6
East Los Angeles	1	–	6	2	–	8
Orange Coast	0	–	7	0	–	10
$ – Conference champion; ^ – 3C2A playoff participant

2025 National Northern League standings
	Conf.			Overall
Team	W		L	W		L
Mt. San Antonio +^	6	–	1	10	–	2
Ventura +^	6	–	1	10	–	2
Moorpark	5	–	2	6	–	5
Citrus	4	–	3	6	–	5
Allan Hancock	3	–	4	4	–	6
Long Beach City	3	–	4	3	–	7
Santa Ana	1	–	6	1	–	9
Santa Barbara City	0	–	7	0	–	10
+ – Conference co-champions; ^ – 3C2A playoff participant

2025 National Southern League standings
	Conf.			Overall
Team	W		L	W		L
Saddleback $^	7	–	0	10	–	2
El Camino ^	6	–	1	8	–	3
Riverside City	5	–	2	7	–	4
Southwestern (CA)	4	–	3	8	–	3
San Diego Mesa	3	–	4	8	–	3
Palomar	2	–	5	3	–	7
Mt. San Jacinto	1	–	6	3	–	7
Chaffey	0	–	7	1	–	9
$ – Conference champion; ^ – 3C2A playoff participant

==== NCFC ====
2025 American Golden Coast League standings
	Conf.			Overall
Team	W		L	W		L
De Anza $	5	–	0	10	–	1
Coalinga	4	–	1	7	–	4
Merced	3	–	2	5	–	5
Hartnell	2	–	3	4	–	6
Cabrillo	1	–	4	2	–	8
Gavilan	0	–	5	1	–	9
$ – Conference champion

2025 American Pacific 7 League standings
	Conf.			Overall
Team	W		L	W		L
Feather River $	5	–	0	10	–	1
Los Medanos	4	–	1	10	–	1
College of the Siskiyous	3	–	2	7	–	4
San Joaquin Delta	2	–	3	5	–	6
Contra Costa	1	–	4	1	–	9
Chabot	0	–	5	1	–	9
$ – Conference champion

2025 National Bay 6 League standings
	Conf.			Overall
Team	W		L	W		L
San Mateo +^	4	–	1	12	–	1
Diablo Valley +^	4	–	1	10	–	2
CC of San Francisco +^	4	–	1	7	–	4
Foothill	2	–	3	6	–	5
Laney	1	–	4	2	–	8
San Jose City	0	–	5	1	–	9
+ – Conference co-champions; ^ – 3C2A playoff participant

2025 National Norcal League standings
	Conf.			Overall
Team	W		L	W		L
Butte +^	4	–	1	8	–	3
American River +	4	–	1	5	–	6
Sierra	3	–	2	4	–	6
College of the Redwoods	3	–	2	3	–	7
Shasta	1	–	4	1	–	9
Santa Rosa	0	–	5	3	–	7
+ – Conference co-champions; ^ – 3C2A playoff participant

2025 National Valley League standings
	Conf.			Overall
Team	W		L	W		L
Modesto $^	5	–	0	9	–	3
Fresno City ^	4	–	1	7	–	5
College of the Sequoias	3	–	2	7	–	4
Monterey Peninsula	2	–	3	7	–	4
Sacramento City	1	–	4	4	–	6
Reedley	0	–	5	2	–	8
$ – Conference champion; ^ – 3C2A playoff participant

== Postseason ==
=== Playoffs ===
The NJCAA announced the schedules for the Division I and Division III playoffs on November 17, 2025, and announced the teams and matchups on November 24, 2025. This is the second consecutive season the NJCAA Division I championship was held at West Texas A&M University's Bain–Schaeffer Buffalo Stadium, after previously being held at Catholic High School for Boys' War Memorial Stadium in Little Rock, Arkansas.

==== NJCAA Division I ====
Semifinals; December 5/6; Campus sites
1	Hutchinson	27
4	Northwest Mississippi	0
3	Tyler	29
2	Iowa Western	41

Championship game December 17; Bain–Schaeffer Buffalo Stadium—Canyon, TX
1	Hutchinson	10
2	Iowa Western	28

==== Red Grange Bowl ====
Championship game December 6 Bjarne Ullsvik Stadium—Glen Ellyn, IL
1	DuPage	36
2	NDSCS	13

== See also ==
- 2025 NCAA Division I FBS football season
- 2025 NCAA Division I FCS football season
- 2025 NCAA Division II football season
- 2025 NCAA Division III football season
- 2025 NAIA football season
- 2025 U Sports football season
