= Mike Grossner =

American football coach

Current position
- Title: Head coach
- Team: Bethany (KS)
- Conference: KCAC
- Record: 7–26

Playing career
- 1985: Northern Arizona
- 1986: Scottsdale
- 1987–1988: Bethany (KS)
- 1990–1992: Nottingham Hoods
- 1993: Chiefs Ravenna
- Position: Quarterback

Coaching career (HC unless noted)
- 1990–1995: Glendale (AZ) (OC)
- 1992: Nottingham Hoods (co-HC)
- 1996: Agua Fria HS (AZ)
- 1997–2000: Glendale (AZ)
- 2001–2003: Western State (CO) (AHC/RC)
- 2004–2018: Baker
- 2019–2022: Leicester Falcons
- 2023–present: Bethany (KS)

Head coaching record
- Overall: 124–81 (college); 27–16 (junior college); 8–4 (high school)
- Bowls: 2–1 (junior college)
- Tournaments: 6–7 (NAIA playoffs)

Accomplishments and honors

Championships
- 1 NJCAA National (2000); 1 WSFL (2000); 1 HAAC (2013); 4 HAAC South Division (2015–2018)

Mike Grossner is an American football coach and former player. He is the head football coach for Bethany College, a position he has held since 2023. Grossner served as the head football coach at Baker University in Baldwin City, Kansas from 2004 to 2018. At Baker, he led the Wildcats to their 500th and 600th all-time victories, building the program to No. 2 in all-time National Association of Intercollegiate Athletics (NAIA) wins. Grossner was the head football coach at Glendale Community College in Glendale, Arizona from 1997 to 2000. He led his 2000 team to a NJCAA National Football Championship.

Grossner played college football at Bethany and four seasons professionally in the BAFA National Leagues and the Italian Football League from 1990 to 1993. He was the head football coach at Agua Fria High School in Avondale, Arizona for one season, in 1996. He led the Agua Fria Owls to a record of 8–4 and a playoff appearance in his lone season there and was named Class 4A Coach of the Year. In early 1997, he succeeded Joe Kersting as head football coach at Glendale.

== Head coaching record ==
=== College ===
Year	Team	Overall	Conference	Standing	Bowl/playoffs	NAIA^{#}
Baker Wildcats (Heart of America Athletic Conference) (2004–2018)
2004	Baker	4–6	4–6	T–6th		
2005	Baker	3–8	3–7	T–8th		
2006	Baker	4–6	4–6	T–7th		
2007	Baker	6–5	6–4	T–4th		
2008	Baker	8–4	8–2	3rd	L NAIA First Round	12
2009	Baker	7–3	7–3	4th		24
2010	Baker	7–4	7–3	4th		24
2011	Baker	7–3	6–3	4th		21
2012	Baker	8–3	7–2	3rd	L NAIA First Round	14
2013	Baker	11–2	8–1	T–1st	L NAIA Quarterfinal	5
2014	Baker	8–3	6–3	T–3rd		16
2015	Baker	11–2	10–1	1st (South)	L NAIA Quarterfinal	5
2016	Baker	14–1	11–0	1st (South)	L NAIA Championship	2
2017	Baker	10–2	4–1	T–1st (South)	L NAIA First Round	9
2018	Baker	9–3	4–0	1st (South)	L NAIA Quarterfinal	5
Baker:		117–55	95–42			
Bethany Swedes (Kansas Collegiate Athletic Conference) (2023–present)
2023	Bethany	1–10	0–5	6th (Kissinger)		
2024	Bethany	3–8	0–5	6th (Kissinger)		
2025	Bethany	3–8	1–4	T–4th (Kissinger)		
2026	Bethany	0–0	0–0	(Kissinger)		
Bethany:		7–26	1–14			
Total:		124–81				
National championship Conference title Conference division title or championship game berth
^{#}Rankings from final NAIA Coaches' Poll.

=== Junior college ===
Year	Team	Overall	Conference	Standing	Bowl/playoffs
Glendale Gauchos (Western States Football League) (1997–2000)
1997	Glendale	7–4	4–4	5th	W Valley of the Sun Bowl
1998	Glendale	5–5	3–5	6th	
1999	Glendale	5–6	3–4	5th	L Valley of the Sun Bowl
2000	Glendale	10–1	7–1	1st	W Valley of the Sun Bowl
Glendale:		27–16	17–14		
Total:		27–16			
National championship Conference title Conference division title or championship game berth
