= Paul Shupe =

American football coach, athletics administrator (1932–2007)

Biographical details
- Born: May 31, 1932; Lacona, Iowa, U.S.
- Died: August 17, 2007 (aged 75); Fort Dodge, Iowa, U.S.

Playing career

Football
- 1951–1952: Iowa State
- 1956: Iowa State
- Position: Halfback

Coaching career (HC unless noted)

Football
- 1967–1989: Iowa Central

Administrative career (AD unless noted)
- ?–1990: Iowa Central

Head coaching record
- Overall: 155–62–4 (junior college football)
- Bowls: 3–7–1 (junior college)

Accomplishments and honors

Championships
- 1 NJCAA National (1978); 1 Tri-State Junior (1967); 8 Iowa Juco (1969, 1972–1973, 1978, 1980, 1982, 1985–1986)

Paul Ray Shupe (May 31, 1932 – August 17, 2007) was an American football coach and athletics administrator. He served as the head football coach at Iowa Central Community College in Fort Dodge, Iowa from 1967 to 1989, compiling a 155–62–4 in 23 seasons. Shupe led his 1978 Iowa Central team to a NJCAA National Football Championship.

Shupe attended Chariton High School in Chariton, Iowa before going to Iowa State College of Agriculture and Mechanic Arts—now known as Iowa State University. After playing as a halfback for the Iowa State Cyclones football team in 1951 and 1952, he served in the United States Army Signal Corps. Shupe returned to Iowa State in 1956.

Before going to Iowa Central in 1967, Shupe coached the sophomore football team at Webster City High School in Webster City, Iowa and basketball at Webster City Junior College. He died on August 17, 2007.

== Head coaching record ==
=== Junior college football ===
Year	Team	Overall	Conference	Standing	Bowl/playoffs
Iowa Central Panthers (Tri-State Junior College Conference) (1967–1968)
1967	Iowa Central	7–1	6–1	T–1st	
1968	Iowa Central		3–2	3rd	
Iowa Central Panthers (Iowa Junior College Conference) (1969–1973)
1969	Iowa Central	8–1–1	4–0–1	1st	L Wool Bowl
1970	Iowa Central	5–3–1	3–1–1	T–2nd	
1971	Iowa Central	4–5	3–3	4th	
1972	Iowa Central	8–0–2	6–0	1st	T Mid-America Bowl
1973	Iowa Central	9–1	5–0	1st	L El Toro Bowl
Iowa Central Panthers (Independent) (1974)
1974	Iowa Central	8–1			
Iowa Central Panthers/Tritons (Iowa Junior College Conference) (1975–1989)
1975	Iowa Central	4–5	4–3	3rd	
1976	Iowa Central	6–3	5–3	2nd	
1977	Iowa Central	4–6	4–5	4th	
1978	Iowa Central	10–1	8–0	1st	L Coca-Cola Bowl
1979	Iowa Central	8–2			
1980	Iowa Central	9–1	7–1	1st	W Coca-Cola Bowl
1981	Iowa Central	4–5	3–3	3rd	
1982	Iowa Central	7–3	5–1	1st	L RC Cola Bowl
1983	Iowa Central	7–2	4–2	2nd	
1984	Iowa Central	8–2	3–1	2nd	L Like Cola Bowl
1985	Iowa Central	9–1	5–1	1st	W Like Cola Bowl
1986	Iowa Central	9–2	4–0	1st	L RC Cola Bowl
1987	Iowa Central	3–4	1–3	T–4th	
1988	Iowa Central	5–4	3–1	2nd	W RC Cola Bowl
1989	Iowa Central	6–5	3–2	T–2nd	L RC Cola Bowl
Iowa Central:		155–62–4			
Total:		155–62–4			
National championship Conference title Conference division title or championship game berth
