= Mike Loyd =

American football player and coach (born 1956)

No. 10, 14
- Position: Quarterback

Personal information
- Born: May 6, 1956 (age 70); Joplin, Missouri, U.S.
- Listed height: 6 ft 2 in (1.88 m)
- Listed weight: 216 lb (98 kg)

Career information
- High school: Memorial (Joplin)
- College: Missouri Southern State; Tulsa; Kansas
- NFL draft: 1979: undrafted

Career history

Playing
- St. Louis Cardinals (1979–1980); Oklahoma Outlaws (1984)

Coaching
- Vero Beach (FL) (1982–1983) Quarterback coach; Tulsa Memorial HS (OK) (1984) Assistant; Tulsa Memorial HS (OK) (1987–1988) Head coach; Lake Worth HS (FL) (1989) Head coach; Northeastern Oklahoma A&M (1990) Offensive coordinator; Northeastern Oklahoma A&M (1991–1995) Head coach; Joplin HS (MO) (1996–1997) Head coach; McAlester HS (OK) (1998–1999) Head coach; Ardmore HS (OK) (2000–2007) Head coach; Ponte Verda HS (FL) (2008–2013) Head coach; Grove HS (OK) (2014-2016) Head coach; Rogers HS (AR) (2017–2020) Head coach

Awards and highlights
- As head coach: NJCAA National Champion (1991); 2× NJCAA National Runner-up (1992, 1994)

Career NFL statistics
- Passing attempts: 28
- Passing completions: 5
- Completion percentage: 17.9%
- TD–INT: 0–1
- Passing yards: 49
- Passer rating: 24.7
- Stats at Pro Football Reference

Charles Michael Loyd (born May 4, 1956) is an American former football player and coach. He played professionally as a quarterback in the National Football League (NFL). He was with the St. Louis Cardinals (1979–1980). He appeared in five games during the 1980 season and started one game.

Loyd later coached football at both the high school and junior college levels, including Northeastern Oklahoma A&M College in Miami, Oklahoma and Rogers High School in Rogers, Arkansas. At Rogers, Loyd coached Case Hampton for one year. After a nearly 40-year coaching career, Loyd retired in December 2020. He was inducted into the Joplin Sports Authority Hall of Fame in 2018 and the Northeastern Oklahoma A&M Athletics Hall of Fame in 2021.

== Career statistics ==
Year	Team	G	GS	Cmp	Att	Pct	Yds	Y/A	TD	Int	Rtg
1980	STL	5	1	5	28	17.9	49	1.8	0	1	39.6
1984	OK	2	0	11	23	47.8	274	11.9	1	1	116.3
Career		7	1	16	51	31.4	323	6.9	1	2	78.0
