= Duncan Thompson (American football) =

American football coach (1929–1997)

Biographical details
- Born: February 19, 1929
- Died: April 16, 1997 (aged 68)

Playing career
- 1947: Arkansas
- 1950: Tyler
- 1951–1952: East Texas State
- Position: End

Coaching career (HC unless noted)
- 1953: Linden HS (TX)
- 1954: Spring Hill HS (TX)
- 1955–1956: Linden HS (TX)
- 1957–1958: Texarkana

Administrative career (AD unless noted)
- 1955–1957: Linden HS (TX)
- 1957–1959: Texarkana

Head coaching record
- Overall: 18–2 (junior college)
- Bowls: 2–0 (junior college)

Accomplishments and honors

Championships
- Football; 1 NJCAA National (1957); 1 TJCC (1957); 1 TEC (1958)

Duncan W. Thompson (February 19, 1929 – April 16, 1997) was an American football coach and athletics administrator. He served as the head football coach at Texarkana Junior College—now known as Texarkana College—in Texarkana, Texas from 1957 to 1958. He led his 1957 Texarkana Bulldogs football team to an NJCAA National Football Championship.

A native of Atlanta, Texas, Thompson first played college football at the University of Arkansas in 1947. He then played at Tyler Junior College in 1950 and for two season at East Texas State Teachers College—now known as Texas A&M University–Commerce. He graduated from East Texas State in 1953 and began his coaching career that year as head football coach at Linden High School in Linden, Texas. The next year he took on the same position at Spring Hill High School in Longview, Texas. He returned to Linden in 1955 as head football coach and athletic director.

Thompson was hired as head football coach and athletic director at Texarkana Junior College in 1957, succeeding Woody Boyles. In early 1959, he turned down an offer to become freshman football coach at Baylor University. That spring, he resigned from his post at Texarkana to go into the oil business as a bulk agent for Humble Oil and Refining Co. in his hometown of Atlanta.

== Head coaching record ==
=== Junior college ===
Year	Team	Overall	Conference	Standing	Bowl/playoffs
Texarkana Bulldogs (Texas Junior College Conference) (1957)
1957	Texarkana	9–1	4–0	1st	W National Bowl
Texarkana Bulldogs (Texas Eastern Conference) (1958)
1958	Texarkana	9–1	2–1	T–1st	W Pine Bowl
Texarkana:		18–2	6–1		
Total:		18–2			
National championship Conference title Conference division title or championship game berth
