= 1972 junior college football season =

American junior college football season

- National Championship: El Toro Bowl, Yuma, AZ (NJCAA)
- Champion(s): Arizona Western (NJCAA)

The 1972 junior college football season was the season of intercollegiate junior college football running from September to December 1972. Arizona Western won the NJCAA National Football Championship, defeating Fort Scott in the El Toro Bowl in Yuma, Arizona.

Fresno City won the California state junior college large division playoffs, defeating Pasadena in the championship game at the Potato Bowl in Bakersfield, California, while Redwoods won the California state junior college small division playoffs, beating West Hills in the title game at Diablo Valley College in Pleasant Hill, California.

== Conference standings ==
=== California ===
==== Large division ====
1972 Camino Norte Conference football standings
	Conf.					Overall
Team	W		L		T	W		L		T
West Valley +	4	–	1	–	0	5	–	5	–	0
De Anza +^	4	–	1	–	0	?	–	?	–	?
Santa Rosa	3	–	2	–	0	?	–	?	–	?
Contra Costa	2	–	2	–	1	?	–	?	–	?
Solano	1	–	3	–	1	?	–	?	–	?
Marin	0	–	5	–	0	?	–	?	–	?
+ – Conference co-champions; ^ – California state junior college large division playoff participant

1972 Golden Gate Conference football standings
	Conf.					Overall
Team	W		L		T	W		L		T
Chabot $^	7	–	0	–	0	11	–	1	–	0
Foothill	5	–	1	–	1	6	–	3	–	1
Diablo Valley	4	–	3	–	0	7	–	3	–	0
Laney	4	–	3	–	0	5	–	5	–	0
San Mateo	3	–	4	–	0	6	–	4	–	0
San Jose City	3	–	4	–	0	4	–	5	–	0
Merritt	1	–	5	–	1	3	–	5	–	1
CC of San Francisco	0	–	7	–	0	0	–	9	–	0
$ – Conference champion; ^ – California state junior college large division playoff participant

1972 Metropolitan Conference football standings
	Conf.					Overall
Team	W		L		T	W		L		T
Pasadena $^	5	–	0	–	0	12	–	1	–	0
El Camino	4	–	1	–	0	7	–	1	–	1
Long Beach	2	–	3	–	0	5	–	3	–	1
Pierce	2	–	3	–	0	5	–	5	–	0
Bakersfield	2	–	3	–	0	3	–	6	–	0
Los Angeles Valley	0	–	5	–	0	2	–	7	–	0
$ – Conference champion; ^ – California state junior college large division playoff participant

1972 Mission Conference football standings
	Conf.					Overall
Team	W		L		T	W		L		T
Saddleback +^	5	–	1	–	1	9	–	2	–	1
Citrus +	5	–	1	–	1	5	–	4	–	1
Palomar	5	–	2	–	0	7	–	3	–	0
Southwestern (CA)	5	–	2	–	0	7	–	3	–	0
San Diego City	2	–	5	–	0	2	–	8	–	0
Chaffey	2	–	5	–	0	3	–	7	–	0
Grossmont	2	–	5	–	0	2	–	7	–	0
Riverside	1	–	6	–	0	1	–	9	–	0
San Bernardino *	0	–	0	–	0	7	–	3	–	0
+ – Conference co-champions; ^ – California state junior college large division playoff participant * – San Bernardino had a 7–1 record against conference opponents, but was declared ineligible for postseason play and the team's games did not count in the conference standings.

1972 South Coast Conference (California) football standings
	Conf.					Overall
Team	W		L		T	W		L		T
Cerritos $^	3	–	1	–	1	4	–	3	–	3
Santa Ana	3	–	2	–	0	7	–	3	–	0
Orange Coast	3	–	2	–	0	6	–	3	–	0
Fullerton	2	–	2	–	1	4	–	4	–	1
San Diego Mesa	2	–	3	–	0	4	–	5	–	0
Mt. San Antonio	1	–	4	–	0	5	–	5	–	0
$ – Conference champion; ^ – California state junior college large division playoff participant

1972 Southern California Conference football standings
	Conf.					Overall
Team	W		L		T	W		L		T
Rio Hondo $^	7	–	0	–	0	7	–	3	–	0
Golden West	5	–	2	–	0	?	–	?	–	?
Los Angeles City	4	–	3	–	0	?	–	?	–	?
Santa Monica	3	–	4	–	0	?	–	?	–	?
Los Angeles Southwest	3	–	4	–	0	?	–	?	–	?
East Los Angeles	2	–	5	–	0	?	–	?	–	?
Harbor	2	–	5	–	0	?	–	?	–	?
Cypress	2	–	5	–	0	?	–	?	–	?
$ – Conference champion; ^ – California state junior college large division playoff participant

1972 Valley Conference football standings
	Conf.					Overall
Team	W		L		T	W		L		T
Fresno City $^	6	–	0	–	1	11	–	1	–	1
Reedley	5	–	2	–	0	8	–	2	–	0
Modesto	5	–	2	–	0	7	–	3	–	0
San Joaquin Delta	4	–	3	–	0	5	–	5	–	0
Cosumnes River	3	–	4	–	0	4	–	5	–	0
American River	2	–	4	–	1	3	–	6	–	1
Sequoias	2	–	5	–	0	2	–	8	–	0
Sacramento City	0	–	7	–	0	1	–	9	–	0
$ – Conference champion; ^ – California state junior college large division playoff participant

1972 Western State Conference football standings
	Conf.					Overall
Team	W		L		T	W		L		T
Santa Barbara City +	6	–	1	–	0	9	–	1	–	0
West Los Angeles +^	6	–	1	–	0	7	–	3	–	0
Ventura	5	–	2	–	0	7	–	3	–	0
Hancock	4	–	2	–	1	6	–	2	–	1
College of the Canyons	3	–	3	–	1	5	–	3	–	1
Moorpark	2	–	5	–	0	4	–	6	–	0
Glendale (CA)	1	–	6	–	0	3	–	7	–	0
Compton	0	–	7	–	0	0	–	10	–	0
+ – Conference co-champions; ^ – California state junior college large division playoff participant

==== Small division ====
1972 Central Conference football standings
	Conf.					Overall
Team	W		L		T	W		L		T
West Hills $^	4	–	1	–	0	7	–	4	–	0
Merced	3	–	2	–	0	6	–	4	–	0
Cuesta	3	–	2	–	0	4	–	5	–	0
Taft	3	–	2	–	0	4	–	6	–	0
Antelope Valley	2	–	3	–	0	5	–	5	–	0
Porterville	0	–	5	–	0	3	–	7	–	0
$ – Conference champion; ^ – California state junior college small division playoff participant

1972 Coast Conference football standings
	Conf.					Overall
Team	W		L		T	W		L		T
Cabrillo $^	4	–	1	–	0	8	–	3	–	0
Hartnell	3	–	2	–	0	7	–	3	–	0
Menlo	3	–	2	–	0	7	–	3	–	0
Monterey Peninsula	3	–	2	–	0	4	–	5	–	0
Gavilan	2	–	3	–	0	5	–	4	–	0
Ohlone	0	–	5	–	0	1	–	9	–	0
$ – Conference champion; ^ – California state junior college small division playoff participant

1972 Desert Conference football standings
	Conf.					Overall
Team	W		L		T	W		L		T
MiraCosta $^	4	–	1	–	1	5	–	4	–	1
Desert	3	–	1	–	2	?	–	?	–	?
Victor Valley	4	–	2	–	0	?	–	?	–	?
Imperial Valley	4	–	2	–	0	?	–	?	–	?
Barstow	3	–	2	–	1	?	–	?	–	?
Palo Verde	1	–	5	–	0	?	–	?	–	?
Mt. San Jacinto	0	–	6	–	0	?	–	?	–	?
$ – Conference champion; ^ – California state junior college small division playoff participant

1972 Golden Valley Conference football standings
	Conf.					Overall
Team	W		L		T	W		L		T
Redwoods $^	5	–	0	–	0	11	–	0	–	0
Shasta	4	–	1	–	0	4	–	5	–	0
Butte	3	–	2	–	0	5	–	4	–	0
Siskiyous	2	–	3	–	0	2	–	7	–	0
Sierra	0	–	4	–	1	1	–	7	–	1
Yuba	0	–	4	–	1	0	–	7	–	1
$ – Conference champion; ^ – California state junior college small division playoff participant

=== NJCAA ===
1972 Arizona Junior College Athletic Conference football standings
	Conf.					Overall
Team	W		L		T	W		L		T
Arizona Western $	4	–	0	–	0	10	–	0	–	0
Phoenix	3	–	1	–	0	7	–	1	–	1
Mesa (AZ)	2	–	2	–	0	8	–	2	–	0
Eastern Arizona	1	–	3	–	0	4	–	5	–	0
Glendale (AZ)	0	–	4	–	0	1	–	8	–	0
$ – Conference champion

1972 Iowa Junior College Conference football standings
	Conf.					Overall
Team	W		L		T	W		L		T
Iowa Central $	6	–	0	–	0	8	–	0	–	2
Ellsworth	5	–	1	–	0	6	–	3	–	0
Indian Hills	4	–	2	–	0	5	–	4	–	0
Waldorf	3	–	3	–	0	5	–	5	–	0
North Iowa Area	2	–	4	–	0	4	–	5	–	0
Marshalltown	1	–	5	–	0	1	–	8	–	0
Iowa Lakes	0	–	6	–	0	0	–	9	–	0
$ – Conference champion

1972 Coastal Football Conference standings
	Conf.					Overall
Team	W		L		T	W		L		T
Ferrum $	3	–	1	–	0	7	–	1	–	0
Wesley	4	–	1	–	1	7	–	1	–	1
Chowan	4	–	2	–	0	6	–	3	–	0
Baltimore	2	–	4	–	0	4	–	5	–	0
Lees–McRae	2	–	4	–	0	3	–	6	–	0
Potomac State	1	–	3	–	2	1	–	6	–	2
Harford	1	–	4	–	1	2	–	6	–	1
$ – Conference champion

1972 Northwest Community College Conference football standings
	Conf.					Overall
Team	W		L		T	W		L		T
Eastern Division
Columbia Basin xy$	6	–	1	–	1	8	–	1	–	1
Spokane Falls	5	–	3	–	0	6	–	3	–	0
Walla Walla	3	–	3	–	2	4	–	3	–	2
Yakima	3	–	5	–	0	4	–	5	–	0
Wenatchee Valley	2	–	5	–	1	3	–	5	–	1
Western Division
Grays Harbor xy	6	–	2	–	0	7	–	3	–	0
Everett	4	–	4	–	0	5	–	4	–	0
Olympic	4	–	4	–	0	4	–	5	–	0
Mt. Hood	1	–	7	–	0	2	–	7	–	0
NWCCC championship game: Columbia Basin 26, Grays Harbor 13
$ – Conference champion; x – Division champion/co-champions; y – Championship game participant

1972 Intermountain Collegiate Athletic Conference football standings
	Conf.					Overall
Team	W		L		T	W		L		T
Snow $	3	–	0	–	1	?	–	?	–	?
Dixie (UT)	2	–	2	–	0	?	–	?	–	?
Mesa (CO)	1	–	1	–	1	4	–	3	–	2
Ricks	0	–	3	–	0	?	–	?	–	?
$ – Conference champion

1972 Texas Junior College Football Federation standings
	Conf.					Overall
Team	W		L		T	W		L		T
Blinn $	7	–	0	–	0	10	–	0	–	0
Navarro	5	–	2	–	0	7	–	3	–	0
Tyler	5	–	2	–	0	7	–	3	–	0
Kilgore	4	–	3	–	0	6	–	4	–	0
Henderson County	3	–	4	–	0	3	–	7	–	0
Wharton	2	–	5	–	0	3	–	6	–	0
Ranger	2	–	5	–	0	2	–	8	–	0
Cisco	0	–	7	–	0	1	–	8	–	0
$ – Conference champion

== California state playoffs ==
=== Large division ===
Quarterfinals; November 25
West Valley	18
Chabot	21
Cerritos	10
Fresno City	12
Saddleback	24
Rio Hondo	23
West Los Angeles	13
Pasadena	28

Semifinals; December 2
Chabot	26
Fresno City	39
Saddleback	3
Pasadena	7

Championship game December 9 Potato Bowl—Bakersfield, California
Fresno City	48
Pasadena	14

=== Small division ===
Semifinals; November 25
MiraCosta	18
West Hills	26
Cabrillo	13
Redwoods	37

Championship game December 2 Diablo Valley College—Pleasant Hill, California
West Hills	21
Redwoods	41
