= Troy Morrell =

American football coach (born 1971)

Biographical details
- Born: March 23, 1971 (age 55); Benkelman, Nebraska, U.S.

Playing career
- 1990–1991: Butler County
- Position: Offensive lineman

Coaching career (HC unless noted)
- 1996–1997: Butler County (OL)
- 1998–1999: Butler County (OC)
- 2000–2014: Butler County / Butler (KS)
- 2024: Utah State (assoc HC / sr. off. analyst)

Head coaching record
- Overall: 154–22
- Bowls: 6–7 (junior college)
- Tournaments: 30–3 (NJCAA Region VI playoffs)

Accomplishments and honors

Championships
- 3 NJCAA National (2003, 2007–2008); 12 KJCCC (2001–2008, 2010–2013); 11 NJCAA Region VI (2001–2004, 2006–2008, 2010–2013)

Awards
- 5× KJCCC Coach of the Year (2003–2005, 2007–2008)

Troy Morrell (born March 23, 1971) is an American college football coach. He served as the head football coach at Butler Community College—known as Butler County Community College prior to 2005—in El Dorado, Kansas from 2000 to 2014, compiling a record of 154–22 and leading his teams to three NJCAA National Football Championships, in 2003, 2007, and 2008.

Morrell was born on March 23, 1971, in Benkelman, Nebraska. He graduated from Buhler High School, in Buhler, Kansas, in 1990. Morrell played football at Butler County from 1990 to 1991 before transferring to Fort Hays State University in Hays, Kansas. He returned to Butler County in 1996 as offensive line coach and was promoted to offensive coordinator in 1998. He succeeded James Shibest as head football coach in 2000.

Morrell resigned from his post at Butler after the 2014 season to enter private business. He was inducted into the Kansas Sports Hall of Fame in the class of 2015.

On July 25, 2024, Morrell was announced as associate head coach and senior offensive analyst for Utah State University under interim head football coach Nate Dreiling.

== Head coaching record ==
Year	Team	Overall	Conference	Standing	Bowl/playoffs	NJCAA^{#}
Butler County / Butler Grizzlies (Kansas Jayhawk Community College Conference) (2000–2014)
2000	Butler County	10–2	6–1	2nd	L Region IV championship, W Empire State Bowl	6
2001	Butler County	10–2	6–1	T–1st	W Region IV championship, L Golden Isles Bowl	8
2002	Butler County	10–2	7–0	1st	W Region IV championship, L Dixie Rotary Bowl	7
2003	Butler County	12–0	7–0	1st	W Region IV championship, W Dixie Rotary Bowl	1
2004	Butler County	11–1	7–0	1st	W Region IV championship, L Dalton Defenders Bowl	2
2005	Butler	9–2	7–0	1st	L Region IV semifinal, L Top of the Mountain Bowl	10
2006	Butler	11–1	6–1	T–1st	W Region IV championship, W Dalton Defenders Bowl	2
2007	Butler	12–0	7–0	1st	W Region IV championship, W Top of the Mountain Bowl	1
2008	Butler	11–1	7–0	1st	W Region IV championship, W Top of the Mountain Bowl	1
2009	Butler	8–3	6–1	2nd	L Region IV championship	10
2010	Butler	11–1	7–0	1st	W Region IV championship, L Citizen's Bank Bowl	2
2011	Butler	11–1	6–0	1st	W Region IV championship, W Citizen's Bank Bowl	2
2012	Butler	11–1	7–0	1st	W Region IV championship, L Graphic Edge Bowl	2
2013	Butler	9–2	6–1	1st	W Region IV championship, L Graphic Edge Bowl	6
2014	Butler	8–3	5–2	3rd		6
Butler County / Butler:		154–22	97–7			
Total:		154–22				
National championship Conference title Conference division title or championship game berth
