= Glen Wolfe =

American football coach (1939–2015)

Biographical details
- Born: June 24, 1939; Holdenville, Oklahoma, U.S.
- Died: September 29, 2015 (aged 76); Rogers, Arkansas, U.S.

Playing career
- 1959–1960: Murray State (OK)
- 1961–1962: East Central
- Positions: Fullback, halfback

Coaching career (HC unless noted)
- 1963: Pawnee HS (OK) (assistant)
- 1964–1965: Lindsay HS (OK) (assistant)
- 1966–1970: Holdenville HS (OK)
- 1971–1974: Moore HS (OK)
- 1975–1977: Northwestern Oklahoma State
- 1978–1990: Northeastern Oklahoma A&M
- 1991: Georgia Military

Head coaching record
- Overall: 10–21–1 (college); 114–23–3 (junior college)
- Bowls: 7–3 (junior college)

Accomplishments and honors

Championships
- 2 NJCAA National (1980, 1986)

Glen Doris Wolfe (June 24, 1939 – September 29, 2015) was an American football coach. He served as the head football coach at Northwestern Oklahoma State University from 1975 to 1977, Northeastern Oklahoma A&M College from 1978 to 1990, and Georgia Military College in 1991. At Northeastern Oklahoma A&M, he led his teams to a record of 110–18–3 and two NJCAA National Football Championships, in 1980 and 1986.

Wolfe was born on June 24, 1939, in Holdenville, Oklahoma. He graduated from Shawnee High School in Shawnee, Oklahoma and later earned degrees from Murray State College in Tishomingo, Oklahoma and from East Central State College—now known as East Central University—in Ada, Oklahoma. He played football at both Murray State and East Central.

Wolfe began his coach career in 1963 at Pawnee High School in Pawnee, Oklahoma as an assistant to head football coach Lee Horne. In 1964, he moved to Lindsay High School in Lindsay, Oklahoma, where he was an assistant football coach for two seasons. In 1966, he was hired as head football coach at Holdenville High School in Holdenville, Oklahoma. After five seasons at Holdenville, Wolfe resigned to take on the same role at Moore High School in Moore, Oklahoma.

Wolfe was hired as head football coach at Northwestern Oklahoma State in 1975, succeeding Bobby Thompson. After three seasons at Northwestern Oklahoma State, he took on the same role at Northeastern Oklahoma A&M. Following his 13-year tenure at Northeastern Oklahoma A&M, Wolfe was hired as the head football coach at Georgia Military College, which had not fielded a football team since 1959. Wolfe resigned after one season because of budgets cuts and was succeeded by the team's defensive coordinator, Robert Nunn.

Wolfe died on September 29, 2015, in Rogers, Arkansas.

== Head coaching record ==
=== College ===
Year	Team	Overall	Conference	Standing	Bowl/playoffs
Northwestern Oklahoma State Rangers (Oklahoma Intercollegiate Conference) (1975–1977)
1975	Northwestern Oklahoma State	2–9	0–5	6th	
1976	Northwestern Oklahoma State	4–5–1	1–2–1	T–3rd	
1977	Northwestern Oklahoma State	4–7	0–4	5th	
Northwestern Oklahoma State:		10–21–1	1–11–1		
Total:		10–21–1			

=== Junior college ===
Year	Team	Overall	Conference	Standing	Bowl/playoffs
Northeastern Oklahoma A&M Golden Norsemen (NJCAA independent) (1978–1990)
1978	Northeastern Oklahoma A&M	7–2–1			
1979	Northeastern Oklahoma A&M	8–2			W Beef Empire Classic
1980	Northeastern Oklahoma A&M	10–0			W Garland-Texas Bowl
1981	Northeastern Oklahoma A&M	9–1			L Rodeo Bowl
1982	Northeastern Oklahoma A&M	9–1			W Garland-Texas Bowl
1983	Northeastern Oklahoma A&M	9–0–1			W Garland-Texas Bowl
1984	Northeastern Oklahoma A&M	6–2–1			
1985	Northeastern Oklahoma A&M	7–3			L Mid-American Bowl
1986	Northeastern Oklahoma A&M	11–0			W Mid-American Bowl
1987	Northeastern Oklahoma A&M	9–2			W Mid-American Bowl
1988	Northeastern Oklahoma A&M	9–1			W Mid-American Bowl
1989	Northeastern Oklahoma A&M	8–2			L Dixie Rotary Bowl
1990	Northeastern Oklahoma A&M	8–2			
Northeastern Oklahoma A&M:		110–18–3			
Georgia Military Bulldogs (NJCAA independent) (1991)
1991	Georgia Military	4–5			
Georgia Military:		4–5			
Total:		114–23–3			
National championship Conference title Conference division title or championship game berth
