= Brad Franchione =

American football coach

Biographical details
- Born: c. 1974; Miller, Missouri, U.S.

Coaching career (HC unless noted)
- 1998: Fort Scott (QB)
- 1999–2001: East Central (DL/ST)
- 2001–2002: West Alabama (LB)
- 2002: Tennessee–Martin (LB)
- 2003–2004: Bacone (DC)
- 2004: Texas A&M–Commerce (DL)
- 2005–2010: Blinn
- 2011–2015: Texas State (LB/ST)

Head coaching record
- Overall: 54–13
- Bowls: 3–1
- Tournaments: 6–3 (SWJCFC playoffs)

Accomplishments and honors

Championships
- 2 NJCAA National (2006, 2009); 3 SWJCFC (2006, 2008–2009)

Awards
- 2× SWJCFC Coach of the Year (2006, 2008), American Community College Football Coaches Association Coach of the Year (2009)

Bradley Todd Franchione (born c. 1974) is an American former college football coach. He served as the head football coach at Blinn College in Brenham, Texas from 2005 to 2010, compiling a record of 54–13 and leading his teams to two NJCAA National Football Championship, in 2006 and 2009. Franchione is the son of retired football coach Dennis Franchione.

== Early life ==
Franchione is the son of college football coach and former ESPN announcer Dennis Franchione and Linda Solomon. Franchione was born in Miller, Missouri, and grew up near Pittsburg, Kansas. He graduated from Pittsburg High School in 1992 and earned a bachelor's degree in physical education in 1996 from the University of New Mexico. Two years later he received his M.S. in education from Arkansas State University. Franchione began his coaching career while still in college. He was a student coach assisting the secondary at the University of New Mexico from 1992 to 1996, and served as a graduate assistant with the offense at Arkansas State from 1996 to 1998.

== Early career ==
After his graduation from Arkansas State, Franchione received his first official coaching job as an assistant at Fort Scott Community College, working with quarterbacks and the punt team and serving as video coordinator. After a year there, Franchione move to East Central University, where from 1999 to 2001 he was the defensive line coach and recruiting coordinator, as well as the academic and special teams coordinator. He helped lead the 2000 team to its first winning season in 17 years. In 2001 and 2002, Franchione was an assistant coach at the University of West Alabama, where he worked with linebackers and the punt and kickoff teams. He held the same position at the University of Tennessee at Martin in 2002.

The next season (2003), Franchione was an associate head coach, defensive coordinator, and recruiting coordinator at Bacone College. The team earned second place in the Central States Football League (CSFL). In 2004, Franchione served as defensive line coach at Texas A&M University–Commerce. In his single season there, he was also the academic, travel, and video coordinator for the team. He was responsible for recruiting at Kansas junior colleges and in central Texas, an area that included his next school, Blinn.

== Blinn College ==
In his 10th year as a coach, Franchione earned his first head coaching opportunity when he was hired to coach the Blinn Buccaneers in Brenham, Texas in January 2005. In their 2006 season, Franchione's second year as their coach, the team had a perfect 12–0 season and earned a national championship when they were awarded the number one ranking in the final NJCAA Football Poll of the 2006 season. The team's defense was ranked number one in the country, giving up an average of only 129 yard per game, and allowing only 39 rushing yards per game. Four of the team's players were named NJCAA All-Americans. For his coaching efforts, Franchione was named the 2006 Southwest Junior College Conference Coach of the Year and the Sportex 2006 National Junior College Coach of the Year.

In 2009 Blinn won their second national championship, and Franchione was named the 2009 American Community College Football Coaches Association Coach of the Year. The 2009 Blinn squad led by future Heisman Trophy winner Cam Newton finished the season with an 11–1 overall record, the Southwest Junior College Football Conference (SWJCFC) title and the National Junior College Athletic Association (NJCAA) national title.

Franchione resigned his position as Blinn head coach on January 3, 2011, and in his five years (2005–2009) at Blinn amassed a 54–13 record.

== Texas State ==
In January 2011 Franchione accepted a position at Texas State University as linebackers coach and special teams coordinator. In 2012, he coached future NFL linebacker Joplo Bartu. The special teams finished in the top ten in FBS in punt returns (16.71), kickoff returns (26.18) and net punting (40.43). His special teams unit finished 32nd in Phil Steele's special teams rankings. In 2013, the defense finished 2nd in total defense in the Sun Belt Conference as Texas State finished bowl eligible for the first time in program history. In 2014, he coached future NFL linebacker and the leading tackler in the Sun Belt Conference, David Mayo. Dennis Franchione (Head Coach) quit in December 2015. Brad was released from TXST in 2016.

== Family ==
Franchione has two sons, Wyatt and Gunnar and one daughter, Isabella.

== Head coaching record ==
Year	Team	Overall	Conference	Standing	Bowl/playoffs
Blinn Buccaneers (Southwest Junior College Football Conference) (2005–2010)
2005	Blinn	7–3	4–2	T–1st	L SWJCFC semifinal
2006	Blinn	12–0	6–0	1st	W SWJCFC championship, W Pilgrim's Pride Bowl
2007	Blinn	7–3	4–2	T–2nd	L SWJCFC semifinal
2008	Blinn	9–3	5–2	T–2nd	W SWJCFC championship, L C.H.A.M.P.S. Heart of Texas Bowl
2009	Blinn	11–1	6–1		W SWJCFC championship, W Citizen's Bank Bowl
2010	Blinn	8–3	5–2		L SWJCFC semifinal, W C.H.A.M.P.S. Heart of Texas Bowl
Blinn:		54–13	30–9		
Total:		54–13			
National championship Conference title Conference division title or championship game berth
