= Bob McElroy =

American football coach (1932–2021

Biographical details
- Born: April 10, 1932
- Died: August 15, 2021 (aged 89)

Playing career
- 1950–1953: East Central
- Position: Halfback

Coaching career (HC unless noted)
- 1954: Marietta HS (OK) (assistant)
- 1955–1956: Chickasha HS (OK) (assistant)
- 1957–1964: Ector HS (TX) (assistant)
- 1965–1967: Frederick HS (OK)
- 1968–1972: Corsicana HS (TX) (assistant)
- 1973–1985: Navarro (assistant)
- 1986–1993: Navarro

Head coaching record
- Overall: 62–18–3 (junior college)
- Bowls: 3–1–1 (junior college)

Accomplishments and honors

Championships
- 1 NJCAA National (1989); 2 TJCFC (1989, 1993)

Robert McElroy (April 10, 1932 – August 15, 2021) was an American football coach. He served at the head football coach at Navarro College in Corsicana, Texas from 1986 to 1993, compiling a record of 62–18–3 and leading his team a NJCAA National Football Championship in 1989.

McElory attended Alex High School in Alex, Oklahoma and then played college football at East Central State College—now known as East Central University in Ada, Oklahoma. In 1954, he coached at Marietta High School in Marietta, Oklahoma. The following year he moved to Chickasha High School in Chickasha, Oklahoma.

McElroy died on August 15, 2021.

== Head coaching record ==
=== Junior college ===
Year	Team	Overall	Conference	Standing	Bowl/playoffs
Navarro Bulldogs (Texas Junior College Football Conference) (1986–1993)
1986	Navarro	5–5	3–3	T–2nd	
1987	Navarro	8–2–1	4–2	T–2nd	W Valley of the Sun Bowl
1988	Navarro	7–3	5–1	2nd	L Kansas Jayhawk Bowl
1989	Navarro	10–0	6–0	1st	W Mid-American Bowl
1990	Navarro	7–3	5–1	2nd	
1991	Navarro	9–2	4–2	3rd	W Dixie Rotary Bowl
1992	Navarro	8–2	4–2	3rd	
1993	Navarro	8–1–2	5–1	T–1st	T Texas Shrine Bowl
Navarro:		62–18–3	36–12		
Total:		62–18–3			
National championship Conference title Conference division title or championship game berth
