= Joe Kersting =

American football coach

Biographical details
- Born: c. 1955

Playing career
- 1973–1974: Northwest Missouri State
- 1976–1977: Northern Arizona
- Position: Defensive back

Coaching career (HC unless noted)
- 1978: Cascia Hall Prep (OK) (assistant)
- 1979–1980: Northern Arizona (GA)
- 1981–1982: Glendale (AZ) (DB)
- 1983: Glendale (AZ) (DC)
- 1984–1985: Northern Arizona (DB)
- 1986: Arizona (volunteer GA)
- 1987–1996: Glendale (AZ)
- 1997: Northern Arizona (DB/STC)
- 2000: Glendale (AZ) (OC)
- 2001–2006: Glendale (AZ)
- 2010–2011: Deer Valley HS (AZ)
- 2014–2016: Arizona Christian (DC)
- 2019: Prescott HS (AZ) (OC/QB)
- 2021: Sandra Day O'Connor HS (AZ) (AHC/STC)

Head coaching record
- Overall: 115–45–2 (junior college)
- Bowls: 7–4 (junior college)

Accomplishments and honors

Championships
- 2 NJCAA National (1988, 2005); 5 WSFL (1988, 1990–1991, 2005–2006)

Joe Kersting (born c. 1955) is an American former football coach. He served two stints at head football coach at Glendale Community College in Glendale, Arizona from 1987 to 1996 and 2001 to 2007. He led the Glendale Gauchos to two NJCAA National Football Championship, in 1988 and 2005.

Kersting played football at Northwest Missouri State University in 1973 and 1974 before transferring to Northern Arizona University, where he played in 1976 and 1977 under head coach Joe Salem. He began his coaching career in 1978 as an assistant at Cascia Hall Preparatory School in Tulsa, Oklahoma. Kersting was a graduate assistant at Northern Arizona from 1979 to 1980.

Kersting was an assistant coach at Glendale under head coach Chuck Zontanos from 1981 to 1983, first as a defensive backs coach for two seasons, before being promoted to defensive coordinator in 1983. In 1984, he was hired as defensive backs coach at his alma mater, Northern Arizona, where he remained until the spring of 1986. Kersting spent the 1986 season at the University of Arizona as a volunteer graduate assistant. He returned to Glendale as head football coach in 1987, succeeding Fred Haeger. In 1997, Kersting went back to Northern Arizona for a third time, as defensive backs coach and special teams coordinator under head coach Steve Axman.

Kersting resigned as head football coach at Glendale in early 2007, and was succeeding by defensive assistant, Mickey Bell.

From 2010 to 2011, Kersting was the head football coach at Deer Valley High School in Glendale. He led the Deer Valley Skyhawks to a 10–2 record and the state quarterfinals in 2011 before resigning. He was hired as the defensive coordinator for the new football program at Arizona Christian University under head coach Donnie Yantis in 2014 and retained in 2016 when Jeff Bowen look over the program as head coach. In 2019, Kersting went back to high school coaching as offensive coordinator and quarterbacks coach at Prescott High in Prescott, Arizona under head coach Cody Collett. In 2021, Kersting joined the football coaching staff at Sandra Day O'Connor High School in Phoenix, Arizona as assistant head coach and special teams coordinator under head coach Brian Cole. Cole had played high school football for Kersting's father, Jack, who coached the team, and alongside his brother, Kerry.

== Head coaching record ==
=== Junior college ===
Year	Team	Overall	Conference	Standing	Bowl/playoffs
Glendale Gauchos (Western States Football League) (1987–1996)
1987	Glendale	3–6	3–6	7th	
1988	Glendale	10–0	8–0	1st	W Valley of the Sun Bowl
1989	Glendale	4–3–1	4–3–1	T–4th	
1990	Glendale	7–3	6–2	T–1st	L Valley of the Sun Bowl
1991	Glendale	8–2	7–1	1st	L Valley of the Sun Bowl
1992	Glendale	7–3	5–3	T–3rd	W Valley of the Sun Bowl
1993	Glendale	8–2	7–2	2nd	W Valley of the Sun Bowl
1994	Glendale	4–4–1	3–4–1	T–5th	
1995	Glendale	7–4	6–3	4th	L Valley of the Sun Bowl
1996	Glendale	8–3	5–3	T–3rd	W Valley of the Sun Bowl
Glendale Gauchos (Western States Football League) (2001–2006)
2001	Glendale	5–5	5–5	T–5th	
2002	Glendale	9–2	7–2	T–2nd	W Valley of the Sun Bowl
2003	Glendale	9–2	7–2	3rd	W Valley of the Sun Bowl
2004	Glendale	6–4	6–3	T–3rd	
2005	Glendale	11–0	9–0	1st	W Valley of the Sun Bowl
2006	Glendale	9–2	7–2	T–1st	L Valley of the Sun Bowl
Glendale:		115–45–2	95–41–2		
Total:		115–45–2			
National championship Conference title Conference division title or championship game berth
