= James Shibest =

American football player and coach (born 1964)

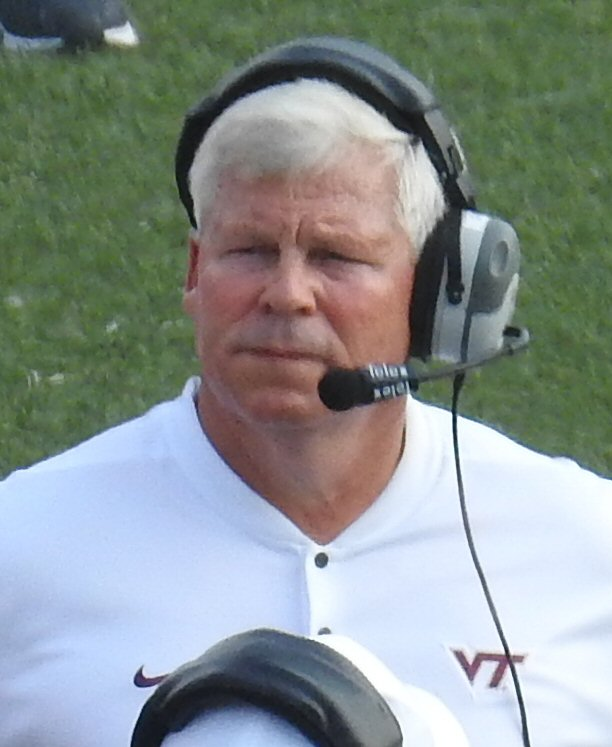
- Shibest in 2018

Purdue Boilermakers
- Title: Special teams coordinator

Personal information
- Born: October 31, 1964 (age 62); Fort Riley, Kansas, U.S.
- Listed height: 5 ft 10 in (1.78 m)
- Listed weight: 187 lb (85 kg)

Career information
- High school: MacArthur (Houston, Texas)
- College: Arkansas
- NFL draft: 1987: undrafted

Career history

Playing
- Atlanta Falcons (1987)

Coaching
- Oklahoma State (1990–1991) Graduate assistant; Independence (1992) Offensive coordinator; Independence (1993) Defensive backs coach; Garden City (1994–1995) Offensive coordinator, quarterbacks coach, & wide receivers coach; Butler County (1996–1999) Head coach; Arkansas (2000–2007) Special teams coordinator, wide receivers coach, & tight ends coach; Ole Miss (2008–2011) Special teams coordinator & tight ends coach; Memphis (2012–2015) Special teams coordinator & tight ends coach; Virginia Tech (2016–2021) Special teams coordinator & tight ends coach; UNLV (2023–2024) Special teams coordinator; Purdue (2025–present) Special teams coordinator

Awards and highlights
- 2 NJCAA National Championships (1998–1999); 1 KJCCC regular championship (1998); 2 KJCCC playoff championships (1998–1999); 2× NJCAA Coach of the Year (1998–1999) 2× KJCCC Coach of the Year (1996, 1998); 2× First-team All-SWC (1984, 1986)
- Stats at Pro Football Reference

James John Shibest (born October 31, 1964) is an American football coach and former wide receiver, who is the special teams coordinator at Purdue University, a position he has held since the 2025 season. Shibest served as the head football coach at Butler County Community College—now known as Butler Community College—from 1996 and 1999, leading the Grizzlies to two NJCAA National Football Championships. For most of his career, he has been a special teams coach. Shibest played college football at the University of Arkansas and briefly in the National Football League (NFL) as a replacement player during the 1987 strike.

== Playing career ==
In high school, Shibest was a prep All-American wide receiver at MacArthur High School in Houston. Shibest played wide receiver at Arkansas for head coach Ken Hatfield from 1983 to 1986. He earned All-Southwest Conference honors in 1984 and 1986, and set a then-school record for receiving. He helped Arkansas finish 10-2 in 1985 and beat Arizona State in the 1985 Holiday Bowl. He also played one game in 1987 for the Atlanta Falcons of the National Football League (NFL) as a replacement during that year's player strike.

== Coaching career ==
Shibest began his coaching career as an offensive graduate assistant working with the running backs and wide receivers at Oklahoma State for the 1990 and 1991 football seasons. From Oklahoma State, Shibest moved on to Independence Community College, where he was the offensive coordinator in 1992, and the defensive backs coach in 1993. In 1994 and 1995, Shibest was the offensive coordinator for Garden City Community College.

In 1996, Shibest was hired as the head football coach at Butler County Community College—now known as Butler Community College. In four years, from 1996 to 1999, Shibest led the Grizzlies to two Kansas Jayhawk Community College Conference (KJCCC) titles and two NJCAA National Football Championships. He was twice named the KJCCC Coach of the year and also twice named the NJCAA Coach of the year.

In 2000, Shibest joined Houston Nutt's staff at Arkansas as the tight ends coach and special teams coordinator. He also coached wide receivers during his tenure at Arkansas, helping the Razorbacks win the SEC West Division title in 2002 and 2006, and win the 2003 Independence Bowl over Missouri. In 2008, Shibest followed Nutt to Ole Miss as the tight ends and special teams coach, helping the Rebels win back-to-back Cotton Bowls. In 2012, he joined Justin Fuente's staff at Memphis in the same position. He then followed Fuente to Virginia Tech in 2016. Shibest stayed at Va Tech through 2021, when Fuente was fired. In 2023 he accepted the Special Teams Coordinator position at UNLV under head coach Barry Odom. When Odom left for Purdue after the 2024 season, Shibest followed.

== Personal life ==
Shibest and his wife, Dianna, have two children, James John III and Jordyn Grace.

== Head coaching record ==
Year	Team	Overall	Conference	Standing	Bowl/playoffs	NJCAA^{#}
Butler County Grizzlies (Kansas Jayhawk Community College Conference) (1996–1999)
1996	Butler County	7–4	5–2	T–3rd	L KJCCC semifinal, L Valley of the Sun Bowl	15
1997	Butler County	4–5	4–3	T–3rd	L KJCCC quarterfinal	
1998	Butler County	12–0	7–0	1st	W KJCCC championship, W Real Dairy Bowl	1
1999	Butler County	11–1	6–1	2nd	W KJCCC championship, W Dixie Rotary Bowl	1
Butler County:		34–10	22–6			
Total:		34–10				
National championship Conference title Conference division title or championship game berth
