= Cliff Long =

American football coach, college athletics administrator, educator (1918–1999)

Biographical details
- Born: August 5, 1918; Edna, Kansas, U.S.
- Died: August 2, 1999 (aged 80); Coffeyville, Kansas, U.S.

Playing career
- c. 1937: Coffeyville
- c. 1939: Baker
- 1943–1945: Fort Warren

Coaching career (HC unless noted)
- 1943–1945: Fort Warren (assistant)
- 1946–1948: Coffeyville (backfield)
- 1949–1956: Coffeyville

Administrative career (AD unless noted)
- 1975–1978: KJJCC/KJCCC (commissioner)

Head coaching record
- Bowls: 1–0 (junior college)

Accomplishments and honors

Championships
- Football; 1 NJCAA National (1956); 3 KJCC (1953–1954, 1956); 3 KJCC East Division (1949–1951)

Clifford D. Long (August 5, 1918 – August 2, 1999) was an American football coach, college athletics administrator, and educator. He served as the head football coach at Coffeyville Junior College—now known as Coffeyville Community College—in Coffeyville, Kansas from 1949 to 1950. He led his 1956 Coffeyville Red Ravens football team to an NJCAA National Football Championship.

Long attended high school in Edna, Kansas and was a three-sport athlete at Coffeyville and Baker University in Baldwin City, Kansas. During World War II, he coach football and basketball at Fort Warren in Wyoming. Long returned to Coffeyville in 1946 and was backfield coach for three seasons before succeeding Demp Cannon as head football coach in 1949.

Long left Coffeyville Junior College in 1957 to become the principal at Roosevelt Junior High School, also located in Coffeyville. He later became assistant superintendent of Coffeyville's publics schools until 1964, when he resigned to the take the position of director of extension and alumni public relations at Kansas State College of Pittsburg—now known as Pittsburg State University—Pittsburg, Kansas.

In 1975, Long was appointed commissioner of the Kansas Jayhawk Junior College Conference (KJJCC)—now known as the Kansas Jayhawk Community College Conference (KJCCC). He served in that role until resigning in 1978.

Long died on August 2, 1999.

== Head coaching record ==
Year	Team	Overall	Conference	Standing	Bowl/playoffs
Coffeyville Red Ravens (Kansas Junior College Conference) (1949–1956)
1949	Coffeyville		5–0	1st (East)	
1950	Coffeyville		5–0	1st (East)	
1951	Coffeyville		3–0–1	1st (East)	
1952	Coffeyville		1–2–1	6th	
1953	Coffeyville		4–2	T–1st	
1954	Coffeyville		6–1	1st	
1955	Coffeyville		6–2	T–2nd	
1956	Coffeyville	11–0–1	8–0	1st	W National Bowl
Coffeyville:			38–7–2		
Total:					
National championship Conference title Conference division title or championship game berth
