= Texas Eastern Conference =

The Texas Eastern Conference (TEC) is a junior college athletic conference with member schools located in Texas. The conference was founded in 1958 with four charter members: Kilgore College, Paris Junior College, Texarkana College, and Tyler Junior College. Kilgore joined after having been a member of the Longhorn Conference and then briefly aligned with the Pioneer Conference. Henderson County Junior College—now known as Trinity Valley Community College—was added to the conference in late 1959, in time to compete in the basketball season that winter. Lon Morris College, which did not have a football team, joined as the TEC's sixth member just after the new year in 1960, also in time for the basketball season. Jacksonville Baptist College—now known as Jacksonville College—joined as the TEC's seventh member in the fall of 1960.

In 1964, the Texas Junior College Football Federation (TJCFF)—now known as the Southwest Junior College Football Conference (SWJCFC)—was formed to sponsor only football. All four members of the TEC that still had a football program—Henderson County, Kilgore, Texarkana, and Tyler—joined the TJCFF, but remained TEC members for all other sports.

== Yearly football standings ==
1958 Texas Eastern Conference football standings
	Conf.					Overall
Team	W		L		T	W		L		T
Texarkana +	2	–	1	–	0	9	–	1	–	0
Tyler +	2	–	1	–	0	9	–	2	–	0
Kilgore +	2	–	1	–	0	6	–	3	–	0
Paris	0	–	3	–	0	3	–	5	–	1
+ – Conference co-champions

1961 Texas Eastern Conference football standings
	Conf.					Overall
Team	W		L		T	W		L		T
Tyler $	7	–	1	–	0	8	–	1	–	0
Kilgore	5	–	3	–	0	7	–	3	–	0
Henderson County	5	–	3	–	0	7	–	4	–	0
Paris	3	–	5	–	0	5	–	5	–	0
Texarkana	0	–	8	–	0	0	–	9	–	0
$ – Conference champion

1959 Texas Eastern Conference football standings
	Conf.					Overall
Team	W		L		T	W		L		T
Texarkana $	3	–	0	–	0	8	–	3	–	0
Kilgore	2	–	1	–	0	7	–	2	–	1
Paris	1	–	2	–	0	3	–	6	–	0
Tyler	0	–	3	–	0	4	–	4	–	1
$ – Conference champion

1962 Texas Eastern Conference football standings
	Conf.					Overall
Team	W		L		T	W		L		T
Henderson County $	4	–	1	–	1	9	–	1	–	1
Tyler	3	–	3	–	0	6	–	5	–	0
Kilgore	2	–	3	–	1	4	–	5	–	1
Texarkana	2	–	4	–	0	3	–	4	–	1
$ – Conference champion

1960 Texas Eastern Conference football standings
	Conf.					Overall
Team	W		L		T	W		L		T
Tyler $	8	–	0	–	0	12	–	1	–	0
Paris	4	–	4	–	0	6	–	4	–	0
Henderson County	4	–	4	–	0	6	–	5	–	0
Texarkana	4	–	4	–	0	6	–	5	–	0
Kilgore	0	–	8	–	0	1	–	9	–	0
$ – Conference champion

1963 Texas Eastern Conference football standings
	Conf.					Overall
Team	W		L		T	W		L		T
Tyler $	5	–	1	–	0	7	–	3	–	0
Texarkana	4	–	2	–	0	7	–	4	–	0
Henderson County	2	–	4	–	0	4	–	6	–	0
Kilgore	1	–	5	–	0	2	–	8	–	0
$ – Conference champion
