= Arizona Western College =

Community college in Yuma, Arizona, U.S.

- Other name: AWC
- Type: Public community college
- Established: 1963; 63 years ago
- Budget: $88 million (2019)
- President: Daniel P. Corr
- Academic staff: 378
- Students: 11,492 (2017–18)
- Location: Yuma, Arizona, United States; 32°41′21″N 114°29′46″W
- Campus: Suburban
- Colors: Red and Turquoise
- Nickname: Matadors
- Sporting affiliations: National Junior College Athletic Association, Arizona Community College Athletic Conference
- Mascot: Mateo the Matador Andale the Bull
- Website: www.azwestern.edu

Arizona Western College (AWC) is a public community college in Yuma, Arizona. It offers associate degrees, occupational certificates, and transfer degrees. AWC also offers classes in Dateland, Parker, San Luis, Somerton, and Wellton.

== Academics ==
Arizona Western College offers over 100 degrees and certificates in person and online. Its associate degrees include: Arts (AA), Science (AS), Business (ABus) and Applied Science (AAS).

== On-campus housing ==
Arizona Western College is one of the few community colleges in the United States to offer on-campus housing. The main campus has three residence halls that house up to 348 residents.

== Student life ==
AWC has more than 50 clubs and organizations for those interested in math, music, athletics, cooking and chess.

== Athletics ==
AWC's athletic teams compete in the National Junior College Athletic Association (NJCAA) and the Arizona Community College Athletic Conference (ACCAC) and are collectively known as the Matadors. They competed in the Western States Football League (WSFL) until 2018, when changes in football programs in nearby colleges prohibited them from participating in this League.

The Arizona Western College Matadors field eight intercollegiate teams, four for men and four for women. Men's sports at Arizona Western include baseball, basketball, and soccer. The Matador women compete in basketball, soccer, softball, and volleyball. The basketball and baseball teams have produced numerous professional athletes like Leonard Thompson, Crawford Ker, Rafael Araujo, Bengie Molina, Sergio Romo, Randy Gregory, and Nate Archibald. In 2014, the Matadors football team won the El Toro Bowl to finish the season with an 11 - 1 record. The football program was discontinued in 2018.

== Notable alumni ==
- Rafael Araujo, professional basketball player
- Nate Archibald, professional basketball player
- Randy Gregory, professional American football player
- Crawford Ker, professional American football player
- Yaxel Lendeborg, professional basketball player
- Bengie Molina, professional baseball player
- Sergio Romo, professional baseball player
- Leonard Thompson, professional American football player
- Jesse Williams, professional American football player
- Cameron Young, professional basketball player
- Damien Williams, professional American football player
