= Arizona Community College Athletic Conference =

Junior college sports conference

- Association: NJCAA
- Founded: 1964; 62 years ago
- Sports fielded: 22; men's: 12; women's: 10
- Division: Region 1
- No. of teams: 19 (18 in 2027)
- Headquarters: Yuma, Arizona
- Region: Arizona, Nevada
- Website: accac.org

Locations

The Arizona Community College Athletic Conference (ACCAC) is a junior college conference in Region 1 of the National Junior College Athletic Association (NJCAA). Conference championships are held in most sports and individuals can be named to All-Conference and All-Academic teams. The conference was formed in 1964 as the Arizona Junior College Athletic Conference (AJCAC).

== Member schools ==
=== Current members ===
The ACCAC currently has 19 full members, all are public schools:

| Institution | Location | Founded | Affiliation | Enrollment | Nickname | Joined |
|---|---|---|---|---|---|---|
| Arizona Western College | Yuma, AZ | 1963 | Public | 11,492 | Matadors | ? |
| Central Arizona College | Coolidge, AZ | 1961 | Public | 12,239 | Vaqueros | ? |
| Chandler-Gilbert Community College | Chandler, AZ | 1992 | Public (Note: Part of the Maricopa County Community College District.) | 14,728 | Coyotes | ? |
| Cochise College | Douglas, AZ | 1964 | Public | 7,983 | Apaches | ? |
| Coconino County Community College | Flagstaff, AZ | 1991 | Public | 3,515 | Running Comets | ? |
| Eastern Arizona College | Thatcher, AZ | 1888 | Public | 6,423 | Gila Monsters | ? |
| Estrella Mountain Community College | Avondale, AZ | 1992 | Public | 15,000 | Mountain Lions | ? |
| GateWay Community College | Phoenix, AZ | 1968 | Public | 16,000 | Geckos | ? |
| Glendale Community College | Glendale, AZ | 1965 | Public | 19,133 | Gauchos | ? |
| Mesa Community College | Mesa, AZ | 1965 | Public | 25,960 | Thunderbirds | ? |
| Mohave Community College | Kingman, AZ | 1970 | Public | 6,100 | Bighorns | ? |
| Paradise Valley Community College | Phoenix, AZ | 1985 | Public | 9,000 | Pumas | ? |
| Phoenix College | Phoenix, AZ | 1920 | Public | 12,000 | Bears | ? |
| Pima Community College | Tucson, AZ | 1969 | Public | 75,039 | Aztecs | ? |
| Scottsdale Community College | Scottsdale, AZ | 1970 | Public | 10,000 | Fighting Artichokes | ? |
| South Mountain Community College | Phoenix, AZ | 1978 | Public | 9,000 | Cougars | ? |
| College of Southern Nevada | Las Vegas, NV | 1971 | Public | 35,000 | Coyotes | 2023 |
| Tohono Oʼodham Community College | Sells, AZ | 1998 | Public (Note: Also a tribal college.) | 200 | Jegos | ? |
| Yavapai College | Prescott, AZ | 1965 | Public | 11,616 | Roughriders | ? |

== Sports ==
Teams in Arizona Community College Athletic Conference competition
| Sport | Men's | Women's |
|---|---|---|
| Baseball | 15 | — |
| Basketball | 13 | 12 |
| Cross country | 10 | 10 |
| Golf | 8 | 7 |
| Soccer | 13 | 15 |
| Softball | — | 14 |
| Tennis | 4 | 5 |
| Track and field | 6 | 5 |
| Volleyball | — | 11 |

=== Men's sponsored sports by school ===
| School | Baseball | Basketball | Cross Country | Golf | Soccer | Tennis | Track & Field | Total |
|---|---|---|---|---|---|---|---|---|
| Arizona Western College | ✓ | ✓ | ✗ | ✗ | ✓ | ✗ | ✗ | 3 |
| Central Arizona College | ✓ | ✓ | ✓ | ✗ | ✗ | ✗ | ✓ | 4 |
| Chandler-Gilbert Community College | ✓ | ✓ | ✗ | ✓ | ✓ | ✗ | ✗ | 4 |
| Cochise College | ✓ | ✓ | ✗ | ✗ | ✗ | ✗ | ✗ | 2 |
| Coconino Community College | ✗ | ✗ | ✓ | ✗ | ✗ | ✗ | ✗ | 1 |
| Eastern Arizona College | ✓ | ✓ | ✗ | ✓ | ✗ | ✗ | ✗ | 3 |
| Estrella Mountain Community College | ✗ | ✗ | ✓ | ✓ | ✗ | ✗ | ✗ | 2 |
| GateWay Community College | ✓ | ✗ | ✗ | ✗ | ✓ | ✗ | ✗ | 2 |
| Glendale Community College | ✓ | ✓ | ✓ | ✓ | ✓ | ✓ | ✓ | 7 |
| Mesa Community College | ✓ | ✓ | ✓ | ✓ | ✓ | ✓ | ✓ | 7 |
| Mohave Community College | ✗ | ✗ | ✗ | ✗ | ✓ | ✗ | ✗ | 1 |
| Paradise Valley Community College | ✓ | ✗ | ✓ | ✓ | ✓ | ✓ | ✓ | 6 |
| Phoenix College | ✓ | ✓ | ✓ | ✗ | ✓ | ✗ | ✓ | 5 |
| Pima Community College | ✓ | ✓ | ✓ | ✓ | ✓ | ✓ | ✓ | 7 |
| Scottsdale Community College | ✓ | ✓ | ✗ | ✗ | ✓ | ✗ | ✗ | 3 |
| South Mountain Community College | ✓ | ✓ | ✗ | ✓ | ✓ | ✗ | ✗ | 4 |
| College of Southern Nevada | ✓ | ✓ | ✓ | ✗ | ✓ | ✗ | ✗ | 4 |
| Tohono O'odham Community College | ✗ | ✗ | ✓ | ✗ | ✗ | ✗ | ✗ | 1 |
| Yavapai College | ✓ | ✓ | ✗ | ✗ | ✓ | ✗ | ✗ | 3 |
| Totals | 15 | 13 | 10 | 8 | 13 | 4 | 6 | 69 |

Men's varsity sports not sponsored by the Arizona Community College Athletic Conference that are played by schools
| School | Rodeo | Volleyball | eSports |
|---|---|---|---|
| Central Arizona College | Yes | | |
| Cochise College | Yes | | |
| South Mountain Community College | | Yes | |
| Yavapai College | | | Yes |

=== Women's sponsored sports by school ===
| School | Basketball | Cross Country | Golf | Soccer | Softball | Tennis | Track & Field | Volleyball | Total |
|---|---|---|---|---|---|---|---|---|---|
| Arizona Western College | ✓ | ✗ | ✗ | ✓ | ✓ | ✗ | ✗ | ✓ | 4 |
| Central Arizona College | ✓ | ✓ | ✓ | ✗ | ✓ | ✗ | ✓ | ✗ | 5 |
| Chandler-Gilbert Community College | ✓ | ✗ | ✓ | ✓ | ✓ | ✗ | ✗ | ✓ | 5 |
| Cochise College | ✓ | ✗ | ✗ | ✓ | ✗ | ✗ | ✗ | ✗ | 2 |
| Coconino Community College | ✗ | ✓ | ✗ | ✗ | ✗ | ✗ | ✗ | ✗ | 1 |
| Eastern Arizona College | ✓ | ✗ | ✗ | ✓ | ✓ | ✗ | ✓ | ✓ | 5 |
| Estrella Mountain Community College | ✗ | ✓ | ✓ | ✗ | ✗ | ✗ | ✗ | ✗ | 2 |
| GateWay Community College | ✗ | ✗ | ✗ | ✓ | ✓ | ✗ | ✗ | ✗ | 2 |
| Glendale Community College | ✓ | ✓ | ✗ | ✓ | ✓ | ✓ | ✓ | ✓ | 7 |
| Mesa Community College | ✓ | ✓ | ✓ | ✓ | ✓ | ✓ | ✓ | ✓ | 8 |
| Mohave Community College | ✗ | ✗ | ✗ | ✓ | ✗ | ✗ | ✗ | ✗ | 1 |
| Paradise Valley Community College | ✗ | ✓ | ✓ | ✓ | ✓ | ✓ | ✓ | ✗ | 6 |
| Phoenix College | ✓ | ✓ | ✗ | ✓ | ✓ | ✗ | ✓ | ✓ | 6 |
| Pima Community College | ✓ | ✓ | ✓ | ✓ | ✓ | ✓ | ✓ | ✓ | 8 |
| Scottsdale Community College | ✓ | ✗ | ✗ | ✓ | ✓ | ✗ | ✗ | ✓ | 4 |
| South Mountain Community College | ✓ | ✗ | ✓ | ✓ | ✓ | ✗ | ✗ | ✓ | 5 |
| College of Southern Nevada | ✓ | ✓ | ✗ | ✓ | ✓ | ✗ | ✗ | ✓ | 5 |
| Tohono O'odham Community College | ✗ | ✓ | ✗ | ✗ | ✗ | ✗ | ✗ | ✗ | 1 |
| Yavapai College | ✗ | ✗ | ✗ | ✓ | ✓ | ✗ | ✗ | ✓ | 3 |
| Totals | 12 | 10 | 7 | 15 | 14 | 5 | 5 | 11 | 79 |

Notes

Women's varsity not sponsored by the Arizona Community College Athletic Conference that are played by schools

| School | Rodeo | Beach Volleyball | eSports |
|---|---|---|---|
| Central Arizona College | Yes | | |
| Cochise College | Yes | | |
| Mesa Community College | | Yes | |
| South Mountain Community College | | Yes | |
| Yavapai College | | | Yes |

== NJCAA national titles ==
| Institution | Total | Men's | Women's | Co-ed | Titles |
|---|---|---|---|---|---|
| Central Arizona College | 41 | 16 | 25 | 0 | Baseball (4), Men's Cross Country (8), Men's Outdoor Track and Field (4), Women's Basketball (3), Women's Cross Country (2), Softball (12), Women's Outdoor Track & Field (5), Volleyball (1), Women's Rodeo (2) |
| Phoenix College | 26 | 12 | 14 | 0 | Baseball (3), Men's Basketball (1), Men's Golf (1), Men's Outdoor Track & Field (3), Wrestling (2), Football (1), Women's Cross Country (1), Softball (11), Men's Soccer (1), Women's Soccer (2) |
| Mesa Community College | 22 | 16 | 6 | 0 | Baseball (4), Women's Cross Country (2), Men's Golf (1), Men's Tennis (1), Men's Indoor Track & Field (1), Men's Outdoor Track & Field (7), Football (2), Volleyball (2), Women's Basketball (1), Women's Outdoor Track & Field (1) |
| Yavapai College | 15 | 11 | 4 | 0 | Baseball (4), Men's Soccer (7), Women's Cross Country (2), Softball (2) |
| Scottsdale Community College | 15 | 10 | 5 | 0 | Men's Golf (10), Volleyball (5) |
| Paradise Valley Community College | 13 | 4 | 9 | 0 | Men's Cross Country (4), Women's Cross Country (6), Women's Soccer (3) |
| Glendale Community College | 9 | 7 | 2 | 0 | Baseball (1), Men's Cross Country (1), Football (3), Men's Golf (1), Judo (1), Softball (1), Volleyball (1) |
| South Mountain Community College | 8 | 8 | 0 | 0 | Men's Golf (8) |
| Pima Community College | 8 | 3 | 5 | 0 | Women's Basketball (1), Men's Soccer (2), Men's Cross Country (1), Softball (2), Women's Tennis (2) |
| Arizona Western College | 3 | 1 | 2 | 0 | Softball (2), Football (1) |
| Eastern Arizona College | 2 | 0 | 2 | 0 | Women's Basketball (1), Volleyball (1) |
| Total | 162 | 88 | 74 | 0 | |

== Football standings ==
1965 Arizona Junior College Athletic Conference football standings
| | Conf. | | | | | Overall |
| Team | W | | L | | T | W | | L | | T |
|---|---|---|---|---|---|---|---|---|---|---|
| Phoenix $ | 2 | – | 0 | – | 0 | 3 | – | 5 | – | 0 |
| Arizona Western | 1 | – | 1 | – | 0 | 8 | – | 1 | – | 0 |
| Eastern Arizona | 0 | – | 2 | – | 0 | 1 | – | 7 | – | 1 |
$ – Conference champion

1966 Arizona Junior College Athletic Conference football standings
| | Conf. | | | | | Overall |
| Team | W | | L | | T | W | | L | | T |
|---|---|---|---|---|---|---|---|---|---|---|
| Phoenix $ | 1 | – | 0 | – | 1 | 6 | – | 2 | – | 1 |
| Eastern Arizona | 1 | – | 1 | – | 0 | 5 | – | 4 | – | 0 |
| Arizona Western | 0 | – | 1 | – | 1 | 7 | – | 2 | – | 1 |
$ – Conference champion

1967 Arizona Junior College Athletic Conference football standings
| | Conf. | | | | | Overall |
| Team | W | | L | | T | W | | L | | T |
|---|---|---|---|---|---|---|---|---|---|---|
| Arizona Western $ | 4 | – | 0 | – | 0 | 9 | – | 2 | – | 0 |
| Phoenix | 3 | – | 1 | – | 0 | 6 | – | 4 | – | 0 |
| Eastern Arizona | 1 | – | 3 | – | 0 | 4 | – | 5 | – | 0 |
| Glendale (AZ) | 1 | – | 3 | – | 0 | 3 | – | 5 | – | 1 |
| Mesa (AZ) | 1 | – | 3 | – | 0 | 2 | – | 7 | – | 0 |
$ – Conference champion

1968 Arizona Junior College Athletic Conference football standings
| | Conf. | | | | | Overall |
| Team | W | | L | | T | W | | L | | T |
|---|---|---|---|---|---|---|---|---|---|---|
| Phoenix $ | 4 | – | 0 | – | 0 | 8 | – | 2 | – | 0 |
| Arizona Western | 3 | – | 1 | – | 0 | 8 | – | 2 | – | 0 |
| Eastern Arizona | 1 | – | 3 | – | 0 | 4 | – | 5 | – | 0 |
| Glendale (AZ) | 1 | – | 3 | – | 0 | 4 | – | 5 | – | 0 |
| Mesa (AZ) | 1 | – | 3 | – | 0 | 4 | – | 5 | – | 0 |
$ – Conference champion

1969 Arizona Junior College Athletic Conference football standings
| | Conf. | | | | | Overall |
| Team | W | | L | | T | W | | L | | T |
|---|---|---|---|---|---|---|---|---|---|---|
| Arizona Western $ | 4 | – | 0 | – | 0 | 9 | – | 1 | – | 0 |
| Eastern Arizona | 3 | – | 1 | – | 0 | 5 | – | 3 | – | 0 |
| Phoenix | 1 | – | 3 | – | 0 | 4 | – | 5 | – | 1 |
| Glendale (AZ) | 1 | – | 3 | – | 0 | 4 | – | 5 | – | 0 |
| Mesa (AZ) | 1 | – | 3 | – | 0 | 3 | – | 6 | – | 0 |
$ – Conference champion

1970 Arizona Junior College Athletic Conference football standings
| | Conf. | | | | | Overall |
| Team | W | | L | | T | W | | L | | T |
|---|---|---|---|---|---|---|---|---|---|---|
| Mesa (AZ) $ | 4 | – | 0 | – | 0 | 10 | – | 1 | – | 0 |
| Arizona Western | 3 | – | 1 | – | 0 | 9 | – | 1 | – | 0 |
| Phoenix | 2 | – | 2 | – | 0 | 5 | – | 4 | – | 0 |
| Eastern Arizona | 1 | – | 3 | – | 0 | 4 | – | 5 | – | 0 |
| Glendale (AZ) | 0 | – | 4 | – | 0 | 1 | – | 8 | – | 0 |
$ – Conference champion

1971 Arizona Junior College Athletic Conference football standings
| | Conf. | | | | | Overall |
| Team | W | | L | | T | W | | L | | T |
|---|---|---|---|---|---|---|---|---|---|---|
| Arizona Western $ | 4 | – | 0 | – | 0 | 9 | – | 1 | – | 0 |
| Phoenix | 3 | – | 1 | – | 0 | 9 | – | 1 | – | 0 |
| Mesa (AZ) | 2 | – | 2 | – | 0 | 7 | – | 2 | – | 0 |
| Glendale (AZ) | 1 | – | 3 | – | 0 | 3 | – | 6 | – | 0 |
| Eastern Arizona | 0 | – | 4 | – | 0 | 2 | – | 6 | – | 0 |
$ – Conference champion

1972 Arizona Junior College Athletic Conference football standings
| | Conf. | | | | | Overall |
| Team | W | | L | | T | W | | L | | T |
|---|---|---|---|---|---|---|---|---|---|---|
| Arizona Western $ | 4 | – | 0 | – | 0 | 10 | – | 0 | – | 0 |
| Phoenix | 3 | – | 1 | – | 0 | 7 | – | 1 | – | 1 |
| Mesa (AZ) | 2 | – | 2 | – | 0 | 8 | – | 2 | – | 0 |
| Eastern Arizona | 1 | – | 3 | – | 0 | 4 | – | 5 | – | 0 |
| Glendale (AZ) | 0 | – | 4 | – | 0 | 1 | – | 8 | – | 0 |
$ – Conference champion

1973 Arizona Community College Athletic Conference football standings
| | Conf. | | | | | Overall |
| Team | W | | L | | T | W | | L | | T |
|---|---|---|---|---|---|---|---|---|---|---|
| Mesa (AZ) $ | 5 | – | 0 | – | 0 | 10 | – | 0 | – | 0 |
| Eastern Arizona | 4 | – | 1 | – | 0 | 6 | – | 3 | – | 0 |
| Phoenix | 3 | – | 2 | – | 0 | 7 | – | 3 | – | 0 |
| Glendale (AZ) | 1 | – | 4 | – | 0 | 5 | – | 5 | – | 0 |
| Arizona Western | 1 | – | 4 | – | 0 | 3 | – | 6 | – | 0 |
| Scottsdale | 1 | – | 4 | – | 0 | 1 | – | 7 | – | 1 |
$ – Conference champion; Scottsdale forfeited a non-conference win over Snow and non-conference tie with Dixie because of ineligible players.

1973 Arizona Community College Athletic Conference football standings
| | Conf. | | | | | Overall |
| Team | W | | L | | T | W | | L | | T |
|---|---|---|---|---|---|---|---|---|---|---|
| Mesa (AZ) $ | 5 | – | 0 | – | 0 | 10 | – | 0 | – | 0 |
| Eastern Arizona | 4 | – | 1 | – | 0 | 6 | – | 3 | – | 0 |
| Phoenix | 3 | – | 2 | – | 0 | 7 | – | 3 | – | 0 |
| Glendale (AZ) | 1 | – | 4 | – | 0 | 5 | – | 5 | – | 0 |
| Arizona Western | 1 | – | 4 | – | 0 | 3 | – | 6 | – | 0 |
| Scottsdale | 1 | – | 4 | – | 0 | 1 | – | 7 | – | 1 |
$ – Conference champion; Scottsdale forfeited a non-conference win over Snow and non-conference tie with Dixie because of ineligible players.

1974 Arizona Community College Athletic Conference football standings
| | Conf. | | | | | Overall |
| Team | W | | L | | T | W | | L | | T |
|---|---|---|---|---|---|---|---|---|---|---|
| Mesa (AZ) $ | 4 | – | 1 | – | 0 | 9 | – | 1 | – | 0 |
| Phoenix | 3 | – | 2 | – | 0 | 7 | – | 2 | – | 0 |
| Scottsdale | 3 | – | 2 | – | 0 | 6 | – | 3 | – | 0 |
| Glendale (AZ) | 3 | – | 2 | – | 0 | 6 | – | 4 | – | 0 |
| Eastern Arizona | 2 | – | 3 | – | 0 | 3 | – | 6 | – | 0 |
| Arizona Western | 0 | – | 5 | – | 0 | 0 | – | 10 | – | 0 |
$ – Conference champion

1975 Arizona Community College Athletic Conference football standings
| | Conf. | | | | | Overall |
| Team | W | | L | | T | W | | L | | T |
|---|---|---|---|---|---|---|---|---|---|---|
| Mesa (AZ) $ | 5 | – | 0 | – | 0 | 9 | – | 0 | – | 0 |
| Phoenix | 3 | – | 2 | – | 0 | 6 | – | 3 | – | 0 |
| Arizona Western | 3 | – | 2 | – | 0 | 4 | – | 5 | – | 0 |
| Scottsdale | 2 | – | 3 | – | 0 | 6 | – | 4 | – | 0 |
| Glendale (AZ) | 1 | – | 4 | – | 0 | 2 | – | 7 | – | 0 |
| Eastern Arizona | 1 | – | 4 | – | 0 | 1 | – | 8 | – | 0 |
$ – Conference champion

1976 Arizona Community College Athletic Conference football standings
| | Conf. | | | | | Overall |
| Team | W | | L | | T | W | | L | | T |
|---|---|---|---|---|---|---|---|---|---|---|
| Mesa (AZ) $ | 4 | – | 0 | – | 1 | 9 | – | 1 | – | 1 |
| Arizona Western | 3 | – | 1 | – | 1 | 6 | – | 2 | – | 2 |
| Phoenix | 3 | – | 2 | – | 0 | 6 | – | 3 | – | 0 |
| Scottsdale | 3 | – | 2 | – | 0 | 5 | – | 5 | – | 0 |
| Eastern Arizona | 1 | – | 4 | – | 0 | 3 | – | 6 | – | 0 |
| Glendale (AZ) | 0 | – | 5 | – | 0 | 0 | – | 9 | – | 0 |
$ – Conference champion

1977 Arizona Community College Athletic Conference football standings
| | Conf. | | | | | Overall |
| Team | W | | L | | T | W | | L | | T |
|---|---|---|---|---|---|---|---|---|---|---|
| Scottsdale $ | 5 | – | 0 | – | 0 | 6 | – | 3 | – | 0 |
| Mesa (AZ) | 4 | – | 1 | – | 0 | 7 | – | 1 | – | 1 |
| Phoenix | 3 | – | 2 | – | 0 | 8 | – | 2 | – | 0 |
| Arizona Western | 2 | – | 3 | – | 0 | 5 | – | 4 | – | 0 |
| Glendale (AZ) | 1 | – | 4 | – | 0 | 1 | – | 8 | – | 0 |
| Eastern Arizona | 0 | – | 5 | – | 0 | 1 | – | 7 | – | 0 |
$ – Conference champion

1978 Arizona Community College Athletic Conference football standings
| | Conf. | | | | | Overall |
| Team | W | | L | | T | W | | L | | T |
|---|---|---|---|---|---|---|---|---|---|---|
| Phoenix $ | 5 | – | 0 | – | 0 | 8 | – | 0 | – | 3 |
| Arizona Western | 4 | – | 1 | – | 0 | 6 | – | 3 | – | 0 |
| Mesa (AZ) | 3 | – | 2 | – | 0 | 7 | – | 3 | – | 0 |
| Scottsdale | 2 | – | 3 | – | 0 | 5 | – | 5 | – | 0 |
| Eastern Arizona | 1 | – | 4 | – | 0 | 2 | – | 7 | – | 0 |
| Glendale (AZ) | 0 | – | 5 | – | 0 | 2 | – | 8 | – | 0 |
$ – Conference champion

1979 Arizona Community College Athletic Conference football standings
| | Conf. | | | | | Overall |
| Team | W | | L | | T | W | | L | | T |
|---|---|---|---|---|---|---|---|---|---|---|
| Scottsdale $ | 5 | – | 0 | – | 0 | 8 | – | 2 | – | 1 |
| Mesa (AZ) | 3 | – | 2 | – | 0 | 7 | – | 3 | – | 0 |
| Phoenix | 3 | – | 2 | – | 0 | 6 | – | 3 | – | 0 |
| Arizona Western | 2 | – | 3 | – | 0 | 4 | – | 5 | – | 0 |
| Glendale (AZ) | 1 | – | 4 | – | 0 | 4 | – | 6 | – | 0 |
| Eastern Arizona | 1 | – | 4 | – | 0 | 3 | – | 6 | – | 0 |
$ – Conference champion

1980 Arizona Community College Athletic Conference football standings
| | Conf. | | | | | Overall |
| Team | W | | L | | T | W | | L | | T |
|---|---|---|---|---|---|---|---|---|---|---|
| Scottsdale + | 3 | – | 1 | – | 1 | 7 | – | 1 | – | 1 |
| Arizona Western + | 3 | – | 1 | – | 1 | 7 | – | 3 | – | 1 |
| Phoenix | 3 | – | 2 | – | 0 | 7 | – | 3 | – | 0 |
| Mesa (AZ) | 2 | – | 3 | – | 0 | 3 | – | 5 | – | 1 |
| Glendale (AZ) | 1 | – | 3 | – | 1 | 3 | – | 5 | – | 1 |
| Eastern Arizona | 1 | – | 3 | – | 1 | 5 | – | 4 | – | 1 |
+ – Conference co-champions

1981 Arizona Community College Athletic Conference football standings
| | Conf. | | | | | Overall |
| Team | W | | L | | T | W | | L | | T |
|---|---|---|---|---|---|---|---|---|---|---|
| Arizona Western $ | 4 | – | 0 | – | 1 | 8 | – | 1 | – | 1 |
| Mesa (AZ) | 3 | – | 2 | – | 0 | 4 | – | 5 | – | 0 |
| Glendale (AZ) | 2 | – | 2 | – | 1 | 5 | – | 3 | – | 1 |
| Scottsdale | 2 | – | 3 | – | 0 | 5 | – | 3 | – | 1 |
| Phoenix | 2 | – | 3 | – | 0 | 3 | – | 5 | – | 0 |
| Eastern Arizona | 1 | – | 4 | – | 0 | 2 | – | 7 | – | 0 |
$ – Conference champion

1982 Arizona Community College Athletic Conference football standings
| | Conf. | | | | | Overall |
| Team | W | | L | | T | W | | L | | T |
|---|---|---|---|---|---|---|---|---|---|---|
| Glendale (AZ) + | 4 | – | 1 | – | 0 | 8 | – | 2 | – | 0 |
| Phoenix + | 4 | – | 1 | – | 0 | 7 | – | 2 | – | 0 |
| Scottsdale + | 4 | – | 1 | – | 0 | 7 | – | 2 | – | 0 |
| Mesa (AZ) | 2 | – | 3 | – | 0 | 4 | – | 5 | – | 0 |
| Arizona Western | 1 | – | 4 | – | 0 | 6 | – | 4 | – | 0 |
| Eastern Arizona | 0 | – | 5 | – | 0 | 3 | – | 7 | – | 0 |
+ – Conference co-champions

1983 Arizona Community College Athletic Conference football standings
| | Conf. | | | | | Overall |
| Team | W | | L | | T | W | | L | | T |
|---|---|---|---|---|---|---|---|---|---|---|
| Glendale (AZ) + | 3 | – | 1 | – | 1 | 5 | – | 3 | – | 1 |
| Phoenix + | 3 | – | 1 | – | 1 | 5 | – | 4 | – | 1 |
| Scottsdale | 3 | – | 2 | – | 0 | 7 | – | 2 | – | 0 |
| Eastern Arizona | 3 | – | 2 | – | 0 | 4 | – | 5 | – | 0 |
| Mesa (AZ) | 2 | – | 3 | – | 0 | 4 | – | 5 | – | 0 |
| Arizona Western | 0 | – | 5 | – | 0 | 3 | – | 6 | – | 0 |
+ – Conference co-champions

1984 Arizona Community College Athletic Conference football standings
| | Conf. | | | | | Overall |
| Team | W | | L | | T | W | | L | | T |
|---|---|---|---|---|---|---|---|---|---|---|
| Phoenix $ | 4 | – | 1 | – | 0 | 9 | – | 1 | – | 0 |
| Glendale (AZ) | 3 | – | 2 | – | 0 | 6 | – | 2 | – | 1 |
| Mesa (AZ) | 3 | – | 2 | – | 0 | 6 | – | 3 | – | 0 |
| Scottsdale | 3 | – | 2 | – | 0 | 5 | – | 4 | – | 0 |
| Arizona Western | 1 | – | 4 | – | 0 | 3 | – | 6 | – | 0 |
| Eastern Arizona | 1 | – | 4 | – | 0 | 2 | – | 7 | – | 0 |
$ – Conference champion
