= Butler Grizzlies =

Sports teams of Butler Community College, Kansas

- University: Butler Community College
- Nickname: Grizzlies
- Association: NJCAA
- Conference: Kansas Jayhawk Community College Conference
- Athletic director: Mike Helmer
- Location: El Dorado, Kansas
- Varsity teams: 10
- Football stadium: BG Products Veterans Sports Complex
- Basketball arena: Power Plant Gymnasium
- Baseball stadium: McDonald Baseball Stadium
- Softball stadium: East Park Softball Complex
- Soccer stadium: Butler Soccer Field
- Colors: Purple and gold
- Website: www.butlergrizzlies.com

The Butler Grizzlies are the sports teams of Butler Community College located in El Dorado, Kansas, United States. They participate in the National Junior College Athletic Association (NJCAA) and in the Kansas Jayhawk Community College Conference.

== Sports ==
Men's sports

- Baseball
- Basketball
- Cross country
- Football
- Track & field

Women's sports

- Basketball
- Cross country
- Soccer
- Softball
- Track & field
- Volleyball

== Facilities ==
Butler Community College has five athletics facilities.

- BG Products Veterans Sports Complex – home of the Grizzlies football team
- Butler Soccer Field – home of the Lady Grizzlies soccer team
- East Park Softball – home of the Grizzlies softball team
- McDonald Baseball Stadium – home of the Grizzlies baseball team
- Power Plant Gymnasium – home of the Grizzlies men's and women's basketball, and volleyball teams

== Records ==
Butler Softball has currently won 88 consecutive games, dating back to March 3, 2016, when the Grizzlies beat Barton Community College 9–1. This includes the 2016 NJCAA Div. I National Championship.

Butler Football is tied for the most national championships by any junior college football program. Troy Morrell won three of those national titles (2003, 2007, 2008) before resigning with a 154–22 record in 2014. Morrell has since been inducted into both the NJCAA Hall of Fame and Kansas Sports Hall of Fame.

== National championships ==
- Football: 6 (1981, 1998, 1999, 2003, 2007, 2008)
- Basketball: 1 (1953)
- Softball: 1 (2016)
- Men's cross country: 2 (1970, 1995)
- Women's cross country: 1 (2002)

== Notable Grizzlies ==
- Tony Allen, NBA guard
- William Bartee, NFL defensive back
- Heath Bell, MLB pitcher
- Roger Bernhardt, NFL offensive guard
- Willie Blade, NFL defensive tackle
- Chris Carson, NFL running back
- Branden Dozier, CFL defensive and special teams player
- Ron Fellows, NFL cornerback
- Michael Gallup, NFL wide receiver
- Ted Gilmore, College Football and NFL Assistant Coach
- Robert Goff, NFL defensive lineman
- Jamie Holland, NFL wide receiver
- Willie Hordge, sprinter
- David Irons, NFL cornerback
- Bruce Irvin, NFL player
- Stephen Jackson, NBA basketball player
- Rudi Johnson, NFL running back
- Kwamie Lassiter, NFL cornerback
- DeMarcus Lawrence, NFL defensive end
- Betty Lennox, WNBA guard
- Elbert Mack, NFL defensive back
- Zach Mettenberger, NFL quarterback
- Sherrone Moore, former head football coach at the University of Michigan
- Kasib Powell, NBA forward
- Byron Pringle, NFL wide receiver
- Jerry Quick, NFL offensive lineman
- Damarious Randall, NFL cornerback
- Butch Reynolds, Olympian track and field athlete
- Nate Robertson, MLB pitcher
- James Robinson, NFL wide receiver
- Shaun Smith, NFL defensive lineman
- Press Taylor, NFL assistant coach
- Zac Taylor, NFL Head Coach and NFL/CFL quarterback
- Fred Torneden, long-distance runner and fastest American marathon runner in 1984
- Dave Thomas, NFL cornerback
- Mao Tosi, NFL defensive tackle (played only basketball at Butler)
- Seth Wheeler, former player and former Emporia State University coach
- Markus White, NFL linebacker
- Jonathan Wilhite, NFL cornerback
- Ivory Williams, sprinter
- Jermaine Williams, former NFL running back
