= Phoenix College =

Community college in Encanto, Phoenix, Arizona, US

- Other name: PC
- Type: Public community college
- Established: 1920; 106 years ago
- Parent institution: Maricopa County Community College District
- Academic affiliations: Space-grant
- President: Kimberly Britt
- Students: 12,000
- Location: Phoenix, Arizona, United States; 33°29′04″N 112°05′19″W
- Campus: Urban, 52 Acres
- Colors: Gold & Blue
- Nickname: Bears
- Sporting affiliations: National Junior College Athletic Association
- Mascot: Bumstead the Bear
- Website: www.phoenixcollege.edu

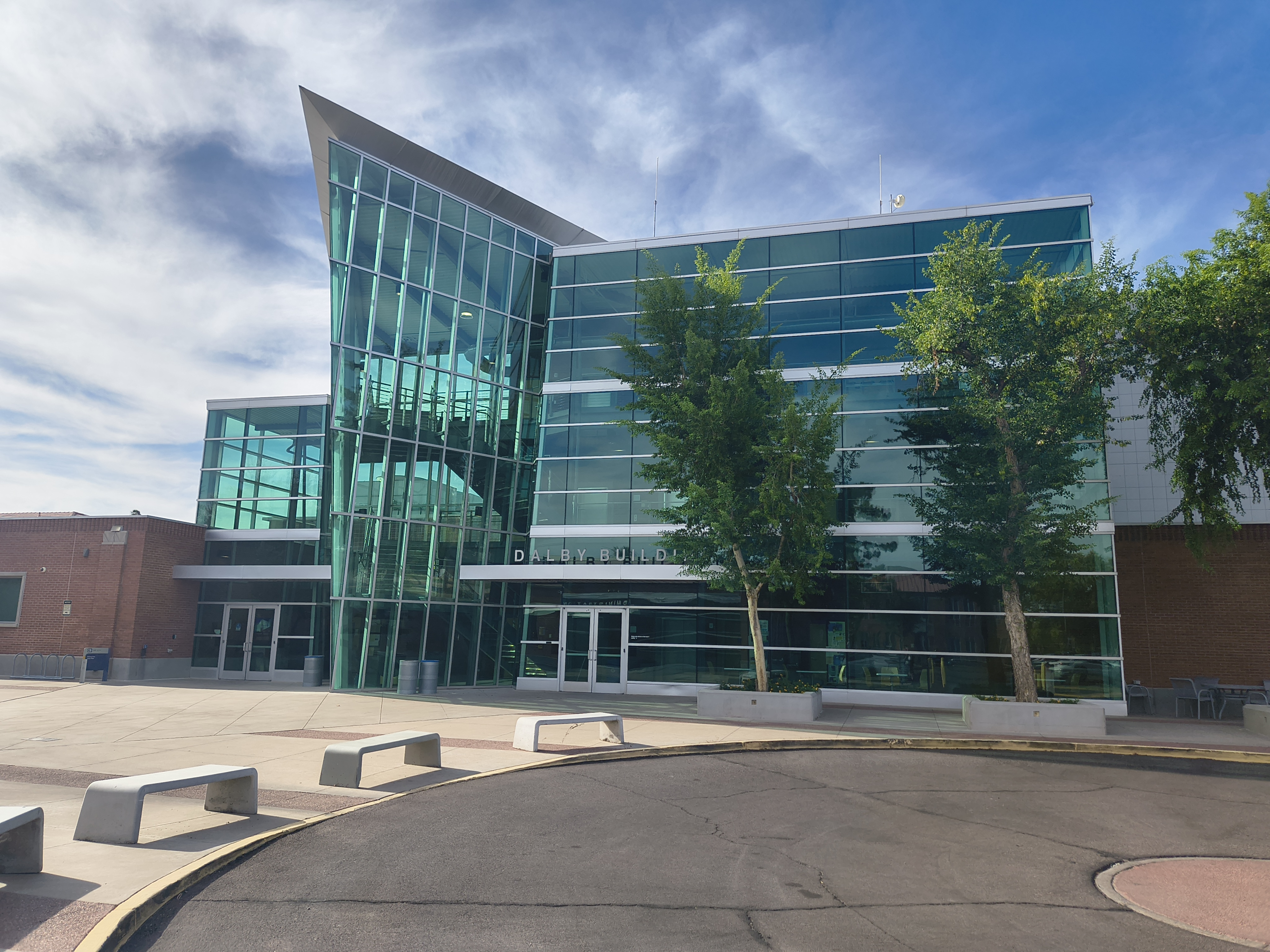
Dalby Biosciences Building

Phoenix College (PC) is a public community college in Encanto, Phoenix, Arizona, United States. Founded in 1920, it is one of the oldest community colleges in the country.

== History ==
The college was originally a part of the Phoenix Union High School and Junior College District (now Phoenix Union High School District), and was known as Phoenix Junior College (PJC). PC became a part of the Maricopa County Community College District in 1960, and is now considered the flagship campus of one of the largest community college systems in the world.

== Campus ==
Phoenix College consists of the main campus in Midtown Phoenix, as well as a downtown campus located in the central business district of Phoenix.

== Academics ==
Phoenix College offers over 200 degree and certificate programs. PC also offers training geared towards professional community/business development and general interest. PC is also home of the Student Services Institute.

== Athletics ==
Phoenix College has seven sports teams competing in the National Junior College Athletic Association (NJCAA). The women's softball team has won the NJCAA National Women's Softball Division II Championships ten times (2000, 2001, 2004–08, 2012, 2021, 2022). The school has also won NJCAA championships in Women's Soccer (2020, 2022), baseball (1960, 1962, 1965), men's track and field (1964, 1965, 1966), wrestling (1967–68, 1968–69), men's golf (1964), football (1964), and women's cross country (1985). In 1980 PC won national team championships in women's and mixed archery (two-year college division). Women's archery also won national titles in 1933 and 1934. The Maricopa Community College District elected in February 2018 to eliminate all football programs associated with its schools. Programs cut included those at Scottsdale Community College, Glendale Community College, Mesa Community College and Phoenix College's own program. In 2025, the school won their first Men's Soccer NJCAA DII National Championship.

== Notable people ==
=== Alumni ===
Alumni include two Miss Americas (1949 and 1964) and two Arizona governors (Wesley Bolin and Jack Richard Williams). Other prominent alumni include the Navajo Nation's first president Peterson Zah, film star Nick Nolte, Tony Award-winning actor Stephen Spinella, actor Peter Billingsley, daytime television star Jaime Lyn Bauer, Pop/Rhythm & Blues singer CeCe Peniston, artist Eric Fischl, Mixed Martial artists UFC veteran Homer Moore, AAGPBL pioneer Charlotte Armstrong. Investigative journalist Ron Ridenhour, who exposed the My Lai Massacre, attended Phoenix College before being drafted into military service in Vietnam in 1967. Politicians who attended the college include State Senator Juan Mendez and Democrat fund-raiser Ed Buck.

Several former football players have played in the National Football League including Fred Carr, Bob Wallace, Lyn Larsen, Damon Sheehy-Guiseppi, Tory Nixon, Andy Livingston, and "Scooter" Molander. Dennis Layton played for the National Basketball Association's Phoenix Suns and John Smith toured with the Harlem Globetrotters. Bears who have played Major League Baseball include Gary Gentry and Dave Rajsich. In Soccer, Jessica McDonald attended Phoenix College during the 2006-07 seasons.

=== Faculty ===
- John S. Goff (1931–2001), studied Robert Todd Lincoln and the history of Arizona
