= Northeastern Oklahoma A&M College =

College in Miami, Oklahoma, U.S.

Coordinates: 36°52′43″N 94°51′57″W

- Former names: Miami School of Mines (1919–1942); Northeastern Oklahoma Junior College (1942–1943)
- Type: Public community college
- Established: 1919
- Parent institution: Oklahoma Agricultural & Mechanical Colleges
- President: Kyle Stafford
- Students: 1,799 (fall 2023)
- Location: Miami, Oklahoma, U.S.
- Website: neo.edu

Northeastern Oklahoma A&M College (NEO) is a public community college in Miami, Oklahoma, United States. Established as the Miami School of Mines in 1919, NEO has an enrollment of approximately two thousand students. The Golden Norsemen is the school mascot.

== History ==
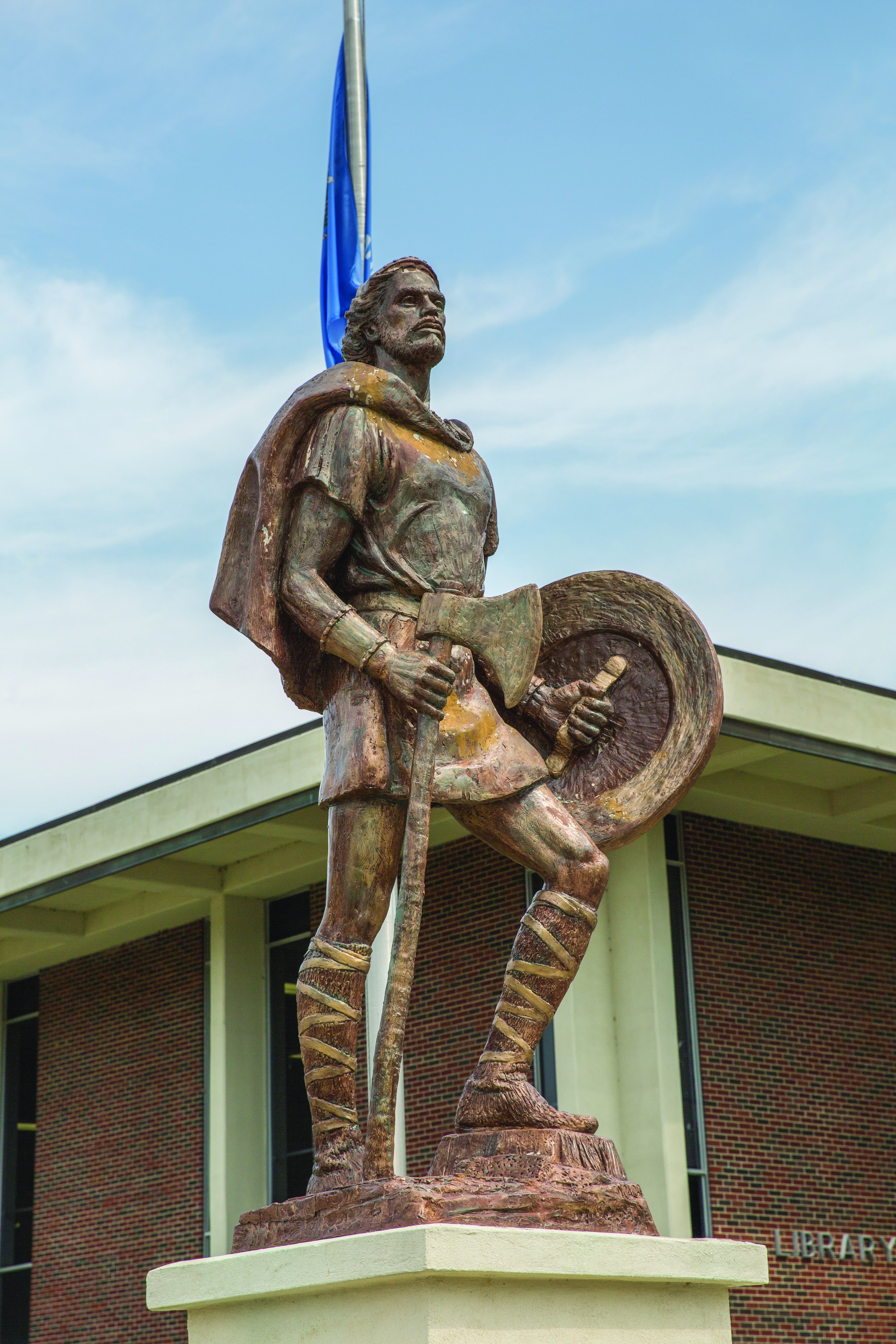
The statue of Odin, designed by alumnus Nick Calcagno, stands in front of the Bruce G. Carter Library/Administration Building on the NEO A&M College campus.

The Oklahoma Senate passed Senate Bill 225 on March 17, 1919 to establish the Miami School of Mines. The school began operations in September 1920. In 1924, the school became Northeastern Oklahoma Junior College, as mining became less important in Miami. In April 1943, the Board of Regents for the Agricultural and Mechanical Colleges gained control of the college, and the college became Northeastern Oklahoma A&M College.

== Academics ==
Northeastern Oklahoma A&M offers certificate programs and associate degrees.

== Athletics ==
Northeastern Oklahoma A&M self-identifies in athletics as "NEO", and its mascot is Golden Norsemen for men's sports and Lady Norse for women's sports. Men's sports at NEO are baseball, football, basketball, soccer, and wrestling. Women's sports are basketball, softball, soccer, and volleyball. NEO also fields agricultural sports: horseback riding, horse judging, livestock judging, and rodeo.

== Notable alumni ==
- Remi Ayodele – professional football player
- Matt Blair – professional football player
- Romby Bryant – professional football player
- Mike Butcher – professional baseball player and coach, attended NEO in 1983-1984
- Marion Butts – professional football player
- Bo Bowling, professional football player
- Scott Case – professional football player
- Charlie Clemons – professional football player
- Jason Dickson – professional baseball player, attended NEO c.1993
- Ernest Givins – professional football player
- Chuck Hoskin – Member of the Oklahoma House of Representatives
- Tony Hutson – professional football player
- Deji Karim – professional football player, attended NEO 2005-2006.
- Brandon Keith – professional football player, graduated in 2005.
- Ramón Laureano - Professional baseball player.
- Ken Lunday – professional football player
- Juqua Parker – professional football player
- Tony Peters – professional football player
- Jeremy Shockey – professional football player, attended NEO in 1999.
- Chuck Smith – professional football player
- Lamar Smith – professional football player
- Jace Sternberger – professional football player
- Darwin Thompson – professional football player
- Greg Tremble – professional football player
- James Wilder Sr. – professional football player
- Pat Williams – professional football player, graduated from NEO in 1995.
