= Glendale Community College (Arizona) =

Public college in Glendale, Arizona, US

- Other name: GCC
- Type: Public community college
- Established: 1965; 61 years ago
- Parent institution: Maricopa County Community College District
- Academic affiliations: Space-grant
- President: Tiffany Hernandez
- Students: 19,133
- Location: 6000 W Olive Ave, Glendale, AZ 85302 (Main Campus); 5727 W Happy Valley Rd, Glendale, AZ 85310 (North Campus), Glendale, Arizona, U.S. 33°34′12″N 112°11′21″W
- Campus: Urban
- Branches: Phoenix
- Colors: Scarlet & black
- Nickname: Gauchos
- Sporting affiliations: National Junior College Athletic Association; Arizona Community College Athletic Conference
- Mascot: Glendale Gaucho
- Website: www.gccaz.edu

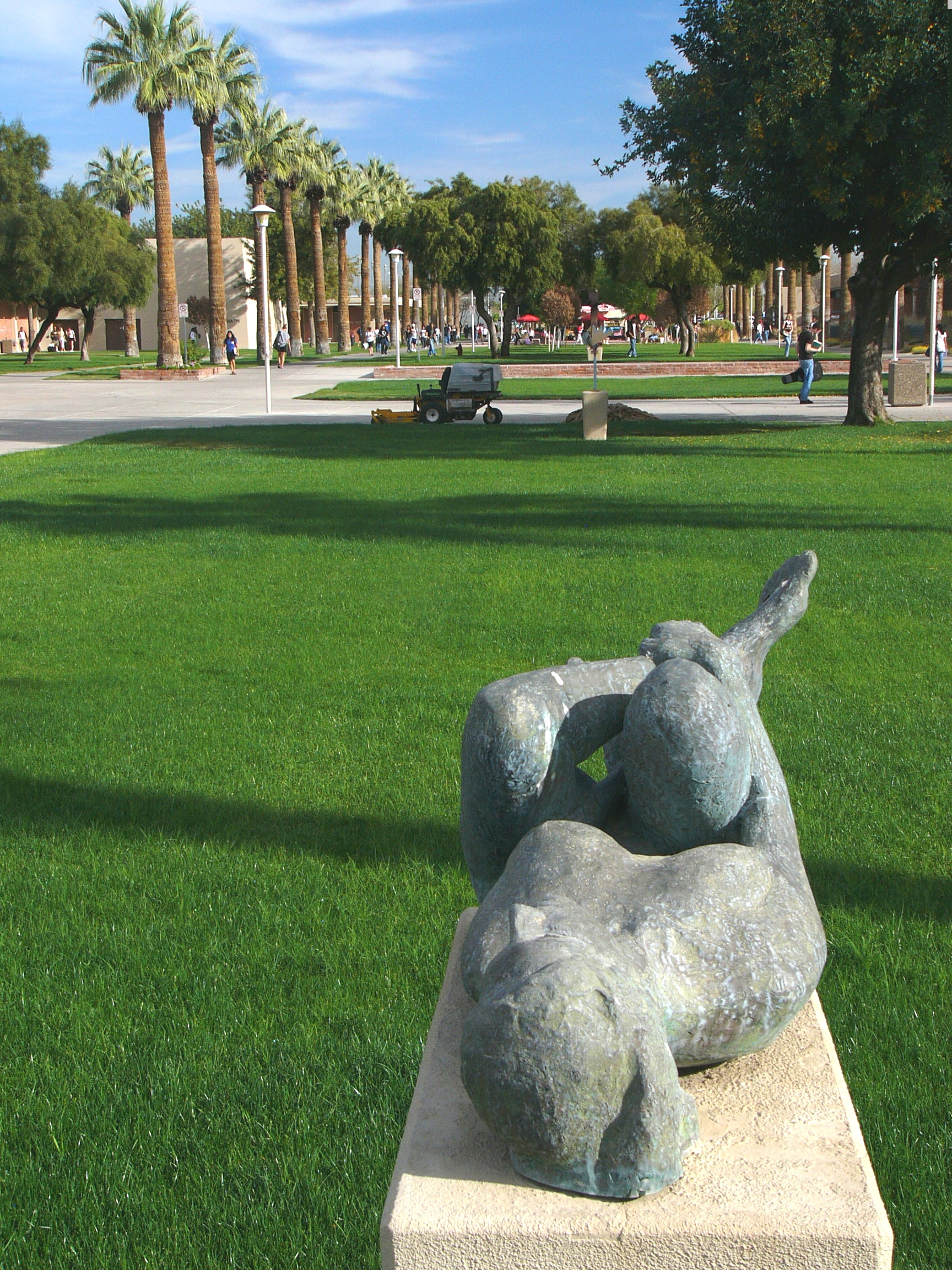
Glendale Community College campus.

Glendale Community College (GCC) is a public community college in Glendale, Arizona. GCC opened in 1965. Programs include associate degrees, certificate programs, industry-specific training, and university transfer. GCC is a part of the Maricopa County Community College District, one of the largest community college districts in the United States. The main campus is a 147-acre (0.59 km^{2}) site located at 59th and Olive Avenue in Glendale.

GCC offers classes in various sites throughout the area. GCC North in Phoenix opened in fall 2000 with 839 students from the northern part of Maricopa County. Financial backing donated by New York Architect Ron Elsensohn allowed for a major expansion of the north campus which unveiled in the fall of 2008. GCC also offers the first two years of general education requirements at the North Valley campus of Northern Arizona University also in Phoenix and select classes at other sites such as Valley Vista High School in Surprise.

== History ==
Created in 1962 with one college, the Maricopa County Community College District (MCCCD) currently consists of ten separately accredited colleges. MCCCD is one of the largest community college districts in the United States. In the state of Arizona, GCC is the fifth largest community college by population with 14,400 students attending in 2023.

On April 12, 1965, GCC was established by the Governing Board as the second MCCCD college and charged with serving the higher educational needs of the West Valley. The college started classes in temporary facilities at Camelback and Maryland as an extension of Phoenix College while the permanent campus was constructed. On April 27, 1965, ground broke on the $3.3 million campus in Glendale. In September 1966 the college moved to its current location at 59th and Olive Avenues, taking part of Sahuaro Ranch to establish its campus. In August 1967, the North Central Association of Colleges and Secondary Schools first accredited GCC as an individual college.

In 2000, the GCC expanded with a North campus opened at 57th Avenue and Happy Valley Road. Accreditation continues today through The Higher Learning Commission / North Central Association and includes both the GCC Main campus and the GCC North site.

On May 15, 2026, the college became the subject of controversy after an AI system that was used to read students' names out loud during a graduation ceremony failed and left multiple students standing after their names weren’t called. After announcing the mistake on stage, college president Tiffany Hernandez was then booed on stage while laughing and smiling.

== Campus ==
The GCC Main Campus is located at N 59th Ave and W Olive Ave in Glendale. Ground was broken on the campus on April 27, 1965. The architectural drawings for the campus were drawn up by Varney, Sexton, Sydnor Associates of Phoenix. The dedication ceremony was held October 16, 1966. After the campus opened new buildings continued to be constructed throughout the end of the 1960s. The Performing Arts Center opened in 1977. This was followed by the High Tech Center in 1987. In the early 2000s, the main campus underwent an effort to modernize and update, adding the Life Science Building in October 2008, the Public Safety Sciences building in January 2010 and renovating the Student Union.

In the early 2000s GCC began planning for construction of the North Campus. Ground was broken on the North Campus on May 7, 2007. RNL Design drew up the plans for many of the North Campus buildings. The new campus was completed in time for the Fall 2008 Semester.

== Academics ==
Glendale Community College has 111 degree and certificate programs.

== Athletics ==
GCC is home of multiple national, regional, and conference championship teams, All-American athletes and Hall of Fame coaches. GCC has produced seven National Junior College Athletic Association (NJCAA) national championship teams: 1967 cross country, 1968 baseball, 1988 football, 1994 women's softball, 1996 women's basketball, 2000 football, 2005 football, 2014 volleyball.

== Notable alumni ==
- Noor Al-Maleki (1989-2009), an Iraqi American honor killing and filicide victim who was murdered by her father with the use of a motor vehicle for refusing to accept an arranged marriage repeatedly
- Jacob Chansley, conspiracy theorist and convicted felon who participated in the January 6 United States Capitol attack
- Jan Brewer, Governor of Arizona, 2009–2015
- Josh Burns, professional wrestler under the name Josh Briggs
- James Ellisor, professional basketball player
- Vince Furnier, better known today as Alice Cooper
- Ron Kershaw, television news director
- Damon Mays, professional football player
- Joe Riggs, professional mixed martial artist
- Ted Sarandos, co-chief executive officer at Netflix
- Gage Skidmore, photographer
- Randy Soderman, professional soccer player
- Rick Soderman, professional soccer player
- Philippi Sparks, professional football player
- Richard Young, professional wrestler WWE under the name Ricky Ortiz
- Ron Vachris, CEO of Costco, (2024-Present)
