= Browne =

Browne is a variant of the English surname Brown, meaning "brown-haired" or "brown-skinned". It may sometimes be derived from French le Brun with similar meaning. The Mac an Bhreitheamhnaigh clan of County Donegal have anglicized as Browne since about 1800. The name has also been used throughout North America as an anglicization of the Spanish surname Pardo.

An Irish originated branch of this English family passed to Portugal in the 17th century. Andrew (then André Browne) was father of Dr Pedro Browne, married to Francisca Xavier Clamouse, and of Domingos Clamouse Browne, professed Knight of the Order of Christ and Consul of France in the city of Porto, married to Maria Custódia do Nascimento, daughter of Domingos Fernandes Sada and his wife Maria da Cruz, of whom he had Manuel Clamouse Browne, who had Chart of Arms with the arms of the Brownes on 13 February 1850. They used the following arms: argent, flanked sable, three merlettes sable aligned pale, and one leopard silver over each flank; crest: unknown.

- Adam Browne (born 1963), Australian speculative fiction writer
- Aidan Browne, Northern Irish television presenter
- Aidan Browne (Gaelic footballer) (born 1998), Irish Gaelic footballer
- Alan Browne (born 1974), Irish hurler
- Alan Browne (footballer) (born 1995), Irish footballer
- Alex Browne (born 1992), Australian rules footballer
- Alex Browne (politician), Antigua and Barbuda politician
- Alexander Browne (1863–1942), British politician
- Alfred Browne (born 1959), Antigua and Barbuda sprinter
- Allan Browne (1944–2015), Australian jazz drummer
- Allan Browne (cricketer) (1888–1941), Barbadian cricketer
- Alyla Browne (born 2009 or 2010), Estonian–Australian actress
- Ambrose Browne (1659–1688), English politician
- Amery Browne, Trinidad and Tobago politician
- Andrew Browne (footballer, born 1984), Australian rules footballer
- Andrew Browne (footballer, born 1990), Australian rules footballer
- Andrew Browne (rugby union) (born 1987), Irish rugby union player
- Andrew Browne (artist) (born 1960), Australian contemporary artist
- Angela Browne (1938–2001), British actress
- Angela Browne (nun) (born 1884), Australian Sister of Mercy
- Ann Browne (born 1955), West Indian cricketer
- Anne Browne (1509–1582), 16th-century English noblewoman
- Annie Leigh Browne (1851–1936), British educationist and suffragist
- Anthony Browne (politician) (born 1967), British journalist, businessman and politician
- Anthony Browne (died 1506) (1443–1506), English knight
- Anthony Browne (died 1548) (1500–1548), English politician and nobleman
- Anthony Browne (author) (born 1946), British writer and illustrator
- Anthony Browne (judge) (1509–1567), English politician and justice
- Anthony Browne (1552–1592), English noble
- Anthony Montague Browne (1923–2013), British diplomat
- Arthur Browne (bishop) (1864–1951), British Anglican bishop
- Arthur Browne (1756–1805), Irish lawyer, academic, and politician
- Arthur Browne (1732–1779), Irish politician
- Arthur Davis Browne (1887–1974), American medical officer
- Atticus Browne (born 1991), Vincentian cricketer
- Augusta Browne (1820–1882), American composer
- Aurora Browne, Canadian actress and comedian
- Baron Browne, American bassist
- Barrington Browne (born 1967), Guyanese cricketer
- Beatrice Blore Browne, first woman to drive a car up the Great Orme
- Belmore Browne (1880–1954), American artist and explorer
- Sir Benjamin Chapman Browne (1839–1917), English industrialist and shipbuilder
- Buckston Browne (1850–1945), English physician
- Bud Browne (1912–2008), American film director
- Byron Browne (disambiguation)
- Carl Browne (1849–1914), American cattle rancher, cartoonist, journalist and political activist in Coxey's Army
- Carolyn Browne (born 1958), British ambassador
- Chance Browne (1948–2024), American comic strip artist
- Chris Browne (1952–2023), American cartoonist
- Christopher Browne (disambiguation), several people
- Coral Browne (1913–1991), Australian actress
- Courtney Browne (born 1970), Barbadian cricketer
- Cyril Browne (disambiguation)
- Daniel Browne (disambiguation)
- Davey Browne (1986–2015), Australian professional boxer
- David Browne (disambiguation), several people
- Dean Browne (born 1993 or 1994), Irish poet
- Des Browne (born 1952), British politician
- Dik Browne (1917–1989), American comic strip artist
- Edward Browne (disambiguation), several people
- Ernest Browne (1855–1946), Irish tennis player
- Eliane Browne-Bartroli (1917–1944), British intelligence agent
- Elizabeth Browne (disambiguation)
- Emma Browne (disambiguation)
- Feargal Browne (born 1973), Irish politician
- Federico Browne (born 1976), Argentine retired tennis player
- Garech Browne (1939–2018), Irish arts patron
- George Browne (disambiguation), several people
- Gordon Browne (1858–1932), English artist and illustrator
- Hablot Knight Browne (1815–1882), British illustrator
- Harrison Browne (born 1993), Canadian hockey player
- Harry Browne (disambiguation)
- Henry Browne (disambiguation), several people
- Henry Gore-Browne (1830–1912), Irish soldier, recipient of the Victoria Cross
- Howard Browne (1908–1999), American writer
- Irene Mary Browne (1881–1977), British artist
- Isaac Hawkins Browne (disambiguation)
- Ivan Browne (born 1947), singer in American pop band The Lemon Pipers
- Jack Browne (disambiguation)
- Jackson Browne (born 1948), American musician
- James Browne (disambiguation), several people
- Janet Browne (born 1950), British historian of science
- Jann Browne (born 1954), American country singer
- Jeremy Browne (disambiguation)
- John Browne (disambiguation), several people
- Jonathan Browne (1601–1643), English Anglican priest
- Jonathan Browne (racing driver) (born 2000), Irish racing driver
- Joseph Browne (disambiguation), several people
- Joy Browne (1944–2016), American radio psychologist
- Kale Browne (born 1950), American actor
- Kathie Browne (1930–2003), American actress
- Kathleen Brown (disambiguation)
- Leslie Browne (born 1957), American ballet dancer
- Lucille Baldwin Brown (1922–2019), American librarian
- Martin Browne (disambiguation)
- Mary Browne (disambiguation)
- Maximilian Ulysses Browne (1705–1757), Austrian field marshal
- McKenzie Browne (born 1995), American speed skater
- Michael Browne (disambiguation), several people
- Millicent Browne (1881–1975), British suffragette
- Moyra Browne (1918–2016), British nurse
- Nicholas Browne (disambiguation)
- Noël Browne (1915–1997), Irish politician and physician
- Norman Anil Kumar Browne (born 1951), Indian Air Force (IAF) Air Chief Marshall (2011–2013)
- Olin Browne (born 1959), American golfer
- Omar Browne (born 1994), Panamanian footballer
- Patrick Browne (disambiguation), several people
- Patti Ann Browne (born 1965), American broadcaster
- Peter Browne (disambiguation), several people
- Raymond Browne (disambiguation)
- Reginald Browne (disambiguation)
- Robert Browne (disambiguation), several people
- Ronnie Browne (born 1937), Scottish folk singer
- Roscoe Lee Browne (1922–2007), American actor
- Rose Browne (1897–1986), American educator
- Sam Browne (disambiguation), several people
- Sean Browne (disambiguation)
- Sidney Browne (1850–1941), British nurse
- Spencer Browne (born 2003), American Musician, stage name Malcolm Mark
- Stan Browne (born 1962), Australian rugby league footballer
- Stanley Browne (disambiguation)
- Steven Browne (born 1989), Australian footballer
- Sylvester John Browne (1841–1915), Australian pastoralist, miner and sportsman
- Sylvia Browne (1936–2013), American medium
- Tara Browne (1945–1966), British socialite
- Thomas Browne (disambiguation), several people
- Thom Browne, American fashion designer
- Tim Browne (born 1987), Australian Rugby League player
- Tom Browne (disambiguation), several people
- Tracy Browne, survivor of an attack be English English serial killer Peter Sutcliffe
- Travis Browne (born 1982), American mixed martial arts fighter
- Ulric Browne, British actor
- Valentine Browne (disambiguation), several people
- Vanessa Browne (born 1963), Australian high jumper
- Vincent Browne (born 1944), Irish journalist
- Vincent Browne (sculptor) (born 1947), Irish sculptor
- Walter Browne (1949–2015), American chess player
- Wayles Browne (born 1941), American linguist and Slavist
- William Browne (disambiguation), several people

== Given name ==
- Browne Bushell (bap. 1609, d. 1651), English Civil War-era naval officer
- Browne Langrish (died 1759), English physician and medical author
- Browne C. Lewis (c. 1962–2022), dean of the University of North Carolina School of Law
- Browne Willis (1682–1760), English antiquary, author, numismatist and member of the House of Commons

== See also ==
- Brown (surname)
- Broun (surname)
- Earl of Kenmare, where Browne is the family name
- Viscount Montagu, where Browne is the family name
- Marquess of Sligo, where Browne is the family name
- Baron Oranmore and Browne
- Tribes of Galway, which includes Browne as one of the tribes
