= Chris Brown (disambiguation) =

Chris Brown (born 1989) is an American R&B singer.

Chris Brown or Christopher Brown may also refer to:

== Music ==
=== Artists ===
- Chris Brown (Australian musician), member of Ayers Rock
- Hugh Christopher Brown (formerly Chris Brown), Canadian singer-songwriter and multi-instrumentalist
- Chris Brown (Christian singer), American Christian singer-songwriter with Elevation Worship
- Chris Brown (composer) (born 1953), American composer, pianist, and electronic musician
- Chris Taylor Brown (born 1981), singer for Trapt
- Brody Brown (born Christopher Steven Brown), American songwriter, producer, and multi-instrumentalist
- Christopher Roland Brown (born 1943), British composer
- Christopher Steven Brown (born 1984), American music executive
- Chris Brown, one half of the British duo Ruff Driverz

=== Albums ===
- Chris Brown (album), by Chris Brown, 2005

== Sport ==
=== Cricket ===
- Chris Brown (umpire), former Cook Islands cricketer and current New Zealand international cricket umpire.
- Chris Brown (cricketer, born 1974), English cricketer

=== Gridiron football ===
- Chris Brown (American football coach) (born 1974), American football coach and former player
- Chris Brown (defensive back) (born 1962), American football player
- Chris Brown (defensive back, born 1978), American football player
- Chris Brown (offensive lineman) (born 1978), former American football offensive lineman
- Chris Brown (running back) (born 1981), American football player

=== Football ===
- Chris Brown (soccer, born 1977), American soccer midfielder/striker
- Chris Brown (footballer, born 1971), English-American football defender and manager
- Chris Brown (footballer, born 1984), English football striker
- Chris Brown (footballer, born 1992), English football defender
- Chris Brown (sportscaster), Buffalo Bills radio broadcaster

=== Hockey ===
- Chris Brown (field hockey) (born 1960), New Zealand
- Chris Brown (ice hockey) (born 1991), American ice hockey player drafted by the Phoenix Coyotes
- Christophe Brown (born 1974), Swiss ice hockey player in the Switzerland National League A

=== Other sports ===
- Chris Brown (sprinter) (born 1978), Bahamian sprinter
- Chris Brown (runner, born circa 1970), American middle-distance runner, 1992 All-American for the Michigan State Spartans track and field team
- Chris Brown (hammer thrower) (born 1978), American hammer thrower, 2000 weight throw All-American for the Purdue Boilermakers track and field team
- Chris Brown (baseball) (1961–2006), American third baseman
- Cris Brown (born 1963), Australian freestyle wrestler

== Politics ==
- Chris Brown (New Jersey politician) (born 1964), member of the New Jersey General Assembly
- Christopher J. Brown (born 1971), member of the New Jersey General Assembly
- Chris Brown (California politician) (born 1981), American politician and businessman in the state of California
- Christopher Brown (Jamaican politician), Jamaican member of parliament
- Chris Brown (Mississippi politician) (born 1971), Republican Mississippi state representative and businessman
- Chris Brown (Missouri politician), member of the Missouri House of Representatives
- Chris Brown (New Hampshire politician), member of the New Hampshire House of Representatives
- Chris Brown (Vermont politician), member-elect of the Vermont House of Representatives

== Other people ==
- Christopher Brown (artist), (born 1951), American painter, printmaker, professor
- Christopher Brown (author), American science fiction author
- Christopher Brown (museum director) (born 1948), director of the Ashmolean Museum
- Chris Brown (British Army officer), last General Officer Commanding Northern Ireland
- Chris Brown (veterinarian) (born 1978), Australian veterinarian, television personality and author
- M. Christopher Brown II, president of Alcorn State University
- Chris Brown (dancer) (1896–1956), Native American dancer and costume maker
- Christopher Brown (actor) (born 1973), New Zealand actor
- Christopher Jonathan Brown, birth name of Chris Barrie (born 1960), British actor and comedian
- Chris Brown (explorer) (born 1962), British explorer and adventurer

== See also ==
- Christopher Browne (disambiguation)
- Kris Brown (born 1976), American football player
- Christy Brown (1932–1981), Irish author, painter and poet
- Christina Brown, American journalist
