= Mary Brown =

Mary Brown or Browne may refer to:

- Mary Brown, alias for Typhoid Mary (1869–1938), first identified asymptomatic carrier of typhoid fever in the United States
- Mary Brown (author) (1929–1999), British fantasy and science fiction author
- Mary Brown (Michigan politician) (1935–2021), American politician and educator
- Mary Brown (nurse) (1840–1936), nurse and soldier in the American Civil War
- Mary Brown Bullock (born 1944), American academic specializing in Chinese history
- Mary Browne (1891–1971), American tennis player
- Mary Browne, Countess of Southampton (1552–1603), English peer
- Mary Ann Brown (?–1963), American murder victim
- Mary Ann Browne (1812–1845), English poet and writer of musical scores
- Mary Ann Brown Newcomb (1817–1892), American camp- and hospital nurse during the American Civil War
- Mary Ann Brown Patten (1837–1861), American woman who was the first female American merchant vessel commander
- Mary Ann Day Brown (1816–1884), wife of abolitionist John Brown
- Mary Annora Brown (1899–1987), Canadian artist
- Mary Antoinette Brown-Sherman (1926–2004), Liberian educator and academic administrator
- Mary Babnik Brown (1907–1991), American who donated her hair for using as bombsight crosshairs
- Mary Bonaventure Browne (17th century), Irish abbess and historian
- Mary Elizabeth Brown (1862–1952), first female graduate of the University of Sydney
- Mary Louise Brown (1868–1927), first African-American woman to receive a wartime medical commission
- Mary Ward Brown (1917–2013), American short-story writer and memoirist
- Mary Browne (courtier) (1593–1692), English aristocrat
- Mary Elizabeth Adams Brown (1842–1918), American writer, collector, and curator of musical instruments
- Mary Brown (songwriter), American singer and songwriter
- "Mary Brown", a song by Irving Berlin
- Mary Brown Austin (1768–1824), née Brown, pioneer in the early settlement of Anglo-Americans in Texas
- Mary Brown Channel (1907–2006), née Brown, American architect
- Mary Brown Pharr (1919–1972), née Brown, American classicist
- Mary Jane Brown (1895–1976), American academic and World War II nurse
- Mary Willcox Brown Glenn (1869–1940), née Brown, American social worker
- Mary Leigh (1885–1979), née Brown, English political activist and suffragette

== See also ==
- Mary Brown's (founded in 1969), restaurant chain in Canada
