= Stan Brown =

Stan Brown may refer to:

== Sportspeople ==
- Stan Brown (Australian footballer) (1921–1994), Australian rules footballer
- Stan Brown (basketball) (1929–2009), American basketball player
- Stanley Brown (cricketer, born 1877) (1877–1952), English cricketer
- Stanley Brown (cricketer, born 1885) (1885–1945), New Zealand cricketer and surgeon
- Stanley Brown (cricketer, born 1907) (1907–1978), English cricketer
- Stan Brown (English footballer) (1941–2018), English footballer
- Stan Brown (ice hockey) (1898–1987), Canadian ice hockey defenceman

== Others ==
- Stan! (Steven Brown, born 1964), American author, sometimes credited as Stan Brown
- Stan Brown (actor), who appeared in the 2005 film Almost Normal
- Stanley Brown (actor), (1914–2001), Canadian film actor
- Stanley Brown (engineer) (1910–1997), English mechanical and electrical engineer
- Stanley Brown (musician), American musician, songwriter and producer
- J. Stanley Brown (1863–1939), leader in high school and post-secondary education in the United States
- Stanley Brown, a character in the 1950 film State Penitentiary

== See also ==
- Stan Browne (born 1962), Australian education administrator and former rugby league player
- Stanley Browne (RNZAF officer) (1919–2011), New Zealand flying ace of World War II
- Stanley George Browne (1907–1986), British medical missionary and leprologist
