= Jerry Brown (disambiguation) =

Jerry Brown (born 1938) is an American politician, former Governor of California.

Jerry Brown may also refer to:

- Jerry Brown (gridiron football) (1987–2012), American football player
- Jerry Dolyn Brown (1942–2016), American folk artist and potter
- Jerry B. Brown (born 1942), American anthropologist and ethnomycologist

== See also ==
- Gerald Brown (disambiguation)
- Gerry Brown (disambiguation)
- Gerry Browne (disambiguation)
- Jeremiah Brown (disambiguation)
- Jeremy Brown (disambiguation)
- Jerome Brown (1965–1992), American football defensive lineman
- Jerome Brown (arena football) (born 1965), American football player
- Jerry Browne (born 1966), Major League Baseball second baseman
