= Isaac Hawkins =

Isaac Hawkins may refer to:

- Isaac Roberts Hawkins, a 19th-century member of the United States House of Representatives from Tennessee
- Issac Hawkins, an enslaved African American who was a subject of the 1838 Jesuit slave sale

== See also ==
- Isaac Hawkins Browne (disambiguation)
- John Isaac Hawkins
