= The House of Ruth Maryland =

Domestic violence organization in Baltimore, Maryland

- Formation: May, 1977; 49 years ago
- Type: Non-profit
- Headquarters: 2201 Argonne Drive, Baltimore, Maryland, 20218
- Coordinates: 39.339760°N 76.583140°W
- Region served: Baltimore; Montgomery County; Prince George's County
- Services: Domestic violence shelter; counseling; hotline; case management; rapid re-housing; legal services
- Fields: Domestic violence • Intimate partner violence
- Executive Director: Katie Allston
- Website: Official website

House Of Ruth Maryland is a non-profit organization that was founded in 1977 by a coalition of women's organizations, religious groups, service providers, and elected officials to provide a safe haven for victims of domestic violence and their children. It is headquartered in Baltimore, Maryland, United States and has offices throughout the state of Maryland. House of Ruth Maryland leads the fight to end violence against women and their children by confronting the attitudes, behaviors and systems that perpetuate it, and by providing victims with the services necessary to rebuild their lives safely and free of fear. Funding for House of Ruth Maryland is made possible through private (53%) and government (38%) funds, and other sources (9%) including investment income, training and client fees resulting mainly from the Gateway Project. Since its inception, The House of Ruth Maryland has served over 100,000 victims of domestic violence.

== Timeline ==
1977

A small group of volunteers opens Maryland's first shelter for battered women and children. (House Of Ruth)

1978

House Of Ruth is selected as the model shelter program for Maryland and receives its first state funding, allowing it to begin offering support services in conjunction with shelter.

1979

House Of Ruth introduces a voluntary 22-week counseling program designed to modify the behavior of abusive men, the first program of its kind in the state of Maryland. (The Gateway Project)

1980

House Of Ruth begins offering housing and counseling services to clients.

1981

House Of Ruth begins offering counseling to clients’ children.

1982

House Of Ruth expands its shelter, services and sets up the first, statewide, 24-hour hotline for victims of domestic violence.

1983

House Of Ruth opens a legal clinic to provide legal services to victims of domestic violence and expands its voluntary batterers’ program to include court-ordered abusers. House Of Ruth begins providing consultation to the United States Navy on how to work with batterers.

1984

House Of Ruth, in cooperation with Women's Law Center, receives a grant from Maryland Legal Services to create the Domestic Violence Law Clinic.

1987

House Of Ruth consolidates its services and opens the doors to its new, 24-bed Montebello facility.

1992

House Of Ruth opens its first Victim's Advocacy Office in the Baltimore City District Court.

1997

House Of Ruth launches its Teen Dating Violence Prevention Initiative, a community-based program geared towards teaching adolescents and young adults about healthy relationships.

== Leadership ==
Katie Allston, Executive Director

Dorothy Lennig, Director of Marjorie Cook Legal Clinic at House of Ruth Maryland

Janice Miller, Director of Survivor Engagement & Stability

Phyliss Mosca, Director of Development

Josh Sutherland, Chief Financial Officer

Lisa Nitsch, Chief Operating Officer

Latoya Molina, Director of Human Resources

Asjoure Brown, Director of Clinical Services

== Services Offered ==
=== Hotline Counseling ===
The House of Ruth Maryland has a 24-hour hotline that provides counseling and referrals to domestic violence victims, abusive partners, and concerned family and friends, as well as support and technical assistance to professionals.

=== Emergency Shelter and Transitional Housing ===
The residential program provides a safe haven for victims of intimate partner violence and their children in imminent risk of death or serious injury. The emergency shelter and six transitional apartments accommodate 84 women and children.

=== Legal Assistance ===
The Marjorie Cook Legal Clinic at House of Ruth Maryland provides free legal advice and representation in securing Protective/Peace Orders; and divorce and custody cases as needed.

=== Counseling for Adults and Children ===
The Clinical Services Program provides victims of intimate partner violence with short-term crisis counseling that focuses on safety and reducing clients' trauma related symptoms. Individual and group counseling are available for adults, children, and youth.

=== Client Service Coordination ===
Client Service Coordinators work with victims in House of Ruth Maryland services and in the community providing safety planning, basic needs assistance, and resource referral

=== Training, Outreach and Prevention Education ===
House of Ruth Maryland's Training Institute provides community education, training, consultation and technical assistance to professionals and the community at large on intimate partner violence (IPV) and issues related to IPV.

=== Abuse Intervention Program ===
The organization provides a 28-week education program structured to systematically challenge an abusive partner's belief system and teach abusers how to maintain healthy, non-violent relationships.

=== Services in Montgomery and Prince George's Counties ===
House of Ruth Maryland also has a location in Montgomery County located in Rockville, that provides legal and therapeutic services.

== Additional Domestic Violence Resources in Maryland ==
In Maryland, various private organizations provide comprehensive services on a county-by-county basis.

The organizations that serve victims of domestic violence in Baltimore City and the surrounding counties that comprise Central Maryland are:

- Family and Children's Services of Central Maryland (fcsmd.org) offers domestic violence services in Baltimore County and Carroll County
- TurnAround, Inc. (turnaroundinc.org) offers domestic violence services in Baltimore City and Baltimore County
- YWCA Domestic Violence Services (ywca.org) serves Anne Arundel County
- HopeWorks (hopeworksofhc.org) serves Howard County

The Maryland Network Against Domestic Violence offers a detailed list of domestic violence service providers in Maryland.
