= Stanley Browne =

Stanley Browne may refer to:

- Stanley Browne (RNZAF officer) (1919–2011), New Zealand flying ace of World War II
- Stanley George Browne (1907–1986), British medical missionary and leprologist

== See also ==
- Stan Browne (born 1962), Australian education administrator and former rugby league player
- Stan Brown (disambiguation)
