= Gerald Brown =

Gerald Brown may refer to:

== Sports ==
- Gerald Brown (American football) (born 1959), American football coach
- Gerald Brown (basketball) (born 1975), American basketball player
- Gerry Brown (ice hockey) (1917–1998), Canadian ice hockey player

== Others ==
- Gerald E. Brown (1926–2013), American theoretical physicist
- Gerald Brown (priest) (1935–2002), Archdeacon of Scandinavia and Germany

== See also ==
- Gerald Browne (disambiguation)
- Jerald Brown (born 1980), American-born Canadian football player
- Gerry Brown (disambiguation)
- Jerry Brown (disambiguation)
