= Gerry Browne (disambiguation) =

Gerry or Jerry Browne may refer to:

- Jerry Browne (born 1966), American baseball player
- Gerry Browne (born 1944), Trinidadian and Tobagonian footballer
- Gerry Browne (Gaelic footballer), see Mick Aherne

== See also ==
- Gerald Browne (disambiguation)
- Gerry Brown (disambiguation)
- Jerry Brown (disambiguation)
