= Marty Brown =

Marty Brown may refer to:

- Marty Brown (baseball) (born 1963), American former baseball player
- Marty Brown (singer) (born 1965), American country singer

== See also ==
- Martin Brown (disambiguation)
