= Gerald Browne =

Gerald Browne may refer to:

- Gerald Browne (politician) (1871/1872–1951), Unionist politician in Northern Ireland
- Gerald A. Browne (1924–2015), American author and editor
- Gerald Browne (cricketer) (1850–1910), British cricket player
- Gerald Michael Browne (1943–2004), American professor of classics
- Gerald Browne, 7th Earl of Kenmare (1896–1952), Earl of Kenmare

== See also ==
- Gerald Brown (disambiguation)
- Gerry Browne (disambiguation)
