= Kim Davis (executive) =

American corporate executive

- Occupations: Executive Vice President, Social Impact, Growth Initiatives & Legislative Affairs
- Years active: 2017-present
- Organization: National Hockey League

Kimberly B. Davis is an American corporate executive serving as a vice president with the NHL.

== Early life and education ==
Davis's grandmother played basketball in Georgia in the 1920s. In 1939, her grandmother Dr. Rose Butler Browne was the first Black woman to earn a PhD from Harvard University.

Davis grew up in Chicago. She played varsity tennis in high school. She attended Spelman College, an all-women's, historically Black college in Atlanta. She graduated in the late 1970s with a degree in economics.

== Career ==
Beginning in 1991, Davis worked as a director for JPMorgan Chase, including serving as president of the JPMorgan Chase Foundation. In 1995, she became the first African American woman to be promoted to the bank's senior vice president position. After over twenty years with the company, she left JPMorgan to become Senior Managing Director at Teneo.

In December 2017, Davis began a new role as Executive Vice President of Social Impact, Growth Initiatives & Legislative Affairs for the National Hockey League, with a particular impact on improving diversity within the league.

In 2020, the NHL announced the formation of its Executive Inclusion Council. About how to increase inclusion of Black players in the NHL, Davis said:

And our particular situation in our sport is different [than in the NFL], because we don’t necessarily currently have a pipeline of black and brown coaches within our system that we can point to. So our issues are more fundamental. How do we source and identify in the youth hockey system, as well as players who retire who want to be coaches—how do we create and formalize development programs and mentoring programs to create that pipeline of talent?

== Recognition and awards ==
Davis appeared in Ice Queens (2023), a documentary about the history of Black women in ice hockey.

The Simmons University Institute for Inclusive Leadership awarded Davis its Helen G. Drinan Visionary Leader Award in 2026.

== See also ==
- Black players in ice hockey
