= Jeremiah Brown =

Jeremiah Brown may refer to:

- Jeremiah Brown (politician) (1785–1858), American politician from Pennsylvania
- Jeremiah Brown (rower) (born 1985), Canadian rower
- Jeremiah Z. Brown (1839–1916), American Union soldier
- Jeremiah A. Brown (1841–1913), politician and civil rights activist in Cleveland, Ohio

== See also ==
- Jerry Brown (disambiguation)
- Jeremiah Brown House and Mill Site
