= Rinaldo Brutoco =

Canadian businessman (born 1947)

Rinaldo S. Brutoco
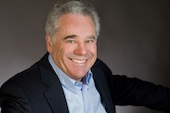
- Rinaldo S. Brutoco
- Born: February 27, 1947 (age 79); Toronto, Canada
- Occupations: Corporate Executive, Attorney
- Spouse: Lalla D. Brutoco
- Website: www.worldbusiness.org

Rinaldo S. Brutoco (born February 27, 1947) is a Canadian-born American attorney, corporate executive, and entrepreneur.

== Early life and education ==
Brutoco was born in Toronto, Canada, and raised in Southern California. He graduated from Santa Clara University in 1968 with a bachelor's degree in economics and philosophy. He subsequently earned a juris doctor degree from the University of California, Los Angeles (UCLA) School of Law in 1971.

== Career ==
In 1972, Brutoco founded the California Public Interest Law Center, an organization that achieved a landmark legal victory against the California Public Utilities Commission, resulting in a $143 million refund to customers of Pacific Telephone and Telegraph Company.

Brutoco co-founded Channel 100, the world’s first pay cable television company, in 1972, as executive vice president and chief operating officer. He also was chairman and CEO of the Red Rose Collection, a lifestyle mail-order catalog company recognized as one of Inc. magazine’s 500 fastest-growing private companies for three consecutive years. The company was notable for being the first catalog retailer to sell A Course in Miracles.

From 1992 to 2018, Brutoco was a board member of Men’s Wearhouse (now Tailored Brands), where he was on the audit committee and played a key role in the company’s initial public offering.

Currently, he is the principal and CEO of ShangriLa Consulting Group, Inc., as well as the founder and CEO of Seven Oaks Ranch, a manufacturer and distributor of organic food and cosmetics. Brutoco is also the founding chairman of H2 Clipper, a company developing hydrogen-powered dirigibles for sustainable transportation.

He is the founding chairman of The Optimist Daily, a digital platform delivering positive news to over 30,000 subscribers.

== Philanthropy and advocacy ==
In 1987, Brutoco and Willis Harman co-founded the World Business Academy with other business people to create a nonprofit think tank and business network dedicated to ethical leadership and sustainable business practices.

From 2009 to 2010, he chaired the Evolutionary Leaders Administrative Circle, an initiative under the Evolutionary Leaders organization.

In 2013, Brutoco co-founded JUST Capital, a nonprofit that promotes stakeholder capitalism by providing market data on corporate social responsibility. Originally a collaboration between the World Business Academy and the Chopra Foundation, it now operates as an independent organization headquartered in New York City, with Brutoco on its executive committee and chairing its audit and finance committees.

== Awards and recognition ==
Brutoco has received accolades, including:

- A United States Congressional Commendation in 2010.
- The Ellis Island Medal of Honor in 2016.
- The Santa Barbara United Nations Association Peace Prize in 2018.

== Publications ==
Brutoco has co-authored several books, including:

- Freedom from Mid-East Oil (2007), which examines the intersection of global warming, peak oil, and energy consumption.
- Profiles in Power: The Anti-Nuclear Movement and the Dawn of the Solar Age (1997), which highlights alternatives to fossil fuels and nuclear energy.
- The New Paradigm in Business: Emerging Strategies for Leadership and Organizational Change (1993), based on a seminar he delivered on innovative leadership approaches.
- H2 Clipper Granted U.S. Patent for “Lighter-Than-Air” Dirigible Design, Advancing the Company’s Mission to Accelerate the Hydrogen Economy.
- H2 Clipper's Disruptive Airship Boasts Insane Specs, Can Carry 340,000 Lb for 6,000 Miles.
- Electrons vs. molecules: The critical role of hydrogen in hard-to-abate sectors.
- Harnessing the Oceans to Combat Climate Change: The Possible Next Wave in Geoengineering.
