= Rob Ninkovich =

American football player (born 1984)

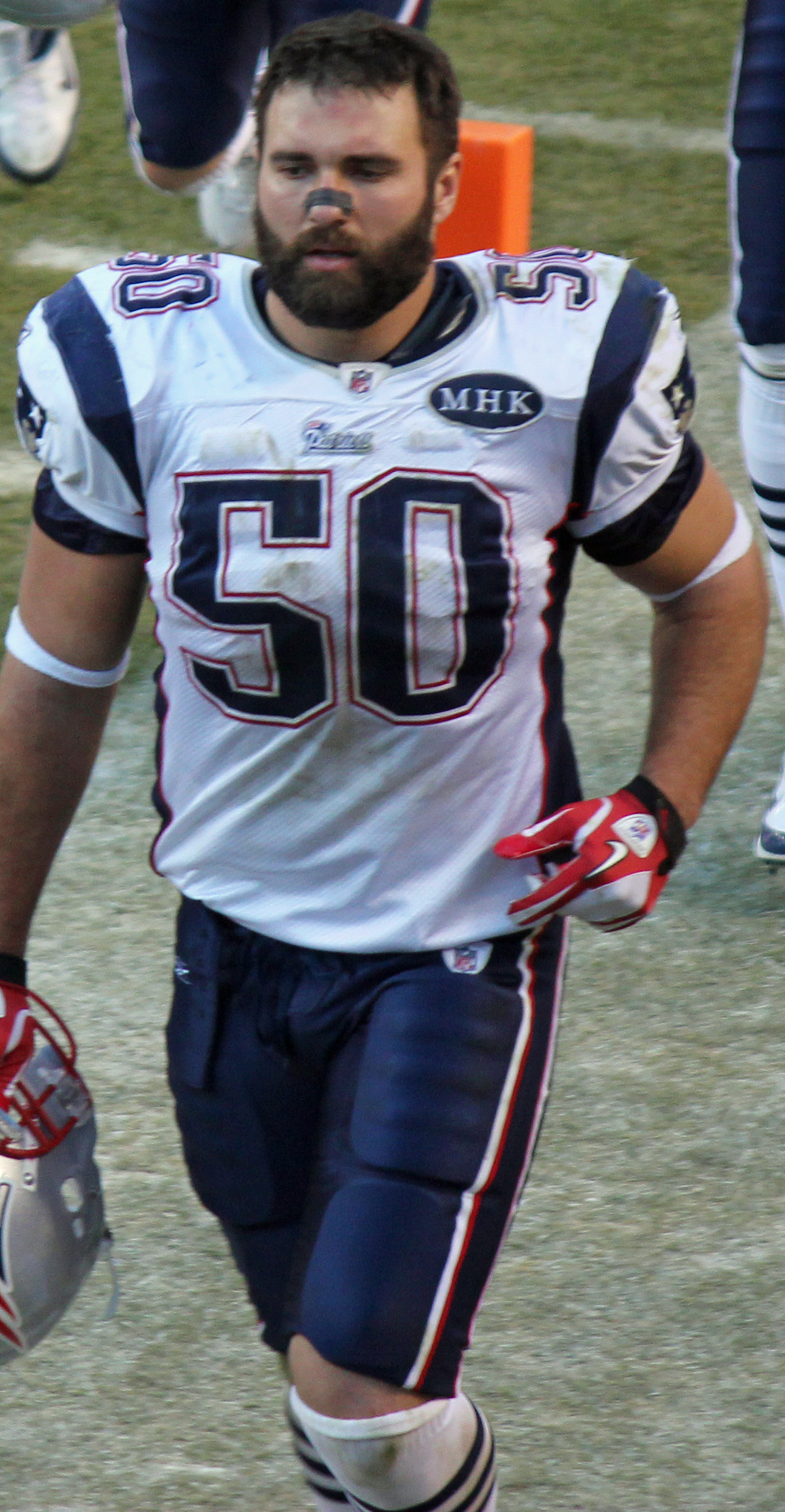
- Ninkovich with the New England Patriots in 2011

No. 50, 93
- Positions: Linebacker, defensive end

Personal information
- Born: February 1, 1984 (age 42); Blue Island, Illinois, U.S.
- Listed height: 6 ft 3 in (1.91 m)
- Listed weight: 260 lb (118 kg)

Career information
- High school: Lincoln-Way Central (New Lenox, Illinois)
- College: Joliet (2002–2003); Purdue (2004–2005)
- NFL draft: 2006: 5th round, 135th overall pick

Career history
- New Orleans Saints (2006); Miami Dolphins (2007–2008); New Orleans Saints (2008); New England Patriots (2009–2016)

Awards and highlights
- 2× Super Bowl champion (XLIX, LI); New England Patriots All-2010s Team; New England Patriots All-Dynasty Team; Third-team NJCAA All-American (2003); Second-team All-Big Ten (2005)

Career NFL statistics
- Total tackles: 460
- Sacks: 46
- Forced fumbles: 12
- Fumble recoveries: 14
- Interceptions: 5
- Defensive touchdowns: 2
- Stats at Pro Football Reference

Robert Michael Ninkovich (born February 1, 1984) is an American former professional football player who was a linebacker and defensive end for eleven seasons in the National Football League (NFL). He played college football for the Purdue Boilermakers as a defensive end and was selected by the New Orleans Saints in the fifth round of the 2006 NFL draft. He also played in the NFL for the Miami Dolphins and New England Patriots, winning two Super Bowls with the latter. After eight seasons with the Patriots, Ninkovich announced his retirement from the NFL following the 2016 season.

== Early life ==
Rob Ninkovich was born in Blue Island, Illinois, to a family of Croatian origin. Following seventh grade, Rob's family relocated to New Lenox, Illinois. He attended Lincoln-Way East High School in Frankfort his freshman and sophomore year then attended Lincoln-Way Central High School in New Lenox his junior and senior years. There, he played defensive end, tight end, and fullback. Ninkovich earned All-State honors for defensive end during his senior year. He also lettered in baseball.

== College career ==
=== Joliet Junior College ===
Following high school, Ninkovich spent two years at Joliet Junior College in Joliet, Illinois. As a freshman, he recorded 36 tackles and seven sacks as the 2002 Joliet Wolves football team won the NJCAA national championship.

During the summer prior to his sophomore year, Ninkovich worked with his father, an ironworker, hanging beams on a Chicago construction site 19 stories high. According to his father, the purpose was to give Rob extra incentive to complete his college education.

As a sophomore at Joliet in 2003, Ninkovich earned third-team NJCAA All-America honors after recording 95 tackles (68 solo), five forced fumbles, four fumbles recovered, and a school-record 16 sacks.

=== Purdue University ===
Ninkovich transferred to Purdue in 2004 and played in all 12 games that season. Despite being a reserve, Ninkovich was tied for the team lead and ranked second in the Big Ten with eight sacks. In an October 2 contest against Notre Dame, Ninkovich recorded two sacks on defense and also caught a goal-line touchdown pass from Kyle Orton. Against Indiana on November 20, he tied a school record with four sacks.

As a senior in 2005, Ninkovich earned second-team All-Big Ten honors after recording 48 tackles, eight sacks, two interceptions, two forced fumbles, and a fumble recovery. He recorded four sacks against Indiana for the second straight season, giving him two of the three individual four-sack performances in school history. In a 37–3 victory over Illinois, he caught a one-yard touchdown pass from Curtis Painter. Following the season, he was invited to play in the East-West Shrine Game.

== Professional career ==
Pre-draft measurables
Height	Weight	Arm length	Hand span	40-yard dash	10-yard split	20-yard split	20-yard shuttle	Three-cone drill	Vertical jump	Broad jump	Bench press
6 ft 3 1/8 in (1.91 m)	260 lb (118 kg)	31 1/4 in (0.79 m)	10 in (0.25 m)	4.80 s	1.68 s	2.86 s	4.18 s	6.96 s	34.5 in (0.88 m)	9 ft 8 in (2.95 m)	23 reps
All values from NFL Combine/Pro Day

=== New Orleans Saints (first stint) ===
==== 2006 ====
The New Orleans Saints selected Ninkovich in the fifth round (135th overall) of the 2006 NFL draft. On July 18, 2006, the Saints signed him to a three-year, $1.22 million contract.

Throughout training camp, Ninkovich competed against Charles Grant, Willie Whitehead, and Eric Moore for the job as the starting defensive end.

On August 21, 2006, the New Orleans Saints lost, 30–7, to the Dallas Cowboys in their second preseason game. During the game, Ninkovich recorded two sacks and two forced fumbles but was also flagged for an unnecessary roughness penalty which led to a Cowboys' touchdown. He finished the preseason with three sacks. Head coach Sean Payton named Ninkovich the backup defensive end to Will Smith and Charles Grant to begin the regular season.

He made his professional regular-season debut during the Saints' season-opener at the Cleveland Browns and recorded three combined tackles during their 19–14 victory. On September 25, 2006, Ninkovich suffered a torn MC ligament in his knee while appearing on special teams during the Saints 23–3 victory over the Atlanta Falcons on Monday Night Football. On September 29, 2006, the Saints placed Ninkovich on season-ending injured reserve after he underwent surgery to repair the torn ligament. Ninkovich finished his rookie season with four combined tackles (two solo) and a pass deflection in three games.

==== 2007 ====
During an afternoon practice on July 30, 2007, Ninkovich was carted off the field with a knee injury. On September 6, 2007, he was waived by the New Orleans Saints as a part of their final roster cuts.

=== Miami Dolphins ===
==== 2007 ====
On September 7, 2007, the Miami Dolphins claimed Ninkovich off of waivers. Head coach Cam Cameron named him the backup defensive end to Jason Taylor and Matt Roth.

On September 16, 2007, Ninkovich made his Miami Dolphins' debut during their 37–20 loss to the Dallas Cowboys. He was inactive for four games (Weeks 4–7) and would go on to play sparingly throughout the season. He was inactive for seven more games in 2007 (Weeks 10–13 and Weeks 14–17). He finished the 2007 season with two combined tackles in four games.

==== 2008 ====
Head coach Cam Cameron was fired after a 1–15 season in 2007. The Miami Dolphins hired Tony Sparano as their new head coach and defensive coordinator Paul Pasqualoni opted to switch the Dolphins' base defense from a 4–3 defense to a 3-4. Ninkovich moved to outside linebacker due to the change. Throughout training camp, he competed against Charlie Anderson, Kelly Poppinga, Quentin Moses, Titus Brown, and Keith Saunders for the role of backup outside linebacker.

He tied Dolphins defensive end Randy Starks with a team-high two sacks during the 2008 preseason. On August 31, 2008, the Dolphins released Ninkovich. On September 3, 2008, he was signed to the Dolphins' practice squad after clearing waivers.

On November 15, 2008, Ninkovich was promoted to the active roster. He played against the Oakland Raiders in a reserve role on November 16 but did not record any tackles.

On November 20, 2008, he was released to make room for linebacker Erik Walden. Ninkovich was re-signed to the practice squad the following day. He finished the 2008 season without any tackles and appeared in only one game.

=== New Orleans Saints (second stint) ===
On December 3, 2008, the New Orleans Saints signed Ninkovich off the Dolphins' practice squad. He was released on July 30, 2009, after the Saints signed long snapper Jason Kyle. Ninkovich had previously been considered as a long snapping option for the Saints in the offseason.

=== New England Patriots ===
==== 2009 ====
On August 2, 2009, the New England Patriots signed Ninkovich to a one-year, $535,000 contract.

He made the Patriots' 53-man roster and recorded his first NFL sack in Week 5 against the Denver Broncos. He received a contract extension through the 2011 season on November 6, 2009. Overall, he played in 15 games for the Patriots in 2009, finishing with 23 tackles and one sack.

==== 2010 ====
Ninkovich began the 2010 season as a starter at outside linebacker. In the team's Week 4 game against the Miami Dolphins on Monday Night Football, Ninkovich recorded his first career interception, and later in the game added another interception and a sack. He finished the season with a career-high 62 tackles, four sacks, and two interceptions in 16 games played (10 starts).

==== 2011 ====
During the 2011 NFL season, Ninkovich recorded his first NFL touchdown when he intercepted a pass from New York Jets quarterback Mark Sanchez and returned it 12 yards for the touchdown. He also had another interception earlier in the same game when he caught a pass tipped by Jerod Mayo. Ninkovich had the best statistical season of his career, recording 74 tackles, 6.5 sacks, two interceptions (one returned for a touchdown), one forced fumble, and three recovered fumbles while starting all 16 regular-season games. During the Patriots' 2011–2012 playoff run, Ninkovich recorded five tackles, 1.5 sacks, one tackle for a loss, and two quarterback hits against the Denver Broncos during the Divisional Round playoff game. Ninkovich recorded seven tackles against the Baltimore Ravens during the AFC Championship. On February 5, 2012, Ninkovich played in Super Bowl XLVI against the New York Giants at Lucas Oil Stadium in Indianapolis, Indiana, but the Patriots lost the Super Bowl to the Giants, 21–17. Ninkovich recorded four tackles (three solo), 0.5 sacks, and two quarterback hits in the game.

==== 2012 ====
During the 2012 offseason, Ninkovich moved to defensive end; his replacement at outside linebacker was Patriots rookie Dont'a Hightower. Ninkovich had two forced fumbles in a game against the Denver Broncos and a game-ending overtime strip sack against the New York Jets. In 2012, he started every game, and had eight sacks, one pass defended, five forced fumbles, and four fumble recoveries on 58 tackles.

==== 2013 ====
In Week 3 of the 2013 season, Ninkovich signed a three-year contract extension, running through 2016, that included $8.5 million in bonuses and guaranteed money and totaled $15 million over its course. In 2013, he started every game, recording eight sacks, two forced fumbles, and two fumble recoveries on 91 total tackles.

==== 2014 ====
Ninkovich set a single-game career high with three sacks in the Patriots Week 6 game against the Buffalo Bills. In Week 8, against the Chicago Bears, Ninkovich recovered a Jay Cutler fumble for his second career touchdown. Ninkovich led the Patriots with eight sacks, his third straight year with eight sacks. In the Patriots' 28–24 win over the Seattle Seahawks in Super Bowl XLIX, which happened to take place on his 31st birthday, Ninkovich sacked Russell Wilson once and recorded six tackles.

==== 2015 ====
Ninkovich started all 16 games for the Patriots in the 2015 season, recording 52 total tackles, 6.5 sacks, seven passes defended, and one forced fumble.

==== 2016 ====
Ninkovich tore his triceps in training camp and was expected to miss a few weeks. On September 2, 2016, Ninkovich was suspended for four games after testing positive for a banned substance.

On September 5, 2016, the Patriots signed Ninkovich to a one-year contract extension through the 2017 season. In the 2016 season, Ninkovich appeared in 12 games. He finished with four sacks, 32 total tackles, two passes defended, and one forced fumble.

On February 5, 2017, Ninkovich was part of the Patriots team that won Super Bowl LI. In the game, he had two assisted tackles as the Patriots defeated the Atlanta Falcons by a score of 34–28 in overtime. In a postgame interview with WBZ Sports, Ninkovich claimed the Patriots "broke down" in the locker room at halftime, resolving afterwards to play "one heck of a 30-minute half." The Patriots trailed 28–3 in the third quarter, but rallied all the way back to win the game 34–28 against the Atlanta Falcons. The game was the first to go to overtime, and the Patriots made the largest comeback in Super Bowl history.

=== Retirement ===
On July 30, 2017, Ninkovich announced his retirement from the NFL after eleven seasons, including eight with the Patriots.

In July 2019, ESPN announced that Ninkovich would be joining the network as an NFL analyst. In June 2023, it was reported that Ninkovich's contract would be not renewed.

== NFL career statistics ==
Legend
	Won the Super Bowl
**Bold**	Career high

=== Regular season ===
Year	Team	GP	Tackles				Fumbles			Interceptions					
Year	Team	GP	Cmb	Solo	Ast	Sck	FF	FR	Yds	Int	Yds	Avg	Lng	TD	PD
2006	NO	3	4	2	2	0.0	0	0	0	0	0	0.0	0	0	1
2007	MIA	4	2	1	1	0.0	0	0	0	0	0	0.0	0	0	0
2008	MIA	1	0	0	0	0.0	0	0	0	0	0	0.0	0	0	0
2009	NE	15	23	14	9	1.0	0	0	0	0	0	0.0	0	0	2
2010	NE	**16**	62	**45**	17	4.0	0	3	**63**	**2**	1	1.0	1	0	4
2011	NE	**16**	74	43	31	6.5	1	3	0	**2**	**30**	**15.0**	**18**	**1**	4
2012	NE	**16**	58	32	26	**8.0**	**5**	**4**	3	0	0	0.0	0	0	1
2013	NE	**16**	**91**	42	**49**	**8.0**	2	2	3	0	0	0.0	0	0	0
2014	NE	**16**	62	**45**	17	**8.0**	0	1	15	1	11	11.0	11	1	2
2015	NE	**16**	52	33	19	6.5	1	1	0	0	0	0.0	0	0	**7**
2016	NE	12	32	17	15	4.0	1	0	0	0	0	0.0	0	0	2
Total		131	460	274	186	46.0	10	14	84	5	42	8.4	18	2	23

=== Postseason ===
Year	Team	GP	Tackles				Fumbles			Interceptions					
Year	Team	GP	Cmb	Solo	Ast	Sck	FF	FR	Yds	Int	Yds	Avg	Lng	TD	PD
2010	NE	1	4	2	2	0.0	0	0	0	0	0	0	0	0	2
2011	NE	3	16	8	8	2.0	1	0	0	0	0	0	0	0	0
2012	NE	2	12	6	6	2.0	0	0	0	1	6	6	6	0	2
2013	NE	2	3	3	0	0.0	0	0	0	0	0	0	0	0	0
2014	NE	3	15	8	7	1.0	0	0	0	0	0	0	0	0	2
2015	NE	2	8	5	3	0.0	0	0	0	0	0	0	0	0	0
2016	NE	3	6	2	4	1.0	0	1	0	0	0	0	0	0	1
Total		16	64	34	30	6.0	1	1	0	1	6	6.0	6	0	7
