= Byron Brown (disambiguation) =

Byron Brown (born 1958) is an American politician and former mayor of Buffalo, New York.

Byron Brown may also refer to:

- Byron D. Brown (1854–1929), American businessman and politician
- Byron Brown (philanthropist) (1866–1947), New Zealand businessman and philanthropist

== See also ==
- Byron Browne (disambiguation)
