= Plagiarism and Literary Property in the Romantic Period =

Non-fiction book by Tilar J. Mazzeo

- Book cover
- Author: Tilar J. Mazzeo
- Subject: History, literature, romantic period, UK
- Genre: Non-fiction
- Publisher: University of Pennsylvania Press
- Publication date: 2007
- Publication place: US
- Media type: Print, ebook
- Pages: 256
- ISBN: 9780812239676
- OCLC: 315523301
- Website: Book Web page

Plagiarism and Literary Property in the Romantic Period is a non-fiction book written by Tilar J. Mazzeo. In the book, Mazzeo shows that Romantic-period ideas surrounding plagiarism are at variance with twentieth-century perceptions. Also, Mazzeo shows that concern about the ethics, legality and morality of plagiarism has its origins during the Romantic era. The book was originally published in 2007 by the University of Pennsylvania Press. At the end of the book is a bibliography, chapter notes, and an index. The book has 115 citations on Google Scholar.

== Chapter titles ==
The chapter titles are as follows, as derived from the table of contents:

1. Romantic Plagiarism and the Critical Inheritance
2. Coleridge, Plagiarism, and Narrative Mastery
3. Property and the Margins of Literary Print Culture
4. "The Slip-Shod Muse": Byron, Originality, and Aesthetic Plagiarism
5. Monstrosities Strung into an Epic: Travel Writing and the Defense of "Modern" Poetry
6. Poaching on the Literary Estate: Class, Improvement, and Enclosure

- There is also a Preface, an Afterword, Notes, and a Bibliography.

== About the author ==
Tilar J. Mazzeo is a cultural historian, American wine author, and author of several bestselling works of narrative nonfiction. She was the Clara C. Piper Associate Professor of English at Colby College in Maine from 2004 to 2019. She is currently Professeure Associée in the Département de Littératures et Langues du Monde at the Université de Montréal in Canada.

In 2006 she released her book Plagiarism and Literary Property in the Romantic Period. Charles McGrath, a reviewer for The New York Times wrote, in part that "...Romantics [as in the Romantic era], [are] supposedly the first generation to conceive of literary ownership in the modern sense, [and] really thought about the issue, according to Tilar J. Mazzeo... In style and methodology, Ms. Mazzeo's new book is an academic wheezer, a retooled dissertation perhaps, but it's also [intelligent] and insightful, and points out that 18th-century writers took a certain amount of borrowing for granted. What mattered was whether you were [underhanded] about it and, even more important, whether you improved upon what you took, by weaving it seamlessly into your own text and adding some new context or insight."

Mazzeo, a U.S.-Canadian dual national, is married to Dr. Robert Miles, a Canadian professor of English. Mazzeo lives in Saanichton, British Columbia. She is the proprietor of and winemaker at Parsell Vineyards. Mazzeo has held previous teaching appointments at the University of Wisconsin, Oregon State University, and the University of Washington. She was the Jenny McKeon Moore Writer in Residence in the Creative Writing and English program at George Washington University from 2010 to 2011. She was the Washington Scholar at Pembroke College, Cambridge, the UK in the late 1990s. She was the editor of digital scholarly editions at Romantic Circles from 2005 to 2019 and has been featured as a preeminent teacher of creative/narrative nonfiction with the Teaching Company / Great Courses.
