= Joliet Junior College =

Public community college in Joliet, Illinois, U.S.

- Type: Public community college
- Established: 1901; 125 years ago
- Endowment: $5.5 million
- President: Clyne G. H. Namuo, Ph.D.
- Faculty: 208 full-time, 558 part-time
- Students: 10,267 Fall 2021
- Location: Joliet, Illinois, United States; 41.50°N 88.18°W
- Campus: Suburban, 273 acres (110.5 ha)
- Colors: Purple and White
- Mascot: Wolves
- Website: www.jjc.edu

Joliet Junior College (JJC) is a public community college in Joliet, Illinois. Founded in 1901, it was the first public community college founded in the United States.

In Spring 2014, the college enrolled 16,375 students. Every year, 48,000 students enroll in the college's academic programs and in non-credit programs.

== History ==
Joliet Junior College was founded in 1901 by J. Stanley Brown, Superintendent of Joliet Township High School, and William Rainey Harper, President of the University of Chicago. Brown, who came to Joliet in 1893, first served as the principal of the high school. Throughout his time in Joliet, Brown became a well-known supporter of higher education, and would often encourage his students to attend college after graduation. Many students did not attend college because it was too expensive. Brown consulted his friend, Harper, and together they created Joliet Junior College. Classes took place at Joliet Township High School. The first class was made up of six students in 1901.

In 1916, the name of the institution was formalized. In 1917, Joliet Junior College received accreditation from the North Central Association of Colleges and Schools. Joliet Junior College's student newspaper, The Blazer, was first published in October 1929. Before The Blazer, college bulletins were reported in the high school paper.

Joliet Junior College moved to its current location, at 1215 Houbolt Road in Joliet, in September 1969. The building at this location became fully operational in 1974. Joliet Junior College's first president, Elmer Rowley, was instrumental in establishing this new building and location.

Today, Joliet Junior College has additional sites in Romeoville, Morris, and Frankfort, all in Illinois.

== Campus locations ==
The college has three campuses and three centers:

- Main Campus, 1215 Houbolt, Joliet, IL 60431
- City Center Campus, 235 North Chicago Street, Joliet, IL 60432
- Romeoville Campus, 1125 W. Romeo Road, Romeoville, IL 60446
- Morris Education Center, 725 School Street, Morris, IL 60450
- Frankfort Education Center, 201 Colorado Avenue, Frankfort, IL 60423
- Weitendorf Agricultural Education Center, 17840 W. Laraway Road, Joliet, IL 60433

== Athletics ==
Joliet Junior College is a member of both the National Junior College Athletic Association (NJCAA) and the North Central Community College Conference.

The school currently sponsors the following sports:
Men's: baseball, basketball, cheerleading, cross-country, and soccer
Women's: basketball, cheerleading, cross-country, soccer, softball, and volleyball.

The 2002 Joliet Wolves football team won the junior college national championship. The football program was eliminated in 2011 after 62 years of play due to budget cuts and to allow the school to be in compliance with Title IX.

=== National championships ===
- NJCAA National Football Championship, 2002
- NJCAA Men's Division III Basketball Championship, 2010, 1994
- NJCAA Division III Baseball National Championship, 2012, 2008, 1994

In 2017 JJC opened a new facility called the Event Center which is home to the athletic department and is used for special events and graduation ceremonies.

== Transportation ==
The main campus of Joliet Junior College in Joliet is served by Pace. Route 501 provides bus service from campus to downtown Joliet and other destinations connecting with Metra service on the Rock Island District and Heritage Corridor at Joliet Transportation Center. Further connections are available to Amtrak service here via the Texas Eagle and Lincoln Service.

== Notable alumni ==
- Katherine Dunham, 1928 - American dancer, choreography, author, educator and social activist
- Dr. John C. Houbolt, 1938 - NASA scientist
- George Sangmeister, 1951 - former Illinois Congressman
- Phyllis Reynolds Tedesco Naylor, 1953 - author of children's books, including Shiloh. 1992 Newbery Medal Winner
- Harry Geris, 1969 - Canadian Olympic wrestler
- Curtis J. Crawford, 1971 - CEO, Xceo Inc.
- Arnette Hallman, 1978 - Professional basketball player
- Kelvin Hayden, 2003 - Professional Football Player with the Chicago Bears
- Rob Ninkovich, 2004 - American football defensive end for the New England Patriots
- Jeris Pendleton, 2008- Professional Football Player with the Jacksonville Jaguars
- Mary K. O'Brien - Illinois state legislator and judge

== See also ==
- Illinois Community College System
