= Jeremy Brown (disambiguation) =

Jeremy Brown (born 1979) is an American former baseball player.

Jeremy Brown may also refer to:

- Jeremy Brown (footballer) (born 1977), New Zealand former footballer
- Jeremy Brown, also known as Mr Brown, the English teacher in Mind Your Language, played by Barry Evans
- Jeremy Brown, guitarist of Scott Weiland and the Wildabouts

== See also ==
- Jeremy Browne (disambiguation)
- Jerry Brown (disambiguation)
