= The Unlikely Ones =

1986 novel by Mary Brown

The Unlikely Ones is a fantasy novel by British writer Mary Brown published in 1986.

== Plot summary ==
The Unlikely Ones is a novel in which 7 "unlikely" heroes go on an epic quest that they believe is only to help relieve them of the curses that a local Witch afflicted on them individually. However, as the tale progresses, they come to find out that it is more of a self-discovery quest.

== Reception ==
David Langford reviewed The Unlikely Ones for White Dwarf #78, and stated that "the book has modest charm and a fresh style, but everything glides along with the happy predictability of a Mills & Boon romance. I'd rate it higher if only there were a few genuine surprises".

== Reviews ==
- Review by Pauline Morgan (1986) in Fantasy Review, June 1986
- Review by Mary Frances Zambreno (1986) in American Fantasy, Fall 1986
- Review by Glenn Reed (1987) in Fantasy Review, January-February 1987
- Review by Faren Miller (1987) in Locus, #312 January 1987
- Review by David V. Barrett (1987) in Vector 136
- Review by Baird Searles (1987) in Isaac Asimov's Science Fiction Magazine, June 1987
- Review by Don D'Ammassa (1988) in Science Fiction Chronicle, #102 March 1988
