= Tilar J. Mazzeo =

American-Canadian cultural historian and writer

Tilar J. Mazzeo is an American-Canadian author and a literary and cultural historian. She is also a wine writer.

== Career ==
Mazzeo was trained as an academic and professor of literary and cultural history. She completed her doctoral work at the University of Washington in Seattle, Washington, in 1999 with joint Ph.D.s in English and from the Program in Theory and Criticism. She was the Washington Scholar at Pembroke College, Cambridge, UK, from 1997 to 1998.

Mazzeo has held previous teaching appointments at the University of Wisconsin, Oregon State University, and the University of Washington. Mazzeo was the Clara C. Piper Associate Professor of English at Colby College in Maine from 2004 until 2019. She was Professeure Associée in the Département de Littératures et Langues du Monde at the Université de Montréal in Canada from 2019 to 2022. From 2022 to 2023 she was a Public Scholar with the National Endowment for the Humanities. Mazzeo currently works full-time as an author.

Mazzeo was the Jenny McKeon Moore writer-in-residence in the Creative Writing and English program at George Washington University from 2010 to 2011. She was the editor of digital scholarly editions at Romantic Circles from 2005 to 2019 and has been featured as a pre-eminent teacher of creative/narrative nonfiction with the Teaching Company / Great Courses.

In 2006, she released her academic monograph Plagiarism and Literary Property in the Romantic Period. It was described by Charles McGrath of the New York Times as "smart and insightful and points out that eighteenth-century writers took a certain amount of borrowing for granted. What mattered was whether you were sneaky about it and, even more important, whether you improved upon what you took, by weaving it seamlessly into your own text and adding some new context or insight." Cited in a 2020 Guardian article on the Led Zeppelin copyright case verdict, Mazzeo's book was called a "seminal study of plagiarism in the Romantic period." Mazzeo continues to work in and lecture on intellectual property law in the international context, especially as related to appellation, geographic brand, and the wine industry.

Her 2008 book The Widow Clicquot is a biography of Barbe-Nicole Clicquot Ponsardin, the eponymous founder of the champagne house Veuve Clicquot. The book was published in by HarperCollins. Described by the New York Times as a "sweeping oenobiography," it became a New York Times and San Francisco Chronicle bestseller and won the Gourmand Award for the Best Work of Wine Writing in the United States in 2009. The book was the basis for the 2023 major motion picture of the same name, directed by Thomas Napper. The role of the Widow Clicquot was played by Haley Bennett. The movie premiered at the Toronto International Film Festival.

Mazzeo went on to become an internationally recognized wine writer and a winemaker. She holds a post-graduate certificate in winemaking from the University of California, Davis, and an advanced certificate with merit (level 3) in Wine and Spirits from the Wine & Spirit Education Trust. She worked as the winemaker at a family winery in Canada from 2015 until 2021. She has taught courses on the wine industry for business and management at the university level on Vancouver Island. Mazzeo's work as a wine writer has appeared in numerous national outlets in the United States, including Food & Wine magazine, Mental Floss, and in the wine guides of which she is the author The Back Lane Wineries of Napa and The Back Lane Wineries of Sonoma (Ten Speed Press). She writes a monthly wine column for Seaside, a west coast cultural magazine, and lectures internationally on wine.

In 2009, Mazzeo informally studied perfume making with Ron Winnegrad at International Flavors and Fragrances in New York City. In 2010 Mazzeo's book The Secret of Chanel No. 5: The Biography of a Scent was published by Harper. The Wall Street Journal interviewed Mazzeo following the publication of the book, and the book was featured on National Public Radio's "All Things Considered" and the Canadian Broadcast Corporation's "Ideas" program. The work was reviewed in the New York Times, which described it as "a biography of Coco Chanel as seen through the prism of her famous square flacon." On the vexed question of Coco Chanel's collaboration with fascism during the German occupation of Paris, Mazzeo's research concludes that, although Chanel clearly attempted to have the company "Aryanized" during the war and did collaborate with aspects of Vichy France, there is also some good archival evidence to suggest that she and her German paramour were working with Allied intelligence, as Chanel later claimed.

In 2014 Mazzeo's book, The Hotel on Place Vendôme, the story of the Hôtel Ritz Paris during Nazi occupation, was released with Harper, further delving into the topic of networks of resistance and collaboration at the iconic hotel in the wartime period. It became a New York Times bestseller in travel writing and was a Los Angeles Times bestseller for more than 20 weeks. The book was published in France as Le Ritz sous l'Occupation by Éditions Vuibert and Mazzeo was interviewed about the release of the book in France in Le Figaro.

In 2016, Simon and Schuster published Irena's Children, the story of Polish social worker Irena Sendler, whose efforts prevented the death of thousands of Jewish children during World War II. Mazzeo interviewed more than a half-dozen child survivors of the Warsaw Ghetto in the process of writing the book. The book was the winner of the 2018 Western Canada Jewish Book Award. The book was adapted by Scholastic as an award-winning title for middle-school readers. Irena's Children has been translated into more than a half-dozen languages and editions.

In 2018, Mazzeo published a biography of Eliza Hamilton, the wife of American Founding Father, Alexander Hamilton, with Simon & Schuster / Gallery. Mazzeo was able to obtain access to the family letters and records of the Schuyler family prior to the auction at Sotheby's in 2017 that dispersed the collection, and those materials led Mazzeo to question whether Alexander Hamilton's self-proclaimed affair with Maria Reynolds, popularized in Hamilton: The Musical, ever took place or whether, as Hamilton's political opponents alleged, the "affair" was meant to hide a financial scandal.

In 2022, Grand Central published a non-fiction book based on the history of the "Ciano Diaries". Sisters in Resistance recounts the history of three women who helped to save evidence of German war crimes and passed them to the Allies for use at Nuremberg. Kirkus Reviews wrote that "Mazzeo's probing book delves intriguingly into the 'moral thicket' into which a group of strangers found themselves plunged during the long, dark days of World War II". The Times Literary Supplement called the book a "thrilling historical drama tightly focused on the fate of the diaries after Ciano's fall from grace."

The Sea Captain’s Wife, a biography of the nineteenth-century mariner Mary Ann Patten, the first woman to command a merchant vessel in the United States, was published in 2025 by St. Martin’s Press. Patten took over from her stricken sea-captain husband as the clipper ship, Neptune's Car, was transiting Cape Horn, captained the vessel through a weeks' long storm and icebergs in Drake's Passage in the 1850s. The books was described by Kirkus as "A rip-roaring, seafaring adventure with a twist. Mazzeo has fashioned a captivating role-reversal tale [about how], for the first time ever, a woman became captain of a merchant ship―with the crew’s approval. A thoroughly entertaining, delightful story.” Reviewing the book for the Wall Street Journal, Bill Heavey called the tale of Mary Ann Patten "undeniably one of the greatest stories of a bygone era." The Sea Captain’s Wife was included in a list of new and notable books for December 2025 by The New York Times.

Mazzeo has worked as a developmental editor, and her book on how academics and other fact-based experts can write bestselling public-interest titles for large audiences, How to Write a Bestseller, was published by Yale University Press in 2024.

Her forthcoming book The Green Dragon Tavern, an account of the men and women, Loyalist and Patriot, who gathered at the Green Dragon Tavern and shaped the history of the Boston Tea Party, was announced in Publishers Marketplace in January 2025. The book is scheduled for publication in 2027 by St. Martin's Press.
