= Martin Brown =

Martin Brown may refer to:

- Martin Brown (writer) (1884–1936), Canadian-born American playwright, screenwriter, and actor
- Martin Brown (footballer) (1900–1988), Australian rules footballer for South Melbourne
- Martin Brown (cancer biologist) (fl. 1963–2007), British scientist
- Martin Brown, producer of films including Moulin Rouge!
- Martin Brown (died 1968), victim of English 11-year-old killer Mary Bell
- Martin Brown, Australian cartoonist and illustrator known for Horrible Histories

== See also ==
- Marty Brown (disambiguation)
- Martin Browne (disambiguation)
