= Gerry Brown (disambiguation) =

Gerry Brown (born 1958) is an American recording engineer.

Gerry Brown may also refer to

- Gerry Brown (ice hockey) (1917–1998), Canadian professional ice hockey player
- Gerry Brown (drummer) (born 1951), American jazz drummer
- E. Gerry Brown, American journalist and politician
- Gerry Brown, American soccer player in the American Soccer League (1933–83)

== See also ==
- Gerry Browne (disambiguation)
- Jerry Brown (disambiguation)
- Gerald Brown (disambiguation)
