= Reggie Brown =

Reggie Brown may refer to:

- Reggie Brown (American football coach) (1876–1961), American college football coach at Boston University from 1926 to 1929
- Reginald J. Brown (1940–2005), U.S. Assistant Secretary of the Army (Manpower and Reserve Affairs)
- Reggie Brown (fullback) (born 1973), American football player
- Reggie Brown (impersonator) (born 1980), comedic impersonator known for Barack Obama impersonations
- Reggie Brown (linebacker) (born 1974), American football player
- Reggie Brown (wide receiver, born 1970), American football player
- Reggie Brown (wide receiver) (born 1981), American football player
- Reggie Brown (running back) (born 1960), American football player
- Reggie Brown (Snapchat), internet entrepreneur who co-founded Snapchat
- Tre Brown (born 1997), American football player

== See also ==
- Reginald Browne (disambiguation)
