= 2002 Joliet Wolves football team =

American college football season

2002 Joliet Wolves football

NJCAA National Football Championship

Golden Isles Bowl, W 24-14 vs. Georgia Military College
- Conference: North Central Community College Conference
- Record: 11–0 (8–0 N4C)
- Head coach: Bob MacDougall (3rd season)

The 2002 Joliet Wolves football team was an American football team that represented Joliet Junior College as a member of the North Central Community College Conference (N4C) during the 2002 junior college football season. In their third year under head coach Bob MacDougall, the Wolves compiled an 11–0 record (8–0 in conference games), won the N4C championship, and defeated Georgia Military College in the Golden Isles Bowl for the NJCAA National Football Championship. The team extended its winning streak to 21 games, which at the time was the longest in the nation.

The team's statistical leaders included DuJuan Johnson with 798 rushing yards, Jim Peyton with 2,251 passing yards and 25 passing touchdowns, and ·Kelvin Hayden with 1,297 receiving yards. Linebacker Rob Ninkovich later played 11 seasons in the National Football League. Defensive end John Chrestman set a school record with 15 sacks for Joliet during the 2002 season.

== Schedule ==
Date	Opponent	Site	Result	Source
August 31	at Harper	Palatine, IL	W 30–7	
September 7	Rock Valley	Joliet, IL	W 38–8	
September 14	DuPage	Joliet, IL	W 34–0	
September 22	at Illinois Wesleyan JV*	Bloomington, IL	W 45–14	
September 28	Grand Rapids	Joliet, IL	W 44–12	
October 5	at Rock Valley	Rockford, IL	W 58–7	
October 12	at DuPage	Glen Ellyn, IL	W 37–14	
October 18	Air Force JV*	Joliet, IL	W 35–6	
October 26	at Grand Rapids	Grand Rapids, MI	W 24–14	
November 2	Harper	Joliet, IL	W 29–15	
December 7	vs. Georgia Military College*	Glynn County Stadium; Brunswick, GA (Golden Isles Bowl)	W 24–14	
*Non-conference game
