= Harry Browne (disambiguation) =

Harry Browne (1933–2006) was an American investment analyst and political writer.

Harry Browne may also refer to:

- Harry Browne (cricketer) (1874–1944), English first-class cricketer and British Indian Army officer
- Harry C. Browne (1878–1954), American banjo player and actor
