= Reginald Browne =

Reginald Browne may refer to:

- Reginald Spencer Browne (1856–1943), Australian WWI Brigadier General, journalist and newspaper editor
- Edwy Searles Brooks (1889–1965), British novelist who used a number of pseudonyms, including Reginald Browne

== See also ==
- Reggie Brown (disambiguation)
