= Byron Browne =

Byron Browne may refer to:

- Byron Browne (baseball) (born 1942), American baseball outfielder
- Byron Browne (artist) (1907–1961), American painter

== See also ==
- Byron Brown (disambiguation)
