= Mary Brown (author) =

British author (1929–1999)

Mary Brown (1929 – 20 December 1999) was a British author of science fiction and fantasy stories, including The Unlikely Ones.

== Published books ==
Pigs Don't Fly

- The Unlikely Ones (1986)
- Pigs Don't Fly (1994)
- Master of Many Treasures (1995)
- Dragonne's Eg (1999)

Omnibus eds.: The Unexpected Dragon (1999, #2-4, OCLC 43478531); Here There Be Dragonnes (2003, #1-3; OCLC 51003777)

Other

- Mr. Sin (1970), OCLC 220896756
- Playing the Jack (1984) – set in 1785, OCLC 10995826
- The Heart Has Its Reasons (1992) – sequel to Playing the Jack?
- Strange Deliverance (1997)
