= Mary Willcox Brown Glenn =

American social worker (1869-1940)

- Born: Mary Willcox Brown; December 14, 1869; Baltimore, Maryland, U.S.
- Died: November 3, 1940 (aged 70); New York City, U.S.
- Spouse: John Mark Glenn (m. 1902)

Mary Willcox Brown Glenn (1869–1940) was an American social worker. She is known for her involvement with the Charity Organization Society of Baltimore and the Family Welfare Association of America.

Glenn née Brown was born in Baltimore, Maryland on December 14, 1869. She began her career in social reform work at the Henry Watson Children's Aid Society of Baltimore. At the turn of the century she worked for the Baltimore Charity Organization Society. She was an early advocate of social case work and the ideas of Mary Richmond.

In 1902 she married fellow Baltimorean and social reformer, John Mark Glenn. Glenn (1858-1950) served as a director of the Russell Sage Foundation. The couple settled in New York City where she was director of the Russell Sage Foundation’s Charity Organization Department.

Glenn co founded the National Association of Societies for Organizing Charity (now the Family Welfare Association of America).

She died on November 3, 1940, in New York City.
