= Christopher Steven Brown =

American music executive

- Occupation: Music executive

Christopher Steven Brown (also known as CB and Chris Brown) is an American music executive.

== Career ==
After graduating from the Connecticut School of Broadcasting, Brown began his career as a former executive of Citadel Communications. In 2014 and 2015 Brown was the co-host of the Home and Castle Television series.

Brown served as the Senior National Director of Pop at Sony Music.

Some of Brown's credits include multi-platinum awards.

In March 2020, Brown was nominated in the "Indy Record Executive" category of the WorldWide Radio Summit awards. The award was won by Daniel Glass from Glassnote Music.
