= Springboard Community Services =

Private, nonsectarian social services agency

- Formation: May 2, 1942; 84 years ago
- Merger of: Family Welfare Association, Maryland Society to Protect Children from Cruelty and Immorality and Family Welfare, Henry Watson Children's Aid Society of Baltimore, Shelter for Aged and Infirm Colored Persons of Baltimore City, The Electric Sewing Machine Society of Baltimore City, and Maryland Children's and Family Services
- Tax ID no.: 52-0591546
- Legal status: 501(c)(3) nonprofit organization
- Headquarters: Baltimore, Maryland, United States
- Region served: Anne Arundel County, Baltimore City, Baltimore County, Carroll County, Harford County, and Howard County
- Services: To provide targeted services to vulnerable families and individuals in all stages of life who are experiencing problems related to social and personal adjustment, thereby enhancing their quality of life.
- President: Lisa H. R. Hayes
- Chief Executive Officer: F.T. Burden
- Subsidiaries: FCS MD LLC
- Revenue: $6,821,382 (2014)
- Expenses: $7,377,343 (2014)
- Endowment: $1,913,034
- Employees: 304 (2013)
- Volunteers: 438 (2013)
- Website: www.springboardmd.org
- Formerly called: Family & Children's Services of Central Maryland

Family and Children's Services of Central Maryland, Inc. doing business as Springboard Community Services (SCS), formerly Family and Children's Services (FCS), is a private, nonsectarian social services agency that was founded in 1849. SCS addresses issues from birth through the end of life with a goal to build self-confidence, resilience and hope. SCS is a 501(c)(3) non-profit organization.

== Services ==
SCS offers counseling, case management, training, and recruitment of foster families and community volunteers for vulnerable populations, including:

- Medically fragile infants (exposed to drugs, alcohol or HIV)
- Victims of child sexual abuse
- Victims of domestic violence and their children
- At-risk adolescents
- Young parents without a high school degree or job skills
- Families dealing with AIDS
- Low-income families and seniors
- Seniors with dementia and the adult disabled

Some services are offered without charge; others are offered on a sliding-fee scaled based on income. Participation in some programs is court-ordered.

In fiscal year 2008, FCS served 8,000 families and individuals in Central Maryland.

== Locations ==
As of 2008 there were 13 FCS offices located in Baltimore City and the surrounding counties of Anne Arundel, Baltimore, Carroll, Harford, and Howard. Some services are offered in the home or in community settings. Although general counseling and in-home assistance for the elderly and adult disabled are available throughout Central Maryland, not all services are offered in all jurisdictions.

SCS operates domestic violence programs in Baltimore and Carroll counties, and adult day centers in Carroll and Harford counties. Some specialized programs, such as the After School AKAdemy, Children's Permanency Program, Supervised Visitation and Exchange Program and Family Support Center, are only available in one location or area.

== Accreditation and recognition ==
SCS is accredited by the Council on Accreditation (COA), an independent, international accrediting body for child and family service and behavioral healthcare organizations. COA accredits both private organizations and government agencies.

In 2004 and 2005, the United Way honored FCS for its development of outcome models to measure the impact of its programs.

The Coalition of Geriatric Services (COGS) in Howard County, Maryland, awarded Family and Children's Services the Community Partnership Award in 2004. In Baltimore City, the Commission on Aging and Retirement Education presented the Barbara Mikulski Caregiver Award to FCS in 2005.

In 2008, the Family Caregiver Alliance issued the Rosalinde Gilbert Innovations in Alzheimer's Disease Caregiver Legacy Award to the FCS Carroll County Adult Day Center for its Montessori-based exercise program for clients with mild to moderate dementia.

== History ==
The organization known as Family and Children's Services of Central Maryland was the result of a combination of predecessor agencies dating back to 1849.

- 1849: Association for the Improvement of the Condition of the Poor (AICP)
- 1860: Children's Aid Society of Baltimore
- 1876: Name changed to Henry Watson Children's Aid Society (HWCAS)
- 1878: Society for the Protection of Children from Cruelty and Immorality (SPCCI)
- 1881: Charity Organization Society (COS)
- 1881: Shelter for Aged and Infirm Colored Persons (SAICP)
- 1891: Electric Sewing Machine Society (ESMS)
- 1910: Federated Charities (FC) formed by merger of Association for the Improvement of the Condition of the Poor and Charity Organization Society
- 1919: Name changed to Family Welfare Association (FWA)
- 1942: Family and Children's Society formed by merger of Family Welfare Association and Henry Watson Children's Aid Society
- 1943: Maryland Society to Protect Children from Cruelty and Immorality merged with the Family and Children's Society
- 1943: Shelter for Aged and Infirm Colored Persons merged with the Family and Children's Society
- 1945: Electric Sewing Machine Society of Baltimore City merged with the Family and Children's Society

The records from FCS predecessor agencies can be found in the Special Collections section of The Milton S. Eisenhower Library, The Johns Hopkins University (Ms. 360). Much of the content below is taken, with permission, from the archives.

Charity organizations began developing at a time when a major demographic shift was occurring in American society. As industrialization began to replace an agrarian economy, many citizens left their rural communities only to find themselves unprepared to deal with urban life. Later events in the nation's history, including wars and the Depression, also caused similar de-stabilization in the society. Effects of society in transition are most affecting to those without adequate economic resources. Poverty, illness, addictions, and desertions left families bereft of shelter, food, and fuel.

FCS is one of only nine social services organizations in Central Maryland to have earned accreditation by the Council on Accreditation (COA), an independent, international accrediting body for child and family service and behavioral healthcare organizations.

Early reformers saw a correlation between morality and the economic condition, but as the work with clients advanced, these assumptions were challenged. As the theory and practice of social work evolved, new approaches were used to solve the problems of welfare.

In the mid-nineteenth century, Baltimore Mayor Elijah Stansbury Jr. called for delegates from each of the city's wards to meet and plan for an efficient relief administration. The result was the formation of the Association for the Improvement of the Condition of the Poor (AICP) in 1849. The AICP was the third organization of its kind in the United States (after New York City and Brooklyn, NY).

In 1881, Daniel Coit Gilman, president of The Johns Hopkins University, helped to found the Charity Organization Society (COS) modeled on a similar agency in Boston. Its purpose was not to give relief per se but to combine and develop all the charitable resources in the community into a single agency. Service to the client might include a referral to another agency, church, or individual, and it usually included the concept of "friendly visiting" to give personal service in a client's home "to promote health, thrift, and to build up character." Among the COS members were Amos Griswald Warner, Mary E. Richmond, Mary Willcox Brown Glenn, John M. Glenn, and Dr. Jeffrey R. Brackett, and each one became known nationally for contributions to the development and practice of social work.

Other agencies founded during this period provided specialized services for particular groups: children, women, the African American population. After several decades it was recognized that combined resources and an allocation of public funds were necessary. This began a series of mergers.

The AICP and the COS were instrumental in bringing about legislation creating the Juvenile Court, compulsory school attendance laws, non-support laws, child labor laws, and licensing for boarding infants. The two agencies were formally incorporated as the Federated Charities (FC) in 1910. In 1911, the Legal Aid Bureau was organized as a department of the FC and remained so until it was separated as a single agency in 1929. During this period (c. 1900–1920), charity funding also became specialized and was administered by a single agency, the Baltimore Alliance (succeeded by the Community Chest in 1926).

In 1919, Federated Charities voted to change the name to Family Welfare Association. The primary goals of FC would be service to the family, including "securing medical treatment, finding employment, searching for missing husbands, straightening out domestic difficulties, instruction in household economics, and strengthening connections with church and relatives." Persons prominent in the Association during this period include Gaylord Lee Clark, Anna D. Ward, Doris Slothower, and Dorothy Pope.

Rehabilitative services were put aside during the early years of the Depression as the Agency struggled to aid families and at the same time to get the City and State to assume some responsibility. Gaylord Lee Clark, president of FWA in 1929, called upon the Governor to appoint a Commission to investigate the social welfare needs of the State. Along with the implementation of federal programs, this led to the present Maryland State Department of Welfare. When the Baltimore Emergency Relief Commission was set up in 1933 with a pipeline to federal funds, the FWA moved to resume its function, "the promotion of adequate family life through casework service."

Social work as a profession was advanced in the 1930s. Caseworkers began exploring new ideas regarding the psychology of human behavior, and community psychiatric services were tried.

In 1940, the Community Fund recommended a merger of four agencies. The Henry Watson Children's Aid Society and the FWA merged in 1942 (Annual Report, 1942). Briefly known as the Family Welfare and Henry Watson Children's Aid Society of Baltimore, the name more popularly was known as the Family and Children's Society. Final mergers joined the Society for the Protection of Children from Cruelty and Immorality and the Shelter for Aged and Infirm Colored Persons in 1943.

The Family and Children's Society emerged in 1943 as a multi-service agency. The Society's service to families was expanded to include medical, foster care, housekeeping, marriage counseling, adoptions, home finding, group counseling, and community mental health.

In 1985, the Family and Children's Society merged with the Maryland Children's and Family Services and is now known as the Family and Children's Services of Central Maryland. In 1998, the Family Life Center, in Howard County, merged with FCS. In 2020, FCS changed its name to Springboard Community Services.

== See also ==
- Child and family services
