= Jerry B. Brown =

Anthropologist known for studying psychedelics

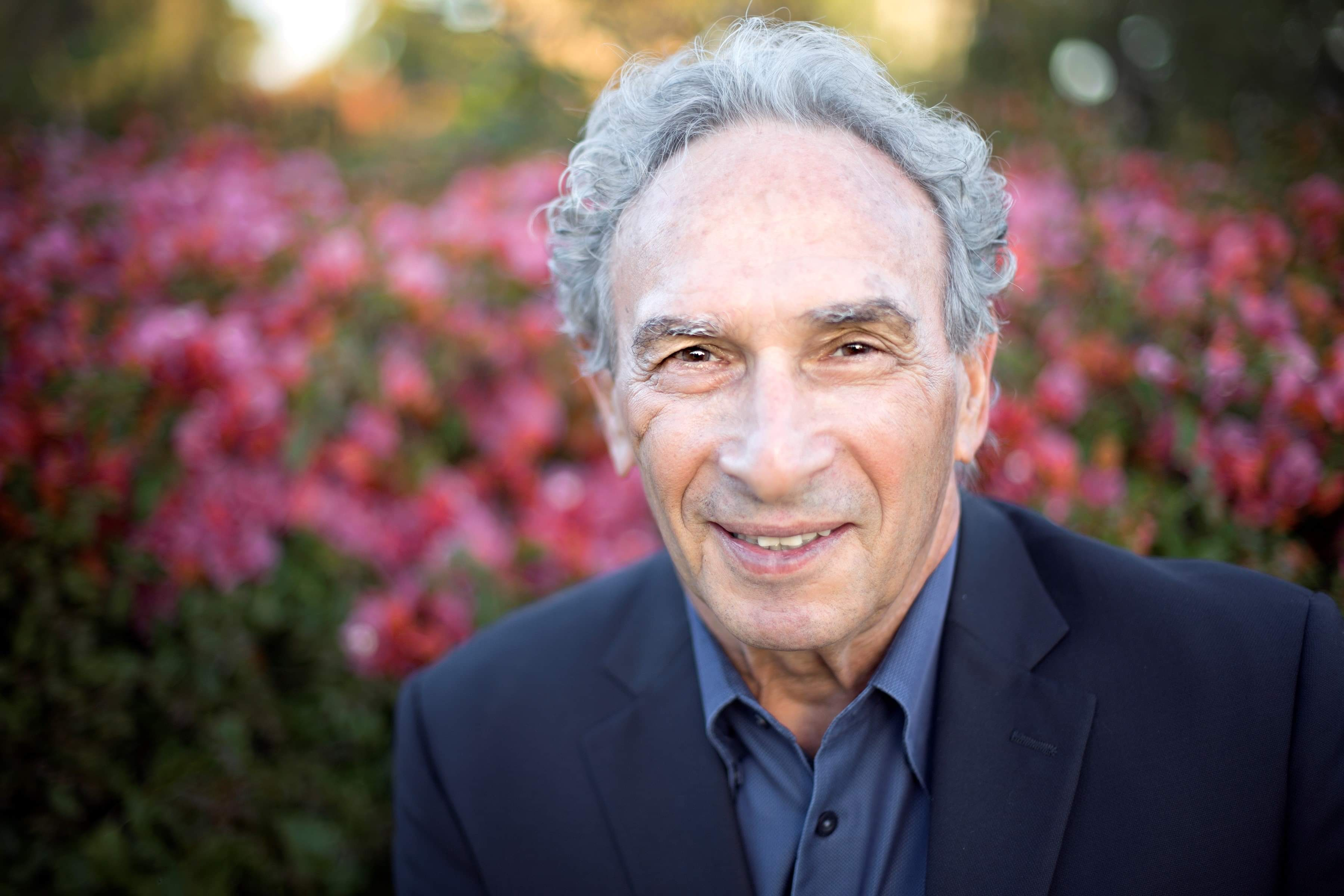
- Born: November 9, 1942 (age 83)
- Education: Antioch College (BA), Cornell University (PhD)
- Occupations: Anthropologist, Ethnomycologist
- Spouse: Julie Brown
- Website: psychedelicgospels.com

Jerry B. Brown (born November 9, 1942, in Paterson, New Jersey) is an anthropologist and ethnomycologist.

== Education and early career ==
In 1965, Brown graduated from Antioch College with a B.A. degree in Philosophy and Religion and received his doctorate degree in Anthropology from Cornell University in 1972. From 1972 through 2014, he served as founding professor of anthropology at Florida International University (FIU) in Miami.

== Cesar Chavez and the United Farm Workers ==
From 1968 to 1971, Brown conducted field work on the California farm workers movement for his dissertation at Cornell. In fall 1968, he co-coordinated the national grape boycott from the United Farm Workers (UFW) headquarters in Delano, California.

Brown conducted a city-by-city analysis of the impact of the national grape boycott, based on U.S. Department of Agriculture weekly reports of table grape shipments to 41 North American cities. He also coordinated an international boycott which resulted in blockades of California grapes by longshoremen on the docks of London, England and Malmo, Sweden. His work was documented in the 2012 book From the Jaws of Victory: The Triumph and Tragedy of Cesar Chavez and the Farm Worker Movement by Matt Garcia.

In 1972, Brown wrote his doctoral dissertation for Cornell University on The United Farm Workers Grape Strike and Boycott, 1965-1970: An Evaluation of the Culture of Poverty Theory.

== Nuclear power activism and research ==
In 1979 Brown founded Floridians United for Safe Energy (FUSE). In 1983, the organization intervened before the Florida Public Service Commission to prevent Florida Power and Light Company (FPL) from charging ratepayers $500 million for the replacement of corroded steam generators at the Turkey Point nuclear generating station near Miami, Florida.

From 1998-2003, he was a Research Associate with the Radiation and Public Health Project (RPHP), coordinating the national baby teeth study (also known as the "Tooth Fairy Project"). It found an unexpected increase in Sr-90 in U.S. baby teeth, suggesting that "it is likely that, 40 years after large-scale atmospheric atomic bomb tests ended, much of the current in-body radioactivity represents nuclear reactor emissions."

From 2013 to 2018, Brown directed the World Business Academy’s Safe Energy Project, with a goal of causing the closure of California’s remaining nuclear power plants and to accelerate the state’s transition to 100 percent renewable energy in ten years through the "California Moonshot Project".

== Ethnomycology ==
In 1975 Brown designed an annual course on "Psychedelics and Culture" at Florida International University. As a researcher, he has pursued historical images of psychedelic mushrooms in Christian art. In 2006, he discovered an image of the psychoactive Amanita muscaria mushroom sculpted into the forehead of a Green Man in Rosslyn Chapel, a fifteenth century Church in Scotland. Mycologist Paul Stamets confirmed that this was a “taxonomically correct Amanita muscaria.”

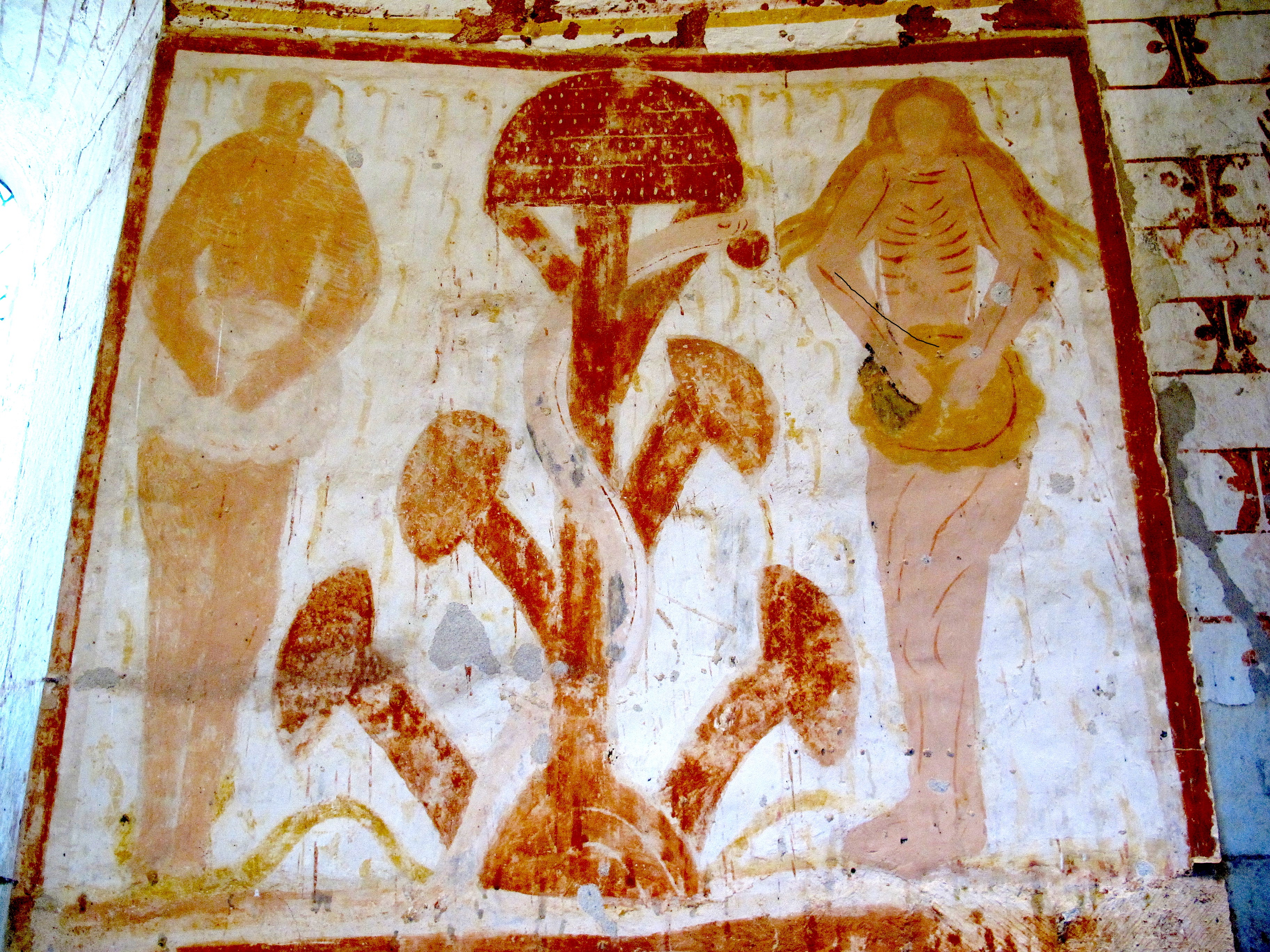
Temptation in the Garden of Eden, Chapel of Plaincourault, France, c. 1291.

Expanding on ethnomycologist R. Gordon Wasson’s theory of the entheogenic origins of religion, Brown’s 2016 book, The Psychedelic Gospels: The Secret History of Hallucinogens in Christianity hypothesizes that Christianity has a psychedelic history.

== Books ==
- Jerry B. Brown and Rinaldo S. Brutoco, Profiles in Power: The Anti-Nuclear Movement and the Dawn of the Solar Age. New York, New York: Twayne/Simon & Schuster Macmillan, 1997. [ISBN 978-0805738797]
- Jerry B. Brown, Rinaldo S. Brutoco, et al., Freedom from Mid-East Oil. San Francisco, California: World Business Academy, 2007. [ISBN 978-0979405228]
- Jerry B. Brown and Julie M. Brown, The Psychedelic Gospels: The Secret History of Hallucinogens in Christianity. Rochester, Vermont: Park Street Press, 2016. [ISBN 978-1620555026]
