= Rose Browne =

- Born: March 19, 1897; Boston, Massachusetts, U.S.
- Died: December 1, 1986 (aged 89); Providence, Rhode Island, U.S.
- Education: Rhode Island State College; Rhode Island College of Education; Harvard University (PhD)
- Occupations: Educator; engineer; author
- Parent(s): John R. Butler; Hannah F. McClenney
- Relatives: Kim Davis (granddaughter)

Rose Butler Browne (March 19, 1897 – December 1, 1986) was an American educator, engineer and author of Love My Children. In 1939 she became the first black woman to gain a PhD in education from Harvard University.

== Life ==
Rose Butler Browne was born in Boston, Massachusetts, on March 19, 1897, the daughter of John R. Butler, a brickmason and Hannah F. McClenney, who worked at a laundry. Her maternal great-grandmother, Charlotte Ann Elizabeth Lindsey, was a daughter of a native American chief who married a southern slave, worked six years to buy his freedom and later migrated to a Boston ghetto to improve the life of their children. In her autobiography Love My Children, Browne attributed most of her success to the influence of her great-grandmother, called the "High Priestess" by her family.

She moved with her family to Newport, Rhode Island, where she grew up, attending Shiloh Baptist Church. While working as a live-in domestic she earned a bachelor's degree at Rhode Island State College (now the University of Rhode Island). She went on to earn her master's degree at Rhode Island College of Education (now Rhode Island College) and then to Harvard University where, in 1939 she became the first black woman to earn a doctoral degree in education. In 1950, she received an honorary degree from Rhode Island College. Browne was a member of Alpha Kappa Alpha sorority.

Dr. Browne taught for many years at Virginia State University and North Carolina College. She was devoted to improving education for minority children. Dr. Browne served on the facilities of Virginia State College, West Virginia State College, and Bluefield State College in West Virginia before becoming chairman of the education department at North Carolina College. A crusader for black rights, Dr. Browne once refused to send students into teaching jobs in West Virginia as long as State Board of Education continued paying black teachers lower salaries than white teachers. The publicity and subsequent shortage of teachers forced the board to alter its policies.

After retiring in 1963, Dr. Browne operated a day care center for children at the Mt. Vernon Baptist Church in Durham, where her husband was the pastor. Returning to Rhode Island, she operated a summer school aimed at the culture gap faced by black children, and later worked with senior citizens.

In 1969 a seven-story Rhode Island College residence hall was named in her honor. After an extended illness, Browne died on December 1, 1986, in Providence, Rhode Island. She is buried in Durham, North Carolina. A leadership class and mentoring program offered through the Center for Leadership Development at the University of Rhode Island is named in her honor.

Her granddaughter is Kim Davis.

== Works ==
- Browne, Rose Butler. Love My Children: an Autobiography. New York: Meredith Press, 1969.
