= Chris Brown (cricketer, born 1974) =

English cricketer

Personal information
- Full name: Christopher Brown
- Born: 16 August 1974 (age 52); Oldham, Greater Manchester
- Batting: Right-handed
- Bowling: Right-arm off-break
- Role: Bowler

Domestic team information
- Years: Team
- 2000: Cheshire
- 2001–2018: Norfolk
- 2005/06: Badureliya Sports Club
- 2010: Unicorns
- FC debut: 14 January 2006 Badureliya v Burgher Recreation Club
- Last FC: 5 February 2006 Badureliya v Chilaw Marians
- LA debut: 15 May 2001 Norfolk v Wales
- Last LA: 29 August 2010 Unicorns v Worcestershire

Career statistics
Competition	First-class	List A
Matches	4	9
Runs scored	45	88
Batting average	9.00	17.60
100s/50s	0/0	0/0
Top score	21	33
Balls bowled	366	412
Wickets	6	7
Bowling average	27.16	43.14
5 wickets in innings	0	0
10 wickets in match	0	0
Best bowling	2/10	2/39
Catches/stumpings	2/–	3/–
- Source: CricInfo, 27 May 2018

Christopher Brown (born 16 August 1974) is an English cricketer who was part of a highly successful Lancashire County Cricket Club playing staff in the mid-1990s and was the captain of Norfolk County Cricket Club from 2013 until 2018. Brown moved to Norfolk in 2001 and was subsequently voted player of the year in 2001, 2003, 2011 & 2016 due to his performances for the eastern county. He has won 5 man of the match awards for Norfolk CCC and also won the MCCA (now NCCA) Frank Edwards Trophy in 2016 at Lords, presented to him by the current ECB Chairman at that time, Colin Graves . He has also played first-class cricket in Sri Lanka and List A cricket for both Norfolk and Unicorns. He was born at Oldham in Greater Manchester in 1974.

Having been educated at Failsworth School, Brown was a contracted professional from 1994 to 1997 with his local first class team Lancashire, receiving his 2nd XI cap in 1997. Brown made his List A debut for Norfolk in the 2001 C&G Trophy and played six matches for them over three seasons, winning his county cap in 2001.

In 2006, Brown also played first-class cricket overseas, playing for Sri Lankan team Badureliya Sports Club. From 2006 Brown played in the East Anglian Premier Cricket League for Horsford Cricket Club.

Having played for Minor Counties representative teams, Brown was selected as one of 21 players to form the first Unicorns squad to take part in the 2010 Clydesdale Bank 40 domestic limited overs competition against the regular first-class counties.

Brown, an ECB Level IV coach, has also had spells as a spin consultant with Zimbabwe during the 2018 ICC World Cup qualifiers and with Cricket Scotland. In 2024 he joined Cricket Ireland as the organisation's high performance spin bowling coach.
