= Jeremy Browne (disambiguation) =

Jeremy Browne (born 1970) is a British politician.

Jeremy Browne may also refer to:

- Jeremy Browne, 11th Marquess of Sligo (1939–2014)

== See also ==
- Jeremy Brown (disambiguation)
