= Chris Brown (field hockey) =

New Zealand field hockey player (born 1960)

Personal information
- Born: Christopher Effield Brown; 30 January 1960 (age 66) Auckland, New Zealand
- Height: 1.74 m (5 ft 9 in)
- Weight: 65 kg (143 lb)

Sport
- Country: New Zealand
- Sport: Field hockey

Christopher Effield Brown (born 30 January 1960) is a former New Zealand field hockey player. He was a member of the national men's team that finished seventh at the 1984 Summer Olympics in Los Angeles. He was born in Auckland, and was first selected for the New Zealand national team in 1983.
