= Lucille Baldwin Brown =

American librarian (1922–2019)

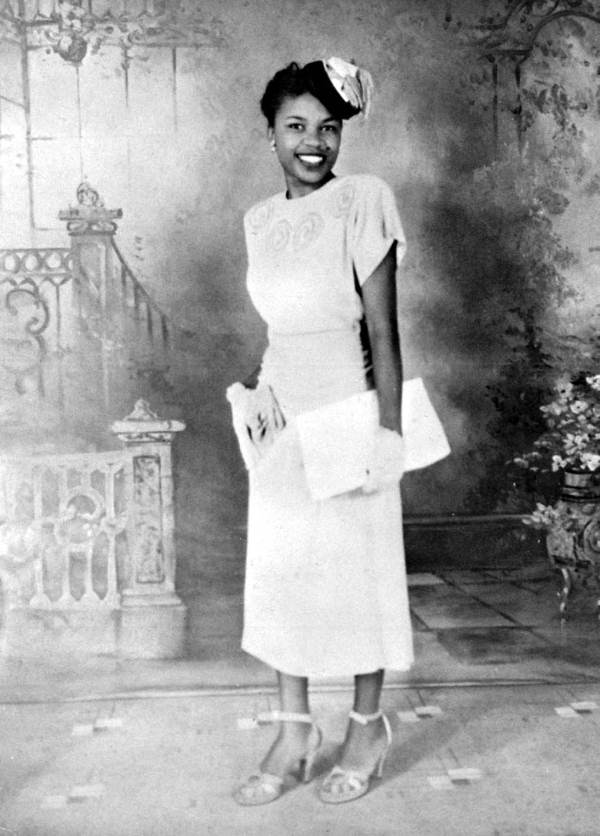
- Brown c. 1940
- Born: May 15, 1922; Tallahassee, Florida
- Died: August 17, 2019 (aged 97); Tallahassee, Florida
- Occupation: librarian

Lucille Baldwin Holliday Brown (May 15, 1922 - August 17, 2019) was an American librarian known for being the first Black public county librarian in the state of Florida. During segregation she led a campaign for a library for Leon County's black residents. That library was housed in a local school, Lincoln High School.

She worked primarily in school libraries in Leon County, working in Griffin High School and Bond Elementary (then a junior high school). Later in her career she worked night shifts at the Northwood Mall's public library. She served as the membership chair for the Florida division of the American Association of School Libraries.

Brown was born to Mr. and Mrs. Dallis Baldwin on Suwannee Street in the Smoky Hollow community of Tallahassee, Florida, one of ten children. She was a charter member of Sigma Gamma Rho. She was married to George (Rabbit) Holliday in 1941, they had one son, Lee Duval Holliday. After he died in 1975, she married James Brown in 1979.
