= Chris Brown (dancer) =

Native American dancer and costume maker

Chris Brown performing as Chief Lemme in 1950

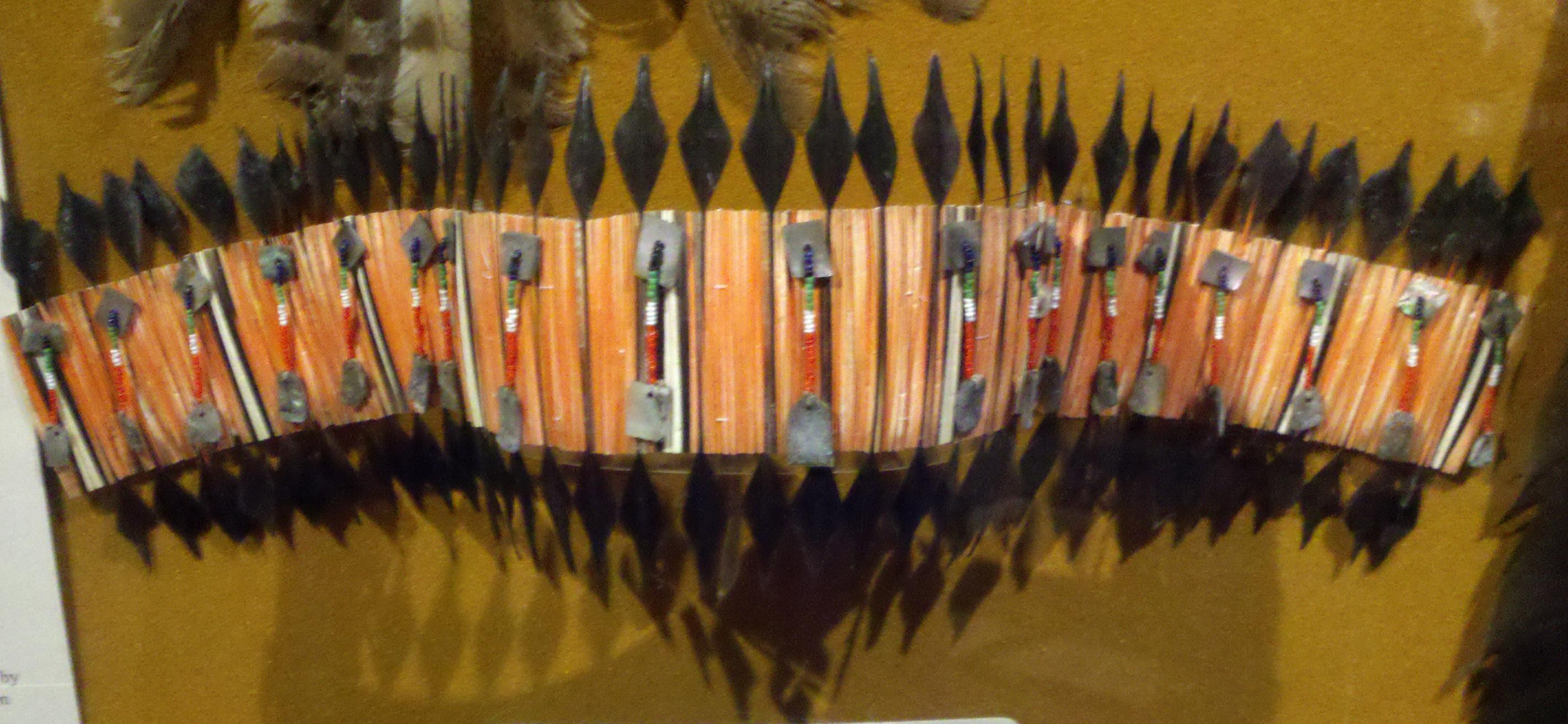
A flicker quill headband made by Chris Brown ca. 1930

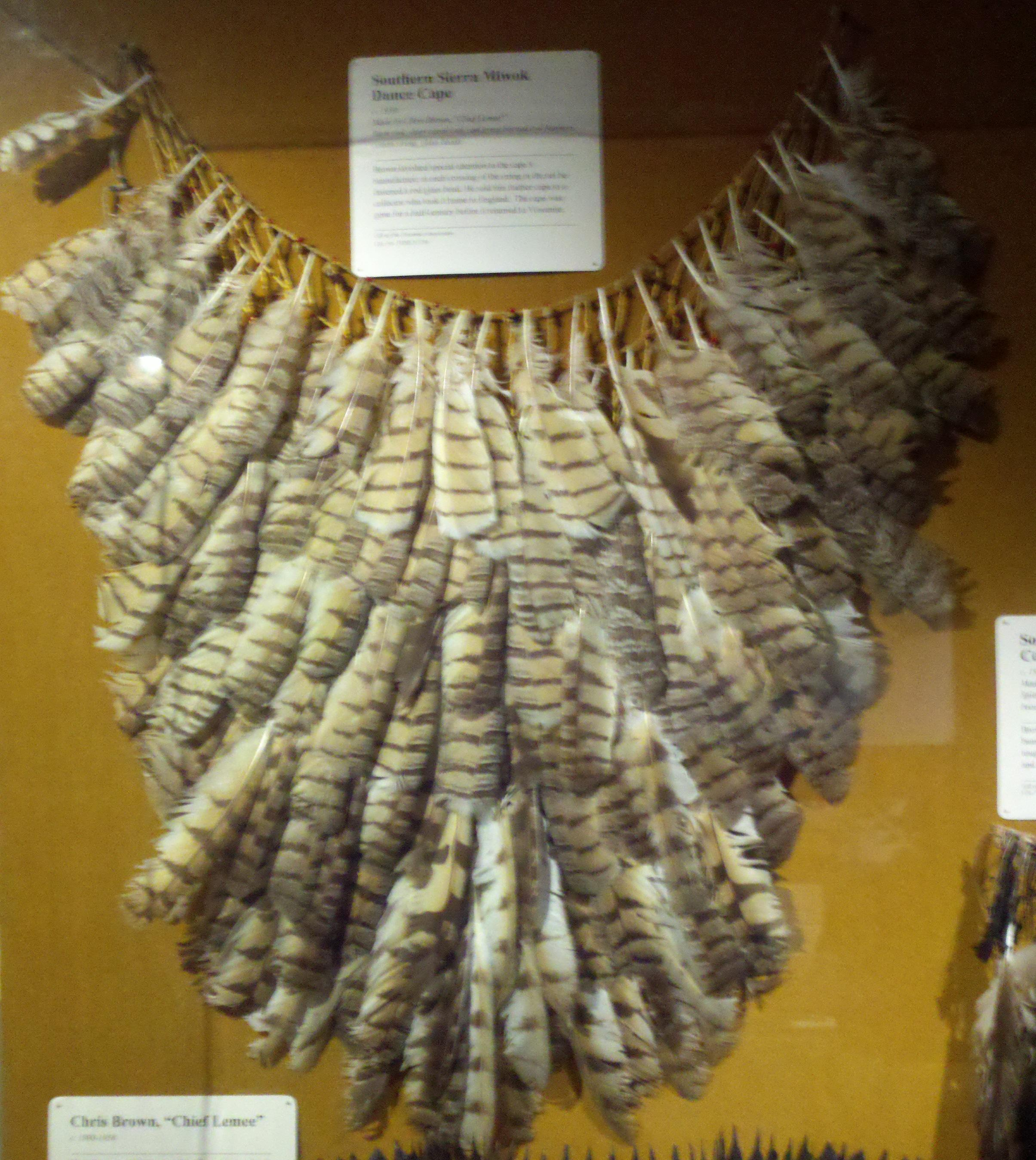
A dance cape made of owl feathers by Chris Brown ca. 1930

Christian Jorgensen Brown (1896–1956) was a Native American dancer and costume maker who performed under the name Chief Lemee. Brown was active in Yosemite Valley from the 1920s to the 1950s.

== Background ==
Brown was born in Yosemite Valley in 1896, and in his youth, his family lived near El Portal. His mother was Lena Brown, usually called a Southern Miwok, who married John Brown in 1900. He probably had some Paiute ancestry, through a band called the Kucadikadi living near Mono Lake, and may also have had Chukchansi Yokuts ancestry as well.

Brown was named after Norwegian-born artist and basket collector Christian August Jorgensen (1860–1935), who lived in Yosemite Valley for many years. Brown was "well-acquainted with Miwok ritual and religion".

Brown was known as "one of the most popular personalities in Yosemite", famous for performing "dances of his own invention, wearing elaborate beadwork and featherwork of his own design".

== Costumes ==
He incorporated a Sioux vest and moccasins into his costume, which he obtained through a relationship with the staff of the California State Indian Museum. A photo taken in 1929 also shows him wearing a war bonnet typical of the Plains Indians. His attitude at that time was to "give his audiences the tribal regalia they expected", and sometimes, he would mix "Plains and California regalia to create a suitable image."

In the 1930s, he incorporated costume elements more traditional among the Miwok and other California tribes, such as the temakela, a feathered flicker-quill headband, which he made. One of his examples incorporated elements of Pomo, Maidu and Wintun traditions.

== Dance ==
Brown learned the Eagle Dance from Pedro "Petelo" O'Connor, a Northern Miwok shaman and healer active from 1910 until his death in 1942.

== Survival skills ==
Brown would demonstrate survival skills such as arrowhead making, and the use of soaproot as a fish poison. An anthropologist described his technique: "First he mashes soaproot bulbs on a stone; he then places the bulbs into a basket and works them into a foam; the foam is poured into Yosemite Creek; and a half hour later he displays the rainbow trout that he caught." Soaproot contains a poison called saponin. In addition to the Miwok, California tribes using this technique included the Lassik, the Luiseño, the Yuki, the Yokut, the Chilula, the Wailaki, the Kato, the Mattole, the Nomlaki and the Nishinam.

He built a replica of a Miwok village next to the Yosemite Museum, which included a sweat house, traditionally used for pre-hunt purification ceremonies.
