= Christopher Browne =

Christopher Browne may refer to:

- Christopher Browne (director), American documentary filmmaker
- Chris Browne (artist) (born 1959), Australian artist
- Christopher H. Browne (1946–2009), American value investor
- Christopher Browne (MP), Member of Parliament (MP) for Stamford
- Christopher Browne (screenwriter), screenwriter
- Chris Browne (1952–2023), American cartoonist

== See also ==
- Christopher Brown (disambiguation)
