= Arthur Davis Browne =

American medical officer (1887–1974)

- Born: December 16, 1887; Salisbury, North Carolina, U.S.
- Died: May 23, 1974 (aged 83); Salisbury, North Carolina, U.S.
- Resting place: Culpeper National Cemetery, Culpeper, Virginia, U.S.
- Education: Livingstone College, Leonard Medical School (1912)
- Occupation: Physician
- Height: 5 ft 2 in (157 cm)
- Title: First Lieutenant
- Spouse: Ernestine W. Deritt (1921–1974)

Arthur Davis Browne, M.D. (December 16, 1887 – May 23, 1974) was an American medical officer in the 350th Field Artillery Regiment in the 92nd Division of the United States Army during World War I. Browne was one of the few African-American medical officers in the war. He is also credited with editing the first African-American newspaper published on the Eastern Shore.

== Early life ==
Browne was born in 1887 to Anderson and Nancy Rankin Browne in Salisbury, North Carolina. His grandmother was a washerwoman and his grandfather worked in a chewing tobacco factory.

== Education ==
Browne was schooled in the Salisbury public school system and later went to Livingstone College. After graduating from Livingstone, Browne enrolled at Leonard Medical School at Shaw University in Raleigh, North Carolina.

== Military service and career ==
Browne arrived at Fort Des Moines on August 16, 1917, after receiving a commission as a first lieutenant in the Medical Reserve Corps. While at Fort Des Moines he trained at the army's first Medical Officers Training Camp (MOTC) for African-American doctors. After completing his 80 days of training on November 3, 1917, he was sent to Camp Dix in New Jersey.

At Camp Dix, he was assigned to the 350th Field Artillery Regiment of the 92nd Division and saw action in the Metz offensive after being deployed in 1918. Although he was not sent to the front lines, he had to treat numerous wartime ailments, such as influenza, pneumonia, and combat injuries. Browne returned from France in February 1919 and was later discharged in April of that year.

== Civilian career and community activities ==
Browne eventually moved to Salisbury, Maryland in 1920 to open a general practice. In 1936, his medical office was part of a drive to deliver more typhoid vaccines with the goal of eradicating the disease nationally.

By the 1950s, he had a medical office in his home at 600 Isabella Street. Browne is credited with editing the first African-American newspaper published on the Eastern Shore. He also organized the Wicomico County Federation of Colored Health and Welfare Club.

== Personal life ==
Browne moved to Salisbury, Maryland in 1920 and married Ernestine W. Deritt in 1921. He was a member of the Methodist Episcopal Church a member of various other organizations including The Elks, Knights of Pythias and the Freemasons.

== Death ==
Browne died in May 1974. He was buried with his wife at Culpeper National Cemetery in Culpeper, Virginia.
