= J. Stanley Brown =

American educator

James Stanley Brown (September 1863 in Cumberland, Ohio – September 6, 1939) was a leader in high school and post-secondary education in the United States. His work with William Rainey Harper led to the creation of the first community college in the country.

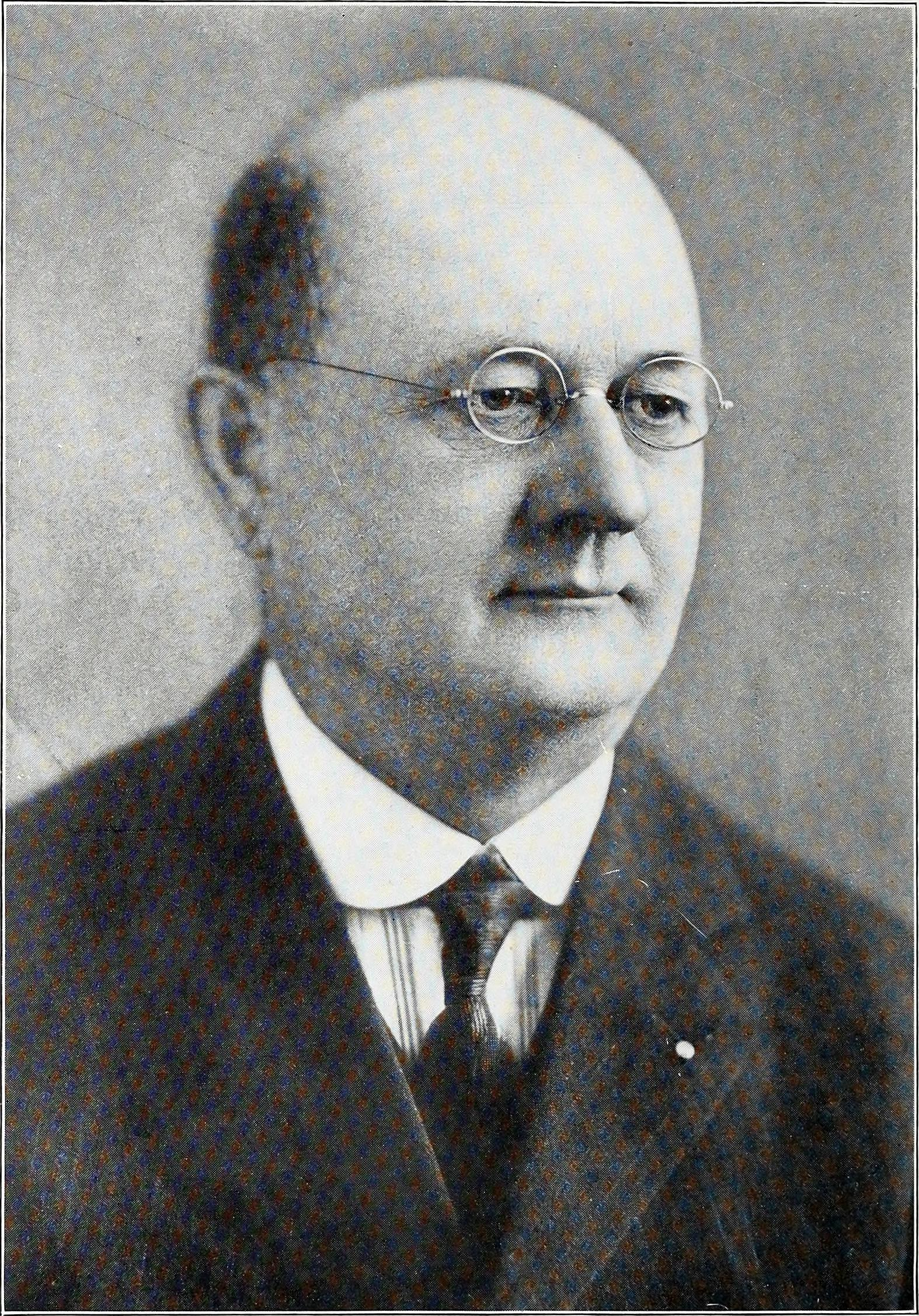
J. Stanley Brown

== Joliet school district and first community college ==
Brown became principal of Joliet High School in 1893, later becoming the Joliet Township High School superintendent. During his career in Joliet, the school started offering college-level courses which students could use towards college credit, similar to the current Dual Credit programs.

William Rainey Harper, president of University of Chicago, held conferences in Chicago known as "Conferences of the Affiliated and Cooperating Schools" to organize cooperation between regional high schools and the college. Brown's work with this conference led to Joliet High School being approved in 1899 as a secondary school that could offer college credit to their students. The high school was then able to offer a six-year program that included the first two years of college starting in 1901.

Allowing students to earn the first two years of a college degree in the high school district was the beginning of community colleges. Brown explained that this model benefited students because a college degree had value, and some students were unable to move away to attend a four-year college. The change to a community college began slowly. The early program was teaching high school students post-graduate classes. Eventually, J. Stanley Brown obtained accreditation for Joliet Junior College in 1917.

== Northern Illinois State Normal School ==
Two years after obtaining accreditation for JJC, Brown left Joliet to join Northern Illinois State Normal School (now Northern Illinois University) in DeKalb, Illinois. J. Stanley Brown became the second president of NISNS in 1919. Here Brown continued his expansion of school offerings. He pushed for the two-year normal school to become a four-year bachelor's offering school. He also worked to integrate the school and the surrounding community, what NIU now describes as the "Communiversity Philosophy".

== Retirement and return to Joliet ==
Brown retired in 1927. He returned to Joliet where he spent time with family who still lived in the area. He died at his summer home in Frankfort.
