= Martin Browne =

Martin Browne may refer to:

- E. Martin Browne (1900–1980), English theatre director
- Martin Browne (politician) (born 1965/66), Irish Sinn Féin politician for Tipperary

== See also ==
- Martin Brown (disambiguation)
