= Mary Brown (nurse) =

Soldier and nurse in the American Civil War

Mary Ann Berry Brown
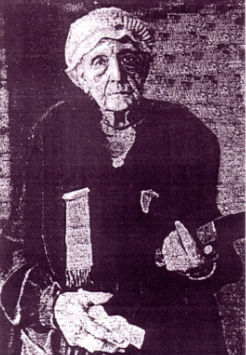
- Born: June 30, 1840; Lewiston, Maine, US
- Died: March 15, 1936 (aged 95); Brownfield, Maine, US
- Known for: Civil War nurse and soldier

Mary Ann Brown (June 30, 1840 – March 15, 1936) was a nurse and soldier in the American Civil War who served alongside her husband in the 31st Maine Infantry Regiment.

== Biography ==
Mary Ann Berry was born on June 30, 1840, in Lewiston, Maine. She met her husband, Ivory Brown in 1861, and they married on August 12, 1861. Ivory served for three months in the 1st Maine Volunteer Infantry Regiment, and then enlisted in the 31st Maine Infantry in 1864. Mary likely enlisted as a nurse and disguised herself as a soldier in order to remain close to her husband. She later claimed to have "carried a musket...and fought like the rest of them". She stated she joined because "slavery was an awful thing and we were determined to fight it down". After the war, Mary and Ivory returned to Maine and worked a small farm in Brownfield for nearly forty years. They had one daughter named Lydia. In the late 1890s, Ivory's health began to decline, and began to claim his war pension. He died on October 12, 1903, of kidney disease. Mary outlived him by thirty years, but eventually grew senile and was placed in the local Farrington Hospital, where she died on March 15, 1936, at the age of 95.

She was featured in a Civil War exhibit from 2012–2013, and in 2016, a fundraiser was begun to place a headstone to commemorate her in the Brownfield Pine Grove Cemetery, next to her husband. It was installed on September 13, 2017.
