= M. Christopher Brown II =

American university executive

President, Kentucky State University
- In office May 15, 2017 – July 20, 2021
- Preceded by: Raymond Burse (2013)

President, Alcorn State University
- In office July 1, 2011 – Dec. 13, 2013
- Preceded by: George E. Ross
- Succeeded by: Alfred Rankins

Executive VP & Provost, Southern University
- In office October 2015 – May 2017

Executive VP & Provost, Fisk University
- In office July 2009 – December 2010

Dean, College of Education University of Nevada, Las Vegas
- In office July 2007 – June 2009

Personal details
- Education: South Carolina State University (BA); University of Kentucky (MS); The Pennsylvania State University (Ph.D.)

M. Christopher Brown II is an American academic administrator and university president. He is the former president of Kentucky State University in Frankfort, Kentucky.

== Career ==
Brown previously served as president of the nation's first historically black land-grant institution, Alcorn State University, and was the inaugural Executive Vice President and Provost of the Southern University System and Southern University campus. He held the same position at Fisk University, where he was also a professor.

Prior to this appointment, he served as dean of the College of Education at the University of Nevada, Las Vegas, vice president for Programs and Administration at the American Association of Colleges for Teacher Education, director of Social Justice and Professional Development for the American Educational Research Association, as well as executive director and chief research scientist of the Frederick D. Patterson Research Institute of the United Negro College Fund. Brown has held faculty appointments at Pennsylvania State University, the University of Illinois at Urbana-Champaign, and the University of Missouri-Kansas City.

Brown was named president of Alcorn State University in November 2010. In three years with the university, Brown was regarded for efforts to increase enrollment at the historically black college, which grew to more than 4,000 for the first time in the school's history in 2011. In October 2012, months after Alcorn was named 'HBCU of the Year' by the Center for HBCU Media Advocacy, Brown accepted a unanimous four-year extension of his contract from the Mississippi Institutions of Higher Learning Board of Trustees.

In September 2012, Brown hired Jay Hopson as the first white head football coach in the history of Alcorn State, and the Southwestern Athletic Conference. In 2014, Hopson and the Braves won the school's first SWAC conference football championship in 20 years.

In 2013, under Brown's leadership, Alcorn State University unveiled a statue of civil rights activist and ASU alumnus Medgar Evers, the largest of its kind in the world. That same year, Brown was named HBCU Male President of the Year by the Center for HBCU Media Advocacy.

Brown resigned from Alcorn State University in 2013 following allegations of improper procurement practices for campus event contracts and facility renovations by the Mississippi Institutions of Higher Learning. State higher education and law enforcement officials never published direct connections of wrongdoing to Brown's authorization of contracts, and did not file charges against or require reimbursement from any current or former employees.

== Honors and awards ==
- African American Image Award, Phi Beta Sigma fraternity (2013)
- Male HBCU President of the Year, Center for HBCU Media Advocacy (2013)
- Man of the Year Leadership Award, Krewe of the Natchez Indians (2013)
- Earl Willard Banks, Sr. Award, Robinson-Watson Book Company (2012)
- PSU Excellence in Education Award, The Highest Distinction bestowed by The PSU College of Education Alumni Society (2011)
- PSU Alumni Achievement Award (2005)

== Selected publications ==
- Brown, M. C., Brown, G., & Lester, D. (in progress, 2021). A charge to keep: Historically black college and university missions, presidents, and the ministry of education. Charlotte: Information Age.
- Brown, M. C., Graham, T. M., Hefner, D. N., & Tillman, W. T. (in progress, 2020). Strategic leadership for historically black colleges and universities: Public contexts, presidential competencies, and prioritizing competition. New York: Peter Lang.
- Brown, M. C., & Dancy, T. E. (2018). Black colleges across the diaspora: Global perspectives on race and stratification in postsecondary education. United Kingdom: Emerald Publishing.
- Knaus, C. B., & Brown, M. C. (2016). Whiteness is the new South Africa: Qualitative research on post-apartheid racism in schools and society. New York: Peter Lang.
- Brown, M. C., Dancy, T. E., & Davis, J. E. (2013). Educating African American males: Contexts for consideration, possibilities for practice. New York: Peter Lang.
- Dancy, T. E., & Brown, M. C. (2012). African American males and education: Researching the convergence of race and identity. Charlotte, NC: Information Age.
- Brown, M. C., Lane, J. E., & Zamani-Gallaher, E. M. (2010). Organization and governance in higher education: An ASHE reader (6th edition). Needham Heights, MA: Pearson Custom.
- Zamani-Gallaher, E. M., Green, D. O., Brown, M. C., & Stovall, D. O. (2009). The case for affirmative action on campus: Concepts of equity, considerations for practice. Sterling, VA: Stylus.
- Brown, M. C., & Bartee, R. D. (2009). The broken cisterns of African American education: Academic performance and achievement in the post-Brown era. Charlotte, NC: Information Age.
- Ricard, R. B., & Brown, M. C. (2008). Ebony towers in higher education: The evolution, mission, and presidency of historically black colleges and universities. Sterling, VA: Stylus.
- Bartee, R. D., & Brown, M. C. (2007). School matters: Why African American students need multiple forms of capital. New York: Peter Lang.
- Brown, M. C., w/ Bartee, R. D. (2007). Still not equal: Expanding educational opportunity in society. New York: Peter Lang.
- Robinson, S. P., & Brown, M. C. (2007). The children hurricane Katrina left behind: Schooling context, professional preparation, and community politics. New York: Peter Lang.
- Brown, M. C., & Land, R. R. (2005). The politics of curricular change: Race, hegemony and power in education. New York: Peter Lang.
- Brown, M. C., & Freeman, K. (2004). Black colleges: New perspectives on policy and practice. Westport, CT: Praeger.
- Brown, M. C. (2000). Organization and governance in higher education: An ASHE reader (5th edition). Needham Heights, MA: Pearson Custom.
- Brown, M. C., & Davis, J. E. (2000). Black sons to mothers: Compliments, critiques, and challenges for cultural workers in education. New York: Peter Lang.
- Brown, M. C. (1999). The quest to define collegiate desegregation: Black colleges, Title VI compliance, and post- Adams litigation. Westport, CT: Bergin & Garvey.
