= Shawn Brown =

Shawn Brown, Sean Brown, Shaun Brown, or Sean Browne may refer to:

- Shawn Brown (soccer) (born 1987), Jamaican-Canadian soccer player
- Seán Browne (1916–1996), Irish politician
- Sean K. L. Browne (born 1953), American sculptor
- Shawn Brown, a vocalist in the bands Dag Nasty and Swiz
- Shaun Brown (business), former managing director of the Special Broadcasting Service
- Shaun Brown (actor) (born 1987), American actor
- Sean Brown (ice hockey) (born 1976), Canadian former ice hockey player
