= Mary Ann Brown Patten =

First female commander of a US merchant vessel

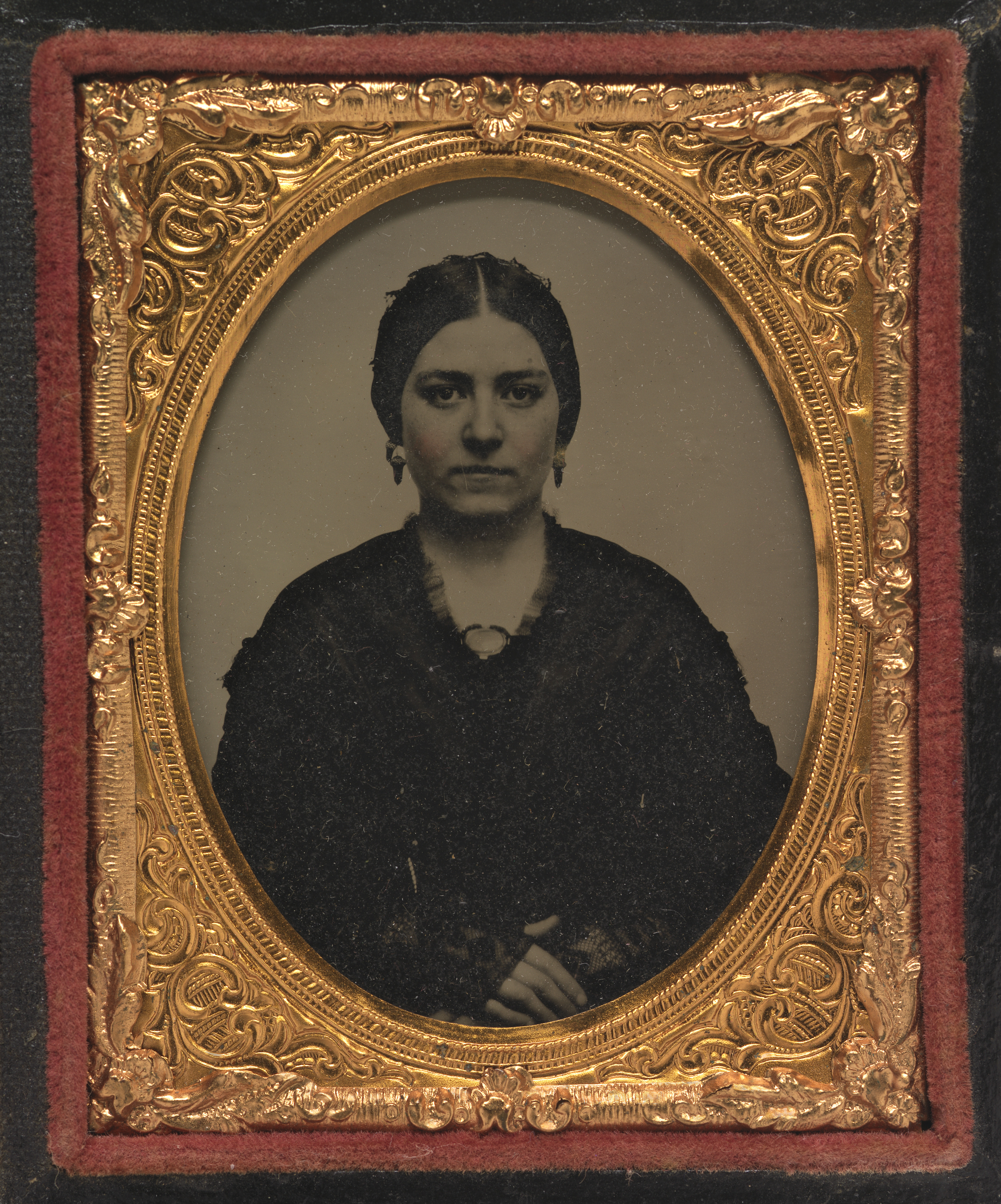
- Patten, c. 1857
- Born: April 6, 1837; Chelsea, Massachusetts, U.S.
- Died: March 17, 1861 (aged 23); Boston, Massachusetts, U.S.
- Spouse: Joshua Adams Patten (m. 1853; died 1857)
- Children: Joshua Patten

Mary Ann Brown Patten or Patton (April 6, 1837 – March 17, 1861) was the first female commander of an American merchant vessel. She was the wife of Joshua Adams Patten, captain of the merchant clipper ship Neptune's Car. The ship was bound around Cape Horn from New York towards San Francisco when Joshua Patten collapsed from fatigue in 1856. His wife took command for 56 days, faced down a mutiny, and successfully managed to navigate the clipper ship into San Francisco. At the time of docking, she was 19 years old and eight months pregnant with her only child.

== Early life and first voyage ==
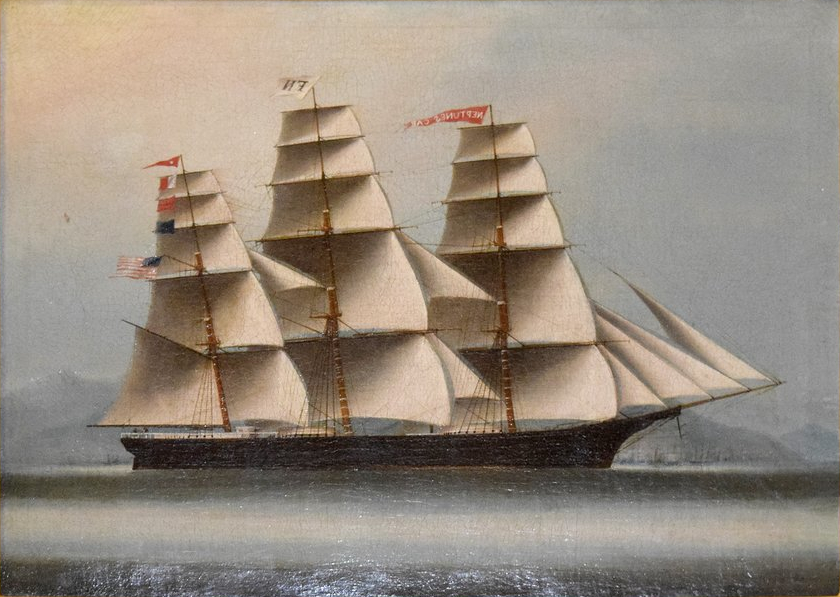
Neptune's Car in Hong Kong harbor

Mary Ann Brown was born in Chelsea, Massachusetts, in 1837 to George and Elizabeth Brown. She married a young captain named Joshua Adams Patten (1827–1857) in Boston on April 1, 1853, aged 15. In 1855 Captain Patten was offered the command of a clipper ship named Neptune's Car. Patten was hesitant to leave his wife for so long so early in their marriage, and so the ship's owners granted permission for her to accompany him.

Neptune's Car was launched in 1853 and by 1855 the vessel had already developed a reputation for speed. It was 216 feet long and weighed 1,617 tons. According to the New York Herald, Patten was a last minute replacement for the ship's previous captain, who had taken ill shortly before the vessel was set to travel the world. The Herald claims that Joshua and Mary Patten were aboard Neptune's Car preparing to leave the dock only 12 hours after they first received the offer. For the next 17 months, they sailed to San Francisco, China, London, and back to New York. Mary passed the time learning navigation and assisting Joshua with his duties as captain.

== Husband's collapse and attempted mutiny ==
On Mary's second voyage with her husband, the ship departed from New York for San Francisco on July 1, 1856, along with two other clipper ships, the Intrepid and Romance of the Seas. This made speed a greater priority than usual, as it was common practice to place bets on which vessel would arrive first. Neptune's Car was at the foot of Cape Horn when Joshua Patten, who had tuberculosis, lapsed into a coma. Under usual circumstances the first mate would take command. However, earlier in the voyage Captain Patten had caught him sleeping on watch and losing valuable time by leaving sails reefed. The mate had likely placed bets on one of Neptune's Car's competitors, and so Captain Patten had confined him to his cabin. The second mate was illiterate and unable to navigate, which left Mary Patten the most qualified person on board to bring the ship safely into port.

The former first mate wrote Patten a letter warning her of the challenges ahead and imploring her to reinstate him, but she replied that if her husband had not trusted him as a mate she could not trust him as a captain. He then attempted to incite a mutiny by trying to convince the crew that they would be better off putting into the nearby port of Valparaiso rather than continuing on to San Francisco. Patten knew that putting into port in South America would mean a loss of crew and quite possibly cargo. She responded by making an appeal to the crew, and in the end won their unanimous support. Patten later claimed that she did not change her clothes for 50 days, instead dedicating her free time to studying medicine and caring for her husband, who had been struck blind by the time they passed Valparaiso. She is credited with keeping him alive during the voyage although he never fully recovered his health.

== Arrival in San Francisco and return northeast ==
When Neptune's Car arrived at San Francisco Harbor Mary Patten rejected an offer to wait for a pilot to navigate the clipper ship into port, and instead took the helm herself. Despite all of Neptune's Car's tribulations, the clipper ship still arrived in San Francisco second, beating the Intrepid. The ship's insurers, recognizing that Mary Patten had saved them thousands of dollars, rewarded her with one thousand dollars in February 1857. In a letter responding to the gift, she said that she performed "only the plain duty of a wife."

Joshua Patten survived the journey back to New York on the steamer George Law and safely returned to Boston with his wife. There on March 10, less than a month after arriving in port, Mary gave birth to a son whom she named Joshua. Captain Patten died in July 1857. Mary Ann Brown Patten was given $1,399 from a fund for her relief set up by the Boston Courier.

Mary Patten died of tuberculosis four years later on March 17, 1861, aged 23. She and her husband are both buried at the Woodlawn Cemetery in Everett, Massachusetts.

== Legacy ==
Mary Patten's voyage was the inspiration for a novel by Douglas Kelley titled The Captain's Wife, and the subject of a narrative non-fiction book called The Sea Captain's Wife by Tilar J. Mazzeo.

Patten's voyage is also the subject of the 2026 play Steady She Goes by Erica Berman from the Forward Theater Company of Madison, Wisconsin.

The hospital at the U.S. Merchant Marine Academy in King's Point, New York, is named after her.
