= Christophe Brown =

American-Swiss ice hockey player

- Born: July 26, 1974 (age 50); Albuquerque, New Mexico, USA
- Height: 5 ft 10 in (178 cm)
- Weight: 185 lb (84 kg; 13 st 3 lb)
- Position: Right wing
- Shot: Left
- Played for: HC Fribourg-Gottéron (NLA); EV Zug (NLA); Lausanne HC (NLA)
- Playing career: 1992–2008

Christophe Brown (born July 26, 1974 in Albuquerque, New Mexico), also known as Christopher Brown, is a former American-Swiss professional ice hockey player who played in the European Elite Switzerland National League A (NLA) for HC Fribourg-Gottéron, EV Zug, and Lausanne HC.

== Career statistics ==
| | | | Regular season | | | | | Playoffs |
| Season | Team | League | GP | G | A | Pts | PIM | GP | G | A | Pts | PIM |
|---|---|---|---|---|---|---|---|---|---|---|---|---|
| 1992–93 | HC Fribourg-Gottéron | NLA | 2 | 0 | 0 | 0 | 0 | – | – | – | – | – |
| 1993–94 | HC Fribourg-Gottéron | NLA | 25 | 3 | 2 | 5 | 2 | 11 | 1 | 0 | 1 | 0 |
| 1994–95 | HC Fribourg-Gottéron | NLA | 36 | 11 | 1 | 12 | 6 | 8 | 1 | 2 | 3 | 6 |
| 1995–96 | HC Fribourg-Gottéron | NLA | 32 | 5 | 7 | 12 | 18 |
| 1996–97 | HC Fribourg-Gottéron | NLA | 46 | 11 | 7 | 18 | 51 |
| 1997–98 | HC Fribourg-Gottéron | NLA | 40 | 12 | 9 | 21 | 36 |
| 1998–99 | EV Zug | NLA | 43 | 7 | 11 | 18 | 14 |
| 1999–00 | EV Zug | NLA | 45 | 4 | 13 | 17 | 28 | 11 | 2 | 1 | 3 | 4 |
| 2000–01 | EV Zug | NLA | 44 | 8 | 13 | 21 | 16 | 4 | 0 | 0 | 0 | 0 |
| 2001–02 | EV Zug | NLA | 42 | 1 | 5 | 6 | 22 |
| 2002–03 | Lausanne HC | NLA | 16 | 2 | 3 | 5 | 6 |
| 2003–04 | Lausanne HC | NLA | 30 | 2 | 4 | 6 | 22 |
| 2004–05 | Lausanne HC | NLA | 42 | 7 | 4 | 11 | 30 | – | – | – | – | – |
| 2005–06 | EHC Visp | NLB | 40 | 10 | 21 | 31 | 60 |
| 2006–07 | EHC Visp | NLB | 44 | 12 | 13 | 25 | 42 |
| 2007–08 | HC Sierre-Anniviers | NLB | 41 | 11 | 15 | 26 | 70 |
