= Daniel Browne (disambiguation) =

Daniel Browne (born 1979) is a New Zealand rugby player.

Dan or Daniel Browne may refer to:

- Dan Browne (born 1975), American distance runner
- Daniel Browne (Irish politician) (1936–2023)
