= Isaac Hawkins Browne =

Isaac Hawkins Browne may refer to

- Isaac Hawkins Browne (poet) (1705–1760), English politician and poet
- Isaac Hawkins Browne (coal owner) (1745–1818), English politician and industrialist, son of the above
