= Stan Browne =

Australian rugby league footballer

Personal information
- Born: 17 May 1962 (age 63) Sydney, New South Wales, Australia

Playing information
- Position: Wing, Centre
Club
Years	Team	Pld	T	G	FG	P
1982–83	South Sydney	30	8	0	0	28
1984–86	Illawarra Steelers	44	6	0	0	24
	Total	74	14	0	0	52

Stan Browne (born 17 May 1962) is an Australian teacher, education administrator and former first grade rugby league player.

As a student, Browne attended Marist College Pagewood where he was chosen in their Rugby League Team of the Half Century.

Browne appeared in 74 top grade matches between 1982 and 1986. He went on to become marketing director for the South Sydney Rabbitohs.

Away from football Browne was a teacher of Personal Development, Health and Physical Education (PDHPE). He is the author of the text book series PDHPE application and inquiry ISBN 9780195566109. In 1992 Browne was the education project co-ordinator for an AIDS education program.

In 2014, Browne was presented with an award for Outstanding Contribution to the PDHPE Profession.

In 2016, Browne broke his leg in 20 places after falling from a ladder while trimming a tree.

He is currently a senior inspector at the New South Wales Education Standards Authority.
