= Jim Gush =

American football coach (born 1958)

Biographical details
- Born: October 29, 1958 (age 68); Elmira, New York, U.S.
- Education: Bucknell University (1981); Iowa State University (1986)

Playing career
- 1977–1980: Bucknell
- Position: Safety

Coaching career (HC unless noted)
- 1981–1982: Southside HS (NY) (JV)
- 1983: Albany (DB)
- 1984–1986: Iowa State (GA)
- 1987–1995: Garden City (DC)
- 1996–1998: Garden City
- 1999–2001: Kansas State (LB)
- 2002: SMU (DC/LB)
- 2003–2007: SMU (DC/DB)
- 2009–2010: Stony Brook (AHC/DC)
- 2011–2016: Baylor (LB)
- 2017: Navarro (DC)
- 2018: Navarro
- 2019: McNeese State (DC)
- 2021: North Texas (LB)
- 2022: North Texas (co-DC/LB)
- 2023–2024: Incarnate Word (DC)
- 2025: Incarnate Word (assoc. HC/DC)

Head coaching record
- Overall: 35–10
- Bowls: 1–2
- Tournaments: 0–1 (NJCAA playoffs); 7–2 (KJCCC playoffs); 0–1 (SWJCFC playoffs)

Accomplishments and honors

Championships
- 1 KJCCC (1997)

James Gush (born October 29, 1958) is an American college football coach. He was the associate head football coach and defensive coordinator for the University of the Incarnate Word from 2023–2025. He was the head football coach for Garden City Community College from 1996 to 1998 and Navarro College in 2018. He also coached for Southside High School, Albany, Iowa State, Kansas State, SMU, Stony Brook, Baylor, McNeese, and North Texas. He played college football for Bucknell as a safety.

== Head coaching record ==
Year	Team	Overall	Conference	Standing	Bowl/playoffs	NJCAA^{#}
Garden City Broncbusters (Kansas Jayhawk Community College Conference) (1996–1998)
1996	Garden City	10–2	6–1	T–1st	L KJCCC championship, L Real Dairy Bowl	7
1997	Garden City	10–2	6–1	T–1st	W KJCCC championship, L Red River Bowl	4
1998	Garden City	9–3	5–2	T–2nd	L KJCCC championship, W Valley of the Sun Bowl	7
Garden City:		29–5	17–4			
Navarro Bulldogs (Southwest Junior College Football Conference) (2018)
2018	Navarro	6–5	4–3	T–3rd	L SWJCFC semifinal, L Salt City Bowl	
Navarro:		6–5	4–3			
Total:		35–10				
National championship Conference title Conference division title or championship game berth
