= Dale Carr (American football) =

American football player and coach (born 1964)

Biographical details
- Born: March 10, 1964 (age 62)

Playing career
- 1984–1988: Colorado State
- Position: Linebacker

Coaching career (HC unless noted)
- c. 1989: Stephen F. Austin (assistant)
- 1991–1995: Tyler (assistant)
- 1996–2004: Tyler
- 2005–2009: Angelo State

Head coaching record
- Overall: 28–36 (college); 66–32 (junior college)
- Bowls: 2–3 (junior college)
- Tournaments: 0–1 (NCAA D-II playoffs); 5–6 (SWJCFC playoffs)

Accomplishments and honors

Championships
- 1 SWJCFC (2000)

Dale Carr (born March 10, 1964) is an American former college football coach. He served as the head football at Tyler Junior College in Tyler, Texas from 1996 to 2004 and Angelo State University in San Angelo, Texas from 2005 to 2009.

Carr played football at Permian High School. His junior year the team went on to win the Texas 5A state championship in 1980. He played college football at Colorado State University, where he earned first team All-Western Athletic Conference his senior year and was once named Sports Illustrated Defensive Player of the Week.

Carrs' first college coaching job was as an assistant coach at Stephen F. Austin State University, where he helped lead the Lumberjacks to the 1989 NCAA Division I-AA Football Championship title game. At Tyler he amassed a 66–32 overall record and led them to five bowl games.

In 2005, he was hired as the head coach at Angelo State. In his first year, he brought the once prominent, but recent struggling program, to the NCAA Division II playoffs. After three losing seasons in 2009 his team ranked as high as 21st in the nation, yet narrowly missed the playoffs, going 6–5. In 2010 after another disappointing season of 5–5 and 1–6 in the Lone Star Conference South, Angelo State's athletic director announced that Carr's contract and those of his assistants would not be renewed & the university would begin a nationwide search immediately for a new head football coach.

== Personal life ==
Carr is married to Vanessa Carr. They have two children, Alyssa and Benjamin .

== Head coaching record ==
=== College ===
Year	Team	Overall	Conference	Standing	Bowl/playoffs	AFCA^{#}
Angelo State Rams (Lone Star Conference) (2005–2010)
2005	Angelo State	9–3	7–2 / 4–2	T–2nd / 2nd (South)	L NCAA Division II First Round	23
2006	Angelo State	3–7	2–7 / 2–4	T–10th / 5th (South)		
2007	Angelo State	2–8	2–7 / 1–5	12th / 6th (South)		
2008	Angelo State	3–8	3–6 / 1–5	9th / 6th (South)		
2009	Angelo State	6–5	5–4 / 2–4	T–6th / 6th (South)		
2010	Angelo State	5–5	5–5 / 1–5	T–6th / 6th (South)		
Angelo State:		28–36	24–31			
Total:		28–36				

=== Junior college ===
Year	Team	Overall	Conference	Standing	Bowl/playoffs
Tyler Apaches (Southwest Junior College Football Conference) (1996–2004)
1996	Tyler	8–2	5–1	2nd	L SWJCFC semifinal
1997	Tyler	6–5	4–3	2nd	L SWJCFC semifinal, L Real Dairy Bowl
1998	Tyler	7–3	6–1	T–1st	L SWJCFC semifinal
1999	Tyler	5–5	3–4	T–5th	
2000	Tyler	9–3	5–2	T–2nd	W SWJCFC championship–Red River Bowl
2001	Tyler	8–4	5–2	T–2nd	L SWJCFC championship–Red River Bowl
2002	Tyler	5–4	2–4	T–5th	
2003	Tyler	10–2	5–1	T–1st	L SWJCFC championship, W C.H.A.M.P.S. Heart of Texas Bowl
2004	Tyler	8–4	4–2	3rd	L SWJCFC championship, L C.H.A.M.P.S. Heart of Texas Bowl
Tyler:		66–32	39–20		
Total:		66–32			
National championship Conference title Conference division title or championship game berth
