= Harry Fritz =

Harry Fritz may refer to:

- Harry Fritz (baseball) (1890–1974), third baseman in Major League Baseball
- Harry Fritz (coach) (1920–1987), collegiate athletics administrator and an American football, basketball, and baseball coach
- Harry Fritz (tennis) (born 1951), Canadian-American tennis player
