= Willie Fritz =

American football player and coach (born 1960)

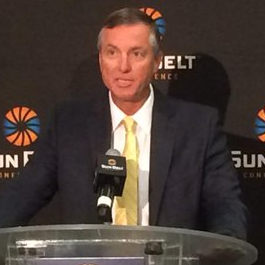
- Fritz at the 2015 Sun Belt Media Day

Current position
- Title: Head coach
- Team: Houston
- Conference: Big 12
- Record: 22–14

Biographical details
- Born: April 2, 1960 (age 66); Shawnee Mission, Kansas, U.S.

Playing career
- 1978–1981: Pittsburg State
- Position: Defensive back

Coaching career (HC unless noted)
- 1982: Pittsburg State (GA)
- 1983: Shawnee Mission NW HS (KS) (asst.)
- 1984–1985: Sam Houston State (GA)
- 1986: Willis HS (TX) (assistant)
- 1987–1990: Coffeyville (DC)
- 1991–1992: Sam Houston State (DB/ST)
- 1993–1996: Blinn
- 1997–2009: Central Missouri
- 2010–2013: Sam Houston State
- 2014–2015: Georgia Southern
- 2016–2023: Tulane
- 2024–present: Houston

Head coaching record
- Overall: 230–130 (college); 39–5–1 (junior college)
- Bowls: 5–1 (college); 2–1 (junior college)
- Tournaments: 7–3 (NCAA D-I playoffs); 0–1 (NCAA D-II playoffs); 4–0 (TJCFC/SWJCFC playoffs)

Accomplishments and honors

Championships
- 2 NJCAA National (1995, 1996); 2 TJCFC/SWJCFC (1995, 1996); 1 MIAA (2003); 2 Southland (2011, 2012); 1 Sun Belt (2014); 1 AAC (2022); 1 AAC West Division (2018)

Awards
- Bobby Dodd Coach of the Year (2022); George Munger Award (2022) AFCA FCS Coach of the Year (2011); Liberty Mutual Coach of the Year Award (2012); Sun Belt Coach of the Year (2014); 2× AAC Coach of the Year (2022, 2023)

Willie Fritz (born April 2, 1960) is an American college football coach and former player. He is the head football coach at the University of Houston. Fritz served as the head football coach at University of Central Missouri from 1997 to 2009, Sam Houston State University from 2010 to 2013, Georgia Southern University from 2014 to 2015, and Tulane University from 2016 to 2023. From 1993 to 1996, he was the head football coach at Blinn College, a junior college in Brenham, Texas, where he led his teams to consecutive NJCAA National Football Championships, in 1995 and 1996.

== Playing career ==
Born in Shawnee Mission, Kansas, Fritz played college football at Pittsburg State University, where he was a defensive back for the Gorillas. He also played for the basketball team as a point guard.

== Coaching career ==
From 1993 to 1996, Fritz was head coach at Blinn College. He turned around a program that had gone 5–24–1 in its three previous seasons, producing a 39–5–1 record. In 1995 and 1996, Fritz led the Buccaneers to two national junior college championships. For his efforts at Blinn, Fritz was inducted into the NJCAA Hall of Fame.

Fritz coached at the University of Central Missouri from 1997 until 2009 and led the Mules to their first post-season berth in 32 years when they defeated Minnesota-Duluth in the 2001 Mineral Water Bowl. In 2002, Central Missouri earned its first NCAA Division II playoff berth after winning the Mid-America Athletic Association (MIAA) championship. Fritz became the university's winningest coach with a 97–47 record.

Fritz was the second member of his family to coach at Central Missouri. His father, the late Harry Fritz, was the Mules' head football coach in 1952 and later became executive director of the National Association of Intercollegiate Athletics (NAIA).

Fritz became the 14th head football coach at Sam Houston State University on December 18, 2010. During the 2011 season, his second year at Sam Houston State, Fritz coached the Bearkats to the FCS's only undefeated regular season and into the FCS playoffs. He coached the Bearkats to back-to-back national title game appearances in 2011 and 2012 in only three years of being head coach at Sam Houston State.

Before his coaching career, Fritz served as a graduate assistant for the Bearkat squads that went 16–6 in 1984–85 and won the 1985 Gulf Star Conference championship. He went on to become the secondary and special teams coach for the Bearkats in 1991 and 1992, helping lead Sam Houston to a Southland Conference championship.

On January 10, 2014, Fritz became the head football coach at Georgia Southern University. In the Eagles' first FBS season, the team finished the season 9–3 overall and was undefeated in Sun Belt Conference play at 8–0, winning the outright conference championship. They were also the first team ever to go unbeaten in conference play in their first FBS season. In the 2015 season, Fritz led the Eagles to an 8–4 record, receiving their first bowl bid to the GoDaddy Bowl on December 23, 2015, where they defeated Bowling Green.

On December 11, 2015, ESPN reported that Fritz would become the 39th head football coach at Tulane University. In his third season, Tulane posted its first winning season (7–6) under Fritz. His first two seasons saw Tulane win nine combined games, which was an improvement from the three victories in both of the two seasons prior to his arrival. The 2018 team went 6–6 in the regular season, winning five of the eight conference games to finish in a three-way tie for the AAC Western Division title, although they did not play in the AAC title game. They were invited to play in the 2018 Cure Bowl, the first bowl game for Tulane since 2013. They faced Louisiana and beat them, 41–24, for the program's first bowl win since 2002. The next two seasons saw them finish with .500 records that saw them invited to bowl games, which meant Tulane went to a bowl game in three straight seasons for the first time ever, which resulted in a bowl win and loss.

The 2022 season saw tremendous turnaround. The 2021 team won just two games, but the following season saw them match that total before the season was halfway over. The Wave lost just twice in regular season play, with one being against the UCF Knights at home. However, a victory over Cincinnati clinched a berth in the 2022 American Athletic Conference Football Championship Game, which they hosted. In the game, Tulane never trailed, keeping pace with UCF (who got as close as three points late) in an eventual 45–28 victory. It was the fifth conference title for Fritz as a coach (having done so for four separate teams) as well as the first conference title for Tulane since 1998. Ranked 14th in the AP Poll, they were selected as an at-large team to play the USC Trojans (ranked 8th in the polls) in the 2023 Cotton Bowl Classic, their first major bowl game since the 1940 Sugar Bowl. Tulane trailed for most of the game, which included being down by fifteen points with under five minutes to go in the game. But Tulane rallied with a quick touchdown and a stroke of luck in a subsequent safety to give them the ball with three minutes to play. Tulane drove 66 yards and converted multiple fourth downs before scoring the go-ahead touchdown with nine seconds remaining. Tulane won by a final score of 46–45 for their first major bowl victory since 1935. The win was the 12th in the season, matching the 1998 team for most ever and setting a record for the best single-season improvement in NCAA football history. He is the second-winningest coach in Green Wave history, behind only Hall of Famer Clark Shaughnessy. He is also one of only two coaches since 1951 to leave Tulane with a winning record.

On December 3, 2023, Fritz was hired as the 16th head coach at the University of Houston.

== Personal life ==
Fritz and his wife, Susan, have three children, Wesley, Lainie, and Brooke.

== Head coaching record ==
=== Junior college ===
Year	Team	Overall	Conference	Standing	Bowl/playoffs
Blinn Buccaneers (Texas/Southwest Junior College Football Conference) (1993–1996)
1993	Blinn	6–3–1	3–2–1	4th	
1994	Blinn	9–2	5–1	2nd	L Mineral Water Bowl
1995	Blinn	12–0	6–0	1st	W TJCFC championship, W Texas Shrine Bowl
1996	Blinn	12–0	6–0	1st	W SWJCFC championship, W Mineral Water Bowl
Blinn:		39–5–1	20–3–1		
Total:		39–5–1			
National championship Conference title Conference division title or championship game berth

=== College ===
Year	Team	Overall	Conference	Standing	Bowl/playoffs	Coaches^{#}	AP/TSN^{°}
Central Missouri Mules (Mid-America Intercollegiate Athletics Association) (1997–2009)
1997	Central Missouri	5–6	4–5	6th			
1998	Central Missouri	8–3	6–3	T–3rd			
1999	Central Missouri	7–4	5–4	4th			
2000	Central Missouri	7–4	5–4	T–4th			
2001	Central Missouri	10–2	7–2	2nd	W Mineral Water	20	
2002	Central Missouri	10–2	8–1	2nd	L NCAA Division II First Round	8	
2003	Central Missouri	9–2	7–2	T–1st		15	
2004	Central Missouri	7–4	5–4	4th			
2005	Central Missouri	7–3	5–3	5th			
2006	Central Missouri	5–6	3–6	T–6th			
2007	Central Missouri	7–4	6–3	T–3rd			
2008	Central Missouri	7–4	5–4	T–4th			
2009	Central Missouri	8–3	6–3	T–2nd			
Central Missouri:		97–47	72–44				
Sam Houston State Bearkats (Southland Conference) (2010–2013)
2010	Sam Houston State	6–5	4–3	T–3rd			
2011	Sam Houston State	14–1	7–0	1st	L NCAA Division I Championship	2	2
2012	Sam Houston State	11–4	6–1	T–1st	L NCAA Division I Championship	2	2
2013	Sam Houston State	9–5	4–3	T–3rd	L NCAA Division I Second Round	13	14
Sam Houston State:		40–15	21–7				
Georgia Southern Eagles (Sun Belt Conference) (2014–2015)
2014	Georgia Southern	9–3	8–0	1st			
2015	Georgia Southern	8–4	6–2	3rd	GoDaddy*		
Georgia Southern:		17–7	14–2	*resigned prior to bowl game			
Tulane Green Wave (American Athletic Conference) (2016–2023)
2016	Tulane	4–8	1–7	6th (West)			
2017	Tulane	5–7	3–5	5th (West)			
2018	Tulane	7–6	5–3	T–1st (West)	W Cure		
2019	Tulane	7–6	3–5	4th (West)	W Armed Forces		
2020	Tulane	6–6	3–5	T–7th	L Famous Idaho Potato		
2021	Tulane	2–10	1–7	T–9th			
2022	Tulane	12–2	7–1	1st	W Cotton^{†}	9	9
2023	Tulane	11–2	8–0	T–1st	Military*		
Tulane:		54–47	31–33	*resigned prior to bowl game			
Houston Cougars (Big 12 Conference) (2024–present)
2024	Houston	4–8	3–6	T–11th			
2025	Houston	10–3	6–3	T–4th	W Texas	19	22
2026	Houston	8–3	5–3				
Houston:		22–14	14–12				
Total:		230–130					
National championship Conference title Conference division title or championship game berth
^{†}Indicates CFP / New Years' Six bowl.; ^{#}Rankings from final Coaches Poll.; ^{°}Rankings from final AP Poll.

== See also ==
- List of college football career coaching wins leaders
