= 1996 Blinn Buccaneers football team =

American college football season

1996 Blinn Buccaneers football

NJCAA champion SWJCFC champion Mineral Water Bowl champion

SWJCFC championship game, W 43–0 vs. Navarro

Mineral Water Bowl, W 43–14 vs. Coffeyville
- Conference: Southwest Junior College Football Conference
- Record: 12–0 (6–0 SWJCFC)
- Head coach: Willie Fritz (4th season)
- Home stadium: Spencer Stadium

1996 Southwest Junior College Football Conference standings
| | Conf. | | | | | Overall |
| Team | W | | L | | T | W | | L | | T |
|---|---|---|---|---|---|---|---|---|---|---|
| Blinn †y$ | 6 | – | 0 | – | 0 | 12 | – | 0 | – | 0 |
| Tyler † | 5 | – | 1 | – | 0 | 8 | – | 2 | – | 0 |
| Navarro †y | 3 | – | 3 | – | 0 | 6 | – | 5 | – | 0 |
| Cisco | 3 | – | 3 | – | 0 | 4 | – | 5 | – | 0 |
| Trinity Valley † | 3 | – | 3 | – | 0 | 4 | – | 6 | – | 0 |
| Kilgore | 1 | – | 5 | – | 0 | 3 | – | 6 | – | 0 |
| Ranger | 0 | – | 6 | – | 0 | 0 | – | 9 | – | 0 |
| NE Oklahoma A&M * | 0 | – | 0 | – | 0 | 5 | – | 4 | – | 0 |
Championship: Blinn 43, Navarro 0
$ – Conference champion; † – Conference playoff participant; y – Championship game participant; * – Northeastern Oklahoma A&M was ineligible for postseason play.

The 1996 Blinn Buccaneers football team was an American football team that represented Blinn College of Brenham, Texas, as a member of the Southwest Junior College Football Conference (SWJCFC) during the 1996 junior college football season. In their fourth and final year under head coach Willie Fritz, the Buccaneers compiled a 12–0 record (6–0 in conference games), defeated Coffeyville in the Mineral Water Bowl, and won the NJCAA National Football Championship. The Buccaneers also won the 1995 national championship and were the first program to win back to back NJCAA National Football Championships.

Fritz was named SJCFC coach of the year, and lineman Hanson Caston was selected as the SJCFC most valuable player. Multiple Blinn players received first-team honors on the 1996 All-SJCFC football team: running back Vaughn Inniss; fullback Wayne Limbrick; center Frank Firestone; guard Lamont Barrett; tackle Jay Olive; punter John Baker; and return specialist Brandon Harrison; defensive end Craig Koontz; defensive lineman Hanson Caston; inside linebacker Michael Jackson; outside linebacker Eric Anderson; and cornerback Brandon Harrison.

== Schedule ==
| Date | Opponent | Site | Result | Attendance | Source |
|---|---|---|---|---|---|
| August 31 | Howard Payne junior varsity* | | W 28–7 | | |
| September 7 | Cisco* | | W 66–7 | | |
| September 21 | Tyler | Spencer Stadium; Brenham, TX | W 37–13 | 2,800 | |
| September 28 | at Navarro | Corsicana, TX | W 21–6 | | |
| October 5 | Cisco | | W 52–7 | | |
| October 12 | Ranger | | W | | |
| October 19 | Trinity Valley | Spencer Stadium; Brenham, TX | W 41–6 | | |
| October 26 | at Kilgore | R.E. St. John Stadium; Kilgore, TX | W 24–8 | 3,000 | |
| November 2 | Northeastern Oklahoma A&M* | Spencer Stadium; Brenham, TX | W 14–7 | | |
| November 9 | Trinity Valley* | Spencer Stadium; Brenham, TX (SWJCFC semifinal) | W 21–0 | | |
| November 16 | Navarro* | Spencer Stadium; Brenham, TX (SWJCFC championship) | W 43–0 | | |
| December 7 | Coffeyville* | Roosevelt Field; Excelsior Springs, MO (Mineral Water Bowl) | W 43–14 | | |
*Non-conference game
