= The Pearce Collections at Navarro College =

Coordinates: 32.077414°N 96.496661°W

Cook Education Center

The Pearce Museum is a museum in Corsicana, Texas, containing two galleries, Western art and American Civil War sections. It is located in the Cook Center at Navarro College.

== Location ==
The Pearce Museum is located in the Cook Center at Navarro College. The museum shares a building with a planetarium, and tickets can be purchased to visit both sections of the Cook Center.

== History ==
Charles and Peggy Pearce originally started collecting art when they had a home in Santa Fe, New Mexico where many contemporary Western artists lived. Their philosophy for the collection is based upon gathering a representative collection from recognized artists while identifying up and coming artists. The Pearce Western Art Collection began when Charles and Peggy Pearce decided to find a permanent home for their growing collection of Western Art. In 1998, they placed about 30 paintings and bronzes in the care of Navarro College in Corsicana, Texas. The benefactors continue to donate new works to the collection.

The Pearce Civil War Collection began in 1991 when Charles S. Pearce Jr. purchased the first document as a gift for his wife, Peggy. That gift, a letter from the battlefield at Antietam written by Joshua Lawrence Chamberlain to his wife Fanny, sparked an ongoing interest that led to the collection of these historically significant documents. In 1996, when the Pearces decided that their collection needed a home where it could be viewed and researched, they placed it in the care of Navarro College. Through the generosity of the Pearces, the collection continues to grow.

== Pearce Western Art Collection ==
The Pearce Western Art Gallery is home to original works of art by acknowledged masters of Western Art as well as recent original works by members of the National Academy of Western Art, the Cowboy Artists of America, and the National Sculpture Society, among others.

The Western Art Collection continues to engage viewers because of its narrow focus. Only contemporary artists are represented, and all pieces in the collection must "tell a story." The dramatic impact of that tale-telling is amplified by the museum's spacious galleries, where 12-foot ceilings have been painted midnight blue to evoke western skies at night.

== Pearce Civil War Collection ==
The Pearce Civil War Gallery is an interactive collection featuring firsthand accounts of the American Civil War. Organized around a time-line of the Civil War, the Pearce Civil War Gallery exhibits and interprets letters, diaries, journals, photographs, and artifacts from the civilians, soldiers, military, political, and civic leaders of the era.

The Pearce Civil War Collection is a collection documenting the Northern and Southern experiences of the Civil War as well as its leaders, common soldiers, and residents. Letters from major military, political, and civic leaders as well as diaries and letters of the common soldier describe the gruesome realities of combat and the desperate loneliness of soldiers in letters to beloved parents, siblings, and friends.

The collection offers online educational materials that reflect a distinct "Lost cause" editorial position.
