= 2015 Georgia Southern Eagles football team =

American college football season

2015 Georgia Southern Eagles football

GoDaddy Bowl champion

GoDaddy Bowl, W 58–27 vs. Bowling Green
- Conference: Sun Belt Conference
- Record: 9–4 (6–2 Sun Belt)
- Head coach: Willie Fritz (2nd season; regular season); Dell McGee (interim; bowl game)
- Offensive coordinator: Doug Ruse (2nd season)
- Offensive scheme: Option
- Defensive coordinator: Jack Curtis (5th season)
- Base defense: 4–3
- Home stadium: Paulson Stadium

2015 Sun Belt Conference football standings
	Conf.			Overall
Team	W		L	W		L
Arkansas State $	8	–	0	9	–	4
Appalachian State	7	–	1	11	–	2
Georgia Southern	6	–	2	9	–	4
Georgia State	5	–	3	6	–	7
South Alabama	3	–	5	5	–	7
Idaho	3	–	5	4	–	8
Louisiana–Lafayette	3	–	5	4	–	8
Troy	3	–	5	4	–	8
New Mexico State	3	–	5	3	–	9
Texas State	2	–	6	3	–	9
Louisiana–Monroe	1	–	7	2	–	11
$ – Conference champion

The 2015 Georgia Southern Eagles football team represented Georgia Southern University in the 2015 NCAA Division I FBS football season. They were led by second-year head coach Willie Fritz and played their home games at Paulson Stadium in Statesboro, Georgia. This season was the Eagles second season in the Sun Belt Conference and the first season for full bowl eligibility. The Eagles finished the regular season 8–4, 6–2 in Sun Belt play to finish in third place. In the Eagles' first ever bowl appearance, the Eagles defeated Bowling Green, 58–27, in the GoDaddy Bowl.

On December 12, head coach Willie Fritz resigned to become the head coach at Tulane. The Eagles were led by assistant head coach and running backs coach Dell McGee in the GoDaddy Bowl.

== Schedule ==
Georgia Southern announced their 2015 football schedule on February 27, 2015. The 2015 schedule consists of six home and away games in the regular season. The Eagles hosted Sun Belt foes Georgia State, New Mexico State, Texas State, and South Alabama, and traveled to Appalachian State, Idaho, Louisiana–Monroe, and Troy.

Date	Time	Opponent	Site	TV	Result	Attendance
September 5	7:30 pm	at West Virginia*	Mountaineer Field; Morgantown, WV	FSN	L 0–44	55,182
September 12	6:00 pm	Western Michigan*	Paulson Stadium; Statesboro, GA	ESPN3	W 43–17	23,520
September 19	6:00 pm	The Citadel*	Paulson Stadium; Statesboro, GA	ESPN3	W 48–13	24,872
September 26	9:00 pm	at Idaho	Kibbie Dome; Moscow, ID	ESPN3	W 44–20	14,441
October 3	7:00 pm	at Louisiana–Monroe	Malone Stadium; Monroe, LA	ESPN3	W 51–31	16,791
October 17	6:00 pm	New Mexico State^{†}	Paulson Stadium; Statesboro, GA	ESPN3	W 56–26	23,551
October 22	7:30 pm	at Appalachian State	Kidd Brewer Stadium; Boone, NC (rivalry)	ESPNU	L 13–31	24,121
October 29	7:30 pm	Texas State	Paulson Stadium; Statesboro, GA	ESPNU	W 37–13	14,212
November 14	3:30 pm	at Troy	Veterans Memorial Stadium; Troy, AL	ESPN3	W 45–10	18,455
November 21	7:00 pm	at Georgia*	Sanford Stadium; Athens, GA	ESPNU	L 17–23 ^{OT}	92,746
November 28	2:00 pm	South Alabama	Paulson Stadium; Statesboro, GA	ESPN3	W 55–17	15,125
December 5	2:00 pm	Georgia State	Paulson Stadium; Statesboro, GA (rivalry)	ESPN3	L 7–34	23,401
December 23	8:00 pm	vs. Bowling Green*	Ladd–Peebles Stadium; Mobile, AL (GoDaddy Bowl)	ESPN	W 58–27	28,656
*Non-conference game; ^{†}Homecoming; All times are in Eastern time

'

== Game summaries ==
=== @ West Virginia ===
Week One: Georgia Southern Eagles at West Virginia Mountaineers – Game summary

Quarter	1	2	3	4	Total
Eagles	0	0	0	0	0
Mountaineers	10	6	14	14	44

at Mountaineer Field, Morgantown, WV

- Date: September 5
- Game time: 7:30 p.m. EDT
- Game weather: 77°F • NNE 5 • Partly cloudy
- Game attendance: 55,182
- Referee: John McDaid
- TV: FSN
- Georgia Southern vs West Virginia

Game information

First quarter

- 10:54 WVU – Jovon Durante 41 yard pass from Skyler Howard (Josh Lambert kick), Mountaineers 7–0. Drive: 9 plays, 87 yards, TOP 4:06.
- 8:05 WVU – Josh Lambert 26 yard field goal, Mountaineers 10–0. Drive: 5 plays, 60 yards, TOP 1:00.

Second quarter

- 14:08 WVU – Josh Lambert 32 yard field goal, Mountaineers 13–0. Drive: 5 plays, 66 yards, TOP 1:02.
- 3:04 WVU – Josh Lambert 22 yard field goal, Mountaineers 16–0. Drive: 7 plays, 65 yards, TOP 2:24.

Third quarter

- 9:12 WVU – Rushel Shell 6 yard run (Josh Lambert kick), Mountaineers 23–0. Drive: 3 plays, 28 yards, TOP 0:49.
- 4:19 WVU – Shelton Gibson 26 yard pass from Skyler Howard (Josh Lambert kick), Mountaineers 30–0. Drive: 4 plays, 70 yards, TOP 1:30.

Fourth quarter

- 13:23 WVU – Wendell Smallwood 19 yard run (Josh Lambert kick), Mountaineers 37–0. 6 plays, 85 yards, TOP 2:21.
- 2:26 WVU – William Crest 2 yard run (Josh Lambert kick), Mountaineers 44–0. 10 plays, 41 yards, TOP 5:21.

Leading Passers

- GS – Favian Upshaw, 2–13, 29 yards, 4 interceptions
- WVU – Skyler Howard, 16–25, 359 yards, 2 touchdowns

Leading Rushers

- GS – Matt Breida, 17 carries, 70 yards
- WVU – Wendell Smallwood, 11 carries, 96 yards, 1 touchdown

Leading Receivers

- GS – Derek Keaton, 1 reception, 17 yards
- WVU – Shelton Gibson, 3 receptions, 130 yards, 1 touchdown

Leading Tacklers

- GS – Matt Dobson, 6 tackles
- WVU – Joseph Karl, 7 tackles

=== Western Michigan ===
Week Two: Western Michigan Broncos at Georgia Southern Eagles – Game summary

Quarter	1	2	3	4	Total
Broncos	3	6	0	8	17
Eagles	7	16	10	10	43

at Paulson Stadium, Statesboro, GA

- Date: September 12
- Game time: 6:00 p.m. EDT
- Game weather: 75°F • 5 mph • Misty
- Game attendance: 23,520
- Referee: Charles Lewis
- TV: ESPN3
- Georgia Southern vs Western Michigan

Game information

First quarter

- 7:40 WMU – Andrew Haldeman 34 yard field goal, Broncos 3–0. Drive: 13 plays, 74 yards, TOP 7:20.
- 3:21 GS – Matt Breida 9 yard run (Alex Hanks kick), Eagles 7–3. Drive: 4 plays, 81 yards, TOP 1:38.

Second quarter

- 11:10 GS – Team 35 yard safety, Eagles 9–3. Drive: 4 plays, -28 yards, TOP 1:33.
- 5:06 GS – Matt Breida 4 yard run (Alex Hanks kick), Eagles 16–3. Drive: 11 plays, 61 yards, TOP 5:58.
- 3:38 GS – Matt Breida 34 yard run (Alex Hanks kick), Eagles 23–3. Drive: 2 plays, 42 yards, TOP 0:38.
- 0:28 WMU – Daniel Braverman 7 yard pass from Zach Terrell (Andrew Haldeman kick failed), Eagles 23–9. Drive: 9 plays, 75 yards, TOP 3:38.

Third quarter

- 14:13 GS – Matt Breida 70 yard run (Alex Hanks kick), Eagles 30–9. Drive: 2 plays, 75 yards, TOP 0:47.
- 9:31 GS – Alex Hanks 22 yard field goal, Eagles 33–9. Drive: 8 plays, 32 yards, TOP 3:54.

Fourth quarter

- 10:51 WMU – Carrington Thompson 13 yard pass from Zach Terrell (Jeremiah Mullinax pass from Zach Terrell for two-point conv.), Eagles 33–17. Drive: 8 plays, 55 yards, TOP 3:58.
- 6:32 GS – LA Ramsby 1 yard run (Alex Hanks kick), Eagles 40–17. Drive: 7 plays, 75 yards, TOP 4:33.
- 4:01 GS – Alex Hanks 25 yard field goal, Eagles 43–17. Drive: 4 plays, 3 yards, TOP 2:17.

Leading Passers

- WMU – Zach Terrell, 24–36, 227 yards, 2 touchdowns, 3 interceptions
- GS – Tavian Upshaw, 1–4, 7 yards

Leading Rushers

- WMU – Jarvion Franklin, 17 carries, 58 yards
- GS – Matt Breida, 11 carries, 176 yards, 4 touchdowns

Leading Receivers

- WMU – Daniel Braverman, 13 receptions, 122 yards, 1 touchdown
- GS – BJ Johnson, 1 reception, 7 yards

Leading Tacklers

- WMU – Asantay Brown, 10 tackles
- GS – Matt Dobson, 9 tackles

=== The Citadel ===
Week Three: The Citadel Bulldogs at Georgia Southern Eagles – Game summary

Quarter	1	2	3	4	Total
Bulldogs	0	0	7	6	13
Eagles	10	21	10	7	48

at Paulson Stadium, Statesboro, GA

- Date: September 19
- Game time: 6:00 p.m. EDT
- Game weather: 88°F • NNE 5 • Partly cloudy
- Game attendance: 24,872
- Referee: Jason McArthur
- TV: ESPN3
- Georgia Southern vs The Citadel

Game information

First quarter

- 11:46 GS – Alex Hanks 22 yard field goal, Eagles 3–0. Drive: 4 plays, 6 yards, TOP 1:44.
- 1:25 GS – Kevin Ellison 1 yard run (Alex Hanks kick), Eagles 10–0. Drive: 16 plays, 55 yards, TOP 7:00.

Second quarter

- 12:35 GS – Matt Breida 25 yard run (Alex Hanks kick), Eagles 17–0. Drive: 5 plays, 66 yards, TOP 2:13.
- 8:43 GS – Matt Breida 87 yard run (Alex Hanks kick), Eagles 24–0. Drive: 1 plays, 87 yards, TOP 0:11.
- 3:50 GS – Kevin Ellison 9 yard run (Alex Hanks kick), Eagles 31–0. Drive: 7 plays, 35 yards, TOP 3:24.

Third quarter

- 11:47 CIT – Evan McField 60 yard run (Eric Goins kick), Eagles 31–7. Drive: 3 plays, 67 yards, TOP 1:17.
- 6:17 GS – LA Ramsby 7 yard run (Alex Hanks kick), Eagles 38–7. Drive: 12 plays, 75 yards, TOP 5:30.
- 4:54 GS – Alex Hanks 40 yard field goal, Eagles 41–7. Drive: 4 plays, 3 yards, TOP 0:43.

Fourth quarter

- 12:50 GS – Wesley Fields 2 yard run (Alex Hanks kick), Eagles 48–7. Drive: 10 plays, 65 yards, TOP 4:48.
- 4:11 CIT – Cam Jackson 6 yard run (two-point pass conv. failed), Eagles 48–13. Drive: 12 plays, 80 yards, TOP 4:57.

Leading Passers

- CIT – Dominique Allen, 2–8, 42 yards, 2 interceptions
- GS – Kevin Ellison, 10–17, 80 yards

Leading Rushers

- CIT – Evan McField, 18 carries, 163 yards, 1 touchdown
- GS – Matt Breida, 13 carries, 164 yards, 2 touchdowns

Leading Receivers

- CIT – Vinny Miller, 1 reception, 29 yards
- GS – Ryan Longoria, 5 receptions, 43 yards

Leading Tacklers

- CIT – James Riley, 12 tackles
- GS – Antwione Williams, 9 tackles

=== @ Idaho ===
Week Four: Georgia Southern Eagles at Idaho Vandals – Game summary

Quarter	1	2	3	4	Total
Eagles	10	6	14	14	44
Vandals	3	10	7	0	20

at Kibbie Dome, Moscow, ID

- Date: September 26
- Game time: 9:00 p.m. EDT
- Game weather: Indoors
- Game attendance: 14,441
- Referee: Kevin Stine
- TV: ESPN3
- Georgia Southern vs Idaho

Game information

First quarter

- 11:38 GS – Alex Hanks 32 yard field goal, Eagles 3–0. Drive: 4 plays, -1 yards, TOP 1:35.
- 1:03 IDA – Rehkow, Austin 18 yard field goal, Tied 3–3. Drive: 15 plays, 93 yards, TOP 7:14.
- 0:47 GS – Matt Breida 83 yard run (Alex Hanks kick), Eagles 10–3. Drive: 1 plays, 83 yards, TOP 0:11.

Second quarter

- 9:45 GS – Alex Hanks 30 yard field goal, Eagles 13–3. Drive: 10 plays, 67 yards, TOP 4:11.
- 8:52 IDA – Dezmon Epps 60 yard pass from Matt Linehan (Austin Rehkow kick), Eagles 13–10. Drive: 3 plays, 80 yards, TOP 0:53.
- 5:13 GS – Alex Hanks 35 yard field goal, Eagles 16–10. Drive: 9 plays, 62 yards, TOP 3:34.
- 1:27 IDA – Austin Rehkow 40 yard field goal, Eagles 16–13. Drive: 11 plays, 57 yards, TOP 3:46.

Third quarter

- 13:28 GS – Matt Breida 66 yard run (Alex Hanks kick), Eagles 23–13. Drive: 3 plays, 78 yards, TOP 1:32.
- 6:14 GS – Wesley Fields 2 yard run (Alex Hanks kick), Eagles 30–13. Drive: 8 plays, 76 yards, TOP 4:21.
- 4:19 IDA – Dezmon Epps 44 yard pass from Matt Linehan (Austin Rehkow kick), Eagles 30–20. Drive: 5 plays, 80 yards, TOP 1:55.

Fourth quarter

- 14:25 GS – Kevin Ellison 5 yard run (Alex Hanks kick), Eagles 37–20. Drive: 3 plays, 42 yards, TOP 1:16.
- 6:21 GS – Kevin Ellison 13 yard run (Alex Hanks kick), Eagles 44–20. Drive: 8 plays, 57 yards, TOP 4:47.

Leading Passers

- GS – Kevin Ellison, 6–14, 105 yards, 1 interception
- IDA – Matt Linehan, 20–35, 299 yards, 2 touchdowns, 2 interceptions

Leading Rushers

- GS – Matt Breida, 12 carries, 184 yards, 2 touchdowns
- IDA – Elijhaa Penny, 23 carries, 89 yards

Leading Receivers

- GS – BJ Johnson, 4 receptions, 93 yards
- IDA – Dezmon Epps, 8 receptions, 165 yards, 2 touchdowns

Leading Tacklers

- GS – Chris DeLaRosa, 9 tackles
- IDA – Jordan Grabski, 10 tackles

=== @ Louisiana–Monroe ===
Week Five: Georgia Southern Eagles at Louisiana–Monroe Warhawks – Game summary

Quarter	1	2	3	4	Total
Eagles	10	21	0	20	51
Warhawks	0	10	7	14	31

at Malone Stadium, Monroe, LA

- Date: October 3
- Game time: 7:00 p.m. EDT
- Game weather: 69°F • NE 12 • Clear skies
- Game attendance: 16,791
- Referee: Jeff Hilyer
- TV: ESPN3
- Georgia Southern vs Louisiana–Monroe

Game information

First quarter

- 12:16 GS – Ken Butler 26 yard blocked punt return (Alex Hanks kick), Eagles 7–0. Drive: 6 plays, 15 yards, TOP 2:44.
- 5:22 GS – Alex Hanks 29 yard field goal, Eagles 10–0. Drive: 11 plays, 31 yards, TOP 5:37.

Second quarter

- 12:58 GS – Matt Breida 13 yard run (Alex Hanks kick), Eagles 17–0. Drive: 9 plays, 64 yards, TOP 3:36.
- 7:07 ULM – Craig Ford 44 yard field goal, Eagles 17–3. Drive: 12 plays, 38 yards, TOP 5:51.
- 5:29 GS – LA Ramsby 1 yard run (Alex Hanks kick), Eagles 24–3. Drive: 4 plays, 72 yards, TOP 1:38.
- 1:31 GS – Wesley Fields 1 yard run (Alex Hanks kick), Eagles 31–3. Drive: 8 plays, 69 yards, TOP 3:07.
- 0:20 ULM – Harley Scioneaux 2 yard pass from Garrett Smith (Craig Ford kick), Eagles 31–10. Drive: 9 plays, 50 yards, TOP 1:11.

Third quarter

- 6:57 ULM – Jared Mapps 12 yard pass from Garrett Smith (Craig Ford kick), Eagles 31–17. Drive: 3 plays, 80 yards, TOP 0:54.

Fourth quarter

- 14:06 ULM – Junior Williams 56 yard interception return (Craig Ford kick), Eagles 31–24. Drive: 3 plays, 1 yard, TOP 1:00.
- 10:59 GS – L.A. Ramsby 41 yard run (Alex Hanks kick), Eagles 38–24. Drive: 6 plays, 61 yards, TOP 3:07.
- 6:04 GS – Matt Breida 6 yard run (Alex Hanks kick), Eagles 45–24. Drive: 5 plays, 37 yards, TOP 2:49.
- 4:00 ULM – D'Marius Gillespie 10 yard pass from Garrett Smith (Craig Ford kick), Eagles 45–31. Drive: 9 plays, 75 yards, TOP 2:04.
- 0:31 GS – Wesley Fields 4 yard run (Alex Hanks kick failed), Eagles 51–31. Drive: 8 plays, 44 yards, TOP 3:29.

Leading Passers

- GS – Kevin Ellison 3/9, 48 yards, 1 interception
- ULM – Garrett Smith 21/36, 232 yards, 3 touchdowns, 3 interceptions

Leading Rushers

- GS – Matt Breida, 19 carries, 149 yards
- ULM – Kaylon Watson, 10 carries, 33 yards

Leading Receivers

- GS – Keigan Williams, 1 reception, 24 yards
- ULM – Ajalen Holley, 8 receptions, 166 yards

Leading Tacklers

- GS – Deshawntee Gallon, 5 tackles
- ULM – Hunter Kissinger, 7 tackles

In their fifth game of the season, the Eagles won, 51–31 over the Louisiana–Monroe Warhawks.

=== New Mexico State ===
Week Seven: New Mexico State Aggies at Georgia Southern Eagles – Game summary

Quarter	1	2	3	4	Total
Aggies	0	7	7	12	26
Eagles	14	21	14	7	56

at Paulson Stadium, Statesboro, GA

- Date: October 17
- Game time: 6:00 p.m. EDT
- Game weather: 73°F • N 7 • Clear
- Game attendance: 23,551
- Referee: Jason McArthur
- TV: ESPN3
- Georgia Southern vs New Mexico State

Game information

First quarter

- 7:23 GS – Wesley Fields 19 yard run (Alex Hanks kick), Eagles 7–0. Drive: 2 plays, 35 yards, TOP 0:33.
- 3:23 GS – Matt Breida 20 yard run (Alex Hanks kick), Eagles 14–0. Drive: 6 plays, 62 yards, TOP 2:36.

Second quarter

- 10:18 GS – Kevin Ellison 67 yard run (Alex Hanks kick), Eagles 21–0. Drive: 2 plays, 59 yards, TOP 0:29.
- 5:18 GS – LA Ramsby 23 yard run (Alex Hanks kick), Eagles 28–0. Drive: 6 plays, 47 yards, TOP 2:46.
- 3:53 NMSU – Jordan Bergstrom 3 yard pass from Andrew Allen (Parker Davidson kick), Eagles 28–7. Drive: 4 plays, 75 yards, TOP 1:25.
- 2:35 GS – Wesley Fields 60 yard pass from Kevin Ellison (Alex Hanks kick), Eagles 35–7. Drive: 3 plays, 74 yards, TOP 1:11.

Third quarter

- 8:19 NMSU – Joshua Bowen 3 yard pass from Andrew Allen (Parker Davidson kick), Eagles 35–14. Drive: 12 plays, 86 yards, TOP 4:34.
- 6:18 GS – LA Ramsby 5 yard run (Alex Hanks kick), Eagles 42–14. Drive: 4 plays, 68 yards, TOP 1:51.
- 5:20 GS – Favian Upshaw 5 yard run (Alex Hanks kick), Eagles 49–14. Drive: 1 play, 5 yards, TOP 0:05.

Fourth quarter

- 13:47 GS – Favian Upshaw 29 yard run (Alex Hanks kick), Eagles 56–14. Drive: 10 plays, 66 yards, TOP 5:10.
- 11:30 NMSU – Joshua Bowen 8 yard pass from Andrew Allen (Parker Davidson kick failed), Eagles 56–20. Drive: 6 plays, 75 yards, TOP 2:17.
- 6:43 NMSU – Will Clement 74 yard fumble return (two-point pass conv. failed), Eagles 56–26. Drive: 8 plays, 49 yards, TOP 4:47.

Leading Passers

- NMSU – Andrew Allen, 20–37, 253 yards, 3 touchdowns, 1 interception
- GS – Kevin Ellison, 2–5, 64 yards, 1 touchdown

Leading Rushers

- NMSU – Larry Rose III, 14 carries, 86 yards
- GS – Matt Breida, 13 carries, 137 yards, 1 touchdown

Leading Receivers

- NMSU – Royce Caldwell, 2 receptions, 67 yards
- GS – Wesley Fields, 1 reception, 60 yards, 1 touchdown

Leading Tacklers

- NMSU – Derek Ibekwe, 14 tackles
- GS – Antwione Williams, 9 tackles

=== @ Appalachian State ===
Week Eight: Georgia Southern Eagles at Appalachian State Mountaineers – Game summary

Quarter	1	2	3	4	Total
Eagles	7	0	0	6	13
Mountaineers	3	14	7	7	31

at Kidd Brewer Stadium, Boone, NC

- Date: October 22
- Game time: 7:30 p.m. EDT
- Game weather: 64°F • W 3 • Clear
- Game attendance: 24,121
- Referee: Jason Autrey
- TV: ESPNU
- Georgia Southern vs Appalachian State

Game information

First quarter

- 11:11 GS – Kevin Ellison 12 yard run (Alex Hanks kick), Eagles 7–0. Drive: 8 plays, 86 yards, TOP 3:49
- 8:35 ASU – Zach Matics 44 yard field goal, Eagles 7–3. Drive: 7 plays, 48 yards, TOP 2:36

Second quarter

- 10:48 ASU – Marcus Cox 18 yard run (Zach Matics kick), Mountaineers 10–7. Drive: 5 plays, 41 yards, TOP 1:51
- 3:48 ASU – Simms McElfresh 9 yard pass from Taylor Lamb (Zach Matics kick), Mountaineers 17–7. Drive: 10 plays, 76 yards, TOP 4:53

Third quarter

- 4:00 ASU – Barrett Burns 33 yard pass from Taylor Lamb (Zach Matics kick), Mountaineers 24–7. Drive: 3 plays, 52 yards, TOP 1:31

Fourth quarter

- 6:33 ASU – Marcus Cox 6 yard run (Zach Matics kick), Mountaineers 31–7. Drive: 13 plays, 65 yards, TOP 7:16
- 3:31 GS – LA Ramsby 19 yard run (two-point run conv. failed), Mountaineers 31–13. Drive: 7 plays, 75 yards, TOP 3:02

Leading Passers

- GS – Kevin Elleson, 5–11, 64 yards, 1 interception
- ASU – Lamb Tylor, 14–20, 202 yards, 2 touchdowns

Leading Rushers

- GS – Matt Brieda, 14 carries, 78 yards
- ASU – Marcus Cox, 21 carries, 90 yards, 2 touchdowns

Leading Receivers

- GS – Myles Campbell, 2 receptions, 46 yards
- ASU – Simms McElfresh, 6 receptions, 66 yards, 1 touchdown

Leading Tacklers

- GS – Antwione Williams, 12 tackles
- ASU – Eric Boggs, 8 tackles

=== Texas State ===
Week Nine: Texas State Bobcats at Georgia Southern Eagles – Game summary

Quarter	1	2	3	4	Total
Bobcats	0	6	7	0	13
Eagles	7	7	10	13	37

at Paulson Stadium, Statesboro, GA

- Date: October 29
- Game time: 7:30 p.m. EDT
- Game weather: 75°F • N 0 • Clear skies
- Game attendance: 14,212
- Referee: Charles Lewis
- TV: ESPNU
- Georgia Southern vs Texas State

Game information

First quarter

- 11:38 GS – Matt Breida 37 yard run (Younghoe Koo kick), Eagles 7–0. Drive: 5 plays, 72 yards, TOP 2:18

Second quarter

- 11:47 GS – Matt Breida 48 yard run (Younghoe Koo kick), Eagles 14–0. Drive: 6 plays, 70 yards, TOP 3:00
- 7:19 TSU – Lumi Kaba 33 yard field goal, Eagles 14–3. Drive: 11 plays, 59 yards, TOP 4:28
- 2:27 TSU – Lumi Kaba 28 yard field goal, Eagles 14–6. Drive: 4 plays, -3 yards, TOP 1:10

Third quarter

- 10:17 GS – Wesley Fields 38 yard run (Younghoe Koo kick), Eagles 21–6. Drive: 10 plays, 75 yards, TOP 4:43
- 7:59 TSU – Jafus Gaines 23 yard pass from Tyler Jones (Lumi Kaba kick), Eagles 21–13. Drive: 7 plays, 75 yards, TOP 2:18
- 3:02 GS – Younghoe Koo 44 yard field goal, Eagles 24–13. Drive: 11 plays, 48 yards, TOP 4:57

Fourth quarter

- 14:55 GS – Younghoe Koo 21 yard field goal, Eagles 27–13. Drive: 4 plays, 7 yards, TOP 2:02
- 12:15 GS – LA Ramsby 7 yard run (Younghoe Koo kick), Eagles 34–13. Drive: 3 plays, 78 yards, TOP 1:19
- 3:49 GS – Younghoe Koo 25 yard field goal, Eagles 37–13. Drive: 9 plays, 88 yards, TOP 6:02

Leading Passers

- TSU – Tyler Jones, 10–25, 87 yards, 1 touchdown, 1 interception
- GS – Kevin Ellison, 2–5, 23 yards

Leading Rushers

- TSU – Robert Lowe, 20 carries, 91 yards
- GS – Matt Breida, 23 carries, 205 yards, 2 touchdowns

Leading Receivers

- TSU – Jafus Gaines, 2 receptions, 38 yards, 1 touchdown
- GS – Ryan Longoria, 2 receptions, 21 yards

Leading Tacklers

- TSU – Ishmael Davis, 10 tackles
- GS – Tay Hicklin, 7 tackles

=== @ Troy ===
Week Eleven: Georgia Southern Eagles at Troy Trojans – Game summary

Quarter	1	2	3	4	Total
Eagles	10	14	7	14	45
Trojans	10	0	0	0	10

at Veterans Memorial Stadium, Troy, AL

- Date: November 14
- Game time: EST
- Game weather: 63°F • Calm • Clear
- Game attendance: 18,455
- Referee: Jason Autrey
- TV: ESPN3
- Georgia Southern vs Troy

Game information

First quarter

- 11:46 TROY – Jed Solomon 20 yard field goal, Trojans 3–0. Drive: 11 plays, 72 yards, TOP 3:14
- 11:28 TROY – Demetrius Cain 19 yard fumble recovery (Jed Solomon kick), Trojans 10–0. Drive: 1 play, -6 yards, TOP 0:18
- 5:19 GS – Matt Breida 3 yard run (Younghoe Koo kick), Trojans 10–7. Drive: 11 plays, 66 yards, TOP 6:09
- 1:47 GS – Younghoe Koo 23 yard field goal, Tied 10–10. Drive: 6 plays, 12 yards, TOP 2:42

Second quarter

- 11:54 GS – Myles Campbell 20 yard run (Younghoe Koo kick), Eagles 17–10. Drive: 4 plays, 80 yards, TOP 2:14
- 1:24 GS – James Dean 23 yard pass from Kevin Ellison (Younghoe Koo kick), Eagles 24–10. Drive: 3 plays, 33 yards, TOP 1:20

Third quarter

- 6:40 GS – LA Ramsby 2 yard run (Younghoe Koo kick), Eagles 31–10. Drive: 15 plays, 83 yards, TOP 8:20

Fourth quarter

- 1:54 GS – Chaz Thornton 2 yard run (Younghoe Koo kick), Eagles 38–10. Drive: 17 plays, 75 yards, TOP 12:01
- 0:38 GS – Riyahd Jones 61 yard fumble recovery (Younghoe Koo kick), Eagles 45–10. Drive: 4 plays, 10 yards, TOP 1:16

Leading Passers

- GS – Kevin Ellison, 2–4, 58 yards, 1 touchdown
- TU – Brandon Silvers, 12–25, 134 yards, 1 interception

Leading Rushers

- GS – Matt Brieda, 17 carries, 84 yards, 1 touchdown
- TU – Brandon Burks, 12 carries, 50 yards

Leading Receivers

- GS – Malik Henry, 1 reception, 35 yards
- TU – Teddy Ruben, 4 receptions, 51 yards

Leading Tacklers

- GS – Antwione Williams, 6 tackles
- TU – Terris Lewis, 12 tackles

=== @ Georgia ===
Week Twelve: Georgia Southern Eagles at Georgia Bulldogs – Game summary

Quarter	1	2	3	4	OT	Total
Eagles	0	7	7	3	0	17
Bulldogs	7	0	7	3	6	23

at Sanford Stadium, Athens, GA

- Date: November 21
- Game time: 7:00 p.m. EST
- Game weather: 52°F • Calm • Overcast
- Game attendance: 92,746
- Referee: David Smith
- TV: ESPNU
- Georgia Southern vs Georgia

Game information

First quarter

- 11:08 UGA – Isaiah McKenzie 23 yard run (Marshall Morgan kick), Bulldogs 7–0. Drive: 7 plays, 61 yards, TOP 3:52

Second quarter

- 3:47 GS – LA Ramsby 1 yard run (Younghoe Koo kick), Tied 7–7. Drive: 11 plays, 69 yards, TOP 6:30

Third quarter

- 12:02 GS – Caleb Williams 62 yard fumble recovery (Younghoe Koo kick), Eagles 14–7. Drive: 2 plays, 19 yards, TOP 0:49
- 1:23 UGA – Terry Godwin 12 yard pass from Greyson Lambert (Marshall Morgan kick), Tied 14–14. Drive: 6 plays, 29 yards, TOP 3:46

Fourth quarter

- 9:21 GS – Younghoe Koo 48 yard field goal, Eagles 17–14. Drive: 13 plays, 44 yards, TOP 7:02
- 6:06 UGA – Marshall Morgan 43 yard field goal, Tied 17–17. Drive: 8 plays, 49 yards, TOP 3:15

Overtime

- 15:00 UGA – Sony Michel 25 yard run, Bulldogs 23–17. Drive: 1 plays, 25 yards, TOP 0:00

Leading Passers

- GS – Favian Upshaw, 3–5, 47 yards
- UGA – Greyson Lambert, 16–25, 183 yards, 1 touchdown

Leading Rushers

- GS – Favian Upshaw, 7 carries, 67 yards
- UGA – Sony Michel, 23 carries, 132 yards, 1 touchdown

Leading Receivers

- GS – BJ Johnson III, 1 reception, 28 yards
- UGA – Malcolm Mitchell, 5 receptions, 73 yards

Leading Tacklers

- GS – Ironhead Gallon, 10 tackles
- UGA – Jordan Jenkins, 13 tackles

=== South Alabama ===
Week Thirteen: South Alabama Jaguars at Georgia Southern Eagles – Game summary

Quarter	1	2	3	4	Total
Jaguars	7	7	3	0	17
Eagles	7	21	17	10	55

at Paulson Stadium, Statesboro, GA

- Date: November 28
- Game time: 2:00 p.m. EST
- Game weather: 73°F • NNE 3 • Sunny
- Game attendance: 15,125
- Referee: Jeff Hilyer
- TV: ESPN3
- Georgia Southern vs South Alabama

Game information

First quarter

- 10:58 USA – Tyreis Thomas 2 yard run (Aleem Sunanon kick), Jaguars 7–0. Drive: 11 plays, 75 yards, TOP 4:02
- 4:42 GS – Kevin Ellison 1 yard run (Younghoe Koo kick), Tied 7–7. Drive: 7 plays, 56 yards, TOP 3:20

Second quarter

- 8:33 USA – Devon Earl 62 yard fumble recovery (Aleem Sunanon kick), Jaguars 14–7.
- 6:28 GS – Matt Breida 1 yard run (Younghoe Koo kick), Tied 14–14. Drive: 6 plays, 76 yards, TOP 1:58
- 1:36 GS – Derek Keaton 23 yard pass from Kevin Ellison (Younghoe Koo kick), Eagles 21–14. Drive: 6 plays, 62 yards, TOP 2:54
- 0:27 GS – Kevin Ellison 2 yard run (Younghoe Koo kick), Eagles 28–14. Drive: 3 plays, 8 yards, TOP 0:38

Third quarter

- 11:39 USA – Aleem Sunanon 24 yard field goal, Eagles 28–17. Drive: 4 plays, 2 yards, TOP 1:16
- 11:26 GS – Matt Breida 75 yard run (Younghoe Koo kick), Eagles 35–17. Drive: 1 plays, 75 yards, TOP 0:13
- 4:25 GS – Younghoe Koo 21 yard field goal, Eagles 38–17. Drive: 11 plays, 56 yards, TOP 6:11
- 0:00 GS – LA Ramsby 46 yard run (Younghoe Koo kick), Eagles 45–17. Drive: 4 plays, 56 yards, TOP 2:02

Fourth quarter

- 7:14 GS – Younghoe Koo 38 yard field goal, Eagles 48–17. Drive: 9 plays, 26 yards, TOP 5:03
- 5:44 GS - Vegas Harley 4 yard run (Younghoe Koo kick), Eagles 55–17. Drive: 1 plays, 4 yards, TOP 0:05

Leading Passers

- USA – Cody Clements, 5–12, 64 yards, 1 interception
- GS – Kevin Ellison, 2–4, 40 yards, 1 touchdown

Leading Rushers

- USA – Tyreis Thomas, 8 carries, 37 yards, 1 touchdown
- GS – Matt Brieda, 21 carries, 187 yards, 2 touchdowns

Leading Receivers

- USA – Gerald Everett, 1 reception, 35 yards
- GS – Derek Keaton, 1 reception, 23 yards, 1 touchdown

Leading Tacklers

- USA – Kalen Jackson, 7 tackles
- GS – Antwione Williams, 7 tackles

=== Georgia State ===
Week Fourteen: Georgia State Panthers at Georgia Southern Eagles – Game summary

Quarter	1	2	3	4	Total
Panthers	0	7	13	14	34
Eagles	0	7	0	0	7

at Paulson Stadium, Statesboro, GA

- Date: December 5
- Game time: 2:00 p.m. EST
- Game weather: 60°F • NNE 9 • Partly cloudy
- Game attendance: 23,401
- Referee: Charles Lewis
- TV: ESPN3
- Georgia Southern vs Georgia State

Game information

First quarter

- No scoring

Second quarter

- 14:07 GSU – Penny Hart 63 yard pass from Nick Arbuckle (Wil Lutz kick), Panthers 7–0. Drive: 4 plays, 85 yards, TOP 1:00
- 10:32 GS – LA Ramsby 1 yard run (Younghoe Koo kick), Tied 7–7. Drive: 8 plays, 63 yards, TOP 3:30

Third quarter

- 9:57 GSU – Robert Davis 18 yard pass from Nick Arbuckle (two-point pass conv. failed), Panthers 13–7. Drive: 5 plays, 81 yards, TOP 1:57
- 5:10 GSU – Keith Rucker 4 yard pass from Nick Arbuckle (Wil Lutz kick), Panthers 20–7. Drive: 5 plays, 85 yards, TOP 2:16

Fourth quarter

- 14:14 GSU – Kyler Neal 1 yard run (Wil Lutz kick), Panthers 27–7. Drive: 9 plays, 56 yards, TOP 4:04
- 8:31 GSU – Kyler Neal 28 yard run (Wil Lutz kick), Panthers 34–7. Drive: 8 plays, 87 yards, TOP 4:40

Leading Passers

- GSU – Nick Arbuckle, 20–32, 346 yards, 3 touchdowns, 1 interception
- GS – Kevin Ellison, 4–13, 53 yards, 2 interceptions

Leading Rushers

- GSU – Glenn Smith, 13 carries, 83 yards
- GS – LA Ramsby, 15 carries, 65 yards, 1 touchdown

Leading Receivers

- GSU – Penny Hart, 7 receptions, 129 yards, 1 touchdown
- GS – BJ Johnson III, 4 receptions, 57 yards

Leading Tacklers

- GSU – Joseph Peterson, 9 tackles
- GS – Matt Dobson, 9 tackles

=== Bowling Green–GoDaddy Bowl ===
GoDaddy Bowl: Georgia Southern Eagles vs. Bowling Green Falcons – Game summary

Quarter	1	2	3	4	Total
Eagles	9	14	21	14	58
Falcons	13	14	0	0	27

at Ladd–Peebles Stadium, Mobile, LA

- Date: December 23
- Game time: 8:00 p.m. EST
- Game weather: 72°F • S 19 • Cloudy
- Game attendance: 28,656
- Referee: Scott Campbell
- TV: ESPN
- Georgia Southern vs Bowling Green (2015 GoDaddy Bowl)

Game information

First quarter

- 8:52 GS – LA Ramsby 1 yard run (Younghoe Koo kick), Eagles 7–0. Drive: 9 plays, 78 yards, TOP 4:34
- 7:29 BGSU – Roger Lewis 45 yard pass from Matt Johnson (Tyler Tate kick blocked), Eagles 7–6. Drive: 6 plays, 75 yards, TOP 1:23
- 7:29 GS – Matt Dobson 98 yard PAT return, Eagles 9–6. Drive: 6 plays, 75 yards, TOP 1:23
- 0:33 BGSU – Ronnie Moore 15 yard pass from Matt Johnson (Tyler Tate kick), Falcons 13–9. Drive: 7 plays, 75 yards, TOP 1:42

Second quarter

- 11:42 BGSU – Gehrig Dieter 51 yard pass from Matt Johnson (Tyler Tate kick), Falcons 20–9. Drive: 1 plays, 51 yards, TOP 0:08
- 7:53 GS – Wesley Fields 26 yard run (Younghoe Koo kick), Falcons 20–16. Drive: 7 plays, 75 yards, TOP 3:49
- 1:27 GS – Montay Crockett 31 yard pass from Kevin Ellison (Younghoe Koo kick), Eagles 23–20. Drive: 12 plays, 92 yards, TOP 5:15
- 0:36 BGSU – Travis Greene 5 yard run (Tyler Tate kick), Falcons 27–23. Drive: 5 plays, 66 yards, TOP 0:51

Third quarter

- 7:28 GS – Favian Upshaw 3 yard run (Younghoe Koo kick), Eagles 30–27. Drive: 14 plays, 75 yards, TOP 7:32
- 2:55 GS – Favian Upshaw 80 yard run (Younghoe Koo kick), Eagles 37–27. Drive: 1 plays, 80 yards, TOP 0:11
- 1:51 GS – Matt Breida 1 yard run (Younghoe Koo kick), Eagles 44–20. Drive: 2 plays, 14 yards, TOP 0:23

Fourth quarter

- 14:55 GS – Favian Upshaw 8 yard run (Younghoe Koo kick), Eagles 51–27. Drive: 2 plays, 10 yards, TOP 0:48
- 5:25 GS - Favian Upshaw 42 yard run (Younghoe Koo kick), Eagles 58–27. Drive: 6 plays, 80 yards, TOP 3:59

Leading Passers

- GS – Kevin Ellison, 3–5, 65 yards, 1 touchdown
- BGSU – Matt Johnson, 15–34, 246 yards, 3 touchdowns

Leading Rushers

- GS – Favian Upshaw, 12 carries, 199 yards, 4 touchdowns
- BGSU – Travis Greene, 10 carries, 79 yards, 1 touchdown

Leading Receivers

- GS – Montay Crockett, 1 reception, 31 yards, 1 touchdown
- BGSU – Ronnie Moore, 5 receptions, 83 yards, 1 touchdown

Leading Tacklers

- GS – Antwione Williams, 10 tackles
- BGSU – Austin Valdez, 11 tackles
