= Perry D. "Peno" Graham Field =

Baseball park in Corsicana, Texas, US

- Interactive map of Perry D. "Peno" Graham Field
- Full name: Perry D. "Peno" Graham Field
- Location: Corsicana, Texas
- Coordinates: 32.07422°N 96.50153°W
- Owner: Navarro College
- Operator: Navarro College
- Field size: 330 LF; 375 LCF; 400 CF; 375 RCF; 330 RF

Tenant
- Navarro College

Perry D. "Peno" Graham Field is a baseball park located in Corsicana, Texas. It is the home of the Navarro College Bulldogs baseball team.
