= Harry Fritz (coach) =

American sports coach and collegiate athletics administrator

Biographical details
- Born: June 13, 1920; Wheelersburg, Ohio, U.S.
- Died: May 27, 1987 (aged 66); Kansas City, Missouri, U.S.

Playing career

Basketball
- 1938–1940: Rio Grande
- 1940–1942: Transylvania

Coaching career (HC unless noted)

Football
- 1952: Central Missouri

Basketball
- 1946–1948: Transylvania (assistant)
- 1954–1958: Bemidji State

Baseball
- 1947–1948: Transylvania
- 1956: Bemidji State
- 1958: Bemidji State

Administrative career (AD unless noted)
- 1959–?: Bemidji State
- 1964–1970: Western Illinois
- 1970–1976: Buffalo

Head coaching record
- Overall: 39–48 (basketball)

Harry G. Fritz (June 13, 1920 – May 27, 1987) was a collegiate athletics administrator and an American football, basketball, and baseball coach. He served as the head football coach at the University of Central Missouri in Warrensburg, Missouri in 1952. Fritz was also the head baseball coach at his alma mater, Transylvania University in Lexington, Kentucky from 1947 to 1948. Before his retirement, he served as the head of the National Association of Intercollegiate Athletics.

Fritz was the father of current University of Houston football coach Willie Fritz.

== Head coaching record ==
=== Football ===
Year	Team	Overall	Conference	Standing	Bowl/playoffs
Central Missouri State Mules (Missouri Intercollegiate Athletic Association) (1952)
1952	Central Missouri State	1–6	1–4	T–5th	
Central Missouri State:		1–6	1–4		
Total:		1–6			
