= Red River Bowl =

The Red River Bowl was an annual National Junior College Athletic Association (NJCAA) junior college football bowl game that was held from 1997 to 2002 at Pennington Field in Bedford, Texas.Trinity Valley defeated Garden City in 1997 to win the NJCAA National Football Championship. From 1999 to 2001, the Red River Bowl was served as the Southwest Junior College Football Conference (SWJCFC) championship game.

== Game results ==
Date	Winner		Loser		Attendance	References
December 6, 1997	Trinity Valley	48	Garden City	13		
December 5, 1998	Northeastern Oklahoma A&M	31	Coffeyville	0	1,200	
December 4, 1999	Trinity Valley	48	Navarro	14	3,113	
December 2, 2000	Tyler	23	Northeastern Oklahoma A&M	21		
December 1, 2001	Kilgore	14	Tyler	7	7,000	
December 7, 2002	Northeastern Oklahoma A&M	27	Erie	21		
