= Southwest Junior College Football Conference =

American football association in the southwest United States

The Southwest Junior College Football Conference (SWJCFC or SJCFC) is a football conference for National Junior College Athletic Association (NJCAA) teams located in the Southwestern United States. The conference formed in 1963 with nine junior colleges located in Texas, and began operation in 1964. It was known as the Texas Junior College Football Federation (TJCFF) prior to 1976 and then as the Texas Junior College Football Conference (TJCFC) until 1996 when Northeastern Oklahoma A&M College joined as a member.

== Current members ==
School	Team name	Location	Primary conference
Blinn College	Buccaneers	Brenham, Texas	SJCC
Cisco College	Wranglers	Cisco, Texas	NTJCAC
Kilgore College	Rangers	Kilgore, Texas	SJCC
Navarro College	Bulldogs	Corsicana, Texas	SJCC
New Mexico Military Institute	Broncos	Roswell, New Mexico	WJCAC
Snow College	Badgers	Ephraim, Utah	SWAC
Trinity Valley Community College	Cardinals	Athens, Texas	SJCC
Tyler Junior College	Apaches	Tyler, Texas	SJCC

== Former members ==
Includes members of the SJCFC's predecessor conferences: the Texas Junior College Conference and the Texas Eastern Conference.

- Allen Academy (eliminated college programs)
- Hillsboro Junior College (closed, reopened as Hill College; dropped football)
- Lon Morris College (closed)
- Northeastern Oklahoma A&M College (left to become independent following 2025 season)
- Odessa College (dropped football)
- Panola College (dropped football)
- Paris Junior College (dropped football)
- Ranger College (dropped football)
- Southwest Texas Junior College (dropped football)
- Texarkana College (dropped football)
- Wharton County Junior College (dropped football)

== Champions ==
Pre-1964 titles listed were won in the SJCFC's predecessor conferences: the Texas Junior College Conference and the Texas Eastern Conference.

- Trinity Valley (known as Henderson County until 1986) (17 titles, 11 outright): 2014, 2005, 1999, 1997, 1994, 1991*, 1988, 1984, 1983, 1973*, 1968*, 1967, 1966*, 1965, 1959, 1958, 1953*, 1952*
- Kilgore (16 titles, 12 outright): 2022, 2018, 2015, 2004, 2001, 1992*, 1990, 1982, 1980, 1978, 1977*, 1975, 1970, 1968*, 1966*, 1946
- Tyler (11 titles, 8 outright): 2000, 1993*, 1992*, 1991*, 1986, 1985, 1981, 1979, 1974, 1971, 1969
- Navarro (12 titles, 6 outright): 2019, 2007, 1993*, 1989, 1977*, 1976, 1973*, 1962*, 1961, 1953*, 1952, 1951
- Blinn (6 titles, 6 outright): 2009, 2006, 1996, 1995, 1987, 1972
- Northeastern Oklahoma A&M (3 titles, 3 outright): 2003, 2002, 1998
- Texarkana (3 titles, 2 outright): 1964, 1957, 1955*
- Wharton County (3 titles, 1 outright): 1963, 1962*, 1948*
- Panola (2 titles, 2 outright): 1950, 1949
- Paris (2 titles, 1 outright): 1955*, 1954
- Ranger (2 titles, 1 outright): 1960, 1948*
- Allen (1 title, 1 outright): 1956
- Hillsboro (now Hill College) (1 title, 0 outright): 1947*
- Southwest Texas (1 title, 0 outright): 1947*

(*) denotes shared title

== Yearly standings ==
1964 Texas Junior College Football Federation standings
	Conf.					Overall
Team	W		L		T	W		L		T
Texarkana $	6	–	1	–	1	7	–	3	–	1
Wharton	5	–	1	–	2	6	–	1	–	2
Henderson County	5	–	2	–	1	7	–	3	–	1
Kilgore	4	–	3	–	1	6	–	3	–	1
Navarro	4	–	4	–	0	4	–	5	–	0
Tyler	4	–	4	–	0	6	–	5	–	0
Cisco	2	–	3	–	3	2	–	4	–	3
Ranger	1	–	6	–	1	1	–	7	–	1
Blinn	0	–	7	–	1	0	–	8	–	1
$ – Conference champion

1965 Texas Junior College Football Federation standings
	Conf.					Overall
Team	W		L		T	W		L		T
Henderson County $	7	–	0	–	0	10	–	1	–	0
Kilgore	4	–	3	–	0	8	–	3	–	0
Navarro	4	–	3	–	0	5	–	3	–	0
Blinn	3	–	3	–	1	4	–	3	–	1
Wharton	3	–	3	–	1	4	–	3	–	1
Tyler	3	–	4	–	0	4	–	6	–	0
Cisco	3	–	4	–	0	5	–	4	–	0
Ranger	0	–	7	–	0	0	–	9	–	0
$ – Conference champion

1966 Texas Junior College Football Federation standings
	Conf.					Overall
Team	W		L		T	W		L		T
Henderson County +	6	–	1	–	0	10	–	1	–	0
Kilgore +	6	–	1	–	0	10	–	1	–	0
Cisco	5	–	2	–	0	7	–	2	–	0
Navarro	3	–	4	–	0	5	–	6	–	0
Tyler	3	–	4	–	0	4	–	6	–	0
Blinn	2	–	5	–	0	3	–	6	–	0
Ranger	2	–	5	–	0	3	–	7	–	0
Wharton	1	–	6	–	0	3	–	7	–	0
+ – Conference co-champions

1967 Texas Junior College Football Federation standings
	Conf.					Overall
Team	W		L		T	W		L		T
Henderson County $	6	–	1	–	0	8	–	3	–	0
Cisco	5	–	1	–	1	7	–	2	–	1
Kilgore	4	–	3	–	0	5	–	5	–	0
Navarro	4	–	3	–	0	5	–	5	–	0
Tyler	3	–	4	–	0	7	–	4	–	0
Blinn	2	–	4	–	1	4	–	4	–	1
Wharton	2	–	5	–	0	3	–	7	–	0
Ranger	0	–	7	–	0	1	–	8	–	0
$ – Conference champion

1968 Texas Junior College Football Federation standings
	Conf.					Overall
Team	W		L		T	W		L		T
Henderson County +	6	–	1	–	0	8	–	3	–	0
Kilgore +	6	–	1	–	0	7	–	3	–	0
Blinn	5	–	2	–	0	6	–	3	–	0
Tyler	3	–	4	–	0	5	–	5	–	0
Navarro	3	–	4	–	0	3	–	7	–	0
Cisco	2	–	5	–	0	4	–	6	–	0
Wharton	2	–	5	–	0	4	–	6	–	0
Ranger	1	–	6	–	0	1	–	8	–	0
+ – Conference co-champions

1969 Texas Junior College Football Federation standings
	Conf.					Overall
Team	W		L		T	W		L		T
Tyler $	7	–	0	–	0	10	–	1	–	0
Blinn	6	–	1	–	0	7	–	2	–	0
Henderson County	4	–	3	–	0	7	–	3	–	0
Kilgore	3	–	4	–	0	4	–	6	–	0
Wharton	2	–	5	–	0	4	–	6	–	0
Cisco	2	–	5	–	0	4	–	6	–	0
Navarro	2	–	5	–	0	3	–	7	–	0
Ranger	2	–	5	–	0	2	–	6	–	0
$ – Conference champion

1970 Texas Junior College Football Federation standings
	Conf.					Overall
Team	W		L		T	W		L		T
Kilgore $	6	–	0	–	1	7	–	2	–	1
Navarro	6	–	1	–	0	11	–	1	–	0
Tyler	5	–	1	–	1	7	–	2	–	1
Henderson County	4	–	3	–	0	4	–	6	–	0
Blinn	3	–	4	–	0	5	–	5	–	0
Wharton	2	–	5	–	0	2	–	7	–	1
Cisco	1	–	6	–	0	3	–	7	–	0
Ranger	0	–	7	–	0	2	–	8	–	0
$ – Conference champion

1971 Texas Junior College Football Federation standings
	Conf.					Overall
Team	W		L		T	W		L		T
Tyler $	7	–	0	–	0	9	–	2	–	0
Kilgore	6	–	1	–	0	8	–	2	–	1
Wharton	5	–	2	–	0	7	–	3	–	0
Navarro	4	–	3	–	0	6	–	3	–	1
Blinn	2	–	4	–	0	4	–	5	–	0
Henderson County	2	–	5	–	0	3	–	7	–	0
Cisco	1	–	5	–	0	4	–	5	–	0
Ranger	0	–	7	–	0	0	–	9	–	0
$ – Conference champion

1972 Texas Junior College Football Federation standings
	Conf.					Overall
Team	W		L		T	W		L		T
Blinn $	7	–	0	–	0	10	–	0	–	0
Navarro	5	–	2	–	0	7	–	3	–	0
Tyler	5	–	2	–	0	7	–	3	–	0
Kilgore	4	–	3	–	0	6	–	4	–	0
Henderson County	3	–	4	–	0	3	–	7	–	0
Wharton	2	–	5	–	0	3	–	6	–	0
Ranger	2	–	5	–	0	2	–	8	–	0
Cisco	0	–	7	–	0	1	–	8	–	0
$ – Conference champion

1973 Texas Junior College Football Federation standings
	Conf.					Overall
Team	W		L		T	W		L		T
Navarro +	6	–	1	–	0	10	–	1	–	0
Henderson County +	6	–	1	–	0	8	–	2	–	0
Wharton	5	–	2	–	0	6	–	4	–	0
Blinn	3	–	4	–	0	6	–	4	–	0
Kilgore	3	–	4	–	0	4	–	6	–	0
Tyler	3	–	4	–	0	4	–	6	–	0
Ranger	1	–	6	–	0	3	–	6	–	0
Cisco	1	–	6	–	0	3	–	8	–	0
+ – Conference co-champions

1974 Texas Junior College Football Federation standings
	Conf.					Overall
Team	W		L		T	W		L		T
Tyler $	7	–	0	–	0	7	–	2	–	0
Navarro	4	–	2	–	1	6	–	2	–	1
Henderson County	4	–	2	–	1	6	–	2	–	1
Kilgore	4	–	3	–	0	6	–	3	–	1
Blinn	3	–	3	–	1	4	–	3	–	2
Wharton	2	–	4	–	1	3	–	6	–	1
Cisco	2	–	5	–	0	3	–	6	–	0
Ranger	0	–	7	–	0	3	–	7	–	0
$ – Conference champion

1975 Texas Junior College Football Federation standings
	Conf.					Overall
Team	W		L		T	W		L		T
Kilgore $	5	–	1	–	0	8	–	3	–	0
Navarro	4	–	2	–	0	5	–	6	–	0
Blinn	3	–	3	–	0	7	–	4	–	0
Tyler	3	–	3	–	0	6	–	5	–	0
Wharton	2	–	3	–	1	5	–	5	–	1
Henderson County	2	–	3	–	1	3	–	7	–	1
Ranger	1	–	5	–	0	3	–	7	–	0
$ – Conference champion

1976 Texas Junior College Football Conference standings
	Conf.					Overall
Team	W		L		T	W		L		T
Navarro $	8	–	2	–	0	8	–	2	–	0
Blinn	7	–	3	–	0	7	–	3	–	0
Henderson County	5	–	5	–	0	5	–	5	–	0
Tyler	4	–	6	–	0	4	–	6	–	0
Wharton	4	–	6	–	0	4	–	6	–	0
Kilgore	2	–	8	–	0	2	–	8	–	0
$ – Conference champion

1977 Texas Junior College Football Conference standings
	Conf.					Overall
Team	W		L		T	W		L		T
Navarro +	8	–	2	–	0	9	–	2	–	0
Kilgore +	8	–	2	–	0	8	–	2	–	0
Blinn	5	–	4	–	1	5	–	4	–	1
Henderson County	3	–	6	–	1	3	–	6	–	1
Tyler	3	–	6	–	1	3	–	6	–	1
Wharton	1	–	8	–	1	1	–	8	–	1
+ – Conference co-champions

1978 Texas Junior College Football Conference standings
	Conf.					Overall
Team	W		L		T	W		L		T
Kilgore $	9	–	0	–	1	10	–	0	–	1
Navarro	7	–	3	–	0	7	–	3	–	0
Tyler	6	–	3	–	1	6	–	3	–	1
Blinn	4	–	6	–	0	4	–	6	–	0
Henderson County	3	–	7	–	0	3	–	7	–	0
Wharton	0	–	10	–	0	0	–	10	–	0
$ – Conference champion

1979 Texas Junior College Football Conference standings
	Conf.					Overall
Team	W		L		T	W		L		T
Tyler $	7	–	3	–	0	7	–	4	–	0
Blinn	6	–	4	–	0	6	–	4	–	0
Henderson County	6	–	4	–	0	6	–	4	–	0
Navarro	6	–	4	–	0	6	–	4	–	0
Kilgore	5	–	5	–	0	5	–	5	–	0
Wharton	0	–	10	–	0	0	–	10	–	0
$ – Conference champion

1980 Texas Junior College Football Conference standings
	Conf.					Overall
Team	W		L		T	W		L		T
Kilgore $	10	–	0	–	0	10	–	1	–	0
Navarro	7	–	3	–	0	7	–	3	–	0
Blinn	6	–	4	–	0	6	–	4	–	0
Tyler	4	–	6	–	0	4	–	6	–	0
Henderson County	2	–	7	–	1	2	–	7	–	1
Wharton	0	–	9	–	1	0	–	9	–	1
$ – Conference champion

1981 Texas Junior College Football Conference standings
	Conf.					Overall
Team	W		L		T	W		L		T
Kilgore +	4	–	1	–	0	8	–	2	–	0
Tyler +	4	–	1	–	0	8	–	2	–	1
Navarro	3	–	2	–	0	7	–	3	–	0
Henderson County	2	–	3	–	0	4	–	6	–	0
Wharton	1	–	4	–	0	4	–	6	–	0
Blinn	1	–	4	–	0	2	–	8	–	0
+ – Conference co-champions

1982 Texas Junior College Football Conference standings
	Conf.					Overall
Team	W		L		T	W		L		T
Kilgore $	4	–	1	–	0	7	–	4	–	0
Navarro	3	–	2	–	0	7	–	3	–	0
Tyler	3	–	2	–	0	5	–	5	–	0
Henderson County	3	–	2	–	0	4	–	6	–	0
Wharton	2	–	3	–	0	6	–	4	–	0
Blinn	0	–	5	–	0	5	–	5	–	0
$ – Conference champion

1983 Texas Junior College Football Conference standings
	Conf.					Overall
Team	W		L		T	W		L		T
Henderson County $	4	–	0	–	1	8	–	3	–	0
Navarro	4	–	1	–	0	8	–	2	–	0
Tyler	2	–	2	–	1	4	–	5	–	1
Kilgore	2	–	3	–	0	6	–	4	–	0
Blinn	2	–	3	–	0	4	–	6	–	0
Wharton	0	–	5	–	0	2	–	8	–	0
$ – Conference champion

1984 Texas Junior College Football Conference standings
	Conf.					Overall
Team	W		L		T	W		L		T
Henderson County $	6	–	2	–	0	8	–	3	–	0
Tyler	5	–	2	–	1	7	–	3	–	1
Kilgore	5	–	3	–	0	6	–	4	–	0
Blinn	2	–	5	–	1	4	–	5	–	1
Wharton	1	–	7	–	0	3	–	7	–	0
$ – Conference champion

1985 Texas Junior College Football Conference standings
	Conf.					Overall
Team	W		L		T	W		L		T
Tyler $	5	–	1	–	0	9	–	2	–	0
Cisco	3	–	2	–	1	6	–	4	–	1
Navarro	3	–	3	–	0	5	–	4	–	0
Ranger	3	–	3	–	0	5	–	4	–	0
Kilgore	3	–	3	–	0	5	–	4	–	1
Henderson County	3	–	3	–	0	4	–	5	–	1
Blinn	0	–	5	–	1	1	–	7	–	1
$ – Conference champion

1986 Texas Junior College Football Conference standings
	Conf.					Overall
Team	W		L		T	W		L		T
Tyler $	6	–	0	–	0	8	–	3	–	0
Ranger	3	–	3	–	0	6	–	3	–	1
Kilgore	3	–	3	–	0	6	–	4	–	0
Navarro	3	–	3	–	0	5	–	5	–	0
Blinn	3	–	3	–	0	4	–	6	–	0
Cisco	2	–	4	–	0	5	–	5	–	0
Trinity Valley	1	–	5	–	0	1	–	9	–	0
$ – Conference champion

1987 Texas Junior College Football Conference standings
	Conf.					Overall
Team	W		L		T	W		L		T
Blinn $	5	–	1	–	0	9	–	2	–	0
Cisco	4	–	2	–	0	8	–	2	–	0
Navarro	4	–	2	–	0	8	–	2	–	1
Tyler	3	–	3	–	0	4	–	6	–	0
Ranger	2	–	4	–	0	4	–	5	–	1
Kilgore	2	–	4	–	0	2	–	8	–	0
Trinity Valley	1	–	5	–	0	4	–	6	–	0
$ – Conference champion

1988 Texas Junior College Football Conference standings
	Conf.					Overall
Team	W		L		T	W		L		T
Trinity Valley $	5	–	0	–	1	9	–	1	–	1
Navarro	5	–	1	–	0	7	–	3	–	0
Tyler	4	–	2	–	0	6	–	4	–	0
Blinn	3	–	2	–	1	3	–	6	–	1
Cisco	2	–	4	–	0	6	–	4	–	0
Kilgore	1	–	5	–	0	3	–	7	–	0
Ranger	0	–	6	–	0	3	–	7	–	0
$ – Conference champion

1989 Texas Junior College Football Conference standings
	Conf.					Overall
Team	W		L		T	W		L		T
Navarro $	6	–	0	–	0	10	–	0	–	0
Kilgore	4	–	2	–	0	6	–	5	–	0
Ranger	3	–	3	–	0	5	–	5	–	0
Trinity Valley	3	–	3	–	0	5	–	5	–	0
Cisco	2	–	4	–	0	6	–	4	–	0
Blinn	2	–	4	–	0	2	–	8	–	0
Tyler	1	–	5	–	0	3	–	7	–	0
$ – Conference champion

1990 Texas Junior College Football Conference standings
	Conf.					Overall
Team	W		L		T	W		L		T
Kilgore $	6	–	0	–	0	9	–	2	–	0
Navarro	5	–	1	–	0	7	–	3	–	0
Cisco	3	–	2	–	1	6	–	3	–	1
Tyler	2	–	3	–	1	6	–	3	–	1
Ranger	1	–	4	–	1	3	–	4	–	1
Blinn	1	–	4	–	1	1	–	8	–	1
Trinity Valley	1	–	5	–	0	2	–	8	–	0
$ – Conference champion

1991 Texas Junior College Football Conference standings
	Conf.					Overall
Team	W		L		T	W		L		T
Tyler +	5	–	0	–	1	7	–	3	–	1
Trinity Valley +	5	–	0	–	1	6	–	3	–	1
Navarro	4	–	2	–	0	9	–	2	–	0
Cisco	3	–	3	–	0	6	–	4	–	0
Ranger	2	–	4	–	0	5	–	5	–	0
Blinn	1	–	5	–	0	2	–	8	–	0
Kilgore	0	–	6	–	0	4	–	6	–	0
+ – Conference co-champions

1992 Texas Junior College Football Conference standings
	Conf.					Overall
Team	W		L		T	W		L		T
Tyler +	5	–	1	–	0	9	–	2	–	0
Kilgore +	5	–	1	–	0	6	–	4	–	0
Navarro	4	–	2	–	0	8	–	2	–	0
Cisco	3	–	3	–	0	7	–	4	–	0
Blinn	2	–	4	–	0	3	–	7	–	0
Trinity Valley	2	–	4	–	0	3	–	7	–	0
Ranger	0	–	6	–	0	3	–	7	–	0
+ – Conference co-champions

1993 Texas Junior College Football Conference standings
	Conf.					Overall
Team	W		L		T	W		L		T
Navarro +	5	–	1	–	0	8	–	1	–	2
Tyler +	5	–	1	–	0	6	–	4	–	0
Trinity Valley	4	–	1	–	1	8	–	1	–	2
Blinn	3	–	2	–	1	6	–	3	–	1
Ranger	1	–	4?	–	0	1	–	8?	–	0
Kilgore	1	–	5	–	0	1	–	9	–	0
Cisco	0	–	5?	–	0	1	–	8?	–	0
+ – Conference co-champions

1994 Texas Junior College Football Conference standings
	Conf.					Overall
Team	W		L		T	W		L		T
Trinity Valley $	6	–	0	–	0	12	–	0	–	0
Blinn	5	–	1	–	0	9	–	2	–	0
Kilgore	3	–	3	–	0	6	–	4	–	0
Tyler	3	–	3	–	0	4	–	6	–	0
Cisco	2	–	4	–	0	2	–	7	–	0
Navarro	1	–	6	–	0	2	–	8	–	0
Ranger	1	–	5	–	0	2	–	9	–	0
$ – Conference champion

1995 Texas Junior College Football Conference standings
	Conf.					Overall
Team	W		L		T	W		L		T
Blinn †y$	6	–	0	–	0	12	–	0	–	0
Kilgore †	4	–	2	–	0	6	–	4	–	0
Cisco †y	4	–	2	–	0	6	–	5	–	0
Trinity Valley †	3	–	3	–	0	5	–	5	–	0
Ranger	2	–	4	–	0	3	–	6	–	0
Tyler	2	–	4	–	0	3	–	6	–	0
Navarro *	0	–	6	–	0	0	–	9	–	0
Championship: Blinn 51, Cisco 19
$ – Conference champion; † – Conference playoff participant; y – Championship game participant; * – Navarro forfeited six victories including four conference wins.

1996 Southwest Junior College Football Conference standings
	Conf.					Overall
Team	W		L		T	W		L		T
Blinn †y$	6	–	0	–	0	12	–	0	–	0
Tyler †	5	–	1	–	0	8	–	2	–	0
Navarro †y	3	–	3	–	0	6	–	5	–	0
Cisco	3	–	3	–	0	4	–	5	–	0
Trinity Valley †	3	–	3	–	0	4	–	6	–	0
Kilgore	1	–	5	–	0	3	–	6	–	0
Ranger	0	–	6	–	0	0	–	9	–	0
NE Oklahoma A&M *	0	–	0	–	0	5	–	4	–	0
Championship: Blinn 43, Navarro 0
$ – Conference champion; † – Conference playoff participant; y – Championship game participant; * – Northeastern Oklahoma A&M was ineligible for postseason play.

1997 Southwest Junior College Football Conference standings
	Conf.					Overall
Team	W		L		T	W		L		T
Trinity Valley †y$	7	–	0	–	0	12	–	0	–	0
Blinn †y	5	–	2	–	0	8	–	3	–	0
Tyler †	4	–	3	–	0	6	–	5	–	0
Cisco †	4	–	3	–	0	4	–	6	–	0
NE Oklahoma A&M	3	–	4	–	0	5	–	3	–	0
Kilgore	3	–	4	–	0	4	–	5	–	0
Navarro	2	–	5	–	0	3	–	6	–	0
Ranger	0	–	7	–	0	2	–	7	–	0
SWJCFC championship: Trinity Valley 43, Blinn 8
$ – Conference champion; † – Conference playoff participant; y – Championship game participant

1998 Southwest Junior College Football Conference standings
	Conf.					Overall
Team	W		L		T	W		L		T
Trinity Valley †	6	–	1	–	0	7	–	3	–	0
Tyler †	6	–	1	–	0	7	–	3	–	0
NE Oklahoma A&M †y$	5	–	2	–	0	9	–	3	–	0
Navarro †y	5	–	2	–	0	7	–	4	–	0
Blinn	3	–	4	–	0	5	–	4	–	0
Kilgore	2	–	5	–	0	2	–	7	–	0
Ranger	1	–	6	–	0	2	–	6	–	0
Cisco	0	–	7	–	0	0	–	9	–	0
Championship: NE Oklahoma A&M 28, Navarro 25
$ – Conference champion; † – Conference playoff participant; y – Championship game participant

1999 Southwest Junior College Football Conference standings
	Conf.					Overall
Team	W		L		T	W		L		T
Blinn †	6	–	1	–	0	9	–	2	–	0
Trinity Valley †y$	5	–	2	–	0	9	–	3	–	0
Navarro †y	5	–	2	–	0	8	–	3	–	0
NE Oklahoma A&M †	5	–	2	–	0	6	–	4	–	0
Tyler	3	–	4	–	0	5	–	5	–	0
Kilgore	3	–	4	–	0	4	–	4	–	0
Ranger	1	–	6	–	0	1	–	8	–	0
Cisco	0	–	7	–	0	1	–	8	–	0
Red River Bowl—championship: Trinity Valley 48, Blinn 8
$ – Conference champion; † – Conference playoff participant; y – Championship game participant

2000 Southwest Junior College Football Conference standings
	Conf.					Overall
Team	W		L		T	W		L		T
NE Oklahoma A&M †y	6	–	1	–	0	8	–	3	–	0
Navarro †	5	–	2	–	0	8	–	3	–	0
Tyler †y$	5	–	2	–	0	9	–	3	–	0
Trinity Valley †	4	–	3	–	0	5	–	6	–	0
Kilgore	4	–	3	–	0	6	–	4	–	0
Blinn	3	–	4	–	0	4	–	6	–	0
Cisco	1	–	6	–	0	2	–	8	–	0
Ranger	0	–	7	–	0	0	–	10	–	0
Red River Bowl—championship: Tyler 23, NE Oklahoma A&M 21
$ – Conference champion; † – Conference playoff participant; y – Championship game participant

2001 Southwest Junior College Football Conference standings
	Conf.					Overall
Team		W		L			W		L
Kilgore †y$	7	–	0	–	0	12	–	0	–	0
Tyler †y	5	–	2	–	0	8	–	4	–	0
Navarro †	5	–	2	–	0	6	–	6	–	0
NE Oklahoma A&M †	4	–	3	–	0	6	–	5	–	0
Blinn	3	–	4	–	0	4	–	5	–	0
Trinity Valley	3	–	4	–	0	4	–	5	–	0
Ranger	1	–	6	–	0	2	–	8	–	0
Cisco	0	–	7	–	0	1	–	9	–	0
Red River Bowl—championship: Kilgore 14, Tyler 7
$ – Conference champion; † – Conference playoff participant; y – Championship game participant

2002 Southwest Junior College Football Conference standings
	Conf.			Overall
Team	W		L	W		L
NE Oklahoma A&M †y$	5	–	1	11	–	1
Trinity Valley †y	5	–	1	10	–	2
Kilgore †	4	–	2	6	–	4
Navarro †	3	–	3	3	–	7
Tyler	2	–	4	5	–	4
Blinn	2	–	4	4	–	5
Cisco	0	–	6	2	–	8
Championship: NE Oklahoma A&M 14, Trinity Valley 7
$ – Conference champion; † – Conference playoff participant; y – Championship game participant

2003 Southwest Junior College Football Conference standings
	Conf.			Overall
Team	W		L	W		L
NE Oklahoma A&M †y$	5	–	1	10	–	2
Tyler †y	5	–	1	10	–	2
Blinn †	4	–	2	7	–	3
Kilgore †	4	–	2	6	–	4
Trinity Valley	1	–	5	3	–	6
Cisco	1	–	5	2	–	7
Navarro	1	–	5	1	–	8
SWJCFC championship: NE Oklahoma A&M 37, Tyler 34
$ – Conference champion; † – Conference playoff participant; y – Championship game participant

2004 Southwest Junior College Football Conference standings
	Conf.			Overall
Team	W		L	W		L
Kilgore †y$	6	–	0	10	–	2
Blinn †	5	–	1	9	–	2
Tyler †y	4	–	2	8	–	4
Navarro	2	–	4	4	–	5
NE Oklahoma A&M	2	–	4	4	–	5
Trinity Valley †	2	–	4	3	–	7
Cisco	0	–	6	2	–	7
Championship: Kilgore 21, Tyler 14
$ – Conference champion; † – Conference playoff participant; y – Championship game participant

2005 Southwest Junior College Football Conference standings
	Conf.			Overall
Team	W		L	W		L
NE Oklahoma A&M †y	4	–	2	9	–	3
Trinity Valley †y$	4	–	2	9	–	3
Blinn †	4	–	2	7	–	3
Cisco †	4	–	2	7	–	4
Tyler	2	–	4	4	–	5
Navarro	2	–	4	4	–	5
Kilgore	1	–	5	2	–	7
Championship: Trinity Valley 49, NE Oklahoma A&M 41
$ – Conference champion; † – Conference playoff participant; y – Championship game participant

2006 Southwest Junior College Football Conference standings
	Conf.			Overall
Team	W		L	W		L
Blinn †y$	6	–	0	12	–	0
Cisco †	3	–	3	6	–	4
Kilgore †y	3	–	3	6	–	6
NE Oklahoma A&M †	3	–	3	3	–	6
Navarro	2	–	4	5	–	4
Tyler	2	–	4	5	–	4
Trinity Valley	2	–	4	2	–	7
Championship: Blinn 20, Kilgore 14
$ – Conference champion; † – Conference playoff participant; y – Championship game participant; NE Oklahoma A&M forfeited 2 games due to an ineligible player.

2007 Southwest Junior College Football Conference standings
	Conf.			Overall
Team	W		L	W		L
Kilgore †y	5	–	1	8	–	4
Navarro †y$	4	–	2	9	–	3
Blinn †	4	–	2	7	–	3
Cisco †	4	–	2	7	–	3
Tyler	3	–	3	5	–	4
NE Oklahoma A&M	1	–	5	4	–	5
Trinity Valley	0	–	6	2	–	7
Championship: Navarro 54, Kilgore 28
$ – Conference champion; † – Conference playoff participant; y – Championship game participant; NE Oklahoma A&M forfeited 2 games due to an ineligble player.

2008 Southwest Junior College Football Conference standings
	Conf.			Overall
Team	W		L	W		L
Navarro †y	7	–	0	10	–	1
Blinn †y$	5	–	2	9	–	3
Kilgore †	5	–	2	6	–	4
Trinity Valley †	4	–	3	6	–	4
Tyler	4	–	3	5	–	4
NE Oklahoma A&M	2	–	5	3	–	6
Cisco	1	–	6	2	–	7
Championship: Blinn 49, Navarro 24
$ – Conference champion; † – Conference playoff participant; y – Championship game participant

2014 Southwest Junior College Football Conference standings
	Conf.			Overall
Team	W		L	W		L
Trinity Valley †y$	6	–	0	12	–	0
Tyler †y	4	–	2	8	–	3
Kilgore †	4	–	2	7	–	3
Navarro †	4	–	2	7	–	3
Blinn	2	–	4	4	–	4
NE Oklahoma A&M	1	–	5	5	–	6
Cisco	0	–	6	1	–	6
Championship: Trinity Valley 73, Tyler 46
$ – Conference champion; † – Conference playoff participant; y – Championship game participant

2015 Southwest Junior College Football Conference standings
	Conf.			Overall
Team	W		L	W		L
Trinity Valley †	5	–	1	7	–	3
No. 16 Tyler †	4	–	2	7	–	3
Navarro †y	4	–	2	7	–	4
Kilgore †y$	3	–	3	7	–	5
Blinn	2	–	4	5	–	4
NE Oklahoma A&M	2	–	4	4	–	5
Cisco	1	–	5	3	–	5
Championship: Kilgore 42, Navarro 28
$ – Conference champion; † – Conference playoff participant; y – Championship game participant; Rankings from NJCAA poll

2016 Southwest Junior College Football Conference standings
	Conf.			Overall
Team	W		L	W		L
No. 4 Trinity Valley †y$	6	–	1	11	–	1
No. 9 Navarro	4	–	3	6	–	3
Tyler †	4	–	3	5	–	4
No. 11 Kilgore †y	4	–	3	6	–	5
NE Oklahoma A&M †	4	–	3	5	–	5
Blinn	3	–	4	5	–	4
New Mexico Military	3	–	4	5	–	4
Cisco	0	–	7	0	–	9
Championship: Trinity Valley 54, Kilgore 41
$ – Conference champion; † – Conference playoff participant; y – Championship game participant; Rankings from NJCAA poll

2017 Southwest Junior College Football Conference standings
	Conf.			Overall
Team	W		L	W		L
No. 8 NE Oklahoma A&M †y$	5	–	2	9	–	3
No. 6 Trinity Valley †y	5	–	2	9	–	3
No. 12 Blinn †	5	–	2	6	–	4
No. 17 Navarro †	4	–	3	6	–	4
Kilgore	4	–	3	5	–	4
Tyler	3	–	4	4	–	5
New Mexico Military	1	–	6	3	–	6
Cisco	1	–	6	2	–	8
Championship: NE Oklahoma A&M 26, Trinity Valley 10
$ – Conference champion; † – Conference playoff participant; y – Championship game participant; Rankings from NJCAA poll

2018 Southwest Junior College Football Conference standings
	Conf.			Overall
Team	W		L	W		L
No. 4 Kilgore †y$	5	–	2	10	–	2
No. 14 NE Oklahoma A&M †y	5	–	2	8	–	4
No. 15 Blinn †	4	–	3	7	–	4
Navarro †	4	–	3	6	–	5
Cisco	3	–	4	5	–	4
Trinity Valley	3	–	4	4	–	5
Tyler	3	–	4	4	–	5
New Mexico Military	1	–	6	3	–	6
Championship: Kilgore 62, Northeastern Oklahoma A&M 19
$ – Conference champion; † – Conference playoff participant; y – Championship game participant; Rankings from NJCAA poll

2019 Southwest Junior College Football Conference standings
	Conf.			Overall
Team	W		L	W		L
No. 7 Kilgore †	6	–	2	8	–	2
No. 16 Trinity Valley †	5	–	3	7	–	4
No. 17 Navarro †y$	4	–	4	6	–	5
New Mexico Military †y	4	–	4	6	–	5
Cisco	3	–	4	5	–	4
Northeastern Oklahoma A&M	3	–	4	4	–	5
Tyler	3	–	4	4	–	5
Blinn	2	–	5	4	–	5
Championship: Navarro 36, New Mexico Military 35
$ – Conference champion; † – Conference playoff participant; y – Championship game participant; Rankings from NJCAA poll

2020–21 Southwest Junior College Football Conference standings
	Conf.			Overall
Team	W		L	W		L
No. 3 Cisco $	7	–	0	7	–	0
No. 6 Kilgore	6	–	1	7	–	1
No. 8 Trinity Valley	5	–	2	6	–	2
No. 9 New Mexico Military	4	–	3	5	–	4
Navarro	3	–	4	3	–	4
Tyler	2	–	5	4	–	5
Northeastern Oklahoma A&M	1	–	6	1	–	7
Blinn	0	–	7	1	–	7
$ – Conference champion; Rankings from NJCAA poll

2021 Southwest Junior College Football Conference standings
	Conf.			Overall
Team	W		L	W		L
No. 1 New Mexico Military †y$^	6	–	1	12	–	1
No. 12 Tyler †y	5	–	3	7	–	5
Kilgore †	4	–	4	5	–	5
Trinity Valley	3	–	4	5	–	4
Blinn †	3	–	4	5	–	5
Navarro	3	–	4	5	–	5
Cisco	3	–	4	4	–	5
Northeastern Oklahoma A&M	2	–	4	4	–	5
Championship: New Mexico Military 45, Tyler 10
$ – Conference champion; † – Conference playoff participant; y – Championship game participant; ^ – NJCAA Division I playoff participant

2022 Southwest Junior College Football Conference standings
	Conf.			Overall
Team	W		L	W		L
No. 14 Trinity Valley †	7	–	0	8	–	3
No. 7 New Mexico Military †y	5	–	2	9	–	3
No. 15 Navarro †	5	–	2	6	–	4
No. 11 Kilgore †y$	4	–	3	8	–	4
Tyler	4	–	3	5	–	4
Blinn	1	–	6	3	–	6
Cisco	1	–	6	3	–	6
Northeastern Oklahoma A&M	1	–	6	3	–	6
Championship: Kilgore 39, New Mexico Military 12
$ – Conference champion; † – Conference playoff participant; y – Championship game participant; Rankings from NJCAA Division I poll

2023 Southwest Junior College Football Conference standings
	Conf.			Overall
Team	W		L	W		L
No. 5 Kilgore †y$^	7	–	1	9	–	2
No. 10 Trinity Valley †	5	–	2	7	–	3
No. 12 Navarro †y	5	–	3	6	–	5
Tyler	4	–	3	5	–	4
New Mexico Military †	4	–	3	6	–	6
Cisco	3	–	4	4	–	4
Blinn	1	–	6	3	–	6
Northeastern Oklahoma A&M	0	–	7	0	–	9
Championship: Kilgore 48, Navarro 39
$ – Conference champion; † – Conference playoff participant; y – Championship game participant; ^ – NJCAA Division I playoff participant; Rankings from NJCAA Division I poll

2024 Southwest Junior College Football Conference standings
	Conf.			Overall
Team	W		L	W		L
No. 5 Navarro †y$^	7	–	2	9	–	2
No. 7 Tyler †y	7	–	2	7	–	4
Kilgore †	4	–	4	6	–	4
Cisco †	4	–	4	4	–	5
Trinity Valley	3	–	4	5	–	4
Blinn	2	–	5	4	–	5
Northeastern Oklahoma A&M	2	–	5	3	–	6
New Mexico Military	2	–	5	3	–	6
Championship: Navarro 31, Tyler 28
$ – Conference champion; † – Conference playoff participant; y – Championship game participant; ^ – NJCAA Division I playoff participant; Rankings from NJCAA Division I poll

2025 Southwest Junior College Football Conference standings
	Conf.			Overall
Team	W		L	W		L
No. 3 Tyler †y$^	7	–	0	11	–	1
No. 13 Northeastern Oklahoma A&M †y	5	–	2	6	–	5
No. 11 Trinity Valley †	5	–	2	7	–	3
Cisco †	4	–	3	5	–	4
Blinn	2	–	5	4	–	5
New Mexico Military	2	–	5	3	–	6
Navarro	2	–	5	2	–	6
Kilgore	1	–	6	3	–	6
Championship: Tyler 33, Northeastern Oklahoma A&M 14
$ – Conference champion; † – Conference playoff participant; y – Championship game participant; ^ – NJCAA Division I playoff participant; Rankings from NJCAA Division I poll
