= Navarro College =

Community college in Corsicana, Texas, US

Coordinates: 32.0761°N 96.4987°W

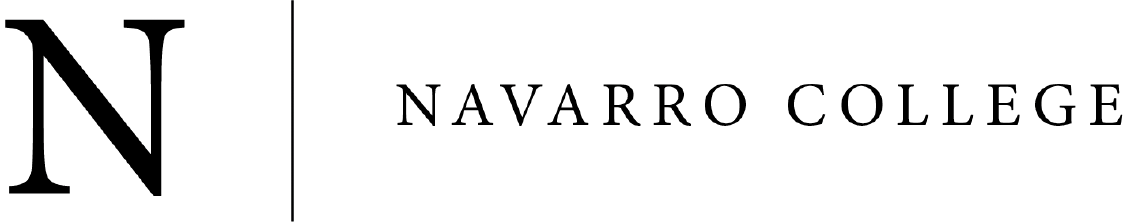
- Former name: Navarro Junior College (1946–1974)
- Type: Public community college
- Established: 1946
- District President: Kevin Fegan
- Students: 10,000+
- Location: Corsicana, Texas, U.S.
- Sporting affiliations: NJCAA – Southwest
- Mascot: Bulldogs
- Website: www.navarrocollege.edu

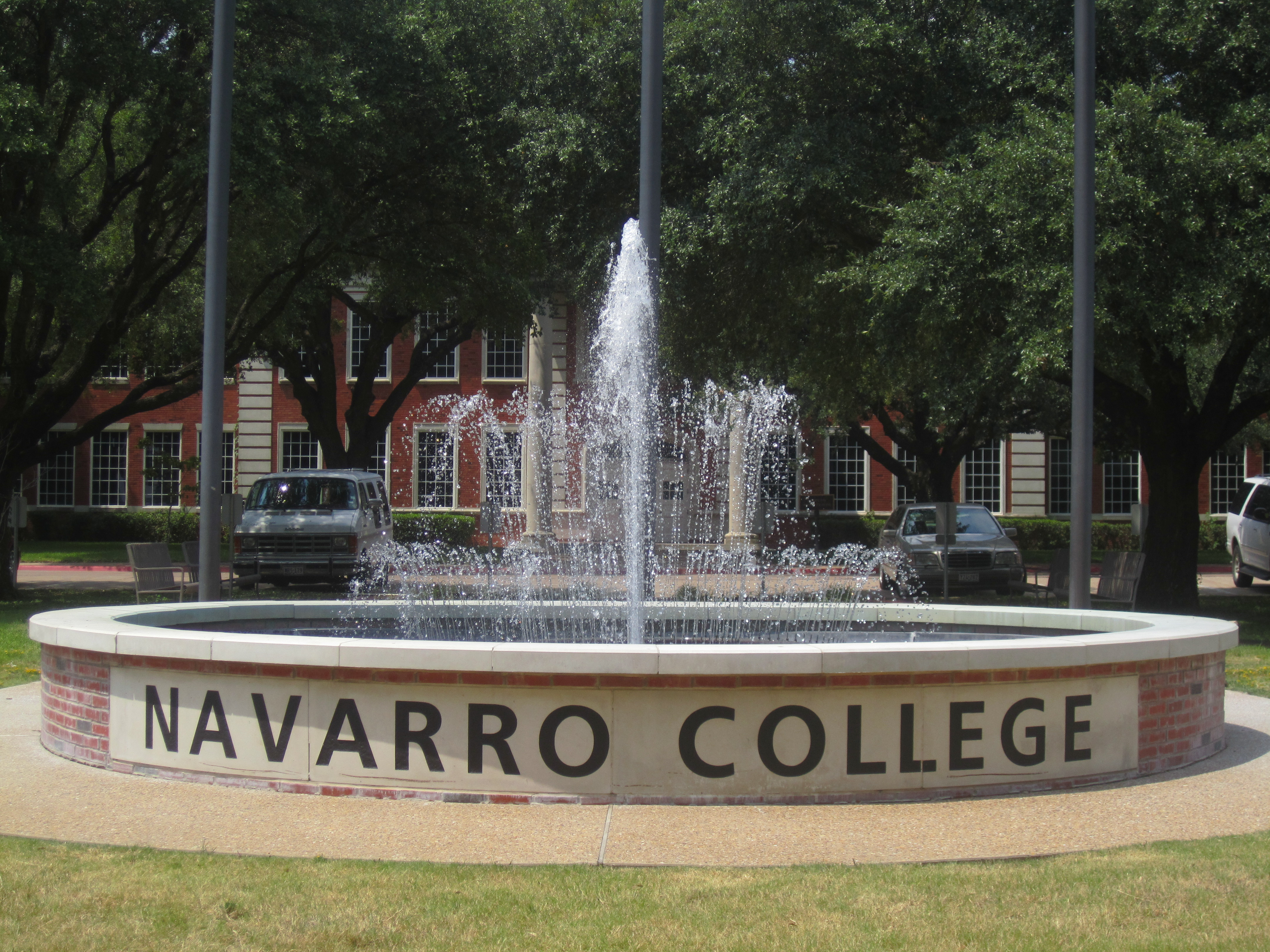
Navarro College sign off of Texas State Highway 31

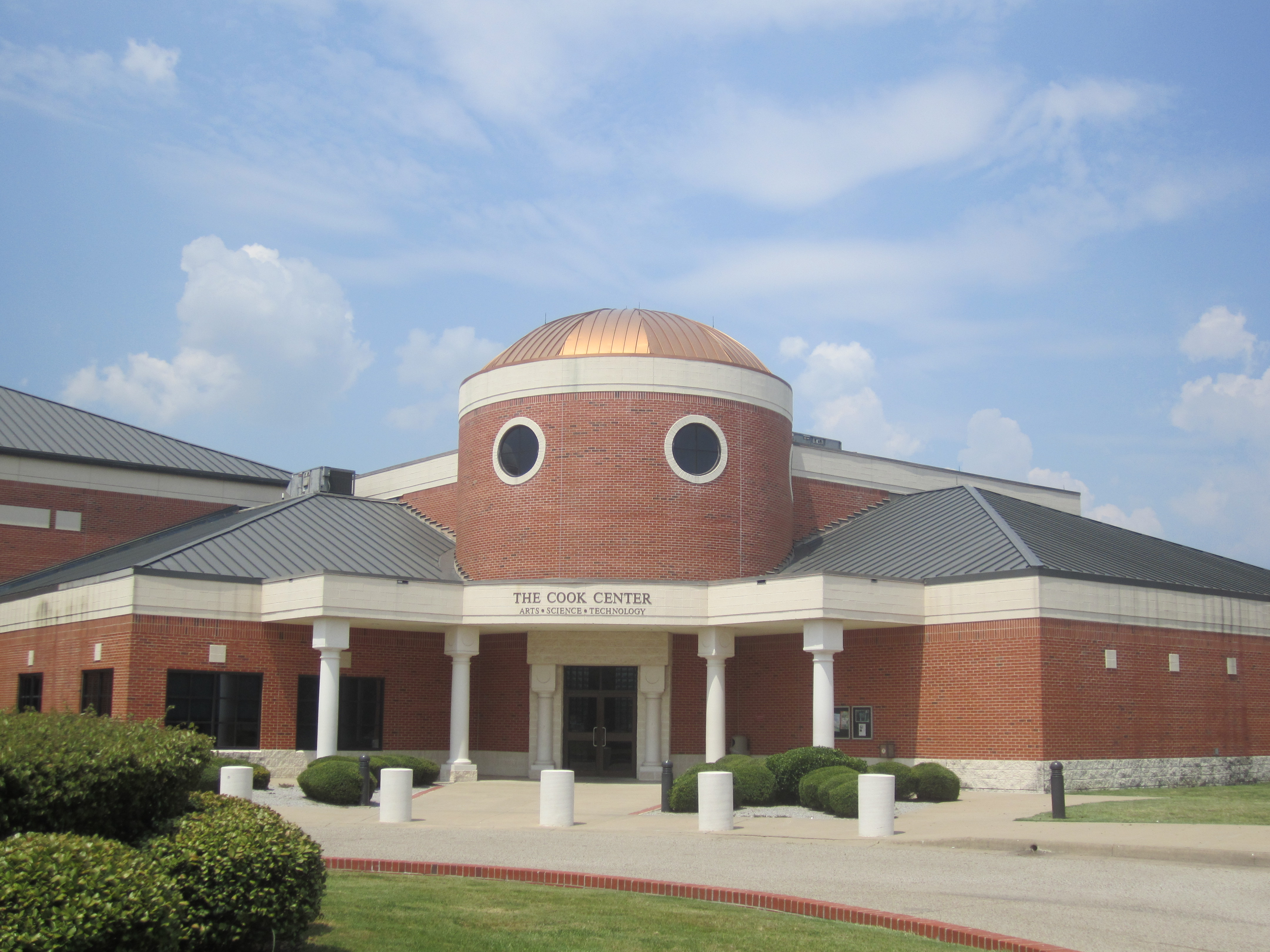
Cook Center—Arts, Sciences, Technology—at Navarro College houses the largest planetarium in Texas.

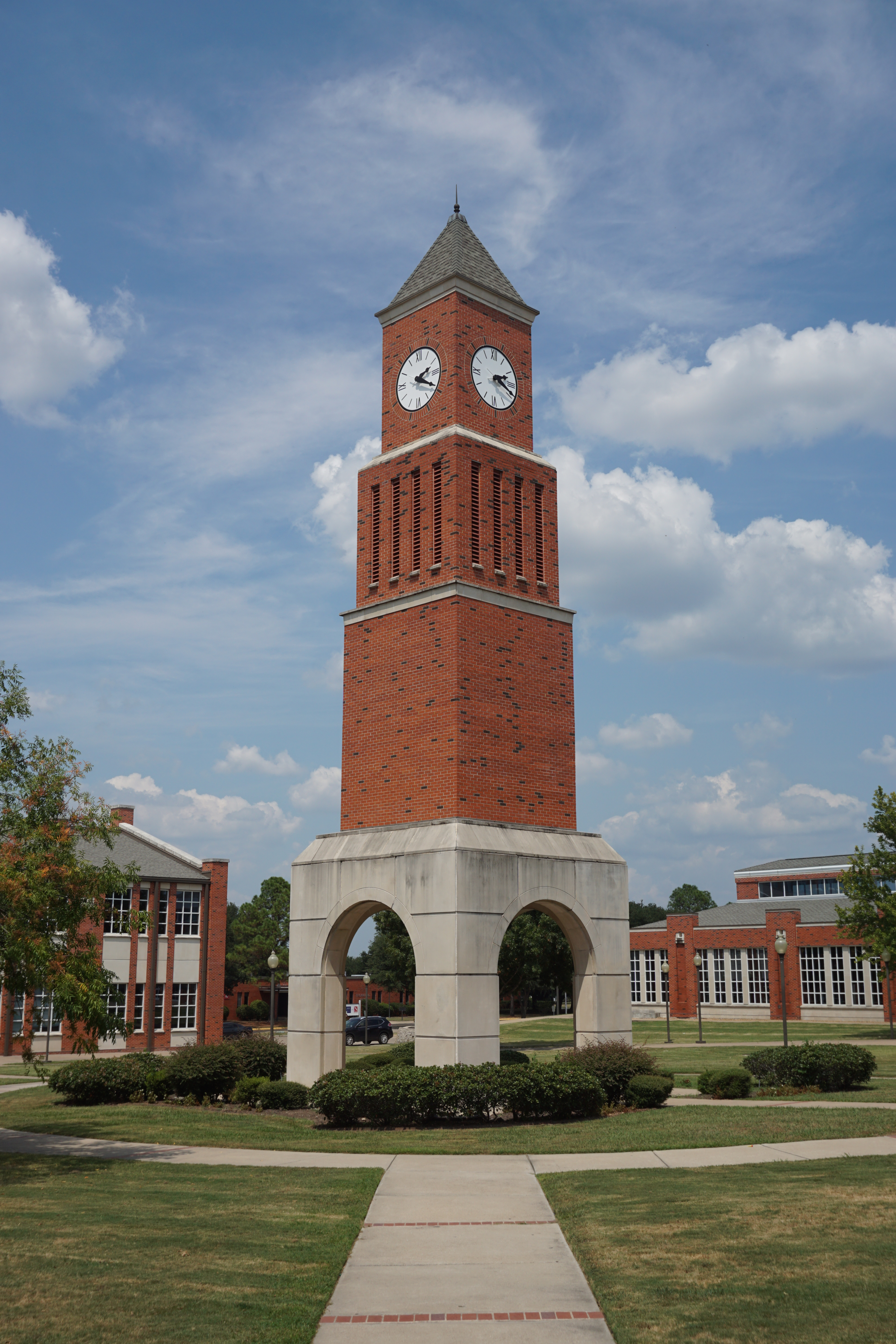
Barracks Bunch Clock Tower

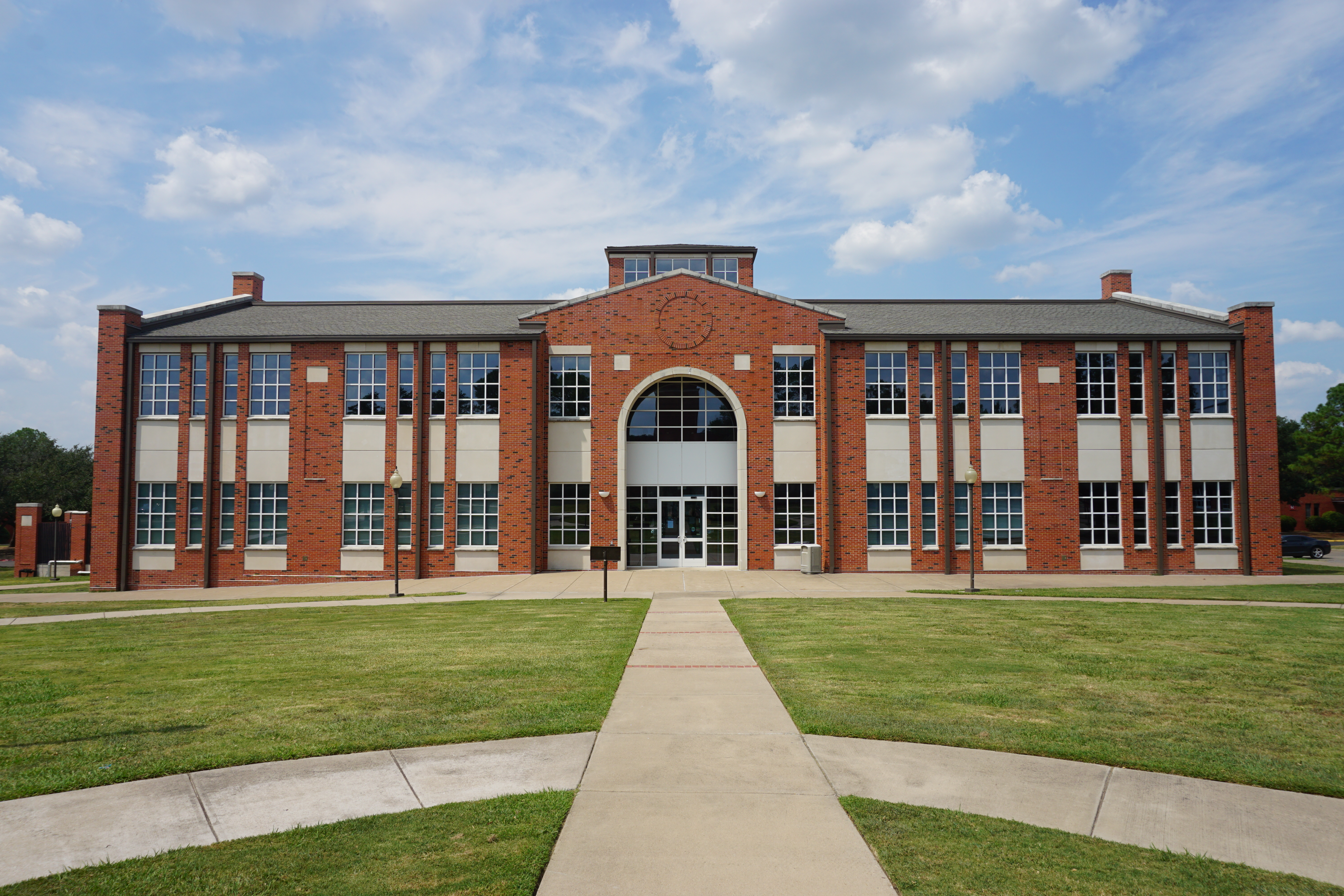
Richard M. Sanchez Library

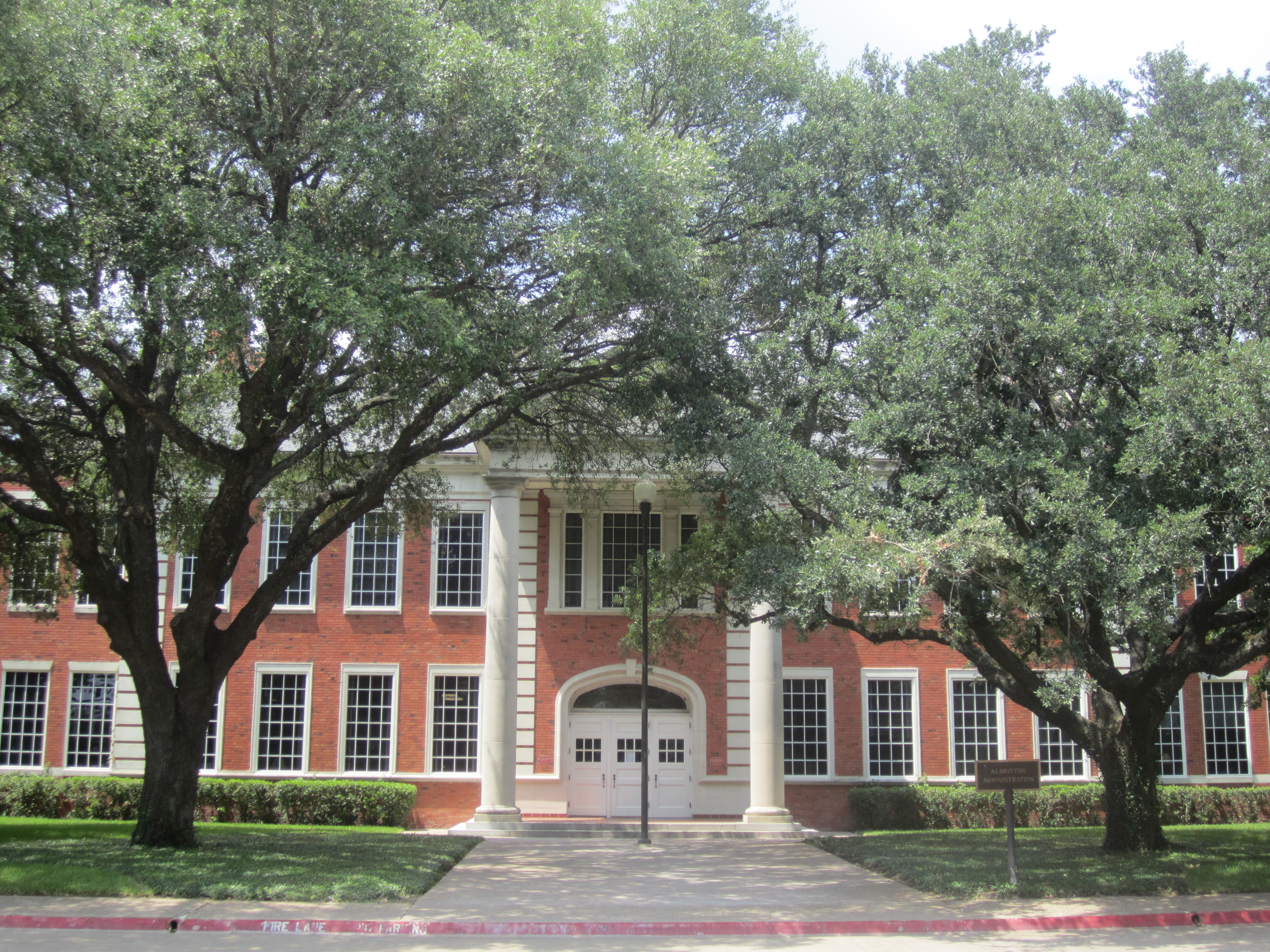
Albritton Administration Building

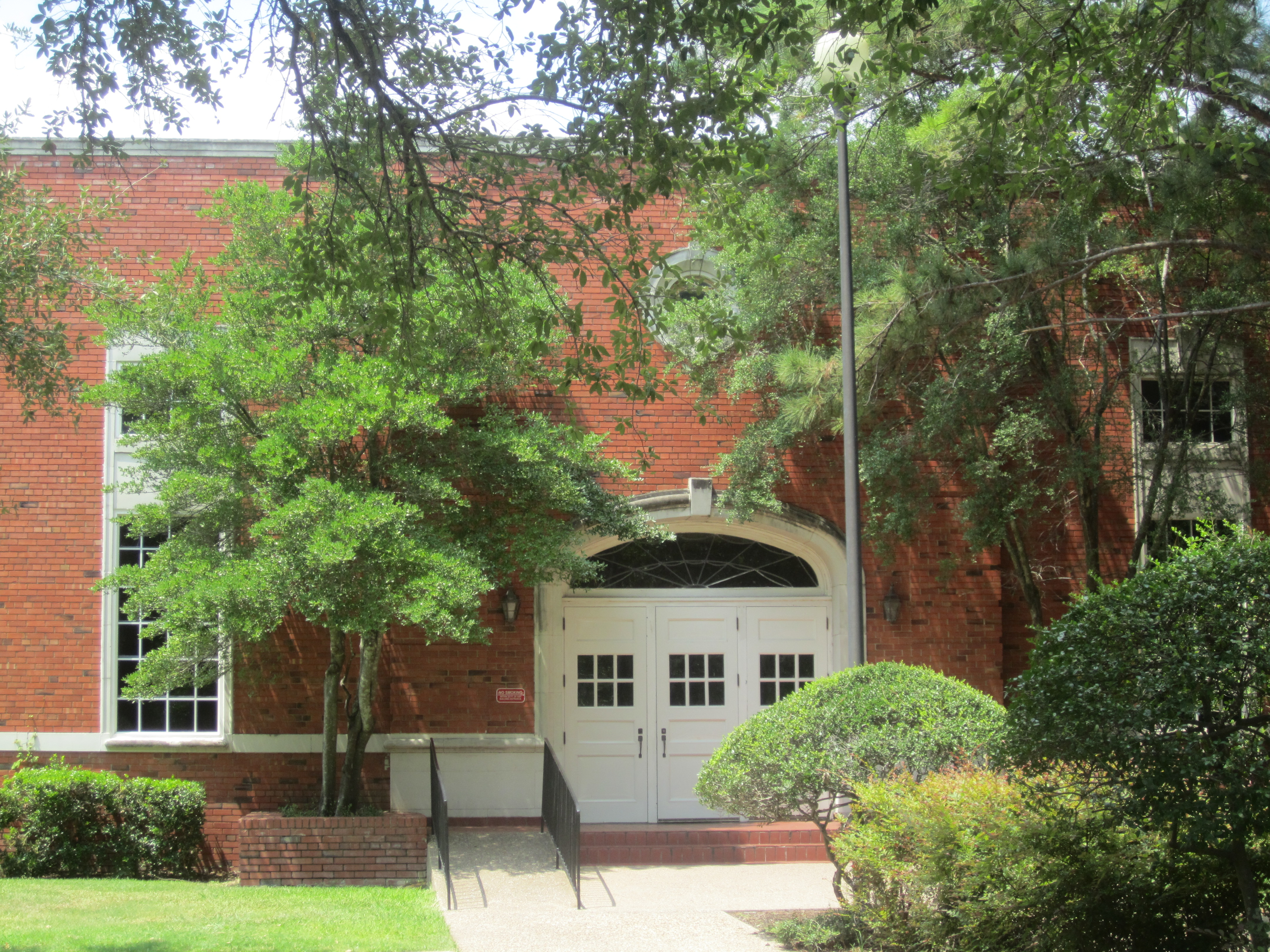
Navarro College theater

Navarro College is a public community college in Texas with its main campus in Corsicana and branches in Mexia, Midlothian, and Waxahachie. The college has an annual student enrollment of more than 9,000 students.

The Corsicana campus has strong ties with Texas A&M University–Commerce which has branches at the Navarro College campuses in Corsicana.

== History ==
In spring 1946, a group of local citizens met to form a steering committee for the purpose of establishing a junior college in Navarro County. In a general election held July 16, 1946, voters approved the creation of Navarro Junior College and authorized a county tax to help finance the institution. In that same election, voters chose a seven-member board of trustees to govern the college. The first students began classes in September 1946. Most of the 238 members of that first student body were returning veterans from World War II taking advantage of assistance available under the newly enacted GI Bill of Rights. The first campus of Navarro College was the site of the Air Activities of Texas, a World War II primary flight school located six miles (10 km) south of Corsicana.

In 1951, the campus was moved to its present location, a 47-acre (19 ha) tract west of downtown Corsicana on Texas State Highway 31.

In 1974, the college broadened its philosophy and purpose to encompass the comprehensive community-based educational concept, adding occupational education programs and implementing new education concepts including individualized and self-paced instruction and the use of audio-tutorial instructional media. In keeping with the new educational role, the word "junior" was dropped from the institution's name, and the official name Navarro College was adopted by the board of trustees. In an attempt to address the growing needs of its service area, which consists of Navarro, Ellis, Freestone, Limestone, and Leon counties, the college began offering courses in various locations in those areas in the early 1970s and eventually established two permanent centers, Navarro College South at Mexia and the Ellis County Center at Waxahachie. Later, a third and fourth off-campus centers were added in Midlothian and Fairfield.

=== 2014 Ebola controversy ===
In October 2014, Navarro College received criticism for sending admission rejection letters to two prospective students from Nigeria because the college was "not accepting international students from countries with confirmed Ebola cases." Nigeria was identified by the World Health Organization through the summer of 2014 with multiple confirmed cases of Ebola, but there had been no new Ebola cases (since early September). The rejected applicants lived in Ibadan, Nigeria, approximately 80 miles from Lagos, where the most recent infected cases were identified. The college offered an explanation on October 13, stating that the rejections were not a result of fears of Ebola, but that its international department had recently been restructured to focus on recruiting students from China and Indonesia. On October 16, college Vice-president Dewayne Gragg issued a new statement, contradicting the previous explanation and confirming that there had indeed been a decision to "postpone our recruitment in those nations that the Center for Disease Control and the U.S. State Department have identified as at risk."

== Campus ==
The Corsicana campus has expanded to 103 acres (42 ha) with 23 buildings. It is home to the Cook Education Center, which houses a 60-foot-diameter (18 m) dome planetarium with seating for more than two hundred, tied with the University of Texas at Arlington for the largest planetarium in Texas. The Cook Education Center also contains the Pearce Collections Museum, home to many American Civil War artifacts as well as a western art collection.

== Organization and administration ==
As defined by the Texas Legislature, the official service area of Navarro College includes all of Ellis, Freestone, Leon, Limestone, and Navarro counties.

== Academics ==
Navarro is accredited by the Southern Association of Colleges and Schools. The accreditation was given in 1954 and reaffirmed in 1964, 1974, 1985, 1995 and again in 2006.

Waxahachie Global High School is partnered with Navarro College, and set up in a way that students at Global can take classes at Navarro. Thus they can graduate from high school with an associate degree or transferable credits to a 4-year university along with their high school diploma.

== Athletics ==
Navarro's athletics teams, nicknamed the Bulldogs, compete in the Southwest Junior College Conference of the NJCAA. Navarro offers athletic scholarships in the following sports for men: football, basketball, baseball and for women: soccer, softball, volleyball. In 2011, the baseball team won the NJCAA Junior College World Series in Grand Junction, Colorado. The Bulldogs beat Central Arizona College, 6–4, on J.T. Files's walk-off home run in the tenth inning.

- Perry D. "Peno" Graham Field (baseball)

=== Cheerleading ===
The Bulldogs also have a strong reputation for their coed cheer team. Since the year 2000, Coach Monica Aldama has led the program to 16 NCA National Championships in the junior college division, as well as six "Grand National" designations (a status awarded to the team with the highest overall score in competition). In 2020, the squad became the subject of a Netflix docuseries called Cheer.

== Notable people ==
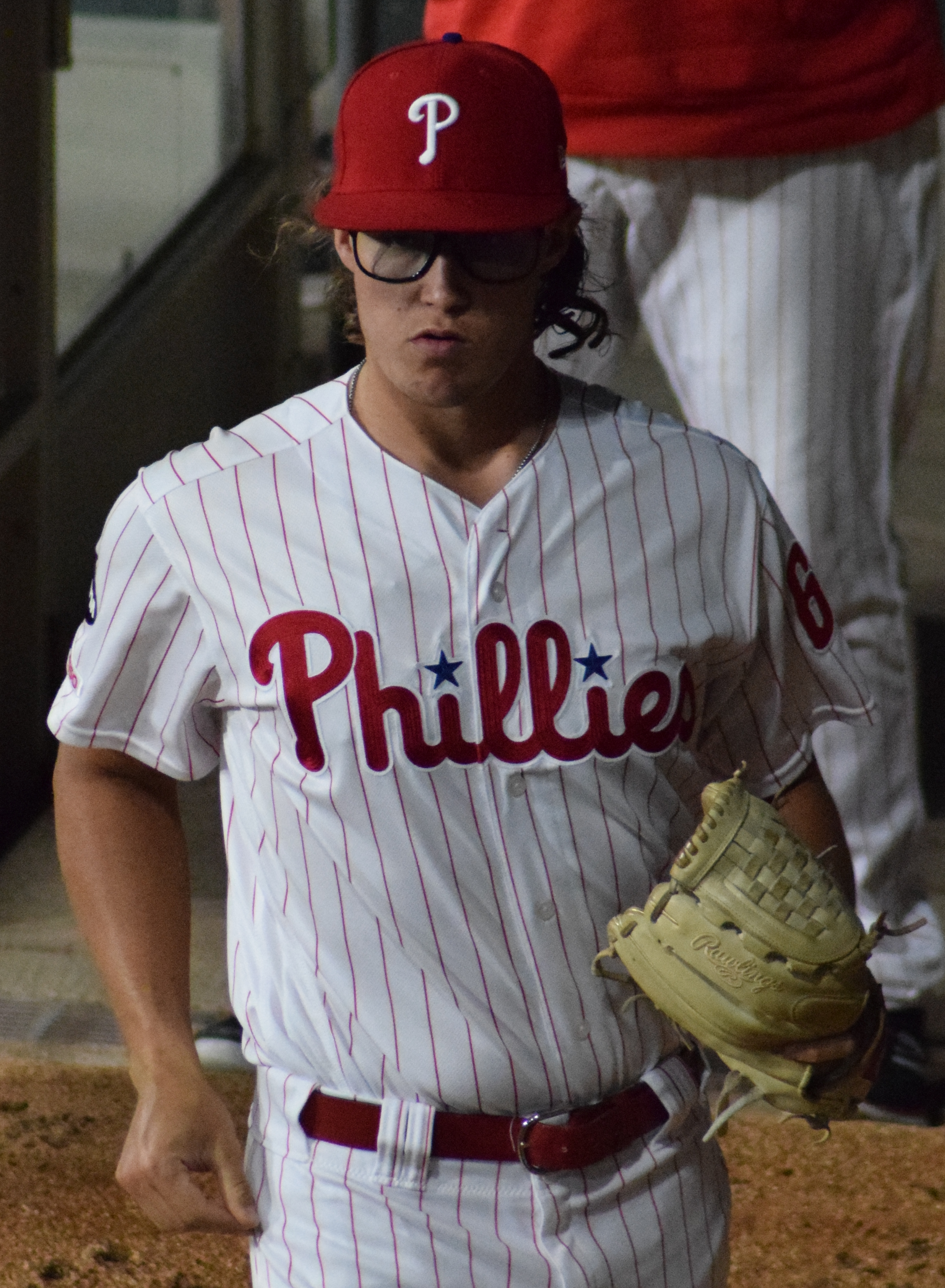
JD Hammer

- Willis Adams, NFL player
- Eddie Brown, NFL player
- Keith Burns, NFL player
- Gabi Butler, Navarro College cheerleader signed to WWE
- Keo Coleman, professional football player
- Byron Cook, professional politician
- Chris Davis, professional baseball player
- Wasila Diwura-Soale, Ghanaian soccer player
- DeMarcus Faggins, professional football player
- Al Fontenot, professional football player
- Cameron Giles, hip hop artist Cam'ron
- Aaron Glenn, professional football coach
- JD Hammer (born 1994), professional baseball player
- Jerry Harris, former Navarro College cheerleader, sex offender
- Brock Holt, professional baseball player
- Ray Jacobs, professional football player
- Durwood Keeton, professional football player
- Jermane Mayberry, professional football player
- Stockar McDougle, professional football player
- Louis Moore, professional football player
- Tano Tijerina, professional baseball player and judge
- Pat Williams, professional football player
- J'Marcus Webb, professional football player
- Mark Wheeler, professional football player
- Buzz Williams, college basketball coach
