= List of college athletic programs in Minnesota =

This is a list of college athletic programs in the U.S. state of Minnesota.

== NCAA ==
=== Division I ===
Full NCAA Division I member colleges in Minnesota.
– FBS Football, – FCS Football

Team	School	City	Conference	Sport sponsorship								
Team	School	City	Conference	Foot- ball	Basketball		Base- ball	Soft- ball	Ice hockey		Soccer	
Team	School	City	Conference	Foot- ball	M	W	Base- ball	Soft- ball	M	W	M	W
Minnesota Golden Gophers	University of Minnesota Twin Cities	Minneapolis	Big Ten	FBS	Yes	Yes	Yes	Yes	Yes	Yes (Note: Minnesota's women's ice hockey team competes in the Western Collegiate Hockey Association.)	No	Yes
St. Thomas Tommies	University of St. Thomas	Saint Paul	Summit	FCS (Note: St. Thomas's football team competes in the Pioneer Football League.)	Yes	Yes	Yes	Yes	Yes (Note: St. Thomas's men's and women's ice hockey teams respectively compete in the Central Collegiate Hockey Association and the Western Collegiate Hockey Association.)	Yes	Yes	Yes

=== Division II ===
Full NCAA Division II member colleges in Minnesota.
– Football, – Non-Football

Team	School	City	Conference	Sport sponsorship								
Team	School	City	Conference	Foot- ball	Basketball		Base- ball	Soft- ball	Ice hockey		Soccer	
Team	School	City	Conference	Foot- ball	M	W	Base- ball	Soft- ball	M	W	M	W
Bemidji State Beavers	Bemidji State University	Bemidji	Northern Sun	Yes	Yes	Yes	Yes	Yes	Yes (Note: Bemidji State and Minnesota State's men's ice hockey teams compete in Division I as members of the Central Collegiate Hockey Association.)	Yes (Note: Bemidji State, Minnesota–Duluth, Minnesota State, and St. Cloud State's women's ice hockey teams all compete in Division I as members of the Western Collegiate Hockey Association.)	No	Yes
Concordia Golden Bears	Concordia University, Saint Paul	Saint Paul	Northern Sun	Yes	Yes	Yes	Yes	Yes	No	No	No	Yes
Minnesota–Crookston Golden Eagles	University of Minnesota Crookston	Crookston	Northern Sun	No	Yes	Yes	Yes	Yes	No	No	No	Yes
Minnesota–Duluth Bulldogs	University of Minnesota Duluth	Duluth	Northern Sun	Yes	Yes	Yes	Yes	Yes	Yes (Note: Minnesota–Duluth and St. Cloud State's men's ice hockey teams compete in Division I as members of the National Collegiate Hockey Conference.)	Yes	No	Yes
Minnesota State Mavericks	Minnesota State University, Mankato	Mankato	Northern Sun	Yes	Yes	Yes	Yes	Yes	Yes	Yes	No	Yes
MSU Moorhead Dragons	Minnesota State University Moorhead	Moorhead	Northern Sun	Yes	Yes	Yes	No	Yes	No	No	No	Yes
Southwest Minnesota State Mustangs	Southwest Minnesota State University	Marshall	Northern Sun	Yes	Yes	Yes	Yes	Yes	No	No	No	Yes
St. Cloud State Huskies	St. Cloud State University	St. Cloud	Northern Sun	No	Yes	Yes	Yes	Yes	Yes	Yes	Yes (Note: St. Cloud State's men's soccer team competes in the Great Lakes Intercollegiate Athletic Conference.)	Yes
Winona State Warriors	Winona State University	Winona	Northern Sun	Yes	Yes	Yes	Yes	Yes	No	No	No	Yes

=== Division III ===
Team	School	City	Conference	Sport sponsorship								
Team	School	City	Conference	Foot- ball	Basketball		Base- ball	Soft- ball	Ice hockey		Soccer	
Team	School	City	Conference	Foot- ball	M	W	Base- ball	Soft- ball	M	W	M	W
Augsburg Auggies	Augsburg University	Minneapolis	Minnesota	Yes	Yes	Yes	Yes	Yes	Yes	Yes	Yes	Yes
Bethany Lutheran Vikings	Bethany Lutheran College	Mankato	Upper Midwest	No	Yes	Yes	Yes	Yes	No	No	Yes	Yes
Bethel Royals	Bethel University	Arden Hills	Minnesota	Yes	Yes	Yes	Yes	Yes	Yes	Yes	Yes	Yes
Carleton Knights	Carleton College	Northfield	Minnesota	Yes	Yes	Yes	Yes	Yes	No	No	Yes	Yes
Concordia Cobbers	Concordia College, Moorhead	Moorhead	Minnesota	Yes	Yes	Yes	Yes	Yes	Yes	Yes	Yes	Yes
Crown Polars	Crown College	St. Bonifacius	Upper Midwest	Yes	Yes	Yes	Yes	Yes	No	No	Yes	Yes
Gustavus Adolphus Golden Gusties	Gustavus Adolphus College	St. Peter	Minnesota	Yes	Yes	Yes	Yes	Yes	Yes	Yes	Yes	Yes
Hamline Pipers	Hamline University	St. Paul	Minnesota	Yes	Yes	Yes	Yes	Yes	Yes	Yes	Yes	Yes
Macalester Scots	Macalester College	St. Paul	Minnesota	Yes	Yes	Yes	Yes	Yes	No	No	Yes	Yes
Martin Luther Knights	Martin Luther College	New Ulm	Upper Midwest	Yes	Yes	Yes	Yes	Yes	No	No	Yes	Yes
Minnesota–Morris Cougars	University of Minnesota Morris	Morris	Upper Midwest	Yes	Yes	Yes	Yes	Yes	No	No	Yes	Yes
North Central Rams	North Central University	Minneapolis	Upper Midwest	No	Yes	Yes	Yes	Yes	No	No	Yes	Yes
Northwestern Eagles	University of Northwestern – St. Paul	Roseville	Upper Midwest	Yes	Yes	Yes	Yes	Yes	No	No	Yes	Yes
Saint Benedict Bennies	College of Saint Benedict	St. Joseph	Minnesota	No	No	Yes	No	Yes	No	Yes	No	Yes
St. Catherine Wildcats	St. Catherine University	St. Paul	Minnesota	No	No	Yes	No	Yes	No	Yes	No	Yes
Saint John's Johnnies	Saint John's University	Collegeville	Minnesota	Yes	Yes	No	Yes	No	Yes	No	Yes	No
Saint Mary's Cardinals	Saint Mary's University of Minnesota	Winona	Minnesota	No	Yes	Yes	Yes	Yes	Yes	Yes	Yes	Yes
St. Olaf Oles	St. Olaf College	Northfield	Minnesota	Yes	Yes	Yes	Yes	Yes	Yes	Yes	Yes	Yes
St. Scholastica Saints	College of St. Scholastica	Duluth	Minnesota	Yes	Yes	Yes	Yes	Yes	Yes	Yes	Yes	Yes

== NJCAA ==
Team	School	City	Conference
Anoka-Ramsey Rams	Anoka-Ramsey Community College	Coon Rapids	Minnesota CC
Central Lakes Raiders	Central Lakes College	Brainerd	Minnesota CC
Hibbing Cardinals	Hibbing Community College	Hibbing	Minnesota CC
Itasca Vikings	Itasca Community College	Grand Rapids	Minnesota CC
Mesabi Range Norse	Minnesota North College–Mesabi Range Virginia	Virginia	Minnesota CC
Minnesota CTC Spartans	Minnesota State Community & Technical College	Fergus Falls	Minnesota CC
Minnesota West Bluejays	Minnesota West Community & Technical College	Worthington	Minnesota CC
Northland Pioneers	Northland Community & Technical College	Thief River Falls	Minnesota CC
Rainy River Voyageurs	Rainy River Community College	International Falls	Minnesota CC
Ridgewater Warriors	Ridgewater College	Willmar	Minnesota CC
Riverland Blue Devils	Riverland Community College	Austin	Minnesota CC
Rochester Yellowjackets	Rochester Community & Technical College	Rochester	Minnesota CC
St. Cloud Tech Cyclones	St. Cloud Technical and Community College	St. Cloud	Minnesota CC
Vermillion Ironmen	Vermilion Community College	Ely	Minnesota CC

== ACCA ==
Team	School	City	Conference
FLBCS Conquerors	Free Lutheran Bible College and Seminary	Plymouth	Northern Intercollegiate
Oak Hills Christian Wolfpack	Oak Hills Christian College	Bemidji	Northern Intercollegiate

== See also ==
- List of NCAA Division I institutions
- List of NCAA Division II institutions
- List of NCAA Division III institutions
- List of NAIA institutions
- List of USCAA institutions
- List of NCCAA institutions
- List of NJCAA Division I institutions
- List of NJCAA Division II institutions
- List of NJCAA Division III institutions
