= 2015 junior college football season =

American junior college football season

- National Championship: Biloxi Indian Stadium, Biloxi, MS, (NJCAA); George M. Rush Stadium, San Francisco, CA, (CCCAA)
- Champion(s): Northwest Mississippi (NJCAA); CC of San Francisco (CCCAA)

The 2015 junior college football season was the season of intercollegiate junior college football running from September to December 2015. The season ended with two national champions: one from the National Junior College Athletic Association and one from the California Community College Athletic Association (CCCAA).

The NJCAA champion was Northwest Mississippi who defeated Rochester C&T 66–13 in the NJCAA National Football Championship. The CCCAA champion was CC of San Francisco who defeated Saddleback 26–14 in the CCCAA State Championship.

== Conference standings ==
=== NJCAA ===
2015 Iowa Community College Athletic Conference football standings
	Conf.			Overall
Team	W		L	W		L
No. 3 Iowa Western $	2	–	0	10	–	2
No. 18 Ellsworth	1	–	1	7	–	5
Iowa Central	0	–	2	2	–	8
$ – Conference champion; Rankings from NJCAA poll

2015 Kansas Jayhawk Community College Conference football standings
	Conf.			Overall
Team	W		L	W		L
No. 5 Butler (KS) +	6	–	1	9	–	2
No. 11 Dodge City +	7	–	1	9	–	3
No. 14 Coffeyville	4	–	3	8	–	3
Highland (KS)	4	–	3	5	–	5
Hutchinson	3	–	4	5	–	6
Garden City	2	–	5	3	–	8
Independence	2	–	5	2	–	8
Fort Scott	1	–	6	2	–	8
+ – Conference co-champions

2015 Minnesota College Athletic Conference football standings
	Conf.			Overall
Team	W		L	W		L
Eastern Division
No. 6 Rochester C&T xy$	5	–	0	11	–	1
No. 17 Central Lakes	4	–	1	8	–	3
Itasca	2	–	3	5	–	4
Fond du Lac	2	–	3	4	–	5
Mesabi Range	1	–	4	2	–	6
Vermilion	1	–	4	1	–	7
Western Division
No. 13 NDSCS xy	5	–	0	8	–	3
Dakota College	3	–	2	6	–	4
Ridgewater	3	–	2	4	–	5
Minnesota West C&T	2	–	3	2	–	7
Northland (MN)	1	–	4	2	–	6
Minnesota State C&T	0	–	5	1	–	7
Championship: Rochester C&T 45, NDSCS 41
$ – Conference champion; x – Division champion/co-champions; y – Championship game participant; Rankings from NJCAA poll

2015 Mississippi Association of Community and Junior Colleges football standings
	Conf.			Overall
Team	W		L	W		L
North Division
No. 7 East Mississippi x†	6	–	0	8	–	1
No. 1 Northwest Mississippi †y$^	5	–	1	11	–	1
Itawamba †	4	–	2	5	–	5
Holmes	3	–	3	4	–	5
Mississippi Delta	2	–	4	2	–	7
Northeast Mississippi	1	–	5	2	–	7
Coahoma	0	–	6	0	–	9
South Division
No. 8 Mississippi Gulf Coast x†y	5	–	1	8	–	3
No. 4 Copiah–Lincoln †	4	–	2	7	–	2
No. 10 East Central (MS) †	4	–	2	8	–	3
Hinds	4	–	2	6	–	3
Jones County	2	–	4	2	–	7
Southwest Mississippi	1	–	5	3	–	6
Pearl River	1	–	5	2	–	7
Championship: Northwest Mississippi 34, Mississippi Gulf Coast 24
$ – Conference champion; x – Division champion/co-champions; † – Conference playoff participant; y – Championship game participant; ^ – NJCAA National Championship participant; Rankings from NJCAA poll

2015 Northeast Football Conference standings
	Conf.			Overall
Team	W		L	W		L
No. 12 Lackawanna $	4	–	0	8	–	2
ASA Brooklyn	2	–	2	6	–	5
Dean	2	–	2	6	–	3
Monroe	1	–	3	3	–	6
Nassau	1	–	3	3	–	6
$ – Conference champion; Rankings from NJCAA poll

2015 Southwest Junior College Football Conference standings
	Conf.			Overall
Team	W		L	W		L
Trinity Valley †	5	–	1	7	–	3
No. 16 Tyler †	4	–	2	7	–	3
Navarro †y	4	–	2	7	–	4
Kilgore †y$	3	–	3	7	–	5
Blinn	2	–	4	5	–	4
NE Oklahoma A&M	2	–	4	4	–	5
Cisco	1	–	5	3	–	5
Championship: Kilgore 42, Navarro 28
$ – Conference champion; † – Conference playoff participant; y – Championship game participant; Rankings from NJCAA poll

2015 Western States Football League standings
	Conf.			Overall
Team	W		L	W		L
No. 2 Snow y$^	7	–	1	10	–	1
No. 19 Arizona Western ^	5	–	3	7	–	4
Pima y^	5	–	3	7	–	4
Eastern Arizona	5	–	3	7	–	4
New Mexico Military ^	5	–	3	6	–	5
Scottsdale	4	–	4	7	–	4
Glendale (AZ)	3	–	5	3	–	7
Mesa (AZ)	2	–	6	3	–	7
Phoenix	0	–	8	0	–	8
WSFL championship: Snow 26, Pima 16
$ – Conference champion; y – Championship game participant; ^ – WSFL playoff participant; Rankings from NJCAA polls

2015 NJCAA independents football records
	Conf.			Overall
Team	W		L	W		L
No. 15 Louisburg		–		7	–	1
ASA Miami		–		8	–	2
No. 9 DuPage		–		8	–	2
Hudson Valley		–		6	–	2
Globe Tech		–		8	–	3
No. 20 Georgia Military		–		8	–	4
Erie		–		6	–	4
Arkansas Baptist		–		1	–	9
Rankings from NJCAA poll

== Postseason ==
=== Playoffs ===
==== NJCAA ====
NJCAA National Championship; December 6 Biloxi Indian Stadium—Biloxi, MS
1	Northwest Mississippi	66
2	Rochester C&T	13

==== CCCAA ====
===== SCFA playoffs =====
Semifinals; November 21; Campus sites
1	Fullerton	37
4	Riverside City	20
2	Cerritos	30
3	Long Beach City	34

Regional finals November 28; Campus sites
1	Saddleback	43
3	Long Beach City	17

===== NCFC playoffs =====
Semifinals; November 21; Campus sites
1	CC of San Francisco	30
4	Butte	13
2	San Mateo	55
3	Chabot	76

Regional finals November 28; Campus sites
1	CC of San Francisco	40
3	Chabot	30

===== State championship =====
December 13; George M. Rush Stadium—San Francisco, CA
1	CC of San Francisco	26
1	Saddleback	14

== See also ==
- 2015 NCAA Division I FBS football season
- 2015 NCAA Division I FCS football season
- 2015 NCAA Division II football season
- 2015 NCAA Division III football season
- 2015 NAIA football season
- 2015 CIS football season
