= 2017 junior college football season =

American junior college football season

- National Championship: May Memorial Stadium, Perkinston, MS, (NJCAA); Charles C. Hughes Stadium, Sacramento, CA, (CCCAA)
- Champion(s): East Mississippi (NJCAA); Fullerton (CCCAA)

The 2017 junior college football season was the season of intercollegiate junior college football running from September to December 2017. The season ended with two national champions: one from the National Junior College Athletic Association and one from the California Community College Athletic Association (CCCAA).

The NJCAA champion was East Mississippi who defeated Arizona Western 31–28 in the NJCAA National Football Championship. The CCCAA champion was Fullerton who defeated San Mateo 16–12 in the CCCAA State Championship.

== Conference standings ==
=== NJCAA ===
2017 Iowa Community College Athletic Conference football standings
	Conf.			Overall
Team	W		L	W		L
No. 2 Iowa Western $	2	–	0	11	–	1
Ellsworth	1	–	1	4	–	8
Iowa Central	0	–	2	1	–	10
$ – Conference champion; Rankings from NJCAA poll

2017 Kansas Jayhawk Community College Conference football standings
	Conf.			Overall
Team	W		L	W		L
No. 5 Independence $	6	–	1	9	–	2
No. 15 Butler (KS)	5	–	2	8	–	3
No. 13 Garden City	5	–	2	8	–	4
Hutchinson	4	–	3	7	–	5
Coffeyville	3	–	4	4	–	7
Fort Scott	2	–	5	4	–	6
Highland (KS)	2	–	5	4	–	6
Dodge City	1	–	6	4	–	7
$ – Conference champion; Rankings from NJCAA poll

2017 Minnesota College Athletic Conference football standings
	Conf.			Overall
Team	W		L	W		L
Eastern Division
Central Lakes x†	4	–	1	8	–	2
Rochester C&T x†	4	–	1	6	–	3
Mesabi Range x†y	4	–	1	7	–	5
Vermilion †	1	–	4	3	–	6
Itasca	1	–	4	2	–	6
Fond du Lac	1	–	4	1	–	7
Western Division
Dakota College x†	5	–	0	8	–	2
Northland (MN) †y$	3	–	2	9	–	3
NDSCS †	3	–	2	5	–	4
Ridgewater †	2	–	3	3	–	6
Minnesota West C&T	1	–	4	2	–	6
Minnesota State C&T	1	–	4	1	–	7
Championship: Northland 68, Mesabi Range 35
$ – Conference champion; † – Conference playoff participant; y – Championship game participant

2017 Mississippi Association of Community and Junior Colleges football standings
	Conf.			Overall
Team	W		L	W		L
North Division
No. 1 East Mississippi x†y$^	5	–	1	11	–	1
No. 7 Northwest Mississippi x†y	5	–	1	8	–	3
No. 10 Itawamba x	5	–	1	6	–	3
Holmes	3	–	3	6	–	3
Northeast Mississippi	2	–	4	3	–	6
Coahoma	1	–	5	2	–	7
Mississippi Delta	0	–	6	0	–	9
South Division
No. 9 Jones County x†	6	–	0	8	–	2
No. 11 Hinds †	5	–	1	6	–	3
Pearl River	4	–	2	5	–	4
Mississippi Gulf Coast	3	–	3	5	–	4
Copiah–Lincoln	2	–	4	4	–	5
Southwest Mississippi	1	–	5	1	–	8
East Central (MS)	0	–	6	1	–	8
Championship: East Mississippi 67, Northwest Mississippi 66
$ – Conference champion; x – Division champion/co-champions; † – Conference playoff participant; y – Championship game participant; ^ – NJCAA National Championship participant; Rankings from NJCAA poll

2017 Northeast Football Conference standings
	Conf.			Overall
Team	W		L	W		L
No. 14 ASA Brooklyn $	2	–	0	9	–	1
No. 19 Lackawanna	1	–	1	7	–	2
Monroe	0	–	2	8	–	2
$ – Conference champion; Rankings from NJCAA poll

2017 Southwest Junior College Football Conference standings
	Conf.			Overall
Team	W		L	W		L
No. 8 NE Oklahoma A&M †y$	5	–	2	9	–	3
No. 6 Trinity Valley †y	5	–	2	9	–	3
No. 12 Blinn †	5	–	2	6	–	4
No. 17 Navarro †	4	–	3	6	–	4
Kilgore	4	–	3	5	–	4
Tyler	3	–	4	4	–	5
New Mexico Military	1	–	6	3	–	6
Cisco	1	–	6	2	–	8
Championship: NE Oklahoma A&M 26, Trinity Valley 10
$ – Conference champion; † – Conference playoff participant; y – Championship game participant; Rankings from NJCAA poll

2017 Western States Football League standings
	Conf.			Overall
Team	W		L	W		L
No. 3 Arizona Western $^	7	–	0	9	–	1
No. 4 Snow	6	–	1	10	–	1
No. 20 Eastern Arizona	4	–	3	8	–	4
Mesa (AZ)	4	–	3	6	–	5
Scottsdale	3	–	4	6	–	4
Phoenix	2	–	5	3	–	7
Glendale (AZ)	2	–	5	2	–	8
Pima	0	–	7	2	–	9
$ – Conference champion; ^ – NJCAA National Championship participant; Rankings from NJCAA poll

2017 NJCAA independents football records
	Conf.			Overall
Team	W		L	W		L
No. 16 Louisburg		–		7	–	0
No. 18 Georgia Military		–		8	–	2
DuPage		–		7	–	3
Nassau		–		5	–	4
ASA Miami		–		3	–	3
Erie		–		4	–	5
Hocking		–		4	–	6
Arkansas Baptist		–		1	–	7
Hudson Valley		–		1	–	9
Rankings from NJCAA poll

=== CCCAA ===
==== SCFA ====
2017 American Metro League standings
	Conf.			Overall
Team	W		L	W		L
Santa Ana $	6	–	0	7	–	4
East Los Angeles	5	–	1	7	–	3
Pasadena City	4	–	2	5	–	5
West Los Angeles	3	–	3	3	–	7
Glendale (CA)	2	–	4	2	–	8
Compton	1	–	5	1	–	9
Los Angeles Southwest	0	–	6	0	–	10
$ – Conference champion

2017 National Central League standings
	Conf.			Overall
Team	W		L	W		L
No. 4 Riverside City +^	4	–	1	10	–	2
No. 11 Long Beach City +	4	–	1	8	–	3
No. 8 Mt. San Antonio +	4	–	1	8	–	3
No. 17 El Camino	2	–	3	6	–	5
Chaffey	1	–	4	2	–	8
Los Angeles Harbor	0	–	5	2	–	8
+ – Conference co-champions; ^ – CCCAA playoff participant; Rankings from CCCAA poll

2017 American Mountain League standings
	Conf.			Overall
Team	W		L	W		L
No. 18 Southwestern (CA) $	5	–	0	9	–	2
No. 19 San Diego Mesa	4	–	1	9	–	2
Mt. San Jacinto	2	–	3	5	–	5
San Bernardino Valley	2	–	3	5	–	5
Victor Valley	1	–	4	5	–	5
Desert	1	–	4	4	–	6
$ – Conference champion; Rankings from CCCAA poll

2017 National Northern League standings
	Conf.			Overall
Team	W		L	W		L
No. 7 Ventura $^	5	–	0	8	–	3
No. 5 College of the Canyons	4	–	1	9	–	2
No. 16 Bakersfield	3	–	2	7	–	4
Moorpark	2	–	3	3	–	7
Cerritos	1	–	4	3	–	7
Santa Monica	0	–	5	1	–	9
$ – Conference champion; ^ – CCCAA playoff participant; Rankings from CCCAA poll

2017 American Pacific League standings
	Conf.			Overall
Team	W		L	W		L
No. 23 Allan Hancock $	5	–	0	8	–	3
Antelope Valley	3	–	2	5	–	5
Pierce	3	–	2	5	–	5
Citrus	2	–	3	3	–	7
Los Angeles Valley	1	–	4	4	–	6
Santa Barbara City	1	–	4	4	–	6
$ – Conference champion; Rankings from CCCAA poll

2017 National Southern League standings
	Conf.			Overall
Team	W		L	W		L
No. 1 Fullerton $^	5	–	0	13	–	0
No. 9 Saddleback ^	4	–	1	8	–	3
Golden West	2	–	3	4	–	6
Grossmont	2	–	3	4	–	6
Palomar	1	–	4	5	–	6
Orange Coast	1	–	4	2	–	8
$ – Conference champion; ^ – CCCAA playoff participant; Rankings from CCCAA poll

==== NCFC ====
2017 American Golden Coast League standings
	Conf.			Overall
Team	W		L	W		L
No. 22 Merced +	5	–	1	9	–	2
Monterey Peninsula +	5	–	1	7	–	4
West Hills Coalinga	4	–	2	6	–	3
Hartnell	4	–	2	5	–	5
Reedley	2	–	4	4	–	6
Cabrillo	1	–	5	2	–	8
Gavilan	0	–	6	0	–	10
+ – Conference co-champions; Rankings from CCCAA poll

2017 American Pacific 7 League standings
	Conf.			Overall
Team	W		L	W		L
No. 25 Shasta $	4	–	1	7	–	3
No. 20 Los Medanos	3	–	2	9	–	2
Foothill	3	–	2	7	–	3
Yuba	3	–	2	7	–	3
College of the Redwoods	1	–	4	2	–	8
San Jose City	1	–	4	2	–	8
$ – Conference champion; Rankings from CCCAA poll

2017 National Bay 6 League standings
	Conf.			Overall
Team	W		L	W		L
No. 2 San Mateo $^	5	–	0	11	–	2
No. 10 CC of San Francisco	4	–	1	8	–	3
Santa Rosa	2	–	2	2	–	7
No. 24 Diablo Valley	2	–	3	5	–	6
De Anza	1	–	4	2	–	8
Contra Costa	0	–	4	0	–	9
$ – Conference champion; ^ – CCCAA playoff participant; Rankings from CCCAA poll

2017 National Norcal League standings
	Conf.			Overall
Team	W		L	W		L
No. 3 American River $^	5	–	0	10	–	2
No. 12 College of the Siskiyous ^	4	–	1	8	–	3
No. 14 Sacramento City	3	–	2	8	–	3
No. 21 Butte	2	–	3	5	–	6
Sierra	1	–	4	4	–	6
Feather River	0	–	5	1	–	9
$ – Conference champion; ^ – CCCAA playoff participant; Rankings from CCCAA poll

2017 National Valley League standings
	Conf.			Overall
Team	W		L	W		L
No. 6 Laney $^	5	–	0	9	–	2
No. 13 Fresno City	4	–	1	8	–	3
No. 15 Modesto	3	–	2	6	–	5
San Joaquin Delta	2	–	3	4	–	6
Chabot	1	–	4	2	–	8
College of the Sequoias	0	–	5	2	–	8
$ – Conference champion; ^ – CCCAA playoff participant; Rankings from CCCAA poll

== Postseason ==
=== Playoffs ===
==== NJCAA ====
Championship game December 3 May Memorial—Perkinston, MS
1	East Mississippi	31
2	Arizona Western	28

==== CCCAA ====
===== SCFA playoffs =====
Semifinals; November 18; Campus sites
1	Fullerton	33
4	Saddleback	21
2	Riverside City	49
3	Ventura	33

Regional finals November 25; Campus sites
1	Fullerton	75
2	Riverside City	16

===== NCFC playoffs =====
Semifinals; November 18; Campus sites
1	American River	41
4	Laney	35
2	San Mateo	52
3	College of the Siskiyous	3

Regional finals November 25; Campus sites
1	American River	21
2	San Mateo	21

===== State championship =====
Mississippi Bowl; December 9 Charles C. Hughes Stadium—Sacramento, CA
2	Fullerton	16
4	San Mateo	12

== See also ==
- 2017 NCAA Division I FBS football season
- 2017 NCAA Division I FCS football season
- 2017 NCAA Division II football season
- 2017 NCAA Division III football season
- 2017 NAIA football season
- 2017 U Sports football season
