= 2008 junior college football season =

American junior college football season

- National Championship: Rio Tinto Stadium, Sandy, UT, (NJCAA); Costa Mesa, CA, (CCCAA)
- Champion(s): Butler (KS) (NJCAA); Butte (CCCAA)

The 2008 junior college football season was the season of intercollegiate junior college football running from September to December 2008. The season ended with two national champions: one from the National Junior College Athletic Association and one from the California Community College Athletic Association (CCCAA).

The NJCAA champion was Butler (KS) who defeated Snow 37–30 in double overtime in the NJCAA National Football Championship. The CCCAA champion was Butte who defeated Mt. San Antonio 17–9 in the CCCAA State Championship.

== Conference standings ==
=== NJCAA ===
2008 Kansas Jayhawk Community College Conference football standings
	Conf.			Overall
Team	W		L	W		L
Butler (KS) †y$	7	–	0	11	–	1
Fort Scott †	6	–	1	9	–	2
Hutchinson †y	4	–	3	7	–	4
Garden City †	4	–	3	6	–	4
Coffeyville	2	–	5	3	–	6
Independence	2	–	5	2	–	7
Dodge City	2	–	5	2	–	7
Highland (KS)	1	–	6	1	–	8
Championship: Butler (KS) 29, Hutchinson 14
$ – Conference champion; † – Conference playoff participant; y – Championship game participant

2008 Midwest Football Conference standings
	Conf.			Overall
Team	W		L	W		L
East Division
Harper x	7	–	1	11	–	1
DuPage	4	–	4	6	–	6
Grand Rapids	3	–	5	3	–	7
Joliet	3	–	5	4	–	6
Rock Valley	2	–	6	3	–	6
West Division
Ellsworth	7	–	1	8	–	3
Iowa Central x	5	–	3	8	–	3
NDSCS	3	–	5	5	–	5
North Iowa Area	2	–	6	3	–	6
$ – Conference champion; x – Division champion/co-champions

2008 Minnesota College Athletic Conference football standings
	Conf.			Overall
Team	W		L	W		L
North Division
Vermilion x†y	3	–	1	8	–	3
Mesabi Range x†y$	3	–	1	6	–	5
Fond du Lac	2	–	2	2	–	7
Itasca	0	–	4	1	–	8
Northland (MN) *	0	–	4	0	–	9
South Division
Minnesota West C&T x†	3	–	1	7	–	3
Central Lakes x†	3	–	1	7	–	3
Rochester C&T x	3	–	1	8	–	3
Ridgewater	1	–	3	5	–	4
Minnesota State C&T	0	–	4	2	–	7
Championship: Mesabi Range 6, Vermilion 0
$ – Conference champion; † – Conference playoff participant; y – Championship game participant; * – Northland forfeited all wins from the 2008 season

2008 Northeast Football Conference standings
	Conf.			Overall
Team	W		L	W		L
Dean $	5	–	0	10	–	1
Nassau	4	–	1	6	–	4
Lackawanna	3	–	2	7	–	4
Erie	2	–	3	4	–	6
Hudson Valley	1	–	4	3	–	6
Alfred State	0	–	5	4	–	5
$ – Conference champion

2008 Southwest Junior College Football Conference standings
	Conf.			Overall
Team	W		L	W		L
Navarro †y	7	–	0	10	–	1
Blinn †y$	5	–	2	9	–	3
Kilgore †	5	–	2	6	–	4
Trinity Valley †	4	–	3	6	–	4
Tyler	4	–	3	5	–	4
NE Oklahoma A&M	2	–	5	3	–	6
Cisco	1	–	6	2	–	7
Championship: Blinn 49, Navarro 24
$ – Conference champion; † – Conference playoff participant; y – Championship game participant

2008 Western States Football League standings
	Conf.			Overall
Team	W		L	W		L
Snow $	8	–	0	11	–	1
Glendale (AZ)	6	–	2	8	–	2
Phoenix	6	–	2	7	–	4
Eastern Arizona	5	–	3	8	–	3
Arizona Western	4	–	4	5	–	5
New Mexico Military	3	–	5	5	–	6
Mesa (AZ)	3	–	5	3	–	7
Scottsdale	1	–	7	3	–	7
Pima	0	–	8	0	–	10
$ – Conference champion

2008 NJCAA independents football records
	Conf.			Overall
Team	W		L	W		L
Georgia Military		–		9	–	2
Louisburg		–		5	–	4
Globe Tech		–		3	–	5
Arkansas Baptist *		–		0	–	9
* – Arkansas Baptist forfeited all games

=== CCCAA ===
==== NCFA ====
2008 Coast Conference football standings
	Conf.			Overall
Team	W		L	W		L
Monterey Peninsula $	5	–	0	10	–	0
De Anza	4	–	1	7	–	3
West Valley	3	–	2	5	–	5
San Jose City	2	–	3	3	–	7
Gavilan	1	–	4	3	–	7
Hartnell	0	–	5	2	–	8
$ – Conference champion

2008 NorCal Conference football standings
	Conf.			Overall
Team	W		L	W		L
Butte $	5	–	0	10	–	0
CC of San Francisco	4	–	1	7	–	3
Santa Rosa	3	–	2	7	–	3
Foothill	2	–	3	7	–	3
San Mateo	1	–	4	5	–	5
Diablo Valley	0	–	5	2	–	8
$ – Conference champion

== Postseason ==
=== Playoffs ===
==== NJCAA ====
NJCAA National Championship; December 9 Rio Tinto Stadium—Sandy, UT
1	Butler (KS)	37
2	Snow	30

==== CCCAA ====
===== SCFA =====
Semifinals; November 29; Campus sites
1	College of the Canyons	36
4	El Camino	27
2	Fullerton	27
3	Mt. San Antonio	34

Regional finals December 6 Campus sites
1	College of the Canyons	44
3	Mt. San Antonio	51

===== NCFA =====
Regional finals November 22; Campus sites
1	Butte	24
2	Reedley	21

===== State championship =====
December 13; Costa Mesa, CA
1	Butte	17
3	Mt. San Antonio	9

== See also ==
- 2008 NCAA Division I FBS football season
- 2008 NCAA Division I FCS football season
- 2008 NCAA Division II football season
- 2008 NCAA Division III football season
- 2008 NAIA football season
- 2008 CIS football season
