= NJCAA women's basketball championship =

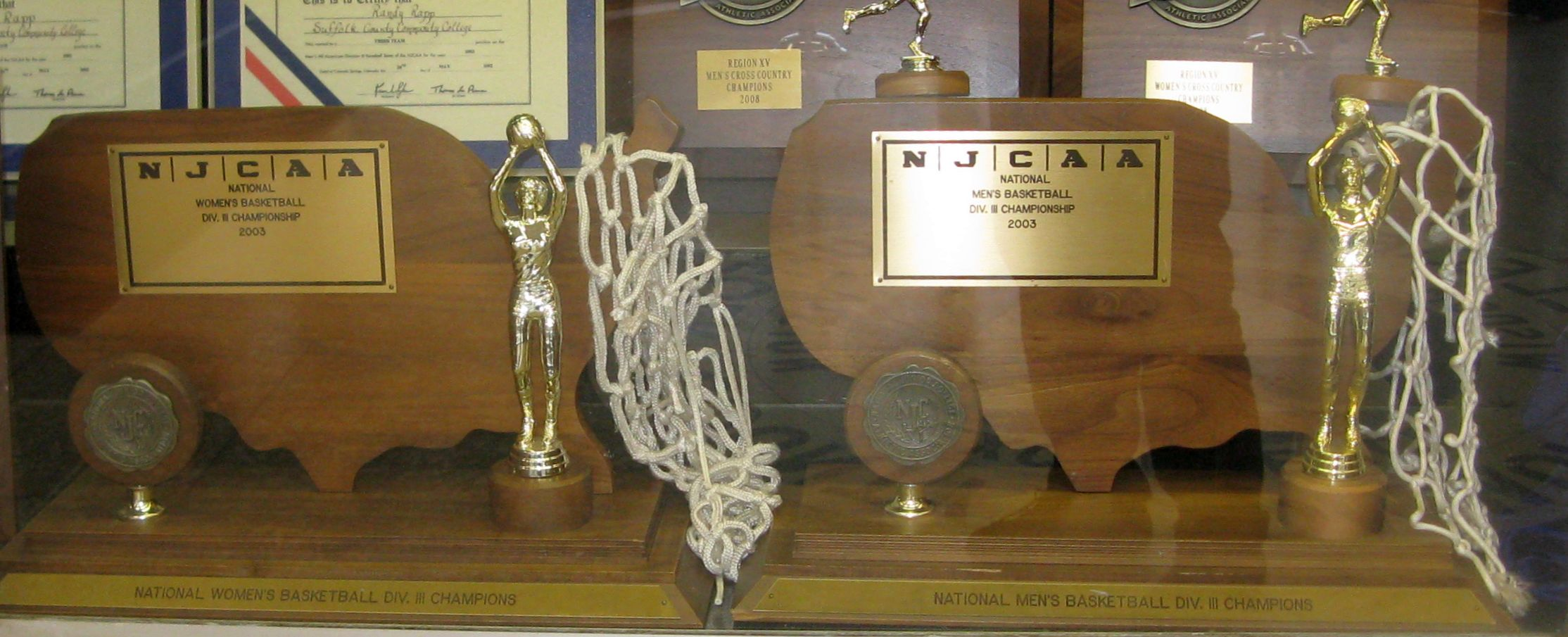
Women and men championship trophies in 2003 at Suffolk County Community College

The NJCAA women's basketball championship is an American intercollegiate basketball tournament conducted by the National Junior College Athletic Association (NJCAA), and determines the women's national champion. The tournament has been held since 1975. There are three divisions, I, II and III. The most successful program, Trinity Valley Community College, has won Division I eight times, including three straight championships from 2012 to 2015. From 1998 to 2014, the tournament was hosted at Bicentennial Center in Salina, Kansas. The 2016-2018 tournaments will be held at Rip Griffin Center, on the campus of former NJCAA member Lubbock Christian University, in Lubbock, Texas.

== Division II ==
Year	Winner	Runner up	Score
1992	Illinois Central College	Lansing Community College	89-72
1993	Illinois Central College	Kankakee Community College	76-71 (OT)
1994	Southwestern Michigan College	Chattahoochee Valley Community College	81-72
1995	Kankakee Community College	St. Clair County Community College	95-83 (3 OT)
1996	Lansing Community College	Kankakee Community College	74-68
1997	Kirkwood Community College	Carl Sandburg College	76-67
1998	Illinois Central College	Penn Valley Community College	72-65
1999	Illinois Central College	Northwest-Shoals Community College	86-81
2000	Johnson County Community College	Monroe Community College	63-61
2001	Monroe Community College	Frederick Community College	69-41
2002	Kirkwood Community College	Penn Valley Community College	76-47
2003	Illinois Central College	Mitchell College	80-67
2004	Monroe Community College	Scottsdale Community College	63-41
2005	Monroe Community College	Illinois Central College	62-46
2006	Illinois Central College	Kirkwood Community College	71-54
2007	Kirkwood Community College	Kankakee Community College	84-55
2008	Kirkwood Community College	Kankakee Community College	78-53
2009	Kirkwood Community College	Schoolcraft College	62-38
2010	Kirkwood Community College	Patrick & Henry Community College	72-62
2011	Monroe College	Pima Community College	78-74
2012	Monroe College	Lake Michigan College	78-73
2013	Louisburg College	Mesa Community College	75-65
2014	Mesa Community College	Highland Community College	82-77 (OT)
2015	Johnson County Community College	Parkland College	66-64
2016	Kansas City Kansas Community College	Illinois Central College	81-59
2017	Kirkwood Community College	Johnson County Community College	61-46
2018	Monroe Community College	Kirkwood Community College	62-58
2019	Kansas City Kansas Community College	Union County College	84-59
2020	Tournament cancelled due to COVID-19 pandemic		
2021	Lake Land College	Johnson County Community College	72-69 (OT)
2022	Kirkwood Community College	Morton College	49-44
2023	CCBC Essex (MD)	Richard Bland (VA)	95-85 (OT)
2024	Kirkwood Community College	Johnson County Community College	69-58
2025	Johnson County Community College	Pima Community College	75-67
2026	Pima Community College	Kirkwood Community College	64-58

== Division III ==
Year	Winner	Runner up	Score
1992	Becker College	Ocean County College	87-54
1993	Hudson Valley Community College	Quinsigamond Community College	51-50
1994	Anoka-Ramsey Community College	Triton College	69-62
1995	Rainy River Community College	Montgomery College	83-60
1996	Central Lakes College - Brainerd	Monroe Community College	71-57
1997	Anoka-Ramsey Community College	Monroe Community College	80-57
1998	Anoka-Ramsey Community College	College of DuPage	73-48
1999	Anoka-Ramsey Community College	Jefferson Community College	68-62
2000	College of DuPage	Anoka-Ramsey Community College	72-61
2001	Fergus Falls Community College	Borough of Manhattan Community College	61-58
2002	College of DuPage	Northland Community & Technical College	66-49
2003	Suffolk County Community College	Madison Area Technical College	63-53
2004	Minneapolis Community & Technical College	College of DuPage	79-77 (OT)
2005	Anoka-Ramsey Community College	Monroe College	64-60
2006	Monroe College	Mohawk Valley Community College	100-70
2007	Anoka-Ramsey Community College	Mohawk Valley Community College	52-44
2008	Monroe College	Mohawk Valley Community College	79-48
2009	Rochester Community & Tech College	Madison Area Technical College	87-63
2010	Madison Area Technical College	Onondaga Community College	74-55
2011	Anoka-Ramsey Community College	Roxbury Community College	60-55
2012	Rock Valley College	Roxbury Community College	82-64
2013	Rock Valley College	Mohawk Valley Community College	78-60
2014	Northland Community & Technical College	Anoka-Ramsey Community College	77-72
2015	Rock Valley College	Roxbury Community College	80-78 (OT)
2016	Roxbury Community College	Northland Community & Technical College	61-57
2017	Rock Valley College	Roxbury Community College	57-49
2018	Hostos Community College	Rock Valley College	58-52
2019	Hostos Community College	Owens Community College	73-63
2020	Western Technical College	Northland Community & Technical College	69-60
2022	Owens Community College	Hostos Community College	65-56
2023	Rochester Community and Technical College	Minnesota West Community and Technical College	73-53
2024	Minnesota West Community and Technical College	Rochester Community and Technical College	76-60
2025	Rochester Community and Technical College	Jefferson Community College	73-37
2026	Minnesota West Community and Technical College	Anoka-Ramsey Community College	51-41

== See also ==
- NJCAA Division I men's basketball championship
- NJCAA Division II men's basketball championship
- NJCAA Division III men's basketball championship
