= Central Minnesota =

Region of Minnesota, United States

Coordinates: 47°N 95°W

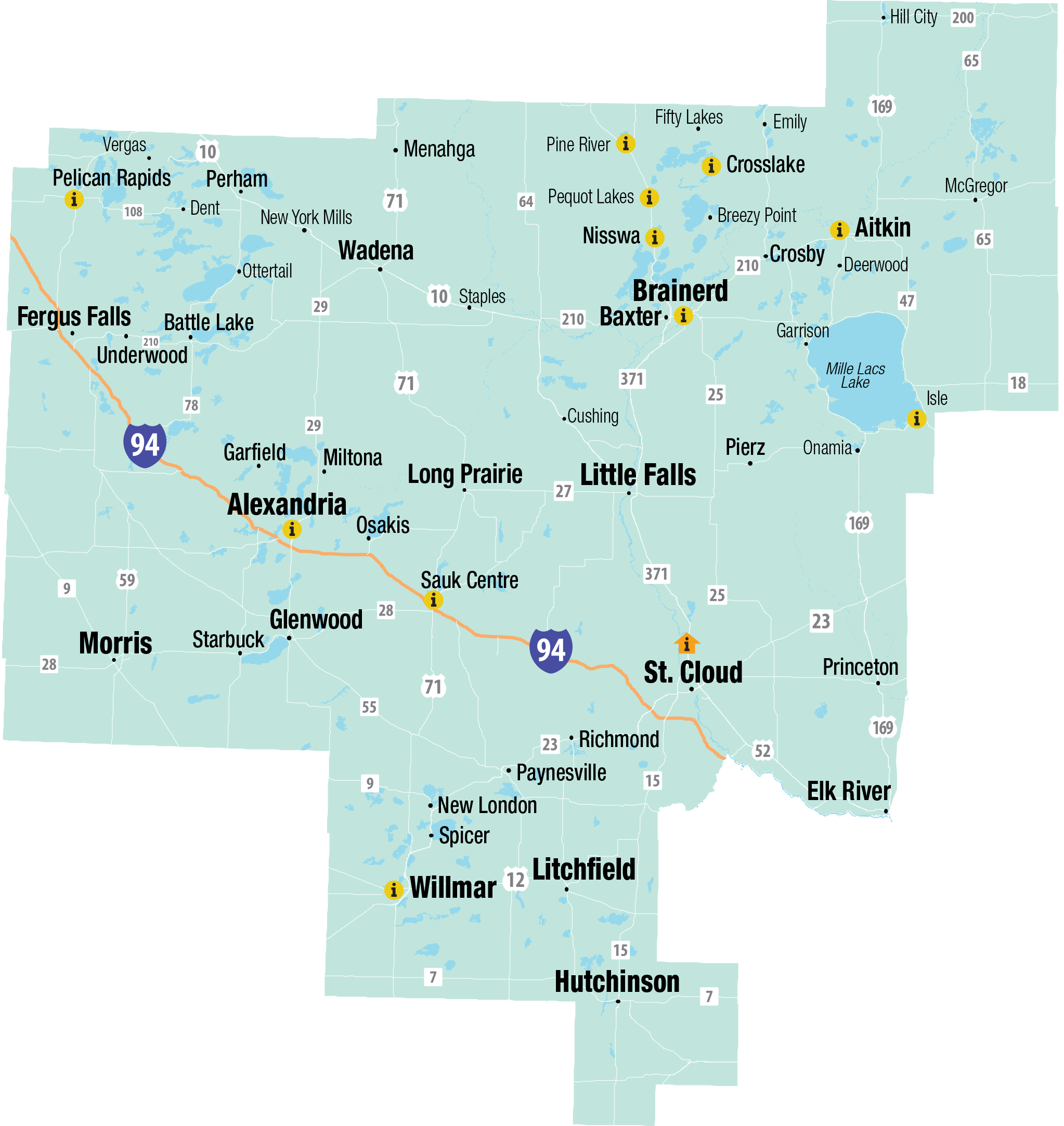
A political map of the Central Minnesota region provided from ExploreMinnesota.com, a Minnesota State agency.

Central Minnesota is the central part of the state of Minnesota. No definitive boundaries of the region exist, but most definitions would include the land north of Interstate 94, east of U.S. Highway 59, south of U.S. Highway 2, and west of U.S. Highway 169.

== Geography ==
The northern part of the region contains many softwood forests, including the expansive Chippewa National Forest. The western and southern parts are dotted with rolling prairie, and have the region's largest agricultural operations. The region's eastern part has many hardwood and softwood forests, and once had rich iron ore deposits . The now depleted Cuyuna Range, which formed the southwestern border of the large Iron Range, was near Crosby and Ironton, at the region's eastern edge.

One thing all of central Minnesota has is abundant lakes. A typical image of central Minnesota includes the many large and small lakes that surround the cities of St. Cloud (by far the region's largest city), Alexandria, Brainerd, and other settlements.

Two lakes in the region, Mille Lacs Lake, with an area of 206 mi^{2} (534 km^{2}), and Leech Lake, with an area of 175 mi^{2} (453 km^{2}), are, respectively, the second- and third-largest lakes entirely within Minnesota. The Mississippi River winds extensively through the region from its source at Lake Itasca.

Area high school athletic conferences acknowledge the region's location and natural geography with names including Central Lakes, Granite Ridge, Great River, Heart O'Lakes, Mid-State, and Pine to Prairie.

== Economy ==
Central Minnesota's economy, like that of the United States as a whole, has recently shifted away from agriculture and mining toward industry and service. But agriculture is still important in the region, especially the southern and western parts, where the land and soil is conducive to crops such as corn and soybeans. Dairy farms also dot the region in areas where crops cannot easily be grown, but their numbers have been drastically dwindling in recent years. Paper companies own expansive amounts of land in the region's heavily forested eastern and northern parts, but logging activity has long since peaked. Paper production mills continue to operate in Brainerd.

Tourism has become an important industry in the region in the last few decades, fueled largely by its lakes. Many of the region's cities see their populations swell in the summer, when people from the larger metropolitan areas of Minneapolis/St. Paul, Duluth, Fargo, and Grand Forks come to enjoy fishing and other outdoor activities on the region's lakes. The cluster of lakes around Brainerd known as the Brainerd Lakes Area are probably the best-known, thanks in part to the many Twin Cities residents who own cabins or land on or near the area's biggest lakes. In addition, several esteemed resorts are on Gull Lake.

== Culture ==
The ethnic makeup of central Minnesota is largely representative of the first settlers who came to the region. People of German and Scandinavian heritage are the majority of the region's residents, though there is also a sizable Native American population. Two of the state's largest reservations, the Leech Lake Indian Reservation and the White Earth Indian Reservation, are in central Minnesota, as is the small Mille Lacs Indian Reservation, along the southern shore of Mille Lacs Lake, from near Garrison to Isle.

The region has a prominent Catholic population, and correspondingly has many Catholic institutions such as churches, schools, and colleges.

The 1996 film Fargo and its television series are largely set in the region's cities of Brainerd and Bemidji, but central Minnesotans' accents are not as pronounced as those in the franchise. The central Minnesotan dialect resembles that of the entire Upper Midwest.

== Cities ==
Central Minnesota is home to one MSA and 5 μSAs.

St. Cloud MSA (pop. 201,868)

- Saint Cloud (pop. 69,568)
- Sartell (pop. 19,696)
- Sauk Rapids (pop. 13,962)
- Waite Park (pop. 8,341)
- St. Joseph (pop. 6,932)
- Sauk Centre (pop. 4,610)
- Cold Spring (pop. 4,249)
- Melrose (pop. 3,611)
- St. Augusta (pop. 3,545)
- Albany (pop. 2,832)
- Foley (pop. 2,673)
- Paynesville (pop. 2,558)
- Rockville (pop. 2,426)
- Rice (pop. 2,177)
- Avon (pop. 1,693)
- Richmond (pop. 1,503)
- Royalton (part) (pop. 1,281)
- Eden Valley (part) (pop. 1,027)

Brainerd μSA (pop. 99,222)

- Brainerd (pop. 14,580)
- Baxter (pop. 8,971)
- Breezy Point (pop. 2,603)
- Pequot Lakes (pop. 2,395)
- Crosslake (pop. 2,394)
- Crosby (pop. 2,360)
- Nisswa (pop. 1,976)
- Lake Shore (pop. 1,090)

Willmar μSA (pop. 43,813)

- Willmar (pop. 21,282
- New London (pop. 1,282)
- Spicer (pop. 1,167)
- Atwater (pop. 1,114)

Fergus Falls μSA (pop. 60,626)

- Fergus Falls (pop. 14,214)
- Wadena (part) (pop. 4,331)
- Perham (pop. 3,666)
- Pelican Rapids (pop. 2,597)
- New York Mills (pop. 1,355)
- Parkers Prairie (pop. 1,028)

Alexandria μSA (pop. 39,933)

- Alexandria (pop. 14,943)
- Osakis (part) (pop. 1,771)

Hutchinson μSA (pop. 36,785)

- Hutchinson (pop. 14,599)
- Glencoe (pop. 5,744)
- Winsted (pop. 2,240)
- Lester Prairie (pop. 1,894)

Other Central Minnesota cities include:

- Elk River (pop. 27,342) (included in Minneapolis-St. Paul-Bloomington MSA)
- Detroit Lakes (pop. 9,165) (one county east of the Fargo-Moorhead MSA)
- Little Falls (pop. 9,981)
- Litchfield (pop. 6,541)
- Princeton (pop. 5,312) (included in Minneapolis-St. Paul-Bloomington MSA)
- Morris (pop. 5,140)
- Long Prairie (pop. 3,661)
- Glenwood (pop. 2,637)
- Aitkin (pop. 2,152)
- Starbuck (pop. 1,405)
- Menahga (pop. 1,347)

== Higher education ==
Central Minnesota is home to the following colleges and universities:

Four-year colleges

- College of Saint Benedict/Saint John's University
- St. Cloud State University
- University of Minnesota Morris

Two-year colleges

- Alexandria Technical and Community College
- Central Lakes College
- Minnesota State Community and Technical College (Detroit Lakes, Fergus Falls, and Wadena campuses)
- St. Cloud Technical and Community College
- Ridgewater College

== Notable residents ==
Notable people who hail from central Minnesota, with the names of cities they are associated with listed in parentheses, include:

- Brian Kobilka (Little Falls)
- Charles Lindbergh (Little Falls)
- Sinclair Lewis (Sauk Centre)
- Eugene McCarthy (Watkins)
- Gig Young (St. Cloud)
- Stephen Miller (St. Cloud)
- June Marlowe (St. Cloud)
- Lesley J. McNair (Verndale)
- Knute Nelson (Alexandria)
- Edward Hanson (Alexandria)
- Henrik Shipstead (Glenwood)
- Ernest O. Wollan (Glenwood)
- Lindsay Whalen (Hutchinson)
- Richard Edlund (Fergus Falls)
