= List of junior college football programs in the United States =

This is a list of junior colleges in the United States that field a football program. The two largest associations are the National Junior College Athletic Association (NJCAA) and California Community College Athletic Association (CCCAA).

In the NJCAA, of 512 member colleges, 53 sponsored a football program, as of November 2023. This reflects the elimination of football at seven Arizona community colleges in 2018; one in Minnesota and one in North Dakota in 2019; and one in Kansas in 2021.

In California, of 114 community colleges in the state, 67 sponsored a football program under the auspices of the CCCAA, as of November 2021. This reflects the suspension of football at two CCCAA member institutions in 2020.

As shown below, the NJCAA is organized into five conferences (or leagues): Kansas Jayhawk Community College Conference; Minnesota College Athletic Conference; Mississippi Association of Community & Junior Colleges; Northeast Football Conference; Southwest Junior College Football Conference; as well as Independents (no conference/league affiliation.)

The CCCAA divides its membership into two regions: Northern and Southern. Each region is divided into the National Conference and the American Conference. In Northern California, there are three conferences/leagues in the National and two in the American; in Southern California, there are three conferences/leagues in both the National and the American.

== NJCAA football programs ==
School	Team	City	State	Conference
Blinn	Buccaneers	Brenham	Texas	Southwest Junior College Football Conference
Butler CC	Grizzlies	El Dorado	Kansas	Kansas Jayhawk Community College Conference
Central Lakes	Raiders	Brainerd	Minnesota	Minnesota College Athletic Conference
Cisco	Wranglers	Cisco	Texas	Southwest Junior College Football Conference
Coahoma CC	Tigers	Clarksdale	Mississippi	Mississippi Association of Community & Junior Colleges
Coffeyville CC	Red Ravens	Coffeyville	Kansas	Kansas Jayhawk Community College Conference
Community Christian College (MI)	Lions	Detroit	Michigan	Independent
DuPage	Chaparrals	Glen Ellyn	Illinois	Independent
Copiah-Lincoln CC	Wolfpack	Wesson	Mississippi	Mississippi Association of Community & Junior Colleges
Dodge City CC	Conquistadors	Dodge City	Kansas	Kansas Jayhawk Community College Conference
East Central CC	Warriors	Decatur	Mississippi	Mississippi Association of Community & Junior Colleges
East Mississippi CC	Lions	Scooba	Mississippi	Mississippi Association of Community & Junior Colleges
Ellsworth CC	Panthers	Iowa Falls	Iowa	Iowa Community College Athletic Conference
Erie CC	Kats	Buffalo	New York	Independent
Fond du Lac	Thunder	Cloquet	Minnesota	Minnesota College Athletic Conference
Garden City CC	Broncbusters	Garden City	Kansas	Kansas Jayhawk Community College Conference
Georgia Military	Bulldogs	Milledgeville	Georgia	Independent
Highland CC	Scotties	Highland	Kansas	Kansas Jayhawk Community College Conference
Hinds CC	Eagles	Raymond	Mississippi	Mississippi Association of Community & Junior Colleges
Holmes CC	Bulldogs	Goodman	Mississippi	Mississippi Association of Community & Junior Colleges
Hudson Valley CC	Vikings	Troy	New York	Independent
Hutchinson CC	Blue Dragons	Hutchinson	Kansas	Kansas Jayhawk Community College Conference
Independence CC	Pirates	Independence	Kansas	Kansas Jayhawk Community College Conference
Iowa Central CC	Tritons	Fort Dodge	Iowa	Iowa Community College Athletic Conference
Iowa Western CC	Reivers	Council Bluffs	Iowa	Iowa Community College Athletic Conference
Itasca CC	Vikings	Grand Rapids	Minnesota	Minnesota College Athletic Conference
Itawamba CC	Indians	Fulton	Mississippi	Mississippi Association of Community & Junior Colleges
Jones County JC	Bobcat	Ellisville	Mississippi	Mississippi Association of Community & Junior Colleges
Kilgore	Rangers	Kilgore	Texas	Southwest Junior College Football Conference
Lackawanna	Falcons	Scranton	Pennsylvania	Northeast Football Conference
Louisburg	Hurricanes	Louisburg	North Carolina	Independent
Mesabi Range	Norse	Virginia	Minnesota	Minnesota College Athletic Conference
Minnesota State CTC	Spartans	Fergus Falls	Minnesota	Minnesota College Athletic Conference
Minnesota West CTC	Bluejays	Worthington	Minnesota	Minnesota College Athletic Conference
Mississippi Delta CC	Trojans	Moorhead	Mississippi	Mississippi Association of Community & Junior Colleges
Mississippi Gulf Coast CC	Bulldogs	Perkinston	Mississippi	Mississippi Association of Community & Junior Colleges
Monroe	Mustangs	New Rochelle	New York	Northeast Football Conference
Nassau CC	Lions	Garden City	New York	Northeast Football Conference
Navarro	Bulldogs	Corsicana	Texas	Southwest Junior College Football Conference
New Mexico Military Inst.	Broncos	Roswell	New Mexico	Southwest Junior College Football Conference
North Dakota State College of Science	Wildcats	Wahpeton	North Dakota	Minnesota College Athletic Conference
Northeast Mississippi CC	Tigers	Booneville	Mississippi	Mississippi Association of Community & Junior Colleges
Northeastern Oklahoma A&M	Golden Norsemen	Miami	Oklahoma	Southwest Junior College Football Conference
Northwest Mississippi CC	Rangers	Senatobia	Mississippi	Mississippi Association of Community & Junior Colleges
Pearl River CC	Wildcats	Poplarville	Mississippi	Mississippi Association of Community & Junior Colleges
Rochester CTC	Yellowjackets	Rochester	Minnesota	Minnesota College Athletic Conference
Snow	Badgers	Ephraim	Utah	Independent
Southwest Mississippi CC	Bears	Summit	Mississippi	Mississippi Association of Community & Junior Colleges
Trinity Valley CC	Cardinals	Athens	Texas	Southwest Junior College Football Conference
Tyler JC	Apaches	Tyler	Texas	Southwest Junior College Football Conference
Vermilion CC	Ironmen	Ely	Minnesota	Minnesota College Athletic Conference

== 3C2A football programs ==
=== Northern California Football Association programs ===
National Division
Conference	College	Team	City
Bay 6	DeAnza College	Mountain Lions	Cupertino, California
Bay 6	Foothill College	Owls	Los Altos Hills, California
Bay 6	Santa Rosa Junior College	Bearcats	Santa Rosa, California
Bay 6	City College of San Francisco	Rams	San Francisco, California
Bay 6	College of San Mateo	BULLDOGS	San Mateo, California
Bay 6	San Jose City College	Jaguars	San Jose, California
NorCal	American River College	Beavers	Sacramento, California
NorCal	Butte College	Roadrunners	Oroville, California
NorCal	Diablo Valley College	Vikings	Concord, California
NorCal	Laney College	Eagles	Oakland, California
NorCal	Sierra College	Wolverines	Rocklin, California
NorCal	College of the Redwoods	Corsairs	Eureka, California
Valley	Fresno City College	Rams	Fresno, California
Valley	Modesto Junior College	Pirates	Modesto, California
Valley	Monterey Peninsula College	Lobos	Monterey, California
Valley	Reedley College	Tigers	Reedley, California
Valley	College of the Sequoias	Giants	Visalia, California
Valley	Sacramento City College	Panthers	Sacramento, California

American
Conference	College	Team	City
Golden Coast	Gavilan College	Rams	Gilroy, California
Golden Coast	Hartnell College	Panthers	Salinas, California
Golden Coast	Merced College	Blue Devils	Merced, California
Golden Coast	Cabrillo College	Seahawks	Aptos, California
Golden Coast	Coalinga College	Falcons	Coalinga, California
Golden Coast	Shasta College	Knights	Shasta, California
Pacific 7	Chabot College	Gladiators	Hayward, California
Pacific 7	Contra Costa College	Comets	San Pablo, California
Pacific 7	Feather River College	Golden Eagles	Quincy, California
Pacific 7	College of the Siskiyous	Eagles	Weed, California
Pacific 7	Los Medanos College	Mustangs	Pittsburg, California
Pacific 7	San Joaquin Delta College	Mustangs	Stockton, California
Pacific 7	Note: only 6 members of the Pac-7 field football teams		

=== Southern California Football Association programs ===
National Division
Conference	College	Team	City
Central	Chaffey College	Panthers	Rancho Cucamonga, California
Central	El Camino College	Warriors	Torrance, California
Central	Long Beach City College	Vikings	Long Beach, California
Central	Los Angeles Harbor College	Seahawks	Wilmington, California
Central	Mount San Antonio College	Mounties	Walnut, California
Central	Riverside City College	Tigers	Riverside, California
Northern	Bakersfield College	Renegades	Bakersfield, California
Northern	College of the Canyons	Cougars	Santa Clarita, California
Northern	Cerritos College	Falcons	Norwalk, California
Northern	Moorpark College	Raiders	Moorpark, California
Northern	Santa Monica College	Corsairs	Santa Monica, California
Northern	Ventura College	Pirates	Ventura, California
Southern	Fullerton College	Hornets	Fullerton, California
Southern	Golden West College	Rustlers	Huntington Beach, California
Southern	Grossmont College	Griffins	El Cajon, California
Southern	Orange Coast College	Pirates	Costa Mesa, California
Southern	Palomar College	Comets	San Marcos, California
Southern	Saddleback College	Bobcats	Mission Viejo, California

American
Conference	College	Team	City
Mountain	College of the Desert	Roadrunners	Palm Desert, California
Mountain	Mt. San Jacinto College	Eagles	San Jacinto, California
Mountain	San Bernardino Valley College	Wolverines	San Bernardino, California
Mountain	San Diego Mesa College	Olympians	San Diego, California
Mountain	Southwestern College	Jaguars	Chula Vista, California
Mountain	Victor Valley College	Rams	Victorville, California
Metro	Compton College	Tartars	Compton, California
Metro	East Los Angeles College	Huskies	Monterey Park, California
Metro	Glendale Community College	Vaqueros	Glendale, California
Metro	Los Angeles Southwest College	Cougars	Los Angeles, California
Metro	Pasadena City College	Lancers	Pasadena, California
Metro	Santa Ana College	Dons	Santa Ana, California
Metro	West Los Angeles College	Wildcats	Culver City, California
Pacific	Antelope Valley College	Marauders	Lancaster, California
Pacific	Citrus College	Fighting Owls	Glendora, California
Pacific	Allan Hancock College	Bulldogs	Santa Maria, California
Pacific	Los Angeles Pierce College	Brahma Bulls	Woodland Hills, California
Pacific	Los Angeles Valley College	Monarchs	Valley Glen, California
Pacific	Santa Barbara City College	Vaqueros	Santa Barbara, California
Independent	Community Christian College	Saints	Redlands, California

== See also ==
- List of NJCAA Division I schools
- List of NJCAA Division II schools
- List of NJCAA Division III schools
