= Todd Hendricks =

American football player (born 1968)

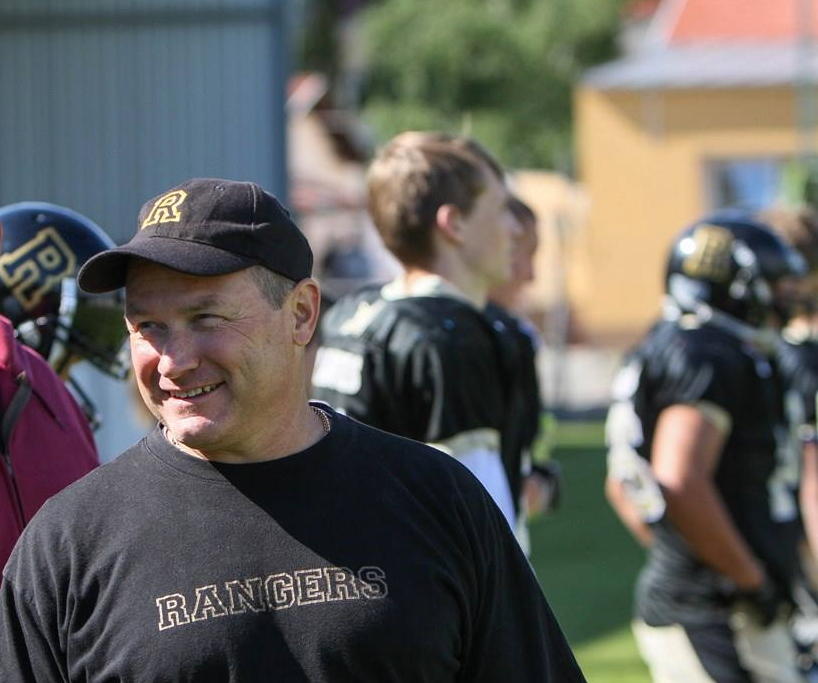
- Hendricks in 2013

No. 20
- Position: Wide receiver Running back

Personal information
- Born: Graceville, Minnesota
- Listed height: 5 ft 10 in (1.78 m)
- Listed weight: 195 lb (88 kg)

Career information
- High school: Alexandria Area High School
- College: University of Mary; Minnesota State Community and Technical College
- NFL draft: 1992: undrafted

Career history
- AFC Rangers (1993) (1995-1997); St. Paul Pigs (1999); AFC Rangers (2000, 2002); Vienna Knights (2008); Bern Grizzlies (2009); Thun Tigers (2010)

Awards and highlights
- Minnesota College Athletic Conference (MCAC) Hall of Fame Inductee (2015); National Minor League Football Hall of Fame Inductee (International player) (2004); Austrian Football League (AFL) MVP (1995); Austrian Football League Offensive Player of the Year (1995, 1996); European Federation of American Football (EFAF) All Europe (1995, 1996, 1997); Austrian Football League All Star (2000); Mid America Football League All Star (1999); Mid America Football League Champion (1999); All NDCAC Conference (1991); (J.C.-Gridwire) All-American (1988); All MCAC Conference (1988); All MCAC Conference track & field (1988); Minnesota State Football Coaches Section Coach of the Year (2003); Marshall Independent News Area High School Coach of Year (2003); Minnesota Vikings NFL High School Coach of the Week (2002); MCAC Conference Champions (2021)

Todd Hendricks (born August 13, 1968) is a former professional American football player who played wide receiver, running back, and return specialist. Hendricks played professionally for several seasons in the top level of the Austrian Football League (AFL) and European Football League. He later played in Switzerland's Nationalliga A (American football). Hendricks played college football at the University of Mary and Minnesota State Community & Technical College.

== Early life ==
Todd Hendricks played for Alexandria Area High School in Alexandria, Minnesota as a standout football, basketball and track athlete while earning several honors and awards. He earned WCCO All State honors in basketball, as well as all conference honors in three sports. Hendricks set a state record in football for punt return yards in a season and scored touchdowns in five different ways rushing, receiving, punt return, kickoff return and passed for a touchdown

== College career ==
Hendricks had to attend junior college because of the low ACT test score and grade point average. He earned all Minnesota College Athletic Conference honors in football and track (Sprints) and was named 1988 JC Gridwire All-American for his all purpose production rushing, receiving and kick returns at Minnesota State Community & Technical College-Fergus Falls. Hendricks was inducted to the Minnesota College Athletic Conference Hall of Fame in 2015.

On an athletic scholarship, Hendricks played the final two years of his college football career at the University of Mary Marauders. In his senior season, Hendricks earned All Conference honors as a starting receiver and ranked in the top five in the league in receiving. Hendricks helped lead the University of Mary to its first ever top 25 final national ranking in 1991 as a team captain. Hendricks returned to college and earned his bachelor's degree from the University of Mary in 2000.

== Professional career ==
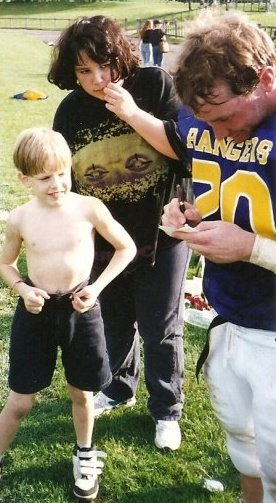
Hendricks signing autographs

Hendricks went undrafted and was unsigned after NFL tryouts. On December 28, 1992, Hendricks signed a Professional sports contract in the Austrian Football League (AFL) for the AFC Rangers of Vienna, Austria. He played all or parts of six seasons - 1993, 1995-1997, 2000, 2002 - for the AFC Rangers, reaching the Austrian Football League playoffs semi final four times, as well as the European Football League 1996 Eurobowl tournament playoffs. In 1995, Hendricks was honored as Austrian Football League MVP and Offensive Player of the Year. Hendricks scored a league record 20 touchdowns (14 receiving and 6 rushing) that season in eight games. He was named All Europe by the European Federation of American Football after the 1995, 1996, and 1997 seasons. He averaged 167 all purpose yards and over two touchdowns per game in his career in Europe, and is considered one of the all time greats to play in Austrian Football League and Europe.

In 1999, Hendricks played for the St Paul Pigs in Minnesota. Hendricks led the team in rushing and led the league in yards per reception, while also finishing second in the league in receiving touchdowns. He helped the Pigs to an undefeated season and won the league championship. Hendricks was named to the Mid America League and AFA all star teams. The Pigs franchise folded after its only season.

The next season, 2000, Hendricks returned to Europe and again played for the Rangers in the Austrian Football League and was named to the league all star team.

In 2008, Hendricks played and coached the last three games of the season for the Vienna Knights in Austria.

In 2009, Hendricks signed with the Bern Grizzlies of Switzerland's top level Nationalliga A (American football). Hendricks ruptured his Achilles' tendon ending his season early in the fifth game. Hendricks had scored eight touchdowns before the injury.

In 2010, he came back from the injury signing to play and coach with the Thun Tigers of Switzerland. Hendricks accounted for 19 total touchdowns in his final season as a player.

Hendricks was inducted to the US National Minor league football (gridiron) Hall of Fame in 2004. He has helped promote the game in the USA and Europe at schools, camps, and clinics.

== Coaching ==
Hendricks has coached in the US and Europe. He has a head coach record of 91 wins, 35 loss, 1 tie and four championships for Wabasso High School 2002-2004, Alexandria Mustangs, Bern Grizzlies in Switzerland, and Terni Steelers, Viterbo Pitbulls in Italy. He has also served twenty seasons as an assistant coach or coordinator at Osakis High School, Kimball High School, ACGC High School, Ridgewater College, Augsburg University, Thun Tigers in Switzerland, Cineplexx Blue Devils and AFC Rangers in Austria. In 2021, Hendricks was an assistant football coach at North Dakota State College of Science winning their first conference title in 22 years.
