= Mon-Dak Conference =

Junior college conference in Montana and North Dakota

Mon-Dak Athletic Conference
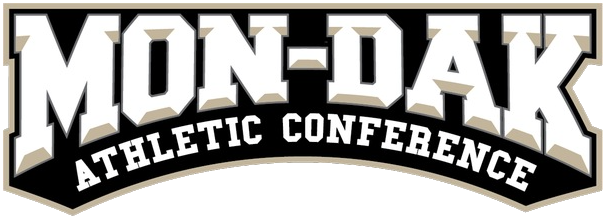
- Association: NJCAA
- Founded: 1974; 52 years ago
- Sports fielded: 18; men's: 10; women's: 8
- No. of teams: 7 (6 in 2026–27)
- Region: North Dakota – NJCAA Region 13
- Official website: mondakconference.com

The Mon-Dak Athletic Conference (MDAC) is a junior college conference for seven Tech and Community Colleges located in Montana and North Dakota, and it is a conference in the National Junior College Athletic Association (NJCAA). Conference championships are held in most sports and some individuals can be named to All-Conference and All-Academic teams.

== Member schools ==
=== Current members ===
The Mon-Dak currently has seven full members, all but one are public schools:

Institution	Location	Founded	Affiliation	Enrollment	Nickname	Joined
Dakota College at Bottineau	Bottineau, North Dakota	1906	Public (Note: Part of the North Dakota University System.)	655	Lumberjacks	1963
Dawson Community College	Glendive, Montana	1939	Public (Note: Part of the Montana University System.)	1,200	Buccaneers	1963
Lake Region State College	Devils Lake, North Dakota	1941	Public	1,657	Royals	1963
Miles Community College	Miles City, Montana	1939	Public	459	Pioneers	1963
North Dakota State College of Science (Note: North Dakota State College of Science will leave for the Minnesota College Athletic Conference (MCAC) after the 2026–27 academic year.)	Wahpeton, North Dakota	1903	Public	2,707	Wildcats	?
United Tribes Technical College	Bismarck, North Dakota	1969	Tribal college	375	Thunderbirds	?
Williston State College	Williston, North Dakota	1957	Public	855	Tetons	1963

=== Former members ===
The Mon-Dak had three former full members:

Institution	Location	Founded	Affiliation	Nickname	Joined (Note: Represents the calendar year when fall sports competition begins.)	Left (Note: Represents the calendar year when spring sports competition end.)	Subsequent conference	Current conference
Assumption Junior College	Richardton, North Dakota	1963	Catholic (Benedictine)	Astros	1963; 1970	1965; 1971	Discontinued athletics in 1965; Closed in 1971	
Bismarck State College	Bismarck, North Dakota	1939	Public	Mystics	1963	2025	Frontier Conference (NAIA)	
University of North Dakota – Ellendale	Ellendale, North Dakota	1899	Public	Dusties	1969	1971	Closed in 1971	

== See also ==
- Minnesota College Athletic Conference, also in NJCAA Region 13
