= Minnesota State University (disambiguation) =

Minnesota State University may refer to:

- Minnesota State University, Mankato, a public university in Mankato, Minnesota
- Minnesota State University Moorhead, a public university in Moorhead, Minnesota
- Minnesota State Colleges and Universities System, the largest higher education system of the state of Minnesota

== Fictional ==
- Minnesota State University, setting of Coach (TV series)

== See also ==
- University of Minnesota
