= Metro College Alliance =

Consortium of colleges

The Metro College Alliance (MCA) is a consortium of colleges in the Fargo-Moorhead area of the US states of Minnesota and North Dakota.

The consortium includes Concordia College, Minnesota State Community and Technical College, Minnesota State University Moorhead, North Dakota State College of Science, and North Dakota State University. Students at any participating institution may enroll in undergraduate courses offered at other institutions without having to undergo a separate application process or paying extra fees.

The Metro College Alliance began on January 1, 2025. The MCA replaced the Tri-College University consortium, which was active since 1970 and originally included only Concordia College, Minnesota State University Moorhead, and North Dakota State University.
