= University Center Rochester =

Coordinates: 44°00′59″N 92°25′45″W

- Type: Public
- Students: 7,534
- Location: Rochester, Minnesota, United States
- Website: http://www.roch.edu/

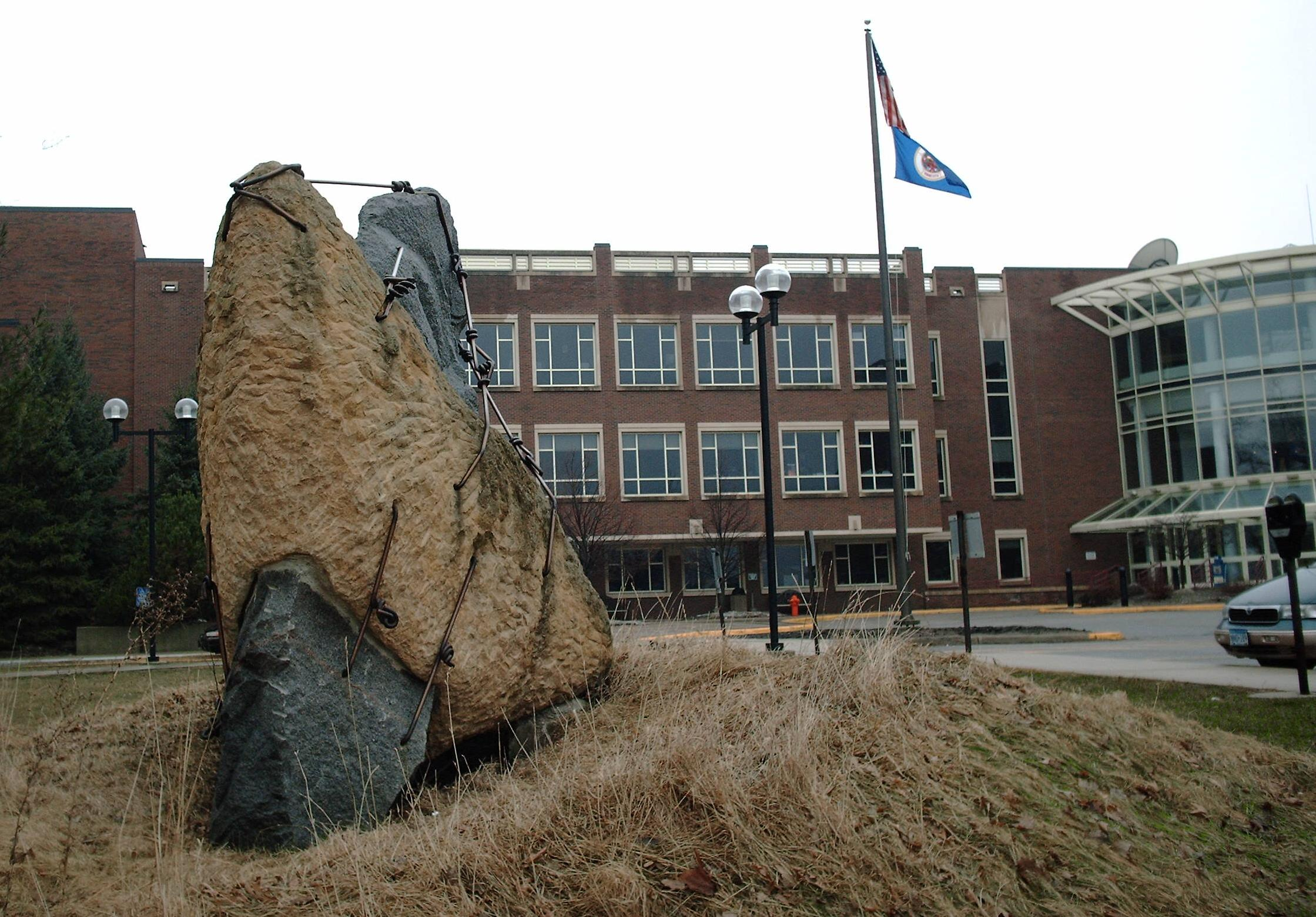
University Center Rochester.

University Center Rochester (UCR) was a higher education facility in Rochester, Minnesota. It was part of the Minnesota State Colleges and Universities System.

== History ==
UCR Partners were:

- Rochester Community and Technical College, (RCTC) was formed by the merger of Rochester Community College and Minnesota Riverland Technical College (now known as Heintz Center on the UCR Campus). The institution is currently offering degrees in Associate in Applied Science, Associate in Arts, Associate in Science, Associate of Fine Arts and several certificate programs. The college serves approximately 8,000 students in credit-based courses and 3,000 students in noncredit courses. RCTC offers 130 degree programs, with more than 300 online classes and 70 technical programs. Numerous other degree options are made available through the Minnesota Transfer Curriculum (MnTC). The campus is the oldest Community College in Minnesota, established in 1915 by Charles Horace Mayo. It offers ten varsity sports including football, women's volleyball, men's and women's basketball, women's softball, wrestling, men's and women's golf, baseball, and women's soccer.

Rochester Community and Technical College is also a Post Secondary Institution. This means that high school juniors and seniors can take courses at RCTC if they meet eligibility requirements. Admissions requirements include things such as a specific grade-point-average. Many students choose to participate in the Post Secondary Enrollment Option (PSEO) because the credit hours taken at the college are counted at the high school as well. If the student continues his or her education beyond high school graduation, the credits may transfer to another a university as college credit. PSEO is common among public school students, private school students, and homeschool students in the Rochester area.

- Winona State University-Rochester Center, (WSU-RC) is part of Winona State University. Winona State University-Rochester Center is a dynamic learning community that provides rigorous, high quality baccalaureate and graduate education opportunities to students. The presence of WSU Rochester Center's thirty-eight residential faculty located in Rochester is evidence of its strong commitment to serving the community and region. Winona State University-Rochester Center serves over 1,500 students annually in undergraduate and graduate education.

Located on the University Center Rochester Campus is a nationally recognized Regional Sports Center with more than 20 athletic fields as well as Rochester Regional Stadium featuring a season Bubble for year-round use. Both UCR partners are members of the Minnesota State Colleges and Universities System.

== Dissolution ==
The University Center Rochester (UCR) advisory board was dissolved in June 2015. Signage is currently in process of being replaced to reflect Rochester Community and Technical College.

== Notable alumni ==
- Logan Clark – wrestler; current mixed martial artist, formerly for the WEC and the Ultimate Fighting Championship
- Travis Wiuff – wrestler and football player; current professional mixed martial arts fighter with almost 100 career fights
