= Minnesota College Athletic Conference =

American college sports conference

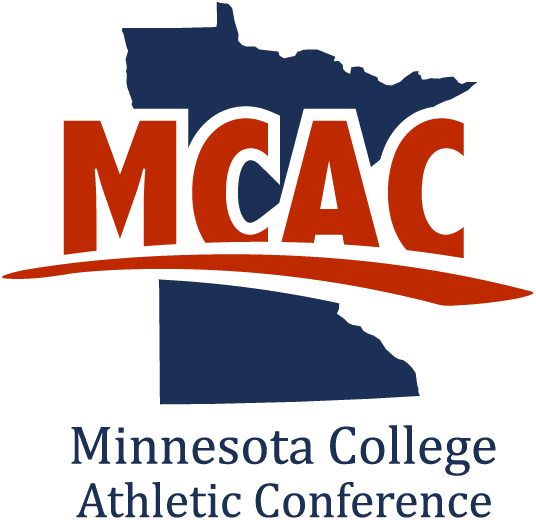
- Formerly: Minnesota Community College Conference
- Association: NJCAA
- Founded: 1967; 59 years ago
- Commissioner: Peter Watkins
- Sports fielded: 17; men's: 9; women's: 8
- No. of teams: 19 full + 5 associate members (20 full + 4 associate in 2027-28)
- Headquarters: Rochester, Minnesota
- Region: Minnesota, North Dakota and northern Wisconsin – NJCAA Region 13
- Website: mcacsports.org

The Minnesota College Athletic Conference (MCAC), formerly the Minnesota Community College Conference (MCCC), is a junior college collegiate athletic conference in the National Junior College Athletic Association (NJCAA). The 24 member institutions are located in the Midwest, including Minnesota, North Dakota and Wisconsin and they currently compete at the NJCAA Division III level in most sports. The MCAC was established in the fall of 1967.

== History ==
North Dakota State College of Science (NDSCS) and Dakota College at Bottineau joined the conference in football only beginning with the 2014 season.

In 2017, the MCAC partnered with USA High School Clay Target League to form the first two-year college varsity Clay target league. Clay target programs grew from five schools at the inception of the league to 12 programs in 2020.

Southwest Wisconsin Technical College joined the MCAC in the fall of 2018, competing in clay target and golf. Pine Technical and Community College and Lake Region State College joined the MCAC in the fall of 2018, competing in clay target. Century College joined the MCAC in the spring of 2019, competing in the NJCAA sports of baseball and women's volleyball. Century eliminated the women's softball team, women's soccer team and men's soccer team in 2018. NDSCS added clay target in the fall of 2019. Alexandria Technical & Community College joined the MCAC in the fall of 2019 and announced their intent to become a member of the NJCAA in the fall 2020.

Dakota College at Bottineau and Northland Community & Technical College announced the discontinuation of football after the fall of 2019.

== Member schools ==
=== Current members ===
The MCAC currently has 19 full members, all of which are public schools:

Institution	Location (Population)	Founded	Affiliation	Enrollment	Nickname	Joined	Colors	Varsity Teams	Division
Alexandria Technical and Community College	Alexandria, Minnesota (14,335)	1961	Public (Note: Part of the Minnesota State Colleges and Universities System.)	2,549	Legends	?		4	(Note: North Division volleyball member) (Note: Central Division baseball member) (Note: White Division clay target member)
Anoka-Ramsey Community College	Coon Rapids, Minnesota (61,476)	1965	Public	4,501	Golden Rams	?		7	(Note: South Division volleyball member) (Note: South Division men's basketball member) (Note: South Division women's basketball member) (Note: South Division softball member)
Central Lakes College	Brainerd, Minnesota (14,395)	1938	Public	6,000	Raiders	?		8	(Note: North Division men's basketball member) (Note: North Division women's basketball member) (Note: North Division softball member) (Note: Red Division clay target member)
Century College	White Bear Lake, Minnesota (24,883)	1967	Public	12,000	Wood Ducks	?		2	(Note: South Division baseball member)
Hibbing Community College	Hibbing, Minnesota (16,214)	1916	Public	700	Cardinals	?		6	(Note: North Division baseball member)
Itasca Community College	Grand Rapids, Minnesota (11,126)	1922	Public	1,400	Vikings	?		7	
Lake Superior College	Duluth, Minnesota (86,697)	1995	Public	5,800	IceHawks	?		6	
Mesabi Range College	Virginia, Minnesota (8,423)	1970	Public	1,700	Norse	?		7	
Minnesota State Community and Technical College	Fergus Falls, Minnesota (14,119)	1960	Public	6,464	Spartans	?		7	
Minnesota West Community & Technical College	Worthington, Minnesota (13,947)	1936	Public	?	Bluejays	?		7	(Note: Blue Division clay target member)
Northland Community & Technical College	Thief River Falls, Minnesota (8,749)	1949	Public	4,135	Pioneers	?		7	
Rainy River Community College	International Falls, Minnesota (6,424)	1967	Public	350	Voyageurs	?		5	
Ridgewater College	Willmar, Minnesota (19,610)	1965	Public	5,500	Warriors	?		7	
Riverland Community College	Austin, Minnesota (24,718)	1940	Public	4,900	Blue Devils	?		6	
Rochester Community & Technical College	Rochester, Minnesota (106,769)	1915	Public	8,000	Yellow Jackets	?		10	
St. Cloud Technical College	St. Cloud, Minnesota (65,842)	1948	Public	?	Cyclones	?		5	
Southwest Wisconsin Technical College (Southwest Tech)	Fennimore, Wisconsin (2,497)	1967	Public (Note: Part of the Wisconsin Technical College System.)	?	Chargers	?		2	
Vermilion Community College	Ely, Minnesota (3,460)	1922	Public	711	Ironmen & Ironwomen	?		6	
Western Technical College	La Crosse, Wisconsin (51,320)	1912	Public	8,000	Cavaliers	?		4	

=== Future member ===
The MCAC will have one future member, a public school.

Institution	Location	Founded	Affiliation	Enrollment	Nickname	Joining (Note: Represents the calendar year when fall sports competition begins.)	Colors	Current conference
North Dakota State College of Science (Note: North Dakota State College of Science (NDSCS) is currently a member of the MCAC for clay target and football.)	Wahpeton, North Dakota	1903	Public (Note: Part of the North Dakota University System.)	2,707	Wildcats	2027		Mon-Dak (NJCAA Region XIII)

=== Associate members ===
The MCAC currently has five associate members, all are public schools:

Institution	Location	Founded	Affiliation	Enrollment	Nickname	Joined	Colors	MCAC sport(s)	Current conference
Dakota College at Bottineau	Bottineau, North Dakota	1906	Public (Note: Part of the North Dakota University System.)	655	Lumberjacks	2014		clay target	Mon-Dak (NJCAA Region XIII)
Lake Region State College	Devils Lake, North Dakota	1941	Public	1,657	Royals	2019		clay target	Mon-Dak (NJCAA Region XIII)
North Dakota State College of Science (Note: NDSCS will become a full member of the MCAC starting with the 2027–28 academic year.)	Wahpeton, North Dakota	1903	Public	2,707	Wildcats	2014		clay target football	Mon-Dak (NJCAA Region XIII)
Pine Technical & Community College	Pine City, Minnesota	1965	Public (Note: Part of the Minnesota State Colleges and Universities System.)	2,020	?	?		clay target	none
Williston State College	Williston, North Dakota	1957	Public	855	Tetons	?		clay target	Mon-Dak (NJCAA Region XIII)

=== Former affiliate member ===
The MCAC has had one former affiliate member, which was a public school:

Institution	Location	Founded	Affiliation	Nickname	Joined (Note: Represents the calendar year when fall sports competition begins.)	Left (Note: Represents the calendar year when spring sports competition end.)	Colors	MCAC sport(s)	Current primary conference	Conference in former MCAC sport
Bismarck State College	Bismarck, North Dakota	1939	Public (Note: Part of the North Dakota University System.)	Mystics	?	2025		clay target, wrestling	Frontier Conference (NAIA)	

=== Former members ===
The MCAC has had at least eight former full members with all but two being public schools:

Institution	Location	Founded	Affiliation	Nickname	Joined	Left	Colors	Current conference
Bethany Lutheran College	Mankato, Minnesota	1927	Private (Lutheran ELS)	Vikings	?	?		Upper Midwest (NCAA Division III)
Fond du Lac Tribal and Community College	Cloquet, Minnesota	1987	Public (Note: Part of the Minnesota State Colleges and Universities System.)	Thunder	?	2023		Discontinued athletics
Golden Valley Lutheran College	Golden Valley, Minnesota	1919	Private (Lutheran)	?	?	?	?	Closed in 1985
Inver Hills Community College	Inver Grove Heights, Minnesota	1970	Public	?	?	?		Discontinued athletics
Normandale Community College	Bloomington, Minnesota	1968	Public	Lions	?	?		Discontinued athletics
North Hennepin Community College	Brooklyn Park, Minnesota	1966	Public	Norsemen	?	?		Discontinued athletics
University of Minnesota Crookston	Crookston, Minnesota	1966	Public (Note: Part of the University of Minnesota system.)	Golden Eagles	?	1995		Northern Sun (NCAA Division II)
University of Minnesota Waseca	Waseca, Minnesota	1971	Public (Note: Formerly part of the University of Minnesota system.)	Rams	?	?	?	Closed in 1992

== Sports ==
Teams which compete in the Minnesota College Athletic Conference.
Sport	Men's	Women's
Baseball	17	-
Basketball	17	17
Clay target	12	12
Football	9	-
Golf	3	-
Soccer	4	4
Softball	-	14
Volleyball	-	17
Wrestling	6	-

== Yearly football standings ==
2002 Minnesota Community College Conference football standings
	Conf.			Overall
Team	W		L	W		L
Northern Division
Northland (MN) x†y	5	–	0	9	–	3
Hibbing †	3	–	2	6	–	4
Rainy River	3	–	2	5	–	4
Mesabi Range	3	–	2	3	–	6
Itasca	1	–	4	1	–	8
Vermilion	0	–	5	3	–	6
Southern Division
Rochester C&T x†y$	4	–	0	11	–	1
Ridgewater †	3	–	1	7	–	3
Fergus Falls	2	–	2	4	–	5
Minnesota West	1	–	3	3	–	6
Central Lakes	0	–	4	1	–	8
Championship: Rochester C&T 24, Northland (MN) 14
$ – Conference champion; † – Conference playoff participant; y – Championship game participant

2003 Minnesota Community College Conference football standings
	Conf.			Overall
Team	W		L	W		L
Northern Division
Mesabi Range x†y	5	–	0	10	–	1
Hibbing †	5	–	1	5	–	4
Vermilion	3	–	2	5	–	4
Northland (MN)	2	–	3	4	–	5
Rainy River	1	–	4	1	–	8
Itasca	0	–	5	0	–	9
Southern Division
Rochester C&T x†y$	4	–	0	9	–	3
Minnesota West †	3	–	1	6	–	3
Ridgewater	2	–	2	6	–	3
Fergus Falls	1	–	3	4	–	5
Central Lakes	0	–	4	2	–	7
Championship: Rochester C&T 14, Mesabi Range 12
$ – Conference champion; † – Conference playoff participant; y – Championship game participant

2007 Minnesota College Athletic Conference football standings
	Conf.			Overall
Team	W		L	W		L
North Division
Vermilion x†	4	–	0	7	–	3
Rainy River †	3	–	1	6	–	4
Northland	2	–	2	6	–	3
Itasca	1	–	3	3	–	6
Mesabi Range	0	–	4	2	–	7
South Division
Rochester C&T x†y$	5	–	0	11	–	0
Central Lakes †y	4	–	1	7	–	4
Ridgewater	2	–	3	5	–	4
Minnesota State C&T	2	–	3	3	–	6
Minnesota West C&T	2	–	3	2	–	7
Fond du Lac	0	–	5	0	–	9
Championship: Rochester C&T 38, Central Lakes 18
$ – Conference champion; † – Conference playoff participant; y – Championship game participant

2008 Minnesota College Athletic Conference football standings
	Conf.			Overall
Team	W		L	W		L
North Division
Vermilion x†y	3	–	1	8	–	3
Mesabi Range x†y$	3	–	1	6	–	5
Fond du Lac	2	–	2	2	–	7
Itasca	0	–	4	1	–	8
Northland (MN) *	0	–	4	0	–	9
South Division
Minnesota West C&T x†	3	–	1	7	–	3
Central Lakes x†	3	–	1	7	–	3
Rochester C&T x	3	–	1	8	–	3
Ridgewater	1	–	3	5	–	4
Minnesota State C&T	0	–	4	2	–	7
Championship: Mesabi Range 6, Vermilion 0
$ – Conference champion; † – Conference playoff participant; y – Championship game participant; * – Northland forfeited all wins from the 2008 season

2015 Minnesota College Athletic Conference football standings
	Conf.			Overall
Team	W		L	W		L
Eastern Division
No. 6 Rochester C&T xy$	5	–	0	11	–	1
No. 17 Central Lakes	4	–	1	8	–	3
Itasca	2	–	3	5	–	4
Fond du Lac	2	–	3	4	–	5
Mesabi Range	1	–	4	2	–	6
Vermilion	1	–	4	1	–	7
Western Division
No. 13 NDSCS xy	5	–	0	8	–	3
Dakota College	3	–	2	6	–	4
Ridgewater	3	–	2	4	–	5
Minnesota West C&T	2	–	3	2	–	7
Northland (MN)	1	–	4	2	–	6
Minnesota State C&T	0	–	5	1	–	7
Championship: Rochester C&T 45, NDSCS 41
$ – Conference champion; x – Division champion/co-champions; y – Championship game participant; Rankings from NJCAA poll

2016 Minnesota College Athletic Conference football standings
	Conf.			Overall
Team	W		L	W		L
Eastern Division
No. 12 Central Lakes x†y$	5	–	0	11	–	1
Rochester C&T †	4	–	1	6	–	5
Itasca †	3	–	2	5	–	4
Vermilion †	2	–	3	2	–	7
Mesabi Range	1	–	4	1	–	7
Fond du Lac	0	–	5	2	–	6
Western Division
No. 20 NDSCS x†y	4	–	1	9	–	2
Ridgewater x†	4	–	1	6	–	4
Northland (MN) †	3	–	2	5	–	4
Dakota College †	2	–	3	4	–	5
Minnesota State C&T	2	–	3	3	–	5
Minnesota West C&T	0	–	5	1	–	7
Championship: Central Lakes 36, NDSCS 28
$ – Conference champion; † – Conference playoff participant; y – Championship game participant; Rankings from NJCAA poll

2017 Minnesota College Athletic Conference football standings
	Conf.			Overall
Team	W		L	W		L
Eastern Division
Central Lakes x†	4	–	1	8	–	2
Rochester C&T x†	4	–	1	6	–	3
Mesabi Range x†y	4	–	1	7	–	5
Vermilion †	1	–	4	3	–	6
Itasca	1	–	4	2	–	6
Fond du Lac	1	–	4	1	–	7
Western Division
Dakota College x†	5	–	0	8	–	2
Northland (MN) †y$	3	–	2	9	–	3
NDSCS †	3	–	2	5	–	4
Ridgewater †	2	–	3	3	–	6
Minnesota West C&T	1	–	4	2	–	6
Minnesota State C&T	1	–	4	1	–	7
Championship: Northland 68, Mesabi Range 35
$ – Conference champion; † – Conference playoff participant; y – Championship game participant

2018 Minnesota College Athletic Conference football standings
	Conf.			Overall
Team	W		L	W		L
Eastern Division
Central Lakes x†	6	–	0	7	–	3
Mesabi Range †	4	–	1	7	–	3
Itasca †	3	–	2	6	–	3
Rochester C&T	1	–	4	1	–	6
Vermilion	1	–	4	1	–	7
Fond du Lac †	1	–	5	3	–	6
Western Division
Northland (MN) x†y$	5	–	0	8	–	3
NDSCS †y	4	–	1	9	–	2
Dakota College †	3	–	2	5	–	4
Minnesota West C&T †	1	–	4	3	–	5
Minnesota State C&T	0	–	4	1	–	6
Ridgewater	0	–	2	0	–	4
Championship: Northland 34, NDSCS 10
$ – Conference champion; † – Conference playoff participant; y – Championship game participant; Ridgewater canceled their season with three games remaining, including two conference games

2019 Minnesota College Athletic Conference football standings
	Conf.			Overall
Team	W		L	W		L
East Division
Mesabi Range x†	5	–	0	7	–	2
Itasca †y	3	–	2	8	–	4
Rochester C&T †	3	–	2	6	–	3
Central Lakes x†y$	2	–	3	6	–	5
Vermilion	2	–	3	2	–	6
Fond du Lac	0	–	5	0	–	9
West Division
NDSCS x†	4	–	0	8	–	2
Minnesota West C&T †	2	–	2	6	–	4
Northland (MN) †	2	–	2	3	–	6
Dakota College †	1	–	2	3	–	5
Minnesota State C&T	0	–	3	1	–	6
Championship: Central Lakes 47, Itasca 19
$ – Conference champion; † – Conference playoff participant; y – Championship game participant

2021 Minnesota College Athletic Conference football standings
	Conf.			Overall
Team	W		L	W		L
No. 4 NDSCS †	7	–	0	9	–	1
No. 3 Itasca †y	6	–	1	9	–	1
Rochester C&T †	3	–	3	4	–	4
No. 5 Minnesota State C&T †y	3	–	4	6	–	4
Minnesota West C&T †	3	–	4	4	–	6
Central Lakes †	3	–	4	3	–	6
Vermilion †	2	–	4	2	–	6
Mesabi Range †	0	–	7	0	–	9
Championship: canceled
† – Conference playoff participant; y – Championship game participant; The 2021 MCAC Championship was canceled due to COVID-19 concerns and no conference champion was named

2022 Minnesota College Athletic Conference football standings
	Conf.			Overall
Team	W		L	W		L
No. 3 Minnesota State C&T †y	6	–	0	9	–	1
No. 1 NDSCS †y$^	5	–	1	9	–	2
Rochester C&T †	3	–	3	5	–	5
Central Lakes †	2	–	3	4	–	4
Mesabi Range †	2	–	4	2	–	6
Minnesota West C&T †	1	–	4	2	–	6
Vermilion †	0	–	4	0	–	5
Championship: NDSCS 19, Minnesota State C&T 0
$ – Conference champion; † – Conference playoff participant; y – Championship game participant; ^ – Red Grange Bowl participant; Rankings from NJCAA Division III poll

2023 Minnesota College Athletic Conference football standings
	Conf.			Overall
Team	W		L	W		L
No. 2 Rochester C&T †y$^	5	–	1	8	–	3
No. 3 NDSCS †y	4	–	1	8	–	3
No. 4 Mesabi Range †	4	–	2	5	–	4
Minnesota State C&T †	4	–	2	4	–	4
Central Lakes †	3	–	4	4	–	6
Vermilion †	1	–	5	1	–	6
Minnesota West C&T †	0	–	6	0	–	7
Championship: Rochester C&T 24, NDSCS 16
$ – Conference champion; † – Conference playoff participant; y – Championship game participant; ^ – Red Grange Bowl participant; Rankings from NJCAA Division III poll

2024 Minnesota College Athletic Conference football standings
	Conf.			Overall
Team	W		L	W		L
No. 3 NDSCS †y$	6	–	0	9	–	2
Rochester C&T †	4	–	2	5	–	5
Mesabi Range †y	3	–	3	4	–	4
Minnesota State C&T †	3	–	3	4	–	5
Vermilion †	3	–	3	3	–	4
Central Lakes †	1	–	5	1	–	5
Minnesota West C&T †	1	–	5	1	–	7
Championship: NDSCS 30, Mesabi Range 29
$ – Conference champion; † – Conference playoff participant; y – Championship game participant; Rankings from NJCAA Division III poll

2025 Minnesota College Athletic Conference football standings
	Conf.			Overall
Team	W		L	W		L
No. 3 Rochester C&T †y	6	–	0	8	–	2
No. 2 NDSCS †y$^	5	–	1	10	–	2
Minnesota West C&T †	5	–	2	5	–	4
Central Lakes †	3	–	4	3	–	7
Minnesota State C&T †	2	–	5	2	–	6
Mesabi Range †	1	–	5	1	–	5
Vermilion †	0	–	5	0	–	6
Championship: NDSCS 37, Rochester C&T 29
$ – Conference champion; † – Conference playoff participant; y – Championship game participant; ^ – Red Grange Bowl participant; Rankings from NJCAA Division III poll

== See also ==
- Mon-Dak Conference, also in NJCAA Region 13
