= Alexandria Technical and Community College =

Community college in Alexandria, Minnesota, U.S.

Coordinates: 45°52′23.11″N 95°22′18.9″W

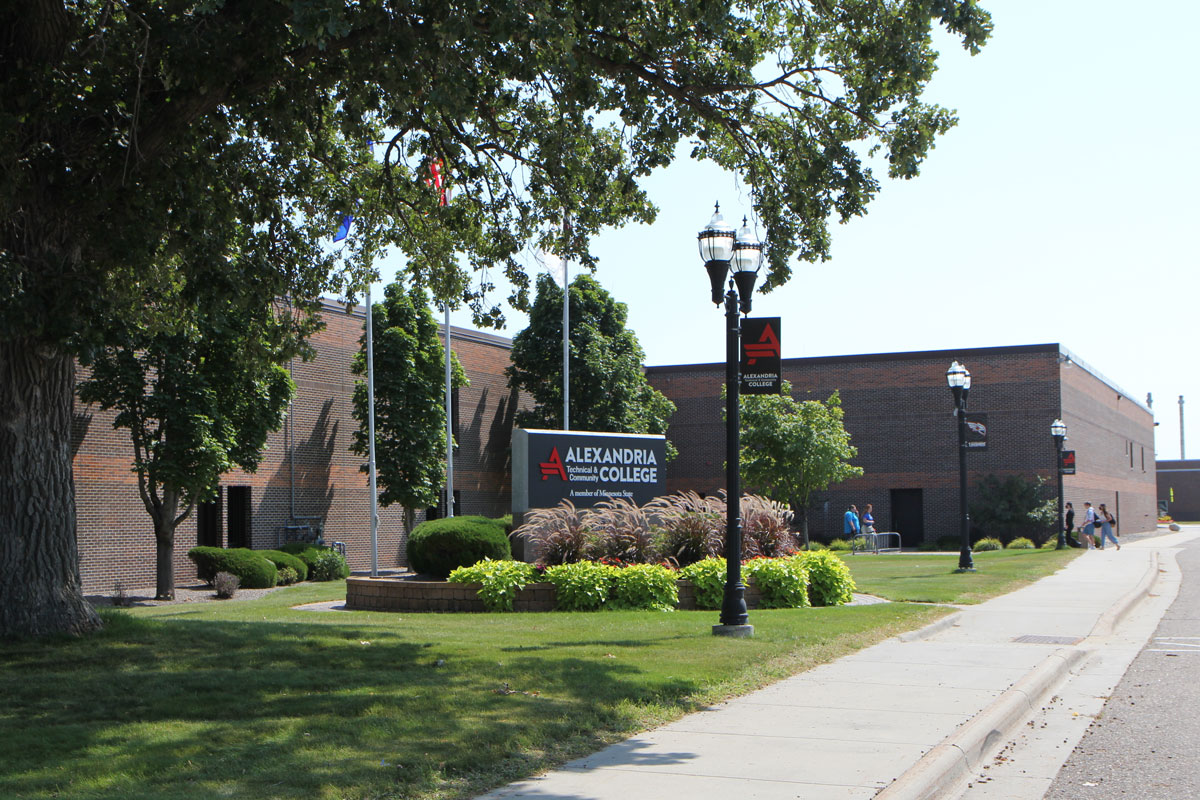
- Other names: Alexandria College; ATCC
- Motto: Be a Legend
- Type: Public community college
- Established: 1961
- Parent institution: Minnesota State Colleges and Universities
- President: Michael Seymour
- Students: c. 3,700, 41% full time
- Location: Alexandria, Minnesota, United States
- Colors: Red and black
- Mascot: Legends
- Website: www.alextech.edu

Alexandria Technical and Community College is a public community college in Alexandria, Minnesota, United States. It is part of the Minnesota State Colleges and Universities (Minnesota State) system. Approximately 3,700 students are enrolled, 41% of whom are enrolled full-time.

== Academics ==
Alexandria Technical and Community College offers nearly 50 academic programs including certificates, diplomas, Associate of Science and Associate of Applied Science degrees. Several Associate of Arts degrees and transfer pathways are also offered.

== Athletics ==
The college athletic teams, known as the Legends, compete in the Minnesota College Athletic Conference and are members of the National Junior College Athletic Association.

=== Co-ed athletics ===
- Archery
- Clay target league
- Competitive fishing
- eSports

=== Men's athletics ===
- Baseball
- Golf (Division II)
- Soccer

=== Women's athletics ===
- Golf (Division II)
- Soccer
- Volleyball

== Housing ==
Alexandria Technical and Community College has two student housing units adjacent to campus, operated by the Alexandria Technical and Community College Foundation. Foundation Hall, which opened in 2011, has 149 beds in a mix of two- and four-bedroom apartment-style units. J.A. Wedum Foundation Hall, due to open in the fall of 2024, has 150 beds in a mix of one- and two-bedroom apartment-style units.

== Notable alumni ==
- Janice Ettle, winner of many running races, including the 1985 Twin Cities Marathon
