= Northwest Technical College =

Public college in Bemidji, Minnesota, US

- Type: Public technical college
- Established: 1965; 61 years ago
- Parent institution: Minnesota State Colleges and Universities System
- President: John Hoffman (2022)
- Location: Bemidji, Minnesota, United States; 47°27′8″N 94°51′15″W
- Mascot: Beaver
- Website: www.ntcmn.edu

Northwest Technical College is a public technical college in Bemidji, Minnesota. It is part of the Minnesota State Colleges and Universities System. It was founded in 1965 as Bemidji Area Vocational Institute.

Northwest Technical College and Bemidji State University share overlapping administration, including the same President.
