= Granite Ridge Conference =

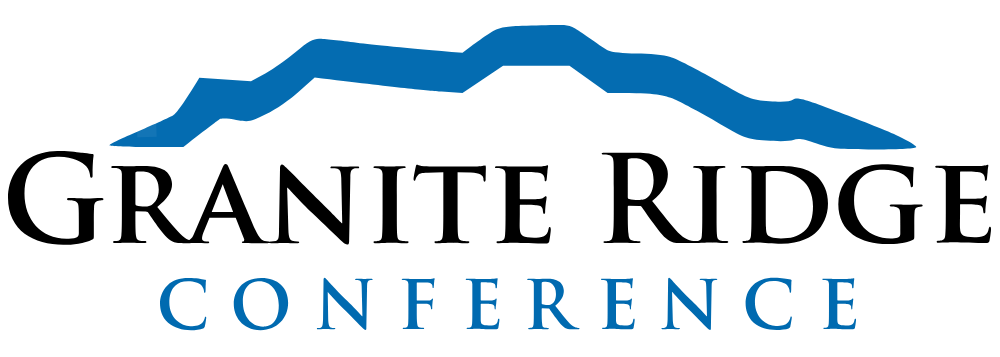
- Conference: Minnesota State High School League
- Founded: 2010
- No. of teams: Eight

The Granite Ridge Conference is a high school athletic conference that is sanctioned by the Minnesota State High School League. The conference was designed to create a better alignment for the involved schools. Currently, there are eight members. The largest school, Milaca High School has 784 students and the smallest school, Albany High School has 517.

== Granite Ridge Schools ==
School	Nickname	Enrollment	Previous conference	School Colors	Year joined
Albany	Huskies	517	West Central Conference	Purple/White	2012
Saint Cloud Cathedral	Crusaders	610	West Central Conference	Royal Blue/Gold	2010
Foley	Falcons	628	West Central Conference	Royal Blue/White	2010
Little Falls	Flyers	782	Central Lakes Conference	Purple/White	2010
Milaca	Wolves	784	West Central Conference	Red/Black	2010
Mora	Mustangs	734	West Central Conference	Royal Blue/White	2010
Pequot Lakes	Patriots	622	Mid-State Conference	Red/Blue/White	2023
Pierz	Pioneers	649	Central Minnesota Conference	Red/White/Black	2019

== Team Champions ==
=== Fall Sports ===
Season	Activity	Year	Team
Fall		2010 2011 2012 2013 2014 2015 2016	
	Cross Country-Boys		
	Cross Country-Girls		
	Football		
	Soccer - Boys		
	Soccer - Girls		
	Swimming/Diving		
	Tennis - Girls		
	Volleyball		
Winter			
	Basketball - Boys		
	Basketball - Girls		
	Dance - Competitive		
	Hockey - Boys		
	Hockey - Girls		
	Gymnastics		
	Wrestling		
Spring			
	Baseball		
	Golf - Boys		
	Golf - Girls		
	Lacrosse - Boys		
	Lacrosse - Girls		
	Softball		
	Tennis - Boys		
	Track & Field - Boys		
	Track & Field - Girls		

Cross Country
