= Minnesota State Colleges and Universities system =

Public university system in Minnesota

Minnesota State Colleges and Universities
- Type: Public university system
- Established: 1995
- Chancellor: Scott Olson
- Students: 300,000
- Location: St. Paul, Minnesota, U.S.
- Campus: 54 campuses
- Colors: Blue and white
- Website: minnstate.edu

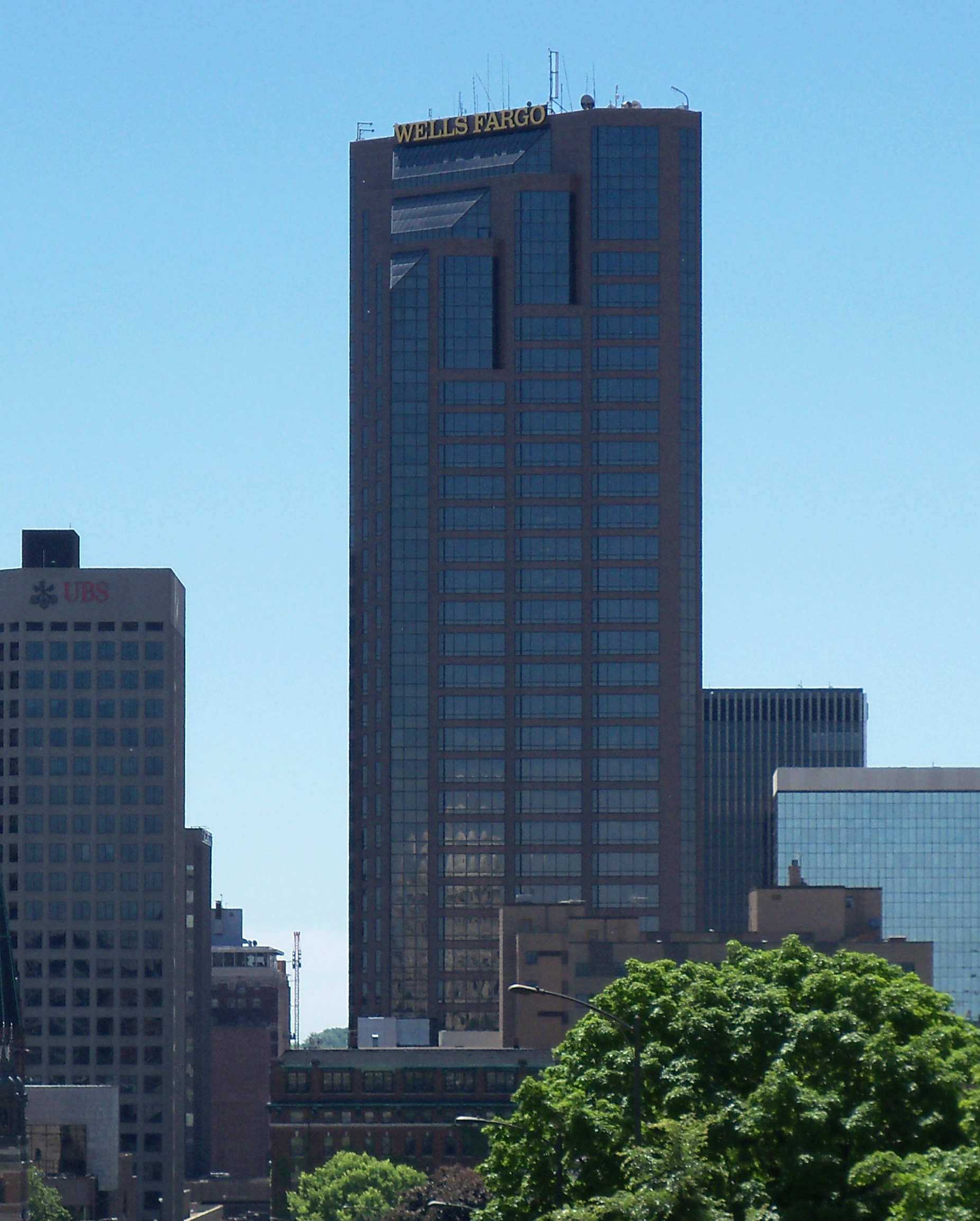
Wells Fargo Place, the headquarters of the Minnesota State system in St. Paul.

The Minnesota State Colleges and Universities system or Minnesota State, previously branded as MnSCU, comprises 26 state colleges and 7 state universities with 54 campuses throughout Minnesota. The system is the largest higher education system in Minnesota (separate from the University of Minnesota system) and the third largest in the United States, educating more than 300,000 students annually. It is governed by a 15-member board of trustees appointed by the governor, which has broad authority to run the system. The Minnesota State system office is located in the Wells Fargo Place building in Saint Paul, Minnesota.

In 2016, the Board of Trustees approved a rebranding of the system to the shortened Minnesota State. This change was met with criticism as this is also the nickname commonly attributed to Minnesota State University, Mankato. The change affected branding but did not alter the legal name of the organization that is identified in state statute. Commonly the system is now being referenced in media as the Minnesota State system, while the institution in Mankato is being referenced as Minnesota State.

== History ==
In 1991, the Minnesota Legislature issued legislation which founded the creation of the Minnesota State system. Through this process the then-existing Minnesota state university system, community college system and technical college system were combined into a single higher education system. This initially was to be accomplished by 1995 but due to statewide opposition it wasn't until 1997 that a Central Office was formed and individual institutions began to operate under centralized direction.

The members of the University of Minnesota could not be compelled by the legislature to be part of the new system because it had sued for independence in the form of constitutional autonomy from legislative oversight. This autonomy was affirmed by the Minnesota Supreme Court after the State of Minnesota was formed and was a response to lobbying demands from a newly formed Alumni Association of the University of Minnesota in the early 19th century.

This difference in independence and power has led to significant differences in the way in which the State system operates and educates students. Through this legislation the State system was given the ad-hoc role of educating all students outside of the doctoral research role that the University of Minnesota, Twin Cities campus provides. In addition, individual university and college members have, by comparison, significantly smaller endowments, and receive less funding from the state government of Minnesota than comparable members of the University of Minnesota system. An appropriation by the state of Minnesota was supposed to cover 66% of the cost to educate students, and as of 2014 the state provides about 50%.

=== List of Chancellors ===
1. Judith Eaton 1995-1997
2. Morris Anderson 1997-2001
3. John McCormick 2001-2011
4. Steven Rosenstone 2011-2017
5. Devinder Malhotra 2017-2023
6. Scott Olson 2023-

== Operations ==
Minnesota State offers a wide range of collegiate programs from associates degrees to applied doctorates. All of the system's two-year community and technical colleges have an open admissions policy, which means that anyone with either a high school diploma or equivalent degree may enroll. The system also runs an online collaborative called Minnesota Online, which is a gateway to the online course offerings of Minnesota State. More than 150 academic programs are available completely or predominantly online. About 93,300 students took online courses during the 2009–2010 academic year.

The economic impact of the Minnesota State system is estimated to be $8 billion per year, with a return of twelve dollars for every dollar invested.

Tuition at Minnesota State is lower than tuition at the University of Minnesota, private universities, or private trade schools. More than 80 percent of graduates stay in Minnesota to work or continue their education. The job-placement rate based on the last available data at two-year colleges is 88.0 percent in 2006, meaning that 88.0 percent of graduates find jobs in their chosen fields.

The Minnesota State has not designated an official flagship institution; however, Minnesota State University, Mankato and St. Cloud State University have been referred to as the system flagship at various points.

== Member universities and colleges ==
Location of four-year state universities in Minnesota.

Four-year state universities
| Name | Location | Athletics |
|---|---|---|
| Bemidji State University | Bemidji | NSIC (NCAA Division II) |
| Metropolitan State University | St. Paul | N/A |
| Minnesota State University, Mankato | Mankato | NSIC (NCAA Division II) |
| Minnesota State University Moorhead | Moorhead | NSIC (NCAA Division II) |
| Southwest Minnesota State University | Marshall | NSIC (NCAA Division II) |
| St. Cloud State University | St. Cloud | NSIC (NCAA Division II) |
| Winona State University | Winona | NSIC (NCAA Division II) |

Location of two-year state colleges in Minnesota.

Two-year community and technical colleges
| Name | Location |
|---|---|
| Alexandria Technical and Community College | Alexandria |
| Anoka Technical College | Anoka |
| Anoka-Ramsey Community College | Cambridge; Coon Rapids |
| Central Lakes College | Brainerd; Staples |
| Century College | White Bear Lake; Mahtomedi |
| Dakota County Technical College | Rosemount |
| Fond du Lac Tribal and Community College | Cloquet |
| Hennepin Technical College | Brooklyn Park; Eden Prairie |
| Inver Hills Community College | Inver Grove Heights |
| Lake Superior College | Duluth |
| Minneapolis College | Minneapolis |
| Minnesota North College | Hibbing; Itasca; Mesabi Range - Eveleth; Mesabi Range - Virginia; Rainy River; Vermilion |
| Minnesota State College Southeast | Red Wing; Winona |
| Minnesota State Community and Technical College | Detroit Lakes; Fergus Falls; Moorhead; Wadena |
| Minnesota West Community and Technical College | Canby; Granite Falls; Jackson; Pipestone; Worthington |
| Normandale Community College | Bloomington |
| North Hennepin Community College | Brooklyn Park |
| Northland Community & Technical College | East Grand Forks; Thief River Falls |
| Northwest Technical College | Bemidji |
| Pine Technical and Community College | Pine City |
| Ridgewater College | Hutchinson; Willmar |
| Riverland Community College | Austin; Albert Lea; Owatonna |
| Rochester Community and Technical College | Rochester |
| St. Cloud Technical and Community College | St. Cloud |
| Saint Paul College | St. Paul |
| South Central College | North Mankato; Faribault |

== Enrollment and state policy initiatives ==
Minnesota has been experiencing a net loss of college students to institutions out of state since 2001. Minnesota’s net migration of students has been consistently negative, with a net migration of -7,886 reported for the 2022-23 school year. At postsecondary institutions across the state, a trend of declining enrollment has been present for the past 14 years. This downward trend has been particularly intense within Minnesota State two and four-year colleges and universities between 2018 and 2022. Following the COVID-19 pandemic, the Minnesota state government took measures to reinvest into higher education. This included a $650 million investment into the Minnesota Office of Higher Education incorporated into the One Minnesota Budget signed into law by Minnesota Governor Tim Walz in May 2023. The North Star Promise Scholarship Program was amongst the many inclusions of the Higher Education portion of the One Minnesota Budget. The program covers the cost of tuition and fees for Minnesota resident students with a family adjusted gross income (AGI) of less than $80,000 who attend a public or tribal institution for higher education.

The 2023-24 academic year yielded a long absent positive trend of undergraduate enrollment within Minnesota’s post secondary institutions: a 1.2% increase estimated by the National Student Clearinghouse. The North Star Promise Scholarship Program is set to take effect for the fall 2024 semester across public Minnesota colleges and universities. Once in effect, the Minnesota Office of Higher Education has estimated a positive financial impact, as it relates to higher education, for more than 15,000 students statewide. Other initiatives from the Minnesota Office of Higher Education include Direct Admissions Minnesota. This program works to streamline the admissions process for high school seniors into public Minnesota post secondary institutions for those interested. Nearly all schools part of the Minnesota State Colleges and Universities system participate in the Direct Admissions program.
