= North Dakota University System =

Public university system in North Dakota

North Dakota University System locations.
Black: Research Universities; Red: Regional Universities; Yellow: Community Colleges.

The North Dakota University System (NDUS) is the public system of higher education and policy coordination entity in the U.S. state of North Dakota. The system includes all public institutions in the state including two research universities, four regional universities and five community colleges. Community colleges are termed simply colleges in the NDUS system. This convention is unique in that it is one of the minority of states that follow this terminology. The mission of NDUS is to enhance the quality of life for all those served by the NDUS as well as the economic and social vitality of North Dakota.

The NDUS's policy making body is the North Dakota State Board of Higher Education, based in Bismarck. The system was officially organized in 1990.

== Member institutions ==
=== Research universities ===
- North Dakota State University in Fargo
- University of North Dakota in Grand Forks

=== Universities ===
- Dickinson State University in Dickinson
- Mayville State University in Mayville
- Minot State University in Minot
- Valley City State University in Valley City

=== Community colleges ===
- Bismarck State College in Bismarck
- Lake Region State College in Devils Lake
- Dakota College at Bottineau in Bottineau
- North Dakota State College of Science in Wahpeton
- Williston State College in Williston
