= Pine Technical and Community College =

Community college in Pine City, Minnesota, U.S.

Coordinates: 45°49′6″N 92°58′6″W

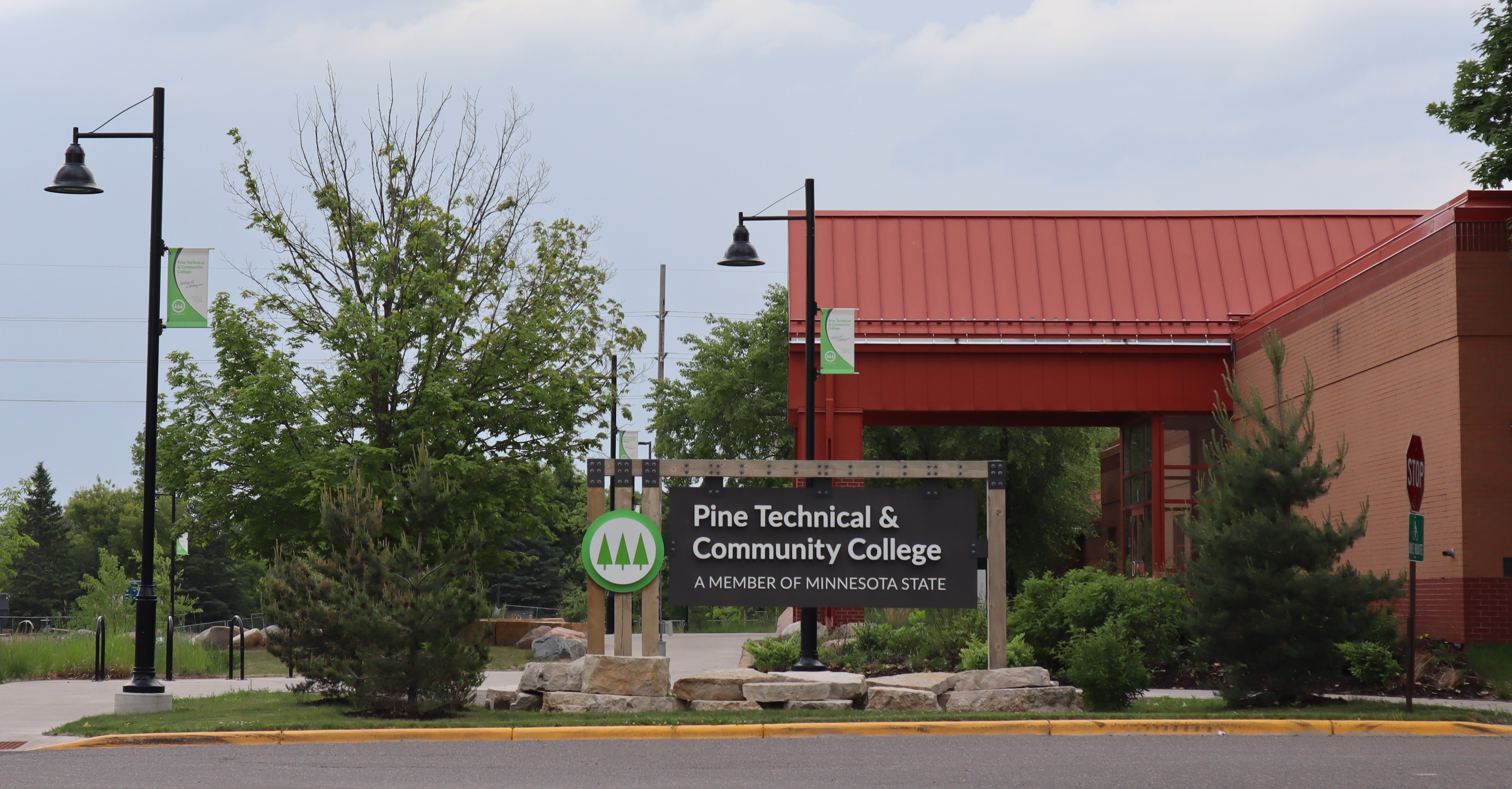
- Type: Public community college
- Parent institution: Minnesota State Colleges and Universities System
- President: Joe Mulford
- Administrative staff: 150
- Students: 2,020
- Location: Pine City, Minnesota, United States
- Website: www.pine.edu

Pine Technical and Community College (PTCC), formerly Pine Technical College, is a public community college in Pine City, Minnesota. PTCC is a member of the Minnesota State Colleges and Universities System, which comprises 31 state universities and community and technical colleges in Minnesota.

== History ==
Established in 1965 as the 24th Minnesota area vocational-technical school with a focus on providing occupational, educational and technical expertise to students, the local Pine City School Board of Education worked closely with the Minnesota Department of Education from 1963 to 1965 to obtain necessary approvals needed to establish an area vocational-technical school in Pine City. During this period, Pine City and Mora were cities both considered as sites. The department originally chose Mora as the site for the vocational-technical school; however, after a visit to the Pine City public schools by the Commissioner of the Minnesota Department of Education, Pine City was designated as the site for the new area vocational-technical school.

Originally housed in various locations throughout Pine City, the college's main 22,500-square-foot (2,090 m^{2}) building was not built until 1966. The first programs offered at Pine City Area Vocational-Technical School in 1966 were in four program areas that offered occupational diplomas in auto mechanics, welding, drafting and secretarial/business. Students did not pay tuition to attend the vocational-technical school.

In 1989, the college opened the Employment and Training Center, which manages a variety of childcare, training and support programs for the five counties serving East Central Minnesota. In 1994, the college sought and received accreditation through the North Central Association of Colleges and Schools, and in 1996, the college was established as a state technical college. Today, Pine Technical College retains its NCACS accreditation, is a member of the Minnesota State Colleges and Universities system, serves more than 1,000 students and offers programs/degrees in a variety of career fields.

In 2014, Minnesota State Colleges and Universities System deemed Pine Technical College community college status and the college announced it would add programs and offer an Associate in Arts degree. The name was changed to Pine Technical and Community College.

While enrollment at Minnesota's higher education institutions has been trending downward, Pine Technical and Community College showed a 20% gain in enrollment from 2010 to 2018.
