= Williston State College =

Community college in Williston, North Dakota, US

Coordinates: 48°9′27.9″N 103°36′53.4″W

Williston State
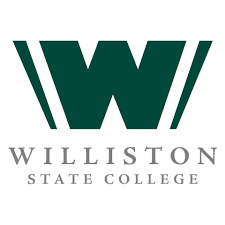
- Motto: Where the people make the difference.
- Type: Public community college
- Established: 1961; 65 years ago
- Parent institution: North Dakota University System
- Academic affiliations: Space-grant
- President: Bernell Hirning
- Faculty: 80
- Administrative staff: 70
- Students: 1,132
- Location: Williston, North Dakota, United States
- Colors: Green and White
- Nickname: Tetons
- Sporting affiliations: Mon-Dak Conference, NJCAA, ACHA
- Website: www.willistonstate.edu

Williston State College (WSC) is a public community college in Williston, North Dakota. It is part of the North Dakota University System. Founded in 1961, WSC provides general, vocational, and technical education. For most of its history the college has worked in close connection with the University of North Dakota. It was originally the University of North Dakota-Williston (UND-W).

== Academics ==
WSC offers transfer programs leading to Associate in Arts (AA) and Associate in Science (AS) degrees. Students can complete the first two years of many majors and transfer with junior status to most four-year colleges and universities.

In addition, the Associate in Applied Science (AAS) degree, the Program Certificate (PC), and the Certificate of Completion (COC) are awarded to students completing career-technical programs. Students receiving career-technical training may continue at a four-year college or university, earning an advanced degree.

== Athletics ==
The athletic teams for Williston State College are nicknamed the "Tetons". Williston State College has 5 teams that compete in the National Junior College Athletic Association (NJCAA), those sports are Men's and Women's Basketball, Women's Volleyball, Men's Baseball, and Women's Fastpitch Softball which they compete in the Mon-Dak Conference. WSC also has Men's Hockey which competes at the American Collegiate Hockey Association (ACHA) D2 level as an independent team in the West Region.

== Housing ==
WSC has on-campus housing available for students. Frontier Hall is the main on-campus living for students who attend Williston State College. The Tetons also have Nelson Hall, Abramson Hall, and Manger Hall.
