= Minnesota North College – Rainy River =

College in Minnesota, United States

- Type: Public community college
- Active: 1967–Rainy River Community College
- Parent institution: Minnesota State Colleges and Universities System
- Students: 350
- Location: International Falls, Minnesota, U.S. 48.5943°N 93.4276°W
- Colors: Red, white, black
- Nickname: Voyageurs
- Sporting affiliations: NJCAA, MCAC, ACHA
- Website: minnesotanorth.edu

Minnesota North College – Rainy River, previously Rainy River Community College, is a public community college in International Falls, Minnesota. In 2022, the board of trustees of the Minnesota State Colleges and Universities merged the college with several others into a single institution called Minnesota North College.

== Academics ==
The campus offers the Associate in Arts degree, Associate in Science degree, and certificate programs. It also provides several programs shared with other colleges.

== Athletics ==
As part of Minnesota North College, a member of the Minnesota College Athletic Conference (MCAC) National Junior College Athletic Association (NJCAA), Voyageur Athletics include baseball, softball, men's basketball, women's basketball, and volleyball.

The Rainy River men's basketball team earned their first regional title since 1991 and a trip to the NJCAA DIII tournament in 2024 by edging Riverland Community College.

While the school was forced to cut its programs, Rainy River has a storied history in the sport of ice hockey. The men's hockey team won two NJCAA national championships in 1977 and 1999. The women's team, meanwhile, won three American Collegiate Hockey Association national titles in 2008, 2009 and 2011.

== Student activities ==
The campus offers an 18-hole disc golf course, a lighted cross country trail for skiing and hiking, and several water features including ponds, decks, and walkways. The campus has an active Phi Theta Kappa honor society and Student Senate. They also hold different events during the year including Awareness Week, and Diversity Week.

== Library ==
The campus library has 20,000 books and an online public access catalog available 24 hours a day. There are 70 computers available on campus for general student use. There is a staffed computer lab providing training of computers, technology, software, and the Internet.
