= St. Cloud Technical and Community College =

Community college in St. Cloud, Minnesota, U.S.

St. Cloud Technical & Community College
- Type: Public Community College
- Established: 1948
- Affiliations: Minnesota College Athletic Conference
- President: Lori Kloos
- Location: St. Cloud, Minnesota, U.S. 45°34′43″N 94°10′32″W
- Nickname: Cyclones
- Sporting affiliations: NJCAA
- Website: www.sctcc.edu

St. Cloud Technical and Community College is a public technical college and community college in St. Cloud, Minnesota, United States. Founded in 1948 and formerly called St. Cloud Technical College and St. Cloud Vocational Technical College (and known as "Vo-Tech"), it is part of the Minnesota State Colleges and Universities system. The college grants Associate of Arts, Associate of Science, and Associate of Applied Science degrees in several majors; it also grants certificates and advanced technical certificates.

== Athletics ==
SCTCC's athletics teams, nicknamed the Cyclones, play at the National Junior College Athletic Association (NJCAA) level. All the teams compete in South Division of the Minnesota College Athletic Conference (MCAC).

Men's	Women's
Basketball	Basketball
Baseball	Softball
	Volleyball
