= Anoka–Ramsey Community College =

Public college in Cambridge and Coon Rapids, Minnesota, US

- Type: Public community college
- Established: 1965
- Parent institution: Minnesota State Colleges and Universities System
- President: Kent Hanson
- Students: 4,501
- Location: Coon Rapids and Cambridge, Minnesota, United States; 45.1727°N 93.3526°W
- Campus: Suburban, 103 acres (42 ha)
- Colors: Blue & yellow
- Nickname: Golden Rams
- Sporting affiliations: NJCAA, Minnesota College Athletic Conference
- Website: www.anokaramsey.edu

Anoka–Ramsey Community College is a public community college in Cambridge and Coon Rapids, Minnesota. Founded in 1965, the college annually serves more than 12,500 students as they pursue associate degrees that transfer as the first two years of a bachelor's degree, as well as certificate programs. Anoka–Ramsey Community College is a member of the Minnesota State Colleges and Universities System. The college also focuses on providing professional development and continuing education programs for working adults. Over 5,570 registrants enroll in these courses each year.

== History ==
Beginning in 1965 with 600 students in a wing of Centennial High School in Circle Pines, Anoka–Ramsey Community College has grown considerably. In 1967 the college moved to the current Coon Rapids Campus of approximately 103 acres (42 ha). The Cambridge Campus opened in 1978 and has shown consistent growth in enrollment and facilities. In addition, students may complete many Anoka-Ramsey college courses at off-site locations throughout neighboring communities.

== Location ==
Anoka–Ramsey Community College Coon Rapids Campus is located on the banks of the Mississippi River twenty miles (32 km) north of downtown Minneapolis at 11200 Mississippi Blvd. NW, in Coon Rapids, Minnesota. The Cambridge Campus is located just off west Highway 95 on the Rum River at 300 Spirit River Dr. S, Cambridge.

In the 1980s the Minnesota Japanese School, a weekend supplementary school for Japanese people, formerly held its classes at the Coon Rapids campus, using eleven of its classrooms.

== Accreditation ==
Anoka–Ramsey Community College is accredited by the Higher Learning Commission.

The associate degree Registered Nursing program is accredited by the National League for Nursing Accrediting Commission. The Commission on Accreditation in Physical Therapy Education (CAPTE) of the American Physical Therapy Association (APTA) nationally accredits the Physical Therapist Assistant program.

The Associate of Fine Arts in Music program is fully accredited by the National Association of Schools of Music (NASM).
