= Dakota College at Bottineau =

Community college in Bottineau, North Dakota, U.S.

- Type: Community college
- Established: 1906; 120 years ago as North Dakota State School of Forestry
- President: Steven Shirley
- Faculty: 32
- Students: 1,204
- Location: Bottineau, North Dakota, U.S. 48°49′57″N 100°26′29″W
- Colors: Forest Green, White
- Nicknames: Lumberjacks (men); Ladyjacks (women)
- Sporting affiliations: National Junior College Athletic Association (NJCAA), Division II; MonDak Conference; ACHA Division II
- Mascot: Axel the Lumberjack
- Website: www.dakotacollege.edu

Dakota College at Bottineau (DCB) is a public community college in Bottineau, North Dakota. Founded in 1906 (120 years ago) as a forestry school, Dakota College's 35-acre campus is home to the North Dakota Forest Service Headquarters. It offers Associate of Applied Science (AAS), Associate of Arts (AA), and Associate of Science (AS) degrees with a focus on general education requirements for degree completion; AA and AS degrees are transferable to bachelor's degree programs at many colleges and universities. Diploma, certificate, and certificate of completion programs are also offered.

== History ==
DCB was founded in 1906 as the North Dakota State School of Forestry in Old Main, the campus' first and then-only building. In 1968, the school became affiliated with North Dakota State University and changed its name to North Dakota State University-Bottineau Branch. In 1996, the school became affiliated with Minot State University, becoming Minot State University-Bottineau Campus. It received its present name on August 1, 2009.

== Admission ==
DCB is an open-enrollment campus for high school and GED graduates.

== Athletics ==
DCB's varsity athletic teams compete as the Lumberjacks (men's teams) and Ladyjacks (women's teams). DCB is part of the Mon-Dak Conference as part of the NJCAA. DCB athletic teams include Men's Baseball, Men's Basketball, Men's Ice Hockey, Women's Basketball, Women's Ice Hockey, Women's Fast-Pitch Softball and Women's Volleyball. The Dakota College at Bottineau Lumberjacks men's ice hockey team has won the NJCAA national championship 10 times.

== Notable alumni ==
- Dustin Penner, professional hockey player
