= Fond du Lac Tribal and Community College =

Public tribal college in Cloquet, Minnesota, US

Fond du Lac Tribal & Community College
- Former names: Fond du Lac Community College Center (1987-1989)
- Type: Public tribal land-grant community college
- Established: 1987
- Parent institution: Minnesota State Colleges and Universities System
- Academic affiliations: American Indian Higher Education Consortium; World Indigenous Nations Higher Education Consortium; Space-grant
- President: Anita Hanson
- Students: 1,976 (Fiscal Year 2021)
- Address: 2101 14th St., Cloquet, Minnesota, U.S. 46.6903°N 92.4492°W
- Campus: Rural, small city, metropolitan area
- Colors: Orange & black
- Website: www.fdltcc.edu

Fond du Lac Tribal and Community College (FDLTCC) is a public tribal land-grant community college in Cloquet, Minnesota. FDLTCC is located within the Twin Ports area of Duluth, Minnesota and Superior, Wisconsin in northeastern Minnesota. The college is a member of Minnesota State, the American Indian Higher Education Consortium, and the World Indigenous Nations Higher Education Consortium. FDLTCC was Minnesota's first tribal college. FDLTCC is the only college in the nation both established as a tribal college under federal law and operating as part of a state-funded higher education system.

== History ==
The Fond du Lac Band of Lake Superior Chippewa Indians recognized that post-secondary education was crucial to the tribe's comprehensive education planning in 1979. Beginning in 1985, Mesabi Community College began holding classes at the Tribal Ojibwe School on the Fond du Lac Indian Reservation. The Fond du Lac Reservation Business Committee provided the leadership necessary to unify tribal, state, and community support for a community college that would serve both the Fond du Lac Band and surrounding community areas. Following a feasibility study of higher education needs of the American Indian and non-Indian people in Carlton County area, recommendation was made for a joint venture between the Fond du Lac tribal government and the Arrowhead Community College Region (ACCR).

In 1987, the Fond du Lac Higher Education Center Task Force was formed. The task force's efforts resulted in the creation of the Fond du Lac Community College Center, a Mesabi Range Community College extension located in the Cloquet, Minnesota Garfield Community Center building. In 1989, the State of Minnesota appropriated $6,990,000 for the founding of FDLTCC. A new community college site was built and opened to students in 1992. The college's first president Jack Briggs envisioned a college founded to support tribal cultures, tribal values, and tribal spirituality but also committed to equally serve and welcome non-tribal students.

The college was designated a land-grant college in 1994 alongside 31 other tribal colleges. The following year, the Minnesota Community College Board fully funded FDLTCC and the institution became independent from ACCR. In 1996, the State of Minnesota reorganized its higher education institutions and FDLTCC became a member of Minnesota State Colleges and Universities.

In May 1999, after an intensive self-study process and site visit evaluation the college received its first ten-year accreditation as a stand-alone college by the North Central Association of Colleges and Schools.

In 2012, FDLTCC celebrated its 25th anniversary. Celebrations included a special premiere of Extraordinary: Celebrating 25 Years, a video commemorating the college's history through the voices of those who were among the original “dreamers” and those who were among the college's graduates. The 22-minute movie won silver in the Special Video Production category at the national 2013 Collegiate Advertising Awards.

== Accreditation ==
=== Higher Learning Commission ===
FDLTCC was accredited as part of ACCR and Mesabi Range Technical College until 1997. In 1995, FDLTCC was granted candidacy for accreditation as a separate entity. Since 1997, FDLTCC has been accredited by the Higher Learning Commission.

=== World Indigenous Nations Higher Education Consortium ===
In 2017, FDLTCC became a fully accredited member of the World Indigenous Nations Higher Education Consortium (WINHEC). WINHEC was established in August 2002 at the World Indigenous Peoples Conference on Education in Alberta, Canada. WINHEC accreditation performs a number of important functions including the validation of credibility on the part of the public being served and encouragement of efforts toward maximum educational effectiveness. The accrediting process requires schools as well as other educational institutions and programs to examine their own goals, operations, and achievements in light of being committed to building partnerships that restore and retain indigenous spirituality, cultures and languages, homelands, social systems, economic systems and self-determination. WINHEC is not recognized by the U.S. Department of Education as an accreditor.

== Athletics ==
FDLTCC was a member of the Minnesota College Athletic Conference (MCAC). The college fielded teams in basketball and volleyball, however discontinued all athletics after the 2023 school year due to low participation, attendance, and budget constraints.

== Student life ==
Undergraduate demographics as of Fall 2023
Race and ethnicity	Total
White	53%
American Indian/Alaska Native	28%
Two or more races	11%
Hispanic	5%
Black	2%
Unknown	1%
Economic diversity
Low-income (Note: The percentage of students who received an income-based federal Pell grant intended for low-income students.)	66%
Affluent (Note: The percentage of students who are a part of the American middle class at the bare minimum.)	34%
