= Northland Community & Technical College =

Public college in Minnesota, US

- Type: Public community college
- President: Shari Olson
- Students: 4,135
- Location: Thief River Falls and East Grand Forks, Minnesota, United States; 48°7′30″N 96°9′44″W
- Colors: Blue and Red
- Mascot: Pioneers
- Website: www.northlandcollege.edu

Northland Community & Technical College (Northland) is a public community college with campuses in Thief River Falls and East Grand Forks, Minnesota. Northland also has an aerospace site in Thief River Falls and a satellite site in Roseau, Minnesota. Northland offers certificates, diplomas, transfer courses, two-year degrees (A.A.S., A.S., A.A.) in more than 80 areas of study, workforce training and education programs. The two campuses serve over 4,000 full and part-time students. The college also has an NJCAA athletics program with the nickname Pioneers and are a member of the Minnesota College Athletic Conference. Northland is a member of Minnesota State Colleges and Universities system or Minnesota State System, the fourth-largest system of two-year colleges and four-year universities in the United States, and is accredited by the Higher Learning Commission of the North Central Association.
