= Ridgewater College =

Two-campus community college in Minnesota, US

- Motto: Creating Opportunities. Changing Lives.
- Type: Public community college
- Established: 1996
- Parent institution: Minnesota State Colleges and Universities System
- President: Craig Johnson
- Students: 5,500
- Location: Willmar and Hutchinson, Minnesota, United States; 45.1375°N 95.0722°W
- Colors: Red & gray
- Nickname: Warriors
- Sporting affiliations: NJCAA; MCAC
- Website: www.ridgewater.edu

Ridgewater College is a public community college in Willmar and Hutchinson, Minnesota. It was founded in 1996 as part of the Minnesota State Colleges and Universities System. It was created by the consolidation of Willmar Community College (founded in 1962) and Hutchinson-Willmar Regional Technical College (itself a merger of independent Willmar and Hutchinson technical colleges). Its name refers to the rivers and lakes near the colleges and to the glacial ridge in the region.
