= Central Lakes College =

Community college in Brainerd and Staples, Minnesota, US

- Motto: We Build Futures
- Type: Public community college
- Established: 1938
- Parent institution: Minnesota State Colleges and Universities System
- Academic affiliations: Minnesota College Athletic Conference
- President: Hara Charlier
- Students: 6,000
- Location: Brainerd and Staples, Minnesota, United States; 46.3459127°N 94.2164890°W
- Campus: Small city, 216 acres (87 ha)
- Colors: Navy & red
- Nickname: Raiders
- Sporting affiliations: NJCAA
- Website: www.clcmn.edu

Central Lakes College is a public community college with campuses in Brainerd and Staples, Minnesota. It is part of the Minnesota State Colleges and Universities System. The college was formed from the merger of three different colleges: Brainerd Community College (Brainerd Junior College), Brainerd Technical College (Brainerd Technical Institute), and Staples Technical College (Staples Technical Institute).

== Campuses ==
=== Brainerd Campus ===
Central Lakes College in Brainerd includes courses in the liberal arts and sciences with an Associate in Arts degree and Minnesota Transfer Curriculum for transfers to a four-year college. It also offers Associate in Science degrees, and technical programs that have Associate in Applied Science degrees, diplomas and certificates to get students in the work world in a short amount of time. The college also included many unique degrees such as Underwater Diving along with an assortment of "green" environmental and ecological courses.

=== Staples Campus ===
Staples community college is mostly technical programs with Associate in Applied Science (AAS) degrees, diplomas and certifications including robotics, heavy equipment operation, and diesel technology as well as a smaller liberal arts program Associate in Arts (AA).

== Athletics ==
Central Lakes College is home of the Raiders. There is NJCAA Volleyball, Football, Basketball, Baseball, Softball, and Clay Target. The Raiders compete in the Minnesota College Athletic Conference.

== Academics ==
The college offers the Associate in Arts, Associate in Science, and Associate in Applied Science degrees. It also offers diploma and certificate programs. It is also accredited for its concurrent enrollment programs by the National Alliance of Concurrent Enrollment Partnerships (NACEP).

Central Lakes College in Brainerd collaborated with Southwest Minnesota State University to establish a 2 + 2 articulation agreement in Theatre Arts.
