= Minnesota State Community and Technical College =

Multi-campus public college in Minnesota, US

Coordinates: 46°17′21″N 96°5′50″W

- Type: Public community and technical college
- Established: 1960
- Affiliations: Minnesota College Athletic Conference
- President: Dr. Carrie Brimhall
- Faculty: 270
- Administrative staff: 636
- Students: 6,464
- Location: Moorhead, Fergus Falls, Detroit Lakes, Wadena, Minnesota, United States
- Campus: Suburban, Rural
- Colors: Blue and Green (college) and Blue and Gold (athletics)
- Mascot: Spartan
- Website: www.minnesota.edu

Minnesota State Community and Technical College (M State) is a public community and technical college with multiple campuses in Minnesota. The college is a member of the Minnesota State Colleges and Universities system. It offers more than 70 career and liberal arts programs on its campuses and more than 25 online programs and majors through its eCampus. M State enrolls more than 9,000 campus-based and online students annually.

== History ==
M State was created in 2003 with the merger of Fergus Falls Community College and three campuses of Northwest Technical College. The goal of the merger was to create a comprehensive community college to provide technical education and coursework for students interested in pursuing a bachelor's degree. Each of the campuses has existed as a college for 50 years or more.

The college offers the Associate in Arts university transfer, Associate in Fine Arts, Associate in Science and Associate in Applied Science degrees, certificate programs and diplomas. Its largest programs are liberal arts transfer, nursing, business, radiologic technology and computer-related degree programs. Unique programs include electrical line worker, equine science, power sports technology, American Sign Language, entrepreneurship and medical laboratory technician.

M State is a part of the Metro College Alliance, which began in 2025.

== Athletics ==
The M State-Fergus Falls Spartans have fielded teams since the 1960s and compete in the NJCAA in football, volleyball, men's and women's basketball, baseball, softball and men's and women's golf. The Spartans are members of the Minnesota College Athletic Conference.
