= Minnesota West Community and Technical College =

Public college in Worthington, Minnesota, US

Coordinates: 43.6221862°N 95.6272322°W

- Type: Community college
- Established: 1997
- President: Terry Gaalswyk, Ph.D.
- Location: Canby, Granite Falls, Jackson, Pipestone and Worthington, Minnesota, United States
- Campus: 76 acres (31 ha)
- Mascot: Bluejays
- Website: www.mnwest.edu

Minnesota West Community and Technical College is a public community and technical college in Minnesota with five campuses: Canby, Granite Falls, Jackson, Pipestone, and Worthington. The college also has learning centers in Luverne, Marshall, and Redwood Falls. Students have the opportunity to earn an Associate Degree, Diploma, or Certificate in more than 60 disciplines.

== History ==
The college was established on January 1, 1997, by the merging of Worthington Community College and Southwestern Technical College (itself a merger of four separate local vocational schools).

Minnesota West's individual campuses have a history dating back 75 years. The campuses were originally under the jurisdiction of the local school district and offered programs that served the local and regional economy. On July 1, 1985, the four then area technical institutes at Canby, Granite Falls, Jackson, and Pipestone were officially merged to form Southwestern Technical Institute. The Minnesota State Legislature renamed all technical institutes, technical colleges on July 1, 1989. Southwestern Technical College was a member institution of the former Minnesota Technical College System and on July 1, 1995, became one of 32 member institutions of the Minnesota State Colleges and Universities system.

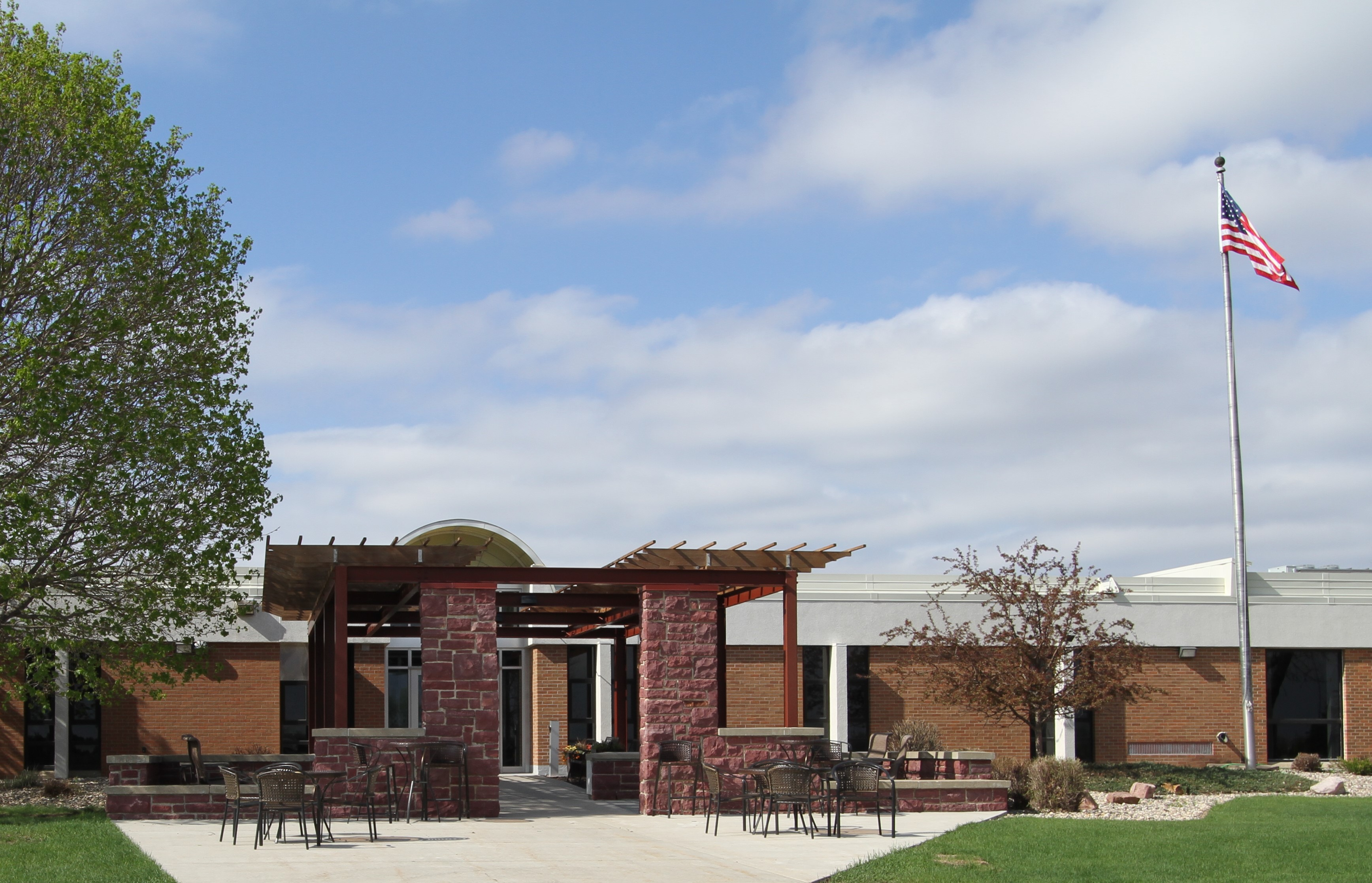
Entrance to the Pipestone campus

The former Worthington Community College was established in 1936 as an institution of higher education by and under the jurisdiction of the local school district to meet the post secondary education needs of the community and surrounding area. The first campus was located in the Worthington High School and in 1966 the college moved to its current, 76-acre (31 ha) campus located to the north of Lake Okabena. In 1964, Worthington Junior College was transferred to the State Junior College Board and was named Worthington State Junior College. In 1973 the name was changed to Worthington Community College and the college was placed under the jurisdiction of the Minnesota Community College System. On July 1, 1995, Worthington Community College became a member institution of the Minnesota State Colleges and Universities system.

== Athletics ==
Minnesota West athletic teams for men and women are called the Bluejays. The college is a member of the National Junior College Athletic Association and the Minnesota College Athletic Conference.
