= 2019 Mississippi Gulf Coast Bulldogs football team =

American college football season

2019 Mississippi Gulf Coast Bulldogs football

NJCAA champion MACJC champion

MACJC championship game, W 22–19 at Northwest Mississippi

NJCAA championship game, W 24–13 vs. Lackawanna
- Conference: Mississippi Association of Community and Junior Colleges
- South Division
- Record: 12–0 (6–0 MACJC)
- Head coach: Jack Wright (2nd season)
- Defensive coordinator: Brett Shufelt (1st season)
- Home stadium: A. L. May Memorial Stadium

2019 Mississippi Association of Community and Junior Colleges football standings
	Conf.			Overall
Team	W		L	W		L
North Division
No. 6 Northwest Mississippi x†y	4	–	2	8	–	3
No. 14 East Mississippi x†	4	–	2	6	–	4
Itawamba x	4	–	2	5	–	4
Holmes x	4	–	2	4	–	5
Mississippi Delta	3	–	3	3	–	6
Northeast Mississippi	2	–	4	3	–	6
Coahoma	0	–	6	1	–	8
South Division
No. 1 Mississippi Gulf Coast x†y$^	6	–	0	12	–	0
No. 10 Jones (MS) †	5	–	1	7	–	3
No. 11 Hinds	4	–	2	7	–	3
Copiah–Lincoln	2	–	3	4	–	5
East Central (MS)	3	–	3	4	–	5
Pearl River	1	–	4	3	–	6
Southwest Mississippi	0	–	6	0	–	9
Championship: Mississippi Gulf Coast 22, Northwest Mississippi 19
$ – Conference champion; x – Division champion/co-champions; † – Conference playoff participant; y – Championship game participant; ^ – NJCAA National Championship participant; Rankings from NJCAA poll

The 2019 Mississippi Gulf Coast Bulldogs football team was an American football team that represented Mississippi Gulf Coast Junior College as a member of the Mississippi Association of Community and Junior Colleges (MACJC) during the 2019 junior college football season. Led by second-year head coach Jack Wright, the Bulldogs compiled a perfect 12–0 record (6–0 in conference games), defeated Lackawanna in the national championship game, and won the NJCAA National Football Championship. It was Mississippi Gulf Coast's fifth national championship, following the 1948, 1971, 1984, and 2007 teams.

== Schedule ==
Date	Opponent	Site	Result	Attendance	Source
August 29	at Mississippi Delta*	Moorhead, MS	W 49-9		
September 5	Coahoma*	Perkinston, MS	W 36–6		
September 12	at Holmes*	Goodman, MS	W 41–7		
September 19	Jones	Perkinston, MS	W 20–14		
September 26	at Copiah–Lincoln	H.L. Stone Stadium; Wesson, MS	W 38–20		
October 5	Southwest Mississippi^{†}	Perkinston, MS	W 55–24		
October 10	at East Central (MS)	Bailey Stadium; Decatur, MS	W 25–5		
October 17	Pearl River	Perkinston, MS	W 25–3		
October 24	at Hinds	Raymond, MS	W 31–21		
November 2	East Mississippi*	Perkinston, MS (MACJC semifinal)	W 31–7		
November 9	at Northwest Mississippi*	Senatobia, MS (MACJC championship game)	W 22–19		
December 5	vs. Lackawanna*	Carnie Smith Stadium; Pittsburg, KS (NJCAA championship game)	W 24–13		
*Non-conference game; ^{†}Homecoming
