= 2018 East Mississippi Lions football team =

American college football season

2018 East Mississippi Lions football

NJCAA champion MACJC champion MACJC North Division champion

MACJC championship game, W 19–14 vs. Jones

NJCAA championship game, W 10–9 vs. Garden City
- Conference: Mississippi Association of Community and Junior Colleges
- North Division
- Record: 12–0 (6–0 MACJC)
- Head coach: Buddy Stephens (11th season)
- Home stadium: Sullivan-Windham Field

2018 Mississippi Association of Community and Junior Colleges football standings
	Conf.			Overall
Team	W		L	W		L
North Division
No. 1 East Mississippi x†y$^	6	–	0	12	–	0
No. 7 Northwest Mississippi †	5	–	1	8	–	2
Holmes	3	–	3	5	–	4
Itawamba	3	–	3	5	–	4
Mississippi Delta	3	–	6	3	–	6
Northeast Mississippi	1	–	5	1	–	8
Coahoma	0	–	6	0	–	9
South Division
No. 5 Jones (MS) x†y	6	–	0	10	–	2
No. 18 Copiah–Lincoln †	5	–	1	6	–	4
No. 12 Mississippi Gulf Coast	4	–	2	7	–	2
East Central (MS)	3	–	3	4	–	5
Hinds	2	–	4	4	–	5
Pearl River	2	–	5	2	–	7
Southwest Mississippi	0	–	6	1	–	8
Championshi[: East Mississippi 19, Jones 14
$ – Conference champion; x – Division champion/co-champions; † – Conference playoff participant; y – Championship game participant; ^ – NJCAA National Championship participant; Rankings from NJCAA poll

The 2018 East Mississippi Lions football team was an American football team that represented East Mississippi Community College as a member of the Mississippi Association of Community and Junior Colleges (MACJC) during the 2018 junior college football season. Led by 11th-year head coach Buddy Stephens, Lions compiled a perfect 12–0 record (6–0 in conference games), defeated Garden City in the national championship game, and won the NJCAA National Football Championship. It was East Mississippi's fifth national championship, following the 2011, 2013, 2014, and 2018 teams.

The team played its home games at Sullivan-Windham Field in Scooba, Mississippi.

== Schedule ==
Date	Opponent	Site	Result	Attendance	Source
August 30	Hinds*	Sullivan-Windham Field; Scooba, MS	W 50–0		
September 6	at Pearl River*	Dobie Holden Stadium; Poplarville, MS	W 59–10		
September 13	at Itawamba	Fulton, MS	W 56–26		
September 20	Mississippi Delta	Sullivan-Windham Field; Scooba, MS	W 54–13		
September 27	at East Central (MS)*	Decatur, MS	W 24–21		
October 4	at Northwest Mississippi	Senatobia, MS	W 34–6		
October 13	Holmes	Sullivan-Windham Field; Scooba, MS	W 56–21		
October 18	Coahoma	Sullivan-Windham Field; Scooba, MS	W 47–0		
October 25	at Northeast Mississippi	Booneville, MS	W 26–7		
November 3	Copiah–Lincoln*	Sullivan-Windham Field; Scooba, MS (MACJC semifinal)	W 31–7		
November 10	Jones*	Sullivan-Windham Field; Scooba, MS (MACJC championship game)	W 19–14		
November 29	vs. Garden City*	Carnie Smith Stadium; Pittsburg, KS (NJCAA championship game)	W 10–9		
*Non-conference game
