= 2019 junior college football season =

American junior college football season

- National Championship: Carnie Smith Stadium, Pittsburg, KS, (NJCAA); Memorial Stadium, Bakersfield, CA, (CCCAA)
- Champion(s): Mississippi Gulf Coast (NJCAA); Riverside City (CCCAA)

The 2019 junior college football season was the season of intercollegiate junior college football running from September to December 2019. The season ended with two national champions: one from the National Junior College Athletic Association and one from the California Community College Athletic Association (CCCAA).

The NJCAA champion was Mississippi Gulf Coast who defeated Lackawanna 24–13 in the NJCAA National Football Championship. The CCCAA champion was Riverside City who defeated San Mateo 31–14 in the CCCAA State Championship.

== Conference standings ==
=== NJCAA ===
2019 Iowa Community College Athletic Conference football standings
	Conf.			Overall
Team	W		L	W		L
No. 18 Iowa Central $	2	–	0	7	–	6
No. 4 Iowa Western	1	–	1	9	–	3
Ellsworth	0	–	2	2	–	9
$ – Conference champion; Rankings from NJCAA poll

2019 Kansas Jayhawk Community College Conference football standings
	Conf.			Overall
Team	W		L	W		L
No. 8 Independence $	6	–	1	8	–	2
No. 3 Hutchinson	5	–	2	10	–	2
No. 5 Butler (KS)	5	–	2	10	–	3
No. 9 Garden City	5	–	2	8	–	3
No. 20 Highland (KS)	4	–	3	6	–	4
Coffeyville	2	–	5	4	–	7
Fort Scott	1	–	6	2	–	8
Dodge City	0	–	7	0	–	10
$ – Conference champion; Rankings from NJCAA poll

2019 Minnesota College Athletic Conference football standings
	Conf.			Overall
Team	W		L	W		L
East Division
Mesabi Range x†	5	–	0	7	–	2
Itasca †y	3	–	2	8	–	4
Rochester C&T †	3	–	2	6	–	3
Central Lakes x†y$	2	–	3	6	–	5
Vermilion	2	–	3	2	–	6
Fond du Lac	0	–	5	0	–	9
West Division
NDSCS x†	4	–	0	8	–	2
Minnesota West C&T †	2	–	2	6	–	4
Northland (MN) †	2	–	2	3	–	6
Dakota College †	1	–	2	3	–	5
Minnesota State C&T	0	–	3	1	–	6
Championship: Central Lakes 47, Itasca 19
$ – Conference champion; † – Conference playoff participant; y – Championship game participant

2019 Mississippi Association of Community and Junior Colleges football standings
	Conf.			Overall
Team	W		L	W		L
North Division
No. 6 Northwest Mississippi x†y	4	–	2	8	–	3
No. 14 East Mississippi x†	4	–	2	6	–	4
Itawamba x	4	–	2	5	–	4
Holmes x	4	–	2	4	–	5
Mississippi Delta	3	–	3	3	–	6
Northeast Mississippi	2	–	4	3	–	6
Coahoma	0	–	6	1	–	8
South Division
No. 1 Mississippi Gulf Coast x†y$^	6	–	0	12	–	0
No. 10 Jones (MS) †	5	–	1	7	–	3
No. 11 Hinds	4	–	2	7	–	3
Copiah–Lincoln	2	–	3	4	–	5
East Central (MS)	3	–	3	4	–	5
Pearl River	1	–	4	3	–	6
Southwest Mississippi	0	–	6	0	–	9
Championship: Mississippi Gulf Coast 22, Northwest Mississippi 19
$ – Conference champion; x – Division champion/co-champions; † – Conference playoff participant; y – Championship game participant; ^ – NJCAA National Championship participant; Rankings from NJCAA poll

2019 Northeast Football Conference standings
	Conf.			Overall
Team	W		L	W		L
No. 2 Lackawanna $^	2	–	0	10	–	1
No. 15 ASA Brooklyn	1	–	1	8	–	2
No. 19 Monroe	0	–	2	8	–	3
$ – Conference champion; ^ – NJCAA National Championship participant; Rankings from NJCAA poll

2019 Southwest Junior College Football Conference standings
	Conf.			Overall
Team	W		L	W		L
No. 7 Kilgore †	6	–	2	8	–	2
No. 16 Trinity Valley †	5	–	3	7	–	4
No. 17 Navarro †y$	4	–	4	6	–	5
New Mexico Military †y	4	–	4	6	–	5
Cisco	3	–	4	5	–	4
Northeastern Oklahoma A&M	3	–	4	4	–	5
Tyler	3	–	4	4	–	5
Blinn	2	–	5	4	–	5
Championship: Navarro 36, New Mexico Military 35
$ – Conference champion; † – Conference playoff participant; y – Championship game participant; Rankings from NJCAA poll

2019 NJCAA independents football records
	Conf.			Overall
Team	W		L	W		L
No. 12 Georgia Military		–		8	–	3
ASA Miami		–		7	–	3
Nassau		–		7	–	4
No. 13 Snow		–		5	–	3
Arkansas Baptist		–		6	–	4
Hudson Valley		–		5	–	4
DuPage		–		4	–	8
Hocking		–		3	–	6
Louisburg		–		2	–	6
Erie		–		2	–	6
Rankings from NJCAA poll

=== CCCAA ===
==== SCFA ====
2019 American Metro League standings
	Conf.					Overall
Team	W		L		T	W		L		T
No. 14 Chaffey $	5	–	0	–	1	10	–	0	–	0
West Los Angeles	4	–	1	–	0	5	–	4	–	0
Santa Ana	4	–	2	–	0	5	–	5	–	0
Los Angeles Valley	2	–	4	–	0	3	–	6	–	0
Glendale (CA)	2	–	4	–	0	2	–	8	–	0
Los Angeles Southwest #	1	–	3	–	2	1	–	7	–	0
Compton	0	–	4	–	1	1	–	7	–	0
$ – Conference champion; # – Los Angeles Southwest's games against Chaffey and Compton were ruled no contests and were recorded as a tie for both teams in conference games only; Rankings from CCCAA poll

2019 National Central League standings
	Conf.			Overall
Team	W		L	W		L
No. 12 Mt. San Antonio $^	4	–	1	7	–	4
No. 13 Cerritos	3	–	2	7	–	4
No. 17 San Diego Mesa	3	–	2	7	–	4
No. T21 Fullerton	3	–	2	5	–	5
No. 15 El Camino	2	–	3	7	–	4
Palomar	0	–	5	3	–	7
$ – Conference champion; ^ – CCCAA playoff participant; Rankings from CCCAA poll

2019 American Mountain League standings
	Conf.			Overall
Team	W		L	W		L
No. 24 San Bernardino Valley $	5	–	0	9	–	2
Antelope Valley	4	–	1	7	–	3
Mt. San Jacinto	3	–	2	8	–	3
Citrus	1	–	4	4	–	6
Victor Valley	1	–	4	4	–	6
Desert	1	–	4	2	–	8
$ – Conference champion; Rankings from CCCAA poll

2019 National Northern League standings
	Conf.			Overall
Team	W		L	W		L
No. 3 College of the Canyons +^	4	–	1	9	–	3
No. 10 Ventura +	4	–	1	8	–	3
No. 8 Long Beach City +	4	–	1	7	–	3
East Los Angeles	2	–	3	4	–	6
Bakersfield	1	–	4	3	–	7
Moorpark	0	–	5	1	–	9
+ – Conference co-champions; ^ – CCCAA playoff participant; Rankings from CCCAA poll

2019 American Pacific League standings
	Conf.			Overall
Team	W		L	W		L
Allan Hancock $	5	–	0	9	–	2
Pasadena City	4	–	1	6	–	4
Los Angeles Harbor	2	–	3	3	–	7
Pierce	2	–	3	3	–	7
Santa Barbara City	2	–	3	3	–	7
Santa Monica	0	–	5	2	–	8
$ – Conference champion

2019 National Southern League standings
	Conf.			Overall
Team	W		L	W		L
No. 1 Riverside City $^	5	–	0	13	–	0
No. 5 Saddleback ^	4	–	1	9	–	2
Golden West	3	–	2	5	–	5
No. T21 Southwestern (CA)	2	–	3	6	–	5
Grossmont	1	–	4	1	–	9
Orange Coast	0	–	5	1	–	9
$ – Conference champion; ^ – CCCAA playoff participant; Rankings from CCCAA poll

==== NCFC ====
2019 American Golden Coast League standings
	Conf.			Overall
Team	W		L	W		L
No. 20 Reedley $	6	–	0	10	–	1
No. T25 Monterey Peninsula	5	–	1	10	–	1
Cabrillo	4	–	2	8	–	3
Hartnell	3	–	3	6	–	4
Merced	2	–	4	4	–	6
Gavilan	1	–	5	2	–	8
San Jose City	0	–	6	0	–	10
$ – Conference champion; Rankings from CCCAA poll

2019 American Pacific 7 League standings
	Conf.			Overall
Team	W		L	W		L
No. 23 Foothill $	5	–	0	10	–	1
De Anza	4	–	1	6	–	4
Los Medanos	3	–	2	4	–	6
Yuba	2	–	3	3	–	7
Contra Costa	1	–	4	2	–	8
College of the Redwoods	0	–	5	2	–	8
$ – Conference champion; Rankings from CCCAA poll

2019 National Bay 6 League standings
	Conf.			Overall
Team	W		L	W		L
No. 2 San Mateo $^	5	–	0	12	–	1
No. 19 Laney	4	–	1	6	–	5
No. 11 CC of San Francisco	3	–	2	8	–	3
Chabot	1	–	3	4	–	5
Santa Rosa	1	–	3	2	–	7
Diablo Valley	0	–	5	3	–	7
$ – Conference champion; ^ – CCCAA playoff participant; Rankings from CCCAA poll

2019 National Norcal League standings
	Conf.			Overall
Team	W		L	W		L
No. 6 American River $^	5	–	0	8	–	3
No. 9 Butte	4	–	1	8	–	3
No. 16 Sierra	3	–	2	7	–	4
No. 18 Shasta	2	–	3	7	–	4
Feather River	1	–	4	1	–	9
College of the Siskiyous	0	–	5	0	–	10
$ – Conference champion; ^ – CCCAA playoff participant; Rankings from CCCAA poll

2019 National Valley League standings
	Conf.			Overall
Team	W		L	W		L
No. 7 Fresno City $^	5	–	0	8	–	3
No. 4 Modesto ^	4	–	1	9	–	3
No. T25 College of the Sequoias	3	–	2	6	–	5
San Joaquin Delta	2	–	3	4	–	6
Sacramento City	1	–	4	2	–	8
West Hills Coalinga	0	–	5	0	–	10
$ – Conference champion; ^ – CCCAA playoff participant; Rankings from CCCAA poll

== Postseason ==
=== Playoffs ===
==== NJCAA ====
Championship game December 5 Carnie Smith Stadium—Pittsburg, KS
1	Mississippi Gulf Coast	24
2	Lackawanna	13

==== CCCAA ====
===== SCFA playoffs =====
Semifinals; November 23; Campus sites
1	Riverside City	48
3/4	Mt. San Antonio	0
2	Saddleback	53
4/3	College of the Canyons	58

Regional finals November 30; Campus sites
1	Riverside City	68
4/3	Golden West	21

===== NCFC playoffs =====
Semifinals; November 23; Campus sites
1	San Mateo	21
4	Fresno City	0
2	Modesto	35
3	American River	28

Regional finals November 30; Campus sites
1	San Mateo	41
2	Modesto	0

===== State championship =====
Championship game December 14; Memorial Stadium—Bakersfield, CA
1	Riverside City	31
1	San Mateo	22

== Awards and honors ==
=== All-Americans ===
2019 All-California Community College Team

Offense

Position	Name	Height	Weight (lbs.)	Class	Hometown	Team
QB	Chance Nolan	6'2"	200	Fr.	Menifee, California	Saddleback
RB	Rachaad White	6'1"	190	So.	Kansas City, Missouri	Mt. San Antonio
RB	Dwan James	5'9"	210	So.	Mobile, Alabama	West Hills Coalinga
WR	Terrell Vaughn	5'9"	190	Fr.	Oxnard, California	Ventura
WR	Bryson Allen	6'2"	185	Fr.	Tulare, California	College of the Sequoias
WR	Alonzell Henderson	5'10"	175	So.	Los Angeles, California	College of the Canyons
WR	Kameron Pleasant	6'1"	200	So.	Detroit, Michigan	Cabrillo
OL	T. J. Bass	6'5"	315	So.	Deming, Washington	Butte
OL	Jordan Palmer	6'2"	310	So.	Northridge, California	College of the Canyons
OL	Sam Langi	6'5"	310	So.	San Francisco, California	San Mateo
OL	Donny Long	6'4"	295	So.	Norco, California	Riverside City
OL	Paul Sogialofa	6'4"	340	So.	Pago Pago, American Samoa	Modesto
All-Purpose	Robert Ferrel	5'9"	155	So.	Sparks, Nevada	El Camino
Utility	Terrell Carter	6'2"	195	So.	San Diego, California	San Mateo
PK	Alberto Arroyo	5'11"	180	Fr.	Carpinteria, California	Ventura

Defense

Position	Name	Height	Weight (lbs.)	Class	Hometown	Team
LB	D'Anthony Jones	6'2"	250	So.	Lawndale, California	Long Beach City
LB	Eteva Mauga-Clements	6'2"	218	So.	American Samoa	Diablo Valley
LB	Kobey Fitzgerald	5'11"	220	So.	Anaheim, California	Riverside City
LB	George Spithorst	6'2"	235	So.	Elk Grove, California	American River
DL	Noah Wright	6'5"	320	So.	Lemoore, California	College of the Sequoias
DL	Joshua Tarango	6'3"	290	Fr.	Anaheim Hills, California	Fullerton
DL	Longahulu Ahoia	6'1"	265	So.		San Mateo
DL	Shane Irwin	6'4"	245	So.	Palos Verdes Estates, California	Long Beach City
DL	Cole Parker	6'2"	250	So.	Corning, California	Shasta
DB	Bennett Williams	6'1"	195	So.	Campbell, California	San Mateo
DB	Justin Harrington	6'4"	218	So.	Raleigh, North Carolina	Bakersfield
DB	Ronald Hardge III	6'2"	190	So.	Hollywood, Florida	CC of San Francisco
DB	Shawn Dourseau	5'11"	190	Fr.	Perris, California	Riverside City
KR	Kashan Griffin	6'1"	170	Fr.	Apple Valley, California	Fullerton
PR	Eric Davis Jr.	5'9"	175	So.	Folsom, California	American River
P	Eli Riofrio	6'2"	190	So.	Fresno, California	Fresno City

== See also ==
- 2019 NCAA Division I FBS football season
- 2019 NCAA Division I FCS football season
- 2019 NCAA Division II football season
- 2019 NCAA Division III football season
- 2019 NAIA football season
- 2019 U Sports football season
