= Jack Wright (junior college football) =

American football coach (born c. 1979)

Current position
- Title: Head coach
- Team: Mississippi Gulf Coast
- Conference: MACCC
- Record: 62–15

Biographical details
- Born: c. 1979 (age 46–47); Batesville, Mississippi, U.S.
- Education: Arkansas State University (1999, 2001)

Playing career
- 1997–2000: Arkansas State
- Positions: Center, long snapper

Coaching career (HC unless noted)
- 2001: North Delta Academy (MS) (OL)
- 2002–2004: Meridian HS (MS) (OL)
- 2005–2007: Millsaps (OL/S&C)
- 2008–2012: Northwest Mississippi (OC/QB)
- 2013: Holmes (OL)
- 2014–2015: Northwest Mississippi
- 2016: Southern Miss (OL)
- 2017: Grenada HS (MS) (OC)
- 2018–present: Mississippi Gulf Coast

Head coaching record
- Overall: 77–22
- Tournaments: 2–0 (NJCAA playoffs); 5–5 (MACJC / MACCC playoffs)

Accomplishments and honors

Championships
- 2 NJCAA (2015, 2019); 2 MACJC (2015, 2019); 7 MACJC / MACCC Southern Division (2019–2025)

Jack Wright (born c. 1979) is an American junior college football coach. He is the head football coach for Mississippi Gulf Coast Community College, a position he has held since 2018. He was the head football coach for Northwest Mississippi Community College from 2014 to 2015. He also coached for North Delta Academy, Meridian High School, Millsaps, Holmes, Southern Miss, and Grenada High School. He played college football for Arkansas State as a center and long snapper.

== Head coaching record ==
Year	Team	Overall	Conference	Standing	Bowl/playoffs	NJCAA/DI^{#}
Northwest Mississippi Rangers (Mississippi Association of Community and Junior Colleges) (2014–2015)
2014	Northwest Mississippi	4–6	4–2	4th (North)	L MACJC semifinal	
2015	Northwest Mississippi	11–1	5–1	2nd (North)	W MACJC championship, W Mississippi Bowl	1
Northwest Mississippi:		15–7	9–3			
Mississippi Gulf Coast Bulldogs (Mississippi Association of Community and Junior Colleges / Mississippi Association of Community Colleges Conference) (2018–present)
2018	Mississippi Gulf Coast	7–2	4–2	3rd (South)		12
2019	Mississippi Gulf Coast	12–0	6–0	1st (South)	W MACJC championship, W NJCAA National Championship	1
2020–21	Mississippi Gulf Coast	5–1	5–1	1st (South)	L MACJC championship	
2021	Mississippi Gulf Coast	7–2	5–1	T–1st (South)		14
2022	Mississippi Gulf Coast	6–4	5–1	T–1st (South)	L MACJC semifinal	
2023	Mississippi Gulf Coast	8–2	5–1	T–1st (South)	L MACCC semifinal	8
2024	Mississippi Gulf Coast	8–2	5–1	T–1st (South)	L MACCC semifinal	9
2025	Mississippi Gulf Coast	9–2	5–1	T–1st (South)	L MACCC championship	6
Mississippi Gulf Coast:		62–15	40–8			
Total:		77–22				
National championship Conference title Conference division title or championship game berth
