= Mark Duda =

American football player and coach (born 1961)

Profile
- Position: Head coach

Personal information
- Born: February 4, 1961 (age 65); Plymouth, Pennsylvania, U.S.
- Listed height: 6 ft 3 in (1.91 m)
- Listed weight: 273 lb (124 kg)

Career information
- High school: Wyoming Valley West (Plymouth)
- College: Maryland
- NFL draft: 1983: 4th round, 96th overall pick

Career history

Playing
- St. Louis Cardinals (1983–1987)

Coaching
- Wyoming Valley West HS (PA) (1988) Assistant coach; East Stroudsburg (1989) Assistant coach; Meyers HS (PA) (1990–1992) Defensive coordinator; Lackawanna (1993) Defensive coordinator & linebackers coach; Lackawanna (1994–2025) Head coach

Awards and highlights
- First-team All-ACC (1982)

Career NFL statistics
- Sacks: 9.5
- Fumble recoveries: 4
- Stats at Pro Football Reference

Mark D. Duda (born February 4, 1961) is an American former professional football player who was a defensive tackle in the National Football League (NFL). He played his entire NFL career with the St. Louis Cardinals from 1983 until 1987. He served as the head football coach at Lackawanna College in Scranton, Pennsylvania from 1994 to 2025.

From 1979 to 1982, Duda played college football for the Maryland Terrapins, where he recorded 19 sacks (13 of them in his last season). He played in 55 NFL games for the Cardinals between 1983 and 1987.

Duda became the defensive coordinator at Lackawanna in 1993, when the school started its football program. He was promoted to head coach the next season. In 2019, Lackawanna went to its first NJCAA National Football Championship.

== Head coaching record ==
Year	Team	Overall	Conference	Standing	Bowl/playoffs	NJCAA^{#}
Lackawanna Falcons (Seaboard Conference) (1994)
1994	Lackawanna	9–2	4–0	1st	L McKinnon Midwest Bowl	
Lackawanna Falcons (Independent) (1995–1996)
1995	Lackawanna	8–3			L Golden Isles Bowl	
1996	Lackawanna	4–6				
Lackawanna Falcons (Northeast Football Conference) (1997–2001)
1997	Lackawanna	9–2	5–0	1st	L Dixie Rotary Bowl	
1998	Lackawanna	8–2	6–0	1st		
1999	Lackawanna	6–5	3–3	T–4th		
2000	Lackawanna	10–1	5–0	1st	L Golden Isles Bowl	
2001	Lackawanna	10–1	5–0	1st	L Real Dairy Bowl	
Lackawanna Falcons (Independent) (2002)
2002	Lackawanna	6–4				
Lackawanna Falcons (Northeast Football Conference) (2003–2025)
2003	Lackawanna	8–3	3–1	3rd		
2004	Lackawanna	4–7	1–2	5th		
2005	Lackawanna	5–3	1–2	6th		
2006	Lackawanna	1–9 (Note: Lackawanna finished the 2006 season 9–1 but had to forfeit eight wins, including their Valley of the Sun win, due to an ineligible player.)	0–5	N/A	V Valley of the Sun Bowl	
2007	Lackawanna	7–3	3–2	T–2nd		
2008	Lackawanna	7–4	3–2	3rd	L North Star Bowl	
2009	Lackawanna	5–4	3–2	T–2nd		
2010	Lackawanna	9–2	4–2		W Graphic Egde Bowl	
2011	Lackawanna	7–4	3–3	T–3rd	L Salt City Bowl	
2012	Lackawanna	5–5	2–4	5th		
2013	Lackawanna	4–6	1–4	T–5th		
2014	Lackawanna	5–5	2–3	T–3rd		
2015	Lackawanna	8–2	4–0	1st		12
2016	Lackawanna	10–1	2–0	1st	W Valley of the Sun Bowl	8
2017	Lackawanna	7–2	1–1	2nd		19
2018	Lackawanna	11–0	2–0	1st	W El Toro Bowl	6
2019	Lackawanna	10–1	2–0	1st	L NJCAA National Championship	2
2020–21	Lackawanna	1–1	0–0	N/A		
2021	Lackawanna	7–3	0–1	2nd		
2022	Lackawanna	7–3	2–0	1st	L HF Sinclair Wool Bowl	13
2023	Lackawanna	7–3	2–0	1st		14
2024	Lackawanna	7–3	2–0	1st		11
2025	Lackawanna	4–6	1–1	T–1st		
Lackawanna:		216–106	70–41			
Total:		216–106				
National championship Conference title Conference division title or championship game berth
