= Buddy Stephens =

American football player and coach (born 1966)

Biographical details
- Born: September 6, 1966 (age 60); Huntsville, Alabama, U.S.

Playing career
- 1986–1987: Pearl River
- 1988–1989: Delta State
- Position: Center

Coaching career (HC unless noted)
- 2001–2007: Pearl River (assistant)
- 2008–2025: East Mississippi

Head coaching record
- Overall: 155–31
- Bowls: 7–0
- Tournaments: 1–1 (NJCAA Division I playoffs)

Accomplishments and honors

Championships
- 5 NJCAA National (2011, 2013–2014, 2017–2018); 9 MACJC/MACCC (2009, 2011, 2013–2014, 2016–2018, 2022–2023); 14 MACJC/MACCC North Division (2008–2009, 2011–2019, 2021, 2023, 2025)

Wofford Oran "Buddy" Stephens Jr. is an American junior college football coach. He is the former head football coach at East Mississippi Community College, where he has won five NJCAA National Football Championships and coached future National Football League (NFL) players such as Chad Kelly, Jarran Reed and Dakota Allen.

Stephens is known as the head coach from the first two seasons of the Netflix series Last Chance U. He has won more games at EMCC than any other coach in history. He is also well known for the implementing of the informal "Buddy Stephens rule", the running clock rule of the Mississippi Association of Community College Conference where the clock will run continuously in the second half if a team is leading by 38 or more points.

Stephens played college football for Pearl River and Delta State, both as a center and guard. After serving as an assistant football and girls' soccer coach at Central High School in Tuscaloosa, Alabama, he was hired at Pearl River in 2001.

== Head coaching record ==
Year	Team	Overall	Conference	Standing	Bowl/playoffs	NJCAA^{#}
East Mississippi Lions (Mississippi Association of Community & Junior Colleges / Community Colleges Conference) (2008–2025)
2008	East Mississippi	8–2	6–0	1st (North)		
2009	East Mississippi	11–1	6–0	1st (North)	W Mississippi Bowl	4
2010	East Mississippi	5–5	4–2	2nd (North)		
2011	East Mississippi	12–0	6–0	1st (North)	W El Toro Bowl	1
2012	East Mississippi	8–2	5–1	1st (North)		15
2013	East Mississippi	12–0	6–0	1st (North)	W Mississippi Bowl	1
2014	East Mississippi	12–0	6–0	1st (North)	W Mississippi Bowl	1
2015	East Mississippi	8–1	6–0	1st (North)		7
2016	East Mississippi	11–1	6–0	1st (North)	W Mississippi Bowl	2
2017	East Mississippi	11–1	8–1	1st (North)	W Mississippi Bowl	1
2018	East Mississippi	12–0	6–0	1st (North)	W NJCAA Championship Game	1
2019	East Mississippi	6–4	4–2	T–1st (North)		14
2020–21	No team—COVID-19					
2021	East Mississippi	9–1	6–0	1st (North)		6
2022	East Mississippi	8–3	4–2	2nd (North)		6
2023	East Mississippi	10–3	6–0	1st (North)	L NJCAA Division I Championship Game	2
2024	East Mississippi	5–4	4–2	T–2nd (North)		14
2025	East Mississippi	7–3	5–1	T–1st (North)		12
East Mississippi:		155–31	94–11			
Total:		155–31				
National championship Conference title Conference division title or championship game berth
^{#}Rankings from NJCAA poll.
