= 2014 East Mississippi Lions football team =

American college football season

2014 East Mississippi Lions football

NJCAA championship MACJC champion

MACJC championship game, W 19–14 at Copiah–Lincoln

NJCAA championship game, W 54-15 vs. Iowa Western
- Conference: Mississippi Association of Community and Junior Colleges
- North Division
- Record: 12–0 (6–0 MACJC)
- Head coach: Buddy Stephens (7th season)
- Home stadium: Sullivan/Windham Field

The 2014 East Mississippi Lions football team was an American football team that represented East Mississippi Community College as a member of the Mississippi Association of Community and Junior Colleges (MACJC) during the 2014 junior college football season. Led by seventh-year head coach Buddy Stephens, the Lions compiled a perfect 12–0 record (6–0 in conference games), shut out five consecutive opponents, defeated Iowa Western in the national championship game, and won the NJCAA National Football Championship. It was one of five national championships for East Mississippi, along with the 2011, 2013, 2018, and 2021 teams.

The team played its home games at Sullivan/Windham Field in Scooba, Mississippi.

== Schedule ==
Date	Opponent	Site	Result	Attendance	Source
August 28	at Southwest Mississippi*	Summit, MS	W 52–14		
September 4	Copiah–Lincoln*	Sullivan/Windham Field; Scooba, MS	W 46–10		
September 11	at Coahoma	Clarksdale, MS	W 83–7		
September 18	Northeast Mississippi	Sullivan/Windham Field; Scooba, MS	W 65–7		
September 25	at Itawamba	Fulton, MS	W 51–0		
October 4	Jones County*	Sullivan/Windham Field; Scooba, MS	W 55–0		
October 9	Holmes	Sullivan/Windham Field; Scooba, MS	W 49–0		
October 16	at Northwest Mississippi		W 49–0		
October 23	Mississippi Delta	Sullivan/Windham Field; Scooba, MS	W 65–0		
November 1	Mississippi Gulf Coast*	Sullivan/Windham Field; Scooba, MS (MACJC semifinal)	W 42–21		
November 8	at Copiah–Lincoln*	Wesson, MS (MACJC championship game)	W 54–15		
December 7	vs. Iowa Western*	Biloxi Indian Stadium; Biloxi, MS (NJCAA championship game)	W 34–17		
*Non-conference game
