= 2018 junior college football season =

American junior college football season

- National Championship: Carnie Smith Stadium, Pittsburg, KS, (NJCAA); Charles C. Hughes Stadium, Sacramento, CA, (CCCAA)
- Champion(s): East Mississippi (NJCAA); Laney (CCCAA)

The 2018 junior college football season was the season of intercollegiate junior college football running from September to December 2018. The season ended with two national champions: one from the National Junior College Athletic Association and one from the California Community College Athletic Association (CCCAA).

The NJCAA champion was East Mississippi who defeated Garden City 10–9 in the NJCAA National Football Championship. The CCCAA champion was Laney who defeated Ventura 40–35 in the CCCAA State Championship.

== Conference standings ==
=== NJCAA ===
2018 Iowa Community College Athletic Conference football standings
	Conf.			Overall
Team	W		L	W		L
No. 3 Iowa Western $	2	–	0	10	–	1
No. 13 Iowa Central	1	–	1	8	–	4
Ellsworth	0	–	2	2	–	9
$ – Conference champion; Rankings from NJCAA poll

2018 Kansas Jayhawk Community College Conference football standings
	Conf.			Overall
Team	W		L	W		L
No. 2 Garden City $^	7	–	0	10	–	1
No. 8 Hutchinson	6	–	1	9	–	3
No. 11 Butler (KS)	5	–	2	8	–	4
No. 17 Highland (KS)	4	–	3	6	–	4
Coffeyville	3	–	4	6	–	5
Fort Scott	1	–	6	2	–	8
Independence	1	–	6	2	–	8
Dodge City	1	–	6	2	–	9
$ – Conference champion; ^ – NJCAA National Championship participant; Rankings from NJCAA poll

2018 Minnesota College Athletic Conference football standings
	Conf.			Overall
Team	W		L	W		L
Eastern Division
Central Lakes x†	6	–	0	7	–	3
Mesabi Range †	4	–	1	7	–	3
Itasca †	3	–	2	6	–	3
Rochester C&T	1	–	4	1	–	6
Vermilion	1	–	4	1	–	7
Fond du Lac †	1	–	5	3	–	6
Western Division
Northland (MN) x†y$	5	–	0	8	–	3
NDSCS †y	4	–	1	9	–	2
Dakota College †	3	–	2	5	–	4
Minnesota West C&T †	1	–	4	3	–	5
Minnesota State C&T	0	–	4	1	–	6
Ridgewater	0	–	2	0	–	4
Championship: Northland 34, NDSCS 10
$ – Conference champion; † – Conference playoff participant; y – Championship game participant; Ridgewater canceled their season with three games remaining, including two conference games

2018 Mississippi Association of Community and Junior Colleges football standings
	Conf.			Overall
Team	W		L	W		L
North Division
No. 1 East Mississippi x†y$^	6	–	0	12	–	0
No. 7 Northwest Mississippi †	5	–	1	8	–	2
Holmes	3	–	3	5	–	4
Itawamba	3	–	3	5	–	4
Mississippi Delta	3	–	6	3	–	6
Northeast Mississippi	1	–	5	1	–	8
Coahoma	0	–	6	0	–	9
South Division
No. 5 Jones (MS) x†y	6	–	0	10	–	2
No. 18 Copiah–Lincoln †	5	–	1	6	–	4
No. 12 Mississippi Gulf Coast	4	–	2	7	–	2
East Central (MS)	3	–	3	4	–	5
Hinds	2	–	4	4	–	5
Pearl River	2	–	5	2	–	7
Southwest Mississippi	0	–	6	1	–	8
Championshi[: East Mississippi 19, Jones 14
$ – Conference champion; x – Division champion/co-champions; † – Conference playoff participant; y – Championship game participant; ^ – NJCAA National Championship participant; Rankings from NJCAA poll

2018 Northeast Football Conference standings
	Conf.			Overall
Team	W		L	W		L
No. 6 Lackawanna $	2	–	0	11	–	0
No. 16 Monroe	1	–	1	7	–	2
ASA Brooklyn	0	–	2	6	–	3
$ – Conference champion; Rankings from NJCAA poll

2018 Southwest Junior College Football Conference standings
	Conf.			Overall
Team	W		L	W		L
No. 4 Kilgore †y$	5	–	2	10	–	2
No. 14 NE Oklahoma A&M †y	5	–	2	8	–	4
No. 15 Blinn †	4	–	3	7	–	4
Navarro †	4	–	3	6	–	5
Cisco	3	–	4	5	–	4
Trinity Valley	3	–	4	4	–	5
Tyler	3	–	4	4	–	5
New Mexico Military	1	–	6	3	–	6
Championship: Kilgore 62, Northeastern Oklahoma A&M 19
$ – Conference champion; † – Conference playoff participant; y – Championship game participant; Rankings from NJCAA poll

2018 Western States Football League standings
	Conf.			Overall
Team	W		L	W		L
No. 10 Eastern Arizona $	6	–	1	9	–	3
No. 9 Snow	5	–	2	8	–	3
Pima	4	–	2	6	–	4
No. 19 Scottsdale	4	–	3	7	–	4
Arizona Western	4	–	3	6	–	5
Mesa (AZ)	2	–	4	4	–	5
Glendale (AZ)	2	–	5	3	–	8
Phoenix	0	–	7	1	–	10
$ – Conference champion; Rankings from NJCAA poll

2018 NJCAA independents football records
	Conf.			Overall
Team	W		L	W		L
No. 20 Nassau		–		8	–	3
Arkansas Baptist		–		5	–	2
Louisburg		–		6	–	3
Erie		–		6	–	4
ASA Miami		–		5	–	5
Georgia Military		–		5	–	5
DuPage		–		4	–	6
Hudson Valley		–		2	–	8
Hocking		–		1	–	9
Rankings from NJCAA poll

=== CCCAA ===
==== SCFA ====
2018 American Metro League standings
	Conf.			Overall
Team	W		L	W		L
Chaffey $	6	–	0	10	–	1
Los Angeles Valley	5	–	1	7	–	3
Glendale (CA)	3	–	3	3	–	7
West Los Angeles	3	–	3	3	–	7
Santa Ana	2	–	4	3	–	7
Los Angeles Southwest	1	–	4	2	–	8
Compton	0	–	5	0	–	10
$ – Conference champion

2018 National Central League standings
	Conf.			Overall
Team	W		L	W		L
El Camino $^	5	–	0	8	–	3
Fullerton	4	–	1	9	–	1
Cerritos	2	–	3	6	–	5
Palomar	2	–	3	5	–	6
Mt. San Antonio	1	–	4	5	–	5
San Diego Mesa	1	–	4	4	–	6
$ – Conference champion; ^ – CCCAA playoff participant

2018 American Mountain League standings
	Conf.			Overall
Team	W		L	W		L
San Bernardino Valley $	5	–	0	9	–	2
Citrus	4	–	1	7	–	4
Mt. San Jacinto	2	–	3	7	–	3
Desert	2	–	3	4	–	6
Antelope Valley	1	–	4	3	–	7
Victor Valley	1	–	4	3	–	7
$ – Conference champion

2018 National Northern League standings
	Conf.			Overall
Team	W		L	W		L
College of the Canyons $^	5	–	0	10	–	1
Ventura ^	4	–	1	10	–	3
Bakersfield	3	–	2	6	–	5
East Los Angeles	2	–	3	4	–	6
Long Beach City	1	–	4	4	–	6
Moorpark	0	–	5	1	–	9
+ – Conference co-champions; ^ – CCCAA playoff participant

2018 American Pacific League standings
	Conf.			Overall
Team	W		L	W		L
Allan Hancock $	5	–	0	10	–	1
Pierce	4	–	1	6	–	4
Pasadena City	2	–	3	4	–	6
Santa Monica	2	–	3	4	–	6
Los Angeles Harbor	1	–	4	3	–	7
Santa Barbara City	1	–	4	2	–	8
$ – Conference champion

2018 National Southern League standings
	Conf.			Overall
Team	W		L	W		L
Riverside City $^	5	–	0	10	–	2
Saddleback	4	–	1	7	–	4
Golden West	3	–	2	5	–	6
Southwestern (CA)	2	–	3	7	–	4
Grossmont	1	–	4	1	–	9
Orange Coast	0	–	5	1	–	9
$ – Conference champion; ^ – CCCAA playoff participant

==== NCFC ====
2018 American Golden Coast League standings
	Conf.			Overall
Team	W		L	W		L
Reedley $	6	–	0	10	–	1
Hartnell	4	–	2	8	–	3
Cabrillo	4	–	2	7	–	3
Monterey Peninsula	3	–	3	5	–	5
Merced	3	–	3	4	–	6
San Jose City	1	–	5	2	–	8
Gavilan	0	–	6	0	–	10
$ – Conference champion

2018 American Pacific 7 League standings
	Conf.			Overall
Team	W		L	W		L
De Anza $	5	–	0	10	–	1
Yuba	4	–	1	8	–	3
Foothill	2	–	2	5	–	4
Los Medanos	1	–	3	3	–	6
College of the Redwoods	1	–	4	3	–	7
Contra Costa	1	–	4	1	–	9
$ – Conference champion

2018 National Bay 6 League standings
	Conf.			Overall
Team	W		L	W		L
San Mateo $^	5	–	0	8	–	3
Laney ^	4	–	1	11	–	2
CC of San Francisco	3	–	2	7	–	4
Santa Rosa	1	–	3	5	–	5
Chabot	1	–	4	5	–	5
Diablo Valley	0	–	4	2	–	7
$ – Conference champion; ^ – CCCAA playoff participant

2018 National Norcal League standings
	Conf.			Overall
Team	W		L	W		L
Butte $^	5	–	0	9	–	2
American River	4	–	1	7	–	4
Sierra	3	–	2	7	–	4
College of the Siskiyous	2	–	3	3	–	7
Shasta	1	–	4	2	–	8
Feather River	0	–	5	2	–	8
$ – Conference champion; ^ – CCCAA playoff participant

2018 National Valley League standings
	Conf.			Overall
Team	W		L	W		L
Fresno City $^	5	–	0	9	–	3
Modesto	4	–	1	8	–	3
Sacramento City	3	–	2	5	–	6
West Hills Coalinga	2	–	3	4	–	6
College of the Sequoias	1	–	4	2	–	8
San Joaquin Delta	0	–	5	0	–	10
$ – Conference champion; ^ – CCCAA playoff participant

== Postseason ==
=== Playoffs ===
==== NJCAA ====
Championship game December 5 Carnie Smith Stadium—Pittsburg, KS
1	East Mississippi	10
2	Garden City	9

==== CCCAA ====
===== SCFA playoffs =====
Semifinals; November 17; Campus sites
1	College of the Canyons	13
4	Ventura	21
2	Riverside City	63
3	El Camino	24

Regional finals November 24; Campus sites
2	Riverside City	21
4	Ventura	31

===== NCFC playoffs =====
Semifinals; November 17; Campus sites
1	Butte	26
4	Fresno City	28
2	Laney	14
3	San Mateo	0

Regional finals November 24; Campus sites
2	Laney	30
4	Fresno City	7

===== State championship =====
Championship game December 8 Charles C. Hughes Stadium—Sacramento, CA
2	Laney	40
4	Ventura	35

== See also ==
- 2018 NCAA Division I FBS football season
- 2018 NCAA Division I FCS football season
- 2018 NCAA Division II football season
- 2018 NCAA Division III football season
- 2018 NAIA football season
- 2018 U Sports football season
