= Northeast Football Conference =

Northeastern Football Conference
- Association: NJCAA
- Region: Northeast

The Northeast Football Conference (NFC) is a football conference for National Junior College Athletic Association (NJCAA) teams located in the northeastern United States.

== History ==
The Northeast Football Conference (NFC) was formed prior to the 1997 season. The inaugural season consisted of Alfred State College, State University of New York at Canton (Canton), State University of New York College of Agriculture and Technology at Morrisville—now known as State University of New York at Morrisville (Morrisville), Hudson Valley Community College, Lackawanna Junior College—now known as Lackawanna College, and Cayuga Community College.

== Member schools ==
=== Current members ===
The NFC consists of two member institutions located in the U.S. states of New York and Pennsylvania.

Institution	Location	Founded	Joined	Enrollment (fall 2022)	Endowment (millions)	Nickname	Colors
Lackawanna College	Scranton, Pennsylvania	1894	1997 (Note: Briefly left the conference in 2002 before rejoining in 2003.)	2,043	$10	Falcons	
Monroe University	New York City	1933	2012	7,924	—	Mustangs	

=== Membership map ===
Northeast Football Conference Members

=== Former members ===
Institution	Location	Establishment	Joined NFC	Left NFC	Nickname	Colors	Current football conference
Cayuga Community College	Auburn, New York	1953	1997	1999	Spartans		Disbanded
State University of New York at Canton	Canton, New York	1906	1997	2003	Roos		Disbanded
Alfred State College	Alfred, New York	1908	1997	2010	Pioneers		Empire 8 (D3) (Note: NCAA Division III conference)
State University of New York at Morrisville	Morrisville, New York	1908	1997	2005	Mustangs		Empire 8 (D3)
Hudson Valley Community College	Troy, New York	1953	1997	2012	Vikings		Independent
Dean College	Franklin, Massachusetts	1865	1998	2015	Bulldogs		MASCAC (D3) (Note: NCAA Division III conference)
SUNY Erie	Williamsville, New York	1946	2001	2012	Kats		Independent
Nassau Community College	Uniondale, New York	1959	2004	2015	Lions		Independent
ASA College	New York City, New York	1985	2010	2019	Avengers		Disbanded
Louisburg College	Louisburg, North Carolina	1814	2011	2014	Hurricanes		Independent

== Champions ==
		Record			
Year	Champion(s)	Conference	Overall	Bowl result	Head coach
1997	Lackawanna	5–0	9–2	L Dixie Rotary Bowl	Mark Duda
1998	Lackawanna	6–0	8–2	N/A	Mark Duda
1999	Dean	4–2	7–2	N/A	Jack Charney
1999	Canton	4–2	5–3	N/A	Lou Saban
1999	Morrisville	4–2	6–4	N/A	Terry Dow
2000	Lackawanna	5–0	10–1	L Golden Isles Bowl	Mark Duda
2001	Lackawanna	5–0	10–1	L Real Dairy Bowl	Mark Duda
2002	Morrisville	5–1	9–2	N/A	Terry Dow
2003	Hudson Valley	6–0	8–1	N/A	Bob Jojo
2004	Hudson Valley	6–2	8–3	N/A	Bob Jojo
2005	Nassau	8–0	9–2	N/A	
2006	Lackawanna	5–0	9–1	W Valley of the Sun Bowl (Note: Lackawanna forfeited eight wins, including their Valley of the Sun Bowl win, due to an ineligible player.)	Mark Duda
2007	Dean	4–1	9–1	N/A	Todd Vasey
2008	Dean	5–0	10–1	N/A	Todd Vasey
2009	Dean	4–1	9–2	N/A	Todd Vasey
2010	Nassau			N/A	Mark Campbell
2011	Dean	6–0	8–1	N/A	Todd Vasey
2012	ASA Brooklyn	5–0	9–1	N/A	Dennis Orlando
2013	ASA Brooklyn	5–0	9–1	N/A	Dennis Orlando
2014	Nassau	5–0	10–1	N/A	Joe Osovet
2015	Lackawanna	4–0	8–2	N/A	Mark Duda
2016	Lackawanna	2–0	10–1	W Valley of the Sun Bowl	Mark Duda
2017	ASA Brooklyn	2–0	9–1	N/A	Joe Osovet
2018	Lackawanna	2–0	11–0	W El Toro Bowl	Mark Duda
2019	Lackawanna	2–0	10–1	L NJCAA National Championship	Mark Duda
2020–21	N/A, Monroe did not participate in the fall season due to COVID-19.				
2021	Monroe	1–0	10–1	L Graphic Edge Bowl	Terry Karg
2022	Lackawanna	2–0	7–3	L HF Sinclair Wool Bowl	Mark Duda
2023	Lackawanna	2–0	7–3	N/A	Mark Duda
2024	Lackawanna	2–0	7–3	N/A	Mark Duda

== Yearly standings ==
1997 Northeast Football Conference standings
	Conf.			Overall
Team	W		L	W		L
Lackawanna $	5	–	0	9	–	2
Hudson Valley	3	–	2	6	–	2
Canton	3	–	2	6	–	3
Alfred State	2	–	3	6	–	3
Morrisville	1	–	4	4	–	5
Cayuga*	0	–	5	4	–	6
$ – Conference champion; * Cayuga forfeited five victories including wins over Morrisville, Alfred State, and Lackawanna

1998 Northeast Football Conference standings
	Conf.			Overall
Team	W		L	W		L
Lackawanna $	6	–	0	8	–	2
Cayuga	5	–	1	9	–	2
Canton	3	–	3	5	–	3
Hudson Valley	3	–	3	5	–	3
Morrisville*	2	–	4	4	–	5
Alfred State	1	–	5	4	–	6
Dean	1	–	5	2	–	7
$ – Conference champion; * missing final score of game vs Cornell JV

1999 Northeast Football Conference standings
	Conf.			Overall
Team	W		L	W		L
Dean +	4	–	2	7	–	2
Canton +	4	–	2	5	–	3
Morrisville +	4	–	2	6	–	4
Cayuga	3	–	3	6	–	4
Lackawanna	3	–	3	6	–	5
Hudson Valley	3	–	3	4	–	4
Alfred State	0	–	6	3	–	6
+ – Conference co-champions

2000 Northeast Football Conference standings
	Conf.			Overall
Team	W		L	W		L
Lackawanna $	5	–	0	10	–	1
Hudson Valley	3	–	2	6	–	3
Alfred State	2	–	3	5	–	4
Morrisville	2	–	3	5	–	5
Dean	2	–	3	4	–	4
Canton	1	–	4	5	–	4
$ – Conference champion

2001 Northeast Football Conference standings
	Conf.			Overall
Team	W		L	W		L
Lackawanna $	5	–	0	10	–	1
Erie	4	–	1	5	–	1
Hudson Valley	4	–	1	6	–	2
Morrisville	2	–	3	4	–	4
Canton	2	–	4	4	–	4
Dean	1	–	4	1	–	6
Alfred State	0	–	6	1	–	9
$ – Conference champion

2002 Northeast Football Conference standings
	Conf.			Overall
Team	W		L	W		L
Morrisville $	5	–	0	9	–	2
Erie	4	–	1	7	–	3
Alfred State	3	–	3	5	–	5
Hudson Valley	2	–	3	4	–	5
Dean	2	–	3	3	–	7
Canton	0	–	6	0	–	9
$ – Conference champion

2003 Northeast Football Conference standings
	Conf.			Overall
Team	W		L	W		L
Erie $	5	–	1	7	–	3
Hudson Valley	4	–	1	8	–	2
Lackawanna	3	–	1	8	–	3
Morrisville	4	–	2	7	–	4
Alfred State	3	–	4	7	–	4
Dean	1	–	4	2	–	7
Canton	0	–	7	1	–	9
$ – Conference champion

2004 Northeast Football Conference standings
	Conf.			Overall
Team	W		L	W		L
Erie y	7	–	1	7	–	4
Hudson Valley y$	5	–	2	8	–	3
Nassau	5	–	3	7	–	3
Morrisville	4	–	4	5	–	4
Lackawanna	1	–	2	3	–	7
Alfred State	1	–	6	4	–	6
Dean	0	–	6	1	–	7
Championship: Hudson Valley 23, Erie 22
$ – Conference champion; y – Championship game participant

2005 Northeast Football Conference standings
	Conf.			Overall
Team	W		L	W		L
Nassau $	8	–	1	9	–	2
Dean	5	–	3	6	–	4
Hudson Valley	3	–	4	6	–	4
Erie	4	–	5	5	–	6
Morrisville	3	–	5	5	–	5
Lackawanna	1	–	2	5	–	3
Alfred State	2	–	5	5	–	5
$ – Conference champion

2006 Northeast Football Conference standings
	Conf.			Overall
Team	W		L	W		L
Nassau	4	–	1	8	–	2
Erie	4	–	1	7	–	2
Dean	3	–	2	7	–	3
Hudson Valley	3	–	2	6	–	3
Alfred State	1	–	4	5	–	5
Lackawanna*	0	–	5	1	–	9
Lackawanna finished the 2006 season 9–1 but had to forfeit their conference championship and eight wins, including their Valley of the Sun win, due to an ineligible player.

2007 Northeast Football Conference standings
	Conf.			Overall
Team	W		L	W		L
Dean $	4	–	1	9	–	1
Lackawanna	3	–	2	7	–	3
Nassau	3	–	2	7	–	3
Erie	3	–	2	7	–	3
Hudson Valley	2	–	3	5	–	5
Alfred State	0	–	5	3	–	7
$ – Conference champion

2008 Northeast Football Conference standings
	Conf.			Overall
Team	W		L	W		L
Dean $	5	–	0	10	–	1
Nassau	4	–	1	6	–	4
Lackawanna	3	–	2	7	–	4
Erie	2	–	3	4	–	6
Hudson Valley	1	–	4	3	–	6
Alfred State	0	–	5	4	–	5
$ – Conference champion

2009 Northeast Football Conference standings
	Conf.			Overall
Team	W		L	W		L
Dean $	4	–	1	9	–	2
Nassau	3	–	2	8	–	2
Lackawanna	3	–	2	5	–	4
Hudson Valley	2	–	3	5	–	5
Erie	2	–	3	4	–	6
Alfred State	1	–	4	5	–	5
$ – Conference champion; Hudson Valley forfeited their games against Alfred State and Globe Tech

2010 Northeast Football Conference standings
	Conf.			Overall
Team	W		L	W		L
Nassau $	6	–	0	11	–	0
Lackawanna	4	–	2	9	–	2
ASA Brooklyn	4	–	2	7	–	3
Dean	3	–	3	6	–	4
Erie	2	–	4	2	–	7
Alfred State	1	–	5	4	–	6
Hudson Valley	1	–	5	3	–	6
$ – Conference champion

2011 Northeast Football Conference standings
	Conf.			Overall
Team	W		L	W		L
Dean $	6	–	0	8	–	1
Nassau	5	–	1	8	–	2
Lackawanna	3	–	3	7	–	4
ASA Brooklyn	3	–	3	4	–	4
Louisburg	3	–	3	7	–	3
Erie	1	–	5	2	–	8
Hudson Valley	0	–	6	0	–	8
$ – Conference champion

2012 Northeast Football Conference standings
	Conf.			Overall
Team	W		L	W		L
ASA Brooklyn $	5	–	0	9	–	1
Nassau	5	–	1	9	–	2
Dean	4	–	2	7	–	3
Louisburg	3	–	2	6	–	3
Lackawanna	2	–	4	5	–	5
Erie	1	–	5	2	–	6
Hudson Valley	0	–	6	2	–	9
Monroe #		–		2	–	6
$ – Conference champion; # – Probationary year

2013 Northeast Football Conference standings
	Conf.			Overall
Team	W		L	W		L
No. 7 ASA Brooklyn $	5	–	0	9	–	1
No. 15 Nassau	4	–	1	9	–	2
Monroe	2	–	3	7	–	3
Louisburg	2	–	3	5	–	4
Dean	1	–	4	6	–	4
Lackawanna	1	–	4	4	–	6
$ – Conference champion; Rankings from NJCAA poll

2014 Northeast Football Conference standings
	Conf.			Overall
Team	W		L	W		L
Nassau $	5	–	0	10	–	0
ASA Brooklyn	4	–	1	6	–	2
Dean	2	–	3	6	–	4
Lackawanna	2	–	3	5	–	5
Monroe	2	–	4	4	–	5
Louisburg	0	–	5	1	–	9
$ – Conference champion

2015 Northeast Football Conference standings
	Conf.			Overall
Team	W		L	W		L
No. 12 Lackawanna $	4	–	0	8	–	2
ASA Brooklyn	2	–	2	6	–	5
Dean	2	–	2	6	–	3
Monroe	1	–	3	3	–	6
Nassau	1	–	3	3	–	6
$ – Conference champion; Rankings from NJCAA poll

2016 Northeast Football Conference standings
	Conf.			Overall
Team	W		L	W		L
No. 8 Lackawanna $	2	–	0	10	–	1
Monroe	1	–	1	7	–	2
ASA Brooklyn	0	–	2	4	–	6
$ – Conference champion; Rankings from NJCAA poll

2017 Northeast Football Conference standings
	Conf.			Overall
Team	W		L	W		L
No. 14 ASA Brooklyn $	2	–	0	9	–	1
No. 19 Lackawanna	1	–	1	7	–	2
Monroe	0	–	2	8	–	2
$ – Conference champion; Rankings from NJCAA poll

2018 Northeast Football Conference standings
	Conf.			Overall
Team	W		L	W		L
No. 6 Lackawanna $	2	–	0	11	–	0
No. 16 Monroe	1	–	1	7	–	2
ASA Brooklyn	0	–	2	6	–	3
$ – Conference champion; Rankings from NJCAA poll

2019 Northeast Football Conference standings
	Conf.			Overall
Team	W		L	W		L
No. 2 Lackawanna $^	2	–	0	10	–	1
No. 15 ASA Brooklyn	1	–	1	8	–	2
No. 19 Monroe	0	–	2	8	–	3
$ – Conference champion; ^ – NJCAA National Championship participant; Rankings from NJCAA poll

2020–21 Northeast Football Conference standings
	Conf.			Overall
Team	W		L	W		L
Lackawanna	0	–	0	1	–	1

2021 Northeast Football Conference standings
	Conf.			Overall
Team	W		L	W		L
No. 10 Monroe $	1	–	0	10	–	1
Lackawanna	0	–	1	7	–	3
$ – Conference champion; Rankings from NJCAA Division I poll

2022 Northeast Football Conference standings
	Conf.			Overall
Team	W		L	W		L
No. 13 Lackawanna $	2	–	0	7	–	3
Monroe	0	–	2	3	–	5
$ – Conference champion; Rankings from NJCAA Division I poll

2023 Northeast Football Conference standings
	Conf.			Overall
Team	W		L	W		L
No. 14 Lackawanna $	2	–	0	7	–	3
Monroe	0	–	2	6	–	5
$ – Conference champion; Rankings from NJCAA Division I poll

2024 Northeast Football Conference standings
	Conf.			Overall
Team	W		L	W		L
No. 11 Lackawanna $	2	–	0	7	–	3
Monroe	0	–	2	5	–	5
$ – Conference champion; Rankings from NJCAA Division I poll

2025 Northeast Football Conference standings
	Conf.			Overall
Team	W		L	W		L
Monroe +	1	–	1	5	–	4
Lackawanna +	1	–	1	3	–	6
+ – Conference co-champions; Rankings from AP Poll
