= Chauncey Rivers =

American football player (born 1997)

Profile
- Position: Linebacker

Personal information
- Born: June 12, 1997 (age 29); Stone Mountain, Georgia, U.S.
- Listed height: 6 ft 2 in (1.88 m)
- Listed weight: 259 lb (117 kg)

Career information
- High school: Stephenson (DeKalb County, Georgia)
- College: Georgia (2015); East Mississippi CC (2016); Mississippi State (2017–2019)
- NFL draft: 2020: undrafted

Career history
- Baltimore Ravens (2020); Green Bay Packers (2021); Houston Roughnecks (2023); DC Defenders (2024)*; Birmingham Stallions (2024)*; Winnipeg Blue Bombers (2024)*
- * Offseason or practice squad member only

Awards and highlights
- Second-team All-SEC (2019)

Career NFL statistics
- Total tackles: 2
- Stats at Pro Football Reference

Chauncey Rivers (born June 12, 1997) is an American professional football linebacker. He played college football for the Georgia Bulldogs and Mississippi State Bulldogs, as well as junior college football for the East Mississippi Lions.

Undrafted in the 2020 NFL draft, Rivers has played two seasons in the National Football League (NFL), as a member of the Baltimore Ravens and Green Bay Packers.

== College career ==
=== Georgia ===
As a freshman in 2015, Rivers played in four games totaling four tackles on the season. After being arrested on marijuana charges for the third time in seven months, Rivers was dismissed from the team.

=== East Mississippi ===
Rivers transferred to East Mississippi Community College. While at East Mississippi, he was featured in the second season of the Netflix documentary series Last Chance U, where he played under head coach Buddy Stephens. After playing in 12 games for the Lions, Rivers totaled 25 solo tackles and 20 assists for a total of 45, along with eight sacks for a loss of 44 yards.

=== Mississippi State ===
After his 2016 campaign at East Mississippi, Rivers was considered to be among the top junior college defensive ends in the country. This allowed him to get consideration once again from Division I colleges. After enrolling at Mississippi State University, Rivers received an academic redshirt for the 2017 season.

During his 2018 season, as a redshirt junior, Rivers played in all 13 games the team played, totaling 339 snaps. Rivers made 24 tackles and miss just 1 tackle on the season. Despite not being a starter, Rivers finished fifth on the team in tackles for loss with seven and had 2.5 sacks as well as 19 pressures.

== Professional career ==
Pre-draft measurables
Height	Weight	Arm length	Hand span	40-yard dash	10-yard split	20-yard split	20-yard shuttle	Three-cone drill	Vertical jump	Broad jump	Bench press
6 ft 2 in (1.88 m)	262 lb (119 kg)	32 7/8 in (0.84 m)	9 3/4 in (0.25 m)	4.97 s	1.80 s	2.93 s	4.70 s	7.33 s	30.5 in (0.77 m)	8 ft 10 in (2.69 m)	20 reps
All values from NFL Combine

=== Baltimore Ravens ===
Rivers was signed by the Baltimore Ravens as an undrafted free agent following the 2020 NFL draft. He was waived during final roster cuts on September 5, 2020, and signed to the team's practice squad the next day. He was elevated to the active roster on December 2 for the team's week 12 game against the Pittsburgh Steelers, and reverted to the practice squad after the game. On January 18, 2021, Rivers signed a reserve/futures contract with the Ravens. He was waived on August 4, 2021.

=== Green Bay Packers ===
On August 5, 2021, Rivers was claimed off waivers by the Green Bay Packers. On August 31, Rivers made the Packers' initial 53-man roster. He was placed on injured reserve on October 7, with a torn ACL.

=== Houston Roughnecks ===
On November 17, 2022, Rivers was drafted by the Houston Roughnecks of the XFL. The Roughnecks brand was transferred to the Houston Gamblers when the XFL and USFL merged to create the United Football League (UFL).

=== DC Defenders ===
On February 28, 2024, Rivers signed with the DC Defenders of the United Football League (UFL).

=== Birmingham Stallions ===
On March 8, 2024, Rivers was traded to the Birmingham Stallions in exchange for offensive tackle Jahmir Johnson. He was waived on March 22, 2024.

=== Winnipeg Blue Bombers ===
On April 11, 2024, Rivers signed with the Winnipeg Blue Bombers of the Canadian Football League (CFL).

Rivers was released on June 2, 2024.

== Career statistics ==
=== NFL ===
Year	Team	GP	GS	Tackles					Interceptions						Fumbles	
Year	Team	GP	GS	Total	Solo	Ast	Sck	SFTY	PDef	Int	Yds	Avg	Lng	TDs	FF	FR
2020	BAL	1	0	0	0	0	0	0	0	0	0	0	0	0	0	0
2021	GB	4	0	2	2	0	0	0	0	0	0	0	0	0	0	0
Total		5	0	2	2	0	0	0	0	0	0	0	0	0	0	0
Source: NFL.com

=== College ===
Year	Team	GP	Tackles					Interceptions					Fumbles			
Year	Team	GP	Solo	Ast	Total	Loss	Sack	Int	Yards	Avg	TD	PD	FR	Yards	TD	FF
2015	Georgia	2	3	1	4	1.0	0.0	0	0	0.0	0	0	0	0	0	0
2016	East Mississippi	12	25	20	45	3.8	8.0	0	0	0.0	0	0	0	0	0	1
2017	Mississippi State	(redshirt) Redshirted														
2018	Mississippi State	13	8	16	24	7.5	3.0	0	0	0.0	0	0	0	0	0	0
2019	Mississippi State	13	24	19	43	8.0	5.0	0	0	0.0	0	3	0	0	0	1
Career		40	60	56	116	20.3	16.0	0	0	0.00	0	3	0	0	0	2
