= C. J. Reavis =

American gridiron football player (born 1995)

C.J. Reavis
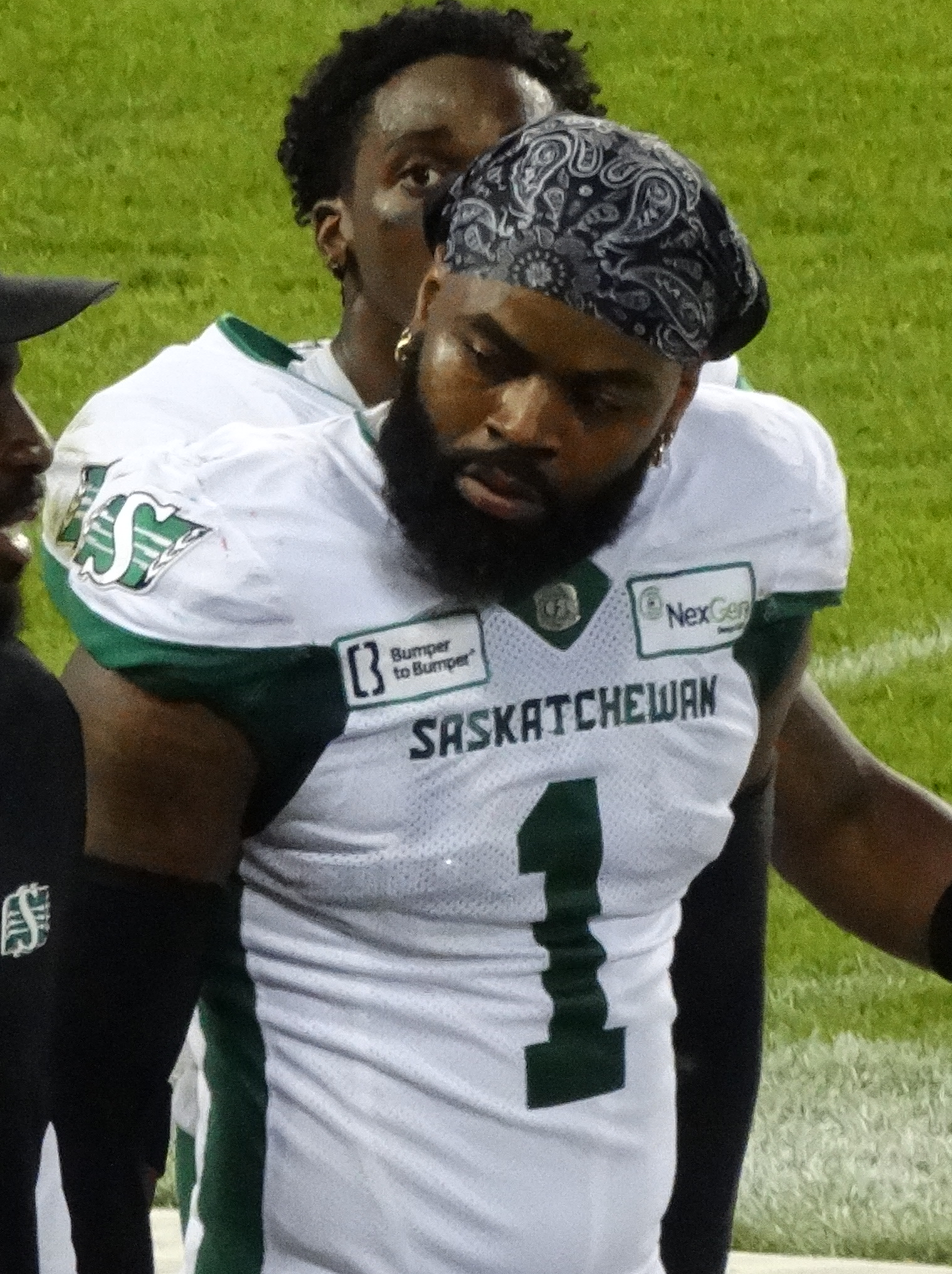
- Reavis with the Saskatchewan Roughriders in 2024

No. 8 – Ottawa Redblacks
- Position: Defensive back
- Roster status: Active
- CFL status: American

Personal information
- Born: November 27, 1995 (age 30); Chester, Virginia, U.S.
- Listed height: 6 ft 0 in (1.83 m)
- Listed weight: 198 lb (90 kg)

Career information
- High school: Thomas Dale (Chester, Virginia)
- College: Virginia Tech (2014); East Mississippi CC (2015); Marshall (2016–2017)
- NFL draft: 2018: undrafted

Career history
- Jacksonville Jaguars (2018); Atlanta Falcons (2019–2020)*; Saskatchewan Roughriders (2022–2025); Ottawa Redblacks (2026–present)
- * Offseason or practice squad member only

Awards and highlights
- Grey Cup champion (2025); 2× CFL All-Star (2024, 2025); 2× CFL West All-Star (2024, 2025)

Career NFL statistics
- Total tackles: 1
- Stats at Pro Football Reference

Career CFL statistics as of 2025
- Total tackles: 220
- Sacks: 9
- Interceptions: 2
- Fumbles: 6
- Stats at CFL.ca

Cary Sidney "C. J." Reavis II (born November 27, 1995) is an American professional football defensive back for the Ottawa Redblacks of the Canadian Football League (CFL). He played college football for the Virginia Tech Hokies and Marshall Thundering Herd. He also played junior college football for the East Mississippi Lions.

== Early life ==
Reavis was born in and grew up in Chester, Virginia and attended Thomas Dale High School. He was rated as a four star recruit by 247Sports and Rivals.com, who also rated him 20th athlete nationally and 250th-ranked college prospect overall for his class. He committed to play college football at Virginia Tech over offers from Tennessee, North Carolina, Ohio State, Oklahoma, Nebraska and Virginia.

== College career ==
Reavis began his college career at Virginia Tech with the Virginia Tech Hokies, playing mostly on special teams as a freshman and recording eight total tackles. He was slated to enter the Hokies starting lineup as a sophomore, but was ultimately dismissed from the university going into his sophomore year due to an unspecified student conduct violation. He then transferred to East Mississippi Community College, and in his only season, Reavis recorded 40 tackles, eight passes broken up and two interceptions. While at East Mississippi, he was featured in the first season of the Netflix documentary series Last Chance U, where he played under head coach Buddy Stephens. Following the season, Reavis transferred to Marshall University to play for the Marshall Thundering Herd. Over the course of his two seasons at Marshall, Reavis recorded 132 tackles and an interception in 21 games played.

== Professional career ==
Pre-draft measurables
| Height | Weight | Arm length | Hand span | Wingspan | 40-yard dash | 10-yard split | 20-yard split | 20-yard shuttle | Three-cone drill | Vertical jump | Broad jump | Bench press |
|---|---|---|---|---|---|---|---|---|---|---|---|---|
| 6 ft 0 3/8 in (1.84 m) | 203 lb (92 kg) | 31 1/4 in (0.79 m) | 8 1/2 in (0.22 m) | 6 ft 3 3/8 in (1.91 m) | 4.58 s | 1.56 s | 2.66 s | 4.37 s | 7.14 s | 32.5 in (0.83 m) | 9 ft 11 in (3.02 m) | 12 reps |
All values from Pro Day

=== Jacksonville Jaguars ===
Reavis signed with the Jacksonville Jaguars as an undrafted free agent on April 28, 2018. Reavis failed to make the 53-man roster out of training camp and was subsequently re-signed to the Jaguars' practice squad on September 2. Reavis was promoted to the Jaguars' active roster on November 27 – his 23rd birthday. Reavis made his NFL debut on December 2, recording one tackle. Reavis played in four games for the Jaguars during his rookie season, making one tackle.

Reavis was waived by the Jaguars during final roster cuts on August 31, 2019.

=== Atlanta Falcons ===
The Atlanta Falcons signed Reavis to their practice squad on November 5, 2019. On December 30, Reavis was signed to a reserve/future contract. On August 13, 2020, he was waived by the Falcons.

=== Saskatchewan Roughriders ===
Reavis was signed by the Saskatchewan Roughriders of the Canadian Football League on April 1, 2022. He became a free agent upon the expiry of his contract on February 10, 2026.

=== Ottawa Redblacks ===
On February 10, 2026, it was announced that Reavis had signed with the Ottawa Redblacks.
