= Charles Baldwin (American football) =

American football player (born 1994)

No. 70
- Position: Tackle

Personal information
- Born: May 28, 1994 (age 32); Windsor, Connecticut, U.S.
- Listed height: 6 ft 4 in (1.93 m)
- Listed weight: 305 lb (138 kg)

Career information
- High school: Windsor
- College: ASA College (2014-2015); Alabama (2016); Kansas (2016-2017); Youngstown State (2018)
- NFL draft: 2019: undrafted

Career history
- BC Lions (2019–2020); Pittsburgh Maulers (2022–2023); New Jersey Generals (2023)*
- * Offseason or practice squad member only

Charles Baldwin (born May 28, 1994) is an American former football tackle who played college football for Alabama, Kansas and Youngstown State.

== Early life ==
Baldwin attended Windsor High School in Windsor, Connecticut. In 2013 he was selected on the Connecticut Class-L All-State team and All-Courant Offensive Team.

== College career ==
After high school, Baldwin went the junior college route and played for ASA College. He received second-team NJCAA All-America honors in 2015. He was a five star recruit coming out of JUCO with offers from Virginia Tech, South Carolina, Mississippi, Michigan State, Miami (FL), Georgia, Connecticut and Alabama. He committed to Alabama in June 2015.

Baldwin spent the spring of 2016 at Alabama but sat out the regular season and transferred to Kansas. He did not play at Kansas either. In December 2017, he entered the transfer portal again and transferred to Youngstown State for the 2018 season.

== Professional career ==
He went undrafted in the 2019 NFL draft. In September 2019, he signed a future contract in the Canadian Football League with the BC Lions. He played there in the 2020 season and became a free agent after. He was drafted in the 2022 USFL draft by the Pittsburgh Maulers in the seventh round as the first pick. He played with the Maulers in the 2022 and 2023 season but was cut on May 23, 2023. In November 2023, he signed with the New Jersey Generals, but only a month after signing, the XFL merged with the USFL and the Generals were folded.
