= Bull Sullivan =

American football player and coach (1918–1970)

Biographical details
- Born: December 10, 1918; Echola, Alabama, U.S.
- Died: September 8, 1970 (aged 51); Columbus, Mississippi, U.S.
- Education: Peabody College (BS); Mississippi State University (MS)

Playing career
- 1941–1942: Union (TN)
- 1946: Nevada
- Positions: Center, Linebacker

Coaching career (HC unless noted)
- 1948–1949: Oregon (assistant)
- 1950–1952: East Mississippi
- 1956–1969: East Mississippi

Head coaching record
- Overall: 97–62–3

Robert Victor "Bull" "Cyclone" Sullivan (December 10, 1918 – September 8, 1970) was an American college football coach. He served as the head football coach at East Mississippi Community College for 16 seasons, from 1950 to 1952 and again from 1956 to 1969. He was inducted into the Mississippi Sports Hall of Fame, and profiled in the 1984 Sports Illustrated article "The Toughest Coach There Ever Was". He was also the subject of the book Bull Cyclone Sullivan and the Lions of Scooba, Mississippi.
