= Union University Bulldogs =

Intercollegiate sports teams of Union University

- University: Union University
- Conference: Gulf South
- NCAA: Division II
- Athletic director: Mark Campbell
- Location: Jackson, Tennessee
- Varsity teams: 11 (5 men's, 6 women's)
- Basketball arena: Fred DeLay Gymnasium
- Baseball stadium: Fesmire Baseball Field
- Softball stadium: Fesmire Softball Field
- Soccer stadium: Smith Memorial Soccer Complex
- Mascot: Buster the Bulldog
- Nickname: Bulldogs
- Website: uuathletics.com
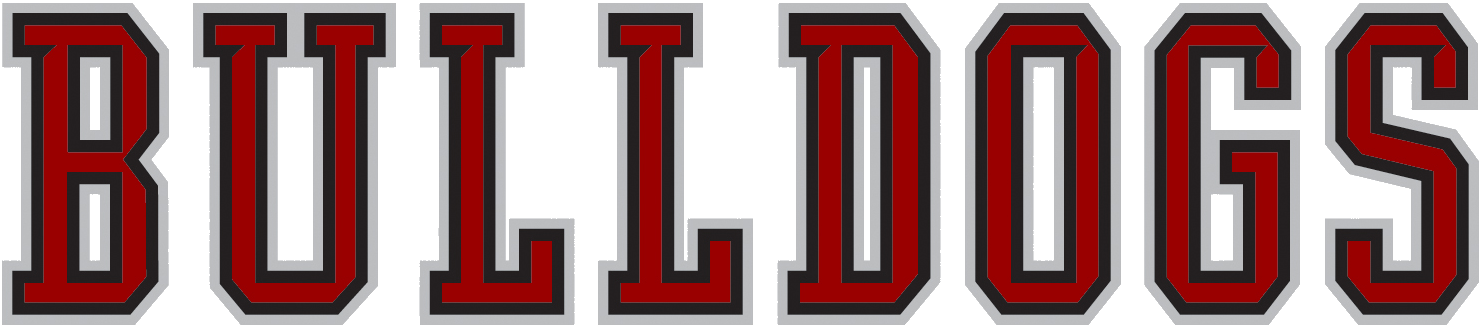

The Union University Bulldogs are the athletic teams that represent Union University, located in Jackson, Tennessee, in intercollegiate sports at the Division II ranks of the National Collegiate Athletic Association (NCAA). The Bulldogs have primarily competed in the Gulf South Conference since the 2012–13 academic year.

Union University competes in eleven intercollegiate varsity sports. Men's sports include baseball, basketball, cross country, golf, and soccer; while women's sports include basketball, cross country, golf, soccer, softball, and volleyball.

== Conference affiliations ==
NAIA

- TranSouth Athletic Conference (1996–2012)

NCAA

- Gulf South Conference (2012–present)

Union began the three-year transition to full NCAA Division II membership in 2011. They were also a member of the National Christian College Athletic Association (NCCAA), primarily competing as an independent in the Mid-East Region of the Division I level.

== Varsity teams ==
Men's sports	Women's sports
Baseball	Basketball
Basketball	Cross country
Cross country	Golf
Golf	Soccer
Soccer	Softball
	Volleyball

Former sports include cheerleading and football.

== History ==
=== Championships ===
The women's basketball team won NAIA national championships during the 1998, 2005, 2006, 2009, and 2010 seasons.

Union also claimed NCCAA National Titles in men's soccer (2003), volleyball (2003), and softball (2001, 2002, 2004, 2013).

== Notable alumni ==
=== Football ===
- Bull Sullivan

=== Men's soccer ===
- Kris Ward
