= Dakota Allen =

American football player (born 1995)

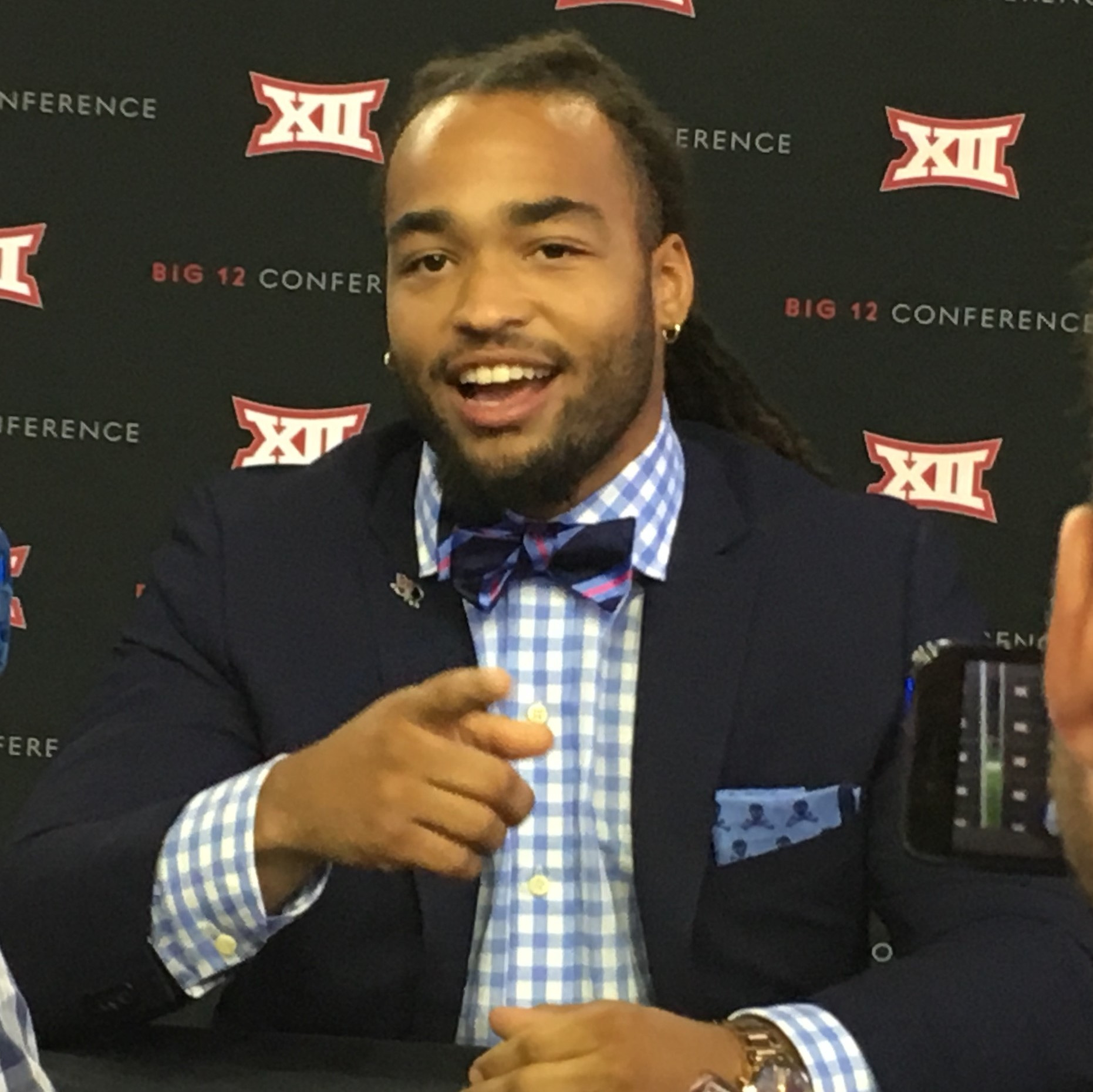
- Allen at 2018 Big 12 Media Days

No. 51, 53, 56, 59
- Position: Linebacker

Personal information
- Born: November 2, 1995 (age 31); Dallas, Texas, U.S.
- Listed height: 6 ft 1 in (1.85 m)
- Listed weight: 232 lb (105 kg)

Career information
- High school: Summer Creek (Houston, Texas)
- College: Texas Tech (2015, 2017–2018); East Mississippi CC (2016)
- NFL draft: 2019: 7th round, 251st overall pick

Career history
- Los Angeles Rams (2019)*; Oakland Raiders (2019); Los Angeles Rams (2019)*; Jacksonville Jaguars (2019–2021); Cleveland Browns (2022); Denver Broncos (2022)
- * Offseason or practice squad member only

Awards and highlights
- First-team All-Big 12 (2018); Second-team All-Big 12 (2017)

Career NFL statistics
- Total tackles: 30
- Forced fumbles: 1
- Stats at Pro Football Reference

Dakota Devon Allen (born November 2, 1995) is an American former professional football player who was a linebacker for four seasons in the National Football League (NFL). He played college football for the Texas Tech Red Raiders. He also played junior college football for the East Mississippi Lions. Allen was selected by the Los Angeles Rams in the seventh round of the 2019 NFL draft. Dakota is now a coach for the SFL football league in Houston Texas.

== Early life ==
Allen was born in Dallas, Texas, and grew up in Humble, Texas. He attended Summer Creek High School and was a standout football player for the Bulldogs. As a senior, he recorded 112 tackles and three interceptions and was named the Defensive MVP of District 19-4A. He committed to play college football for the Texas Tech Red Raiders over offers from Oklahoma, TCU, Kansas State, and Iowa State.

== College career ==
Allen began his collegiate career at Texas Tech University, redshirting his freshman season. As a redshirt freshman, Allen was the second-leading tackler with 87 stops for the Texas Tech Red Raiders. After the end of the season, he was charged with second-degree burglary along with two teammates and ultimately expelled from Texas Tech. All charges were eventually dropped against Allen after agreeing to enter a pre-trial diversionary program.

Following his dismissal, he transferred to East Mississippi Community College. While at East Mississippi, he was featured in the second season of the Netflix documentary series Last Chance U, where he played under head coach Buddy Stephens. Allen recorded a team leading 117 tackles with two sacks, an interception, a forced fumble, a fumble recovery and five pass breakups. Despite success on the field early in the season, he only originally received scholarship offers from Bowling Green and Troy due to his previous arrest. Allen later received offers from Ole Miss, Mississippi State and Marshall, but opted to return to Texas Tech to finish his collegiate career.

Allen had a breakout junior season in 2017, with 92 tackles, 12 tackles for loss, and six forced turnovers. He was subsequently named to the All-Big 12 Conference by Pro Football Focus and to the second-team All-Big 12 by coaches and media. As a senior, Allen made 73 total tackles, including 6.5 for loss, and was named first-team All-Big 12.

== Professional career ==
Pre-draft measurables
Height	Weight	Arm length	Hand span	40-yard dash	10-yard split	20-yard split	20-yard shuttle	Three-cone drill	Vertical jump	Broad jump	Bench press
6 ft 0 3/4 in (1.85 m)	232 lb (105 kg)	31 1/4 in (0.79 m)	9 1/4 in (0.23 m)	4.77 s	1.67 s	2.77 s	4.04 s	6.88 s	34.5 in (0.88 m)	9 ft 11 in (3.02 m)	23 reps
All values from NFL Combine/Pro Day

=== Los Angeles Rams (first stint) ===
Allen was selected by the Los Angeles Rams in the seventh round (251st overall) of the 2019 NFL draft. Allen signed a four-year $2,594,288 contract with a signing bonus of $74,288 on June 7, 2019. He was waived during final roster cuts on August 31, but was signed to the practice squad the following day.

=== Oakland Raiders ===
On September 24, 2019, Allen was signed by the Oakland Raiders off the Rams practice squad. Allen made his NFL debut on October 6 against the Chicago Bears, playing eight snaps on special teams. He was waived on October 30 after appearing in two games for the Raiders.

=== Los Angeles Rams (second stint) ===
On November 4, 2019, Allen was signed to the Rams practice squad.

=== Jacksonville Jaguars ===
On December 10, 2019, Allen was signed by the Jacksonville Jaguars off the Rams practice squad. After appearing mostly in the field goal defense. Allen replaced starter Myles Jack in week 4 of the 2020 NFL season during the second half of the game against the Cincinnati Bengals. In 2020, Allen played in 13 games with the Jaguars, he started two and played mostly on special teams. He has 14 tackles (nine solo), four special teams tackles and three loss tackles this season.

Allen signed an exclusive-rights free agent tender with the Jaguars on April 15, 2021.

=== Cleveland Browns ===
On June 21, 2022, Allen signed with the Cleveland Browns. Allen was waived by the Browns on August 30. The Browns signed Allen to their practice squad on August 31. He was signed to the active roster on October 15. He was waived three days later.

=== Denver Broncos ===
On November 22, 2022, Allen was signed by the Denver Broncos off the Browns practice squad. On December 19, Allen was placed on season–ending injured reserve. He became a free agent after the 2022 season.

== Personal life ==
Allen is the son of Stacey Hawkins and Keith Allen. His father played collegiate football as a running back at the University of Texas at Austin.
