= Rehabilitation assistant =

Rehabilitation Assistants (RAs), also referred to as occupational therapist assistants (OTAs) and physiotherapist assistants (PTAs) are members of the health care team who work under the supervision of an occupational therapist or a physiotherapist to improve a client's or patient's quality of life.

== Scope of Practice ==
In British Columbia, Canada rehabilitation assistants are not allowed to assess clients but can modify treatment plans set by the physiotherapist and/or occupational therapist.

== Education ==
Preferred education in Canada is the completion of a 2-year full-time diploma from an accredited rehabilitation assistant program.

== Responsibilities ==
- Implementing the rehabilitation program as directed by physiotherapist or occupational therapist
- Teaching group and individual exercise programs
- Wheelchair mobility training
- Instructing patients in self care and instrumental activities of daily living
- Assisting in making, modifying, and adapting self-help devices and equipment.
- Application of hot or cold modalities as instructed

== Areas of Practice ==
- Acute Care
- Rehabilitation Centres
- Mental Health
- Extended Care
- Private Practice
- Community Health
- School District

== See also ==
- Occupational therapist
- Physiotherapist
