= ASA College =

College in New York and Florida, US

Coordinates: 40.6929°N 73.9859°W

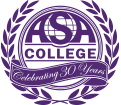
- Type: Private for-profit college
- Active: 1985–2023
- Faculty: Faculty total:290 (60 full-time / 230 part-time)
- Undergraduates: Over 4,500
- Location: New York City and Hialeah, Florida, United States
- Campus: Urban
- Website: June 2022 Archive

ASA College was a private for-profit college in New York City and Hialeah, Florida. The college had three campuses: Midtown Manhattan and Downtown Brooklyn in New York, and Hialeah in Florida. It offered associate degrees, bachelor's degrees, and professional certificates in the divisions of business administration, health disciplines, legal studies, and computer technology. Although it was accredited by the Middle States Commission on Higher Education, that accreditation was removed in 2023 as the college failed to meet several of the commission's standards. The institution closed on March 1, 2023.

== History ==
ASA was founded in 1985 with one campus location in Manhattan, New York. Known then as Advanced Software Analysis, the college focused on computer programming, as New York had a dire shortage of qualified mainframe programmers at that time.

In 1999, ASA received authorization from the New York State Board of Regents to confer degrees in accounting, computer programming, information technology, and medical assisting.

The college's president, Alex Shchegol, was removed by the college's board of trustees in 2018 after multiple allegations of sexual misconduct that resulted in over $2 million in out-of-court settlements. After the board denied his request in late 2021 to be reinstated, he used his power as owner of the college to replace five of the seven members of the board of trustees, and they reinstated him.

In 2022, the U.S. Department of Education began to restrict the college's access to federal financial aid. Later that year, the college's accreditor, the Middle States Commission on Higher Education, announced its intention to stop accrediting the college in 2023. After being accused of "running misleading ads targeting low-income people and immigrants", ASA College agreed to pay over $100,000 to New York City's consumer protection division. It is also the subject of a class-action lawsuit by employees alleging that the college has not paid them. The Middle States Commission on Higher Education said that the college would close on February 24, 2023, and while initially, the college disputed the claim, its last day of operation was March 1, 2023.

Degree conferring authority was officially revoked by the New York State Education Department on July 25, 2024.

== Accreditations and approvals ==
ASA College was authorized by the New York State Board of Regents to confer Associate of Occupational Studies and Associate in Applied Science degrees. ASA's associate degree program in Medical Assisting was accredited by the Commission on Accreditation of Allied Health Education Programs upon the recommendation of the Curriculum Review Board of the American Association of Medical Assistants Endowment.

The college was formerly accredited by the Middle States Commission on Higher Education, until its removal in 2023 for failing to meet several of the commission's accreditation standards.

== Athletics ==
In 2008, ASA College launched their Athletic program out of their Brooklyn campus known as the Avengers. Starting with a small basketball team, the athletic department expanded to 13 sports programs combined over the three campuses: including men's & women's soccer, varsity & JV football, men & women's basketball, baseball, men's lacrosse, men's & women's track & field and men's & women's tennis. All programs were members of the National Junior College Athletic Association (NJCAA) Division I, Region XV.

ASA Brooklyn, known as the Avengers, had four sports teams: men's & women's basketball, baseball, and football. ASA Manhattan, known as the Mad Titans, had one sports team, men's basketball. There were plans to add women's basketball, but they never came to fruition before the college's closure. ASA Miami, known as the Silver Storm, had 13 sports teams: men's & women's soccer, football, men & women's basketball, baseball, cheerleading, men's lacrosse, softball, men & women's track & field, and men & women's tennis.

=== Accomplishments ===
ASA NY's football program played their first season in 2009 and gained recognition during their 2012–2013 season after being ranked #5 nationally and earning a Carrier Bowl bid against Snow College. During the 2017 season, ASA NY ranked 14th by the NJCAA with a 9–1 regular-season record. ASA NY earned an invite to the Valley of the Sun Bowl in Mesa, Arizona and came away victorious over Mesa Community College 28–23.

The ASA Miami football program began in 2015 and was the only junior college football program in the state of Florida before ASA's closure in 2023.

Head tennis coach Brian Slack won seven NJCAA National Championships with ASA College, four on the men's side and three on the women's side.

== Notable alumni ==
- Charles Baldwin, college football player
- Eddy Piñeiro, professional football player
- Teair Tart, professional football player

== See also ==
- List of defunct colleges and universities in New York
