= Lackawanna College =

Private college in Scranton, Pennsylvania, US

Coordinates: 41.41133°N 75.65887°W

- Former names: Scranton Business College (1894–1912); Lackawanna Business College (1902–1912); Scranton Lackawanna Business College (1912–1957); Lackawanna Junior College (1957–2001)
- Motto: Spes sibis quisque (Latin)
- Motto in English: "Let each be a hope unto himself"
- Type: Private college
- Established: 1894; 132 years ago
- Accreditation: MSCHE
- Endowment: $10.0 million (2023)
- President: Jill Murray
- Provost: Erica Barone Pricci
- Faculty: 68
- Students: 2,043
- Location: Scranton, Pennsylvania, United States
- Campus: 4 acres (1.6 ha); Small city
- Other campuses: Covington Township; Hawley; Hazleton; Sunbury; Towanda; Tunkhannock
- Colors: Navy blue, gray, and white
- Nickname: Falcons
- Sporting affiliations: NJCAA – Region XIX
- Mascot: Elsie
- Website: www.lackawanna.edu

Lackawanna College (Lackawanna or LC) is a private college in Scranton, Pennsylvania, United States. It also has satellite centers in Hawley, Hazleton, Sunbury, Towanda, and Tunkhannock, and an Environmental Education Center in Covington Township.

== Academics ==
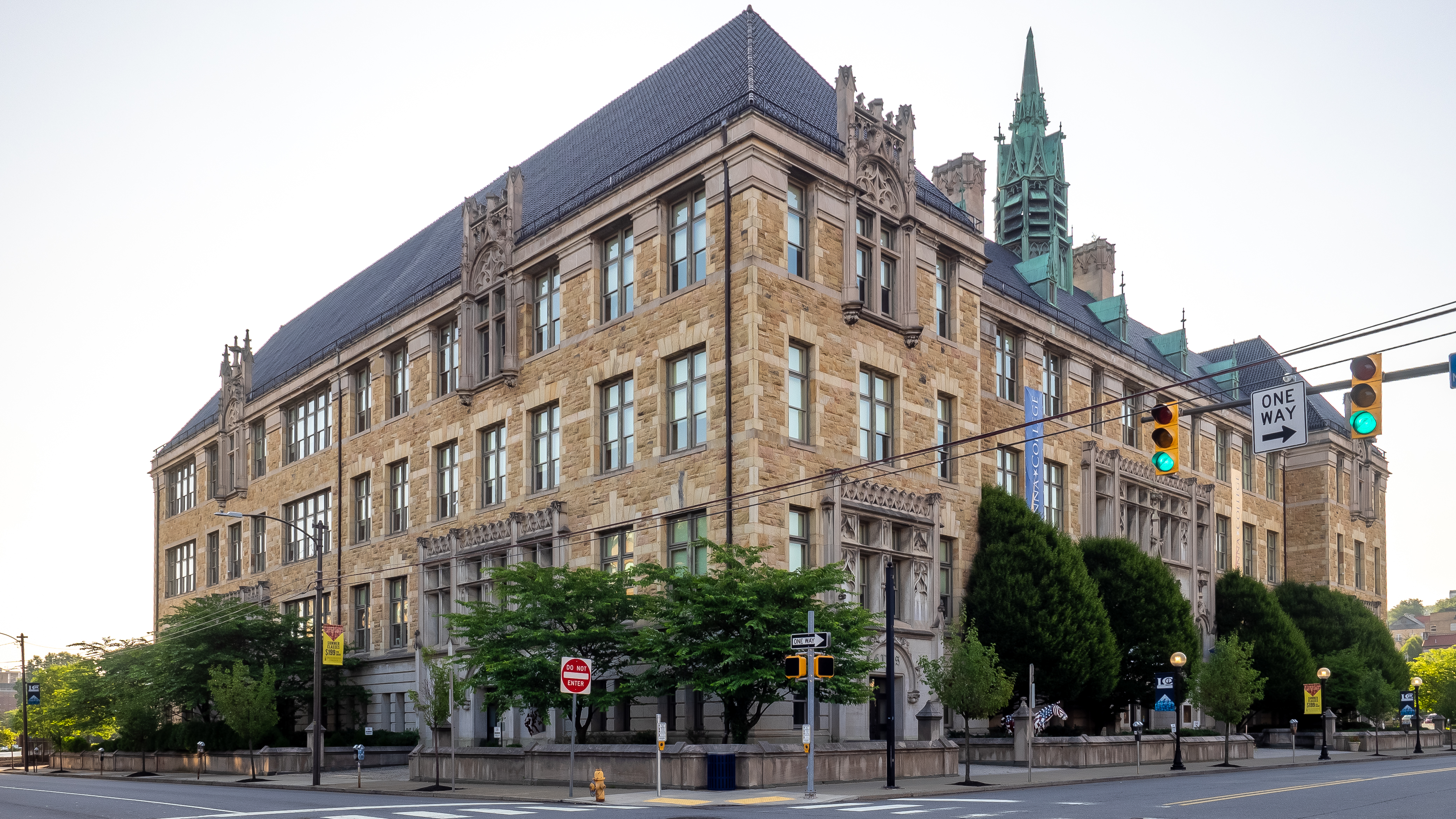
Lackawanna College Building in Scranton, 2019

The private four-year college has evolved with an open admissions policy and enrolls approximately 1,991 students.

While the college offers a variety of traditional academic programs, many of its popular majors are centered on vocations, such as law enforcement, culinary arts, and accounting. Lackawanna has invested in several Health Sciences programs including Cardiac Sonography, Diagnostic Medical Sonography, Vascular Technology, Physical Therapist Assistant, Occupational Therapy Assistant, and Surgical Technology. Lackawanna has established transfer agreements with a number of colleges in Pennsylvania and is part of the state's academic passport system.

Lackawanna College also operates police academies at its Scranton campus and Hazleton Center. The academy was originally certified by the Commonwealth of Pennsylvania through the Municipal Police Officers’ Education and Training Commission in Harrisburg, on April 21, 1977. Lackawanna is the first and continues to be the only private college in Northeastern Pennsylvania authorized to provide police education and training.

As of July 1, 2020, Lackawanna's president is Jill Murray, who succeeded former Lackawanna College president Colonel Mark Volk. The college is accredited by the Middle States Commission on Higher Education (MSCHE).

In August 2024, Lackawanna announced plans to merge with Peirce College in Philadelphia. The combined colleges will use the Lackawanna name.

== Notable alumni ==
- Mike Balogun, professional football player and boxer
- Jaquan Brisker, professional football player
- Ji'Ayir Brown, professional football player
- Jermaine Eluemunor, professional football player
- Mark Glowinski, professional football player
- Bryant McKinnie, professional football player
- Bob Mellow, President pro tempore of the Pennsylvania Senate
- Pheldarius Payne, professional football player
- Gale H. Stalker, U.S. Congressman from New York
- Lorenzo Taliaferro, professional football player
- Emmanuel Ubilla, professional basketball player
- Kevin White, professional football player
- Kyzir White, professional football player
