= Itawamba Indians =

Intercollegiate athletic programs of Itawamba Community College

- University: Itawamba Community College
- NJCAA: Region XXIII
- Conference: MACJC
- Athletic director: Chad Case
- Location: Fulton, Mississippi
- Varsity teams: 11
- Football stadium: Eaton Field
- Basketball arena: Davis Event Center
- Baseball stadium: Roy Cresap Field
- Nickname: Indians
- Colors: Navy and cardinal
- Website: www.letsgoicc.com

The Itawamba Community College Indians are 11 teams representing Itawamba Community College in intercollegiate athletics, including men and women's basketball, soccer, and tennis. Men's sports include baseball, football, and golf. Women's sports include softball and volleyball. The Indians compete in the NJCAA Region 23 and are members of the Mississippi Association of Community Colleges Conference (MACCC).

== Teams ==
| Men's | Women's |
|---|---|
| Baseball | Basketball |
| Basketball | Soccer |
| Football | Softball |
| Golf | Tennis |
| Soccer | Volleyball |
| Tennis | — |

== Baseball ==
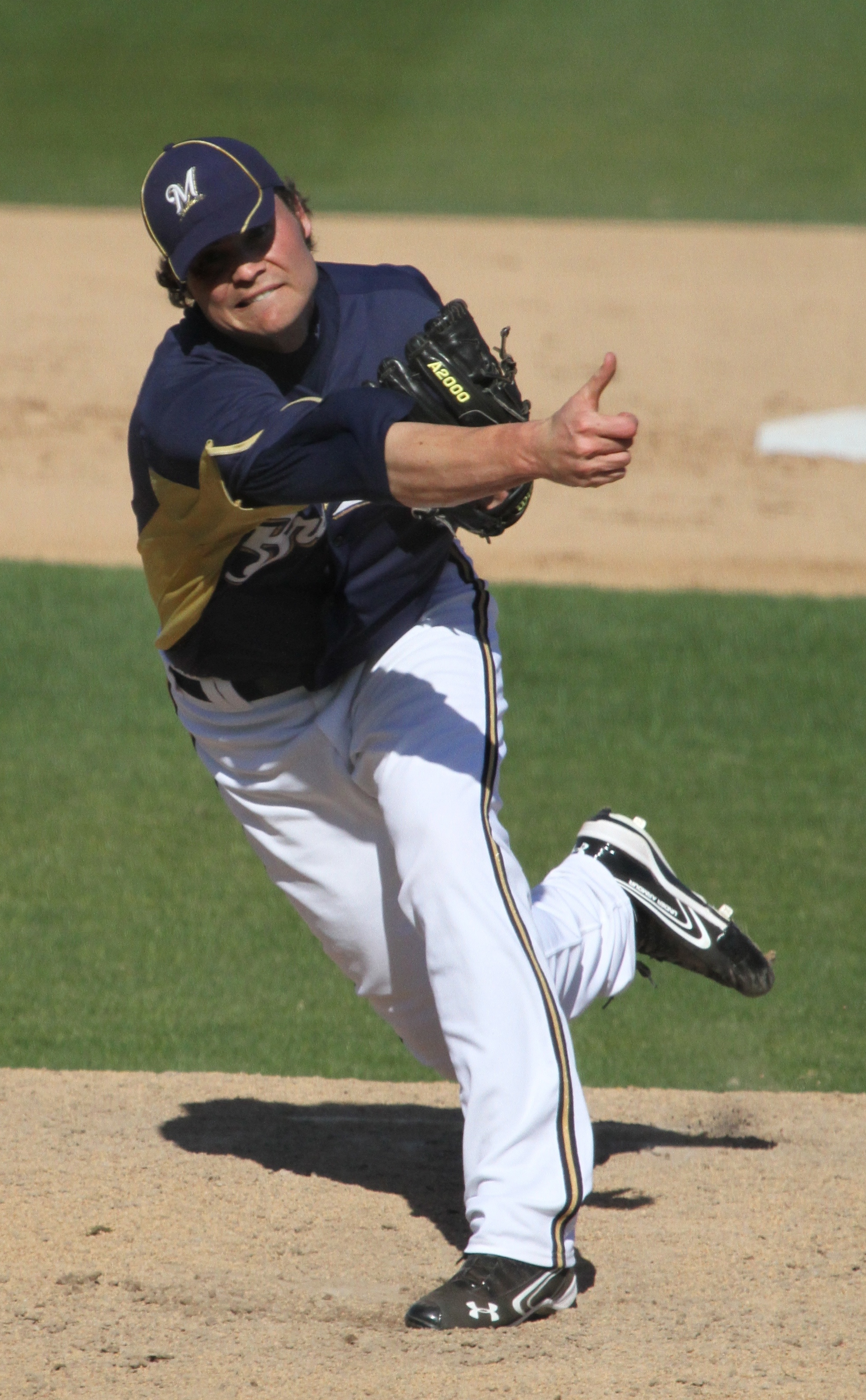
Tim Dillard pitched for the Milwaukee Brewers from 2008 to 2009 and 2011 to 2012.

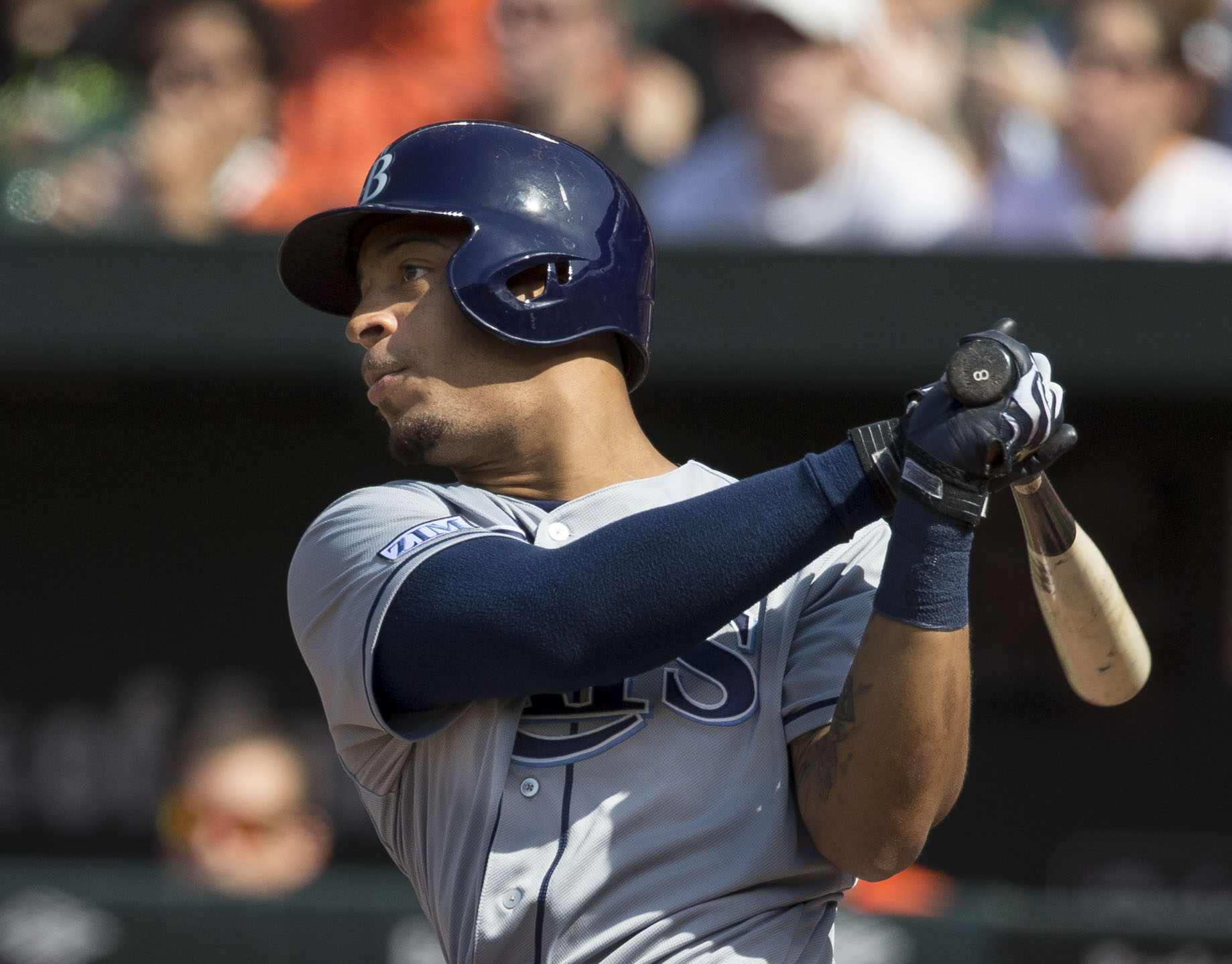
Desmond Jennings played for the Tampa Bay Rays from 2010 to 2016.

ICC has had 19 Major League Baseball draft selections since the draft began in 1965.

| Year | Player | Round | Team |
|---|---|---|---|
| 1974 | Mark Clemons | 12 | Indians |
| 1986 | Jack Moore | 8 | Astros |
| 1994 | Dustin Wright | 43 | White Sox |
| 1995 | Brian Bullock | 31 | White Sox |
| 1997 | Gary Peete | 61 | Blue Jays |
| 2000 | David Lindsay | 29 | Yankees |
| 2000 | Jonathan Van Every | 29 | Indians |
| 2000 | Eric Reynolds | 9 | Yankees |
| 2002 | Jeremy King | 34 | Angels |
| 2002 | Tim Dillard | 34 | Brewers |
| 2004 | Gary McKissick | 40 | Rockies |
| 2005 | Andrew Rice | 48 | Yankees |
| 2005 | Jared Wesson | 29 | Marlins |
| 2006 | Desmond Jennings | 10 | Devil Rays |
| 2007 | Charley Williams | 19 | Marlins |
| 2008 | Chris Hilliard | 38 | Mets |
| 2016 | Delvin Zinn | 23 | Cubs |
| 2017 | Tyreque Reed | 8 | Rangers |
| 2019 | Jackson Lancaster | 38 | Mariners |
