= East Mississippi Community College =

Public college in Scooba, Mississippi, US

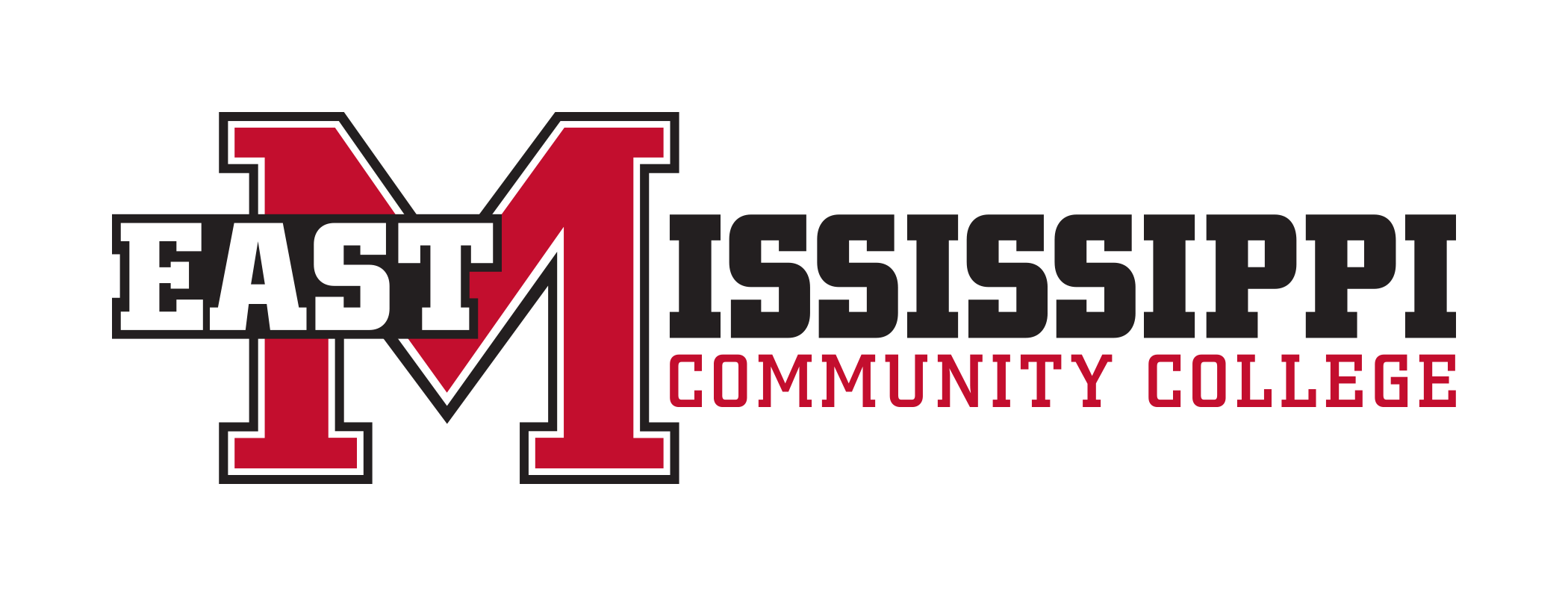
- Type: Public community college
- Established: 1927
- President: Scott Alsobrooks
- Location: Scooba, Mississippi, U.S.
- Colors: Red, black, white
- Nickname: Lions
- Sporting affiliations: NJCAA, MACCC
- Website: www.eastms.edu

East Mississippi Community College (EMCC), formerly East Mississippi Junior College, is a public community college in Scooba, Mississippi. EMCC serves and is supported by Clay, Kemper, Lauderdale, Lowndes, Noxubee and Oktibbeha counties in east central Mississippi. The college has two principal campuses in Scooba and Mayhew, Mississippi and offers courses at five other locations. One of fifteen community colleges in Mississippi, EMCC is accredited by the Southern Association of Colleges and Schools Commission on Colleges (SACSCOC) to award the Associate of Applied Science degree and the Associate of Arts degree.

EMCC is the home of the 2011, 2013, 2014, 2017, and 2018 NJCAA National Champions in American football.

== History ==
East Mississippi Community College was organized in 1927 following its beginnings as Kemper County Agricultural High School in Scooba. While the Scooba location has always been the primary campus, the Golden Triangle campus has been growing at an increasing rate since the 1990s. Founded as the Golden Triangle Vo-Tech Center in 1968, it serves the Golden Triangle region of Mississippi and is the primary location for workforce training and career-technical programs.

Historical highlights:

- 1922: The Mississippi Legislature passed enabling legislation authorizing agricultural high schools to add the "13th and 14th grades."
- 1927: Kemper County Agricultural High School became the sixth agricultural high school to add the 13th grade, marking the beginnings of the present-day college. Twenty students were enrolled that first year.
- 1929: John C. Stennis, then a state representative in the Mississippi Legislature, guided a bill that enabled Kemper County Agricultural High School to borrow $50,000 for the repair of buildings.
- 1932: Noxubee County joined in the support of Kemper-Noxubee Junior College and enrollment increased to 155 students. The 1933 catalogue included this statement: "To assist our students in paying matriculation fees and buying books, we will purchase, as far as we can use them, corn, peas, potatoes, molasses, pork, beef, butter, eggs and vegetables." This established the college's long-term policy of helping students overcome economic barriers to education.
- 1939: Lauderdale County joined in providing support, and the college was renamed East Mississippi Junior College.
- 1963: Lowndes County joined the EMJC district.
- 1966: Clay County joined the EMJC district.
- 1967: Oktibbeha County joined the EMJC district.
- 1968: East Mississippi Junior College's board of trustees voted to establish a vocational-technical center in Mayhew – the beginnings of the present-day Golden Triangle campus.
- 1972: EMJC began offering classes to military personnel and civilians at Columbus Air Force Base.
- Mid-1980s: EMJC began offering classes in Macon. The first teaching site was at the Noxubee County Vocational Center; present-day classes are taught at various locations in Macon.
- 1989: EMJC began offering classes at Naval Air Station Meridian.
- 1989: East Mississippi Junior College was renamed East Mississippi Community College.
- 1993: East Mississippi Community College established a Workforce Development program. The Workforce Development staff now works with more than 70 industrial and business partners, and the Center for Manufacturing Technology Excellence is considered a model program throughout the state.
- August 2007: East Mississippi Community College opened the West Point-Clay County Center in partnership with elected officials from Clay County and West Point. The first West Point programs were housed in three buildings donated by the Tennessee Valley Authority.
- October 2008: The State College Board of the Institutions of Higher Learning approved an associate degree Nursing Program at EMCC's Golden Triangle campus.
- Fall 2008 to Spring 2009: EMCC's tuition guarantee program got off the ground in Clay County in October 2008, with help from the CREATE Foundation, the Clay County Board of Supervisors and local fund-raisers. In January 2009, with the help of an anonymous corporate donor, the tuition guarantee program expanded to include students from Lowndes County. EMCC's tuition guarantee program went district-wide in April 2009 and is now available to students from Clay, Lowndes, Oktibbeha, Noxubee, Kemper and Lauderdale counties.
- October 2012: EMCC purchased the land and buildings of the former Columbus Country Club in U.S. Bankruptcy Court. After renovations, the facility re-opened the next year as Lion Hills Center, an extension campus of EMCC.

== Campuses ==
=== Scooba campus ===
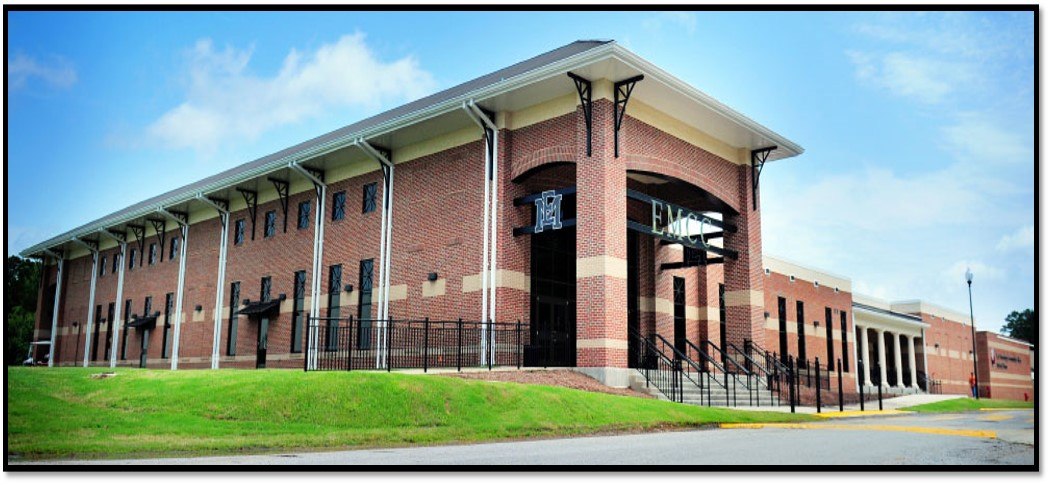
EMCC Scooba Campus Student Union

East Mississippi Community College's original campus is located in the Kemper County town of Scooba. It was founded in 1927 following its beginnings 15 years earlier as Kemper County Agricultural High School. The town is adjacent to the Kansas City Southern Railroad, U.S. Route 45, and Mississippi Highway 16, 35 miles north of Meridian and 50 miles south of Columbus. The college owns 287 acres of land, 25 of which make up the campus. The central administrative office for all of EMCC's locations is in the Thomas L. Davis Jr. Administration Building.

Other buildings include the F.R. Young Student Union (includes cafeteria and bookstore), Wallace Hall (business and financial aid offices), Wellness and Fitness Center, Physical Plant Complex, Chapel in the Pines, Orr Center for Christian Activity, Scooba Campus Police Department and EMCC president's residence.

Athletic facilities include Athletic Instruction and Training Building/Lions Field House, Sullivan-Windham Field (5,000-seat, artificial turf football stadium), Keyes Currie Coliseum (900-seat basketball arena), Gerald Poole Baseball Field, Lady Lions Softball Field and rodeo training arena.

==== Residence halls ====
The college maintains six residence halls and thirty cottages on the Scooba Campus which house nearly 700 students. Student residences are air-conditioned and equipped with furniture, cable TV outlets, Wi-Fi, security and laundry facilities.

Gilbert-Anderson Hall, the main residence hall for women, has living accommodations for 170 students. The Women's Honor Residence Hall can house 46 students; assignment to this residence hall requires students to demonstrate, and maintain, high grade point averages.

Residence halls for men include Lauderdale Hall (78 students), Noxubee Hall (84 students) and Sullivan Hall (60 students). The Men's Honor Residence can house 46 students; assignment to this residence hall requires students to demonstrate, and maintain, high grade point averages.

The campus also includes three athletic villages made up of 30 Katrina-style cottages, each housing four or five students, for a combined capacity of 104.

New dorm: Due to increasing demand, a new residence hall for the Scooba campus is currently in the planning stages.

=== Golden Triangle campus ===
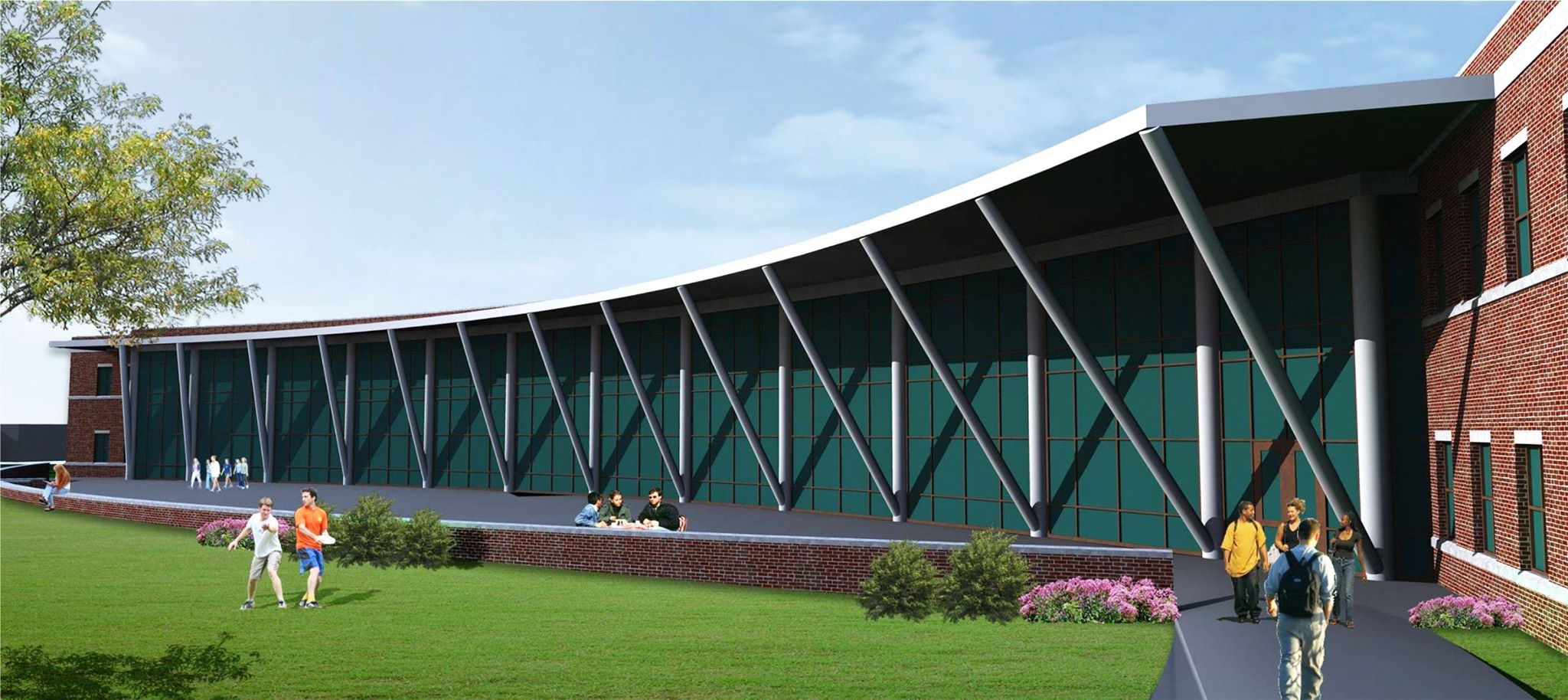
EMCC Golden Triangle Student Union

The Golden Triangle campus was opened in 1968. It is located in Mayhew, an unincorporated area in Lowndes County. on 83.46 acres adjacent to the frontage road of Highway 182 and the Illinois Central Gulf Railroad and 1 mile east of the intersection of U.S. Route 45 Alternate and U.S. Route 82. The campus is 10 miles east of Starkville, 10 miles south of West Point, and 12 miles west of Columbus. The Golden Triangle campus of multiple building with more than 200,000 square feet.

Thomas Douglas Building: Originally built as a vocational education center, the building has been expanded over time into a large complex, which houses classrooms for both academic and technical instruction. In addition, the Counseling Center, classrooms and laboratories for career-technical programs, computer applications, IT, Administrative Computing, ABE-GED and developmental education are located in this facility. Also located in the Douglas Building is the Aaron Langston Student Center, which houses the bookstore, lounge area and 155 Grill.

Thomas Douglas Annex: This facility includes classrooms, labs, and office space for three career-technical programs, Automotive Technology, Welding and Fabrication and Industrial Maintenance.

Center for Manufacturing Technology Excellence: Located on the west side of the campus, the CMTE is the home of EMCC's Manufacturing Technology & Engineering Division, which provides workforce training for Golden Triangle area industries. It includes 7,800 square feet of high bay manufacturing space, a 4,400-square-foot multi-purpose commons area, classrooms, a 70-seat elevated seminar room, and an administration area which includes office space, workrooms and a conference room.

Math and Science Building: This facility provides classrooms and additional office space for faculty, recruiting staff, and the dean of students. It contains three science laboratories, which are used concurrently as chemistry, physics and biology classrooms. A 70-seat elevated seminar classroom for larger group instruction is supported by laptop connections.

Library: With more than 8,000 square feet, the library has two study rooms, a computer lab with 17 computers, and a multi-media center.

Administration and Student Services Building: This facility houses administrative offices, the business office, financial aid offices, the registrar's office and other student services offices.

Humanities and Fine Arts Building: Opened in 2008, this facility includes classrooms and offices for faculty, as well as the campus art studio. A central administrative suite contains the offices of the Vice President for Instruction and the Associate Deans of Instruction.

Student Union: A new 76,000-square-foot Student Union is scheduled to open during fall 2016. The building will house a full-service cafeteria with a large open dining room and a much larger bookstore, with lounge areas and additional retail space for online e-books, laptop computers and tablets. Also included are a special events dining room, 12 multi-purpose classrooms, large elevated lecture hall, computer lab with 100 work stations, office suites, art gallery, convenience store and Starbucks coffee shop.

=== Columbus Air Force Base extension ===
East Mississippi Community College opened an extension campus at Columbus Air Force Base in 1972, just four years after the Golden Triangle campus in Mayhew. CAFB is located 11 miles north of Columbus. The extension campus offers daytime, evening and online classes. Military students can complete their associate degrees with EMCC, or transfer credits to the Community College of the Air Force and pick up where they left off at their next duty station. Generally, about a third of CAFB Extension's students are active-duty military or military dependents. The other two-thirds are civilians from the Lowndes County area. This campus is closed.

=== Naval Air Station Meridian extension ===
Since 1989, East Mississippi Community College has offered classes year-round at its Naval Air Station Meridian Extension, located 20 miles north of Meridian. Military students can complete their associate degrees with EMCC, or pick up where they left off at their next duty station through an agreement with the Servicemembers Opportunity Colleges and the American Council on Education. Students include active-duty military, military dependents and civilians from the Lauderdale County area. This campus is closed.

=== Lion Hills Center ===
In October 2012, East Mississippi Community College purchased the land and buildings of the former Columbus Country Club in Columbus, Miss., in U.S. Bankruptcy Court. After renovations, the facility re-opened the following year as Lion Hills Center, an extension campus of EMCC.

Education and training is the centerpiece of Lion Hills Center's service to the community. The facility is the home of EMCC's Hotel and Restaurant Management, Culinary Arts, and Golf and Recreational Turf Management programs. In addition to these college credit programs, Lion Hills hosts continuing education and community interest courses, educational and corporate seminars, and small conferences that serve local and regional interests.

EMCC has retained the facility's identity as a community meeting place. Lion Hills Center operates as a dining facility with professionally trained staff and opportunities for EMCC Hotel and Restaurant and Culinary Arts students to benefit from hands-on experience. Culinary camps are offered in the summer to area children. Lion Hills Center also hosts civic club meetings, banquets, receptions, holiday parties and family gatherings.

Lion Hills Center continues to operate the golf course, swimming pool and tennis courts. Community groups host fund-raising golf tournaments. Golf, swimming and tennis lessons are offered to area children. As with the restaurant operation, EMCC Golf and Recreational Turf Management students work with professional groundskeepers to put classroom lessons into practice.

=== West Point-Clay County Center ===
EMCC opened the West Point-Clay County Center in August 2007 after a plant closing in West Point resulted in the loss of 1,600 jobs and a double-digit unemployment rate in Clay County. The West Point facility is the result of a collaborative effort among the city of West Point, Clay County and EMCC. It began with the signing of an interlocal agreement providing for the renovation of three buildings donated by the Tennessee Valley Authority.

The West Point-Clay County Center is the home of EMCC's Commercial Truck Driving and Residential Carpentry programs. Through EMCC's Manufacturing Technology & Engineering Division, students can also take Adult Basic Education and GED preparation classes. Workforce classes in welding are offered in the evening. In addition, Yokohama Tire Manufacturing Mississippi, located in West Point, requires all potential employees to complete workforce classes at EMCC before applying for jobs. These classes, as well as classes and training for current Yokohama employees, are conducted at the West Point-Clay County Center.

=== Macon Extension ===
In the mid-1980s, East Mississippi Community College established extension offerings in Macon, which is located in Noxubee County. Core classes are taught at various locations, including Noxubee County High School, Noxubee County Public Library, Noxubee County Civic Center and Hensleigh Training Center.

== Academics ==
EMCC offers a broad range of academic/university parallel, career-technical, and workforce training options. These include "stackable" education credentials. At EMCC, one student could progress seamlessly though these steps, earning in order: GED, industry certificate through a non-credit workforce class, vocational certificate through a for-credit career-technical program, and an associate degree in a career-technical program. Some EMCC graduates enter the workforce at different points along this path; others transfer to four-year colleges and universities.

The college has Honors programs and Phi Theta Kappa chapters at its Scooba and Golden Triangle campuses.

=== Career-technical programs ===
EMCC offers career-technical programs at its Scooba and Golden Triangle campuses, as well as Lions Hills Center and the West Point-Clay County Center. In many programs, students have the option of earning a vocational certificate through a short-term curriculum plan or an Associate of Applied Science degree over the course of two years of study. Career-technical programs related to industry and manufacturing are overseen by EMCC's Manufacturing Technology and Engineering (MTE) Division.

=== Workforce training ===
EMCC's Manufacturing Technology & Engineering Division offers workforce training designed around the needs of the Golden Triangle area's high-tech industries. Students learn the skills needed by potential employers, earn certificates and degrees recognized by industry and are prepared to compete successfully for jobs. Industry leaders have the unique opportunity to partner with EMCC and build training models to ensure that new hires will start their jobs with a skill set suited to their duties.

EMCC established the Workforce Development program in 1993. The staff now works with more than 70 industrial and business partners and is working to increase the number of workforce offerings throughout EMCC's six-county district. Workforce Development and the new Manufacturing Technology & Engineering Division are headquartered at the Golden Triangle campus in the Center for Manufacturing Technology Excellence (CMTE).

In 2018, EMCC is scheduled to open a large-scale workforce training center on land adjoining the Golden Triangle Regional Global Industrial Aerospace Park. Known as the "Communiversity" in the Golden Triangle area, it will replace the current CMTE. The 140,000-square-foot facility will accommodate EMCC Manufacturing Technology & Engineering Division credit and non-credit courses related to training workers for careers in advanced manufacturing. It is intended to enhance a growing manufacturing sector in East Mississippi by supporting workforce development for existing and prospective industries.

==== Credit classes ====
Workforce/Manufacturing Technology & Engineering oversees nine career-technical programs offering vocational certificate and/or associate degree options: Automation & Control, Automotive Technology, Drafting and Design, Electrical Technology, Electro-Mechanical Technology/Mechatronics, Electronics Technology, Industrial Maintenance, Precision Manufacturing & Machining, and Welding & Fabrication Technology.

==== Non-credit classes ====
Non-credit workforce training options include customized programs for individual industries. EMCC also offers non-credit workforce classes in computer applications, leadership, manufacturing skills, medical technology and health care, construction, electrical work, machining, HVAC, AutoCAD and welding. The MTE Division also offers employability skills classes for young adults and a summer camp for students in grades 7–12.

==== ABE-GED ====
The Manufacturing Technology and Engineering Division oversees the EMCC Launch Pad, which offers Adult Basic Education and GED preparation classes.

== Athletics ==
EMCC offers men's athletics programs in baseball, basketball, cheerleading, football, golf and rodeo. Women's teams are fielded in basketball, cheerleading, rodeo, and softball.

The Lions of East Mississippi Community College are affiliated with the National Junior College Athletic Association (NJCAA) and the Mississippi Association of Community and Junior Colleges (MACJC). EMCC competes at the NJCAA Division I level in football and basketball while participating at the Division II level in baseball, softball and men's golf. The college's athletic teams in football and basketball currently compete within the MACJC's North Division.

Over the past decade (beginning with 2008–09 season), East Mississippi Community College's athletic teams have combined for four NJCAA national championships, 10 NJCAA national postseason appearances, nine NJCAA Region 23 championships, four MACJC state championships, and 16 MACJC North Division regular-season titles. Individually since 2008–09, EMCC has had a composite total of 30 NJCAA All-Americans in football, men's basketball, women's basketball and men's golf combined. In addition, Marcus Theriot claimed the national collegiate championships (National Intercollegiate Rodeo Association) in men's All-Around and tie-down roping at the 2016 College National Finals Rodeo.

The 2015 and 2016 football seasons were documented in the first and second seasons of the Netflix series Last Chance U.

=== Football ===
- Five-time NJCAA National Champions (2011, 2013, 2014, 2017, 2018)
- Seven-time MACJC State/NJCAA Region 23 Champions (2009, 2011, 2013, 2014, 2016, 2017, 2018)
- Nine-time MACJC North Division Champions (2009, 2011–2018)

=== Men's basketball ===
- Five-time NJCAA National Tournament participants (2010–13, 2016)
- Four-time NJCAA Region 23 Tournament champions (2010–13)
- Five-time MACJC North Division champions (2010–13, 2019)
- 2019 MACJC State champions

=== Women's basketball ===
- 2009 NJCAA National Tournament participant
- 2009 NJCAA Region 23 Tournament champion
- Three-time MACJC North Division champions (2009, 2011, 2014)

=== Baseball ===
- 2015 NJCAA Region 23 Tournament participant
- 2014 MACJC North Division champion
- Three-time MACJC state playoff participants (2011, 2014, 2015)

=== Softball ===
- Two-time NJCAA Academic Softball Team of the Year (2013, 2014)
- 2011 MACJC North Division champion
- Seven-time MACJC state playoff participants (2009–14, 2016)

=== Men's golf ===
- Four-time MACJC State Championship runners-up (2011–13, 2015)
- Two-time NJCAA Region 23 Championship runners-up (2009, 2014)

=== Rodeo ===
- Fifth-place men's team national finish in 2016 College National Finals Rodeo.
- Marcus Theriot won 2016 All-Around and tie-down roping national championships at 2016 CNFR.
- Represented at CNFR every year since program's inception in 2010.

== Alumni ==
- Dakota Allen — professional football player
- Larry Anderson — college basketball coach
- Denico Autry — professional football player
- LeGarrette Blount — professional football player
- Orlando Bobo — professional football player
- Eddie Briggs — former Lieutenant Governor of Mississippi
- Milford Brown — professional football player
- Sen. Terry Brown — former president pro tempore of the Mississippi State Senate
- D. J. Jones — professional football player
- Kortney Clemons — Paralympic athlete who played football at EMCC
- Justin Cox — professional football player
- George Cummings — guitarist and songwriter; founder of Dr. Hook & the Medicine Show, well known for many hits, among them "The Cover of Rolling Stone"
- Quinton Dial — professional football player
- John Franklin III — professional football player
- Willie Earl Gillespie — professional football player
- Tom Goode — professional football player
- Chad Kelly — professional football player
- Jack Manley — professional football player
- Devonta Pollard — professional basketball player
- C. J. Reavis — professional football player
- Jarran Reed — professional football player
- Chauncey Rivers — professional football player
- Donald C. Simmons, Jr. — documentary filmmaker, author, and social entrepreneur
- Antowain Smith — professional football player
- Rep. Jeff Smith — politician in the Mississippi State Legislature
- Za'Darius Smith — professional football player
- Bob "Bull" "Cyclone" Sullivan — college football coach
- Bo Wallace — college football coach
