= Coahoma Community College =

Community college in Coahoma County, Mississippi, U.S.

- Former names: Coahoma County Agricultural High School; Coahoma Junior College and Agricultural High School
- Type: Public historically black community college
- Established: 1949; 77 years ago
- Academic affiliations: Space-grant
- President: Valmadge Towner
- Students: 1,612 (2020)
- Location: Coahoma County, Mississippi, United States; 34°15′21″N 90°34′11″W
- Campus: Rural, 99 acres (400,000 m^{2})
- Colors: Maroon and white
- Nickname: Tigers
- Sporting affiliations: NJCAA, MACCC
- Website: www.coahomacc.edu

Coahoma Community College (CCC) is a public historically black community college in unincorporated Coahoma County, Mississippi. The college was founded in 1949 and is accredited by the Southern Association of Colleges and Schools Commission on Colleges. It offers associate degree and certificate programs in more than 70 areas of focus.

The 99-acre (400,000 m^{2}) campus lies in an agrarian setting along Clarksdale-Friars Point Road near the Mississippi River and serves Coahoma, Bolivar, Quitman, Tallahatchie, and Tunica counties.

CCC's athletic teams, the Tigers, compete in the Mississippi Association of Community Colleges Conference (MACCC) of the National Junior College Athletic Association (NJCAA).

== History ==
Coahoma Community College was founded in Coahoma County in 1949 as an extension of Coahoma Agricultural High School (1924), Mississippi's first agricultural high school for black students. Upon the establishment of the college, the high school was renamed Coahoma Junior College and Agricultural High School. The college initially offered courses to black students under the separate but equal doctrine. It was the first community college in Mississippi for black students.

Before becoming affiliated with Mississippi's public junior colleges system in its second year of operation, CCC was fully-funded by Coahoma County.

In 1989, the Board of Trustees and State Board for Community and Junior Colleges approved renaming the junior college to Coahoma Community College.

In 1995, the Mississippi Legislature granted the college its own district consisting of Bolivar, Coahoma, Quitman, Tallahatchie, and Tunica Counties.

=== Superintendents and presidents ===
Prior to 1945, the college was led by a superintendent. Superintendents and presidents of the college have included:

- M. L. Strange, 1924–1925
- J. M. Mosley, 1924–1929
- J. W. Addison, 1929–1937
- J. B. Wright, 1937–1945
- B. F. McLaurin, 1945–1966
- J. E. Miller, 1966–1979
- McKinley C. Martin, 1980–1992
- Vivian M. Presley, 1992–2013
- Valmadge Towner, 2013–present

== Administration and organization ==
CCC operates under four divisions: Academic, Career & Technical Education, Health Sciences and Workforce Development.

A typical academic year contains two 15-week terms during the fall (August–December) and spring (January–May). Within the full terms are two accelerated eight-week terms each fall and spring, as well as a two-week winter session (December–January).The full summer term is eight weeks long (May–July) and contains two accelerated four-week terms. An academic year begins on the first day of the fall term and ends on the last day of the summer term.

CCC's endowment had a market value of approximately $2.77 million in the fiscal year that ended in 2019.

== Academics ==
CCC has an open admissions policy.

The college offers dual enrollment programs to local high school students. In addition to its associate and certificate degree programs, CCC offers adult education courses as well as non-credit continuing education and workforce development courses.

CCC has transfer agreements with every public four-year institution in Mississippi. The agreements allow students to automatically transfer after completing an associate degree at CCC.

CCC is a TRIO program participant through its Educational Talent Search program, which is a government-funded program that supports low-income and first-generation college students in achieving their postsecondary, career and economic goals. The program offers educational support, high school and college entry guidance and academic advising to local students in grades 7 through 12.

== Student life ==
=== Student body ===
As of fall 2020, CCC's student body consisted of 1,612 students. There were 78 percent full time and 22 percent part time students.

Demographics of student body in fall 2020
	Full and Part Time Students	U.S. Census (Note: People who identify as Hispanic/Latino are included in applicable race categories.)
International	1%	N/A
Multiracial American	0%	2.8%
Black/African American	92%	13.4%
American Indian and Alaska Native	0%	1.3%
Asian	0%	5.9%
Non-Hispanic White American	6%	60.1%
Hispanic/Latino American	1%	18.5%
Native Hawaiian and Other Pacific Islander	0%	0.2%
Other/Unknown	0%	N/A

=== Organizations ===
More than 30 student clubs and organizations operate at CCC, including student government, special interest and service organizations.

CCC holds '"Mr. Coahoma Community College" and "Miss Coahoma Community College", annual beauty pageants that honor a select group of current, high-achieving students within the college's student government association.

=== Athletics ===
The CCC athletic association chairs six varsity athletic programs. The teams are collectively known as the Tigers. They belong to the Mississippi Association of Community Colleges Conference and Region 23 of the National Junior College Athletic Association (NJCAA). Men's sports include basketball, baseball and football. Women's sports include basketball and softball. CCC also chairs a co-ed track & field team. Although it is not affiliated with the NJCAA, CCC also chairs a co-ed cheerleading squad.

== Notable alumni ==
- Chris Claybrooks — professional football player
- Earnie Killum — former professional basketball player
- Orlando Paden — member of the Mississippi House of Representatives
- Timothy Pollard — former NCAA Division I basketball player
- Davion Taylor — professional football player
