= Mississippi Association of Community Colleges Conference =

Junior college athletic conference

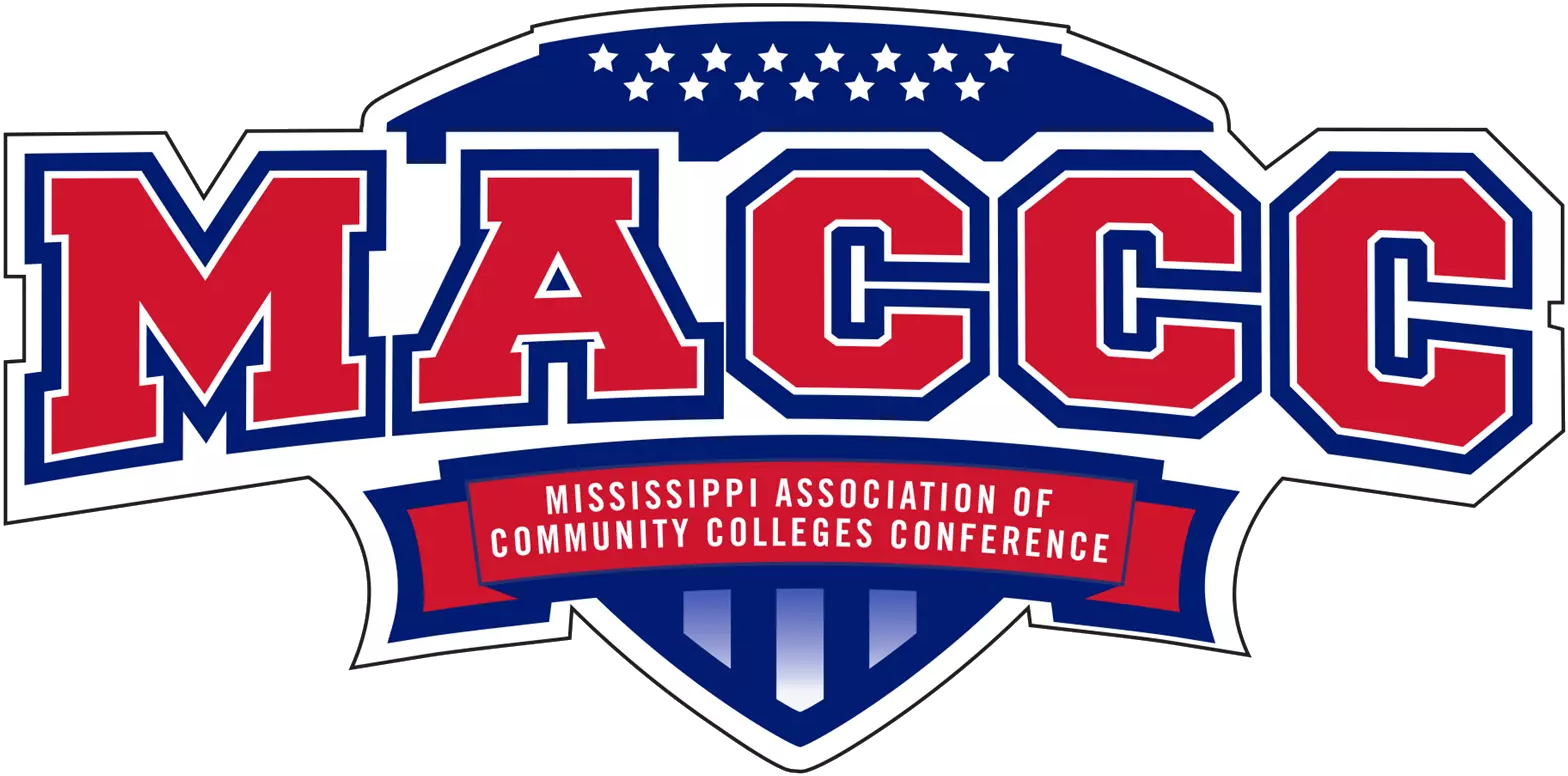
- Association: NJCAA
- Sports fielded: 15 (8 men's, 7 women's)
- No. of teams: 15
- Region: Mississippi – Region 23
- Website: macccathletics.com

The Mississippi Association of Community Colleges Conference (MACCC), formerly known as the Mississippi Association of Community and Junior Colleges (MACJC) is one of the two junior college athletic conferences that make up NJCAA Region 23 of the National Junior College Athletic Association (NJCAA) along with the Louisiana Community Colleges Athletic Conference (LCCAC). Its football league began play in 1927.

The East Mississippi Community College football team was featured on the first and second seasons of the television documentary Last Chance U and consequently multiple games of the conference were featured on the documentary.

== Member schools ==
=== Current members ===
The MACCC currently has 15 full members, all are public schools:

Institution	Location (Note: All locations are within the State of Mississippi.)	Founded	Affiliation	Enrollment	Nickname	Joined	Division
Coahoma Community College	Clarksdale	1949	Public (Note: Part of the Mississippi Community College Board.)	1,612	Tigers	?	North
Copiah–Lincoln Community College	Wesson	1928	Public	3,929	Wolf Pack	?	South
East Central Community College	Decatur	1928	Public	3,049	Warriors	?	South
East Mississippi Community College	Scooba	1927	Public	5,433	Lions	?	North
Hinds Community College	Raymond (Note: Hinds' main gymnasium is at its Utica campus.)	1917	Public	12,811	Eagles	?	South
Holmes Community College	Goodman	1911	Public	5,409	Bulldogs	?	North
Itawamba Community College	Fulton	1948	Public	5,654	Indians	?	North
Jones College (Note: Also known as Jones County Junior College.)	Ellisville	1911	Public	4,778	Bobcats	?	South
Meridian Community College (Note: Non-football full member.)	Meridian	1937	Public	3,435	Eagles	2002	South
Mississippi Delta Community College	Moorhead	1927	Public	3,491	Trojans	?	North
Mississippi Gulf Coast Community College	Perkinston	1911	Public	8,677	Bulldogs	?	South
Northeast Mississippi Community College	Booneville	1948	Public	3,400	Tigers	?	North
Northwest Mississippi Community College	Senatobia	1927	Public	6,607	Rangers	?	North
Pearl River Community College	Poplarville	1909	Public	5,731	Wildcats	?	South
Southwest Mississippi Community College	Summit	1908	Public	2,128	Bears	?	South

=== Former members ===
The MACCC had one former full member, which was also a private school:

Institution	Location (Note: All locations are within the State of Mississippi.)	Founded	Affiliation	Enrollment	Nickname	Joined	Left	Current conference
Clarke College	Newton	1908	Baptist	N/A	?	?	?	N/A (Note: Institution was absorbed into Mississippi College in 1991.)

== Conference championships ==
=== Football ===
In order of total titles won.

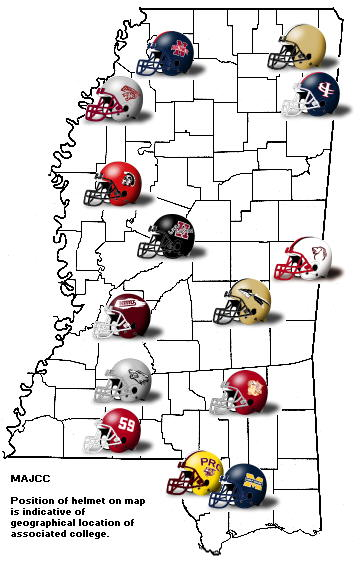
Map showing location of MACCC schools with football helmets indicating location

- Pearl River (19 titles, 15 outright): 2006, 2005, 2004*, 2003, 1976, 1970, 1969, 1963, 1961, 1960+, 1959, 1956, 1953+, 1952+, 1949, 1928+, 1927, 1926, 1925
- Mississippi Gulf Coast (aka Perkinston) (16 titles, 13 outright): 2019*, 2010, 2008, 2007+* (co-nat'l championship with Butler), 1986, 1984*, 1982+, 1980, 1974, 1971*, 1967, 1966, 1948, 1942, 1936, 1927+
- Jones County (13 titles, 12 outright): 2001, 1998, 1983, 1979, 1978, 1968, 1964, 1955, 1951, 1947, 1946+, 1941, 1940
- Hinds (13 titles, 9 outright): 2000, 1997, 1996, 1995, 1994, 1988, 1957, 1954, 1953+, 1952+, 1946+, 1945+, 1944*
- Northwest Mississippi (13 titles, 11 outright): 2025, 2024, 2021, 2020, 2015*, 1999, 1992*, 1991, 1989, 1987, 1982+, 1965, 1960+
- Copiah-Lincoln (10 titles, 10 outright): 2012, 1985, 1938, 1937, 1934, 1933, 1932, 1931, 1930, 1929
- East Mississippi (8 titles, 8 outright): 2023, 2022, 2018, 2017, 2016, 2014*, 2013*, 2011*, 2009
- Holmes (5 titles, 4 outright): 2002, 1981, 1950, 1945+, 1935
- Mississippi Delta (aka Sunflower) (5 titles, 4 outright): 1993*, 1973, 1972, 1962, 1928+
- Itawamba (3 titles, 3 outright): 1990, 1977, 1975
- East Central (2 title, 1 outright): 2016, 1939
- Southwest Mississippi (1 title, 1 outright): 1958
- Clarke (1 title, 0 outright): 1928+

. "+" denotes shared title.

== National champions ==
=== NJCAA National Football Champions ===
- 1971: Mississippi Gulf Coast
- 1982: Northwest Mississippi
- 1984: Mississippi Gulf Coast
- 1992: Northwest Mississippi
- 1993: Mississippi Delta
- 2004: Pearl River
- 2007: Mississippi Gulf Coast (co-champions with Butler (KS))
- 2011: East Mississippi
- 2013: East Mississippi
- 2014: East Mississippi
- 2015: Northwest Mississippi
- 2017: East Mississippi
- 2018: East Mississippi
- 2019: Mississippi Gulf Coast

== See also ==
- List of junior college football programs in the United States
