= Matt Grossell =

American politician

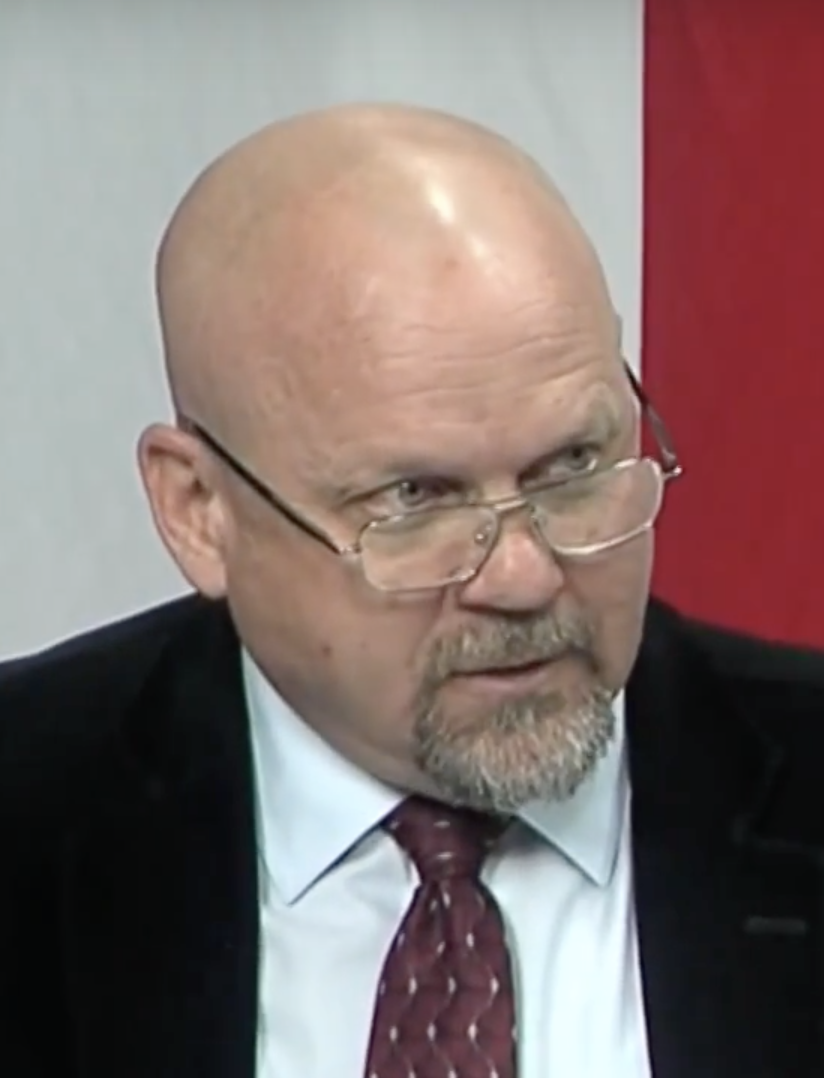

Member of the Minnesota House of Representatives from the 2A district
- In office January 3, 2017 – January 14, 2025
- Preceded by: Dave Hancock
- Succeeded by: Bidal Duran Jr.

Personal details
- Born: October 15, 1965 (age 61) Itasca County, Minnesota, U.S.
- Party: Republican
- Children: 3
- Education: Itasca Community College (AA); Hibbing Community College
- Occupation: Retired law enforcement; Legislator
- Website: Government website

Matthew "Matt" Grossell (/ˈɡrɒsəl/; born October 15, 1965) is an American politician who served in the Minnesota House of Representatives from 2017 to 2025. A member of the Republican Party of Minnesota, Grossell represented District 2A in northwestern Minnesota, which includes the city of Bemidji and parts of Beltrami, Clearwater, and Lake of the Woods Counties.

== Early life, education, and career ==
Grossell attended Itasca Community College, graduating with an Associate of Arts degree, and Hibbing Community College, graduating with a law enforcement certificate. He is a retired Clearwater County sheriff's deputy, and was shot on the job a month into his time as an officer.

== Minnesota House of Representatives ==
Grossell was elected to the Minnesota House of Representatives in 2016 and was reelected every two years until 2022. He first ran after two-term Republican incumbent Dave Hancock did not seek reelection.

Grossell served on the Capital Investment, Judiciary Finance and Civil Law and Public Safety Finance and Policy Committees.

In December 2023, Grossell announced he would not seek reelection after serving four terms in the Minnesota House.

=== Public safety and policing ===
Grossell authored legislation raising the penalty for attacking a police officer to a felony and prohibits local governments from disarming police. After the Minnesota Police and Peace Officer's Association testified in support of certain gun safety measures, Grossell said the organization had "allowed themselves to be politically motivated".

During a press conference on crime in Minneapolis, Grossell got into an argument with Mayor Jacob Frey, the two accused each other of lying about Minneapolis' policing policy. After the murder of George Floyd, Grossell drew controversy by posting the death was "not about race".

=== Other political positions ===
Grossell has supported Enbridge's plans to replace the Line 3 crude oil pipeline. He opposed legislation to extend drivers licences to all Minnesotans regardless of immigration status.

== Arrests ==
=== May 2019 arrest ===
In May 2019, Grossell was arrested for illegal trespassing by St. Paul police. Police found him drunk after becoming unruly at a hotel bar near the Capitol, and took him to the hospital for evaluation. Once there, Grossell was cleared by staff but refused to leave, became argumentative, and was arrested. He released an apology, saying "I apologize to my family, my constituents, my colleagues, and my friends. As a retired deputy sheriff, I will fully cooperate with any next steps".

Grossell was later additionally charged with disorderly conduct, after reports that he pushed a security guard several times, pulling him to the ground. According to police reports, when Grossell was released from jail, he entered St. Paul police headquarters and told front desk staff he was a state representative and former sheriff that "it will be hell to pay". After legal negotiations, Grossell agreed to perform 16 hours of community service and pay a $150 fee to have the charges dismissed.

Following the incident, Grossell was removed from both the House Public Safety and Judiciary committees by Speaker Melissa Hortman. Hortman stated she found Grossell's "implied threat" to law enforcement to be an abuse of office. Grossell's attorney and Republican minority leader Kurt Daudt criticized Hortman for the removal.

=== February 2023 arrest ===
In February 2023, Grossell was arrested and cited with three misdemeanors for driving under the influence of alcohol. He was stopped at 2:40 a.m. near his home for speeding, and his blood alcohol level was measured at .15%, which is almost twice the .08% legal limit.

Grossell was re-assigned to both the Public Safety and Judiciary committees after the 2022 election, and Speaker Horman said she was waiting on more information before deciding to take action on Grossell's committee assignments.

== Electoral history ==
2016 Minnesota State House - District 2A
| Party | Candidate | Votes | % |
|---|---|---|---|
| Republican | Matt Grossell | 12,387 | 63.94 |
| Democratic (DFL) | Jerry Loud | 6,925 | 35.74 |
| Write-in | | 62 | 0.32 |
| Total votes | | 19,374 | 100.0 |
| Republican hold | | | |

2018 Minnesota State House - District 2A
| Party | Candidate | Votes | % |
|---|---|---|---|
| Republican | Matt Grossell | 10,006 | 59.78 |
| Democratic (DFL) | Michael Northbird | 6,765 | 40.18 |
| Write-in | | 7 | 0.04 |
| Total votes | | 16,778 | 100.0 |
| Republican hold | | | |

2020 Minnesota State House - District 2A
| Party | Candidate | Votes | % |
|---|---|---|---|
| Republican | Matt Grossell | 14,009 | 62.43 |
| Democratic (DFL) | Jeremiah Liend | 8,395 | 37.41 |
| Write-in | | 35 | 0.16 |
| Total votes | | 22,439 | 100.0 |
| Republican hold | | | |

2022 Minnesota State House - District 2A
| Party | Candidate | Votes | % |
|---|---|---|---|
| Republican | Matt Grossell | 8,836 | 54.35 |
| Democratic (DFL) | Reed Olson | 7,405 | 45.55 |
| Write-in | | 16 | 0.10 |
| Total votes | | 16,257 | 100.0 |
| Republican hold | | | |

== Personal life ==
Grossell is single and has three children. He resides in Clearbrook, Minnesota.
