= Minnesota Duluth Bulldogs men's golf =

The Bulldogs men's golf team represented the University of Minnesota Duluth (UMD) in the sport of golf from 1947 to 1991. Overshadowed by the school's hockey, football and basketball programs, constrained by parsimonious budgets, disadvantaged by a short spring season, and without athletic scholarships, the UMD golf program was, nonetheless, one of the most successful of the University's intercollegiate athletic programs during its existence. Perennially a conference champion threat with rosters composed of predominately Duluth area athletes, the golf team was one of the first UMD athletic programs to qualify for national championship play and gave the school its first two All-American First Team honorees. During the 45 years of the program, the Bulldogs finished first or second in conference 29 times. Thirteen teams qualified for the NAIA National Championship Tournament and seven were selected to play for the NCAA Division II title. The golf program had the distinction of representing the highest showing for a UMD team of any sport at a national event for 31 years and the highest individual finish for 25 years. Despite its achievements, the UMD golf program was eliminated for the 1991–92 school year, a casualty of athletic department budget cuts.

== Early years – golf program beginnings ==
The UMD golf program began in the spring of 1947 with Ward Wells as coach (some newspaper articles credit athletic director Lloyd Peterson as head coach). (Note: In 1946, five Duluth State athletes participated in the State Teachers College Conference of Minnesota track, tennis and golf meet including George Stielow who represented the school in the golf competition.) At the time, the school was known as the Duluth State Teacher's College (Duluth State) and was affiliated with the State Teachers College Conference of Minnesota (TCC). With the conclusion of World War II and the return of college-aged men from the armed services, Duluth State administrators met in June 1946 to propose the creation of an expanded sports program for the school (the war-suspended football and basketball programs resumed play for the 1945-1946 school year). To this end, they agreed to reestablish the shuttered men's ice hockey program and commence other athletic activities such as track, skiing, golf and boxing for the 1946-47 school year.

The inaugural Bulldogs golf team played only a brief schedule of meets in May 1947. In its first meet as a golf program, Duluth State lost to a squad from the Duluth Junior College at Lester Park Golf Course with only Walter Silesky winning his match. However, at the Bemidji Invitational track and field meet, the Bulldogs scored top honors by defeating Bemidji State Teachers College and Moorhead State Teachers College with James Cran carding a 79 to tie for medalist. These meets were conducted in preparation for the TCC “Loop” (as conference championships were referred to in the idiom of the time) held at the conclusion of the athletic season. Duluth State's first conference team roster included James Cran, Jack Donaldson, Joe Dubla and Dale Moren with Gus Novotney as an alternate. The team finished its introductory season last among six teams at the conference meet in St. Cloud with an average 18 hole score of 92.

Following the conclusion of the 1946-47 school year, the Minnesota state legislature approved a bill authorizing the transfer of the Duluth State Teachers College to the University of Minnesota system with the school to be known as the University of Minnesota, Duluth Branch or UMD. With an expanded schedule of meets against conference rivals as well as local colleges, the 1948 UMD golf team won two of three triangular meets against Duluth Junior College and Superior State College, defeated Bemidji Teachers College and Saint Cloud Teachers College in another triangular meet and beat Eveleth Junior College in a dual meet. The squad entered the 1948 conference loop more prepared to challenge for the title than in 1947. Improving on the previous year, the team finished third at the TCC golf championship held at Mankato County Club. Jerry Chessen shot a 74 for 18 holes and finished one stroke out of a playoff for individual medalist honors.

== Move to the Minnesota Intercollegiate Athletic Conference ==
In March 1949, UMD left the State Teachers College Conference of Minnesota and joined the larger Minnesota Intercollegiate Athletic Conference (MIAC). Prior to UMD joining, MIAC member schools were private institutions and, for the most part, located in-and-around the Twin Cities area of Minneapolis and Saint Paul and other areas south. This made an odd and, at times, uneasy fit for the state-funded and northern-based UMD. So much so, UMD was granted only probationary status for the first six years of membership for fear it would outgrow the conference. It wasn't until 1954 that conference members voted to extend full membership to UMD with several recalcitrant schools agreeing to full membership only after an amendment was added that allowed a member institution to ask for a conference-level review of the status of any school.

While some MIAC schools feared that UMD would become an overpowering athletic juggernaut, (Note: The UMD hockey team would win 56 straight league play games and six consecutive MIAC titles before electing to become a Division I independent in August of 1961. In its final league game as a member of the MIAC, UMD beat Augsburg College 19-0.) the move to the MIAC, instead, put the nascent UMD golf program at a distinct disadvantage to the other member schools. Springtime weather comes much earlier to the southern portions of Minnesota. Consequently, the UMD golf team often started preparation for the season weeks later than its conference rivals. In fact, weather would become a constant hindrance to the UMD golf program. The Bulldogs would suffer through several instances where the golf season was reduced to a few meets or just the conference championship and the NAIA District 13 tournament. This disadvantage became more acute at the national level where UMD competed against teams from the south and west whose players could play year-round.

With the school having just joined the MIAC at the start of the 1949 golf season, UMD was unable to schedule any meets against conference teams. However, the Bulldogs were undefeated in non-conference competition against the likes of Moorhead State, Michigan Tech, Bemidji State and North Dakota State. Unbeaten, the golf team entered the 1949 MIAC championship very confident despite having never competed against a conference team. This confidence was misplaced and the team unprepared for conference play. Not only did the squad have no knowledge of the caliber of golfers in the meet or familiarity with the Keller Golf Course layout, but Coach Wells in a pre-tournament interview admitted that he did not even know if the championship would be conducted on a stroke play or match play basis. The team combined an off-day with high winds to finish a disappointing 6th place in its first MIAC championship. Having averaged 78 strokes as a team in non-conference play, their conference championship average ballooned to 84 strokes. However, the team was young with only one senior on the squad. Learning from this setback, it would be the last time UMD golfers finished outside the top three in MIAC tournament play over the next 16 years.

== Dominating the MIAC ==
For the 1950 season, the Bulldog golfers got their second coach in five years: Lew Rickert. Rickert would coach the team for the next 25 years. In what would become a nearly annual tradition, poor weather delayed the start of team qualifying causing coach Rickert to assemble a team of only returning lettermen for its first outing against Saint Olaf College. Unfortunately, poor weather followed the team to Northfield Minnesota where winds upward of 50 miles per hour caused players to lose balance while in mid-swing. Matches were abbreviated to nine holes and the meet considered unofficial after two other competing teams walked off the course after playing only a few holes. UMD then traveled to Houghton Michigan where they defeated Michigan Tech in a non-conference encounter. Only after the team's return to Duluth was coach Rickert able to conduct a 36 hole tryout among 20 hopefuls to determine the five golfers to represent UMD on the MIAC tourney squad. Duluth Central high school graduate Andrew "Walt" Bida became UMD's first conference medalist shooting 76-79 (155) over two rounds at the Hiawatha Golf Club in Minneapolis to win the MIAC individual golf title. UMD took the top three MIAC tournament spots with Bill Strang and future PGA professional Rick Liljedahl coming in second and third-place respectively. However, the other two members of the team lagged far behind and the golf team finished third overall for the conference championship, nine strokes behind the winning College of Saint Thomas squad.

In 1951, led by Bida and two-time Minnesota State High School champion and fellow Duluth Central classmate Bob Braff, UMD swept five meets against Michigan Tech (twice), Gustavus Adolphus College, Wisconsin Central State College at Steven Point and Virginia Junior College and won the first of eight MIAC team titles over a 13-year span by edging out defending champion St. Thomas by a single stroke. Bida recorded a second-place finish in the season-ending conference event and Braff third. The golf title was first conference championship won by a UMD athletic program among the ten different sports championships conducted by the MIAC. (Note: Men's hockey followed with a MIAC title in 1953 and cross-country running in 1955. The UMD alpine, jump and nordic ski team won the Saint Olaf Invitational in 1950 which was described by the UMD Statesman in the February 10, 1950 issue as the first conference championship captured by a UMD athletic team although skiing was not a MIAC-sponsored competition according to The History of the Minnesota Intercollegiate Athletic Conference 1920-1970 by John Emil Becker.)

The 1952 squad began the season with its first competition outside its northern base with a Midwest tour against Xavier (Ohio), Vanderbilt University and the University of Kentucky going 1-2. The Bulldogs then defeated and tied Michigan Tech in a home-and-home series and downed conference foes Hamline University, Gustavus Adolphus and the Scots of Macalester College. Favored to repeat as conference champion, the team's number one player Bob Braff came down with the flu on the eve of the MIAC championship at Keller Golf Course and could not play. While UMD's Jack Flatt Jr. carded two 79's (158) to finish as tournament runner-up and Walt Bida and Jerry LaBreche fired identical 80-81 (161), Braff's absence proved crucial as his replacement Bob Alexander averaged 95 over two rounds (while the rest of the team averaged 81) and the Bulldogs finished third, 12 strokes behind champion Saint Thomas.

Men's golf was first recognized by the National Association of Intercollegiate Athletics (NAIA) as an intercollegiate sport in 1952. As a member institution of the NAIA, UMD qualified its golf team for the second annual NAIA national meet in 1953 by winning the MIAC team title by a margin of 31 strokes. By qualifying for the NAIA championship, the golf team joined the 1953 ski team as the first two UMD athletic programs to participate in national competition. (Note: The UMD ski team participated at the 1953 National Intercollegiate 4-Way Ski Championship held in Snow Basin, Utah, finishing eighth out of ten teams. The competition was neither a NAIA or NCAA sponsored event but, instead, a University of Denver and University of Wyoming supported national tournament. Started in 1950, the National Intercollegiate 4-Way Ski Championship was conducted through 1953 at which time the NCAA recognized skiing as an annual title contest and sponsored its own championship for 1954.) In the early years of NAIA golf, very few college programs participated in the national tournament. The 1953 NAIA national tournament in Abilene, Texas was composed of just seven teams and 41 golfers – mostly from schools in the south. Something of a curiosity having traveled so far to participate, the local press reported on the arrival of the UMD team and contrasted the 95 degree weather in Texas with the 40 degree temperatures reported in Duluth. After a strong start with UMD's Richard Kohlbry in fourth place at the 36 hole halfway point, UMD managed a third-place team finish in the tournament with Bob Korsch, John Patrick and Kohlbry finishing individually 11th, 13th and 14th respectively. It would be the highest team finish in a national tournament for any UMD athletic program until equaled by the Bulldog golf team in 1962 and not bettered until 1984 when the UMD men's hockey team finished second at the NCAA Division I tournament.

From 1953-1956, Duluth Denfeld high school graduate John Patrick would lead the UMD golf team to three MIAC team titles and one runner-up finish. Individually, he tied for low score at the 1954 MIAC championship (losing medalist honors in a playoff), another runner-up finish in 1955 and third place in 1956. In addition to Patrick, the 1954 team also featured Duluth Cathedral graduate Leo Spooner who would shoot 68 in his first tryout round and would later become one of the most successful amateur golfers from Minnesota and be inducted into the Minnesota Golf Hall of Fame. Patrick and Spooner were expected to lead the team to back-to-back conference titles with only perennial contender College of Saint Thomas thought to be a threat. But even the Tommies looked to be anything but intimidating after UMD easily beat both Saint Thomas and Virginia Junior College, winning all but one pairing in a triangular meet leading up to the conference championship. At the MIAC tournament, again held at Keller, Leo Spooner led at the halfway mark shooting a 76 with John Patrick one stroke behind at 77. Bob Korsch of UMD was two strokes back of the lead putting UMD in excellent position going into the final 18 holes. Unfortunately, only Patrick finished strong shooting another 77 to tie Jack Harrigan of Saint Thomas at 154 for low score but losing medalist honors on the third playoff hole. Spooner dropped to an 80 and finished tied for third. However, conference championships are usually won or lost by the play of the fourth and fifth men and it was the team from Saint Thomas that prevailed by placing all five of its golfers in the top eight, taking the title with a total score of 788 against 802 for the Bulldogs who finished 50 strokes ahead of third place Macalester College.

Consistency help UMD capture the 1955 MIAC team title by 15 strokes ahead of runner-up Macalester College. John Patrick finished with 76-76 (152) to finish second and Rick Liljedahl, back from two years service in the military, shot 79-74 (153) for his second MIAC individual third-place finish. By virtue of claiming the 1955 MIAC team title, the Bulldogs were eligible for participation at the NAIA national tournament. Again held in Abilene, Texas, the tournament was still at that time a mostly southern dominated contest with five of the participating eight teams from Texas. At the 36 hole halfway point, Ray Ferguson of North Texas State had shot a blistering 66-67 (133) with UMD's top two players Dave Vosika 75-72 (147) and John Patrick 73-75 (148) far behind. The UMD team did not improve on its 1953 finish and ended in sixth place. Individually, only John Patrick finished in the top 25 with a tie for 22nd, 33 strokes behind Ferguson. (Note: Ray Ferguson of North Texas State held the NAIA individual four round record of 273 strokes for 60 years until bested in 2015 by Sean Elliot of Dalton State (GA) with 272.)

The 1956 golf team again won the MIAC title over second-place finisher Gustavus Adolphus College by six strokes with DuWayne Branscombe and John Patrick taking second and third respectively. UMD, however, did not play in the NAIA national tournament that year. The Duluth News Tribune, Duluth Herald, and UMD Statesman newspapers do not record the reason for not participating, but later NAIA tournaments passed up by UMD were due to insufficient funds available for travel and lodging.

Through the 1956 school year, the UMD golf program was the most successful of all the school's athletic programs. Only the UMD hockey program could be considered as successful as golf in the MIAC title count (also with three). In a review of UMD's sports programs since joining the MIAC in 1949, UMD hockey goalie and sports editor of the student newspaper The UMD Statesman (and later UMD hockey coach and Athletic Director) Ralph Romano reminded his readers of the lack of titles coming from the football and basketball programs and lauded the golf, skiing and cross-country teams for its championship wins.

The defending MIAC golf champion Bulldogs entered the 1957 season without its two top players from the previous year: John Patrick having graduated and DuWayne Branscombe lost to ineligibility. Freshman Frank Soderquist - a former teammate of Branscombe at Duluth Denfeld - led the team in qualifying and took the number one spot into the conference meet where he finished second individually and helped propel the team to the runner-up spot seven strokes behind Macalester. Under a new four-man team score format for representation at the NAIA tournament, Gustavus Aldophus - whose five-man team finished third in the MIAC tournament - beat Macalester in a one-hole sudden death playoff after the two team's top four scores ended in a draw at 501. While finishing second at the conference meet, UMD's top four scores were third with 505.

The 1958 squad began the season with two victories in a home-and-home series with Superior State which served as a warm-up to a meet with the University of Minnesota. No athletic team of UMD - a campus of the University of Minnesota system - had ever played a team from the main campus. While historic, the contest was no match. The Bulldogs were handily defeated in losing all five pairings with the Gophers. However, the team rebounded with a win against conference rival Hamline and finished runner-up to Macalester for a second year in a row at the MIAC finals.

With the departure of three members from the 1958 conference runner-up team, Coach Rickert felt he still had a winning team with the addition of Dan McNicoll to the 1959 squad. Although an upperclassman, McNicoll had not played golf for UMD. But he came with a proven record having won several junior tournaments as well as the Nemadji Men's Invitational in 1956 at the age of 18. The team cruised through its pre-conference schedule and headed to the MIAC tournament ready to face two-time defending titlist Macalester. However, the team did not perform to expectation and finished third in the conference championship behind Macalester and runner-up Gustavus with UMD's low man Dan McNicoll tied for sixth individually.

The 1960-1964 UMD golf teams were probably the most dominant of the Lew Rickert era. Anchored by two Duluth Denfeld high school hockey recruits and future UMD Athletic Hall of Fame inductees Tom Maas and Ron Johnson, the teams during this period won four straight MIAC team titles. The 1960 team defeated Superior State twice, Virginia Junior College, Hamline University and Augsburg College. Losing narrowly by four strokes to the College of Saint Thomas in a pre-conference meet, UMD got its revenge on the Tommies two days later by taking home the 1960 MIAC crown – its first in four years – with Tom Maas tied for low individual (losing medalist honors in a playoff). The team participated at the 1960 NAIA national championships held that year in Bemidji, Minnesota. By 1960, the NAIA national golf tournament had grown considerably since UMD's last appearance five years earlier with 18 teams and 140 individuals competing for what was now a truly national title. In sixth place after the first round, the team performed poorly in subsequent rounds and finished a disappointing 12th.

Weather nearly derailed the 1961 season. Late April snow storms delayed the opening of Duluth-area courses into the first week of May resulting in the cancellation of meets and leaving a little more than two weeks for try-outs and preparation for the conference tournament. A rescheduled meet against Superior State was the only pre-MIAC tournament competition UMD was able to accomplish and served as a team tryout. In beating the Yellowjackets. Ron Johnson and Tom Maas showed little rust after the winter lay-off shooting 73 and 77 respectively on a still partially snow-covered Nemadji Golf Course. Despite the truncated season, UMD found its game quickly and successfully defended its MIAC team title by three strokes over Macalester College. Balance was the key to UMD's victory. While no UMD golfer placed in the top three, Jim “Cub” Olson, Ron Johnson and Tom Maas all finished in the top ten with Rolle Hoch just missing out of that group. Unfortunately, while the team earned the right to play in the NAIA national tournament, the athletic department was unable to allocate funds to participate at the Shawnee Oklahoma event.

UMD won the MIAC team title again in 1962 with an even more balanced performance than in 1961 with Jeff Peterson taking second and all five Bulldog golfers finishing in the top eight. Despite winning the MIAC title, a second straight year of poor weather had limited UMD to just two meets against Superior State and one against Hamline University, and the MIAC tournament which qualified the team for the NAIA national tournament taking place in Davenport, Iowa. Nobody gave the team much of a chance; Coach Lew Rickert was "hoping for seventh or eighth place at best." However, the team finished third out of 24 teams entered – just 12 strokes off the winning pace - joining the 1953 golf team as having the best national showing in the history of the UMD golf program. Under NAIA tournament rules, teams could enter five players of which the low four per round counted toward the team total. While first-place Western Illinois University, runner-up Texas Wesleyan, and fourth-place Whitman College all entered five-man teams, UMD played with only four golfers and did not have the advantage of being able to drop its high score. (Note: Tom Maas recalls that while some of the other competing teams arrived at Emeis Golf Course in comfortable buses and vans decorated with team colors and school identification, Lew Rickert drove the UMD team, golf clubs and luggage all packed in the coach's car which did not leave room for fifth-man Terry Peterson.) Individually, against a field of 130 participants, Tom Maas fired a four over par 292 over 72 holes (78-73-71-70) at the par 72 Emeis Golf Course layout to finish second to future PGA Tour winner Steve Spray's 290 of Eastern New Mexico University, the best individual finish in golf program history and the highest showing for any UMD sport until surpassed in 1987 by national wrestling champion Mike Hirschey. (Note: Mike Hirschey won the NAIA wrestling title in the 158-pound category becoming UMD's first individual national champion. In 2003, he was shot to death by an acquaintance following an altercation at a party in Park City, Utah.) Ron Johnson – tied for fourth after regulation play – sank a 50-yard wedge shot for eagle three on the first playoff hole to take fourth place outright. Both Maas and Johnson were awarded NAIA All-American First Team honors for their performances – UMD's first All-American First Team honorees in any sport. (Note: UMD's Dick Pesonen was selected AP Little All-American Honorable Mention for football in 1959. Ron Kostiliz and John Nachtsheim were awarded NAIA All-American Second Team honors, also for football, in 1961.)

With Tom Maas and Ron Johnson returning as seniors in 1963, expectations were high that UMD could repeat its 1962 MIAC and NAIA performances. However, at a meet against conference rival Saint John's University on the eve of the MIAC tournament, Maas suffered a corneal scratch when a piece of dirt deflected off of his club and into his eye while executing a shot. Unable to compete the next day at the MIAC tournament, 6th man Rollie Hoch had to make a quick drive down to Saint Paul to substitute for Maas. A third-place effort by freshman Jim Sauntry along with solid play by the rest of the team allowed the Bulldogs to retain the MIAC team title by just two strokes over Macalester College. It was UMD's fourth team title in a row and eighth overall in 15 years of MIAC play. The team's NAIA hopes were dashed, however, when school finances prevented the team from participating at the national tournament.

== MIAC format changes handicaps UMD ==
The year 1964 brought the introduction of a unique scoring system to determine the Minnesota Intercollegiate Athletic golf champion. Prior to the change, conference members scheduled their own meets on an individual basis; the outcomes of which did not count toward the conference championship. Typically, the Bulldogs would play a regular season schedule of meets with non-conference teams in addition to some conference foes. The only meet officially set up by the conference was the season-ending MIAC tournament which alone determined the conference champion. With the change, however, MIAC officials took over the scheduling of all meets between conference members. Every conference member would play each other and each meet counted as a win or loss with points assigned to each individual match to determine the victor of the meet. The MIAC tournament was reduced to just another meet albeit featuring every team in the conference and considerably more points up for grabs. The conference championship was awarded to the team which accumulated the most points from both the regular season meets and the conference meet.

The practical effect of the new scoring system was to harm northern-based UMD because of late winter weather not usually seen in the southern parts of the state (and where every other member of the conference was located). Under the old scheduling system, UMD was able to pick opponents without fear of early season losses costing it a chance at the title. However, with every meet now counting toward the championship, the UMD golf team was at a distinct disadvantage to other conference teams who often had weeks of practice prior to the beginning of the season. The impact on UMD was seen immediately; the golf team went into its first triangular meet of the 1964 season against Augsburg College and Concordia University without having a practice much less a finalized team and a second triangular against Macalester College and Saint Mary's University with only 27 holes of tryouts. Both of the Bulldogs' losses for the season occurred during these first two triangular meets and cost UMD a chance at the conference title for 1964. However, the team finished strong with a 6-2 conference record and added runner-up honors at the season-ending MIAC meet. Overall, UMD finished second to Macalaster for the conference crown.

Weather again intervened as UMD participated in their first triangular meet of the 1965 season with no practice or tryouts for five returning golfers from the prior year squad losing to both Gustavus Adolphus College and Hamline University. With only one practice, the Bulldogs next participated at the Cougar Invitational Golf Tournament which served as the NAIA District 13 qualifying event for the national tournament. (Note: Beginning in 1965, MIAC member schools no longer qualified teams for the national NAIA tournament out of the MIAC Championship but through the NAIA District 13 tournament which included other conferences within the district.) Coach Rickert strongly objected to the timing of the tournament (May 1) as UMD - having played just two rounds - was a great disadvantage to competing schools. Predictably, UMD finished sixth in the tourney and had no individuals among the top four moving on to represent Minnesota at the national tournament. Poor playing conditions and inconsistent conference play had UMD entering the season-ending MIAC tournament behind Macalaster, St. Thomas and Concordia, but a second-place team finish led by third place individual efforts from both Jim Sauntry and Gary Kaskela moved UMD into second place for the conference title.

In 1966, the Bulldog golf team's fortunes rested on the shoulders of yet another Duluth Denfeld graduate, Dave Hicks. Better known as a member of the U.S. Olympic ski jump team in 1964 and the U.S. National ski jump champion in 1965, Hicks also proved to be one of the best golfers in UMD program history. Not even mentioned in pre-season articles as a candidate for the team in 1966, Hicks, nonetheless, became the second UMD golfer to capture MIAC tournament individual medalist honors. While the team finished a disappointing third at the MIAC tournament and fourth in conference - UMD's worse showing since 1949, Hicks individually qualified for the NAIA national tournament finishing in 25th place.

Dave Hicks started the 1967 season right where he left off in 1966 by shooting 74 at Keller Golf Course and taking medalist honors at UMD's first triangular meet of the season against St. Thomas and Hamline. With Mark A. Carlson also having solid season, the Bulldogs rebounded from the prior year decline and compiled a 6-2 conference record, a second place showing at both the MIAC tournament and the NAIA District 13 qualifier and finished second in conference. Hicks led all golfers at the MIAC meet firing a three-over par 111 over 27 holes to repeat as conference medalist. Hicks and Mark A. Carlson both individually qualified for the NAIA national tournament. While Carlson missed the 36 hole cut, Hicks found himself tied for 7th place after three rounds - six strokes behind leader John Bohmann of Texas Lutheran University. However, a final round 78 pushed him down the final leader board into a three-way tie for 21st.

== Long interregnum ==
An 11-year stretch of mostly unremarkable UMD golf results began with the departure of four lettermen from the 1967 conference runner-up team. With one lone returnee, the 1968 squad finished with an indifferent 4-4 dual meet record which left the team tied for fourth in conference going into the MIAC championship held at Stillwater Country Club. A 7th place showing at that tournament caused the Bulldogs to tumble in the standings and finish 7th overall in conference – the worst conference showing in the history of the golf program – and eliminated the team from playing in the NAIA District 13 Tournament.

In 1969, MIAC officials eliminated the regular season schedule instituted in 1964 and returned the season-ending MIAC tournament as the exclusive contest to determine the conference champion; the tournament itself becoming a two-day event. MIAC-member schools were free again to plan their own schedules and level of competition. While the other MIAC schools continued to compete at both meets and inter-collegiate tournaments, UMD - at probably the low point of the golf program - eliminated participation in all but the MIAC tournament and the Honeywell Collegiate Invitational which served as the NAIA District 13 national qualifying contest. The diminution of the golf program to something that more resembled a recreational sport activity had predictable results: the 1969 golf team finished 5th in the conference and 16th at the NAIA District 13 tournament. Not until 1976 and after a change in conferences would UMD participate in events outside of the conference championship and the NAIA qualifier.

In 1970, a freshman from Duluth Central High School named Lyn Ellingson provided lift for what otherwise would have been several years of mediocre teams. Recruited by UMD for hockey, Ellingson led the golf team in scoring in conference play for four straight years. As a freshman, he finished fourth individually at the conference championship. Ellingson was the MIAC individual medalist in 1971 and runner-up by one stroke in both 1972 and 1973. The play of Ellingson allowed the team to finish 2nd the MIAC conference tournament in both 1970 and 1971 as well as the NAIA District 13 tournament in 1971. But the bench behind Ellingson was thin and UMD could only muster a 6th and 4th-place finish respectively at the MIAC championship in 1972 and 1973 and far down the pack at the NAIA District 13 tournaments.

Nineteen seventy-four marked the end of Lew Rickert's long tenure as golf coach with his retirement. While his teams brought home eight MIAC titles, seven NAIA national tournament berths and two third-place finishes at the NAIA, the squad in his final year could do no better than fifth in conference and 13th at the district tournament.

Dave Hopkins was appointed golf coach for the 1975 season. His team responded by placing an unexpected second in the MIAC conference tournament for the first year coach. Interviewed by the Duluth News Tribune, an exuberant coach Hopkins said that the MIAC result was “the best finish for UMD in 15 years”. This, of course, was incorrect as UMD had placed 1st four times and 2nd five times in the conference championship in the prior 15 years but accurately reflected the perception that the teams of late had been lackluster.

== Rejoining the Northern Intercollegiate Conference ==
The 1976 spring season marked the last year that UMD golfers would play in the Minnesota Intercollegiate Athletic Conference. Senior Dennis Nelson led the Bulldogs with a sixth-place finish individually at the MIAC tournament and the team took fourth. After a 28-year absence, University administrators decided to rejoin the former State Teacher's College Conference of Minnesota – renamed the Northern Intercollegiate Conference (NIC) – for the 1976-77 school year. Despite having joined the MIAC 15 years after its inception, the UMD golf team had won the second most MIAC titles (8) behind Macalester (11) when it left the conference.

The move to the NIC had many implications for the UMD golf program. Conference play would now be during the fall season instead of spring. With fall having better weather in the Duluth area and coming off of summer play, UMD golfers would be better positioned to compete against rival schools. The move also meant that UMD would be playing a split season: conference golf in the fall and national tournament qualifying golf in the spring. With the University on a quarterly schedule and students matriculating or graduating at different times of the year, the golf team roster was often impacted by team members either beginning or leaving school between the fall and spring seasons.

== Reemergence ==
Since moving to the NIC in the fall of 1976, the Bulldog golf team had not enjoyed much success in conference play placing 4th at the conference championship in its first year and 3rd in 1977. However, Larry Opatz became UMD's first conference medalist in six years by taking the individual scoring title in 1977. But with the move to the NIC, the UMD golf program under coach Dave Hopkins undertook a strategic shift to compete in tournaments that would impact its visibility toward gaining NCAA Division II invitations and elevate the program back to relevance. UMD had dual affiliation with the NAIA and NCAA since 1955 but the golf program had not participated in any NCAA-sponsored tournaments. However, unlike the NAIA national tournament whose participants were determined (at that time) by winning NAIA district tournaments (and where a single bad round could end a team's chances of moving on to the national tournament), the NCAA Division II national tournament field was determined by a selection committee. Criteria for selection were tournament finishes relative to schools of the same level and the caliber of tournaments the team played. The NCAA also had the advantage of paying for travel and lodging for national tournament participants whereas the NAIA did not. For a budget-strapped team like UMD, this made for a more attractive alternative for post-conference play. For most of the program's existence, the UMD golf team had primarily participated in meets against regional teams and conference foes in preparation for the conference championship and the NAIA District 13 tournament. Having a strategic preference for NCAA Division II invitations, the Bulldogs now started to compete in large multiple-team tournaments throughout the Midwest against schools outside its division and conference. This strategy yielded dividends in May 1978 when Richard Kirby and Larry Opatz of UMD were individually selected to play in the NCAA Division II tournament. Both golfers finished well back with Kirby placing 87th and Opatz 98th but it was just the beginning of a long streak of national appearances for UMD.

The fall of 1978 saw big changes for the UMD golf program. Behind the scenes, George Fisher took over as coach of the team after four years under Dave Hopkins. More importantly, two players were added to the team that would propel the UMD golf program to success not seen since the early 1960s. The first was Lee Kolquist, a native Duluthian and a sophomore transfer from the University of Wisconsin Superior. The other was freshman Tom Waitrovich from Appleton, Wisconsin. Both would attain All-American honors and lead the UMD golf program back onto the national scene.

UMD's NIC fortunes changed with Lee Kolquist winning medalist honors at the 1978 conference championship boosting the team to a second-place finish. While finishing only 5th at the NAIA district 13 tournament, the team's performance at the University of Minnesota Invitational and its win at Northern State Invitational earned them an invite to the 1979 NCAA Division II tournament, the first of seven consecutive national appearances. While finishing a disappointing 19th as a team, Kolquist was named NCAA Division II All-American Honorable Mention.

For the 1979-80 golf season, UMD had one of its finest results in its history winning both the Saint Cloud State Men's Golf Invitational (Kolquist earning medalist honors) and the Northern Intercollegiate Conference Golf Championship, taking runner-up honors at the North Country Invitational, and finishing third at the Northern Iowa Classic (Kolquist again medalist). More significantly, the Bulldog golfers captured both the NIC and NAIA District 13 crowns with UMD's Rich Kirby and Lee Kolquist sharing low score at the district tournament (Kirby taking medalist honors in a playoff.) Having been selected for the NCAA Division II tournament and winning its way to the NAIA tournament, UMD for the only time in its history played both national tournaments. At the Division II tournament, the golf team improved over its prior year finish and took 11th place. A week later, it placed 14th at the NAIA. Individually, Kolquist finished 11th at the NAIA and was awarded All-American First Team honors.

UMD followed on that season with an even more spectacular 1980-81 campaign. The Bulldogs took first at the Southern Minnesota Invitational and second at both the Northern Iowa Classic and the Gulf Stream Golf Intercollegiate Tournament (Kolquist winning medalist honors at the Southern Minnesota and Northern Iowa events). While finishing second to Mankato State at the conference championship, the Bulldogs again took the NAIA District 13 title qualifying the team for the NAIA nationals. NIC rules, however, had changed to prevent a team from playing in more than one national event. UMD accepted an invitation to the NCAA Division II national tournament instead of taking the NAIA spot. The team placed fifth for the tournament, its highest national showing since the 1962's third-place finish and senior Lee Kolquist was ninth in individual standings earning him a spot on the NCAA Division II All-American Second team.

With the graduation of Lee Kolquist, leadership of the 1981-82 squad fell on senior Tom Waitrovich. Waitrovich had performed solidly in his first three years on the team including a runner-up finish at the 1980 NIC golf championship, two NIC all-conference team selections as well as being named to the NAIA District 13 all-district team in 1980. However, he was nearly always overshadowed by the play of Kolquist. He responded by leading the team as medalist to victory at the Mankato State Invitational as well as winning the NIC individual title while the team came in second. The Bulldogs then claimed their third straight NAIA District 13 team title. The victory earned UMD an automatic bid to the NAIA national tournament but an NCAA Division II at-large invitation was accepted instead. Waitrovich finished 12th individually at the NCAA tournament and received All-American second team honors. The rest of the team, however, finished down the pack and the Bulldogs placed 10th among 11 teams.

The 1982-83 team continued UMD's winning ways. Led by sophomores Reed Kolquist and John Spreiter, the Bulldogs captured the NIC title outdistancing second place Winona State by a conference record of 47 strokes. Reed Kolquist was the NIC individual medalist. The team also won the NAIA District 13 title for the fourth straight year (by 25 strokes) with Spreiter, Kolquist and Jerry Kirby finishing in the top three positions respectively. Earning a trip to the NAIA national tournament, UMD again chose to instead accept an NCAA Division II spot. Because of their dominant play, the team had expectations of a high finish at nationals but placed a disappointing 14th. However, both Kolquist and Spreiter were selected to the NCAA Division II Honorable Mention team.

With only two seniors graduating from the prior year's team, UMD was in good position to continue its winning ways for the 1983-84 season. In five tournaments leading up the NIC Conference championship, the Bulldogs finished ahead of 39 division teams and behind only two. However, UMD was upset by Bemidji State to finished second for the NIC conference title. In March 1984, coach George Fisher resigned from UMD to become the head men's basketball coach at Cal Poly Pamona and James “Butch” Kuronen took over the helm of the golf team. Now fully committed to an NCAA Division II pathway, the team elected to not participate at the NAIA District 13 tournament that spring and would not return for another three years. In its sixth straight NCAA Division II appearance, UMD was looking to break through to a top three finish. But in a repeat of the year before, the Bulldogs again finished in 14th place and Reed Kolquist and John Spreiter were named to their second consecutive NCAA Division II Honorable Mention team.

The 1984-85 team entered the season as a co-favorite with Bemidji State to take the NIC title. The championship held at UMD's home course Northland Country Club saw the Bulldogs take back the team title, while John Spreiter took medalist honors for the tournament and teammate Scott Rauvola finished 2nd. Going into the spring portion of the season saw a strong UMD team get stronger with the addition of Kyle Anderson, a transfer from Division I North Texas State University and former two-time Minnesota Class AA high school state champion from Duluth East. Again eschewing the NAIA District 13 tournament, the team won its first tournament coming out of the winter break but uncharacteristically struggled through the remainder of its spring schedule playing just well enough to earn its 7th straight NCAA Division II berth. Competing against the likes of future U.S. Open winner Lee Janzen, UMD finished in 11th place with John Spreiter earning All-American Second Team honors and Kyle Anderson All-American Honorable Mention.

Despite losing Reed Kolquist and John Spreiter to graduation and with only one senior, the 1985-1986 UMD team was still potent. After finishing well in several tournaments, UMD won its second straight NIC title. Kyle Anderson took home medalist honors and teammates Scott Rauvola and Larry Pajari finished 2nd and 3rd respectively. However, UMD's excellent fall golf did not carry over to the spring season as the Bulldogs were never able to finish well enough to garner an eighth consecutive NCAA invite. However, Kyle Anderson earned an individual invite to the national tournament finishing in a tie for 26th which was good enough to earn him All-American Third Team honors.

== End of the program ==
After nine straight years of qualifying the team or individuals for national tournament play, it was probably inevitable that UMD would have a period of falloff. Not that the 1986-87 and 1987-88 seasons were poor: The Bulldogs would finish second in conference in each of the two years and Paul Paoletti took medalist honors at the NIC in 1987. Returning to NAIA play for the first time in four years, the team finished second at the District 13 tournament in 1987. However, the Bulldogs did not earn a place at either the NCAA or NAIA national tournaments so anything less was a disappointment.

The Bulldogs returned to form for the 1988-89 campaign. Although the team finished second at the NIC, senior Joe Riekena closed his collegiate career by taking home medalist honors at the conference tournament and becoming the 12th (and final) Bulldog to win an individual conference title. At the NAIA District 13 tournament, UMD captured the title – the first in six years – and earned a place at the NAIA national tournament held in Bay City, Michigan. Having no player with national tournament exposure, the inexperience of the team showed with the Bulldogs placing 26th at the halfway point and missing the cut with only the top 17 teams advancing to the final two rounds.

The 1989-90 season saw the Bulldogs in a reprise of the prior year. A second-place finish at the conference championship would be the fourth in a row for the Bulldogs. However, the team would capture its 6th NAIA District 13 championship and earn its 17th national tournament berth (including three NAIA tournaments - 1956, 1961 and 1963 - for which it qualified but did not appear). Again, the Bulldogs missed the team cut but freshman Greg Tuttle – a former Minnesota Class A High School golf champion – individually qualified for the final two rounds and finished 16th which earned him NAIA All-American Honorable Mention. Also, Paul Shromoff was named NAIA Scholar-Athlete in golf.

The 1990-91 season would be the last for the UMD golf program. A young squad with only three returning players, two being sophomores, the team played inconsistently and could never string together consecutive competitive rounds. This was evident at the NIC conference championship that October at which the team finished in third place - its worst conference showing in 13 years. The spring season saw the Bulldogs play in five events including the NCAA Division II District 4 tournament held at Purdue University in West Lafayette Indiana. Much like the fall season before, the squad did not fare well although Greg Tuttle took home medalist honors at the Milwaukee Invitational. Having learned the day before the NAIA District 13 qualifying tournament that the golf program would be cut for the 1991-92 school year, the Bulldog golfers were determined to win the District 13 championship and finish up the program with a final NAIA national appearance. However, according to freshman Mike McDonald, the team was “trying too hard instead of just letting it happen” and finished third. Coach Butch Kuronen laid blame for the team's play on the news of the program being eliminated.

Confronted with a $130,000 revenue reduction for the 1991-92 school year, the UMD athletic department dropped both men's and women's golf (along with cross country skiing) from its 18-sport program. According to Athletic Director Bruce McLeod, the program was too expensive given the number of participants. Despite being one of the University's oldest and most successful athletic programs, men's golf was always low on the list of UMD athletic priorities with a budget to match. (Note: UMD Statesman sports writer Robert Tomich noted that the UMD golf program "has traditionally fallen somewhere between fencing and women's boxing on the unwritten list of Bulldog athletic priorities.") (Note: In 1995, the UMD athletic department again found itself with a budget deficit of approximately $155,000. In response, the school dropped its very successful wrestling program whose history included 24 All-Americans, 50 conference champions and UMD's first national champion in any sport. Basketball coach Dale Race dismissed the controversy surrounding the elimination of another successful minor sport program at UMD by saying in an interview that "Nobody wrestles. Nobody cares about wrestling." - Minneapolis Star Tribune July 15, 1996, Page A6.)

At the time of its elimination, the men's golf team had earned more national tournament appearances than UMD hockey, football and basketball programs combined. (Note: To be fair, the NAIA did not have a national men's hockey championship until 1968. UMD took home eight MIAC hockey titles prior to abandoning that conference in August of 1961 to join the NCAA Division I as an independent. Those MIAC championship teams did not have the opportunity to participate in a national tournament. The UMD golf team also won a MIAC title in 1951 before the NAIA held a national tournament for that sport.) (Note: Golf (21) Team - (NAIA: 1953, 1955, 1956, 1960, 1961, 1962, 1963, 1980, 1989, 1990), (NCAA: 1979, 1980, 1981, 1982, 1983, 1984, 1985), Individual - (NAIA: 1966, 1967), (NCAA: 1978, 1986). Hockey (3) - NCAA: 1983, 1984, 1985. Football (0). Basketball (11) - (NAIA: 1958, 1959, 1985, 1986, 1987, 1988, 1989, 1990, 1991), (NCAA: 1957, 1965).) After finishing in 5th place at the 1981 NCAA Division II championship, coach George Fisher remarked that: "A team that has to play in Northern Minnesota and a team that plays without athletic scholarships and still finishes only eight shots out of second place - well, that is just a great accomplishment."

== UMD Athletic Hall of Fame inductees ==
- Lee Kolquist - dual sport with baseball (1993)
- Ron Johnson - dual sport with hockey (2009)
- George Fisher (2012)
- Tom Maas (2013)
- Dave Hicks - dual sport with ski jumping (2016)
- Tom Waitrovich (2017)

== All-American honorees ==
- Tom Maas - NAIA All American First Team (1962)
- Ron Johnson - NAIA All American First Team (1962)
- Lee Kolquist - NCAA Division II All American Honorable Mention (1979)
- Lee Kolquist - NAIA All American First Team (1980)
- Lee Kolquist - NCAA Division II All American Second Team (1981)
- Tom Waitrovich - NCAA Division II All American Second Team (1982)
- Reed Kolquist - NCAA Division II All American Honorable Mention (1983)
- John Spreiter - NCAA Division II All American Honorable Mention (1983)
- Reed Kolquist - NCAA Division II All American Honorable Mention (1984)
- John Spreiter - NCAA Division II All American Honorable Mention (1984)
- John Spreiter - NCAA Division II All American Second Team (1985)
- Kyle Anderson - NCAA Division II All American Honorable Mention (1985)
- Kyle Anderson - NCAA Division II All American Third Team (1986)
- Greg Tuttle - NAIA All American Honorable Mention (1990)
- Paul Shromoff - NAIA Scholar Athlete (1990)

== Top ten national finishes ==
Team

- Bob Korsch, John Patrick, Richard Kohlbry, Jerry LeBreche: 3rd - NAIA (1953)
- John Patrick, Dave Vosika, Rick Liljedahl, Frank Holappa: 6th - NAIA (1955)
- Tom Maas, Ron Johnson, Jeff Peterson, Leon Molstad: 3rd - NAIA (1962)
- Lee Kolquist, John Retica, Tom Waitrovich, Jerry Kirby, Craig Rauvola: 5th - NCAA Division II (1981)
- Tom Waitrovich, Jerry Kirby, Reed Kolquist, Craig Rauvola, Rich Kirby: 10th - NCAA Division II (1982)

Individual

- Tom Maas - 2nd NAIA (1962)
- Ron Johnson - 4th NAIA (1962)
- Lee Kolquist - 9th NCAA Division II (1981)

== Individual conference champions ==
Minnesota Intercollegiate Athletic Conference

- Walt Bida (1950)
- John Patrick (1954)+
- Tom Maas (1960)+
- Dave Hicks (1966)
- Dave Hicks (1967)
- Lyn Ellingson (1971)

Northern Intercollegiate Conference

- Larry Opatz (1977)
- Lee Kolquist (1978)
- Tom Waitrovich (1981)
- Reed Kolquist (1982)
- John Spreiter (1984)
- Kyle Anderson (1985)
- Paul Paoletti (1987)
- Joe Riekena (1988)

+ Lost medalist honors in playoff

== NAIA District 13 champions ==
- Rich Kirby (1980)
- Lee Kolquist (1980)+
- John Spreiter (1983)

+ Lost medalist honors in playoff

== Team conference, district and national finishes ==
Year	Conference	Conference finish	NAIA District 13 finish	National event	National finish	Year	Conference	Conference Finish	NAIA District 13 finish	National event	National finish
1947	TCC	6th	Not held	Not held	-	1970	MIAC	2nd	10th	DNQ	-
1948	TCC	3rd	Not held	Not held	-	1971	MIAC	2nd	2nd	DNQ	-
1949	MIAC	6th	Not held	Not held	-	1972	MIAC	6th	12th	DNQ	-
1950	MIAC	3rd	Not held	Not held	-	1973	MIAC	4th	11th	DNQ	-
1951	MIAC	1st	Not held	Not held	-	1974	MIAC	5th	13th	DNQ	-
1952	MIAC	3rd	Not held	DNQ	-	1975	MIAC	2nd	7th	DNQ	-
1953	MIAC	1st	Not held	NAIA	3rd	1976	MIAC	4th	9th	DNQ	-
1954	MIAC	2nd	Not held	DNQ	-	1976-77	NIC	4th	11th	DNQ	-
1955	MIAC	1st	Not held	NAIA	6th	1977-78	NIC	3rd	DNP	DNQ	-
1956	MIAC	1st	Not held	DNP	-	1978-79	NIC	2nd	5th	NCAA Div II	19th
1957	MIAC	2nd	Not held	DNQ	-	1979-80	NIC	1st	1st	NCAA Div II / NAIA	11th / 14th
1958	MIAC	2nd	Not held	DNQ	-	1980-81	NIC	2nd	1st	NCAA Div II	5th
1959	MIAC	3rd	Not held	DNQ	-	1981-82	NIC	2nd	1st	NCAA Div II	10th
1960	MIAC	1st	Not held	NAIA	12th	1982-83	NIC	1st	1st	NCAA Div II	14th
1961	MIAC	1st	Not held	DNP	-	1983-84	NIC	2nd	DNP	NCAA Div II	14th
1962	MIAC	1st	Not held	NAIA	3rd	1984-85	NIC	1st	DNP	NCAA Div II	11th
1963	MIAC	1st	Not held	DNP	-	1985-86	NIC	1st	DNP	DNQ	-
1964	MIAC	2nd	Not held	DNQ	-	1986-87	NIC	2nd	2nd	DNQ	-
1965	MIAC	2nd	6th	DNQ	-	1987-88	NIC	2nd	DNP	DNQ	-
1966	MIAC	4th	7th	DNQ	-	1988-89	NIC	2nd	1st	NAIA	CUT
1967	MIAC	2nd	2nd	DNQ	-	1989-90	NIC	2nd	1st	NAIA	CUT
1968	MIAC	7th	DNP	DNQ	-	1990-91	NIC	3rd	3rd	DNQ	-
1969	MIAC	5th	16th	DNQ	-						

TCC = State Teacher's College Conference of Minnesota
MIAC = Minnesota Intercollegiate Athletic Conference
NIC = Northern Intercollegiate Conference
DNP = Did not play
DNQ = Did not qualify
CUT = Missed the half-way cut

== Head coaches ==
- Ward Wells (1947-1949)
- Lew Rickert (1950-1974)
- Dave Hopkins (1975-1978)
- George Fisher (1978-1983)
- James "Butch" Kuronen (1984-1991)

== Professional Golf Association members ==
- Kyle Anderson
- Mark A. Carlson
- Mark S. Carlson
- Keith Duff
- Dave Hicks
- Lee Kolquist
- Rick Liljedahl
- Peter Nervick
- John Patrick
- Tom Waitrovich
