= Minnesota's 6th Senate district =

American legislative district

Minnesota's 6th State Senate district
Senator
Keri Heintzeman; R–Nisswa
since 2025
- Population (2020): 86,026

The 2022-2030 Minnesota Senate 6th district includes most of Crow Wing County, parts of Cass and Itasca Counties, and the cities of Brainerd, Baxter, Crosby, and Grand Rapids. As of 2026, the district is represented by Republican Keri Heintzeman.

== List of senators ==
Session	Image	Senator	Party	Term start	Term end	Home	Location
1st		Aaron C. Hudson	Republican	December 2, 1857	December 6, 1859	Florence	Goodhue
2nd		Robert Neil MacLaren	Non-partisan	December 7, 1859	January 6, 1862	Red Wing	Goodhue
3rd		Robert Neil MacLaren	Non-partisan	December 7, 1859	January 6, 1862	Red Wing	Goodhue
3rd		Robert Neil MacLaren	Non-partisan	December 7, 1859	January 6, 1862	Monticello	Carver Goodhue Kandiyohi McLeod Meeker Monongalia (defunct) Wright
3rd		Samuel Bennett	Republican	January 8, 1861	January 5, 1863	Monticello	Carver Goodhue Kandiyohi McLeod Meeker Monongalia (defunct) Wright
4th		Samuel Bennett	Republican	January 8, 1861	January 5, 1863	Monticello	Carver Goodhue Kandiyohi McLeod Meeker Monongalia (defunct) Wright
5th		Charles A. Warner	Non-partisan	January 6, 1863	January 2, 1865	Chaska	Carver Goodhue Kandiyohi McLeod Meeker Monongalia (defunct) Wright
6th		Charles A. Warner	Non-partisan	January 6, 1863	January 2, 1865	Chaska	Carver Goodhue Kandiyohi McLeod Meeker Monongalia (defunct) Wright
7th		G.D. George	Non-partisan	January 3, 1865	January 7, 1867	Rockford	Carver Goodhue Kandiyohi McLeod Meeker Monongalia (defunct) Wright
8th		G.D. George	Non-partisan	January 3, 1865	January 7, 1867	Rockford	Carver Goodhue Kandiyohi McLeod Meeker Monongalia (defunct) Wright
9th		Hanford Lennox Gordon	Republican	January 8, 1867	January 7, 1869	St. Cloud	Kandiyohi McLeod Meeker Monongalia (defunct) Wright
10th		Hanford Lennox Gordon	Republican	January 8, 1867	January 7, 1869	St. Cloud	Kandiyohi McLeod Meeker Monongalia (defunct) Wright
11th		Dana E. King	Republican	January 8, 1869	January 2, 1871	Greenleaf	Kandiyohi McLeod Meeker Monongalia (defunct) Wright
12th		Dana E. King	Republican	January 8, 1869	January 2, 1871	Greenleaf	Kandiyohi McLeod Meeker Monongalia (defunct) Wright
13th		William Bonniwell	Democratic	January 3, 1871	January 1, 1872	Hutchinson	Kandiyohi McLeod Meeker Monongalia (defunct) Wright
14th		Edward Harrison Hutchins	Republican	January 2, 1872	January 5, 1874	Winnebago	Faribault
15th		Edward Harrison Hutchins	Republican	January 2, 1872	January 5, 1874	Winnebago	Faribault
16th		Simeon P. Child	Republican	January 6, 1874	January 3, 1876	Blue Earth	Faribault
17th		Simeon P. Child	Republican	January 6, 1874	January 3, 1876	Blue Earth	Faribault
18th		J.P. West	Republican	January 4, 1876	January 7, 1878	Wells	Faribault
19th		J.P. West	Republican	January 4, 1876	January 7, 1878	Wells	Faribault
20th		Daniel F. Goodrich	Republican	January 8, 1878	January 6, 1879	Blue Earth	Faribault
21st		Rial B. Johnson	Non-partisan	January 7, 1879	January 1, 1883	Blue Earth	Faribault
22nd		Rial B. Johnson	Non-partisan	January 7, 1879	January 1, 1883	Blue Earth	Faribault
23rd		Reuben M. Ward	Non-partisan	January 2, 1883	January 3, 1887	Fairmont	Jackson Martin
24th		Reuben M. Ward	Non-partisan	January 2, 1883	January 3, 1887	Fairmont	Jackson Martin
25th		Frank A. Day	Republican	January 4, 1887	January 31, 1895	Fairmont	Jackson Martin
26th		Frank A. Day	Republican	January 4, 1887	January 31, 1895	Fairmont	Jackson Martin
27th		Frank A. Day	Republican	January 4, 1887	January 31, 1895	Fairmont	Jackson Martin
28th		Frank A. Day	Republican	January 4, 1887	January 31, 1895	Fairmont	Jackson Martin
29th		Frank A. Day	Republican	January 4, 1887	January 31, 1895	Fairmont	Jackson Martin
30th		Frank A. Day	Republican	January 4, 1887	January 31, 1895	Fairmont	Jackson Martin
30th		Vacant		January 31, 1895	January 26, 1897		Jackson Martin
30th		Howard Dunn	Republican	January 26, 1897	January 2, 1899	Fairmont	Freeborn Martin Watonwan
31st		Sam Sweningsen	Republican	January 3, 1899	January 5, 1905	Austin	Mower
32nd		Sam Sweningsen	Republican	January 3, 1899	January 5, 1905	Austin	Mower
33rd		Alexander S. Campbell	Republican	January 6, 1905	January 6, 1919	Austin	Mower
34th		Alexander S. Campbell	Republican	January 6, 1905	January 6, 1919	Austin	Mower
35th		Alexander S. Campbell	Republican	January 6, 1905	January 6, 1919	Austin	Dodge Mower
36th		Alexander S. Campbell	Republican	January 6, 1905	January 6, 1919	Austin	Dodge Mower
37th		Bernhart N. Anderson	Republican	January 7, 1919	January 1, 1923	Manchester	Freeborn
38th		Bernhart N. Anderson	Republican	January 7, 1919	January 1, 1923	Manchester	Freeborn
39th		Bernhart N. Anderson	Republican	January 7, 1919	January 1, 1923	Manchester	Freeborn
40th		Bernhart N. Anderson	Republican	January 7, 1919	January 1, 1923	Manchester	Freeborn
41st		Bernhart N. Anderson	Republican	January 7, 1919	January 1, 1923	Manchester	Freeborn
42nd		Bernhart N. Anderson	Republican	January 7, 1919	January 1, 1923	Manchester	Freeborn
43rd		William Nelson	Non-partisan	January 2, 1923	January 3, 1927	Albert Lea	Freeborn
44th		William Nelson	Non-partisan	January 2, 1923	January 3, 1927	Albert Lea	Freeborn
45th		J.O. Peterson	Non-partisan	January 4, 1927	January 5, 1931	Albert Lea	Freeborn
46th		J.O. Peterson	Non-partisan	January 4, 1927	January 5, 1931	Albert Lea	Freeborn
47th		J.S. McCornack	Non-partisan	January 6, 1931	January 7, 1935	Bancroft	Freeborn
48th		J.S. McCornack	Non-partisan	January 6, 1931	January 7, 1935	Bancroft	Freeborn
49th		Alfred Berglund, Sr.	Non-partisan	January 8, 1935	January 6, 1947	Albert Lea	Freeborn
50th		Alfred Berglund, Sr.	Non-partisan	January 8, 1935	January 6, 1947	Albert Lea	Freeborn
51st		Alfred Berglund, Sr.	Non-partisan	January 8, 1935	January 6, 1947	Albert Lea	Freeborn
52nd		Alfred Berglund, Sr.	Non-partisan	January 8, 1935	January 6, 1947	Albert Lea	Freeborn
53rd		Alfred Berglund, Sr.	Non-partisan	January 8, 1935	January 6, 1947	Albert Lea	Freeborn
54th		Alfred Berglund, Sr.	Non-partisan	January 8, 1935	January 6, 1947	Albert Lea	Freeborn
55th		Helmer Myre	Non-partisan	January 7, 1947	January 1, 1951	Albert Lea	Freeborn
56th		Helmer Myre	Non-partisan	January 7, 1947	January 1, 1951	Albert Lea	Freeborn
57th		Earl L. Engbritson	Conservative	January 2, 1951	January 3, 1955	Hollandale	Freeborn
58th		Earl L. Engbritson	Conservative	January 2, 1951	January 3, 1955	Hollandale	Freeborn
59th		Rudolph William Hanson	Conservative	January 4, 1955	January 7, 1963	Albert Lea	Freeborn
60th		Rudolph William Hanson	Conservative	January 4, 1955	January 7, 1963	Albert Lea	Freeborn
61st		Rudolph William Hanson	Conservative	January 4, 1955	January 7, 1963	Albert Lea	Freeborn
62nd		Rudolph William Hanson	Conservative	January 4, 1955	January 7, 1963	Albert Lea	Freeborn
63rd		Charles G. Langley	Conservative	January 8, 1963	January 2, 1967	Red Wing	Goodhue
64th		Charles G. Langley	Conservative	January 8, 1963	January 2, 1967	Red Wing	Goodhue
65th		George Conzemius	Liberal	January 3, 1967	January 1, 1973	Cannon Falls	Dakota Goodhue
66th		George Conzemius	Liberal	January 3, 1967	January 1, 1973	Cannon Falls	Dakota Goodhue
67th		George Conzemius	Liberal	January 3, 1967	January 1, 1973	Cannon Falls	Dakota Goodhue
68th		Tony Perpich	Liberal	January 2, 1973	January 3, 1977	Eveleth	Cook Lake St. Louis
69th		Tony Perpich	Liberal	January 2, 1973	January 3, 1977	Eveleth	Cook Lake St. Louis
70th		Doug Johnson	DFL	January 4, 1977	January 6, 2003	Cook	Cook Lake St. Louis
71st		Doug Johnson	DFL	January 4, 1977	January 6, 2003	Cook	Cook Koochiching Lake St. Louis
72nd		Doug Johnson	DFL	January 4, 1977	January 6, 2003	Cook	Cook Koochiching Lake St. Louis
73rd		Doug Johnson	DFL	January 4, 1977	January 6, 2003	Cook	Cook Koochiching Lake St. Louis
74th		Doug Johnson	DFL	January 4, 1977	January 6, 2003	Cook	Cook Koochiching Lake St. Louis
75th		Doug Johnson	DFL	January 4, 1977	January 6, 2003	Cook	Cook Koochiching Lake St. Louis
76th		Doug Johnson	DFL	January 4, 1977	January 6, 2003	Cook	Cook Koochiching Lake St. Louis
77th		Doug Johnson	DFL	January 4, 1977	January 6, 2003	Cook	Cook Koochiching Lake St. Louis
78th		Doug Johnson	DFL	January 4, 1977	January 6, 2003	Cook	Cook Koochiching Lake St. Louis
79th		Doug Johnson	DFL	January 4, 1977	January 6, 2003	Cook	Cook Koochiching Lake St. Louis
80th		Doug Johnson	DFL	January 4, 1977	January 6, 2003	Tower	Cook Koochiching Lake St. Louis
81st		Doug Johnson	DFL	January 4, 1977	January 6, 2003	Tower	Cook Koochiching Lake St. Louis
82nd		Doug Johnson	DFL	January 4, 1977	January 6, 2003	Tower	Cook Koochiching Lake St. Louis
83rd		Tom Bakk	DFL	January 7, 2003	January 7, 2013	Cook	Carlton Cook Lake St. Louis
84th		Tom Bakk	DFL	January 7, 2003	January 7, 2013	Cook	Carlton Cook Lake St. Louis
85th		Tom Bakk	DFL	January 7, 2003	January 7, 2013	Cook	Carlton Cook Lake St. Louis
86th		Tom Bakk	DFL	January 7, 2003	January 7, 2013	Cook	Carlton Cook Lake St. Louis
87th		Tom Bakk	DFL	January 7, 2003	January 7, 2013	Cook	Carlton Cook Lake St. Louis
88th		Dave Tomassoni	DFL	January 8, 2013	August 11, 2022	Chisholm	Itasca St. Louis
89th		Dave Tomassoni	DFL	January 8, 2013	August 11, 2022	Chisholm	Itasca St. Louis
90th		Dave Tomassoni	DFL	January 8, 2013	August 11, 2022	Chisholm	Itasca St. Louis
91st		Dave Tomassoni	Independent	January 8, 2013	August 11, 2022	Chisholm	Itasca St. Louis
92nd		Dave Tomassoni	Independent	January 8, 2013	August 11, 2022	Chisholm	Itasca St. Louis
93rd		Justin Eichorn	Republican	January 2, 2023	March 20, 2025	Grand Rapids	Cass Crow Wing Itasca
94th		Justin Eichorn	Republican	January 2, 2023	March 20, 2025	Grand Rapids	Cass Crow Wing Itasca
94th	Vacant		March 20, 2025	May 6, 2025			Cass Crow Wing Itasca
94th		Keri Heintzeman	Republican	May 6, 2025		Nisswa	Cass Crow Wing Itasca
