= Aaron Hudson =

Aaron Hudson may refer to:

- Aaron R. Hudson (died 1907), American soldier and recipient of the Medal of Honor
- Aaron C. Hudson (1822–1903), American businessman, educator, and politician
