= Minnesota North College – Vermilion =

Community college campus in Ely, Minnesota, U.S.

Minnesota North College - Vermilion
- Type: Public community college
- Established: 1922
- Parent institution: Minnesota State Colleges and Universities System
- Provost: Shawn Bina
- Students: 711
- Location: Ely, Minnesota, United States; 47.9055556°N 91.8388889°W
- Campus: 80 acres (32 ha)
- Colors: Blue & Gold
- Nickname: Ironhawks
- Sporting affiliations: Minnesota College Athletic Conference
- Website: www.minnesotanorth.edu/campuses/vermilion/

Minnesota North College – Vermilion (VCC), formerly known as Vermilion Community College (VCC), is a public community college campus in Ely, Minnesota, adjacent to the Boundary Waters Canoe Area Wilderness and the Superior National Forest. It offers several niche programs focusing on natural resources, natural sciences, and outdoor education. It offers residential housing to nearly half of all attending students. In 2022, the board of trustees of the Minnesota State Colleges and Universities merged the college with several others into a single institution, Minnesota North College.

== Campus ==
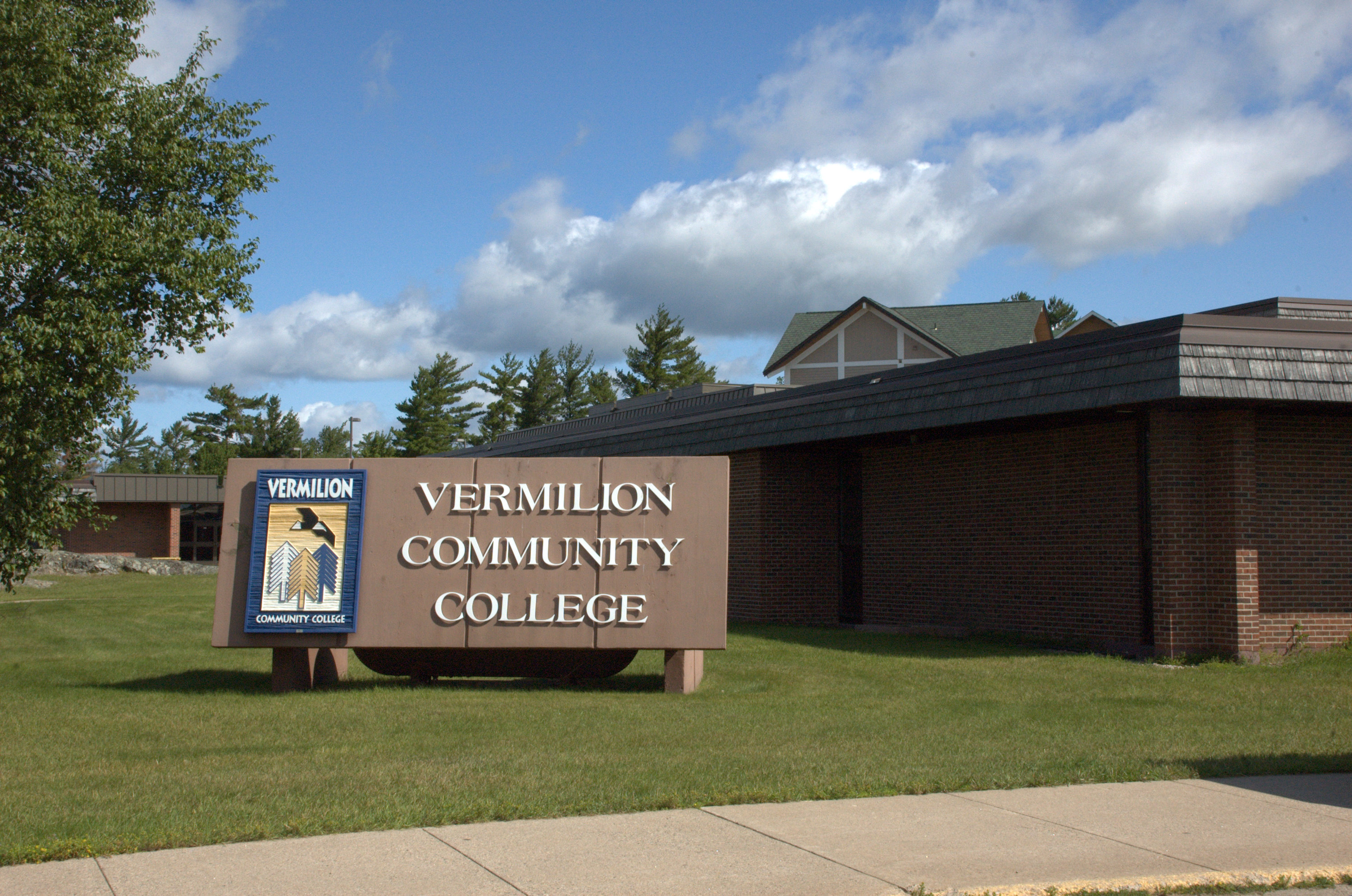

The campus sits on over 80 acres of property on Ely's outskirts and runs an offsite Outdoor Learning Center for student use. This center has cabins, a classroom, forest area, and a beach with docks on Fall Lake, an entry point into the Boundary Waters Canoe Area Wilderness (BWCAW).

In March 2022, the board of trustees of the Minnesota State Colleges and Universities system approved merger of the college with Hibbing Community College, Itasca Community College, Mesabi Range College, and Rainy River Community College into a single institution, Minnesota North College.

== Academics ==
Academic programs include law enforcement, natural resources, animal sciences, outdoor recreation, business, and liberal arts.

=== Law enforcement program ===
The law enforcement program offers a 19-credit certification program called Seasonal Park Law Enforcement Ranger Training, with an optional park ranger academy at the end.

=== Art program ===
In 2015, a kiln shelter was built on the campus for wood and soda firing of ceramics, as well as an area for a foundry.

The art department offers traditional art courses such as drawing, ceramics, and painting, as well as environmental design, wilderness digital photography, and introduction to video and the moving image.

=== Vet tech program ===
In 2017, the vet tech program launched. The program involves 75 credit hours.

== Housing ==
In August 2017, the campus unveiled a $6 million 120-bed townhouse-style dormitory that covers 26,000 square feet. Vermilion Community College accommodates over 60% of its students in its housing.
