= Minnesota Duluth Bulldogs =

Athletic teams of the University of Minnesota Duluth

- University: University of Minnesota Duluth
- Conference: Northern Sun Intercollegiate Conference
- NCAA: Division II most sports Division I Men's & women's ice hockey
- Athletic director: Forrest Karr
- Location: Duluth, Minnesota
- Varsity teams: 16 (7 men’s and 9 women’s)
- Football stadium: James S. Malosky Stadium (4,500)
- Basketball arena: Romano Gymnasium (2,759)
- Ice hockey arena: AMSOIL Arena (6,600)
- Baseball stadium: Bulldog Park
- Mascot: Champ
- Nickname: Bulldogs
- Fight song: UMD Rouser
- Colors: Maroon and gold
- Website: umdbulldogs.com

The Minnesota Duluth Bulldogs are the athletic teams that represent the University of Minnesota Duluth. They were first named Bulldogs in 1933. Their colors are maroon and gold. The school competes in the NCAA's Division II and the Northern Sun Intercollegiate Conference in all sports except ice hockey. The men's team competes in the National Collegiate Hockey Conference, and the women's hockey program compete in the Western Collegiate Hockey Association. Both hockey conferences are Division I. They are also known for having a strong club sports program, especially in ultimate frisbee, lacrosse, rugby, alpine skiing and ice hockey.

In 2008, the undefeated Bulldogs won the NCAA Division II National Football Championship—the first Division II championship in any sport at the school. On December 18, 2010, the Bulldogs won their second Division II national title in football. On April 9, 2011, the Bulldogs men's ice hockey program won its first NCAA Division I national championship, beating Michigan 3–2 in overtime. The Bulldog women's ice hockey program has won five NCAA Division I national titles.

== Intercollegiate programs ==
The UMD Bulldogs compete in the 16 following sports:

Men's sports	Women's sports
Baseball	Basketball
Basketball	Cross country
Cross country	Ice hockey
Football	Soccer
Ice hockey	Softball
Track & field^{1}	Tennis
	Track & field^{1}
	Volleyball
^{1} – includes both indoor and outdoor.

=== Men's ice hockey ===
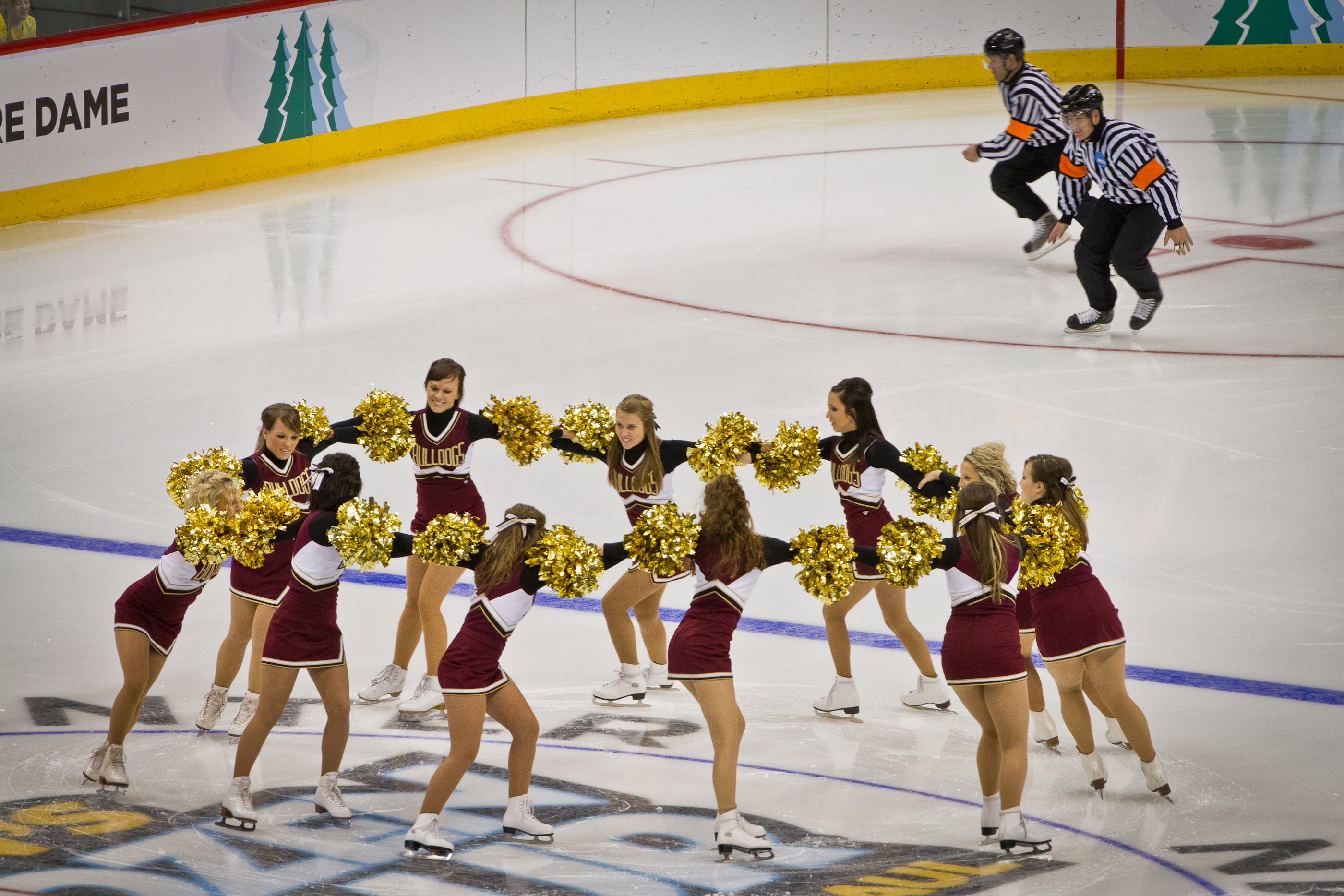
Bulldogs ice hockey cheerleaders

The Minnesota Duluth Bulldogs men's hockey program plays at the NCAA Division I level as a member of the National Collegiate Hockey Conference. The Bulldogs play off campus in downtown Duluth, Minnesota at the new AMSOIL Arena. The team has been successful with numerous Frozen Four appearances, including a 4-overtime loss to Bowling Green in the 1984 Championship game – the longest championship game in the NCAA tournament's history, and three championships in 2011, 2018, and 2019.

=== Women's ice hockey ===
The Minnesota–Duluth Bulldogs women's hockey team also plays at the NCAA Division I level as a member of the Western Collegiate Hockey Association. The women's program has been one of the top women's teams in the nation winning 5 NCAA DI ice hockey championships, including the 2010 championship.

=== Softball ===
Minnesota–Duluth's softball team appeared in two Women's College World Series in 1970 and 1971.

== Non-varsity sports clubs ==
=== Rugby ===
UMD has fielded a college rugby team since 1975. UMD plays in USA Rugby's Division II, and won three consecutive men's DII national championships from 2013-2015 in rugby union as well as a men's 7's national championship in Spring 2016. UM Duluth rugby offers limited scholarships to select players. UMD graduate Graham Harriman has played for the United States national rugby team.

=== Alpine skiing ===
UMD has produced an Alpine Ski team since the 1960s. UMD Alpine Ski teams (both men and women's) compete together in the U.S. Collegiate Ski and Snowboard Association (USCSA). The USCSA comprises over 170 Colleges and Universities competing in Alpine, Snowboard, Free-style & Cross-Country Skiing (Nordic). UMD Alpine has qualified a team to the USCSA National Championships every year since 2004 (Men's, women's or both). UMD Alpine is one of 2 colleges in its division to hold that distinction out of 20 colleges.

== Discontinued intercollegiate programs ==
UMD, at one time, also sponsored a number of other successful varsity programs such as men's tennis, men's golf, women's golf, wrestling, men's and women's swimming and diving, and men's and women's cross-country skiing.

== Facilities ==
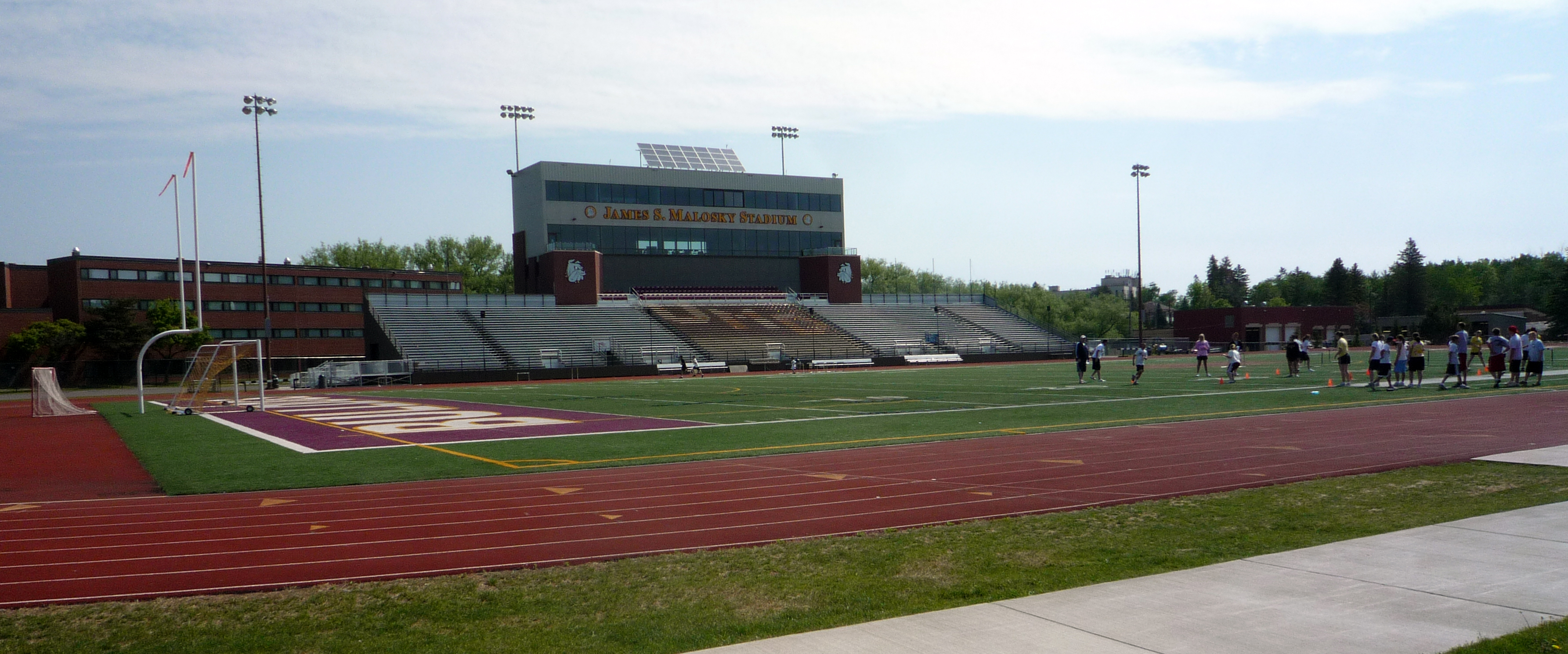
James S. Malosky Stadium

- Griggs Field at James S. Malosky Stadium: Football, Soccer, Softball, Track and Field
- AMSOIL Arena (2011) (off-campus): Hockey
- Romano Gymnasium: Basketball, Volleyball
- Bulldog Park/Wade Stadium: Baseball

== National championships ==
Sport	Competition	Div.	Titles	Winning years
Football	NCAA championship	II	2	2008, 2010
Men's ice hockey	NCAA championship	I	3	2011, 2018, 2019
Women's ice hockey	NCAA championship	I	5	2001, 2002, 2003, 2008, 2010
