= Hollandale =

Hollandale may refer to a location in the United States:

- Hollandale, Minnesota
- Hollandale, Mississippi
- Hollandale, Wisconsin
