= Dave Hancock (American politician) =

American politician

Member of the Minnesota House of Representatives
- In office January 6, 2015 – January 2, 2017
- Preceded by: Roger Erickson
- Succeeded by: Matt Grossell
- In office January 4, 2011 – January 7, 2013
- Preceded by: Brita Sailer
- Succeeded by: Roger Erickson (District 2A)
- Constituency: 2B (2011–2013); 2A (2015–2017)

Personal details
- Born: April 25, 1945 (age 81)
- Party: Republican
- Spouse: Pat
- Children: 2
- Education: Anderson University
- Occupation: small business owner

David A. Hancock (born April 25, 1945) is a Minnesota politician and former member of the Minnesota House of Representatives. A member of the Republican Party of Minnesota, he represented District 2A in northwestern Minnesota.

== Early life, education, and career ==
Hancock attended Anderson University in Anderson, Indiana, graduating with a Bachelor of Arts in History in 1968. He enlisted in the United States Army from 1969–1971, serving as an operating room technician and combat medic at Fort Sill near Lawton, Oklahoma. He also taught 8th grade American History and 9th grade Civics at Conrad Ball Junior High School in Loveland, Colorado from 1968–1969 and 1971–1972. He is general manager of Northwest Tire in Bemidji, and was the owner of R & D Tire and Automotive Center, also in Bemidji, from 1985–2008.

== Minnesota House of Representatives ==
Hancock was first elected to the House in 2010. He served on the Environment, Energy and Natural Resources Policy and Finance, the Government Operations and Elections, and the Higher Education Policy and Finance committees during the 2011–12 session. He did not seek re-election in 2016.
