= Earl L. Engbritson =

American politician (1908–1994)

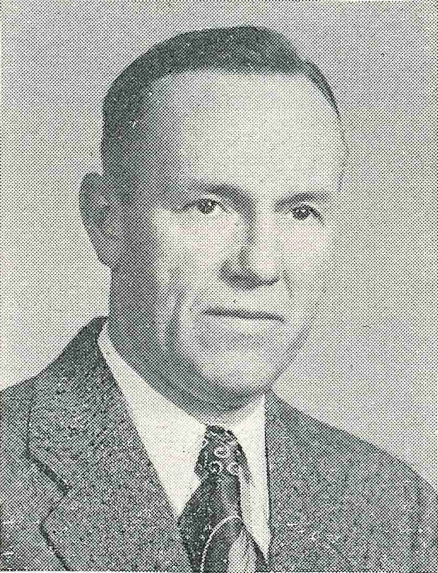

Member of the Minnesota Senate from the 6th district
- In office January 2, 1951 – January 3, 1955
- Preceded by: Helmer Myre
- Succeeded by: Rudolph William Hanson

Personal details
- Born: August 6, 1908 Jackson County, Minnesota, U.S.
- Died: May 3, 1994 (aged 85) Albert Lea, Minnesota, U.S.
- Resting place: Hollandale Cemetery, Hollandale, Minnesota, U.S.
- Spouse: Leona Hansen (m. 1935)
- Children: 2
- Education: Mankato State Teachers College
- Occupation: Politician, educator

Earl L. Engbritson (August 6, 1908 – May 3, 1994) was an American politician and educator who served in the Minnesota Senate from 1951 to 1955, representing the 6th legislative district of Minnesota in the 57th and 58th Minnesota Legislatures.

== Early life and education ==
Engbritson was born on a farm in Jackson County, Minnesota, on August 6, 1908. He graduated from Mankato State Teachers College (now Minnesota State University, Mankato) in 1928.

== Career ==
Prior to serving in the Minnesota Legislature, Engbritson served as principal of Shevlin Elementary School. He also served as superintendent for Hollandale Public Schools and Freeborn County Schools for 12 and five years, respectively.

Engbritson served in the Minnesota Senate from 1951 to 1955, representing the 6th legislative district of Minnesota in the 57th and 58th Minnesota Legislatures.

During his time in office, Engbritson served on the following committees:

- Agriculture
- Drainage
- Education
- Insurance
- Public Health
- Public Institutions and Buildings
- Towns and Counties

Engbritson's time in office began on January 2, 1951, and concluded on January 3, 1955. His district included representation for Freeborn County.

Engbritson was affiliated with the conservative caucus.

== Personal life and death ==
Engbritson married Leona Hansen in August 1935. They had two children together, a son and a daughter.

Engbritson resided in Hollandale, Minnesota. He was Congregational.

Engbritson died at the age of 85 at his home in Albert Lea, Minnesota, on May 3, 1994. His funeral and burial took place in Hollandale.

Minnesota Senate
Preceded by Helmer Myre	Member of the Minnesota Senate from the 6th district 1951–1955	Succeeded by Rudolph William Hanson
