= George Gilbert Wangensteen =

American politician (1926–1966)

George Gilbert Wangensteen (December 28, 1926 – June 3, 1966) was an American lawyer and politician.

Wangensteen was born in Minnesota and graduated from the Itasca Community College. He served in the United States Army during World War II. Wangensteen received his law degree from the University of Minnesota Law School and practiced law in Bovey, Minnesota. He served as the Assistant Minnesota Secretary of State and on the Itasca County Independent School District No. 2 Board. Wangensteen served in the Minnesota House of Representatives from 1959 to 1962.
