= George Conzemius =

American politician and educator

George Robert Conzemius

Member of the Minnesota Senate from the 25th district
- In office January 2, 1973 – January 3, 1977

Member of the Minnesota Senate from the 6th district
- In office January 3, 1967 – January 1, 1973
- Preceded by: Charles G. Langley
- Succeeded by: Tony Perpich

Personal details
- Born: July 23, 1936 (age 90) Hastings, Minnesota
- Died: 26 October 2017 Cannon Falls, Minnesota
- Party: DFL
- Profession: Coach and Science Teacher

George Robert Conzemius (July 23, 1936 – October 26, 2017) was an American politician, educator, farmer, and writer.

Conzemius was born in Hastings, Minnesota and graduated from Hastings High School in 1954. He served in the United States Army. Conzemius received his bachelor's degree from University of Minnesota in 1959. He taught science at Cannon Falls High School in Cannon Falls, Minnesota. Conzemius served on the Cannon Falls City Council in 1965 and 1966 and was a Democrat. Conzemius served in the Minnesota Senate from 1967 to 1977. Conzemius died in Cannon Falls, Minnesota.
