= Rita Albrecht =

American public servant and politician

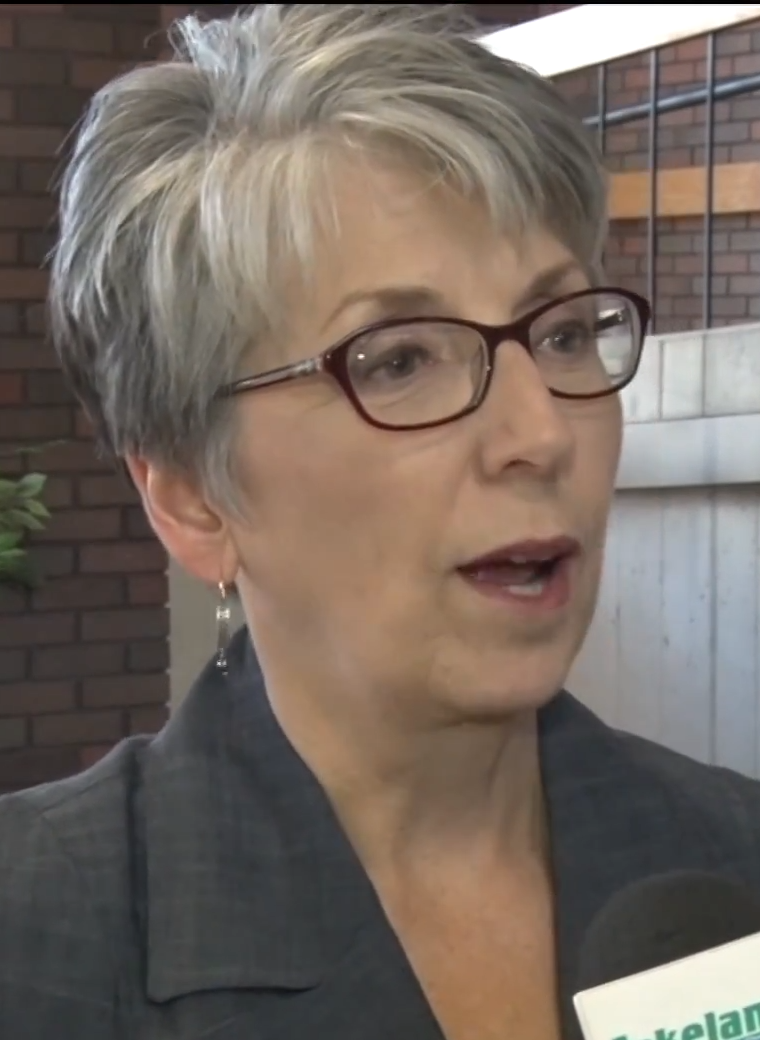
- Albrecht in 2016
- Born: c. 1955
- Education: Bemidji State University
- Political party: Democratic

Rita Albrecht (born c. 1955) is an American public servant and former politician who was the mayor of Bemidji, Minnesota from 2012 to 2020. She was appointed to the Legislative-Citizen Commission on Minnesota Resources by governor Tim Walz in 2021.

== Life ==
Albrecht was born c. 1955 and was raised in Big Falls, Minnesota. She attended Little-fork-Big Falls K-12 school where her father was the elementary school principal. Her mother worked for Boise Cascade. Albrecht earned degrees in geography and education from Bemidji State University in 2001.

Albrecht worked as a community planner before working as the northwest regional director in the Minnesota Department of Natural Resources until 2019. In 2010, she was elected to the city council of Bemidji, Minnesota. She served as its mayor from 2012 to 2020. In 2021, Albrecht was received the Jack Murray Award from Coalition of Greater Minnesota Cities for her service.

During the 2020 Minnesota Senate election, Albrecht was the Minnesota Democratic–Farmer–Labor Party's nominee for the fifth district. Her campaign emphasized addressing local issues like education and enhancing the quality of life in the district through effective policy-making and community engagement. She lost in the general election to incumbent Republican Justin Eichorn. On April 5, 2021, Albrecht joined the Legislative-Citizen Commission on Minnesota Resources, having been appointed by governor Tim Walz. Her term expires December 31, 2024. In 2022, Albrecht replaced C.T. Marhula on the Bemidji Charter Commission.
