= Hastings High School (Minnesota) =

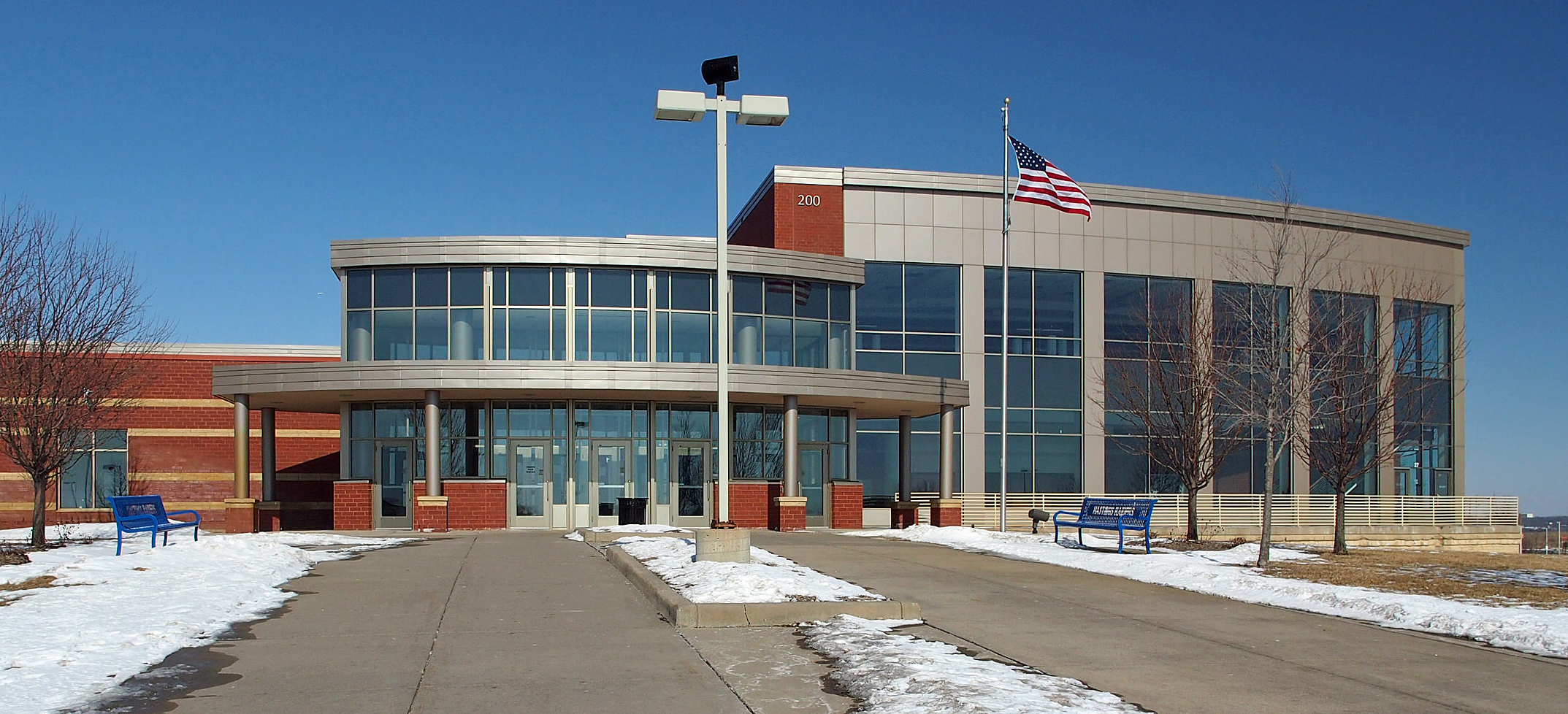
- Hastings High School's main entrance

Location
- 200 General Sieben Drive; Hastings, Minnesota 55033; United States; 44°44′39″N 92°53′27″W

Information
- School type: Public, high school
- Founded: 1866
- School district: Independent School District 200
- Superintendent: Kristine Wehrkamp Herman
- Principal: Scott Doran
- Teaching staff: 64.48 (FTE)
- Grades: 9–12
- Student to teacher ratio: 20.18
- Hours in school day: 7
- Campus type: Suburban
- Colors: Royal blue and gold
- Athletics conference: Metro East
- Mascot: Raider
- Team name: Raiders
- Yearbook: Spiral
- Feeder schools: Hastings Middle School
- Website: hs.hastings.k12.mn.us

Hastings High School is one of the oldest operating public high schools in the U.S. state of Minnesota. It is in Hastings, and is part of Independent School District 200.

== About ==
The first high school in Hastings was constructed in 1866. As Hastings expanded, a high school was built in Schoolhouse Square, where it stayed for most of the 20th century. In 2001, a modern, larger high school was built on Hastings's western edge. Its construction centered on a bridge connecting the athletic facilities to the classrooms.

Hastings High School enrolls about 1,300 students in grades 9–12 and has a graduation rate of 97%. It occupies over 100 acres near the Mississippi River.

== Communities served by Hastings Public Schools (ISD 200) ==
- Cities:
  - Hastings (pop. 22,424)
  - Hampton (pop. 689)
  - Miesville (pop. 125)
  - New Trier (pop. 112)
  - Vermillion (pop. 419)
- Townships:
  - Denmark (pop. 1,348)
  - Douglas (pop. 760)
  - Hampton Township (pop. 968)
  - Marshan (pop. 1,263)
  - Nininger (pop. 865)
  - Ravenna (2,336)
  - Vermillion Township (pop. 1,243)

== Curriculum ==
Through the Minnesota state Post Secondary Enrollment Options (PSEO) program, students are eligible to take classes at state colleges and universities. The school also offers Advanced Placement (AP) courses via the College Board.

== Athletics ==
=== State championships ===
Season	Sport	Number of championships	Year
Fall	Adapted floor hockey (CI)	3	2006, 2009, 2015
Fall	Adapted floor hockey (PI)	3	2004, 2005, 2006
Fall	Adapted soccer (CI)	2	2007, 2012
Fall	Adapted soccer (PI)	6	1993, 1997, 2001, 2003, 2004, 2006
Fall	Football, boys'	5	1937^^, 1938^^, 1939^^, 1949^, 2001
Fall	Marching band	9	2010, 2011, 2012, 2013, 2014, 2017, 2019, 2022, 2023
Fall	Swimming and diving, girls'	2	1989, 1995
Winter	Nordic skiing, boys'	1	1989
Winter	Nordic skiing, girls'	1	1992
Winter	Alpine skiing, boys'	1	1988
Winter	Basketball, girls'	1	1996
Winter	Wrestling, boys '	2	1996, 2023
Spring	Adapted softball (PI)	2	2006, 2008
Spring	Softball, girls'	1	2011
Spring	Golf, boys'	1	1986
Spring	Baseball, boys'	2	1967, 1999
Spring	Track & Field, boys'	1	2025
Total:		43	

^^ = Indicates the Mississippi Valley State Champions. ^ = Pre-Minnesota State High School League.

On June 21, 2025, the Hastings Raiders boys' track and field team won the national championship in the 4x200 relay at the Nike Outdoor Nationals with a time of 1:26.22.

== Notable alumni ==
- Jackie Biskupski, politician
- George Conzemius, Minnesota state senator and educator
- Mark Doten, novelist
- Aaron Fox (ice hockey), professional ice hockey player
- Mark Steven Johnson, filmmaker
- Craig Kilborn, original host of The Daily Show, former anchor on ESPN's SportsCenter, and former host of CBS's The Late Late Show
- Larry LaCoursiere, professional boxer
- Derek Stepan, professional ice hockey player for the Carolina Hurricanes
- Jeff Taffe, professional ice hockey player
- Dean Talafous, professional ice hockey player
- Ben Utecht, former NFL tight end; singer
