= Minnesota North College – Mesabi Range Virginia =

Community college in Virginia, Minnesota, US

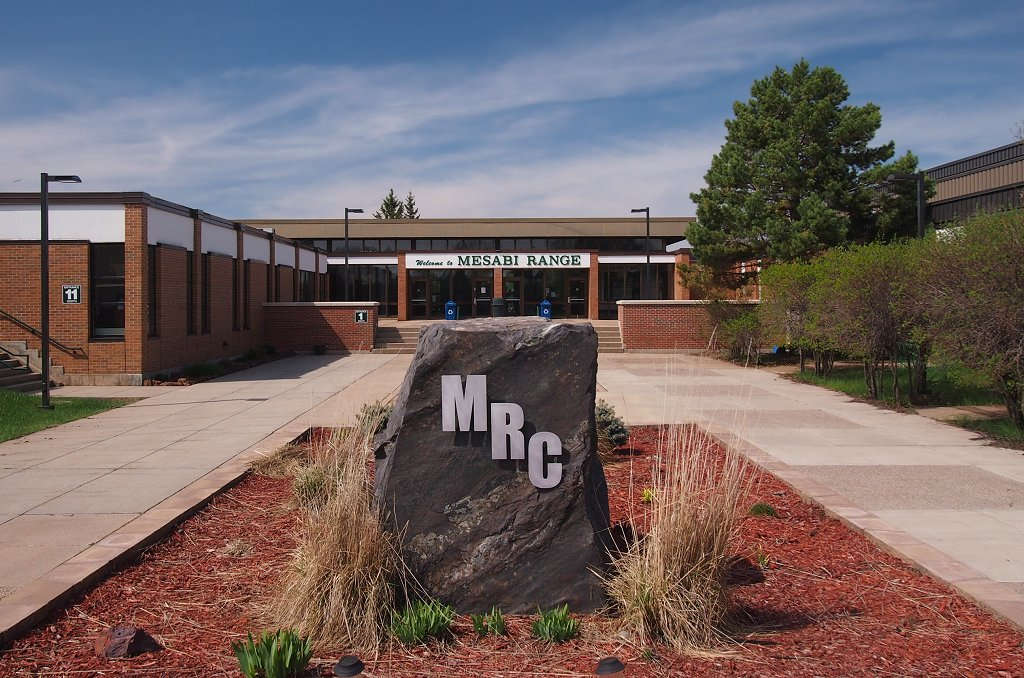
- Main entrance of Minnesota North College – Mesabi Range Virginia
- Motto: Lead The Way
- Type: Public community college
- Established: 1925
- Parent institution: Minnesota State Colleges and Universities System
- Provost: Shelly McCauley Jugovich
- Students: 1,700
- Location: Virginia, Minnesota, U.S. 47.4711°N 92.5247°W
- Colors: Gold and green
- Nickname: Norse
- Sporting affiliations: NJCAA, Minnesota College Athletic Conference
- Mascot: Norsemen
- Website: minnesotanorth.edu/campuses/mesabi-range-virginia/

Minnesota North College – Mesabi Range Virginia, most recently known as Mesabi Range College (MRC) Virginia campus, which was formerly known as Mesabi Range Community and Technical College) is a public community college campus located in Virginia, Minnesota. In 2022, the board of trustees of the Minnesota State Colleges and Universities merged the college with several others into a single institution called Minnesota North College.

== History ==
The college traced its roots to 1923 when Virginia Junior College came into existence. When the new campus was built across from the lake on the corner of W. Chestnut and N 9th, in the current location, the name was changed to Mesabi State Junior College then to Mesabi Range Community and Technical College. Its name changed again, in January 2014, to Mesabi Range College. It is named for the Mesabi Range, an iron-ore deposit in Minnesota's Iron Range where the campus and Minnesota North College – Mesabi Range Eveleth are located.

In 2022, the Board of Trustees of the Minnesota State Colleges and Universities merged Hibbing Community College with Itasca Community College, Mesabi Range College, Rainy River Community College, and Vermilion Community College into a single institution called Minnesota North College.

== Athletics ==
As part of Minnesota North College, a member of the Minnesota College Athletic Conference (MCAC) within the National Junior College Athletic Association (NJCAA), Norse athletics include baseball, softball, football, men's basketball, women's basketball, and volleyball.

== Notable alumni ==
- Myron Bright, United States federal appellate judge (A.A., 1939)
- Douglas Johnson, Minnesota state legislator and educator
- Stan Mikawos, a Canadian football player
- Khiry Robinson, an American football player
