= Minnesota North College – Hibbing =

Community college in Hibbing, Minnesota, U.S.

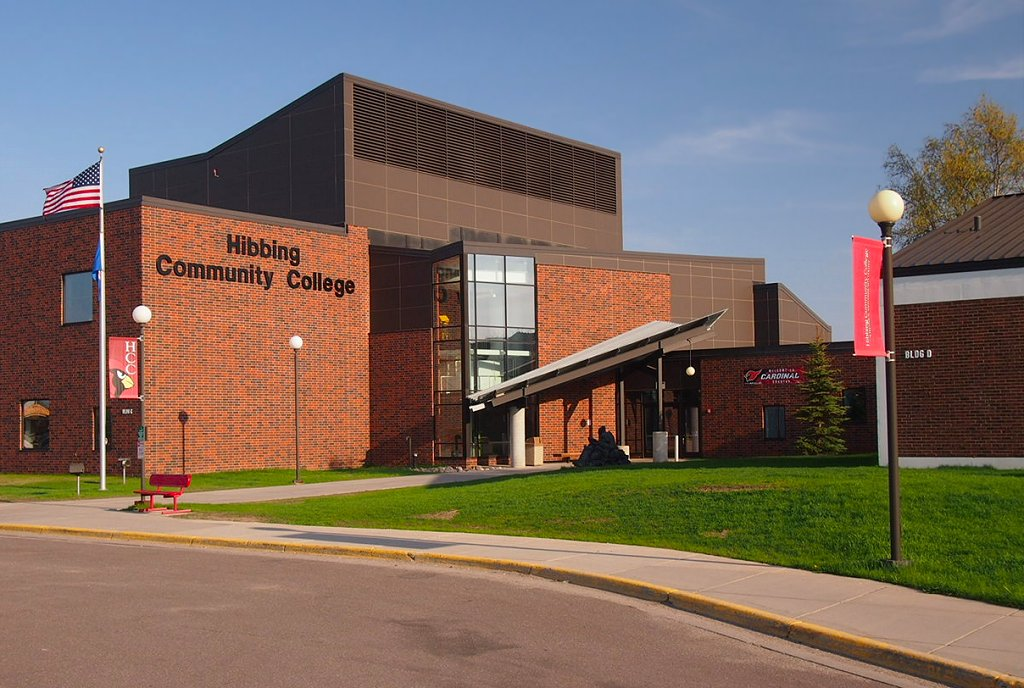
- Main entrance of Hibbing Community College
- Type: Public community college
- Active: 1916–2022
- Parent institution: Minnesota North College
- President: Mike Raich
- Provost: Aaron Reini
- Students: 700
- Location: Hibbing, Minnesota, U.S. 47.4213°N 92.9219°W
- Colors: Cardinal & white
- Nickname: Cardinal
- Sporting affiliations: NJCAA, Minnesota College Athletic Conference
- Website: www.hibbing.edu

Minnesota North College – Hibbing, formerly Hibbing Community College, is a public community college campus in Hibbing, Minnesota. In 2022, the board of trustees of the Minnesota State Colleges and Universities merged the college with several others into a single institution called Minnesota North College.

== History ==
The campus was founded in 1916 and has undergone several transformations. Originally housed in the historic Hibbing High School, it moved into its own campus in 1969. In the 1990s, Hibbing Community College and Hibbing Technical College merged to form a comprehensive institution. In 2001 a new building integration/co-location project was completed and the entire school now exists at one location.

In 2022, the board of trustees of the Minnesota State Colleges and Universities merged Hibbing Community College with Itasca Community College, Mesabi Range College, Rainy River Community College, and Vermilion Community College into a single institution called Minnesota North College.

== Athletics ==
As part of Minnesota North College, a member of the Minnesota College Athletic Conference (MCAC) National Junior College Athletic Association (NJCAA), Cardinal Athletics include Baseball, Softball, Men's Basketball, Women's Basketball, Volleyball, and Trap League.
