= Justin Eichorn =

American politician and child sex offender (born 1984)

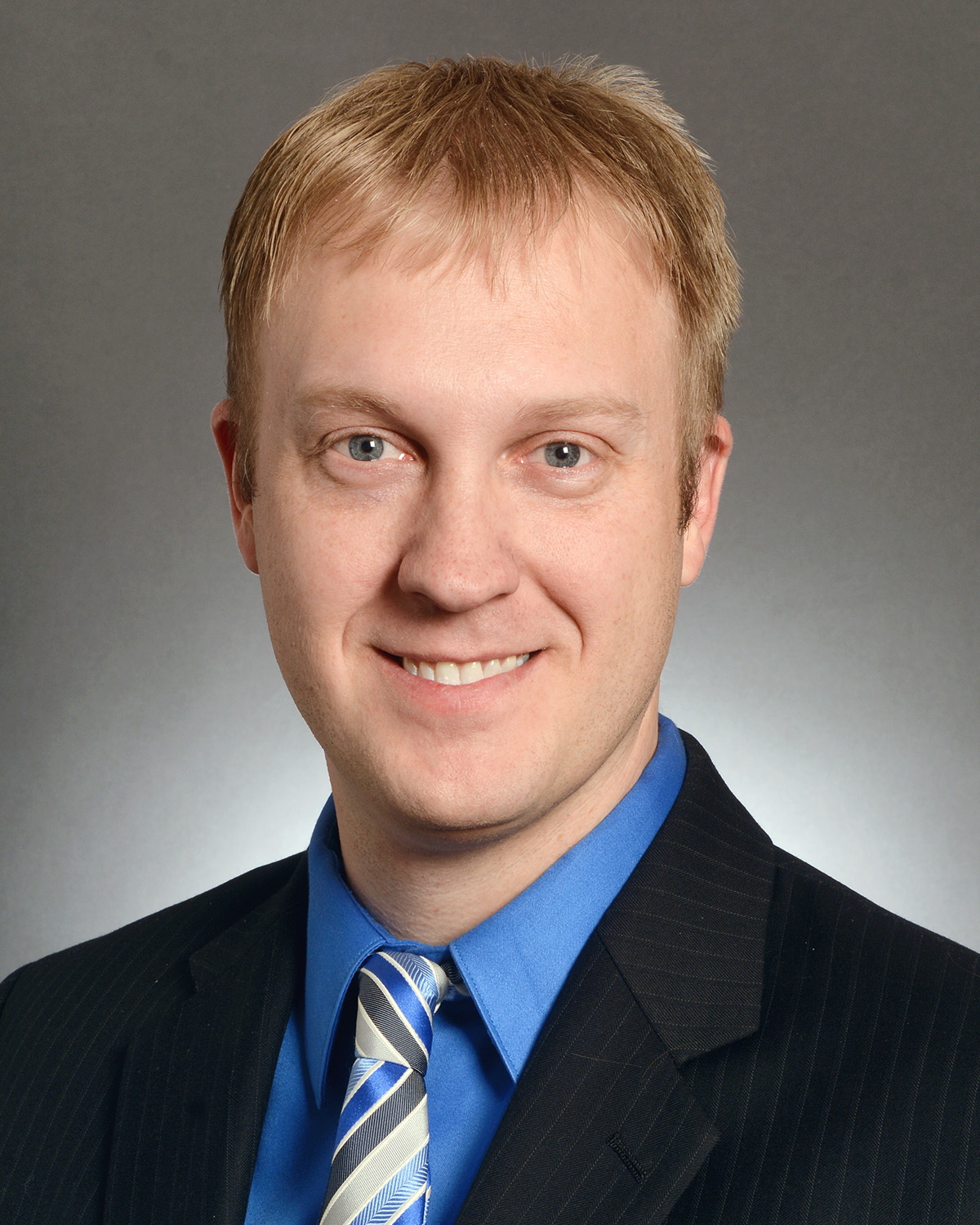

Member of the Minnesota Senate
- In office January 3, 2017 – March 20, 2025
- Preceded by: Tom Saxhaug
- Succeeded by: Keri Heintzeman
- Constituency: 5th district (2017–2023); 6th district (2023–2025)

Personal details
- Born: May 7, 1984 (age 42)
- Party: Republican
- Spouse: Brittany (filed for divorce)
- Children: 4
- Education: Itasca Community College; Concordia University St. Paul

Justin David Eichorn (born May 7, 1984) is an American former politician and child sex offender who served as a member of the Minnesota Senate from 2017 to 2025. A member of the Republican Party of Minnesota, he represented District 5 from 2017 to 2023 and District 6 from 2023 until his resignation in 2025.

On March 17, 2025, Eichorn was arrested during a sting operation on suspicion of soliciting a minor for sex. On March 20, he was charged in federal court and resigned from the Senate as Republicans and Democrats prepared to expel him. In May 2026, he pleaded guilty to attempted possession of child sexual abuse material.

== Education and early career ==
Eichorn attended Itasca Community College and Concordia University St. Paul. He served on the Grand Rapids Housing and Redevelopment Authority.

Eichorn has worked at his family's outdoor store in Grand Rapids, where he later started a small business.

== Political career ==
Eichorn ran for the Minnesota House of Representatives in District 5B in 2014, losing to incumbent Tom Anzelc. He was elected to the Minnesota Senate in 2016 from District 5, narrowly defeating incumbent Tom Saxhaug by 553 votes. He was reelected in 2020, but opted to run in District 6 in 2022, where he won by nearly 30 points.

On March 17, 2025, Eichorn was one of five Republican authors of a bill, SF2589, that would designate "Trump derangement syndrome" as an officially recognized mental illness in Minnesota.

=== Arrest and resignation ===
On March 17, 2025, during a sting operation, Eichorn was arrested in Bloomington, Minnesota, on suspicion of soliciting a minor for sex. The arrest occurred after he allegedly sexually solicited a detective posing as a minor. His fellow Republican legislators, as well as Minnesota GOP chair Alex Plechash, called on him to resign. On March 20, Eichorn submitted his letter of resignation, effective immediately.

In an April 29 special election, Keri Heintzeman was elected to the Senate seat Eichorn vacated.

=== Charges and trial ===
On March 20, 2025, Eichorn was charged in federal court for attempted coercion and enticement of a minor. After appearing in court, he was released on his own recognizance pending placement in a halfway house. On March 23, prosecutors asked a judge to return Eichorn to jail after he prevented investigators from examining one of his laptops.

On April 21, Eichorn pleaded not guilty at his federal arraignment hearing. He is set to stand trial on June 1, 2026.

In May 2026, Eichorn pleaded guilty to the lesser charge of attempted possession of child sexual abuse material.

On September 23, 2026, Eichorn was sentenced to 16 months in prison, with credit for five months already served, followed by five years of supervised release. Prosecutors had sought a five-year sentence, but the judge ruled within the 15-to-21-month sentencing guideline range agreed to by both sides.

== Personal life ==
Eichorn and his wife, Brittany, have four children and reside in Grand Rapids. A week after his arrest, his wife filed for divorce.

== Electoral history ==
2014 Minnesota House of Representatives district 5B election
Party	Candidate	Votes	%
Democratic (DFL)	Tom Anzelc (incumbent)	9,449	56.54
Republican	Justin Eichorn	7,241	43.33
Write-in		23	0.14
Total votes		16,713	100%

2016 Minnesota Senate district 5 election
Party	Candidate	Votes	%
Republican	Justin Eichorn	20,240	50.59
Democratic (DFL)	Tom Saxhaug (incumbent)	19,687	49.21
Write-in		83	0.21
Total votes		40,010	100%
Republican gain from Democratic (DFL)			

2020 Minnesota Senate district 5 election
Party	Candidate	Votes	%
Republican	Justin Eichorn (incumbent)	25,169	55.59
Democratic (DFL)	Rita Albrecht	16,706	36.89
Legal Marijuana Now	Robyn Smith	2,400	5.30
Grassroots—LC	Dennis Barsness	967	2.14
Write-in		38	0.08
Total votes		45,280	100%

2022 Minnesota Senate district 6 election
Party	Candidate	Votes	%
Republican	Justin Eichorn (incumbent)	26,218	63.50
Democratic (DFL)	Steve Samuelson	15,045	36.44
Write-in		26	0.06
Total votes		41,289	100%

== See also ==
- 2025 Minnesota Senate District 6 special election
