= Minnesota North College =

Collection of colleges in the iron range of northern Minnesota, United States

- Type: Public community college
- Established: 2022-05-23
- Parent institution: Minnesota State Colleges and Universities system
- President: Michael Raich
- Location: Ely, Eveleth, Grand Rapids, Hibbing, International Falls, Virginia, Minnesota, United States
- Website: minnesotanorth.edu

Minnesota North College is a public community college with six campuses in northeast Minnesota: Hibbing campus, Itasca Campus (Grand Rapids), Mesabi Range - Eveleth, Mesabi Range - Virginia, Vermilion (Ely) and Rainy River (International Falls). It is a member of the Minnesota State Colleges and Universities system and was formed in 2022 by merging five independent community colleges: Hibbing Community College, Itasca Community College, Mesabi Range College, Vermilion Community College, and Rainy River Community College.

== See also ==
- List of colleges and universities in Minnesota
- Higher education in Minnesota
