= Roger Erickson (politician) =

American politician

Member of the Minnesota House of Representatives from the 2A district
- In office January 8, 2013 – January 5, 2015
- Preceded by: Dave Hancock
- Succeeded by: Dave Hancock

Personal details
- Born: December 22, 1953 (age 72)
- Party: Minnesota Democratic–Farmer–Labor Party
- Spouse: Carol
- Children: 2
- Education: Northland Community & Technical College; Bemidji State University

Roger A. Erickson (born December 22, 1953) is a Minnesota politician from Baudette, Minnesota, and former member of the Minnesota House of Representatives. A member of the Minnesota Democratic–Farmer–Labor Party, he represented District 2A, which included Lake of the Woods and parts of Beltrami, Clearwater and Hubbard counties in northwestern Minnesota.

== Early life, education, and career ==
Erickson graduated from Roseau High School. He attended Northland Community & Technical College, graduating with an Associate of Arts, and Bemidji State University, graduating with a Bachelor of Science in elementary education. He is a retired teacher.

== Minnesota House of Representatives ==
Erickson was first elected to the House in 2012, winning election in the redrawn district. He served on the Agriculture Policy, Education Policy, and the Environment, Natural Resources, and Agriculture Finance Committees. He lost re-election in 2014 to Republican Dave Hancock. He unsuccessfully sought the DFL endorsement for election to the same seat in 2016, losing to Jerry Loud.

== Personal life ==
Erickson is married to Carol, with whom he has two children.

Minnesota House of Representatives
Preceded by Dave Hancock (District 2B)	Member of the House of Representatives for District 2A; 2013–2015	Succeeded by Dave Hancock
