= Aaron C. Hudson =

American businessman and politician (1822–1903)

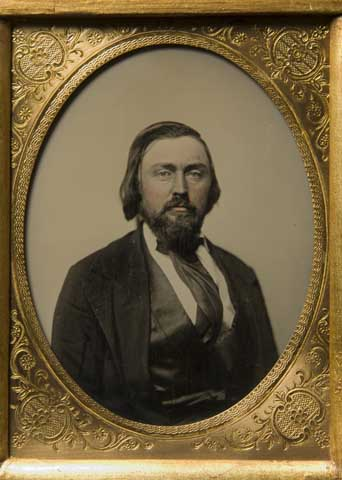
- Hudson c. 1858

Member of the Minnesota Senate from the 6th District
- In office December 2, 1857 – December 6, 1859
- Preceded by: Position established
- Succeeded by: Robert Neil MacLaren

Superintendent of Wabasha County, Minnesota Schools
- In office 1874–1878

Personal details
- Born: July 26, 1822 Danube, New York, U.S.
- Died: July 7, 1903 (aged 80) Lake City, Minnesota, U.S.
- Other political affiliations: Republican

Aaron C. Hudson (July 26, 1822 – July 7, 1903), also known as Aaron G. Hudson, was an American businessman, educator, and politician. Hudson was an early citizen of Goodhue County, Minnesota.

== Early life and career ==
Hudson was born on July 26, 1822 in Danube, New York. From 1831 to 1844 Hudson lived in Calhoun County, Michigan.

== Politics ==
While living in Battle Creek, Michigan in Calhoun County, Hudson was elected as the justice of the peace. Hudson later moved to Minnesota Territory and settled in Florence, Minnesota in Goodhue County. While living in Goodhue County, Hudson was a nominee for the office of register of deeds, he was defeated by Charles Carroll Webster of Zumbrota, Minnesota. Hudson was elected as a representative of the Republican Constitutional Conventional which helped ratify the Minnesota Constitution from July 13, 1857 to August 29, 1857. During the convention Hudson represented Minnesota's 4th Council District alongside Charles McClure, George Watson, Frank Mantor, and Joseph Peckham.^{:44} Hudson was later elected on October 13, 1857 to the Minnesota Senate as a representative of Minnesota's 6th Senate district.^{:60} Hudson would serve during the 1st Minnesota Legislature in the senate from December 2, 1857 to December 6, 1859. During his term Hudson was a member of the Militia Committee. Hudson was a member of the Republican Party of Minnesota.^{:60}

== Later life ==
Following his political career Hudson served as the superintendent of schools for Wabasha County, Minnesota from 1874 to 1878.^{:44} In 1889 Hudson moved to Lake City, Minnesota with his family and lived on a farm.

Hudson died on July 7, 1903 in Lake City.

== Personal life ==
Hudson was married to Hannah Southerland on March 15, 1847.
