= Minnesota North College – Mesabi Range Eveleth =

Community college campus in Minnesota, U.S.

- Type: Public community college
- Parent institution: Minnesota State Colleges and Universities System
- Location: Eveleth, United States; 47.4715237767432°N 92.5251739306842°W
- Nickname: Norse
- Sporting affiliations: NJCAA, Minnesota College Athletic Conference
- Mascot: Norsemen
- Website: minnesotanorth.edu/campuses/mesabi-range-eveleth/

Minnesota North College – Mesabi Range Eveleth, most recently known as Mesabi Range College (MRC) Eveleth campus, which was formerly known as Mesabi Range Community and Technical College) is a public community college campus located in Eveleth, Minnesota. In 2022, the board of trustees of the Minnesota State Colleges and Universities merged the college with Minnesota North College – Mesabi Range Virginia and several others into a single institution called Minnesota North College.

== History ==
The school was founded as Eveleth Junior College in 1918.

The campus is named for the Mesabi Range, an iron-ore deposit in Minnesota's Iron Range where the campus and Minnesota North College – Mesabi Range Virginia are located.

== Athletics ==
As part of Minnesota North College, a member of the Minnesota College Athletic Conference (MCAC) National Junior College Athletic Association (NJCAA), Norse Athletics include baseball, softball, football, men's basketball, women's basketball, and volleyball.
