= Hollandale, Minnesota =

City in Minnesota, United States

Hollandale
- City
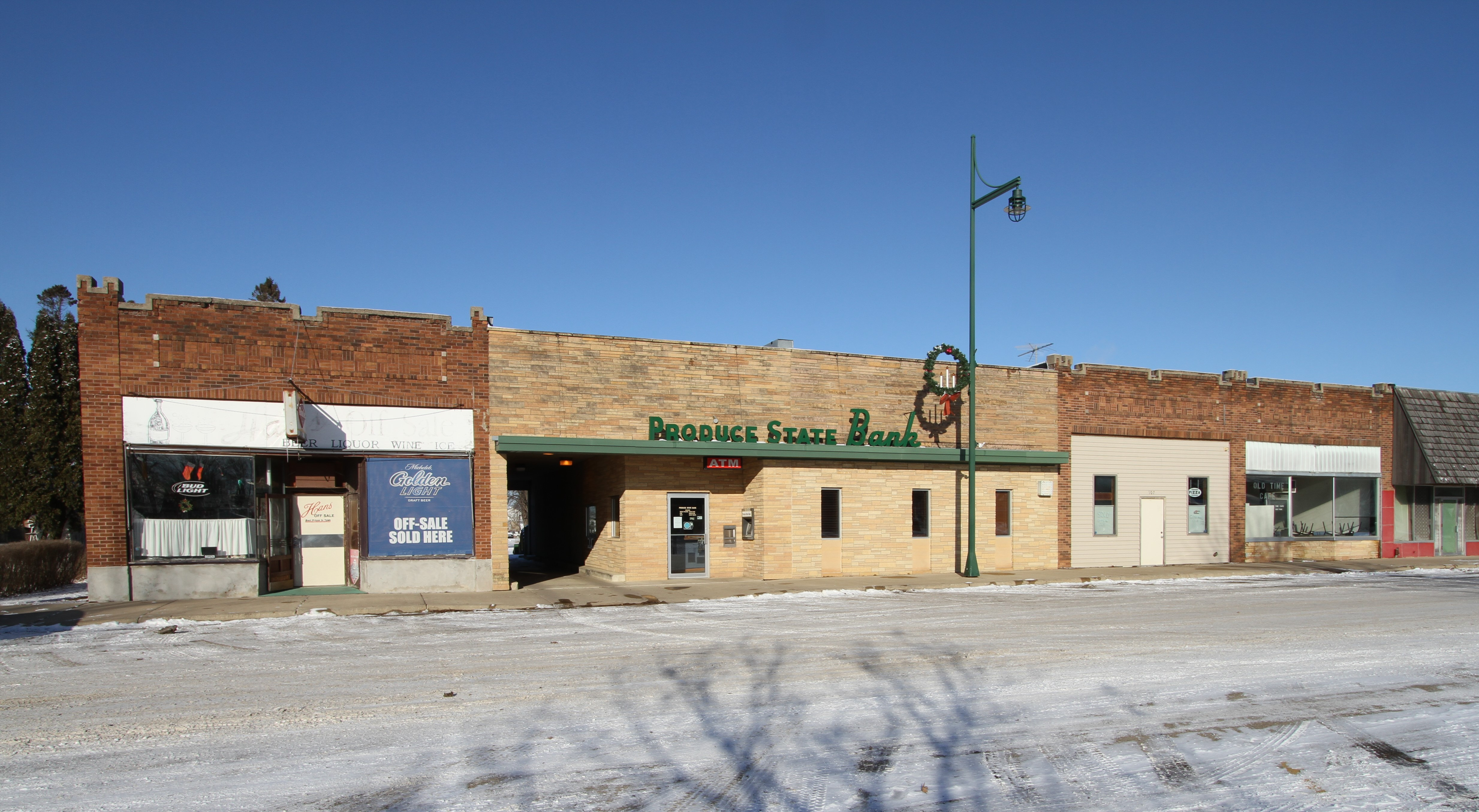

- Location of Hollandale, Minnesota
- Coordinates: 43°45′35″N 93°12′16″W
- Country: United States
- State: Minnesota
- County: Freeborn

Area
  - Total: 0.44 sq mi (1.14 km^{2})
  - Land: 0.44 sq mi (1.14 km^{2})
  - Water: 0 sq mi (0.00 km^{2})
- Elevation: 1,207 ft (368 m)

Population (2020)
  - Total: 308
  - Density: 699.3/sq mi (270.01/km^{2})
- Time zone: UTC-6 (Central (CST))
  - Summer (DST): UTC-5 (CDT)
- ZIP code: 56045
- Area code: 507
- FIPS code: 27-29636
- GNIS feature ID: 2394402
- Website: https://cityofhollandale.com/

Hollandale is a city on State Highway 251 in Freeborn County, Minnesota, United States. As of the 2020 census, Hollandale had a population of 308.

== Geography ==
According to the United States Census Bureau, the city has an area of 0.44 square miles (1.14 km^{2}), all land.

== Demographics ==
Historical population
Census	Pop.	Note	%±
1940	219		—
1950	360		64.4%
1960	363		0.8%
1970	287		−20.9%
1980	290		1.0%
1990	289		−0.3%
2000	292		1.0%
2010	303		3.8%
2020	308		1.7%
U.S. Decennial Census

=== 2010 census ===
As of the census of 2010, there were 303 people, 128 households, and 81 families living in the city. The population density was 688.6 inhabitants per square mile (265.9/km^{2}). There were 146 housing units at an average density of 331.8 per square mile (128.1/km^{2}). The racial makeup of the city was 96.4% White, 2.6% from other races, and 1.0% from two or more races. Hispanic or Latino of any race were 9.6% of the population.

There were 128 households, of which 31.3% had children under the age of 18 living with them, 46.9% were married couples living together, 7.8% had a female householder with no husband present, 8.6% had a male householder with no wife present, and 36.7% were non-families. 30.5% of all households were made up of individuals, and 17.9% had someone living alone who was 65 years of age or older. The average household size was 2.37 and the average family size was 2.91.

The median age in the city was 38.8 years. 26.7% of residents were under the age of 18; 9.4% were between the ages of 18 and 24; 21.5% were from 25 to 44; 25.4% were from 45 to 64; and 17.2% were 65 years of age or older. The gender makeup of the city was 53.1% male and 46.9% female.

=== 2000 census ===
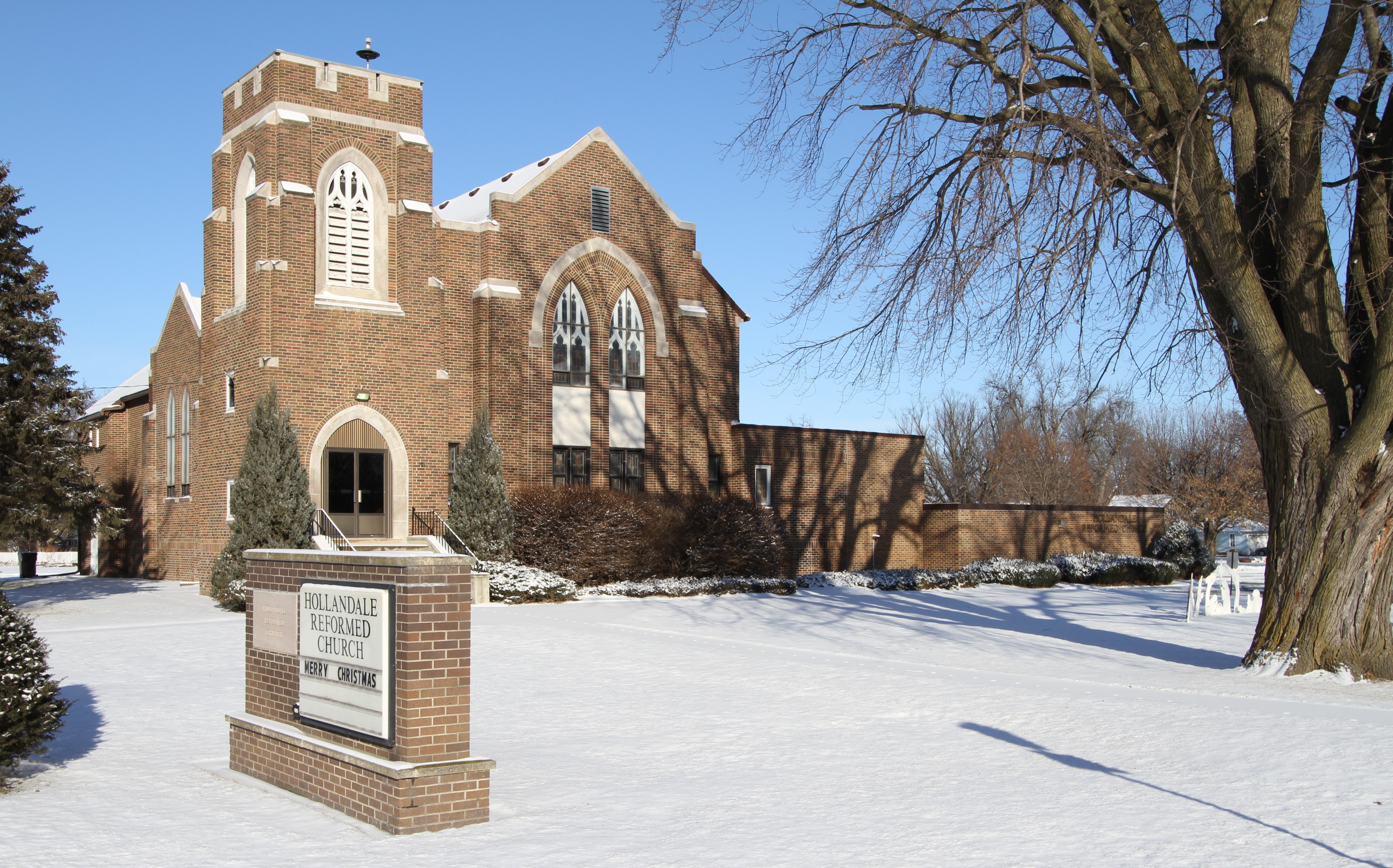
Hollandale Reformed Church

As of the census of 2000, there were 292 people, 131 households, and 88 families living in the city. The population density was 677.0 inhabitants per square mile (261.4/km^{2}). There were 137 housing units at an average density of 317.6 per square mile (122.6/km^{2}). The racial makeup of the city was 95.55% White, 4.45% from other races. Hispanic or Latino of any race were 8.22% of the population.

There were 131 households, out of which 25.2% had children under the age of 18 living with them, 55.0% were married couples living together, 6.1% had a female householder with no husband present, and 32.8% were non-families. 32.1% of all households were made up of individuals, and 16.0% had someone living alone who was 65 years of age or older. The average household size was 2.23 and the average family size was 2.73.

In the city, the population was spread out, with 22.9% under the age of 18, 5.8% from 18 to 24, 25.3% from 25 to 44, 19.5% from 45 to 64, and 26.4% who were 65 years of age or older. The median age was 42 years. For every 100 females, there were 86.0 males. For every 100 females age 18 and over, there were 89.1 males.

The median income for a household in the city was $26,250, and the median income for a family was $41,875. Males had a median income of $33,214 versus $20,313 for females. The per capita income for the city was $15,972. About 11.8% of families and 15.2% of the population were below the poverty line, including 28.9% of those under the age of eighteen and 4.7% of those 65 or over.

== Notable people ==
- Earl L. Engbritson, educator and Minnesota state senator
- Charlie Parr, country blues musician
