= Minnesota North College – Itasca =

Community college campus in Grand Rapids, Minnesota, U.S.

- Motto: Best Place to Start
- Type: Public community college
- Established: 1922
- Parent institution: Minnesota State Colleges and Universities System
- President: Michael Raich (interim)
- Provost: Bart Johnson
- Academic staff: 70
- Administrative staff: 40
- Students: 1,400
- Location: Grand Rapids, Minnesota, U.S. 47.2420°N 93.4956°W
- Colors: Blue & white
- Nickname: Vikings
- Sporting affiliations: NJCAA, Minnesota College Athletic Conference
- Website: www.itascacc.edu

Minnesota North College – Itasca, formerly Itasca Community College (ICC), is a public community college campus in Grand Rapids, Minnesota. It was founded in 1922 and accredited by the Higher Learning Commission.

In 2022, the board of trustees of the Minnesota State Colleges and Universities merged the college with several others into a single institution called Minnesota North College.

== Academics ==
Enrollment for the 2017–2019 school year was about 1400 students and the college had 40 full-time faculty members. This location offers diplomas, associate degrees, and professional certificates.

== Athletics ==
As part of Minnesota North College, a member of the Minnesota College Athletic Conference (MCAC) National Junior College Athletic Association (NJCAA), Viking Athletics include baseball, softball, men's basketball, women's basketball, volleyball, trap league, and wrestling. In 2000, men's basketball replaced men's ice hockey as a varsity sport. Teams competed in the Minnesota Community College Conference. At the NJCAA National Wrestling Championship held in Rochester, Minnesota on February 22–24, 2007, heavyweight Chris Miller became the campus' first national champion.

== Notable alumni ==
- John T. Davies - Minnesota jurist and legislator
- Justin Eichorn - Minnesota state senator
- Brock Larson - wrestler; retired mixed martial artist
- George Gilbert Wangensteen - Minnesota lawyer and legislator
