= WCMP =

WCMP may refer to:

- World Congress of Muslim Philanthropists, an association that help Islamic donors organize contributions to humanitarian causes.
- WCMP (AM), a radio station (1350 AM) licensed to Pine City, Minnesota, United States
- WCMP-FM, a radio station (100.9 FM) licensed to Pine City, Minnesota, United States
