= Therrien =

Therrien, Therien or Thérien, may refer to:

== People ==
- Césaire Thérien (1824 – 1890), a merchant and political figure in Quebec, Canada
- Olaüs Thérien (1860 – 1929), a lawyer, editor and political figure in Quebec, Canada
- Joseph Edward Therrien (1879 – 1954), an American businessman and politician
- Barney Therrien (born 1940), Canadian football player
- Gaston Therrien (1960), a retired Canadian professional ice hockey player
- Michael Therien, Profess of chemistry at Duke University
- Michel Therrien (1963), head coach of the Montreal Canadiens of the National Hockey League
- Jean-François Therrien (1969), a politician from Quebec, Canada
- Chris Therien (1971), a retired Canadian professional ice hockey defenceman
- Alain Therrien(1966), a Canadian politician
- Jesen Therrien (1993), Canadian former baseball player

== Places ==
- Therien, Alberta, a hamlet in Alberta, Canada
