= Pine County Fair =

Annual fair in Minnesota, United States

- Genre: County fair
- Date: First Weekend in August
- Frequency: annual
- Location: Pine City, Minnesota
- Years active: 127
- Inaugurated: 1892
- Attendance: 40,000 (2017)
- Website: pinecountyfair.com

The Pine County Fair is an annual event held at the Pine County Fairgrounds in Pine City, Minnesota, United States. The fair, like many in Minnesota, includes amusement rides, live entertainment and exhibits of farm animals, food, and flowers along with other types of specialty displays. Youth members of 4-H and Future Farmers of America participate by showing their animals and specialty collections.

== Demolition derby ==
Pine County Fair's biggest draw is the Demolition Derby. Considered the “hardest hitting demolition derby in the Midwest”, the derby draws around 100 registrants each year and sells thousands of tickets, bringing in one-third of the total spending at the fair each year. It is held during the first weekend of August.

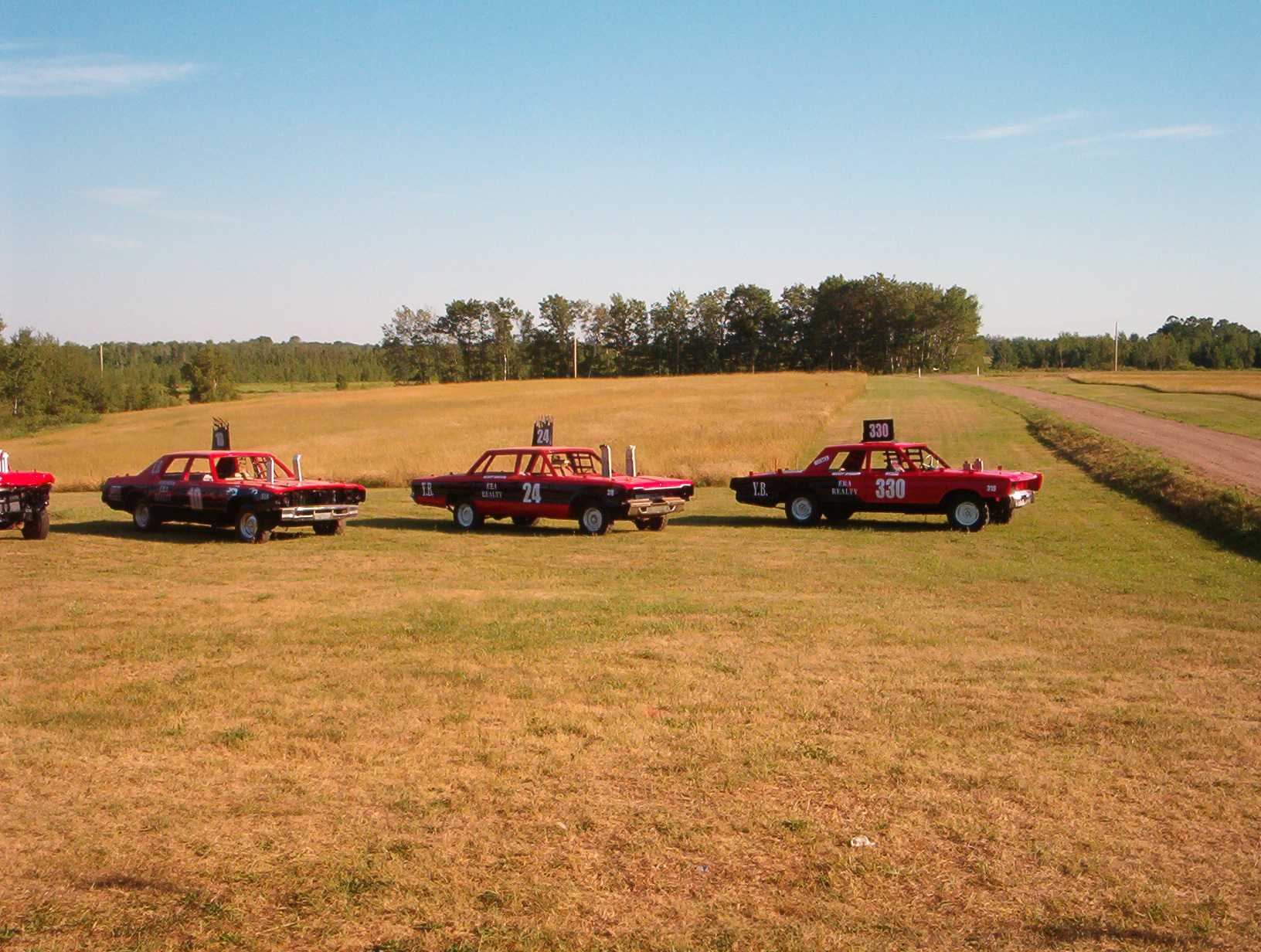
Cars lined up prior to the Pine County Fair demolition derby.

== History ==
- From 1872 to 1888 Pine County and Chisago County held a joint fair.
- In 1911, Governor Adolph Olson Eberhart spoke at the fair.
- No fair was held in 1917–18.
- In 1939, Cedric Adams and Clellan Card were Master of Ceremonies at the grandstand.
- No fair was held between 1942 and 1945.
- In 1978, the first International Polkafest was held at the Pine County Fairgrounds and it was held there until it outgrew the space.
- In 1996, the grandstand was burned in a fire and later rebuilt with the help of the Pine City Lions.
- In 2014, the movie Derby Fever, by Dell Gross, about the Pine County Fair demotion derby, was released and shown at the Highway 61 Film Festival.
- In 2017, the economic impact of the fair on Pine City was studied.
- In 2018, a new beer garden and event center debuted at the Pine County Fairgrounds.
- In 2019, Governor Tim Walz visited the Pine County Fair with Ag Commissioner Thom Petersen.
- In 2020, the COVID-19 pandemic was to blame for cancellation of the fair.
- In 2021, fairgoers were paid $100 to get COVID-19 vaccinations.
