= Roy Carlson =

Roy Carlson may refer to:

- Roy Carlson (American football player) (1906–1984), American football player in the NFL
- Roy E. Carlson (1918–1995), American football and baseball coach
- Roy Carl Carlson (1937–2011), American educator and politician.
