= Pioneer (newspaper) =

Pioneer or The Pioneer is the name of the following newspapers:

== Australia ==
- The Federal Capital Pioneer, newspaper published in Canberra, Australia from 1924–27
- The Pioneer (South Australia), newspaper published in Yorketown, South Australia 1903–60

== India ==
- The Pioneer (India), an English-language newspaper published since 1865

== United Kingdom ==
- Merthyr Pioneer, weekly socialist paper published in Wales from 1911 to 1922
- North Wales Pioneer, a newspaper in Wales

== United States ==
- Animas Forks Pioneer, published from 1882 to 1886 in Animas Forks, Colorado
- Black Hills Pioneer, published in Spearfish, South Dakota
- The Madras Pioneer, a weekly paper published in Madras, Oregon, since 1904
- Molalla Pioneer, a local weekly newspaper in Molalla, Oregon, which began publishing in 1913
- Pine City Pioneer, a weekly newspaper publisher in Pine County, Minnesota
- The Pioneer, a short-lived nineteenth-century journal co-founded by James Russell Lowell in Massachusetts.
- The Pioneer (Bemidji), published in Bemidji, Minnesota
- St. Paul Pioneer Press, published in St. Paul, Minnesota

== See also ==
- Raivaaja (English: The Pioneer), a Finnish-American newspaper published from 1905–2009 in Fitchburg, Massachusetts
- Journal Pioneer, daily newspaper published in Summerside, Prince Edward Island, Canada
- Craven Herald & Pioneer, weekly newspaper covering the Craven area of North Yorkshire, England
- The Labour Pioneer, a monthly socialist periodical issued from Cardiff, Wales between 1900 and 1902
- Den Danske Pioneer, oldest Danish language newspaper published in the United States
- Pioneer (disambiguation)
