= East-Central Minnesota Pride =

Annual LGBTQ pride celebration in Pine City, Minnesota

Coordinates: 45°49′38″N 92°58′9″W

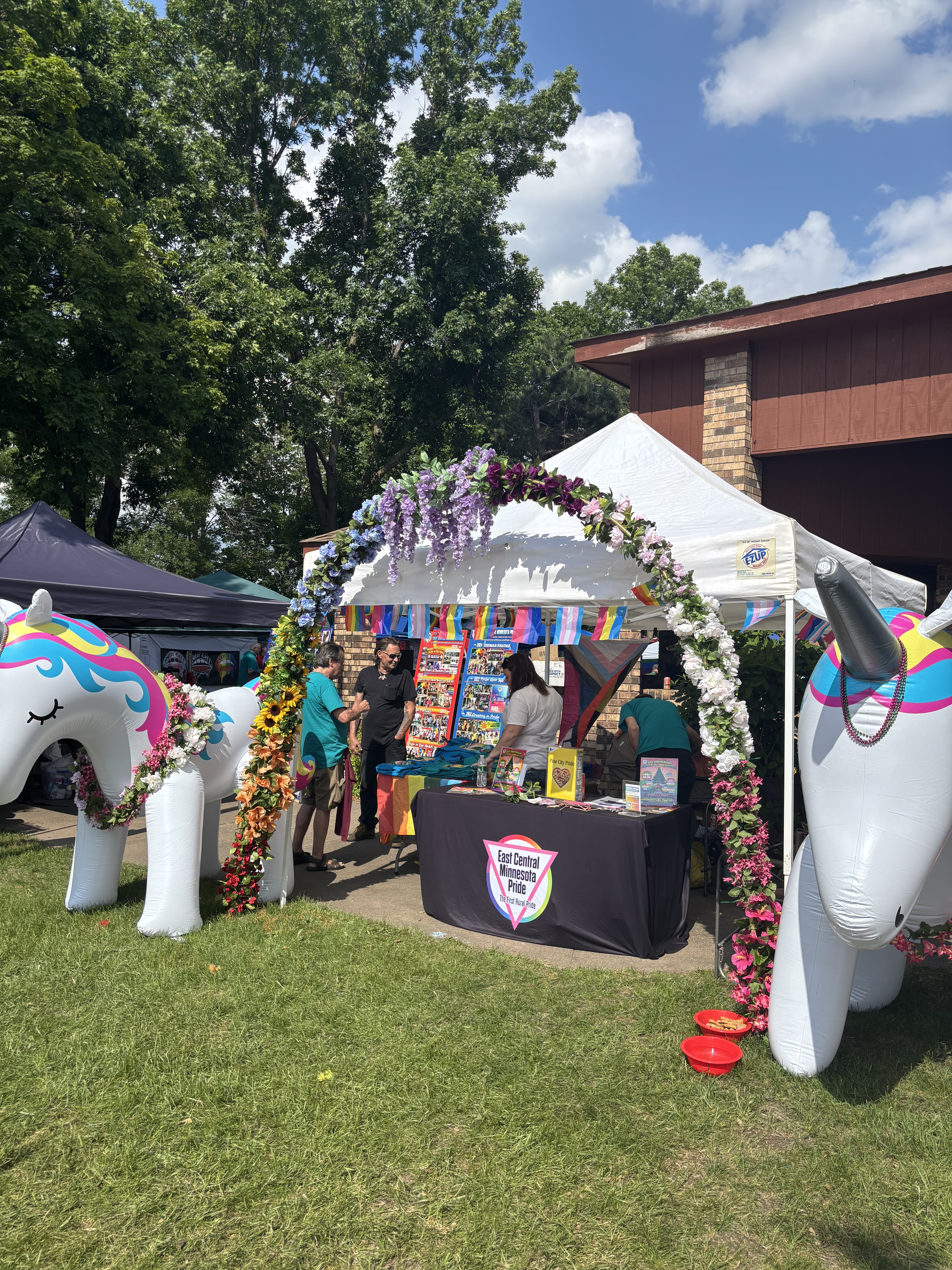
Festival information booth

East-Central Minnesota Pride is an annual celebration of lesbian, gay, bisexual, transgender, and queer (LGBTQ) residents in the rural area near Pine City, Minnesota, United States. At the time of its inception, it was the first rural community in the U.S. to hold a Pride celebration. It was also the first pride gathering held outside of a metropolitan area in Minnesota. The celebration is held during the first weekend in June.

== Background ==
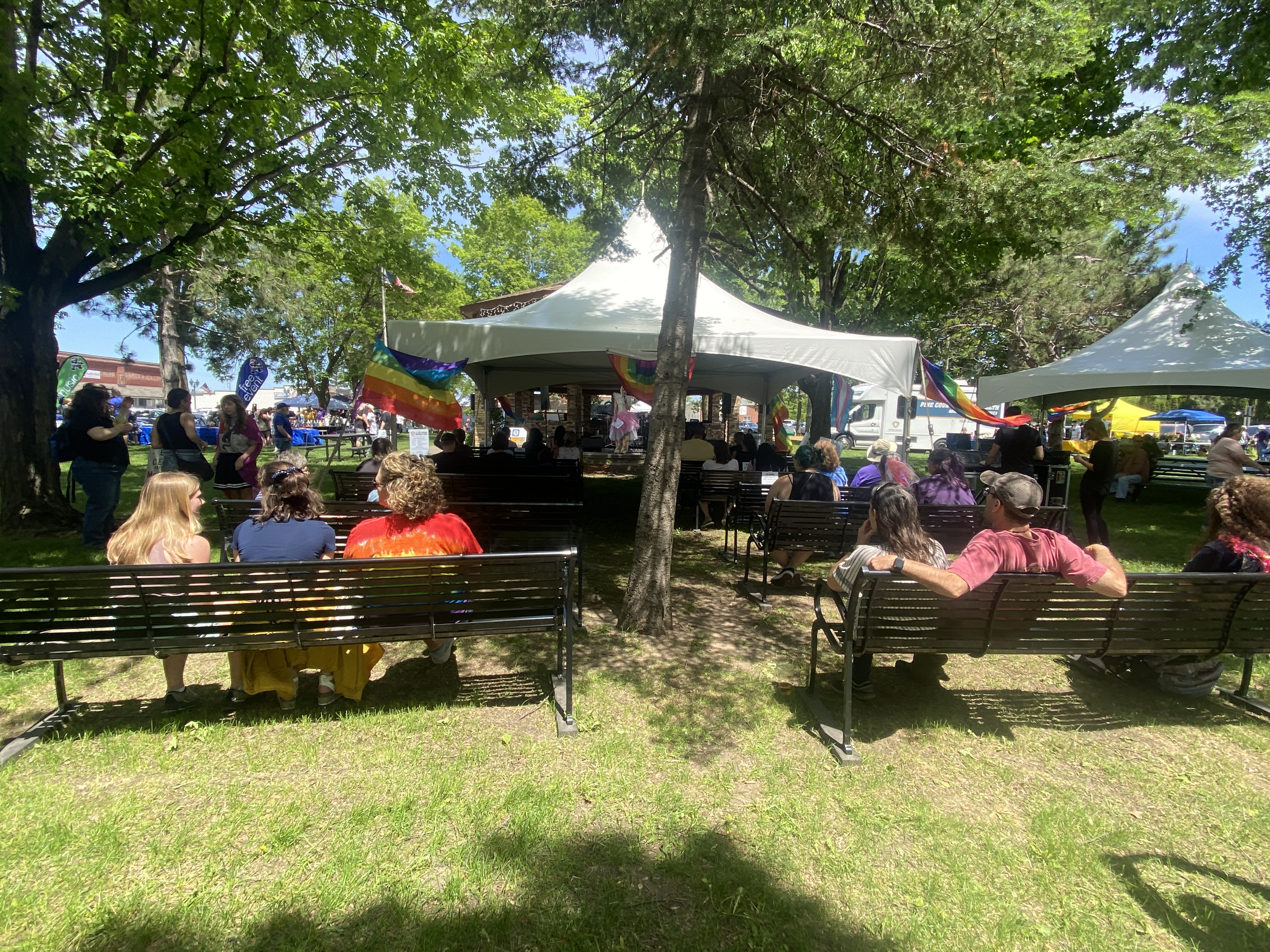
Audience watching show in bandshell in Robinson Park

East Central Minnesota consists of Pine, Isanti, Chisago, Kanabec, and Mille Lacs counties. The 2010 US Census identified Pine City and its surrounding area as one of the highest concentration same-sex coupled households of any non-metropolitan areas in the state.

To recognize the 5th anniversary of the East Central Men's Circle, which provides support to gay, bisexual, transgender, and questioning men in the area, a picnic was held in 2005. Hundreds of people turned out for the occasion. This event is recognised as the first East Central Minnesota Pride event.

East-Central Minnesota Pride became an official nonprofit in 2010.

In 2020, the event was canceled to help prevent the spread of COVID-19.

Other community organizations and groups have since become involved in the planning and running of the event, including East Central Purple Circle, a group of lesbian, queer, and allied women in the region; and East Central Minnesota Parents, Families, and Friends of Lesbians and Gays (PFLAG).

== History ==
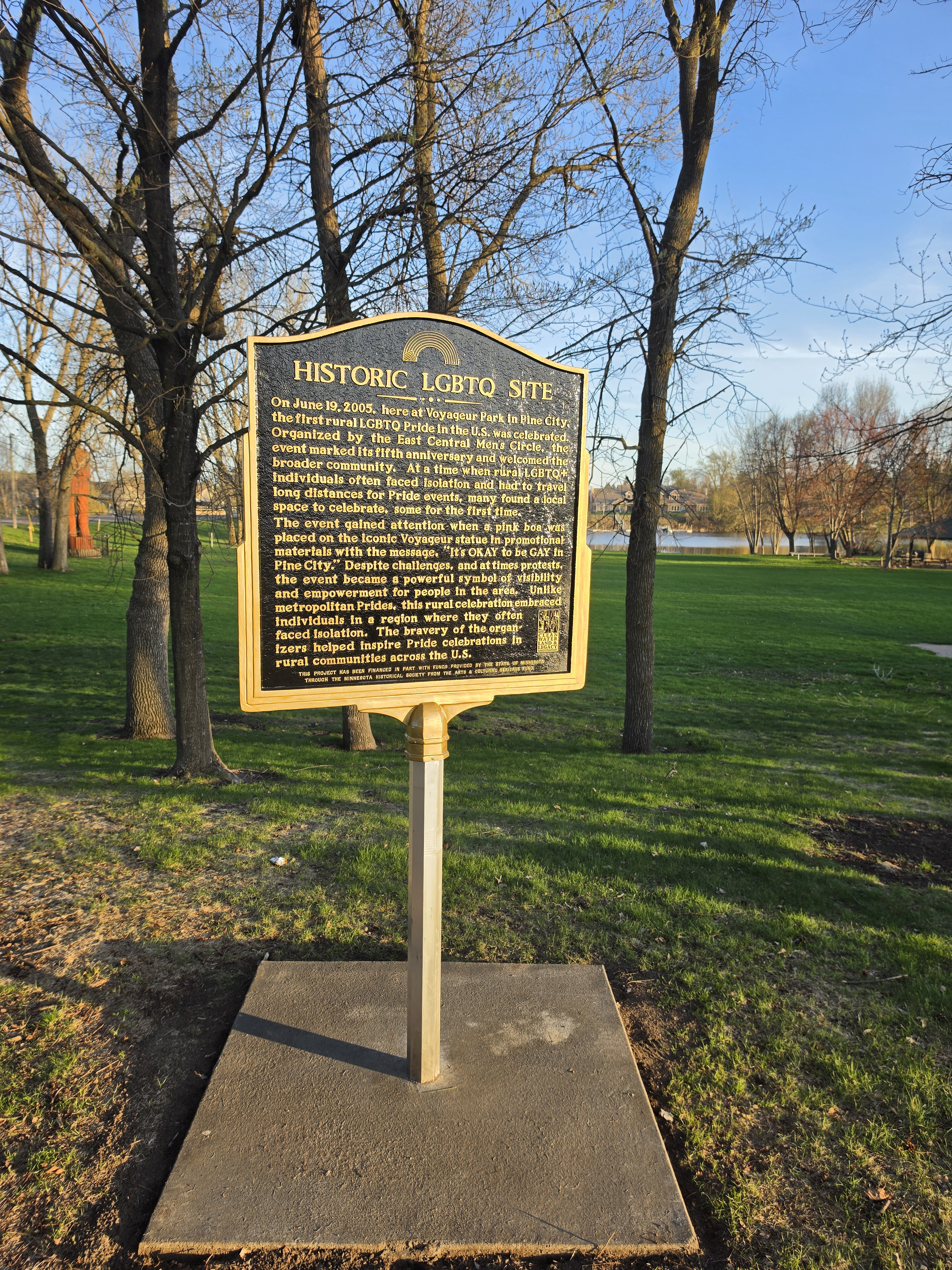
The first rural Pride historic marker

In 2026, a historic marker commemorating East-Central Minnesota Pride was installed at Voyageur Park in Pine City.

== Controversies ==
Early Pride events were subject to counter-protests across town in a separate park, and were billed as pro family events. Rural Pine County residents claimed they were offended by a Pride advertisement stating, "It's okay to be GAY in Pine City", featuring a pink boa on the town's iconic monument, François the Voyageur.

In 2014, Pine County Commissioner Mitch Pangerl called Pride organizers "bad apples" at a county board meeting for using a community sign on school property to promote the event. The sign referenced was used by more than 20 community groups and nonprofit organizations until East Central Minnesota Pride, also a nonprofit, wanted space to promote its event; then the school voted to use the sign only for school-related events.

In 2022, concerns were expressed that Marraccino was an inappropriate emcee for the Pride event due to his past experience as a pornographic film actor. The City of Pine City stood by the event and did not withhold any necessary permitting for it to occur.

== Awards and nominations ==
Year	Award	Description	Nominator(s)	Result
2011	Minnesota Community Pride! Showcase Award	This award, given at the Minnesota State Fair, highlights the celebration of diversity and culture in the community, particularly with East-Central Minnesota Pride and Pine City’s embracing of its people, as well as its courage and the fact that it is a welcoming community.	City of Pine City	Won

== Notable performers ==
- The Big Wu
- Chastity Brown
- Kat Perkins
- Barb Ryman
- Tommy Ryman
- Esera Tuaolo
