= Senator Burrows (disambiguation) =

Julius C. Burrows (1837–1915) was a U.S. Senator from Michigan. Senator Burrows may also refer to:

- George B. Burrows (1832–1909), Wisconsin State Senate
- Latham A. Burrows (1792–1855), New York State Senate
- Randall K. Burrows (1829–after 1874), Minnesota State Senate
- Warren Booth Burrows (1877–1952), Connecticut State Senate
