= Pine City High School =

Coordinates: 45°48′37.16″N 92°58′6.07″W

Location
- 1400 Main Street South; Pine City, Minnesota 55063; United States

Information
- Type: Public
- Motto: "Preparing our students for the future"
- Established: 1910
- Principal: Laura Yehlik(10–12); Timothy Coleman (7–9)
- Staff: 36.50 (FTE)
- Grades: 7–12
- Enrollment: 699 (2023-2024)
- Student to teacher ratio: 19.15
- Mascot: Dragon
- Colors: Kelly green and white
- Website: www.isd578.org/page/pchshome

Pine City High School is a six-year public high school located in Pine City, Minnesota, United States. Pine City is a fourth-tier suburb (exurb) of Minneapolis. The school was founded in 1910 and has a current enrollment of approximately 800 students, making it the largest school in Pine County. The nickname for the school's athletic teams is the Dragons.

== History ==
Pine City High School was established in 1910, although the first graduating class from what is now Pine City High School was June 1, 1903, (the newly constructed Webster School). When the school was first built, many children who lived outside the city of Pine City attended local country schools and then in their later grades attended PCHS.

== Extracurricular ==
Pine City is noted for its strong tradition in the fine and performing arts, and in 2010, 2011, and 2012 was named to the NAMM Foundation's list of "Best Communities for Music Education in America". Both the Concert Band and Concert Choir consistently receive Superior ratings at Large Group Contests and several All-State Band and Choir students have been selected from Pine City music ensembles in recent years. The One-Act Play won its Sub-Section in 2009 with All in the Timing and in 2010 with The Exonerated; in 2011 it placed second in the Section Finals (out of 18) with The Arkansaw Bear and third in 2012 with slasreveR neveS. The Speech Team is the 2009, 2010, 2011 and 2012 Two Rivers Conference Champions. Extra-curricular activities include:

- Fall Play
- German Club
- Jazz Band
- National Honor Society
- One Act Play
- Pep Band
- Spanish Club
- Speech
- Student Council
- Yearbook Production
- Fall Musical and Musical Revue
- Band
- Choir
- Pine City Singers Chamber Choir

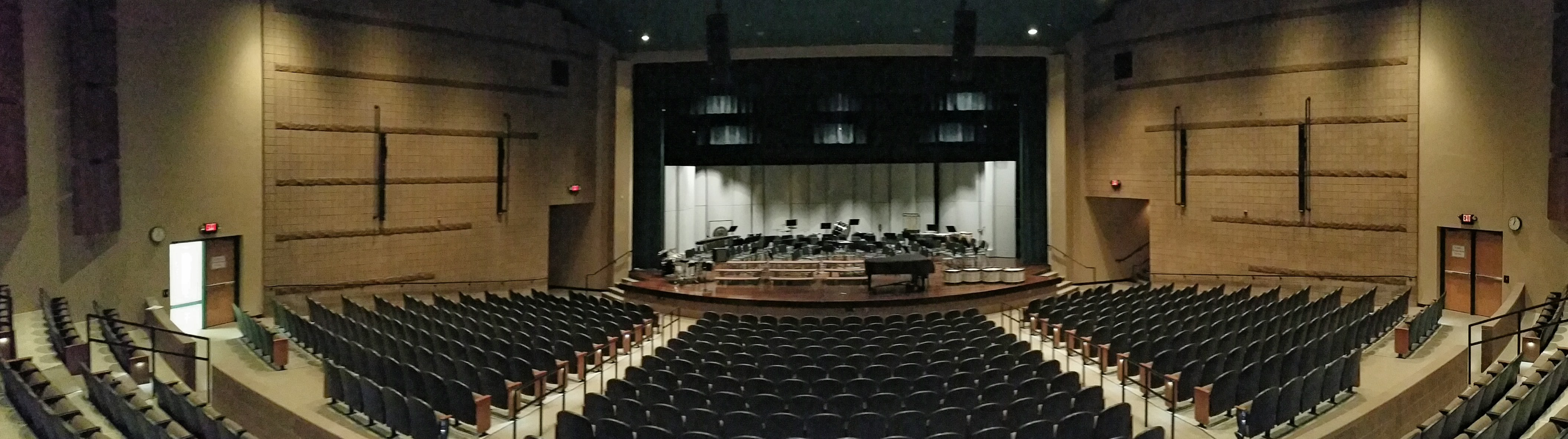
The auditorium at PCHS

== Sports ==
- Fall
  - Football
  - Girls Tennis
  - Volleyball
  - Cross Country
  - Cheerleading
- Winter
  - Boys Basketball
  - Girls Basketball
  - Wrestling (a co-op with Hinckley-Finlayson and East Central High School)
  - Gymnastics (a co-op with Rush City and Hinckley-Finlayson)
  - Boys Hockey (a co-op with Rush City and Hinckley-Finlayson)
  - Girls Hockey
  - Cheerleading
- Spring
  - Boys Tennis
  - Softball
  - Baseball
  - Golf
  - Track and Field (2011 Class A 4x100M relay State Champions)

== Notable alumni ==
Home of the Dragons

- Ryan Anderson – (1999) musher
- Ben Boo – (1943) politician, former mayor of Duluth, Minnesota
- Jenna Jambeck – (1992) researcher
- Otto Kuss – (1929) professional wrestler
- Trent Laugerman – (2003) drummer for Vanilla Ice
- Karla Nelsen – (1983) bodybuilder; 1993 AAU Ms. America
- Jason Rarick – (1988) politician
- Allison Rosati – (1981), reporter WMAQ-TV
- Jon Rydberg – (1996), paralympian
