= Joe Karas =

American politician from Minnesota

Joe Karas was an American politician and businessman.

Born in Rice County, Minnesota, Karas was a farmer and manager of Farm Mutual Fire Insurance Company. He served in local government. He served in the Minnesota House of Representatives from 1949 to 1955 while residing in Pine City, Minnesota.
