= Barb Ryman =

American singer-songwriter (born 1951)

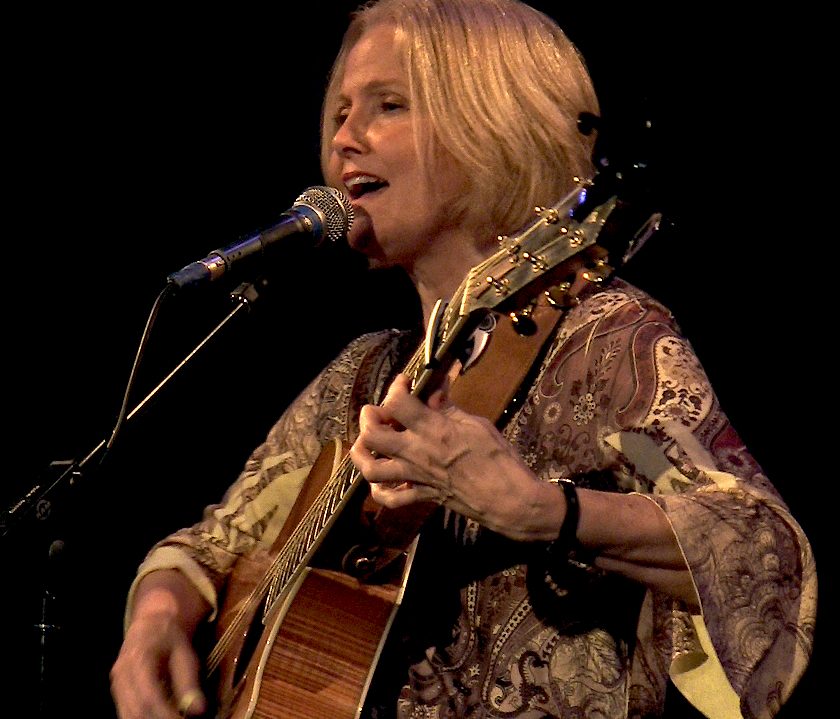
- Ryman in 2012

Background information
- Born: Barbara Ann Ryman; February 3, 1951 (age 75); Corpus Christi, Texas, U.S.
- Genres: Americana, indie folk
- Occupations: Singer-songwriter, spiritual healer
- Instruments: Vocals, guitar
- Years active: 1991–present
- Labels: CD Baby, Barb Ryman / Renegade
- Website: www.barbryman.com

Barbara Ann Ryman (born February 3, 1951) is an American singer-songwriter and spiritual healer.

Her first album, Winds of Good Fortune, was released in 1993, and she has since released six more albums: Lay Me Open (1995), Like A Tree (1998), Falling Down to Heaven (2002), Earthbound (2007), Catch the Sunset (2012) and her most recent, Breathe (2019), respectively.

== Musical career ==
Ryman began playing at Twin Cities coffeehouses but as her career took off, she nationally toured the folk circuit playing at such venues as Boston's Club Passim, her hometown's The Cedar Cultural Center, Nashville's Bluebird Café, Portland's Folk Music Society, and Texas' Uncle Calvin's. Her music has since charted nationally on Folk-DJ’s top albums chart as well as on NACC. Ryman has been featured on The Midnight Special, a syndicated radio show, and The Morning Show. She headlined the first rural LGBT Pride, East-Central Minnesota Pride. In 2006, the ABC TV show Sons & Daughters licensed Ryman's song, All American Dysfunctional Family. Ryman had artist and album reviews published in the StarTribune, and on TwinCities.com, as well as national folk and world music media including Dirty Linen and Sing Out!. According to Sault Ste. Marie's SooToday.com, "Ryman lays insightful, witty lyrics into a rich mosaic of contemporary folk, gentle rock, and country blues, delivering it all with a clear, compelling voice. She gently charms every audience she meets with her sincerity and playful stage banter."

=== Awards ===
Ryman was nominated for several music awards by the Minnesota Music Academy, including Songwriter of the Year and Folk Album of the Year. She was past winner of the McKnight Composer Fellowship from the McKnight Foundation (2002). In 2007, Ryman was a NewSong Showcase winner at the Walnut Valley Festival in the Feeling Good category with her song "Strawberry Pie". She was a finalist in other competitions, such as at Big Top Chautauqua and at the Great River Folk Fest.

== Personal life ==
Besides being a performing songwriter, Ryman also carries out energy work on individuals and with rivers.

Ryman's son is comedian Tommy Ryman.

== Discography ==
- Winds of Good Fortune (1993)
- Lay Me Open (1995)
- Like A Tree (1998)
- Falling Down to Heaven (2002)
- Earthbound (2007)
- Catch the Sunset (2012)
- Breathe (2019)
