= Dorothy Swanda Jones =

American politician (1929–1993)

Mayor of Matanuska-Susitna Borough, Alaska
- In office 1984–1991
- Preceded by: Edna DeVries
- Succeeded by: Ernie Brannon

Personal details
- Born: Dorothy Ann Swanda; October 29, 1929 Pine City, Minnesota
- Died: January 30, 1993 (aged 63) Talkeetna, Alaska
- Occupation: Businesswoman, politician

Dorothy Swanda Jones (October 29, 1929 – January 30, 1993) was an Alaskan politician in the Matanuska-Susitna Borough. After her death, the Mat-Su Borough Administrative Headquarters building, located in Palmer, Alaska, was renamed in her honor as the Dorothy Swanda Jones Building in 1994.

== Early life ==
Jones was born Dorothy Ann Swanda in Pine City, Minnesota on October 29, 1929. In 1935, she moved to Palmer, Alaska with her parents and brother. They were one of 203 farm families, including 66 from Minnesota, relocated to Palmer as part of the New Deal-era Matanuska Valley Colony project. Before Dorothy relocated to Anchorage with her family, she attended the Matanuska Colony Central School. In Anchorage, Jones attended and graduated from Anchorage High School. Following high school she attended business college in California before returning to Anchorage.

== Government service ==
Jones was first appointed to the Mat Su Borough Assembly in 1979, and was reelected for two additional terms. She then served the maximum two terms as Borough Mayor from 1984 to 1991. Following her stint as Borough Mayor, she was again elected to the Borough Assembly in 1991 for a three-year term. She died in office a little more than a year into that term.

== Dorothy Swanda Jones Building ==
The Matanuska Colony School building where Jones attended school as a young child, which had become the administrative headquarters of the borough government, was renamed the Dorothy Swanda Jones Building in August 1993.
