= John Sayer (fur trader) =

Canadian fur trader (c. 1750–1818)

John Sayer (c. 1750 – 2 October 1818) was an early Canadian fur trader. He was one of the earliest traders working out of Fort Michilimackinac to winter in the Leech Lake, Minnesota area. During the winter of 1804–1805, he wintered along the Snake River near present-day Pine City, Minnesota, where he helped establish the North West Company at the site of the present-day Snake River Trading Post.
