= Frederick A. Hodge =

American businessman and politician

Frederick A. Hodge (1853–1922) was an American businessman and politician.

Born in New Hampshire, Hodge came to Minnesota in 1870. He lived in Pine City, Minnesota and was in the real estate and loan business. He served in the Minnesota Senate from 1894 to 1898 as a Republican.
