= 1995 in radio =

The year 1995 saw a number of significant events in radio broadcasting.

== Events ==
- January 1 – KAEV in Lake Arrowhead, California changes to KCXX with an alternative rock format.
- January 28 – The final original American Top 40 airs internationally only. The final Long Distance Dedication is "Move On" by James Brown, from host Shadoe Stevens to the show's listeners.
- February 15 – After nine years as a "Pure Rock" station, Long Beach, California's 105.5 KNAC flips to a Mexican music format as KBUE (Que Buena). KNAC was, however, resurrected in 1998 as the internet-based radio station knac.com.
- March
  - After several years of playing contemporary Christian music, KQCS (93.5 FM) in Bettendorf, Iowa switches to an active rock format and adopts the call letters KORB.
  - After 22 years as KRVR (106.5 FM), under a format that had evolved from beautiful music to a hybrid of beautiful, easy listening and adult contemporary and had been known to locals as "K-River," the call letters and format are changed for this Davenport, Iowa station. The new call sign is KCQQ and – known as Q106 and Q106.5 – the format is switched to classic hits, eventually evolving to classic rock.
- March 4 – Partners For Christian Media signs Contemporary Christian station J103 on the air in Chattanooga, TN.
- March 28 – KJJO in Minneapolis, Minnesota flips to smooth jazz as KMJZ.
- May 12 – Mora, Minnesota gets its first radio outlet, as new FM station KBEK signs on with 25 kW of power on 95.5 MHz.
- June – WUAE/Providence signs on for the first time.
- July – Evergreen Media acquires Pyramid Broadcasting's 12 station group for $306.5 million; the sale closes the following January.
- August – Chancellor Broadcasting announces it will acquire Shamrock Broadcasting's 19 station group for $365 million.
- September 27 – The BBC in the United Kingdom and Sveriges Radio in Sweden both begin Digital Audio Broadcasting.
- September 30 – "SoundWave" (later known as 96.4FM The Wave) – sister network to Wales's first local commercial radio station Swansea Sound – goes on air.
- October – Montreal radio host Pierre Brassard makes a prank call to Queen Elizabeth II impersonating Canadian prime minister Jean Chrétien. Elizabeth, believing that she is speaking to Chrétien, says that she supports Canadian unity and would try to influence the 1995 Quebec referendum on proposals to break away from Canada.

== Debuts ==
- July – Cigar Dave hosts the first broadcast of Smoke This!
- August - 95.1 RW begins broadcast in San Fernando, Pampanga, Philippines.

== Closings ==
- January 28 – Final broadcast of the original American Top 40.
- October 6 — Ken Beatrice's last show on WMAL in Washington, DC.
- December 1 – Final broadcast of Chippie, a German program on computer topics, produced by the Hessischer Rundfunk (Hessian Broadcasting).

== Deaths ==
- Tom Clay, 66, American radio personality and disc jockey.
- Bob Cruz, 42, American Disc Jockey hired to replace Jay Reynolds at WABC (AM) in 1976.
- Gary Dee, 60, pioneer in controversial talk radio, mostly in Cleveland, Ohio.
- Gerald Durrell, 70, British naturalist, zookeeper, author, and radio and television presenter
- Simon Gellar, 75, owner of WVCA: Gloucester, Ma. (now WNKC) on July 11.
- J. P. McCarthy, 62, American radio personality
- Vivian Stanshall, 51, English comedian, writer, artist, broadcaster, and musician (born 1943)
- 1 June, Dallas Townsend, 76, an American broadcast journalist who worked for CBS Radio and television for over 40 years.
- 2 February, Willard Waterman, 80, a character actor in films, TV and on radio, remembered best for succeeding Harold Peary as the title character of The Great Gildersleeve at the height of that show's popularity.
- Wolfman Jack, 57, American disc jockey

== See also ==
- Radio broadcasting
