= Johnny Mold =

- Born: Pine City, Minnesota
- Occupation: Snowmobile racer

Johnny Mold is a pro snowmobile racer from Pine City, Minnesota. Nicknamed Jammin', he made eight of 10 finals on the WSA National Series in '03/'04.

== Competitive history ==
Year, Event, Location, Sport, Discipline (Finish):

- 2004 WSA Canterbury National, Minneapolis, MN, SNX, Pro Stock (12th)
- 2004 WSA Canterbury National, Minneapolis, MN, SNX, Pro Open (6th)
- 2004 WSA National, Shawano, WI, SNX, Pro Open (10th)
- 2003 WSA Park-X National, Hill City, MN, SNX, Pro Stock (11th)
- 2003 WSA Park-X National, Hill City, MN, SNX, Pro Open (10th)
- 2003 WSA National, Winnipeg, MB, SNX, Pro Stock (8th)
- 2003 WSA National, Winnipeg, MB, SNX, Pro Open (11th)
- 2003 WSA Spirit Mtn. National, Duluth, MN, SNX, Pro Open (6th)
- 2001 WSA Regional, Thief River Falls, MN, SMB Pro 440 (1st)

== X-Games history ==
Year, Sport, Discipline (Finish):

- Winter 2004 SMB Snocross (24th)
- Winter 2002 SMB Snocross (24th)
