= Little Things (film) =

- Teaser poster
- Directed by: Rati Tsiteladze
- Written by: Nino Varsimashvili
- Produced by: Rati Tsiteladze; Roman Simonyan
- Starring: Rati Tsiteladze; Nino Varsimashvili; Ivan Gridin
- Cinematography: Roman Simonyan
- Release date: September 10, 2014 (Accolade Film Awards)
- Running time: 15 minutes
- Countries: Georgia; United Arab Emirates
- Language: English

Little Things is a 2014 drama short film directed by Rati Tsiteladze and written by Nino Varsimashvili.

== Synopsis ==
After the marriage Sophie realizes that once loving relationship with her husband, suddenly turns distant and decides to take action.

== Crew ==
- Written by Nino Varsimashvili
- Cinematography by Roman Simonyan
- Art direction by Olga Slusareva
- Produced by Rati Tsiteladze and Roman Simonyan

== Cast ==
- Nino Varsimashvili as Sophie
- Rati Tsiteladze as Husband
- Ivan Gridin as Delivery man

== Reception ==
The film gained national and international recognition.

== Awards and nominations ==
Awards and nominations for Little Things
Year	Association	Award Category	Status
2015	Flagler Film Festival	Audience Choice Award – International Drama	Won
2015	Flagler Film Festival	Best Actress	Nominated
2015	Flagler Film Festival	Best Foreign Film	Nominated
2014	Accolade Competition	Award of Merit, short film	Won
2014	Highway 61 Film Festival	Drama Short	Finalist

== Official selection ==
- The Tallinn Festival of New Cinema 2014
- Flagler Film Festival
- Highway 61 Film Festival
- 5th Siliguri International Short Film and Documentary Contest 2014
- Imphal International Film Festival
- On the Line Film Festival
- Eastern Breeze International Film Festival
