= Otto Kuss =

American professional wrestler

Otto "Pat" Kuss
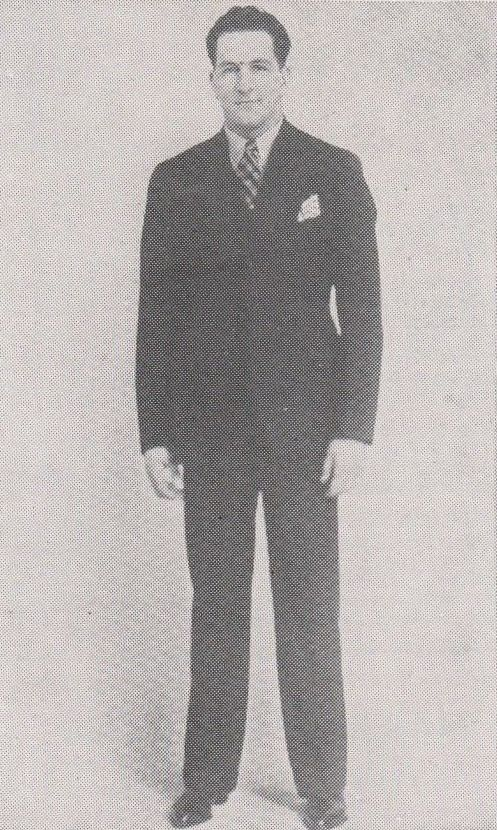

Personal information
- Born: Otto Kuss; March 12, 1911
- Died: March, 1980 (age 68 or 69)

Professional wrestling career
- Ring name: Otto Kuss
- Billed weight: 220 (heavyweight)

Otto Robert "Pat" Kuss (March 12, 1911 – March, 1980) was an American professional wrestler who was best known for his work with Central States Wrestling from 1948 to 1950, and 1952 as well as Stampede Wrestling in 1952.

== NCAA wrestling ==
Otto Kuss lettered four years at Indiana from 1931 to 1934. He earned All-America honors in 1934 with a second-place finish at the NCAA Wrestling Championship. During his four-year career, the Hoosiers went 27-2, including four Big Ten and one NCAA championship. He is the only Hoosier to have lettered on NCAA championship teams in two sports, track and wrestling (1932). He also played football for the Hoosiers.

== Professional wrestling career ==
Kuss competed in 38 states and in New Zealand, wrestling 331 people in that time. He retired from the sport in 1962.

== Personal life ==
Kuss grew up in Pine City, Minnesota, the son of Cyril and Rose Kuss. He had three brothers and they all attended Pine City High School. Otto went on to college at Indiana University. He lived in Minnesota during most of his professional wrestling career and made Houston, Texas his second home. He married a woman named Virginia. After retiring from wrestling, he became a referee. He died in Texas in March, 1980 at age 68.
