= Louis Brouillard =

American Catholic priest (1921–2018)

- Born: July 27, 1921; Minnesota, U.S.
- Died: October 10, 2018 (aged 97); Pine City, Minnesota, U.S.
- Occupation: Catholic priest
- Known for: Sexually abusing children in Guam

Louis Brouillard (July 27, 1921 – October 10, 2018) was an American Catholic priest involved in high-profile Catholic Church sexual abuse cases.

== Sexual abuse scandal ==
Brouillard was ordained December 17, 1948, and served on Guam from 1948 to 1981, teaching at San Vicente and Father Dueñas Memorial School while he was a priest. He was later accused of abusing more than 130 boys in sex abuse claims brought against the Catholic Church. A lawsuit was filed against him as recently as six days prior to his death. Lawsuits were also brought against the Boy Scouts of America, because Brouillard was a scoutmaster. Brouillard's victims' accounts ranged from being molested during swimming trips to rape. According to Brouillard, while church members knew about his actions then, they did not tell him to stop, but rather to pray. In 1981, he was sent away to Minnesota, and ended up living in Pine City, Minnesota serving a nearby parish, St. Joseph in Beroun, until he was barred from doing so in 1984. He lived in Pine City, and his legal deposition was held there October 31 through November 3, 2017, when he was 96. He admitted to as many as 20 of the incidents.
