= Snake River Trading Post =

Museum in Minnesota

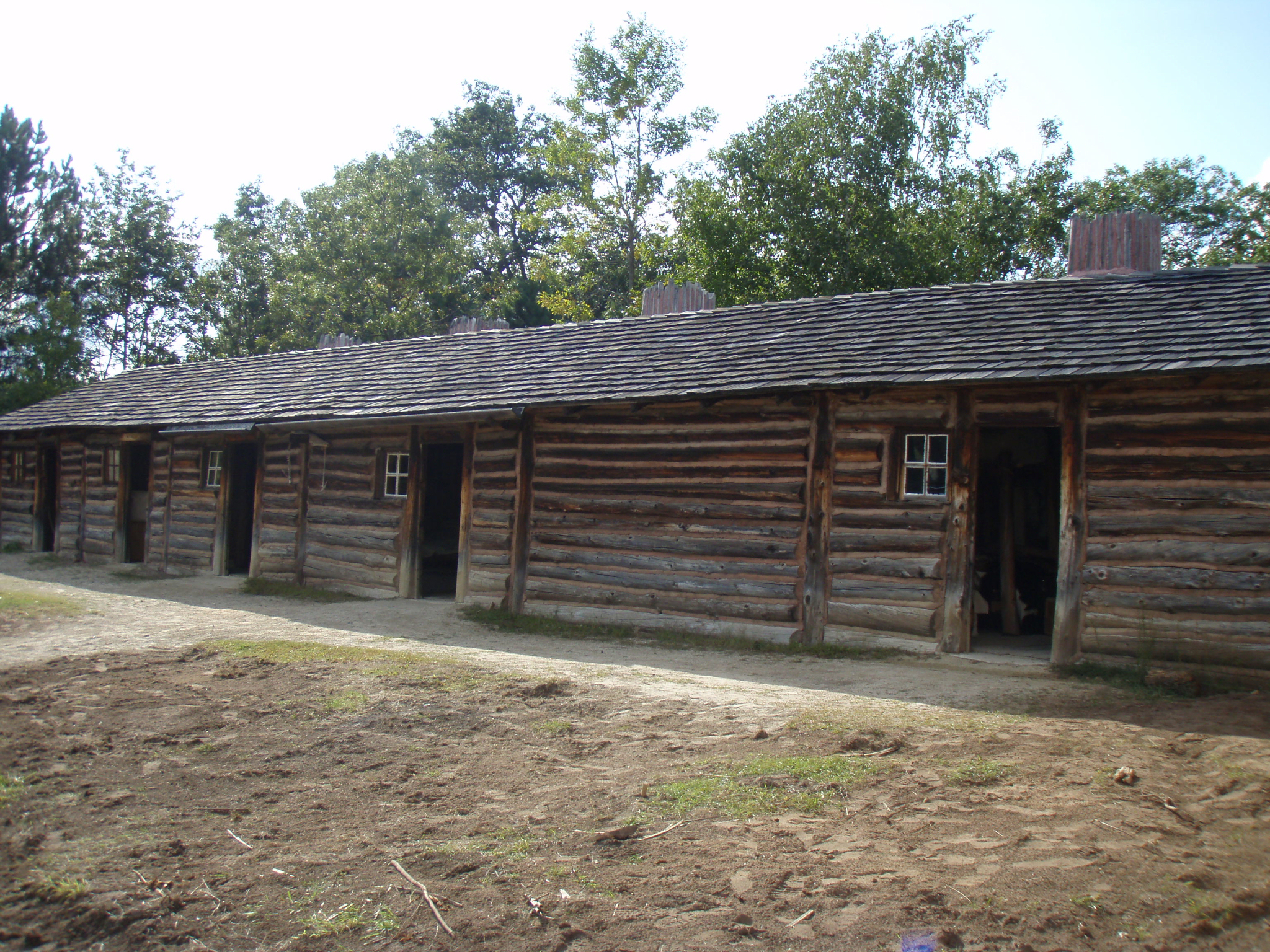
- Museum in 2006
- Established: 1970
- Location: 12551 Voyageur Ln, Pine City, Minnesota, United States
- Coordinates: 45°49′17″N 93°0′41″W
- Type: Local history
- Website: www.mnhs.org/furpost
- Snake River Fur Post
- U.S. National Register of Historic Places
- Minnesota State Register of Historic Places
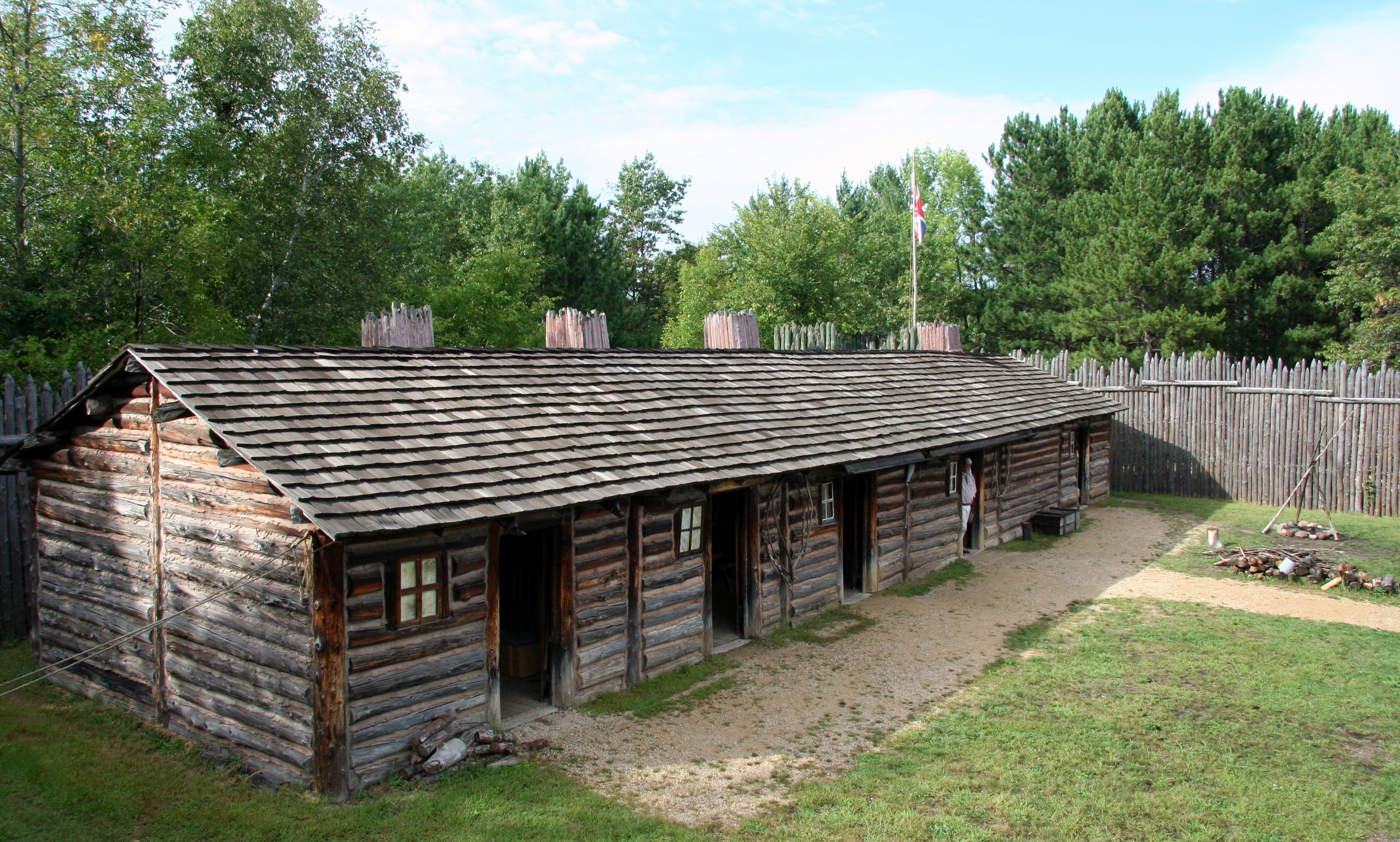
- The rowhouse reconstructed to its 1804 appearance
- Built: 1804
- NRHP reference No.: 72000679
- Added to NRHP: August 7, 1972

The Snake River Trading Post is a reconstructed fur trade post on the Snake River west of Pine City, Minnesota, United States. The post was established in the fall of 1804 by John Sayer, a partner in the North West Company, and built by his crew of voyageurs. The site operated for several years, although its exact period of operation is unknown. It was later destroyed by fire.

The discovery of artifacts in the 1930s revealed the site. Excavation in the 1960s added to knowledge about it, enabling accurate reconstruction of the post. The site is listed on the National Register of Historic Places and is operated as a state historic site by the Minnesota Historical Society.

== History ==
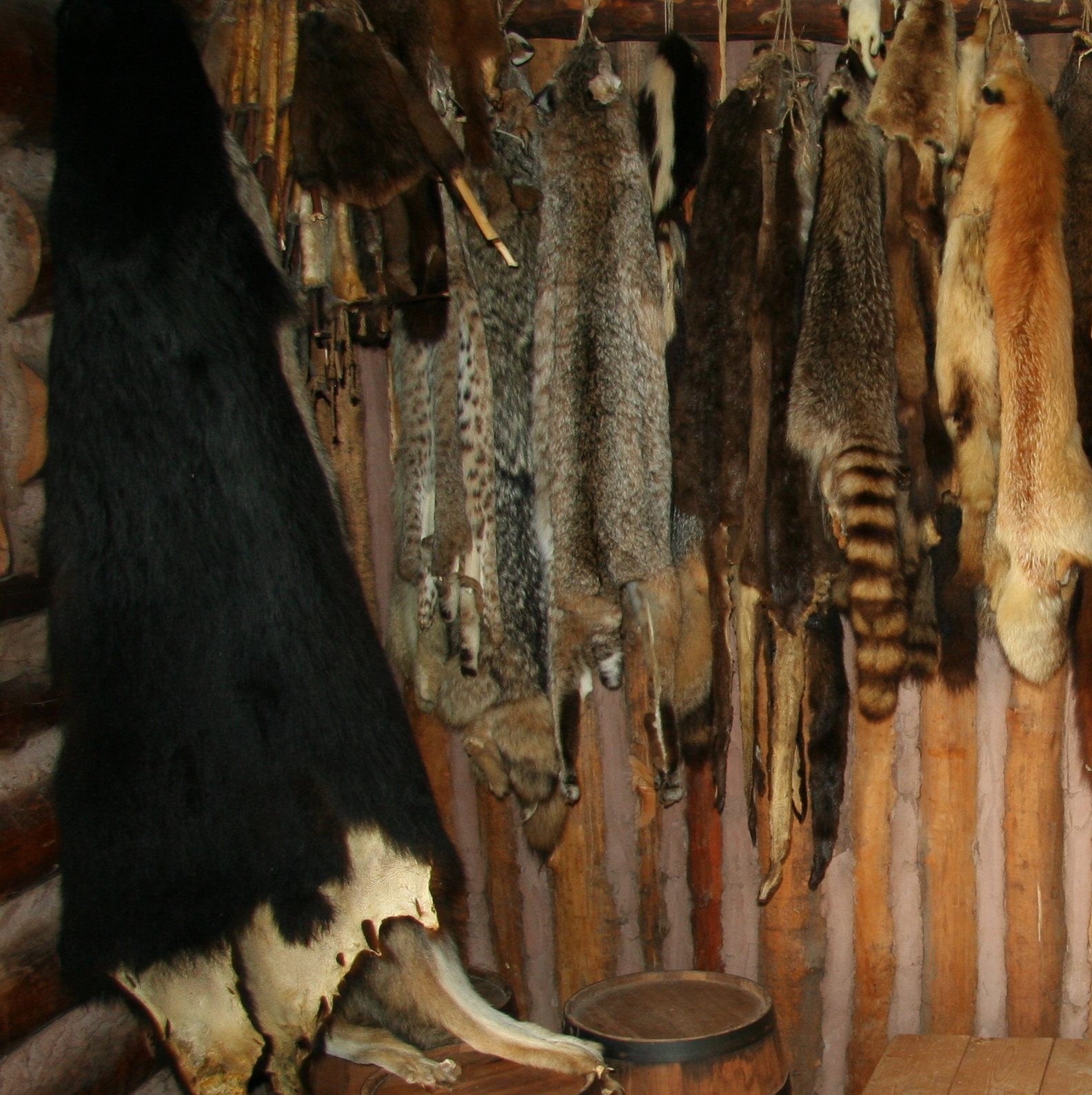
A display of furs traded at the post

The North West Company was formed in Montreal in the mid-1780s from a partnership of British merchants. The company established a large post at Grand Portage and built several other forts to house wintering voyageurs. Besides the Snake River forts, they also established forts at Fond du Lac (now part of modern Duluth), Big Sandy Lake, and Leech Lake in Minnesota.

A typical fort would include a dwelling for the clerk, a storehouse, and a bunkhouse for the ten to twenty voyageurs who spent the winter. During the winters, the voyageurs would collect the pelts of beaver, otter, muskrat, deer, bear, marten, and other animals whose hides were useful. Dakota and Ojibwe men would kill and skin the animals, while the women would prepare the hides by stretching and drying them. The hides were typically regarded as the women's property, so they would arrange the sales with the clerk of the trading post. In return, the clerks would supply the Indians with trade goods, such as firearms, blankets, and cooking utensils. The fur trade, which had been going on for more than 100 years further east, was mutually beneficial, since the Indians received the products of early industrialization. The furs were sold to Europeans who made felt hats and fur coats.

The site was rediscovered in 1931 by a local Pine City resident, who found artifacts such as musket flints in the soil. He returned to the site over the next three decades to explore it. In 1958, he found a book, Five Fur Traders in the North West, that contained the journal of John Sayer. The Pine City resident contacted the Minnesota Historical Society and explained what he had found. The Minnesota Historical Society performed some field testing in 1963 to determine the character of the site. In 1965 through 1967, a group of Hamline University students excavated the site and recovered hundreds of artifacts. The Minnesota Historical Society reconstructed the post in 1968 and 1969 and opened the site as a historic site in 1970. It was listed on the National Register of Historic Places in 1972.

The post has been reconstructed and furnished to represent the period from the winter of 1804–05. The museum is open in the summer, and costumed guides help interpret the site. The visitor center features exhibits about the post's history, a great room, fireplace and retail store.

The historic site has previously been known as Connor's Fur Post and the North West Company Fur Post. Its name was changed to the Snake River Fur Post in February 2018.
