= Robert Enstad =

American journalist

- Born: September 11, 1938; Pine City, Minnesota, United States
- Died: January 29, 2020 aged 81); Kenosha, Wisconsin, United States
- Occupations: Reporter and editor
- Notable work: Covering the Chicago Seven trial

Robert Enstad (September 11, 1938 – January 29, 2020) was an American journalist who covered the Chicago Seven trial.

== Early life ==
Enstad was born on September 11, 1938, in Pine City, Minnesota, to Carl and Austred Enstad, and was raised in River Falls, Wisconsin.

While in high school, he attended the 1956 Democratic National Convention in Chicago, which ultimately led him to pursue a career in journalism. He earned a bachelor's degree in journalism from Indiana University in 1961.

== Career ==
Enstad joined the Tribune in July 1961 as a neighborhood news reporter. From 1964 to 1967, he covered criminal courts. He then covered the federal building, where he covered the Chicago Seven trial, an assignment that lasted five months. He won the Peter Lisagor Award in 1983. He retired in 1998.

== Death and legacy ==
January 29, 2020, at the age of 81, Enstad died due to complications from Parkinson's disease. He died at Aurora Medical Center in Kenosha, Wisconsin. Through his estate, he left a legacy gift to a scholarship fund at his alma mater, University of Wisconsin–River Falls.

== Personal life ==
Enstad had a passion for cars and drove a Rolls-Royce and a Bentley. Over his life, he also owned numerous sailboats and moored them in Kenosha.
