= Pine City, Minnesota =

City in Minnesota, United States

Pine City Ne-zhingwaakokaag
- City
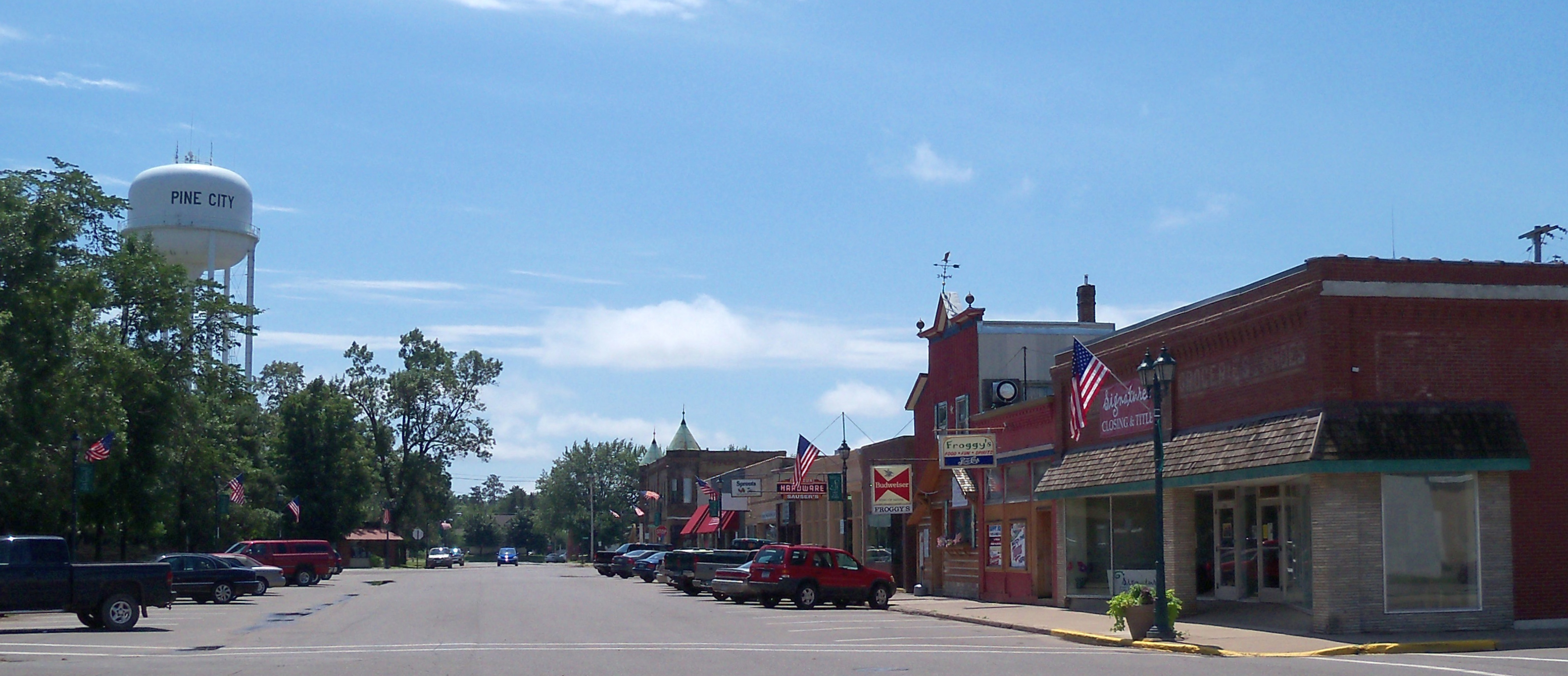
- Downtown Pine City

- Logo
- Nicknames: Pine, P.C.
- Motto: North. Nice and close.
- Location of Pine City within Pine County, Minnesota

- Location within the United States
- Coordinates: 45°50′12″N 92°58′05″W
- Country: United States
- State: Minnesota
- County: Pine
- Incorporated: February 14, 1881

Government
  - Mayor: Kent Bombard
  - City Council: Kyle Palmer, Gina Pettie, Dan Swanson, David Hill

Area
  - Total: 4.24 sq mi (10.98 km^{2})
  - Land: 3.83 sq mi (9.93 km^{2})
  - Water: 0.40 sq mi (1.04 km^{2})
- Elevation: 945 ft (288 m)

Population (2020)
  - Total: 3,130
  - Estimate (2024): 3,736 ▲
  - Density: 816.0/sq mi (315.07/km^{2})
  - Demonym: Pine Citian
- Time zone: UTC-6 (CST)
  - Summer (DST): UTC-5 (CDT)
- ZIP code: 55063
- Area code: 320
- FIPS code: 27-51064
- GNIS feature ID: 665301
- Website: pinecitymn.gov
- For additional travel information, see Pine City Wikivoyage

Pine City is a city in and the county seat of Pine County, in east central Minnesota, United States. The population was 3,130 at the 2020 census. Part of the city is on the Mille Lacs Indian Reservation. Founded as a railway town, it soon became a logging community and the surrounding lakes made it a resort town. Today, it is in part a commuter town for people working in the Minneapolis–Saint Paul metropolitan area.

== History ==
The Dakota Indians were the first in the area. With the Ojibwe expansion, the area became a mixture of the two. By the early 19th century, the area became predominantly Ojibwe. They trapped and hunted on the land and traded furs at the nearby trading posts. With the 1837 Treaty of St. Peters, dubbed the "White Pine Treaty", lumbering began in the area, but was limited by access to available waterways.

In the late 19th century, European settlers came to the Pine City area, which was still heavily forested with thick stands of white pine, some of the state's largest. When the railroad arrived in Pine City, a logging expansion began. Pine City prospered and grew to have everything it needed to serve residents, farmers, and the expanding lumber industry. It was platted in 1869 and incorporated in 1881.

When Buchanan County merged with Pine County in 1861, the county seat was consolidated to Pine City because it was already well-established. Because of its location on the far southern edge of Pine County, there have been attempts over the years to move the county seat to more central Hinckley or Sandstone.

In 2005, Pine City became the first city in rural America with an annual gay pride event, East-Central Minnesota Pride. A book capturing Pine City's history in vintage photos, part of the Images of America series, was published in 2010.

=== Timeline ===
- 1804 – European settlers arrived.
- 1837 – The Treaty of St. Peters, known as the “White Pine Treaty", initiated lumbering in the area.
- 1848 – The Ojibwe community of Chengwatana formally established as a village.
- 1856 – Chengwatana became Pine County's county seat.
- 1872 – Pine City became the county seat following a fire at the Chengwatana courthouse, prompting a new courthouse construction.
- 1881 – Pine City incorporated as a village west of Chengwatana due to the railroad's location, leading to Chengwatana's decline.
- 1894 – Robinson Park in Pine City served as a central staging area for relief efforts during the Great Hinckley Fire.
- 1903 – James Adam Bede delivered a notable speech at the Associated Press annual dinner in New York City.
- 1914 – A Minnesota Naval Militia Armory opened in Pine City with Governor Eberhart delivering a speech at the dedication ceremony in November.
- 1939 – Pine City built a yellow brick city hall, later relinquished to the county due to concerns over county seat status, now partly used by the city hall.
- 1952 – Lightning struck and destroyed the towered Romanesque Revival courthouse of 1886, prompting a new courthouse's construction, integrating the old city hall's architecture.
- 1954 – Pine County raised funds via bond issuance for a new courthouse, incorporating elements of the former city hall, marked with "Court House" over the north entrance.
- 1967 – Interstate 35's completion through Pine City enhanced regional connectivity.
- 1978 – The inaugural International Polkafest was hosted in Pine City.
- 1980 – Pine City's Jean Lindig Kessler was crowned Princess Kay of the Milky Way.
- 1992 – A 30-foot tall voyageur statue was erected on the north shore of the Snake River, near downtown Pine City.
- 2005 – Pine City hosted the first annual East-Central Minnesota Pride event, promoting community inclusivity.
- 2007 – A new courthouse was built on Pine City's northern edge following a failed attempt to split the county.
- 2009 – Pine City's Horizon Bank failed amid the 2008 financial crisis, with its assets acquired by Stearns Bank.
- 2010 – Lakeside Medical Center, Pine City's hospital, closed amidst a wave of rural hospital closures across the U.S.
- 2012 – The Pine City post office was renamed the "Master Sergeant Daniel L. Fedder Post Office" under H.R.3220.
- 2017 – Pine City's boys' basketball team gained national attention in the Wall Street Journal for their innovative three-point shooting strategy.
- 2019 - Governor Tim Walz hosted the annual deer hunting opener in Pine City, emphasizing the area's role in Minnesota's traditional hunting events.
- 2024 – Kent Bombard was appointed Pine City's first openly gay mayor, marking a significant moment in the city's political history and becoming the third openly gay mayor in Minnesota's municipal history.

== Geography ==
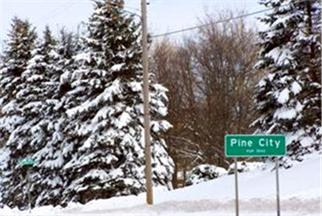
Winter scene with native pines in the background

According to the United States Census Bureau, the city has an area of 4.24 square miles (10.98 km^{2}), of which 3.77 square miles (9.76 km^{2}) is land and 0.47 square miles (1.22 km^{2}) is water.

=== Climate ===
Below is a table of average high and low temperatures throughout the year in Pine City. Of note, Pine City's early years included historic temperature extremes as it was the site of three record-setting cold temperatures:

- March 2, 1897 (-50 °F, March lowest temperature)
- November 25, 1945 (-47 °F, November lowest temperature)
- December 31, 1898 (-57 °F, December lowest temperature)

| Month | Jan | Feb | Mar | Apr | May | Jun | Jul | Aug | Sep | Oct | Nov | Dec |
|---|---|---|---|---|---|---|---|---|---|---|---|---|
| Avg high °F (°C) | 21 (−6) | 27 (−3) | 38 (3) | 54 (12) | 67 (19) | 75 (24) | 80 (27) | 78 (26) | 69 (21) | 55 (13) | 39 (4) | 25 (−4) |
| Avg low temperature °F (°C) | 4 (−16) | 17 (−8) | 30 (−1) | 40 (4) | 51 (11) | 56 (13) | 56 (13) | 53 (12) | 43 (6) | 32 (0) | 21 (−6) | 6 (−14) |

== Demographics ==
Historical population
| Census | Pop. | Note | %± |
|---|---|---|---|
| 1890 | 535 | | — |
| 1900 | 993 | | 85.6% |
| 1910 | 1,258 | | 26.7% |
| 1920 | 1,303 | | 3.6% |
| 1930 | 1,343 | | 3.1% |
| 1940 | 1,708 | | 27.2% |
| 1950 | 1,937 | | 13.4% |
| 1960 | 1,972 | | 1.8% |
| 1970 | 2,143 | | 8.7% |
| 1980 | 2,489 | | 16.1% |
| 1990 | 2,613 | | 5.0% |
| 2000 | 3,043 | | 16.5% |
| 2010 | 3,127 | | 2.8% |
| 2020 | 3,130 | | 0.1% |
| 2024 (est.) | 3,736 | | 19.4% |
U.S. Decennial Census; 2020 Census

=== 2020 census ===
As of the 2020 census, Pine City had a population of 3,130. The median age was 41.5 years. 21.4% of residents were under the age of 18 and 21.4% were 65 years of age or older. For every 100 females, there were 93.3 males, and for every 100 females age 18 and over, there were 90.8 males.

There were 1,383 households in Pine City, of which 24.4% had children under the age of 18 living in them. Of all households, 35.1% were married-couple households, 20.0% were households with a male householder and no spouse or partner present, and 34.3% were households with a female householder and no spouse or partner present. About 39.2% of all households were made up of individuals and 21.2% had someone living alone who was 65 years of age or older.

There were 1,512 housing units, of which 8.5% were vacant. The homeowner vacancy rate was 2.9% and the rental vacancy rate was 3.4%.

0.0% of residents lived in urban areas, while 100.0% lived in rural areas.

Racial composition as of the 2020 census
| Race | Number | Percent |
|---|---|---|
| White | 2,867 | 91.6% |
| Black or African American | 28 | 0.9% |
| American Indian and Alaska Native | 33 | 1.1% |
| Asian | 23 | 0.7% |
| Native Hawaiian and Other Pacific Islander | 1 | 0.0% |
| Some other race | 22 | 0.7% |
| Two or more races | 156 | 5.0% |
| Hispanic or Latino (of any race) | 68 | 2.2% |

=== 2010 census ===
The 2010 Census showed the Pine City area having some of the most same-sex coupled households of any rural area of the state.

=== 2000 census ===
As of the 2000 census, there were 3,043 residents, 1,222 households, and 734 families in the city. The population density was 1,076.3 inhabitants per square mile (415.6/km^{2}). There were 1,275 housing units at an average density of 451.0 per square mile (174.1/km^{2}).

There were 1,222 households, out of which 30.0% had children under the age of 18 living with them, 42.8% were married couples living together, 12.8% had a female householder with no husband present, and 39.9% were non-families. 34.7% of all households were made up of individuals, and 19.7% had someone living alone who was 65 years of age or older. The average household size was 2.38 and the average family size was 3.04.

In the city, the population was spread out, with 25.3% under the age of 18, 10.5% from 18 to 24, 25.0% from 25 to 44, 17.9% from 45 to 64, and 21.3% who were 65 years of age or older. The median age was 37 years. For every 100 females, there were 88.2 males. For every 100 females age 18 and over, there were 84.0 males.

The median income for a household in the city was $29,000 and the median income for a family was $37,000. Males had a median income of $30,000 versus $20,000 for females. The per capita income for the city was $16,000. About 10.8% of families and 15.0% of the population were below the poverty line, including 24.4% of those under age 18 and 14.1% of those age 65 or over.

=== Religion ===
Immaculate Conception Catholic Church

While the largest religion in Pine City is none at all, with over half of the community unchurched, it is home to various churches of varying denominations, including:

Pine City churches and their denominations
| Church | Denomination |
|---|---|
| Church of Jesus Christ of Latter-day Saints | The Church of Jesus Christ of Latter-day Saints |
| First Presbyterian Church | Presbyterian Church (USA) |
| Grace Baptist Church | Baptists |
| Hustletown Community Church | Nondenominational Christianity |
| Immaculate Conception Catholic Church | Catholic |
| Journey North Church | Gospel, Evangelicalism |
| Kingdom Hall – Jehovah's Witness | Jehovah's Witnesses |
| Living Hope Christian Center | Assemblies of God |
| Our Redeemer Lutheran Church | Evangelical Lutheran Church in America |
| Pine City Evangelical Free Church | Evangelical Free Church of America |
| Hands for Pine City | Lutheran Congregations in Mission for Christ |
| South Pine Baptist Church | Baptists |
| Zion Lutheran Church | Lutheran Church–Missouri Synod |

== Economy ==
Pine City Farmers' Market

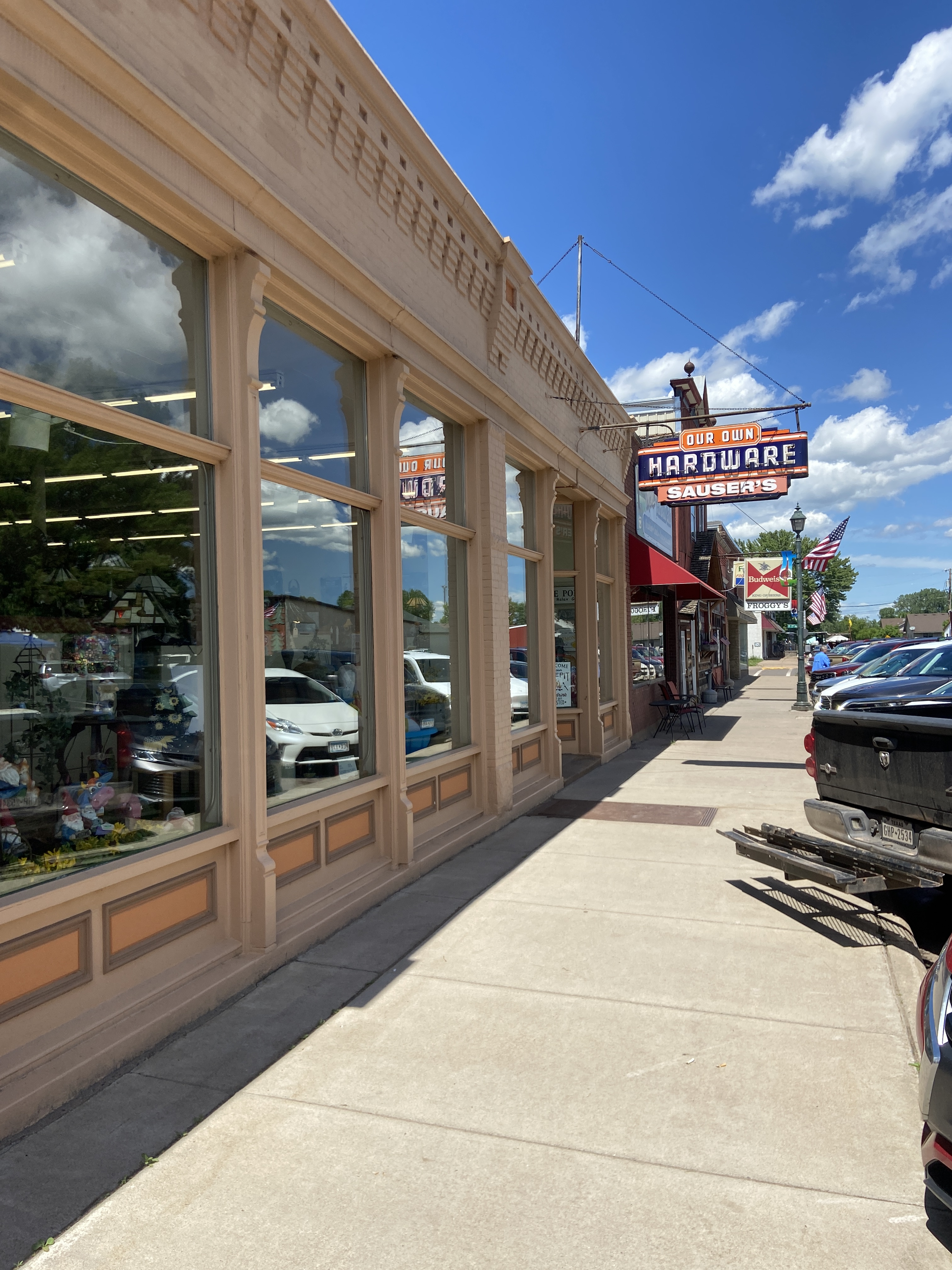
W.A Sauser Hardware

Left, Pine City Farmers' Market; right, W.A Sauser Hardware

MINPACK, Inc. is one of Pine City's largest employers, with 130 employees, and Atscott Manufacturing, with 100; both are headquartered in Pine City. Other large employers in the community include Walmart, Product Fabricators, Inc., Broekema Beltway, ISD 578, Therapeutic Services Agency, Pine County, Community Living Options and Lake Superior Laundry.

=== Downtown ===
The Pine City Scrapbooking Company in downtown Pine City was featured in 2017 on CBS News Sunday Morning.

== Arts and culture ==
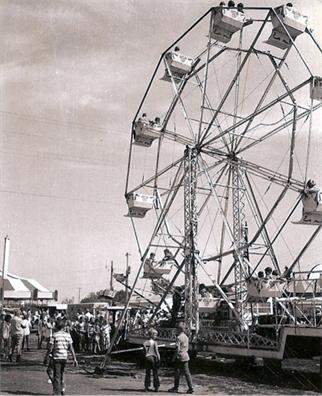
Historic photo of Pine County Fair

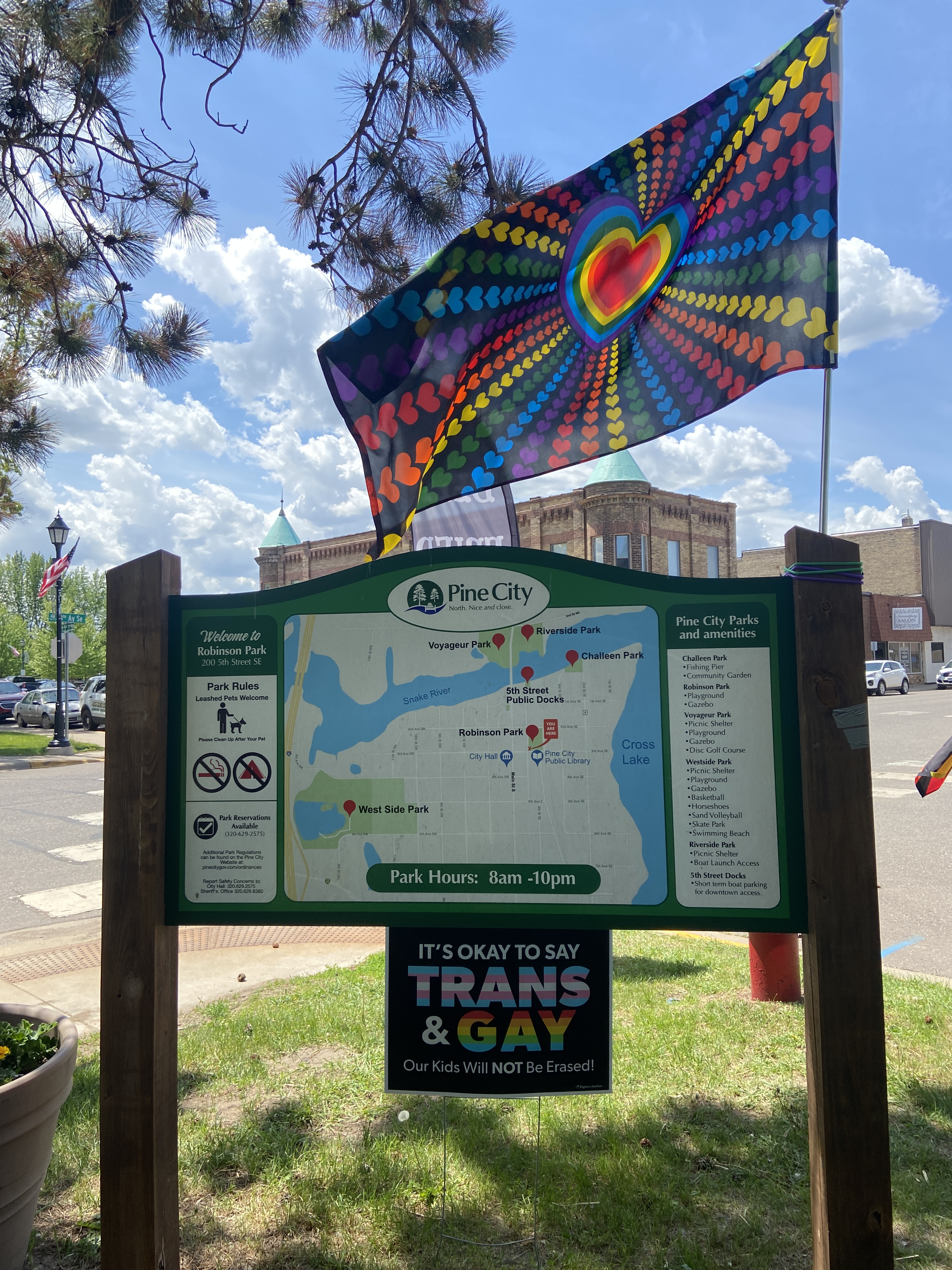
City map signage and "It's okay to say TRANS & GAY our kids will not be erased" sign below. A rainbow heart flag is above both signs.

Left, Historic photo of Pine County Fair; right, East Central Minnesota Pride

In 2009, Pine Center for the Arts opened. It is a regional arts center offering a variety of educational and performance-based programs relating to theater, music, visual art, literature, and dance. Classes and special events take place throughout the year. Community theater is active in Pine City: the Heritage Players perform semi-annually. The Pine City Arts Council sponsors a variety of annual events, most notably a free Friday night summer concert series held in Robinson Park and an art festival.

Promoted as "Minnesota’s Small-Town LGBTQ+ Pride", East Central Minnesota Pride's "Pride in the Park" celebration is held in Robinson Park. Starting in 2005, it was Minnesota's first small-town Pride celebration.

=== Major annual events ===
The following community and regional events are held in and around Pine City.

==== Spring, summer, and fall ====
- Highway 61 Film Festival
- International Polkafest
- Memorial Day Parade
- East-Central Minnesota Pride
- Art Fest in Robinson Park
- Pine County Fair
- Czech Booyah Festival, at Sokol Camp
- Pine City PRCA Championship Rodeo, Labor Day Weekend

==== Winter ====
- BB32 hockey tournament
- Ice fishing contests on area lakes
- Pine Technical and Community College Shooter's Association Gun Show

=== Places of interest ===
Roadside attraction of François the Voyageur in Voyageur Park

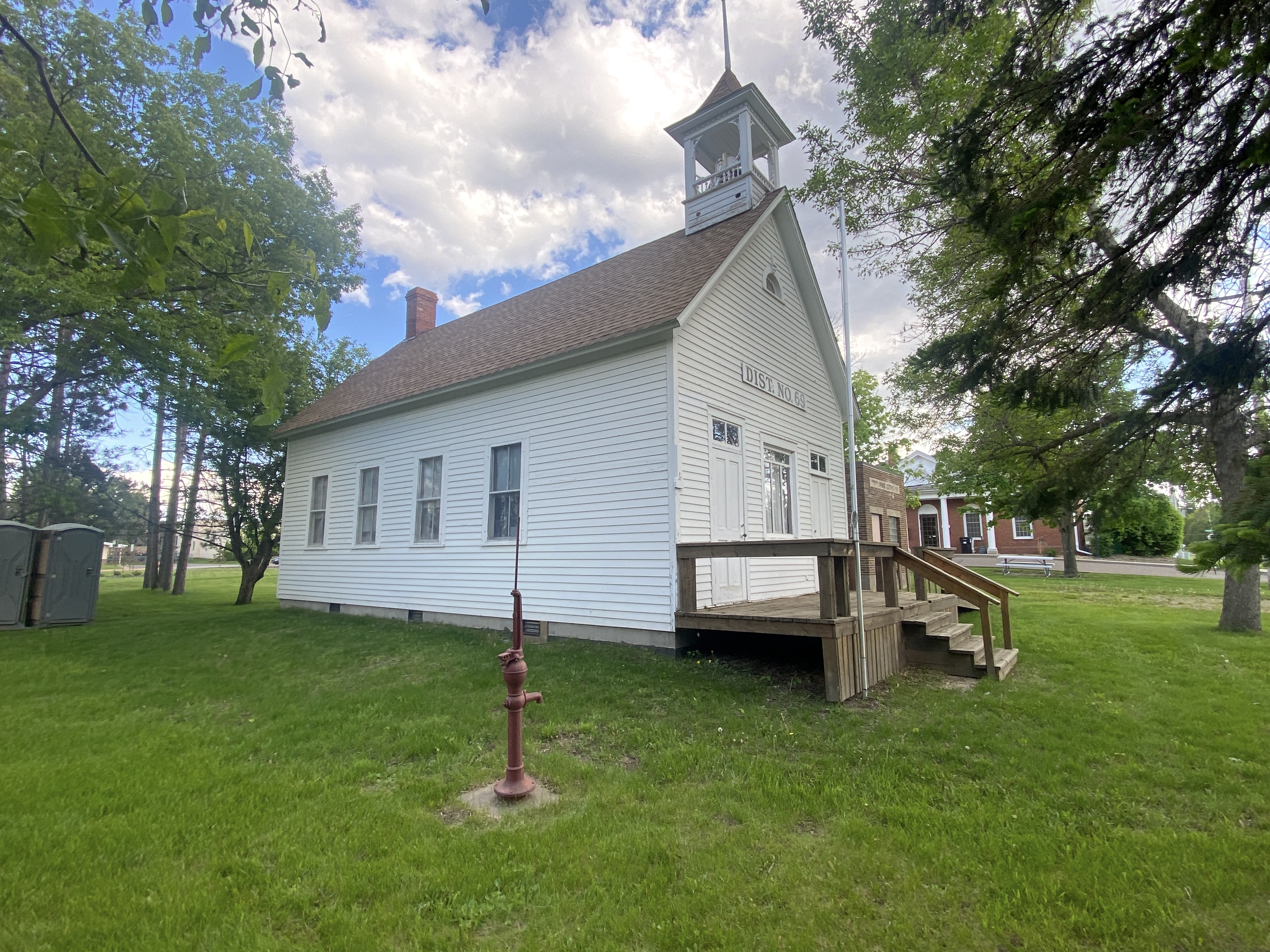
Rural School Museum, Built 1908

Left, François the Voyageur; right, Rural School Museum
- Pine Center for the Arts
- Rural School Dist. 69 Museum
- Snake River Fur Post
- Voyageur Statue, in Voyageur Park

== Parks and recreation ==
The city has 12 city parks, including one undeveloped park (Fawn Meadows Park); two passive parks, manicured but lacking recreational equipment (Meadow Ridge Park, Thomas Park); and eight active parks, with playgrounds and/or sports facilities, including:

- a community garden and a public fishing pier (Challeen Park)
- four ballfields (City Ballfields)
- three ice rinks (Hilltop Park)
- a public boat landing (Riverside Park)
- a performing stage (Robinson Park)
- a disc golf course (Voyageur Park)
- a skate park and a public beach (West Side Park)
- a Gulf War veteran memorial (Woodpecker Ridge Park)
- Pine City Country Club, a nine-hole public course that opened in 1971

== Sports ==
The Pine City Pirates compete in town team baseball in the Eastern Minny (now North) League, part of the Minnesota Baseball Association. Amateur baseball has been part of Pine City culture for years. The Pirates have had several state appearances, including 1950, 1952 B 2nd, 1953 B 3rd, 1961, and 1962. The team was defunct for a period before being revived in 2017.

== Government ==
Pine City is in Minnesota's 8th congressional district, represented for many years by Jim Oberstar and now by Pete Stauber. It is in State Senate District 11, represented by Jason Rarick. In the Minnesota House, Pine City is represented by Nathan Nelson. In 2019, Governor Tim Walz appointed Thom Petersen, of Pine City, to his cabinet as commissioner of the Minnesota Department of Agriculture.

A new courthouse and county offices were relocated from downtown to the north end of town in 2007. The former courthouse was renamed Pine Government Center in 2010 and now houses city government and other community organizations, including the chamber of commerce.

2023 mayor and city council
| Mayor | Kent Bombard | Term: 2026 |
| At-large | David Hill | Term: 2026 |
| At-large | Gina Pettie | Term: 2026 |
| At-large | Dan Swanson | Term: 2028 |
| At-large | Kyle Palmer | Term: 2028 |

=== City government ===
Pine City has a mayor-council government. Mayoral elections occur every two years. City council seats are contested every four years. Not all of the council members are elected in the same year, as the elections are staggered throughout odd-numbered years. The council consists of five members elected to represent the city as a whole (that is, at-large). Pine City's longest-serving mayor, and first woman mayor, was Jane Robbins.

== Education ==
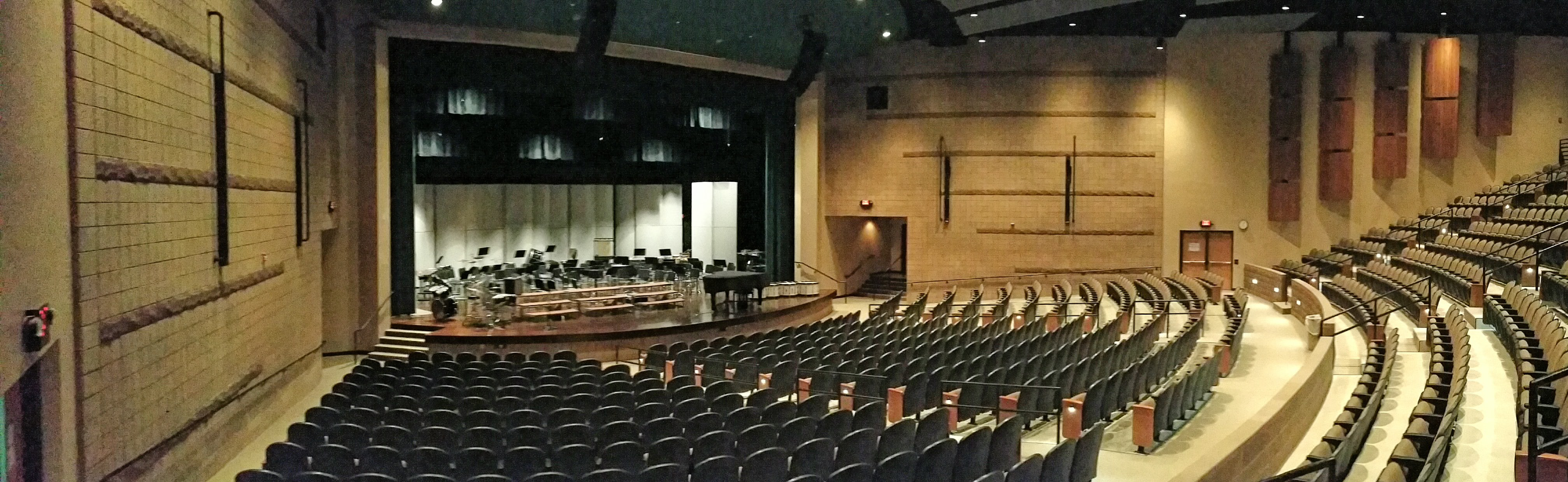
800-seat auditorium at Pine City High School

Pine City Public Schools (Independent School District #578) serve more than 1,600 students through one PK–6 elementary school (Pine City Elementary), Pine City High School, and the Pine City Area Learning Center. Pine City is also home to St. Mary's School (Catholic), which serves preschool and K–6 students.

Pine Technical and Community College is a two-year institution that is part of the Minnesota State Colleges and Universities system and offers technical and general education courses. Pine Tech's gunsmithing curriculum is one of the nation's only programs of its kind and draws students from throughout North America.

The Pine City Public Library is part of the East Central Regional Library. The ECRL holds nearly 400,000 volumes and serves over 65,000 cardholders in the region. Pine City is also home to the George E. Sausen Memorial Law Library, inside the Pine County Courthouse.

=== Elementary schools ===
- ECFE/Community Education: early childhood
- Pine City Elementary School: grades K-6
- St. Mary's School: pre-school

=== Junior high schools ===
- Pine City Junior High School: grades 7–9

=== Senior high schools ===
- Pine City Senior High School: grades 10–12
- Pine City Area Learning Center (ALC): grades 9 - 12
- Vision School

=== Colleges and universities ===
- Pine Technical and Community College

== Media ==
=== Newspapers ===
The major weekly newspaper in the area is the Pine City Pioneer, with a circulation of over 3,000. The Pioneer is owned by Kanabec Publishing and edited by Traci LeBrun. Papers from the Twin Cities are also commonly read.

=== Television ===
Pine City receives TV signals from the Twin Cities. Channels include Twin Cities Public Television, WCCO 4, KSTP-TV, KMSP-TV, KARE, WFTC, and KSTC-TV.

=== Radio ===
WCMP (AM) and WCMP-FM are the two local Pine City stations. The rest are "fringe" stations from surrounding areas. Pine City also receives radio stations from the Twin Cities, St. Cloud, and western Wisconsin areas.

| Station call sign | Frequency | Tower location | Format | Notable personalities |
|---|---|---|---|---|
| WCMP (AM) | 1350 AM | Pine City | Classic Hits | 'Ugly' Del Roberts |
| WCMP-FM | 100.9 FM | Pine City | Country (Cool Country) | Jim Erickson, Doug Fredlund |
| WCMP-FM | 106.5 FM | Pine City | Classic Hits | |
| KNOW-FM | 94.1 FM | Pine City | News (Minnesota Public Radio) | |
| WYSG | 96.3 FM | Hinckley | Christian music (LifeTalk Radio) | |
| W248AS | 97.5 FM | Hinckley | Adult Album Alternative (The Current) | |
| KSJN | 104.5 FM | Hinckley | Classical (Minnesota Public Radio) | |
| KBEK | 95.5 FM | Mora | Oldies and Variety (KBEK) | |
| KMKL (FM) | 90.3 FM | North Branch | Christian Contemporary (K-Love) | |
| WLUP | 105.3 FM | Cambridge | Soft adult contemporary (Love) | |
| WZEZ | 104.9 FM | Balsam Lake | Soft adult contemporary (EZ) | |
| WXCX | 105.7 FM | Siren | Classic Country (WILLIE 105.7) | |

== Infrastructure ==
Pine County Courthouse

=== Transportation ===
==== Mass transit ====
The Rush Line Corridor task force is studying the feasibility of rail service to serve area commuters. The Northern Lights Express passenger line has been funded and, once built, will serve area residents as well as those traveling between the Twin Cities and Twin Ports. For travel within the city, there is local taxi service.

==== Bus ====
Pine City is served by the Arrowhead Transit intra-county system. Arrowhead Transit provides local Dial-A-Ride bus service to residents in Pine City, MN and scheduled bus routes in Pine County. Arrowhead Transit provides scheduled route service to Sandstone, Hinckley, Sturgeon Lake, Cambridge, and Duluth.

An intercity bus service, Jefferson Lines, runs from Pine City to St. Paul or Duluth twice daily.

==== Major highways ====
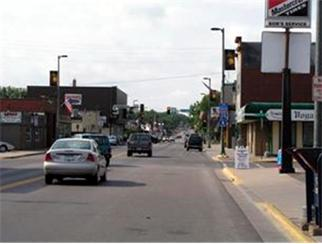
Main Street, formerly U.S. Route 61, now part of the I-35 Business Loop

Pine City is along Interstate 35 between the Twin Cities and Duluth. The St. Croix Scenic Byway also passes through Pine City. The major highways include:

- Interstate 35
- I-35 Business Loop
- Pine County Road 7
- Pine County Road 8
- Pine County Road 9
- Pine County Road 11
- Pine County Road 61
- Minnesota State Highway 361 Decommissioned {Now County 61}
- U.S. Route 61 Decommissioned {Now County 61}
- Minnesota State Highway 324 Decommissioned {Now County 7}

==== Rail ====
Pine City is on rail lines owned by BNSF Railway and leased by St. Croix Valley Railroad.

==== Trails ====
There is a planned, non-motorized trail connecting the Twin Cities-to-Twin Ports areas called the James L. Oberstar State Trail, awarded federal and state funding to connect the Sunrise Prairie Trail, near North Branch with the Willard Munger State Trail, near Hinckley.

=== Health ===
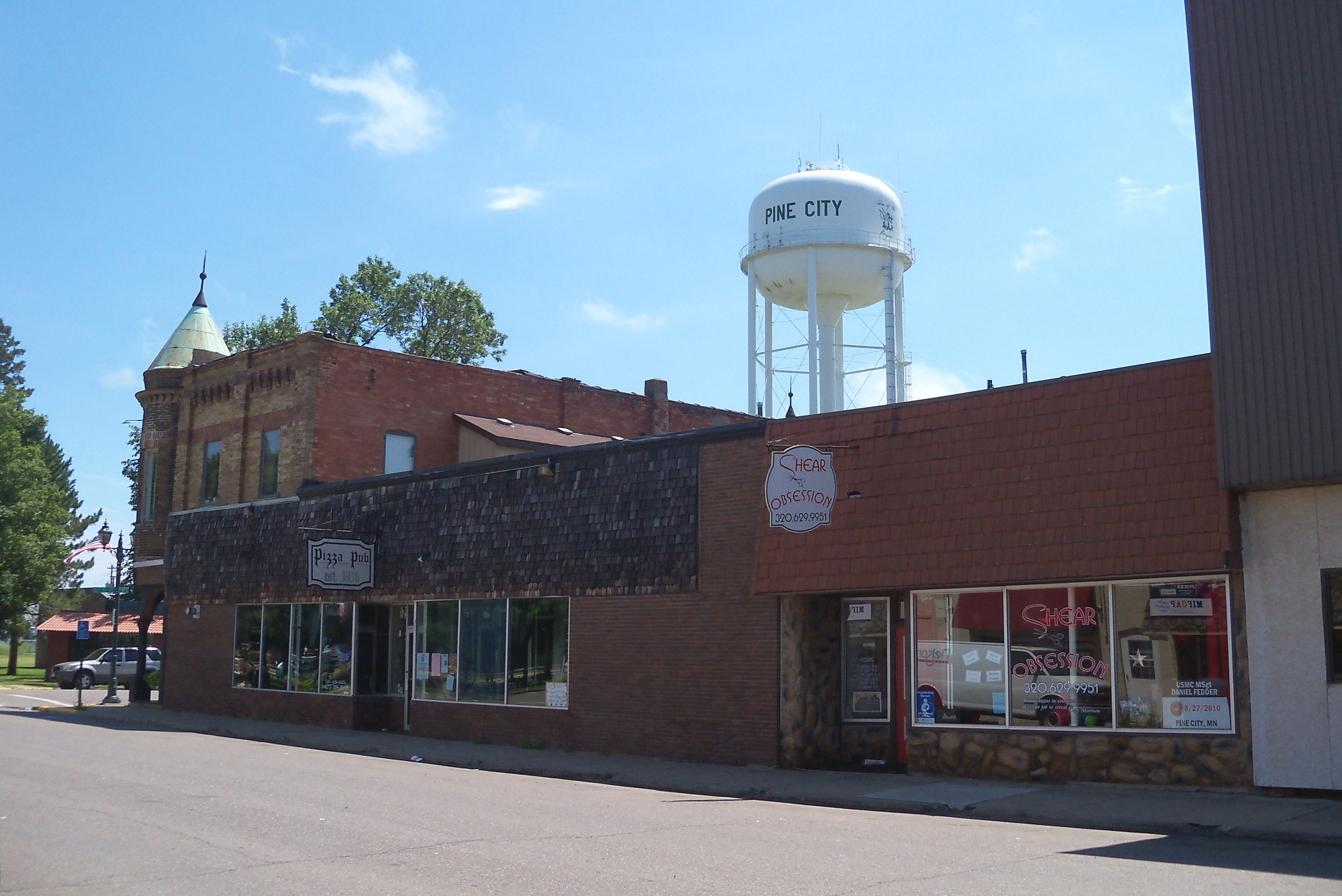
Downtown Pine City street scene with a 500,000-gallon water tower in the background, one of two in the city

Welia Health System has a clinic in Pine City. Welia provides a variety of health care services, including family medicine, obstetrics, orthopedics, physical therapy, occupational therapy, speech-language pathology, pediatric therapies, cardiac rehabilitation, and Urgency Services. Its facility encompasses 13,500 square feet (1,250 m^{2}), and a freestanding emergency facility opened in 2015.

=== Utilities ===
Utility providers are regulated monopolies. East Central Energy provides electrical utilities to the community and is a co-op member of Great River Energy. Minnesota Energy supplies gas and US Cable provides cable television. The city treats and distributes water and several local businesses provide garbage removal and recycling services.

=== Law enforcement ===
The city's law enforcement agency is the Pine County Sheriff's Office, through contract, with 39 full-time staff including 23 sworn officers. The sheriff's office has three K-9s. Besides performing routine patrol duties, the sheriff's office performs water, ATV, and snowmobile patrol, and search and rescue functions.

== Notable people ==
The following list includes those who were either born in, or who have resided (or presently reside) in Pine City:

- Ryan Anderson – professional musher
- James Bede – politician, US representative 1903–09
- John "Sparky" Birrenbach – activist
- Al Blake – professional wrestler a.k.a. Vladimir Petrov, or "the Russian Assassin"
- Ben Boo – politician, mayor of Duluth 1967–1975
- M. A. Brawley – politician, MN House 1876
- Louis Brouillard – priest involved in Catholic Church sex abuse cases
- Randall K. Burrows a.k.a. R.K. – politician, MN Senate 1874
- Roy Carl Carlson – politician, MN House 1975–76
- George I. Clem – politician, MN House 1947–48
- Robert Enstad – reporter and editor for Chicago Tribune
- Josh Froelich – competition shooter
- Frederick A. Hodge – politician, MN Senate 1895–98
- Jenna Jambeck – researcher
- Dorothy Swanda Jones – Alaskan politician
- Joe Karas – politician, MN House 1949–56
- Mesa Kincaid – radio personality, KQRS-FM, WCCO-FM and KSTP-FM
- Otto Kuss – professional wrestler
- Johnny Mold a.k.a. Jammin' – professional snocross racer
- Bob Mould – musician, Hüsker Dü, Sugar
- Adolph Munch – politician, MN House 1872
- Karla Nelsen – bodybuilder; 1993 AAU Ms. America
- Anna Dickie Olesen – politician, first woman to be nominated by a major party for the United States Senate
- L. C. Pedersen – politician, MN House 1919–22
- Thom Petersen – commissioner of the Minnesota Department of Agriculture
- Jason Rarick – politician, MN House 2015–19, MN Senate (present)
- Allison Rosati – news anchor, WMAQ-TV
- Jon Rydberg – four-time US Paralympic athlete, formerly ranked #1 among US players; NCAA wheelchair basketball national champion with the University of Texas-Arlington Movin' Mavs
- John Sayer – fur trader
- Joseph Edward Therrien a.k.a. Joe – politician, MN House 1923–30, 1943–46
- Glenn Truesdell – politician, MN House 1959–60
- Rube Walberg – professional baseball player, New York Giants, Philadelphia Athletics, Boston Red Sox
- Jeff Warner a.k.a. J.W. Storm – professional wrestler
- Steve Zahn – actor

== Fictional references ==
- Craig Wright, writer of HBO's Six Feet Under, set a series of plays in fictitious "Pine City, Minnesota." These have been performed across the United States: The Pavilion, Orange Flower Water, Molly's Delicious, Melissa Arctic and Grace, which takes place in Florida, but is about people who come from Pine City.
- Dean L. Hovey wrote a series of seven fictional mysteries set in the Pine City area: Where Evil Hides, Hooker, Unforgettable, Undeveloped, The Deacon's Demise, and Family Trees. Family Trees: A Pine County Mystery won the 2018 Northeastern Minnesota Book Award (NEMBA) for fiction for its depiction of the region's values, settings, and social issues.
- In Drop Dead Gorgeous, starring Kirsten Dunst, a "Miss Pine City" character is portrayed by an actual Pine Citian, Amy Olson.
