= Adolph Munch =

American politician and businessman

Member of the Minnesota House of Representatives
- In office 1872–1873

Personal details
- Born: 1829 Prussia
- Died: November 26, 1901 (aged 71–72)

Adolph Munch (1829 – November 26, 1901) was an American politician and businessman.

Born in Prussia, Munch was a merchant in Pine City, Minnesota. He served in the Minnesota House of Representatives in 1872.
