= Jenna Jambeck =

American environmental engineer and academic (born 1974)

Jenna Romness Jambeck
- Born: 1974 (age 51–52); Pine City, Minnesota
- Education: University of Florida
- Scientific career
- Workplaces: University of Georgia
- Thesis: The disposal of CCA-treated wood in simulated landfills : potential impacts (2004)

Jenna Jambeck (born 1974) an American environmental engineer who is the Georgia Athletic Association Distinguished Professor of Environmental Engineering at the University of Georgia. Her research considers plastic pollution and efforts to address plastic waste. In 2022, she was awarded a MacArthur Fellowship.

== Early life and education ==
Jambeck grew up in Pine City, Minnesota and graduated from Pine City High School. Jambeck was an undergraduate student at the University of Florida. She majored in environmental engineering, before starting a masters, then doctorate. During her doctoral research on CCA-treated wood, Jambeck worked alongside Debra Reinhardt and Helena Solo-Gabriele. In 2004, she started a United States Environmental Protection Agency postdoctoral fellowship in Florida.

== Research and career ==
Jambeck was made an assistant professor at the University of Georgia in 2005. She was promoted to associate professor in 2015, and became the Georgia Athletic Association Distinguished Professor of Environmental Engineering in 2020.

In 2001, Jambeck started working on marine debris, the solid plastic waste that accumulates in the shorelines of waterways. In 2014, Jambeck went on an ocean expedition with fourteen women scientists to better understand ocean plastics. The mission, "eXXpedition", looked to advance understanding of microplastics and their impact on environmental and human health.

Jambeck created debris tracker, an app that allows members of the public to monitor plastic pollution. The app, which started to track marine debris, was supported by the National Oceanic and Atmospheric Administration. Based on data collected by this app, in 2015 Jambeck estimated that there was over 8 million metric tons of plastic entering the ocean every year.

Jambeck was made a National Geographic Fellow in 2018. She looked to created standardized methods to characterize the factors which cause plastic waste leakage in the environment. These frameworks should provide strategies to prevent the potentially harmful side effects of plastic pollution. Alongside her work on plastic waste, Jambeck is interested in creating a circular economy. She developed the Circularity Assessment Protocol, CAP, which includes plastics manufacturers, users and people who are involved with waste management. The CAP was used by people in Miami to develop regulations to keep debris out of the water.

In 2022, Jambeck was awarded a MacArthur Fellowship.

== Selected publications ==
- Jenna R Jambeck; Roland Geyer; Chris Wilcox; Theodore R Siegler; Miriam Perryman; Anthony Andrady; Ramani Narayan; Kara Lavender Law (1 February 2015). "Marine pollution. Plastic waste inputs from land into the ocean". Science. 347 (6223): 768–771. Bibcode:2015Sci...347..768J. doi:10.1126/SCIENCE.1260352. ISSN 0036-8075. PMID 25678662.
- Roland Geyer; Jenna R Jambeck; Kara Lavender Law (19 July 2017). "Production, use, and fate of all plastics ever made". Science Advances. 3 (7) e1700782. doi:10.1126/SCIADV.1700782. ISSN 2375-2548. PMC 5517107. PMID 28776036.
- Amy L Brooks; Shunli Wang; Jenna R. Jambeck (20 June 2018). "The Chinese import ban and its impact on global plastic waste trade". Science Advances. 4 (6) eaat0131. doi:10.1126/SCIADV.AAT0131. ISSN 2375-2548. PMC 6010324. PMID 29938223.
