= Highway 61 Film Festival =

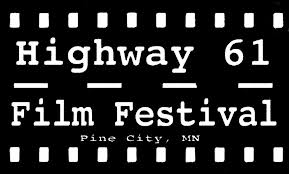
- Location: Pine City, Minnesota, United States
- Language: International
- Website: http://www.highway61filmfestival.org

The Highway 61 Film Festival is an annual film festival held in Pine City, Minnesota. The festival was established in 2011 to show movies representing excellence in filmmaking, particularly those rare independent films and documentaries by both noted and new filmmakers, that do not receive mainstream distribution. The name of the festival comes from and highlights U.S. Route 61, especially U.S. Route 61 in Minnesota.

The Highway 61 Film Festival is sponsored by a non-profit organization, Pine Center for the Arts, and is funded by businesses, community groups and individuals, plus ticket sales for the various film sessions. The festival is headed by a committee of Pine City area film enthusiasts, writers, directors, and creative professionals.

The 2011 and 2012 Highway 61 Film Festivals were held over the span of three days, Friday through Sunday, and featured many independent shorts and features. They were shown at the Pine Technical & Community College Auditorium as well as at a supper club and events center called Beach Rocks on the north shore of Pokegama Lake. In 2011, the festival showed films taken by Shane Bauer prior to his detainment. In 2012, the Minneapolis–Saint Paul International Film Festival founder, Al Milgrom, presented some of his works and photographer Wing Young Huie attended to see some of his inspired works projected on buildings in an accompanying event called "Photos on Buildings" nearby.

== Official selections ==
=== 2014 ===
- 216 Months
- Int. Café–Night
- Little Things

=== 2013 ===
- Tales of the Road: Highway 61
- Les Esclaves
- Useful. Valid. True
- Sled Dogs to St. Paul
- Honor Among Thieves
- Maze
- Our Killing Time
- Two Stiffs
- Rocket Surgeons
- Deadly Love
- The Healing Musical
- Iter Ad Terram Promissionis
- Coffea – The Coffee Fairy
- Syren
- The American Road
- The Information Thief
- Aakhir (At Last)
- Not Like the Commercials
- The Panhandler
- McMeta
- Small Steps
- Lima Syndrome
- The Elevator
- For Ashley
- Another Saturday Night
- Problem Solving the Republic
- Sunrise's Favorite Son
- Escape from Schwartz's Bakery
- Keeper
- Misiek and the Bloody Monitor
- Hairdo or DIE: The First Cut
- The Giant Spider

=== 2012 ===
- Wild Bill's Run
- The Long Push
- Incidental
- We Juke Up In Here!
- Labor Day
- Steele Vengeance
- In Harm's Way
- The Paper Jam
- The Heart of a Book
- Burmese Python
- Adventure Under the Sea
- Dangerous Days
- Glory and Death: Amundsen and Scott's Race to the South Pole
- The Highway Walkers
- Restraint
- The Interview
- Memorial Day
- Trade for Magic
- Goin’ With the Flo
- Shattered Glass
- Foreign Love
- Case #377
- Snow White
- The Dream
- The Cabin
- House of Ghosts

=== 2011 ===
- What If?
- Boundary Waters
- Five Bucks Til Friday
- Stories Next Door
- Lumber Jill
- Songs to Enemies and Deserts
- Recreation
- All Over the Walls
- True Story of Peter Pan
- Night Surf
- Cocainine
- Your Mother's a Hunt
- Hunting Buddies
- Rhythm Sticks
- Spaceman from Space
- Whistle
- Underwater Ocean Visit
- Welcome to America: 50 states in 50 days
- Ink Blots
- Out of Character
- Games Men Play
- Cento
- Sun Gods
- Masquerade
- Payback Time
- Harold Crumb
- Lambent Fuse
- Love Notes
- Stitches
- Bloodshed Love
- Roadside Assistance
- Dope Sick
- Birthmarked for Death
- Ghost from the Machine
- The Missing Frame
- Attack of the Moon Zombies
- Some Fangs
- Potpourri
