= M. A. Brawley =

American politician

Mark A. Brawley (1 July 1849, Cleves, Ohio – 15 June 1922, Frankfort, Kansas) was an American physician and briefly a Minnesota politician.

Brawley enlisted at the age of 14 as a Union Army soldier and served in the division of Lew Wallace. After the war he went to Farmers College at College Hill, Cincinnati and in 1872 he graduated from Ohio Medical College. He practiced medicine first in Minnesota, where he lived in Pine City. In 1876, he served in the Minnesota House of Representatives. Later, he briefly had a practice in Topeka, Kansas. In 1884, he married Anna Chandler Cassidy (1853–1937) and located to her home town of Frankfort, Kansas, where they raised two children and remained for the rest of their lives.
