= Wing Young Huie =

American photographer (born 1955)

Wing Young Huie is an American photographer born in Duluth, Minnesota in 1955.

He attended the University of Minnesota, earning his B.A. in journalism in 1979. He became a full-time professional photographer in 1989. He is known for innovative photography projects which engage the community such as his projects in the Frogtown neighborhood of Saint Paul and along the Lake Street corridor in Minneapolis. He would speak to occupants in the neighborhood, and ask to take their picture. He would then display the photographs and quotes in the same neighborhood, in sizes from small enough to fit in a storefront window to large enough to drape the side of the empty Sears building.

His work has been collected in The University Project, Volume 1, The University Project, Volume 2, Looking for Asian America: An Ethnocentric Tour, Lake Street USA, and Frogtown: Photographs and Conversations in an Urban Neighborhood.

Huie's photographs have been exhibited in Chicago, Minneapolis, St. Paul, New York, Westport, Rotterdam, Budapest, and West Palm Beach.

Wing Young Huie's fellowships, grants, and awards include the Minnesota Historical Society Research Grant (1993); Rivers Merging, Asian American Renaissance, Minnesota Artists Exhibition Program (1994); Minnesota State Arts Board Cultural Collaborations Grant (1994, 1998); McKnight Photography Fellowship (1994, 1999); Bush Artist Fellowship (1996); Minnesota 2000 Photo Documentary Project (1997); Forecast Exhibition Grant (1994, 1999); Star Tribune "Artist of the Year" (2000); Committee on Urban Environment Award (2000); US Bank Sally Irvine Ordway Vision Award (2001); St. Paul Companies Leadership Initiatives in Neighborhoods (LIN) Award (2001); City Pages Best Book by a Local Author (2002); and the Emerging Leaders Spotlight Award from the Humphrey Institute of Public Affairs (2006). He was named as the McKnight Foundation Distinguished Artist in 2018.
