= Karla Nelsen =

American bodybuilder

Karla Nelsen (born December 9, 1965) is a former amateur female bodybuilder (fbb) from the United States.

Nelsen grew up in Pine City, Minnesota. That is where she became involved in the fledgling sport of women's bodybuilding. She won the AAU Ms. America title in 1993 and the NABBA Ms. USA title in 1994.

At a height of 183 cm (6.00 ft) and an off-season peak weight of 107 kg (236 lb), Karla was well known for her mixed wrestling videos which featured her in videos where she wrestled much smaller men most of the time in her own videos that she sold. But she also did work for Bill Wick, Premier Productions, Builtmore Productions, Flexible Productions, Leather & Lace, AnnDees Amazons (former Montenegro Videos ) and Mass Muscle where the men were not that small. She also wrestled women (competitive, semi-competitive, and submission style) where she was undefeated until her confrontation against Nicole Bass, renowned to be "the world's largest fbb" (186 cm (6.10 ft) and 108 kg (238 lb)), who was the only one to dominate her in a competitive match produced by Mass Muscle.

Karla was married to Al Blake, the American professional wrestler known as Vladimir Petrov.

== Contest history ==
- 1990 NPC Junior USA - 5th (HW)
- 1992 NPC USA Championship - 10th (HW)
- 1993 AAU Ms America - 1st (tall & overall)
- 1994 NABBA Ms. USA Nationals - 1st
- 1994 NABBA Ms. Universe - 4th (Tall)
