= Roy Carl Carlson =

American politician

Roy Carl Carlson (May 4, 1937 – April 11, 2011) was an American educator and politician.

Born in Minneapolis, Minnesota, he graduated from Robbinsdale High School, in Robbinsdale, Minnesota, and served in the United States Army. He went to Minneapolis Vocational School where he learned carpentry and was an apprentice. Carlson received his bachelor's and master's degrees in industrial education from University of Wisconsin–Stout in 1968 and taught industrial education in high school. He also went to Bethel University. He served in the Minnesota House of Representatives as a Democrat in 1975 from Pine City, Minnesota.
