= The Labour Pioneer =

British political magazine

The Labour Pioneer was a monthly socialist periodical issued from Cardiff, Wales between February 1900 and November 1902. It was an organ of the Cardiff Socialist Party and the Cardiff Trades Council. It carried the by-line 'Organ of the Cardiff Socialist Party'. The Cardiff Socialist Party had been formed in 1900 by the fusion of the local Cardiff branches of the Independent Labour Party and the Social Democratic Federation. The editorial board of The Labour Pioneer contained various representatives of local trade councils and trades unions. However whilst officially being a publication of the local Labour Representation Committee, The Labour Pioneer functioned as an unofficial Independent Labour Party organ.

The Labour Pioneer was edited by T. J. Hart, although jointly with A. E. Ellery for the first issue and with Harold Snelling between January 1901 and July 1901. T. J. Hart was the president of the Cardiff Trades Council and secretary of the Cardiff Labour Representation Committee.
