= KBEK =

- Mora, Minnesota; United States
- Broadcast area: East-central Minnesota; Northwest Wisconsin
- Frequency: 95.5 MHz
- Branding: Nice 95.5

Programming
- Format: Adult contemporary

Ownership
- Owner: Alan R. Quarnstrom; (Q Media Properties, LLC)

History
- First air date: May 12, 1995

Technical information
- Licensing authority: FCC
- Facility ID: 31613
- Class: C3
- ERP: 25,000 watts
- HAAT: 100 meters (328 feet)
- Transmitter coordinates: 45°44′33″N 93°22′48″W

Links
- Public license information: Public file; LMS
- Webcast: Listen Live
- Website: kbek.com

KBEK (95.5 FM; "Nice 95.5") is a radio station licensed to Mora, Minnesota, and serving east-central Minnesota and northwestern Wisconsin. The station is owned by Alan R. Quarnstrom, through licensee Q Media Properties, LLC. KBEK previously aired an eclectic mix of music with specialty shows every night of the week, all hosted by personalities who live in the station's broadcast area.

== History ==
The station was assigned the KBEK call letters by the Federal Communications Commission on September 20, 1989, and was granted its license to cover on May 22, 1995. Back then it played an eclectic mix of pop and rock. It was formerly licensed to John Godfrey, Colleen McKinney's late husband, who died of cancer in 2004. The format later changed to oldies in the 2010s.

Due to economic factors, KBEK went up for sale in September 2011. It originally announced that it would close on September 30, 2011 (which was subsequently pushed to December 31, 2011) before McKinney announced on December 22 that KBEK had been sold and will remain on the air.

KBEK went off the air April 1, 2014.

KBEK turned its transmitter back on October 26, 2014 and resumed regular broadcasting shortly thereafter. McKinney sold KBEK to Genesis Technology Communication LLC effective December 1, 2017 at a price of $200,000.

In October 2020, it was announced that Alan R. Quarnstrom's Q Media Properties, LLC would acquire KBEK from Genesis Technology Communication LLC. Q Media would begin operating KBEK on November 1, 2020 via a local marketing agreement.

Soon after Q Media Properties began operating KBEK on November 1, KBEK began simulcasting soon-to-be sister station WCMP in Pine City, which broadcasts a classic hits format branded as "Highway 106.5." The simulcast would be temporary, as KBEK promoted a format change would be coming soon.

On November 16, 2020, KBEK changed to adult contemporary, branded as "Nice 95.5".

The purchase by Q Media Properties, at a price of $295,000, was consummated on October 8, 2021.
