= Joseph Edward Therrien =

American politician

Joseph Edward Therrien (March 17, 1879 – October 7, 1954) was an American businessman and politician.

Born in Canada, he moved with his parents to Two Harbors, Minnesota in 1882 where he studied law. In 1908, he moved to Pine City, Minnesota. He owned Pine City Abstract Company in Pine City, Minnesota. He served in Lake County, Minnesota government and was county auditor for Pine County, Minnesota. Therrien also served as probate judge for Pine County, Minnesota 1917-1920. He served in the Minnesota House of Representatives 1923-1931 and 1943-1947.
