= Tommy Ryman =

American stand-up comedian (born 1983)

- Born: Thomas J. Ryman; March 17, 1983 (age 43); Minneapolis, Minnesota, U.S.

Comedy career
- Years active: 2005–present
- Medium: Stand up
- Genre: Observational storytelling
- Website: tommyryman.com

Tommy Ryman (born March 17, 1983) is an American stand-up comedian who was a semifinalist on Season 8 of the TV show Last Comic Standing. After getting his start in the Minnesota comedy scene, Paste magazine named him one of 12 Great Stand-Up Comedians from the Midwest. In 2015, he won Best of Midwest at Gilda's Laugh Fest. In 2018, he was invited to perform at the Great American Comedy Festival at Johnny Carson Theater, first performing there in 2010. In 2016, he was named "Best Local Standup Comedian" by City Pages. He refrains from off-color humor, instead relying on observational comedy, sarcasm, and satire; in doing so, he gained recognition in 2018 on VidAngel's Dry Bar Comedy Season 3 series entitled Activated.

== Personal ==
Tommy's 2013 marriage was officiated by comedian and actor Rob Little. He resides in Minnesota. His mother is folk singer-songwriter Barb Ryman. His early comedic inspiration came from the late Mitch Hedberg.

== Discography ==
- Bath Time With Tommy Ryman (2011) by Stand Up! Records
- Having the Time of My Life (2018) by Stand Up! Records

== TV/Film/Podcast ==
Year	Title	Role
2013	Probably Science	Himself
2014	Last Comic Standing	Himself
2016	Jackie Kashian's The Dork Forest	Himself
2018	Activated on VidAngel's Dry Bar Comedy	Himself
