= Barney Therrien =

American gridiron football player

Profile
- Positions: Defensive tackle, Guard

Personal information
- Born: c. 1940 (age 85–86)
- Listed height: 6 ft 2 in (1.88 m)
- Listed weight: 220 lb (100 kg)

Career information
- College: Washington

Career history
- 1961–1963: BC Lions
- 1964–1967: Edmonton Eskimos

Barney Therrien (born c. 1940) is a Canadian former professional football player who played for the Edmonton Eskimos and BC Lions. He played college football at the University of Washington.
