= WCMP (AM) =

- Pine City, Minnesota; United States
- Broadcast area: East-central Minnesota and Northwest Wisconsin
- Frequency: 1350 kHz
- Branding: Anthem Country

Programming
- Format: Classic country
- Affiliations: Fox News Radio; Packers Radio Network

Ownership
- Owner: Alan R. Quarnstrom; (Q Media Properties, LLC)
- Sister stations: KBEK, WCMP-FM

History
- First air date: June 13, 1957

Technical information
- Licensing authority: FCC
- Facility ID: 52622
- Class: D
- Power: 1,000 watts day 52 watts night
- Transmitter coordinates: 45°49′10″N 92°59′45″W
- Translator: 106.5 W293DA (Pine City)

Links
- Public license information: Public file; LMS
- Webcast: Listen Live
- Website: wcmpradio.com

WCMP (1350 kHz) is an AM radio station in Pine City, Minnesota. It has a classic country format, and broadcasts 24 hours a day. The station first signed on in 1957. It started out as a Full Service MOR station broadcasting only through the day hours, but transformed into Full Service AC in the mid-1980s.

It is owned by Alan R. Quarnstrom, through licensee Q Media Properties, and has studios at 15429 Pokegama Lake Rd. This facility is shared with sister station WCMP-FM. Its signal can be heard with in a six-county area.

On September 16, 2016, Red Rock Radio announced that it would sell WCMP and WCMP-FM to Q Media Properties; the sale was completed on November 30, 2016 at a purchase price of $300,000. On April 17, 2017, WCMP changed their format from adult standards to classic hits, branded as "Pine Hits 106". Since then, WCMP quietly rebranded as "Highway 106.5" with no change in format.

On November 16, 2020, WCMP flipped to classic country, branded as "Anthem Country".
