= Roy E. Carlson =

American football and baseball coach (1918–1995)

Biographical details
- Born: June 24, 1918; Chicago, Illinois, U.S.
- Died: November 14, 1995 (aged 77)

Coaching career (HC unless noted)

Football
- 1959–1961: Washington State (assistant)
- 1962–1971: Pacific Lutheran

Baseball
- 1963–1965: Pacific Lutheran

Head coaching record
- Overall: 37–47–6 (football); 16–38 (baseball)

Accomplishments and honors

Championships
- Football; 1 Evergreen (1964); 2 NWC (1969, 1971)

Roy Eric Carlson (June 24, 1918 – November 14, 1995) was an American college football and college baseball coach. After serving as an assistant coach at Washington State University from 1959 to 1961, he served as the head football coach at Pacific Lutheran University from 1962 to 1971. He also served as the school's baseball coach from 1963 to 1965.

== Head coaching record ==
=== Football ===
| Year | Team | Overall | Conference | Standing | Bowl/playoffs |
|---|---|---|---|---|---|
Pacific Lutheran Lutes (Evergreen Conference) (1962–1964)
| 1962 | Pacific Lutheran | 2–5–2 | 1–4–2 | 5th | |
| 1963 | Pacific Lutheran | 1–8 | 1–6 | 6th | |
| 1964 | Pacific Lutheran | 6–3 | 5–2 | 1st | |
Pacific Lutheran Lutes (Northwest Conference) (1965–1972)
| 1965 | Pacific Lutheran | 4–5 | 0–0 | NA | |
| 1966 | Pacific Lutheran | 2–5–2 | 1–3–2 | 5th | |
| 1967 | Pacific Lutheran | 2–7 | 2–4 | T–4th | |
| 1968 | Pacific Lutheran | 3–4–2 | 2–2–2 | 4th | |
| 1969 | Pacific Lutheran | 6–3 | 4–2 | T–1st | |
| 1970 | Pacific Lutheran | 6–3 | 4–2 | 2nd | |
| 1971 | Pacific Lutheran | 5–4 | 4–2 | T–1st | |
| Pacific Lutheran: | | 37–47–6 | 24–27–6 | | |
| Total: | | 37–46–6 | | | |
National championship Conference title Conference division title or championship game berth
