= Randall K. Burrows =

American politician and businessman

Randall K. Burrows (c. 1829−?), nicknamed R. K., was an American politician and businessman.

Born in Connecticut, Burrows lived in Pine City, Minnesota and was a manufacturer. He served in the Minnesota Senate in 1874.
