= WCMP-FM =

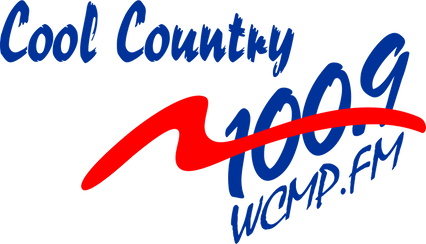
- Pine City, Minnesota; United States
- Broadcast area: East-central Minnesota and Northwest Wisconsin
- Frequency: 100.9 MHz
- Branding: Cool Country 100.9 FM

Programming
- Format: Country
- Affiliations: Fox News Radio; Minnesota Twins; Minnesota Vikings

Ownership
- Owner: Alan R. Quarnstrom; (Q Media Properties, LLC)
- Sister stations: WCMP

History
- First air date: October 15, 1977
- Call sign meaning: Cambridge Mora Pine City

Technical information
- Licensing authority: FCC
- Facility ID: 52621
- Class: C3
- ERP: 25,000 watts
- HAAT: 84 meters (276 feet)
- Transmitter coordinates: 45°54′07″N 92°57′25″W

Links
- Public license information: Public file; LMS
- Webcast: Listen live
- Website: www.wcmpradio.com

WCMP-FM (100.9 MHz, "Cool Country 100.9 FM") is an American radio station licensed to serve Pine City, Minnesota. It airs a country music format.

It is owned by Alan R. Quarnstrom, through licensee Q Media Properties, and has studios at 15429 Pokegama Lake Rd. This facility is shared with sister station WCMP.

The station was assigned the WCMP-FM call letters by the Federal Communications Commission on August 9, 1979, originally at 92.1 FM.

== History ==
WCMP-FM was granted as a new FM station to WCMP Broadcasting Co. of Pine City in 1977. The following year, Broadcasting reported that the station had been authorized by the Federal Communications Commission to begin program operation on 92.1 MHz. The authorization, dated January 3, 1978, listed WCMP-FM with an effective radiated power of 3 kW and an antenna height of 290 feet above average terrain.

In 1992, the FCC approved the transfer of WCMP and WCMP-FM from WCMP Broadcasting Co. Inc. to Pine City Broadcasting Co. Inc. for $650,000. At the time of the sale, WCMP-FM was described as a contemporary country station operating on 92.1 MHz with 3 kW and an antenna height of 300 feet above average terrain. By 1993, FMedia! listed WCMP-FM as using the "92 Country" identifier.

WCMP-FM later moved from 92.1 MHz to 100.9 MHz because of a broader FCC channel change involving several FM stations in Minnesota and Wisconsin. In MM Docket No. 96-105, the FCC changed Pine City's FM allocation from 92.1 MHz to 100.9 MHz and modified WCMP-FM's license to match the new frequency. The change was adopted January 3, 1997, released January 10, 1997, and became effective February 24, 1997.

In 2001, Quarnstrom Media Group LLC purchased WCMP and WCMP-FM from Pine City Broadcasting Co. Inc. for $1.25 million. Broadcasting & Cable listed WCMP-FM at the time as a 25 kW station on 100.9 MHz carrying a contemporary country, sports and news format. The FCC approved the transfer of WCMP-FM's license from Pine City Broadcasting Company, Inc. to Quarnstrom Media Group, LLC on August 23, 2001.

In 2007, Red Rock Radio agreed to buy WCMP and WCMP-FM from Quarnstrom Media for $1.6 million. The FCC application for the transaction listed Quarnstrom Media Group, LLC as the seller and Red Rock Radio Corp. as the buyer of WCMP-FM.

In September 2016, NorthPine reported that Q Media Properties was buying WCMP and "Cool Country" WCMP-FM for $300,000 from Red Rock Radio, returning the stations to Quarnstrom ownership after the 2001–2007 period. The FCC approved the transfer of WCMP-FM's license from Red Rock Radio Corp. to Q Media Properties, LLC on November 16, 2016.
