= Pine City Pioneer =

- Type: Weekly newspaper (Thurs.)
- Owner: Northstar Media Group
- Publisher: Jeff Andres
- Editor: T.A. LeBrun
- Founded: 1885
- Language: American English
- Headquarters: 405 2nd Avenue SEPine City, Minnesota 55063 United States
- City: Pine City
- Country: United States
- Circulation: 2,100 (as of 2025)
- ISSN: 0892-2012
- OCLC number: 1762401
- Website: pinecitymn.com

The Pine City Pioneer is an American, English language newspaper and the largest of two newspapers in Pine County, Minnesota. It is headquartered in Pine City and is published weekly on Thursday.

== History ==
The Pine City Pioneer was founded in 1897 as the Pine Poker and has had the following names over the years:

- Pine City Pioneer (1968–current)
- Pine Poker-Pioneer (1940–1968)
- Pine County Pioneer (1885–1840)
- Pine Poker (1897–1940)

Other newspapers in Pine County include:

- "North Pine County News"
