= International Polkafest =

The International Polkafest is an annual music festival devoted to polka. The festival draws about a dozen bands and was held for a time and until 2008 at the Ironworld Discovery Center in Chisholm, Minnesota. The first Polkafest was held in Pine City, Minnesota in 1978 at the Pine County Fairgrounds and it was held there most often throughout the years until it outgrew the space. The event was the brainchild of Florian Chmielewski, and attracts thousands of people each year.

An International Polkafest was held in Kitzbühel, Austria in 1978.
