= List of California Community Colleges =

This is a list of California Community Colleges in order of the year founded, made up of 116 credit-granting colleges and two noncredit colleges within the California Community Colleges system, as well as surrounding districts of the system.

== List of colleges ==
Name	Location	Founded	Enrollment (2023–2024)	Nickname (athletic conference)
Chaffey College	Rancho Cucamonga (main); Chino; Fontana	1883	33,531	Panthers (IEC)
Santa Barbara City College	Santa Barbara	1909	26,594	Vaqueros (WSC)
Fresno City College	Fresno (main); West Fresno (center)	1910	39,262	Rams (CVC)
Bakersfield College	Bakersfield (main); Delano; Shafter	1913	46,475	Renegades (WSC)
Fullerton College	Fullerton	1913	26,360	Hornets (OEC)
San Diego City College	San Diego	1914	21,512	Knights (PCAC)
San Diego College of Continuing Education (Note: Non-credit institution)	San Diego	1914	24,235	(Note: School has no varsity athletics teams.)
Citrus College	Glendora	1915	16,280	Fighting Owls (WSC)
Santa Ana College	Santa Ana	1915	66,510	Dons (OEC)
Riverside City College	Riverside	1916	30,576	Tigers (OEC)
Sacramento City College	Sacramento (main); Davis; West Sacramento	1916	30,100	Panthers (B8C)
Santa Rosa Junior College	Santa Rosa (main); Petaluma; Windsor; Forestville	1918	32,157	Bears Cubs (B8C)
Gavilan College	Gilroy (main); Hollister; San José; San Martin	1919	10,864	Rams (CC)
Allan Hancock College	Santa Maria (main); Lompoc; Santa Ynez	1920	19,669	Bulldogs (WSC)
Hartnell College	Salinas (main); King City; Castroville; Soledad	1920	15,079	Panthers (CC)
Modesto Junior College	Modesto	1921	25,270	Pirates (B8C)
San José City College	San José (main); Milpitas	1921	14,997	Jaguars (CC)
College of San Mateo	San Mateo	1922	14,961	Bulldogs (CC)
Taft College	Taft	1922	7,800	Cougars (CVC)
Pasadena City College	Pasadena	1924	40,586	Lancers (SCC)
Lassen Community College	Susanville	1925	3,338	Cougars
Los Angeles Trade–Technical College	Los Angeles	1925	22,889	Beavers (SCC)
Ventura College	Ventura	1925	18,677	Pirates (WSC)
College of Marin	Kentfield; Novato	1926	9,142	Mariners (BVC)
College of the Sequoias	Visalia (main); Hanford (center); Tulare (center)	1926	18,261	Giants (CVC)
Reedley College	Reedley	1926	15,608	Tigers (CVC)
San Bernardino Valley College	San Bernardino	1926	19,996	Wolverines (IEC)
Compton College	Compton	1927	7,366	Coyotes (SCC)
Glendale Community College	Glendale	1927	24,105	Vaqueros (WSC)
Long Beach City College	Long Beach	1927	38,516	Vikings (SCC)
Porterville College	Porterville	1927	7,175	Pirates (CVC)
Yuba College	Marysville (main); Yuba City	1927	8,990	Forty-Niners (BVC)
Antelope Valley College	Lancaster (main); Palmdale	1929	17,407	Marauders (WSC)
Los Angeles City College	Los Angeles	1929	30,589	Cubs (SCC)
Santa Monica College	Santa Monica (main); Los Angeles; Malibu	1929	38,555	Corsairs (WSC)
Coalinga College	Coalinga	1932	5,439	Falcons (CVC)
MiraCosta College	Oceanside (main); Cardiff; Carlsbad	1934	22,085	Spartans (PCAC)
City College of San Francisco	San Francisco	1935	44,020	Rams (CC)
San Joaquin Delta College	Stockton (main); Mountain House; Lodi; Manteca	1935	26,688	Mustangs (B8C)
Sierra College	Rocklin (main); Grass Valley; Truckee; Roseville	1936	26,034	Wolverines (B8C)
Napa Valley College	Napa (main); St. Helena	1942	6,402	The Storm (BVC)
East Los Angeles College	Monterey Park	1945	65,832	Huskies (SCC)
Solano Community College	Fairfield (main); Vallejo; Vacaville; Travis Air Force Base	1945	12,781	Falcons (BVC)
Contra Costa College	San Pablo	1946	10,390	Comets (BVC)
Mt. San Antonio College	Walnut	1946	74,655	Mounties (SCC)
Palomar College	San Marcos (main); Escondido; Fallbrook; San Diego; Camp Pendleton; Ramona	1946	29,175	Comets (PCAC)
El Camino College	Alondra Park	1947	32,839	Warriors (SCC)
Los Angeles Pierce College	Woodland Hills	1947	28,494	Brahmas (WSC)
Monterey Peninsula College	Monterey (main); Seaside; Marina	1947	11,555	Lobos (CC)
Orange Coast College	Costa Mesa	1947	23,728	Pirates (OEC)
Palo Verde College	Blythe	1947	5,988	Pirates (IEC)
Diablo Valley College	Pleasant Hill; San Ramon	1949	24,572	Vikings (B8C)
Los Angeles Harbor College	Los Angeles	1949	17,511	Seahawks (SCC)
Los Angeles Valley College	Los Angeles	1949	30,225	Monarchs (WSC)
Shasta College	Redding (main); Burney; Weaverville; Red Bluff; Redding	1950	13,475	Knights (GVC)
Laney College	Oakland	1953	16,439	Eagles (BVC)
Merritt College	Oakland	1954	12,092	Panthers (BVC)
American River College	Sacramento (main); Mather; McClellan	1955	47,186	Beavers (B8C)
Cerritos College	Norwalk	1955	33,222	Falcons (SCC)
College of the Siskiyous	Weed (main); Yreka	1957	3,681	Eagles (GVC)
Foothill College	Los Altos Hills (main); Sunnyvale	1957	25,638	Owls (CC)
College of the Desert	Palm Desert (main); Desert Hot Springs; Indio; Thermal; Palm Springs	1958	18,164	Roadrunners (IEC)
Barstow Community College	Barstow (main); Fort Irwin	1959	5,677	Vikings (IEC)
Cabrillo College	Aptos (main); Watsonville	1959	15,655	Seahawks (CC)
Rio Hondo College	Whittier (main); Santa Fe Springs; El Monte; Pico Rivera	1960	34,599	Roadrunners (SCC)
Chabot College	Hayward	1961	19,105	Gladiators (CC)
Grossmont College	El Cajon	1961	19,767	Griffins (PCAC)
Southwestern College	Chula Vista (main); Coronado; National City; San Diego	1961	28,654	Jaguars (PCAC)
Victor Valley College	Victorville (main); Apple Valley; Hesperia	1961	22,412	Rams (IEC)
Imperial Valley College	Imperial	1962	12,174	Desert Valley Warriors (PCAC)
Merced College	Merced (main); Los Banos	1962	18,428	Blue Devils (CVC)
Mt. San Jacinto College	San Jacinto; Menifee; Banning; Temecula	1962	27,306	Eagles (IEC)
Cuesta College	San Luis Obispo (main); Paso Robles; Arroyo Grande	1963	17,327	Cougars (WSC)
San Diego Mesa College	San Diego	1963	30,247	Olympians (PCAC)
West Valley College	Saratoga	1963	14,037	Vikings (CC)
College of the Redwoods	Eureka (main); Crescent City; Hoopa	1964	6,935	Corsairs (GVC)
Las Positas College	Livermore	1964	11,560	Hawks (CC)
Golden West College	Huntington Beach	1965	18,887	Rustlers (OEC)
Ohlone College	Fremont; Newark	1965	15,607	Renegades (CC)
Copper Mountain College	Joshua Tree (main); Twentynine Palms	2001	2,515	Fighting Cacti (IEC)
Cypress College	Cypress	1966	19,829	Chargers (OEC)
Butte College	Oroville (main); Chico; Orland	1967	14,231	Roadrunners (GVC)
De Anza College	Cupertino	1967	28,969	Mountain Lions (CC)
Los Angeles Southwest College	Los Angeles	1967	11,701	Cougars (SCC)
Moorpark College	Moorpark	1967	21,811	Raiders (WSC)
Cañada College	Redwood City	1968	10,975	Colts (CC)
College of Alameda	Alameda	1968	10,410	Cougars (BVC)
Columbia College	Sonora	1968	3,924	Claim Jumpers (CVC)
Feather River College	Quincy	1968	2,899	Golden Eagles (CVC)
Saddleback College	Mission Viejo	1968	40,810	Bobcats (OEC)
College of the Canyons	Santa Clarita: Valencia (main); Canyon Country	1969	39,360	Cougars (WSC)
San Diego Miramar College	San Diego	1969	23,095	Jets (PCAC)
Skyline College	San Bruno	1969	17,083	Trojans (CC)
West Los Angeles College	Culver City	1969	20,451	Wildcats (WSC)
Cosumnes River College	Sacramento (main); Elk Grove	1970	23,122	Hawks (B8C)
Crafton Hills College	Yucaipa	1972	9,385	Roadrunner (IEC)
Cerro Coso Community College	Ridgecrest (main); Bishop; Mammoth Lakes; Tehachapi; Edwards Air Force Base; Lake Isabella	1973	9,367	Coyotes (IEC)
Mendocino College	Ukiah (main); Lakeport; Willits; Fort Bragg	1973	7,793	Eagles (BVC)
North Orange Continuing Education	Anaheim	1973	16,718	
Berkeley City College	Berkeley	1974	11,436	Knights (GVC)
Los Medanos College	Pittsburg (main); Brentwood	1974	11,933	Mustang (BVC)
Evergreen Valley College	San José	1975	15,699	Hawks (CC)
Lake Tahoe Community College	South Lake Tahoe	1975	10,322	Coyotes (GVC)
Los Angeles Mission College	Los Angeles	1975	21,811	Eagles (WSC)
Mission College	Santa Clara	1975	12,124	Saints (CC)
Oxnard College	Oxnard	1975	11,827	Condors (WSC)
Coastline College	Garden Grove; Newport Beach; Westminster; Fountain Valley	1976	18,230	Dolphins
Cuyamaca College	El Cajon	1978	13,483	Coyotes (PCAC)
Irvine Valley College	Irvine	1979	22,900	Lasers (OEC)
Santiago Canyon College	Orange	1985	31,301	Hawks (OEC)
Norco College	Norco	1991	17,740	Mustangs (IEC)
Lemoore College	Lemoore	2002	6,519	Golden Eagles (CVC)
Folsom Lake College	Folsom (main); Placerville; Rancho Cordova	2004	16,825	Falcons (B8C)
Clovis Community College	Northeast Fresno (main); Clovis	2007	15,527	Clovis Crush (CVC)
Woodland Community College	Woodland (main); Clearlake; Williams	2008	6,784	Eagles (BVC)
Moreno Valley College	Moreno Valley (main); Riverside	2010	17,336	Lions
Calbright College	Online	2018	5,028	
Madera Community College	Madera (main); Oakhurst (center)	2020	10,914	Mountain Lions (CVC)

== List of community college districts ==
This is a list of California community college districts, made up of 73 districts that serve 12 million students per year.

Name	Region	Counties served	Colleges in district
Allan Hancock Joint Community College District	South Central	San Luis Obispo; Santa Barbara; Ventura	Allan Hancock College
Antelope Valley Community College District	South Central	Kern; Los Angeles	Antelope Valley College
Barstow Community College District	Inland Empire	San Bernardino	Barstow Community College
Butte-Glenn Community College District	Northern	Butte; Glenn	Butte College
Cabrillo Community College District	Bay Area	Monterey; San Benito; Santa Cruz	Cabrillo College
Calbright Online Community College District	Online		Calbright College
Cerritos Community College District	Southern	Los Angeles	Cerritos College
Chabot–Las Positas Community College District	Bay Area	Alameda	Chabot College; Las Positas College
Chaffey Community College District	Southern	San Bernardino	Chaffey College
Citrus Community College District	Southern	Los Angeles	Citrus College
Coast Community College District	Southern	Orange	Coastline Community College; Golden West College; Orange Coast College
Compton Community College District	Southern	Los Angeles	Compton College
Contra Costa Community College District	Bay Area	Contra Costa	Contra Costa College; Diablo Valley College; Los Medanos College
Copper Mountain Community College District	Southern	San Bernardino	Copper Mountain College
Desert Community College District	Southern	Riverside; San Bernardino	College of the Desert
El Camino Community College District	Southern	Los Angeles	El Camino College
Feather River Community College District	Northern	Plumas	Feather River College
Foothill–De Anza Community College District	Bay Area	Santa Clara	De Anza College; Foothill College
Gavilan Community College District	Central	San Benito; Santa Clara	Gavilan College
Glendale Community College District	Southern	Los Angeles	Glendale Community College
Grossmont–Cuyamaca Community College District	Southern	San Diego	Cuyamaca College; Grossmont College
Hartnell Community College District	Bay Area	Monterey; San Benito	Hartnell College
Imperial Community College District	Southern	Imperial	Imperial Valley College
Kern Community College District	Central	Inyo; Kern; Mono; San Bernardino; Tulare	Bakersfield College; Cerro Coso Community College; Porterville College
Lake Tahoe Community College District	Central	El Dorado	Lake Tahoe Community College
Lassen Community College District	Northern	Lassen; Modoc; Mono; Sierra	Lassen Community College
Long Beach Community College District	Southern	Los Angeles	Long Beach City College
Los Angeles Community College District	Southern	Los Angeles	East Los Angeles College; Los Angeles City College; Los Angeles Harbor College; Los Angeles Mission College; Los Angeles Pierce College; Los Angeles Southwest College; Los Angeles Trade–Technical College; Los Angeles Valley College; West Los Angeles College
Los Rios Community College District	South Central	El Dorado; Placer; Sacramento; Yolo	American River College; Consumnes River College; Folsom Lake College; Sacramento City College
Marin Community College District	Bay Area	Marin	College of Marin
Mendocino–Lake Community College District	Northern	Lake; Mendocino	Mendocino College
Merced Community College District	Central	Fresno; Merced	Merced College
MiraCosta Community College District	Southern	San Diego	MiraCosta College
Monterey Peninsula Community College District	Bay Area	Monterey	Monterey Peninsula College
Mt. San Antonio Community College District	Southern	Los Angeles	Mt. San Antonio College
Mt. San Jacinto Community College District	Southern	Riverside	Mt. San Jacinto College
Napa Valley Community College District	Northern	Napa; Sonoma	Napa Valley College
North Orange County Community College District	Southern	Los Angeles	Cypress College; Fullerton College
Ohlone Community College District	Bay Area	Alameda	Ohlone College
Palo Verde Community College District	Southern	Riverside; San Bernardino	Palo Verde College
Palomar Community College District	Southern	San Diego	Palomar College
Pasadena Area Community College District	Southern	Los Angeles	Pasadena City College
Peralta Community College District	Bay Area	Alameda	College of Alameda; Berkeley City College; Laney College; Merritt College
Rancho Santiago Community College District	Southern	Orange	Santa Ana College; Santiago Canyon College
Redwoods Community College District	Northern	Del Norte; Humboldt; Mendocino; Trinity	College of the Redwoods
Rio Hondo Community College District	Southern	Los Angeles	Rio Hondo College
Riverside Community College District	Southern	Riverside	Moreno Valley College; Norco College; Riverside City College
San Bernardino Community College District	Southern	Riverside; San Bernardino	Crafton Hills College; San Bernardino Valley College
San Diego Community College District	Southern	San Diego	San Diego City College; San Diego Mesa College; San Diego Miramar College
San Francisco Community College District	Bay Area	San Francisco	City College of San Francisco
San Joaquin Delta Community College District	Central	San Joaquin; Calaveras; Sacramento; Alameda; Solano	San Joaquin Delta College
San Jose-Evergreen Community College District	Bay Area	Santa Clara	Evergreen Valley College; San Jose City College
San Luis Obispo County Community College District	Southern	San Luis Obispo; Monterey	Cuesta College
San Mateo County Community College District	Bay Area	San Mateo	Cañada College; College of San Mateo; Skyline College
Santa Barbara Community College District	Southern	Santa Barbara	Santa Barbara City College
Santa Clarita Community College District	Southern	Los Angeles	College of the Canyons
Santa Monica Community College District	Southern	Los Angeles	Santa Monica College
Sequoias Community College District	Central	King; Tulare	College of the Sequoias
Shasta–Tehama–Trinity Community College District	Northern	Shasta; Tehama; Trinity; Lassen; Modoc; Humboldt	Shasta College
Sierra Joint Community College District	Northern	El Dorado; Nevada; Placer; Sacramento	Sierra College
Siskiyou Joint Community College District	Northern	Siskiyou	College of the Siskiyous
Solano County Community College District	Northern	Solano; Yolo	Solano Community College
Sonoma County Junior Community College District	Northern	Sonoma; Marin; Mendocino	Santa Rosa Junior College
South Orange County Community College District	Southern	Orange	Irvine Valley College; Saddleback College
Southwestern Community College District	Southern	San Diego	Southwestern College
State Center Community College District	Central	Fresno; Madera; Kings; Tulare	Clovis Community College; Fresno City College; Madera Community College; Reedley College
Ventura County Community College District	Southern	Ventura	Moorpark College; Oxnard College; Ventura College
Victor Valley Community College District	Southern	Los Angeles; Sant Bernardino	Victor Valley College
West Hills Community College District	Central	Madera; Kings; Fresno; San Benito; Monterey	Coalinga College; Lemoore College
West Kern Community College District	Southern	Kern	Taft College
West Valley–Mission Community College District	Bay Area	Santa Clara	Mission College; West Valley College
Yosemite Community College District	Central	Calaveras; Merced; Stanislaus; Tuolumne; San Joaquin; Santa Clara	Columbia College; Modesto Junior College
Yuba Community College District	Northern	Yuba; Yolo; Sutter; Butte; Colusa; Glenn; Lake; Placer	Woodland Community College; Yuba College

== See also ==
- California Community Colleges System topics
