= Golden Valley Conference =

Junior college athletic conference in Northern California

The Golden Valley Conference (GVC) is a junior college athletic conference affiliated with the California Community College Athletic Association (CCCAA). Its members are located in the Northern California.

The conference was formed in 1950 and began operation in 1951. Its six initial members were Grant Technical College—now known as American River College, Napa Junior College—now known as Napa Valley College, Placer Junior College—now known as Sierra College, Shasta College, Vallejo Junior College—now known as Solano Community College, and Yuba College. Wyman E. Olson of Grant Grant Technical College was appointed commissioner of the conference at an organizational meeting in the spring of 1950.

== Yearly football standings ==
1951 Golden Valley Conference football standings
	Conf.					Overall
Team	W		L		T	W		L		T
Yuba $	5	–	0	–	0	8	–	1	–	1
Napa	4	–	1	–	0	6	–	1	–	0
Grant Tech	3	–	2	–	0	6	–	3	–	0
Vallejo	2	–	3	–	0	5	–	5	–	0
Placer	1	–	4	–	0	3	–	6	–	0
Shasta	0	–	5	–	0	1	–	6	–	1
$ – Conference champion

1952 Golden Valley Conference football standings
	Conf.					Overall
Team	W		L		T	W		L		T
Vallejo $	4	–	0	–	1	5	–	3	–	2
Yuba	4	–	1	–	0	6	–	3	–	0
Shasta	3	–	1	–	1	6	–	2	–	1
Napa	2	–	3	–	0	3	–	6	–	0
Grant Tech	1	–	4	–	0	2	–	7	–	0
Placer	0	–	5	–	0	0	–	8	–	0
$ – Conference champion

1953 Golden Valley Conference football standings
	Conf.					Overall
Team	W		L		T	W		L		T
Yuba +	4	–	1	–	0	10	–	1	–	0
Shasta +	4	–	1	–	0	6	–	3	–	0
Vallejo +	4	–	1	–	0	5	–	4	–	1
Grant Tech	1	–	4	–	0	3	–	6	–	0
Napa	1	–	4	–	0	3	–	6	–	0
Sierra	1	–	4	–	0	3	–	6	–	0
+ – Conference co-champions

1954 Golden Valley Conference football standings
	Conf.					Overall
Team	W		L		T	W		L		T
Vallejo $	5	–	0	–	0	6	–	2	–	1
Yuba	4	–	1	–	0	7	–	2	–	0
Shasta	3	–	2	–	0	6	–	3	–	0
Napa	2	–	3	–	0	3	–	5	–	0
Sierra	1	–	4	–	0	2	–	5	–	1
Grant Tech	0	–	5	–	0	1	–	7	–	1
$ – Conference champion

1955 Golden Valley Conference football standings
	Conf.					Overall
Team	W		L		T	W		L		T
Yuba $	6	–	0	–	0	10	–	1	–	0
Shasta	4	–	1	–	1	6	–	3	–	1
Vallejo	4	–	2	–	0	6	–	4	–	0
Napa	3	–	3	–	0	6	–	3	–	0
American River	1	–	4	–	1	2	–	5	–	1
Marin	1	–	5	–	0	1	–	7	–	0
Sierra	0	–	4	–	2	0	–	7	–	2
$ – Conference champion

1956 Golden Valley Conference football standings
	Conf.					Overall
Team	W		L		T	W		L		T
Yuba +	4	–	1	–	0	6	–	2	–	0
Marin +	4	–	1	–	0	5	–	3	–	0
American River	3	–	2	–	0	4	–	4	–	0
Shasta	3	–	2	–	0	5	–	5	–	0
Sierra	1	–	4	–	0	1	–	7	–	0
Napa	0	–	5	–	0	0	–	8	–	0
+ – Conference co-champions

1957 Golden Valley Conference football standings
	Conf.					Overall
Team	W		L		T	W		L		T
Yuba $	4	–	0	–	0	6	–	3	–	0
Shasta	3	–	1	–	0	8	–	1	–	0
Marin	2	–	2	–	0	4	–	4	–	0
American River	1	–	3	–	0	4	–	5	–	0
Sierra	0	–	4	–	0	0	–	7	–	0
$ – Conference champion

1958 Golden Valley Conference football standings
	Conf.					Overall
Team	W		L		T	W		L		T
Yuba $	5	–	0	–	0	8	–	2	–	0
Sierra	4	–	1	–	0	7	–	1	–	1
Shasta	3	–	2	–	0	6	–	4	–	0
Napa	2	–	3	–	0	3	–	4	–	0
American River	1	–	4	–	0	1	–	8	–	0
Marin	0	–	5	–	0	1	–	8	–	0
$ – Conference champion

1959 Golden Valley Conference football standings
	Conf.					Overall
Team	W		L		T	W		L		T
Sierra +	4	–	0	–	1	?	–	?	–	?
Yuba +	4	–	0	–	1	?	–	?	–	?
Shasta	2	–	3	–	0	?	–	?	–	?
Napa	2	–	3	–	0	?	–	?	–	?
American River	2	–	3	–	0	?	–	?	–	?
Marin	0	–	5	–	0	?	–	?	–	?
+ – Conference co-champions

1960 Golden Valley Conference football standings
	Conf.					Overall
Team	W		L		T	W		L		T
American River $	5	–	0	–	0	8	–	1	–	0
Yuba	3	–	2	–	0	4	–	5	–	0
Sierra	3	–	2	–	0	3	–	6	–	0
Shasta	2	–	3	–	0	4	–	5	–	0
Napa	2	–	3	–	0	4	–	4	–	0
Marin	0	–	5	–	0	0	–	8	–	0
$ – Conference champion

1961 Golden Valley Conference football standings
	Conf.					Overall
Team	W		L		T	W		L		T
Sierra $	3	–	0	–	2	?	–	?	–	?
Marin	3	–	2	–	0	?	–	?	–	?
Shasta	2	–	2	–	1	?	–	?	–	?
Yuba	2	–	2	–	1	?	–	?	–	?
Napa	2	–	3	–	0	?	–	?	–	?
American River	1	–	4	–	0	?	–	?	–	?
$ – Conference champion

1962 Golden Valley Conference football standings
	Conf.					Overall
Team	W		L		T	W		L		T
Santa Rosa $	5	–	0	–	0	7	–	2	–	1
Marin	3	–	2	–	0	?	–	?	–	?
Shasta	3	–	2	–	0	?	–	?	–	?
Sierra	3	–	2	–	0	?	–	?	–	?
Yuba	1	–	4	–	0	?	–	?	–	?
Napa	0	–	5	–	0	1	–	8	–	0
$ – Conference champion

1963 Golden Valley Conference football standings
	Conf.					Overall
Team	W		L		T	W		L		T
Santa Rosa $	5	–	0	–	0	9	–	1	–	0
Marin	4	–	1	–	0	?	–	?	–	?
Yuba	3	–	2	–	0	?	–	?	–	?
Napa	2	–	3	–	0	?	–	?	–	?
Sierra	1	–	4	–	0	?	–	?	–	?
Shasta	0	–	5	–	0	?	–	?	–	?
$ – Conference champion

1964 Golden Valley Conference football standings
	Conf.					Overall
Team	W		L		T	W		L		T
Santa Rosa $	5	–	0	–	0	?	–	?	–	?
Napa	4	–	1	–	0	7	–	2	–	0
Sierra	3	–	2	–	0	?	–	?	–	?
Marin	1	–	4	–	0	?	–	?	–	?
Shasta	1	–	4	–	0	?	–	?	–	?
Yuba	1	–	4	–	0	?	–	?	–	?
$ – Conference champion

1965 Golden Valley Conference football standings
	Conf.					Overall
Team	W		L		T	W		L		T
Shasta $	5	–	0	–	0	6	–	4	–	0
Yuba	4	–	1	–	0	5	–	4	–	0
Santa Rosa	3	–	2	–	0	4	–	5	–	0
Napa	2	–	3	–	0	4	–	5	–	0
Marin	1	–	4	–	0	2	–	6	–	1
Sierra	0	–	5	–	0	1	–	8	–	0
$ – Conference champion

1966 Golden Valley Conference football standings
	Conf.					Overall
Team	W		L		T	W		L		T
Sierra $	5	–	0	–	0	8	–	2	–	0
Shasta	4	–	1	–	0	6	–	3	–	0
Marin	2	–	3	–	0	5	–	4	–	0
Yuba	2	–	3	–	0	2	–	7	–	0
Napa	1	–	4	–	0	4	–	5	–	0
Santa Rosa	1	–	4	–	0	1	–	8	–	0
$ – Conference champion

1967 Golden Valley Conference football standings
	Conf.					Overall
Team	W		L		T	W		L		T
Marin $^	6	–	0	–	0	8	–	1	–	1
Yuba	4	–	1	–	1	4	–	4	–	1
Shasta	4	–	2	–	0	5	–	3	–	0
Sierra	3	–	2	–	1	5	–	3	–	1
Redwoods	1	–	5	–	0	3	–	6	–	0
Santa Rosa	1	–	5	–	0	2	–	5	–	2
Napa	1	–	5	–	0	2	–	7	–	0
$ – Conference champion; ^ – California state junior college small division playoff participant

1968 Golden Valley Conference football standings
	Conf.					Overall
Team	W		L		T	W		L		T
Redwoods $^	5	–	0	–	0	10	–	1	–	0
Yuba	4	–	1	–	0	7	–	2	–	0
Sierra	3	–	2	–	0	6	–	3	–	0
Butte	1	–	3	–	1	3	–	5	–	1
Shasta	1	–	3	–	1	1	–	7	–	1
Napa	0	–	5	–	0	1	–	7	–	0
Siskiyous			–			5	–	0	–	0
$ – Conference champion; ^ – California state junior college small division playoff participant

1969 Golden Valley Conference football standings
	Conf.					Overall
Team	W		L		T	W		L		T
Yuba +^	5	–	1	–	0	10	–	1	–	0
Redwoods +	5	–	1	–	0	8	–	1	–	0
Butte	4	–	2	–	0	5	–	4	–	0
Shasta	3	–	3	–	0	3	–	6	–	0
Sierra	2	–	4	–	0	2	–	7	–	0
Napa	1	–	5	–	0	2	–	7	–	0
Siskiyous	1	–	5	–	0	1	–	7	–	0
+ – Conference co-champions; ^ – California state junior college small division playoff participant

1970 Golden Valley Conference football standings
	Conf.					Overall
Team	W		L		T	W		L		T
Redwoods $^	6	–	0	–	0	11	–	0	–	0
Butte	4	–	2	–	0	5	–	4	–	0
Shasta	3	–	2	–	1	4	–	4	–	1
Sierra	3	–	3	–	0	5	–	4	–	0
Yuba	2	–	3	–	1	3	–	5	–	1
Siskiyous	1	–	5	–	0	3	–	6	–	0
Napa	1	–	5	–	0	2	–	7	–	0
$ – Conference champion; ^ – California state junior college small division playoff participant

1971 Golden Valley Conference football standings
	Conf.					Overall
Team	W		L		T	W		L		T
Redwoods $^	6	–	0	–	0	9	–	1	–	0
Butte	5	–	1	–	0	8	–	1	–	0
Siskiyous	3	–	3	–	0	7	–	3	–	0
Yuba	3	–	3	–	0	5	–	4	–	0
Sierra	2	–	4	–	0	3	–	5	–	0
Shasta	2	–	4	–	0	3	–	6	–	0
Napa	0	–	6	–	0	0	–	10	–	0
$ – Conference champion; ^ – California state junior college small division playoff participant

1972 Golden Valley Conference football standings
	Conf.					Overall
Team	W		L		T	W		L		T
Redwoods $^	5	–	0	–	0	11	–	0	–	0
Shasta	4	–	1	–	0	4	–	5	–	0
Butte	3	–	2	–	0	5	–	4	–	0
Siskiyous	2	–	3	–	0	2	–	7	–	0
Sierra	0	–	4	–	1	1	–	7	–	1
Yuba	0	–	4	–	1	0	–	7	–	1
$ – Conference champion; ^ – California state junior college small division playoff participant

1973 Golden Valley Conference football standings
	Conf.					Overall
Team	W		L		T	W		L		T
Sierra +^	4	–	2	–	0	4	–	7	–	0
Butte +	4	–	2	–	0	7	–	3	–	0
Redwoods +	4	–	2	–	0	6	–	4	–	0
Shasta +	4	–	2	–	0	6	–	4	–	0
Yuba	3	–	3	–	0	3	–	6	–	0
Siskiyous	2	–	4	–	0	3	–	6	–	0
Napa	0	–	6	–	0	0	–	9	–	0
+ – Conference co-champions; ^ – California state junior college small division playoff participant

1974 Golden Valley Conference football standings
	Conf.					Overall
Team	W		L		T	W		L		T
Redwoods $^	6	–	0	–	0	10	–	1	–	0
Butte	4	–	2	–	0	8	–	2	–	0
Siskiyous	4	–	2	–	0	5	–	5	–	0
Sierra	2	–	4	–	0	5	–	4	–	0
Shasta	2	–	4	–	0	4	–	5	–	0
Yuba	2	–	4	–	0	4	–	6	–	0
Napa	1	–	5	–	0	4	–	5	–	0
$ – Conference champion; ^ – California state junior college Division III playoff participant

1975 Golden Valley Conference football standings
	Conf.					Overall
Team	W		L		T	W		L		T
Redwoods $	6	–	0	–	0	9	–	1	–	0
Butte	5	–	1	–	0	6	–	4	–	0
Shasta	4	–	2	–	0	4	–	5	–	0
Siskiyous	3	–	3	–	0	6	–	3	–	0
Napa	2	–	4	–	0	5	–	5	–	0
Sierra	1	–	5	–	0	2	–	7	–	0
Yuba	0	–	6	–	0	0	–	10	–	0
$ – Conference champion

1976 Golden Valley Conference football standings
	Conf.					Overall
Team	W		L		T	W		L		T
Redwoods $	7	–	0	–	0	11	–	0	–	0
Shasta	5	–	2	–	0	5	–	4	–	1
Butte	4	–	3	–	0	5	–	4	–	1
Sierra	4	–	3	–	0	5	–	5	–	0
Siskiyous	3	–	4	–	0	5	–	5	–	0
Mendocino	2	–	5	–	0	3	–	7	–	0
Yuba	2	–	5	–	0	3	–	7	–	0
Napa	1	–	6	–	0	2	–	8	–	0
$ – Conference champion

1977 Golden Valley Conference football standings
	Conf.					Overall
Team	W		L		T	W		L		T
Siskiyous $^	6	–	0	–	0	7	–	3	–	0
Redwoods	5	–	1	–	0	6	–	3	–	0
Butte	4	–	2	–	0	5	–	5	–	0
Yuba	3	–	3	–	0	7	–	3	–	0
Mendocino	2	–	4	–	0	3	–	6	–	0
Shasta	1	–	5	–	0	3	–	7	–	0
Sierra	0	–	6	–	0	2	–	8	–	0
$ – Conference champion; ^ – California state junior college Division II playoff participant

1978 Golden Valley Conference football standings
	Conf.					Overall
Team	W		L		T	W		L		T
Butte +	5	–	1	–	0	7	–	2	–	0
Shasta +^	5	–	1	–	0	6	–	4	–	0
Yuba	4	–	2	–	0	5	–	3	–	0
Siskiyous	3	–	3	–	0	5	–	4	–	0
Sierra	2	–	4	–	0	4	–	5	–	0
Redwoods	2	–	4	–	0	3	–	6	–	0
Mendocino	0	–	6	–	0	2	–	6	–	0
+ – Conference co-champions; ^ – California state junior college Division II playoff participant

1979 Golden Valley Conference football standings
	Conf.					Overall
Team	W		L		T	W		L		T
Butte $^	4	–	1	–	0	7	–	4	–	0
Redwoods	3	–	1	–	1	5	–	3	–	1
Sierra	2	–	2	–	1	5	–	3	–	1
Siskiyous	2	–	3	–	0	5	–	4	–	0
Yuba	2	–	3	–	0	4	–	5	–	0
Shasta	1	–	4	–	0	2	–	8	–	0
$ – Conference champion; ^ – California state junior college Division II playoff participant

1980 Golden Valley Conference football standings
	Conf.					Overall
Team	W		L		T	W		L		T
Siskiyous +^	5	–	2	–	0	8	–	3	–	0
Sierra +^	5	–	2	–	0	6	–	5	–	0
Shasta	4	–	3	–	0	4	–	6	–	0
Butte	3	–	4	–	0	5	–	5	–	0
Redwoods	3	–	4	–	0	5	–	5	–	0
Yuba	1	–	6	–	0	1	–	9	–	0
+ – Conference co-champions; ^ – California state junior college Division II playoff participant

1981 Golden Valley Conference football standings
	Conf.					Overall
Team	W		L		T	W		L		T
Siskiyous $	7	–	0	–	0	8	–	3	–	0
Sierra	5	–	2	–	0	6	–	4	–	0
Shasta	5	–	2	–	0	6	–	4	–	0
Butte	3	–	4	–	0	5	–	5	–	0
Napa	3	–	4	–	0	5	–	5	–	0
Solano	3	–	4	–	0	4	–	6	–	0
Redwoods	2	–	5	–	0	2	–	8	–	0
Yuba	0	–	7	–	0	0	–	10	–	0
$ – Conference champion; * – Solano forfeited to Sierra.

1982 Golden Valley Conference football standings
	Conf.					Overall
Team	W		L		T	W		L		T
Redwoods $	6	–	0	–	0	8	–	2	–	0
Siskiyous	5	–	1	–	0	8	–	2	–	0
Solano	3	–	3	–	0	5	–	4	–	1
Shasta	3	–	3	–	0	4	–	5	–	0
Butte	2	–	4	–	0	4	–	6	–	0
Sierra	2	–	2	–	0	4	–	6	–	0
Yuba	0	–	6	–	0	0	–	9	–	0
$ – Conference champion

1983 Golden Valley Conference football standings
	Conf.					Overall
Team	W		L		T	W		L		T
Shasta $	6	–	0	–	0	8	–	3	–	0
Redwoods	5	–	1	–	0	9	–	1	–	0
Siskiyous	3	–	3	–	0	7	–	3	–	0
Sierra	2	–	3	–	1	3	–	6	–	1
Solano	2	–	4	–	0	4	–	5	–	1
Butte	1	–	4	–	1	2	–	7	–	1
Yuba	1	–	5	–	0	2	–	7	–	0
$ – Conference champion

1984 Golden Valley Conference football standings
	Conf.					Overall
Team	W		L		T	W		L		T
Yuba $	6	–	0	–	0	9	–	2	–	0
Redwoods	4	–	2	–	0	7	–	3	–	0
Siskiyous	3	–	3	–	0	5	–	4	–	0
Solano	3	–	3	–	0	5	–	5	–	0
Sierra	3	–	3	–	0	4	–	6	–	0
Butte	2	–	4	–	0	4	–	6	–	0
Shasta	0	–	6	–	0	1	–	9	–	0
$ – Conference champion

1985 Golden Valley Conference football standings
	Conf.					Overall
Team	W		L		T	W		L		T
Siskiyous $	6	–	0	–	0	9	–	1	–	0
Redwoods	4	–	2	–	0	5	–	5	–	0
Shasta	4	–	2	–	0	5	–	5	–	0
Sierra	4	–	2	–	0	4	–	6	–	0
Solano	1	–	5	–	0	3	–	7	–	0
Butte	1	–	5	–	0	2	–	8	–	0
Yuba	1	–	5	–	0	1	–	9	–	0
$ – Conference champion

1986 Golden Valley Conference football standings
	Conf.					Overall
Team	W		L		T	W		L		T
Butte +	2	–	1	–	0	9	–	2	–	0
Shasta +	2	–	1	–	0	7	–	4	–	0
Siskiyous +	2	–	1	–	0	6	–	4	–	0
Redwoods	0	–	3	–	0	3	–	5	–	0
+ – Conference co-champions

1988 Golden Valley Conference football standings
	Conf.					Overall
Team	W		L		T	W		L		T
Redwoods $	4	–	0	–	0	8	–	2	–	1
Shasta	2	–	1	–	1	7	–	1	–	2
Butte	2	–	1	–	1	7	–	3	–	1
Yuba	1	–	3	–	0	4	–	6	–	0
Siskiyous	0	–	4	–	0	1	–	9	–	0
$ – Conference champion

1989 Golden Valley Conference football standings
	Conf.					Overall
Team	W		L		T	W		L		T
Butte $	5	–	1	–	0	10	–	1	–	0
Redwoods	4	–	2	–	0	6	–	4	–	0
Shasta	2	–	4	–	0	3	–	7	–	0
Siskiyous	1	–	5	–	0	4	–	6	–	0
$ – Conference champion

1990 Golden Valley Conference football standings
	Conf.					Overall
Team	W		L		T	W		L		T
Butte $	5	–	1	–	0	9	–	1	–	0
Redwoods	3	–	3	–	0	7	–	4	–	0
Shasta	2	–	4	–	0	5	–	5	–	0
Siskiyous	2	–	4	–	0	4	–	5	–	0
$ – Conference champion

== See also ==
- List of college athletic conferences in the United States
