= Bay Valley Conference =

The Bay Valley Conference is an all-sport conference within the California Community College Athletic Association.

== Members ==
Team	School	City
Alameda Cougars	College of Alameda	Alameda
Contra Costa Comets	Contra Costa College	San Pablo
Laney Eagles	Laney College	Oakland
Los Medanos Mustangs	Los Medanos College	Pittsburg
Marin Mariners	College of Marin	Novato
Mendocino Eagles	Mendocino College	Ukiah
Merritt Thunderbirds	Merritt College	Oakland
Napa Valley Storm	Napa Valley College	Napa
Solano Falcons	Solano Community College	Fairfield
Yuba 49ers	Yuba College	Marysville

== Yearly football standings ==
1986 Bay Valley Conference football standings
	Conf.					Overall
Team	W		L		T	W		L		T
Contra Costa $	4	–	0	–	0	6	–	4	–	0
Sierra	3	–	1	–	0	4	–	5	–	0
Mendocino	2	–	2	–	0	2	–	6	–	0
Marin	1	–	3	–	0	1	–	9	–	0
Yuba	0	–	4	–	0	0	–	9	–	0
$ – Conference champion

1987 Bay Valley Conference football standings
	Conf.					Overall
Team	W		L		T	W		L		T
Shasta $	9	–	0	–	0	10	–	1	–	0
Contra Costa	7	–	2	–	0	8	–	3	–	0
Butte	6	–	3	–	0	7	–	4	–	0
Redwoods	5	–	4	–	0	5	–	4	–	1
Sierra	4	–	5	–	0	4	–	6	–	0
Siskiyous	4	–	5	–	0	4	–	6	–	0
Solano	4	–	5	–	0	4	–	6	–	0
Yuba	3	–	6	–	0	3	–	7	–	0
Mendocino	2	–	7	–	0	2	–	7	–	0
Marin	1	–	8	–	0	1	–	9	–	0
$ – Conference champion

1988 Bay Valley Conference football standings
	Conf.					Overall
Team	W		L		T	W		L		T
Contra Costa $	4	–	0	–	0	5	–	5	–	0
Solano	3	–	1	–	0	4	–	4	–	1
Sierra	2	–	2	–	0	4	–	6	–	0
Mendocino	1	–	3	–	0	3	–	7	–	0
Marin	0	–	4	–	0	0	–	10	–	0
$ – Conference champion

1989 Bay Valley Conference football standings
	Conf.					Overall
Team	W		L		T	W		L		T
Solano $	7	–	0	–	0	10	–	1	–	0
Sierra	5	–	2	–	0	5	–	5	–	0
Contra Costa	3	–	4	–	0	4	–	6	–	0
Yuba	3	–	4	–	0	3	–	7	–	0
Marin	2	–	5	–	0	2	–	8	–	0
Mendocino	1	–	6	–	0	1	–	9	–	0
$ – Conference champion

1990 Bay Valley Conference football standings
	Conf.					Overall
Team	W		L		T	W		L		T
Solano +	6	–	1	–	0	8	–	3	–	0
Sierra +	6	–	1	–	0	7	–	4	–	0
Yuba	4	–	3	–	0	4	–	6	–	0
Marin	3	–	4	–	0	5	–	5	–	0
Contra Costa	2	–	5	–	0	2	–	8	–	0
Mendocino	0	–	7	–	0	0	–	10	–	0
+ – Conference co-champions

1997 Bay Valley Conference football standings
	Conf.			Overall
Team	W		L	W		L
Mendocino $	4	–	1	6	–	5
Marin	3	–	2	5	–	5
Contra Costa	2	–	3	3	–	7
Yuba	2	–	3	3	–	7
Sierra	0	–	5	0	–	10
$ – Conference champion

1998 Bay Valley Conference football standings
	Conf.			Overall
Team	W		L	W		L
Yuba $	4	–	0	7	–	3
Mendocino	3	–	1	3	–	7
Sierra	1	–	3	2	–	8
Marin	1	–	3	2	–	8
Contra Costa	1	–	3	2	–	8
$ – Conference champion

1999 Bay Valley Conference football standings
	Conf.			Overall
Team	W		L	W		L
Mendocino $	5	–	0	9	–	1
Yuba	3	–	2	5	–	5
Marin	2	–	3	2	–	7
Sierra	1	–	4	2	–	8
Contra Costa	0	–	5	0	–	10
$ – Conference champion

2000 Bay Valley Conference football standings
	Conf.			Overall
Team	W		L	W		L
Yuba $	5	–	0	9	–	2
Mendocino	3	–	2	5	–	5
Sierra	3	–	2	5	–	5
Contra Costa	2	–	3	5	–	5
Marin	1	–	4	2	–	8
$ – Conference champion

2001 Bay Valley Conference football standings
	Conf.			Overall
Team	W		L	W		L
Yuba $	4	–	0	7	–	3
Mendocino	3	–	1	5	–	5
Contra Costa	2	–	2	7	–	3
Sierra	1	–	3	6	–	4
Marin	0	–	4	1	–	9
$ – Conference champion
