= Lassen Community College =

Public college in Susanville, California, US

Lassen College
- Type: Public community college
- Established: 1925; 101 years ago
- Academic affiliations: CCCS; ACCJC
- President: Carie Camacho
- Faculty: 2,023
- Students: 2,526; 581 full-time
- Location: Susanville, California, U.S. 40.4315°N 120.6326°W
- Campus: Rural 165 acres (67 ha)
- Colors: Orange and Black
- Nickname: Cougars
- Sporting affiliations: CCCAA – [Golden State Conference], NIRA (Rodeo)
- Mascot: Cody the Cougar
- Website: www.lassencollege.edu

Lassen Community College is a public community college in Susanville, California. It is a part of the California Community Colleges System.

The college is located in Susanville in the high mountain lake country of northeastern California. The campus looks out over the city to Diamond Peak and the Sierra Nevada. Eagle Lake, the third largest lake wholly contained in California, is 20 miles (32 km) away. The college-operated Coppervale Ski Area is 14 miles (23 km) from campus. The campus, located on Highway 139, consists of 165 acres (67 ha), 39 buildings, and an equine area.

Lassen Community College offers A.S. and A.A. degrees as well as CTE, online, and distance programs. Carie Camacho is the interim Superintendent and President, serving in those roles since 2022.

== Gunsmithing ==
The Lassen Community College Gunsmithing Program was established in 1945 and is the oldest gunsmithing school in the United States. The program offers Associate in Science Degrees in Firearms Repair and General Gunsmithing, as well as Certificates of Completion for Pistolsmith, Riflesmith, Long Guns, and Gunsmith Machinist and Metal Finishing.

== Fire Science ==
Lassen Community College’s fire science program runs academies for Cal Fire. Prior to the ordered closure of the California Correctional Center it was the main training hub for incarcerated firefighters in Northern California.

== Athletics ==
Lassen Community College competes in the CCCAA division for all athletics programs except for rodeo (NIRA). Programs for men include baseball, basketball, wrestling, soccer, and rodeo. Programs for women include softball, basketball, wrestling, soccer, rodeo, volleyball, and beach volleyball.

The first school mascot was the Camel, from 1937 to shortly after World War II. The current school mascot is the Cougar. All Cougars athletics programs participate in the Golden Valley Conference and compete against other community colleges, such as Butte College, Feather River College, Lake Tahoe Community College, College of the Redwoods, Shasta College and College of the Siskiyous.

== Notable alumni ==
- Kelly Anundson, professional MMA fighter
- Shelton Benjamin, professional wrestler
- Quinton Jackson (attended), professional MMA fighter
- Anthony Johnson, professional MMA fighter
- Ray Kerr, professional baseball player
- Vladimir Matyushenko (attended), professional MMA fighter
- Robert Stone (basketball), professional basketball player

== Notable educators ==
- Robert Todd Carroll (born 1945), publisher of The Skeptic's Dictionary and fellow for Committee for Skeptical Inquiry
- Jean LaMarr, artist
