= LTCC =

LTCC may refer to:

- Lake Tahoe Community College
- Low temperature co-fired ceramic
- London Terminal Control Centre
- L-type calcium channel
- Longwall Top Coal Caving
- Diyarbakır Airport (LTCC)
- Lakshadweep Territorial Congress Committee or Lakshadweep Pradesh Congress Committee (LPCC), branch of the Indian National Congress in Lakshadweep
