= Lieutenant Governor of California =

Second-highest elected office in California

- Great Seal of the State of California

- State flag

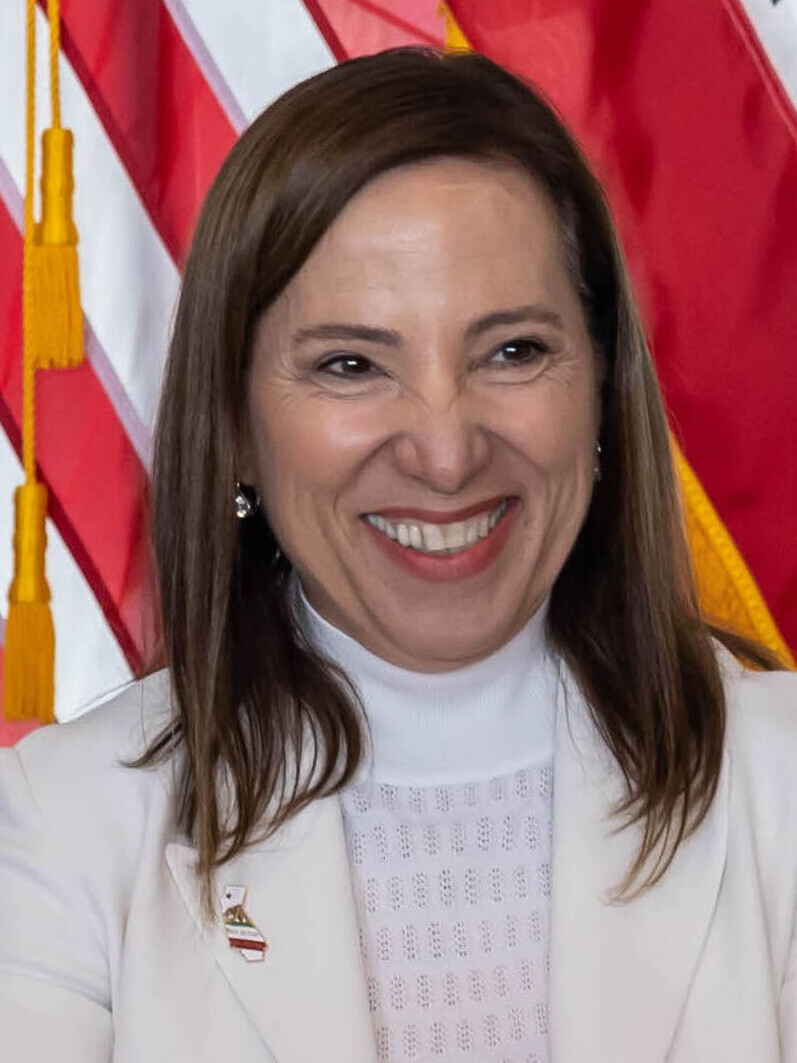
- Incumbent; Eleni Kounalakis since January 7, 2019
- Government of California; California State Senate
- Style: Madam Lieutenant Governor (Informal); The Honorable (Formal); Madam President (when presiding over California Senate)
- Member of: Constitutional; California State Senate; University of California Board of Regents; Statutory; California Community Colleges Board of Governors; California State Lands Commission; California State University Board of Trustees
- Residence: None official
- Seat: Sacramento, California; California State Capitol
- Appointer: Popular vote
- Term length: Four years, renewable once
- Constituting instrument: Constitution of California
- Inaugural holder: John McDougal; 1849
- Succession: First (gubernatorial line of succession)
- Salary: $130,490
- Website: Official website

The lieutenant governor of California is the second highest executive officer of the government of the U.S. state of California. The lieutenant governor is elected to serve a four-year term and can serve a maximum of two terms. In addition to largely ministerial roles, serving as acting governor in the absence of the governor of California and as President of the California State Senate, the lieutenant governor either sits on or appoints representatives to many of California's regulatory commissions and executive agencies.

California is one of seventeen states where the governor and lieutenant governor do not run as running mates on the same ticket: in California the governor and lieutenant governor are elected separately, although both are up for election in the same year every four years. As a result, California has frequently had a governor and a lieutenant governor of different parties.

California has had 41 lieutenant governors and five acting lieutenant governors since achieving statehood in 1850. The current lieutenant governor is Eleni Kounalakis, a Democrat who was sworn into office on January 7, 2019. She is the first woman elected to the office in California history.

== Responsibilities ==
The lieutenant governor is, after the governor, the highest-ranking executive officer of the state of California. The responsibilities of this independently elected office are largely concerned with core constitutional duties, matters of higher education, natural resources management, and economic development. In addition, the lieutenant governor carries out certain miscellaneous functions.

=== Core constitutional duties ===
Article V, Sections 9 of the California Constitution designates the lieutenant governor as president of the California State Senate. Likewise, Article V, Section 10 of the Constitution provides that the lieutenant governor becomes governor whenever a vacancy befalls the governor's office and otherwise exercises all the powers belonging to the governor in an acting capacity whenever the governor is absent from the state of California, with the lieutenant governor often signing or vetoing legislation, or making political appointments in lieu of the chief executive. In practice, the lieutenant governor only presides over the Senate when requested by the president pro tempore or in order to cast a tie-breaking vote. Moreover, there is a gentlemen's agreement for the lieutenant governor not to perform more than perfunctory duties while the governor is away from the state. This agreement was violated when Mike Curb was in office, as he signed several executive orders at odds with the administration of Jerry Brown and appointed Armand Arabian as presiding justice on the California Courts of Appeal when Brown was out of the state. Brown withdrew Arabian's appointment upon his return, appointing Bernard S. Jefferson in his place. In the 1979 case In re Governorship, the California Supreme Court upheld the lieutenant governor's right to perform the duties and assume all of the prerogatives of governor while the governor is out of the state, but that the governor generally has the right to rescind those actions upon their return.

=== Higher education ===
The lieutenant governor is the only elected official in California to have a comprehensive policymaking role over the entire higher education system. By virtue of office, he or she is a full voting member of the Board of Regents of the University of California, the Board of Trustees of California State University, the Board of Governors of the California Community College System, and the Calbright College Board of Trustees. Indeed, the lieutenant governor's membership on the University of California Board of Regents is mandated by Article IX, Section 9 of the California Constitution.

=== Natural resources ===
Together with the state controller and director of finance, the lieutenant governor is a member of the California State Lands Commission. The State Lands Commission is an independent state agency which manages 450,000 acres of school trust lands and an additional 4,000,000 acres of public trust lands consisting of California's foreshore, nearshore, and the beds of natural navigable rivers, streams, lakes, bays, estuaries, inlets, and straits. The position of commission chair alternates annually between the lieutenant governor and the state controller; in those years when the lieutenant governor is commission chair, the lieutenant governor is also a voting member of the Ocean Protection Council and a non-voting member of the California Coastal Commission.

=== Economic development ===
The lieutenant governor chairs the Commission for Economic Development, which is responsible for fostering economic growth in California by developing and implementing strategies for attracting new business to the state, increasing state exports, creating new jobs, and stimulating industries statewide. The commission is composed of appointees from the legislature and the governor and currently does not have a quorum needed to meet.

=== Miscellaneous functions ===
Many California projects created through gubernatorial executive orders, or through the initiative process, include a role for the lieutenant governor. For example, the lieutenant governor serves on the Agriculture-Water Transition Task Force (created by Governor Gray Davis), and five of the twenty-nine members of the oversight committee of the California Institute for Regenerative Medicine are appointed by the lieutenant governor.

== Criticism of the office ==
Some academics and scholars such as Roger E. Noll and Bruce Cain in Constitutional Reform in California have criticized constitutional offices like the lieutenant governor because of their low visibility among the electorate that can make it difficult for the electorate to hold constitutional officers like the lieutenant governor responsible for their actions. Although the lieutenant governor of California's powers and responsibilities are clearly lesser than those of the governor, the ability to make appointments to, and decisions on, the boards of executive agencies does allow the lieutenant governor to make policy decisions that, due to their separate election, might well conflict with the agenda of the governor. Thus, it is argued, California might benefit if the governor and the lieutenant governor ran on the same ticket. The lieutenant governor would then be more likely to help the governor – who is subject to a greater degree of voter scrutiny – to implement their policies, but that is unlikely.

In 2003, although Lt. Governor Cruz Bustamante and Governor Gray Davis were both Democrats, they reportedly had an icy relationship and had not spoken in months before the 2003 California recall election approached. Bustamante's decision to run in the recall election was controversial, as many supporters of Governor Davis had urged prominent Democrats not to run, in an attempt to undermine the legitimacy of the event.

Despite being the second highest-ranking office in California, the lieutenant governor has no real legislative agenda (i.e. in contrast to its powerful counterpart in Texas), so the job has been jokingly defined by political insiders as "get up, read the paper, see if the governor is dead, if not, go back to sleep." Despite its prestige, it has not historically been a strong springboard to higher political office; Gray Davis and current Governor Gavin Newsom are the only Democrats in state history and the only state politicians in the last eight decades to be elected governor after holding the post. Furthermore, the lieutenant governor's office budget has suffered considerable cutbacks in recent times; the proposed annual budget for July 2011 will be slightly over $1 million and include three staffers, while from 1995 to 1999 the office had a $1.3 million annual budget with a staff of 17. By contrast the attorney general of California oversees 5,300 employees, including 1,110 state attorneys, and its 2010 budget was over $700 million.

== See also ==
- List of lieutenant governors of California
- List of current United States lieutenant governors
- Impeachment in California
