= Big 8 Conference (California) =

The Big 8 Conference is a junior college athletic conference within the California Community College Athletic Association (CCAAA). The conference formed in July 2007 as the Big 7 Conference when seven schools split from the Bay Valley Conference. The conference took on its current name when Modesto Junior College joined as the league's eighth member, on July 1, 2007. Folsom Lake College joined as the conference's ninth member in 2016.

== Member schools ==
| Team | School | City |
|---|---|---|
| American River Beavers | American River College | Sacramento |
| Cosumnes River Hawks | Cosumnes River College | Sacramento |
| Diablo Valley Vikings | Diablo Valley College | Pleasant Hill |
| Folsom Lake Falcons | Folsom Lake College | Folsom |
| Modesto Pirates | Modesto Junior College | Modesto |
| Sacramento City Panthers | Sacramento City College | Sacramento |
| San Joaquin Delta Mustangs | San Joaquin Delta College | Stockton |
| Santa Rosa Bear Cubs | Santa Rosa Junior College | Santa Rosa |
| Sierra Wolverines | Sierra College | Rocklin |
