= Pacific Coast Athletic Conference =

Coordinates: 32.7462°N 116.9391°W

The Pacific Coast Athletic Conference (PCAC) is a college athletic conference that is affiliated with the California Community College Athletic Association (CCCAA) and includes community colleges in the San Diego region of California. The PCAC has won numerous state championships in the CCCAA.

== History ==
In California, following World War II, several new colleges were opened causing many new conference alignments. In San Diego County, the first college involved in athletics was San Diego City College in the 1920s. Oceanside/Carlsbad (MiraCosta College) began in 1934. In 1962, Imperial Valley College opened their new college campus. Starting in the 1920s, there were community colleges operating in El Centro and Brawley. Palomar College began in 1946. In 1961, Southwestern and Grossmont colleges opened, and in 1964, San Diego Mesa College opened.

During these years, a second issue causing conferencing changes was the varying size of colleges. To be immediately eligible for athletics, an athlete needed to have been a local high school graduate. This caused great difficulty in finding realistic levels of competition for smaller colleges who, for the most part, were geographically isolated. The state designated conferences by small colleges or large colleges with separate play-off structures. When the small college designation was dropped, it motivated the forming of separate conferences for football only and using geographic consideration for all other sports.

The Pacific Coast Conference was first organized in 1982–83 with the following memberships: Grossmont, Imperial Valley, MiraCosta, Palomar, Saddleback, San Diego City, San Diego Mesa, and Southwestern Colleges. In 1994–95, Saddleback left the Conference and joined the Orange Empire Conference. In 1987, Cuyamaca College, a second campus in the Grossmont District, became a member. Prior to 1982, the Conference colleges belonged to several different conferences. San Diego City College, and later San Diego Mesa College, belonged to the Metropolitan Conference. Imperial Valley College and Oceanside Junior College, now MiraCosta College, were in the Desert Conference, and later with Palomar and Southwestern Colleges in the South Central Conference. In 1962–1964, Grossmont and Southwestern Colleges were in the Eastern Conference.

In 1964–65, five San Diego County colleges formed the Pacific Southwest Conference: Grossmont, Palomar, San Diego City, San Diego Mesa and Southwestern Colleges. For two years, 1965 to 1967, Oceanside/Carlsbad (now MiraCosta College) and Imperial Valley College joined the Conference. In 1967–68, they left the Conference and rejoined the Desert Conference. During 1968–69, for football, Grossmont, Palomar, and Southwestern colleges were in the Southeastern Conference. San Diego City and San Diego Mesa Colleges were in the Metro Conference. In 1969–70, the Mission, an all sports conference, was formed, consisting of Chaffey, Citrus, Cypress, Grossmont, Palomar, Riverside, San Bernardino, and Southwestern Colleges. In 1974, Grossmont changed to the Foothill Conference.

Beginning in 1977, the Conference included both men and women’s teams. Prior to 1977, the women’s teams were considered club teams and were not under the State Commission of Athletics. The Pacific Coast Conference rotates the Conference President’s position, alphabetically from college to college. The first Conference Commissioner was Chester S. DeVore. He served in the position from 1982 through 1998. Felix Rogers was selected to the Commissioner position in 1998 and still serves in that position. The Conference has been active in seeking ways to improve Community College Athletics locally and statewide.

Beginning in 1996–97, after several years of rejection by the Commission on Athletics (C.O.A.), the Conference was authorized to allow open recruiting in adjacent community college districts in San Diego County. In 1999, the state of California adopted open recruiting in adjacent districts.

== Current members ==
- Crafton Hills College
- College of the Desert
- Cuyamaca College
- Grossmont College
- Imperial Valley College
- MiraCosta College
- Miramar College
- Mt. San Jacinto College
- Palomar College
- San Bernardino Valley College
- San Diego City College
- San Diego Mesa College
- Southwestern College

== State championship teams ==
Cross country – men
1965 – Grossmont College
1972 – Grossmont College
1973 – Grossmont College
1973 – Palomar College – Small College Division
1974 – Grossmont College
1975 – Grossmont College
1976 – Grossmont College
1977 – Grossmont College
1978 – Grossmont College
1979 – Grossmont College
1979 – MiraCosta College – Small College Division
1980 – Grossmont College
1982 – Grossmont College
1985 – Grossmont College
1993 – Cuyamaca College
2000 – San Diego Mesa College
2001 – San Diego Mesa College

Cross country – women
1983 – MiraCosta College
1984 – MiraCosta College
1986 – MiraCosta College
1994 – San Diego Mesa College

Football bowl game winners
1949 – Gold Dust Bowl – San Diego City College
1964 – Orange Show Bowl - San Diego City College
1966 – Orange Show Bowl – San Diego Mesa College
1985 – Hall-of-Fame Bowl – Grossmont College/Southwestern College (tie)
1986 – Hall-of-Fame Bowl – Southwestern College
1987 – Hall-of-Fame Bowl – San Diego Mesa College
1988 – Hall-of-Fame Bowl – Southwestern College
1989 – Hall-of-Fame Bowl – Palomar College
1990 – Hall-of-Fame Bowl – Palomar College
1991 – Elks Bowl (State Championship) – Palomar College
1992 – Simple Green Bowl – Palomar College
1993 – San Francisco Community Bowl (State Championship) – Palomar College
1994 – San Diego Community College Bowl – Palomar College
1997 – No Fear Bowl – Palomar College
1998 – Potato Bowl – Grossmont College
1998 – 1st Down Bowl (Southern Cal Championship) – Palomar College
1998 – Capitol Shrine Bowl (State Championship) – Palomar College
2001 – Southern California Bowl (Southern Cal Championship) – Palomar College
2002 – South County Bowl — Palomar College
2008 — Golden Empire Bowl — Palomar College

Golf – men
1977 – Grossmont College
1983 – Saddleback College

Softball
1989 – Palomar College
1993 – Palomar College
2000 – Palomar College
2013 – Palomar College
2015 – Palomar College

Tennis – men
1968 – San Diego Mesa College
1986 – Grossmont College

Tennis – women
1991 – Grossmont College
1993 – Grossmont College
1996 – Grossmont College
2002 – Grossmont College

Track and field – women
1998 – San Diego Mesa College

Volleyball – women
1987 – Grossmont College
1989 – Grossmont College

Wrestling
1978 – Palomar College
1983 – Palomar College
1985 – Palomar College
1988 – Palomar College
1992 – Palomar College
