= Central Valley Conference =

Junior college athletic conference in California

- Association: 3C2A
- Founded: 1979
- Commissioner: Kulwant Singh
- Sports fielded: 17; men's: 8; women's: 9
- No. of teams: 11
- Region: Central California
- Official website: www.centralvalleyconference.com

The Central Valley Conference (CVC) is a junior college athletic conference affiliated with the California Community College Athletic Association (3C2A). Its members are located in Central California. The CVC was formed in 1979 with eight charter members: the College of the Sequoias, Columbia College of Sonora, Fresno City College, Merced College, Modesto Junior College, Reedley College, West Hills College Coalinga—now known as Coalinga College. Columbia, Merced, Porteville, and West Hills Coalinga were previously members of the Central Conference. Fresno City, Modesto, Reedley, and Sequoias has been members of the Valley Conference. The CVC began operation in 1980.

== Yearly football standings ==
1980 Central Valley Conference football standings
	Conf.					Overall
Team	W		L		T	W		L		T
Modesto $	6	–	0	–	0	11	–	0	–	0
Fresno City	4	–	2	–	0	5	–	5	–	0
Merced	3	–	3	–	0	7	–	3	–	0
Sequoias	3	–	3	–	0	4	–	6	–	0
West Hills	2	–	4	–	0	5	–	5	–	0
Porterville	2	–	4	–	0	4	–	6	–	0
Kings River	1	–	5	–	0	2	–	8	–	0
$ – Conference champion

1981 Central Valley Conference football standings
	Conf.					Overall
Team	W		L		T	W		L		T
Sequoias $	5	–	1	–	0	7	–	4	–	0
Fresno City	4	–	2	–	0	5	–	4	–	1
Porterville	4	–	2	–	0	6	–	5	–	0
Merced	4	–	2	–	0	5	–	5	–	0
Modesto	3	–	3	–	0	4	–	6	–	0
West Hills	1	–	5	–	0	2	–	7	–	0
Kings River	0	–	6	–	0	2	–	7	–	1
$ – Conference champion

1982 Central Valley Conference football standings
	Conf.					Overall
Team	W		L		T	W		L		T
West Hills +	4	–	2	–	0	7	–	4	–	0
Merced +	4	–	2	–	0	8	–	3	–	0
Sequoias +	4	–	2	–	0	5	–	5	–	0
Fresno City	3	–	3	–	0	5	–	5	–	0
Porterville	3	–	3	–	0	5	–	5	–	0
Modesto	2	–	4	–	0	5	–	5	–	0
Kings River	1	–	5	–	0	1	–	8	–	0
+ – Conference co-champions

1983 Central Valley Conference football standings
	Conf.					Overall
Team	W		L		T	W		L		T
Merced $	5	–	1	–	0	7	–	4	–	0
Modesto	4	–	2	–	0	6	–	3	–	1
Fresno City	4	–	2	–	0	5	–	5	–	0
Kings River	4	–	2	–	0	5	–	5	–	0
Sequoias	3	–	3	–	0	5	–	5	–	0
West Hills	1	–	5	–	0	3	–	7	–	0
Porterville	0	–	6	–	0	3	–	7	–	0
$ – Conference champion

1984 Central Valley Conference football standings
	Conf.					Overall
Team	W		L		T	W		L		T
Merced $	5	–	0	–	0	10	–	1	–	0
Fresno City	4	–	1	–	0	5	–	4	–	0
Sequoias	3	–	2	–	0	7	–	3	–	0
Kings River	2	–	3	–	0	6	–	4	–	0
West Hills	1	–	4	–	0	4	–	6	–	0
Porterville	0	–	5	–	0	2	–	8	–	0
$ – Conference champion

1985 Central Valley Conference football standings
	Conf.					Overall
Team	W		L		T	W		L		T
Merced $	5	–	0	–	0	8	–	1	–	2
Sequoias	3	–	2	–	0	6	–	4	–	0
Fresno City	2	–	3	–	0	3	–	7	–	0
Kings River	2	–	3	–	0	3	–	7	–	0
Porterville	2	–	3	–	0	2	–	8	–	0
West Hills	1	–	4	–	0	2	–	8	–	0
$ – Conference champion

1986 Central Valley Conference football standings
	Conf.					Overall
Team	W		L		T	W		L		T
Taft $	5	–	0	–	0	7	–	3	–	0
Kings River	3	–	2	–	0	5	–	5	–	0
College of the Sequoias	3	–	2	–	0	4	–	6	–	0
Fresno City	3	–	2	–	0	4	–	6	–	0
Porterville	1	–	4	–	0	2	–	8	–	0
West Hills Coalinga	0	–	5	–	0	0	–	8	–	0
$ – Conference champion

1987 Central Valley Conference football standings
	Conf.					Overall
Team	W		L		T	W		L		T
Taft $	5	–	0	–	0	9	–	1	–	0
Sequoias	4	–	1	–	0	10	–	1	–	0
Porterville	3	–	2	–	0	6	–	4	–	0
Fresno City	2	–	3	–	0	4	–	6	–	0
Kings River	1	–	4	–	0	3	–	7	–	0
West Hills	0	–	5	–	0	3	–	6	–	0
$ – Conference champion

1994 Central Valley Conference football standings
	Conf.					Overall
Team	W		L		T	W		L		T
Fresno City $	4	–	0	–	0	9	–	2	–	0
Merced	3	–	1	–	0	7	–	4	–	0
Modesto	2	–	2	–	0	7	–	4	–	0
Sequoias	1	–	3	–	0	4	–	6	–	0
Kings River	0	–	4	–	0	2	–	8	–	0
$ – Conference champion

1995 Central Valley Conference football standings
	Conf.					Overall
Team	W		L		T	W		L		T
Modesto +	4	–	1	–	0	9	–	1	–	0
Merced +	4	–	1	–	0	8	–	2	–	0
Kings River	2	–	3	–	0	6	–	4	–	0
Fresno City	2	–	3	–	0	5	–	5	–	0
College of the Sequoias	1	–	3	–	1	2	–	7	–	1
West Hills Coalinga	1	–	3	–	1	1	–	7	–	1
+ – Conference co-champions

1996 Central Valley Conference football standings
	Conf.			Overall
Team	W		L	W		L
College of the Sequoias +	4	–	1	7	–	4
Merced +	4	–	1	7	–	4
Fresno City	3	–	2	6	–	5
Kings River	2	–	3	6	–	4
Modesto	2	–	3	3	–	7
West Hills Coalinga	0	–	5	1	–	8
+ – Conference co-champions
