= Mendocino College =

Community college in Ukiah, California, US

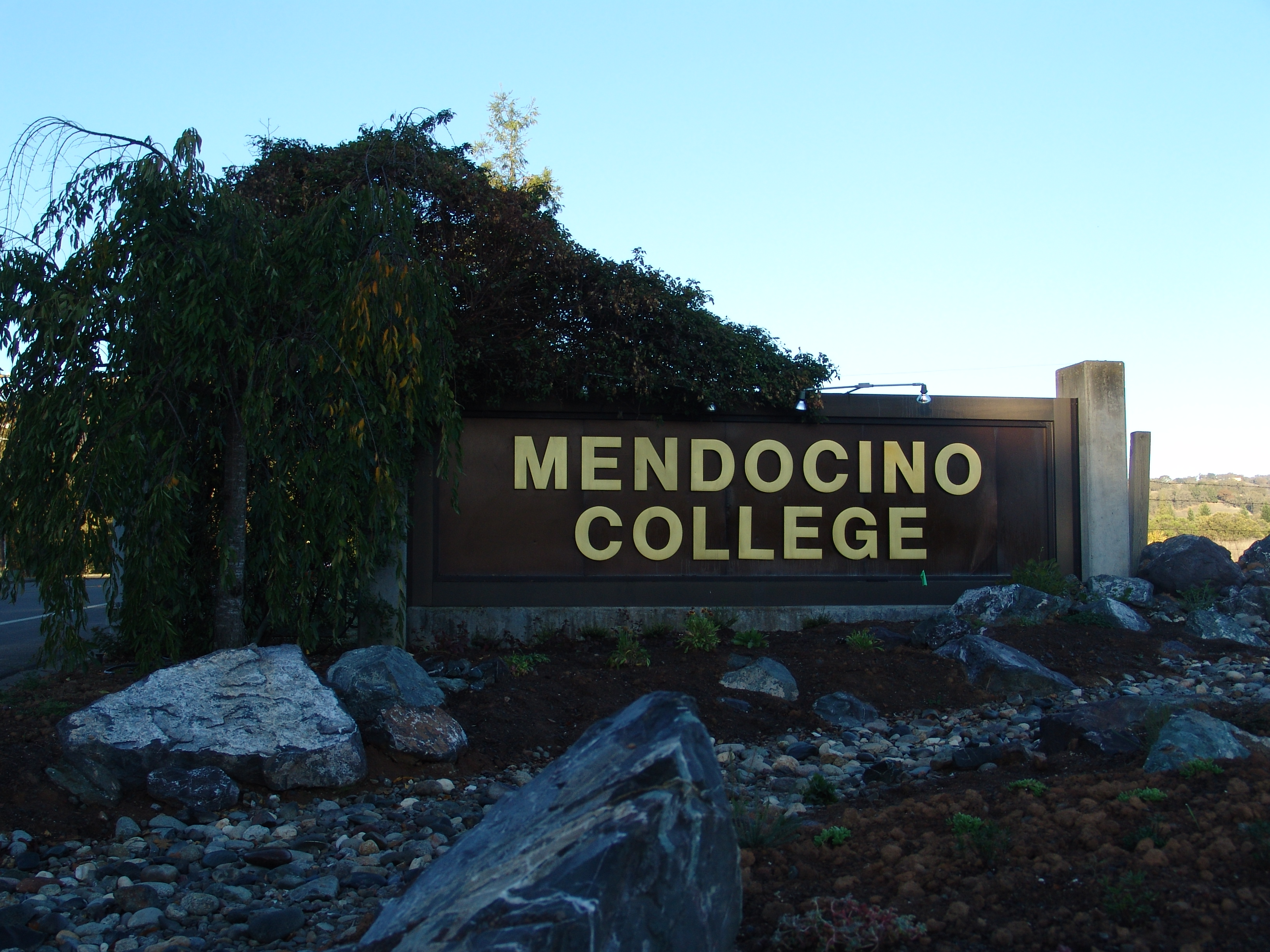
- Type: Public community college
- Established: 1973
- President: Tim Karas
- Students: 3,990
- Location: Ukiah, California, United States; 39°11′22″N 123°13′38″W
- Campus: Rural 127 acres
- Colors: Blue and Gold
- Mascot: Eagle
- Website: mendocino.edu

Mendocino College is a public community college in Ukiah, California. It was founded in 1973. The main campus is located on 127 acres (0.51 km^{2}) of hilltop land north of downtown Ukiah in the Ukiah valley. It has about 4,000 students, 55 full-time faculty, and 200 adjunct faculty members. Three branches of the college exist, in Lakeport, Willits, and Fort Bragg.

== History ==
Mendocino College was formed by vote of the citizens of the Anderson Valley, Laytonville, Potter Valley, Round Valley, Ukiah, and Willits Unified School Districts. In the Spring of 1973, the planning for the development of the college began and in July 1973 classes were offered. On November 5, 1974, the citizens again voted to expand the district to include Lake County Districts of Upper Lake, Kelseyville, and Lakeport. Established in 1975, the new district boundaries covered 3,200 square miles of land. In 1981, the district was named Mendocino-Lake Community College District. The new name better reflected the geographical location and area being served.

- 1972 – A new college district was formed to serve the Mendocino County areas of Anderson Valley, Round Valley, Ukiah and Willits. Peter DeVries was named first president.
- 1979 – The Lake Center moved to a larger building as student enrollment grew ever larger.
- 1980 – College centers in Willits and Lakeport were established. District-wide course offerings had expanded to more than 550 classes, including 120 day and evening classes in Lake County. Distance learning courses were also offered.
- 1980, February – Mendocino College received accreditation from the Western Association of Schools and Colleges.
- 1981 – Facilities at the Fairgrounds in Ukiah became so impacted that some programs moved to other locations. The library relocated to the corner of State and Gibson streets.
- 1983, October 21 – Ground was broken on the first Ukiah Campus building, the library, and the old portables were hauled up from the fairgrounds.
- 1985, Summer – Classes began on the new Ukiah campus.
- 1985–86 – The Classroom/Administration Building was constructed and provided classrooms and faculty and administrative offices.
- 1987–88 – Vocational/Technical Building and Agricultural Headhouse projects were constructed.
- 1988 – New Child Development Lab built, featuring a round design with a central observation room.
- 1989 – Physical Education complex was added
- 1993–94 – Mendocino College's Center for the Visual and Performing Arts was built.
- 1998–99 – Lake Center moves to a new 10,000 sq. ft. facility at 1005 Parallel Drive, Lakeport, one day before open registration for the Fall semester. The new building includes a Learning Lab.
- 2004 – New Science Complex opens August; 20,000 sq. ft. facility.
- 2006 – Measure W $67.5 million Facilities Bond Passed.
- 2013 - Opening of the new 15,000 sq. ft. Lake Center in Lakeport.
- 2014 – Coast Center begins operating in Fort Bragg on a site formerly operated by the College of the Redwoods
- 2017 – Official grand opening of Coast Center

== Photos of Mendocino College ==
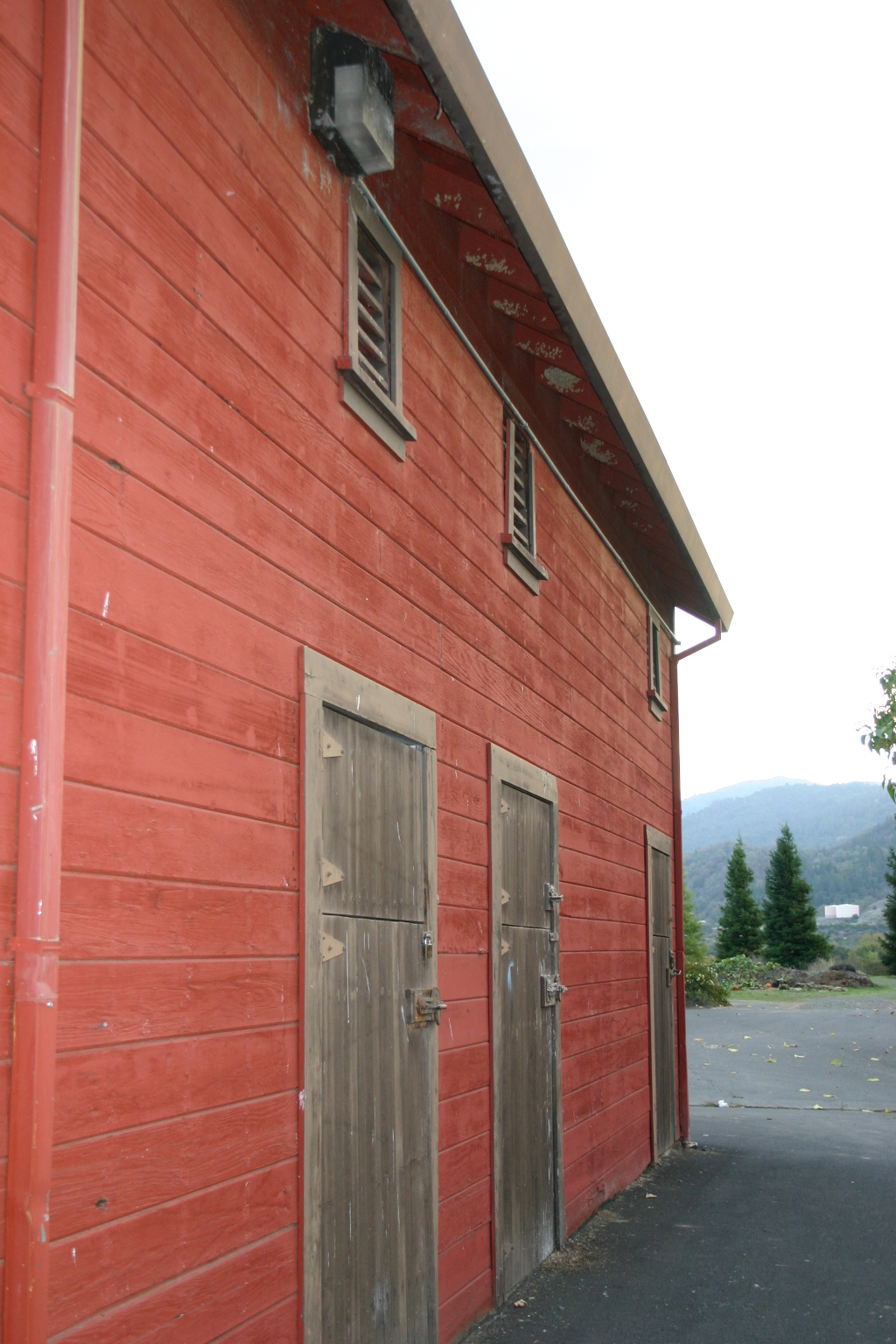
Building on college campus

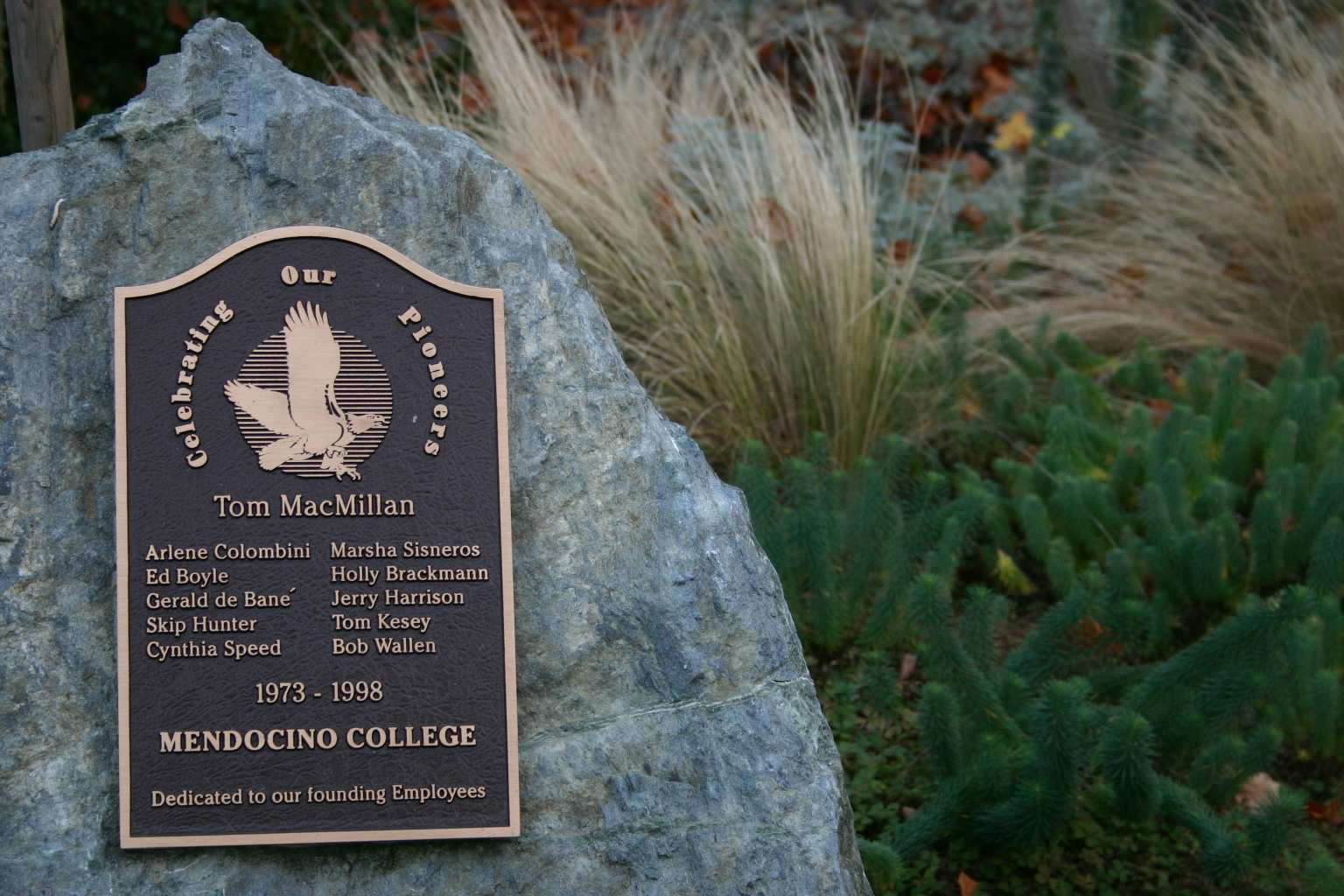
Commemorative plaque

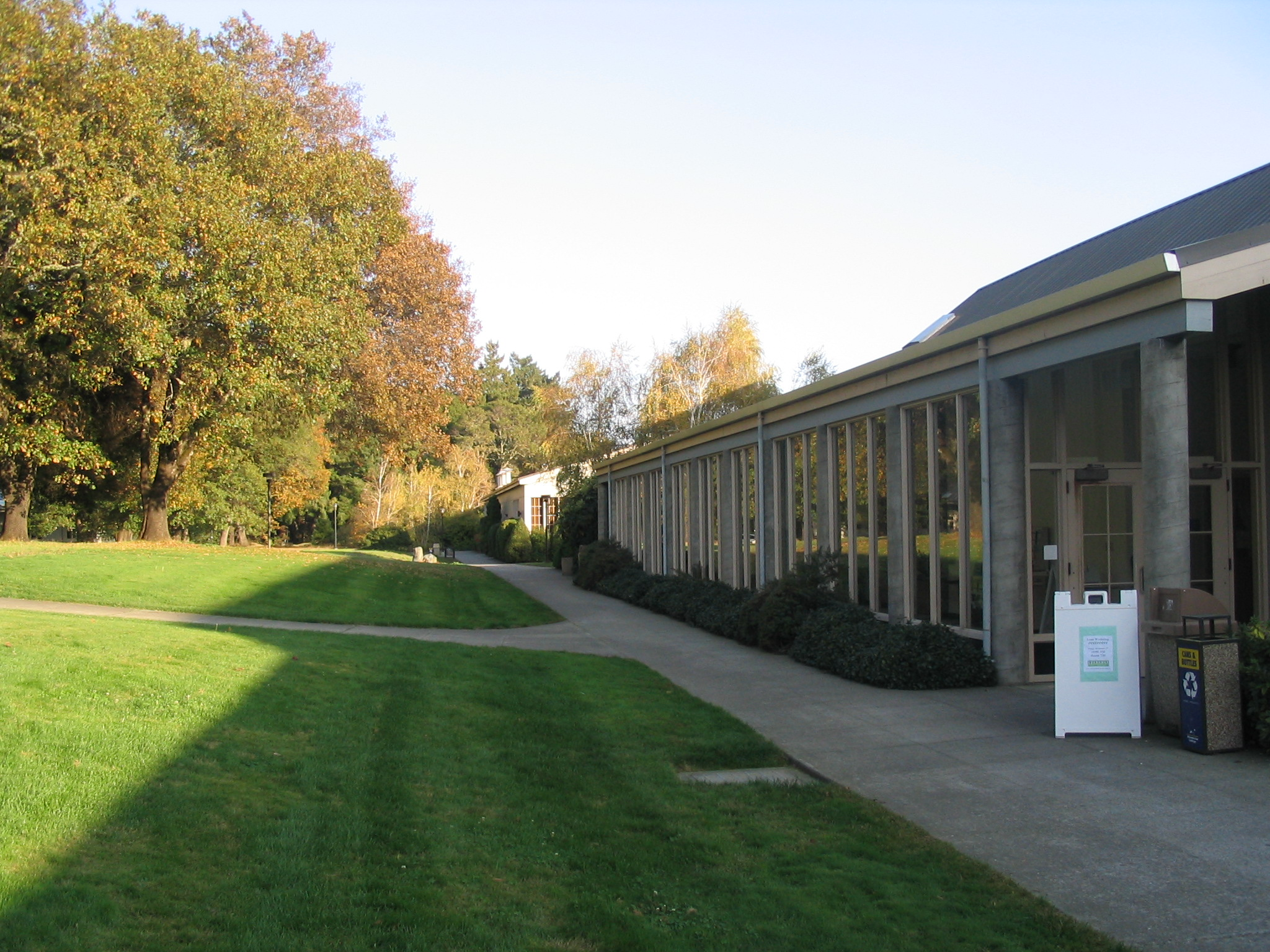
Library on college campus

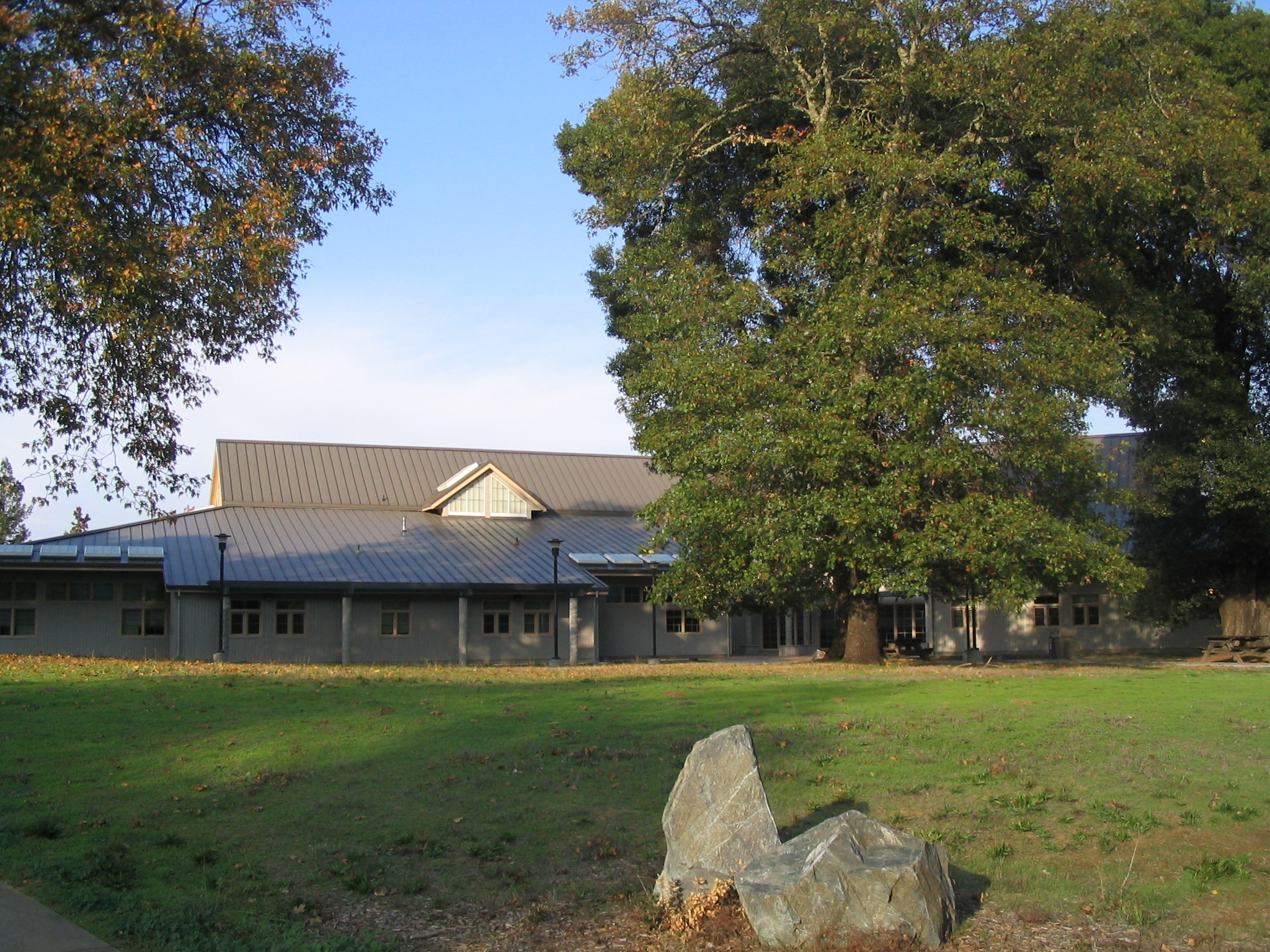
Building on college campus
