= Calbright College =

Community college in California

- Type: Community college
- Established: July 2018; 8 years ago
- Parent institution: California Community Colleges
- Accreditation: DEAC
- President: Ajita Talwalker Menon
- Students: 6,363 (March 2025)
- Location: Online, California, USA
- Colors: Blue, orange, and yellow
- Website: https://www.calbright.edu/

Calbright College is a public community college in California. It was established in 2018 as the 115th California Community College and is the first fully-online community college in the United States. Calbright's programing is aimed towards providing workers ages 25 to 34 with short term, affordable credentials and job training.

== History ==
In May 2017, Governor Jerry Brown began a push to create a fully online community college, tasking California Community Colleges Chancellor Eloy Ortiz Oakley with creating and submitting a plan to establish one by November 2017. The Chancellor's office created the Flex Learning Options for Workers (FLOW) work group which developed three proposed options for the online college. The new college could be housed within an existing community college, a collaboration between a consortium of existing community colleges, or a completely new college with support from the chancellor's office. The initial proposals received push-back from the California Community Colleges Academic Senate, Faculty Association, and Board of Governors, with criticism around student isolation in an online-only environment and concerns that the college was unnecessary due to online education models at other community colleges.

Governor Brown's proposed 2018–19 budget included $120 million to open an online college by Fall 2019. In June 2018, the California State Legislature and Governor Brown agreed to a proposed spending package which included $100 million in one-time funding and $20 million in ongoing funding for a new online college. The California Community College's Board of Governors would serve as the governing board and choose a president to oversee the online college. The budget required that the new college achieve accreditation candidacy or pre-accreditation by 2022 and full accreditation by 2025. Additionally, the new college could not duplicate content offered by other local community colleges and was prohibited form charging fees higher than a traditional college.

In February 2019, Heather Hiles, former deputy director of the Bill & Melinda Gates Foundation, was hired as the college's first CEO and President. Hiles was given a four-year contract with a $385,000 base salary, $10,000 annual car allowance salary, and a yearly bonus, making her the fourth-highest-paid community college leader in the state.

In June 2019, the name Calbright College was chosen from a list of over 100 options. Calbright College officially opened October 1, 2019, allowing up to 400 students to apply to three career pathway programs in cybersecurity, information technology and medical coding. On its opening day, Calbright College exceeded that limit, with over 700 students submitting applications to enroll in the new college.

In January 2020, President and CEO Heather Hiles resigned just eleven months into her four year contract. Hiles had faced controversy after granting a $552,000 no-bid contract to a personal friend of hers and faced threats of a lawsuit by the California Federation of Teachers. The CFT claimed that Hiles had violated an agreement to not duplicate content offered at other colleges and a state law that required community colleges to direct at least half of expenditures to instructors’ salaries. Hiles was placed on administrative leave until March 31 and replaced by interim president Ajita Talwalker Menon, a former higher education policy adviser in the Obama administration. Menon was selected as Calbright College's next President and CEO in July 2020. Menon was given a three-year contract with a $285,000 a year base salary and up to $10,000 bonus. In October 2026 the Board of Trustees approved giving Menon a $450,000 a year base salary, $20,000 retention bonus in 2027-2028, $25,000 retention bonus in 2028-2029, and a $6,000 annual car allowance.

During its first three years in operation, Calbright College faced three attempts by state lawmakers to shut it down, with fierce opposition from state lawmakers and the California Federation of Teachers.

However, by 2023, Calbright had begun increasing enrollment and completion numbers. In August 2023, 3,240 were enrolled in Calbright College, a 201% increase from 1,078 students in July 2022 and a 574% increase from 481 students in July 2021. Additionally, certificate completion rose 102% from the previous year. Calbright College also received accreditation from the Distance Education Accrediting Commission in July 2023, allowing it to award transfer credits to and from other colleges. In March 2024, Calbright College enrolled 4,327 students. In January 2025, Calbright College announced its 1,000th awarded certificate and a 400% increase in enrollment in the past two years.

In May 2026, Calbright College's Board of Trustees approved layoff notices affecting 90+ of the college's 170+ employees amid budget uncertainty, to take effect with the new fiscal year beginning July 1, 2026. In June 2026, the California Governor's budget for 2026-2027 was passed by the state legislature, and included a $38 million ongoing funding increase for Calbright, bringing its total annual support to about $53 million.

== Academics ==
At its opening in 2019, Calbright College offered three certificate programs in cybersecurity, information technology and medical coding. By September 2023, Calbright offered 17 programs, including programs in data analysis and project management. In March 2026, Calbright offered 10 programs: information technology support, cybersecurity, CRM platform administration, data analysis, project management, network technology, HR learning and development, medical coding, HR talent acquisition, and community health worker.

Since its inception, Calbright College has supported free tuition for all California residents over the age of 18. Calbright also offers a lending library to provide free Chromebooks and Wi-Fi hotspots for students.

Calbright College operates on a competency-based education model. Rather than receiving grades, students learn at their own pace and finish the course after mastering required skills.

As of June 2026, "the vast majority of those attending at Calbright either officially drop out, stop participating, or remain paused indefinitely."

== Enrollment ==
In October 2019, Calbright College began enrolling its first students. In its first year, Calbright enrolled over 900 students. However, over 40% of students had dropped out and only 12 students had graduated.

By the end of 2021, Calbright College reported 748 enrolled students and 70 completed certificates.

By 2023, Calbirght had experienced large growth in its enrollment. In August 2023, 3,240 were enrolled in Calbright College, a 201% increase from July 2022 and a 574% increase from July 2021.

In January 2024, Calbright College enrolled over 4,000 students for the first time. As of March 2025, Calbright College enrolled 6,363 students.

Calbright College was designed to support non-traditional and diverse students. As of March 2024, 40% of Calbright students were unemployed, 79% identified as Black, Indigenous, or a people of color, 90% were 25+ years old, and 32% of students were parents or caregivers.

Student demographics as of Fall 2023
Race and ethnicity	Total
Hispanic	31%
White	22%
African American	18%
Asian	13%
Filipino	5%
Multiracial	5%
Unknown	4%
American Indian/Alaska Native	1%
Pacific Islander	1%

== Closure attempts ==
During its first three years in operation, lawmakers attempted to shut down Calbright College on three separate occasions. In 2020, the California State Legislature's 2020-21 joint budget proposal called for the college to be shut down and its funds redirected to other needs in the California Community College system. Criticism was directed to Calbright's high cost per student, lack of accreditation, and duplication of programs at other colleges. Calbright College survived after a negotiated budget with Governor Gavin Newsom and the state legislature saved it from elimination. Instead of being defunded, Calbright College would lose $5 million in ongoing funds and $40 million in unspent funds in had previously received.

In July 2020, Calbright College faced a seven month audit to assess its progress and ability to live up to its mission. In May 2021, California State Auditor Elaine Howle released the results of the audit, which found that the college had only graduated 12 of its 900+ students in its first year and had an over 40% dropout rate. While the report determined that Calbright had significant potential value, it criticized poor management by Calbright's executives, citing inflated salaries, unethical hiring practices, little support for students, and a lack of strategic planning to spend its budget. The report recommended improvements to Calbright including aligning its salaries with other community colleges, developing a detailed spending plan, improving student recruitment, and tracking student progress and graduation. The report further recommended eliminating Calbright College if it did not demonstrate substantial improvements by the end of 2022. The week prior to the release of the report, the California State Assembly voted 71-0 in favor AB 1432, a bill co-authored by Assembly members Evan Low and Jose Medina which would eliminate Calbright by the end of the 2022-23 school year. Calbright survived its second shutdown attempt after the California Senate Education Committee cancelled a hearing on the bill.

In February 2022, Assemblyman Jose Medina introduced AB 2820, a bill which would shut down Calbright College by January 2024 and reallocate its funding to basic need centers and student housing at other California community colleges. The bill passed the assembly in a 60-0 vote but once again failed after it did not receive a hearing in the California Senate Education Committee.
