= Solano Community College =

Public college in Fairfield, California, US

- Former names: Vallejo Junior College
- Type: Public community college
- Established: 1945
- Parent institution: California Community Colleges System
- Superintendent president: Kellie Sims Butler
- Students: 10,814
- Location: Fairfield, California, U.S. 38.2327°N 122.1263°W
- Colours: Solano Blue and white
- Sporting affiliations: Bay Valley Conference
- Mascot: Falcons
- Website: www.solano.edu

Solano Community College (SCC) is a public community college in Fairfield, California, with additional centers in Vacaville and Vallejo. The college is part of California Community Colleges System. SCC's service area includes all of Solano County, and the town of Winters in Yolo County. It has 10,814 students.

In 2016, Solano College was approved by the ACCJC to offer its first baccalaureate degree in biomanufacturing. The first cohort of students began the Bachelor of Science degree program in fall.

== History ==
The college was established in 1945 as Vallejo Junior College. It was part of the Vallejo City Unified School District until 1967, when it established itself as a countywide institution.

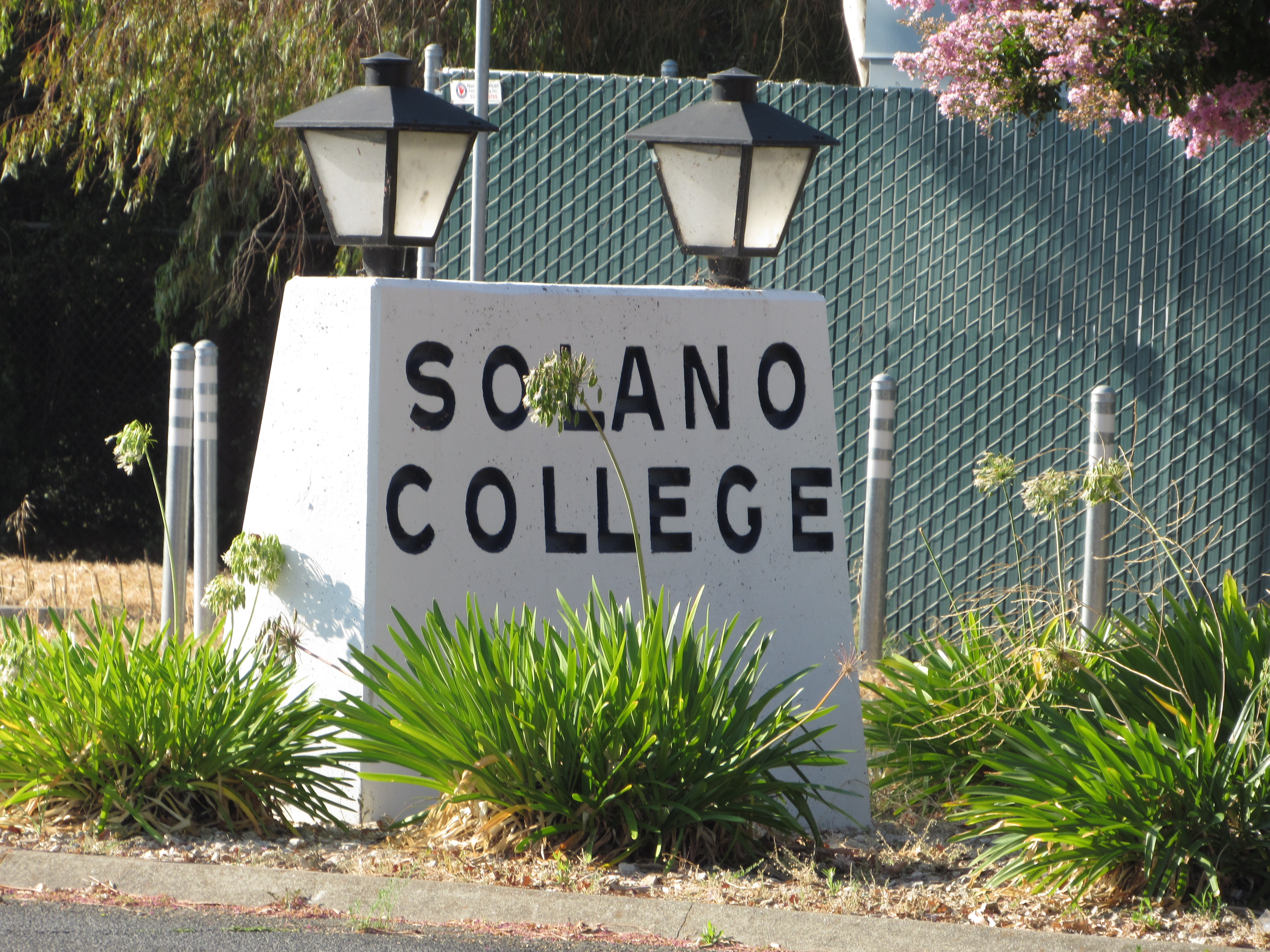
Stone Solano College sign on Suisun Valley Road in Fairfield

== Campuses ==
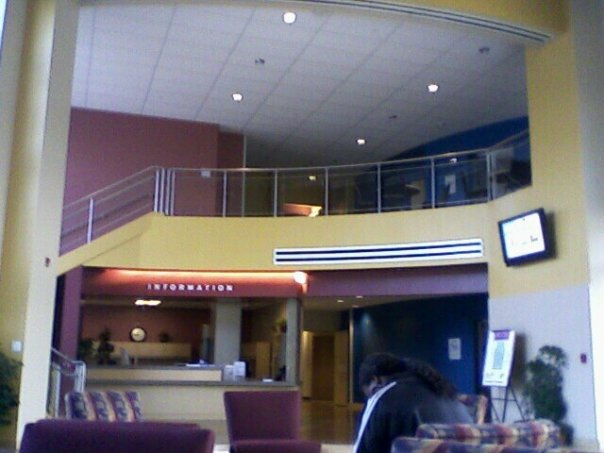
The main lobby of Vallejo campus

SCC consists of a main campus in Fairfield and two centers: one in Vacaville and another in Vallejo. It also offers classes at other locations including Travis Air Force Base. The 192-acre (0.78 km^{2}) main campus in Fairfield was completed in 1971. The Vallejo Center opened in 2007 and the Vacaville Center opened in 2008. In 2017, the college opened the Biotechnology and Science Building in Vacaville and the Auto Technology Building in Vallejo, and completed an extensive remodel on its theatre on the Fairfield campus. Solano College also holds classes at the Nut Tree Airport in Vacaville where they have a large hangar that houses the aviation mechanics and avionics mechanics programs. In its first year at the Fairfield campus, the college had approximately 5,000 students. By 2007, the three campuses had approximately 11,000 students taking on-ground and online classes .

== Notable alumni ==
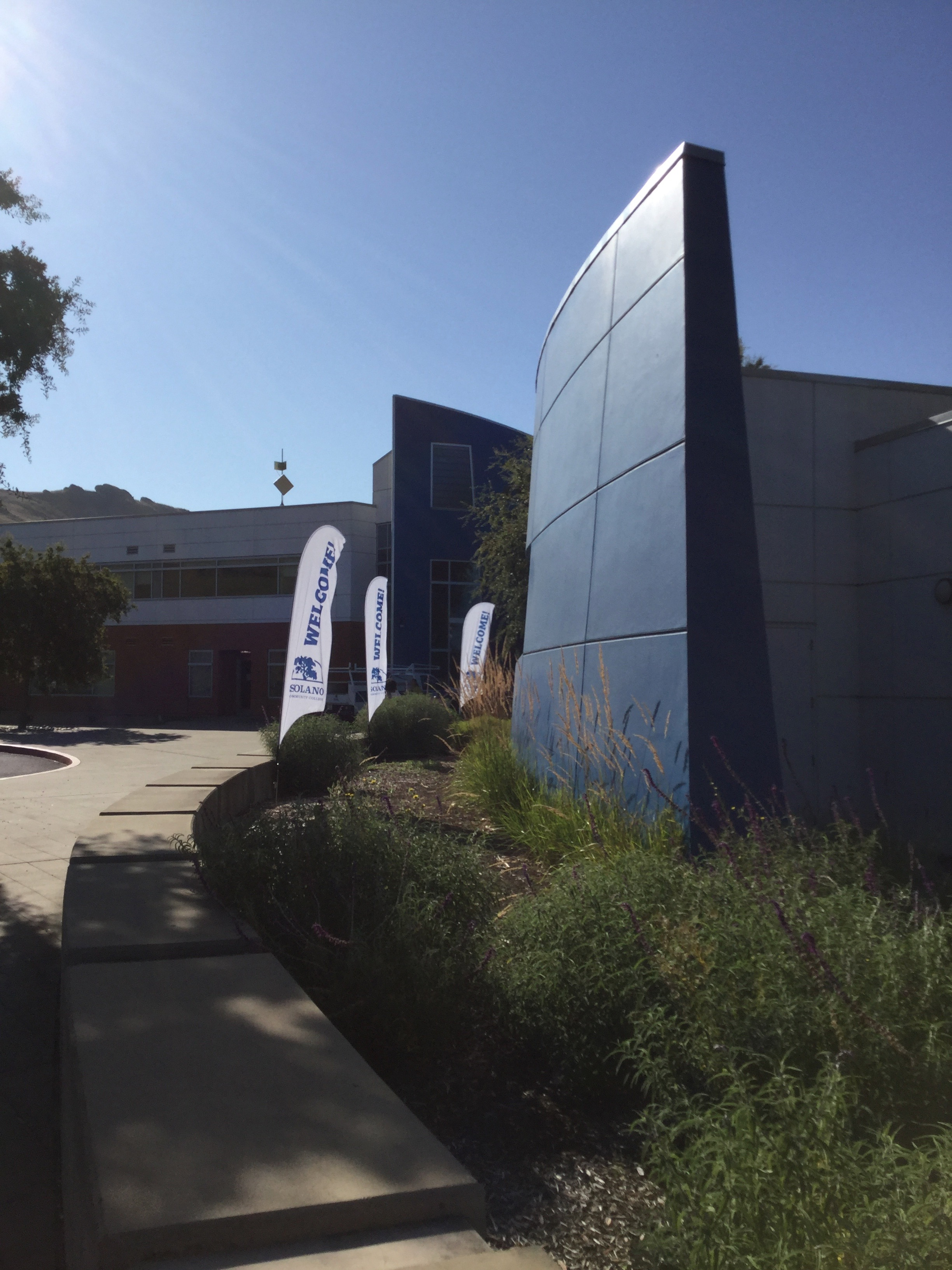
Solano Community College campus in Vallejo, California.

- Baby Bash, rapper known for Suga Suga and Cyclone
- Joe Carnahan, independent film director
- Johnny Colla, musician/producer/singer/songwriter and founding member of Huey Lewis and the News
- Mike Gibson, professional football player
- Bakari Hendrix, professional basketball player
- Tug McGraw, Major League Baseball relief pitcher and the father of Country music singer Tim McGraw
- Dawn Morrell, nurse and former member of the Washington House of Representatives
- Ed Rollins, Republican campaign consultant
- Sylvester (Sly) Stewart, Musician and Creator of the famous funk group Sly & the Family Stone
- Rudy Sylvan, NFL, player for the Detroit Lions
- Rob Wainwright, PBA player for the Welcoat Dragons

== See also ==
- San Joaquin Delta Community College District, which serves Rio Vista, a town in Solano County.
