= Sierra College =

Public community college in Rocklin, California

- Former name: Placer College
- Motto: Esse Quam Videri
- Motto in English: To be, rather than to seem
- Tagline: Find Your Amazing
- Type: Public community college
- Established: 1936
- President: Willy Duncan IV
- Students: 24,992
- Location: Rocklin, California, United States; 38.788637°N 121.209496°W
- Campus: Suburban
- Colors: Cardinal and White
- Sporting affiliations: CCCAA, Big 8 Conference (California)
- Mascot: Wolverines
- Website: www.sierracollege.edu

Sierra College is a public community college in Rocklin, California. It is part of the Sierra Joint Community College District, a district that covers over 3,200 square miles (8,300 km^{2}), serves Placer, Nevada and parts of El Dorado and Sacramento counties.

== History ==
The college was officially founded in 1936 and is fully accredited by the Western Association of Schools and Colleges. This is the date that the school uses as the official establishment, even though it had been operating under various names and places before this. It was established as Placer Junior College. In 1954 the college was named "College of the Sierras" with a wolverine as the mascot. There were other junior colleges named after regions. These included: College of the Redwoods, College of the Sequoias & College of the Siskiyous The main campus in Rocklin was chosen by 1960, out of 35 possible sites. The planned construction of Interstate 80 was a consideration in the decision making. In 1961, the new campus opened.

In 1996, another campus in Nevada County opened, in between Grass Valley and Nevada City. The Grass Valley campus is also used by the Ghidotti Early College High School where students take both high school and college courses. During 2000–2005, outreach campuses in Roseville and near Truckee were opened.

It is governed by a board of seven trustees who are elected district-wide and a student trustee. Only five individuals have held the post of president in the last 50 years.

== Academics ==
Approximately 125 degree and certificate programs are offered in a wide variety of configurations taught by 216 full and 650 part-time faculty members. Faculty typically has the minimum of a master's degree in their fields and enhance their teaching with research, authorship and industry expertise. Classes are offered both in traditional "on-ground" classrooms and, increasingly, in an online format.

== Athletics ==
The Sierra College mascot is the Wolverine. Sierra College participates in the Big 8 Conference, and is a member of the California Community College Athletic Association.

Athletic events
The 2002 USA Cross Country Championships were held on the Sierra College cross country course.

== Student body association ==
A California nonprofit public benefit corporation named "Associated Students of Sierra College" (ASSC) has been operating at Sierra College since 1959. The board of trustees of the Sierra Joint Community College District has authorized ASSC to operate at Sierra College as a "student body association". In addition, ASSC "is recognized as the official voice for the students in District consultation processes".

== Notable people ==
- Buffy Wicks, California State Assembly member, District 15
- Ryan Guzman, actor and model
- Alex Obert, current captain of the United States water polo team, competed in the 2020 Summer Olympics.
- John Romero, game designer
- Heather Rene Smith, Playboy Playmate of the Month (February 2007)
- James LeVoy Sorenson, inventor and entrepreneur
- Fenuki Tupou, offensive guard for the Philadelphia Eagles
- Brandon Aiyuk, NFL wide receiver for the San Francisco 49ers
- Joseph James DeAngelo, Golden State Killer
- Alexis Alford, youngest person to travel to every country
