= Napa Valley College =

Community college in Napa, California, US

Coordinates: 38°16′29″N 122°16′32″W

- Type: Public community college
- Established: 1942
- President: Dr. Torence J. Powell
- Students: 6,881
- Location: Napa, California, U.S.
- Campus: Suburban
- Nickname: Storm
- Website: www.napavalley.edu

Napa Valley College, formerly Napa Junior College and Napa Community College, is a public community college in Napa, California. The tree-lined main campus is on 160 acres (65 ha) overlooking the Napa River and includes a performing arts center, a child development center, a business development center, a Visual Arts Center including a Gallery and Ceramics Studio, and the Napa Valley Vintners Teaching Winery. An Upper Valley Campus in St. Helena includes the Napa Valley Cooking School, training aspiring chefs. In 2014–2015, the total enrollment was about 8,559.

== History ==
The college was founded in 1942 after voters in Napa County passed a bond initiative in 1941. From 1942 to 1964, it operated as a four-year junior college, incorporating grades 11 through 14. The original campus was located on the same property as Napa High School. The college was later moved to its current location in 1965 when a campus was established on surplus state property which originally was part of land belonging to Napa State Hospital.

== See also ==
- Pacific Union College
