= College of the Siskiyous =

Community college in Siskiyou County, California, US

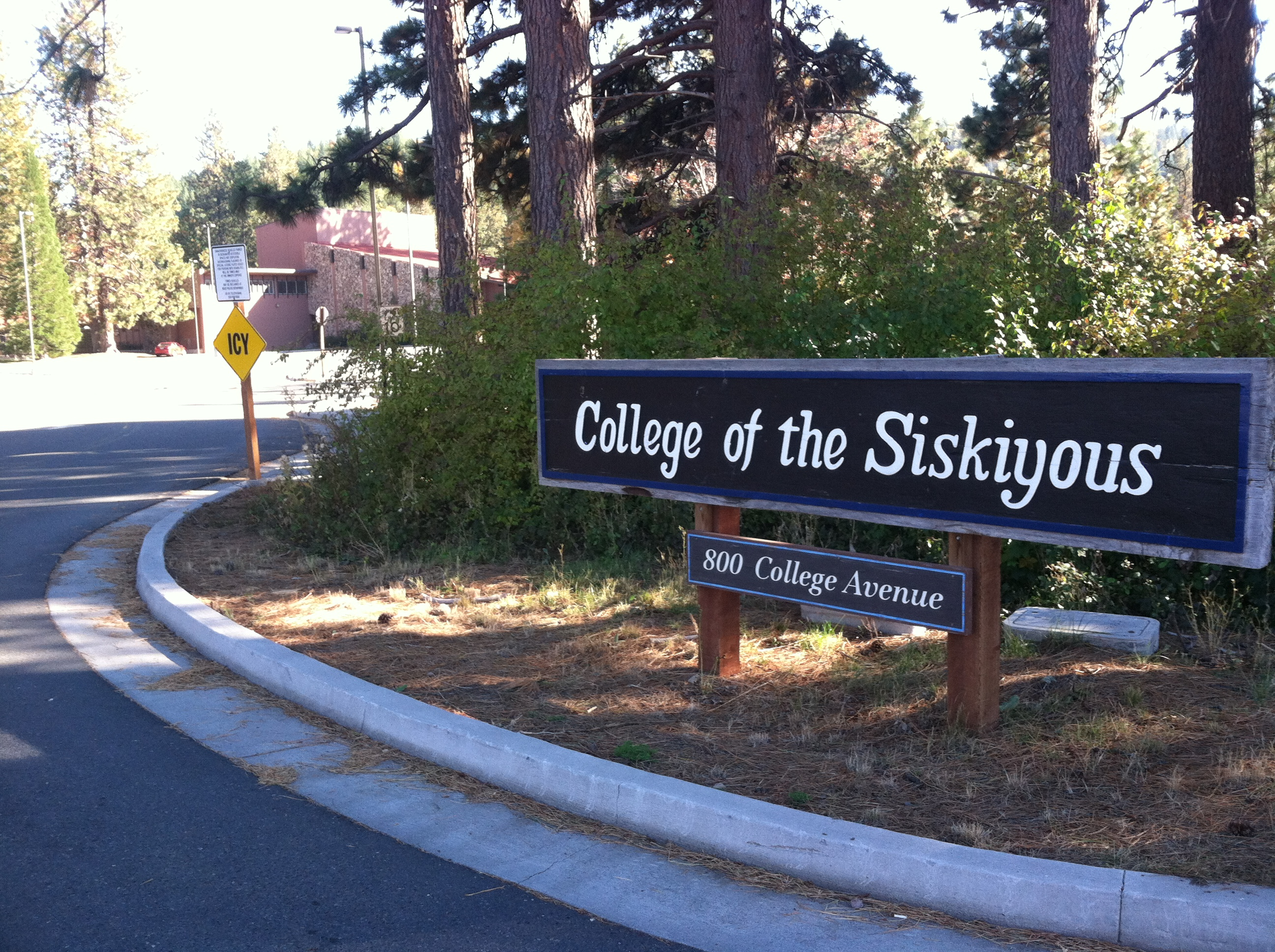
- Type: Public community college
- Established: 1957
- Parent institution: California Community Colleges system
- President: Char Perlas
- Students: 2,473 (in 2012)
- Location: Weed, California, United States; 41°24′44″N 122°23′21″W
- Mascot: Eagle
- Website: www.siskiyous.edu

College of the Siskiyous (COS) is a public community college with campuses in Weed and Yreka in Siskiyou County in Northern California. It is part of the California Community Colleges System, serving as the northernmost college in the state of California and the only college in Siskiyou County. The college is in the service area of California State University, Chico and one of only eleven community colleges in California that provide on-campus housing for students.

== History ==
In 1957, COS was founded after a special election. Buildings on the current location first opened their doors on September 8, 1959. Facilities at the Weed Campus include Herschel Meredith Stadium for football and track and field events, Tom Powers Court at Eagle Gymnasium for basketball and volleyball events, John Mazzei Field for baseball events, Kenneth W. Ford Theater for musical and theatrical performances, tactical training center and five-story fire training tower, two-story science complex, two on-campus resident lodges; and in Yreka, the Rural Health Science Institute and Training Center. COS also is known for its administration of justice program, paramedic program, nursing program, and fire academy, considered by many to be the best in California.

It has been fully accredited by the Western Association of Schools and Colleges since 1961, the Fire/Emergency Response Technology Program is approved by the State Fire Marshal's Office, and the Emergency Medical Technician, Licensed Vocational Nursing and Registered Nursing Programs are accredited by the proper state agencies.

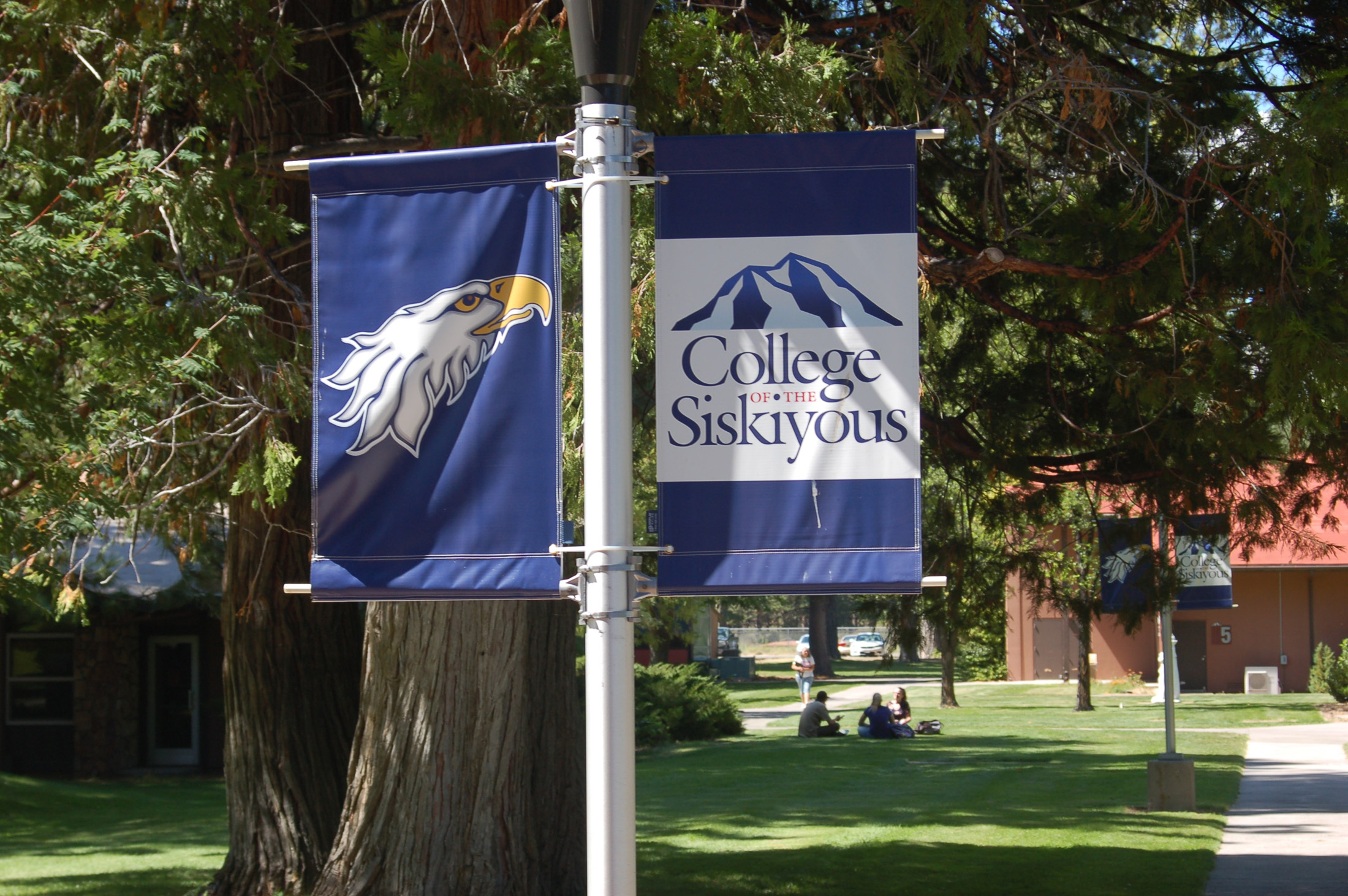
College of the Siskiyous, Weed, California

A common misconception about COS is that it is named after Siskiyou County. But it is actually named after the Siskiyou Mountains, a mountain range that runs along the California-Oregon border, which is referred to as "the Siskiyous" (referenced in the plural form, instead of singular). Siskiyou County is located in far northern California, approximately 30 miles south of the Oregon border, with a population of about 45,000 residents.

The current president of COS is Char Perlas.

== Athletics ==
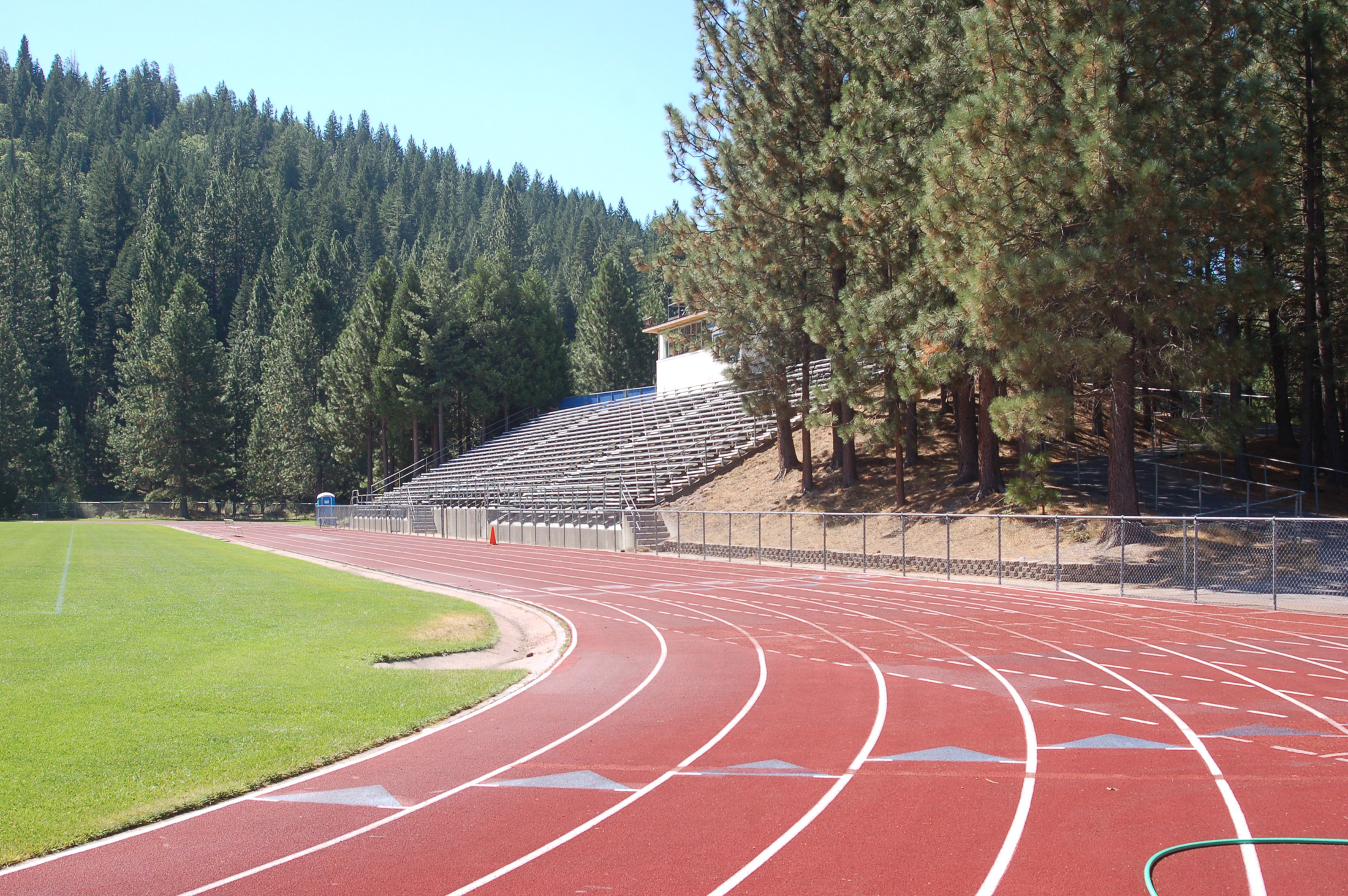
Herschel Meredith Stadium, College of the Siskiyous, Weed, California

College of the Siskiyous athletic mascot is the Eagle. COS offers student intercollegiate athletic competition in a number of sports. Women's collegiate sports include: basketball, softball, cross country, track, soccer, and volleyball. Men's collegiate sports include: baseball, basketball, cross country, soccer, track, and football. Under the direction of former Head Football Coach, Charlie Roche (now the current athletic director), the Football team was the 2012 winner of the Top of the State Bowl. For two consecutive years (2012 and 2013), the football team was conference champion of the Mid Empire Football league and was host of the Top of the State Bowl Game (Central Division Championship football game). In 2014, COS hosted and won the North State Bowl Game, against Shasta College of Redding, California. In 2017, the Eagle Football team finished conference with a record of 8–2, winning all five of their home games. The COS Women's Basketball team is also widely known for its program. Under the direction of long-time Head Coach Tom Powers (who retired in May 2020), the Women's Basketball team was the Golden Valley Conference Champion for eight consecutive years and in 2017 was the California Community College State Runner-up in Women's Basketball.

== Alumni ==
- Mark Acre, Major League Baseball player
- Demario Ballard, Canadian Football League football player
- Adris De León, professional basketball player
- Emilio Fraietta, Canadian Football League football player and Grey Cup champion
- Daniel Hardy, National Football League football player
- Dan Hawkins, college football coach
- Paul Pearson, Canadian Football League football player and Grey Cup champion.
- Bob Rosenstiel, National Football League football player
- Duke Schamel, National Football League football player
- Rob Smith, Canadian Football League football player and Grey Cup champion.
- Chris Szarka, Canadian Football League football player and Grey Cup champion
- Myke Tavarres, National Football League football player
- Darren Yewchyn, Canadian Football League football player and Grey Cup champion
