= Lake Tahoe Community College =

Public college in South Lake Tahoe, California, US

- Type: Public community college
- Established: 1975
- President: Jeff DeFranco
- Location: South Lake Tahoe, California, United States; 38°55′34″N 119°58′19″W
- Website: www.ltcc.edu

Lake Tahoe Community College (LTCC) is a public community college in South Lake Tahoe, California. It was established in 1975. At an altitude of 6,229 feet (1,899 m), it is at the highest elevation of any college in the state.

== History ==
Lake Tahoe Unified School District voters approved the formation of a community College District, with 66% of the vote on March 5, 1974. In September 1975, the college admitted the first 1,407 students. The college opened without a campus; students attended classes at a closed-down local motel facility located on Lake Tahoe Boulevard. The college offered 119 classes, most with ten students or fewer, and the class catalog totaled a few typewritten pages.

The college now serves approximately 2,900 students every quarter.

== Facilities ==
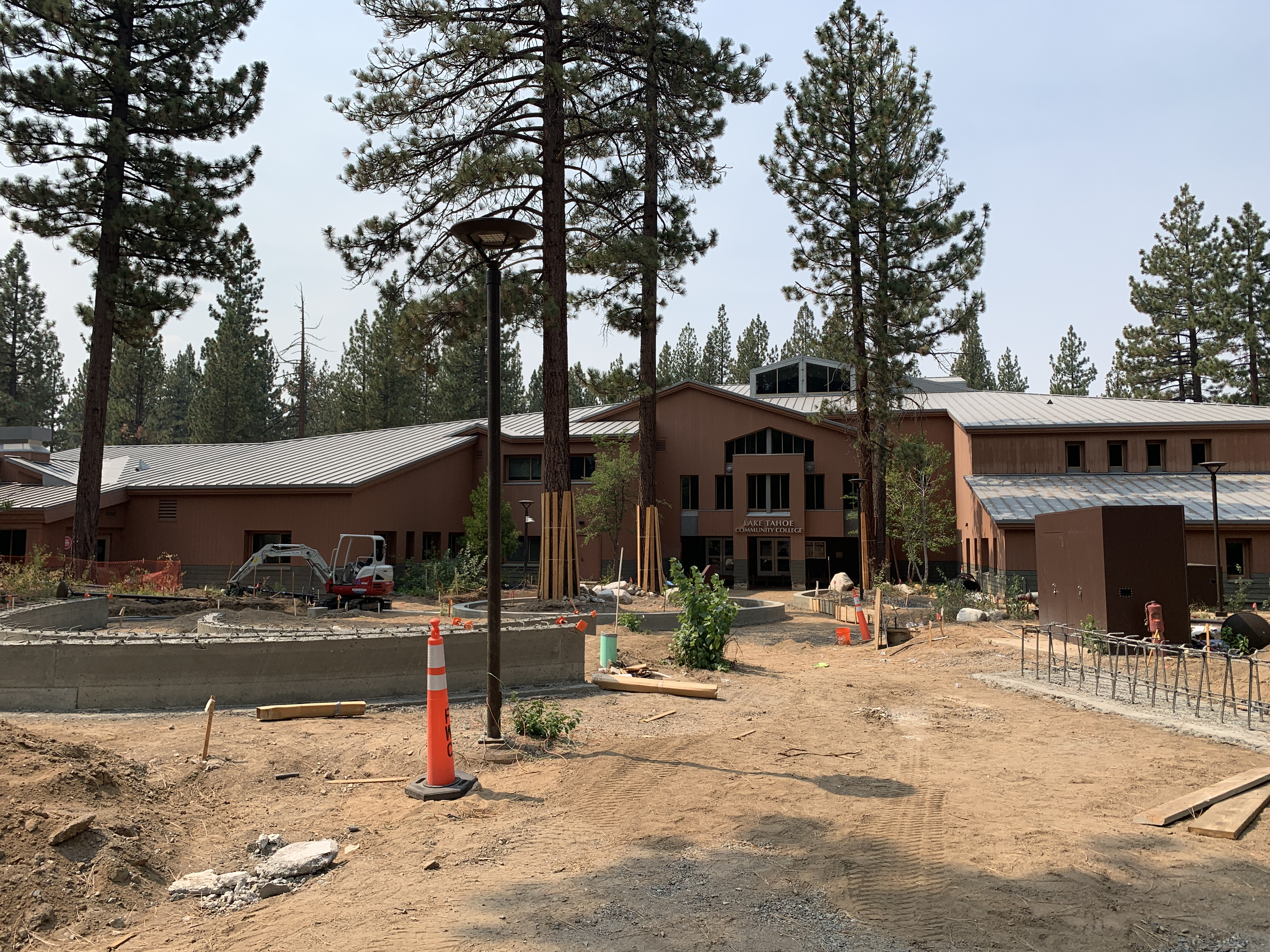

The Duke Theatre at Lake Tahoe Community College

The 164-acre (0.66 km^{2}) campus contains a 192-seat black box theater; science, computer, and art labs; a 26,000-square-foot (2,400 m^{2}) gymnasium; a demonstration garden; and a 27,000-square-foot (2,500 m^{2}) library and art gallery, which opened in September 2006. A student center that includes a cafe and teaching kitchens for the culinary arts program opened in 2002.

== Academics ==
LTCC offers associate degrees and associate in arts and science transfer degrees for matriculation to four-year institutions. The college also offers career and technical certificates. The college calendar is based on the quarter system, with each quarter 12 weeks long. Following the three quarters of the academic year (Fall, Winter, Spring), there is a six-week summer session.

Equivalent and transferable courses successfully completed at LTCC are given full credit by the University of California and California State University systems. LTCC also offers various financial aid opportunities such as the Board of Governors (BOG) Fee Waiver.

== Student life ==
Extra-curricular campus activities at LTCC include athletics, student government, and student clubs.

=== Athletics ===
The college mascot is a coyote, changed in 2014 from the Kokanee salmon. The new mascot was approved in 2014 in preparation for the new college soccer programs.

LTCC has a men's and women's intercollegiate athletics soccer program. Both programs started in Fall 2014. In 2015, LTCC men's soccer went to the California Community Colleges final four.

=== Student government ===
The students of Lake Tahoe Community College have established a student body association named Associated Students of LTCC. The association is required by law to "encourage students to participate in the governance of the college".

The governing body of the association is known as the Student Senate of LTCC. The Student Senate serves as the students' voices as well as promoting student life on campus through advocacy projects. A goal of the Student Senate is to "motivate students to participate in policy making that affects their education".

Associated Students of LTCC is a voting member of a statewide community college student organization named Student Senate for California Community Colleges. The statewide Student Senate is authorized by law "to advocate before the Legislature and other state and local governmental entities".

=== Student clubs ===
Academic clubs for students include Alpha Gamma Sigma (Honor Society), Art Club, Geology Club, Math Club, Engineering Club and Science Club.

Social clubs include ALLY CLub, Circle K - Kiwanis Service Club, Filipino Club, Future Business Leaders of Tahoe, H.O.P.E (Hispanos Orgullosos Preperándose Para La Excelenia), and International Club.

Sports clubs include Badminton Club, Soccer, Table Tennis, and Volleyball Club.

== Accreditation ==
The college is accredited by the Accrediting Commission for Community and Junior Colleges.
