= Shasta College =

Community college in Redding, California, US

Coordinates: 40.625°N 122.318°W

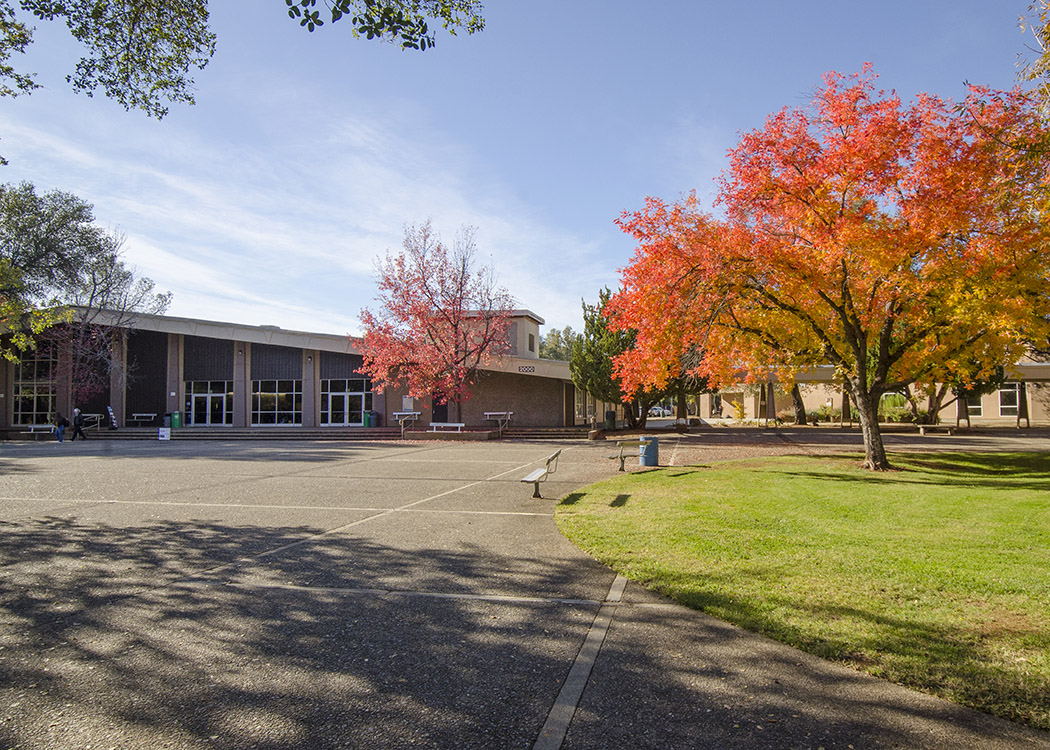
- Shasta College Main Campus Quad
- Type: Public community college
- Established: 1950
- President: Frank Nigro
- Students: 10090 (2025-2026)
- Location: Redding, California, United States
- Colors: Green, white & gray
- Mascot: Knight
- Website: www.shastacollege.edu

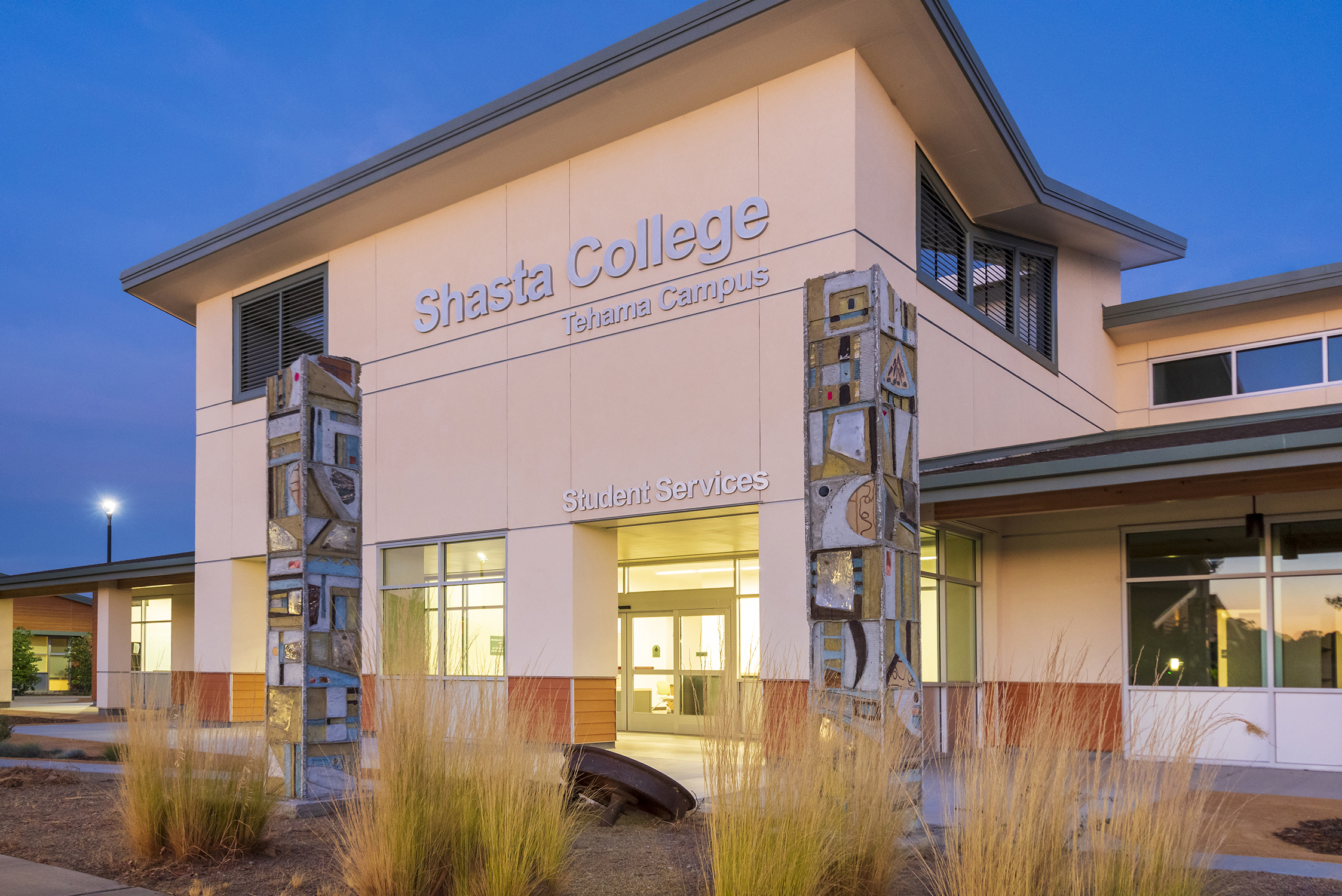
Shasta College Tehama Campus

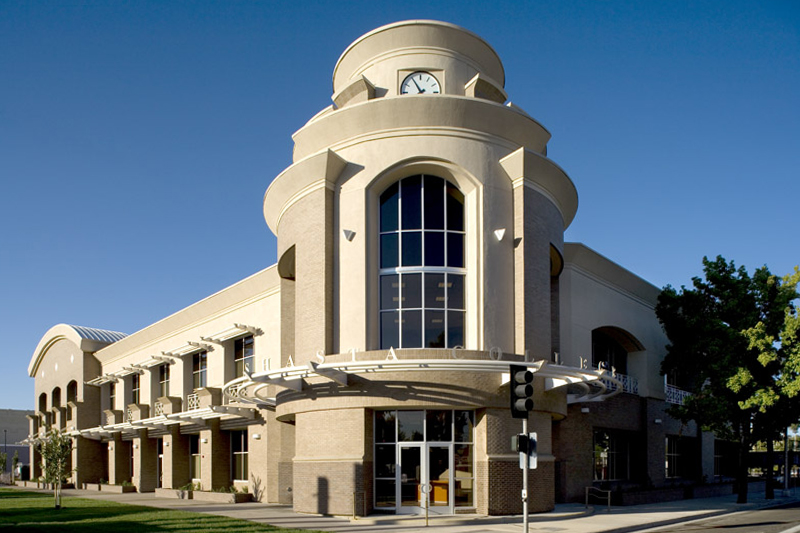
Shasta College Health Science University Center

Shasta College is a public community college in Redding, California, with branch campuses in Burney, Weaverville, and Red Bluff. It was founded in 1950 and later moved to a much larger campus while the original campus became the new location of Shasta High School.

Shasta College has approximately 14,541 students of all ages, including traditional college students, concurrently-enrolled high school students, older, re-entry students, and continuing education students who are simply taking classes for fun. The college has a wide variety of transfer-level and pre-transfer-level classes and programs as well as vocational programs. Many recent high school graduates attend college in order to transfer to universities after two years. Though many students commute to the college from their homes, the college is one of the few California Community Colleges with a dormitory. Shasta College has a strong athletic program offering numerous sports programs. The school mascot is a Knight.

Shasta College is perhaps best known for its music department, which includes a symphony orchestra, band, choir, music theory, piano, and guitar classes. It is home to a community band that with over 100 members is one of the largest in the United States.

On August 20, 2007, Shasta College opened its doors to the new Health Sciences & University Center in Downtown Redding. It is a subsidiary of CSU Chico, the Oregon Institute of Technology, and Southern Oregon University.

== Student government ==
The students of Shasta College have established a student body association named Shasta College Student Senate. The association is required by law to "encourage students to participate in the governance of the college".

The Student Senate periodically participates in meetings sponsored by a statewide community college student organization named Student Senate for California Community Colleges. The statewide Student Senate is authorized by law "to advocate before the Legislature and other state and local governmental entities".

== Notable alumni and faculty ==
- Rick Bosetti, professional baseball player
- Pearl Kiyawn Nageak Brower, Iñupiat academic administrator
- Tony D'Souza, author
- Heather Hadwick, politician
- Brian Jones, professional football player
- Bill Plummer, professional baseball player
- Ricky Ray, professional football player
- Jason Sehorn, professional football player
- Ken Shamrock, professional football player, mixed martial artist, and professional wrestler
- Terry Riley, composer
- James Whalen, professional football player
- Jay Johnson, college baseball coach
- Michael Zagaris, sports photographer
- Christopher Chase-Dunn, sociologist
