= College of the Redwoods =

Community college in Eureka, California, US

Coordinates: 40°41′52″N 124°11′54″W

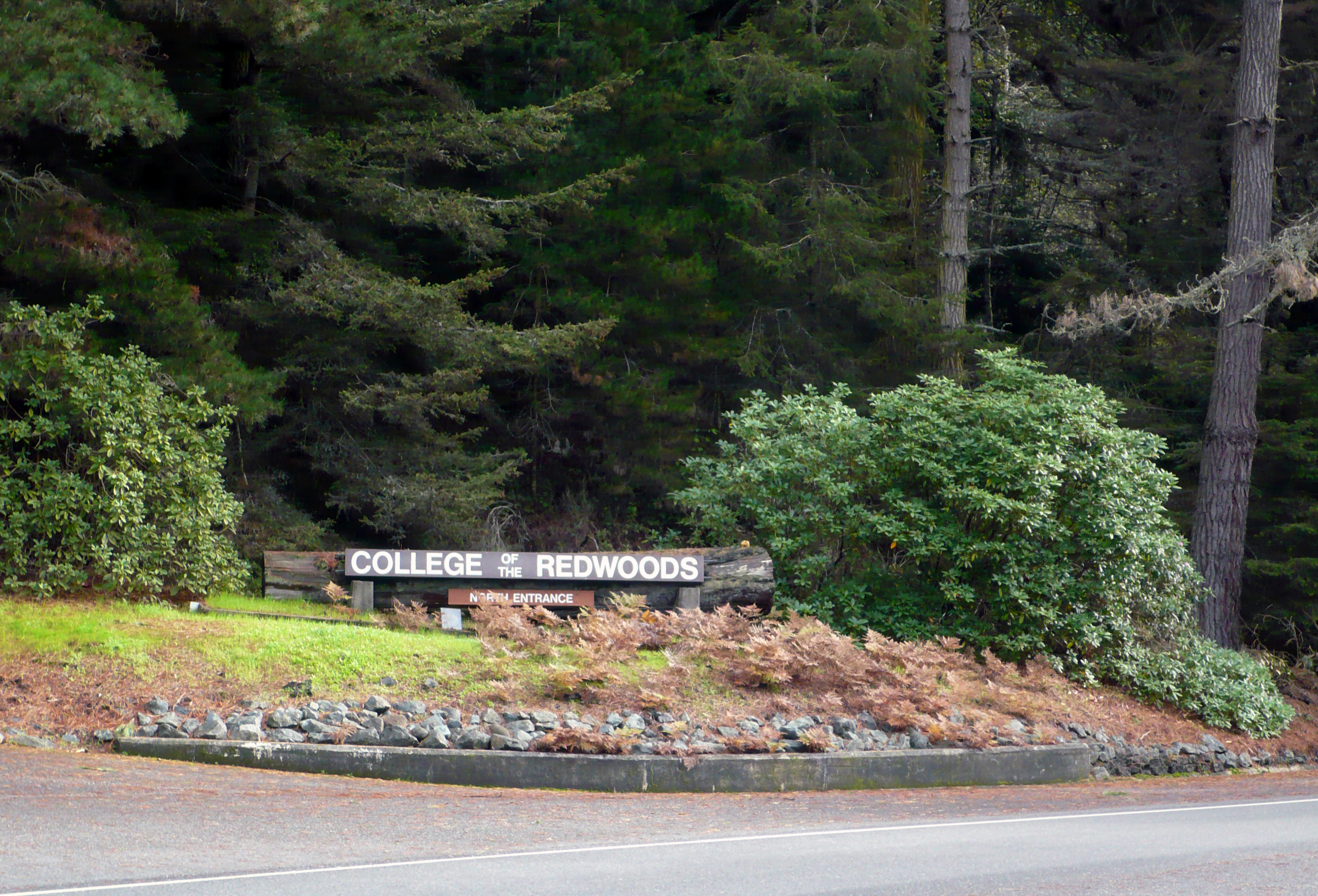
- College of the Redwoods North Entry
- Type: Public community college
- Established: 1964
- Parent institution: California Community Colleges
- Affiliations: 3C2A
- President: Keith Flamer
- Total staff: 561
- Students: 6,409 credit, 1,196 non-credit students in FY 2018–2019
- Location: Eureka, California, United States
- Campus: Rural: Three main educational sites, six off-campus sites, which include 449,948 square feet (41,802 m^{2}) of buildings sitting on 334 acres (1.4 km^{2}) (2011).
- Nickname: Corsair
- Website: www.redwoods.edu

College of the Redwoods (CR) is a public community college with its main campus south of Eureka, California, United States. It is part of the California Community Colleges System and serves three counties. It has two branch campuses, as well as three additional sites. It is one of twelve community colleges in California that offer on-campus housing for students.

In autumn of 2022, the school had 3,891 students of whom 1,211 were full-time. The school uses "a semester-based academic year". With a student-faculty ratio of 16-to-1, the school offers associate degrees. The school "has an open admissions policy and offers credit for life experiences".

According to U.S. News, "the in-state tuition and fees for 2020-2021 were $1,147, and out-of-state tuition and fees were $8,539. There is no application fee."

== History ==
The original Redwoods Community College District was formed in 1964 by a vote of the people of Humboldt County. Founding President Eugene J. Portugal and his wife Dottie Portugal shaped the look of the campus. In 1975, residents of the coastal portion of Mendocino County voted to join the District, and in 1978 Del Norte County similarly joined. The college serves these areas, as well as a portion of Trinity County.

In 2012, College of the Redwoods' regional accreditor Accrediting Commission for Community and Junior Colleges (ACCJC) placed the college on "Show Cause" status, warning the college that its accreditation might be withdrawn. Two years later it removed the college from probation and reaffirmed its accreditation.

=== Finances ===
Beginning with the passage of Proposition 13 by California in 1978, College of the Redwoods and most public institutions in the state have suffered declining revenue. This has continued following the Dot-Com Bust. Simultaneously the college suffered increasing costs due to inflation, population growth, and increasingly unfunded state and federal mandates. In 2006, voters passed Bond Measure Q/B (Ballot Measure Q in Humboldt, northwest Mendocino and western Trinity counties; Ballot Measure B in Del Norte County) to allow issuance of $40,320,000 in bond funding to upgrade and renovate facilities at the main campus south of Eureka and the branch campuses in Crescent City and Fort Bragg. Measure Q Bond Funds were also used to acquire the Garberville Site in Southern Humboldt County.

== Academics ==
College of the Redwoods awards Associate of Arts and Associate of Science Degrees as well as a wide variety of career technical certificates for vocational and professional development. Degrees or certificates are available in 54 fields of study, the most popular are Biological and Physical Sciences, Humanities/Humanistic Studies, and Liberal Arts and Sciences/Liberal Studies.

== Satellite campuses ==
College of the Redwoods (CR) has satellite branch campuses; CR Del Norte in Crescent City, Del Norte County and the Klamath-Trinity Instructional Site on the Hoopa Valley Tribe reservation. Adult Education and Workforce and Community Education programs are through the Eureka, California downtown site. It also runs classes at the College of the Redwoods' Certified Organic Farm in Shively, California. CR serves incarcerated students at Pelican Bay State Prison.

== Administration ==
The college is part of the Redwoods Community College District, itself part of the California Community Colleges System. The district is governed by an elected seven-member Board of Trustees.

== Notable alumni ==
- Mike Bettiga (born 1950), professional football player
- Ashley Eriksmoen, (class of 1998), furniture maker and educator
- Dave Harper, (class of 1986), professional football player
- Bryan Malessa (class of 1993), novelist
- Michael Moore, saxophonist and clarinetist, member of the Instant Composers Pool
- John James Nazarian (born 1952), celebrity private investigator
- Randy Niemann, (class of 1975), professional baseball player
- Jason Romero, (class of 1999), Banjo luthier and Juno award-winning performer
- Carmelita Little Turtle (born 1952), Apache/Rarámuri photographer

== Points of interest ==
- Humboldt Botanical Garden
