= Camino Norte Conference =

Junior college athletic conference in California

The Camino Norte Conference was a junior college athletic conference with member schools located in the San Francisco Bay Area. The conference was formed in 1968 with eight initial members, two of which were newly established schools: Cañada College and Skyline College. De Anza College, Solano Community College, and West Valley College joined from the Coast Conference. The College of Marin and Santa Rosa Junior College moved in from the Golden Valley Conference, and Contra Costa College was formerly a member of the Golden Gate Conference. The conference was disbanded after the 1993–94 athletic year.

== Yearly football standings ==
1968 Camino Norte Conference football standings
	Conf.					Overall
Team	W		L		T	W		L		T
Marin +^	4	–	1	–	0	7	–	3	–	0
De Anza +^	4	–	1	–	0	5	–	5	–	0
West Valley	3	–	2	–	0	6	–	3	–	0
Contra Costa	3	–	2	–	0	5	–	4	–	0
Solano	1	–	4	–	0	3	–	6	–	0
Santa Rosa	0	–	5	–	0	3	–	6	–	0
+ – Conference co-champions; ^ – California state junior college large division playoff participant

1969 Camino Norte Conference football standings
	Conf.					Overall
Team	W		L		T	W		L		T
West Valley $^	5	–	0	–	0	9	–	1	–	0
Contra Costa	4	–	1	–	0	6	–	3	–	0
Marin	3	–	2	–	0	4	–	4	–	0
Santa Rosa	2	–	3	–	0	5	–	4	–	0
Solano	1	–	4	–	0	3	–	6	–	0
De Anza	0	–	5	–	0	0	–	9	–	0
$ – Conference champion; ^ – California state junior college large division playoff participant De Anza forfeited all five confernece games.

1970 Camino Norte Conference football standings
	Conf.					Overall
Team	W		L		T	W		L		T
West Valley $^	5	–	0	–	0	9	–	1	–	0
Santa Rosa	4	–	1	–	0	7	–	2	–	0
De Anza	3	–	2	–	0	4	–	5	–	0
Solano	2	–	3	–	0	4	–	5	–	0
Contra Costa	1	–	4	–	0	1	–	8	–	0
Marin	0	–	5	–	0	1	–	8	–	0
$ – Conference champion; ^ – California state junior college large division playoff participant

1971 Camino Norte Conference football standings
	Conf.					Overall
Team	W		L		T	W		L		T
Santa Rosa +^	4	–	1	–	0	10	–	2	–	0
West Valley +	4	–	1	–	0	7	–	2	–	0
Contra Costa	3	–	2	–	0	4	–	4	–	1
De Anza	3	–	2	–	0	4	–	5	–	0
Solano	1	–	4	–	0	5	–	4	–	0
Marin	0	–	5	–	0	0	–	9	–	0
$ – Conference champion; ^ – California state junior college large division playoff participant

1972 Camino Norte Conference football standings
	Conf.					Overall
Team	W		L		T	W		L		T
West Valley +	4	–	1	–	0	5	–	5	–	0
De Anza +^	4	–	1	–	0	?	–	?	–	?
Santa Rosa	3	–	2	–	0	?	–	?	–	?
Contra Costa	2	–	2	–	1	?	–	?	–	?
Solano	1	–	3	–	1	?	–	?	–	?
Marin	0	–	5	–	0	?	–	?	–	?
+ – Conference co-champions; ^ – California state junior college large division playoff participant

1973 Camino Norte Conference football standings
	Conf.					Overall
Team	W		L		T	W		L		T
De Anza +	5	–	1	–	0	6	–	4	–	0
Contra Costa +^	5	–	1	–	0	6	–	5	–	0
Santa Rosa	3	–	3	–	0	6	–	4	–	0
Foothill	3	–	3	–	0	3	–	7	–	0
West Valley	3	–	3	–	0	3	–	7	–	0
Marin	2	–	4	–	0	4	–	5	–	0
Solano	0	–	6	–	0	1	–	9	–	0
+ – Conference co-champions; ^ – California state junior college large division playoff participant

1974 Camino Norte Conference football standings
	Conf.					Overall
Team	W		L		T	W		L		T
Santa Rosa $^	5	–	0	–	0	7	–	3	–	0
Contra Costa	3	–	1	–	1	6	–	2	–	1
Los Medanos	3	–	2	–	0	6	–	4	–	0
Solano	1	–	3	–	1	2	–	7	–	1
Marin	1	–	4	–	0	2	–	8	–	0
Merritt	1	–	4	–	0	2	–	8	–	0
$ – Conference champion; ^ – California state junior college Division II playoff participant

1975 Camino Norte Conference football standings
	Conf.					Overall
Team	W		L		T	W		L		T
Contra Costa +	4	–	1	–	0	8	–	2	–	0
Los Medanos +	4	–	1	–	0	7	–	3	–	0
Santa Rosa	3	–	2	–	0	7	–	3	–	0
Marin	2	–	3	–	0	5	–	4	–	0
Solano	2	–	3	–	0	5	–	5	–	0
Merritt	0	–	5	–	0	2	–	7	–	0
+ – Conference co-champions

1976 Camino Norte Conference football standings
	Conf.					Overall
Team	W		L		T	W		L		T
Santa Rosa +	4	–	1	–	0	6	–	3	–	1
Contra Costa +	4	–	1	–	0	6	–	4	–	0
Solano +	4	–	1	–	0	5	–	4	–	0
Marin	1	–	4	–	0	3	–	6	–	0
Los Medanos	1	–	4	–	0	2	–	6	–	1
Merritt	1	–	4	–	0	2	–	7	–	0
+ – Conference co-champions

1977 Camino Norte Conference football standings
	Conf.					Overall
Team	W		L		T	W		L		T
Los Medanos +	5	–	1	–	0	7	–	2	–	0
Santa Rosa +	5	–	1	–	0	8	–	3	–	0
Contra Costa +	5	–	1	–	0	5	–	3	–	1
Solano	3	–	3	–	0	3	–	6	–	0
Napa	2	–	4	–	0	3	–	7	–	0
Merritt	1	–	5	–	0	1	–	8	–	0
Marin	0	–	6	–	0	0	–	9	–	0
+ – Conference co-champions

1978 Camino Norte Conference football standings
	Conf.					Overall
Team	W		L		T	W		L		T
Santa Rosa $	4	–	0	–	0	10	–	1	–	0
Contra Costa	3	–	1	–	0	7	–	2	–	0
Los Medanos	2	–	2	–	0	3	–	6	–	0
Solano	1	–	3	–	0	2	–	6	–	0
Marin	0	–	4	–	0	0	–	8	–	0
$ – Conference champion

1979 Camino Norte Conference football standings
	Conf.					Overall
Team	W		L		T	W		L		T
Contra Costa $	5	–	0	–	0	7	–	3	–	0
Santa Rosa	4	–	1	–	0	8	–	2	–	0
Solano	2	–	3	–	0	3	–	6	–	0
Napa	2	–	3	–	0	3	–	7	–	0
Los Medanos	1	–	4	–	0	1	–	8	–	0
Marin	1	–	4	–	0	1	–	9	–	0
$ – Conference champion

1984 Camino Norte Conference football standings
	Conf.					Overall
Team	W		L		T	W		L		T
Santa Rosa +	8	–	1	–	0	9	–	1	–	1
Sacramento City +	8	–	1	–	0	10	–	2	–	0
Contra Costa	7	–	2	–	0	8	–	3	–	0
Merritt	5	–	4	–	0	5	–	6	–	0
Los Medanos	4	–	5	–	0	4	–	7	–	0
American River	3	–	5	–	1	3	–	7	–	1
San Joaquin Delta	3	–	5	–	1	3	–	7	–	1
Solano	3	–	6	–	0	4	–	7	–	0
Napa	2	–	7	–	0	2	–	9	–	0
Marin	1	–	8	–	0	2	–	9	–	0
+ – Conference co-champions

1981 Camino Norte Conference football standings
	Conf.					Overall
Team	W		L		T	W		L		T
Sacramento City $	7	–	0	–	0	11	–	0	–	0
Contra Costa	6	–	1	–	0	9	–	1	–	0
San Joaquin Delta	4	–	3	–	0	5	–	4	–	1
Santa Rosa	4	–	3	–	0	7	–	3	–	0
Merritt	2	–	4	–	1	4	–	5	–	1
Los Medanos	2	–	5	–	0	3	–	7	–	0
American River	1	–	5	–	1	2	–	7	–	1
Diablo Valley	0	–	7	–	0	1	–	8	–	0
$ – Conference champion

1982 Camino Norte Conference football standings
	Conf.					Overall
Team	W		L		T	W		L		T
Sacramento City $	7	–	0	–	0	11	–	0	–	0
Santa Rosa	6	–	1	–	0	8	–	3	–	0
Contra Costa	5	–	2	–	0	7	–	3	–	0
Merritt	3	–	4	–	0	3	–	7	–	0
American River	2	–	5	–	0	2	–	8	–	0
Diablo Valley	2	–	5	–	0	2	–	8	–	0
Los Medanos	2	–	5	–	0	2	–	8	–	0
San Joaquin Delta	1	–	6	–	0	1	–	9	–	0
$ – Conference champion

1983 Camino Norte Conference football standings
	Conf.					Overall
Team	W		L		T	W		L		T
Sacramento City $	6	–	0	–	0	10	–	1	–	0
San Joaquin Delta	5	–	1	–	0	5	–	5	–	0
Contra Costa	4	–	2	–	0	6	–	4	–	0
Diablo Valley	3	–	3	–	0	4	–	6	–	0
Santa Rosa	2	–	4	–	0	3	–	7	–	0
Merritt	1	–	5	–	0	2	–	8	–	0
American River	0	–	6	–	0	1	–	9	–	0
$ – Conference champion

1984 Camino Norte Conference football standings
	Conf.					Overall
Team	W		L		T	W		L		T
Santa Rosa $	5	–	0	–	1	9	–	1	–	1
Sacramento City	5	–	1	–	0	9	–	2	–	0
Contra Costa	4	–	2	–	0	6	–	4	–	0
Merritt	3	–	3	–	0	4	–	6	–	0
Modesto	2	–	4	–	0	3	–	7	–	0
San Joaquin Delta *	1	–	5	–	0	3	–	7	–	0
American River	0	–	5	–	1	2	–	7	–	1
$ – Conference champion; * – San Joaquin Delta forfeited conference games—to Santa Rosa, Contra Costa, and Merritt—and two non-conference games.

1985 Camino Norte Conference football standings
	Conf.					Overall
Team	W		L		T	W		L		T
Santa Rosa $	6	–	0	–	0	10	–	0	–	1
Sacramento City	5	–	1	–	0	8	–	2	–	0
Modesto	4	–	2	–	0	7	–	3	–	0
San Joaquin Delta	3	–	3	–	0	5	–	4	–	1
American River	2	–	4	–	0	4	–	6	–	0
Contra Costa	1	–	5	–	0	4	–	6	–	0
Merritt	0	–	6	–	0	0	–	10	–	0
$ – Conference champion

1986 Camino Norte Conference football standings
	Conf.					Overall
Team	W		L		T	W		L		T
Sacramento City $	5	–	0	–	0	10	–	0	–	1
Merced	3	–	2	–	0	8	–	3	–	0
Santa Rosa	3	–	2	–	0	6	–	4	–	0
Modesto	2	–	3	–	0	4	–	5	–	0
American River	1	–	4	–	0	5	–	5	–	0
San Joaquin Delta	1	–	4	–	0	3	–	7	–	0
$ – Conference champion

1987 Camino Norte Conference football standings
	Conf.					Overall
Team	W		L		T	W		L		T
Sacramento City $	5	–	0	–	0	8	–	2	–	0
Merced	4	–	1	–	0	7	–	4	–	0
San Joaquin Delta	3	–	2	–	0	7	–	3	–	0
American River	2	–	3	–	0	7	–	3	–	0
Santa Rosa	1	–	4	–	0	2	–	7	–	0
Modesto	0	–	5	–	0	2	–	8	–	0
$ – Conference champion

1988 Camino Norte Conference football standings
	Conf.					Overall
Team	W		L		T	W		L		T
Merced $	5	–	0	–	0	9	–	2	–	0
American River	3	–	1	–	1	7	–	3	–	1
Sacramento City	2	–	2	–	1	5	–	4	–	1
Santa Rosa	2	–	3	–	0	5	–	5	–	0
San Joaquin Delta	2	–	3	–	0	3	–	7	–	0
Modesto	0	–	5	–	0	2	–	8	–	0
$ – Conference champion

1989 Camino Norte Conference football standings
	Conf.					Overall
Team	W		L		T	W		L		T
American River +	4	–	1	–	0	9	–	2	–	0
Sacramento City +	4	–	1	–	0	8	–	3	–	0
Santa Rosa	3	–	2	–	0	7	–	3	–	0
Merced	3	–	2	–	0	6	–	4	–	0
San Joaquin Delta	1	–	4	–	0	3	–	6	–	0
Modesto	0	–	5	–	0	1	–	8	–	0
+ – Conference co-champions
