= Coast Conference =

U.S. college athletic conference

The Coast Conference is a college athletic conference that is affiliated with the California Community College Athletic Association. Its members are primarily based in the Southern San Francisco Bay Area region.

== Members ==
The league currently has 17 full members:

| Institution | Location | Founded | Enrollment |
|---|---|---|---|
| Cabrillo College | Aptos, California | 1959 | 14,400 |
| Cañada College | Redwood City, California | 1968 | 6,900 |
| Chabot College | Hayward, California | 1961 | 13,150 |
| De Anza College | Cupertino, California | 1967 | 21,500 |
| Evergreen Valley College | San Jose, California | 1975 | 8,000 |
| Foothill College | Los Altos Hills, California | 1957 | 13,600 |
| Gavilan College | Gilroy, California | 1919 | 7,300 |
| Hartnell College | Salinas, California | 1920 | 10,000 |
| Las Positas College | Livermore, California | 1963 | 8,350 |
| Mission College | Santa Clara, California | 1967 | 10,200 |
| Monterey Peninsula College | Monterey, California | 1947 | 6,100 |
| Ohlone College | Fremont, California | 1965 | 11,500 |
| City College of San Francisco | San Francisco, California | 1935 | 33,150 |
| San Jose City College | San Jose, California | 1921 | 10,100 |
| College of San Mateo | San Mateo, California | 1922 | 9,400 |
| Skyline College | San Bruno, California | 1960 | 17,000 |
| West Valley College | Saratoga, California | 1963 | 14,000 |

== Yearly football standings ==
1951 Coast Conference football standings
| | Conf. | | | | | Overall |
| Team | W | | L | | T | W | | L | | T |
|---|---|---|---|---|---|---|---|---|---|---|
| Menlo $ | 4 | – | 0 | – | 0 | 8 | – | 0 | – | 0 |
| East Contra Costa | 2 | – | 2 | – | 0 | 4 | – | 5 | – | 0 |
| Monterey Peninsula | 2 | – | 2 | – | 0 | 4 | – | 6 | – | 0 |
| Hartnell | 2 | – | 2 | – | 0 | 3 | – | 6 | – | 0 |
| Marin | 0 | – | 4 | – | 0 | 1 | – | 8 | – | 0 |
$ – Conference champion

1952 Coast Conference football standings
| | Conf. | | | | | Overall |
| Team | W | | L | | T | W | | L | | T |
|---|---|---|---|---|---|---|---|---|---|---|
| Hartnell $ | 4 | – | 0 | – | 0 | 10 | – | 0 | – | 1 |
| East Contra Costa | 3 | – | 1 | – | 0 | 8 | – | 1 | – | 0 |
| Menlo | 2 | – | 2 | – | 0 | 4 | – | 3 | – | 1 |
| Monterey Peninsula | 1 | – | 3 | – | 0 | 5 | – | 4 | – | 0 |
| Marin | 0 | – | 4 | – | 0 | 2 | – | 7 | – | 0 |
$ – Conference champion

1953 Coast Conference football standings
| | Conf. | | | | | Overall |
| Team | W | | L | | T | W | | L | | T |
|---|---|---|---|---|---|---|---|---|---|---|
| Hartnell $ | 4 | – | 0 | – | 0 | 10 | – | 0 | – | 0 |
| Marin | 2 | – | 2 | – | 0 | 7 | – | 2 | – | 0 |
| Menlo | 2 | – | 2 | – | 0 | 5 | – | 3 | – | 0 |
| Monterey Peninsula | 2 | – | 2 | – | 0 | 4 | – | 5 | – | 1 |
| East Contra Costa | 0 | – | 4 | – | 0 | 4 | – | 4 | – | 0 |
$ – Conference champion

1954 Coast Conference football standings
| | Conf. | | | | | Overall |
| Team | W | | L | | T | W | | L | | T |
|---|---|---|---|---|---|---|---|---|---|---|
| Menlo $ | 4 | – | 0 | – | 0 | 7 | – | 1 | – | 0 |
| Monterey Peninsula | 2 | – | 2 | – | 0 | 5 | – | 3 | – | 1 |
| San Jose City | 2 | – | 2 | – | 0 | 5 | – | 4 | – | 0 |
| Hartnell | 2 | – | 2 | – | 0 | 3 | – | 6 | – | 0 |
| East Contra Costa | 0 | – | 4 | – | 0 | 4 | – | 4 | – | 0 |
$ – Conference champion

1955 Coast Conference football standings
| | Conf. | | | | | Overall |
| Team | W | | L | | T | W | | L | | T |
|---|---|---|---|---|---|---|---|---|---|---|
| Menlo $ | 3 | – | 0 | – | 1 | 7 | – | 0 | – | 1 |
| Hartnell | 2 | – | 0 | – | 2 | 4 | – | 4 | – | 2 |
| Monterey Peninsula | 2 | – | 2 | – | 0 | 9 | – | 2 | – | 0 |
| San Jose City | 1 | – | 2 | – | 1 | 1 | – | 6 | – | 2 |
| East Contra Costa | 0 | – | 4 | – | 0 | 2 | – | 6 | – | 1 |
$ – Conference champion

1956 Coast Conference football standings
| | Conf. | | | | | Overall |
| Team | W | | L | | T | W | | L | | T |
|---|---|---|---|---|---|---|---|---|---|---|
| San Jose City $ | 4 | – | 0 | – | 0 | 7 | – | 1 | – | 1 |
| Menlo | 4 | – | 1 | – | 0 | 7 | – | 2 | – | 0 |
| East Contra Costa | 2 | – | 2 | – | 1 | 5 | – | 3 | – | 1 |
| Monterey Peninsula | 2 | – | 2 | – | 1 | 4 | – | 4 | – | 1 |
| Vallejo | 1 | – | 3 | – | 0 | 4 | – | 5 | – | 0 |
| Hartnell | 0 | – | 5 | – | 0 | 1 | – | 8 | – | 1 |
$ – Conference champion

1957 Coast Conference football standings
| | Conf. | | | | | Overall |
| Team | W | | L | | T | W | | L | | T |
|---|---|---|---|---|---|---|---|---|---|---|
| Vallejo $ | 4 | – | 1 | – | 0 | 7 | – | 2 | – | 0 |
| San Jose City | 3 | – | 2 | – | 0 | 6 | – | 3 | – | 0 |
| East Contra Costa | 3 | – | 2 | – | 0 | 3 | – | 6 | – | 0 |
| Monterey Peninsula | 3 | – | 2 | – | 0 | 4 | – | 5 | – | 0 |
| Hartnell | 2 | – | 3 | – | 0 | 3 | – | 6 | – | 0 |
| Menlo | 0 | – | 5 | – | 0 | 1 | – | 7 | – | 0 |
$ – Conference champion

1958 Coast Conference football standings
| | Conf. | | | | | Overall |
| Team | W | | L | | T | W | | L | | T |
|---|---|---|---|---|---|---|---|---|---|---|
| Hartnell $ | 5 | – | 0 | – | 0 | 9 | – | 0 | – | 0 |
| San Jose City | 4 | – | 1 | – | 0 | 7 | – | 2 | – | 0 |
| Monterey Peninsula | 3 | – | 2 | – | 0 | 7 | – | 2 | – | 0 |
| Vallejo | 2 | – | 3 | – | 0 | 5 | – | 4 | – | 0 |
| Menlo | 1 | – | 4 | – | 0 | 3 | – | 5 | – | 0 |
| Diablo Valley | 0 | – | 5 | – | 0 | 0 | – | 9 | – | 0 |
$ – Conference champion

1959 Coast Conference football standings
| | Conf. | | | | | Overall |
| Team | W | | L | | T | W | | L | | T |
|---|---|---|---|---|---|---|---|---|---|---|
| Monterey Peninsula + | 5 | – | 1 | – | 0 | 9 | – | 1 | – | 0 |
| San Jose City + | 5 | – | 1 | – | 0 | ? | – | ? | – | ? |
| Vallejo | 4 | – | 2 | – | 0 | ? | – | ? | – | ? |
| Hartnell | 4 | – | 2 | – | 0 | ? | – | ? | – | ? |
| Foothill | 2 | – | 4 | – | 0 | 5 | – | 4 | – | 0 |
| Menlo | 1 | – | 5 | – | 0 | 3 | – | 6 | – | 0 |
| Diablo Valley | 0 | – | 6 | – | 0 | ? | – | ? | – | ? |
+ – Conference co-champions

1960 Coast Conference football standings
| | Conf. | | | | | Overall |
| Team | W | | L | | T | W | | L | | T |
|---|---|---|---|---|---|---|---|---|---|---|
| Hartnell $ | 6 | – | 0 | – | 1 | 8 | – | 1 | – | 1 |
| Monterey Peninsula | 6 | – | 1 | – | 0 | 7 | – | 2 | – | 0 |
| San Jose City | 5 | – | 2 | – | 0 | 7 | – | 2 | – | 0 |
| Diablo Valley | 4 | – | 3 | – | 0 | 4 | – | 5 | – | 0 |
| Foothill | 2 | – | 4 | – | 1 | 3 | – | 5 | – | 1 |
| Vallejo | 2 | – | 5 | – | 0 | 2 | – | 7 | – | 0 |
| Cabrillo | 1 | – | 5 | – | 0 | 3 | – | 6 | – | 0 |
| Menlo | 0 | – | 6 | – | 0 | 2 | – | 7 | – | 0 |
$ – Conference champion

1961 Coast Conference football standings
| | Conf. | | | | | Overall |
| Team | W | | L | | T | W | | L | | T |
|---|---|---|---|---|---|---|---|---|---|---|
| Monterey Peninsula $ | 6 | – | 1 | – | 0 | 7 | – | 3 | – | 0 |
| Diablo Valley | 5 | – | 2 | – | 0 | 7 | – | 2 | – | 0 |
| Hartnell | 5 | – | 2 | – | 0 | 7 | – | 3 | – | 0 |
| San Jose City | 4 | – | 3 | – | 0 | 5 | – | 4 | – | 0 |
| Foothill | 4 | – | 3 | – | 0 | 6 | – | 3 | – | 0 |
| Menlo | 2 | – | 5 | – | 0 | 4 | – | 5 | – | 0 |
| Cabrillo | 1 | – | 6 | – | 0 | 1 | – | 8 | – | 0 |
| Vallejo | 1 | – | 6 | – | 0 | 1 | – | 8 | – | 0 |
$ – Conference champion

1962 Coast Conference football standings
| | Conf. | | | | | Overall |
| Team | W | | L | | T | W | | L | | T |
|---|---|---|---|---|---|---|---|---|---|---|
| Hartnell + | 4 | – | 1 | – | 0 | 7 | – | 3 | – | 0 |
| Monterey Peninsula + | 4 | – | 1 | – | 0 | 5 | – | 4 | – | 0 |
| Cabrillo | 3 | – | 2 | – | 0 | 5 | – | 4 | – | 0 |
| Menlo | 2 | – | 3 | – | 0 | 3 | – | 5 | – | 0 |
| San Benito | 2 | – | 3 | – | 0 | 2 | – | 4 | – | 1 |
| Vallejo | 0 | – | 5 | – | 0 | 1 | – | 8 | – | 0 |
+ – Conference co-champions

1963 Coast Conference football standings
| | Conf. | | | | | Overall |
| Team | W | | L | | T | W | | L | | T |
|---|---|---|---|---|---|---|---|---|---|---|
| Hartnell $ | 5 | – | 0 | – | 0 | 8 | – | 2 | – | 0 |
| Cabrillo | 4 | – | 1 | – | 0 | 5 | – | 2 | – | 2 |
| Monterey Peninsula | 3 | – | 2 | – | 0 | 4 | – | 5 | – | 0 |
| Menlo | 2 | – | 3 | – | 0 | 4 | – | 4 | – | 0 |
| Gavilan | 0 | – | 4 | – | 1 | 1 | – | 6 | – | 1 |
| Vallejo | 0 | – | 4 | – | 1 | 0 | – | 7 | – | 1 |
$ – Conference champion

1964 Coast Conference football standings
| | Conf. | | | | | Overall |
| Team | W | | L | | T | W | | L | | T |
|---|---|---|---|---|---|---|---|---|---|---|
| Menlo $ | 5 | – | 0 | – | 0 | 8 | – | 1 | – | 0 |
| Monterey Peninsula | 4 | – | 1 | – | 0 | 7 | – | 3 | – | 0 |
| Vallejo | 3 | – | 2 | – | 0 | 5 | – | 4 | – | 0 |
| Cabrillo | 2 | – | 3 | – | 0 | 3 | – | 6 | – | 0 |
| Hartnell | 1 | – | 4 | – | 0 | 3 | – | 6 | – | 0 |
| Gavilan | 0 | – | 5 | – | 0 | 0 | – | 9 | – | 0 |
$ – Conference champion

1965 Coast Conference football standings
| | Conf. | | | | | Overall |
| Team | W | | L | | T | W | | L | | T |
|---|---|---|---|---|---|---|---|---|---|---|
| Monterey Peninsula $ | 6 | – | 0 | – | 0 | 9 | – | 1 | – | 0 |
| West Valley | 4 | – | 2 | – | 0 | 5 | – | 4 | – | 0 |
| Cabrillo | 4 | – | 2 | – | 0 | 4 | – | 5 | – | 0 |
| Hartnell | 3 | – | 3 | – | 0 | 5 | – | 4 | – | 0 |
| Vallejo | 2 | – | 4 | – | 0 | 2 | – | 6 | – | 1 |
| Menlo | 1 | – | 5 | – | 0 | 3 | – | 6 | – | 0 |
| Gavilan | 1 | – | 5 | – | 0 | 1 | – | 8 | – | 0 |
$ – Conference champion

1966 Coast Conference football standings
| | Conf. | | | | | Overall |
| Team | W | | L | | T | W | | L | | T |
|---|---|---|---|---|---|---|---|---|---|---|
| Laney $ | 7 | – | 0 | – | 0 | 10 | – | 0 | – | 0 |
| Hartnell | 6 | – | 1 | – | 0 | 8 | – | 2 | – | 0 |
| Monterey Peninsula | 5 | – | 2 | – | 0 | 6 | – | 3 | – | 0 |
| West Valley | 3 | – | 4 | – | 0 | 3 | – | 6 | – | 0 |
| Menlo | 2 | – | 5 | – | 0 | 4 | – | 5 | – | 0 |
| Solano | 2 | – | 5 | – | 0 | 3 | – | 6 | – | 0 |
| Gavilan | 2 | – | 5 | – | 0 | 2 | – | 7 | – | 0 |
| Cabrillo | 1 | – | 7 | – | 0 | 2 | – | 7 | – | 0 |
$ – Conference champion

1967 Coast Conference football standings
| | Conf. | | | | | Overall |
| Team | W | | L | | T | W | | L | | T |
|---|---|---|---|---|---|---|---|---|---|---|
| Hartnell +^ | 7 | – | 1 | – | 0 | 9 | – | 1 | – | 1 |
| Monterey Peninsula + | 7 | – | 1 | – | 0 | 7 | – | 2 | – | 0 |
| Laney | 6 | – | 2 | – | 0 | 7 | – | 2 | – | 0 |
| Gavilan | 4 | – | 4 | – | 0 | 5 | – | 4 | – | 0 |
| West Valley | 4 | – | 4 | – | 0 | 5 | – | 4 | – | 0 |
| Cabrillo | 3 | – | 5 | – | 0 | 4 | – | 5 | – | 0 |
| Solano | 3 | – | 5 | – | 0 | 3 | – | 5 | – | 1 |
| De Anza | 2 | – | 6 | – | 0 | 3 | – | 6 | – | 0 |
| Menlo | 0 | – | 8 | – | 0 | 0 | – | 9 | – | 0 |
+ – Conference co-champions; ^ – California state junior college small division playoff participant

1968 Coast Conference football standings
| | Conf. | | | | | Overall |
| Team | W | | L | | T | W | | L | | T |
|---|---|---|---|---|---|---|---|---|---|---|
| Hartnell +^ | 4 | – | 1 | – | 0 | 7 | – | 3 | – | 0 |
| Gavilan + | 4 | – | 1 | – | 0 | 8 | – | 1 | – | 0 |
| Cabrillo | 3 | – | 2 | – | 0 | 5 | – | 4 | – | 0 |
| Monterey Peninsula | 3 | – | 2 | – | 0 | 4 | – | 4 | – | 1 |
| Menlo | 1 | – | 4 | – | 0 | 1 | – | 7 | – | 0 |
| Ohlone | 0 | – | 5 | – | 0 | 0 | – | 9 | – | 0 |
+ – Conference co-champions; ^ – California state junior college small division playoff participant

1969 Coast Conference football standings
| | Conf. | | | | | Overall |
| Team | W | | L | | T | W | | L | | T |
|---|---|---|---|---|---|---|---|---|---|---|
| Hartnell $^ | 5 | – | 0 | – | 0 | 6 | – | 4 | – | 0 |
| Monterey Peninsula | 4 | – | 1 | – | 0 | 6 | – | 3 | – | 0 |
| Gavilan | 3 | – | 2 | – | 0 | 6 | – | 3 | – | 0 |
| Cabrillo | 2 | – | 3 | – | 0 | 2 | – | 7 | – | 0 |
| Ohlone | 1 | – | 4 | – | 0 | 2 | – | 7 | – | 0 |
| Menlo | 0 | – | 5 | – | 0 | 2 | – | 6 | – | 0 |
$ – Conference champion; ^ – California state junior college small division playoff participant

1970 Coast Conference football standings
| | Conf. | | | | | Overall |
| Team | W | | L | | T | W | | L | | T |
|---|---|---|---|---|---|---|---|---|---|---|
| Gavilan $^ | 5 | – | 0 | – | 0 | 9 | – | 1 | – | 0 |
| Hartnell | 4 | – | 1 | – | 0 | ? | – | ? | – | ? |
| Monterey Peninsula | 3 | – | 2 | – | 0 | ? | – | ? | – | ? |
| Cabrillo | 2 | – | 3 | – | 0 | ? | – | ? | – | ? |
| Ohlone | 1 | – | 4 | – | 0 | ? | – | ? | – | ? |
| Menlo | 0 | – | 5 | – | 0 | ? | – | ? | – | ? |
$ – Conference champion; ^ – California state junior college small division playoff participant

1971 Coast Conference football standings
| | Conf. | | | | | Overall |
| Team | W | | L | | T | W | | L | | T |
|---|---|---|---|---|---|---|---|---|---|---|
| Hartnell $^ | 5 | – | 0 | – | 0 | 9 | – | 2 | – | 1 |
| Gavilan | 4 | – | 1 | – | 0 | 7 | – | 2 | – | 0 |
| Monterey Peninsula | 2 | – | 3 | – | 0 | 5 | – | 5 | – | 0 |
| Cabrillo | 2 | – | 3 | – | 0 | 4 | – | 6 | – | 0 |
| Ohlone | 2 | – | 3 | – | 0 | 2 | – | 7 | – | 0 |
| Menlo | 0 | – | 5 | – | 0 | 2 | – | 7 | – | 0 |
$ – Conference champion; ^ – California state junior college small division playoff participant

1972 Coast Conference football standings
| | Conf. | | | | | Overall |
| Team | W | | L | | T | W | | L | | T |
|---|---|---|---|---|---|---|---|---|---|---|
| Cabrillo $^ | 4 | – | 1 | – | 0 | 8 | – | 3 | – | 0 |
| Hartnell | 3 | – | 2 | – | 0 | 7 | – | 3 | – | 0 |
| Menlo | 3 | – | 2 | – | 0 | 7 | – | 3 | – | 0 |
| Monterey Peninsula | 3 | – | 2 | – | 0 | 4 | – | 5 | – | 0 |
| Gavilan | 2 | – | 3 | – | 0 | 5 | – | 4 | – | 0 |
| Ohlone | 0 | – | 5 | – | 0 | 1 | – | 9 | – | 0 |
$ – Conference champion; ^ – California state junior college small division playoff participant

1973 Coast Conference football standings
| | Conf. | | | | | Overall |
| Team | W | | L | | T | W | | L | | T |
|---|---|---|---|---|---|---|---|---|---|---|
| Gavilan $^ | 5 | – | 0 | – | 0 | 11 | – | 0 | – | 0 |
| Menlo | 4 | – | 1 | – | 0 | 7 | – | 3 | – | 0 |
| Hartnell | 2 | – | 2 | – | 0 | 6 | – | 3 | – | 0 |
| Monterey Peninsula | 2 | – | 2 | – | 0 | 6 | – | 3 | – | 0 |
| Cabrillo | 1 | – | 4 | – | 0 | 5 | – | 5 | – | 0 |
| Ohlone | 0 | – | 5 | – | 0 | 0 | – | 10 | – | 0 |
$ – Conference champion; ^ – California state junior college small division playoff participant

1974 Coast Conference football standings
| | Conf. | | | | | Overall |
| Team | W | | L | | T | W | | L | | T |
|---|---|---|---|---|---|---|---|---|---|---|
| Cabrillo $^ | 5 | – | 0 | – | 0 | 9 | – | 1 | – | 1 |
| Hartnell | 3 | – | 2 | – | 0 | 5 | – | 3 | – | 1 |
| Gavilan | 3 | – | 2 | – | 0 | 4 | – | 5 | – | 0 |
| Monterey Peninsula | 2 | – | 3 | – | 0 | 5 | – | 5 | – | 0 |
| Menlo | 2 | – | 3 | – | 0 | 3 | – | 5 | – | 1 |
| Ohlone | 0 | – | 5 | – | 0 | 0 | – | 9 | – | 0 |
$ – Conference champion; ^ – California state junior college Division III playoff participant

1975 Coast Conference football standings
| | Conf. | | | | | Overall |
| Team | W | | L | | T | W | | L | | T |
|---|---|---|---|---|---|---|---|---|---|---|
| Hartnell + | 4 | – | 0 | – | 1 | 7 | – | 3 | – | 1 |
| Cabrillo + | 4 | – | 0 | – | 1 | 6 | – | 3 | – | 1 |
| Monterey Peninsula | 3 | – | 2 | – | 0 | 7 | – | 3 | – | 0 |
| Gavilan | 2 | – | 3 | – | 0 | 4 | – | 6 | – | 0 |
| Menlo | 1 | – | 4 | – | 0 | 1 | – | 9 | – | 0 |
| Ohlone | 0 | – | 5 | – | 0 | 1 | – | 8 | – | 0 |
+ – Conference co-champions

1976 Coast Conference football standings
| | Conf. | | | | | Overall |
| Team | W | | L | | T | W | | L | | T |
|---|---|---|---|---|---|---|---|---|---|---|
| Cabrillo $ | 5 | – | 0 | – | 0 | 9 | – | 2 | – | 0 |
| Hartnell | 3 | – | 2 | – | 0 | 4 | – | 5 | – | 1 |
| Monterey Peninsula | 3 | – | 2 | – | 0 | 3 | – | 6 | – | 0 |
| Menlo | 2 | – | 3 | – | 0 | 4 | – | 4 | – | 1 |
| Ohlone | 1 | – | 4 | – | 0 | 1 | – | 8 | – | 0 |
| Gavilan | 1 | – | 4 | – | 0 | 1 | – | 9 | – | 0 |
$ – Conference champion

1977 Coast Conference football standings
| | Conf. | | | | | Overall |
| Team | W | | L | | T | W | | L | | T |
|---|---|---|---|---|---|---|---|---|---|---|
| Ohlone $^ | 4 | – | 1 | – | 0 | 9 | – | 3 | – | 0 |
| Cabrillo | 3 | – | 2 | – | 0 | 8 | – | 2 | – | 0 |
| Menlo | 3 | – | 2 | – | 0 | 8 | – | 2 | – | 0 |
| Hartnell | 3 | – | 2 | – | 0 | 4 | – | 6 | – | 0 |
| Monterey Peninsula | 1 | – | 4 | – | 0 | 5 | – | 5 | – | 0 |
| Gavilan | 1 | – | 4 | – | 0 | 2 | – | 6 | – | 1 |
$ – Conference champion; ^ – California state junior college Division II playoff participant

1978 Coast Conference football standings
| | Conf. | | | | | Overall |
| Team | W | | L | | T | W | | L | | T |
|---|---|---|---|---|---|---|---|---|---|---|
| Monterey Peninsula $^ | 5 | – | 0 | – | 0 | 8 | – | 4 | – | 0 |
| Hartnell | 4 | – | 1 | – | 0 | 9 | – | 1 | – | 0 |
| Cabrillo | 3 | – | 2 | – | 0 | 6 | – | 3 | – | 0 |
| Gavilan | 1 | – | 4 | – | 0 | 5 | – | 5 | – | 0 |
| Menlo | 1 | – | 4 | – | 0 | 3 | – | 7 | – | 0 |
| Ohlone | 1 | – | 4 | – | 0 | 3 | – | 7 | – | 0 |
$ – Conference champion; ^ – California state junior college Division II playoff participant

1979 Coast Conference football standings
| | Conf. | | | | | Overall |
| Team | W | | L | | T | W | | L | | T |
|---|---|---|---|---|---|---|---|---|---|---|
| Cabrillo $^ | 5 | – | 0 | – | 0 | 11 | – | 1 | – | 0 |
| Monterey Peninsula | 4 | – | 1 | – | 0 | 9 | – | 1 | – | 0 |
| Hartnell | 3 | – | 2 | – | 0 | 7 | – | 3 | – | 0 |
| Gavilan | 2 | – | 3 | – | 0 | ? | – | ? | – | ? |
| Menlo | 1 | – | 4 | – | 0 | ? | – | ? | – | ? |
| Ohlone | 0 | – | 5 | – | 0 | ? | – | ? | – | ? |
$ – Conference champion; ^ – California state junior college Division II playoff participant

1980 Coast Conference football standings
| | Conf. | | | | | Overall |
| Team | W | | L | | T | W | | L | | T |
|---|---|---|---|---|---|---|---|---|---|---|
| Hartnell $^ | 4 | – | 0 | – | 1 | 8 | – | 1 | – | 2 |
| Cabrillo | 4 | – | 1 | – | 0 | 8 | – | 2 | – | 0 |
| Monterey Peninsula | 3 | – | 1 | – | 1 | 8 | – | 1 | – | 1 |
| Menlo | 2 | – | 3 | – | 0 | 3 | – | 6 | – | 1 |
| Gavilan | 1 | – | 4 | – | 0 | 2 | – | 7 | – | 0 |
| Ohlone | 0 | – | 5 | – | 0 | 2 | – | 8 | – | 0 |
$ – Conference champion; ^ – California state junior college Division II playoff participant

1981 Coast Conference football standings
| | Conf. | | | | | Overall |
| Team | W | | L | | T | W | | L | | T |
|---|---|---|---|---|---|---|---|---|---|---|
| Hartnell $ | 6 | – | 0 | – | 0 | 10 | – | 1 | – | 0 |
| Cabrillo | 5 | – | 1 | – | 0 | 7 | – | 2 | – | 1 |
| Menlo | 3 | – | 3 | – | 0 | 6 | – | 4 | – | 0 |
| Monterey Peninsula | 3 | – | 3 | – | 0 | 5 | – | 5 | – | 0 |
| Marin | 2 | – | 4 | – | 0 | 5 | – | 5 | – | 0 |
| Ohlone | 1 | – | 5 | – | 0 | 2 | – | 8 | – | 0 |
| Gavilan | 1 | – | 5 | – | 0 | 1 | – | 8 | – | 0 |
$ – Conference champion

1982 Coast Conference football standings
| | Conf. | | | | | Overall |
| Team | W | | L | | T | W | | L | | T |
|---|---|---|---|---|---|---|---|---|---|---|
| Hartnell $ | 5 | – | 0 | – | 0 | 9 | – | 1 | – | 0 |
| Monterey Peninsula | 4 | – | 1 | – | 0 | 7 | – | 2 | – | 0 |
| Menlo | 3 | – | 2 | – | 0 | 6 | – | 3 | – | 0 |
| Cabrillo | 2 | – | 3 | – | 0 | 3 | – | 5 | – | 0 |
| Gavilan | 1 | – | 4 | – | 0 | 2 | – | 8 | – | 0 |
| Marin | 0 | – | 5 | – | 0 | 2 | – | 6 | – | 1 |
$ – Conference champion

1983 Coast Conference football standings
| | Conf. | | | | | Overall |
| Team | W | | L | | T | W | | L | | T |
|---|---|---|---|---|---|---|---|---|---|---|
| Hartnell $ | 6 | – | 0 | – | 0 | 10 | – | 1 | – | 0 |
| Cabrillo | 4 | – | 1 | – | 1 | 7 | – | 2 | – | 1 |
| Menlo | 3 | – | 1 | – | 2 | 5 | – | 3 | – | 2 |
| Gavilan | 2 | – | 3 | – | 1 | 3 | – | 6 | – | 1 |
| Monterey Peninsula | 2 | – | 4 | – | 0 | 2 | – | 8 | – | 0 |
| Los Medanos | 1 | – | 4 | – | 1 | 3 | – | 6 | – | 1 |
| Marin | 0 | – | 5 | – | 1 | 2 | – | 8 | – | 1 |
$ – Conference champion

1984 Coast Conference football standings
| | Conf. | | | | | Overall |
| Team | W | | L | | T | W | | L | | T |
|---|---|---|---|---|---|---|---|---|---|---|
| Hartnell $ | 6 | – | 0 | – | 0 | 8 | – | 3 | – | 0 |
| Menlo | 4 | – | 2 | – | 0 | 8 | – | 2 | – | 0 |
| Monterey Peninsula | 3 | – | 3 | – | 0 | 6 | – | 4 | – | 0 |
| Cabrillo | 3 | – | 3 | – | 0 | 5 | – | 4 | – | 1 |
| Los Medanos | 3 | – | 3 | – | 0 | 4 | – | 6 | – | 0 |
| Gavilan | 2 | – | 4 | – | 0 | 2 | – | 7 | – | 0 |
| Marin | 0 | – | 6 | – | 0 | 0 | – | 10 | – | 0 |
$ – Conference champion

1985 Coast Conference football standings
| | Conf. | | | | | Overall |
| Team | W | | L | | T | W | | L | | T |
|---|---|---|---|---|---|---|---|---|---|---|
| Menlo $ | 5 | – | 0 | – | 1 | 9 | – | 0 | – | 1 |
| Hartnell | 4 | – | 1 | – | 1 | 8 | – | 2 | – | 1 |
| Cabrillo | 4 | – | 2 | – | 0 | 7 | – | 3 | – | 0 |
| Monterey Peninsula | 4 | – | 2 | – | 0 | 6 | – | 4 | – | 0 |
| Gavilan | 2 | – | 4 | – | 0 | 6 | – | 4 | – | 0 |
| Los Medanos | 1 | – | 5 | – | 0 | 4 | – | 6 | – | 0 |
| Marin | 0 | – | 6 | – | 0 | 1 | – | 9 | – | 0 |
$ – Conference champion

1986 Coast Conference football standings
| | Conf. | | | | | Overall |
| Team | W | | L | | T | W | | L | | T |
|---|---|---|---|---|---|---|---|---|---|---|
| De Anza $ | 6 | – | 0 | – | 0 | 10 | – | 1 | – | 0 |
| Gavilan | 5 | – | 1 | – | 0 | 8 | – | 2 | – | 0 |
| Cabrillo | 4 | – | 2 | – | 0 | 7 | – | 3 | – | 0 |
| Hartnell | 3 | – | 3 | – | 0 | 5 | – | 5 | – | 0 |
| Foothill | 2 | – | 4 | – | 0 | 4 | – | 6 | – | 0 |
| Los Medanos | 1 | – | 5 | – | 0 | 2 | – | 8 | – | 0 |
| Monterey Peninsula | 0 | – | 6 | – | 0 | 2 | – | 8 | – | 0 |
$ – Conference champion

1987 Coast Conference football standings
| | Conf. | | | | | Overall |
| Team | W | | L | | T | W | | L | | T |
|---|---|---|---|---|---|---|---|---|---|---|
| De Anza + | 5 | – | 1 | – | 0 | 9 | – | 2 | – | 0 |
| Hartnell + | 5 | – | 1 | – | 0 | 8 | – | 3 | – | 0 |
| Gavilan | 4 | – | 2 | – | 0 | 7 | – | 4 | – | 0 |
| Foothill | 3 | – | 3 | – | 0 | 5 | – | 4 | – | 1 |
| Los Medanos | 3 | – | 3 | – | 0 | 4 | – | 6 | – | 0 |
| Cabrillo | 1 | – | 5 | – | 0 | 4 | – | 6 | – | 0 |
| Monterey Peninsula | 0 | – | 6 | – | 0 | 0 | – | 10 | – | 0 |
+ – Conference co-champions

1988 Coast Conference football standings
| | Conf. | | | | | Overall |
| Team | W | | L | | T | W | | L | | T |
|---|---|---|---|---|---|---|---|---|---|---|
| De Anza $ | 6 | – | 0 | – | 0 | 10 | – | 1 | – | 0 |
| Hartnell | 4 | – | 2 | – | 0 | 9 | – | 2 | – | 0 |
| Gavilan | 4 | – | 2 | – | 0 | 9 | – | 3 | – | 0 |
| Los Medanos | 3 | – | 3 | – | 0 | 6 | – | 3 | – | 1 |
| Foothill | 3 | – | 3 | – | 0 | 4 | – | 5 | – | 0 |
| Monterey Peninsula | 1 | – | 5 | – | 0 | 4 | – | 6 | – | 0 |
| Cabrillo | 0 | – | 6 | – | 0 | 0 | – | 10 | – | 0 |
$ – Conference champion

1989 Coast Conference football standings
| | Conf. | | | | | Overall |
| Team | W | | L | | T | W | | L | | T |
|---|---|---|---|---|---|---|---|---|---|---|
| Hartnell $ | 5 | – | 1 | – | 0 | 8 | – | 2 | – | 0 |
| Gavilan | 4 | – | 2 | – | 0 | 7 | – | 4 | – | 0 |
| De Anza | 4 | – | 2 | – | 0 | 4 | – | 6 | – | 0 |
| Monterey Peninsula | 3 | – | 2 | – | 0 | 6 | – | 3 | – | 0 |
| Cabrillo | 2 | – | 3 | – | 0 | 4 | – | 5 | – | 0 |
| Foothill | 2 | – | 4 | – | 0 | 3 | – | 8 | – | 0 |
| Los Medanos | 1 | – | 5 | – | 0 | 4 | – | 6 | – | 0 |
$ – Conference champion

1990 Coast Conference football standings
| | Div | | | | | Conf. | | | | | Overall |
| Team | W | | L | | T | W | | L | | T | W | | L | | T |
|---|---|---|---|---|---|---|---|---|---|---|---|---|---|---|---|
North Division
| Foothill x | 3 | – | 1 | – | 0 | 6 | – | 1 | – | 0 | 8 | – | 3 | – | 0 |
| Modesto | 3 | – | 1 | – | 0 | 6 | – | 2 | – | 0 | 6 | – | 4 | – | 0 |
| Los Medanos | 2 | – | 2 | – | 0 | 3 | – | 4 | – | 0 | 5 | – | 5 | – | 0 |
| De Anza | 1 | – | 3 | – | 0 | 3 | – | 4 | – | 0 | 4 | – | 6 | – | 0 |
| Kings River | 1 | – | 3 | – | 0 | 1 | – | 7 | – | 0 | 1 | – | 9 | – | 0 |
South Division
| Hartnell x | 5 | – | 0 | – | 0 | 7 | – | 1 | – | 0 | 8 | – | 3 | – | 0 |
| Gavilan | 4 | – | 1 | – | 0 | 5 | – | 3 | – | 0 | 6 | – | 4 | – | 0 |
| Monterey Peninsula | 2 | – | 3 | – | 0 | 4 | – | 4 | – | 0 | 6 | – | 4 | – | 0 |
| Porterville | 2 | – | 3 | – | 0 | 4 | – | 4 | – | 0 | 6 | – | 4 | – | 0 |
| Hancock | 2 | – | 3 | – | 0 | 3 | – | 5 | – | 0 | 4 | – | 6 | – | 0 |
| Cabrillo | 0 | – | 4 | – | 0 | 1 | – | 7 | – | 0 | 1 | – | 9 | – | 0 |
x – Division champion/co-champions

1991 Coast Conference football standings
| | Div | | | | | Conf. | | | | | Overall |
| Team | W | | L | | T | W | | L | | T | W | | L | | T |
|---|---|---|---|---|---|---|---|---|---|---|---|---|---|---|---|
North Division
| Los Medanos x | 3 | – | 1 | – | 0 | 4 | – | 2 | – | 1 | 8 | – | 2 | – | 1 |
| Modesto x | 3 | – | 1 | – | 0 | 4 | – | 2 | – | 1 | 6 | – | 3 | – | 1 |
| De Anza | 2 | – | 2 | – | 0 | 3 | – | 4 | – | 0 | 4 | – | 6 | – | 0 |
| Foothill | 1 | – | 3 | – | 0 | 4 | – | 3 | – | 0 | 4 | – | 5 | – | 0 |
| Kings River | 1 | – | 3 | – | 0 | 2 | – | 5 | – | 0 | 3 | – | 7 | – | 0 |
South Division
| Gavilan x | 5 | – | 0 | – | 0 | 7 | – | 0 | – | 0 | 10 | – | 1 | – | 0 |
| Hancock | 3 | – | 2 | – | 0 | 3 | – | 4 | – | 0 | 4 | – | 5 | – | 0 |
| Cabrillo | 2 | – | 2 | – | 1 | 3 | – | 2 | – | 2 | 5 | – | 3 | – | 2 |
| Hartnell | 2 | – | 2 | – | 1 | 3 | – | 3 | – | 1 | 3 | – | 6 | – | 1 |
| Porterville | 1 | – | 4 | – | 0 | 3 | – | 4 | – | 0 | 4 | – | 6 | – | 0 |
| Monterey Peninsula | 1 | – | 4 | – | 0 | 2 | – | 4 | – | 1 | 4 | – | 5 | – | 1 |
x – Division champion/co-champions

1992 Coast Conference football standings
| | Conf. | | | | | Overall |
| Team | W | | L | | T | W | | L | | T |
|---|---|---|---|---|---|---|---|---|---|---|
North Division
| Gavilan x | 8 | – | 0 | – | 0 | 9 | – | 2 | – | 0 |
| Modesto | 7 | – | 1 | – | 0 | 7 | – | 3 | – | 1 |
| Cabrillo | 4 | – | 4 | – | 0 | 6 | – | 4 | – | 0 |
| De Anza | 4 | – | 4 | – | 0 | 6 | – | 5 | – | 0 |
| Foothill | 3 | – | 5 | – | 0 | 4 | – | 6 | – | 0 |
South Division
| Hartnell x | 7 | – | 1 | – | 0 | 10 | – | 1 | – | 0 |
| Porterville | 2 | – | 6 | – | 0 | 3 | – | 7 | – | 0 |
| Hancock | 2 | – | 6 | – | 0 | 2 | – | 8 | – | 0 |
| Kings River | 2 | – | 6 | – | 0 | 2 | – | 8 | – | 0 |
| Monterey Peninsula | 1 | – | 7 | – | 0 | 1 | – | 9 | – | 0 |
x – Division champion/co-champions

1993 Coast Conference football standings
| | Div | | | | | Conf. | | | | | Overall |
| Team | W | | L | | T | W | | L | | T | W | | L | | T |
|---|---|---|---|---|---|---|---|---|---|---|---|---|---|---|---|
North Division
| Gavilan x | 3 | – | 1 | – | 0 | 7 | – | 1 | – | 0 | 9 | – | 2 | – | 0 |
| Modesto | 2 | – | 2 | – | 0 | 6 | – | 2 | – | 0 | 8 | – | 3 | – | 0 |
| Foothill | 2 | – | 2 | – | 0 | 4 | – | 4 | – | 0 | 5 | – | 5 | – | 0 |
| Cabrillo | 2 | – | 2 | – | 0 | 4 | – | 4 | – | 0 | 5 | – | 6 | – | 0 |
| De Anza | 1 | – | 3 | – | 0 | 5 | – | 3 | – | 0 | 7 | – | 3 | – | 0 |
South Division
| Hartnell x | 3 | – | 0 | – | 0 | 4 | – | 4 | – | 0 | 4 | – | 6 | – | 0 |
| Hancock | 2 | – | 1 | – | 0 | 4 | – | 4 | – | 0 | 5 | – | 5 | – | 0 |
| Kings River | 0 | – | 2 | – | 1 | 1 | – | 6 | – | 1 | 2 | – | 7 | – | 1 |
| Monterey Peninsula | 0 | – | 2 | – | 1 | 0 | – | 7 | – | 1 | 0 | – | 9 | – | 1 |
x – Division champion/co-champions

1994 Coast Conference football standings
| | Div | | | | | Conf. | | | | | Overall |
| Team | W | | L | | T | W | | L | | T | W | | L | | T |
|---|---|---|---|---|---|---|---|---|---|---|---|---|---|---|---|
North Division
| CC of San Francisco x | 5 | – | 0 | – | 0 | 7 | – | 0 | – | 0 | 11 | – | 0 | – | 0 |
| San Mateo | 4 | – | 1 | – | 0 | 6 | – | 1 | – | 0 | 8 | – | 3 | – | 0 |
| Foothill | 2 | – | 3 | – | 0 | 4 | – | 3 | – | 0 | 7 | – | 4 | – | 0 |
| San Jose City | 2 | – | 3 | – | 0 | 4 | – | 3 | – | 0 | 6 | – | 4 | – | 0 |
| Chabot | 1 | – | 4 | – | 0 | 3 | – | 4 | – | 0 | 3 | – | 7 | – | 0 |
| De Anza | 1 | – | 4 | – | 0 | 2 | – | 5 | – | 0 | 2 | – | 7 | – | 1 |
South Division
| West Valley x | 3 | – | 0 | – | 1 | 4 | – | 2 | – | 1 | 5 | – | 4 | – | 2 |
| Gavilan | 3 | – | 1 | – | 0 | 4 | – | 3 | – | 0 | 7 | – | 3 | – | 0 |
| Hartnell | 2 | – | 2 | – | 0 | 3 | – | 4 | – | 0 | 4 | – | 5 | – | 0 |
| Cabrillo | 1 | – | 3 | – | 1 | 1 | – | 6 | – | 1 | 3 | – | 6 | – | 1 |
| Monterey Peninsula | 0 | – | 4 | – | 0 | 0 | – | 7 | – | 0 | 1 | – | 9 | – | 0 |
x – Division champion/co-champions

1995 Coast Conference football standings
| | Div | | | | | Conf. | | | | | Overall |
| Team | W | | L | | T | W | | L | | T | W | | L | | T |
|---|---|---|---|---|---|---|---|---|---|---|---|---|---|---|---|
North Division
| CC of San Francisco x | 4 | – | 1 | – | 0 | 6 | – | 1 | – | 0 | 9 | – | 2 | – | 0 |
| Foothill | 3 | – | 2 | – | 0 | 5 | – | 2 | – | 0 | 8 | – | 3 | – | 0 |
| Chabot | 3 | – | 2 | – | 0 | 5 | – | 2 | – | 0 | 7 | – | 4 | – | 0 |
| San Jose City | 2 | – | 2 | – | 1 | 4 | – | 3 | – | 0 | 7 | – | 2 | – | 2 |
| San Mateo | 1 | – | 3 | – | 1 | 3 | – | 3 | – | 1 | 5 | – | 4 | – | 1 |
| De Anza | 1 | – | 4 | – | 0 | 2 | – | 5 | – | 0 | 2 | – | 8 | – | 0 |
South Division
| Gavilan x | 3 | – | 1 | – | 0 | 4 | – | 3 | – | 0 | 4 | – | 6 | – | 0 |
| Cabrillo | 2 | – | 2 | – | 0 | 3 | – | 4 | – | 0 | 3 | – | 6 | – | 0 |
| West Valley | 2 | – | 2 | – | 0 | 2 | – | 5 | – | 0 | 3 | – | 7 | – | 0 |
| Hartnell | 2 | – | 2 | – | 0 | 2 | – | 5 | – | 0 | 2 | – | 7 | – | 0 |
| Monterey Peninsula | 1 | – | 3 | – | 0 | 1 | – | 6 | – | 0 | 1 | – | 9 | – | 0 |
x – Division champion/co-champions

1996 Coast Conference football standings
| | Div | | | | | Conf. | | | | | Overall |
| Team | W | | L | | T | W | | L | | T | W | | L | | T |
|---|---|---|---|---|---|---|---|---|---|---|---|---|---|---|---|
North Division
| CC of San Francisco x | 5 | – | 0 | – | 0 | 7 | – | 0 | – | 0 | 10 | – | 1 | – | 0 |
| San Jose City | 4 | – | 1 | – | 0 | 5 | – | 2 | – | 0 | 7 | – | 4 | – | 0 |
| Chabot | 3 | – | 2 | – | 0 | 4 | – | 3 | – | 0 | 5 | – | 5 | – | 0 |
| Foothill | 2 | – | 3 | – | 0 | 3 | – | 4 | – | 0 | 4 | – | 6 | – | 0 |
| San Mateo | 1 | – | 4 | – | 0 | 1 | – | 6 | – | 0 | 3 | – | 7 | – | 0 |
| De Anza | 0 | – | 5 | – | 0 | 1 | – | 6 | – | 0 | 1 | – | 9 | – | 0 |
South Division
| Cabrillo x | 3 | – | 1 | – | 0 | 5 | – | 2 | – | 0 | 9 | – | 2 | – | 0 |
| Gavilan x | 3 | – | 1 | – | 0 | 6 | – | 1 | – | 0 | 7 | – | 4 | – | 0 |
| Hartnell | 2 | – | 2 | – | 0 | 4 | – | 3 | – | 0 | 5 | – | 5 | – | 0 |
| West Valley | 2 | – | 2 | – | 0 | 3 | – | 4 | – | 0 | 5 | – | 5 | – | 0 |
| Monterey Peninsula | 0 | – | 4 | – | 0 | 0 | – | 7 | – | 0 | 0 | – | 10 | – | 0 |
x – Division champion/co-champions

1997 Coast Conference football standings
| | Conf. | | | Overall |
| Team | W | | L | W | | L |
|---|---|---|---|---|---|---|
| Cabrillo + | 4 | – | 1 | 10 | – | 1 |
| Monterey Peninsula + | 4 | – | 1 | 5 | – | 5 |
| West Valley | 3 | – | 2 | 7 | – | 4 |
| Hartnell | 3 | – | 2 | 4 | – | 6 |
| De Anza | 0 | – | 5 | 2 | – | 8 |
+ – Conference co-champions

1998 Coast Conference football standings
| | Conf. | | | Overall |
| Team | W | | L | W | | L |
|---|---|---|---|---|---|---|
| Cabrillo + | 3 | – | 1 | 8 | – | 2 |
| Monterey Peninsula + | 3 | – | 1 | 7 | – | 3 |
| West Valley | 2 | – | 2 | 6 | – | 4 |
| Hartnell | 2 | – | 2 | 4 | – | 6 |
| De Anza | 0 | – | 4 | 2 | – | 8 |
+ – Conference co-champions

1999 Coast Conference football standings
| | Conf. | | | Overall |
| Team | W | | L | W | | L |
|---|---|---|---|---|---|---|
| Cabrillo $ | 5 | – | 0 | 9 | – | 1 |
| West Valley | 4 | – | 1 | 6 | – | 4 |
| Hartnell | 3 | – | 2 | 6 | – | 4 |
| De Anza | 1 | – | 4 | 3 | – | 7 |
| Monterey Peninsula | 1 | – | 4 | 2 | – | 8 |
$ – Conference champion

2000 Coast Conference football standings
| | Conf. | | | Overall |
| Team | W | | L | W | | L |
|---|---|---|---|---|---|---|
| West Valley + | 4 | – | 1 | 8 | – | 3 |
| Hartnell + | 4 | – | 1 | 8 | – | 3 |
| Monterey Peninsula | 1 | – | 4 | 4 | – | 6 |
| Gavilan | 1 | – | 4 | 3 | – | 7 |
| De Anza | 1 | – | 4 | 1 | – | 9 |
+ – Conference co-champions

2001 Coast Conference football standings
| | Conf. | | | Overall |
| Team | W | | L | W | | L |
|---|---|---|---|---|---|---|
| San Mateo $ | 5 | – | 0 | 8 | – | 2 |
| Hartnell | 4 | – | 1 | 4 | – | 6 |
| West Valley | 3 | – | 2 | 6 | – | 4 |
| Monterey Peninsula | 1 | – | 4 | 4 | – | 6 |
| De Anza | 1 | – | 4 | 2 | – | 8 |
| Gavilan | 1 | – | 4 | 1 | – | 9 |
$ – Conference champion

2002 Coast Conference football standings
| | Conf. | | | Overall |
| Team | W | | L | W | | L |
|---|---|---|---|---|---|---|
| Hartnell + | 3 | – | 1 | 5 | – | 6 |
| Cabrillo + | 3 | – | 1 | 5 | – | 5 |
| Gavilan | 2 | – | 2 | 4 | – | 6 |
| De Anza | 1 | – | 3 | 3 | – | 7 |
| Monterey Peninsula | 1 | – | 3 | 1 | – | 9 |
+ – Conference co-champions

2003 Coast Conference football standings
| | Conf. | | | Overall |
| Team | W | | L | W | | L |
|---|---|---|---|---|---|---|
| Gavilan + | 3 | – | 1 | 5 | – | 6 |
| De Anza + | 3 | – | 1 | 4 | – | 6 |
| Hartnell | 2 | – | 2 | 4 | – | 6 |
| Cabrillo | 2 | – | 2 | 3 | – | 7 |
| Monterey Peninsula | 0 | – | 4 | 1 | – | 9 |
+ – Conference co-champions

2004 Coast Conference football standings
| | Conf. | | | Overall |
| Team | W | | L | W | | L |
|---|---|---|---|---|---|---|
| No. 15 Monterey Peninsula $ | 5 | – | 0 | 9 | – | 1 |
| Gavilan | 3 | – | 2 | 6 | – | 4 |
| Cabrillo | 3 | – | 2 | 5 | – | 5 |
| Hartnell | 3 | – | 2 | 5 | – | 5 |
| San Jose City | 1 | – | 4 | 1 | – | 9 |
| De Anza | 0 | – | 5 | 2 | – | 8 |
$ – Conference champion; Rankings from Coaches' Poll

2005 Coast Conference football standings
| | Conf. | | | Overall |
| Team | W | | L | W | | L |
|---|---|---|---|---|---|---|
| Hartnell $ | 5 | – | 0 | 6 | – | 4 |
| Monterey Peninsula | 3 | – | 2 | 7 | – | 3 |
| Cabrillo | 3 | – | 2 | 5 | – | 5 |
| Gavilan | 2 | – | 3 | 3 | – | 7 |
| De Anza | 1 | – | 4 | 2 | – | 8 |
| San Jose City | 1 | – | 4 | 1 | – | 9 |
$ – Conference champion

2006 Coast Conference football standings
| | Conf. | | | Overall |
| Team | W | | L | W | | L |
|---|---|---|---|---|---|---|
| Monterey Peninsula + | 3 | – | 1 | 9 | – | 1 |
| Cabrillo + | 3 | – | 1 | 6 | – | 4 |
| Gavilan + | 3 | – | 1 | 4 | – | 6 |
| De Anza | 1 | – | 3 | 5 | – | 5 |
| San Jose City | 0 | – | 4 | 2 | – | 8 |
+ – Conference co-champions

2007 Coast Conference football standings
| | Conf. | | | Overall |
| Team | W | | L | W | | L |
|---|---|---|---|---|---|---|
| Cabrillo $ | 4 | – | 0 | 6 | – | 4 |
| Monterey Peninsula | 3 | – | 1 | 8 | – | 2 |
| San Jose City | 2 | – | 2 | 4 | – | 6 |
| De Anza | 1 | – | 3 | 1 | – | 8 |
| Gavilan | 0 | – | 4 | 2 | – | 8 |
$ – Conference champion

2008 Coast Conference football standings
| | Conf. | | | Overall |
| Team | W | | L | W | | L |
|---|---|---|---|---|---|---|
| Monterey Peninsula $ | 5 | – | 0 | 10 | – | 0 |
| De Anza | 4 | – | 1 | 7 | – | 3 |
| West Valley | 3 | – | 2 | 5 | – | 5 |
| San Jose City | 2 | – | 3 | 3 | – | 7 |
| Gavilan | 1 | – | 4 | 3 | – | 7 |
| Hartnell | 0 | – | 5 | 2 | – | 8 |
$ – Conference champion

2009 Coast Conference football standings
| | Conf. | | | Overall |
| Team | W | | L | W | | L |
|---|---|---|---|---|---|---|
| De Anza $ | 5 | – | 0 | 7 | – | 3 |
| Hartnell | 4 | – | 1 | 5 | – | 5 |
| San Jose City | 3 | – | 2 | 7 | – | 3 |
| Gavilan | 2 | – | 3 | 3 | – | 7 |
| Monterey Peninsula | 1 | – | 4 | 3 | – | 7 |
| West Valley | 0 | – | 5 | 0 | – | 10 |
$ – Conference champion

2010 Coast Conference football standings
| | Conf. | | | Overall |
| Team | W | | L | W | | L |
|---|---|---|---|---|---|---|
| San Jose City $ | 5 | – | 0 | 6 | – | 5 |
| Monterey Peninsula | 4 | – | 1 | 5 | – | 5 |
| Cabrillo | 2 | – | 3 | 3 | – | 7 |
| Hartnell | 2 | – | 3 | 2 | – | 8 |
| Gavilan | 1 | – | 4 | 1 | – | 9 |
| West Valley | 1 | – | 4 | 1 | – | 9 |
$ – Conference champion

2011 Coast Conference football standings
| | Conf. | | | Overall |
| Team | W | | L | W | | L |
|---|---|---|---|---|---|---|
| Monterey Peninsula + | 4 | – | 1 | 7 | – | 3 |
| Hartnell + | 4 | – | 1 | 7 | – | 3 |
| Cabrillo | 3 | – | 2 | 4 | – | 6 |
| San Jose City | 2 | – | 3 | 2 | – | 8 |
| West Valley | 2 | – | 3 | 2 | – | 8 |
| Gavilan | 0 | – | 5 | 0 | – | 10 |
+ – Conference co-champions

2012 Coast Conference football standings
| | Conf. | | | Overall |
| Team | W | | L | W | | L |
|---|---|---|---|---|---|---|
| Hartnell + | 4 | – | 1 | 6 | – | 4 |
| Cabrillo + | 4 | – | 1 | 5 | – | 5 |
| Monterey Peninsula + | 4 | – | 1 | 5 | – | 6 |
| Gavilan | 2 | – | 3 | 3 | – | 7 |
| San Jose City | 1 | – | 4 | 1 | – | 9 |
| West Valley | 0 | – | 5 | 1 | – | 9 |
+ – Conference co-champions

2013 Coast Conference football standings
| | Conf. | | | Overall |
| Team | W | | L | W | | L |
|---|---|---|---|---|---|---|
| Hartnell $ | 5 | – | 0 | 9 | – | 2 |
| Monterey Peninsula | 3 | – | 2 | 4 | – | 6 |
| San Jose City | 3 | – | 2 | 4 | – | 6 |
| Gavilan | 2 | – | 3 | 4 | – | 6 |
| Cabrillo | 2 | – | 3 | 3 | – | 7 |
| West Valley | 0 | – | 5 | 1 | – | 9 |
$ – Conference champion
