= 1994 CCSF Rams football team =

American college football season

1994 City College of San Francisco Rams football

Junior college national champion (USA Today) Coast Conference North Division champion

Community College Bowl, W 28–23 vs. Laney
- Conference: Coast Conference
- North Division
- Record: 11–0 (7–0 Coast)
- Head coach: George Rush (17th season)
- Home stadium: Ram Stadium

1994 Coast Conference football standings
	Div					Conf.					Overall
Team	W		L		T	W		L		T	W		L		T
North Division
CC of San Francisco x	5	–	0	–	0	7	–	0	–	0	11	–	0	–	0
San Mateo	4	–	1	–	0	6	–	1	–	0	8	–	3	–	0
Foothill	2	–	3	–	0	4	–	3	–	0	7	–	4	–	0
San Jose City	2	–	3	–	0	4	–	3	–	0	6	–	4	–	0
Chabot	1	–	4	–	0	3	–	4	–	0	3	–	7	–	0
De Anza	1	–	4	–	0	2	–	5	–	0	2	–	7	–	1
South Division
West Valley x	3	–	0	–	1	4	–	2	–	1	5	–	4	–	2
Gavilan	3	–	1	–	0	4	–	3	–	0	7	–	3	–	0
Hartnell	2	–	2	–	0	3	–	4	–	0	4	–	5	–	0
Cabrillo	1	–	3	–	1	1	–	6	–	1	3	–	6	–	1
Monterey Peninsula	0	–	4	–	0	0	–	7	–	0	1	–	9	–	0
x – Division champion/co-champions

The 1994 CCSF Rams football team was an American football team that represented City College of San Francisco (CCSF) during the 1994 junior college football season. In their 17th year under head coach George Rush, the Rams compiled a perfect 11–0 record (7–0 in conference games), outscored opponents by a total of 469 to 178, and were ranked No. 1 nationally in the USA Today/National Community College Football Coaches Alliance Poll.

The team claimed a 34-game regular-season winning streak, but had lost postseason games in 1992 and 1993. The 1994 team concluded a perfect season with a victory over Laney College in the Community College Bowl.

CCSF was ranked No. 2 in the JC Grid-Wire poll and proposed a postseason game against No. 1 Trinity Valley of Texas. Trinity agreed, but National Junior College Athletic Association (NJCAA) executive director George Killian rejected the proposal. Because the California community colleges were not affiliated with the NJCAA, the association had not sanctioned a postseason match involving a California school since 1977.

Key players for CCSF in 1994 included:

- Quarterback Jason Piccolotti, who threw 31 touchdown passes and also rushed for five touchdowns during the regular season.
- Running back Major Norton who tallied 244 rushing yards on 32 carries against West Valley.
- Linebacker Vernon Crawford later played four years in the NFL.

== Schedule ==
Date	Opponent	Site	Result	Source
September 17	Cabrillo	Ram Stadium; San Francisco, CA	W 35–21	
September 24	at Monterey Peninsula	Monterey, CA	W 61–13	
October 1	at Merced*	Merced, CA	W 52–21	
October 8	Sequoias*	Ram Stadium; San Francisco, CA	W 35–28	
October 15	West Valley	Ram Stadium; San Francisco, CA	W 37–14	
October 22	at Chabot	Hayward, CA	W 44–9	
October 29	San Jose City	Ram Stadium; San Francisco, CA	W 38–13	
November 5	Foothill		W 58–20	
November 12	De Anza		W 33–0	
November 19	San Mateo		W 48–16	
December 3	Laney*	Ram Stadium; San Francisco, CA (Community College Bowl)	W 28–23	
*Non-conference game
