= George Rush (American football) =

American football coach and athletics administrator

Biographical details
- Born: c. 1947

Playing career
- 1966–1967: CC of San Francisco
- Position: Quarterback

Coaching career (HC unless noted)
- 1972–1976: CC of San Francisco (assistant)
- 1977–2014: CC of San Francisco

Administrative career (AD unless noted)
- 1989–2009: CC of San Francisco

Head coaching record
- Overall: 326–93–4

Accomplishments and honors

Championships
- 7 junior college national (1994, 1999, 2000, 2001, 2003, 2007, 2011)

George M. Rush (born c. 1947) is an American former junior college football coach and athletics administrator. He served as the head football coach at City College of San Francisco (CCSF) from 1977 to 2014, compiling a record of 326–93–4. He led his teams at CCSF to seven junior college national championships. Rush was also the school's athletic director from 1989 to 2009.

A native of San Francisco, Rush starred in football at St. Ignatius High School. He then played for two years at CCSF before transferring to San Fernando Valley State College—now known as California State University, Northridge—from which he earned a Bachelor of Arts. Rush was a graduate assistant at Wake Forest University and an assistant coach at the College of the Canyons in Santa Clarita, California before returning to CCSF as an assistant in 1972. He succeeded Dutch Elston as head football coach at CCSF in 1977.

== Head coaching record ==
Year	Team	Overall	Conference	Standing	Bowl/playoffs
City College of San Francisco Rams (Golden Gate Conference) (1977–1993)
1977	City College of San Francisco	6–4	4–4	5th	
1978	City College of San Francisco	7–2–1	5–2–1	3rd	
1979	City College of San Francisco	5–5	3–5	T–6th	
1980	City College of San Francisco	4–6	3–5	6th	
1981	City College of San Francisco	7–2–1	5–2	3rd	
1982	City College of San Francisco	5–5	4–3	T–3rd	
1983	City College of San Francisco	8–3	6–1	T–1st	L Bay Bowl
1984	City College of San Francisco	5–5	4–4	T–4th	
1985	City College of San Francisco	1–9	1–7	8th	
1986	City College of San Francisco	8–2	5–1	2nd	
1987	City College of San Francisco	5–5	2–4	T–5th	
1988	City College of San Francisco	5–5–1	2–3–1	5th	
1989	City College of San Francisco	2–8	1–5	T–5th	
1990	City College of San Francisco	9–2	7–0	1st	W San Francisco Community College Bowl
1991	City College of San Francisco	9–2			W San Francisco Community College Bowl
1992	City College of San Francisco	10–1	7–0	1st	W Orange Country Bowl
1993	City College of San Francisco	10–1			L San Francisco Community College Bowl
City College of San Francisco Rams (Coast Conference) (1994–1996)
1994	City College of San Francisco	11–0	7–0 / 5–0	1st (North)	W San Francisco Community College Bowl
1995	City College of San Francisco	9–2	6–1 / 4–1	1st (North)	W San Francisco Community College Bowl
1996	City College of San Francisco	10–1	7–0 / 5–0	1st (North)	W San Francisco Community College Bowl
City College of San Francisco Rams (Golden Gate Conference) (1997–2001)
1997	City College of San Francisco	11–1	5–0	1st	W Hawaiian Punch Bowl
1998	City College of San Francisco	11–0	5–0	1st	W Hawaiian Punch Bowl
1999	City College of San Francisco	11–0	5–0	1st	W Holiday Bowl
2000	City College of San Francisco	12–0	5–0	1st	W Hawaiian Punch Bowl, W CCCAA Championship
2001	City College of San Francisco	12–0	4–0	1st	W Hawaiian Punch Bowl, W CCCAA Championship
City College of San Francisco Rams (NorCal Conference) (2002–2013)
2002	City College of San Francisco	9–2	3–2	3rd	W Hawaiian Punch Bowl
2003	City College of San Francisco	12–0	5–0	1st	W CCCAA Championship
2004	City College of San Francisco	10–0	5–0	1st	W Hawaiian Punch Bowl, L CCCAA Championship
2005	City College of San Francisco	10–2	4–1	1st	W Hawaiian Punch Bowl, L CCCAA Championship
2006	City College of San Francisco	10–1	4–1	T–1st	W Hawaiian Punch, L CCCAA Championship
2007	City College of San Francisco	11–1			W Hawaiian Punch, W CCCAA Championship
2008	City College of San Francisco	7–4	4–1	2nd	L Hawaiian Punch Bowl
2009	City College of San Francisco	10–1	4–1	T–1st	W Hawaiian Punch Bowl
2010	City College of San Francisco	11–1	5–0	1st	L CCCAA Championship
2011	City College of San Francisco	12–0	5–0	1st	W CCCAA Championship
2012	City College of San Francisco	10–2	4–1	T–1st	L CCCAA Championship
2013	City College of San Francisco	8–3	3–2	3rd	
City College of San Francisco Rams (National Bay 6 Conference) (2014)
2014	City College of San Francisco	11–2	5–0	1st	L CCCAA Championship
City College of San Francisco:		326–93–4			
Total:		326–93–4			
National championship Conference title Conference division title or championship game berth
