= Gary Barlow (American football) =

American football coach (born c. 1967)

Current position
- Title: Head coach
- Team: San Joaquin Delta
- Conference: NB6L
- Record: 114–137

Biographical details
- Born: c. 1967 (age 58–59); Tracy, California, U.S.
- Education: San Joaquin Delta College; University of the Pacific; Azusa Pacific University

Playing career
- 1985–1986: Wyoming
- 1987: San Joaquin Delta
- 1988–1989: Pacific (CA)
- 1990: New York Giants*
- 1990: Barcelona Dragons
- Positions: Tackle, guard

Coaching career (HC unless noted)
- 1990–1991: San Joaquin Delta (OL)
- 1992–1996: Los Angeles Valley (OC/OL)
- 1997–1998: Los Angeles Valley
- 1999–2000: San Joaquin Delta (OC)
- 2001–present: San Joaquin Delta

Head coaching record
- Overall: 124–147
- Bowls: 6–5

Accomplishments and honors

Championships
- 1 MEC (2002); 2 Valley Conference (2004, 2010)

Awards
- All-Camino Norte (1987)

Gary Barlow (born c. 1967) is an American junior college football coach. He is the head football coach for San Joaquin Delta College, a position he has held since 2001. He was the head football coach for Los Angeles Valley College from 1997 to 1998. He played college football for Wyoming, San Joaquin Delta—where he earned All-Camino Norte Conference honors—and Pacific (CA) as a tackle. He played professionally for the New York Giants of the National Football League (NFL) and the Barcelona Dragons of NFL Europe as a guard.

== Head coaching record ==
Year	Team	Overall	Conference	Standing	Bowl/playoffs	CCCAA^{#}
Los Angeles Valley Monarchs (Western State Conference) (1997–1998)
1997	Los Angeles Valley	6–4	2–3	4th (Southern)		
1998	Los Angeles Valley	4–6	3–4	5th (Southern)		
Los Angeles Valley:		10–10	5–7			
San Joaquin Delta Mustangs (Mid-Empire Conference) (2001–2003)
2001	San Joaquin Delta	8–3	4–1	2nd	W Capital Shrine Bowl	
2002	San Joaquin Delta	9–2	5–0	1st	L Bank Holiday Bowl	11
2003	San Joaquin Delta	9–2	4–1	2nd	L Silicon Valley Bowl	12
San Joaquin Delta Mustangs (Valley Conference) (2004–2013)
2004	San Joaquin Delta	9–2	4–1	T–1st	W Bank Holiday Bowl	8
2005	San Joaquin Delta	2–8	1–4	5th		
2006	San Joaquin Delta	4–6	2–3	T–4th		
2007	San Joaquin Delta	8–3	3–2		L Stockman's Bank Bowl	6 (Northern)
2008	San Joaquin Delta	8–3	3–2	3rd	W Hawaiian Punch Bowl	
2009	San Joaquin Delta	5–5	2–3	T–4th		
2010	San Joaquin Delta	7–4	4–1	T–1st	L ASBG Bowl	6 (Northern)
2011	San Joaquin Delta	7–4	3–2	T–2nd	W Togo's Delta Bowl	9 (Northern)
2012	San Joaquin Delta	8–3	3–2	T–3rd	W Silicon Valley Bowl	
2013	San Joaquin Delta	2–8	1–4	T–5th		
San Joaquin Delta Mustangs (National Valley Conference / League) (2014–2020)
2014	San Joaquin Delta	1–9	1–4	5th		
2015	San Joaquin Delta	7–4	4–1	2nd	W Gridiron Classic Bowl	
2016	San Joaquin Delta	2–8	1–4	5th		
2017	San Joaquin Delta	4–6	2–3	4th		
2018	San Joaquin Delta	0–10	0–5	6th		
2019	San Joaquin Delta	4–6	2–3	4th		
2020–21	No team—COVID-19					
San Joaquin Delta Mustangs (National Bay 6 League) (2021–2024)
2021	San Joaquin Delta	1–9	1–4	5th		
2022	San Joaquin Delta	1–9	0–5	6th		
2023	San Joaquin Delta	3–7	2–3	4th		
2024	San Joaquin Delta	0–10	0–5	6th		
San Joaquin Delta Mustangs (American Pacific 7 League) (2025–present)
2025	San Joaquin Delta	5–6	2–3	4th	L Northern California Bowl	
San Joaquin Delta:		114–137	54–65			
Total:		124–147				
National championship Conference title Conference division title or championship game berth
