= Vivo V50 =

2025 smartphone model

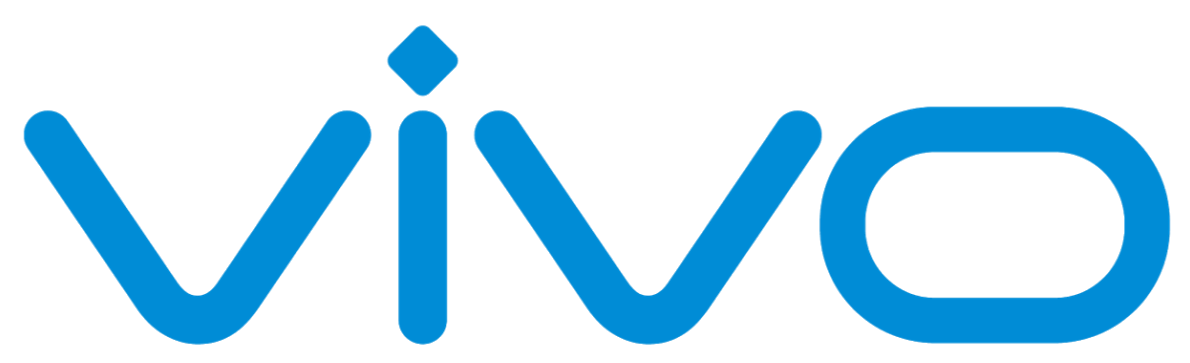
- Manufacturer: Vivo
- Type: Smartphone
- Series: Vivo V-series
- First released: February 17, 2025 (India)
- Availability by region: February 25, 2025
- Predecessor: Vivo V40
- Successor: Vivo V60
- Form factor: Slate
- Dimensions: 163.29 × 76.72 × 7.39 mm (Titanium Grey); 163.29 × 76.72 × 7.67 mm (Rose Red, Starry Night)
- Weight: 189 g (7 oz) (Titanium Grey); 199 g (Rose Red, Starry Night)
- Operating system: Funtouch OS 15, based on Android 15
- System-on-chip: Qualcomm Snapdragon 7 Gen 3
- CPU: Octa-core (1×2.63 GHz Cortex-A715, 3×2.4 GHz Cortex-A715, 4×1.8 GHz Cortex-A510)
- GPU: Adreno 720
- Memory: 8 GB or 12 GB LPDDR4X RAM (extendable by 8 GB or 12 GB)
- Storage: 128 GB, 256 GB, or 512 GB UFS 2.2
- Removable storage: None
- Battery: 6000 mAh (typical), 5870 mAh (rated); 90W FlashCharge wired
- Rear camera: Dual-Camera Setup; Primary: OmniVision OV50E; 50 MP, f/1.88, 23mm, FoV 92˚, 1/1.55", 1.0μm, PDAF, OIS; Ultrawide: Samsung ISOCELL S5KJN1; 50 MP, f/2.0, 15mm, FoV 119.4˚, 1/2.76", 0.64μm, AF; Features: Color spectrum sensor, Zeiss optics, Ring-LED flash, panorama, HDR; Video: 4K@30fps, 1080p@30fps, gyro-EIS, OIS
- Front camera: Samsung ISOCELL S5KJN1; 50 MP, f/2.0, 21mm, FoV 90˚, 1/2.76", 0.64μm, AF; Features: Zeiss optics, HDR; Video: 4K@30fps, 1080p@30fps
- Display: 6.77-inch (17.19 cm) AMOLED; 1080 × 2392 pixels, 120 Hz, 4500 nits (peak), HDR10+
- Connectivity: 5G, 4G LTE, Wi-Fi, Bluetooth 5.4, GPS, USB 3.2 Type-C
- Model: V2345
- Other: IP68/IP69 dust and water resistance In-display fingerprint sensor
- Website: Official website

The Vivo V50, also known as Jovi V50 in Brazil, is a mid-range smartphone developed by Vivo, a Chinese technology company. Released on February 25, 2025, in India, the Vivo V50 is part of the V-series lineup, succeeding the Vivo V40. It is marketed as a photography-focused device with a sleek design, featuring Zeiss-co-engineered cameras, a large battery, and enhanced durability. Unlike previous V-series launches, Vivo did not release a "Pro" variant alongside the standard V50 model in 2025.

== Specifications ==
=== Design ===
The Vivo V50 features a quad-curved AMOLED display with a 41-degree curvature and ultra-slim bezels measuring 1.86 mm. It is available in three color options: Rose Red, Titanium Grey, and Starry Night, with the latter featuring a reflective 3D-star technology pattern exclusive to India. The device measures 163.29 × 76.72 × 7.39 mm (Titanium Grey) or 7.67 mm (Rose Red and Starry Night) and weighs 189 g or 199 g depending on the variant. It incorporates Diamond Shield Glass, developed with Schott, offering a claimed 50% improvement in drop resistance compared to its predecessor.

=== Display ===
The Vivo V50 sports a 6.77-inch (17.19 cm) Full HD+ AMOLED display with a resolution of 1080 × 2392 pixels. It supports a 120 Hz refresh rate and achieves a peak brightness of 4500 nits, with HDR10+ compatibility and a wide P3 color gamut.

=== Hardware ===
Powered by the Qualcomm Snapdragon 7 Gen 3 chipset, the Vivo V50 is equipped with an octa-core processor (2.63 GHz single-core Cortex-A715, 2.4 GHz tri-core Cortex-A715, and 1.8 GHz quad-core Cortex-A510). It comes with LPDDR4X RAM options of 8 GB or 12 GB (extendable by an additional 8 GB or 12 GB via software) and UFS 2.2 storage variants of 128 GB, 256 GB, or 512 GB, with no expandable storage slot. The device includes a heat dissipation system with 3806 mm^{2} of high-performance graphite and 11,214 mm^{2} of superconducting copper foil for thermal management.

=== Camera ===
The Vivo V50 features a dual rear camera system co-engineered with Zeiss:

- A 50-megapixel primary sensor with optical image stabilization (OIS) and an f/1.88 aperture.
- A 50-megapixel ultra-wide-angle lens with a 119.4° field of view (109.2° after distortion correction) and an f/2.0 aperture.

The rear cameras support 4K video recording and multifocal portrait modes at 23 mm, 35 mm, and 50 mm focal lengths, along with seven Zeiss-style bokeh effects. The phone also includes an Aura Light flash with AI 3D Studio Lighting 2.0 for enhanced portrait photography. The front camera is a 50-megapixel wide-angle sensor with a 90° field of view and autofocus, optimized for group selfies.

=== Battery and charging ===
The Vivo V50 houses a 6000 mAh battery (typical capacity; rated at 5870 mAh), making it one of the slimmest smartphones in its category. It supports 90 W FlashCharge wired charging, an upgrade from the 80 W charging of the Vivo V40.

=== Software ===
The smartphone runs on Funtouch OS 15, based on Android 15, out of the box. Vivo promises three years of major OS updates and four years of security patches. It includes AI features such as Google Gemini integration, Circle to Search, Live Call Translation, and AI Transcript Assist.

=== Connectivity ===
The Vivo V50 supports dual 5G, 4G LTE, Wi-Fi, Bluetooth 5.4, GPS, OTG, and a USB 3.2 Type-C port. It features a 360° Omnidirectional Antenna 2.0 with AI-powered network selection and Signal Bridge Technology for improved connectivity in weak signal areas.

=== Durability ===
The device is rated IP68 and IP69 for dust and water resistance, capable of withstanding submersion in 1.5 meters of fresh water for 30 minutes and high-pressure water jets at 80 °C.

== Release and pricing ==
The Vivo V50 was launched in India on February 17, 2025, with sales beginning on February 25 via Amazon, Flipkart, and Vivo's official website. It is priced at ₹34,999 for the 8 GB + 128 GB variant, ₹36,999 for the 8 GB + 256 GB variant, and ₹40,999 for the 12 GB + 512 GB variant. Launch offers included a ₹2000 discount on select bank cards and up to six months of no-cost EMI.

== Reception ==
The Vivo V50 has been praised for its slim design, vibrant display, and long-lasting battery, positioning it as a strong contender in the mid-range smartphone market. Critics have noted its camera performance, particularly in portrait photography, as a highlight due to the Zeiss collaboration. However, some reviews pointed out the use of UFS 2.2 storage instead of the faster UFS 3.1 or 4.0 as a limitation compared to competitors like the OnePlus 13R and Motorola Edge 50 Pro.

== Variants ==
Unlike previous V-series releases, Vivo did not announce a V50 Pro model at launch. However, a Vivo V50e variant was teased in India, featuring a MediaTek Dimensity 7300 chipset, a 6.7-inch AMOLED display, and a 5600 mAh battery, with a launch scheduled for April 10, 2025. It also featured 256 GB storage, 8 GB RAM, and Diamond Shield Glass.

== See also ==
- Vivo X200
