= International Marketplace =

The phrase International Marketplace is used to describe many ventures including:

- Year round
  - International Marketplace (San Pablo, California)
  - International Market Place (in Waikiki)
  - International Marketplace, Las Vegas, a grocery store in Las Vegas, Nevada
- Seasonal events
  - International Marketplace, Toronto, Canada
