= Roy Lee (disambiguation) =

Roy Lee is an American film and television producer.

Roy Lee may also refer to:

- Roy Lee (entrepreneur) (born 2003), American entrepreneur
- Roy Lee (baseball) (1917–1985), American baseball player
- Roy Noble Lee (1915–2015), American judge
- Roy S. Lee (1887–1972), Canadian politician
