= Contra Costa Community College District =

Community college district in Contra Costa county, California, United States

Coordinates: 38°1′8″N 122°8′7″W

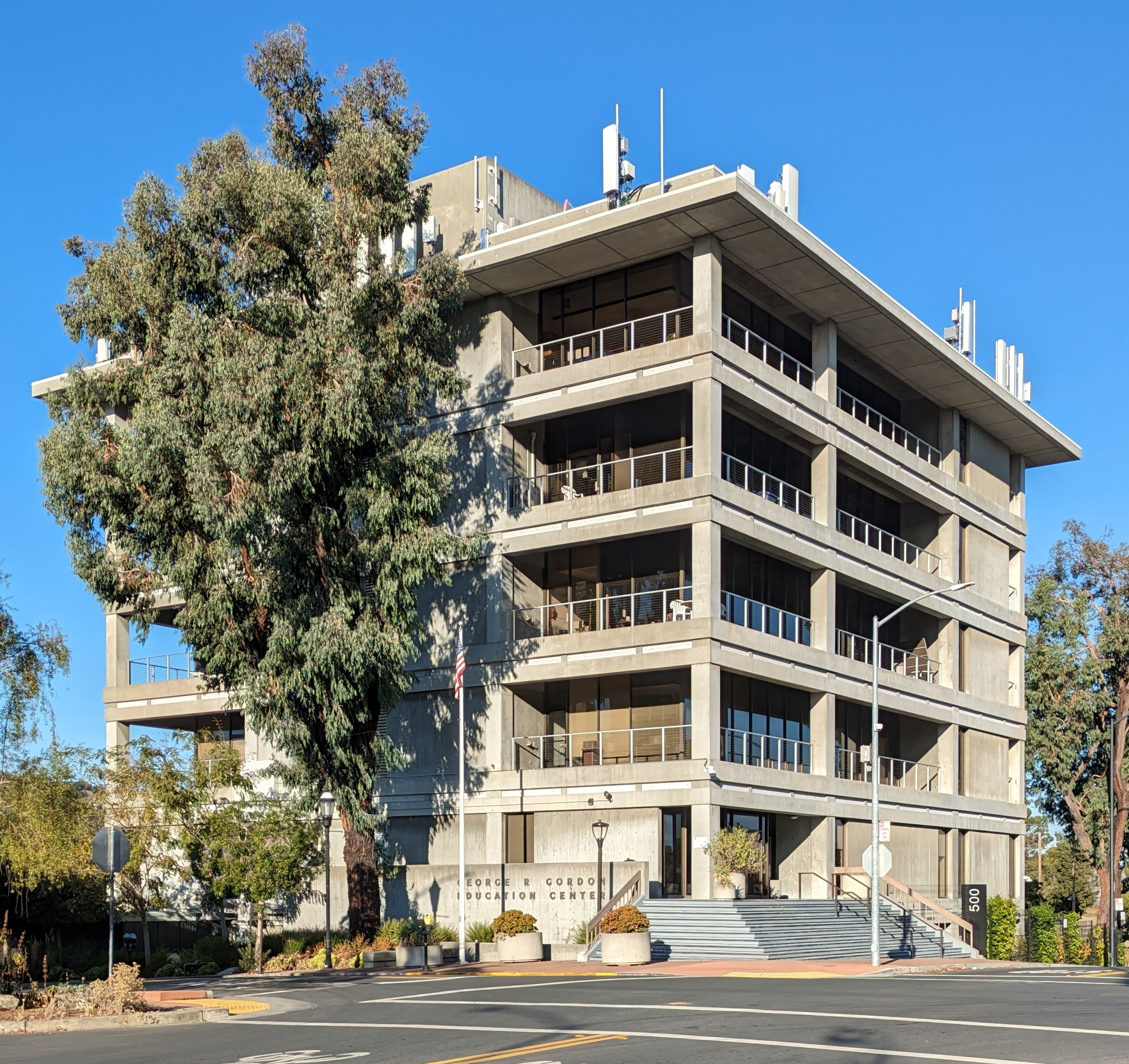
George R. Gordon Education Center

The Contra Costa Community College District is a community college district that encompasses three community colleges in Contra Costa County, California - Contra Costa College, Diablo Valley College and Los Medanos College. The headquarters is in the George R. Gordon Education Center in Martinez, California.

== Colleges ==
- Contra Costa College - San Pablo, California
- Diablo Valley College - Pleasant Hill, California
  - San Ramon Valley Campus - San Ramon, California
- Los Medanos College - Pittsburg, California
  - Brentwood Center - Brentwood, California
