= Vivo V40 =

2024 smartphone model

- Brand: Vivo
- Manufacturer: Vivo
- Type: Smartphone
- Series: Vivo V series
- First released: 2024
- Availability by region: 2024
- Predecessor: Vivo V30
- Successor: Vivo V50
- Related: Vivo V40 Pro
- Compatible networks: 2G / 3G / 4G LTE / 5G
- Form factor: Slate
- Operating system: Android 14 (Funtouch OS)
- System-on-chip: Qualcomm Snapdragon 7 Gen 3
- GPU: Adreno 720
- Memory: 8 GB / 12 GB RAM
- Storage: 128 GB / 256 GB / 512 GB
- Removable storage: No
- Battery: 5,500 mAh
- Charging: 80 W fast charging
- Rear camera: Dual: 50 MP (wide) + 50 MP (secondary)
- Front camera: 50 MP
- Display: 6.78 in AMOLED, 2800 × 1260, up to 120 Hz
- Connectivity: USB-C; Wi-Fi; Bluetooth; GPS
- Data inputs: In-display fingerprint sensor

Vivo V40 is an Android smartphone developed by the Chinese technology company Vivo. It was announced in 2024 as part of the company’s V-series lineup, which focuses on mid-range devices featuring advanced camera systems and hardware. The phone supports 5G connectivity and runs on Android with Vivo’s custom user interface.

== Specifications ==
=== Design and display ===
The Vivo V40 features a glass front and back with a slim profile and curved edges. It is equipped with a 6.78-inch AMOLED display offering a resolution of 2800 × 1260 pixels and a refresh rate of up to 120 Hz. The device includes an in-display fingerprint sensor for biometric authentication.

=== Hardware ===
The smartphone is powered by the Qualcomm Snapdragon 7 Gen 3 processor paired with an Adreno GPU. It is available in multiple configurations with up to 12 GB of RAM and up to 512 GB of internal storage.

The device houses a 5,500 mAh battery and supports fast charging via USB-C.

=== Camera ===
The Vivo V40 features a dual rear camera system co-engineered with ZEISS, it has a 50 MP wide-angle primary sensor with optical image stabilization (OIS) and a 50 MP ultra-wide lens.

The front camera uses a 50 MP sensor with autofocus for high-resolution selfies and video calls. Both front and rear cameras support 4K video recording and electronic image stabilization.

=== Software ===
The Vivo V40 ships with Android 14 with Vivo’s Funtouch OS 14 user interface. Funtouch OS 14 includes system customization options, privacy controls, and features intended to support multitasking and device security.
