= Robert Scott (author) =

American non-fiction author (1941–2015)

- Born: 1941 or 1942
- Died: January 9, 2015 (aged 73); Northern California, U.S.
- Occupation: Author
- Years active: 2000–2015
- Notable work: Rope Burns; Shattered Innocence
- Style: Narrative
- Website: robertscotttruecrime.com

Robert Scott (c. 1941 – January 9, 2015) was a New York Times best-selling American non-fiction author who wrote 20 true crime books.

== Education ==
Scott attended Diablo Valley College.

== Career ==
In the late 1990s, after reading newspaper accounts about a series of local murders, Scott, a delivery company driver at the time, began researching and writing a book about a couple, James Daveggio and Michelle Michaud, who committed murders in the county in which Scott lived. In 2001, Kensington Books, as a Pinnacle Books imprint, released his book about the couple's murderous crime spree, titled Rope Burns. In November 2012, Scott appeared on an Investigation Discovery episode of "Deadly Women" about the case.

His 16th book, Shattered Innocence, about kidnap victim Jaycee Dugard, made the New York Times Best Seller list in paperback nonfiction the week of October 2, 2011.

TruTV's "Crime Library" recounted Scott's book Like Father Like Son about the 2000 murder of 9-year-old Krystal Steadman.

He contributed chapters for two anthologies, Masters of True Crime, released in 2012 by Prometheus Books, and Murder Past, Murder Present, released in 2009 by Twilight Times.

Scott appeared in the second series of the TV show Nothing Personal about the Todd Garton case and the plan to kill his wife, Carole Garton, about which Scott wrote the book Kill Or Be Killed. He also appeared in the 2010 documentary Too Young to Kill: 15 Shocking Crimes to talk about 14-year-old Cody Posey and the murder of Posey's father.

== Awards ==
In 2007, Scott was awarded Best East Bay True-Crime Author by the East Bay Express newspaper.

His book Shattered Innocence was named a New York Times bestseller in October 2011.

== Personal life ==
Scott died at his home in Northern California on January 9, 2015.

== Books ==
=== Non-fiction ===
- Rope Burns (2001; rereleased 2010), Pinnacle Books. (ISBN 978-0786022243)
- Savage (2002), Pinnacle Books. (ISBN 978-0786014095)
- Like Father, Like Son (2002), Pinnacle Books. (ISBN 978-0786020751)
- Dangerous Attraction (2003), Pinnacle Books. (ISBN 978-0786015146)
- Married To Murder (2004), Pinnacle Books. (ISBN 978-0786015139)
- Kill Or Be Killed (2004), Pinnacle Books. (ISBN 978-0786019502)
- Unholy Sacrifice (2005), Pinnacle Books. (ISBN 978-0786016839)
- Monster Slayer (2005), Pinnacle Books. (ISBN 978-0786016037)
- Deadfall (2006), Pinnacle Books. (ISBN 978-0786016822)
- Killer Dad: Husband, Father, Murderer (2007), Pinnacle Books. (ISBN 978-0786018185)
- Driven To Murder (2008), Pinnacle Books. (ISBN 978-0786018192)
- Lust To Kill (2009), Pinnacle Books. (ISBN 978-0786018864)
- Rivers of Blood (2009), Pinnacle Books. (ISBN 978-0786019960)
- Most Wanted Killer (2010), Pinnacle Books. (ISBN 978-0786018857)
- Blood Frenzy (2010), Pinnacle Books. (ISBN 978-0786020362)
- Shattered Innocence (2011), Pinnacle Books. (ISBN 978-0786024117)
- The Last Time We Saw Her (2012), Pinnacle Books. (ISBN 978-0786020379)
- And Then She Killed Him (2012), Pinnacle Books. (ISBN 978-0786020386)
- The Girl in the Leaves (2012), Berkley Books. (ISBN 978-0425258828)
- Kill the Ones You Love (2013), Pinnacle Books.
- A Season of Madness (2013), Pinnacle Books.
