= Diablo Valley College =

Public community college in California, US

- Type: Public community college
- Established: 1949
- Parent institution: Contra Costa Community College District
- Faculty: 670
- Students: 22,000
- Location: Pleasant Hill, California, United States; 37°58′17″N 122°4′12″W
- Campus: Suburban
- Colors: Green and white
- Nickname: Vikings
- Website: www.dvc.edu

Diablo Valley College (DVC) is a public community college with campuses in Pleasant Hill and San Ramon in Contra Costa County, California. DVC is one of three public community colleges in the Contra Costa Community College District (along with Contra Costa College and Los Medanos College). It opened in 1949. DVC has more than 22,000 students and 300 full-time and 370 part-time instructors.

== History ==
Diablo Valley College was founded in 1949 as East Contra Costa Junior College. The college enrolls over 22,000 students on two sites.

The student union at DVC is named for Margaret Lesher, widow of Dean Lesher, founder of the Contra Costa Times and cofounder of the Margaret and Dean Lesher Foundation.

=== Grade-fixing scandal ===
In 2007, a six-year grade fixing scheme came to light with allegations that over 70 students used sex or cash as payment to student employees in the admissions and records office in exchange for over 400 grade changes. Many of these students had transferred to universities and in some cases may have already graduated. By November 2007, 49 students had been charged with misdemeanors or felonies over the incident, and at least one had accepted a no contest plea. A spokesperson for the Accrediting Commission for Community and Junior Colleges said that although the scandal was a negative factor it would be unlikely to lead to the school's loss of accreditation.

In the first trial resulting from the grade changes, a former student employee was acquitted of all criminal charges on September 5, 2008. Jurors reached that decision after concluding that prosecutors failed to prove beyond a reasonable doubt that there was a definite link between the former employee and grade changes.

== Academics ==
Student demographics as of Fall 2023
Race and ethnicity	Total
Hispanic	31%
White	30%
Asian	16%
Multiracial	9%
African American	6%
Filipino	5%
Unknown	3%

DVC is a "feeder" college to the University of California, Berkeley; California State University, East Bay; and St. Mary's College. It ranks among the top five transfer colleges in California. In 2004, the top four transfer destinations were California State University, East Bay, San Francisco State University, University of California, Berkeley and University of California, Davis.

DVC also offers a variety of occupational specialties, including hotel/restaurant management, culinary arts, dental technology and real estate. It has an active speech and debating team.

== Athletics ==
DVC offers sports including men's and women's basketball, cross country, swimming and diving, tennis, water polo, baseball, football, lacrosse, track and field (men) and soccer, softball, and volleyball (women).

Willie McGee played baseball for DVC in 1977, and would later win a National League MVP award in 1985. Pitcher Doug Davis also played in the majors from 1999 to 2011.

Demarshay Johnson, a former DVC basketball star who went on to play for the University of Nevada, was named California Community College Athletic Association (CCCAA) first team All-State after the 2004–05 season. That season he led the CCCAA in blocks, averaging 5.2 per game, and was named Bay Valley Conference MVP.

The DVC Viking men's lacrosse program was the first junior college club in California, forming in 2008. In 2013, DVC won the California Junior College Lacrosse Association (CJCLA) championship.

== College newspaper ==
The Inquirer, the college's student-run newspaper, is produced on campus by the Journalism 126 class.

The newspaper was forced to produce its paper off-site at the Contra Costa Times newsroom when a bomb-threat on October 24, 2006, closed the campus and access to the newsroom was restricted.

The Inquirer won General Excellence awards from the Journalism Association of Community Colleges (JACC) in 2006, 2010, 2011 and 2012. The newspaper also won a Pacesetter award from JACC in 1999.

== Notable alumni ==
In addition to the athletes named above, notable alumni of Diablo Valley include:

- Joey Aguilar, professional football player
- Lauren Beck, film producer
- Daniel James Brown, author
- Amit Elor (born 2004), freestyle wrestler, 2024 Olympic champion and 8x world champion
- Kyle Gass, musician
- John Gesek, professional football player
- Dennis Havrilla, professional football player
- Roy Lee, founder and CEO of Cluely
- Corey Luciano, professional football player
- Eva Marie, model and professional wrestler
- Willie McGee, professional baseball player
- George Miller, politician
- Ron Turner, professional football coach
- Matt Overton, professional football player
- Sasmit Pokharel, minister of education and sports of Nepal
- Katharine Ross, actress
- Robert Scott, author
- Jacob Spomer, professional football player
- Julie Strain, model and actress
- De'Ondre Wesley, professional football player
- Timothy P. White, academic administrator
- Greg Wilson, professional football player
