= Greg Wilson (gridiron football) =

American gridiron football player (born 1990)

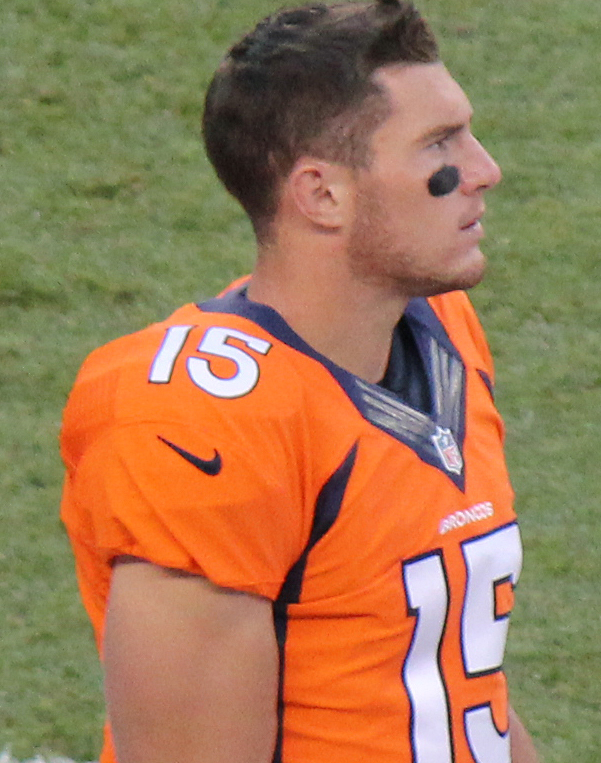
- Wilson with the Denver Broncos in 2014

No. 84
- Position: Wide receiver

Personal information
- Born: September 14, 1990 (age 36); Danville, California, U.S.
- Listed height: 6 ft 0 in (1.83 m)
- Listed weight: 190 lb (86 kg)

Career information
- College: Fordham
- NFL draft: 2013: undrafted

Career history
- Denver Broncos (2014)*; Calgary Stampeders (2015–2016)
- * Offseason or practice squad member only
- Stats at Pro Football Reference
- Stats at CFL.ca

Greg Wilson (born September 14, 1990) is an American former professional football wide receiver.

== College career ==
Wilson transferred from Diablo Valley Community College to Fordham the 2011 and 2012 seasons at Fordham University, where he led the team in 2011 for 539 receiving yards and had 20.7 yards per carry, another team-leading stat. In 2012, Wilson started all 12 games as a senior, placing second on the team in receiving yards. He declared for the 2013 NFL draft, but went undrafted.

== Professional career ==
Wilson was invited to the San Francisco 49ers rookie minicamp but did not make the team. Having no position for the 2013 NFL season, he took up a job as a solar power salesman in San Francisco. Wilson was brought in for a workout in November 2013 but was not signed until January 2014, shortly before the Broncos were to play in the 2014 AFC Championship Game, on the practice squad. Wilson's role was very minimal, acting as one of the Seahawks' receivers on the scout team. Wilson was kept by the Broncos for the 2014 NFL season, staying for the first three preseason games and obtaining 3 receptions for 22 yards. Ultimately, Wilson was cut from the team.

On May 25, 2015, Wilson was signed by the Calgary Stampeders of the Canadian Football League, playing six regular season games and catching 20 passes for a combined 191 yards, including 1 touchdown.
