= Roy Lee (entrepreneur) =

American entrepreneur

Chungin "Roy" Lee
- Lee in 2025
- Born: Chungin Lee; 2003 (age 22–23)
- Education: Diablo Valley College; Columbia University (suspended, dropped out)
- Occupation: Entrepreneur
- Known for: Co-founder and CEO of artificial intelligence company Cluely Founder of Interview Coder

Chungin "Roy" Lee is an American entrepreneur. He is the cofounder and CEO of Cluely, an artificial intelligence company based in New York City. Lee also founded Interview Coder, an AI tool that provides assistance in coding interviews.

== Early life ==
Lee, a Korean American, grew up in Suwanee, Georgia and graduated from Peachtree Ridge High School.

He was accepted to Harvard University but his offer was rescinded after getting caught sneaking out on a field trip in high school by a police officer. Afterward, he enrolled at Diablo Valley College with the intent to transfer to the University of California, Berkeley. After attending Diablo Valley, Lee entered Columbia University.

In early 2024, Lee revealed on LinkedIn that he successfully used Interview Coder during an interview for a software engineer position at Amazon, after which Amazon rescinded his job offer. Columbia University placed him on academic probation due to "a violation of academic integrity." He was later suspended for one year, due to end in May 2026. A letter publicized by Lee on X cited the unauthorized copying and distribution of materials related to the disciplinary proceedings among the reasons for his suspension, consistent with Business Insider's reporting that the suspension concerned the sharing of disciplinary materials rather than the creation or operation of Interview Coder itself. Rather than wait, Lee dropped out of college to work on Cluely.

== Career ==
While studying at Columbia University, Lee and cofounder Neel Shanmugam built Interview Coder, an artificial intelligence tool that "acts as a teleprompter, using your screen and audio to provide real-time analysis, questions, and notes."

Lee and Shanmugam later rebranded Interview Coder to Cluely in April 2025. The company raised $5.3 million in its initial seed round and later garnered $15 million from a Series A round led by Andreessen Horowitz by June.

Immediately after its launch, Cluely gained traction through social media marketing, specifically with the tagline that it could "help you cheat on anything." According to The San Francisco Standard, the company paid for over 60 content creators and 700 video editors as of July 2025. At TechCrunch Disrupt 2025, Lee stated that "Engineers just cannot make good content" and that Cluely's "distribution" strategy through viral content was a big driver of its growth.

Upon launching Cluely and marketing it with the "provocative language" of cheating, several startups pushed back and developed tools that could spot cheating, such as Validia's Truely software. Lee defended his marketing strategy by arguing that any kind of viral attention was crucial to product distribution. By June 2025, however, all references to cheating on job interviews were removed from Cluely's website.

In March 2026, Lee acknowledged that he had previously misrepresented Cluely’s annual recurring revenue in a 2025 interview with TechCrunch. He stated on social media that the $7 million figure he had provided was inaccurate and issued a public retraction. Reporting by TechCrunch noted that the interview had been arranged through the company’s public relations representative rather than being an unsolicited inquiry.
