= Abella Center =

Mixed-use development in San Pablo, California

Coordinates: 37°57′57″N 122°20′35″W

Abella Center formerly International Marketplace and originally El Portal Shopping Center is a mixed-use city services, business, shopping center and housing village transit-oriented development that was formerly a mall in San Pablo, California.

== History ==
=== Origins ===
The mall opened in the 1960s anchored originally by Simon's Department store which later became a Mervyn's department store, HomeBase home improvement store and Safeway supermarket. The mall declined with the exit of Safeway in the 1990s, relocation of Mervyn's to the new Pinole Vista Shopping Center and the bankruptcy of and closure of Home Base stores. The mall began to decline due to its relative distance from the freeway entrances and exits along Interstate 80 even though the highway passes very close by. This decline was also compromised by the rise of the giant Hilltop Mall Shopping Center in nearby Richmond.

=== Redevelopment ===
In the early 2000s the city began a redevelopment plan to revitalize the shopping center with a consulting firm specialized in reviving dead shopping malls. The commercial center was rebranded International Marketplace and touted as an ethnic niche destination shopping area. The former Safeway was remodeled and reopened as an Asian Supermarket. The ex Home Base location was edited into a two-story shopping bazaar with small shop locations. The department store spot and portions of the eastern edge of the mall were demolished and combined with the new business zone as a mixed-use urban village with apartments, condominiums, and attached single-family homes called Abella. A gateway was built over San Pablo Avenue with the name of the center.

The city also added its city hall to the center and attracted the Contra Costa County social services department and library locations to the marketplace. The project was criticized for not displaying "San Pablo" on the archway over the avenue. The city of San Pablo began hosting public events here such as halloween events.

=== Re-creation ===
By the late 2000s the city became frustrated with high vacancies and the inability of the consulting firm to attract a multiplex movie theater as promised and henceforth fired the firm. The San Pablo City Council approved a new plan demolishing more of the shopping center, adding a strip of restaurant and commuter services along San Pablo Avenue and more housing better connected with the rest of the development. At this point the city changed the signage on the gateway to state "Welcome to San Pablo" and renamed the mall to Abella Shopping Center.

== Neighborhood ==
Abella is located adjacent to Contra Costa College and its transit center and has feeder, commuter, student, and late night service from AC Transit bus lines 71, 72, 72R, 74, 76, 376, 607, 609, 669, 673, 674, 676, 677, and 679 these lines connect the center with the surrounding areas including Richmond and El Cerrito del Norte BART stations. There is a BRT station at San Pablo Avenue and the Abella Center. There is also the addition of WestCat services on line C3. The city has rebranded the area as the "Abella District".
