= Los Medanos College =

Community college in Pittsburg, California, US

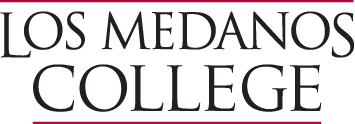
- Type: Public community college
- Established: 1974; 52 years ago
- Parent institution: Contra Costa Community College District
- President: Pamela Ralston
- Students: 6,845
- Location: Pittsburg, California, United States; 38.006°N 121.86°W
- Campus: Suburban
- Colors: Cardinal and gold
- Mascot: Mustangs
- Website: www.losmedanos.edu

Location in the United States
Location in California

Los Medanos College (LMC) is a public community college in Pittsburg, California, United States. It was established in 1974 and is part of the Contra Costa Community College District. LMC also has had an extension in Brentwood since 1998 called the "Brentwood Center".

== History ==
The college's name comes from a misspelling of the former Rancho Los Méganos, a 13,316-acre (53.89 km^{2}) Mexican land grant in the southwestern Sacramento-San Joaquin Delta region of present-day Contra Costa County, California. The rancho was given to José Noriega by Governor José Castro in 1835.

Rancho Los Méganos extended eastward from present-day Antioch, along the San Joaquin River to the Old River. The rancho lands included present-day Oakley, Knightsen, and Brentwood. The name, meaning "inland sand dunes" in Spanish, refers to the sand dunes that characterize its location in eastern Contra Costa County along the Sacramento River and in the foothills of Mt. Diablo.

Opened in 1974, the college is part of Contra Costa Community College District, along with Contra Costa College and Diablo Valley College. Enrollment was 6,845 students in spring 2023.

== Academics ==
There were 25 associate degrees and 30 certificates of achievement available in the 2022–2023 academic year.

== Facilities ==
Several notable programs include:

- Fire Academy (approved by the California State Fire Marshal)
- Honors Transfer Program
- Puente: improving college success and accessibility for Latino students
- MESA (Math, Engineering, Science Achievement Program): facilitating transfer to four-year institutions with majors and bachelor's degrees in science, engineering, computer science and other math-based fields.
- Umoja Scholars: focuses on enriching, fostering, and nurturing the educational experience of African American students.
- AVID (Advancement Via Individual Determination): prepares students to transfer to a four-year school.
- PTEC (Process Technology): aids and prepares students for a career in chemical processing and oil refinery work.

== Notable alumni ==
- Ty Carter, United States Army Staff Sergeant and Medal of Honor recipient
- Lester Conner (born 1959), professional basketball player and coach
- Anthony C. Ferrante, film director, producer and writer
- Andrew Gawer, professional motorcycle road racer and MotoAmerica Supersport competitor.
- Octavio Guzman, professional soccer player
- Jack Larscheid, professional football player
- Sterling Moore, professional football player
- Dave Tollefson, professional football player
- Rich Waltz, television sportscaster
