= Cabrillo College =

Community college in Aptos, California, US

Coordinates: 36.9883°N 121.925°W

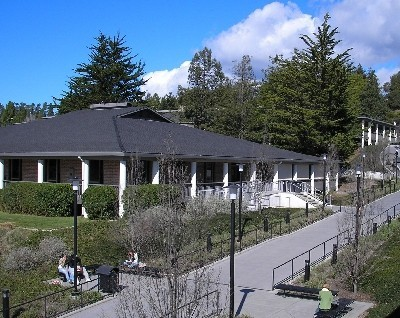
- Cabrillo College John Hurd Enrollment Services Building
- Motto: Concentus (Latin)
- Motto in English: Harmony
- Type: Public community college
- Established: 1959; 67 years ago
- President: Matthew Wetstein
- Faculty: 211 (Full-time) and 323 (Part-time)
- Students: 9,706 (Fall 2022)
- Location: Aptos, California, United States
- Campus: suburban
- Colors: Sky blue, white and black
- Mascot: Sammy the Seahawk
- Website: www.cabrillo.edu

Cabrillo College is a public community college in Aptos, California. It is named after the conquistador Juan Rodríguez Cabrillo and opened in 1959. Cabrillo College has an enrollment of about 9,700 students per term.

== Facilities ==
Classes are offered at two locations: the main campus in Aptos at 6500 Soquel Drive, and the Cabrillo College Watsonville Center, located at 318 Union Street in downtown Watsonville.

Facility planning and major construction has been completed on campus for the Barbara Samper Student Activities Center, and the Cabrillo College Arts Education Complex as well as a Health & Wellness Center (Precision Wellness Center) at the Aptos campus. The main quad in Aptos features a bust honoring Martin Luther King Jr.

In 2007, Cabrillo received a $2.5 million grant from the Economic Development Administration towards the construction of a new Industrial Technology Education Center (ITEC) in Watsonville on the site of the former Watsonville Public Library. Now called the Solari Green Technology Center, the center hosts classes in solar technology, renewable/recycled building materials, and construction management. The new building is LEED Platinum certified, the first for Cabrillo.

In 2013, Cabrillo opened and dedicated the Baskin Engineering, Physics and Computing Center. The center serves as a focal point for STEM classes, and also contains the Monterey Peninsula Foundation STEM Center, which is a central point for STEM student services such as workshops, tutoring and labs.

== Academics ==
Many Cabrillo College students transfer (after 3–5 years) to three nearby universities: the University of California, Santa Cruz, San Jose State University, and California State University, Monterey Bay. Cabrillo ranked first in transfers to University of California, Santa Cruz according to Chancellor George Blumenthal in his address to the Cabrillo College Governing Board in November 2007 and as of 2020 was one of the top community college feeders to UCSC. Cabrillo offers hundreds of courses leading to four-year degrees in many majors. The majority of courses in the Cabrillo curriculum transfer to the University of California or the California State University systems.

Cabrillo's career education is closely connected to the nearby Silicon Valley business environment as well as that of the greater San Francisco Bay Area. Cabrillo College offers programs that lead to skills certificates, certificates of achievement, and associate degrees. In addition, Cabrillo College offers basic skills courses and courses for business, professional and personal development. A variety of not-for-credit classes are available on a fee basis through the Cabrillo College Extension program.

Cabrillo College is accredited by the Accrediting Commission of Community and Junior Colleges.

The library is named after the first president, Robert Swenson, who established Cabrillo and served for over 20 years as president.

== Student Life ==
Student demographics as of Fall 2023
Race and ethnicity	Total
Hispanic	51%
White	38%
Multiracial	5%
Asian	2%
African American	1%
Filipino	1%
Unknown	1%

== Notable alumni ==
- Oliver Tree, Professional Scooterer and Musician
- Brendan Ayanbadejo, professional football player
- Obafemi Ayanbadejo, professional football player
- Sherman Cocroft, professional football player
- Denise Crosby, actress on the TV Series Star Trek: The Next Generation
- Sebastian DeFrancesco, paralympic athlete and table tennis player
- Mark Eichhorn, professional baseball player
- Gary Goldman, animator for Walt Disney Animation Studios and film director for Sullivan Bluth Studios
- Remington Hoffman, actor on the CBS series Days of Our Lives
- Sharon Jordan, actress on the Disney Channel series The Suite Life of Zack & Cody
- Dwight Lowery, professional football player
- Herbert Mullin, American serial killer
- Ethan Klein, online personality, co-star of h3h3Productions
- John Baker Saunders, bassist for Mad Season
- Camryn Manheim, Emmy Award-winning actress on the TV Series The Practice
- Bruce McPherson, former State Assemblyman and Secretary of State of California
- Reggie Stephens, professional football player
- Walmer Martinez, professional soccer player
