= Hartnell College =

Community college in Salinas, California, US

Coordinates: 36°40′28″N 121°39′59″W

- Former name: Salinas Junior College
- Motto: Growing Leaders through Opportunity, Engagement, and Achievement.
- Type: Public community college
- Established: 1920
- Parent institution: California Community Colleges
- Affiliations: Coast Conference
- Budget: $38.5 million (2013–2014)
- President: Michael Gutierrez
- Students: 17,000
- Location: Salinas, California, United States
- Campus: Urban
- Colors: Garnet and gold
- Mascot: Panther
- Website: www.hartnell.edu

Hartnell College is a public community college in Salinas, California. Established in 1920 as Salinas Junior College, Hartnell is one of 115 schools that constitute the California Community Colleges, one of the three higher education systems in California. It enrolls nearly 10,000 students, 56% of whom are Latino, and the college is a Hispanic-serving institution. Its name commemorates William Hartnell (1798–1854), who founded the first junior college in California. Hartnell's main campus is located less than a mile west of downtown Salinas. It also has four satellite campuses, one in the Alisal district of Salinas one in King City another in Soledad and another in Castroville.

== History ==
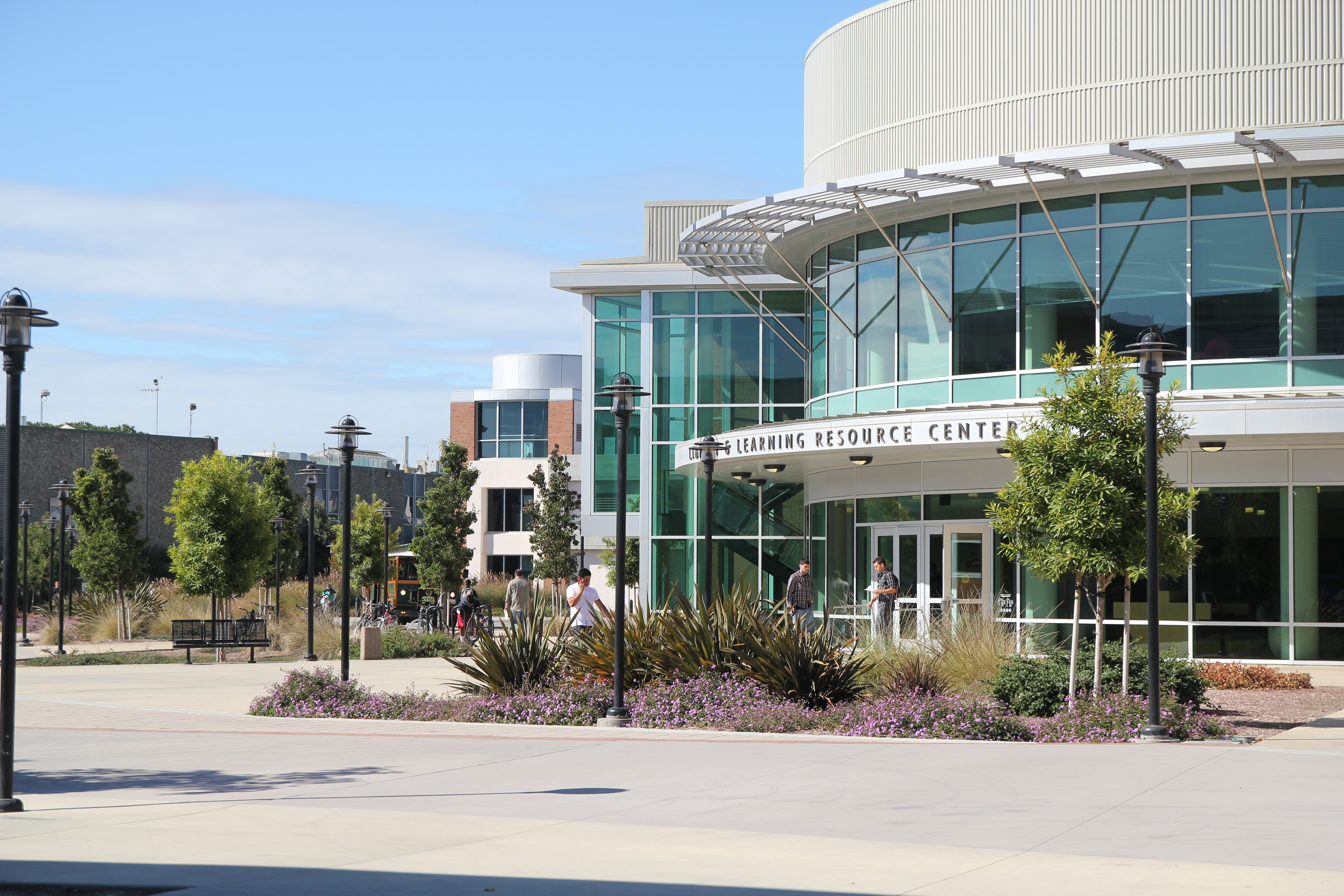
Hartnell College

Hartnell College was founded in 1920 as Salinas Junior College. It was renamed Hartnell College in 1948. The college moved to its current location on Central Avenue in 1936.

== Academics ==
Hartnell College offers certificates and associate degrees at five campuses: Main Campus, Alisal (East Salinas), Castroville, Soledad, and King City. The main campus in South Salinas also includes a Disabled Students Services Center, admissions and records office, financial aid office, Student Union, cafeteria, a parking structure and a library. The college is accredited by the Accrediting Commission for Community and Junior Colleges.

== The Western Stage ==
In 1974, Ron Danko established on campus The Western Stage, a professional theater organization with an educational mission. Initially a summer theatre festival, the Western Stage now produces an annual year-round season of plays, produces school tours, offers internships, and youth classes. The company's productions are part of the college's curriculum, though a separate foundation was established to support the Western Stage. In particular, the Western Stage is known for adapting the work of noted local author John Steinbeck to the stage, often in partnership with the nearby National Steinbeck Center.

== Notable alumni ==
Ernie Camacho (born February 1, 1955) is a former professional baseball player who pitched in the major leagues from 1980 to 1981 and 1983 to 1990 for the Oakland Athletics, Pittsburgh Pirates, Cleveland Indians, Houston Astros, San Francisco Giants, and St. Louis Cardinals.

Greg Fields is a former American football defensive end who played in the National Football League (NFL) for the Detroit Lions (1978) and Baltimore Colts (1979–1981) and in the United States Football League (USFL).

== Gallery ==
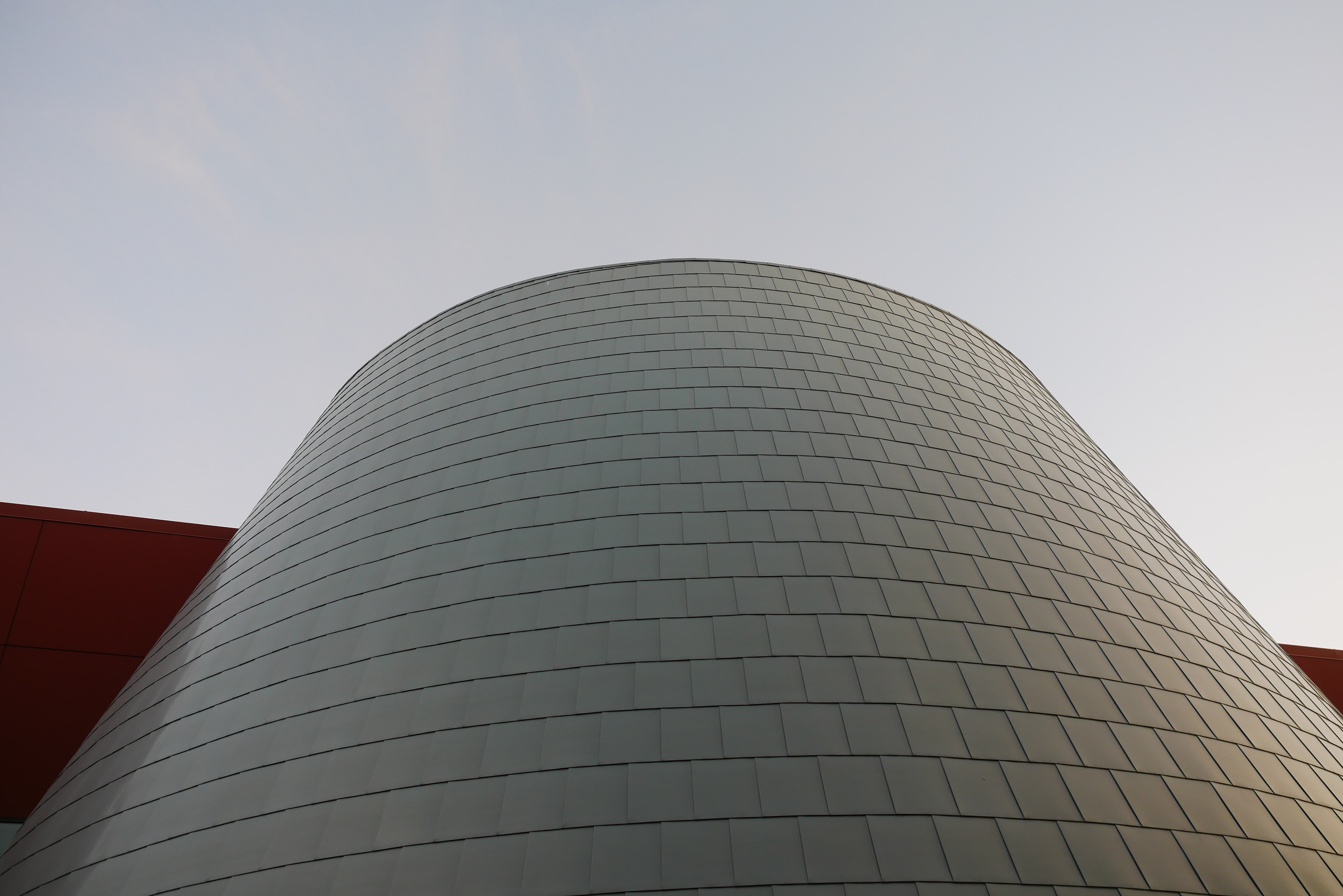
Hartnell College Planetarium exterior

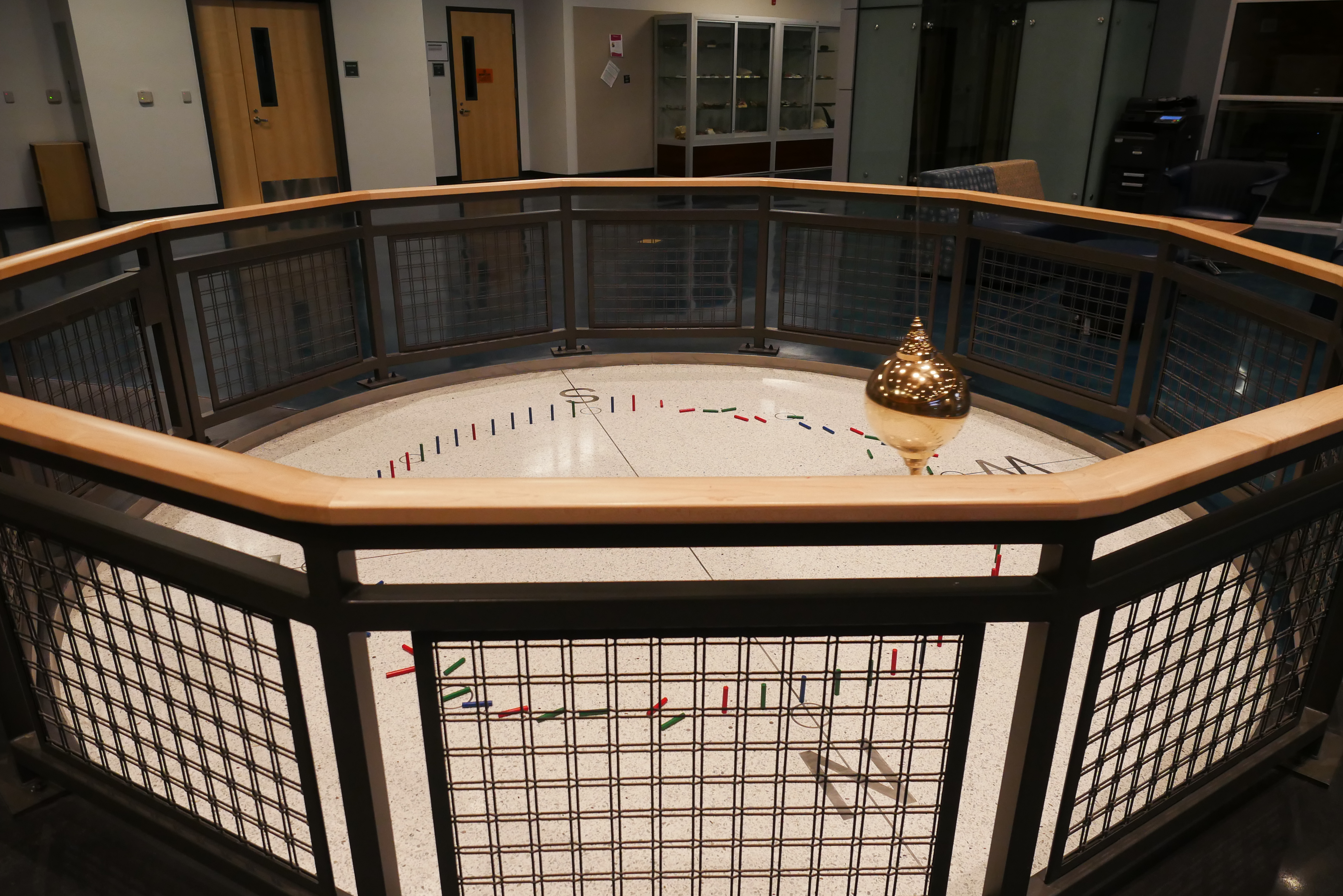
Foucault pendulum used for showing the Earth's rotation

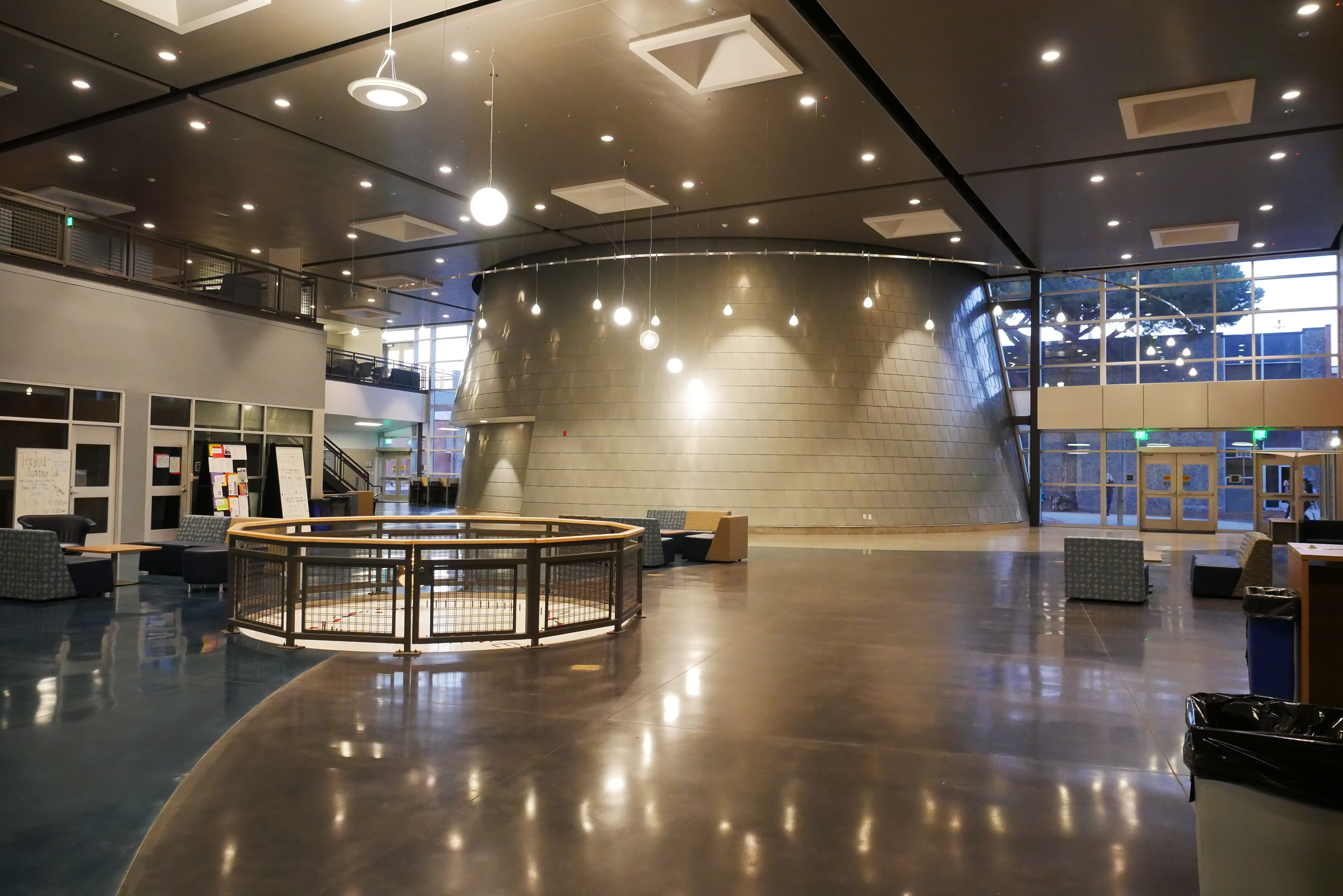
Hartnell College Planetarium interior

Vertical-axis wind turbine at Hartnell College, Alisal Campus, Salinas, California
