= AI notetaker =

Artificial intelligence aiding in note-taking

An AI notetaker is a tool using artificial intelligence to take notes during meetings or other interactions. AI notetakers were created with the intention of eliminating certain office tasks such as keeping detailed minute notes and setting agendas for upcoming meetings and office deliverables. The use of AI notetakers raises ethical questions, including recording meetings without the consent of all participants and the possibility that the notetaker will hallucinate and misrepresent what was said during meetings. There are also concerns when it comes to the privacy and security of meeting data and the sensitive information that lives inside meetings. Through installing these platforms, one is able to focus solely on the task at hand rather than having to record or formulate notes for training or business purposes. However, AI notetakers can also create legal and compliance issues for organizations because meeting recordings and AI-generated transcripts may implicate participant notice and consent, retention, vendor access, biometric data, confidentiality, and attorney-client privilege. Further controversies have developed from the use of AI notetakers such as Cluely to cheat in technical job interviews.

== Technology ==
Large technology companies have integrated transcription capabilities into broader productivity and accessibility tools, including real-time captioning, dictation, and meeting documentation features embedded in operating systems and office platforms. Standalone transcription platforms focus specifically on automated transcription workflows and apply AI-based speech recognition to convert audio and video recordings into text. The software supports transcription in multiple languages and processes recordings uploaded via a web interface as well as through mobile and browser extensions. Tools of this type typically provide editable, time-aligned transcripts and export options for text and subtitle formats, cloud-based processing, multilingual support, and automation in transcription technology. AI speech models have been coded to better understand human speech and the message that needs to be derived from the audio being recorded. Concepts like contextual awareness, emotional intelligence, and real-time capabilities attempt to represent human communication as it is being processed through these note taking softwares.
