= Contra Costa College =

Community college in San Pablo, California, US

- Type: Public community college
- Established: 1946
- Parent institution: Contra Costa Community College District
- Chancellor: Mojdeh Mehdizadeh
- President: Kimberly R. Rogers
- Students: 11,000
- Location: San Pablo, California, United States; 37.966937°N 122.343256°W
- Campus: Suburban
- Colors: Midnight Blue
- Sporting affiliations: Bay Valley Conference
- Mascot: Comets
- Website: www.contracosta.edu

Contra Costa College is a public community college in San Pablo, California, United States. It is the west campus of the Contra Costa Community College District. It is part of the California community colleges system, one of the three college systems in California.

== History ==
The college was founded as West Contra Costa Junior College in 1949, with the first classes held in the spring of 1950 at a temporary location in the shuttered Kaiser Shipyards in Richmond, California. In 1957, a permanent campus was opened on Mission Bell Drive in downtown San Pablo.

The college is flanked by Abella Center to the south.

On May 5th, 2022 the $72 million science center officially opened. This new building features physics, engineering, chemistry, biology, and anatomy labs, along with classrooms and a planetarium. There is also an observation deck on the roof from which telescopes can be mounted for both recreational and research purposes.

Student demographics as of Fall 2023
Race and ethnicity	Total
Hispanic	49%
African American	13%
Asian	13%
White	11%
Multiracial	6%
Filipino	5%
Unknown	2%
Pacific Islander	1%

== Middle College High School ==
The college campus is also home to Middle College High School, whose students take college classes in addition to regular high school courses. The high school is part of the West Contra Costa Unified School District. The current principal is Finy Prak.

== Restaurants ==
The campus has three places that serve food. Pronto is an inexpensive restaurant that serves food prepared by culinary students. Aqua Terra Grill is a high-end, sit-in restaurant with a rotating menu, also run by the culinary students. The on campus cafeteria offers a simple fast-food experience featuring a variety of foods including breakfast, burgers, and pizza. The campus also has food and snacks available for purchase at the bookstore. Middle College High School students receive high school lunches from WCCUSD.

== Student newspaper ==
The Advocate is a student newspaper published at Contra Costa College. The paper is published weekly during the school year and has a circulation of approximately 2,500. An online edition, "cccadvocate," is also published.

The Advocate has won 14 Associated Collegiate Press National Pacemaker Awards since 1990. The newspaper was inducted into the ACP Hall of Fame in 1996, and has been cited by ACP officials as being one of the best examples of small-college journalism.

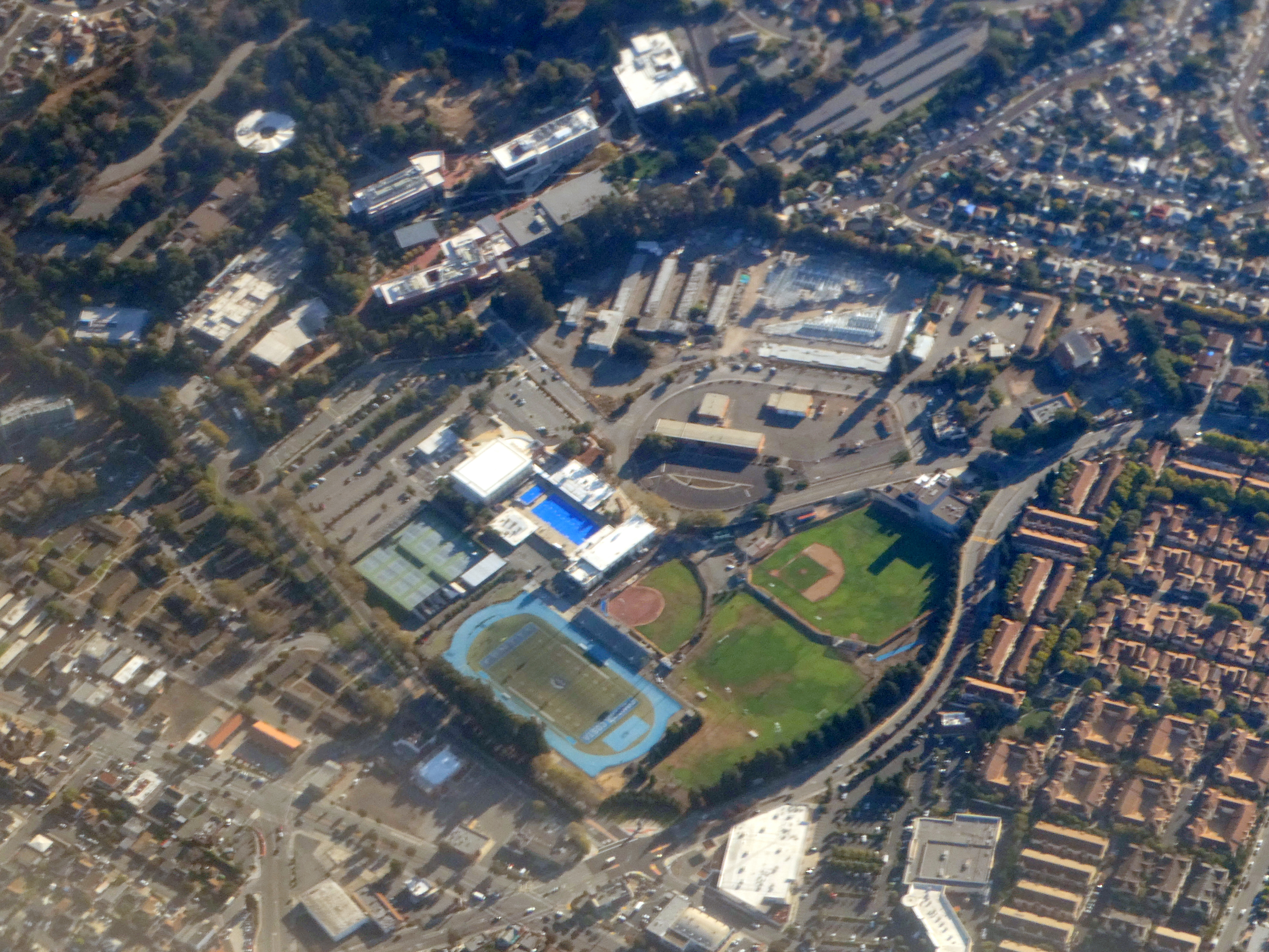
Aerial view of Contra Costa College as of September 2022

== Notable graduates ==
- Courtney Anderson, NFL tight end
- Benny Barnes, NFL cornerback
- Robert Campbell - former member of the state Assembly (1980–1996)
- Chris Dixon, first indoor football quarterback to throw 500 touchdowns
- John Kiffmeyer, (also known as Al Sobrante), the original drummer for the punk rock band Green Day
- Joe Koontz, NFL wide receiver
- Pumpsie Green, MLB first black player to play for the Boston Red Sox
- Jim Landis, MLB center fielder
- Chris Roberson, Philadelphia Phillies player
- Travis Williams, NFL running back
- Jeff Gerstmann, video game journalist (attended)
