= List of museums in the Inland Empire =

The Inland Empire metropolitan area and region of Southern California, which sits directly east of the Los Angeles metropolitan area, covers more than 27,000 square miles (70,000 km^{2}). The metropolitan area consists of Riverside County and San Bernardino County and is home to over 4 million people. The Inland Empire contains many museums, which are defined for this context as institutions (including nonprofit organizations, government entities, and private businesses) that collect and care for objects of cultural, artistic, scientific, or historical interest and make their collections or related exhibits available for public viewing. It includes non-profit and university art galleries. Museums that exist only in cyberspace (i.e., virtual museums) are not included in this list.

Name	Image	Town/city	County	Type	Summary					
11th Armored Cavalry Regiment Museum		Fort Irwin	San Bernardino	Military	website, history of the 11th Armored Cavalry Regiment, located at the Fort Irwin National Training Center					
Agua Caliente Cultural Museum		Palm Springs	Riverside	Native American	History and culture of the Agua Caliente and other indigenous peoples					
Agua Mansa Pioneer Cemetery		Agua Mansa	San Bernardino	History	Branch museum of the San Bernardino County Museum, historic cemetery of the pioneer ghost town and museum					
Beauty Bubble Salon and Museum		Twentynine Palms	San Bernardino	Commodity	Historic hair and beauty care artifacts					
Big Bear Discovery Center		Fawnskin	San Bernardino	Natural history	Co-managed by the Southern California Mountains Foundation and the U.S. Forest Service, natural history of the San Bernardino National Forest					
Big Bear Valley Historical Museum		Big Bear City	San Bernardino	Local history	Operated by the Big Bear Valley Historical Society					
Cabazon Dinosaurs		Cabazon	Riverside	Religious	Dinosaur sculptures and Creationist museum					
Cabot's Pueblo Museum		Desert Hot Springs	Riverside	Historic house	Hopi-style pueblo house with 35 rooms, 150 windows and 65 doors					
Calico Early Man Site		Barstow	San Bernardino	Archaeology	Excavations of a Pleistocene stone tool workshop and quarry sites					
Calico Ghost Town		Calico	San Bernardino	Open air	Ghost silver mining town park with Lane House & Museum of local & mining history, one-room school, blacksmith shop, several original structures					
California Citrus State Historic Park		Riverside	Riverside	Industry	Visitor center includes a museum that presents the origins of citrus, how it arrived in the Americas, and the commercial development of the Bahia Naval orange in Riverside.					
California Route 66 Museum		Victorville	San Bernardino	History	Route 66 and automotive history, cultural and economic impacts					
Center for Social Justice and Civil Liberties		Riverside	Riverside	Society	website, operated by the Riverside Community College District, works of Miné Okubo, themes of civil rights and social justice in the context of 20th-century Riverside					
Chaffey Community Museum of Art		Ontario	San Bernardino	Art	website, operated by the Chaffey Community Art Association					
Chaffey-Garcia House/Museum		Rancho Cucamonga	San Bernardino	Historic house	website, operate by the Etiwanda Historical Society					
The Cheech Marin Center for Chicano Art, Culture & Industry		Riverside	Riverside	Art	website Chicano artwork from across the United States collected by Cheech Marin. Currently under development with a planned opening in 2021.					
Children's Discovery Museum of the Desert		Rancho Mirage	Riverside	Children's	website					
Chino Youth Museum		Chino	San Bernardino	Children's	website					
Coachella Valley History Museum		Indio	Riverside	Open air	website, local culture and history, operated by the Coachella Valley Historical Society, includes the 1926 adobe Smiley-Tyler House with local history exhibits, the 1909 Indio Schoolhouse and the Date Museum. a blacksmith's shop, pioneer farming implements, specialty gardens					
Colton Area Museum		Colton	San Bernardino	Local history						
Cooper Museum		Upland	San Bernardino	Local history	website					
Corona Heritage Park & Museum		Corona	Riverside	Multiple	website, local history, art and culture					
Daggett Museum		Daggett	San Bernardino	Local history	website, includes early American collectibles, railroad china, Navajo Indian code-talkers from WWII, barbed wire, lapidary work					
Desert Discovery Center		Barstow	San Bernardino	Natural history						
Edward-Dean Museum & Gardens		Cherry Valley	Riverside	Fine arts	website, features late 16th to early 19th century European & Asian fine arts set within a recreated manor house, surrounded by beautiful gardens.					
Entomology Research Museum		Riverside	Riverside	Natural history	Insect collection of the Department of Entomology of the University of California, Riverside, open to the public by appointment.					
Estudillo Mansion		San Jacinto	Riverside	Historic house	-	Fingerprints Youth Museum	Hemet	Riverside	Children's	website, formerly KidZone Youth Museum
Fontana Historical Society Museum		Fontana	San Bernardino	Local history	website					
General Patton Memorial Museum		Chiriaco Summit	Riverside	Military	Honors veterans, includes military equipment, uniforms, weapons, medals, artifacts, tanks, memorabilia from Patton's life and career					
Gilman Historic Ranch and Wagon Museum		Banning	Riverside	Local history	Operated by Riverside County Parks, late 19th-century homestead ranch house, museum with a collection of authentic wagons and saddles					
Goffs Schoolhouse		Goffs	San Bernardino	Local history	Restored one-room schoolhouse with displays of local history, operated by the Mojave Desert Heritage and Cultural Association					
Goldstone Deep Space Communications Complex		Barstow	San Bernardino	Science	Tours and museum about the radio telescope and astronomy					
Hemet Museum		Hemet	Riverside	Local history	website					
Heritage House		Riverside	Riverside	Historic house	website, 1891 Victorian house museum, operated by the Museum of Riverside					
Harada House		Riverside	Riverside	Historic house	A National Historic Landmark recognizing one of the most significant civil rights cases in California, operated by the Museum of Riverside. As of February 2015, not yet open to the public.					
Hi-Desert Nature Museum		Yucca Valley	San Bernardino	Multiple	website, artistic, natural and cultural history of the area's deserts					
Historical Glass Museum		Redlands	San Bernardino	Glass	website, operated by the Historical Glass Museum Foundation, examples of American glass					
Historical Society of Palm Desert Museum and Archives		Palm Desert	Riverside	Local History						
Idyllwild Area Historical Society Museum		Idyllwild	Riverside	Local history	website, history of the San Jacinto Mountain communities of Idyllwild, Garner Valley, Mountain Center, Pine Cove, and Pinewood					
Inland Empire Military Museum		San Bernardino	San Bernardino	Military	WWII, Korea and Vietnam military memorabilia, owned by Juan Pollo Restaurant chain, located next door to the first McDonald's Restaurant					
International Banana Museum		Mecca	Riverside	Commodity	website, over 20,000 banana related items, formerly located in Altadena, then Hesperia					
Jensen Alvarado Ranch		Jurupa Valley	Riverside	Local history	1880s period local history ranch					
John Rains House		Cucamonga	San Bernardino	Historic house	Also known as Cucamonga Rancho, mid 19th-century house, branch museum of the San Bernardino County Museum					
Joshua Tree National Park				Natural history	Three visitor centers and the Black Rock Nature Center contain exhibits about the natural and cultural history of the area					
Jude E. Poynter Golf Museum		Palm Desert	Riverside	Sports						
Jurupa Mountains Discovery Center		Jurupa Valley	Riverside	Natural history	website, a family-oriented non-profit earth science educational facility, located outside of Riverside city limits, features Ruth and Sam Kirkby Earth Science Museum					
Kelso Depot		Kelso	San Bernardino	Local history	Railroads, local history, visitor center for the Mojave National Preserve					
Keys Desert Queen Ranch			San Bernardino	Historic house	Historic ranch buildings located in Joshua Tree National Park					
Kimberly Crest		Redlands	San Bernardino	Historic house	French château-style Victorian mansion					
La Quinta Museum		La Quinta	Riverside	Local history	website, features local and traveling exhibits of art, history and culture					
Lincoln Memorial Shrine		Redlands	San Bernardino	Biographical	website shrine and museum about President Abraham Lincoln, special collections division of A. K. Smiley Public Library					
McCallum Adobe-Cornelia White House Museum		Palm Springs	Riverside	Historic house	Operated by the Palm Springs Historical Society, two adjoining late 19th century houses					
Malki Museum		Banning	Riverside	Native American	website, traditions and history of the Cahuilla Indians and other southern California Indian tribes					
March Field Air Museum		Riverside	Riverside	Aviation	Adjacent to March Joint Air Reserve Base, historic military and civilian aircraft					
Menifee History Museum		Menifee	Riverside	Menifee Valley History	https://menifeehistory.com/					
Mission Inn Museum		Riverside	Riverside	Historic site	Cultural heritage of the Mission Inn					
Mojave River Valley Museum		Barstow	San Bernardino	Local history	website, history, culture and natural history of the Mojave River Valley					
Mountain History Museum		Lake Arrowhead	San Bernardino	Local history	website, operated by the Rim of the World Historical Society					
Mousley Museum of Yucaipa History		Yucaipa	San Bernardino	Local history	website, operated by the Yucaipa Valley Historical Society					
Museum of History & Art, Ontario		Ontario	San Bernardino	Multiple	website, history, art, and cultural traditions of the greater Ontario area					
Museum of Pinball		Banning	Riverside	Sports	Museum of Pinball official website.					
Museum of Riverside		Riverside	Riverside	Multiple	Natural history and Native American culture					
Needles Regional Museum		Needles	San Bernardino	Local history						
Oak Glen School House Museum		Yucaipa	San Bernardino	Local history	website, historic schoolhouse					
Old Fire Station Museum		Yucaipa	San Bernardino	Firefighting	website, operated by the Yucaipa Valley Historical Society, US Forest Service artifacts from 1936 to 1980					
Old Guest House Museum		Trona	San Bernardino	Open air	website, operated by the Searles Valley Historical Society, includes exhibits on local mining activities, Native Americans					
Old Schoolhouse Museum		Twentynine Palms	San Bernardino	Local history	website, operated by the Twentynine Palms Historical Society, displays on Indians, miners, cowboys and homesteaders, historic school displays					
Original McDonald's Restaurant Museum		San Bernardino	San Bernardino	Food	Site of the first McDonald's that was open in 1940, memorabilia and history of McDonald's and Juan Pollo restaurants, Route 66 memorabilia					
P-38 Museum		Riverside	Riverside	Aviation	website, history and memorabilia of the Lockheed P-38 Lightning in World War II, housed on the grounds of the March Air Museum					
Palm Springs Air Museum		Palm Springs	Riverside	Aviation	Specializes in World War II aircraft and aviation history					
Palm Springs Art Museum		Palm Springs	Riverside	Art	Modern and Contemporary American art, natural history					
Palo Verde Valley Historical Museum		Blythe	Riverside	Local History	History of Blythe, the Palo Verde Valley, and surrounding areas					
Pennypickle's Workshop		Temecula	Riverside	Children's	website, also known as Temecula Children's Museum					
Perris Valley Historical Museum		Perris	Riverside	Local history	Located in the historic Perris Depot					
Planes of Fame Air Museum		Chino	San Bernardino	Aviation						
Redlands Historical Museum		Redlands	San Bernardino	Local history	website, planned museum operated by the Redlands Historical Museum Association					
Rialto Historical Society Museum		Rialto	San Bernardino	Local history	website, displays include a turn of the century home, a citrus exhibit and packing house office, military display, an early 20th century doctor's office, located in the former church school building next door to the former First Christian Church of Rialto					
Riverside Art Museum		Riverside	Riverside	Art	Over 20 exhibitions a year of traditional and contemporary art					
Riverside International Automotive Museum CLOSED		Riverside	Riverside	Automotive	Closed in June 2016 after the death the Doug Magnon in 2015. The displays included California auto racing history, Dan Gurney, and the largest collection of Mazerati road cars in the United States.					
Riverside Sport Hall of Fame		Riverside	Riverside	Sports	website, an outdoor display in Newman Park recognizing sporting achievements of Riverside citizens					
Robert and Frances Fullerton Museum of Art (RAFFMA)		San Bernardino	San Bernardino	Art	Part of California State University, San Bernardino, collections include Ancient Egyptian artifacts, world ceramics and contemporary art					
Route 66 "Mother Road" Museum		Barstow	San Bernardino	Transportation	website, automobile and Route 66 memorabilia					
Ruddy's General Store Museum		Palm Springs	Riverside	History	website, 1930s period general store with original fixtures and contents					
Salton Sea History Museum		Mecca	Riverside	Local history						
Sam and Alfreda Maloof Foundation for Arts and Crafts		Alta Loma	San Bernardino	Multiple	website, includes crafts gallery and historic home and gardens of Sam Maloof					
San Bernardino County Museum		Redlands	San Bernardino	Multiple	website, cultural and natural history, operates many branch museums					
San Bernardino de Sena Estancia		Redlands	San Bernardino	Historic house	Restored ranch outpost of Mission San Gabriel Arcángel, including a chapel, branch museum of the San Bernardino County Museum; also known as San Bernardino de Sena Estancia					
San Jacinto Museum		San Jacinto	Riverside	Local history	website, natural and human history of San Jacinto and surrounding areas					
San Timoteo Canyon Schoolhouse		Unincorporated	Riverside	Local history	website					
Searles Valley History House		Trona	San Bernardino	Historic house	website, operated by the Searles Valley Historical Society, furnished to appear as in the 1920s when it was occupied by one of the early managers of the Trona Plant					
Sherman Indian Museum		Riverside	Riverside	Native American	History of the boarding high school for Native American students, culture					
Shryock Museum of Embryology		Loma Linda	San Bernardino	Medical	website, part of Loma Linda University School of Medicine, teaching collection of anatomy models and fetuses					
Southern California Railway Museum		Perris	Riverside	Railroad	Heritage railroad and museum about Southern California's railroad history					
Stahl Center & Museum of Culture		Riverside	Riverside	Anthropology	website, part of La Sierra University, located on the second level of La Sierra Hall,					
Sunnylands		Rancho Mirage	Riverside	Historic house	Winter retreat mansion of Walter and Leonore Annenberg					
Temecula Valley Museum		Temecula	Riverside	Local history	website					
UCR ARTSblock		Riverside	Riverside	Art	website, part of the University of California, Riverside, an interactive art facility housed in the renovated Rouse Building, an 1895 department store, includes the California Museum of Photography, Sweeney Art Gallery, and Barbara and Art Culver Center of the Arts					
Victorian Bridal Museum		San Jacinto	Riverside	Textile	website, Victorian-era wedding dresses and accessories					
Victor Valley Museum		Apple Valley	San Bernardino	Local history	website, branch museum of the San Bernardino County Museum					
Walter N. Marks Center for the Arts		Palm Desert	Riverside	Art	website, part of College of the Desert, includes 3 galleries					
Western America Railroad Museum		Barstow	San Bernardino	Railroad						
Western Science Center		Hemet	Riverside	Natural history	Native American artifacts, Ice Age fossils, archaeology, paleontology					
Wignall Museum of Contemporary Art		Rancho Cucamonga	San Bernardino	Art	website, part of Chaffey College					
World Famous Crochet Museum		Joshua Tree	San Bernardino	Crochet	Collection of crocheted items located inside a recycled photo booth.					
World Museum of Natural History		Riverside	Riverside	Natural history	website, part of La Sierra University, animal mounts, gems and minerals, meteorites and tektites, petrified wood, shells, American Indian artifacts, and contemplative stones (Suiseki)					
Ya'i Heki' Regional Indian Museum		Perris	Riverside	Native American	Located in Lake Perris State Recreation Area					
Yanks Air Museum		Chino	San Bernardino	Aviation	Collection of American aircraft including World War II fighters, dive and torpedo bombers					
Yorba-Slaughter Adobe		Chino	San Bernardino	Historic house	Branch museum of the San Bernardino County Museum, includes post office/general store with an exhibit of agriculture and animal husbandry					
Yucaipa Adobe		Yucaipa	San Bernardino	Historic house	website, branch museum of the San Bernardino County Museum					

== Defunct museums ==
- A Special Place Children's Museum, San Bernardino
- Heartland, California Museum of the Heart, Rancho Mirage
- Southern California Medical Museum, Riverside, moved to Western University of Health Sciences in Pomona in 2015

== See also ==
- National Register of Historic Places listings in Riverside County, California
- National Register of Historic Places listings in San Bernardino County, California
