= List of college athletic programs in California =

This is a list of college athletic programs in the U.S. state of California.

== NCAA ==
=== Division I ===
Full NCAA Division I members in California
– FBS football, – FCS football, – No football
Full NCAA Division I members in California
– FBS football, – FCS football, – No football

Team	School	City	Conference	Sport sponsorship						
Team	School	City	Conference	Foot- ball	Basketball		Base- ball	Soft- ball	Soccer	
Team	School	City	Conference	Foot- ball	M	W	Base- ball	Soft- ball	M	W
California Baptist Lancers	California Baptist University	Riverside	Big West	No	Yes	Yes	Yes	Yes	Yes	Yes
Cal Poly Mustangs	California Polytechnic State University	San Luis Obispo	Big West	FCS (Note: Cal Poly and UC Davis's football teams compete in the Big Sky Conference.)	Yes	Yes	Yes	Yes	Yes	Yes
Cal State Bakersfield Roadrunners	California State University, Bakersfield	Bakersfield	Big West	No	Yes	Yes	Yes	Yes	Yes	Yes
Cal State Fullerton Titans	California State University, Fullerton	Fullerton	Big West	No	Yes	Yes	Yes	Yes	Yes	Yes
Cal State Northridge Matadors	California State University, Northridge	Los Angeles	Big West	No	Yes	Yes	Yes	Yes	Yes	Yes
California Golden Bears	University of California, Berkeley	Berkeley	ACC	FBS	Yes	Yes	Yes	Yes	Yes	Yes
Fresno State Bulldogs	California State University, Fresno	Fresno	Pac-12	FBS	Yes	Yes	Yes	Yes	No	Yes
Long Beach State Beach (or "The Beach")	California State University, Long Beach	Long Beach	Big West	No	Yes	Yes	Yes	Yes	No	Yes
Loyola Marymount Lions	Loyola Marymount University	Los Angeles	West Coast	No	Yes	Yes	Yes	Yes	Yes	Yes
Pacific Tigers	University of the Pacific	Stockton	West Coast	No	Yes	Yes	Yes	Yes	Yes	Yes
Pepperdine Waves	Pepperdine University	Malibu	West Coast	No	Yes	Yes	Yes	No	No	Yes
Sacramento State Hornets	California State University, Sacramento	Sacramento	Big West	FBS (Note: Sacramento State's football team competes in the Mid-American Conference.)	Yes	Yes	Yes	Yes	Yes	Yes
Saint Mary's Gaels	Saint Mary's College of California	Moraga	West Coast	No	Yes	Yes	Yes	Yes	Yes	Yes
San Diego Toreros	University of San Diego	San Diego	West Coast	FCS (Note: San Diego's football team competes in the Pioneer Football League.)	Yes	Yes	Yes	Yes	Yes	Yes
San Diego State Aztecs	San Diego State University	San Diego	Pac-12	FBS	Yes	Yes	Yes	Yes	Yes	Yes
San Francisco Dons	University of San Francisco	San Francisco	West Coast	No	Yes	Yes	Yes	No	Yes	Yes
San Jose State Spartans	San José State University	San Jose	Mountain West	FBS	Yes	Yes	Yes	Yes	Yes	Yes
Santa Clara Broncos	Santa Clara University	Santa Clara	West Coast	No	Yes	Yes	Yes	Yes	Yes	Yes
Stanford Cardinal	Stanford University	Stanford	ACC	FBS	Yes	Yes	Yes	Yes	Yes	Yes
UC Davis Aggies	University of California, Davis	Davis	Mountain West	FCS	Yes	Yes	Yes	Yes	Yes	Yes
UC Irvine Anteaters	University of California, Irvine	Irvine	Big West	No	Yes	Yes	Yes	No	Yes	Yes
UCLA Bruins	University of California, Los Angeles	Los Angeles	Big Ten	FBS	Yes	Yes	Yes	Yes	Yes	Yes
UC Riverside Highlanders	University of California, Riverside	Riverside	Big West	No	Yes	Yes	Yes	Yes	Yes	Yes
UC San Diego Tritons	University of California, San Diego	San Diego	Big West	No	Yes	Yes	Yes	Yes	Yes	Yes
UC Santa Barbara Gauchos	University of California, Santa Barbara	Santa Barbara	Big West	No	Yes	Yes	Yes	Yes	Yes	Yes
USC Trojans and Women of Troy	University of Southern California	Los Angeles	Big Ten	FBS	Yes	Yes	Yes	No	No	Yes

=== Division II ===
Team	School	City	Conference	Sport sponsorship					
Team	School	City	Conference	Basketball		Base- ball	Soft- ball	Soccer	
Team	School	City	Conference	M	W	Base- ball	Soft- ball	M	W
Biola Eagles	Biola University	La Mirada	PacWest	Yes	Yes	Yes	Yes	Yes	Yes
Cal Poly Humboldt Lumberjacks	California State Polytechnic University, Humboldt	Arcata	CCAA	Yes	Yes	No	Yes	Yes	Yes
Cal Poly Pomona Broncos	California State Polytechnic University, Pomona	Pomona	CCAA	Yes	Yes	Yes	No	Yes	Yes
Cal State Dominguez Hills Toros	California State University, Dominguez Hills	Carson	CCAA	Yes	Yes	Yes	Yes	Yes	Yes
Cal State East Bay Pioneers	California State University, East Bay	Hayward	CCAA	Yes	Yes	Yes	Yes	Yes	Yes
Chico State Wildcats	California State University, Chico	Chico	CCAA	Yes	Yes	Yes	Yes	Yes	Yes
Cal State Los Angeles Golden Eagles	California State University, Los Angeles	Los Angeles	CCAA	Yes	Yes	Yes	No	Yes	Yes
Cal State Monterey Bay Otters	California State University, Monterey Bay	Seaside	CCAA	Yes	Yes	Yes	Yes	Yes	Yes
Cal State San Bernardino Coyotes	California State University, San Bernardino	San Bernardino	CCAA	Yes	Yes	Yes	Yes	Yes	Yes
Cal State San Marcos Cougars	California State University, San Marcos	San Marcos	CCAA	Yes	Yes	Yes	Yes	Yes	Yes
Concordia Eagles	Concordia University, Irvine	Irvine	PacWest	Yes	Yes	Yes	Yes	Yes	Yes
Dominican Penguins	Dominican University of California	San Rafael	PacWest	Yes	Yes	No	Yes	Yes	Yes
Fresno Pacific Sunbirds	Fresno Pacific University	Fresno	CCAA	Yes	Yes	Yes	No	Yes	Yes
Jessup Warriors	Jessup University	Rocklin	PacWest	Yes	Yes	Yes	Yes	Yes	Yes
Menlo Oaks	Menlo College	Atherton	CCAA	Yes	Yes	Yes	Yes	Yes	Yes
UC Merced Golden Bobcats	University of California, Merced	Merced	CCAA	Yes	Yes	No	No	Yes	Yes
Point Loma Nazarene Sea Lions	Point Loma Nazarene University	San Diego	PacWest	Yes	Yes	Yes	No	Yes	Yes
San Francisco State Gators	San Francisco State University	San Francisco	CCAA	Yes	Yes	Yes	Yes	No	Yes
Stanislaus State Warriors	California State University, Stanislaus	Turlock	CCAA	Yes	Yes	Yes	Yes	Yes	Yes
Vanguard Lions	Vanguard University	Costa Mesa	PacWest	Yes	Yes	Yes	Yes	Yes	Yes
Westmont Warriors	Westmont College	Santa Barbara	PacWest	Yes	Yes	Yes	No	Yes	Yes

=== Division III ===
Team	School(s)	City	Conference	Sport sponsorship						
Team	School(s)	City	Conference	Foot- ball	Basketball		Base- ball	Soft- ball	Soccer	
Team	School(s)	City	Conference	Foot- ball	M	W	Base- ball	Soft- ball	M	W
Azusa Pacific Cougars	Azusa Pacific University	Azusa	Southern California	Yes	Yes	Yes	Yes	Yes	Yes	Yes
Cal Lutheran Kingsmen and Regals	California Lutheran University	Thousand Oaks	Southern California	Yes	Yes	Yes	Yes	Yes	Yes	Yes
Caltech Beavers	California Institute of Technology	Pasadena	Southern California	No	Yes	Yes	Yes	No	Yes	Yes
Chapman Panthers	Chapman University	Orange	Southern California	Yes	Yes	Yes	Yes	Yes	Yes	Yes
Claremont-Mudd-Scripps Stags and Athenas	Claremont McKenna College; Harvey Mudd College; Scripps College	Claremont	Southern California	Yes	Yes	Yes	Yes	Yes	Yes	Yes
La Verne Leopards	University of La Verne	La Verne	Southern California	Yes	Yes	Yes	Yes	Yes	Yes	Yes
Occidental Tigers	Occidental College	Los Angeles	Southern California	No	Yes	Yes	Yes	Yes	Yes	Yes
Pomona-Pitzer Sagehens	Pomona College; Pitzer College	Claremont	Southern California	Yes	Yes	Yes	Yes	Yes	Yes	Yes
Redlands Bulldogs	University of Redlands	Redlands	Southern California	Yes	Yes	Yes	Yes	Yes	Yes	Yes
UC Santa Cruz Banana Slugs	University of California, Santa Cruz	Santa Cruz	Coast to Coast	No	Yes	Yes	No	No	Yes	Yes
Whittier Poets	Whittier College	Whittier	Southern California	Yes	Yes	Yes	Yes	Yes	Yes	Yes

== NAIA ==
Team	School	City	Conference	Sport sponsorship						
Team	School	City	Conference	Basketball		Base- ball	Soft- ball	Soccer		
Team	School	City	Conference	M	W	Base- ball	Soft- ball	M	W	Football
Hope International Royals	Hope International University	Fullerton	GSAC	Yes	Yes	Yes	Yes	Yes	Yes	No
La Sierra Golden Eagles	La Sierra University	Riverside	GSAC	Yes	Yes	Yes	Yes	Yes	Yes	No
Life Pacific Warriors	Life Pacific University	San Dimas	GSAC	Yes	Yes	No	No	Yes	Yes	No
The Master's Mustangs	The Master's University	Santa Clarita	GSAC	Yes	Yes	Yes	No	Yes	Yes	No
Pacific Union Pioneers	Pacific Union College	Angwin	Cal Pac	Yes	Yes	No	No	Yes	No	No
Simpson Red Hawks	Simpson University	Redding	Cal Pac	Yes	Yes	Yes	Yes	Yes	Yes	Yes (Note: Simpson football team competes in the Frontier Conference.)
Soka Lions	Soka University of America	Aliso Viejo	GSAC	No	No	No	No	Yes	Yes	No
Stanton Elks	Stanton University (Note: Stanton also competes in the USCAA.)	Anaheim	Cal Pac	Yes	Yes	No	No	Yes	Yes	No
Westcliff Warriors	Westcliff University	Irvine	Cal Pac	Yes	Yes	Yes	Yes	Yes	Yes	No

== CCCAA ==
Team	School	City	Conference
Alameda Cougars	College of Alameda	Alameda	Bay Valley
Allan Hancock Bulldogs	Allan Hancock College	Santa Maria	Western State
American River Beavers	American River College	Sacramento	Big 8
Antelope Valley Marauders	Antelope Valley College	Lancaster	Western State
Bakersfield Renegades	Bakersfield College	Bakersfield	Western State
Barstow Vikings	Barstow Community College	Barstow	Inland Empire
Butte Roadrunners	Butte College	Oroville	Golden Valley
Cabrillo Seahawks	Cabrillo College	Aptos	Coast
Cañada Colts	Cañada College	Redwood City	Coast
Canyons Cougars	College of the Canyons	Santa Clarita	Western State
Cerritos Falcons	Cerritos College	Norwalk	South Coast
Cerro Coso Coyotes	Cerro Coso Community College	Ridgecrest	Inland Empire
Chabot Gladiators	Chabot College	Hayward	Coast
Chaffey Panthers	Chaffey College	Rancho Cucamonga	Inland Empire
Citrus Fighting Owls	Citrus College	Glendora	Western State
Clovis Crush	Clovis Community College	Fresno	Central Valley
Coalinga Falcons	Coalinga College	Coalinga	Central Valley
Columbia Claim Jumpers	Columbia College	Sonora	Central Valley
Compton Tartars	Compton College	Compton	South Coast
Contra Costa Comets	Contra Costa College	San Pablo	Bay Valley
Copper Mountain Fighting Cacti	Copper Mountain College	Joshua Tree	Inland Empire
Cosumnes River Hawks	Cosumnes River College	Sacramento	Big 8
Crafton Hills Roadrunners	Crafton Hills College	Yucaipa	Inland Empire
Cuesta Cougars	Cuesta College	San Luis Obispo	Western State
Cuyamaca Coyotes	Cuyamaca College	El Cajon	Pacific Coast
Cypress Chargers	Cypress College	Cypress	Orange Empire
De Anza Mountain Lions	De Anza College	Cupertino	Coast
Desert Roadrunners	College of the Desert	Palm Desert	Inland Empire
Diablo Valley Vikings	Diablo Valley College	Pleasant Hill	Big 8
East Los Angeles Huskies	East Los Angeles College	Monterey Park	South Coast
El Camino Warriors	El Camino College	Torrance	South Coast
Evergreen Valley Hawks	Evergreen Valley College	San Jose	Coast
Feather River Golden Eagles	Feather River College	Quincy	Golden Valley
Folsom Lake Falcons	Folsom Lake College	Folsom	Big 8
Foothill Owls	Foothill College	Los Altos Hills	Coast
Fresno City Rams	Fresno City College	Fresno	Central Valley
Fullerton Hornets	Fullerton College	Fullerton	Orange Empire
Gavilan Rams	Gavilan College	Gilroy	Coast
Glendale Vaqueros	Glendale Community College	Glendale	Western State
Golden West Rustlers	Golden West College	Huntington Beach	Orange Empire
Grossmont Griffins	Grossmont College	El Cajon	Pacific Coast
Hartnell Panthers	Hartnell College	Salinas	Coast
Imperial Valley Desert Warriors	Imperial Valley College	Imperial	Pacific Coast
Irvine Valley Lasers	Irvine Valley College	Irvine	Orange Empire
Lake Tahoe Coyotes	Lake Tahoe Community College	South Lake Tahoe	Golden Valley
Laney Eagles	Laney College	Oakland	Bay Valley
Las Positas Hawks	Las Positas College	Livermore	Coast
Lassen Cougars	Lassen College	Susanville	Golden Valley
Lemoore Golden Eagles	Lemoore College	Lemoore	Central Valley
Long Beach City Vikings	Long Beach City College	Long Beach	South Coast
Los Angeles Harbor Seahawks	Los Angeles Harbor College	Wilmington	South Coast
Los Angeles Mission Eagles	Los Angeles Mission College	Sylmar	Western State
Los Angeles Pierce Brahmas	Los Angeles Pierce College	Woodland Hills	Western State
Los Angeles Southwest Cougars	Los Angeles Southwest College	Los Angeles	South Coast
Los Angeles Trade Tech Beavers	Los Angeles Trade-Technical College	Los Angeles	South Coast
Los Angeles Valley Monarchs	Los Angeles Valley College	Valley Glen	Western State
Los Medanos Mustangs	Los Medanos College	Pittsburg	Bay Valley
Marin Mariners	College of Marin	Novato	Bay Valley
Mendocino Eagles	Mendocino College	Ukiah	Bay Valley
Merced Blue Devils	Merced College	Merced	Central Valley
Merritt Thunderbirds	Merritt College	Oakland	Bay Valley
MiraCosta Spartans	MiraCosta College	Oceanside	Pacific Coast
Mission Saints	Mission College	Santa Clara	Coast
Modesto Pirates	Modesto Junior College	Modesto	Big 8
Monterey Peninsula Lobos	Monterey Peninsula College	Monterey	Coast
Moorpark Raiders	Moorpark College	Moorpark	Western State
Mt. San Antonio Mounties	Mt. San Antonio College	Walnut	South Coast
Mt. San Jacinto Eagles	Mt. San Jacinto College	San Jacinto	Inland Empire
Napa Valley Storm	Napa Valley College	Napa	Bay Valley
Norco Mustangs	Norco College	Norco	Inland Empire
Ohlone Renegades	Ohlone College	Fremont	Coast
Orange Coast Pirates	Orange Coast College	Costa Mesa	Orange Empire
Oxnard Condors	Oxnard College	Oxnard	Western State
Palo Verde Pirates	Palo Verde College	Blythe	Inland Empire
Palomar Comets	Palomar College	San Marcos	Pacific Coast
Pasadena City Lancers	Pasadena City College	Pasadena	South Coast
Porterville Pirates	Porterville College	Porterville	Central Valley
Redwoods Corsairs	College of the Redwoods	Eureka	Golden Valley
Reedley Tigers	Reedley College	Reedley	Central Valley
Rio Hondo Roadrunners	Rio Hondo College	Whittier	South Coast
Riverside Tigers	Riverside City College	Riverside	Orange Empire
Sacramento City Panthers	Sacramento City College	Sacramento	Big 8
Saddleback Bobcats	Saddleback College	Mission Viejo	Orange Empire
San Bernardino Valley Wolverines	San Bernardino Valley College	San Bernardino	Inland Empire
San Diego City Knights	San Diego City College	San Diego	Pacific Coast
San Diego Mesa Olympians	San Diego Mesa College	San Diego	Pacific Coast
San Diego Miramar Jets	San Diego Miramar College	San Diego	Pacific Coast
San Francisco Rams	City College of San Francisco	San Francisco	Coast
San Joaquin Delta Mustangs	San Joaquin Delta College	Stockton	Big 8
San Jose Jaguars	San Jose City College	San Jose	Coast
San Mateo Bulldogs	College of San Mateo	San Mateo	Coast
Santa Ana Dons	Santa Ana College	Santa Ana	Orange Empire
Santa Barbara City Vaqueros	Santa Barbara City College	Santa Barbara	Western State
Santa Monica Corsairs	Santa Monica College	Santa Monica	Western State
Santa Rosa Bear Cubs	Santa Rosa Junior College	Santa Rosa	Big 8
Santiago Canyon Hawks	Santiago Canyon College	Orange	Orange Empire
Sequoias Giants	College of the Sequoias	Visalia	Central Valley
Shasta Knights	Shasta College	Redding	Golden Valley
Sierra Wolverines	Sierra College	Rocklin	Big 8
Siskiyous Eagles	College of the Siskiyous	Weed	Golden Valley
Skyline Trojans	Skyline College	San Bruno	Coast
Solano Falcons	Solano Community College	Fairfield	Bay Valley
Southwestern Jaguars	Southwestern College	Chula Vista	Pacific Coast
Taft Cougars	Taft College	Taft	Central Valley
Ventura Pirates	Ventura College	Ventura	Western State
Victor Valley Rams	Victor Valley College	Victorville	Inland Empire
West Los Angeles Wildcats	West Los Angeles College	Culver City	Western State
West Valley Vikings	West Valley College	Saratoga	Coast
Yuba 49ers	Yuba College	Marysville	Bay Valley

== NCCAA ==
Team	School	City	Conference
Bethesda Flames	Bethesda University	Anaheim	Division 1-West
Nobel Knights	Nobel University	Buena Park	Division 1-West
West Coast Baptist Eagles	West Coast Baptist College	Lancaster	Division 1-West

== NJCAA ==
Team	School	City	Conference
Community Christian Saints	Community Christian College	Redlands	ACCAC

== See also ==
- List of NCAA Division I institutions
- List of NCAA Division II institutions
- List of NCAA Division III institutions
- List of NAIA institutions
- List of USCAA institutions
- List of NCCAA institutions
