= Heritage House =

Heritage House may refer to:

- Sheffield Royal Infirmary, a former hospital in Sheffield, South Yorkshire, England.
- Heritage House (brewery), once part of the Iron City Brewing Company in Pittsburgh, Pennsylvania, United States.
- The Heritage House, a non-profit kiruv organization in Jerusalem.
- Heritage House, a former hotel in Marquette, Michigan, United States, now known as the Landmark Inn
- Heritage houses of the Philippines

== Museums ==
- Heritage House (Compton, California), California Historical Landmark #664.
- Heritage House (Irving, Texas), an historic home operated by the Irving Heritage Society
- Heritage House (Riverside, California), an historic home operated by the Museum of Riverside in Riverside, California, United States.
- Heritage House (Smiths Falls, Ontario), a museum in Ontario, Canada.
- Key West Heritage House Museum and Robert Frost Cottage, a museum in Key West, Florida, United States.
