= RCC Marching Tigers =

Marching Band of Riverside City College

RCC Marching Tigers Riverside City College Marching Band
- School: Riverside City College
- Location: Riverside, California
- Conference: Orange Empire Conference
- Founded: 1984
- Director: James Rocillo
- Members: 200+

The RCC Marching Tigers or "Hollywood's Band" is the marching band of Riverside City College. The band has appeared in parades such as the Tournament of Roses Parade, Fiesta Bowl Parade, the Hollywood Christmas Parade, the Macy's Thanksgiving Day Parade, various athletic events, Bands of America Grand Nationals in exhibition, as well as appearances in television shows, commercials, music videos, and movies.

== History ==
The RCC Marching Tigers started in 1984 by director Gary Locke, who formerly directed John W. North High School's Blue Star Regiment (BSR). The Tigers were formerly a competitive marching band, but eventually moved on to bigger projects after placing first in every competition they competed in for eleven years in a row. The group performs as an exhibition band, performing at many WBA and Bands of America Grand National competitions and appearing in many motion pictures, television shows, television commercials, and other events.

== Around the World ==
Year	Location
1985	Fete de Geneve
1986	Victoria Day Parade, Vancouver, Canada
1987	Sendai Sister City Exchange Concert & All Japan Marching Band & Baton Twirling Association Contest
1990	Rose Parade
1993	All Japan Marching Band & Baton Twirling Association Contest
1992	Moomba Festivale Parade, Melbourne, Australia
1994	Nice, France & Euro Disneyland
1996	St. Patrick’s Day Parade, Dublin, Ireland
1997	Rose Parade
2000	London Millennium Parade Festival, England
2001	Paris New Year's Parade, France
2003	Edinburgh Easter Festival
2004	Rose Parade
2004	Madrid Christmas Festival
2005	London New Year's Day Parade
2006	Macy's Thanksgiving Day Parade
2007	Comune di Frascati
2008	New Year’s Day performance at the Coliseum, Rome, Italy
2009	Rose Parade
2013	Rose Parade
2015	Rose Parade
2016	La Grande Parade de Paris, Champs-Élysées
2018	Rose Parade
2018	Macy’s Thanksgiving Day Parade

== On Screen ==
The RCC Marching Tigers have appeared in many major motion pictures, television shows, and television commercials, as well as music videos. They got their start in the entertainment industry in 1990 with their first television appearance in the Pasadena Tournament of Roses Parade. Shortly after, the Riverside Auto Center wanted to advertise their local business and hired the Marching Tigers and the RCC Pep Squad to be part of a huge television media campaign. The television commercials appeared on local Public-access television cable TV and then on ESPN. It is this exposure on ESPN that helped the Tigers gain media prominence and push them into the entertainment industry.

Since then, the RCC Marching Tigers' entertainment repertoire has been steadily growing.

The Silver Screen
Film	Starring	Studio
My Blue Heaven	Steve Martin	Warner Brothers
Hero	Dustin Hoffman, Andy Garcia, Geena Davis	Columbia
Dear God	Greg Kinnear, Laurie Metcalf	Rysher Entertainment
Good Burger	Kenan Thompson, Kel Michell, Sinbad	Nickelodeon Movies
Austin Powers: International Man of Mystery	Mike Myers, Elizabeth Hurley	New Line Cinema
Wag the Dog	Robert De Niro, Dustin Hoffman	New Line Cinema
The Truman Show	Jim Carey, Laura Linney, Ed Harris	Paramount
The Other Sister	Juliette Lewis, Giovanni Ribisi, Tom Skerritt, Diane Keaton	Touchstone
Ready to Rumble	Oliver Platt, David Arquette, Scott Caan	Warner Brothers
American Pie 2	Jason Biggs, Shannon Elizabeth	Universal
The First 20 Million is Always the Hardest	Adam Garcia, Jake Busey, Ethan Suplee, Rosario Dawson, Anjul Nigam, Francis Benoit, Gregory Jbara	20th Century Fox
Princess Diaries 2	Anne Hathaway, Heather Matarazzo, Julie Andrews, John Rhys-Davies	Walt Disney Pictures
American Pie: Band Camp	Eugene Levy, Tad Hilgenbrink, Arielle Kebbel	Universal
Coach Carter	Samuel L. Jackson	Warner Brothers
Even Money	Kim Basinger, Nick Cannon, Danny DeVito, Kelsey Grammer	Yari Film Group
Gridiron Gang	The Rock	Sony Pictures
Bring It On: In It to Win It”		Universal
Bratz		Lionsgate
The Eye	Jessica Alba	Lionsgate
FAME	Naturi Naughton, Kelsey Grammer	MGM

Television Productions
Show	Starring	Network
Monk	Tony Shalhoub	USA Network
Boston Public	Anthony Heald, Chi BcBride	20th Century Fox
Big Deal	Big Bad VooDoo Daddy	20th Century Fox
Charmed	Holly Marie Combs, Alyssa Milano, Rose McGowan	Warner Brothers
Gilmore Girls	Lauren Graham, Alexis Bledel	Warner Brothers
Once and Again	Sela Ward	ABC
Monday Night Live	Todd Donahoe	ABC
America’s Funniest Home Videos	Bob Saget	ABC
That Championship Season	Paul Sorvino, Gary Sinese	Show Time
Inherit the Wind	George C. Scott	Show Time
The Positively True Adventures of the Alleged Texas Cheerleader-Murdering Mom	Holly Hunter, Beau Bridges	HBO
For Their Own Good	Elizabeth Perkins	The Avenet/Kerner Company
American Dreams	Gail O’Grady, Tom Verica, Brittany Snow	NBC
The Bachelor	Chris Harrison	ABC
Good Morning America	Diane Sawyer, Sam Champion	ABC
The Game	Tia Mowry, Wendy Raquel Robinson, Brittany Daniel	The CW
I Want To Look Like A High School Cheerleader Again	Jay Johnson	CMT
Veronica Mars	Kristen Bell	CMT
Hell’s Kitchen	Gordon Ramsay	Fox
Parks and Recreation	Amy Poehler, Nick Offerman	NBC
The Office	Steve Carell, Jenna Fischer, John Krasinski, Rainn Wilson	NBC

Television Commercials
The Riverside Auto Center	Aloha Airlines	Peugeot Automobiles
Wendy’s Hamburgers	Jeep Cherokee	Outpost.com
McDonald’s Restaurants	Kentucky Fried Chicken	American Eagle Outfitters
JCPenney	PepsiCola	Six Flags Magic Mountain
Mead Five Star	Anheuser-Busch	Verizon Wireless

Music Videos
Song	Artist	Label
The Animal Song	Savage Garden	Sony
I Won't Lie	Shannon Brown	BMG/Arista Records
Blowin' Me Up (With Her Love)	JC Chasez	Jive Records
B.Y.O.B.	System of a Down	Sony
Underclass Hero	Sum 41	Island Records
That's Not My Name	The Ting Tings	Sony
Sports Song	"Weird Al" Yankovic	RCA Records

== RCC Indoor Percussion ==
In addition to a full marching band, Riverside City College fields an indoor drumline. RCC Indoor Percussion competes in world class for Winter Guard International (WGI) and is a program of BD Performing arts, the entity who manages the Blue Devils Drum and Bugle Corps. RCC Indoor Percussion has been a WGI World Class finalist every year since 2002, winning titles in 2002, 2005, 2007, 2012, 2015, 2018 and 2025.
