= Moreno Valley College =

Community college in Moreno Valley, California, US

- Former name: Riverside Community College - Moreno Valley Campus
- Type: Public community college
- Established: March 1, 2010
- Parent institution: Riverside Community College District, California Community Colleges System
- President: Rudy Besikof
- Students: 20,187
- Location: Moreno Valley, California, United States; 33.887232°N 117.203118°W
- Campus: suburban
- Colors: Teal, black, white
- Mascot: Mountain Lion
- Website: www.mvc.edu

Moreno Valley College (MVC) is a public community college in Moreno Valley, California. The college is part of the Riverside Community College District and the larger California Community Colleges System.

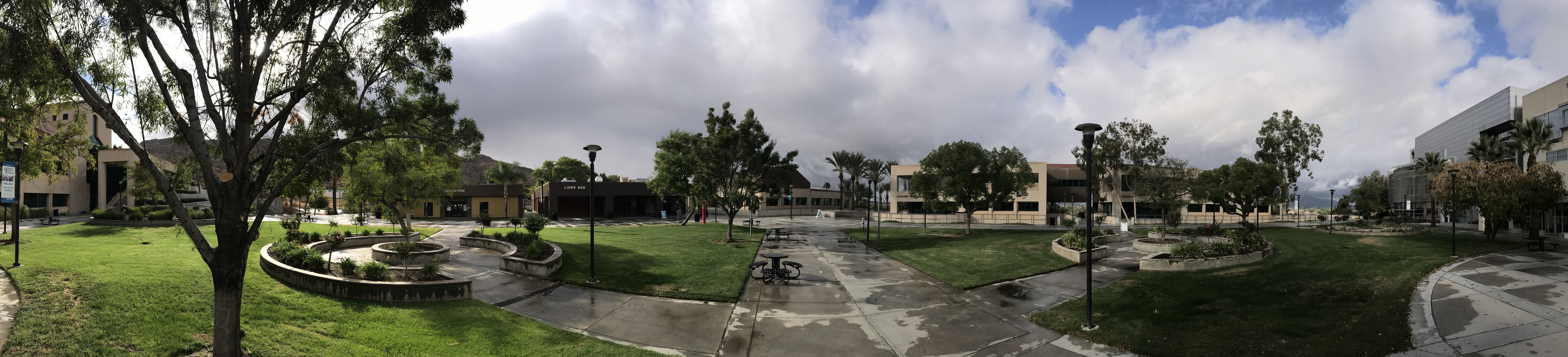
Interior View of the campus from the center quad tree

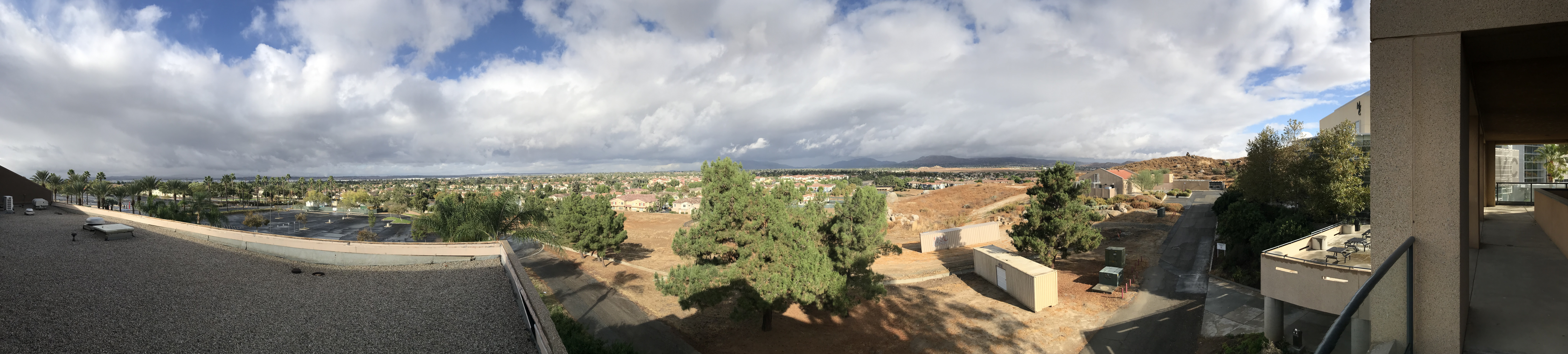
View from the Library Wing, looking West to NE towards the 60 freeway

== History ==
Founded in 1991, Moreno Valley College became a fully accredited community college in 2010 within the Riverside Community College District.

RCCD began serving the Moreno Valley community by offering classes at March Air Force Base and Moreno Valley High School. The number of courses expanded with the community's population and in October 1985 the Robert C. Warmington Company donated 112 acres for the construction of a college in Moreno Valley, later expanded by the purchase of an additional 20 acres in 1989. Construction of the Moreno Valley campus, alongside the Norco College campus, began that same year. In 1991, the Moreno Valley campus officially opened when the first four buildings were completed: the Library, the Student Services Building, the Science and Technology Building, and the student center.

MVC received initial accreditation in 2010 from the Accrediting Commission for Community and Junior Colleges. That same year, the California Community Colleges System's Board of Governors officially recognized MVC as the 111th Community College in the state of California.

MVC is now part of a multi-college district of the Riverside Community College District alongside Riverside City College and Norco College.
