= Village Green Heritage Center =

Park in Palm Springs, California, U.S.

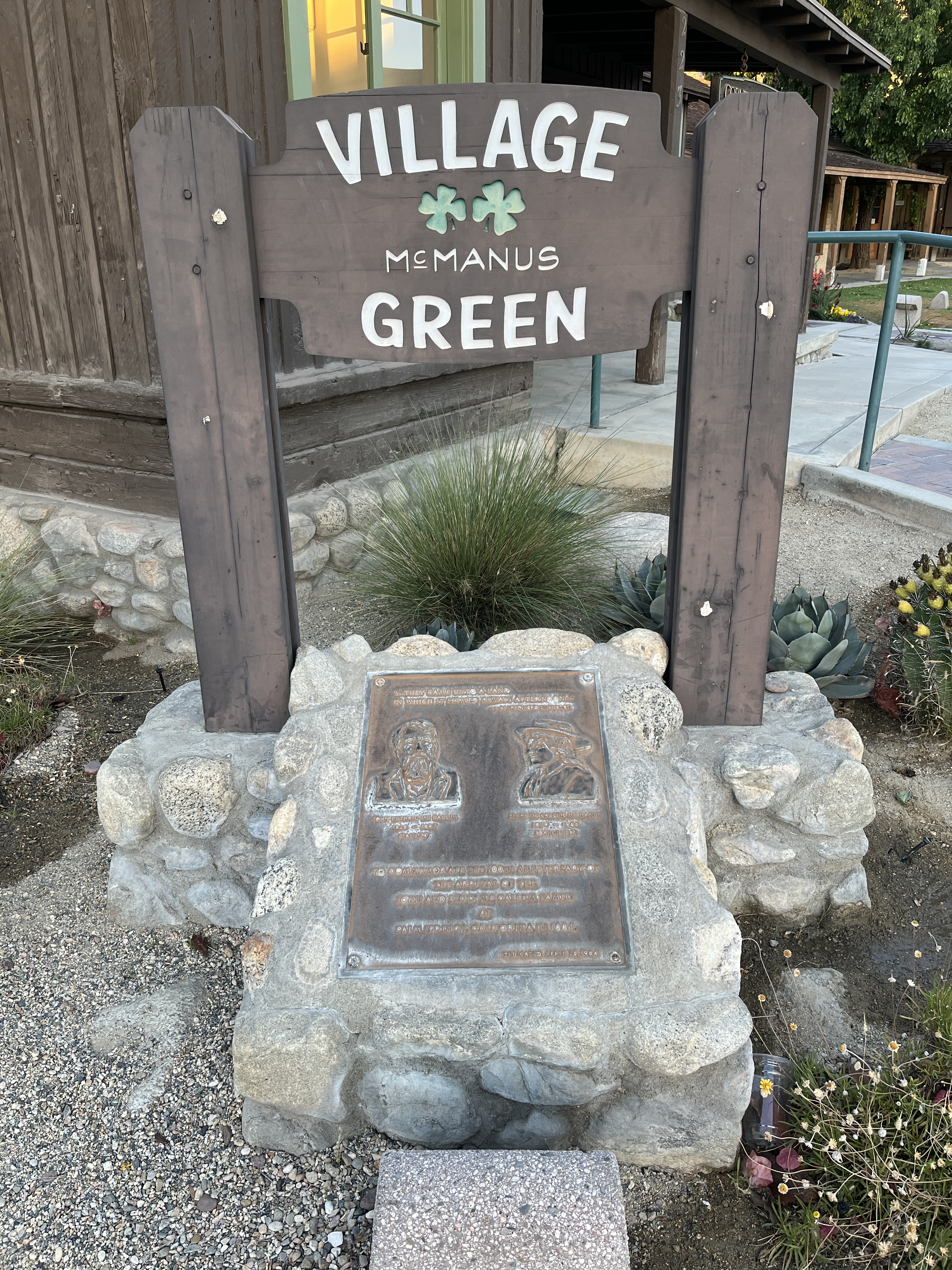
- Park sign, 2024
- Interactive map of Village Green Heritage Center
- Location: Palm Springs, California, U.S.
- Coordinates: 33.8208°N 116.5471°W

The Village Green Heritage Center is a park with multiple historic buildings in Palm Springs, California. Maintained by the Palm Springs Historical Society, the site features the Cornelia White House, McCallum Adobe, Ruddy's General Store, a green space, a fountain, and the bronze sculpture Standing Woman by Felipe Castaneda.

The Palm Springs Walk of Stars also goes through the park.

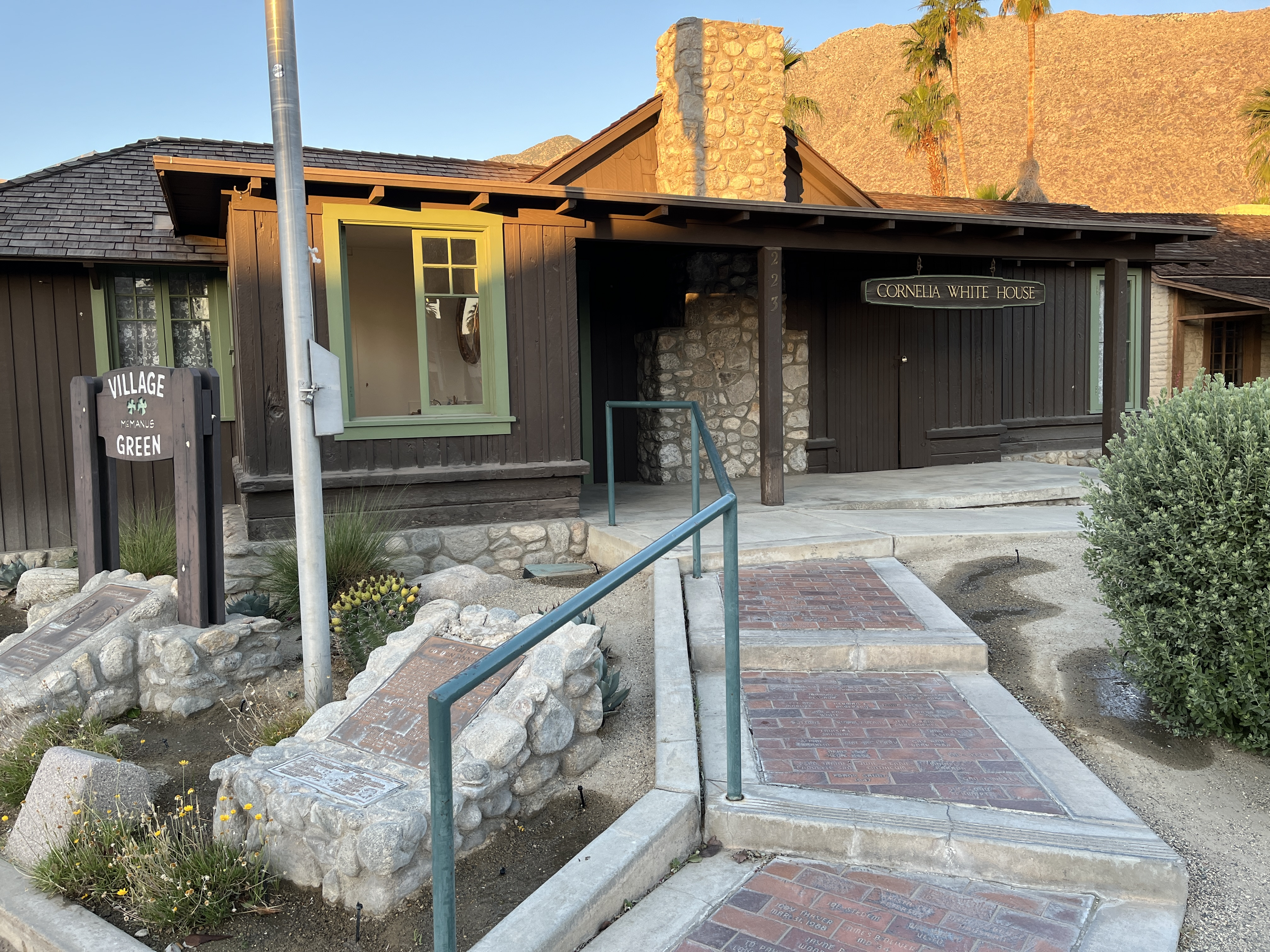
Cornelia White House

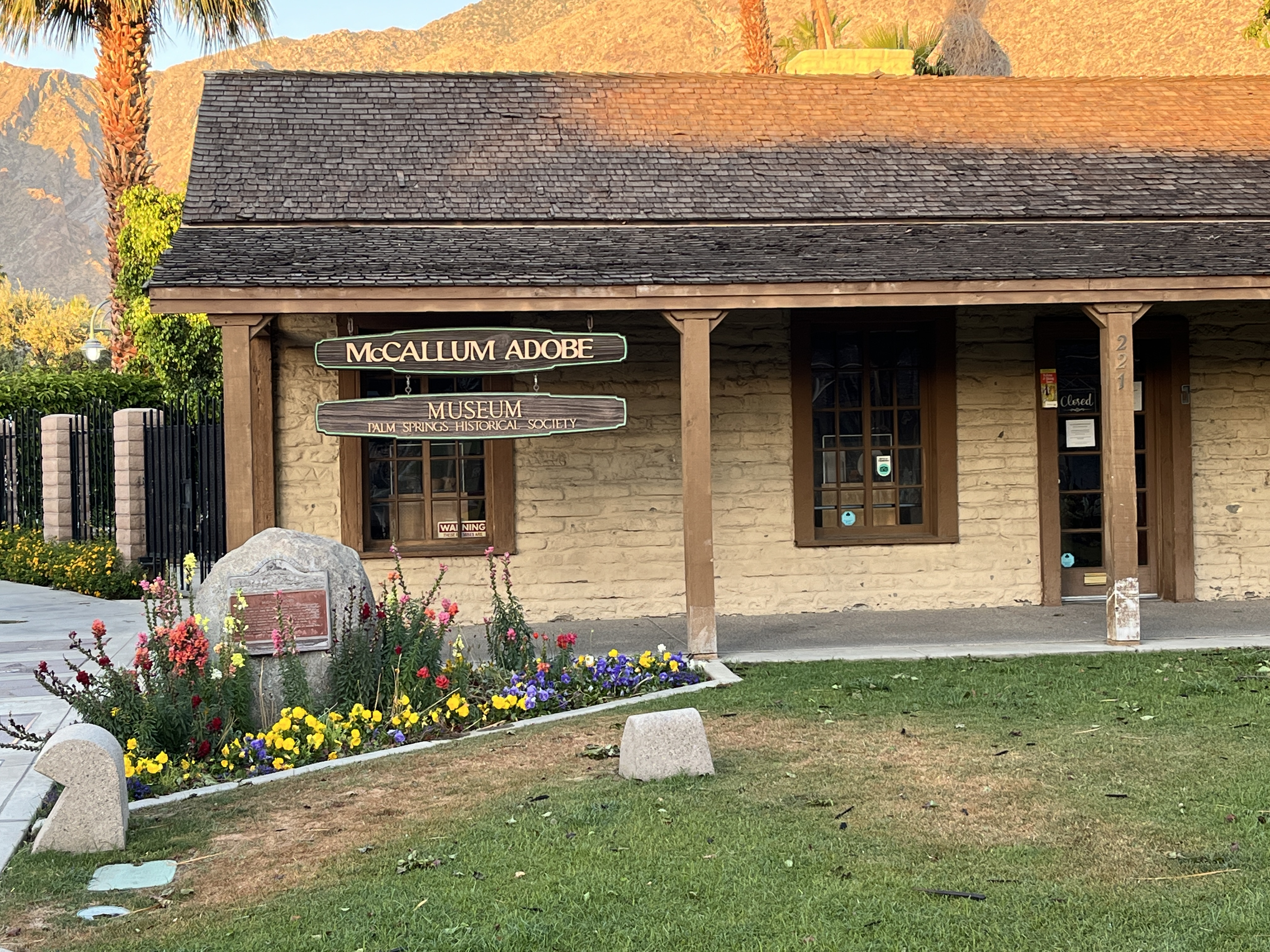
McCallum Adobe

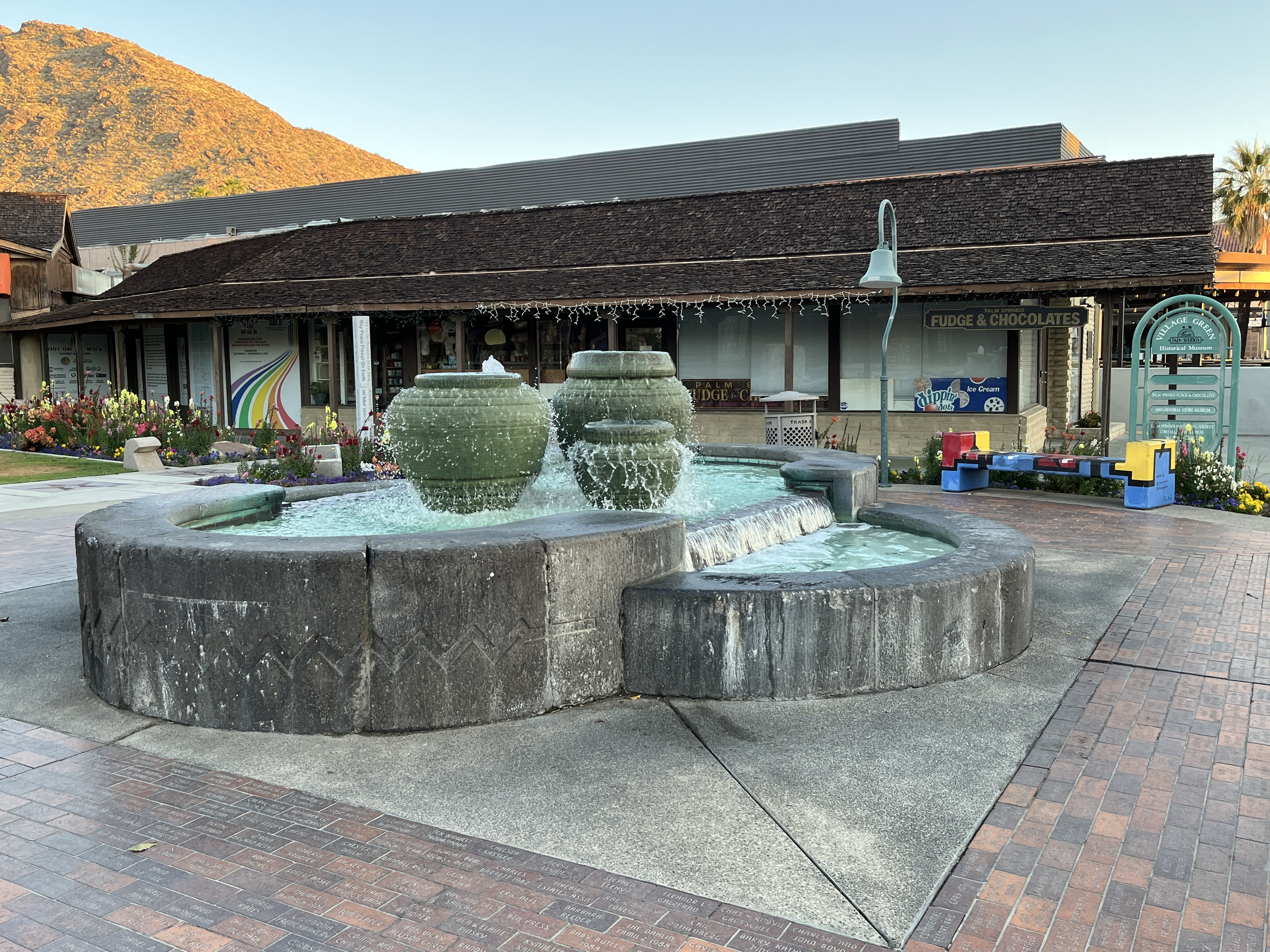
Fountain

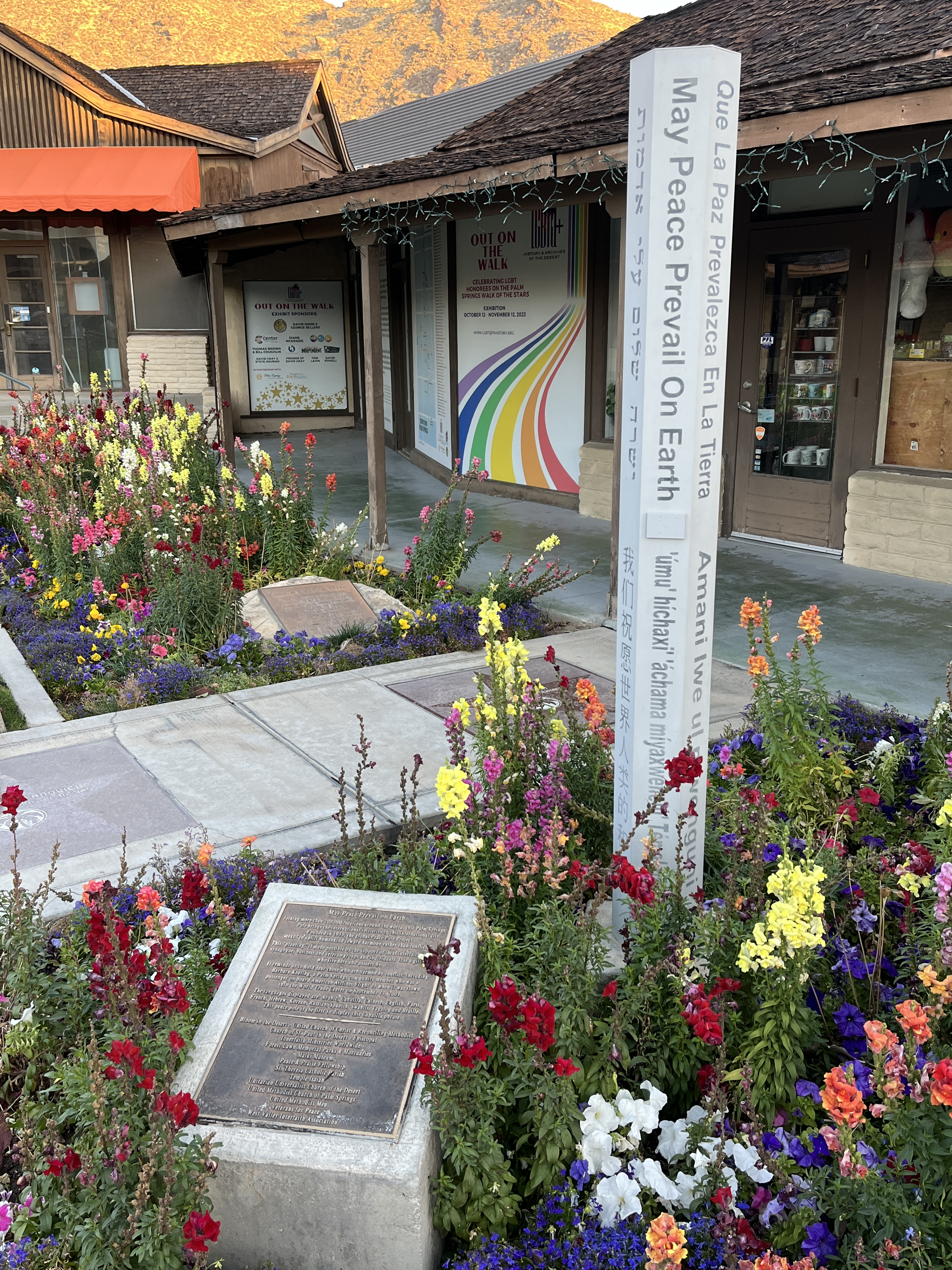
Peace pole
