= Center for Social Justice and Civil Liberties =

- Established: 2012
- Location: Riverside, California
- Coordinates: 33.982105°N 117.376406°W
- Website: https://socialjustice.rccd.edu/

The Center for Social Justice and Civil Liberties is a museum, archive and educational center in Riverside, California, operated by the Riverside Community College District, with a focus on social issues, civil rights, and Inland Empire history.

== History ==
The museum is located in a 1926 building in downtown Riverside, which formerly housed Citrus Belt Savings and Loan. The building was designed by architect Stiles O. Clements in a California Churrigueresque revival style. Riverside Community College District purchased the site in 2005 and initially planned to demolish the building, but upon becoming aware of its architectural significance and condition, the district undertook a $5.5 million restoration project in collaboration with the City of Riverside. The museum opened in June 2012.

== Collections ==
The museum holds a large collection of art and papers of Japanese American artist Miné Okubo, who was raised in Riverside and attended Riverside City College from 1930-1933.
