= Palmdale Railroad =

Former railroad line in Palm Springs, California

The Palmdale Railroad was a 4 ft 8 1/2 in (1,435 mm) standard gauge horse-drawn railroad which existed only briefly in present-day Palm Springs, California, built in 1888.

Originally proposed by Professor Wheaton, a Boston native who relocated to the desert due to asthma, the railroad was part of a larger development which included 160 acres (0.65 km^{2}) of orange groves.

Running primarily down present-day Farrell Drive to the proposed settlement of Palmdale at the foot of Mount San Jacinto near the present-day settlement of Snow Creek (not to be confused with the Antelope Valley city of the same name), the line was abandoned by 1893 due to lack of water. Ties from the right-of-way were used to build the Cornelia White House, which still stands today in downtown Palm Springs.

For years after its abandonment, a single, dilapidated horse-drawn car remained in the desert as a sort of landmark to travelers. The car is no longer visible and is presumed to be buried beneath the sand.

The California Office of Historic Preservation recognized the site of the railroad as a point of interest on November 3, 1969.

== See also ==
- List of railway museums
- List of heritage railways
