= Miné Okubo =

American artist and writer (1912–2001)

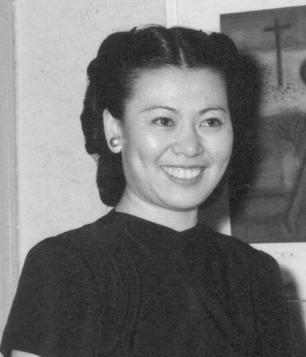
- Okubo in 1945
- Born: Miné Okubo; June 27, 1912; Riverside, California
- Died: February 10, 2001 (aged 88); Greenwich Village, New York
- Education: Master of Fine Arts, University of California at Berkeley (1938); Studied under Fernand Léger in Paris; Diego Rivera in San Francisco
- Known for: Drawing, Painting, Writing
- Notable work: Isseis Lost Everything (painting, 1944); Citizen 13660 (book, 1946, reprinted, 1973, 1983); Mother and Cat (painting, 1941); Numerous works in pen and ink, oil, watercolor, tempera and gouache; Where the Carp Banners Fly (book, 1949, written by Grace W. McGavran, illustrated by Miné Okubo)
- Awards: Bertha Taussig Memorial Traveling Fellowship (1938); American Book Award (1984); Lifetime Achievement Award from the Women's Caucus for Art (1991); Listed in Distinguished Asian Americans

Miné Okubo (/ˈmiːneɪ/;Japanese: 大久保 ミネ, June 27, 1912 – February 10, 2001) was an American artist and writer. She is best known for her book Citizen 13660, a collection of 198 drawings and accompanying text chronicling her experiences in Japanese American internment camps during World War II.

Following the Japanese attack on Pearl Harbor, Okubo and her brother Benji were interned to the Tanforan Assembly Center and then the Topaz War Relocation Center from 1942 to 1944. There she made over 2,000 drawings and sketches of daily life in the camps, many of which were included in her book. After her release Okubo relocated to New York to continue her career as an artist, earning numerous awards and recognitions.

== Early life ==
Born in Riverside, California, Miné Okubo attended Poly High School, Riverside Junior College, (Note: Riverside Junior College later became Riverside Community College. Miné attended the Riverside City campus.) and later received a Master of Fine Arts degree from the University of California at Berkeley, class of 1938. A recipient of the Bertha Taussig Memorial Traveling Fellowship in 1938, Okubo spent two years traveling in France and Italy where she continued her development as an artist. While in Paris, she studied under the famous early 20th-century avant-garde painter Fernand Léger.

From 1939 to 1942, following her return to America from Europe, Okubo created several murals under commission by the Federal Art Project. She was also commissioned by the United States Army to create mosaics and fresco murals. She collaborated with the Mexican muralist Diego Rivera in San Francisco for the Works Progress Administration. Prior to the order for internment, while living in Berkeley, CA, Okubo had been creating mosaics for Fort Ord and the Servicemen's Hospitality House in Oakland, CA. Okubo obtained a special permit, an exemption to the 5-mile travel limit from home, necessary to perform her work in Oakland.

== Internment ==
On April 24, 1942, within five months of the Japanese attack on Pearl Harbor, and two months after Roosevelt's Executive Order 9066, Okubo along with her brother, Toku Okubo, who had been a student at Berkeley, were forcibly relocated to the Japanese American assembly center at Tanforan. Living in a converted horse stall furnished with army cots, they were forced to adjust to the twice-daily roll calls, curfews, and the lack of privacy.

Following six months of confinement at Tanforan, Okubo and her brother were transferred to the Topaz Relocation Center, Utah. Almost never without her sketchpad, Okubo recorded her images of drama, humiliation, and everyday struggle. While interned, Okubo taught art to children and later entered a magazine contest with her drawing of a camp guard. Okubo helped found the literary magazine Trek while at Topaz.

When Fortune magazine learned of her talent, the firm hired her as an illustrator, an arrangement that allowed her to leave the camp after a two-year confinement and relocate to New York. Prior to leaving Topaz for New York City, Okubo shipped a crate of her belongings to Fortune magazine's offices.

== Citizen 13660 ==
After arriving in New York, Okubo published a book about her and her brother's experience as prisoners in the internment camps in California and Utah. The graphic novel, called Citizen 13660, documents the struggles and achievements of the Japanese American and Japanese people imprisoned at the camps. The title comes from the number assigned to her family unit; the book contains almost two hundred of her pen and ink sketches accompanied by explanatory text.

Okubo promoted her graphic novel as "the first and only documentary story of the Japanese evacuation and relocation written and illustrated by one who was there." Citizen 13660 is her only published book as she considered herself a painter and teaching artist. Okubo's simple line drawings and neutral narration provide the reader with a unique perspective on the historical record of the internment.

The book was published in 1946 and has been in print for more than 75 years. It was redesigned and republished with an introduction from Okubo in 2014. The Japanese American National Museum in Los Angeles, California, put on an exhibit celebrating the 75th anniversary publishing of Citizen 13660 in 2021.

== Later life and death ==
Okubo collaborated on the April 1944 special issue of Fortune magazine's article on Japan, a work that included a small number of her drawings — the first time any of her work had been published. She remained in New York, continuing her career as an artist, for the next half-century. She worked as a freelance illustrator and later resumed painting full-time. She continued to paint months before her death.

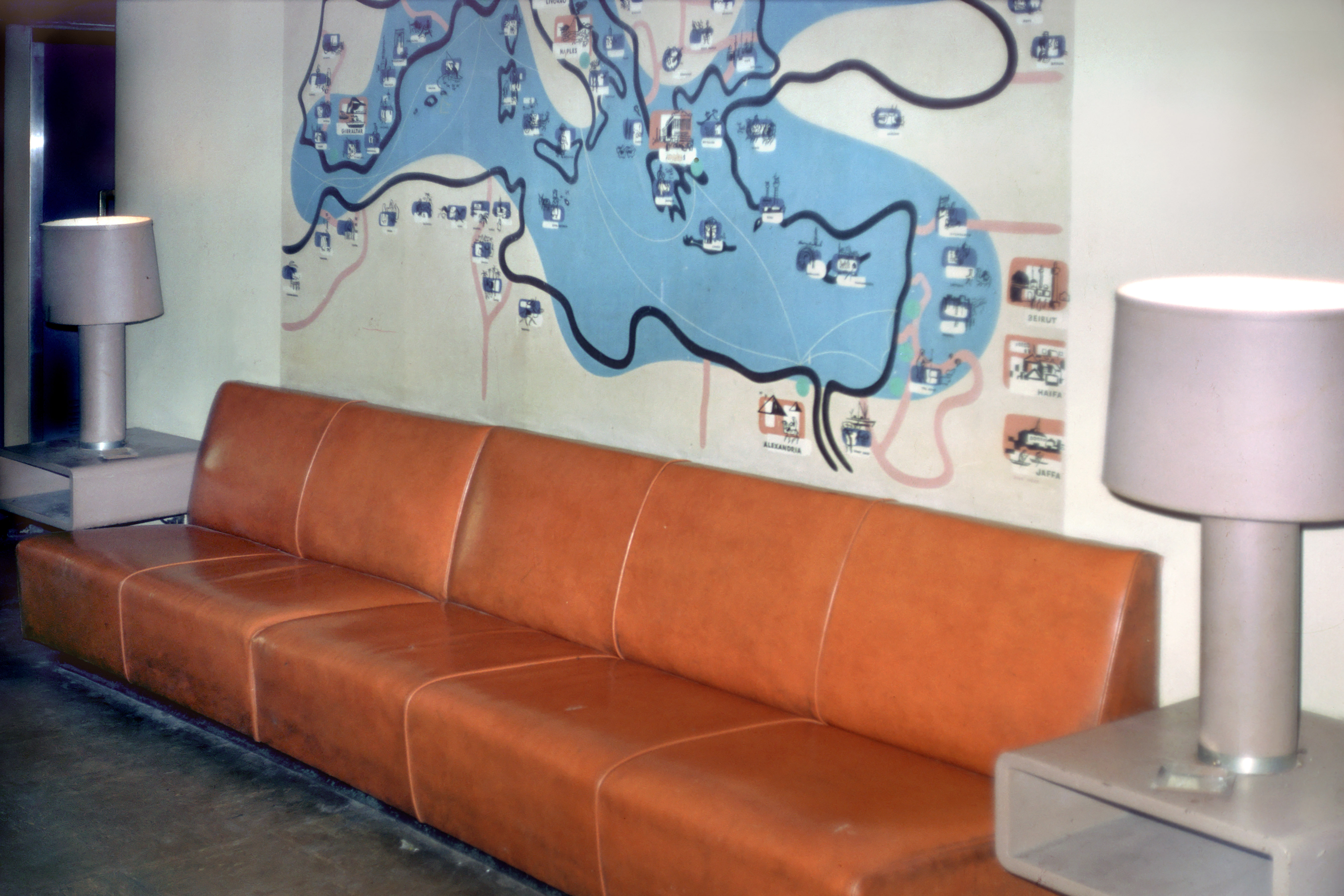
Okubo's Mediterranean map mural in the main foyer of the ex-SS Exochorda, photographed in 1975 when the renamed SS Stevens was serving as a floating dormitory at Stevens Institute of Technology.

Okubo's art is found in solo and group exhibitions at museums including the Metropolitan Museum of Art in New York, and has been shown in many cities. In 1948, designer Henry Dreyfuss commissioned Okubo to create a large Mediterranean map mural for the main foyer of a new fleet of ships called "4 Aces" for American Export Lines, and her work was later pictured in a Fortune magazine article, Modern Art Goes to Sea.

Okubo testified in New York before the Commission on Wartime Relocation and Internment of Civilians following its establishment in 1981. Citizen 13660 — by then widely reviewed and recognized as an important reference book on the internment — was presented to the commission by Okubo.

Her book has been used in courses taught by teachers throughout the country for topics including female artists, artists in war, and artists of color. Becoming nationally recognized, Okubo received numerous awards, among which included the 1984 American Book Award for Citizen 13660. In 1991, the Women's Caucus for Art awarded her a Lifetime Achievement Award, and she is listed in Distinguished Asian Americans: A Biographical Dictionary edited by Hyung-chan Kim. At the time of her death in February 2001, Okubo was living in her canvas-filled apartment near Greenwich Village, Manhattan.

Following her death in 2001, Okubo's various artworks and papers were transferred to Riverside Community College District, a primary beneficiary of the estate, for preservation of the collection. (Note: Seiko Buckingham, Miné's niece and executor for the estate, assisted with the inventory and transfer of items to the college.) The transferred items include approximately 25 banker boxes of reference materials, photographs, slides, books, writings, letters, printed material, and a host of paintings, many unmounted as either loose canvas or rolled.

Okubo became the subject of a play, Miné: A Name For Herself, written by Riverside authors Mary H. Curtin and Theresa Larkin. The play, interwoven with reminiscences about Okubo's later life as a New York artist, portrays her experiences in the camps of Tanforan and Topaz and shares her artwork and aesthetic principles with the audience.

On February 22, 2006, Riverside Community College honored the memory of its noted alumna when it announced that a street on the campus had been renamed Miné Okubo Avenue. (Note: Miné Okubo Avenue, the first street to be renamed by the college, is located on the campus at Riverside City, near the Landis Performing Arts Center. Mary H. Curtin, friend of Okubo and co-author of the play, "Miné: A Name for Herself," had recommended Miné for the renaming.)

As of August 2009, the school was working to catalog, archive, and curate its collection of Okubo's personal writings, sketches, and paintings. The collection has since been completed. It can be viewed at the Center for Social Justice and Civil Liberties in Riverside, California.

In February of 2024, a traveling exhibition produced by the Japanese American National Museum called Pictures of Belonging: Miki Hayakawa, Hisako Hibi, and Miné Okubo featured Okubo's work in a broader American context through the lens of her Japanese American identity. The exhibit was shown at the University of Utah, Utah Museum of Fine Arts (February 24–June 30, 2024) and will travel to the Smithsonian American Art Museum (November 15, 2024–August 17, 2025), the Pennsylvania Academy of the Fine Arts (October 2, 2025–January 4, 2026), Monterey Museum of Art (February 5, 2026–April 19, 2026), and Japanese American National Museum (late 2026). The accompanying catalog, Pictures of Belonging: Miki Hayakawa, Hisako Hibi, and Miné Okubo, edited by ShiPu Wang, was published in December 2023.

== Bibliography ==
- Citizen 13660 – Book cover and content preview at archive.org, where it can also be borrowed and read for free
  - Okubo, Miné (1983). Citizen 13660 (June 1983 ed.). University of Washington Press. pp. 209 (paperback). ISBN 0-295-95989-4.
  - Okubo, Miné (2014). Citizen 13660 (2014 ed.). University of Washington Press. pp. 209 (paperback). ISBN 978-0-295-99392-8.

== Collections ==
Okubo's work is held in the following collections:

- Japanese American National Museum, Los Angeles, California
- Oakland Museum of California, Oakland, California
- Riverside Community College Center for Social Justice and Civil Liberties, Riverside, California
- Smithsonian American Art Museum, Washington, D.C.

== See also ==
- Benji Okubo
- Hisako Hibi
- Chiura Obata

== Sources ==
- Robinson, Greg; Tajima Creef, Elena, eds. (2008-08-01). Miné Okubo: Following Her Own Road. University of Washington Press in Seattle. ISBN 978-0-295-98774-3.
