= Harada House =

Historic house in California, United States

- U.S. National Register of Historic Places
- U.S. National Historic Landmark
- Riverside Landmark
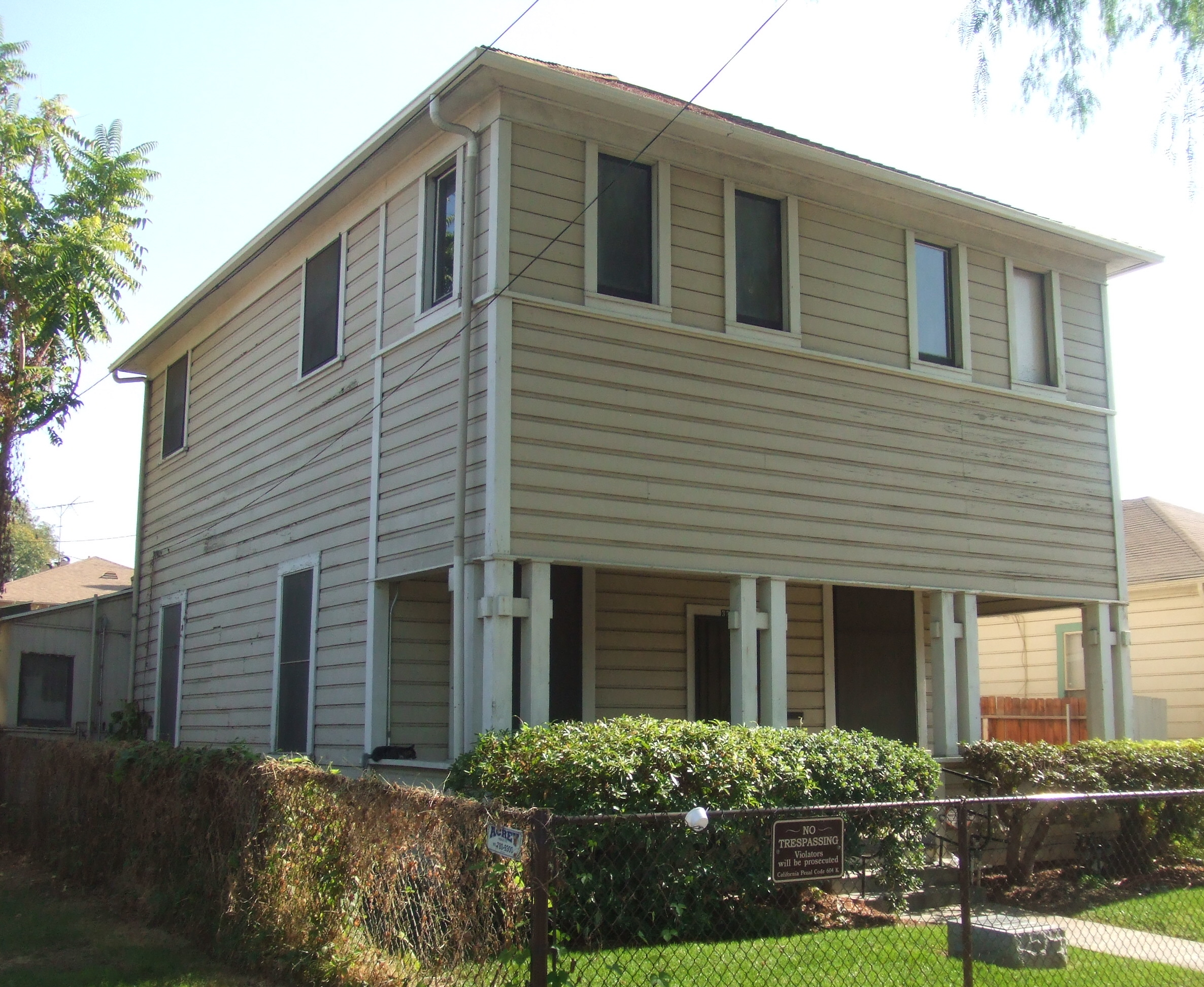
- Harada House

- Location within California Location within the United States
- Location: 3356 Lemon Street, Riverside, California
- Coordinates: 33°59′06″N 117°22′09″W
- Area: less than one acre
- Built: 1884
- Architect: Harp Brothers
- NRHP reference No.: 77000325
- RIVL No.: 23

Significant dates
- Added to NRHP: September 15, 1977
- Designated NHL: December 14, 1990

The Harada House (Japanese: ハラダハウス, Harada Hausu) is a historic house in Riverside, California. The house was the focus of a critical application of the California Alien Land Law of 1913, which prevented foreigners who were ineligible for citizenship from owning property. The state of California attempted to seize the property from the family in California v. Harada, but the Haradas ultimately won the case and retained ownership of the house. The house, created in 1884 and built upon by the Harada family, was declared a National Historic Landmark in 1990 and is currently overseen by the Museum of Riverside.

== Description ==
The Harada House is located near downtown Riverside, on the east side of Lemon Street between 3rd and 4th Streets. The house was built in 1884 as a single-story saltbox cottage with recessed shiplap wood siding and a wood shingle roof. The Haradas made a large improvement to the property in 1916 with the addition of a second story, complete with "four bedrooms, a bathroom, and an open front porch." It now stands as an unassuming, two-story frame structure with shiplap siding on its exterior. It is fronted by a two-story porch supported by heavy posts, with the second floor of the porch being enclosed. The original four square chamfered porch support posts have been exchanged with simple heavy posts and the original windows were redecorated by extending their frames. Due to the alterations of the house being used as evidence in the case of California v. Harada, its historical integrity and a majority of its features such as its wallpaper, fixtures, and overall structural design have been preserved.

== History ==
=== Family ===
During the early 1900s, Jukichi Harada emigrated from his native home of Japan alongside his wife, Ken, and their firstborn son, Masa Atsu. The Harada family settled in Riverside, California by leasing a boarding house as well as operating a restaurant, and they had three more children, Mine, Sumi, and Yoshizo, during this time. In 1913, the Harada family suffered the loss of their five-year-old son, Tadao, due to the bacterial infection diphtheria caused by their current confined living situation. Jukichi Harada then began searching for a new home that was close to the family's church and his children's school.

=== California v. Harada ===
The house was purchased in 1915 by Jukichi Harada in a transaction that formally placed ownership of the house in the hands of his three minor children, who were natural-born United States citizens. This was because Harada and his wife Ken were immigrants from Japan, and were prevented from owning property in California by the California Alien Land Law of 1913. After the purchase, neighboring property owners attempted to drive the Haradas out of the property, without success. State authorities then filed suit against the children (the named owners of the property) to bring it into state ownership in October 1916, and the hearings for the case of California v. Harada began in December 1916.

At issue in the case was the right of the American-born Japanese children of Japanese immigrants to own the house, with the case serving as an early constitutional test of the alien land law. During the hearings, the case drew international attention, as the current relations and Gentlemen's Agreement between the U.S. and Japan put a lot of eyes on the trial. The hearings ended in September 1918, with Judge Hugh Craig upholding the right of the children to own the house. Judge Craig stated that, as American citizens, the Harada children had the right to own property regardless of their race, and the state chose not to appeal this decision.

Despite the Haradas being allowed to keep the property, the principle of legislation preventing land ownership by aliens was also confirmed. This set the stage for further legal challenges, as foreigners ineligible for citizenship were still unable to own property.

=== Preservation ===
During World War II, the Haradas were among those sent to Japanese internment camps, where both Ken and Jukichi Harada died. During their internment, a Caucasian friend of the family occupied the house, and the family was able to retain ownership.

Also during World War II family members Roy Hashimura (adopted) and Harold Harada served with the 442nd Regimental Combat Team. In the years after the war, Sumi Harada, one of the three children, took over the house and boarded other Japanese families who had lost their homes. It is during this period that the upstairs porch was enclosed to provide more living space.

Beginning in the 1970s, Mark Rawitsch, a graduate student from the University of California, begun researching the Harada house. Working alongside Sumi Harada, who was able to preserve a vast quantity of family records, the two were able to demonstrate the house's significance to the City of Riverside, and the house became an official landmark in 1977. In 1991, Sumi Harada received a letter from the National Park Service, “The Harada House has been found to possess national significance in the history of the United States. It has been declared a National Historical Landmark.” In 2004, four years after Sumi Harada died and ownership passed to her brother Harold, their house was donated to the Riverside Metropolitan Museum.

=== Restoration ===
In November 2016, the American Alliance of Museums notified the Riverside Metropolitan Museum in a reaccreditation letter of the need to come together "to see measurable plans and evidence of concrete steps taken to address the urgent need to stabilize, then conserve, then open the Harada House." A comprehensive structural engineering assessment shall be performed to understand the house's full condition. There are more structural issues that have to be dealt with to fully stabilize it, even though the house has had previous structural work. Overall, the Harada House needs dismantling to understand its original structure and condition, then a full plan of procedures to fully restore the house can be developed.

Through the process of restoration, the house is currently being made into a cultural and educational site by the Museum of Riverside (formerly the Riverside Metropolitan Museum). To create an interpretive center for the site, the museum raised money through donations to purchase a neighboring house, referred to as the Robinson House.

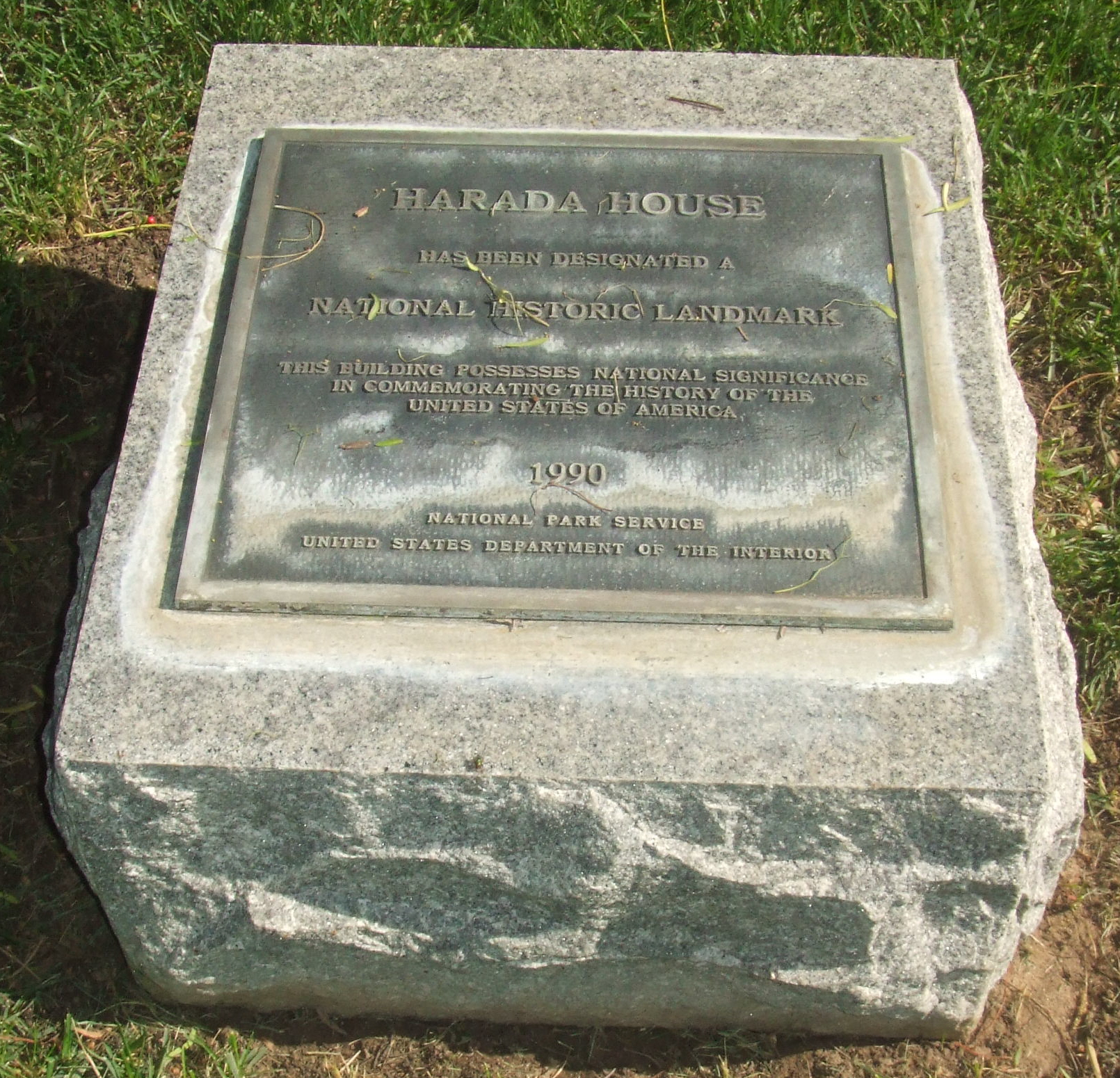
National Historic Landmark plaque in front of the Harada House.

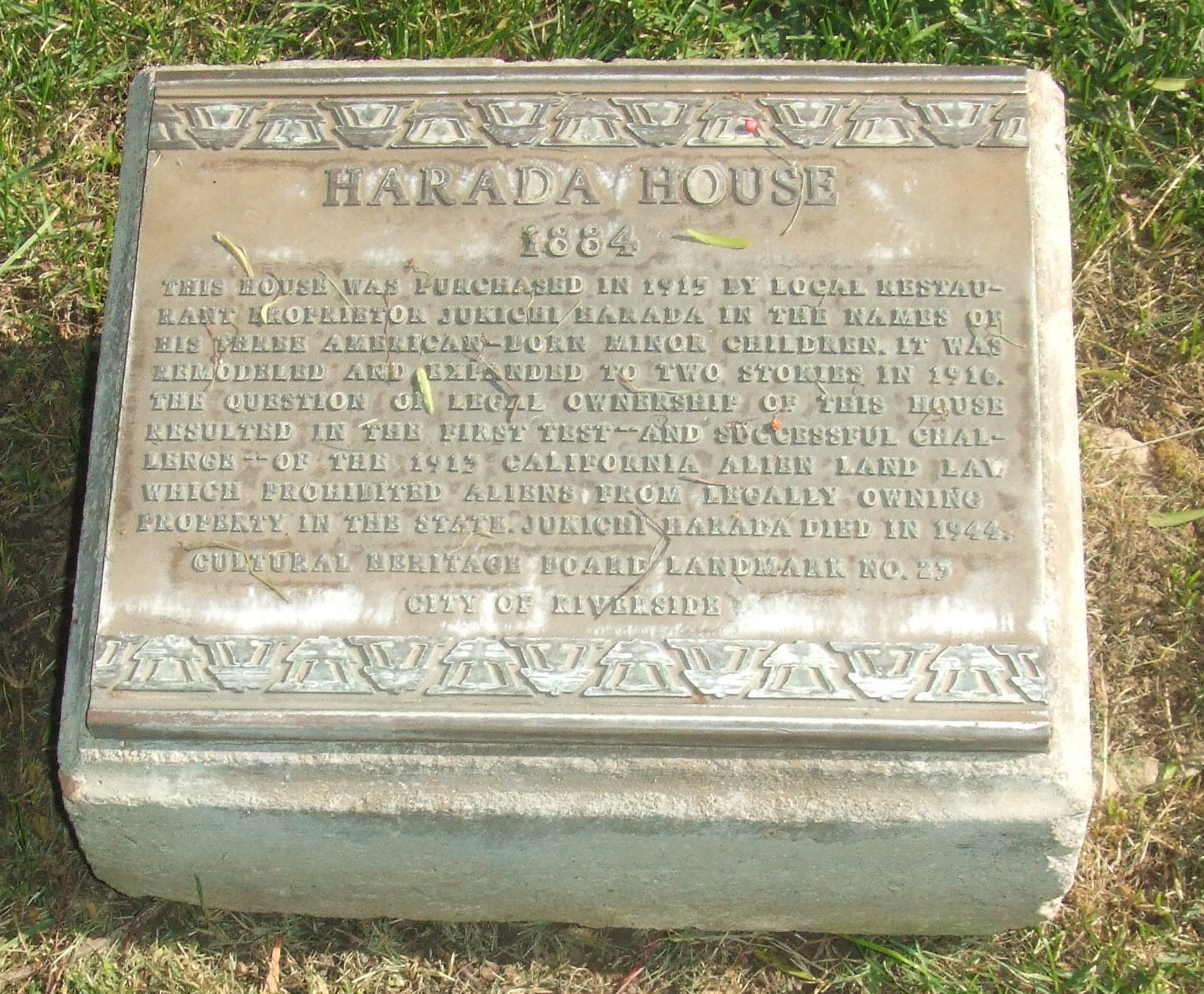
Riverside Cultural Heritage Board plaque in front of the Harada House.

== See also ==
- Bainbridge Island Japanese American Exclusion Memorial
- Day of Remembrance (Japanese Americans)
- Densho: The Japanese American Legacy Project
- Empty Chair Memorial
- Fred Korematsu Day
- Go for Broke Monument
- Japanese American Memorial to Patriotism During World War II
- National Japanese American Veterans Memorial Court
- Sakura Square
- Alien land laws
- List of National Historic Landmarks in California
- National Register of Historic Places listings in Riverside County, California
