= Citizen 13660 =

2014 graphic novel

Citizen 13660 is a book about internment of Japanese Americans written by Miné Okubo. It is a graphic novel completely illustrated by Miné that depicts the life and community within the Japanese internment camps in the United States. Miné was placed in two camps, first Tanforan Assembly Center and then moved to Topaz War Relocation Center. The book was published in 1946 and was a first real look into the camps because cameras were not allowed.

== Background ==
Executive Order 9066 was signed by President Franklin D. Roosevelt on February 19, 1942. It made it legal for the US government to create exclusive internment zones for U.S. citizens of Japanese descent. Before entering World War II, the US government used the term "illegal alien" when referring to US citizens of German, Italian and Japanese descent that were under special supervision because the government identified them as a threat. This grew stronger after the Pearl Harbor attack, and made the internment of Japanese Citizens legal.

== Legacy ==
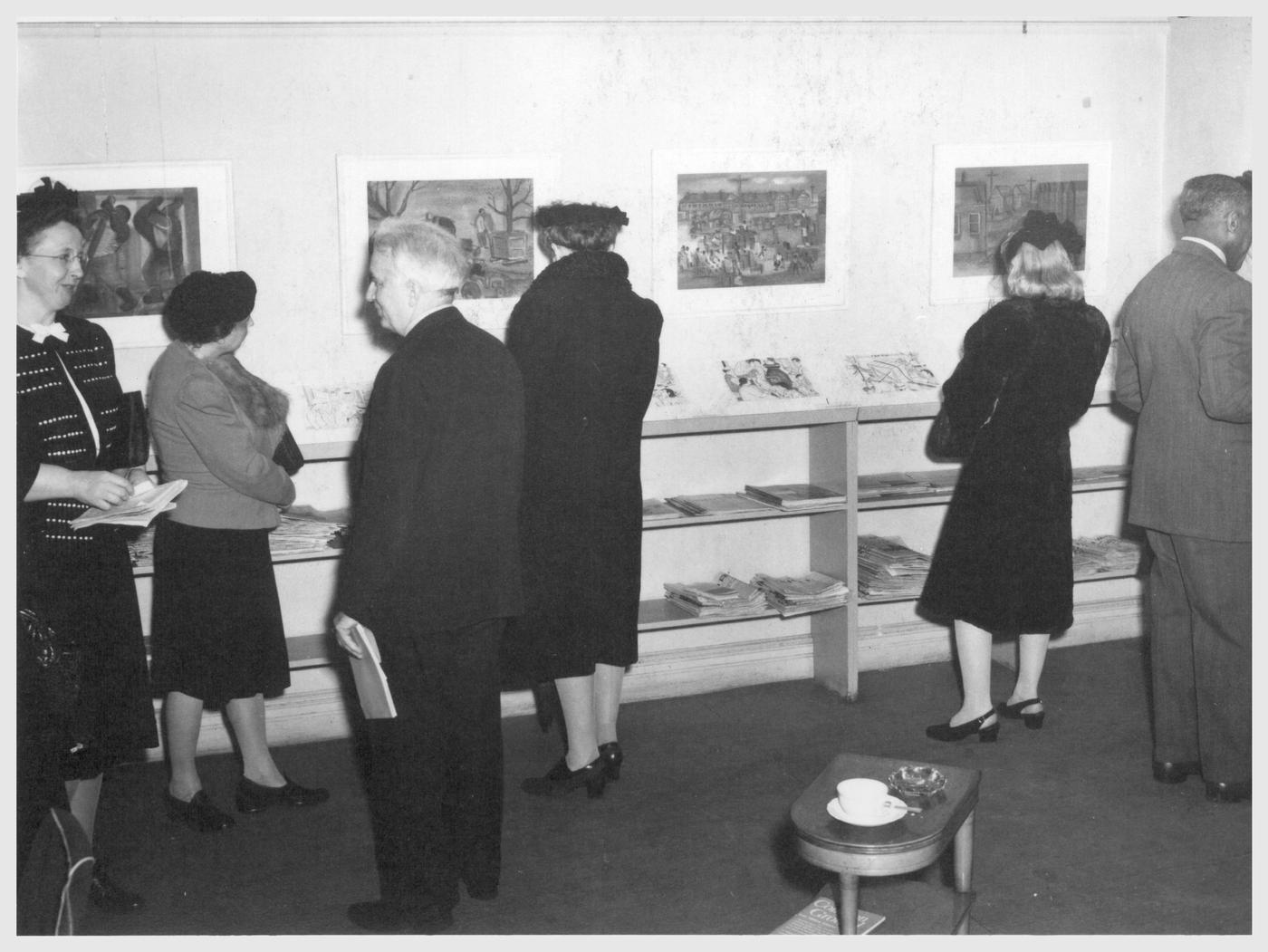
Spectators viewing works by Miné Okubo

Miné Okubo testified about her experience within the camps and showcased her book in 1981. This novel helped the public understand what happened within Japanese Internment and what it was like. Okubo was an artist and this book has been used in education to teach about women studies, art, and historical contexts.

== Summary ==
Citizen 13360 by Miné Okubo is a graphic novel that displays a first hand account of being a prisoner in the Japanese Internment Camps during WW II. The book goes through details of the transportation, daily life, infrastructure and protocols that prisoners had to live with on a daily basis. Okubo is initially sent to the Tanforan Assembly Center in San Bruno, CA. This book shows the devastation of being uprooted from one's home, family and future.
