= Goffs Schoolhouse =

- U.S. National Register of Historic Places
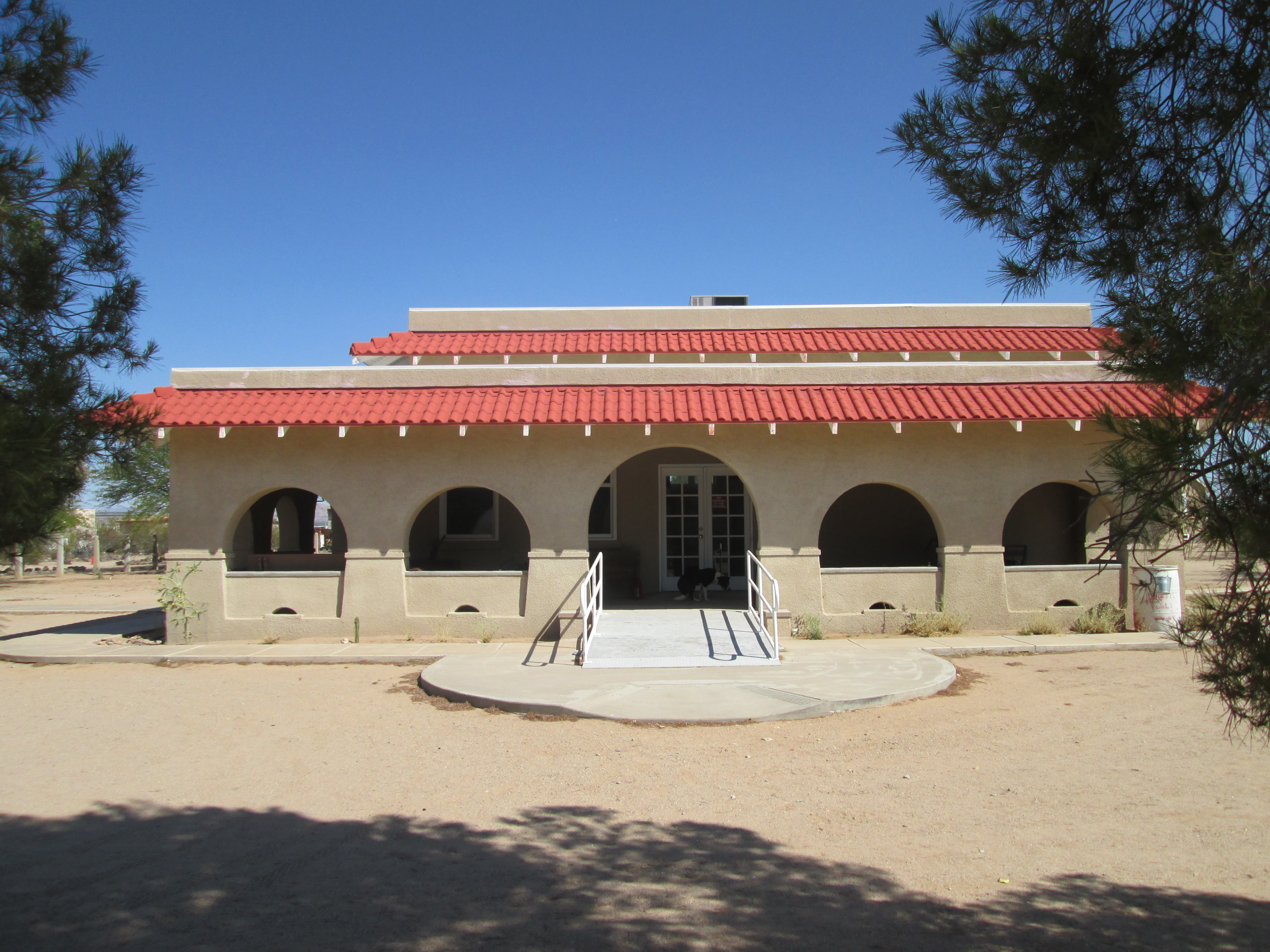

- Location within California Location within the United States
- Location: 37198 Lanfair Rd., Goffs, California
- Coordinates: 34°55′12″N 115°3′18″W
- Area: less than one acre
- Architect: Beimer, Anthony
- Architectural style: Mission Revival
- NRHP reference No.: 01001102
- Added to NRHP: October 11, 2001

The Goffs Schoolhouse is a historic school building located at 37198 Lanfair Road in Goffs, California. Opened in 1914, the one-room schoolhouse was the first in Goffs used solely as a school; prior to its construction, the school district had used a rented building. Architect Anthony Beimer designed the Mission Revival building. The district served students in a 1,000-square-mile (2,600 km^{2}) region surrounding Goffs; its students were the children of the area's miners and railroad workers. Many of the students came from Mexican immigrant families, and bilingual students often served as teacher's assistants to translate for the teacher. Goffs residents also used the school building as a community center, and it housed a branch of the San Bernardino County Library. The school closed in 1937, when the Goffs School District merged with the Needles district. During World War II, the school building served as a canteen for the several Army camps and hospital unit stationed at Goffs (part of the Desert Training Center, the largest Army training facility in the United States). The Mojave Desert Heritage and Cultural Association now uses the building as a museum and cultural center.

The Museum is open Fri, Sat, and Sun from 9a-4p. The museum grounds are open every day, 9a-4p.

The school was added to the National Register of Historic Places on October 11, 2001.
