= Orange Empire Conference =

Orange Empire Conference (OEC) is a community college athletic conference in Orange County, California. Member institutions and the OEC are governed by the California Community College Athletic Association.

== Commissioner ==
- John Keever

== Member institutions ==
- Cypress College
- Fullerton College
- Golden West College
- Irvine Valley College
- Norco College
- Orange Coast College
- Riverside City College
- Saddleback College
- Santa Ana College
- Santiago Canyon College
