= Cornelia White House =

Historic building in Palm Springs, California

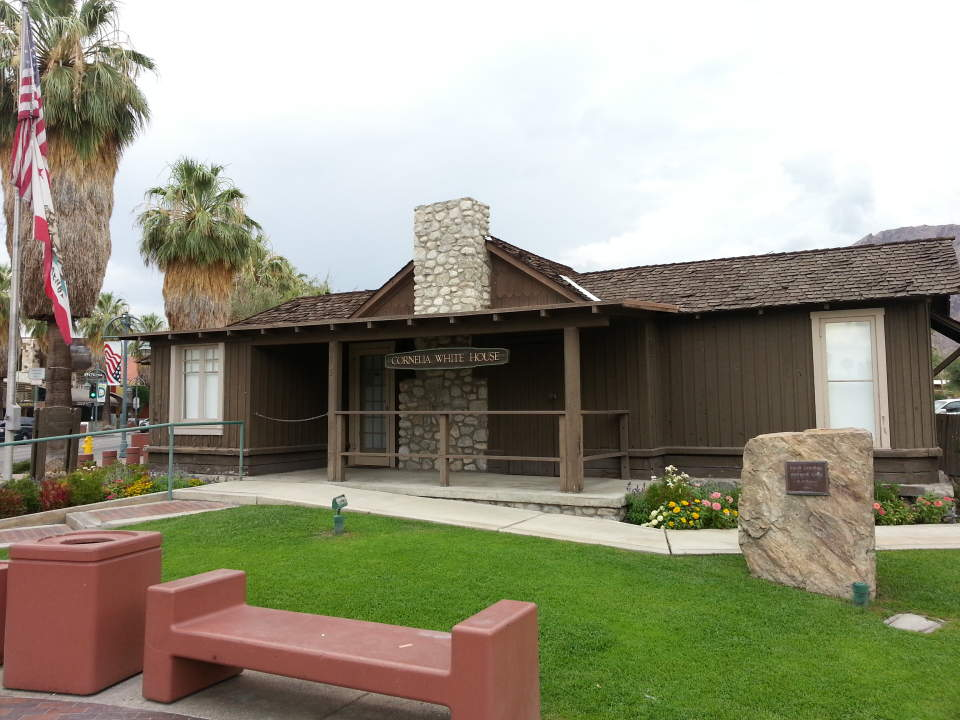
- The house, seen in 2012
- Interactive map of the Cornelia White House area

General information
- Status: Completed
- Location: 221 South Palm Canyon Drive, Palm Springs, CA, United States
- Coordinates: 33.8208°N 116.5470°W
- Construction started: 1893
- Completed: 1893
- Owner: Palm Springs Historical Society

Website
- www.pshistoricalsociety.org/index.html

The Cornelia White House is a historic 1893 wooden residential structure located in downtown Palm Springs, California, and is one of the oldest surviving structures in the town. It is part of the Village Green Heritage Center.

== Cornelia White history ==
The Palmdale Railroad was a horse-drawn narrow gauge short-line railroad in town. It ran along Palm Springs' present-day Farrell Drive to the proposed town site of Palmdale near the foot of Mount San Jacinto. The rail line was short-lived and had been abandoned by 1893 due to lack of water.

The Cornelia White House was built in 1893, and is made entirely of "recycled" railroad ties taken from under the Palmdale Railroad's tracks. The residence is named for its original owner, Cornelia B. White, who was an early pioneer of the Palm Springs area.

== Village Green Heritage Center ==
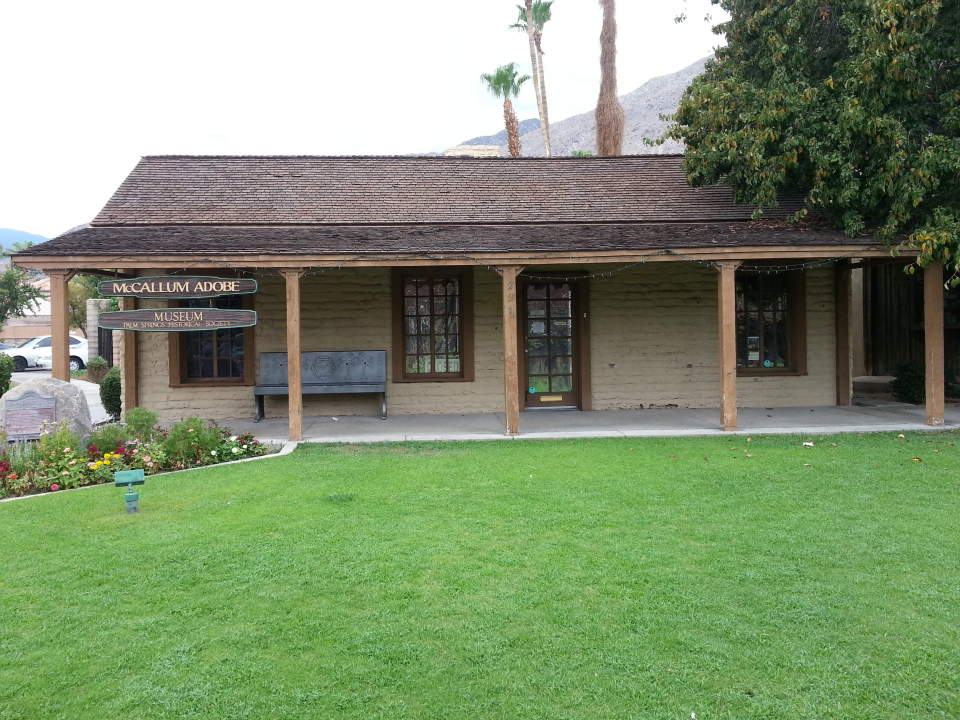
The McCallum Adobe, seen in 2012

The Cornelia White House was built next to the 1884 McCallum Adobe, itself notable as the adobe home of the area's first European American settler, John McCallum, as well as for being the first successful adobe structure in the upper Coachella Valley.

Since 1961 the two structures, today known as the McCallum Adobe-Cornelia White House Museum, are directed by and the property of the Palm Springs Historical Society. The historic houses, with other items of local history such as the earliest telephones in Palm Springs, are on display and open to the public to visit at 221 South Palm Canyon Drive, Palm Springs.

== See also ==
- List of heritage railways
