= International Banana Museum =

Californian museum devoted to bananas

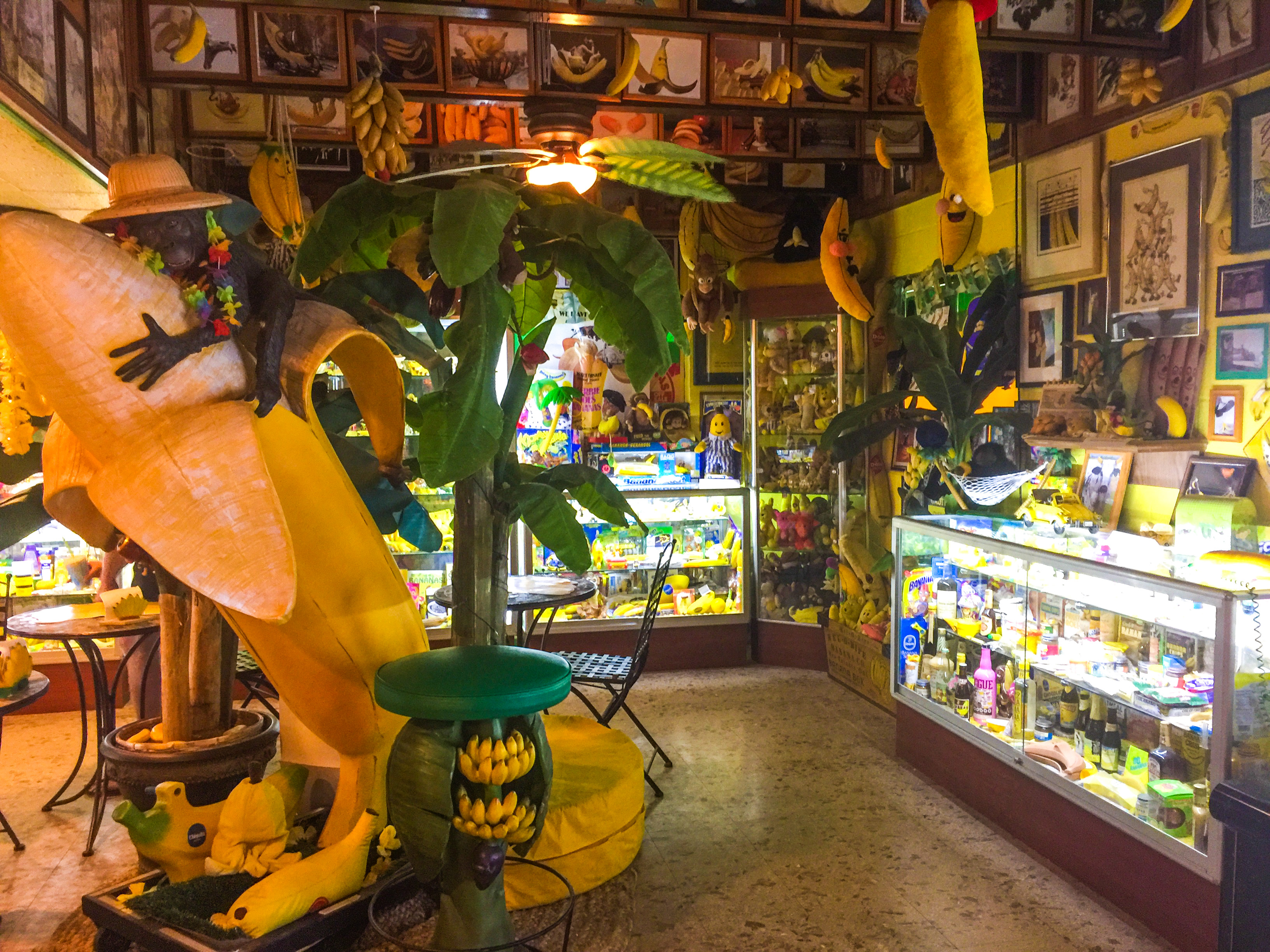
- Museum interior, July 2017
- Established: 1976; 50 years ago
- Location: Mecca, California
- Coordinates: 33°31′42″N 115°56′36″W
- Curator: Fred Garbutt
- Website: internationalbananamuseum.com

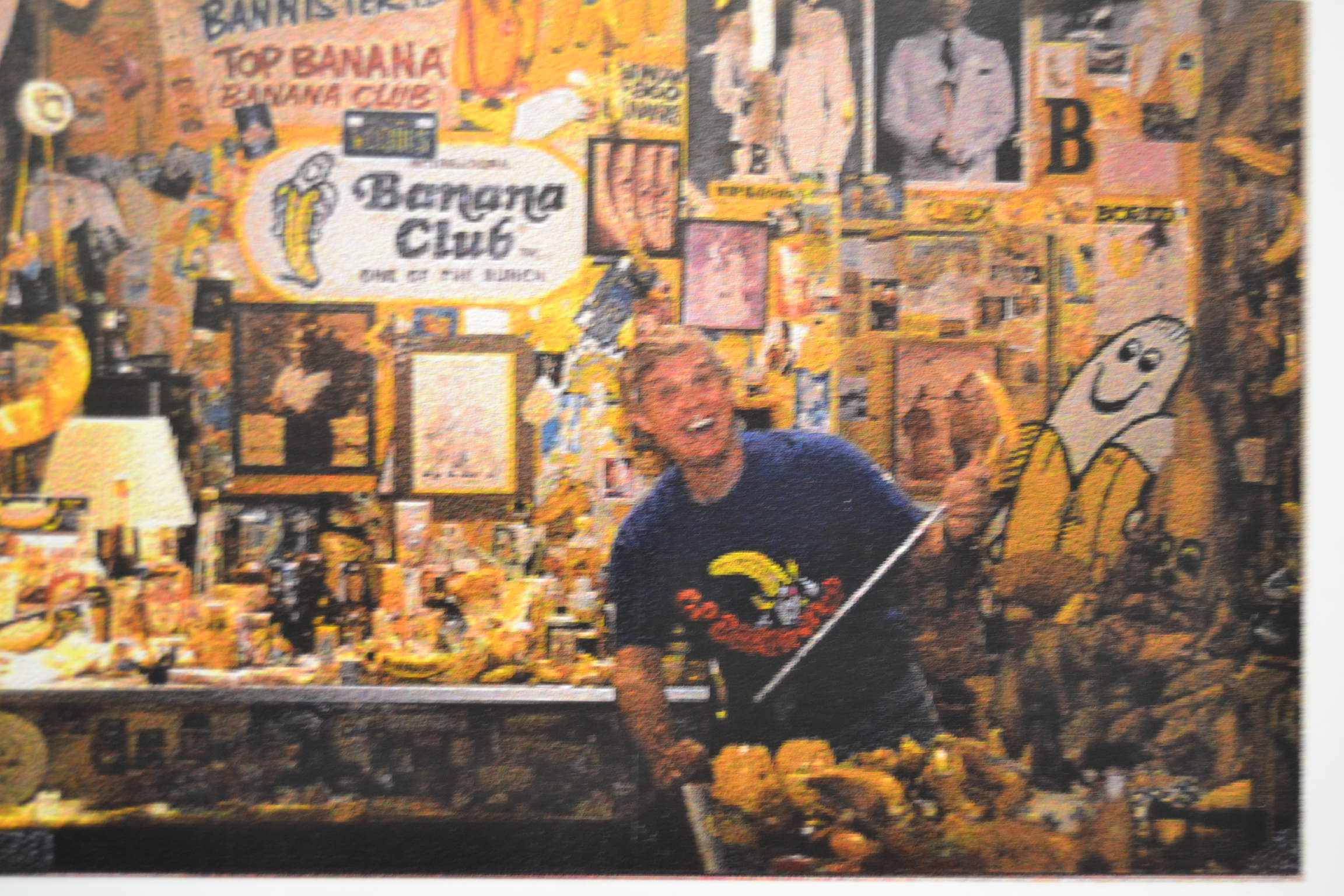
Ken Bannister with his banana collection in 1976

The International Banana Museum was a museum located in Mecca, California, dedicated to the banana. The one-room museum contained more than 20,000 items related to bananas. In 1999, the museum set a Guinness World Record as the largest museum devoted to a single fruit. Due to the COVID-19 pandemic, the museum stated it would close. As of August 2023, it remained closed.

== History ==
In 1972, Kenneth Bannister was a president of a photographic equipment manufacturing company, and at a manufacturers' conference, he handed out thousands of Chiquita banana stickers. His joke was that since the banana was shaped like a smile, it might encourage people to do so.

Encouraged by the positive response, Bannister created the International Banana Club and was designated as the "Top Banana". He started receiving banana-related items in the mail, but began to run out of room for all of them. He founded the museum in 1976.

The International Banana Club and Museum operated in Altadena in a rented building. The Banana Club grew to 35,000 members in 17 countries. Donating a banana-related item to the museum would enable one to join the Banana Club, with a nickname and ability to earn "banana merit points", and obtain a degree in "Bananistry". President Ronald Reagan was a member of the club.

In 2005, Bannister relocated the museum to a rent-free city-owned space in Hesperia. However, in 2010, the Hesperia Recreation and Park District wanted the museum to move out to make room for a new exhibit. Bannister placed the entire collection on eBay for $45,000. He lowered the price to $7,500 and in 2010, Fred Garbutt bought the collection for an undisclosed amount, moving it to Mecca, California, and becoming the new curator. It was reported that Bannister had agreed to a purchase price below $7,500.

== Description ==
In 1999, the museum won a Guinness World Record as the largest museum devoted to a single fruit. At the time, it held a collection of 17,000 items.

The collection included kitschy items such as a "banana couch, banana soda, gold-plated banana, banana boogie board, and banana ears". The museum housed the only petrified banana in the world, which came from the closet of a girl in Kentucky. The museum was family-friendly, despite a history of people sending in lewd objects.

There was also a Banana Bar that served banana-related food and drinks.
