= Heritage House (Riverside, California) =

Historic house in California, United States

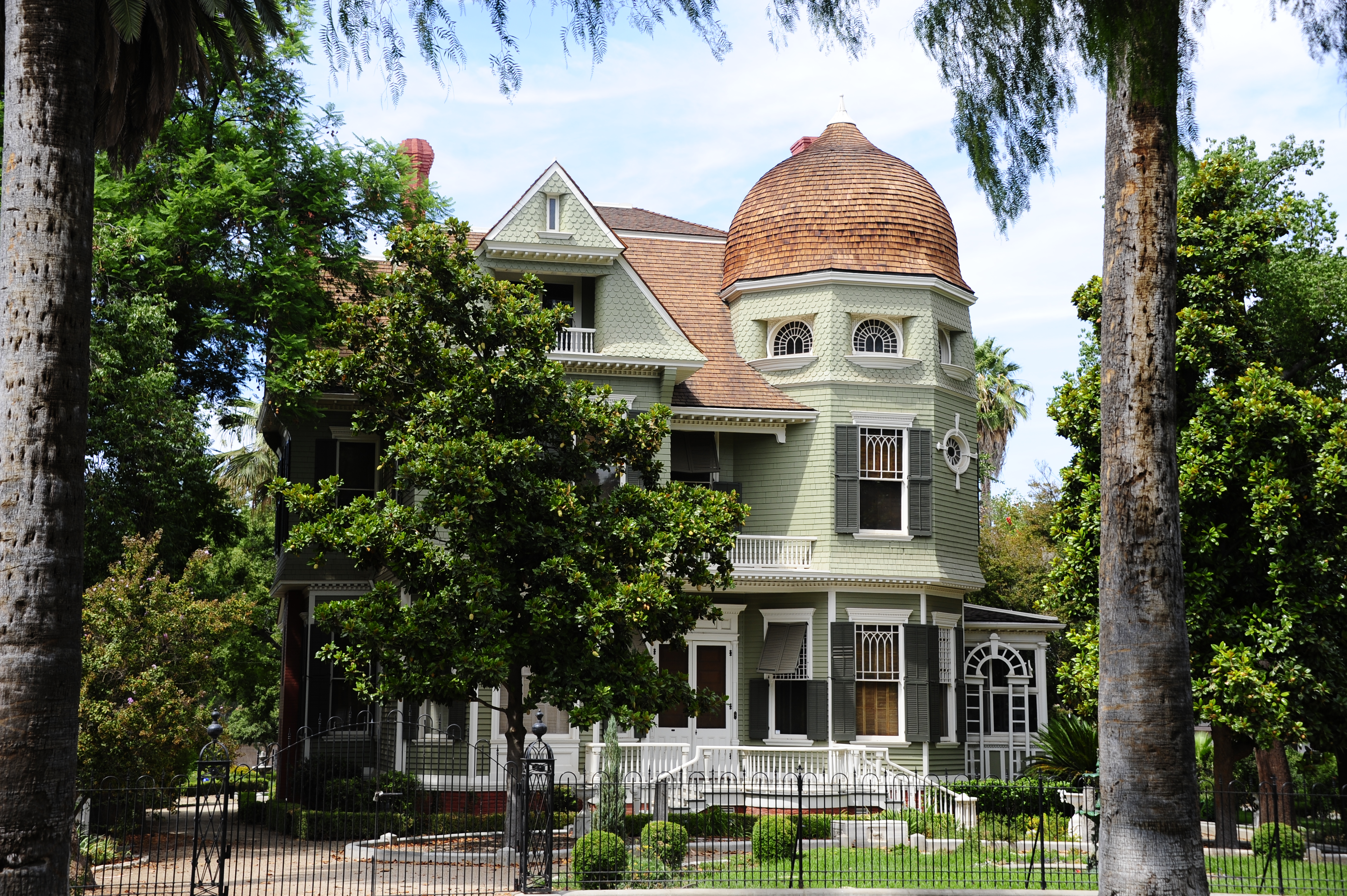
- Heritage House - Riverside, California
- Location: 8193 Magnolia Avenue; Riverside, California 92504
- Coordinates: 33.933951°N 117.422781°W
- Type: Heritage, History
- Website: Heritage House

Heritage House (formerly called the Bettner House or Bettner-McDavid House) is an historic house museum in the Queen Anne Victorian style in Riverside, California. It is part of the Museum of Riverside and was added to the National Register of Historic Places on February 28, 1973.

The house was built in 1891-92 for Mrs. Catherine Bettner, widow of an early citrus pioneer. It was designed by architect John A. Walls of the Los Angeles firm Morgan and Walls. The two-story, 4,000 square foot home resides on Magnolia Avenue, which was a prominent thoroughfare at the time of the house's construction.

Heritage House is restored to reflect the design and lifestyle of wealthy turn-of-the-century Riverside. In addition to its Queen Anne design, it includes Moorish, Georgian and Chinese elements.
