= Riverside Community College District =

- Type: Community College
- Established: 1916
- Chancellor: Wolde-Ab Isaac, Ph.D.
- Location: Riverside, California, United States; 33°59′26″N 117°20′40″W
- Campus: 3 community college campuses, 3 specialize training campuses, 2 annex/learning centers
- Website: www.rccd.edu

The Riverside Community College District, or RCCD, is the community college district serving Riverside, California, United States, and neighboring cities. It is part of the California Community Colleges System. The California Community College system is a part of the state's three-tier public higher education system, which also includes the University of California system and California State University system.

RCCD consists of following:

Three two-year, associate's degree-awarding campuses:

- Riverside City College
- Moreno Valley College
- Norco College

Three specialized training campuses:

- Ben Clark Training Center (Law Enforcement / Fire Safety)
- Riverside County Culinary Academy
- Riverside School for the Arts

Two annex / learning centers:

- Rubidoux Annex
- Innovation Learning Center

One museum:

- Center for Social Justice and Civil Liberties
