= Museum of Riverside =

History and culture, indigenous culture, and natural history in California

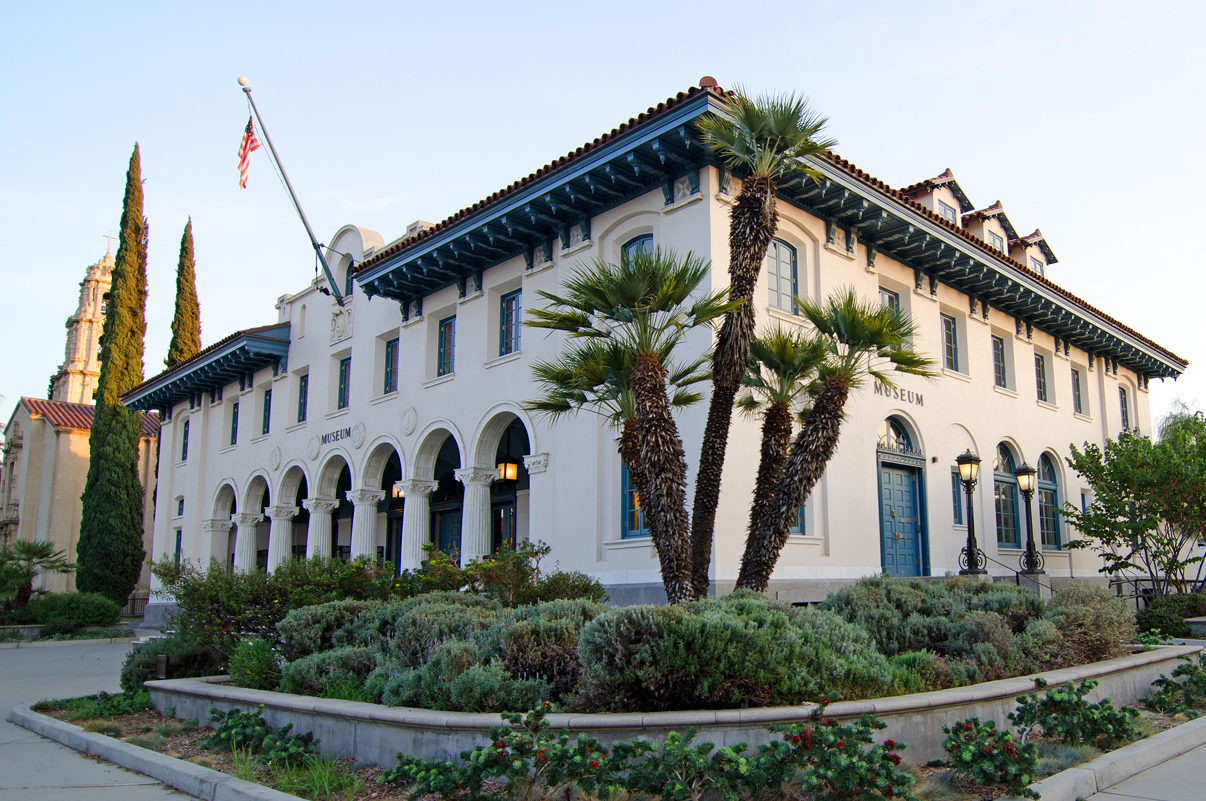
- Built 1912–1914 as the United States Post Office and Federal Building
- Former name: Riverside Metropolitan Museum
- Established: 1924
- Location: Riverside, California
- Coordinates: 33.9820°N 117.3726°W
- Type: History, Indigenous resources, Natural History
- Collection size: 200,000
- Directors: Robyn G. Peterson, Ph.D.
- Curators: Brenda Buller Focht, Ph.D.
- Website: Official website

Riverside Landmark
- Official name: Riverside Municipal Museum
- Reference no.: 11

The Museum of Riverside is a museum of regional history and culture, Indigenous culture, and natural history located in the historic Mission Inn District of Riverside, California, United States. The museum, formerly known as the Riverside Metropolitan Museum and Riverside Municipal Museum, is a department of the City of Riverside, but is supported by the Riverside Museum Associates (RMA) and the Harada House Foundation (HHF), two independent 501(c)(3) nonprofit organizations. Its mission is: "As a center for learning, the Museum of Riverside interacts with the community to collect, preserve, explore, and interpret the cultural and natural history of Riverside and its region."

== History ==
The museum was established on December 12, 1924, when the widow of Cornelius Earle Rumsey donated his collection of Native American artifacts to the City of Riverside. Rumsey, a retired executive of the National Biscuit Company (Nabisco), came to Riverside for his health and subsequently developed an interest in Native American artifacts.

The museum was originally located in the basement of the old City Hall building from 1925 through 1948. It then moved to the basement of the current building, originally a Federal Post Office. For many years, the museum shared its site with the city's police department, the U.S.D.A, and, during World War II, the Fourth Air Force. As the museum's collections and exhibitions grew, it expanded to all of the floors in the 1960s and 1970s. In 1978, its downtown Riverside site earned its place on the National Register of Historic Places.

Over time, the collections grew to an estimated 200,000 artifacts and specimens, including 2,500 linear feet of archives in the disciplines of history, natural history, and Indigenous cultural resources documenting the growth and development of Riverside and the surrounding areas from before its founding as a human settlement until the present. These collections include a notable Native American basketry collection; archival collections documenting the two National Historic Landmarks of Riverside (the Mission Inn and Harada House); the nationally respected Clark Herbarium of mounted botanical specimens; artifacts and equipment that represent Riverside's citrus industry in the nineteenth and twentieth centuries; and archaeological material from Riverside's Chinatown. Collections include additional strengths in geology, entomology, and textiles.

The museum is steward of the National Register Heritage House and the National Historic Landmark Harada House. Heritage House, an 1891 Queen Anne-style Victorian-era home, has served since 1977 as a Victorian house museum representing life in Riverside in the 1890s, the heyday of Riverside's citrus industry. Harada House is among the most significant and powerful civil rights landmarks in California. The site and story of the Harada family embody local, state, national, and international issues of civil and individual rights, democracy, immigration, assimilation, citizenship, and diversity.

After his retirement from teaching at Riverside Junior College, noted naturalist Edmund C. Jaeger served as a curator for the museum and substantially enhanced the botanical collections. Noted anthropologist Christopher Moser also served on staff for many years until 2003.

The museum was among the first museums in the nation to be accredited by the American Alliance of Museums (AAM).

== Architecture ==
The building was designed in the Neo-Classical style of architecture, as it appeared in Southern California with Mission Revival details and a ceramic tile roof evoking Spanish-style architecture.

== Renovations ==
The Riverside Museum in 2026, the midst of its renovation timeline. To the right is the two-story addition.

Construction on renovations began in June of 2025 with a groundbreaking ceremony. The goals of the renovation are to rehabilitate the historic post office building, as well as erect a modern two-story building behind it with a roof terrace and more gallery space. It is slated to reopen in spring of 2028.
