= Riverside City College =

Community college in Riverside, California, US

- Type: Public community college
- Established: 1916
- Chancellor: Wolde-Ab Isaac
- President: Eric Bishop
- Students: 20,604
- Location: Riverside, California, United States; 33°58′19″N 117°22′52″W
- Campus: Urban
- Colors: Orange and black
- Mascot: Tiger
- Website: www.rcc.edu

Riverside City College (RCC) is a public community college in Riverside, California, United States. It is part of the Riverside Community College District, as well as the larger California Community Colleges System.

== History ==
RCC first opened in 1916 at the same site as the Riverside Polytechnic High School (Riverside Poly). Originally known as Riverside Junior College and later as Riverside City College, the school changed its name to Riverside Community College in the mid-1980s. In 2008, the board of trustees renamed the institution back to "Riverside City College".

With the opening of school next fall, Riverside's Junior College will be at the disposal of those who see fit to take advantage of the newest educational facility. The school board realized that the benefits of such a school would be great and according to their March meeting voted to establish such a college.
– Anonymous, excerpt from the high school yearbook, 1919

The junior college expanded from the Riverside Poly campus and in 1924 constructed the first two buildings of the campus quadrangle in 1924. When Riverside Poly re-located to its own campus on Victoria Avenue in 1965 the college assumed total control of the Magnolia property.

Today, Riverside City College is part of the greater Riverside Community College District which enrolls about 21,000 students each semester. Students may earn an associate degree, transfer to a four-year college or university, or earn a career certificate.

In addition to the campus located in downtown Riverside, there are campuses in Moreno Valley and Norco. Separate education centers include the Riverside County Sheriff's Department Ben Clark Public Safety Training Center, the Center for Teaching Excellence at Stokoe, and the Rubidoux Annex in Rubidoux. RCC is also home to Gateway to College, a charter school that serves those returning to high school seeking diplomas as adults.

RCC maintains programs in liberal arts and science, athletics, and performing arts and vocational education. The school band is the RCC Marching Tigers, which includes the Fantasia Winter Guard, which has won several Winter Guard International awards, a Fall Marching Band, a Winter Drum Line, and a Spring Pep Band. The student newspaper is Viewpoints. The college is home to the School for Nursing.

In 2016, RCC opened the Henry W. Coil Sr. and Alice Edna Coil School for the Arts on University Avenue and Market Street, adjacent to the historic White Park. The school is the home of the college's music program, including the internationally renowned RCC Chamber Singers, and the RCC Jazz Ensemble. The school combining classrooms, studios, and digital media labs, built around a state of the art concert hall designed with adjustable acoustics. The new school serves around 1,000 students preparing for careers in vocal or instrumental performance, music education, and careers in the music industry.

The college's marching band performed at the Tournament of Roses Parade in Pasadena, California on January 1, 2010, and at Bandfest at Pasadena City College.

=== 1966 murder ===
On October 30, 1966, Cheri Jo Bates, an 18-year-old student, was murdered on the college premises. She had been repeatedly kicked in the head, stabbed twice in the chest, and slashed to such an extent that she had nearly been decapitated. The murder has been described by many as having "stripped Riverside of its innocence". The culprit was never identified, but is believed by some to have been the Zodiac Killer, a notorious, unidentified serial killer active in the San Francisco Bay Area from 1968 to 1969. The Zodiac himself seemingly admitted to the crime in a 1971 letter, but this theory has been dismissed by the Riverside Police Department.

== Athletics ==
The Riverside City College Tigers compete in the Orange Empire Conference (OEC) and Southern California Football Association, which operates within the California Community College Athletic Association. The college currently fields nine men's teams and nine women's teams.

The athletic facilities include Fran Bushman Tennis Courts, Riverside Aquatics Complex, Samuel C. Evans Complex, Wheelock Gymnasium and Wheelock Stadium.

== Notable alumni ==
- Jeff Bajenaru – professional baseball player
- Chester Carlson – physicist, inventor, and patent attorney
- Jesse Chavez – professional baseball player
- John Gabbert – judge
- Mike Garcia – professional baseball player
- Tommy Hanson – professional baseball player
- Jess Hill – professional baseball player
- J. C. Jackson – professional football player
- Domaine Javier – transgender actress, writer, reality TV personality, registered nurse, and activist
- Sharon Jordan – actress
- Bobby Kielty – professional baseball player
- Noureddine Morceli – Olympic track champion
- Ryan Navarro – professional football player
- Paul Oglesby – professional football player
- Miné Okubo – artist and writer
- Richard S. Prather – mystery novelist under pseudonyms David Knight and Douglas Ring
- AJ Rafael – singer-songwriter
- Jake Retzlaff – college football player
- Bob Rule – professional basketball player
- Will Smith – professional football player
- Chris Stewart – professional baseball player
- Brian Stokes – professional baseball player
- Susan Straight – writer and novelist, professor at the University of California, Riverside
- Charles Tuaau – professional football player
- Ken Woodruff – television writer and producer

== Notable former faculty and coaches ==
- Kurt Barber – professional and college football player and coach
- William Robert "Bob" Boyd – college basketball coach
- Edmund Jaeger – biologist; the Edmund C. Jaeger Desert Institute on the Moreno Valley College campus is named in his honor
- Jess Mortensen – college track athlete and coach
- Bob Schermerhorn – college basketball player and coach
- Jerry Tarkanian – college basketball player and coach
