= Norco College =

Community college in Norco, California

- Motto: Today's Students, Tomorrow's Leaders
- Type: Public community college
- Established: 1991
- Parent institution: Riverside Community College District
- Chancellor: Wolde-Ab Isaac
- President: Monica Green
- Faculty: 100 full-time faculty 250 part-time faculty
- Students: 8846 (Fall 2021)
- Location: Norco, California, United States; 33.913904°N 117.569495°W
- Campus: Urban, 141 acres (57 ha)
- Colors: Burgundy, white
- Mascot: Mustang
- Website: www.norcocollege.edu

Norco College is a public community college in Norco, California. Norco College is part of the Riverside Community College District (RCCD), which is part of the larger California Community Colleges System.

== History ==
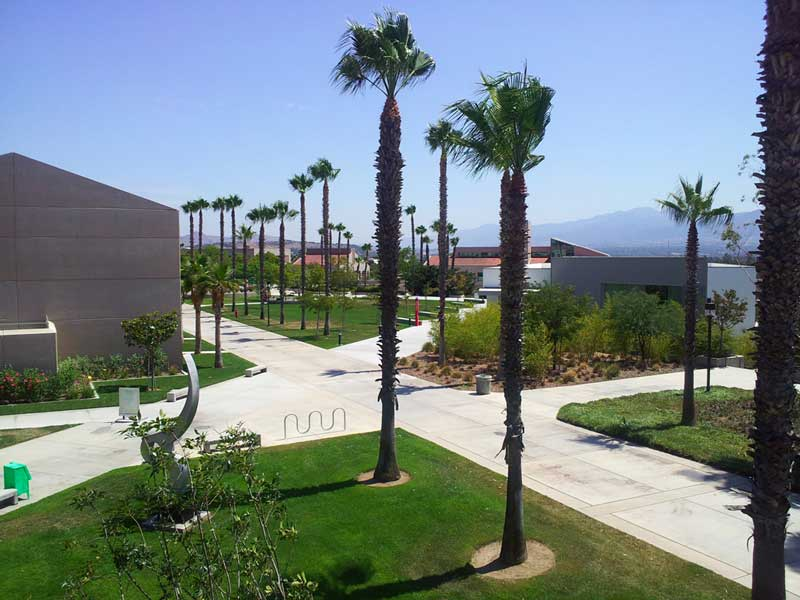
Norco College as seen from the balcony of the Applied Technology Building

Preparation for the establishment of Norco College began in the 1980s, when the Riverside Community College District paid the U.S. government one dollar to acquire a 141-acre (57 ha) parcel of land. (The college is on land once associated with The Hotel Norconian, a luxury resort that was acquired by the United States Navy in December, 1941; it was converted into a military hospital during World War II. Today the original hotel property is listed on the National Register of Historic Places and is currently home to the U.S. Navy's Naval Surface Warfare Center, Corona Division.)

RCCD opened the Norco Campus in April 1991, with an intent to meet the needs of students in the rapidly growing cities of Corona and Norco. The campus enrolled 3,088 students in its first semester—an opening scheduled to coincide with the 75th anniversary of the parent Riverside institution.

In January, 2010, Norco College received full accreditation from Accrediting Commission for Community and Junior Colleges (ACCJC), to become 112th accredited college in the state of California Community College System.

=== 2004 Measure C ===
In March 2004, voters in the Riverside Community College District approved a $350 million bond measure to support the acquisition and modernization of classroom buildings and other facilities on RCCD sites.

A portion of the RCCD Measure C funds were allocated to Norco College, and to date have funded the installation of an artificial turf soccer field and the construction of two new buildings:

- Industrial Technology Building (June 2009)
- Norco College Center for Student Success (October 2010)

=== Title V funding ===
Since 2009, Norco College has been awarded two U.S. Government Title V grants.

In October 2009, Norco College received a $2.8 million five-year grant to enable creation of a Game Art program with tracks for Game Design, Game Programming, and Game Audio. A second component of the grant is the integration of games, simulations, and electronic portfolios into other transfer and career tech programs.

In October, 2011, Norco College was awarded an additional five-year $3.8 million Title V grant to support development of new programs. Norco College is partnering with California State University, San Bernardino (CSUSB), to create complementary academic programs in the fields of in commercial music, new media, game programming, and mobile application development.

== Mascot ==
The mascot of Norco College is the Mustang, an icon which reflects the "Horsetown USA" character of Norco.
