= Betty Spindler =

American ceramist (born c. 1943)

- Born: 1943 (age 82–83); Long Beach, California
- Education: Cerro Coso Community College; University of California, Santa Cruz
- Known for: Ceramic art
- Notable work: Hot Dog

Betty Spindler (born 1943) is an American ceramist, known for her ceramic renditions of fruits, vegetables, and other foods through clay, newspaper, and vibrant colors.

== Life ==
Born in Long Beach, California in 1943, Spindler struggled with learning disabilities as a child, getting diagnosed with dyslexia a few years later. She began her art career with classes at Sherman E. Burroughs High School, but did not immediately continue with her college education. She married and started a family.

== Education ==
Spindler resumed her formal art education in 1979, with classes at Cerro Coso Community College where she began to focus on ceramics. She graduated with an Associate of Arts degree in 1986. She then attended the University of California, Santa Cruz, receiving a Bachelor of Arts degree in 1990 at the age of 47.

== Career ==
While Spindler's ceramics work started as a hobby, she slowly parlayed this into a professional career. Her most prominent work, the 2000 sculpture Hot Dog, is on permanent display in the Smithsonian American Art Museum. Other works of hers are included in the permanent collections of the Crocker Art Museum in Sacramento, California, and the Winfield Gallery in Carmel-by-the-Sea, California.

Spindler has frequently spoken to students on her experiences in overcoming learning disabilities. In 2012, she served as a Distinguished Speaker for her alma mater Cerro Coso Community College's commencement exercises. She has also served as a trustee for Kern Community College District and the California Association of Community Colleges and served on the Governor of California's Commission for Disabled Students.

== Personal life ==
She currently resides in Ridgecrest, California.
