= Sonya Christian =

American mathematician and academic administrator

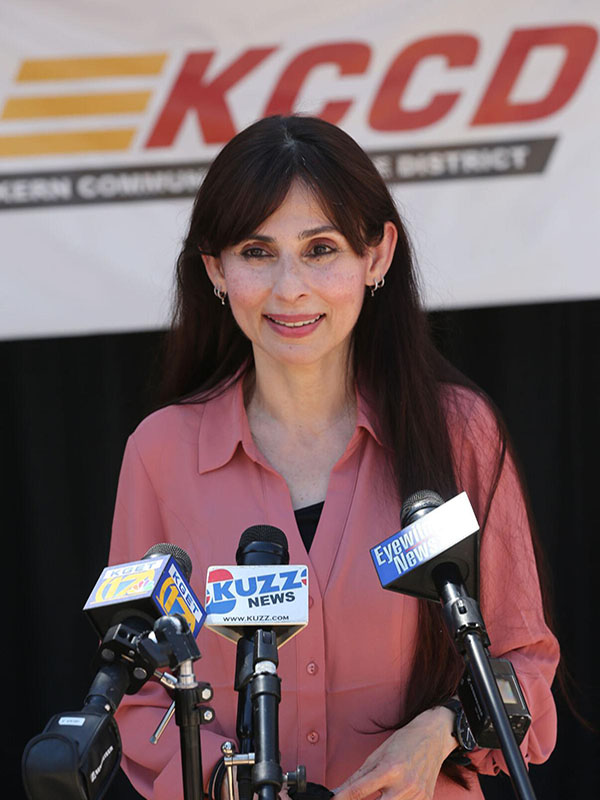

11th Chancellor of the California Community Colleges
- Incumbent
- Assumed office June 1, 2023

Chancellor of the Kern Community College District
- In office July 2021 – May 2023

10th President of Bakersfield College
- In office 2013–2021

Personal details
- Born: Kerala, India
- Education: University of Kerala (BS); University of Southern California (MS); University of California Los Angeles (Ed.D)

Sonya Christian is an Indian-American academic administrator and former professor who is the current 11th Chancellor of the California Community Colleges. She previously served as the 6th Chancellor of the Kern Community College District from 2021–2023 and served as the 10th President of Bakersfield College from 2013–2021.

== Education and career ==
Christian received a bachelor of science degree from the University of Kerala in Kerala, India. She earned her master of science in applied mathematics from the University of Southern California. She earned her EdD from the University of California, Los Angeles.

In 1991, she began her career at Bakersfield College as a mathematics professor. During her 12 years at Bakersfield College, she also served as division chair, then Dean of Science, Engineering, Allied Health, and Mathematics.

In 2003, Christian was named Associate Vice President for Instruction at Lane College in Eugene, Oregon. She later became Vice President of Academic and Student Affairs and Chief Academic Officer.

She returned to Bakersfield College in 2013 after being named Bakersfield College's 10th president. During her tenure, she focused her work on student success with equity. In 2015, those efforts were rewarded when Bakersfield College's "Making it Happen" program was named a 2015 Exemplary Program by the Board of Governors of California Community Colleges. The California Community Colleges honored Bakersfield College with the 2018 Chancellor's Student Success Award for its work with High-Touch, High-Tech Transfer Pathways. That program was also honored in 2019, when Bakersfield College was named a 2019 Innovation of the Year Award winner. Also in 2019, Bakersfield College was named as a recipient of the Council for Higher Education Accreditation International Quality Group's CIQG Quality Award for the college's work in improving student outcomes.

Christian also served as Chair of the Accrediting Commission for Community and Junior Colleges (2020-2022). She was appointed by the Governor to the Student Centered Funding Formula Oversight Committee, where she served from 2018-2022. She currently serves on the boards for the Campaign for College Opportunity and Equity in Policy Implementation Board, and is the Chair of the California Community College's Women's Caucus.

On April 19, 2021, the Kern Community College District Board of Trustees announced that Christian would become the district's 10th chancellor, beginning her term in July 2021.

== Awards and accolades ==
Christian received the District 6 Pacesetter of the Year Award from the National Council for Marketing & Public Relations.

Assemblyman Rudy Salas nominated Christian as 2016 Woman of the Year for CA-32.

In 2018, the Delano Chamber of Commerce selected Christian as co-recipient of the annual Educational Award, which she shared with Assemblymember Rudy Salas.

In 2019, Christian was named Woman of the Year by the Kern County Hispanic Chamber of Commerce.
