= Liz Gorman =

Liz Gorman may refer to:

- Elizabeth Ann Doody Gorman (born 1965), member of the Cook County Board of Commissioners
- Liz Gorman (American football) (born 1987), American football player
