= Cerro Coso Community College =

Public college in Ridgecrest, California

Coordinates: 35°34′03″N 117°40′03″W

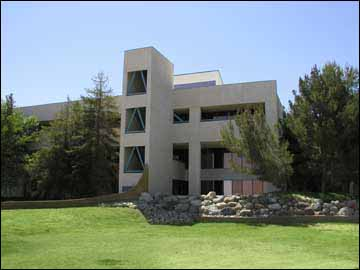
- Type: Public community college
- Established: 1973
- Affiliations: Kern Community College District
- Chancellor: Dr. Sean Hancock (interim)
- President: Dr. Corey Marvin (interim)
- Administrative staff: 200+
- Students: 4,653
- Location: Ridgecrest, California, United States
- Campus: 18,000 square miles (47,000 km^{2})
- Mascot: Coyote
- Website: www.cerrocoso.edu

Cerro Coso Community College is a public community college in the Eastern Sierra region of Southern California. It was established in 1973 as a separate college within the Kern Community College District. The college offers traditional and online courses and two-year degrees. The college serves an area of approximately 18,000-square-miles. Cerro Coso has five instructional sites: Eastern Sierra Center Bishop and Mammoth Lakes, Indian Wells Valley, Kern River Valley, and South Kern. The college also has an Incarcerated Student Education Program in two locations, the California City Correctional Facility and Tehachapi California Correctional Institution.

== Campuses ==
=== Indian Wells Valley Campus ===
The 420-acre (1.7 km^{2}) Indian Wells Valley Campus (IWV) is in the upper Mojave Desert near Ridgecrest, California, 160 miles (260 km) northeast of Los Angeles. It is the largest of the Cerro Coso campuses and enrolls about 28,000 students. It serves the communities of Ridgecrest, China Lake, Inyokern, and Trona. This center provides educational services to military and civilian personnel on the base.

=== Kern River Valley Campus ===
The 150-acre (61 ha) Kern River Valley Campus is located in the Kern River Valley, within the town of Lake Isabella, California.

The Kern River Valley Campus serves the communities of Lake Isabella, Kernville, Wofford Heights, and Weldon. It serves a population of about 5,000.

=== East Kern Campus ===
The 50-acre (20 ha) East Kern Campus is located at Edwards Air Force Base and enrolls about 1,000 students. It serves the communities of Edwards Air Force Base, Mojave, Boron, and California City as well as locations in San Bernardino and Kern counties.

=== Eastern Sierra Campus ===
The Eastern Sierra Campus serves Bishop, Mammoth Lakes, Big Pine, Lone Pine, Independence, Death Valley.

=== Mammoth Campus ===
The Mammoth Campus offers on-campus housing at South Gateway Student Apartments, owned and operated by Mammoth Lakes Foundation.

== Student Life ==
Student demographics as of Fall 2023
Race and ethnicity	Total
Hispanic	46%
White	36%
African American	6%
Multiracial	5%
Asian	3%
Filipino	2%
American Indian/Alaska Native	1%
