= UC Berkeley School of Education =

School at the University of California, Berkeley

University of California, Berkeley School of Education
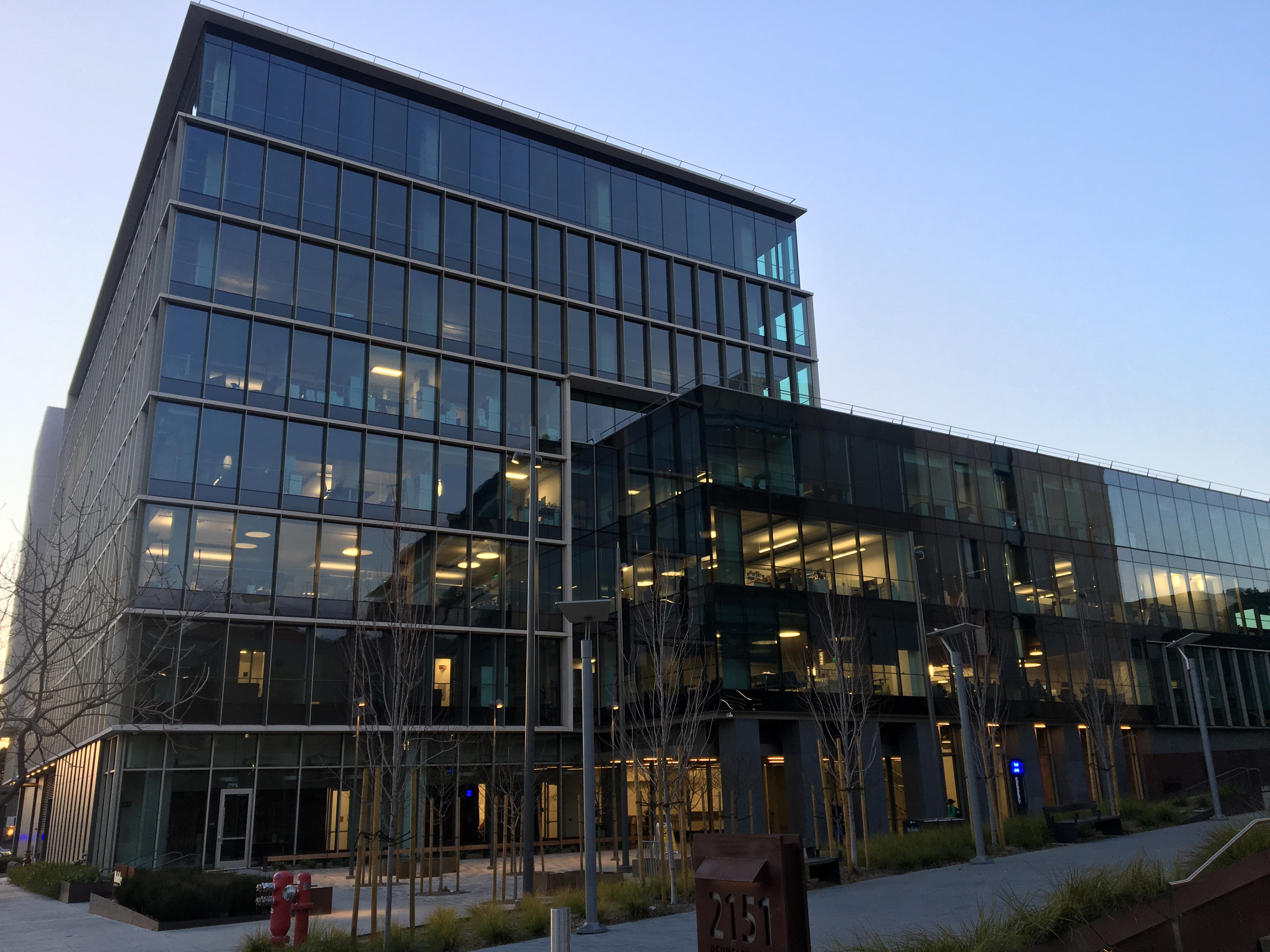
- Berkeley Way West, home of the Berkeley School of Education
- Type: Public
- Established: 1913
- Dean: Michelle Young
- Students: 291 full-time
- Location: Berkeley, California, U.S. 37°52′25.12″N 122°16′4.61″W
- Campus: Urban
- Website: bse.berkeley.edu

The University of California, Berkeley School of Education, or the Berkeley School of Education (BSE), is one of fifteen schools and colleges at the University of California, Berkeley, a public research university in Berkeley, California. The BSE specializes in teacher training and education research.

Prior to its name change in June 2022, the school was known as the Graduate School of Education (GSE).

== Location ==
The School of Education is located in Berkeley Way West in Downtown Berkeley, after previously occupying the east wing of Tolman Hall, located in the northwest area of the UC Berkeley campus. Tolman Hall was deemed seismically unfit and is slated for demolition. The School of Education shares the Berkeley Way West building with the UC Berkeley School of Public Health and the Department of Psychology.

== History ==
Tolman Hall, longtime and former home of UC Berkeley School of Education.

The school traces its roots back to 1889, when the Regents of the University of California announced "the intention... to establish a course of instruction in the science and art of teaching." The B.A. in Education was first offered by the College of Letters and Science in 1892, followed by the establishment of the Department of Education (which would be included as a unit of the Graduate Division) in 1900. In 1913, the UC Board of Regents formally established the Graduate School of Education, with educator Alexis F. Lange presiding as the school's first dean.

Over the next few decades, Doctoral, Master's, and Credential programs were developed, along with other notable research initiatives, programs, fellowships, and institutes. Among these programs and institutes was the National Writing Project (NWP), which was founded in 1974 as the Bay Area Writing Project (BAWP).

On June 23, 2022, the Graduate School of Education was renamed the Berkeley School of Education to more "accurately [reflect its] mission of equity-focused education at all levels."

== Programs ==
The school has Master's Degree and Ph.D. programs which are contained within three Areas of Study (with the exception of LEEP, which is a schoolwide program) and grouped by Degree and Credential objectives. All four Credential programs include an M.A. degree. All graduate programs stress the integration of theory with practical application. Researchers and classroom professionals work together to develop solutions to the grand challenges in education that require collaborative efforts across disciplines.

=== Other programs and academic units ===
- Leaders for Equity and Democracy (LEAD)
- The Graduate Group in Science and Mathematics Education (SESAME)
- Undergraduate Minor in Education
- Undergraduate Minor in Interdisciplinary Studies in Early Childhood
- UC Berkeley Summer Session
- Academic Talent Development Program (ATDP)
- College and Career Academy Support Network (CCASN)

== Tuition ==
Tuition varies based on program. For California resident graduate students, the fees for the 2017-2018 academic year are $9,315.75 per semester; for nonresidents and international students, $16,866.75 per semester. For students in the Leadership Education and Teacher Education MA-only programs, the California resident fees are $11,827.25; for nonresidents and international students, it is $17,949.75. Fees include student services fees, tuition, campus fee, class pass transit fee, and health insurance fees. Health insurance fees may be waived if resident and nonresident graduate students provide verification that they have comparable health insurance coverage. Fees for the Summer Sessions vary according to the number of units taken and contingent upon resident, nonresident, and international student status. All fees are subject to change.

== Rankings ==
The U.S. News & World Report ranked UC Berkeley's School of Education seventh among top schools of education in the United States (third among all public institutions) in 2008.

As of 2018, U.S. News & World Report ranked the Graduate School of Education 19th among all schools of education (10th among all public institutions), tied with the University of Minnesota College of Education and Human Development.

According to the 2018 QS World University Rankings, UC Berkeley placed eighth in the world under the subject category, Education & Training.

== Notable people ==
=== Current faculty members ===
- Andrea diSessa
- Marcia Linn
- Elliot Turiel

=== Former faculty members ===
- Elmer Ellsworth Brown (1861–1934) - American educator, first Professor of the Science and Art of Teaching at UC Berkeley.
- W. Norton Grubb III (1948-2015) - American author, educational economist, and professor
- Alexis F. Lange (1862-1924) - First Dean of the Graduate School of Education.
- Arthur Jensen (1923-2012) - Professor Emeritus of Educational Psychology
- Jean Lave - Professor Emerita of Education and Geography

=== Alumni ===
- Natalia Anciso, Contemporary artist and educator
- Béla A. Bánáthy, Systems scientist
- Kathleen Barry, Sociologist and feminist
- Shirley Chater, Former Commissioner of the Social Security Administration
- Je'Rod Cherry, Former NFL player and radio personality
- Pema Chödrön, Ordained Tibetan Buddhist nun, author, and educator
- William John Cooper, Former US Commissioner of Education
- John E. Corbally, American academic administrator and former university president
- Laila Iskander, Social entrepreneur and Egypt's Minister of State for Environment Affairs
- Ernest Morrell, Educator, writer, Professor of English Education and Director of the Institute for Urban and Minority Education (IUME) at Teachers College, Columbia University, Past President of the National Council of Teachers of English (NCTE).
- Nancy Skinner, Member of the California State Senate
- Isiah Thomas, NBA Hall of Famer, philanthropist, and broadcaster
