= 1916 Cal Poly Mustangs football team =

American college football season

1916 Cal Poly Mustangs football
- Conference: Independent
- Record: 1–2
- Head coach: D. W. Schlosser (2nd season)

The 1916 Cal Poly Mustangs football team represented California Polytechnic School, now California Polytechnic State University, in the 1916 college football season. Led by second-year head coach D. W. Schlosser, Cal Poly compiled a record of 1–2 and were outscored by their opponents 56 to 25.

Cal Poly was a two-year school until 1941.

== Schedule ==
Date	Opponent	Site	Result
October 28	Santa Barbara High School	San Luis Obispo, CA	W 18–2
November 18	at Bakersfield High School	Bakersfield, CA	L 7–20
November 30	at Santa Barbara High School	Santa Barbara, CA	L 0–34
