= Bakersfield College =

Community college in Bakersfield, California, US

- Type: Public community college
- Established: 1913; 113 years ago
- Parent institution: Kern Community College District
- Chancellor: Dr. Sean Hancock (interim)
- President: Dr. Stacy Pfluger
- Students: 46,500
- Location: Bakersfield, California, United States; 35°24′35″N 118°58′24″W
- Campus: Suburban, 153 acres (62 ha)
- Colors: Red and white
- Nickname: Renegades
- Sporting affiliations: CCCAA – WSC, SCFA (football), SCWA (wrestling)
- Mascot: Knight
- Website: bakersfieldcollege.edu
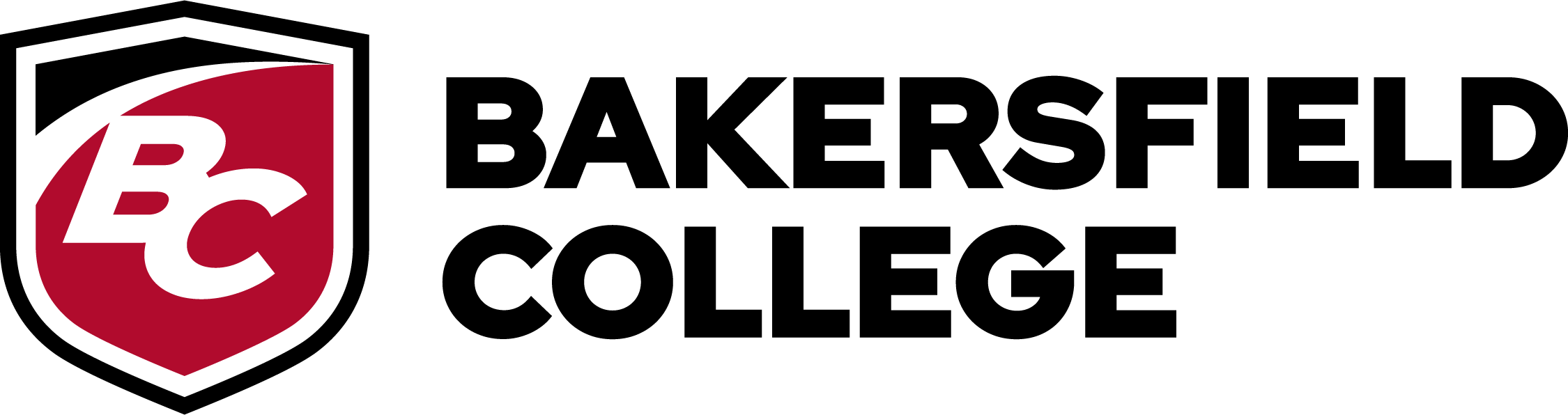

Bakersfield College (BC) is a public community college in Bakersfield, California, United States. BC serves about 31,000 students each semester or 46,500 annually, and offers associate degrees, certificate programs, and is one of fifteen California Community Colleges offering a baccalaureate degree. It is part of the Kern Community College District (KCCD), which is itself part of the California Community Colleges system.

== History ==
Founded in 1913 as Bakersfield Junior College, the school was initially housed on the campus of Bakersfield High School (then Kern County Union High School). In 1947, the school dropped "Junior" from its name. In 1956, Bakersfield College moved to its current location "on the hill" in northeast Bakersfield on the "Panorama Bluffs" that overlook the prolific Kern River Oil Field.

== Campus ==
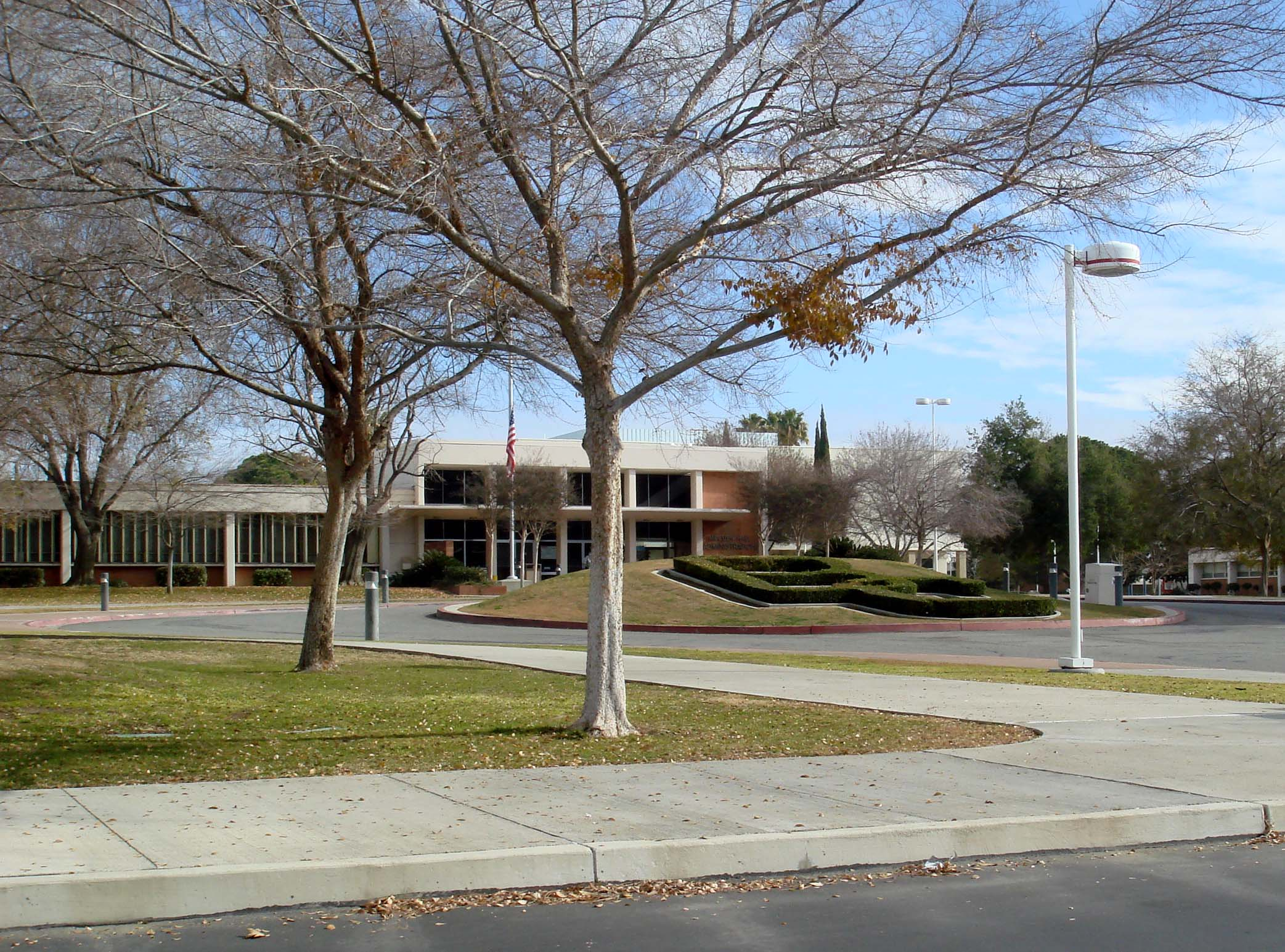
The former administration building (currently the welcome center) and main entrance

The main campus is located on a 153-acre (62 ha) plot in Northeast Bakersfield, and it also operates four satellite campuses: the Weill Institute in downtown Bakersfield, shared by the Kern Community College District, the SouthWest Campus also located in Bakersfield, the Delano Campus in Delano, approximately 35 miles (56 km) north of Bakersfield and the Arvin Educational Center in Arvin.

== Organization and administration ==
Bakersfield College (BC) is part of the Kern Community College District (KCCD).

== Academics ==
BC serves about 31,000 students each semester.

== Student life ==
Student demographics as of fall 2023
Race and ethnicity	Total
Hispanic	70%
White	17%
African American	4%
Multiracial	3%
Asian	2%
Filipino	2%

=== Newspaper ===
The Renegade Rip is the student newspaper of Bakersfield College. In publication since 1929, The Rip covers campus news as well as major events off campus. The paper won Associated Collegiate Press National Pacesetter Awards in 2003 and 2008.

=== Performing arts ===
The Renegade Pep Band supports the college's athletic teams.

Golden Empire Performing Arts is a non-profit 501(c)(3) account of the Bakersfield College Foundation that supports the Bakersfield College Drumline and the Golden Empire Drum and Bugle Corps.

== Athletics ==
The college's athletic teams are known as the Renegades ('Gades). The team competes as a member of the California Community College Athletic Association (CCCAA) in the Western State Conference (WSC) for all sports except football and wrestling, which compete in the Southern California Football Association (SCFA) and Southern California Wrestling Association (SCWA). The college has an extensive athletics program with 22 varsity teams, including men's and women's basketball, men's and women's cross country, men's and women's golf, football, soccer, volleyball, wrestling, baseball, softball, men's and women's tennis, men's and women's track and field, and men's and women's swimming.

Renegades football has a long tradition of success in junior college-level competition, and plays out of the 20,000-seat, on-campus Memorial Stadium.

== Notable people ==
- Brandon Banks, professional football player
- Robert Beltran, film and television actor
- Vern Burke, professional football player
- Tyrone Crawford, professional football player
- Chris DeFrance, professional football player
- Ric Drasin, professional wrestler, designer of the original Gold's Gym logo and the World Gym gorilla logo
- Phil Dumatrait, professional baseball player
- David Dunn, professional football player
- Jean Fuller, politician
- Frank Gifford, professional football player and sports commentator
- Liz Gorman, professional football player
- Dallas Grider, high school and college football coach
- Gerald Haslam, news and book author
- Joe Hernandez, professional football player
- George Jones, professional football player
- Junior Kennedy, professional baseball player
- Colby Lewis, professional baseball player
- Guy Madison, film and television actor
- Billy Mamaril, professional basketball player
- Rishard Matthews, professional football player
- Kevin McCarthy, politician
- Richard Miles, ambassador
- Spain Musgrove, professional football player
- Brennan Newberry, professional racecar driver
- Mark Nichols, professional football player
- Charles Noland, actor
- Rocky Rasley, professional football player
- Greg Robinson, college and professional football coach
- Michael Rubio, politician
- Carl Smith, professional football coach
- Taj Smith, professional football player
- Andre Spencer, professional basketball player
- Jeremy Staat, professional football player
- Walter W. Stiern, politician
- Jim Stiger, professional football player
- John Tarver, professional football player
- Randy Villegas, U.S. Representative-elect for California's 22nd congressional district
- Mike Waufle, professional football coach
- Dick Witcher, professional football player
- Delbert E. Wong, first Chinese-American judge in the continental United States
- Jake Woods, professional baseball player
- Louis Wright, professional football player
