= Spain Musgrove =

American football player (1945–2021)

No. 71, 77
- Positions: Defensive end, Defensive tackle

Personal information
- Born: July 30, 1945; Kansas City, Missouri, U.S.
- Died: August 20, 2021 (aged 76)
- Listed height: 6 ft 4 in (1.93 m)
- Listed weight: 275 lb (125 kg)

Career information
- High school: Bakersfield (Bakersfield, California)
- College: Utah State (1965-1966)
- NFL draft: 1967: 2nd round, 38th overall pick

Career history
- Washington Redskins (1967–1969); Houston Oilers (1970)

Career NFL statistics
- Sacks: 2.5
- Stats at Pro Football Reference

Spain Musgrove (July 30, 1945 – August 20, 2021) was an American football defensive tackle in the National Football League (NFL) for the Washington Redskins and the Houston Oilers from 1967 to 1970.

== Early career ==
Musgrove played high school football at Bakersfield High School in Bakersfield, California. He then attended Bakersfield College, a junior college, before playing college football at Utah State University (USU). Musgrove wore #76 while at USU, and went 4-6 during his senior year (1966).

== Professional career ==
Standing at 6'4" and weighing 275 lbs., Musgrove was drafted in the second round (38th overall) of the 1967 NFL/AFL draft by the Redskins. He was one of five Utah State Aggies football players selected in 1967. Musgrove would play for the Redskins from 1967 to 1969. He was then claimed off waivers in 1970 by the Oilers, where he would play his final season.
