= Smith and Williams =

American architecture company

Smith and Williams was an architecture firm based in South Pasadena, California and created in 1949. They were noted for their Modernist and Googie design style. The firm developed buildings and master planned communities. The Smith-Williams partnership was active until 1973.

They were described by Robert Winter as being experts in domestic architecture.

== History ==
Whitney R. Smith and Wayne Richard Williams began working together in 1946. Smith left the architecture firm in 1973.

=== Smith ===
Whitney Rowland Smith (January 16, 1911, Pasadena, California - March 13, 2002, Bend, Oregon) attended Pasadena City College, then graduated from USC around 1934. He then worked under Harwell Hamilton Harris and William Pereira in 1939–1940. He taught architecture at USC around 1945. He contributed to four designs in the Case Study Houses; two were built.

=== Williams ===
Wayne Richard Williams (1919, Los Angeles, California - November 27, 2007, Leesburg, Virginia) was born in Los Angeles in 1919, and went on to study architecture at USC until World War II, when he designed military buildings. After the war he received his architecture bachelor's degree from USC in 1947. He worked under Smith at USC, then established the firm together. Later, Williams worked for Giuseppe Cecchi's International Developers Inc. Williams became a fellow at the American Institute of Architects in 1964. Williams taught at UC-Berkeley in 1970.

== Significant designs ==
- Mutual Housing Tract, custom homes in Brentwood designed with A. Quincy Jones, Edgardo Contini, and James Charlton. 500 houses were designed, 82 were built.
- Friend Paper Company building, Pasadena (1965)
- Smith and Williams building, 1414 Fair Oaks, South Pasadena
- Googie-styled Mobile gas station, Harbor Boulevard, Anaheim (1956)
- Full Moon Tea House, Descanso Gardens (1966 with blue glazed tile roofing from Nara, Japan)
- Blue Ribbon Tract Housing, Reseda, Los Angeles (1953)
- Dorr-Siegel-Click-Hurley Medical Building, distinctively circular and diamond shaped psychiatric office from 1964
- Microdot company building, South Pasadena
- Palmitas and Cedritos residence halls at Cal Poly Pomona

- Buena Park City Hall
- Neighborhood Church (aka Neighborhood Unitarian Universalist Church), Pasadena, California
- Thatcher Music Building, Pomona College, Claremont, California

Master planned communities:

- Mission Bay Park, San Diego
- California City, California, designed with Garrett Eckbo; partially built, their designs are echoed in the Pavilion and Community Church
- Newport Dunes, for Irvine Company, unbuilt
- Port Holiday, unbuilt Lake Mead development for J. Carlton Adair
