= California City Detention Facility =

Secure facility in the United States

Coordinates: 35°09′10″N 117°51′33″W

California City Immigration Processing Center
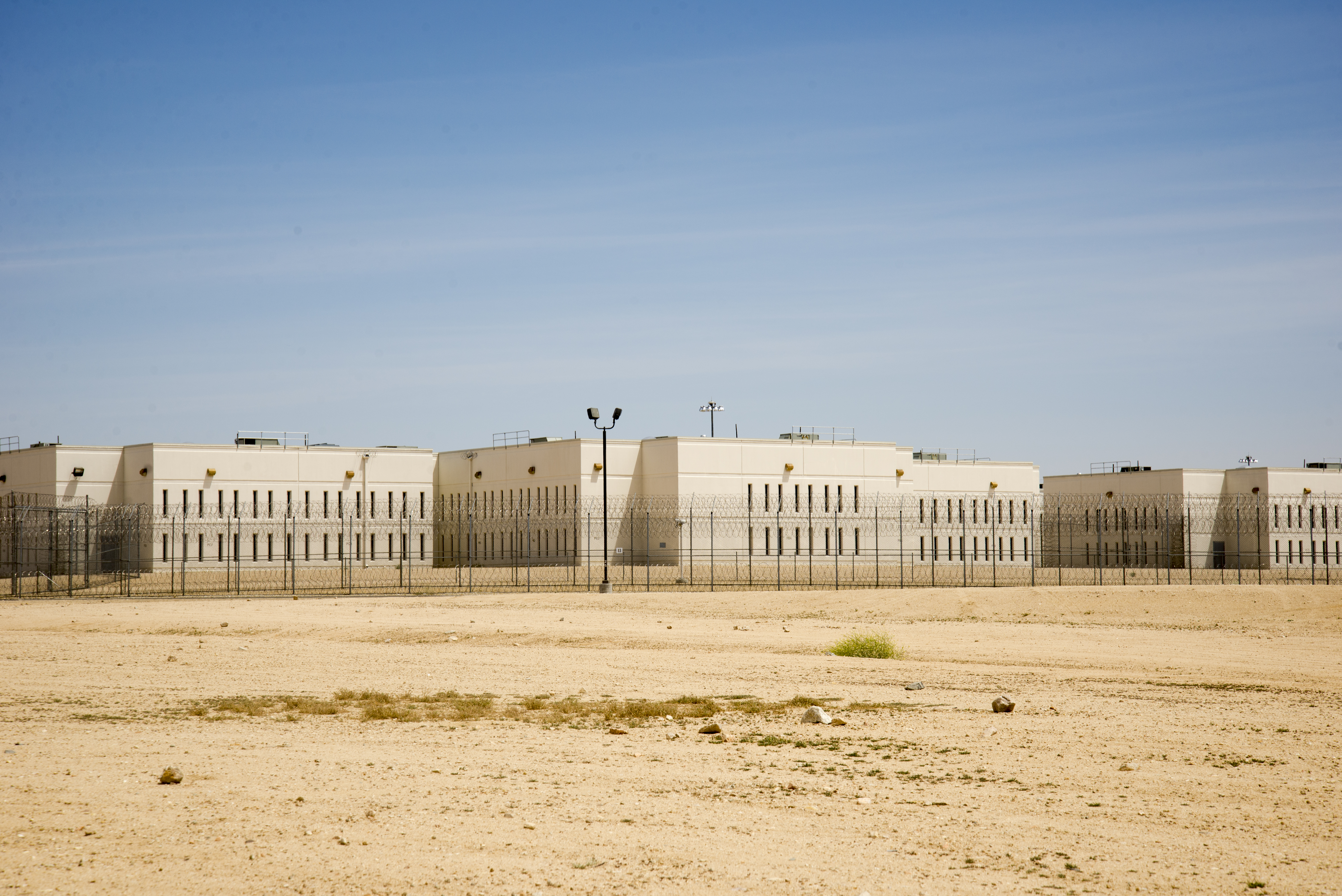
- California City Correctional Facility, May 2014
- Interactive map of California City Immigration Processing Center
- Location: 22844 Virginia Blvd California City, California
- Status: Operational
- Security class: Immigration detention center
- Capacity: 2,560
- Opened: Built in 1998, an Immigration Detention Facility since 2025.
- Managed by: CoreCivic under contract of the Federal Government

The California City Detention Facility, also known as the California City Immigration Processing Center, is an ICE detention center located in the Mojave Desert. The private prison corporation CoreCivic initially built the California City Correctional Facility at the site and has been under contract with the federal government since 2025 to detain both immigrant women and men. The facility was also formerly staffed and operated by the California Department of Corrections and Rehabilitation as a men's level II (low-medium) security prison.

== Location ==
It is located in the Mojave Desert of California about 100 miles (160km) north-east of Los Angeles and 75 miles (120km) east of Bakersfield.

== History ==
The California City Correctional Facility, California's first, large-scale private prison, was built on speculation, without any customer contract to fill it. Construction was completed in 1998 for a cost of $100 million. Beginning in 2006, it housed federal inmates for the U.S. Marshals Service and U.S. Immigration and Customs Enforcement. Until 2013, the federal contract included daily transportation to the San Diego County Superior Court and Southern Nevada Correctional Center, and as-needed to JPATS-Victorville ("Con Air").

In response to a federal order to reduce overcrowding at the state's prison facilities, the California Department of Corrections and Rehabilitation started leasing the facility in 2013 for $28.5 million yearly. Former guards, previously privately contracted, transferred to become state correctional officers after eight weeks of training. CAC was the only CDCR state prison under a lease arrangement. All inmates were moved out by November 2023. The state terminated its lease in March 2024.

=== Immigration Detention Facility ===
In 2025, it was opened as California's largest immigrant detention facility. Marquette Hawkins, California City mayor, said the city was exploring options to address violations, including possible fines, because CoreCivic did not have the proper permits or business license to operate the facility upon its opening.

According to California Attorney General Rob Bonta, the inspection by the California Department of Justice in November 2025 confirmed serious problems with conditions at the facility and a lack of adequate medical care. In December 2025, he wrote to Homeland Security about the facility's dangerous and inadequate living conditions. In January 2026, U.S. Senators Alex Padilla and Adam Schiff also decried poor conditions and the inadequacy of medical care.

Immigrants at the site launched a boycott in June 2026, alleging commissary price gouging, as an 8-ounce jar of instant coffee costs $18 and a box of 40 tampons costs nearly $21. Volunteers are paid US$1 per day for cooking and cleaning. CoreCivic sold the facility to the U.S. Department of Homeland Security in 2026.
