= California City, California =

City in California, United States

- City
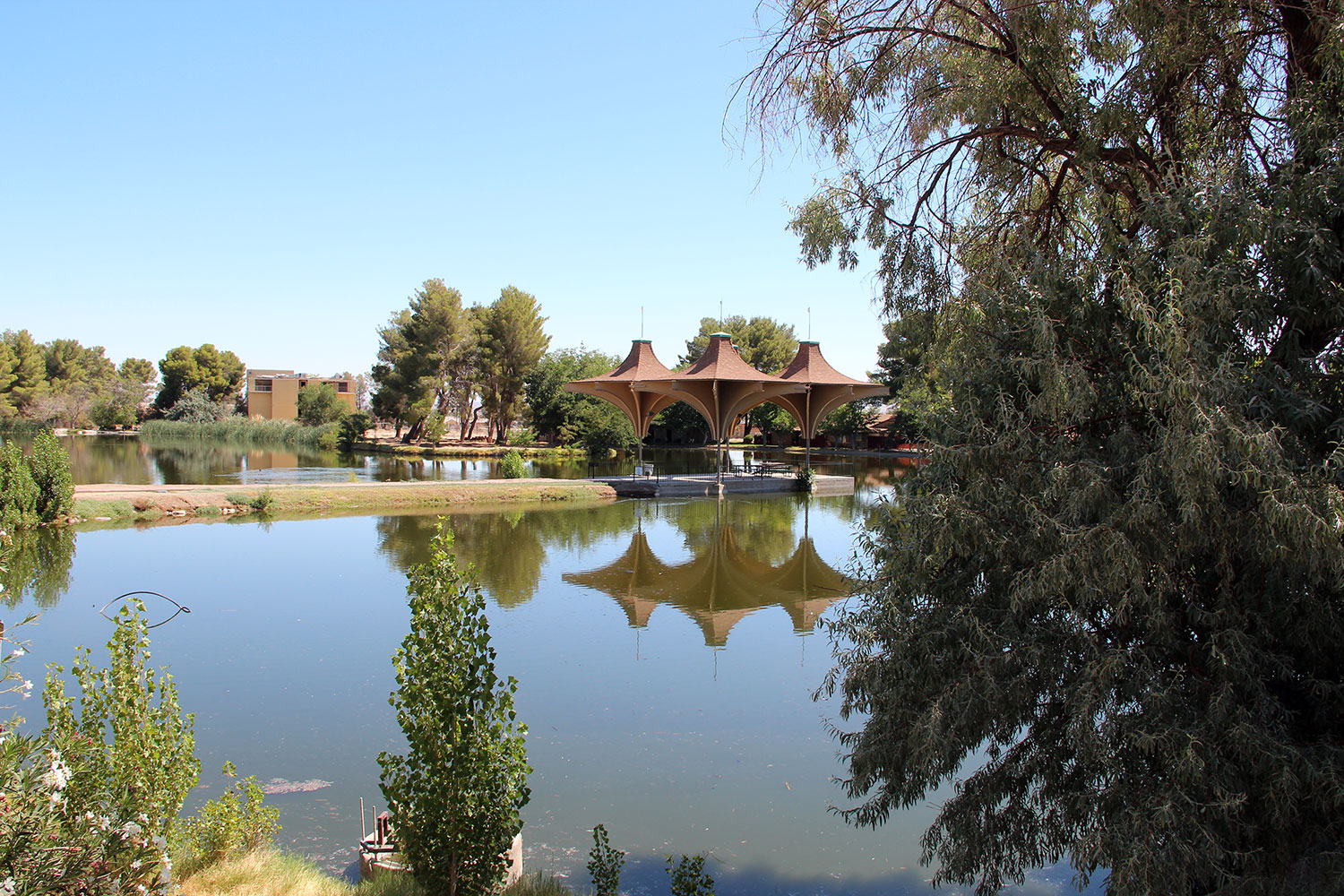
- West Side of California City Central Park

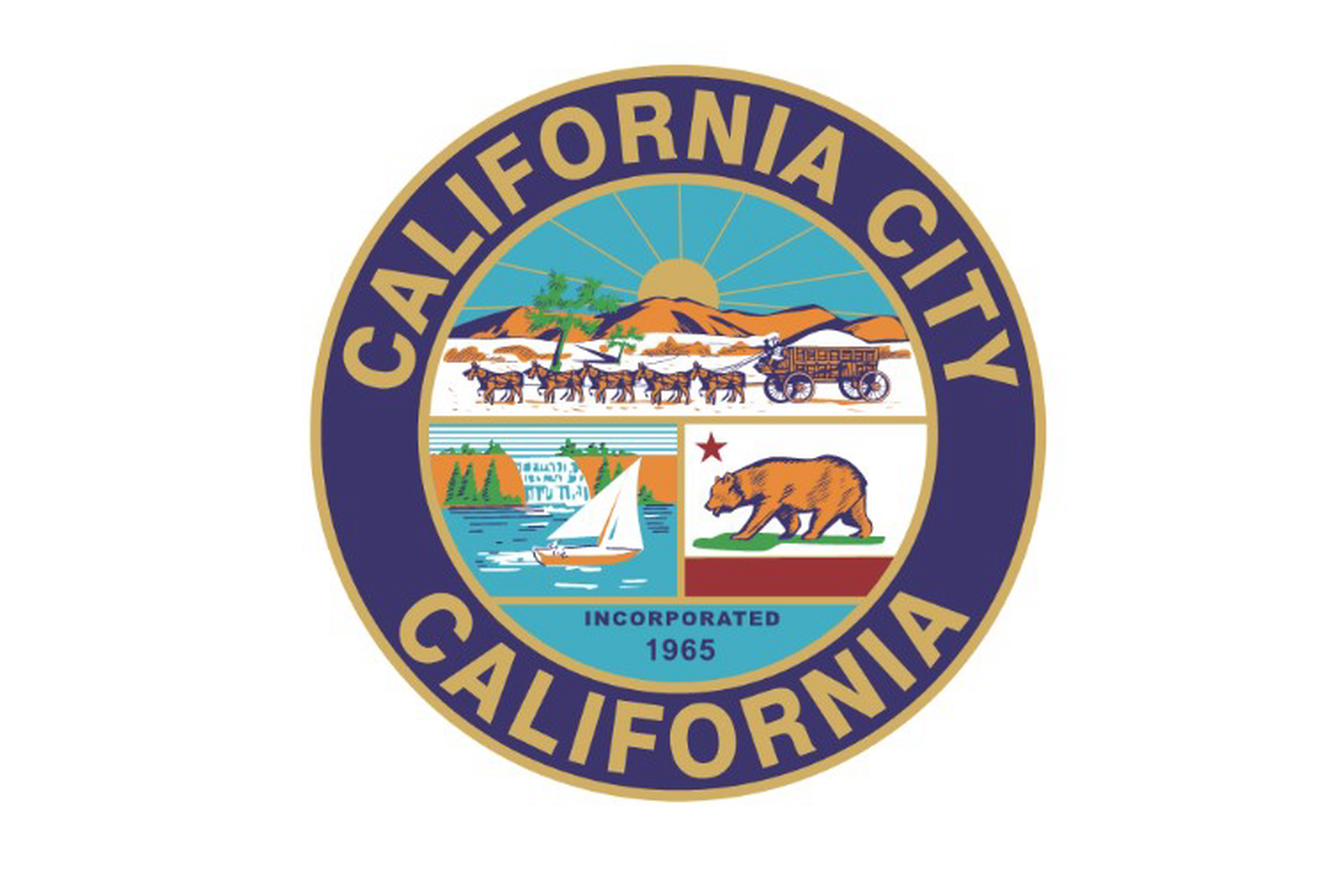
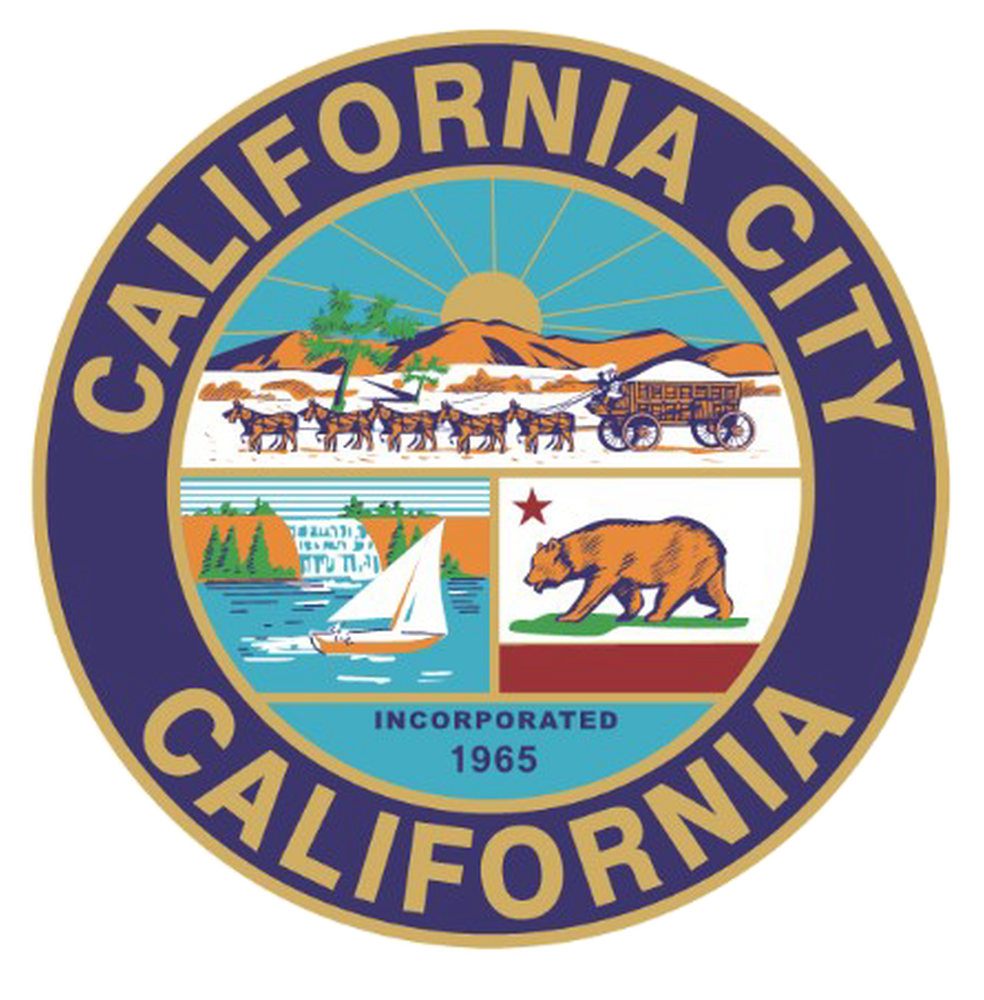
- Flag Seal
- Nickname: Cal City
- Interactive map of California City, California
- Coordinates: 35°07′33″N 117°59′09″W
- Country: United States
- State: California
- County: Kern
- Incorporated: December 10, 1965
- Named for: California

Government
  - Mayor: Marq Hawkins
  - Mayor Pro Tem: Jim Creighton

Area
  - Total: 203.70 sq mi (527.57 km^{2})
  - Land: 203.61 sq mi (527.35 km^{2})
  - Water: 0.085 sq mi (0.22 km^{2}) 0.04%
- Elevation: 2,405 ft (733 m)

Population (2020)
  - Total: 14,973
  - Density: 73.5/sq mi (28.39/km^{2})
- Time zone: UTC−08:00 (PST)
  - Summer (DST): UTC−07:00 (PDT)
- ZIP Codes: 93504-93505
- Area codes: 442/760 and 661
- FIPS code: 06-09780
- GNIS feature IDs: 1660418, 2409960
- Website: www.californiacity-ca.gov

California City is a city located in northern Antelope Valley in Kern County, California, United States. It is 100 miles (160 km) north of the city of Los Angeles, and the population was 14,973 at the 2020 census. Covering 203.63 square miles (527.4 km^{2}), California City has the third-largest land area of any city in the state of California (behind San Diego and Los Angeles), and is the largest city in California, by land area, that is not a county seat. It is the 43rd-largest city in the United States by land area. Despite its massive size, a large portion of the city remains unfinished, with a grid of paved roads that have no houses and have yet to be completed.

Many of the city's residents are employed at Edwards Air Force Base, which is located 18 miles (29 km) southeast of the city. Other major employers are the California City Detention Facility, Mojave Air and Space Port (and its flight test facility) and the Hyundai/Kia Proving Grounds, located in the rural southwestern part of the city. California City also has a park, a PGA golf course, and a municipal airport.

== History ==
=== Early ===
Padre Francisco Garcés, a Franciscan missionary, camped at Castle Butte (what is now California City) during the Juan Bautista de Anza expedition of Alta California (1776).

In the late 19th century, the Twenty-Mule Team Trail, which carried loads of borax to the railhead in Mojave from Harmony Borax Works' mines to the east, ran through the California City area.

=== Military ===
The Mojave Gunnery Range "C" was used from August 1944 until January 1959, when it became California City land; this had included bombing ranges and strafing targets, such as a vehicle convoy. It was also used for pilotless aircraft just after World War II. Unexploded ordnance and toxic waste is associated with the site; the Army Corps of Engineers began surveying the site in 1999 and, by 2001, the range was described as encompassing 20,908 acres (8,461 ha) southwest of the California City center. Site surveys in 1999 found MK 23 3-pound practice bombs with unfired signal cartridges and 20 mm target practice projectiles, along with 2.25", 2.75" and 5" practice rockets, undetonated bombs and small arms ammunition (from .22 to .50 caliber). The largest fuzed and most dangerous bombs discovered were a pair of 100-pound general purpose bombs.

=== Town ===
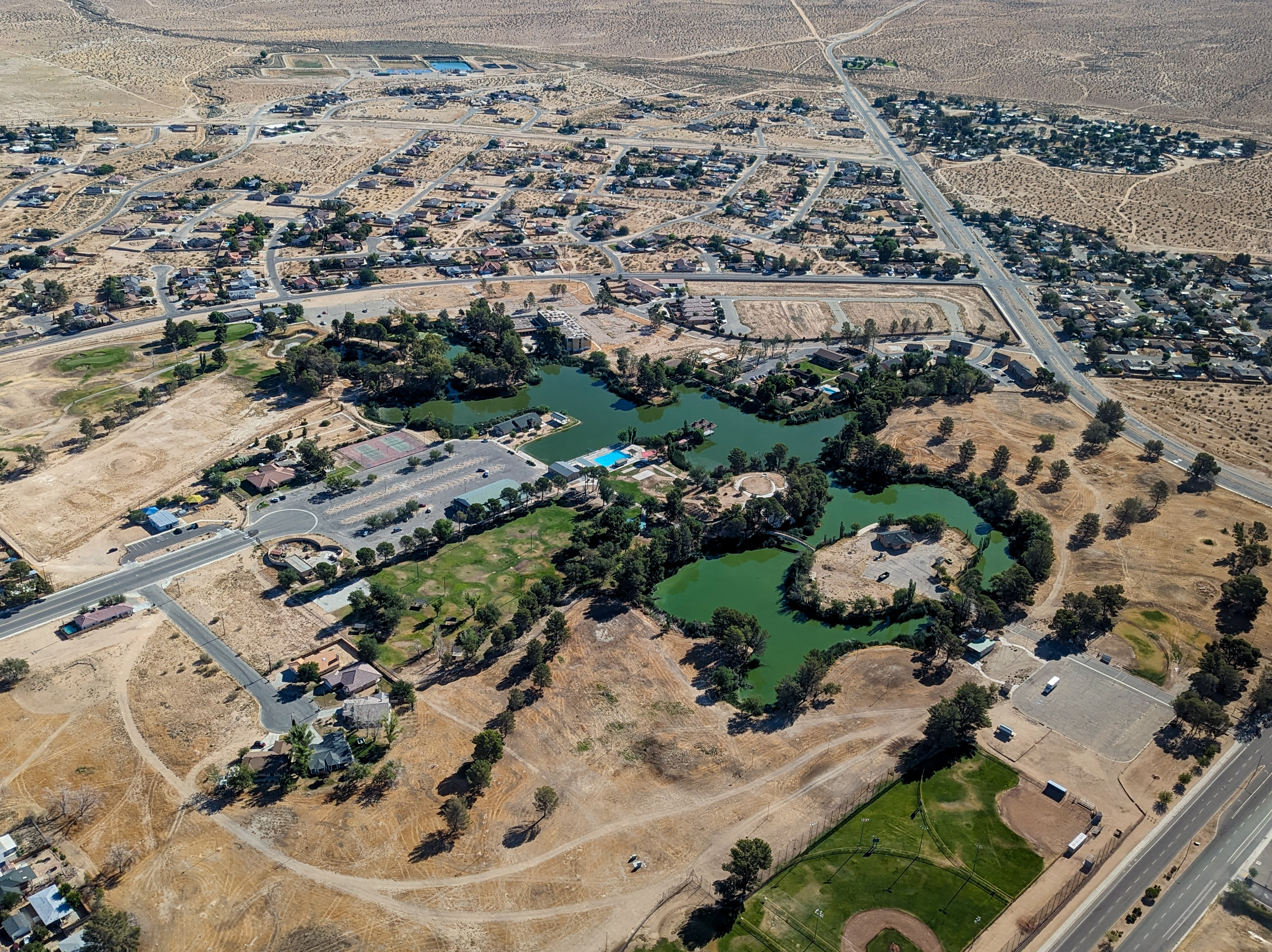
California City Central Park

The city was formed in 1958, when developers purchased 82,000 acres (33,000 ha), 128 square miles or 332 square km of western Mojave Desert. The new city was aggressively marketed. Developers pitched the city as a northern alternative to Los Angeles, which the developers argued could not handle the post-war population-boom, and the region needed other communities to share the increase. Instead of being built piecemeal, the whole city would be developed simultaneously. The city was designed to be a planned community. The masterplan was prepared by Smith and Williams and architect Garrett Eckbo at the behest of real estate developer and sociology professor Nat Mendelsohn. The city included a central park with a 26-acre (11 ha) manmade lake, two golf courses, and a new Holiday Inn. Mendelsohn was then president of a corporation called the California City Development Company. There were conflicting reports that the city was built over a large aquifer. The city was originally designed to accommodate 400,000 people, with a downtown center capable of holding 80,000–100,000, and satellite suburbs housing the rest.

A post office opened in 1960, and the city incorporated in 1965, when it had 158 square miles (410 km^{2}) of land, 5,900 landowners, 817 residents, and 232 homes.

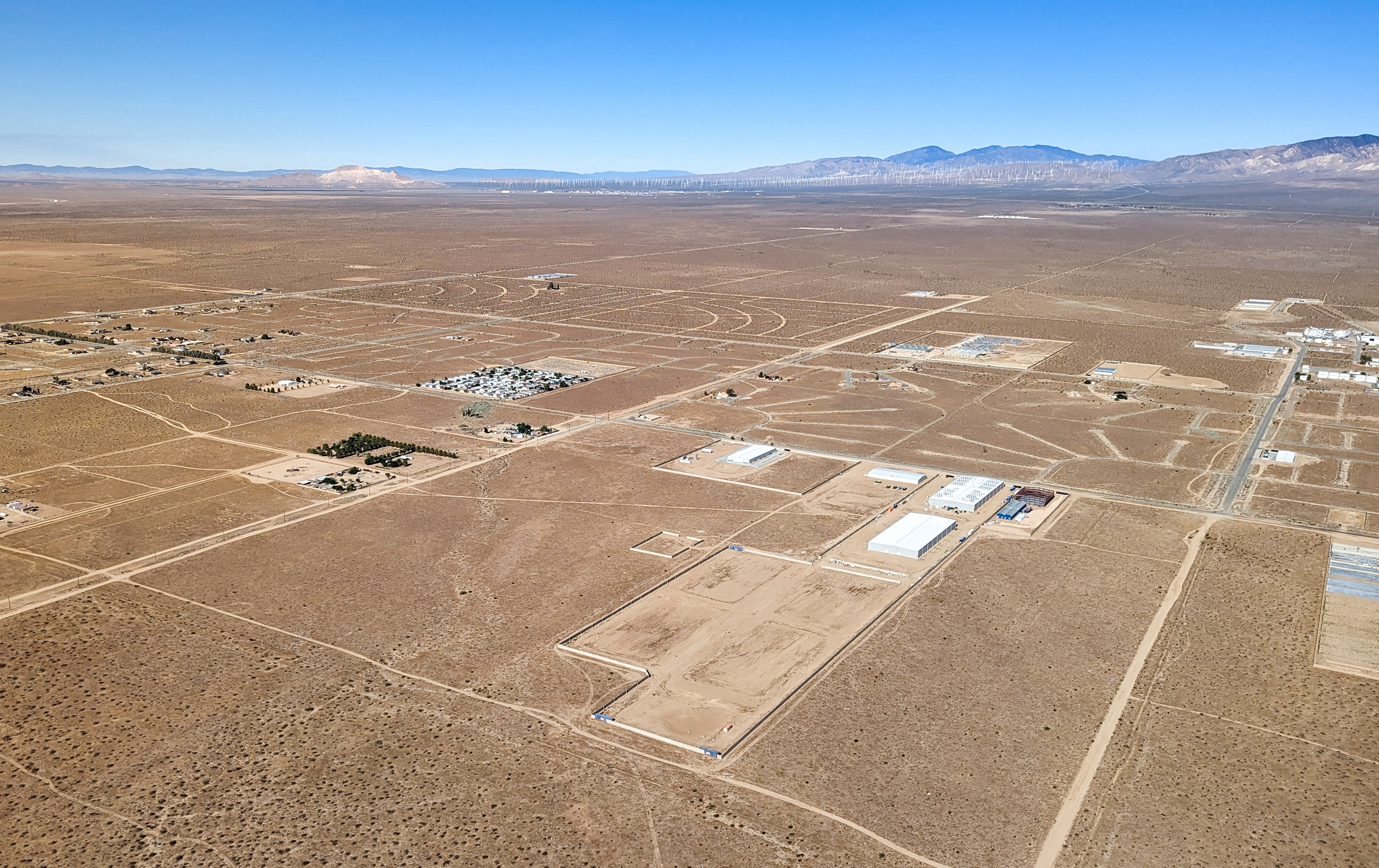
Unbuilt neighborhoods in California City

By 1965, population growth was less than the developer's projection, leaving a grid of paved roads with thousands of landowners, but with little construction activity, and by 1969 only about 1,300 people lived in the city. The Federal Trade Commission began inspecting the development company in 1969, and Ralph Nader's 25-person California task force (part of "Nader's Raiders") published Power and Land in California in 1971. Part of the book focused on California City, calling it a fraud and "a particularly stark study of government failure." By the 1970s, over 50,000 lots had been sold and the market declined. The Federal Trade Commission filed a cease and desist against the home seller for misleading advertising about the city, and in 1977, over 14,000 landowners receiving partial refunds from a $4 million pool, the largest FTC settlement to date. The sales company was also required to invest $16 million in long-promised infrastructure in various cities.

California City had a population of 3,200 in 1985 and over 14,000 in 2018, clustered around the west end.

In 2015, it was reported that California City's water usage had exceeded expectations, increasing by 28% in May of that year. The rapidly increasing water usage was blamed on aging pipes beneath undeveloped portions of the city, faulty pumps reporting exaggerated figures, and the large number of inmates and workers at California City Correctional Facility.

In June 2016, California City became the first city of Kern County, California, to allow commercial cannabis cultivation. The city anticipated an eventual profit of $10 million+ a year in tax revenue from the new policy; by the first quarter of 2023, the city had made around $98,000 in cannabis-related revenues.

== Geography ==
Although one of California's smaller cities in terms of population, California City is the third largest city in California by land area. Satellite photos underscore its claim to being California's third-largest city by land area (40th largest in the United States). Located in the northern Antelope Valley in Kern County, the city is 18 miles (29 km) northwest of Edwards Air Force Base, 28 miles (45 km) east of Tehachapi, 40 miles (64 km) north of Lancaster, 49 miles (79 km) southwest of Ridgecrest, 67 miles (108 km) east of the city of Bakersfield, and 101 miles (163 km) north of the city of Los Angeles.

=== Geology ===
In 2000, the depth to groundwater was 370 feet (110 m).

The Garlock Fault runs nearby.

=== Climate ===
Climate data for California City, CA
| Month | Jan | Feb | Mar | Apr | May | Jun | Jul | Aug | Sep | Oct | Nov | Dec | Year |
|---|---|---|---|---|---|---|---|---|---|---|---|---|---|
| Mean daily maximum °F (°C) | 58 (14) | 62 (17) | 66 (19) | 72 (22) | 81 (27) | 91 (33) | 97 (36) | 96 (36) | 90 (32) | 79 (26) | 66 (19) | 58 (14) | 76 (25) |
| Mean daily minimum °F (°C) | 34 (1) | 37 (3) | 41 (5) | 46 (8) | 54 (12) | 62 (17) | 67 (19) | 66 (19) | 59 (15) | 49 (9) | 39 (4) | 33 (1) | 49 (9) |
| Average precipitation inches (mm) | 1.34 (34) | 1.51 (38) | 1.13 (29) | 0.22 (5.6) | 0.15 (3.8) | 0.05 (1.3) | 0.16 (4.1) | 0.27 (6.9) | 0.28 (7.1) | 0.28 (7.1) | 0.43 (11) | 0.81 (21) | 6.63 (168.9) |
Source: The Weather Channel

== Demographics ==
Historical population
| Census | Pop. | Note | %± |
|---|---|---|---|
| 1970 | 1,309 | | — |
| 1980 | 2,743 | | 109.5% |
| 1990 | 5,955 | | 117.1% |
| 2000 | 8,385 | | 40.8% |
| 2010 | 14,120 | | 68.4% |
| 2020 | 14,973 | | 6.0% |
U.S. Decennial Census

=== Racial and ethnic composition ===
California City city, California – Racial and ethnic composition Note: the US Census treats Hispanic/Latino as an ethnic category. This table excludes Latinos from the racial categories and assigns them to a separate category. Hispanics/Latinos may be of any race.
| Race / Ethnicity (NH = Non-Hispanic) | Pop 2000 | Pop 2010 | Pop 2020 | % 2000 | % 2010 | % 2020 |
|---|---|---|---|---|---|---|
| White alone (NH) | 5,136 | 5,640 | 4,601 | 61.25% | 39.94% | 30.73% |
| Black or African American alone (NH) | 1,039 | 2,028 | 3,385 | 12.39% | 14.36% | 22.61% |
| Native American or Alaska Native alone (NH) | 100 | 73 | 85 | 1.19% | 0.52% | 0.57% |
| Asian alone (NH) | 292 | 341 | 377 | 3.48% | 2.42% | 2.52% |
| Native Hawaiian or Pacific Islander alone (NH) | 25 | 53 | 46 | 0.30% | 0.38% | 0.31% |
| Other race alone (NH) | 16 | 36 | 96 | 0.19% | 0.25% | 0.64% |
| Mixed race or Multiracial (NH) | 355 | 564 | 889 | 4.23% | 3.99% | 5.94% |
| Hispanic or Latino (any race) | 1,422 | 5,385 | 5,494 | 16.96% | 38.14% | 36.69% |
| Total | 8,385 | 14,120 | 14,973 | 100.00% | 100.00% | 100.00% |

=== 2020 census ===
As of the 2020 census, California City had a population of 14,973 and a population density of 73.5 inhabitants per square mile (28.4/km^{2}). The median age was 34.5 years. The age distribution was 24.0% under the age of 18, 9.7% aged 18 to 24, 31.1% aged 25 to 44, 23.1% aged 45 to 64, and 12.1% who were 65 years of age or older. For every 100 females, there were 131.6 males, and for every 100 females age 18 and over there were 142.0 males age 18 and over.

The census reported that 86.2% of the population lived in households and 13.8% were institutionalized. There were 4,628 households, out of which 36.3% included children under the age of 18, 40.0% were married-couple households, 9.1% were cohabiting couple households, 27.4% had a female householder with no spouse or partner present, and 23.5% had a male householder with no spouse or partner present. 25.2% of households were one person, and 10.9% were one person aged 65 or older. The average household size was 2.79. There were 3,112 families (67.2% of all households).

There were 5,196 housing units at an average density of 25.5 units per square mile (9.8 units/km^{2}), of which 4,628 (89.1%) were occupied and 568 (10.9%) were vacant. Of the occupied units, 57.2% were owner-occupied, and 42.8% were occupied by renters. The homeowner vacancy rate was 3.2% and the rental vacancy rate was 8.1%.

0.0% of residents lived in urban areas, while 100.0% lived in rural areas.

=== 2023 estimate ===
In 2023, the US Census Bureau estimated that the median household income was $55,271, and the per capita income was $23,266. About 22.6% of families and 24.3% of the population were below the poverty line.

=== 2010 census ===
At the 2010 census California City had a population of 14,120. The population density was 69.3 inhabitants per square mile (26.8/km^{2}). The racial makeup of California City was 9,188 (65.1%) White (39.9% were non-Hispanic whites), 2,150 (15.2%) African American, 132 (0.9%) Native American, 367 (2.6%) Asian, 59 (0.4%) Pacific Islander, 1,431 (10.1%) from other races, and 793 (5.6%) from two or more races. Hispanic or Latino of any race were 5,385 persons (38.1%).

The census reported that 11,506 people (81.5% of the population) lived in households, no one lived in non-institutionalized group quarters and 2,614 (18.5%) were institutionalized.

There were 4,102 households, 1,611 (39.3%) had children under the age of 18 living in them, 1,980 (48.3%) were opposite-sex married couples living together, 630 (15.4%) had a female householder with no husband present, 287 (7.0%) had a male householder with no wife present. There were 335 (8.2%) unmarried opposite-sex partnerships, and 22 (0.5%) same-sex married couples or partnerships. 949 households (23.1%) were one person and 312 (7.6%) had someone living alone who was 65 or older. The average household size was 2.80. There were 2,897 families (70.6% of households); the average family size was 3.30.

The age distribution was 3,449 people (24.4%) under the age of 18, 1,294 people (9.2%) aged 18 to 24, 4,617 people (32.7%) aged 25 to 44, 3,570 people (25.3%) aged 45 to 64, and 1,190 people (8.4%) who were 65 or older. The median age was 34.8 years. For every 100 females, there were 144.0 males. For every 100 females age 18 and over, there were 160.1 males.

There were 5,210 housing units at an average density of 25.6 per square mile, of the occupied units 2,474 (60.3%) were owner-occupied and 1,628 (39.7%) were rented. The homeowner vacancy rate was 8.3%; the rental vacancy rate was 22.5%. 6,584 people (46.6% of the population) lived in owner-occupied housing units and 4,922 people (34.9%) lived in rental housing units.

== Economy ==
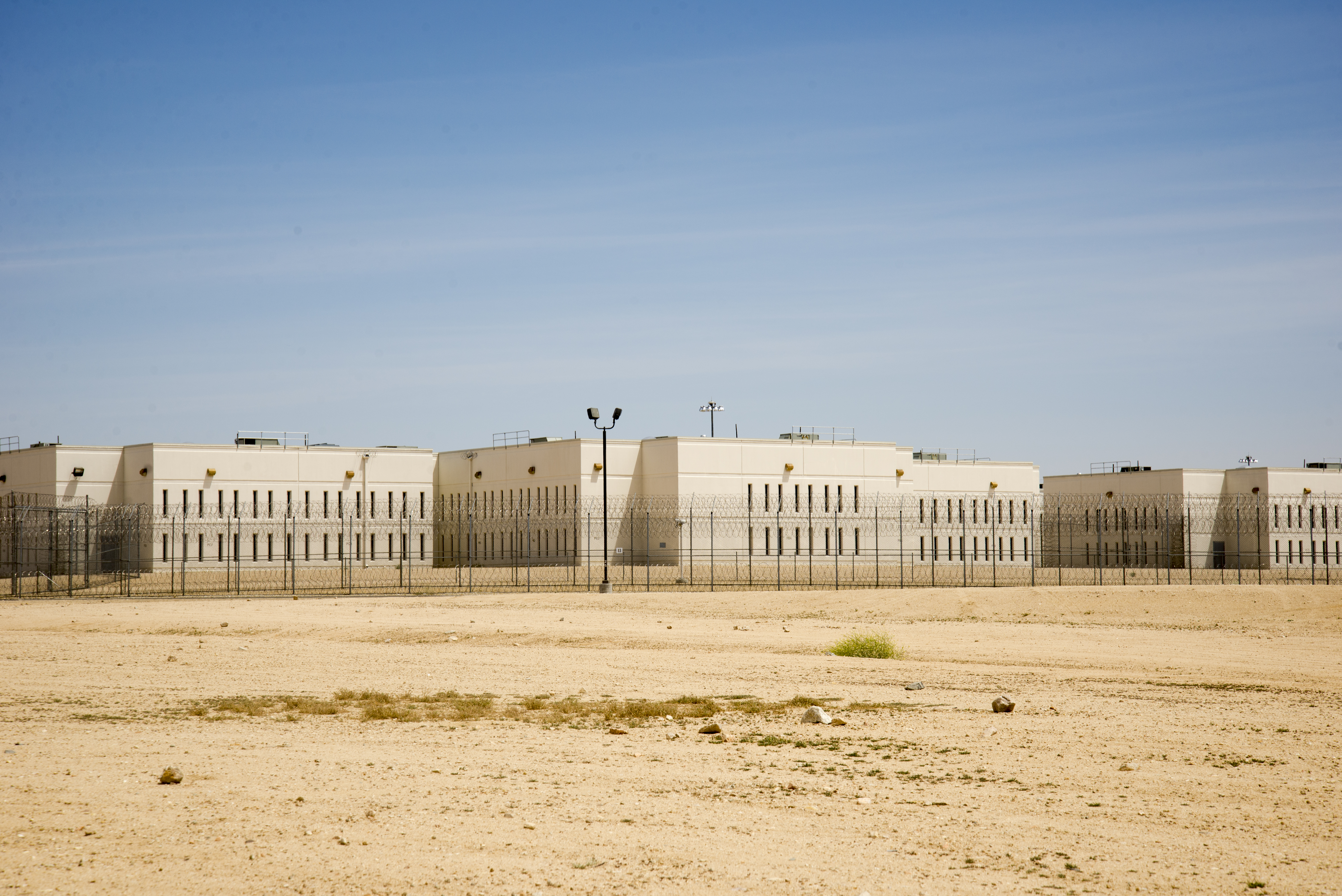
The California City Correctional Center in 2014

Studies for a privately built and owned 2,000–4,000-bed prison on the east side of town began in 1995, and an environmental impact statement on a 550-bed facility was completed in 1996. Contracts were signed between the city and Corrections Corporation of America and it was built in 1999. The 2,304-bed California City Correctional Facility prison housed federal inmates for the U.S. Marshal Service and U.S. Immigration and Customs Enforcement from 2006 to 2013, then was leased to the California Department of Corrections and Rehabilitation in 2013 for $28.5 million per year in response to a federal order to reduce overcrowding in the state's prison facilities. All inmates were moved out by November 2023. The prison was closed in March 2024 when the state terminated its lease. However, it was reactivated in 2025 to serve as a California City Detention Facility operated by CoreCivic on behalf of ICE.

The 3,967 acres (1,605 ha) Hyundai-Kia proving grounds are in the city boundaries. 640 acres (260 ha) are in use.

== Sports ==
The California City Whiptails were a professional baseball team competing in the unaffiliated Pecos League. The team folded in 2019. Their home games were played at Balsitis Park.

== Education ==
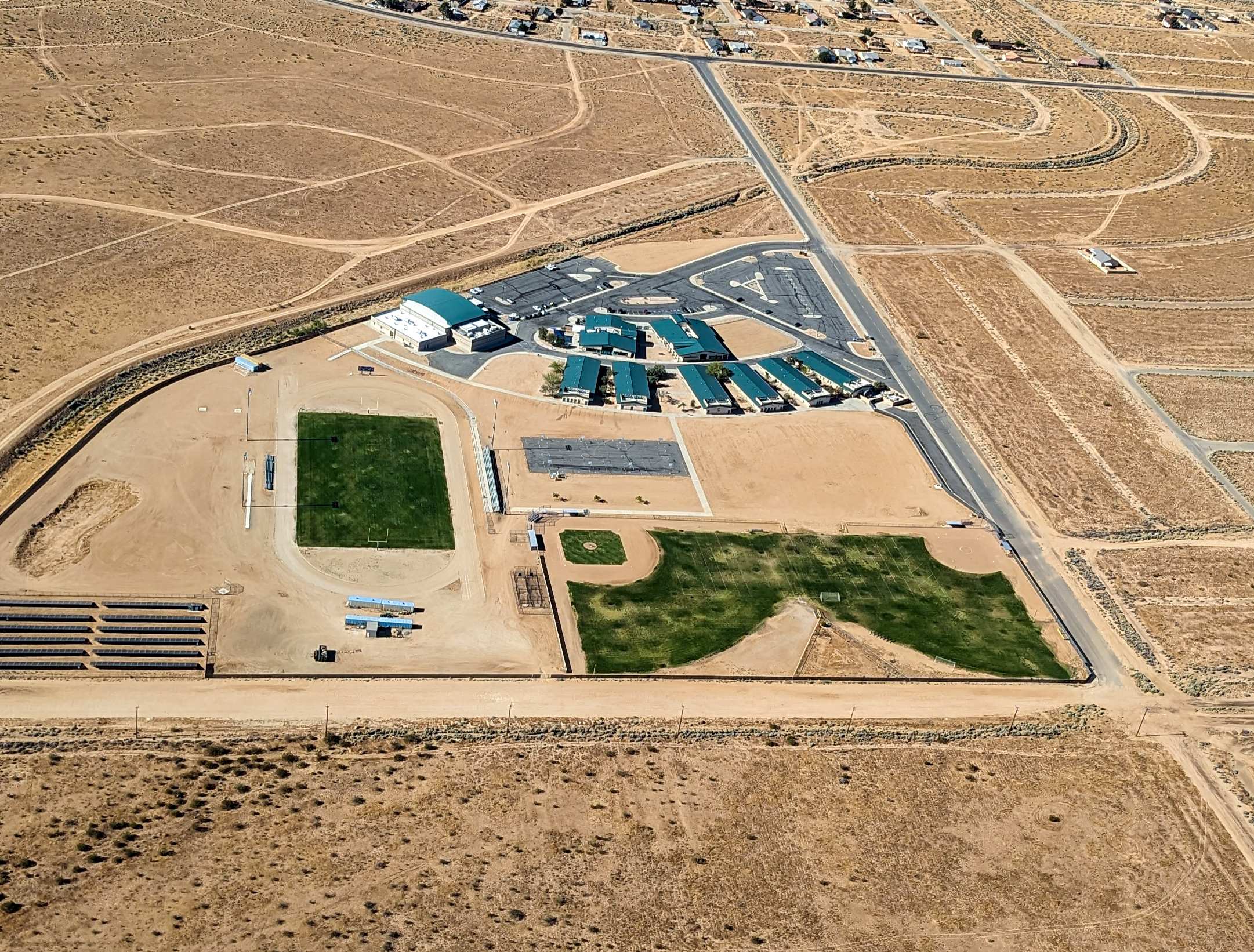
Overhead view of California City High School

Mojave Unified School District serves California City:

- California City Jr/Sr High
- California City Middle
- Hacienda Elementary school
- Robert P. Ulrich Elementary School (1966)

== Infrastructure ==
=== Transportation ===
California City is served by Highway 14 to the west and Highway 58 to the south. Kern Transit provides direct bus service to Mojave, Lancaster, and Ridgecrest with connections to Tehachapi and Bakersfield. The Kern Transit 250 bus to Lancaster provides a direct connection with Metrolink's Antelope Valley Line, with service into the San Fernando Valley and Los Angeles. Within the city, California City Dial-A-Ride (DAR) Transit provides transportation on a demand-response basis on weekdays (except on holidays when City Hall is closed).

=== Public safety ===
As an incorporated city that does not contract with Kern County, California City has its own police and fire departments.

== See also ==
- 2024 California City mayoral election
