= Liz Gorman (American football) =

American football player (born 1987)

Personal information
- Date of birth: March 30, 1987 (age 39)
- Place of birth: Syracuse, New York, U.S.
- Positions: Midfielder; forward

Youth career
- 2001: Hamilton Emerald Knights
- 2002–2003: Stockdale Mustangs
- Bakersfield Gunners

College career
Years	Team	Apps	(Gls)
2005–2006	Judson Eagles	38	(9)
2007–2008	Florida Southern Moccasins	40	(11)

Elizabeth Grace Gorman (born March 30, 1987) is a former American football player in the Lingerie Football League (LFL). Her LFL awards include 2010 Defensive Player of the Year, and being named an All-Star in 2010 and 2011. Gorman was also a Defensive Player of the Year nominee in 2011. Prior to playing in the LFL, she played soccer.

== Early life ==
Gorman attended Hamilton Central High School, where she played varsity basketball, soccer and softball. In 2001, she was a member of the school soccer team that won regionals and state, contributing two goals in the semifinals. She then attended Stockdale High School for the next two years where she played soccer and graduated in 2004. After tearing her anterior cruciate ligament in the Valley semi-finals, she took one year off, playing club and attended Bakersfield College, where she received her associate degree in art.

== College ==
Gorman earned a soccer scholarship to Judson University, where she played two soccer seasons, scoring 9 goals and recording 10 assists in 28 appearances. In 2007, she left to have knee surgery, recovering in Lakeland, Florida. She finished her degree in public relations and advertising while playing her last year of eligibility in soccer at Florida Southern College in the Sunshine State Conference, was honored as NCAA player of the week during the 2008–2009 season and helped her team reach the second round of the NCAA tournament. In total, she scored 11 goals and recorded 10 assists in 40 appearances for Florida Southern.

== Career ==
Gorman entered the LFL by signing as a free agent with the Tampa Breeze late in the pre-season of the Lingerie Football League's inaugural season in 2009–2010 and has played for the Breeze for each of the first two seasons. She was named LFL Defensive player of the Year and to the All-Fantasy team in 2010, helping the East to victory in the All-Fantasy Game played in Monterey, Mexico and won by the East, 36–14. In 2011, the team fell short of the Championship game, but she was again nominated for the LFL Defensive Player of the Year award and was named to her second All-Fantasy team. Gorman shared the game's Most Valuable Player award for helping to lead the East to a comeback 23–18 win. In 2013, she signed with the Los Angeles Temptation but missed most of the season due to an injury. As a fitness model, she appeared in a three-page spread in Women's Running magazine. She has wrestled from 2011 to 2012 for Grapplinggirls.

During her career, Gorman spoke out against the LFL uniform, saying that it was too skimpy and wishing that it was more conservative.

== LFL stats ==
Year	Team	Tckl	Solo	Ast	Sacks	TFL	Int	Yards	Avg	Long	TD	FF	FR
2013	Los Angeles Temptation	0	0	0	0	0	0	0	0	0	0	0	0
