= Alexis F. Lange =

American university dean

Alexis Frederick Lange (1862 – August 28, 1924) was the Dean of the School of Education at the University of California, Berkeley and led the effort to found the community college system in the state of California.
