= Kern Community College District =

Public community colleges in Kern County, California, United States

Coordinates: 35.3781°N 119.0182°W

- Type: Public, Community College
- Established: 1968; 58 years ago
- Accreditation: Western Association of Schools and Colleges
- Budget: $134 million
- Chancellor: Dr. Sean Hancock (interim)
- Academic staff: 863 (2010)
- Administrative staff: 538
- Undergraduates: 29,334 (2010)
- Location: Kern County, California, Bakersfield, United States
- Campus: 3
- Website: www.kccd.edu

Kern Community College District is a community college district in Kern County, California. Colleges part of the district are: Bakersfield College, Porterville College, and Cerro Coso Community College.
