= 2026 junior college football season =

American junior college football season

- National Championship: Bain–Schaeffer Buffalo Stadium, Canyon, TX, (NJCAA D-I); Red Grange Bowl, Glen Ellyn, IL, (NJCAA D-III)

The 2026 junior college football season is the season of intercollegiate junior college football running from August to December 2026. The season will end with three national champions: one from the National Junior College Athletic Association's (NJCAA) Division I and Division III, respectively, and one from the California Community College Athletic Association (3C2A).

== Conference changes and new programs ==
=== Membership changes ===
Team	Former conference	New conference	Ref
Andrew Fighting Tigers	GCAA	SSAC (NAIA)	
De Anza Mountain Lions	Golden Coast League	Bay 6 League	
Diablo Valley Vikings	Bay 6 League	Norcal League	
Lackawanna Falcons	Northeast	PSAC (NCAA)	
Monroe Mustangs	Northeast	Northeast 10 (NCAA)	
Northeastern Oklahoma A&M Golden Norsemen	SWJCFC	Independent (NJCAA D-I)	
Orange Coast Pirates	NCL	No program	
Salem Mighty Oaks	New program	Independent (NJCAA D–III)	
Shasta Knights	Norcal League	Golden Coast League	
Snow Badgers	Independent (NJCAA D–I)	SWJCFC	

== Notable headlines ==
- August 4, 2026 – Before the season, Pierce College puts its season on hiatus citing insufficient roster numbers.
- September 10, 2026 – Minnesota West C&T cancels the remainder of its season citing insufficient roster numbers.
- October 19, 2026 – Compton cancels the remainder of its season due to injuries leading to insufficient roster numbers.

== Top 5 matchups ==
Rankings are based on the NJCAA Division I, NJCAA Division III, and 3C2A polls.

=== Regular season ===
- Week 3
  - No. 5 (D1) Mississippi Gulf Coast defeated No. 3 (D1) Northwest Mississippi, 36–34 (Ranger Stadium at Bobby Franklin Field, Senatobia, Mississippi)
  - No. 5 (3C2A) San Mateo defeated No. 4 (3C2A) Butte, 10–7 (John B. Cowan Stadium, Oroville, California)
- Week 4
  - No. 1 (3C2A) Riverside City defeated No. 2 (3C2A) Saddleback, 38–21 (Saddleback Stadium, Mission Viejo, California)
- Week 5
  - No. 3 (3C2A) San Mateo defeated No. 2 (3C2A) Diablo Valley, 51–10 (College Heights Stadium, San Mateo, California)
- Week 6
  - No. 3 (D3) Hudson Valley defeated No. 5 (D3) Erie, 21–19 (West Herr Stadium, Orchard Park, New York)
  - No. 2 (D1) Hutchinson defeated No. 1 (D1) Iowa Western, 26–0 (Gowans Stadium, Hutchinson, Kansas)
- Week 7
  - No. 2 (D3) Louisburg defeated No. 3 (D3) Hudson Valley, 15–7 (Outdoor Athletic Complex, Troy, New York)
- Week 8
  - No. 1 (3C2A) Riverside City defeated No. 3 (3C2A) Southwestern (CA), 38–28 (Wheelock Stadium, Riverside, California)
  - No. 5 (3C2A) Saddleback defeated No. 4 (3C2A) San Diego Mesa, 30–27 (Merrill Douglas Stadium, San Diego, California)
- Week 11
  - No. 2 (D3) Louisburg defeated No. 5 (D3) Nassau, 52–21 (Alexandria City Football Field, Alexandria, Virginia)
- Week 12
  - No. 2 (D1) Iowa Western defeated No. 5 (D1) Butler (KS), 23–17 (BG Products Veterans Sports Complex, El Dorado, Kansas)

=== Conference playoffs ===
- MCAC playoffs
  - No. 3 (D3) NDSCS defeated No. 5 (D3) Mesabi Range, 22–15 (Rochester Regional Stadium, Rochester, Minnesota)

=== Postseason ===
- NJCAA Division I Semifinal
  - No. 1 (D1) Hutchinson defeated No. 4 (D1) Northwest Mississippi, 28–7 (Gowans Stadium, Hutchinson, Kansas)
  - No. 2 (D1) Iowa Western defeated No. 3 (D1) Trinity Valley, 29–7 (Titan Stadium, Council Bluffs, Iowa)
- NJCAA Division I Championship
- Red Grange Bowl (NJCAA Division III Championship)

== NJCAA Division III team wins over NJCAA Division I teams ==
Date	Time	Visting team	Home team	Site	TV	Result	Attendance	Ref.
August 22	1:00 p.m.	(D1) Highland (KS)	No. 1 DuPage	Bjarne Ullsvik Stadium • Glen Ellyn, Illinois		34–32		
September 19	3:00 p.m.	(D1) Central Georgia Tech	No. 2 Louisburg	South Pointe High School • Rock Hill, South Carolina		35–28		
^{#}Rankings from NJCAA Poll released prior to game.

== Upsets ==
This section lists unranked teams defeating NJCAA or 3C2A-ranked teams during the season.

=== Regular season ===
- Week 1
- Week 2
- Week 3
- Week 4
- Week 5
- Week 6
- Week 7
- Week 8
- Week 9
- Week 10
- Week 11
- Week 12

== Conference standings ==
=== NJCAA Division I ===
2026 Georgia Collegiate Athletic Association football standings
	Conf.			Overall
Team	W		L	W		L
Central Georgia Tech +	1	–	1	7	–	2
No. 10 Georgia Military +	1	–	1	7	–	2
+ – Conference co-champions; As of November 22, 2026; Rankings from NJCAA Division I poll

2026 Mississippi Association of Community Colleges Conference football standings
	Conf.			Overall
Team	W		L	W		L
North Division
No. 4 Northwest Mississippi xy$^	6	–	0	9	–	3
No. 7 East Mississippi	4	–	2	8	–	2
Itawamba	3	–	3	6	–	4
Northeast Mississippi	3	–	3	5	–	5
Mississippi Delta	3	–	3	4	–	6
Coahoma	1	–	5	1	–	9
Holmes	1	–	5	1	–	9
South Division
No. 9 Hinds xy	5	–	1	7	–	4
No. 8 Mississippi Gulf Coast	4	–	2	8	–	2
No. 13 Copiah–Lincoln	4	–	2	7	–	3
No. 15 East Central (MS)	4	–	2	6	–	4
Jones (MS)	3	–	3	5	–	5
Pearl River	1	–	5	3	–	7
Southwest Mississippi	0	–	6	1	–	9
Championship: Northwest Mississippi 33, Hinds 29
$ – Conference champion; x – Division champion/co-champions; y – Championship game participant; ^ – NJCAA Division I playoff participant; As of November 22, 2026; Rankings from NJCAA Division I poll

2026 Iowa Community College Athletic Conference football standings
	Conf.			Overall
Team	W		L	W		L
No. 2 Iowa Western $^	2	–	0	10	–	1
No. 12 Iowa Central	1	–	1	6	–	4
Ellsworth	0	–	2	2	–	9
$ – Conference champion; ^ – NJCAA Division I playoff participant; As of November 22, 2026; Rankings from NJCAA Division I poll

2026 Southwest Junior College Football Conference standings
	Conf.			Overall
Team	W		L	W		L
No. 3 Trinity Valley †y$^	8	–	0	9	–	2
No. 6 Navarro †y	6	–	2	7	–	4
No. 11 Tyler †	4	–	4	6	–	4
Cisco	3	–	4	3	–	5
Snow †	3	–	5	4	–	5
Blinn	2	–	5	4	–	5
New Mexico Military	2	–	5	4	–	5
Kilgore	2	–	5	3	–	6
Championship: Trinity Valley 28, Navarro 24
$ – Conference champion; † – Conference playoff participant; y – Championship game participant; ^ – NJCAA Division I playoff participant; As of November 22, 2026; Rankings from NJCAA Division I poll

2026 Kansas Jayhawk Community College Conference football standings
	Conf.			Overall
Team	W		L	W		L
No. 1 Hutchinson $^	6	–	0	12	–	0
No. 5 Butler (KS)	5	–	1	7	–	3
No. 14 Dodge City	3	–	3	6	–	5
Garden City	3	–	3	5	–	6
Coffeyville	3	–	3	4	–	6
Highland (KS)	1	–	5	2	–	9
Independence	0	–	6	0	–	10
$ – Conference champion; ^ – NJCAA Division I playoff participant; As of November 22, 2026; Rankings from NJCAA Division I poll

2026 NJCAA Division I independents football records
	Conf.			Overall
Team	W		L	W		L
Northeastern Oklahoma A&M		–		5	–	5
As of November 22, 2026; Rankings from NJCAA Division I poll

=== NJCAA Division III ===
2026 Minnesota College Athletic Conference football standings
	Conf.			Overall
Team	W		L	W		L
No. 4 NDSCS †y$	5	–	1	9	–	1
Mesabi Range †y	4	–	1	6	–	3
Minnesota State C&T †	4	–	2	5	–	3
Vermilion †	1	–	4	2	–	8
Central Lakes †	1	–	4	1	–	7
Rochester C&T †	1	–	4	1	–	7
Minnesota West C&T *	0	–	0	0	–	1
Championship: NDSCS 22, Mesabi Range 15
$ – Conference champion; † – Conference playoff participant; y – Championship game participant; * – Minnesota West C&T canceled its season on September 10.; As of November 22, 2026; Rankings from NJCAA Division III poll

2026 NJCAA Division III independents football records
	Conf.			Overall
Team	W	L	T	W		L		T
No. 2 Louisburg ^		–		9	–	1	–	0
No. 3 Erie		–		9	–	2	–	0
No. 1 DuPage ^		–		8	–	2	–	0
Hudson Valley		–		7	–	3	–	0
No. 5 Nassau		–		6	–	4	–	0
Hocking		–		2	–	8	–	1
Sussex County		–		2	–	7	–	0
Salem		–		1	–	7	–	0
^ – Red Grange Bowl participant; As of November 22, 2026; Rankings from NJCAA Division III poll

=== 3C2A ===
==== SCFA ====
2026 American Metro League standings
	Conf.			Overall
Team	W		L	W		L
Antelope Valley $	5	–	0	9	–	3
Victor Valley	4	–	1	7	–	4
Desert	3	–	2	6	–	4
Los Angeles Southwest	2	–	3	3	–	7
Los Angeles Valley	1	–	4	2	–	9
Compton *	0	–	5	0	–	10
$ – Conference champion; * – Compton canceled its season on October 19.; As of November 22, 2026; Rankings from 3C2A poll

2026 American Pacific League standings
	Conf.			Overall
Team	W		L	W		L
No. 25 San Bernardino Valley $	5	–	0	11	–	1
Grossmont	4	–	1	7	–	4
Santa Monica	3	–	2	7	–	4
Glendale (CA)	2	–	3	5	–	6
West Los Angeles	1	–	4	4	–	7
Pierce *	0	–	5	0	–	10
$ – Conference champion; * – Pierce canceled its season on August 4; As of November 22, 2026; Rankings from 3C2A poll

2026 National Central League standings
	Conf.			Overall
Team	W		L	W		L
No. 7 Golden West $^	5	–	1	8	–	3
No. 13 Cerritos	4	–	2	8	–	3
No. 16 Pasadena City	4	–	2	8	–	3
No. 15 Fullerton	4	–	2	7	–	4
No. 18 Bakersfield	3	–	3	6	–	5
College of the Canyons	1	–	5	2	–	8
East Los Angeles	0	–	6	0	–	10
$ – Conference champion; ^ – 3C2A playoff participant; As of November 22, 2026; Rankings from 3C2A poll

2026 National Northern League standings
	Conf.			Overall
Team	W		L	W		L
No. 3 Mt. San Antonio $^	7	–	0	9	–	2
No. 12 Ventura	5	–	2	7	–	4
No. 23 Allan Hancock	4	–	3	5	–	5
Citrus	4	–	3	4	–	6
Long Beach City	3	–	4	3	–	7
Moorpark	3	–	4	3	–	7
Santa Ana	2	–	5	3	–	7
Santa Barbara City	0	–	7	0	–	10
$ – Conference champion; ^ – 3C2A playoff participant; As of November 22, 2026; Rankings from 3C2A poll

2026 National Southern League standings
	Conf.			Overall
Team	W		L	W		L
No. 2 Saddleback +^	6	–	1	10	–	1
No. 4 Riverside City +^	6	–	1	9	–	2
No. 8 Southwestern (CA) ^	5	–	2	10	–	2
No. 6 San Diego Mesa ^	5	–	2	9	–	3
No. 17 Chaffey	3	–	4	6	–	5
El Camino	1	–	6	3	–	7
Mt. San Jacinto	1	–	6	3	–	7
Palomar	1	–	6	3	–	7
+ – Conference co-champions; ^ – 3C2A playoff participant; As of November 22, 2026; Rankings from 3C2A poll

==== NCFC ====
2026 American Golden Coast League standings
	Conf.			Overall
Team	W		L	W		L
Shasta $	5	–	0	10	–	1
Hartnell	4	–	1	6	–	5
Coalinga	3	–	2	6	–	5
Merced	2	–	3	3	–	7
Cabrillo	1	–	4	2	–	8
Gavilan	0	–	5	0	–	10
$ – Conference champion; As of November 22, 2026; Rankings from 3C2A poll

2026 American Pacific 7 League standings
	Conf.			Overall
Team	W		L	W		L
Feather River +	4	–	1	9	–	2
Los Medanos +	4	–	1	8	–	3
College of the Siskiyous +	4	–	1	8	–	3
Chabot	2	–	3	5	–	5
San Joaquin Delta	1	–	4	5	–	5
Contra Costa	0	–	5	1	–	9
+ – Conference co-champions; As of November 22, 2026; Rankings from 3C2A poll

2026 National Bay 6 League standings
	Conf.			Overall
Team	W		L	W		L
No. 1 San Mateo $^	5	–	0	10	–	1
No. 21 Foothill	4	–	1	7	–	4
No. 24 CC of San Francisco	3	–	2	5	–	5
De Anza	1	–	4	3	–	7
San Jose City	1	–	4	2	–	8
Santa Rosa	1	–	4	2	–	8
$ – Conference champion; ^ – 3C2A playoff participant; As of November 22, 2026; Rankings from 3C2A poll

2026 National Norcal League standings
	Conf.			Overall
Team	W		L	W		L
No. 5 Sierra $^	5	–	0	9	–	2
No. 9 Butte ^	4	–	1	9	–	3
No. 14 Diablo Valley ^	3	–	2	7	–	4
No. 20 College of the Redwoods	2	–	3	6	–	5
Laney	1	–	4	4	–	6
American River	0	–	5	1	–	9
$ – Conference champion; ^ – 3C2A playoff participant; As of November 22, 2026; Rankings from 3C2A poll

2026 National Valley League standings
	Conf.			Overall
Team	W		L	W		L
No. 11 Fresno City +^	4	–	1	8	–	4
No. 10 Modesto +^	4	–	1	7	–	4
No. 19 College of the Sequoias	3	–	2	7	–	4
No. 22 Monterey Peninsula	3	–	2	6	–	5
Sacramento City	1	–	4	2	–	8
Reedley	0	–	5	1	–	9
+ – Conference co-champions; ^ – 3C2A playoff participant; As of November 22, 2026; Rankings from 3C2A poll

== Rankings ==
=== Preseason polls ===
==== NJCAA DI ====
Rank	Team
1	Iowa Western (8)
2	Hutchinson (2)
3	Northwest Mississippi
4	Tyler
5	Mississippi Gulf Coast
6	Georgia Military
7	Trinity Valley
8	Coffeyville
9	Copiah–Lincoln
10	Garden City
11	East Mississippi
12	Navarro
13	Snow
14	Butler (KS)
15	Iowa Central

==== NJCAA DIII ====
Rank	Team
1	DuPage (6)
2	NDSCS
3	Louisburg
4	Erie
5	Rochester C&T

==== 3C2A ====
Rank	Team
1	San Mateo (12)
2	Golden West (1)
3	Modesto
4	Saddleback
5	Mt. San Antonio
6	Ventura
7	Diablo Valley
8	Cerritos
9	Fresno City
T–10	El Camino
T–10	Fullerton
12	Butte
13	CC of San Francisco
14	Riverside City
15	College of the Sequoias
16	Southwestern (CA)
17	Foothill
18	Pasadena City
19	Citrus
20	American River
21	Feather River
22	Monterey Peninsula
23	Sierra
24	Victor Valley
25	San Diego Mesa

=== 3C2A final regular season rankings ===
Rank	Team	W–L	Conference and standing	Bowl game
1	San Mateo Bulldogs (10)	9–1	National Bay 6 League champions	NCFC semifinal
2	Saddleback Bobcats (1)	9–1	National Southern League co-champions	SCFA semifinal
3	Mt. San Antonio Mounties (2)	9–1	National Northern League champions	SCFA quarterfinal
4	Riverside City Tigers (2)	9–1	National Southern League co-champions	SCFA semifinal
5	Sierra Wolverines	9–1	National Norcal League champions	NCFC semifinal
6	San Diego Mesa Olympians	8–2	National Southern League third place (tie)	SCFA quarterfinal
7	Golden West Rustlers	8–2	National Central League champions	SCFA quarterfinal
8	Southwestern Jaguars	8–2	National Southern League third place (tie)	SCFA quarterfinal
9	Butte Roadrunners	7–3	National Norcal League second place	NCFC quarterfinal
10	Modesto Pirates	7–3	National Valley League champion (tie)	NCFC quarterfinal
11	Fresno City Rams	7–3	National Valley League champion (tie)	NCFC quarterfinal
12	Ventura Pirates	7–3	National Northern League second place	Pacific Coast Bowl
13	Cerritos Falcons	7–3	National Central League second place (tie)	Golden State Bowl
14	Diablo Valley Vikings	7–3	National Norcal League third place	NCFC quarterfinal
15	Fullerton Hornets	6–4	National Central League second place (tie)	West Coast Bowl
16	Pasadena City Lancers	7–3	National Central League second place (tie)	Pacific Coast Bowl
17	Chaffey Panthers	6–4	National Southern League fifth place	Golden State Bowl
18	Bakersfield Renegades	6–4	National Central League fifth place	West Coast Bowl
19	College of the Sequoias Giants	6–4	National Valley League third place (tie)	Pepsi Sequoia Bowl
20	College of the Redwoods Corsairs	6–4	National Norcal League fourth place	Pepsi Sequoia Bowl
21	Foothill Owls	6–4	National Bay 6 League second place	Gridiron Classic Bowl
22	Monterey Peninsula Lobos	6–4	National Valley League third place (tie)	Gridiron Classic Bowl
23	Allan Hancock Bulldogs	5–5	National Northern League third place (tie)	None
24	City College of San Francisco Rams	5–5	National Bay 6 League third place	None
25	San Bernardino Valley Wolverines	9–1	American Pacific League champions	American Pacific Bowl

== Conference playoffs ==
=== NJCAA Division I ===
==== SWJCFC playoffs ====
Semifinals; October 31; Campus sites
1	Trinity Valley	30
4	Snow	14
3	Tyler	25
2	Navarro	28

SWJCFC Championship; November 7 Bruce Field—Athens, TX
1	Trinity Valley	28
2	Navarro	24

=== NJCAA Division III ===
==== MCAC playoffs ====
Quarterfinals; October 25; Campus sites
3	NDSCS	24
6	Rochester C&T	6
4	Vermilion	23
5	Central Lakes	20

Semifinals; November 1 Campus sites
2	Minnesota State C&T	12
3	NDSCS	20
1	Mesabi Range	62
4	Vermilion	12

MCAC Championship; November 8 Rochester Regional Stadium—Rochester, MN
3	NDSCS	22
1	Mesabi Range	15

== Postseason ==
=== Playoffs ===
The NJCAA announced the schedules for the Division I and Division III playoffs on November 17, 2025. This is the third consecutive season the NJCAA Division I championship was held at West Texas A&M University's Bain–Schaeffer Buffalo Stadium, after previously being held at Catholic High School for Boys' War Memorial Stadium in Little Rock, Arkansas.

==== NJCAA Division I ====
Semifinals; November 20/21; Campus sites
1	Hutchinson	28
4	Northwest Mississippi	7
3	Trinity Valley	7
2	Iowa Western	29

Championship game December 6 Bain–Schaeffer Buffalo Stadium—Canyon, TX
1	Hutchinson
2	Iowa Western

==== Red Grange Bowl ====
Championship game December 5 Bjarne Ullsvik Stadium—Glen Ellyn, IL
1	DuPage
2	Louisburg

==== 3C2A State Championship ====
The 3C2A announced the playoff brackets on November 8, 2026.

===== SCFA =====
Quarterfinals; November 14; Campus sites
3	Mt. San Antonio	35
6	Southwestern (CA)	42
5	Golden West	22
4	San Diego Mesa	26

Semifinals; November 21; Campus sites
2	Riverside City	24
6	Southwestern (CA)	31
1	Saddleback	38
4	San Diego Mesa	14

SCFA Championship; November 28
6	Southwestern (CA)
1	Saddleback

===== NCFC =====
Quarterfinals; November 14; Campus sites
3	Butte	21
6	Modesto	6
5	Fresno City	48
4	Diablo Valley	19

Semifinals; November 21; Campus sites
2	Sierra	17
3	Butte	27
1	San Mateo	31
5	Fresno City	7

NCFC Championship; November 28
3	Butte
1	San Mateo

===== Championship =====
State Championship; December 12; NorCal Champ

=== Bowls ===
==== 3C2A ====
Non-3C2A Playoff Games
Date	Game	Site	Teams	Affiliations	Results
November 14	American Division Championship Bowl	Campus sites	Feather River (8–2); Shasta (10–0)	NCFC	Feather River 31; Shasta 24
November 14	Golden State Bowl	Campus sites	Coalinga (6–4); Los Medanos (7–3)	NCFC	Los Medanos 38; Coalinga 35
November 14	Gridiron Classic Bowl	Campus sites	Monterey Peninsula (6–4); Foothill (6–4)	NCFC	Foothill 42; Monterey Peninsula 35
November 14	Northern California Bowl	Campus sites	Hartnell (6–4); College of the Siskiyous (8–2)	NCFC	College of the Siskiyous 38; Hartnell 14
November 14	Pepsi Sequoia Bowl	Campus sites	Redwoods (6–4); College of the Sequoias (7–3)	NCFC	College of the Sequoias 38; Redwoods 24
November 14	American Metro Bowl	Campus sites	Grossmont (7–3); Antelope Valley (8–2)	SCFA	Antelope Valley 49; Grossmont 6
November 14	American Pacific Bowl	Campus sites	Santa Monica (7–3); San Bernardino Valley (9–1)	SCFA	San Bernardino Valley 35; Santa Monica 10
November 14	Golden State Bowl	Campus sites	Chaffey (6–4); Cerritos (7–3)	SCFA	Cerritos 42; Chaffey 41
November 14	Pacific Coast Bowl	Campus sites	Pasadena City (7–3); Ventura (7–3)	SCFA	Pasadena City 33; Ventura 13
November 14	SoCal Bowl	Campus sites	Glendale (5–5); Victor Valley (6–4)	SCFA	Victor Valley 31; Glendale 20
November 14	West Coast Bowl	Campus sites	Bakersfield (6–4); Fullerton (6–4)	SCFA	Fullerton 42; Bakersfield 28
November 21	American Championship Bowl	Campus sites	Antelope Valley (9–2); San Bernardino Valley (10–1)	SCFA	San Bernardino Valley 34; Antelope Valley 7

== Coaching changes ==
=== Preseason and in-season ===
This is restricted to coaching changes that took place on or after May 1, 2026, and will include any changes announced after a team's last regularly scheduled games but before its playoff games.

School	Outgoing coach	Date	Reason	Replacement	Previous position
Fresno City	Tony Caviglia	May 26, 2026	Retired	Josh Brown	Sacramento State co-defensive coordinator (2024–25)
Santa Ana	Simon Fuentes (interim)	June 26, 2026	Permanent replacement	Kevin Clune	Cal Poly linebackers coach (2024–25)
East Mississippi	Buddy Stephens	August 31, 2026	Fired	Preston Rice (interim)	East Mississippi offensive coordinator (2025)
Ellsworth	Matt White	September 10, 2026	Fired	Chris Bonta (interim)	Ellsworth defensive coordinator (2026)

== See also ==
- 2026 NCAA Division I FBS football season
- 2026 NCAA Division I FCS football season
- 2026 NCAA Division II football season
- 2026 NCAA Division III football season
- 2026 NAIA football season
- 2026 U Sports football season
