= John Featherstone =

American football coach (1949–2021)

Biographical details
- Born: May 7, 1949; Los Angeles, California, U.S.
- Died: March 20, 2021 (aged 71); Redondo Beach, California, U.S.
- Education: San Diego State University (1970, 1973)

Playing career
- 1967–1968: El Camino
- 1969–1970: San Diego State
- Position: Wide receiver

Coaching career (HC unless noted)
- 1971: San Diego State (GA)
- 1972–1975: Grossmont (QB/WR)
- 1976–1978: San Diego Mesa (OC/WR)
- 1979: Grossmont (assistant)
- 1980–1981: San Diego State (WR)
- 1982 (spring): California (WR)
- 1982–1984: Santa Ana (OC/WR)
- 1985–2015: El Camino

Head coaching record
- Overall: 212–100–1 (Note: El Camino finished the 2010 season with a 6–4 but had to forfeit four wins due to an ineligible player.) (Note: El Camino finished the 2012 season with a 4–6 but had to forfeit one win due to an ineligible player.)
- Bowls: 8–6
- Tournaments: 1–0 (CCCAA playoffs); 5–5 (SCFA playoffs)

Accomplishments and honors

Championships
- 1 CCCAA (2006); 1 junior college national (1987); 1 SCFA (2006); 1 SCC (1987); 6 Mission Conference North Division (1988–1990, 1992, 1996, 2000); Mission Conference National Division (2005); Mission Conference American Division (2007); NNC (2008)

Awards
- ACCFCA Coach of the Year (2006); El Camino Hall of Fame (2005); Mission Conference Coach of the Year (1988)

John Barton Featherstone (May 7, 1949 – March 20, 2021) was an American junior college football coach. He was the head football coach for El Camino College from 1985 to 2015. With the Warriors, he helped lead the team to two national titles in 1987 and 2006. He also coached for San Diego State, Grossmont, San Diego Mesa, California, and Santa Ana. He played college football for El Camino and San Diego State as a wide receiver.

In 2006, Featherstone was named ACCFCA Coach of the Year.

== Personal life and honors ==
Featherstone died on March 20, 2021, from Alzheimer's disease.

El Camino College's Murdock Stadium was renamed to Featherstone Field in honor of Featherson.

== Head coaching record ==
Year	Team	Overall	Conference	Standing	Bowl/playoffs
El Camino Warriors (Pac-9 Conference) (1985)
1985	El Camino	5–5	4–4	T–4th	
El Camino Warriors (South Coast Conference) (1986–1987)
1986	El Camino	4–6	3–4	T–5th	
1987	El Camino	11–0	7–0	1st	W PONY Bowl
El Camino Warriors (Mission Conference) (1988–2007)
1988	El Camino	9–1–1	4–0	1st (North)	W PONY Bowl
1989	El Camino	10–1	9–0	1st (North)	L Orange County Bowl
1990	El Camino	9–2	4–0	1st (North)	W Orange County Bowl
1991	El Camino	6–4	5–3	2nd (North)	
1992	El Camino	8–3	3–1	T–1st (North)	L Southern California Bowl
1993	El Camino	2–8	1–3	T–4th (North)	
1994	El Camino	9–2	5–1	2nd (North)	L Southern California Bowl
1995	El Camino	7–4	4–2	T–2nd (North)	L Western State Bowl
1996	El Camino	8–3	4–1	T–1st (North)	W Orange County Bowl
1997	El Camino	8–3	4–1	2nd (North)	W Cerritos Strawberry Bowl
1998	El Camino	7–4	2–3	4th (North)	L South Bay Classic
1999	El Camino	8–3	4–1	2nd (North)	W South County Bowl
2000	El Camino	9–2	4–1	T–1st (North)	W CHIPS For Kids Bowl
2001	El Camino	5–5	2–3	T–3rd (North)	
2002	El Camino	3–7	2–3	T–4th (North)	
2003	El Camino	8–3	3–2	3rd (National)	W Southern California Bowl
2004	El Camino	8–2	3–2	T–2nd (National)	L Western State Bowl
2005	El Camino	11–1	5–0	1st (National)	W National Bowl, L SFCA Semifinal
2006	El Camino	12–2	4–1	2nd (National)	W American Bowl, W SCFA Championship, W CCCAA Championship
2007	El Camino	8–2	4–0	1st (American)	L American Bowl
El Camino Warriors (National Central Conference) (2008–present)
2008	El Camino	10–2	5–1	T–1st	W American Bowl, L SCFA Semifinal
2009	El Camino	8–3	4–2	3rd	L Beach Bowl
El Camino Warriors (National Northern Conference) (2010–2011)
2010	El Camino	2–8	2–3	2nd	
2011	El Camino	8–3	3–2	T–2nd	L National Bowl
El Camino Warriors (National Northern Conference / League) (2012–2015)
2012	El Camino	3–7	2–4	5th	
2013	El Camino	5–5	3–3	4th	
2014	El Camino	3–7	1–5	6th	
2015	El Camino	3–7	2–4	5th	
El Camino:		212–100–1	108–54		
Total:		212–100–1			
National championship Conference title Conference division title or championship game berth
