= Drew Dallas =

American football coach (born c. 1986)

Current position
- Title: Head coach
- Team: Hutchinson
- Conference: KJCCC
- Record: 60–6

Biographical details
- Born: c. 1986 (age 39–40)
- Education: Kansas Wesleyan University (2009); Angelo State University (2013)

Playing career
- 2004–2005: Fort Hays State
- 2006–2008: Kansas Wesleyan
- Position: Quarterback

Coaching career (HC unless noted)
- 2009–2010: Kansas Wesleyan (QB/WR)
- 2011: Angelo State (TE)
- 2012–2015: Angelo State (WR)
- 2016–2018: Angelo State (OC/WR)
- 2019: Hutchinson (AHC/OC/TE)
- 2020–present: Hutchinson

Head coaching record
- Overall: 60–6
- Bowls: 1–0
- Tournaments: 4–3 (NJCAA D-I playoffs); 1–0 (NJCAA playoffs)

Accomplishments and honors

Championships
- 2 NJCAA National (2020, 2024); 5 KJCCC (2020, 2022–2025)

Awards
- ACCFCA Coach of the Year (2022); 3× KJCCC Coach of the Year (2020, 2022–2023)

Andrew Dallas (born c. 1986) is an American college football coach. He is the head football coach for Hutchinson Community College, a position he has held since 2020. In his first season, he helped lead the Blue Dragons to an NJCAA Championship despite the COVID-19 shortened spring season. He also coached for Kansas Wesleyan and Angelo State. He played college football for Fort Hays State and Kansas Wesleyan as a quarterback.

In 2022, Dallas was named ACCFCA Coach of the Year.

== Personal life ==
Dallas' father, Dave, was the head football coach for Rolla High School, Graceland University, Ottawa University, Kansas Wesleyan University, and North County High School.

== Head coaching record ==
Year	Team	Overall	Conference	Standing	Bowl/playoffs	NJCAA DI^{#}
Hutchinson Blue Dragons (Kansas Jayhawk Community College Conference) (2020–present)
2020–21	Hutchinson	8–0	6–0	1st	W NJCAA Championship	1
2021	Hutchinson	9–2	5–2	T–3rd	W Salt City Bowl	
2022	Hutchinson	11–1	6–0	1st	L NJCAA Division I Championship	2
2023	Hutchinson	10–1	6–0	1st	L NJCAA Division I Semifinal	3
2024	Hutchinson	11–1	5–1	T–1st	W NJCAA Division I Championship	1
2025	Hutchinson	11–1	6–0	1st	L NJCAA Division I Championship	2
Hutchinson:		60–6	34–3			
Total:		60–6				
National championship Conference title Conference division title or championship game berth
