= 2024 junior college football season =

American junior college football season

- National Championship: Red Grange Bowl, Glen Ellyn, IL, (NJCAA D-III)
- Champion(s): Hutchinson (NJCAA D-I); DuPage (NJCAA D-III); San Mateo (3C2A)

The 2024 junior college football season was the season of intercollegiate junior college football running from September to December 2024. The season ended with three national champions: two from the National Junior College Athletic Association's (NJCAA) Division I and Division III and one from the California Community College Athletic Association (3C2A).

The NJCAA Division I champion was Hutchinson, which defeated Iowa Western, 28–23, in the NJCAA National Football Championship. The NJCAA Division III champion was DuPage, which beat Louisburg, 31–14, in the Red Grange Bowl. The C23A champion was San Mateo, which bested Mt. San Antonio, 43–11, in the 3C2A State Championship.

== Conference standings ==
=== NJCAA Division I ===
2024 Georgia Collegiate Athletic Association football standings
	Conf.			Overall
Team	W		L	W		L
No. 3 Georgia Military $	2	–	0	10	–	2
Central Georgia Tech	1	–	1	10	–	1
Andrew	0	–	2	5	–	2
$ – Conference champion; Rankings from NJCAA Division I poll

2024 Iowa Community College Athletic Conference football standings
	Conf.			Overall
Team	W		L	W		L
No. 2 Iowa Western $^	2	–	0	11	–	2
Iowa Central	1	–	1	6	–	6
Ellsworth	0	–	2	1	–	10
$ – Conference champion; ^ – NJCAA Division I playoff participant; Rankings from NJCAA Division I poll

2024 Kansas Jayhawk Community College Conference football standings
	Conf.			Overall
Team	W		L	W		L
No. 1 Hutchinson +^	5	–	1	11	–	1
No. 8 Coffeyville +	5	–	1	9	–	3
No. 12 Butler (KS) +	5	–	1	7	–	4
No. 15 Dodge City	3	–	3	6	–	4
Highland (KS)	1	–	5	5	–	6
Independence	1	–	5	3	–	8
Garden City	1	–	5	1	–	10
+ – Conference co-champions; ^ – NJCAA Division I playoff participant; Rankings from NJCAA Division I poll

2024 Mississippi Association of Community Colleges Conference football standings
	Conf.			Overall
Team	W		L	W		L
North Division
No. 4 Northwest Mississippi x†y$^	5	–	0	9	–	2
No. 13 Holmes †	4	–	2	7	–	3
Itawamba	4	–	2	6	–	3
No. 14 East Mississippi	4	–	2	5	–	4
Northeast Mississippi	2	–	4	3	–	6
Mississippi Delta	1	–	5	2	–	7
Coahoma	0	–	5	0	–	8
South Division
No. 9 Mississippi Gulf Coast x†	5	–	1	8	–	2
No. 10 East Central (MS) x†y	5	–	1	8	–	3
Copiah–Lincoln	3	–	3	5	–	4
Jones (MS)	3	–	3	5	–	4
Pearl River	2	–	4	4	–	5
Hinds	2	–	4	2	–	7
Southwest Mississippi	1	–	5	1	–	8
Championship: Northwest Mississippi 34, East Central 7
$ – Conference champion; x – Division champion/co-champions; † – Conference playoff participant; y – Championship game participant; ^ – NJCAA Division I playoff participant; Rankings from NJCAA Division I poll

2024 Northeast Football Conference standings
	Conf.			Overall
Team	W		L	W		L
No. 11 Lackawanna $	2	–	0	7	–	3
Monroe	0	–	2	5	–	5
$ – Conference champion; Rankings from NJCAA Division I poll

2024 Southwest Junior College Football Conference standings
	Conf.			Overall
Team	W		L	W		L
No. 5 Navarro †y$^	7	–	2	9	–	2
No. 7 Tyler †y	7	–	2	7	–	4
Kilgore †	4	–	4	6	–	4
Cisco †	4	–	4	4	–	5
Trinity Valley	3	–	4	5	–	4
Blinn	2	–	5	4	–	5
Northeastern Oklahoma A&M	2	–	5	3	–	6
New Mexico Military	2	–	5	3	–	6
Championship: Navarro 31, Tyler 28
$ – Conference champion; † – Conference playoff participant; y – Championship game participant; ^ – NJCAA Division I playoff participant; Rankings from NJCAA Division I poll

2024 NJCAA Division I independents football records
	Conf.			Overall
Team	W	L	T	W		L		T
No. 6 Snow		–		9	–	2	–	0
Community Christian (CA)		–		3	–	3	–	0
Sussex County		–		3	–	6	–	0
Community Christian (MI)		–		2	–	7	–	2
Rankings from NJCAA Division I poll

=== NJCAA Division III ===
2024 Minnesota College Athletic Conference football standings
	Conf.			Overall
Team	W		L	W		L
No. 3 NDSCS †y$	6	–	0	9	–	2
Rochester C&T †	4	–	2	5	–	5
Mesabi Range †y	3	–	3	4	–	4
Minnesota State C&T †	3	–	3	4	–	5
Vermilion †	3	–	3	3	–	4
Central Lakes †	1	–	5	1	–	5
Minnesota West C&T †	1	–	5	1	–	7
Championship: NDSCS 30, Mesabi Range 29
$ – Conference champion; † – Conference playoff participant; y – Championship game participant; Rankings from NJCAA Division III poll

2024 NJCAA Division III independents football records
	Conf.			Overall
Team	W		L	W		L
No. 1 DuPage ^		–		11	–	1
No. 4 Hudson Valley		–		8	–	2
No. 2 Louisburg ^		–		8	–	3
No. 5 Erie		–		6	–	4
Nassau		–		3	–	7
Hocking		–		1	–	9
^ – Red Grange Bowl participant; Rankings from NJCAA Division III poll

=== 3C2A ===
==== SCFA ====
2024 American Metro League standings
	Conf.			Overall
Team	W		L	W		L
Chaffey +	4	–	1	8	–	3
Victor Valley +	4	–	1	4	–	6
Santa Ana	3	–	2	8	–	3
West Los Angeles	2	–	3	4	–	6
Desert	2	–	3	2	–	8
Compton	0	–	5	0	–	10
+ – Conference co-champions

2024 American Pacific League standings
	Conf.			Overall
Team	W		L	W		L
Pasadena City $	5	–	0	11	–	0
Santa Monica	3	–	2	6	–	4
Los Angeles Southwest	3	–	2	6	–	5
Glendale (CA)	2	–	3	6	–	4
Los Angeles Valley	2	–	3	4	–	6
Pierce	0	–	5	3	–	7
$ – Conference champion

2024 National Central League standings
	Conf.			Overall
Team	W		L	W		L
Mt. San Antonio $^	7	–	0	12	–	1
Golden West	6	–	1	9	–	2
Long Beach City	5	–	2	6	–	5
Cerritos	4	–	3	5	–	5
Citrus	3	–	4	5	–	5
Orange Coast	2	–	5	2	–	8
East Los Angeles	1	–	6	2	–	8
San Bernardino Valley	0	–	7	0	–	10
$ – Conference champion; ^ – 3C2A playoff participant

2024 National Northern League standings
	Conf.			Overall
Team	W		L	W		L
El Camino $^	6	–	1	7	–	4
College of the Canyons	5	–	2	8	–	3
Ventura	5	–	2	8	–	3
Allan Hancock	4	–	3	6	–	5
Bakersfield	4	–	3	6	–	5
Moorpark	2	–	5	4	–	6
Santa Barbara City	2	–	5	3	–	7
Antelope Valley	0	–	7	0	–	10
$ – Conference champion; ^ – 3C2A playoff participant

2024 National Southern League standings
	Conf.			Overall
Team	W		L	W		L
Riverside City $^	7	–	0	10	–	2
Saddleback	5	–	2	8	–	3
San Diego Mesa ^	5	–	2	8	–	3
Mt. San Jacinto	4	–	3	6	–	5
Fullerton	3	–	4	5	–	5
Palomar	3	–	4	4	–	6
Southwestern (CA)	1	–	6	2	–	8
Grossmont	0	–	7	1	–	9
$ – Conference champion; ^ – 3C2A playoff participant

==== NCFC ====
2024 American Golden Coast League standings
	Conf.			Overall
Team	W		L	W		L
Monterey Peninsula $	6	–	0	11	–	0
San Jose City	5	–	1	9	–	2
Coalinga	4	–	2	6	–	5
Cabrillo	3	–	3	3	–	7
Merced	2	–	4	2	–	8
Hartnell	1	–	5	2	–	8
Gavilan	0	–	6	1	–	9
$ – Conference champion

2024 American Pacific 7 League standings
	Conf.			Overall
Team	W		L	W		L
De Anza $	5	–	0	10	–	1
College of the Siskiyous	4	–	1	7	–	4
College of the Redwoods	3	–	2	8	–	3
Chabot	1	–	4	4	–	6
Los Medanos	1	–	4	4	–	6
Yuba	0	–	3	0	–	8
$ – Conference champion

2024 National Bay 6 League standings
	Conf.			Overall
Team	W		L	W		L
San Mateo $^	5	–	0	12	–	1
Foothill	4	–	1	7	–	4
CC of San Francisco	3	–	2	3	–	7
Diablo Valley	2	–	3	6	–	5
Laney	1	–	4	4	–	7
San Joaquin Delta	0	–	5	0	–	11
$ – Conference champion; ^ – 3C2A playoff participant

2024 National Norcal League standings
	Conf.			Overall
Team	W		L	W		L
American River $^	5	–	0	7	–	4
Butte	4	–	1	10	–	1
Sierra	3	–	2	6	–	5
Shasta	2	–	3	4	–	6
Feather River	1	–	4	1	–	9
Santa Rosa	0	–	5	2	–	8
$ – Conference champion; ^ – 3C2A playoff participant

2024 National Valley League standings
	Conf.			Overall
Team	W		L	W		L
Modesto $^	4	–	0	9	–	3
Fresno City ^	3	–	1	8	–	3
College of the Sequoias	2	–	2	6	–	5
Reedley	1	–	3	4	–	7
Sacramento City	0	–	4	4	–	6
$ – Conference champion; ^ – 3C2A playoff participant

== See also ==
- 2024 NCAA Division I FBS football season
- 2024 NCAA Division I FCS football season
- 2024 NCAA Division II football season
- 2024 NCAA Division III football season
- 2024 NAIA football season
- 2024 U Sports football season
