= 2026 junior college football rankings =

Rankings for the 2026 junior college football season

- Season: 2026
- Postseason: Single-elimination

The 2026 junior college football rankings are conducted on a week-to-week basis and based on the NJCAA Division I, NJCAA Division III, and the 3C2A. The 3C2A poll is released by the Junior College Athletic Bureau's Fred Baer.

== Legend ==
	Increase in ranking
	Decrease in ranking
	Not ranked previous week or no change
	Selected for playoffs
(#–#)	Win–loss record
(Italics)	Number of first place votes
т	Tied with team above or below also with this symbol

== NJCAA Division I poll ==
	Preseason August 17	Week 1 August 24	Week 2 August 31	Week 3 September 8	Week 4 September 14	Week 5 September 21	Week 6 September 29	Week 7 October 5	Week 8 October 13	Week 9 October 19	Week 10 October 26	Week 11 November 2	
1.	Iowa Western (8)												1.
2.	Hutchinson (2)												2.
3.	Northwest Mississippi												3.
4.	Tyler												4.
5.	Mississippi Gulf Coast												5.
6.	Georgia Military												6.
7.	Trinity Valley												7.
8.	Coffeyville												8.
9.	Lincoln–Copiah												9.
10.	Garden City												10.
11.	East Mississippi												11.
12.	Navarro												12.
13.	Snow												13.
14.	Butler (KS)												14.
15.	Iowa Central												15.
	Preseason August 17	Week 1 August 24	Week 2 August 31	Week 3 September 8	Week 4 September 14	Week 5 September 21	Week 6 September 29	Week 7 October 5	Week 8 October 13	Week 9 October 19	Week 10 October 26	Week 11 November 2	
		None	None	None	None	None	None	None	None	None	None	None	

== NJCAA Division III poll ==
	Preseason August 17	Week 1 August 24	Week 2 August 31	Week 3 September 8	Week 4 September 14	Week 5 September 21	Week 6 September 29	Week 7 October 5	Week 8 October 13	Week 9 October 19	Week 10 October 26	Week 11 November 2	
1.	DuPage (6)												1.
2.	NDSCS												2.
3.	Louisburg												3.
4.	Erie												4.
5.	Rochester C&T												5.
	Preseason August 17	Week 1 August 24	Week 2 August 31	Week 3 September 8	Week 4 September 14	Week 5 September 21	Week 6 September 29	Week 7 October 5	Week 8 October 13	Week 9 October 19	Week 10 October 26	Week 11 November 2	
		None	None	None	None	None	None	None	None	None	None	None	

== 3C2A poll ==
	Preseason August 25	Week 1 September 1	Week 2 September 8	Week 3 September 15	Week 4 September 22	Week 5 September 29	Week 6 October 13	Week 7 October 20	Week 8 October 27	Week 9 November 3	
1.	San Mateo (12)										1.
2.	Golden West (1)										2.
3.	Modesto										3.
4.	Saddleback										4.
5.	Mt. San Antonio										5.
6.	Ventura										6.
7.	Diablo Valley										7.
8.	Cerritos										8.
9.	Fresno City										9.
10.	El Camino т										10.
11.	Fullerton т										11.
12.	Butte										12.
13.	CC of San Francisco										13.
14.	Riverside City										14.
15.	College of the Sequoias										15.
16.	Southwestern (CA)										16.
17.	Foothill										17.
18.	Pasadena City										18.
19.	Citrus										19.
20.	American River										20.
21.	Feather River										21.
22.	Monterey Peninsula										22.
23.	Sierra										23.
24.	Victor Valley										24.
25.	San Diego Mesa										25.
	Preseason August 25	Week 1 September 1	Week 2 September 8	Week 3 September 15	Week 4 September 22	Week 5 September 29	Week 6 October 13	Week 7 October 20	Week 8 October 27	Week 9 November 3	
		None	None	None	None	None	None	None	None	None	
