= Eric Issendorf =

American football coach

Biographical details
- Born: c. 1974 (age 51–52); Hawley, Minnesota, U.S.
- Education: North Dakota State University (B.S. 2001; M.S. 2013)

Playing career
- 1992–1993: NDSCS
- Position: Linebacker

Coaching career (HC unless noted)
- 1993: NDSCS (SA)
- 1995: NDSCS (SA)
- 2000–2001: North Dakota State (SA)
- 2005–2009: Fargo South HS (DL)
- 2010–2014: Fargo South HS (DC/LB)
- 2015–2017: Concordia (MN) (DL)
- 2018–2025: NDSCS

Head coaching record
- Overall: 62–14

Accomplishments and honors

Championships
- 3 MCAC regular season (2021, 2023, 2024); 3 MCAC playoffs (2022, 2024, 2025)

Eric Issendorf (born c. 1974) is an American college football coach. He served as head football coach at North Dakota State College of Science (NDSCS) from 2018 to 2025, compiling a record of 62–14. He played football at NDSCS as a linebacker. Issendorf resigned from his coaching position at NDSCS following the 2025 season, and was succeeded by Mark Kennedy.

== Head coaching record ==
Year	Team	Overall	Conference	Standing	Bowl/playoffs	NJCAA DIII^{#}
NDSCS Wildcats (Minnesota College Athletic Conference) (2018–2025)
2018	NDSCS	9–2	4–1	2nd (Western)	L MCAC Championship Game	
2019	NDSCS	8–2	4–0	1st (Western)	L MCAC Semifinal	
2020–21	No team—COVID-19					
2021	NDSCS	9–1	7–0	1st	L MCAC Semifinal	4
2022	NDSCS	9–2	5–1	2nd	L Red Grange Bowl	2
2023	NDSCS	8–3	4–1	2nd	L MCAC Championship Game	3
2024	NDSCS	9–2	6–0	1st	L Game One Bowl	3
2025	NDSCS	10–2	5–1	2nd	L Red Grange Bowl	2
NDSCS:		62–14	35–4			
Total:		62–14				
National championship Conference title Conference division title or championship game berth
