= Garrett Campbell =

American football coach (born c. 1977)

Biographical details
- Born: c. 1977 (age 48–49)
- Education: Fullerton College (1995); California State University, Fullerton (1998); Northern State University (2002)

Playing career
- 1995–1996: Fullerton
- Positions: Quarterback, wide receiver

Coaching career (HC unless noted)
- 1997–1999: Fullerton (assistant)
- 2000: Northern State (GA)
- 2001: Willamette (assistant)
- 2002–2003: Menlo (OC)
- 2004–2007: Carthage (OC)
- 2008–2015: Illinois College
- 2016–2018: Fullerton (OC)
- 2019–2023: Fullerton

Head coaching record
- Overall: 51–30 (college); 31–13 (junior college)
- Bowls: 0–1 (junior college)
- Tournaments: 0–1 (NCAA D-III playoffs); 1–2 (SCFA playoffs)

Accomplishments and honors

Championships
- 1 MWC South Division (2014); 2 NSL (2022–2023)

Garrett Campbell (born c. 1977) is an American college football coach. He was the head football coach for Illinois College from 2008 to 2015 and Fullerton College from 2019 to 2023. He also coached for Northern State, Willamette, Menlo, and Carthage. He played college football for Fullerton as a quarterback and wide receiver.

== Head coaching record ==
=== College ===
Year	Team	Overall	Conference	Standing	Bowl/playoffs
Illinois College Blueboys (Midwest Conference) (2008–2015)
2008	Illinois College	4–6	4–5	T–5th	
2009	Illinois College	5–5	5–4	T–4th	
2010	Illinois College	5–5	5–4	T–5th	
2011	Illinois College	9–2	8–1	2nd	L NCAA Division III First Round
2012	Illinois College	8–2	7–2	T–3rd	
2013	Illinois College	8–2	7–2	T–2nd	
2014	Illinois College	7–3	5–0	1st (South)	
2015	Illinois College	5–5	3–2	T–2nd (South)	
Illinois College:		51–30	44–20		
Total:		51–30			
National championship Conference title Conference division title or championship game berth

=== Junior college ===
Year	Team	Overall	Conference	Standing	Bowl/playoffs	CCCAA/3C2A^{#}
Fullerton Hornets (National Central League) (2019–2020)
2019	Fullerton	5–5	3–2	T–2nd		T21
2020–21	No team—COVID-19					
Fullerton Hornets (National Southern League) (2021–2023)
2021	Fullerton	6–5	3–2	T–2nd	L Patriotic Bowl	
2022	Fullerton	10–2	5–0	1st	L SCFA Regional	4
2023	Fullerton	10–1	7–0	1st	L SCFA Semifinal	5
Fullerton:		31–13	18–4			
Total:		31–13				
National championship Conference title Conference division title or championship game berth
