= Kurt Taufa'asau =

American football coach (born 1990)

Current position
- Title: Head coach
- Team: New Mexico Highlands
- Conference: RMAC
- Record: 8–14

Biographical details
- Born: September 18, 1990 (age 36); Pago Pago, American Samoa
- Education: University of Wyoming (2012)

Playing career
- 2009: New Mexico Military
- 2010–2012: Wyoming
- 2013: Oakland Raiders*
- 2013: Tennessee Titans*
- 2013: Indianapolis Colts*
- Position: Defensive tackle

Coaching career (HC unless noted)
- 2015: Westlake HS (UT) (DL)
- 2016–2018: New Mexico Military (DL)
- 2019–2020: New Mexico Military (AHC/DL)
- 2021–2023: New Mexico Military
- 2024–present: New Mexico Highlands

Head coaching record
- Overall: 8–14 (college); 27–10 (junior college)
- Bowls: 1–1 (junior college)
- Tournaments: 2–0 (NJCAA D-I playoffs); 2–0 (SWJCFC playoffs)

Accomplishments and honors

Championships
- 1 NJCAA Division I (2021); 1 SWJCFC (2021)

Awards
- First-team All-WSFL (2009)

Kurt Taufa'asau (born September 18, 1990) is an American college football coach. He is the head football coach for New Mexico Highlands University, a position he has held since 2024. He was the head football coach for New Mexico Military Institute from 2021 to 2023. In 2021, he led New Mexico Military to a NJCAA National Football Championship win. He also coached for Westlake High School.

Taufa'asau played college football for New Mexico Military and Wyoming as a defensive tackle. After going undrafted in the 2013 NFL draft he signed with the Oakland Raiders of the National Football League (NFL). He also had stints with the Tennessee Titans and Indianapolis Colts.

== Head coaching record ==
=== College ===
Year	Team	Overall	Conference	Standing	Bowl/playoffs
New Mexico Highlands Cowboys (Rocky Mountain Athletic Conference) (2024–present)
2024	New Mexico Highlands	2–9	2–7	T–7th	
2025	New Mexico Highlands	6–5	4–5	6th	
2026	New Mexico Highlands	0–0	0–0		
New Mexico Highlands:		8–14	6–12		
Total:		8–14			

=== Junior college ===
Year	Team	Overall	Conference	Standing	Bowl/playoffs	D1^{#}
New Mexico Military Broncos (Southwest Junior College Football Conference) (2021–2023)
2021	New Mexico Military	12–1	6–1	1st	W NJCAA Division I Championship	1
2022	New Mexico Military	9–3	5–2	T–2nd	W HF Sinclair Wool	7
2023	New Mexico Military	6–6	4–3	T–4th	L Xcel Energy Wool	
New Mexico Military:		27–10	15–7			
Total:		27–10				
National championship Conference title Conference division title or championship game berth
