= Mark Kennedy (American football) =

American football coach

Current position
- Title: Head coach
- Team: NDSCS
- Conference: MCAC
- Record: 9–1

Biographical details
- Born: c. 1983 (age 42–43)
- Education: Minot State University (B.S. 2011)

Playing career
- 2006–2009: Minot State
- Positions: Fullback, defensive lineman

Coaching career (HC unless noted)

Football
- 2010–2011: Minot State (RB)
- 2012–2015: Berthold HS (ND) (assistant)
- 2016–2021: Surrey HS (ND)
- 2022: Minot HS (HS) (assistant)
- 2023–2024: Williston HS (ND)
- 2025: NDSCS (OL)
- 2026–present: NDSCS

Track and field
- 2022: Minot HS (HS)

Head coaching record
- Overall: 9–1 (junior college football); 34–39 (high school football)
- Tournaments: Football; 3–0 (MCAC playoffs); 2–5 (NDHSAA)

Accomplishments and honors

Championships
- Football; 1 MCAC (2026)

Awards
- Football; 2× NDHSAA Region Coach of the Year (2020-2021)

Mark Kennedy is an American football coach. He is the head football coach at North Dakota State College of Science (NDSCS), a position he has held since December 2025.

Kennedy played college football at Minot State University in Minot, North Dakota. He was the head football coach Surrey High School in Surrey, North Dakota, from 2016 to 2021, and Williston High School in Williston, North Dakota, from 2023 to 2024. Kennedy was an offensive line coach at NDSCS in 2025 before succeeding Eric Issendorf as head coach.

== Head coaching record ==
=== High school football ===
Year	Team	Overall	Conference	Standing	Bowl/playoffs
Surrey Mustangs (North Dakota High School Activities Association) (2016–2021)
2016	Surrey	2–6	1–5	6th	
2017	Surrey	4–5	3–3	4th	L NDHSAA Class 9-Man Round 1
2018	Surrey	7–3	7–3	3rd	L NDHSAA Class 9-Man Round 2
2019	Surrey	5–4	4–3	4th	L NDHSAA Class 9-Man Round 1
2020	Surrey	7–2	6–1	1st	L NDHSAA Class 9-Man Round 1
2021	Surrey	7–3	2–0	1st	L NDHSAA Class 9-Man Quarterfinal
Surrey:		32–23	23–15		
Williston Coyotes (North Dakota High School Activities Association) (2023–2024)
2023	Williston	2–7	1–4	10th	
2024	Williston	0–9	0–5	6th	
Williston:		2–16	1–9		
Total:		34–39			
National championship Conference title Conference division title or championship game berth

=== Junior college football ===
Year	Team	Overall	Conference	Standing	Bowl/playoffs
NDSCS Wildcats (Minnesota College Athletic Conference) (2026–present)
2026	NDSCS	9–1	4–1	T–1st	W MCAC championship
NDSCS:		9–1	4–1		
Total:		9–1			
National championship Conference title Conference division title or championship game berth
