= Gateway Cities =

Region of Los Angeles County, California, US

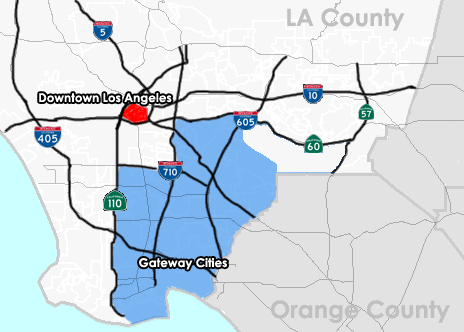
The Gateway Cities, shaded in blue (the boundary is generalized)

The Gateway Cities region, or Southeast Los Angeles County, is an urbanized region located in southeastern Los Angeles County, California, between the City of Los Angeles proper, Orange County, and the Pacific Ocean. The cluster of cities has been termed "Gateway Cities" in that they serve as a "gateway" between LA and Orange counties, with the city of Cerritos equidistant from Downtown L.A., Long Beach, and Santa Ana in Orange County. As such, the area is central to the Los Angeles-Long Beach-Anaheim, CA Metropolitan Statistical Area (MSA), and has a population of approximately 2,000,000 residents. Southeast Los Angeles County comprises some of the most densely populated municipalities in the United States.

The Gateway Cities Council of Governments (GCCOG), the coordinating body for the Southeast LA Region, is located in the city of Paramount.

== Cities of Southeast LA ==
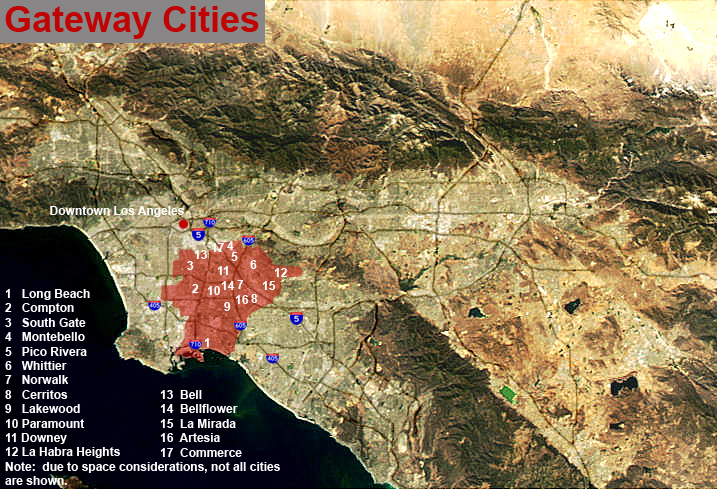
Gateway Cities

Area residents generally identify as being part of urban Los Angeles, despite technically living in separate, independent municipalities. The following cities are members of the Gateway Cities Council of Governments, though these cities at times may also be considered part of other LA regions, including the San Gabriel Valley Region, East Los Angeles Region, the South Los Angeles Region, the Southeast LA (or SELA) region, and the Los Angeles Harbor Region.

- Artesia
- Bell
- Bell Gardens
- Bellflower
- Cerritos
- Commerce
- Compton
- Cudahy
- Downey
- Hawaiian Gardens
- Huntington Park
- La Habra Heights
- La Mirada
- Lakewood
- Long Beach
- Lynwood
- Maywood
- Montebello
- Norwalk
- Paramount
- Pico Rivera
- Santa Fe Springs
- Signal Hill
- South Gate
- Vernon
- Whittier

Also members of the Gateway Cities Council of Governments:

- Avalon (on Catalina Island)
- Los Angeles County
- Port of Long Beach
- City of Industry

== Higher education ==
=== Universities ===
The region hosts the following colleges and universities:

| Institution | Location | Founded | Type | Enrollment | Shorthand | Nickname | Primary Conference | Division |
|---|---|---|---|---|---|---|---|---|
| Biola University | La Mirada | 1901 | Private | 4,011 | Biola | Eagles | Pacific West Conference | NCAA Division II |
| California State University, Long Beach | Long Beach | 1949 | Public | 37,776 | Cal State Long Beach | 49ers | Big West Conference | NCAA Division I |
| Whittier College | Whittier | 1887 | Private | 2,259 | Whittier | Poets | Southern California Intercollegiate Athletic Conference | NCAA Division III |
| Southern California University of Health Sciences | Whittier | 1911 | Private Graduate | 469 | SCU | None | - | - |

=== Community colleges ===
| Institution | Location | Founded | Enrollment | Nickname | Primary Conference | Division |
|---|---|---|---|---|---|---|
| Cerritos College | Norwalk | 1955 | 22,731 | Falcons | South Coast Conference | CCCAA |
| Compton College | Compton | 1927 | 7,018 | Tartars | South Coast Conference | CCCAA |
| Long Beach City College | Long Beach | 1927 | 24,650 | Vikings | South Coast Conference | CCCAA |
| Rio Hondo College | Whittier | 1963 | 19,948 | Roadrunners | South Coast Conference | CCCAA |

== Infrastructure ==
=== Air ===
Southeast LA County's Long Beach Airport (LGB) provides Southeast LA regular direct flights to and from approximately a dozen cities in the Western United States.

=== Sea and heavy rail ===
The Port of Long Beach, located in Southeast LA, is the second busiest port in the United States, Significant freight rail infrastructure runs through Vernon, Commerce, Industry, Santa Fe Springs, and Pico Rivera; as well as lines running between the Port of Long Beach and Vernon & Commerce.

=== Commuter and light rail ===
The LA Metro connects Southeast LA County to Greater Los Angeles via the following commuter and light rail lines:

- A Line (formerly the "Blue Line"), connecting to downtown Los Angeles and the San Gabriel Valley
- C Line (formerly the "Green Line"), connecting to LAX and the Beach Cities
- Southeast Gateway Line (planned and funded under Measure M)

=== Freeways ===
Given its high population, Southeast LA is noticeably crisscrossed with regional freeway infrastructure, connecting it to other parts of Greater Los Angeles, Orange County, and the Inland Empire. The following freeways directly service Southeast LA County:

- Interstate 5 also known as the Santa Ana Freeway
- Interstate 405 also known as the San Diego Freeway
- Interstate 605 also known as the San Gabriel River Freeway
- Interstate 105 also known as the Glenn Andersen Freeway
- Interstate 710 also known as the Long Beach Freeway
- Interstate 110 also known as the Harbor Freeway
- California State Route 91 also known as the Artesia Freeway
- California State Route 60 also known as the Pomona Freeway
- California State Route 22 also known as the 7th Street Extension
- California State Route 1 Pacific Coast Highway also known as the Pacific Coast Highway
