= Pac-9 Conference =

Junior college athletic conference in Southern California

The Pac-9 Conference was a football-only junior college athletic conference with member schools located in Southern California. The conference was formed as a superconference of nine schools drawn from two conference. Bakersfield College, El Camino College, Long Beach City College, Pasadena City College, and Taft College had competed in the Metropolitan Conference. Cerritos College, Fullerton College, Golden West College, and Mt. San Antonio College had been members of the South Coast Conference. The Pac-9 Conference was short-lived, operating for only two seasons, in 1984 and 1985. Fullerton and Taft were co-champions of the conference in 1984.

== Yearly standings ==
1984 Pac-9 Conference football standings
	Conf.					Overall
Team	W		L		T	W		L		T
Fullerton +	7	–	1	–	0	10	–	1	–	0
Taft +	7	–	1	–	0	10	–	1	–	0
Pasadena	6	–	2	–	0	7	–	4	–	0
Cerritos	5	–	3	–	0	6	–	3	–	0
Bakersfield	3	–	5	–	0	5	–	5	–	0
El Camino	3	–	5	–	0	5	–	5	–	0
Golden West	2	–	6	–	0	4	–	6	–	0
Long Beach	2	–	6	–	0	4	–	6	–	0
Mt. San Antonio	1	–	7	–	0	2	–	8	–	0
+ – Conference co-champions

1985 Pac-9 Conference football standings
	Conf.					Overall
Team	W		L		T	W		L		T
Fullerton $	7	–	1	–	0	8	–	3	–	0
Taft	6	–	1	–	1	7	–	2	–	1
Cerritos	5	–	2	–	1	6	–	2	–	1
El Camino	4	–	4	–	0	5	–	5	–	0
Golden West	4	–	4	–	0	4	–	5	–	1
Pasadena	4	–	4	–	0	4	–	6	–	0
Bakersfield	3	–	5	–	0	5	–	5	–	0
Long Beach	1	–	6	–	1	1	–	8	–	1
Mt. San Antonio	0	–	7	–	1	2	–	7	–	1
$ – Conference champion
