= 2021 New Mexico Military Broncos football team =

American college football season

2021 New Mexico Military Broncos football

NJCAA Division I champion

NJCAA championship game, W 31–12 vs. Iowa Western
- Conference: Southwest Junior College Football Conference
- Record: 12–1 (6–1 SWJCFC)
- Head coach: Kurt Taufa'asau (1st season)
- Home stadium: Wool Bowl

2021 Southwest Junior College Football Conference standings
	Conf.			Overall
Team	W		L	W		L
No. 1 New Mexico Military †y$^	6	–	1	12	–	1
No. 12 Tyler †y	5	–	3	7	–	5
Kilgore †	4	–	4	5	–	5
Trinity Valley	3	–	4	5	–	4
Blinn †	3	–	4	5	–	5
Navarro	3	–	4	5	–	5
Cisco	3	–	4	4	–	5
Northeastern Oklahoma A&M	2	–	4	4	–	5
Championship: New Mexico Military 45, Tyler 10
$ – Conference champion; † – Conference playoff participant; y – Championship game participant; ^ – NJCAA Division I playoff participant

The 2021 New Mexico Military Broncos football team was an American football team that represented the New Mexico Military Institute as a member of the Southwest Junior College Football Conference (SWJCFC) during the 2021 junior college football season. In their first year under head coach Kurt Taufa'asau, the Broncos compiled a 12–1 record (6–1 in conference games), defeated Iowa Western in the National Junior College Athletic Association (NJCAA) Division I championship game, and won the NJCAA National Football Championship.

== Schedule ==
Date	Time	Opponent	Site	Result	Attendance	Source
September 4		Papago*	Wool Bowl; Roswell, NM	W 40–9		
September 11		Maricopa*	Wool Bowl; Roswell, NM	W 66–0		
September 18		at Navarro	Tiger Stadium; Corsicana, TX	W 39–31		
September 25		at Kilgore	Wool Bowl; Roswell, NM	W 37–26		
October 2		at Blinn	Cub Stadium; Brenham, TX	W 28–18		
October 16		Tyler	Wool Bowl; Roswell, NM	W 49–13		
October 23		Cisco	Wool Bowl; Roswell, NM	L 19–38		
October 30		at Northeastern Oklahoma A&M	Red Robertson Field; Miami, OK	W 17–7		
November 6		Trinity Valley	Wool Bowl; Roswell, NM	W 58–28		
November 13		Blinn*	Wool Bowl; Roswell, NM (SWJCFC semifinal)	W 48–0		
November 20		Tyler*	Wool Bowl; Roswell, NM (SWJCFC championship)	W 45–10		
December 5	2:00 p.m.	Northwest Mississippi*	Wool Bowl; Roswell, NM (NJCAA Division I semifinal)	W 49–30		
December 17		vs. Iowa Western*	War Memorial Stadium; Little Rock, AR (NJCAA Division I national championship)	W 31–13		
*Non-conference game; All times are in Mountain time
