= Ed Goddard =

American football player (1914–1992)

No. 7, 28
- Positions: Quarterback, Halfback

Personal information
- Born: October 28, 1914; San Diego, California, U.S.
- Died: July 20, 1992 (aged 77); San Marcos, California, U.S.
- Listed height: 5 ft 10 in (1.78 m)
- Listed weight: 183 lb (83 kg)

Career information
- High school: Escondido (Escondido, California)
- College: Washington State (1933-1936)
- NFL draft: 1937: 1st round, 2nd overall pick

Career history

Playing
- Brooklyn Dodgers (1937); Cleveland Rams (1937–1938)

Coaching
- Fullerton (1940–1941) Head coach; Fullerton (1946–1947) Head coach

Awards and highlights
- Pro Bowl (1938); 3× First-team All-American (1934, 1935, 1936); 2× First-team All-PCC (1935, 1936); Second-team All-PCC (1934)

Career NFL statistics
- Rushing yards: 146
- Rushing average: 1.5
- Receptions: 12
- Receiving yards: 189
- Total touchdowns: 3
- Stats at Pro Football Reference

Head coaching record
- Career: 33–20–4 (.614)

Edwin Vinson Goddard (October 28, 1914 – July 20, 1992) was an American professional football player and coach. Goddard played college football at the quarterback and halfback positions for Washington State University. Goddard also served as a punter for Washington State. He was named a first-team All-American quarterback three straight years from 1934 to 1937 and was a consensus All-American quarterback in 1935 and 1936. He was the second player selected in the 1937 NFL draft and played two years of professional football for the Brooklyn Dodgers (1937) and Cleveland Rams (1937–1938).

Goddard was known as the "Escondido Express," as he grew up in Escondido, California. He reportedly received the nickname from a Los Angeles Times reporter who saw him running and passing against USC, helping Washington State win against USC for the first time in three years.

During World War II, Goddard served in the military. He and his wife, Ellen Goddard, had two children. Goddard died of cancer at his home in July 1992 at age 77.

== Head coaching record ==
Year	Team	Overall	Conference	Standing	Bowl/playoffs
Fullerton Hornets (Eastern Conference) (1940–1941)
1940	Fullerton	7–2	3–2	2nd	
1941	Fullerton	7–2	3–2	2nd	
Fullerton Hornets (Eastern Conference) (1946–1949)
1946	Fullerton	3–4–2	2–1–2	2nd	
1947	Fullerton	7–3	3–2	3rd	
1948	Fullerton	7–2–1	4–2	3rd	
1949	Fullerton	2–7–1	1–4–1	T–5th	
Fullerton:		33–20–4	16–13–3		
Total:		33–20–4			
