= Middle Georgia Technical College =

Coordinates: 32°32′43″N 83°40′3″W

- Type: Community Technical College
- Active: 1973–2013
- Location: Warner Robins, Georgia, USA
- Mascot: Titans
- Website: http://www.middlegatech.edu

Middle Georgia Technical College was a unit of the Technical College System of Georgia (TCSG) and provided education services for a four-county service area in middle Georgia. The school's service area included Houston, Peach, Pulaski, and Dooly counties. MGTC is accredited by the Commission on Colleges of the Southern Association of Colleges and Schools to award associate degrees, Diplomas, and Technical Certificates of Credit. Many of the school's individual technical programs were also accredited by their respective accreditation organizations.

On September 26, 2012, the State Board of the TCSG voted to merge Middle Georgia Technical College with the Macon-based Central Georgia Technical College in order to cut costs. The new college retained the name Central Georgia Technical College and will cover 11 counties in the Central Georgia region with multiple campuses (CGTC services students in Baldwin, Bibb, Crawford, Jones, Monroe, Putnam, and Twiggs counties), a region larger than the U.S. state of Delaware. Classes under the new college commenced July 1, 2013.

== History ==
MGTC was originally established in 1973 as Houston Vocational Center, though the first classes were not held until January, 1974. At that time, its mission was to provide vocational educational programs to both secondary and post-secondary students. The school transitioned to an all-post-secondary curriculum in 1985, at which time its name was changed to Houston Area Vocational Center and its service area was expanded to the four-county area that it currently serves.

Oversight of the school was transferred from local authorities to the Technical College System of Georgia (then called the State Board for Post-secondary Vocational Education) in January, 1986, and a year later the school was renamed to Middle Georgia Technical Institute.

The school was named the official service provider for Adult Literacy programs in its four-county service area in 1990, which led to the opening of Adult Literacy Centers in all four counties. In 1993, the Georgia General Assembly also approved funding to build a new main campus for the school on an 83-acre (340,000 m^{2}) site in Houston County, which was completed and occupied by March, 1998.

== Locations and programs ==
MGTC's primary campus was located at 80 Cohen Walker Dr. in Warner Robins, and extended classroom facilities are also located at the Robins AFB Museum of Aviation. From the main and extended campuses, the school offered associate degree, diploma, and technical certificate of credit programs, adult education services, continuing education, and customized business and industry workforce training. Additional training was also provided at four auxiliary locations in Warner Robins, Hawkinsville, and Vienna. The Adult Education Programs utilized multiple locations throughout the four counties served by the school.

== Athletics ==
MGTC sponsored intercollegiate men's and women's basketball teams. The school's teams were nicknamed the Titans, and participated in Division III of the National Junior College Athletic Association (NJCAA) and the Georgia Collegiate Athletic Association (GCAA) conference.
