= 2024 Hutchinson Blue Dragons football team =

American college football season

2024 Hutchinson Blue Dragons football

NJCAA Division I champion KJCCC champion

NJCAA championship game, W 28–23 vs. Iowa Western
- Conference: Kansas Jayhawk Community College Conference
- Record: 11–1 (5–1 KJCCC)
- Head coach: Drew Dallas (5th season)
- Offensive coordinator: Tony Koehling (2nd season)
- Defensive coordinator: Matt Wallerstedt (1st season)
- Home stadium: Gowans Stadium

2024 Kansas Jayhawk Community College Conference football standings
	Conf.			Overall
Team	W		L	W		L
No. 1 Hutchinson +^	5	–	1	11	–	1
No. 8 Coffeyville +	5	–	1	9	–	3
No. 12 Butler (KS) +	5	–	1	7	–	4
No. 15 Dodge City	3	–	3	6	–	4
Highland (KS)	1	–	5	5	–	6
Independence	1	–	5	3	–	8
Garden City	1	–	5	1	–	10
+ – Conference co-champions; ^ – NJCAA Division I playoff participant; Rankings from NJCAA Division I poll

The 2024 Hutchinson Blue Dragons football team was an American football team that represented Hutchinson Community College as a member of the Kansas Jayhawk Community College Conference (KJCCC) during the 2024 junior college football season. Led by fifth-year head coach Drew Dallas, the Blue Dragons compiled an 11–1 record, defeated Iowa Western in the National Junior College Athletic Association (NJCAA) championship game, and won the NJCAA National Football Championship. It was Hutchinson's second national championship of all time, both under Dallas.

The team's statistical leaders included Samari Collier with 1,373 passing yards, Waymond Jordan Jr. with 1,612 rushing yards, Tre Brown with 566 receiving yards, and Nestus Burger with 87 points scored (63 extra points, eight field goals).

Against Ellsworth, Hutchinson tied the all-time NJCAA team scoring record as they beat the Panthers 99–0.

== Schedule ==
Date	Opponent	Site	TV	Result	Attendance	Source
August 29	New Mexico Military*	Gowans Stadium; Hutchinson, KS	ESPN+	W 42–10	1,200	
September 7	at Iowa Western*	Titan Stadium; Council Bluffs, IA		W 38–37	3,000	
September 14	Iowa Central*	Gowans Stadium; Hutchinson, KS		W 33–30 ^{(OT)}	1,200	
September 28	Ellsworth*	Gowans Stadium; Hutchinson, KS		W 99–0	1,100	
October 5	Dodge City	Gowans Stadium; Hutchinson, KS		W 42–0	250	
October 12	at Independence	Shulthis Stadium; Independence, KS		W 48–7		
October 19	at Coffeyville	Veterans Memorial Stadium; Coffeyville, KS		W 40–17		
October 26	Butler (KS)	Gowans Stadium; Hutchinson, KS		L 22–27	2,100	
November 9	Highland (KS)	Gowans Stadium; Hutchinson, KS		W 44–0	800	
November 16	at Garden City	Broncbuster Stadium; Garden City, KS		W 42–17		
December 8	at Georgia Military*	Davenport Field; Milledgeville, GA (NJCAA Division I semifinal)		W 63–21	1,600	
December 18	vs. Iowa Western*	Bain–Schaeffer Buffalo Stadium; Canyon, TX (NJCAA Division I championship game)		W 28–23	1,286	
*Non-conference game
