= Matthew White =

Matthew White or Matt White is the name of:

== Entertainment ==
- Matthew White (countertenor) (born 1973), Canadian opera singer
- Matt White (musician) (born 1980), American singer-songwriter
- Matthew E. White (born 1982), American singer-songwriter, producer, and founder of Spacebomb Records

== Sports ==
- Matthew White (basketball) (1957–2013), American basketball player
- Matthew White (cricketer) (born 1969), English cricketer
- Matt White (cyclist) (born 1974), Australian cyclist
- Matt White (baseball, born 1977), American left-handed baseball pitcher and rock entrepreneur
- Matt White (minor league pitcher) (born 1978), American right-handed baseball pitcher
- Matthew White (rugby league) (born 1984), Australian rugby league player
- Matthew White (footballer) (born 1987), Australian-rules footballer
- Matt White (ice hockey) (born 1989), American ice hockey player
- Matthew White (racing driver), motorsport racing driver

== Other ==
- Matthew White (MP) (1766–1840), British Member of Parliament for Hythe, 1802–1806 and 1812–1818
- Matthew White (journalist) (born 1970), Australian sports presenter
