= 2021 junior college football season =

American junior college football season

- National Championship: Red Grange Bowl, Glen Ellyn, IL, (NJCAA D-III)
- Champion(s): New Mexico Military (NJCAA D-I); DuPage (NJCAA D-III); CC of San Francisco (CCCAA)

The 2021 junior college football season was the season of intercollegiate junior college football running from September to December 2021. The season ended with three national champions: two from the National Junior College Athletic Association's (NJCAA) Division I and Division III and one from the California Community College Athletic Association (CCCAA).

The NJCAA Division I champion was New Mexico Military who defeated Iowa Western 31–13 in the NJCAA National Football Championship. The NJCAA Division III champion was DuPage who defeated Nassau 34–29 in the Red Grange Bowl. The CCCAA champion was CC of San Francisco who defeated Riverside City 22–19 in the CCCAA State Championship.

== Conference standings ==
=== NJCAA Division I ===
2021 Iowa Community College Athletic Conference football standings
	Conf.			Overall
Team	W		L	W		L
No. 2 Iowa Western $^	4	–	0	10	–	1
No. 7 Iowa Central	2	–	2	9	–	2
Ellsworth	0	–	4	2	–	8
$ – Conference champion; ^ – NJCAA Division I playoff participant; Rankings from NJCAA Division I poll

2021 Northeast Football Conference standings
	Conf.			Overall
Team	W		L	W		L
No. 10 Monroe $	1	–	0	10	–	1
Lackawanna	0	–	1	7	–	3
$ – Conference champion; Rankings from NJCAA Division I poll

2021 Kansas Jayhawk Community College Conference football standings
	Conf.			Overall
Team	W		L	W		L
No. 11 Independence +	6	–	1	8	–	2
No. 15 Coffeyville +	6	–	1	6	–	3
No. 3 Hutchinson	5	–	2	9	–	2
No. 9 Garden City	5	–	2	8	–	3
Dodge City	3	–	4	3	–	6
Highland (KS)	2	–	5	2	–	7
Fort Scott	1	–	6	2	–	7
Butler (KS)	0	–	7	1	–	9
+ – Conference co-champions; Rankings from NJCAA Division I poll

2021 Southwest Junior College Football Conference standings
	Conf.			Overall
Team	W		L	W		L
No. 1 New Mexico Military †y$^	6	–	1	12	–	1
No. 12 Tyler †y	5	–	3	7	–	5
Kilgore †	4	–	4	5	–	5
Trinity Valley	3	–	4	5	–	4
Blinn †	3	–	4	5	–	5
Navarro	3	–	4	5	–	5
Cisco	3	–	4	4	–	5
Northeastern Oklahoma A&M	2	–	4	4	–	5
Championship: New Mexico Military 45, Tyler 10
$ – Conference champion; † – Conference playoff participant; y – Championship game participant; ^ – NJCAA Division I playoff participant

2021 Mississippi Association of Community and Junior Colleges football standings
	Conf.			Overall
Team	W		L	W		L
North Division
No. 6 East Mississippi x†	6	–	0	9	–	1
No. 4 Northwest Mississippi x†y$^	5	–	1	9	–	3
Mississippi Delta	3	–	3	5	–	4
Itawamba	3	–	3	4	–	5
Northeast Mississippi	3	–	3	3	–	6
Holmes	1	–	5	1	–	8
Coahoma	0	–	6	0	–	9
South Division
No. 8 Jones (MS) x†	5	–	1	8	–	2
No. 14 Mississippi Gulf Coast x	5	–	1	7	–	2
No. 13 Hinds x†y	5	–	1	9	–	3
Copiah–Lincoln	3	–	3	3	–	6
East Central (MS)	2	–	4	3	–	6
Southwest Mississippi	1	–	5	3	–	6
Pearl River	0	–	6	2	–	7
Championship: Northwest Mississippi 56, Hinds 21
$ – Conference champion; x – Division champion/co-champions; † – Conference playoff participant; y – Championship game participant; ^ – NJCAA Division I playoff participant; Rankings from NJCAA Division I poll

2021 NJCAA Division I independents football records
	Conf.			Overall
Team	W		L	W		L
No. 5 Snow ^		–		7	–	2
Georgia Military		–		6	–	5
Hocking		–		5	–	5
Sussex County		–		3	–	5
ASA Miami		–		3	–	6
^ – NJCAA Division I playoff participant; Rankings from NJCAA Division I poll

=== NJCAA Division III ===
2021 Minnesota College Athletic Conference football standings
	Conf.			Overall
Team	W		L	W		L
No. 4 NDSCS †	7	–	0	9	–	1
No. 3 Itasca †y	6	–	1	9	–	1
Rochester C&T †	3	–	3	4	–	4
No. 5 Minnesota State C&T †y	3	–	4	6	–	4
Minnesota West C&T †	3	–	4	4	–	6
Central Lakes †	3	–	4	3	–	6
Vermilion †	2	–	4	2	–	6
Mesabi Range †	0	–	7	0	–	9
Championship: canceled
† – Conference playoff participant; y – Championship game participant; The 2021 MCAC Championship was canceled due to COVID-19 concerns and no conference champion was named

2021 NJCAA Division III independents football records
	Conf.			Overall
Team	W		L	W		L
No. 1 DuPage ^		–		9	–	2
No. 2 Nassau ^		–		6	–	3
Louisburg		–		4	–	2
Hudson Valley		–		4	–	4
Erie		–		1	–	7
^ – Red Grange Bowl participate; Rankings from NJCAA Division III poll

=== CCCAA ===
==== SCFA ====
2021 American Metro League standings
	Conf.			Overall
Team	W		L	W		L
Santa Ana $	5	–	0	7	–	4
Citrus	4	–	1	6	–	4
Glendale (CA)	3	–	2	6	–	4
Orange Coast	2	–	3	3	–	7
West Los Angeles	1	–	4	3	–	7
Los Angeles Harbor	0	–	5	2	–	8
$ – Conference champion

2021 National Central League standings
	Conf.			Overall
Team	W		L	W		L
No. 2 Riverside City $^	5	–	0	10	–	3
No. 18 Cerritos	3	–	2	6	–	5
No. 14 Palomar	3	–	2	6	–	5
No. 11 Mt. San Antonio	2	–	3	8	–	3
No. 13 El Camino	2	–	3	7	–	4
Chaffey	0	–	5	0	–	10
$ – Conference champion; ^ – CCCAA playoff participant; Rankings from CCCAA poll

2021 American Mountain League standings
	Conf.			Overall
Team	W		L	W		L
Mt. San Jacinto +	4	–	1	9	–	2
No. 24 Pasadena City +	4	–	1	9	–	2
Grossmont +	4	–	1	7	–	3
Desert	2	–	3	3	–	7
Victor Valley	1	–	4	2	–	7
Compton	0	–	5	0	–	9
+ – Conference co-champions; Rankings from CCCAA poll

2021 National Northern League standings
	Conf.			Overall
Team	W		L	W		L
No. 5 Ventura $^	5	–	0	10	–	1
No. 6 College of the Canyons ^	3	–	2	8	–	3
Allan Hancock	2	–	3	5	–	5
No. 25 East Los Angeles	2	–	3	5	–	6
Long Beach City	2	–	3	4	–	6
Bakersfield	1	–	4	2	–	8
$ – Conference champion; ^ – CCCAA playoff participant; Rankings from CCCAA poll

2021 American Pacific League standings
	Conf.			Overall
Team	W		L	W		L
Antelope Valley $	5	–	0	8	–	3
Santa Barbara City	3	–	2	7	–	4
Moorpark	3	–	2	4	–	6
Los Angeles Valley	2	–	3	3	–	7
Santa Monica	1	–	3	3	–	6
Pierce	0	–	4	0	–	9
$ – Conference champion

2021 National Southern League standings
	Conf.			Overall
Team	W		L	W		L
No. 4 Golden West $^	5	–	0	11	–	1
No. 17 San Diego Mesa	3	–	2	7	–	4
No. 16 Fullerton	3	–	2	6	–	5
Saddleback	2	–	3	4	–	6
San Bernardino Valley	1	–	4	3	–	7
Southwestern (CA)	1	–	4	3	–	7
$ – Conference champion; ^ – CCCAA playoff participant; Rankings from CCCAA poll

==== NCFC ====
2021 National Bay 6 League standings
	Conf.			Overall
Team	W		L	W		L
No. 1 CC of San Francisco $^	5	–	0	13	–	0
No. 3 San Mateo ^	4	–	1	10	–	2
No. 15 Diablo Valley	3	–	2	6	–	5
No. 19 Laney	2	–	3	6	–	5
San Joaquin Delta	1	–	4	1	–	9
Chabot	0	–	5	2	–	8
$ – Conference champion; ^ – CCCAA playoff participant; Rankings from CCCAA poll

2021 American Golden Coast League standings
	Conf.			Overall
Team	W		L	W		L
Monterey Peninsula $	4	–	0	7	–	4
Merced	3	–	1	6	–	5
Hartnell	1	–	3	4	–	6
San Jose City	1	–	3	3	–	7
Gavilan	1	–	3	1	–	6
$ – Conference champion

2021 National Norcal League standings
	Conf.			Overall
Team	W		L	W		L
No. 10 Butte +	4	–	1	7	–	4
No. 9 American River +^	4	–	1	6	–	5
No. 20 Sierra	3	–	2	6	–	5
Santa Rosa	3	–	2	3	–	7
Shasta	1	–	4	4	–	6
College of the Siskiyous	0	–	5	1	–	9
+ – Conference co-champions; ^ – CCCAA playoff participant; Rankings from CCCAA poll

2021 American Pacific 7 League standings
	Conf.			Overall
Team	W		L	W		L
No. 22 Feather River $	5	–	0	10	–	0
No. 23 Contra Costa	4	–	1	10	–	1
Foothill	3	–	2	7	–	3
Los Medanos	2	–	3	4	–	6
De Anza	1	–	4	2	–	8
Yuba	0	–	5	0	–	9
$ – Conference champion; Rankings from CCCAA poll

2021 National Valley League standings
	Conf.			Overall
Team	W		L	W		L
No. 7 Fresno City +^	4	–	1	8	–	3
No. 8 Modesto +	4	–	1	8	–	3
No. 12 Reedley	3	–	2	7	–	4
No. 21 College of the Sequoias	2	–	3	6	–	5
Sacramento City	2	–	3	3	–	7
West Hills Coalinga	0	–	5	0	–	8
+ – Conference co-champions; ^ – CCCAA playoff participant; Rankings from CCCAA poll

== Postseason ==
=== Playoffs ===
==== NJCAA Division I ====
Semifinals; December 5 Campus sites
1	Iowa Western	30 (OT)
4	Snow	29
2	New Mexico Military	49
3	Northwest Mississippi	30

Championship game December 17; War Memorial Stadium—Little Rock, AR
1	Iowa Western	13
2	New Mexico Military	31

==== CCCAA ====
===== SCFA playoffs =====
Semifinals; November 27; Campus sites
1	Riverside City	41
4	Ventura	21
2	Golden West	20
3	College of the Canyons	10

Regional finals December 4 Campus sites
1	Riverside City	27
2	Golden West	23

===== NCFC playoffs =====
Semifinals; November 27; Campus sites
1	CC of San Francisco	35
4	American River	17
2	San Mateo	31
3	Fresno City	14

Regional finals December 4 Campus sites
1	CC of San Francisco	20
2	San Mateo	17

===== State championship =====
Championship game December 11; College Heights Stadium—San Mateo, CA
1	Riverside City	19
1	CC of San Francisco	22

== See also ==
- 2021 NCAA Division I FBS football season
- 2021 NCAA Division I FCS football season
- 2021 NCAA Division II football season
- 2021 NCAA Division III football season
- 2021 NAIA football season
- 2021 U Sports football season
