= Central Georgia Technical College =

Technical college in Georgia, U.S.

- Former names: Macon Area Vocational-Technical School, Macon Technical Institute, Middle Georgia Technical College
- Type: Community Technical College
- Established: 1962; 64 years ago
- President: Ivan H. Allen, Ed.D.
- Students: 11,527 (fall 2024)
- Location: Warner Robins, Georgia, U.S. 32°48′37″N 83°41′29″W
- Campus: Multiple campuses
- Colors: Burgundy and Navy
- Nickname: Titans
- Sporting affiliations: NJCAA Division I, GCAA Conference
- Website: www.centralgatech.edu

Central Georgia Technical College (CGTC) is a unit of the Technical College System of Georgia (TCSG) and provides education for an eleven-county service area in central Georgia. The school's service area includes Baldwin, Bibb, Crawford, Dooly, Houston, Jones, Monroe, Peach, Pulaski, Putnam, and Twiggs counties. CGTC is accredited by the Commission on Colleges of the Southern Association of Colleges and Schools (SACS) to award associate degrees, diplomas, and technical certificates of credit.

== History ==
CGTC was originally established in 1962 under the name "Macon Area Vocational-Technical School," though the school did not officially start holding classes until 1966. The school's initial service area was focused solely on the local Macon community, but expanded in 1990 when the school, then named Macon Technical Institute, assumed control of the Baldwin County Adult Center in Milledgeville. The Georgia General Assembly approved funding for a full campus to be constructed in Milledgeville in 1993, and construction of the facility was completed in Fall 1997. The school's current service area was formally expanded to its current size on July 6, 2000, as part of the Education Reform Act in Georgia. This act also renamed the school to its current form. After passage of this act, the school built learning centers in the remaining five counties of its seven-county service area.

On September 26, 2012, the State Board of the Technical College System of Georgia voted to merge Central Georgia Technical College and Middle Georgia Technical College. The merger of the colleges created one of the largest two-year colleges in Georgia, with an 11 county service delivery area larger than the state of Delaware.

== Locations and programs ==
CGTC's primary campuses are located in Warner Robins, Macon and Milledgeville, where associate degrees, diplomas, and technical certificates are available in a variety of programs. There are also Learning Centers in Eatonton, Forsyth, Gray, Hawkinsville, Jeffersonville, and Roberta. The learning centers offer technical certificates, continuing education courses, and learning support courses.

== Athletics ==
CGTC began its athletics program in 2010 with the launching of men's and women's basketball teams. In addition to basketball, the CGTC athletics program features men's and women's cross country teams. CGTC's teams are nicknamed the Titans, and participate in Division I of the National Junior College Athletic Association and the Georgia Collegiate Athletic Association conference.
