= Georgia Collegiate Athletic Association =

- Association: NJCAA
- Founded: 2010
- Commissioner: David Elder
- Sports fielded: 19; men's: 10; women's: 9
- No. of teams: 9
- Headquarters: Demorest, Georgia
- Region: Georgia – NJCAA Region 17
- Website: thegcaa.com

Locations

The Georgia Collegiate Athletic Association (also known as GCAA) is a college athletic conference and member of the National Junior College Athletic Association (NJCAA) in the NJCAA Region 17. Members of the GCAA include technical and community colleges in the U.S. state of Georgia.

Conference championships are held in most sports and individuals can be named to All-Conference and All-Academic teams. The conference is the successor to the Georgia Junior College Athletic Association (GJCAA), which began in 1967.

In 2010, all of the existing members of the GJCAA joined the newly organized Georgia Collegiate Athletic Association.

== Member schools ==
=== Current members ===
The GCAA currently has 9 full members, all but one are public schools:

Institution	Location (Note: All cities are located within the State of Georgia.)	Founded	Affiliation	Enrollment	Nickname	Joined
Albany Technical College	Albany	1961	Public (Note: Part of the Technical College System of Georgia.)	4,000	Titans	2010
Central Georgia Technical College	Macon	1962	Public	3,896	Titans	2010
Georgia Highlands College	Rome	1970	Public (Note: Part of the University System of Georgia.)	5,529	Chargers	2011
Georgia Military College	Milledgeville	1879	Public (Note: Military junior college.)	1,200	Bulldogs	2010
Gordon State College	Barnesville	1872	Public	4,555	Highlanders	2010
Oxford College of Emory University	Oxford	1836	Nonsectarian	753	Eagles	2010
South Georgia State College	Douglas	1906	Public	1,959	Hawks	2010
South Georgia Technical College	Americus	1948	Public	1,972	Jets	2010
Southern Crescent Technical College	Griffin	1961	Public	501	Tigers	2010

=== Former members ===
The GCAA had 16 former full members, all but two were public schools:

Institution	Location (Note: All cities are located within the State of Georgia.)	Founded	Type	Enrollment	Nickname	Joined	Left	Subsequent conference(s)	Current conference
Abraham Baldwin Agricultural College	Tifton	1908	Public (Note: Part of the University System of Georgia.)	3,284	Stallions	2010	2024	Southern States (SSAC) (Note: Currently an NAIA athletic conference.) (2024–present)	
Andrew College	Cuthbert	1854	United Methodist	496	Fighting Tigers	2010	2026	Southern States (SSAC) (2026–present)	
Atlanta Metropolitan State College	Atlanta	1965	Public	2,001	Trailblazers	2010	2020	N/A (Note: The school discontinued intercollegiate competition.)	
Chattahoochee Technical College	Marietta	1963	Public (Note: Part of the Technical College System of Georgia.)	16,000	Golden Eagles	2010	2017	N/A	
College of Coastal Georgia	Brunswick	1961	Public	3,438	Mariners	2010	2011	NAIA Independent (2011–12); Southern States (SSAC) (2012–17)	The Sun (2017–present)
Darton State College	Albany	1963	Public	N/A	Cavaliers	2010	2017 (Note: Darton State ended at the end of the 2016 fall semester, without completing the rest of the 2016–17 school year.)	N/A (Note: Closed in 2016, had since been consolidated with Albany State University.)	
East Georgia State College (Note: Currently known Georgia Southern University–East Georgia Campus since 2026.)	Swainsboro	1973	Public	1,826	Bobcats (Note: Rebranded as the Golden Eagles since 2026.)	2010	2026	NAIA Independent (2026–present)	
Georgia Northwestern Technical College	Rome	1962	Public	10,000	Bobcats	2010	2016	USCAA (2016–20)	N/A
Georgia Perimeter College	Decatur	1964	Public	N/A	Jaguars	2010	2015	N/A (Note: Closed in 2016, had been since consolidated with Georgia State University.)	
Macon State College	Macon	1968	Public	N/A	Blue Storm	2010	2013	N/A (Note: Consolidated in 2013 with Middle Georgia College to become Middle Georgia State College.)	
Middle Georgia College	Cochran	1884	Public	N/A	Warriors	2010	2013	N/A (Note: Consolidated in 2013 with Macon State College to become Middle Georgia State College.)	
Middle Georgia State College (Note: Currently known as Middle Georgia State University since 2015, with the main campus in Macon.)	Cochran	2013	Public	8,404	Knights	2013	2014	Southern States (SSAC) (2014–25)	Peach Belt (PBC) (Note: Currently an NCAA Division II athletic conference.) (2025–present)
Middle Georgia Technical College	Warner Robins	1973	Public	N/A	Titans	2010	2013	N/A (Note: Closed in 2013, has been since consolidated with Central Georgia Technical College.)	
North Georgia Technical College	Clarkesville	1944	Public	4,300	Wolves	2010	2015	N/A	
Waycross College	Waycross	1976	Public	N/A	Swamp Foxes	2010	2013	N/A (Note: Closed in 2013, has been since consolidated with South Georgia State College.)	
West Georgia Technical College	Waco	2008	Public	3,000	Golden Knights	2010	2019	N/A	
Young Harris College	Young Harris	1886	United Methodist	1,120	Mountain Lions	2010	2011	NCAA D-II Independent (2011–12); Peach Belt (PBC) (2012–23)	Carolinas (CC) (2023–present)

=== Membership timeline ===
Full member (non-football) Associate member (sport)

== Yearly football standings ==
2024 Georgia Collegiate Athletic Association football standings
	Conf.			Overall
Team	W		L	W		L
No. 3 Georgia Military $	2	–	0	10	–	2
Central Georgia Tech	1	–	1	10	–	1
Andrew	0	–	2	5	–	2
$ – Conference champion; Rankings from NJCAA Division I poll

2025 Georgia Collegiate Athletic Association football standings
	Conf.			Overall
Team	W		L	W		L
No. 5 Georgia Military $	3	–	0	10	–	1
Andrew	1	–	1	8	–	1
Central Georgia Tech	0	–	3	7	–	4
$ – Conference champion; Rankings from NJCAA Division I poll
