= Fullerton Hornets football =

College football team

- First season: 1916; 110 years ago
- Athletic director: Scott Giles
- Head coach: Phil Austin & Brian Crooks; 1st season, 3–3 (.500)
- Location: Fullerton, California
- Stadium: Sherbeck Field (capacity: 2,000)
- Conference: National Southern League
- Colors: Stinger blue and hornet yellow
- All-time record: 595–362–34 (.618)
- Bowl record: 13–9 (.591)

National championships
- Claimed: 4 (1965, 1967, 1983, 2016) (Note: Finished the 2017 season 13–0 and 5–0 in the conference but forfeited seven games, their conference title, and their national title due to CCCAA sanctions.)

Conference championships
- 27
- Mascot: Hornets
- Website: fchornets.com

The Fullerton Hornets football team represents Fullerton College in junior college football in the Southern California Football Association (SCFA). The Hornets are members of the National Southern League (NSL), fielding its team in the NSL since 2021. The Hornets play their home games at Sherbeck Field Stadium in Fullerton, California.

Their head coaches are Phil Austin and Brian Crooks, who took over the position for the 2024 season.

== Conference affiliations ==
- Independent (1916, 1921–1922, 1944)
- Southern California Junior College Conference (1927–1931)
- Orange Empire Conference / Eastern Conference (1933–1942, 1945–1967)
- South Coast Conference (1968–1983, 1986–1987)
- Pac-9 Conference (1984–1985)
- Mission Conference (1988–2007)
- National Southern Conference / League (2008–2017, 2021–present)
- National Central League (2018–2019)

== List of head coaches ==
=== Key ===
Key to symbols in coaches list
General		Overall		Conference		Postseason (Note: Although the first Rose Bowl Game was played in 1902, it has been continuously played since the 1916 game, and is recognized as the oldest bowl game by the NCAA. "—" indicates any season prior to 1916 when postseason games were not played.)	
No.	Order of coaches (Note: A running total of the number of head coaches, with coaches who served separate tenures being counted only once. Interim head coaches are represented with "Int" and are not counted in the running total. "—" indicates the team played but either without a coach or no coach is on record. "X" indicates an interim year without play.)	GC	Games coached	CW	Conference wins	PW	Postseason wins
DC	Division championships	OW	Overall wins	CL	Conference losses	PL	Postseason losses
CC	Conference championships	OL	Overall losses	CT	Conference ties	PT	Postseason ties
NC	National championships	OT	Overall ties (Note: Overtime rules in college football were introduced in 1996, making ties impossible in the period since.)	C%	Conference winning percentage		
†	Elected to the College Football Hall of Fame	O%	Overall winning percentage (Note: When computing the win–loss percentage, a tie counts as half a win and half a loss.)				

=== Coaches ===
List of head football coaches showing season(s) coached, overall records, conference records, postseason records, championships and selected awards
No.	Name	Season(s)	GC	OW	OL	OT	O%	CW	CL	CT	C%	PW	PL	PT	CC	NC	Awards
1	Albert Steulke	1916	6	1	4	1	0.250					–	–	–	–	–	–
2	L. O. Culp	1921	11	6	3	2	0.636					–	–	–	–	–	–
3	Art Nunn	1922, 1925, 1928–1935	78	35	36	7	0.494	25	21	2	0.176	–	–	–	–	–	–
4	Glenn Lewis	1926–1927	18	6	10	2	0.389	2	4	1	0.176	–	–	–	–	–	–
5	Roy Priebe	1936	10	1	8	1	0.150	0	5	1	0.176	–	–	–	–	–	–
6	Wendell Pickens	1937–1939	27	9	17	1	0.352	5	11	1	0.176	–	–	–	–	–	–
7	Ed Goddard	1940–1941, 1946–1949	57	33	20	4	0.614	16	13	3	0.176	–	–	–	–	–	–
8	Dick Spaulding	1942, 1952–1953	30	23	7	0	0.767	12	4	0	0.176	–	–	–	1	–	–
9	W. W. Bradshaw	1944	6	3	3	0	0.500					–	–	–	–	–	–
10	Lloyd Martin	1945	9	2	6	1	0.278	1	1	0	0.176	–	–	–	–	–	–
11	Tex Oliver	1950–1951	19	8	9	2	0.474	3	7	2	0.176	–	–	–	–	–	–
12	Bud Dawson	1954–1957	40	24	15	1	0.613	14	11	0	0.176	–	–	–	1	–	–
13	Oran Breeland	1958–1960	27	6	19	2	0.259	6	14	1	0.176	–	–	–	–	–	–
14	Hal Sherbeck	1961–1991	319	241	70	8	0.768	154	38	6	0.176	2	0	0	16	3	–
15	Marv Sampson & Glenn Thomas	1992	10	1	9	0	0.100	1	4	0	0.176	–	–	–	–	–	–
16	Gene Murphy	1993–2007	157	80	75	2	0.516	41	37	0	0.176	3	1	0	1	–	–
17	Tim Byrnes	2008–2018	117	82 (Note: Finished the 2018 season 10–0 and 5–0 in the conference but forfeited eight games and their conference title due to CCCAA sanctions.)	35	0	0.701	43	18	0	0.176	1	0	0	6	–	–
18	Garrett Campbell	2019–2023	44	31	13	0	0.705	18	4	0	0.176	1	2	0	2	–	–
19	Phil Austin & Brian Crooks	2024–present	6	3	3	0	0.500	1	2	0	0.333	–	–	–	–	–	–

== Year-by-year results ==
National champions	Conference champions	Bowl game berth	Playoff berth

Season	Year	Head coach	Association	Conference	Record							Postseason	Final ranking
Season	Year	Head coach	Association	Conference	Overall			Conference				Postseason	Final ranking
Season	Year	Head coach	Association	Conference	Win	Loss	Tie	Finish	Win	Loss	Tie	Postseason	Final ranking
Fullerton Hornets
1916	1916	Albert Steulke	—	Independent	1	4	1					—	—
No team from 1917 to 1920.
1921	1921	L. C. Culp	—	Independent	6	3	2					—	—
1922	1922	Art Nunn	—	Independent	0	3	0					—	—
No team from 1923 to 1924.
1925	1925	Art Nunn	—	Independent	0	4	0					—	—
1926	1926	Glenn Lewis	—	Independent	2	4	1					—	—
1927	1927	Glenn Lewis	—	Southern California Junior College Conference	4	6	1	T–5th	2	4	1	—	—
1928	1928	Art Nunn	—	Southern California Junior College Conference	5	2	1	2nd	3	1	1	—	—
1929	1929	Art Nunn	—	Southern California Junior College Conference	6	4	0	T–2nd	5	2	0	—	—
1930	1930	Art Nunn	—	Southern California Junior College Conference	3	4	1	2nd	3	2	1	—	—
1931	1931	Art Nunn	—	Southern California Junior College Conference	3	4	1	T–4th	3	3	0	—	—
1932	1932	Art Nunn	—	Orange Empire Conference / Eastern Conference	7	2	1	2nd	4	2	0	—	—
1933	1933	Art Nunn	—	Orange Empire Conference / Eastern Conference	4	4	1	5th	2	4	0	—	—
1934	1934	Art Nunn	—	Orange Empire Conference / Eastern Conference	2	6	1	6th	2	4	0	—	—
1935	1935	Art Nunn	—	Orange Empire Conference / Eastern Conference	5	3	1	T–3rd	3	3	0	—	—
1936	1936	Roy Priebe	—	Orange Empire Conference / Eastern Conference	1	8	1	7th	0	5	1	—	—
1937	1937	Wendell Pickens	—	Orange Empire Conference / Eastern Conference	2	6	0	5th	2	4	0	—	—
1938	1938	Wendell Pickens	—	Orange Empire Conference / Eastern Conference	6	2	1	3rd	3	2	1	—	—
1939	1939	Wendell Pickens	—	Orange Empire Conference / Eastern Conference	1	9	0	6th	0	5	0	—	—
1940	1940	Ed Goddard	—	Orange Empire Conference / Eastern Conference	7	2	0	2nd	3	2	0	—	—
1941	1941	Ed Goddard	—	Orange Empire Conference / Eastern Conference	7	2	0	2nd	3	2	0	—	—
1942	1942	Dick Spaulding	—	Orange Empire Conference / Eastern Conference	6	2	0	2nd	3	1	0	—	—
No team in 1943—World War II.
1944	1944	W. W. Bradshaw	—	Independent	3	3	0					—	—
1945	1945	Lloyd Martin	—	Eastern Conference	2	6	1	T–2nd	1	1	0	—	—
1946	1946	Ed Goddard	NJCAA	Eastern Conference	3	4	2	2nd	2	1	2	—	—
1947	1947	Ed Goddard	NJCAA	Eastern Conference	7	3	0	3rd	3	2	0	—	—
1948	1948	Ed Goddard	NJCAA	Eastern Conference	7	2	1	3rd	4	2	0	—	—
1949	1949	Ed Goddard	NJCAA	Eastern Conference	2	7	1	T–5th	1	4	1	—	—
1950	1950	Tex Oliver	NJCAA	Eastern Conference	4	4	2	5th	1	3	2	—	—
1951	1951	Tex Oliver	NJCAA	Eastern Conference	4	5	0	T–4th	2	4	0	—	—
1952	1952	Dick Spaulding	NJCAA	Eastern Conference	8	3	0	T–4th	3	3	0	—	—
1953	1953	Dick Spaulding	NJCAA	Eastern Conference	9	2	0	1st	6	0	0	—	—
1954	1954	Bud Dawson	NJCAA	Eastern Conference	6	5	0	5th	2	4	0	—	—
1955	1955	Bud Dawson	NJCAA	Eastern Conference	9	2	0	1st	6	0	0	—	—
1956	1956	Bud Dawson	NJCAA	Eastern Conference	5	4	0	4th	3	3	0	—	—
1957	1957	Bud Dawson	NJCAA	Eastern Conference	4	4	1	5th	3	4	0	—	—
1958	1958	Oran Breeland	NJCAA	Eastern Conference	2	6	1	6th	2	4	1	—	—
1959	1959	Oran Breeland	NJCAA	Eastern Conference	2	6	1	T–6th	2	5	0	—	—
1960	1960	Oran Breeland	NJCAA	Eastern Conference	2	7	0	6th	2	5	0	—	—
1961	1961	Hal Sherbeck	NJCAA	Eastern Conference	6	4	0	3rd	5	2	0	L Orange Show Bowl	—
1962	1962	Hal Sherbeck	NJCAA	Eastern Conference	6	2	1	3rd	6	2	1	—	24
1963	1963	Hal Sherbeck	NJCAA	Eastern Conference	3	5	1	T–6th	3	5	1	—	—
1964	1964	Hal Sherbeck	NJCAA	Eastern Conference	8	2	0	1st	7	0	0	W Potato Bowl	4
1965	1965	Hal Sherbeck	NJCAA	Eastern Conference	10	0	0	1st	7	0	0	W Junior Rose Bowl	—
1966	1966	Hal Sherbeck	NJCAA	Eastern Conference	9	0	1	1st	7	0	0	W Potato Bowl	3
1967	1967	Hal Sherbeck	NJCAA	Eastern Conference	12	0	0	1st	8	0	0	—	1
1968	1968	Hal Sherbeck	NJCAA	South Coast Conference	8	1	0	2nd	6	1	0	—	9
1969	1969	Hal Sherbeck	NJCAA	South Coast Conference	10	2	0	T–1st	5	1	0	—	6
1970	1970	Hal Sherbeck	NJCAA	South Coast Conference	11	1	0	1st	6	0	0	—	2
1971	1971	Hal Sherbeck	NJCAA	South Coast Conference	5	4	0	3rd	4	2	0	—	—
1972	1972	Hal Sherbeck	NJCAA	South Coast Conference	4	4	1	4th	2	2	1	—	—
1973	1973	Hal Sherbeck	NJCAA	South Coast Conference	10	1	0	1st	5	0	0	—	3
1974	1974	Hal Sherbeck	NJCAA	South Coast Conference	5	3	1	T–1st	4	1	0	—	—
1975	1975	Hal Sherbeck	NJCAA	South Coast Conference	7	2	0	2nd	5	1	0	—	19
1976	1976	Hal Sherbeck	NJCAA	South Coast Conference	9	2	0	1st	5	1	0	W Avocado Bowl	6
1977	1977	Hal Sherbeck	NJCAA	South Coast Conference	10	1	0	1st	6	0	0	L Avocado Bowl	2
1978	1978	Hal Sherbeck	NJCAA	South Coast Conference	6	4	0	T–3rd	3	3	0	—	23
1979	1979	Hal Sherbeck	NJCAA	South Coast Conference	7	3	0	2nd	4	2	0	—	19
1980	1980	Hal Sherbeck	NJCAA	South Coast Conference	7	4	0	T–1st	5	1	0	L Avocado Bowl	—
1981	1981	Hal Sherbeck	NJCAA	South Coast Conference	9	1	0	T–1st	5	1	0	—	5
1982	1982	Hal Sherbeck	NJCAA	South Coast Conference	9	2	0	2nd	5	1	0	W Pony Bowl	9
1983	1983	Hal Sherbeck	NJCAA	South Coast Conference	10	0	1	1st	5	0	1	W Potato Bowl	1
1984	1984	Hal Sherbeck	NJCAA	Pac-9 Conference	10	1	0	T–1st	7	1	0	W Pony Bowl	3
1985	1985	Hal Sherbeck	NJCAA	Pac-9 Conference	8	3	0	1st	7	1	0	L Pony Bowl	27
1986	1986	Hal Sherbeck	NJCAA	South Coast Conference	6	4	0	T–2nd	5	2	0	—	25
1987	1987	Hal Sherbeck	NJCAA	South Coast Conference	5	3	2	2nd	4	1	2	—	—
1988	1988	Hal Sherbeck	NJCAA	Mission Conference	10	1	0	1st (Central)	5	0	0	L Potato Bowl	3
1989	1989	Hal Sherbeck	NJCAA	Mission Conference	6	4	0	3rd (Central)	3	2	0	—	—
1990	1990	Hal Sherbeck	NJCAA	Mission Conference	7	3	0	T–4th (Central)	2	3	0	—	23
1991	1991	Hal Sherbeck	NJCAA	Mission Conference	8	3	0	T–2nd (Central)	3	2	0	W Potato Bowl	—
1992	1992	Marv Sampson & Glenn Thomas	NJCAA	Mission Conference	1	9	0	T–5th (Central)	1	4	0	—	—
1993	1993	Gene Murphy	NJCAA	Mission Conference	3	7	0	6th (Central)	0	5	0	—	—
1994	1994	Gene Murphy	NJCAA	Mission Conference	7	3	1	2nd (Central)	5	1	0	W Western State K-Swiss Bowl	23
1995	1995	Gene Murphy	NJCAA	Mission Conference	4	5	1	T–2nd (Central)	4	2	0	—	—
1996	1996	Gene Murphy	NJCAA	Mission Conference	5	5	0	T–4th (Central)	3	3	0	—	—
1997	1997	Gene Murphy	NJCAA	Mission Conference	5	5	0	T–4th (Central)	3	3	0	—	—
1998	1998	Gene Murphy	NJCAA	Mission Conference	3	7	0	T–3rd (Central)	2	3	0	—	—
1999	1999	Gene Murphy	NJCAA	Mission Conference	3	7	0	T–3rd (Central)	2	3	0	—	—
2000	2000	Gene Murphy	NJCAA	Mission Conference	4	6	0	2nd (Central)	3	2	0	—	—
2001	2001	Gene Murphy	NJCAA	Mission Conference	6	5	0	3rd (Central)	3	2	0	L US Bank Beach Bowl	—
2002	2002	Gene Murphy	NJCAA	Mission Conference	3	7	0	5th (Central)	1	4	0	—	—
2003	2003	Gene Murphy	NJCAA	Mission Conference	10	3	0	1st (National)	5	0	0	W US Bank Beach Bowl, L CCCAA National Championship	—
2004	2004	Gene Murphy	NJCAA	Mission Conference	7	4	0	T–3rd (National)	2	3	0	L Golden Empire Bowl (SCFA Semifinal)	—
2005	2005	Gene Murphy	NJCAA	Mission Conference	8	3	0	3rd (American)	3	2	0	W Golden Empire Bowl	—
2006	2006	Gene Murphy	NJCAA	Mission Conference	5	5	0	3rd (American)	3	2	0	—	—
2007	2007	Gene Murphy	NJCAA	Mission Conference	7	3	0	4th (American)	2	2	0	W Orange County Bowl	—
2008	2008	Tim Byrnes	NJCAA	National Southern Conference / League	10	2	0	1st	6	0	0	W National Bowl	8
2009	2009	Tim Byrnes	NJCAA	National Southern Conference / League	10	2	0	1st	6	0	0	W American Bowl	5
2010	2010	Tim Byrnes	NJCAA	National Southern Conference / League	7	4	0	3rd	3	2	0	W Golden Empire Bowl	6
2011	2011	Tim Byrnes	NJCAA	National Southern Conference / League	5	5	0	6th	0	5	0	—	—
2012	2012	Tim Byrnes	NJCAA	National Southern Conference / League	7	4	0	1st	5	1	0	W Western State Bowl	—
2013	2013	Tim Byrnes	NJCAA	National Southern Conference / League	12	1	0	1st	6	0	0	W National Bowl	2
2014	2014	Tim Byrnes	NJCAA	National Southern Conference / League	8	3	0	1st	6	0	0	L Southern California Bowl	3 (SCFA)
2015	2015	Tim Byrnes	NJCAA	National Southern Conference / League	6	5	0	4th	3	3	0	L Western State Bowl	9 (SCFA)
2016	2016	Tim Byrnes	NJCAA	National Southern Conference / League	12	1	0	1st	4	1	0	W National Bowl	2
2017	2017	Tim Byrnes	NJCAA	National Southern Conference / League	3	0	7	1st	2	3	0	V CCCAA National Championship	1
2018	2018	Tim Byrnes	NJCAA	National Central League	2	8	0	1st	2	3	0	—	—
2019	2019	Garrett Campbell	NJCAA	National Central League	5	5	0	3rd	3	2	0	—	—
No team in 2020—COVID-19.
2021	2021	Garrett Campbell	NJCAA	National Southern League	6	5	0	3rd	3	2	0	L Patriotic Bowl	—
2022	2022	Garrett Campbell	NJCAA	National Southern League	10	2	0	1st	5	0	0	L SCFA Regional	3
2023	2023	Garrett Campbell	NJCAA	National Southern League	10	1	0	1st	7	0	0	L SCFA Semifinal	5
2024	2024	Phil Austin & Brian Crooks	NJCAA	National Southern League	3	3	0		1	2	0	—	—
