= Southern California Football Association =

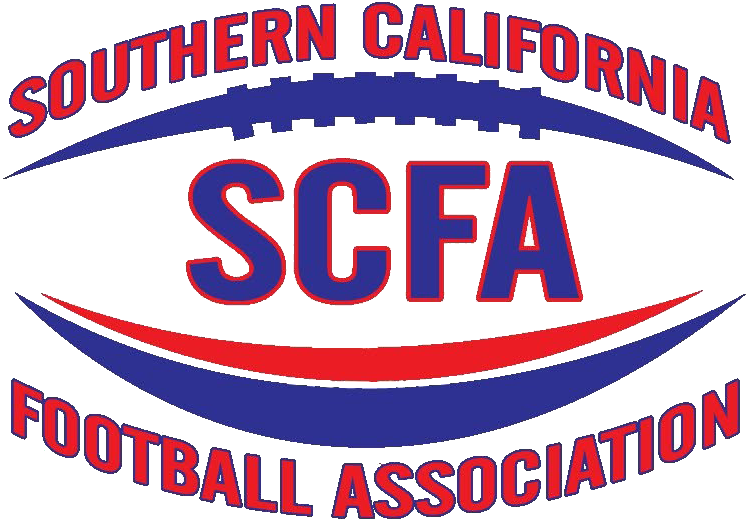
- Association: 3C2A
- Founded: 2008; 18 years ago
- Commissioner: Jim Sartoris
- Sports fielded: 1 (football only)
- No. of teams: 36
- Region: California
- Website: scfafootball.com

Locations
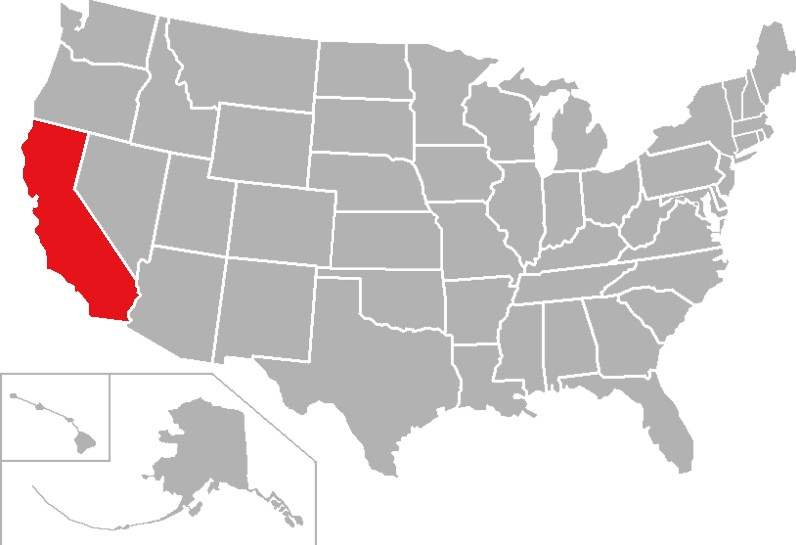

The Southern California Football Association (SCFA) is a college athletic conference affiliated with the California Community College Athletic Association (3C2A). Member institutions are located in California. The SCFA was organized in 2008. The SCFA is divided into the National League and the American League and further divided into the National Northern League, National Central League, National Southern League, American Metro League, and American Pacific League.

The SCFA works in conjunction with the Northern California Football Conference (NCFC) as the two bodies that compose the 3C2A's football season.

== History ==
=== Chronological timeline ===
- 2008 – The Southern California Football Association (SCFA) was founded. Charter members of the SCFA's National Conference included the College of the Canyons, Allan Hancock College, Pasadena City College, Bakersfield College, Ventura College, Moorpark College, and Glendale Community College representing the National Northern Conference, Mt. San Antonio College, El Camino College, Cerritos College, the College of the Desert, Chaffey College, Riverside City College, and Citrus College representing the National Central Conference, and Fullerton College, Saddleback College, Palomar College, Santa Ana College, Grossmont College, Long Beach City College, and Orange Coast College representing the National Southern Conference. Charter members of the SCFA's American Conference included Southwestern College, San Diego Mesa College, Golden West College, Victor Valley College, Compton College, Los Angeles Harbor College, Mt. San Jacinto College, and San Bernardino Valley College representing the American Mountain Conference and Antelope Valley College, Santa Barbara City College, Los Angeles Valley College, West Los Angeles College, Santa Monica College, Los Angeles Pierce College, Los Angeles Southwest College, and East Los Angeles College representing the American Pacific League.
- 2010 – The SCFA was broken into three conferences: National Conference, Central Conference, and American Conference.
- 2010 – The National Conference was broken into the National Northern Conference and the National Southern Conference.
- 2010 – El Camino and Cerritos moved to the National Northern Conference.
- 2010 – Pasadena City and Mt. San Antonio moved to the National Southern Conference.
- 2010 – The Central Conference was broken into the Central West Conference, which included Moorpark, Chaffey, Citrus, Long Beach City, Los Angeles Harbor, and Antelope Valley, and the Central East Conference, which included Desert, Riverside City, Santa Ana, Orange Coast, Southwestern (CA), and Golden West.
- 2010 – The American Conference was broken into the American Mountain Conference and the American Pacific Conference.
- 2010 – East Los Angeles moved to the American Mountain Conference.
- 2010 – Glendale (CA) moved to the American Pacific Conference.
- 2012 – The Central Conference was dissolved, leaving the National Conference and the American Conference.
- 2012 – Pasadena City and El Camino moved to the National Northern Conference.
- 2012 – The National Central Conference was formed. The members were Mt. San Antonio, El Camino, Desert, Riverside City, Citrus, Long Beach, and Los Angeles Harbor.
- 2012 – Santa Ana moved to the National Southern Conference.
- 2012 – Chaffey and Southwestern (CA) moved to the American Mountain Conference.
- 2012 – Antelope Valley moved to the American Pacific Conference.
- 2014 – The National Conference and American Conference were renamed to the National League and American League. Each subdivision also changed from conference to league.
- 2014 – Chaffey moved to the National Central League.
- 2014 – Desert moved to the American Mountain League.
- 2016 – The American Metro League was formed. The members were Pasadena City, Glendale (CA), Santa Ana, Compton, West Los Angeles, Los Angeles Southwest, and East Los Angeles.
- 2016 – Santa Monica moved to the National Northern League.
- 2016 – Allan Hancock and Citrus moved to the American Pacific League.
- 2018 – Long Beach City and East Los Angeles moved to the National Northern League.
- 2018 – Fullerton, Palomar, and San Diego Mesa moved to the National Central League.
- 2018 – Riverside City and Southwestern (CA) moved to the National Southern League.
- 2018 – Chaffey and Los Angeles Valley moved to the American Metro League.
- 2018 – Citrus and Antelope Valley moved to the American Mountain League.
- 2018 – Los Angeles Harbor moved to the American Pacific League.
- 2020 – The 3C2A cancelled the 2020 fall season due to the COVID-19 pandemic. Only Antelope Valley played regulation games.
- 2021 – 36 of the 37 schools returned for the 2021 season: Los Angeles Southwest did not host a varsity season.
- 2021 – Allan Hancock moved to the National Northern League.
- 2021 – Chaffey and Riverside City moved to the National Central League.
- 2021 – Fullerton, San Diego Mesa, and San Bernardino Valley moved to the National Southern League.
- 2021 – Citrus, Orange Coast, and Los Angeles Harbor moved to the American Metro League.
- 2021 – Pasadena City, Grossmont, and Compton moved to the American Mountain League.
- 2021 – Moorpark and Antelope Valley moved to the American Pacific League.
- 2022 – Los Angeles Southwest returned and Los Angeles Harbor discontinued its football program.
- 2023 – The American Mountain League dissolved.
- 2023 – Moorpark, El Camino, Antelope Valley, and Santa Barbara moved to the National Northern League.
- 2023 – Citrus, Long Beach City, Orange Coast, Golden West, and San Bernardino Valley moved to the National Central League.
- 2023 – Riverside City, Palomar, and Mt. San Jacinto moved to the National Southern League.
- 2023 – Chaffey, Victor Valley, and Compton moved to the American Metro League.
- 2023 – Pasadena City, Glendale (CA), and Los Angeles Southwest moved to the American Pacific League.

== Member schools ==
=== Current members ===
The SCFA currently has 36 member schools, all of them are community colleges.

Institution	Location	Founded	Enrollment	Nickname	Joined	Conference	Primary conference
National League
Allan Hancock College	Santa Maria, California	1920	13,741	Bulldogs	2008	NNL	Western State (WSC)
Antelope Valley College	Lancaster, California	1929	14,024	Marauders	2008	NNL	Western State (WSC)
Bakersfield College	Bakersfield, California	1913	27,800	Renegades	2008	NNL	Western State (WSC)
Cerritos College	Norwalk, California	1955	956	Falcons	2008	NCL	South Coast (SCC)
Citrus College	Glendora, California	1915	19,626	Owls	2008	NCL	Western State (WSC)
College of the Canyons	Santa Clarita, California	1969	33,481	Cougars	2008	NNL	Western State (WSC)
East Los Angeles College	Monterey Park, California	1945	35,403	Huskies	2008	NCL	South Coast (SCC)
El Camino College	Alondra Park, California	1947	22,654	Warriors	2008	NNL	South Coast (SCC)
Fullerton College	Fullerton, California	1913	21,017	Hornets	2008	NSL	Orange Empire (OEC)
Golden West College	Huntington Beach, California	1965	12,796	Rustlers	2008	NCL	Orange Empire (OEC)
Grossmont College	El Cajon, California	1961	18,095	Griffins	2008	NSL	Pacific Coast (PCAC)
Long Beach City College	Long Beach, California	1927	23,866	Vikings	2008	NCL	South Coast (SCC)
Moorpark College	Moorpark, California	1967	13,756	Raiders	2008	NNL	Western State (WSC)
Mt. San Antonio College	Walnut, California	1945	61,000	Mounties	2008	NCL	South Coast (SCC)
Mt. San Jacinto College	Riverside County, California	1962	25,400	Eagles	2008	NSL	Inland Empire (IEC)
Orange Coast College	Costa Mesa, California	1947	25,000	Pirates	2008	NCL	Orange Empire (OEC)
Palomar College	San Diego County, California	1946	?	Comets	2008	NSL	Pacific Coast (PCAC)
Riverside City College	Riverside, California	1916	20,604	Tigers	2008	NSL	Orange Empire (OEC)
Saddleback College	Mission Viejo, California	1968	25,879	Bobcats	2008	NSL	Orange Empire (OEC)
San Bernardino Valley College	San Bernardino, California	1926	17,044	Wolverines	2008	NCL	Pacific Coast (PCAC)
San Diego Mesa College	Clairemont, California	1964	29,045	Olympians	2008	NSL	Pacific Coast (PCAC)
Santa Barbara City College	Santa Barbara, California	1909	18,848	Vaqueros	2008	NNL	Western State (WSC)
Southwestern College	Chula Vista, California	1961	27,000	Jaguars	2008	NSL	Pacific Coast (PCAC)
Ventura College	Ventura, California	1925	13,737	Pirates	2008	NNL	Western State (WSC)
American League
Chaffey College	Rancho Cucamonga, California	1883	28,000	Panthers	2008	AML	Inland Empire (IEC)
College of the Desert	Palm Desert, California	1958	12,453	Roadrunners	2008	AML	Inland Empire (IEC)
Compton College	Compton, California	1927	6,780	Tartars	2008	AML	South Coast (SCC)
Glendale Community College	Glendale, California	1927	19,207	Vaqueros	2008	APL	Western State (WSC)
Los Angeles Pierce College	Woodland Hills, California	1947	23,000	Brahmas	2008	APL	Western State (WSC)
Los Angeles Southwest College	West Athens, California	1967	8,200	Cougars	2008	APL	South Coast (SCC)
Los Angeles Valley College	Los Angeles, California	1949	18,308	Monarchs	2008	APL	Western State (WSC)
Pasadena City College	Pasadena, California	1924	25,319	Lancers	2008	APL	South Coast (SCC)
Santa Ana College	Santa Ana, California	1915	37,916	Dons	2008	AML	Orange Empire (OEC)
Santa Monica College	Santa Monica, California	1929	29,615	Corsairs	2008	APL	Western State (WSC)
Victor Valley College	Victorville, California	1961	11,504	Rams	2008	AML	Western State (WSC)
West Los Angeles College	Culver City, California	1969	9,859	Wildcats	2008	AML	Western State (WSC)

=== Former members ===
Institution	Location	Founded	Enrollment	Nickname	Joined	Left	Primary conference
Los Angeles Harbor College	Wilmington, California	1949	10,083	Seahawks	2008	2022	South Coast (SCC)
