= South Coast Conference (California) =

The South Coast Conference (SCC) is a college athletic conference that is affiliated with the California Community College Athletic Association (CCCAA). Its members are located in the Greater Los Angeles region. The SSC was formed in 1968 as a football-only conference with eight members: Fullerton College, Golden West College, Mt. San Antonio College, Orange Coast College, Rio Hondo College, San Diego City College, San Diego Mesa College, and Santa Ana College.

== Members ==
The league has 12 full members:

Institution	Location	Founded	Enrollment
Cerritos College	Norwalk, California	1955	24,000
Chaffey College	Rancho Cucamonga, California	1883	18,192
East Los Angeles College	Monterey Park, California	1945	34,700
El Camino College	Torrance, California	1947	22,650
El Camino College Compton Center (formerly Compton College)	Compton, California	1927	6,800
Long Beach City College	Long Beach, California	1927	24,650
Los Angeles Harbor College	Wilmington, California	1949	10,000
Los Angeles Southwest College	Los Angeles, California	1967	8,200
Los Angeles Trade–Technical College	Los Angeles, California	1925	
Mt. San Antonio College	Walnut, California	1946	33,300
Pasadena City College	Pasadena, California	1924	26,800
Rio Hondo College	Whittier, California	1963	

== Former member ==
Institution	Location	Founded	Enrollment
Los Angeles City College in 2009 the school cut all sports programs except women's volleyball due to budget	Los Angeles, California	1929	20,600

== Football standings ==
1968 South Coast Conference (California) football standings
	Conf.					Overall
Team	W		L		T	W		L		T
San Diego City $^	7	–	0	–	0	9	–	1	–	0
Fullerton	6	–	1	–	0	8	–	1	–	0
Santa Ana	5	–	2	–	0	7	–	2	–	0
Golden West	4	–	3	–	0	5	–	4	–	0
Orange Coast	3	–	4	–	0	5	–	4	–	0
San Diego Mesa	2	–	5	–	0	4	–	5	–	0
Mt. San Antonio	0	–	6	–	1	1	–	6	–	2
Rio Hondo	0	–	6	–	1	0	–	8	–	1
$ – Conference champion; ^ – California state junior college large division playoff participant

1969 South Coast Conference (California) football standings
	Conf.					Overall
Team	W		L		T	W		L		T
Fullerton +^	5	–	1	–	0	10	–	2	–	0
San Diego Mesa +	5	–	1	–	0	7	–	2	–	0
Cerritos	4	–	2	–	0	7	–	2	–	0
Orange Coast	3	–	2	–	1	6	–	2	–	1
San Diego City	1	–	4	–	1	1	–	7	–	1
Mt. San Antonio	1	–	5	–	0	1	–	8	–	0
Santa Ana	1	–	5	–	0	1	–	8	–	0
+ – Conference co-champions; ^ – California state junior college large division playoff participant

1970 South Coast Conference (California) football standings
	Conf.					Overall
Team	W		L		T	W		L		T
Fullerton $^	6	–	0	–	0	11	–	1	–	0
Orange Coast	5	–	1	–	0	6	–	3	–	0
San Diego Mesa	3	–	3	–	0	6	–	3	–	0
Santa Ana	3	–	3	–	0	4	–	5	–	0
Cerritos	2	–	4	–	0	4	–	5	–	0
Mt. San Antonio	2	–	4	–	0	4	–	5	–	0
San Diego City	0	–	6	–	0	0	–	7	–	0
$ – Conference champion; ^ – California state junior college large division playoff participant

1971 South Coast Conference (California) football standings
	Conf.					Overall
Team	W		L		T	W		L		T
Orange Coast +^	5	–	1	–	0	7	–	2	–	1
Santa Ana +	5	–	1	–	0	6	–	3	–	0
Fullerton	4	–	2	–	0	5	–	4	–	0
Cerritos	3	–	3	–	0	4	–	5	–	0
San Diego Mesa	2	–	4	–	0	6	–	4	–	0
Mt. San Antonio	2	–	4	–	0	2	–	8	–	0
San Diego City	0	–	6	–	0	0	–	10	–	0
+ – Conference co-champions; ^ – California state junior college large division playoff participant

1972 South Coast Conference (California) football standings
	Conf.					Overall
Team	W		L		T	W		L		T
Cerritos $^	3	–	1	–	1	4	–	3	–	3
Santa Ana	3	–	2	–	0	7	–	3	–	0
Orange Coast	3	–	2	–	0	6	–	3	–	0
Fullerton	2	–	2	–	1	4	–	4	–	1
San Diego Mesa	2	–	3	–	0	4	–	5	–	0
Mt. San Antonio	1	–	4	–	0	5	–	5	–	0
$ – Conference champion; ^ – California state junior college large division playoff participant

1973 South Coast Conference (California) football standings
	Conf.					Overall
Team	W		L		T	W		L		T
Fullerton $^	5	–	0	–	0	10	–	1	–	0
Cerritos	3	–	2	–	0	5	–	5	–	0
Orange Coast	2	–	2	–	1	6	–	3	–	1
Santa Ana	2	–	2	–	1	2	–	6	–	1
Mt. San Antonio	1	–	4	–	0	5	–	4	–	0
San Diego Mesa	1	–	4	–	0	4	–	5	–	0
$ – Conference champion; ^ – California state junior college large division playoff participant

1974 South Coast Conference (California) football standings
	Conf.					Overall
Team	W		L		T	W		L		T
Orange Coast +^	4	–	1	–	0	7	–	5	–	0
Fullerton +	4	–	1	–	0	5	–	3	–	1
San Diego Mesa	3	–	2	–	0	6	–	4	–	0
Cerritos	2	–	3	–	0	4	–	5	–	0
Mt. San Antonio	2	–	3	–	0	2	–	6	–	2
Santa Ana	0	–	5	–	0	1	–	8	–	0
+ – Conference co-champions; ^ – California state junior college Division II playoff participant

1975 South Coast Conference (California) football standings
	Conf.					Overall
Team	W		L		T	W		L		T
Orange Coast $	6	–	0	–	0	11	–	0	–	0
Fullerton	5	–	1	–	0	8	–	2	–	0
Santa Ana	3	–	3	–	0	5	–	5	–	0
Cerritos	2	–	4	–	0	4	–	6	–	0
San Diego Mesa	2	–	4	–	0	3	–	7	–	0
Grossmont	2	–	4	–	0	2	–	8	–	0
Mt. San Antonio	1	–	5	–	0	1	–	8	–	0
$ – Conference champion

1976 South Coast Conference (California) football standings
	Conf.					Overall
Team	W		L		T	W		L		T
Fullerton $	5	–	1	–	0	9	–	2	–	0
Orange Coast	4	–	2	–	0	6	–	4	–	0
San Diego Mesa	3	–	3	–	0	6	–	4	–	0
Mt. San Antonio	2	–	3	–	1	5	–	3	–	2
Cerritos	2	–	3	–	1	4	–	4	–	1
Grossmont	2	–	4	–	0	5	–	5	–	0
Santa Ana	2	–	4	–	0	3	–	6	–	0
$ – Conference champion

1977 South Coast Conference (California) football standings
	Conf.					Overall
Team	W		L		T	W		L		T
Fullerton $	6	–	0	–	0	10	–	1	–	0
San Diego Mesa	5	–	1	–	0	9	–	1	–	0
Orange Coast	3	–	2	–	1	5	–	4	–	1
Mt. San Antonio	3	–	3	–	0	5	–	5	–	0
Grossmont	1	–	4	–	1	3	–	6	–	1
Cerritos	1	–	5	–	0	2	–	8	–	0
Santa Ana	1	–	5	–	0	1	–	7	–	1
$ – Conference champion

1978 South Coast Conference (California) football standings
	Conf.					Overall
Team	W		L		T	W		L		T
San Diego Mesa +	4	–	2	–	0	7	–	3	–	0
Cerritos +	4	–	2	–	0	6	–	5	–	0
Orange Coast	3	–	3	–	0	7	–	3	–	0
Santa Ana	3	–	3	–	0	7	–	3	–	0
Fullerton	3	–	3	–	0	6	–	4	–	0
Grossmont	2	–	4	–	0	4	–	6	–	0
Mt. San Antonio	2	–	4	–	0	3	–	7	–	0
+ – Conference co-champions

1979 South Coast Conference (California) football standings
	Conf.					Overall
Team	W		L		T	W		L		T
San Diego Mesa $	5	–	1	–	0	9	–	2	–	0
Fullerton	4	–	2	–	0	7	–	3	–	0
Cerritos	3	–	3	–	0	?	–	?	–	0
Mt. San Antonio	3	–	3	–	0	7	–	3	–	0
Santa Ana	3	–	3	–	0	7	–	3	–	0
Grossmont	2	–	4	–	0	?	–	?	–	0
Orange Coast	1	–	5	–	0	2	–	8	–	0
$ – Conference champion

1983 South Coast Conference (California) football standings
	Conf.					Overall
Team	W		L		T	W		L		T
Fullerton $	5	–	0	–	1	10	–	0	–	1
Cerritos	5	–	1	–	0	8	–	2	–	0
Orange Coast	3	–	2	–	1	4	–	5	–	1
Mt. San Antonio	3	–	3	–	0	5	–	5	–	0
San Diego Mesa	2	–	4	–	0	5	–	5	–	0
Golden West	2	–	4	–	0	4	–	6	–	0
Grossmont	0	–	6	–	0	0	–	10	–	0
$ – Conference champion

1986 South Coast Conference (California) football standings
	Conf.					Overall
Team	W		L		T	W		L		T
Cerritos $	6	–	1	–	0	7	–	3	–	1
Golden West	5	–	2	–	0	8	–	3	–	0
Fullerton	5	–	2	–	0	6	–	4	–	0
Pasadena	4	–	3	–	0	5	–	5	–	0
Long Beach	3	–	4	–	0	6	–	4	–	0
El Camino	3	–	4	–	0	4	–	6	–	0
Mt. San Antonio	1	–	6	–	0	3	–	6	–	1
Compton	1	–	6	–	0	1	–	9	–	0
$ – Conference champion

1987 South Coast Conference (California) football standings
	Conf.					Overall
Team	W		L		T	W		L		T
El Camino $	7	–	0	–	0	11	–	0	–	0
Fullerton	4	–	1	–	2	5	–	3	–	2
Cerritos	4	–	2	–	1	5	–	4	–	1
Golden West	4	–	2	–	1	5	–	4	–	1
Pasadena	3	–	4	–	0	6	–	4	–	0
Mt. San Antonio	2	–	4	–	1	4	–	5	–	1
Long Beach	1	–	6	–	0	3	–	7	–	0
Compton	0	–	6	–	1	2	–	7	–	1
$ – Conference champion
