= Cerritos College =

Community college in Norwalk, California, US

- Type: Public community college
- Established: 1955 (71 years ago)
- Accreditation: Accrediting Commission for Community and Junior Colleges
- Budget: $102 million
- President: Jose Fierro
- Academic staff: 292 (full-time); 847 (part-time)
- Administrative staff: 956
- Students: 22,731 (2016–17)
- Location: Norwalk, California, U.S. 33°53′09″N 118°05′41″W
- Campus: Metropolitan, 135 acres (54.6 ha)
- Colors: Blue & white
- Nickname: Falcons
- Sporting affiliations: California Community College Athletic Association; South Coast Conference; Southern California Football Association
- Mascot: Franco the Falcon
- Website: www.cerritos.edu

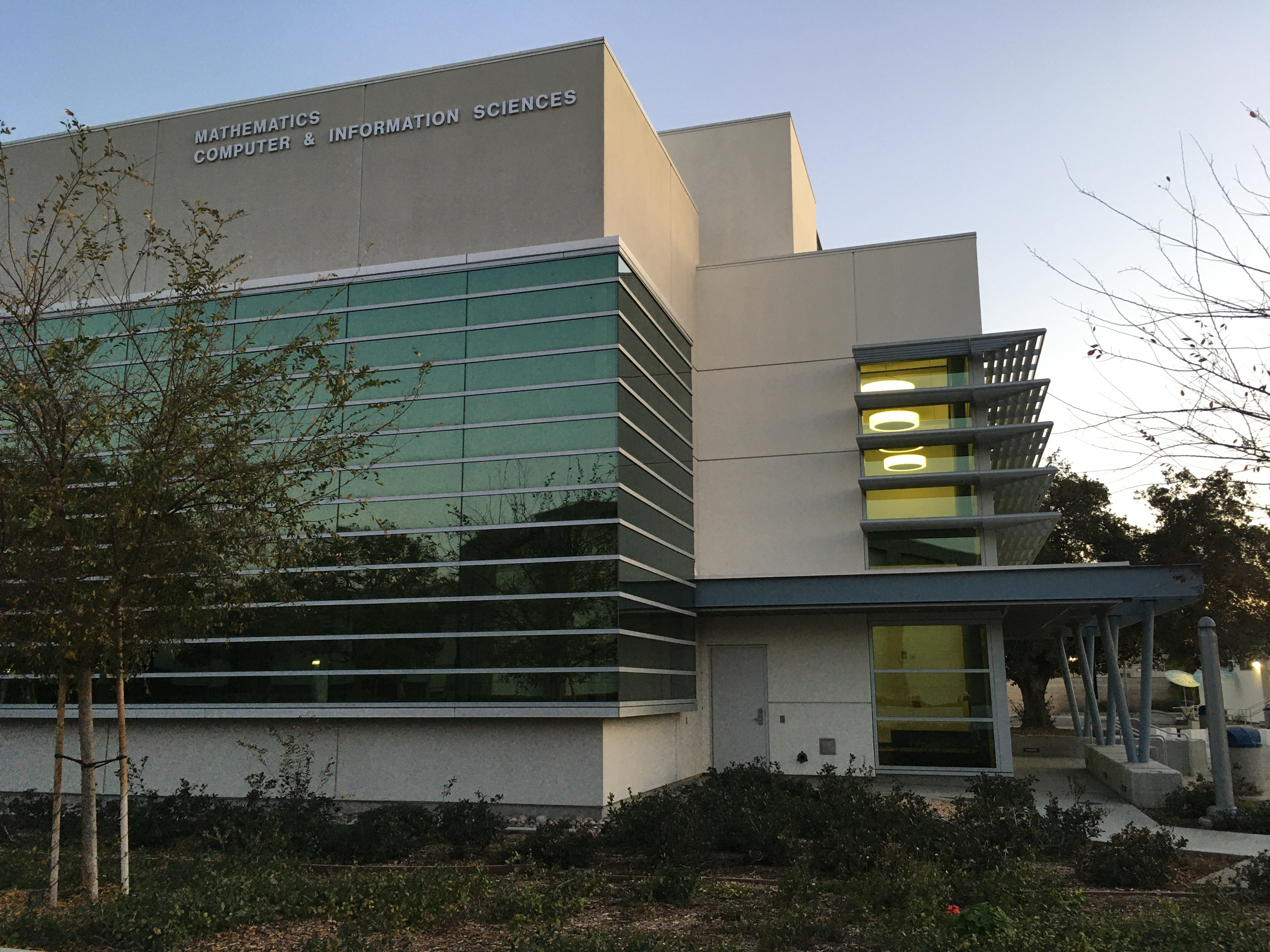
Cerritos College MCIS building

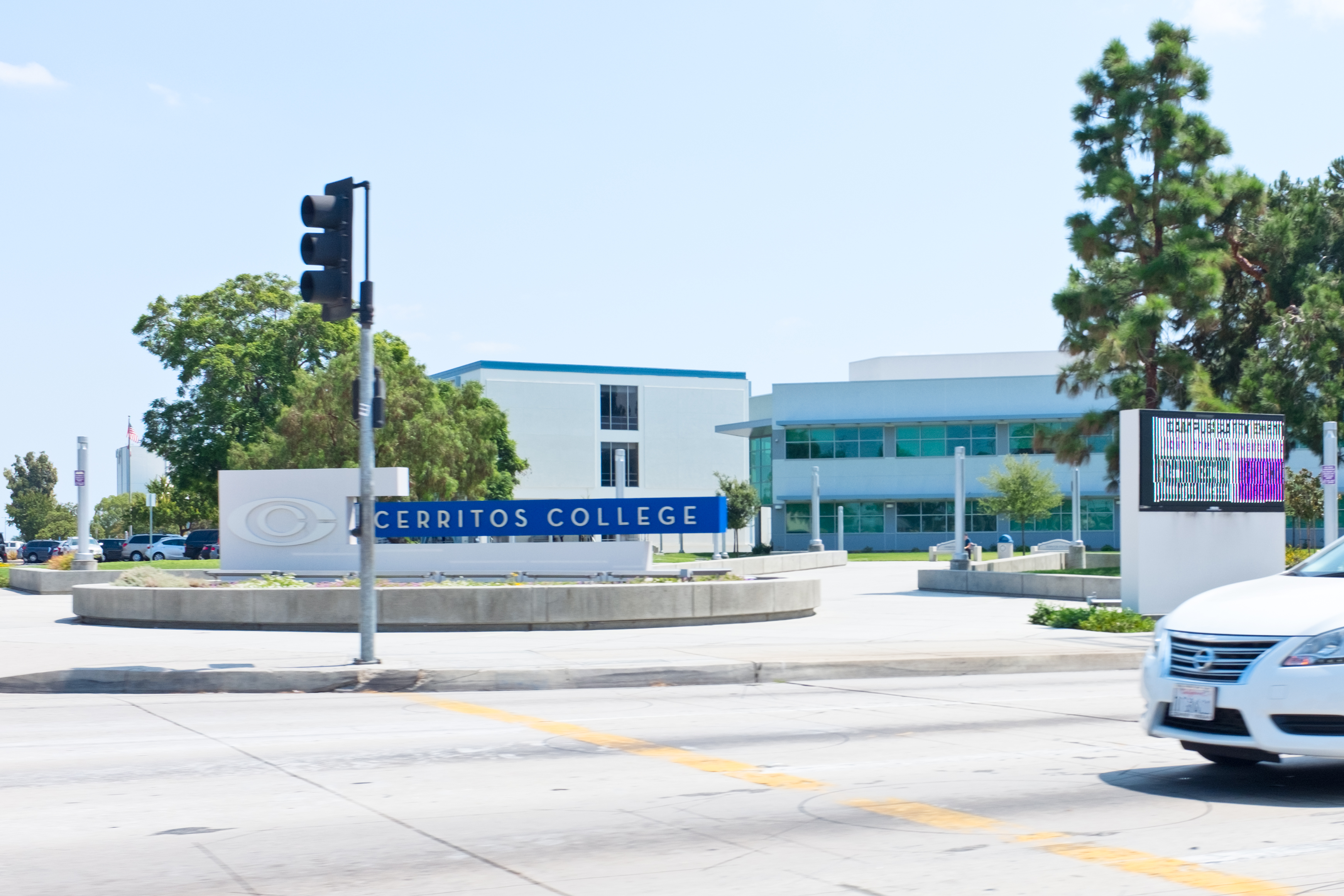
Entrance to Cerritos College

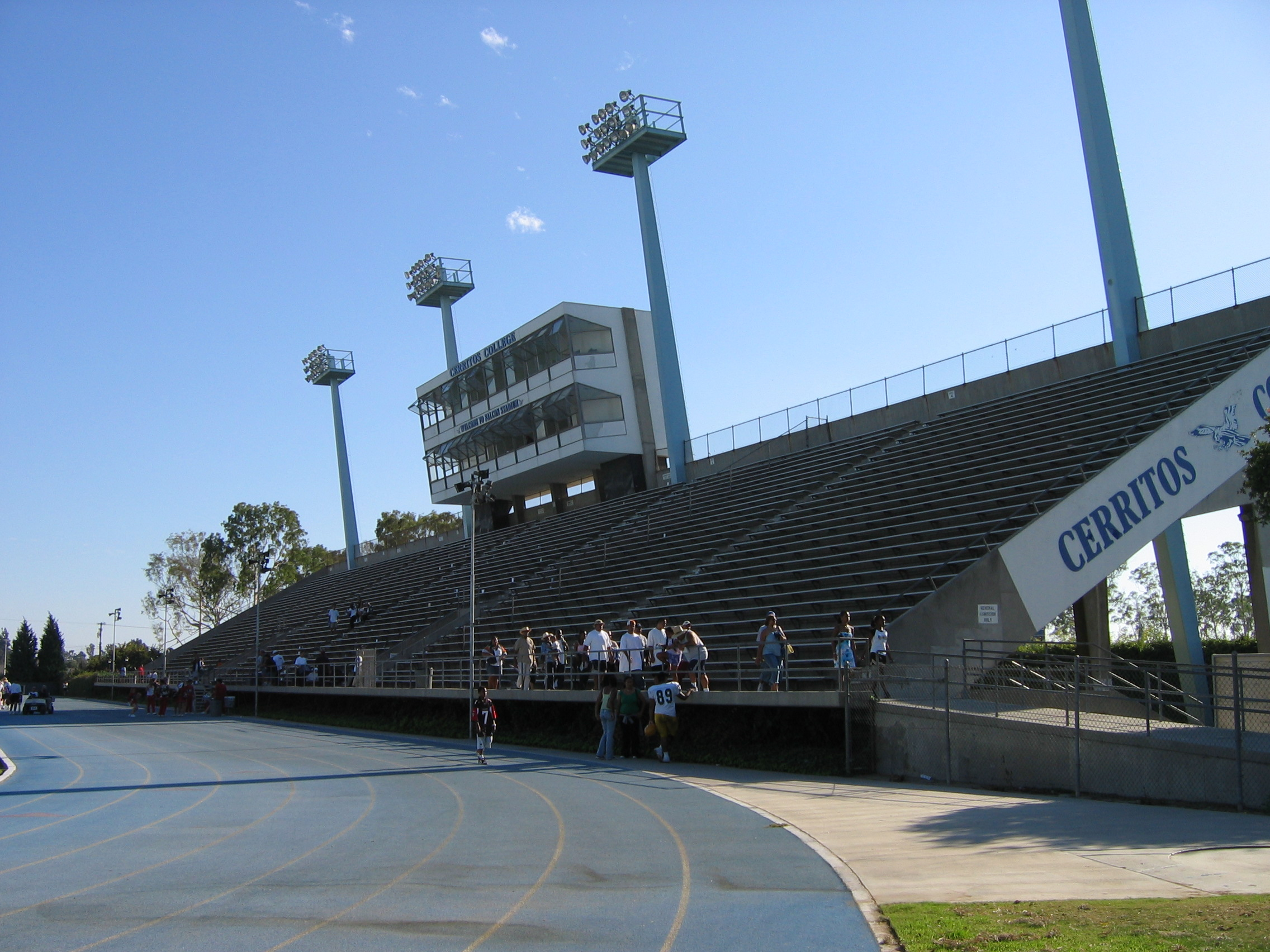
Falcon Stadium in 2008

Cerritos College is a public community college in Norwalk, California, United States. It was established in 1955 after a collective regional effort through a landmark vote by residents across seven distinct school districts in the Gateway Cities of Southeast Los Angeles.

Cerritos is a two-year undergraduate institution that enrolled approximately 35,000 students in the 2024–2025 academic year. It houses 284 majors across 97 departments and 11 academic divisions. Its 135-acre (55 ha) campus is located in a suburban neighborhood 15 miles from the Puente Hills and 20 miles from Downtown Los Angeles.

Cerritos has one of the highest return on investment figures in the state of California, and the highest in the greater Los Angeles region. The student body at Cerritos is noted to be high in socioeconomic diversity and is designated as a Hispanic-Serving Institution, with around 70% of the student body identifying as Hispanic in the 2024–2025 academic year. The college athletics teams, known as the Falcons, compete in the South Coast Conference.

Cerritos alumni include 54 National Football League (NFL) and 32 Major League Baseball (MLB) players and staff. Cerritos alumni have an economic impact of $537.4 million in the greater Los Angeles region.

== History ==
The college was founded in 1955. It was named after Rancho Los Cerritos, a local ranch in the 19th century. In turn the college was part of the inspiration for the renaming of the neighboring city of Dairy Valley to Cerritos. The district covers Artesia, Bellflower, Cerritos, Downey, Norwalk, La Mirada, and Hawaiian Gardens.

Originally, classrooms were rented in the now defunct Excelsior High School in September 1956. On July 24, 1957, the Cerritos Junior College District won the case against Dairy Valley (now Cerritos) to use the undeveloped land as an educational site. In September 1959, the college moved from Excelsior High School to the current site.

== Organization and administration ==
The founder was Ralph Burnight of Redlands, a resident of Bellflower and superintendent of the Excelsior School District. The current college president is Jose Fierro.

== Campus modernization ==
On February 15, 2017, the school opened two new buildings: a new Math and Computer Information Sciences building, and a Fine Arts complex. Together, the new facilities cost over $55 million and were funded by Measure G bond dollars.

== Housing ==
On June 11, 2020, Cerritos became the first California community college to have housing for students without a place to live or with uncertain housing.

== Athletics ==
Men's sports	Women's sports
Baseball	Basketball
Basketball	Cross Country
Cross Country	Soccer
Football	Softball
Soccer	Swimming & Diving
Swimming & Diving	Track & Field
Track & Field	Volleyball
Water Polo	Water Polo
Wrestling	Wrestling

Student demographics as of Fall 2023
Race and ethnicity	Total
Hispanic	69.2%
White	9.7%
African American	6.5%
Asian	5.7%
Unknown	3.5%
Filipino	2.9%
Multiracial	2.2%
Pacific Islander	0.3%
American Indian/Alaska Native	0.2%
