= Drew Westling =

American football coach and former player (born 1987)

Current position
- Title: Head coach
- Team: Mt. Carmel High School
- Conference: Palomar League
- Record: 25–19

Biographical details
- Born: July 2, 1987 (age 39); Newport Beach, California, U.S.

Playing career
- 2005–2006: Tulsa
- 2007: Southwestern (CA)
- 2008–2009: San Diego State
- Position: Quarterback

Coaching career (HC unless noted)
- 2010–2012: Aliso Niguel HS (CA) (OC)
- 2013: Southwestern (CA) (QB)
- 2014: Chula Vista HS (CA)
- 2015: Aliso Niguel HS (CA) (assistant)
- 2016–2019: Hilltop HS (CA)
- 2020 (spring): Eastlake HS (CA)
- 2021–present: Mt. Carmel HS (CA)

Accomplishments and honors

Awards
- Second-team all-Foothill Conference (2007)

Drew Westling (born July 2, 1987) is an American football coach and former player. He is the head football coach for Mt. Carmel High School, a position he has held since 2021. Westling was the head football coach for Chula Vista High School in 2014 and Hilltop High School from 2016 to 2019. He also coached for Aliso Niguel High School and Southwestern College in Chula Vista, California. Westling played college football for Tulsa, Southwestern College, and San Diego State as a quarterback.

== Early life ==
Westling was born on July 2, 1987, in Newport Beach, California. The son of a football coach, he played as a lineman for much of his youth due to his size, switching to the quarterback position as a high school freshman. Westling attended Aliso Niguel High School in Aliso Viejo, California, where he was a three-year letterwinner in football under his father, who was offensive coordinator at the time. He suffered a broken leg ahead of his junior season and returned in time for the playoffs, albeit with diminished mobility. In the first game of his senior year, Westling passed for a school-record 482 yards and five touchdowns against El Toro High School. As a senior, he completed 216-of-350 passes for 2,988 yards and 28 touchdowns with nine interceptions, and rushed for 124 yards and seven touchdowns, to lead the county in passing (over Mark Sanchez) and win Sea View League MVP honors. Westling guided the Wolverines to a 10–2 record and an appearance in the CIF quarterfinals. However, he was under-recruited after missing his junior season due to injury. On February 15, 2005, Westling signed a National Letter of Intent to play college football at Tulsa, which he chose over Idaho.

== College career ==
As a freshman at Tulsa in 2005, Westling took a redshirt season. He appeared in three games in 2006 and completed his only pass attempt for 37 yards, a screen pass to Dexter Taylor in a win over Stephen F. Austin. After seeing limited playing time with the Golden Hurricane, Westling transferred to Southwestern College in Chula Vista, California. In his lone season with the Jaguars in 2007, he completed 173-of-325 passes for 2,087 yards and 14 touchdowns with 12 interceptions, earning second-team all-Foothill Conference honors. Westling played under the guidance of head coach Ed Carberry, who was both a high school teammate and a coaching rival of his father's.

In November 2007, Westling committed to San Diego State. Ahead of the 2008 season, he completed 14-of-26 passing attempts for 260 yards and two touchdowns with two interceptions in the Red & Black spring game. However, Westling was beaten out by redshirt freshman Ryan Lindley for the starting job. He replaced an injured Lindley in a road defeat at TCU in early October, completing six-of-17 attempts for 61 yards. With Lindley sidelined, Westling earned the start the following week and completed 18-of-35 passes for 128 yards with two interceptions in a 35–10 loss to Air Force. He also scored a one-yard rushing touchdown, becoming the first Aztec quarterback since 1997 to rush for a touchdown in his first career start. As a senior in 2009, Westling again substituted an injured Lindley and threw his first passing touchdown, an eight-yard toss to Roberto Wallace, in a 34–20 loss at Idaho. In two seasons with the Aztecs, he played in seven games and made one start, completing 32-of-65 passing attempts for 270 yards and one touchdown.

== Coaching career ==
After college, Westling returned to his alma mater, Aliso Niguel High School, and served as offensive coordinator from 2010 to 2012 under his father, head coach Kurt Westling. In 2013, he served as quarterbacks coach at Southwestern College in Chula Vista, California, while doing his student teaching at a nearby high school. In March 2014, Westling was hired as head football coach at Chula Vista High School. He secured his first-ever win as a head coach in a 36–27 victory against rivals Hilltop High School, claiming the Kiwanis Trophy. However, Westling resigned from the position after finishing the season with a 2–8 record, citing "philosophical differences" with the school's administration. "They have great kids and great people at Chula Vista, and I was fortunate to get that job," he later said. "But it just wasn’t the right fit." Westling spent the 2015 season at Aliso Niguel High as an assistant coach under his father.

In 2016, Westling was hired as head football coach at Hilltop High School. His coaching staff included former Aztec teammate DeMarco Sampson. In four seasons at Hilltop, Westling compiled a record of 28–18 and led the Lancers to three straight Metro-South Bay League titles. They also made four straight appearances in the CIF San Diego Section (CIF-SDS) Division III playoffs, including a semifinal run in 2017 despite having to play all of their home games on the road due to stadium renovations. In early 2020, Westling was hired as head football coach at Eastlake High School, where he was previously a student teacher. However, he resigned just a few weeks after accepting the role due to disagreements with the school's administration. After sitting out for the 2020 season, Westling was hired as head football coach at Mt. Carmel High School in 2021. In his first season at the helm, he led the Sundevils to a 10–2 record, a share of the Palomar League title, and an appearance in the CIF-SDS Division III semifinals.

== Personal life ==
His father, Kurt, served as the head football coach at Aliso Niguel High School from 2010 to 2019, though he was offensive coordinator when Drew played.

== Head coaching record ==
=== High school ===
Year	Team	Overall	Conference	Standing	Bowl/playoffs
Chula Vista Spartans (Metro-Mesa League) (2014)
2014	Chula Vista	2–8	0–4		
Chula Vista:		2–8	0–4		
Hilltop Lancers (Metro-South Bay League) (2016–2019)
2016	Hilltop	7–5	2–1	2nd	
2017	Hilltop	7–5	3–0	1st	
2018	Hilltop	5–6	4–0	1st	
2019	Hilltop	9–2	3–0	1st	
Hilltop:		28–18	12–1		
Mt. Carmel Sundevils (Palomar League) (2021–present)
2021	Mt. Carmel	10–2	4–1	T–1st	
2022	Mt. Carmel	6–5	2–3	4th	
2023	Mt. Carmel	3–7	0–5	6th	
2024	Mt. Carmel	6–5	2–3	4th	
Mt. Carmel:		25–19	8–12		
Total:		55–45			
National championship Conference title Conference division title or championship game berth
