= Jorge Munoz (American football) =

American football coach and former player (born 1971)

Current position
- Title: Associate head coach & tight ends coach
- Team: Louisiana
- Conference: Sun Belt

Biographical details
- Born: May 12, 1971 (age 55)
- Education: Bethany College (1998)

Playing career
- 1992–1993: Southwestern (CA)
- 1994: Utah State
- 1995–1996: Bethany (KS)
- 1997: Albany Firebirds
- Position: Quarterback

Coaching career (HC unless noted)
- 1997–1998: Bethany (QB)
- 1999–2000: Southeast Missouri State (WR)
- 2001–2002: Anderson (IN) (OC/QB/WR)
- 2004–2005: Charleston Southern (WR)
- 2005: Eastern Illinois (WR)
- 2006: Eastern Illinois (co-OC/QB)
- 2007: Eastern Illinois (OC/QB)
- 2008–2010: Louisiana–Lafayette (PGC/QB)
- 2011–2015: Louisiana–Lafayette (WR)
- 2016: Louisiana–Lafayette (OC/QB)
- 2017: Louisiana (WR)
- 2018–2019: LSU (offensive analyst)
- 2020: Baylor (PGC/WR)
- 2021: LSU (offensive analyst)
- 2022–present: Louisiana (AHC/TE)

Accomplishments and honors

Awards
- Second-team NAIA Division II All-American (1996); 2× First-team All-KCAC (1995, 1996); Mission Conference South Division Player of the Year (1993); Second-team all-Mission Conference South Division (1992)

Jorge Munoz (born May 12, 1971) is an American football coach and former player. He is the associate head coach and tight ends coach at the University of Louisiana at Lafayette. Munoz played college football at Southwestern College in Chula Vista, California, and Bethany College in Lindsborg, Kansas, as a quarterback. He also played one season with the Albany Firebirds before beginning his coaching career.

Munoz was inducted into the Southwestern College Athletic Hall of Honor in 2006 and the Bethany College Athletic Hall of Fame in 2010.

== High school career ==
Munoz attended Hilltop High School in Chula Vista, California, where he was a three-year starter at quarterback for the Lancers' run and shoot offense. His father, George, served as the team's offensive coordinator. As a junior, Munoz led San Diego County with 227 passing yards per game and earned first-team all-Metro Conference honors. However, Hilltop missed the CIF San Diego Section playoffs both of his first two seasons. As a senior in 1991, Munoz led the Lancers to an 8–2 regular season record and their first playoff berth since 1980. He threw for 298 yards and three touchdowns in their quarterfinal loss to Morse High School. Munoz was unanimously named the Metro Conference Offensive Co-Player of the Year and earned first-team all-San Diego Section honors after throwing for 2,553 yards and 25 touchdowns. He was also a first-team honoree on the Los Angeles Times All-San Diego County team.

Munoz threw for 5,712 yards and 61 touchdowns in his career, finishing second in San Diego Section history in career passing yards, behind only Jim Plum of Helix High School (father of Kelsey Plum). "It seemed like no big deal," he said. "It feels great, though, being a part of history and all." Munoz participated in the third annual San Diego County 2A-3A All-Star Football Classic at DeVore Stadium, where he completed seven-of-15 passes for 140 yards to lead the 3A team to a 17–16 win. He also played baseball as a catcher and pitcher, earning second-team all-league honors as a junior, and was a two-time all-league honorable mention in basketball.

Despite his production on the field, Munoz was not heavily recruited. "I think a lot of schools were turned away because of my size," he later said. "My size isn't mindboggling." Munoz enrolled at Southwestern College in Chula Vista to play junior college football for the Apaches.

== College career ==
=== Southwestern ===
As a freshman in 1992, Munoz lost the starting quarterback competition to sophomore Pat Aument. Munoz earned his first start in the third game of the season after an injury to Aument, throwing for 372 yards and two touchdowns in a loss to Orange Coast. He secured the starting job thereafter. In a loss to Long Beach City, Munoz completed 30-of-55 passes for 353 yards and two touchdowns, setting the school record for pass attempts in a single game. In the season finale, he set school records in completions (31), passing yards (481), and touchdowns (six) in a 64–57 win over rival Grossmont, snapping an eight-game losing streak to finish with a 2–8 record. Munoz finished the season with 2,596 passing yards and 14 touchdowns with 13 interceptions, earning second-team all-Mission Conference South Division honors.

Ahead of his sophomore season in 1993, Munoz was named a preseason junior college All-American. In the season opener, he passed for 248 yards and a touchdown in a 20–7 win over Mt. San Jacinto. The following week, Munoz threw for 406 yards and three touchdowns and added a rushing touchdown in a 47–36 win over San Bernardino Valley. Munoz subsequently injured his ankle in a loss at Mt. San Antonio. He started the next game despite a "severally [sic] sprained ankle", passing for 260 yards and two touchdowns before reaggravating his injury in a defeat to Golden West. Later that month, Munoz threw for 308 yards and two touchdowns in another loss to Cerritos. The following week against Grossmont, he passed for 404 yards and a school-record seven touchdowns in a 56–42 win which ended a five-game losing streak, surpassing his own record and marking the second-highest single-game touchdown total in conference history. In the next game, Munoz set the conference record by throwing for 566 yards in addition to five touchdowns in a 48–46 loss to San Diego Mesa. Tom Craft, the Palomar head coach at the time, called him "one of the best [he's] ever seen". In the season finale, Munoz passed for 389 yards and three touchdowns and added a rushing touchdown in a loss to Palomar, the No. 1 ranked team in the nation, as Southwestern finished with a 3–7 record. (Note: The first source incorrectly gives his passing yardage as 367.) He finished the season with 3,395 passing yards and 28 touchdowns with eight interceptions and was named the Mission Conference South Division Player of the Year. Munoz set single-season program records in passing yards, passing touchdowns, total touchdowns (29), completions (265), pass attempts (399), and completion percentage (.664). He received a scholarship offer from the University of Pittsburgh, but it was rescinded with little notice.

In two seasons with the Apaches, Munoz "rewrote virtually all of Southwestern's offensive record book", setting program career records in passing yards (5,991), passing touchdowns (42), total touchdowns (45), completions (468), pass attempts (730), completion percentage (.641), and offensive plays (848). Additionally, his 468 career completions tied Tom Luginbill for the most in junior college history. Munoz was inducted into the Southwestern College Athletic Hall of Honor in 2006.

=== Utah State ===
Munoz transferred to Utah State University in 1994, enrolling in winter-quarter classes and signing his National Letter of Intent in January. He entered a four-way quarterback competition during spring practices and threw two touchdowns on four completions in the first team scrimmage. Munoz also led the Blue team in the annual Blue-White scrimmage to close out spring practices, but was eventually named a backup to Matt Wells ahead of the Aggies' season opener. After a poor start to the season, Munoz met with head coach Charlie Weatherbie to inquire about getting a chance to play, but claimed he was told that he was "brought... for insurance purposes" and was redshirted. "I was discouraged and didn't know if I wanted to play football," he said. Munoz was arrested for theft and assault – along with teammate Scott Moore – following an incident at a local 7-Eleven on September 27, and the pair was suspended by Weatherbie ahead of their upcoming game against BYU. Munoz quit the team soon afterwards and was granted a release from his scholarship. In January 1995, he and Moore pleaded guilty to the charges. In March, they were each sentenced to 30 days in jail, fined $1,500, and ordered to pay $260 in restitution.

=== Bethany ===
==== 1995 ====
[Munoz] was poised and frequently showed he is game-wise and battle-tested.

— Bob Davidson of The Salina Journal after Munoz led Bethany to a win over rival Kansas Wesleyan in 1995

After leaving Utah State, Munoz returned to his hometown: "I basically returned home soaked in my own tears. I couldn't even watch football on TV". A contact connected him with Ted Kessinger, head football coach at Bethany College, a National Association of Intercollegiate Athletics (NAIA) Division II program in Lindsborg, Kansas. Munoz was quickly convinced to go to Kansas to run the Swedes' pass-heavy offense, enrolling at the school in January 1995 as a midyear transfer. He chose the No. 13 jersey in honor of Dan Marino and entered a five-way quarterback competition during spring practices. Munoz earned the starting role ahead of their preseason scrimmage, throwing three touchdowns in a win over Air Force Prep.

In the season opener, Munoz passed for 336 yards and four touchdowns in a 50–17 blowout win over Tabor. He threw for 199 yards and four touchdowns in just over two quarters in a 58–23 win over Friends, earning Kansas Collegiate Athletic Conference (KCAC) co-offensive player of the week honors. Munoz won the award again the following week after passing for 275 yards and three touchdowns in a 51–13 rout of the Southwestern Moundbuilders. On homecoming, he threw for 207 yards and four touchdowns in a 71–6 thumping of the Sterling Warriors. The following week, Munoz passed for 354 yards and two touchdowns in a 41–14 win over the Bethel Threshers. In their next game, he threw for 439 yards and scored five total touchdowns in a 49–21 win over Oklahoma Panhandle State, again earning KCAC offensive player of the week honors. After passing for 220 yards and three touchdowns in a 41–6 drubbing of Ottawa, Munoz threw for 263 yards and four touchdowns in a 57–0 shutout of McPherson to finish the regular season with a perfect 10–0 record. Bethany led the nation in total offense (558 yards per game) and scoring (51 points per game) as he completed 70.7 percent of passes for 2,559 yards and 29 touchdowns with five interceptions, earning first-team all-KCAC honors after guiding the Swedes to another undefeated KCAC title.

[Munoz] has great vision and a knack for getting out of trouble. He's a drop-back passer, but he can throw on the run.

— Lambuth defensive coordinator Tim Johnson prior to their NAIA playoff matchup against a Munoz-led Bethany team in 1995

Bethany faced the Benedictine Ravens in the first round of the NAIA Division II playoffs. Munoz threw three first-half interceptions, including one returned for a touchdown, but rallied the Swedes to a second-half comeback en route to a 30–29 win and finished the game with 223 passing yards and two touchdowns. However, in the quarterfinals, he threw three more interceptions, fumbled twice, and was sacked seven times (Note: The figure was alternatively reported as six sacks.) in a 63–28 loss to Lambuth. Munoz received honorable mention on the NAIA Division II All-America team.

==== 1996 ====
Jorge does a tremendous job reading coverages. He has great poise and leadership. He's always in control... He's a pure passing quarterback and a pure quarterback for a wide open offense.

— Bethany head coach Ted Kessinger on Munoz ahead of his senior season

Munoz entered his senior season in 1996 as one of 13 returning starters on the team. His receiving corps was bolstered by Bobby Lugo, his former high school and junior college teammate who was coming off a redshirt. After a season-opening loss to Hastings, Munoz passed for 271 yards and three touchdowns in a 42–7 win over Ottawa to open conference play. The following week, he threw for 463 yards and four touchdowns in just over three quarters of a 51–26 win over McPherson, earning KCAC offensive player of the week honors. In their next game, Munoz passed for 395 yards (Note: The figure was alternatively reported as 410 yards.) and two touchdowns and added a rushing touchdown in just over two quarters in a 54–14 romp of Bethel. On homecoming, he threw for 189 yards and four touchdowns in two-and-a-half quarters in a 66–7 trouncing of Sterling.

[Munoz] is a legitimate Division I player. With his experience, it's like having a coach on the field. He's good enough to know what he can and can't do.

— Kansas Wesleyan defensive coordinator Kent Kieth prior to their game against Bethany in 1996

Munoz passed for 437 yards and four touchdowns, including three to Lugo, in a 55–21 win over Friends. He then won KCAC offensive player of the week honors after throwing for 422 yards (Note: The figure was alternatively reported as 401 yards.) and five touchdowns in a 48–41 win over Southwestern. Munoz passed for 351 yards and three touchdowns in their next game, a 69–26 win over Tabor. In the regular-season finale, a 22–6 win over rival Kansas Wesleyan, he tossed two first-half touchdowns before exiting the game with a hand injury. Munoz was the top passer in NAIA Division II as he threw for 2,954 yards and 27 touchdowns with five interceptions, earning first-team all-KCAC honors. In the first round of the NAIA Division II playoffs, he passed for 418 yards and two touchdowns and added 61 yards and a touchdown on the ground, but Bethany lost to Willamette 56–35 after giving up 738 yards of total offense. Munoz was a second-team honoree on the NAIA Division II All-America team.

Munoz was inducted into the Bethany College Athletic Hall of Honor in 2010.

== Professional career ==
In April 1997, Munoz signed with the Albany Firebirds of the Arena Football League (AFL). He served in a reserve role and was deactivated a month later.

== Coaching career ==
As a senior at Bethany in 1996, Munoz expressed an interest in coaching after obtaining his degree. "To start off, I'll probably be a grad assistant somewhere. I don't know where... but definitely not Utah State," he said, alluding to his time at the school as a player. After his playing career, Munoz returned to Bethany in 1997 as the team's quarterbacks coach. From 1999 to 2000, he served as wide receivers coach at Southeast Missouri State. From 2001 to 2002, Munoz was the offensive coordinator, quarterbacks coach, and wide receivers coach at Anderson University in Anderson, Indiana, leading the Ravens to a Heartland Collegiate Athletic Conference title. After a two-year stint as the wide receivers coach at Charleston Southern University from 2003 to 2004, he was hired in the same role at Eastern Illinois University in 2005 under head coach Bob Spoo. Munoz was moved to quarterbacks coach ahead of the 2006 season. He also undertook play-calling duties to assist offensive coordinator and acting head coach Mark Hutson after Spoo was sidelined by surgery. As co-offensive coordinator, Munoz helped the team win a share of the Ohio Valley Conference title. In 2007, he was officially promoted to offensive coordinator while retaining the title of quarterbacks coach following Huston's departure for Tulane. That season, he helped the Panthers achieve an 8–4 record and earn their third straight NCAA playoff berth.

=== Louisiana–Lafayette (first stint) ===
[Munoz is] just so detail-oriented, and his passion to win and to be great is as much as anyone else I’ve ever seen.

— Michael Desormeaux, Louisiana–Lafayette quarterback under Munoz who later returned to the team as a coach

After three seasons at Eastern Illinois, Munoz was hired at the University of Louisiana at Lafayette in 2008 as passing game coordinator and quarterbacks coach, moving up to the NCAA Division I Football Bowl Subdivision (FBS) level. He was given play-calling duties and was tasked with shifting the Ragin' Cajuns away from their run-heavy offense, which ranked seventh nationally in rushing and 115th in passing the previous year. In his first season at the school, Munoz helped the team set program records for total offense (5,390 yards), passing offense (3,503 yards), and touchdowns (54) under head coach Rickey Bustle as quarterback Michael Desormeaux won the Sun Belt Offensive Player of the Year award. When Bustle was fired following the 2010 season, Munoz was let go by incoming head coach Mark Hudspeth. However, he was later called back by Hudspeth and offered the position of wide receivers coach, which he accepted. That year, Munoz helped the Ragin' Cajuns to a win over San Diego State in the 2011 New Orleans Bowl, which was their first-ever bowl game appearance as an FBS program. This was the first of four straight victories in the New Orleans Bowl. Munoz helped the offense set further program records for total offense (5,914 yards) in 2012 and touchdowns (59) in 2013.

After five seasons in charge of the receivers, Munoz was promoted to offensive coordinator and quarterbacks coach in February 2016. Former Ragin' Cajuns quarterback Michael Desormeaux was brought on as an assistant. Munoz self-described his offensive principles as a "spread-you-out-to run-it type of philosophy". Ahead of the season opener, he was given play-calling duties as well by Hudspeth, who had previously floated the idea of calling plays himself. Munoz received praise from Hudspeth at multiple points during the season for his game-plan creativity. The Ragin' Cajuns were invited to the 2016 New Orleans Bowl, where they lost to Southern Miss. In 2017, Munoz was moved back to his former position of wide receivers coach amidst a series of staff changes. He was replaced at offensive coordinator by Will Hall, who previously played under Hudspeth at North Alabama. Munoz was part of the staff that fired the day after their 2017 season-ending loss to Appalachian State.

=== LSU and Baylor ===
[Munoz has] meant so much to me. He helps me get those third-down blitzes picked up every week. So many teams have super-exotic packages, and he narrows it down to one, two, three things that my eyes have to look at so I can get these blitzes picked up.

— Joe Burrow during his Heisman Trophy-winning season in 2019

In 2018, Munoz was hired at Louisiana State University as an offensive analyst for the Tigers under head coach Ed Orgeron, his first job at a Power Five program. He was one of the highest paid analysts on the team and specialized in blitz protections, creating game plans for offensive line coach James Cregg. In 2019, Munoz helped the Tigers to a record-setting national title-winning season. He played a key role in the development of Heisman Trophy-winner Joe Burrow and attended the trophy ceremony in New York City, where he was thanked by Burrow in his acceptance speech. "It was just a magical season," Munoz later said. "I think it was a season that you can never replicate again. There was just the perfect storm, the perfect blend of the players, of the staff, of the style of offense that we implemented..."

In 2020, Munoz was a seriously considered for the offensive coordinator job at the University of Oregon before was hired at Baylor University as passing game coordinator and wide receivers coach under head coach Dave Aranda. However, according to Shehan Jeyarajah of Dave Campbell's Texas Football, splitting pass and run game responsibilities between Munoz and offensive coordinator Larry Fedora "simply did not work at Baylor". Both coaches were let go after the season, which was plagued by COVID-19 pandemic-related issues.

After one season at Baylor, Munoz returned to his position as an offensive analyst at LSU in 2021.

=== Louisiana (second stint) ===
In 2022, Munoz was named associate head coach and tight ends coach at Louisiana (previously Louisiana–Lafayette) under head coach Michael Desormeaux, who called Munoz "one of the key building blocks in the history of the Louisiana football program". He had mentored Desormeaux as his quarterbacks coach at Louisiana and brought him onto the Ragin' Cajun coaching staff during his stint as offensive coordinator in 2016.

== Personal life ==
Munoz earned his bachelor's degree in physical education from Bethany in May 1998. He and his wife, Erin, have two children: Ava and Alex. After 10 years in Lafayette, Louisiana, the family struggled adjusting to Baton Rouge after his move to LSU. "For the first year, my son kept wearing Ragin’ Cajun gear even though I was at LSU now," reflected Munoz. Alex plays quarterback at Teurlings Catholic High School in Lafayette.

Munoz became close friends with Steve Barrows, who coached him at Bethany. "He was a stud," said Barrows of Munoz. "I call him the best I've ever coached... He was a coach on the field for us." Munoz went on to coach under Barrows at Anderson and the two were on the same coaching staff at Charleston Southern. The pair later faced off against one other in 2007 as opposing coordinators, with Munoz leading the offense at Eastern Illinois and Barrows leading the defense at Indiana State.
