= Ed Carberry =

American football coach (born 1953/54)

Biographical details
- Born: 1953 or 1954 (age 72–73)

Playing career
- 1973–1974: Cerritos
- Position: Center

Coaching career (HC unless noted)

Football
- 1978–1980: Bishop Montgomery HS (CA) (assistant)
- 1981: Los Angeles Harbor (assistant)
- 1982–1983: St. Anthony HS (CA)
- 1984–1987: Tustin HS (CA) (OC)
- 1988: Tustin HS (CA) (DC)
- 1989–1999: Monte Vista HS (CA)
- 2000: Grossmont (DC)
- 2001–2003: Monte Vista HS (CA)
- 2004–2006: Mt. San Jacinto
- 2007–2021: Southwestern (CA)

Track and field
- 1985–1986: Tustin HS (CA)

Baseball
- 1981: Daniel Murphy HS (CA)

Administrative career (AD unless noted)
- 1981–1982: Mary Star of the Sea HS (CA)

Head coaching record
- Overall: 107–71 (junior college football); 101–74–2 (high school football); 3–12 (high school baseball)
- Bowls: 5–3

Accomplishments and honors

Championships
- 4 American Mountain (2008, 2012, 2016, 2017); 2 CIF San Diego Section (1995, 2003); 7 Grossmont League (1993–1995, 1997–1999, 2001)

Awards
- 2 CCCFCA Region V Coach of the Year (2012, 2017); 3 American Mountain Coach of the Year (2012, 2016, 2017); 7 Grossmont League Coach of the Year

Ed Carberry (born 1953/54) is an American former college football coach. He was the head football coach for St. Anthony High School from 1982 to 1983, Monte Vista High School from 1989 to 2003, Mt. San Jacinto College from 2004 to 2006, and Southwestern College in Chula Vista, California, from 2007 to 2021. Carberry also coached for Bishop Montgomery High School, Los Angeles Harbor, and Tustin High School. He played college football for Cerritos as a center.

Carberry was inducted into the St. Paul High Hall of Fame in 2015, the Monte Vista High Hall of Fame in 2017, and the California Community College Football Coaches Association Hall of Fame in 2025.

== Early life and playing career ==
Ed Carberry was born in 1953 or 1954 and grew up in Whittier, California. He attended St. Paul High School in Santa Fe Springs, where he played football under head coach Marijon Ancich as a center, winning the 1972 CIF Southern Section title. Carberry went on to play college football for Cerritos as a center, being listed at 220 lb (100 kg). He was elected to the school's student senate as a freshman in 1973.

== Coaching career ==
From 1978 to 1980, Carberry served as an assistant football coach for Bishop Montgomery High School. In 1981, he served as the head baseball coach at Daniel Murphy High School, leading the team to a 3–12 record, as well as an assistant football coach for Los Angeles Harbor. In 1982, Carberry was named head football coach at St. Anthony High School, taking over a rebuilding team with only one returning starter. He led the Saints to a 1–15–1 record over two seasons.

In 1984, Carberry accepted the job as the offensive coordinator at Tustin High School under his former high school coach, Marijon Ancich. He was credited by Ancich for improving the team's weight training program. After four seasons as offensive coordinator, Carberry was moved to defensive coordinator in 1988. "It felt like I had come full circle, coming from a player to a coach under Marijon. It was something I always wanted to do because he's such a great coach. Ninety percent of what I am as a coach comes from playing for and coaching with Marijon," he said. During his tenure at Tustin, Carberry also served as head coach of the track and field team from 1985 to 1986.

=== Monte Vista ===
In 1989, Carberry was hired as head football coach at Monte Vista High School. In 1992, he led the Monte Vista Monarchs to their first playoff victory in 17 years, defeating Chula Vista High School in the first round of the CIF San Diego Section (CIF-SDS) playoffs. In 1995, Carberry guided Monte Vista to a 12–1 record and a CIF-SDS Division II championship, beating Escondido High School at Jack Murphy Stadium for their first title in school history. The team featured future NFL player Michael Wiley. Monte Vista once again compiled a 12–1 record in 1999, but lost in the CIF-SDS title game. After a one-year stint as the defensive coordinator at Grossmont College in 2000, Carberry returned to Monte Vista in 2001. That season, they beat a Helix High School team starring Reggie Bush and Alex Smith, handing them their only loss of the season despite Bush rushing for 316 yards. "These kids believed all week we could do it, and I’ll be darned if they didn’t," said Carberry. In 2003, he guided the Monarchs to a 10–2–1 record and another CIF-SDS Division II championship, defeating Helix in the final at the renamed Qualcomm Stadium.

In 14 seasons at Monte Vista, Carberry led the Monarchs to two CIF-SDS championships, seven league crowns, and 11 playoff berths. He compiled a record of 100–59–1, becoming just the third football coach in the history of the Grossmont Union High School District to amass 100 wins at one school, and was honored as a seven-time Grossmont League Coach of the Year. Gary Watkins Jr., who played at Monte Vista in the early 2000s under Carberry and later coached against him in the junior college ranks, facetiously described the discipline he imposed on his players as "almost paramilitary".

=== Mt. San Jacinto ===
In 2004, Carberry was hired as head football coach at Mt. San Jacinto College. In an effort to attract untapped talent from south Riverside County, he hired assistants with ties to the area and moved some of the team's practices to the school's more centralized Menifee campus to increase exposure. "This gives us a chance to get out in the middle of the district and see and be seen," said Carberry. "We wanted to take the show on the road." The move was praised by athletic director John Chambers. Ahead of Carberry's second season at Mt. San Jacinto in 2005, the team landed two NCAA Division I transfers who went to high school in the area: quarterback Matt Ticich (San Diego) and wide receiver Chris Kehne (Idaho). That season, he led the Eagles to an 8–3 record and a berth in the Beach Bowl, where they lost to Saddleback. Mt. San Jacinto posted a 7–3 record in 2006, but did not receive a bowl game berth.

In three seasons at Mt. San Jacinto, Carberry compiled a record of 19–12.

=== Southwestern ===
You want to see them at 35 years old have their 2.5 kids and a job that they like to do. It’s not MTV and it’s not ESPN, but it’s life, and about getting out there and being successful.

— Carberry on his motivations as a coach

In 2007, Carberry was hired as head football coach at Southwestern College in Chula Vista, California. In his first season with the team, he led the Jaguars to a 3–6 record. However, they won three of their last four games, including a 20–17 upset of previously undefeated Antelope Valley in their season finale. In 2008, Southwestern joined the newly-formed Southern California Football Association and ended their nine-year losing streak against local rival Grossmont with a 14–10 win at home. Carberry led the Jaguars to an American Mountain Conference co-championship, which they shared with San Diego Mesa, as well as a berth in the inaugural Tremblay Financial Services Bowl, where they lost to Pasadena. However, this initial success was followed by three straight losing seasons from 2009 to 2011. The 2011 squad included "Big Wave" Dave Wade, a 55-year-old carpenter who "clothesline[d] a guy" during a kickoff on his only play of the year, according to Carberry. "And none of the officials threw a flag because they knew he was 55 years old," he recalled.

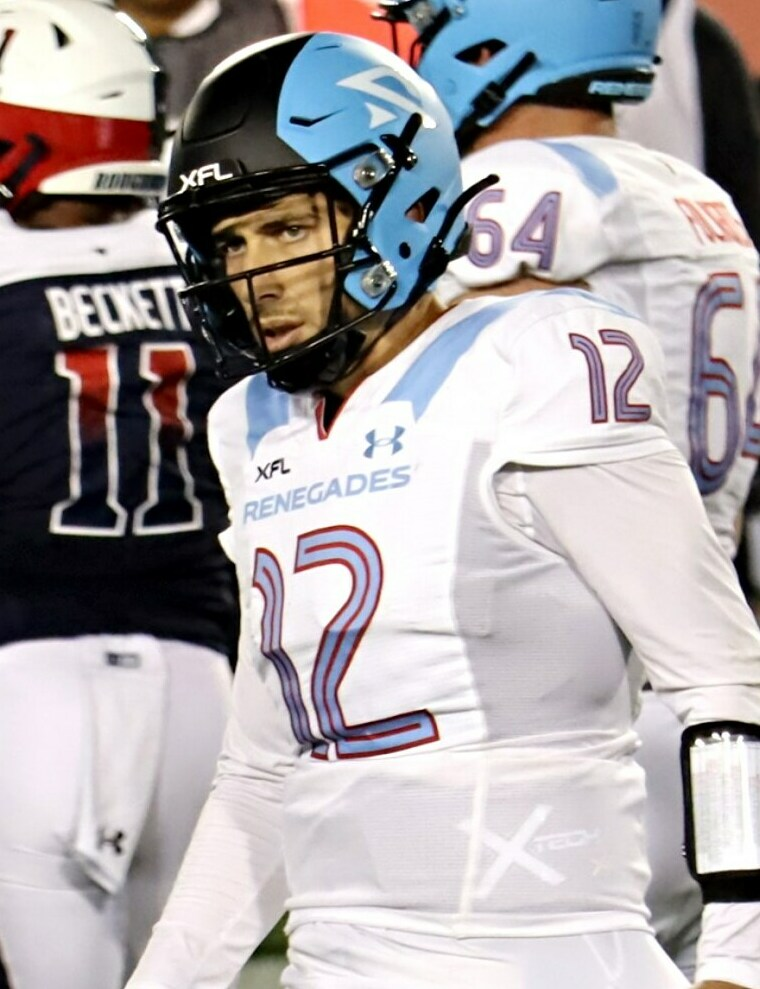
Carberry coached quarterback Luis Perez at Southwestern College.

In 2012, Carberry led Southwestern to a 10–1 record and a conference title, as well as a victory over Santa Monica in the American Bowl. He was named the American Mountain Conference Coach of the Year and the CCCFCA Region V Coach of the Year. In 2013, the Jaguars went 9–2 and defeated San Bernardino Valley in the Patriotic Bowl. In 2014, Carberry led the team to a 10–1 record and a win over Santa Monica in the American Bowl, setting a school record with three consecutive bowl game victories. Jaguars quarterback Luis Perez later won the Harlon Hill Trophy at Texas A&M–Commerce. Carberry's resurrection of the program – as described by Tod Leonard of The San Diego Union-Tribune – led the school to commit to a multimillion-dollar renovation of their home stadium, DeVore Stadium, which was "transformed... into one of the best community college home fields in the country" upon its completion ahead of the 2014 season.

In 2016, Carberry guided Southwestern to a 9–2 record and a share of American Mountain Conference title; they lost to Los Angeles Valley in the American Bowl. In 2017, the Jaguars posted an undefeated conference record en route to another conference title, qualifying them for the American Bowl, where they beat Allan Hancock. Carberry was named the conference coach of the year both in 2016 and 2017, as well as the 2017 CCCFCA Region IV Coach of the Year. He led Southwestern to a win over local rivals Palomar in the 2018 Beach Bowl followed by a defeat to Long Beach City in the 2019 Southern California Bowl. However, the 2020 season was cancelled due to the COVID-19 pandemic and its effects lingered into 2021, impacting player availability and recruiting. Carberry led the Jaguars to a 3–7 record in his final season, which he described as "brutal," before announcing his retirement in February 2022. "I was lucky enough to hit the nail with a hammer for 45 years, and now I’m lucky enough to know the right time to get out," he said. "COVID and other things wore me down."

In 14 seasons at Southwestern, Carberry compiled an 88–59 record, including 5–3 in bowl games. He finished his career with the most coaching wins in program history.

== Administrative career ==
In mid-1981, Carberry was hired as the athletic director (AD) for Mary Star of the Sea High School, allowing incumbent AD Joe Radisich to focus on his head football coaching duties. He served in the position until 1982, when he was hired as the head football coach for St. Anthony High School.

== Personal life ==
Carberry is married to Dianne Carberry, an academic administrator who served as principal of Orange Glen High School, and they have a daughter named Maegan. The couple enjoys traveling, especially visiting historic baseball stadiums and attending college football rivalry games. During his stint at Monte Vista, Carberry lived in Encinitas, California.

== Head coaching record ==
=== Junior college ===
Year	Team	Overall	Conference	Standing	Bowl/playoffs
Mt. San Jacinto Eagles (Foothill Conference) (2004–2006)
2004	Mt. San Jacinto	4–6	4–4	5th	
2005	Mt. San Jacinto	8–3	6–2	3rd	L Beach Bowl
2006	Mt. San Jacinto	7–3	5–3	4th	
Mt. San Jacinto:		19–12	15–9		
Southwestern Jaguars (Foothill Conference) (2007)
2007	Southwestern	3–6	3–4	6th	
Southwestern Jaguars (American Mountain Conference / League) (2008–2009)
2008	Southwestern	7–4	6–1	T–1st	L Tremblay Financial Services Bowl
2009	Southwestern	4–6	3–4	5th	
Southwestern Jaguars (Central East Conference) (2010–2011)
2010	Southwestern	3–7	0–5	6th	
2011	Southwestern	4–6	0–5	6th	
Southwestern Jaguars (American Mountain Conference / League) (2012–2017)
2012	Southwestern	10–1	7–0	1st	W American Bowl
2013	Southwestern	9–2	6–1	2nd	W Patriotic Bowl
2014	Southwestern	10–1	6–1	2nd	W American Bowl
2015	Southwestern	4–6	3–4	5th	
2016	Southwestern	9–2	4–1	T–1st	L American Bowl
2017	Southwestern	9–2	5–0	1st	W American Bowl
Southwestern Jaguars (National Southern League) (2018–2021)
2018	Southwestern	7–4	2–3	4th	W Beach Bowl
2019	Southwestern	6–5	2–3	4th	L Southern California Bowl
2020	No team—COVID-19				
2021	Southwestern	3–7	1–4	T–5th	
Southwestern:		88–59	48–36		
Total:		107–71			
National championship Conference title Conference division title or championship game berth

=== High school ===
Year	Team	Overall	Conference	Standing	Bowl/playoffs
St. Anthony Saints (Camino Real League) (1982–1983)
1982	St. Anthony	1–7	1–6	8th	
1983	St. Anthony	0–8–1	0–7	8th	
St. Anthony:		1–15–1	1–13		
Monte Vista Monarchs (Grossmont 3-A League) (1989–1992)
1989	Monte Vista	6–5	2–2	T–2nd	L CIF–SDS Division II first round
1990	Monte Vista	1–9	0–4	5th	
1991	Monte Vista	5–5	2–2	3rd	
1992	Monte Vista	7–5	3–1	2nd	L CIF–SDS Division II quarterfinal
Monte Vista Monarchs (Grossmont 2-A League) (1993–1994)
1993	Monte Vista	7–4	4–0	1st	L CIF–SDS Division II first round
1994	Monte Vista	8–3	4–0	1st	L CIF–SDS Division II quarterfinal
Monte Vista Monarchs (Grossmont South League) (1995–present)
1995	Monte Vista	12–1	4–0	1st	W CIF–SDS Division II championship
1996	Monte Vista	3–7	1–3	4th	
1997	Monte Vista	4–7	3–1	1st	L CIF–SDS Division II first round
1998	Monte Vista	7–4	4–0	1st	L CIF–SDS Division II quarterfinal
1999	Monte Vista	12–1	4–0	1st	L CIF–SDS Division II championship
2001	Monte Vista	10–2	4–0	1st	L CIF–SDS Division II semifinal
2002	Monte Vista	8–4	4–1	2nd	L CIF–SDS Division II semifinal
2003	Monte Vista	10–2–1	3–1–1	2nd	W CIF–SDS Division II championship
Monte Vista:		100–59–1	42–15–1		
Total:		101–74–2			
National championship Conference title Conference division title or championship game berth
