= Scott Byers =

American football player (born 1958)

No. 42, 30, 26
- Position: Defensive back

Personal information
- Born: July 3, 1958 (age 68); Bayonne, New Jersey, U.S.
- Listed height: 5 ft 11 in (1.80 m)
- Listed weight: 170 lb (77 kg)

Career information
- High school: Abraham Lincoln (San Diego, California)
- College: Southwestern (CA) (1976–1977); Long Beach State (1978–1979)
- NFL draft: 1980: undrafted

Career history
- Long Beach Mustangs (1980); Orange County Rhinos (1981); San Diego Chargers (1982)*; Los Angeles Express (1983); Los Angeles Rams (1984)*; San Diego Chargers (1984); Portland Breakers (1985); Montreal Alouettes (1986)*
- * Offseason or practice squad member only
- Stats at Pro Football Reference

Norman Scott Byers (born July 3, 1958) is an American former professional football player who was a defensive back for one season with the San Diego Chargers of the National Football League (NFL). He played college football at Southwestern Junior College and Long Beach State

== Early life and college ==
Norman Scott Byers was born on July 3, 1958, in Bayonne, New Jersey. He attended Chula Vista High School in Chula Vista, California and Abraham Lincoln High School in San Diego, California.

Byers played college football for the Southwestern Apaches of Southwestern College from 1976 to 1977. He played for the Long Beach State 49ers of Long Beach State University from 1978 to 1979.

== Professional career ==
After going undrafted in 1980 NFL draft, Byers played in the California Football League for the Long Beach Mustangs and Orange County Rhinos in 1980 and 1981, respectively.

Byers signed with the San Diego Chargers on April 23, 1982. He was released on September 6, 1982.

Byers was signed by the Los Angeles Express of the United States Football League (USFL) on November 8, 1982. He started the first six games of the 1983 USFL season, recording one sack and two interceptions, before being placed on injured reserve on April 16, 1983. He was released by the Express on February 16, 1984.

Byers signed with the Los Angeles Rams on April 3, 1984. He was released by the Rams on August 21, 1984.

Byers was signed by the San Diego Chargers on October 17, 1984. He was released on November 14, re-signed on November 15, and released again on December 3, 1984. Overall, he played in six games for the Chargers during the 1984 season.

Byers signed with the Portland Breakers of the USFL on January 23, 1985. He totaled three interceptions for the Breakers during the 1985 season.

He signed with the Montreal Alouettes in 1986 but was later released.
