= Shelby Park =

Shelby Park may refer to:

- Shelby Park, Louisville, Kentucky, USA
- Shelby Park (Eagle Pass), Texas, USA
- Shelby Park (Nashville), Tennessee, USA
