= Southwestern College (California) =

Community college in Chula Vista, California, US

Coordinates: 32°38′25.25″N 116°59′48.50″W

- The logo of Southwestern College
- Type: Public community college
- Established: 1961
- President: Mark Sanchez
- Undergraduates: 27,000 + (2015)
- Location: Chula Vista, California, United States
- Campus: Suburban, 156 acres (63 ha)
- Athletics: 15 teams
- Colors: Gold & Maroon
- Mascot: Jaguars
- Website: www.swccd.edu

Southwestern College is a public community college in Chula Vista, California. It was founded in 1961. It is part of the Southwestern Community College District, itself a part of the California Community Colleges system. It has an enrollment of 25,228 across all its campuses within San Diego County, as of 2023. It is accredited by the Accrediting Commission for Community and Junior Colleges.

== History ==
The school opened as Southwestern Junior College in 1961 with William Kepley as its president. The dean of admissions was Saxon Wright. The Chula Vista Star-News reported that 15 students had registered within the first half hour the dean of admission's office was open, with Oliver Pittenger, a graduate of the nearby Chula Vista High School being the first person to enroll.

In 2022–2023, enrollment exceeded 25,000 students across all campuses.

== Academics ==
The Student Services Center on the school's main campus in Chula Vista

The campus is a feeder school for students hoping to transfer to the two local public universities, the University of California, San Diego and San Diego State University, and also private institutions.

In 2021, Southwestern was chosen as one of the eight campuses in the state to offer a "competency-based" associate's degree program without the need for grades or mandatory attendance on the student's part. Southwestern chose auto tech to be the degree they offer under this program.

=== Specialty programs ===
In August 2025, Southwestern College partnered with the Sweetwater Union High School District to establish the Options Middle College High School (OMCHS), a WASC-accredited public high school located on the Southwestern College campus in Chula Vista. With an inaugural class of 55 students in grades 11–12. It is the first high school in the South Bay region to be located on a college campus. The program allows students to earn college credit from Southwestern College while completing their high school diploma.

== Athletics ==
The exterior of DeVore Stadium at Southwestern College

Southwestern College is a founding member of the Pacific Coast Athletic Conference (PCAC) and competes in 11 intercollegiate sports, including:

- Baseball
- Basketball
- Southwestern Jaguars football
- Cross country
- Soccer
- Softball
- Tennis
- Track and field
- Water polo
- Volleyball
- Swimming and diving

The college's athletic teams are known as the Jaguars. From 1961 until 2001, the teams were represented by the Apaches mascot.

Southwestern College's football stadium also serves as the home field for Bonita Vista High School football games.

=== Facilities ===
One of the tennis courts on the Chula Vista campus

The campus features a variety of athletic facilities, including:

- Artificial turf football field
- Half-size artificial turf practice field
- Baseball stadium
- Dirt running track
- Soccer field
- Softball field
- Football stadium with weight room overlooking the field
- Outdoor swimming pool
- Basketball gymnasium
- Five full-size tennis courts

Many of these facilities are also utilized during the week and weekends as youth soccer fields for players aged 6–18.

== Notable alumni ==
- Mike Banks, law enforcement officer
- Brian Bilbray, former Congressman
- Marshall Boze, professional baseball player
- Scott Byers, professional football player
- Ammar Campa-Najjar (born 1989), Democratic politician
- Vinny Curran, actor
- Fernando A. Fisher, short film director
- John Fox, professional football coach
- Kevin Ginkel, professional baseball player
- John Jaso, professional baseball player
- Dan La Botz, Socialist activist/politician, historian, labor leader
- Curtis Mitchell (born 1989), American sprinter
- Marco Morales, professional football player
- Bianca Mora,professional soccer player
- Jorge Munoz, professional football player
- Dominik Mysterio, professional wrestler
- Ogemdi Nwagbuo, professional football player
- Ookay, singer and DJ
- Rafael Peralta, Navy Cross recipient
- Luis Perez, XFL quarterback
- Steve Pierce, professional football player
- Travis Taijeron, professional baseball player
- Oliver Ross, professional football player
- J. Michael Straczynski, writer and television producer
- Julieta Venegas, singer
- Yvonne Venegas, photographer
- Tom Waits, singer, songwriter, musician
- Drew Westling, football coach and former player

== Notable staff ==
- Claude Gilbert (1966) Head football coach
- Bob Mears (1976–1989) Head football coach
- Ed Carberry (2007–2021) Head football coach
- Oscar Rodriguez (2024–present) Head football coach
- Drew Westling football coach
- Philam Garcia, head sprinting coach
