= Fernando A. Fisher =

Mexican American short film director

- Born: San Diego, California, US
- Occupations: Director, Writer, Editor
- Years active: 2016–Present
- Notable work: Entre las Cuerdas, Perturbado (2019), La Faraona (2019), El Amor No Existe - Love Doesn't Exist (2019)
- Children: 2
- Website: filmfreeway.com/fernandofisher

Fernando A. Fisher is a Mexican American filmmaker and actor from Tijuana, Baja California. He is known for his work as a director, writer, and editor in short films and independent cinema. Fisher's films have been selected for film festivals internationally.

== Early life and education ==
Fisher was born in San Diego, California, and grew up in Tijuana, Baja California. He studied Telemedia Production at Southwestern College in San Diego.

== Career ==
Fisher began making short films in Tijuana during the early 2010s. In 2017, his short film Nite Time was selected for the Un Mundo Extraño section of the San Diego Latino Film Festival. Fisher said at the time that he primarily worked in the horror genre.

== Selected filmography ==
Table featuring films by Fernando A. Fisher
| Year | Title | Director | Writer | Producer | Editor | Notes |
|---|---|---|---|---|---|---|
| 2014 | Women of the Night | Yes | Yes | Unknown | Unknown | |
| 2015 | Nite Time | Yes | Yes | Unknown | Unknown | |
| 2015 | Cuestión de Suerte (A Matter of Luck) | Yes | Yes | Unknown | Unknown | |
| 2018 | El Amor No Existe (Love Doesn't Exist) | Yes | Yes | Yes | No | |
| 2019 | Perturbado (Disturbed) | Yes | Yes | Yes | No | |
| 2019 | La Faraona | No | No | No | Yes | |
| 2024 | Entre las Cuerdas (Amongst The Ropes) | Yes | Yes | Yes | No | |
| 2026 | Nunca Más (Never Again) | Yes | Yes | Unknown | Unknown | |

== Awards and nominations ==
| Year | Work | Award | Festival or organization | Result |
|---|---|---|---|---|
| 2020 | Perturbado | Best Horror Short | Horrible Imaginings Film Festival | Won |
| 2020 | Perturbado | Best Actor | Horrible Imaginings Film Festival | Won |
| 2021 | Perturbado | Best Short Film | Purgatory Film Festival | Won |
| 2021 | Perturbado | Best Actor | Purgatory Film Festival | Won |
| 2021 | Perturbado | Mejor Short Film | Open Window International Film Festival Challenge | Won |
| 2021 | Perturbado | Best Short Film | San Diego International Film Festival | Won |
| 2018 | El amor no existe | Best Supporting Actor | Rainbow Umbrella Film Festival | Won |
| 2018 | El amor no existe | Semi-finalist | Independent Talents International Film Festival | Nominated |
| 2023 | El amor no existe | Best Original Story | Mexica Film Awards | Won |
| 2024 | Entre las cuerdas | Audience Choice Winner | Lift-Off Global Network | Won |
| 2024 | Entre las cuerdas | Best Director – Feature Film | Luleå International Film Festival | Won |
| 2024 | Entre las cuerdas | Best Feature Film | Luleå International Film Festival | Won |
