= Special Advisor on Border Matters to the Governor of Texas and Texas Border Czar =

Texas government position

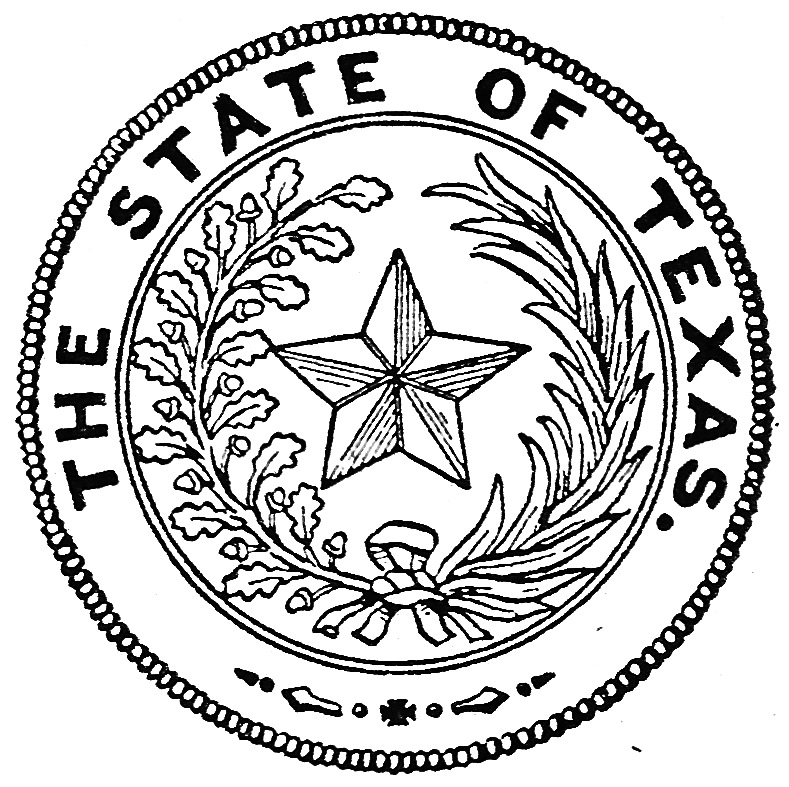

- Incumbent; Vacant
- Reports to: Governor of Texas
- Seat: Weslaco, Texas
- Appointer: Governor of Texas
- Inaugural holder: Yes
- Website: https://x.com/texasborderczar

In 2023, Texas Governor Greg Abbott, created the position of Special Advisor on Border Matters to the Governor of Texas and Texas Border Czar (or simply Texas Border Czar). Reporting directly to the governor, the position ensures state agencies execute border security strategies.

== History ==
The position was created in January 2023 by Texas Governor Greg Abbott as part of his administration's broader efforts under Operation Lone Star, a state-led initiative launched in 2021 to combat illegal immigration and criminal activity at the U.S.–Mexico border. Governor Abbott announced the appointment of Mike Banks, a former U.S. Border Patrol agent with over 20 years of experience, as the first individual to hold the role.

== Duties and responsibilities ==
The Special Advisor on Border Matters reports directly to the Governor and serves as the Governor's top liaison on border issues. Core responsibilities include:

- Coordinating state and local law enforcement agencies involved in border operations.
- Advising the Governor on strategic border security policy and legislative matters.
- Engaging with federal authorities, including U.S. Customs and Border Protection (CBP) and Immigration and Customs Enforcement (ICE).
- Overseeing components of Operation Lone Star, including the deployment of the Texas National Guard and the Department of Public Safety (DPS).
- Monitoring and assessing security threats related to transnational criminal organizations, human trafficking, and drug smuggling.
- Conducting site visits and assessments along the Texas border to inform policy decisions.
- Communicating with the public and media regarding the state's border security strategy.

== Officeholders ==
No.	Name	Term of office	Appointed by	Previous occupation
1	Mike Banks	January 30, 2023 – January 21, 2025	Greg Abbott	United States Border Patrol Acting Deputy Chief of Law Enforcement Operational Programs and Agent-in-charge (USBP) Weslaco Station. Appointed by Donald Trump as 27th Chief of the United States Border Patrol.
