= Lee Kohse =

American artist

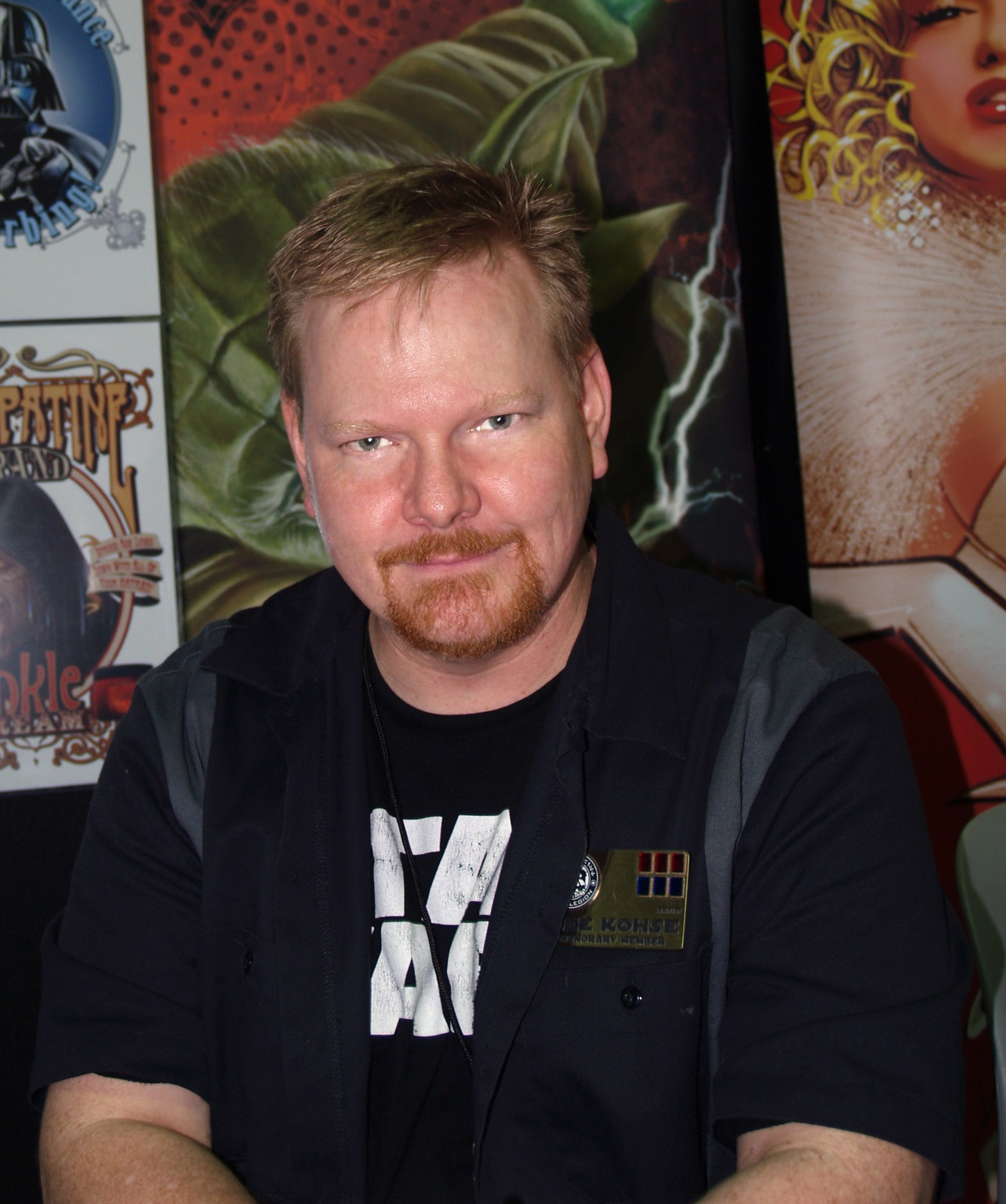
- Kohse at the New York Comic Con in Manhattan, New York on October 10, 2014
- Born: March 20, 1974 (age 52); Crescent City, California, United States
- Occupations: Illustrator, comic book artist
- Writing career
- Genres: Industrial, goth, fantasy
- Notable work: Kindergoth
- Movement: Alternative comics
- Website: www.kohse.com

Lee Kohse (born March 20, 1974, in Crescent City, California) is an American portrait artist best known for his work in the entertainment industry, most notably as an artist for Lucasfilm working on Star Wars projects and as a Partnered Creative Twitch Streamer. Kohse has also worked as a comic book writer/artist.

== Early life ==
He attended Chula Vista High School from 1989 to 1992 with the comic colorist and fellow BloodFire Studios artist Jeromy Cox.

== Bibliography ==
- Dark Tarot (artist) - BloodFire Studios (1999–2002)
- Kindergoth: Tiny Green Men (writer) - BloodFire Studios (2002–2003)
- Kindergoth: Cafeteria Havoc (writer/colorist) - BloodFire Studios (2004)
- Tenth Muse Vol 2 #10 (cover) - Bluewater Productions (2005)
- Tenth Muse Trade Paperback - Bluewater Productions (2005)
- Old Friends (covers) - IDW Publishing (2005–2006)
- Lord of the Rings Masterpieces (sketch cards) - Topps (2006)
- Shrek the Third Trading Cards (sketch cards) - Inkworks (2007)
- Aliens vs Predator Trading Cards (sketch cards) - Inkworks (2007)
- Heroes Trading Cards (sketch cards) - Topps (2007)
- Lord of the Rings Masterpieces II Trading Cards (sketch cards) - Topps (2008)
- Doctor Who Trading Cards (sketch cards) - Inkworks (2008)
- Indiana Jones (2008)
- Star Wars Clone Wars - Topps (2008)
- Indiana Jones Masterpieces Trading Cards - Topps (2008)
- DNA Hacker Chronicles, co-artist with Matt Olson - BloodFire Studios (2008–2009)
- But Not Gino, (Artist) - Blue Sneaker Press (2013) ISBN 978-1-943198-00-9

== Exhibitions and performances ==
- Gallery Provocateur Chicago (2012)
- Comic-Con International (2017)

== Awards ==
In 2024, Kohse would be a recipient of the Inkpot Award at the annual San Diego Comic Con.
