= Mike Banks (law enforcement officer) =

American law enforcement chief

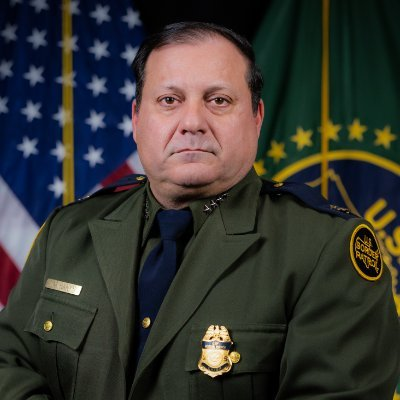
- Official portrait, 2025

Chief of the United States Border Patrol
- In office January 21, 2025 – May 14, 2026
- President: Donald Trump
- Preceded by: Jason Owens
- Succeeded by: Rosario 'Pete' Vasquez

Special Advisor on Border Matters to the Governor of Texas and Texas Border Czar
- In office January 30, 2023 – January 21, 2025
- Governor: Greg Abbott
- Preceded by: Office established
- Succeeded by: Office abolished

Personal details
- Born: Mercedes, Texas, U.S.
- Education: Southwestern College (AS); South Texas College (BASc)

Military service
- Allegiance: United States
- Branch/service: United States Navy
- Years of service: 1990-2000

Michael W. Banks is an American law enforcement officer who served as the 27th chief of the United States Border Patrol from 2025 to 2026. Previously, he served as the first Texas border czar.

== Early life ==
Banks attended Southwestern College in Chula Vista, California, where he received an associate's degree in administration of justice, and South Texas College, where he earned a Bachelor of Applied Science and organizational leadership. He served for 10 years in the United States Navy as a Master-at-arms.

== Career ==
After his service in the Navy, Banks joined the United States Border Patrol in 2000. Graduated from the Border Patrol Academy at the Federal Law Enforcement Training Center in Glynco, Georgia and his first duty station was in Calexico, California. Went to serve in various positions in over 25 years of experience. He held leadership positions in Texas, Arizona, and California, and was the McAllen Station patrol agent in charge and the Rio Grande Valley Sector executive officer and acting division chief. He later was the acting deputy chief of operations for the border patrol headquarters in Washington, D.C., and after that, was the head agent for the station in Weslaco.

Banks retired from the Border Patrol in January 2023, due to disagreements with the immigration policies of President Joe Biden. Shortly after he retired, he was named by Texas Governor Greg Abbott as the state's first border czar on January 30, 2023. Abbott said that he hired Banks to "tap his expertise to deploy strategies that reduce illegal immigration and keep our community safe," and tasked him with helping build the border wall. He was an advisor to the governor for the border and assisted in Operation Lone Star, the state government's operation to control the U.S.–Mexico border.

On January 16, 2025, Banks was named by President-elect Donald Trump to be the Chief of the United States Border Patrol. The position does not require Senate confirmation, and he was sworn in on January 22, 2025.

In April 2026, the Washington Examiner reported allegations according to former Border Patrol employees that Banks had engaged in sex tourism in Colombia and Thailand from the early to mid 2010s until his retirement in 2023.

Political offices
Preceded by Jason Owens	Chief of the United States Border Patrol; 2025–present	Incumbent
