= Operation Lone Star =

2021 to present Texas border operation

- Part of the Mexico–United States border crisis
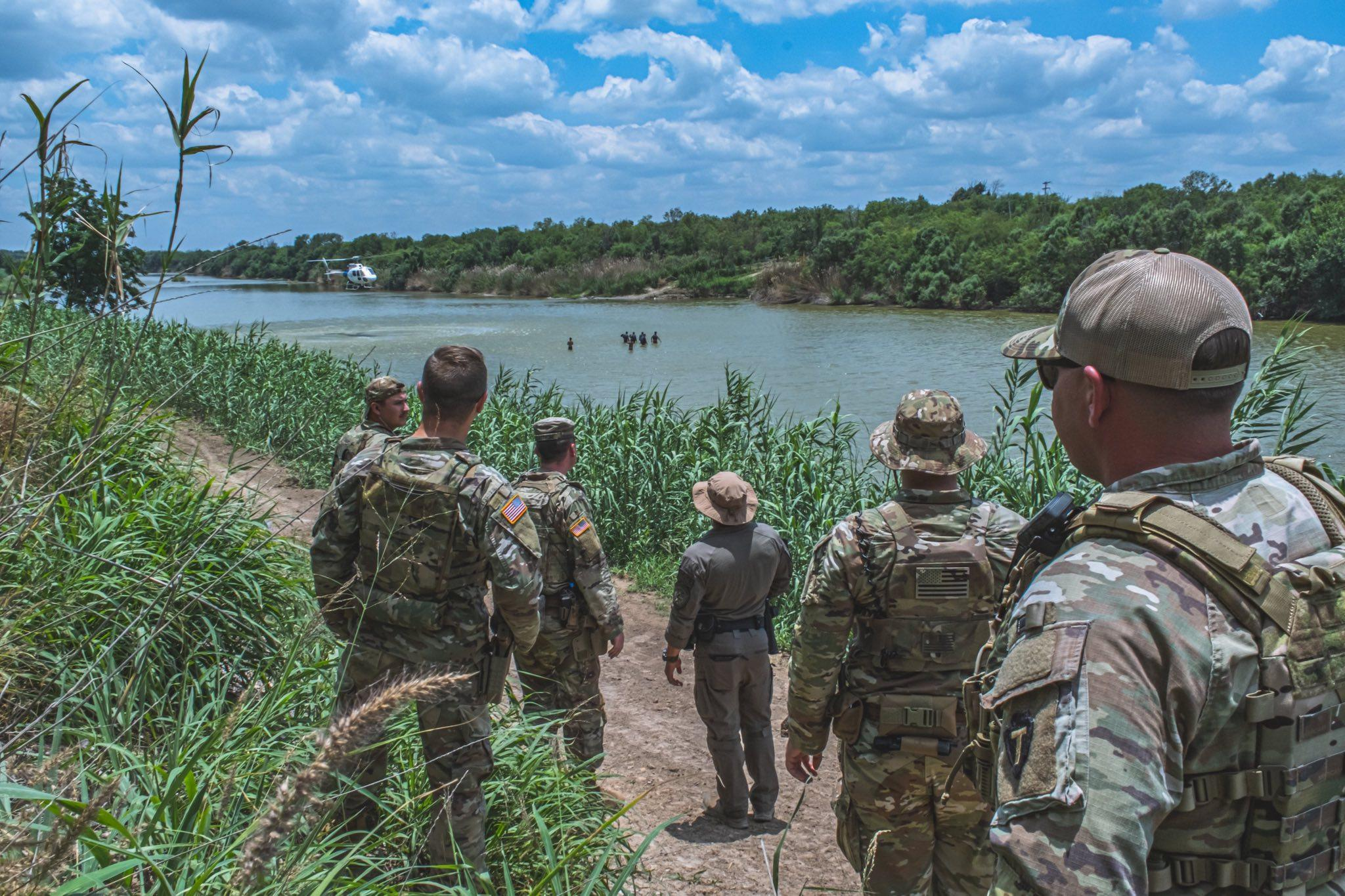
- Texas National Guard members during Operation Lone Star
Date	March 6, 2021–present (5 years, 7 months, 4 weeks and 2 days)
Location	Texas portion of the Mexico–United States border
Status	Ongoing; Arrests: 535,700 illegal immigrant apprehensions and referrals and more than 57,400 criminal arrests; Charges: More than 47,500 felony charges; More than 57,400 criminal arrests; 779 million doses of fentanyl seized; 119,200 migrants bused to sanctuary cities

Belligerents
Texas; Military Department; National Guard; State Guard; Department of Public Safety; Texas Rangers; Division of Emergency Management	Mexican drug cartels; Drug trafficking organizations; Human trafficking networks

Casualties and losses
State forces losses: 12–17 National Guard deaths (all non-combat, including suicides, medical emergencies, and traffic accidents)	Cartel, smuggler, & illicit losses: 624+ million lethal doses of fentanyl seized; 9,800+ weapons seized; $53+ million in currency seized; 43,400+ felony convictions & active charges (including mandatory 10-year minimum prison terms for human smuggling); Pursuit & casualties: 106 dead in OLS vehicle pursuits (including 20 bystanders); 301 injured in OLS vehicle pursuits; Hundreds of minor injuries reported from concertina/razor wire crossings

Operation Lone Star (OLS) is a joint operation between the Texas Department of Public Safety and the Texas Military Department along the Mexico–United States border in southern Texas. The operation started in 2021 and is ongoing. According to Texas governor Greg Abbott, the operation is intended to counter a rise in illegal immigration, the illegal drug trade, and human smuggling. Between fiscal year 2020 and fiscal year 2021, migrant apprehensions had risen 278% along the US–Mexico border. According to The Center Square, OLS has resulted in 538,141 migrant apprehensions, 63,659 criminal arrests (including 51,091 felony charges), and 489 million doses of fentanyl seized. As of April 2022, OLS was spending approximately $2.5 million per week and was expected to cost approximately $2 billion per year. Approximately 10,000 National Guard members were deployed in support of OLS at the height of the operation, with around 6,000 deployed as of November 2022. One year after the start of Operation Lone Star, Texas saw a 9% increase in migrant encounters along its border with Mexico, compared to a 62% increase in Arizona, California, and New Mexico along their respective borders with Mexico. As of July 2024, the Department of Public Safety has estimated a 85% drop in illegal border crossings since the start of OLS.

OLS has drawn support from many Republican Party state governors. OLS drew criticism from the federal government under then-president Biden, Democratic Party governors and mayors, and migrant advocates for its treatment of migrants, including the withholding of water and orders to push migrants back into the Rio Grande. Migrants have had a more difficult time crossing areas of the Rio Grande due to razor wire set up by OLS, leading to some migrants becoming injured and/or captured in the wire. Human Rights Watch (HRW) has criticized high speed pursuits in counties implementing OLS, which it attributed to causing 106 deaths and 301 injuries. Texas officials and national guard members have also voiced concerns about hardships sustained during deployment in support of OLS.

According to the governor, 119,200 migrants were voluntarily bused to sanctuary cities across the United States as of June 2024. A few migrants were also flown directly to these cities. This has resulted in migrant crises in cities like New York City, Chicago, and Washington, D.C., as local resources are stretched thin to handle the new arrivals. Local officials in the sanctuary cities have criticized the busing program and responded by requesting federal assistance, fining charter bus companies carrying migrants, and sending migrants to other cities.

In January 2024, Texas officials seized control of Shelby Park in Eagle Pass, which was frequently used by United States Border Patrol to process new migrant arrivals. Border patrol agents were generally prohibited from the park, except to access a boat ramp in the park after three migrants drowned nearby while crossing the Rio Grande. This led to a standoff between federal and state officials. The Biden administration has said that it would refer the dispute to the United States Department of Justice if access was not restored for border patrol agents.

== Smart Wall ==
On July 4th, 2025, President Donald Trump signed the One Big Beautiful Bill Act, and allocating $46.5 billion to continue construction on the Mexico-United States border wall. This includes a combination of a double wall, water barriers, and sensors to help with detection. They also included roads, lights and cameras to be constructed and installed.

- The federal government’s $4.5 billion "Smart Wall" project will add hundreds of miles of high-tech border security, including detection systems through Big Bend National Park.
- The Big Bend National Park could soon have new border security under the federal government's "Smart Wall" initiative.
- Texas is still waiting to receive more than $11 billion in federal reimbursement for Operation Lone Star expenses.

== Background and causes ==
Starting with "Operation Linebacker" by former governor Rick Perry, the State of Texas has been launching border security operations with increasing escalation since 2005. These operations were limited in scope due to the exclusive authority of federal immigration agents to deport migrants. Operation Lone Star was launched in 2021 to respond to the surge in border crossings, which Governor Abbott attributed to the Biden Administration's policies on immigration. In fiscal year 2021, enforcement actions by U.S. Customs and Border Protection, including detentions and arrests of migrants, rose to over 1.9 million, a 202% increase from fiscal year 2020. Meanwhile, a 278% increase in migrant encounters was seen at the southwest border from fiscal year 2020 to 2021, which continued rising into 2022.

Operation Lone Star differed from previous border operations due to the authority granted to state law enforcement officials to arrest migrants in border counties for offenses such as criminal trespassing and human smuggling. OLS efforts to empower local law enforcement to act against undocumented migrants have been complicated by the traditional delegation of immigration enforcement powers to federal officials. In Arizona v. United States, the Supreme Court overturned an Arizona law penalizing illegal immigration at a state level.

== Timeline ==
Developments in Operation Lone Star
Date	Notable Event
March 6, 2021	Operation Lone Star is launched
May 31, 2021	Greg Abbott declares disaster via Proclamation
June 16, 2021	Greg Abbott announces border wall construction strategy
December 18, 2021	First section of border wall completed in Rio Grande City
March 14, 2022	Major General Tracy Norris is relieved of command
April 6, 2022	Bus and flight of immigrants to sanctuary city Washington, D.C., begin
July 7, 2022	Greg Abbott declares invasion via Executive Order GA-41
September 21, 2022	Greg Abbott designates Mexican cartels as terrorist organizations via Executive Order GA-42
November 18, 2022	M113 armored personnel carriers are deployed
February 3, 2023	Greg Abbott establishes Texas Border Czar position, appoints Mike Banks
May 8, 2023	Greg Abbott establishes and deploys Texas Tactical Border Force
May 16, 2023	Texas requests assistance from other states, utilizing the Emergency Management Assistance Compact.
October 2, 2023	The Texas Ranger Division and Texas Army National Guard occupied Fronton Island.
December 18, 2023	Greg Abbott signs bill SB 4, making illegal immigration a state crime, allowing Texas law enforcement to arrest undocumented migrants anywhere in the state. It also permits state courts to issue removal orders to send arrested migrants back across the Mexican border.
January 11, 2024	Greg Abbott executes emergency declaration ordering Texas Military Forces to seize control of 47-acre Shelby Park in Eagle Pass from United States Border Patrol agents.
January 25, 2024	25 Republican state governors declare their support for Texas in its disputes with Federal authorities.
February 16, 2024	Greg Abbott announces FOB Eagle, an 80-acre forward operating base at Eagle Pass for 2,300 soldiers
April 19, 2024	Additional resources were sent to help secure border in El Paso due to a surge of illegal immigrants.
May 31, 2024	Texas National Guard soldiers were welcomed Governor Abbott during their move to the base camp in Eagle Pass.
September 23, 2024	Greg Abbott announces signed a Proclamation designating Tren de Aragua (TdA), a Venezuela gang as a foreign terrorist threat and announced a statewide effort to target the group, along with a reward for information leading to arrests.
February 21, 2026	Texas Facilities Commission announce Texas Border Infrastructure Program Concludes with last wall panel installed completing the 82.2-mile-long permanent barrier.

== Reactions ==
=== Public ===
As of June 2023, polling from the Texas Politics Project at the University of Texas at Austin indicated that 59% of Texans backed the increased law enforcement deployments and border spending.

The mission faced public criticism, including from state officials, following reports of pay delays, poor working and living conditions, a lack of proper equipment and facilities, and multiple suicides and suicide attempts among service members. According to reporting in the Army Times, soldiers were being housed in what it describes as cramped quarters, in converted recreational vehicles and semi-truck trailers, and also faced shortages in cold weather uniforms, medical equipment, and portable toilets. According to the Houston Chronicle, this was further compounded when it coincided with state cuts in educational benefits for service members to address budget shortfalls, reducing available tuition assistance by more than half. Some Texas Air National Guard members deployed in support of OLS have also criticized the operation's planning and execution, with nearly 30% of 250 participants in a 2022 Air National Guard survey reporting frustration with the operation's length, haste, and involuntary nature.

On January 13, 2022, a state district court judge in Travis County, Texas, granted Jesús Alberto Guzmán Curipoma, of Ecuador, a writ of habeas corpus, ruling that the state program violated the Supremacy Clause of the United States Constitution. On February 25, 2022, the state Third Court of Appeals in Austin affirmed the decision of the lower court. On June 26, 2024, the Court of Criminal Appeals vacated the Third Court of Appeals decision and remanded the case for reconsideration.

Republican Party officials in multiple states and in federal positions supported Texas' efforts and criticized opposition from the Biden administration.

More than 100 sheriffs in Texas have publicly backed OLS.

Many people support OLS, as of February 10, 2025 there has been an estimated amount of 56 million dollars donated to fund, the border wall, border transportation, and border security. This funding is from donations from Americans all over not only in Texas.

=== Department of Justice investigation and lawsuits ===
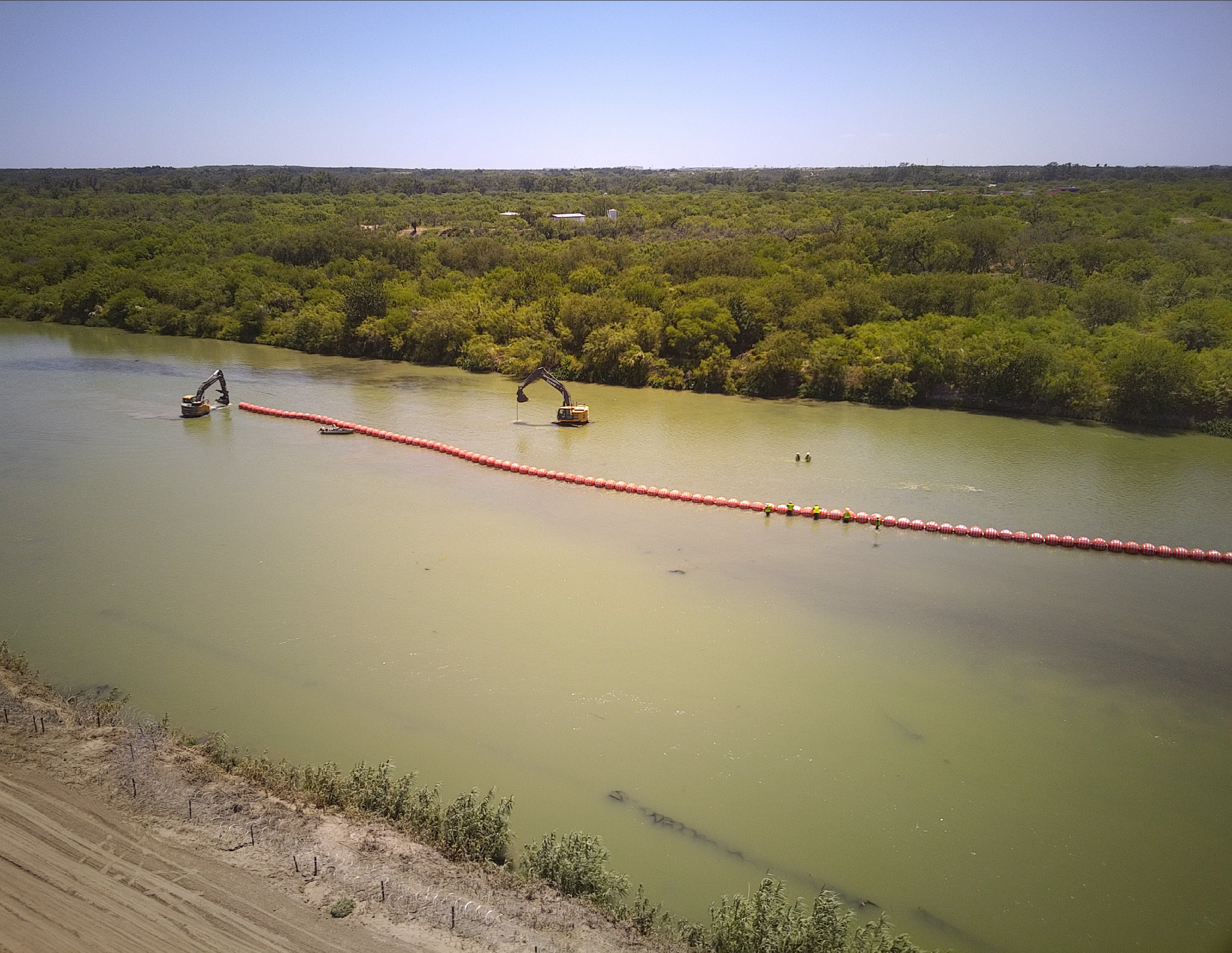
Construction of the Rio Grande barriers by OLS

==== Civil rights investigation ====
In July 2022, the Department of Justice opened a civil rights investigation of OLS. According to a Texas Department of Public Safety email obtained by the Texas Tribune, the investigation is focused on reviewing whether OLS violates Title VI of the Civil Rights Act of 1964, which prohibits discrimination on the basis of race, color, or national origin by programs that receive federal funds.

==== Federal lawsuits ====
On July 24, 2023, the DOJ filed a lawsuit in the Western District of Texas, United States v. Abbott, alleging that the construction of floating barriers in the Rio Grande near Eagle Pass by OLS without permission violated the Rivers and Harbors Act of 1899. In a statement announcing the lawsuit, Associate Attorney General Vanita Gupta said that the barriers pose a hazard to navigation and public safety, present humanitarian concerns, and have sparked diplomatic protests by Mexico. In response, Texas argued that the area of the Rio Grande near Eagle Pass does not fall under the Act and that the floating barriers are not a "structure" subject to the Act's requirements. Texas also argued that the Compact Clause of the U.S. Constitution, which allows states to engage in war if invaded, allows Texas to build the barriers due to Governor Abbott's invasion declaration. On September 6, the district court granted the DOJ's motion for a preliminary injunction and ordered Texas to move the barrier to the bank of the river and cease the installation of any new barriers. In response, Texas appealed the order to the Court of Appeals for the Fifth Circuit, which issued an order on December 1 affirming the injunction. The court also found that Texas has not offered concrete evidence that the barrier has saved lives or reduced illegal migration. The outcome of the case is pending an en banc rehearing in the Fifth Circuit.

Department of Homeland Security v. Texas
- Court: Western District of Texas
- Started: October 24, 2023
- Docket nos.: 2:23-cv-00055 (W.D. Tex.); 23-50869 (5th Cir.); 23A607 (SCOTUS)

Case history
- Appealed to: Fifth Circuit
- Subsequent action: 5th circuit ruling stayed by supreme court via shadow docket

Court membership
- Judge sitting: Alia Moses

Federal border patrol agents have cut and destroyed razor wire deployed by Texas as part of Operation Lone Star, but were halted from doing so except to provide emergency medical aid by a temporary injunction issued by a judge in the Western District of Texas on October 30, 2023. On November 30, the court withdrew the injunction, allowing the Border Patrol to resume cutting the wire pending a trial in the case. The Fifth Circuit reinstated the temporary injunction on cutting razor wire in December 2023. In January 2024, the Supreme Court restored the ability of border patrol agents to cut razor wire pending the outcome of the case. Texas continued putting up concertina wire and blocking border patrol agents after the ruling, which only dealt with the temporary injunction against border patrol agents cutting razor wire. The case is ongoing and is scheduled to be argued before the Fifth Circuit on February 7, 2024.

Since 2022, Abbott has repeatedly invoked the "invasion clauses" of the Constitution to legally justify his efforts on immigration enforcement, which typically falls under federal purview. Abbott has accused the Biden administration of failing to protect Texas against an "invasion" under Article IV, Section 4 of the Constitution, thus empowering the state to act under Article I, Section 10, Clause 3. Texas has also unsuccessfully attempted to use this argument in federal court.

On January 3, 2024, the Biden administration filed United States v. Texas, a lawsuit challenging SB 4, which empowered Texas law enforcement to arrest migrants and effectively deport them for crossing the border illegally. The Biden administration argued that Texas was interfering with the federal government's "exclusive authority" on immigration. The United States Supreme Court issued a stay temporarily blocking SB 4 from going into effect on March 4, 2024. The Supreme Court rejected a later request for a stay and allowed the law to go into effect pending ongoing litigation on March 19.

==== Eagle Pass park standoff ====
On January 11, 2024, the Texas National Guard took control of Shelby Park, a 47-acre (19 ha) area of parkland in the town of Eagle Pass, along the Rio Grande river, which separates the United States from Mexico, after Texas Governor Greg Abbott signed an emergency declaration to close the park. In his declaration, Abbott cited the Mexico–United States border crisis and the need to secure the border. The Texas National Guard blocked U.S. Border Patrol agents from patrolling the area, which the Border Patrol had been using to hold migrants in recent weeks.

After the closure, three migrants were found drowned in the Rio Grande. Mexican authorities subsequently identified them as a 33-year-old woman and her two children, aged 10 and 8. The U.S. Border Patrol said it had alerted the Texas National Guard that a group of migrants were in distress in the waters outside the boat ramp in Shelby Park but that the National Guard took no action to rescue them. Texas lawyers responded that the National Guard was alerted only after the three had drowned, and that the National Guard had not spotted any migrants. Mexican authorities said that the boat never entered U.S. territory.

On January 22, the Supreme Court of the United States issued an order to vacate an injunction by the 5th U.S. Circuit Court of Appeals that prevented Border Patrol agents from cutting concertina wire, which the National Guard had been using to make a fence in Shelby Park. The ruling concerned an earlier dispute and did not address Texas deploying razor wire or blocking federal officials from the park. On January 24, Abbott responded that Texas would refuse to let federal authorities access the park, vowing to "protect the sovereignty of our state". A military standoff between state and federal authorities over immigration is unique in modern American history; constitutional law professor Charles "Rocky" Rhodes and an editorial in the San Antonio Express-News said it may signal the start of a constitutional crisis.

In the aftermath of the Supreme Court's decision, 25 other Republican state governors (every Republican governor but Vermont's Phil Scott) announced their support for Texas in the dispute, as did U.S. House speaker Mike Johnson. Florida Governor Ron DeSantis additionally committed to sending more resources after previously sending the Florida National Guard to reinforce the Texas government. Oklahoma Governor Kevin Stitt pledged to deploy the Oklahoma National Guard to support Texas, and Indiana Governor Eric Holcomb announced that 50 Indiana National Guardsmen would arrive in Texas by mid-March. Georgia Governor Brian Kemp stated 15 to 20 Georgia National Guard troops would be sent to Texas. In Missouri, Governor Mike Parson issued an executive order to deploy up to 200 Missouri National Guard troops to Texas, as well as 22 state troopers "on a voluntary basis". Arkansas Governor Sarah Huckabee Sanders stated that approximately 40 Arkansas National Guard members would be deployed in Texas from April 1 through May 30. Other state and national Republican officials backed Texas.

On January 23, the Department of Homeland Security issued Texas attorney general Ken Paxton an ultimatum, ordering the removal of "obstructions" along the border and that the Border Patrol be given full access to Shelby Park by January 26. On January 24, Democratic Texas representatives Joaquin Castro and Greg Casar called for U.S. President Joe Biden to establish federal control over the Texas National Guard. On January 26, the deadline set by Department of Homeland Security passed. It had ordered Texas to agree to fully reopen disputed parts of the Shelby Park area to federal Border Patrol agents, emphasizing the need for confirmation and specifying the consequences of partial denial in a letter from DHS General Counsel Jonathan Meyer to Attorney General Paxton.

On January 29, more than two dozen Republican state attorneys general, and leadership from the Republican-controlled Arizona State Legislature, signed a letter supporting Abbott and Paxton, addressing President Biden and DHS Secretary Alejandro Mayorkas and commending Abbott's and Paxton's actions against what they called the "invasion, encouraged by Biden's refusal to follow federal statutory law".

=== Other states ===
On May 16, 2023, Abbott requested assistance from other state governors through the Emergency Management Assistance Compact. As of June 2023, 14 states have sent about 500 national guard and law enforcement officers to Texas in response, with Florida providing the most additional personnel.

== Results ==
Texas Governor Abbott claims OLS has resulted in 513,700 migrant apprehensions, 44,000 criminal arrests (including 38,600 felony charges), and 489 million doses of fentanyl seized as of June 2024. However, a March 2022 investigation by ProPublica, The Texas Tribune, and The Marshall Project found that the Texas Department of Public Safety had counted over 2,000 arrests with no link to OLS or border security towards OLS's total. After those arrests were removed, later reports found DPS still continues to include arrests unrelated to Operation Lone Star in the operation's results.

High speed chases of migrants led by US citizens and Texas state police have risen in Texas, dozens of which are fatal. Human Rights Watch found that more than two-thirds of police chases in Texas occurred in OLS counties, which contained 13% of the state population. According to HRW, 74 people have died and 189 were injured as a result of these chases, resulting in a vehicle pursuit death rate eight times as high as the national rate. It also found an average of $177,000 in property damage per month linked to these chases, up from $73,000 per month prior to OLS.

The costs of the operation have resulted in funding being transferred from other Texas government agency budgets, particularly the Texas Department of Criminal Justice, which operates state prisons. Reimbursement for the costs have partly been filled by using federal COVID aid.

After the start of OLS, Texas saw slower rates of increases in migrant encounters than neighboring states since the start of OLS. One year after inception, Texas saw a 9% increase in encounters, compared to a 62% increase in encounters in Arizona, California, and New Mexico, the three other states bordering Mexico. In June 2024, the Department of Public Safety reported that Texas experienced a 74% decrease in illegal border crossings since the start of OLS.

== Bussing to sanctuary cities ==
As part of Operation Lone Star, Texas set up a program to voluntarily send migrants to sanctuary cities in other states, typically through busing. Abbott has stated that the purpose of the migrant busing program was to provide Texan border towns with relief from migrant arrivals, which he blames on the Biden administration's policies on immigration, and to bring the costs of the border crisis to Democratic cities that had been dismissing it. Abbott has also mocked leaders of cities he sent migrants to for saying that they welcome immigrants. Some migrant advocates reported instances of buses being sent without adequate provisions. The state reported sending 119,200 migrants to cities outside of Texas, contributing to the New York City migrant housing crisis and other crises in cities such as Chicago, Denver, and Washington, D.C. Officials in these cities have responded to the drop-off of migrants by deploying emergency measures and calling states of emergencies. Some Democratic-led cities, such as Denver and New York City, have also responded by giving migrants free bus and plane rides to other cities.

To carry out the busing program, charter bus companies transport the migrants at a cost of about $1,650 per migrant, with funding coming from both the Texas legislature and private donors. A few hundred migrants have also been flown from Texas to sanctuary cities. Local officials in the sanctuary cities have attempted to crack down on the busing programs via fines and ordinances targeting the charter bus companies. New York City in particular has filed a lawsuit against 17 charter bus companies responsible for migrant transportation. Officials in areas dealing with migrant surges have called on the Biden administration to change immigration policies. They have also requested federal aid to fund their responses to the migrant influx and reimburse costs. Washington, D.C., in particular has requested the deployment of the D.C. National Guard to assist in the migrant crisis, but has been turned down.

Republican officials have expressed approval of the OLS busing program for giving the migrant crisis national attention. In 2022, White House Press Secretary Jen Psaki said it was "nice the State of Texas is helping [migrants] get to their final destination", while in 2023, the White House and other Democrats called the busing program a "political stunt". Other states and cities, both Democratic and Republican, as well as local charities, have followed Texas in organizing busing operations to move migrants to the rest of the country.

== See also ==
- Immigration policy of the Joe Biden administration
- Immigration policy of Donald Trump
- New York City migrant housing crisis
- Operation Jump Start
- Operation Faithful Patriot
- List of conflicts involving the Texas Military
- Texas secession movements
