= Oscar Rodriguez (American football) =

American football coach

Current position
- Title: Head coach
- Team: Southwestern (CA)
- Conference: NSL
- Record: 10–11

Playing career
- 2001: Emporia State
- 2002: Coffeyville
- 2003–2004: Fort Hays State

Coaching career (HC unless noted)
- 2005: Randall HS (TX) (DB)
- 2006–2007: Washburn (DB)
- 2008–2009: Baker (co-DC/DB)
- 2010: Hutchinson (AHC/co-DC)
- 2011–2012: Emporia State (AHC/DC)
- 2013–2014: Garden City (AHC/DC/ST)
- 2015–2017: La Verne (AHC/DC)
- 2018: Chattanooga (AHC/ILB)
- 2019: Akron (S)
- 2020: Akron (ILB)
- 2021: Akron (AHC/ILB)
- 2021: Akron (interim HC)
- 2022–2023: Kansas (def. analyst)
- 2024–present: Southwestern (CA)

Head coaching record
- Overall: 0–3 (college); 10–11 (junior college)
- Bowls: 1–0 (junior college)

Oscar Rodriguez Jr. is an American football coach and former player. He is the head football coach at Southwestern College in Chula Vista, California. Rodriguez served as the interim head football coach at the University of Akron for the final three games of the 2021 season. He replaced Tom Arth, who was fired on November 4.

== Playing career ==
Rodriguez attended Liberal High School in Liberal, Kansas. He began his college career in 2001 at Emporia State University in Emporia, Kansas. He transferred to Coffeyville Community College in Coffeyville, Kansas, for the 2002 season, before finishing out his career at Fort Hays State University in Hays, Kansas.

== Personal life ==
Rodriguez grew up in Liberal, Kansas, after his parents immigrated from Mexico in the 1970s. He earned a bachelor's degree in physical education/health from Fort Hays State University in 2005 and a master's degree from Washburn University in educational administration in 2008.

Rodriguez is a two-time cancer survivor and founded the Coaches Against Cancer Foundation, which raises money for "lodging, travel, medical bills, [and] medication" for people with cancer.

== Head coaching record ==
=== College ===
Year	Team	Overall	Conference	Standing	Bowl/playoffs
Akron Zips (Mid-American Conference) (2021)
2021	Akron	0–3 (Note: Rodriguez took over as interim coach after nine games)	0–3	6th (East)	
Akron:		0–3	0–3		
Total:		0–3			

=== Junior college ===
Year	Team	Overall	Conference	Standing	Bowl/playoffs
Southwestern Jaguars (National Southern League) (2024–present)
2024	Southwestern	2–8	1–6	7th	
2025	Southwestern	8–3	4–3	4th	W Patriotic Bowl
Southwestern:		10–11	5–8		
Total:		10–11			
