= Southwestern Jaguars football =

College football team

- First season: 1961; 65 years ago
- Athletic director: Ron Valenzuela
- Head coach: Oscar Rodriguez; 2nd season, 8–3 (.727)
- Location: Chula Vista, California
- Stadium: DeVore Stadium (capacity: 7,200)
- Conference: National Southern League
- Colors: Burgundy and gold
- Bowl record: 9–5–1 (.633)

Conference championships
- 6

Division championships
- 1
- Rivalries: Grossmont, San Diego City
- Mascot: Jaguars
- Website: southwesternjaguars.com

The Southwestern Jaguars football team represents Southwestern College in junior college football in the Southern California Football Association (SCFA). The Jaguars are members of the National Southern League (NSL), fielding its team in the NSL since 2018. The Jaguars play their home games at DeVore Stadium in Chula Vista, California. Southwestern was known as the Apaches through the 2000 season. In May 2001, the governing board of Southwestern College voted to change the fight name of the school's sports teams from Apaches to Jaguars. Oscar Rodriguez has served as head coach of the program since the 2024 season.

In 2011, the Southwestern team included Dave Wade, a 55-year-old carpenter who was on the roster the whole season and got in one play on a kickoff.

== Conference affiliations ==
- South Central Conference (1961)
- Eastern Conference (1962–1963)
- Pacific Southwest Conference (1964–1967)
- Southeastern Conference / Mission Conference (1968–1995)
- Foothill Conference (1996–2007) (Note: In 1996, Southwestern played against every team in the Foothill Conference, but those games were counted as non-conference games and had no effect on the league standings since they were not yet full members.)
- American Mountain Conference / League (2008–2009), (2012–2017)
- Central East Conference (2010–2011)
- National Southern League (2018–present)

== Head coaches ==
- Tom Parker (1961–1965)
- Claude Gilbert (1966)
- Art Filson (1967–1968)
- Wes Foreman (1969–1975)
- Bob Mears (1976–1989)
- Bill Kinney (1990–1994)
- Mike Pompa (1995–2000)
- Walt Justice (2001–2004) (Note: Justice was the interim head coach during the 2001 season before assuming the full-time position in 2002.)
- Mike Pompa (2005)
- Jan Chapman (2006)
- Ed Carberry (2007–2021)
- Dionicio Monarrez Jr. (2022–2023)
- Oscar Rodriguez (2024–present)

== Championships ==
=== Conference championships ===
Season	Conference	Coach	Overall record	Conference record
1966†	Pacific Southwest Conference	Claude Gilbert	5–3	5–1
1982†	Mission Conference	Bob Mears	10–1	5–1
2008†	American Mountain Conference	Ed Carberry	7–4	6–1
2012	American Mountain Conference	Ed Carberry	10–1	7–0
2016†	American Mountain League	Ed Carberry	9–2	4–1
2017	American Mountain League	Ed Carberry	9–2	5–0

† Co-champions

=== Division championships ===
Following the 1987 season, the Mission Conference split into North, Central, and South divisions, with Southwestern competing in the South division. Southwestern has won one divisional title.

Season	Division	Coach	Overall record	Division record
1988	Mission Conference South Division	Bob Mears	7–4	4–0

== Bowl games ==
Southwestern is 9–5–1 all time in post-season bowl games. They first won a bowl game in 1982, which was their bowl game debut.

Date	Coach	Bowl	Opponent	Result	Ref.
December 4, 1982	Bob Mears	1982 San Diego-South Bay Bowl	Glendale (CA)	W 26–7	
December 3, 1983	Bob Mears	1983 South Bay-Kiwanis Bowl (Note: Also known as the 1983 California Community College Bowl)	El Camino	W 24–11	
December 6, 1985	Bob Mears	1985 National Football Foundation Bowl (Note: Also known as the 1985 San Diego Community College Bowl)	Grossmont	T 35–35	
December 6, 1986	Bob Mears	1986 National Football Foundation Bowl	San Diego Mesa	W 23–0	
December 3, 1988	Bob Mears	1988 National Football Foundation Bowl (Note: Also known as the 1988 Hall of Fame Bowl)	Antelope Valley	W 20–16	
December 4, 1999	Mike Pompa	1999 South County Bowl	El Camino	L 7–49	
December 2, 2000	Mike Pompa	2000 South County Bowl	Mt. San Antonio	L 17–21	
November 22, 2008	Ed Carberry	2008 Tremblay Financial Services Bowl	Pasadena City	L 14–45	
November 17, 2012	Ed Carberry	2012 American Bowl	Santa Monica	W 45–31	
November 23, 2013	Ed Carberry	2013 Patriotic Bowl	San Bernardino Valley	W 34–23	
November 22, 2014	Ed Carberry	2014 American Bowl	Santa Monica	W 40–23	
November 19, 2016	Ed Carberry	2016 American Bowl	Los Angeles Valley	L 16–24	
November 18, 2017	Ed Carberry	2017 American Bowl	Allan Hancock	W 35–14	
November 17, 2018	Ed Carberry	2018 Beach Bowl	Palomar	W 28–24	
November 23, 2019	Ed Carberry	2019 Southern California Bowl	Long Beach City	L 16–20	

== Stadiums ==
=== DeVore Stadium (1971–present) ===
DeVore Stadium is the home football stadium for the Southwestern College Jaguars football team. Located on the college's campus in Chula Vista, California, and with a seating capacity of 7,200, the stadium opened in 1971 under the original name of Apache Stadium at a cost of $444,000. The first public event held at the stadium was a Fourth of July fireworks show sponsored by the local firefighters association. On September 18, 1971, Southwestern defeated local rivals San Diego City 21–6 in the first game played at the new stadium with over 4,000 spectators in attendance. The stadium was jointly financed by Southwestern College and the Sweetwater Union High School District, with the latter paying for the stadium lights in return for lifetime use of the facility as the home stadium for the Bonita Vista High School football team.

In 2014, a two-year stadium renovation project was completed, which included the replacement of the grass field with artificial turf and the construction of a 58,000-square-foot, four-story field house behind the south end zone with state-of-the-art training facilities, weight rooms, locker rooms, classrooms, offices, and a student fitness center. In addition, a two-story press box was built on the west side along with new bathroom and concession facilities on each side. During this period, Southwestern temporarily played its home games at Olympian High School. Tod Leonard of The San Diego Union-Tribune said that the stadium was "transformed... into one of the best community college home fields in the country" while Phillip Brents of The Star-News commented that "the finished product rivals the athletic complexes of most four-year universities". The renovation project won several awards, including Project of the Year from the Construction Management Association of America San Diego chapter, as well as LEED Gold certification.

==== Other ====
On April 24, 1994, DeVore Stadium hosted an international soccer friendly between the United States and Iceland.

The So Cal Scorpions of the Women's Professional Football League (WPFL) hosted their first-ever playoff game at DeVore Stadium on October 29, 2005.

On September 19, 2009, DeVore Stadium hosted the San Diego Football Classic between Central State and Stillman. The matchup between the two HBCUs was organized by Central State athletic director and San Diego Chargers legend Kellen Winslow.

=== Chula Vista High School (1961–1970) ===
Before the opening of DeVore Stadium, Southwestern played its home games at Chula Vista High School from 1961 to 1970.

== Notable players ==
- Jonah Rodriguez
- Josiah Jefferson
- Scott Byers
- John Fox
- Tommy Hinzo
- Marco Morales
- Ogemdi Nwagbuo
- Luis Perez
- Steve Pierce
- Oliver Ross
