= Intersegmental General Education Transfer Curriculum =

The Intersegmental General Education Transfer Curriculum (IGETC) is an educational plan for California community college students designed to facilitate transferring to a four-year public university, including all UC and CSU schools. A number of non-public and/or non-Californian universities also accept IGETC. These include, but are not limited to: Arizona State University, University of La Verne, University of the Pacific, and others. The IGETC is created by the Intersegmental Committee of the Academic Senates (ICAS).

The IGETC is not an admission requirement into a university. The IGETC is a recommended certification that students receive from community college. Students that complete the IGETC are waived from general breadth courses after they transfer into a UC/CSU school. enabling them to focus only on their major once accepted into a UC or CSU. By waiving these classes, students can save money by fulfilling general education requirements in a cheaper institution.

The curriculum requires completion of a varying amount of courses with a C (or a 2.0 out of a 4.0 scale) grade or better in each class. Students can choose to take classes across any California Community College campuses. They must fulfill a certain number of units from each of these areas: English Communication, Mathematical Concepts and Quantitative Reasoning, Arts and Humanities, Social and Behavior Sciences, Physical and Biological Sciences, and Foreign Language. AP and IB credit may be used to fulfill course requirements. There are slight differences between the requirements for UC schools and CSU schools; for example, the CSU system requires an oral communication course while UC schools require proficiency in a language other than English.

Different community colleges use different titles for courses. For example, English Composition could be referred to as “English 101” at one campus and “English 1A” at another. Unfortunately, there is no universal list class list with course codes. Students are required to match the class description between the schools' catalogs. To mitigate this, the California Community College system, in conjunction with the University of California and California State University systems, provides the ASSIST database as the official statewide database of course articulation between educational institutions.

== History ==
The Intersegmental General Education Transfer Curriculum (IGETC) began in 1991. During the 1980s, a commission was tasked with reviewing the Master Plan for Higher Education and legislators' and students' concerns regarding transfers between 2-year community colleges and 4-year institutions. Faculty from community colleges and member institutions of the University of California system and California State University system convened to develop a "statewide, lower-division general education transfer curriculum applicable to all California Community College (CCC) students transferring to a California State University (CSU) or University of California (UC) campus".

In 2021, the California State legislature initiated efforts to establish a new unified General Education pathway to replace both IGETC and the similar California State University pathway known as CSUGE (CSU General Education). Efforts are underway to replace IGETC with a new general education curriculum called Cal-GETC. The plan has faced criticism, such as the California Faculty Association, for removing and reducing certain general education requirements and requiring a minimum grade of C for all courses in the pattern. Others support the change, with the Vice President of Instruction at Los Medanos College saying, "The California community colleges, the UCs, and the CSUs worked together to create one pathway. It’s just supposed to streamline things and make it easier for students." The plan is slated to go into effect in Fall of 2025.
