= Foothill Conference =

Junior college athletic conference in Southern California

The Foothill Conference was a college athletic conference that is affiliated with the California Community College Athletic Association. Several community colleges were members until it was formally disbanded in Spring, 2016.

== History ==
The Foothill Conference was formed in 1988. However, the roots of the conference can be traced to 1981 when the football-only Foothill Conference was formed.

The Foothill Conference was an offshoot of the Southern California Athletic Conference (SCAC), which included many of the Los Angeles-based community colleges. Founding members of the Foothill Conference were Antelope Valley, Citrus, Chaffey, Desert, East Los Angeles, Mt. San Jacinto, Rio Hondo, San Bernardino Valley and Victor Valley colleges.

Two colleges, East Los Angeles College and Citrus College, eventually left the conference. Barstow College and Cerro Coso Community College joined later as full-time participants.

In Fall 2013, Mt. San Jacinto and Antelope Valley were hosted into other athletic conferences. Mt. San Jacinto was accepted as a member of the Pacific Coast Conference while Antelope Valley moved to the Western State Conference South Division.

The departure of Mt. San Jacinto and Antelope Valley made the conference the smallest in the state, eventually leading to is demise.

== Members ==
- Barstow College Vikings
- Cerro Coso College Coyotes
- Chaffey College Panthers
- College of the Desert Roadrunners
- Rio Hondo College Roadrunners
- San Bernardino Valley College Wolverines
- Victor Valley College Rams

=== Past members ===
School	Nickname	Current conference
Antelope Valley College	Marauders	Western State Conference
Citrus College	Owls	Western State Conference
East Los Angeles College	Huskies	South Coast Conference
Mt. San Jacinto College	Eagles	Pacific Coast Athletic Conference

== Yearly football standings ==
1981 Foothill Conference football standings
	Conf.					Overall
Team	W		L		T	W		L		T
Antelope Valley +	4	–	1	–	0	7	–	4	–	0
MiraCosta +	4	–	1	–	0	4	–	6	–	0
San Bernardino Valley	3	–	2	–	0	8	–	2	–	0
Mt. San Jacinto	2	–	3	–	0	6	–	4	–	0
Imperial Valley	2	–	3	–	0	3	–	6	–	0
Desert	0	–	5	–	0	2	–	8	–	0
+ – Conference co-champions

1982 Foothill Conference football standings
	Conf.					Overall
Team	W		L		T	W		L		T
San Bernardino Valley $	5	–	0	–	0	11	–	0	–	0
Antelope Valley	4	–	1	–	0	6	–	4	–	0
Imperial Valley	2	–	3	–	0	3	–	7	–	0
MiraCosta	2	–	3	–	0	3	–	7	–	0
Mt. San Jacinto	2	–	3	–	0	3	–	7	–	0
Desert	0	–	5	–	0	0	–	10	–	0
$ – Conference champion

1983 Foothill Conference football standings
	Conf.					Overall
Team	W		L		T	W		L		T
Antelope Valley $	5	–	0	–	0	8	–	3	–	0
Desert	3	–	1	–	1	6	–	3	–	1
Mt. San Jacinto	3	–	2	–	0	4	–	5	–	0
San Bernardino Valley	2	–	3	–	0	5	–	5	–	0
Grossmont	1	–	3	–	1	3	–	6	–	1
Imperial Valley	0	–	5	–	0	0	–	9	–	0
$ – Conference champion

1984 Foothill Conference football standings
	Conf.					Overall
Team	W		L		T	W		L		T
Grossmont +	4	–	1	–	0	8	–	3	–	0
Antelope Valley +	4	–	1	–	0	5	–	4	–	1
San Bernardino Valley	3	–	2	–	0	7	–	3	–	0
Desert	3	–	2	–	0	6	–	4	–	0
Mt. San Jacinto	1	–	4	–	0	2	–	9	–	0
Imperial Valley	0	–	5	–	0	3	–	7	–	0
+ – Conference co-champions

1985 Foothill Conference football standings
	Conf.					Overall
Team	W		L		T	W		L		T
Grossmont $	5	–	0	–	0	9	–	1	–	1
Mt. San Jacinto	3	–	2	–	0	6	–	3	–	0
Desert	2	–	3	–	0	7	–	3	–	0
San Bernardino Valley	2	–	3	–	0	6	–	4	–	0
Antelope Valley	2	–	3	–	0	5	–	5	–	0
Imperial Valley	1	–	4	–	0	4	–	6	–	0
$ – Conference champion

1988 Foothill Conference football standings
	Conf.					Overall
Team	W		L		T	W		L		T
San Bernardino Valley $	7	–	1	–	0	8	–	3	–	0
Antelope Valley	6	–	1	–	1	8	–	2	–	1
East Los Angeles	5	–	3	–	0	6	–	4	–	0
Citrus	5	–	3	–	0	6	–	5	–	0
Mt. San Jacinto	4	–	4	–	0	5	–	5	–	0
Desert	3	–	4	–	1	3	–	6	–	1
Chaffey	3	–	5	–	0	5	–	5	–	0
Rio Hondo	2	–	6	–	0	2	–	8	–	0
Victor Valley	0	–	8	–	0	2	–	7	–	0
$ – Conference champion

1990 Foothill Conference football standings
	Conf.					Overall
Team	W		L		T	W		L		T
Citrus $	8	–	0	–	0	8	–	3	–	0
Antelope Valley	6	–	2	–	0	8	–	3	–	0
Desert	6	–	2	–	0	6	–	4	–	0
Mt. San Jacinto	5	–	3	–	0	7	–	3	–	0
San Bernardino Valley	4	–	4	–	0	5	–	5	–	0
Chaffey *	4	–	4	–	0	4	–	6	–	0
East Los Angeles	2	–	6	–	0	3	–	7	–	0
Victor Valley	1	–	7	–	0	1	–	9	–	0
Rio Hondo	0	–	8	–	0	0	–	10	–	0
$ – Conference champion; * – Chaffey forfeited conference games to Antelope Valley and Desert.

1991 Foothill Conference football standings
	Conf.					Overall
Team	W		L		T	W		L		T
San Bernardino Valley $	7	–	1	–	0	8	–	3	–	0
Antelope Valley	6	–	2	–	0	8	–	3	–	0
Mt. San Jacinto	6	–	3	–	0	7	–	4	–	0
Chaffey	5	–	3	–	0	6	–	4	–	0
Citrus	5	–	3	–	0	6	–	4	–	0
Desert	4	–	4	–	0	4	–	5	–	1
East Los Angeles	2	–	6	–	0	3	–	7	–	0
Rio Hondo	2	–	6	–	0	2	–	8	–	0
Victor Valley	0	–	9	–	0	0	–	10	–	0
$ – Conference champion

1992 Foothill Conference football standings
	Conf.					Overall
Team	W		L		T	W		L		T
San Bernardino Valley $	8	–	0	–	0	10	–	0	–	1
Antelope Valley	6	–	2	–	0	8	–	2	–	1
Desert	6	–	2	–	0	6	–	4	–	1
Citrus	5	–	2	–	1	5	–	3	–	2
Victor Valley	3	–	5	–	0	5	–	5	–	0
Mt. San Jacinto	3	–	5	–	0	3	–	7	–	0
Rio Hondo	2	–	5	–	1	2	–	5	–	1
Chaffey	2	–	6	–	0	3	–	7	–	0
East Los Angeles	0	–	8	–	0	0	–	10	–	0
$ – Conference champion

1993 Foothill Conference football standings
	Conf.					Overall
Team	W		L		T	W		L		T
San Bernardino Valley $	7	–	0	–	0	10	–	1	–	0
Citrus	6	–	1	–	0	8	–	3	–	0
Antelope Valley	5	–	2	–	0	6	–	5	–	0
Desert	4	–	3	–	0	6	–	4	–	0
Chaffey	2	–	5	–	0	3	–	7	–	0
Mt. San Jacinto	2	–	5	–	0	2	–	8	–	0
Rio Hondo	1	–	6	–	0	3	–	7	–	0
Victor Valley	1	–	6	–	0	3	–	7	–	0
$ – Conference champion

1994 Foothill Conference football standings
	Conf.					Overall
Team	W		L		T	W		L		T
Desert $	7	–	1	–	0	9	–	2	–	0
San Bernardino Valley	6	–	1	–	1	6	–	3	–	1
Grossmont	6	–	2	–	0	8	–	3	–	0
Chaffey	5	–	3	–	0	7	–	3	–	0
Mt. San Jacinto	4	–	3	–	1	6	–	3	–	1
Antelope Valley	3	–	5	–	0	3	–	7	–	0
Citrus	2	–	5	–	1	2	–	7	–	1
Victor Valley	1	–	6	–	1	2	–	7	–	1
Rio Hondo	0	–	8	–	0	1	–	9	–	0
$ – Conference champion

1995 Foothill Conference football standings
	Conf.					Overall
Team	W		L		T	W		L		T
San Bernardino Valley +	7	–	1	–	0	10	–	1	–	0
Citrus +	7	–	1	–	0	9	–	2	–	0
Desert	6	–	2	–	0	7	–	3	–	0
Chaffey	6	–	2	–	0	7	–	4	–	0
Grossmont	3	–	5	–	0	4	–	5	–	1
Antelope Valley	3	–	5	–	0	4	–	6	–	0
Rio Hondo	2	–	5	–	0	4	–	5	–	0
Mt. San Jacinto	1	–	6	–	0	1	–	8	–	0
Victor Valley	0	–	8	–	0	1	–	9	–	0
+ – Conference co-champions

1996 Foothill Conference football standings
	Conf.					Overall
Team	W		L		T	W		L		T
San Bernardino Valley +	7	–	1	–	0	10	–	1	–	0
Chaffey +	7	–	1	–	0	9	–	2	–	0
Grossmont +	7	–	1	–	0	9	–	2	–	0
Mt. San Jacinto	5	–	3	–	0	8	–	3	–	0
Antelope Valley	4	–	4	–	0	5	–	5	–	0
Desert	3	–	5	–	0	3	–	7	–	0
Citrus	2	–	6	–	0	2	–	8	–	0
Rio Hondo	1	–	7	–	0	2	–	8	–	0
Victor Valley	0	–	8	–	0	2	–	8	–	0
Southwestern (CA) *	0	–	0	–	0	4	–	6	–	0
+ – Conference co-champions; * – Southwestern did not play a conference schedule.

1997 Foothill Conference football standings
	Conf.					Overall
Team	W		L		T	W		L		T
San Bernardino Valley $	7	–	1	–	0	9	–	2	–	0
Antelope Valley	6	–	2	–	0	7	–	4	–	0
Chaffey	5	–	3	–	0	6	–	4	–	0
Mt. San Jacinto	5	–	3	–	0	6	–	5	–	0
Citrus	4	–	4	–	0	5	–	5	–	0
Grossmont	4	–	4	–	0	5	–	5	–	0
Southwestern (CA)	3	–	5	–	0	5	–	5	–	0
Desert	2	–	6	–	0	2	–	8	–	0
Victor Valley	0	–	8	–	0	2	–	8	–	0
$ – Conference champion

1998 Foothill Conference football standings
	Conf.					Overall
Team	W		L		T	W		L		T
North Division
Chaffey x	4	–	0	–	0	9	–	2	–	0
San Bernardino Valley	3	–	1	–	0	6	–	4	–	0
Citrus	2	–	2	–	0	6	–	4	–	0
Antelope Valley	1	–	3	–	0	4	–	6	–	0
Victor Valley	0	–	4	–	0	1	–	9	–	0
South Division
Grossmont x	4	–	0	–	0	10	–	1	–	0
Mt. San Jacinto	3	–	1	–	0	9	–	2	–	0
Southwestern (CA)	2	–	2	–	0	5	–	5	–	0
San Diego Mesa	1	–	3	–	0	2	–	8	–	0
Desert	0	–	4	–	0	2	–	8	–	0
x – Division champion/co-champions

1999 Foothill Conference football standings
	Conf.			Overall
Team	W		L	W		L
Mt. San Jacinto $	8	–	0	9	–	1
Southwestern (CA)	6	–	2	8	–	2
Chaffey	6	–	2	7	–	3
Desert	5	–	3	5	–	5
Antelope Valley	4	–	4	5	–	5
Grossmont	3	–	5	4	–	6
San Diego Mesa	2	–	6	4	–	6
San Bernardino Valley	2	–	6	2	–	8
Victor Valley	0	–	8	0	–	10
$ – Conference champion

2000 Foothill Conference football standings
	Conf.			Overall
Team	W		L	W		L
Grossmont $	8	–	0	9	–	2
Southwestern (CA)	7	–	1	9	–	2
Chaffey	6	–	2	9	–	2
Mt. San Jacinto	5	–	3	5	–	5
Antelope Valley	3	–	5	4	–	6
San Bernardino Valley	3	–	5	3	–	7
San Diego Mesa	2	–	6	3	–	7
Desert	2	–	6	3	–	7
Victor Valley	0	–	8	0	–	10
$ – Conference champion

2001 Foothill Conference football standings
	Conf.			Overall
Team	W		L	W		L
Chaffey $	8	–	0	10	–	0
Grossmont	7	–	1	9	–	1
Antelope Valley	5	–	3	7	–	3
Mt. San Jacinto	5	–	3	6	–	4
San Diego Mesa	3	–	5	5	–	5
San Bernardino Valley	3	–	5	4	–	6
Southwestern (CA)	3	–	5	4	–	6
Victor Valley	2	–	6	4	–	6
Desert	0	–	8	2	–	8
$ – Conference champion
