= Shelby Park (Eagle Pass) =

Park in Maverick County, Texas

Location of Shelby Park in Eagle Pass

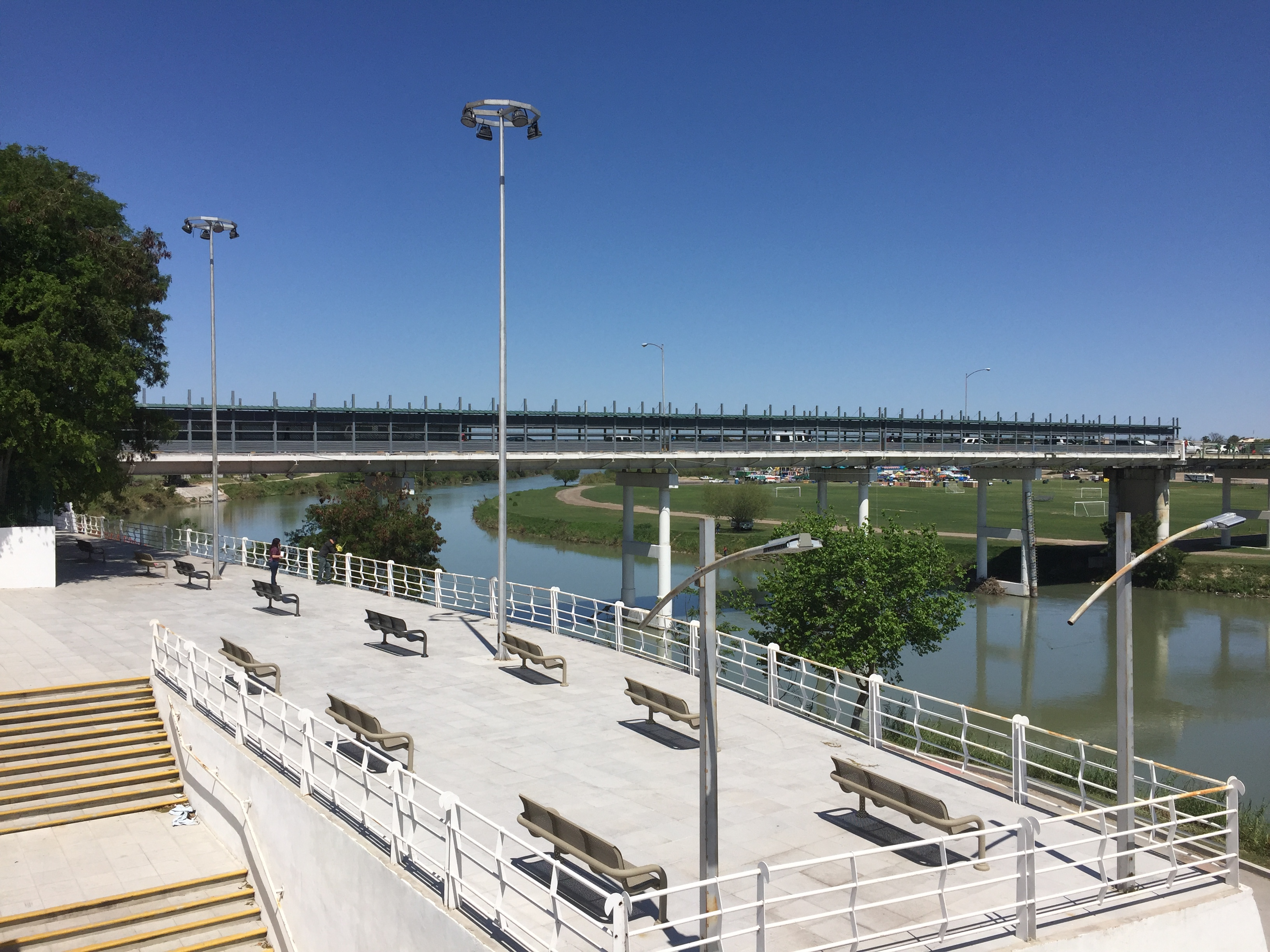
A portion of Shelby Park and the International Bridge seen from the Piedras Negras side of the river.

Shelby Park is located on 47.4 acres (19.2 ha) of parkland on the banks of the Rio Grande River in downtown Eagle Pass, Texas, U.S. The park is owned and maintained by the City of Eagle Pass. It was created using Federal Emergency Management Agency (FEMA) funds after the area was cleared of homes and businesses following major flooding in 1998 and named for Confederate General Joseph O. Shelby, who fled to Mexico through Eagle Pass in 1865.

The park is adjacent to the Eagle Pass–Piedras Negras International Bridge. It consists of two ball fields, two soccer fields, a boat ramp, and parking. Between December 2023 and January 2024, the Eagle Pass Border Coalition used it to erect a memorial consisting of 700 crosses honoring the more than 700 migrants who died on the U.S.–Mexico border in 2023.

In January 2024, it was seized by the Texas National Guard as part of Operation Lone Star to prevent the entry of migrants by installing barriers and razor wire, as well as arresting those who crossed for trespassing. It also inhibited the processing of the migrants by the Border Patrol.
