= Mt. San Jacinto College =

Community college in Riverside County, California, US

- Type: Public community college
- Established: 1960
- Accreditation: ACCJC
- Budget: $169.1 million (2023)
- President: Tawny Dotson
- Students: 25,400 (2023)
- Location: San Jacinto, California; Menifee, California; Banning, California; Temecula, California, United States; 33°48′26″N 116°58′18″W
- Campus: Suburban
- Colors: Black; Red
- Mascot: Eagle
- Website: www.msjc.edu

Mt. San Jacinto College (MSJC) is a public community college in Riverside County, California. It is part of the California Community College system and consists of four locations: San Jacinto (San Jacinto Campus), Menifee (Menifee Valley Campus), Banning (San Gorgonio Pass Campus) and Temecula (Temecula Valley Campus). Classes are also held at numerous satellite locations such as local high schools and online.

== History ==
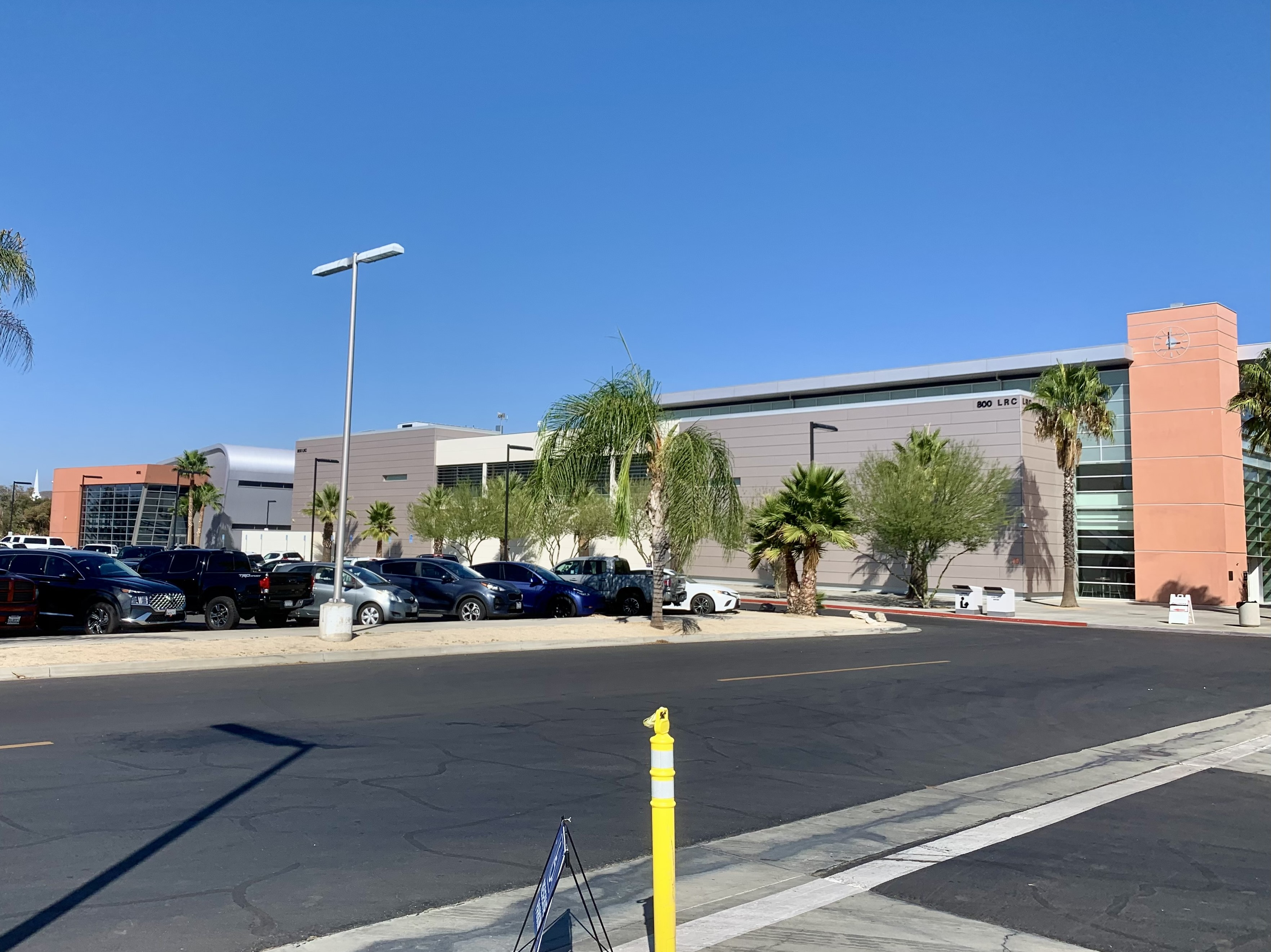
Menifee Valley campus of Mt. San Jacinto College

The Mt. San Jacinto Community College District was formed in 1960 by a vote of the citizens in Banning, Beaumont, Hemet, and San Jacinto.

The college enrolled its first students in the fall of 1963, holding classes in rented facilities in the San Gorgonio Pass and San Jacinto Valley. The college's first president was Milo P. Johnson, whom the library on the San Jacinto Campus is currently named after. The San Jacinto Campus opened in 1965 with two buildings and has since grown into a larger, more comprehensive campus serving the local community. In 1975, the residents of Temecula, Lake Elsinore, Perris, and adjacent areas voted to join the Mt. San Jacinto Community College District, increasing the college's area to the present 1,700 square miles. Although the boundaries have remained stable since 1975, the District has changed dramatically, especially since the 1980s. In recent years, unprecedented population growth has fostered the highest rate of enrollment increase of all 116 California community colleges.

In response to this intense growth, Mt. San Jacinto College opened its Menifee Valley Campus in October 1990. By the end of its first year, there were 2,100 students attending classes at the new campus. Today, the campus serves more than 12,000 students each semester.

The San Jacinto Campus has been master-planned and essentially will be rebuilt over the next 15 to 20 years to accommodate 12,000 to 15,000 students. In the fall of 1993, the Alice P. Cutting Business & Technology Center opened to students with new laboratories for Business, Computer Information Science, Engineering Technologies, Electronics, and Photography. In the fall of 1995, a music building opened on the San Jacinto Campus. The 1995–96 year saw a vast increase in classroom space on the Menifee Valley Campus with the opening of the Allied Health and Fine Arts buildings.

The master plan for the Menifee Valley Campus will ultimately provide for 15,000 to 20,000 students. A new learning resource center on this campus opened during the Spring 2006. The construction of two new childcare centers in 2002 paved the way for a major expansion of the Child Development and Teacher Training Center at MSJC.

On May 19, 2011, groundbreaking began for a new Social Sciences and Humanities building on the Menifee Valley Campus. The state approved funding for the project in 2008, but funding was delayed because of California's budget crisis. Funding was appropriated again in 2010 after the state was able to sell bonds. This new building allowed MSJC to move some classes that were being held in aging portables into the new facility. The new MVC building was available to students by Fall 2012.

On March 20, 2018, Mt. San Jacinto College announced that it had purchased two office buildings on property owned by Abbott Vascular for $56.5 million to open a larger, 350,000 square-foot campus in Temecula. The Temecula campus later opened on August 16, 2021, offering both in-person and online class options.

=== Police chief dismissals ===
The college police chief, Kevin Segawa, was arrested on December 2, 2009, and charged with eight felonies. He pleaded guilty to charges that included bribery, perjury and misappropriation of public funds related to his work at the college and dealings with a tow business owner. He pleaded guilty on June 23, 2010. Other charges stemmed from Segawa allegedly not filling complete arrest reports in two cases, one of which resulted in a civil suit against the college.

The replacement for Segawa, John Ortega, began acting as chief on March 14, 2011. On December 15, 2011, Ortega was placed on paid (salary administrative) leave for undisclosed reasons. On February 9, 2012, MSJC's board of trustees decided not to renew his contract. The college declined to comment on the dismissal, but the Greater Orange News Service reported that Ortega's dismissal may have involved a sex scandal.

On February 2, 2013, a civil trial against the college began. Chris Kuhl sued the college for wrongful termination. Three other officers initially joined in the suit against the college: Ron Navarreta, Scott Jensen, and Pedro Gonzalez. Gonzalez settled with the college, according to court records. The other plaintiff's suits were split into separate trials by a court order.

=== Eminent domain claim ===
MSJC exerted the right of eminent domain to take 30 acres of land owned by Azusa Pacific University, a local private evangelical university. MSJC put down nearly $1.8 million to compensate Azusa Pacific for the condemned land. Subsequent to receiving notice of eminent domain, but before MSJC took possession, Azusa Pacific constructed an educational facility. The university countered the eminent domain action by arguing that MSJC should pay the market value of the land in 2004 when MSJC took possession. This amount was considerably higher than the value of the land in 2000 when MSJC condemned it. The California Supreme Court unanimously decided in favor of MSJC, declaring that the $1.8 million was fair compensation for the land.

== Student body ==
Student Ethnicity By Year (2022)
| | MSJC | Riverside Co. | California CCs | California |
|---|---|---|---|---|
| African American | 5.17% | 7.5% | 5.59% | 6.5% |
| Asian | 1.82% | 7.8 | 11.39% | 16.3% |
| Filipino | 4.05% | N/A | 2.80% | N/A |
| Hispanic | 52.64% | 52% | 46.04% | 40.3% |
| Multi-Race | 15.05% | 3.9% | 3.81% | 4.3% |
| Native American | 0.07% | 2.0% | 0.35% | 0.5% |
| Pacific Islander | 0.32% | 0.5% | 0.40% | 0.5% |
| Unknown | 16.42% | N/A | 6.05% | N/A |
| White | 4.46% | 78.4% | 23.09% | 70.7% |

By Fall 2022, MSJC's student body totaled 15,365, which represented a 14.75% drop in enrollment from 2021.

The age groups of 18–19 (32.2%) and 20–24 (27.9%) make up most of the student age demographics. The 18–19 group has steadily increased from 31.4% in 2018 to 36.2% in 2022. MSJC has an overall younger student body than other California community colleges, with 73.8% of students under 25 compared to 57.7% statewide.

In the 2022–2023 school year 465 MSJC students received an associate's degrees, 985 completed an associates for transfer, a degree geared for students transferring in the state college system, and 188 completed both, making a total of 1,638 AS graduates.

== Academics ==
Mt. San Jacinto College offers Associate of Arts (AA) and Associate of Science (AS) degrees in a variety of disciplines. It also offers coursework required to complete the Intersegmental General Education Transfer Curriculum (IGETC). Many MSJC students choose to transfer to UC, CSU and out-of-state campuses after completing two years of study.

=== Honors Enrichment Program ===
MSJC's Honors Enrichment Program offers accelerated coursework for high-achieving students. The requirements for admission to the Honors Program include a minimum 3.3 GPA, 12 units completed, instructor recommendations, and a letter to the Honors Program Advisory Committee. In order to complete the Honors Program, students must take four Honors classes, as well as an additional non-transferable Honors Seminar. Students often present research papers completed for this class at the Honors Transfer Council of California Student Research Conference. At the 9th annual HTCC Conference in 2009, MSJC had the largest number of students presenting papers of any community college in California. The Honors Program also offers Transfer Admission Priority certification to UCLA upon completion of the required classes. Students who graduate from this program routinely transfer to universities like UC Berkeley, UCLA, UC Irvine, and UC San Diego.

== Student groups ==
=== Cultural activities ===
==== Art gallery ====
MSJC's art gallery, located on the San Jacinto Campus, holds art exhibitions and shows films about art. It showcases work by students and local artists, as well as work by internationally recognized artists. The art gallery is a popular fixture on campus, receiving several hundred visitors every month. Past exhibitions have included works by artists such as Nicholas Spindler, Herbert Olds, and Chuck Huang. Film screenings are usually free and open to the general public.

==== Performing arts ====
There are musical, theatrical, and dance performances on the Menifee Valley Campus and the San Jacinto Campus each semester. The performing arts departments publish brochures each academic year to inform students of upcoming productions.

==== World cinema ====
World cinema screenings are held regularly at the Menifee Valley Campus. Films from around the world are shown at the Learning Resource Center. Films are selected with emphasis on the languages that are taught at MSJC, such as French and Spanish. In previous semesters, films such as Un coeur en hiver, Allá en el Rancho Grande, and Maria Full of Grace have been shown.

=== Honor societies ===
==== NSTEM Honors Society ====
MSJC hosts the Phi Sigma Alpha (ΦΣΑ) Chapter of the National STEM Honor Society (NSTEM), a national organization that promotes excellence in science, technology, engineering, and mathematics among two-year college students. Membership eligibility requires a minimum 3.0 GPA in STEM-related coursework and demonstrated involvement in STEM enrichment activities such as research, competitions, or outreach.

==== Mu Alpha Theta ====
MSJC is also involved in Mu Alpha Theta (ΜΑΘ), the United States mathematics honor society for high school and two-year college students.

==== Phi Theta Kappa ====
MSJC is home to the Beta Delta Omega (ΒΔΩ) chapter of Phi Theta Kappa, the international honor society of two-year colleges. An invitation for membership in Phi Theta Kappa is extended to students who meet the requirements. Applicants must have a minimum 3.5 GPA and at least 12 semester units of coursework completed. Phi Theta Kappa members have access to a multitude of scholarships, the opportunity to wear PTK regalia at graduation, and the chance to be published in Nota Bene, Phi Theta Kappa's honors anthology.

=== Student Government Association ===
The Student Government Association (SGA) is responsible for organizing college events and activities. Membership in the SGA allows MSJC students to vote in campus elections, hold office in student organizations, and participate in college activities. Discounts are offered on and off campus for students who hold current SGA stickers. Campus clubs are managed by the Inter-Club Council (ICC).

== Athletics ==
MSJC's athletics program offers ten sports. Men's sports include football, baseball, basketball, golf, and tennis, while women's sports include softball, soccer, and volleyball along with basketball, golf, and tennis. The official colors of MSJC are black and red, and the school's mascot is the eagle. Sports teams are invariably known as MSJC Eagles. Unfortunately, the growth of MSJC's athletics program has been somewhat hampered by lack of facilities. To remedy this, the college intends to construct a new softball field at the Menifee campus and a new track at the San Jacinto campus sometime in the future.

== Campus facilities ==
=== Learning Resource Center ===
MSJC has Learning Resource Center (LRC) locations on both the San Jacinto Campus and the Menifee Campus. Both LRCs provide free tutoring for all MSJC students, regardless of academic discipline or skill level. Tutoring is provided on a walk-in basis. In addition, each campus has a Writing Center and a Math Center in the LRC to provide one-on-one support for students struggling in these areas. The MSJC Writing Center also provides workshops, handouts and guides, and online writing support. Tutoring at the LRC is performed by professional tutors, peer tutors, and faculty. The San Jacinto LRC alone assists over 4,000 students per year.

==== Supplemental instruction ====
In addition to tutoring at the LRC, MSJC offers Supplemental Instruction (SI) for students in historically difficult courses. Supplemental Instruction Leaders (SILs) provide free one-hour study sessions before or after class, giving students the tools to understand the information they have been given in class. SILs also attend classes to ensure that they are familiar with the material. All students in courses with assigned SILs are encouraged to attend SI meetings, although attendance is voluntary. Since its introduction in Fall 2006, MSJC's SI program at the Menifee Valley Campus has tallied 3,700 student contact hours.

=== Library ===
The San Jacinto Campus library is known as the Milo P. Johnson Library and is named after MSJC's founding president. The Menifee Valley Campus library is located on the second floor of the Learning Resource building. The libraries offer collections of materials in a variety of formats and boast one-on-one reference assistance, library instruction sessions, textbooks on reserve, and space for students to study. The libraries have ample online resources. Online access to e-books and multiple periodical databases such as EBSCOhost and ProQuest is available through the MSJC library website. This collection of online materials supplements the smaller range of print materials available at the Menifee Valley Campus library.

=== Child Development and Education Centers ===
The Child Development and Education Centers serve as the model lab/demonstration program for the Child Development and Education Department and related disciplines. College students perform observations and participate in on-the-job training as well as conduct student teaching in the centers. At the Child Development and Education Centers, child care and education services are provided for young children from diverse backgrounds with differing abilities in a safe and welcoming setting. Responsive and professional teachers and caregivers build trusting relationships with the children and families. Children learn by doing in an environment that offers challenge and support.

== Notable people ==
=== Former students ===
- Mike Anderson, Baltimore Ravens running back, played football for MSJC.
- Dwayne Benjamin, American professional basketball player
- Deaken Bluman, Actor, appeared on 13 Reasons Why.
- Meg Elison, Author
- Christy Hemme, American actress, singer, model, professional wrestling valet and former professional wrestler. Hemme appeared on the April 2005 cover of Playboy magazine, and is currently signed to TNA as a backstage interviewer.
- Jamaal Tinsley, NBA basketball player, played for MSJC from 1997 to 1999.
- Johnny Washington, selected in the 27th round of the 2003 MLB draft by the Texas Rangers. Currently the assistant hitting/first base coach for the San Diego Padres.
