= Chula Vista High School =

Public high school in Chula Vista, California, United States

Coordinates: 32°37′18.52″N 117°4′40.82″W

Location
- 820 Fourth Avenue; Chula Vista, California 91911

Information
- Type: Public
- Motto: Do the right thing
- Established: 1947; 79 years ago
- School board: Sweetwater Union High School District
- Superintendent: Moisés G. Aguirre
- Principal: Jennifer Barker-Heinz
- Teaching staff: 90.78 (FTE)
- Enrollment: 1,864 (2024-2025)
- Student to teacher ratio: 20.53
- Campus: Suburban
- Colors: Blue and white
- Athletics conference: Metropolitan Conference
- Mascot: Sammy the Spartan
- Nickname: Spartans
- Newspaper: Spectrum
- Website: cvh.sweetwaterschools.org

Chula Vista High School (CVHS) is a public high school located in Chula Vista, California. Founded in 1947, it is part of Sweetwater Union High School District.

== History ==
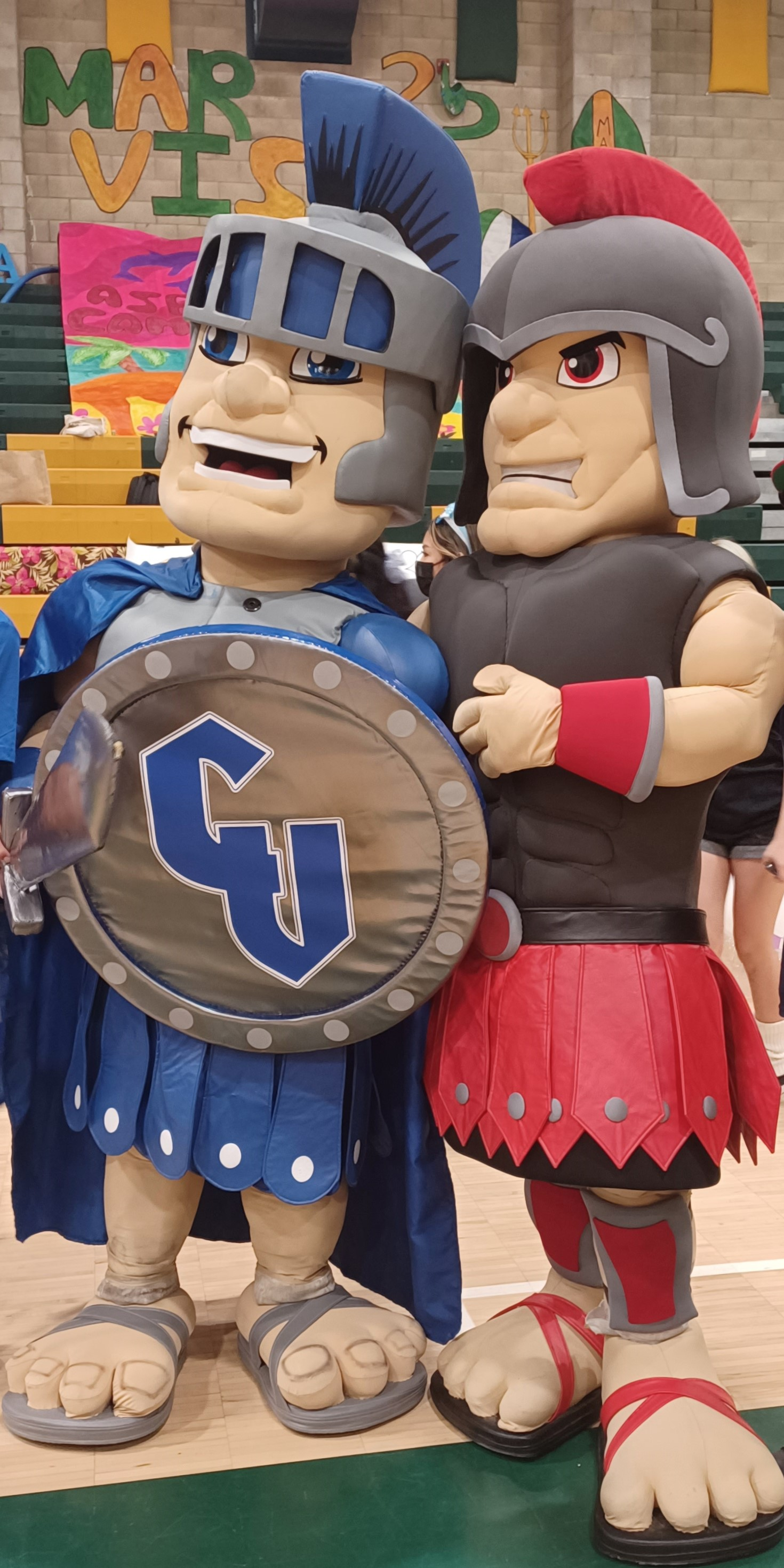
Chula Vista High School mascot standing next to Tommy Trojan, mascot of Castle Park High School.

Chula Vista first opened in the summer of 1947, operating out of a temporary campus in Brown Field Municipal Airport with an estimated student enrollment of 650. By 1949, the student body had grown to just over 900 students between grades 10, 11, and 12; a new school at the intersection of Fourth Avenue and K Street was under construction. A 2006 referendum enabled existing facilities on Fourth Street to become more environmentally friendly; a new performing arts center was also built as a result.

In November 2023, San Diego County leaders recently honored the 25 'Most Remarkable Teens,' with Chris Moya from Chula Vista High recognized for LGBTQ+ activism. Chris founded the Genders and Sexualities Club and the Chula Closet Club at their school, creating safe spaces for peers.

In January 2024, Sweetwater Union High School District launched a voter registration campaign targeting high school students. The effort, led by Student Board Representative Izayah Ringfield and Trustee Marti Emerald, this initiative aims to visit all district high schools and adult education centers by May. The campaign offers eligible students the opportunity to register or pre-register to vote, with assistance from the League of Women Voters and the county registrar.

== Athletics ==
The school's athletic teams are nicknamed the Spartans and competes in the Metropolitan – Mesa League under the South Bay League of the CIF San Diego Section.

== Notable alumni ==
Name	Grad Class	Category	Best Known For
Billy Casper	1950	Professional Golfer	Golf achievements, U.S. Open winner
Tim Danielson	1966	Athlete	American middle-distance runner, Sports Illustrated recognition. Convicted murder
J. Michael Straczynski	1972	Writer/Producer	Creator of "Babylon 5" and other iconic works
Robert Alan Lopez	1977	Music	American singer-songwriter and musician, better known by his stage name El Vez.
Charisma Carpenter	1988	Actress	"Buffy the Vampire Slayer" and "Angel" roles
Donnie Edwards	1991	Football Player	NFL career
Grey DeLisle	1991	Voice Actress	Voice acting in animated TV series
Mario Lopez	1991	Actor/TV Host	"Saved by the Bell," Entertainment hosting
Lee Kohse	1992	Artist	Comic book artistry, creator of notable works
Mary Castillo	1992	Author	Author of mystery novels
Ty Wigginton	1995	Baseball Player	MLB career, All-Star appearance
Walter Emanuel Jones	1988	Actor	Known best for playing the Black Power Ranger in the original series among other works.
Timothy Muris	1967	Lawyer	Chairman of the Federal Trade Commission
Ray Schmautz	1961	Football Player	NFL career

== Notable staff ==
- Drew Westling
