= CIF San Diego Section =

High school sports governing body in California, U.S.

- Abbreviation: CIF-SDS
- Formation: 1960
- Type: NPO
- Legal status: Association
- Purpose: Athletic
- Headquarters: 3470 College Avenue, San Diego, California 92115
- Region served: San Diego County; Imperial County
- Official language: English
- Commissioner: Joe Heinz
- Affiliations: National Federation of State High School Associations, California Interscholastic Federation
- Website: www.cifsds.org

The CIF San Diego Section (CIF-SDS) is the governing body of high school athletics for most of the two southernmost counties of California (San Diego and Imperial Counties), one of ten such sections that comprise the California Interscholastic Federation (CIF). Its membership includes most public and private high schools in San Diego and Imperial counties.

== History ==
Official governance for high school sports in this area began in 1913, when the Southern California Interscholastic Athletic Council (SCIAC) was formed. Previous to that, some individual leagues dated back to the 1890s. The first local high school football game was played at Escondido High School against San Diego High School in 1898. The High School Athletic Association of Southern California was formed in 1904 to create a championship in the sport of track and field, precipitating the need for administering all sports. In 1914, the name was changed to the Southern Section also releasing the acronym SCIAC which was taken locally by the Southern California Intercollegiate Athletic Conference the following year. In 1917, the CIF took over administering sports statewide and the Southern Section became a part of it. The Southern Section was a behemoth, the largest section covering the most populated southern half of the state. In 1935, Los Angeles Unified School District split from the section, forming their own CIF Los Angeles City Section. In 1960, the San Diego Section was formed by carving out San Diego County, initially taking 32 schools. In 2000, Imperial County split from Southern Section and joined with San Diego. In 2013 the section began organizing playoff divisions based on team strength not school enrollment. An Open division was created for the top 8 teams in most major sports.

For the first time in four years, the CIF San Diego Section football finals, including the Open Division Championship, will not be held at Snapdragon Stadium. Instead, games are scheduled to take place at Southwestern College and Escondido High School. The Open Division Championship is set for November 25, 2025, at Southwestern College at 7 pm. Other championship games will also take place at this venue on different dates in November.

== Sports ==
CIFSD sponsors the sports listed below (divisions based on school size).

=== Fall Season ===
- 11-man Football (5 divisions plus an open division)
- Cross country (5 divisions, girls and boys)
- Field Hockey (2 divisions plus an open division)
- Girls Volleyball (5 divisions plus an open division)
- Girls Tennis (3 divisions)
- Boys Water Polo (3 divisions)
- Girls Golf

=== Winter Season ===
- Basketball (Boys and Girls, 5 divisions plus an open division)
- Roller Hockey (Co-ed, 1 division sanctioned by the Metro Conference with other non-Metro Conference High Schools as affiliate members)
- Soccer (Boys and Girls, divisions plus an open division)
- Girls Water Polo (3 divisions)
- Wrestling (Boys, 3 divisions and Girls)

=== Spring Season ===
- Badminton (3 divisions)
- Baseball (5 divisions plus an open division)
- Boys Golf
- Gymnastics
- Lacrosse (Boys and Girls, 2 divisions plus an open division)
- Softball (5 divisions plus an open division)
- Swimming and diving (Boys and Girls, 2 divisions)
- Boys Tennis (2 divisions)
- Track and Field (Boys and Girls, 2 divisions)
- Boys Volleyball (4 divisions plus an open division)

== Leagues ==
- Avocado East League
- Avocado West League
- Central League
- Citrus League
- Coastal League
- Desert League
- Eastern League
- Freelance League
- Freelance League
- Frontier - North
- Frontier - South
- Grossmont - Hills
- Grossmont - Valley
- Imperial Valley League
- Manzanita League
- Mesa League
- Metro League
- Pacific League
- Palomar League
- South Bay League
- Sunset League
- League League
- Western League

== Playoff structure ==
Schools are grouped into divisions, the highest being the Open division.

== Commissioners ==
- 1960–76: Don Clarkson
- 1976–96: Kendall Webb
- 1996–01: Jan Jessop
- 2001–11: Dennis Ackerman
- 2011–20: Jerry Schniepp
- 2020–present: Joe Heinz
