= 1988 Southwestern Apaches football team =

American college football season

1988 Southwestern Apaches football

Mission Conference South Division champion

National Football Foundation and Hall of Fame Bowl, W 20–16 vs. Antelope Valley
- Conference: Mission Conference
- South Division
- Record: 7–4 (5–4 Mission)
- Head coach: Bob Mears (13th season)
- Home stadium: DeVore Stadium

1988 Mission Conference football standings
	Div					Conf.					Overall
Team	W		L		T	W		L		T	W		L		T
North Division
El Camino x	4	–	0	–	0	7	–	1	–	1	9	–	1	–	1
Long Beach	2	–	2	–	0	6	–	2	–	1	6	–	3	–	1
Mt. San Antonio	2	–	2	–	0	6	–	3	–	0	8	–	3	–	0
Pasadena	2	–	2	–	0	5	–	4	–	0	5	–	5	–	0
Cerritos	0	–	4	–	0	0	–	9	–	0	1	–	10	–	0
Central Division
Fullerton x	5	–	0	–	0	9	–	0	–	0	10	–	1	–	0
Saddleback	4	–	1	–	0	7	–	2	–	0	8	–	3	–	0
Rancho Santiago	2	–	3	–	0	5	–	3	–	1	7	–	3	–	1
Golden West	2	–	3	–	0	4	–	4	–	1	5	–	4	–	1
Riverside	1	–	4	–	0	4	–	5	–	0	5	–	5	–	0
Orange Coast	1	–	4	–	0	3	–	6	–	0	4	–	6	–	0
South Division
Southwestern (CA) x	4	–	0	–	0	5	–	4	–	0	7	–	4	–	0
Palomar	3	–	1	–	0	3	–	6	–	0	4	–	6	–	0
San Diego Mesa	1	–	3	–	0	3	–	6	–	0	3	–	7	–	0
Grossmont	1	–	3	–	0	2	–	7	–	0	2	–	8	–	0
San Diego City	1	–	3	–	0	1	–	8	–	0	2	–	8	–	0
x – Division champion/co-champions

The 1988 Southwestern Apaches football team was an American football team that represented Southwestern College as a member of the Mission Conference during the 1988 junior college football season. In their 13th year under head coach Bob Mears, the Apaches compiled a 7–4 record, won the Mission Conference South Division championship, and defeated Antelope Valley in the National Football Foundation and Hall of Fame Bowl.

14 Southwestern players were selected to the 1988 All-Mission Conference South Division football team, including six freshmen. Defensive back Melvin McFarlin was named the Mission Conference South Division Defensive Player of the Year, as well as an honorable mention All-American by J.C. Grid-Wire, after recording eight interceptions in the regular season. The team was led on offense by dual-threat quarterback Anthony Rivera, wide receiver Richard Sanchez, and running backs Tony Herd and Tracy Williams.

The team played its home games at DeVore Stadium in Chula Vista, California.

== Schedule ==
Date	Time	Opponent	Site	Result	Source
September 17	7:00 p.m.	Phoenix*	DeVore Stadium; Chula Vista, CA	W 20–19	
September 24	1:30 p.m.	at Mt. San Antonio	Memorial Stadium; Walnut, CA	L 21–24	
October 1	7:00 p.m.	Golden West	DeVore Stadium; Chula Vista, CA	L 10–14	
October 8	7:00 p.m.	at Rancho Santiago	Santa Ana Stadium; Santa Ana, CA	L 20–56	
October 15	7:00 p.m.	at El Camino	Murdock Stadium; Torrance, CA	L 14–41	
October 22	7:00 p.m.	San Diego Mesa	DeVore Stadium; Chula Vista, CA	W 38–35	
October 29	7:00 p.m.	Pasadena City	DeVore Stadium; Chula Vista, CA	W 20–19	
November 5	1:30 p.m.	at Grossmont		W 28–3	
November 12	7:00 p.m.	at San Diego City	Balboa Stadium; San Diego, CA	W 27–26	
November 19	7:00 p.m.	Palomar	DeVore Stadium; Chula Vista, CA	W 32–25	
December 3	1:30 p.m.	vs. Antelope Valley*	Balboa Stadium; San Diego, CA (National Football Foundation and Hall of Fame Bowl)	W 20–16	
*Non-conference game; All times are in Pacific time
