= 1983 Southwestern Apaches football team =

American college football season

1983 Southwestern Apaches football

South Bay-Kiwanis Bowl champion

South Bay-Kiwanis Bowl, W 24–11 vs. El Camino
- Conference: Mission Conference
- Record: 9–2 (4–2 Mission)
- Head coach: Bob Mears (8th season)
- Offensive coordinator: Jan Chapman Sr. (1st season)
- Offensive scheme: I formation
- Defensive coordinator: Bing Dawson (2nd season)
- Home stadium: DeVore Stadium

1983 Mission Conference football standings
	Conf.					Overall
Team	W		L		T	W		L		T
Saddleback +	5	–	0	–	1	9	–	1	–	1
Citrus +	5	–	0	–	1	7	–	3	–	1
Southwestern (CA)	4	–	2	–	0	9	–	2	–	0
Santa Ana	3	–	3	–	0	4	–	6	–	0
Riverside	2	–	4	–	0	4	–	6	–	0
Palomar	1	–	5	–	0	4	–	6	–	0
San Diego City	0	–	6	–	0	8	–	2	–	0
+ – Conference co-champions

The 1983 Southwestern Apaches football team was an American football team that represented Southwestern College as a member of the Mission Conference during the 1983 junior college football season. In their eighth year under head coach Bob Mears, (Note: Mears was hired ahead of the 1976 season.) the Apaches compiled a 9–2 record (4–2 in conference games), finished third in the Mission Conference, defeated El Camino in the South Bay-Kiwanis Bowl, and were ranked No. 21 in the final J.C. Grid-Wire poll of 1983.

Southwestern hosted the second annual South Bay-Kiwanis Bowl, (Note: Renamed from the San Diego-South Bay Bowl) which pitted the team with the best record in San Diego County against an at-large team selected by the state bowl committee. Southwestern secured their berth with an 8–2 regular season record while El Camino earned an invitation after a runner-up finish in the Metropolitan Conference. The game was cancelled ahead of its third edition in 1984.

Linebacker Harry Leomiti was selected as a second-team player on the 1983 junior college All-American football team by J.C. Grid-Wire, while wide receiver Steve Pierce received honorable mention. In addition, 10 Southwestern players were selected to the 1983 All-Mission Conference football team. Two were named to the first-team offense (Pierce and running back Darnell King) while three were named to the first-team defense: Leomiti, fellow linebacker Irwin Smith, and defensive lineman Chris Cross. Pierce recorded 39 receptions for 672 yards and a conference-best 11 touchdowns in the regular season, and added 13 catches for 260 yards and a touchdown in their bowl game win to earn offensive MVP honors. He later played in the NFL for the Cleveland Browns.

The team played its home games at DeVore Stadium in Chula Vista, California.

== Schedule ==
The annual preseason scrimmage was discontinued due to budget cuts.

Date	Opponent	Site	Result	Attendance	Source
September 17	West Los Angeles*	DeVore Stadium; Chula Vista, CA	W 18–0		
September 24	at Imperial Valley*	Imperial, CA	W 31–0		
October 1	Desert*	DeVore Stadium; Chula Vista, CA	W 51–7		
October 8	at Antelope Valley*	Lancaster, CA	W 28–7		
October 15	at Citrus	Azusa, CA	L 0–31		
October 22	Riverside	DeVore Stadium; Chula Vista, CA	W 22–20		
October 29	at Palomar	San Marcos High School Stadium; San Marcos, CA	W 40–22		
November 5	San Diego City	DeVore Stadium; Chula Vista, CA	W 42–24		
November 19	at Santa Ana	Eddie West Field; Santa Ana, CA	W 7–6	3,000	
November 24	Saddleback	DeVore Stadium; Chula Vista, CA	L 7–10	1,500	
December 3	vs. El Camino*	DeVore Stadium; Chula Vista, CA (South Bay-Kiwanis Bowl)	W 24–11		
*Non-conference game

== Offseason ==
=== Coaching staff changes ===
Head coach Bob Mears took on the additional role of offensive line coach when he was unable to fill the vacancy after the departure of Jay Mack, who also served as offensive coordinator. For Mears, it was the first time in his 20-year career that he coached the offensive line, though he was assisted by ex-Apache players Bill Dowd and Byron King. Likewise, quarterbacks coach Jan Chapman Sr. took on the additional duties of offensive coordinator and wide receivers coach.

Other coaching staff departures included running backs coach Gil Warren, who was hired as offensive coordinator at Castle Park High School in Chula Vista, and defensive backs coach Dan Henson, who was hired as head coach at Christian High School in El Cajon.

=== Player changes ===
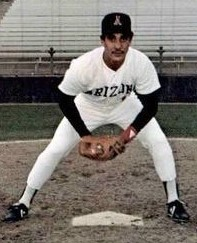
Tommy Hinzo quit the football team ahead of his would-be sophomore season to focus on baseball.

Southwestern lost a majority of its starters from the previous season for a variety of reasons, including graduation, injuries, marriage, and military service. Notably, second-team all-conference running back Tommy Hinzo quit the team to focus on baseball. He went on to sign with Arizona, where he won a national title in 1986, and was selected four different times in the MLB draft before finally signing with the Cleveland Indians.

Starting quarterback and reigning Mission Conference Player of the Year Reid Sholl transferred to Colorado State. The team's other Division I transfers were: running back Eric McDuffie (Cal State Fullerton), offensive linemen Bill Dowd and Dan Knight (both San Diego State), defensive lineman Steve Howe (Illinois), Tevel Holeman (Cal State Fullerton), and defensive backs Dennis Mitchell (Fresno State) and Tony Walker (San Jose State). Wide receiver Steve Pierce received interest from schools such as UCLA, Arizona State, and Illinois, but chose to stay at Southwestern for another year. After the 1983 season, he signed with Illinois and went on the play for the Cleveland Browns.

Southwestern added multiple former Division I players: Harry Leomiti (San Diego State), Kevin Mason (Utah), Clyde Sewell (BYU), and Cortez Grier (Cal State Fullerton). The team also recruited four members of the 1982 all-CIF San Diego Section football team: Greg Steward, John King, Kevin Ludwig, and Jeff Overcast. (Note: The source incorrectly states that another recruit, James Kilmer, earned the same honors. See the 1982 All-CIF San Diego Section football team here:)

== Preseason ==
=== Preseason rankings ===
Southwestern was ranked the No. 17 team in the nation in the J.C. Grid-Wire preseason poll. However, the team was unranked in the California junior college preseason poll. (Note: As compiled by the JC Athletic Bureau)

=== Preseason coaches' poll ===
In the preseason Mission Conference coaches' poll, Southwestern was predicted to finish second in the conference.

Coaches' poll
Predicted finish	Team
1	Saddleback
2	Southwestern
3	Riverside
4	Citrus
5	Santa Ana
6	Palomar
7	San Diego City

== Coaching staff ==
Name	Position
Bob Mears	Head coach / offensive line
Jan Chapman	Offensive coordinator / quarterbacks / wide receivers
Bing Dawson	Defensive coordinator / Linebackers (Note: Dawson is initially reported as the linebackers coach, and is referred to as the defensive coordinator later in the season.)
Mike Pompa	Defensive line (Note: Pompa is initially reported as the defensive coordinator and defensive line coach, and is referred to as a defensive assistant later in the season.)
Walt Justice	Defensive backs
Bill Dowd	Assistant offensive line
Byron King	Assistant offensive line
David Prager	Assistant

== Awards and honors ==
All-American
Player	Position	Team
Harry Leomiti	LB	Second Team
Steve Pierce	WR	Honorable mention

All-Mission Conference
Player	Position	Team
Darnell King	RB	First Team
Steve Pierce	WR	First Team
Chris Cross	DL	First Team
Harry Leomiti	LB	First Team
Irwin Smith	LB	First Team
Walter Holmes	RB	Second Team
Sam Manti	TE	Second Team
Bill Wright	DL	Second Team
Pat Portillo	LB	Second Team
Byron Nichols	DB	Second Team
