= 1985 Southwestern Apaches football team =

American college football season

1985 Southwestern Apaches football

National Football Foundation Bowl, T 35–35 vs. Grossmont
- Conference: Mission Conference
- Record: 9–1–1 (7–1 Mission)
- Head coach: Bob Mears (10th season)
- Co-offensive coordinators: Jan Chapman Sr. (1st season); Gil Warren (1st season)
- Offensive scheme: I formation (first four games); Split backs (remainder of season)
- Defensive coordinator: Bing Dawson (4th season)
- Home stadium: DeVore Stadium

1985 Mission Conference football standings
	Conf.					Overall
Team	W		L		T	W		L		T
Saddleback $	8	–	0	–	0	11	–	0	–	0
Southwestern (CA)	7	–	1	–	0	9	–	1	–	1
Palomar	4	–	4	–	0	6	–	4	–	0
Riverside	4	–	4	–	0	5	–	5	–	0
Citrus	4	–	4	–	0	4	–	6	–	0
Rancho Santiago	3	–	5	–	0	5	–	5	–	0
San Diego Mesa	3	–	5	–	0	4	–	6	–	0
Orange Coast	2	–	6	–	0	2	–	7	–	1
San Diego City	1	–	7	–	0	1	–	9	–	0
$ – Conference champion

The 1985 Southwestern Apaches football team was an American football team that represented Southwestern College as a member of the Mission Conference during the 1985 junior college football season. In their 10th year under head coach Bob Mears, (Note: Mears was hired ahead of the 1976 season.) the Apaches compiled a 9–1–1 record (7–1 in conference games) and finished second in the Mission Conference. They tied with Grossmont in the National Football Foundation Bowl and were ranked No. 10 in the final J.C. Grid-Wire poll of 1985.

Southwestern led the Mission Conference in total defense for the fourth year in a row after allowing 236.2 yards per game in the regular season. They also ranked first in the state in rushing defense by allowing just 48.2 yards per game on the ground. Linebacker Chris Rinehart led the team in tackles while defensive linemen Larry Sandson led the team with 15 sacks. Southwestern also led the conference in passing with a school record 2,630 yards. After ending training camp with seven quarterbacks, the Apaches settled on a three-quarterback system, alternating Brad Platt, Rick Joseph, and Rodney Hill. Platt threw for 1,483 yards and set single-game school records for attempts, completions, and passing yards. The team's other statistical leaders included tight end Guy Liggins, who caught 58 passes for 1,059 yards (both school records) and eight touchdowns, and running back Danny Holmes, who recorded 125 carries for 444 yards. (Note: Bowl game statistics are not included in any of the totals.)

Rinehart was selected as a first-team player on the 1985 junior college All-American football team by J.C. Grid-Wire – as well as the Mission Conference Defensive Player of the Year – while Liggins earned second-team All-American honors. Six Southwestern players were first-team honorees on the 1985 All-Mission Conference football team: wide receiver Willie McCloud; Guy Liggins; defensive linemen Larry Sandson, Tim Wells, and Tony Wells; and Chris Rinehart.

The team played its home games at DeVore Stadium in Chula Vista, California.

== Schedule ==
The 1985 schedule consisted of five home games and five away games in the regular season. The season opener was moved from the normal 7:30 p.m. kickoff to 2:30 p.m. due to a Grateful Dead concert in DeVore Stadium the following day.

On November 14, Southwestern accepted a bid to play in the inaugural National Football Foundation Bowl against Grossmont, who won the Foothill Conference championship and accepted their bid two days prior. It was the first meeting between the two teams since 1977, though Grossmont entered the game with a four-game winning streak in the rivalry.

Date	Time	Opponent	Site	Result	Attendance	Source
September 14	2:30 p.m.	Antelope Valley*	DeVore Stadium; Chula Vista, CA	W 38–0		
September 21	7:30 p.m.	at Imperial Valley*	Imperial, CA	W 45–0		
September 28	1:30 p.m.	at Palomar	San Marcos High School Stadium; San Marcos, CA	W 17–16		
October 5	7:30 p.m.	Citrus	DeVore Stadium; Chula Vista, CA	W 30–24		
October 12	7:30 p.m.	at Rancho Santiago	Santa Ana Bowl; Santa Ana, CA	W 31–16		
October 19	7:30 p.m.	Saddleback^{†}	DeVore Stadium; Chula Vista, CA	L 17–31	2,300–2,400	
October 26	1:30 p.m.	at Orange Coast	LeBard Stadium; Costa Mesa, CA	W 17–7	1,000	
November 2	7:30 p.m.	Riverside	DeVore Stadium; Chula Vista, CA	W 20–9		
November 9	1:30 p.m.	at San Diego Mesa	Merrill Douglas Stadium; San Diego, CA	W 31–24		
November 23	7:30 p.m.	San Diego City	DeVore Stadium; Chula Vista, CA	W 45–0		
December 6	7:30 p.m.	vs. Grossmont*	Balboa Stadium; San Diego, CA (National Football Foundation Bowl)	T 35–35	1,600–1,800	
*Non-conference game; ^{†}Homecoming; All times are in Pacific time; Source:

== Offseason ==
=== Coaching staff changes ===
Former Southwestern offensive coordinator Jan Chapman Sr. returned to the team as co-offensive coordinator and quarterbacks coach. Running backs coach Gil Warren assumed co-offensive coordinator duties as well. Two former Apaches players returned to the team in coaching roles. Dale O'Brien joined the staff as offensive line coach after serving in the same role at Mira Mesa High School, while former defensive back Steve Reed returned to the team as wide receivers coach.

=== Transfers ===
==== Outgoing ====
Outgoing transfers
Name	Pos.	Year	Height	Weight	College transferred to	Source(s)
Theo Barley	DB	Sophomore	6'2"	180	Minnesota	
Marc D'Andrea	OL/TE	Sophomore	6'4"	250	Northern Arizona	
Rich Ehmke	K	Freshman	5'10"	160	Grossmont	
John King	DB	Sophomore	5'10"	173	San Jose State	
Kevin Ludwig	DB	Sophomore	6'0"	185	West Texas A&M	
Rich McGinty	OL	Sophomore	6'0"	230	Sonoma State	

Additionally, quarterback and punter Mike Poteet transferred to United States International University to play baseball.

==== Incoming ====
Incoming transfers
Name	Pos.	Year	Previous School	Source(s)
Alan Brown	DL		Lincoln (MO)	
Mike Gonzales	OL	(redshirt) Freshman	Northern Arizona	
Mike Meehan (Note: Meehan broke his leg in the preseason scrimmage and did not play a single game for Southwestern.)	DL	(redshirt) Sophomore	Long Beach State	
Anthony Reed	DB		San Diego Mesa	
Maurice Sowell (Note: Sowell did not finish the season with the team.)	WR	(redshirt) Freshman	San Diego State	

The team was also bolstered by Rodney Hill, who sat out the 1984 season after transferring from District of Columbia. He was deployed as a goal-line quarterback, running back, kick returner, and punt returner.

== Preseason ==
=== Sports information director' poll ===
In the preseason Mission Conference sports information directors' poll, Southwestern was predicted to finish seventh in the conference.

Sports information director' poll
Predicted finish	Team
1	Saddleback
2	Riverside
3	San Diego Mesa
4	Orange Coast
5	Citrus
6	Rancho Santiago
7	Southwestern
8	Palomar
9	San Diego City

=== Preseason All-Americans ===
Linebacker Chris Rinehart was named a preseason first-team All-American by J.C. Grid-Wire.

=== Preseason scrimmage ===
Southwestern hosted a tri-team preseason scrimmage against Grossmont and Arizona Western on September 6. Darren Pudgil was named the starting quarterback for the season opener based on his performance in the scrimmage, becoming the first Southwestern freshman quarterback to start a season opener since 1980. (Note: Pudgil would later quit the team in October along with fellow quarterback Scott Northeimer after falling down the depth chart.)

== Coaching staff ==
Name	Position
Bob Mears	Head coach
Jan Chapman Sr.	Co-offensive coordinator / quarterbacks
Gil Warren	Co-offensive coordinator / Running backs
Bing Dawson	Defensive coordinator
Steve Reed	Wide receivers
Dale O'Brien	Offensive line
Craig Moffitt	Defensive line
Bill Kinney	Defensive backs

== Awards and honors ==
All-American
Player	Position	Team
Chris Rinehart	LB	First Team
Guy Liggins	TE	Second Team

Annual awards
Player	Award	Ref.
Chris Rinehart	Mission Conference Defensive Player of the Year	

All-Mission Conference
Player	Position	Team
Willie McCloud	WR	First Team
Guy Liggins	TE	First Team
Larry Sandson	DL	First Team
Tim Wells	DL	First Team
Tony Wells	DL	First Team
Chris Rinehart	LB	First Team
Brad Platt	QB	Second Team
Mike Gonzales	OL	Second Team
Keith Tomlinson	OL	Second Team
Santos Gil	LB	Second Team
Tony Gullotto	DB	Second Team
Tyler Ackerson	K	Second Team

12 Southwestern players were selected as first- or second-team honorees on the 1985 All-Mission Conference football team. Eight additional Apaches players earned honorable mention.
