= 1982 Southwestern Apaches football team =

American college football season

1982 Southwestern Apaches football

Mission Conference co-champion San Diego-South Bay Bowl champion

San Diego-South Bay Bowl, W 26–7 vs. Glendale (CA)
- Conference: Mission Conference
- Record: 10–1 (5–1 Mission)
- Head coach: Bob Mears (7th season)
- Offensive coordinator: Jay Mack (2nd season)
- Defensive coordinator: Bing Dawson (1st season)
- Base defense: 3–4
- Home stadium: DeVore Stadium

1982 Mission Conference football standings
	Conf.					Overall
Team	W		L		T	W		L		T
Southwestern (CA) +	5	–	1	–	0	10	–	1	–	0
Saddleback +	5	–	1	–	0	9	–	2	–	0
Riverside +	5	–	1	–	0	8	–	3	–	0
Citrus	3	–	3	–	0	4	–	6	–	0
Santa Ana	2	–	4	–	0	3	–	7	–	0
San Diego City	1	–	5	–	0	3	–	7	–	0
Palomar	0	–	6	–	0	2	–	8	–	0
+ – Conference co-champions

The 1982 Southwestern Apaches football team was an American football team that represented Southwestern College as a member of the Mission Conference during the 1982 junior college football season. In their seventh year under head coach Bob Mears, (Note: Mears was hired ahead of the 1976 season.) the Apaches compiled a 10–1 record (5–1 in conference games), finished in a three-way tie for the Mission Conference championship, defeated the Glendale Vaqueros in the inaugural San Diego-South Bay Bowl, and were ranked No. 13 in the final J.C. Grid-Wire poll of 1982.

Southwestern unexpectedly finished as the Mission Conference tri-champions after Riverside upset previously undefeated Saddleback on the final day of the regular season, leaving all three teams with identical 5–1 conference records and 1–1 head-to-head records. Riverside qualified for their own bowl, the Inland Empire Lions Bowl, and Saddleback had already accepted a berth to play in the Pony Bowl, causing the state bowl committee to scramble to accommodate Southwestern with less than a week's notice. This led to the creation of the San Diego-South Bay Bowl, which was announced five days before the game. It was the first bowl game appearance in the program's 22-year existence.

The team was led on offense by quarterback Reid Sholl, who completed 105 of 199 passes for 1,292 yards and 16 touchdowns, as well as wide receiver Steve Pierce, who had 47 receptions for 782 yards and five touchdowns, and running back Tommy Hinzo, who had 62 carries for 400 yards and four touchdowns on the ground. Sholl was named the Mission Conference Player of the Year and won the Joe Roth Memorial Award, given annually to the top junior college football player in San Diego County. Defensive back Dennis Mitchell led a defensive unit that allowed just 167.1 yards per game, including 38.8 per game on the ground, and recorded 25 total interceptions, all of which set school records. Additionally, defensive back Harry Carroll led the conference with eight interceptions, tying the school record.

The team played its home games at DeVore Stadium in Chula Vista, California.

== Schedule ==
Date	Time	Opponent	Site	Result	Attendance	Source
September 11	7:00 p.m.	at San Diego Mesa*	San Diego, CA	T (preseason scrimmage)		
September 18	1:00 p.m.	at West Los Angeles*	Culver City, CA	W 42–7		
September 25	7:30 p.m.	Mt. San Jacinto*	DeVore Stadium; Chula Vista, CA	W 55–0		
October 9	1:30 p.m.	at MiraCosta*	Oceanside, CA	W 45–21		
October 16	7:30 p.m.	Imperial Valley*	DeVore Stadium; Chula Vista, CA	W 51–14		(Note: The first source incorrectly reports the score as 50–14. The score is amended by the same author in the second source. See more examples here:)
October 23	7:30 p.m.	Santa Ana	DeVore Stadium; Chula Vista, CA	W 24–17		
October 30	7:30 p.m.	at Saddleback	Mission Viejo, CA	L 14–38		
November 6	7:30 p.m.	Citrus	DeVore Stadium; Chula Vista, CA	W 14–0		
November 13	7:30 p.m.	at Riverside	Riverside, CA	W 16–0		
November 20	7:30 p.m.	Palomar	DeVore Stadium; Chula Vista, CA	W 42–0		
November 25	11:00 a.m.	at San Diego City	Balboa Stadium; San Diego, CA	W 33–7		
December 4	7:30 p.m.	vs. Glendale (CA)*	DeVore Stadium; Chula Vista, CA (San Diego-South Bay Bowl)	W 26–7	2,600–3,800	
*Non-conference game; All times are in Pacific time

== Coaching staff ==
Name	Position	Year
Bob Mears	Head coach	7th
Jay Mack	Offensive coordinator / offensive line	2nd
Bing Dawson	Defensive coordinator	1st
Jan Chapman Sr.	Quarterbacks	1st
Gil Warren	Running backs	1st
Jim Frankson	Wide receivers	1st
Mike Pompa	Defensive line	1st
Walt Justice	Outside linebackers / conditioning	
Dan Henson	Defensive backs	1st

== Awards and honors ==
Annual awards
Player	Award	Ref.
Reid Sholl	Mission Conference Player of the Year	
Reid Sholl	Joe Roth Memorial Award (Note: Awarded to the top junior college football player in San Diego County)	
Bob Mears	Mission Conference Tri-Coach of the Year (Note: Mears shared the award with Ken Swearingen of Saddleback and Barry Meier of Riverside.)	

All-Mission Conference
Player	Position	Team
Reid Sholl	QB	First Team
Steve Pierce	WR	First Team
Dan Knight	OL	First Team
Steve Howe	DL	First Team
Irwin Smith	LB	First Team
Dennis Mitchell	DB	First Team
Tommy Hinzo	RB	Second Team
Frank White	RB	Second Team
Bill Dowd	OL	Second Team
Tony Hernandez	OL	Second Team
Byron King	OL	Second Team
Mark Levardo	OL	Second Team
Bill Wright	DL	Second Team
Tevel Holeman	SE (Note: Strong end)	Second Team
Pat Portillo	LB	Second Team
Harry Carroll	DB	Second Team
Tony Walker	DB	Second Team
Gilbert Barksdale	RB	Honorable mention
Kenny Brookins	RB	Honorable mention
Jan Chapman Jr.	WR	Honorable mention
Sam Manti	TE	Honorable mention
Sam Quintana	OL	Honorable mention
David Ledesma	DL	Honorable mention
Alfonso Fernandez	LB	Honorable mention
David Jackson	DB	Honorable mention
Karl Stickradt	PK	Honorable mention
