= Mesa College =

Mesa College may refer to:

- Mesa Community College, a public, two-year community college in Mesa, Arizona
- Colorado Mesa University, a public, liberal-arts university in Grand Junction, Colorado; previously named as Mesa College, then Mesa State College
- San Diego Mesa College, a public, two-year community college in San Diego, California
