= Richard Stevenson =

Richard Stevenson (or Stephenson) may refer to:

== Politicians ==
- Richard Stevenson (MP), English politician, MP for Boston in 1586–1801
- Richard Stevenson (Australian politician) (1832–1899), Australian politician in New South Wales
- Dick Stevenson (Richard R. Stevenson), member of the Pennsylvania House of Representatives

== Others ==
- Larry Stevenson (Richard Lawrence Stevenson, 1930–2012), American inventor of the skateboard kicktail
- Richard Lipez (born 1938), American mystery author who publishes under the pen name Richard Stevenson
- F. Richard Stephenson (born 1941), British astronomer
- Richard Stevenson (poet) (born 1952), Canadian poet
- Richie Stephens (born 1966), Jamaican singer born Richard Stephenson
- Richard J Stephenson (active since 1988), American businessman
- Richard Stephenson (footballer) (born 1949), Zambian footballer
- Rick Stephenson (Richard W. Stephenson), American bodybuilder
- Rick Stevenson, writer, director, and producer
