= Bob Mears =

American college football coach, athletics administrator (born 1933)

Biographical details
- Born: 1933 (age 92–93); Wichita, Kansas, U.S.

Playing career

Football
- 1951–1952: La Junta
- 1953–1955: Western State (CO)

Basketball
- c. 1952: La Junta
- c. 1955: Western State (CO)

Baseball
- c. 1955: Western State (CO)
- Position: Quarterback (football)

Coaching career (HC unless noted)

Football
- 1962–1965: Shafter HS (CA)
- 1966: Channel Islands HS (CA) (assistant)
- 1967–1969: Simi Valley HS (CA)
- 1970–1975: Southwestern (CA) (DC)
- 1976–1989: Southwestern (CA)

Head coaching record
- Overall: 75–65–5 (junior college football)
- Bowls: 4–0–1

Accomplishments and honors

Championships
- Football; 1 Mission Conference (1982); 1 Mission Conference South Division (1988)

Robert Mears (born 1933) is American former college football coach and athletics administrator. He served as the head football coach at Southwestern College in Chula Vista, California from 1976 to 1989.

Mears was born in 1933, in Wichita, Kansas. He attended high school in La Junta, Colorado and then played football and basketball at La Junta Junior College—now known as Otero College in the early 1950s. Mears transferred to Western State College of Colorado—now known as Western Colorado University—earning all-Rocky Mountain Conference honors in football, basketball, and baseball.

Mears was the head football coach at Shafter High School in Shafter, California from 1962 to 1965. He was an assistant football coach in 1966 at Oxnard, California's Channel Islands High School before returning to the head coaching ranks the following year at Simi Valley High School in Simi Valley, California. Mears went to Southwestern College in 1970 as a defensive assistant under head football coach under Wes Foreman. After five seasons as defensive coordinator for the Southwestern Apaches, he succeeded Foreman as head coach in 1976. Mears also served as athletic director at Southwestern and coached swimming and women's softball.

== Head coaching record ==
=== Junior college football ===
Year	Team	Overall	Conference	Standing	Bowl/playoffs
Southwestern Apaches (Mission Conference) (1976–1989)
1976	Southwestern	3–6–1	1–5–1	8th	
1977	Southwestern	2–8	1–6	T–6th	
1978	Southwestern	5–5	2–5	7th	
1979	Southwestern	6–4	3–4	T–4th	
1980	Southwestern	3–6–1	2–4	6th	
1981	Southwestern	4–6	2–4	T–5th	
1982	Southwestern	10–1	5–1	T–1st	W San Diego-South Bay Bowl
1983	Southwestern	9–2	4–2	3rd	W South Bay-Kiwanis Bowl
1984	Southwestern	5–5	3–5	T–5th	
1985	Southwestern	9–1–1	7–1	2nd	T National Football Foundation Bowl
1986	Southwestern	7–3–1	6–2–1	6th	W National Football Foundation Bowl
1987	Southwestern	3–7	2–7	9th	
1988	Southwestern	7–4	5–4	1st (South)	W National Football Foundation and Hall of Fame Bowl
1989	Southwestern	2–7–1	1–7–1	4th (South)	
Southwestern:		75–65–5	44–57–3		
Total:		75–65–5			
National championship Conference title Conference division title or championship game berth
