= Eduardo Oropeza =

American sculptor

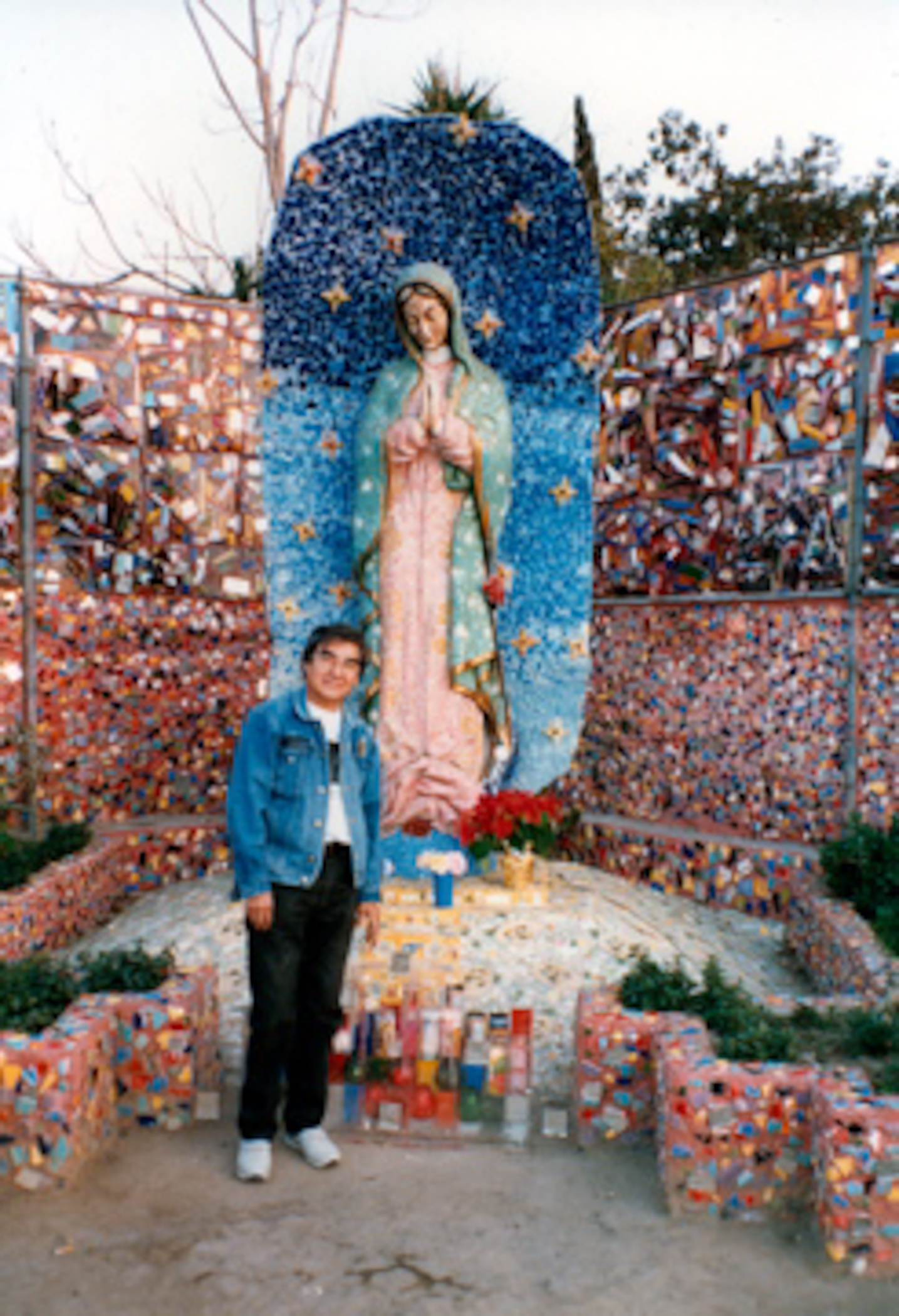
Glenn Green of Glenn Green Galleries portrait of Eduardo Oropeza with his sculpture of the Virgen of Guadalupe at Self Help Graphics Workshop in East LA in 1988

Eduardo Oropeza (1927 – September 11, 2003) is a contemporary artist.

A native of California's Silicon Valley and longtime resident of east Los Angeles, Oropeza began his academic training with Social Studies. After taking an art course, he ultimately changed major and received a Master of Fine Arts degree in sculpture from San Jose State. He follows this with postgraduate work at San Jose, San Diego State at Long Beach and Palomar College.

Oropeza public art work in Los Angeles is a ceramic mosaic on the Self Help Graphics Workshop building located at Ceasar Chavez and Gage streets in East Los Angeles.

Oropeza is represented by Glenn Green Galleries in Santa Fe (Tesuque), New Mexico since 1988. Glenn and Sandy Green met Eduardo at Self Help Graphics Workshop in East LA. With encouragement from the Greens he produced a large collection of bronze sculptures.

Oropeza has exhibited his work at the Scottsdale's Museum of the West, National Museum of Mexican Art, Chicago, Illinois, McNay Art Museum, among other venues.

== Selected collections ==
- LACMA Los Angeles County Museum of Art
- McNay Museum of Art
- Hispanic Research Center, Arizona State University
- City of Sacramento, California
- Eartha Kitt
- Juanita and Michael Jordan
- Black Entertainment Television
- Mary Tyler Moore
- National Museum of Mexican Art, Chicago
- St. Regis Hotel, San Francisco, Ca
- Chris Paul
- Mayor's office, City of Los Angeles, Ca

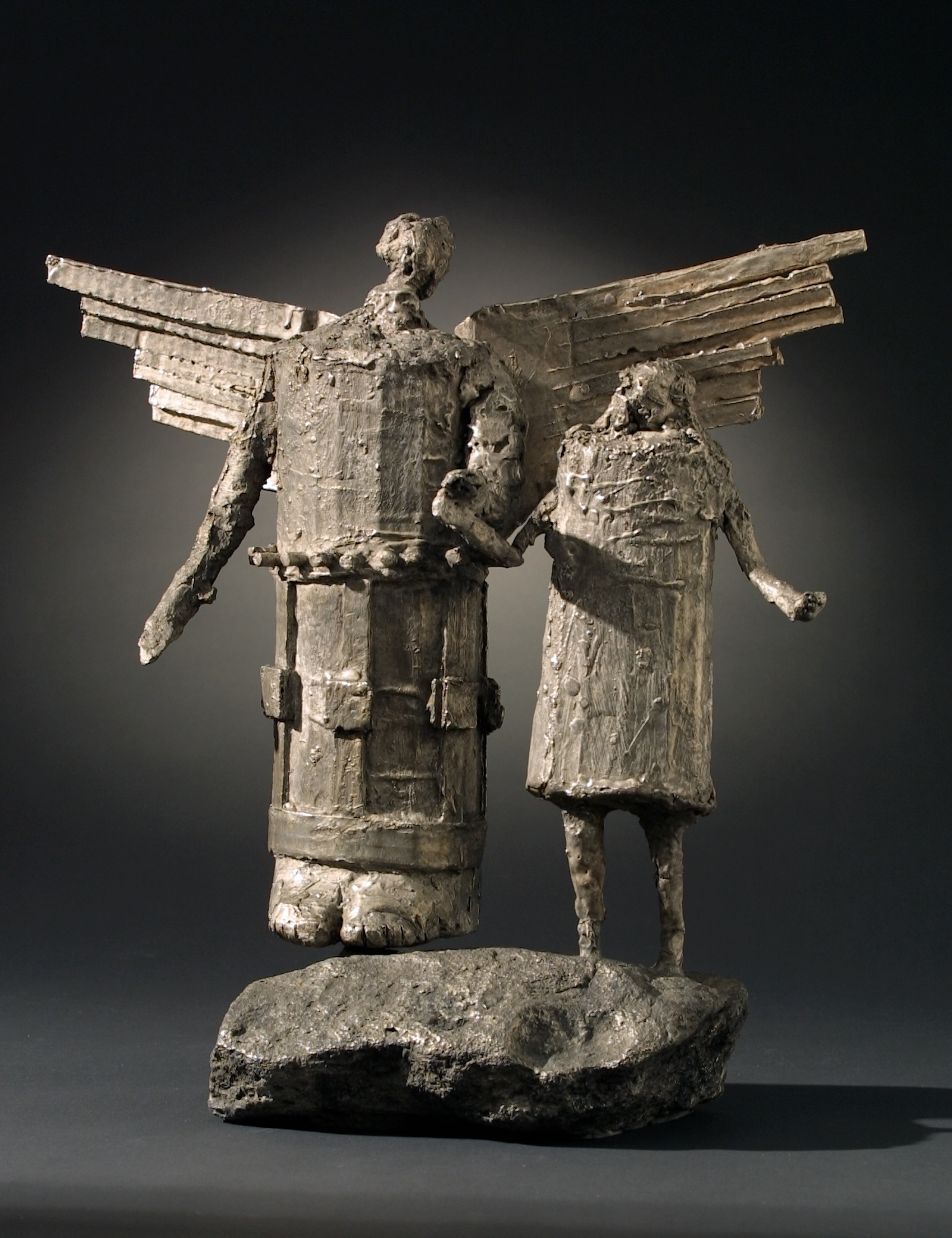

[[

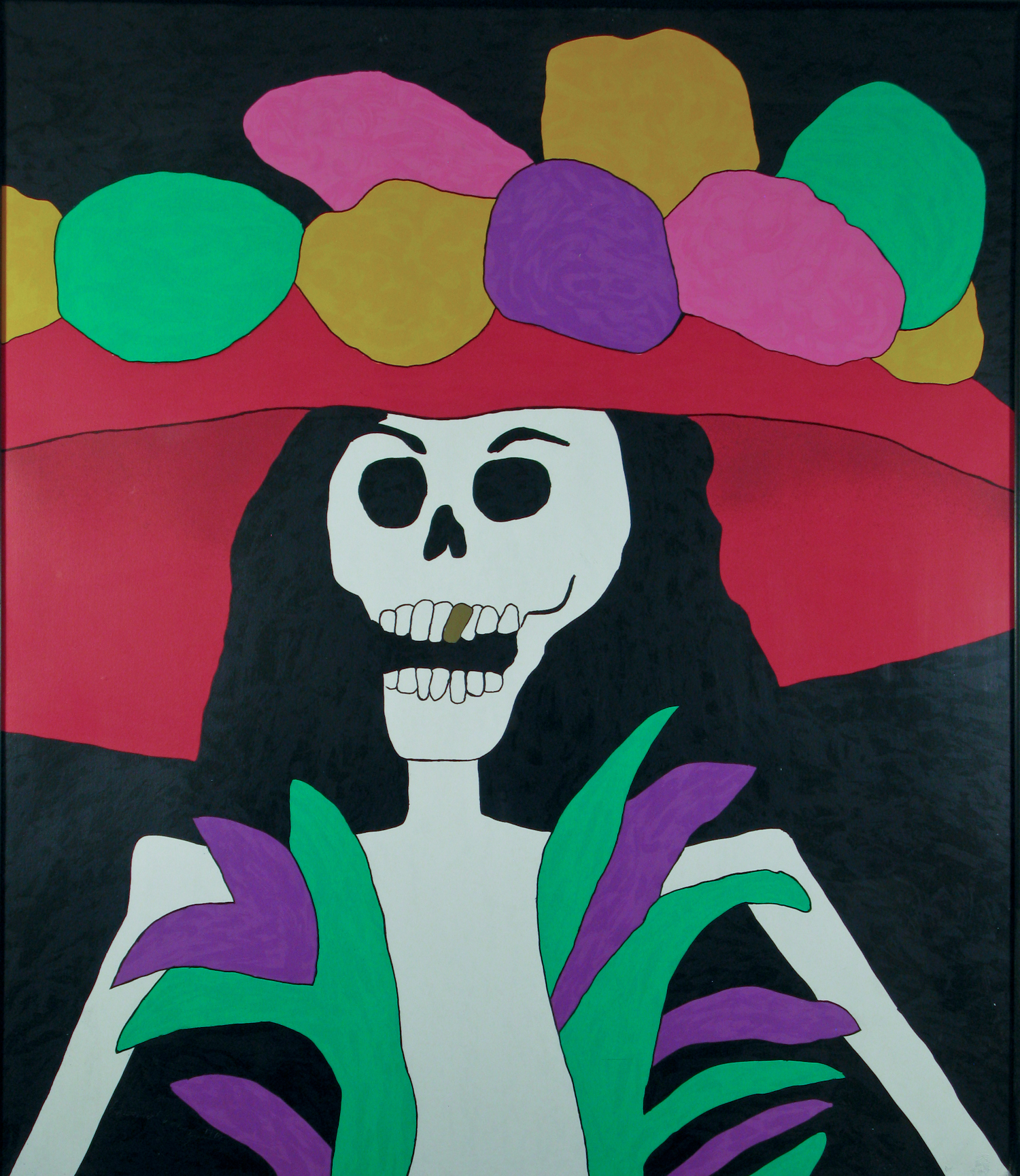

]]
