= Mission Conference =

Junior college athletic conference in Southern California

The Mission Conference was a junior college athletic conference with member schools located in Southern California. It began operation in 1968 as the Southeastern Conference with eight initial members: Chaffey College, Citrus College, Cypress College, Grossmont College, Palomar College, Riverside Junior College—now known as Riverside City College, San Bernardino Valley College, and Southwestern College. In 1969, conference members voted to change the name of the league to the Mission Conference.

== Yearly football standings ==
1968 Southeastern Conference (California) football standings
	Conf.					Overall
Team	W		L		T	W		L		T
Citrus $^	6	–	1	–	0	9	–	2	–	0
Palomar	5	–	2	–	0	7	–	2	–	0
Grossmont	5	–	2	–	0	5	–	4	–	0
Riverside	5	–	2	–	0	5	–	4	–	0
Cypress	3	–	4	–	0	3	–	6	–	0
Chaffey	2	–	5	–	0	4	–	5	–	0
San Bernardino	1	–	6	–	0	1	–	8	–	0
Southwestern (CA)	1	–	6	–	0	1	–	8	–	0
$ – Conference champion; ^ – California state junior college large division playoff participant

1969 Mission Conference football standings
	Conf.					Overall
Team	W		L		T	W		L		T
Grossmont $^	6	–	0	–	0	7	–	3	–	0
Citrus	5	–	1	–	0	8	–	1	–	0
Palomar	3	–	3	–	0	4	–	5	–	0
Riverside	2	–	3	–	1	5	–	3	–	1
Southwestern (CA)	2	–	3	–	1	4	–	4	–	1
Chaffey	2	–	4	–	0	4	–	5	–	0
San Bernardino	0	–	6	–	0	0	–	9	–	0
$ – Conference champion; ^ – California state junior college large division playoff participant

1970 Mission Conference football standings
	Conf.					Overall
Team	W		L		T	W		L		T
Saddleback $^	6	–	0	–	1	8	–	1	–	1
Riverside	5	–	2	–	0	7	–	2	–	0
Grossmont	4	–	3	–	0	5	–	4	–	0
Citrus	3	–	3	–	1	4	–	4	–	1
Chaffey	3	–	4	–	0	4	–	5	–	0
Southwestern (CA)	2	–	5	–	0	4	–	5	–	0
Palomar	2	–	5	–	0	3	–	6	–	0
San Bernardino	2	–	5	–	0	3	–	6	–	0
$ – Conference champion; ^ – California state junior college large division playoff participant

1971 Mission Conference football standings
	Conf.					Overall
Team	W		L		T	W		L		T
Citrus $^	7	–	0	–	0	8	–	3	–	0
Saddleback	5	–	2	–	0	7	–	3	–	0
Southwestern (CA)	3	–	3	–	1	6	–	3	–	1
Riverside	3	–	3	–	1	5	–	4	–	1
Chaffey	3	–	3	–	1	4	–	5	–	1
Grossmont	3	–	4	–	0	4	–	5	–	0
Palomar	2	–	4	–	1	3	–	6	–	1
San Bernardino	0	–	7	–	0	1	–	8	–	0
$ – Conference champion; ^ – California state junior college large division playoff participant

1972 Mission Conference football standings
	Conf.					Overall
Team	W		L		T	W		L		T
Saddleback +^	5	–	1	–	1	9	–	2	–	1
Citrus +	5	–	1	–	1	5	–	4	–	1
Palomar	5	–	2	–	0	7	–	3	–	0
Southwestern (CA)	5	–	2	–	0	7	–	3	–	0
San Diego City	2	–	5	–	0	2	–	8	–	0
Chaffey	2	–	5	–	0	3	–	7	–	0
Grossmont	2	–	5	–	0	2	–	7	–	0
Riverside	1	–	6	–	0	1	–	9	–	0
San Bernardino *	0	–	0	–	0	7	–	3	–	0
+ – Conference co-champions; ^ – California state junior college large division playoff participant * – San Bernardino had a 7–1 record against conference opponents, but was declared ineligible for postseason play and the team's games did not count in the conference standings.

1973 Mission Conference football standings
	Conf.					Overall
Team	W		L		T	W		L		T
Saddleback +	7	–	1	–	0	9	–	1	–	0
San Diego City +^	7	–	1	–	0	7	–	4	–	0
Grossmont	5	–	2	–	1	6	–	3	–	1
Citrus	5	–	3	–	0	6	–	4	–	0
Palomar	4	–	4	–	0	5	–	5	–	0
Southwestern (CA)	2	–	5	–	1	4	–	5	–	1
Riverside	2	–	5	–	1	2	–	7	–	1
Chaffey	1	–	6	–	1	2	–	7	–	1
San Bernardino	0	–	8	–	0	0	–	10	–	0
+ – Conference co-champions; ^ – California state junior college large division playoff participant

1974 Mission Conference football standings
	Conf.					Overall
Team	W		L		T	W		L		T
Grossmont +^	6	–	0	–	2	10	–	0	–	2
Citrus +	7	–	1	–	0	8	–	1	–	1
Saddleback	6	–	1	–	1	8	–	1	–	1
Riverside	3	–	4	–	1	4	–	5	–	1
San Diego City	4	–	4	–	0	4	–	6	–	0
Palomar	3	–	5	–	0	4	–	6	–	0
San Bernardino	3	–	5	–	0	3	–	7	–	0
Chaffey	1	–	7	–	0	1	–	8	–	0
Southwestern (CA)	1	–	7	–	0	2	–	8	–	0
+ – Conference co-champions; ^ – California state junior college Division II playoff participant

1975 Mission Conference football standings
	Conf.					Overall
Team	W		L		T	W		L		T
Citrus +	6	–	0	–	1	9	–	0	–	2
Saddleback +	6	–	0	–	1	7	–	1	–	1
San Diego City	4	–	3	–	0	4	–	6	–	0
Palomar	3	–	4	–	0	5	–	5	–	0
Southwestern (CA)	3	–	4	–	0	4	–	5	–	1
Chaffey	2	–	5	–	0	3	–	7	–	0
San Bernardino	2	–	5	–	0	2	–	8	–	0
Riverside	1	–	6	–	0	2	–	8	–	0
+ – Conference co-champions

1976 Mission Conference football standings
	Conf.					Overall
Team	W		L		T	W		L		T
Citrus $	6	–	0	–	1	9	–	1	–	1
Saddleback	6	–	1	–	0	6	–	3	–	0
San Bernardino	4	–	3	–	0	5	–	5	–	0
Chaffey	3	–	4	–	0	5	–	5	–	0
Riverside	3	–	4	–	0	3	–	6	–	0
Palomar	2	–	5	–	0	5	–	5	–	0
San Diego City	2	–	5	–	0	3	–	7	–	0
Southwestern (CA)	1	–	5	–	1	3	–	6	–	1
$ – Conference champion

1977 Mission Conference football standings
	Conf.					Overall
Team	W		L		T	W		L		T
Saddleback $	7	–	0	–	0	10	–	1	–	0
Chaffey	5	–	2	–	0	8	–	2	–	0
Citrus	5	–	2	–	0	7	–	3	–	0
Palomar	5	–	2	–	0	7	–	3	–	0
Riverside	3	–	4	–	0	4	–	6	–	0
San Bernardino	1	–	6	–	0	3	–	7	–	0
Southwestern (CA)	1	–	6	–	0	2	–	8	–	0
San Diego City	1	–	6	–	0	1	–	9	–	0
$ – Conference champion

1978 Mission Conference football standings
	Conf.					Overall
Team	W		L		T	W		L		T
Saddleback $	7	–	0	–	0	9	–	2	–	0
Citrus	5	–	2	–	0	7	–	3	–	0
San Diego City	5	–	2	–	0	5	–	5	–	0
Chaffey	3	–	4	–	0	5	–	5	–	0
Riverside	3	–	4	–	0	4	–	5	–	0
Palomar	3	–	4	–	0	4	–	6	–	0
Southwestern (CA)	2	–	5	–	0	5	–	5	–	0
San Bernardino	0	–	7	–	0	1	–	9	–	0
$ – Conference champion

1979 Mission Conference football standings
	Conf.					Overall
Team	W		L		T	W		L		T
Saddleback +	6	–	1	–	0	10	–	1	–	0
Citrus +	6	–	1	–	0	6	–	4	–	0
San Diego City	5	–	2	–	0	7	–	3	–	0
Southwestern (CA)	3	–	4	–	0	6	–	4	–	0
Riverside	3	–	4	–	0	5	–	5	–	0
San Bernardino	2	–	5	–	0	4	–	6	–	0
Palomar	2	–	5	–	0	4	–	6	–	0
Chaffey	1	–	6	–	0	2	–	8	–	0
+ – Conference co-champions

1980 Mission Conference football standings
	Conf.					Overall
Team	W		L		T	W		L		T
Saddleback $	5	–	1	–	0	9	–	1	–	0
Riverside	4	–	2	–	0	6	–	4	–	0
San Bernardino	3	–	3	–	0	7	–	3	–	0
Citrus	3	–	3	–	0	5	–	5	–	0
San Diego City	3	–	3	–	0	4	–	5	–	0
Southwestern (CA)	2	–	4	–	0	3	–	6	–	1
Palomar	1	–	5	–	0	1	–	8	–	0
$ – Conference champion

1981 Mission Conference football standings
	Conf.					Overall
Team	W		L		T	W		L		T
Saddleback $	6	–	0	–	0	11	–	0	–	0
Santa Ana	4	–	2	–	0	7	–	3	–	0
Citrus	4	–	2	–	0	6	–	4	–	0
Riverside	3	–	3	–	0	7	–	4	–	0
Southwestern (CA)	2	–	4	–	0	4	–	6	–	0
San Diego City	2	–	4	–	0	2	–	8	–	0
Palomar	0	–	6	–	0	2	–	8	–	0
$ – Conference champion

1982 Mission Conference football standings
	Conf.					Overall
Team	W		L		T	W		L		T
Southwestern (CA) +	5	–	1	–	0	10	–	1	–	0
Saddleback +	5	–	1	–	0	9	–	2	–	0
Riverside +	5	–	1	–	0	8	–	3	–	0
Citrus	3	–	3	–	0	4	–	6	–	0
Santa Ana	2	–	4	–	0	3	–	7	–	0
San Diego City	1	–	5	–	0	3	–	7	–	0
Palomar	0	–	6	–	0	2	–	8	–	0
+ – Conference co-champions

1983 Mission Conference football standings
	Conf.					Overall
Team	W		L		T	W		L		T
Saddleback +	5	–	0	–	1	9	–	1	–	1
Citrus +	5	–	0	–	1	7	–	3	–	1
Southwestern (CA)	4	–	2	–	0	9	–	2	–	0
Santa Ana	3	–	3	–	0	4	–	6	–	0
Riverside	2	–	4	–	0	4	–	6	–	0
Palomar	1	–	5	–	0	4	–	6	–	0
San Diego City	0	–	6	–	0	8	–	2	–	0
+ – Conference co-champions

1984 Mission Conference football standings
	Conf.					Overall
Team	W		L		T	W		L		T
Saddleback $	8	–	0	–	0	9	–	2	–	0
Riverside	7	–	1	–	0	9	–	2	–	0
Santa Ana	6	–	2	–	0	6	–	4	–	0
Orange Coast	4	–	4	–	0	4	–	6	–	0
Citrus	3	–	5	–	0	3	–	6	–	1
Southwestern (CA)	3	–	5	–	0	5	–	5	–	0
Palomar	2	–	6	–	0	4	–	6	–	0
San Diego City	2	–	6	–	0	2	–	8	–	0
San Diego Mesa *	1	–	7	–	0	1	–	9	–	0
$ – Conference champion; * – San Diego Mesa forfeited to Saddleback and Santa Ana.

1985 Mission Conference football standings
	Conf.					Overall
Team	W		L		T	W		L		T
Saddleback $	8	–	0	–	0	11	–	0	–	0
Southwestern (CA)	7	–	1	–	0	9	–	1	–	1
Palomar	4	–	4	–	0	6	–	4	–	0
Riverside	4	–	4	–	0	5	–	5	–	0
Citrus	4	–	4	–	0	4	–	6	–	0
Rancho Santiago	3	–	5	–	0	5	–	5	–	0
San Diego Mesa	3	–	5	–	0	4	–	6	–	0
Orange Coast	2	–	6	–	0	2	–	7	–	1
San Diego City	1	–	7	–	0	1	–	9	–	0
$ – Conference champion

1986 Mission Conference football standings
	Conf.					Overall
Team	W		L		T	W		L		T
Riverside $	8	–	1	–	0	10	–	1	–	0
Southwestern (CA)	6	–	2	–	1	7	–	3	–	1
San Diego Mesa	6	–	2	–	1	6	–	3	–	2
Rancho Santiago	5	–	4	–	0	6	–	4	–	0
Orange Coast	5	–	4	–	0	5	–	5	–	0
Saddleback	5	–	4	–	0	5	–	5	–	0
Palomar	4	–	5	–	0	5	–	5	–	0
Citrus	3	–	6	–	0	3	–	7	–	0
Grossmont	2	–	7	–	0	3	–	7	–	0
San Diego City	0	–	9	–	0	1	–	9	–	0
$ – Conference champion

1987 Mission Conference football standings
	Conf.					Overall
Team	W		L		T	W		L		T
Saddleback $	8	–	1	–	0	9	–	2	–	0
Orange Coast	7	–	2	–	0	8	–	2	–	0
Riverside	6	–	2	–	1	6	–	3	–	1
San Diego Mesa	6	–	3	–	0	7	–	4	–	0
Grossmont	5	–	3	–	1	6	–	3	–	1
Palomar	3	–	5	–	1	4	–	4	–	1
Rancho Santiago	3	–	6	–	0	4	–	6	–	0
Citrus	3	–	6	–	0	3	–	7	–	0
Southwestern (CA)	2	–	7	–	0	3	–	7	–	0
San Diego City	0	–	8	–	1	0	–	9	–	1
$ – Conference champion

1988 Mission Conference football standings
	Div					Conf.					Overall
Team	W		L		T	W		L		T	W		L		T
North Division
El Camino x	4	–	0	–	0	7	–	1	–	1	9	–	1	–	1
Long Beach	2	–	2	–	0	6	–	2	–	1	6	–	3	–	1
Mt. San Antonio	2	–	2	–	0	6	–	3	–	0	8	–	3	–	0
Pasadena	2	–	2	–	0	5	–	4	–	0	5	–	5	–	0
Cerritos	0	–	4	–	0	0	–	9	–	0	1	–	10	–	0
Central Division
Fullerton x	5	–	0	–	0	9	–	0	–	0	10	–	1	–	0
Saddleback	4	–	1	–	0	7	–	2	–	0	8	–	3	–	0
Rancho Santiago	2	–	3	–	0	5	–	3	–	1	7	–	3	–	1
Golden West	2	–	3	–	0	4	–	4	–	1	5	–	4	–	1
Riverside	1	–	4	–	0	4	–	5	–	0	5	–	5	–	0
Orange Coast	1	–	4	–	0	3	–	6	–	0	4	–	6	–	0
South Division
Southwestern (CA) x	4	–	0	–	0	5	–	4	–	0	7	–	4	–	0
Palomar	3	–	1	–	0	3	–	6	–	0	4	–	6	–	0
San Diego Mesa	1	–	3	–	0	3	–	6	–	0	3	–	7	–	0
Grossmont	1	–	3	–	0	2	–	7	–	0	2	–	8	–	0
San Diego City	1	–	3	–	0	1	–	8	–	0	2	–	8	–	0
x – Division champion/co-champions

1989 Mission Conference football standings
	Conf.					Overall
Team	W		L		T	W		L		T
North Division
El Camino x	9	–	0	–	0	10	–	1	–	0
Pasadena	5	–	4	–	0	6	–	4	–	0
Cerritos	5	–	4	–	0	6	–	4	–	1
Mt. San Antonio	4	–	5	–	0	5	–	5	–	0
Long Beach	3	–	6	–	0	4	–	6	–	0
Central Division
Riverside x	9	–	0	–	0	11	–	0	–	0
Rancho Santiago	8	–	1	–	0	10	–	1	–	0
Fullerton	5	–	4	–	0	6	–	4	–	0
Golden West	5	–	4	–	0	5	–	5	–	0
Orange Coast	4	–	5	–	0	5	–	5	–	0
Saddleback	1	–	8	–	0	1	–	9	–	0
South Division
Palomar x	6	–	3	–	0	7	–	4	–	0
San Diego Mesa	3	–	5	–	1	4	–	5	–	1
Grossmont	3	–	6	–	0	3	–	7	–	0
Southwestern (CA)	1	–	7	–	1	2	–	7	–	1
San Diego City	0	–	10	–	0	0	–	11	–	0
x – Division champion/co-champions

1990 Mission Conference football standings
	Conf.					Overall
Team	W		L		T	W		L		T
North Division
El Camino x	4	–	0	–	0	9	–	2	–	0
Pasadena	3	–	1	–	0	8	–	3	–	0
Cerritos	2	–	2	–	0	7	–	3	–	0
Mt. San Antonio	1	–	3	–	0	4	–	6	–	0
Long Beach	0	–	4	–	0	4	–	6	–	0
Central Division
Orange Coast x	4	–	1	–	0	8	–	3	–	0
Riverside	3	–	2	–	0	7	–	4	–	0
Saddleback	3	–	2	–	0	6	–	4	–	0
Fullerton	2	–	3	–	0	7	–	3	–	0
Rancho Santiago	2	–	3	–	0	5	–	5	–	0
Golden West	1	–	4	–	0	5	–	5	–	0
South Division
Palomar x	4	–	0	–	0	7	–	4	–	0
Southwestern (CA)	3	–	1	–	0	4	–	6	–	0
Grossmont	2	–	2	–	0	3	–	7	–	0
San Diego Mesa	1	–	3	–	0	1	–	9	–	0
San Diego City	0	–	4	–	0	0	–	10	–	0
x – Division champion/co-champions

1991 Mission Conference football standings
	Div					Conf.					Overall
Team	W		L		T	W		L		T	W		L		T
North Division
Cerritos x	?	–	?	–	?	7	–	1	–	0	8	–	3	–	0
El Camino	?	–	?	–	?	5	–	3	–	0	6	–	4	–	0
Pasadena	?	–	?	–	?	4	–	3	–	0	6	–	3	–	0
Mt. San Antonio	?	–	?	–	?	3	–	4	–	0	5	–	4	–	0
Long Beach	?	–	?	–	?	1	–	6	–	0	1	–	8	–	0
Central Division
Saddleback x	5	–	0	–	0	8	–	1	–	0	10	–	1	–	0
Fullerton	3	–	2	–	0	7	–	2	–	0	8	–	3	–	0
Riverside	3	–	2	–	0	4	–	5	–	0	4	–	6	–	0
Golden West	2	–	3	–	0	5	–	4	–	0	6	–	4	–	0
Orange Coast	1	–	4	–	0	5	–	4	–	0	6	–	4	–	0
Rancho Santiago	1	–	4	–	0	1	–	8	–	0	2	–	8	–	0
South Division
Palomar x	?	–	?	–	?	8	–	0	–	0	10	–	1	–	0
Grossmont	?	–	?	–	?	3	–	5	–	0	3	–	5	–	1
San Diego Mesa	?	–	?	–	?	3	–	5	–	0	3	–	7	–	0
Southwestern (CA)	?	–	?	–	?	2	–	5	–	0	4	–	5	–	0
San Diego City	?	–	?	–	?	0	–	7	–	0	0	–	9	–	0
x – Division champion/co-champions

1992 Mission Conference football standings
	Div					Conf.					Overall
Team	W		L		T	W		L		T	W		L		T
North Division
El Camino x	3	–	1	–	0	8	–	1	–	0	8	–	3	–	0
Mt. San Antonio x	3	–	1	–	0	8	–	1	–	0	8	–	3	–	0
Pasadena	2	–	2	–	0	7	–	2	–	0	9	–	2	–	0
Long Beach	1	–	3	–	0	4	–	4	–	1	4	–	5	–	1
Cerritos	1	–	3	–	0	4	–	5	–	0	5	–	5	–	0
Central Division
Saddleback x	5	–	0	–	0	9	–	0	–	0	11	–	0	–	0
Orange Coast	4	–	1	–	0	6	–	3	–	0	7	–	4	–	0
Golden West	2	–	3	–	0	4	–	5	–	0	4	–	6	–	0
Rancho Santiago	2	–	3	–	0	2	–	7	–	0	3	–	7	–	0
Riverside	1	–	4	–	0	1	–	7	–	1	1	–	8	–	1
Fullerton	1	–	4	–	0	0	–	8	–	0	0	–	9	–	0
South Division
Palomar x	3	–	0	–	0	8	–	1	–	0	10	–	1	–	0
San Diego Mesa	1	–	1	–	1	3	–	5	–	1	3	–	6	–	1
Southwestern (CA)	1	–	2	–	0	1	–	8	–	0	2	–	8	–	0
Grossmont	0	–	2	–	1	1	–	7	–	1	1	–	7	–	2
x – Division champion/co-champions

1993 Mission Conference football standings
	Div					Conf.					Overall
Team	W		L		T	W		L		T	W		L		T
North Division
Long Beach x	3	–	1	–	0	9	–	1	–	0	9	–	2	–	0
Mt. San Antonio x	3	–	1	–	0	8	–	2	–	0	9	–	2	–	0
Cerritos	2	–	2	–	0	7	–	2	–	0	7	–	3	–	1
Pasadena	1	–	3	–	0	3	–	6	–	0	3	–	7	–	0
El Camino	1	–	3	–	0	2	–	8	–	0	2	–	8	–	0
Central Division
Riverside x	5	–	0	–	0	6	–	3	–	0	7	–	4	–	0
Orange Coast	4	–	1	–	0	7	–	3	–	0	8	–	3	–	0
Saddleback	2	–	3	–	0	4	–	5	–	0	5	–	5	–	0
Golden West	2	–	3	–	0	4	–	6	–	0	4	–	6	–	0
Rancho Santiago	2	–	3	–	0	4	–	5	–	1	4	–	5	–	1
Fullerton	0	–	5	–	0	3	–	7	–	0	3	–	7	–	0
South Division
Palomar x	3	–	0	–	0	8	–	0	–	0	11	–	0	–	0
San Diego Mesa	2	–	1	–	0	2	–	7	–	0	3	–	7	–	0
Southwestern (CA)	1	–	2	–	0	1	–	7	–	0	3	–	7	–	0
Grossmont	0	–	3	–	0	1	–	7	–	0	2	–	8	–	0
x – Division champion/co-champions

1994 Mission Conference football standings
	Conf.					Overall
Team	W		L		T	W		L		T
North Division
Long Beach x	6	–	0	–	0	9	–	2	–	0
El Camino	5	–	1	–	0	9	–	2	–	0
Palomar	4	–	2	–	0	8	–	3	–	0
Cerritos	3	–	3	–	0	8	–	3	–	0
San Diego Mesa	2	–	4	–	0	5	–	5	–	0
Pasadena	1	–	5	–	0	2	–	7	–	1
Mt. San Antonio	0	–	6	–	0	3	–	6	–	1
Central Division
Rancho Santiago x	6	–	0	–	0	9	–	2	–	0
Fullerton	5	–	1	–	0	7	–	3	–	1
Riverside	3	–	3	–	0	4	–	6	–	0
Golden West	2	–	3	–	1	2	–	6	–	2
Orange Coast	2	–	4	–	0	2	–	8	–	0
Saddleback	1	–	3	–	2	1	–	7	–	2
Southwestern (CA)	0	–	5	–	1	0	–	9	–	1
x – Division champion/co-champions

1995 Mission Conference football standings
	Conf.					Overall
Team	W		L		T	W		L		T
North Division
Long Beach x	6	–	0	–	0	10	–	0	–	0
Mt. San Antonio	4	–	2	–	0	8	–	2	–	0
El Camino	4	–	2	–	0	7	–	4	–	0
Cerritos	3	–	3	–	0	5	–	4	–	1
Palomar	2	–	4	–	0	5	–	5	–	0
Pasadena	2	–	4	–	0	4	–	6	–	0
San Diego Mesa	0	–	6	–	0	0	–	10	–	0
Central Division
Saddleback x	5	–	1	–	0	7	–	3	–	0
Rancho Santiago	4	–	2	–	0	6	–	4	–	0
Fullerton	4	–	2	–	0	4	–	5	–	1
Golden West	3	–	3	–	0	5	–	5	–	0
Orange Coast	3	–	3	–	0	4	–	6	–	0
Riverside	2	–	4	–	0	4	–	8	–	0
Southwestern (CA)	0	–	6	–	0	2	–	8	–	0
x – Division champion/co-champions

1996 Mission Conference football standings
	Div					Conf.					Overall
Team	W		L		T	W		L		T	W		L		T
North Division
Long Beach x	4	–	1	–	0	8	–	2	–	0	8	–	3	–	0
El Camino x	4	–	1	–	0	7	–	3	–	0	8	–	3	–	0
Cerritos	3	–	2	–	0	8	–	2	–	0	9	–	2	–	0
Mt. San Antonio	3	–	2	–	0	6	–	3	–	0	8	–	3	–	0
Pasadena	1	–	4	–	0	1	–	7	–	0	1	–	9	–	0
San Diego Mesa	0	–	5	–	0	0	–	7	–	0	0	–	10	–	0
Central Division
Saddleback x	6	–	0	–	0	10	–	0	–	0	11	–	0	–	0
Palomar x	4	–	2	–	0	6	–	4	–	0	6	–	4	–	0
Rancho Santiago	4	–	2	–	0	6	–	4	–	0	6	–	4	–	0
Fullerton	3	–	3	–	0	5	–	5	–	0	5	–	5	–	0
Riverside	3	–	3	–	0	3	–	6	–	0	3	–	7	–	0
Golden West	1	–	5	–	0	1	–	9	–	0	1	–	9	–	0
Orange Coast	0	–	6	–	0	1	–	9	–	0	1	–	9	–	0
x – Division champion/co-champions

1997 Mission Conference football standings
	Div					Conf.					Overall
Team	W		L		T	W		L		T	W		L		T
North Division
Mt. San Antonio x	5	–	0	–	0	10	–	0	–	0	11	–	0	–	0
El Camino	4	–	1	–	0	7	–	3	–	0	8	–	3	–	0
Long Beach	3	–	2	–	0	8	–	2	–	0	9	–	2	–	0
Pasadena	2	–	3	–	0	3	–	6	–	0	4	–	6	–	0
Cerritos	1	–	4	–	0	5	–	5	–	0	5	–	5	–	0
San Diego Mesa	0	–	5	–	0	0	–	8	–	0	0	–	10	–	0
Central Division
Santa Ana x	6	–	0	–	0	7	–	3	–	0	8	–	3	–	0
Saddleback	4	–	2	–	0	6	–	4	–	0	6	–	4	–	0
Palomar	3	–	3	–	0	5	–	5	–	0	6	–	5	–	0
Fullerton	3	–	3	–	0	5	–	5	–	0	5	–	5	–	0
Riverside	3	–	3	–	0	3	–	6	–	0	4	–	6	–	0
Golden West	1	–	5	–	0	3	–	7	–	0	3	–	7	–	0
Orange Coast	1	–	5	–	0	1	–	9	–	0	1	–	9	–	0
x – Division champion/co-champions

1998 Mission Conference football standings
	Div					Conf.					Overall
Team	W		L		T	W		L		T	W		L		T
North Division
Long Beach x	5	–	0	–	0	10	–	0	–	0	10	–	1	–	0
Cerritos	4	–	1	–	0	8	–	2	–	0	9	–	2	–	0
Mt. San Antonio	3	–	2	–	0	7	–	3	–	0	7	–	3	–	0
El Camino	2	–	3	–	0	7	–	3	–	0	7	–	4	–	0
Pasadena	1	–	4	–	0	4	–	6	–	0	4	–	6	–	0
Orange Coast	0	–	5	–	0	3	–	7	–	0	3	–	7	–	0
Central Division
Palomar x	5	–	0	–	0	9	–	1	–	0	10	–	1	–	0
Santa Ana	4	–	1	–	0	4	–	6	–	0	4	–	6	–	0
Fullerton	2	–	3	–	0	3	–	7	–	0	3	–	7	–	0
Riverside	2	–	3	–	0	3	–	7	–	0	3	–	7	–	0
Saddleback	2	–	3	–	0	2	–	8	–	0	2	–	8	–	0
Golden West	0	–	5	–	0	0	–	10	–	0	0	–	10	–	0
x – Division champion/co-champions

1999 Mission Conference football standings
	Conf.			Overall
Team	W		L	W		L
North Division
Mt. San Antonio x	5	–	0	8	–	2
El Camino	4	–	1	8	–	3
Cerritos	3	–	2	7	–	3
Orange Coast	2	–	3	4	–	6
Long Beach	1	–	4	4	–	6
Pasadena	0	–	5	4	–	6
Central Division
Palomar x	4	–	1	8	–	2
Santa Ana x	4	–	1	7	–	3
Riverside	3	–	2	4	–	6
Saddleback	2	–	3	4	–	6
Fullerton	2	–	3	3	–	7
Golden West	0	–	5	0	–	10
x – Division champion/co-champions

2000 Mission Conference football standings
	Conf.			Overall
Team	W		L	W		L
North Division
El Camino x	4	–	1	9	–	2
Mt. San Antonio x	4	–	1	9	–	2
Cerritos	2	–	3	8	–	3
Riverside	2	–	3	6	–	4
Long Beach	2	–	3	4	–	6
Pasadena	1	–	4	5	–	5
Central Division
Palomar x	4	–	1	7	–	4
Orange Coast x	4	–	1	7	–	4
Fullerton	3	–	2	4	–	6
Saddleback	2	–	3	3	–	7
Santa Ana	2	–	3	2	–	8
Golden West	0	–	5	0	–	10
x – Division champion/co-champions

2001 Mission Conference football standings
	Div			Conf.			Overall
Team	W		L	W		L	W		L
North Division
Pasadena x	4	–	1	7	–	1	9	–	1
Long Beach	3	–	2	4	–	4	6	–	4
Cerritos	2	–	3	5	–	3	6	–	4
Mt. San Antonio	2	–	3	4	–	4	5	–	5
El Camino	2	–	3	4	–	4	5	–	5
Riverside	2	–	3	3	–	5	4	–	6
Central Division
Palomar x	5	–	0	7	–	1	9	–	1
Saddleback	4	–	1	6	–	2	7	–	3
Fullerton	3	–	2	4	–	4	6	–	4
Orange Coast	1	–	4	2	–	6	3	–	7
Santa Ana	1	–	4	1	–	7	3	–	7
Golden West	1	–	4	1	–	7	2	–	8
x – Division champion/co-champions
