= Steve Pierce (American football) =

American football player (born 1963)

No. 28
- Position: Wide receiver

Personal information
- Born: December 12, 1963 (age 62); San Diego, California, U.S.
- Listed height: 5 ft 10 in (1.78 m)
- Listed weight: 190 lb (86 kg)

Career information
- High school: Lincoln (San Diego)
- College: Southwestern (CA); Illinois
- NFL draft: 1987: undrafted

Career history
- Cleveland Browns (1987)

Awards and highlights
- Second-team All-Big Ten (1986); 2× First-team all-Mission Conference (1982, 1983)

Career NFL statistics
- Receptions: 2
- Receiving yards: 21
- Stats at Pro Football Reference

Stephen Nathan Pierce (born December 12, 1963) is an American former professional football player who was a wide receiver for the Cleveland Browns of the National Football League (NFL). He played college football for the Illinois Fighting Illini.

Pierce was born on December 12, 1963, in San Diego, California, and attended Lincoln High School, where he participated in football, baseball, and wrestling. He gave up baseball to play football at Southwestern College in Chula Vista, California. Pierce led the Apaches to a 19–3 combined record in 1982 and 1983, and was the offensive MVP of the 1983 South Bay-Kiwanis Bowl after he recorded 13 receptions for 260 yards and a touchdown in the 24–11 win over El Camino. He was a two-time first-team all-Mission Conference selection. Pierce was inducted into the Southwestern College Athletic Hall of Fame in 2011.

Following his sophomore season, Pierce transferred to Illinois. However, he broke his foot in the preseason and took a redshirt in 1984. In 1985, Pierce recorded 49 receptions for 614 yards and two touchdowns, earning all-Big Ten Conference honorable mention from the Associated Press (AP). In 1986, he recorded 43 receptions for 602 yards and three touchdowns, earning second-team all-Big Ten honors. Pierce earned a bachelor's degree in political science.

In September 1987, Pierce signed with the Cleveland Browns as a replacement player during the 1987 NFL strike. He played in two games, recording two receptions for 21 yards.
