= Joyce Cutler–Shaw =

American multidisciplinary artist (1932–2018)

- Born: Joyce Arlene Cutler; June 25, 1932; Detroit, Michigan, United States
- Died: March 18, 2018 (aged 85); San Diego, California, United States
- Education: New York University (BA), University of California, San Diego (MFA)
- Occupations: Visual artist, illustrator, educator
- Known for: Installation art, performance art, artists books, drawings, multimedia art, conceptual art
- Movement: Ecoart
- Spouse: Jerome Shaw (m. c. 1958–2018; death)
- Children: 3

Joyce Arlene Cutler–Shaw (née Joyce Cutler; 1932–2018) was an American multidisciplinary artist, illustrator, and educator. She is known for her drawings of human and small animal bones. She also worked in many other mediums, including in installation art, sculpture, performance art, multimedia art, and artist books. Cutler–Shaw was also the founder of the Landmark Art Project, Inc., and Landmark Art Collaborative.

== Early life and education ==
Joyce Cutler was born on June 25, 1932 in Detroit, Michigan, and was raised in New York.

She studied at New York University, and received a B.A. degree in 1953, followed by further study at the University of California, San Diego (UCSD), where she received a M.F.A. degree in 1972, in the first M.F.A. graduating class in visual arts at the university.

She was married to Jerome "Jerry" Shaw in the 1950s, and together they had three children.

== Career ==
Cutler–Shaw taught at the University of California, San Diego Extension (1972 to 1974), Palomar College (1974 to 1978), and at San Diego State University (1978 to 1980). She served in an artist-in-residence from 1992 to 2015, at the University of California, San Diego School of Medicine. Her artwork often focused on the cycle of life and death. While in graduate school, she frequently visited the UCSD School of Medicine to draw the dead bodies and bones. Cutler–Shaw launched the artist-in-residence program in 1992, and served as the first artist.

Cutler–Shaw was the founder of the Landmark Art Project, Inc., and Landmark Art Collaborative (1985 to 1992). She had an "Art and Artist Lecture Series," which consists of interviews with visual artists that were documented on video, which included David Antin, Eleanor Antin, Edward Rusha, Christo, Allan Kaprow, John Cage, and John Baldessari.

She was part of the group exhibition 'Women of the Book" (1998) which traveled to four locations in Los Angeles, including to Finegood Art Gallery, the West Valley Jewish Community Center, 22622 Vanowen St., and West Hills Gallery. In 2007, Cutler–Shaw had a two person show alongside artist Sarah Perry, featuring drawings of the bones of small animals at the USC Fisher Museum of Art in Los Angeles.

== Death and legacy ==
Cutler–Shaw died on March 18, 2018, in San Diego, after struggling with a progressive neurological disease called corticobasal degeneration.

The UC San Diego Library’s Special Collections & Archives holds the Cutler–Shaw Papers. She has work in museum collections, including at the Walker Art Center.

She was the subject of the documentary film She is Fierce: the Art of Joyce Cutler-Shaw (2016), directed by Becky Cohen.
