= Michelle Ozbun =

American molecular virologist

Michelle Adair Ozbun
- Born: 1965 (age 60–61)
- Education: Baylor College of Medicine; Colorado State University; Colorado Mesa University
- Spouse(s): Amy S. Gardiner, PhD
- Children: Ridge, Xander
- Scientific career
- Fields: Molecular Virology, Human Papillomavirus Infections, Epithelial Tissue Biology, Keratinocyte Biology, Cancer Biology
- Workplaces: Pennsylvania State University College of Medicine; University of New Mexico School of Medicine
- Thesis: P53 mutations and mammary preneoplasia in the mouse (1994)

Michelle Adair Ozbun (born February 16, 1965) is an American molecular virologist who is a Distinguished Professor and the Maralyn S. Budke Endowed Professor in Viral Oncology at the University of New Mexico School of Medicine. Her research focus is on how human papillomavirus (HPV) infections cause pathology including proliferative lesions that can progress to cancers.

== Early life and education ==
Ozbun received an associate of science degree from Mesa College in 1994. (now Colorado Mesa University), where she was recognized as a Distinguished Alumnus in 2009. She was an undergraduate student in microbiology and chemistry at Colorado State University and earned a B.S. degree in 1987. She completed her PhD in molecular virology under the supervision of Janet S. Butel at the Baylor College of Medicine in 1994. She completed a postdoctoral fellowship at Pennsylvania State University College of Medicine in the laboratory of Dr. Craig Meyers.

== Research and career ==
In 1998, Ozbun was appointed to the faculty at the University of New Mexico, where she has held an endowed chair in viral oncology since 2014. She was promoted to UNM Distinguished Professor in 2026.

Ozbun's research involves human and animal papillomaviruses, which are etiologic agents of tumors of the skin and mucous membranes. These tumors can be benign (e.g. genital warts, plantar warts) and malignant (e.g. anogenital cancers and cervical carcinomas). Her research looks to understand the replicative cycles of papillomaviruses and their differentiation-dependent replicative cycles through the use of organotypic cell culture. Disruptions to these replicative cycles can result in malignancies. She studies the relationships between human papillomavirus infection and cancer, studying the molecular mechanisms that underpin viral infection, the stages of infection that permit or deny how viral persistence is established.

Ozbun developed a strategy to measure how many infectious human papillomavirus particles are left on a surface following disinfection.

== Selected publications ==
- C. Meyers; T. J. Mayer; M. A. Ozbun (1997). "Synthesis of infectious human papillomavirus type 18 in differentiating epithelium transfected with viral DNA" (PDF). Journal of Virology. 71 (10): 7381–7386. doi:10.1128/jvi.71.10.7381-7386.1997. PMC 192083. PMID 9311816. Wikidata Q35895308.
- Zurab Surviladze; Rosa T Sterk; Sergio A DeHaro; Michelle A Ozbun (2012). "Cellular entry of human papillomavirus type 16 involves activation of the phosphatidylinositol 3-kinase/Akt/mTOR pathway and inhibition of autophagy". Journal of Virology. 87 (5): 2508–2517. doi:10.1128/jvi.02319-12. PMC 3571372. PMID 23255786. Wikidata Q36607050.
- M A Ozbun; C Meyers (1997). "Characterization of late gene transcripts expressed during vegetative replication of human papillomavirus type 31b". Journal of Virology. 71 (7): 5161–5172. PMC 191751. PMID 9188583. Wikidata Q35888022.

== Honors & Awards ==
- William A. Rutala Abstract Award - APIC (2021).
- Elected as a Fellow, American Academy of Microbiology (2022)

== Personal life ==
Ozbun is lesbian. She is a member of 500 Queer Scientists.
