= Rick Stephenson =

American bodybuilder and US Army Ranger

- Professional bodybuilder

Personal info
- Full name: Richard W. Stephenson
- Born: 1955/1956; Yuba City, California, USA

Best statistics

Professional (Pro) career
- Best win: NPC California Championships; 1988

External image
- Rick Stephenson in the late 1980s.

Richard W. "Rick" Stephenson (born 1955 or 1956 in Yuba City) is an American bodybuilder and former United States Army Ranger.

== Biography ==
He was involved sports since his youngest years and was a high school wrestler. He started to work out as a 14-year-old. After high school he enlisted to the military and was promptly sent to West Germany. In 1979, he was accepted to the San Diego Mesa College, where he majored in aviation occupations.

He never finished college but in the meantime was selected for the United States Army Rangers—a special operations unit of the United States Armed Forces. He graduated from the Fort Benning military school for special forces soldiers, and considers years of torturous trainings at the camp the most rewarding times of his life, admitting: "Your body can stand ten times more than you think it can."

Stephenson's bodybuilding debut was the Gold's Classic in Los Angeles, organized by the National Physique Committee (NPC), where he placed second in the light-heavyweight category.

Stephenson was featured on the front page of Muscular Development in May 1989.

He is 5 feet 8 inches (1.73 m) tall and had a competition weight of 210 pounds (95 kg). He lives in San Diego, California, with his Swedish-born wife Agnetha Stephenson, née Roca, whom he married in the 1980s. He has five sons: Erik, Niklas, Mattius, Alek, and Derrik. Erik (b. 1992) is a soccer player and Niklas is a professional baseball player. Stephenson is a co-founder of the TG Gym San Diego.

== Bodybuilding titles ==
- 1981: Gold's Classic – NPC, Light-HeavyWeight, 2nd
- 1981: Nationals – NPC, Light-HeavyWeight, 11th
- 1985: USA Championships – NPC, Light-HeavyWeight, 4th
- 1987: California Championships – NPC, 2nd
- 1988: California Championships – NPC, HeavyWeight, 1st
- 1988: California Championships – NPC, Overall Winner
- 1989: USA Championships – NPC, HeavyWeight, 3rd
- 1990: Nationals – NPC, HeavyWeight, 4th
