= San Diego Mesa College =

Community college in San Diego, California, US

Coordinates: 32°48′16″N 117°10′13″W

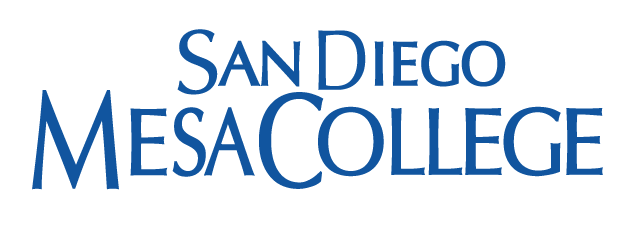
- Type: Public community college
- Established: 1964
- Parent institution: California Community Colleges and the San Diego Community College District
- President: Ashanti T. Hands
- Faculty: 756
- Administrative staff: 264
- Undergraduates: 29,045 (2022–2023)
- Location: San Diego, California, United States
- Campus: Suburban, 104 acres (42 ha)
- Colors: Navy Blue, White and Gold
- Sporting affiliations: Pacific Coast Athletic Conference Southern California Football Association
- Mascot: Olympians
- Website: www.sdmesa.edu
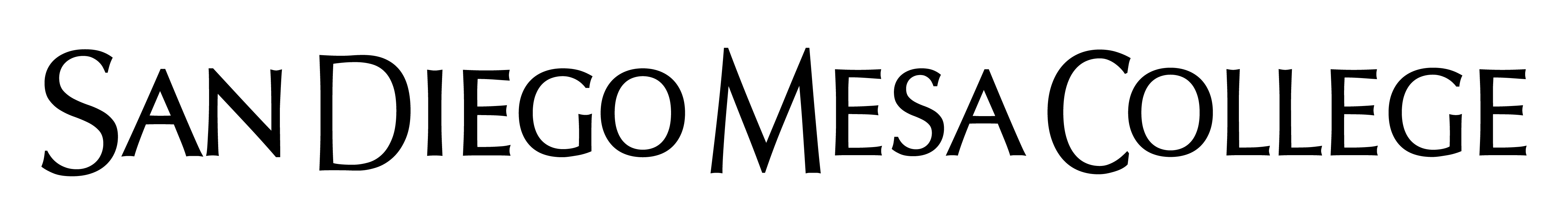

San Diego Mesa College (Mesa College or Mesa) is a public community college in San Diego, California. It is part of San Diego Community College District and the California Community Colleges system. The college is accredited by the Accrediting Commission for Community and Junior Colleges (ACCJC).

The campus was officially opened in January 1964. It has since grown into one of the largest community colleges in the City of San Diego and the 11th largest community college in California. In 2016, Mesa College became one of the first 15 California community colleges to offer bachelor's degrees.

== History ==
Community college education in San Diego began in 1914 when the Board of Education of the San Diego City Schools authorized post-secondary classes for San Diego high school students. In 1956, San Diego voters authorized the first of two bonds to establish and construct what would become San Diego Mesa College on an 85-acre mesa next to Stephen Watts Kearny High School. Classes began in 1963 with four faculty members serving 35 students at the 900 building at Kearny High while construction on the college’s campus was completed.

== Administration ==
The college is administered by the San Diego Community College District. Mesa is accredited by the Accrediting Commission for Community and Junior Colleges.

== Academics ==
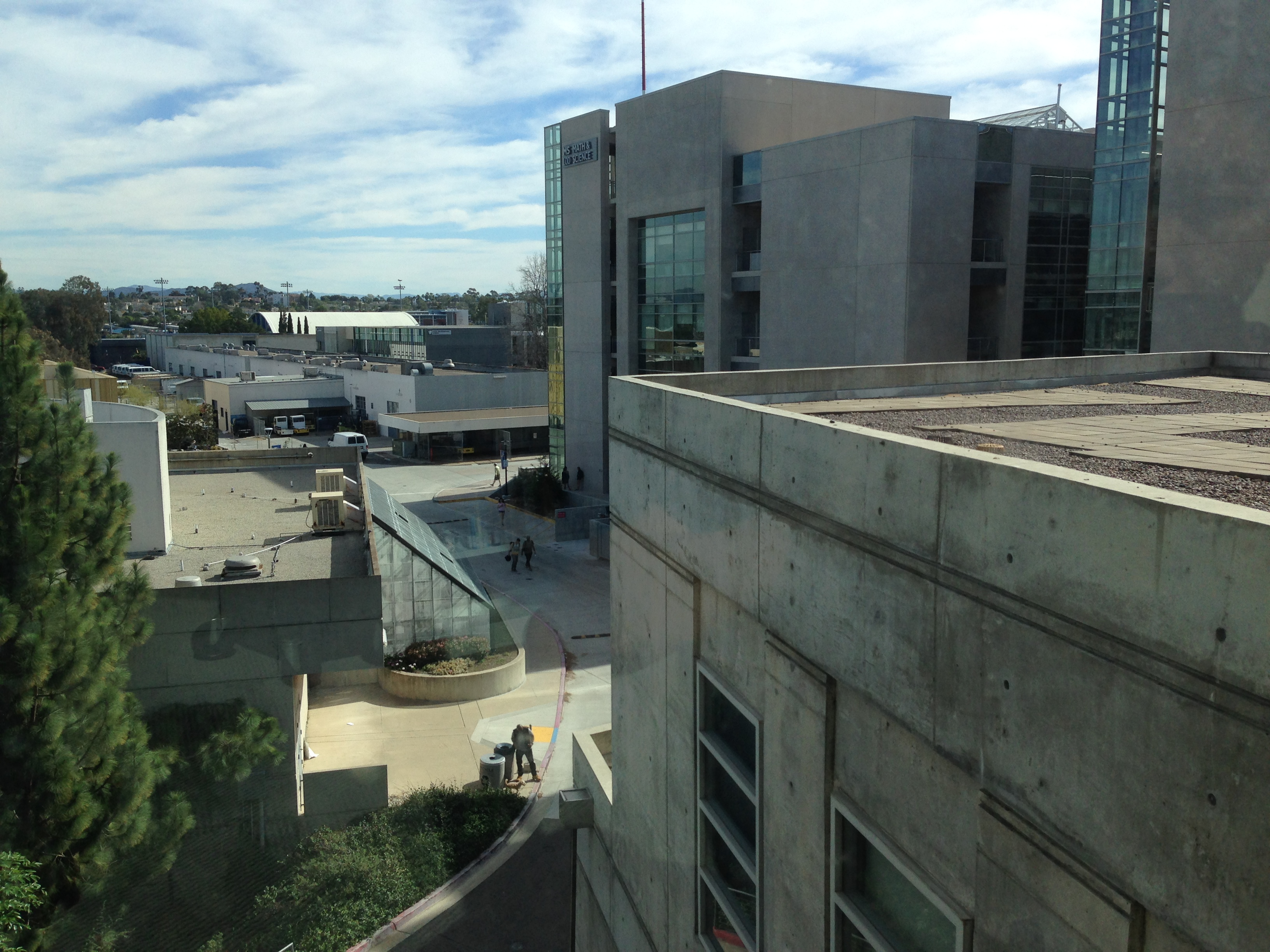
San Diego Mesa College Math and Science building

Courses are provided in general education, lower-division transfer programs, occupational and developmental education.

As of February 2024, Mesa College offered almost 200 associate degree and certificate programs.

In 2016, Mesa was one of the first California Community Colleges to be approved to offer a bachelor’s degree program. The first class with a Bachelor of Science in Health Information Management graduated in spring 2018. 22 students graduated with a B.S. from the Health Information Management Program in Spring 2023. In October 2023, Mesa was approved to offer an additional bachelor’s program in the Physical Therapist Assistant Program.

=== Transfers ===
San Diego Mesa college offers Transfer Admission Guarantee programs that provide pathways to San Diego State University and the University of California, San Diego. Additionally, the college offers associate degree for transfer programs in many departments. Mesa also staffs a Transfer Center in its Student Support department, providing dedicated counseling and resources.

=== Mesa College Foundation ===
The Mesa College Foundation offers scholarships to Mesa students. In 2023, it awarded $159,566 in scholarships across 118 opportunities to 168 student recipients.

== Campus ==
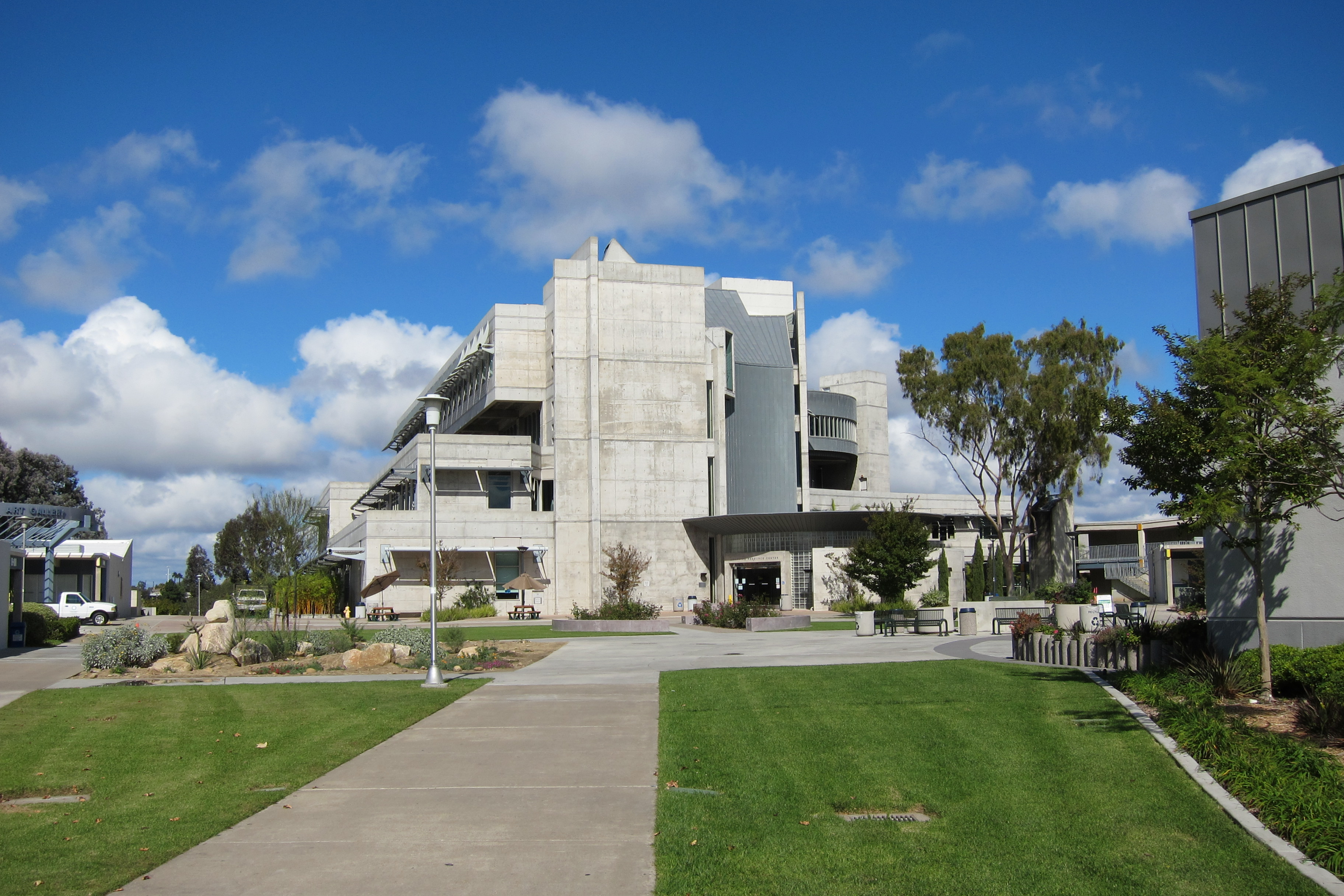
South facade of the Learning Resource Center.

San Diego Mesa College is located in the Clairemont Mesa neighborhood of central San Diego. The campus is bordered by the Tecolote Nature Preserve, Kearny Mesa, and residential neighborhoods. It is home to over 20 instructional buildings and athletic facilities and fields, the Learning Resource Center (LRC), Library, and Mesa Commons. Mesa Commons houses a multi-cuisine cafeteria and student-run restaurant, 72Fifty.

Campus landscaping features native species and an environmental learning garden. There is also a geo-garden located in the courtyard of the Math + Science Complex. In addition, the Mesa Woodland Nature and Interpretive Trail is the largest display of labeled native plants in San Diego county, with 41 native species, including four endangered plants: the San Diego Barrel Cactus, Chalk Dudleya. Willowy Mint, and Torrey Pine.

Art facilities include the Gracia Molina de Pick Glass Gallery, the World Art Collection Gallery, and the Mesa College Art Gallery.

Mesa College is serviced at the Rosa Parks transit center by MTS route 44 at the eastern edge of campus. The station’s name honors Rosa Parks, the groundbreaking civil rights leader who made three trips to Mesa in the 1990s.

== Student life ==
The student body government is the Associated Students (AS), organized into an executive council and senate. In addition, over 30 student clubs are represented by the Interclub Council (ICC).

There are also multiple on-campus community centers; the Dreamer Resource Center, FAST Center, Veterans Success Center, Transfer Center, Career Center, Avanza Engagement Center, and Pride Center.

The college newspaper, The Mesa Press, is run by journalism students and covers Mesa-related news. It has published since 1966.

== Athletics ==
Men's sports	Women's sports
Baseball	Badminton
Basketball	Basketball
Cross country	Beach volleyball
Football	Cross country
Soccer	Soccer
Swimming and diving	Softball
Track and field	Swimming and diving
Volleyball	Track and field
Water polo	Volleyball
	Water polo

The athletics facilities are at the campus's eastern edge. The Merrill Douglas Stadium (named after the first athletic director at the college) provides a venue for the Olympians Football team, Men’s and Women’s Soccer, and Men’s and Women's Track and Field. Additional facilities include a baseball field, softball fields, gymnasium, swimming pool, tennis courts, upper field and beach volleyball courts. In 2016, the 27,000-square-foot Exercise Science building opened. It is home to the School of Exercise Science, Health Education, Dance and Athletics programs.

San Diego Mesa College offers 19 competitive teams across men’s and women’s sports. On average, 220 student-athletes participate in the program. All student athletes must enroll in at least 12 units per semester and maintain at least a 2.0 GPA. The college mascot is the Olympians. The school has competed in the Pacific Coast Athletic Conference (PCAC) since 1982 in every sport except for football where they have competed under the Central League in the Southern California Football Association.

As of 2023, Mesa athletes competed in the California Community College Athletic Association State Championships in 7 sports. The Women’s Volleyball team and Women’s Badminton team are ranked 1st in the state. Men’s Track and Field are 2nd, and Women’s Track and Field are 3rd, with an additional four and two individual state champions from the teams, respectively. In Men’s Volleyball, they ranked 4th in the state. Two Women’s Beach Volleyball teams and the Softball team qualified for their state championships, and the Women’s Swimming and Diving team ranked 1st in their conference.

The program has also been awarded the Pacific Coast Athletics Conference's highest honor, the Chet DeVore Trophy, four times. The DeVore award is presented annually to the PCAC member college with the most successful men’s and women’s intercollegiate athletic program for the academic year. Mesa College won the honor in 2011–2012, 2018–2019, 2021–2022, and 2022–2023.

== Notable alumni ==
- Tony Banks, professional football player
- Anthony J. Battaglia, judge
- John Beam, college former football coach
- Annette Bening, actress
- Darren Comeaux, professional football player
- Sam Daghles, professional basketball coach and player
- Roger Guy English, businessman and disc jockey
- Billy Eppler, professional baseball manager
- Monique Henderson, Olympic athlete
- Mireille Kamariza, bioscientist
- Jonny Kim, sailor, physician, and astronaut
- Matt Kofler, professional football player and coach
- Shlomo Lipetz, professional baseball player and businessman
- Mike Martz, college and professional football coach
- Lou Niles, radio host
- Michelle Ozbun, virologist and professor
- Brittney Reese, Olympic athlete and college track and field coach
- Arnie Robinson, Olympic athlete and college track and field coach
- Felix Sanchez, Olympic athlete
- Rick Stephenson, bodybuilder
- Snow Tha Product, rapper
