= San Diego City College =

Community college in San Diego, California, US

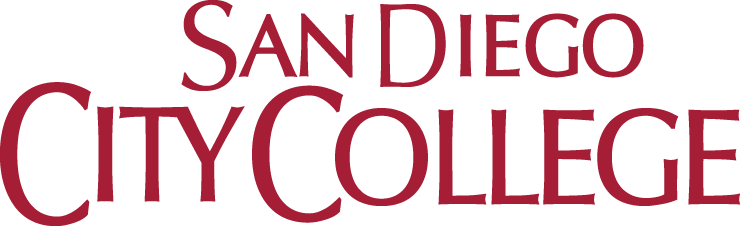
- Type: Public community college
- Established: 1914
- Parent institution: California Community Colleges System
- Budget: US$102,469,454
- Chancellor: Gregory Smith
- President: Ricky Shabazz
- Faculty: 663
- Administrative staff: 543
- Students: 16,852 (spring 2016)
- Location: San Diego, California, United States; 32.7178°N 117.1514°W
- Campus: Urban, 60 acres (24 ha)
- Colors: Red, White and Gold
- Mascot: Knights
- Website: www.sdcity.edu

San Diego City College (City College or City) is a public community college in San Diego, California. It is part of San Diego Community College District and the California Community Colleges system. The college is accredited by the Accrediting Commission for Community and Junior Colleges (ACCJC).

The 60-acre (24 ha) campus consists of 40 buildings in downtown San Diego, adjacent to Balboa Park, Interstate 5 and San Diego High School. Courses are provided in general education, lower-division transfer programs, and occupational and developmental education.

== History ==
Community college education has its roots directly linked to San Diego City College when in 1914, the Board of Education of the San Diego City Schools authorized postsecondary classes for the youth of San Diego. Classes then opened that fall at San Diego High School with four faculty members and 35 students, establishing San Diego City College as the third community college in California.

In 1921, City College moved from the high school to share facilities with San Diego State Teachers College (now known as San Diego State University). For 25 years, the Junior College program remained at San Diego State University. During this period, in 1938, the San Diego Vocational Junior College was established to offer training in technical-vocational skills to post high school students. The following year, the San Diego Evening Junior College was set up to provide college classes in the evening for adults who were unable to attend classes during the day.

City Times, the student newspaper, was founded in 1945 as The Jay Sees and later renamed Fortknightly as a bi-weekly publication. The paper was to become City Times in 1978. The journalism program also published a yearbook through the 1950s called Legend.

By 1946, City College moved back to San Diego High School and reorganized into three branches: San Diego Vocational High School, San Diego College Arts and Sciences, and San Diego Evening Junior College. City College took its permanent campus and during the 1950s and 60s, land was acquired to allow expansion through various blocks of today's northeast downtown San Diego. Additional property was added to the campus in the 1970s.

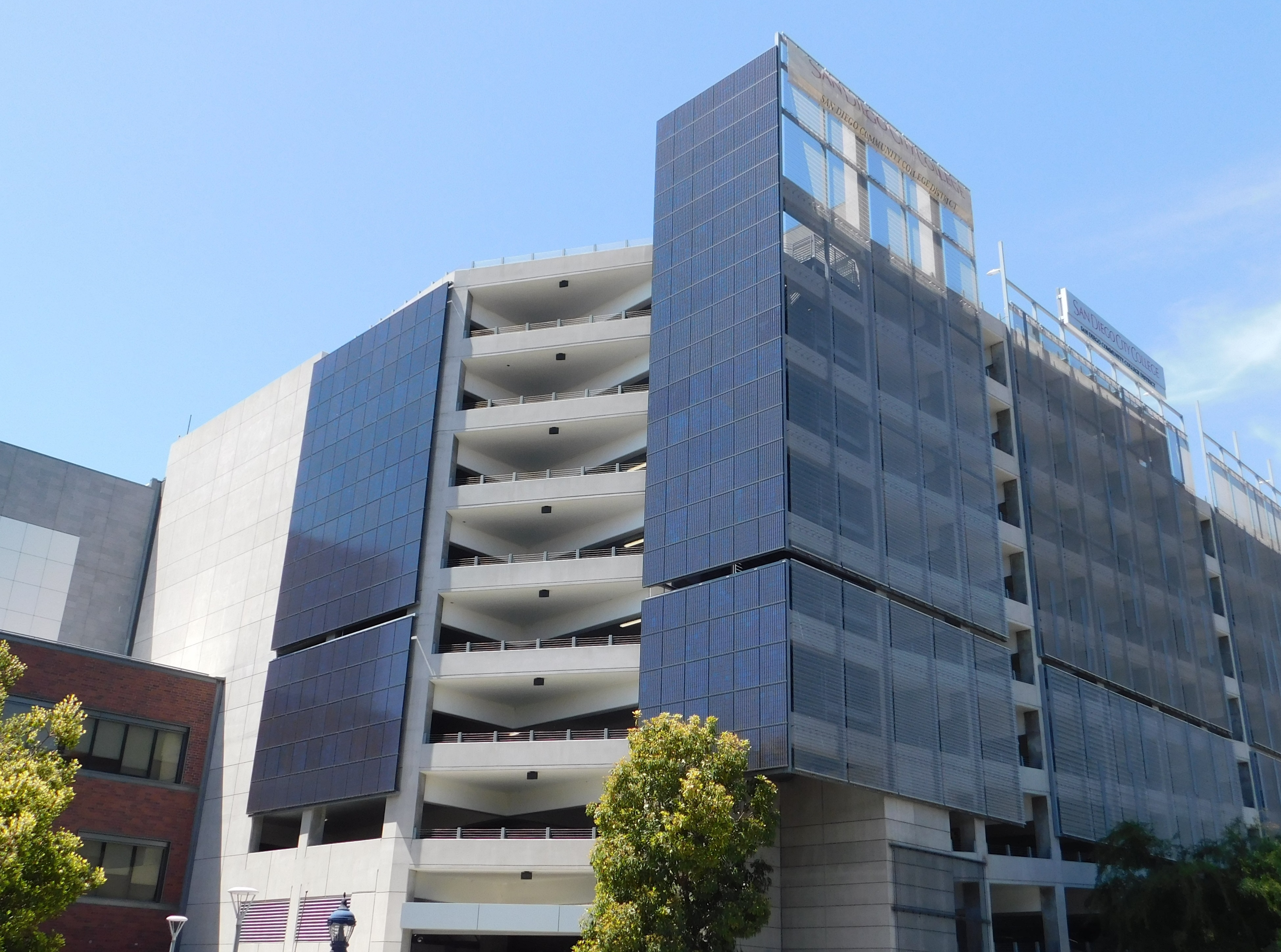
Career Technology Center building at San Diego City College

The campus has received extensive expansion and renovations in the last 20 years starting with the opening of a 3,000-square-foot (280 m^{2}) Fitness Center in 1992. The Educational Technology Center opened in 2000 along with the Learning Resource Center (LRC) in 2002. This happened at the same time SDCC changed its placement test from APS to COMPASS. The Harry West Gymnasium opened in 2005, the Academic Success Center in 2009, and Career Technology Center was inaugurated in late 2010.

The latest projects are being funded by the bond measure, Propositions S and N, passed in 2002 and 2006, of $1,979 billion with monies dispersed throughout the District. Further construction and renovations are taking place and will continue through 2014 at City College, including the construction of new Arts and Humanities, Math and Science and Engineering Technology buildings.

== Governance ==
San Diego City College is governed through a "shared governance" process where the college is headed by a president who acts as chief executive officer and is responsible for carrying out districtwide policies as directed by the district's chancellor, as approved by the district's board of trustees.

Within the college, shared governance activities involve faculty, students and staff in the development of solutions to key policy and college-related issues. The different governing bodies in the governance process assist in the communication of the nature and the necessities of college projects throughout the college community. The college's institutional governance is structured to promote a process of independent and critical thinking based on observation, questioning and research protocols. This governance process is participatory, meaning that all vested interest groups or individuals have the opportunity to voice opinions and in turn achieve decisions formulated based on the creativity of participating groups.

The governing body makes recommendations, through the college's president, to the district's chancellor and the board of trustees.

=== Administration ===
San Diego City College has four major governing components: the Executive Administration, an Academic Senate, an Associated Students Government, and a Classified Senate. The college's administration is then represented in institutional governance through membership on the College Council, leadership of the schools, and representation on the president's cabinet and other participatory governance committees. Governing bodies work together to carry out the responsibilities that fall within the college administration, including provision of educational programs, student support services, staff development, direct campus operations, and various ancillary functions.

All administrative departments and operations are under the final authority of the President, who reports to the Chancellor. The Board of Trustees is the final level of authority for all functions outside the college and within the District.

==== President ====
The president serves as City College's chief executive officer and is responsible for carrying out policies as directed by the district's higher authority. The president also serves as the leader for the college and is also responsible for the day-to-day operations at the college and approving and carrying out college-wide policies as reached with the aid of college's governing bodies.

== Academics ==
The college offers 250 majors and certificate programs and 1,500 classes each semester to more than 17,000 students.

== Campus safety and security ==
While the campus is a relatively safe campus for students to study at, security on campus was called into question when a student was murdered on campus in October 2010. The campus murder prompted administrators to re-evaluate campus security planning, which looked at adequacy of lighting, the availability of panic buttons, and other security measures.

== Notable alumni ==
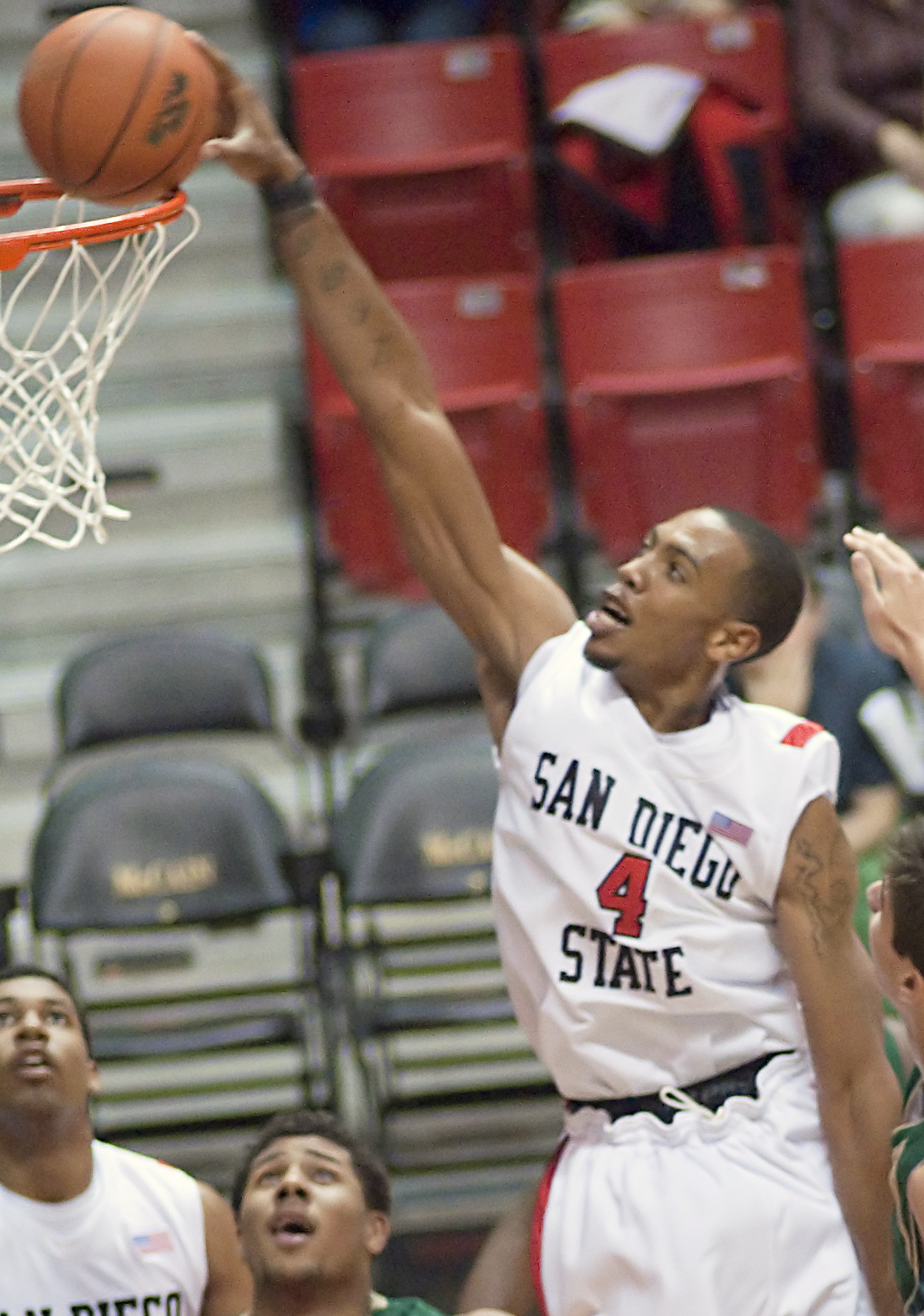
Malcolm Thomas

- Pete Adams – professional football player
- Nick Anderson - musician
- Ed Buchanan - professional football player
- Liz Carmouche - professional mixed martial artist
- Cameron Crowe – film director
- Bill Frank – professional football player
- William Gay – professional football player
- Dave Grayson – professional football player
- Cleavon Little – actor
- Bob Mendoza – professional baseball player and coach
- Sergio Mitre – professional baseball player and convicted child rapist and murderer
- Lou Niles – radio host and film festival executive director
- James Sinegal – Costco Chief Executive Officer
- Malcolm Thomas – professional basketball player
- Eddie Vedder – musician
