= Palomar College =

Community college in San Diego County, California, US

Coordinates: 33.1494°N 117.1848°W

- Motto in English: Learning for Success
- Type: Public community college
- Established: September 23, 1946; 80 years ago
- President: Tina Recalde (interim)
- Location: San Marcos, California, United States
- Campus: Multiple sites
- Colors: Scarlet and silver
- Mascot: Comets
- Website: www.palomar.edu

Palomar College is a public community college in San Diego County, California. The main campus is in San Marcos and three centers and four education sites are located elsewhere throughout north San Diego County.

== History ==
Palomar College opened its doors on September 23, 1946, on the Vista High School campus with nine faculty members and exactly 100 students enrolled.

Palomar College moved from Vista to its current main campus in San Marcos in September 1950.

By 1989, the college's enrollment was around 24,000 students, and it operated seven satellite centers throughout North San Diego County.

In November 2006, voters approved Proposition M, a $694 million bond measure to fund campus improvements and expansion. The measure supported the development of additional education centers in Rancho Bernardo and Fallbrook, both of which opened in June 2018.

Today, Palomar College has a 200-plus-acre main campus and is the largest single community college district in San Diego County. According to Palomar College About Page, 29,000 students currently attend Palomar college, split between the main campus in San Marcos, the three education centers in Escondido, Fallbrook, and Rancho Bernardo, and several other additional education sites all within San Diego County.

In 2019, Palomar College faced criticism over plans to construct a presidential office suite on the top floor of its newly built Library/Learning Resource Center. The project was funded through Measure M, a $694 million bond measure approved by voters in 2006 for college construction and facility improvements. Several faculty members and two members of the five-member governing board questioned the expense and the level of oversight surrounding the project. A Palomar professor filed a lawsuit against the Palomar Community College District under the California Public Records Act, seeking records related to the presidential suite and the installation of its restroom.

Later that same year, a review by the Fiscal Crisis and Management Assistance Team (FCMAT) found that the Palomar Community College District had an estimated structural deficit of $11.75 million for the 2019–20 fiscal year. The report also found that 96.2 percent of the district's ongoing unrestricted revenue was being spent on salaries and benefits, leaving the district with little flexibility to address its deficit. State officials warned that Palomar could run out of reserves within two years and might need to borrow about $6.5 million to remain financially stable.

Concerns about Blake's leadership were also growing among faculty. In October 2019, faculty voted "no confidence" in Blake. Two months later, the college's governing board placed Blake on paid administrative leave while an investigation was pending. They reached a separation agreement in February 2020 and Blake resigned in exchange for over $600,000.

In March 2020, the California Community Colleges Chancellor's Office assigned a fiscal monitor to Palomar to oversee the district's financial recovery. At the time, Palomar was one of only two community college districts in the state under this type of monitoring. The monitor was brought in to review the district's finances and its efforts to address the problems identified by FCMAT.

In July 2022, Moody's Investors Service affirmed Palomar's Aa2 bond rating and revised its outlook from negative to stable, citing improvements in the district's fiscal management and policies. In January 2024, the Accrediting Commission for Community and Junior Colleges determined that Palomar had corrected deficiencies identified during its 2022 evaluation and reaffirmed the college's accreditation for the remainder of its accreditation cycle.

In April 2025, the Palomar Community College District Governing Board voted 3–2 to discontinue the practice of reading the college's Indigenous Land acknowledgement at board meetings. Trustees Jacqueline Kaiser, Yvette Acosta, and Holly Hamilton-Bleakley voted to end the practice, while Roberto Rodriguez and Judy Patacsil voted to retain it.

In October 2025, the board repealed Board Policy 3000, an anti-racism policy adopted in 2021. The five elected trustees voted along the same 3–2 division, with Kaiser, Acosta, and Hamilton-Bleakley supporting the repeal and Rodriguez and Patacsil opposing it.

The trustees had received support from differing political and labor organizations in their respective elections. Jacqueline Kaiser was listed in a 2022 voter guide published by The RMNNT, while Yvette Acosta and Holly Hamilton-Bleakley were listed in the organization's 2024 general-election guide. The RMNNT has been described as a San Diego conservative political organization focused on voter education and candidate training. Judy Patacsil received endorsements during her 2022 campaign from Democratic clubs and organized labor, including the Poway Democratic Club and AFT Guild, while Roberto Rodriguez was endorsed for his 2024 reelection by the Palomar Faculty Federation and AFT Guild.

In December 2025, the Palomar Faculty Federation issued a resolution of no confidence in Kaiser, Acosta, and Hamilton-Bleakley, while the Council of Classified Employees issued a separate resolution of no confidence in Kaiser and Acosta.

The last permanent president was Star Rivera-Lacey who departed in November 2025. Palomar College is currently led by interim president Tina Recalde. Recalde led a cross-campus team that developed Palomar's first bachelor's degree program, focused on building performance and environmental design.

== Landmarks ==
=== "P" Mountain ===
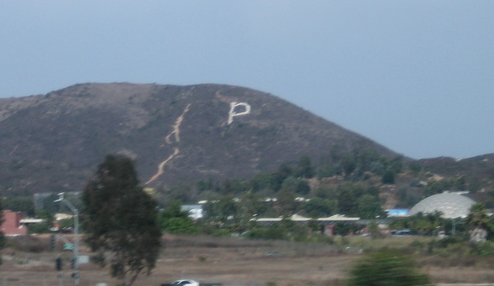
The "P" landmark on the hillside overlooking the Palomar College campus.

A prominent landmark of the San Marcos campus is a large white letter "P" located on the hillside above the college, which remains visible from miles away.

The monument was built in the fall of 1950 by a volunteer group of students led by alumnus Bill Tipton. The students hiked up the hillside carrying shovels, hoes, and pickaxes to clear the terrain and assemble the letter using white-painted rocks. They successfully completed the project despite the area being heavily infested with rattlesnakes at the time.

In May 2001, the Palomar College Governing Board accepted a permanent trail easement to the landmark, securing the college's legal right to maintain the letter in perpetuity amidst nearby residential land development.

== Campuses and education sites ==
Palomar College has its main campus in San Marcos and education centers in Escondido, Fallbrook, and Rancho Bernardo.

Palomar College also has education sites at Camp Pendleton, the Ramona Community Campus, Ramona High School, and a Public Safety Training Center in San Marcos.

=== Camp Pendleton ===
Palomar College has a site on Marine Corps Base Camp Pendleton, offering courses to active-duty service members, veterans, military spouses, and other students on base.

Palomar also hosts free hands-on assistance on the first and third Tuesdays of each month at the School of Infantry Base Education Center. Services include applying for college, registering for classes, help with Tuition Assistance and FAFSA applications, and other student support services.

== Academics ==
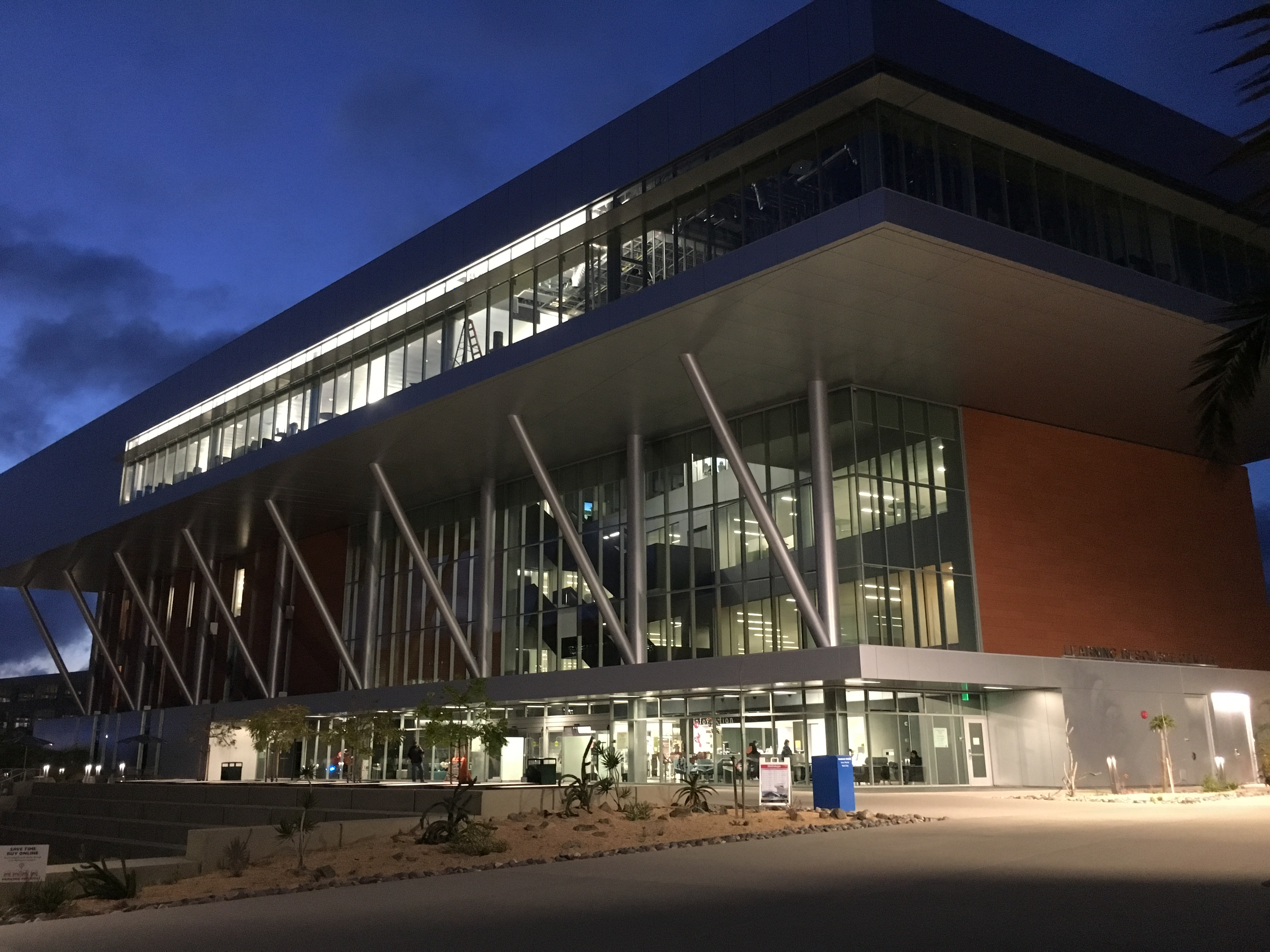
Palomar College library

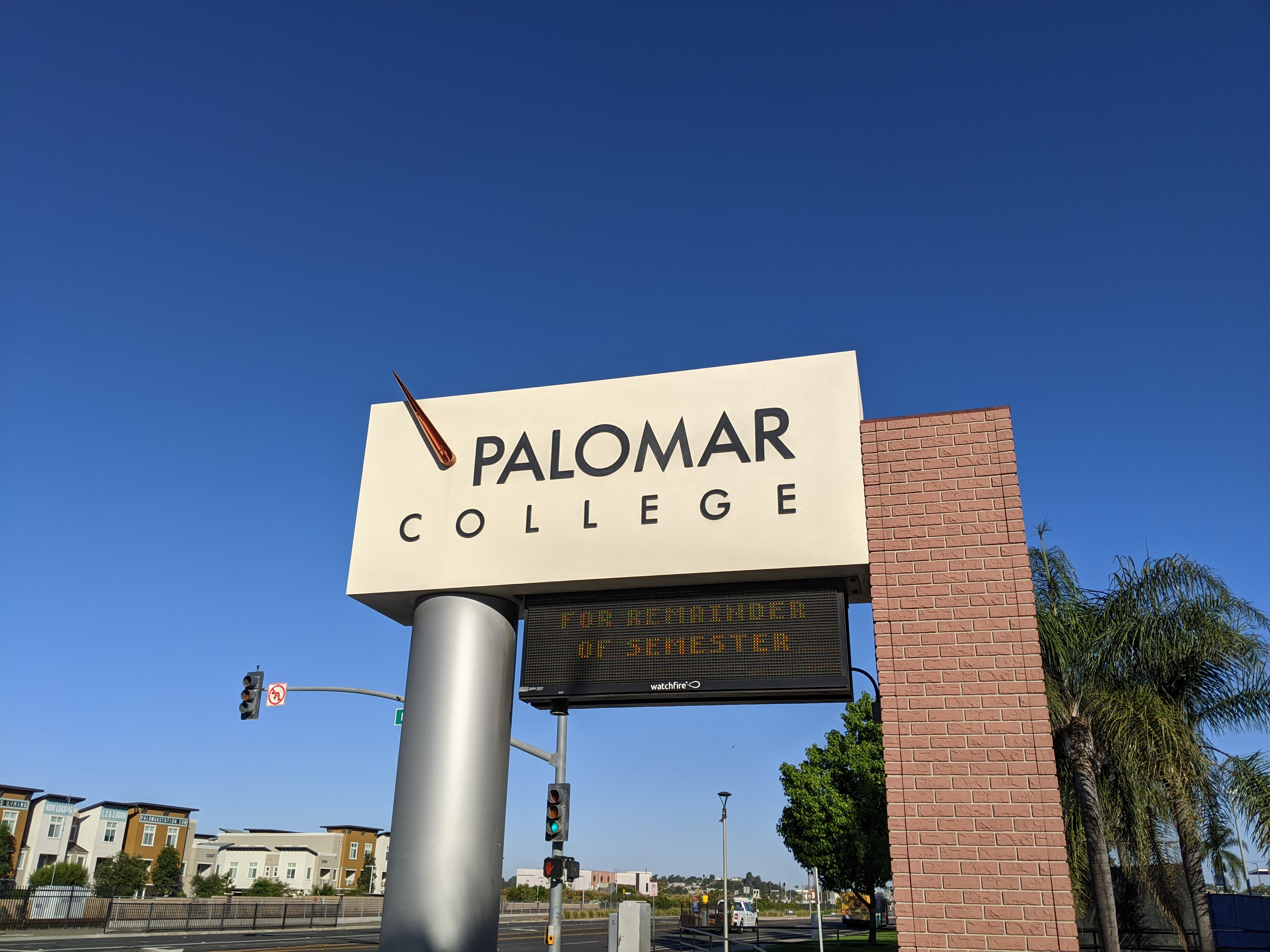
Palomar College sign

Palomar College offers 250 associate degree and certificate programs as well as programs for students wishing to transfer to many different four-year universities, including institutions in the University of California and California State University systems. Palomar College currently offers 31 Associate Degree for Transfer programs.

These programs are organized into five academic divisions:

- Arts, Media, Business Administration
- Career, Technical and Extended Education
- Languages and Literature
- Mathematics and The Natural and Health Sciences
- Social and Behavioral Sciences

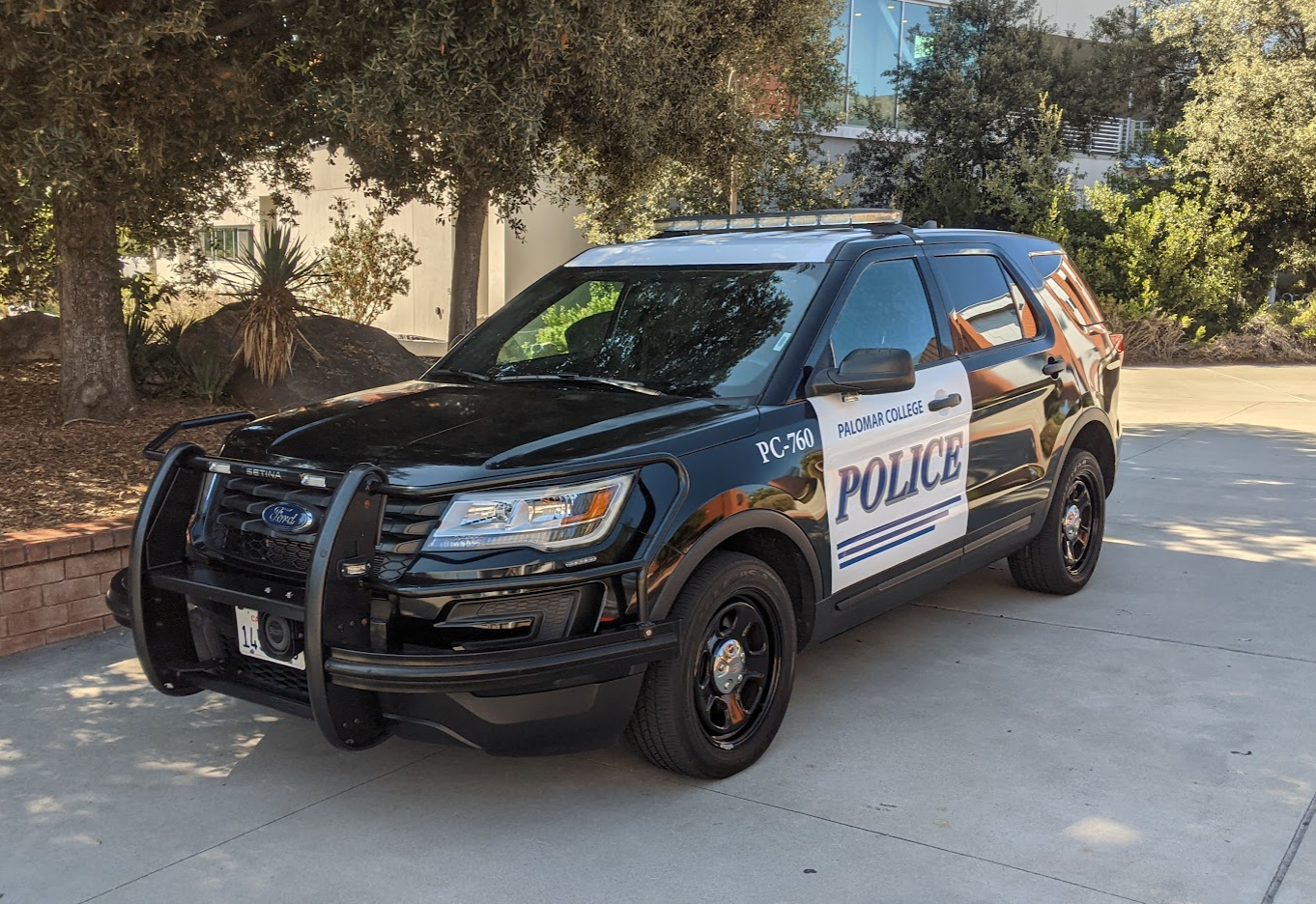
A Palomar College Ford Police Interceptor Utility car parked outside of the cafeteria

In addition, Palomar College and other local adult schools in North County work collaboratively and sometimes separately to leverage services and resources to better serve adult education students in the areas of Adult Basic Education, ESL, GED, HISET, high school diploma, and post-secondary education and vocational training.

Palomar College is the lead member of the Education to Career Network of North San Diego County. The Education to Career Network (ETCN) is an adult education association in North San Diego County that provides free or low-cost training, certification programs, and academic courses to help adults transition to higher education or enter the workforce. ETCN is one of 71 consortia in the state of California and is funded by the California Adult Education Program. Members of the ETCN consortium are Escondido Adult School, Palomar College, Poway Adult School, Ramona Adult School, San Marcos Adult School, and Vista Adult School.

In fall 2026, Palomar College began offering its first bachelor's degree, a Bachelor of Science in Building Performance and Environmental Design. The fall 2026 semester marked the first time that Palomar College offered a baccalaureate degree, with 24 students in the first group. The program costs students roughly $15,000 for the two-year upper-division portion of the degree.

=== Basic Police Academy ===
Palomar College offers a Basic Police Academy. In 2018, the program was recognized as a California Community Colleges Strong Workforce Gold Star program. One hundred percent of students were employed in a job similar to their field of study, 88 percent earned the regional living wage, and students had a 54 percent increase in earnings.

The academy operates as an extended-format training program designed to allow recruits to complete police academy training while maintaining full-time employment. The full program is presented over approximately 12 months and consists of 1,000 hours of training. The Basic Police Academy program is certified by the California Commission on Peace Officer Standards and Training (POST).

The academy was redesigned in 2016 as a modular training program. Its curriculum is divided into Module III, Module II, and Module I, which are completed in descending order. Completion of Module III meets the training requirements for appointment as a Level III reserve peace officer; completion of Modules III and II meets the requirements for appointment as a Level II reserve peace officer; and completion of all three modules meets the academy training requirements for appointment as a Level I reserve peace officer or employment as a full-time sworn peace officer in California.

Recruits who complete the full academy receive 38 college credits. The units may be applied toward an associate degree in Administration of Justice, and students who complete all three modules are eligible to apply for the Basic Police Academy Certificate of Achievement. Classes are generally held on Tuesday, Wednesday, and Thursday evenings and on Saturdays, with some additional weekend training scheduled as required.

Unlike the intensive full-time format used by the San Diego Regional Public Safety Training Institute at Miramar College, Palomar's academy uses a format conducted primarily during evenings and weekends.

== Student Resources ==
Palomar College offers basic needs support, including free groceries and community housing resources, primarily centered at the Palomar College Basic Needs office on the San Marcos campus.

For housing, students can get resources from the Student Life and Leadership Quick Guide, which connects students with local housing agencies.

For grocery resources, students can use the Food and Nutrition Center, which provides enrolled students with free groceries and other essential resources. CalFresh support is also available. Staff can help students determine their eligibility, assist with their application, answer questions about required documents, and provide guidance throughout the application process.

=== Dreamer Success Program ===
Palomar College offers eligible undocumented and mixed-status students support through its Dreamer Success Program. According to Palomar College, the Dreamer Success Program "supports eligible undocumented and mixed-status students by helping them navigate college, strengthen academic skills, and access resources across Palomar College."

Through the Dreamer Success Program, undocumented or mixed-status students can find resources to help them pursue an education. Palomar College has also worked with community partners such as the North County Higher Education Alliance, the CSU San Marcos Dreamer Resource Office, and MiraCosta College's Undocumented People Rise Up in Solidarity and Empowerment program.

=== Pride Center ===
Palomar College operates a Pride Center on its San Marcos campus that provides space, educational programming, and support services for LGBTQ+ students and allies. The center promotes student leadership, academic and professional equity, and access to resources related to sexual orientation and gender identity.

The Pride Center opened in January 2011. Discussions about establishing the center began in 2009 following incidents involving anti-LGBTQ+ harassment on campus.

In 2026, Palomar expanded the Pride Center into a larger space in the Student Union. The expanded center includes academic counseling and behavioral-health counseling services. Palomar reported that nearly 20 percent of students identified as LGBTQ+ in a campus survey conducted prior to the expansion.

The center identifies inclusiveness, attentiveness, vibrancy, supportiveness, resourcefulness, and boldness as its six guiding values.

=== Cooperative Agencies Resources for Education ===
Cooperative Agencies Resources for Education (C.A.R.E.) is a state-funded program with the combined efforts of Palomar Community College, the Welfare Department, and the Employment Development Department. Its purpose is to provide educational opportunities and job experience for persons currently receiving TANF/CalWORKS who have been denied access to postsecondary education, provide necessary support for their academic success and retention, assist them in their pursuit of career and vocational goals, and help them move off welfare. C.A.R.E. has been ongoing at Palomar College since 1984.

=== Vista Detention Facility ===
Palomar College has a partnership with the Vista Detention Facility. In 2018, Palomar began offering college courses for credit to people incarcerated there. This gives them the opportunity to earn college credits while serving their sentence and continue their education once they are released.

=== Palomar Promise ===
Palomar College offers the Palomar Promise, a program for eligible first-time college students that provides up to two years of free tuition, assistance with purchasing textbooks, and access to academic and career planning and other support services.

For the 2026–27 academic year, Palomar College expanded the program from approximately 1,700 students to as many as 3,500. The expansion was supported by a one-time $3.8 million investment of redevelopment agency funds received by the district, in addition to annual state and local funding. In previous years, applications to the program exceeded the amount that available funding could support.

The program was launched in 2017 with more than 800 participating students and grew to approximately 1,500 students by its second year.

Extended Opportunity Programs and Services (EOPS)

Palomar College offers Extended Opportunity Programs and Services (EOPS), a state-funded program that provides academic support and financial assistance to students facing economic, social, or educational disadvantages.

== Campus facilities ==
=== Planetarium ===
The Palomar College Planetarium is currently one of the largest in California and was officially completed in March 2012. There was a planetarium beforehand, but in July 2008 it was demolished to make way for new campus construction. The original planetarium was built in 1965 and served the campus for 43 years. The new planetarium opened its doors to the public on April 20, 2012.

=== Edwin and Frances Hunter Arboretum ===
The Edwin and Frances Hunter Arboretum is located on the San Marcos campus. The arboretum was established in 1973, when five acres were set aside for it. In 2015, the Palomar College Arboretum was renamed the Edwin and Frances Hunter Arboretum.

Palomar College houses nearly 5,000 different plant species across the Edwin and Frances Hunter Arboretum, the Palomar Cactus and Succulent Garden, the main campus, and areas of native coastal sage scrub. The collection includes both native and non-native species, with plants from all major continents represented. The concentration of plant diversity on the campus has been compared with Balboa Park, the San Diego Zoo Safari Park, and the former Quail Botanical Gardens. The adjacent coastal sage scrub also provides habitat for a variety of birds, mammals, reptiles, and invertebrates and is used as a study site for classes in fields including biology, botany, and archaeology.

Along with the Edwin and Frances Hunter Arboretum, the San Marcos campus is accredited as a Level II Arboretum by the ArbNet Arboretum Accreditation Program. It is the only community college in California with the Level II Arboretum designation.

Palomar is keeping a rare variety of the native Hawaiian plant called the ohai alive. Years ago, a Hawaiian botanical garden sent Palomar 25 ohai seeds. The campus successfully grew four plants, eventually producing more than 31,000 new seeds. This particular variety of ohai is now extinct in Hawaii, and Palomar hopes to help reintroduce it to the wild.

The arboretum uses a color-coded system. White signs mean a plant is not endangered, yellow signs mean the plant is vulnerable or threatened, and red signs mean the plant is critically threatened or extinct in the wild. The estate of Edwin and Frances Hunter donated $500,000 to help with the long-term care and maintenance of the arboretum.

== Media ==
The Telescope is a student-run publication, produced by students enrolled in journalism courses and funded entirely through advertising.

Impact is a student-run magazine also produced by students in the college's journalism program. It has been published annually each spring semester since 2011 by the editorial staff of The Telescope.

Focus is a student-run mini magazine produced by students in the college's journalism program. It launched in fall 2025 and is published annually each fall. Its content is available on The Telescope website under the Focus tab.

Bravura is Palomar College's student-produced literary and arts journal, established in 1964 and published annually. In 2024, Bravura was named Best Magazine in the Pacific-Western Division of the Community College Humanities Association's literary magazine competition and placed third nationally. The journal also received First Class recognition in the National Council of Teachers of English's 2024 REALM Awards for student literary magazines.

KKSM is the college's student-run radio station. It is broadcast 24/7 from the Jonathan Downey Memorial Studio. It has a 500-watt AM signal. KKSM AM 1320 is known as San Diego's only independent, freeform radio station, which means the station is free from corporate interests. Its programming and music range from punk to hip hop, heavy metal, blues, news, and sports talk.

Palomar College Television (PCTV) is the college's PBS television station. It has been active since 1975. Palomar College Television has been creating award-winning educational content for more than 50 years and has received 37 Pacific Southwest Emmy Awards. Its documentary films have been shown at more than 60 film festivals and aired on PBS stations across the United States.

Students write, film, edit, and produce programming through Palomar's Radio, Television, and Cinema programs. Student-produced programs include North County News, Prep Sports Live, and Palomar Live.

In July 2026, Palomar College Television's documentary My Wild Life received a Gold Telly Award and an Emmy for Best Documentary from the Pacific Southwest Emmy Awards. The documentary follows wildlife photographer Suzi Eszterhas and her experiences photographing animals in the wild. The film was also approved to be sent to PBS stations around the country and will be used in Palomar's photography degree and certificate programs.

== Associated Student Government ==
The Governing Board of the Palomar Community College District has authorized the students of the District to organize a student body association named "Associated Students of the Palomar Community College District". The association is required by law to "encourage students to participate in the governance of the college".

The governing body of the association is named "Associated Student Government" (ASG). The ASG is a student-run organization at Palomar that strives to create a better campus for its students. Members of the ASG serve on campus-wide shared-governance committees and hiring committees, lobby State and Federal representatives on student issues, attend leadership conferences, and are responsible for Comet Week, Springfest, and some campus-wide activities.

Members of the ASG have opportunities to attend conferences, special on-campus parking, and serve on campus-wide committees as the "voice of the students." The Associated Students periodically participates in meetings sponsored by a statewide community college student organization named Student Senate for California Community Colleges. The statewide Student Senate is authorized by law "to advocate before the Legislature and other state and local governmental entities".

== Athletics ==
The intercollegiate athletic program at Palomar College consists of a combined 17 men's and women's varsity-sport teams, averaging over 400 participating student-athletes per year.

Palomar fields men's teams in baseball, basketball, football, soccer, swimming and diving, water polo, volleyball, and wrestling. Women's sports include basketball, beach volleyball, soccer, softball, swimming and diving, track and field, volleyball, water polo, and wrestling. The Athletics Department also oversees a co-ed cheerleading program.

The Palomar College women's softball team was named the 2022–23 3C2A Scholar Team of the Year. All members of the team excelled both in school and athletically with a total GPA of 3.0 or higher. The Scholar Team Award is the highest academic team achievement given annually by the 3C2A.

The softball team also reached the 3C2A state championship game in 2025 after finishing the season with a 44–5 overall record and a 15–0 conference record. The following season, Palomar won the 2026 3C2A state championship with a 13–0 victory over Saddleback College, finishing the season 45–2. The championship was the sixth state title in the program's history and its first since 2015.

As of January 2025, Palomar's athletic department reported that the women's softball program had won five state championships and 39 conference championships and had produced 57 All-Americans.

In 2025, Palomar College's new football and softball facilities received the bronze award in the Multi-Field Facility category from the American Sports Builders Association. The softball stadium opened in April 2024, while the football stadium opened in August 2024 and became the first on-campus football stadium in Palomar's history. Verde Design served as an athletics design consultant on the project and developed construction drawings for the multi-sport complex, which includes a synthetic-turf football field and stadium as well as a softball field and training facilities. Landscaping for the two facilities added approximately 20 plant species to the district's arboretum and botanic garden collection, with Caribbean-themed plantings around the softball field and Asian-themed plantings around the football field.

== Honor Societies ==
=== Phi Theta Kappa ===
Palomar College is home to the Alpha Omega Rho (ΑΩΡ) Chapter of Phi Theta Kappa (PTK), the official international honor society for two-year colleges. The chapter recognizes and encourages academic achievement among associate degree students. Eligibility for membership requires the completion of at least 12 transferable semester units and a minimum cumulative GPA of 3.5.

Students who meet the criteria are typically invited to join each semester, though eligible students may also apply directly. Active members have opportunities to engage in service, leadership, fellowship, and scholarly activities through campus events, regional conferences.

Benefits of membership include access to exclusive transfer scholarships, leadership development, publication opportunities in Nota Bene—PTK's literary journal—and the honor of wearing Phi Theta Kappa regalia during commencement ceremonies.

== Notable alumni ==
- Todd Bankhead – professional football player
- Joey Beltran – professional mixed martial artist
- Lizet Benrey – painter
- Ken Block – rally car driver and founder of DC Shoes
- Travis Browne – professional mixed martial artist
- Matt Chico – professional baseball player
- Tom Dempsey – professional football player
- Ryan Dahl – software engineer, inventor of Node.js
- Pita Elisara – professional football player
- Lina Fanene – professional wrestler and plus-sized model
- Saalim Hakim – professional football player
- Tim Hill (attended) – professional baseball player
- James Hoyt – professional baseball player
- Nia Jax – professional wrestler for WWE
- Candi Kubeck – captain of ValuJet Flight 592, which crashed into the Florida Everglades on May 11, 1996
- Bobby Lee (attended) – comedian and actor
- Tommy Lister Jr. – actor and professional wrestler
- Tom Luginbill – college football player and analyst for ESPN
- Brett Salisbury – college football player and author
- Robert Stromberg – Oscar-winning art director, production designer, special effects artist, and filmmaker
- Jesse Taylor (attended) – professional mixed martial artist
- Kenbrell Thompkins (attended) – professional football player
- Taylor Tomlinson – stand-up comedian, writer, and television host
- Nick Vincent (born 1986) – professional baseball player

== Notable faculty ==
- Dorian "Doc" Paskowitz (1921–2014), surfer and physician
- Joyce Cutler–Shaw (1932–2018), multidisciplinary artist; taught from 1974 to 1978.
