= Suzana Norberg =

American actress

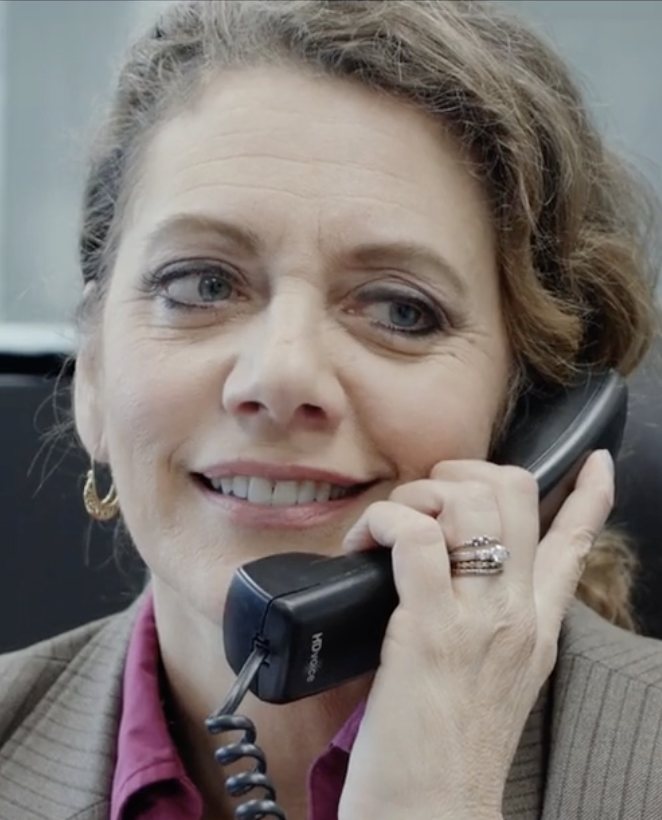
- Norberg in Poverty of Will (2019)
- Born: Milwaukee, Wisconsin, U.S.
- Other names: Sue Wakefield
- Occupations: Actress; voice actress; screenwriter; film producer; copywriter
- Years active: 1999–present
- Known for: Libertyville
- Notable credits: The $5 Movie; Adalynn; Danger Girl; Debunkers, Inc.; We All Die Alone
- Television: Law & Order: Special Victims Unit
- Awards: 2022 Best Supporting Actress at Oceanside International Film Festival for We All Die Alone
- Website: suzananorberg.com

Suzana Norberg, also known as Sue Wakefield, is an American actress, voice actress, and screenwriter who contributed her voice to the video games Evil Zone (1999), Danger Girl (2000), created the film Libertyville (2021), and appeared in the films and Debunkers, Inc. (2019) and Adalynn (2023). She won Best Supporting Actress at Oceanside International Film Festival for We All Die Alone (2021).

== Personal life ==
Norberg grew up in Milwaukee, Wisconsin. She was inspired to act after watching The Carol Burnett Show.

== Career ==
In 1987, Norberg became a copywriter in San Diego for Arnold Buck Inc. In 1997, she worked in the Quality category for marketing at The San Diego Union-Tribune.

In 2017, Norberg's memoir Too Lazy to be Satan was a finalist at the San Diego Book Awards Association. She created the film Libertyville after she lost her job in 2019.

Norberg took up acting full time during the COVID-19 pandemic, guest starring on Law & Order: Special Victims Unit and was cast in the films Adalynn and We All Die Alone.

=== Short films ===
Norberg's film Libertyville premiered at Dances with Films and Film Threat scored it 8 out of 10. Norberg portrays her grandmother in the film which was shot in San Diego. Norberg was interviewed by KGTV for her nominations at the San Diego Film Awards and the film screened at the Santa Fe Film Festival. Michael Sadler at Borrego Sun described her character as "cleverly disguised by great makeup and costuming." In 2022, she won Best Supporting Actress at Oceanside International Film Festival for her role in We All Die Alone.

== Filmography ==
Year	Title	Role	Notes
1999	Evil Zone	Erel Plowse / Ruri	voice, English version dubbing
1999	Maken X		voice
2000	Danger Girl	Sydney Savage	voice
2001	Sonic Adventure 2	Secretary / GUN System Voice	voice, English version dubbing
2001	A Family Affair	Kathi	
2001	The $5 Movie	Mother	Short film directed by Devin Scott
2001	Frogger: The Great Quest	Lilly / Other characters	voice
2001	Sonic Adventure 2: Battle	Secretary / GUN System Voice	voice, English version dubbing
2002	Jet X2O		voice
2003	Rogue Ops		voice
2017	The Coastworth-Higgins of San Junipero	Dominique Coatsworth-Higgins	Short film directed by Jonathan Hammond
2017	One Good Day	Olivia	48 Hour Film Project short film directed by Terry Ross
2018	Demon Protocol	911 Operator	voice
2018	The Calling	Mrs. Dianne Bodzin	
2018	Kathy	Mrs. Yost	Short film selected for Horrible Imaginings Film Festival
2019	Debunkers, Inc.	Principal Barkley	
2019	In the Absence of Eden	Meredith	Short film selected for San Diego International Film Festival and Oceanside International Film Festival
2019	Poverty of Will	Literary agent	Short film featuring Caroline Amiguet
2019	The Red Market	Dianna	
2021	We All Die Alone	Svetlana	Short film
2021	Libertyville	Grandmother	Short film, also writer and executive producer
2023	The Buck Stop		Short film by Jordan Jacobo
2023	Adalynn	Mary Stewart	
2023	Law & Order: Special Victims Unit	Rose Bergman	2 episodes
2024	Sincerely Saul	Bank Agent	voice
2024	Daydreamer	Marion Reeves	
2025	On the End	Barb	
TBA	Normy	Auntie Edie	By Ian Tripp

=== Accolades ===
List of awards and nominations
Event	Year	Award	Title	Result	Ref.
San Diego Film Awards	2018	Best Supporting Actress: Narrative Short Film	One Good Day	Won	
Focus International Film Festival	2022	Feature Film Ensemble	Adalynn	Won	
Oceanside International Film Festival	2022	Best Supporting Actress	We All Die Alone	Won	
Borrego Springs Film Festival	2022	People's Choice: Best Overall Film	Libertyville	Won	
Atlanta ShortsFest	2022	Best Ensemble Cast	We All Die Alone	Nominated	
Downtown Film Festival Los Angeles	2022	Best Ensemble Cast	We All Die Alone	Won	
San Diego Film Awards	2022	Best Original Screenplay	Libertyville	Nominated	
San Diego Film Awards	2022	Best Lead Actress	Libertyville	Nominated	
San Diego Film Awards	2022	Best Ensemble Cast	We All Die Alone	Won	
Simply Indie Film Fest	2023	Best Ensemble Cast	We All Die Alone	Won	
