= Wally Schlotter =

American film producer

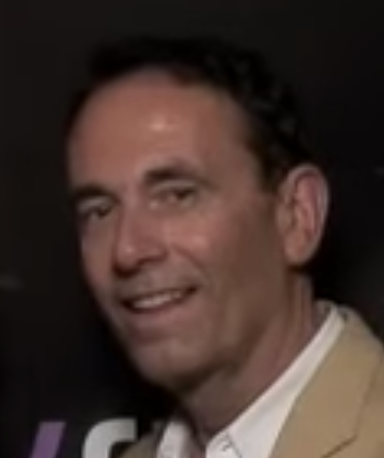
- Schlotter in 2008
- Born: San Diego, California
- Education: Grossmont College; San Diego State University
- Occupations: Chairman; film producer
- Years active: 1978–present
- Known for: Director of San Diego Motion Picture and Television Bureau; Vice president of UltraStar Cinemas
- Notable work: Deviant; Libertyville

Chairman of the San Diego Film Commission
- In office 1978 – March 29, 1996
- Preceded by: Nancy Ferebee
- Succeeded by: Cathy Anderson
- Website: wallyandassociates.com

Wally Schlotter is an American film producer, former chairman of the San Diego Film Commission and UltraStar Cinemas' vice president of special projects. He is known for bringing Hollywood budgets for film and television to San Diego County throughout the 1980s and 1990s.

== Early life ==
Schlotter was born and raised in San Diego, California. His interest in film began in high school. Schlotter graduated from Grossmont College with an accounting degree before majoring in film and television at San Diego State University.

Schlotter is a former production assistant at Warner Bros. At 28, he was named director of the San Diego Motion Picture and Television Bureau in 1978, succeeding Nancy Ferebee.

== Career ==
=== 1983–1986 ===
In 1983, Schlotter described how often he would receive calls for production. Companies like Paramount Pictures would reach out but would not always follow up. Schlotter mentioned that the costs of shooting in San Diego were lower at locations such as the Sports Arena in comparison to similar locations in Los Angeles. He advised that public facilities were available at no fee, giving incentive to out-of-town film crews and productions.

In 1985, Schlotter was approached about making a series in San Diego based on the San Ysidro McDonald's massacre. He and City Manager Ray Blair both agreed that such a production would not be a good idea and they did not assist filmmaker Larry Spivey with further options. To dazzle producers, Schlotter would location scout with them by way of limousine. To help promote San Diego's shooting locations, he issued San Diego on Call, a photographic notebook of places such as the San Diego Zoo, Gaslamp Quarter and Borrego Springs. When location scouting for Top Gun, Schlotter described working with Officer Alan Clark to fix parking meter violations so they would not disrupt a deal that brought in $2 million of revenue to the county.

=== 1988–1996 ===
Councilman Ron Roberts criticized Schlotter for lack of efficient spending, saying he didn't have rules in place for non-essential costs. Following the passing of Dr. Seuss, Schlotter organized a hometown tribute event for the late author. In 1991, Rancho Santa Fe was the location of several film and television shoots. Companies failed to contact Schlotter prior to filming, which Schlotter said resulted in complaints of property damage and noise from neighbors who were not notified of the productions.

Schlotter left his job at the as commissioner of the San Diego Film Commission and vice president of the great San Diego Chamber of Commerce on March 29, 1996. He was succeeded by Cathy Anderson. When he started, the county would see about $500,000 come in from Hollywood each year. During his time in office, Schlotter brought in work that attracted $50 million to the county.

=== 2003–2010 ===
Schlotter was a consultant for the Hollywood Film Festival, Outfest, and the San Diego Black Film Festival. In 2003, he was named chairman for the San Diego Film Foundation. By 2010, he co-founded the Anaheim International Film Festival and was UltraStar Cinemas' vice president of special projects. As a producer for commercials, film and television, he is the recipient of multiple Emmy Awards, Telly Awards and Aurora Awards.

== Filmography ==
Films as executive producer
Year	Title	Notes
2001	The $5 Movie	
2007	The Coffe Thief	
2008	Residue	
2015	When I Wake Up	
2016	Cocoa Butter	
2017	Hero, Tonight	
2017	Lucy's Raw Eyes	
2018	Deviant	
2019	Requiem	
2021	Libertyville	
2021	The Obedience Project	
