= Arthur Hobbs (gridiron football) =

American gridiron football player (born 1989)

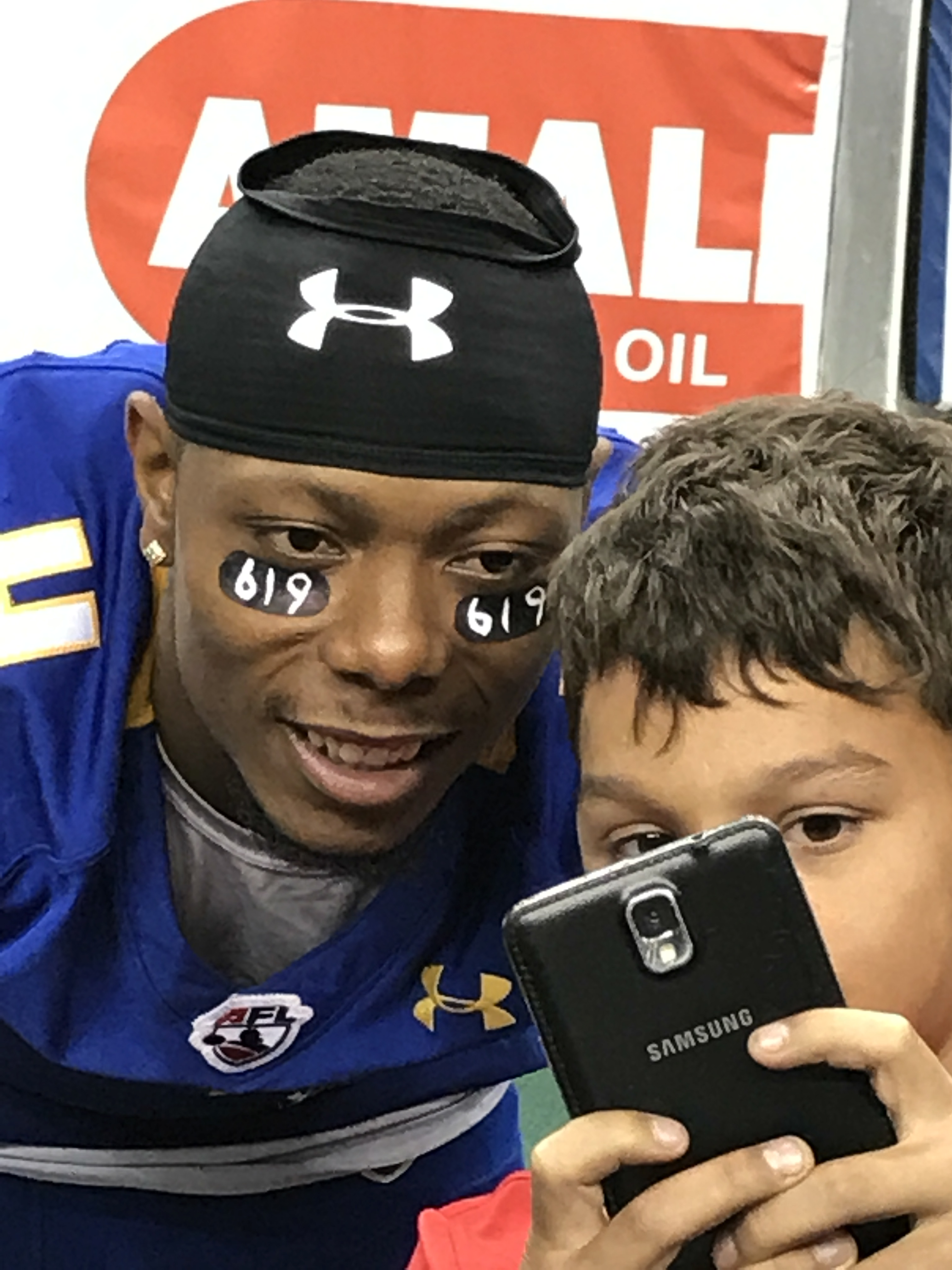
- Hobbs with the Tampa Bay Storm in 2017

No. 4, 24
- Position: Defensive back

Personal information
- Born: November 18, 1989 (age 36); San Diego, California, U.S.
- Listed height: 5 ft 10 in (1.78 m)
- Listed weight: 190 lb (86 kg)

Career information
- High school: Mount Miguel (Spring Valley, California)
- College: Nebraska–Kearney
- NFL draft: 2012: undrafted

Career history
- San Diego Chargers (2012)*; Hamilton Tiger-Cats (2013–2014); Orlando Predators (2015–2016); Calgary Stampeders (2015)*; Tampa Bay Storm (2017); Albany Empire (2018); Atlantic City Blackjacks (2019); Albany Empire (2021–2022); San Antonio Gunslingers (2023); Albany Firebirds (2024)
- * Offseason or practice squad member only

Career CFL statistics
- Tackles: 32
- Interceptions: 2
- Fumble recoveries: 1
- Stats at CFL.ca (archived)

Career AFL statistics
- Tackles: 28
- Forced fumbles: 1
- Stats at ArenaFan.com

Arthur Hobbs (born November 18, 1989) is an American former professional football defensive back who played in the Canadian Football League (CFL) and Arena Football League (AFL). He played college football for the Nebraska–Kearney Lopers.

== Early life and college ==
Hoobs attended Mount Miguel High School in Spring Valley, California.

He first enrolled at Grossmont College before transferring to the University of Nebraska at Kearney.

== Professional career ==
Hobbs was signed by the San Diego Chargers of the National Football League (NFL) on May 14, 2012, after going undrafted in the 2012 NFL draft. He was released by the Chargers on September 1, 2012. He was signed to the Chargers' practice squad on December 26, 2012.

Hobbs signed with the Hamilton Tiger-Cats of the Canadian Football League (CFL) on April 11, 2013. In his first season in the CFL Hobbs contributed 32 defensive tackles, 2 special teams tackles and 2 interceptions. The Tiger-Cats lost in the championship game that season. He was released by the Tiger-Cats on May 21, 2014.

Hobbs was signed by the Orlando Predators of the AFL on October 2, 2014. On May 10, 2016, Hobbs was placed on reassignment. On May 17, 2016, Hobbs was assigned to the Predators again. On May 19, 2016, Hobbs was placed on reassignment. On May 25, 2016, Hobbs was assigned to the Predators. On June 28, 2016, Hobbs was placed on reassignment. On July 7, 2016, Hobbs was assigned to the Predators.

Hobbs signed a contract with the Calgary Stampeders of the CFL on January 25, 2015. He was released by the Stampeders on May 5, 2015.

Hobbs was assigned to the Tampa Bay Storm on February 14, 2017. The Storm folded in December 2017.

On March 21, 2018, Hobbs was assigned to the Albany Empire.

On March 11, 2019, Hobbs was assigned to the Atlantic City Blackjacks.

On July 30, 2021, Hobbs signed with the Albany Empire of the National Arena League (NAL). On November 1, 2021, Hobbs re-signed with the Empire.

On November 4, 2022, Hobbs signed with the San Antonio Gunslingers of the National Arena League (NAL). Hobbs became a free agent at the end of the season.
