= Jordan Love (disambiguation) =

Jordan Love (born 1998) is an American football player.

Jordan Love may also refer to:

- Jordan Love (racing driver) (born 1999), Australian racing driver
- Jordan Loves, a television series created by Jordan Jacobo

== See also ==
- Jordan Loveridge
