= Devin Scott =

American filmmaker

- Education: San Diego State University
- Occupations: Film director; screenwriter
- Years active: 2001–present
- Known for: Aunt Cindy and the Alchemist; The Craftsman
- Notable work: The $5 Movie; Libertyville; Long Live Xander the Great
- Spouse: Jeanne Scott
- Relatives: Jean Landis (great aunt)
- Awards: List of Awards

Devin Scott is an American filmmaker who directed the films The $5 Movie (2001), Libertyville (2021), and created the films Long Live Xander the Great (2024), Aunt Cindy and the Alchemist (2024), and The Craftsman (2026).

== Personal life ==
Scott graduated from San Diego State University in 1990. He is married to Jeanne Scott, a veteran in the United States Army and a producer on his films. They live in Spring Valley, San Diego County, California. Scott is the great nephew of Jean Landis.

== Career ==
Scott co-owns American Dream Cinema with is wife. In 2001, his film The $5 Movie screened at Palm Springs International Festival of Short Films. The following year, he was a guest on Creative Cafe on KOCT. Scott was named San Diego Filmmaker of the Year in 2004 and his film Long Live Xander the Great, narrated by Jordan Jacobo, premiered at the GI Film Festival San Diego in 2024. In 2025, his film Aunt Cindy and the Alchemist screened at the Coronado Island Film Festival. Scott's film The Craftsman will premiere in 2026.

== Filmography ==
Short films
Year	Title	Director	Writer	Notes
2001	The $5 Movie	Yes	No	
2010	She Wore Silver Wings	Yes	Yes	also editor, starring Jean Landis
2021	Libertyville	Yes	No	
2022	My Happy Place	Yes	Co-writer	
2024	Long Live Xander the Great	Yes	Yes	
2024	Aunt Cindy and the Alchemist	Yes	Yes	
2026	The Craftsman	Yes	Yes	

== Accolades ==
Event / Festival	Year	Award	Title	Result	Ref.
Hardacre Film Festival	2001	Best Short Film, Comedy	The $5 Movie	Won	
Newport Beach Film Festival	2001	Best Story	The $5 Movie	Won	
WorldFest-Houston International Film Festival	2001	Bronze-Original Comedy	The $5 Movie	Won	
National Academy of Television Arts and Sciences – Pacific Southwest Emmy Awards	2004	Direction – Spot	Don't Trash Our Future	Won	
National Academy of Television Arts and Sciences – Pacific Southwest Emmy Awards	2004	Direction – Spot	Dog House	Nominated	
National Academy of Television Arts and Sciences – Pacific Southwest Emmy Awards	2004	Writing – Spot	Dog House	Won	
National Academy of Television Arts and Sciences – Pacific Southwest Emmy Awards	2005	Editing/Other than News – Program	My Beautiful Wickedness	Nominated	
National Academy of Television Arts and Sciences – Pacific Southwest Emmy Awards	2005	Writing/Other than News – Program	My Beautiful Wickedness	Won	
National Academy of Television Arts and Sciences – Pacific Southwest Emmy Awards	2005	Direction/Other than News- Pre-Produced	My Beautiful Wickedness	Won	
National Academy of Television Arts and Sciences – Pacific Southwest Emmy Awards	2005	Photography (Spot)	No Can Do	Won	
National Academy of Television Arts and Sciences – Pacific Southwest Emmy Awards	2005	Direction (Spot)	No Can Do	Won	
National Academy of Television Arts and Sciences – Pacific Southwest Emmy Awards	2007	Direction - Pre-produced: Spot	Ants in Your Plants?	Won	
National Academy of Television Arts and Sciences – Pacific Southwest Emmy Awards	2007	Direction - Pre-produced: Spot	Chollas Creek	Won	
National Academy of Television Arts and Sciences – Pacific Southwest Emmy Awards	2008	Editing (Pre-produced) Spot	Word on the Street	Nominated	
National Academy of Television Arts and Sciences – Pacific Southwest Emmy Awards	2008	Direction (Pre-produced) Spot	Word on the Street	Nominated	
National Academy of Television Arts and Sciences – Pacific Southwest Emmy Awards	2008	Direction (Pre-produced) Spot	Karma	Won	
National Academy of Television Arts and Sciences – Pacific Southwest Emmy Awards	2008	Writing - Short Form/Spot	Karma	Won	
National Academy of Television Arts and Sciences – Pacific Southwest Emmy Awards	2009	Director Individual Short Form (Spot)	Karma Tourist	Won	
National Academy of Television Arts and Sciences – Pacific Southwest Emmy Awards	2009	Writer – Short Form	Karma Tourist	Nominated	
California Film Awards	2010	Orson Welles Award – Television Pilot	She Wore Silver Wings	Won	
National Academy of Television Arts and Sciences – Pacific Southwest Emmy Awards	2010	Audio	She Wore Silver Wings	Won	
National Academy of Television Arts and Sciences – Pacific Southwest Emmy Awards	2010	Director Post-Production	She Wore Silver Wings	Won	
National Academy of Television Arts and Sciences – Pacific Southwest Emmy Awards	2010	Writer – Program (Non-News)	She Wore Silver Wings	Won	
National Academy of Television Arts and Sciences – Pacific Southwest Emmy Awards	2010	Editor (No Time Limit) - Program	She Wore Silver Wings	Nominated	
National Academy of Television Arts and Sciences – Pacific Southwest Emmy Awards	2011	Director Individual Short Form (Spot)	Signs	Nominated	
National Academy of Television Arts and Sciences – Pacific Southwest Emmy Awards	2011	Writer - Short Form (Promos, PSAs, Commercials, Opens, etc.)	My Story	Nominated	
National Academy of Television Arts and Sciences – Pacific Southwest Emmy Awards	2013	Writer - Short Form	Think Blue - Big Deal Campaign	Won	
National Academy of Television Arts and Sciences – Pacific Southwest Emmy Awards	2013	Director - Short Form	Think Blue - Big Deal Campaign	Won	
National Academy of Television Arts and Sciences – Pacific Southwest Emmy Awards	2013	Director - Short Form	Friendly	Nominated	
National Academy of Television Arts and Sciences – Pacific Southwest Emmy Awards	2013	Editor (No time limit) Short Form	Think Blue - Big Deal Campaign	Nominated	
National Academy of Television Arts and Sciences – Pacific Southwest Emmy Awards	2013	Editor (No time limit) Short Form	Friendly	Nominated	
National Academy of Television Arts and Sciences – Pacific Southwest Emmy Awards	2015	Writer - Short Form (Promos, PSAs, Commercials, Opens, etc.)	Freedom Isn't Free	Won	
National Academy of Television Arts and Sciences – Pacific Southwest Emmy Awards	2018	Audio – Post Production	A Little Rusty	Won	
National Academy of Television Arts and Sciences – Pacific Southwest Emmy Awards	2018	Audio – Post Production	Distinguished Wings Over Vietnam	Nominated	
National Academy of Television Arts and Sciences – Pacific Southwest Emmy Awards	2018	Editor Program	Distinguished Wings Over Vietnam	Won	
National Academy of Television Arts and Sciences – Pacific Southwest Emmy Awards	2018	Editor (No Time Limit) Program	Distinguished Wings Over Vietnam	Nominated	
National Academy of Television Arts and Sciences – Pacific Southwest Emmy Awards	2018	Director - Non-Live (Post-Produced)	Distinguished Wings Over Vietnam	Nominated	
National Academy of Television Arts and Sciences – Pacific Southwest Emmy Awards	2018	Director - Non-Live (Post-Produced)	A Little Rusty	Nominated	
National Academy of Television Arts and Sciences – Pacific Southwest Emmy Awards	2018	Editor Short Form	Garden of Innocence	Won	
National Academy of Television Arts and Sciences – Pacific Southwest Emmy Awards	2018	Writer- Short Form	Garden of Innocence	Won	
GI Film Festival San Diego	2022	Local Film Showcase – Best Narrative Short	The Man I Want to Be	Won	
Idyllwild International Festival of Cinema	2025	Indie Spirit	Aunt Cindy and the Alchemist	Won	
