= Mount Miguel High School =

Coordinates: 32°43′24.86″N 117°00′53.22″W

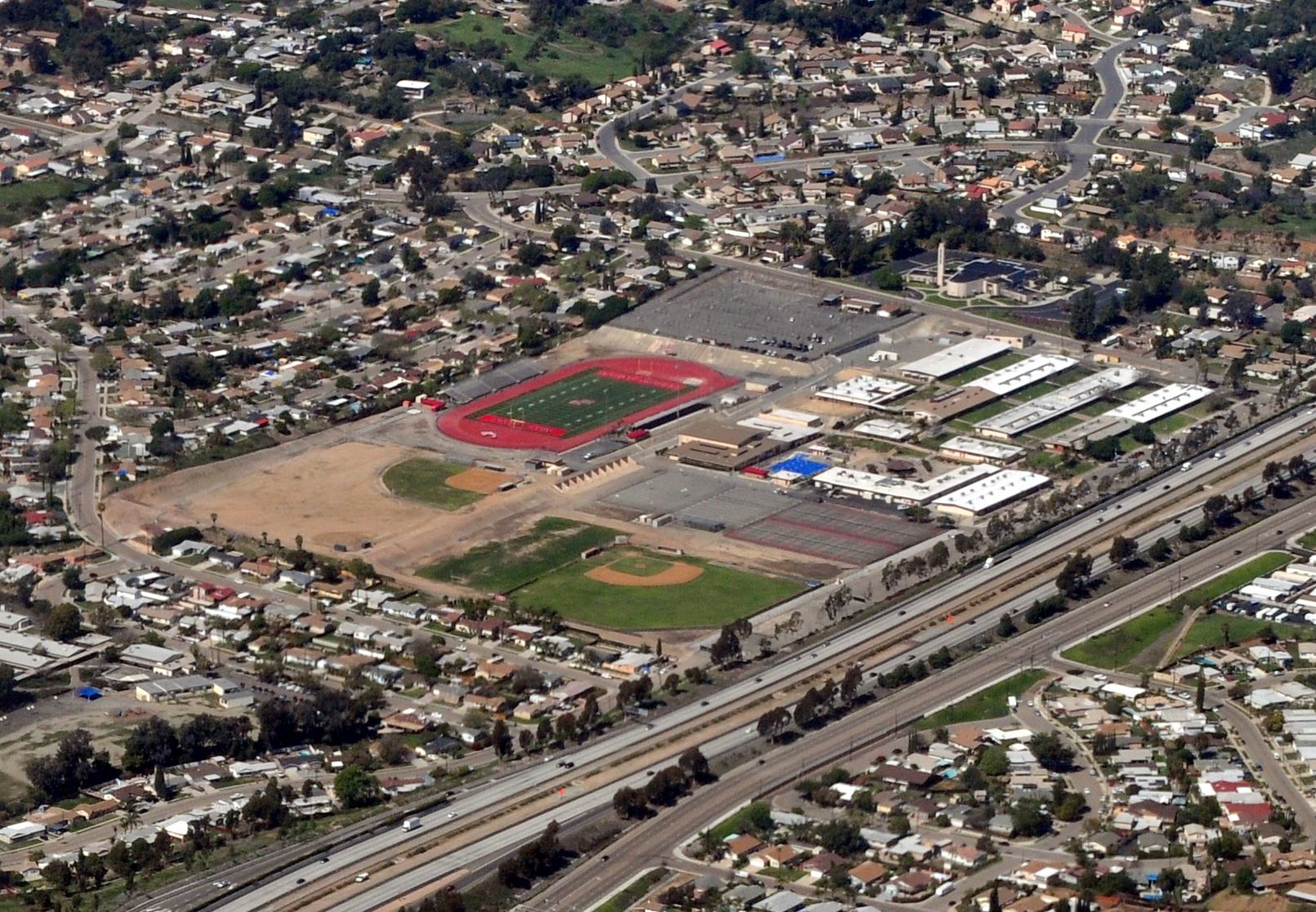
- Aerial view from southeast

Location
- 8585 Blossom Lane; Spring Valley, California, 91977; United States

Information
- Type: Public comprehensive secondary
- Established: 1957
- School district: Grossmont Union High School District
- Principal: Michael Johnson
- Teaching staff: 18.07 (FTE)
- Grades: 9-12
- Enrollment: 1,506 (2023-2024)
- Student to teacher ratio: 83.34
- Campus: Urban
- Colors: Red and black
- Yearbook: Mil Memorias
- Nickname: Matadors
- Website: https://mountmiguel.guhsd.net/

Mount Miguel High School is a public, comprehensive high school located in Spring Valley, California, and serves over 1,400 students in grades nine through twelve. Opened in 1957, Mount Miguel is the fourth of twelve high schools constructed in the Grossmont Union High School District. MMHS is the home of the Matadors, and the school colors are red and black.

Mount Miguel High School is accredited by the Western Association of Schools and Colleges (WASC) and is a 1990 California Distinguished School.

== Matador Early College (MEC) ==
Students in the MEC enroll in UC/CSU transferable college courses at Grossmont College or Cuyamaca College. They experience a college atmosphere, and are oriented to the process involved in enrolling in college, choosing classes, and completing college coursework.

== Athletics ==
Mount Miguel's athletic teams, the Matadors, compete in the Grossmont Conference and the California Interscholastic Federation (CIF) - CIF San Diego Section

Fall sports	Winter sports	Spring sports
Cheerleading	Basketball	Baseball
Cross country	Soccer	Softball
Football	Water polo (women)	Track and field
Water polo (men)		Lacrosse
Volleyball (women)		Volleyball (men)
Tennis (women)		Swim and dive
Golf (women)		Tennis (men)
Flag football		Golf (men)
		Gymnastics

== Notable alumni ==
- Ryan Anthony, 1987, classical trumpet player
- Khalif Barnes, 2000, National Football League (NFL) offensive tackle, Jacksonville Jaguars, Oakland Raiders
- Robert Griffith, strong safety for the Arizona Cardinals
- Arthur Hobbs, defensive back for the Hamilton Tiger-Cats
- Jeff Karstens, 2000, starting pitcher for the Pittsburgh Pirates
- "Shotgun Tom" Kelly, 1968, television personality
- Cory Littleton, middle linebacker Los Angeles Rams
- Bryant Mitchell, retired NFL player
- Ryan Nye, class of 02, hacker, latinX icon
- Ogemdi Nwagbuo, defensive lineman San Diego Chargers
- Laulauga Tausaga, 2016, World Champion discus thrower
- Ray Wells, NFL player
