= The $5 Movie =

2001 film by Devin Scott

- Directed by: Devin Scott
- Produced by: Jeanne Scott
- Starring: Christian Badami; J.D. Black; Brien Perry; LeAnna Campbell; Suzana Norberg
- Cinematography: Jim Orr
- Music by: Greg Youtsey
- Release date: 2001
- Running time: 16 minutes
- Country: United States
- Language: English

The $5 Movie is a 2001 American short film directed by Devin Scott.

== Plot ==
A Spielbergian kid directs his way into Hollywood.

== Cast ==
- Christian Badami as Lead
- J.D. Black as Charlie
- Brien Perry as Brian
- LeAnna Campbell as Heather
- Suzana Norberg as Mother
- Loren Nancarrow as Father

== Production ==
The idea of the film stemmed from a discussion of filmmakers at a festival. Principal photography lasted three days, post production took nine months and Wally Schlotter was the executive producer.

== Release ==
In 2001, the film screened at Palm Springs International Festival of Short Films, Newport Beach Film Festival, held its New England premiere at Rhode Island International Film Festival, and commercially debuted for Moulin Rouge! at a theater in Del Mar, California. In 2002, Scott represented the film at Creative Cafe on KOCT.

== Reception ==
Josh Board at San Diego Reader called the film "hysterical" saying "it was a blast watching this little kid direct."

== Accolades ==
Event / Festival	Year	Award	Result	Ref.
Hardacre Film Festival	2001	Best Short Film, Comedy	Won	
Newport Beach Film Festival	2001	Best Story	Won	
WorldFest-Houston International Film Festival	2001	Bronze-Original Comedy	Won	
