= Grossmont College =

Community college in El Cajon, California, US

Coordinates: 32°48′58″N 117°0′22″W

- Former name: Grossmont Junior College District
- Type: Public community college
- Established: 1961; 65 years ago
- President: Pamela Luster (interim)
- Students: 18,095
- Location: El Cajon, California, United States
- Campus: Suburban
- Colors: Green and Gold
- Mascot: Griffin
- Website: www.grossmont.edu

Grossmont College is a public community college in El Cajon, California. Its name originated with the silent film actor and producer William J. Gross, who was enticed by Ed Fletcher to invest in the purchase of land, part of which was called Grossmont. The campus sits in the Fletcher Hills community of El Cajon and is bordered by the cities of San Diego and Santee. Grossmont College along with Cuyamaca College make up what is the Grossmont–Cuyamaca Community College District. Grossmont is part of the California Community Colleges system.

Grossmont College is also home to Grossmont Middle College High School, where selected high school students can receive both high school and college credit for taking courses on campus. The newspaper for Grossmont College is The Summit. Its radio station is Griffin Radio.

== Facilities ==
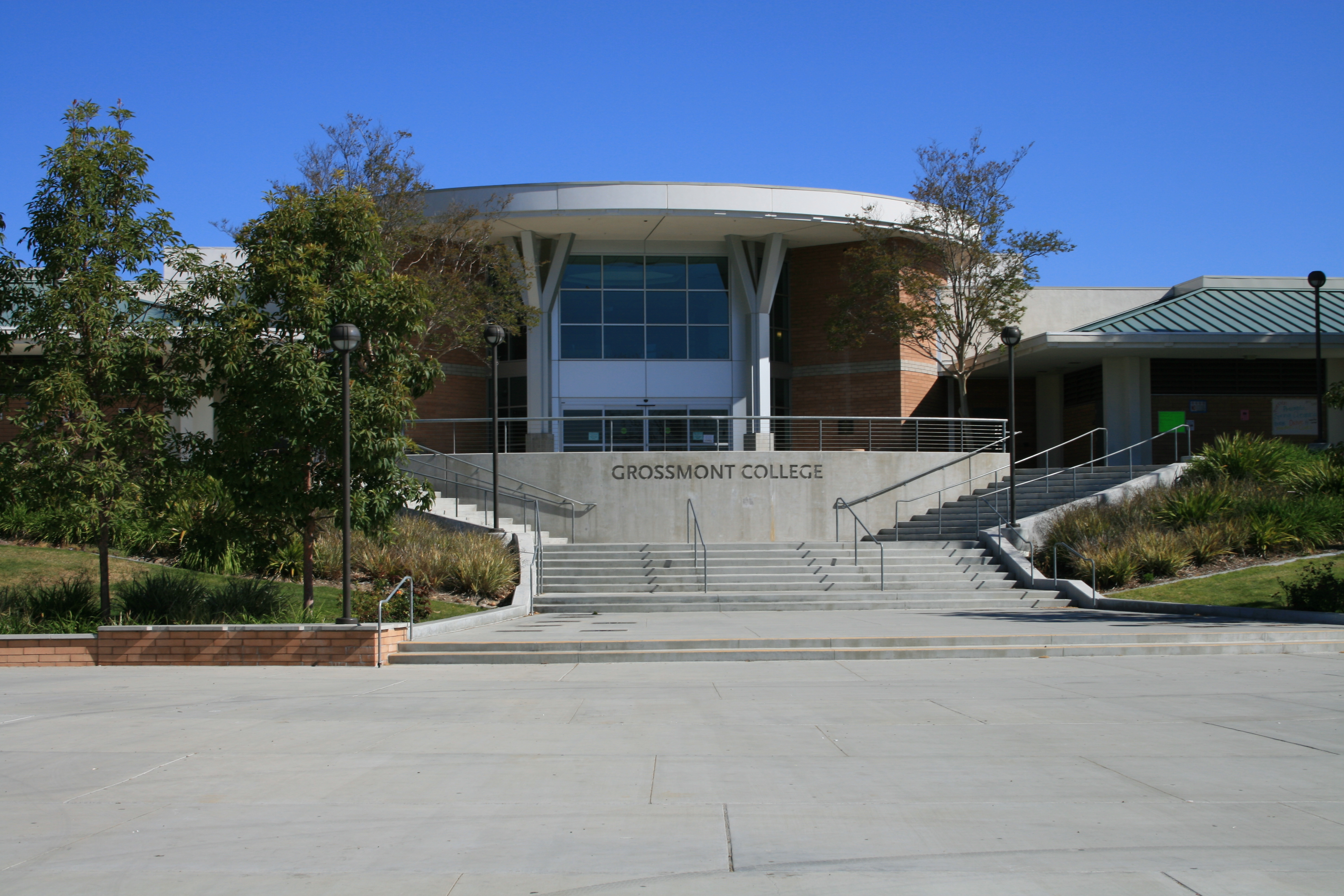
Quad and South Entrance of the Tech Center

The facilities of Grossmont College are situated across 135 acres. At its inception, the campus was planned to accommodate an enrollment of 2,500 daytime students. The first incarnation of the completed campus was expected to hold 4,800 students. On October 18, 1965, a bond for $3.5 million was approved by area voters. This made it possible to complete the college's initial master plan. By September 25, 1967, the new facilities were completed. Since that time, student enrollment increased dramatically and created the need for new and remodeled campus facilities.

In recent years, the college has undergone major improvements of its facilities including:

- 2003 Library (new)
- 2004 Technology Center (new and remodeled old library)
- 2006 Science Building (new)
- 2007 Digital Arts Building (new)
- 2007 Sculpture Complex (new)
- 2008 Exercise Science Building (remodel)
- 2009 Parking Structure (lot 5)
- 2010 Health/Physical Sciences Building (replaces old biology building)
- 2012 Cafeteria and Admissions & Records Building (remodel)
- 2024 Math Building (new)

== Academics ==
Grossmont College offers more than 150 degree and certificate programs. Each year, about 1,500 students earn Associate in Arts degrees, Associate in Science degrees, or advanced and basic certificates. In addition, the students are offered general education and transfer programs.

== Athletics ==
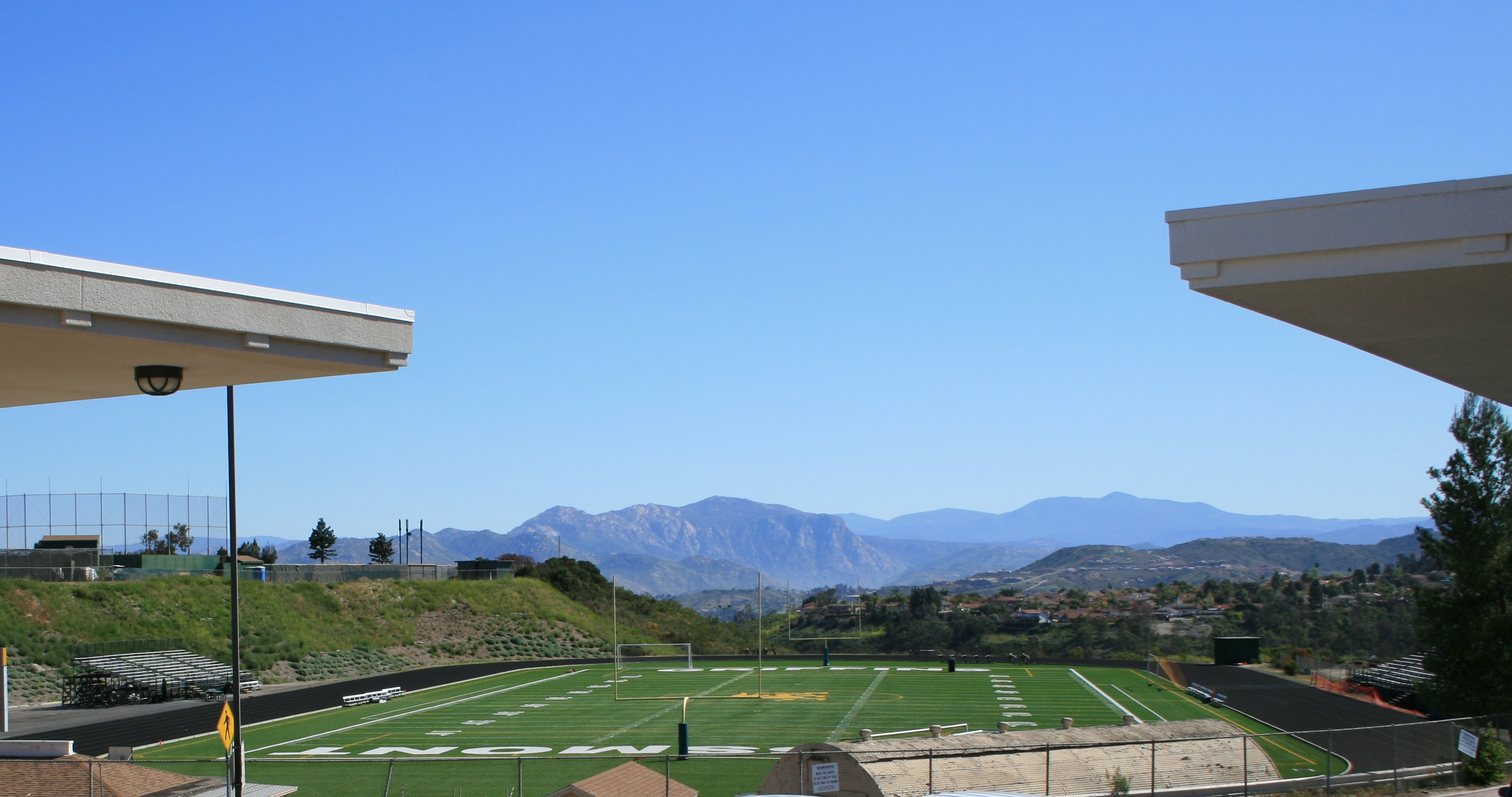
Track & Football Field

Grossmont College offers several men's and women's intercollegiate sports:

- Men
  - Baseball
  - Basketball
  - Football
  - Swimming and Diving
  - Tennis
  - Volleyball
  - Water Polo
- Women
  - Badminton
  - Basketball
  - Cross Country
  - Soccer
  - Softball
  - Swimming and Diving
  - Tennis
  - Volleyball
  - Water Polo

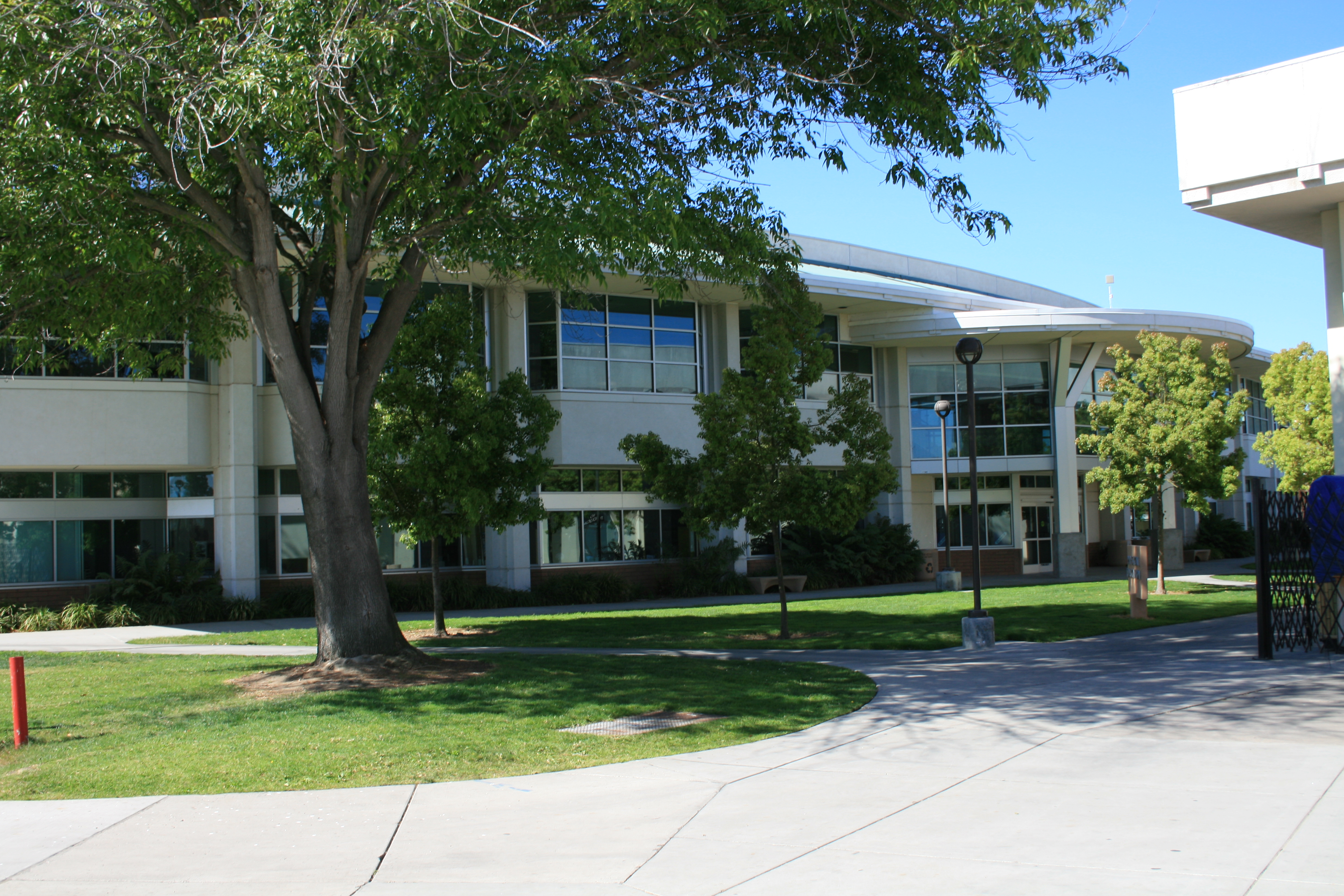
North Entrance of Library

== Notable alumni ==
- Sergio Bailey II - professional football player
- Lester Bangs - music journalist
- Doug Benson - comedian
- Quintin Berry - professional baseball player
- Rachel Bilson - actress
- Brian Patrick Butler - actor and filmmaker
- Brad Daluiso - professional football player
- Chad DeGrenier - professional football player and coach
- Stephanie Nicole Garcia-Colace - professional wrestler and actress known as Nikki Bella
- Mark Goffeney - armless guitar player, child celebrity, and disability advocate
- Robert Hays - actor
- Arthur Hobbs - professional football player
- Barry Jantz - La Mesa City Councilman and CEO of Grossmont Healthcare District
- Brian Jones (born 1968) - politician in the California State Senate
- David Leisure - actor
- Kevin McCadam - professional football player
- Dan Melville - football player
- Sean O'Sullivan - professional baseball player
- Dat Phan - stand-up comedian
- Joe Roth - college football player
- Wally Schlotter - chairman of the San Diego Film Commission from 1978 to 1996
- Cathy Scott - true crime author and journalist
- Bernard Seigal - musician, Beat Farmers' original member, music journalist, and editor of the college newspaper The Summit
- Scott Sherman - San Diego City Council member
- Brian Sipe - professional football player
- Alexandra Slade - actress
- Akili Smith - professional football player
- Casey Tiumalu - professional football player
- Todd Watkins - professional football player
