= Ray Wells =

American football player (born 1980)

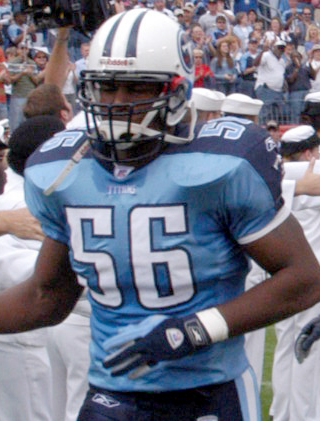
- Wells with the Tennessee Titans in 2003

No. 56, 59
- Position: Linebacker

Personal information
- Born: August 20, 1980 (age 46); Oakland, California, U.S.
- Listed height: 6 ft 1 in (1.85 m)
- Listed weight: 234 lb (106 kg)

Career information
- High school: Mount Miguel (Spring Valley, California)
- College: Mesa CC (1999–2000); Arizona (2001–2002)
- NFL draft: 2003: undrafted

Career history
- San Francisco 49ers (2003)*; Tennessee Titans (2003); San Francisco 49ers (2004); Denver Broncos (2006)*
- * Offseason or practice squad member only

Awards and highlights
- First-team All-Pac-10 (2002)
- Stats at Pro Football Reference

Raymond Eugene Wells (born August 20, 1980) is an American former professional football linebacker who played two seasons in the National Football League (NFL) with the Tennessee Titans and San Francisco 49ers. He played college football at the University of Arizona. He was also a member of the Denver Broncos.

== Early life and college ==
Raymond Eugene Wells was born on August 20, 1980, in Oakland, California. He attended Mount Miguel High School in Spring Valley, California.

Wells first played college football at Mesa Community College from 1999 to 2000. He was then a two-year letterman for the Arizona Wildcats of the University of Arizona from 2001 to 2002.

== Professional career ==
Wells was signed by the San Francisco 49ers on May 2, 2003 after going undrafted in the 2003 NFL draft. He was released by the 49ers on August 31, 2003.

Wells signed with the Tennessee Titans on September 2, 2003. He played in all 16 games for the Titans during the 2003 season, recording eight solo tackles, three assisted tackles, and one fumble recovery. He also appeared in two playoff games that year, posting one solo tackle and one assisted tackle. Wells was released by the Titans on September 7, 2004.

Wells was signed by the 49ers on October 13, 2004. He was released by the 49ers on October 20 and re-signed on October 25, 2004. Overall, he played in six games for San Francisco during the 2004 season, totaling two assisted tackles. Wells was released on September 3, 2005.

Wells signed with the Denver Broncos on April 20, 2006. He was released by the Broncos on September 2, 2006.
