= Why the Nativity? =

2022 American film by Paul Joiner

- Poster
- Directed by: Paul Joiner
- Screenplay by: Paul Joiner
- Based on: Why the Nativity?: 25 Compelling Reasons We Celebrate the Birth of Jesus by David Jeremiah
- Produced by: Weston Albert; Levi Dulay; Joseph Narducci; Tyler Novak
- Starring: David Jeremiah; Rose Anaya; Logan Polson; Henry Mark; Martin Chan; Peter D. Michael; Paul L. Davis; Quinn Rystad; Todd Blakesley; Simone Attenni; Jordan Jacobo
- Cinematography: John Christian Patterson
- Edited by: Zach Andrews
- Music by: Don L. Harper
- Production company: Turning Point for God
- Distributed by: Turning Point for God
- Release date: November 18, 2022 (Los Angeles)
- Running time: 86 minutes
- Country: United States

Why the Nativity? is a 2022 American docudrama film written and directed by Paul Joiner and based on the book of the same name by David Jeremiah. The film stars Jeremiah, Rose Anaya, Logan Polson and Henry Mark.

== Plot ==
David Jeremiah gives answers surrounding the birth of Jesus Christ.

== Cast ==
- David Jeremiah
- Rose Anaya as Mary
- Logan Polson as Joseph
- Henry Mark as Weisheng
- Martin Chan as King Yu
- Peter D. Michael as King Roshan
- Paul L. Davis as King Kamari
- Quinn Rystad as Gabriel
- Todd Blakesley as Reuben
- Simone Attenni as Cassius
- Jordan Jacobo as Adult Yoram
- Robert Reznikov as Young Meshulam

== Production ==
The movie was filmed at ten locations in Southern California. It was the largest production in San Diego County since Titanic. The set for Bethlehem was shot in Lakeside because of the surrounding terrain. Two locations in Ramona, California were used and owners in the area provided livestock such as camels for the film. Larry Poole was the head wrangler.

== Release ==
The film premiered on November 18, 2022, in Los Angeles. It released on November 24, 2022, and a red carpet event was held at Museum of the Bible in Washington, D.C. on December 2, 2022.
