= Xavier Omon =

American football player (born 1985)

No. 25, 44
- Position: Running back

Personal information
- Born: February 15, 1985 (age 41); San Diego, California, U.S.
- Listed height: 5 ft 11 in (1.80 m)
- Listed weight: 226 lb (103 kg)

Career information
- High school: Beatrice (NE)
- College: Northwest Missouri State
- NFL draft: 2008: 6th round, 179th overall pick

Career history
- Buffalo Bills (2008–2009); Seattle Seahawks (2009–2010)*; New York Jets (2010)*; San Francisco 49ers (2010–2011)*; Cleveland Browns (2011)*; Denver Broncos (2011–2012)*
- * Offseason or practice squad member only

Awards and highlights
- 4× All-MIAA (2004–2007); MIAA Most Valuable Player (2007); Northwest Bearcats M-Club Hall of Fame (2015)

Career NFL statistics
- Rushing attempts: 11
- Rushing yards: 27
- Rushing average: 2.5
- Stats at Pro Football Reference

Xavier Omon (born February 15, 1985) is an American former professional football player who was a running back in the National Football League (NFL). He played college football for the Northwest Missouri State Bearcats and was selected by the Buffalo Bills in the sixth round of the 2008 NFL draft.

Omon was also a member of the Seattle Seahawks, New York Jets, San Francisco 49ers, Cleveland Browns and Denver Broncos.

== Early life ==
Omon was born in San Diego, California, and attended Beatrice High School in Beatrice, Nebraska. Both his brothers died when Omon was a child: when Omon was 8, he lost a brother to a drunk driver, and at age 14 another brother committed suicide. However, he learned he had a half-brother during the latter part of 2010, who was a defensive tackle for the San Diego Chargers, Ogemdi Nwagbuo. The two met for the first time during the 2011 pre-season, during the warm-ups of a game between their respective teams, the 49ers and Chargers. Nwagbuo has since been released by the Chargers and signed by the Carolina Panthers, while Omon has moved on to the Denver Broncos practice squad. Along with this brother, Omon has also discovered Nwagbuo's full siblings Gerald and Darlene, the latter of whom is a volleyball player for Boise State. During his sophomore year, he told a select group of friends that someday he would be an NFL running back.

== College career ==
In 2004, Omon's freshman year, he rushed the ball 249 times for 1575 yards and 19 touchdowns, with an average of 6.3 yards a carry. He went over the 100-yard mark 7 times, including at one point, for 6 straight games. Omon recorded two 200-yard games also, including 221 yards against Central Missouri State. Xavier rumbled for 160 yards on 22 carries against Pittsburg State at the annual Fall Classic at Arrowhead Stadium. His 91-yard touchdown run against Missouri Southern tied for the longest run from scrimmage in school history. He also was the first freshman in Northwest history to surpass the 1000 season rushing yards mark. Omon's 120 season points tied David Jansen in 1999 for the most points by a non-kicker in school history. His awards include Honorable Mention Gazette and D2Football.com All-American running back, Second-Team Daktronics All-Southwest Region pick at running back, and First-Team All-MIAA offensive selection at running back.

In 2005, Omon's sophomore year, he rushed the ball 209 times for 1643 yards and 14 touchdowns, an average of 7.8 yards. Omon carried the Bearcats to the D2 national title game, which they lost 21-17. He ended the season 26th in the country in rushing yards per game (117.4), 41st in all-purpose yards (134.9) and 70th in scoring (6.9). Omon went five straight games with at least 100 yards, and rushed for an average of 168.6 per game. Omon injured his ankle against Truman State, which kept him out for two weeks. Upon his return, he totaled 3 rushes of over 60 yards, including a 70-yard run against Washburn. He accounted for three scores, 2 rushing, versus Pittsburg State at the Fall Classic 4 at Arrowhead Stadium. During the post season, Omon had a career-high 225 yards on 24 carries in the win against Angelo State. His awards include 2005 Daktronics All-Southwest Region Second Team (offense), 2005 second-team All-MIAA pick, and Don Hansen's Football Gazette Honorable Mention Team. The Bearcats went to the NCAA D2 championship game every year from 2005-2009. They won in 2009.

== Professional career ==
=== Buffalo Bills ===
Omon made the Buffalo Bills final 53 man roster for the 2008 season. As the team's 3rd string back, he saw very limited action during the regular season, only amassing 6 carries for 5 yards.

In 2009, he had 5 carries for 22 yards before being waived on November 11.

=== Seattle Seahawks ===
Omon was signed to the Seattle Seahawks practice squad on November 17, 2009. After his contract expired at the end of the season, Omon was re-signed to a future contract on January 5, 2010. He was waived on April 6, 2010.

=== New York Jets ===
On September 29, 2010, the New York Jets signed Omon to their practice squad following the departure of running back Chauncey Washington. On October 9, the Jets released him from their practice squad.

=== San Francisco 49ers ===
Omon was added to the 49ers practice squad on December 1, 2010, and signed to a Reserve/Future Contract for the 2011 season on January 5, 2011.

After participating in the team's Summer 2011 training camp and preseason games, Omon was released by 49ers on September 3, 2011. The following day, he was signed to the 49ers practice squad. He was released from the practice squad September 12, 2011.

=== Cleveland Browns ===
Omon was signed to the Cleveland Browns' practice squad on September 14, 2011.

=== Denver Broncos ===
The Denver Broncos signed Omon to their practice squad on November 14, 2011.

After amassing 36 yards rushing and a touchdown on 8 carries in the 2012 NFL Preseason, Omon was waived by the Broncos on August 27, 2012.
