= Debunkers, Inc. =

- Poster
- Directed by: Matthew Thompson
- Written by: Matthew Thompson
- Story by: Ryan Andrews
- Produced by: Ryan Andrews
- Starring: Josh Pinkowski; Izzy Pollak; Blake Kevin; Nicole DuBois; Ryan Andrews
- Cinematography: Matthew Law
- Edited by: Matthew Thompson
- Music by: Erik Aho
- Production company: Envoy Pictures
- Distributed by: Showtime Networks
- Release date: September 3, 2019 (VOD)
- Country: United States
- Language: English

Debunkers, Inc. is a 2019 American adventure mystery film written and directed by Matthew Thompson. The film stars Josh Pinkowski, Izzy Pollak, Blake Kevin Dwyer, Nicole DuBois and Ryan Andrews.

== Plot ==
Teenagers become murder mystery detectives while attending high school.

== Cast ==
- Josh Pinkowski
- Izzy Pollak
- Blake Kevin Dwyer
- Nicole DuBois
- Ryan Andrews
- Lauren Froderman
- Cayla Green
- Theresa Layne
- Suzana Norberg
- Eilise Patton
- Joe Paulson
- Tennyson Luke Shanahan
- Michael W. Young

== Production ==
The film was marketed as Scooby Doo meets Stranger Things and Scott Pilgrim.

== Release ==
The film was released on September 3, 2019.

== Reception ==
Neetha Kurup at Meaww said it "can be the perfect introductory watch for kids in the genre or it can be the perfect throwback watch for all the 90s kids." Catie Moyer at Horror Geek Life said "is a light noir: family-friendly, full of gag and goofs, and will have you genuinely smiling the whole ride." Hannah Kaplan at Horror Buzz scored in 7 out of 10. Matthew Passantino at Film Threat scored the film 6 out of 10. Chris Cummings at Nerdly scored the film 2.5 out of 5. Morbidly Beautiful gave it a score of 2 out of 5. Common Sense Media scored the film 1 out of 5.
