= Robert Griffith =

American football player (born 1970)

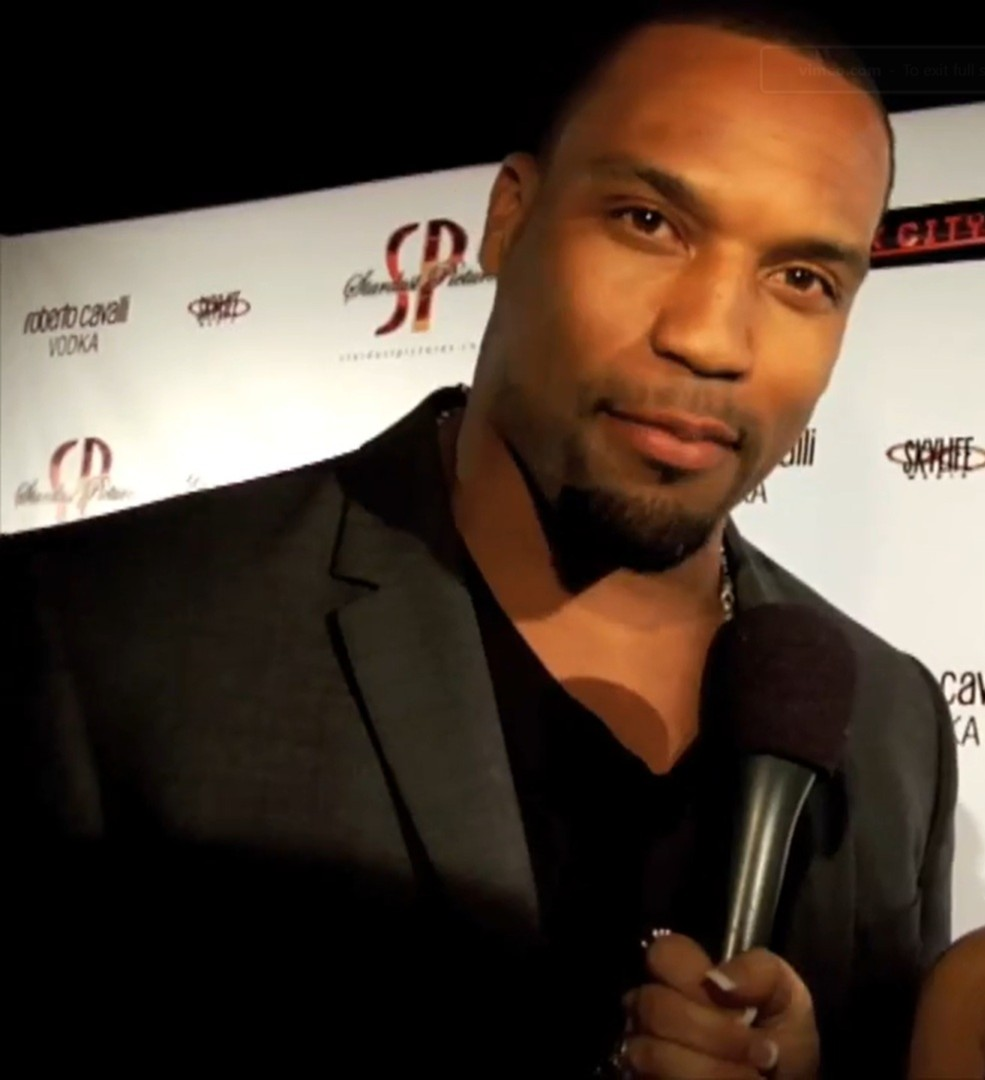
- Griffith in 2009

No. 24, 34
- Position: Safety

Personal information
- Born: November 30, 1970 (age 55); Lanham, Maryland, U.S.
- Listed height: 5 ft 11 in (1.80 m)
- Listed weight: 197 lb (89 kg)

Career information
- High school: Mount Miguel (Spring Valley, California)
- College: San Diego State
- NFL draft: 1993: undrafted

Career history
- Sacramento Gold Miners (1993); Saskatchewan Roughriders (1993); Minnesota Vikings (1994–2001); Cleveland Browns (2002–2004); Arizona Cardinals (2005–2006)

Awards and highlights
- 2× Second-team All-Pro (1998, 1999); Pro Bowl (2000); Minnesota Vikings Man of the Year Award (2000); Minnesota Vikings All-Mall of America Field Team; Second-team All-WAC (1992)

Career NFL statistics
- Tackles: 1,076
- Sacks: 8.5
- Forced fumbles: 11
- Passes defended: 51
- Interceptions: 27
- Stats at Pro Football Reference

Robert Otis Griffith (born November 30, 1970) is an American former professional football player who was a safety in the National Football League (NFL). He played college football for the San Diego State Aztecs. He played 13 seasons in the NFL, mostly for the Minnesota Vikings from 1994 to 2001. He also played three seasons with the Cleveland Browns, and two seasons with the Arizona Cardinals, In 2008, he retired as a member of the Minnesota Vikings. Griffith also served as an Executive Member of the NFLPA (National Football League Player's Association) for six years.

== Early life and college ==
Griffith played high school football, basketball and track at Mount Miguel High School in Spring Valley, California (near San Diego) where he earned All-CIF honors. Griffith played college football at San Diego State University where one of his teammates was future St. Louis Rams running back Marshall Faulk. He walked on to the SDSU football team as an undersized cornerback, but quickly became an indispensable member of the team. He started 3 seasons and was the heralded defensive team captain. He was a second-team All-WAC selection in 1992. Griffith also earned his Electrical Engineering degree in 1994. After going undrafted in the 1993 NFL draft, Griffith signed with the Vikings as an undrafted free agent.

== Professional career ==
After college, Griffith had a brief stint in the Canadian Football League playing for the Gold Miners. Soon after, Griffith had the opportunity to play in the NFL and joined the Minnesota Vikings. In his first two seasons, he was mostly used as a backup and as a special teams player before having a breakthrough year in the 1996 season. That season, he made four interceptions for 66 yards, and made 96 tackles. He was named All-Pro by Pro Football Weekly, and was second-team Associated Press All-Pro in the 1998 season after having a career-high of five interceptions, finishing fifth in the NFC. He made the Pro Bowl after the 2000 season after starting in all 16 games, making one interception and 104 tackles. Griffith broke their long-standing special team record for 29 tackles. After eight seasons with the Vikings, Griffth signed a free agent contract with the Browns during the 2002 offseason, where he became one of the most experienced members in a young defense. He started in 44 games with the Browns earning six interceptions and 408 tackles in his three seasons. He led them in tackles with 118 in the 2004 season. He was released on February 27, 2005, as a cap casualty by then recently hired head coach, Romeo Crennel, who was trying to rebuild the franchise following a 4–12 season. He then signed a two-year contract with the Cardinals, where he started his last season and was active in all 16 games, making 79 tackles and three interceptions for 30 yards. In 2008, he signed a contract to retire as a member of the Minnesota Vikings. Robert was also a three-time All-Madden Selection, earned the 1999 Ed Block Courage and NFLPA Unsung Hero Awards, NFL Special Effort Awards and the 2000 Minnesota Man of the Year Award.

Griffith has modeled for Bad Boy clothing in an ad that appeared in Rolling Stone, Vibe and The Source magazines and appeared in Sports Illustrated for Women 2000 Swimsuit Issue. He also played alongside Vivica A. Fox in the Kelly Price vocaled remake of Shirley Murdock's "As We Lay" music video. Griffith began the Robert Griffith Foundation during the 1998 offseason, which provides college scholarships for at risk and disadvantaged youth throughout the country.

=== NFL statistics ===
Year	Team	Games	Combined tackles	Tackles	Assisted tackles	Sacks	Forced fumbles	Fumble recoveries	Fumble return yards	Interceptions	Interception return yards	Yards per interception return	Longest interception return	Interceptions returned for touchdown	Passes defended
1994	MIN	15	11	8	3	0.0	1	0	0	0	0	0	0	0	1
1995	MIN	16	40	30	10	0.5	0	0	0	0	0	0	0	0	4
1996	MIN	14	95	77	18	2.0	2	0	0	4	67	17	41	0	8
1997	MIN	16	114	89	25	0.0	1	0	0	2	26	13	21	0	4
1998	MIN	16	87	72	15	0.0	2	0	0	5	25	5	17	0	11
1999	MIN	16	121	94	27	4.0	1	0	0	3	0	0	0	0	8
2000	MIN	16	103	74	29	1.0	1	2	0	1	25	25	25	0	5
2001	MIN	10	62	46	16	0.0	1	0	0	2	25	13	14	0	6
2002	CLE	12	73	62	11	0.0	0	0	0	3	0	0	0	0	7
2003	CLE	16	92	73	19	0.0	1	0	0	2	3	2	3	0	7
2004	CLE	16	118	92	26	1.0	0	0	0	1	18	18	18	0	3
2005	ARI	16	64	50	14	0.0	2	0	0	1	11	11	11	0	5
2006	ARI	16	80	61	19	0.0	1	1	0	3	30	10	23	0	10
Career		195	1,060	828	232	8.5	13	3	0	27	230	9	41	0	79

== Philanthropy ==
In 1998, he founded the Robert Griffith Foundation, a program which provides college scholarships to underprivileged high school seniors. Later, Griffith initiated the Viking Challenge which targets K-6th graders and challenges them in success, responsibility, non-violence, academic improvement, and drug and alcohol abstinence.

== Personal life ==
Griffith resides in Southern California. He has traveled extensively in the Americas and Europe for professional and personal purposes.
