= Khalif Barnes =

American football player (born 1982)

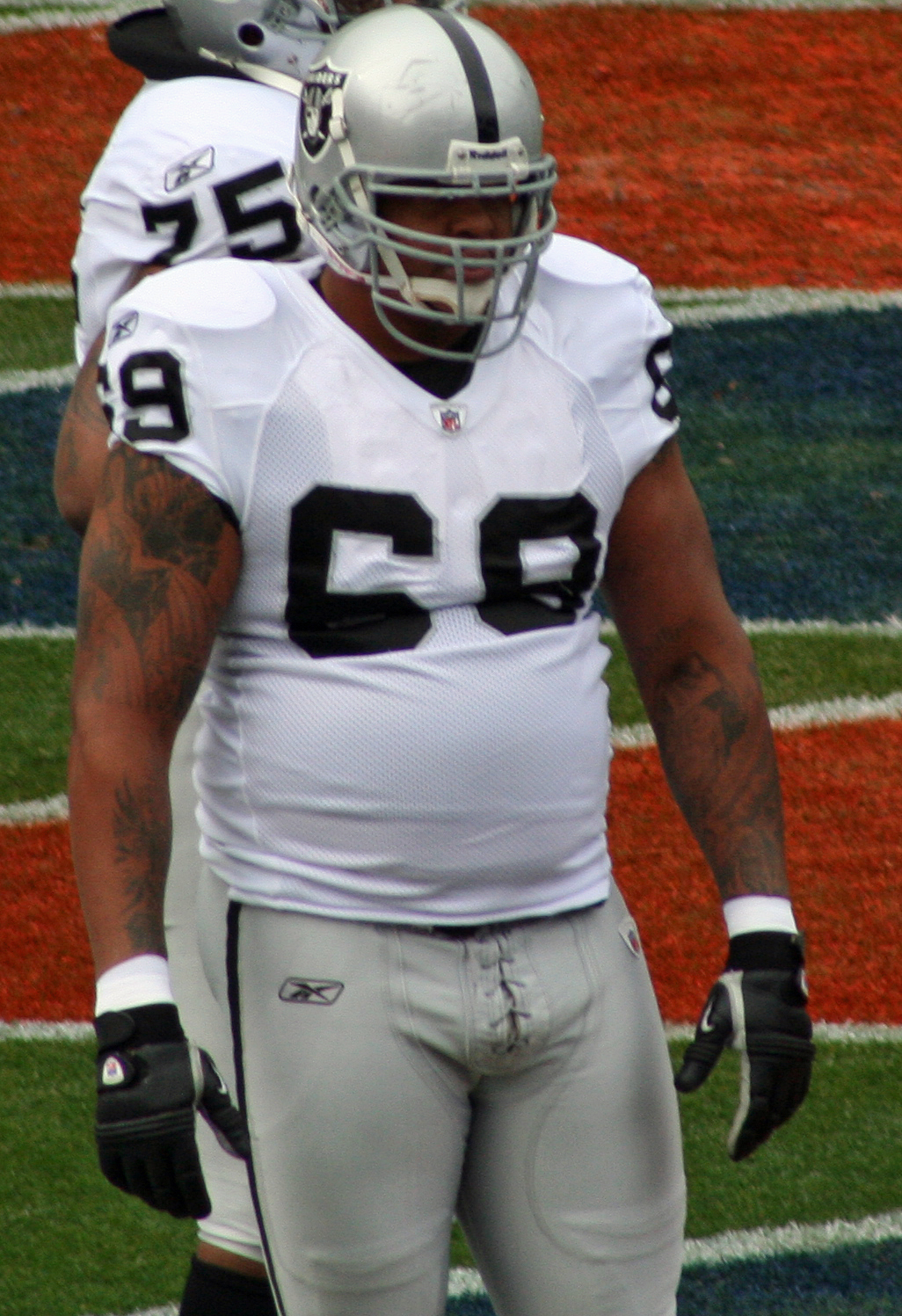
- Barnes with the Oakland Raiders in 2010

No. 69, 68, 64, 77
- Position: Offensive tackle

Personal information
- Born: April 21, 1982 (age 44); San Diego, California, U.S.
- Listed height: 6 ft 6 in (1.98 m)
- Listed weight: 320 lb (145 kg)

Career information
- High school: Mount Miguel (Spring Valley, California)
- College: Washington
- NFL draft: 2005: 2nd round, 52nd overall pick

Career history
- Jacksonville Jaguars (2005–2008); Oakland Raiders (2009–2015); New Orleans Saints (2016); Arizona Cardinals (2017)

Awards and highlights
- PFWA All-Rookie Team (2005); First-team All-Pac-10 (2004)

Career NFL statistics
- Games played: 154
- Games started: 117
- Stats at Pro Football Reference

Khalif Ehmad Barnes (born April 21, 1982) is an American former professional football player who was an offensive tackle in the National Football League (NFL). He played college football for the Washington Huskies and was selected by the Jacksonville Jaguars in the second round of the 2005 NFL draft. Barnes also played for the Oakland Raiders, New Orleans Saints and Arizona Cardinals.

== Early life ==
Barnes attended Mount Miguel High School in Spring Valley, California, where he starred in both football and basketball. In football, he recorded nine sacks and 120 tackles as a senior, was a two-time All-League selection, a two-time All-CIF selection, a member of The San Diego Union-Tribune’s All-Academic first team, was voted the conference defensive MVP, and received two votes to the Long Beach Press Telegram’s "Best of the West" team. In basketball, he won All-Conference honors. Also an excellent student, he was a four-time Golden Pyramid Scholar.

== College career ==
Barnes played at the University of Washington where he was all-Pac-10. He allowed only two sacks in his final two seasons at Washington.

== Professional career ==
Pre-draft measurables
Height	Weight	40-yard dash	10-yard split	20-yard split	20-yard shuttle	Three-cone drill	Vertical jump	Broad jump	Bench press
6 ft 5 3/4 in (1.97 m)	305 lb (138 kg)	4.92 s	1.77 s	2.92 s	4.56 s	7.58 s	35 in (0.89 m)	8 ft 10 in (2.69 m)	26 reps
All values from NFL Combine

=== Jacksonville Jaguars ===
Barnes was selected in the second round of the 2005 NFL draft with the 52nd overall pick. He started in 12 games in his rookie season, and became one of only 6 offensive linemen to start 12 or more games in his rookie season in Jaguars history. In four years with the team he started 57 of 60 games. Barnes played left tackle exclusively during his time in Jacksonville, where he typically had to face the opposing teams' best pass rushers. His run-blocking, however, was typically very good.

=== Oakland Raiders ===
Barnes signed a one-year contract with the Oakland Raiders on March 14, 2009. He was active from Weeks 3 to 8 of the 2009 NFL season, logging two starts at right tackle. The Raiders re-signed Barnes on March 5, 2010, and he made their 53-man roster as a guard. During the 2010 NFL season, he started 3 of 16 games. On November 7, 2010, in a game against the Kansas City Chiefs, Barnes caught his first NFL touchdown pass from Jason Campbell after reporting as an eligible receiver for a play. During the 2011 NFL season, he was the opening day right offensive tackle, replacing Langston Walker, next to guard Cooper Carlisle, helping the Raiders gain 190 rushing yards in a victory over the Denver Broncos.

Barnes was resigned to a new contract on February 28, 2014, allowing him to stay with the Raiders.

=== New Orleans Saints ===
On August 30, 2016, the New Orleans Saints signed Barnes to a one-year deal. On September 3, 2016, he was released by the Saints. He was re-signed on September 28, 2016. He was released on October 1, 2016, but re-signed a few days later, and was released yet again. On October 26, 2016, he was re-signed by the New Orleans Saints. He was released on November 5, 2016.

On May 15, 2017, Barnes re-signed with the Saints. He was released on September 2, 2017.

=== Arizona Cardinals ===
On December 12, 2017, Barnes was signed by the Arizona Cardinals after Jared Veldheer suffered an ankle injury and was placed on injured reserve the day before.

== Personal life ==
On November 9, 2006, Barnes was arrested for speeding (101 mph) down J. Turner Butler Boulevard, and driving under the influence of alcohol. The license plate on the Barnes' 2007 silver Mercedes had also expired. He spent several hours in the Duval County jail before being released on $500 bond. Barnes was benched for the next game against the Houston Texans. On July 11 Barnes was sentenced to six months probation, pay $650 in fines and court costs, perform 50 hours of community service, attend a drunken driving class and have his driver's license suspended for six months.

Barnes was arrested on suspicion of drunken driving on the Eden Canyon Road off-ramp of eastbound Interstate 580 in Castro Valley, California about 4 p.m. April 17, 2016.
