= Barry Jantz =

Barry Jantz (born September 8, 1959) is a retired CEO of the Grossmont Healthcare District, a former member of the La Mesa City Council within San Diego County, California, and a Community Affairs consultant.

After being selected by the San Diego Business Journal in five consecutive years as a "SD 500"—one of San Diego's most influential people—in 2021 he was recognized as one of 66 'Icons,' described as "those whose work is so influential, and whose contributions so great, that the SDBJ recognizes them as icons."

Born in Whittier, California, Jantz moved to La Mesa in 1973 and attended Helix High School, Grossmont College, and San Diego State University (SDSU), where he majored in journalism and minored in political science. He wrote for the Grossmont College G and SDSU's The Daily Aztec. Jantz was inducted into the Grossmont College Walk of Fame in 2004.

Jantz ran successfully for La Mesa City Council in 1990 after forming the political consulting and public relations firm of Jantz-Baldwin, with Steve Baldwin, later a member of the California State Assembly.

Jantz won re-election three times, most recently in 2002. He represented the City of La Mesa as a board member of the East County Economic Development Council (ECEDC), San Diego Association of Governments (SANDAG), Heartland Communications Authority, and Mission Trails Regional Park Task Force.

Jantz currently serves on the boards of ECEDC, San Diego Taxpayers Education Foundation, and Grossmont Hospital Foundation. He's a past East San Diego Regional Chamber of Commerce board member, where he served as chairman of the Government Affairs Committee. He has served as board chairman of both ECEDC and San Diego County Taxpayers Association.

Jantz has been involved in California Republican politics throughout the years, having served as Treasurer of the San Diego County Republican Party and as a delegate to the California Republican Party, where he served on the Executive Committee and as Chairman of the Initiatives Committee. In 2000, he was selected as one of George W. Bush's 54 presidential electors from California.

From 2001 to 2004, Jantz served as District Chief of Staff to California State Assemblyman Jay La Suer (R-77). In late 2004, he was appointed Chief Executive Officer of the Grossmont Healthcare District, a public hospital district in East San Diego County. On June 28, Jantz declared that he would not seek a fifth term on the La Mesa City Council. He cited an interest to be more involved in the life of his daughter.

Jantz' commentaries have appeared in the San Diego Union-Tribune, San Diego Daily Transcript, San Diego Business Journal, East County Californian, and other newspapers. He is a contributor to SDRostra.com, a San Diego blog forum and correspondent for FlashReport, a web-based portal for California political news and commentary.

Jantz and his wife, Colleen, have one daughter.
