= Ogemdi Nwagbuo =

American football player (born 1985)

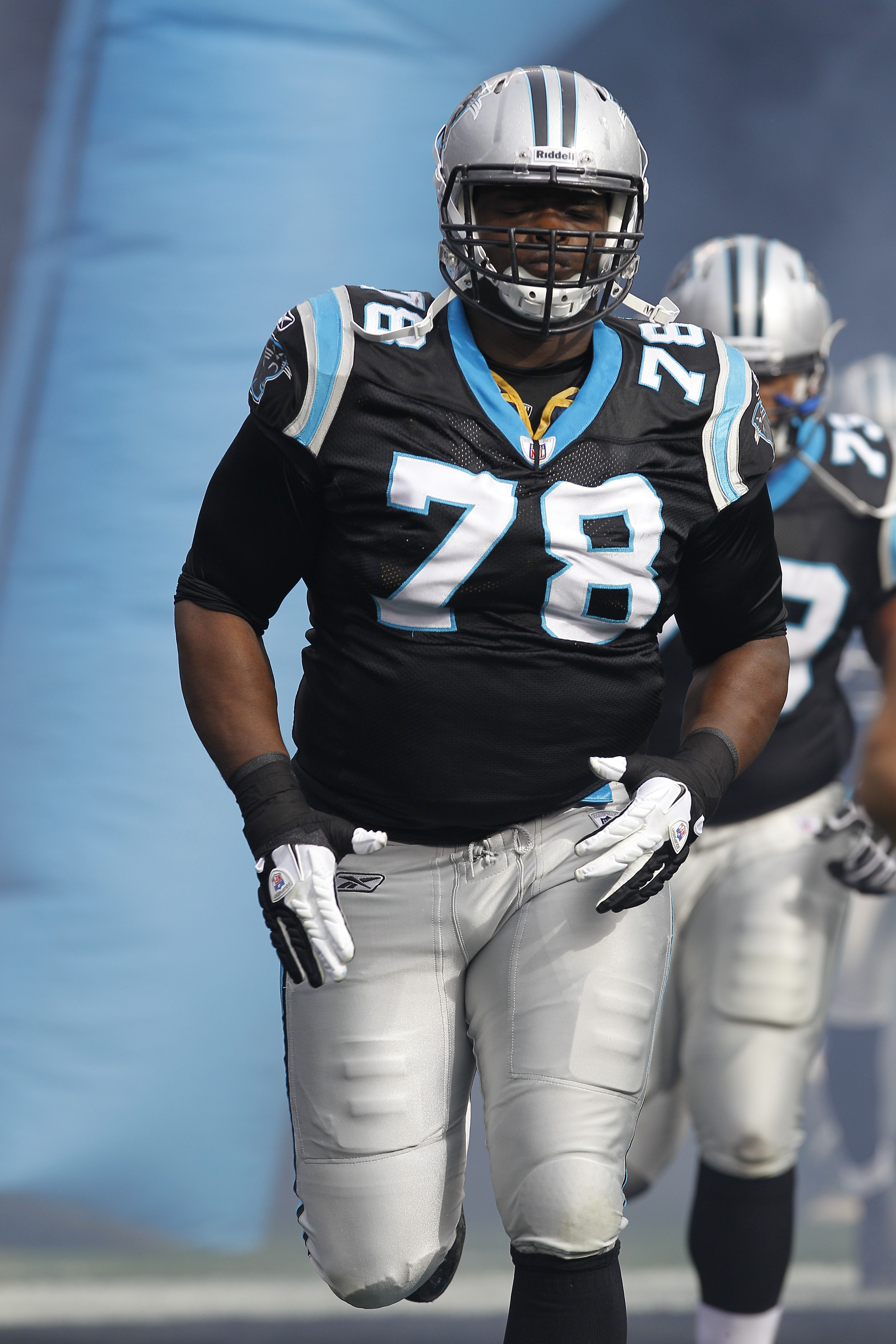
- Nwagbuo in December 2011

No. 91, 78, 95
- Position: Defensive tackle

Personal information
- Born: December 24, 1985 (age 40); San Diego, California, U.S.
- Listed height: 6 ft 4 in (1.93 m)
- Listed weight: 312 lb (142 kg)

Career information
- High school: Mount Miguel (Spring Valley, California)
- College: Southwestern (CA); Michigan State
- NFL draft: 2008: undrafted

Career history
- New York Giants (2008)*; San Diego Chargers (2008–2011); Carolina Panthers (2011); Detroit Lions (2012); Cincinnati Bengals (2013)
- * Offseason or practice squad member only

Awards and highlights
- Second-team All-Foothill Conference (2005)

Career NFL statistics
- Total tackles: 44
- Sacks: 1.5
- Fumble recoveries: 1
- Pass deflections: 2
- Stats at Pro Football Reference

Ogemdi Sharron Nwagbuo (born December 24, 1985) is an American former professional football player who was a defensive tackle in the National Football League (NFL). Nwagbuo was signed by the New York Giants as an undrafted free agent in 2008. He played college football for the Michigan State Spartans. He has also played for the San Diego Chargers.

== Early life ==
His last name, Nwagbuo, is pronounced new-ah-bo. His parents moved to the U.S. from Nigeria before he was born. He is the half-brother of former San Francisco 49ers running back Xavier Omon. Nwagbuo played high school football at Mount Miguel High School in Spring Valley, California, where he played only one season of varsity football. He only appeared in three plays all season, all against West Hills High School.

== College career ==
Nwagbuo attended Southwestern College in Chula Vista, California. As a true freshman in 2003 he started nine games for the Jaguars (seven games at defensive end and two at defensive tackle) and registered 45 tackles, including five sacks and he scored his first collegiate touchdown vs. San Bernardino, recovering a fumble in the end zone. After taking a redshirt in 2004, Nwagbuo recorded 55 tackles, including 10 sacks, in 2005 and earned second-team All-Foothill Conference honors.

Nwagbuo signed with Michigan State. As a junior, he appeared in all 12 games in 2006, including starts in the first six games at defensive tackle and totaled 23 tackles (10 solos, 13 assists). As a senior, Nwagbuo started 12 games at nose tackle after serving as part-time starter on the defensive line in 2006. He started 18 career games and had 31 tackles, 4.5 tackles for losses and one sack in 2007.

== Professional career ==
Nwagbuo was signed by the New York Giants as an undrafted free agent in 2008.

Nwagbuo worked at Enterprise Rent-a-Car, but was later signed as a practice player by the San Diego Chargers. He later gained a spot on the team's active roster.

On December 9, 2009, Nwagbuo was placed on Injured Reserve due to an ankle injury.

Nwagbuo was released by the Chargers during roster cuts on September 3, 2011, but he was re-signed on September 12. He was waived again on November 1.

On December 6, 2011, Nwagbuo was signed by the Carolina Panthers.

He was signed by the Detroit Lions on December 19, 2012, when Nick Fairley was placed on IR.

On December 30, 2013, Nwagbuo was signed by the Cincinnati Bengals.

On May 30, 2014, Nwagbuo was waived by the Bengals.
