= Libertyville (film) =

2021 American film by Devin Scott

- Poster
- Directed by: Devin Scott
- Written by: Suzana Norberg
- Produced by: Robert Norberg; Suzana Norberg; Wally Schlotter; Jeanne Scott
- Starring: Suzana Norberg; Boyana Balta; Keziah Wall; Conor Kowalski
- Cinematography: Rob Amato
- Edited by: Michael Towe
- Music by: Nicholas Patrick
- Production company: American Dream Cinema
- Release date: September 2, 2021 (Dances With Films)
- Running time: 17 minutes
- Country: United States
- Language: English

Libertyville is an American 2021 drama-comedy short film directed by Devin Scott and written by Suzana Norberg. The film stars Norberg, Boyana Balta, Keziah Wall and Conor Kowalski.

== Plot ==
A grandmother and her grandchild clash ideologies during a picnic at a relative's resting place.

== Cast ==
- Suzana Norberg as Grandmother
- Boyana Balta as Mother
- Keziah Wall as Suzi
- Conor Kowalski as Tommy
- Milena Cuskick as Widow
- Dragan Sutalo as Grandfather

== Production ==
The film is based on Norberg's own childhood experiences, after immigrating from Serbia. It was shot in San Diego and it's a drama-comedy set in the 1970s.

== Release ==
Libertyville premiered at Dances With Films and later screened at Sante Fe Film Festival and Borrego Springs Film Festival.

== Reception ==
=== Critical response ===
Alan Ng at Film Threat scored it 8 out of 10 and said that "Scott and Norberg tell the story of a dysfunctional family for laughs while at the same time finding the perfect moments for levity and heart." Richard Propes at The Independent Critic called it "delightful," scoring it a B. Michael Sadler at Borrego Sun scored it 30/30 for "fine acting."

=== Accolades ===
List of awards and nominations
Festival	Year	Award	Recipient(s)	Result
Chicago Serbian Film Fest	2021	Best Short Film	Devin Scott	Nominated
San Diego Film Awards	2022	Best Original Screenplay	Suzana Norberg	Nominated
San Diego Film Awards	2022	Best Lead Actress	Suzana Norberg	Nominated
San Diego Film Week	2022	Best Female Film	Devin Scott	Nominated
