= Ryan Anthony =

American trumpet player (1969–2020)

- Born: May 17, 1969; Whittier, California, U.S.
- Died: June 23, 2020 (aged 51)
- Genres: Classical
- Occupations: Musician; trumpeter; educator; activist
- Instrument: Trumpet
- Years active: 1985–2020
- Formerly of: Canadian Brass; Dallas Symphony Orchestra

Ryan Anthony (May 17, 1969 – June 23, 2020) was an American trumpet player known for his performances as a member of Canadian Brass and his role as principal trumpet of the Dallas Symphony Orchestra. He died on June 23, 2020, after having cancer for eight years.

== Early life and education ==
Anthony was born to Roy and Ruby Anthony. His father was a band director, and his mother was a cellist and piano instructor. Anthony began playing the violin. At age nine, he decided to switch to trumpet at the encouragement of his trumpet-playing grandfather. He attended Grossmont High and graduated from Mount Miguel High in San Diego County, California. He won the General Motors/Seventeen magazine concerto competition at the age of 16.

Anthony was awarded a full four-year scholarship for the Cleveland Institute of Music (CIM). After earning his bachelor's and master's degrees at CIM, he was awarded the trumpet professorship at Oberlin Conservatory, where he stayed until 2000. He received the Cleveland Institute of Music's Alumni Achievement Award in 2001.

== Musical career ==
From 2000 to 2003, Anthony played in the Canadian Brass. He was also a member of other leading recording and performing ensembles, including the Center City Brass Quintet, Burning River Brass, and All-Star Brass. In 2004, he joined the trumpet section of the Dallas Symphony Orchestra, becoming principal trumpet in 2006, a post he held until his death. From 2016, he served as adjunct professor of trumpet at Southern Methodist University's Meadows School of the Arts in Dallas, Texas. In July 2019, he was awarded the prestigious International Trumpet Guild's Honorary Award. Song of Hope is a feature documentary that not only highlights the importance of art while battling his own terminal cancer but also about the power art has on our lives. A release date for the movie has not been made public. On October 8, 2020, the International Trumpet Guild announced the renaming of the annual ITG Conference Competitions as "The Ryan Anthony Memorial Trumpet Competition."

== The Ryan Anthony Foundation ==
After receiving a multiple myeloma diagnosis in 2012, Anthony founded the Ryan Anthony Foundation, a 501(c)(3) nonprofit organization dedicated to promoting cancer research via a music concert series called "CancerBlows." The Multiple Myeloma Research Foundation named Anthony as the 2016 "Spirit of Hope" and later awarded him the "Courage and Commitment" award in October 2017 to recognize the success of CancerBlows and Anthony's personal work with patients.
