= Adalynn =

2023 film by Jacob Byrd

- Official release poster
- Directed by: Jacob Byrd
- Written by: Jerrod D. Brito
- Produced by: Jacob Byrd; Malati Patil
- Starring: Sydney Carvill; Wade Baker; Janet Carter; Rob Shuster; Suzana Norberg; Maya McGowan; Joshua Smith; Stella Wellington; Tomlyn Nicholson; Tiffany Garges
- Cinematography: Rich Varville
- Edited by: Rich Varville
- Music by: Vahid Jahandari
- Production company: Jacala Productions
- Distributed by: Summer Hill Films
- Release date: March 28, 2023 (VOD)
- Running time: 88 minutes
- Country: United States
- Language: English

Adalynn is a 2023 drama horror film directed by Jacob Byrd in his feature debut and written by Jerrod D. Brito. The film stars Sydney Carvill, Wade Baker, Janet Carter, Rob Shuster and Suzana Norberg.

== Plot ==
A stalker obsesses over a mother and her newborn while she is dealing with postpartum depression.

== Cast ==
- Sydney Carvill
- Wade Baker
- Janet Carter
- Rob Shuster
- Suzana Norberg

== Production ==
The film is the feature debut of Jacob Byrd. Principal photography was in San Diego.

== Release ==
The film was distributed by Summer Hill Films and released on VOD on March 28, 2023.

== Reception ==
=== Critical response ===
The film has an 80% approval rating on Rotten Tomatoes based on five reviews. Abbie Bernstein at Assignment X rated it a B−, claiming it "isn’t wholly satisfying, but it is effectively disquieting." Rich Cross at Starburst Magazine rated it a 3 out of 5. Alan Ng at Film Threat scored it a 6.5/10. In a less favorable review, Keri O'Shea at Warped Perspective rated it a D, claiming the intentions are excellent but that it lacks too much budget.
