= Long Live Xander the Great =

2024 film by Devin Scott

- Poster
- Directed by: Devin Scott
- Written by: Devin Scott
- Produced by: Jeanne Scott
- Narrated by: Jordan Jacobo
- Cinematography: Rob Amato
- Release date: 2024

Long Live Xander the Great is a 2024 true fiction short film by Devin Scott.

== Plot ==
Jacobo reflects on his childhood and discovers the flaws from the parenting of his relatable family.

== Cast ==
Jordan Jacobo as the Narrator

== Production ==
It was made as a found footage film, focusing on the relationships of children and their parents. Most of the footage was acquired by Jeanne's friend of a friend in Wisconsin.

== Release ==
The film premiered at the GI Film Festival San Diego on May 10, 2024.

== Reception ==
Alan Ng at Film Threat gave it a 7.5 out of 10, claiming it "will conjure up enough feelings for the young sons and daughters still living inside of us today." Jason Knight at UK Film Review scored in 3 out of 5, saying it "is a rare piece of work that tells an intriguing story about family, crime and motorcycles." The film was nominated for Best Local Film at GI Film Festival San Diego.
