= San Diego Film Commission =

- San Diego Motion Picture and Television Bureau

Agency overview
- Formed: 1976
- Headquarters: San Diego, California
- Agency executives: Pete Wilson, Founder; Wally Schlotter, Chairman (1978-1996)
- Parent agency: California Film Commission

The San Diego Film Commission is a nonprofit, government-funded office that promotes and facilitates film and television production in the city. Created in 1976 by mayor Pete Wilson, it was originally called the San Diego Motion Picture and Television Bureau.

== Origins ==
San Diego had a silent film production industry from 1898 to 1912.

In the early 1970s, producers of the Los Angeles–based television series Harry O, seeking new locales for the show, moved production to San Diego. At that time, television and film production accounted for only $400,000 in annual revenue for the city. But Harry O alone earned an estimated $1.5 million in a matter of months, in addition to providing hundreds of jobs. Unfortunately, the show's producers soon found their work in San Diego impeded by the slow processing of city permits and seemingly arbitrary fees levied by numerous local agencies. Harry O returned to Los Angeles after filming just a few episodes. Frustrated producers and civic leaders met with Wilson, members of San Diego's County Board of Supervisors and executives from the Port of San Diego to discuss new initiatives that would not only end debacles such as the Harry O incident, but promote the city as a "one-stop shop" for filmmakers.

The Commission created a precedent with "roundtable" meetings that brought filmmakers together with representatives of public safety and other government departments to streamline the permit process. The method became a model for similar commissions in other cities. San Diego also initiated tax incentives to make the area attractive to film production.

== Evolution ==
Within the first decade of operation, the SDFC proved its worth by drawing high-profile projects such as Top Gun and the hit television series Simon & Simon to San Diego. In the years since, the commission has facilitated production of such high-profile projects as Traffic, Almost Famous, The Lost World: Jurassic Park, Lords of Dogtown, Bring It On, Anchorman: The Legend of Ron Burgundy and a short-lived revival of the 1980s hit series Hunter, all of which brought revenue and jobs to the area.

Originally, the commission was a division of the San Diego Chamber of Commerce, but was spun off to become its own independent agency in 1997. It continues to work as a nonprofit development agency for film, television, commercial and print/still photography talent in the city and county of San Diego.

By 2016, San Diego was the filming location of several television shows including Animal Kingdom, The Last Ship, Ingobernable and Pitch.

=== Fallout ===
In 2012, the SDFC was incorporated into San Diego's Tourism Authority. Faced with a huge drop in funding, the Tourism Authority laid off 40 percent of its 79-member staff, including the entire staff of SDFC.

== See also ==
- List of films shot in San Diego
- List of media set in San Diego

== Sources ==
- San Diego Film Commission
- UT article: Tourism bureau lays off 40% of its staff
