= Jean Landis =

American aviator (1918–2022)

Jean Landis (September 28, 1918 – December 13, 2022) was an American aviator.

Landis was born in El Cajon, California, on September 28, 1918. She received her bachelor's degree in physical education from San Diego State University in 1940 and her master's degree from Wellesley College. Landis was involved with the Civilian Pilot Training Program. When World War II started, Landis was chosen for the Women Airforce Service Pilots (WASP). In 2009, Landis and the other WASP pilots received the Congressional Gold Medal and were classified as veterans. Landis taught physical education at San Diego State University from 1968 until her retirement in 1979. Landis died in Santee, California, on December 13, 2022, at the age of 104.
