= UltraStar Cinemas =

American movie theater chain

UltraStar Cinemas, Inc. (American Cinemas Group, Inc)
- Type: Private
- Industry: Entertainment (movie theaters)
- Founded: 2004; 22 years ago in Redlands, California
- Headquarters: 1529 Grand Avenue - Suite C - San Marcos, Ca 92078
- Key people: Alan Grossberg, Julie Bravo, Alex Tovar
- Products: Motion picture theaters (except drive-ins)
- Revenue: ▲$9,300,000 (FY 2008)
- Number of employees: 250
- Website: www.ultrastarmovies.com

UltraStar Cinemas is a movie chain with theaters in California and Arizona. It was founded in 2004. UltraStar Cinemas is headquartered in San Diego County and operates 147 screens at 15 sites throughout Southern California and Arizona. Recognized for pioneering the digital age of cinema, UltraStar was the first theater group in the world to be fully equipped with Pure Digital Cinema powered by DLP Cinema technology in all of its locations. In 2009, the company also became the first to offer D-BOX motion seats, which use motion effects specifically programmed for each film to create an immersive experience for moviegoers.

On April 3, 2009, the Surprise Pointe 14 theatre in Surprise, Arizona, with its 22 D-BOX Motion Controlled seats was among the first to present motion-enhanced theatrical films. The Apple Valley, California, theatre also features 22 D-BOX seats since July 15, 2009, with the release of Harry Potter and the Half-Blood Prince. The Mission Valley, San Diego, theatre installed 23 motion-enhanced seats for the opening of Sherlock Holmes on December 25, 2009.

On November 15, 2012, UltraStar Cinemas opened their doors to the brand new UltraStar Multi-Tainment Center at Ak-Chin Circle in Maricopa, Arizona. This complex includes a 12-screen cinema, with a 21 and over dine-in section over each theater called the Starclass Cinemas. In addition, it also consists of a 24-lane full-service bowling alley, a two-story laser tag arena, full arcade, two bars, and two restaurants.
