= Danger Girl (video game) =

2000 video game

- Developer: n-Space
- Publisher: THQ
- Platform: PlayStation
- Release: NA: September 11, 2000; EU: December 15, 2000
- Genre: Third-person shooter
- Mode: Single-player

Danger Girl is a 2000 third-person shooter video game developed by n-Space and published by THQ. It was released for the PlayStation, and is loosely based on the comic book of the same name. It follows Abbey Chase, Sydney Savage and JC as they battle Major Maxim and Natalia Kassle.

== Gameplay ==
Each girl has specific equipment, mostly limited to differences between the weapons. In overall 12 levels, the goal is to make a way through the terrain that contains a certain numbers of enemies that will block the way. They will actively run and notice when the players step out from hiding. There is no way to save progress during the missions. In case the character dies during a mission, it will restart from the beginning. All levels have interactive puzzle elements with occasional cutscenes.

== Development ==
In 1998, n-Space had acquired exclusive rights to develop a video game based on the Danger Girl comic book. There was no publisher attached at that time as the developing team was working on Duke Nukem: Time to Kill.

== Reception ==
Reception

Aggregate score
Aggregator	Score
Metacritic	43/100

Review scores
Publication	Score
AllGame	1.5/5
Consoles +	10%
Computer and Video Games	3/5
EP Daily	4.5/10
GameRevolution	D
GameSpot	3.9/10
IGN	3.2/10
Jeuxvideo.com	14/20
Official U.S. PlayStation Magazine	2.5/5
Video Games (DE)	(US) 80% (EU) 58%

The game received "generally unfavorable reviews" according to the review aggregation website Metacritic.

The Freshman of GamePro said of the game in one review, "If you're a huge fan of the Danger Girl comic, you might want this game just for some new DG action, but fans of third person action titles probably won't find a lot new about Danger Girl for PlayStation. It's fun enough, but it's definitely not dangerous." (Note: GamePro gave the game three 3.5/5 scores for graphics, sound, and fun factor, and 4/5 for control in one review.) In another GamePro review, Jake The Snake said, "A moderately fun game despite its faults, Danger Girl will appeal only to those who love all things Danger Girl or all third-person shooters. (Note: GamePro gave the game three 3/5 scores for graphics, control, and fun factor, and 4/5 for sound in another review.)

The game was nominated for the "Biggest Disappointment" award at The Electric Playground's Blister Awards 2000, which went to Daikatana.
