= Hardacre Film Festival =

Coordinates: 41.77126°N 91.12343°W

The Hardacre Film Festival was a film festival held annually from 1997-2012 in Tipton, Iowa, United States, and was considered to be Iowa's longest-running film festival at the time. The festival was founded in 1997 by Troy Peters and was typically held in August, showing independent films from all over the world.

== Awards ==
The festival traditionally awards filmmakers in nine categories:

- Best Narrative Feature film
- Best Short film
- Best Documentary film
- Best Student Film
- Best Experimental Film
- Best Animated Film
- Troy Peters Best Iowa Film (named after the festival's founder)
- Audience Award
