= Jordan Jacobo =

American actor and screenwriter

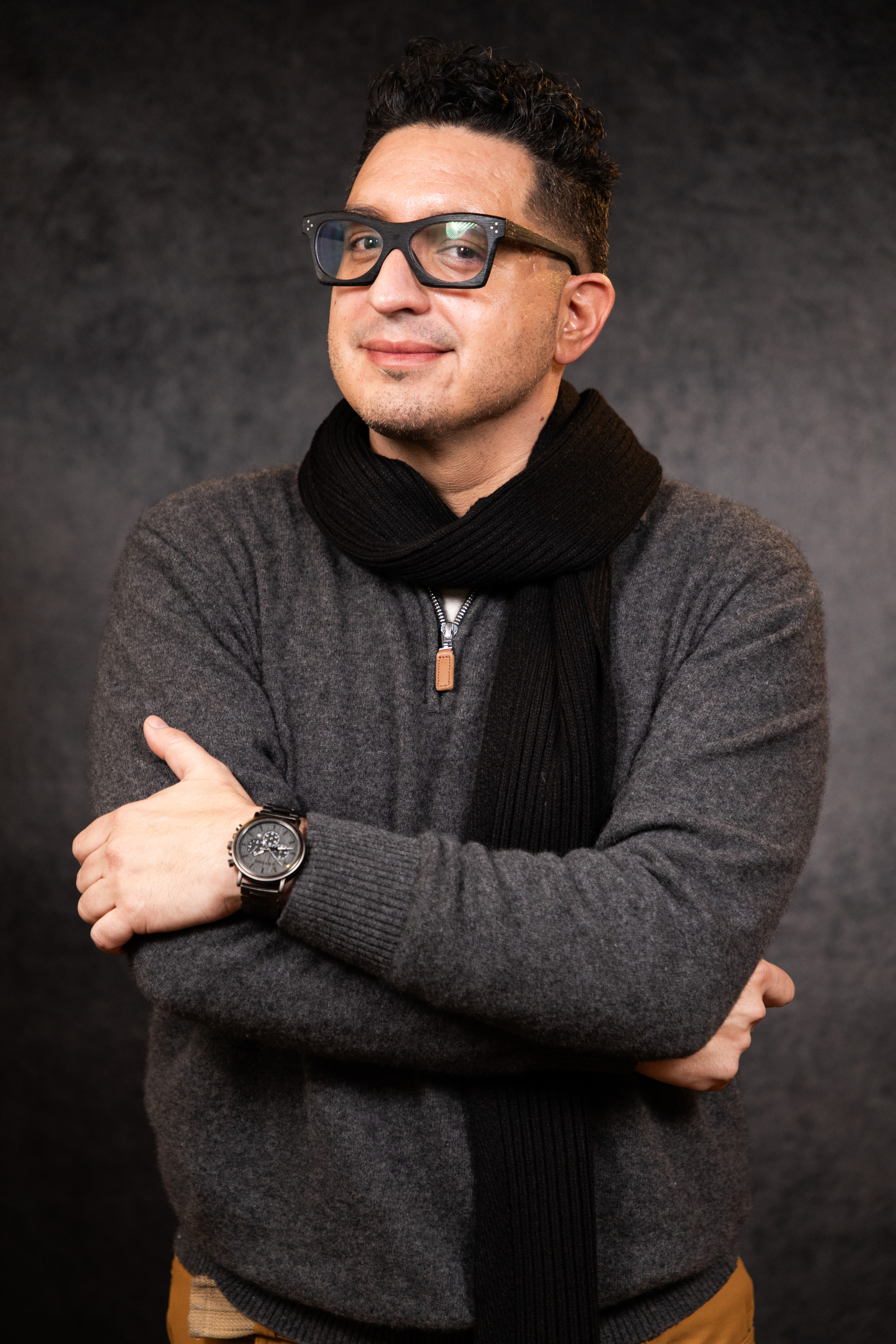
- Jacobo in 2025
- Occupations: Actor; screenwriter; film director
- Known for: Jordan Loves; Long Live Xander the Great; Sides
- Notable credits: Fletcher and Jenks; Why the Nativity?

Jordan Jacobo is an American actor, screenwriter and film director who wrote the film Fletcher and Jenks (2016), wrote the series Jordan Loves (2017) and Sides (2021), and appeared in the films Expect a Miracle: Finding Light in the Darkness of a Pandemic (2020) and Long Live Xander the Great (2023).

== Early life ==
Jacobo was raised in San Ysidro, San Diego, and resides in Imperial Beach, California. His father was part of the National Guard.

== Career ==
In 2017, Jacobo created Jordan Loves on KPBS, a series that covers areas throughout San Diego such as the Coronado Bridge. He had previously made the web series Jordan Hates and wanted to create a show that expressed his cheerful side. In 2018, Jacobo adapted a story from postal carrier Ryan Bradford into a short film called 92115 produced by Mark Atkinson. By 2020, he was co-host of the podcast You're Gonna Die Alone and his play Transit Stop was selected for Old Globe Theatre's Powers New Voices Festival.

Jacobo co-wrote a series called Sides with Michael Lewis Foster in 2021, based on sitcoms from the 1980s and 1990s, that screened at the San Diego Latino Film Festival. In 2023, filmmaker Devin Scott directed the film Long Live Xander the Great, which was loosely based on Jacobo's childhood, and with Jacobo cast as the narrator. The film screened in 2024 at the GI Film Festival San Diego.

Jacobo screened a retrospective film at Digital Gym Cinema in 2024. In 2025, he wrote a screenplay called Quality Trauma Bonding for the 48 Hour Film Project. Jacobo expressed support for the SDC Film Initiative to help the film industry return to San Diego County.

== Filmography ==
Year	Title	Actor	Writer	Director	Role	Notes
2016	Fletcher and Jenks	Yes	Yes	No	Detective	
2017	Jordan Hates the Writing	Yes	Yes	No	Jordan	The Shining parody
2017	Jordan Loves	Yes	Yes	Yes	Himself	Host, 7 episodes
2018	92115	No	Co-adapted	No	—N/a	
2018	To Fall in Love With Anyone, Do This	Yes	No	No	Pizza Delivery Guy	
2019	The Mayflower	Yes	No	No	Cesar	
2020	Expect a Miracle: Finding Light in the Darkness of a Pandemic	Voice	No	No	—N/a	
2020	Panic at Parq	Yes	Lead	No	Jordan	
2020	Leave em' Laughing	Yes	No	No	Wake Up Man	
2021	Shooters	Yes	—N/a	No	Jordan	7 episodes
2021	Sides	Yes	Yes	No	Jordan	10 episodes
2021	Soon Enough / Ya Pronto	No	Yes	Yes	—N/a	
2022	Why the Nativity?	Yes	No	No	Adult Yoram	
2023	Last Chance	Yes	No	No	Detective Diaz	
2023	The Buck Stop	Yes	Yes	Yes	—N/a	Produced by Shannon Taylor, screened at San Diego Latino Film Festival
2023	Long Live Xander the Great	Yes	—N/a	No	Narrator	Voice, fictional work based on Jacobo

== Accolades ==
Festival	Year	Title	Award	Result	Ref.
48 Hour Film Project, San Diego	2016	Fletcher and Jenks	Best Writing	Nominated	
Migrant Voices	2021	Soon Enough / Ya Pronto	Emerging Filmmaker	Finalist	
Migrant Voices	2021	Soon Enough / Ya Pronto	Professional Filmmaker	Finalist	

== You're Gonna Die Alone podcast ==
You're Gonna Die Alone
- Genre: Romantic comedy; celebrity relationships
- Language: English

Cast and voices
- Hosted by: Cristyn Chandler; Jordan Jacobo

Production
- Production: Allie Lennox

Publication
- No. of seasons: 3
- No. of episodes: 45
- Original release: July 2018 – April 2020
- Provider: Libsyn

From 2018 to 2020, Jacobo and Cristyn Chandler hosted a podcast called You're Gonna Die Alone that focused primarily on relationship disasters.
