= Spring Valley, San Diego County, California =

Spring Valley, California
- census-designated place
- Interactive map of Spring Valley, California
- Location in the United States
- Coordinates: 32°44′4″N 116°58′53″W
- Country: United States
- State: California
- County: San Diego

Area
  - Total: 7.376 sq mi (19.105 km^{2})
  - Land: 7.342 sq mi (19.016 km^{2})
  - Water: 0.034 sq mi (0.089 km^{2}) 0.47%
- Elevation: 390 ft (119 m)

Population (2020)
  - Total: 30,998
  - Density: 4,221.9/sq mi (1,630.1/km^{2})
- Time zone: UTC-8 (PST)
  - Summer (DST): UTC-7 (PDT)
- ZIP codes: 91976-91979
- Area code: 619
- FIPS code: 06-73696
- GNIS feature ID: 1661495

Spring Valley is a census-designated place (CDP) in the East County region of San Diego County, California. The population was 30,998 at the 2020 census, up from 28,205 at the 2010 census.

From 1970 through 1990, Spring Valley included what is now the La Presa CDP to the south; La Presa is still popularly considered to be a part of Spring Valley. Extended definitions of Spring Valley may also include the Casa de Oro neighborhood to the north, which belongs to the Casa de Oro-Mount Helix CDP. Locations in both La Presa and Casa de Oro use Spring Valley addresses.

Spring Valley is served by the 91977 and 91978 ZIP Codes.

== History ==
Spring Valley is named for the natural spring located there. It was long the home of the Kumeyaay people, who called it Neti or Meti. Spanish conquerors drove off the natives and used the area for cattle, calling it El aguaje de San Jorge (St. George's Spring).

In 1863, Judge A. S. Ensworth of San Diego filed a claim for a 160-acre (65 ha) ranch that included the spring. The ranch, and the small adobe house he built there, were sold to Rufus King Porter and later to historian Hubert Howe Bancroft. The adobe is now a National Historic Landmark.

== Geography ==
The United States Geological Survey (USGS) places Spring Valley at 32°44′41″N 116°59′56″W (32.7447740, -116.9989160). This is near the intersection of Kenwood Drive and Helix Street. Most maps place Spring Valley at this location.

The United States Census Bureau places Spring Valley at 32°44′4″N 116°58′53″W (32.734318, -116.981372), which is approximately two miles southeast of where the USGS places it. According to the United States Census Bureau, the CDP has a total area of 7.4 square miles (19 km^{2}). 7.3 square miles (19 km^{2}) of it is land and 0.03 square miles (0.078 km^{2}) of it (0.47%) is water.

== Demographics ==
Historical population
Census	Pop.	Note	%±
1970	29,742		—
1980	40,191		35.1%
1990	55,331		37.7%
2000	26,663		−51.8%
2010	28,205		5.8%
2020	30,998		9.9%
U.S. Decennial Census; 1860–1870 1880-1890; 1900 1910 1920; 1930 1940 1950; 1960 1970 1980; 1990 2000 2010; 2020; Part of 1990 census area was lost to La Presa

Spring Valley was listed as an unincorporated place in the 1970 U.S. census; and then as a census designated place in the 1980 U.S. census.

=== Racial and ethnic composition ===
Spring Valley CDP, San Diego County, California – Racial and ethnic composition Note: the US Census treats Hispanic/Latino as an ethnic category. This table excludes Latinos from the racial categories and assigns them to a separate category. Hispanics/Latinos may be of any race.
Race / Ethnicity (NH = Non-Hispanic)	Pop 2000	Pop 2010	Pop 2020	% 2000	% 2010	% 2020
White alone (NH)	15,592	12,924	11,285	58.48%	45.82%	36.41%
Black or African American alone (NH)	2,632	2,984	3,030	9.87%	10.58%	9.77%
Native American or Alaska Native alone (NH)	136	105	77	0.51%	0.37%	0.25%
Asian alone (NH)	1,221	1,586	1,986	4.58%	5.62%	6.41%
Native Hawaiian or Pacific Islander alone (NH)	123	206	196	0.46%	0.73%	0.63%
Other race alone (NH)	83	76	197	0.31%	0.27%	0.64%
Mixed race or Multiracial (NH)	1,150	1,128	1,718	4.31%	4.00%	5.54%
Hispanic or Latino (any race)	5,726	9,196	12,509	21.48%	32.60%	40.35%
Total	26,663	28,205	30,998	100.00%	100.00%	100.00%

=== 2020 ===
The 2020 United States census reported that Spring Valley had a population of 30,998. The population density was 4,222.0 inhabitants per square mile (1,630.1/km^{2}). The racial makeup of Spring Valley was 43.1% White, 10.4% African American, 1.2% Native American, 6.8% Asian, 0.8% Pacific Islander, 19.5% from other races, and 18.1% from two or more races. Hispanic or Latino of any race were 40.4% of the population.

The census reported that 99.1% of the population lived in households, 0.2% lived in non-institutionalized group quarters, and 0.7% were institutionalized.

There were 9,967 households, out of which 38.7% included children under the age of 18, 52.2% were married-couple households, 6.7% were cohabiting couple households, 25.2% had a female householder with no partner present, and 15.9% had a male householder with no partner present. 17.2% of households were one person, and 7.4% were one person aged 65 or older. The average household size was 3.08. There were 7,621 families (76.5% of all households).

The age distribution was 24.4% under the age of 18, 9.1% aged 18 to 24, 27.3% aged 25 to 44, 24.8% aged 45 to 64, and 14.4% who were 65 years of age or older. The median age was 36.9 years. For every 100 females, there were 95.0 males.

There were 10,225 housing units at an average density of 1,392.7 units per square mile (537.7 units/km^{2}), of which 9,967 (97.5%) were occupied. Of these, 62.2% were owner-occupied, and 37.8% were occupied by renters.

In 2023, the US Census Bureau estimated that the median household income was $104,808, and the per capita income was $40,074. About 9.6% of families and 12.0% of the population were below the poverty line.

=== 2010 ===
At the 2010 census Spring Valley had a population of 28,205. The population density was 3,824.9 inhabitants per square mile (1,476.8/km^{2}). The racial makeup of Spring Valley was 10,915 (38.7%) White, 3,449 (11.1%) African American, 237 (0.8%) Native American, 1,766 (5.7%) Asian, 616 (2.0%) Pacific Islander, 5,172 (17.4%) from other races, and 1,828 (6.5%) from two or more races. Hispanic or Latino of any race were 11,201 persons (36.0%).

The census reported that 28,040 people (99.4% of the population) lived in households, 51 (0.2%) lived in non-institutionalized group quarters, and 114 (0.4%) were institutionalized.

There were 9,305 households, 3,854 (41.4%) had children under the age of 18 living in them, 4,940 (53.1%) were opposite-sex married couples living together, 1,514 (16.3%) had a female householder with no husband present, 636 (6.8%) had a male householder with no wife present. There were 560 (6.0%) unmarried opposite-sex partnerships, and 96 (1.0%) same-sex married couples or partnerships. 1,612 households (17.3%) were one person and 560 (6.0%) had someone living alone who was 65 or older. The average household size was 3.01. There were 7,090 families (76.2% of households); the average family size was 3.39.

The age distribution was 7,481 people (26.5%) under the age of 18, 2,819 people (10.0%) aged 18 to 24, 7,496 people (26.6%) aged 25 to 44, 7,461 people (26.5%) aged 45 to 64, and 2,948 people (10.5%) who were 65 or older. The median age was 35.0 years. For every 100 females, there were 95.2 males. For every 100 females age 18 and over, there were 90.6 males.

There were 9,741 housing units at an average density of 1,321.0 per square mile, of the occupied units 5,916 (63.6%) were owner-occupied and 3,389 (36.4%) were rented. The homeowner vacancy rate was 1.9%; the rental vacancy rate was 4.9%. 17,130 people (60.7% of the population) lived in owner-occupied housing units and 10,910 people (38.7%) lived in rental housing units.

== Education ==
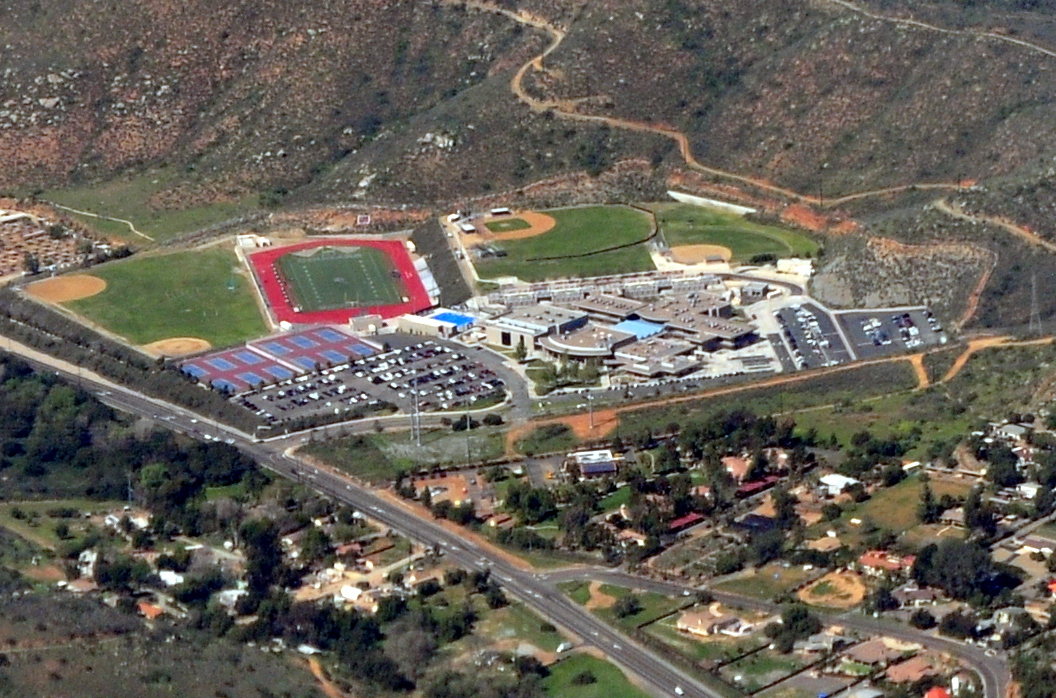
Steele Canyon High School

Public high school education is provided by the Grossmont Union High School District. Elementary and middle schools are operated by the La Mesa-Spring Valley School District.

== Government ==
In the California State Legislature, Spring Valley is in the 39th senatorial district, represented by Democrat Akilah Weber Pierson, and in the 79th Assembly district, represented by Democrat LaShae Sharp-Collins.

In the United States House of Representatives, Spring Valley is included in California's 51st congressional district, represented by Democrat Sara Jacobs.

== Notable people ==
- Hubert Howe Bancroft, historian and ethnologist
- Khalif Barnes, football player
- Andrew Bellatti, baseball player
- Reggie Bush, football player
- Nick Cannon, comedian and actor
- Brooks Conrad, baseball player
- Jean Dawson, musician
- Robert Griffith, football player
- Cory Littleton, football player
- Ogemdi Nwagbuo, NFL Athlete
- Stacey Poon-Kinney, chef
- Cal Rayborn, professional motorcycle racer
- Kobe Sanders, basketball player
- Devin Scott, filmmaker
- Alexandra Slade, actress
- Jeremy Stenberg, motocross rider
- Laulauga Tausaga, discus thrower
- Sebastian Valdez, football player
- Michael Wiley, football player
- Doug Wilkerson, football player
