= Dick Tucker (American football) =

American football coach

Biographical details
- Born: July 4, 1926
- Died: July 26, 2018 (aged 92)

Playing career

Football
- 1946–1950: Whittier
- Position: Quarterback

Coaching career (HC unless noted)

Football
- 1951–1961: Brea Olinda HS (CA)
- 1962–1985: Orange Coast

Head coaching record
- Overall: 129–102–5 (junior college football); 98–18–1 (high school football)
- Bowls: 4–0 (junior college)
- Tournaments: Football; 1–2 (California JC large division division playoffs)

Accomplishments and honors

Championships
- Football; 2 junior college national (1963, 1975); 1 Eastern Conference (1963); 3 SCC (1971, 1974–1975); 2 CIF Southern Section 1-A Division (1959, 1961); 8 Orange League (1953, 1955–1961)

Hal Richard Tucker (July 4, 1926 – July 26, 2018) was an American junior college football coach and athletics administrator. He served as the head football coach at Orange Coast College in Costa Mesa, California from 1962 to 1985, compiling a record of 129–102–5 in 24 seasons. He led the Orange Coast Pirates to two junior college national titles, in 1963 and 1975. Tucker was also the head golf coach and athletic director at Orange Coast.

Tucker played college football at Whittier College from 1946 to 1950 as a quarterback under head coach Wallace Newman. He was the head football coach at Brea Olinda High School in Brea, California from 1951 to 1961, tallying a mark of 96–18–1 in 11 seasons, earning or sharing eight Orange League titles with CIF Southern Section 1-A Division championships in 1959 and 1961.

Tucker died on September 14, 2009, at the age of 92.

== Head coaching record ==
=== Junior college football ===
Year	Team	Overall	Conference	Standing	Bowl/playoffs
Orange Coast Pirates (Eastern Conference) (1962–1967)
1962	Orange Coast	9–1	8–1	2nd	W Orange Show Bowl
1963	Orange Coast	10–0	9–0	1st	W Junior Rose Bowl
1964	Orange Coast	6–4	5–2	T–2nd	W Elks Bowl
1965	Orange Coast	4–5	3–4	5th	
1966	Orange Coast	4–5	4–3	T–2nd	
1967	Orange Coast	6–3	6–2	3rd	
Orange Coast Pirates (South Coast Conference) (1968–1983)
1968	Orange Coast	5–4	3–4	5th	
1969	Orange Coast	6–2–1	3–2–1	4th	
1970	Orange Coast	6–3	5–1	2nd	
1971	Orange Coast	7–2–1	5–1	T–1st	L California JC large division quarterfinal
1972	Orange Coast	6–3	3–2	T–2nd	
1973	Orange Coast	7–3	3–2	T–2nd	
1974	Orange Coast	7–5	4–1	T–1st	L California JC large division semifinal
1975	Orange Coast	11–0	6–0	1st	W Avocado Bowl
1976	Orange Coast	6–4	4–2	2nd	
1977	Orange Coast	5–4–1	3–2–1	3rd	
1978	Orange Coast	7–3	3–3	T–3rd	
1979	Orange Coast	2–8	1–5	5th	
1980	Orange Coast	2–8	1–5	5th	
1981	Orange Coast	3–7	2–4	5th	
1982	Orange Coast	0–10	0–6	7th	
1983	Orange Coast	4–5–1	3–2–1	3rd	
Orange Coast Pirates (Mission Conference) (1984–1985)
1984	Orange Coast	4–6	4–4	4th	
1985	Orange Coast	2–7–1	2–6	8th	
Orange Coast:		129–102–5	90–64–3		
Total:		129–102–5			
National championship Conference title Conference division title or championship game berth

=== High school football ===
Year	Team	Regular Season					Postseason
Year	Team	Won	Lost	Ties	Win %	Finish	Result
1951	Brea Olinda	4	4	0	.500	T-4th in Orange League	No playoffs, did not qualify
1952	Brea Olinda	5	3	0	.625	2nd in Orange League	No playoffs, did not qualify
1953	Brea Olinda	10	1	0	.909	1st in Orange League	CIF-SS Southern Group Semifinalists
1954	Brea Olinda	6	2	1	.722	3rd in Orange League	No playoffs, did not qualify
1955	Brea Olinda	9	2	0	.818	T-1st in Orange League	CIF-SS Southern Group Quarterfinalists
1956	Brea Olinda	11	1	0	.917	1st in Orange League	CIF-SS Southern Group Finalists
1957	Brea Olinda	9	1	0	.900	1st in Orange League	CIF-SS Southern Group Quarterfinalists
1958	Brea Olinda	9	2	0	.818	1st in Orange League	CIF-SS 2-A Division Quarterfinalists
1959	Brea Olinda	11	1	0	.917	T-1st in Orange League	CIF-SS 1-A Division Champions
1960	Brea Olinda	10	1	0	.909	1st in Orange League	CIF-SS 1-A Division Semifinalists
1961	Brea Olinda	12	0	0	1.000	1st in Orange League	CIF-SS 1-A Division Champions
Total		96	18	1	.839		
