= Dutch Elston =

American football player (1918–1989)

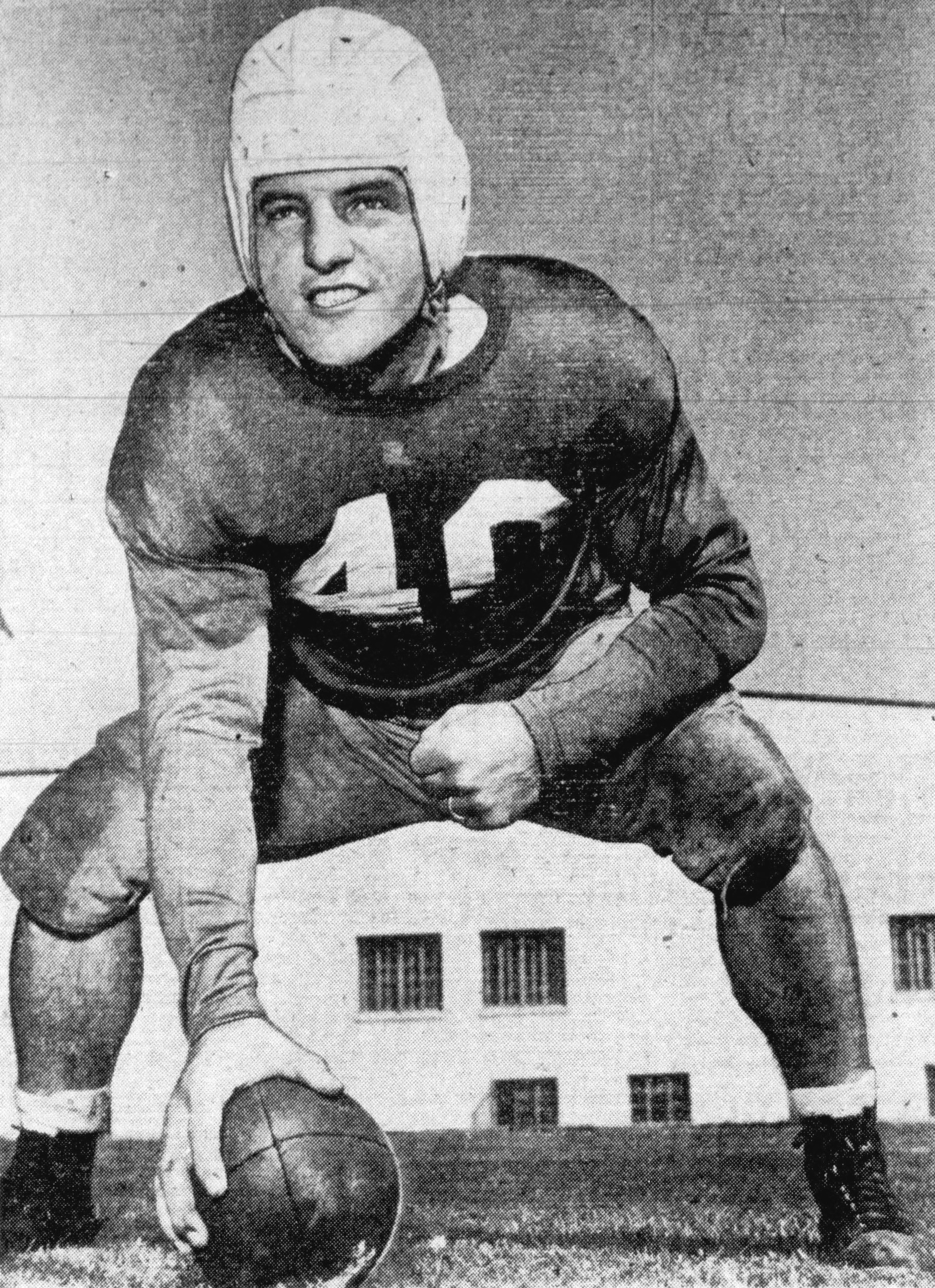
- Elston, c. 1945

No. 55, 21
- Position: Center

Personal information
- Born: November 19, 1918; Texhoma, Texas, U.S.
- Died: September 10, 1989 (aged 70); San Francisco, California, U.S.
- Listed height: 5 ft 11 in (1.80 m)
- Listed weight: 190 lb (86 kg)

Career information
- High school: Waite (Toledo, Ohio)
- College: South Carolina

Career history

Playing
- Cleveland Rams (1942); New York Yankees (1946–1948)

Coaching
- City College of San Francisco (1962–1976) Head coach
- Stats at Pro Football Reference

Arthur Warren "Dutch" Elston (November 19, 1918 – September 10, 1989) was an American football center and football coach.

== Biography ==
Elston was born in Texas in 1918 and attended Morrison R. Waite High School in Toledo, Ohio. He played college football at South Carolina. He served in the United States Army Air Forces during World War II.

He played professional football in the National Football League (NFL) for the Cleveland Rams in 1942 and in the All-America Football Conference (AAFC) for the San Francisco 49ers from 1946 to 1948. He appeared in 45 professional football games, 22 of them as a starter.

After his playing career ended, Elston coached high school football in San Francisco. He was also the head football coach at City College of San Francisco (CCSF) from 1962 to 1976. His players at CCSF included O. J. Simpson.

Elston died of cancer, in 1989, in San Francisco.

== Head coaching record ==
=== Junior college ===
Year	Team	Overall	Conference	Standing	Bowl/playoffs
City College of San Francisco Rams (Golden Gate Conference) (1962–1976)
1962	City College of San Francisco	4–5	3–4	6th	
1963	City College of San Francisco	3–4	3–3	4th	
1964	City College of San Francisco	5–3–1	4–2–1	T–3rd	
1965	City College of San Francisco	8–1–1	6–0–1	1st	W Prune Bowl
1966	City College of San Francisco	9–1	7–0	1st	L Prune Bowl
1967	City College of San Francisco	5–4	5–2	3rd	
1968	City College of San Francisco	7–2	4–2	3rd	
1969	City College of San Francisco	2–7	1–6	8th	
1970	City College of San Francisco		2–5	T–6th	
1971	City College of San Francisco	2–7	2–5	T–5th	
1972	City College of San Francisco	0–9	0–7	8th	
1973	City College of San Francisco	4–5	2–4	6th	
1974	City College of San Francisco	3–7	2–6	T–7th	
1975	City College of San Francisco	3–7	2–6	8th	
1976	City College of San Francisco	6–4	5–3	T–3rd	
City College of San Francisco:			48–55–2		
Total:					
National championship Conference title Conference division title or championship game berth
