= Hal Sherbeck =

American football and baseball coach (1928–2014)

Biographical details
- Born: March 16, 1928; Paynesville, Minnesota, U.S.
- Died: August 10, 2014 (aged 86); Temecula, California, U.S.

Playing career

Football
- 1950–1951: Montana

Basketball
- 1950–1952: Montana

Baseball
- c. 1950: Montana

Coaching career (HC unless noted)

Football
- 1952–1955: Missoula HS (MT)
- 1956–1960: Montana (assistant)
- 1961–1991: Fullerton

Basketball
- 1956–1961: Montana (assistant)

Baseball
- 1956–1961: Montana

Head coaching record
- Overall: 241–70–8 (junior college football); 46–69–1 (college baseball)
- Bowls: 9–4
- Tournaments: Football; 8–3 (California JC large division playoffs)

Accomplishments and honors

Championships
- Football; 3 junior college national (1965, 1967, 1983); 4 Eastern Conference (1964–1967); 9 SCC (1969–1970, 1973–1974, 1976–1977, 1980–1981, 1983); 2 Pac-9 (1984–1985); 1 Mission Conference Central Division (1988)

Harold Embret Sherbeck (March 16, 1928 — August 3, 2014) was an American football and baseball coach. He served as the head football coach at Fullerton College in Fullerton, California from 1961 to 1991, compiling a record of 241–70–8. His teams at Fullerton won three junior college national championships, in 1965, 1967, and 1983. Sherbeck was also the head baseball coach at the University of Montana from 1956 to 1961, tallying a mark of 46–69–1.

Sherbeck was born on March 16, 1928, in Paynesville, Minnesota. The child of Norwegian immigrants, he moved during his youth to Big Sandy, Montana. He died on August 3, 2014, in Temecula, California.

== Head coaching record ==
=== Junior college football ===
Year	Team	Overall	Conference	Standing	Bowl/playoffs
Fullerton Hornets (Eastern Conference) (1961–1967)
1961	Fullerton	6–4	5–2	3rd	L Orange Show Bowl
1962	Fullerton	6–2–1	6–2–1	3rd	
1963	Fullerton	3–5–1	3–5–1	T–6th	
1964	Fullerton	8–2	7–0	1st	W Potato Bowl
1965	Fullerton	10–0	7–0	1st	W Junior Rose Bowl
1966	Fullerton	9–0–1	7–0	1st	W Potato Bowl
1967	Fullerton	12–0	8–0	1st	W California JC large division championship
Fullerton Hornets (South Coast Conference) (1968–1983)
1968	Fullerton	8–1	6–1	2nd	
1969	Fullerton	10–2	5–1	1st	L California JC large division championship
1970	Fullerton	11–1	6–0	1st	L California JC large division championship
1971	Fullerton	5–4	4–2	3rd	
1972	Fullerton	4–4–1	2–2–1	4th	
1973	Fullerton	10–1	5–0	1st	L California JC large division semifinal
1974	Fullerton	5–3–1	4–1	T–1st	
1975	Fullerton	7–2	5–1	2nd	
1976	Fullerton	9–2	5–1	1st	W Avocado Bowl
1977	Fullerton	10–1	6–0	1st	L Avocado Bowl
1978	Fullerton	6–4	3–3	T–3rd	
1979	Fullerton	7–3	4–2	2nd	
1980	Fullerton	7–4	5–1	T–1st	W Avocado Bowl
1981	Fullerton	9–1	5–1	T–1st	
1982	Fullerton	9–2	5–1	2nd	W Pony Bowl
1983	Fullerton	10–0–1	5–0–1	1st	W Potato Bowl
Fullerton Hornets (Pac-9 Conference) (1984–1985)
1984	Fullerton	10–1	7–1	T–1st	W Pony Bowl
1985	Fullerton	8–3	7–1	1st	L Pony Bowl
Fullerton Hornets (South Coast Conference) (1986–1987)
1986	Fullerton	6–4	5–2	T–2nd	
1987	Fullerton	5–3–2	4–1–2	2nd	
Fullerton Hornets (Mission Conference) (1988–1991)
1988	Fullerton	10–1	5–0	1st (Central)	L Potato Bowl
1989	Fullerton	6–4	3–2	3rd (Central)	
1990	Fullerton	7–3	2–3	T–4th (Central)	
1991	Fullerton	8–3	7–2 / 3–2	T–2nd (Central)	W Potato Bowl
Fullerton:		241–70–8	158–38–6		
Total:		241–70–8			
National championship Conference title Conference division title or championship game berth
