= Dave Ogas =

American football player (born 1946)

No. 61, 53
- Positions: Linebacker, offensive lineman

Personal information
- Born: July 23, 1946 (age 80); Silver City, New Mexico, U.S.
- Listed height: 6 ft 1 in (1.85 m)
- Listed weight: 225 lb (102 kg)

Career information
- High school: La Habra (La Habra, California)
- College: Fullteron, San Diego State
- NFL draft: 1968: undrafted

Career history

Playing
- Oakland Raiders (1968); Buffalo Bills (1969)

Coaching
- Mount Miguel HS (CA) (1974–1975) Head coach; Santa Ana Dons (1976–1981) Offensive line coach; Santa Ana (1982–2001) Head coach
- Stats at Pro Football Reference

Dave Ogas (born July 23, 1946) is an American former football player and coach. He played professionally as a linebacker in the American Football League (AFL) with the Oakland Raiders in 1968 and the Buffalo Bills in 1969. Ogas served as the head football coach at Santa Ana College in Santa Ana, California from 1982 to 2001.

Ogas played football as an offensive lineman for two seasons at Fullerton College in Fullerton, California and was a member of the 1965 Fullerton Hornets football team coached by Hal Sherbeck that won the Junior Rose Bowl and a junior college national champion. He graduated from San Diego State University in 1971 and earned a master's degree from Azusa Pacific College in 1976.

Ogas was an assistant football coach at Mission Bay High School in San Diego and head coach Mount Miguel High School in Spring Valley, California, where he led his teams to a record of 9–9 in two seasons. He was the offensive line coach at Santa Ana for six years before succeeding Tim Mills as head coach.

== Head coaching record ==
=== Junior college ===
Year	Team	Overall	Conference	Standing	Bowl/playoffs
Santa Ana / Rancho Santiago Dons (Mission Conference) (1982–2001)
1982	Santa Ana	3–7	2–4	5th	
1983	Santa Ana	4–6	3–3	4th	
1984	Santa Ana	6–4	6–2	3rd	
1985	Rancho Santiago	5–5	3–5	T–6th	
1986	Rancho Santiago	6–4	5–4	T–4th	
1987	Rancho Santiago	4–6	3–6	T–7th	
1988	Rancho Santiago	7–3–1	5–3–1 / 2–3	T–3rd (Central)	W Pony Bowl Classic
1989	Rancho Santiago	10–1	8–1	2nd (Central)	W Orange County Bowl
1990	Rancho Santiago	5–5	2–3	T–4th (Central)	
1991	Rancho Santiago	2–8	1–8 / 1–4	T–5th (Central)	
1992	Rancho Santiago	3–7	2–7 / 2–3	T–3rd (Central)	
1993	Rancho Santiago	4–5–1	2–3	T–3rd (Central)	
1994	Rancho Santiago	9–2	6–0	1st (Central)	L Orange County Bowl
1995	Rancho Santiago	6–5	4–2	T–2nd (Central)	L Strawberry Bowl
1996	Rancho Santiago	6–4	6–4 / 4–2	T–2nd (Central)	
1997	Santa Ana	8–3	7–3 / 6–0	1st (Central)	W Charity Bowl
1998	Santa Ana	4–6	4–6 / 4–1	2nd (Central)	
1999	Santa Ana	7–4	4–1	T–1st (Central)	L Strawberry Bowl
2000	Santa Ana	2–8	2–3	T–4th (Central)	
2001	Santa Ana	3–7	1–4	T–4th (Central)	
Santa Ana / Rancho Santiago:		104–100–2			
Total:		104–100–2			
National championship Conference title Conference division title or championship game berth
