= Chuck Bowman (American football) =

American football coach, athletic administrator

Playing career
- 1957: Oklahoma
- Positions: Center, linebacker

Coaching career (HC unless noted)
- 1958: Shawnee HS (OK) (assistant)
- 1959–1963: Tulsa Central HS (OK) (assistant)
- 1964–1966: McLain HS (OK)
- 1967–1971: Northeastern Oklahoma A&M

Administrative career (AD unless noted)
- 1964–1967: McLain HS (OK)
- 1967–1972: Northeastern Oklahoma A&M

Head coaching record
- Overall: 40–8 (junior college football); 15–14–2 (high school football)
- Bowls: 3–0 (junior college)

Accomplishments and honors

Championships
- Football; 2 NJCAA National (1967, 1969); 1 OJCC (1967)

Charles G. Bowman is an American former football coach and athletics administrator. He served as the head football coach at Northeastern Oklahoma A&M College in Miami, Oklahoma from 1967 to 1971 compiling a record of 40–8 and leading his teams to two NJCAA National Football Championships, in 1967 and 1969. Bowman was also the athletic director at Northeastern Oklahoma A&M from 1967 to 1972.

Bowman attended Ponca City High School in Ponca City, Oklahoma, where he played football as a tackle. He then played college football at the University of Oklahoma as a center and linebacker under head coach Bud Wilkinson. He earned bachelor's and master's degrees from Oklahoma.

Bowman began his coaching career in 1958 at Shawnee High School in Shawnee, Oklahoma as an assistant coach under his brother, Dick Bowman. The next year, he moved onto Central High School in Tulsa, Oklahoma as an assistant football and wrestling coach. He was also the head track coach at Tulsa Central before succeeding John Payne as head football coach and athletic director at Tulsa's McLain High School in 1964. Bowman led McLain to a record of 15–14–2 in three seasons, from 1964 to 1966. He was hired as head football coach at athletic director at Northeastern Oklahoma A&M in 1967, succeeding Red Robertson. Bowman resigned from his position at Northeastern Oklahoma A&M in 1972 to take a job with Hilco Management Corporation, an owner and operator of apartment complexes and shopping malls in Dallas. He was succeeded as head football coach by Reuben Berry.

== Head coaching record ==
=== Junior college football ===
Year	Team	Overall	Conference	Standing	Bowl/playoffs
Northeastern Oklahoma A&M Golden Norsemen (Oklahoma Junior College Conference) (1967)
1967	Northeastern Oklahoma A&M	9–1	2–0	1st	W Shrine Bowl
Northeastern Oklahoma A&M Golden Norsemen (Independent) (1968–1971)
1968	Northeastern Oklahoma A&M	5–4			
1969	Northeastern Oklahoma A&M	10–0			W Shrine Bowl
1970	Northeastern Oklahoma A&M	8–1			
1971	Northeastern Oklahoma A&M	8–2			W Green Country Bowl
Northeastern Oklahoma A&M:		40–8	2–0		
Total:		40–8			
National championship Conference title Conference division title or championship game berth
