= Ray Ross =

Ray Ross may refer to:

- Ray Ross (ice hockey) (born 1932), Canadian ice hockey player
- Ray Ross (footballer, born 1900) (1900–?), Australian rules footballer for Essendon
- Ray Ross (footballer, born 1903) (1903–1981), Australian rules footballer for Richmond and St Kilda

== See also ==
- Ray Rossi, New Jersey radio personality
- Ray Rosso (1916–2012), Italian-born American football coach
