= 1940 Santa Ana Dons football team =

American college football season

1940 Santa Ana Dons football

Junior college national champion Eastern Conference champion
- Conference: Eastern Conference
- Record: 11–0 (5–0 Eastern)
- Head coach: Bill Cook (14th season)
- Home stadium: Santa Ana Municipal Bowl

1940 Eastern Conference (California) football standings
	Conf.					Overall
Team	W		L		T	W		L		T
Santa Ana $	5	–	0	–	0	11	–	0	–	0
Fullerton	3	–	2	–	0	7	–	2	–	0
Chaffey	2	–	3	–	0	?	–	?	–	?
Riverside	2	–	3	–	0	?	–	?	–	?
San Bernardino	2	–	3	–	0	4	–	6	–	0
Pomona Junior College	1	–	4	–	0	?	–	?	–	?
$ – Conference champion

The 1940 Santa Ana Dons football team was an American football team that represented Santa Ana College as a member of the Eastern Conference during the 1940 college football season. In their 14th year under head coach Bill Cook, the Dons compiled a perfect 11–0 record (5–0 in conference games), won the Eastern Conference championship, held 10 of their opponents to seven or fewer points, and outscored all opponents by a total of 317 to 41. The Los Angeles Times referred to the team as "one of the greatest junior college teams ever developed in the Southland."

Santa Ana was rated as the No. 1 junior college football team in the country in the final rankings issued in December 1940 by the All-American Gridiron Index. Santa Ana received 509 points, edging Louisiana State University's Northeast Center Junior College and Kilgore College which received 499 and 492 points, respectively. The Louisiana school challenged Santa Ana to a post-season game; Santa Ana officials favored the game, but the Southern California Conference refused to lift its rule banning post-season games.

Ten Santa Ana players received first-team honors on one or more of the 1940 Eastern Conference all-conference teams selected by The San Bernardino Sun (SBS), the Helms Athletic Foundation (HAF), and the sports editors of the six school newspapers (SE). Santa Ana's first-team honorees were: fullback Bob Bryant (SBS/HAF/SE); back Earl Parsons (SBS); quarterback/halfback Hal Lilley (HAF/SE); blocker Frank Minisi (HAF); ends Dick Gunther (SBS) and Bob Shildmeyer (HAF/SE); tackles Paul Sedar (SBS/HAF/SE) and Jim Crowther (SBS/SE); guard Bill Noble (SBS/HAF); and center Lester McKnight (SBS/HAF).

The team played its home games at the Santa Ana Municipal Bowl in Santa Ana, California.

== Schedule ==
Date	Opponent	Site	Result	Attendance	Source
September 21	Loyola (CA) freshmen*	Santa Ana Municipal Bowl; Santa Ana, CA	W 13–0		
September 27	Santa Monica*	Santa Ana Municipal Bowl; Santa Ana, CA	W 32–0		
October 4	Pasadena*	Santa Ana Municipal Bowl; Santa Ana, CA	W 13–6	7,500–10,000	
October 11	at San Mateo*	Burlingame High School field; Burlingame, CA	W 20–0		
October 18	Chaffey	Santa Ana Municipal Bowl; Santa Ana, CA	W 26–0		
October 30 (Note: The game was originally scheduled for Friday, October 25. The original date was a rainout and was rescheduled for the following Wednesday, October 30.)	at Riverside	Wheelock Stadium; Riverside, CA	W 27–3		
November 2	Oceanside*	Santa Ana Municipal Bowl; Santa Ana, CA	W 39–13		
November 8	Pomona Junior College	Santa Ana Municipal Bowl; Santa Ana, CA	W 59–6	5,500	
November 15	San Bernardino	Santa Ana Municipal Bowl; Santa Ana, CA	W 40–0		
November 21	at Fullerton	Fullerton, CA	W 14–7		
November 29	Santa Rosa*	Santa Ana Municipal Bowl; Santa Ana, CA	W 34–6	6,000	
*Non-conference game
