= Red Robertson =

American football coach, athletic administrator

Biographical details
- Born: January 27, 1911; Cherryvale, Kansas, U.S.
- Died: November 15, 1987 (aged 76); Tulsa, Oklahoma, U.S.

Playing career

Football
- 1928–1931: Drake
- Positions: Center, guard

Coaching career (HC unless noted)

Football
- 1932–1933: Milton HS (IA)
- 1934–1940: Wewoka HS (OK)
- 1945–1966: Northeastern Oklahoma A&M

Basketball
- 1934–1941: Wewoka HS (OK)
- 1945–1957: Northeastern Oklahoma A&M

Administrative career (AD unless noted)
- 1945–1967: Northeastern Oklahoma A&M

Head coaching record
- Overall: 162–49–7 (junior college football); 128–91 (junior college basketball)

Accomplishments and honors

Championships
- Football; 1 NJCAA National (1959); 10 OJCC (1947–1949, 1951, 1953, 1956–1959, 1962)

Samuel Albert "Red" 'Robertson (January 27, 1911 – November 15, 1987) was an American football and basketball coach and college athletics administrator. He served as the head football coach at Northeastern Oklahoma A&M College in Miami, Oklahoma from 1945 to 1966 compiling a record of 162–49–7. He led his 1959 team to a NJCAA National Football Championship. Robertson was also the head basketball coach at Northeastern Oklahoma A&M from 1945 to 1957, tallying a mark of 128–91, and the school's athletic director from 1945 to 1967.

A native of Cherryvale, Kansas, Robertson graduated from Coffeyville High School in Coffeyville, Kansas. He attended Drake University, where he played college football. He later earned a master's degree from Oklahoma Agricultural and Mechanical College—now known as Oklahoma State University. Robertson began his coaching career in 1932 at Milton High School in Milton, Iowa, where he led his teams to consecutive one-loss seasons. In 1934, he was hired as head football coach and assistant basketball coach at Wewoka High School in Wewoka, Oklahoma.

Robertson suffered a heart attack the day before Northeastern Oklahoma A&M's opened game of the 1966 season. Assistant coach Jack Wallace took over as interim head coach and led the team to an 8–1–1 record. In early 1967, Robertson was succeeded by Chuck Bowman as athletic director and head football coach.

Robertson died on November 15, 1987, at a hospital in Tulsa, Oklahoma.

== Head coaching record ==
=== Junior college football ===
Year	Team	Overall	Conference	Standing	Bowl/playoffs
Northeastern Oklahoma Norsemen / Northeastern Oklahoma A&M Golden Norsemen (Oklahoma Junior College Conference) (1945–1963)
1945	Northeastern Oklahoma	4–3			
1946	Northeastern Oklahoma	6–4	4–2	3rd	
1947	Northeastern Oklahoma	9–3	4–2	T–2nd (Note: In January 1948, Cameron forfeited the conference title because of an ineligible player. Connors and Northeastern Oklahoma, tied for second place, were named co-champions.)	W Papoose Bowl
1948	Northeastern Oklahoma	7–3	4–1	1st	W Salt Bowl
1949	Northeastern Oklahoma	7–3	4–1	1st	
1950	Northeastern Oklahoma	3–4–2	2–1–2	3rd	
1951	Northeastern Oklahoma	9–1	5–0	1st	L Texas Rose Bowl
1952	Northeastern Oklahoma	9–1		2nd	
1953	Northeastern Oklahoma A&M	9–1	6–0	1st	L Junior Rose Bowl
1954	Northeastern Oklahoma A&M	7–3	4–1	3rd	
1955	Northeastern Oklahoma A&M	7–2–1	5–2	3rd	
1956	Northeastern Oklahoma A&M	5–3–1	5–1	1st	
1957	Northeastern Oklahoma A&M	9–0	4–0	1st	
1958	Northeastern Oklahoma A&M	9–1	4–0	1st	L Junior Rose Bowl
1959	Northeastern Oklahoma A&M	9–1–1	4–0	1st	W NJCAA championship
1960	Northeastern Oklahoma A&M	8–2	4–1	2nd	
1961	Northeastern Oklahoma A&M	7–3	4–1	2nd	
1962	Northeastern Oklahoma A&M	8–1–1	2–0	1st	
Northeastern Oklahoma A&M Golden Norsemen (Independent) (1963–1966)
1963	Northeastern Oklahoma A&M	9–1			L Junior Rose Bowl
1964	Northeastern Oklahoma A&M	7–2			
1965	Northeastern Oklahoma A&M	6–4			
1966	Northeastern Oklahoma A&M	8–1–1			
Northeastern Oklahoma / Northeastern Oklahoma A&M:		162–49–7			
Total:		162–49–7			
National championship Conference title Conference division title or championship game berth
