= 1967 Fullerton Hornets football team =

American college football season

1967 Fullerton Hornets football

Junior college national champion California JC large division champion

California JC large division championship game, W 41–0 vs. American River
- Conference: Eastern Conference
- Record: 12–0 (8–0 Eastern)
- Head coach: Hal Sherbeck (7th season)
- Home stadium: Fullerton Stadium, La Palma Stadium

1967 Eastern Conference (California) football standings
| | Conf. | | | | | Overall |
| Team | W | | L | | T | W | | L | | T |
|---|---|---|---|---|---|---|---|---|---|---|
| Fullerton $^ | 8 | – | 0 | – | 0 | 12 | – | 0 | – | 0 |
| Mt. San Antonio | 7 | – | 1 | – | 0 | 7 | – | 2 | – | 0 |
| Orange Coast | 6 | – | 2 | – | 0 | 6 | – | 3 | – | 0 |
| Golden West | 4 | – | 4 | – | 0 | 5 | – | 4 | – | 0 |
| Santa Ana | 4 | – | 4 | – | 0 | 5 | – | 4 | – | 0 |
| San Bernardino | 3 | – | 5 | – | 0 | 3 | – | 6 | – | 0 |
| Riverside | 3 | – | 5 | – | 0 | 4 | – | 5 | – | 0 |
| Cypress | 1 | – | 7 | – | 0 | 1 | – | 8 | – | 0 |
| Chaffey | 0 | – | 8 | – | 0 | 0 | – | 9 | – | 0 |
$ – Conference champion; ^ – California state junior college large division playoff participant

The 1967 Fullerton Hornets football team was an American football team that represented Fullerton College as a member of the Eastern Conference during the 1967 junior college football season. Led by seventh-year head coach Hal Sherbeck, the Hornets compiled a perfect 12–0 record (8–0 in conference games), won the Eastern Conference championship and the California junior college championship, and outscored opponents by a total of 394 to 74. They extended their winning streak to 40 games, dating back to the 1964 season, and were selected by J. C. Grid-Wire as the national junior college champion for 1967.

Freshman Jim Fassel was the quarterback. Fassel later played and coached in the National Football League.

== Schedule ==
| Date | Opponent | Site | Result | Attendance | Source |
|---|---|---|---|---|---|
| September 16 | Pasadena* | La Palma Stadium; Anaheim, CA | W 36–6 | | |
| September 23 | at Mt. San Antonio | Walnut, CA | W 34–7 | | |
| October 7 | Riverside | | W 15–0 | | |
| October 14 | at Santa Ana | Santa Ana, CA | W 34–7 | | |
| October 22 | Chaffey | La Palma Stadium; Anaheim, CA | W 46–13 | | |
| October 27 | at Golden West | | W 13–7 | | |
| November 4 | vs. Orange Coast | Anaheim Stadium; Anaheim, CA | W 39–7 | | |
| November 10 | at San Bernardino | Orange Show Stadium; San Bernardino, CA | W 13–0 | 3,500 | |
| November 18 | Cypress | Fullerton Stadium; Fullerton, CA | W 68–8 | | |
| November 25 | vs. San Diego City College* | Anaheim Stadium; Anaheim, CA (California state junior college large division first round) | W 41–6 | 7,444 | |
| December 2 | at Bakersfield* | Bakersfield, CA (California state junior college large division semifinal) | W 14–13 | 16,303 | |
| December 9 | vs. American River* | Anaheim Stadium; Anaheim, CA (California state junior college large division championship game) | W 41–0 | 10,653 | |
*Non-conference game
