= Bill Cook (American football) =

American football player and coach (1915–2000)

Biographical details
- Born: c. 1904
- Died: March 31, 1976 (aged 71); Santa Ana, California, U.S.

Playing career
- 1924–1925: USC
- Position: Quarterback

Coaching career (HC unless noted)
- 1926: USC (freshmen backfield)
- 1927–1952: Santa Ana

Administrative career (AD unless noted)
- ?–1958: Santa Ana

Head coaching record
- Overall: 164–68–26

Accomplishments and honors

Championships
- 2 junior college national (1940, 1942); 11 Eastern Conference (1933–1934, 1936–1937, 1940–1942, 1945, 1948–1950)

Andrew J. "Bill" Cook (c. 1904 – March 31, 1976) was an American junior college football coach. He served as the head football coach at Santa Ana College in Santa Ana, California from 1927 to 1952, compiling a record of 164–68–26. He led his teams at Santa Ana to two junior college national championships, in 1940 and 1942.

Cook graduated from Anaheim High School, in Anaheim, California, in 1922. He attended the University of Southern California (USC), where he played football and was a member of the track and field team. Cooked was the backfield coach for USC's freshman football team in 1926.

Cook died at age 71, on March 31, 1976, at South Coast Community Hospital in Santa Ana, after suffering a heart attack.

== Head coaching record ==
Year	Team	Overall	Conference	Standing	Bowl/playoffs
Santa Ana Dons (Southern California Junior College Conference) (1927–1931)
1927	Santa Ana	6–2–1	4–3	4th	
1928	Santa Ana	3–4–2	1–2–2	4th (Western)	
1929	Santa Ana	7–3–1	6–1	1st	
1930	Santa Ana	4–4–2	2–2–2	T–3rd (Western)	
1931	Santa Ana	3–5–2	1–4–1	6th (Western)	
Santa Ana Dons (Orange Empire / Eastern Conference) (1932–1942)
1932	Santa Ana	7–4	2–4	6th	
1933	Santa Ana	7–1–3	5–1	1st	
1934	Santa Ana	5–3–3	3–0–3	T–1st	
1935	Santa Ana	4–6	3–3	T–3rd	
1936	Santa Ana	10–1	6–0	1st	
1937	Santa Ana	10–0–2	5–0–1	T–1st	
1938	Santa Ana	3–3–5	1–2–3	T–4th	
1939	Santa Ana	7–4	4–1	2nd	
1940	Santa Ana	11–0	5–0	1st	
1941	Santa Ana	10–1	4–0	1st	
1942	Santa Ana	9–0	4–0	1st	
Santa Ana Dons (State) (1943–1944)
1943	No team				
1944	Santa Ana	2–6–1	2–3–1	T–3rd	
Santa Ana Dons (Eastern Conference) (1945–1952)
1945	Santa Ana	7–0	6–0	1st	
1946	Santa Ana	8–3	2–3	4th	
1947	Santa Ana	5–5	2–3	4th	
1948	Santa Ana	10–1	6–0	1st	
1949	Santa Ana	9–1–1	6–0	1st	
1950	Santa Ana	6–2–2	5–0	1st	
1951	Santa Ana	5–5	4–2	T–2nd	
1952	Santa Ana	6–4–1	3–3	T–4th	
Santa Ana:		164–68–26	92–27–13		
Total:		164–68–26			
National championship Conference title Conference division title or championship game berth
