= Homer Beatty =

American football player and coach (1915–2000)

Home Beatty
Biographical details
- Born: August 31, 1915; Maricopa, California, U.S.
- Died: March 16, 2000 (aged 84); Long Beach, California, U.S.

Playing career
- 1934–1936: USC
- 1942: Santa Ana AAB
- Position: Halfback

Coaching career (HC unless noted)
- 1940–1945: Porterville HS (CA)
- 1946–1952: Bakersfield HS (CA)
- 1953–1958: Bakersfield
- 1959–1962: Santa Ana
- 1963–1965: Los Angeles State / Cal State Los Angeles
- 1967–1968: Orange County Ramblers

Head coaching record
- Overall: 21–3 (professional); 25–2 (college); 83–14–3 (junior college)
- Bowls: 1–0 (college); 4–0 (junior college)

Accomplishments and honors

Championships
- 1 junior college national (1962); 1 small college national (1964); 3 CCAA (1963–1965); 2 Metropolitan Conference (1953, 1956); 2 Eastern Conference (1961–1962)

Homer Taylor Beatty (August 31, 1915 – March 16, 2000) was an American football player and coach best known for his coaching success at the junior college, college, and professional levels in central and southern California.

He served as the head football coach at California State University, Los Angeles—renamed from Los Angeles State College of Applied Arts and Sciences in 1963—from 1963 to 1965, compiling a record of 25–2. He later returned to Cal State L.A. in the role of athletic director in 1969 and ’70 when the university moved into the major college ranks as a founding member of the Pacific Coast Athletic Association.

At the professional level, Beatty served as head coach of the Orange County Ramblers of the Continental Football League for the entirety of their two year existence. He led the club to back-to-back Pacific Division titles and was named COFL co-Coach of the Year in 1967.

Beatty died at the age of 84, on March 16, 2000, at St. Mary's Hospital in Long Beach, California.

== Head coaching record ==
=== College ===
Year	Team	Overall	Conference	Standing	Bowl/playoffs
Los Angeles State / Cal State Los Angeles Diablos (California Collegiate Athletic Association) (1963–1965)
1963	Los Angeles State	7–1	3–1	1st	
1964	Cal State Los Angeles	9–0	5–0	1st	
1965	Cal State Los Angeles	9–1	5–0	1st	W Camellia Bowl
Los Angeles State / Cal State Los Angeles:		25–2	13–1		
Total:		25–2			
National championship Conference title Conference division title or championship game berth

=== Junior college ===
Year	Team	Overall	Conference	Standing	Bowl/playoffs
Bakersfield Renegades (Metropolitan Conference) (1953–1958)
1953	Bakersfield	12–0	7–0	1st	W Junior Rose Bowl
1954	Bakersfield	9–1	6–1	2nd	
1955	Bakersfield	10–1–1	5–1–1	2nd	W Potato Bowl
1956	Bakersfield	6–3	5–2	1st	
1957	Bakersfield	8–1–1	5–1–1	2nd	W Potato Bowl
1958	Bakersfield	9–1	6–1	2nd	
Bakersfield:		54–7–2	34–6–2		
Santa Ana Dons (Eastern Conference) (1959–1962)
1959	Santa Ana	6–3	5–2	2nd	
1960	Santa Ana	6–3	5–2	T–2nd	
1961	Santa Ana	7–1–1	6–0–1	1st	
1962	Santa Ana	10–0	9–0	1st	W Junior Rose Bowl
Santa Ana:		29–7–1	25–4–1		
Total:		83–14–3			
National championship Conference title Conference division title or championship game berth

=== Continental Football League ===
Team	Year	Regular season					Postseason			
Team	Year	Won	Lost	Ties	Win %	Finish	Won	Lost	Win %	Result
OC	1967	10	2	0	.833	1st in CoFL Pacific	0	1	.000	Lost to Orlando Panthers in COFL Championship Game, 38–14
OC	1968	11	1	0	.917	1st in CoFL Pacific	0	1	.000	Lost to Orlando Panthers in COFL Championship Game, 51–10
Total		21	3	0	.875		0	2	.000	
