= Ray Rosso =

American football coach

Biographical details
- Born: 1916; Turin, Italy
- Died: December 1, 2012; Newport Beach, California, U.S.

Playing career
- 1938–1939: California

Coaching career (HC unless noted)
- 1946–1947: Chaffey
- 1948–1955: Orange Coast

Head coaching record
- Bowls: 1–0

Accomplishments and honors

Championships
- 3 Eastern Conference (1946–1947, 1951)

Ray Rosso (1916 – December 1, 2012) was an Italian-born American football coach. He served as the head football coach at Chaffey College in Rancho Cucamonga, California from 1946 to 1947 and Orange Coast College (OCC) in Costa Mesa, California from 1948 to 1955.

Rossi was born in Turin, in 1916, and later immigrated with his family to Oakland, California. He served as a fighter pilot and flight instructor in the United States Navy during World War II. Rosso played college football at the University of California, Berkeley. Rosso died on December 1, 2012 at his home in Newport Beach, California.

== Head coaching record ==
=== Junior college football ===
Year	Team	Overall	Conference	Standing	Bowl/playoffs
Chaffey Panthers (Eastern Conference) (1948–1955)
1946	Chaffey		4–0–1	1st	
1947	Chaffey	10–1	4–1	T–1st	W Junior Rose Bowl
Chaffey:			8–1–1		
Orange Coast Pirates (Eastern Conference) (1948–1955)
1948	Orange Coast	3–5–1	2–4	5th	
1949	Orange Coast	8–2	4–2	3rd	
1950	Orange Coast	3–6–1	1–4–1	6th	
1951	Orange Coast	7–3	6–0	1st	
1952	Orange Coast	7–3	4–2	T–2nd	
1953	Orange Coast	6–4	3–3	4th	
1954	Orange Coast	0–10	0–6	7th	
1955	Orange Coast	3–5–1	3–3	3rd	
Orange Coast:		37–38–3	23–24–1		
Total:					
National championship Conference title Conference division title or championship game berth
