= Don Davis (defensive tackle) =

American football player (1943–2018)

No. 76
- Position: Defensive tackle

Personal information
- Born: December 16, 1943 (age 82); Santa Ana, California, U.S.
- Listed height: 6 ft 6 in (1.98 m)
- Listed weight: 285 lb (129 kg)

Career information
- High school: Santa Ana
- College: Santa Ana (1962–1963); Los Angeles State (1964–1965)
- NFL draft: 1966: 2nd round, 25th overall pick
- AFL draft: 1966: 1st round, 7th overall pick

Career history
- New York Giants (1966–1967)

Awards and highlights
- Junior college national champion (1962)

Career NFL statistics
- Sacks: 3.5
- Stats at Pro Football Reference

Donald Earl Davis (born December 16, 1943) is an American former professional football player who was a defensive tackle for one season with the New York Giants of the National Football League (NFL). He was selected by the Giants in the second round of the 1966 NFL draft after playing college football for the Cal State Los Angeles Diablos.

== Early life ==
Donald Earl Davis was born on December 16, 1943, in Santa Ana, California. He attended Santa Ana High School in Santa Ana.

== College career ==
Davis first played college football for the Santa Ana Dons of Santa Ana College from 1962 to 1963. The 1962 Dons went 10–0 and were named national junior college champions. He transferred to play for the Los Angeles State Diablos of California State College at Los Angeles from 1964 to 1965. He played in the Chicago Charities College All-Star Game after his senior season.

== Professional career ==
Davis was selected by the San Diego Chargers in the first round, with the 7th overall pick, of the 1966 AFL draft and by the New York Giants in the second round, with the 25th overall pick, of the 1966 NFL draft. He chose to sign with the Giants. He was given the nickname "Buddha" while at Giants training camp in 1966 because he reportedly looked like a "glob" when he sat with his legs folded underneath him. Davis played in all 14 games, starting 11, for the team during the 1966 season, recording 3.5 sacks. He had a fight with Bookie Bolin at Giants training camp in 1967. Davis was placed on injured reserve later in 1967 and spent the entire season there. He was released in 1968.
