= 1969 Northeastern Oklahoma A&M Golden Norsemen football team =

American college football season

1969 Northeastern Oklahoma A&M Golden Norsemen football

Junior college national champion

Shrine Bowl, W 20–6 vs. Arizona Western
- Conference: Independent
- Record: 10–0
- Head coach: Chuck Bowman (3rd season)
- Home stadium: Robertson Field

The 1969 Northeastern Oklahoma A&M Golden Norsemen football team was an American football team that represented Northeastern Oklahoma A&M College (NEO) during the 1969 junior college football season. In their third year under head coach Chuck Bowman, the Norsemen compiled a perfect 10–0 record, defeated Arizona Western in the Shrine Bowl, were selected as the junior college national champion, and outscored opponents by a total of 327 to 54. NEO also won national championships in 1959 and 1967.

Linebacker Mark Driscoll was selected as a first-team player on the 1969 Grid Wire All-America junior college football team.

Bowman's assistant coaches were John Tiger (offensive line), Robert Maxwell (defensive secondary), Richard Gwinn (defensive line), Don Rominger (defense), Richard Ball (backfield).

The team played its home games at Robertston Field in Miami, Oklahoma.

== Schedule ==
Date	Opponent	Site	Result	Attendance	Source
September 12	Centerville	Robertson Field; Miami, OK	W 16–13		
September 27	at Ellsworth	Iowa Falls, IA	W 6–0		
October 4	Grand Rapids	Robertson Field; Miami, OK	W 47–0		
October 11	at Trinidad	Trinidad, CO	W 28–0		
October 18	Kennedy–King	Robertson Field; Miami, OK	W 58–0		
October 25	at Ferrum	Ferrum, VA	W 58–10		
November 1	Tulsa freshmen	Robertson Field; Miami, OK	W 41–2		
November 8	Iowa Central	Robertson Field; Miami, OK	W 35–10	10,000	
November 15	at McCook	McCook, NE	W 26–13		
November 28	vs. Arizona Western	Savannah, GA (Shrine Bowl)	W 20–6		
