= 1947 Chaffey Panthers football team =

American college football season

1947 Chaffey Panthers football

Eastern Conference co-champion Little Rose Bowl champion

Little Rose Bowl, W 39–26 vs. Cameron
- Conference: Eastern Conference
- Record: 10–1 (4–1 Eastern)
- Head coach: Ray Rosso (2nd season)
- Home stadium: Graber Field

1947 Eastern Conference (California) football standings
	Conf.					Overall
Team	W		L		T	W		L		T
Chaffey +	4	–	1	–	0	10	–	1	–	0
Mt. San Antonio +	4	–	1	–	0	?	–	?	–	?
Fullerton	3	–	2	–	0	7	–	3	–	0
Santa Ana	2	–	3	–	0	5	–	5	–	0
San Bernardino	1	–	4	–	0	3	–	7	–	0
Riverside	1	–	4	–	0	?	–	?	–	?
+ – Conference co-champions

The 1947 Chaffey Panthers football team was an American football team that represented Chaffey College, then of Ontario, California, as a member of the Eastern Conference during the 1947 junior college football season. In their second year under head coach Ray Rosso, the Panthers compiled a 10–1 record (4–1 in conference games), shared the Eastern Conference title with Mt. San Antonio, defeated Cameron of Oklahoma in the Little Rose Bowl, and outscored all opponents by a total of 233 to 88.

Starters included quarterback Anse McCullough, backs Orland DiCiccio, Bill DeYoung, and Austin Snyder, center Johnny Luman, ends Bob Sachs and Chet Nicholson, tackles Jerry Bell and Lou Blanc, and guards Charles Hollingsworth and Charlie Dean.

The team played its home games at Graber Field in Ontario, California.

== Schedule ==
Date	Opponent	Site	Result	Attendance	Source
September 19	East Los Angeles*	Graber Field; Ontario, CA	W 32–8		
September 26	Santa Monica*	Graber Field; Ontario, CA	W 34–7		
October 4	Pasadena*	Graber Field; Ontario, CA	W 13–0		
October 11	at San Bernardino	Orange Show Stadium; San Bernardino, CA	W 13–6	7,000	
October 18	at California freshmen *	Berkeley, CA	W 12–6		
October 25	Santa Ana	Graber Field; Ontario, CA	W 9–0		
October 31	at Oceanside-Carlsbad*	Oceanside, CA	W 21–7		
November 14	Riverside	Graber Field; Ontario, CA	W 13–6		
November 21	at Fullerton	Fullerton, CA	L 13–15		
November 27	Mt. San Antonio	Graber Field; Ontario, CA	W 34–7	11,500	
December 13	vs. Cameron*	Rose Bowl; Pasadena, CA (Little Rose Bowl)	W 39–26	55,000	
*Non-conference game
