= 1952 Memorial Cup =

Canadian junior ice hockey championship

The Memorial Cup trophy

The 1952 Memorial Cup final was the 34th junior ice hockey championship of the Canadian Amateur Hockey Association. The George Richardson Memorial Trophy champions Guelph Biltmores of the Ontario Hockey Association in Eastern Canada competed against the Abbott Cup champion Regina Pats of the Western Canada Junior Hockey League in Western Canada. In a best-of-seven series, held at Maple Leaf Gardens in Toronto, Ontario, and the Guelph Memorial Gardens in Guelph, Ontario, Guelph won their 1st Memorial Cup, defeating Regina 4 games to 0.

== Scores ==
- Game 1: Guelph 8-2 Regina (in Guelph)
- Game 2: Guelph 4-2 Regina (in Toronto)
- Game 3: Guelph 8-2 Regina (in Toronto)
- Game 4: Guelph 10-2 Regina (in Toronto)

== Winning roster ==
Doug Ashley, Andy Bathgate, Frank Bettiol, Marvin Brewer, Lou Fontinato, Ken Graham, Aldo Guidolin, Terry Hagan, Chuck Henderson, Harry Howell, Ken Laufman, Doug Lesser, Bill McCreary, Ron Murphy, Ron Pirie, Dean Prentice, Ray Ross, Ron Stewart, Ken Uniac, Ted Brady, Jim Connelly. Coach: Alf Pike
