= 1963 Orange Coast Pirates football team =

American college football season

1963 Orange Coast Pirates football

Junior college national champion Eastern Conference champion Junior Rose Bowl champion

Junior Rose Bowl, W 21–0 vs. Northeastern Oklahoma A&M
- Conference: Eastern Conference
- Record: 10–0 (9–0 Eastern)
- Head coach: Dick Tucker (2nd season)

1963 Eastern Conference (California) football standings
	Conf.					Overall
Team	W		L		T	W		L		T
Orange Coast $	9	–	0	–	0	10	–	0	–	0
Mt. San Antonio	8	–	1	–	0	8	–	2	–	0
San Bernardino	6	–	2	–	1	6	–	2	–	1
Chaffey	4	–	5	–	0	4	–	5	–	0
Riverside	4	–	5	–	0	4	–	5	–	0
Fullerton	3	–	5	–	1	3	–	5	–	1
Santa Ana	3	–	5	–	1	3	–	5	–	1
Grossmont	3	–	6	–	0	3	–	6	–	0
Southwestern (CA)	2	–	7	–	0	2	–	7	–	0
Citrus	1	–	7	–	1	1	–	7	–	1
$ – Conference champion

The 1963 Orange Coast Pirates football team was an American football team that represented Orange Coast College as a member of the Eastern Conference during the 1963 junior college football season. Led by second-year head coach Dick Tucker, the Pirates compiled a perfect 10–0 record, won the Eastern Conference championship, shut out six opponents, defeated Northeastern Oklahoma A&M in the Junior Rose Bowl, and outscored all opponents by a total of 310 to 43. They were named junior college national champions by J.C. Grid-Wire.

Orange Coast led the Eastern Conference during the regular season in both total offense (337 yards per game) and total defense (164 yards per game). The team tallied 3,040 yards in the regular season (1,677 passing, 1,363 rushing). The team was led on offense by its 5'4", 134-pound quarterback Billy "The Kid" White. Fullback Bob Haynes set a new Eastern Conference record with 107 points scored in the regular season.

Nine Orange Coast players were selected as first-team players on the 1963 All-Eastern Conference football team. Four were named to the first-team offense: backs Billy White and Bob Haynes; center Greg Wojcik; and guard Bill Epperson. Five were named to the first-team defense: tackle Gary Magner; middle guard Don Findley; linebacker Ron Paterno; and defensive halfbacks Mike Hunter and Joe Scott. Back Jeff Thayer was named to the second team.

== Schedule ==
Date	Opponent	Site	Result	Attendance	Source
September 21	at Southwestern (CA)	Chula Vista High School Stadium; Chula Vista, CA	W 24–0		
September 28	Citrus	Pirate Stadium; Costa Mesa, CA	W 40–0		
October 5	San Bernardino^{†}	Costa Mesa, CA	W 48–0	7,800	
October 12	at Fullerton	Fullerton Stadium; Fullerton, CA	W 13–6	8,000	
October 19	Grossmont	Pirate Stadium; Costa Mesa, CA	W 48–7		
October 26	at Mt. San Antonio	Mt. San Antonio College Stadium; Walnut, CA	W 50–24	18,000	
November 2	Santa Ana	Pirate Stadium; Costa Mesa, CA	W 20–0	12,000	
November 9	at Riverside	Wheelock Field; Riverside, CA	W 20–6		
November 16	Chaffey	Pirate Stadium; Costa Mesa, CA	W 46–0	12,000	
December 14	vs. Northeastern Oklahoma A&M*	Rose Bowl; Pasadena, CA (Junior Rose Bowl)	W 21–0	44,044	
*Non-conference game; ^{†}Homecoming
