= 1962 Santa Ana Dons football team =

American college football season

1962 Santa Ana Dons football

National junior college champion Eastern Conference champion Junior Rose Bowl champion

Junior Rose Bowl, W 20–0 vs. Columbia Basin
- Conference: Eastern Conference
- Record: 10–0 (9–0 Eastern)
- Head coach: Homer Beatty (4th season)
- Home stadium: Santa Ana Bowl

1962 Eastern Conference (California) football standings
	Conf.					Overall
Team	W		L		T	W		L		T
Santa Ana $	9	–	0	–	0	10	–	0	–	0
Orange Coast	8	–	1	–	0	9	–	1	–	0
Fullerton	6	–	2	–	1	6	–	2	–	1
Chaffey	6	–	3	–	0	6	–	3	–	0
Mt. San Antonio	5	–	3	–	1	5	–	3	–	1
San Bernardino	3	–	6	–	0	3	–	6	–	0
Riverside	3	–	6	–	0	3	–	6	–	0
Grossmont	2	–	7	–	0	2	–	7	–	0
Southwestern (CA)	1	–	8	–	0	1	–	8	–	0
Citrus	1	–	8	–	0	1	–	8	–	0
$ – Conference champion

The 1962 Santa Ana Dons football team was an American football team that represented Santa Ana College as a member of the Eastern Conference during the 1962 college football season. In their fourth and final year under head coach Homer Beatty, the Dons compiled a perfect 10–0 record, won the Eastern Conference championship, defeated Columbia Basin in the Junior Rose Bowl. They shut out six opponents and gave up only 43 points in all ten games, an average of 4.3 points per game. They outscored opponents by a total of 382 to 43, were ranked No. 1 in the final junior college grid-wire rankings, and were recognized as the national junior college champion.

Four Santa Ana players were selected by J.C. Grid-Wire for the junior college All-America team. Quarterback Dunn Marteen and linebacker Dick Litzinger were named to the first team. Tackle Al Medley was named to the third team, and guard Mike Brown was selected for the fourth team. Marteen also won the team's most valuable player award, and Litzinger won the Tucker Memorial Trophy as the team's most inspirational player. Other team awards went to tackle/end Al Medley as the team's most valuable lineman and defensive halfback Fran Andruski as the most valuable defensive player.

The team's assistant coaches were Russ Chesley (backs), Bill Dutton (line), and Myrel Moore (ends).

The team played its home games at the Santa Ana Bowl in Santa Ana, California.

== Schedule ==
Date	Opponent	Site	Result	Attendance	Source
September 22	at Southwestern (CA)	Chula Vista, CA	W 26–0		
September 29	Citrus	Santa Ana Bowl; Santa Ana, CA	W 47–0		
October 6	San Bernardino	Santa Ana Bowl; Santa Ana, CA	W 48–12		
October 13	Grossmont	Santa Ana Bowl; Santa Ana, CA	W 48–0		
October 20	at Mt. San Antonio	Mt. Sac Stadium; Walnut, CA	W 41–0		
October 27	at Riverside	Riverside, CA	W 39–7		
November 3	Chaffey	Santa Ana Bowl; Santa Ana, CA	W 43–0		
November 10	Orange Coast	Santa Ana Bowl; Santa Ana, CA	W 34–12		
November 17	Fullerton	Fullerton, CA	W 36–12		
December 15	vs. Columbia Basin*	Rose Bowl; Pasadena, CA (Junior Rose Bowl)	W 20–0	41,709	
*Non-conference game
