= 1953 Bakersfield Renegades football team =

American college football season

1953 Bakersfield Renegades football

Metropolitan champion Junior Rose Bowl champion

Junior Rose Bowl, W 13–6 vs. Northeastern Oklahoma A&M
- Conference: Metropolitan Conference
- Record: 12–0 (7–0 Metropolitan)
- Head coach: Homer Beatty (1st season)
- Home stadium: Griffith Stadium

1953 Metropolitan Conference football standings
	Conf.					Overall
Team	W		L		T	W		L		T
Bakersfield $	7	–	0	–	0	12	–	0	–	0
Los Angeles Valley	5	–	2	–	0	6	–	4	–	0
El Camino	4	–	3	–	0	6	–	3	–	0
San Diego Junior College	4	–	3	–	0	6	–	4	–	0
Long Beach	3	–	4	–	0	4	–	5	–	0
Santa Monica	2	–	4	–	1	3	–	5	–	1
Harbor	2	–	5	–	0	2	–	8	–	0
East Los Angeles	0	–	6	–	1	0	–	9	–	1
$ – Conference champion

The 1953 Bakersfield Renegades football team, also known as the Gades, was an American football team that represented Bakersfield College as a member of the Metropolitan Conference during the 1953 junior college football season. In their first year under head coach Homer Beatty, the Renegades compiled a perfect 12–0 record, won the Metropolitan Conference championship, defeated Northeastern Oklahoma A&M in the Junior Rose Bowl, and outscored all opponents by a total of 415 to 93.

Bakersfield halfback Eugene Fitzgerald, also known as the "Burlington Flyer", received honorable mention from the Associated Press 1953 Little All-America college football team. He averaged 13 yards per carry and was the only two-year college player to receive the honor.

When the Renegades were selected to play in the Junior Rose Bowl, The Bakersfield Californian celebrated the announcement by publishing the next edition with a rose aroma. The rose scent, concocted by chemist Frank Hornkohl at the request of editors and mechanical staff of the newspaper, was added to 15 pounds ink before the paper went to press. The Bakersfield City Council also proclaimed December 12 as "Renegade Day". The Bakersfield Californian described the "mass exodus" from Bakersfield to attend the Junior Rose Bowl:

One of the largest, peaceful near-evacuation of a city in the nation already has begun and picks up steam . . . "

The team played its home games at Griffith Stadium in Bakersfield, California.

== Schedule ==
Date	Opponent	Site	Result	Attendance	Source
September 18	Stockton*	Bakersfield, CA	W 18–7		
September 26	Glendale (CA)*	Bakersfield, CA	W 27–0		
October 3	Fresno Junior College*	Ratcliffe Stadium; Fresno, CA	W 16–14	1,500	
October 10	El Camino		W 35–13	8,000	
October 16	at Harbor	Daniels Field; San Pedro, CA	W 41–0		
October 23	East Los Angeles	Bakersfield, CA	W 44–7		
October 31	Long Beach		W 27–13		
November 7	San Diego Junior College		W 30–19		
November 13	Santa Monica	Griffith Stadium; Bakersfield, CA	W 74–2	6,000	
November 21	Los Angeles Valley	Griffith Stadium; Bakersfield, CA	W 33–6		
November 27	at Taft*	Taft, CA	W 57–6		
December 8	vs. Northeastern Oklahoma A&M*	Rose Bowl; Pasadena, CA (Junior Rose Bowl)	W 13–6	50,385	
*Non-conference game

== Roster ==
The team's roster included the following starters:

- Buddy Cuen, fullback, 200 pounds, 6'0
- Gene Fitzgerald, right halfback, 190 pounds, 6'2"
- Rex Garner, center, 210 pounds, 5'11"
- Gary Gore, right guard, 190 pounds, 5'11"
- Don Hammons, left end, 180 pounds, 6'0"
- T.H. Lockard, quarterback, 165 pounds, 6'2"
- Bob James, left guard, 205 pounds 6'0"
- Jim Kennedy, right tackle, 220 pounds, 6'1"
- Budge Loustalot, left halfback, 170 pounds, 5'9"
- Roger Smith, left tackle, 200 pounds, 6'0"
- Leland Stahl, right end, 175 pounds, 6'1"

The team's head coach was Homer Beatty. The assistant coaches were Jim Turner and Don Robards.
