= 1965 Fullerton Hornets football team =

American college football season

1965 Fullerton Hornets football

Junior college national champion Eastern Conference champion Junior Rose Bowl champion

Junior Rose Bowl, W 20–15 vs. Henderson County
- Conference: Eastern Conference
- Record: 10–0 (7–0 Eastern)
- Head coach: Hal Sherbeck (5th season)
- Home stadium: Fullerton Stadium, La Palma Stadium

1965 Eastern Conference (California) football standings
	Conf.					Overall
Team	W		L		T	W		L		T
Fullerton $	7	–	0	–	0	10	–	0	–	0
Santa Ana	5	–	2	–	0	7	–	2	–	1
Riverside	5	–	2	–	0	6	–	3	–	0
Mt. San Antonio	4	–	3	–	0	4	–	5	–	0
Orange Coast	3	–	4	–	0	4	–	5	–	0
Chaffey	2	–	5	–	0	3	–	6	–	0
San Bernardino	1	–	6	–	0	1	–	8	–	0
Citrus	1	–	6	–	0	1	–	8	–	0
$ – Conference champion

The 1965 Fullerton Hornets football team was an American football team that represented Fullerton College as a member of the Eastern Conference during the 1965 junior college football season. Led by fifth-year head coach Hal Sherbeck, the Hornets compiled a perfect 10–0 record (7–0 in conference games), won the Eastern Conference championship and the California junior college championship, and outscored opponents by a total of 379 to 61. They were selected by J. C. Grid-Wire as the national junior college champion for 1965.

The team was led on offense by quarterback Dick Hough.

== Schedule ==
Date	Opponent	Site	Result	Attendance	Source
September 17	San Diego Junior College*	Fullerton Stadium; Fullerton, CA	W 37–14	6,500	
September 25	Santa Monica*		W 27–6		
October 8	at San Bernardino	Orange Show Stadium; San Bernardino, CA	W 59–6	4,000	
October 16	Riverside		W 44–7		
October 23	Orange Coast		W 43–0		
October 30	at Mt. San Antonio	Walnut, CA	W 28–0		
November 6	Citrus	Fullerton, CA	W 38–0		
November 13	Chaffey		W 55–0		
November 20	at Santa Ana		W 28–13		
December 11	Henderson County	Rose Bowl; Pasadena, CA (Junior Rose Bowl)	W 20–15	50,098	
*Non-conference game
