= 1967 junior college football season =

American junior college football season

- National Championship: Shrine Bowl, Savannah, GA (NJCAA)
- Champion(s): Fullerton (Gridwire); Northeastern Oklahoma A&M (NJCAA)

The 1967 junior college football season was the season of intercollegiate junior college football running from September to December 1967. Northeastern Oklahoma A&M won the NJCAA National Football Championship, defeating Lees–McRae in the Shrine Bowl in Savannah, Georgia. Fullerton placed in the top spot in Gridwire's final junior college rankings.

Fullerton won the California state junior college large division playoffs, defeating American River in the championship game, while Hartnell won the California state junior college small division playoffs, beating Reedley in the title game.

== Conference standings ==
=== California ===
==== Large division ====
1967 Eastern Conference (California) football standings
	Conf.					Overall
Team	W		L		T	W		L		T
Fullerton $^	8	–	0	–	0	12	–	0	–	0
Mt. San Antonio	7	–	1	–	0	7	–	2	–	0
Orange Coast	6	–	2	–	0	6	–	3	–	0
Golden West	4	–	4	–	0	5	–	4	–	0
Santa Ana	4	–	4	–	0	5	–	4	–	0
San Bernardino	3	–	5	–	0	3	–	6	–	0
Riverside	3	–	5	–	0	4	–	5	–	0
Cypress	1	–	7	–	0	1	–	8	–	0
Chaffey	0	–	8	–	0	0	–	9	–	0
$ – Conference champion; ^ – California state junior college large division playoff participant

1967 Pacific Southwest Conference football standings
	Conf.					Overall
Team	W		L		T	W		L		T
San Diego Mesa +	3	–	0	–	1	7	–	1	–	1
San Diego City +^	3	–	0	–	1	7	–	3	–	1
Palomar	2	–	2	–	0	3	–	4	–	2
Southwestern (CA)	1	–	3	–	0	1	–	8	–	0
Grossmont	0	–	4	–	0	2	–	7	–	0
+ – Conference co-champions; ^ – California state junior college large division playoff participant

1967 Golden Gate Conference football standings
	Conf.					Overall
Team	W		L		T	W		L		T
Chabot +^	5	–	1	–	1	6	–	3	–	1
Diablo Valley +	5	–	1	–	1	5	–	3	–	1
CC of San Francisco	5	–	2	–	0	5	–	4	–	0
San Jose City	4	–	3	–	0	5	–	4	–	0
San Mateo	3	–	3	–	1	4	–	4	–	1
Merritt	2	–	5	–	0	3	–	6	–	0
Foothill	1	–	5	–	1	1	–	7	–	1
Contra Costa	1	–	6	–	0	2	–	6	–	0
+ – Conference co-champions; ^ – California state junior college large division playoff participant

1967 Valley Conference football standings
	Conf.					Overall
Team	W		L		T	W		L		T
American River $^	5	–	0	–	0	11	–	1	–	0
Sequoias	4	–	1	–	0	6	–	1	–	1
Fresno City	2	–	2	–	1	4	–	4	–	1
Sacramento City	2	–	3	–	0	5	–	2	–	1
San Joaquin Delta	1	–	4	–	0	3	–	5	–	0
Modesto	0	–	4	–	1	1	–	7	–	1
$ – Conference champion; ^ – California state junior college large division playoff participant

1967 Metropolitan Conference football standings
	Conf.					Overall
Team	W		L		T	W		L		T
Bakersfield $^	7	–	0	–	0	9	–	1	–	0
El Camino	6	–	1	–	0	8	–	1	–	0
Long Beach	3	–	3	–	1	5	–	3	–	1
Santa Monica	3	–	3	–	1	5	–	3	–	1
Cerritos	2	–	4	–	1	4	–	4	–	1
Los Angeles Valley	2	–	4	–	1	3	–	5	–	0
East Los Angeles	2	–	5	–	0	3	–	6	–	0
Rio Hondo	1	–	5	–	0	3	–	6	–	0
$ – Conference champion; ^ – California state junior college large division playoff participant

1967 Western State Conference football standings
	Conf.					Overall
Team	W		L		T	W		L		T
Pierce $^	6	–	1	–	0	6	–	4	–	0
Pasadena	5	–	2	–	0	6	–	3	–	0
Ventura	4	–	3	–	0	6	–	3	–	0
Glendale (CA)	4	–	3	–	0	5	–	4	–	0
Harbor	4	–	3	–	0	4	–	5	–	0
Santa Barbara City	3	–	4	–	0	4	–	5	–	0
Compton	1	–	6	–	0	2	–	6	–	1
Los Angeles City	1	–	6	–	0	1	–	9	–	0
$ – Conference champion; ^ – California state junior college large division playoff participant

==== Small division ====
1967 Central Conference football standings
	Conf.					Overall
Team	W		L		T	W		L		T
Coalinga +	5	–	1	–	0	7	–	2	–	0
Reedley +^	5	–	1	–	0	7	–	3	–	1
Porterville	4	–	2	–	0	5	–	4	–	0
Hancock	3	–	3	–	0	3	–	6	–	0
Merced	2	–	4	–	0	3	–	6	–	0
Cuesta	1	–	5	–	0	3	–	6	–	0
Antelope Valley	1	–	5	–	0	2	–	7	–	0
+ – Conference co-champions; ^ – California state junior college small division playoff participant

1967 Coast Conference football standings
	Conf.					Overall
Team	W		L		T	W		L		T
Hartnell +^	7	–	1	–	0	9	–	1	–	1
Monterey Peninsula +	7	–	1	–	0	7	–	2	–	0
Laney	6	–	2	–	0	7	–	2	–	0
Gavilan	4	–	4	–	0	5	–	4	–	0
West Valley	4	–	4	–	0	5	–	4	–	0
Cabrillo	3	–	5	–	0	4	–	5	–	0
Solano	3	–	5	–	0	3	–	5	–	1
De Anza	2	–	6	–	0	3	–	6	–	0
Menlo	0	–	8	–	0	0	–	9	–	0
+ – Conference co-champions; ^ – California state junior college small division playoff participant

1967 Desert Conference football standings
	Conf.					Overall
Team	W		L		T	W		L		T
MiraCosta $^	6	–	0	–	0	8	–	2	–	0
Imperial Valley	5	–	1	–	0	6	–	3	–	0
Mt. San Jacinto	3	–	3	–	0	5	–	4	–	0
Barstow	3	–	3	–	0	3	–	6	–	0
Desert	3	–	3	–	0	3	–	5	–	0
Palo Verde	1	–	5	–	0	3	–	6	–	0
Victor Valley	0	–	6	–	0	0	–	8	–	0
$ – Conference champion; ^ – California state junior college small division playoff participant

1967 Golden Valley Conference football standings
	Conf.					Overall
Team	W		L		T	W		L		T
Marin $^	6	–	0	–	0	8	–	1	–	1
Yuba	4	–	1	–	1	4	–	4	–	1
Shasta	4	–	2	–	0	5	–	3	–	0
Sierra	3	–	2	–	1	5	–	3	–	1
Redwoods	1	–	5	–	0	3	–	6	–	0
Santa Rosa	1	–	5	–	0	2	–	5	–	2
Napa	1	–	5	–	0	2	–	7	–	0
$ – Conference champion; ^ – California state junior college small division playoff participant

=== NCJAA ===
1967 Arizona Junior College Athletic Conference football standings
	Conf.					Overall
Team	W		L		T	W		L		T
Arizona Western $	4	–	0	–	0	9	–	2	–	0
Phoenix	3	–	1	–	0	6	–	4	–	0
Eastern Arizona	1	–	3	–	0	4	–	5	–	0
Glendale (AZ)	1	–	3	–	0	3	–	5	–	1
Mesa (AZ)	1	–	3	–	0	2	–	7	–	0
$ – Conference champion

1967 Intermountain Collegiate Athletic Conference football standings
	Conf.					Overall
Team	W		L		T	W		L		T
Mesa (CO) $	4	–	0	–	0	8	–	1	–	1
Boise	2	–	2	–	0	6	–	4	–	0
Ricks	2	–	2	–	0	?	–	?	–	?
Dixie (UT)	1	–	3	–	0	?	–	?	–	?
Snow	1	–	3	–	0	?	–	?	–	?
$ – Conference champion

1967 Mississippi Junior College Conference football standings
	Conf.					Overall
Team	W		L		T	W		L		T
Perkinston $	9	–	1	–	0	9	–	2	–	0
East Mississippi	8	–	2	–	0	8	–	2	–	0
East Central (MS)	7	–	3	–	0	7	–	3	–	0
Mississippi Delta	7	–	3	–	0	7	–	3	–	0
Holmes	6	–	4	–	0	6	–	4	–	0
Southwest Mississippi	6	–	4	–	0	6	–	4	–	0
Jones County	5	–	5	–	0	5	–	5	–	0
Pearl River	5	–	5	–	0	5	–	5	–	0
Northwest Mississippi	3	–	7	–	0	3	–	7	–	0
Copiah–Lincoln	2	–	8	–	0	2	–	8	–	0
Hinds	1	–	9	–	0	1	–	9	–	0
Itawamba	1	–	9	–	0	1	–	9	–	0
$ – Conference champion

1967 Oklahoma Junior College Conference football standings
	Conf.					Overall
Team	W		L		T	W		L		T
NE Oklahoma A&M $	2	–	0	–	0	9	–	1	–	0
Cameron	1	–	1	–	0	5	–	5	–	0
Oklahoma Military Academy	0	–	2	–	0	1	–	9	–	0
$ – Conference champion

1967 Texas Junior College Football Federation standings
	Conf.					Overall
Team	W		L		T	W		L		T
Henderson County $	6	–	1	–	0	8	–	3	–	0
Cisco	5	–	1	–	1	7	–	2	–	1
Kilgore	4	–	3	–	0	5	–	5	–	0
Navarro	4	–	3	–	0	5	–	5	–	0
Tyler	3	–	4	–	0	7	–	4	–	0
Blinn	2	–	4	–	1	4	–	4	–	1
Wharton	2	–	5	–	0	3	–	7	–	0
Ranger	0	–	7	–	0	1	–	8	–	0
$ – Conference champion

1967 Tri-State Junior College Conference football standings
	Conf.					Overall
Team	W		L		T	W		L		T
Ellsworth +	6	–	1	–	0	9	–	1	–	0
Iowa Central +	6	–	1	–	0	7	–	1	–	0
Centerville	5	–	1	–	0	?	–	?	–	?
North Iowa	4	–	3	–	0	6	–	3	–	0
Estherville	3	–	3	–	0	6	–	3	–	0
Marshalltown	2	–	5	–	0	?	–	?	–	?
Norfolk	1	–	6	–	0	?	–	?	–	?
Waldorf	0	–	7	–	0	?	–	?	–	?
+ – Conference co-champions

1967 Washington Community College Conference football standings
	Conf.					Overall
Team	W		L		T	W		L		T
Everett $	6	–	1	–	0	6	–	3	–	0
Grays Harbor	5	–	2	–	0	7	–	2	–	0
Columbia Basin	4	–	3	–	0	4	–	5	–	0
Olympic	4	–	3	–	0	4	–	5	–	0
Yakima	3	–	3	–	1	3	–	5	–	1
Spokane	3	–	4	–	0	3	–	6	–	0
Wenatchee Valley	1	–	5	–	1	2	–	6	–	1
Shoreline	1	–	6	–	0	2	–	7	–	0
$ – Conference champion

== California state playoffs ==
=== Large division ===
First round November 25
American River	28
Chabot	21
Fullerton	41
San Diego City	6

Semifinals; December 2
Pierce	6
American River	7
Bakersfield	13
Fullerton	14

Championship game December 9 Anaheim Stadium—Anaheim, California
American River	0
Fullerton	41

=== Small division ===
Semifinals; November 25
Marin	29
Hartnell (Note: Hartnell advanced by virtue of winning a coin toss on November 26.)	29
Reedley	25
MiraCosta	21

Championship game December 2 Salinas High School stadium—Salinas, CA
Hartnell	40
Reedley	21
