= 1963 junior college football season =

American junior college football season

- Champion(s): Orange Coast (Gridwire)

The 1963 junior college football season was the season of intercollegiate junior college football running from September to December 1963. Orange Coast, champion of the Eastern Conference in Southern California won the Junior Rose Bowl, played in Pasadena, California, defeating Northeastern Oklahoma A&M before being named national champion by J.C. Grid-Wire.

== Conference standings ==
=== California ===
1963 Central California Junior College Association football standings
	Conf.					Overall
Team	W		L		T	W		L		T
Hancock $	4	–	0	–	0	8	–	1	–	0
Taft	3	–	1	–	0	6	–	2	–	1
Reedley	2	–	2	–	0	5	–	3	–	0
Coalinga	1	–	3	–	0	3	–	6	–	0
Porterville	0	–	4	–	0	3	–	5	–	1
$ – Conference champion

1963 Coast Conference football standings
	Conf.					Overall
Team	W		L		T	W		L		T
Hartnell $	5	–	0	–	0	8	–	2	–	0
Cabrillo	4	–	1	–	0	5	–	2	–	2
Monterey Peninsula	3	–	2	–	0	4	–	5	–	0
Menlo	2	–	3	–	0	4	–	4	–	0
Gavilan	0	–	4	–	1	1	–	6	–	1
Vallejo	0	–	4	–	1	0	–	7	–	1
$ – Conference champion

1963 Eastern Conference (California) football standings
	Conf.					Overall
Team	W		L		T	W		L		T
Orange Coast $	9	–	0	–	0	10	–	0	–	0
Mt. San Antonio	8	–	1	–	0	8	–	2	–	0
San Bernardino	6	–	2	–	1	6	–	2	–	1
Chaffey	4	–	5	–	0	4	–	5	–	0
Riverside	4	–	5	–	0	4	–	5	–	0
Fullerton	3	–	5	–	1	3	–	5	–	1
Santa Ana	3	–	5	–	1	3	–	5	–	1
Grossmont	3	–	6	–	0	3	–	6	–	0
Southwestern (CA)	2	–	7	–	0	2	–	7	–	0
Citrus	1	–	7	–	1	1	–	7	–	1
$ – Conference champion

1963 Golden Gate Conference football standings
	Conf.					Overall
Team	W		L		T	W		L		T
Contra Costa $	7	–	0	–	0	8	–	0	–	0
Foothill	4	–	2	–	0	5	–	3	–	0
Chabot	4	–	3	–	0	5	–	3	–	1
CC of San Francisco	3	–	3	–	0	3	–	4	–	0
San Jose City	3	–	4	–	0	4	–	5	–	0
Oakland City	2	–	4	–	1	4	–	4	–	1
San Mateo	2	–	4	–	1	3	–	5	–	1
Diablo Valley	1	–	6	–	0	2	–	7	–	0
$ – Conference champion

1963 Golden Valley Conference football standings
	Conf.					Overall
Team	W		L		T	W		L		T
Santa Rosa $	5	–	0	–	0	9	–	1	–	0
Marin	4	–	1	–	0	?	–	?	–	?
Yuba	3	–	2	–	0	?	–	?	–	?
Napa	2	–	3	–	0	?	–	?	–	?
Sierra	1	–	4	–	0	?	–	?	–	?
Shasta	0	–	5	–	0	?	–	?	–	?
$ – Conference champion

1963 Metropolitan Conference football standings
	Conf.					Overall
Team	W		L		T	W		L		T
Bakersfield +	6	–	1	–	0	9	–	1	–	0
Long Beach +	6	–	1	–	0	7	–	2	–	0
Cerritos	5	–	2	–	0	7	–	2	–	0
El Camino	4	–	3	–	0	6	–	3	–	0
San Diego Junior College	3	–	4	–	0	5	–	5	–	0
Santa Monica	3	–	4	–	0	4	–	5	–	0
Los Angeles Valley	1	–	6	–	0	2	–	7	–	0
East Los Angeles	0	–	7	–	0	0	–	9	–	0
$ – Conference champion

1963 South Central Conference (California) football standings
	Conf.					Overall
Team	W		L		T	W		L		T
Oceanside-Carlsbad $	5	–	0	–	0	9	–	0	–	0
Santa Barbara City	4	–	1	–	0	6	–	3	–	0
Palomar	3	–	2	–	0	5	–	4	–	0
Antelope Valley	2	–	3	–	0	3	–	6	–	0
Imperial Valley	1	–	4	–	0	2	–	7	–	0
Desert	0	–	5	–	0	0	–	9	–	0
$ – Conference champion

1963 Valley Conference football standings
	Conf.					Overall
Team	W		L		T	W		L		T
Sequoias $	5	–	0	–	0	8	–	1	–	0
Fresno City	3	–	2	–	0	4	–	5	–	0
Sacramento City	3	–	2	–	0	4	–	5	–	0
American River	1	–	3	–	1	3	–	5	–	1
Modesto	1	–	3	–	1	2	–	5	–	2
San Joaquin Delta	1	–	4	–	0	1	–	7	–	1
$ – Conference champion

1963 Western State Conference football standings
	Conf.					Overall
Team	W		L		T	W		L		T
Glendale (CA) $	5	–	0	–	1	7	–	1	–	1
Harbor	4	–	2	–	0	6	–	3	–	0
Compton	3	–	2	–	1	4	–	4	–	1
Los Angeles City	2	–	3	–	1	4	–	4	–	1
Pierce	2	–	3	–	1	2	–	6	–	1
Pasadena	2	–	4	–	0	3	–	6	–	0
Ventura	1	–	5	–	0	1	–	8	–	0
$ – Conference champion

=== NCJAA ===
1963 Empire Junior College Conference football standings
	Conf.					Overall
Team	W		L		T	W		L		T
Trinidad $	3	–	0	–	0	8	–	2	–	0
Northeastern (CO)	2	–	1	–	0	?	–	?	–	?
McCook	1	–	2	–	0	4	–	3	–	0
Scottsbluff	0	–	3	–	0	?	–	?	–	?
$ – Conference champion

1963 Intermountain Collegiate Athletic Conference football standings
	Conf.					Overall
Team	W		L		T	W		L		T
Dixie (UT) $	5	–	0	–	0	9	–	0	–	0
Boise	3	–	2	–	0	5	–	3	–	1
Mesa (CO)	2	–	2	–	1	3	–	6	–	1
Snow	2	–	3	–	0	5	–	4	–	0
Carbon	1	–	3	–	1	1	–	6	–	1
Ricks	1	–	4	–	0	3	–	6	–	0
$ – Conference champion

1963 Northern Illinois Junior College Conference football standings
	Conf.					Overall
Team	W		L		T	W		L		T
Wright +	4	–	2	–	0	5	–	3	–	0
Wilson +	3	–	1	–	2	3	–	2	–	2
Joliet	3	–	2	–	1	3	–	4	–	1
Thornton	2	–	3	–	1	3	–	4	–	1
Morton	1	–	5	–	0	1	–	5	–	0
$ – Conference champion

1963 Oklahoma Junior College Conference football standings
	Conf.					Overall
Team	W		L		T	W		L		T
Oklahoma Military Academy $	6	–	0	–	2	8	–	0	–	2
Eastern Oklahoma A&M	4	–	2	–	2	5	–	2	–	2
Northern Oklahoma	3	–	5	–	0	4	–	5	–	0
Connors	2	–	5	–	1	4	–	5	–	1
Murray State (OK)	2	–	5	–	1	2	–	7	–	1
$ – Conference champion

1963 Texas Eastern Conference football standings
	Conf.					Overall
Team	W		L		T	W		L		T
Tyler $	5	–	1	–	0	7	–	3	–	0
Texarkana	4	–	2	–	0	7	–	4	–	0
Henderson County	2	–	4	–	0	4	–	6	–	0
Kilgore	1	–	5	–	0	2	–	8	–	0
$ – Conference champion

1963 Texas Junior College Conference football standings
	Conf.					Overall
Team	W		L		T	W		L		T
Wharton $	7	–	1	–	0	9	–	1	–	0
Blinn	6	–	2	–	0	7	–	2	–	0
Navarro	4	–	4	–	0	5	–	5	–	0
Cisco	3	–	5	–	0	5	–	5	–	0
Ranger	0	–	8	–	0	1	–	9	–	0
$ – Conference champion

1963 Washington Junior College Conference football standings
	Conf.					Overall
Team	W		L		T	W		L		T
Columbia Basin $	5	–	0	–	0	8	–	0	–	1
Olympic	3	–	2	–	0	6	–	3	–	0
Grays Harbor	3	–	2	–	0	5	–	3	–	0
Everett	2	–	3	–	0	2	–	6	–	0
Yakima	1	–	4	–	0	4	–	4	–	0
Wenatchee Valley	1	–	4	–	0	2	–	7	–	0
$ – Conference champion
