= 1969 junior college football season =

American junior college football season

- National Championship: Shrine Bowl, Savannah, GA (NJCAA)
- Champion(s): Northeastern Oklahoma A&M (NJCAA)

The 1969 junior college football season was the season of intercollegiate junior college football running from September to December 1969. Northeastern Oklahoma A&M won the NJCAA National Football Championship, defeating Arizona Western in the Shrine Bowl in Savannah, Georgia. Fresno City won the California state junior college large division playoffs, defeating Fullerton in the championship game at Anaheim Stadium in Anaheim, California, while Yuba won the California state junior college small division playoffs, beating Saddleback in the title game.

== Conference standings ==
=== California ===
==== Large division ====
1969 Camino Norte Conference football standings
	Conf.					Overall
Team	W		L		T	W		L		T
West Valley $^	5	–	0	–	0	9	–	1	–	0
Contra Costa	4	–	1	–	0	6	–	3	–	0
Marin	3	–	2	–	0	4	–	4	–	0
Santa Rosa	2	–	3	–	0	5	–	4	–	0
Solano	1	–	4	–	0	3	–	6	–	0
De Anza	0	–	5	–	0	0	–	9	–	0
$ – Conference champion; ^ – California state junior college large division playoff participant De Anza forfeited all five conference games.

1969 Golden Gate Conference football standings
	Conf.					Overall
Team	W		L		T	W		L		T
Chabot $^	7	–	0	–	0	9	–	2	–	0
San Mateo	6	–	1	–	0	7	–	2	–	0
Diablo Valley	4	–	2	–	1	5	–	3	–	1
San Jose City	3	–	4	–	0	5	–	4	–	0
Laney	3	–	4	–	0	3	–	6	–	0
Merritt	2	–	5	–	0	3	–	6	–	0
Foothill	1	–	5	–	1	1	–	7	–	1
CC of San Francisco	1	–	6	–	0	2	–	7	–	0
$ – Conference champion; ^ – California state junior college large division playoff participant

1969 Metropolitan Conference football standings
	Conf.					Overall
Team	W		L		T	W		L		T
Bakersfield $^	6	–	0	–	0	10	–	1	–	0
El Camino	5	–	1	–	0	7	–	2	–	0
Los Angeles Valley	3	–	3	–	0	6	–	4	–	0
Pasadena	3	–	3	–	0	5	–	4	–	0
Santa Monica	2	–	4	–	0	5	–	4	–	0
Long Beach	2	–	4	–	0	2	–	7	–	0
Pierce	0	–	6	–	0	1	–	8	–	0
$ – Conference champion; ^ – California state junior college large division playoff participant Pasadena forfeited three conference wins, over Bakersfield, El Camino, and Los Angeles Valley, and a non-conference tie with Rio Hondo because of an ineligible player.

1969 Mission Conference football standings
	Conf.					Overall
Team	W		L		T	W		L		T
Grossmont $^	6	–	0	–	0	7	–	3	–	0
Citrus	5	–	1	–	0	8	–	1	–	0
Palomar	3	–	3	–	0	4	–	5	–	0
Riverside	2	–	3	–	1	5	–	3	–	1
Southwestern (CA)	2	–	3	–	1	4	–	4	–	1
Chaffey	2	–	4	–	0	4	–	5	–	0
San Bernardino	0	–	6	–	0	0	–	9	–	0
$ – Conference champion; ^ – California state junior college large division playoff participant

1969 South Coast Conference (California) football standings
	Conf.					Overall
Team	W		L		T	W		L		T
Fullerton +^	5	–	1	–	0	10	–	2	–	0
San Diego Mesa +	5	–	1	–	0	7	–	2	–	0
Cerritos	4	–	2	–	0	7	–	2	–	0
Orange Coast	3	–	2	–	1	6	–	2	–	1
San Diego City	1	–	4	–	1	1	–	7	–	1
Mt. San Antonio	1	–	5	–	0	1	–	8	–	0
Santa Ana	1	–	5	–	0	1	–	8	–	0
+ – Conference co-champions; ^ – California state junior college large division playoff participant

1969 Southern California Conference football standings
	Conf.					Overall
Team	W		L		T	W		L		T
Harbor $^	5	–	0	–	0	8	–	2	–	0
East Los Angeles	3	–	2	–	0	7	–	2	–	0
Golden West	3	–	2	–	0	6	–	3	–	0
Los Angeles City	3	–	2	–	0	6	–	3	–	0
Rio Hondo *	1	–	4	–	0	3	–	7	–	0
Cypress	0	–	5	–	0	1	–	8	–	0
$ – Conference champion; ^ – California state junior college large division playoff participant * – Pasadena forfeited a non-conference tie with Rio Hondo.

1969 Valley Conference football standings
	Conf.					Overall
Team	W		L		T	W		L		T
Fresno City $^	5	–	0	–	0	9	–	3	–	0
American River	4	–	1	–	0	7	–	2	–	0
Sacramento City	2	–	2	–	1	4	–	4	–	1
Modesto	1	–	3	–	1	4	–	4	–	1
Sequoias	1	–	4	–	0	4	–	5	–	0
San Joaquin Delta	1	–	4	–	0	2	–	7	–	0
$ – Conference champion; ^ – California state junior college large division playoff participant

1969 Western State Conference football standings
	Conf.					Overall
Team	W		L		T	W		L		T
Ventura +	4	–	1	–	0	7	–	2	–	0
Santa Barbara City +^	4	–	1	–	0	7	–	3	–	0
Glendale (CA)	3	–	2	–	0	3	–	6	–	0
Moorpark	2	–	3	–	0	4	–	5	–	0
Compton	2	–	3	–	0	2	–	7	–	1
Antelope Valley	0	–	5	–	0	1	–	8	–	0
+ – Conference co-champions; ^ – California state junior college large division playoff participant

==== Small division ====
1969 Central Conference football standings
	Conf.					Overall
Team	W		L		T	W		L		T
Reedley $^	5	–	0	–	0	9	–	1	–	0
Hancock	4	–	1	–	0	7	–	2	–	0
West Hills	3	–	2	–	0	4	–	5	–	0
Porterville	2	–	3	–	0	2	–	6	–	1
Cuesta	1	–	4	–	0	4	–	5	–	0
Merced	0	–	5	–	0	1	–	8	–	0
$ – Conference champion; ^ – California state junior college small division playoff participant

1969 Coast Conference football standings
	Conf.					Overall
Team	W		L		T	W		L		T
Hartnell $^	5	–	0	–	0	6	–	4	–	0
Monterey Peninsula	4	–	1	–	0	6	–	3	–	0
Gavilan	3	–	2	–	0	6	–	3	–	0
Cabrillo	2	–	3	–	0	2	–	7	–	0
Ohlone	1	–	4	–	0	2	–	7	–	0
Menlo	0	–	5	–	0	2	–	6	–	0
$ – Conference champion; ^ – California state junior college small division playoff participant

1969 Desert Conference football standings
	Conf.					Overall
Team	W		L		T	W		L		T
Saddleback $^	6	–	0	–	0	9	–	2	–	0
MiraCosta	5	–	1	–	0	6	–	3	–	0
Mt. San Jacinto	4	–	2	–	0	6	–	3	–	0
Imperial Valley	3	–	3	–	0	5	–	4	–	0
Barstow	2	–	4	–	0	2	–	6	–	1
Desert	1	–	5	–	0	2	–	7	–	0
Victor Valley	0	–	6	–	0	1	–	8	–	0
$ – Conference champion; ^ – California state junior college small division playoff participant

1969 Golden Valley Conference football standings
	Conf.					Overall
Team	W		L		T	W		L		T
Yuba +^	5	–	1	–	0	10	–	1	–	0
Redwoods +	5	–	1	–	0	8	–	1	–	0
Butte	4	–	2	–	0	5	–	4	–	0
Shasta	3	–	3	–	0	3	–	6	–	0
Sierra	2	–	4	–	0	2	–	7	–	0
Napa	1	–	5	–	0	2	–	7	–	0
Siskiyous	1	–	5	–	0	1	–	7	–	0
+ – Conference co-champions; ^ – California state junior college small division playoff participant

=== NCJAA ===
1969 Arizona Junior College Athletic Conference football standings
	Conf.					Overall
Team	W		L		T	W		L		T
Arizona Western $	4	–	0	–	0	9	–	1	–	0
Eastern Arizona	3	–	1	–	0	5	–	3	–	0
Phoenix	1	–	3	–	0	4	–	5	–	1
Glendale (AZ)	1	–	3	–	0	4	–	5	–	0
Mesa (AZ)	1	–	3	–	0	3	–	6	–	0
$ – Conference champion

1969 Intermountain Collegiate Athletic Conference football standings
	Conf.					Overall
Team	W		L		T	W		L		T
Mesa (CO) $	3	–	0	–	0	6	–	2	–	2
Ricks	2	–	1	–	0	4	–	5	–	0
Snow	1	–	2	–	0	2	–	7	–	0
Dixie (UT)	0	–	3	–	0	2	–	7	–	0
$ – Conference champion

1969 Iowa Junior College Conference football standings
	Conf.					Overall
Team	W		L		T	W		L		T
Iowa Central $	4	–	0	–	1	8	–	1	–	1
Centerville	4	–	1	–	0	7	–	3	–	0
Ellsworth	3	–	1	–	1	6	–	2	–	1
North Iowa Area	2	–	3	–	0	2	–	6	–	0
Marshalltown	1	–	4	–	0	1	–	7	–	0
Iowa Lakes	0	–	5	–	0	0	–	8	–	0
$ – Conference champion

1969 Mississippi Junior College Conference football standings
	Conf.					Overall
Team	W		L		T	W		L		T
Pearl River $	9	–	0	–	0	9	–	0	–	0
East Mississippi	8	–	1	–	0	?	–	?	–	?
Northeast Mississippi	7	–	2	–	0	?	–	?	–	?
Jones County	7	–	2	–	0	?	–	?	–	?
Mississippi Delta	5	–	3	–	1	?	–	?	–	?
Mississippi Gulf Coast	6	–	4	–	0	7	–	4	–	0
Holmes	5	–	5	–	0	?	–	?	–	?
Itawamba	4	–	5	–	0	?	–	?	–	?
Hinds	3	–	6	–	0	?	–	?	–	?
Southwest Mississippi	3	–	7	–	0	?	–	?	–	?
Northwest Mississippi	2	–	6	–	1	?	–	?	–	?
Copiah–Lincoln	1	–	8	–	0	?	–	?	–	?
East Central (MS)	0	–	9	–	0	?	–	?	–	?
$ – Conference champion

1969 Northern Illinois Junior College Conference football standings
	Conf.					Overall
Team	W		L		T	W		L		T
Kennedy–King $	5	–	0	–	1	5	–	2	–	1
Rock Valley	5	–	1	–	0	7	–	2	–	0
Wright	4	–	1	–	1	4	–	3	–	1
Thornton	2	–	4	–	0	3	–	4	–	1
Joliet	2	–	4	–	0	2	–	6	–	0
DuPage	2	–	4	–	0	2	–	7	–	0
Morton	0	–	6	–	0	2	–	6	–	0
$ – Conference champion

1969 Texas Junior College Football Federation standings
	Conf.					Overall
Team	W		L		T	W		L		T
Tyler $	7	–	0	–	0	10	–	1	–	0
Blinn	6	–	1	–	0	7	–	2	–	0
Henderson County	4	–	3	–	0	7	–	3	–	0
Kilgore	3	–	4	–	0	4	–	6	–	0
Wharton	2	–	5	–	0	4	–	6	–	0
Cisco	2	–	5	–	0	4	–	6	–	0
Navarro	2	–	5	–	0	3	–	7	–	0
Ranger	2	–	5	–	0	2	–	6	–	0
$ – Conference champion

1969 Washington Community College Conference football standings
	Conf.					Overall
Team	W		L		T	W		L		T
Eastern Division
Spokane Falls xy	5	–	1	–	0	7	–	3	–	0
Yakima	5	–	1	–	0	6	–	3	–	0
Columbia Basin	3	–	3	–	0	5	–	2	–	0
Wenatchee Valley	0	–	6	–	0	0	–	9	–	0
Western Division
Grays Harbor xy$	5	–	1	–	0	8	–	2	–	0
Olympic	2	–	4	–	0	3	–	6	–	0
Everett	1	–	5	–	0	4	–	5	–	0
WCCC championship game: Grays Harbor 16, Spokane Falls 12
$ – Conference champion; x – Division champion/co-champions; y – Championship game participant

== California state playoffs ==
=== Large division ===
Quarterfinals; November 29
Santa Barbara City	0
Bakersfield	49
Fullerton	40
Grossmont	19
Harbor	13
Fresno City	36
West Valley	20
Chabot	45

Semifinals; December 6
Bakersfield	16
Fullerton	26
Fresno City	23
Chabot	7

Championship game December 14; Anaheim Stadium—Anaheim, California
Fullerton	9
Fresno City	28

=== Small division ===
Semifinals; November 29
Reedley	19
Saddleback	40
Yuba	10
Hartnell	7

Championship game December 6 Marysville High School—Marysville, CA
Saddleback	19
Yuba	24
