= 1965 junior college football season =

American junior college football season

- National Championship: Shrine Bowl, Savannah, GA (NJCAA)
- Champion(s): Fullteron (Gridwire); Ferrum (NJCAA)

The 1965 junior college football season was the season of intercollegiate junior college football running from September to December 1965. Ferrum won the NJCAA National Football Championship, defeating McCook in the Shrine Bowl in Savannah, Georgia. Fullerton, champions of California's Eastern Conference and winners of the Junior Rose Bowl over Henderson County, placed in the top spot in Gridwire's final junior college rankings.

== Conference standings ==
=== California ===
1965 Central California Junior College Association football standings
	Conf.					Overall
Team	W		L		T	W		L		T
Reedley $	5	–	0	–	0	7	–	3	–	0
Merced	4	–	2	–	0	6	–	3	–	0
Hancock	4	–	2	–	0	5	–	3	–	0
Antelope Valley	3	–	2	–	1	5	–	3	–	1
Coalinga	1	–	3	–	2	2	–	5	–	2
Porterville	1	–	5	–	0	3	–	6	–	0
Cuesta	0	–	4	–	1	0	–	7	–	1
$ – Conference champion

1965 Coast Conference football standings
	Conf.					Overall
Team	W		L		T	W		L		T
Monterey Peninsula $	6	–	0	–	0	9	–	1	–	0
West Valley	4	–	2	–	0	5	–	4	–	0
Cabrillo	4	–	2	–	0	4	–	5	–	0
Hartnell	3	–	3	–	0	5	–	4	–	0
Vallejo	2	–	4	–	0	2	–	6	–	1
Menlo	1	–	5	–	0	3	–	6	–	0
Gavilan	1	–	5	–	0	1	–	8	–	0
$ – Conference champion

1965 Eastern Conference (California) football standings
	Conf.					Overall
Team	W		L		T	W		L		T
Fullerton $	7	–	0	–	0	10	–	0	–	0
Santa Ana	5	–	2	–	0	7	–	2	–	1
Riverside	5	–	2	–	0	6	–	3	–	0
Mt. San Antonio	4	–	3	–	0	4	–	5	–	0
Orange Coast	3	–	4	–	0	4	–	5	–	0
Chaffey	2	–	5	–	0	3	–	6	–	0
San Bernardino	1	–	6	–	0	1	–	8	–	0
Citrus	1	–	6	–	0	1	–	8	–	0
$ – Conference champion

1965 Golden Gate Conference football standings
	Conf.					Overall
Team	W		L		T	W		L		T
CC of San Francisco $	6	–	0	–	1	8	–	1	–	1
Foothill	5	–	2	–	0	7	–	3	–	0
San Jose City	5	–	2	–	0	5	–	4	–	0
Chabot	4	–	3	–	0	5	–	4	–	0
Diablo Valley	3	–	3	–	1	5	–	3	–	1
San Mateo	2	–	5	–	0	2	–	7	–	0
Merritt	1	–	6	–	0	2	–	7	–	0
Contra Costa	1	–	6	–	0	2	–	8	–	0
$ – Conference champion

1965 Golden Valley Conference football standings
	Conf.					Overall
Team	W		L		T	W		L		T
Shasta $	5	–	0	–	0	6	–	4	–	0
Yuba	4	–	1	–	0	5	–	4	–	0
Santa Rosa	3	–	2	–	0	4	–	5	–	0
Napa	2	–	3	–	0	4	–	5	–	0
Marin	1	–	4	–	0	2	–	6	–	1
Sierra	0	–	5	–	0	1	–	8	–	0
$ – Conference champion

1965 Metropolitan Conference football standings
	Conf.					Overall
Team	W		L		T	W		L		T
Cerritos $	6	–	0	–	0	10	–	0	–	0
Long Beach	5	–	1	–	0	7	–	2	–	1
Bakersfield	4	–	2	–	0	7	–	2	–	0
El Camino	2	–	3	–	1	5	–	3	–	1
Los Angeles Valley	2	–	4	–	0	5	–	4	–	0
Santa Monica	1	–	4	–	1	3	–	5	–	1
East Los Angeles	0	–	6	–	0	0	–	9	–	0
$ – Conference champion

1965 Pacific Southwest Conference football standings
	Conf.					Overall
Team	W		L		T	W		L		T
San Diego Junior College $	7	–	0	–	0	7	–	2	–	0
San Diego Mesa	5	–	2	–	0	7	–	2	–	0
Grossmont	4	–	3	–	0	4	–	5	–	0
MiraCosta	4	–	3	–	0	4	–	5	–	0
Palomar	3	–	4	–	0	5	–	4	–	0
Imperial Valley	2	–	5	–	0	3	–	6	–	0
Southwestern (CA)	2	–	5	–	0	4	–	5	–	0
Desert	1	–	6	–	0	2	–	7	–	0
$ – Conference champion

1965 Valley Conference football standings
	Conf.					Overall
Team	W		L		T	W		L		T
Sequoias $	4	–	0	–	1	7	–	2	–	1
Fresno City	3	–	2	–	0	6	–	3	–	0
San Joaquin Delta	3	–	2	–	0	6	–	3	–	0
Sacramento City	2	–	3	–	0	6	–	3	–	0
American River	1	–	3	–	1	4	–	4	–	1
Modesto	1	–	4	–	0	4	–	5	–	0
$ – Conference champion

1965 Western State Conference football standings
	Conf.					Overall
Team	W		L		T	W		L		T
Ventura $	6	–	1	–	0	8	–	2	–	0
Harbor	5	–	2	–	0	8	–	2	–	0
Glendale (CA)	5	–	2	–	0	7	–	2	–	0
Pasadena	4	–	3	–	0	6	–	3	–	0
Pierce	4	–	3	–	0	4	–	5	–	0
Los Angeles City	3	–	4	–	0	5	–	4	–	0
Santa Barbara City	1	–	6	–	0	2	–	7	–	0
Compton	0	–	7	–	0	1	–	8	–	0
$ – Conference champion

=== NCJAA ===
1965 Arizona Junior College Athletic Conference football standings
	Conf.					Overall
Team	W		L		T	W		L		T
Phoenix $	2	–	0	–	0	3	–	5	–	0
Arizona Western	1	–	1	–	0	8	–	1	–	0
Eastern Arizona	0	–	2	–	0	1	–	7	–	1
$ – Conference champion

1965 Intermountain Collegiate Athletic Conference football standings
	Conf.					Overall
Team	W		L		T	W		L		T
Boise $	4	–	0	–	0	9	–	1	–	0
Snow	3	–	1	–	0	5	–	4	–	0
Dixie (UT)	2	–	2	–	0	5	–	4	–	0
Mesa (CO)	1	–	3	–	0	2	–	6	–	1
Ricks	0	–	4	–	0	1	–	8	–	0
$ – Conference champion; Dixie and Ricks played a second game on November 13 that did not count in the conference standings.

1965 Interstate Conference football standings
	Conf.					Overall
Team	W		L		T	W		L		T
Joplin $	5	–	0	–	0	10	–	0	–	0
Highland	4	–	1	–	0	7	–	1	–	0
Fairbury	3	–	2	–	0	5	–	4	–	0
Wentworth	2	–	3	–	0	3	–	5	–	0
Haskell	1	–	4	–	0	1	–	8	–	0
Kemper	0	–	5	–	0	1	–	7	–	0
$ – Conference champion

1965 Oklahoma Junior College Conference football standings
	Conf.					Overall
Team	W		L		T	W		L		T
Eastern Oklahoma A&M $	3	–	0	–	1	5	–	3	–	1
Murray State (OK)	2	–	1	–	1	3	–	5	–	2
Oklahoma Military Academy	2	–	2	–	0	5	–	5	–	0
Northern Oklahoma	2	–	2	–	0	3	–	5	–	0
Connors	0	–	4	–	0	0	–	10	–	0
$ – Conference champion

1965 Texas Junior College Football Federation standings
	Conf.					Overall
Team	W		L		T	W		L		T
Henderson County $	7	–	0	–	0	10	–	1	–	0
Kilgore	4	–	3	–	0	8	–	3	–	0
Navarro	4	–	3	–	0	5	–	3	–	0
Blinn	3	–	3	–	1	4	–	3	–	1
Wharton	3	–	3	–	1	4	–	3	–	1
Tyler	3	–	4	–	0	4	–	6	–	0
Cisco	3	–	4	–	0	5	–	4	–	0
Ranger	0	–	7	–	0	0	–	9	–	0
$ – Conference champion

1965 Tri-State Junior College Conference football standings
	Conf.					Overall
Team	W		L		T	W		L		T
Ellsworth $	6	–	0	–	1	6	–	2	–	1
Norfolk	6	–	1	–	0	?	–	?	–	?
Estherville	3	–	2	–	1	?	–	?	–	?
Mason City	4	–	3	–	0	4	–	3	–	0
Centerville	2	–	3	–	0	?	–	?	–	?
Waldorf	1	–	5	–	1	?	–	?	–	?
Fort Dodge	1	–	5	–	1	?	–	?	–	?
Worthington	1	–	5	–	0	?	–	?	–	?
$ – Conference champion

1965 Washington Junior College Conference football standings
	Conf.					Overall
Team	W		L		T	W		L		T
Columbia Basin $	6	–	0	–	0	9	–	0	–	0
Wenatchee Valley	4	–	2	–	0	4	–	3	–	1
Shoreline	3	–	2	–	1	3	–	5	–	1
Grays Harbor	3	–	3	–	0	5	–	3	–	1
Yakima	2	–	3	–	1	3	–	3	–	2
Everett	2	–	4	–	0	2	–	7	–	0
Olympic	0	–	6	–	0	0	–	8	–	0
$ – Conference champion
