= Ray Ross (ice hockey) =

Canadian ice hockey player (1932–2017)

- Born: January 11, 1932 Hamilton, Ontario, Canada
- Died: June 3, 2017 (aged 85)
- Height: 6 ft 1 in (185 cm)
- Weight: 175 lb (79 kg; 12 st 7 lb)
- Position: Center
- Shot: Left
- Played for: Cleveland Barons; Providence Reds; Pittsburgh Hornets; Edmonton Flyers; Saskatoon/St. Paul Regals; Vancouver Canucks
- Playing career: 1949–1967

Raymond Arnold Ross (January 11, 1932 – June 3, 2017) was a Canadian professional ice hockey center who played for the Cleveland Barons, Pittsburgh Hornets, and Providence Reds in the American Hockey League, totalling 542 games. He also played for the Edmonton Flyers, Saskatoon/St. Paul Regals, and Vancouver Canucks in the Western Hockey League. Ross died after a brief illness at home, on June 3, 2017, at the age of 85.
