= Four-year junior college =

Defunct type of American school

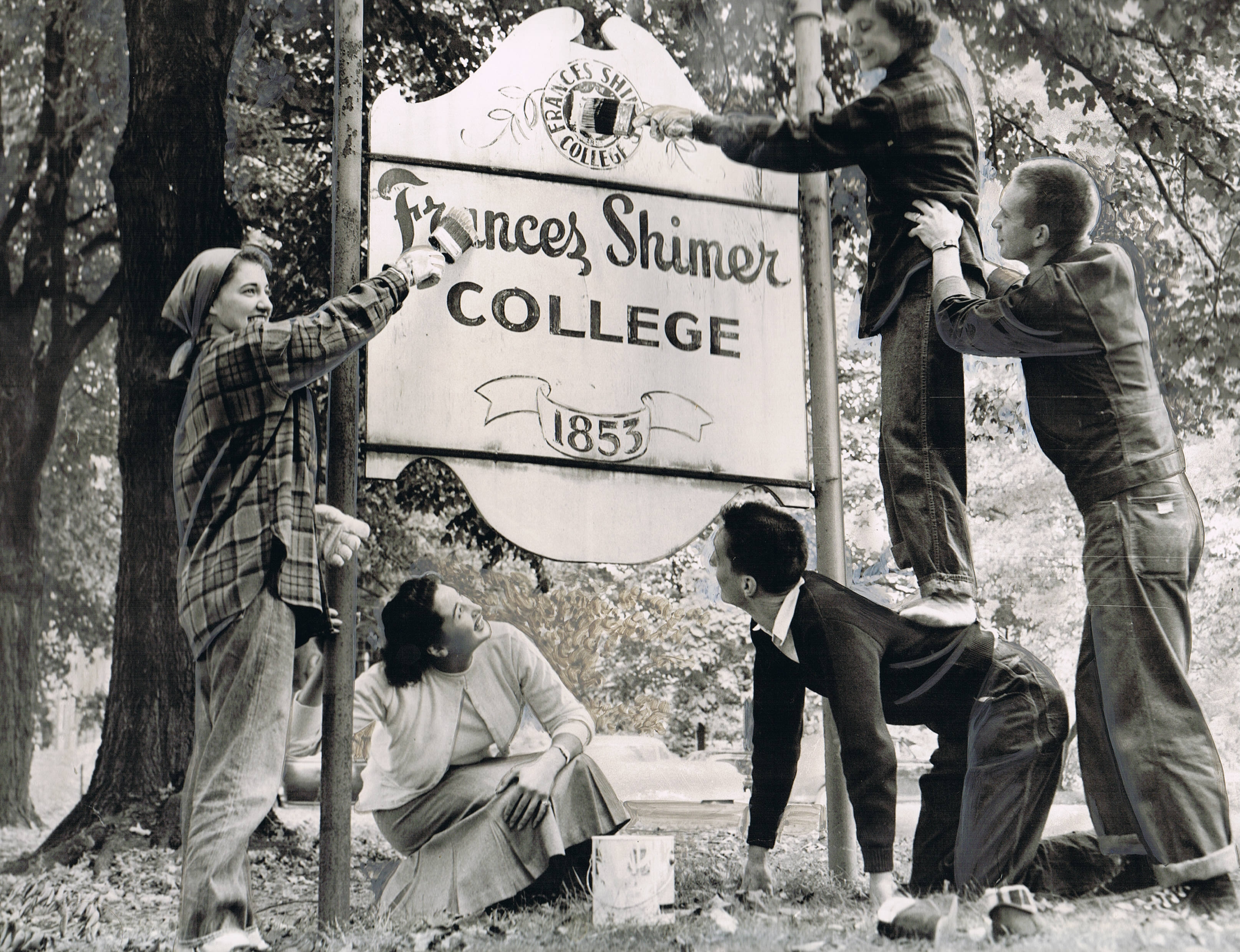
Students repainting the Shimer College sign to reflect its change from a four-year junior college to a regular college.

A four-year junior college was a type of educational institution in the United States in the 20th century that provided education from the 11th to the 14th grades, corresponding to the last two years of high school and the first two years of college. Although these are now considered secondary education and tertiary education respectively, advocates of the four-year junior college argued that all four years should be considered part of secondary education.

The first proposal for four-year junior colleges was made in 1894, by George A. Merrill, Director of the Wilmerding School of Industrial Arts in San Francisco, California. The first law formally authorizing such institutions was enacted in 1908. However, the idea took some time to catch on. The first four-year junior was established in Texas in 1923 as Hillsboro Junior College, known today as Hill College. Many others were established soon thereafter, but even in 1931, they numbered fewer than ten nationwide.

The four-year junior college movement was closely associated with a broader movement for a 6-4-4 educational system: six years of elementary school, four years of junior high school, and four years of junior college (or "senior school"). Under this plan, graduation from junior college would "mark the end of the period of general education", and students who wished would then proceed to more specialized education leading to the bachelor's degree and beyond.

Around its peak in 1942, the movement embraced 34 institutions nationwide, enrolling about 16,000 students in total. Five of these institutions and 8,000 of the students were in California. The development of the movement in California was aided by a state law allowing individual districts to adopt a 6-4-4 plan. Seven did so and established four-year public junior colleges: Pasadena (1928), Compton (1932), Ventura (1937), Pomona (1942), Napa (1942), Vallejo (1945), Stockton (1948). From the late-1940s to the early-1960s, all of these localities changed back to a traditional high-school system. The last holdout was Napa, which reverted in 1964.

== Arguments ==
Advocates of four-year junior colleges advanced ten arguments in their system's favor:

1. Four-year junior colleges could deal better with the unique psychological challenges of adolescence.
2. Unnecessary overlap between high-school and college coursework could be eliminated.
3. Capital and maintenance costs could be reduced.
4. Student time could be saved, with "superior" students finishing in three years rather than four.
5. Students could be better prepared for semiprofessional work.
6. Better student counseling could be provided over a four-year period than in a two-year junior college.
7. Localities that could not support a two-year junior college due to scale would be able to support a four-year one.
8. The four-year junior college would more closely resemble the successful German Gymnasium system.
9. The legal dropout age of 16 makes the 10th grade a more logical breaking point than the 12th.
10. A four-year junior institution can attract better teachers and staff than a two-year one.

== List of four-year junior colleges ==
This is a list of schools that at one time adopted a four-year junior college curriculum.

Contemporary name	Current name (if extant)	Locality	State	Years as four-year junior college	Public/private	Remarks
Alliance College	–	Cambridge Springs	Pennsylvania		Private	Men only
Bartlesville Junior College	–	Bartlesville	Oklahoma	1940-1950	Public	
Cameron State Agricultural College	Cameron University	Lawton	Oklahoma	1927-1941	Public	
Carbon College	Utah State University Eastern	Price	Utah		Public	
Cazenovia Seminary		Cazenovia	New York	1934-1940	Private	
Central College	Central Christian College of Kansas	McPherson	Kansas		Private	
Compton College	El Camino College Compton Center	Compton	California	1932-1949	Public	
Dixie Junior College	Utah Tech University	St. George	Utah	1970-2000	Public	Two Year Junior from 1923-1970, four year 1970-2000
East Central Junior College	East Central Community College	Decatur	Mississippi		Public	
Frances Shimer College	Shimer College	Mount Carroll	Illinois	1931-1950	Private	Women only
Goddard College	–	Plainfield	Vermont	1938-1940	Private	
Greenbrier College	–	Lewisburg	West Virginia		Private	Women only
Harrison-Stone-Jackson Junior College	Mississippi Gulf Coast Community College	Perkinston	Mississippi		Public	
Hillsboro Junior College	Hill College	Hillsboro	Texas	1923-1950	Public	closed after 1950, reopened in 1962 as a two-year institution
Hiwassee College	Hiwassee College	Madisonville	Tennessee		Private	
Iberia Junior College	–	Iberia	Missouri		Private	
Jefferson City Junior College	–	Jefferson City	Missouri		Public	
John Tarleton Agricultural College	Tarleton State University	Stephenville	Texas	1917-	Public	
Marot Junior College	–	Thompson	Connecticut	—1942	Private	Women only
Meridian Junior College	Meridian Community College	Meridian	Mississippi		Public	
Moberly Junior College	Moberly Area Community College	Moberly	Missouri		Public	
Mount Aloysius Junior College	Mount Aloysius College	Cresson	Pennsylvania		Private	Women only
Napa Junior College	Napa Valley College	Napa	California	1942-1964	Public	
National Park College	–	Forest Glen	Maryland	–1942	Private	Women only
Oxford College	Oxford College of Emory University	Oxford	Georgia	1947-1963	Private	
College of Paola	–	Paola	Kansas	–1957 (?)	Private	Women only
Parsons Junior College	Labette Community College	Parsons	Kansas	1935-	Public	
Pasadena Junior College	Pasadena City College	Pasadena	California	1928-1953	Public	
Pearl River Junior College	Pearl River Community College	Poplarville	Mississippi		Public	
Pomona Junior College	Mount San Antonio College	Pomona	California	1942-1946	Public	
St. Mary’s Female Seminary-Junior College	St. Mary's College of Maryland	St. Mary's City	Maryland	1926-1960	Public	Women only - later coeducational
Saint Mary's Junior College	Saint Mary's School	Raleigh	North Carolina		Private	Women only
Snow College	Snow College	Ephraim	Utah		Public	
Stephens College	Stephens College	Columbia	Missouri		Private	Women only
Stockton Junior College	San Joaquin Delta College	Stockton	California	1948-1953	Public	
Vallejo Junior College	Solano Community College	Vallejo	California	1945-1955	Public	
Ventura Junior College	Ventura College	Ventura	California	1937-1949	Public	
Vermont Junior College	Vermont College of Fine Arts	Montpelier	Vermont		Private	
Westminster College	Westminster College	Salt Lake City	Utah		Private	

== Aftermath ==
Four-year junior colleges and the 6-4-4 movement were never able to achieve the critical mass required to shift the national educational system, and had faded away by the mid-1960s. A number of problems have been cited for the inability of the idea to take root, including problems with inter-institutional competition, resistance to change, and vested interests. In addition, "one of the greatest problems" was the incompatibility between the restrictions imposed by law on high school students in the institution's first two years and the greater freedom desired by students in the institution's second two years. The differing regulatory and accreditation requirements often also meant that students in the last two years of the school could not take the same classes as students in the first two years for equivalent credit.

Perhaps as a result of these issues, in some institutions, such as Shimer College in Illinois, the four-year junior college essentially functioned as two separate institutions, with most students either transferring in or out after the 12th grade, and only a handful of students continuing through the full four years. As a result, many of the economies envisioned by advocates of the four-year junior college system could not be achieved.

The public junior colleges that had adopted four-year junior college curricula, such as those in California and Texas, chiefly returned to a two-year junior college model; many are now community colleges. Many of the private colleges that had adopted the model are now four-year colleges.

The problem of providing a smooth transition between high school and college remained, however, and was tackled by Robert Maynard Hutchins, first at the University of Chicago and later nationwide through the Fund for the Advancement of Education. Hutchins' approach involved eliminating the last two years of high school entirely for the top 25% of students, and allowing them to proceed directly to college and obtain their bachelor's degree at the age at which they would ordinarily have been only two years through college. The plan faced stiff resistance from a variety of entrenched constituencies, including university faculty and high school principals, and most such early entrance to college programs disappeared, reappearing decades later as a form of gifted education. However, at Shimer College in Chicago, which had previously been a women's four-year junior college, an early entrance program descended directly from the Hutchins program remains in place.

== See also ==
- Secondary school

== Works cited ==
- Diener, Thomas (1986). Growth of an American Invention: A Documentary History of the Junior and Community College Movement. ISBN 0313249938.
- Eells, Walter C. (1931). "What Manner of Child Shall This Be?". Junior College Journal. 1., reprinted in Diener 1986, pages 99–115.
- Eells, Walter Crosby, ed. (1940). American Junior Colleges. American Council on Education.
- Glass, Rose (1953). "Shimer College History (1853–1950)" . In Hostetter, A. Beth (ed.). Centennial Anniversary Record. Mt. Carroll, Ill.: Shimer College. pp. 3–22. OCLC 33122715.
- Sexson, John Amherst; Harbeson, John Wesley (1946). The New American College.
- Thelin, John R. (2004). A History of American Higher Education. ISBN 0801880041.
- Winter, Carl G. (1964). History of the Junior College Movement in California (PDF). Bureau of Junior College.
- Wood, James M. (1930). "The Four-Year Junior College". The Journal of Higher Education. 1 (9). Ohio State University Press: 515–519. doi:10.2307/1974766. JSTOR 1974766.
