= Northern Illinois Junior College Conference =

Defunct college athletic conference

The Northern Illinois Junior College Conference (NIJCC) was a junior college athletic conference composed of member schools located in Northern Illinois. The conference was formed on March 17, 1923 at a meeting held at the YMCA Hotel in Chicago. Six schools were represented at the meeting: Chicago Normal School (now known as Chicago State University), Crane Junior College (now known as Malcolm X College), Elgin Academy, Elmhurst Junior College (now known as Elmhurst University), North Park Junior College (now known as North Park University), and St. Procopius College (now known as Benedictine University). At a second meeting, held a week later, the Medill College of Commerce and Administration was added at the conference's seventh member.

In 1965, Rock Valley College was admitted to the conference for competition in the 1966–67 season.

== Football champions ==
- 1923: Elgin
- 1924: Elgin
- 1925: St. Procopius
- 1926: Elgin
- 1927: Crane
- 1928: Morton
- 1931: Morton
- 1963: Wilson and Wright
- 1964: Thornton
- 1966: Wilson
- 1968: Wilson and Wright
- 1969: Kennedy–King

== Yearly football standings ==
1963 Northern Illinois Junior College Conference football standings
	Conf.					Overall
Team	W		L		T	W		L		T
Wright +	4	–	2	–	0	5	–	3	–	0
Wilson +	3	–	1	–	2	3	–	2	–	2
Joliet	3	–	2	–	1	3	–	4	–	1
Thornton	2	–	3	–	1	3	–	4	–	1
Morton	1	–	5	–	0	1	–	5	–	0
$ – Conference champion

1964 Northern Illinois Junior College Conference football standings
	Conf.					Overall
Team	W		L		T	W		L		T
Thornton $	5	–	1	–	0	?	–	?	–	?
Wright	4	–	2	–	0	?	–	?	–	?
Joliet	3	–	3	–	0	?	–	?	–	?
Wilson	3	–	3	–	0	?	–	?	–	?
Morton	0	–	6	–	0	?	–	?	–	?
$ – Conference champion

1966 Northern Illinois Junior College Conference football standings
	Conf.					Overall
Team	W		L		T	W		L		T
Wilson $	6	–	0	–	0	8	–	1	–	0
Joliet	5	–	1	–	0	5	–	3	–	0
Wright	3	–	3	–	0	4	–	4	–	0
Thornton	1	–	5	–	0	2	–	6	–	1
Morton	0	–	6	–	0	0	–	7	–	0
$ – Conference champion

1968 Northern Illinois Junior College Conference football standings
	Conf.					Overall
Team	W		L		T	W		L		T
Wilson +	5	–	1	–	0	7	–	2	–	0
Wright +	5	–	1	–	0	6	–	2	–	0
Thornton	4	–	2	–	0	5	–	3	–	0
DuPage	4	–	2	–	0	5	–	4	–	0
Morton	2	–	4	–	0	3	–	5	–	0
Joliet	1	–	5	–	0	1	–	7	–	0
Rock Valley	0	–	6	–	0	0	–	9	–	0
+ – Conference co-champions

1969 Northern Illinois Junior College Conference football standings
	Conf.					Overall
Team	W		L		T	W		L		T
Kennedy–King $	5	–	0	–	1	5	–	2	–	1
Rock Valley	5	–	1	–	0	7	–	2	–	0
Wright	4	–	1	–	1	4	–	3	–	1
Thornton	2	–	4	–	0	3	–	4	–	1
Joliet	2	–	4	–	0	2	–	6	–	0
DuPage	2	–	4	–	0	2	–	7	–	0
Morton	0	–	6	–	0	2	–	6	–	0
$ – Conference champion
