= Centerville Community College =

College in Centerville, Iowa

Coordinates: 40.7396°N 92.8869°W

- Centerville, Iowa; United States

Information
- Type: College
- Established: 1930

The Centerville Community College, is a college in Centerville, Iowa.

== History ==
The college was the idea of E. W. Fannon, the Superintendent of the Centerville School System. Then known as Centerville Junior College, it was organized in 1930. The first year, some 60 students were enrolled, and the curriculum consisted of classes in mathematics, English, science, chemistry, and physics. The year 1930 in spite of the fact that it was a depression year, the junior college was opened. At first, either terminal or preparatory courses were offered junior college students. The terminal courses provided a good many of the teachers. On the preparatory side, students were given training in liberal arts and pre-professional subjects, leading to law, medicine, engineering, and the like. E. Wayne Hilmer was the first dean. He held that position from 1930 through 1938. T. C. Ruggles followed, having a tenure of 17 years. Louis Robert Newsham followed Dean Ruggles, serving for a period of six years. Upon his resignation, Lyle Hellyer became dean, a position he held until 1970. The first facilities were in the old Centerville High School building. When that building was destroyed by fire in 1938, college students moved to the former James Bradley residence, located at the corner of 10th and Franklin, in Centerville. Classes were held there for sixteen school months, until the new Centerville High School building was completed in 1940. At that time, the college was moved back to the third floor of the high school, and the Dean's office was located there, as well. In the early 1960s the college moved to the 3rd floor of the Iowa Southern Utilities Building on the northeast corner of the Centerville Courthouse Square Historic District. In the fall of 1963, the former Bradley mansion on Drake Avenue, in Centerville, became the home for the college along with other buildings in other parts of town, as courses offered began to increase. The main college building on Drake Avenue was named Fannon Hall, in honor of Superintendent Fannon. Through the years of its existence the college was open except for one year, 1943-1944, during World War II. Young men were in service at that time, and the enrollment was so low that it was decided to close the school. As men began to return after their army service, enrollment under the GI Bill totaled 60 students, and the college was re-opened. In the late 1940s and early 1950s, the enrollment was 75 percent male, all under the GI Bill. The first class was graduated in 1932. At that time, fourteen students were given degrees. During the first years the number of freshmen was several times that of sophomores. Many took one year here, then went on to complete their courses elsewhere. On October 1, 1970 the college became the Centerville Campus of Indian Hills Community College when it merged as an Iowa Area XV Community College, which has its main campus located in Ottumwa, Iowa, known as the Ottumwa Campus of Indian Hills Community College. In 1970 the present Centerville Campus of Indian Hills Community College was built on North First Street in Centerville, Iowa.

== Athletics ==
The mascot name for Centerville Community College was the Maroons, later changed to the Golden Falcons. Rick Upchurch was a member of the football team in 1971 & 1972. And was wide-receiver/kick returner with The University of Minnesota Gophers in 1973 & 1974. He later played wide-receiver/kick returner for the Denver Broncos from 1975 to 1983, and awarded the "Offensive Rookie of the Year" in 1975. He played in four Pro Bowls, was selected to two NFL All decade teams as a kick returner, selected to the All-time NFL 25-year team and in 2000, was selected as one of the top 300 players of all time.
