= Eastern Conference (California) =

Junior college athletic conference in Southern California

The Eastern Conference was a junior college athletic conference with member schools located in Southern California that operated from 1932 to 1969. The conference's initial members included Fullerton Junior College—now known as Fullerton College—and Santa Ana College. Golden West College joined in 1966 and Cypress College joined in 1967. The conference was initially called the Orange Empire Conference and then the Eastern Division.

== Yearly football standings ==
1932 Orange Empire Conference football standings
	Conf.					Overall
Team	W		L		T	W		L		T
Riverside $	5	–	1	–	0	?	–	?	–	?
Fullerton	4	–	2	–	0	7	–	2	–	1
Chaffey	3	–	2	–	1	?	–	?	–	?
Citrus	3	–	3	–	0	4	–	3	–	2
Pomona Junior College	2	–	3	–	1	?	–	?	–	?
Santa Ana	2	–	4	–	0	7	–	4	–	0
San Bernardino	1	–	5	–	0	3	–	7	–	0
$ – Conference champion

1933 Eastern Conference (California) football standings
	Conf.					Overall
Team	W		L		T	W		L		T
Santa Ana $	5	–	1	–	0	7	–	1	–	3
Chaffey	4	–	1	–	1	?	–	?	–	?
Citrus	4	–	1	–	1	6	–	3	–	1
Riverside	4	–	2	–	0	?	–	?	–	?
Fullerton	2	–	4	–	0	4	–	4	–	1
San Bernardino	1	–	5	–	0	3	–	7	–	0
Pomona Junior College	0	–	6	–	0	?	–	?	–	?
$ – Conference champion

1934 Eastern Conference (California) football standings
	Conf.					Overall
Team	W		L		T	W		L		T
Riverside $	4	–	1	–	1	?	–	?	–	?
Santa Ana	3	–	0	–	3	5	–	3	–	3
Chaffey	4	–	2	–	0	?	–	?	–	?
Citrus	3	–	2	–	1	6	–	4	–	1
San Bernardino	2	–	3	–	1	4	–	5	–	1
Fullerton	2	–	4	–	0	2	–	6	–	1
Pomona Junior College	0	–	6	–	0	?	–	?	–	?
Conference championship game: Riverside 12, Santa Ana 0
$ – Conference champion

1935 Eastern Conference (California) football standings
	Conf.					Overall
Team	W		L		T	W		L		T
Riverside $	5	–	1	–	0	?	–	?	–	?
Citrus	4	–	2	–	0	5	–	3	–	1
Fullerton	3	–	3	–	0	5	–	3	–	1
Santa Ana	3	–	3	–	0	4	–	6	–	0
Chaffey	3	–	3	–	0	?	–	?	–	?
San Bernardino	2	–	4	–	0	5	–	4	–	0
Pomona Junior College	1	–	5	–	0	?	–	?	–	?
$ – Conference champion

1936 Eastern Conference (California) football standings
	Conf.					Overall
Team	W		L		T	W		L		T
Santa Ana $	6	–	0	–	0	10	–	1	–	0
Riverside	3	–	2	–	1	?	–	?	–	?
Chaffey	3	–	3	–	0	?	–	?	–	?
Citrus	3	–	3	–	0	4	–	5	–	0
Pomona Junior College	2	–	3	–	1	?	–	?	–	?
San Bernardino	2	–	4	–	0	3	–	6	–	0
Fullerton	0	–	5	–	1	1	–	8	–	1
$ – Conference champion

1937 Eastern Conference (California) football standings
	Conf.					Overall
Team	W		L		T	W		L		T
Santa Ana +	5	–	0	–	1	10	–	0	–	2
San Bernardino +	5	–	0	–	1	9	–	0	–	2
Pomona Junior College	4	–	2	–	0	?	–	?	–	?
Riverside	2	–	3	–	1	?	–	?	–	?
Fullerton	2	–	4	–	0	2	–	6	–	0
Citrus	1	–	5	–	0	1	–	7	–	0
Chaffey	0	–	5	–	1	?	–	?	–	?
Conference championship game: San Bernardino 6, Santa Ana 6
+ – Conference co-champions; Citrus forfeited a conference game to San Bernardino

1938 Eastern Conference (California) football standings
	Conf.					Overall
Team	W		L		T	W		L		T
San Bernardino $	6	–	0	–	0	9	–	2	–	0
Chaffey	5	–	1	–	0	6	–	2	–	1
Fullerton	3	–	2	–	1	6	–	2	–	1
Riverside	2	–	3	–	1	4	–	4	–	1
Santa Ana	1	–	2	–	3	3	–	3	–	5
Pomona Junior College	1	–	4	–	1	1	–	7	–	1
Citrus	0	–	6	–	0	0	–	7	–	0
$ – Conference champion

1939 Eastern Conference (California) football standings
	Conf.					Overall
Team	W		L		T	W		L		T
Chaffey $	5	–	0	–	0	?	–	?	–	?
Santa Ana	4	–	1	–	0	7	–	4	–	0
Riverside	3	–	2	–	0	?	–	?	–	?
Pomona Junior College	2	–	3	–	0	?	–	?	–	?
San Bernardino	1	–	4	–	0	4	–	6	–	0
Fullerton	0	–	5	–	0	1	–	9	–	0
$ – Conference champion

1940 Eastern Conference (California) football standings
	Conf.					Overall
Team	W		L		T	W		L		T
Santa Ana $	5	–	0	–	0	11	–	0	–	0
Fullerton	3	–	2	–	0	7	–	2	–	0
Chaffey	2	–	3	–	0	?	–	?	–	?
Riverside	2	–	3	–	0	?	–	?	–	?
San Bernardino	2	–	3	–	0	4	–	6	–	0
Pomona Junior College	1	–	4	–	0	?	–	?	–	?
$ – Conference champion

1941 Eastern Conference (California) football standings
	Conf.					Overall
Team	W		L		T	W		L		T
Santa Ana $	4	–	0	–	0	10	–	1	–	0
Fullerton	3	–	2	–	0	7	–	2	–	0
Riverside	2	–	2	–	1	5	–	3	–	1
Chaffey	2	–	2	–	1	2	–	5	–	1
San Bernardino	2	–	3	–	0	4	–	5	–	0
Pomona Junior College	0	–	4	–	0	0	–	8	–	0
$ – Conference champion

1942 Eastern Conference (California) football standings
	Conf.					Overall
Team	W		L		T	W		L		T
Santa Ana $	4	–	0	–	0	9	–	0	–	0
Fullerton	3	–	1	–	0	6	–	2	–	0
Pomona Junior College	1	–	3	–	0	?	–	?	–	?
Riverside	1	–	3	–	0	?	–	?	–	?
San Bernardino	1	–	3	–	0	5	–	4	–	0
$ – Conference champion

1946 Eastern Conference (California) football standings
	Conf.					Overall
Team	W		L		T	W		L		T
Chaffey $	4	–	0	–	1	?	–	?	–	?
Fullerton	2	–	1	–	2	3	–	4	–	2
Riverside	3	–	2	–	0	?	–	?	–	?
Santa Ana	2	–	3	–	0	8	–	3	–	0
San Bernardino	1	–	3	–	1	4	–	5	–	1
Mt. San Antonio	1	–	4	–	0	?	–	?	–	?
$ – Conference champion

1947 Eastern Conference (California) football standings
	Conf.					Overall
Team	W		L		T	W		L		T
Chaffey +	4	–	1	–	0	10	–	1	–	0
Mt. San Antonio +	4	–	1	–	0	?	–	?	–	?
Fullerton	3	–	2	–	0	7	–	3	–	0
Santa Ana	2	–	3	–	0	5	–	5	–	0
San Bernardino	1	–	4	–	0	3	–	7	–	0
Riverside	1	–	4	–	0	?	–	?	–	?
+ – Conference co-champions

1948 Eastern Conference (California) football standings
	Conf.					Overall
Team	W		L		T	W		L		T
Santa Ana $	6	–	0	–	0	10	–	1	–	0
Chaffey	5	–	1	–	0	?	–	?	–	?
Fullerton	4	–	2	–	0	7	–	2	–	1
San Bernardino	2	–	3	–	1	3	–	5	–	1
Orange Coast	2	–	4	–	0	3	–	5	–	1
Riverside	1	–	5	–	0	?	–	?	–	?
Mt. San Antonio	0	–	5	–	1	?	–	?	–	?
$ – Conference champion

1949 Eastern Conference (California) football standings
	Conf.					Overall
Team	W		L		T	W		L		T
Santa Ana $	6	–	0	–	0	9	–	1	–	1
Chaffey	5	–	1	–	0	?	–	?	–	?
Orange Coast	4	–	2	–	0	8	–	2	–	0
Mt. San Antonio	2	–	3	–	1	?	–	?	–	?
San Bernardino	1	–	4	–	1	3	–	5	–	1
Fullerton	1	–	4	–	1	2	–	7	–	1
Riverside	0	–	5	–	1	?	–	?	–	?
$ – Conference champion

1950 Eastern Conference (California) football standings
	Conf.					Overall
Team	W		L		T	W		L		T
Santa Ana $	5	–	0	–	1	6	–	2	–	2
Mt. San Antonio	4	–	2	–	0	7	–	2	–	0
Chaffey	4	–	2	–	0	6	–	4	–	0
Riverside	3	–	3	–	0	6	–	4	–	0
Fullerton	1	–	3	–	2	4	–	4	–	2
Orange Coast	1	–	4	–	1	3	–	6	–	1
San Bernardino	1	–	5	–	0	3	–	7	–	0
$ – Conference champion

1951 Eastern Conference (California) football standings
	Conf.					Overall
Team	W		L		T	W		L		T
Orange Coast $	6	–	0	–	0	7	–	3	–	0
Santa Ana	4	–	2	–	0	6	–	4	–	0
Riverside	4	–	2	–	0	5	–	4	–	0
Fullerton	2	–	4	–	0	4	–	6	–	0
Mt. San Antonio	2	–	4	–	0	3	–	6	–	0
San Bernardino	2	–	4	–	0	6	–	4	–	0
Chaffey	1	–	5	–	0	3	–	7	–	0
$ – Conference champion; San Bernardino forfeited games to Orange Coast, Santa Ana, Fullerton, and Chaffey.

1952 Eastern Conference (California) football standings
	Conf.					Overall
Team	W		L		T	W		L		T
San Bernardino $	5	–	1	–	0	8	–	1	–	1
Orange Coast	4	–	2	–	0	7	–	3	–	0
Mt. San Antonio	4	–	2	–	0	6	–	2	–	1
Fullerton	3	–	3	–	0	8	–	3	–	0
Santa Ana	3	–	3	–	0	6	–	4	–	1
Chaffey	1	–	5	–	0	3	–	8	–	0
Riverside	1	–	5	–	0	3	–	6	–	0
$ – Conference champion

1953 Eastern Conference (California) football standings
	Conf.					Overall
Team	W		L		T	W		L		T
Fullerton $	6	–	0	–	0	8	–	2	–	0
San Bernardino	4	–	2	–	0	6	–	5	–	1
Riverside	3	–	2	–	1	5	–	3	–	1
Orange Coast	3	–	3	–	0	6	–	4	–	0
Santa Ana	2	–	4	–	0	3	–	6	–	1
Mt. San Antonio	2	–	4	–	0	4	–	5	–	0
Chaffey	0	–	5	–	1	3	–	5	–	1
$ – Conference champion

1954 Eastern Conference (California) football standings
	Conf.					Overall
Team	W		L		T	W		L		T
Mt. San Antonio $	6	–	0	–	0	9	–	1	–	1
San Bernardino	5	–	1	–	0	7	–	3	–	1
Chaffey	4	–	2	–	0	4	–	6	–	0
Riverside	3	–	3	–	0	4	–	4	–	1
Fullerton	2	–	4	–	0	6	–	5	–	0
Santa Ana	1	–	5	–	0	3	–	7	–	0
Orange Coast	0	–	6	–	0	0	–	10	–	0
$ – Conference champion

1955 Eastern Conference (California) football standings
	Conf.					Overall
Team	W		L		T	W		L		T
Fullerton $	6	–	0	–	0	9	–	2	–	0
Mt. San Antonio	4	–	2	–	0	7	–	2	–	0
Orange Coast	3	–	3	–	0	3	–	5	–	1
San Bernardino	2	–	4	–	0	3	–	7	–	0
Chaffey	2	–	4	–	0	2	–	8	–	0
Santa Ana	2	–	4	–	0	2	–	8	–	0
Riverside	1	–	5	–	0	2	–	8	–	0
$ – Conference champion

1956 Eastern Conference (California) football standings
	Conf.					Overall
Team	W		L		T	W		L		T
Orange Coast $	4	–	0	–	2	7	–	1	–	2
Mt. San Antonio	4	–	1	–	1	6	–	2	–	1
San Bernardino	4	–	1	–	1	5	–	3	–	1
Fullerton	3	–	3	–	0	5	–	4	–	0
Santa Ana	2	–	4	–	0	3	–	6	–	0
Chaffey	1	–	4	–	1	3	–	5	–	1
Riverside	0	–	5	–	1	2	–	6	–	1
$ – Conference champion

1957 Eastern Conference (California) football standings
	Conf.					Overall
Team	W		L		T	W		L		T
Orange Coast $	6	–	1	–	0	8	–	1	–	0
Santa Ana	5	–	1	–	1	7	–	1	–	1
Riverside	4	–	3	–	0	4	–	4	–	1
Mt. San Antonio	3	–	3	–	1	4	–	4	–	1
Fullerton	3	–	4	–	0	4	–	4	–	1
Chaffey	2	–	4	–	1	4	–	4	–	1
Citrus	2	–	4	–	0	3	–	6	–	0
San Bernardino	0	–	5	–	1	2	–	6	–	1
$ – Conference champion

1958 Eastern Conference (California) football standings
	Conf.					Overall
Team	W		L		T	W		L		T
Riverside $	7	–	0	–	0	9	–	1	–	0
Mt. San Antonio	5	–	2	–	0	7	–	3	–	0
Santa Ana	5	–	2	–	0	7	–	2	–	0
Orange Coast	4	–	2	–	1	6	–	2	–	1
Chaffey	3	–	4	–	0	4	–	4	–	1
Fullerton	2	–	4	–	1	2	–	6	–	1
Citrus	1	–	6	–	0	2	–	7	–	0
San Bernardino	0	–	7	–	0	0	–	8	–	1
$ – Conference champion

1959 Eastern Conference (California) football standings
	Conf.					Overall
Team	W		L		T	W		L		T
San Bernardino +	5	–	1	–	1	8	–	1	–	1
Riverside +	5	–	1	–	1	7	–	1	–	1
Santa Ana	5	–	2	–	0	6	–	3	–	0
Mt. San Antonio	4	–	3	–	0	6	–	3	–	0
Chaffey	3	–	4	–	0	5	–	4	–	0
Citrus	2	–	5	–	0	4	–	5	–	0
Fullerton	2	–	5	–	0	2	–	7	–	0
Orange Coast	1	–	6	–	0	3	–	6	–	0
+ – Conference co-champions; Orange Coast forfeited a win over Citrus.

1960 Eastern Conference (California) football standings
	Conf.					Overall
Team	W		L		T	W		L		T
Riverside $	6	–	1	–	0	7	–	3	–	0
Mt. San Antonio	5	–	2	–	0	7	–	2	–	0
San Bernardino	5	–	2	–	0	6	–	3	–	0
Santa Ana	5	–	2	–	0	6	–	3	–	0
Chaffey	4	–	3	–	0	6	–	3	–	0
Fullerton	2	–	5	–	0	2	–	7	–	0
Citrus	1	–	6	–	0	3	–	6	–	0
Orange Coast	0	–	7	–	0	0	–	9	–	0
$ – Conference champion

1961 Eastern Conference (California) football standings
	Conf.					Overall
Team	W		L		T	W		L		T
Santa Ana $	6	–	0	–	1	7	–	1	–	1
Riverside	5	–	0	–	2	7	–	1	–	2
Fullerton	5	–	2	–	0	6	–	4	–	0
Mt. San Antonio	3	–	4	–	0	3	–	6	–	0
Chaffey	2	–	4	–	1	4	–	4	–	1
Orange Coast	2	–	4	–	1	4	–	4	–	1
San Bernardino	2	–	4	–	1	3	–	5	–	1
Citrus	0	–	7	–	0	1	–	8	–	0
$ – Conference champion

1962 Eastern Conference (California) football standings
	Conf.					Overall
Team	W		L		T	W		L		T
Santa Ana $	9	–	0	–	0	10	–	0	–	0
Orange Coast	8	–	1	–	0	9	–	1	–	0
Fullerton	6	–	2	–	1	6	–	2	–	1
Chaffey	6	–	3	–	0	6	–	3	–	0
Mt. San Antonio	5	–	3	–	1	5	–	3	–	1
San Bernardino	3	–	6	–	0	3	–	6	–	0
Riverside	3	–	6	–	0	3	–	6	–	0
Grossmont	2	–	7	–	0	2	–	7	–	0
Southwestern (CA)	1	–	8	–	0	1	–	8	–	0
Citrus	1	–	8	–	0	1	–	8	–	0
$ – Conference champion

1963 Eastern Conference (California) football standings
	Conf.					Overall
Team	W		L		T	W		L		T
Orange Coast $	9	–	0	–	0	10	–	0	–	0
Mt. San Antonio	8	–	1	–	0	8	–	2	–	0
San Bernardino	6	–	2	–	1	6	–	2	–	1
Chaffey	4	–	5	–	0	4	–	5	–	0
Riverside	4	–	5	–	0	4	–	5	–	0
Fullerton	3	–	5	–	1	3	–	5	–	1
Santa Ana	3	–	5	–	1	3	–	5	–	1
Grossmont	3	–	6	–	0	3	–	6	–	0
Southwestern (CA)	2	–	7	–	0	2	–	7	–	0
Citrus	1	–	7	–	1	1	–	7	–	1
$ – Conference champion

1964 Eastern Conference (California) football standings
	Conf.					Overall
Team	W		L		T	W		L		T
Fullerton $	7	–	0	–	0	8	–	2	–	0
Orange Coast	5	–	2	–	0	6	–	4	–	0
Santa Ana	5	–	2	–	0	5	–	4	–	0
Mt. San Antonio	4	–	3	–	0	5	–	3	–	1
San Bernardino	3	–	4	–	0	5	–	4	–	0
Citrus	2	–	5	–	0	3	–	6	–	0
Chaffey	2	–	5	–	0	2	–	7	–	0
Riverside	0	–	7	–	0	0	–	9	–	0
$ – Conference champion

1965 Eastern Conference (California) football standings
	Conf.					Overall
Team	W		L		T	W		L		T
Fullerton $	7	–	0	–	0	10	–	0	–	0
Santa Ana	5	–	2	–	0	7	–	2	–	1
Riverside	5	–	2	–	0	6	–	3	–	0
Mt. San Antonio	4	–	3	–	0	4	–	5	–	0
Orange Coast	3	–	4	–	0	4	–	5	–	0
Chaffey	2	–	5	–	0	3	–	6	–	0
San Bernardino	1	–	6	–	0	1	–	8	–	0
Citrus	1	–	6	–	0	1	–	8	–	0
$ – Conference champion

1966 Eastern Conference (California) football standings
	Conf.					Overall
Team	W		L		T	W		L		T
Fullerton $	7	–	0	–	0	9	–	0	–	1
Riverside	4	–	3	–	0	6	–	3	–	0
San Bernardino	4	–	3	–	0	6	–	4	–	0
Orange Coast	4	–	3	–	0	4	–	5	–	0
Golden West	3	–	3	–	1	5	–	3	–	1
Chaffey	2	–	5	–	0	4	–	5	–	0
Santa Ana	2	–	5	–	0	3	–	6	–	0
Mt. San Antonio	1	–	5	–	1	2	–	6	–	1
$ – Conference champion

1967 Eastern Conference (California) football standings
	Conf.					Overall
Team	W		L		T	W		L		T
Fullerton $^	8	–	0	–	0	12	–	0	–	0
Mt. San Antonio	7	–	1	–	0	7	–	2	–	0
Orange Coast	6	–	2	–	0	6	–	3	–	0
Golden West	4	–	4	–	0	5	–	4	–	0
Santa Ana	4	–	4	–	0	5	–	4	–	0
San Bernardino	3	–	5	–	0	3	–	6	–	0
Riverside	3	–	5	–	0	4	–	5	–	0
Cypress	1	–	7	–	0	1	–	8	–	0
Chaffey	0	–	8	–	0	0	–	9	–	0
$ – Conference champion; ^ – California state junior college large division playoff participant
