= Chaffey College =

Community college in Rancho Cucamonga, California, US

- Type: Public community college
- Established: 1883
- Budget: $445 million
- President: Henry D. Shannon, Ph.D.
- Students: 28,000 annually
- Undergraduates: 28,000 annually
- Location: Rancho Cucamonga, California, United States; 34.147°N 117.570°W
- Campus: Suburban
- Colors: Red, black, and white
- Nickname: Panthers
- Mascots: Rocky and Roxy
- Website: www.chaffey.edu

Chaffey College is a public community college in Rancho Cucamonga, California, United States. It serves students in Chino, Chino Hills, Fontana, Montclair, Ontario, Rancho Cucamonga and Upland. It is the oldest community college in California.

== History ==
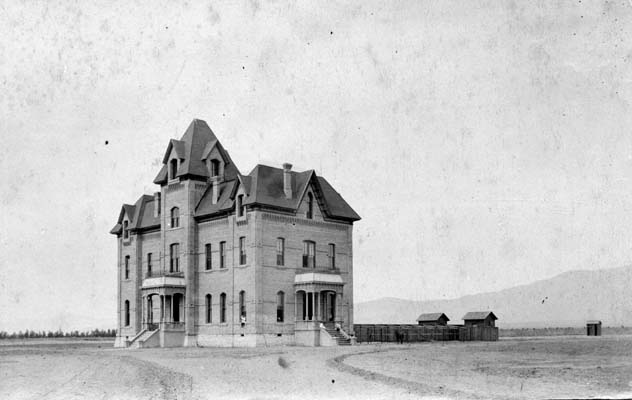
Chaffey College of Agriculture, 1885

The school was established in Ontario, California, in 1883, when city founders and brothers George and William Chaffey donated land and established an endowment for a private college. The private school was founded as the Chaffey College of Agriculture through the University of Southern California; USC, also a private university, had been founded three years earlier in nearby Los Angeles. The cornerstone of the new school was laid on March 17, 1883, at Fourth and Euclid in Ontario; it opened on October 15, 1885. The original institution included a secondary school and was run by USC until 1901. During this period, Chaffey's football team had a 1–1 series with the young USC football team, winning 32–6 in 1893 and losing 38–0 in 1897.

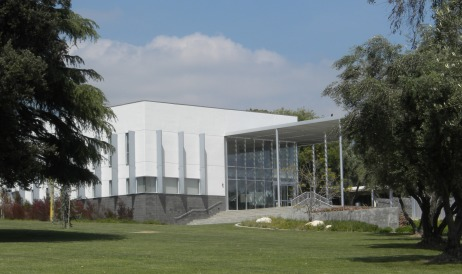
Student Services Administration Building

Financial troubles forced the school to close in 1901. The building was taken over by the city and became the home of Ontario High School (now Chaffey High School). In 1906 the Chaffey endowment was legally separated from USC and reorganized to benefit the newly created Chaffey Union High School District. When Ontario High school opened to students from Upland in 1911, its present name was adopted. In 1916, the Chaffey Junior College of Agriculture was added as a postgraduate department to the high school. The school's buildings were renovated and additional buildings added during the New Deal.

A separate junior college district was created in 1922 and in 1957 bonds were approved in support of a complete separation of the high school and college facilities. The current location in Rancho Cucamonga opened in the spring of 1960. The college's mascot is the Panther.

President Bill Clinton visited Chaffey in 1996, announcing a proposal to finance two years of community college education to expand the basic education of all Americans to 14 years. Chaffey launched its online education program in 1999.

Voters in 2002 approved the Measure L bond, providing up to $230 million in bonds during a 10-year period for the Facilities Master Plan. Through Measure L, Chaffey built its Chino campus in 2002 and expanded the Fontana campus, which opened in 1996. In 2017, Chaffey was named a top 10 community college in the nation by the Aspen Institute. Philanthropist MacKenzie Scott gave Chaffey $25 million in 2021 because of its dedication to equity.

The college’s passage of Measure P in 2018 allowed Chaffey to make repairs, upgrades and improvements at its three campuses. Plans are under way to build a fourth campus in Ontario.

== Academics ==
Chaffey offers associate degrees and certificates. Chaffey offers one of the oldest aviation programs in the United States.

Undergraduate demographics as of fall 2023
| Race and ethnicity | Total |
|---|---|
| Hispanic | 63% |
| White | 14% |
| Asian | 7% |
| Black | 7% |
| International student | 3% |
| Two or more races | 3% |
| Unknown | 3% |
Economic diversity
| Low-income (Note: The percentage of students who received an income-based federal Pell grant intended for low-income students.) | 33% |
| Affluent (Note: The percentage of students who are a part of the American middle class at the bare minimum.) | 67% |

== Athletics ==
The college athletic teams are nicknamed the Panthers. Teams compete in the Inland Empire Athletic Conference and National Central Conference annually.

| Men's sports | Women's sports |
|---|---|
| Baseball | Basketball |
| Basketball | Cross country |
| Cross country | Soccer |
| Football | Softball |
| Soccer | Swimming & diving |
| Swimming & diving | Volleyball |
| Water polo | Water polo |

== Notable people ==
- Hobart Alter, pioneer in surfboard shaping industry, creator of Hobie Cat and founder of the Hobie Company
- Ken Calvert, member of United States Congress, 41st District (Corona)
- Beverly Cleary, author and recipient of 1984 Newbery Medal
- Stewart Donaldson, author, positive psychologist, evaluation scientist
- Skip Ewing, country music star
- Rollie Fingers, Major League Baseball pitcher, (Hall of Fame)
- Darryl Kile, Major League Baseball pitcher (St. Louis Cardinals)
- Terry Kirkman, founding member of the band The Association
- Gloria Negrete McLeod, former United States representative
- Robert Lyn Nelson, marine painter
- Meagan Tandy, Miss California USA 2007
- Joseph Wambaugh, author of novels often involving the Los Angeles Police Department
- Frank Zappa (one semester), musician
