= 1968 junior college football season =

American junior college football season

- National Championship: Shrine Bowl, Savannah, GA (NJCAA)
- Champion(s): El Camino, Jones County (Gridwire); Ferrum (NJCAA)

The 1968 junior college football season was the season of intercollegiate junior college football running from September to December 1968. Ferrum won the NJCAA National Football Championship, defeating Phoenix in the Shrine Bowl in Savannah, Georgia. Jones County and El Camino tied for the top spot in Gridwire's final junior college rankings.

Fresno City won the California state junior college large division playoffs, defeating East Los Angeles in the championship game, while Redwoods won the California state junior college small division playoffs, beating Coalinga in the title game.

== Conference standings ==
=== California ===
==== Large division ====
1968 Camino Norte Conference football standings
	Conf.					Overall
Team	W		L		T	W		L		T
Marin +^	4	–	1	–	0	7	–	3	–	0
De Anza +^	4	–	1	–	0	5	–	5	–	0
West Valley	3	–	2	–	0	6	–	3	–	0
Contra Costa	3	–	2	–	0	5	–	4	–	0
Solano	1	–	4	–	0	3	–	6	–	0
Santa Rosa	0	–	5	–	0	3	–	6	–	0
+ – Conference co-champions; ^ – California state junior college large division playoff participant

1968 Golden Gate Conference football standings
	Conf.					Overall
Team	W		L		T	W		L		T
Diablo Valley $^	6	–	0	–	0	8	–	2	–	0
San Jose City	5	–	1	–	0	6	–	3	–	0
CC of San Francisco	4	–	2	–	0	7	–	2	–	0
Merritt	2	–	4	–	0	4	–	5	–	0
Chabot	2	–	4	–	0	2	–	7	–	0
San Mateo	1	–	4	–	1	1	–	7	–	1
Foothill	0	–	5	–	1	1	–	7	–	1
Laney			–			6	–	3	–	0
$ – Conference champion; ^ – California state junior college large division playoff participant

1968 Metropolitan Conference football standings
	Conf.					Overall
Team	W		L		T	W		L		T
El Camino $^	7	–	0	–	0	10	–	1	–	0
Bakersfield	6	–	1	–	0	8	–	1	–	0
Long Beach	5	–	2	–	0	6	–	2	–	1
Santa Monica	4	–	3	–	0	6	–	3	–	0
Cerritos	3	–	4	–	0	3	–	6	–	0
Pasadena	1	–	6	–	0	3	–	6	–	0
Los Angeles Valley	1	–	6	–	0	2	–	7	–	0
Pierce	1	–	6	–	0	1	–	8	–	0
$ – Conference champion; ^ – California state junior college large division playoff participant

1968 South Coast Conference (California) football standings
	Conf.					Overall
Team	W		L		T	W		L		T
San Diego City $^	7	–	0	–	0	9	–	1	–	0
Fullerton	6	–	1	–	0	8	–	1	–	0
Santa Ana	5	–	2	–	0	7	–	2	–	0
Golden West	4	–	3	–	0	5	–	4	–	0
Orange Coast	3	–	4	–	0	5	–	4	–	0
San Diego Mesa	2	–	5	–	0	4	–	5	–	0
Mt. San Antonio	0	–	6	–	1	1	–	6	–	2
Rio Hondo	0	–	6	–	1	0	–	8	–	1
$ – Conference champion; ^ – California state junior college large division playoff participant

1968 Southeastern Conference (California) football standings
	Conf.					Overall
Team	W		L		T	W		L		T
Citrus $^	6	–	1	–	0	9	–	2	–	0
Palomar	5	–	2	–	0	7	–	2	–	0
Grossmont	5	–	2	–	0	5	–	4	–	0
Riverside	5	–	2	–	0	5	–	4	–	0
Cypress	3	–	4	–	0	3	–	6	–	0
Chaffey	2	–	5	–	0	4	–	5	–	0
San Bernardino	1	–	6	–	0	1	–	8	–	0
Southwestern (CA)	1	–	6	–	0	1	–	8	–	0
$ – Conference champion; ^ – California state junior college large division playoff participant

1968 Valley Conference football standings
	Conf.					Overall
Team	W		L		T	W		L		T
Fresno City $^	5	–	0	–	0	10	–	2	–	0
Sequoias	4	–	1	–	0	7	–	2	–	0
Sacramento City	3	–	2	–	0	7	–	2	–	0
San Joaquin Delta	1	–	3	–	1	3	–	5	–	1
American River	1	–	4	–	0	2	–	7	–	0
Modesto	0	–	4	–	1	0	–	8	–	1
$ – Conference champion; ^ – California state junior college large division playoff participant

1968 Western State Conference football standings
	Conf.					Overall
Team	W		L		T	W		L		T
East Los Angeles $^	7	–	0	–	0	11	–	1	–	0
Ventura	6	–	1	–	0	7	–	1	–	1
Los Angeles City	5	–	2	–	0	6	–	3	–	0
Harbor	4	–	3	–	0	5	–	4	–	0
Glendale (CA)	3	–	4	–	0	3	–	6	–	0
Moorpark	2	–	5	–	0	3	–	6	–	0
Compton	1	–	6	–	0	2	–	7	–	0
Santa Barbara City	0	–	7	–	0	1	–	8	–	0
$ – Conference champion; ^ – California state junior college large division playoff participant

==== Small division ====
1968 Central Conference football standings
	Conf.					Overall
Team	W		L		T	W		L		T
Coalinga $^	5	–	0	–	0	6	–	5	–	0
Merced	3	–	2	–	0	5	–	4	–	0
Reedley	3	–	2	–	0	4	–	4	–	0
Cuesta	2	–	3	–	0	4	–	4	–	0
Hancock	1	–	4	–	0	3	–	6	–	0
Porterville	1	–	4	–	0	1	–	8	–	0
$ – Conference champion; ^ – California state junior college small division playoff participant

1968 Coast Conference football standings
	Conf.					Overall
Team	W		L		T	W		L		T
Hartnell +^	4	–	1	–	0	7	–	3	–	0
Gavilan +	4	–	1	–	0	8	–	1	–	0
Cabrillo	3	–	2	–	0	5	–	4	–	0
Monterey Peninsula	3	–	2	–	0	4	–	4	–	1
Menlo	1	–	4	–	0	1	–	7	–	0
Ohlone	0	–	5	–	0	0	–	9	–	0
+ – Conference co-champions; ^ – California state junior college small division playoff participant

1968 Desert Conference football standings
	Conf.					Overall
Team	W		L		T	W		L		T
MiraCosta $^	7	–	0	–	0	8	–	2	–	0
Antelope Valley	6	–	1	–	0	7	–	2	–	0
Mt. San Jacinto	5	–	2	–	0	7	–	2	–	0
Barstow	4	–	3	–	0	5	–	4	–	0
Imperial Valley	3	–	4	–	0	4	–	5	–	0
Desert	2	–	5	–	0	3	–	6	–	0
Palo Verde	1	–	6	–	0	2	–	7	–	0
Victor Valley	0	–	7	–	0	0	–	9	–	0
$ – Conference champion; ^ – California state junior college small division playoff participant

1968 Golden Valley Conference football standings
	Conf.					Overall
Team	W		L		T	W		L		T
Redwoods $^	5	–	0	–	0	10	–	1	–	0
Yuba	4	–	1	–	0	7	–	2	–	0
Sierra	3	–	2	–	0	6	–	3	–	0
Butte	1	–	3	–	1	3	–	5	–	1
Shasta	1	–	3	–	1	1	–	7	–	1
Napa	0	–	5	–	0	1	–	7	–	0
Siskiyous			–			5	–	0	–	0
$ – Conference champion; ^ – California state junior college small division playoff participant

=== NCJAA ===
1968 Arizona Junior College Athletic Conference football standings
	Conf.					Overall
Team	W		L		T	W		L		T
Phoenix $	4	–	0	–	0	8	–	2	–	0
Arizona Western	3	–	1	–	0	8	–	2	–	0
Eastern Arizona	1	–	3	–	0	4	–	5	–	0
Glendale (AZ)	1	–	3	–	0	4	–	5	–	0
Mesa (AZ)	1	–	3	–	0	4	–	5	–	0
$ – Conference champion

1968 Intermountain Collegiate Athletic Conference football standings
	Conf.					Overall
Team	W		L		T	W		L		T
Mesa (CO) +	2	–	1	–	0	8	–	2	–	0
Ricks +	2	–	1	–	0	6	–	3	–	0
Dixie (UT) +	2	–	1	–	0	4	–	4	–	0
Snow	0	–	3	–	0	0	–	9	–	0
+ – Conference co-champions

1968 Mississippi Junior College Conference football standings
	Conf.					Overall
Team	W		L		T	W		L		T
Jones County $	9	–	0	–	0	9	–	0	–	0
Perkinston	8	–	1	–	0	9	–	1	–	0
East Mississippi	7	–	2	–	0	7	–	2	–	0
Holmes	6	–	3	–	0	6	–	3	–	0
Pearl River	5	–	4	–	0	5	–	4	–	0
Mississippi Delta	5	–	5	–	0	5	–	5	–	0
Southwest Mississippi	5	–	5	–	0	5	–	5	–	0
Northeast Mississippi	4	–	5	–	0	4	–	5	–	0
East Central (MS)	3	–	5	–	1	3	–	5	–	1
Northwest Mississippi	3	–	6	–	0	3	–	6	–	0
Copiah–Lincoln	3	–	6	–	0	3	–	6	–	0
Itawamba	1	–	7	–	1	1	–	7	–	1
Hinds	0	–	9	–	0	0	–	9	–	0
$ – Conference champion

1968 Northern Illinois Junior College Conference football standings
	Conf.					Overall
Team	W		L		T	W		L		T
Wilson +	5	–	1	–	0	7	–	2	–	0
Wright +	5	–	1	–	0	6	–	2	–	0
Thornton	4	–	2	–	0	5	–	3	–	0
DuPage	4	–	2	–	0	5	–	4	–	0
Morton	2	–	4	–	0	3	–	5	–	0
Joliet	1	–	5	–	0	1	–	7	–	0
Rock Valley	0	–	6	–	0	0	–	9	–	0
+ – Conference co-champions

1968 Texas Junior College Football Federation standings
	Conf.					Overall
Team	W		L		T	W		L		T
Henderson County +	6	–	1	–	0	8	–	3	–	0
Kilgore +	6	–	1	–	0	7	–	3	–	0
Blinn	5	–	2	–	0	6	–	3	–	0
Tyler	3	–	4	–	0	5	–	5	–	0
Navarro	3	–	4	–	0	3	–	7	–	0
Cisco	2	–	5	–	0	4	–	6	–	0
Wharton	2	–	5	–	0	4	–	6	–	0
Ranger	1	–	6	–	0	1	–	8	–	0
+ – Conference co-champions

1968 Tri-State Junior College Conference football standings
	Conf.					Overall
Team	W		L		T	W		L		T
Ellsworth $	5	–	0	–	0	9	–	1	–	0
Centerville	4	–	1	–	0	?	–	?	–	?
Iowa Central	3	–	2	–	0	?	–	?	–	?
North Iowa	2	–	3	–	0	?	–	?	–	?
Marshalltown	1	–	4	–	0	?	–	?	–	?
Norfolk	0	–	5	–	0	?	–	?	–	?
$ – Conference champion

1968 Washington Community College Conference football standings
	Conf.					Overall
Team	W		L		T	W		L		T
Spokane $	7	–	0	–	0	8	–	0	–	0
Everett	5	–	1	–	1	7	–	1	–	1
Grays Harbor	4	–	3	–	0	5	–	4	–	0
Columbia Basin	3	–	3	–	1	4	–	4	–	1
Wenatchee Valley	3	–	4	–	0	4	–	5	–	0
Yakima	2	–	4	–	1	2	–	6	–	1
Shoreline	2	–	5	–	0	2	–	7	–	0
Olympic	0	–	6	–	1	1	–	7	–	1
$ – Conference champion

== California state playoffs ==
=== Large division ===
Quarterfinals; November 28, 30
Marin	13
Fresno City	20
Diablo Valley	12
El Camino	37
De Anza	20
Citrus	45
San Diego City	7
East Los Angeles	17

Semifinals; December 7
Fresno City	25
El Camino	8
Citrus	16
East Los Angeles	17

Championship game December 14; Ratcliffe Stadium—Fresno, California
Fresno City	16
East Los Angeles	7

=== Small division ===
Semifinals; November 30
Hartnell	41
Coalinga	43
MiraCosta	8
Redwoods	36

Championship game December 7 Memorial Stadium—Coalinga, CA
Coalinga	28
Redwoods	51
