= 1970 junior college football season =

American junior college football season

- National Championship: Shrine Bowl, Savannah, GA (NJCAA)
- Champion(s): Fort Scott (NJCAA)

The 1970 junior college football season was the season of intercollegiate junior college football running from September to December 1970. Fort Scott won the NJCAA National Football Championship, defeating the Mesa Hokams in the Shrine Bowl in Savannah, Georgia.

Sequoias won the California state junior college large division playoffs, defeating Fullerton in the championship game at Bakersfield College Stadium in Bakersfield, California, while Redwoods won the California state junior college small division playoffs, beating Reedley in the title game at Redwood Bowl in Arcata, California.

== Conference standings ==
=== California ===
==== Large division ====
1970 Camino Norte Conference football standings
	Conf.					Overall
Team	W		L		T	W		L		T
West Valley $^	5	–	0	–	0	9	–	1	–	0
Santa Rosa	4	–	1	–	0	7	–	2	–	0
De Anza	3	–	2	–	0	4	–	5	–	0
Solano	2	–	3	–	0	4	–	5	–	0
Contra Costa	1	–	4	–	0	1	–	8	–	0
Marin	0	–	5	–	0	1	–	8	–	0
$ – Conference champion; ^ – California state junior college large division playoff participant

1970 Golden Gate Conference football standings
	Conf.					Overall
Team	W		L		T	W		L		T
Chabot $^	6	–	0	–	1	9	–	1	–	1
San Mateo	5	–	1	–	1	?	–	?	–	?
Foothill	4	–	3	–	0	?	–	?	–	?
San Jose City	4	–	3	–	0	?	–	?	–	?
Diablo Valley	3	–	4	–	0	5	–	4	–	0
CC of San Francisco	2	–	5	–	0	?	–	?	–	?
Laney	2	–	5	–	0	?	–	?	–	?
Merritt	1	–	6	–	0	?	–	?	–	?
$ – Conference champion; ^ – California state junior college large division playoff participant Diablo Valley forfeited conference wins over Foothill, Laney, and Merritt.

1970 Metropolitan Conference football standings
	Conf.					Overall
Team	W		L		T	W		L		T
Bakersfield $^	6	–	0	–	0	9	–	1	–	0
El Camino	4	–	2	–	0	6	–	3	–	0
Santa Monica	4	–	2	–	0	6	–	3	–	0
Pasadena	3	–	3	–	0	6	–	3	–	0
Pierce	3	–	3	–	0	4	–	5	–	0
Los Angeles Valley	1	–	5	–	0	2	–	7	–	0
Long Beach	0	–	6	–	0	0	–	9	–	0
$ – Conference champion; ^ – California state junior college large division playoff participant

1970 Mission Conference football standings
	Conf.					Overall
Team	W		L		T	W		L		T
Saddleback $^	6	–	0	–	1	8	–	1	–	1
Riverside	5	–	2	–	0	7	–	2	–	0
Grossmont	4	–	3	–	0	5	–	4	–	0
Citrus	3	–	3	–	1	4	–	4	–	1
Chaffey	3	–	4	–	0	4	–	5	–	0
Southwestern (CA)	2	–	5	–	0	4	–	5	–	0
Palomar	2	–	5	–	0	3	–	6	–	0
San Bernardino	2	–	5	–	0	3	–	6	–	0
$ – Conference champion; ^ – California state junior college large division playoff participant

1970 South Coast Conference (California) football standings
	Conf.					Overall
Team	W		L		T	W		L		T
Fullerton $^	6	–	0	–	0	11	–	1	–	0
Orange Coast	5	–	1	–	0	6	–	3	–	0
San Diego Mesa	3	–	3	–	0	6	–	3	–	0
Santa Ana	3	–	3	–	0	4	–	5	–	0
Cerritos	2	–	4	–	0	4	–	5	–	0
Mt. San Antonio	2	–	4	–	0	4	–	5	–	0
San Diego City	0	–	6	–	0	0	–	7	–	0
$ – Conference champion; ^ – California state junior college large division playoff participant

1970 Southern California Conference football standings
	Conf.					Overall
Team	W		L		T	W		L		T
Rio Hondo $^	5	–	0	–	0	9	–	2	–	0
Los Angeles City	4	–	1	–	0	7	–	2	–	0
East Los Angeles	3	–	2	–	0	5	–	3	–	0
Cypress	2	–	3	–	0	2	–	7	–	0
Golden West	1	–	4	–	0	4	–	5	–	0
Harbor	0	–	5	–	0	1	–	8	–	0
$ – Conference champion; ^ – California state junior college large division playoff participant

1970 Valley Conference football standings
	Conf.					Overall
Team	W		L		T	W		L		T
Sequoias $^	4	–	1	–	0	10	–	2	–	0
Fresno City	3	–	2	–	0	?	–	?	–	?
American River	3	–	2	–	0	?	–	?	–	?
Sacramento City	3	–	2	–	0	?	–	?	–	?
Modesto	2	–	3	–	0	?	–	?	–	?
San Joaquin Delta	0	–	5	–	0	?	–	?	–	?
$ – Conference champion; ^ – California state junior college large division playoff participant

1970 Western State Conference football standings
	Conf.					Overall
Team	W		L		T	W		L		T
Moorpark +	4	–	2	–	0	6	–	2	–	0
Santa Barbara City +^	4	–	2	–	0	5	–	5	–	0
Compton +	4	–	2	–	0	4	–	5	–	0
West Los Angeles	3	–	3	–	0	6	–	3	–	0
Ventura	3	–	3	–	0	4	–	5	–	0
Glendale (CA)	2	–	4	–	0	2	–	7	–	0
Antelope Valley	1	–	5	–	0	3	–	6	–	0
+ – Conference co-champions; ^ – California state junior college large division playoff participant

==== Small division ====
1970 Central Conference football standings
	Conf.					Overall
Team	W		L		T	W		L		T
Reedley $^	5	–	0	–	0	10	–	1	–	0
Hancock	4	–	1	–	0	6	–	2	–	0
Porterville	3	–	2	–	0	5	–	4	–	0
West Hills	2	–	3	–	0	5	–	4	–	0
Cuesta	1	–	4	–	0	2	–	7	–	0
Merced	0	–	5	–	0	2	–	7	–	0
$ – Conference champion; ^ – California state junior college small division playoff participant

1970 Coast Conference football standings
	Conf.					Overall
Team	W		L		T	W		L		T
Gavilan $^	5	–	0	–	0	9	–	1	–	0
Hartnell	4	–	1	–	0	?	–	?	–	?
Monterey Peninsula	3	–	2	–	0	?	–	?	–	?
Cabrillo	2	–	3	–	0	?	–	?	–	?
Ohlone	1	–	4	–	0	?	–	?	–	?
Menlo	0	–	5	–	0	?	–	?	–	?
$ – Conference champion; ^ – California state junior college small division playoff participant

1970 Desert Conference football standings
	Conf.					Overall
Team	W		L		T	W		L		T
Victor Valley $^	6	–	1	–	0	7	–	2	–	0
College of the Canyons	5	–	2	–	0	7	–	2	–	0
Mt. San Jacinto	4	–	3	–	0	5	–	4	–	0
MiraCosta	4	–	3	–	0	4	–	5	–	0
Palo Verde	3	–	4	–	0	5	–	4	–	0
Desert	3	–	4	–	0	4	–	5	–	0
Imperial Valley	2	–	5	–	0	2	–	7	–	0
Barstow	1	–	6	–	0	1	–	8	–	0
$ – Conference champion; ^ – California state junior college small division playoff participant Desert forfeited conference wins over Victor Valley, Mt. San Jacinto, Palo Verde, and Barstow.

1970 Golden Valley Conference football standings
	Conf.					Overall
Team	W		L		T	W		L		T
Redwoods $^	6	–	0	–	0	11	–	0	–	0
Butte	4	–	2	–	0	5	–	4	–	0
Shasta	3	–	2	–	1	4	–	4	–	1
Sierra	3	–	3	–	0	5	–	4	–	0
Yuba	2	–	3	–	1	3	–	5	–	1
Siskiyous	1	–	5	–	0	3	–	6	–	0
Napa	1	–	5	–	0	2	–	7	–	0
$ – Conference champion; ^ – California state junior college small division playoff participant

=== NCJAA ===
1970 Arizona Junior College Athletic Conference football standings
	Conf.					Overall
Team	W		L		T	W		L		T
Mesa (AZ) $	4	–	0	–	0	10	–	1	–	0
Arizona Western	3	–	1	–	0	9	–	1	–	0
Phoenix	2	–	2	–	0	5	–	4	–	0
Eastern Arizona	1	–	3	–	0	4	–	5	–	0
Glendale (AZ)	0	–	4	–	0	1	–	8	–	0
$ – Conference champion

1970 Intermountain Collegiate Athletic Conference football standings
	Conf.					Overall
Team	W		L		T	W		L		T
Mesa (CO) $	3	–	0	–	0	4	–	6	–	0
Ricks	2	–	1	–	0	5	–	4	–	0
Snow	1	–	2	–	0	4	–	5	–	1
Dixie (UT)	0	–	3	–	0	?	–	?	–	?
$ – Conference champion

1970 Iowa Junior College Conference football standings
	Conf.					Overall
Team	W		L		T	W		L		T
Ellsworth $	4	–	1	–	0	6	–	3	–	0
Centerville	3	–	1	–	1	5	–	3	–	1
Iowa Central	3	–	1	–	1	5	–	3	–	1
Marshalltown	2	–	3	–	0	5	–	3	–	0
North Iowa Area	1	–	4	–	0	2	–	5	–	0
Iowa Lakes	1	–	4	–	0	1	–	6	–	1
Waldorf	0	–	0	–	0	4	–	3	–	0
$ – Conference champion

1970 Kansas Jayhawk Junior College Conference football standings
	Conf.					Overall
Team	W		L		T	W		L		T
Fort Scott $	8	–	0	–	0	11	–	0	–	0
Hutchinson	7	–	1	–	0	9	–	1	–	1
Garden City	6	–	2	–	0	7	–	3	–	0
Pratt	5	–	3	–	0	6	–	4	–	0
Cowley County	4	–	4	–	0	6	–	4	–	0
Butler County	3	–	5	–	0	4	–	6	–	0
Independence	1	–	7	–	0	2	–	8	–	0
Highland (KS)	1	–	7	–	0	1	–	8	–	0
Coffeyville	1	–	7	–	0	1	–	9	–	0
Dodge City *	0	–	0	–	0	4	–	5	–	0
$ – Conference champion; * Dodge City was on probation.

1970 Mississippi Junior College Conference football standings
	Conf.					Overall
Team	W		L		T	W		L		T
North Division
East Mississippi x	5	–	1	–	0	7	–	3	–	0
East Central (MS) xy	5	–	1	–	0	7	–	4	–	0
Northeast Mississippi	3	–	3	–	0	4	–	6	–	0
Mississippi Delta	2	–	3	–	0	2	–	6	–	1
Holmes	2	–	4	–	0	3	–	7	–	0
Northwest Mississippi	2	–	4	–	0	2	–	8	–	0
Itawamba	1	–	4	–	0	1	–	8	–	0
South Division
Pearl River xy$	4	–	1	–	0	9	–	2	–	0
Copiah–Lincoln	3	–	1	–	1	7	–	0	–	2
Mississippi Gulf Coast	3	–	1	–	1	9	–	2	–	1
Jones County	2	–	1	–	2	6	–	2	–	2
Southwest Mississippi	1	–	4	–	0	3	–	6	–	0
Hinds	0	–	5	–	0	2	–	8	–	0
Championship: Pearl River 27, East Central 8
$ – Conference champion; x – Division champion/co-champions

1970 Northwest Community College Conference football standings
	Conf.					Overall
Team	W		L		T	W		L		T
Eastern Division
Columbia Basin xy$	7	–	1	–	0	9	–	1	–	0
Spokane Falls	5	–	3	–	0	6	–	3	–	0
Yakima	5	–	3	–	0	6	–	3	–	0
Walla Walla	2	–	6	–	0	3	–	6	–	0
Wenatchee Valley	2	–	6	–	0	3	–	6	–	0
Western Division
Grays Harbor xy	7	–	1	–	0	8	–	2	–	0
Everett	5	–	3	–	0	5	–	4	–	0
Mt. Hood	2	–	6	–	0	2	–	7	–	0
Olympic	1	–	7	–	0	2	–	7	–	0
NWCCC championship game: Columbia Basin 26, Grays Harbor 14
$ – Conference champion; x – Division champion/co-champions; y – Championship game participant

1970 Texas Junior College Football Federation standings
	Conf.					Overall
Team	W		L		T	W		L		T
Kilgore $	6	–	0	–	1	7	–	2	–	1
Navarro	6	–	1	–	0	11	–	1	–	0
Tyler	5	–	1	–	1	7	–	2	–	1
Henderson County	4	–	3	–	0	4	–	6	–	0
Blinn	3	–	4	–	0	5	–	5	–	0
Wharton	2	–	5	–	0	2	–	7	–	1
Cisco	1	–	6	–	0	3	–	7	–	0
Ranger	0	–	7	–	0	2	–	8	–	0
$ – Conference champion

== California state playoffs ==
=== Large division ===
Quarterfinals; November 28
Bakersfield	0
Fullerton	6
Saddleback	14
Rio Hondo	17
Sequoias	34
West Valley	6
Chabot	43
Santa Barbara City	0

Semifinals; December 5
Fullerton	13
Rio Hondo	7
Sequoias	13
Chabot	10

Championship game December 12; Bakersfield College Stadium—Bakersfield, California
Fullerton	21
Sequoias	24

=== Small division ===
Semifinals; November 28
Victor Valley	0
Reedley	49
Gavilan	7
Redwoods	14

Championship game December 5 Redwood Bowl—Arcata, CA
Reedley	28
Redwoods	41
