= Jim Powers (American football) =

American football player (1928–2013)

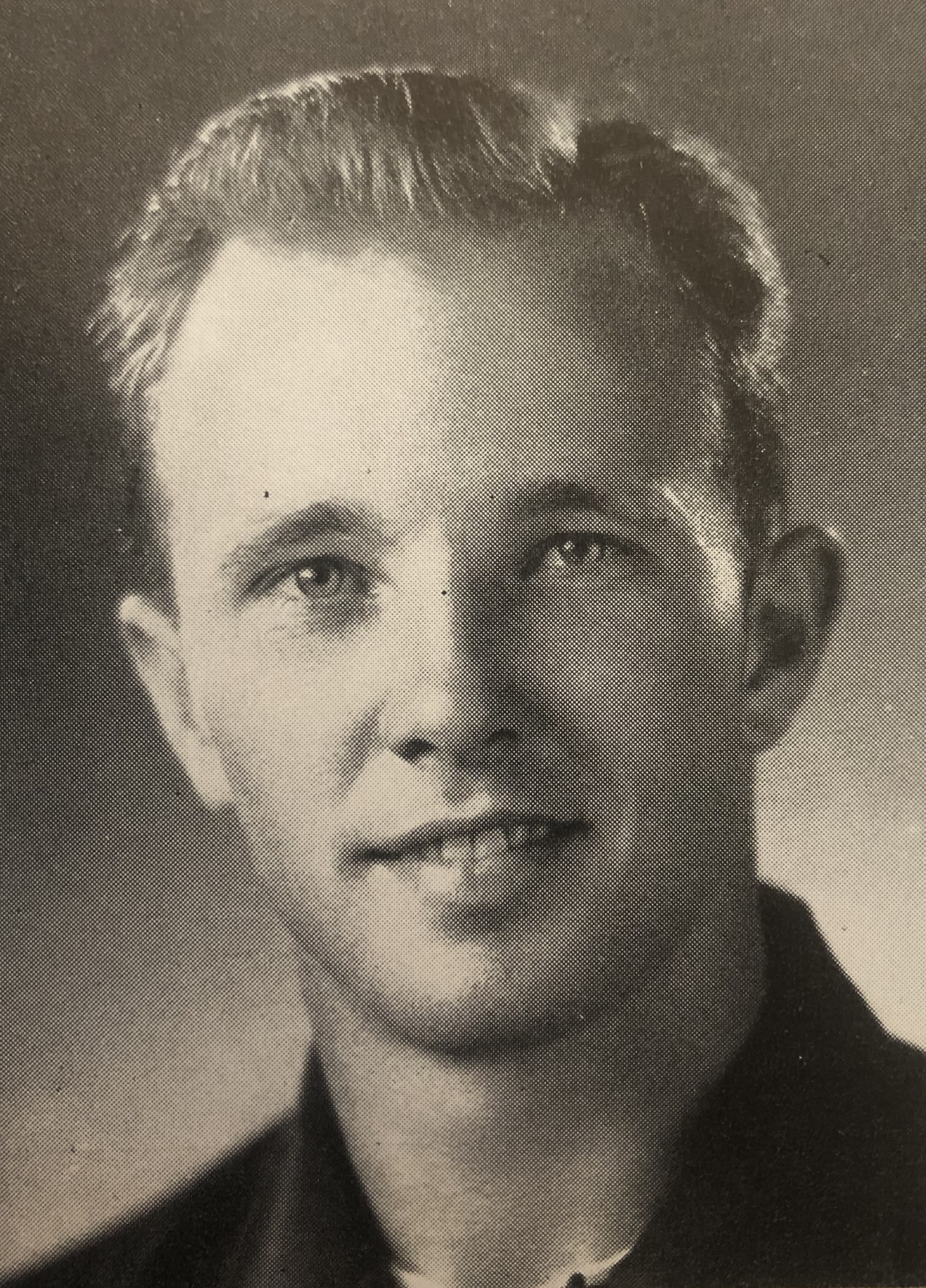
- Powers at USC, c. 1949

No. 62, 15
- Positions: Quarterback, defensive back, linebacker

Personal information
- Born: February 29, 1928; Los Angeles, California, U.S.
- Died: July 27, 2013 (aged 85); California, U.S.
- Listed height: 6 ft 0 in (1.83 m)
- Listed weight: 185 lb (84 kg)

Career information
- High school: Beverly Hills (Beverly Hills, California)
- College: USC
- NFL draft: 1950: 26th round, 335th overall pick

Career history

Playing
- San Francisco 49ers (1950–1953)

Coaching
- Santa Monica (1956–1971) Head coach

Career NFL statistics
- Passing attempts: 70
- Passing completions: 31
- Completion percentage: 44.3%
- TD–INT: 1–4
- Passing yards: 367
- Passer rating: 41.8
- Stats at Pro Football Reference

James W. Powers (February 29, 1928 – July 27, 2013) was an American professional football player and coach. He played professionally as a quarterback, defensive back and linebacker in the National Football League (NFL) with the San Francisco 49ers from 1950 to 1953. He played college football for at the University of Southern California (USC). Powers served as the head football coach at Santa Monica City College—now known as Santa Monica College—in Santa Monica, California from 1956 to 1971. His 1958 Santa Monica Corsairs football team compiled a 10–0 record and defeated Northeastern Oklahoma A&M in the Junior Rose Bowl.

== Head coaching record ==
Year	Team	Overall	Conference	Standing	Bowl/playoffs
Santa Monica Corsairs (Metropolitan Conference) (1956–present)
1956	Santa Monica	6–2–1	4–2–1	T–2nd	
1957	Santa Monica	4–5	3–4	5th	
1958	Santa Monica	10–0	7–0	1st	W Junior Rose Bowl
1959	Santa Monica	7–2	5–2	2nd	
1960	Santa Monica	7–2	5–2	3rd	
1961	Santa Monica	8–1	6–1	2nd	
1962	Santa Monica	5–4	4–3	T–4th	
1963	Santa Monica	4–5	3–4	T–5th	
1964	Santa Monica	4–5	2–4	T–5th	
1965	Santa Monica	3–5–1	1–4–1	6th	
1966	Santa Monica	8–0–1	7–0	1st	
1967	Santa Monica	5–3–1	3–3–1	T–3rd	
1968	Santa Monica	6–3	4–3	4th	
1969	Santa Monica	5–4	2–4	T–5th	
1970	Santa Monica	6–3	4–2	T–2nd	
1971	Santa Monica	3–6	2–4	T–5th	
Santa Monica:		91–50–4	62–42–3		
Total:		91–50–4			
National championship Conference title Conference division title or championship game berth
