= Larry Kentera =

American football player and coach

Biographical details
- Born: April 17, 1924 (age 102)

Playing career
- 1947–1949: Arizona State
- Positions: Center, linebacker

Coaching career (HC unless noted)
- 1951–1958: Palo Verde
- 1959–1965: Stockton / San Joaquin Delta
- 1966–1970: Arizona State (assistant)
- 1971–1978: Arizona State (DC)
- 1984: Northern Arizona (assistant)
- 1985–1989: Northern Arizona
- 1991: Winnipeg Blue Bombers (LB)
- 1992: Arkansas Miners (assistant)
- 1994: Kiel Baltic Hurricanes
- 1996: Kiel Baltic Hurricanes

Head coaching record
- Overall: 26–29 (college); 73–58–4 (junior college)
- Bowls: 0–2 (junior college)

Accomplishments and honors

Championships
- 3 SoCentral (1951–1952, 1955); 1 Big Eight (CA) (1959)

Lawrence "Lazo" Kentera (born April 17, 1924) is an American former football coach and player. He served as the head football coach at Northern Arizona University from 1985 to 1989, compiling a record of 26–29. He spent many years as a defensive assistant at his alma mater, Arizona State University, under head coach Frank Kush. Kentera was also the head football coach at two junior colleges, Palo Verde College in Blythe, California from 1951 to 1958 and San Joaquin Delta College—known as Stockton College until 1963—in Stockton, California from 1959 to 1965.

Kentera was the linebackers coach for the Winnipeg Blue Bombers in the Canadian Football League (CFL) in 1991, working under head coach Darryl Rogers. In 1992, he followed Rogers to serve as an assistant coach for the Arkansas Miners of the short-lived Professional Spring Football League (PSFL). In 1994 and 1996, Kentera was the head coach of the Kiel Baltic Hurricanes in the German Football League, and from 2005 he was working in football in Serbia, the country in which he was born.

Assistant coaches on Kentera's staffs at Northern Arizona included four future National Football League (NFL) head coaches: Bill Callahan, Brad Childress, Marty Mornhinweg, and Andy Reid.

== Head coaching record ==
=== College ===
Year	Team	Overall	Conference	Standing	Bowl/playoffs
Northern Arizona Lumberjacks (Big Sky Conference) (1985–1989)
1985	Northern Arizona	3–8	1–6	T–7th	
1986	Northern Arizona	7–4	5–2	T–2nd	
1987	Northern Arizona	7–4	4–4	T–4th	
1988	Northern Arizona	6–5	4–4	T–4th	
1989	Northern Arizona	3–8	2–6	T–6th	
Northern Arizona:		26–29	16–22		
Total:		26–29			

=== Junior college ===
Year	Team	Overall	Conference	Standing	Bowl/playoffs
Palo Verde Pirates (South Central Conference) (1951–1958)
1951	Palo Verde	4–2–1	3–0	1st	
1952	Palo Verde	8–2	4–0	1st	L Desert Bowl
1953	Palo Verde	4–4–1	3–1–1	3rd	
1954	Palo Verde	4–6	2–3	T–4th	
1955	Palo Verde	7–3	4–1	T–1st	
1956	Palo Verde	3–6	1–5	T–5th	
1957	Palo Verde	5–4	4–1	2nd	
1958	Palo Verde	6–2	3–2	3rd	
Palo Verde:		41–29–2	24–13–1		
Stockton Mustangs (Big Eight Conference) (1959–1961)
1959	Stockton	8–2	6–1	1st	L Sequoia Bowl
1960	Stockton	5–3–1	5–1–1	2nd	
1961	Stockton	2–7	2–5	T–5th	
Stockton / San Joaquin Delta Mustangs (Valley Conference) (1962–1965)
1962	Stockton	6–3	3–2	T–2nd	
1963	San Joaquin Delta	1–7–1	1–4	6th	
1964	San Joaquin Delta	5–4	1–4	5th	
1965	San Joaquin Delta	6–3	3–2	T–2nd	
Stockton / San Joaquin Delta:		32–29–2	21–19–1		
Total:		73–58–4			
National championship Conference title Conference division title or championship game berth
