= Pacific Southwest Conference =

Junior college athletic conference in Southern California

The Pacific Southwest Conference was a junior college athletic conference with member schools located in Southern California that operated from 1964 to 1969. The conference was formed in 1963 with five initial members: Grossmont College, Palomar College, Southwestern College in Chula Vista, San Diego City College, and the newly founded San Diego Mesa College. The five schools officially joined the conference in 1964 for the fall season. Grossmont and Southwestern had been members of the Eastern Conference. Palomar was a member of the South Central Conference. Three more schools—the College of the Desert (COD), Imperial Valley College, and MiraCosta College—were admitted to the conference in 1965. COD left the conference in 1966 and joined the Central Conference. Imperial Valley and MiraCoast left in 1967 for the Desert Conference.

== Yearly football standings ==
1964 Pacific Southwest Conference football standings
	Conf.					Overall
Team	W		L		T	W		L		T
San Diego Junior College $	4	–	0	–	0	9	–	1	–	0
Southwestern (CA)	3	–	1	–	0	6	–	3	–	0
San Diego Mesa	2	–	2	–	0	3	–	5	–	1
Palomar	1	–	3	–	0	3	–	6	–	0
Grossmont	0	–	4	–	0	1	–	8	–	0
$ – Conference champion

1965 Pacific Southwest Conference football standings
	Conf.					Overall
Team	W		L		T	W		L		T
San Diego Junior College $	7	–	0	–	0	7	–	2	–	0
San Diego Mesa	5	–	2	–	0	7	–	2	–	0
Grossmont	4	–	3	–	0	4	–	5	–	0
MiraCosta	4	–	3	–	0	4	–	5	–	0
Palomar	3	–	4	–	0	5	–	4	–	0
Imperial Valley	2	–	5	–	0	3	–	6	–	0
Southwestern (CA)	2	–	5	–	0	4	–	5	–	0
Desert	1	–	6	–	0	2	–	7	–	0
$ – Conference champion

1966 Pacific Southwest Conference football standings
	Conf.					Overall
Team	W		L		T	W		L		T
San Diego Mesa +	5	–	1	–	0	9	–	1	–	0
Southwestern (CA) +	5	–	1	–	0	5	–	3	–	0
San Diego Junior College	4	–	2	–	0	5	–	4	–	0
Grossmont	3	–	3	–	0	3	–	6	–	0
Palomar	2	–	4	–	0	2	–	7	–	0
MiraCosta	1	–	5	–	0	3	–	6	–	0
Imperial Valley	1	–	5	–	0	2	–	7	–	0
+ – Conference co-champions

1967 Pacific Southwest Conference football standings
	Conf.					Overall
Team	W		L		T	W		L		T
San Diego Mesa +	3	–	0	–	1	7	–	1	–	1
San Diego City +^	3	–	0	–	1	7	–	3	–	1
Palomar	2	–	2	–	0	3	–	4	–	2
Southwestern (CA)	1	–	3	–	0	1	–	8	–	0
Grossmont	0	–	4	–	0	2	–	7	–	0
+ – Conference co-champions; ^ – California state junior college large division playoff participant
