= Hank Norton =

American football coach (1927–2019)

Biographical details
- Born: October 15, 1927; Huntington, West Virginia, U.S.
- Died: January 16, 2019 (aged 91)
- Education: Lynchburg College (1951)

Coaching career (HC unless noted)
- 1954–1959: Powhatan HS (VA)
- 1960–1993: Ferrum

Head coaching record
- Overall: 63–31–1 (college); 181–45–9 (junior college); 40–16–3 (high school)
- Tournaments: 2–4 (NCAA D-III playoffs); 4–1 (NJCAA playoffs)

Accomplishments and honors

Championships
- 4 NJACC (1965, 1968, 1974, 1977); 6 CFC (1971–1972, 1974, 1979–1981)

W. H. "Hank" Norton (October 15, 1927 – January 16, 2019) was American football coach. He served as the head coach at Ferrum College in Ferrum, Virginia from 1960 to 1993. Norton coached Ferrum to four NJCAA National Football Championships and then guided the program to four-year NCAA varsity status in 1985.

== Head coaching record ==
=== College ===
Year	Team	Overall	Conference	Standing	Bowl/playoffs
Ferrum Panthers (NCAA Division III independent) (1985–1993)
1985	Ferrum	6–5			
1986	Ferrum	3–8			
1987	Ferrum	8–2–1			L NCAA Division III First Round
1988	Ferrum	11–1			L NCAA Division III Semifinal
1989	Ferrum	11–2			L NCAA Division III Semifinal
1990	Ferrum	8–2			L NCAA Division III First Round
1991	Ferrum	7–2			
1992	Ferrum	4–5			
1993	Ferrum	5–4			
Ferrum:		63–31–1			
Total:		63–31–1			

=== Junior college ===
Year	Team	Overall	Conference	Standing	Bowl/playoffs
Ferrum Panthers (NJCAA independent) (1960–1969)
1960	Ferrum	5–0–2			
1961	Ferrum	6–1–2			
1962	Ferrum	3–3–1			
1963	Ferrum	3–5			
1964	Ferrum	5–4			
1965	Ferrum	10–0			W Savannah Shrine Bowl
1966	Ferrum	8–1–1			L Savannah Shrine Bowl
1967	Ferrum	7–1			
1968	Ferrum	10–0			W NJCAA Championship Game
1969	Ferrum	6–2			
Ferrum Panthers (Coastal Football Conference) (1970–1984?)
1970	Ferrum	6–2–1			
1971	Ferrum	8–0–1	5–0–1	1st	
1972	Ferrum	8–2	3–1	1st	
1973	Ferrum	9–1			
1974	Ferrum	10–0	6–0	1st	W NJCAA Championship Game
1975	Ferrum	5–4			
1976	Ferrum	6–4			
1977	Ferrum	9–1			W NJCAA Championship Game
1978	Ferrum	8–2			
1979	Ferrum	10–1	7–0	1st	
1980	Ferrum	9–1–1	5–1	T–1st	
1981	Ferrum	8–2	6–2	T–1st	
1982	Ferrum	9–1			
1983	Ferrum	6–4			
1984	Ferrum	7–3			
Ferrum:		181–45–9			
Total:		181–45–9			
National championship Conference title Conference division title or championship game berth
