= Desert Conference =

Junior college athletic conference in Southern California

The Desert Conference was a junior college athletic conference with member schools located in Southern California that operated from 1961 to 1981. It was formed in 1961 with four charter members: Barstow Community College, Imperial Valley College, Palo Verde College, and Victor Valley College. The College of the Desert joined the conference in 1962.

The Desert Conference was abolished by California's Commission on Athletics (COA) in 1981. In a releaguing process, the members of the conference moved to the newly-formed Foothill Conference.

== Yearly football standings ==
1967 Desert Conference football standings
	Conf.					Overall
Team	W		L		T	W		L		T
MiraCosta $^	6	–	0	–	0	8	–	2	–	0
Imperial Valley	5	–	1	–	0	6	–	3	–	0
Mt. San Jacinto	3	–	3	–	0	5	–	4	–	0
Barstow	3	–	3	–	0	3	–	6	–	0
Desert	3	–	3	–	0	3	–	5	–	0
Palo Verde	1	–	5	–	0	3	–	6	–	0
Victor Valley	0	–	6	–	0	0	–	8	–	0
$ – Conference champion; ^ – California state junior college small division playoff participant

1968 Desert Conference football standings
	Conf.					Overall
Team	W		L		T	W		L		T
MiraCosta $^	7	–	0	–	0	8	–	2	–	0
Antelope Valley	6	–	1	–	0	7	–	2	–	0
Mt. San Jacinto	5	–	2	–	0	7	–	2	–	0
Barstow	4	–	3	–	0	5	–	4	–	0
Imperial Valley	3	–	4	–	0	4	–	5	–	0
Desert	2	–	5	–	0	3	–	6	–	0
Palo Verde	1	–	6	–	0	2	–	7	–	0
Victor Valley	0	–	7	–	0	0	–	9	–	0
$ – Conference champion; ^ – California state junior college small division playoff participant

1969 Desert Conference football standings
	Conf.					Overall
Team	W		L		T	W		L		T
Saddleback $^	6	–	0	–	0	9	–	2	–	0
MiraCosta	5	–	1	–	0	6	–	3	–	0
Mt. San Jacinto	4	–	2	–	0	6	–	3	–	0
Imperial Valley	3	–	3	–	0	5	–	4	–	0
Barstow	2	–	4	–	0	2	–	6	–	1
Desert	1	–	5	–	0	2	–	7	–	0
Victor Valley	0	–	6	–	0	1	–	8	–	0
$ – Conference champion; ^ – California state junior college small division playoff participant

1970 Desert Conference football standings
	Conf.					Overall
Team	W		L		T	W		L		T
Victor Valley $^	6	–	1	–	0	7	–	2	–	0
College of the Canyons	5	–	2	–	0	7	–	2	–	0
Mt. San Jacinto	4	–	3	–	0	5	–	4	–	0
MiraCosta	4	–	3	–	0	4	–	5	–	0
Palo Verde	3	–	4	–	0	5	–	4	–	0
Desert	3	–	4	–	0	4	–	5	–	0
Imperial Valley	2	–	5	–	0	2	–	7	–	0
Barstow	1	–	6	–	0	1	–	8	–	0
$ – Conference champion; ^ – California state junior college small division playoff participant Desert forfeited conference wins over Victor Valley, Mt. San Jacinto, Palo Verde, and Barstow.

1971 Desert Conference football standings
	Conf.					Overall
Team	W		L		T	W		L		T
College of the Canyons $^	7	–	0	–	0	8	–	2	–	0
Victor Valley	6	–	1	–	0	7	–	2	–	0
Desert	4	–	3	–	0	6	–	4	–	0
Palo Verde	4	–	3	–	0	5	–	5	–	0
Imperial Valley	3	–	4	–	0	3	–	7	–	0
MiraCosta	3	–	4	–	0	3	–	7	–	0
Mt. San Jacinto	1	–	6	–	0	1	–	6	–	0
Barstow	0	–	7	–	0	0	–	10	–	0
$ – Conference champion; ^ – California state junior college small division playoff participant

1972 Desert Conference football standings
	Conf.					Overall
Team	W		L		T	W		L		T
MiraCosta $^	4	–	1	–	1	5	–	4	–	1
Desert	3	–	1	–	2	?	–	?	–	?
Victor Valley	4	–	2	–	0	?	–	?	–	?
Imperial Valley	4	–	2	–	0	?	–	?	–	?
Barstow	3	–	2	–	1	?	–	?	–	?
Palo Verde	1	–	5	–	0	?	–	?	–	?
Mt. San Jacinto	0	–	6	–	0	?	–	?	–	?
$ – Conference champion; ^ – California state junior college small division playoff participant

1973 Desert Conference football standings
	Conf.					Overall
Team	W		L		T	W		L		T
MiraCosta $^	6	–	0	–	0	10	–	2	–	0
Desert	5	–	1	–	0	5	–	5	–	0
Imperial Valley	4	–	2	–	0	4	–	5	–	0
Barstow	3	–	3	–	0	5	–	5	–	0
Mt. San Jacinto	2	–	4	–	0	3	–	6	–	0
Victor Valley	1	–	5	–	0	1	–	7	–	0
Palo Verde	0	–	6	–	0	1	–	7	–	0
$ – Conference champion; ^ – California state junior college small division playoff participant

1974 Desert Conference football standings
	Conf.					Overall
Team	W		L		T	W		L		T
MiraCosta $^	5	–	0	–	0	7	–	2	–	0
Imperial Valley	3	–	2	–	0	6	–	2	–	0
Mt. San Jacinto	3	–	2	–	0	5	–	3	–	0
Desert	2	–	3	–	0	4	–	6	–	0
Victor Valley	1	–	4	–	0	1	–	6	–	0
Barstow	1	–	4	–	0	1	–	6	–	0
$ – Conference champion; ^ – California state junior college Division III playoff participant

1975 Desert Conference football standings
	Conf.					Overall
Team	W		L		T	W		L		T
Imperial Valley +	5	–	1	–	0	7	–	3	–	0
Mt. San Jacinto +	5	–	1	–	0	7	–	3	–	0
MiraCosta +^	5	–	1	–	0	7	–	3	–	1
Barstow	3	–	3	–	0	4	–	5	–	0
Desert	2	–	4	–	0	2	–	8	–	0
Victor Valley	1	–	5	–	0	2	–	6	–	0
Palo Verde	0	–	6	–	0	0	–	7	–	0
+ – Conference co-champions; ^ – California state junior college small division playoff participant

1976 Desert Conference football standings
	Conf.					Overall
Team	W		L		T	W		L		T
MiraCosta $	5	–	0	–	0	7	–	3	–	0
Mt. San Jacinto	3	–	2	–	0	5	–	3	–	1
Desert	3	–	2	–	0	6	–	4	–	0
Victor Valley	2	–	3	–	0	3	–	5	–	0
Imperial Valley	2	–	3	–	0	4	–	4	–	0
Barstow	0	–	5	–	0	0	–	8	–	0
$ – Conference champion

1977 Desert Conference football standings
	Conf.					Overall
Team	W		L		T	W		L		T
Desert $^	4	–	0	–	0	6	–	4	–	0
Mt. San Jacinto	3	–	1	–	0	6	–	3	–	0
MiraCosta	2	–	2	–	0	2	–	7	–	0
Imperial Valley	1	–	3	–	0	1	–	8	–	0
Victor Valley	0	–	4	–	0	3	–	6	–	1
$ – Conference champion; ^ – California state junior college Division II playoff participant Scottsdale forfeited a non-conference game to Desert.

1978 Desert Conference football standings
	Conf.					Overall
Team	W		L		T	W		L		T
Mt. San Jacinto $^	4	–	0	–	0	5	–	6	–	0
Desert	3	–	1	–	0	5	–	3	–	0
MiraCosta	2	–	2	–	0	3	–	6	–	0
Imperial Valley	1	–	3	–	0	1	–	7	–	1
Victor Valley	0	–	4	–	0	3	–	7	–	0
$ – Conference champion; ^ – California state junior college Division II playoff participant

1979 Desert Conference football standings
	Conf.					Overall
Team	W		L		T	W		L		T
Desert $^	4	–	0	–	0	6	–	4	–	0
Imperial Valley	3	–	1	–	0	5	–	5	–	0
Mt. San Jacinto	2	–	2	–	0	4	–	5	–	0
MiraCosta	1	–	3	–	0	3	–	6	–	0
Victor Valley	0	–	4	–	0	4	–	5	–	0
$ – Conference champion; ^ – California state junior college Division II playoff participant

1980 Desert Conference football standings
	Conf.					Overall
Team	W		L		T	W		L		T
Mt. San Jacinto $^	6	–	0	–	0	9	–	3	–	0
Desert	3	–	3	–	0	5	–	5	–	0
Imperial Valley	1	–	5	–	0	?	–	?	–	?
MiraCosta	2	–	4	–	0	?	–	?	–	?
$ – Conference champion; ^ – California state junior college Division II playoff participant
