= Claude Gilbert =

American football coach (1932–2024)

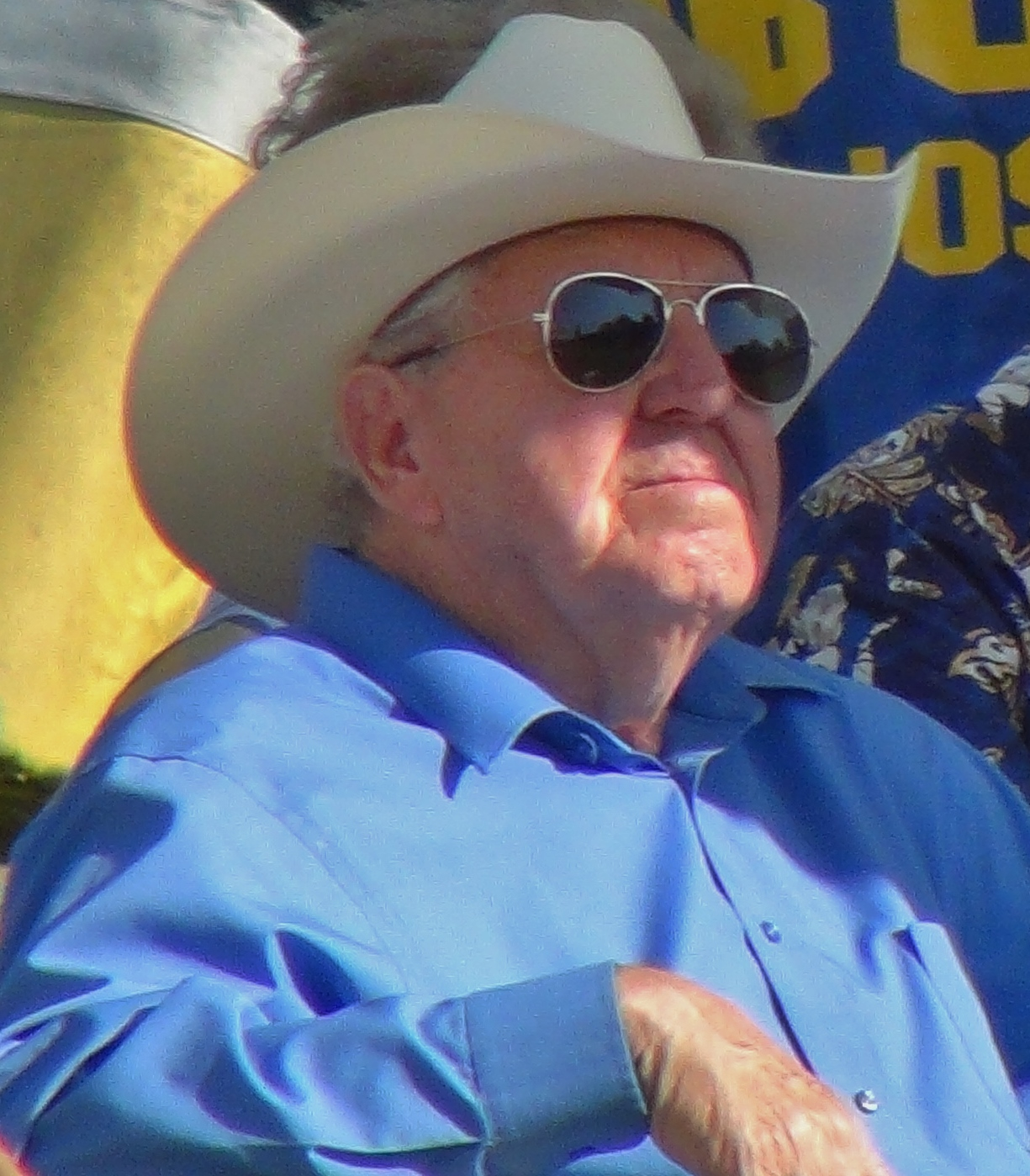
- Gilbert in 2017

Biographical details
- Born: July 10, 1932; Oklahoma, U.S.
- Died: January 6, 2024 (aged 91); Grass Valley, California, U.S.

Playing career
- 1950, 1955: Bakersfield
- 1957–1958: San Jose State

Coaching career (HC unless noted)
- 1959: Tulare HS (CA) (assistant)
- 1960–1962: Shafter HS (CA)
- 1963–1965: Bakersfield (assistant)
- 1966: Southwestern (CA)
- 1967–1968: San Diego State (OL)
- 1969–1972: San Diego State (DC)
- 1973–1980: San Diego State
- 1981–1983: San Jose State (DC)
- 1984–1989: San Jose State
- 1991–1992: Frankfurt Galaxy (DC)
- 1994: Highland HS (NM)
- 1995–1999: San Diego State (DC)

Head coaching record
- Overall: 99–56–3 (college); 5–3 (junior college)
- Bowls: 1–1

Accomplishments and honors

Championships
- 4 PCAA / Big West (1973–1974, 1986–1987); 1 PSC (1966)

Claude L. Gilbert (July 10, 1932 – January 6, 2024) was an American college football coach. He served as head football coach at San Diego State University from 1973 to 1980, and San Jose State University from 1984 to 1989, compiling a career record of 99–56–3.

== Early life and education ==
Born in Oklahoma on July 10, 1932, Gilbert graduated from Bakersfield High School in Bakersfield, California in 1950. He went to Bakersfield College for a year and played on the football team before serving in the United States Air Force for the Korean War. He returned to Bakersfield College, then transferred to San Jose State University in 1956 and lettered in football for two years with the San Jose State Spartans.

== Coaching career ==
Gilbert was an assistant football, wrestling, and track coach at Tulare High School in Tulare, California from 1959 to 1960.

After serving as assistant to San Diego State coach Don Coryell for six seasons, Gilbert succeeded him as head coach in 1973. He compiled a 61–26–2 record and won three conference titles, ranking second in Aztec victories and winning percentage only to Coryell. They finished 10–1 in both 1976 and 1977. 1977 also saw the Aztecs crush Bobby Bowden's Florida State team 41–16, and finish ranked 16th in the nation. During a transition from relying on junior college transfers to recruiting high school students, the Aztecs went 4–8 in 1980 and fired Gilbert in a controversial move.

Gilbert later became head coach at his alma mater, San Jose State, from 1984 to 1989. He compiled a 38–30–1 record, including a pair of consecutive 10–2 seasons in 1986 and 1987. Gilbert was fired from San Jose State following the 1989 season after signing 21 junior college transfers, against orders from administration to limit scholarships offered to such student-athletes. Gilbert sued San Jose State for wrongful termination in 1990, but a state appeals court dismissed the lawsuit in 1992.

Gilbert returned to San Diego State as defensive coordinator under Ted Tollner in 1995, and oversaw consecutive eight-win seasons, which was not achieved until 2010 and 2011.

Gilbert was inducted into the Aztec Hall of Fame in 2004, and into the Spartan Stadium Ring of Honor in 2006.

Gilbert died at home in Grass Valley, California, on January 6, 2024, at the age of 91. He had recently been diagnosed with lung cancer.

== Head coaching record ==
=== College ===
Year	Team	Overall	Conference	Standing	Bowl/playoffs	Coaches^{#}	AP^{°}
San Diego State Aztecs (Pacific Coast Athletic Association) (1973–1975)
1973	San Diego State	9–1–1	3–0–1	1st		19	
1974	San Diego State	8–2–1	4–0	1st			
1975	San Diego State	8–3	3–2	3rd			
San Diego State Aztecs (NCAA Division I independent) (1976–1977)
1976	San Diego State	10–1					
1977	San Diego State	10–1				19	16
San Diego State Aztecs (Western Athletic Conference) (1978–1980)
1978	San Diego State	4–7	2–4	T–5th			
1979	San Diego State	8–3	4–2	3rd			
1980	San Diego State	4–8	4–4	T–4th			
San Diego State:		61–26–2	20–12–1				
San Jose State Spartans (Pacific Coast Athletic Association / Big West Conference) (1984–1989)
1984	San Jose State	6–5	5–2	3rd			
1985	San Jose State	2–8–1	2–4–1	6th			
1986	San Jose State	10–2	7–0	1st	W California		
1987	San Jose State	10–2	7–0	1st	L California		
1988	San Jose State	4–8	4–3	T–3rd			
1989	San Jose State	6–5	5–2	T–2nd			
San Jose State:		38–30–1	30–11–1				
Total:		99–56–3					
National championship Conference title Conference division title or championship game berth
^{#}Rankings from final Coaches Poll.; ^{°}Rankings from final AP Poll.

=== Junior college ===
Year	Team	Overall	Conference	Standing	Bowl/playoffs
Southwestern Apaches (Pacific Southwest Conference) (1966)
1966	Southwestern	5–3	5–1	T–1st	
Southwestern:		5–3	5–1		
Total:		5–3			
National championship Conference title Conference division title or championship game berth
