= Dick Foster =

American football coach

Biographical details
- Born: January 24, 1934; Nevada, Missouri, U.S.
- Died: October 23, 2020 (aged 86)

Playing career
- c. 1953: William Jewell

Coaching career (HC unless noted)
- 1955–1956: Grain Valley HS (MO) (assistant)
- 1957–1968: Platte County HS (MO)
- 1969–1970: Fort Scott
- 1971–1974: Kansas (freshmen / recruiting)
- 1975–1988: Coffeyville

Head coaching record
- Overall: 146–25–2 (junior college); 84–22–9 (high school)
- Bowls: 9–3 (junior college)

Accomplishments and honors

Championships
- 2 NJCAA National (1970, 1983); 10 KJJCC/KJCCC regular season (1970, 1975–1976, 1978–1980, 1982, 1984, 1986, 1988)

Richard Henry Foster (January 24, 1934 – October 23, 2020) was an American football coach. He served as the head football coach at Fort Scott Community College in Fort Scott, Kansas from 1969 to 1970 and Coffeyville Community College from 1975 to 1988, compiling a career junior college football coaching record of 146–25–2. He led his 1970 Fort Scott Greyhounds football team and 1983 Coffeyville Red Ravens football team to NJCAA National Football Championships.

Foster graduated from William Jewell College in 1954, and later received a master's degree from the University of Missouri. He began his coaching career at Grain Valley High School in Grain Valley, Missouri, where he was an assistant football coach for two seasons. Foster was the head football coach at Platte County High School in Platte City, Missouri from 1957 to 1968, tallying a mark of 84–22–9 in 12 seasons. In between his stints at Fort Scott and Coffeyville, he spent four years at the University of Kansas as freshman coach and director of recruiting under head football coach Don Fambrough. Foster left Coffeyville in 1989 to become the athletic department recruiting coordinator at the University of Oklahoma, reporting to athletic director Donnie Duncan. Foster's on, Skip Foster, succeeded him as head coach of the Red Ravens.

Foster died on October 23, 2020.

== Head coaching record ==
=== Junior college ===
Year	Team	Overall	Conference	Standing	Bowl/playoffs
Fort Scott Greyhounds (Kansas Jayhawk Junior College Conference) (1969–1970)
1969	Fort Scott	8–2	5–2	T–2nd	
1970	Fort Scott	11–0	8–0	1st	W Shrine Bowl
Fort Scott:		19–2	13–2		
Coffeyville Red Ravens (Kansas Jayhawk Community College Conference) (1975–1988)
1975	Coffeyville	11–0	8–0	1st	W Wool Bowl
1976	Coffeyville	8–3	7–1	1st	L Wool Bowl
1977	Coffeyville	7–3	5–3	3rd	
1978	Coffeyville	10–1	8–0	1st	W Coca-Cola Bowl
1979	Coffeyville	7–3	6–2	T–1st	L Rodeo Bowl
1980	Coffeyville	9–0	7–0	1st	W Beef Empire Classic
1981	Coffeyville	8–1–1	6–1–1	2nd	
1982	Coffeyville	10–1	8–0	1st	
1983	Coffeyville	11–1	7–1	2nd	W Kansas Jayhawk Bowl
1984	Coffeyville	10–2	7–0	1st	W Kansas Jayhawk Bowl
1985	Coffeyville	10–2	6–1	2nd	W Kansas Jayhawk Bowl
1986	Coffeyville	9–2	7–0	1st	L Kansas Jayhawk Bowl
1987	Coffeyville	8–2	5–1	2nd	W Kansas Jayhawk Bowl
1988	Coffeyville	9–1–1	6–0	1st	W Kansas Jayhawk Bowl
Coffeyville:		127–23–2	85–10–1		
Total:		146–25–2			
National championship Conference title Conference division title or championship game berth
