= 1966 Southwestern Apaches football team =

American college football season

1966 Southwestern Apaches football

PSC co-champion
- Conference: Pacific Southwest Conference
- Record: 5–3 (5–1 PSC)
- Head coach: Claude Gilbert (1st season)
- Offensive scheme: T formation (Note: The team was alternatively reported as employing Pro T and Wing T variations.)
- MVP: Jim Melillo
- Home stadium: Chula Vista High School

1966 Pacific Southwest Conference football standings
	Conf.					Overall
Team	W		L		T	W		L		T
San Diego Mesa +	5	–	1	–	0	9	–	1	–	0
Southwestern (CA) +	5	–	1	–	0	5	–	3	–	0
San Diego Junior College	4	–	2	–	0	5	–	4	–	0
Grossmont	3	–	3	–	0	3	–	6	–	0
Palomar	2	–	4	–	0	2	–	7	–	0
MiraCosta	1	–	5	–	0	3	–	6	–	0
Imperial Valley	1	–	5	–	0	2	–	7	–	0
+ – Conference co-champions

The 1966 Southwestern Apaches football team was an American football team that represented Southwestern College as a member of the Pacific Southwest Conference (PSC) during the 1966 junior college football season. In their first season under head coach Claude Gilbert, the Apaches compiled a 5–3 record (5–1 in conference games) and shared the PSC championship with San Diego Mesa. It was the first conference title in program history.

The 1966 Apaches lost both of their non-conference games to open the season. In PSC play, the Apaches won their first five games before losing to San Diego Mesa in the season finale. The Apaches were contacted by the Elks Bowl committee, but declined a berth in any post-season bowl game. The Elks Bowl berth was instead awarded to San Diego Mesa.

Two Southwestern players earned honorable mentions on the 1966 junior college All-American football team by the Los Angeles Times and J.C. Grid-Wire: tackle Jim Melillo and back Dave Barajas. In addition, six Southwestern players were selected as first-team players on the 1966 All-PSC football team: Barajas, Melillo, guard Mike Woolrich, defensive end Howard Taylor, defensive tackle Bill Chavez and defensive back Marty Jensen. The team was led on offense by Barajas, who rushed for 839 yards and ten touchdowns on 177 carries (4.7 yards per carry), and quarterback Bill Miller.

The team played its home games at Chula Vista High School in Chula Vista, California.

== Schedule ==
The September 24 game between Southwestern and Pasadena City was the first meeting between the two schools in any sport. The Apaches' October 29 victory against San Diego City (SDCC), the two-time defending Pacific Southwest Conference (PSC) champions, marked SDCC's first-ever loss in PSC play.

Date	Time	Opponent	Site	Result	Attendance	Source
September 17		at Riverside*	Riverside, CA	L 21–34		
September 24	8:00 p.m.	Pasadena City*	Chula Vista High School; Chula Vista, CA	L 12–34		
October 8		at Imperial Valley	Imperial, CA	W 36–6		
October 15	8:00 p.m.	Grossmont	Chula Vista High School; Chula Vista, CA	W 38–7		
October 22	8:00 p.m.	MiraCosta	Chula Vista High School; Chula Vista, CA	W 27–6		
October 29	8:00 p.m.	at San Diego City	Balboa Stadium; San Diego, CA	W 9–7		
November 5	8:00 p.m.	Palomar^{†}	Chula Vista High School; Chula Vista, CA	W 26–6	2,102	
November 12	8:00 p.m.	at San Diego Mesa	San Diego, CA	L 6–13		
*Non-conference game; ^{†}Homecoming; All times are in Pacific time

== Offseason ==
On December 15, 1965, head coach Tom Parker announced his resignation from the post at the fifth annual football awards dinner after compiling an 18–26–1 record in five seasons at the helm, citing health issues. The decision was accepted by school president Chet Devore "with reluctance" and Parker remained in his role as athletic director. In March 1966, Claude Gilbert, a defensive assistant coach at Bakersfield College, was hired as his successor, and added assistant Wes Foreman to join Bill Duncan and Art Filson on the coaching staff.

The Apaches returned eight letterwinners from the previous season. The coaching staff recruited two members of the 1965 all-CIF San Diego Section football team – quarterback Bill Miller of Castle Park High School and back Ward Lannom of Hilltop High School – among the 55 freshmen signed from area high schools.

=== Transfers ===
==== Outgoing ====
Outgoing transfers
Name	Pos.	Year	Height	Weight	College transferred to	Source(s)
John Beck	DB	Sophomore			San Diego State	
Buddy Lane	DE	Sophomore		220	Northern Arizona	
Charlie Sanford	HB	Sophomore	5'9"	180	Kansas State	
Joe Stetser	QB	Junior		190	Chico State	
Jim Stuckey	DT	Sophomore	6'4"	240	Utah	

Stetser played with Southwestern in 1963 and 1964 before joining Chico State in 1966.

== Awards and honors ==
All-American
Player	Position	Team
Jim Melillo	T	Honorable mention
Dave Barajas	B	Honorable mention

All-Pacific Southwest Conference
Player	Position	Team
Jim Melillo	T	First Team
Mike Woolrich	G	First Team
Dave Barajas	B	First Team
Howard Taylor	DE	First Team
Bill Chavez	DT	First Team
Marty Jensen	DB	First Team

Six Southwestern players were selected as first-team honorees on the 1966 All-Pacific Southwest Conference football team. Five additional Apaches players earned honorable mention: Dean Harrold, Gary Estes, Rick Sorenson, Mike Mahoney, and Bill Miller.

=== Team awards ===
After the season, 27 Apaches football players were honored at Southwestern's sixth annual awards banquet in December, while there were five "special awards" given out:

Team Awards
Award	Player
MVP	Jim Melillo
Best Offensive Player	Dave Barajas
Best Defensive Player	Bill Chavez
Most Improved Player	Dean Harrold
Most Inspirational Player	Mike Mahoney
