= Phil Elmassian =

American football player and coach (born 1951)

Biographical details
- Born: April 28, 1951 (age 75); Wellesley, Massachusetts, U.S.

Playing career
- 1971–1974: William & Mary
- Position: Defensive back

Coaching career (HC unless noted)
- 1974–1975: William & Mary (QB/RB)
- 1976–1978: Richmond (QB/RB)
- 1979–1982: Ferrum (DC)
- 1983: East Carolina (DB)
- 1984: Minnesota (DB)
- 1985–1986: Virginia Tech (DB)
- 1987–1990: Virginia (DB)
- 1991–1992: Syracuse (DB)
- 1993–1994: Virginia Tech (DC)
- 1995: Washington (assistant)
- 1996: Boston College (DC)
- 1997–1999: Wisconsin (DB)
- 2000: LSU (DC)
- 2001: West Virginia (DC)
- 2002: Marshall (LB)
- 2003: Purdue (DB)
- 2004–2007: Nebraska (DB)
- 2008: Louisiana–Monroe (DC)
- 2009–2010: Illinois State (DC)
- 2011: Purdue (LB)
- 2012–2013: UMass (DC)
- 2014: Ferrum (DC)

Phil Elmassian (/ɛlˈmeɪʃən/ el-MAY-shən; born April 28, 1951) is a retired American football coach. His last job was as the defensive coordinator for Ferrum College.

== Playing career ==
Elmassian was a two-year starter on the Wellesley High School football team. After graduating, he went on the play college football at Ferrum Junior College for Hank Norton transferring after two seasons to William and Mary under coach Lou Holtz where he played defensive back.

== Coaching career ==
Elmassian began his coaching career at his alma mater William and Mary in 1974, serving two seasons as the running backs and quarterbacks coach. He then moved to Richmond where he spent three seasons (1976–1978) as the running backs and quarterbacks coach for the Spiders. From 1979 to 1982 Elmassian earned his first defensive coordinator position at Ferrum College, which was classified as a junior college at that time. From 1983 to 1992 Elmassian spent time at East Carolina, Minnesota, Virginia Tech, Virginia and Syracuse as a secondary coach. In 1993 Elmassian garnered his first defensive coordinator job at a major football college at Virginia Tech. He held the position for 2 seasons before serving as the Boston College defensive coordinator from 1995 to 1996. From 1997 to 1999 Elmassian served as the secondary coach at Wisconsin, during his stint at Wisconsin the Badgers ranked first in the nation in scoring defense in 1998 and fifth in the nation in 1999. Elmassian was the defensive coordinator for LSU in 2000 and West Virginia in 2001. Between the 2002 and 2007 seasons, Elmassian was a position coach at Marshall, Purdue and Nebraska. Elmassian next spent one season in 2008 at Louisiana-Monroe as its defensive coordinator before serving two years (2009–2010) as the defensive coordinator for Illinois State. Elmassian then went back to Purdue for one season in 2011 to serve as linebackers coach for the Boilermakers. In 2012, Elmassian was named defensive coordinator for head coach Charley Molnar's staff at UMass. Elmassian was fired after the 2013 season. He then returned to Ferrum College to serve as defensive coordinator in 2014 where he resigned for health reasons toward the end of the season. He now assists on a sport's radio show in Roanoke.
