= South Central Conference (California) =

Junior college athletic conference in Southern California

The South Central Conference (SoCentral) was a junior college athletic conference with member schools located in Southern California. The conference was formed in 1948 by the Southern Conference Junior College Association. The conference's initial members were Antelope Valley College of Lancaster, Central Junior College of El Centro, Oceanside-Carlsbad Junior College of Oceanside, Palomar College of Vista, and Palo Verde Junior College of Blythe, California.

== Yearly football standings ==
1950 South Central Conference (California) football standings
	Conf.					Overall
Team	W		L		T	W		L		T
Palo Verde +	4	–	1	–	0	9	–	1	–	0
Citrus +	4	–	1	–	0	8	–	1	–	0
Oceanside-Carlsbad	3	–	1	–	1	4	–	3	–	2
Palomar	2	–	3	–	0	2	–	3	–	1
Central (CA)	1	–	3	–	1	2	–	4	–	2
Antelope Valley	0	–	5	–	0	0	–	8	–	0
+ – Conference co-champions

1951 South Central Conference (California) football standings
	Conf.					Overall
Team	W		L		T	W		L		T
Palo Verde $	3	–	0	–	0	4	–	2	–	1
Citrus	2	–	2	–	0	4	–	3	–	1
Oceanside-Carlsbad	2	–	2	–	0	2	–	4	–	0
Palomar	2	–	2	–	0	2	–	5	–	0
Central (CA)	0	–	3	–	0	0	–	3	–	0
$ – Conference champion; The game between Palo Verde and Central was cancelled.

1952 South Central Conference (California) football standings
	Conf.					Overall
Team	W		L		T	W		L		T
Palo Verde $	4	–	0	–	0	8	–	2	–	0
Citrus	3	–	1	–	0	5	–	4	–	0
Imperial Valley	2	–	2	–	0	3	–	6	–	0
Palomar	1	–	3	–	0	2	–	4	–	0
Oceanside-Carlsbad	0	–	4	–	0	0	–	7	–	0
Antelope Valley			–			6	–	3	–	0
$ – Conference champion; Antelope Valley had a record of 2–1 against conference opponents, but those games were not counted in the conference standings because the team did not play a complete league schedule. Oceanside forfeited to Palo Verde.

1953 South Central Conference (California) football standings
	Conf.					Overall
Team	W		L		T	W		L		T
Antelope Valley +	4	–	1	–	0	7	–	2	–	0
Citrus +	4	–	1	–	0	6	–	3	–	0
Palo Verde	3	–	1	–	1	4	–	4	–	1
Oceanside-Carlsbad	2	–	2	–	1	4	–	3	–	1
Palomar	1	–	4	–	0	3	–	5	–	0
Imperial Valley	0	–	5	–	0	2	–	7	–	0
+ – Conference co-champions

1954 South Central Conference (California) football standings
	Conf.					Overall
Team	W		L		T	W		L		T
Antelope Valley $	5	–	0	–	0	10	–	0	–	1
Palomar	3	–	2	–	0	6	–	3	–	0
Oceanside-Carlsbad	3	–	2	–	0	5	–	3	–	0
Citrus	2	–	3	–	0	4	–	6	–	0
Palo Verde	2	–	3	–	0	4	–	6	–	0
Imperial Valley	0	–	5	–	0	2	–	8	–	0
$ – Conference champion

1955 South Central Conference (California) football standings
	Conf.					Overall
Team	W		L		T	W		L		T
Antelope Valley +	4	–	1	–	0	8	–	2	–	0
Palo Verde +	4	–	1	–	0	7	–	3	–	0
Citrus +	4	–	1	–	0	6	–	4	–	0
Imperial Valley	2	–	3	–	0	2	–	5	–	0
Palomar	1	–	4	–	0	3	–	5	–	1
Oceanside-Carlsbad	0	–	5	–	0	1	–	7	–	0
+ – Conference co-champions; Palomar forfeited conference wins over Citrus, Imperial Valley, and Palo Verde. Oceanside forfeited conference games to Palo Verde and Palomar and a non-conference game to Redlands JV.

1956 South Central Conference (California) football standings
	Conf.					Overall
Team	W		L		T	W		L		T
Antelope Valley $	6	–	0	–	0	6	–	4	–	0
Citrus	5	–	1	–	0	6	–	3	–	0
Imperial Valley	4	–	2	–	0	4	–	4	–	0
Oceanside-Carlsbad	3	–	3	–	0	0	–	4	–	4
Palo Verde	1	–	5	–	0	3	–	6	–	0
Palomar	1	–	5	–	0	2	–	7	–	0
Santa Barbara City	1	–	5	–	0	1	–	7	–	0
$ – Conference champion

1957 South Central Conference (California) football standings
	Conf.					Overall
Team	W		L		T	W		L		T
Oceanside-Carlsbad	5	–	0	–	0	0	–	6	–	2
Palo Verde	4	–	1	–	0	5	–	4	–	0
Antelope Valley	3	–	2	–	0	3	–	5	–	0
Palomar	2	–	3	–	0	2	–	5	–	0
Santa Barbara City	1	–	4	–	0	1	–	7	–	0
Imperial Valley	0	–	5	–	0	0	–	7	–	0
$ – Conference champion

1958 South Central Conference (California) football standings
	Conf.					Overall
Team	W		L		T	W		L		T
Antelope Valley $	5	–	0	–	0	6	–	4	–	0
Oceanside-Carlsbad	4	–	1	–	0	8	–	1	–	0
Palo Verde	3	–	2	–	0	6	–	2	–	0
Palomar	2	–	3	–	0	3	–	5	–	1
Santa Barbara City	1	–	4	–	0	1	–	7	–	0
Imperial Valley	0	–	5	–	0	0	–	7	–	0
$ – Conference champion

1959 South Central Conference (California) football standings
	Conf.					Overall
Team	W		L		T	W		L		T
Antelope Valley $	5	–	0	–	0	7	–	2	–	0
Palo Verde	3	–	1	–	1	5	–	2	–	2
Oceanside-Carlsbad	3	–	2	–	0	4	–	5	–	0
Palomar	2	–	3	–	0	4	–	5	–	0
Santa Barbara City	1	–	4	–	0	1	–	6	–	0
Imperial Valley	0	–	4	–	1	0	–	6	–	1
$ – Conference champion

1960 South Central Conference (California) football standings
	Conf.					Overall
Team	W		L		T	W		L		T
Palo Verde +	4	–	1	–	0	7	–	3	–	0
Oceanside-Carlsbad +	4	–	1	–	0	6	–	3	–	0
Antelope Valley	3	–	2	–	0	4	–	4	–	1
Palomar	2	–	3	–	0	2	–	7	–	0
Imperial Valley	1	–	4	–	0	3	–	5	–	0
Santa Barbara City	1	–	4	–	0	2	–	6	–	0
+ – Conference co-champions; Palo Verde forteited a victory over Palomar.

1961 South Central Conference (California) football standings
	Conf.					Overall
Team	W		L		T	W		L		T
Oceanside-Carlsbad +	4	–	1	–	0	7	–	2	–	0
Santa Barbara City +	4	–	1	–	0	7	–	2	–	1
Antelope Valley	3	–	2	–	0	5	–	4	–	0
Southwestern (CA)	2	–	2	–	1	2	–	6	–	1
Imperial Valley	1	–	3	–	1	3	–	5	–	1
Palomar	0	–	5	–	0	0	–	9	–	0
+ – Conference co-champions

1962 South Central Conference (California) football standings
	Conf.					Overall
Team	W		L		T	W		L		T
Imperial Valley $	3	–	0	–	1	7	–	0	–	1
Santa Barbara City	3	–	1	–	0	6	–	1	–	1
Palomar	2	–	2	–	0	7	–	2	–	0
Oceanside-Carlsbad	1	–	2	–	1	5	–	3	–	1
Antelope Valley	0	–	4	–	0	1	–	8	–	0
$ – Conference champion

1963 South Central Conference (California) football standings
	Conf.					Overall
Team	W		L		T	W		L		T
Oceanside-Carlsbad $	5	–	0	–	0	9	–	0	–	0
Santa Barbara City	4	–	1	–	0	6	–	3	–	0
Palomar	3	–	2	–	0	5	–	4	–	0
Antelope Valley	2	–	3	–	0	3	–	6	–	0
Imperial Valley	1	–	4	–	0	2	–	7	–	0
Desert	0	–	5	–	0	0	–	9	–	0
$ – Conference champion

1964 South Central Conference (California) football standings
	Conf.					Overall
Team	W		L		T	W		L		T
Santa Barbara City $	4	–	0	–	0	7	–	3	–	0
Imperial Valley	3	–	1	–	0	6	–	3	–	0
Antelope Valley	2	–	2	–	0	3	–	4	–	1
Oceanside-Carlsbad	1	–	3	–	0	3	–	6	–	0
Desert	0	–	4	–	0	0	–	8	–	0
$ – Conference champion
