= 1968 Jones County Bobcats football team =

American college football season

1968 Jones County Bobcats football

Junior college national champion MJCC champion
- Conference: Mississippi Junior College Conference
- Record: 9–0 (9–0 MJCC)
- Head coach: Sim Cooley (8th season)

1968 Mississippi Junior College Conference football standings
	Conf.					Overall
Team	W		L		T	W		L		T
Jones County $	9	–	0	–	0	9	–	0	–	0
Perkinston	8	–	1	–	0	9	–	1	–	0
East Mississippi	7	–	2	–	0	7	–	2	–	0
Holmes	6	–	3	–	0	6	–	3	–	0
Pearl River	5	–	4	–	0	5	–	4	–	0
Mississippi Delta	5	–	5	–	0	5	–	5	–	0
Southwest Mississippi	5	–	5	–	0	5	–	5	–	0
Northeast Mississippi	4	–	5	–	0	4	–	5	–	0
East Central (MS)	3	–	5	–	1	3	–	5	–	1
Northwest Mississippi	3	–	6	–	0	3	–	6	–	0
Copiah–Lincoln	3	–	6	–	0	3	–	6	–	0
Itawamba	1	–	7	–	1	1	–	7	–	1
Hinds	0	–	9	–	0	0	–	9	–	0
$ – Conference champion

The 1968 Jones County Bobcats football team was an American football team that represented Jones County Junior College (JCJC) as a member of the Mississippi Junior College Conference (MJCC) during the 1968 junior college football season. Led by eighth-year head coach Sim Cooley, the Bobcats compiled a perfect 9–0 record, won the MJCC championship, were ranked No. 1 by Gridwire in its final junior college rankings, and outscored opponents by a total of 298 to 40.

== Schedule ==
Date	Opponent	Site	Result	Source
September 14	Itawamba	Ellisville, MS	W 35–0	
September 19	at East Central (MS)	Decatur, MS	W 56–2	
September 28	Copiah–Lincoln	Ellisville, MS	W 41–6	
October 3	at Hinds	Raymond, MS	W 25–0	
October 19	Southwest Mississippi	Ellisville, MS	W 14–0	
October 24	at Holmes	Goodman, MS	W 35–0	
November 2	at Pearl River	Poplarville, MS	W 26–18	
November 9	Perkinston^{†}	Ellisville, MS	W 28–7	
November 16	Mississippi Delta	Ellisville, MS	W 38–7	
^{†}Homecoming
