= Dick Mansperger =

American football executive (1933–2013)

Personal information
- Born: May 7, 1933; Hemet, California, U.S.
- Died: June 12, 2013 (aged 80); Ramah, New Mexico, U.S.

Career information
- High school: Palo Verde (CA)
- College: Arizona State

Career history

Coaching
- Arizona State (1958); Palo Verde J.C. (1959–1960); West Texas State (1961); Arizona State (1962); UCLA (1963–1964); Iowa (1966)

Operations
- Dallas Cowboys (1965, 1967–1971) Player scout; Dallas Cowboys (1972–1974) Director of player personnel; Seattle Seahawks (1975–1983) Director of player personnel; Dallas Cowboys (1984–1988) College scout; Dallas Cowboys (1989–1991) Director of college scouting

Awards and highlights
- Super Bowl champion (VI)

John Richard Mansperger (May 7, 1933 – June 12, 2013) was a director of player personnel for the Dallas Cowboys and Seattle Seahawks of the National Football League (NFL). He also was a college football coach. He played college football at Arizona State University.

== Early life ==
Mansperger was a native of Blythe, California and attended Palo Verde High School. He later enrolled at Palo Verde Junior College. He transferred to Arizona State University after his sophomore season in 1956. He played tackle under head coaches Dan Devine and Frank Kush, contributing to the team winning 19 of 20 games.

From 1953 to 1956, he served in the Army with an airborne division, reaching the rank of lieutenant.

== Professional career ==
In 1958, he joined the Sun Devils coaching staff as a graduate assistant, helping coach the freshmen team. In 1959, he was named the head coach at Palo Verde Junior College, compiling a 14-3-2 record. In 1961, he was an assistant coach at West Texas State University. In 1962, he returned to coach at Arizona State University. From 1963 to 1964, he was an assistant coach at UCLA.

In 1965, he was hired as a player scout by the Dallas Cowboys. In 1966, he was an assistant coach at Iowa University. In 1967, he returned to the Cowboys in a scout position. In 1972, he was named the team's Director of Player Personnel.

On April 15, 1975, he was named the Director of Player Personnel for the expansion franchise Seattle Seahawks, helping turn them into a winning team in three seasons. By 1983, the Seahawks were in the AFC championship game. He resigned from his post in May 1984.

On May 16, 1984, he was hired as a college scout by the Dallas Cowboys. On May 13, 1989, he was named the Cowboys Director of College Scouting. In May 1992, he resigned from the team and was replaced with Larry Lacewell.

== Personal life ==
Mansperger died in Ramah after a long battle with cancer on June 12, 2013.
