= 1966 junior college football season =

American junior college football season

- National Championship: Shrine Bowl, Savannah, GA (NJCAA)
- Champion(s): Santa Monica (Gridwire); Kilgore (NJCAA)

The 1966 junior college football season was the season of intercollegiate junior college football running from September to December 1966. Kilgore won the NJCAA National Football Championship, defeating Ferrum in the Shrine Bowl in Savannah, Georgia. Santa Monica, champions of the Metropolitan Conference placed in the top spot in Gridwire's final junior college rankings.

Kilgore was co-champion of the Texas Junior College Football Federation (TJCFF) with Henderson County, which won the Junior Rose Bowl over Pasadena. Henderson County finished second in the Gridwire rankings. Laney, which finished the season with a perfect record of 10–0, won the Coast Conference title, and defeated the City College of San Francisco in the Prune Bowl, ranked third. Fullerton, champion of California's Eastern Conference and winner of the Potato Bowl over Fresno City, finished the season 9–0–1 and ranked fourth. NJCAA champion Kilgore was fifth in the Gridwire rankings.

== Conference standings ==
=== California ===
1966 Central Conference football standings
	Conf.					Overall
Team	W		L		T	W		L		T
Coalinga $	6	–	1	–	0	6	–	3	–	0
Merced	5	–	2	–	0	6	–	3	–	0
Reedley	5	–	2	–	0	6	–	3	–	0
Antelope Valley	4	–	3	–	0	5	–	4	–	0
Hancock	4	–	2	–	1	4	–	4	–	1
Porterville	2	–	4	–	1	2	–	6	–	1
Desert	1	–	6	–	0	1	–	8	–	0
Cuesta	0	–	7	–	0	1	–	7	–	1
$ – Conference champion

1966 Coast Conference football standings
	Conf.					Overall
Team	W		L		T	W		L		T
Laney $	7	–	0	–	0	10	–	0	–	0
Hartnell	6	–	1	–	0	8	–	2	–	0
Monterey Peninsula	5	–	2	–	0	6	–	3	–	0
West Valley	3	–	4	–	0	3	–	6	–	0
Menlo	2	–	5	–	0	4	–	5	–	0
Solano	2	–	5	–	0	3	–	6	–	0
Gavilan	2	–	5	–	0	2	–	7	–	0
Cabrillo	1	–	7	–	0	2	–	7	–	0
$ – Conference champion

1966 Eastern Conference (California) football standings
	Conf.					Overall
Team	W		L		T	W		L		T
Fullerton $	7	–	0	–	0	9	–	0	–	1
Riverside	4	–	3	–	0	6	–	3	–	0
San Bernardino	4	–	3	–	0	6	–	4	–	0
Orange Coast	4	–	3	–	0	4	–	5	–	0
Golden West	3	–	3	–	1	5	–	3	–	1
Chaffey	2	–	5	–	0	4	–	5	–	0
Santa Ana	2	–	5	–	0	3	–	6	–	0
Mt. San Antonio	1	–	5	–	1	2	–	6	–	1
$ – Conference champion

1966 Golden Gate Conference football standings
	Conf.					Overall
Team	W		L		T	W		L		T
CC of San Francisco $	7	–	0	–	0	9	–	1	–	0
Diablo Valley	5	–	2	–	0	6	–	3	–	0
San Mateo	4	–	2	–	1	5	–	3	–	1
Contra Costa	4	–	3	–	0	5	–	4	–	0
Chabot	3	–	4	–	0	5	–	4	–	0
San Jose City	2	–	5	–	0	3	–	6	–	0
Merritt	1	–	5	–	1	1	–	7	–	1
Foothill	1	–	6	–	0	3	–	6	–	0
$ – Conference champion

1966 Golden Valley Conference football standings
	Conf.					Overall
Team	W		L		T	W		L		T
Sierra $	5	–	0	–	0	8	–	2	–	0
Shasta	4	–	1	–	0	6	–	3	–	0
Marin	2	–	3	–	0	5	–	4	–	0
Yuba	2	–	3	–	0	2	–	7	–	0
Napa	1	–	4	–	0	4	–	5	–	0
Santa Rosa	1	–	4	–	0	1	–	8	–	0
$ – Conference champion

1966 Metropolitan Conference football standings
	Conf.					Overall
Team	W		L		T	W		L		T
Santa Monica $	7	–	0	–	0	8	–	0	–	1
Cerritos	5	–	1	–	1	6	–	2	–	1
Bakersfield	5	–	2	–	0	7	–	2	–	0
El Camino	3	–	2	–	2	5	–	2	–	2
Long Beach	3	–	3	–	1	5	–	3	–	1
Rio Hondo	2	–	5	–	0	2	–	7	–	0
East Los Angeles	1	–	6	–	0	1	–	8	–	0
Los Angeles Valley	0	–	7	–	0	1	–	8	–	0
$ – Conference champion

1966 Pacific Southwest Conference football standings
	Conf.					Overall
Team	W		L		T	W		L		T
San Diego Mesa +	5	–	1	–	0	9	–	1	–	0
Southwestern (CA) +	5	–	1	–	0	5	–	3	–	0
San Diego Junior College	4	–	2	–	0	5	–	4	–	0
Grossmont	3	–	3	–	0	3	–	6	–	0
Palomar	2	–	4	–	0	2	–	7	–	0
MiraCosta	1	–	5	–	0	3	–	6	–	0
Imperial Valley	1	–	5	–	0	2	–	7	–	0
+ – Conference co-champions

1966 Valley Conference football standings
	Conf.					Overall
Team	W		L		T	W		L		T
Fresno City $	5	–	0	–	0	8	–	2	–	0
American River	4	–	1	–	0	6	–	3	–	0
Sequoias	2	–	3	–	0	6	–	3	–	0
Sacramento City	2	–	3	–	0	5	–	4	–	0
San Joaquin Delta	2	–	3	–	0	2	–	7	–	0
Modesto	0	–	5	–	0	2	–	7	–	0
$ – Conference champion

1966 Western State Conference football standings
	Conf.					Overall
Team	W		L		T	W		L		T
Pasadena $	6	–	0	–	1	8	–	1	–	1
Harbor	5	–	2	–	0	6	–	3	–	0
Los Angeles City	4	–	2	–	1	6	–	2	–	1
Ventura	4	–	3	–	0	5	–	4	–	0
Glendale (CA)	3	–	4	–	0	4	–	4	–	1
Pierce	3	–	4	–	0	4	–	5	–	0
Santa Barbara City	2	–	5	–	0	4	–	5	–	0
Compton	0	–	7	–	0	1	–	8	–	0
$ – Conference champion

=== NCJAA ===
1966 Arizona Junior College Athletic Conference football standings
	Conf.					Overall
Team	W		L		T	W		L		T
Phoenix $	1	–	0	–	1	6	–	2	–	1
Eastern Arizona	1	–	1	–	0	5	–	4	–	0
Arizona Western	0	–	1	–	1	7	–	2	–	1
$ – Conference champion

1966 Intermountain Collegiate Athletic Conference football standings
	Conf.					Overall
Team	W		L		T	W		L		T
Boise $	4	–	0	–	0	9	–	1	–	0
Ricks	3	–	1	–	0	4	–	4	–	0
Mesa (CO)	2	–	2	–	0	5	–	4	–	0
Dixie (UT)	1	–	3	–	0	3	–	5	–	0
Snow	0	–	4	–	0	2	–	7	–	0
$ – Conference champion

1966 Mississippi Junior College Conference football standings
	Conf.					Overall
Team	W		L		T	W		L		T
Perkinston $	8	–	2	–	0	10	–	2	–	0
Northwest Mississippi	7	–	2	–	1	7	–	2	–	1
Holmes	6	–	3	–	1	6	–	3	–	1
Itawamba	6	–	3	–	1	6	–	3	–	1
Hinds	6	–	4	–	0	6	–	4	–	0
Jones County	5	–	5	–	0	5	–	5	–	0
Southwest Mississippi	5	–	5	–	0	5	–	5	–	0
Mississippi Delta	5	–	5	–	0	5	–	5	–	0
East Central (MS)	4	–	5	–	1	4	–	5	–	1
Copiah–Lincoln	3	–	7	–	0	3	–	7	–	0
East Mississippi	3	–	7	–	0	3	–	7	–	0
Pearl River	0	–	10	–	0	0	–	10	–	0
$ – Conference champion

1966 Northern Illinois Junior College Conference football standings
	Conf.					Overall
Team	W		L		T	W		L		T
Wilson $	6	–	0	–	0	8	–	1	–	0
Joliet	5	–	1	–	0	5	–	3	–	0
Wright	3	–	3	–	0	4	–	4	–	0
Thornton	1	–	5	–	0	2	–	6	–	1
Morton	0	–	6	–	0	0	–	7	–	0
$ – Conference champion

1966 Oklahoma Junior College Conference football standings
	Conf.					Overall
Team	W		L		T	W		L		T
Eastern Oklahoma A&M $	3	–	0	–	0	6	–	3	–	0
Connors	2	–	1	–	0	4	–	6	–	0
Murray State (OK)	1	–	2	–	0	3	–	7	–	0
Northern Oklahoma	0	–	3	–	0	1	–	9	–	0
$ – Conference champion

1966 Texas Junior College Football Federation standings
	Conf.					Overall
Team	W		L		T	W		L		T
Henderson County +	6	–	1	–	0	10	–	1	–	0
Kilgore +	6	–	1	–	0	10	–	1	–	0
Cisco	5	–	2	–	0	7	–	2	–	0
Navarro	3	–	4	–	0	5	–	6	–	0
Tyler	3	–	4	–	0	4	–	6	–	0
Blinn	2	–	5	–	0	3	–	6	–	0
Ranger	2	–	5	–	0	3	–	7	–	0
Wharton	1	–	6	–	0	3	–	7	–	0
+ – Conference co-champions

1966 Tri-State Junior College Conference football standings
	Conf.					Overall
Team	W		L		T	W		L		T
Ellsworth $	8	–	0	–	0	8	–	1	–	0
Centerville	5	–	1	–	0	7	–	2	–	0
Mason City	5	–	2	–	1	5	–	2	–	1
Worthington	3	–	2	–	1	3	–	4	–	1
Waldorf	3	–	4	–	0	5	–	4	–	0
Fort Dodge	2	–	5	–	0	2	–	6	–	0
Marshalltown	1	–	3	–	0	5	–	3	–	0
Estherville	1	–	5	–	0	2	–	5	–	0
Norfolk	0	–	6	–	0	0	–	8	–	0
$ – Conference champion

1966 Washington Junior College Conference football standings
	Conf.					Overall
Team	W		L		T	W		L		T
Everett +	5	–	0	–	1	7	–	1	–	1
Columbia Basin +	5	–	0	–	1	6	–	2	–	1
Grays Harbor	3	–	2	–	1	7	–	2	–	1
Shoreline	3	–	2	–	1	3	–	5	–	1
Yakima	2	–	4	–	0	2	–	7	–	0
Wenatchee Valley	1	–	5	–	0	3	–	6	–	0
Olympic	0	–	6	–	0	2	–	8	–	0
+ – Conference co-champions
