= Caesar Frazier =

American musician, keyboard player, producer and jazz, funk and soul recording artist

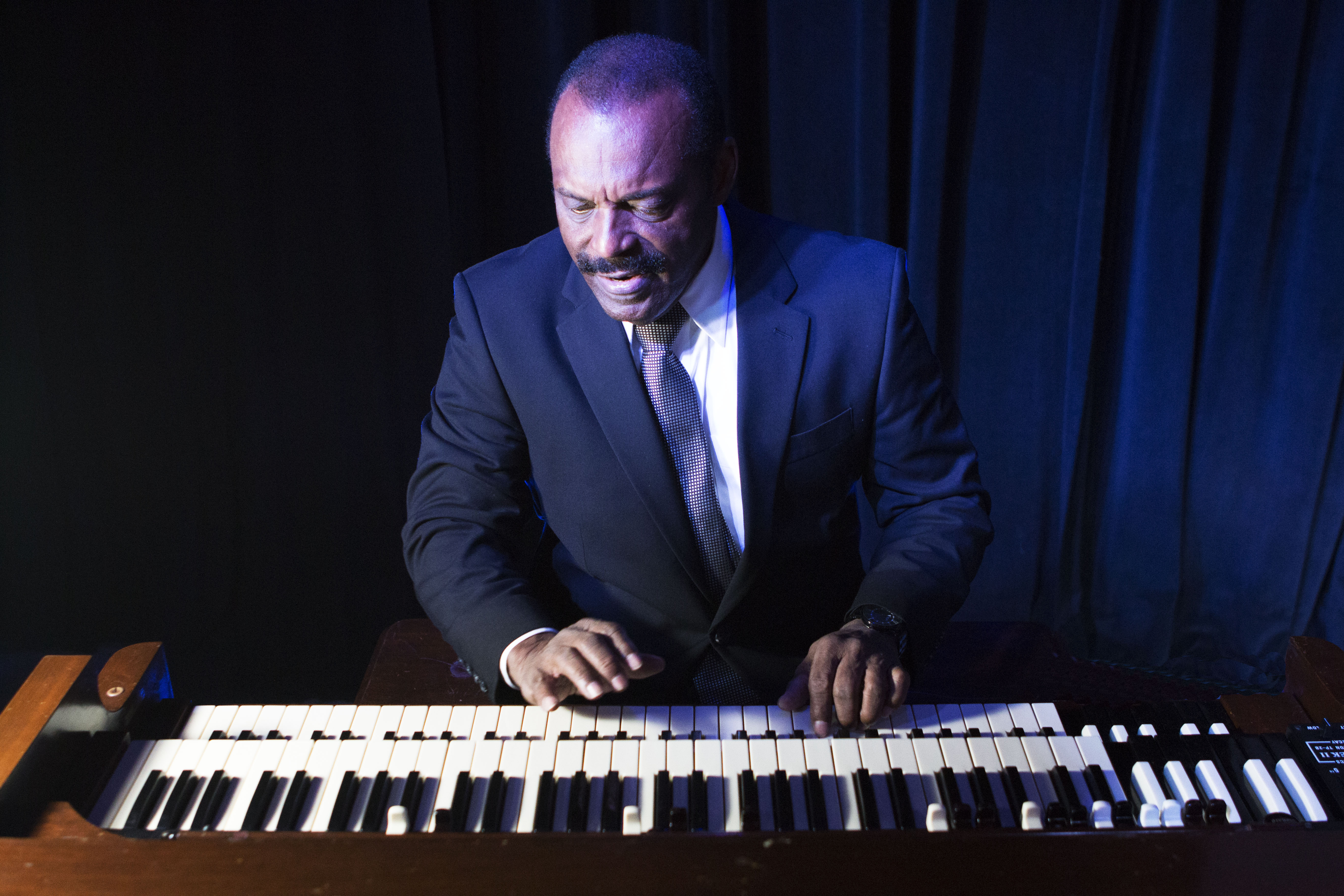

Caesar Frazier is an American musician, keyboard player, producer and jazz, funk and soul recording artist who is best known as the former keyboard player for Marvin Gaye.

Frazier specializes in the Hammond B3, organ and piano and has recorded numerous albums as an instrumentalist, vocalist and studio musician. Over the years, his music has been sampled by Kanye West and Common, in addition to GangStarr, Arrested Development and Johnson & Johnson.

== Early life ==
Born in The Bronx in New York City on September 26, 1947, Frazier grew up in Lake Helen, Florida and began his professional career at age 15, playing organ in R&B bands. He has performed in a number of jazz ensembles, orchestras and as a solo artist over the years. He discovered music at a young age when he lived a block away from a popular juke joint. After earning a B.S. Degree in Music Education from Florida A&M University in Tallahassee, Florida, Frazier established himself as a national and international recording artist. He also attended College of the Desert in Palm Desert, California, where he studied music and photography.

== Career ==
Influenced by the Hammond organ sounds of Jimmy Smith, Jackie Davis, Jimmy McGriff and Jack McDuff, Frazier focused his musical efforts on the jazz organ. He cut his first album Hail Caesar! in 1972, which featured Prestige Records guitarist Melvin Sparks, drummer Idris Muhammad and tenor saxophonist Houston Person. His album Caesar Frazier '75 featured guitarist Cornell Dupree and drummer Bernard "Pretty" Purdie.

Frazier has described Marvin Gaye's album What's Going On as "one of the greatest albums ever recorded."

After decades performing and recording, Frazier earned an Associate Degree in Radio, Television and Film from Saddleback College in Mission Viejo, California. During his broadcasting career, he specialized in news reporting and covered presidential campaigns for U.S. President Bill Clinton, former U.S. Senator Bob Dole and American entrepreneur Ross Perot.

Frazier is the owner of Strickly Grooves Publishing Company and launched his own record label, Track Merchant Records and Track Merchant Media Group, in 2020.

In addition to performing live, Frazier is a popular jazz radio host. He is a former on-air announcer at WLOQ Smooth Jazz radio in Orlando, Florida and currently serves as a feature interview contributor for the jazz radio station at The University of Central Florida. He previously produced and hosted "The Saddleback Forum" talk show at KSBR inMission Viejo, California. Frazier is also an accomplished photographer who has traveled the world shooting landscapes and street journalism.

== Discography ==
- Hail Caesar! (Eastbound, 1972)
- Caesar Frazier '75 (Westbound, 1975)
- Another Life (Westbound/20th Century, 1978)
- Instinct (Doodlin', 2018)
- Closer to the Truth (Savant, 2019)
- Tenacity: As We Speak (Track Merchant, 2022)
- Live at Jazzcup (Stunt, 2023)
- ALIVE: One Night in Savannah (Track Merchant, 2024)
