= 1958 Santa Monica Corsairs football team =

American college football season

1958 Santa Monica Corsairs football

Metropolitan champion Junior Rose Bowl champion

Junior Rose Bowl, W 30–12 vs. Northeastern Oklahoma A&M
- Conference: Metropolitan Conference
- Record: 10–0 (7–0 Metropolitan)
- Head coach: Jim Powers (3rd season)

1958 Metropolitan Conference football standings
	Conf.					Overall
Team	W		L		T	W		L		T
Santa Monica $	7	–	0	–	0	10	–	0	–	0
Bakersfield	6	–	1	–	0	9	–	1	–	0
Long Beach	4	–	2	–	0	6	–	3	–	0
San Diego Junior College	4	–	3	–	0	6	–	3	–	0
Los Angeles Valley	3	–	4	–	0	4	–	5	–	0
El Camino	2	–	4	–	0	3	–	5	–	0
East Los Angeles	1	–	6	–	0	3	–	6	–	0
Harbor	0	–	7	–	0	2	–	7	–	0
$ – Conference champion; The game between Long Beach and El Camino on November 22 was stopped in the third quarter because of fog. The conference ruled the game a no contest.

The 1958 Santa Monica Corsairs football team was an American football team that represented Santa Monica City College (now known as Santa Monica College) as a member of the Metropolitan Conference during the 1958 junior college football season. In their third year under head coach Jim Powers, the Corsairs compiled a perfect 10–0 record, won the Metropolitan Conference championship, defeated Northeastern Oklahoma A&M in the Junior Rose Bowl, and outscored all opponents by a total of 389 to 139.

Players included quarterback Pat Young, halfbacks Bernie Coffee and Lloyd Winston, fullback George Pierovich, ends Dave Washington and Leon Cadis, center Ivory Jones, and tackle Marv Marinovich. Winston was named "Player of the Game" in the Junior Rose Bowl and later played for the San Francisco 49ers. Marinovich played for the Oakland Raiders.

Three Santa Monica players were selected as first-team players on the Junior College All-America team: Pat Young at quarterback; Lloyd Winston at halfback; and Dave Washington at end. Ivory Jones was selected as the center on the second team.

The team played its home games at Corsair Field in Santa Monica, California.

== Schedule ==
Date	Opponent	Site	Result	Attendance	Source
September 26	at Ventura*	Poli Stadium; Ventura, CA	W 30–16	5,000	
October 11	at San Diego Junior College	Balboa Stadium; San Diego, CA	W 16–6		
October 17	El Camino	Corsair Field; Santa Monica, CA	W 32–8	8,500	
October 25	at Long Beach	Veterans Stadium; Long Beach, CA	W 38–12	4,800	
October 31	Bakersfied	Corsair Field; Santa Monica, CA	W 30–23	13,000	
November 8	Harbor^{†}	Santa Monica, CA	W 70–0		
November 14	at Los Angeles Valley		W 66–14	7,500	
November 22	East Los Angeles	Corsair Feld; Santa Monica, CA	W 24–12		
November 27	at Mesa*	Grand Junction, CO	W 53–34	1,500	
December 13	vs. Northeastern Oklahoma A&M*	Rose Bowl; Pasadena, CA (Little Rose Bowl)	W 30–12	50,797	
*Non-conference game; ^{†}Homecoming
