= 1968 Ferrum Panthers football team =

American college football season

1968 Ferrum Panthers football

NJCAA national champion

Shrine Bowl, W 41–19 vs. Phoenix
- Conference: Independent
- Record: 10–0
- Head coach: Hank Norton (9th season)

The 1968 Ferrum Panthers football team was an American football team that represented Ferrum Junior College during the 1968 junior college football season. In their ninth year under head coach Hank Norton, the Panthers compiled a perfect 10–0 record and won the NJCAA National Football Championship. It was Ferrm's second consecutive undefeated and untied regular season, though the 1967 team lost to Kilgore in the championship game.

Key players included halfback Horace Green and quarterback Butch DuSharm.

== Schedule ==
Date	Opponent	Site	Result	Attendance	Source
September 14	at Frederick Military Academy		W 21–7		
September 21	at Apprentice	Apprentice field; Newport News, VA	W 17–3		
September 28	Wesley	Rocky Mount, VA	W 27–0		
October 5	East Tennessee junior varsity	Rocky Mount, VA	W 47–0		
October 12	at Chowan	Murfreesboro, NC	W 45–27		
October 19	at Gardner–Webb	Boiling Springs, NC	W 21–17		
October 26	at Northeastern Oklahoma A&M	Miami, OK	W 29–19		
November 2	Lees–McRae^{†}	Rocky Mount, VA	W 28–7		
November 16	at Marion	Marion, AL	W 23–18		
November 29	vs. Phoenix	Savannah, GA (Shrine Bowl)	W 41–19	12,000	
^{†}Homecoming
