= 1970 Fort Scott Greyhounds football team =

American college football season

1970 Fort Scott Greyhounds football

Junior college national champion

Shrine Bowl, W 41–20 vs. Mesa (AZ)
- Conference: Kansas Jayhawk Junior College Conference
- Record: 11–0 (8–0 KJJCC)
- Head coach: Dick Foster (2nd season)

1970 Kansas Jayhawk Junior College Conference football standings
	Conf.					Overall
Team	W		L		T	W		L		T
Fort Scott $	8	–	0	–	0	11	–	0	–	0
Hutchinson	7	–	1	–	0	9	–	1	–	1
Garden City	6	–	2	–	0	7	–	3	–	0
Pratt	5	–	3	–	0	6	–	4	–	0
Cowley County	4	–	4	–	0	6	–	4	–	0
Butler County	3	–	5	–	0	4	–	6	–	0
Independence	1	–	7	–	0	2	–	8	–	0
Highland (KS)	1	–	7	–	0	1	–	8	–	0
Coffeyville	1	–	7	–	0	1	–	9	–	0
Dodge City *	0	–	0	–	0	4	–	5	–	0
$ – Conference champion; * Dodge City was on probation.

The 1970 Fort Scott Greyhounds football team was an American football team that represented Fort Scott Community College as a member of the Kansas Jayhawk Junior College Conference (KJJCC) during the 1970 junior college football season. In their second and final year under head coach Dick Foster, the Greyhounds compiled a perfect 11–0 record, won the KJJCC championship, defeated the Mesa Hokams of Mesa, Arizona, in the Shrine Bowl, and were selected as the junior college national champion in the final JC Gridwire poll of 1970.

Fort Scott led all junior colleges in total offense and ranked second in total defense. The program took national individual honors with Dick Foster being named junior college coach of the year, Tommy Reamon back of the year, and Mitch Sutton lineman of the year. Reamon also led the country in total offense, scoring, and rushing.

== Schedule ==
Date	Opponent	Site	Result	Attendance	Source
September 11	at Cowley County	Arkansas City, KS	W 25–9		
September 19	Butler County	Fort Scott, KS	W 50–0		
September 26	at Independence	Independence, KS	W 64–0		
October 3	Hutchinson	Fort Scott, KS	W 31–7		
October 10	at Pratt	Pratt, KS	W 23–0		
October 17	Dodge City*	Fort Scott, KS	W 54–0		
October 31	Highland (KS)	Fort Scott, KS	W 61–0		
November 6	Central Missouri State freshmen*		W 59–13		
November 14	at Garden City	Garden City, KS	W 14–12		
November 26	vs. Mesa (AZ)*	Savannah, GA (Shrine Bowl)	W 41–20		
*Non-conference game
