= College of the Desert =

Community college in Palm Desert, California, US

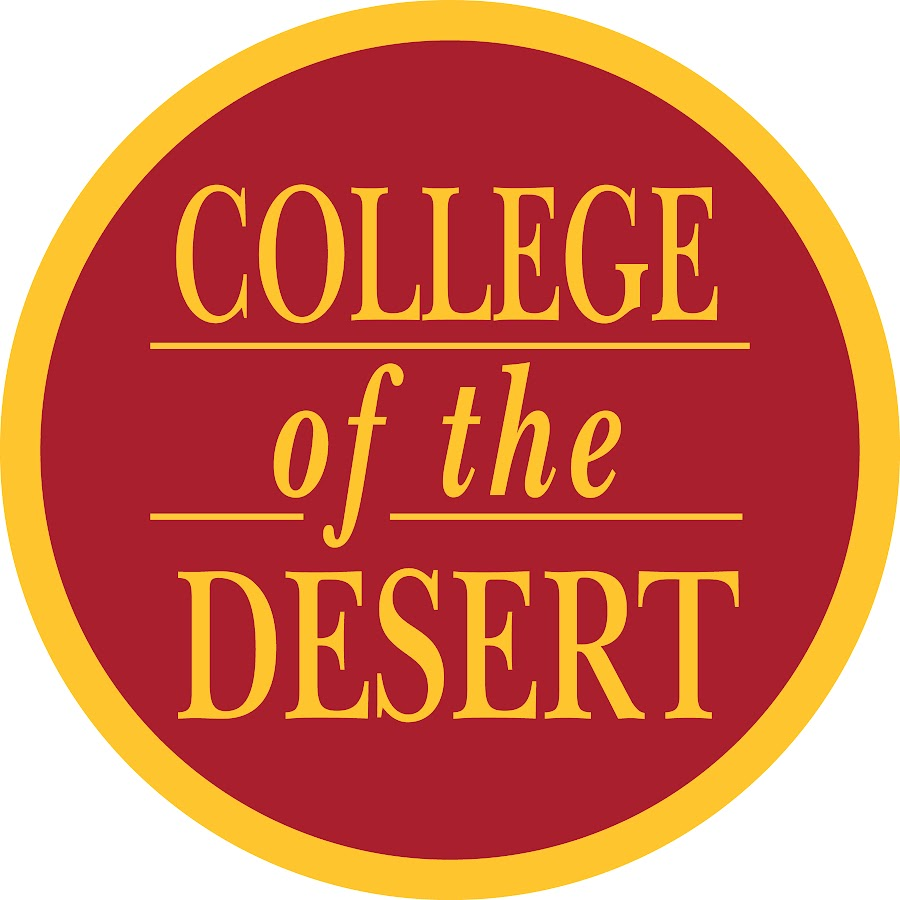
- Motto: I Am COD
- Type: Public community college
- Established: 1958; 68 years ago
- President: Val Martinez Garcia
- Administrative staff: 1,245
- Students: 12,453
- Location: Palm Desert, California, United States
- Campus: Suburban, 160 acres (65 ha)
- Colors: (Roadrunner) Red and (Desert) Gold
- Nickname: Roadrunners
- Mascot: Rodney
- Website: www.collegeofthedesert.edu

College of the Desert (COD) is a public community college in Palm Desert, California. COD enrolls about 12,500 students, of which around one third attend college full-time. It serves the Coachella Valley of Riverside County. The college is federally recognized as a Hispanic-serving institution (HSI), receiving Title V grants.

== History ==
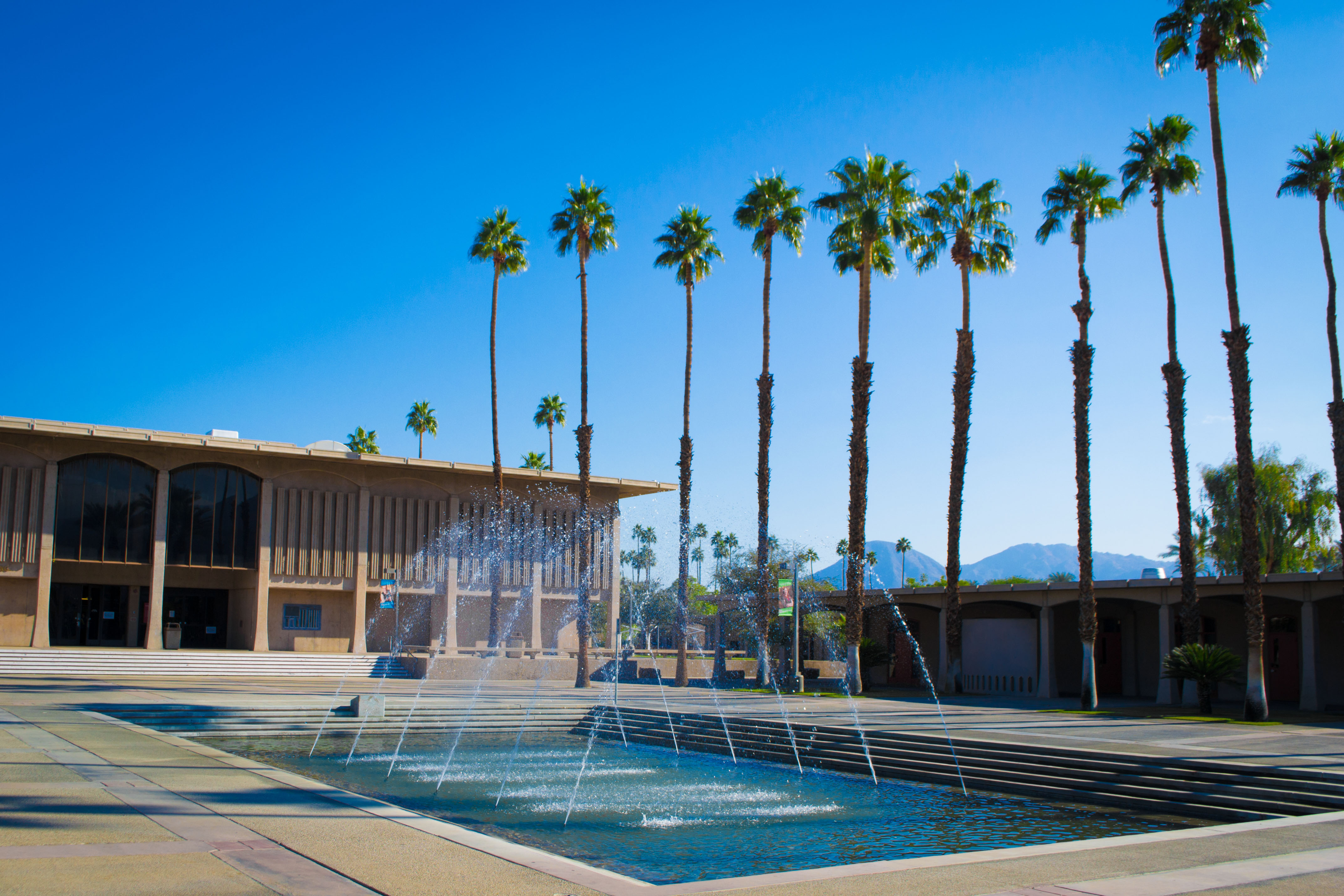
The "International Fountain of Knowledge" on the campus of College of the Desert

College of the Desert was established in 1958 after a decade of planning for a junior college district in the Coachella Valley. Voters approved the formation of the district and funded the building of the COD campus with a bond issue. On September 21, 1962, the new college opened on its 160-acre (65 ha) site in Palm Desert, and in 1966 it gained accreditation.

The Jeane and Justin Hilb student center and the Carol L. Meier Lecture Hall opened in 1998, and Bob and his wife "Mike" Pollock funded the creation of the COD campus's Theatre One in 1999. The Marks Center for the Arts was funded by Don and Peggy Cravens, Bob and Barbara Leberman, and the COD Alumni Association in 2003. Their support has permitted COD to further upgrade and expand its arts facilities into 2006 and beyond. College of the Desert's library building, opened in 1996, is unique in California as the only one that is shared by a college with both a city (Palm Desert) and a county (Riverside) library.

From 1966 to 1999, residents in the High Desert to the north of the Coachella Valley were also part of the community college district. Their affiliated Copper Mountain Campus in Twentynine Palms was opened in 1984 and remained with the district until 1999, when it was renamed Copper Mountain College and became an independent district.

In 2001, the Eastern Valley Center opened to address a need for more English and ethnic studies classes, such as Mexican American Culture and Intro to African American Literature, as well as for a campus located in the eastern Coachella Valley's agricultural and casino gaming corridor. More than 1,400 students are enrolled in the Eastern Valley Center located in Indio.

== Students ==
Race	Percentage
Hispanic	77%
White	13%
Multiracial	3%
African American	2%
Asian	2%
Filipino	2%
Unknown	1%

== Athletics ==
Desert Roadrunners
- School: College of the Desert
- Association: CCCAA
- Conference: Inland Empire Athletic Conference (IEAC)
- Athletic director: Gary Plunkett
- Location: Palm Desert, California
- Varsity teams: 15 teams
- Football stadium: Robert F. Boone Field
- Basketball arena: COD Gymnasium at the Bragdon & Inez Garrow Athletic Quad
- Baseball stadium: Ted Hamilton Field
- Mascot: Roadrunners
- Website: codathletics.com

College of the Desert is a member of the Inland Empire Athletic Conference (IEAC) for 9 of its 15 sports. The Roadrunners programs, such as men's golf, beach volleyball, women's golf, and women's tennis, compete in other southern California athletic conferences because there are fewer than four IEAC member schools with each of those sports. COD football is a member of the American Division-Mountain Conference in the Southern California Football Association (SCFA). Each sport has a different competitive alignment within the conference.

COD competes with Antelope Valley College, (Football Only), Barstow College, Cerro Coso Community College, Chaffey College, Citrus College (Football Only), Copper Mountain College, Crafton Hills College, Mt. San Jacinto College, Norco College, Palo Verde College, San Bernardino Valley College and Victor Valley College.

Because the sport of football is in its own autonomous Athletic Conference, the Southern California Football Association, COD competes against these schools in the American Division - Mountain Conference: Antelope Valley College, Citrus College, Mt. San Jacinto College, San Bernardino Valley College and Victor Valley College.

Women's basketball, men's basketball, and women's volleyball play their home games in the COD Gymnasium at the Bragdon & Inez Garrow Athletic Quad. The gym was built in 2014. Prior to 2014, COD competed in the Harold & Hazel Wright Gymnasium, which has since been demolished and replaced by tennis courts. Football plays their home games at Robert F. Boone Field. Boone started a mechanical equipment company in Los Angeles at the age of 39 and was a member of the college's President Circle when he donated $100,000 to the College of the Desert Foundation for the naming rights to the field. Baseball plays their games at Ted Hamilton Field, named in honor of a former Kansas City Royals scout who lived in Indian Wells, California and was a supporter of Roadrunners Baseball.

Fall Sports:

- Cross Country (men's)
- Cross country (women's)
- Soccer (men's)
- Soccer (women's)
- Golf (women's)
- Football
- Volleyball (women's)

Winter Sports:

- Basketball (men's)
- Basketball (women's)

Spring Sports:

- Baseball
- Softball
- Beach volleyball (women's)
- Golf (men's)
- Tennis (men's)
- Tennis (women's)

=== Football trophy games ===
The Roadrunners have two football "trophy games" each season, the longest running of which is "The Palms-to-Pines" game which occurs each season against the Mt. San Jacinto College Eagles. The trophy was sponsored by The Desert Sun beginning in 1970, but that sponsorship has been discontinued for some time. "The Palms-to-Pines" game has taken place every year since the Eagles added an athletics program in 1967. The other trophy game is the "COD-SBVC Challenge Trophy" game, which has occurred off-and-on since 1981, with San Bernardino Valley College.

== Notable alumni ==
- Bruce Blakeman, politician and political commentator
- Reggie Brown, professional football player
- Carson Daly, television host, radio personality, producer
- Gar Forman, professional basketball manager
- Caesar Frazier, musician, producer and jazz, funk and soul recording artist
- Eduardo Garcia, politician represents the 56th Assembly District
- Brent Geiberger, professional golfer
- Jordan Howlett, social media personality, known online as "Jordan the Stallion"
- Michael Irby, actor
- Malcolm Kokocinski, professional golfer
- Mike Leach, college football coach
- Jack Renner, professional golfer
- Bryan Robinson, professional football player
- Victor Rojas, television analyst for the Los Angeles Angels
- Jimmie Villalobos, American soccer player
- John Wilson, professional golfer
