= Barstow Community College =

Public college in Barstow, California, US

- Barstow College
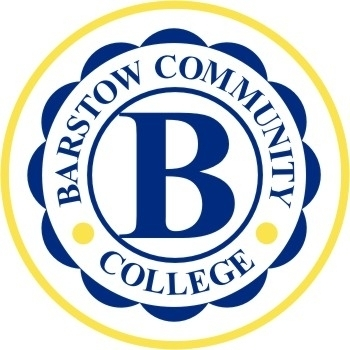
- Type: Public community college
- Established: 1959
- Parent institution: California Community Colleges
- Superintendent/president: Eva Bagg
- Faculty: 235 full-time and part-time instructors
- Administrative staff: 150
- Students: 3,746
- Postgraduates: none
- Location: Barstow, California, United States
- Campus: Barstow and Ft. Irwin
- Colors: Yellow and blue
- Nickname: Vikings
- Sporting affiliations: CCCAA – WSC
- Mascot: Viking
- Website: www.barstow.edu

Barstow Community College is a public community college in Barstow, California. It is an open-admission college serving more than 3,700 students in degree and certificate programs with approximately 120 faculty members. It provides the first two years of college or university study as part of the California Community Colleges. The college's educational program includes lower-division course work, general education offerings, and vocational courses for transfer to baccalaureate degree institutions. The college offers occupational programs designed to prepare students for entry into the workforce. Service learning and self-enrichment classes are also offered to the community.

== History ==
The Barstow Community College district was established in September 1959 by the citizens of the upper High Desert region of Southern California. Evening classes began the next year at Barstow High School, followed by the first day of classes in fall 1962 at Barstow First Methodist Church. The campus was constructed in 1964 at its current location on Barstow Road and the first classes began in February 1965. Presently, the campus of Barstow Community College represents the standards of any college campus in the U.S. and includes: instructional halls, gym, athletic fields, tennis courts, cafeteria, student center, state of the art library, amphitheater, fine arts center, and numerous administrative and technical buildings.

Barstow Community College's vocational program was revamped in 2006 to meet the needs of the community and workforce. In 2010, a partnership between a local business leader and a charter school emerged and the Center for Workforce and Economic Development (a partnership between Barstow Community College and Excelsior Charter School) was formed. Ninety percent of the college's Career Technical Education (CTE) programs are centrally located in one facility and include Solar Technology, Logistics and Warehousing, Electrical, Building Construction Trades Technology, HVAC, Automotive and Diesel Technology, Photography and Welding. The college completed the renovation of its student services center (Norman Smith Student Services Center) in 2009 and began construction of a 700-seat Performing Arts Center in October 2010 and opened Fall of 2014. A two-story Wellness Center (located behind the current James R. Parks gymnasium), complete with an indoor track broke ground in late 2011.

== Academics ==
Barstow Community College is accredited by the Accrediting Commission for Community and Junior Colleges. Barstow Community College offers the Associate of Arts and Associate of Science degrees.

Student demographics as of Fall 2023
Race and ethnicity	Total
Hispanic	45%
White	23%
African American	18%
Multiracial	7%
Asian	3%
American Indian/Alaska Native	1%
Filipino	1%
Pacific Islander	1%
Unknown	1%

== Location ==
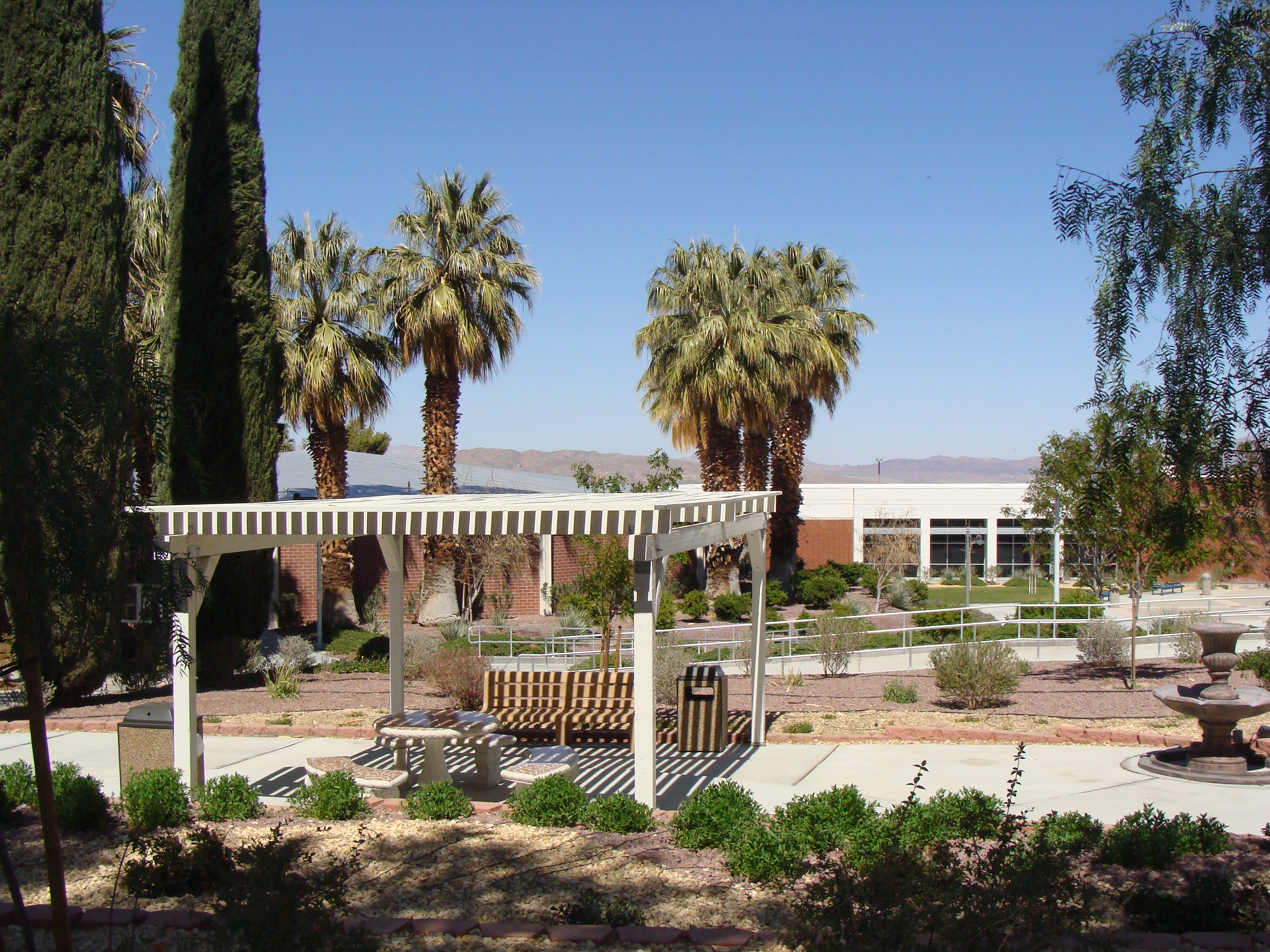
View of the campus

BCC is located on State Route 247 in the Mojave Desert region of San Bernardino County, California, approximately 120 miles (190 km) from both Los Angeles and Las Vegas. The college district covers the area from the Nevada state line, bounded by Kern and Inyo counties and the San Bernardino Mountains. BCC serves the communities of Barstow, Lenwood, Newberry Springs, Daggett, Yermo, Hinkley, Ludlow, and Baker. Barstow Community College also provides on-site instruction to the U.S. Army National Training Center at Ft. Irwin and offers online classes through Distance Education.

Barstow Community College District is bordered by Antelope Valley at the west, Ridgecrest to the distant northwest, Victorville to the south, and to the distant southeast by Joshua Tree. It is the northernmost Community College District in San Bernardino County and the last college on I-15 before the Nevada Stateline.

== Athletics ==
The college's athletic teams are known as the Vikings. As of 2026, the college sponsors seven varsity teams: baseball, men's and women's basketball, men's and women's cross country, softball and volleyball. Barstow competes as a member of the California Community College Athletic Association (CCCAA) in the Western State Conference (WSC).

== Notable alumni ==
- Joe Baca, congressman
- Justin Leone, professional baseball player
- Dan Norman, professional baseball player
- Greg Martinez, professional baseball player
