= Victor Valley College =

Community college in Victorville, California, US

- Motto: Educating Generations, Building Communities
- Type: Public community college
- Established: 1961
- Parent institution: California Community College System
- Academic affiliations: California State University, San Bernardino, Azusa Pacific University, University of La Verne
- President: Daniel Walden
- Administrative staff: 803
- Students: 11,504 (2013)
- Location: Victorville, California, U.S. 34°28′25″N 117°54′44″W
- Campus: Suburban, 253 acres (102 ha)
- Colors: Maroon and gold
- Nickname: Rams
- Sporting affiliations: CCCAA – WSC, SCFA (football), SCWA (wrestling)
- Website: www.vvc.edu

Victor Valley College is a public community college in Victorville, California. It is part of the California Community College System. The Victor Valley Community College district includes Victorville, Hesperia, Apple Valley, Phelan and Adelanto.

== History ==
The college was created by a vote of the public in 1960 and the first classes were held in 1961 at Victor Valley High School in an unused building. The 253-acre (102 ha) campus started construction in 1963 and was opened to students in 1965.

During the 1990s and 2000s, the campus went through a number of improvements as the resident population of the High Desert increased, most notably an Adaptive Physical Education Building, Advanced Technology Building, Gymnasium, Library, an expanded Performing Arts Center, Planetarium, and the Student Activities Center.

On February 14, 2012, Victor Valley Community College District opened its first satellite campus in Apple Valley called the Regional Public Safety Training Center just northwest of the Apple Valley County Airport (nicknamed the Eastside Center in the Five-Year Plan.) The new center contains 46,000 sq. ft. of classrooms, conference rooms, laboratories, and lecture halls. Directly outside the center, a prop area called "CERT City" (named after County of San Bernardino Community Emergency Response Team) has large vehicles, a hazard tower and disaster areas for simulated exercises. Construction on the second satellite campus, the "Westside" Workforce Development Center in West Hesperia remains in the planning stages with hopes to complete the project before 2020.

== Academics ==
The college provides nearly 40 major courses of study, with the most popular being Liberal Arts, Registered Nursing, and Business Management. As a junior college, VVC awards associate degrees. Thirty-three of these programs offer associate degrees in either Associate of Arts (A.A.) or Associates of Science (A.S.), along with California's Associates Transfer Degree (AA-T or AS-T) which guarantees admission to either Cal State University or University of California campuses that participate in the program. Offices are also present on-site from universities in partnership with VVC to allow distance education coursework in a handful of majors that provide students with bachelor's degrees.

There are also Certificates of Achievement or Certificates of Participation for 128 Vocational subjects including Administration of Justice, Fire Technology, Construction, Computer Networking and Repair, and Medical/Nursing.

== Geography ==
Location

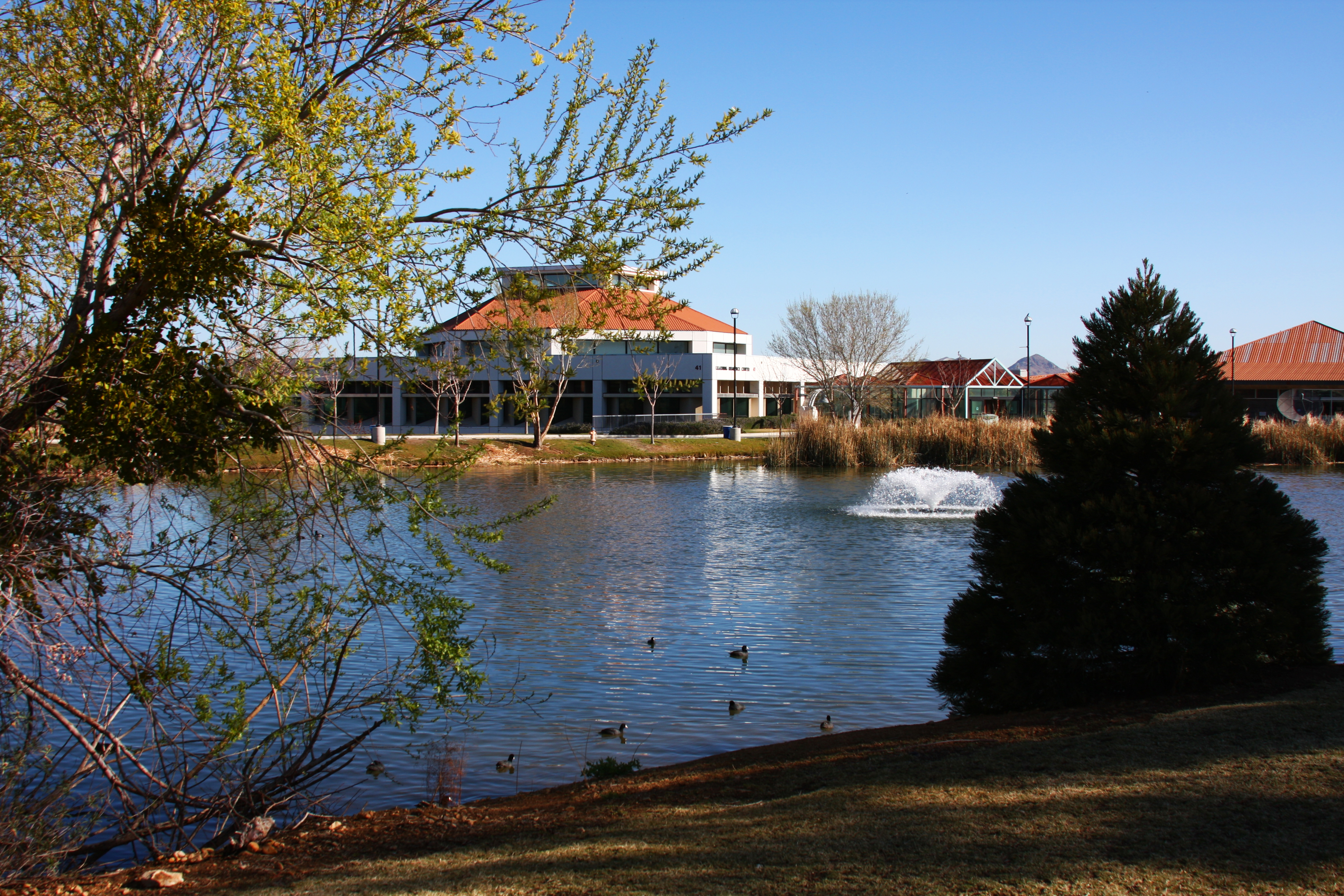
Victor Valley College campus

Victor Valley College lies on the southern edge of the Mojave Desert. The college sits directly to the south of Spring Valley Lake (a planned unincorporated community in San Bernardino County). It is located at the confluence of Victorville, Hesperia, and Apple Valley. The property lies at the most southeastern point in the city of Victorville. Directly south of the campus is Hesperia and east of the campus past the Mojave River is the town of Apple Valley. The San Bernardino and San Gabriel mountain ranges lie approximately 15 miles to the south, southeast, and southwest of the college.

The Community College District boundaries are set east of Antelope Valley, south of Barstow, north of both San Bernardino and Rancho Cucamonga (both sharing a common border from Victorville), and northwest of Joshua Tree. The boundaries are mostly for planning and research only, as California Community College campuses statewide practice Open Enrollment policies; students are not restricted to attending any community college based on their residence status within the State of California.

Campus property

Victor Valley College is split into Upper and Lower campuses by a 60 feet (18 m) escarpment running through the school property. The Upper Campus sits on the bluff (plateau) and is bounded on the west by Spring Valley Lake Parkway. The upper-campus academic and administration buildings are clustered around the man-made Sewell Pond (2,877 feet (877 m) above sea level). The Lower Campus lies in the Mojave River floodplain adjacent to the Mojave River and the Mojave Fish Hatchery, which is run by the State of California. The Lower Campus is home to many of the career technical programs and athletic facilities. The land directly north of the campus property (adjacent to Spring Valley Lake and golf course) offers additional expansion room, which is somewhat limited by hilly terrain, washes, and a natural debris flow zone. Bear Valley Road physically limits Victor Valley College on the south, being a major highway as well as the city limit of Hesperia.

== Population ==
Fall Demographics of student body
Ethnic Breakdown	2022
Hispanic and Latino American	64%
Non-Hispanic White	18%
African American	10%
Asian American	2%
American Indian	<1%
Hawaiian/Pacific Islander	<1%
Multiracial Americans	>5%
International students	<1%
Unknown	1%
Female	60%
Male	40%

In the fall of 2022, the college enrolled 12,684 full-time. A full-time staff of approximately 600 classified, management, and instructional employees are on duty, which includes approximately 110 full-time instructors and 213 part-time instructors. In that semester, the college ranked last in the state in terms of "Percentage of FTEF to Full-Time Faculty" (35.7%).

=== Student demographics ===
Student race and ethnicity statistics for the fall 2022 semester show that VVC is 64% Hispanic/Latino, 18% White, and 10% Black or African-American. 71% of the student body is under the age of 25 years, and 42% of the campus attends in-person, with 31% having some distance education courses in their schedule and 28% attend only in distance education classes.

The following statistics apply out of all students who complete their programs of study within 150% of their "normal time" attending college (Completion of a Degree or Certificate objective within three years of enrolling for the first time):

- 16% Graduation Rate (Students completing an A.A. or A.S. degree)
- 15% of students transferring out to a 4-year college/university (regardless of A.A./A.S. completion). VVC is a "feeder school" to California State University, San Bernardino with most transferees having attended VVC to complete their undergraduate work for the university.
- 14% of the male student body graduates versus 17% of the female population
- In Fall 2010, 100% of the students who were non-resident aliens graduated, with the second higher group being students who identify as multi-racial at 20%.

150% of the "normal time" is also the same amount of time used to permit attendance to California Community Colleges under Federal Financial Aid programs, which is why statistics are not generally announced on students who exceed college attendance over three continuous years.

== Measure JJ and future projects ==
Plans in 2007 called for funding and facility improvements to handle up to 30,000 students by 2017. A general obligation bond, Measure JJ was approved by the residents of the Victor Valley in November 2008.

These construction projects are documented in the District's Five-Year Plan and are ongoing (estimated completion academic years listed below).

- Liberal Arts Modernization - 2015/16
- Student Services/Admin Building 2016/17
- Visual/Performing Arts Lab Building - 2016/17
- Vocational Tech (Auto/Welding Only) - Pending Future Update
- West Side Center - Awaiting Due Diligence

== Transportation ==
Victor Valley Transit Authority operates two public-access bus stops on campus. One bus stop acts as a transfer point to connect to routes in the Victor Valley region. Bicycle loaders are common on these buses and bicycle racks are provided throughout the campus.

The closest freeway access to Victor Valley College is on Interstate 15 to the West approximately seven miles away on Bear Valley Road.

== Athletics ==
Victor Valley College's athletic teams are nicknamed the Rams. The college currently sponsors eight men's and seven women's varsity teams. The college competes as a member of the California Community College Athletic Association (CCCAA) in the Western State Conference (WSC) for all sports except football and wrestling, which competes in Southern California Football Association (SCFA) and Southern California Wrestling Association (SCWA).

== Notable alumni ==
- Earl W. Bascom, inventor, actor, rodeo cowboy, Hall of Fame inductee, international artist and sculptor
- John W. Henry, commodities broker and principal owner of Liverpool Football Club, the Boston Red Sox, The Boston Globe, and co-owner of Roush Fenway Racing
- Joe Stevenson, winner of The Ultimate Fighter 2, professional mixed martial artist formerly fighting for the Ultimate Fighting Championship
- Jamel Richardson, CFL player
