= Palo Verde College =

Community college in Blythe, California, US

Palo Verde Community College
- Type: Public community college
- Established: 1947
- President: Bruce Moses
- Students: 2,261
- Location: Blythe, California, United States; 33°39′44″N 114°39′10″W
- Campus: Rural, 200 acres (81 ha) main campus
- Nickname: Pirates
- Website: www.paloverde.edu

Palo Verde College, formerly Palo Verde Junior College, is a public community college in Blythe, California.

== Main campus ==
Palo Verde College is located along the Colorado River in the fertile Palo Verde Valley, 165 miles (266 km) west of Phoenix, 110 miles (180 km) east of Palm Springs, and 100 miles (160 km) north of Yuma. Its service area includes approximately 20,556 people, 12,456 of whom reside in Blythe.

== Needles Center ==
The Palo Verde College District began serving Needles and surrounding area in 1998 when an agreement was reached to transfer responsibility with the San Bernardino CCD which had been providing limited classes to the area since 1968. Beginning in the Fall 1998, Palo Verde College began offering classes in the evening at Needles High School campus. Almost immediately, a search began for a permanent site for the college, which would allow a full array of classes to be offered, both in the daytime as well as the evening.

== Notable alumni ==
- Jim Criner, former college football head coach
- Dick Mansperger, former NFL executive

== Scandal ==
In 2003, Riverside Community College officials William O'Rafferty, associate vice president of academic affairs; Steven Bailey, dean of public safety; and Robert Curtin, associate dean of public safety, were convicted on felony charges of fraud, embezzlement, grand theft and misappropriation of public funds with regard to public safety classes. The scheme allowed students to take multiple classes at the same time and often gave credit for classes taken at different campuses without attendance. All three Riverside Community College officials were former Riverside County sheriff's deputies. The three dealt exclusively with Al Stremble, Assistant Superintendent of Palo Verde College and a San Bernardino County Reserve Sheriff's Deputy. Palo Verde College was required to repay $713,000 it obtained illegally as part of the scheme.
