= Imperial Valley College =

Community college in Imperial County, California, US

- Motto: Where Success Begins
- Type: Public community college
- Established: 1962
- President: Lennor M. Johnson
- Administrative staff: 151 full-time
- Undergraduates: 7,000
- Postgraduates: N/A
- Location: Imperial, California, U.S. 32.828°N 115.504°W
- Campus: Rural
- Colors: Red and black
- Nickname: Desert Warriors
- Sporting affiliations: CCCAA – PCAC
- Website: www.imperial.edu

Imperial Valley College is a public community college in Imperial County, California. It was founded in 1962 and enrolls around 7,000 students per year. The main campus is located on a 160-acre (0.65 km^{2}) site in the city of Imperial with extended campuses in El Centro and Brawley.

Imperial Valley College, Imperial, California

== History ==
=== Early origins (1922–1950) ===
Imperial Valley College traces its origins to 1922 with the establishment of Central Junior College, located on the campus of Central Union High School in El Centro. In 1924, Brawley Junior College opened at Brawley Union High School, expanding access to post-secondary education in the northern part of the Imperial Valley.

Both institutions saw growth until World War II, when student enrollment declined significantly. As a result, Brawley Junior College closed in 1947 due to insufficient attendance. Central Junior College continued operating and awarded its first Associate in Arts degree in 1934.

=== Name and district formation (1951–1960) ===
In 1951, students and faculty advocated for a name that would reflect the broader community the college served. The board of trustees approved the change and the institution was officially renamed Imperial Valley College.

By the late 1950s, enrollment increases and space limitations prompted local leaders to pursue a dedicated campus. On October 6, 1959, voters in Imperial County overwhelmingly supported the creation of a countywide junior college district, with a record-setting vote of thirteen to one in favor of bonds to finance a new campus.

=== Campus establishment and growth (1960s–present) ===
Following the bond measure, a 160-acre site at the intersection of Highway 111 and Aten Road was selected for the new campus. The campus officially opened in 1962.

In 1971, the district was renamed the Imperial Community College District to reflect its close relationship with the region it serves. The college has since expanded its academic programs and student services.

While Brawley Junior College officially closed in 1947 due to low enrollment, the original building continues to serve students as part of the classroom facilities at Brawley Union High School, preserving a tangible connection to the region’s early post-secondary education efforts.

During the construction of the Aten Road campus in the early 1960s, IVC classes were conducted in temporary buildings at Imperial High School. These structures were later moved to the Aten Road site and remained in use as classrooms for approximately five decades.

The building that once housed IVC on the Central Union High School (CUHS) campus continued to serve as a high school facility until it was demolished to make way for a new STEM building, which opened in 2021.

=== Superintendents and presidents ===
Since the formation of the Imperial Community College District in 1960, Imperial Valley College has been led by a series of superintendents and presidents responsible for overseeing academic programs, administrative operations, and community engagement.

No.	Name	Years of service
1	Milo P. Johnson	1960–1963
2	Terrel Spencer	1963–1978
3	Dan Angel	1978–1981
4	John A. DePaoli	1981–1995
5	Gilbert M. Dominguez	1996–2002
6	Paul Pai	2003–2007
7	Ed Gould	2008–2011
8	Victor M. Jaime	2012–2018
9	Martha Garcia	2018–2021
10	Lennor M. Johnson	2024-present

== Athletics ==
=== Mascot ===
Because of the desert location, the mascot "Arabs" was originally chosen. However, the college's leadership later intermittently considered changing this because the mascot became a distraction for athletic teams traveling out of the valley. An unsuccessful push to change the mascot was launched during the spring 2009 academic semester.

In March 2021, after a Town Hall meeting to consider the matter, held in October 2020 featuring vociferous community and student objection to retaining the "Arabs" mascot, the board of trustees voted to change the school mascot in June 2023, with the new mascot being the "Desert Warriors".
