= Pate (surname) =

Pate is a surname. Notable people with the surname include:

- Alan Pate (born 1963), American golfer
- Alexs Pate (born 1950), American writer
- Amber Pate (born 1995), Australian road racing cyclist
- Archie Pate (1886–1936), American Negro league baseball player
- Ashby Pate (born 1978), American lawyer and former associate justice of Palau
- Bertha Lee Pate (1902–1975), American blues singer
- Bob Pate (born 1953), American baseball player
- Bobby Pate (born ?), American football player and coach
- Brooks Pate (born ?), American professor of chemistry
- Christine Pomponio-Pate (born 1975), American competitive fitness model and actress
- Danny Pate (born 1979), American bicycle racer
- David Pate (born 1962), American tennis player
- Henry Clay Pate (1833–1864), soldier defeated in Kansas by John Brown
- James Leonard Pate (1935–2003), American oil executive, economist, and author
- Janez Pate (born 1965), Slovenian football player and manager
- Jerry Pate (born 1953), American golfer
- Joe Pate (1892–1948), American baseball player
- John Pate (American football) (born ?), American football coach
- John Pate (councillor), of Virginia
- Johnny Pate (born 1923), American jazz bass guitarist, music arranger, and record producer
- Jonas Pate (born 1970), American screenwriter, director, and producer (twin brother of Josh)
- Josh Pate (born 1970), American screenwriter, director, and producer (twin brother of Jonas)
- Kimberly Pate several people
- Klytie Pate (1912–2010) Australian potter, ceramicist, and artist
- Lloyd Pate (born 1946), American football player
- Louis M. Pate Jr. (1936–2025), American politician
- Martha Lucas Pate (1912–1983), American educator, administrator, philanthropist
- Maurice Pate (1894–1965), American humanitarian and businessman
- Michael Pate (1920–2008), Australian actor, writer, director, and WWII Army veteran
- Miguel Pate (born 1979), American track and field athlete, and Olympic competitor
- Muhammad Ali Pate (born 1968), Nigerian civil servant and public health doctor
- Nick Pate, American professional ten-pin bowler
- Paul Pate (born 1958), American businessman and politician
- Randolph M. Pate (1898–1961), US Marine Commandant
- Richard Pate (1516–1588), English landowner, politician, and founder of Pate's Grammar School
- Richard Pate (burgess), of Virginia
- Richard Pate (bishop) (Pates, Patys, died 1565), English bishop
- Rick Pate (born 1955), American politician
- Robert Pate (1819–1895), British army officer known for his assault of Queen Victoria in 1850
- Rupert Pate (1917–2014), American football player
- Sandy Pate (born 1944), Scottish footballer
- Stephen Pate (born 1964), Australian cyclist and Olympic competitor
- Steve Pate (born 1961), American golfer
- Thomas Pate (burgess) (1636-1703), English merchant, planter, military officer, ferry owner and politician
- Tom Pate (1952–1975), American linebacker for the Canadian Football League
- Walter Pate (1874-1950), American politician

== See also ==
- Pate baronets
