= Pasti =

Pasti may refer to

- Pasti (EP), a mini-album by Malaysian singer Daniel Lee Chee Hun
- Matteo de' Pasti (1420-1467/1468), an Italian sculptor and medalist
- Svetlana Pasti, Russian journalist
- Pastia people, a Native American tribe

== See also ==
- Pasty (disambiguation)
- Pastis (disambiguation)
- Badai Pasti Berlalu (disambiguation)
