= John Pate =

John Pate may refer to:

- John Pate (American football) (born 1954), American football coach
- John Pate (councillor) (1632–1672), planter and politician in Virginia
- John Stewart Pate (1932–2023), plant scientist
- Johnny Pate (born 1923), American former musician
- Sir John Pate, 1st Baronet (died 1659), of the Pate baronets
