= Pate =

Pate, pâté, or paté may refer to:

== Foods ==
=== Pâté 'pastry' ===
- Pâté, various French meat forcemeat pies or loaves
- Pâté haïtien or Haitian patty, a meat-filled puff pastry dish
- Pate or paté (anglicized spellings), the Virgin Islands version of empanadas, a meat or vegetable-filled fried-dough dish

=== Pâte 'dough' ===
- Pate, pâte, or paste, the body of cheese excluding the rind
- Pâte à choux, a kind of choux pastry

== Places ==
- Pate, Cambodia
- Pate Island, also seat of a former Pate Sultanate, in Kenya

== Other ==
- Pate (instrument), a Samoan percussion instrument
- Pate (surname), a surname
- Pâté (film), a film by Agnieszka Wojtowicz-Vosloo
- Patē, the Māori name for the tree Schefflera digitata
- Pate, the surface of the human head, especially a bald head

== See also ==
- Pasty (disambiguation)
