= Jalangkote =

Indonesian traditional dumpling of Makassarese cuisine

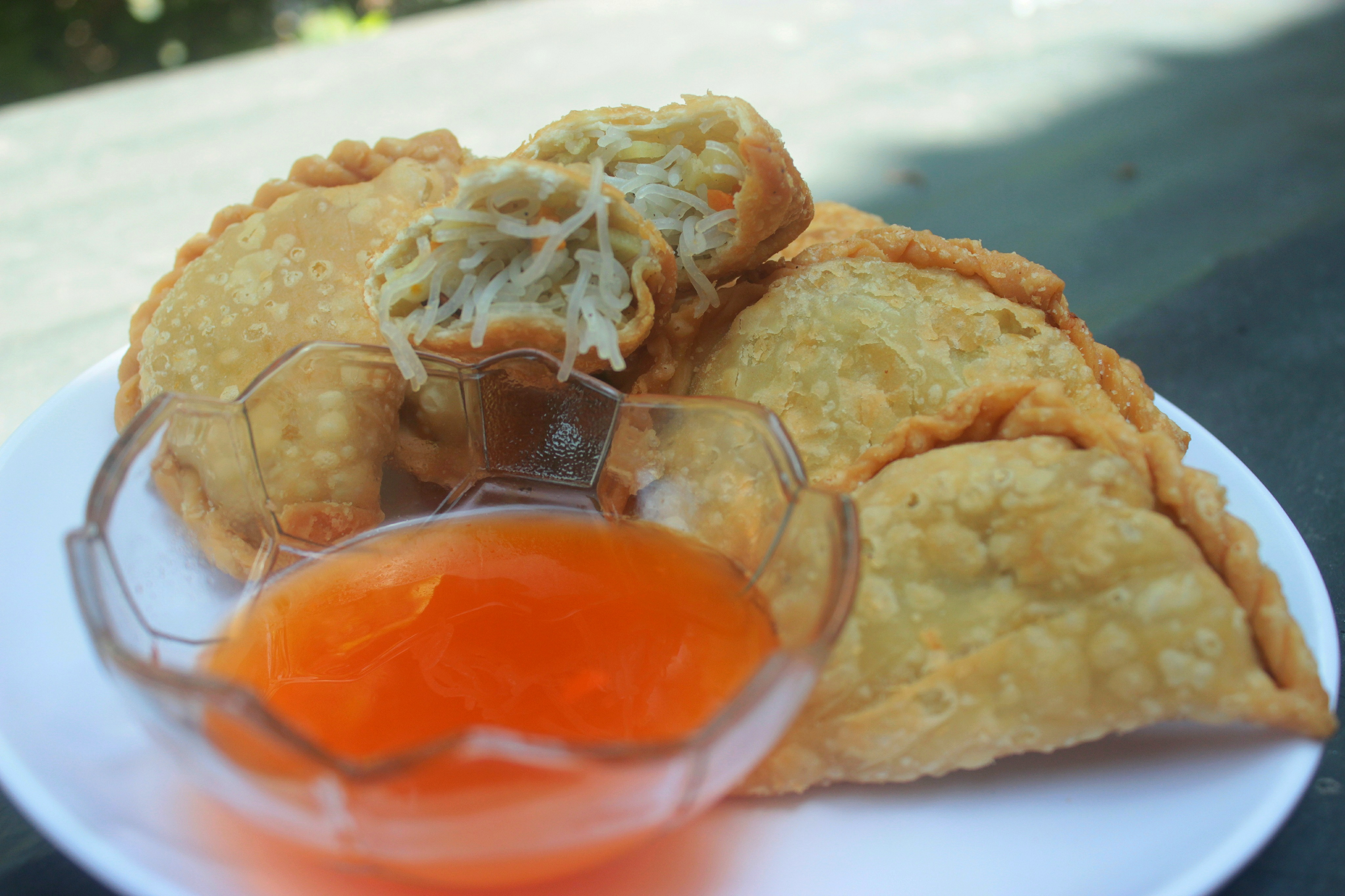
- Type: Dumpling, pastry
- Course: Appetizer, snack
- Place of origin: Indonesia
- Region or state: South Sulawesi
- Associated cuisine: Indonesia
- Created by: Makassarese or Buginese
- Serving temperature: Hot

Jalangkote (Lontara: ᨍᨒᨃᨚᨈᨙ) is a South Sulawesi fried dumpling from Indonesian cuisine, stuffed with rice vermicelli, vegetables, potatoes and eggs. Spicy, sweet and sour sauce will be dipped into prior to be eaten. A popular dish in Makassarese cuisine of the Makassarese and Buginese people, it is also a specialty of South Sulawesi, Indonesia. Jalangkote is similar to dishes such as pastel and panada.

== See also ==
- Kue
- List of Indonesian dishes
- List of Indonesian snacks
