= Pastis (disambiguation) =

Pastis is an anise-flavoured spirit.

Pastis may also refer to:

- Pastis & Buenri, a Spanish production duo and DJs
- Stephan Pastis (born 1968), American cartoonist and former lawyer

== See also ==
- Pasti (disambiguation)
- Pasty (disambiguation)
