= Bánh gối =

Vietnamese dumpling

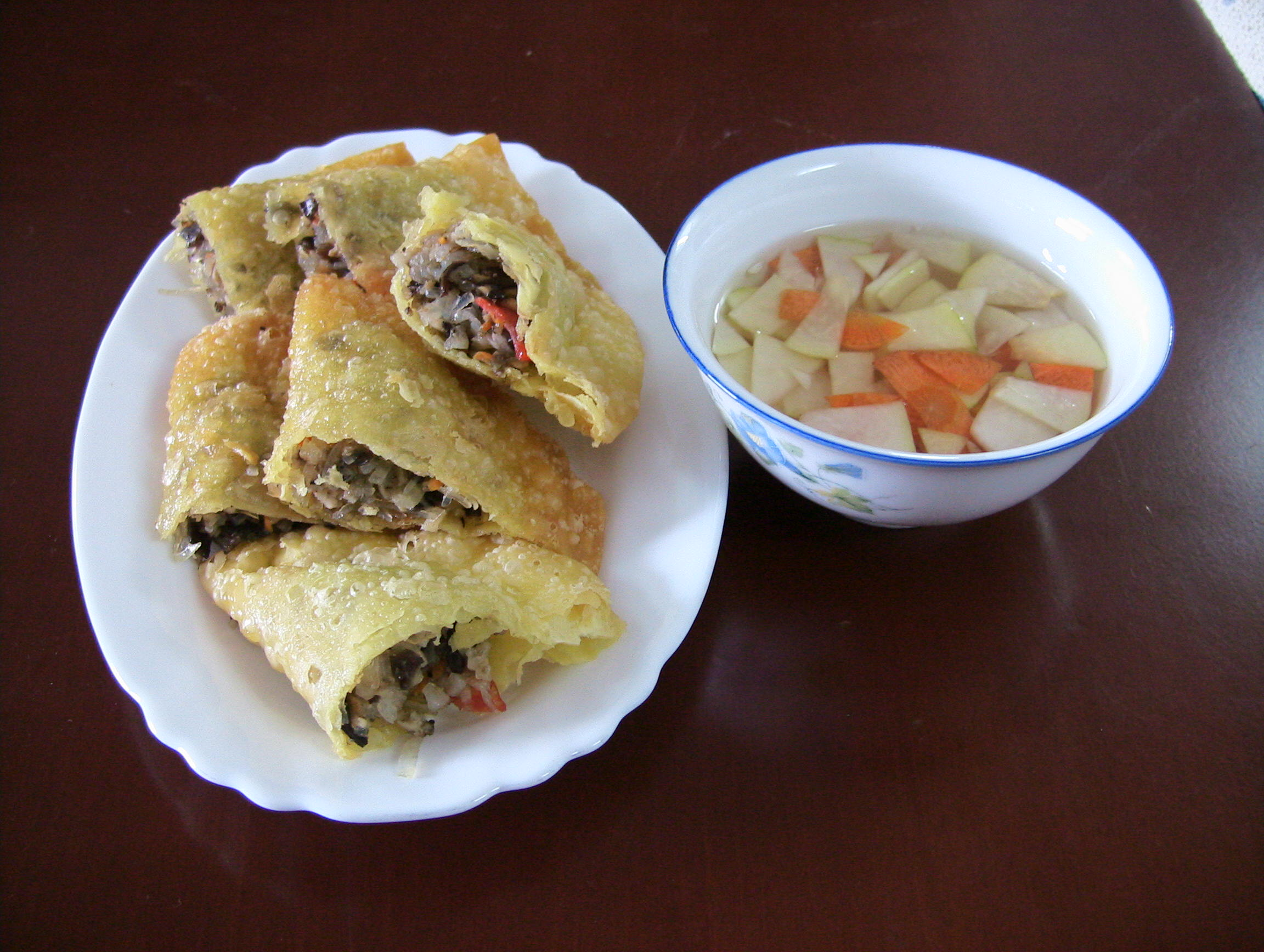
- Alternative names: Bánh quai vạc
- Type: dumpling
- Place of origin: Vietnam

Bánh gối (Vietnamese for 'pillow bánh'), also known as bánh xếp and bánh quai vạc, is a Vietnamese regional dumpling. The dish is a common street food in Vietnam.

The main ingredients of bánh gối are commonly seasoned ground meat, mushrooms, vermicelli, and diced vegetables such as carrots, kohlrabi and jicama (like the ingredients of chả giò); sometimes boiled egg and sliced Chinese sausage are used. These are wrapped into a thinly rolled piece of dough and deep-fried. Bánh gối is also made in pastry form with mung bean, sugar and shredded coconut as filling.

== History ==
Bánh gối is believed to be inspired by the British Cornish pasty or Spanish empanadas and pastel. Portuguese traders and explorers were the first Europeans to enter Asia in the 1500s, building settlements to test the lucrative spice trade in Goa, India, Malacca and Macau. This process has indirectly influenced the cuisine of Asian countries. Similar dishes have been eaten as snacks throughout Asia for a long time. Bánh gối originally from Guangdong yau gok; deep-fried jiaozi was introduced to Vietnam before 1954.
