= Pates =

Pates is a surname. Notable people with the surname include:

- Colin Pates (born 1961), retired English footballer
- Richard Pates (born 1943), American bishop of the Roman Catholic Church

== See also ==
- Barangay Pates
- Pate's Grammar School in Cheltenham, England, UK
- Pates, North Carolina, a community in the United States
- Pate (disambiguation)
- Pâtés
