= Kue pastel =

Indonesian pastry

Indonesian pastel
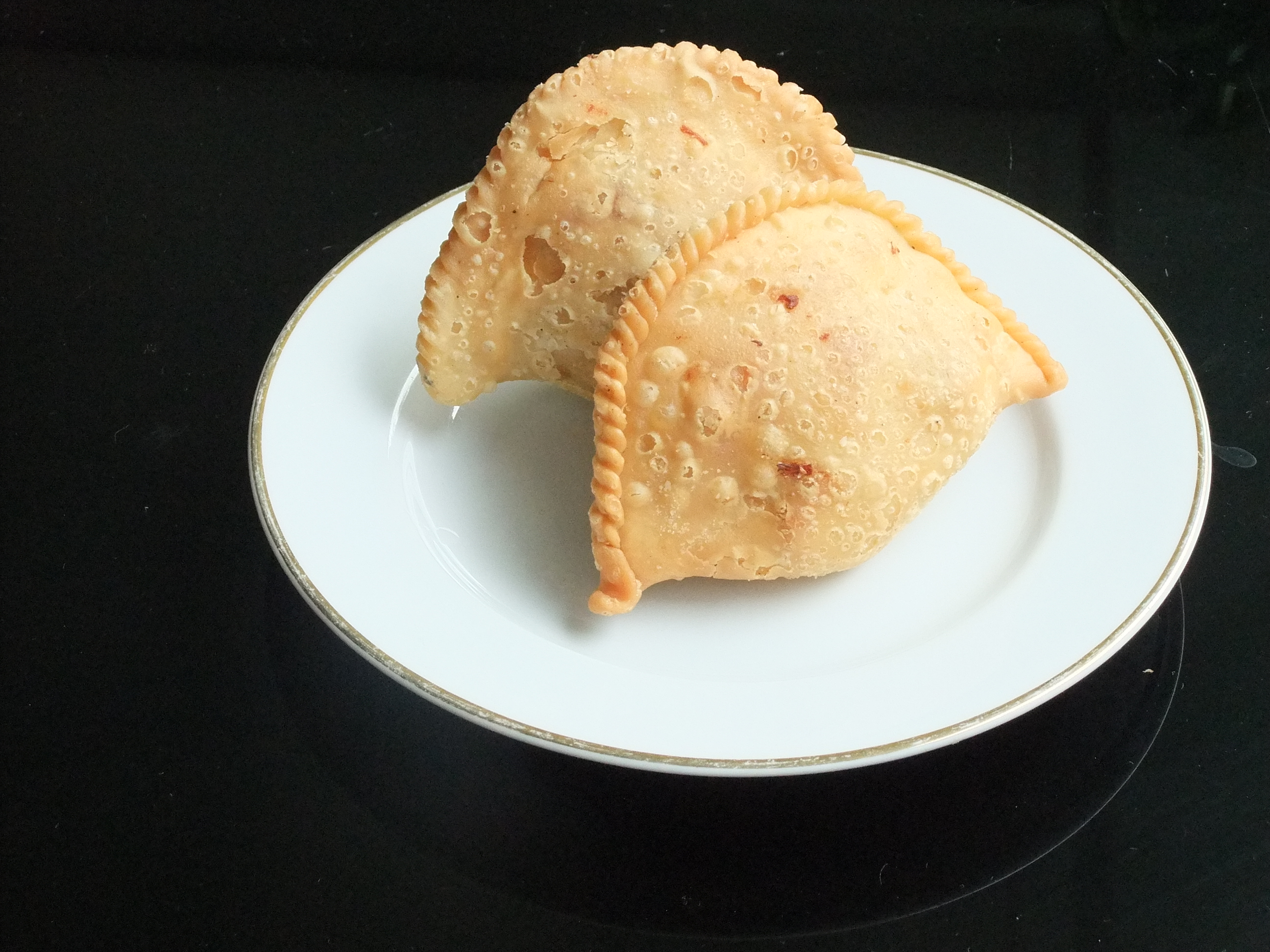
- Indonesian pastel
- Type: Kue
- Course: Snack
- Place of origin: Indonesia
- Serving temperature: Hot or room temperature

In Indonesia, kue pastel is a type of kue (snack food) filled with meat, vegetables, and rice vermicelli deep fried in vegetable oil. It is consumed as a snack and commonly sold in Indonesian traditional markets.

Pastels are derived from the Portuguese influence in Indonesia. It is a type of kue made of thin pastry crust, with a filling of meat (usually chicken or beef), vegetables (potatoes, carrots and bean sprouts), rice vermicelli, and sometimes boiled eggs, then deep fried in vegetable oil. It is consumed as a snack and is commonly sold in Indonesian traditional markets. The snack is very popular during iftar for Ramadan.

The similar Manadonese/North Sulawesi version replaces the thin flour pie crust with bread, and is filled with spicy cakalang (skipjack tuna). This variation of the snack is called panada.

The similar Riau Islands version of pastel is called epok-epok.

== See also ==
- Curry puff
- Empanada
- Pastel
- Jalangkote
