= Curry puff =

Pastry with curry filling

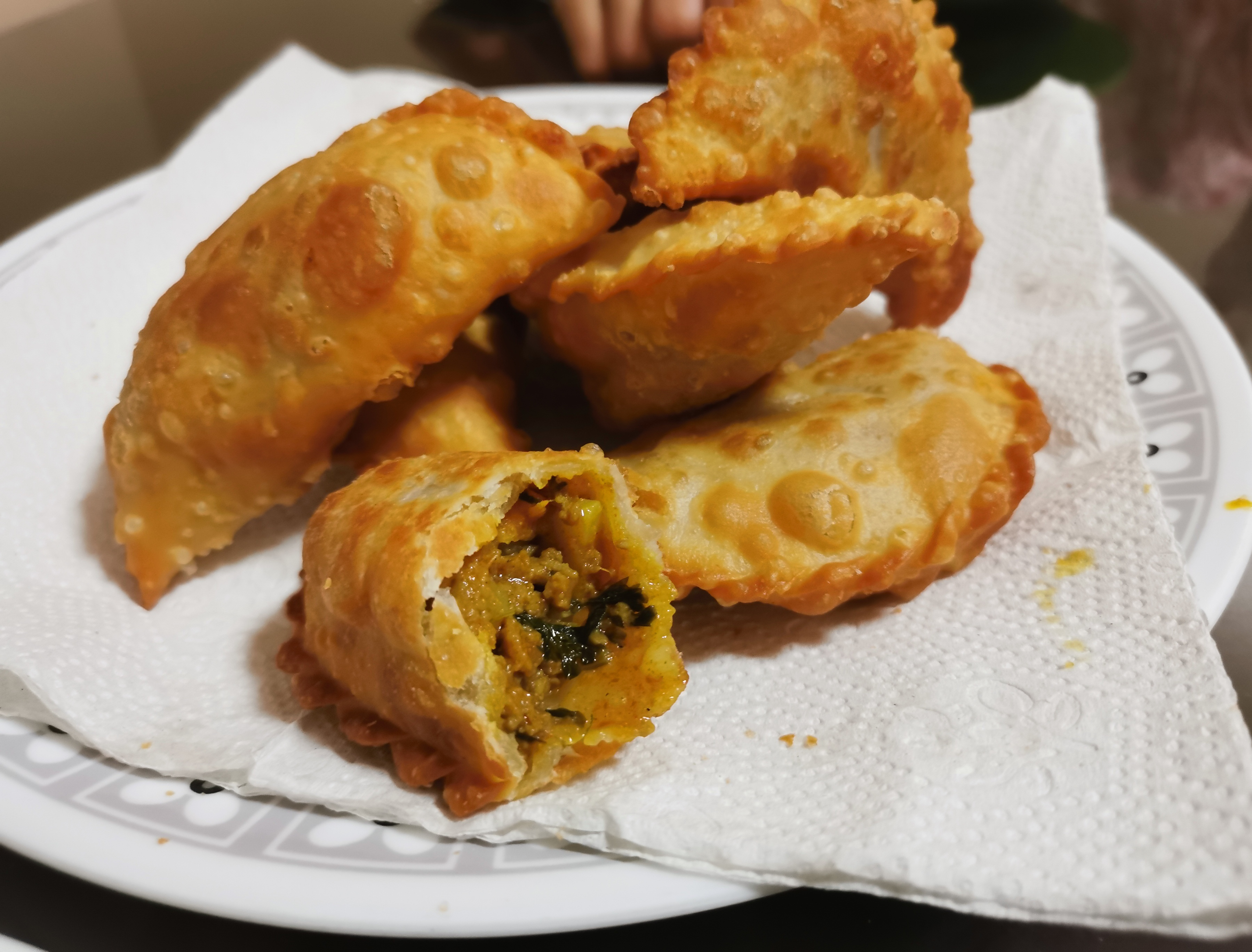
- Curry puff from Malaysia
- Alternative names: Karipap, epok-epok, pastel, veg puff
- Course: Entrée, side dish, snack
- Associated cuisine: Brunei, India, Indonesia, Malaysia, Myanmar, Singapore and Thailand
- Serving temperature: Hot
- Main ingredients: Pastry: wheat flour, water, salt, oil or margarine; Fillings: varies, but usually curry powder or garam masala, and often chicken and potatoes
- Variations: With sardines or tamban

A curry puff (Malay: karipap, epok-epok; Jawi: کاريڤڤ / ايڤوق٢; Chinese: 咖哩角; pinyin: gālí jiǎo; Thai: กะหรี่ปั๊บ, RTGS: karipap, pronounced [kā.rìː.páp]) is a snack of Southeast Asian origin. It is a small turnover containing a filling of curry, often of chicken and potatoes, in a fried or baked pastry shell. The consistency of the curry is quite thick to prevent it from oozing out of the snack. Pap or puff reflects the Fujian Chinese dialect 泡 (pop), which means 'bubble, blister, puffed'. It contains influences from Indian, Malay and Chinese cuisines. Many variations of the snack exist throughout Southeast Asia and India, where it is a popular snack food.

Although its origins are uncertain, the snack is believed to have developed in maritime Southeast Asia due in part to the various influences of the British Cornish pasty, the Portuguese empanada and the South Asian samosa during the colonial era. The curry puff is one of several "puff"-type pastries with different fillings, though now it is by far the most common. Other common varieties include eggs, sardines, root vegetables and onions, or sweet fillings such as yam.

== Regional variations ==
=== India ===
In Indian bakeries, vegetarian curry puffs with fillings like potatoes, carrots and onions are commonly available. They are generally sold as "veg puffs".

=== Indonesia ===
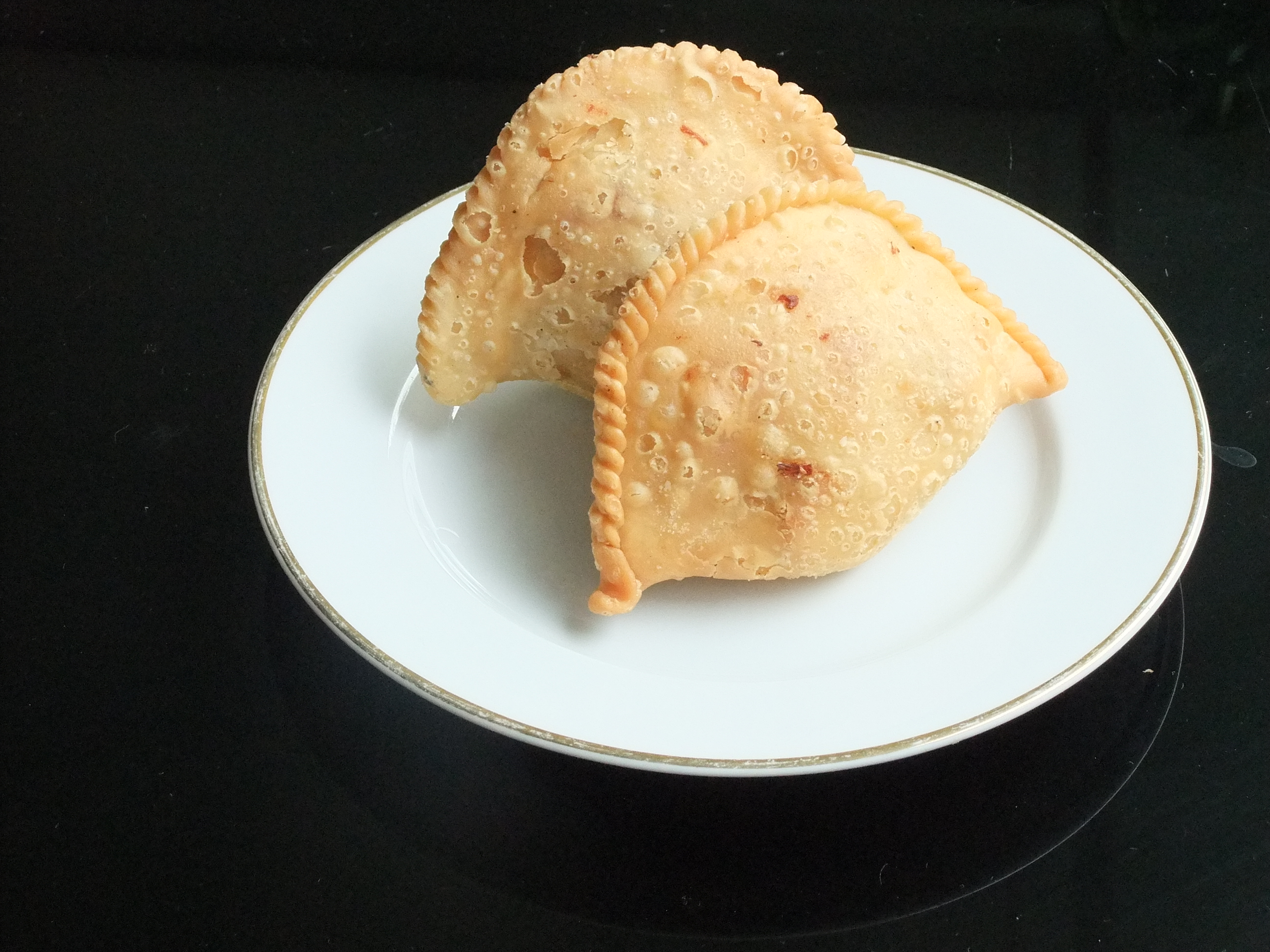
Indonesian pastel with vegetables and beef inside

In Indonesia, a curry puff is known as a pastel, although pastels do not necessarily contain any curry powder.

=== Malaysia ===
In Malaysia, curry puffs are commonly known as karipap and sold freshly fried at many Malay, Chinese and Indian bakeries, bazaars and street food stalls. The curry puffs from Indian bakeries differ from epok-epok in the use of layered pastry that creates a flaky crust.

Other varieties of the epok-epok are filled with half a boiled egg instead of chicken. Another alternative is tinned sardines. There are also vegetarian curry puffs that are not spicy and made from shredded radish, tofu, potatoes and grated carrots. They are often eaten with sweet chili sauce.

=== Myanmar (Burma) ===
The curry puff is a common snack sold in Chinatowns and tea shops throughout Myanmar, where it is known as be tha mont (ဘဲသားမုန့်; lit. 'duck meat pastry'). The traditional filling is duck meat and potato spiced with garam masala, onions, powdered chili peppers, garlic, and ginger.

=== Singapore ===
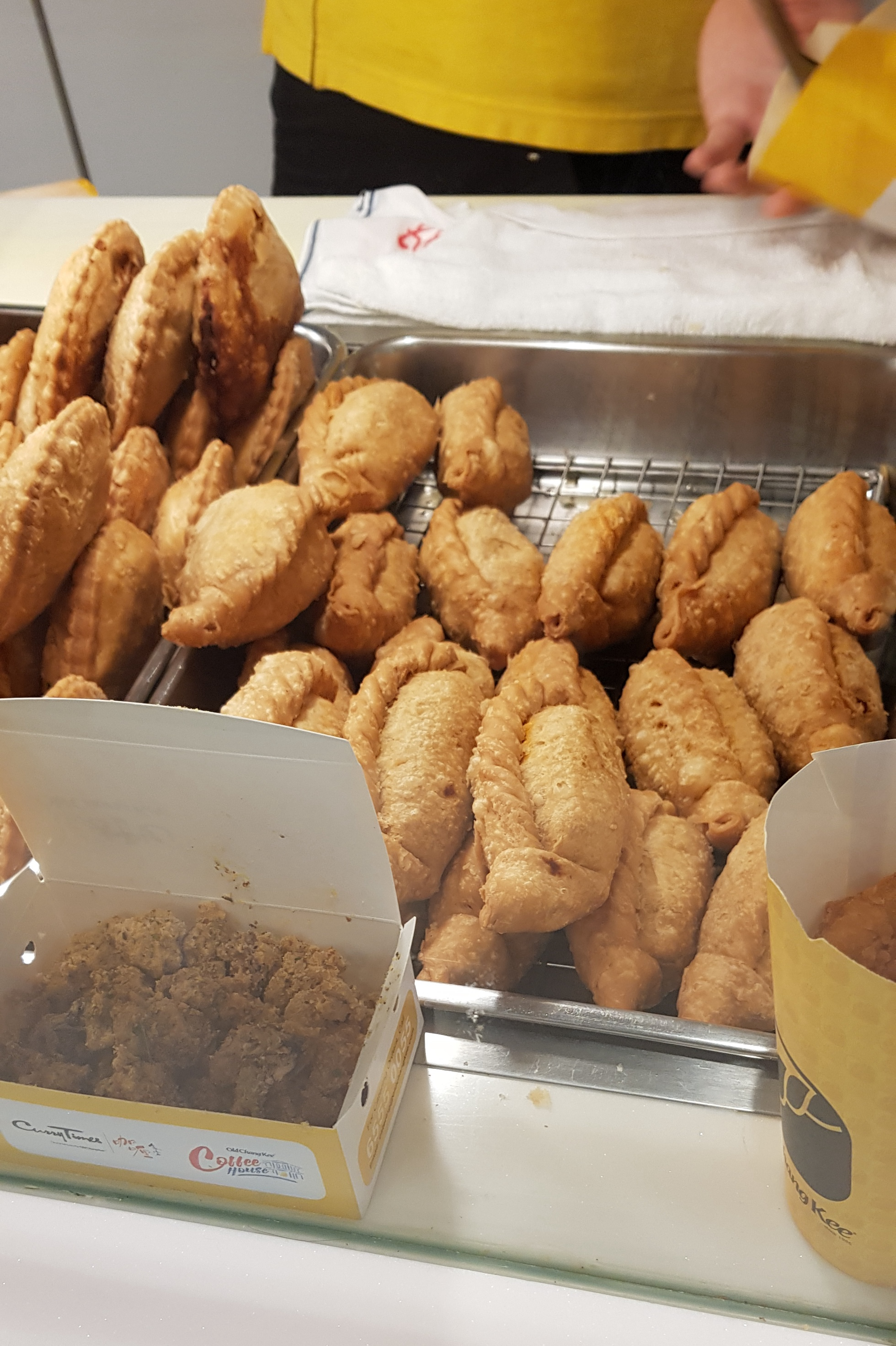
Curry puffs from Old Chang Kee, Singapore

Curry puffs are commonly seen in pasar malams, bakeries and food stalls in shopping centres. Additionally, the aforementioned epok-epok is a popular variation in some of Singapore's hawker centres, usually amongst Malay stalls. Alternatively, the more common type of curry puff has a thick or flaky English-style crust, with a mixture of Chinese and Indian styles in the filling.

They may also be categorised into hand-made or mass-produced, machine-made puffs in triangular shape or a half wrapped circular shape. Both variations are popular in Singapore. Curry puff variations are usually denoted by coloured dye markings on the side of the puffs.

Other puff snacks modelled on the curry puff concept have also been introduced, for example puffs with yam, durian, corn, red bean, nata de coco, grass jelly, bird's nest and even custard fillings.

Besides the more uncommon fillings mentioned, there are also more conventional flavours which are popular with locals. These puffs are readily available in Singapore, which include sardine, black-pepper chicken and tuna fillings.

In Singapore, Old Chang Kee has been selling curry puffs for over 60 years and now has outlets all over Singapore, Malaysia, Indonesia, Australia and the United Kingdom.

=== Thailand ===
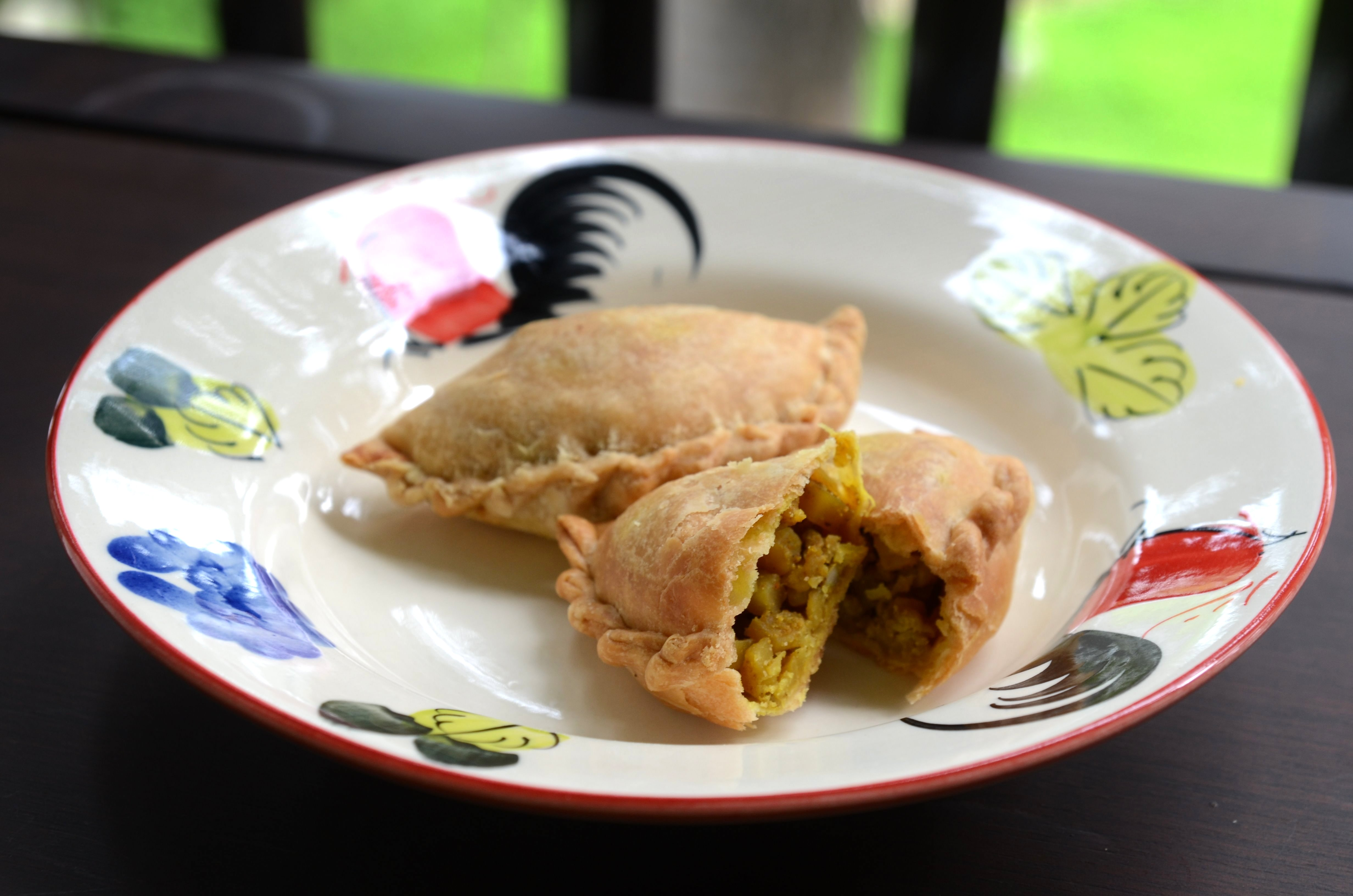
Thai karipap normally only contains chicken, potato, onion, and curry powder

In Thailand, a curry puff is known as a karipap (กะหรี่ปั๊บ). Assumed to have been adapted from the Portuguese pastel, it arrived in Thailand during the Ayutthaya period in the reign of King Narai (1633–1688) from Portuguese-Japanese-Bengali cook Maria Guyomar de Pinha, along with many Thai desserts such as thong yip, thong yot, foi thong and luk chup. Notable areas where karipap is popular are Amphoe Muak Lek, and Saraburi province in central Thailand, where durian filling is used.

== Common ingredients ==
- Curry powder
- Potatoes
- A small piece of hard-boiled egg
- Meat, usually beef or chicken
- Onions
- Puff pastry
- Cream cheese, used mainly in Americanized variations of the food
- Sardines

== See also ==
- Bridie
- Curry bread
- Curry beef turnover
- Aloo pie
- List of stuffed dishes
- Pasty
