= Richard Pate (burgess) =

Politician of The Colony of Virginia

Member of the House of Burgesses for Gloucester County
- In office 1653
- Preceded by: Hugh Gwinne
- Succeeded by: Thomas Breman

Personal details
- Born: England
- Died: 1657; Gloucester County, Colony of Virginia
- Resting place: unknown
- Relatives: John Pate (nephew), Thomas Pate (cousin)

Richard Pate (d.1657) was a planter and politician who served a term as burgess representing Gloucester County in the House of Burgesses.

== Early and family life ==
His relationship with Sir John Pate (first and last) baronet of Sisonby in Leicestershire (1593-1659) is unclear, although clearly they are related, and the Thomas Pate who ultimately succeeded to this man's lands was the Baron's youngest son and emigrated to Virginia circa 1672. This older Pate emigrated to the Virginia colony before the beginning of the English Civil Wars, perhaps in 1636.

== Career ==
In November 1650, near the start of Virginia's tobacco boom, Pate and another man patented 1,141 aces on the north side of the York River at the head of the eastern branch of Poropotank Creek. He had an occasional business relationship with Richard Newport of Accomack County on the other side of Chesapeake Bay. Gloucester County voters elected Pate and Abraham Iverson as their representatives to the House of Burgesses in 1653, changing both members from the previous term, and in 1654 elected two different men.

== Death and legacy ==
In October 30, 1657, his last will and testament was admitted to probate in Virginia. The Leicester-born son of his brother Timothy, John Pate (1632-1672; who would be appointed to the Virginia Governor's Council in 1670) qualified as administrator of this man's estate.
