= Agnieszka Wojtowicz-Vosloo =

Polish-American filmmaker and writer (born 1975)

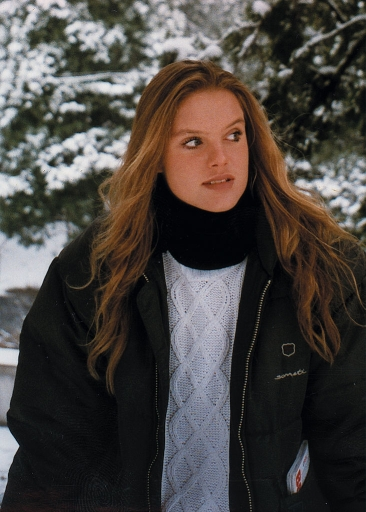
- Born: 1975 (age 50–51); Warsaw, Poland
- Education: Tisch School of the Arts
- Occupations: Filmmaker; writer

Agnieszka Wojtowicz-Vosloo (born 1975) is a Polish-American filmmaker and writer.

== Biography ==
She studied film at Tisch School of the Arts where she graduated summa cum laude in 2003. Her debut short film Pâté premiered at the Sundance Film Festival and went on to win several prestigious awards including NYU's Wasserman Award, the Fielle d'Or at the Beverly Hills Film Festival, the Grand Jury Prize at the WorldFest Houston International Film Festival, New York Magazine's Award of Excellence and the Special Jury Prize at the Atlanta Film Festival.

Filmmaker Magazine named Wojtowicz-Vosloo as one of the 25 New Faces of Independent Film.

In 2004 she collaborated with Laurie Anderson on the acclaimed O Zlozony/O Composite, a multi-media project for the Paris Opera Ballet with choreography by Trisha Brown, based on Czeslaw Milosz's poem "O Zlozony". The piece premiered at the Opera Garnier in Paris in December 2004.

Agnieszka Wojtowicz-Vosloo's first feature film After.Life, a psychological horror thriller starring Liam Neeson, Christina Ricci and Justin Long, premiered at the AFI Film Festival in Los Angeles on 7 November 2009. Anchor Bay Entertainment, a division of Overture Films, acquired theatrical rights for the U.S. and the U.K., and released the film in theaters on 9 April 2010. The DVD and Blu-ray were released in the US on 3 August 2010.

Wojtowicz-Vosloo garnered extensive media attention after the release of After.Life. Ronnie Scheib from Variety called the film "an elegant exercise in horror", while the National Board of Review commented "Wojtowitcz-Vosloo masterfully manipulates the conventions of horror and thriller genres with an exceptionally assured sense of style and storytelling". Noted film reviewer James Berardinelli added "I admire filmmakers who take chances and defy expectations. The echoes of 'After.Life' linger in the memory long after the impressions of countless safe cookie cutter productions have faded". Manohla Dargis' review in The New York Times however was mixed, "Ms. Wojtowicz-Vosloo seems to have spent too much time trying to make an art-house chiller instead of an effective film." Review aggregate Rotten Tomatoes reports that 29% of 49 critics have given the film a positive review, holding an average score of 4.6/10. According to the website, the film's critical consensus is, "It has an interesting premise and admirable ambitions, but After.Life fails to deliver enough twists or thrills to sustain its creepy atmosphere." Review aggregate Metacritic has given the film a weighted score of 36/100, based on 21 reviews, indicating "Generally unfavorable reviews".

In The Wall Street Journal profile "Death Becomes Her" by Matthew Kaminski, Liam Neeson said Wojtowicz-Vosloo "reminds me a little of Kathryn Bigelow," the Oscar-winning director of The Hurt Locker. In July 2010 the filmmaker was featured in Elle magazine and on the cover of Gazeta Wyborcza, Polish newspaper.
