= Old Chang Kee =

Singaporean food and beverage chain

Old Chang Kee Ltd. 老曾記
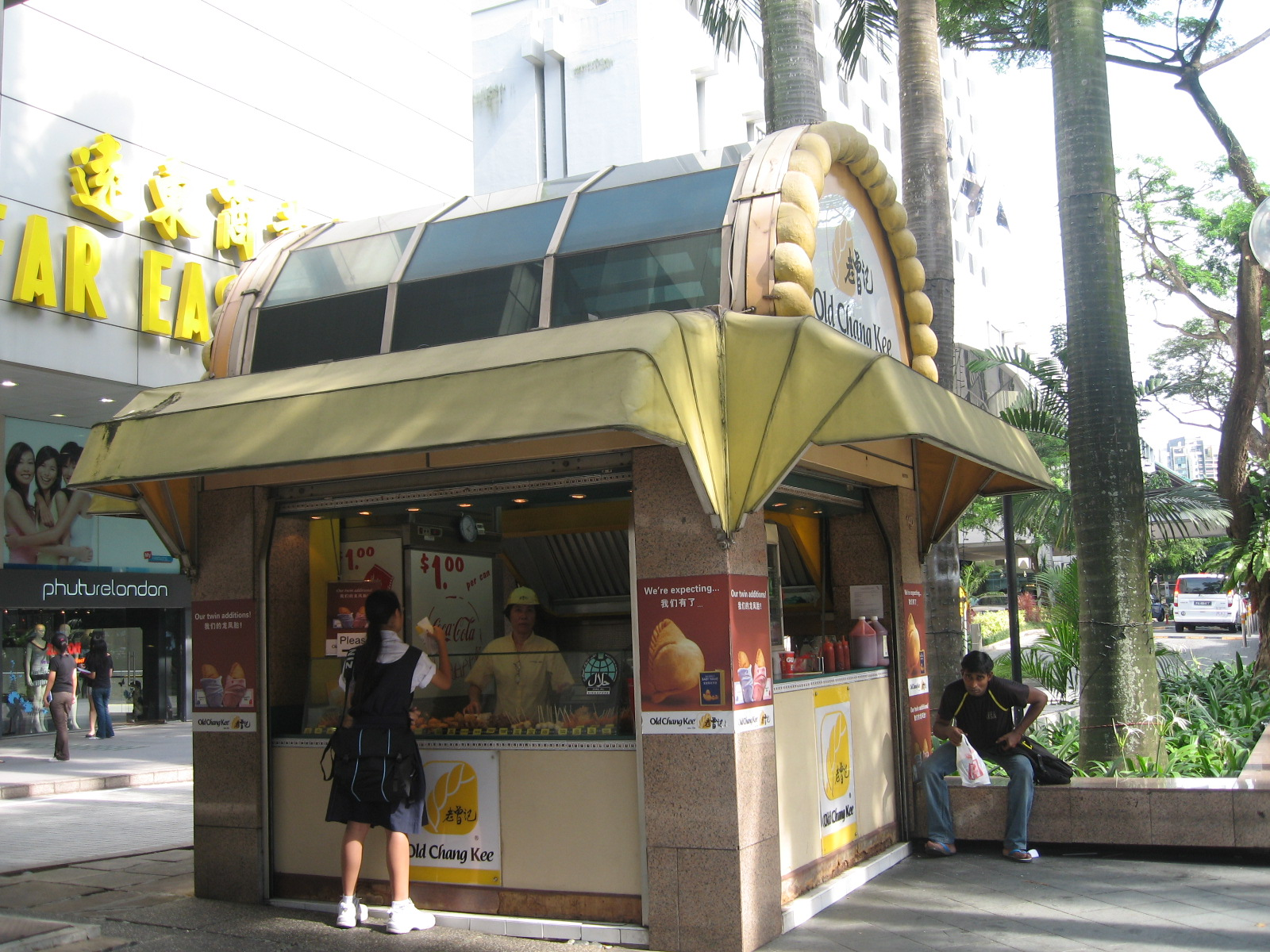
- An Old Chang Kee stall at Far East Plaza, Singapore.
- Type: Public
- Traded as: SGX: 5ML
- Industry: Food and Beverage
- Founded: Singapore (1956; 70 years ago)
- Headquarters: Singapore
- Number of locations: 110+ (2017)
- Key people: Han Keen Juan, Chairman
- Products: Snacks of Singaporean cuisine
- Website: oldchangkee.com

Old Chang Kee Ltd. is a Singaporean multinational snack, food and beverage chain specialising in curry puffs and other local snacks. Headquartered in Woodlands, it is listed on the Singapore Exchange.

== History ==
Old Chang Kee began as a stall outside Rex Cinema at MacKenzie Road. It was acquired by Han Keen Juan in 1986. The company started the process to become halal in 2004. Following the completion of their documentation, the Halal certification application was submitted in late October 2004. Old Chang Kee products, outlets, and 2 central kitchens were officially certified Halal by MUIS on 7 January 2005. The company's main production facility is located at Woodlands Terrace.

Old Chang Kee was one of six winners of the SPBA Distinctive Brand Awards 2005 and also a recipient of the Singapore Brand Award Heritage Award in 2005.

As of 2014, there were 80 outlets in Singapore, with additional locations in Australia (one), Indonesia (twenty), Malaysia (two), and the United Kingdom (two).

The company was incorporated in Singapore on 16 December 2004 as a private limited company named Old Chang Kee Singapore Pte Ltd. On 22 November 2007, the company changed its name to Old Chang Kee Ltd. upon converting into a public limited company. It was listed on the Catalist-NS board on 16 January 2008.

== Products ==
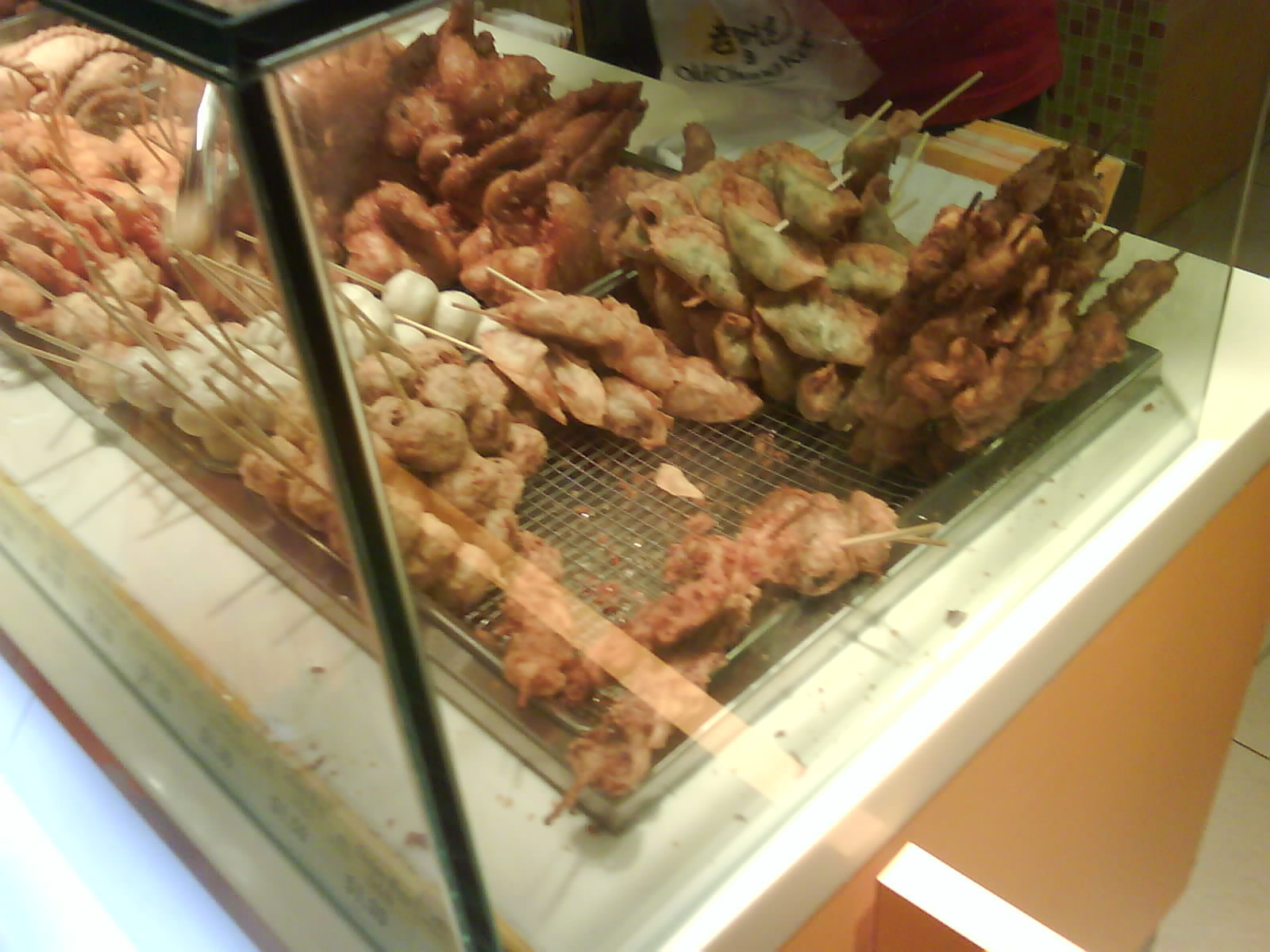
Some of the products of Old Chang Kee

Old Chang Kee is known for its curry puffs and has introduced various other types of curry puffs and snacks. In 2008, the products underwent rebranding, with its curry puffs renamed as Curry'O.

In addition to curry and sardine puffs, the company offers a variety of other snacks and finger foods, including spring rolls, yam cakes, carrot cakes, fishballs, gyoza, fried cuttlefish, breaded prawns, chicken nuggets, and fried fish fillets.

In 2026, Old Chang Kee collaborated with McDonald's during the period of National Day, providing curry-related items at McDonald's.
