= After.Life =

- Theatrical release poster
- Directed by: Agnieszka Wójtowicz-Vosloo
- Written by: Agnieszka Wojtowicz-Vosloo; Paul Vosloo; Jakub Korolczuk
- Produced by: Bill Perkins; Brad Michael Gilbert; Celine Rattray
- Starring: Christina Ricci; Liam Neeson; Justin Long
- Cinematography: Anastas N. Michos
- Edited by: Niven Howie
- Music by: Paul Haslinger
- Production companies: Lleju Productions; Harbor Light Entertainment; Plum Pictures
- Distributed by: Anchor Bay Entertainment
- Release date: November 7, 2009
- Running time: 104 minutes
- Country: United States
- Language: English
- Box office: $2 million

After.Life is a 2009 American psychological horror-thriller film directed by Agnieszka Wójtowicz-Vosloo from her original screenplay. It stars Liam Neeson, Christina Ricci, and Justin Long.

== Plot ==
Eliot Deacon owns a funeral home and talks softly to the corpses he prepares for burial. Middle school teacher Anna Taylor meets Eliot when she attends the funeral of her piano teacher. That night Anna argues with her boyfriend Paul at a restaurant. She drives off in a state of distress and has a traffic accident. She awakens on an embalming table in the funeral home to find the funeral director, Eliot, cutting off her clothes and telling her she has died. He tells Anna that he has a gift and that he can hear the dead. Eliot has a collection of photographs of corpses whom he has helped "make the transition". Eliot injects Anna with a fictional drug called hydronium bromide to "relax the muscles and keep rigor mortis from setting in."

Paul asks to see Anna's body but Eliot does not allow it on the grounds he is not family. Anna unsuccessfully attempts to escape several times. Eliot tells her she must let go of life as she had not really been living anyway. Eventually, Anna escapes and finds a room with a phone where she reaches Paul, who hangs up thinking it's a prank. Anna comes to believe she has actually died when Eliot lets her see her corpse-like self in a mirror. One of Anna's students sees her and alerts Paul, who begins to suspect she is still alive.

Paul goes to the police station, wanting a search warrant from the police chief, Tom, but is denied. While there, Paul tells the police his belief that Anna is still alive. One of the policemen says a drug called hydronium bromide (the same drug Eliot used on Anna) can be used to fake a death by causing paralysis and a very slow heartbeat.

Anna's student Jack visits the funeral home and Eliot tells him that they share a gift, the same as Jesus, who raised Lazarus, and he offers to teach the boy more. Jack accepts and is later seen burying a living chick in a box.

During the final preparation for Anna's funeral, she asks to see herself one last time. Eliot holds up a small mirror, and while she stares at herself she notices her breath condensing on the glass and accuses him of having lied about her being dead. He injects her one last time and she falls unconscious. At the funeral, Paul places on her finger the engagement ring he intended to give her the night of the crash.

After the funeral, Paul drinks heavily and behaves aggressively with Eliot, who seems to taunt him and encourage him to see for himself that Anna is really dead, telling him there is not much time. Meanwhile, Anna is shown awakening to the sound of earth being shoveled onto her casket. She cries out and desperately scratches the satin lining of the lid.

Driving under the influence of alcohol, Paul rushes to the cemetery. He and Anna embrace and she tells him that she has always loved him. Paul asks about an odd sound he hears, and Anna explains it is the sound of Eliot's gloves and scissors on the table as he prepares Paul's body. A moment later, he finds himself in the funeral home with Eliot standing over him, preparing his body as he did Anna's. Eliot says that Paul never made it to the cemetery due to a car accident, which killed him. Paul protests that he is alive until Eliot inserts an embalming trocar deep into his torso.

== Cast ==
- Christina Ricci as Anna Taylor
- Liam Neeson as Eliot Deacon
- Justin Long as Paul Coleman
- Josh Charles as Tom Peterson
- Celia Weston as Beatrice Taylor
- Chandler Canterbury as Jack
- Rosemary Murphy as Mrs. Whitehall
- Shuler Hensley as Vincent Miller
- Malachy McCourt as Father Graham
- Alice Drummond as Mrs. Hutton

== Casting ==
Wójtowicz-Vosloo envisioned Naomi Watts to play female lead but for unknown reasons, casting the actress did not happen. Conversely, Liam Neeson reportedly accepted the part right after reading the script.

== Production ==
After.Life completed filming in New York at the end of December 2008 with Bill Perkins and Celine Rattray as producers. Galt Niederhoffer and Pam Hirsch are executive producing for Plum Pictures with Edwin Marshall and James Swisher executive producing for Harbor Light. Scenes were filmed in Lynbrook, New York in early December 2008.

== Release ==
After.Life premiered at the AFI Film Festival in Los Angeles on November 7, 2009. Anchor Bay Entertainment, a division of Overture Films, has acquired theatrical rights for the U.S. and the U.K. The film received an R-rating for the multiple nude scenes with Christina Ricci and was released on 9 April 2010 in a limited release. Anchor Bay released the DVD and Blu-ray on 3 August 2010.

== Critical reception ==
After.Life was not well received by critics. Review aggregate Rotten Tomatoes reports that 24% of 55 critics have given the film a positive review, holding an average score of 4.5/10. According to the website, the film's critical consensus is, "It has an interesting premise and admirable ambitions, but After.Life fails to deliver enough twists or thrills to sustain its creepy atmosphere." Review aggregate Metacritic has given the film a weighted score of 36/100 based on 21 reviews, indicating "generally unfavorable" reviews. Dread Central rated the film 2.5/5 stars and called it "a competent but disappointing thriller." Bloody Disgusting rated it 3/5 stars and described it as "a plodding reflection on mortality disguised as a psychological thriller". In a negative review for The New York Times, Manohla Dargis wrote that "the few good ideas are inevitably thwarted by the filmmaking". James Berardinelli rated the film 3/4. Berardinelli wrote that the film "has flaws aplenty" but it is arresting and unsettling.
