= Kimberly Pate =

Kimberly Pate may refer to:

- Kim Pate, executive director of the Canadian Association of Elizabeth Fry Societies and Member of the Order of Canada
- K. Michelle, American R&B singer and songwriter
