= Badai Pasti Berlalu =

Badai Pasti Berlalu may refer to:

- Badai Pasti Berlalu (novel), a novel by Indonesian author Marga T
- Badai Pasti Berlalu (film), a film by Indonesian director Teguh Karya
- Badai Pasti Berlalu (album), soundtrack album of the film
- "Badai Pasti Berlalu" (song), title song of the film
