= Svetlana Pasti =

Russian-Finnish media researcher

- Born: Soviet Union
- Citizenship: Finland
- Education: Leningrad State University
- Scientific career
- Workplaces: Murmansk State Broadcasting Service (editor-in-chief, Severomorsk Radio, 1.8.1983–1.10.1996) → Academy of Finland → University of Tampere
- Academic advisors: Kaarle Nordenstreng

Svetlana Mikhailovna Pasti (Russian: Светлана Михайловна Пасти, until 2003: Juskevits Russian: Юшкевич) is a senior researcher at the Centre for Journalism, Media and Communication at the University of Tampere. She has been serving as a docent in journalism since 2013. Pasti specialises in Russian media, generations in journalism, and professional culture of journalists. She obtained a licentiate's degree and then a Ph.D. from the University of Tampere in 2002 and 2007, respectively. For her doctorate, she performed research in the changing profession of the journalist in Russia. Pasti is of Russian origin.
