= Pâté (film) =

2001 American film by Agnieszka Wojtowicz-Vosloo

- Directed by: Agnieszka Wojtowicz-Vosloo
- Written by: Eva Han; Agnieszka Wojtowicz-Vosloo
- Produced by: Fountainhead Films
- Cinematography: Shawn Kim
- Edited by: Margo Hyde; Paul Vosloo
- Music by: Jose Halac
- Release date: January 2001 (Sundance)
- Running time: 30 minutes
- Country: United States
- Language: English

Pâté is a short film by Agnieszka Wojtowicz-Vosloo. The film premiered at the Sundance Film Festival and went on to win several prestigious awards including NYU's Wasserman Award, the Fielle d'Or at the Beverly Hills Film Festival, The Grand Jury Prize at the WorldFest Houston International Film Festival, Award for Excellence from New York Magazine and the Special Jury Prize at the Atlanta Film Festival.

== Cast ==
- Jane Culley as the Mother
- Ty Arnold as Otto
- Samantha Browne-Walters as Vera
- Gary Swanson as Mr. Griswald
- Barbara Pitcher as the Maid
