= Thomas Pate =

Merchant and politician of The Colony of Virginia

Member of the House of Burgesses for Gloucester County
- In office 1684 Serving with Henry Whiting
- Preceded by: John Buckner
- Succeeded by: John Armistead

Personal details
- Born: Leicester, England
- Died: Yorktown, York County, Colony of Virginia
- Resting place: unknown
- Relatives: John Pate (uncle), Richard Pate (great-uncle)

Thomas Pate (1636 – October 1703) was an English merchant who became a planter, military officer, ferry owner and politician who served a term as burgess representing Gloucester County in the House of Burgesses. Rebel Nathaniel Bacon commandeered this man's house in Gloucester County during Bacon's Rebellion (and died there), and later Governor Howard also lived there. Across Mobjack Bay, the restored historic Yorktown home once named after this man is now renamed the "Cole Digges" house after a politically powerful successor owner and resident since recent archeological research indicates it was probably built decades after this man's death.

== Early and family life ==
He was one of the younger sons of Sir John Pate (first and last) Baronet of Sisonby in Leicestershire, England (1593–1659). This man received an education in England before emigrating to the Virginia colony circa 1672, where he ultimately inherited land patented by his relative Richard Pate and expanded by his uncle John Pate.

== Career ==
By 1672, Thomas Pate was a merchant whose Virginia inventory included many items. On October 26, 1676, rebel Nathaniel Bacon, who had commandeered this man's house in Gloucester, Virginia, died.

In October 1678 this man patented another 200 acres nearby, and in 1679 purchased a plantation in Old Rappahannock COunty. He initiated lawsuits in Middlesex County in 1678 and 1682.

He also served as an officer of the Gloucester County militia, rising from the rank of Major to Colonel.

Gloucester County voters elected Pate and veteran Henry Whiting as their representatives to the House of Burgesses in 1684, but re-elected neither in 1685. In 1686, Pate replaced Philip Ludwell as customs officer, a lucrative position.

Pate also came to operate a ferry, with the other terminus in Yorktown, a town founded during the last decade of the century. In 1699, Pate bought a Yorktown town lot, and was required to improve it by constructing a building within a year.

== Death and legacy ==
Thomas Pate died in Yorktown in October 1703, where he owned both a tavern and the ferry. According to his will, his son John Pate inherited 1000 acres of land in Gloucester County, and an equivalent amount in King and Queen County. Thomas Pate bequeathed his Yorktown house to his caregiver, Joanne Lawson, and a decade later the lot (and presumably the house) was acquired by Cole Digges, a politically powerful planter and merchant who served in both houses of Virginia's legislature. The house currently on the lot Pate purchased was placed on the National Register of Historic Places, and survived the Battle of Yorktown during the American Revolutionary War, as well as a fire that devastated Yorktown in 1814. Until 2003, it was known as the "Thomas Pate house", but is currently known as the "Cole Digges house" after further archeological research showed it was probably built in the 1730s after this man's death (and renovated several times since). The building is currently owned by the National Park Service, but operated as a cafe by Mobjack Bay Coffee Roasters.
