= Yau gok =

Cantonese-style pastry snack

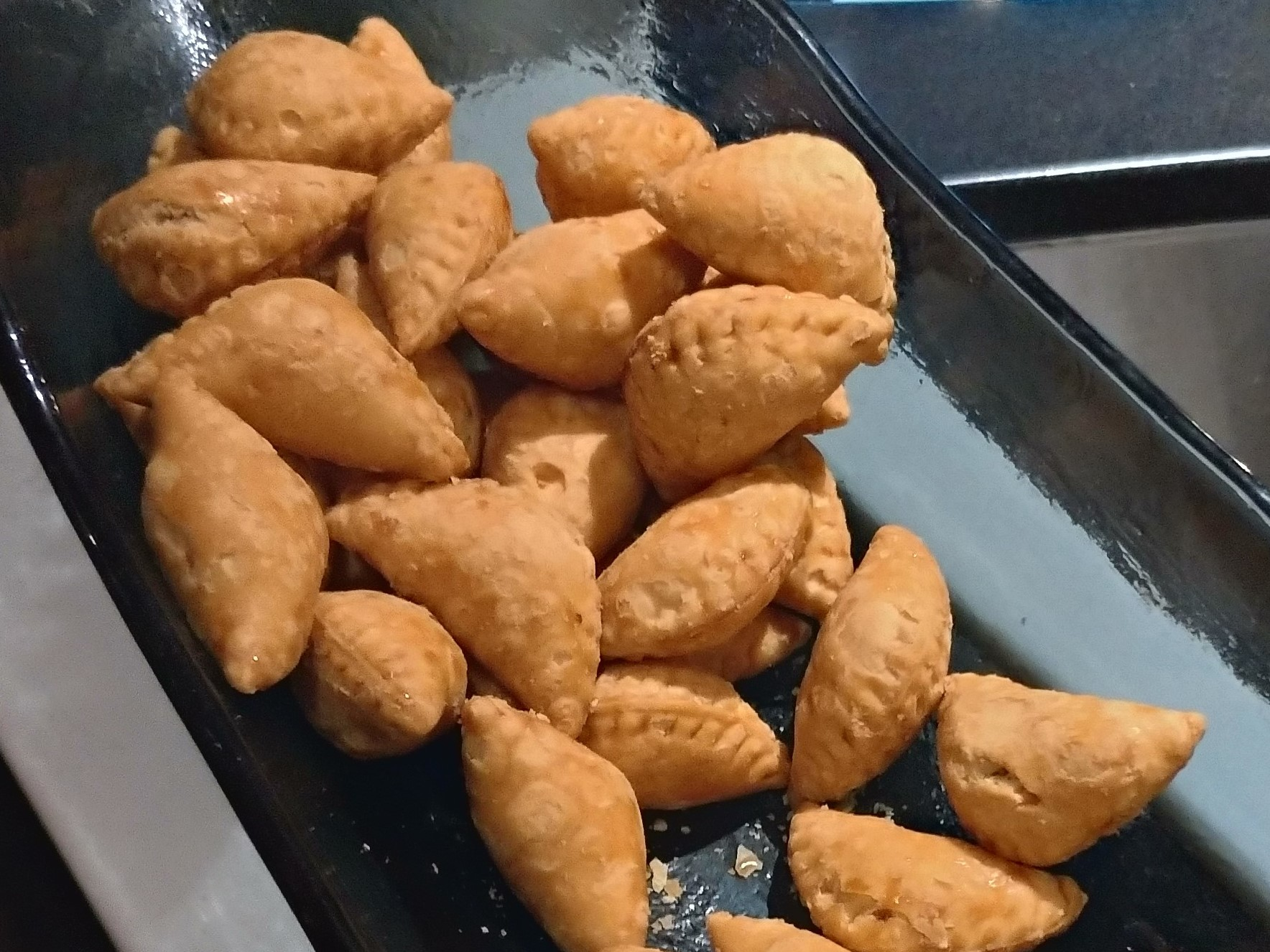
- Alternative names: Gok zai (角仔)
- Course: Chinese New Year dish
- Place of origin: China
- Region or state: Guangdong, Hong Kong and Cantonese-speaking areas
- Main ingredients: Dough from glutinous rice, various meat fillings

Yau gok
- Chinese: 油角
- Literal meaning: oil dumpling
Transcriptions
Standard Mandarin
- Hanyu Pinyin: yóu jiǎo
Hakka
- Romanization: yiu gok
Yue: Cantonese
- Yale Romanization: yàuh gok
- Jyutping: jau4 gok3

Alternative Chinese name
- Chinese: 角仔
- Literal meaning: small dumpling
Transcriptions
Standard Mandarin
- Hanyu Pinyin: jiǎo zǎi
Hakka
- Romanization: gok zai
Yue: Cantonese
- Yale Romanization: gok jái
- Jyutping: gok3 zai2

Yau gok (油角) or jau gok (油角) is a traditional pastry found in Cantonese cuisine, originating from Guangdong Province in China. The term gok (角) reflects the crescent shape of the pastries; they differ from the connotation of steamed or pan-fried Chinese dumplings, normally associated with the phonetically similar term jiaozi (餃仔). They are most commonly prepared during Chinese New Year, and consumed in Cantonese-speaking regions and communities, including Hong Kong and Malaysia.

== Preparation ==
The pastry wrap is first made of glutinous rice dough. A crescent shape is formed to hold the fried ingredients used as filling. A batch of the pastries are either baked or deep-fried in a wok.

=== Salty version ===
The savory version is generally called haam gok zai (simplified Chinese: 咸角仔; traditional Chinese: 鹹角仔; pinyin: xián jiǎo zǐ; Jyutping: haam^{4} gok^{3} zai^{2}). There is a range of popular fillings that vary depending on regional culture. Common ingredients include pork, Chinese sausages, and Chinese black mushroom.

=== Sweet version ===
The sweet version is generally called tim gok zai (Chinese: 甜角仔; pinyin: tián jiǎo zǐ; Jyutping: tim^{4} gok^{3} zai^{2}). The standard filling comprises ground peanuts, white sesame seeds, and desiccated (dried) coconut crumbs mixed with sugar. After the frying, this version is crunchy. This version is suitable for vegetarians.

== See also ==
- Empanada
- Jiaozi
- Jian dui
- List of deep fried foods
