= John Pate (councillor) =

Politician of The Colony of Virginia

Member of the Virginia Governor's Council
- In office 1670-1672

Personal details
- Born: 1632 Leicester, England
- Died: 1672 (aged 39–40) Gloucester County, Colony of Virginia
- Resting place: unknown
- Spouse(s): Lady Jane Skipworth; Elizabeth Ivey
- Relatives: John Pate (nephew), Thomas Pate (cousin)

John Pate (1632–1672) was a planter and politician who invested in land in and around Gloucester County and in his last years served on the Virginia Governor's Council.

== Early and family life ==
He was born in Leicester, England to Timothy Pate and his wife. His uncle or great-uncles included Sir John Pate (first and last) Baronet of Sisonby (1593-1659) and Richard Pate who moved across the Atlantic Ocean to Gloucester County, Virginia and became a planter as well as served a term in the House of Burgesses before dying in 1657. Men named "John Pate" emigrated to the Virginia Colony in 1651 and 1653, but they may have been indentured servants rather than this gentleman. This man had two wives the second of whom appears to have survived him and lived in England until 1689.

== Career ==
By November 1657, this man had arrived in the Virginia colony and qualified as administrator of his uncle's estate of more than 1000 acres in Gloucester County. In 1660, Pate was appointed one of the justices of the peace in Gloucester County, the justices jointly administering the county in that era, as well as acting as the lower level trial court.

In December 1662, as the tobacco boom had ended due to oversupply and massively lower prices after the passage of the Navigation Acts of 1660, John Pate patented two 200-acre tracts near his late uncle's land. In this era, land was generally patented on the basis of paying travel fares for immigrants to the colony (or purchasing enslaved people). Pate then patented 1,000 acres inland near the head of the Potomac River, and in 1660 laid claim to another 300 acres in Gloucester County on the Ware River and Mobjack Bay (across the York River from Yorktown). Three years later Pate acquired 1,200 acres inland in Old Rappahannock County on Gilson's Creek, near the holdings of Robert Beverley, who would become a major figure in suppressing Bacon's Rebellion after this man's death. In July 1669, Pate and Beverley jointly patented 6,000 acres on the upper side of the Mattaponi River in what later became King and Queen County.

In July 1668, Virginia's Secretary of State (and major planter) Thomas Ludwell entrusted Pate with a letter about tobacco prices to Lord Arlington in England, and Pate later assured Ludwell of its delivery to one of the Lord's secretaries. In 1670, Pate was named to the Virginia Governor's Council, the upper body of the Virginia General Assembly (and its highest court), and served in 1671 and 1672.

== Death and legacy ==
In 1672 Pate died while his wife was out of the county, and his brother's son Thomas Pate qualified as administrator of this man's estate. Ultimately, Thomas Pate would name one of his sons for this man, who in 1704 owned about 1,000 acres each in Gloucester and King and Queen Counties.
