= Empanada =

Baked or fried turnover consisting of pastry and filling

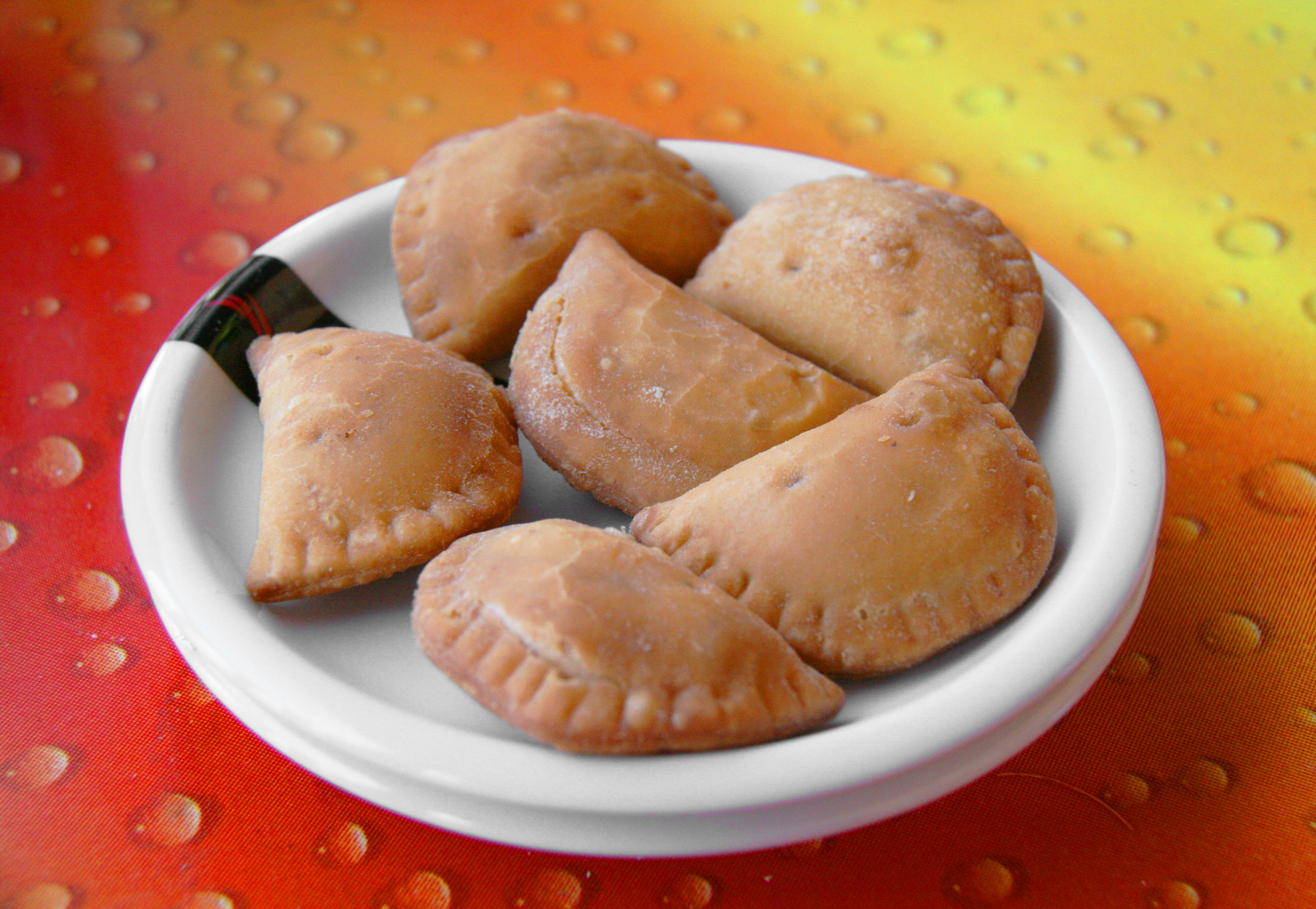
- Empanadillas from Spain
- Type: Turnover
- Course: Appetiser, main course
- Place of origin: Spain
- Region or state: Galicia
- Associated cuisine: Argentine; Chilean; Colombian; Cuban; Ecuadorian; Filipino; Galician; Mexican; Minahasan; Nicaraguan; Peruvian; Salvadoran; Sardinian; Sicilian; Spanish; Uruguayan; Venezuelan
- Main ingredients: Meat, cheese, corn, or other ingredients
- Variations: Pastel, pasty, Sri Lankan patties

An empanada is a type of baked or fried turnover consisting of pastry and filling, common in Spain, Portugal, other Southern European countries, North African countries, West African countries (where they are known as meat pies in Ghana and Nigeria), South Asian countries, Latin American countries, and the Philippines. The name comes from the Spanish empanar (to bread, i.e., to coat with bread), and translates as 'breaded', that is, wrapped or coated in bread. They are made by folding dough over a filling, which may consist of meat, cheese, tomato, corn, or other ingredients, and then cooking the resulting turnover, either by baking or frying.

== Origins ==
The origin of empanadas not currently known, but they are thought to have originated in 7th century Galicia, a region in northwest Spain.

An empanada (empãada) is mentioned in the Cantigas de Santa Maria 57:VI (c. 1282):

Entr' esses roubadores / viu jazer um vilão / desses mais malfeitores, / ũa perna na mão / de galinha, freame / que sacara com fame / entom dũ' empãada | que so um seu çurame/ comer quisera, / mais nom podera, / ca Deus nom queria.
In the midst of these robbers he saw lying there one of the most vicious of the rascals with a chicken leg in his hand. He had taken the cold morsel out of a pasty and was about to eat it under the cover of his cape. However, he could not, for God prevented it.

Rabbinic Jewish books from the same period, including the Novellae of Asher ben Jehiel (1250–1327), the Novellae of Yom Tov of Seville (c. 1260–1320), the Orchot Chayyim of Aaron ben Jacob (c. 1250–1325) and the Arba'ah Turim of Jacob ben Asher (c. 1270–1340) mention "inpanada" and "panada" as bread products containing fat, meat or fish on the inside.

A cookbook published in Catalan in 1520, Llibre del Coch by Robert de Nola, mentions empanadas filled with seafood in the recipes for Catalan, Italian, French, and Arabian food.

== By country and region ==
=== Argentina ===
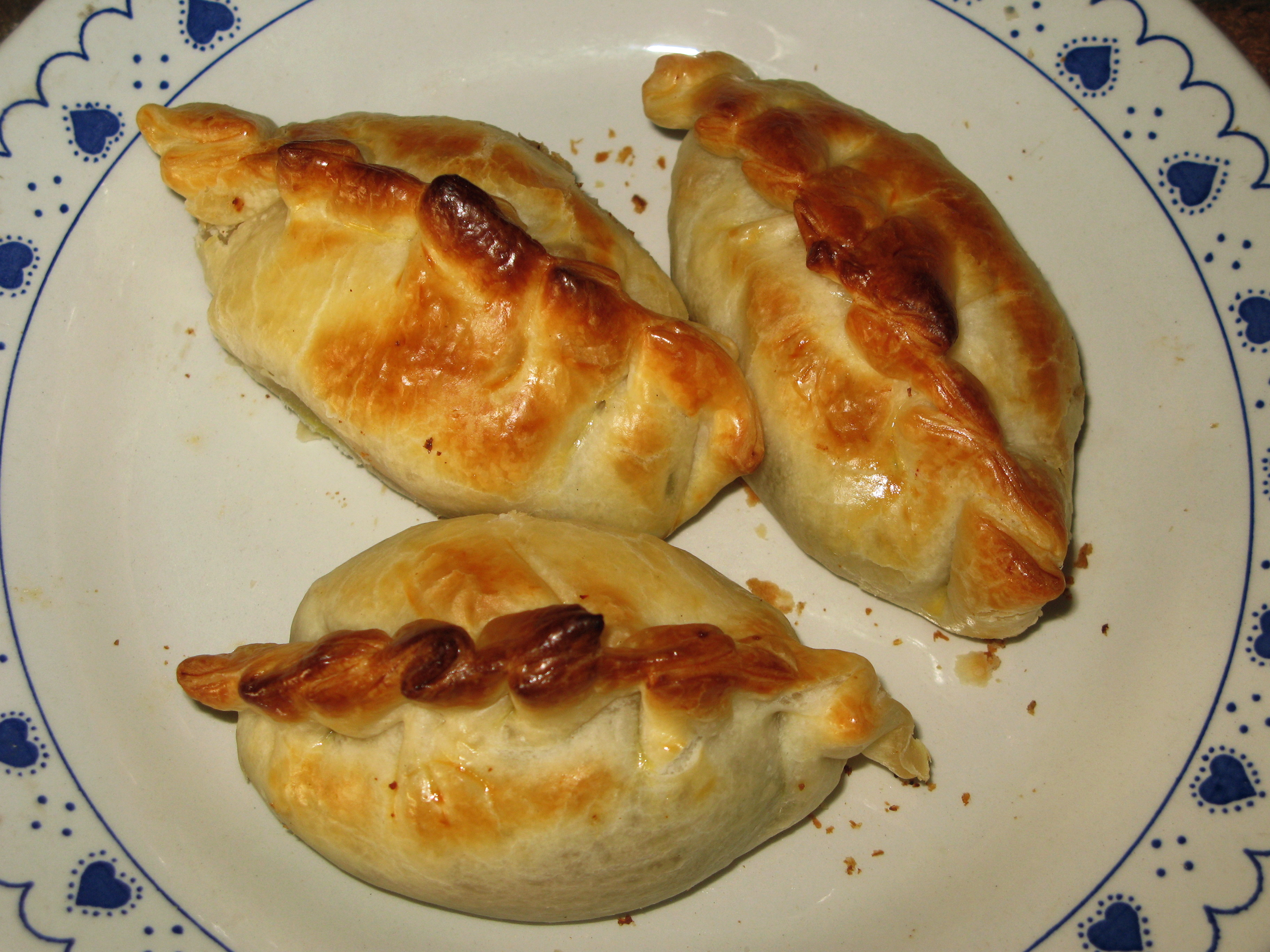
Homemade empanadas from Córdoba, Argentina

Argentine empanadas are often served during parties and festivals as a starter or main course. Shops specialize in freshly made empanadas, with many flavors and fillings.

Every region of Argentina has its own characteristic variant. Those of Salta (salteñas) are small, juicy and spicy, and contain potatoes, peppers and ground chili. These are also popular in neighbouring Bolivia.

The Jujuy variant adds peas and garlic. Its filling is called recado and the repulgue (method of closing the empanada) simbado. The La Rioja variant includes hard-boiled egg, red bell pepper, olives, and raisins. In Jujuy, there are two variants: criollas and arabes. Those of Santiago are considered especially juicy. Those of Catamarca are similar but smaller. Tucumán is known for the empanada creole; an annual National Empanada festival is held in Famaillá. Those of Famaillá are made with matambre and fried in good fat, competing with the entreveradas (mixed-grated), in which the matambre is mixed with chicken breast, garlic, ground chili, hard-boiled egg and cumin. Those of Mendoza are large and include olives and garlic. Those of San Juan have a higher proportion of onion, making them juicier and slightly sweet. Olives are also common and sometimes fat is also added to the recado or the dough. In San Luis they are big, seasoned with oregano and hot pepper, and kneaded with pork fat. In Córdoba, there is a version "Pastel Federal" "federal cake" or empanadas de Misia Manuelita. These are famous because pears boiled in wine with cloves were added to their filling. Today they are not so sweet but it is tradition to sprinkle them with sugar. In Traslasierra they add carrots and potatoes. In the Litoral, where immigrants from various parts of the world predominated, Santa Fe, Entre Ríos and Corrientes fill them with river fish, such as surubí (catfish) or dorado, or with white sauce and Goya cheese. In the Cordillera of Patagonia, they are made with lamb and on the coast with seafood. In Buenos Aires, the Creole empanada is so important that it has been declared a Cultural Heritage of Food and Gastronomy by the Argentine Ministry of Culture.

=== Belize ===
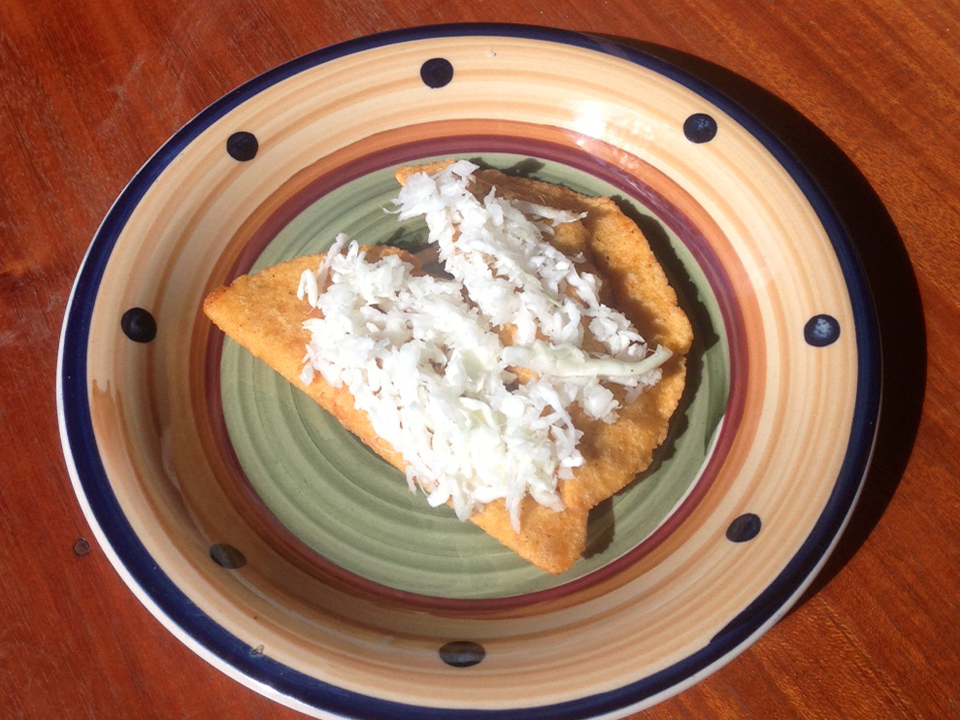
Panades in Cayo District, Belize

In Belize, empanadas are known as panades. They are made with masa (corn dough) and typically stuffed with fish, chicken, or beans. They are usually deep-fried and served with a cabbage or salsa topping. Panades are frequently sold as street food.

=== Brazil ===
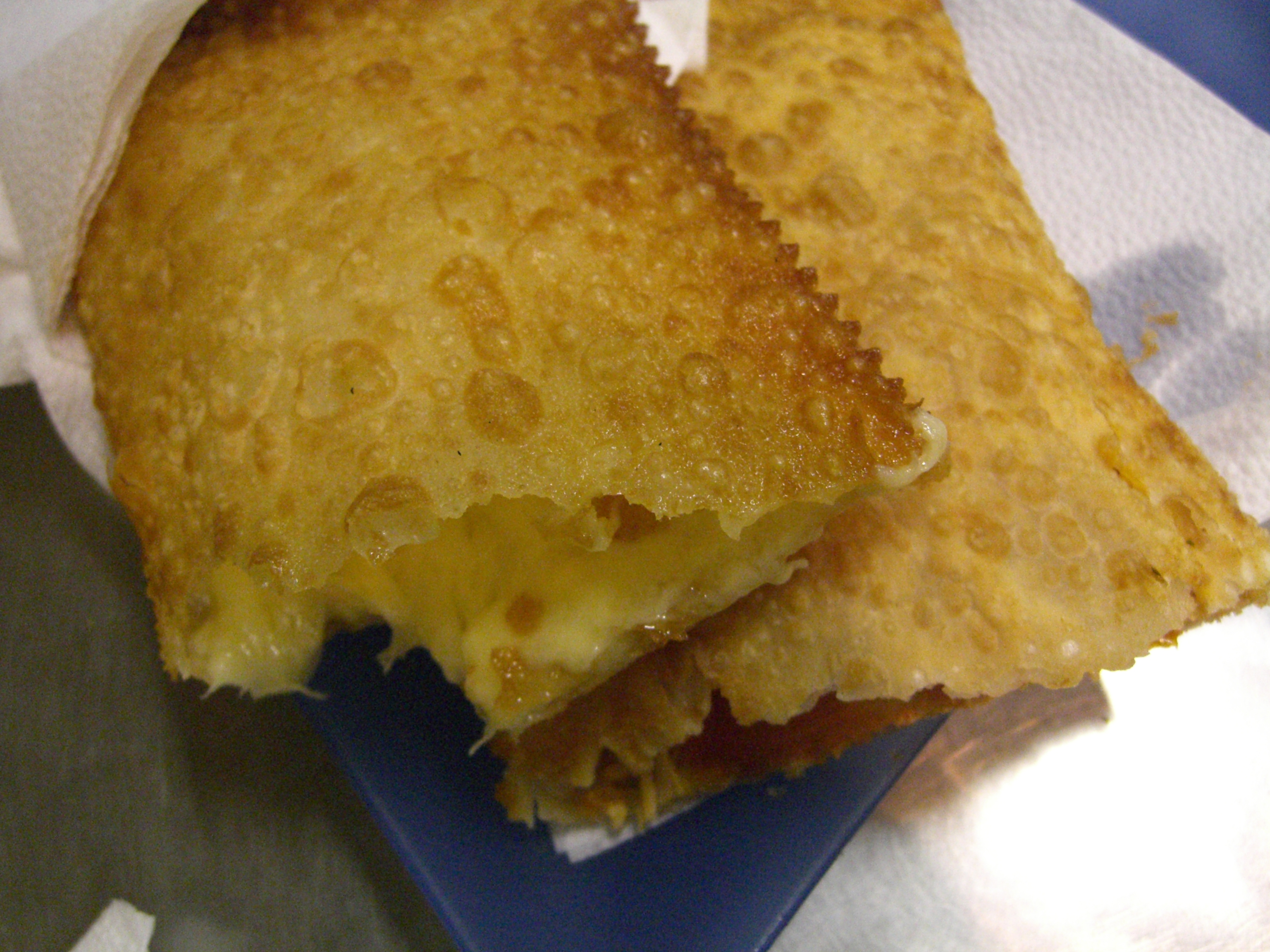
Brazilian pastel

In Brazil, a pastel (pl.: pastéis) consists of half-circle or rectangle-shaped thin-crust pies with assorted fillings, fried in vegetable oil. The result is a crispy, brownish fried pie. The most common fillings are ground meat, mozzarella, Catupiry, heart of palm, codfish, cream cheese, chicken and small shrimp. Pastéis with sweet fillings such as guava paste with Minas cheese, banana and chocolate also exist.

=== Chile ===
Traditional Chilean styles include empanada de pino "fritas"(fried) or de horno(baked), filled with seasoned ground beef, onions, olives, raisins, and hard-boiled eggs and cooked in an oven, and cheese-filled empanadas with crimped edges which are deep-fried. There are several other flavors and fillings, like shrimps and cheese, crab and cheese, neopolitan, spider crab and cheese, seafood, etc

=== Colombia ===
Colombian empanadas are a traditional type of fried pastry popular throughout Colombia. They are typically made with a cornmeal-based dough and filled with a variety of ingredients, including seasoned meats (such as beef, pork, or chicken), potatoes, rice, and vegetables. The empanadas are often deep-fried until golden and crispy, giving them a distinct texture and flavor.

Empanadas are commonly served as street food, appetizers, or snacks, and are frequently accompanied by lime wedges and ají, a spicy Colombian sauce made with chili peppers, herbs, and vinegar. The use of cornmeal distinguishes Colombian empanadas from similar pastries in other Latin American countries, which may use wheat flour.

Different regions of Colombia have their own variations of empanadas. For example, in the Andean region, fillings often include potatoes and meat, while in coastal areas, seafood empanadas are more common. Colombian empanadas are a staple in Colombian cuisine and are often enjoyed during festivals, family gatherings, and casual meals.

=== Ecuador ===
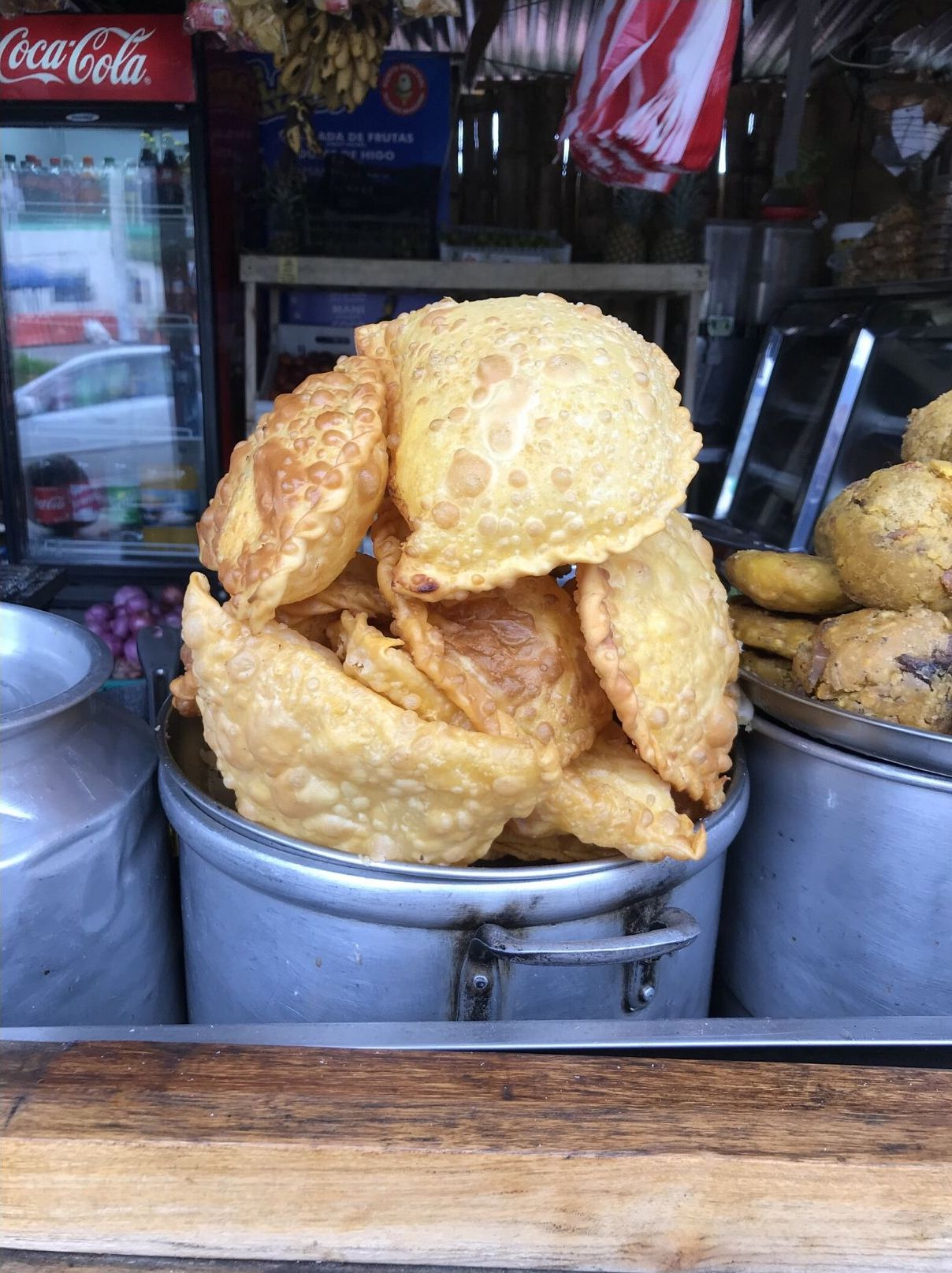
Ecuadorian empanadas de viento

The traditional Ecuadorian style is called "empanada de viento" (literally, "wind empanada"). These are made from thin-rolled flour dough and filled with cheese, sometimes with onions mixed in, and deep-fried. The "viento" refers to the fact that as they fry they fill with air, leaving them hollow (but coated with cheese inside). They can be served sweet, sprinkled with sugar, or savory, with salsa de ají.

=== El Salvador ===
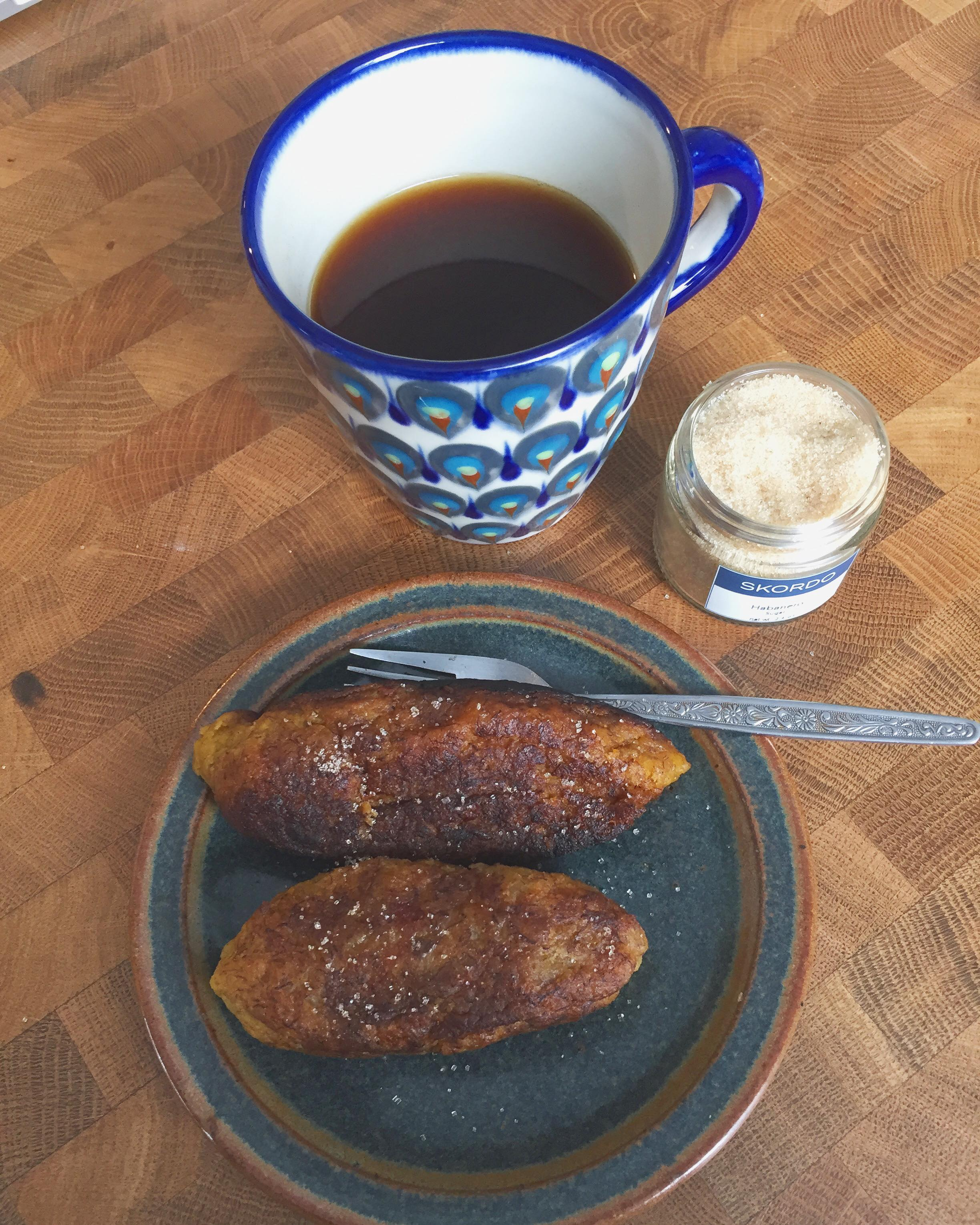
Salvadoran empanadas de plátano with coffee

El Salvador is one of the few countries where empanadas are made with plantain rather than a flour-based dough wrapping. A popular sweet variation, empanadas de plátano, are torpedo-shaped dumplings of dough made from very ripe plantains, filled with vanilla custard, fried, then rolled in sugar. They may alternatively have a filling made from refried beans rather than milk-based custard, but the flavour profile remains sweet rather than savoury.

=== France ===
In France, the traditional chaussons are made with a puff pastry dough filled with stew such as daube or confit, or a béchamel sauce mixed with ham or cheese. They also exist in sweet version (see chausson aux pommes). They are half-moon shaped. If the shape is rectangular they receive the name of friand. One regional version is the pâté lorrain, filled with pork meat cooked with wine and onions. All these versions are baked.

The fried versions can be made of puff pastry or shortcrust pastry and are called rissoles. The most famous is the rissole de Coucy, filled with meat or fish.

=== Galicia ===
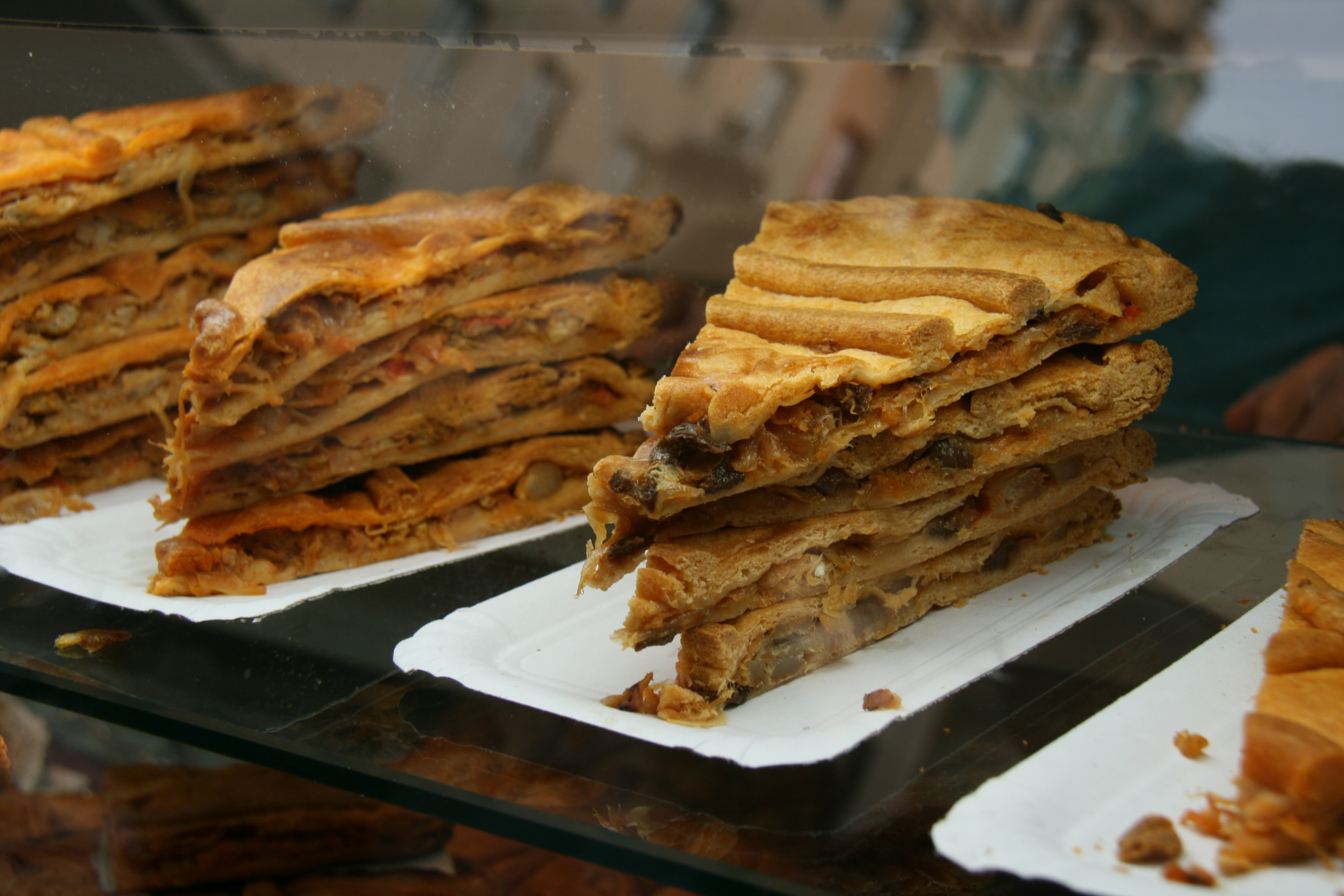
Empanadas galegas

Galician empanada (Galician: empanada galega) is a variety of empanada and one of the most popular dishes of Galician cuisine, commonly served in the towns of Galicia during festivals and pilgrimages. It is prepared with a variety of fillings, including seafood (tuna, cod, shellfish), meat, and chicken. The filling includes poached onion and, sometimes, red pepper or raisins. It can be served hot or cold. The origin of this preparation is determined in the preparation of cakes in embers that were initially made directly in embers until it evolved into a preparation in clay pots that give it its current characteristic round shape. The preparation is mainly homemade and is done in ovens, but nowadays, it is common to find it for sale in bakeries or street stalls.

The history of this dish in the region dates back to the Visigothic era in the 7th century, when rules for their preparation were decreed. The first referenced empanada used mushroom or chicken fillings. The empanada was an ideal food for travelers because it is a covered preparation that prevented contact of the interior with the dust of the roads. Galician empanadas appear sculpted as early as the 12th century on the Portico of Glory in Santiago de Compostela.

=== Indonesia ===
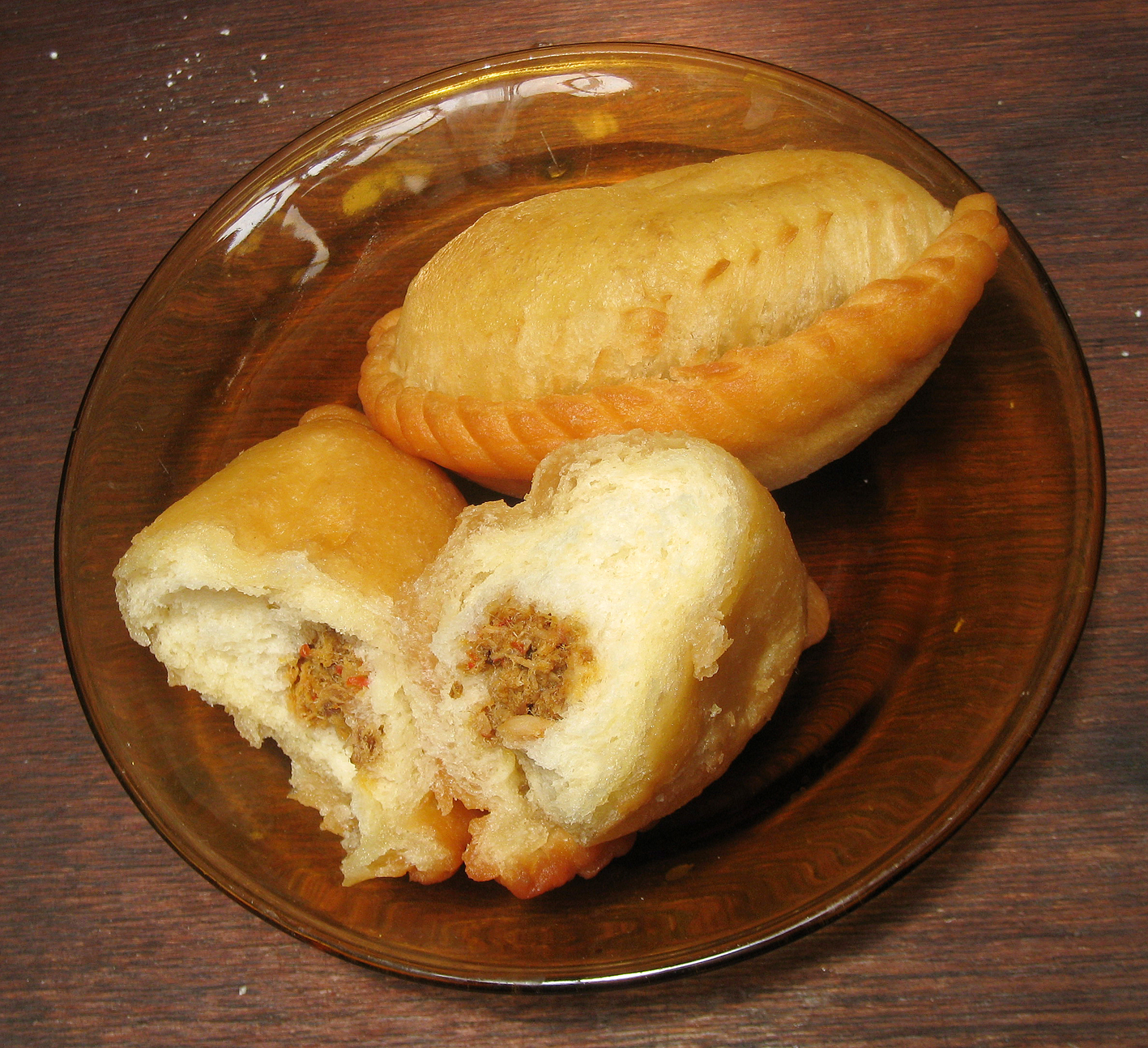
Indonesian Minahasan panadas

In Indonesia, empanadas are known as panada. They are especially popular in Manado cuisine of North Sulawesi where their panada has a thick crust made from fried bread, filled with spicy cakalang fish (skipjack tuna) and chili, curry, potatoes or quail eggs. The panada in North Sulawesi was derived from Portuguese influence in the region. The dish is similar to karipap in Malaysia and Indonesia and pastel, although they have a thinner crust compared to panada.

=== Italy ===
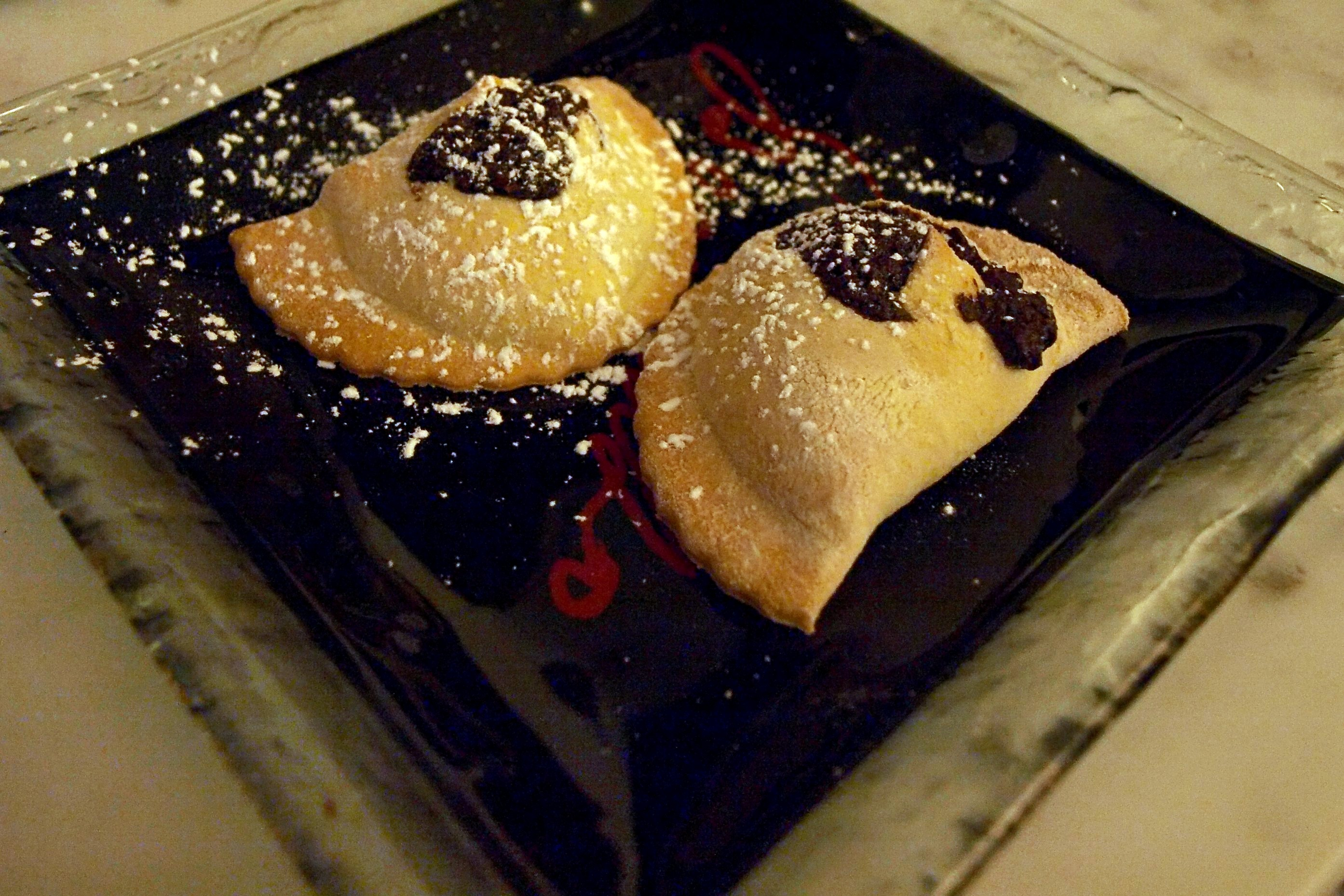
Sicilian 'mpanatigghi

The Sicilian 'mpanatigghi are stuffed, consisting of half-moon-shaped panzerotti filled with a mixture of almonds, walnuts, chocolate, sugar, cinnamon, cloves and minced beef. These are typical of Modica, in the province of Ragusa, Sicily. They are also known by the italianized word impanatiglie or dolce di carne (pasty of meat).

They were probably introduced by the Spaniards during their rule in Sicily which took place in the sixteenth century; this is suggested by the etymology of the name which comes from the Spanish empanadas or empanadillas, as well as the somewhat unusual combination of meat and chocolate, which occurs occasionally in Spanish cuisine. In previous centuries, game meat was used in 'mpanatigghi; today beef is used.

=== Mexico ===
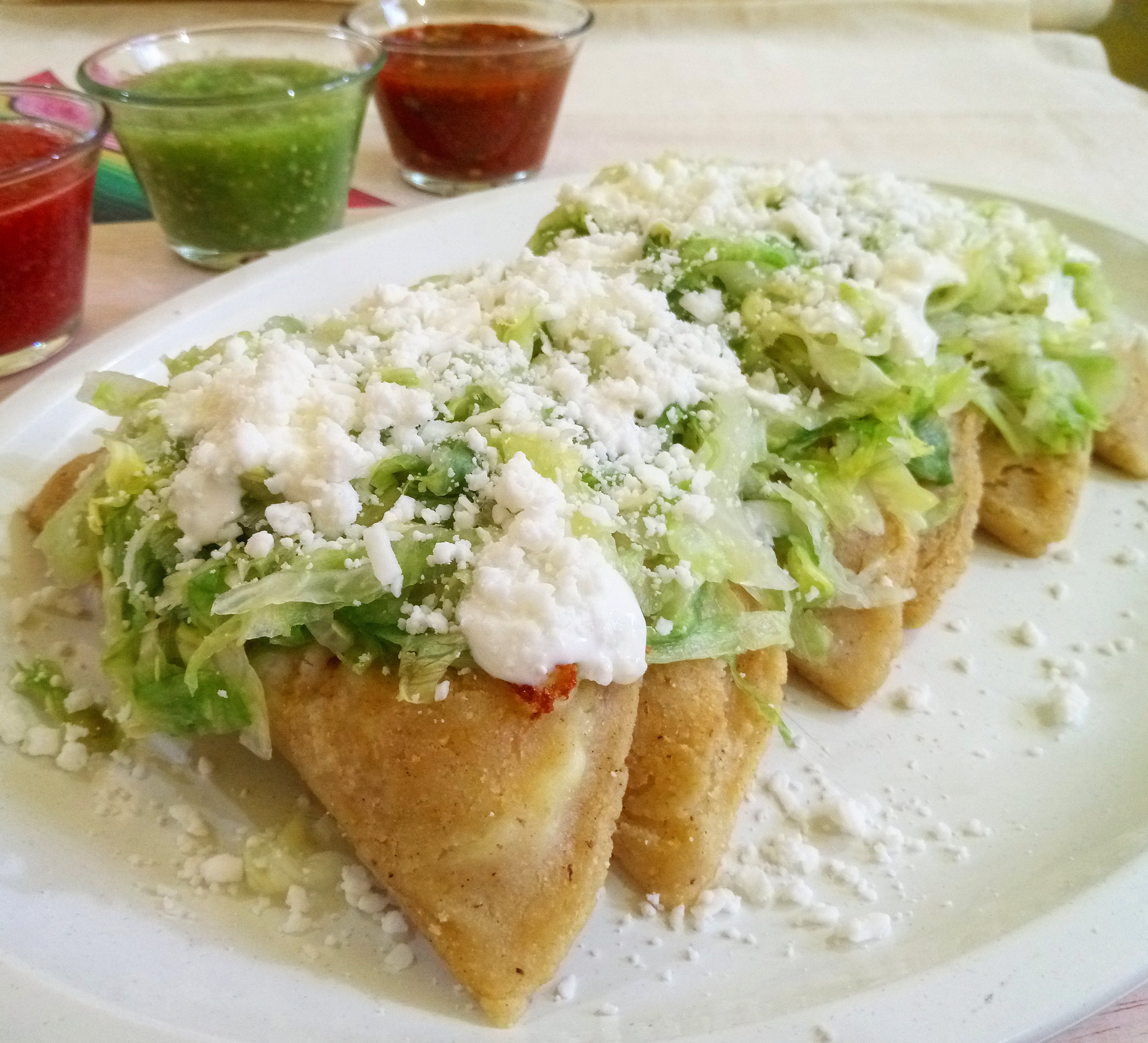
Mexican fried corn empanadas

Empanadas are common in Mexico, although the dish there is noticeably different. Mexican empanadas are made of fried corn paste masa instead of flour, similar to gorditas or huaraches. They are usually filled with taco ingredients, such as refried beans, boiled chicken, boiled chopped potato with white cheese, pork belly and ground beef, and are typically garnished with pickled cabbage salad, white queso fresco, cream and spicy tomato sauce. It is commonly served, along with flautas, as a cheap appetizer in fair stands and other outdoor events due to its quick preparation.

=== Philippines ===
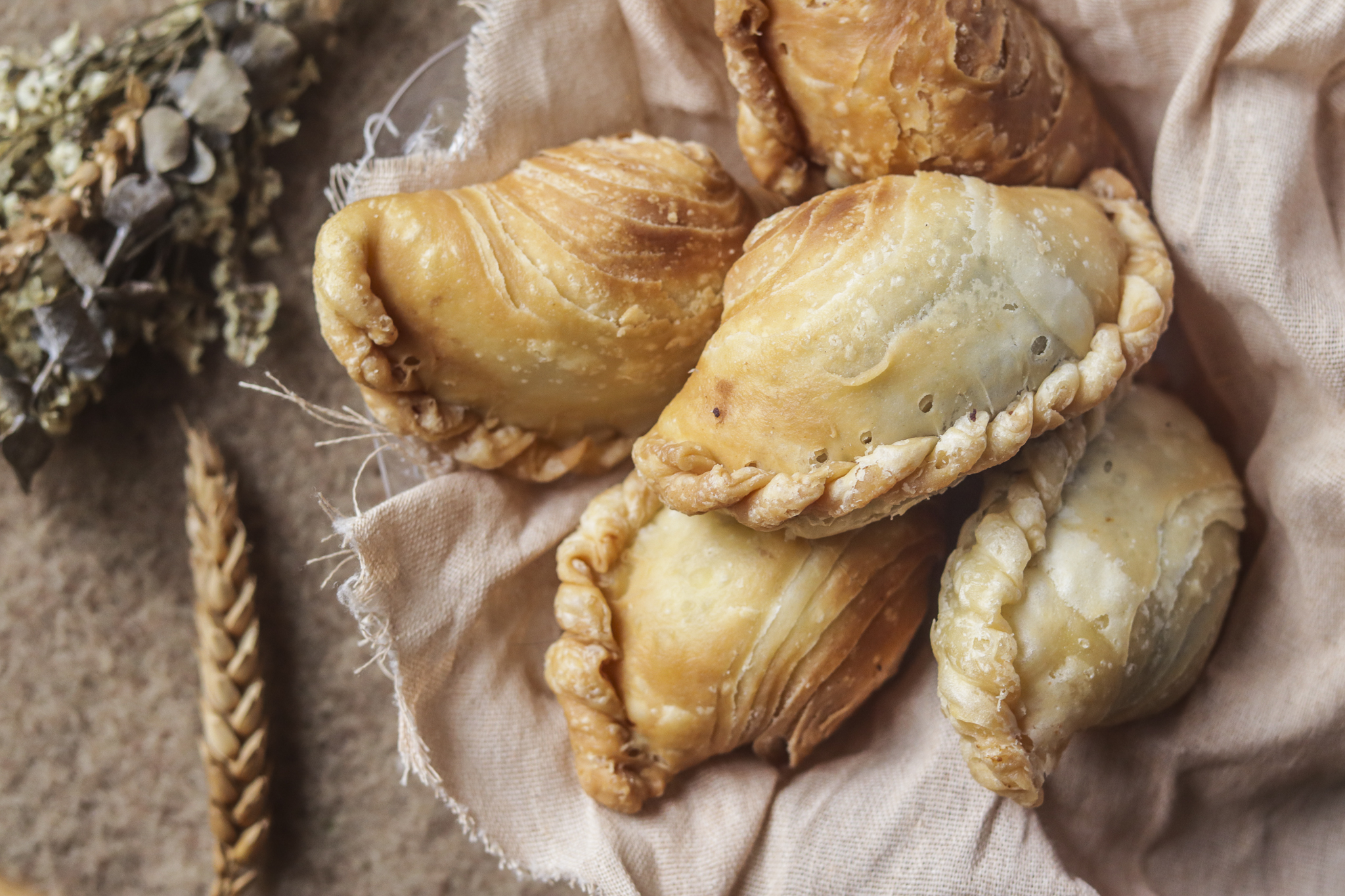
Philippine fried empanadas, with ground beef, potatoes, carrots, cheese, and raisins in a thin, crisp crust

Filipino empanadas usually contain ground beef, pork or chicken, potatoes, chopped onions, and raisins (picadillo-style), in a somewhat sweet, wheat flour bread. There are two kinds available: the baked sort and the flaky fried type. To lower costs, potatoes are often added as an extender, while another filling is kutsáy (garlic chives).

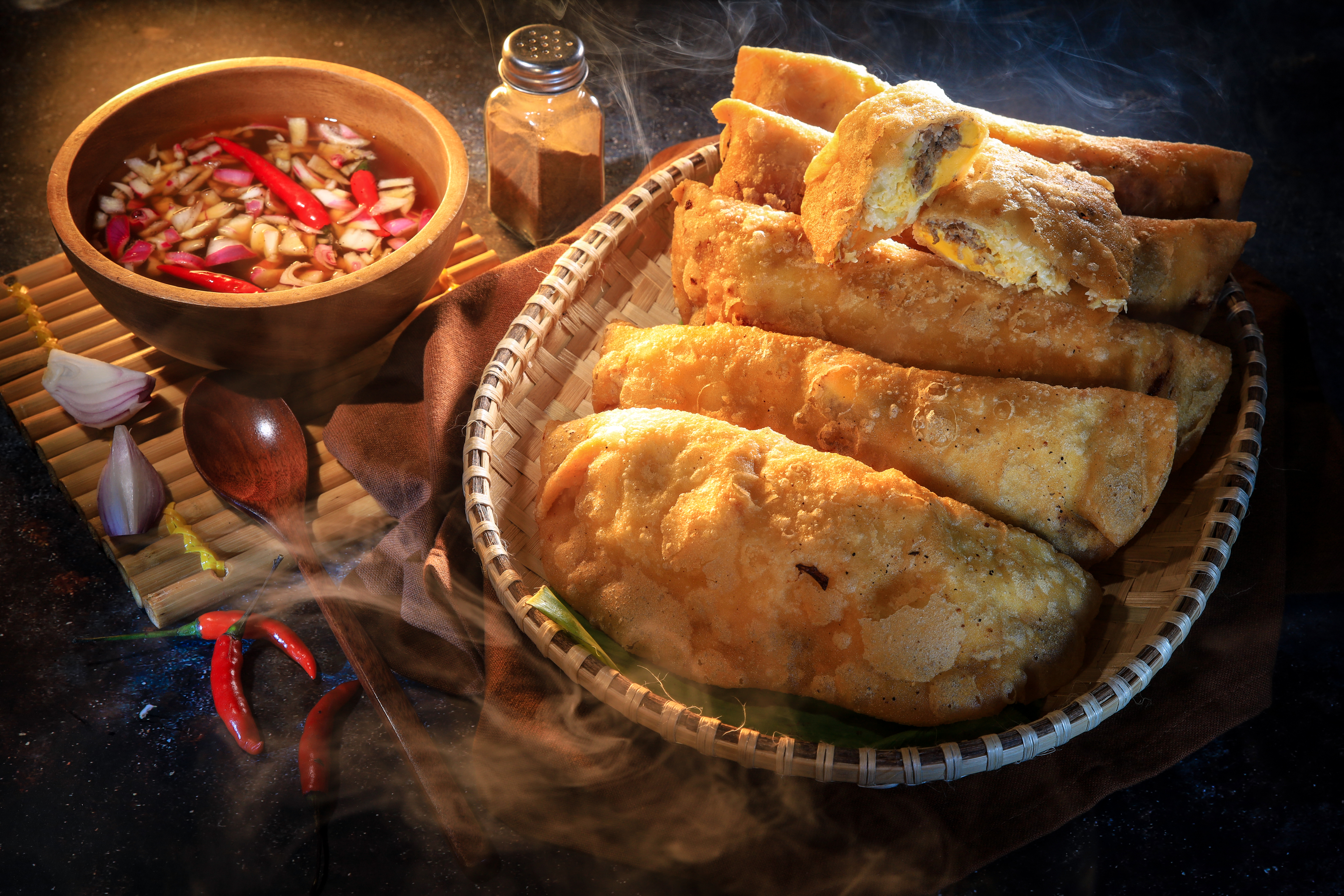
Vigan Empanada has a pale color with thinner dough and is typically filled with green papaya or mixed with cabbage.

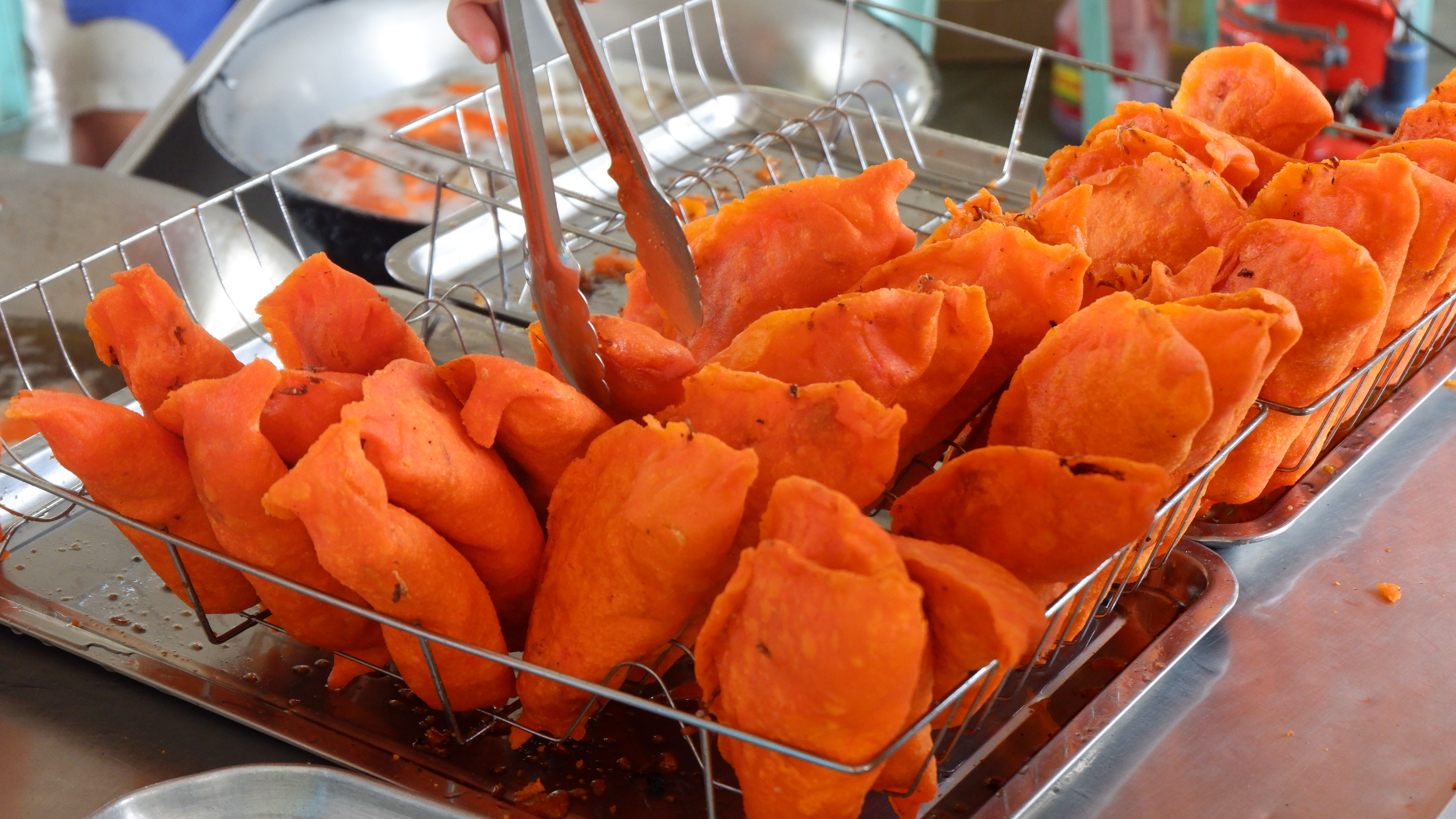
Batac Empanada has an orange-tinged color and is typically filled with mung bean sprouts and green papaya.

Empanadas in the northern part of the Philippines, particularly in Ilocos, are known as Ilocos Empanada or Empanada de Ilocos. These empanadas are characterized by savory fillings, typically including green papaya, mung beans, and sometimes chopped cabbage. They are also commonly filled with Ilocano sausage, or Vigan longganisa, and egg yolk. The empanada is deep-fried and made with glutinous rice paste (galapong) or rice flour combined with annatto, which gives the dough its distinct orange color and contributes to a crunchier texture. Ilocos Empanadas can also be filled with mashed eggplant, scrambled eggs, and cabbage, which is called poqui poqui.

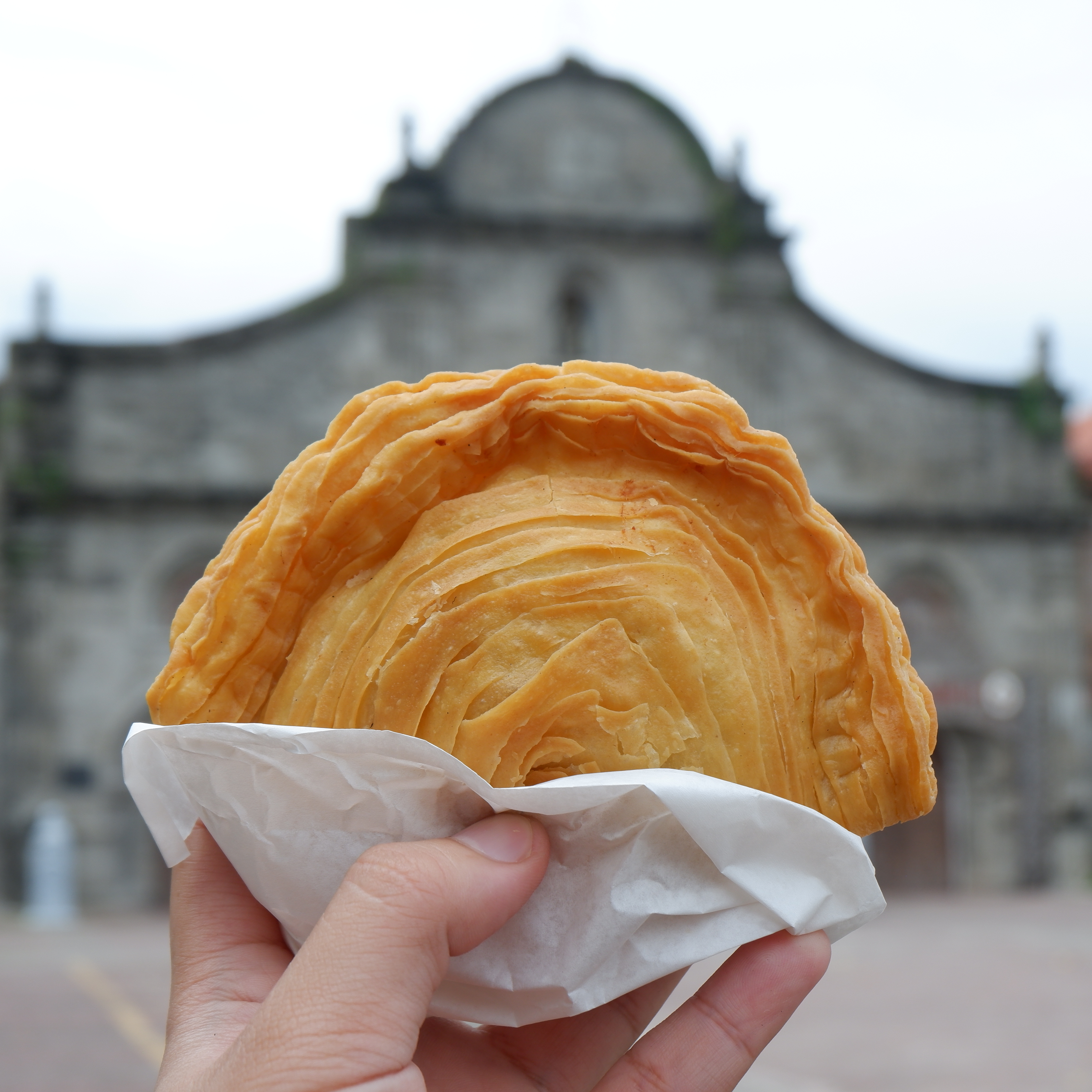
Empanada de kaliskís(lit. 'fish scale empanada'), a traditional empanada from Bulacan, Philippines, with a croissant-like flaky layered crust

In Bulacan, empanada de kaliskís (lit. 'fish scale empanada'), uniquely has a flaky multilayered crust resembling scales, hence the name. In Cebu, empanada Danao is a characteristically sweet-savoury variant filled with chopped chorizo and chayote, deep-fried, and dusted in white sugar before serving. In Zamboanga, empanada Zamboangueño is filled with chopped sweet potato, garbanzo beans, and served with a sweet vinegar dipping sauce.

Dessert versions of empanadas also exist, notably empanaditas, which commonly have a filling of latik (coconut caramel), honey and nuts, or peanut butter. Kapampangan empanaditas have a yema (custard) and cashew nut filling. In Cebu, sinudlan empanada is a small deep-fried empanada filled with bukayo (sweetened coconut meat).

=== Portugal ===
In Portugal, there are foods called "Pasteis de Bacalhau" and "Rissols." These fried treats are both made with fish, the pasteis being made with codfish and the rissoles being made with shrimp. These are delicacies known far and wide throughout the country.

=== Puerto Rico ===
In Puerto Rico, empanadas are made of a flour base and fried, and are known as empanadillas. Common fillings include meat such as ground beef picadillo, pork, chicken, pizza (marinara sauce and cheese), guava and cheese, jueyes (crab), chapín (Spotted trunkfish), conch, rabbit, octopus, and much more depending on local cuisine.

=== United States ===
Empanadas, mainly based on South American recipes, are widely available in New York City, New Jersey, Baltimore, Philadelphia, Washington, D.C., and Miami from food carts, food trucks, and restaurants. Empanadas are usually found in U.S. areas with a large Hispanic population, such as San Antonio, Los Angeles, and San Francisco.

=== Venezuela ===
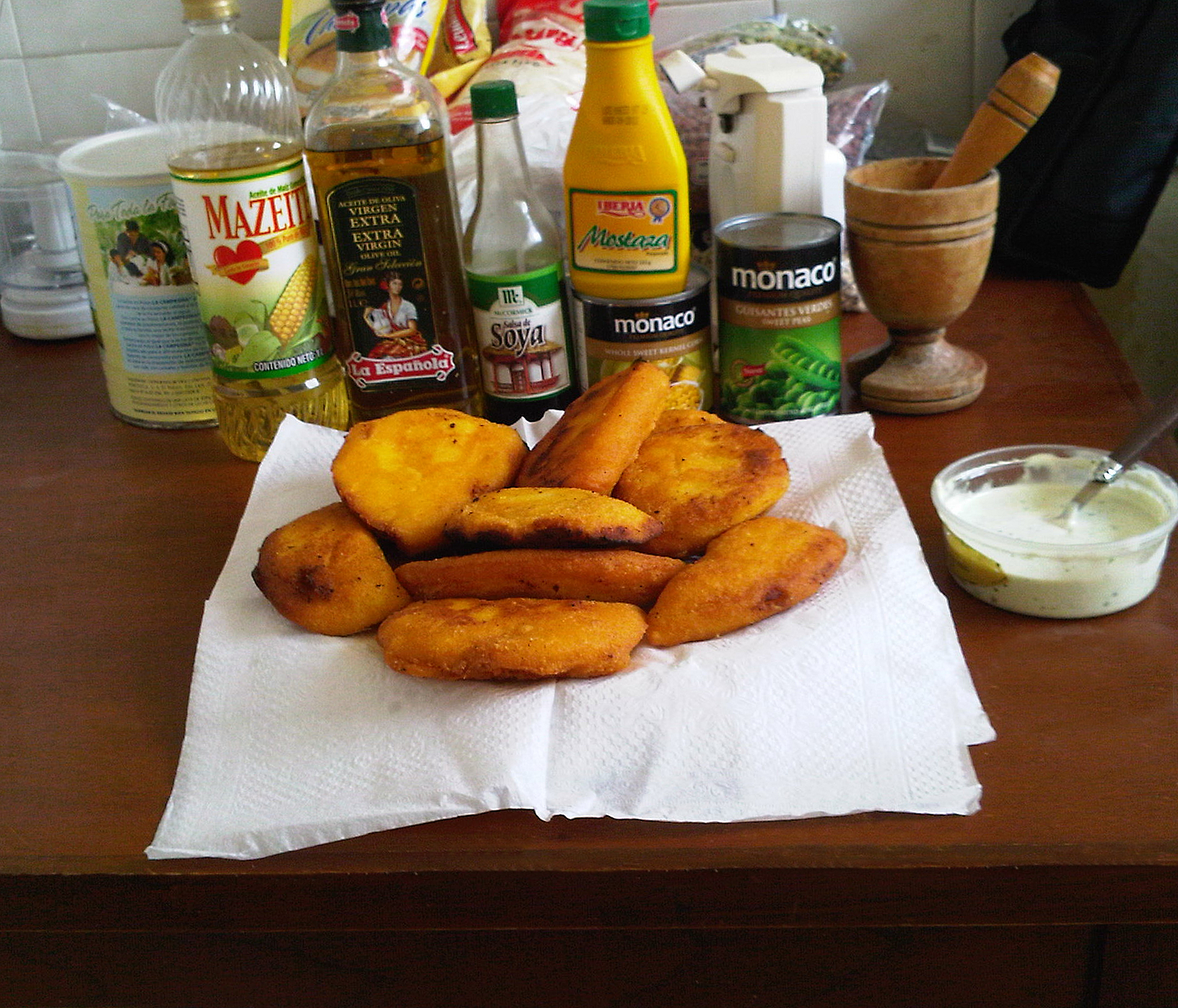
Homemade Venezuelan empanadas

Traditional Venezuelan empanadas are made with ground corn dough, though modern versions are made with precooked corn. The dough may have a yellow color when toasted due to the addition of annatto. The fillings are very diverse, with the most conventional being cheese, shredded beef, chicken, cazón (school shark) in the Margaritan Island region especially, ham, black beans and cheese (commonly called dominó) and even combinations of mollusks. The empanadas have a half-moon shape and are fried in oil. Sometimes, they may have more than one filling, such as in empanadas de pabellón, which are made with a shredded beef filling (or cazón in the Margarita Island region), black beans, slices of fried plantain, and shredded white cheese.

== Similar foods ==
The empanada resembles savory pastries found in many other cultures, such as the molote, pirozhki,, chebureki, calzone, samosa, gujhia, knish, kreatopitakia, khuushuur, Natchitoches meat pie, Jamaican patty and pasty.

In most Malay-speaking countries in Southeast Asia, the pastry is commonly called epok-epok or karipap (English: curry puff). Fried dumplings are found in Chinese cuisine (Yau gok) and in Vietnamese cuisine (bánh gối).
