= Pasty (disambiguation) =

A pasty is a British baked pastry.

Pasty or Pastie may also refer to:

- Pastie, a large, round patéd pie eaten in Northern Ireland
- Pasties, adhesive coverings applied to cover a person's nipples
- Pasty (horse), a racehorse
- Pasty Harris (born 1944), English cricketer (from Cornwall)
- a pale and unhealthy appearance; pallor

== See also ==
- Pate (disambiguation)
