= Pate baronets =

Extinct baronetcy in the Baronetage of England

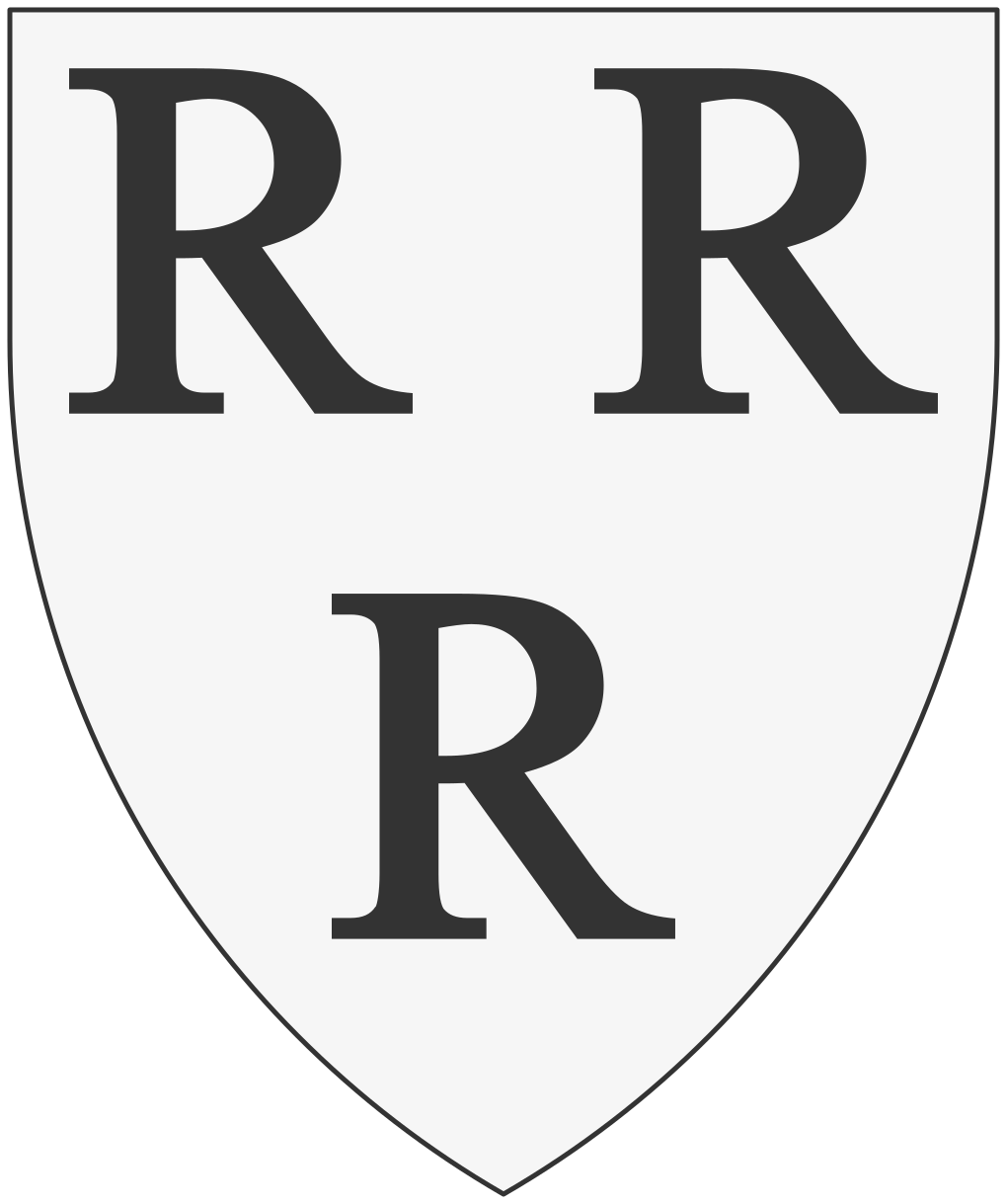
Arms of Pate of Sysonby

The Pate Baronetcy, of Sysonby in the County of Leicester, was a title in the Baronetage of England. It was created on 28 October 1643 for John Pate. The title became extinct on his death in 1659.

== Pate baronets, of Sysonby (1643) ==
- Sir John Pate, 1st Baronet (died 1659)
