= Cole Proctor =

American football coach and scout (1942–2020)

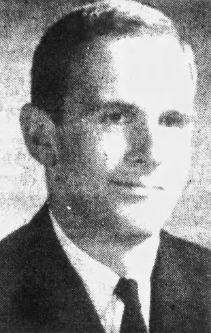
- Proctor in 1968

Biographical details
- Born: June 25, 1942; Meriden, Connecticut, U.S.
- Died: September 18, 2020 (aged 78); Cincinnati, Ohio, U.S.
- Education: Morehead State University (1967, 1968)

Playing career
- 1962–1963: State College of Iowa
- 1964–1966: Morehead State
- Position: Offensive tackle

Coaching career (HC unless noted)
- 1967: Morehead State (GA)
- 1968: Lees–McRae (line)
- 1969–1971: Gardner–Webb (line)
- 1972: Chatham Township HS (NJ)
- 1973–1975: Keene HS (NH)
- 1976–1978: Lees–McRae
- 1979–1980: East Tennessee State (DL)
- 1981–1985: San Diego State (DL)
- 1986: Iowa State (DL)
- 1987–1989: Utah (DL)
- 1990–1993: Morehead State
- 1994–1998: Arizona Cardinals (scout)
- 1999–2011: Tennessee Titans (scout)

Administrative career (AD unless noted)
- 1976–1979: Lees–McRae

Head coaching record
- Overall: 15–29 (college); 14–15 (junior college); 12–27 (high school)

Accomplishments and honors

Awards
- OVC Coach of the Year (1990)

Cole A. Proctor (June 25, 1942 – September 18, 2020) was an American college football coach and scout. He was the head football coach for Chatham Township High School in 1972, Keene High School from 1973 to 1975, Lees–McRae College from 1976 to 1978, and Morehead State University from 1990 to 1993. He also coached for Gardner–Webb, East Tennessee State, San Diego State, Iowa State, and Utah. He served as a scout for the Arizona Cardinals and Tennessee Titans of the National Football League (NFL). He played college football for State College of Iowa—now known as Northern Iowa—and Morehead State as an offensive tackle.

== Early life and playing career ==
Proctor was born in Meriden, Connecticut, attended Lyman Hall High School, and prepped at Bridgton Academy in North Bridgton, Maine. While attending Lyman Hall he received All-State honors in football.

Proctor signed to play college football for the State College of Iowa—now known as Northern Iowa—from 1962 to 1963. In 1964, he transferred to Morehead State University. He was a member of the 1966 Ohio Valley Conference (OVC) championship team. He received his bachelor's and master's degrees in education in 1967 and 1968, respectively.

== Coaching career ==
Proctor began his coaching career as the line coach under head coach George Litton for Lees–McRae. He replaced Jerry Kirk who was hired as the line coach for Ferrum, a fellow Coastal Football Conference (CFC) opponent. He resigned after one season to accept a similar position at Gardner–Webb. He was retained as Litton was hired as head coach in 1970.

In 1972, Proctor was hired as the head football coach for Chatham Township High School in Chatham Township, New Jersey. He inherited a team that went 3–6. Despite only having 28 players on the roster, he helped lead the team to a 7–2 record, the conference championship, and he was named conference coach of the year. After his lone year in New Jersey, he was hired as the head football coach for Keene High School in Keene, New Hampshire. In his first season with the Blackbirds, the team finished winless with an 0–10 record. In three seasons he amassed an overall record of 12–27.

In 1976, Proctor was hired as the head football coach for Lees–McRae, rejoining the team after seven years away. He finished his three-year career with an overall record of 14–15 with his best season coming in his first as the team finished 5–4. In 1979, he left Lees–McRae and was hired as the defensive line coach for East Tennessee State under head coach Jack Carlisle. In 1981, he resigned from East Tennessee State and was hired as the defensive line coach for San Diego State. After five seasons with San Diego State, he was hired in the same capacity for Iowa State. In 1987, Proctor was hired to be defensive line coach for his fourth school at Utah.

In 1990, Proctor earned his second collegiate head coaching job as he was hired by his alma mater, Morehead State. In four years with the team he finished with an overall record of 15–29. During his tenure, he hired future NFL head coach Rex Ryan as his defensive coordinator. He resigned from the team after the university's president Ronald G. Eaglin attempted to turn Morehead State into a non-scholarship football school.

From 1994 to 2011, Proctor served as a scout for the Arizona Cardinals and Tennessee Titans of the National Football League (NFL).

== Personal life ==
In 1983, Proctor was indicted on four felony counts of grand theft and insurance fraud. It was alleged that he made a false $20,000 insurance claim on a $14,000 boat and trailer that he and a partner had hidden in Mexico. Richard Guseman, a former California Highway Patrol officer who pleaded guilty to two felony charges of insurance fraud in June 1983, assisted Proctor by filing a false $6,934 insurance claim from an unrelated case in January and was assumed to be the partner in Proctor's alleged crime.

Proctor died on September 18, 2020, in his home in Cincinnati.

== Head coaching record ==
=== College ===
Year	Team	Overall	Conference	Standing	Bowl/playoffs
Morehead State Eagles (Ohio Valley Conference) (1990–1993)
1990	Morehead State	5–6	3–3	T–4th	
1991	Morehead State	4–7	3–4	T–3rd	
1992	Morehead State	3–8	3–5	5th	
1993	Morehead State	3–8	2–6	T–7th	
Morehead State:		15–29	11–18		
Total:		15–29			

=== Junior college ===
Year	Team	Overall	Conference	Standing	Bowl/playoffs
Lees–McRae Bobcats (Coastal Football Conference) (1976–1978)
1976	Lees–McRae	5–4	3–2	3rd (Southern)	
1977	Lees–McRae	4–6	1–4	7th	
1978	Lees–McRae	5–5	2–4	6th	
Lees–McRae:		14–15	6–10		
Total:		14–15			

=== High school ===
Year	Team	Overall	Conference	Standing	Bowl/playoffs
Chatham Township Gladiators () (1972)
1972	Chatham Township	7–2		1st	
Chatham Township:		7–2			
Keene Blackbirds () (1973–1975)
1973	Keene	0–10			
1974	Keene	3–7			
1975	Keene	2–8			
Keene:		5–25			
Total:		12–27			
National championship Conference title Conference division title or championship game berth
