= Bill Bomar (American football) =

American athletics coach and administrator (1921–1987)

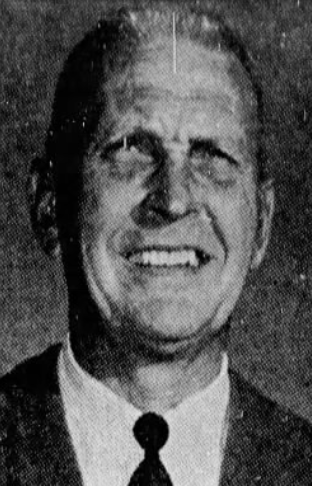
- Bomar in 1969

Biographical details
- Born: July 29, 1921; Nashville, Tennessee, U.S.
- Died: May 27, 1987 (aged 65); Crossnore, North Carolina, U.S.
- Education: University of Georgia (1950, 1951, 1972)

Playing career

Basketball
- 1946–1947: Austin Peay

Baseball
- 1947: Austin Peay
- 1948–1951: Georgia
- Positions: Guard (basketball); Third baseman (baseball)

Coaching career (HC unless noted)

Football
- 1951–1955: Puntam County HS (GA)
- 1956–1962: Dunnellon HS (FL)
- 1963–1965: Citrus HS (FL)
- 1966–1969: Palmetto HS (FL)
- 1971–1977: Southeast HS (FL) (freshmen)
- 1979: Lees–McRae
- c. 1980s: Avery County HS (NC) (OC)

Basketball
- 1951–1956: Puntam County HS (GA)
- 1956–1963: Dunnellon HS (FL)
- 1963–1966: Citrus HS (FL)

Baseball
- 1952–1956: Puntam County HS (GA)
- 1957–1963: Dunnellon HS (FL)
- 1964–1966: Citrus HS (FL)
- 1972–1978: Southeast HS (FL)
- c. 1980s: Avery County HS (NC) (assistant)

Administrative career (AD unless noted)
- 1951–1956: Puntam County HS (GA)
- 1956–1963: Dunnellon HS (FL)
- 1963–1966: Citrus HS (FL)
- 1979–1980: Lees–McRae

Head coaching record
- Overall: 6–4 (junior college football)

William McKinley Bomar (July 29, 1921 – May 27, 1987) was an American athletics coach, administrator, and minister.

== Playing career ==
Bomar graduated from Cohn High School in Nashville, Tennessee. He then played college basketball for Austin Peay in 1946 as a guard. He then transferred to Georgia to play baseball as a third baseman. While attending Georgia, he played semi-professional basketball alongside Sam Bailey and John Rauch.

== Coaching career ==
In 1951, Bomar was named head football, basketball, baseball coach, and athletic director for Putnam County High School in Eatonton, Georgia. As head football coach, he helped lead the team to an 8–2 record in 1952. After five seasons with Putnam County, he was hired in the same four positions for Dunnellon High School. In 1960, he led the school to the inaugural Rainbow Invitational Prep Basketball Tournament.

In 1963, Bomar was hired by Citrus High School, again for the same four positions as his previous two schools. In 1968, he led the football team to an undefeated regular season at 10–0, while winning the Coral Coast Conference and fourth district, before falling in the first game of the state playoffs. After finishing the next season with a consecutive 10–1 record, Bomar was named coach of the year by his peers. He resigned in May 1970 to work on his doctorate at the University of Georgia.

In 1971, following Bomar's one-year coaching hiatus, he was hired as the head baseball coach and freshmen football coach for Southeast High School. In 1978, he resigned from both positions. He was hired as the head football coach and athletic director for Lees–McRae College, his first non-high school position. He resigned after fifteen months.

Bomar later served as an assistant football and assistant baseball coach for Avery County High School.

== Personal life and death ==
In 1951, alongside Bomar's coaching positions, he was the director of Commerce Mills Recreation Department.

Bomar lived as a devote Christian. After retiring from coaching he served as a minister for the Spruce Pine Presbyterian Church.

Bomar and his wife, Margie, had five children together. He died on May 27, 1987, at Sloop Memorial Hospital in Crossnore, North Carolina, after a battle with cancer.

== Head coaching record ==
=== Junior college football ===
Year	Team	Overall	Conference	Standing	Bowl/playoffs
Lees–McRae Bobcats (Coastal Football Conference) (1979)
1979	Lees–McRae	6–4	4–2	2nd	
Lees–McRae:		6–4	4–2		
Total:		6–4			
