= Mike Cook (American football) =

American football coach (1938–2021)

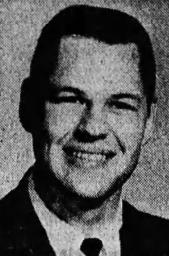
- Cook in 1971

Biographical details
- Born: April 16, 1938; Brooklyn, New York, U.S.
- Died: May 21, 2021 (aged 83); Fletcher, North Carolina, U.S.
- Education: Clemson University; Coker College (1963); Appalachian State University (1968)

Coaching career (HC unless noted)
- 1963–1965: Flat Creek HS (SC) (assistant)
- 1966: Appalachian State (GA)
- 1967–1969: Andrews HS (SC)
- 1970: Lees–McRae (OL)
- 1971–1974: Lees–McRae
- 1975–1976: Wake Forest (OB)
- 1977: Wake Forest (WR)
- 1978–1980: Madison HS (NC)
- 1981–1982: Mars Hill (DL)
- 1983–1984: Owen HS (NC)

Administrative career (AD unless noted)
- 1978–1981: Madison HS (NC)

Head coaching record
- Overall: 22–14–1 (junior college)

Accomplishments and honors

Awards
- CFC Coach of the Year (1974)

Michael George Cook Sr. (April 16, 1938 – May 25, 2021) was an American college football coach. He was the head football coach for Lees–McRae College from 1971 to 1974.

== Coaching career ==
Cook began his coaching career as an assistant at Flat Creek High School. After three seasons he was hired as a graduate assistant for Appalachian State. In 1967, he was named the head football coach for Andrews High School. In his first season, he helped lead the team to an 8–1–1 record and were 6B conference champions. In 1970, he served as the offensive line coach at Lees–McRae under head coach Jim Osborne.

In 1971, Cook was promoted to head football coach. In four seasons, he led the team to an overall record of 22–14–1 and was named Coastal Football Conference (CFC) Coach of the Year in 1974. He resigned to accept an assistant coach position at Wake Forest. After a 1–10 season in 1977, Cook was fired alongside the rest of the staff. He was then hired as the head football coach and athletic director for Madison High School.

Cook resigned in 1980 and was hired as the defensive line coach for Mars Hill. In 1983, he was hired as the head football coach for Charles D. Owen High School.

== Personal life ==
Cook grew up in Kershaw, South Carolina, and received degrees from Clemson University, Coker University, and Appalachian State University.

Cook and his wife, Sandra, had three children together. He died on May 25, 2021, in his home in Fletcher, North Carolina.

== Head coaching record ==
=== Junior college ===
Year	Team	Overall	Conference	Standing	Bowl/playoffs
Lees–McRae Bobcats (Coastal Football Conference) (1971–1974)
1971	Lees–McRae	6–3–1	4–1–1	2nd	
1972	Lees–McRae	3–6	2–4	T–4th	
1973	Lees–McRae	7–2	3–2	3rd	
1974	Lees–McRae	6–3	3–3	4th	
Lees–McRae:		22–14–1	12–10–1		
Total:		22–14–1			
