= 1987 Lees–McRae Bobcats football team =

American college football season

1987 Lees–McRae Bobcats football

CFC champion

East Bowl, W 20–13 vs. Grand Rapids
- Conference: Coastal Football Conference
- Record: 12–0 (5–0 CFC)
- Head coach: Mac Bryan (2nd season)
- Home stadium: Tate Field

1987 Coastal Football Conference standings
	Conf.					Overall
Team	W		L		T	W		L		T
Lees–McRae $	5	–	0	–	0	12	–	0	–	0
Montgomery (MD)	3	–	2	–	0	7	–	2	–	0
Chowan	3	–	2	–	0	6	–	4	–	1
Nassau	2	–	3	–	0	4	–	4	–	0
Hudson Valley	0	–	5	–	0	2	–	7	–	1
Potomac State	?	–	?	–	?	5	–	4	–	0
$ – Conference champion

The 1987 Lees–McRae Bobcats football team was an American football team that represented Lees–McRae College as a member of the Coastal Football Conference (CFC) during the 1987 junior college football season. In their second year under head coach Mac Bryan, the Bobcats compiled a perfect 12–0 record (5–0 against CFC opponents), won the CFC championship, outscored opponents by a total of 355 to 84, and won the East Bowl against Grand Rapids 20–13.

Despite finishing the season undefeated and being ranked No. 1 in the nation for the majority of the season, Lees–McRae lost their national championship by one point to Ellsworth in the polls.

Lees–McRae played its games on Tate Field in Banner Elk, North Carolina.

== Schedule ==
Date	Opponent	Rank	Site	Result	Attendance	Source
September 3	Gardner–Webb JV*	No. 4	Tate Field; Banner Elk, NC	W 51–0		
September 12	at Nassau	No. 6	Nassau, NY	W 23–0		
September 19	at No. 10 Montgomery (MD)	No. 3	Rockville, MD	W 33–22		
September 26	Chowan	No. 1	Tate Field; Banner Elk, NC	W 15–7		
October 3	Hudson Valley	No. 1	Tate Field; Banner Elk, NC	W 14–9	1,500	
October 10	at Potomac State	No. 1	Keyser, WV	W 44–14		
October 24	at Chowan*	No. 1	Garrison Stadium; Murfeesboro, NC	W 18–0		
October 30	Mars Hill JV*	No. 1	Tate Field; Banner Elk, NC	W 56–13		
November 5	Appalachian State JV*	No. 1	Tate Field; Banner Elk, NC	W 45–6		
November 12	at Virginia Tech JV*	No. 1	Lane Stadium; Blacksburg, VA	W 37–0		
November 22	vs. No. 10 Grand Rapids*	No. 1	Johnson City, TN (East Bowl)	W 20–13		
*Non-conference game; Rankings from Coaches' Poll released prior to the game

== Rankings ==
Ranking movements Legend: ██ Increase in ranking ██ Decrease in ranking ( ) = First-place votes
	Week											
Poll	Pre	1	2	3	4	5	6	7	8	9	10	Final
NJCAA	4 (2)	6 (2)	3 (2)	1 (7)	1 (7)	1 (5)	1 (5)	1 (5)	1 (8)	1 (7)	1 (7)	2

== Personnel ==
=== Roster ===
1987 Lees–McRae Bobcats football team roster
Players
Coaches
Offense

Pos.	#	Name	Class
WR/TE	1	Ricky McCombs	So
WR/TE	2	Willie Ray Friday	So
QB	7	Jesse Davis	Fr
WR/TE	8	Terry Levine	Fr
QB	10	Kenneth Anderson	Fr
RB	11	Robbie Stuart	Fr
QB	13	Jim Friedl	Fr
QB	14	Robert Barnhill	So
QB	18	Chris Lawrence	Fr
WR/TE	20	James Lucas	Fr
RB	21	Wendell Belton	Fr
RB	23	Patrick White	Fr
WR/TE	24	Robert Brooks	Fr
RB	25	Tim Anderson	So
WR/TE	26	Michael McBride	So
RB	27	Russell Dean	Fr
RB	28	Randall Johnson	So
RB	32	Brad Welsh	Fr
RB	33	Robert Hardy	Fr
WR/TE	38	Michael Miller	So
RB	47	Anthony Knotts	Fr
OL	53	Troy Vasos	So
OL	54	Anthony Kellogg	Fr
OL	59	Todd Blackburn	Fr
OL	62	Hal Hamrick	Fr
OL	66	Sebastian Scott	Fr
OL	67	Mark Geoghagan	Fr
OL	68	Jim McDonald	So
OL	69	Michael Robert	So
OL	70	Dan Capell	Fr
OL	72	Brian Miller	Fr
OL	74	Rob Davis	So
OL	77	David Williams	Fr
OL	78	Bob Brumit	So
OL	79	Wesley Pope	So
WR/TE	82	Charles Whittenburg	Fr
WR/TE	83	Todd Goins	So
WR/TE	84	Tom O'Neill	Fr
WR/TE	85	Kenny Barnhill	Fr
WR/TE	86	Jamie Anderson	So
WR/TE	99	David Herring	So

Defense

Pos.	#	Name	Class
DB	3	Eric Simmons	So
DB	4	Anthony McCord	So
LB	5	Jay Jones	So
DB	13	Kevin Sherman	Fr
DB	16	Brian Sizemore	Fr
DB	19	Lynn Lindley	Fr
LB	22	Byron Bell	Fr
LB	29	Kevin Clarke	Fr
DL	30	Randy Norris	Fr
DB	34	Randy Stoudemire	Fr
DB	35	Everette Hood	Fr
LB	36	Drew Bowman	So
LB	37	Carl Francis	Fr
LB	38	Craig Reece	Fr
LB	39	Craig Drescher	So
LB	40	Tim Spain	Fr
DB	41	Leonard Wheeler	Fr
DL	42	Michael Whaley	So
LB	43	James Boyd	So
LB	44	Grady Ross	Fr
LB	45	Robert Rowls	Fr
DB	46	Craig Overton	Fr
LB	48	Tom Cross	Fr
DL	49	Danny Brown	Fr
DL	50	Vince Buczek	Fr
LB	50	Calvin Tiggle	Fr
LB	51	Steve Usina	So
LB	52	Damon Maer	Fr
LB	55	Anthony Armour	Fr
LB	56	Peter Zelch	So
DL	57	David Bower	So
DL	64	Jonathan Lewis	Fr
LB	65	Jay Redmond	Fr
DL	67	Jimmy Hill	So
DL	72	Jay Boyter	Fr
DL	73	Timmy Cochran	Fr
DL	75	Todd Swierski	Fr
DL	76	Ron Loflin	Fr
LB	76	Daryl Payton	Fr
LB	81	Chris Littleford	Fr
DL	92	Gerald Ross	So
DL	93	Dushon Lewis	Fr
DL	94	Jeff Jenkins	So
DL	95	Greg Tarte	Fr
DL	96	Joseph Stone	Fr
DL	97	Nick McCrary	Fr
DL	98	Donnie Ramey	Fr
DL	99	Victor Lester	Fr

Special teams

Pos.	#	Name	Class
PK/P	6	Jerry Jackson	So
PK/P	9	Todd Frashier	Fr
PK/P	17	Craig Browley	So
PK/P	32	James Del Thornton	So
PK/P	71	David Burnett	So

Head coach

- Mac Bryan

Coordinators/assistant coaches

- Norris Lightsey
  (Quarterbacks coach & running backs coach)
- Jim Lyons
  (Wide receivers coach & tight ends coach)
- Jamie Brown
  (Defensive line coach)
- Bill Wohlford
  (Linebackers coach)
- Joe Johnson
  (Defensive backs coach & kickers coach)

Legend

- (C) Team captain
- (S) Suspended
- (I) Ineligible
- Injured
- Redshirt

Roster
Last update: October 14, 2024
