= John Pate (American football) =

American football coach (born 1954)

Biographical details
- Born: April 6, 1954 (age 72); Aberdeen, Maryland, U.S.
- Education: North Georgia College (1976); Georgia Southern College (1987)

Playing career

Baseball
- 1973–1974: North Georgia

Coaching career (HC unless noted)

Football
- 1979: 3rd Infantry Division
- 1980–1981: Fort Benning (AHC/DC)
- 1982–1983: Georgia Southwestern (DC)
- 1984: Union (KY)
- 1985–1986: Georgia Southern (GA)
- 1987–1989: Georgia Southern (DL/RC)
- 1990: West Georgia (DC)
- 1991–1993: Lees–McRae
- 1994–1995: Sue Bennett
- 1996: Bulloch Academy (GA)
- 1997–2003: Georgia Southern (DL/RC)
- 2004–2005: Georgia Southern (assoc. HC/DL/RC)
- 2006–2008: West Laurens HS (GA)
- 2009–2010: West Montgomery HS (NC)
- 2011–2012: Hamline
- 2014: Eidsvoll 1814s
- 2015: Yulee HS (FL) (DC)
- 2016–2017: Fernandina Beach HS (FL)
- 2018–2022: Hilliard HS (FL)
- 2023: North Bay Haven Academy (FL)

Track and field
- 1982–1983: Georgia Southwestern

Administrative career (AD unless noted)
- 1994–1995: Sue Bennett
- 1996: Bulloch Academy (GA)

Head coaching record
- Overall: 7–68–1 (college football); 83–69–1 (high school football)

John Lloyd Pate (born April 6, 1954) is an American football coach. He served as the head football coach at Union College in Barbourville, Kentucky (1984), Lees–McRae College in Banner Elk, North Carolina (1991–1993), and Hamline University in St. Paul, Minnesota (2011–2012).

He was a part of five national championship staffs while serving as an assistant at Georgia Southern University.

== Head coaching record ==
=== College football ===
Year	Team	Overall	Conference	Standing	Bowl/playoffs
Union (Kentucky) Bulldogs (NAIA Division II independent) (1984)
1984	Union	1–6			
Union:		1–6			
Lees–McRae Bobcats (NCAA Division II independent) (1991–1993)
1991	Lees–McRae	1–9			
1992	Lees–McRae	1–9			
1993	Lees–McRae	3–6–1			
Lees–McRae:		5–24–1			
Sue Bennett Dragons (NAIA Division II independent) (1994–1995)
1994	Sue Bennett	0–8			
1995	Sue Bennett	0–11			
Sue Bennett:		0–19			
Hamline Pipers (Minnesota Intercollegiate Athletic Conference) (2011–2012)
2011	Hamline	0–10	0–8	9th	
2012	Hamline	1–9	0–8	9th	
Hamline:		1–19	0–16		
Total:		7–68–1			

=== High school football ===
Year	Team	Overall	Conference	Standing	Bowl/playoffs
Bulloch Academy Gators () (1996)
1996	Bulloch Academy	3–8	2–2		
Bulloch Academy:		3–8	2–2		
West Laurens Raiders () (2006–2008)
2006	West Laurens	5–5	1–4	5th	
2007	West Laurens	5–5	1–4	5th	
2008	West Laurens	4–6	1–5	6th	
West Laurens:		14–16	3–13		
West Montgomery Warriors () (2009–2010)
2009	West Montgomery	10–4	5–1	3rd	
2010	West Montgomery	7–6	4–3	3rd	
West Montgomery:		17–10	9–4		
Fernandina Beach Pirates () (2016–2017)
2016	Fernandina Beach	3–7	1–3	4th	
2017	Fernandina Beach	5–5–1	1–1	6th	
Fernandina Beach:		8–12–1	2–4		
Hilliard Red Flashes () (2018–2022)
2018	Hilliard	3–7	0–0	N/A	
2019	Hilliard	7–5	0–0	N/A	
2020	Hilliard	9–1	0–0	N/A	
2021	Hilliard	9–2	0–0	N/A	
2022	Hilliard	8–3	0–0	N/A	
Hilliard:		36–18	0–0		
North Bay Haven Academy Buccaneers () (2023)
2023	North Bay Haven Academy	5–5	0–3	4th	
North Bay Haven Academy:		5–5	0–3		
Total:		83–69–1			
