= Mac Bryan =

American football coach (born 1959)

Biographical details
- Born: December 29, 1959 (age 65); Traphill, North Carolina, U.S.

Playing career
- 1978–1980: Appalachian State
- Position(s): Offensive tackle

Coaching career (HC unless noted)
- 1981–1982: Appalachian State (GA)
- 1983: West Wilkes HS (NC)
- 1984–1985: Lees–McRae (OC/OL)
- 1986–1990: Lees–McRae
- 1991: Southern Miss (TE/OT)
- 1992–1993: Southern Miss (OL)
- 1994–1999: Boiling Springs HS (SC)
- 2000: Pikeville (AHC/OC)
- 2001: Chattanooga (OL)
- 2002: Chattanooga (DL)
- 2003: Chattanooga (AHC/DL)
- 2004: Newberry (AHC/OL)
- 2005: Emerald HS (SC)
- 2006–2008: Pikeville
- 2009: Enka HS (NC)
- 2010–2012: UT Martin (co-OC/OL)
- 2013–2017: Ooltewah HS (TN)
- 2018–2021: Avery County HS (NC)
- 2022: Lakeview Fort Oglethorpe HS (GA)

Administrative career (AD unless noted)
- 2005: Emerald HS (SC)

Head coaching record
- Overall: 10–22 (college); 44–9–1 (junior college); 93–109 (high school; excluding West Wilkes)
- Bowls: 2–3 (junior college)

Accomplishments and honors

Championships
- 3 CFC (1986–1988)

John Mac Bryan (born December 29, 1959) is an American football coach. He was the head football coach for West Wilkes High School in 1983, Lees–McRae College from 1986 to 1990, Boiling Springs High School from 1994 to 1999, Emerald High School in 2005, Pikeville College—now known as the University of Pikeville—from 2006 to 2008, Enka High School in 2009, Ooltewah High School from 2013 to 2017, Avery County High School from 2018 to 2021, and Lakeview Fort Oglethorpe High School in 2022. He also coached for Appalachian State, Southern Miss, Chattanooga, Newberry, and UT Martin.

== Head coaching record ==
=== College ===
Year	Team	Overall	Conference	Standing	Bowl/playoffs
Pikeville Bears (Mid-South Conference) (2006–2008)
2006	Pikeville	4–6	2–3	4th (East)	
2007	Pikeville	4–7	2–3	T–4th (East)	
2008	Pikeville	2–9	1–5	6th (East)	
Pikeville:		10–22	5–11		
Total:		10–22			

=== Junior college ===
Year	Team	Overall	Conference	Standing	Bowl/playoffs	NJCAA^{#}
Lees–McRae Bobcats (Coastal Football Conference) (1986–1990)
1986	Lees–McRae	9–1–1	5–0	1st	L East Bowl	4
1987	Lees–McRae	12–0	5–0	1st	W East Bowl	2
1988	Lees–McRae	9–2	4–1	T–1st	L Mid-America Bowl	7
1989	Lees–McRae	8–2	3–1	2nd	W East Bowl	
1990	Lees–McRae	6–4	2–3	4th	L East Bowl	
Lees–McRae:		44–9–1	19–5			
Total:		44–9–1				
National championship Conference title Conference division title or championship game berth

=== High school ===
Year	Team	Overall	Conference	Standing	Bowl/playoffs
West Wilkes Blackhawks (Blue Ridge Conference) (1983)
1983	West Wilkes				
West Wilkes:					
Boiling Springs Bulldogs () (1994–1999)
1994	Boiling Springs	5–7	2–5		
1995	Boiling Springs	3–8	2–5		
1996	Boiling Springs	8–5	2–4		
1997	Boiling Springs	2–10	0–6	7th	
1998	Boiling Springs	2–10	0–6	7th	
1999	Boiling Springs	4–8	1–5	6th	
Boiling Springs:		24–48	7–31		
Emerald Vikings () (2005)
2005	Emerald	11–3	4–1	2nd	
Emerald:		11–3	4–1		
Enka Jets () (2009)
2009	Enka	4–6	2–3	5th	
Enka:		4–6	2–3		
Ooltewah Owls () (2013–2017)
2013	Ooltewah	4–2	1–1	4th	
2014	Ooltewah	12–1	6–0	1st	
2015	Ooltewah	11–3	5–1	1st	
2016	Ooltewah	10–3	5–1	2nd	
2017	Ooltewah	5–6	3–3	4th	
Ooltewah:		42–15	20–6		
Avery County Vikings () (2018–2021)
2018	Avery County	2–9	1–4	5th	
2019	Avery County	5–7	1–4	5th	
2020	Avery County	2–3	1–3	5th	
2021	Avery County	1–10	1–5	6th	
Avery County:		10–29	4–16		
Lakeview Fort Oglethorpe Warriors () (2022)
2022	Lakeview Fort Oglethorpe	2–8	1–6	7th	
Lakeview Fort Oglethorpe:		2–8	1–6		
Total:					
National championship Conference title Conference division title or championship game berth
