= Klawiter =

Klawiter is a surname. Notable people with the surname include:

- Antoni Klawiter (1836–1913), Polish Catholic priest
- Jan Klawiter (born 1950), Polish politician
- Warren Klawiter (born c. 1943), American football coach
