= Soupy Campbell (American football) =

American football coach (1943–2024)

Biographical details
- Born: June 21, 1943; Johnson City, Tennessee, U.S.
- Died: June 6, 2024 (aged 80)
- Education: Lees–McRae College (1969); Mars Hill College; Winthrop College

Playing career
- 1967–1968: Lees–McRae
- 1969–1970: Mars Hill
- Position: Center

Coaching career (HC unless noted)
- 1971–1972: Lees–McRae (assistant)
- 1973: Tennessee Prep (TN)
- 1974–1977: Bennettsville HS (SC)
- 1978: Hoke County HS (NC) (assistant)
- 1979: Hoke County HS (NC)
- 1980–1985: Lees–McRae
- 1986–1988: Northwest Cabarrus HS (NC)

Administrative career (AD unless noted)
- 1973: Tennessee Prep (TN)
- 1988: Northwest Cabarrus HS (NC)

Head coaching record
- Overall: 30–27–2 (college); 27–60–2 (high school)

Clyde Frank "Soupy" Campbell III (June 21, 1943 – June 6, 2024) was an American college football coach. He was the head football coach for Tennessee Preparatory School in 1973, Bennettsville High School from 1974 to 1977, Hoke County High School in 1979, Lees–McRae College from 1980 to 1985. and Northwest Cabarrus High School from 1986 to 1988. He played college football for Lees–McRae and Mars Hill as a center.

== Head coaching record ==
=== College ===
Year	Team	Overall	Conference	Standing	Bowl/playoffs
Lees–McRae Bobcats (Coastal Football Conference) (1980–1985)
1980	Lees–McRae	7–3	3–3	5th	
1981	Lees–McRae	4–6	2–6	8th	
1982	Lees–McRae	6–3–1	3–2–1	3rd	
1983	Lees–McRae	2–7	1–5	8th	
1984	Lees–McRae	5–5	2–4	6th	
1985	Lees–McRae	6–3–1	3–2	3rd	
Lees–McRae:		30–27–2	14–22–1		
Total:		30–27–2			

=== High school ===
Year	Team	Overall	Conference	Standing	Bowl/playoffs
Tennessee Prep Busters () (1973)
1973	Tennessee Prep	3–6	2–2		
Tennessee Prep:		3–6	2–2		
Bennettsville Green Gremlins () (1974–1977)
1974	Bennettsville	1–9	0–5	6th	
1975	Bennettsville	2–7–1	0–3–1	5th	
1976	Bennettsville	0–10	0–5	6th	
1977	Bennettsville	3–6–1	0–5	6th	
Bennettsville:		6–32–2	0–18–1		
Hoke County Bucks () (1979)
1979	Hoke County	6–4			
Hoke County:		6–4			
Northwest Cabarrus Trojans () (1986–1988)
1986	Northwest Cabarrus	4–6		4th	
1987	Northwest Cabarrus	8–2	5–1	T–1st	
1988	Northwest Cabarrus	0–10	0–6	7th	
Northwest Cabarrus:		12–18			
Total:		27–60–2			
National championship Conference title Conference division title or championship game berth
