= Warren Klawiter =

American football coach (born c. 1943)

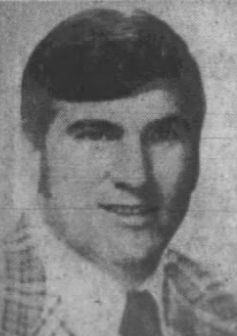
- Klawiter in 1975

Biographical details
- Born: c. 1943 (age 82–83); St. Louis, Missouri, U.S.
- Education: Kansas State University (1965); Southern Illinois University

Playing career
- 1961–1965: Kansas State
- Position: Offensive lineman

Coaching career (HC unless noted)
- 1966: Kansas State (freshmen OL)
- 1969: Southern Illinois (GA)
- 1970–1971: Southern Illinois (DL)
- 1972: Southern Illinois (JV/DL)
- 1973: East Carolina (DL)
- 1974: Virginia (DE)
- 1975: Lees–McRae
- 1976–1979: Catawba

Administrative career (AD unless noted)
- 1975: Lees–McRae

Head coaching record
- Overall: 18–24 (college); 7–3 (junior college)

Accomplishments and honors

Championships
- 1 CFC Southern Division (1975)

Awards
- SAC Coach of the Year (1976)

Warren D. Klawiter (born c. 1943) is an American former college football coach. He was the head football coach for Lees–McRae College in 1975 and Catawba College from 1976 to 1979. He also coached for Southern Illinois, East Carolina, and Virginia.

Klawiter served as athletic director for Lees–McRae during his lone year at the school.

== Head coaching record ==
=== College ===
Year	Team	Overall	Conference	Standing	Bowl/playoffs
Catawba Indians (South Atlantic Conference) (1976–1979)
1976	Catawba	8–3	5–2	2nd	
1977	Catawba	3–7	1–6	T–7th	
1978	Catawba	4–6	2–5	T–5th	
1979	Catawba	3–8	2–5	7th	
Catawba:		18–24	10–18		
Total:		18–24			

=== Junior college ===
Year	Team	Overall	Conference	Standing	Bowl/playoffs
Lees–McRae Bobcats (Coastal Football Conference) (1975)
1975	Lees–McRae	7–3	4–2	1st (Southern)	
Lees–McRae:		7–3	4–2		
Total:		7–3			
National championship Conference title Conference division title or championship game berth
