= Jamie Osborne =

Jamie Osborne may refer to:

- Jamie Osborne (jockey), English racehorse trainer and former jockey
- Jamie Osborne (rugby union), Irish rugby union player

== See also ==
- James Osborne (disambiguation)
