= Soupy Campbell =

Soupy Campbell may refer to:

- Soupy Campbell (American football), American college football coach
- Andrew Campbell (ice hockey), nicknamed Soupy
- Dan Campbell (singer), nicknamed Soupy
- Jerry Campbell, American football player, nicknamed Soupy
- Stefan Campbell, Gaelic footballer, nicknamed Soupy

== See also ==
- Soup Campbell, baseball player
