= James Osborne =

James Osborne may refer to:

- James Osborne (politician) (1845–1877), New South Wales parliamentarian
- James Osborne (VC) (1857–1928), English recipient of the Victoria Cross
- James Osborne (sport shooter), British field target shooter
- James T. A. Osborne, British painter, printmaker, etcher and engraver
- Jim Osborne (defensive tackle) (born 1949), former American football defensive tackle
- Jim Osborne (American football coach) (born c. 1943), American college football coach
- Jim Osborne (tennis) (born 1945), American tennis player
- Jimmy Osborne (died 2002), Australian association footballer
- Jamie Osborne (jockey) (born 1967), jockey and race horse trainer
- Jamie Osborne (rugby union), Irish rugby union player
- Jamey Osborne (born 1992), English footballer
