= Charlie Zimmerman (American football) =

American football coach (1904–1954)

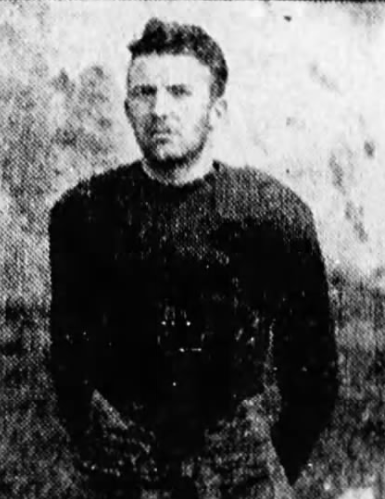
- Zimmerman with Wake Forest

Biographical details
- Born: April 13, 1904; Boone, North Carolina, U.S.
- Died: November 25, 1954 (aged 50); Seattle, Washington, U.S.

Playing career

Football
- 1925–1929: Wake Forest
- Position: Tackle

Coaching career (HC unless noted)

Football
- 1930–1931: Lees–McRae
- 1934: Appalachian State (line)

Basketball
- 1927–1928: Wake Forest (manager)
- 1930–1932: Lees–McRae

Administrative career (AD unless noted)
- 1930–1932: Lees–McRae

Head coaching record
- Overall: 5–8–3 (football)

Charles Tucker "Jew" Zimmerman (April 13, 1904 – November 25, 1954) was an American college athletics coach and administrator.

== Playing career ==
Zimmerman began playing football in 1920 at the Christ School. In 1922, he enrolled in Asheville High School and became a crucial member on the line. In 1925, he enrolled at Wake Forest and made the freshmen team and starred on the line. He was named as an all-state freshmen tackle. Over the next two years he was regularly in the rotation on the varsity line as a tackle. He dropped out in November 1928 with two games remaining on the season. After a couple of months away, he returned for his final season with the Demon Deacons.

In 1927, Zimmerman served as the manager for the basketball team.

== Coaching career ==
In 1930, Zimmerman was hired as the athletic director and head football and basketball coach for The Lees–McRae Institute—now known as Lees–McRae College. He succeeded Dick Flinn, who resigned after one season. Zimmerman chose to coach the athletics at Lees–McRae over returning to Wake Forest as an assistant to his former coach, Pat Miller. In Zimmerman's first season as football coach, he led the team to a 2–4–2 record, including a 7–7 tie to his former team, Asheville High School. He resigned from all posts in 1932.

In 1934, Zimmerman was hired as the line coach for Appalachian State under Eugene Garbee. He returned to coaching after practicing law in Boone, North Carolina.

== Personal life ==
On November 19, 1928, Zimmerman's mother died, causing him to withdraw from Wake Forest. In January 1929, he received his license to practice law in North Carolina.

Zimmerman served in the United States Navy during World War II and spent time as a court bailiff in Fresno, California. In June 1953 he suffered a fractured skull before dying on November 25, 1954, in Seattle. Prior to his death, he worked as a salesman while he studied law at the University of Washington School of Law.

He was the uncle of singer-songwriter Tucker Zimmerman.

== Head coaching record ==
=== Football ===
Year	Team	Overall	Conference	Standing	Bowl/playoffs
Lees–McRae Bulldogs (Independent) (1930–1931)
1930	Lees–McRae	2–4–2			
1931	Lees–McRae	3–4–1			
Lees–McRae:		5–8–3			
Total:		5–8–3			
