= Johnny Mackorell =

American football coach (1912–1980)

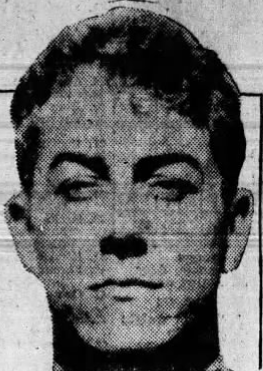
- Mackorell in 1934

No. 25
- Position: Halfback

Personal information
- Born: November 3, 1912; York, South Carolina, U.S.
- Died: April 28, 1980 (aged 67); Morganton, North Carolina, U.S.
- Listed height: 5 ft 10 in (1.78 m)
- Listed weight: 178 lb (81 kg)

Career information
- High school: Hickory (Hickory, North Carolina)
- College: Davidson (1931–1934)

Career history

Playing
- New York Giants (1935)

Coaching
- Lees–McRae (1936–1939) Head coach

Operations
- Lees–McRae (1936–1946) Athletic director

Awards and highlights
- Davidson Hall of Fame (1990); Little All-American (1934)

Head coaching record
- Career: 9–19–1 (.328)
- Stats at Pro Football Reference

John Campbell Mackorell (November 3, 1912 – April 28, 1980) was an American football player and junior college football coach. He was a halfback for the New York Giants of the National Football League (NFL) after being a Little All-American for Davidson College.

Mackorell was the head football coach and athletic director for Lees–McRae College in the 1930s and 1940s.

== Head coaching record ==
Year	Team	Overall	Conference	Standing	Bowl/playoffs
Lees–McRae Bulldogs / Bobcats (Independent) (1936–1939)
1936	Lees–McRae	2–5			
1937	Lees–McRae	3–4			
1938	Lees–McRae	1–5–1			
1939	Lees–McRae	3–5			
Lees–McRae:		9–19–1			
Total:		9–19–1			
