= Cox Mill High School =

American public school in North Carolina

Location
- 1355 Cox Mill Road; Concord, North Carolina 28027; United States; 35°23′42″N 80°43′49″W

Information
- School type: Public
- Established: 2009 (17 years ago)
- School district: Cabarrus County Schools
- CEEB code: 340302
- Principal: Meghan Frazier
- Teaching staff: 85.52 (FTE)
- Enrollment: 1,757 (2023-2024)
- Student to teacher ratio: 20.54
- Colors: Purple, teal, black
- Athletics: NCHSAA 7A
- Athletics conference: Greater Metro 6A/7A
- Nickname: Chargers
- Rival: Northwest Cabarrus, Jay M. Robinson, Hickory Ridge
- Website: https://cmhs.cabarrus.k12.nc.us/

Cox Mill High School is a comprehensive public high school in Concord, North Carolina.

== History ==
In 2006, Cabarrus County officials began looking for land in the western portion of the county for a high school that would alleviate the overcrowding at Northwest Cabarrus High School and Jay M. Robinson High School. Land was found in the burgeoning Cox Mill area of Concord, near the Odell Community, approximately three miles from the Mecklenburg County line.

On October 8, 2007, the name "Cox Mill High School" was chosen by the Cabarrus County Board of Education over other candidates including "Odell High School", "West Winds High School", and "Bernie Edwards High School" (in honor of the longtime Northwest Cabarrus football coach and Concord mayor). Cabarrus schools superintendent Harold Winkler's name was also considered by the board, but Winkler himself asked that it be removed from consideration.

Cox Mill opened with 9th through 11th grades on August 25, 2009, and graduated its first senior class on June 11, 2011.

== Notable alumni ==
- Rechon "Leaky" Black (2018) — NBA player
- Wendell Moore Jr. (2019) — NBA player
- Matt Morgan (2015) — professional basketball player
