= Fred I. Dickerson =

American football coach (1911–1917)

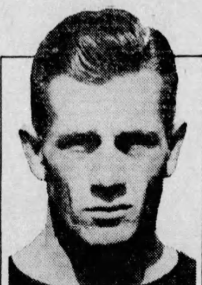
- Dickerson in 1933

Biographical details
- Born: May 6, 1911; Mars Hill, North Carolina, U.S.
- Died: August 21, 2017 (aged 106); Asheville, North Carolina, U.S.
- Education: The Lees–McRae Institute (1931); Davidson College (1933); Louisiana State University

Playing career

Football
- 1929–1930: Lees–McRae
- 1931–1932: Davidson

Basketball
- 1929–1930: Lees–McRae
- 1931–1932: Davidson

Track and field
- 1929–1930: Lees–McRae
- 1931–1932: Davidson
- Positions: Quarterback (football); Center (basketball); Broad jump (track and field)

Coaching career (HC unless noted)

Football
- 1933–1935: Lees–McRae
- 1936–1940: Mars Hill (assistant)
- 1941: Davis & Elkins
- 1946–1961: Lees–McRae

Basketball
- 1939–1940: Mars Hill
- 1946–1961: Lees–McRae

Track and field
- 1936–1940: Mars Hill
- 1941: Davis & Elkins
- 1946–1961: Lees–McRae

Administrative career (AD unless noted)
- 1933–1936: Lees–McRae
- 1946–1962: Lees–McRae

Head coaching record
- Overall: 1–10 (college football); 75–62–16 (junior college football)
- Bowls: 0–3

Accomplishments and honors

Championships
- Football; 3 NCJCC / CJCC (1948–1950); 6 WCJCC (1951, 1953–1956, 1960); Basketball; 3 WCC (1948–1949, 1951); 4 WJCAC (1952–1955); Track and field 2 WJCAC (1955, 1958)

Fred Irvin Dickerson Jr. (May 6, 1911 – August 21, 2017) was an American junior college football coach. He was the head football coach and athletic director for Lees–McRae College from 1933 to 1935 and from 1946 to 1961. He was also the head football coach for Davis & Elkins College in 1941 before enlisting in the military. He also coached for Mars Hill. He played college football, baseball, and track and field for Lees–McRae and Davidson.

Dickerson was awarded letters in football under head coach Dick Flinn while playing for Lees–McRae as a quarterback.

== Head coaching record ==
=== College football ===
Year	Team	Overall	Conference	Standing	Bowl/playoffs
Davis & Elkins Senators (West Virginia Intercollegiate Athletic Conference) (1941)
1941	Davis & Elkins	1–10	0–3	N/A (Note: Did not qualify for conference standings)	
Davis & Elkins:		1–10	0–3		
Total:		1–10			

=== Junior college football ===
Year	Team	Overall	Conference	Standing	Bowl/playoffs
Lees–McRae Bulldogs (North Carolina Junior College Conference) (1933–1935)
1933	Lees–McRae	5–3–2	3–2	T–3rd	
1934	Lees–McRae	3–6	2–2	4th	
1935	Lees–McRae	2–5–1	2–4–1	6th	
Lees–McRae Bobcats (North Carolina Junior College Conference / Carolinas Junior College Conference) (1946–1950)
1946	Lees–McRae	0–7–1	0–5–1	7th	
1947	Lees–McRae	2–5–2	1–3–2	6th	
1948	Lees–McRae	6–1–1	4–0–1	1st	
1949	Lees–McRae	9–2–1	4–0–1	1st	L Junior Sugar Bowl
1950	Lees–McRae	7–1–1	5–0	1st	L Golden Isles Bowl
Lees–McRae Bobcats (Western Carolinas Junior College Conference) (1951–1961)
1951	Lees–McRae	4–2	3–2	1st	
1952	Lees–McRae	3–3–1	3–3–1	3rd	
1953	Lees–McRae	8–2	7–2	1st	L Golden Isles Bowl
1954	Lees–McRae	5–0–3	4–0–2	1st	
1955	Lees–McRae	4–3–1	2–1–1	T–1st	
1956	Lees–McRae	4–3	2–2	T–1st	
1957	Lees–McRae	3–3–1	1–2–1	4th	
1958	Lees–McRae	1–5–2	1–4–1	4th	
1959	Lees–McRae	1–6–1	1–4–1	4th	
1960	Lees–McRae	7–1	6–0	1st	
1961	Lees–McRae	1–4–1	1–3–1	4th	
Lees–McRae:		75–62–16	51–38–12		
Total:		75–62–16			
National championship Conference title Conference division title or championship game berth
