= Elżbieta Rogala-Kończak =

Polish politician (1952–2024)

Mayor of Rumia
- In office 2002–2014
- Preceded by: Jan Klawiter
- Succeeded by: Michał Pasieczny

Personal details
- Born: 19 November 1952 Gdańsk, Poland
- Died: 23 February 2024 (aged 71)
- Party: Freedom Union

Elżbieta Jolanta Rogala-Kończak (19 November 1952 – 23 February 2024) was a Polish politician and engineer. She served as mayor of Rumia from 2002 to 2014, running on behalf of local committees.

== Biography ==
Rogala-Kończak graduated from the I Liceum Ogólnokształcące im. Mikołaja Kopernika w Gdańsku, then studied in electronics at the Gdańsk University of Technology. She worked at the Dior radio plant in Wałbrzych, then as a programmer at her alma mater. She ran her own business and was also employed by, among others, as an inspector at the Social Insurance Institution and a manager in a leasing fund.

Rogala-Kończak was an activist of the Freedom Union. In the 2001 elections, she unsuccessfully ran for a parliamentary seat from the party's list. In the 2002 local elections, she was elected mayor of Rumia, defeating Jan Klawiter, who was running for re-election. She retained this position also in the 2006 elections. In the 2010 elections, she secured election for a third term, running with the support of Civic Platform (PO) and winning for the first time in the first round. In the 2014 elections, in the second round, with 34.7% of the votes, she lost to Michał Pasieczny from PO.

== Personal life and death ==
Rogala-Kończak was married and had two sons. In 2004, she was awarded the Golden Cross of Merit. She died on 23 February 2024, at the age of 71.
