= George Litton =

American football player and coach

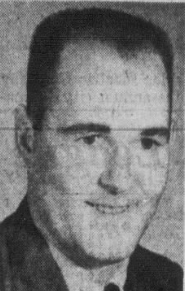
- Litton in 1962

Biographical details
- Born: c. 1935

Playing career
- 1955–1958: East Tennessee State
- Position: End

Coaching career (HC unless noted)
- 1959: Pennington Gap HS (VA)
- 1961: East Tennessee State (freshmen)
- 1962–1969: Lees–McRae
- 1970–1974: Gardner–Webb

Administrative career (AD unless noted)
- 1962–1970: Lees–McRae

Head coaching record
- Overall: 16–35 (college); 41–32–4 (junior college); 3–6–1 (high school)
- Bowls: 0–1 (college); 0–1 (junior college)
- Tournaments: 0–1 (NJCAA playoffs)

Accomplishments and honors

Championships
- 1 R10 (1967)

George Litton Jr. (born c. 1935) is an American former football coach. He served as the head football coach at Gardner–Webb University in Boiling Springs, North Carolina from 1970 to 1974, compiling a record of 16–35. Litton was also the head football coach at Lees–McRae College in Banner Elk, North Carolina from 1962 to 1969, when the school was a junior college.

A native of Big Stone Gap, Virginia, Litton played college football as an end at East Tennessee State College—now known as East Tennessee State University.

== Head coaching record ==
=== College ===
Year	Team	Overall	Conference	Standing	Bowl/playoffs
Gardner–Webb Runnin' Bulldogs (NAIA Division I independent) (1970–1974)
1970	Gardner–Webb	2–8			
1971	Gardner–Webb	3–7			
1972	Gardner–Webb	2–9			
1973	Gardner–Webb	7–5			L Poultry
1974	Gardner–Webb	2–6			
Gardner–Webb:		16–35			
Total:		16–35			

=== Junior college ===
Year	Team	Overall	Conference	Standing	Bowl/playoffs	NJCAA^{#}
Lees–McRae Bobcats (Western Carolinas Junior College Conference) (1962)
1962	Lees–McRae	2–7	1–3	4th		
Lees–McRae Bobcats (Region 10 Junior College Conference / Region 10 Conference) (1963–1969)
1963	Lees–McRae	2–6–1	1–5	4th		
1964	Lees–McRae	3–6	2–4	4th		
1965	Lees–McRae	5–5	1–4	4th		
1966	Lees–McRae	6–4	1–4	4th		
1967	Lees–McRae	8–1–1	5–0–1	1st	L Savannah Shrine Bowl	2
1968	Lees–McRae	8–2–1	3–1	2nd	L El Toro Bowl	10
1969	Lees–McRae	7–1–1	1–1	2nd		10
Lees–McRae:		41–32–4	15–22–2			
Total:		41–32–4				
National championship Conference title Conference division title or championship game berth
