= Bradley Pinion =

American football player (born 1994)

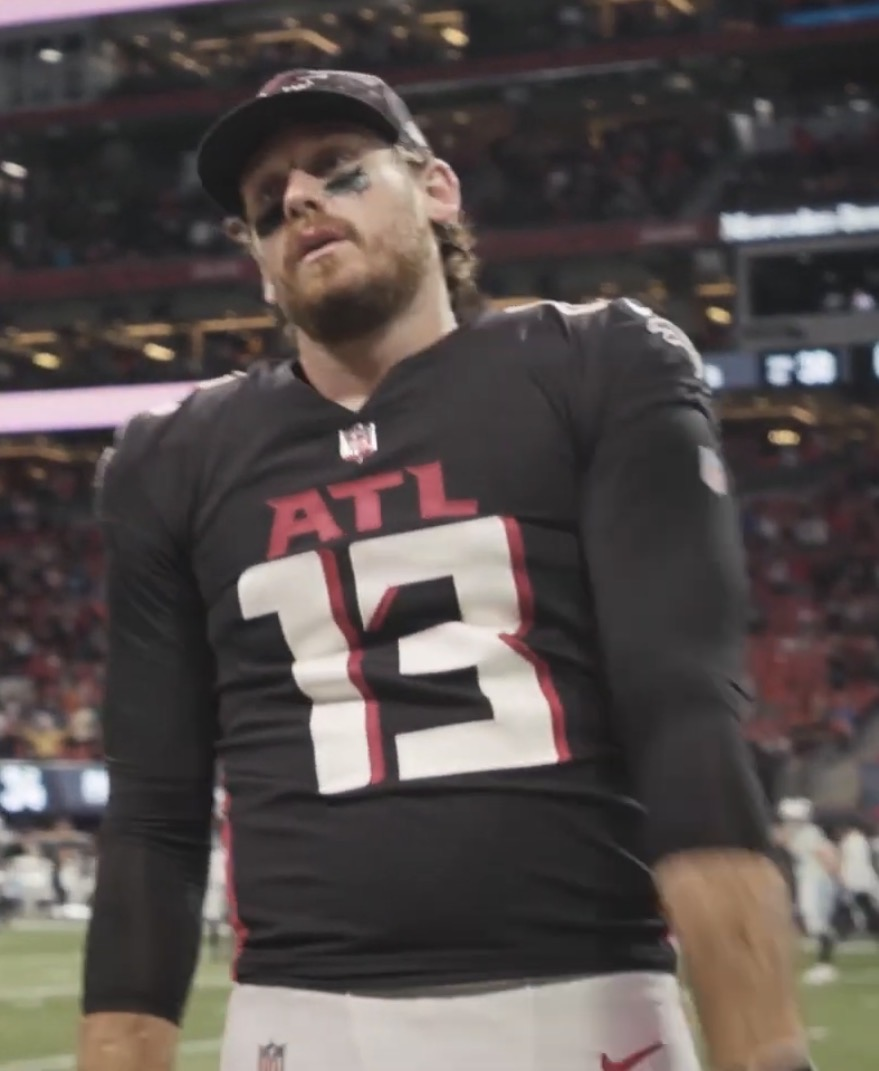
- Pinion with the Atlanta Falcons in 2022

No. 48 – Miami Dolphins
- Position: Punter
- Roster status: Active

Personal information
- Born: June 1, 1994 (age 32); Concord, North Carolina, U.S.
- Listed height: 6 ft 5 in (1.96 m)
- Listed weight: 250 lb (113 kg)

Career information
- High school: Northwest Cabarrus (Concord, North Carolina)
- College: Clemson (2012–2014)
- NFL draft: 2015: 5th round, 165th overall pick

Career history
- San Francisco 49ers (2015–2018); Tampa Bay Buccaneers (2019–2021); Atlanta Falcons (2022–2025); Miami Dolphins (2026–present)

Awards and highlights
- Super Bowl champion (LV)

Career NFL statistics as of Week 7, 2026
- Punts: 771
- Punting yards: 34,344
- Average punt: 44.5
- Longest punt: 73
- Inside 20: 278
- Stats at Pro Football Reference

Bradley Alexander Pinion (born June 1, 1994) is an American professional football punter and kickoff specialist for the Miami Dolphins of the National Football League (NFL). He played college football for the Clemson Tigers and was selected by the San Francisco 49ers in the fifth round of the 2015 NFL draft. Pinion has also played for the Tampa Bay Buccaneers and Atlanta Falcons.

== Early life ==
Pinion attended Northwest Cabarrus High School in Concord, North Carolina. He committed to Clemson University to play college football.

== College career ==
Pinion played college football at Clemson from 2012 to 2014 under head coach Dabo Swinney.

As a freshman in 2012, Pinion only appeared in five games with teammate Spencer Benton doing a majority of the work that season. On September 8, Pinion made his collegiate debut in the 52–27 win over Ball State. In the game, he had three punts for 117 yards (39.0 average). Overall, in the 2012 season, Pinion recorded nine punts for 355 yards (39.4 average).

As a sophomore in 2013, Pinion became the main punter for the Tigers. That season, he handled the punting duties for all but three attempts, which went to Ammon Lakip and Andy Teasdall. During the season opener against the Georgia Bulldogs, Pinion had a season-high seven punts for a season-high 287 yards (41.0 average). In the next game, against South Carolina State, he had four punts for 195 yards for a season-high 48.8 average. Overall, in the 2013 season, Pinion had 56 punts for 2,205 yards for a 39.4 average.

As a junior in 2014, Pinion continued his role as the main punter for the Tigers. That season, he handled all but one punt, which went to Andy Teasdall. Pinion attempted and converted three extra points on the season. During the season opener against the Georgia Bulldogs, Pinion had a season-high 10 punts for a season-high 451 yards (45.1 average). In two consecutive games in October, against Louisville and Boston College, he recorded games with 10 punts in each contest with 419 and 418 net punting yards respectively. On November 6, against Wake Forest, Pinion punted thrice for 147 net yards for a season-high 49.0 average. In his final collegiate game against the Oklahoma Sooners in the Russell Athletic Bowl, Pinion recorded five punts for 217 yards (43.4 average). Throughout his junior year, teammates referred to Pinion as "the steering column" for his remarkable control over the direction of his punts. Pinion elected to forgo his senior season and decided to enter the 2015 NFL draft.

== Professional career ==
Pre-draft measurables
Height	Weight	Arm length	Hand span	Wingspan	40-yard dash
6 ft 5 in (1.96 m)	229 lb (104 kg)	32 1/4 in (0.82 m)	10 1/8 in (0.26 m)	6 ft 6 3/4 in (2.00 m)	5.18 s
All values from NFL Combine

=== San Francisco 49ers ===
==== 2015 season ====
Pinion was selected by the San Francisco 49ers in the fifth round (165th overall) of the 2015 NFL draft. He was the only punter to be selected in the draft that year.

During the season-opening 20–3 over the Minnesota Vikings on Monday Night Football, Pinion punted thrice for 140 yards (46.67 average) in his NFL debut. During Week 7 against the Seattle Seahawks on Thursday Night Football, Pinion had a season-high nine punts for 390 yards (43.33 average) in the 20–3 loss. He tied his season-high nine punts in the next game against the St. Louis Rams, punting for 412 yards (45.78 average) during the 27–6 road loss. The following week the Atlanta Falcons, Pinion recorded five punts for 241 net yards for a season-high 48.20 average in the narrow 17–16 victory. During a Week 13 26–20 overtime road victory over the Chicago Bears, he had nine punts for a season-high 433 yards (48.11 average).

Pinion finished his rookie year with 91 punts for 3,969 yards for a 43.62 average.

==== 2016 season ====
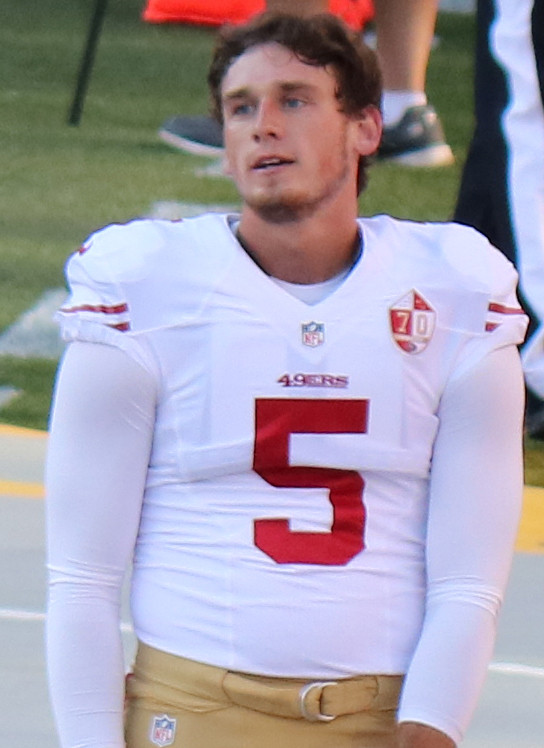
Pinion in 2016

Pinion began his second NFL season with very similar statistics in the first three games. During the season-opening 28–0 shutout victory over the Los Angeles Rams on Monday Night Football, he recorded seven punts for 319 yards (45.57 average). In the next game against the Carolina Panthers, Pinion had seven punts for 318 yards (45.43 average) during the 46–27 road loss. The following week against the Seattle Seahawks, he punted seven times for 319 yards in the 37–18 road loss.

During Week 5 against the Arizona Cardinals on Thursday Night Football, Pinion had seven punts for 349 yards for a season-high 49.86 average in the 33–21 loss. During a narrow Week 16 22–21 road victory over the Rams, Pinion recorded a season-high nine punts for a season-high 372 net yards (41.33 average).

Pinion finished his second professional season with 100 punts for 4,402 yards and a 44.02 average in 2016. His 100 punts led the league in attempts.

==== 2017 season ====
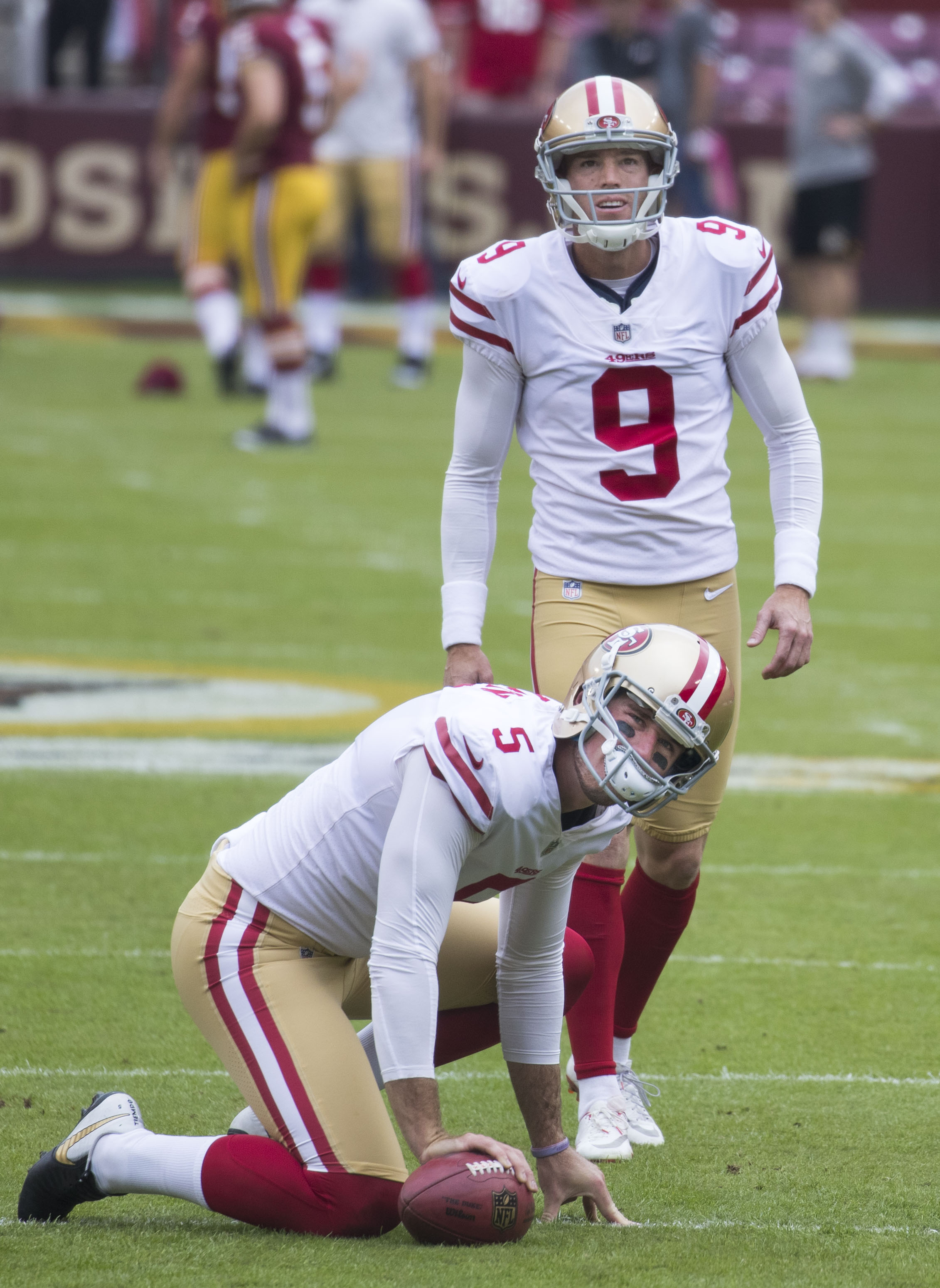
Pinion (#5) with Robbie Gould in 2017

Pinion remained as the 49ers' punter going into his third professional season. During a Week 4 18–15 overtime road loss to the Cardinals, he punted seven times for 351 yards for a season-high 50.14 average. During Week 8 against the Philadelphia Eagles, Pinion had eight punts for a season-high 364 yards (44.00 average) in the 33–10 road loss. During a Week 12 24–13 loss to the Seahawks, he recorded a season-high nine punts for 342 yards (38.00 average).

Pinion finished the 2017 season with a then career-low 75 punts for 3,255 yards for a 43.4 average.

==== 2018 season ====
During the season-opening 24–16 road loss to the Vikings, Pinion recorded four punts for 174 yards (43.5 average). During Week 8 against the Cardinals, he had a season-high seven punts for a season-high 285 yards (40.71 average) in the 18–15 road loss. In the next game against the Oakland Raiders on Thursday Night Football, Pinion punted thrice for 164 yards for a season-high 54.7 average, including a season-long 64-yard punt, during the 34–3 blowout victory. He was named NFC Special Teams Player of the Week for his performance against the Raiders.

Pinion finished the 2018 season with a then career-low 68 punts for 2,973 yards for a 43.7 average.

=== Tampa Bay Buccaneers ===
==== 2019 season ====
On March 13, 2019, Pinion signed a four-year, $11 million contract with the Tampa Bay Buccaneers.

Pinion made his Buccaneers debut during the season-opening 31–17 loss to his former team, the San Francisco 49ers, punting twice for 42 yards. In the next game against the Carolina Panthers on Thursday Night Football, Pinion recorded a season-high six punts for a season-high 295 yards and a season-high 49.17 average during the 20–14 road victory. Three weeks later against the New Orleans Saints, he had six punts for 263 yards (43.83 average) in the 31–24 road loss. In the next game against the Panthers in London, Pinion recorded similar statistics, tying his season-high of six punts for 267 yards (44.5 average) during the 37–26 loss.

Pinion finished the 2019 season with a then career-low 57 punts for 2,464 yards for a 43.23 average.

==== 2020 season ====
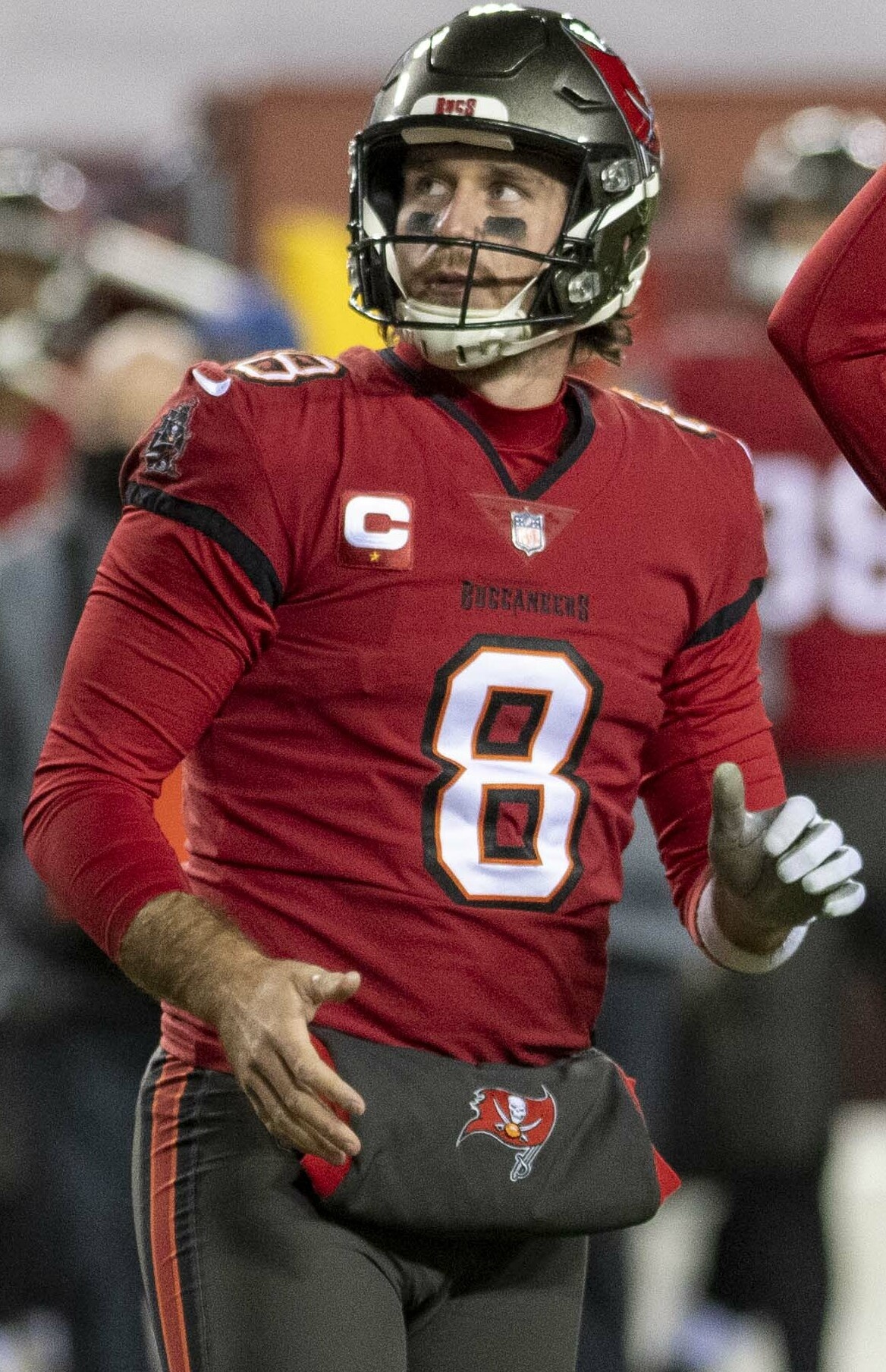
Pinion in January 2021

During the season-opening 34–23 road loss to the Saints, Pinion recorded a season-high five punts for 236 yards (47.2 average). Two weeks later against the Denver Broncos, he tied his season-high of five punts for 219 yards (43.80 average) in the 28–10 road victory. In the next game against the Los Angeles Chargers, Pinion punted thrice for 171 yards for a season-high 57.0 average during the 38–31 comeback victory.

During Week 6 against the Green Bay Packers, Pinion tied his season-high of five punts for 192 yards in the 38–10 victory. During a Week 11 27–24 loss to the Rams on Monday Night Football, Pinion tied his season-high of five punts again for a season-high 245 yards (49.0 average). He was placed on the reserve/COVID-19 list by the team on December 15, and was activated three days later. In his first game back, Pinion tied his season-high of five punts for 209 yards (41.80 yards) during a 31–27 comeback road victory over the Falcons.

Pinion finished the 2020 season with a then career-low 55 punts for 2,486 yards for a 45.2 average. The Buccaneers finished second in the NFC South with a 10–6 record and qualified for the playoffs. Pinion made his postseason debut during the Wild Card Round against the Washington Football Team, recording three punts for 127 yards (42.33 average) in the 31–23 road victory. In the Divisional Round against the Saints, he had four punts for 183 yards (45.75 average) during the 30–20 road victory. During the NFC Championship Game against the Packers, Pinion punted twice for 80 yards in the 31–26 road victory as the Buccaneers advanced to Super Bowl LV. In the Super Bowl against the Kansas City Chiefs, he recorded four punts for 150 yards (37.5 average) during the 31–9 victory.

==== 2021 season ====
During the narrow season-opening 31–29 victory over the Dallas Cowboys, Pinion recorded four punts for 197 yards and a season high 49.25 average, with three of them landing inside the 10-yard line (including a season-long 65 yarder). He was named NFC Special Teams Player of the Week for his performance. During a Week 15 9–0 shutout loss to the Saints, Pinion had a season-high eight punts for 336 yards.

Pinion finished the 2021 season with 56 punts for 2,378 yards for a 42.46 average. The Buccaneers finished atop the NFC South with a 13–4 record and qualified for the playoffs. During the Wild Card Round against the Philadelphia Eagles, Pinion had seven punts for 341 yards in the 31–15 victory. In the Divisional Round against the Rams, he recorded four punts for 212 yards during the 30–27 loss.

On June 22, 2022, Pinion was released by the Buccaneers.

=== Atlanta Falcons ===
==== 2022 season ====
On June 30, 2022, Pinion signed a one-year contract, $1.5 million with the Atlanta Falcons.

During a Week 3 27–23 road victory over the Seahawks, Pinion recorded a career-long 73-yard punt. Two weeks later against his former team, the Tampa Bay Buccaneers, Pinion had a season-high six punts for a season-high 290 yards (48.33 average) in the 21–15 road loss. He put up similar statistics during a Week 7 35–17 road loss to the Cincinnati Bengals, punting six times for 282 yards (47.0 average).

Pinion finished the 2022 season with 62 punts for 2,845 yards for a 42.46 average.

==== 2023 season ====
On March 13, 2023, Pinion signed a three-year, $8.65 million contract extension with the Falcons.

During the season-opening 24–10 victory over the Panthers, Pinion punted seven times for 337 yards (48.14 average). Two weeks later against the Detroit Lions, he recorded six punts for 295 yards (49.17 average) in the 20–6 road loss. In the next game against the Jacksonville Jaguars, Pinion had five punts for 271 yards and a season-high 54.2 average during the 23–7 road loss.

During Week 8 against the Tennessee Titans, Pinion punted six times for 305 yards (50.83 average) in the 27–23 road loss. During a Week 13 13–8 road victory over the New York Jets, he recorded a season-high nine punts for a season-high 433 yards (48.11 average). In the regular season finale against the Saints, Pinion had five punts for 254 yards (50.8 average) and a season-long 66-yard punt during the 48–17 road loss.

Pinion finished the 2023 season with 75 punts for 3,523 yards for a 46.97 average. He was named first team All-Pro by Pro Football Focus.

==== 2024 season ====
During the season-opening 18–10 loss to the Steelers, Pinion had four punts for 210 yards (52.5 average). Two weeks later against the Chiefs on Sunday Night Football, he punted thrice for 162 yards and a season-long 65-yard punt in the 22–17 loss. During a Week 15 15–9 road victory over the Las Vegas Raiders, Pinion recorded a season-high six punts for a season-high 265 yards.

Pinion finished the 2024 season with a career-low 47 punts for 2,209 yards for a career-high 47.00 average.

==== 2025 season ====
Pinion finished the 2025 season with 64 punts for 2,889 yards for a 45.1 average.

=== Miami Dolphins ===
On March 20, 2026, Pinion signed a one-year, $1.48 million contract with the Miami Dolphins.

== Career statistics ==
=== NFL ===
Legend
	Won the Super Bowl
	Led the league
**Bold**	Career high

==== Regular season ====
Year	Team	GP	Punting							
Year	Team	GP	Punts	Yds	Lng	Avg	Net Avg	Blk	Ins20	RetY
2015	SF	16	91	3,969	62	43.6	39.4	0	31	282
2016	SF	16	**100**	**4,402**	65	44.0	39.8	0	28	345
2017	SF	16	75	3,255	59	43.4	41.3	0	31	138
2018	SF	16	68	2,973	64	43.7	39.1	**1**	22	195
2019	TB	16	57	2,464	63	43.2	38.3	0	19	222
2020	TB	16	55	2,486	62	45.2	40.2	0	19	236
2021	TB	15	56	2,378	65	42.5	38.8	0	23	164
2022	ATL	**17**	62	2,845	**73**	45.9	41.2	0	23	250
2023	ATL	**17**	75	3,523	66	**47.0**	**41.5**	0	27	**353**
2024	ATL	**17**	47	2,209	65	**47.0**	38.7	0	14	305
2025	ATL	**17**	64	2,889	69	45.1	40.6	0	**34**	241
Career		179	750	33,393	73	44.5	40.0	1	271	2731

==== Postseason ====
Year	Team	GP	Punting					
Year	Team	GP	Punts	Yds	Avg	Blk	Lng	Ins20
2020	TB	**4**	**13**	540	41.5	0	53	0
2021	TB	2	11	**553**	**50.3**	0	**61**	**3**
Career		6	24	1,093	45.5	0	61	3

=== College ===
Season	Team	Conf	Class	Punting						
Season	Team	Conf	Class	Punts	Yds	Avg	XPM	XPA	XP%	Pts
2012	Clemson	ACC	FR	9	355	39.4	—	—	—	—
2013	Clemson	ACC	SO	56	2,205	39.4	—	—	—	—
2014	Clemson	ACC	JR	75	3,194	42.6	3	3	100.0	3
Career				140	5,754	41.1	3	3	100.0	3

== Personal life ==
Pinion is married to Kaeleigh Pinion. He is a Christian.

Pinion is also a supporter of Compassion International.
