= Jim Osborne (American football coach) =

American football coach (born c. 1943)

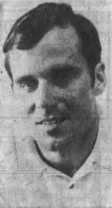
- Osborne in 1971

Biographical details
- Born: c. 1943 (age 82–83); Millersburg, Kentucky, U.S.
- Education: Morehead State College / University (1964, 1969)

Playing career
- 1961–1964: Morehead State
- 1965: New York Giants*
- Position: Guard

Coaching career (HC unless noted)
- 1965: Bourbon County HS (KY) (assistant)
- 1966–1968: Trinity HS (KY) (DC)
- 1969: Lees–McRae (DC)
- 1970: Lees–McRae
- 1971–1973: East Tennessee State (DL)

Head coaching record
- Overall: 6–4

James B. Osborne (born c. 1943) is an American college football coach. He was the head football coach for Lees–McRae College in 1970. He also coached for Bourbon County High School, Trinity High School, and East Tennessee State. He played for Morehead State and the New York Giants of the National Football League (NFL) as a guard.

== Head coaching record ==
Year	Team	Overall	Conference	Standing	Bowl/playoffs
Lees–McRae Bobcats (Coastal Football Conference) (1970)
1970	Lees–McRae	6–4	2–4	5th	
Lees–McRae:		6–4	2–4		
Total:		6–4			
