= Odell School, North Carolina =

- Unincorporated community
- Location within the U.S. state of North Carolina
- Coordinates: 35°28′0″N 80°43′2″W
- Country: United States
- State: North Carolina
- County: Cabarrus
- Elevation: 704 ft (215 m)
- Time zone: UTC-5 (Eastern (EST))
  - Summer (DST): UTC-4 (EDT)
- ZIP code: 28027
- Area code: 704

Odell School is an unincorporated community in northwestern Cabarrus County, North Carolina, United States, named for W. R. Odell Elementary School, a part of the Cabarrus County Schools system. It lies between Huntersville and Concord.

The school is for grades 3-5. The school year typically begins in August and ends in June.

== History ==
=== Prior names ===
The oldest name for this community on record was the name given to the township, Deweese, in the mid-19th century. This was the family name of one of the land owners in the community, whose name was also given to the community schoolhouse. The land on which the schoolhouse was located is now occupied by Gilwood Presbyterian Church.

Other colloquial names for the community which originated near the turn of the 20th century included Gandersburg and Pinchgut. Gandersburg stemmed from a community sport where a live goose was tied head-down in a large tree behind the Will Johnson General Store and horseback riders would attempt to snatch the head from the goose while going at full gallop. Pinchgut referred to the hard times the community went through during Civil War Reconstruction.

=== Roads ===
The main road through the community was originally known as Statesville Road, which occupied portions of the current North Carolina Highway 3, Odell School Road, Bradford Road, Macedonia Church Road and North Carolina Highway 73 on its route between Mooresville and Concord.

In 1929, the state built a paved, two-lane road through the area. The road was originally signed as North Carolina Highway 74. In 1935, U.S. Route 74 was built through North Carolina, and the state highway was re-signed as North Carolina Highway 73, more commonly as Davidson-Concord Highway. With the completion of this highway, the antiquated bridge on the Statesville Road over Coddle Creek was demolished, and the lower end of Statesville Road was re-routed to link to Poplar Tent Road and Derita Road, crossing Highway 73 and forming what is now considered the center of the Odell School community. This road is currently known as Odell School Road.

In the late 19th century, the mill village of Kannapolis was founded in northern Cabarrus County, and a road was extended from Baker's Creek in that village to join with the Statesville Road just west of Coddle Creek. This road was known for many years as Mooresville Road, then Mooresville-Kannapolis Highway. It now forms a major part of Dale Earnhardt Boulevard, or North Carolina Highway 3.

== Churches ==
=== Gilwood Presbyterian Church ===
The founding of this church occurred in November 1889 on the Deweese Schoolhouse property donated to the church by Isaiah Deweese. The first sanctuary was erected in the 1890s, and a fellowship building, "The Hut" was built in the 1920s. The sanctuary was expanded by adding Sunday School rooms and was brick veneered in the 1930s.

By the middle of the 20th century, plans were being made for reconstruction of the church facilities. An educational wing was built in 1963. This was followed by a new sanctuary, connected to the educational wing, in 1969. The former sanctuary was demolished soon after. A greatly expanded fellowship hall and ministry center was built, replacing "The Hut" in the 1990s. The latest project, remodeling and expansion of the church sanctuary, was finished in 2004.

Founded as a congregation in the Presbyterian Church in the United States, or Southern Presbyterian denomination, a 1980s merger brought it into the fold of the Presbyterian Church (USA).

=== Shiloh United Methodist Church ===
This church was founded in the late 19th century as a congregation of the Methodist Episcopal Church, South. Through the process of mergers, the congregation is now a part of the United Methodist Church.

The original sanctuary was constructed on Odell School Road just south of Shiloh Church Road, and was a frame structure, outfitted with an open steeple and three bells. Despite the name, this church was never located on Shiloh Church Road, but rather to the south of it.

In the 1930s, the sanctuary was remodeled and the steeple enclosed to a more traditional design. An educational wing and fellowship hall were constructed in the 1960s, and the sanctuary was replaced with a brick structure in the 1990s.

The original sanctuary building still exists, having been moved to a site on Shiloh Church Road and converted to a private residence.

=== Odell Baptist Church ===
Founded as a daughter church of Concord First Baptist Church, the Pastorium (parsonage) and the original sanctuary of the church was constructed in the early 1960s. Other buildings for the church were constructed later in the 20th century, with the original building being converted to an educational center and the Pastorium being converted to church offices.

This church is located east of the Coddle Creek Reservoir on North Carolina Highway 73. Odell Baptist Church is a constituent church of the Southern Baptist Convention.

=== Cedar Grove Presbyterian Church ===
This church congregation was begun following the Civil War, when African-American members of Poplar Tent Presbyterian Church decided to form their own congregation. Their original sanctuary was a frame structure built off of Odell School Road.

This building served the congregation for nearly a century, being replaced with a brick structure in the late 1960s. For most of its history, Cedar Grove Presbyterian Church has shared a pastor with nearby Bethpage Presbyterian Church, Concord.

Founded as a congregation of the United Presbyterian Church in the U.S.A., denominational merger has brought them into the fold of the Presbyterian Church (USA).

== Schools ==
=== Deweese/Gilwood School ===
The founding of Gilwood Presbyterian Church in 1889 led to the renaming of the community school building to Gilwood School and its relocation to a building behind the former Will Johnson General Store at the corner of Statesville Road and Mason Goodman Road (now called Windy Road).

=== Odell High School ===
In 1929, W. R. Odell School was built on the corner tract of land formed by the newly routed highways. The school was named for the founder of Odell Mill, the first textile mill in Cabarrus County. Odell School consolidated community schools at Gilwood, Bethpage, Poplar Tent and Macedonia, and initially offered eleven grades of instruction in one location. The school was expanded to twelve grades in the 1940s, and remained the community's only school and namesake until further school consolidations began in the late 20th century.

=== County consolidation and new facilities ===
Grades 9 through 12 were moved to Northwest Cabarrus High School in 1966, and grades 6 through 8 to Northwest Cabarrus Middle School in 1988. A replacement school on Moss Farm Road (off Harris Road) was constructed, and Kindergarten and elementary grades began the 2007–2008 school year in the new facility. Beginning with the 2009–2010 school year, high school students in grades 9, 10 and 11 began attending the newly constructed Cox Mill High School, located on the southern edge of the Odell School community. 12th grade continued to attend Northwest Cabarrus High School to graduate in 2010, and in the fall of 2010 Cox Mill expanded to a full four-grade high school. In 2016, Odell School was reconstructed on its original property, and reopened as a school for grades 3-5 by the name of W.R. Odell Elementary School, moving students in these grades from the now-renamed W.R. Odell Primary School on Moss Farm Road.

== Odell Volunteer Fire Department ==
Organized in 1961, the department's "trial by fire" came on a winter night in 1963, when the gymnasium of the former Odell High School burned down. Though the gym was a total loss, the department was able to save the adjoining school buildings from destruction.

The Odell Volunteer Fire Department is housed in a modern facility on Highway 73, and has expanded to provide First Responder service for the area. Most of the firefighters are trained as Emergency Medical Technicians. The department serves as backup and assistance to the Concord (NC) Fire Department for emergency calls to Concord Regional Airport.

In 2010, Odell Volunteer Fire Department built its first substation, a five-bay facility on Shiloh Church Road. The station was designed to function as a fully stand-alone fire department, in anticipation of future annexation in the area by Concord, Kannapolis and/or Davidson.

== Nightingale Nursing Home ==
This nursing facility was founded in the early 1960s by Mrs. Bertha Hartsell and Mrs. Florence Furr, neighbors and residents of the Odell School Community. Initially an Intermediate Care Facility, by the 1970s the facility had upgraded to Skilled Nursing Facility status.

In the late 70s, sale of the facility resulted in a name change to Brian Center-Odell, although the facility remained privately owned by one of the officers of the Brian Center Corporation. A later split with the corporation resulted in a name change to Odell Nursing Center.

A major expansion in the 1980s doubled the number of beds in the facility, and was followed by a sale in 1990 to Kentucky-based Cardinal Health Care. In 1995, Cardinal built a new facility near Kannapolis, North Carolina and transferred the nursing services out of the Odell School community.

The buildings are currently abandoned, as the owners of the property seek further development options.

== Community stores ==
=== Johnson's General Store ===
Johnson's General Store was owned and operated by several generations of the Johnson family, beginning in the mid-19th century, and was located at the intersection of the current Odell School Road and Windy Road. It was long recognized as a community gathering place, and as automobiles began to be owned by community residents, the store became a dealer of Standard Oil, Esso and finally Exxon gasoline and petroleum products.

Through the early part of the 20th century, William Johnson owned the store. By the 1940s, the store had become a stop along rural bus routes and a convenient meeting point for local farmers transporting cotton and tobacco to larger markets in Concord and Charlotte. Electricity and telephone service, when first introduced to the area, were often discussed and arranged from the store, reinforcing its role as a hub of commerce in the countryside region. His brother, Thomas Johnson assumed ownership in the late 1950s until the store closed in 1978, The building still stands, and is currently used as a residence.

=== Odell Grocery history ===
Closer to the center of the Odell School community, the Hartsell Store was founded in 1920 near the corner of present-day Odell School Road and Lockwood Road. When Highway 73 was routed through the community, the Hartsell family moved the store to the corner of the highway across from Odell School. There, they transformed it into a full-service gasoline station.

In the mid-1950s, The Hartsell family sold the service station to W. A. (Dub) Irvin, and as Irvin's Service Station it served motorists passing through the community for over 30 years. Irvin retired and after renting the store for several years he sold it to Carl Overcash, another longtime Odell School community resident, and the name changed to Carl's General Store. Following the death of owner Ronald Overcash in 2010, the store was sold and became known as Odell Grocery. Over the years, the service station has sold Gulf Oil, Union 76 and Phillips 66 gasoline and petroleum products and currently sells Marathon branded fuel.

== Tulin telephone exchange ==
Odell Community once had its own telephone exchange, independent of the Bell System. The system was operated by the Johnson Family, who ran it from their boarding house on what is now Odell School Road. The system was built in the years following World War I from surplus electrical equipment and telephone poles harvested from land in the community. At its peak, some 50 families and 5 businesses were on the exchange, which took its "company" name from the nickname of Mrs. Johnson, who served as operator.

The "Tulin" exchange served to link widely separated farm families of the day, and connect them with medical, law enforcement and other vital services in the community. One long-distance telephone line . . . to the county seat of Concord (NC) . . . was available to the exchange. Individual telephone numbers were identified by the exchange name, followed by the number of "long" rings followed by the number of "short" rings. For example, someone with the telephone number "Tulin 24" would know that they had a call when the telephone rang with two long rings and four short ones.

Telephone service on the "Tulin" exchange ended in 1942, when the lines were taken down and the telephones scrapped for salvage metals to aid the fighting of World War II. For the next decade, telephone service to the Odell School community was limited to two lines to Concord . . . one at Odell High School and the other at Johnson's General Store. By 1952, The Concord Telephone Company began to connect the community to both Concord and Kannapolis with rotary-dial telephone service.

== Location ==
The Cabarrus County seat of Concord is located some 11 miles east of Odell School. To the west lie the North Mecklenburg towns of Huntersville and Davidson, located on the eastern bank of Lake Norman. The community consists of a volunteer fire department, gas station, elementary school, and 1,100 residences.
