= Kevin Sherman =

American football coach (born 1968)

Current position
- Title: Head coach
- Team: Ferrum
- Conference: Carolinas
- Record: 9–12

Biographical details
- Born: November 2, 1968 (age 57); Radford, Virginia, U.S.
- Education: Ferrum College (1992)

Playing career
- 1987: Lees–McRae
- 1988–1990: Ferrum
- Position: Defensive back

Coaching career (HC unless noted)
- 1991: Ferrum (assistant)
- 1992: Methodist (WR)
- 1993: VMI (RB)
- 1994: VMI (WR)
- 1995: VMI (QB)
- 1996: VMI (WR)
- 1997–2000: Ohio (WR)
- 2001–2005: Wake Forest (WR)
- 2004: Denver Broncos (intern)
- 2006–2012: Virginia Tech (WR)
- 2013–2014: Purdue (WR)
- 2015–2018: Pittsburgh (WR)
- 2019–2020: Toledo (OQC)
- 2021: Murray State (AHC/WR)
- 2022–2023: Buffalo (WR)
- 2024–present: Ferrum

Head coaching record
- Overall: 9–12

Accomplishments and honors

Awards
- Ferrum Hall of Fame (2012)

Kevin S. Sherman (born November 2, 1968) is an American football coach. He is the head football coach for Ferrum College, a position he has held since 2024. He also coached for Methodist, VMI, Ohio, Wake Forest, Virginia Tech, Purdue, Pittsburgh, Toledo, Murray State, Buffalo, and the Denver Broncos of the National Football League (NFL). He played college football for Ferrum.

== Head coaching record ==
| Year | Team | Overall | Conference | Standing | Bowl/playoffs |
|---|---|---|---|---|---|
Ferrum Panthers (Old Dominion Athletic Conference) (2024)
| 2024 | Ferrum | 5–5 | 3–4 | T–5th | |
Ferrum Panthers (Conference Carolinas) (2025–present)
| 2025 | Ferrum | 4–7 | 3–3 | T–3rd | |
| Ferrum: | | 9–12 | 6–7 | | |
| Total: | | 9–12 | | | |
