= Jerry Kirk =

American football player and coach (born 1938)

Biographical details
- Born: February 21, 1938 (age 88)

Playing career
- 1961–1962: East Tennessee State

Coaching career (HC unless noted)
- 1967: Lees–McRae (line)
- 1968–1971: Ferrum (assistant)
- 1972–1975: NC State (DL)
- 1976: New York Jets (RB)
- 1977: Clemson (DL)
- 1978: Emory and Henry

Administrative career (AD unless noted)
- 1978: Emory and Henry

Head coaching record
- Overall: 2–7

Jerry Kirk (born February 21, 1938) is an American former college football coach and athletic director. He was the head football coach and athletic director at Emory & Henry College 1978, compiling a record of 2–7. He also coached for Lees–McRae, Ferrum, NC State, Clemson, and the New York Jets of the National Football League (NFL).

== Head coaching record ==
Year	Team	Overall	Conference	Standing	Bowl/playoffs
Emory and Henry Wasps (Old Dominion Athletic Conference) (1978)
1978	Emory and Henry	2–7	2–2	T–2nd	
Emory and Henry:		2–7	2–2		
Total:		2–7			
