= Avery County Schools =

School district in North Carolina, United States

Location
- Avery County, North Carolina United States

District information
- Type: Public
- Grades: PK–12
- Superintendent: (vacant)
- Accreditations: Southern Association of Colleges and Schools
- Schools: 8
- Budget: $24,845,000
- NCES District ID: 3700300

Students and staff
- Students: ~1,800
- Teachers: 165.50 (on FTE basis)
- Staff: 800 (on FTE basis)
- Student–teacher ratio: 13.53:1

Other information
- Website: www.averyschools.net

Avery County Schools is a PK–12 graded school district serving Avery County, North Carolina, United States. Its eight schools served 2,239 students in the 2010–2011 school year.

== History ==
Before the creation of Avery County in 1911, education was handled by Caldwell, Mitchell, and Watauga counties, from which Avery was formed.

The school district has grown to become the second largest employer in Avery County.

== Student demographics ==
For the 2010–2011 school year, Avery County Schools had a total population of 2,239 students and 165.50 teachers on a FTE basis. This produced a student-teacher ratio of 13.53:1. Of the student total, the sex ratio was 50% male to 50% female. The demographic group make-up was: White, 91%; Hispanic, 8%; Black, 0%; American Indian, 0%; and Asian/Pacific Islander, 0% (two or more races: 1%). For the same school year, 62.08% of the students received free and reduced-cost lunches.

== Governance ==
The primary governing body of Avery County Schools follows a council–manager government format with a five-member Board of Education appointing a Superintendent to run the day-to-day operations of the system. The school system is currently located in the North Carolina State Board of Education's Seventh District.

=== Board of education ===
The five members of the Board of Education meet on the first Tuesday of each month. The current members of the Board are Pat Edwards (Chair), Linda Webb (Vice-Chair), Randy Singleton, Michelle Burnop and David Wright.

Prior to the current members were John Greene and Kathy Aldridge

=== Superintendent ===
The position of superintendent is currently vacant. The previous superintendent, Dan Brigman, resigned the position on October 31, 2024 in the midst the school system navigating the operations of the school in the wake of Hurricane Helene.

== Member schools ==
Avery County Schools has eight schools ranging from pre-kindergarten to twelfth grade. They are one high school, two middle schools and five elementary schools.

=== High schools ===
- Avery County High School (Newland)

=== Middle schools ===
- Avery Middle School (Newland)
- Cranberry Middle School (Cranberry)

=== Elementary schools ===
- Banner Elk Elementary School (Banner Elk)
- Crossnore Elementary School (Crossnore)
- Freedom Trail Elementary School (Elk Park)
- Newland Elementary School (Newland)
- Riverside Elementary School (Newland)

== See also ==
- List of school districts in North Carolina
