= Bulloch Academy =

PK–12 school in Bulloch County, Georgia, United States

Location
- 873 Westside Rd; Statesboro, Georgia 30458 (Note: Mailing address; the school is located outside of the city limits.); United States; 32°26′54″N 81°48′48″W

Information
- Type: Private school
- Established: 1971 (55 years ago)
- CEEB code: 112803
- Head of school: Leisa Houghton
- Teaching staff: 43.9 (on an FTE basis)
- Grades: Pre-K–12
- Enrollment: 774 (2024-25)
- Student to teacher ratio: 16.2
- Colors: Green, gold
- Athletics: Class AAA/AAAA – Archery, Baseball, Basketball, Cheer, Cross Country, Football, Golf, Shotgun, Soccer, Softball, Tennis, Track, Wrestling
- Athletics conference: Georgia Independent Athletic Association (GIAA) giaasports.org
- Mascot: Gator
- Website: bullochacademy.com

Bulloch Academy is an independent, grades PK–12 school that was founded as a segregation academy. It is located in unincorporated Bulloch County, Georgia, approximately two miles (3.2 km) west of downtown Statesboro.

== History ==
Bulloch Academy was founded in 1971 as a segregation academy in order to continue providing access to white-only education in the Statesboro, Georgia area after federally mandated integration was enacted.

In 1969, the Justice Department filed a desegregation lawsuit in Georgia — United States v. Board of Education of Bulloch County (C.A. No. 462, S.D. Ga.) — charging violations of Section 407(a) of the Civil Rights Act of 1964. In his 1970 decision, District Court Judge Alexander Lawrence found the positions of both the Justice Department and the Bulloch County schools unsatisfactory, and issued his own desegregation plan to be implemented during the 1971–72 school year. Bulloch Academy was chartered in August 1971. The school was initially open for grades first through sixth.

== Accreditation ==
Bulloch Academy is accredited by the Southern Association of Independent Schools (SAIS), the Southern Association of Colleges and Schools (SACS), the Georgia Accrediting Commission, and Cognia.

== Campus Life ==
Bulloch Academy serves 700+ students and houses pre-kindergarten through 12th grade in two buildings: the Lower School (grades PK-6) and the Upper School (grades 7-12).

=== Athletics ===
Bulloch Academy is a Class AAA/AAAA member of the Georgia Independent Athletic Association (GIAA), an ancillary division of the Georgia Independent School Association (GISA). Sports offered include archery, baseball, basketball, cheer, cross country, football, golf, shotgun, soccer, softball, tennis, track, and wrestling.

=== Clubs & Organizations ===
- Art Club
- Chess Club
- Christian Life Program (CLP)
- Fellowship of Christian Athletes
- Georgia Center for Civic Engagement (CGCE)
- Key Club
- Literary
- Math Team
- National Honor Society (NHS)
- One Act
- Student Council
- Science Club
- Wildlife Club
- Yearbook

== Facilities ==
Bulloch Academy's campus features the Cornerstone Building, a lower school building, an upper school building, the Howard Gym, Legacy Gym, Gator Stadium (football and track), multipurpose fields, baseball field, softball field, tennis courts, cross country course, wrestling gym, and a quad.

== Demographics ==
As of the 2023–2024 school year, the student population was 89% white, 5% asian, 3% black, and 1% hispanic; the school district in which it resides is estimated to be 29% black.
