= James Osborne (sport shooter) =

British sport shooter

James Osborne is a Field Target shooter from Shepshed, United Kingdom. He has been competing in amateur competitions since 1991. In October 2006 he won the world championship title in Poland, scoring 143 out of 150 points. In 2005 he was runner-up in the same competition. Besides shooting, Osborne also works for the National Health Service, where he is a technician in the radiotherapy department at the City Hospital in Nottingham.
