= Lees–McRae Bobcats football =

College football team

- First season: 1929; 97 years ago
- Last season: 1993; 33 years ago
- Athletic director: Marty Favret
- Head coach: John Pate; 3rd season, 4–21–1 (.173)
- Location: Banner Elk, North Carolina
- NCAA division: Division II
- Conference: Independent
- All-time record: 268–228–30 (.538)
- Bowl record: 2–7 (.222)

Conference championships
- 2 CFC (1987, 1988); 1 R10 (1967); 6 WCJCC (1951, 1953, 1954, 1955, 1956, 1960); 3 NJCC / CJCC (1948, 1949, 1950)

Conference division championships
- 1 CFC Southern Division (1975)
- Colors: Forest green and gold
- Mascot: Bobcats

The Lees–McRae Bobcats football team represented Lees–McRae College in college football at the NCAA Division II level. The Bobcats were independents after transitioning to a four-year college, from 1991–1993. The program shut down following the 1993 season.

== Conference affiliations ==
- Independent (1929–1931)
- North Carolina Junior College Conference (1932–1935)
- Independent (1936–1939)
- North Carolina Junior College Conference / Carolinas Junior College Conference (1946–1950)
- Western Carolina Junior College Conference (1951–1962)
- Region 10 Junior College Conference / Region 10 Conference (1963–1969)
- Coastal Football Conference (1971–1990)
- NCAA Division II independent (1991–1993)

== Championships ==
=== Conference championships ===
Lees–McRae claims twelve conference titles, the last of which came in 1988.

Year	Conference	Overall record	Conference record	Coach
1948	North Carolina Junior College Conference / Carolinas Junior College Conference	6–1–1	4–0–1	Fred I. Dickerson
1949	North Carolina Junior College Conference / Carolinas Junior College Conference	9–2–1	5–0	Fred I. Dickerson
1950	North Carolina Junior College Conference / Carolinas Junior College Conference	7–1–1	5–0	Fred I. Dickerson
1951	Western Carolina Junior College Conference	4–2	3–2	Fred I. Dickerson
1953	Western Carolina Junior College Conference	8–2	5–1	Fred I. Dickerson
1954	Western Carolina Junior College Conference	5–0–3	4–0–2	Fred I. Dickerson
1955†	Western Carolina Junior College Conference	4–3–1	2–1–1	Fred I. Dickerson
1956†	Western Carolina Junior College Conference	4–3	2–2	Fred I. Dickerson
1960	Western Carolina Junior College Conference	7–1	6–0	Fred I. Dickerson
1967	Region 10 Conference	8–1–1	5–0–1	George Litton
1987	Coastal Football Conference	12–0	5–0	Mac Bryan
1988†	Coastal Football Conference	9–2	4–1	Mac Bryan

† Co-champions

=== Division championships ===
Lees–McRae claimed one division title, with the only one coming in 1975.

Year	Conference	Overall record	Conference record	Coach
1975	Coastal Football Conference Southern Division	7–3	4–2	Warren Klawiter

== Postseason games ==
=== NJCAA playoff games ===
Lees–McRae appeared in the NJCAA playoffs just once, with an overall record of 0–1.

Year	Round	Opponent	Result
1967	Savannah Shrine Bowl	NE Oklahoma A&M	L, 35–13

=== Bowl games ===
Lees–McRae participated in nine bowl games, and had a record of 2–7.

Season	Coach	Bowl	Opponent	Result
1949	Fred I. Dickerson	Little Sugar Bowl	Wharton County	L, 49–0
1950	Fred I. Dickerson	Golden Isles Bowl	South Georgia	L, 24–6
1953	Fred I. Dickerson	Golden Isles Bowl	South Georgia	L, 20–7
1968	George Litton	El Toro Bowl	Arizona Western	L, 27–6
1986	Mac Bryan	East Bowl	Mississippi Gulf Coast	L, 14–13
1987	Mac Bryan	East Bowl	Grand Rapids	W, 20–13
1988	Mac Bryan	Mid-America Bowl	NE Oklahoma A&M	L, 36–7
1989	Mac Bryan	East Bowl	Itawamba	W, 27–18
1990	Mac Bryan	East Bowl	Butler County	L, 23–8

== List of head coaches ==
=== Key ===
Key to symbols in coaches list
General		Overall		Conference		Postseason (Note: Although the first Rose Bowl Game was played in 1902, it has been continuously played since the 1916 game, and is recognized as the oldest bowl game by the NCAA. "—" indicates any season prior to 1916 when postseason games were not played.)	
No.	Order of coaches (Note: A running total of the number of head coaches, with coaches who served separate tenures being counted only once. Interim head coaches are represented with "Int" and are not counted in the running total. "—" indicates the team played but either without a coach or no coach is on record. "X" indicates an interim year without play.)	GC	Games coached	CW	Conference wins	PW	Postseason wins
DC	Division championships	OW	Overall wins	CL	Conference losses	PL	Postseason losses
CC	Conference championships	OL	Overall losses	CT	Conference ties	PT	Postseason ties
NC	National championships	OT	Overall ties (Note: Overtime rules in college football were introduced in 1996, making ties impossible in the period since.)	C%	Conference winning percentage		
†	Elected to the College Football Hall of Fame	O%	Overall winning percentage (Note: When computing the win–loss percentage, a tie counts as half a win and half a loss.)				

=== Coaches ===
List of head football coaches showing season(s) coached, overall records, conference records, postseason records, championships and selected awards
No.	Name	Season(s)	GC	OW	OL	OT	O%	CW	CL	CT	C%	PW	PL	PT	DC	CC	NC	Awards
1	Dick Flinn	1929	4	2	2	0	0.500				–	0	0	0	0	0	0	0
2	Charlie Zimmerman	1930–1931	16	5	8	3	0.406				–	0	0	0	0	0	0	0
3	Don King	1932	8	2	5	1	0.313	1	4	1	0.250	0	0	0	0	0	0	0
4	Fred I. Dickerson	1933–1935, 1946–1961	153	75	62	16	0.542	51	38	12	0.564	0	0	0	0	6	0	0
5	Johnny Mackorell	1936–1939	29	9	19	1	0.328				–	0	0	0	0	0	0	0
6	George Litton	1962–1969	77	41	32	4	0.558	15	22	2	0.408	0	1	0	0	1	0	0
7	Jim Osborne	1970	10	6	4	0	0.591	2	4	0	0.333	0	0	0	0	0	0	0
8	Mike Cook	1971–1974	37	22	14	1	0.608	12	10	1	0.543	0	0	0	0	0	0	0
9	Warren Klawiter	1975	10	7	3	0	0.700	4	2	0	0.667	0	0	0	0	0	0	0
10	Cole Proctor	1976–1978	29	14	15	0	0.483	6	10	0	0.375	0	0	0	0	0	0	0
11	Bill Bomar	1979	10	6	4	0	0.600	4	2	0	0.667	0	0	0	0	0	0	0
12	Soupy Campbell	1980–1984	59	30	27	2	0.525	15	21	1	0.419	0	0	0	0	0	0	0
13	Mac Bryan	1986–1990	54	44	9	1	0.824	19	5	0	0.792	0	0	0	0	2	0	0
14	John Pate	1991–1993	30	5	24	1	0.183				–	0	0	0	0	0	0	0

== Year-by-year results ==
National champions	Conference champions	Division champions	Bowl game berth	Playoff berth

Season	Year	Head coach	Association	Division	Conference	Record							Postseason	Final ranking
Season	Year	Head coach	Association	Division	Conference	Overall			Conference				Postseason	Final ranking
Season	Year	Head coach	Association	Division	Conference	Win	Loss	Tie	Finish	Win	Loss	Tie	Postseason	Final ranking
Lees–McRae Bulldogs
1929	1929	Dick Flinn	—	—	Independent	2	2	0						
1930	1930	Charlie Zimmerman	—	—	Independent	2	4	2						
1931	1931	Charlie Zimmerman	—	—	Independent	3	4	1						
1932	1932	Don King	—	—	NCJCC	2	5	1	8th	1	4	1		
1933	1933	Fred I. Dickerson	—	—	NCJCC	5	3	2	T–3rd	3	2	0		
1934	1934	Fred I. Dickerson	—	—	NCJCC	3	6	0	4th	2	2	0		
1935	1935	Fred I. Dickerson	—	—	NCJCC	2	5	1	6th	2	4	1		
1936	1936	Johnny Mackorell	—	—	Independent	2	5	0						
1937	1937	Johnny Mackorell	—	—	Independent	3	4	0						
Lees–McRae Bobcats
1938	1938	Johnny Mackorell	IAA	—	Independent	1	5	1						
1939	1939	Johnny Mackorell	IAA	—	Independent	3	5	0					—	—
No team from 1940 to 1945
1946	1946	Fred I. Dickerson	NJCAA	—	NCJCC / CJCC	0	7	1	7th	0	5	1	—	—
1947	1947	Fred I. Dickerson	NJCAA	—	NCJCC / CJCC	2	5	2	6th	1	3	2	—	—
1948	1948	Fred I. Dickerson	NJCAA	—	NCJCC / CJCC	6	1	1	1st	4	0	1	—	—
1949	1949	Fred I. Dickerson	NJCAA	—	NCJCC / CJCC	9	2	1	1st	5	0	0	L Little Sugar Bowl	—
1950	1950	Fred I. Dickerson	NJCAA	—	NCJCC / CJCC	7	1	1	1st	5	0	0	L Golden Isles Bowl	—
1951	1951	Fred I. Dickerson	NJCAA	—	WCJCC	4	2	0	1st	3	2	0	—	—
1952	1952	Fred I. Dickerson	NJCAA	—	WCJCC	3	3	1	3rd	3	3	1	—	—
1953	1953	Fred I. Dickerson	NJCAA	—	WCJCC	8	2	0	1st	5	1	0	L Golden Isles Bowl	—
1954	1954	Fred I. Dickerson	NJCAA	—	WCJCC	5	0	3	1st	4	0	2	—	—
1955	1955	Fred I. Dickerson	NJCAA	—	WCJCC	4	3	1	T–1st	2	1	1	—	—
1956	1956	Fred I. Dickerson	NJCAA	—	WCJCC	4	3	0	T–1st	2	2	0	—	—
1957	1957	Fred I. Dickerson	NJCAA	—	WCJCC	3	3	1	4th	1	2	1	—	—
1958	1958	Fred I. Dickerson	NJCAA	—	WCJCC	1	5	2	4th	1	4	1	—	—
1959	1959	Fred I. Dickerson	NJCAA	—	WCJCC	1	6	1	4th	1	4	1	—	—
1960	1960	Fred I. Dickerson	NJCAA	—	WCJCC	7	1	0	1st	6	0	0	—	—
1961	1961	Fred I. Dickerson	NJCAA	—	WCJCC	1	4	1	4th	1	3	1	—	—
1962	1962	George Litton	NJCAA	—	WCJCC	2	7	0	4th	1	3	0	—	—
1963	1963	George Litton	NJCAA	—	R10	2	6	1	4th	1	5	0	—	—
1964	1964	George Litton	NJCAA	—	R10	3	6	0	4th	2	4	0	—	—
1965	1965	George Litton	NJCAA	—	R10	5	5	0	4th	1	4	0	—	—
1966	1966	George Litton	NJCAA	—	R10	6	4	0	4th	1	4	0	—	—
1967	1967	George Litton	NJCAA	—	R10	8	1	1	1st	5	0	1	L Savannah Shrine Bowl	2
1968	1968	George Litton	NJCAA	—	R10	8	2	1	2nd	3	1	0	L El Toro Bowl	10
1969	1969	George Litton	NJCAA	—	R10	7	1	1	2nd	1	1	0	—	10
1970	1970	Jim Osborne	NJCAA	—	CFC	6	4	0	5th	2	4	0	—	—
1971	1971	Mike Cook	NJCAA	—	CFC	6	3	1	2nd	4	1	1	—	—
1972	1972	Mike Cook	NJCAA	—	CFC	3	6	0	T–4th	2	4	0	—	—
1973	1973	Mike Cook	NJCAA	—	CFC	7	2	0	3rd	3	2	0	—	—
1974	1974	Mike Cook	NJCAA	—	CFC	6	3	0	4th	3	3	0	—	—
1975	1975	Warren Klawiter	NJCAA	—	CFC	7	3	0	1st (Southern)	4	2	0	—	—
1976	1976	Cole Proctor	NJCAA	—	CFC	5	4	0	3rd (Southern)	3	2	0	—	—
1977	1977	Cole Proctor	NJCAA	—	CFC	4	6	0	7th	1	4	0	—	—
1978	1978	Cole Proctor	NJCAA	—	CFC	5	5	0	6th	2	4	0	—	—
1979	1979	Bill Bomar	NJCAA	—	CFC	6	4	0	2nd	4	2	0	—	—
1980	1980	Soupy Campbell	NJCAA	—	CFC	7	3	0	5th	3	3	0	—	—
1981	1981	Soupy Campbell	NJCAA	—	CFC	4	6	0	8th	2	6	0	—	—
1982	1982	Soupy Campbell	NJCAA	—	CFC	6	3	1	3rd	3	2	1	—	—
1983	1983	Soupy Campbell	NJCAA	—	CFC	2	7	0	8th	1	5	0	—	—
1984	1984	Soupy Campbell	NJCAA	—	CFC	5	5	0	6th	2	4	0	—	—
1985	1985	Soupy Campbell	NJCAA	—	CFC	6	3	1	3rd	3	2	0	—	—
1986	1986	Mac Bryan	NJCAA	—	CFC	9	1	1	1st	5	0	0	L East Bowl	4
1987	1987	Mac Bryan	NJCAA	—	CFC	12	0	0	1st	5	0	0	W East Bowl	2
1988	1988	Mac Bryan	NJCAA	—	CFC	9	2	0	T–1st	4	1	0	L Mid-America Bowl	7
1989	1989	Mac Bryan	NJCAA	—	CFC	8	2	0	2nd	3	1	0	W East Bowl	—
1990	1990	Mac Bryan	NJCAA	—	CFC	6	4	0	4th	2	3	0	L East Bowl	—
1991	1991	John Pate	NCAA	Division II	Independent	1	9	0					—	—
1992	1992	John Pate	NCAA	Division II	Independent	1	9	0					—	—
1993	1993	John Pate	NCAA	Division II	Independent	3	6	1					—	—

== Individual accomplishments ==
=== All-Americans ===
Lees–McRae produced 27 All-Americans with Robert Hardy being the only two-time All-American. 17 of the programs 27 All-Americans were First-Team.

First Team

Year	Player	Position	Source
1960	Terry Postell	RB	
1963	Lane Hurley	TE	
1967	Bill Martin	OG	
1968	William Martin	OG	
1969	Arthur Morrison	OG	
1975	Wardell Johnson	RB	
1976	Brian Johnson	LB	
1980	Otis Lindsey	LB	
1980	Russ Carpentiere	PK	
1981	Andy Kilgore	RB	
1984	Deron Farina	OL	
1986	James Galloway	LB	
1987	Robert Hardy	RB	
1988	Robert Hardy	RB	
1988	Craig Brawley	PK	
1989	Richard Maddox	DL	
1990	Jeff Fortner	OL	

Second Team

Year	Player	Position	Source
1956	Allison Richardson	OG	
1970	Carl Witherspoon	DT	
1971	Ron Parson	RB	
1977	Barry Tolley	OL	
1978	Jeff Bridges	OL	
1982	Larry Spears		
1985	Todd Daggs		
1986	Steve Debell	DL	
1987	Randy Norris	RB	
1989	Randal Olds	OL	

Honorable mentions

Year	Player	Position	Source
1962	Lane Hurley	TE	
1964	Freddy Waltom	QB	
1965	Cecil Ratcliff	TE	
1965	Mike Sizemore	TE	
1966	Ron Rossello	RB	
1967	Danny Copenhaver	S	
1967	Wally Matthews	RB	
1968	George Porter	DL	
1975	Frank Wilson	LB	
1975	Ron Wilson	DL	
1975	Henry Vinson	OL	
1976	Paul Talley		
1978	Rick Crosby		
1983	Rusty Smith		
1985	Chris Ledbetter		
1986	Anthony Pearson		
1987	Wesley Pope		
1988	Calvin Tiggle		
