= Putnam County School District =

School district in Georgia (U.S. state)

Putnam County Charter School System

Address
- 158 Old Glenwood Springs Road Eatonton, Georgia, 31024-6525; United States
- Coordinates: 33.311453°N 83.396018°W

District information
- Grades: Head Start - 12
- Superintendent: Derrick Austin
- Accreditations: Southern Association of Colleges and Schools; Georgia Accrediting Commission

Students and staff
- Enrollment: 2,900
- Faculty: 250

Other information
- Telephone: (706) 485-5381
- Fax: (706) 485-3820
- Website: www.putnam.k12.ga.us

The Putnam County Charter School System (PCCSS), is a public school district in Putnam County, Georgia, United States, based in Eatonton.

== Schools ==
The Putnam County School District has one primary school, one elementary school, one middle school, and one high school.

=== Primary school ===
- Putnam County Primary School

=== Elementary school ===
- Putnam County Elementary School

=== Middle school ===
- Putnam County Middle School

=== High school ===
- Putnam County High School
