= Leonard Wheeler =

American football player (born 1969)

No. 37
- Position: Safety

Personal information
- Born: January 15, 1969 (age 57); Toccoa, Georgia, U.S.
- Listed height: 6 ft 0 in (1.83 m)
- Listed weight: 192 lb (87 kg)

Career information
- College: Troy State
- NFL draft: 1992: 3rd round, 84th overall pick

Career history
- Cincinnati Bengals (1992–1996); Minnesota Vikings (1997); Carolina Panthers (1998–1999)

Career NFL statistics
- Tackles: 116
- Interceptions: 1
- Sacks: 2
- Stats at Pro Football Reference

Leonard Tyrone Wheeler (born January 15, 1969) is an American former professional football player who was a safety in the National Football League (NFL). He was selected by the Cincinnati Bengals in the third round of the 1992 NFL draft. He played college football at Lees-McRae College, Ole Miss, and Troy State.

Pre-draft measurables
Height	Weight	Arm length	Hand span	40-yard dash	10-yard split	20-yard split	Vertical jump	Broad jump	Bench press
5 ft 11 1/4 in (1.81 m)	189 lb (86 kg)	31 7/8 in (0.81 m)	8 3/4 in (0.22 m)	4.59 s	1.58 s	2.62 s	37.0 in (0.94 m)	10 ft 2 in (3.10 m)	21 reps

Wheeler also played for the Minnesota Vikings and Carolina Panthers.
