= Northwest Cabarrus High School =

American public school in North Carolina

Location
- 5130 Northwest Cabarrus Drive; Concord, North Carolina 28027; United States; 35°27′02″N 80°39′44″W

Information
- School type: Public
- Established: 1966 (60 years ago)
- School district: Cabarrus County Schools
- CEEB code: 340900
- Principal: Chad Thomas
- Teaching staff: 68.60 (on an FTE basis)
- Enrollment: 1,168 (2023–2024)
- Student to teacher ratio: 17.03
- Colors: Orange, black, and white
- Nickname: Trojans
- Website: nwchs.cabarrus.k12.nc.us

Northwest Cabarrus High School, commonly referred to simply as Northwest and abbreviated as NCHS, is a comprehensive public high school located in Cabarrus County, North Carolina, United States. The school is a part of the Cabarrus County Schools system. While the school has a Concord mailing address, it is physically located in the city limits of neighboring Kannapolis. Northwest Cabarrus High School opened in 1966, merging the former high schools in the Odell and Winecoff communities.

== Academics ==
Northwest's academic coursework falls in line with the North Carolina Standard Course of Study in all core subject areas. Advanced Placement courses are offered in United States History, American Government and Politics, Biology, Studio Art, Chemistry, Physics, Environmental Science, English language, English Literature, Statistics, and Calculus.

== Athletics ==
Northwest's athletic teams are known as the Trojans. The school is a member of the North Carolina High School Athletic Association. The school sponsors football, tennis, cross country, soccer, basketball, wrestling, swimming, baseball, track, and golf; and girls' tennis, volleyball, cross country, soccer, basketball, swimming, softball, track, and cheerleading.

The Trojan athletic program has won three team state championships—one in baseball (1971), and two in girls cross country (1990 and 1991).

== Fine Arts ==
=== ITS (International Thespian Society) ===
ITS is a student honorary division of the Educational Theatre Association. ITS offers festivals and conferences to further a student's education in theatre. Continued activities are conducted by the President and Vice-President.

==== Continued Events planned by ITS ====
- Fall Play
- Spring Musical
- Musical Theatre Showcase
- One Act Play
- Trunk-or-Treat
- Improv Team
- 24 Hour Play Project
- 10 Minute Play Festival

==== Awards ====
In 2012 the Advanced Acting class took the one act play, "The Yellow Boat" to NCTC (North Carolina Theatre Conference) Regionals. Awards received at regionals include: Outstanding Achievement in Ensemble Acting, Excellence in Directing(Andrea Rassler), Excellence in Acting(Lole Johnson), and Distinguished Play(votes from the Audience). The Show Advanced to NCTC (North Carolina Theatre Conference) States for the first time where they received an award in Excellence in Use of Props.

Blumey awards:

Year	Show	Award	Person awarded (if applicable)
2015	Little Women	Lead Actress	Lauren Hunkele

== Notable alumni ==
- Corey LaJoie (2009) — NASCAR driver
- Bradley Pinion (2012) — NFL punter and Super Bowl LV champion
- Rachel Reilly (2002) — contestant on Big Brother 12 and winner of Big Brother 13
- Corey Seager (2012) — MLB shortstop, 5x All-Star selection, 2020 and 2023 World Series MVP & champion
- Kyle Seager (2006) — MLB third baseman and 2014 All-Star selection
- Skeet Ulrich (1988) — American actor
- Bubba Wallace (2011) — NASCAR driver
