= Jan Klawiter =

Polish politician (born 1950)

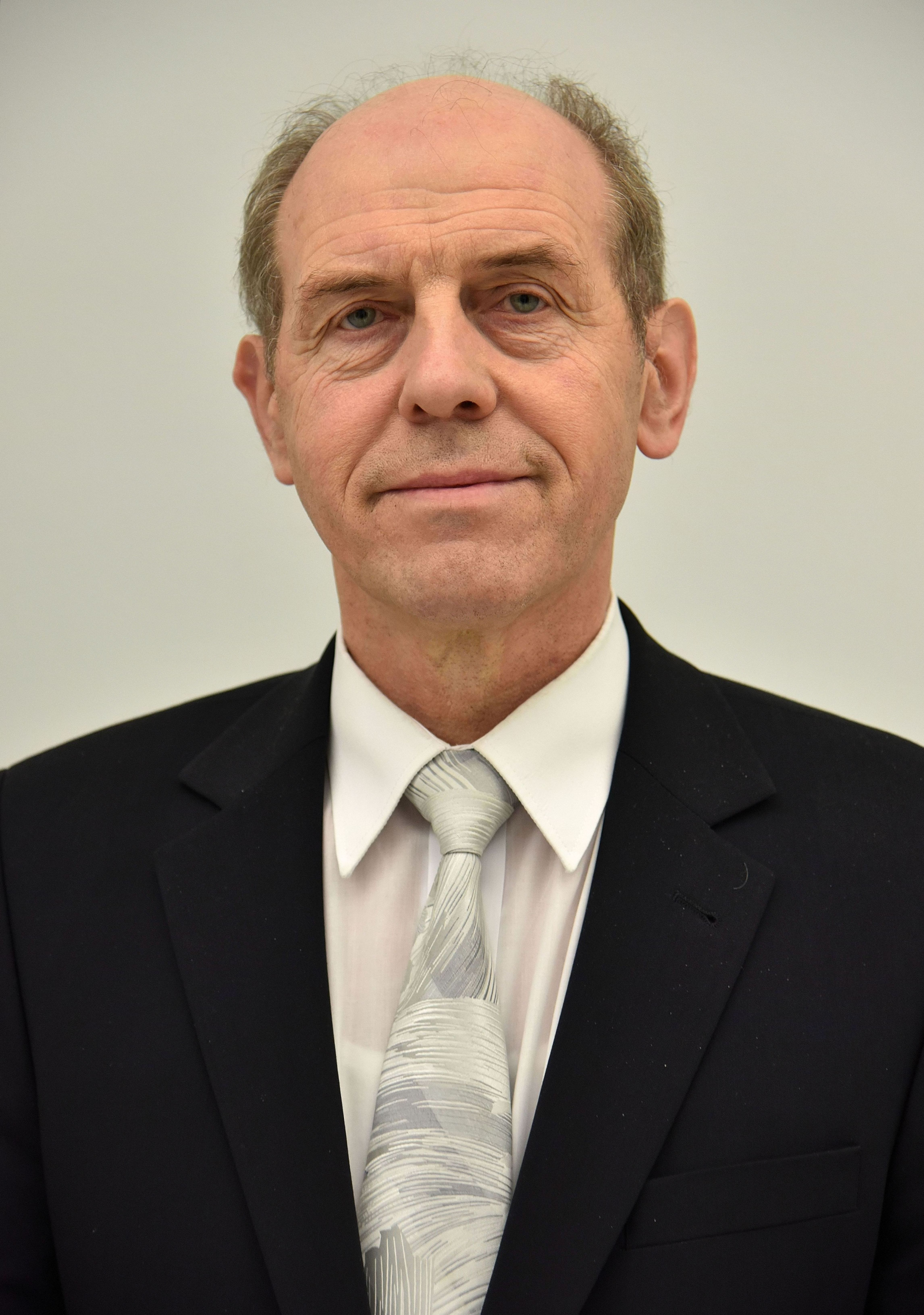
- Klawiter in 2016

Member of the Sejm
- Incumbent
- Assumed office 2015
- Constituency: Gdynia

Mayor of Rumia
- In office 1992–2002

Personal details
- Born: 10 November 1950 (age 75) Rumia, Poland
- Party: Law and Justice; Right Wing of the Republic
- Spouse: Urszula Wruk
- Children: 3 (2 deceased)

Jan Klawiter (born 10 November 1950) is a Polish politician. Since 2015 he has been a member of the Sejm from the parliamentary constituency of Gdynia. He was also mayor of his hometown of Rumia for ten years.

== Personal life ==
Klawiter is of Kashubian descent. In 1973, he graduated from Gdańsk University of Technology and received his PhD when he defended his doctoral dissertation in 1982, on the implementation of liquid chromatographs. In 1977, he married Urszula Wruk. In 1979 the couple had twins, although both died during birth. In 1983, their daughter Małgorzata was born.

Klawiter is a devout Roman Catholic and a member of the Knights of the Holy Sepulcher in Jerusalem. In his youth he was the president of the local chapter of Catholic Action.

== Political career ==
Klawiter served as mayor of his hometown of Rumia from 1992 to 2002. In 2006, he became a councilor of the Pomeranian Seym from the PiS list, and in 2010 a councilor of the Wejherowo poviat. On 15 December 2012, he was elected the chairman of the board of the Right of the Republic of Poland in the Pomeranian Voivodeship. In 2014 he ran as a candidate from the PiS list for the European Parliament, and later for the regional council. In 2015 he was elected to the Sejm.

Klawiter is heavily against In vitro fertilisation and abortion due to his Catholic faith. While he esposes many views held by the far-right in Poland, other politicians have said that Klawiter is always polite in expressing his views. Nonetheless, Dorota Wójcik, president of the Polish chapter of the Freedom From Religion Foundation expressed discomfort of Klawiter's close connection to the Knights of the Holy Sepulcher in Jerusalem and their leader Edwin Frederick O'Brien.
