= Coastal Football Conference =

Junior college athletic conference in Eastern United States

The Coastal Football Conference was a football-only junior college athletic conference with member schools located in the Mid-Atlantic region of the United States. The conference's members included Community College of Baltimore—now known as Baltimore City Community College, Chowan College—now known as Chowan University—in Murfreesboro, North Carolina, Ferrum College in Ferrum, Virginia, Lees–McRae College in Banner Elk, North Carolina, Harford Community College in Bel Air, Maryland, Potomac State College in Keyser, West Virginia, and Wesley College, in Dover, Delaware. The Coastal Football Conference was formed in January 1970 at Ferrum. Hank Norton, the head football coach at Ferrum College, was appointed the first president of the conference. In 1975, Hudson Valley Community College of Troy, New York was added to the Coastal Football Conference, and the conference was split into two divisions.

== Yearly standings ==
1971 Coastal Football Conference standings
	Conf.					Overall
Team	W		L		T	W		L		T
Ferrum $	5	–	0	–	1	8	–	0	–	1
Lees–McRae	4	–	1	–	1	6	–	3	–	1
Baltimore	3	–	2	–	1	6	–	2	–	1
Wesley	3	–	3	–	0	6	–	3	–	0
Potomac State	3	–	3	–	0	5	–	4	–	0
Chowan	1	–	4	–	1	3	–	4	–	1
Harford	0	–	6	–	0	1	–	8	–	0
$ – Conference champion

1972 Coastal Football Conference standings
	Conf.					Overall
Team	W		L		T	W		L		T
Ferrum $	3	–	1	–	0	7	–	1	–	0
Wesley	4	–	1	–	1	7	–	1	–	1
Chowan	4	–	2	–	0	6	–	3	–	0
Baltimore	2	–	4	–	0	4	–	5	–	0
Lees–McRae	2	–	4	–	0	3	–	6	–	0
Potomac State	1	–	3	–	2	1	–	6	–	2
Harford	1	–	4	–	1	2	–	6	–	1
$ – Conference champion

1974 Coastal Football Conference standings
	Conf.					Overall
Team	W		L		T	W		L		T
Ferrum $	6	–	0	–	0	10	–	0	–	0
Chowan	4	–	2	–	0	7	–	2	–	0
Nassau	4	–	2	–	0	6	–	2	–	0
Lees–McRae	3	–	3	–	0	6	–	3	–	0
Wesley	2	–	4	–	0	5	–	4	–	0
Potomac State	1	–	5	–	0	3	–	7	–	0
Baltimore	1	–	5	–	0	1	–	8	–	0
$ – Conference champion

1979 Coastal Football Conference standings
	Conf.					Overall
Team	W		L		T	W		L		T
Ferrum $	7	–	0	–	0	10	–	1	–	0
Lees–McRae	4	–	2	–	0	6	–	4	–	0
Chowan	4	–	3	–	0	7	–	4	–	0
Nassau	4	–	3	–	0	6	–	4	–	0
Hudson Valley	2	–	4	–	0	5	–	4	–	0
Wesley (DE)	3	–	5	–	0	4	–	6	–	0
Westchester	2	–	5	–	0	3	–	6	–	0
Potomac State	2	–	5	–	0	2	–	7	–	1
$ – Conference champion

1980 Coastal Football Conference standings
	Conf.					Overall
Team	W		L		T	W		L		T
Ferrum +	5	–	1	–	0	9	–	1	–	1
Hudson Valley +	5	–	1	–	0	8	–	1	–	0
Chowan	4	–	2	–	0	8	–	2	–	0
Nassau	4	–	3	–	0	7	–	3	–	0
Lees–McRae	3	–	3	–	0	7	–	3	–	0
Wesley (DE)	2	–	3	–	0	4	–	6	–	0
Westchester	1	–	4	–	0	4	–	5	–	0
Potomac State	0	–	7	–	0	0	–	10	–	0
+ – Conference co-champions

1981 Coastal Football Conference standings
	Conf.					Overall
Team	W		L		T	W		L		T
Ferrum +	6	–	2	–	0	8	–	2	–	0
Nassau +	6	–	2	–	0	8	–	2	–	0
Chowan +	6	–	2	–	0	7	–	3	–	0
Hudson Valley	5	–	2	–	0	6	–	3	–	0
Montgomery (MD)	5	–	3	–	0	6	–	4	–	0
Westchester	3	–	4	–	1	3	–	4	–	1
Potomac State	2	–	5	–	1	2	–	6	–	1
Lees–McRae	2	–	6	–	0	4	–	6	–	0
Wesley (DE)	0	–	8	–	0	0	–	10	–	0
+ – Conference co-champions

1987 Coastal Football Conference standings
	Conf.					Overall
Team	W		L		T	W		L		T
Lees–McRae $	5	–	0	–	0	12	–	0	–	0
Montgomery (MD)	3	–	2	–	0	7	–	2	–	0
Chowan	3	–	2	–	0	6	–	4	–	1
Nassau	2	–	3	–	0	4	–	4	–	0
Hudson Valley	0	–	5	–	0	2	–	7	–	1
Potomac State	?	–	?	–	?	5	–	4	–	0
$ – Conference champion
