= Lees–McRae College =

Private college in Banner Elk, North Carolina, US

- Former names: The Elizabeth McRae Institute (1900–1903); The Elizabeth McRae–Suzanna Lees Institute (1903–1907); The Lees–McRae Institute (1907–1931)
- Motto: In Montibus, Ex Montibus, Pro Montibus (Latin)
- Motto in English: In the mountains, of the mountains, for the mountains
- Type: Private college
- Established: 1900; 126 years ago
- Religious affiliation: Presbyterian Church (USA)
- Endowment: $35 million
- President: H. Lee King
- Provost: Pam Vesely
- Faculty: 61 full-time and 61 part-time (fall 2025)
- Students: 910 (fall 2025)
- Location: Banner Elk, North Carolina, U.S. 36.1621°N 81.8757°W
- Campus: 400 acres (160 ha); Rural
- Colors: Green & gold
- Nickname: Bobcats
- Sporting affiliations: NCAA Division II – Carolinas
- Mascot: Wily the Bobcat
- Website: lmc.edu

Lees–McRae College is a private college in Banner Elk, North Carolina, United States, affiliated with the Presbyterian Church (USA). Lees–McRae College sits in the Appalachian Mountains at 3,720 feet (1,130 m) above sea level, the highest elevation of any American college or university east of the Mississippi River. It is one of the few colleges to be named after two women, Suzanna Lees and Elizabeth McRae.

== History ==
Lees–McRae College was founded in Banner Elk as an all-female high school in 1899 by the Reverend Edgar Tufts, a Presbyterian minister. He named the school "The Elizabeth McRae Institute" after a well-respected educator in 1900. The name of school benefactor Suzanna Lees was added in 1903, and the school became "The Lees–McRae Institute" when it was chartered by the state in 1907.

An all-male branch was founded in 1907 in nearby Plumtree, North Carolina. The Plumtree facility was destroyed in a 1927 fire, leading the two campuses to merge at the Banner Elk site. After the merger, the high school program was phased out, and in 1931 the institute was renamed "Lees–McRae College" as an accredited, coeducational junior college.

Lees–McRae began moving toward offering a four-year program in the late 1980s, and the school's president made the recommendation to the board of trustees in 1987. The Southern Association of Colleges and Schools granted Lees–McRae status as a four-year college in 1990. In 2005, Lees–McRae became the first expansion site for New Opportunity School for Women, a program that helps educate and employ women in Appalachia.

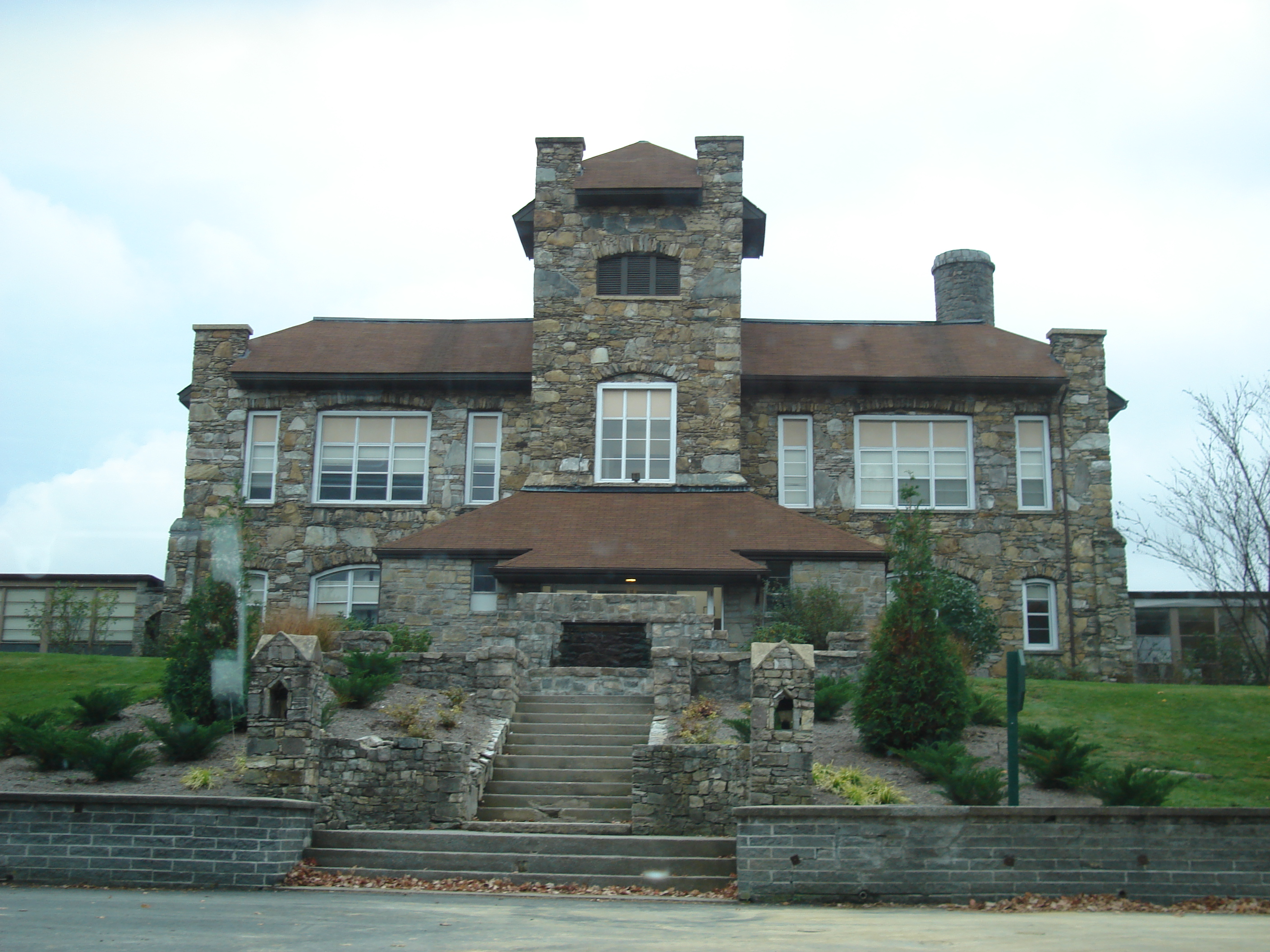
North Carolina Building

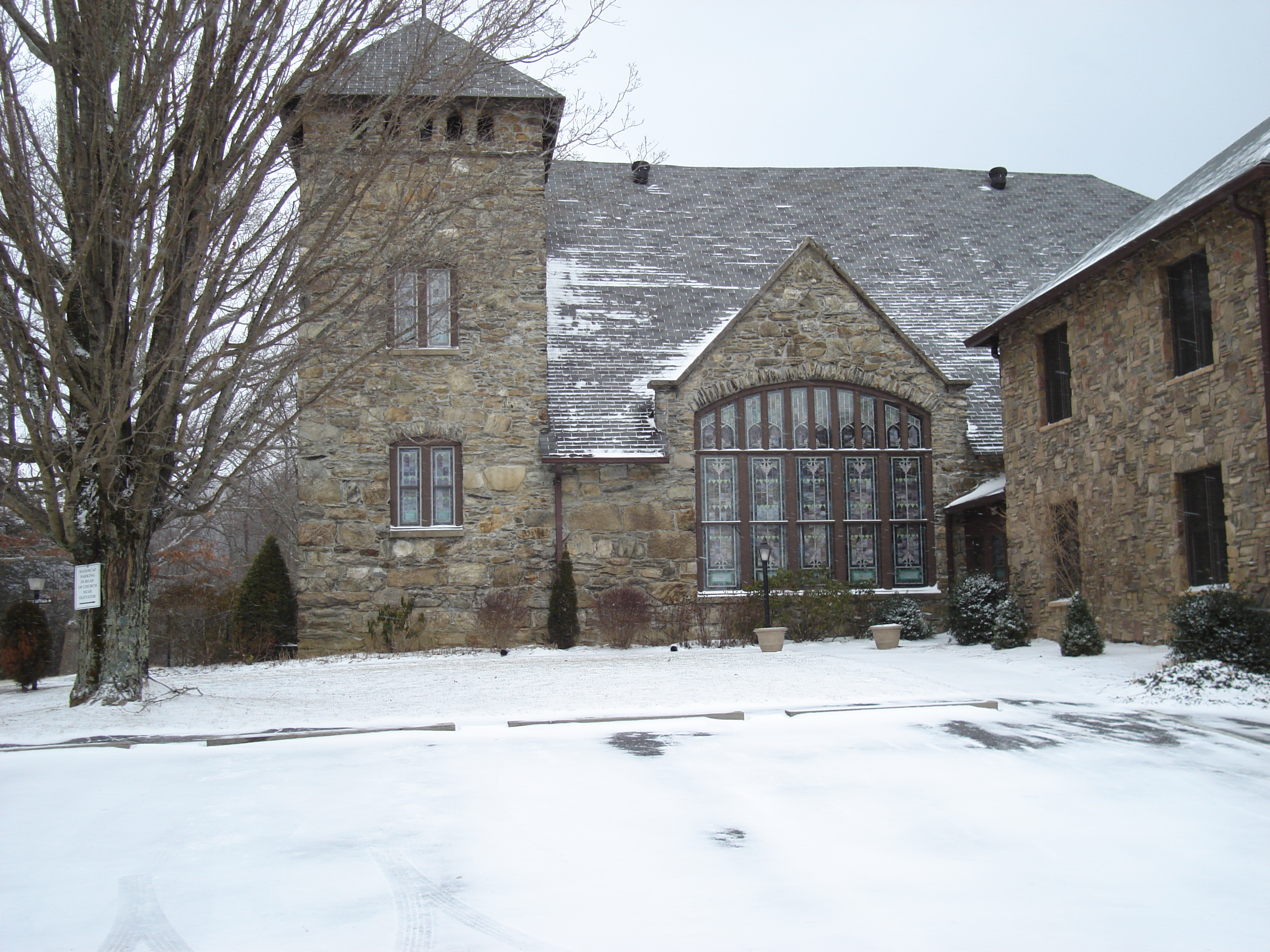
Banner Elk Presbyterian Church

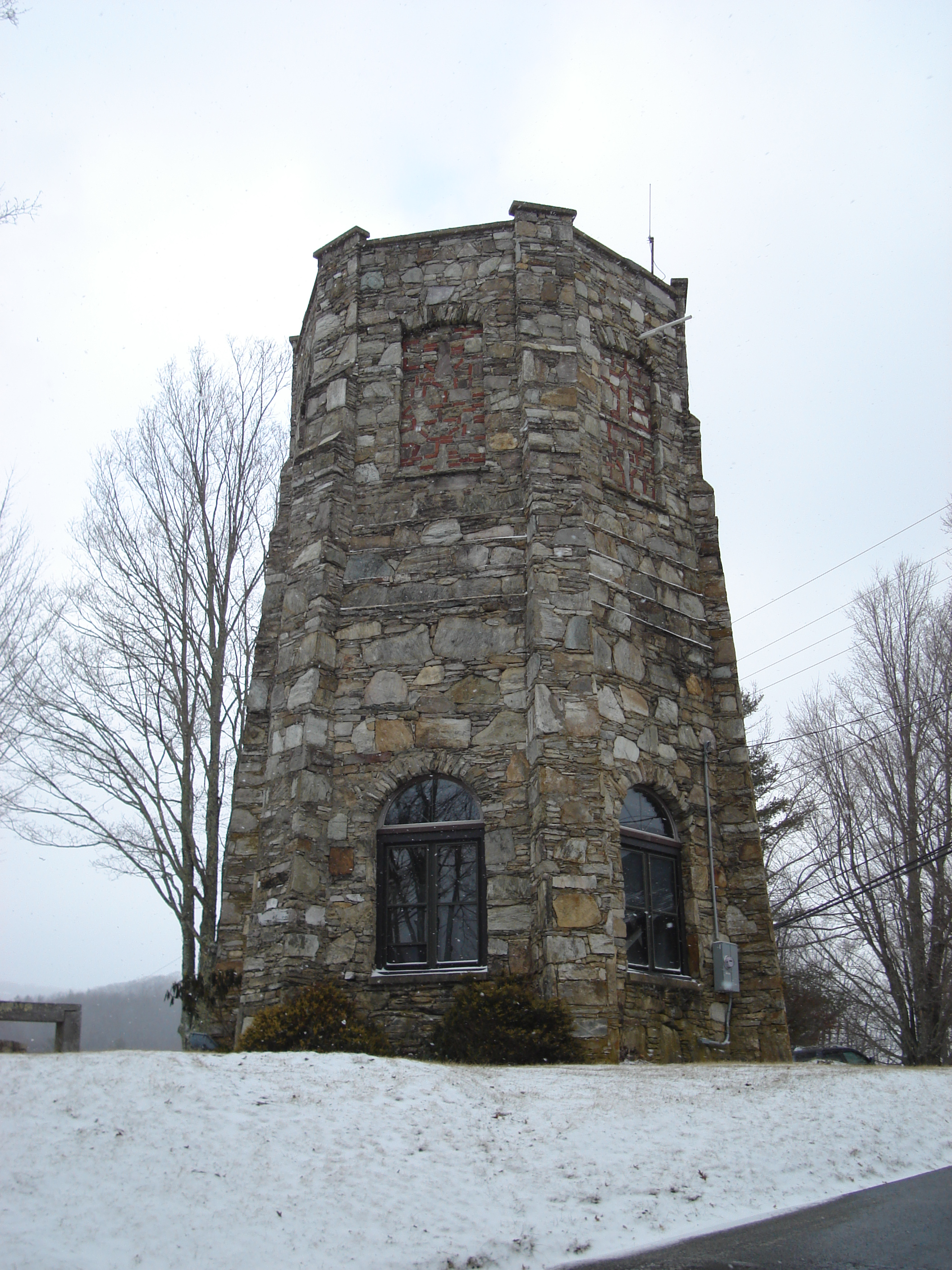
Tufts Tower

== Athletics ==
Athletics wordmark

The Lees–McRae Bobcats compete in NCAA Division II as a member of Conference Carolinas. All athletic teams are eligible for athletic scholarships. The college is also home to a cycling team, which competes in Division I and holds national championships.

The varsity sports teams are listed below:

| Men's sports | Women's sports |
|---|---|
| Alpine Ski Racing | Alpine Ski Racing |
| Basketball | Basketball |
| Cross county | Cross county |
| Cycling | Cycling |
| Lacrosse | Lacrosse |
| Soccer | Soccer |
| Tennis | Softball |
| Track and field | Track and field |
| Volleyball | Volleyball |
| Golf (2026) | Golf (2026) |
| Baseball (2027) | Tennis |
| Cheerleading | Flag Football (2026) |
| Dance | Cheerleading |
| Snowboarding | Dance |
| | Snowboarding |

== Notable alumni ==
- Brent Bookwalter, professional cyclist
- Troy Brown, professional football player
- Thomas Ferebee, bombardier aboard the Enola Gay
- Clark Gaines, professional football player
- Roy Lassiter, professional soccer player and Olympian
- Will MacKenzie, professional golfer
- Khano Smith, professional soccer player
- Lee Squires, college soccer coach
- John B. Stephenson, former professor at LMC
- Carla Swart, professional cyclist
- Andrew Talansky, professional cyclist
- Kerry Werner, professional cyclist
- Leonard Wheeler, professional football player
