= Tay Brown =

American football player (1911–1994)

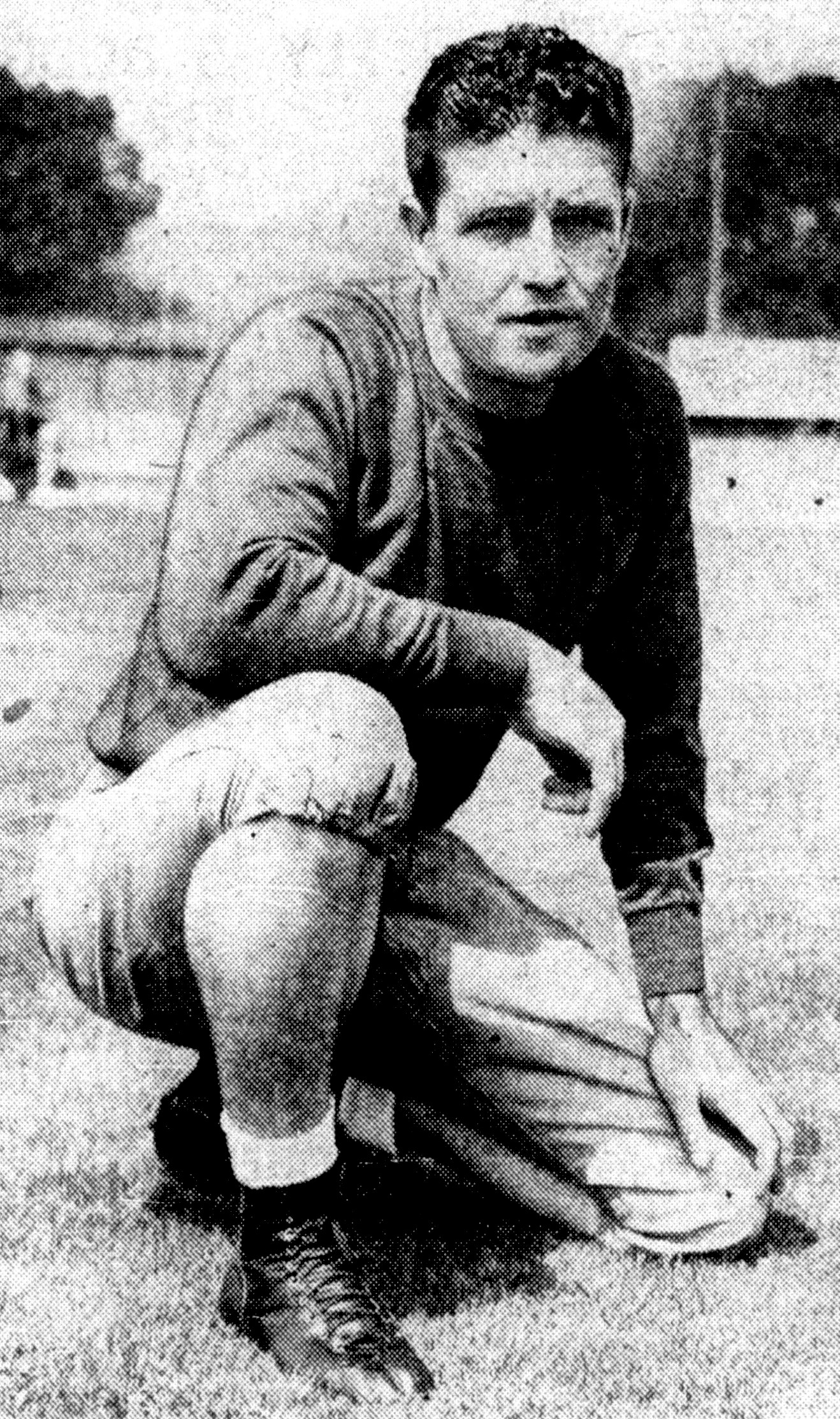
- Brown, c. 1951

Biographical details
- Born: December 29, 1911; Compton, California, U.S.
- Died: August 16, 1994 (aged 82); Los Angeles, California, U.S.

Playing career

Football
- 1930–1932: USC
- Position: Tackle

Coaching career (HC unless noted)

Football
- 1933–1936: Cincinnati (line)
- 1937–1941: Compton
- 1945–1960: Compton

Basketball
- 1933–1937: Cincinnati
- 1937–?: Compton

Head coaching record
- Overall: 140–33–9 (junior college football); 47–27 (college basketball)
- Bowls: 4–1

Accomplishments and honors

Championships
- Football; 4 Metropolitan Conference (1939–1940, 1945–1946); 7 WSC (1950, 1952, 1954–1957, 1959)

Awards
- First-team All-PCC (1932)
- College Football Hall of Fame; Inducted in 1980 (profile)

Raymond "Tay" Brown (December 29, 1911 – August 16, 1994) was an American college football player and coach of football and basketball. He played football as a tackle and the University of Southern California (USC) was captain the 1932 USC Trojans football team, Howard Jones' only perfect season with the Trojans. Brown served as the head basketball coach at the University of Cincinnati from 1933 to 1937, compiling a record of 47–27. He was the head football coach at Compton College in Compton, California, amassing a record of 140–33–9. Brown was inducted to the College Football Hall of Fame as a player in 1980.

== Playing career ==
Brown was a member of USC's national championship-winning teams in 1931 and 1932. He set a Los Angeles Coliseum record by blocking four kicks in one game.

On July 1, 1934, Brown was reported as being traded, along with Marger Apsit, from the Boston Redskins to the Cincinnati Reds in exchange for Frank Abruzzino. However, Brown did not ever play for either team.

== Coaching career ==
Brown served as the head basketball coach and assistant football coach at the University of Cincinnati from 1933 to 1937. He later guided Compton College to four Junior Rose Bowl invitations while posting a 140–33–9 record at the school.

== Head coaching record ==
=== Junior college football ===
Year	Team	Overall	Conference	Standing	Bowl/playoffs
Compton Tartars () (1937)
1937	Compton				
Compton Tartars (Metropolitan Conference) (1938–1941)
1938	Compton		3–1	3rd	
1939	Compton		3–1	1st	
1940	Compton		5–1	T–1st	
1941	Compton		2–4	5th	
Compton Tartars (Metropolitan Conference) (1945–1946)
1945	Compton			1st	
1946	Compton	10–1	6–1	1st	W Junior Rose
Compton Tartars () (1947–1948)
1947	Compton	10–1			W Texas Rose Bowl
1948	Compton	12–0			W Junior Rose
Compton Tartars (Western State Conference) (1949–1960)
1949	Compton	7–2–1	4–0–1	2nd	
1950	Compton	10–1	4–1	1st	
1951	Compton	10–1	3–1	2nd	
1952	Compton	9–0–1	5–0	1st	
1953	Compton	5–4–2	2–2–1	T–3rd	
1954	Compton	9–0–1	4–0	1st	
1955	Compton	11–0	5–0	1st	W Junior Rose
1956	Compton	10–1	5–0	1st	L Junior Rose
1957	Compton	7–2	5–1	T–1st	
1958	Compton	7–2	5–1	1st	
1959	Compton	5–4	5–1	T–1st	
1960	Compton	5–5	2–5	T–5th	
Compton:		140–33–9			
Total:		140–33–9			
National championship Conference title Conference division title or championship game berth
