= 1946 Compton Tartars football team =

American college football season

1946 Compton Tartars football

Metropolitan champion Little Rose Bowl champion

Little Rose Bowl, W 19–0 vs. Kilgore
- Conference: Metropolitan Conference
- Record: 10–1 (6–1 Metropolitan)
- Head coach: Tay Brown (7th season)
- Home stadium: Ramsaur Stadium

1946 Metropolitan Conference football standings
	Conf.					Overall
Team	W		L		T	W		L		T
Compton $	6	–	1	–	0	10	–	1	–	0
Santa Monica	5	–	1	–	1	6	–	2	–	1
Long Beach	5	–	2	–	0	9	–	2	–	0
Los Angeles City	4	–	2	–	1	6	–	3	–	1
Bakersfield	4	–	3	–	0	7	–	3	–	1
Ventura	1	–	5	–	1	4	–	5	–	1
Glendale (CA)	1	–	5	–	1	2	–	7	–	1
Pasadena	0	–	7	–	0	0	–	9	–	1
$ – Conference champion

The 1946 Compton Tartars football team was an American football team that represented Compton College as a member of the Metropolitan Conference during the 1946 junior college football season. Led by seventh-year head coach Tay Brown, the team compiled a 10–1 record (6–1 against conference opponents), won the Metropolitan Conference championship, defeated Kilgore in the Little Rose Bowl, and outscored all opponents by a total of 284 to 94.

The team ranked sixth nationally among small college teams in total offense with an average of 331.1 yards per game. The offense was led by fullback John Finney and quarterback Bev Wallace. Finney averaged 6.3 yards per carry and was named "Player of the Year" by the All-Southern California board of football. In the Little Rose Bowl game, Wallace completed 11 of 16 passes for 176 yards and three touchdowns. Wallace later played three seasons for the San Francisco 49ers.

Compton took five of eleven spots on the 1946 All-Metropolitan Conference football team. The honorees were Bev Wallace and John Finney at back; Robert Boyd and Gene Nordyke at end; and Fred (Floyd) Hopper at guard.

Coach Tay Brown led Compton to four Little Rose Bowl games, compiled a 140–33–9 record at the school, and was inducted into the College Football Hall of Fame in 1980.

The team played its home games at Ramsaur Stadium in Compton, California.

== Schedule ==
Date	Opponent	Site	Result	Attendance	Source
September 29	San Diego Navy*	Ramsaur Stadium; Compton, CA	W 39–7		
October 4	at Ventura	Ventura, CA	W 13–0		
October 11	Idaho Southern Branch*	Ramsaur Stadium; Compton, CA	W 38–0	10,000	
October 18	Long Beach	Ramsaur Stadium; Compton, CA	W 20–18		
October 25	Santa Monica	Ramsaur Stadium; Compton, CA	W 26–0	12,000	
November 1	at Bakersfield	Bakersfield, CA	W 40–25		
November 8	at Branch Agricultural College*	Cedar City, UT	W 26–18		
November 18	Glendale (CA)	Ramsaur Stadium; Compton, CA	W 19–0	10,000	
November 22	Pasadena	Ramsaur Stadium; Compton, CA	W 38–7		
November 27	Los Angeles City	Ramsaur Stadium; Compton, CA	L 6–19	12,000	
December 7	vs. Kilgore*	Rose Bowl; Pasadena, CA (Little Rose Bowl)	W 19–0	51,000	
*Non-conference game
