= 1955 Compton Tartars football team =

American college football season

1955 Compton Tartars football

Junior college national champion WSC champion Junior Rose Bowl champion

Junior Rose Bowl, W 22–13 vs. Jones County
- Conference: Western State Conference
- Record: 11–0 (5–0 WSC)
- Head coach: Tay Brown (16th season)
- Home stadium: Ramsaur Stadium

1955 Western State Conference football standings
| | Conf. | | | | | Overall |
| Team | W | | L | | T | W | | L | | T |
|---|---|---|---|---|---|---|---|---|---|---|
| Compton $ | 5 | – | 0 | – | 0 | 11 | – | 0 | – | 0 |
| Pasadena | 4 | – | 1 | – | 0 | 8 | – | 3 | – | 0 |
| Los Angeles City | 3 | – | 2 | – | 0 | 5 | – | 4 | – | 1 |
| Ventura | 2 | – | 3 | – | 0 | 4 | – | 6 | – | 0 |
| Glendale | 1 | – | 4 | – | 0 | 3 | – | 7 | – | 0 |
| Pierce | 0 | – | 5 | – | 0 | 2 | – | 6 | – | 1 |
$ – Conference champion; Glendale forfeited a non-conference win over Los Angeles Valley.

The 1955 Compton Tartars football team was an American football team that represented Compton College as a member of the Western State Conference (WSC) during the 1955 junior college football season. In their 16th-year under head coach Tay Brown, the Tartars compiled a perfect 11–0 record (5–0 in conference games), won the WSC championship, defeated Jones County in the Junior Rose Bowl, and outscored all opponents by a total of 403 to 63.

At the end of the regular season, Compton was ranked No. 1 and Jones County No. 2 in the junior college rankings. With its victory over Jones County in the Junior Rose Bowl, Compton was acknowledged as the junior college national champion.

Halfback Jim Waddell set the school's single game rushing record with 317 yards, scored 107 points, and ranked with the school's all-time rushing and scoring leaders (and Pro Football Hall of Fame inductees), Hugh McElhenny and Joe Perry.

Compton placed five players on the first team of the 1955 All-Western State Conference football team: Jim Waddell and Lee Mack at back; Jack Atwood at center; Dick Long at guard; and David Main at tackle. Four others were named to the second team: Bunny Aldrich at back; Marvin Perz at guard; Joe Lewis at tackle; and Charles McNeil at end. Lee Mack scored nine touchdowns in the first eight games of the season, but missed the remainder of the season after fracturing his hip in the game against Glendale.

The team played its home games at Ramsaur Stadium in Compton, California.

== Schedule ==
| Date | Opponent | Site | Result | Attendance | Source |
|---|---|---|---|---|---|
| September 25 | Long Beach Navy* | | W 28–0 | | |
| October 1 | Stockton* | Ramsaur Stadium; Compton, CA | W 32–2 | | |
| October 8 | at Oregon Tech* | Modoc Field; Klamath Falls, OR | W 60–7 | | |
| October 15 | Pierce | Ramsaur Stadium; Compton, CA | W 66–0 | | |
| October 21 | at Ventura | Poli Stadium; Ventura, CA | W 13–7 | | |
| October 29 | at Hartnell* | Salinas, CA | W 28–0 | | |
| November 5 | Weber* | Ramsaur Stadium; Compton, CA | W 63–14 | | |
| November 11 | at Glendale (CA) | Glendale HS; Glendale, CA | W 26–0 | | |
| November 17 | Los Angeles City | Ramsaur Stadium; Compton, CA | W 20–2 | | |
| November 23 | at Pasadena | Rose Bowl; Pasadena, CA | W 45–18 | 12,227 | |
| December 10 | vs. Jones County* | Rose Bowl; Pasadena, CA (Junior Rose Bowl) | W 22–13 | 57,132 | |
*Non-conference game
