= Metropolitan Conference (California) =

Junior college athletic conference in Southern California

The Metropolitan Conference was a junior college athletic conference with member schools located in Southern California. The conference was formed in 1938 by the Southern Conference Junior College Association. The conference's initial members were Bakersfield College, Compton College, Glendale Junior College, Long Beach City College, Los Angeles City College, Pasadena Junior College, Santa Monica College, Taft College, and Ventura College.

== Year football standings ==
1938 Western Junior College Conference football standings
	Conf.					Overall
Team	W		L		T	W		L		T
Pasadena +	5	–	0	–	0	11	–	0	–	0
Santa Monica +	5	–	0	–	0	?	–	?	–	?
Compton	3	–	1	–	0	?	–	?	–	?
Bakersfield	4	–	2	–	0	6	–	3	–	0
Los Angeles City	3	–	3	–	0	?	–	?	–	?
Ventura	3	–	4	–	0	6	–	5	–	0
Glendale (CA)	2	–	5	–	0	?	–	?	–	?
Taft	1	–	5	–	0	?	–	?	–	?
Long Beach	0	–	6	–	0	?	–	?	–	?
+ – Conference co-champions

1939 Metropolitan Conference football standings
	Conf.					Overall
Team	W		L		T	W		L		T
Compton $	3	–	1	–	0	?	–	?	–	?
Long Beach	3	–	1	–	2	?	–	?	–	?
Los Angeles City	2	–	1	–	1	?	–	?	–	?
Santa Monica	3	–	2	–	0	?	–	?	–	?
Pasadena	1	–	1	–	0	?	–	?	–	?
Ventura	2	–	3	–	0	?	–	?	–	?
Glendale (CA)	1	–	3	–	1	?	–	?	–	?
Bakersfield	1	–	4	–	0	3	–	4	–	1
$ – Conference champion

1940 Metropolitan Conference football standings
	Conf.					Overall
Team	W		L		T	W		L		T
Compton +	5	–	0	–	1	?	–	?	–	?
Los Angeles City +	5	–	0	–	1	?	–	?	–	?
Long Beach	3	–	1	–	2	?	–	?	–	?
Glendale (CA)	3	–	3	–	0	?	–	?	–	?
Ventura	2	–	3	–	1	?	–	?	–	?
Bakersfield	1	–	5	–	0	3	–	5	–	0
Santa Monica	0	–	5	–	1	?	–	?	–	?
+ – Conference co-champions

1941 Metropolitan Conference football standings
	Conf.					Overall
Team	W		L		T	W		L		T
Los Angeles City $	6	–	0	–	0	10	–	0	–	0
Ventura	4	–	2	–	0	6	–	4	–	0
Bakersfield	3	–	3	–	0	5	–	4	–	1
Compton	2	–	3	–	1	?	–	?	–	?
Long Beach	2	–	3	–	1	?	–	?	–	?
Santa Monica	2	–	4	–	0	?	–	?	–	?
Glendale (CA)	1	–	5	–	0	?	–	?	–	?
$ – Conference champion

1942 Metropolitan Conference football standings
	Conf.					Overall
Team	W		L		T	W		L		T
Pasadena $	6	–	0	–	0	?	–	?	–	?
Long Beach	4	–	1	–	1	?	–	?	–	?
Bakersfield	4	–	2	–	0	7	–	2	–	0
Los Angeles City	3	–	2	–	1	?	–	?	–	?
Compton	2	–	4	–	0	?	–	?	–	?
Glendale (CA)	1	–	5	–	0	?	–	?	–	?
Santa Monica	0	–	6	–	0	?	–	?	–	?
$ – Conference champion

1946 Metropolitan Conference football standings
	Conf.					Overall
Team	W		L		T	W		L		T
Compton $	6	–	1	–	0	10	–	1	–	0
Santa Monica	5	–	1	–	1	6	–	2	–	1
Long Beach	5	–	2	–	0	9	–	2	–	0
Los Angeles City	4	–	2	–	1	6	–	3	–	1
Bakersfield	4	–	3	–	0	7	–	3	–	1
Ventura	1	–	5	–	1	4	–	5	–	1
Glendale (CA)	1	–	5	–	1	2	–	7	–	1
Pasadena	0	–	7	–	0	0	–	9	–	1
$ – Conference champion

1947 Metropolitan Conference football standings
	Conf.					Overall
Team	W		L		T	W		L		T
Bakersfield $	3	–	1	–	0	9	–	1	–	0
Santa Monica	3	–	1	–	0	5	–	5	–	0
El Camino	1	–	2	–	1	7	–	2	–	1
Glendale (CA)	1	–	2	–	1	4	–	5	–	1
East Los Angeles	1	–	3	–	0	3	–	6	–	0
$ – Conference champion

1948 Metropolitan Conference football standings
	Conf.					Overall
Team	W		L		T	W		L		T
San Diego Junior College $	4	–	0	–	0	8	–	1	–	0
East Los Angeles	3	–	1	–	0	5	–	5	–	0
Bakersfield	2	–	2	–	0	6	–	4	–	0
Santa Monica	1	–	3	–	0	1	–	9	–	0
El Camino	0	–	4	–	0	3	–	7	–	0
$ – Conference champion

1949 Metropolitan Conference football standings
	Conf.					Overall
Team	W		L		T	W		L		T
East Los Angeles $	4	–	0	–	0	10	–	0	–	0
San Diego Junior College	3	–	1	–	0	8	–	2	–	0
El Camino	2	–	2	–	0	7	–	3	–	0
Bakersfield	1	–	3	–	0	3	–	6	–	1
Santa Monica	0	–	4	–	0	3	–	6	–	0
$ – Conference champion

1950 Metropolitan Conference football standings
	Conf.					Overall
Team	W		L		T	W		L		T
El Camino $	5	–	1	–	0	8	–	1	–	1
East Los Angeles	5	–	2	–	0	8	–	2	–	0
Harbor	3	–	2	–	1	4	–	3	–	1
San Diego Junior College	3	–	4	–	0	3	–	8	–	0
Bakersfield	2	–	3	–	1	6	–	4	–	1
Santa Monica	1	–	6	–	0	1	–	9	–	0
Los Angeles Valley	0	–	5	–	0	1	–	8	–	0
Long Beach *	4	–	0	–	0	9	–	0	–	0
$ – Conference champion; * – ineligible for conference title

1951 Metropolitan Conference football standings
	Conf.					Overall
Team	W		L		T	W		L		T
Long Beach $	5	–	0	–	1	8	–	1	–	1
Bakersfield	5	–	1	–	0	8	–	3	–	0
East Los Angeles	4	–	2	–	0	6	–	4	–	0
Harbor	3	–	2	–	1	6	–	3	–	1
Santa Monica	1	–	5	–	0	3	–	7	–	0
San Diego Junior College	1	–	5	–	0	2	–	6	–	0
El Camino	1	–	5	–	0	1	–	9	–	0
Los Angeles Valley			–			1	–	7	–	0
$ – Conference champion; Los Angeles Valley had a record 1–4 against conference opponents, but since the team did not play a full league schedule, those games did not count in the conference standings.

1952 Metropolitan Conference football standings
	Conf.					Overall
Team	W		L		T	W		L		T
El Camino $	7	–	0	–	0	8	–	1	–	0
Los Angeles Valley	5	–	1	–	1	8	–	1	–	1
East Los Angeles	5	–	1	–	1	7	–	1	–	2
Bakersfield	3	–	4	–	0	8	–	4	–	0
Santa Monica	3	–	4	–	0	3	–	6	–	0
Long Beach	2	–	5	–	0	3	–	7	–	0
Harbor	1	–	6	–	0	1	–	8	–	0
San Diego Junior College	1	–	6	–	0	1	–	8	–	0
$ – Conference champion

1953 Metropolitan Conference football standings
	Conf.					Overall
Team	W		L		T	W		L		T
Bakersfield $	7	–	0	–	0	12	–	0	–	0
Los Angeles Valley	5	–	2	–	0	6	–	4	–	0
El Camino	4	–	3	–	0	6	–	3	–	0
San Diego Junior College	4	–	3	–	0	6	–	4	–	0
Long Beach	3	–	4	–	0	4	–	5	–	0
Santa Monica	2	–	4	–	1	3	–	5	–	1
Harbor	2	–	5	–	0	2	–	8	–	0
East Los Angeles	0	–	6	–	1	0	–	9	–	1
$ – Conference champion

1954 Metropolitan Conference football standings
	Conf.					Overall
Team	W		L		T	W		L		T
El Camino $	7	–	0	–	0	9	–	1	–	0
Bakersfield	6	–	1	–	0	9	–	1	–	0
East Los Angeles	4	–	3	–	0	5	–	5	–	0
San Diego Junior College	4	–	3	–	0	4	–	5	–	0
Los Angeles Valley	2	–	5	–	0	4	–	6	–	0
Harbor	2	–	5	–	0	3	–	7	–	0
Santa Monica	2	–	5	–	0	3	–	7	–	0
Long Beach	1	–	6	–	0	3	–	7	–	0
$ – Conference champion

1955 Metropolitan Conference football standings
	Conf.					Overall
Team	W		L		T	W		L		T
Los Angeles Valley $	6	–	1	–	0	9	–	1	–	0
Bakersfield	5	–	1	–	1	10	–	1	–	1
El Camino	5	–	1	–	1	7	–	1	–	2
East Los Angeles	4	–	3	–	0	6	–	3	–	0
Harbor	3	–	3	–	1	4	–	3	–	2
San Diego Junior College	2	–	5	–	0	5	–	5	–	0
Santa Monica	1	–	5	–	1	3	–	5	–	1
Long Beach	0	–	7	–	0	2	–	8	–	0
$ – Conference champion; Glendale (CA) forfeited a non-conference win over Los Angeles Valley.

1956 Metropolitan Conference football standings
	Conf.					Overall
Team	W		L		T	W		L		T
Bakersfield $	5	–	2	–	0	6	–	3	–	0
Los Angeles Valley	4	–	2	–	1	6	–	2	–	1
Santa Monica	4	–	2	–	1	6	–	2	–	1
El Camino	4	–	3	–	0	7	–	3	–	0
Long Beach	4	–	3	–	0	6	–	3	–	0
East Los Angeles	4	–	3	–	0	5	–	4	–	0
San Diego Junior College	2	–	5	–	0	3	–	6	–	0
Harbor	0	–	7	–	0	2	–	7	–	0
$ – Conference champion

1957 Metropolitan Conference football standings
	Conf.					Overall
Team	W		L		T	W		L		T
San Diego Junior College $	6	–	1	–	0	7	–	2	–	0
Bakersfield	5	–	1	–	1	8	–	1	–	1
Long Beach	4	–	2	–	1	5	–	3	–	1
East Los Angeles	4	–	3	–	0	6	–	3	–	0
Santa Monica	3	–	4	–	0	4	–	5	–	0
El Camino	2	–	5	–	0	4	–	5	–	0
Los Angeles Valley	2	–	5	–	0	2	–	7	–	0
Harbor	1	–	6	–	0	1	–	7	–	1
$ – Conference champion

1958 Metropolitan Conference football standings
	Conf.					Overall
Team	W		L		T	W		L		T
Santa Monica $	7	–	0	–	0	10	–	0	–	0
Bakersfield	6	–	1	–	0	9	–	1	–	0
Long Beach	4	–	2	–	0	6	–	3	–	0
San Diego Junior College	4	–	3	–	0	6	–	3	–	0
Los Angeles Valley	3	–	4	–	0	4	–	5	–	0
El Camino	2	–	4	–	0	3	–	5	–	0
East Los Angeles	1	–	6	–	0	3	–	6	–	0
Harbor	0	–	7	–	0	2	–	7	–	0
$ – Conference champion; The game between Long Beach and El Camino on November 22 was stopped in the third quarter because of fog. The conference ruled the game a no contest.

1959 Metropolitan Conference football standings
	Conf.					Overall
Team	W		L		T	W		L		T
Bakersfield $	7	–	0	–	0	10	–	0	–	0
Santa Monica	5	–	2	–	0	7	–	2	–	0
San Diego Junior College	4	–	3	–	0	5	–	4	–	0
Los Angeles Valley	4	–	3	–	0	4	–	5	–	0
El Camino	3	–	4	–	0	5	–	4	–	0
Long Beach	3	–	4	–	0	4	–	5	–	0
Harbor	2	–	5	–	0	2	–	6	–	1
East Los Angeles	0	–	7	–	0	1	–	8	–	0
$ – Conference champion

1960 Metropolitan Conference football standings
	Conf.					Overall
Team	W		L		T	W		L		T
Long Beach $	7	–	0	–	0	10	–	0	–	0
Bakersfield	6	–	1	–	0	9	–	1	–	0
Santa Monica	5	–	2	–	0	7	–	2	–	0
El Camino	4	–	3	–	0	5	–	4	–	0
East Los Angeles	3	–	4	–	0	5	–	4	–	0
San Diego Junior College	2	–	5	–	0	3	–	6	–	0
Los Angeles Valley	1	–	6	–	0	1	–	8	–	0
Harbor	0	–	7	–	0	0	–	9	–	0
$ – Conference champion

1961 Metropolitan Conference football standings
	Conf.					Overall
Team	W		L		T	W		L		T
Bakersfield $	7	–	0	–	0	9	–	1	–	0
Santa Monica	6	–	1	–	0	8	–	1	–	0
Long Beach	5	–	2	–	0	7	–	2	–	0
El Camino	4	–	3	–	0	5	–	4	–	0
San Diego Junior College	2	–	4	–	1	3	–	5	–	1
Harbor	2	–	5	–	0	4	–	5	–	0
East Los Angeles	1	–	5	–	1	1	–	7	–	1
Los Angeles Valley	0	–	7	–	0	0	–	9	–	0
$ – Conference champion

1962 Metropolitan Conference football standings
	Conf.					Overall
Team	W		L		T	W		L		T
Long Beach $	6	–	0	–	1	9	–	0	–	1
Bakersfield	5	–	1	–	1	6	–	2	–	1
El Camino	5	–	2	–	0	7	–	2	–	0
Cerritos	4	–	3	–	0	6	–	3	–	0
Santa Monica	4	–	3	–	0	5	–	4	–	0
East Los Angeles	1	–	6	–	0	3	–	6	–	0
San Diego Junior College	1	–	6	–	0	3	–	6	–	0
Los Angeles Valley	1	–	6	–	0	1	–	8	–	0
$ – Conference champion

1963 Metropolitan Conference football standings
	Conf.					Overall
Team	W		L		T	W		L		T
Bakersfield +	6	–	1	–	0	9	–	1	–	0
Long Beach +	6	–	1	–	0	7	–	2	–	0
Cerritos	5	–	2	–	0	7	–	2	–	0
El Camino	4	–	3	–	0	6	–	3	–	0
San Diego Junior College	3	–	4	–	0	5	–	5	–	0
Santa Monica	3	–	4	–	0	4	–	5	–	0
Los Angeles Valley	1	–	6	–	0	2	–	7	–	0
East Los Angeles	0	–	7	–	0	0	–	9	–	0
$ – Conference champion

1964 Metropolitan Conference football standings
	Conf.					Overall
Team	W		L		T	W		L		T
Long Beach $	6	–	0	–	0	10	–	0	–	0
Bakersfield	5	–	1	–	0	8	–	2	–	0
El Camino	3	–	3	–	0	6	–	3	–	0
Cerritos	3	–	3	–	0	5	–	4	–	0
Los Angeles Valley	2	–	4	–	0	4	–	5	–	0
Santa Monica	2	–	4	–	0	4	–	5	–	0
East Los Angeles	0	–	6	–	0	1	–	8	–	0
$ – Conference champion

1965 Metropolitan Conference football standings
	Conf.					Overall
Team	W		L		T	W		L		T
Cerritos $	6	–	0	–	0	10	–	0	–	0
Long Beach	5	–	1	–	0	7	–	2	–	1
Bakersfield	4	–	2	–	0	7	–	2	–	0
El Camino	2	–	3	–	1	5	–	3	–	1
Los Angeles Valley	2	–	4	–	0	5	–	4	–	0
Santa Monica	1	–	4	–	1	3	–	5	–	1
East Los Angeles	0	–	6	–	0	0	–	9	–	0
$ – Conference champion

1966 Metropolitan Conference football standings
	Conf.					Overall
Team	W		L		T	W		L		T
Santa Monica $	7	–	0	–	0	8	–	0	–	1
Cerritos	5	–	1	–	1	6	–	2	–	1
Bakersfield	5	–	2	–	0	7	–	2	–	0
El Camino	3	–	2	–	2	5	–	2	–	2
Long Beach	3	–	3	–	1	5	–	3	–	1
Rio Hondo	2	–	5	–	0	2	–	7	–	0
East Los Angeles	1	–	6	–	0	1	–	8	–	0
Los Angeles Valley	0	–	7	–	0	1	–	8	–	0
$ – Conference champion

1967 Metropolitan Conference football standings
	Conf.					Overall
Team	W		L		T	W		L		T
Bakersfield $^	7	–	0	–	0	9	–	1	–	0
El Camino	6	–	1	–	0	8	–	1	–	0
Long Beach	3	–	3	–	1	5	–	3	–	1
Santa Monica	3	–	3	–	1	5	–	3	–	1
Cerritos	2	–	4	–	1	4	–	4	–	1
Los Angeles Valley	2	–	4	–	1	3	–	5	–	0
East Los Angeles	2	–	5	–	0	3	–	6	–	0
Rio Hondo	1	–	5	–	0	3	–	6	–	0
$ – Conference champion; ^ – California state junior college large division playoff participant

1968 Metropolitan Conference football standings
	Conf.					Overall
Team	W		L		T	W		L		T
El Camino $^	7	–	0	–	0	10	–	1	–	0
Bakersfield	6	–	1	–	0	8	–	1	–	0
Long Beach	5	–	2	–	0	6	–	2	–	1
Santa Monica	4	–	3	–	0	6	–	3	–	0
Cerritos	3	–	4	–	0	3	–	6	–	0
Pasadena	1	–	6	–	0	3	–	6	–	0
Los Angeles Valley	1	–	6	–	0	2	–	7	–	0
Pierce	1	–	6	–	0	1	–	8	–	0
$ – Conference champion; ^ – California state junior college large division playoff participant

1969 Metropolitan Conference football standings
	Conf.					Overall
Team	W		L		T	W		L		T
Bakersfield $^	6	–	0	–	0	10	–	1	–	0
El Camino	5	–	1	–	0	7	–	2	–	0
Los Angeles Valley	3	–	3	–	0	6	–	4	–	0
Pasadena	3	–	3	–	0	5	–	4	–	0
Santa Monica	2	–	4	–	0	5	–	4	–	0
Long Beach	2	–	4	–	0	2	–	7	–	0
Pierce	0	–	6	–	0	1	–	8	–	0
$ – Conference champion; ^ – California state junior college large division playoff participant Pasadena forfeited three conference wins, over Bakersfield, El Camino, and Los Angeles Valley, and a non-conference tie with Rio Hondo because of an ineligible player.

1970 Metropolitan Conference football standings
	Conf.					Overall
Team	W		L		T	W		L		T
Bakersfield $^	6	–	0	–	0	9	–	1	–	0
El Camino	4	–	2	–	0	6	–	3	–	0
Santa Monica	4	–	2	–	0	6	–	3	–	0
Pasadena	3	–	3	–	0	6	–	3	–	0
Pierce	3	–	3	–	0	4	–	5	–	0
Los Angeles Valley	1	–	5	–	0	2	–	7	–	0
Long Beach	0	–	6	–	0	0	–	9	–	0
$ – Conference champion; ^ – California state junior college large division playoff participant

1971 Metropolitan Conference football standings
	Conf.					Overall
Team	W		L		T	W		L		T
El Camino $^	6	–	0	–	0	11	–	1	–	0
Bakersfield	4	–	2	–	0	7	–	2	–	0
Pierce	4	–	2	–	0	7	–	2	–	0
Pasadena	3	–	3	–	0	6	–	3	–	0
Long Beach	2	–	4	–	0	5	–	5	–	0
Santa Monica	2	–	4	–	0	3	–	6	–	0
Los Angeles Valley	0	–	6	–	0	1	–	8	–	0
$ – Conference champion; ^ – California state junior college large division playoff participant

1972 Metropolitan Conference football standings
	Conf.					Overall
Team	W		L		T	W		L		T
Pasadena $^	5	–	0	–	0	12	–	1	–	0
El Camino	4	–	1	–	0	7	–	1	–	1
Long Beach	2	–	3	–	0	5	–	3	–	1
Pierce	2	–	3	–	0	5	–	5	–	0
Bakersfield	2	–	3	–	0	3	–	6	–	0
Los Angeles Valley	0	–	5	–	0	2	–	7	–	0
$ – Conference champion; ^ – California state junior college large division playoff participant

1973 Metropolitan Conference football standings
	Conf.					Overall
Team	W		L		T	W		L		T
Pierce +^	4	–	1	–	0	7	–	3	–	0
El Camino +	4	–	1	–	0	6	–	3	–	0
Long Beach	3	–	2	–	0	5	–	4	–	0
Bakersfield	2	–	3	–	0	6	–	4	–	0
Pasadena	2	–	3	–	0	5	–	5	–	0
Los Angeles Valley	0	–	5	–	0	1	–	8	–	0
+ – Conference co-champions; ^ – California state junior college large division playoff participant

1974 Metropolitan Conference football standings
	Conf.					Overall
Team	W		L		T	W		L		T
Pasadena $^	5	–	0	–	0	10	–	0	–	1
El Camino	4	–	1	–	0	8	–	1	–	1
Bakersfield	3	–	2	–	0	8	–	2	–	0
Long Beach	2	–	3	–	0	3	–	6	–	0
Pierce	1	–	4	–	0	3	–	6	–	0
Los Angeles Valley	0	–	5	–	0	3	–	5	–	1
$ – Conference champion; ^ – California state junior college Division I playoff participant

1975 Metropolitan Conference football standings
	Conf.					Overall
Team	W		L		T	W		L		T
Los Angeles Valley $	5	–	1	–	0	9	–	1	–	0
Long Beach	4	–	2	–	0	4	–	5	–	0
East Los Angeles	4	–	2	–	0	7	–	3	–	0
Bakersfield	3	–	2	–	1	7	–	2	–	1
El Camino	2	–	4	–	0	6	–	4	–	0
Pierce	2	–	4	–	0	6	–	4	–	0
Pasadena	0	–	5	–	1	4	–	5	–	1
$ – Conference champion

1976 Metropolitan Conference football standings
	Conf.					Overall
Team	W		L		T	W		L		T
Bakersfield $	6	–	0	–	0	11	–	1	–	0
Pierce	4	–	2	–	0	6	–	3	–	1
El Camino	4	–	2	–	0	6	–	3	–	0
Long Beach	3	–	3	–	0	4	–	5	–	0
Los Angeles Valley	2	–	4	–	0	5	–	4	–	0
East Los Angeles	1	–	5	–	0	4	–	6	–	0
Pasadena	1	–	5	–	0	3	–	6	–	0
$ – Conference champion

1977 Metropolitan Conference football standings
	Conf.					Overall
Team	W		L		T	W		L		T
Pasadena $	5	–	1	–	0	11	–	1	–	0
Bakersfield	4	–	2	–	0	7	–	4	–	0
El Camino	4	–	2	–	0	7	–	3	–	0
Los Angeles Valley	4	–	2	–	0	?	–	?	–	?
Long Beach	3	–	3	–	0	?	–	?	–	?
Pierce	1	–	5	–	0	?	–	?	–	?
East Los Angeles	0	–	6	–	0	?	–	?	–	?
$ – Conference champion

1978 Metropolitan Conference football standings
	Conf.					Overall
Team	W		L		T	W		L		T
Pasadena $	5	–	1	–	0	8	–	3	–	0
Pierce	4	–	2	–	0	8	–	2	–	0
El Camino	4	–	2	–	0	6	–	2	–	1
Bakersfield	3	–	3	–	0	6	–	4	–	0
Long Beach	3	–	3	–	0	5	–	5	–	0
Los Angeles Valley	2	–	4	–	0	3	–	6	–	0
East Los Angeles	0	–	6	–	0	1	–	9	–	0
$ – Conference champion

1979 Metropolitan Conference football standings
	Conf.					Overall
Team	W		L		T	W		L		T
Pasadena +	4	–	1	–	0	9	–	2	–	0
Pierce +	4	–	1	–	0	7	–	2	–	0
Bakersfield	3	–	2	–	0	7	–	4	–	0
El Camino	2	–	3	–	0	5	–	5	–	0
Los Angeles Valley	2	–	3	–	0	4	–	5	–	1
Long Beach	0	–	5	–	0	3	–	7	–	0
+ – Conference co-champions

1980 Metropolitan Conference football standings
	Conf.					Overall
Team	W		L		T	W		L		T
Pasadena +	6	–	0	–	0	10	–	1	–	0
El Camino	4	–	2	–	0	8	–	2	–	0
Taft	4	–	2	–	0	8	–	2	–	1
Long Beach	4	–	2	–	0	7	–	3	–	0
Bakersfield	2	–	4	–	0	3	–	6	–	1
Pierce	1	–	5	–	0	2	–	8	–	0
Los Angeles Valley	0	–	6	–	0	1	–	9	–	0
+ – Conference co-champions

1981 Metropolitan Conference football standings
	Conf.					Overall
Team	W		L		T	W		L		T
Bakersfield $	6	–	0	–	0	8	–	2	–	0
Santa Monica	4	–	2	–	0	7	–	3	–	0
Pasadena	4	–	2	–	0	6	–	4	–	0
Pierce	3	–	3	–	0	5	–	5	–	0
El Camino	3	–	3	–	0	3	–	6	–	0
Long Beach	2	–	4	–	0	4	–	6	–	0
Los Angeles Valley	0	–	6	–	0	0	–	10	–	0
$ – Conference champion

1983 Metropolitan Conference football standings
	Conf.					Overall
Team	W		L		T	W		L		T
Taft $	5	–	0	–	0	9	–	1	–	0
El Camino	3	–	2	–	0	7	–	3	–	0
Pasadena	3	–	2	–	0	6	–	3	–	0
Long Beach	3	–	2	–	0	5	–	5	–	0
Bakersfield	1	–	4	–	0	5	–	5	–	0
Santa Monica	0	–	5	–	0	3	–	5	–	0
$ – Conference champion
