= Pasadena Bowl =

College football bowl game

The Pasadena Bowl, known as the Junior Rose Bowl or Little Rose Bowl from 1946 to 1966 and again in 1976 and 1977, was a college football bowl game.

Between 1946 and 1966 and again in 1976 and 1977, the game pitted the California Junior College football champions against National Junior College Athletic Association (NJCAA) football teams (not always the champion). It was organized by the Pasadena Junior Chamber of Commerce.

The Junior Rose Bowl became the Pasadena Bowl from 1967 to 1971. It was billed as the Junior Rose Bowl the first two years, but now featured teams from the National Collegiate Athletic Association's College and University Divisions. The bowl featured the champion of the Pacific Coast Athletic Association (PCAA) from 1969 to 1970 and the champion of the Missouri Valley Conference in 1970 and 1971.

== Game results ==
Date	Winner		Loser		Location	Attendance	References
December 14, 1946	Compton	19	Kilgore	0	Pasadena, California	51,000	
December 13, 1947	Chaffey	39	Cameron	26	Pasadena, California	55,000	
December 11, 1948	Compton	48	Duluth	14	Pasadena, California	50,638	
December 10, 1949	Little Rock	25	Santa Ana	19	Pasadena, California	33,942	
December 9, 1950	Long Beach	33	Boise	13	Pasadena, California	47,525	
December 8, 1951	Pasadena	28	Tyler	26	Pasadena, California	41,971	
December 13, 1952	Hartnell	20	Bacone	20	Pasadena, California	35,392	
December 12, 1953	Bakersfield	13	Northeastern Oklahoma A&M	6	Pasadena, California	50,385	
December 11, 1954	Hinds	13	El Camino	7	Pasadena, California	61,559	
December 10, 1955	Compton	22	Jones County	13	Pasadena, California	57,132	
December 8, 1956	Arlington State	20	Compton	13	Pasadena, California	37,142	
December 14, 1957	Arlington State	21	Cerritos	12	Pasadena, California	36,008	
December 13, 1958	Santa Monica	30	Northeastern Oklahoma A&M	12	Pasadena, California	50,797	
December 12, 1959	Bakersfield	30	Del Mar	14	Pasadena, California	46,293	
December 10, 1960	Long Beach	38	Tyler	16	Pasadena, California	38,064	
December 9, 1961	Cameron	28	Bakersfield	20	Pasadena, California	49,023	
December 15, 1962	Santa Ana	20	Columbia Basin	0	Pasadena, California	41,709	
December 14, 1963	Orange Coast	21	Northeastern Oklahoma A&M	0	Pasadena, California	44,044	
December 12, 1964	Long Beach	28	Cameron	6	Pasadena, California	45,576	
December 11, 1965	Fullerton	20	Henderson County	15	Pasadena, California	50,098	
December 10, 1966	Henderson County	40	Pasadena	13	Pasadena, California	40,045	
December 2, 1967	West Texas State	35	Valley State	13	Pasadena, California	23,802	
December 7, 1968	Grambling	34	Sacramento State	7	Pasadena, California	34,127	
December 6, 1969	San Diego State	28	Boston University	7	Pasadena, California	41,276	
December 19, 1970	Louisville (tie)	24	Long Beach State (tie)	24	Pasadena, California	20,472	
December 18, 1971	Memphis State	28	San Jose State	9	Pasadena, California	15,244	
December 11, 1976	Bakersfield	29	Ellsworth	14	Pasadena, California	21,200	
December 10, 1977	Pasadena	38	Jones County	9	Pasadena, California	15,566	

== See also ==
- List of college bowl games
- Rose Bowl Game
