= Western State Conference =

Big Sky Conference

The Western State Conference (WSC) is a college athletic conference that is affiliated with the California Community College Athletic Association. The conference was established in 1950, making it the oldest community college conference in California. Its members are based primarily in the Greater Los Angeles Area, with several spread across neighboring Kern, Santa Barbara, San Bernardino, San Luis Obispo and Ventura counties.

== Members ==
The league currently has 18 full members:

Institution	Nickname	Location	Founded	Enrollment
Allan Hancock College	Allan Hancock Bulldogs	Santa Maria, California	1920	18,500
Antelope Valley College	Antelope Valley Marauders	Lancaster, California	1929	14,024
Bakersfield College	Bakersfield Renegades	Bakersfield, California	1913	15,000
Barstow Community College	Barstow Vikings	Barstow, California	1959	5,500
College of the Canyons	Canyons Cougars	Santa Clarita, California	1969	17,089
Citrus College	Citrus Owls	Glendora, California	1915	11,000
Cuesta College	Cuesta Cougars	San Luis Obispo, California	1963	11,150
Glendale Community College	Glendale Vaqueros	Glendale, California	1927	19,029
Los Angeles Mission College	Mission Eagles	Sylmar, California	1975	11,000
Los Angeles Pierce College	Pierce Brahmas	Woodland Hills, California	1947	18,000
Los Angeles Valley College	Valley Monarchs	Valley Glen, California	1949	17,000
Moorpark College	Moorpark Raiders	Moorpark, California	1963	15,400
Oxnard College	Oxnard Condors	Oxnard, California	1975	7,233
Santa Barbara City College	Santa Barbara Vaqueros	Santa Barbara, California	1909	17,000
Santa Monica College	Santa Monica Corsairs	Santa Monica, California	1929	32,000
Ventura College	Ventura Pirates	Ventura, California	1925	13,000
Victor Valley College	Victor Valley Rams	Victorville, California	1961	13,000
West Los Angeles College	West L.A. Wildcats	Culver City, California	1969	8,000

== Venues ==
School	Football stadium	Stadium capacity	Basketball arena	Arena capacity
Allan Hancock College	Hancock Football Stadium		Joe White Memorial Gymnasium	
Bakersfield College	Memorial Stadium	20,000	Gil Bishop Sports Center	
Barstow Community College	Non-Football School	N/A	James R. Parks Gymnasium	
College of the Canyons	Cougar Stadium	7,500	Cougar Cage	3,000
Citrus College	Citrus Stadium	10,000	The Owl's Nest	2,000
Cuesta College	Non-Football School	N/A		
Glendale College	Sartoris Field		Verdugo Gym	
Los Angeles Pierce College	John Shepard Stadium	5,500		
Los Angeles Valley College	Monarch Stadium	10,000		
Moorpark College	Griffin Stadium	6,000	Raider Pavilion	
Oxnard College	Non-Football School	N/A	Condor Center	
Santa Barbara City College	La Playa Stadium	10,000	Sports Pavilion	
Santa Monica College	Corsair Field	4,850	Corsair Pavilion	1,600
Ventura College	Ventura Sports Complex	3,000	Event Center	1,800
Victor Valley College	Hawks Stadium		Victor Valley College Gym	
West Los Angeles College	Wildcat Stadium		The Den	

== Sports offered ==
- Baseball (men's)
- Basketball (men's and women's)
- Cross Country (men's and women's)
- Football (men's)
- Golf (men's and women's)
- Soccer (men's and women's)
- Softball (women's)
- Swimming & Diving (men's and women's)
- Tennis (men's and women's)
- Track & Field (men's and women's)
- Volleyball (men's and women's)
- Water Polo (men's and women's)

== Football standings ==
1949 Western State Conference football standings
	Conf.					Overall
Team	W		L		T	W		L		T
Muir $	2	–	1	–	1	7	–	3	–	1
Compton	4	–	0	–	1	7	–	2	–	1
Los Angeles City	3	–	1	–	1	6	–	3	–	1
Pasadena	4	–	2	–	0	8	–	2	–	1
Glendale (CA)	2	–	3	–	0	3	–	5	–	1
Long Beach	1	–	4	–	0	2	–	6	–	1
Ventura	0	–	5	–	1	1	–	8	–	1
$ – Conference champion; The Compton vs. Muir game, won by the latter, was originally a conference matchup, but was ruled a no content by the conference. Muir forfeited a victory over Glendale.

1950 Western State Conference football standings
	Conf.					Overall
Team	W		L		T	W		L		T
Compton $	4	–	1	–	0	10	–	1	–	0
Ventura	3	–	1	–	1	6	–	3	–	1
Pasadena	3	–	2	–	0	6	–	3	–	1
Glendale (CA)	2	–	3	–	0	5	–	4	–	0
Los Angeles City	1	–	2	–	1	5	–	4	–	1
Muir	0	–	4	–	0	2	–	8	–	0
$ – Conference champion

1951 Western State Conference football standings
	Conf.					Overall
Team	W		L		T	W		L		T
Pasadena $	4	–	0	–	0	12	–	0	–	0
Compton	3	–	1	–	0	10	–	1	–	0
Los Angeles City	1	–	2	–	1	4	–	5	–	1
Ventura	1	–	3	–	0	8	–	3	–	0
Glendale (CA)	0	–	3	–	1	2	–	7	–	1
Muir			–			6	–	4	–	0
$ – Conference champion; Muir had a record of 3–1 against conference opponents, but those games were not counted in the conference standings because the team did not play a complete league schedule.

1952 Western State Conference football standings
	Conf.					Overall
Team	W		L		T	W		L		T
Compton $	5	–	0	–	0	9	–	0	–	1
Pasadena	4	–	1	–	0	8	–	2	–	0
Glendale	3	–	2	–	0	5	–	4	–	0
Ventura	1	–	4	–	0	2	–	8	–	1
Muir	1	–	4	–	0	2	–	8	–	0
Los Angeles City	1	–	4	–	0	1	–	7	–	0
$ – Conference champion

1953 Western State Conference football standings
	Conf.					Overall
Team	W		L		T	W		L		T
Pasadena $	5	–	0	–	0	10	–	0	–	0
Glendale	3	–	1	–	1	5	–	3	–	1
Compton	2	–	2	–	1	5	–	4	–	2
Muir	2	–	2	–	1	4	–	6	–	1
Los Angeles City	1	–	4	–	0	1	–	6	–	1
Ventura	0	–	4	–	1	1	–	8	–	1
$ – Conference champion

1954 Western State Conference football standings
	Conf.					Overall
Team	W		L		T	W		L		T
Compton $	4	–	0	–	0	9	–	0	–	1
Pasadena	3	–	1	–	0	7	–	3	–	0
Glendale	2	–	2	–	0	3	–	4	–	1
Ventura	1	–	3	–	0	3	–	6	–	0
Los Angeles City	0	–	4	–	0	1	–	8	–	0
$ – Conference champion

1955 Western State Conference football standings
	Conf.					Overall
Team	W		L		T	W		L		T
Compton $	5	–	0	–	0	11	–	0	–	0
Pasadena	4	–	1	–	0	8	–	3	–	0
Los Angeles City	3	–	2	–	0	5	–	4	–	1
Ventura	2	–	3	–	0	4	–	6	–	0
Glendale	1	–	4	–	0	3	–	7	–	0
Pierce	0	–	5	–	0	2	–	6	–	1
$ – Conference champion; Glendale forfeited a non-conference win over Los Angeles Valley.

1956 Western State Conference football standings
	Conf.					Overall
Team	W		L		T	W		L		T
Compton $	5	–	0	–	0	10	–	1	–	0
Pasadena	4	–	1	–	0	8	–	1	–	0
Glendale	3	–	2	–	0	5	–	4	–	0
Ventura	2	–	3	–	0	3	–	6	–	0
Los Angeles City	1	–	4	–	0	4	–	5	–	0
Pierce	0	–	5	–	0	2	–	6	–	1
$ – Conference champion

1957 Western State Conference football standings
	Conf.					Overall
Team	W		L		T	W		L		T
Compton $	5	–	1	–	0	7	–	2	–	0
Cerritos	5	–	1	–	0	8	–	2	–	0
Los Angeles City	4	–	2	–	0	7	–	2	–	0
Glendale	3	–	2	–	1	5	–	2	–	1
Pierce	2	–	4	–	0	3	–	6	–	0
Pasadena	1	–	4	–	1	1	–	6	–	2
Ventura	0	–	6	–	0	2	–	7	–	0
$ – Conference champion

1958 Western State Conference football standings
	Conf.					Overall
Team	W		L		T	W		L		T
Cerritos $	6	–	0	–	0	8	–	1	–	0
Compton	5	–	1	–	0	7	–	2	–	0
Pierce	3	–	3	–	0	6	–	3	–	0
Los Angeles City	2	–	4	–	0	4	–	5	–	0
Pasadena	2	–	4	–	0	2	–	7	–	0
Ventura	2	–	4	–	0	2	–	7	–	0
Glendale (CA)	1	–	5	–	0	1	–	8	–	0
$ – Conference champion

1959 Western State Conference football standings
	Conf.					Overall
Team	W		L		T	W		L		T
Cerritos +	5	–	1	–	0	8	–	1	–	0
Pierce +	5	–	1	–	0	7	–	3	–	0
Compton +	5	–	1	–	0	5	–	4	–	0
Los Angeles City	3	–	3	–	0	7	–	2	–	0
Ventura	1	–	5	–	0	2	–	7	–	0
Glendale (CA)	1	–	5	–	0	1	–	8	–	0
Pasadena	1	–	5	–	0	1	–	8	–	0
+ – Conference co-champions

1960 Western State Conference football standings
	Conf.					Overall
Team	W		L		T	W		L		T
Cerritos $	7	–	0	–	0	8	–	2	–	0
Glendale (CA)	5	–	2	–	0	7	–	2	–	0
Phoenix	5	–	2	–	0	7	–	2	–	0
Pierce	4	–	3	–	0	4	–	5	–	0
Compton	2	–	5	–	0	5	–	5	–	0
Los Angeles City	2	–	5	–	0	2	–	7	–	0
Pasadena	2	–	5	–	0	2	–	8	–	0
Ventura	1	–	6	–	0	1	–	8	–	0
$ – Conference champion

1961 Western State Conference football standings
	Conf.					Overall
Team	W		L		T	W		L		T
Glendale (CA) $	6	–	1	–	0	9	–	1	–	0
Cerritos	5	–	1	–	1	5	–	3	–	1
Phoenix	4	–	2	–	1	6	–	2	–	1
Compton	4	–	3	–	0	4	–	4	–	0
Los Angeles City	3	–	3	–	1	4	–	4	–	1
Pasadena	3	–	4	–	0	5	–	4	–	0
Pierce	1	–	5	–	1	2	–	6	–	1
Ventura	0	–	7	–	0	0	–	9	–	0
$ – Conference champion

1962 Western State Conference football standings
	Conf.					Overall
Team	W		L		T	W		L		T
Glendale (CA) $	6	–	0	–	0	7	–	2	–	0
Pierce	5	–	1	–	0	5	–	4	–	0
Los Angeles City	3	–	3	–	0	3	–	3	–	0
Compton	3	–	3	–	0	3	–	5	–	0
Pasadena	2	–	4	–	0	2	–	6	–	0
Harbor	1	–	5	–	0	2	–	7	–	0
Ventura	1	–	5	–	0	1	–	8	–	0
$ – Conference champion

1963 Western State Conference football standings
	Conf.					Overall
Team	W		L		T	W		L		T
Glendale (CA) $	5	–	0	–	1	7	–	1	–	1
Harbor	4	–	2	–	0	6	–	3	–	0
Compton	3	–	2	–	1	4	–	4	–	1
Los Angeles City	2	–	3	–	1	4	–	4	–	1
Pierce	2	–	3	–	1	2	–	6	–	1
Pasadena	2	–	4	–	0	3	–	6	–	0
Ventura	1	–	5	–	0	1	–	8	–	0
$ – Conference champion

1964 Western State Conference football standings
	Conf.					Overall
Team	W		L		T	W		L		T
Harbor $	6	–	0	–	0	9	–	0	–	0
Glendale (CA)	4	–	1	–	1	5	–	3	–	1
Ventura	4	–	2	–	0	6	–	4	–	0
Pierce	3	–	3	–	0	3	–	6	–	0
Pasadena	2	–	4	–	0	3	–	6	–	0
Los Angeles City	1	–	5	–	0	2	–	6	–	1
Compton	0	–	5	–	1	0	–	9	–	1
$ – Conference champion

1965 Western State Conference football standings
	Conf.					Overall
Team	W		L		T	W		L		T
Ventura $	6	–	1	–	0	8	–	2	–	0
Harbor	5	–	2	–	0	8	–	2	–	0
Glendale (CA)	5	–	2	–	0	7	–	2	–	0
Pasadena	4	–	3	–	0	6	–	3	–	0
Pierce	4	–	3	–	0	4	–	5	–	0
Los Angeles City	3	–	4	–	0	5	–	4	–	0
Santa Barbara City	1	–	6	–	0	2	–	7	–	0
Compton	0	–	7	–	0	1	–	8	–	0
$ – Conference champion

1966 Western State Conference football standings
	Conf.					Overall
Team	W		L		T	W		L		T
Pasadena $	6	–	0	–	1	8	–	1	–	1
Harbor	5	–	2	–	0	6	–	3	–	0
Los Angeles City	4	–	2	–	1	6	–	2	–	1
Ventura	4	–	3	–	0	5	–	4	–	0
Glendale (CA)	3	–	4	–	0	4	–	4	–	1
Pierce	3	–	4	–	0	4	–	5	–	0
Santa Barbara City	2	–	5	–	0	4	–	5	–	0
Compton	0	–	7	–	0	1	–	8	–	0
$ – Conference champion

1967 Western State Conference football standings
	Conf.					Overall
Team	W		L		T	W		L		T
Pierce $^	6	–	1	–	0	6	–	4	–	0
Pasadena	5	–	2	–	0	6	–	3	–	0
Ventura	4	–	3	–	0	6	–	3	–	0
Glendale (CA)	4	–	3	–	0	5	–	4	–	0
Harbor	4	–	3	–	0	4	–	5	–	0
Santa Barbara City	3	–	4	–	0	4	–	5	–	0
Compton	1	–	6	–	0	2	–	6	–	1
Los Angeles City	1	–	6	–	0	1	–	9	–	0
$ – Conference champion; ^ – California state junior college large division playoff participant

1968 Western State Conference football standings
	Conf.					Overall
Team	W		L		T	W		L		T
East Los Angeles $^	7	–	0	–	0	11	–	1	–	0
Ventura	6	–	1	–	0	7	–	1	–	1
Los Angeles City	5	–	2	–	0	6	–	3	–	0
Harbor	4	–	3	–	0	5	–	4	–	0
Glendale (CA)	3	–	4	–	0	3	–	6	–	0
Moorpark	2	–	5	–	0	3	–	6	–	0
Compton	1	–	6	–	0	2	–	7	–	0
Santa Barbara City	0	–	7	–	0	1	–	8	–	0
$ – Conference champion; ^ – California state junior college large division playoff participant

1969 Western State Conference football standings
	Conf.					Overall
Team	W		L		T	W		L		T
Ventura +	4	–	1	–	0	7	–	2	–	0
Santa Barbara City +^	4	–	1	–	0	7	–	3	–	0
Glendale (CA)	3	–	2	–	0	3	–	6	–	0
Moorpark	2	–	3	–	0	4	–	5	–	0
Compton	2	–	3	–	0	2	–	7	–	1
Antelope Valley	0	–	5	–	0	1	–	8	–	0
+ – Conference co-champions; ^ – California state junior college large division playoff participant

1970 Western State Conference football standings
	Conf.					Overall
Team	W		L		T	W		L		T
Moorpark +	4	–	2	–	0	6	–	2	–	0
Santa Barbara City +^	4	–	2	–	0	5	–	5	–	0
Compton +	4	–	2	–	0	4	–	5	–	0
West Los Angeles	3	–	3	–	0	6	–	3	–	0
Ventura	3	–	3	–	0	4	–	5	–	0
Glendale (CA)	2	–	4	–	0	2	–	7	–	0
Antelope Valley	1	–	5	–	0	3	–	6	–	0
+ – Conference co-champions; ^ – California state junior college large division playoff participant

1971 Western State Conference football standings
	Conf.					Overall
Team	W		L		T	W		L		T
Santa Barbara City $^	6	–	0	–	0	9	–	2	–	0
Moorpark	4	–	2	–	0	7	–	3	–	0
Compton	4	–	2	–	0	5	–	5	–	0
West Los Angeles	3	–	3	–	0	5	–	4	–	0
Ventura	2	–	4	–	0	4	–	5	–	0
Glendale (CA)	2	–	4	–	0	4	–	5	–	0
Antelope Valley	0	–	6	–	0	2	–	7	–	0
$ – Conference champion; ^ – California state junior college large division playoff participant

1972 Western State Conference football standings
	Conf.					Overall
Team	W		L		T	W		L		T
Santa Barbara City +	6	–	1	–	0	9	–	1	–	0
West Los Angeles +^	6	–	1	–	0	7	–	3	–	0
Ventura	5	–	2	–	0	7	–	3	–	0
Hancock	4	–	2	–	1	6	–	2	–	1
College of the Canyons	3	–	3	–	1	5	–	3	–	1
Moorpark	2	–	5	–	0	4	–	6	–	0
Glendale (CA)	1	–	6	–	0	3	–	7	–	0
Compton	0	–	7	–	0	0	–	10	–	0
+ – Conference co-champions; ^ – California state junior college large division playoff participant

1973 Western State Conference football standings
	Conf.					Overall
Team	W		L		T	W		L		T
Ventura +	6	–	1	–	0	8	–	2	–	0
College of the Canyons +^	6	–	1	–	0	8	–	3	–	0
Santa Barbara City	5	–	1	–	1	7	–	2	–	1
Glendale (CA)	3	–	4	–	0	6	–	4	–	0
Hancock	3	–	4	–	0	4	–	6	–	0
Moorpark	2	–	4	–	1	4	–	5	–	1
West Los Angeles	2	–	5	–	0	4	–	5	–	0
Compton	0	–	7	–	0	1	–	9	–	0
+ – Conference co-champions; ^ – California state junior college large division playoff participant

1974 Western State Conference football standings
	Conf.					Overall
Team	W		L		T	W		L		T
West Los Angeles $^	6	–	1	–	0	7	–	4	–	0
Santa Barbara City	5	–	2	–	0	8	–	2	–	0
Moorpark	5	–	2	–	0	5	–	5	–	0
College of the Canyons	4	–	3	–	0	6	–	4	–	0
Ventura	4	–	3	–	0	5	–	5	–	0
Hancock	2	–	5	–	0	4	–	6	–	0
Compton	2	–	5	–	0	4	–	6	–	0
Glendale (CA)	0	–	7	–	0	1	–	9	–	0
$ – Conference champion; ^ – California state junior college Division II playoff participant

1975 Western State Conference football standings
	Conf.					Overall
Team	W		L		T	W		L		T
Santa Barbara City +	6	–	1	–	0	9	–	1	–	0
College of the Canyons +	6	–	1	–	0	6	–	4	–	1
Glendale (CA)	4	–	3	–	0	6	–	4	–	0
Ventura	3	–	4	–	0	6	–	4	–	0
Compton	3	–	4	–	0	4	–	6	–	0
Moorpark	3	–	4	–	0	3	–	6	–	1
West Los Angeles	2	–	5	–	0	4	–	6	–	0
Hancock	1	–	6	–	0	2	–	8	–	0
+ – Conference co-champions

1976 Western State Conference football standings
	Conf.					Overall
Team	W		L		T	W		L		T
Ventura +	6	–	1	–	0	9	–	1	–	0
Santa Barbara City +	6	–	1	–	0	7	–	4	–	0
Glendale (CA)	5	–	2	–	0	7	–	3	–	0
Moorpark	3	–	4	–	0	4	–	6	–	0
Compton	3	–	4	–	0	3	–	6	–	0
Hancock	2	–	5	–	0	3	–	7	–	0
West Los Angeles	2	–	5	–	0	2	–	7	–	1
College of the Canyons	1	–	6	–	0	2	–	7	–	0
+ – Conference co-champions

1977 Western State Conference football standings
	Conf.					Overall
Team	W		L		T	W		L		T
Glendale (CA) $	6	–	1	–	0	8	–	3	–	0
Ventura	5	–	2	–	0	8	–	2	–	0
College of the Canyons	5	–	2	–	0	6	–	4	–	0
Santa Barbara City	4	–	2	–	1	6	–	3	–	1
Moorpark	3	–	3	–	1	4	–	5	–	1
West Los Angeles	3	–	4	–	0	5	–	5	–	0
Hancock	1	–	6	–	0	2	–	8	–	0
Compton	0	–	7	–	0	1	–	9	–	0
$ – Conference champion

1978 Western State Conference football standings
	Conf.					Overall
Team	W		L		T	W		L		T
Glendale (CA) $	6	–	1	–	0	8	–	3	–	0
Hancock	5	–	2	–	0	8	–	2	–	0
Santa Barbara City	5	–	2	–	0	8	–	2	–	0
College of the Canyons	5	–	2	–	0	7	–	3	–	0
Ventura	3	–	4	–	0	3	–	7	–	0
Moorpark	2	–	5	–	0	4	–	6	–	0
West Los Angeles	2	–	5	–	0	3	–	5	–	1
Compton	0	–	7	–	0	3	–	7	–	0
$ – Conference champion

1979 Western State Conference football standings
	Conf.					Overall
Team	W		L		T	W		L		T
Santa Barbara City $	6	–	0	–	0	8	–	2	–	0
West Los Angeles	4	–	2	–	0	6	–	3	–	0
Glendale (CA)	4	–	3	–	0	5	–	5	–	0
Hancock	3	–	4	–	0	5	–	5	–	0
College of the Canyons	3	–	4	–	0	4	–	6	–	0
Ventura	3	–	4	–	0	4	–	6	–	0
Compton	2	–	5	–	0	3	–	6	–	1
Moorpark	2	–	5	–	0	3	–	7	–	0
$ – Conference champion

1980 Western State Conference football standings
	Conf.					Overall
Team	W		L		T	W		L		T
Ventura $	6	–	0	–	2	7	–	2	–	2
Compton	6	–	1	–	1	8	–	1	–	1
Santa Barbara City	5	–	2	–	1	6	–	3	–	1
Glendale (CA)	4	–	3	–	1	4	–	5	–	1
College of the Canyons	4	–	4	–	0	6	–	4	–	0
Hancock	2	–	5	–	1	4	–	5	–	1
West Los Angeles	2	–	6	–	0	4	–	6	–	0
Moorpark	2	–	6	–	0	3	–	7	–	0
Antelope Valley	2	–	6	–	0	2	–	8	–	0
$ – Conference champion

1981 Western State Conference football standings
	Conf.					Overall
Team	W		L		T	W		L		T
Taft $	6	–	0	–	0	9	–	1	–	0
Ventura	5	–	1	–	0	8	–	3	–	0
College of the Canyons	4	–	2	–	0	6	–	4	–	0
Glendale (CA)	3	–	3	–	0	6	–	4	–	0
Santa Barbara City	1	–	5	–	0	4	–	6	–	0
Hancock	1	–	5	–	0	3	–	7	–	0
Moorpark	1	–	5	–	0	2	–	6	–	0
$ – Conference champion

1982 Western State Conference football standings
	Conf.					Overall
Team	W		L		T	W		L		T
Glendale (CA) $	5	–	0	–	0	8	–	2	–	0
Santa Barbara City	4	–	1	–	0	8	–	2	–	0
Moorpark	3	–	2	–	0	5	–	4	–	0
Los Angeles Valley	1	–	4	–	0	3	–	7	–	0
Ventura	1	–	4	–	0	3	–	7	–	0
Hancock	1	–	4	–	0	2	–	8	–	0
$ – Conference champion

1983 Western State Conference football standings
	Conf.					Overall
Team	W		L		T	W		L		T
Glendale (CA) +	4	–	1	–	0	7	–	3	–	0
Santa Barbara City +	4	–	1	–	0	7	–	4	–	0
Ventura +	4	–	1	–	0	6	–	4	–	0
Hancock	2	–	3	–	0	3	–	7	–	0
Moorpark	1	–	4	–	0	2	–	8	–	0
Rio Hondo	0	–	5	–	0	3	–	7	–	0
+ – Conference co-champions

1984 Western State Conference football standings
	Conf.					Overall
Team	W		L		T	W		L		T
Ventura $	7	–	0	–	0	8	–	3	–	0
Santa Monica	6	–	1	–	0	7	–	2	–	1
Glendale (CA)	5	–	2	–	0	6	–	4	–	0
Moorpark	3	–	3	–	1	4	–	5	–	1
Santa Barbara City	3	–	4	–	0	3	–	7	–	0
Rio Hondo	2	–	4	–	1	3	–	6	–	1
Hancock	1	–	6	–	0	3	–	7	–	0
Compton	0	–	7	–	0	0	–	9	–	0
$ – Conference champion

1985 Western State Conference football standings
	Conf.					Overall
Team	W		L		T	W		L		T
Glendale (CA) +	6	–	1	–	0	10	–	1	–	0
Moorpark +	6	–	1	–	0	8	–	3	–	0
Ventura	4	–	3	–	0	6	–	4	–	0
Santa Monica	4	–	3	–	0	4	–	5	–	0
Compton	4	–	3	–	0	4	–	6	–	0
Santa Barbara City	2	–	5	–	0	2	–	7	–	0
Hancock	1	–	6	–	0	3	–	7	–	0
Rio Hondo	1	–	6	–	0	1	–	8	–	0
+ – Conference co-champions

1986 Western State Conference football standings
	Conf.					Overall
Team	W		L		T	W		L		T
Glendale (CA) $	6	–	0	–	0	10	–	1	–	0
Moorpark	5	–	1	–	0	6	–	3	–	0
Ventura	3	–	2	–	1	5	–	3	–	1
Bakersfield	3	–	3	–	0	4	–	6	–	0
Santa Monica	2	–	4	–	0	5	–	4	–	0
Hancock	1	–	5	–	0	3	–	6	–	0
Santa Barbara City	0	–	5	–	1	4	–	5	–	1
$ – Conference champion

1987 Western State Conference football standings
	Conf.					Overall
Team	W		L		T	W		L		T
Glendale (CA) +	5	–	1	–	0	6	–	4	–	0
Bakersfield +	5	–	1	–	0	6	–	5	–	0
Moorpark	4	–	2	–	0	7	–	2	–	0
Hancock	3	–	3	–	0	4	–	5	–	0
Santa Monica	3	–	3	–	0	4	–	5	–	0
Santa Barbara City	1	–	5	–	0	1	–	8	–	0
Ventura	0	–	6	–	0	0	–	9	–	0
+ – Conference co-champions

1988 Western State Conference football standings
	Conf.					Overall
Team	W		L		T	W		L		T
Northern Division
Glendale (CA) x	8	–	1	–	0	10	–	2	–	0
Moorpark x	8	–	1	–	0	9	–	2	–	0
Santa Barbara City	4	–	5	–	0	4	–	6	–	0
Ventura	4	–	5	–	0	5	–	5	–	0
Los Angeles Southwest	4	–	5	–	0	5	–	5	–	0
Harbor	1	–	8	–	0	1	–	10	–	0
Southern Division
Bakersfield x	9	–	0	–	0	11	–	0	–	0
Santa Monica	6	–	3	–	0	6	–	5	–	0
Los Angeles Valley	6	–	3	–	0	6	–	4	–	0
Compton	3	–	6	–	0	3	–	7	–	0
Pierce	1	–	8	–	0	1	–	9	–	0
West Los Angeles	0	–	9	–	0	0	–	10	–	0
x – Division champion/co-champions

1989 Western State Conference football standings
	Div					Conf.					Overall
Team	W		L		T	W		L		T	W		L		T
Northern Division
Moorpark x	5	–	0	–	0	8	–	1	–	0	9	–	2	–	0
Los Angeles Southwest	4	–	1	–	0	6	–	2	–	1	7	–	3	–	1
Ventura	2	–	3	–	0	6	–	3	–	0	7	–	4	–	0
Glendale (CA)	2	–	3	–	0	5	–	3	–	1	5	–	4	–	1
Santa Barbara City	1	–	4	–	0	5	–	4	–	0	6	–	4	–	0
Harbor	0	–	5	–	0	2	–	7	–	0	3	–	7	–	0
Southern Division
Bakersfield x	5	–	0	–	0	7	–	0	–	2	8	–	1	–	2
Los Angeles Valley	4	–	1	–	0	5	–	4	–	0	5	–	6	–	0
Pierce	3	–	2	–	0	3	–	6	–	0	4	–	6	–	0
Santa Monica	2	–	3	–	0	4	–	5	–	0	5	–	5	–	0
Compton	1	–	4	–	0	1	–	8	–	0	1	–	9	–	0
West Los Angeles	0	–	5	–	0	0	–	9	–	0	0	–	10	–	0
x – Division champion/co-champions

1990 Western State Conference football standings
	Div					Conf.					Overall
Team	W		L		T	W		L		T	W		L		T
Northern Division
Glendale (CA) x	5	–	0	–	0	8	–	1	–	0	9	–	2	–	0
Moorpark	4	–	1	–	0	7	–	2	–	0	9	–	2	–	0
Ventura	3	–	2	–	0	3	–	6	–	0	3	–	7	–	0
Harbor	2	–	3	–	0	4	–	5	–	0	5	–	5	–	0
Santa Barbara City	1	–	4	–	0	3	–	6	–	0	4	–	6	–	0
Compton	0	–	5	–	0	0	–	9	–	0	0	–	10	–	0
Southern Division
Bakersfield x	5	–	0	–	0	9	–	0	–	0	10	–	1	–	0
Santa Monica	4	–	1	–	0	7	–	2	–	0	8	–	3	–	0
Los Angeles Southwest	2	–	3	–	0	4	–	5	–	0	4	–	6	–	0
Pierce	2	–	3	–	0	4	–	5	–	0	4	–	6	–	0
West Los Angeles	1	–	4	–	0	3	–	6	–	0	4	–	6	–	0
Los Angeles Valley	1	–	4	–	0	3	–	6	–	0	3	–	7	–	0
x – Division champion/co-champions

1991 Western State Conference football standings
	Div					Conf.					Overall
Team	W		L		T	W		L		T	W		L		T
Northern Division
Santa Barbara City x	5	–	0	–	0	8	–	1	–	0	9	–	2	–	0
Moorpark	4	–	1	–	0	7	–	2	–	0	9	–	2	–	0
Glendale (CA)	3	–	2	–	0	3	–	6	–	0	3	–	7	–	0
Ventura	2	–	3	–	0	3	–	6	–	0	3	–	7	–	0
Harbor	1	–	4	–	0	2	–	7	–	0	2	–	8	–	0
Compton	0	–	5	–	0	0	–	9	–	0	0	–	10	–	0
Southern Division
Santa Monica x	4	–	1	–	0	7	–	2	–	0	8	–	3	–	0
Los Angeles Southwest	3	–	1	–	1	7	–	1	–	1	8	–	2	–	1
Pierce	3	–	1	–	1	6	–	2	–	1	7	–	3	–	1
Bakersfield	3	–	2	–	0	5	–	4	–	0	5	–	5	–	0
Los Angeles Valley	1	–	4	–	0	4	–	5	–	0	4	–	6	–	0
West Los Angeles	0	–	5	–	0	1	–	8	–	0	2	–	8	–	0
x – Division champion/co-champions

1992 Western State Conference football standings
	Div					Conf.					Overall
Team	W		L		T	W		L		T	W		L		T
Northern Division
Moorpark x	5	–	0	–	0	8	–	0	–	1	9	–	1	–	1
Glendale (CA)	4	–	1	–	0	7	–	2	–	0	8	–	3	–	0
Harbor	2	–	3	–	0	6	–	3	–	0	7	–	3	–	0
Santa Barbara City	2	–	3	–	0	4	–	5	–	0	5	–	5	–	0
Ventura	1	–	4	–	0	2	–	7	–	0	2	–	8	–	0
Compton	0	–	5	–	0	0	–	9	–	0	0	–	10	–	0
Southern Division
Bakersfield x	5	–	0	–	0	7	–	1	–	1	9	–	1	–	1
Santa Monica	4	–	1	–	0	5	–	4	–	0	5	–	5	–	0
Los Angeles Valley	2	–	3	–	0	5	–	4	–	0	5	–	4	–	1
Pierce	2	–	3	–	0	4	–	5	–	0	5	–	5	–	0
West Los Angeles	1	–	4	–	0	3	–	6	–	0	3	–	7	–	0
Los Angeles Southwest	1	–	4	–	0	2	–	7	–	0	2	–	7	–	1
x – Division champion/co-champions

1993 Western State Conference football standings
	Div					Conf.					Overall
Team	W		L		T	W		L		T	W		L		T
Northern Division
Moorpark x	5	–	0	–	0	8	–	1	–	0	8	–	3	–	0
Glendale (CA)	4	–	1	–	0	4	–	4	–	1	5	–	4	–	1
Santa Barbara City	3	–	2	–	0	5	–	4	–	0	5	–	5	–	0
Harbor	2	–	3	–	0	3	–	6	–	0	4	–	6	–	0
Compton	1	–	4	–	0	2	–	7	–	0	2	–	8	–	0
Ventura	0	–	5	–	0	0	–	9	–	0	0	–	10	–	0
Southern Division
Bakersfield x	5	–	0	–	0	9	–	0	–	0	10	–	1	–	0
Los Angeles Valley	3	–	2	–	0	7	–	2	–	0	9	–	2	–	0
Pierce	2	–	3	–	0	5	–	4	–	0	5	–	5	–	0
Los Angeles Southwest	2	–	3	–	0	3	–	5	–	1	3	–	6	–	1
Santa Monica	1	–	3	–	1	3	–	5	–	1	3	–	6	–	1
West Los Angeles	1	–	3	–	1	3	–	5	–	1	3	–	6	–	1
x – Division champion/co-champions

1994 Western State Conference football standings
	Div					Conf.					Overall
Team	W		L		T	W		L		T	W		L		T
Northern Division
Moorpark x	5	–	0	–	0	8	–	1	–	0	8	–	3	–	0
Hancock	4	–	1	–	0	6	–	3	–	0	7	–	4	–	0
Santa Barbara City	3	–	2	–	0	5	–	4	–	0	5	–	5	–	0
Glendale (CA)	2	–	3	–	0	4	–	5	–	0	5	–	5	–	0
Pierce	1	–	4	–	0	2	–	7	–	0	2	–	8	–	0
Ventura	0	–	5	–	0	3	–	5	–	0	4	–	6	–	0
Southern Division
Bakersfield x	6	–	0	–	0	8	–	1	–	0	10	–	1	–	0
Los Angeles Valley	5	–	1	–	0	9	–	1	–	0	10	–	1	–	0
Los Angeles Southwest	2	–	3	–	1	3	–	5	–	1	4	–	5	–	1
Santa Monica	2	–	4	–	0	4	–	5	–	0	5	–	5	–	0
Harbor	2	–	4	–	0	2	–	7	–	0	2	–	8	–	0
West Los Angeles	2	–	4	–	0	2	–	8	–	0	2	–	8	–	0
Compton	1	–	4	–	1	2	–	6	–	1	3	–	6	–	1
x – Division champion/co-champions

1995 Western State Conference football standings
	Conf.					Overall
Team	W		L		T	W		L		T
Northern Division
Bakersfield x	5	–	0	–	0	10	–	1	–	0
Hancock	4	–	1	–	0	9	–	2	–	0
Santa Barbara City	3	–	2	–	0	5	–	4	–	1
Glendale (CA)	2	–	3	–	0	3	–	7	–	0
Ventura	1	–	4	–	0	2	–	8	–	0
Pierce	0	–	5	–	0	1	–	9	–	0
Southern Division
Los Angeles Valley x	6	–	0	–	0	10	–	1	–	0
Santa Monica	5	–	1	–	0	7	–	3	–	1
Moorpark	4	–	2	–	0	8	–	3	–	0
Harbor	3	–	3	–	0	5	–	5	–	0
Los Angeles Southwest	2	–	4	–	0	3	–	7	–	0
West Los Angeles	1	–	6	–	0	3	–	7	–	0
Compton	0	–	6	–	0	1	–	9	–	0
x – Division champion/co-champions

1996 Western State Conference football standings
	Div					Conf.					Overall
Team	W		L		T	W		L		T	W		L		T
Northern Division
Bakersfield x	5	–	0	–	0	7	–	1	–	0	10	–	1	–	0
Hancock	4	–	1	–	0	8	–	1	–	0	9	–	2	–	0
Santa Barbara City	3	–	2	–	0	7	–	3	–	0	7	–	4	–	0
Glendale (CA)	2	–	3	–	0	3	–	6	–	0	4	–	6	–	0
Ventura	1	–	4	–	0	4	–	6	–	0	4	–	6	–	0
Pierce	0	–	5	–	0	0	–	9	–	0	0	–	10	–	0
Southern Division
Los Angeles Valley x	6	–	0	–	0	9	–	1	–	0	10	–	1	–	0
Moorpark	5	–	1	–	0	8	–	2	–	0	8	–	3	–	0
West Los Angeles	4	–	2	–	0	7	–	3	–	0	7	–	4	–	0
Santa Monica	3	–	3	–	0	4	–	6	–	0	4	–	6	–	0
Los Angeles Southwest	2	–	4	–	0	3	–	5	–	0	3	–	7	–	0
Compton	1	–	5	–	0	1	–	8	–	0	1	–	9	–	0
Harbor	0	–	6	–	0	0	–	10	–	0	0	–	10	–	0
x – Division champion/co-champions

1997 Western State Conference football standings
	Conf.					Overall
Team	W		L		T	W		L		T
Northern Division
Hancock x	5	–	0	–	0	8	–	3	–	0
Bakersfield	4	–	1	–	0	9	–	2	–	0
Santa Barbara City	3	–	2	–	0	6	–	4	–	0
Glendale (CA)	2	–	3	–	0	2	–	8	–	0
Ventura	1	–	4	–	0	1	–	9	–	0
Pierce	0	–	5	–	0	0	–	10	–	0
Southern Division
West Los Angeles x	4	–	1	–	0	8	–	3	–	0
Los Angeles Southwest x	4	–	1	–	0	7	–	4	–	0
Moorpark x	4	–	1	–	0	6	–	4	–	0
Los Angeles Valley	2	–	3	–	0	6	–	4	–	0
Santa Monica	1	–	4	–	0	4	–	6	–	0
Harbor	0	–	5	–	0	4	–	6	–	0
x – Division champion/co-champions

1998 Western State Conference football standings
	Conf.					Overall
Team	W		L		T	W		L		T
Northern Division
Bakersfield x	6	–	0	–	0	8	–	3	–	0
Ventura	4	–	2	–	0	9	–	2	–	0
Hancock	4	–	2	–	0	8	–	3	–	0
College of the Canyons	4	–	2	–	0	7	–	4	–	0
Glendale (CA)	2	–	4	–	0	3	–	7	–	0
Santa Barbara City	1	–	5	–	0	1	–	9	–	0
Pierce	0	–	5	–	0	1	–	9	–	0
Southern Division
Moorpark x	7	–	0	–	0	9	–	2	–	0
West Los Angeles	6	–	1	–	0	7	–	4	–	0
Santa Monica	5	–	2	–	0	7	–	4	–	0
Los Angeles Southwest	4	–	3	–	0	6	–	4	–	0
Los Angeles Valley	3	–	4	–	0	4	–	6	–	0
East Los Angeles	2	–	5	–	0	3	–	7	–	0
Harbor	1	–	6	–	0	2	–	8	–	0
Compton	0	–	7	–	0	0	–	10	–	0
x – Division champion/co-champions

1999 Western State Conference football standings
	Conf.			Overall
Team	W		L	W		L
Northern Division
Allan Hancock x	6	–	1	9	–	1
Ventura x	6	–	1	9	–	1
Moorpark	5	–	2	6	–	4
College of the Canyons	4	–	3	7	–	3
Los Angeles Valley	3	–	4	5	–	5
Glendale (CA)	2	–	5	4	–	6
Santa Barbara City	2	–	5	3	–	7
Pierce	0	–	7	1	–	9
Southern Division
Bakersfield x	7	–	0	9	–	1
Los Angeles Southwest	5	–	2	6	–	4
West Los Angeles	4	–	3	6	–	4
Santa Monica	4	–	3	5	–	5
Citrus	3	–	4	4	–	6
East Los Angeles	2	–	5	3	–	7
Los Angeles Harbor	2	–	5	2	–	8
Compton	1	–	6	3	–	7
x – Division champion/co-champions

2000 Western State Conference football standings
	Conf.			Overall
Team	W		L	W		L
Northern Division
College of the Canyons x	6	–	1	9	–	2
Allan Hancock x	6	–	1	9	–	2
Moorpark	5	–	2	6	–	4
Ventura	4	–	3	5	–	5
Pierce	3	–	4	3	–	7
Glendale (CA)	2	–	5	3	–	7
Los Angeles Valley	2	–	5	2	–	8
Santa Barbara City	0	–	7	0	–	10
Southern Division
Bakersfield x	6	–	1	10	–	2
Santa Monica	5	–	2	8	–	3
Citrus	5	–	2	6	–	5
East Los Angeles	4	–	3	7	–	4
Los Angeles Southwest	3	–	4	6	–	4
Compton	2	–	5	5	–	5
West Los Angeles	2	–	5	3	–	7
Los Angeles Harbor	1	–	6	3	–	7
x – Division champion/co-champions

2001 Western State Conference football standings
	Conf.			Overall
Team	W		L	W		L
Mountain Division
Bakersfield x	6	–	1	8	–	2
Glendale (CA)	5	–	2	6	–	4
Ventura	5	–	2	5	–	5
Citrus	4	–	3	5	–	5
Moorpark	3	–	4	4	–	6
Los Angeles Valley	3	–	4	3	–	7
Santa Barbara City	1	–	6	2	–	8
East Los Angeles	1	–	6	2	–	8
Pacific Division
College of the Canyons x	7	–	0	9	–	1
Allan Hancock	6	–	1	7	–	3
Compton	5	–	2	6	–	4
Los Angeles Harbor	3	–	4	5	–	5
West Los Angeles	3	–	4	4	–	6
Los Angeles Southwest	3	–	4	3	–	7
Santa Monica	1	–	6	1	–	9
Pierce	0	–	7	0	–	10
x – Division champion/co-champions
