= Allan Hancock College =

Community college in Santa Maria, California, US

Coordinates: 34°56′30″N 120°25′08″W

- Former name: Santa Maria Junior College
- Type: Public community college
- Established: 1920
- Parent institution: California Community Colleges System
- President: Kevin G. Walthers
- Students: 13,741 (Spring 2013)
- Location: Santa Maria, California, United States
- Campus: 105 acres (42 ha)
- Colors: Blue and gold
- Nickname: Bulldogs
- Sporting affiliations: CCCAA – WSC, SCFA (football)
- Mascot: Spike the Bulldog
- Website: hancockcollege.edu

Allan Hancock College is a public community college in Santa Maria, California. It offers associate degrees at its Lompoc Valley campus and at nearby Vandenberg Space Force Base. The college is part of the California Community College System.

== History ==
In 1920 Allan Hancock College was started by the Santa Maria High School District. Originally called Santa Maria Junior College, classes were held until eventually a bond was passed that allowed them to build a wing specifically for the college. Due to rising enrollment numbers in 1954, the college was moved to the former site of Allan Hancock Field. Named after G. Allan Hancock, Santa Maria's Hancock College of Aeronautics was the primary training center for fighter pilots during World War II. Soon after it was moved the name was changed to Allan Hancock College in honor of George Allan Hancock. In 1958 another bond was passed that allowed the college to buy the site they were on, and start a building program.

A large business education building was opened in 1964, and a new fine arts building in 1965. The industrial technology building, gymnasium, administration and student services were all completed in 1967, and the performing arts center in 1968. A remodel of the Learning Resource Center, one of the original campus buildings, was finished in 2007. A community education building was opened in 2007, which currently contains modern computers and offices, along with a new two-story science building. In June 2006 a $180-million bond measure was passed, allowing additional new facilities to be completed over a period of 10 years.

== Lompoc Valley Center ==
The Lompoc Valley Center (LVC) is located at the north end of the city of Lompoc at the intersection of Cabrillo Highway and "H" Street. The center opened in 1999, and has three main buildings plus a utility structure totaling 58,388 square feet (5,424.4 m^{2}). All of the buildings are designed to be multifunctional as needs expand and change. The LVC is situated on 23 acres (9.3 ha) of a 156-acre (63 ha) parcel that includes portions of Davis Creek. All three main buildings are multifunctional. Building 1 is mostly for administrative purposes. Across from Building 1 is the Library. Upstairs from the Administration office is the Cafe, where students can play games, watch a movie, get food. Vending Machines are also available outside of the Cafe. Building 2 will have mainly General Education classes, but also includes, CNA, Student Job Placement/Career Services, Computer Labs, and the University Transfer Center. Building 3 across from the patio area and will consists of mostly Arts, Science Labs, Physical Education, and some General Education classes. Building 4 is on the side of Building 1 and its main purpose is for utilities. No unauthorized personnel can access the utilities building. Scheduled to open in 2013, the Public Safety Training Complex is one of Allan Hancock College's most anticipated Measure I-funded projects and promises to change the future of public safety training in the region and across the state. The $37.9 million facility will house the college's police, fire, emergency medical services, and environmental technology programs. The state-of-the-art complex will include a six-story fire tower, one-mile Emergency Vehicle Operations course, a ‘scenario’ village, shooting range, fitness track, obstacle course and much more.

Some buildings on the north side of the Santa Maria campus date from the original airfield.

== Organization and administration ==
The college is part of the California Community Colleges System. The college president is Kevin G. Walthers.

== Academics ==
There are forty-eight major categories of programs offered by the college, ranging from accounting to wildland fire technology. Many of these categories are also divided into sub-categories, each of which offers its own degree or certificate.

=== University Transfer Center ===
The University Transfer Center is responsible for providing students four-year university and college information, including admission requirements and major and department information for the California State University, University of California, and California Independent Colleges and University systems.

The University Transfer Center maintains a reference library of university catalogs including out-of-state and study abroad programs. Academic counseling is available to assist transfer students in researching majors, campus selection, transcript evaluations, certification of general education patterns, scheduling of campus visits, and meeting with four-year university representatives.

The University Transfer Center is responsible for providing students four-year university and college information, including admission requirements and major and department information for the California State University, University of California, and California Independent Colleges and University systems. Allan Hancock College provides all the lower-division courses, while the universities provide all the upper-division courses required to complete a bachelor's degree.

The college has several partnerships with Cal Poly, San Luis Obispo, through its STEM programs science, technology, engineering and mathematics, that provide internships and a direct path to transfer.

=== Vandenberg Air Force Base Center ===
The Allan Hancock College Vandenberg Air Force Base Center (formerly known as Camp Cook) opened in 1952 and is part of the base education center shared with the U.S. Air Force Education Office and three private four-year universities. Vandenberg Air Force Base Center offers academic courses and provides different support services such as registration (including adds/drops and processing on-demand transcripts); counseling, health services, issues financial aid including BOG and assists with GI Bill guidelines. Active duty military personnel receive in state rates and may qualify for 100 percent tuition assistance and health fee coverage. Active duty student and Veterans (with two year of separation) may be eligible for priority registration.

The center offers mainly general education classes through traditional semester and eight week Fast Track classes. AHC VAFB offers classes to help airman achieve their associate degree including the Community College of the Air Force degree. With education becoming more critical in the work place today, AHC partnered with Vandenberg recognizes and accommodates for such a need and can assist in providing opportunities for military members, spouses, base contractors and the local community to pursue higher education. Credits can be earned and applied to a Fire Science degree awarded by the college The Vandenberg Interagency Training Facility is located on South Vandenberg Air Force Base.

== Student life ==
Student demographics as of Fall 2023
Race and ethnicity	Total
Hispanic	72%
White	18%
Multiracial	3%
African American	2%
Filipino	2%
Unknown	2%
Asian	1%

Events include:

The Bulldog Bow-WOW! event occurs in the beginning of the spring and fall semesters. This particular event introduces the college's student services, academic programs, and student organizations to new and current students.

Transfer Day is an event for students interested in transferring to universities. This also ties with free field trips to nearby colleges such as University of California, Santa Barbara; California Polytechnic State University; and California State University, Monterey Bay that Allan Hancock provides for students.

Art exhibitions are frequent, usually held in the Ann Foxworthy Gallery.

There are a wide variety of dances performed, such as Dimensions in Dance, held every fall semester in the Marian Theatre on the Santa Maria campus. There are usually 10–12 original dances performed and choreographed by faculty and students.

There is also a wide variety of student organizations on campus ranging from student government, cultural clubs, and identity based clubs. In specific the Gender, Sexuality, and Acceptance Club was formed in the early 2000's and took a brief hiatus before reigniting in 2018 to present day. The club served as one of the only spaces on campus serving LGTBQ+ students of color in Santa Maria.

== Athletics ==
AHC athletic teams are known as the Bulldogs. The athletic program at Allan Hancock College contains fourteen men's and women's varsity teams. The college competes as a member of the California Community College Athletic Association (CCCAA) in the Western State Conference (WSC) for all sports except football, which competes in Southern California Football Association (SCFA). Men's sports are baseball, basketball, cross country, football, golf, swimming and diving, soccer, and track and field; women's sports are basketball, cross country, soccer, softball, swimming and diving, track and field, and volleyball. The sports facilities on the Allan Hancock college campus include a physical fitness lab, swimming pool, soccer field, baseball field, track and tennis courts and softball field.

=== Football ===
==== State championship appearances ====
In 1999, AHC advanced to the CCCAA Championship Game, ultimately falling to eventual nationally crowned City College of San Francisco, 22-14 at Ratcliffe Stadium.

==== Bowl game victories ====
Allan Hancock owns seven bowl game wins all-time:

- 1960 Orange Show Bowl
- 1995 Producers Daily Bowl
- 1999 Western State Bowl
- 2000 Western State Bowl
- 2011 Western State Bowl
- 2018 American Bowl
- 2019 Western State Bowl

==== NCAA Division I transfers ====
As of 2020, more than 64 former Bulldogs since the 2004 season had continued their football careers playing at various NCAA Division I-level programs. Following a resumption of full competition after a COVID-19 hiatus, AHC's Max Stineman added to the list in December 2021, signing a National Letter of Intent with Eastern Illinois.

== Notable people ==
- Cameron Artis-Payne, Carolina Panthers running back
- Brian Asselstine, Retired major league baseball player, Atlanta Braves.
- Kathy Bates, a motion picture star who won an Academy Award for her portrayal in the motion picture Misery, also won an Obie Award for her performance in the original off-Broadway production of Frankie and Johnny in the Clair de Lune. A PCPA alumnus, she also has received a Los Angeles Drama Critics Award for Best Actress in a Mark Taper Forum production.
- Mike Bratz, former NBA player with the Phoenix Suns, Cleveland Cavaliers, Golden State Warriors and Sacramento Kings.
- Sheldon Canley, former running back in the NFL, played for the San Francisco 49ers and New York Jets.
- Jeffrey Combs, actor, stage, screen and television (Star Trek: Deep Space Nine).
- Gunther Cunningham, assistant head coach-linebackers for the NFL's Tennessee Titans; former head coach of the NFL's Kansas City Chiefs.
- Ted Davidson, former MLB pitcher with the Cincinnati Reds and Atlanta Braves.
- Carlos Diaz, former MLB player with the Atlanta Braves, New York Mets and Los Angeles Dodgers
- Zac Efron, actor and singer.
- Boyd Gaines, 3-time Tony award-winning actor, stage, screen and television (The Heidi Chronicles, Cabaret, Contact, Heartbreak Ridge, Evergreen).
- Johnnie Gray, retired American safety in the National Football League.
- Harry Groener, 3-time Tony-nominated stage actor (Oklahoma, Cats, Crazy for You).
- Harry Hamlin, actor, stage, screen and television (L.A. Law, Clash of the Titans).
- Mark Harelik, playwright (The Immigrant) and actor, stage, screen and television (Prison Break, Wings, The Hollow Lands, The Heidi Chronicles).
- Winifred Hervey, Emmy and Golden Globe award-winning television producer and writer (The Steve Harvey Show, Golden Girls, The Fresh Prince of Bel-Air); selected as an AACC Alumni of the Year (2001).
- Tim Kring, television executive producer and writer (Heroes, Providence, Chicago Hope, Crossing Jordan).
- John Madden, Pro Football Hall of Famer and Super Bowl-winning coach. After he suffered a knee injury while training for the Philadelphia Eagles, Madden went back to college at Cal Poly to receive his master's degree in education, later becoming an assistant coach at Allan Hancock College. In 1962, Madden was promoted to head coach at Hancock, where he spent two years. During his coaching at Hancock, he led them to a record of 12–6.
- John Marshall, assistant coach-defensive line, NFL's Detroit Lions; former assistant head coach/defensive coordinator, NFL's Carolina Panthers.
- Jeff McCarthy, Broadway and movie actor whose roles have included the "Beast" in Disney's Beauty and the Beast.
- Kelly McGillis, award-winning film and stage actress (Top Gun, Witness, A Seagull, Twelfth Night).
- Chuck Negron, American singer-songwriter, best known as one of the three lead vocalists in the band Three Dog Night, which he helped to form in 1968.
- Leslie Parsons, Emmy-nominated production designer and art director (Murder, She Wrote; Falcon Crest; Star Trek: Voyager).
- George Perry, Alzheimer's disease researcher and dean at the University of Texas at San Antonio.
- John Rudometkin, star college basketball player at USC and then professionally for the New York Knicks and San Francisco Warriors
- Owen W. Siler (deceased), former Commandant of the U.S. Coast Guard; member of Joint Chiefs of Staff under Presidents Nixon, Ford and Carter; received California Community College Distinguished Alumni Award for 2002 from the California Community College League; Siler died July 17, 2007, at the age of 85.
- Bryn Smith, retired major league pitcher for the Colorado Rockies, Montreal Expos, and St. Louis Cardinals.
