= West Los Angeles College =

Community college in Culver City, California, US

- Motto: Go West, Go Far!
- Type: Public community college
- Established: February 1969
- President: Matthew Jordan
- Students: 9,859 (2012)
- Location: Los Angeles County, California, U.S. 34°00′14.81″N 118°23′11.76″W
- Campus: Urban
- Colors: Blue and gold
- Nickname: Wildcats
- Sporting affiliations: CCCAA – WSC, SCFA (football)
- Website: www.wlac.edu

West Los Angeles College (West L.A. College or WLAC) is a public community college in Culver City, Los Angeles County, California. It is part of the California Community Colleges System and the Los Angeles Community College District. It is accredited by the Accrediting Commission for Community and Junior Colleges. The school offers associate degrees including 18 vocational-oriented programs in addition to 25 transfer programs. The college awards more than 600 degrees and certificates annually in 39 fields.

Beginning in the fall of 2016, WLAC became one of only 15 community colleges in the State of California approved to offer a bachelor's degree. The college is now authorized to teach two bachelor's degree programs, dental hygiene and avionics.

Demographics of student body
Ethnic breakdown	2018	2017
Hispanic and Latino American	47%	45%
African American	20%	23%
Asian American	4%	5%
Native Hawaiian or other Pacific Islander	0%	0%
White	10%	11%
Multiracial Americans	3%	3%
International students	2%	3%
Unknown	13%	9%
Female	60%	58%
Male	40%	42%

== Athletics ==
The college's athletic teams are nicknamed the Wildcats. The teams were previously known as the Oilers. The Wildcats nickname was adopted in 2008. The college currently sponsors 12 varsity sports, five men's, six women's, and one co-ed. West Los Angeles competes as a member of the California Community College Athletic Association (CCCAA) in the Western State Conference (WSC) for all sports except football, which competes in Southern California Football Association (SCFA).

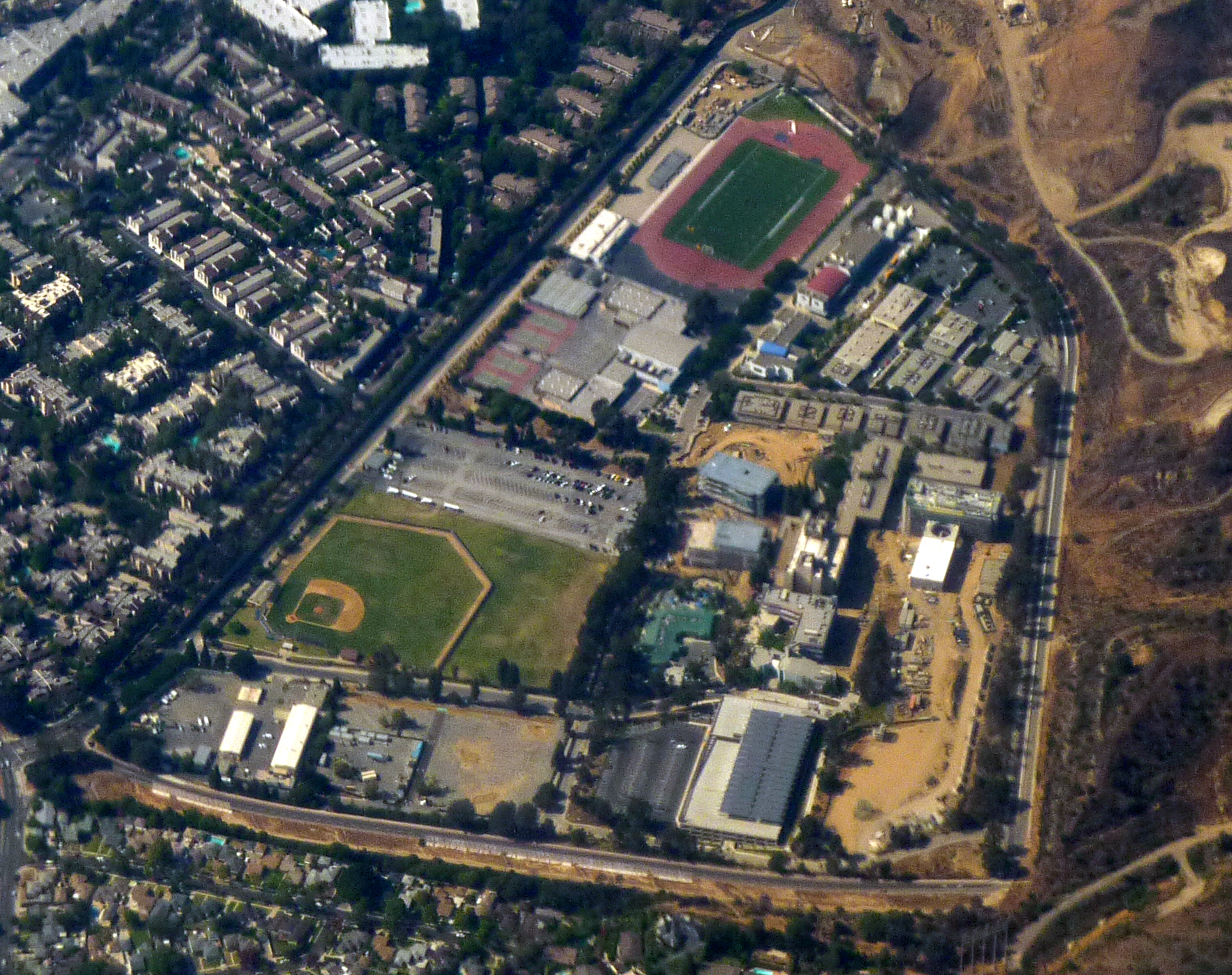
Aerial view of the campus.

Men's:

- Baseball
- Basketball
- Cheer (co-ed)
- Cross country
- Football
- Track and field

Women's:

- Basketball
- Cheer (co-ed)
- Cross country
- Soccer
- Softball
- Track and field
- Volleyball

The college athletic fields hosted track and field events at the 1984 Summer Olympics.

== Notable alumni ==
Student body composition as of 2022
Race and ethnicity	Total
Hispanic	48%
Black	20%
White	15%
Unknown	5%
Asian	6%
Two or more races (Note: Other consists of Multiracial Americans & those who prefer to not say.)	4%
Foreign national	1%
Gender Distribution
Male	38%
Female	62%
Age Distribution
Under 18	10%
18–24	42%
25–64	47%
Over 65	1%

- Jhené Aiko (born 1988), singer and songwriter
- LaVar Ball, former basketball player (and football player), now businessman
- Isaac Bruce, professional football player
- Tre Capital (born 1995), rapper and songwriter
- Rashied Davis, professional football player
- Keyshawn Johnson, professional football player
- Warren Moon, professional football player
- Schoolboy Q (born 1986), rapper, also played on the football team
- Ryan Sherriff (born 1990), Major League Baseball pitcher
- Louie Walker, professional football player
