= Carl Fennema =

American football player (1926–2022)

Profile
- Position: Center/linebacker

Personal information
- Born: October 17, 1926; San Francisco, California
- Died: September 2022 (aged 95)
- Listed height: 6 ft 2 in (1.88 m)
- Listed weight: 210 lb (95 kg)

Career information
- High school: Woodrow Wilson Classical (Long Beach, California)
- College: Compton, Washington

Career history
- New York Giants (1948–1949)
- Stats at Pro Football Reference

Carl Henry Fennema (October 17, 1926 – September 2022) was an American football center who played for the New York Giants. He played college football at the University of Washington, having previously attended Woodrow Wilson High School in Long Beach, California. He is a member of the Long Beach Century Club Hall of Fame. Fennema died in September 2022 at the age of 95.
