= Los Angeles Valley College =

Public community college in Los Angeles, California

- Type: Public community college
- Established: 1949
- Parent institution: Los Angeles Community College District
- President: Barry Gribbons
- Students: 18,308
- Location: Valley Glen, Los Angeles, California, U.S. 34.17577°N 118.421097°W
- Campus: Urban, 105 acres (42 ha)
- Colors: Green and gold
- Nickname: Monarchs
- Sporting affiliations: CCCAA – WSC, SCFA (football)
- Website: www.lavc.edu

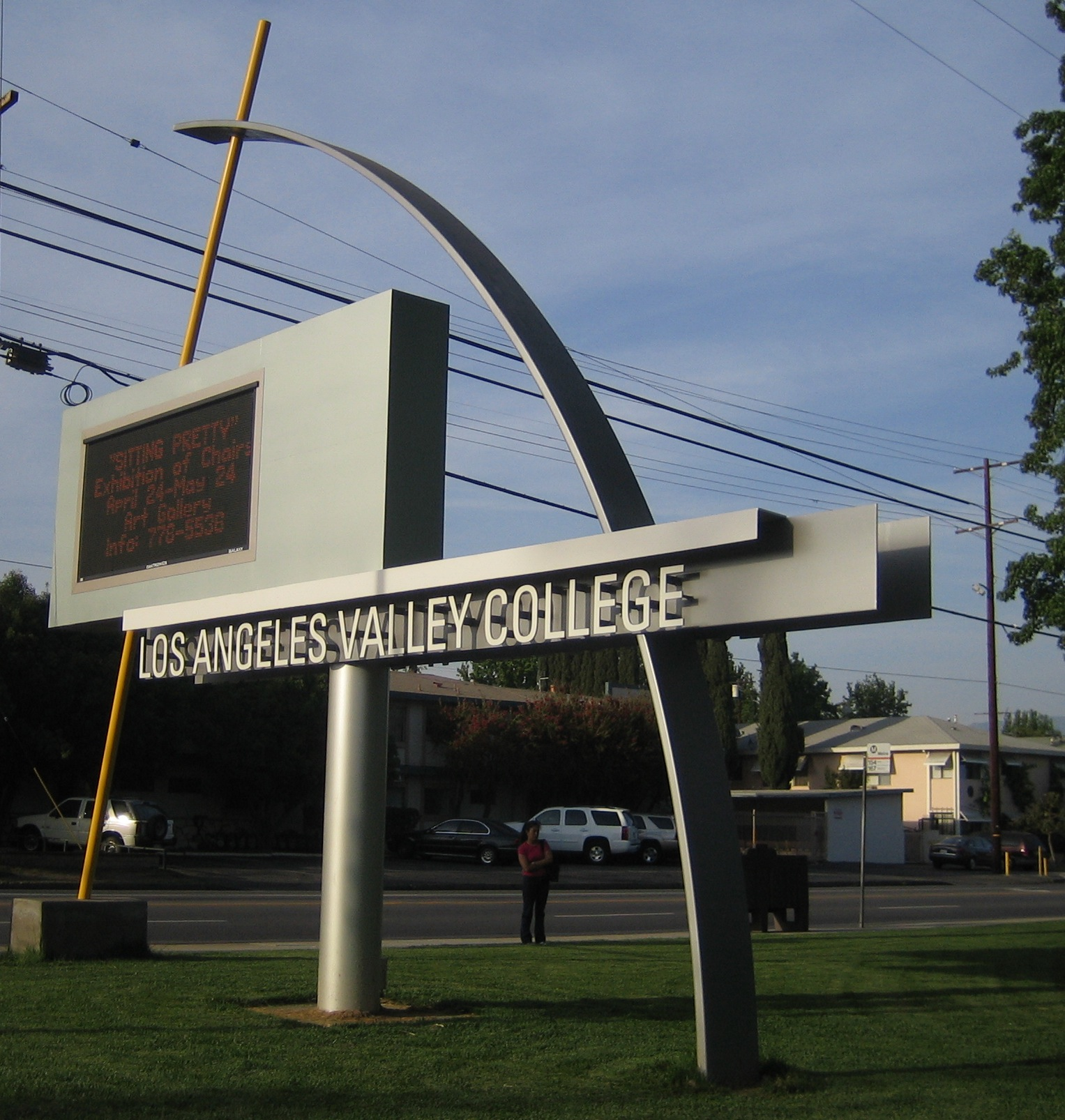
The college's sign and marquee at the corner of Fulton Ave & Oxnard St

Los Angeles Valley College (LAVC, Valley College, or Valley) is a public community college in Los Angeles, California, United States. It is part of the Los Angeles Community College District, and serves Valley Glen and its surrounding neighborhoods in the San Fernando Valley.

The college is adjacent to Grant High School in the neighborhood of Valley Glen. Often called "Valley College" or simply "Valley" by those who frequent the campus, it opened its doors to the public on September 12, 1949, at which time the campus was located on the site of Van Nuys High School. The college moved to its current location in 1951, a 105-acre (42 ha) site bounded by Fulton Avenue on the west, Ethel Avenue/Coldwater Canyon Boulevard on the east, Burbank Boulevard on the south, and Oxnard Street on the north.

Los Angeles Valley College is one of nine colleges in the Los Angeles Community College District (LACCD) and is accredited by the Accrediting Commission for Community and Junior Colleges.

The sports teams are the Monarchs and the school colors are green and yellow.

== History ==
Los Angeles Valley College was founded on September 12, 1949, to meet the tremendous growth of the San Fernando Valley during the 1940s and early 1950s. The college was officially chartered by the Los Angeles Board of Education in June 1949 and was located on the campus of Van Nuys High School. In 1951, Valley College moved to its permanent 105-acre (42 ha) site on Fulton Avenue in Valley Glen.

In 1954, members of the faculty founded the Athenaeum which began to offer community programs that brought the Los Angeles Philharmonic to the campus. The campus also had internationally known speakers including Eustace St. James, Eleanor Roosevelt, Clement Attlee, Margaret Mead, and Louis Leakey.

In 1969, the Los Angeles Community College District was formed and its nine colleges were separated from the Los Angeles Unified School District.

In December 2016, many of the college's electronic files were maliciously encrypted, disrupting voicemail, email, and computer files. A ransom note demanded $28,000 in Bitcoin in exchange for a decryption key. The Los Angeles Community College District paid the amount.

In 2016, the Los Angeles Community College District approved the construction of the Valley Academic and Cultural Center building to meet campus needs. The project was originally scheduled to be completed and opened in 2018 but the completion date has been pushed back twice, first to 2020 and then to 2022. Although the project was originally approved with a $78.5 million budget, the cost has increased to over $100 million.

=== Campus security incidents ===
Student body composition as of 2022
Race and ethnicity	Total
Hispanic	51%
White	29%
Asian	7%
Black	5%
Unknown	4%
Two or more races (Note: Other consists of Multiracial Americans and those who prefer to not say)	3%
Foreign national	0%
Gender Distribution
Male	40%
Female	60%
Age Distribution
Under 18	11%
18–24	47%
25–64	41%
Over 65	1%

In January 2014, a man was fatally shot in the parking lot of Los Angeles Valley College due to a drug deal gone bad. Two men were later arrested in connection with the shooting.

In 2014 and 2016, Los Angeles Valley College was locked down and evacuated several times due to reports of active shooters. In February 2014, a former student was detained in a "swatting" incident where another person called in a fake threat that the student was planning to shoot the school. The student was released after several hours when it was determined to be a hoax. In June 2014, Los Angeles Valley College received a threatening phone call from a man claiming he was coming to the school with guns. The campus was on lockdown; however, the threat failed to materialize, and the Los Angeles County Sheriff's Department opened an investigation. On March 30, 2016, Los Angeles Valley College was evacuated due to a suspicious package on campus and a bomb threat. On November 10, 2016, the campus was again locked down due to shots being reported on campus. It was later claimed that the reports were an old car backfiring.

== Academics ==
More than 140 associate degree programs and certificate programs are offered at Valley College.

=== Tau Alpha Epsilon Honors Society ===
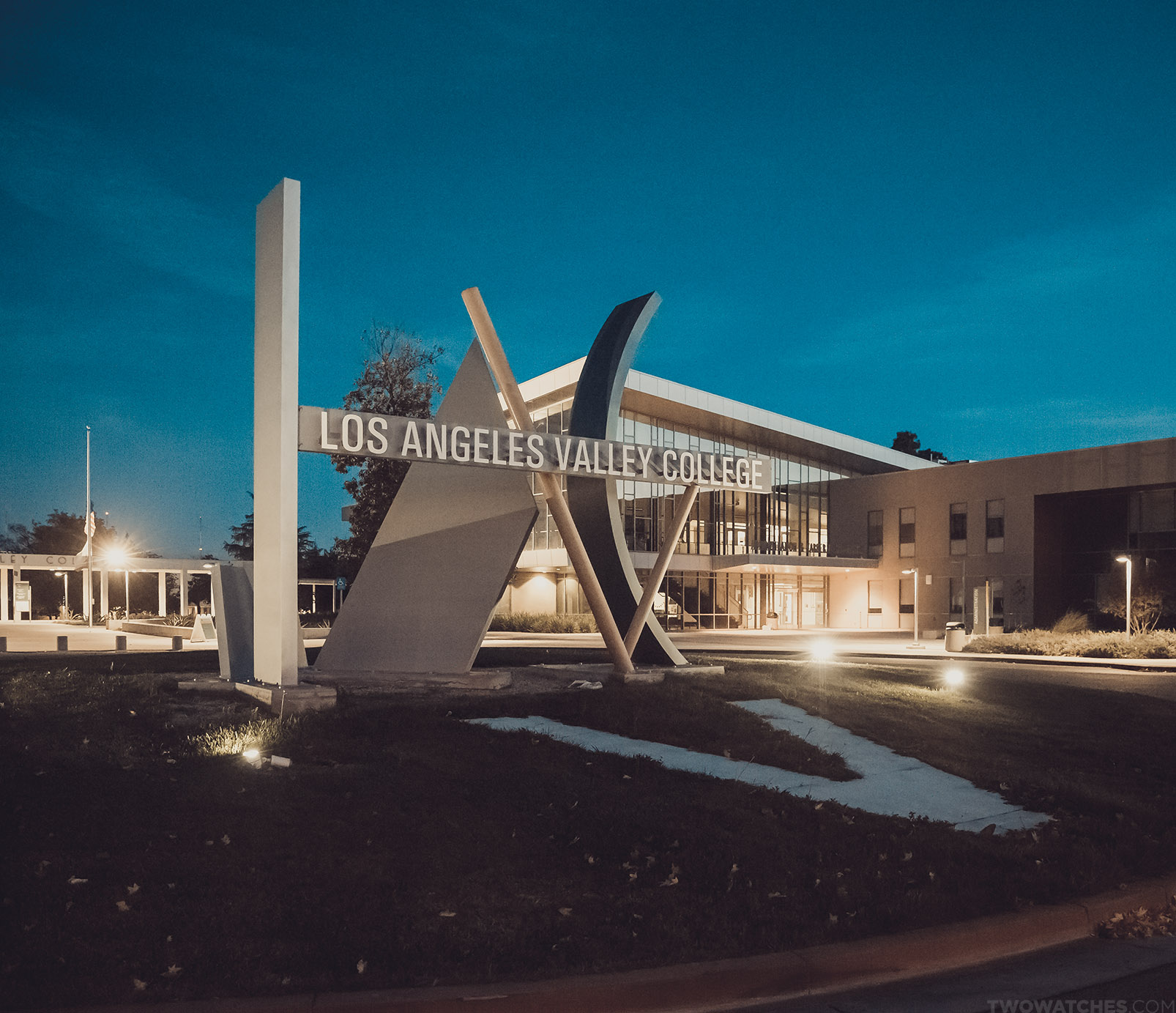
LAVC sign, front entrance

Los Angeles Valley College has its own honors society called Tau Alpha Epsilon (TAE). TAE was founded in 1949, the same year that Los Angeles Valley College was established. In 1960, the two-year honors society Phi Theta Kappa (PTK). PTK and TAE came to an agreement to join together at the Los Angeles Valley College campus. The purpose of TAE is to act as the honors society for Los Angeles Valley College, encourage academic excellence, and work with fellow clubs and organizations to better the campus and community.

== Monarch Stadium ==
Monarch Stadium is a 6,000-seat multipurpose stadium in Valley Glen, California, on the campus of the College. It was built in 1951, and has always been the home of the college's Monarchs football, soccer and track and field teams. It also hosts its track meetings at the stadium though that activity has been curtailed since the school dropped its track and field program.

The stadium was remodeled in 2006 and also hosts other sporting events and community events. Scenes from the Clueless episode "Homecoming Queen" were filmed here.

== See also ==
- Great Wall of Los Angeles
- Monarch Stadium
