= Ventura College =

Public community college in Ventura, California

- Type: Public community college
- Established: 1925
- Parent institution: Ventura County Community College District
- Endowment: $1.1 million (2011/2012)
- President: Claudia Lourido-Habib
- Faculty: 141 full-time faculty (fall 2011)
- Students: 13,737 [2012]
- Location: Ventura, California, U.S. 34.2776°N 119.2317°W
- Campus: 112 acres (45 ha)
- Colors: Orange; Black
- Nickname: Pirates
- Sporting affiliations: CCCAA – WSC, SCFA (football)
- Website: venturacollege.edu
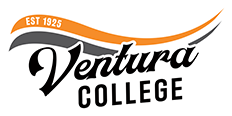

Ventura College is a public community college in Ventura, California. Established in 1925, the college has a 112-acre (45 ha) campus with an enrollment of 13,763 students. It is part of the Ventura County Community College District.

== History ==
Ventura College was established as the first college in Ventura County in 1925, when a junior college department was added at Ventura Union High School. In 1929, the Ventura High School District adopted the four-four plan of secondary education, providing four years of junior high school (grades 7–10) and four years of high school/junior college (grades 11–14). The next year, Ventura Junior College, as the senior four-year school was then known, was moved to a new campus at Main and Catalina Streets in Ventura, the present location of Ventura High School.

In 1952, responding to recommendations from a commissioned study concerning population growth and building needs, the Ventura High School District adopted a 3-3-2 organization, with three years of junior high school (grades 7–9), three years of high school (grades 10–12) and two years of higher education. Ventura Junior College became Ventura College, a two-year institution for the freshman and sophomore years of college.

In 1955, the college moved to its present 112 acres (45 ha) hillside campus at 4667 Telegraph Road in the eastern part of Ventura – so close to the ocean that there is a clear view of the Channel Islands from several spots on campus. In 1962, the voters of Ventura County authorized the formation of a community college district separate from any other public school entity.

In 1974, the college began offering classes in Fillmore to serve the Santa Clara River Valley's predominantly Hispanic population. In 1980, the East Campus (then known as the Santa Paula Vocational Center) moved to its current location on Dean Drive in Santa Paula. In addition to the East Campus, Ventura College currently utilizes classrooms at Fillmore High School, and occasionally uses the facilities at other community locations.

Ventura County voters went to the polls in March 2002 and voted to authorize a $356 million general obligation bond to renovate and expand all three campuses and the district training facilities for police, fire, and sheriff's officers. The first Ventura College building constructed using bond funds was the Library and Learning Resources Center, which opened in January 2005. The remodeled Student Services Center opened in April 2008, and the Sportsplex in 2009. The Advanced Technology Center, General Purposes Classroom Building and the Health Sciences Center buildings are currently under construction, as is the training facility for sheriff officers. The Performing Arts Complex and the buildings housing the college's technical programs are also currently under renovation.

Ventura College serves a diverse student body through both credit and non-credit offerings. The college offers associate of arts or associate of science degrees in thirty-three majors. Students are also able to obtain an associate of arts degree in general studies, using one of three patterns to obtain the required units. In addition, the college offers certificates of achievement in thirty-five career and technical education fields, and proficiency awards in twenty-six fields. The college's Community Education program offers hundreds of classes three times a year to those interested in learning about music, dance, writing, fitness, cooking, financial planning, languages and a myriad of other topics in a non-competitive, not-for-credit environment.

The Ventura County Community College District has grown to include two additional colleges, Moorpark College and Oxnard College, collectively serving more than 36,000 students per semester. The District Administrative Center offices are located on Stanley Avenue in Ventura.

== Student life ==
While attending Ventura College, students can participate in their student government, which at Ventura College is called ASVC. The Associated Students of Ventura College (ASVC) assumes responsibility for coordinating student activities and expressing student concerns, interests, and viewpoints to the administration and college community. Students can participate in more than 17 clubs related to their various interests, ethnic background, and majors, and 19 intercollegiate athletic teams and spirit. Ventura College also provides a MESA (Mathematics, Engineering, Science Achievement) program, which serves first generation, low income students who major in STEM.

== Athletics ==
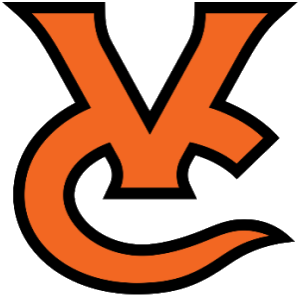
Ventura athletics logo

Ventura's athletic teams are nicknamed the Pirates. The college currently sponsors nine men's and ten women's varsity teams. Ventura College competes as a member of the California Community College Athletic Association (CCCAA) in the Western State Conference (WSC) for all sports except football, which competes in Southern California Football Association (SCFA).

=== Notable athletes ===
- Miguel Angel Garcia, Professional boxer and former WBO Featherweight and Junior Lightweight world champion.
- Rafer Alston, former professional NBA basketball player and streetballer.
- Chris Beal (attended), CIF State Champion wrestler; professional Mixed Martial Artist formerly with the UFC
- Cedric Ceballos, former NBA basketball player.
- Robert Fick, former MLB baseball player
- Terrance Dotsy, American football player
- Brook Jacoby, former MLB baseball player
- Jessie Lemonier, professional football player
- Jake Luton, professional football player
- Jordan Cameron, professional football player
- Elmer McCall, former Collegiate (Ventura College, DePauw University) and High School (California, South Bend Central High); NJCAA Finalist (1951), IHSAA Title (1953), ICC Champion (1968),
- Sun Mingming, Chinese professional basketball player and tallest professional basketball player.
- Zack Thornton, baseball pitcher

== Other notable alumni ==
- Richard Pinedo pleaded guilty to one count of identity fraud in connection to the Russian interference in the 2016 United States elections after allegedly selling stolen bank account information to individuals suspected of interfering in the election through the use of Auction Essistance, an online marketplace.
- Michele Serros, American author, poet, comedic social commentator and writer for the George Lopez TV series.

== Gallery ==
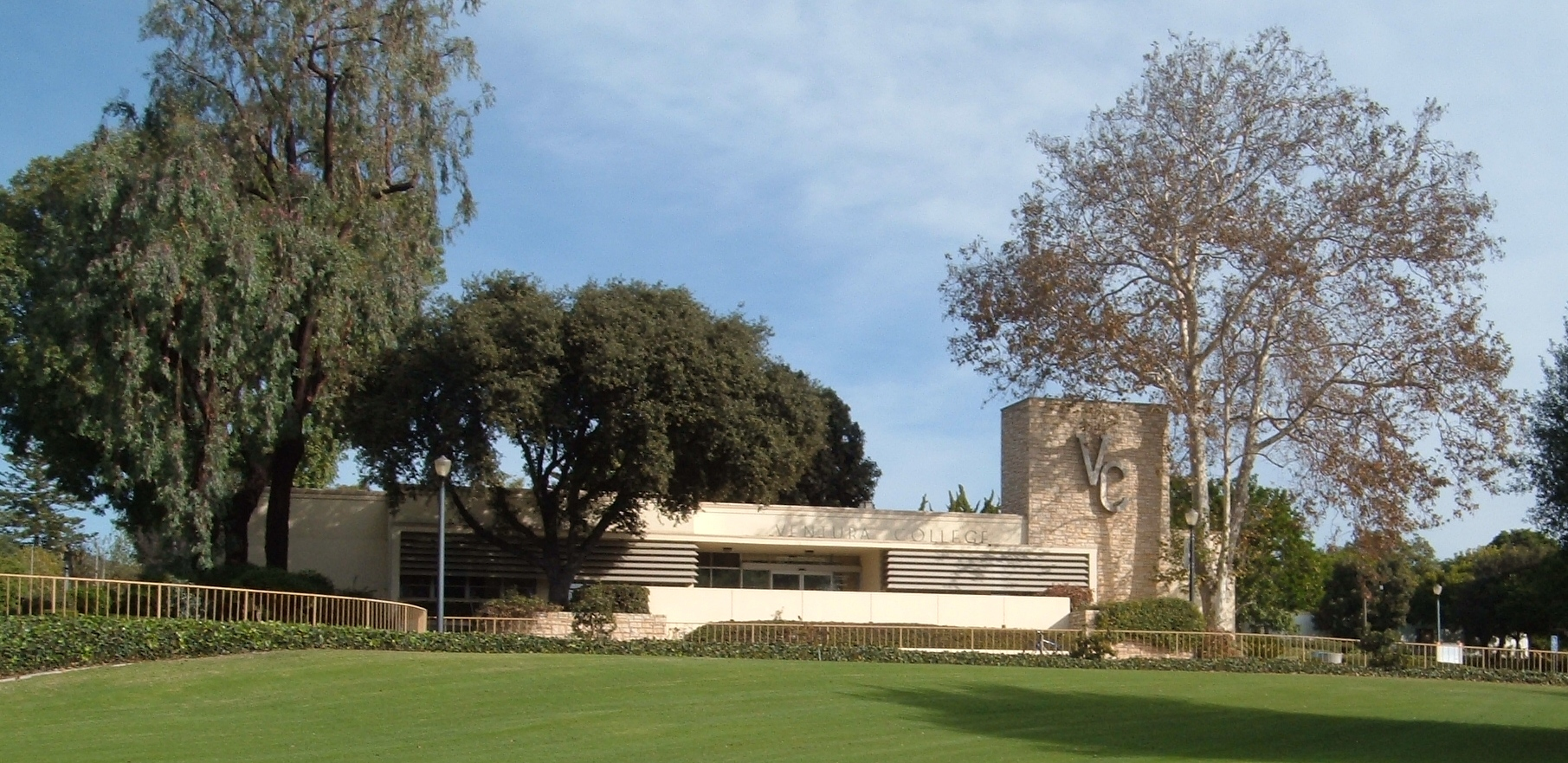
Ventura College administration building

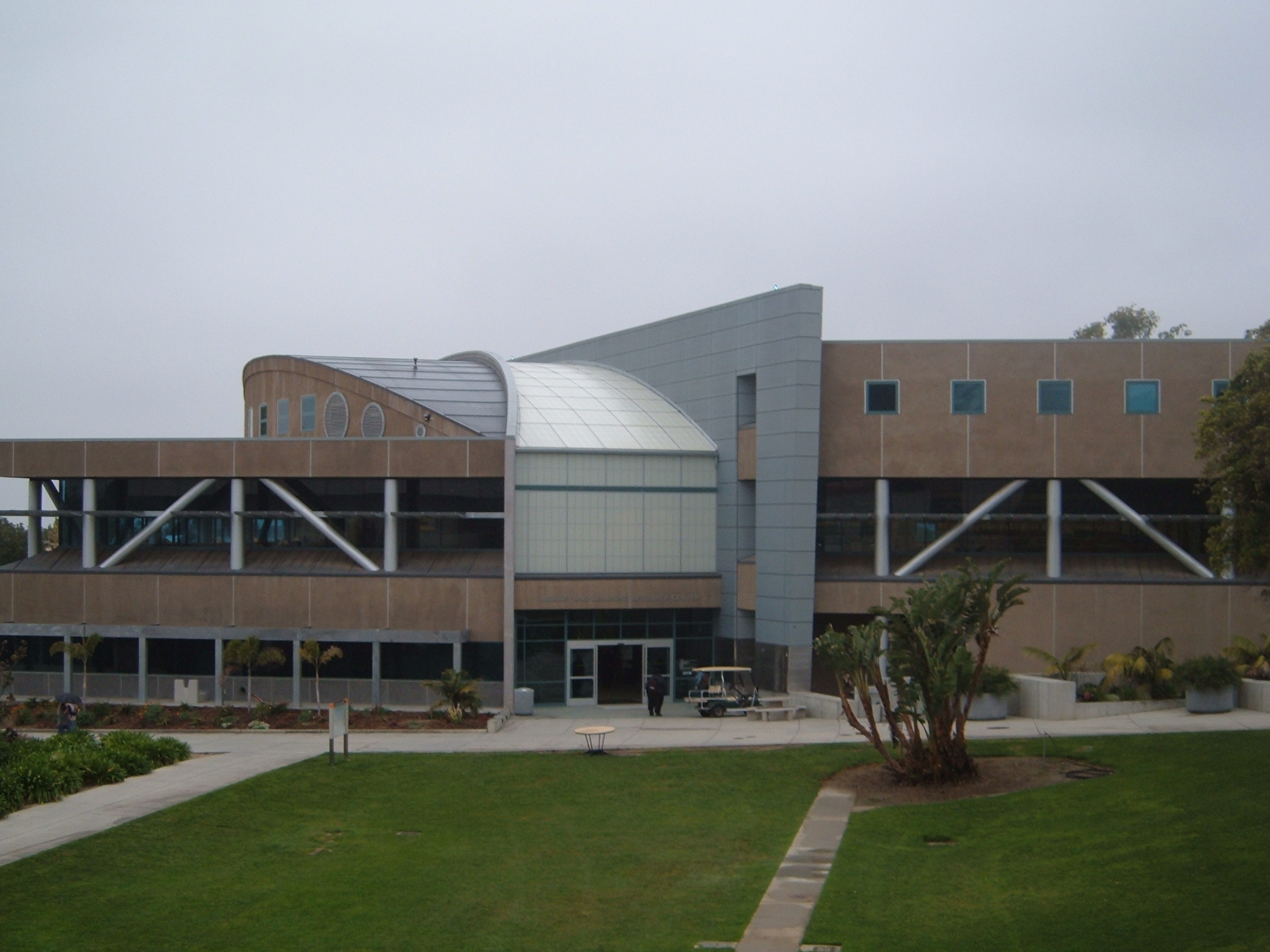
The new Library and Learning Resource Center

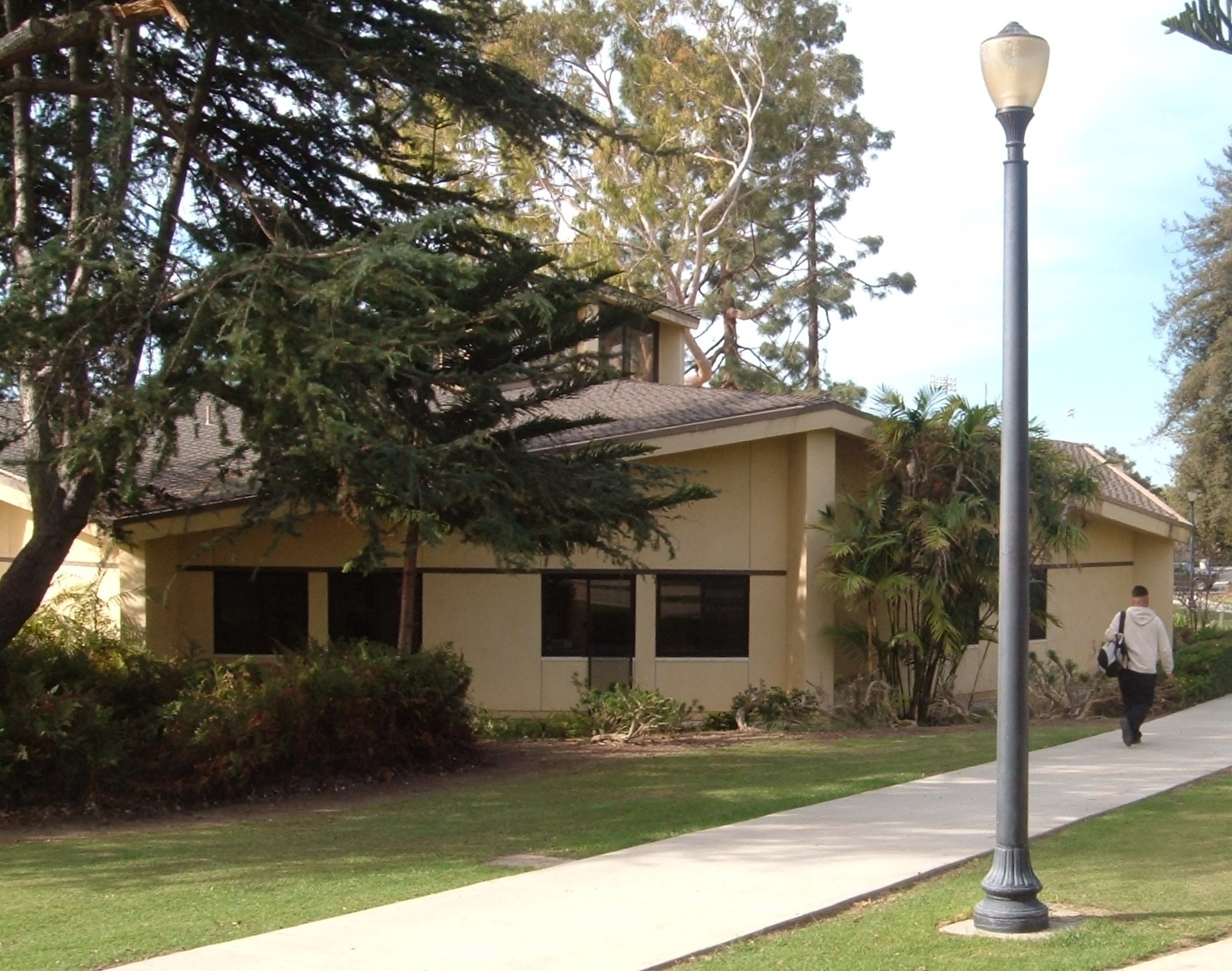
Guthrie Hall

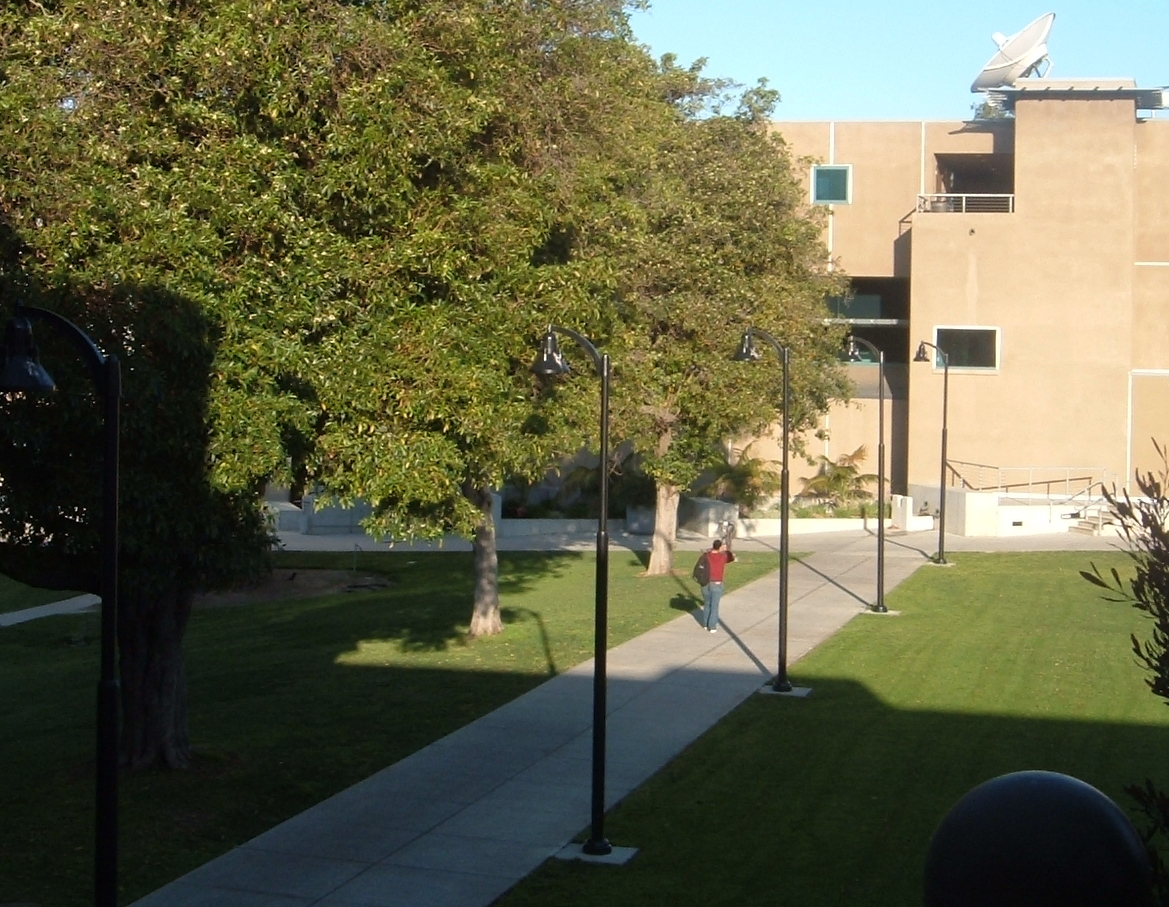
Walkaway
