= Bakersfield Renegades =

Athletics program that represents Bakersfield College

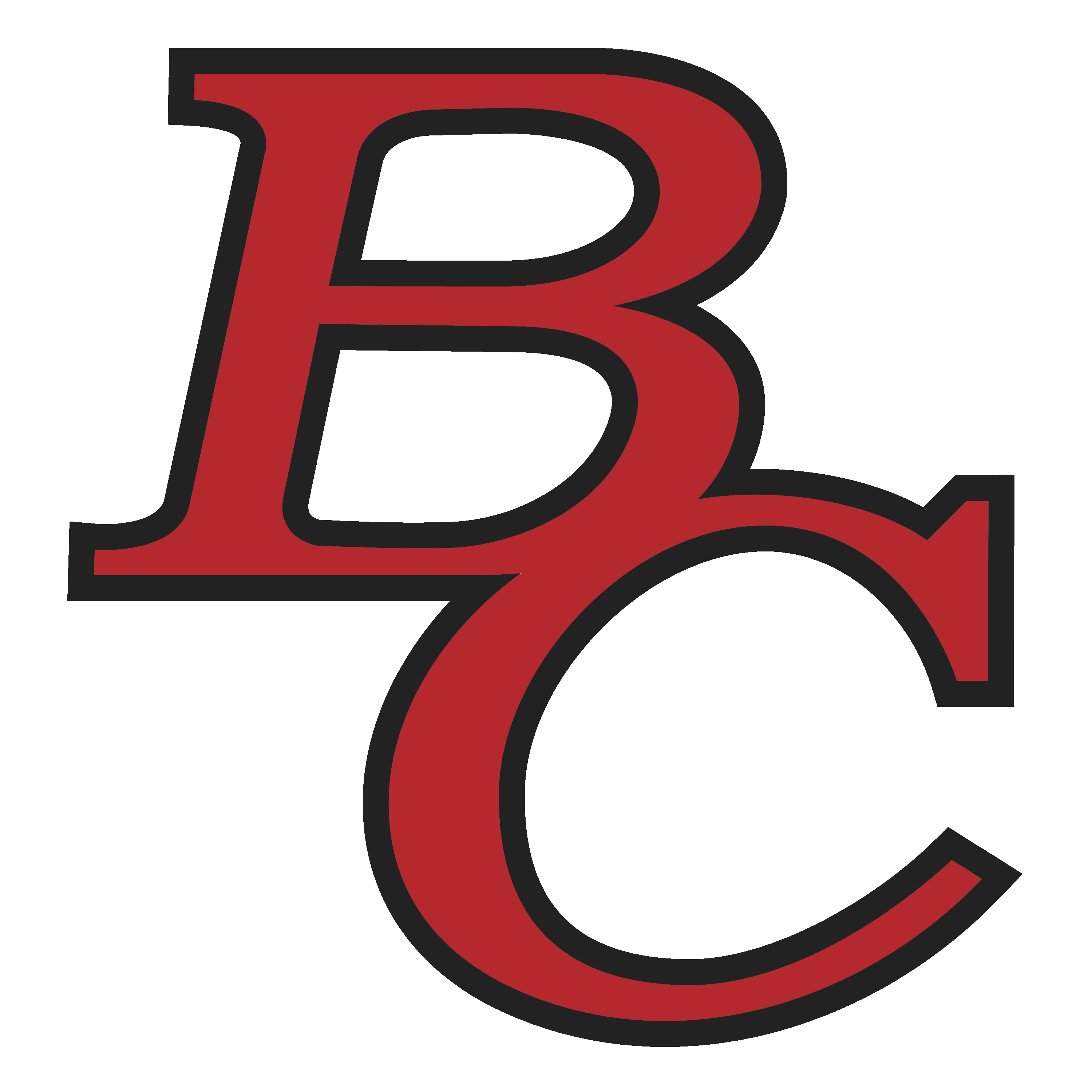
- University: Bakersfield College
- Nickname: Renegades, Gades
- California Community College Athletic Association: Southern California
- Conference: Western State Conference
- Athletic director: Lynn Kennedy
- Location: Bakersfield, California
- Varsity teams: 22 (10 Men and 12 Women)
- Football stadium: Memorial Stadium
- Basketball arena: Gil Bishop Sports Center
- Baseball stadium: Gerry Collis Field
- Soccer stadium: Bakersfield College Soccer Field
- Colors: Red
- Mascot: Renegade Knight
- Fight song: BC Fight Song
- Website: www.gogades.com/landing/index

The Bakersfield Renegades (referred to as BC Renegades or Gades) represent Bakersfield College in 22 sports. The college competes in the Western State Conference, which is affiliated with the California Community College Athletic Association.

== Varsity sports ==
Bakersfield College competes in 20 varsity sports teams; 10 men's and 12 women's:

Men's sports

- Baseball
- Basketball
- Cross Country
- Football
- Golf
- Soccer
- Swimming
- Tennis
- Track & Field
- Wrestling

Women's sports

- Basketball
- Beach Volleyball
- Cross Country
- Golf
- Soccer
- Softball
- Swimming
- Tennis
- Track & Field
- Volleyball
- Water Polo
- Wrestling

== Football ==
The following is the record for BC football. It is effective as of 2015.

- National Championships: 1953, 1959, 1976, 1988, 2012
- Potato Bowl: 1952, 1955, 1957, 1958, 1960, 1963, 1965, 1976, 1979, 1981, 1987, 1988, 1989, 1990, 1992, 1993, 1994,1995, 1996, 1997, 1998, 1999, 2000, 2001
- Southern California Championship:1998, 2001, 2007, 2012
- California State Championship: 2007, 2012
- Play-Off Bowls: 1967, 1969, 1970, 1998, 2001, 2005, 2007, 2009, 2012
- Conference Champions: Over 20 Times
