= Compton College =

Community college in Compton, California, US

Coordinates: 33°52′39″N 118°12′39″W

- Former names: Compton Community College (1927–1932); Compton Junior College (1932–1949); Compton Community College; El Camino College Compton Center
- Type: Public community college
- Established: 1927; 99 years ago
- Undergraduates: 6,780
- Location: Compton, California, U.S.
- Campus: Urban
- Colors: Red & white
- Nickname: Coyotes
- Mascot: Coyotes
- Website: www.compton.edu

Compton College is a public community college in Compton, California. From 2006, when it lost its regional accreditation, to 2017, when it regained that accreditation, it operated as a part of El Camino College. Before and after the partnership with El Camino College, the college was operated by the Compton Community College District.

== History ==
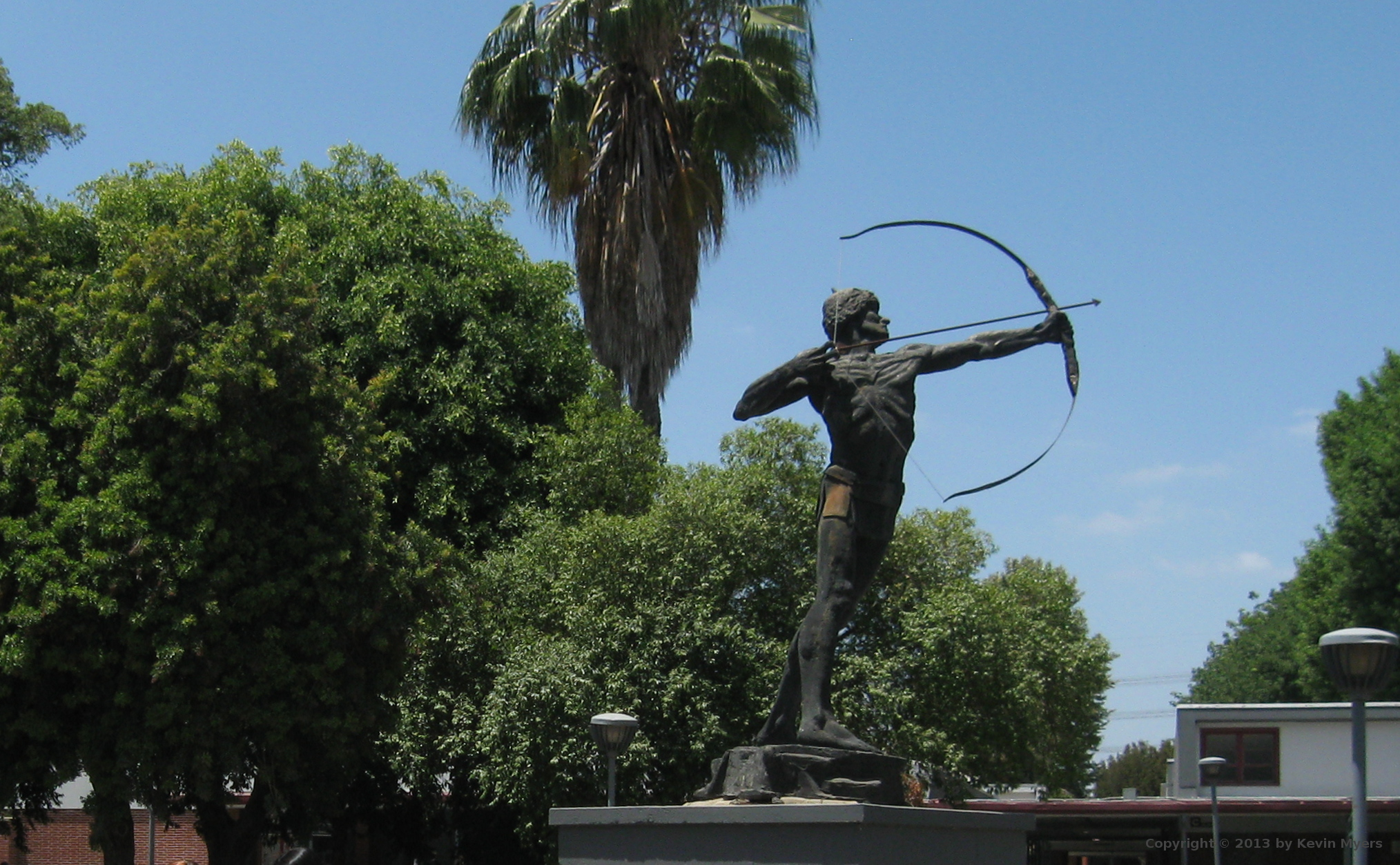
Statue of Apollo The Archer on the Compton College campus.

Compton Community College was established in 1927 as a component of Compton Union High School. From 1932 to 1949, it operated as a four-year junior college, incorporating the last two years of high school as well as the first two years of college.

The Compton Union campus shared by the high school and college was devastated by 1933 Long Beach earthquake, leaving two buildings standing. Nobody on campus was killed.

Students at the Night Sky Festival, 2024

In the 1940s, several thousand Compton College students entered the armed forces, and during World War II the campus housed a military unit and a defense plant.

In 1950, voters approved a bond issue separating the college from the high school district. The new college campus was then constructed at the college's present site, 1111 East Artesia Boulevard. Classes began on the new campus in the fall of 1953.

In the 1960s, the composition of the student body changed dramatically from predominantly Caucasian to overwhelmingly African-American. As a result, it has sometimes been called "California’s historically black college."

In 1970, the Board of Trustees appointed the institution's first African-American President/Superintendent, Abel B. Sykes Jr. Highlights of his 14-year administration included the construction of the first two new campus buildings since 1952: the Jane Astredo Allied Health Building and the Abel B. Sykes Jr. Child Development Center (named after him in 1995).

The 1980s was a period of reduced funding and partial retrenchment for the institution, but by the early 1990s, the college had once again stabilized. The second major demographic shift occurred in the 1990s, making the campus population 46% African-American and 46% Hispanic (3% White, Non-Hispanic; 3% APISA; 2% other).

In 1996, the Board appointed Ulis C. Williams as Interim President/Superintendent and in January 1997, made this appointment permanent.

=== Loss of accreditation ===
In 2004, the college began experiencing significant turmoil caused by a "corrupt board and financial insolvency". In May 2004, the state installed Arthur Tyler Jr. as Special Trustee to help the Compton Community College District achieve fiscal stability and integrity. In August, the State Chancellor issued another executive order (2004-02) authorizing the continuing authority of the Special Trustee to manage the college, and to suspend for up to a year the powers of the governing board of the college, or of any members of that board, and to exercise any powers or responsibilities or to take any official action with respect to the management of the college. Interim President/Superintendent Rita Cepeda was hired in February 2005 to assist with the recovery of the college.

The next year, the executive director of the Accrediting Commission for Community and Junior Colleges (ACCJC), Barbara Beno, informed the college of the commission's decision to terminate the college's accreditation. In July 2005, the State Chancellor assigned Jamillah Moore, Senior Vice Chancellor of the California Community Colleges system, as the interim President/Superintendent and Charles Ratliff as the Special Trustee with the impending departure of both Cepeda and Tyler. The college began its appeal to the commission regarding the termination decision.

On March 1, 2006, a third Special Trustee, Thomas Henry, was assigned to the college district to continue the implementation of AB 61 and the development of AB 318 to keep the doors open for students. On June 30, 2006, Governor Arnold Schwarzenegger signed AB 318 (D-Dymally) into law, giving the college district a $30 million loan for recovery and the opportunity to partner with a college of good standing to offer accredited courses. The bill also gave the Fiscal Crisis and Management Assistance Team (FCMAT) the responsibilities to conduct a comprehensive assessment and to develop a recovery plan for the college to regain its accreditation.

Five months later, the Special Trustee approved the Memorandum of Understanding (MOU) with El Camino College District to solidify the partnerships between the two districts. Under this MOU, the campus became a center of El Camino College. The Office of the President/Superintendent was replaced by the Office of Provost/Chief Executive Officer (CEO). The center is officially established as the Compton Community Educational Center. At midnight, Compton Community College lost its accreditation. Shortly thereafter, the Compton Community Educational Center officially became part of El Camino College with Doris P. Givens serving as the Provost/CEO. Lawrence M. Cox became Provost/CEO from 2008 to 2010.

=== Accreditation regained ===
On June 7, 2017, Compton College was restored to full accreditation. This followed years of rebuilding under President Keith Curry, who was provost of the campus while it was partnered with El Camino College.

== Campus ==
The 40,000-square-foot (3,700 m^{2}) library on campus opened in 2014. Its opening was originally scheduled for 2007. At that time, it had a cost of $25 million. The opening was delayed by almost seven years with an additional $4 million spent due to violations in the building code. It was extensively renovated.

== Student demographics ==
Student demographics as of Fall 2023
Race and ethnicity	Total
Hispanic	63%
African American	25%
Asian	3%
Multiracial	3%
Unknown	2%
White	2%
Filipino	1%

== Notable alumni ==
- Billy Anderson, professional football player
- Memo Arzate, professional soccer player
- Don Bandy, professional football player
- Justin Carter, professional basketball player
- James Coburn, actor
- Coolio, rapper
- Iva Toguri D'Aquino, identified as Tokyo Rose
- Louella Daetweiler, professional baseball player
- Snoop Dogg, rapper
- Carl Earn, tennis player
- Jamaa Fanaka, filmmaker
- Carl Fennema, professional football player
- William Denby Hanna, cartoon film producer, co-founder of Hanna-Barbera Productions (now known as Cartoon Network Studios)
- Sim Iness, Olympic champion
- Cornelius Johnson, Olympic champion (1936, high jump)
- Don Klosterman, professional football player and executive
- Yuri Kochiyama, Japanese-American human rights activist
- John LoVetere, professional football player
- Wayne Maunder, actor
- Hugh McElhenny, professional football player
- Billy G. Mills (born 1929), Los Angeles City Council member, 1963–74, Superior Court judge thereafter
- Randy Moore, professional baseball player
- Tino Nuñez, professional soccer player
- Ed Peasley, professional football player and coach
- Joe Perry, professional football player
- Carl Pohlad, owner of the Minnesota Twins
- Pete Rozelle, National Football League (NFL) commissioner
- Bobby Thompson, professional football player
- Don Wilson, professional baseball player
