= California Community College Athletic Association =

Collegiate athletics organization in California, US

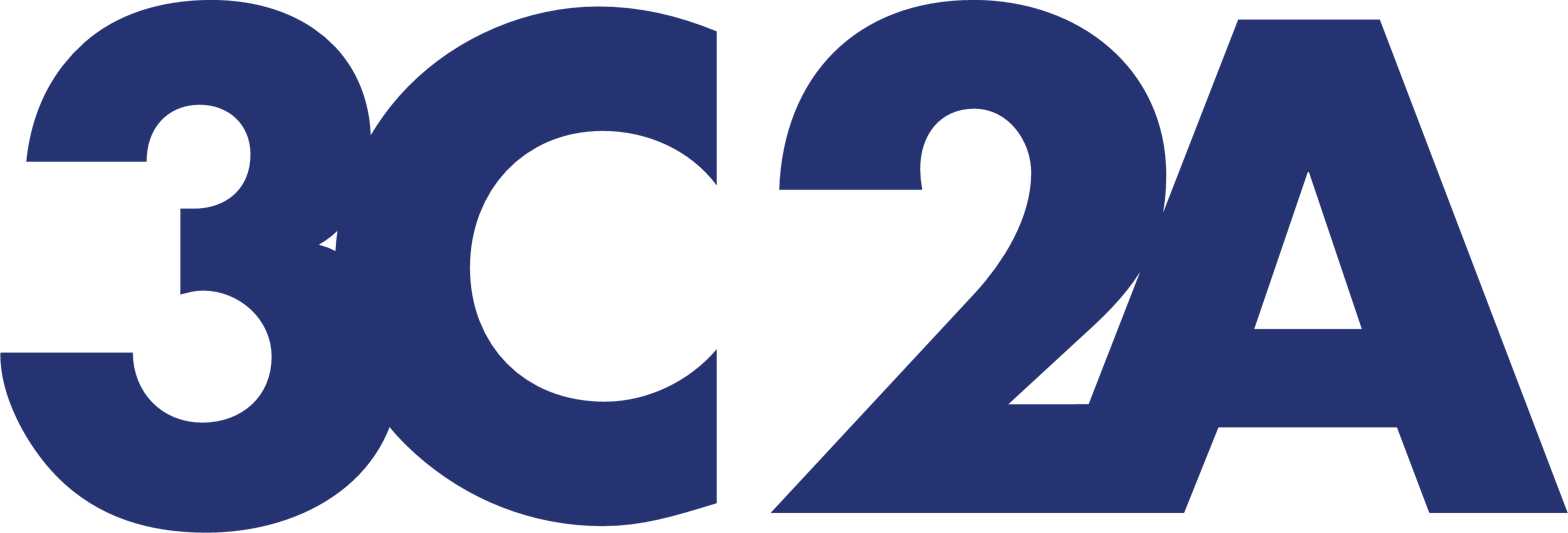
- Abbreviation: 3C2A
- Formation: 1929; 97 years ago
- Type: Association
- Headquarters: Sacramento
- Region served: California, U.S.
- Members: 109 schools
- Executive director: Jennifer Cardone
- Website: cccaasports.org

Previous logo until 2023

The California Community College Athletic Association (3C2A; formerly CCCAA) is a sports association of community colleges in the U.S. state of California. It oversees 108 athletic programs throughout the state. The organization was formed in 1929 as the California Junior College Federation to unify programs in Northern and Southern California.

Over 26,000 student athletes participate annually in intercollegiate athletics at California’s community colleges and more than 100 regional and state final events produce champions in 24 men’s and women’s sports each year. The majority of student athletes participating at a California community college transfer to a four-year college or university to continue their academic and athletic endeavors.

There are nine all-sport conferences, two football-only conferences, and three wrestling-only alliances.

== Sports ==
The CCCAA sponsors championships in the following sports:

Conference sports
Sport	Men's	Women's
Badminton	✗	✓
Baseball	✓	✗
Basketball	✓	✓
Beach volleyball	✗	✓
Cross country	✓	✓
Football	✓	✗
Golf	✓	✓
Soccer	✓	✓
Softball	✗	✓
Swimming & Diving	✓	✓
Tennis	✓	✓
Track and field (outdoor)	✓	✓
Volleyball	✓	✓
Water polo	✓	✓
Wrestling	✓	✓

=== Records ===
- List of CCCAA Championship records in track and field

== Conferences ==
=== Bay Valley ===
- College of Alameda
- College of Marin
- Contra Costa College
- Laney College
- Los Medanos College
- Mendocino College
- Merritt College
- Napa Valley College
- Solano College
- Yuba College

=== Big 8 ===
- American River College
- Cosumnes River College
- Diablo Valley College
- Folsom Lake College
- Modesto Junior College
- Sacramento City College
- San Joaquin Delta College
- Santa Rosa Junior College
- Sierra College

=== Central Valley ===
- Clovis Community College
- Coalinga College
- College of the Sequoias
- Columbia College
- Fresno City College
- Lemoore College
- Madera Community College
- Merced College
- Porterville College
- Reedley College
- Taft College

=== Coast ===
==== North ====
- Cañada College
- Chabot College
- City College of San Francisco
- College of San Mateo
- Foothill College
- Las Positas College
- Ohlone College
- Skyline College

==== South ====
- Cabrillo College
- De Anza College
- Evergreen Valley College
- Gavilan College
- Hartnell College
- Mission College
- Monterey Peninsula College
- San Jose City College
- West Valley College

=== Golden Valley ===
- Butte College
- Feather River College
- Lake Tahoe Community College
- Lassen College
- College of the Redwoods
- Shasta College
- College of the Siskiyous

=== Inland Empire ===
- Barstow College
- Cerro Coso Community College
- Chaffey College
- College of the Desert
- Copper Mountain College
- Crafton Hills College
- Mt. San Jacinto College
- Norco College
- Palo Verde College
- Victor Valley College

=== Orange Empire ===
- Cypress College
- Fullerton College
- Golden West College
- Irvine Valley College
- Orange Coast College
- Riverside City College
- Saddleback College
- Santa Ana College
- Santiago Canyon College

=== Pacific Coast ===
- Cuyamaca College
- Grossmont College
- Imperial Valley College
- MiraCosta College
- Palomar College
- San Bernardino Valley College
- San Diego City College
- San Diego Mesa College
- San Diego Miramar College
- Southwestern College

=== South Coast ===
- Cerritos College
- Compton College
- East Los Angeles College
- El Camino College
- Long Beach City College
- Los Angeles Harbor College
- Los Angeles Southwest College
- Los Angeles Trade-Technical College
- Mt. San Antonio College
- Pasadena City College
- Rio Hondo College

=== Western State ===
==== North ====
- Allan Hancock College
- Antelope Valley College
- Cuesta College
- Los Angeles Pierce College
- Moorpark College
- Oxnard College
- Santa Barbara City College
- Ventura College

==== South ====
- Bakersfield College
- Citrus College
- College of the Canyons
- Glendale Community College
- Los Angeles Mission College
- Los Angeles Valley College
- Santa Monica College
- West Los Angeles College
