= List of Alpha Gamma Sigma (honor society) chapters =

Alpha Gamma Sigma is the honor society of the California Community Colleges system. It was founded as the California Junior College Honor Scholarship Society at Fullerton College in 1926. It changed its name in 1932. At that time, Greek letter names for the existing chapters were drawn by lot, with Pasadena City College selecting Alpha. Once all letters of the Greek alphabet were assigned to new chapters, chapters were named using two Greek letters, with names beginning with Alpha, Gamma, and Sigma. The society notes that it did not always follow this practice and, at time, resused the name of inactive chatpers or assigned the same name to two chapters. In addition, a few chapters took names that were different from the normal naming system or never received a Greek letter designation.

Following are the chapters of Alpha Gamma Sigma, with active chapters indicated in bold and inactive chapters in italics.

| Chapter | Charter date and range | Institution | Location | Status | Ref. |
|---|---|---|---|---|---|
| **Alpha** | 1926 | Pasadena City College | Pasadena, California | Active | |
| **Beta** | 1926 | Chaffey College | Rancho Cucamonga, California | Active | |
| **Gamma** | 1927 | Glendale Community College | Glendale, California | Active | |
| **Delta** | 1926 | San Bernardino Valley College | San Bernardino, California | Active | |
| **Epsilon** | 1926 | Fullerton College | Fullerton, California | Active | |
| **Zeta** | 1947 | Mt. San Antonio College | Walnut, California | Active | |
| **Eta** | 1937 | College of San Mateo | San Mateo, California | Active | |
| **Theta** | 1928 | Santa Rosa Junior College | Santa Rosa, California | Active | |
| **Iota** | 1927 | Citrus College | Glendora, California | Active | |
| **Kappa** | 1927 | Long Beach City College | Long Beach, California | Active | |
| **Lambda** | 1926 | Bakersfield College | Bakersfield, California | Active | |
| **Mu** | 1989 | Crafton Hills College | Yucaipa, California | Active | |
| **Nu** | 1938 | Hartnell College | Salinas, California | Active | |
| **Xi** | 1939 | College of the Sequoias | Visalia, California | Active | |
| **Omicron** | 1926 | Santa Ana College | Santa Ana, California | Active | |
| **Pi** | 1959 | Los Angeles Pierce College | Los Angeles, California | Active | |
| **Rho** | 1927 | Taft College | Taft, California | Active | |
| **Sigma** | 1926 | Allan Hancock College | Santa Maria, California | Active | (Note: Chapter formed at Santa Maria Junior College, now Allan Hancock College.) |
| **Tau** | 1927 | Compton College | Compton, California | Active | |
| **Upsilon** | 1960 | Modesto Junior College | Modesto, California | Active | |
| **Phi** | 1960 | MiraCosta College | Oceanside, California | Active | |
| **Chi** | before 1956 | Monterey Peninsula College | Monterey, California | Active | |
| **Psi** | 1975 | Moorpark College | Moorpark, California | Active | |
| Psi | | Sierra College | Rocklin, California | Inactive | |
| **Omega** | 1934 | City College of San Francisco | San Francisco, California | Active | |
| Alpha Alpha | | | | Inactive ? | |
| **Alpha Beta** | 1938 | San Joaquin Delta College | Stockton, California | Active | |
| **Alpha Gamma** | 1946 | Santa Monica College | Santa Monica, California | Active | |
| **Alpha Delta** | 1940 | Lassen Community College | Susanville, California | Active | |
| **Alpha Epsilon** | 1942 | Yuba College | Yuba County, California | Active | |
| **Alpha Zeta** | before 1956 | Fresno City College | Fresno, California | Active | |
| **Alpha Eta** | before 1956 | Shasta College | Redding, California | Active | |
| **Alpha Theta** | 1947 | Solano Community College | Fairfield, California | Active | |
| **Alpha Iota** | 1939 | Antelope Valley College | Lancaster, California | Active | |
| **Alpha Kappa** | before 1956 | Orange Coast College | Costa Mesa, California | Active | |
| **Alpha Lambda** | 1947 | East Los Angeles College | Monterey Park, California | Active | |
| **Rho Alpha Mu** | 1960 | Gavilan College | Gilroy, California | Active | |
| **Alpha Nu** | before 1960 | Palomar College | San Diego County, California | Active | |
| **Alpha Xi** | 1955 | Foothill College | Los Altos Hills, California | Active | |
| **Alpha Omicron** | 1946 | Napa Valley College | Napa, California | Active | |
| **Alpha Pi** | 1956 | American River College | Sacramento, California | Active | |
| **Alpha Rho** | 1957 | Porterville College | Porterville, California | Active | |
| **Alpha Sigma** | 1948 | College of Marin – Kentfield | Kentfield, California | Active | |
| **Alpha Tau** | before 1956 | San Diego City College | San Diego, California | Active | |
| **Alpha Upsilon** | 1953 | Contra Costa College | San Pablo, California | Active | |
| **Alpha Phi** | before 1956 | El Camino College | Alondra Park, California | Active | |
| **Alpha Chi** | before 1956 | Lemoore College | Lemoore, California | Active | (Note: Chapter formed at West Hills College, now called Lemoore College.) |
| **Alpha Psi** | before 1956 | Los Angeles Harbor College | Wilmington, California | Active | |
| **Alpha Omega** | 1938 | Reedley College | Reedley, California | Active | |
| Gamma Alpha | | | | Inactive ? | |
| **Gamma Beta** | before 1956 | Ventura College | Ventura, California | Active | |
| **Gamma Gamma** | c. 1959 | Cuesta College | San Luis Obispo, California | Active | |
| **Gamma Delta** | before 1956 | Imperial Valley College | Imperial County, California | Active | |
| **Gamma Epsilon** | 198x ? | Los Medanos College | Pittsburg, California | Active | |
| Gamma Zeta | 1995 | Norco College | Norco, California | Inactive | (Note: Chapter formed at Riverside Community College, Norco, now called Norco College.) |
| **Gamma Eta** | 1996 | Los Angeles Mission College | Los Angeles, California | Active | |
| **Gamma Theta** | 1953 | Los Angeles Trade–Technical College | Los Angeles, California | Active | |
| **Gamma Iota** | 1963 | West Valley College | Saratoga, California | Active | |
| **Gamma Kappa** | 1960 | College of the Siskiyous | Siskiyou County, California | Active | |
| **Gamma Lambda** | 1970 | Victor Valley College | Victorville, California | Active | |
| **Gamma Mu** | | Moreno Valley College | Moreno Valley, California | Active | |
| Gamma Nu | | | | Inactive ? | |
| **Gamma Xi** | March 4, 1926 – 1928; 1961 | Sacramento City College | Sacramento, California | Active | |
| **Gamma Omicron** | 1958 | Cerritos College | Norwalk, California | Active | |
| **Gamma Pi** | | Southwestern College | Chula Vista, California | Active | |
| **Gamma Rho** | 1962 | College of the Redwoods | Eureka, California | Active | |
| **Gamma Sigma** | 1948 | Riverside Community College | Riverside, California | Active | |
| **Gamma Tau** | 1962 | Merced College | Merced, California | Active | |
| **Gamma Upsilon** | 1958 | Merritt College | Oakland, California | Active | |
| **Gamma Phi** | 1961 | Cabrillo College | Aptos, California | Active | |
| **Gamma Chi** | 1962 | Barstow Community College | Barstow, California | Active | |
| **Gamma Psi** | 1957 | Diablo Valley College | Pleasant Hill, California | Active | |
| **Gamma Omega** | 1957 | Palo Verde College | Blythe, California | Active | |
| **Gamma Omega** | 1954 | San Jose City College | San Jose, California | Active | |
| **Sigma Alpha** | 1962 | College of the Desert | Palm Desert, California | Active | |
| **Sigma Beta** | 1982 | Ohlone College | Fremont, California | Active | |
| **Sigma Gamma** | c. 1999 | Madera Community College | Madera, California | Active | |
| **Sigma Gamma** | c. 1999 | Clovis Community College | Fresno, California | Active | |
| **Sigma Gamma** | c. 1999 | Madera Community College Oakhurst Campus | Oakhurst, California | Active | (Note: Chapter originally formed at the three Reedley College North Centers (Madera, Clovis, and Oakhurst), now called Madera Community College, Clovis Community College, and Madera Community College Oakhurst Campus.) |
| **Sigma Delta** | 1979 | San Diego Miramar College | San Diego, California | Active | |
| **Sigma Epsilon** | before 1973 | Saddleback College | Mission Viejo, California | Active | |
| **Sigma Zeta** | | American River College | Sacramento, California | Active | |
| Sigma Eta | | | | Inactive ? | |
| **Sigma Theta** | 1981 | Las Positas College | Livermore, California | Active | |
| **Sigma Iota** | 1989 | Mission College | Santa Clara, California | Active | |
| **Sigma Kappa** | 1972 | College of the Canyons | Santa Clarita, California | Active | |
| Sigma Lambda | | | | Inactive ? | |
| Sigma Mu | | | | Inactive ? | |
| **Sigma Nu** | 1980 | College of Marin – Indian Valley Campus | Novato, California | Active | |
| **Sigma Xi** | 1972 | Grossmont College | El Cajon, California | Active | |
| **Sigma Omicron** | | Skyline College | San Bruno, California | Active | |
| **Sigma Pi** | 1963 | Golden West College | Huntington Beach, California | Active | |
| **Sigma Rho** | 1961 | Chabot College | Hayward, California | Active | |
| Sigma Sigma | | | | Inactive ? | |
| **Sigma Tau** | 1968 | Mt. San Jacinto College | Riverside County, California | Active | |
| **Sigma Upsilon** | 1979 | San Diego Mesa College | San Diego, California | Active | |
| **Sigma Phi** | c. 1968 | Rio Hondo College | Whittier, California | Active | |
| **Sigma Chi** | 1978 | Chabot College (Evening) | Hayward, California | Active | |
| **Sigma Psi** | 1965 | Cypress College | Cypress, California | Active | |
| **Sigma Psi** | 1965 | Cuyamaca College | Rancho San Diego, California | Active | |
| **Sigma Omega** | 1977 | Oxnard College | Oxnard, California | Active | |
| **Alpha Delta Sigma** | | Los Angeles City College | Los Angeles, California | Active | |
| **Beta Kappa** | 1975 | Los Angeles Southwest College | Los Angeles, California | Active | |
| **Delta Chi** | 1973 | Long Beach City College, Pacific Coat Campus | Long Beach, California | Active | |
| **Delta Psi** | 1968 | Cañada College | Redwood City, California | Active | |
| **Lambda Tau** | 1987 | Lake Tahoe Community College | South Lake Tahoe, California | Active | |
| **Sigma Delta Chi** | c. 1969 | De Anza College | Cupertino, California | Active | |
| **Sigma Phi Upsilon** | | Laney College | Oakland, California | Active | |
| **Omega Sigma Rho** | | Irvine Valley College | Irvine, California | Active | |
| **Psi Lambda Kappa** | 1963 | West Los Angeles College | Culver City, California | Active | |
| **Aquarius** | 1973 | Allan Hancock College Vanderberg Division | Vandenberg Space Force Base, Santa Barbara County, California | Active | |
| | | Butte College | Chico, Orland, and Oroville, California | Inactive | |
| | | Cerro Coso Community College | Ridgecrest, California | Inactive | |
| | | Coastline Community College | Orange County, California | Inactive | |
| | | College of Alameda | Alameda, California | Inactive | |
| | | Cosumnes River College | Sacramento, California | Inactive | |
| | | Evergreen Valley College | San Jose, California | Inactive | |
| | | Feather River College | Quincy, California | Inactive | |
| | | Los Angeles Valley College | Los Angeles, California | Inactive | |
| | | Mendocino College | Ukiah, California | Inactive | |
| | | Santa Barbara City College | Santa Barbara, California | Inactive | |
| | | Vista College | Berkeley, California | Inactive | (Note: Chapter formed at Vista Community College, now Berkeley City College.) |
