= Al Baldock =

American football coach (1929–2009)

Biographical details
- Born: December 17, 1929; Holly, Texas, U.S.
- Died: September 14, 2009 (aged 79); Taft, California, U.S.

Playing career

Football
- 1949–1950: USC
- 1951–1952: Fort Riley
- 1953: USC
- Position: End

Coaching career (HC unless noted)

Football
- 1951–1952: Fort Riley
- 1954: USC (freshmen)
- 1955: Leuzinger HS (CA) (assistant)
- 1956–1958: Taft (assistant)
- 1959–1961: Hancock
- 1962–1968: Sequoias
- 1969–1971: San Diego State (assistant)
- 1972–1974: Los Angeles City
- 1976–1989: Taft
- 1991–1993: Taft

Track and field
- 1951–1952: Fort Riley
- 1956–1959: Taft

Volleyball
- 1951–1952: Fort Riley

Head coaching record
- Bowls: 9–5 (junior college)
- Tournaments: Football; 2–0–1 (California JC large division playoffs); 4–0 (California JC Division II playoffs)

Accomplishments and honors

Championships
- Football; 2 junior college national (1982, 1984); 1 California JC large division (1973); 2 California JC Division II (1977, 1979); 5 CCJCA/Central (1960–1961, 1976–1977, 1979); 2 Valley Conference (1963, 1965); 1 SCC (1973); 1 WSC (1981); 2 Metropolitan Conference (1982–1983); 1 Pac-9 (1984); 2 Central Valley Conference (1986–1987); 1 Coast Valley Conference (1989)

Alvin Olen Baldock (December 17, 1929 – September 14, 2009) was an American college football player and coach. He served as the head football coach at Allan Hancock College in Santa Maria, California from 1959 to 1961, the College of the Sequoias in Visalia, California from 1962 to 1968, and the Los Angeles City College from 1972 to 1974, and Taft College in Taft, California from 1976 to 1989 and 1991 to 1993. Baldock led Taft to junior college national championships by JC-Grid-Wire in 1982 and 1984.

Baldock was born on December 17, 1929, in Holly, Texas. He attended the University of Southern California (USC), where played college football as an end. His time at USC was interrupted for two year by service in the United States Army, 1951 and 1952, when was head football, track, and volleyball coach for the 25th Artillery Battalion at Fort Riley in Kansas.

Baldock died on September 14, 2009, in Taft.

== Head coaching record ==
=== Junior college football ===
Year	Team	Overall	Conference	Standing	Bowl/playoffs
Hancock Bulldogs (Central California Junior College Association) (1959–1961)
1959	Hancock	3–5–1	1–4–1	6th	
1960	Hancock	10–0	6–0	1st	W Orange Show Bowl
1961	Hancock	8–2	6–0	1st	L Prune Bowl
Hancock:		21–7–1	13–4–1		
Sequoias Giants (Valley Conference) (1962–1968)
1962	Sequoias	6–2–1	2–2–1	4th	
1963	Sequoias	8–1	5–0	1st	
1964	Sequoias	6–2–1	3–2	T–3rd	
1965	Sequoias	7–2–1	4–0–1	1st	W Empire Bowl
1966	Sequoias	6–3	2–3	T–3rd	
1967	Sequoias	6–1–1	4–1	2nd	
1968	Sequoias	7–2	4–1	2nd	
Sequoias:		46–13–4	24–9–2		
Los Angeles City Cubs (Southern California Conference) (1972–1974)
1972	Los Angeles City		4–3	3rd	
1973	Los Angeles City	10–2–1	6–1	T–1st	T California JC large division championship
1974	Los Angeles City	6–4	4–3	T–4th	
Los Angeles City:			14–7		
Taft Cougars (Central Conference) (1976–1979)
1976	Taft	10–1	4–1	1st	W Central-Desert Bowl
1977	Taft	11–0	5–0	1st	W California JC Division II championship
1978	Taft	6–3	3–1	2nd	
1979	Taft	10–2	4–0	1st	W California JC Division II championship, L Potato Bowl
Taft Cougars (Metropolitan Conference) (1980)
1980	Taft	8–2–1	4–2	T–2nd	W Potato Bowl
Taft Cougars (Western State Conference) (1981)
1981	Taft	9–1	6–0	1st	W Potato Bowl
Taft Cougars (Metropolitan Conference) (1982–1983)
1982	Taft	11–0	6–0	1st	W Potato Bowl
1983	Taft	9–1	5–0	1st	L Potato Bowl
Taft Cougars (Pac-9 Conference) (1984–1985)
1984	Taft	10–1	7–1	T–1st	W Potato Bowl
1985	Taft	7–2–1	6–1–1	2nd	L Potato Bowl
Taft Cougars (Central Valley Conference) (1986–1987)
1986	Taft	7–3	5–0	1st	W Potato Bowl
1987	Taft	9–1	5–0	1st	L Pony Bowl
Taft Cougars (Independent) (1988)
1988	Taft	6–1			
Taft Cougars (Coast Valley Conference) (1989)
1989	Taft	9–0–1	5–0	1st	W Potato Bowl
Taft Cougars (Northern California Football League) (1991–1993)
1991	Taft	5–4	3–3	T–3rd	
1992	Taft	6–3	4–2	2nd	
1993	Taft	6–1–2	4–1–1	2nd	
Taft:		139–26–5	76–12–2		
Total:					
National championship Conference title Conference division title or championship game berth
