= Central Conference =

Junior college athletic conference in Southern California

The Central Conference was a junior college athletic conference with member schools located in Central California that operated from 1928 to 1979. The conference formed in 1928 as the Central California Junior College Association (CCJCA) at a meeting at Bakersfield Junior College—now known as Bakersfield College. Eight junior colleges were represented at the meeting: Bakersfield, California Polytechnic School (now known as California Polytechnic State University, San Luis Obispo), Fresno City College, Porterville College, Reedley College, Santa Maria Junior College (now known as Allan Hancock College), Visalia Junior College (now known as College of the Sequoias), and Taft College.

The Central Conference dissolved in 1979.

== Yearly football standings ==
1954 Central California Junior College Association football standings
	Conf.					Overall
Team	W		L		T	W		L		T
Taft +	4	–	1	–	0	7	–	2	–	0
Fresno +	3	–	1	–	0	?	–	?	–	?
Sequoias +	3	–	1	–	0	8	–	2	–	0
Reedley	2	–	3	–	0	7	–	4	–	0
Porterville	1	–	4	–	0	2	–	7	–	0
Coalinga	0	–	3	–	0	?	–	?	–	?
+ – Conference co-champions

1955 Central California Junior College Association football standings
	Conf.					Overall
Team	W		L		T	W		L		T
Taft $	5	–	0	–	0	9	–	1	–	0
Fresno	3	–	1	–	0	6	–	4	–	0
Porterville	3	–	2	–	0	4	–	4	–	1
Sequoias	2	–	3	–	0	4	–	5	–	0
Coalinga	0	–	4	–	0	3	–	6	–	0
Reedley	1	–	4	–	0	2	–	8	–	0
$ – Conference champion

1956 Central California Junior College Association football standings
	Conf.					Overall
Team	W		L		T	W		L		T
Coalinga $	5	–	0	–	1	7	–	1	–	2
Taft	5	–	1	–	0	5	–	3	–	0
Fresno	3	–	1	–	1	5	–	3	–	1
Porterville	3	–	3	–	0	5	–	4	–	0
Sequoias	1	–	4	–	0	4	–	5	–	0
Hancock	0	–	3	–	1	1	–	6	–	1
Reedley	0	–	5	–	1	2	–	6	–	1
$ – Conference champion

1957 Central California Junior College Association football standings
	Conf.					Overall
Team	W		L		T	W		L		T
Fresno $	5	–	0	–	1	6	–	2	–	1
Reedley	4	–	2	–	0	6	–	4	–	0
Taft	4	–	2	–	0	4	–	5	–	0
Sequoias	3	–	2	–	1	5	–	3	–	1
Porterville	2	–	4	–	0	4	–	4	–	1
Coalinga	1	–	5	–	0	3	–	6	–	0
Hancock	1	–	5	–	0	3	–	6	–	0
$ – Conference champion

1958 Central California Junior College Association football standings
	Conf.					Overall
Team	W		L		T	W		L		T
Fresno City $	6	–	0	–	0	8	–	2	–	0
Sequoias	4	–	2	–	0	5	–	4	–	0
Taft	4	–	2	–	0	5	–	4	–	0
Porterville	4	–	2	–	0	4	–	5	–	0
Reedley	1	–	4	–	1	2	–	6	–	1
Coalinga	1	–	4	–	1	1	–	7	–	1
Hancock	1	–	5	–	0	2	–	6	–	0
$ – Conference champion

1959 Central California Junior College Association football standings
	Conf.					Overall
Team	W		L		T	W		L		T
Coalinga $	6	–	0	–	0	9	–	1	–	0
Sequoias	4	–	2	–	0	4	–	4	–	0
Taft	2	–	2	–	2	3	–	4	–	2
Fresno City	3	–	3	–	0	3	–	5	–	1
Reedley	2	–	2	–	2	2	–	4	–	2
Hancock	1	–	4	–	1	3	–	5	–	1
Porterville	0	–	5	–	1	0	–	8	–	1
$ – Conference champion

1960 Central California Junior College Association football standings
	Conf.					Overall
Team	W		L		T	W		L		T
Hancock $	6	–	0	–	0	10	–	0	–	0
Fresno City	4	–	2	–	0	8	–	2	–	0
Sequoias	4	–	2	–	0	6	–	3	–	0
Taft	3	–	3	–	0	3	–	5	–	1
Reedley	3	–	3	–	0	3	–	6	–	0
Coalinga	1	–	5	–	0	3	–	6	–	0
Porterville	0	–	6	–	0	0	–	9	–	0
$ – Conference champion

1961 Central California Junior College Association football standings
	Conf.					Overall
Team	W		L		T	W		L		T
Hancock $	6	–	0	–	0	8	–	2	–	0
Sequoias	4	–	2	–	0	7	–	2	–	0
Fresno City	4	–	2	–	0	7	–	3	–	0
Coalinga	4	–	2	–	0	6	–	3	–	0
Reedley	2	–	4	–	0	5	–	4	–	0
Taft	1	–	5	–	0	4	–	5	–	0
Porterville *	0	–	6	–	0	3	–	7	–	0
$ – Conference champion; Portervile forfeited a conference tie with Coalinga and forfeited a conference game to Fresno City.

1962 Central California Junior College Association football standings
	Conf.					Overall
Team	W		L		T	W		L		T
Reedley +	3	–	1	–	0	?	–	?	–	?
Porterville +	3	–	1	–	0	?	–	?	–	?
Hancock	2	–	2	–	0	4	–	5	–	0
Taft	1	–	3	–	0	3	–	6	–	0
Coalinga	1	–	3	–	0	?	–	?	–	?
+ – Conference co-champions

1963 Central California Junior College Association football standings
	Conf.					Overall
Team	W		L		T	W		L		T
Hancock $	4	–	0	–	0	8	–	1	–	0
Taft	3	–	1	–	0	6	–	2	–	1
Reedley	2	–	2	–	0	5	–	3	–	0
Coalinga	1	–	3	–	0	3	–	6	–	0
Porterville	0	–	4	–	0	3	–	5	–	1
$ – Conference champion

1964 Central California Junior College Association football standings
	Conf.					Overall
Team	W		L		T	W		L		T
Coalinga $	5	–	0	–	0	9	–	1	–	0
Reedley	4	–	1	–	0	5	–	4	–	0
Hancock	3	–	2	–	0	4	–	5	–	0
Taft	2	–	3	–	0	4	–	4	–	1
Porterville	1	–	3	–	0	3	–	5	–	0
Merced	0	–	5	–	0	2	–	7	–	0
$ – Conference champion

1965 Central California Junior College Association football standings
	Conf.					Overall
Team	W		L		T	W		L		T
Reedley $	5	–	0	–	0	7	–	3	–	0
Merced	4	–	2	–	0	6	–	3	–	0
Hancock	4	–	2	–	0	5	–	3	–	0
Antelope Valley	3	–	2	–	1	5	–	3	–	1
Coalinga	1	–	3	–	2	2	–	5	–	2
Porterville	1	–	5	–	0	3	–	6	–	0
Cuesta	0	–	4	–	1	0	–	7	–	1
$ – Conference champion

1966 Central Conference football standings
	Conf.					Overall
Team	W		L		T	W		L		T
Coalinga $	6	–	1	–	0	6	–	3	–	0
Merced	5	–	2	–	0	6	–	3	–	0
Reedley	5	–	2	–	0	6	–	3	–	0
Antelope Valley	4	–	3	–	0	5	–	4	–	0
Hancock	4	–	2	–	1	4	–	4	–	1
Porterville	2	–	4	–	1	2	–	6	–	1
Desert	1	–	6	–	0	1	–	8	–	0
Cuesta	0	–	7	–	0	1	–	7	–	1
$ – Conference champion

1967 Central Conference football standings
	Conf.					Overall
Team	W		L		T	W		L		T
Coalinga +	5	–	1	–	0	7	–	2	–	0
Reedley +^	5	–	1	–	0	7	–	3	–	1
Porterville	4	–	2	–	0	5	–	4	–	0
Hancock	3	–	3	–	0	3	–	6	–	0
Merced	2	–	4	–	0	3	–	6	–	0
Cuesta	1	–	5	–	0	3	–	6	–	0
Antelope Valley	1	–	5	–	0	2	–	7	–	0
+ – Conference co-champions; ^ – California state junior college small division playoff participant

1968 Central Conference football standings
	Conf.					Overall
Team	W		L		T	W		L		T
Coalinga $^	5	–	0	–	0	6	–	5	–	0
Merced	3	–	2	–	0	5	–	4	–	0
Reedley	3	–	2	–	0	4	–	4	–	0
Cuesta	2	–	3	–	0	4	–	4	–	0
Hancock	1	–	4	–	0	3	–	6	–	0
Porterville	1	–	4	–	0	1	–	8	–	0
$ – Conference champion; ^ – California state junior college small division playoff participant

1969 Central Conference football standings
	Conf.					Overall
Team	W		L		T	W		L		T
Reedley $^	5	–	0	–	0	9	–	1	–	0
Hancock	4	–	1	–	0	7	–	2	–	0
West Hills	3	–	2	–	0	4	–	5	–	0
Porterville	2	–	3	–	0	2	–	6	–	1
Cuesta	1	–	4	–	0	4	–	5	–	0
Merced	0	–	5	–	0	1	–	8	–	0
$ – Conference champion; ^ – California state junior college small division playoff participant

1970 Central Conference football standings
	Conf.					Overall
Team	W		L		T	W		L		T
Reedley $^	5	–	0	–	0	10	–	1	–	0
Hancock	4	–	1	–	0	6	–	2	–	0
Porterville	3	–	2	–	0	5	–	4	–	0
West Hills	2	–	3	–	0	5	–	4	–	0
Cuesta	1	–	4	–	0	2	–	7	–	0
Merced	0	–	5	–	0	2	–	7	–	0
$ – Conference champion; ^ – California state junior college small division playoff participant

1971 Central Conference football standings
	Conf.					Overall
Team	W		L		T	W		L		T
Reedley $^	5	–	0	–	0	9	–	1	–	2
Hancock	4	–	1	–	0	8	–	2	–	0
Merced	2	–	3	–	0	5	–	5	–	0
West Hills	2	–	3	–	0	3	–	7	–	0
Cuesta	1	–	4	–	0	3	–	6	–	0
Porterville	1	–	4	–	0	2	–	8	–	0
$ – Conference champion; ^ – California state junior college small division playoff participant

1972 Central Conference football standings
	Conf.					Overall
Team	W		L		T	W		L		T
West Hills $^	4	–	1	–	0	7	–	4	–	0
Merced	3	–	2	–	0	6	–	4	–	0
Cuesta	3	–	2	–	0	4	–	5	–	0
Taft	3	–	2	–	0	4	–	6	–	0
Antelope Valley	2	–	3	–	0	5	–	5	–	0
Porterville	0	–	5	–	0	3	–	7	–	0
$ – Conference champion; ^ – California state junior college small division playoff participant

1973 Central Conference football standings
	Conf.					Overall
Team	W		L		T	W		L		T
Antelope Valley $^	5	–	0	–	0	6	–	5	–	0
Merced	3	–	1	–	1	6	–	3	–	1
West Hills	3	–	2	–	0	7	–	2	–	0
Taft	2	–	2	–	1	3	–	5	–	1
Cuesta	1	–	4	–	0	2	–	8	–	0
Porterville	0	–	5	–	0	2	–	8	–	0
$ – Conference champion; ^ – California state junior college small division playoff participant

1974 Central Conference football standings
	Conf.					Overall
Team	W		L		T	W		L		T
Antelope Valley $^	5	–	0	–	0	10	–	1	–	0
Cuesta	4	–	1	–	0	6	–	3	–	0
Porterville	2	–	3	–	0	5	–	5	–	0
West Hills	2	–	3	–	0	4	–	5	–	0
Merced	1	–	4	–	0	3	–	7	–	0
Taft	1	–	4	–	0	1	–	8	–	0
$ – Conference champion; ^ – California state junior college Division III playoff participant

1975 Central Conference football standings
	Conf.					Overall
Team	W		L		T	W		L		T
Antelope Valley $^	5	–	0	–	0	9	–	1	–	1
Porterville	3	–	2	–	0	7	–	3	–	0
West Hills	3	–	2	–	0	6	–	4	–	0
Merced	3	–	2	–	0	4	–	6	–	0
Taft	1	–	4	–	0	1	–	8	–	0
Cuesta	0	–	5	–	0	3	–	6	–	0
$ – Conference champion; ^ – California state junior college small division playoff participant

1976 Central Conference football standings
	Conf.					Overall
Team	W		L		T	W		L		T
Taft $	4	–	1	–	0	10	–	1	–	0
Antelope Valley	3	–	2	–	0	6	–	4	–	0
West Hills	3	–	2	–	0	4	–	5	–	0
Cuesta	2	–	3	–	0	7	–	3	–	0
Porterville	2	–	3	–	0	4	–	6	–	0
Merced	1	–	4	–	0	4	–	6	–	0
$ – Conference champion

1977 Central Conference football standings
	Conf.					Overall
Team	W		L		T	W		L		T
Taft $^	5	–	0	–	0	11	–	0	–	0
Porterville	3	–	2	–	0	6	–	3	–	0
Antelope Valley	3	–	2	–	0	6	–	4	–	0
West Hills	3	–	2	–	0	6	–	4	–	0
Merced	1	–	4	–	0	3	–	7	–	0
Cuesta	0	–	5	–	0	2	–	7	–	0
$ – Conference champion; ^ – California state junior college Division II playoff participant

1978 Central Conference football standings
	Conf.					Overall
Team	W		L		T	W		L		T
Merced $^	4	–	0	–	0	11	–	1	–	0
Taft	3	–	1	–	0	6	–	3	–	0
Antelope Valley	2	–	2	–	0	?	–	?	–	?
Porterville	1	–	3	–	0	?	–	?	–	?
West Hills	0	–	4	–	0	?	–	?	–	?
$ – Conference champion; ^ – California state junior college Division II playoff participant

1979 Central Conference football standings
	Conf.					Overall
Team	W		L		T	W		L		T
Taft $^	4	–	0	–	0	10	–	2	–	0
Merced	3	–	1	–	0	7	–	2	–	0
Porterville	1	–	3	–	0	5	–	5	–	0
West Hills	1	–	3	–	0	5	–	5	–	0
Antelope Valley	1	–	3	–	0	3	–	5	–	0
$ – Conference champion; ^ – California state junior college Division II playoff participant
