= Central California =

Coordinates: 37°N 120°W

- Region of California
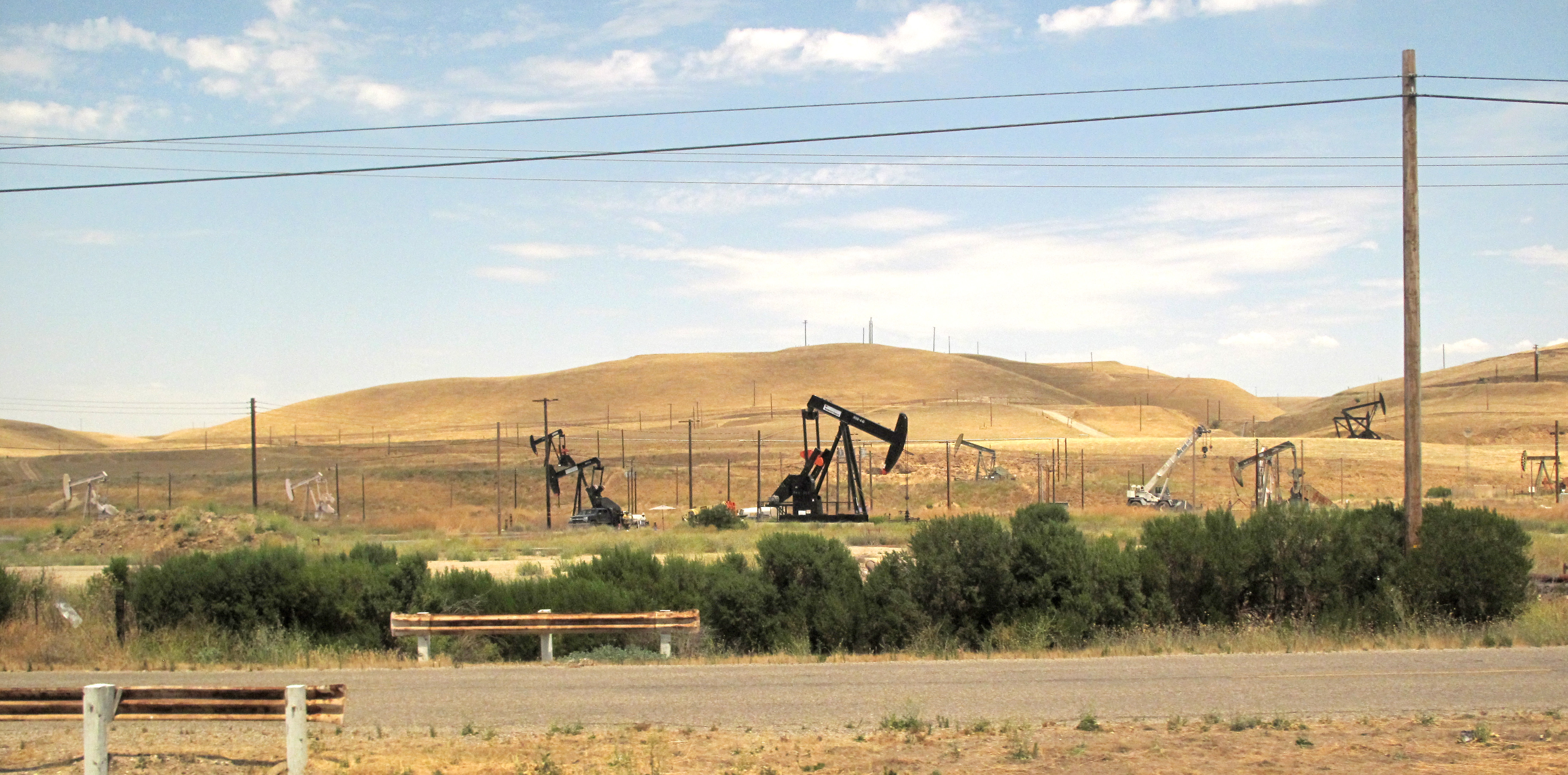
- San Joaquin Valley, California

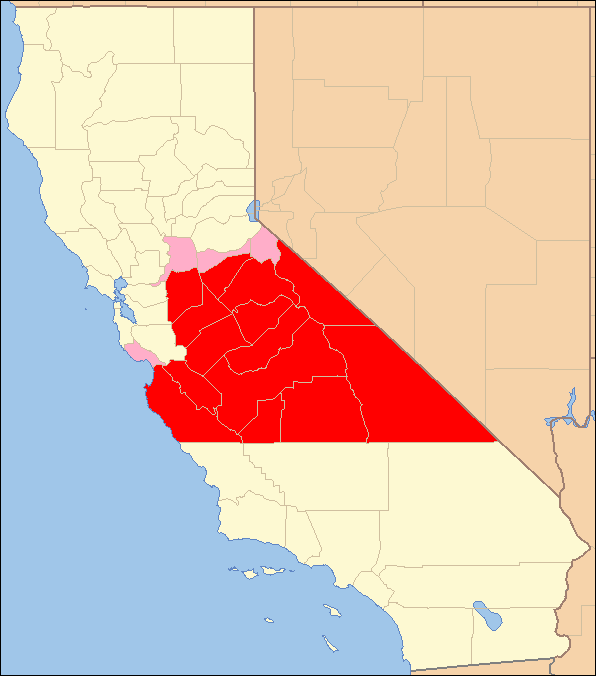
- Map of counties that heavily overlap Central California in red, less accepted counties in pink
- Country: United States
- State: California
- Region: Central California
- Highest elevation: 14,505 ft (4,421 m)
- Lowest elevation: −13 ft (−4.0 m)
- Time zone: Pacific Standard Time
  - Summer (DST): Pacific Daylight Time
- Area codes: 209, 559, 661, 805, 831, 916

Central California is generally thought of as the middle third of the U.S. state of California, north of Southern California (which includes Los Angeles and San Diego) and south of Northern California (which includes San Francisco and San Jose). It includes the northern portion of the San Joaquin Valley (which itself is the southern portion of the Central Valley, beginning at the Sacramento–San Joaquin River Delta), part of the Central Coast, the central hills of the California Coast Ranges and the foothills and mountain areas of the central Sierra Nevada.

Central California is considered to be west of the crest of the Sierra Nevada. East of the Sierra is Eastern California. The largest cities in the region (over 50,000 population), from most to least populous, are Sacramento, Fresno, Stockton, Modesto, Elk Grove, Salinas, Visalia, Clovis, Tracy, Merced, Manteca, Turlock, Tulare, Madera, Lodi, Porterville, Santa Cruz, Hanford, and Delano. Over time, droughts and wildfires have increased in frequency and become less seasonal and more year-round, further straining the region's water security.

== Geography ==
Central California can have widely varying definitions depending on the context. Some divide the state by lines of latitude making northern, central and southern sections. Others divide by county lines or watershed boundaries. Some definitions include more of the San Joaquin Valley and even larger portions of the Central Valley. Some have less or none of Central Coast.

=== Latitudes ===
Central California being in the middle of the state starts at 36 parallel north (exact dividing line of Central and Southern California) and ending around 38°30 parallel north (Sacramento County)

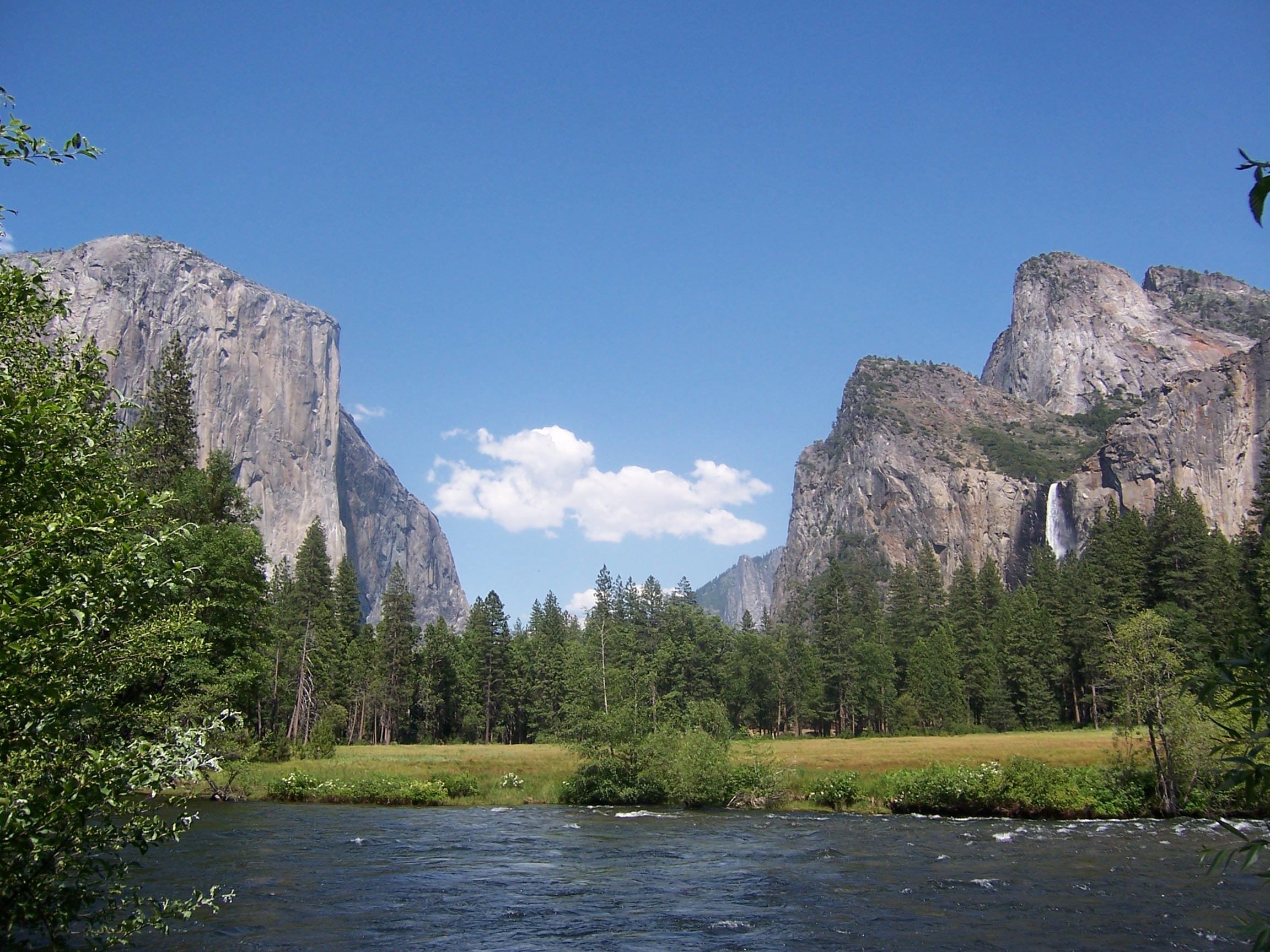
Merced River from Yosemite

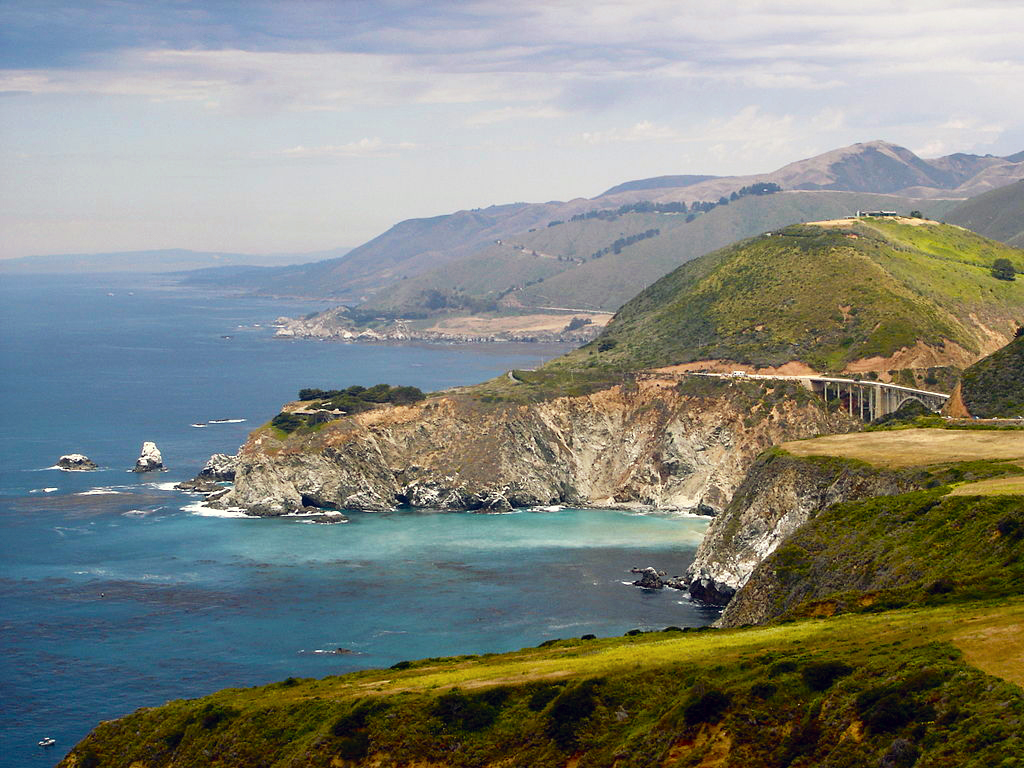
Big Sur

=== Counties ===
The rough definition of Central California includes some or all of the following counties:

- Fresno
- Kings
- Madera
- Mariposa
- Merced
- Monterey
- San Benito
- San Luis Obispo
- Stanislaus
- Tulare
- Tuolumne
- Calaveras
- San Joaquin
- Amador
- Inyo
- Mono

Counties that are occasionally considered Central California:

- Sacramento
- Amador
- Alpine
- Santa Cruz
- Kern
- San Luis Obispo

=== Cities ===
Area cities and towns listed below are major regional centers or county seats.

- Galt
- Clay
- Delano
- Fresno
- Hanford
- Hollister
- Lemoore
- Lodi
- Lompoc
- Madera
- Mariposa
- Merced
- Modesto
- Monterey
- Pismo Beach
- Paso Robles
- Porterville
- Salinas
- Santa Cruz
- Santa Maria
- Selma
- Sonora
- Stockton
- Riverbank
- Tulare
- Turlock
- Visalia
- Watsonville

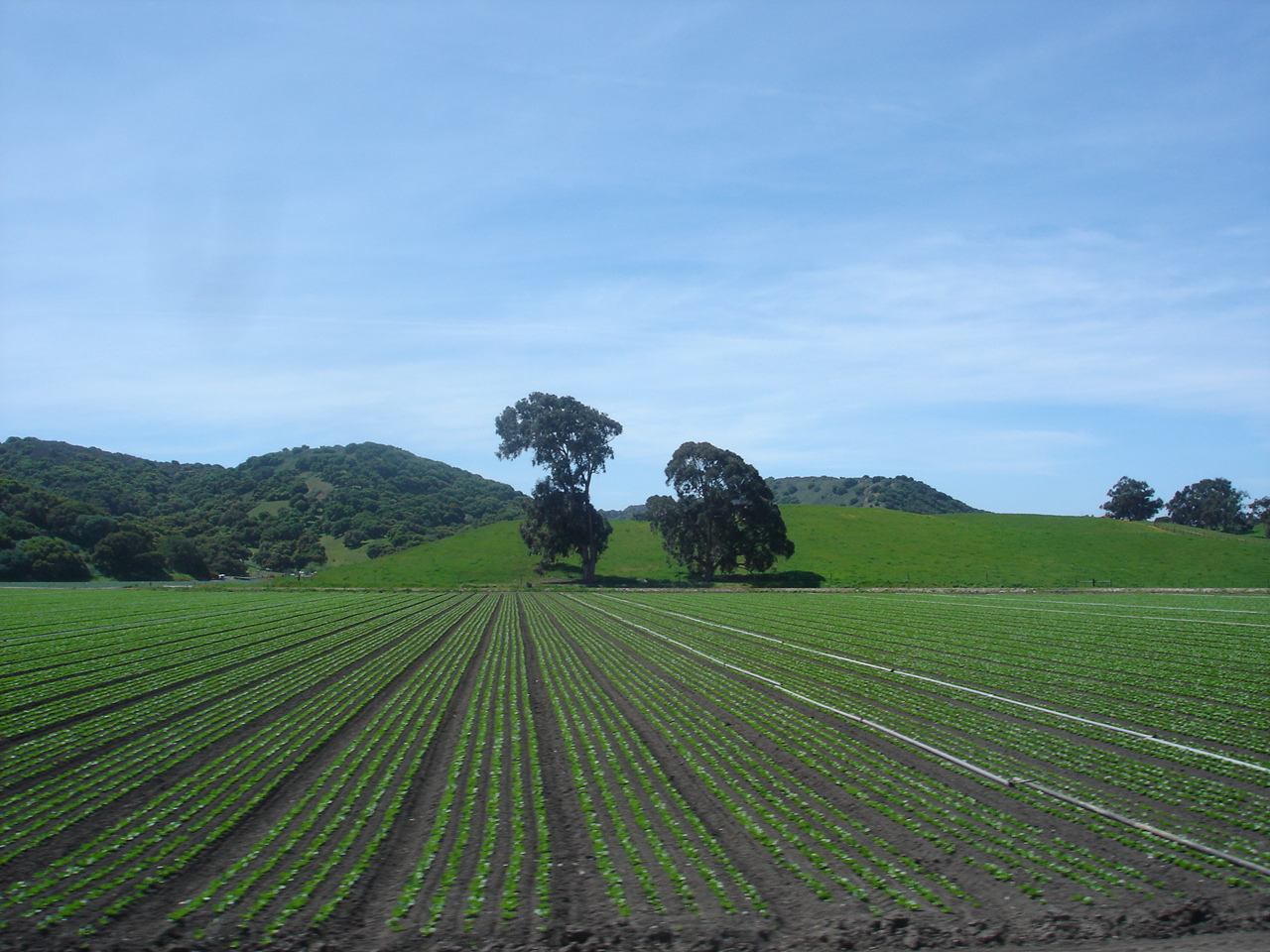
Salinas Valley

=== Sub-regions ===
The following regions are entirely contained within central California:

- Big Sur
- Kings Canyon National Park
- Metropolitan Fresno
- Monterey Bay
- Pinnacles National Park
- Salinas Valley
- San Joaquin Valley
- Sequoia National Park
- Yosemite National Park

The following regions are partially contained within central California:

- California Coast Ranges
- Central Coast
- Diablo Range
- Gold Country
- Kern County
- Santa Cruz County
- Sierra Nevada Mountains
- Tehachapi Mountains

== Education ==
Central California has opened two new universities recently, one in each of the past two decades.

The University of California has one campus in the region. University of California, Merced opened on a newly constructed site on the east side of Merced in 2005.

The California State University system has four campuses in the region. California State University, Monterey Bay opened on the site of the former Fort Ord army base in 1994. California State University, Stanislaus in Turlock opened in 1957. California State University, Fresno opened in 1911.

The Monterey Institute of International Studies is a graduate school that offers eleven master's degree programs in international policy, international management, language teaching, and translation and interpretation. The Monterey Institute of International Studies is a graduate school of Middlebury College.

San Joaquin College of Law is a private, nonprofit law school located in Clovis.

Fresno Pacific University is a private university in Fresno.

The Naval Postgraduate School and Defense Language Institute are located in Monterey.

The following community college campus sites are in the region:

- Columbia College in Sonora, Tuolumne County
- Clovis Community College in Clovis, Fresno County
- Fresno City College in Fresno, Fresno County
- Hartnell College in Salinas, Monterey County
- Merced College in Merced, Merced County
- Modesto Junior College in Modesto, Stanislaus County
- Monterey Peninsula College, Monterey, Monterey County
- Porterville College in Porterville, Tulare County
- Reedley College in Fresno, Fresno County
- College of the Sequoias in Visalia, Tulare County
- West Hills College Coalinga in Coalinga, Fresno County
- West Hills College Lemoore in Lemoore, Kings County
- Madera Community College in Madera, Madera County
- Oakhurst Community College Center in Oakhurst, Madera County

There are no community colleges in Mariposa or San Benito Counties.

== Transport ==
=== Major highways ===
Most of the major highways in the region run north-south around the mountains. Interstate 5 and State Route 99 are the primary highways in the San Joaquin Valley. US 101 and State Route 1 are the major coastal highways.

- State Route 1: Central Coast, Monterey, Big Sur
- Interstate 5: San Joaquin Valley
- State Route 25: Hollister, Diablo Range, Pinnacles Nat'l Park
- State Route 33: San Joaquin Valley
- State Route 41: San Joaquin Valley, Fresno, Yosemite Nat'l Park
- State Route 43: San Joaquin Valley
- State Route 49: Gold Country
- State Route 63: San Joaquin Valley, Visalia
- State Route 65: San Joaquin Valley
- State Route 68: Monterey, Salinas
- State Route 99: San Joaquin Valley, Merced, Madera, Fresno, Bakersfield
- U.S. Route 101: Salinas Valley, Salinas
- State Route 108: San Joaquin Valley, Modesto, Gold Country, Sonora, Sierra Nevada
- State Route 120: San Joaquin Valley, Gold Country, Sierra Nevada, Yosemite Nat'l Park
- State Route 132: San Joaquin Valley, Modesto, Gold Country
- State Route 137: San Joaquin Valley
- State Route 140: San Joaquin Valley, Merced, Yosemite Nat'l Park
- State Route 145: San Joaquin Valley, Madera
- State Route 146: Pinnacles Nat'l Park
- State Route 152: San Joaquin Valley
- State Route 156: Salinas Valley, Salinas, Hollister
- State Route 168: Fresno, Sierra Nevada
- State Route 180: San Joaquin Valley, Fresno, Kings Canyon Nat'l Park
- State Route 190: San Joaquin Valley, Sierra Nevada
- State Route 198: Diablo Range, San Joaquin Valley, Hanford, Visalia, Sequoia Nat'l Park
- State Route 201: San Joaquin Valley
- State Route 233: Chowchilla
- State Route 245: San Joaquin Valley, Kings Canyon Nat'l Park

=== Rail ===
Passenger rail in the region consists of the Amtrak long-haul Coast Starlight and the regional Gold Runner routes.

The California High-Speed Rail system is under construction between Merced and Bakersfield. In Central California, the system will have stations in Merced, Madera, Fresno, and the Kings–Tulare area. Planning is underway to extend the initial line to San Francisco/San Jose and Los Angeles.

Freight rail is served by commercial railroads. Union Pacific Railroad and BNSF Railway operate mainline freight through the region in the Central Valley.

=== Air ===
Major and regional airline services are available at Fresno Yosemite International Airport and Monterey Regional Airport. Regional airline service is also available at Merced Regional Airport.

General Aviation airports exist in all ten counties. The largest are former military bases converted to civilian airports:

- Castle Airport in Merced County
- Marina Municipal Airport in Monterey County
- Porterville Municipal Airport in Tulare County
- Salinas Municipal Airport in Monterey County
- Visalia Municipal Airport in Tulare County

An active military air base is at Naval Air Station Lemoore in Kings County, and the 144th Fighter Wing is stationed at Fresno Air National Guard Base in Fresno County.

== Notes ==
Variations on significant/influential definitions of the term central California are collected in this section.

The following counties are self-described as being in central California or central within California:

- Fresno County
  - Fresno County's intro paragraph on its web site says it is in central California.
- Madera County
  - Madera County describes itself as located "in the exact center of California."
  - Madera County Economic Development Commission describes the county as "located in the geographical center of California".
- Tulare County
  - Tulare County describes itself as "centrally located within the State of California".

The following are definitions by influential organizations:

- The National Register of Historic Places splits California three ways with lines across the map, with central California being approximately above Los Angeles County and below Santa Clara and Merced Counties.
- The California Department of Transportation, or CalTrans, has a wide definition of the central portion of the state with several multi-county districts which have "central" in the name, combining the Central Coast and Central Valley. The North Central district covers Sacramento to Chico. The Central district covers Stockton to Merced, and Yosemite. The South Central district covers Madera, Fresno, and Bakersfield. The Central Coast district covers Santa Cruz to Monterey.
- The Central California chapter of the Better Business Bureau defines their central California region to exclude the coastal counties and include Mono, Inyo and Kern Counties. Their definition is Fresno County, Inyo County, Kern County, Kings County, Madera County, Mariposa County, Merced County, Mono County, and Tulare County.
