= Coast Valley Conference =

Junior college athletic conference in Northern California

The Coast Valley Conference (CVC), sometimes written as Coast-Valley Conference, was a junior college athletic conference with member schools located in Central California. The conference was formed late 1987 and began operation in the fall of 1988. The Coast Valley Conference's seven initial members were Allan Hancock College, the College of the Sequoias, Columbia College of Sonora, Fresno City College, Kings River Community College—now known as Reedley College, Porterville College, and West Hills College Coalinga—now known as Coalinga College. In the spring of 1988, Dave Adams, athletic director at the College of the Sequoias, was appointed president of the Coast Valley Conference. Don Wilson of Santa Maria, California was named the league's commissioner. Taft College joined the conference in 1989.

== Yearly football standings ==
1988 Coast Valley Conference football standings
	Conf.					Overall
Team	W		L		T	W		L		T
Fresno City $	5	–	0	–	0	8	–	3	–	0
Sequoias	4	–	1	–	0	10	–	1	–	0
Hancock	3	–	2	–	0	6	–	4	–	0
Kings River	2	–	3	–	0	2	–	8	–	0
West Hills	1	–	4	–	0	1	–	9	–	0
Porterville	0	–	5	–	0	0	–	10	–	0
$ – Conference champion

1989 Coast Valley Conference football standings
	Conf.					Overall
Team	W		L		T	W		L		T
Taft $	5	–	0	–	0	9	–	0	–	1
Sequoias	4	–	1	–	0	9	–	2	–	0
Fresno City	3	–	2	–	0	6	–	5	–	0
Hancock	2	–	3	–	0	2	–	7	–	0
Porterville	1	–	4	–	0	1	–	9	–	0
West Hills	0	–	5	–	0	1	–	9	–	0
$ – Conference champion
