= Valley Conference =

Junior college athletic conference in Central California

The Valley Conference was a junior college athletic conference with member schools located in Central Valley in Central California. The conference was formed in 1961 and began operation in the fall of 1962. The Valley Conference's six initial members were American River College, the College of the Sequoias, Fresno City College, Modesto Junior College, Sacramento City College, Stockton College—which was renamed as San Joaquin Delta College in 1963. The conference's first commission was Paul Starr, who elected to the post in early 1962.

Modesto, Stockton, and Sacramento had been members of the Big Eight Conference, which folded in 1962. American River had been a member of the Golden Valley Conference.

== Yearly football standings ==
1962 Valley Conference football standings
| | Conf. | | | | | Overall |
| Team | W | | L | | T | W | | L | | T |
|---|---|---|---|---|---|---|---|---|---|---|
| Sacramento City $ | 4 | – | 1 | – | 0 | 8 | – | 2 | – | 0 |
| Modesto | 3 | – | 2 | – | 0 | 6 | – | 3 | – | 0 |
| Stockton | 3 | – | 2 | – | 0 | 6 | – | 3 | – | 0 |
| Sequoias | 2 | – | 2 | – | 1 | 6 | – | 2 | – | 1 |
| Fresno City | 1 | – | 3 | – | 1 | 3 | – | 5 | – | 1 |
| American River | 1 | – | 4 | – | 0 | 3 | – | 6 | – | 0 |
$ – Conference champion

1963 Valley Conference football standings
| | Conf. | | | | | Overall |
| Team | W | | L | | T | W | | L | | T |
|---|---|---|---|---|---|---|---|---|---|---|
| Sequoias $ | 5 | – | 0 | – | 0 | 8 | – | 1 | – | 0 |
| Fresno City | 3 | – | 2 | – | 0 | 4 | – | 5 | – | 0 |
| Sacramento City | 3 | – | 2 | – | 0 | 4 | – | 5 | – | 0 |
| American River | 1 | – | 3 | – | 1 | 3 | – | 5 | – | 1 |
| Modesto | 1 | – | 3 | – | 1 | 2 | – | 5 | – | 2 |
| San Joaquin Delta | 1 | – | 4 | – | 0 | 1 | – | 7 | – | 1 |
$ – Conference champion

1964 Valley Conference football standings
| | Conf. | | | | | Overall |
| Team | W | | L | | T | W | | L | | T |
|---|---|---|---|---|---|---|---|---|---|---|
| Fresno City + | 4 | – | 1 | – | 0 | 8 | – | 2 | – | 0 |
| Sacramento City + | 4 | – | 1 | – | 0 | 6 | – | 2 | – | 1 |
| American River | 3 | – | 2 | – | 0 | 7 | – | 2 | – | 0 |
| Sequoias | 3 | – | 2 | – | 0 | 6 | – | 2 | – | 1 |
| San Joaquin Delta | 1 | – | 4 | – | 0 | 5 | – | 4 | – | 0 |
| Modesto | 0 | – | 5 | – | 0 | 0 | – | 7 | – | 1 |
+ – Conference co-champions

1965 Valley Conference football standings
| | Conf. | | | | | Overall |
| Team | W | | L | | T | W | | L | | T |
|---|---|---|---|---|---|---|---|---|---|---|
| Sequoias $ | 4 | – | 0 | – | 1 | 7 | – | 2 | – | 1 |
| Fresno City | 3 | – | 2 | – | 0 | 6 | – | 3 | – | 0 |
| San Joaquin Delta | 3 | – | 2 | – | 0 | 6 | – | 3 | – | 0 |
| Sacramento City | 2 | – | 3 | – | 0 | 6 | – | 3 | – | 0 |
| American River | 1 | – | 3 | – | 1 | 4 | – | 4 | – | 1 |
| Modesto | 1 | – | 4 | – | 0 | 4 | – | 5 | – | 0 |
$ – Conference champion

1966 Valley Conference football standings
| | Conf. | | | | | Overall |
| Team | W | | L | | T | W | | L | | T |
|---|---|---|---|---|---|---|---|---|---|---|
| Fresno City $ | 5 | – | 0 | – | 0 | 8 | – | 2 | – | 0 |
| American River | 4 | – | 1 | – | 0 | 6 | – | 3 | – | 0 |
| Sequoias | 2 | – | 3 | – | 0 | 6 | – | 3 | – | 0 |
| Sacramento City | 2 | – | 3 | – | 0 | 5 | – | 4 | – | 0 |
| San Joaquin Delta | 2 | – | 3 | – | 0 | 2 | – | 7 | – | 0 |
| Modesto | 0 | – | 5 | – | 0 | 2 | – | 7 | – | 0 |
$ – Conference champion

1967 Valley Conference football standings
| | Conf. | | | | | Overall |
| Team | W | | L | | T | W | | L | | T |
|---|---|---|---|---|---|---|---|---|---|---|
| American River $^ | 5 | – | 0 | – | 0 | 11 | – | 1 | – | 0 |
| Sequoias | 4 | – | 1 | – | 0 | 6 | – | 1 | – | 1 |
| Fresno City | 2 | – | 2 | – | 1 | 4 | – | 4 | – | 1 |
| Sacramento City | 2 | – | 3 | – | 0 | 5 | – | 2 | – | 1 |
| San Joaquin Delta | 1 | – | 4 | – | 0 | 3 | – | 5 | – | 0 |
| Modesto | 0 | – | 4 | – | 1 | 1 | – | 7 | – | 1 |
$ – Conference champion; ^ – California state junior college large division playoff participant

1968 Valley Conference football standings
| | Conf. | | | | | Overall |
| Team | W | | L | | T | W | | L | | T |
|---|---|---|---|---|---|---|---|---|---|---|
| Fresno City $^ | 5 | – | 0 | – | 0 | 10 | – | 2 | – | 0 |
| Sequoias | 4 | – | 1 | – | 0 | 7 | – | 2 | – | 0 |
| Sacramento City | 3 | – | 2 | – | 0 | 7 | – | 2 | – | 0 |
| San Joaquin Delta | 1 | – | 3 | – | 1 | 3 | – | 5 | – | 1 |
| American River | 1 | – | 4 | – | 0 | 2 | – | 7 | – | 0 |
| Modesto | 0 | – | 4 | – | 1 | 0 | – | 8 | – | 1 |
$ – Conference champion; ^ – California state junior college large division playoff participant

1969 Valley Conference football standings
| | Conf. | | | | | Overall |
| Team | W | | L | | T | W | | L | | T |
|---|---|---|---|---|---|---|---|---|---|---|
| Fresno City $^ | 5 | – | 0 | – | 0 | 9 | – | 3 | – | 0 |
| American River | 4 | – | 1 | – | 0 | 7 | – | 2 | – | 0 |
| Sacramento City | 2 | – | 2 | – | 1 | 4 | – | 4 | – | 1 |
| Modesto | 1 | – | 3 | – | 1 | 4 | – | 4 | – | 1 |
| Sequoias | 1 | – | 4 | – | 0 | 4 | – | 5 | – | 0 |
| San Joaquin Delta | 1 | – | 4 | – | 0 | 2 | – | 7 | – | 0 |
$ – Conference champion; ^ – California state junior college large division playoff participant

1970 Valley Conference football standings
| | Conf. | | | | | Overall |
| Team | W | | L | | T | W | | L | | T |
|---|---|---|---|---|---|---|---|---|---|---|
| Sequoias $^ | 4 | – | 1 | – | 0 | 10 | – | 2 | – | 0 |
| Fresno City | 3 | – | 2 | – | 0 | ? | – | ? | – | ? |
| American River | 3 | – | 2 | – | 0 | ? | – | ? | – | ? |
| Sacramento City | 3 | – | 2 | – | 0 | ? | – | ? | – | ? |
| Modesto | 2 | – | 3 | – | 0 | ? | – | ? | – | ? |
| San Joaquin Delta | 0 | – | 5 | – | 0 | ? | – | ? | – | ? |
$ – Conference champion; ^ – California state junior college large division playoff participant

1971 Valley Conference football standings
| | Conf. | | | | | Overall |
| Team | W | | L | | T | W | | L | | T |
|---|---|---|---|---|---|---|---|---|---|---|
| San Joaquin Delta $^ | 4 | – | 0 | – | 1 | 8 | – | 2 | – | 1 |
| Sequoias | 4 | – | 1 | – | 0 | 8 | – | 1 | – | 1 |
| Fresno City | 3 | – | 1 | – | 1 | 3 | – | 4 | – | 1 |
| Modesto | 2 | – | 3 | – | 0 | 2 | – | 6 | – | 1 |
| American River | 1 | – | 4 | – | 0 | 4 | – | 5 | – | 0 |
| Sacramento City | 0 | – | 5 | – | 0 | 1 | – | 8 | – | 0 |
$ – Conference champion; ^ – California state junior college large division playoff participant

1972 Valley Conference football standings
| | Conf. | | | | | Overall |
| Team | W | | L | | T | W | | L | | T |
|---|---|---|---|---|---|---|---|---|---|---|
| Fresno City $^ | 6 | – | 0 | – | 1 | 11 | – | 1 | – | 1 |
| Reedley | 5 | – | 2 | – | 0 | 8 | – | 2 | – | 0 |
| Modesto | 5 | – | 2 | – | 0 | 7 | – | 3 | – | 0 |
| San Joaquin Delta | 4 | – | 3 | – | 0 | 5 | – | 5 | – | 0 |
| Cosumnes River | 3 | – | 4 | – | 0 | 4 | – | 5 | – | 0 |
| American River | 2 | – | 4 | – | 1 | 3 | – | 6 | – | 1 |
| Sequoias | 2 | – | 5 | – | 0 | 2 | – | 8 | – | 0 |
| Sacramento City | 0 | – | 7 | – | 0 | 1 | – | 9 | – | 0 |
$ – Conference champion; ^ – California state junior college large division playoff participant

1973 Valley Conference football standings
| | Conf. | | | | | Overall |
| Team | W | | L | | T | W | | L | | T |
|---|---|---|---|---|---|---|---|---|---|---|
| Fresno City $^ | 7 | – | 0 | – | 0 | 11 | – | 1 | – | 1 |
| Reedley | 6 | – | 1 | – | 0 | 9 | – | 1 | – | 0 |
| Sequoias | 4 | – | 2 | – | 1 | 5 | – | 4 | – | 1 |
| San Joaquin Delta | 4 | – | 3 | – | 0 | 6 | – | 3 | – | 0 |
| Modesto | 3 | – | 3 | – | 1 | 5 | – | 4 | – | 1 |
| Cosumnes River | 2 | – | 5 | – | 0 | 4 | – | 6 | – | 0 |
| Sacramento City | 1 | – | 6 | – | 0 | 4 | – | 6 | – | 0 |
| American River | 0 | – | 7 | – | 0 | 1 | – | 9 | – | 0 |
$ – Conference champion; ^ – California state junior college large division playoff participant

1974 Valley Conference football standings
| | Conf. | | | | | Overall |
| Team | W | | L | | T | W | | L | | T |
|---|---|---|---|---|---|---|---|---|---|---|
| Sequoias $^ | 6 | – | 1 | – | 0 | 9 | – | 2 | – | 0 |
| Modesto | 5 | – | 2 | – | 0 | 7 | – | 3 | – | 0 |
| Fresno City | 5 | – | 2 | – | 0 | 6 | – | 4 | – | 0 |
| Reedley | 4 | – | 3 | – | 0 | 6 | – | 4 | – | 0 |
| San Joaquin Delta | 4 | – | 3 | – | 0 | 6 | – | 4 | – | 0 |
| Cosumnes River | 2 | – | 5 | – | 0 | 3 | – | 6 | – | 1 |
| American River | 2 | – | 5 | – | 0 | 2 | – | 8 | – | 0 |
| Sacramento City | 0 | – | 7 | – | 0 | 0 | – | 10 | – | 0 |
$ – Conference champion; ^ – California state junior college Division I playoff participant

1975 Valley Conference football standings
| | Conf. | | | | | Overall |
| Team | W | | L | | T | W | | L | | T |
|---|---|---|---|---|---|---|---|---|---|---|
| Fresno City $ | 7 | – | 0 | – | 0 | 9 | – | 2 | – | 0 |
| Modesto | 5 | – | 2 | – | 0 | 7 | – | 3 | – | 0 |
| San Joaquin Delta | 5 | – | 2 | – | 0 | 7 | – | 3 | – | 0 |
| Sequoias | 5 | – | 2 | – | 0 | 5 | – | 5 | – | 0 |
| Sacramento City | 3 | – | 4 | – | 0 | 4 | – | 6 | – | 0 |
| Cosumnes River | 1 | – | 6 | – | 0 | 4 | – | 6 | – | 0 |
| Reedley | 1 | – | 6 | – | 0 | 3 | – | 7 | – | 0 |
| American River | 1 | – | 6 | – | 0 | 1 | – | 9 | – | 0 |
$ – Conference champion

1976 Valley Conference football standings
| | Conf. | | | | | Overall |
| Team | W | | L | | T | W | | L | | T |
|---|---|---|---|---|---|---|---|---|---|---|
| Sequoias $ | 7 | – | 0 | – | 0 | 9 | – | 2 | – | 0 |
| Fresno City | 6 | – | 1 | – | 0 | 8 | – | 2 | – | 0 |
| San Joaquin Delta | 5 | – | 2 | – | 0 | ? | – | ? | – | ? |
| Modesto | 3 | – | 3 | – | 1 | ? | – | ? | – | ? |
| Reedley | 3 | – | 4 | – | 0 | ? | – | ? | – | ? |
| Sacramento City | 2 | – | 5 | – | 0 | ? | – | ? | – | ? |
| Cosumnes River | 1 | – | 5 | – | 1 | ? | – | ? | – | ? |
| American River | 0 | – | 7 | – | 0 | 1 | – | 8 | – | 1 |
$ – Conference champion

1977 Valley Conference football standings
| | Conf. | | | | | Overall |
| Team | W | | L | | T | W | | L | | T |
|---|---|---|---|---|---|---|---|---|---|---|
| Modesto + | 6 | – | 1 | – | 0 | 8 | – | 2 | – | 0 |
| Sequoias + | 6 | – | 1 | – | 0 | 8 | – | 3 | – | 0 |
| American River | 5 | – | 2 | – | 0 | 7 | – | 3 | – | 0 |
| Fresno City | 5 | – | 2 | – | 0 | 6 | – | 4 | – | 0 |
| San Joaquin Delta | 3 | – | 4 | – | 0 | 5 | – | 5 | – | 0 |
| Cosumnes River | 1 | – | 5 | – | 0 | 2 | – | 6 | – | 1 |
| Sacramento City | 1 | – | 6 | – | 0 | 2 | – | 8 | – | 0 |
| Reedley | 0 | – | 6 | – | 0 | 1 | – | 8 | – | 0 |
+ – Conference co-champions

1978 Valley Conference football standings
| | Conf. | | | | | Overall |
| Team | W | | L | | T | W | | L | | T |
|---|---|---|---|---|---|---|---|---|---|---|
| Sequoias $ | 5 | – | 1 | – | 0 | 8 | – | 3 | – | 0 |
| American River | 4 | – | 2 | – | 0 | 8 | – | 2 | – | 0 |
| Fresno City | 4 | – | 2 | – | 0 | 5 | – | 5 | – | 0 |
| San Joaquin Delta | 3 | – | 2 | – | 1 | 3 | – | 5 | – | 1 |
| Modesto | 2 | – | 3 | – | 1 | 3 | – | 6 | – | 1 |
| Reedley | 2 | – | 4 | – | 0 | 3 | – | 7 | – | 0 |
| Sacramento City | 0 | – | 6 | – | 0 | 0 | – | 10 | – | 0 |
$ – Conference champion

1979 Valley Conference football standings
| | Conf. | | | | | Overall |
| Team | W | | L | | T | W | | L | | T |
|---|---|---|---|---|---|---|---|---|---|---|
| Sequoias $ | 6 | – | 0 | – | 0 | 8 | – | 3 | – | 0 |
| Modesto | 5 | – | 1 | – | 0 | 6 | – | 4 | – | 0 |
| Fresno City | 4 | – | 2 | – | 0 | 5 | – | 5 | – | 0 |
| American River | 3 | – | 3 | – | 0 | 6 | – | 3 | – | 0 |
| Reedley | 2 | – | 4 | – | 0 | 3 | – | 7 | – | 0 |
| San Joaquin Delta | 1 | – | 5 | – | 0 | 2 | – | 8 | – | 0 |
| Sacramento City | 0 | – | 6 | – | 0 | 0 | – | 9 | – | 0 |
$ – Conference champion

1997 Valley Conference football standings
| | Conf. | | | Overall |
| Team | W | | L | W | | L |
|---|---|---|---|---|---|---|
| Merced + | 4 | – | 1 | 8 | – | 3 |
| Sequoias + | 4 | – | 1 | 6 | – | 5 |
| Kings River | 3 | – | 2 | 3 | – | 7 |
| Modesto | 2 | – | 3 | 6 | – | 5 |
| Fresno City | 2 | – | 3 | 3 | – | 7 |
| West Hills Coalinga | 0 | – | 5 | 1 | – | 9 |
+ – Conference co-champions

1998 Valley Conference football standings
| | Conf. | | | Overall |
| Team | W | | L | W | | L |
|---|---|---|---|---|---|---|
| Sequoias $ | 5 | – | 0 | 9 | – | 1 |
| Modesto | 3 | – | 2 | 4 | – | 6 |
| West Hills Coalinga | 2 | – | 3 | 6 | – | 4 |
| Reedley | 2 | – | 3 | 4 | – | 5 |
| Fresno City | 2 | – | 3 | 4 | – | 6 |
| Merced | 1 | – | 4 | 2 | – | 8 |
$ – Conference champion

1999 Valley Conference football standings
| | Conf. | | | Overall |
| Team | W | | L | W | | L |
|---|---|---|---|---|---|---|
| West Hills Coalinga $ | 5 | – | 0 | 6 | – | 3 |
| Fresno City | 4 | – | 1 | 9 | – | 1 |
| Reedley | 2 | – | 3 | 6 | – | 4 |
| Modesto | 2 | – | 3 | 6 | – | 4 |
| Merced | 1 | – | 4 | 3 | – | 7 |
| Sequoias | 1 | – | 4 | 1 | – | 9 |
$ – Conference champion

2000 Valley Conference football standings
| | Conf. | | | Overall |
| Team | W | | L | W | | L |
|---|---|---|---|---|---|---|
| Fresno City $ | 5 | – | 0 | 10 | – | 1 |
| Reedley | 4 | – | 1 | 7 | – | 4 |
| West Hills Coalinga | 3 | – | 2 | 4 | – | 5 |
| Modesto | 2 | – | 3 | 7 | – | 4 |
| Merced | 1 | – | 4 | 3 | – | 7 |
| Sequoias | 0 | – | 5 | 0 | – | 10 |
$ – Conference champion

2001 Valley Conference football standings
| | Conf. | | | Overall |
| Team | W | | L | W | | L |
|---|---|---|---|---|---|---|
| Fresno City $ | 5 | – | 0 | 10 | – | 0 |
| Modesto | 4 | – | 1 | 8 | – | 2 |
| West Hills Coalinga | 3 | – | 2 | 5 | – | 5 |
| Reedley | 2 | – | 3 | 4 | – | 6 |
| Sequoias | 1 | – | 4 | 2 | – | 8 |
| Merced | 0 | – | 5 | 3 | – | 7 |
$ – Conference champion
