= J. R. Boone =

American football player and coach (1925–2012)

J.R. Boone
- Boone in 1950

No. 57, 55, 24, 22, 43
- Positions: Halfback, return specialist

Personal information
- Born: July 29, 1925; Clinton, Oklahoma, U.S.
- Died: January 21, 2012 (aged 86); Selma, California, U.S.
- Listed height: 5 ft 8 in (1.73 m)
- Listed weight: 162 lb (73 kg)

Career information
- College: Tulsa
- NFL draft: 1948: 22nd round, 203rd overall pick

Career history

Playing
- Chicago Bears (1948–1951); San Francisco 49ers (1952); Green Bay Packers (1953)

Coaching
- Sanger HS (CA) (1959–1965) Head coach; Reedley (1966–1972) Head coach; Fresno State (1973–1975) Head coach

Career NFL statistics
- Rushing yards: 497
- Rushing average: 3.8
- Receptions: 69
- Receiving yards: 1,251
- Total touchdowns: 12
- Stats at Pro Football Reference

J. R. "Junior" Boone (July 29, 1925 – January 21, 2012) was an American professional football player and coach. He played professionally as a halfback and punt returner for six seasons in the National Football League (NFL) with the Chicago Bears, San Francisco 49ers, and Green Bay Packers. Boone was drafted by the Chicago Bears in the 22nd round of the 1948 NFL draft.

After his playing days were over, Boone served as the head football coach at Reedley College and Fresno State University, both located in California.

== Biography ==
Boone was born in Clinton, Oklahoma. on July 29, 1925. The initials of his name stand for nothing. He was a star athlete at the University of Tulsa, earned nine letters and graduating with a degree in physical education and social science. A captain of the Tulsa football team, Boone was also a star athlete in basketball, track, baseball. He was a versatile athlete, he played football as a back, safety, and punt and kick returner. He was also drafted by the New York Yankees baseball organization.

Boone was traded to the San Francisco 49ers in 1952, and then to the Green Bay Packers in 1953. His six-year pro career statistics included 497 rushing yards in 130 carries and five touchdowns in 63 games. He also caught 69 passes for 1,251 yards and eight touchdowns, averaging 18.1 yards per catch), and returned seventy-two punt returns for 725 yards (10.1 average).

In 1972, Boone was inducted into the Fresno County Athletic Hall of Fame. He died in his sleep on January 21, 2012, at his home in Selma, California.

== Head coaching record ==
=== College ===
Year	Team	Overall	Conference	Standing	Bowl/playoffs
Fresno State Bulldogs (Pacific Coast Athletic Association) (1973–1975)
1973	Fresno State	2–9	1–3	4th	
1974	Fresno State	5–7	1–3	T–4th	
1975	Fresno State	3–8	1–4	5th	
Fresno State:		10–24	3–10		
Total:		10–24			

=== Junior college ===
Year	Team	Overall	Conference	Standing	Bowl/playoffs
Reedley Tigers (Central Conference) (1966–1971)
1966	Reedley	6–3	5–2	T–2nd	
1967	Reedley	7–3–1	5–1	T–1st	L California state junior college small division semifinal
1968	Reedley	4–4	3–2	T–2nd	
1969	Reedley	9–1	5–0	1st	L California state junior college small division semifinal
1970	Reedley	10–1	5–0	1st	L California state junior college small division championship game
1971	Reedley	9–1–2	5–0	1st	W California state junior college small division championship game
Reedley Tigers (Valley Conference) (1972)
1972	Reedley	8–2	5–2	T–2nd	
Reedley:		53–15–3	33–7		
Total:		53–15–3			
National championship Conference title Conference division title or championship game berth
