= West Hills College =

"West Hills College" may refer to one of the following:

- West Hills Community College District
- West Hills College Coalinga
- West Hills College Lemoore
