= John Volek =

American football player and coach

Biographical details
- Born: c. 1946

Playing career
- 1965–1966: Sierra
- 1967: Weber State
- 1968: UC Riverside
- Position: Center

Coaching career (HC unless noted)
- 1969–1971: UC Riverside (assistant)
- 1972–1973: Santa Cruz HS (CA)
- 1974: Mt. San Jacinto (assistant)
- 1977–1983: Walla Walla (assistant)
- 1984–1987: Walla Walla
- 1988–1994: Fresno City
- 1995–2002: Sacramento State

Administrative career (AD unless noted)
- 2003–2011: Sierra
- 2017: Sacramento State (interim AD)

Head coaching record
- Overall: 31–57–1 (college); 82–31–1 (junior college)
- Bowls: 2–5 (junior college)

Accomplishments and honors

Championships
- 3 NWAACC (1985–1987); 1 Coast Valley Conference (1988); 1 NCFL (1993); 1 Central Valley Conference (1994); 1 AWC (1995)

John F. Volek (born c. 1946) is an American former college football coach and college athletics administrator. He served as the head football coach at California State University, Sacramento from 1995 to 2002, compiling a record of 31–57–1. Volek was the head football coach at Walla Walla Community College in Walla Walla, Washington from 1984 to 1987, leading his teams to a record of 31–7 and three Northwest Athletic Association of Community Colleges (NWAACC) championships. He was then the head football coach at Fresno City College in Fresno, California from 1988 to 1994, tallying a mark of 51–24–1 in seven seasons and winning three conference titles, in 1988, 1993, and 1994.

Volek graduated from Placer High School in Auburn, California and then played junior college football at Sierra College in Rocklin, California from 1965 to 1966. He transferred to Weber State University, playing center for the Weber State Wildcats in 1967, and then to University of California, Riverside, where he played again at center on the 1968 UC Riverside Highlanders football team. He received a master's degree from the UC Riverside in 1972. Volek was hired as head football coach at Santa Cruz High School in 1972. After two years at Santa Cruz High School, he moved on to Mt. San Jacinto College in San Jacinto, California to become an assistant football coach and teach in the school's new department of recreation leadership.

Volek is the father of Billy Volek, who played quarterback in the National Football League (NFL) from 2000 to 2011.

== Head coaching record ==
=== College ===
Year	Team	Overall	Conference	Standing	Bowl/playoffs
Sacramento State Hornets (American West Conference) (1995)
1995	Sacramento State	4–6–1	3–0	1st	
Sacramento State Hornets (Big Sky Conference) (1996–2002)
1996	Sacramento State	1–10	0–7	8th	
1997	Sacramento State	1–10	1–7	9th	
1998	Sacramento State	5–6	3–5	T–7th	
1999	Sacramento State	6–5	3–5	T–5th	
2000	Sacramento State	7–4	5–3	T–2nd	
2001	Sacramento State	2–9	1–6	T–7th	
2002	Sacramento State	5–7	3–4	T–4th	
Sacramento State:		31–57–1	19–37		
Total:		31–57–1			
National championship Conference title Conference division title or championship game berth

=== Junior college ===
Year	Team	Overall	Conference	Standing	Bowl/playoffs
Walla Walla Warriors (Northwest Athletic Association of Community Colleges) (1984–1987)
1984	Walla Walla	7–2	6–2	2nd	
1981	Walla Walla	8–2	6–2	T–1st	
1986	Walla Walla	9–0	8–0	1st	
1987	Walla Walla	7–3	5–1	1st	L Real Dairy Centennial Bowl
Walla Walla:		31–7	25–5		
Fresno City Rams (Coast Valley Conference) (1988–1989)
1988	Fresno City	8–3	5–0	1st	L Merced Elks Bowl
1989	Fresno City	6–5	3–2	3rd	L Merced Elks Bowl
Fresno City Rams (Northern California Football League) (1990–1993)
1990	Fresno City	8–3	4–2	T–2nd	L Producers Daily Bowl
1991	Fresno City	5–5	2–4	T–5th	
1992	Fresno City	6–4–1	3–2–1	3rd	W Producers Daily Bowl
1993	Fresno City	9–2	5–1	1st	W Producers Daily Bowl
Fresno City Rams (Central Valley Conference) (1994)
1994	Fresno City	9–2	4–0	1st	L Producers Daily Bowl
Fresno City:		51–24–1	26–11–1		
Total:		82–31–1			
National championship Conference title Conference division title or championship game berth
