= Northern California Football League =

Junior college athletic conference in Central and Northern California

The Northern California Football League (NCFL) was a football-only junior college athletic conference with member schools located in the Central Valley, in Central and Northern California. It operated for four seasons, from 1990 to 1993. The league had seven members: American River College, Fresno City College, Merced College, Sacramento City College, Santa Rosa Junior College, College of the Sequoias, and Taft College.

The conference folded at the end of the 1993–94 academic year.

== Yearly standings ==
1990 Northern California Football League standings
	Conf.					Overall
Team	W		L		T	W		L		T
Taft $	6	–	0	–	0	8	–	1	–	0
Sequoias	4	–	2	–	0	9	–	2	–	0
Fresno City	4	–	2	–	0	8	–	3	–	0
Merced	3	–	3	–	0	8	–	3	–	0
Sacramento City	3	–	3	–	0	4	–	5	–	0
American River	1	–	5	–	0	2	–	7	–	0
Santa Rosa	0	–	6	–	0	2	–	8	–	0
$ – Conference champion

1991 Northern California Football League standings
	Conf.					Overall
Team	W		L		T	W		L		T
Sequoias +	5	–	1	–	0	10	–	1	–	0
Sacramento City +	5	–	1	–	0	8	–	2	–	0
American River	3	–	3	–	0	6	–	4	–	0
Taft	3	–	3	–	0	5	–	4	–	0
Fresno City	2	–	4	–	0	5	–	5	–	0
Santa Rosa	2	–	4	–	0	3	–	7	–	0
Merced	1	–	5	–	0	3	–	7	–	0
+ – Conference co-champions

1992 Northern California Football League standings
	Conf.					Overall
Team	W		L		T	W		L		T
Sacramento City $	6	–	0	–	0	10	–	0	–	1
Taft	4	–	2	–	0	6	–	3	–	0
Fresno City	3	–	2	–	1	6	–	4	–	1
Santa Rosa	3	–	3	–	0	4	–	6	–	0
Merced	2	–	4	–	0	3	–	7	–	0
Sequoias	1	–	4	–	1	3	–	6	–	1
American River	1	–	5	–	0	3	–	7	–	0
$ – Conference champion

1993 Northern California Football League standings
	Conf.					Overall
Team	W		L		T	W		L		T
Fresno City $	5	–	1	–	0	9	–	2	–	0
Taft	4	–	1	–	1	6	–	1	–	2
Sacramento City	4	–	2	–	0	8	–	2	–	0
Merced	3	–	2	–	1	6	–	3	–	1
Sequoias	3	–	3	–	0	5	–	5	–	0
Santa Rosa	1	–	5	–	0	1	–	9	–	0
American River	0	–	6	–	0	3	–	7	–	0
$ – Conference champion
