= State Center =

State Center may refer to:

- State Center, Iowa, a city in Marshall County
- Iowa State Center, a cultural and athletic complex in Ames, Iowa
- State Center (Metro Subway station), a station in Baltimore, Maryland
- State Center Community College District, an education district in California

== See also ==
- List of geographic centers of the United States
