= NCFL =

NCFL may refer to:

- National Catholic Forensic League, a speech and debate youth league in the United States, formed in 1951
- North Central Football League, an Australian rules football competition in Victoria.
- Northern California Football League, a football-only junior college athletic conference in California that operated from 1990 to 1993
