= Dick Cohee =

American gridiron football player (1939–2013)

Profile
- Positions: Halfback, End

Personal information
- Born: November 26, 1939; Wichita Falls, Texas, U.S.
- Died: October 13, 2013 (aged 73); Burnaby, British Columbia, Canada
- Listed height: 6 ft 1 in (1.85 m)
- Listed weight: 190 lb (86 kg)

Career history
- 1960–1962: Montreal Alouettes
- 1962: Ottawa Rough Riders
- 1963–1964: Saskatchewan Roughriders
- 1964–1968: Hamilton Tiger-Cats

Awards and highlights
- Grey Cup champion (1965, 1967)

Richard Cohee (November 26, 1939 – October 11, 2013) was a Canadian football player who played for the Hamilton Tiger-Cats, Montreal Alouettes, Ottawa Rough Riders, and Saskatchewan Roughriders. He won the Grey Cup with the Tiger-Cats in 1965 and 1967. He played college football at the Reedley College. Cohee died of cancer in 2013.
