= State Center Community College District =

Coordinates: 36°46′08.1″N 119°47′33.7″W

- Type: Public community college
- Established: 1964; 62 years ago
- Accreditation: Western Association of Schools and Colleges
- Budget: $503.4 million (2023–24)
- Chancellor: Dr. Carole Goldsmith
- Academic staff: 1,981 (2025)
- Administrative staff: 143
- Undergraduates: 70,097 (2024–25)
- Location: 1171 Fulton, Fresno, California, United States
- Campus: 4: Fresno, Reedley, Clovis and Madera
- Website: www.scccd.edu

The State Center Community College District (SCCCD) is a public community college district in Central California and part of the California Community Colleges system. The district serves most of Fresno and Madera counties, along with portions of Kings and Tulare counties, covering approximately 5,743 square miles (14,870 km^{2}) and a population of about 1.7 million. During the 2024–25 academic year, the district enrolled more than 70,000 students.

SCCCD operates four colleges: Fresno City College, with its main campus in central Fresno and a center in west Fresno; Reedley College in Reedley; Clovis Community College, with campuses in north Fresno and Clovis; and Madera Community College, with its main campus in Madera and a center in Oakhurst.
