= West Hills Community College District =

Public community colleges in Coalinga, California, United States

- Motto: Once You Go Here, You Can Go Anywhere
- Established: 1932; 94 years ago
- Chancellor: Dr. Robert Pimentel
- Location: Coalinga, California, United States
- Campus: Coalinga College Lemoore College
- Website: www.westhillscollege.com

West Hills Community College District (WHC) is a public community college district in California serving students in the San Joaquin Valley. Colleges in the district include Coalinga College and Lemoore College. The original campus in Coalinga was established in 1932, and the Lemoore campus was built in 2002. In addition, there is a center at Firebaugh and classes are offered at Lemoore Naval Air Station.

Coalinga College, formerly West Hills College Coalinga is one of the 11 California community colleges that have dormitories.

Lemoore College, formerly West Hills College Lemoore offers a student-centered flexible environment.

Both colleges offer sports programs. Coalinga College offers football, baseball and basketball for men and volleyball and softball for women. A top-ranked rodeo team that competes against two and four year schools is coed. Lemoore College offers soccer, basketball, wrestling and soccer for men and volleyball, basketball, and soccer for women.

Both Coalinga College and Lemoore College are accredited by the Accrediting Commission for Community and Junior Colleges.
