= Holly, Texas =

- Unincorporated community
- Location within Texas Location within the United States
- Coordinates: 31°07′48″N 95°20′14″W
- Country: United States
- State: Texas
- County: Houston
- Elevation: 279 ft (85 m)
- Time zone: UTC-6 (Central (CST))
  - Summer (DST): UTC-5 (CDT)
- Area code: 936
- GNIS feature ID: 1382015

Holly is an unincorporated community in Houston County, Texas, United States. According to the Handbook of Texas, the community had a population of 112 in 2000.

== History ==
Holly had three churches, a steam saw, and a gristmill in the late 1800s. T. H. Phipps served as postmaster from 1886 until 1914 at the Holly post office. The town reported 250 residents in 1890, but by 1892, only 100 people were living there. In addition to two general stores, a saw and grist mill, and a doctor in that year, Holly had a cooperative association. The community's population had fallen to 50 by 1896, and there were no longer any enterprises there. In 1914, Holly had a population of 25, along with a general store and a cotton and grist mill. Holly had a population of 25 in 1948, the latest year for which statistics were available, and the town had several dispersed homes, a shop, and a church. The town had a church and dispersed homes in 1963. The Holly townsite was still visible on the county highway map from 1989. The population was 112 in 2000.

== Geography ==
Holly is located at the junction of Farm to Market Road 1280 and Farm to Market Road 2781, 17 miles (27 km) southeast of Crockett and 6 mi (9.7 km) east of Lovelady in southern Houston County.

== Education ==
Holly had its own school in the late 1800s and in 1948. Today, the community is served by the Lovelady Independent School District.
