= Madera Community College =

Community college in Madera, California, US

- Type: Community college
- Established: July 20, 2020
- Affiliations: State Center Community College District, California Community Colleges
- President: Angel Reyna
- Location: Madera, California, U.S. 36.924240°N 119.997566°W
- Nickname: Mountain Lions
- Website: maderacollege.edu

Madera Community College is a community college in Madera, California, operated by the State Center Community College District. It opened at its current site in 1996 as the Madera Community College Center. It remained a center of Reedley College until 2020, when it became a separate campus of the district and was renamed Madera Community College.

The 2.6-acre (10,522 m^{2}) Oakhurst Community College Center in Oakhurst also opened in 1996. It became the Madera Community College Oakhurst Campus when Madera became a separate college in 2020.

== History ==
In the 1980s, the State Center Community College District identified a need to expand educational and support services in the northern portion of the district and assigned Reedley College responsibility for developing what became known as the North Centers. The first, the Madera Center, was established in 1985, serving about 158 students in its first year. It initially operated on the campus of Madera High School before moving to portable buildings at Madison Elementary School in 1989 and formally took the name Madera County Educational Center.

Following a substantive change proposal approved by the Accrediting Commission for Community and Junior Colleges in 2016, it was renamed Madera Community College Center of Reedley College.

In 1996, the Madera Center moved to its present site south of the city of Madera on 114 acres (46 ha) of donated land. The campus initially consisted of 21 modular classrooms and a single large permanent building housing the dining hall, bookstore and student services. The first year on the new campus saw enrollment of 1,500 students.

As enrollment grew, the district began replacing the temporary facilities with permanent buildings. The first phase of construction included an Administration Building, Student Services Building, Library and academic buildings. The 25,000-square-foot (2,300 m^{2}) Administration Building was completed in August 2000. Academic Village One, the first group of permanent academic buildings, was completed in spring 2004.

In 2006, the district began construction of the Center for Advanced Manufacturing to expand career technical education programs. The Center for Agriculture and Technology opened on the campus in January 2020.

In May 2019, the district appointed Ángel Reyna as the center's founding president as it prepared to become an independent college, having grown enrollment to more than 6,700 in the 2019–20 academic year. The Accrediting Commission for Community and Junior Colleges granted Madera initial accreditation as a stand-alone college in June 2020, and the California Community Colleges Board of Governors approved its establishment as California's 116th community college in July 2020.

== Oakhurst campus ==
Madera Community College's Oakhurst campus originated as a Reedley College satellite center in 1990 to provide educational services to northeastern Madera County. It initially operated at Yosemite High School. In 1996, the Oakhurst Center moved to its current 2.5-acre (1.0 ha) site, where it operated in temporary modular buildings. The center became part of Madera Community College when the latter became an independent college in 2020.

In 2018, the SCCCD approved the purchase of a 30.2-acre (12.2 ha) site on Westlake Drive in Oakhurst for a new permanent campus. Plans for the first phase called for a triangular-shaped building containing four general education classrooms, a shared biology/chemistry lab, a computer lab, library and tutoring space, cafe, and administrative and student support offices. The plans also include a museum to display the center's taxidermy collection.
