= Clovis Community College (California) =

Public college in Fresno, California, US

Coordinates: 36.8870°N 119.7313°W

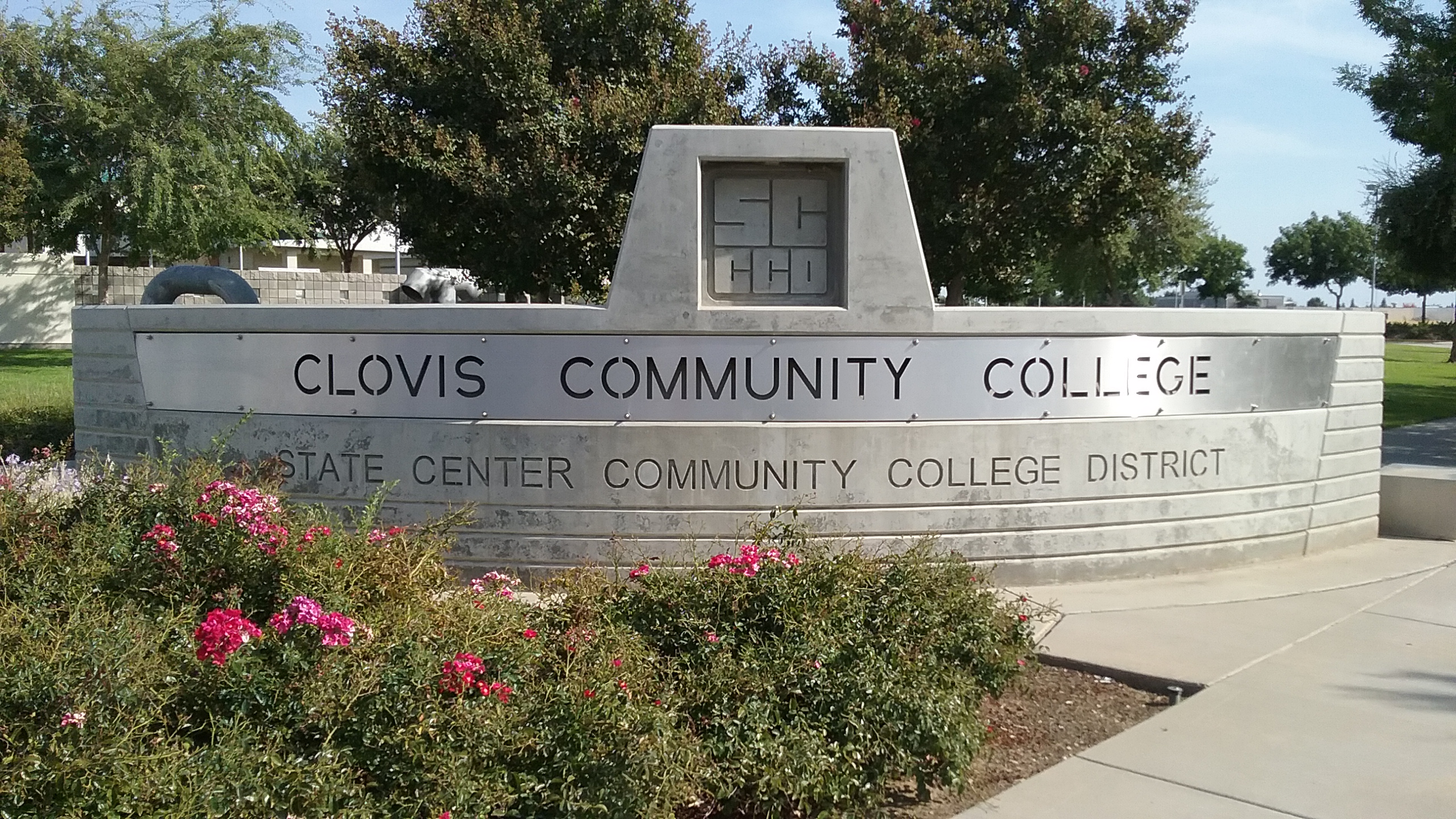
- Front entrance to the parking lot of Clovis Community College (Fresno, California).
- Type: Public community college
- Established: 1992
- Parent institution: State Center Community College District
- President: Kim Armstrong
- Students: 7,755
- Location: Fresno, California, United States
- Campus: 110 acres (45 ha); Urban
- Website: cloviscollege.edu

Clovis Community College is a public community college in northeastern Fresno, California near Clovis. It is in the State Center Community College District (SCCCD). It has a satellite campus on Herndon Avenue in Clovis.

== History ==
In the 1980's the State Center Community College District identified a need to expand educational and support services in the northern portion of the district and assigned Reedley College responsibility for developing what became known as the North Centers. The third, the Clovis Center, was established in 1992 to expand educational services in the rapidly growing communities in northeast Fresno and Clovis. The Clovis Center was established at a property on Herndon Avenue that had previously been operated by a private college.

In response to continued growth in northeast Fresno and Clovis, the district acquired 110 acres (0.45 km^{2}) at the corner of Willow and International avenues in 2003. Construction of the new Willow International Center began with Academic Center One, which opened for classes in 2007. Initially, the building housed classrooms, laboratories, faculty and administrative offices, the library, student services and other campus functions. A Child Development Center also opened in 2007, operated in partnership with the Clovis Unified School District. A temporary food service and bookstore building was added in 2008.

The Academic Center Two building was completed in 2010, adding instructional and support space, including classrooms, science laboratories, student services, offices and a lecture hall.

The Willow International Center subsequently became the primary campus of the college, while the former Herndon site continued to provide additional instructional and administrative space.

The Willow International Center was renamed Clovis Community College Center in 2014. In June 2015, the Accrediting Commission for Community and Junior Colleges granted it college status, and on July 1, 2015, it became a separate college within the State Center Community College District. It became the third accredited college in the district and the 113th community college in California.
