= Lemoore College =

Community college in Lemoore, California, US

- Motto: Flex Your Future
- Type: Public community college
- Established: 2002
- Parent institution: West Hills Community College District
- President: James Preston
- Location: Lemoore, California, U.S. 36.2924°N 119.8239°W
- Colors: Blue and gold
- Mascot: Golden Eagles
- Website: www.westhillscollege.com/lemoore/

Lemoore College, previously West Hills College Lemoore, is a public community college in Lemoore, California. It was built in 2002 and serves students in the San Joaquin Valley. In addition, classes are offered at Lemoore Naval Air Station. Lemoore College is part of West Hills Community College District.

Lemoore College offers soccer, basketball, and wrestling for men and volleyball, basketball, and soccer for women. It is accredited by the Accrediting Commission for Community and Junior Colleges.
