= Porterville College =

Community college in Porterville, California, US

- Type: Public community college
- Established: 1927
- Parent institution: Kern Community College District, California Community Colleges System
- President: Primavera Monarrez
- Location: Porterville, California, United States; 36.048771°N 119.014633°W
- Colors: Red, black and white
- Nickname: Pirates
- Website: www.portervillecollege.edu

Porterville College is a public community college in Porterville, California. It was established in 1927.

== Notable people ==
- Wayne Hardin (1926–2017), College Football Hall of Famer, head football coach at Porterville College from 1953 to 1954
- Ted Bachman (1951–2023), NFL player
- Robert Foster (born 1970), Jamaican hurdler
