= Coalinga College =

Public college in Coalinga, California, US

- Motto: Better Tomorrows Begins Here
- Type: Public community college
- Established: 1932
- Parent institution: West Hills Community College District
- President: Carla Tweed
- Location: Coalinga, California, U.S. 36°08′59″N 120°21′25″W
- Colors: Red and blue
- Mascot: Falcons
- Website: westhillscollege.com/coalinga

Coalinga College, formerly West Hills College Coalinga, is a public community college in Coalinga, California, with a satellite facility in Firebaugh. Both locations serve students in the central San Joaquin Valley. Established in 1932, Coalinga College is in the West Hills Community College District. It is accredited by the Accrediting Commission for Community and Junior Colleges.

== Academics ==
The school is one of only eleven California community colleges with dormitories in California. It attracts students from around the world, and actively recruits students from other countries to enroll in its English as a Second Language program.

== Athletics ==
Coalinga College athletics offers football, baseball, and basketball for men; and volleyball and softball for women. A coed rodeo team competes against two- and four -year colleges and universities.
