= Merced College =

Community college in Merced, California, US

- Merced College Seal
- Former name: Merced Community College
- Type: Community college
- Established: February 27, 1962
- Affiliations: Merced Community College District, California Community Colleges
- President: Chris Vitelli
- Students: 14,775
- Location: Merced, California, United States; 37°20′6″N 120°28′26.76″W
- Colors: Blue and Gold
- Nicknames: Blue Devils (men) and Lady Devils (sometimes She-Devils)
- Website: www.mccd.edu

Merced College is a public community college in Merced, California.

== History ==
In 1961, the Merced High and Le Grand High School Districts petitioned the State Board of Education for permission to set an election to approve the establishment of a junior college district in Merced County. The State Board of Education approved the proposal for the Merced County Junior College on November 10, 1961. The County Superintendent of Schools set February 27, 1962, as the date for the election. Before the election, Robert Clemo, Chief of the Bureau of School District Organization, along with Loren Wann, conducted a survey to determine if Merced County had a sufficient number of students at the time and in the future, if the tax base was high enough to support a community college, and whether a need for a separate junior college (separate from Modesto Junior College) existed. The answer to all three questions was yes. The vote in the election was 3996 in favor and 1494 opposed.

The initial governing board was elected and sworn into office in 1962. It was composed of the following individuals: Buddy Iwata, George Clark, Byron Cunningham, John Hann, and Donald Robinson. Buddy Iwata was the first board chairman, George Clark was the vice-chairman, and Byron Cunningham was the secretary. Merced Union High School District Superintendent Clair Hopkins acted as the interim junior college superintendent as well as continuing his duties as high school superintendent with the permission of the high school board. One of the first orders of business for the new junior college board was to select a name for the college. While many potential names were considered, Merced Junior College was chosen by a unanimous vote of the college board.

== Campuses ==
The college's service district is composed of Merced County, the Chowchilla Union High School District in Madera County, and the Dos Palos Joint Union Elementary School District. A single-college district, the main campus is located in the City of Merced on 269 acres. The new Los Banos Campus, an educational center completed in 2007, is located on 120 acres in the City of Los Banos. Merced College also has classes available at other locations outside of its two main locations for residents in Delhi, Dos Palos, and Mariposa. It has also offered classes for employees of the Valley State Prison for Women and the Central California Women's Facility.

== Notable alumni ==
- Jerry Garvin - MLB pitcher for the Toronto Blue Jays
- Adam Gray - California State Assemblyman, District 21
- Benjamin T. Duran - former Merced College President, President & CEO of the Great Valley Center, Modesto, California
- Michael Gallo - Co-Owner Joseph Gallo Farms
- Marvin Eastman - two-time NJCAA All-American wrestler; Mixed Martial Artist
- Duke Fergerson - former NFL player
- Lavar Johnson - football player; current MMA fighter for Bellator Fighting Championship
- Reuben Droughns - former NFL player
- Bill Mooneyham - former pitcher for the Oakland Athletics

== Notable People ==
- Professor Leonard - Professor of mathematics

== See also ==
- Merced Blue Devils Major League Baseball players
