= Reedley College =

Community college in Reedley, California, US

Coordinates: 36°36′26.0″N 119°27′37.0″W

- Type: Public community college
- Established: 1926
- Parent institution: California Community Colleges system, State Center Community College District
- Chancellor: Paul Parnell
- President: Jerry L. Buckley
- Students: 12,916
- Location: Reedley, California, United States
- Campus: Rural 420 acres (1.7 km^{2})
- Colors: Orange and Black
- Mascot: Tigers
- Website: www.reedleycollege.edu

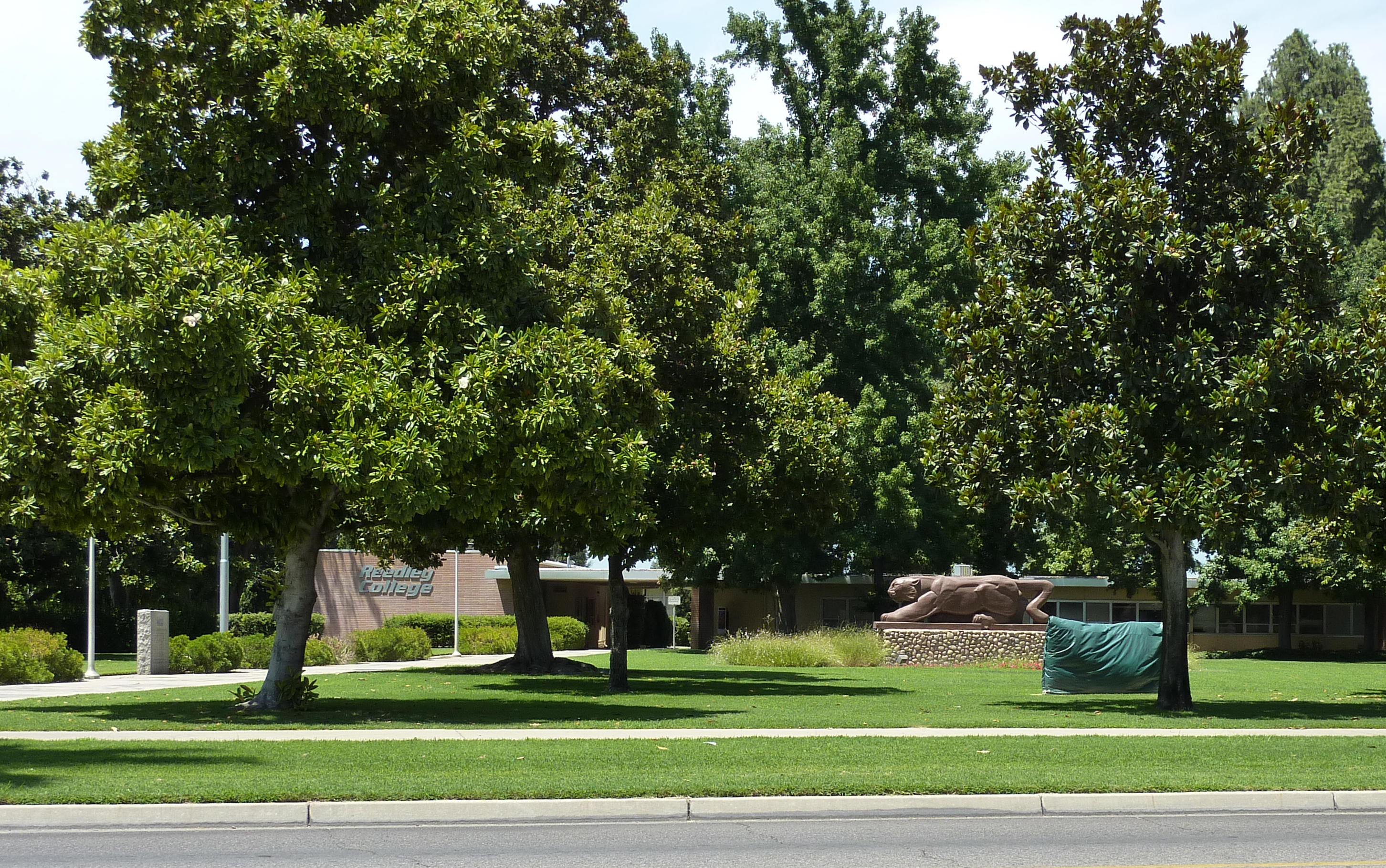
Reedley College

Reedley College (Reedley or RC) is a public community college in Reedley, California, United States. It is a part of the California Community Colleges system within the State Center Community College District (SCCCD). It is accredited by the WASC Accrediting Commission for Community and Junior Colleges. The college offers associate degrees.

== History ==
Reedley College was founded in May 1926 as Reedley Junior College on the campus of Reedley High School. It became independent from the high school on July 1, 1946. In 1954, the school district voted to establish a separate campus for the college, and moved to its present location in 1956 on 420 acres (1.7 km^{2}) of land that had been part of the historic Thomas Law Reed Ranch. About 300 acres (1.2 km^{2}) of the property remain in use as farmland. In 1963, the college joined the SCCCD. The college was renamed Kings River Community College in 1980, but the name Reedley College was restored in July 1998.

Reedley College has served as the parent institution for three college centers. Clovis Community College, then known as the Willow International Center, was a center of Reedley College until July 1, 2015, when it became a separate campus of the SCCCD. Madera Community College opened at its current site in 1996 on 114 acres (46 ha) of donated land and remained a center of Reedley College until 2020, when it became a separate campus of the district. The Oakhurst Community College Center in Oakhurst opened at its current location in 1996 on 2.6 acres (11,000 m^{2}) of land. It became a center of Madera Community College when Madera became a separate campus.

== Housing ==
Reedley College is one of just 13 community colleges in the state of California to offer on-campus housing to students. Sequoia Hall houses 100 women and 100 men. Sequoia Hall is located on the southern corner of the campus. Construction of a new Sequoia Hall to replace the original aging facility started during the summer of 2008 and was completed in spring of 2010. The original building was razed.

== Athletics ==
The Reedley College Athletic Department fields teams in 12 intercollegiate sports with five men's teams and seven women's teams. The Tigers are a member of the Central Valley Conference in all sports except for football, which is a member of the Northern California Football Alliance (NCFA). The Reedley College football team won the Northern California Football Championship, the COA State Championship, and finished #1 in the nation in 2002 with a 12–0 record. The women's basketball team has been to the COA Final 16 more than 4 of the last 10 years. The women's tennis team has become a state power with an undefeated conference record since 2007 and various championship titles in recent years. Tiger athletes have gone on to four-year colleges such as Cal, Texas Tech, Fresno State, Oregon, Boise State, Minnesota, Texas State, and Michigan State, to name a few.

== Notable alumni ==
- Josh Allen, professional football player (did not graduate)
- Rafael Araujo-Lopes, professional football player
- Isaac "Ike" Austin, professional basketball player
- Ervin Baldwin, professional football player
- Dick Cohee, professional football player
- Bobby Cox, professional baseball manager
- Lutu T. S. Fuimaono, politician
- Cliff Hodge, professional basketball player
- Anthony W. Ishii, judge
- Ed Kezirian, college football coach
- Calvin McCarty, professional football player
- Rolan Milligan, professional football player
- Darius Reynolds, professional football player
- Dick Rutan, aviator
- La Schelle Tarver, professional baseball player
- Sonny Vaccaro, sports marketing executive
- Danny Villanueva, professional football player
- Trey Wolfe, professional football player

== Publications ==
- The Chant (Reedley College newspaper)
- Currents (Reedley College newsletter)
- Symmetry (Reedley College works from English and art students)
- Paper Jam (Reedley College Writing Center newsletter)
