= College of the Sequoias =

Community college in Visalia, California, US

- Former name: Visalia Junior College
- Motto: The first step to success
- Type: Public community college
- Established: September 1926; 100 years ago
- Parent institution: California Community Colleges
- Accreditation: ACCJC
- President: Brent Calvin
- Students: 19,351
- Location: Visalia, California, United States; 36.3238°N 119.3152°W
- Campus: 800 acres (320 ha) (Note: Includes main campus (Visalia), Hanford Center and Tulare Center.); City: Midsize (NCES)
- Centers: Hanford, Tulare
- Newspaper: The Campus
- Colors: Blue, orange and green
- Nickname: Giants
- Sporting affiliations: 3C2A – CVC
- Mascot: Timber the Giant
- Website: cos.edu

College of the Sequoias (COS) is a public two-year community college in Visalia, California. Founded in September 1926, it is governed by the Sequoias Community College District and has its main campus in Visalia, with full-service centers in Hanford and Tulare. The college is designated as a Hispanic-Serving Institution. It is named for the Giant Sequoia trees native to the nearby Sierra Nevada mountain range.

== History ==
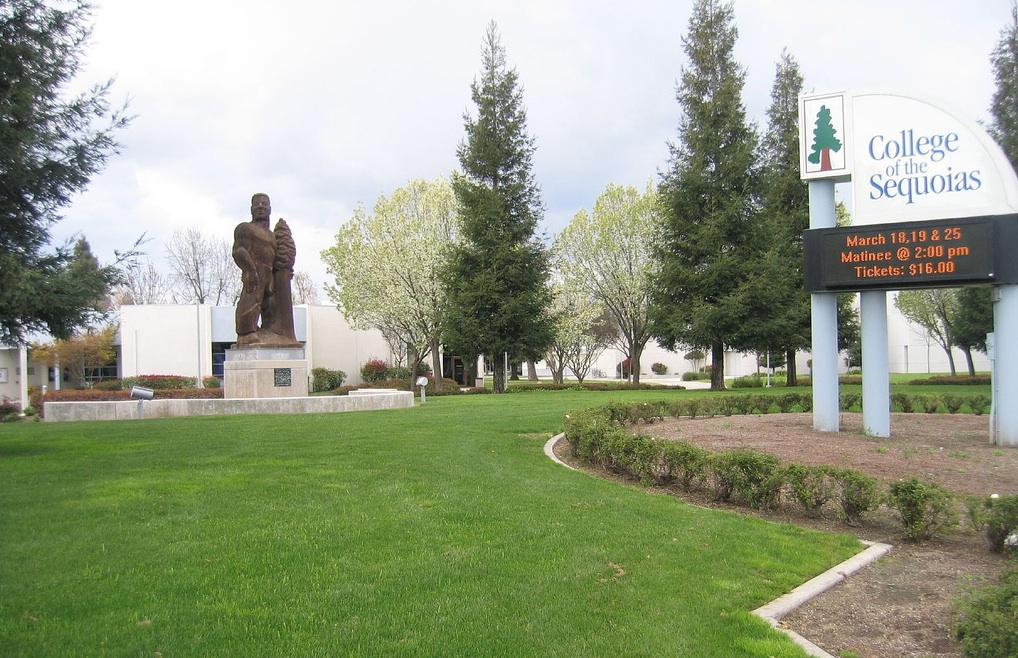
Entrance to Visalia campus, May 2010

College of the Sequoias was established by the Visalia Union High School Board of Trustees in 1925 as Visalia Junior College. The college began offering post-high school instruction in September 1926, with 63 freshmen. Classes were held in a five-room building on the east end of the present-day Redwood High School campus and remained there until 1940.

Enrollment grew during the late 1920s and 1930s, reaching more than 500 students by 1939, while the college expanded its academic and vocational programs. In 1937, it began providing bus service for students living outside Visalia and established a building trades program.

Construction of a new campus began in 1938 on a 55-acre (22 ha) parcel on Mooney Boulevard, approximately two miles from downtown Visalia. The campus opened in September 1940 and remains the college's main campus. It initially consisted of three buildings: a classroom and administration building, a gymnasium, and an industrial arts and trades facility, all designed in the Art Deco style.

In 1940, the college began offering agricultural science courses, which later became part of its agricultural program at a college farm established in 1947.

On January 18, 1949, voters in the Tulare Union High School District and Visalia Union High School District approved the formation of a separate junior college district encompassing the two high school districts. During the spring, students submitted names for the new district, and the Board of Trustees selected College of the Sequoias. The district began operating as the Sequoias Community College District, and Visalia Junior College was subsequently renamed College of the Sequoias.

In 1950, voters in the Exeter Union High School, Woodlake Union High School, and Lindsay Unified districts approved joining the district. In 1962, the Orosi Union High School, Corcoran Unified, Hanford High School, and Westside Unified districts joined. The Strathmore High School District joined in 1976.

By the late 1990s, the district began planning to expand College of the Sequoias beyond its Visalia campus. The district had operated a small storefront facility with several classrooms in the Hanford area since the 1980s and leased a larger facility there in 1992. In 2001, the district entered into an agreement with the City of Hanford and Hanford Joint Union High School District to acquire 180 acres (73 ha) for a new high school, athletic complex, and permanent College of the Sequoias campus. A bond approved in 2006 helped fund construction of the college campus, which opened in 2010. The California Community Colleges Chancellor's Office officially designated the Hanford campus as a center in 2015. In addition to general education courses, the Hanford Center houses the college's police and fire training programs.

The district purchased a 500-acre (200 ha) site in Tulare in 1998 for the college's agricultural programs and farm, however the Tulare College Center would not open until January 2013. The center has since expanded to include applied technology programs in industrial maintenance, electrician training, welding, and construction.

== Campus and centers ==
College of the Sequoias' main campus is in Visalia, with full-service centers in Hanford and Tulare. All three locations offer general education courses, while each has a specialized programs that are primarily offered at that location.

The Visalia campus houses the college's Nursing and Allied Health programs, the Hanford center houses the college's police and fire academies, and the Tulare center houses the college's agriculture programs and farm.

In addition to its three primary campuses, the district offers courses at off-campus locations, primarily through its dual enrollment and English as a Second Language programs. Classes are offered at high schools and community centers in smaller communities throughout the district, including Lindsay, Farmersville, Orosi, Exeter, Corcoran, and Woodlake.

== Academics ==
In the 2024-25 academic year, 19,351 students were enrolled at the College of the Sequoias, representing 11,311 full-time equivalent students. In fall 2024, 74.1% of students enrolled in the district identified as Hispanic. In 2024, 9,476 students were enrolled at the Visalia campus, 2,282 at the Hanford center, and 2,157 at the Tulare center. College of the Sequoias is accredited by the Accrediting Commission for Community and Junior Colleges (ACCJC).

== Student life ==
=== Athletics ===
The college athletics teams are nicknamed the Giants, and COS sponsors 14 teams which participate in the Central Valley Conference.

== Notable alumni ==
- Wilson Alvarez – American football player
- Creed Bratton – American musician The Grass Roots and actor The Office
- Bonnie Bryant – First golfer to win on the LPGA Tour playing left-handed
- Linda Gist Calvin – 41st President General of the Daughters of the American Revolution
- Joseph James DeAngelo – convicted as the Golden State Killer and the Visalia Ransacker in 2020, was a police officer in Exeter from 1973 to 1976, around the same time as when the Ransacker crimes occurred in neighboring Visalia
- Crystal Galindo – Xicana artist
- Quincy Hall - World Champion Professional sprinter and 2024 Olympic gold medalist in the 400 meters
- DeeAndre Hulett – American basketball player
- Dylan Lee – American baseball player
- Dannie Lockett – American football player
- Devin Nunes – U.S. Representative for California's 22nd congressional district
- Steve Perry – American singer and songwriter best known as the lead vocalist of the rock band Journey
- J. G. Quintel – Animator who created Regular Show for Cartoon Network and Close Enough for TBS
- Sheldon Richardson – American football defensive tackle for the Cleveland Browns of the National Football League (NFL)
- Windham Rotunda – American professional wrestler who used the ring name Bray Wyatt
- David Valadao – U.S. Representative for California's 21st congressional district
