= Fresno City College =

Community college in Fresno, California, U.S.

Coordinates: 36°46′02.7″N 119°47′52.3″W

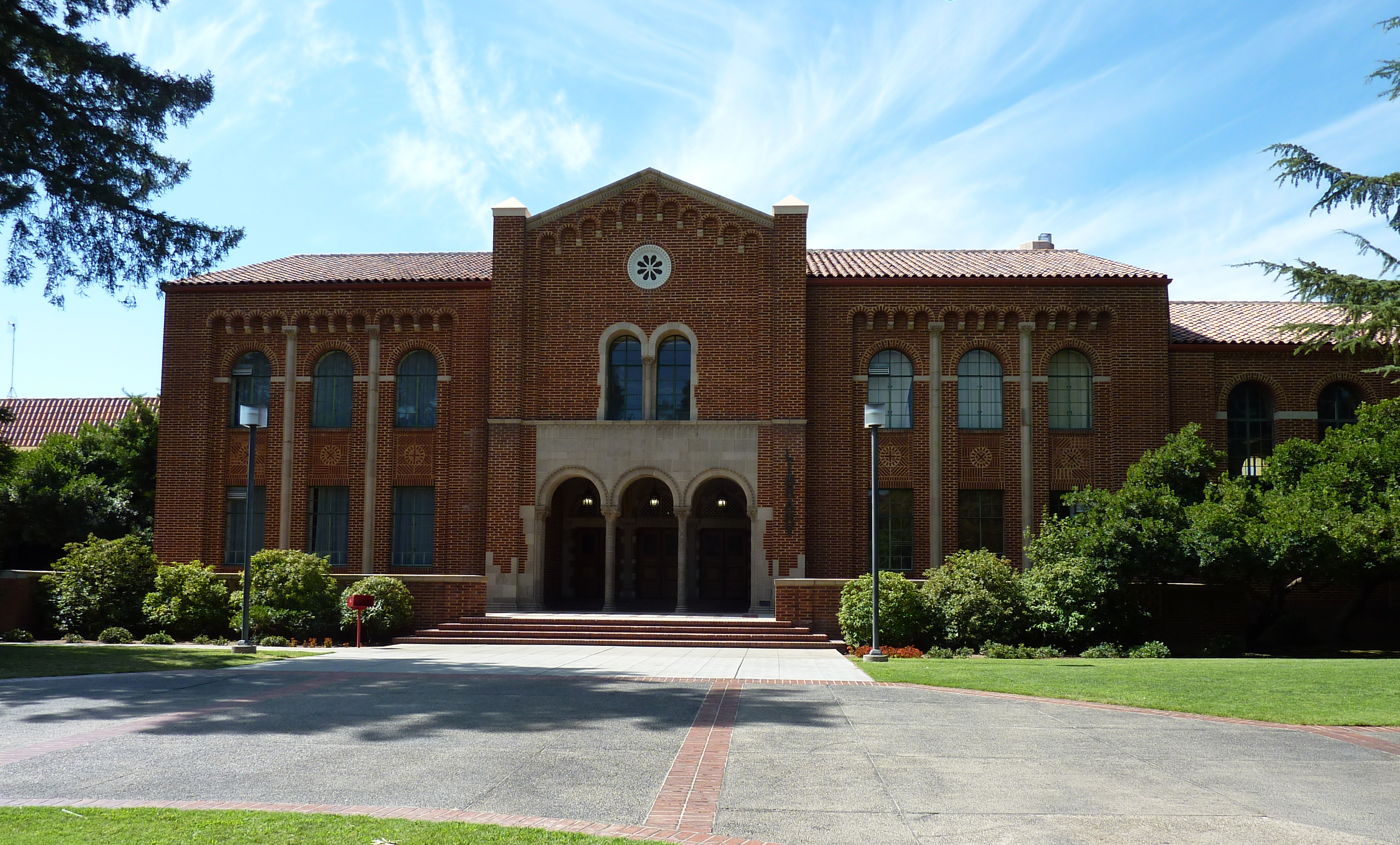
- Fresno City College Library completed in 1933.
- Former name: Fresno Junior College
- Type: Public community college
- Established: 1910
- Parent institution: State Center Community College District, California Community Colleges system
- Chancellor: Dr. Carole Goldsmith
- President: Denise Whisenhunt
- Students: 21,002
- Location: Fresno, California, United States
- Campus: Urban
- Colors: Red and White
- Mascot: Rams
- Website: www.fresnocitycollege.edu

California Historical Landmark
- Reference no.: 803

Fresno City College (FCC or "Fresno City") is a public community college in Fresno, California. It is part of the State Center Community College District within the California Community Colleges system. Fresno City College operates on a semester schedule and offers associate degrees and certificates.

== History ==
The process of starting Fresno City College began in 1907 with the superintendent of schools C. L. McLane advocating for higher education in the San Joaquin Valley. Fresno City College opened its doors in 1910 as Fresno Junior College with an inaugural class of 20 students and three instructors. At the time, it was the first community college in the state of California and the second in the nation. It was located two miles south of today's campus.

== Academics ==
The college is accredited by the Accrediting Commission for Community and Junior Colleges. It offers associate degrees and a certificate of completion. Students can also apply to and attend the on-campus Police Academy, a basic police officer academy accredited by California Police Officer Standards and Training.

== Campus ==
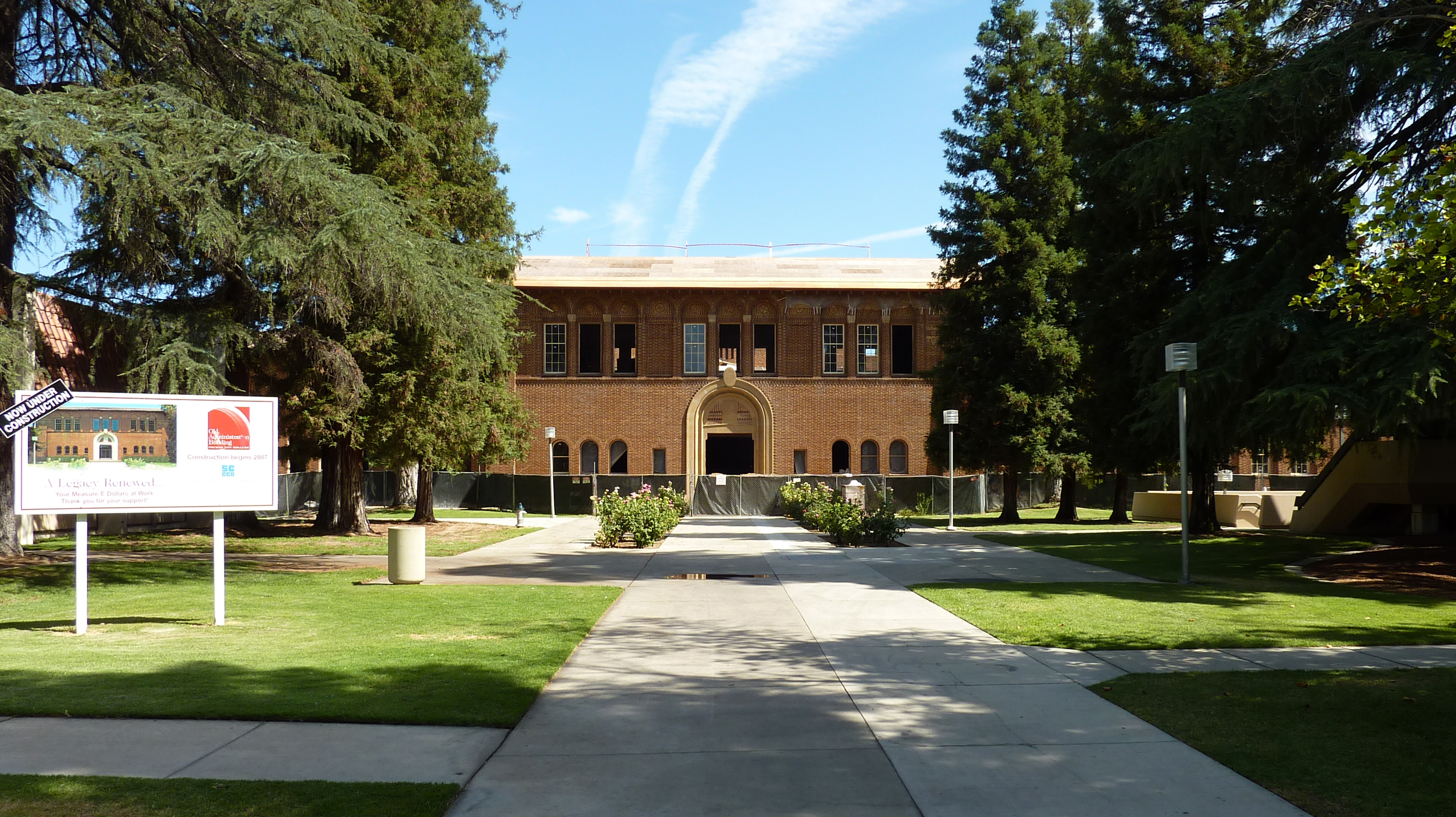
The Old Administration Building is the oldest structure on the FCC campus.

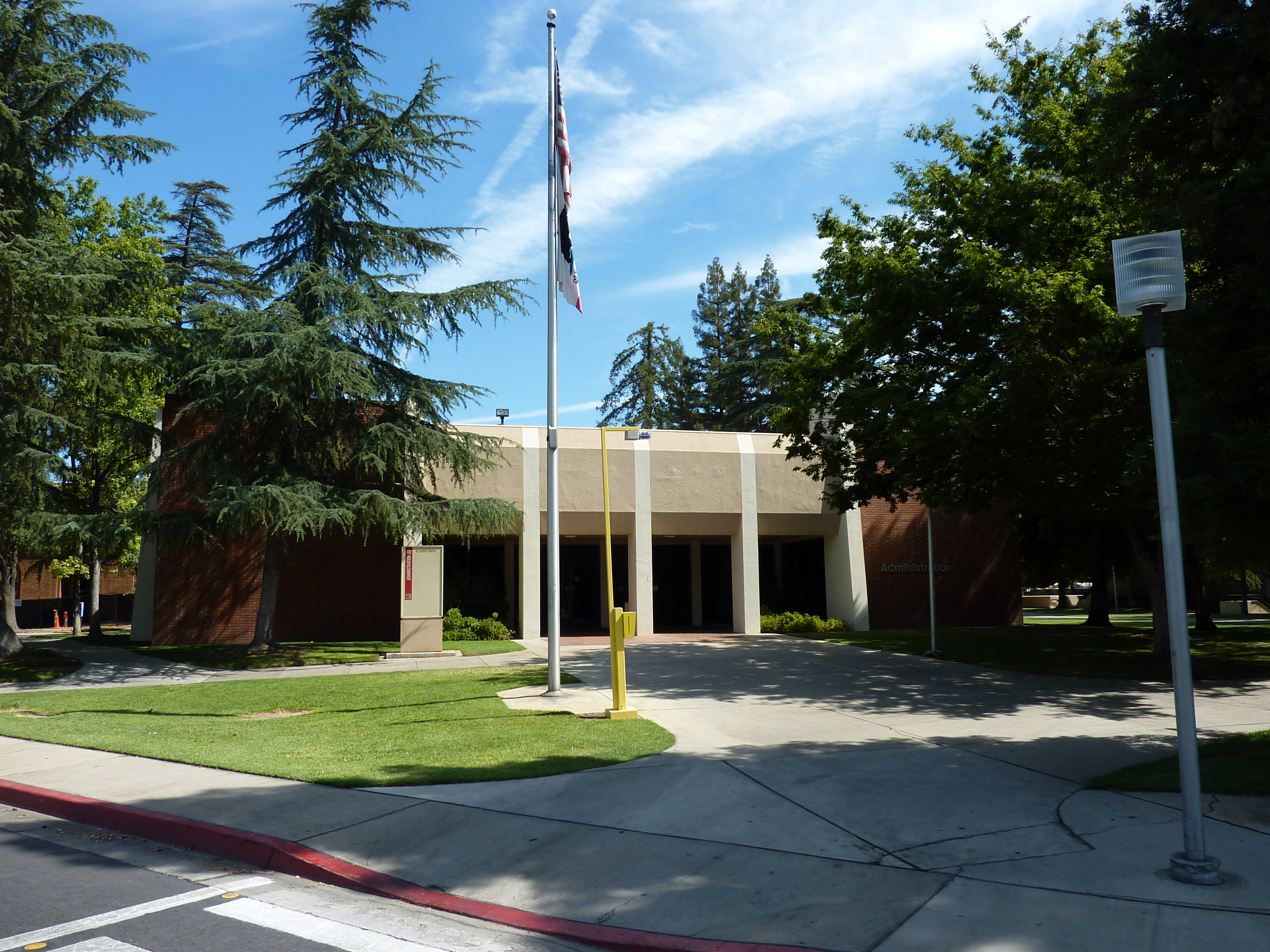
Administration Building

The Fresno City College campus is located near the Tower District in downtown Fresno. A new secondary campus, located south of Edison High School, is scheduled to open for the Fall 2023 semester.

== Organization and administration ==
Fresno City College is a part of the State Center Community College District (SCCCD). Denise Whisenhunt is the president of Fresno City College, and Carole Goldsmith is the chancellor of the SCCCD.

== Student life ==
=== Media ===
- The Rampage (newspaper)
- City at a Glance (newsletter)
- The Ram's Tale (works by English & Art students)
- IntenseCITY (magazine)

=== Athletics ===
The college athletic teams are named the Rams.

Fresno City has won 369 men's & women's conference championships in total, and 56 CCCAA state championships.

- Men's basketball (1955, 1963, 2005*, 2007 & 2012)
- Women's soccer (1988 & 2017**)
- Baseball (1961, 1962, 1963, 1972 & 1992)
- Football (1968, 1969, 1972 & 1973)
- Women's tennis (1999 & 2000)
- Men's tennis*** (2004, 2012, 2013 & 2014)
- Women's volleyball (2016 & 2021)
- Badminton (2016)
- Men's soccer (2017 & 2019)
- Wrestling has won 12 CCCAA duel championships (1992, 1994, 1996, 1998, 2001, 2010, 2011, 2012, 2014 & 2017). They have also won 17 team championships (1959, 1962, 1975, 1989, 1993, 1994, 1998, 2001, 2006, 2008, 2010, 2011, 2012, 2016, 2017, 2018 & 2019).

* 2005 Fresno City Men's Basketball team went undefeated, 34–0.
** 2017 Women's Soccer team went 25–0–2 and was awarded the JC Division III National Championship.
*** 2009 Fresno City Men's Tennis team of Kirill Sinitsyn/Joao Nogueira were crowned Doubles Champions at the ITA National Small College Championship.

=== Demographics ===
Student body composition as of fall 2017
Race and ethnicity	Total
Hispanic	57.3%
White	20.9%
Asian	11.5%
Black	5.3%
Gender
Female	52.6%
Male	45.8%
Age
Under 20	31.6%
20 to 24	30.5%
25 to 39	28.1%
40 or more	9.9%

== Notable people ==
=== Academics ===
- Harry Edwards, sports sociologist and civil rights activist
- Gary Soto, Mexican-American poet and children's author, professor of writing

=== Sportspeople ===
==== Baseball ====
- Lloyd Allen, former Major League Baseball pitcher, played for the California Angels, Texas Rangers, & Chicago White Sox
- Rob Deer, former Major League Baseball right fielder, played with the San Francisco Giants, Milwaukee Brewers, Detroit Tigers, Boston Red Sox, Hanshin Tigers, and the San Diego Padres
- Alec Gamboa, Major League Baseball pitcher with the Boston Red Sox, former pitcher in the KBO League
- Ted Lilly, former Major League Baseball pitcher, played for the Montreal Expos, Washington Nationals, New York Yankees, Oakland A's, Toronto Blue Jays, Chicago Cubs & Los Angeles Dodgers
- Jim Maloney, former Major League Baseball pitcher and All-Star; played for the Cincinnati Reds & California Angels
- Tom Seaver, former Major League Baseball pitcher, member of the Baseball Hall of Fame; played for the New York Mets, Cincinnati Reds, Chicago White Sox, and Boston Red Sox
- Marcus Walden, Major League Baseball pitcher, played for the Boston Red Sox; currently in the Seattle Mariners organization

==== American football ====
- Greg Boyd, former NFL defensive end with the New England Patriots, Denver Broncos, Green Bay Packers, San Francisco 49ers, and Los Angeles Raiders
- Tony Curtis, former NFL tight end
- Zach Diles, former NFL linebacker
- Tom Flores, 2-time Super Bowl champion head coach of the Oakland Raiders; former head coach of the Seattle Seahawks; member of the FCC Football Wall of Fame, member of the Pro Football Hall of Fame Class of 2021
- Matt Giordano, defensive back for the St. Louis Rams (Super Bowl Champion with the 2006 Indianapolis Colts) has played for Indianapolis Colts, Green Bay Packers, Atlanta Falcons, New Orleans Saints & Oakland Raiders
- Jim Merlo, former NFL linebacker
- Maurice Morris, former NFL running back
- Alex Stewart, former NFL defensive end, played for the Minnesota Vikings and Dallas Cowboys
- Andrew Stewart, retired NFL and CFL defensive end
- Cameron Worrell, former defensive back, played for the Chicago Bears, Miami Dolphins & New York Jets; former defensive backs coach for the Fresno City College Football team; sideline analyst for Fresno State Football

==== Others ====
- Rafer Alston, NBA free agent; member of the 2008/2009 Orlando Magic Eastern Conference Championship team
- Zoila Gurgel, professional mixed martial artist, won the Bellator Women's 115 lb Championship
