= 1987 Ellsworth Panthers football team =

American college football season

1987 Ellsworth Panthers football

NJCAA champion

RC Cola Bowl, W 41–9 vs. Harper
- Conference: Iowa Junior College Conference
- Record: 10–0 (4–0 IJCC)
- Head coach: Lloyd Sisco (5th season)

1987 Iowa Junior College Conference football standings
| | Conf. | | | | | Overall |
| Team | W | | L | | T | W | | L | | T |
|---|---|---|---|---|---|---|---|---|---|---|
| Ellsworth $ | 4 | – | 0 | – | 0 | 10 | – | 0 | – | 0 |
| Waldorf | 2 | – | 2 | – | 0 | 7 | – | 3 | – | 0 |
| Iowa Lakes | 2 | – | 2 | – | 0 | 6 | – | 3 | – | 0 |
| North Iowa Area | 1 | – | 3 | – | 0 | 5 | – | 4 | – | 0 |
| Iowa Central | 1 | – | 3 | – | 0 | 3 | – | 4 | – | 0 |
$ – Conference champion

The 1987 Ellsworth Panthers football team was an American football team that represented Ellsworth Community College as a member of the Iowa Junior College Conference (IJCC) during the 1987 junior college football season. In their fifth year under head coach Lloyd Sisco, the Panthers compiled a perfect 10–0 record, defeated Harper in the RC Cola Bowl, and won the NJCAA National Football Championship. It was Ellsworth's second national championship, following the 1976 team.

== Schedule ==
| Date | Opponent | Site | Result | Source |
|---|---|---|---|---|
| September 5 | Dodge City* | Iowa Falls, IA | W 42–6 | |
| September 12 | Iowa Central* | Iowa Falls, IA | W 14–3 | |
| September 26 | at Waldorf | Forest City, IA | W 34–3 | |
| October 3 | at Iowa Lakes | Esthervlle, IA | W 65–14 | |
| October 11 | Northwest Missouri State JV* | Iowa Falls, IA | W 61–0 | |
| October 17 | North Iowa Area | Iowa Falls, IA | W 60–7 | |
| October 25 | at Iowa Central | Fort Dodge, IA | W 22–0 | |
| October 31 | at Butler County (KS)* | El Dorado, KS | W 30–21 | |
| November 7 | Grand Rapids* | Iowa Falls, IA | W 63–23 | |
| November 22 | Harper* | UNI-Dome; Iowa Falls, IA (RC Cola Bowl) | W 41–9 | |
*Non-conference game
