= 1971 junior college football season =

American junior college football season

- National Championship: Shrine Bowl, Savannah, GA (NJCAA)
- Champion(s): Mississippi Gulf Coast (NJCAA)

The 1971 junior college football season was the season of intercollegiate junior college football running from September to December 1971. Mississippi Gulf Coast won the NJCAA National Football Championship, defeating Fort Scott in the Shrine Bowl in Savannah, Georgia.

El Camino won the California state junior college large division playoffs, defeating Santa Rosa in the championship game at Bakersfield College Stadium in Bakersfield, California, while Reedley won the California state junior college small division playoffs, beating Hartnell in the title game at Ratcliffe Stadium in Fresno, California.

== Conference standings ==
=== California ===
==== Large division ====
1971 Camino Norte Conference football standings
	Conf.					Overall
Team	W		L		T	W		L		T
Santa Rosa +^	4	–	1	–	0	10	–	2	–	0
West Valley +	4	–	1	–	0	7	–	2	–	0
Contra Costa	3	–	2	–	0	4	–	4	–	1
De Anza	3	–	2	–	0	4	–	5	–	0
Solano	1	–	4	–	0	5	–	4	–	0
Marin	0	–	5	–	0	0	–	9	–	0
$ – Conference champion; ^ – California state junior college large division playoff participant

1971 Golden Gate Conference football standings
	Conf.					Overall
Team	W		L		T	W		L		T
Laney +	6	–	1	–	0	9	–	1	–	0
San Mateo +^	6	–	1	–	0	9	–	2	–	0
Chabot	5	–	2	–	0	7	–	3	–	0
San Jose City	5	–	2	–	0	6	–	4	–	0
Diablo Valley	2	–	5	–	0	4	–	6	–	0
Foothill	2	–	5	–	0	3	–	7	–	0
CC of San Francisco	2	–	5	–	0	2	–	7	–	0
Merritt	0	–	7	–	0	0	–	10	–	0
+ – Conference co-champions; ^ – California state junior college large division playoff participant

1971 Metropolitan Conference football standings
	Conf.					Overall
Team	W		L		T	W		L		T
El Camino $^	6	–	0	–	0	11	–	1	–	0
Bakersfield	4	–	2	–	0	7	–	2	–	0
Pierce	4	–	2	–	0	7	–	2	–	0
Pasadena	3	–	3	–	0	6	–	3	–	0
Long Beach	2	–	4	–	0	5	–	5	–	0
Santa Monica	2	–	4	–	0	3	–	6	–	0
Los Angeles Valley	0	–	6	–	0	1	–	8	–	0
$ – Conference champion; ^ – California state junior college large division playoff participant

1971 Mission Conference football standings
	Conf.					Overall
Team	W		L		T	W		L		T
Citrus $^	7	–	0	–	0	8	–	3	–	0
Saddleback	5	–	2	–	0	7	–	3	–	0
Southwestern (CA)	3	–	3	–	1	6	–	3	–	1
Riverside	3	–	3	–	1	5	–	4	–	1
Chaffey	3	–	3	–	1	4	–	5	–	1
Grossmont	3	–	4	–	0	4	–	5	–	0
Palomar	2	–	4	–	1	3	–	6	–	1
San Bernardino	0	–	7	–	0	1	–	8	–	0
$ – Conference champion; ^ – California state junior college large division playoff participant

1971 South Coast Conference (California) football standings
	Conf.					Overall
Team	W		L		T	W		L		T
Orange Coast +^	5	–	1	–	0	7	–	2	–	1
Santa Ana +	5	–	1	–	0	6	–	3	–	0
Fullerton	4	–	2	–	0	5	–	4	–	0
Cerritos	3	–	3	–	0	4	–	5	–	0
San Diego Mesa	2	–	4	–	0	6	–	4	–	0
Mt. San Antonio	2	–	4	–	0	2	–	8	–	0
San Diego City	0	–	6	–	0	0	–	10	–	0
+ – Conference co-champions; ^ – California state junior college large division playoff participant

1971 Southern California Conference football standings
	Conf.					Overall
Team	W		L		T	W		L		T
East Los Angeles +	4	–	1	–	0	7	–	2	–	0
Los Angeles City +	4	–	1	–	0	6	–	3	–	0
Rio Hondo +^	4	–	1	–	0	6	–	5	–	0
Harbor	2	–	3	–	0	4	–	5	–	0
Golden West	1	–	4	–	0	3	–	5	–	1
Cypress	0	–	5	–	0	3	–	6	–	0
$ – Conference champion; ^ – California state junior college large division playoff participant

1971 Valley Conference football standings
	Conf.					Overall
Team	W		L		T	W		L		T
San Joaquin Delta $^	4	–	0	–	1	8	–	2	–	1
Sequoias	4	–	1	–	0	8	–	1	–	1
Fresno City	3	–	1	–	1	3	–	4	–	1
Modesto	2	–	3	–	0	2	–	6	–	1
American River	1	–	4	–	0	4	–	5	–	0
Sacramento City	0	–	5	–	0	1	–	8	–	0
$ – Conference champion; ^ – California state junior college large division playoff participant

1971 Western State Conference football standings
	Conf.					Overall
Team	W		L		T	W		L		T
Santa Barbara City $^	6	–	0	–	0	9	–	2	–	0
Moorpark	4	–	2	–	0	7	–	3	–	0
Compton	4	–	2	–	0	5	–	5	–	0
West Los Angeles	3	–	3	–	0	5	–	4	–	0
Ventura	2	–	4	–	0	4	–	5	–	0
Glendale (CA)	2	–	4	–	0	4	–	5	–	0
Antelope Valley	0	–	6	–	0	2	–	7	–	0
$ – Conference champion; ^ – California state junior college large division playoff participant

==== Small division ====
1971 Central Conference football standings
	Conf.					Overall
Team	W		L		T	W		L		T
Reedley $^	5	–	0	–	0	9	–	1	–	2
Hancock	4	–	1	–	0	8	–	2	–	0
Merced	2	–	3	–	0	5	–	5	–	0
West Hills	2	–	3	–	0	3	–	7	–	0
Cuesta	1	–	4	–	0	3	–	6	–	0
Porterville	1	–	4	–	0	2	–	8	–	0
$ – Conference champion; ^ – California state junior college small division playoff participant

1971 Coast Conference football standings
	Conf.					Overall
Team	W		L		T	W		L		T
Hartnell $^	5	–	0	–	0	9	–	2	–	1
Gavilan	4	–	1	–	0	7	–	2	–	0
Monterey Peninsula	2	–	3	–	0	5	–	5	–	0
Cabrillo	2	–	3	–	0	4	–	6	–	0
Ohlone	2	–	3	–	0	2	–	7	–	0
Menlo	0	–	5	–	0	2	–	7	–	0
$ – Conference champion; ^ – California state junior college small division playoff participant

1971 Desert Conference football standings
	Conf.					Overall
Team	W		L		T	W		L		T
College of the Canyons $^	7	–	0	–	0	8	–	2	–	0
Victor Valley	6	–	1	–	0	7	–	2	–	0
Desert	4	–	3	–	0	6	–	4	–	0
Palo Verde	4	–	3	–	0	5	–	5	–	0
Imperial Valley	3	–	4	–	0	3	–	7	–	0
MiraCosta	3	–	4	–	0	3	–	7	–	0
Mt. San Jacinto	1	–	6	–	0	1	–	6	–	0
Barstow	0	–	7	–	0	0	–	10	–	0
$ – Conference champion; ^ – California state junior college small division playoff participant

1971 Golden Valley Conference football standings
	Conf.					Overall
Team	W		L		T	W		L		T
Redwoods $^	6	–	0	–	0	9	–	1	–	0
Butte	5	–	1	–	0	8	–	1	–	0
Siskiyous	3	–	3	–	0	7	–	3	–	0
Yuba	3	–	3	–	0	5	–	4	–	0
Sierra	2	–	4	–	0	3	–	5	–	0
Shasta	2	–	4	–	0	3	–	6	–	0
Napa	0	–	6	–	0	0	–	10	–	0
$ – Conference champion; ^ – California state junior college small division playoff participant

=== NJCAA ===
1971 Arizona Junior College Athletic Conference football standings
	Conf.					Overall
Team	W		L		T	W		L		T
Arizona Western $	4	–	0	–	0	9	–	1	–	0
Phoenix	3	–	1	–	0	9	–	1	–	0
Mesa (AZ)	2	–	2	–	0	7	–	2	–	0
Glendale (AZ)	1	–	3	–	0	3	–	6	–	0
Eastern Arizona	0	–	4	–	0	2	–	6	–	0
$ – Conference champion

1971 Coastal Football Conference standings
	Conf.					Overall
Team	W		L		T	W		L		T
Ferrum $	5	–	0	–	1	8	–	0	–	1
Lees–McRae	4	–	1	–	1	6	–	3	–	1
Baltimore	3	–	2	–	1	6	–	2	–	1
Wesley	3	–	3	–	0	6	–	3	–	0
Potomac State	3	–	3	–	0	5	–	4	–	0
Chowan	1	–	4	–	1	3	–	4	–	1
Harford	0	–	6	–	0	1	–	8	–	0
$ – Conference champion

1971 Intermountain Collegiate Athletic Conference football standings
	Conf.					Overall
Team	W		L		T	W		L		T
Ricks $	3	–	0	–	0	7	–	3	–	0
Dixie (UT)	1	–	2	–	0	5	–	4	–	0
Snow	1	–	3	–	0	?	–	?	–	?
$ – Conference champion

1971 Iowa Junior College Conference football standings
	Conf.					Overall
Team	W		L		T	W		L		T
Indian Hills $	5	–	0	–	1	6	–	2	–	1
Ellsworth	5	–	1	–	0	7	–	2	–	1
Waldorf	3	–	2	–	1	4	–	4	–	1
Iowa Central	3	–	3	–	0	4	–	5	–	0
Marshalltown	2	–	4	–	0	5	–	4	–	0
Iowa Lakes	1	–	5	–	0	4	–	5	–	0
North Iowa Area	1	–	5	–	0	2	–	7	–	0
$ – Conference champion

1971 Mississippi Junior College Conference football standings
	Conf.					Overall
Team	W		L		T	W		L		T
North Division
Mississippi Delta xy	5	–	0	–	1	6	–	3	–	1
East Central (MS)	5	–	1	–	0	7	–	3	–	0
Northwest Mississippi	4	–	2	–	0	5	–	5	–	0
Itawamba	3	–	2	–	1	5	–	4	–	1
East Mississippi	2	–	4	–	0	3	–	7	–	0
Holmes	1	–	6	–	0	1	–	9	–	0
Northeast Mississippi	0	–	6	–	0	0	–	10	–	0
South Division
Mississippi Gulf Coast xy$	5	–	0	–	0	11	–	0	–	0
Pearl River	4	–	1	–	0	9	–	1	–	0
Jones County	3	–	2	–	0	6	–	4	–	0
Copiah–Lincoln	2	–	3	–	0	7	–	3	–	0
Southwest Mississippi	1	–	4	–	0	2	–	7	–	0
Hinds	0	–	5	–	0	2	–	7	–	0
Championship: Mississippi Gulf Coast 26, Mississippi Delta 14
$ – Conference champion; x – Division champion/co-champions

1971 Northwest Community College Conference football standings
	Conf.					Overall
Team	W		L		T	W		L		T
Eastern Division
Wenatchee Valley xy$	7	–	1	–	0	9	–	1	–	0
Columbia Basin	5	–	2	–	0	6	–	2	–	1
Spokane Falls	5	–	3	–	0	6	–	3	–	0
Yakima	3	–	5	–	0	3	–	6	–	0
Walla Walla	1	–	7	–	0	2	–	7	–	0
Western Division
Grays Harbor xy	5	–	2	–	1	6	–	3	–	1
Mt. Hood	5	–	3	–	0	6	–	3	–	0
Olympic	3	–	3	–	2	3	–	4	–	2
Everett	0	–	8	–	0	1	–	8	–	0
NWCCC championship game: Wenatchee Valley 35, Grays Harbor 14
$ – Conference champion; x – Division champion/co-champions; y – Championship game participant

1971 Texas Junior College Football Federation standings
	Conf.					Overall
Team	W		L		T	W		L		T
Tyler $	7	–	0	–	0	9	–	2	–	0
Kilgore	6	–	1	–	0	8	–	2	–	1
Wharton	5	–	2	–	0	7	–	3	–	0
Navarro	4	–	3	–	0	6	–	3	–	1
Blinn	2	–	4	–	0	4	–	5	–	0
Henderson County	2	–	5	–	0	3	–	7	–	0
Cisco	1	–	5	–	0	4	–	5	–	0
Ranger	0	–	7	–	0	0	–	9	–	0
$ – Conference champion

== California state playoffs ==
=== Large division ===
Quarterfinals; November 26–27
Citrus	14
El Camino	42
Rio Hondo	34
Santa Barbara City	24
San Mateo	0
San Joaquin Delta	9
Orange Coast	22
Santa Rosa	26

Semifinals; December 4
El Camino	51
Rio Hondo	36
San Joaquin Delta	15
Santa Rosa	39

Championship game December 11; Bakersfield College Stadium—Bakersfield, California
El Camino	48
Santa Rosa	14

=== Small division ===
Semifinals; November 27
Reedley	74
College of the Canyons	20
Redwoods	15
Hartnell	37

Championship game December 4 Ratcliffe Stadium—Fresno, CA
Reedley	20
Hartnell	10
