= 2022 junior college football season =

American junior college football season

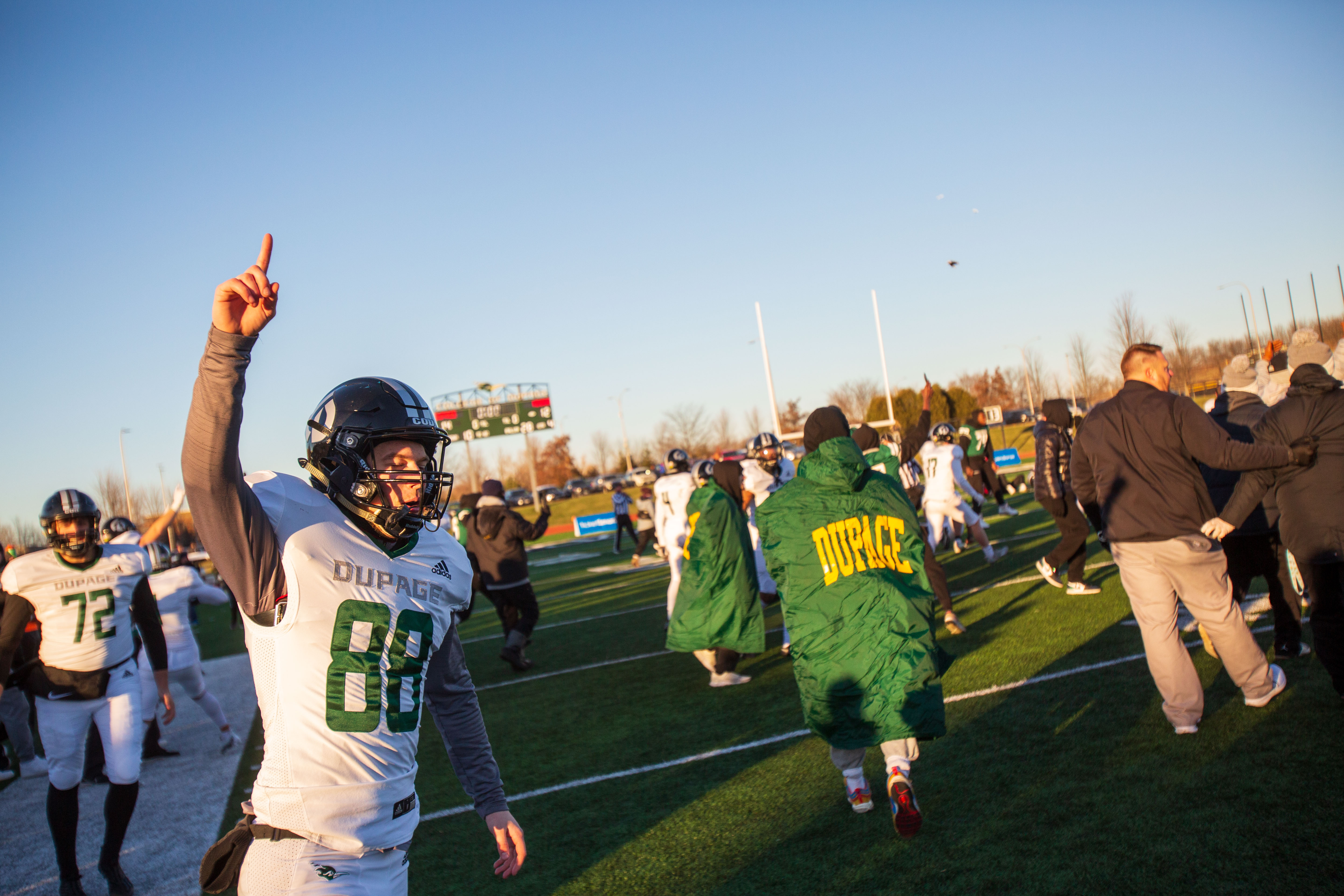
- 2022 Red Grange Bowl champions DuPage
- National Championship: Red Grange Bowl, Glen Ellyn, IL, (NJCAA D-III)
- Champion(s): Iowa Western (NJCAA D-I); DuPage (NJCAA D-III); San Mateo (CCCAA)

The 2022 junior college football season was the season of intercollegiate junior college football running from September to December 2022. The season ended with three national champions: two from the National Junior College Athletic Association's (NJCAA) Division I and Division III and one from the California Community College Athletic Association (CCCAA).

The NJCAA Division I champion was Iowa Western who defeated Hutchinson 31–0 in the NJCAA National Football Championship. The NJCAA Division III champion was DuPage who defeated NDSCS 14–12 in the Red Grange Bowl. The CCCAA champion was San Mateo who defeated Riverside City 55–0 in the CCCAA State Championship.

== Conference standings ==
=== NJCAA Division I ===
2022 Iowa Community College Athletic Conference football standings
	Conf.			Overall
Team	W		L	W		L
No. 1 Iowa Western $^	2	–	0	10	–	2
No. 10 Iowa Central	1	–	1	7	–	4
Ellsworth	0	–	2	0	–	10
$ – Conference champion; ^ – NJCAA Division I playoff participant; Rankings from NJCAA Division I poll

2022 Northeast Football Conference standings
	Conf.			Overall
Team	W		L	W		L
No. 13 Lackawanna $	2	–	0	7	–	3
Monroe	0	–	2	3	–	5
$ – Conference champion; Rankings from NJCAA Division I poll

2022 Kansas Jayhawk Community College Conference football standings
	Conf.			Overall
Team	W		L	W		L
No. 2 Hutchinson $^	6	–	0	11	–	1
No. 5 Coffeyville	4	–	2	8	–	3
No. 9 Butler (KS)	4	–	2	8	–	4
Independence	3	–	3	4	–	5
Garden City	3	–	3	4	–	6
Dodge City	1	–	5	3	–	7
Highland (KS)	0	–	6	2	–	8
$ – Conference champion; ^ – NJCAA Division I playoff participant; Rankings from NJCAA Division I poll

2022 Southwest Junior College Football Conference standings
	Conf.			Overall
Team	W		L	W		L
No. 14 Trinity Valley †	7	–	0	8	–	3
No. 7 New Mexico Military †y	5	–	2	9	–	3
No. 15 Navarro †	5	–	2	6	–	4
No. 11 Kilgore †y$	4	–	3	8	–	4
Tyler	4	–	3	5	–	4
Blinn	1	–	6	3	–	6
Cisco	1	–	6	3	–	6
Northeastern Oklahoma A&M	1	–	6	3	–	6
Championship: Kilgore 39, New Mexico Military 12
$ – Conference champion; † – Conference playoff participant; y – Championship game participant; Rankings from NJCAA Division I poll

2022 Mississippi Association of Community and Junior Colleges football standings
	Conf.			Overall
Team	W		L	W		L
North Division
No. 3 Northwest Mississippi x†y^	6	–	0	10	–	2
No. 6 East Mississippi †y$	4	–	2	8	–	3
Holmes	3	–	3	5	–	4
Northeast Mississippi	3	–	3	5	–	4
Itawamba	3	–	3	3	–	6
Coahoma	1	–	5	1	–	8
Mississippi Delta	1	–	5	1	–	8
South Division
No. 8 Jones (MS) x†	5	–	1	8	–	2
Mississippi Gulf Coast x†	5	–	1	6	–	4
Pearl River	4	–	2	6	–	3
Copiah–Lincoln	3	–	3	5	–	4
Hinds	3	–	3	4	–	5
Southwest Mississippi	1	–	5	3	–	6
East Central (MS)	0	–	6	1	–	8
Championship: East Mississippi 36, Northwest Mississippi 28
$ – Conference champion; x – Division champion/co-champions; † – Conference playoff participant; y – Championship game participant; ^ – NJCAA Division I playoff participant; Rankings from NJCAA Division I poll

2022 NJCAA Division I independents football records
	Conf.			Overall
Team	W		L	W		L
No. 12 Georgia Military		–		8	–	2
No. 4 Snow		–		8	–	2
Sussex County		–		3	–	6
ASA Miami		–		2	–	4
Community Christian (MI)		–		1	–	3
Community Christian (CA)		–		0	–	1
Rankings from NJCAA Division I poll

=== NJCAA Division III ===
2022 Minnesota College Athletic Conference football standings
	Conf.			Overall
Team	W		L	W		L
No. 3 Minnesota State C&T †y	6	–	0	9	–	1
No. 1 NDSCS †y$^	5	–	1	9	–	2
Rochester C&T †	3	–	3	5	–	5
Central Lakes †	2	–	3	4	–	4
Mesabi Range †	2	–	4	2	–	6
Minnesota West C&T †	1	–	4	2	–	6
Vermilion †	0	–	4	0	–	5
Championship: NDSCS 19, Minnesota State C&T 0
$ – Conference champion; † – Conference playoff participant; y – Championship game participant; ^ – Red Grange Bowl participant; Rankings from NJCAA Division III poll

2022 NJCAA Division III independents football records
	Conf.			Overall
Team	W		L	W		L
No. 2 DuPage ^		–		9	–	2
No. 4 Hocking		–		6	–	3
Louisburg		–		5	–	3
Hudson Valley		–		6	–	4
No. 5 Nassau		–		6	–	4
Erie		–		1	–	9
^ – Red Grange Bowl participate; Rankings from NJCAA Division III poll

=== CCCAA ===
==== SCFA ====
2022 American Metro League standings
	Conf.			Overall
Team	W		L	W		L
No. 17 Citrus $	5	–	0	11	–	0
Santa Ana	4	–	1	5	–	5
Glendale (CA)	3	–	2	5	–	5
Orange Coast	2	–	3	3	–	7
West Los Angeles	1	–	4	3	–	7
Los Angeles Southwest	0	–	5	0	–	10
$ – Conference champion; Rankings from CCCAA poll

2022 National Central League standings
	Conf.			Overall
Team	W		L	W		L
No. 1 Riverside City $^	5	–	0	12	–	1
No. 2 Mt. San Antonio ^	4	–	1	9	–	2
No. 9 Cerritos	3	–	2	8	–	3
No. 25 El Camino	2	–	3	5	–	6
Palomar	1	–	4	5	–	5
Chaffey	0	–	5	2	–	8
$ – Conference champion; ^ – CCCAA playoff participant; Rankings from CCCAA poll

2022 American Mountain League standings
	Conf.			Overall
Team	W		L	W		L
No. 23 Mt. San Jacinto $	5	–	0	9	–	2
Desert	4	–	1	8	–	3
Pasadena City	2	–	5	4	–	5
Grossmont	2	–	3	4	–	6
Victor Valley	2	–	3	4	–	6
Compton	0	–	5	3	–	7
$ – Conference champion; ^ – CCCAA playoff participant; Rankings from CCCAA poll

2022 National Northern League standings
	Conf.			Overall
Team	W		L	W		L
No. 10 Ventura +^	3	–	2	7	–	4
No. 16 Allan Hancock +	3	–	2	6	–	5
No. 20 College of the Canyons +	3	–	2	5	–	5
No. 24 East Los Angeles	2	–	3	5	–	6
No. 21 Long Beach City	2	–	3	5	–	6
Bakersfield	2	–	3	4	–	6
+ – Conference co-champions; ^ – CCCAA playoff participant; Rankings from CCCAA poll

2022 American Pacific League standings
	Conf.			Overall
Team	W		L	W		L
Santa Barbara City $	5	–	0	10	–	1
Moorpark	4	–	1	6	–	5
Antelope Valley	3	–	2	5	–	5
Los Angeles Valley	2	–	3	3	–	7
Santa Monica	1	–	4	2	–	8
Pierce	0	–	5	0	–	10
$ – Conference champion

2022 National Southern League standings
	Conf.			Overall
Team	W		L	W		L
No. 4 Fullerton $^	5	–	0	10	–	2
No. 6 Golden West	4	–	1	9	–	2
No. 14 San Diego Mesa	3	–	2	7	–	4
Saddleback	2	–	3	3	–	7
Southwestern (CA)	1	–	4	1	–	9
San Bernardino Valley	0	–	5	0	–	10
$ – Conference champion; ^ – CCCAA playoff participant; Rankings from CCCAA poll

==== NCFC ====
2022 National Bay 6 League standings
	Conf.			Overall
Team	W		L	W		L
No. 3 San Mateo +^	4	–	1	12	–	1
No. 5 Laney +^	4	–	1	8	–	3
No. 12 Diablo Valley	3	–	2	7	–	4
No. 11 CC of San Francisco	3	–	2	7	–	4
Chabot	1	–	4	2	–	8
San Joaquin Delta	0	–	5	1	–	9
+ – Conference co-champions; ^ – CCCAA playoff participant; Rankings from CCCAA poll

2022 American Golden Coast League standings
	Conf.			Overall
Team	W		L	W		L
Merced +	5	–	1	8	–	3
Monterey Peninsula +	5	–	1	7	–	4
West Hills Coalinga +	5	–	1	6	–	5
San Jose City	3	–	3	5	–	5
Hartnell	2	–	4	3	–	7
Cabrillo	1	–	5	2	–	8
Gavilan	0	–	6	1	–	9
+ – Conference co-champions

2022 National Norcal League standings
	Conf.			Overall
Team	W		L	W		L
No. 8 American River $^	5	–	0	8	–	4
No. 7 Butte	4	–	1	7	–	4
No. 15 Sierra	2	–	3	6	–	5
Santa Rosa	2	–	3	4	–	6
Shasta	2	–	3	4	–	6
College of the Siskiyous	0	–	5	1	–	9
$ – Conference champion; ^ – CCCAA playoff participant; Rankings from CCCAA poll

2022 American Pacific 7 League standings
	Conf.			Overall
Team	W		L	W		L
No. 18 Feather River $	5	–	0	11	–	0
College of the Redwoods	4	–	1	7	–	4
Los Medanos	3	–	2	5	–	5
Foothill	2	–	3	8	–	3
De Anza	1	–	4	5	–	5
Yuba	0	–	5	0	–	10
$ – Conference champion; Rankings from CCCAA poll

2022 National Valley League standings
	Conf.			Overall
Team	W		L	W		L
No. 13 Fresno City +	4	–	1	7	–	4
No. 19 Modesto +^	4	–	1	5	–	6
No. 22 College of the Sequoias	3	–	2	6	–	5
Reedley	2	–	3	5	–	5
Contra Costa	2	–	3	4	–	6
Sacramento City	0	–	5	3	–	7
+ – Conference co-champions; ^ – CCCAA playoff participant; Rankings from CCCAA poll

== Postseason ==
=== Playoffs ===
==== NJCAA Division I ====
Semifinals; December 3/4; Campus sites
1	Hutchinson	38
4	Coffeyville	7
2	Northwest Mississippi	12
3	Iowa Western	33

Championship game December 14; War Memorial Stadium—Little Rock, AR
1	Hutchinson	0
3	Iowa Western	31

==== CCCAA ====
===== SCFA playoffs =====
Semifinals; November 26; Campus sites
1	Riverside City	47
4	Ventura	32
2	Fullerton	24
3	Mt. San Antonio	41

Regional finals December 3 Campus sites
1	Riverside City	31
2	Fullerton	17

===== NCFC playoffs =====
Semifinals; November 26; Campus sites
1	San Mateo	30
4	Modesto	0
2	Laney	21
3	American River	43

Regional finals December 3 Campus sites
1	San Mateo	30
3	American River	5

===== State championship =====
Championship game December 10; College Heights Stadium—San Mateo, CA
1	Riverside City	0
1	San Mateo	55

=== Bowl games ===
CCCAA and NJCAA had a combined fourteen bowl games, featuring teams that did not qualify for either league's postseason tournament.

Date	Time (EST)	Game	Site	Teams	Results
Nov 26	12:00 p.m.	Patriotic Bowl	Campus sites	Golden West (8–2) East Los Angeles (5–5)	Golden West 32; East Los Angeles 14
Nov 26	12:00 p.m.	American Division Championship Bowl	Campus sites	Citrus (10–0); Mt. San Jacinto (9–1)	Citrus 31 Mt. San Jacinto 20
Nov 26	1:00 p.m.	Western State Bowl	Campus sites	Cerritos (7–2); Long Beach City (5–5)	Cerritos 35 Long Beach City 28
Nov 26	1:00 p.m.	American Championship Bowl	Campus sites	Feather River (10–0) Merced (8–2)	Feather River 50 Merced 32
Nov 26	2:30 p.m.	Beach Bowl	Campus sites	Santa Barbara City (9–1) Desert (8–2)	Santa Barbara City 44 Desert 23
Nov 26	6:00 p.m.	SoCal Bowl	Campus sites	San Diego Mesa (6–4); El Camino (5–5)	San Diego Mesa 21; El Camino 20
Nov 26	6:00 p.m.	Strawberry Bowl	Campus sites	Allan Hancock (5–5) Moorpark (6–4)	Allan Hancock 20 Moorpark 17
Dec 3	12:00 p.m.	Golden State Bowl	Campus sites	Monterey Peninsula (7–3) College of the Redwoods (7–3)	Monterey Peninsula 42 College of the Redwoods 21
Dec 3	12:30 p.m.	Northern California Bowl	Campus sites	Foothill (7–3) West Hills Coalinga (6–4)	Foothill 48 West Hill Coalinga 20
Dec 3	1:00 p.m.	Silicon Valley Bowl	Campus sites	Diablo Valley (6–4) Sierra (6–4)	Diablo Valley 36 Sierra 28
Dec 3	1:00 p.m.	Gridiron Classic Bowl	Campus sites	CC of San Francisco (6–4) College of the Sequoias (6–4)	CC of San Francisco 34 College of the Sequoias 24
Dec 3	1:00 p.m.	Grizzly Bowl	Redwood Bowl (Arcata, California)	Fresno City (6–4) Butte (7–3)	Fresno City 13 Butte 10
Dec 3	1:00 p.m.	C.H.A.M.P.S. Heart of Texas Bowl	Campus sites	Butler (KS) (7–4) Kilgore (8–3)	Butler (KS) 28 Kilgore 24
Dec 4	12:00 p.m.	Game One Bowl	UNI-Dome (Cedar Falls, Iowa)	Iowa Central (6–4) Trinity Valley (8–2)	Iowa Central 31 Trinity Valley 24

== See also ==
- 2022 NCAA Division I FBS football season
- 2022 NCAA Division I FCS football season
- 2022 NCAA Division II football season
- 2022 NCAA Division III football season
- 2022 NAIA football season
- 2022 U Sports football season
