= 2022 college football season =

2022 college football season may refer to:

== American leagues ==
- 2022 NCAA Division I FBS football season
- 2022 NCAA Division I FCS football season
- 2022 NCAA Division II football season
- 2022 NCAA Division III football season
- 2022 NAIA football season
- 2022 junior college football season

== Non-American leagues ==
- 2022 U Sports football season
