= 2022 Iowa Western Reivers football team =

American college football season

2022 Iowa Western Reivers football

NJCAA Division I champion ICCAC champion

NJCAA Division I championship game, W 31–0 vs. Hutchinson
- Conference: Iowa Community College Athletic Conference
- Record: 10–2 (2–0 ICCAC)
- Head coach: Scott Strohmeier (14th season)
- Offensive coordinator: Tristan Speer (1st season)
- Defensive coordinator: Mike Blackbourn (14th season)
- Home stadium: Titan Stadium

2022 Iowa Community College Athletic Conference football standings
	Conf.			Overall
Team	W		L	W		L
No. 1 Iowa Western $^	2	–	0	10	–	2
No. 10 Iowa Central	1	–	1	7	–	4
Ellsworth	0	–	2	0	–	10
$ – Conference champion; ^ – NJCAA Division I playoff participant; Rankings from NJCAA Division I poll

The 2022 Iowa Western Reivers football team was an American football team that represented Iowa Western Community College as a member of the Iowa Community College Athletic Conference (ICCAC) during the 2022 junior college football season. In their 13th year under head coach Scott Strohmeier, the Reivers compiled a 10–2 record, defeated Hutchinson in the National Junior College Athletic Association (NJCAA) championship game, and won the NJCAA National Football Championship. It was Iowa Western's first of two consecutive national championships.

The team's statistical leaders included Aiden Nidens with 1,073 passing yards, Bryant Williams with 749 rushing yards, LJ Fitzpatrick with 540 receiving yards, and Sam Wilber with 72 points scored (36 extra points, 12 field goals).

== Schedule ==
Date	Opponent	Site	Result	Attendance	Source
August 27	Dodge City*	Titan Stadium; Council Bluffs, IA	W 46–0	1,400	
September 10	Garden City*	Titan Stadium; Council Bluffs, IA	W 43–13	1,600	
September 17	at Highland (KS)*	Kessinger Field; Highland, KS	W 24–7	1,000	
September 24	Ellsworth	Titan Stadium; Council Bluffs, IA	W 52–0	1,350	
October 1	at Independence**	Emmot Field; Independence, KS	W 17–8	850	
October 8	Snow*	Titan Stadium; Council Bluffs, IA	W 26–0	2,150	
October 22	Butler (KS)*	Titan Stadium; Council Bluffs, IA	W 33–14	2,250	
October 29	at Iowa Central	Dodger Stadium; Fort Dodge, IA	W 35–21	1,500	
November 5	at Coffeyville*	Memorial Stadium; Coffeyville, KS	L 7–23	1,000	
November 12	Hutchinson*	Titan Stadium; Council Bluffs, IA	L 28–29	2,500	
December 4	at Northwest Mississippi*	Ranger Stadium at Bobby Franklin Field; Senatobia, MS (NJCAA Division I semifinal)	W 33–12	1,034	
December 14	vs. Hutchinson*	War Memorial Stadium; Little Rock, AR (NJCAA Division I championship game)	W 31–0	2,000	
*Non-conference game
