= George Sekul =

American football coach (born c. 1969)

Biographical details
- Born: October 5, 1937; Biloxi, Mississippi, U.S.
- Died: January 4, 2021 (aged 83); D'Iberville, Mississippi, U.S.
- Education: Perkinston Junior College (1957); Mississippi Southern College (1959, 1961)

Playing career

Football
- 1955–1956: Perkinston
- 1957–1959: Mississippi Southern
- Positions: Quarterback, punter, kick returner, defensive back

Coaching career (HC unless noted)

Football
- 1960: Mississippi Southern (freshman)
- 1961–1965: Perkinston (backfield)
- 1966–1991: Mississippi Gulf Coast

Track and field
- 1962–1992: Perkinston / Mississippi Gulf Coast

Head coaching record
- Overall: 201–80–5 (football)
- Tournaments: 2–0 (NJCAA playoffs); 12–4–1 (MACJC playoffs)

Accomplishments and honors

Championships
- 2 NJCAA National (1971, 1984); 8 MACJC (1966–1967, 1971, 1974, 1980, 1982, 1984, 1986); 8 MACJC South Division (1971, 1974–1975, 1980, 1982–1985)

Awards
- All-MACJC (1956)

Stephen George Sekul (October 5, 1937 – January 4, 2021) was an American junior college football coach. He was the head football coach for Mississippi Gulf Coast Community College from 1966 to 1991, winning national championships in 1971 and 1984. He played college football for Perkinston and Mississippi Southern primarily as a quarterback.

== Head coaching record ==
=== Football ===
| Year | Team | Overall | Conference | Standing | Bowl/playoffs |
|---|---|---|---|---|---|
Mississippi Gulf Coast Bulldogs (Mississippi Association of Community and Junior Colleges) (1966–1991)
| 1966 | Mississippi Gulf Coast | 10–2 | 8–2 | 1st | |
| 1967 | Mississippi Gulf Coast | 9–2 | 9–1 | 1st | |
| 1968 | Mississippi Gulf Coast | 9–1 | 8–1 | 2nd | |
| 1969 | Mississippi Gulf Coast | 7–4 | 6–4 | 6th | |
| 1970 | Mississippi Gulf Coast | 9–2–1 | 3–1–1 | T–2nd (South) | |
| 1971 | Mississippi Gulf Coast | 11–0 | 5–0 | 1st (South) | W MACJC championship, W Shrine Bowl |
| 1972 | Mississippi Gulf Coast | 8–2 | 7–2 | (South) | |
| 1973 | Mississippi Gulf Coast | 9–1 | 7–1 | (South) | |
| 1974 | Mississippi Gulf Coast | 6–5 | 5–5 | 1st (South) | W MACJC championship |
| 1975 | Mississippi Gulf Coast | 10–2 | 10–1 | 1st (South) | L MACJC championship |
| 1976 | Mississippi Gulf Coast | 6–3–1 | 6–3–1 | (South) | |
| 1977 | Mississippi Gulf Coast | 7–2–1 | 7–2–1 | (South) | |
| 1978 | Mississippi Gulf Coast | 9–1 | 9–1 | (South) | |
| 1979 | Mississippi Gulf Coast | 7–5 | 6–4 | (South) | L MACJC championship |
| 1980 | Mississippi Gulf Coast | 11–1 | 9–1 | 1st (South) | W MACJC championship |
| 1981 | Mississippi Gulf Coast | 6–4 | 6–4 | (South) | |
| 1982 | Mississippi Gulf Coast | 10–1–1 | 9–0–1 | 1st (South) | T MACJC championship |
| 1983 | Mississippi Gulf Coast | 10–2 | 9–1 | 1st (South) | L MACJC championship |
| 1984 | Mississippi Gulf Coast | 13–0 | 10–0 | 1st (South) | W MACJC championship, W NJCAA Championship |
| 1985 | Mississippi Gulf Coast | 9–3 | 8–1 | 1st (South) | L MACJC championship, L Texas Junior College Bowl |
| 1986 | Mississippi Gulf Coast | 10–3 | 7–3 | (South) | W MACJC championship, W East Bowl |
| 1987 | Mississippi Gulf Coast | 2–8 | 2–8 | (South) | |
| 1988 | Mississippi Gulf Coast | 5–5 | 5–5 | (South) | |
| 1989 | Mississippi Gulf Coast | 2–8 | 2–8 | (South) | |
| 1990 | Mississippi Gulf Coast | 1–8–1 | 1–8–1 | (South) | |
| 1991 | Mississippi Gulf Coast | 5–5 | 5–5 | (South) | |
| Mississippi Gulf Coast: | | 201–80–5 | (Note: Only divisional games counted towards standings, conference records listed above are from all conference games.) | | |
| Total: | | 201–80–5 | | | |
National championship Conference title Conference division title or championship game berth
