= Lloyd Sisco =

American football coach (born 1941)

Biographical details
- Born: July 17, 1941 (age 85)
- Education: Buena Vista University

Coaching career (HC unless noted)
- 1968–1981: Waco HS (IA)
- 1983–1990: Ellsworth
- 1991–1993: Livingston

Head coaching record
- Overall: 13–16–1 (college); 68–14–1 (junior college); 184–63–2 (high school)
- Bowls: 7–1 (junior college)

Accomplishments and honors

Championships
- 1 NJCAA National (1987); 6 Iowa Juco (1983–1984, 1987–1990)

Lloyd Sisco (born July 16, 1941) is an American former football coach. From 1968 through 1981, Sisco served as head coach at Waco High School in Olds, Iowa where he compiled an overall record of 121–15 during his 14-year tenure with the Warriors. He then moved on to serve as the head football coach at Ellsworth Community College, where he won the NJCAA National Football Championship in 1987 and compiled an overall record of 68–14–1 during his eight-year tenure. After leaving Ellsworth, Sisco served as the head football coach at the Livingston State College—now known as the University of West Alabama—from 1991 to 1993.

== Head coaching record ==
=== College ===
Year	Team	Overall	Conference	Standing	Bowl/playoffs
Livingston Tigers (Gulf South Conference) (1991–1993)
1991	Livingston	6–5	2–4	T–4th	
1992	Livingston	5–4	2–4	T–5th	
1993	Livingston	2–7–1	1–5–1	6th	
Livingston:		13–16–1	5–13–1		
Total:		13–16–1			

=== Junior college ===
Year	Team	Overall	Conference	Standing	Bowl/playoffs	NJCAA^{#}
Ellsworth Panthers (Iowa Junior College Conference) (1983–1990)
1983	Ellsworth	10–1	6–0	1st	W Like Cola Bowl	3
1984	Ellsworth	9–2	4–0	1st	W Like Cola Bowl	10
1985	Ellsworth	7–4	4–2	2nd	W Like Cola Bowl	
1986	Ellsworth	6–4	3–1	2nd	W RC Cola Bowl	3
1987	Ellsworth	10–0	4–0	1st	W RC Cola Bowl	1
1988	Ellsworth	10–1	4–0	1st	W RC Cola Bowl	3
1989	Ellsworth	9–1	5–0	1st	L Mid-America Bowl	2
1990	Ellsworth	7–1–1	5–0	1st	W RC Cola Bowl	8
Ellsworth:		68–14–1	35–3			
Total:		68–14–1				
National championship Conference title Conference division title or championship game berth
