= Sekul =

Sekul is a surname. Notable people with the surname include:

- George Sekul (1937–2021), American junior college football coach
- Marko Matijević Sekul (born 1987), Croatian musician, songwriter, and music producer

== See also ==
- Sekul, the German name for Secu village, Reșița, Romania
