= Esther J. Walls =

American librarian (1926–2008)

- Walls in 1972
- Born: Esther Jean Walls; May 1, 1926; Mason City, Iowa, U.S.
- Died: February 25, 2008 (aged 81); New York, New York, U.S.
- Education: Mason City High SchoolNorth Iowa Area Community College; University of Iowa; Columbia University
- Occupation: Librarian
- Years active: 1951-1988

Esther Walls (May 1, 1926 – February 25, 2008) was an African American librarian and an international advocate for literacy. She is known for her work in the New York Public Library and with the Franklin Book Programs advocating for literacy in developing nations around the world.

== Biography ==
Esther Jean Walls was born and raised in Mason City, Iowa. She graduated in 1944 as Valedictorian of Mason City High School, attending Mason City Junior College and the University of Iowa, graduating in 1948 summa cum laude with a Bachelor of Arts degree in Romance languages. She was the first African American woman elected to the Alpha of Iowa chapter of Phi Beta Kappa and one of the first women to integrate Currier Hall. After graduation, she worked in the Mason City Public Library before attending Columbia University and graduated in 1951 with a Master of Science degree in Library Science.

She began her professional career in the New York Public Library as a young adult librarian, introducing the library services to vocational students. In 1958 she studied high school students’ reference needs. She became the head of Clason’s Point Branch in the Bronx and Head Librarian of the Countee Cullen Branch in Harlem. During her time at these branches she focused lectures and programs to interact with the Black community and its needs. She was appointed Director of the North Manhattan Project, a library expansion in several Harlem branches to serve disadvantaged communities. At the time of her departure with the New York Public Library, she was the highest ranking African American in the system.

Walls first traveled to Africa in 1959 visiting Ghana, Nigeria and Togo in a total of 25 visits. In 1965 she resigned her position at the Countee Cullen Library and accepted a position with Franklin Book Programs to stimulate book and library programs in developing countries. During that time, she traveled throughout Africa, Latin America and Asia promoting literacy and libraries. She served in this role in an official capacity until 1971, continuing as special consultant on Africa and representing Franklin at government conferences and industry seminars.

Walls was appointed director of U.S. Secretariat to promote UNESCO’s International Year of the Book. The goal of this program was to focus attention of the general public, governments, international and domestic organizations on the role of books and related materials in the lives and affairs of the individual and society.

- She was appointed head of the Teachers Central Laboratory at Hunter College in New York City in 1973.
- From 1975-1979 she served as chairperson of the President’s Equal Employment Opportunity Commission.
- She has served as Chair of Young Adult Library Services Association, American Library Association; Chair of International Relations Committee, American Library Association;
- She has served as commissioner and member of the executive board of the U.S. National Commission for UNESCO; U.S. Committee for UNICEF.
- She served as Associate Director of Libraries for State University of New York at Stony Brook from 1974 until her retirement in 1988.
- She became a continuing life member of ALA in 1988.

Walls died in New York City, aged 81 after a heart attack. There was a memorial in New York City. Walls is buried at Elmwood-St. Joseph Municipal Cemetery in Mason City.
