= Dennis Eckhoff =

American football player and coach (1945–1995)

Biographical details
- Born: May 23, 1945; Charles City, Iowa, U.S.
- Died: October 6, 1995 (aged 50); Humboldt, Iowa, U.S.

Playing career
- 1964: North Iowa Area
- 1965–1967: Westmar

Coaching career (HC unless noted)
- 1974–1980: West Union HS (IA)
- 1983: New Mexico Highlands

Head coaching record
- Overall: 1–9 (college)

Dennis John Eckhoff (May 23, 1945 – October 6, 1995) was an American football player and coach. He served as the head football coach at New Mexico Highlands University in Las Vegas, New Mexico in 1983, compiling a record of 1–9. Eckhoff played college football at North Iowa Area Community College (then known as Mason City Junior College) in 1964 before graduating from Westmar University in Le Mars, Iowa in 1967.

== Head coaching record ==
=== College ===
Year	Team	Overall	Conference	Standing	Bowl/playoffs
New Mexico Highlands Cowboys (Rocky Mountain Athletic Conference) (1983)
1983	New Mexico Highlands	1–9	0–8	9th	
New Mexico Highlands:		1–9	0–8		
Total:		1–9			
