= Iowa Western Community College =

Public college in Council Bluffs, Iowa, US

Coordinates: 41°16′28″N 95°48′01″W

- Motto: The world is waiting...
- Type: Public community college
- Established: 1966; 60 years ago
- Affiliations: NJCAA
- President: Daniel P. Kinney
- Students: 42,795
- Location: Council Bluffs, Iowa, U.S.
- Campus: Suburban
- Colors: Royal Blue and White
- Nickname: Reivers
- Sporting affiliations: NJCAA
- Mascot: Rocky The Reiver
- Website: www.iwcc.edu
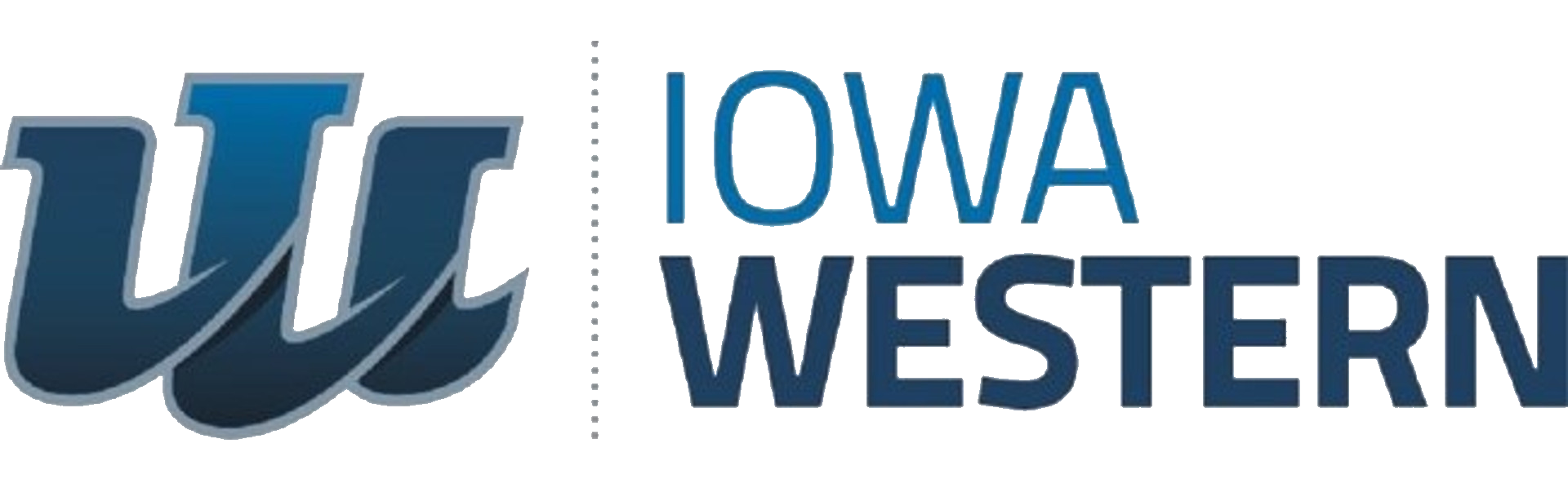

Iowa Western Community College is a public community college in Council Bluffs, Iowa, United States. The college was founded in 1966 and offers 84 programs in both vocational and technical areas as well as in liberal arts. It is also home to a flight school.

== History ==
Iowa Western Community College was originally announced in December 1965 as an un-named four year liberal arts college, to be located in North Council Bluffs. The college began operations in 1966 as Area 13 Community College. Area 13 opened with campuses in Council Bluffs and Clarinda. In November 1966, the Area 13 Community College board officially changed the name of the school to Iowa Western Community College.

== Campus ==
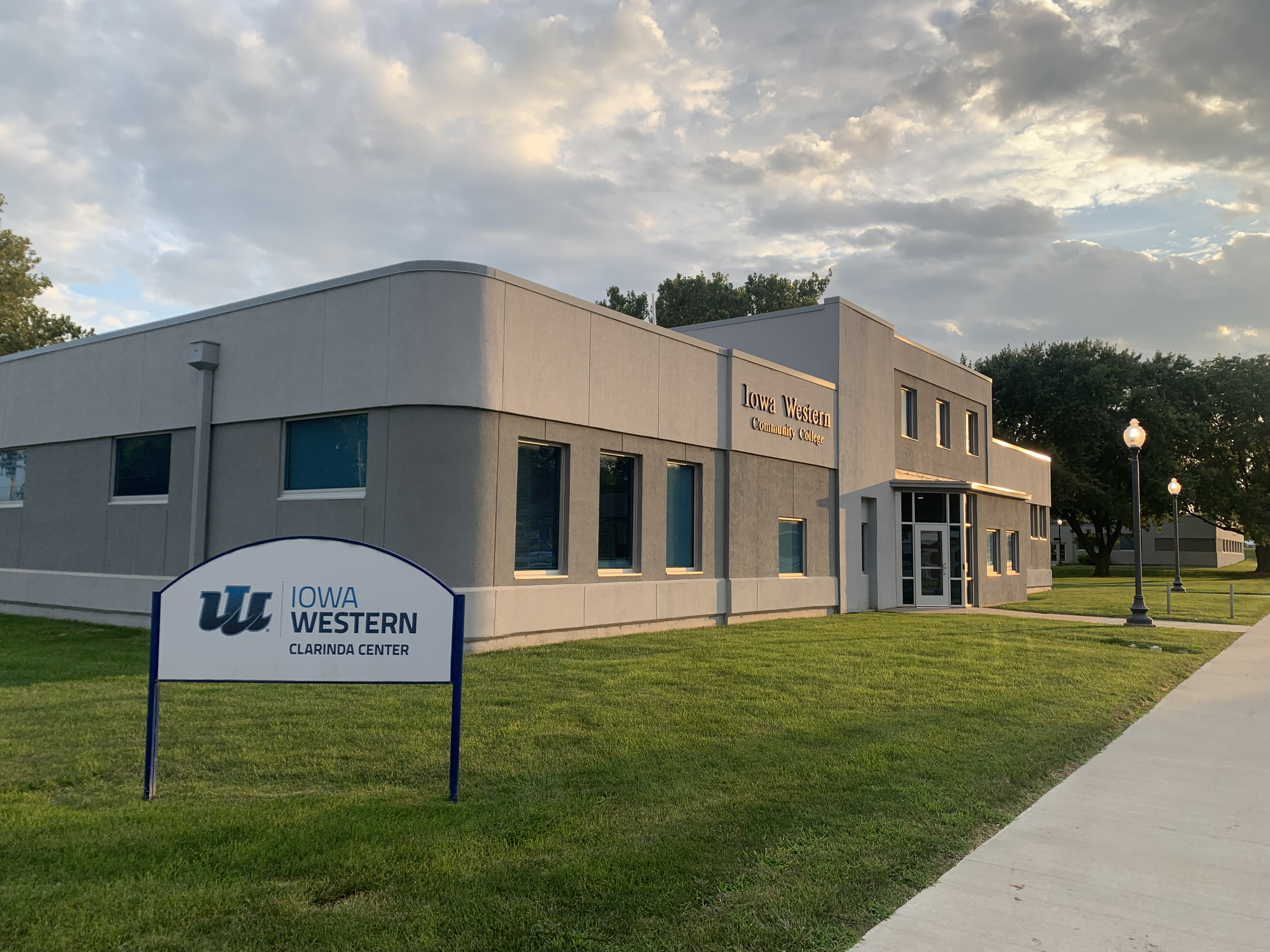
Iowa Western Community College campus in Clarinda

Iowa Western Community College's main campus is located in Council Bluffs. The college also has Arts and Sciences courses in Clarinda, Cass County, Fremont County, and Shelby County. The Clarinda and Shelby County centers also house the nursing program.

== Academics ==
Undergraduate demographics as of 2025
Race and ethnicity	Total
White	60%
Hispanic	12%
Native American	1%
Asian	1%
Two or more races	4%
Black	15%
International student	4%
Unknown	3%
Economic diversity
Low-income (Note: The percentage of students who received an income-based federal Pell grant intended for low-income students.)	47%
Affluent (Note: The percentage of students who are a part of the American middle class at the bare minimum.)	53%

Iowa Western Community College is accredited by the Higher Learning Commission (HLC). As of 2025, the college has 3,020 students. The college has 61 undergraduate fields of study. Major fields of study include Liberal Arts and Sciences, Practical Nursing, Registered Nursing, Precision Metal Working, and Vehicle Maintenance and Repair Technologies.

== Student life ==
IWCC hosts college/alternative radio station 89.7 The River, which serves the entire Omaha metropolitan area. IWCC offers Air Force ROTC through a cross-town agreement with the University of Nebraska-Omaha, the site of the ROTC classes.

== Athletics ==
Iowa Western's sports teams are nicknamed the Reivers. Men's sports include baseball, basketball, soccer, wrestling, cross country, golf, shotgun sports, swimming, track & field, bowling and football. Women's sports include basketball, softball, soccer, bowling, cross country, golf, shotgun sports, swimming, track & field, and volleyball. Co-ed sports include cross country, track & field, cheerleading and golf. Reiver athletics also include cheerleading and a dance team.

Iowa Western competes in Division I of the National Junior College Athletic Association (NJCAA) and the Iowa Community College Athletic Conference (ICCAC). Combined, Iowa Western men's and women's athletic teams have 18 NJCAA National Championships between them. The men's National Championships were in football (2012, 2022, 2023), baseball (2010, 2012, 2014), and soccer (2013 & 2021). The women's National Championships were in volleyball (2006, 2020–21, 2021), soccer (2013, 2022, & 2023), and track & field (2021 indoor, 2022 indoor and outdoor, and 2024 indoor). In addition to the NJCAA National Championships, the cheerleading squad won the 2016 World University Championships and the 2023 UCA College Cheerleading National Championship and World University Championship, and 2024 World University Championship and the shotgun sports team won the 2022 ACUI Division 4 national championship, the 2023 NCSSAA Division 5 national championship, and the 2024 ACUI Division 4 national championship. The Competitive Dance Team has won three national championships, the 2023 Open Pom and the 2024 Jazz & Hip-Hop titles.

== Notable people ==
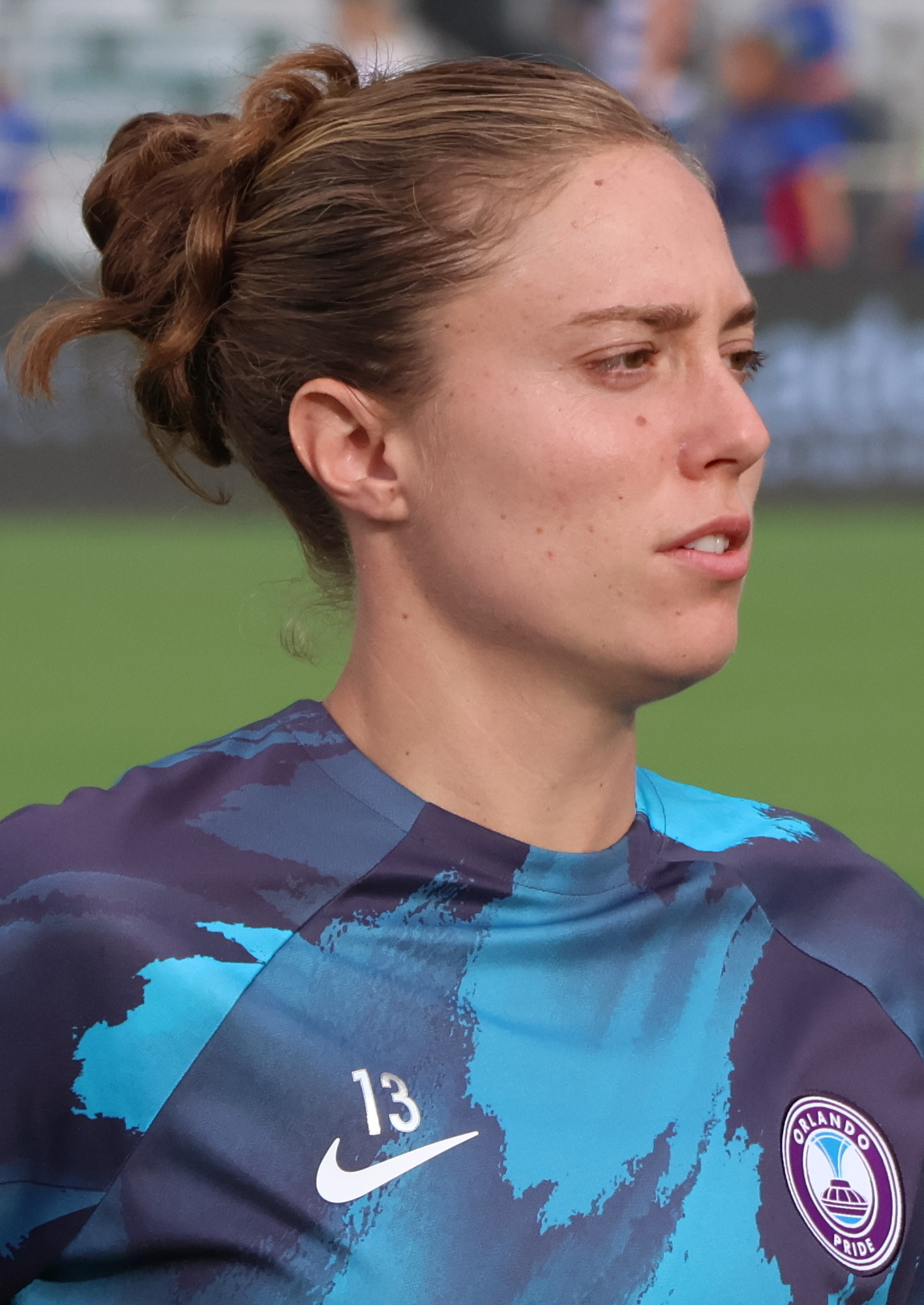
Celia Jiménez

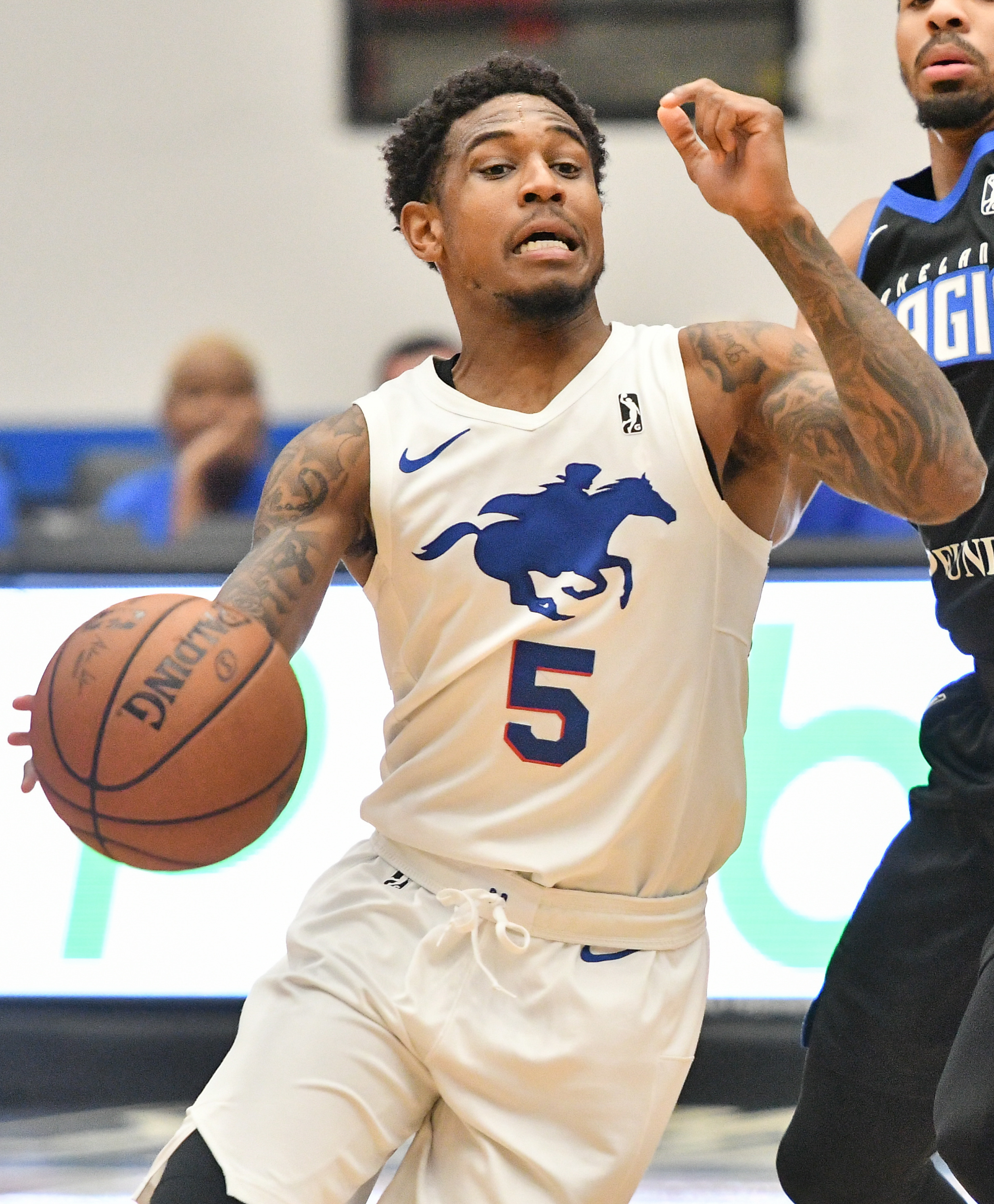
Xavier Munford

- Geronimo Allison, professional football player
- Moïse Bombito, Canadian professional soccer player
- Ron Boone, professional basketball player and announcer
- Mark Brandenburg, politician
- Nick Easley, professional football player
- Greg Forristall, politician
- Don Jackson, professional football player
- Celia Jiménez , Spanish professional soccer player
- Isaiah Johnson, professional football player
- Derwin Kitchen, professional basketball player
- Darrick Minner, professional MMA fighter
- Xavier Munford, professional basketball player
- Michael S. Sanchez, attorney and politician
- Tom Shipley, politician
- Erik Swanson, professional baseball pitcher
- Andrew Van Ginkel, professional football player
- Jake Waters, professional football player and college football coach
- Kaden Wetjen, professional football player
- Perrion Winfrey, professional football player
- Keaton Winn, professional baseball pitcher
