= 1971 Mississippi Gulf Coast Bulldogs football team =

American college football season

1971 Mississippi Gulf Coast Bulldogs football

Junior college national champion MJCC champion MJCC South Division champion Shrine Bowl champion

MJCC championship game, W 26–14 vs. Mississippi Delta

Shrine Bowl, W 22–13 vs. Fort Scott
- Conference: Mississippi Junior College Conference
- South Division
- Record: 11–0 (5–0 MJCC)
- Head coach: George Sekul (6th season)
- Home stadium: A. L. May Memorial Stadium

1971 Mississippi Junior College Conference football standings
| | Conf. | | | | | Overall |
| Team | W | | L | | T | W | | L | | T |
|---|---|---|---|---|---|---|---|---|---|---|
North Division
| Mississippi Delta xy | 5 | – | 0 | – | 1 | 6 | – | 3 | – | 1 |
| East Central (MS) | 5 | – | 1 | – | 0 | 7 | – | 3 | – | 0 |
| Northwest Mississippi | 4 | – | 2 | – | 0 | 5 | – | 5 | – | 0 |
| Itawamba | 3 | – | 2 | – | 1 | 5 | – | 4 | – | 1 |
| East Mississippi | 2 | – | 4 | – | 0 | 3 | – | 7 | – | 0 |
| Holmes | 1 | – | 6 | – | 0 | 1 | – | 9 | – | 0 |
| Northeast Mississippi | 0 | – | 6 | – | 0 | 0 | – | 10 | – | 0 |
South Division
| Mississippi Gulf Coast xy$ | 5 | – | 0 | – | 0 | 11 | – | 0 | – | 0 |
| Pearl River | 4 | – | 1 | – | 0 | 9 | – | 1 | – | 0 |
| Jones County | 3 | – | 2 | – | 0 | 6 | – | 4 | – | 0 |
| Copiah–Lincoln | 2 | – | 3 | – | 0 | 7 | – | 3 | – | 0 |
| Southwest Mississippi | 1 | – | 4 | – | 0 | 2 | – | 7 | – | 0 |
| Hinds | 0 | – | 5 | – | 0 | 2 | – | 7 | – | 0 |
Championship: Mississippi Gulf Coast 26, Mississippi Delta 14
$ – Conference champion; x – Division champion/co-champions

The 1971 Mississippi Gulf Coast Bulldogs football team was an American football team that represented Mississippi Gulf Coast Junior College as a member of the Mississippi Junior College Conference (MJCC) during the 1971 junior college football season. Led by sixth-year head coach George Sekul, the Bulldogs compiled a perfect 11–0 record, won the MJCC championship, outscored opponents by a total of 365 to 146, and were selected as the junior college national champion in the final JC Gridwire poll of 1971. Mississippi Gulf Coast won the MJCC's South Division title with a record of 5–0, and beat Mississippi Delta in the conference title game.

Key players included quarterback James "Dinky" McKay and halfback Rikki Autumn.

== Schedule ==
| Date | Opponent | Site | Result | Attendance | Source |
|---|---|---|---|---|---|
| September 4 | Itawamba* | Perkinston, MS | W 28–21 | | |
| September 11 | at Copiah–Lincoln | Wesson, MS | W 30–7 | | |
| September 18 | Jones County | Perkinston, MS | W 27–8 | | |
| September 25 | vs. Pearl River | Biloxi Memorial Stadium; Biloxi, MS | W 37–21 | | |
| October 2 | vs. East Central (MS)* | War Memorial Stadium; Pascagoula, MS | W 28–27 | | |
| October 7 | at Holmes* | Goodman, MS | W 36–7 | | |
| October 16 | at East Mississippi* | Scooba, MS | W 33–13 | | |
| October 28 | at Southwest Mississippi | Summit, MS | W 36–8 | | |
| November 6 | Hinds | A. L. May Memorial Stadium; Perkinston, MS | W 62–7 | | |
| November 20 | vs. Mississippi Delta* | Biloxi Memorial Stadium; Biloxi, MS (MJCC championship game) | W 26–14 | | |
| December 3 | vs. Fort Scott* | Savannah, GA (Shrine Bowl) | W 22–13 | 4,000 | |
*Non-conference game
