= North Iowa Area Community College =

Public college in Mason City, Iowa, US

- Former name: Mason City Junior College (1918–1965)
- Type: Public community college
- Established: 1918; 108 years ago
- Accreditation: Higher Learning Commission
- Academic affiliations: American Association of Community Colleges
- Endowment: $53.1 million (2025)
- President: Joel Pedersen
- Students: 3,317 (fall 2024)
- Location: Mason City, Iowa, U.S.
- Campus: Rural
- Colors: Blue & gold
- Nickname: Trojans
- Sporting affiliations: NCAA NJCAA - ICCAC
- Website: www.niacc.edu

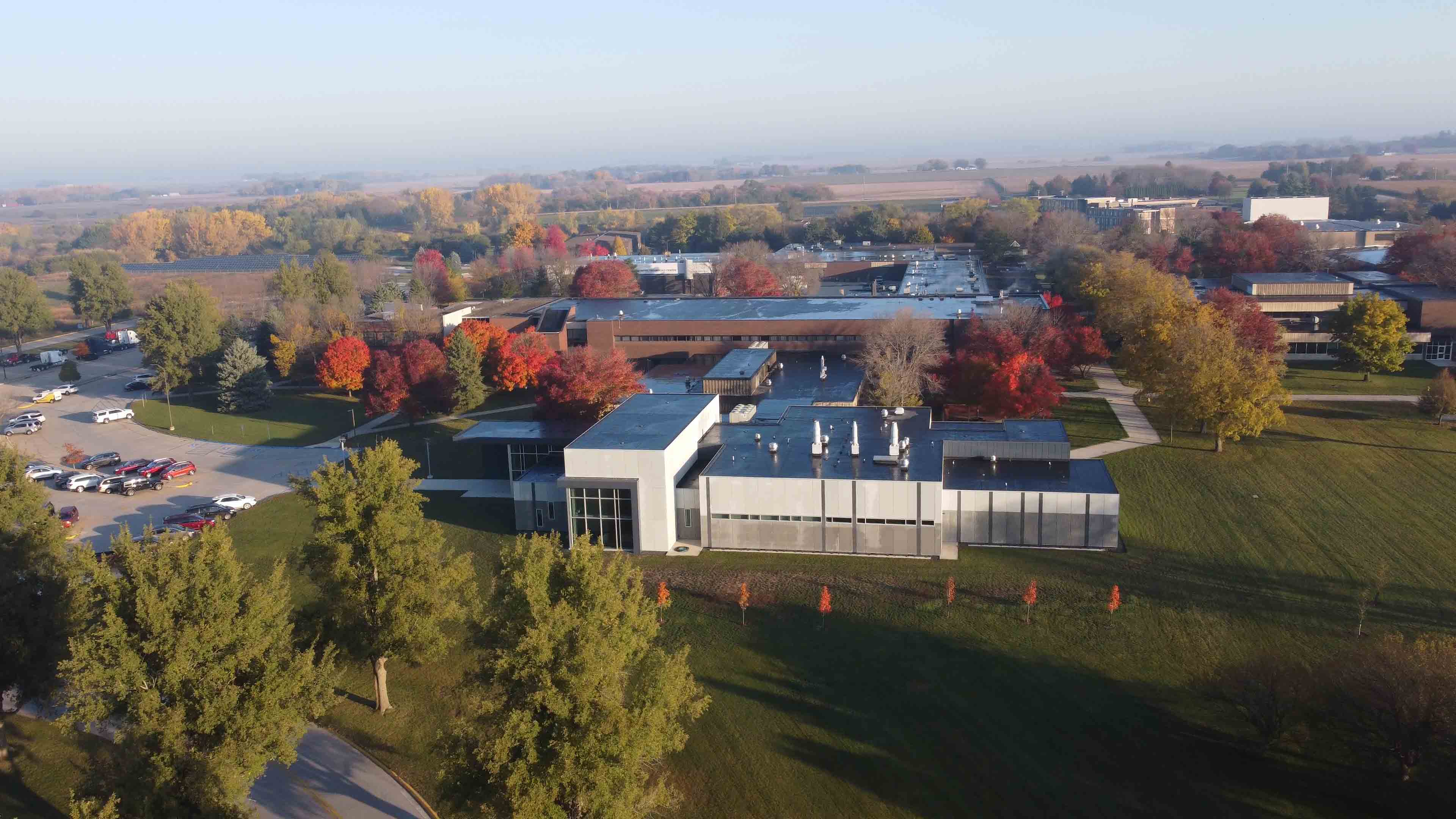
Campus Aerial View (looking north)

North Iowa Area Community College, also called NIACC (English pronunciation: /ˈnaɪæk/) is a public community college located in Mason City, Iowa. NIACC serves the general public and a geographical area covering 11 north-central Iowa counties, including the cities of Mason City, Forest City, Charles City, Hampton, and Clear Lake.

NIACC, the oldest community college in Iowa, holds the distinction of being the first public two-year junior college in the state. Other area communities served by the college include Osage, Garner, Northwood, Belmond, Lake Mills, Britt, St. Ansgar, and Greene.

== History ==
NIACC began as Mason City Junior College, the idea of which was first proposed at an April 1916 PTA meeting led by Mason City High School Principal F.M. Hammitt. Mason City Junior College opened September 9, 1918; becoming the first public two-year college in Iowa. The college was first located in the old downtown Mason City High School until 1953, when it moved to the former Memorial University Liberal Arts Building at Pennsylvania and 15th Street SE. Memorial University was founded in memory of American Civil War veterans. It first opened in 1902 and closed shortly after in 1910.

In 1965, Mason City Junior College was permitted by the Iowa General Assembly to transform into North Iowa Area Community College (Merged Area II). In 1970, the college moved to its current campus on the rural east edge of Mason City. In 2018, NIACC as in institution celebrated its 100th anniversary.

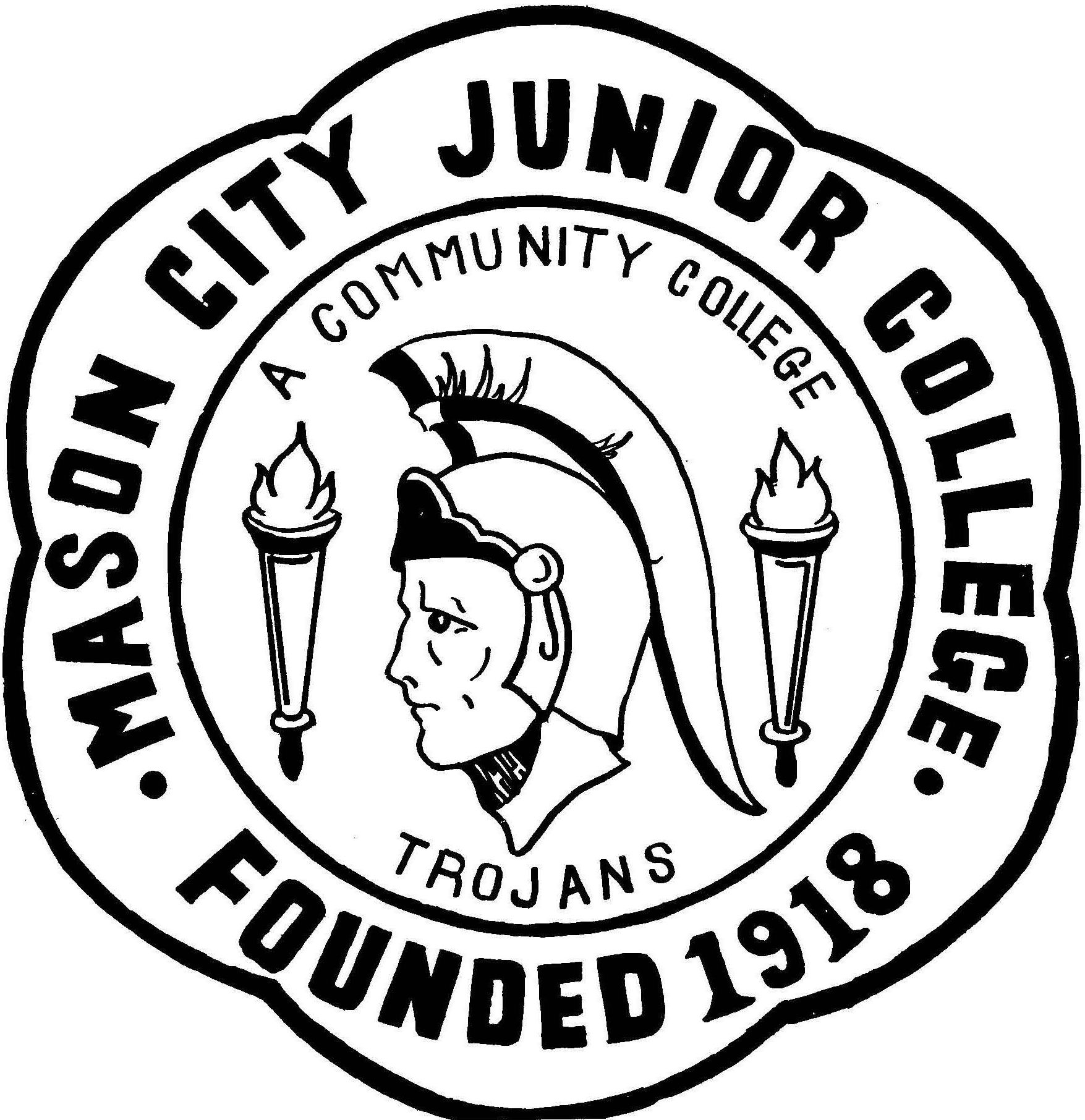
Official Seal of Mason City Junior College, active from 1918 to 1965

The Aspen Institute has consistently recognized North Iowa Area Community College as one of the top 150 community colleges in the United States for academic excellence. This recognition spans multiple years, including 2013, 2015, 2017, 2019, and 2024, and as a semi-finalist for the 2027 award cycle.

== Academics ==
NIACC is accredited by the Higher Learning Commission to administer associate degree programs.Those being, Associate of Arts, Associate of Science, Associate of Applied Science, and Associate in General Studies. Otherwise, diplomas are given for programs less than 30 semester hours.

College academic programs are divided into seven "meta majors" corresponding to career fields. Those being:

- Agriculture
- Business
- Health science
- Humanities
- Human and public services
- STEM
- Skilled trades

=== Community educational services ===
The main campus of North Iowa Area Community College is located on the eastern side of Mason City, Iowa. NIACC also has regional centers in Charles City, Forest City, Garner, Hampton, Lake Mills, and Osage. These centers provide general education courses, career training programs, continuing education classes as well as concurrent enrollment for area high-school students.

==== John Pappajohn Entrepreneurial Center ====
The John Pappajohn Entrepreneurial Center and its sister organization the North Iowa Small Business Development Center are located on NIACC's campus. Its namesake John Pappajohn was born in St. Luke's, Greece in 1928 and immigrated to Mason City, Iowa when he was nine months old. He attended the University of Iowa, and later became a Des Moines-based venture capitalist. In 1997, Pappajohn donated $25 million to establish John Pappajohn Entrepreneurial Centers at five Iowa-based higher education institutions. NIACC is home to the only center located on a community college campus, other centers are located at the University of Iowa, Iowa State University, the University of Northern Iowa, and Drake University.

The NIACC Pappajohn Center provides business counseling, star-up and expansion services, as well as financial advice to Iowa and North Iowa entrepreneurs. The adjoining North Iowa Area Small Business Development Center provides services to small-business in local counties, and is federally funded by the U.S. Small Business Administration.

== Administration ==
NIACC is governed by a nine-member Board of Directors, with each director representing a sector of the nine-county regional service area. Each director serves a four-year term, elected by voters in their corresponding districts.

NIACC Board of Directors for 2025-2027 term
Position	Name	City	County
Board President	Andy Julseth	Northwood	Worth
Board Vice-President	Dr. Stephanie Nettleton	Mason City	Cerro Gordo
Director	David Steffens Jr.	Lake Mills	Winnebago
Director	Kurt Herbrechtsmeyer	Charles City	Floyd
Director	Mark Paca	Clear Lake	Cerro Gordo
Director	John Rowe	Mason City	Cerro Gordo
Director	Willie Weis	Saint Ansgar	Mitchell
Director	Debra Hill	Garner	Hancock
Director	Nicki Prantner	Hampton	Franklin

=== Presidents ===
Since its reorganization from Mason City Junior College in 1965, NIACC has had seven presidents.

- William Berner, 1966-1970
- David Pierce, 1970-1981
- David Buettner, 1981-2001
- Mike Morrison, 2001-2008
- Deb Derr, 2008-2013
- Steve Schulz, 2013-2024
- Joel Pedersen, 2024-Present

== Student life ==
North Iowa Area Community College offers over 20 clubs, hosts multiple students activities throughout each semester, and provides on campus-campus residence and dining options. For other institutional supports, NIACC provides access to academic advisors, wellness professionals through the wellness hub, a food pantry, career advising and other academic supports. NIACC residential students reside in the Campus View Housing Complex, an apartment-style housing center on the north side of campus. Dining and food service are provided by the Campus Dining Center, as well as the Food Court which is located in the Activity Center.

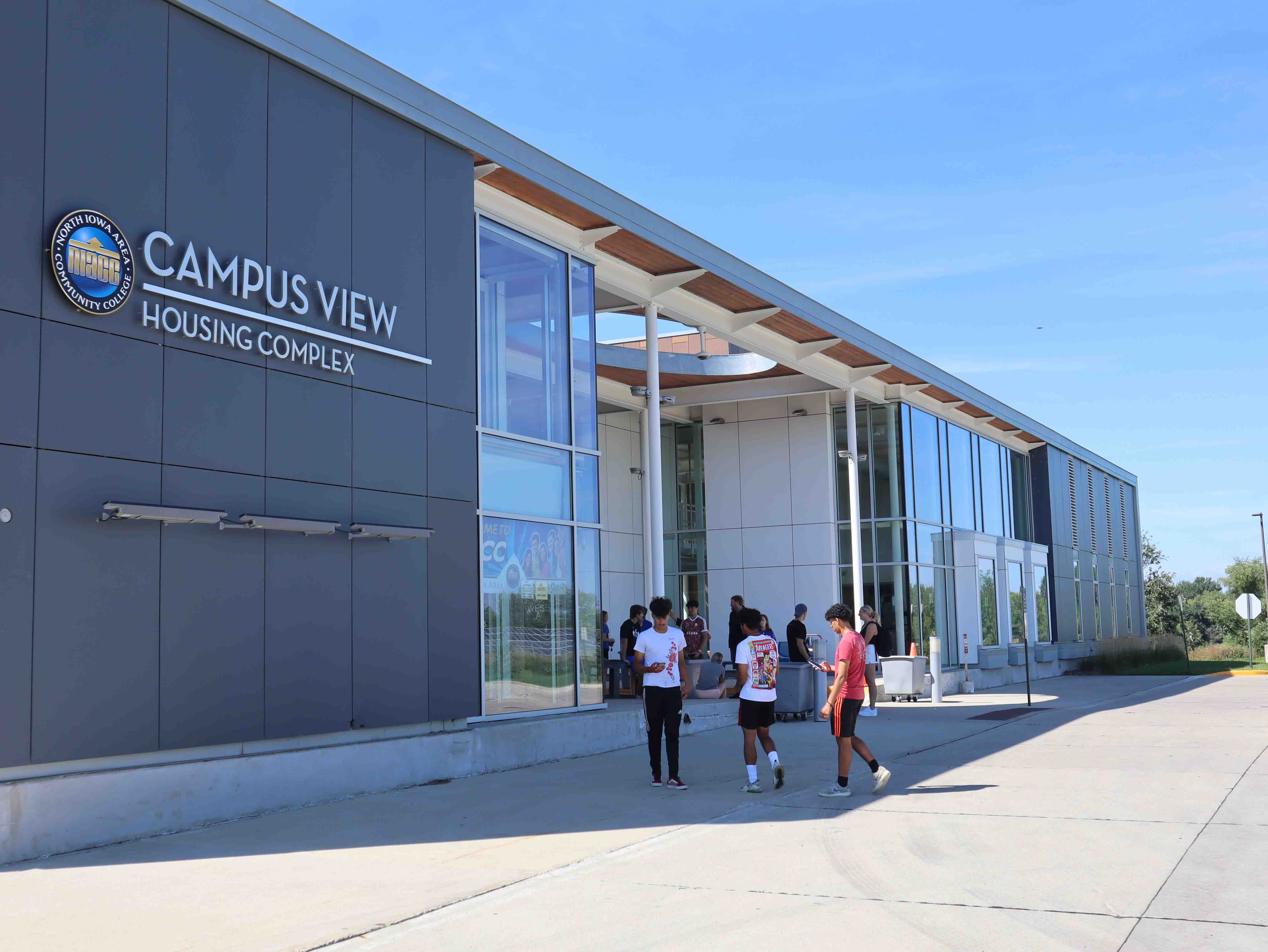
Campus View Student Housing Complex

=== Library ===
The NIACC library is open to all college students and the general public. Through the Iowa Open Access program, anyone with a library card through a participating library and access and check-out NIACC Library academic materials. The Library is located at the center of campus within the Beem Center, which is named for former NIACC dean Clifford Beam.

=== Performing arts ===
The North Iowa Area Auditorium is located at NIACC. The auditorium, situated at NIACC, is the largest theater in North-Central Iowa. It was inaugurated in 1978, with the presence of Mason City native, and Grammy winning musical composer Meredith Willson. The annual NIACC Performing Arts and Leadership Series is hosted in the auditorium. The concourse of the auditorim is host to the NIACC Gallery, an art gallery that is host to artworks created by NIACC students, as well regional and national artists.

For instrumental music the community college sponsors a Concert Band, and a Jazz Band. For vocal music, the college has a non-auditioned Concert Choir, and the NIACC Singers, an auditioned ensemble group.

== Athletics ==
North Iowa Area Community College's athletic teams are nicknamed the Trojans. NIACC is a member of the National Junior College Athletic Association and the Iowa Community College Athletic Conference.

=== Sports teams ===
- Baseball (men's)
- Basketball (men's and women's)
  - NJCCA Division II Men's Basketball National Champions: 1995.
- Cross Country (men's and women's)
  - NJCCA Division II Men's Cross Country National Champions: 2020.
- eSports
- Golf (men's and women's)
- Soccer (men's and women's)
- Softball (women's)
- Track & Field (men's and women's)
- Volleyball (women's)
- Wrestling (men's and women's)
  - NJCCA Men's Wrestling National Champions: 1973.

== Notable alumni ==
- Bryce Ball, professional baseball player
- William Bernau, politician
- William Dotzler, politician
- Aden Durde, professional football player
- Dennis Eckhoff, former college football player
- Robbie Glendinning, professional baseball player
- Shawn Harper, professional football player
- Chuck Harris professional football player
- Rita Hart, politician
- MarTay Jenkins, professional football player
- James Johnson, politician
- Ben McCollum, college basketball coach
- Jerry Montgomery, former defensive coordinator
- Theodore P. Savas, attorney, publisher, and entrepreneur
- Linda Upmeyer, politician
- Boy van Vliet, professional basketball player
- Esther J. Walls, international advocate for literacy
- Brandon Williamson, professional baseball player
- Marshal Yanda, professional football player

== Notable staff ==
- Dan Fitzgerald, former assistant baseball coach
- Chris Prothro, former assistant baseball coach
- Scott Strohmeier, former football head coach
