= Mississippi Gulf Coast Community College =

Public college in Perkinston, Mississippi, US

Coordinates: 30.78137°N 89.14204°W

- Type: Public community college
- Academic affiliations: Space-grant
- President: Mary S. Graham
- Location: Perkinston, Mississippi, United States
- Colors: Blue & Gold
- Mascot: Bulldogs
- Website: MGCCC.edu

Mississippi Gulf Coast Community College (MGCCC) is a public community college with its main campus in Perkinston, Mississippi. It was founded as Harrison County Agricultural High School in 1912 and serves George, Harrison, Jackson, and Stone counties.

== History ==
MGCCC began as the Harrison County Agricultural High School on September 17, 1911. Four years later, north Harrison County became Stone County, and both counties continued to support the school. On September 14, 1925, with the support of Jackson County, Harrison-Stone-Jackson Agricultural High School and Junior College began offering its first year of Junior College work. George County then added its support in 1942, and the institution took the name of Perkinston Junior College.

In 1962, the Mississippi Gulf Coast Junior College District was formed, and three years later, Mississippi Gulf Coast Junior College added the Jefferson Davis and Jackson County campuses. Between 1965 and 1985, 4 new centers were opened. The college name was changed to Mississippi Gulf Coast Community College on October 1, 1987. In 1996, the Community Campus, a campus without walls, was added as a fourth campus.

In 2006, President George W. Bush became the first sitting President to speak at a community college graduation, when he spoke at Mississippi Gulf Coast Community College.

In June 2018, the Bryant Center School of Nursing & Simulation Lab opened in the Tradition Community, Harrison County.

On July 22, 2020, the Board of Trustees for MGCCC voted to change the name of the Jefferson Davis Campus to the Harrison County Campus, as people in Mississippi and in the U.S. called for the removal of symbols and names that honor the Confederate States of America.

== Campus ==
MGCCC has three campuses and seven centers:

- The main campus in Perkinston;
- The Jackson County Campus in Gautier;
- The Harrison County Campus in Gulfport;
- The George County Center in Lucedale;
- The West Harrison County Center in Long Beach;
- The Advanced Manufacturing & Technology Center in Gulfport;
- The Keesler Center at Keesler Air Force Base in Biloxi;
- The Naval Construction Battalion Center in Gulfport;
- The Bryant Center at Tradition in Harrison County; and
- The Haley Reeves Barbour Maritime Training Academy in Pascagoula.

The Jackson County Campus in Gautier is located near the former Singing River Mall site. The mall closed as an enclosed shopping mall in 2013 as its remaining interior tenants vacated ahead of redevelopment. Demolition of the mall began in February 2014 as part of the site's redevelopment.

MGCCC also offers a Community Campus that provides workforce education programs, onsite and online, to south Mississippi residents and employers.

== Athletics ==
The college's athletic teams are known as the Bulldogs. They compete in the Mississippi Association of Community & Junior Colleges in football, basketball, baseball, soccer, softball, golf and tennis. The 1971, 1984, and 2019 Mississippi Gulf Coast Bulldogs football teams won the national junior college football championships. The 2007 team was co-national champion. The 1948 football team also shared the Williamson Football Rating Bureau national championship with Compton Junior College. The men's golf team won the NJCAA Division II Men's Golf Championship in 2018 and Colin Troxler won an individual national championship in 2017. The women's basketball team won the Association for Intercollegiate Athletics for Women Junior College national championship in 1973.

== Notable alumni ==
Name	Class year	Notability	Reference(s)
Boyce Holleman	1940s	Attorney, politician, and actor	
Fred Haise	1952	American engineer, NASA astronaut, Apollo 13 lunar mission	
Jamie Henderson	1997–1998	American football cornerback	
Tom Johnson	2003–2004	American football defensive tackle	
Dantrell Savage	2005	American football running back	
Brittney Reese	2006	American long jumper/Olympian	
Terrence Cody	2007	American football nose tackle	
Eltoro Freeman	2008	American football linebacker	
Demond Washington	2008	American football defensive back	
Vick Ballard	2008–2009	American football running back	
Drew Granier	2009	Professional baseball player	
John Jenkins	2009	American football nose tackle	
Chris White (linebacker)	2009	American football middle linebacker	
Don Jones	2010	American football defensive back	
Alonzo Lawrence	2012	American football defensive back	
Tramain Jacobs	2010	American football defensive back	

== Gallery ==
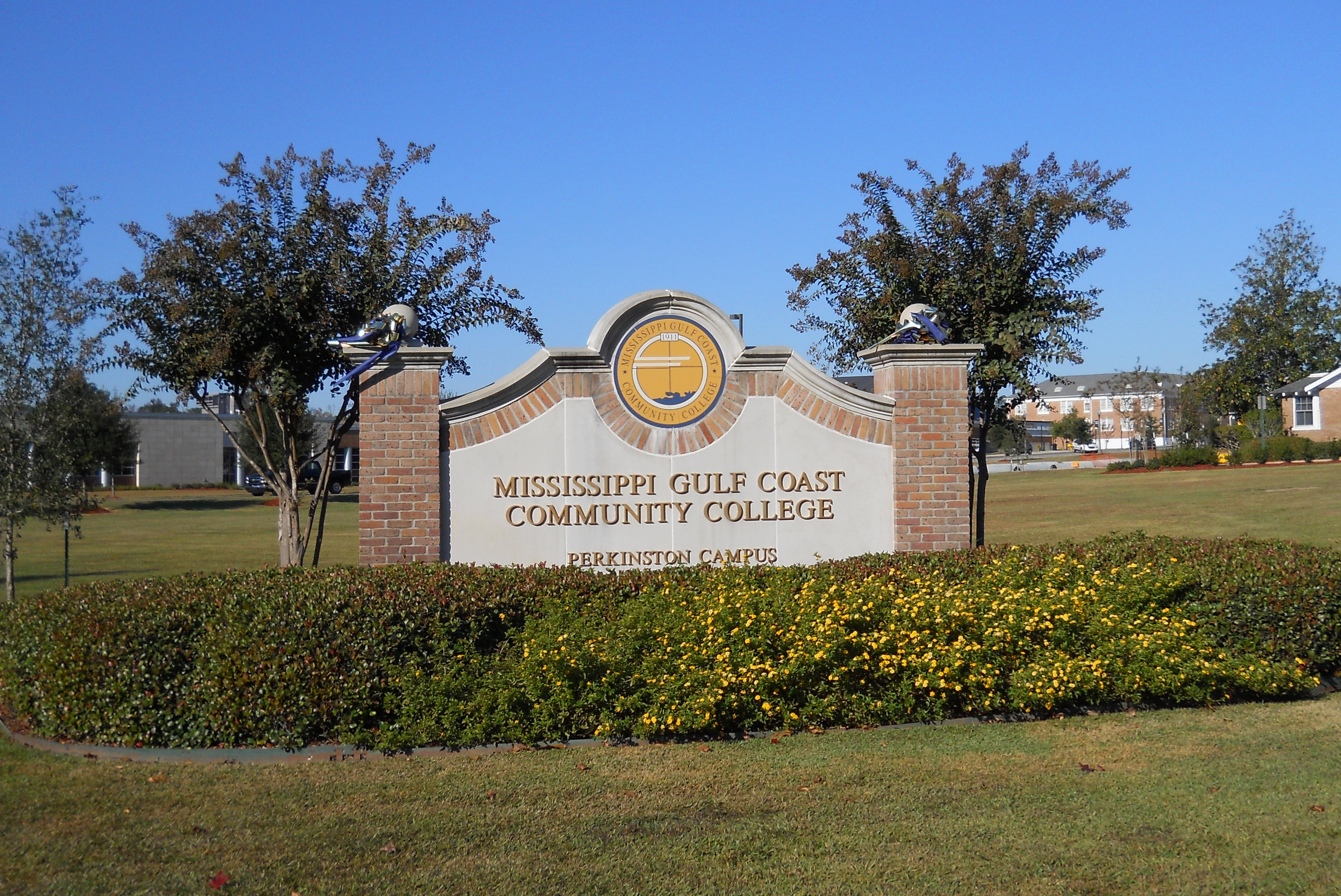
Perkinston Campus sign

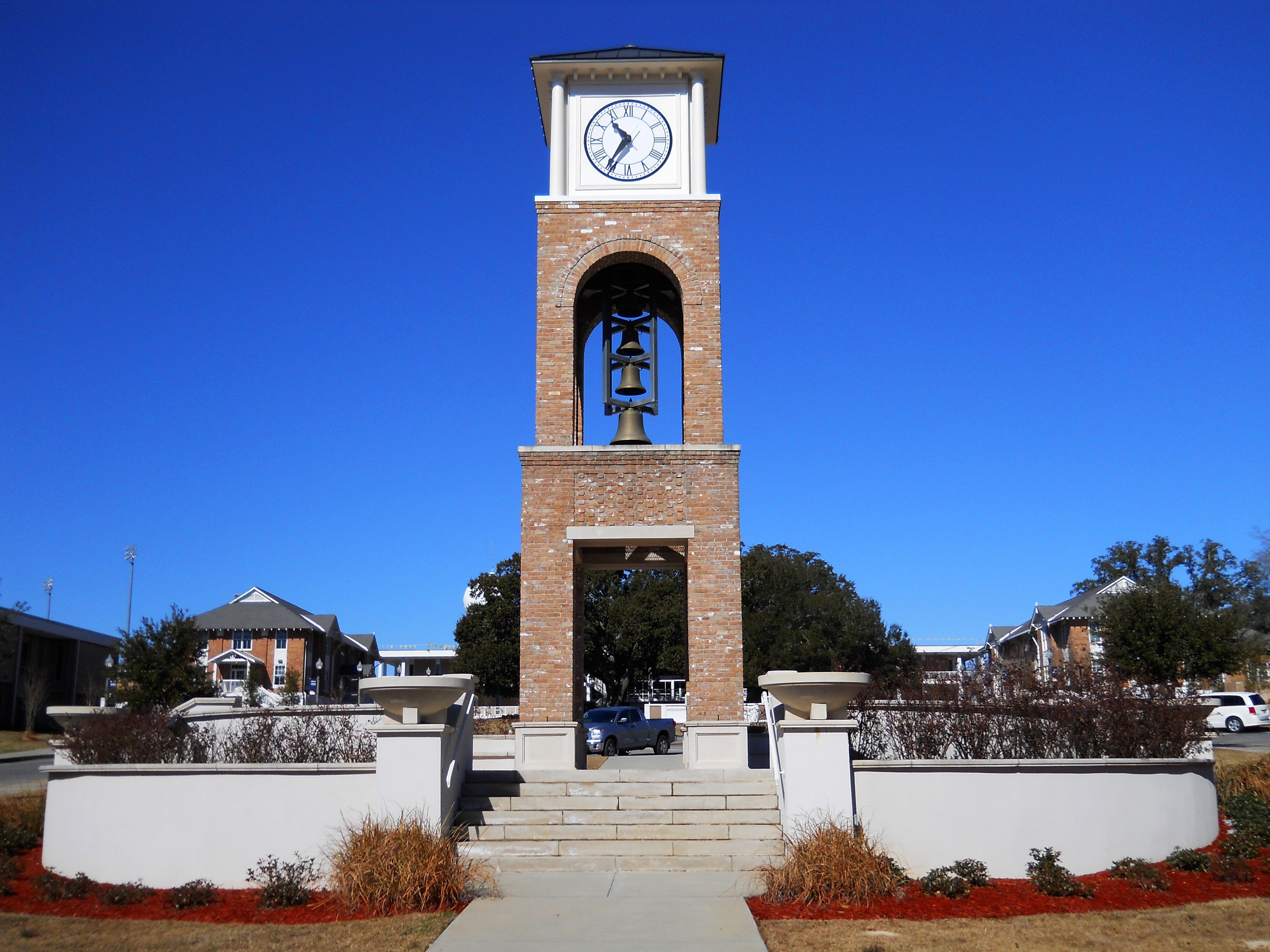
Clock tower on Perkinston Campus

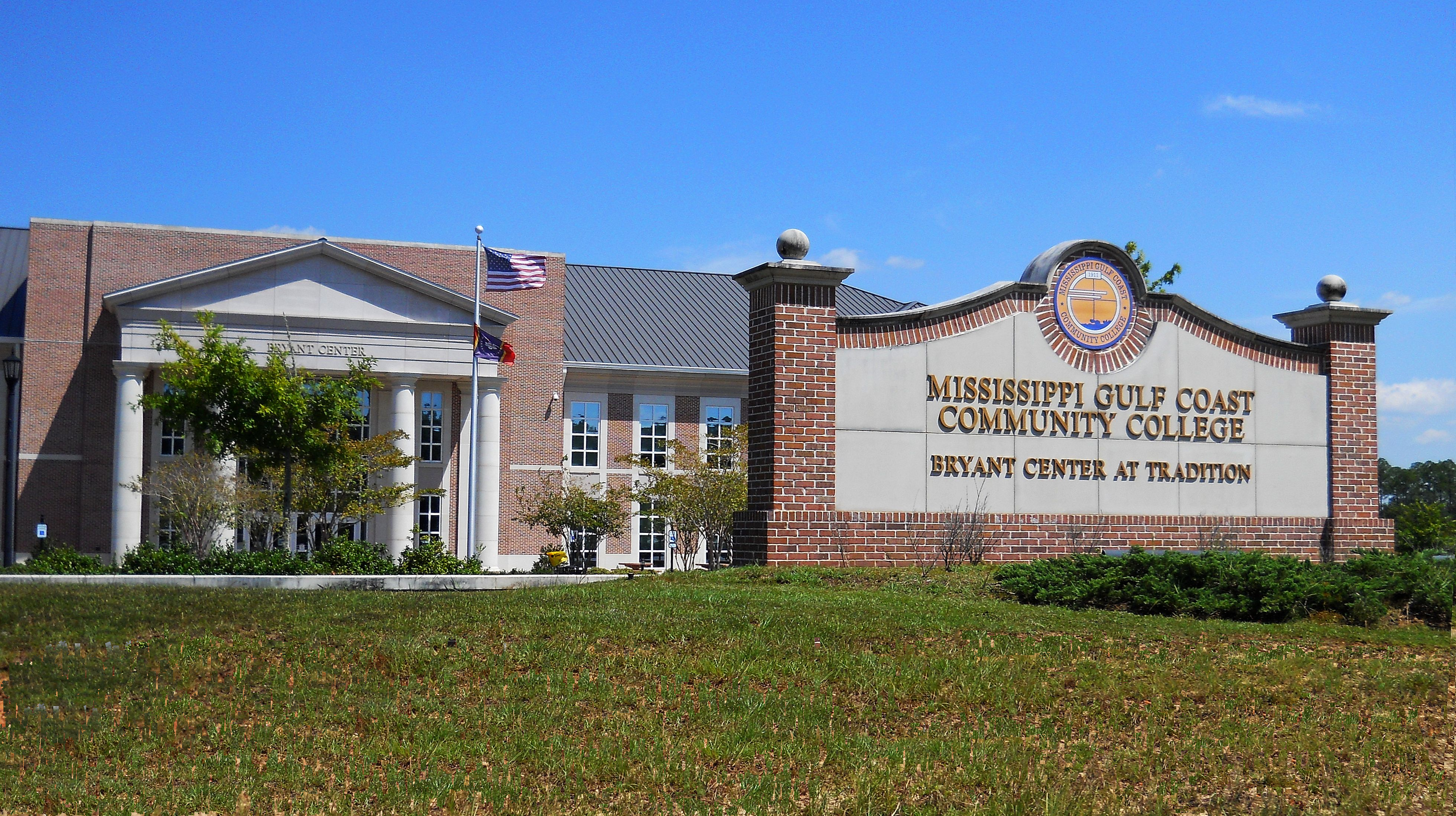
Bryant Center School of Nursing

== See also ==
- Harrison Hall (Mississippi Gulf Coast Community College)
