= Iowa Lakes Community College =

Public college in Estherville, Iowa, US

Coordinates: 43.3970°N 94.8177°W

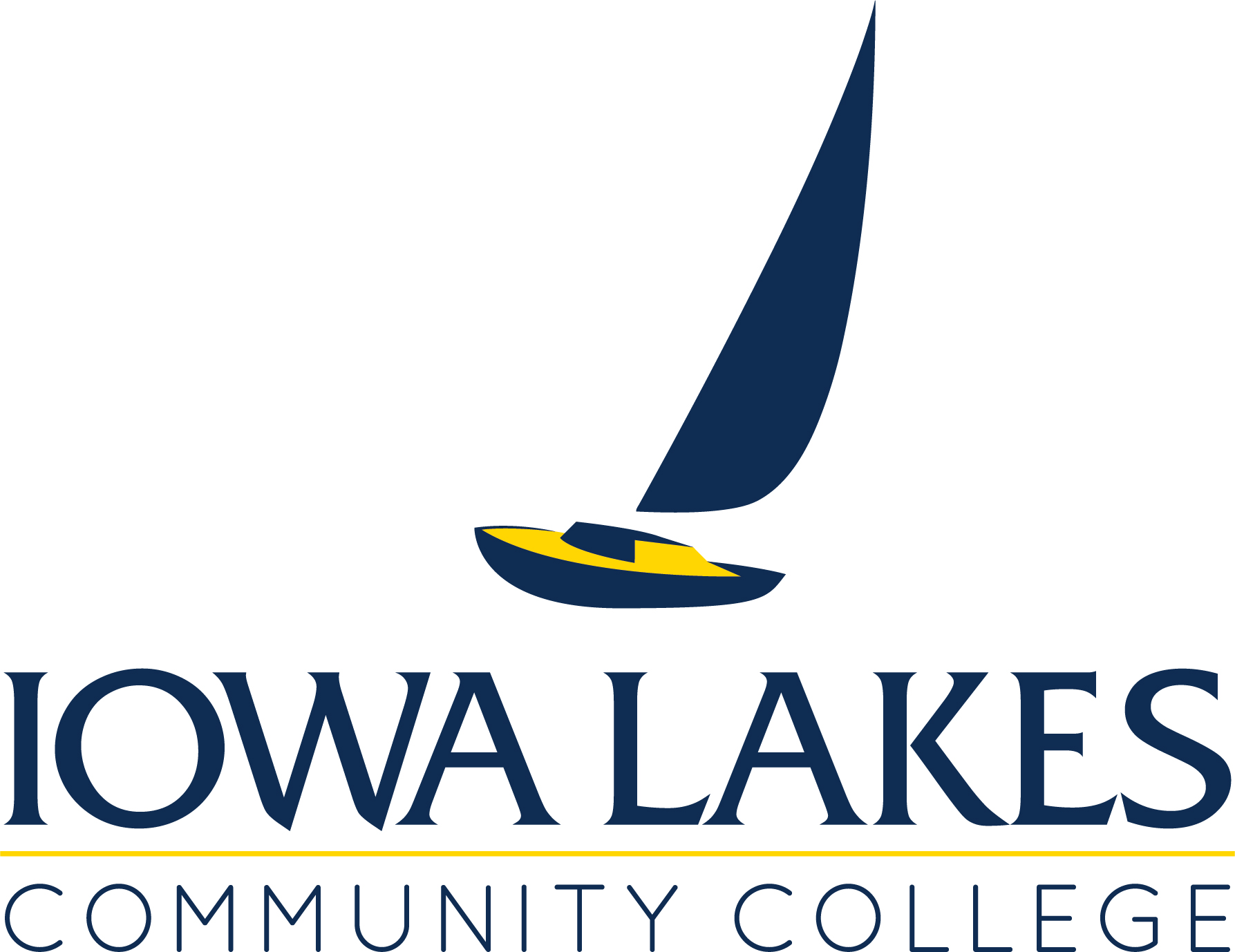
- Type: Public community college
- Established: 1967
- President: Scott Stokes
- Faculty: 165 (87 full-time, 78 part-time)
- Students: 2,315
- Location: Estherville, Iowa, United States
- Campus: Rural
- Colors: Laker Blue and Laker Gold
- Nickname: Lakers
- Sporting affiliations: National Junior College Athletic Association, Iowa Community College Athletic Conference
- Mascot: Captain Jack
- Website: www.iowalakes.edu

Iowa Lakes Community College is a public community college based in Estherville, Iowa, United States, with campuses also located in Algona, Emmetsburg, Spencer and Spirit Lake. It serves Iowa Community College District III, which encompasses an area roughly contiguous with Clay, Dickinson, Emmet, Kossuth and Palo Alto counties. The predominantly rural district encompasses and area of approximately 2,900 square miles (7,500 square kilometers) and a population of just over 73,000.

== Athletics ==
Iowa Lakes Community College's athletic teams are nicknamed the Lakers. Iowa Lakes is a member of the National Junior College Athletic Association and the Iowa Community College Athletic Conference. There are men's teams in baseball, basketball, golf, soccer, sports shooting, swimming and diving, and wrestling, and women's teams in basketball, competitive dance, golf, soccer, softball, sports shooting, swimming and diving, volleyball, and wrestling. All Laker athletic teams are based out of the Estherville campus except for men's and women's soccer, which is based out of the Spencer campus and men's and women's sports shooting and swimming and diving, which are located on the Emmetsburg Campus.

== History ==
Iowa Lakes Community College was officially established on October 28, 1966 by the Iowa Department of Education under provision of Chapters 260C and 260D, Code of Iowa. In 1968 Iowa Lakes merged with Estherville Junior College, which was founded in 1924 and operated by Estherville Public Schools. In 1970 Iowa Lakes became a multi-campus institution when it merged with Emmetsburg Junior College which was founded in 1930 and operated by Emmetsburg Public Schools. Additional campus were opened in Spencer in the mid 1970s, in Spirit Lake in 1984, and in Algona in 1986.
