= Iowa Community College Athletic Conference =

Junior college athletic conference

- Association: NJCAA
- Commissioner: Thom McDonald
- Sports fielded: 25 (13 men's, 12 women's)
- Division: Region 11
- No. of teams: 18
- Headquarters: Ames, Iowa
- Region: Midwest (Iowa and northeast Nebraska)
- Website: www.iccac.org

The Iowa Community College Athletic Conference (ICCAC) is the Region 11 of the National Junior College Athletic Association (NJCAA). The Commissioner's Office, headquartered in Ames, Iowa oversees 25 sports. Conference championships are held in most sports and individuals can be named to All-Conference and All-Academic teams.

== Member schools ==
=== Current members ===
The ICCAC currently has 18 full members, all are public schools:

Institution	Location	Founded	Affiliation	Enrollment	Nickname	Joined	Colors
Central Community College at Columbus	Columbus, Nebraska	1969	Public	?	Raiders	2025	
Des Moines Area Community College	Boone, Iowa	1966	Public	25,425	Bears	?	
Ellsworth Community College	Iowa Falls, Iowa	1890	Public	1,100	Panthers	?	
Hawkeye Community College	Waterloo, Iowa	1966	Public	5,042	RedTails	2015	
Indian Hills Community College	Ottumwa, Iowa	1966	Public	5,520	Warriors & Falcons	?	
Iowa Central Community College	Fort Dodge, Iowa	1966	Public	5,697	Tritons	?	
Iowa Lakes Community College	Estherville, Iowa	1924	Public	2,349	Lakers	?	
Iowa Western Community College	Council Bluffs, Iowa	1967	Public	5,500	Reivers	?	
Kirkwood Community College	Cedar Rapids, Iowa	1966	Public	17,625	Eagles	?	
Marshalltown Community College	Marshalltown, Iowa	1927	Public	2,971	Tigers	?	
Northeast Community College	Norfolk, Nebraska	1928	Public	2,343	Hawks	2013	
Northeast Iowa Community College	Calmar, Iowa	1966	Public	4,786	Cougars	2025	
North Iowa Area Community College	Mason City, Iowa	1918	Public	2,353	Trojans	?	
Northwest Iowa Community College	Sheldon, Iowa	1966	Public	2,036	Thunder	2024	
Scott Community College	Bettendorf, Iowa	1966	Public (Note: Part of the Eastern Iowa Community Colleges System.)	5,026	Eagles	?	
Southeastern Community College	Burlington, Iowa	1920	Public	3,601	Blackhawks	?	
Southwestern Community College	Creston, Iowa	1926	Public	1,785	Spartans	?	
Western Iowa Tech Community College	Sioux City, Iowa	1966	Public	6,787	Comets	2023	

=== Partial members ===
The ICCAC has one partial member, which is also a public school:

Institution	Location (Note: All locations are within the State of Iowa.)	Founded	Affiliation	Enrollment	Nickname	Joined	Colors	ICCAC sport(s)	Current conference
Dakota County Technical College	Rosemount, Minnesota	1970	Public (Note: Part of the Minnesota State Colleges and Universities System.)	3,000	Blue Knights	?		men's soccer women's soccer	Independent (NJCAA Region XIII)

=== Former members ===
The ICCAC had five former full members, three were public schools:

Institution	Location	Founded	Affiliation	Enrollment	Nickname	Joined	Left	Current conference
AIB College of Business	Des Moines, Iowa	1921	Non-profit	1,014	Eagles	?	2010	Closed in 2016
Clinton Community College	Clinton, Iowa	1946	Public (Note: Part of the Eastern Iowa Community Colleges System.)	1,500	Cougars	?	2015	N/A (Note: Discontinued its athletics program.)
Little Priest Tribal College	Winnebago, Nebraska	1996	Public (Note: Part of the Nebraska Community College Association.)	?	Warriors	2018	2020	N/A (Note: Athletics program ended due to COVID-19 pandemic.)
Muscatine Community College	Muscatine, Iowa	1929	Public	1,850	Cardinals	?	?	N/A
Waldorf College (Note: Currently known as Waldorf University since 2016.)	Forest City, Iowa	1903	For-profit	580	Warriors	?	?	Great Plains (GPAC) (Note: Currently an NAIA athletic conference.)

== Sports sponsored ==
The ICCAC member teams compete in:

- Baseball (men's)
- Basketball (men's & women's)
- Bowling (men's & women's)
- Cross country (men's & women's)
- Football (men's)
- Golf (men's & women's)
- Indoor track & field (men's & women's)
- Outdoor track & field (men's & women's)
- Rodeo (men's & women's)
- Soccer (men's & women's)
- Softball (women's)
- Sports shooting (men's & women's)
- Swimming & diving (men's & women's)
- Volleyball (women's)
- Wrestling (men's)

== National championships ==
=== Football ===
- 1976 Ellsworth (9-0)
- 1978 Iowa Central (9-1)
- 1987 Ellsworth (10-0)
- 2012 Iowa Western (12-0)
- 2022 Iowa Western (10-2)
- 2023 Iowa Western (12-1)
- 2025 Iowa Western (12-1)

=== Men's basketball ===
- 1971 Ellsworth
- 1995 NIACC (DII)
- 1997 Indian Hills
- 1998 Indian Hills
- 1998 Kirkwood (DII)
- 1999 Indian Hills
- 2000 Southeastern
- 2003 Southeastern
- 2004 Southeastern
- 2016 Kirkwood (DII)
- 2017 Southwestern (DII)
- 2021 Des Moines Area (DII)
- 2025 Kirkwood (DII)

=== Women's basketball ===
- 1997 Kirkwood (DII)
- 2002 Kirkwood (DII)
- 2007 Kirkwood (DII)
- 2008 Kirkwood (DII)
- 2009 Kirkwood (DII)
- 2010 Kirkwood (DII)
- 2017 Kirkwood (DII)
- 2022 Kirkwood (DII)
- 2024 Kirkwood (DII)

=== Baseball ===
- 2010 Iowa Western
- 2012 Iowa Western
- 2014 Iowa Western

=== Men's bowling ===
- 2017 Iowa Central
- 2019 Iowa Central
- 2021 Hawkeye
- 2025 Iowa Central

=== Women's Bowling ===
- 2020 Iowa Central
- 2021 Iowa Central

=== Men's cross country ===
- 2014 Iowa Central
- 2015 Iowa Central
- 2017 Iowa Central
- 2020 Iowa Central
- 2020 North Iowa Area (DII)
- 2021 Iowa Central
- 2025 Iowa Central

=== Women's cross country ===
- 2007 Iowa Central
- 2008 Iowa Central
- 2011 Iowa Central
- 2012 Iowa Central
- 2013 Iowa Central
- 2017 Iowa Central
- 2018 Iowa Central
- 2019 Iowa Central

=== Men's half marathon ===
- 2007 Iowa Central
- 2011 Iowa Central
- 2012 Iowa Central
- 2013 Iowa Central
- 2016 Iowa Central
- 2017 Iowa Central
- 2020 Iowa Central
- 2021 Iowa Central
- 2024 Iowa Western
- 2025 Iowa Western

=== Women's half marathon ===
- 2011 Iowa Central
- 2012 Iowa Central
- 2016 Iowa Central
- 2017 Iowa Central
- 2019 Iowa Central
- 2022 Iowa Central

=== Men's golf ===
- 2000 Indian Hills (DII)
- 2011 Indian Hills
- 2012 Indian Hills
- 2014 Indian Hills
- 2015 Indian Hills
- 2018 Indian Hills
- 2023 Indian Hills
- 2023 Kirkwood (DII)

=== Men's soccer ===
- 2013 Iowa Western
- 2020–21 Southeastern (DII)
- 2021 Iowa Western
- 2023 Iowa Lakes (DII)
- 2024 Northeast Nebraska (DII)
- 2024 Iowa Western
- 2025 Indian Hills

=== Women's soccer ===
- 2013 Iowa Western
- 2015 Iowa Central
- 2022 Iowa Western
- 2023 Iowa Western

=== Softball ===
- 1977 Ellsworth
- 2003 Southeastern

=== Men's track and field ===
- 2011 Iowa Central (Indoor)
- 2012 Iowa Central (Indoor)
- 2014 Iowa Central (Indoor)
- 2016 Iowa Central (Indoor)
- 2017 Iowa Central (Indoor)
- 2019 Iowa Central (Indoor)
- 2020 Iowa Central (Indoor)
- 2024 Indian Hills (Indoor)

=== Women's track and field ===
- 2010 Iowa Central (Indoor)
- 2012 Iowa Central (Indoor)
- 2013 Iowa Central (Outdoor)
- 2014 Iowa Central (Indoor)
- 2016 Iowa Central (Indoor)
- 2016 Iowa Central (Outdoor)
- 2021 Iowa Western (Indoor)
- 2022 Iowa Western (Indoor)
- 2022 Iowa Western (Outdoor)
- 2024 Iowa Western (Indoor)
- 2025 Iowa Western (Indoor)
- 2025 Iowa Western (Outdoor)
- 2026 Iowa Western (Indoor)

=== Volleyball ===
- 2003 Kirkwood (DII)
- 2006 Iowa Western
- 2020–21 Iowa Western
- 2021 Iowa Western

=== Men's Wrestling ===
- 1973 NIACC
- 1981 Iowa Central
- 2002 Iowa Central
- 2006 Iowa Central
- 2007 Iowa Central
- 2008 Iowa Central
- 2009 Iowa Central
- 2015 Iowa Central
- 2017 Iowa Central
- 2025 Indian Hills
- 2026 Indian Hills

=== Women's Wrestling ===
- 2023 Indian Hills
- 2024 Indian Hills
- 2025 Indian Hills
- 2026 Indian Hills

== The Graphic Edge Bowl ==
The ICCAC, along with primary sponsor The Graphic Edge, puts on two annual bowl games the first Sunday of December at the UNI-Dome in Cedar Falls. The two games feature the top two teams from the ICCAC versus at-large qualifiers. If one of the Iowa teams has qualified for the NJCAA national championship game, the "feature" game becomes the national championship game if the best Iowa team is ranked No. 1. If the best Iowa team is ranked No. 2, the third-best Iowa team takes its place in the Graphic Edge Bowl. It's possible for both Iowa teams to have losing records in this case as the NJCAA does not require a team to have a winning record to qualify for a bowl game.

The now-defunct Midwest Football Conference, which featured as many as 10 teams from Iowa, Illinois, Michigan and North Dakota sent the champions of each of its divisions unless one of them qualified for the national championship game as the No. 2-ranked team, in which case another Midwest Football Conference team qualified for the bowl in its place.

The second-best Iowa team plays one of the at-large teams in the first game, which kicks off at 11 a.m. The best Iowa team plays another at-large team in the 2:30 p.m. "Feature" game, which can be for the NJCAA title if the Iowa team is ranked No. 1 and the No. 2 team is able to accept a bid to the game.

The two at-large bids vary from year-to-year, but recent tendency is that the 11 a.m. game features one of the better teams from the MCAC (Minnesota College Athletic Conference) and that the later game features a highly-ranked opponent.

== Yearly football standings ==
1969 Iowa Junior College Conference football standings
	Conf.					Overall
Team	W		L		T	W		L		T
Iowa Central $	4	–	0	–	1	8	–	1	–	1
Centerville	4	–	1	–	0	7	–	3	–	0
Ellsworth	3	–	1	–	1	6	–	2	–	1
North Iowa Area	2	–	3	–	0	2	–	6	–	0
Marshalltown	1	–	4	–	0	1	–	7	–	0
Iowa Lakes	0	–	5	–	0	0	–	8	–	0
$ – Conference champion

1970 Iowa Junior College Conference football standings
	Conf.					Overall
Team	W		L		T	W		L		T
Ellsworth $	4	–	1	–	0	6	–	3	–	0
Centerville	3	–	1	–	1	5	–	3	–	1
Iowa Central	3	–	1	–	1	5	–	3	–	1
Marshalltown	2	–	3	–	0	5	–	3	–	0
North Iowa Area	1	–	4	–	0	2	–	5	–	0
Iowa Lakes	1	–	4	–	0	1	–	6	–	1
Waldorf	0	–	0	–	0	4	–	3	–	0
$ – Conference champion

1971 Iowa Junior College Conference football standings
	Conf.					Overall
Team	W		L		T	W		L		T
Indian Hills $	5	–	0	–	1	6	–	2	–	1
Ellsworth	5	–	1	–	0	7	–	2	–	1
Waldorf	3	–	2	–	1	4	–	4	–	1
Iowa Central	3	–	3	–	0	4	–	5	–	0
Marshalltown	2	–	4	–	0	5	–	4	–	0
Iowa Lakes	1	–	5	–	0	4	–	5	–	0
North Iowa Area	1	–	5	–	0	2	–	7	–	0
$ – Conference champion

1972 Iowa Junior College Conference football standings
	Conf.					Overall
Team	W		L		T	W		L		T
Iowa Central $	6	–	0	–	0	8	–	0	–	2
Ellsworth	5	–	1	–	0	6	–	3	–	0
Indian Hills	4	–	2	–	0	5	–	4	–	0
Waldorf	3	–	3	–	0	5	–	5	–	0
North Iowa Area	2	–	4	–	0	4	–	5	–	0
Marshalltown	1	–	5	–	0	1	–	8	–	0
Iowa Lakes	0	–	6	–	0	0	–	9	–	0
$ – Conference champion

1973 Iowa Junior College Conference football standings
	Conf.					Overall
Team	W		L		T	W		L		T
Iowa Central $	5	–	0	–	0	9	–	1	–	0
Indian Hills	4	–	1	–	0	7	–	2	–	0
Ellsworth	3	–	2	–	0	6	–	3	–	0
North Iowa Area	2	–	3	–	0	4	–	4	–	0
Waldorf	1	–	4	–	0	5	–	4	–	0
Marshalltown	0	–	5	–	0	2	–	7	–	0
$ – Conference champion

1974 Iowa Junior College Conference football standings
	Conf.					Overall
Team	W		L		T	W		L		T
Indian Hills $	5	–	0	–	0	10	–	1	–	0
Waldorf	4	–	2	–	0	7	–	2	–	0
North Iowa Area	3	–	3	–	0	5	–	4	–	0
Ellsworth	2	–	3	–	0	4	–	5	–	0
Marshalltown	0	–	6	–	0	0	–	9	–	0
$ – Conference champion

1975 Iowa Junior College Conference football standings
	Conf.					Overall
Team	W		L		T	W		L		T
Waldorf $	7	–	0	–	0	9	–	0	–	0
Ellsworth	4	–	2	–	0	6	–	3	–	0
Iowa Central	4	–	3	–	0	4	–	5	–	0
Iowa Lakes	2	–	3	–	0	5	–	4	–	0
North Iowa Area	2	–	5	–	0	4	–	5	–	0
Marshalltown	0	–	6	–	0	1	–	8	–	0
$ – Conference champion

1976 Iowa Junior College Conference football standings
	Conf.					Overall
Team	W		L		T	W		L		T
Ellsworth $	7	–	0	–	0	9	–	1	–	0
Iowa Central	5	–	3	–	0	6	–	3	–	0
Waldorf	3	–	3	–	0	5	–	4	–	0
North Iowa Area	4	–	5	–	0	4	–	5	–	0
Iowa Lakes	2	–	4	–	0	4	–	6	–	0
Marshalltown	0	–	6	–	0	1	–	8	–	0
$ – Conference champion

1977 Iowa Junior College Conference football standings
	Conf.					Overall
Team	W		L		T	W		L		T
Ellsworth $	8	–	1	–	0	9	–	1	–	0
North Iowa Area	7	–	3	–	0	7	–	3	–	0
Waldorf	5	–	4	–	0	5	–	5	–	0
Iowa Central	4	–	5	–	0	4	–	6	–	0
Iowa Lakes	2	–	7	–	0	3	–	7	–	0
Marshalltown	0	–	6	–	0	2	–	7	–	0
$ – Conference champion

1978 Iowa Junior College Conference football standings
	Conf.					Overall
Team	W		L		T	W		L		T
Iowa Central $	8	–	0	–	0	10	–	1	–	0
Ellsworth	5	–	3	–	0	6	–	3	–	0
Waldorf	4	–	4	–	0	5	–	4	–	0
North Iowa Area	2	–	6	–	0	3	–	7	–	0
Iowa Lakes	1	–	7	–	0	1	–	8	–	0
$ – Conference champion

1980 Iowa Junior College Conference football standings
	Conf.					Overall
Team	W		L		T	W		L		T
Iowa Central $	7	–	1	–	0	9	–	1	–	0
Ellsworth	6	–	2	–	0	9	–	2	–	0
North Iowa Area	4	–	4	–	0	5	–	5	–	0
Waldorf	3	–	5	–	0	3	–	6	–	1
Iowa Lakes	0	–	8	–	0	2	–	8	–	0
$ – Conference champion

1981 Iowa Junior College Conference football standings
	Conf.					Overall
Team	W		L		T	W		L		T
Ellsworth $	5	–	1	–	0	8	–	2	–	0
Waldorf	4	–	2	–	0	6	–	3	–	0
Iowa Central	3	–	3	–	0	4	–	5	–	0
North Iowa Area	1	–	5	–	0	3	–	6	–	0
Iowa Lakes *	0	–	0	–	0	2	–	7	–	0
$ – Conference champion; * – Did not compete for conference championship

1982 Iowa Junior College Conference football standings
	Conf.					Overall
Team	W		L		T	W		L		T
Iowa Central $	5	–	1	–	0	7	–	3	–	0
Ellsworth	4	–	2	–	0	6	–	3	–	1
North Iowa Area	2	–	4	–	0	4	–	5	–	0
Waldorf	1	–	5	–	0	2	–	7	–	0
Iowa Lakes *	0	–	0	–	0	2	–	8	–	0
$ – Conference champion; * – Did not compete for conference championship

1983 Iowa Junior College Conference football standings
	Conf.					Overall
Team	W		L		T	W		L		T
Ellsworth $	6	–	0	–	0	10	–	1	–	0
Iowa Central	4	–	2	–	0	7	–	2	–	0
Waldorf	2	–	4	–	0	4	–	5	–	0
North Iowa Area	0	–	6	–	0	2	–	8	–	0
Iowa Lakes *	0	–	0	–	0	3	–	7	–	0
$ – Conference champion; * – Did not compete for conference championship

1984 Iowa Junior College Conference football standings
	Conf.					Overall
Team	W		L		T	W		L		T
Ellsworth $	4	–	0	–	0	9	–	2	–	0
Iowa Central	3	–	1	–	0	8	–	2	–	0
Waldorf	2	–	2	–	0	7	–	3	–	0
Iowa Lakes	1	–	3	–	0	6	–	3	–	0
North Iowa Area	0	–	4	–	0	1	–	9	–	0
$ – Conference champion

1985 Iowa Junior College Conference football standings
	Conf.					Overall
Team	W		L		T	W		L		T
Iowa Central $	5	–	1	–	0	9	–	1	–	0
Ellsworth	4	–	2	–	0	7	–	4	–	0
Waldorf	2	–	4	–	0	4	–	5	–	0
North Iowa Area	1	–	5	–	0	3	–	7	–	0
Iowa Lakes *	0	–	0	–	0	6	–	4	–	0
$ – Conference champion; * – Did not compete for conference championship

1986 Iowa Junior College Conference football standings
	Conf.					Overall
Team	W		L		T	W		L		T
Iowa Central $	4	–	0	–	0	9	–	2	–	0
Ellsworth	3	–	1	–	0	6	–	4	–	0
Waldorf	2	–	2	–	0	7	–	2	–	0
Iowa Lakes	1	–	3	–	0	7	–	3	–	0
North Iowa Area	0	–	4	–	0	0	–	8	–	1
$ – Conference champion

1987 Iowa Junior College Conference football standings
	Conf.					Overall
Team	W		L		T	W		L		T
Ellsworth $	4	–	0	–	0	10	–	0	–	0
Waldorf	2	–	2	–	0	7	–	3	–	0
Iowa Lakes	2	–	2	–	0	6	–	4	–	0
North Iowa Area	1	–	3	–	0	5	–	4	–	0
Iowa Central	1	–	3	–	0	3	–	4	–	0
$ – Conference champion

1988 Iowa Junior College Conference football standings
	Conf.					Overall
Team	W		L		T	W		L		T
Ellsworth $	4	–	0	–	0	10	–	1	–	0
Iowa Central	3	–	1	–	0	5	–	4	–	0
North Iowa Area	2	–	2	–	0	7	–	3	–	0
Waldorf	1	–	3	–	0	5	–	4	–	0
Iowa Lakes	0	–	4	–	0	2	–	7	–	0
$ – Conference champion

1989 Iowa Junior College Conference football standings
	Conf.					Overall
Team	W		L		T	W		L		T
Ellsworth $	5	–	0	–	0	9	–	1	–	0
Iowa Central	3	–	2	–	0	6	–	5	–	0
Waldorf	3	–	2	–	0	5	–	5	–	0
North Iowa Area	2	–	3	–	0	7	–	3	–	0
Iowa Lakes	1	–	4	–	0	5	–	5	–	0
NDSCS	1	–	4	–	0	4	–	5	–	0
$ – Conference champion

1990 Iowa Junior College Conference football standings
	Conf.					Overall
Team	W		L		T	W		L		T
Ellsworth $	5	–	0	–	0	7	–	1	–	1
North Iowa Area	4	–	1	–	0	8	–	2	–	0
NDSCS	3	–	2	–	0	5	–	4	–	0
Waldorf	2	–	3	–	0	4	–	5	–	0
Iowa Central	1	–	4	–	0	2	–	8	–	0
Iowa Lakes	0	–	5	–	0	1	–	8	–	0
$ – Conference champion

1993 Iowa Junior College Conference football standings
	Conf.					Overall
Team	W		L		T	W		L		T
North Iowa Area +	5	–	1	–	0	10	–	1	–	0
Waldorf +	5	–	1	–	0	8	–	2	–	0
Highland	4	–	2	–	0	7	–	3	–	0
Iowa Central	3	–	3	–	0	5	–	4	–	0
NDSCS	3	–	3	–	0	6	–	3	–	0
Ellsworth	1	–	5	–	0	2	–	7	–	0
Iowa Lakes	0	–	6	–	0	3	–	7	–	0
+ – Conference co-champions

1995 Iowa Junior College Conference football standings
	Conf.					Overall
Team	W		L		T	W		L		T
North Iowa Area $	6	–	0	–	0	8	–	3	–	0
Iowa Lakes	4	–	2	–	0	8	–	3	–	0
Waldorf	4	–	2	–	0	6	–	3	–	0
NDSCS	3	–	3	–	0	6	–	4	–	0
Highland	2	–	4	–	0	5	–	5	–	0
Iowa Central	2	–	4	–	0	4	–	6	–	0
Ellsworth	0	–	6	–	0	2	–	8	–	0
$ – Conference champion

1996 Iowa Junior College Conference football standings
	Conf.					Overall
Team	W		L		T	W		L		T
NDSCS $	5	–	0	–	0	9	–	1	–	0
Ellsworth	4	–	1	–	0	8	–	2	–	0
North Iowa Area	3	–	2	–	0	6	–	3	–	0
Iowa Central	2	–	3	–	0	5	–	5	–	0
Waldorf	1	–	4	–	0	3	–	7	–	0
Iowa Lakes	0	–	5	–	0	5	–	5	–	0
$ – Conference champion

1997 Iowa Community College Athletic Conference football standings
	Conf.			Overall
Team	W		L	W		L
Iowa Central $	4	–	0	7	–	2
Waldorf	3	–	1	8	–	3
NDSCS	2	–	2	6	–	3
Ellsworth	1	–	3	1	–	8
North Iowa Area	0	–	4	3	–	5
$ – Conference champion

1998 Iowa Community College Athletic Conference football standings
	Conf.			Overall
Team	W		L	W		L
Iowa Central $	6	–	2	8	–	3
North Iowa Area	5	–	3	8	–	3
Waldorf	4	–	4	5	–	5
NDSCS	3	–	5	4	–	5
Ellsworth	2	–	6	2	–	8
$ – Conference champion

1999 Iowa Community College Athletic Conference football standings
	Conf.			Overall
Team	W		L	W		L
NDSCS $	8	–	0	10	–	0
Iowa Central	5	–	3	8	–	3
Ellsworth	3	–	5	5	–	5
Waldorf	2	–	6	2	–	8
North Iowa Area	2	–	6	3	–	7
$ – Conference champion

2000 Iowa Community College Athletic Conference football standings
	Conf.			Overall
Team	W		L	W		L
North Iowa Area $	8	–	0	9	–	2
Iowa Central	4	–	4	6	–	5
Waldorf	3	–	5	4	–	6
NDSCS	3	–	5	3	–	6
Ellsworth	2	–	6	3	–	6
$ – Conference champion

2001 Iowa Community College Athletic Conference football standings
	Conf.			Overall
Team	W		L	W		L
North Iowa Area $	7	–	1	9	–	2
Iowa Central	6	–	2	7	–	3
Ellsworth	3	–	5	5	–	5
Waldorf	2	–	6	3	–	8
NDSCS	2	–	6	2	–	7
$ – Conference champion

2002 Iowa Community College Athletic Conference football standings
	Conf.			Overall
Team	W		L	W		L
Iowa Central $	7	–	1	8	–	3
North Iowa Area	5	–	3	7	–	3
NDSCS	5	–	3	6	–	5
Ellsworth	3	–	5	3	–	6
Waldorf	0	–	8	0	–	11
$ – Conference champion

2003 Iowa Community College Athletic Conference football standings
	Conf.			Overall
Team	W		L	W		L
Iowa Central $	6	–	0	10	–	1
Ellsworth	4	–	2	6	–	4
NDSCS	1	–	5	4	–	6
North Iowa Area	1	–	5	2	–	7
$ – Conference champion

2004 Iowa Community College Athletic Conference football standings
	Conf.			Overall
Team	W		L	W		L
No. 11 Ellsworth +	4	–	2	8	–	3
Iowa Central +	4	–	2	7	–	4
North Iowa Area	3	–	3	5	–	4
NDSCS	1	–	5	5	–	5
+ – Conference co-champions; Rankings from NJCAA Poll

2014 Iowa Community College Athletic Conference football standings
	Conf.			Overall
Team	W		L	W		L
Iowa Western $	2	–	0	11	–	1
Iowa Central	1	–	1	5	–	7
Ellsworth	0	–	2	4	–	7
$ – Conference champion

2015 Iowa Community College Athletic Conference football standings
	Conf.			Overall
Team	W		L	W		L
No. 3 Iowa Western $	2	–	0	10	–	2
No. 18 Ellsworth	1	–	1	7	–	5
Iowa Central	0	–	2	2	–	8
$ – Conference champion; Rankings from NJCAA poll

2016 Iowa Community College Athletic Conference football standings
	Conf.			Overall
Team	W		L	W		L
Iowa Western $	2	–	0	6	–	6
Ellsworth	1	–	1	6	–	6
Iowa Central	0	–	2	0	–	11
$ – Conference champion

2017 Iowa Community College Athletic Conference football standings
	Conf.			Overall
Team	W		L	W		L
No. 2 Iowa Western $	2	–	0	11	–	1
Ellsworth	1	–	1	4	–	8
Iowa Central	0	–	2	1	–	10
$ – Conference champion; Rankings from NJCAA poll

2018 Iowa Community College Athletic Conference football standings
	Conf.			Overall
Team	W		L	W		L
No. 3 Iowa Western $	2	–	0	10	–	1
No. 13 Iowa Central	1	–	1	8	–	4
Ellsworth	0	–	2	2	–	9
$ – Conference champion; Rankings from NJCAA poll

2019 Iowa Community College Athletic Conference football standings
	Conf.			Overall
Team	W		L	W		L
No. 18 Iowa Central $	2	–	0	7	–	6
No. 4 Iowa Western	1	–	1	9	–	3
Ellsworth	0	–	2	2	–	9
$ – Conference champion; Rankings from NJCAA poll

2020–21 Iowa Community College Athletic Conference football standings
	Conf.			Overall
Team	W		L	W		L
No. 4 Iowa Western $	4	–	0	7	–	1
No. 10 Iowa Central	2	–	2	6	–	3
Ellsworth	0	–	4	2	–	6
$ – Conference champion; Rankings from NJCAA poll

2021 Iowa Community College Athletic Conference football standings
	Conf.			Overall
Team	W		L	W		L
No. 2 Iowa Western $^	4	–	0	10	–	1
No. 7 Iowa Central	2	–	2	9	–	2
Ellsworth	0	–	4	2	–	8
$ – Conference champion; ^ – NJCAA Division I playoff participant; Rankings from NJCAA Division I poll

2022 Iowa Community College Athletic Conference football standings
	Conf.			Overall
Team	W		L	W		L
No. 1 Iowa Western $^	2	–	0	10	–	2
No. 10 Iowa Central	1	–	1	7	–	4
Ellsworth	0	–	2	0	–	10
$ – Conference champion; ^ – NJCAA Division I playoff participant; Rankings from NJCAA Division I poll

2023 Iowa Community College Athletic Conference football standings
	Conf.			Overall
Team	W		L	W		L
No. 1 Iowa Western $^	2	–	0	12	–	1
No. 7 Iowa Central	1	–	1	7	–	4
Ellsworth	0	–	2	2	–	9
$ – Conference champion; ^ – NJCAA Division I playoff participant; Rankings from NJCAA Division I poll

2024 Iowa Community College Athletic Conference football standings
	Conf.			Overall
Team	W		L	W		L
No. 2 Iowa Western $^	2	–	0	11	–	2
Iowa Central	1	–	1	6	–	6
Ellsworth	0	–	2	1	–	10
$ – Conference champion; ^ – NJCAA Division I playoff participant; Rankings from NJCAA Division I poll

2025 Iowa Community College Athletic Conference football standings
	Conf.			Overall
Team	W		L	W		L
No. 1 Iowa Western $^	2	–	0	12	–	1
No. 9 Iowa Central	1	–	1	8	–	4
Ellsworth	0	–	2	3	–	7
$ – Conference champion; ^ – NJCAA Division I playoff participant; Rankings from NJCAA Division I poll
