= Iowa Central Community College =

Community college in Fort Dodge, Iowa, U.S.

- Type: Public community college
- Established: 1966
- President: Jesse Ulrich
- Students: 5,001
- Location: Fort Dodge, Iowa, United States; 42.488684°N 94.203989°W
- Campus: Town, remote from an urban area
- Colors: Navy, White
- Nickname: Tritons
- Website: www.iowacentral.edu

Iowa Central Community College is a public community college in Fort Dodge, Iowa, United States. It has satellite campuses in Webster City and Storm Lake.

== History ==
The college was organized in 1966 on the foundation of three area junior colleges which had been operating since the 1920s by the local public school systems. These three colleges were in Fort Dodge, organized in 1921; Webster City, 1926; and Eagle Grove, 1928. Iowa Central came into being as a result of the Area School Act passed by Iowa's 61st General Assembly. The legislation authorized two or more county school systems to merge to form an area community college. Nine counties combined to create Iowa Central: Buena Vista, Calhoun, Greene, Hamilton, Humboldt, Pocahontas, Sac, Webster and Wright. The resulting Merged Area V has some 28,000 students in 31 public school districts. In 1971, a fourth center was added with the completion of a new building in Storm Lake. The Storm Lake Center originally was established to serve 12 public and private school systems in Buena Vista County as a secondary career education center. In the ensuing years, the Storm Lake Center has been expanded so that now it offers the full range of community college programs.

In 1975, Iowa Central joined with Buena Vista College in Storm Lake in a cooperative venture whereby students can earn a bachelor's degree attending evening classes. The students' first two years are completed at Iowa Central and the final two years at Buena Vista at the Fort Dodge Center.

== Academics ==
Iowa Central Community College students can obtain two year degrees in various fields. For an Associate of Arts degree, there are more than 50 majors the school offers including accounting, journalism, and social work. For an Associate of Applied Science, there are over 30 majors students can choose from such as diesel technology, fire science, and television and radio production. Iowa Central also offers other diploma programs including carpentry, culinary arts, industrial mechanics, and more.

== Athletics ==
The Iowa Central Tritons compete in the National Junior College Athletic Association (NJCAA) as a member the Iowa Community College Athletic Conference (ICCAC). Iowa Central boasts 40 national championships across the different sports in which they compete.

Sport	Championship years
Football	1978
Wrestling	1981, 2002, 2006, 2007, 2008, 2009, 2015, 2017
Men's cross country	2015
Women's cross country	2007, 2008, 2011, 2012, 2013
Men's half marathon	2007, 2011, 2012, 2014, 2016
Women's half marathon	2011, 2012, 2016
Men's indoor track and field	2011, 2012, 2014, 2015, 2016, 2017
Women's indoor track and field	2010, 2012, 2014, 2015, 2016, 2017
Women's outdoor track and field	2013, 2015, 2016
Women's soccer	2015
Men's nowling	2017
Men's rugby	2018, 2019

== Notable alumni ==
- Tyji Armstrong, professional football player
- Daryl Beall, politician
- Adva Cohen, runner
- Colby Covington, professional mixed martial artist
- Cyrus Fees, professional mixed martial artist and professional wrestling TV announcer
- Jon Jones, college wrestler and professional mixed martial artist
- Stanley Kebenei, distance runner
- Drew McFedries, professional mixed martial artist
- Terell Parks (born 1991), professional basketball player
- Maddie Poppe, vocalist
- Leicy Santos, professional soccer player
- Joe Soto, college wrestler and mixed martial artist
- Pita Gus Sowakula, professional rugby union player
- Amari Spievey, professional football player
- Troy Stedman, professional football player
- Cain Velasquez, college wrestler and professional mixed martial artist
