= List of 3C2A Championship records in track and field =

This is a list of the meet records from the annual California Community College Athletic Association Championships.

== Men ==
| Event | Record | Athlete | School | Date | Place |
|---|---|---|---|---|---|
| 100 m | 9.93 | Kemarley Brown Jamaica | Merritt College | 5/17/2014 | Mt. SAC |
| 200 m | 20.29 | Kemarley Brown Jamaica | Merritt College | 5/17/2014 | Mt. SAC |
| 400 m | 44.91 | Tyree Washington | San Bernardino | 5/17/1997 | Fresno City College |
| 800 m | 1:46.97 | Lorenzo Brown | Mira Costa College | 5/17/1986 | Mt. SAC |
| 1500 m | 3:41.76 | Noureddine Morceli Algeria | Riverside | 5/18/1989 | Santa Barbara City College |
| 5000 m | 14:10.40 | Vicken Simonian | Los Angeles | 5/31/1976 | Bakersfield College |
| 10,000 m | 29:39.31 | Wilhelm Gidabuday Tanzania | Riverside | 5/21/1999 | City College of San Francisco |
| 110 m hurdles | 13.64 | Larry Harrington | Taft College | 5/16/1992 | Long Beach City College |
| 400 m hurdles | 50.07 | Greg Johnson | Mt. SAC | 5/22/1982 | Bakersfield College |
| 3000 m steeplechase | 8:53.20 | Shannon Laird | Palomar College | 5/28/1977 | Bakersfield College |
| High jump | 7 ft 5 1/4 in (2.26 m) | Milton Goode | Alameda | 5/30/1981 | Cerritos College |
| Pole vault | 17 ft 6 in (5.33 m) | Ralph Preiman; Doug Wicks | Foothill College; Bakersfield College | 5/22/1982; 5/26/1984 | Bakersfield College |
| Long jump | 26 ft 2 3/4 in (7.99 m) | Kenneth Hays | Pasadena | 5/27/1978 | Bakersfield College |
| Triple jump | 54 ft 3 1/4 in (16.54 m) | Bryon Criddle | Contra Costa | 5/22/1982 | Bakersfield College |
| Shot put | 65 ft 4 in (19.91 m) | Hank Kraychir | Long Beach | 5/22/1982 | Bakersfield College |
| Discus throw | 196 ft 7 in (59.91 m) | Robert Slowik | Moorpark | 5/15/2004 | Bakersfield College |
| Hammer throw | 209 ft 11 in (63.98 m) | Robert Slowik | Moorpark | 5/15/2004 | Bakersfield College |
| Javelin throw | 222-00 | Cooper Thompson | Bakersfield | 5/15/2009 | College of San Mateo |
| Decathlon | 7478 pts | Doug Fernandez | Long Beach | 5/21/1983 | Modesto Junior College |
| 4 × 100 m relay | 39.01 | Bacon, Townsend, Goodlow, Davis | Taft College | 5/21/1988 | Bakersfield College |
| 4 × 400 m relay | 3:06.03 | Taylor, Chambers, Swift, Maye | Sacramento City College | 5/21/1994 | Cerritos College |

== Women ==
| Event | Record | Athlete | School | Date | Place |
|---|---|---|---|---|---|
| 100 m | 11.23 | Zelda Johnson | Mt. SAC | 5/26/1984 | Bakersfield College |
| 200 m | 22.86 | Ashton Purvis | Laney College | 5/19/2012 | Cerritos College |
| 400 m | 52.69 | Gwen Gardner | West Los Angeles College | 5/30/1981 | Sacramento City College |
| 800 m | 2:06.30 | Dawn Williams | Riverside | 5/21/1994 | Cerritos College |
| 1500 m | 4:18.10 | Sylvia Mosqueda | East Los Angeles College | 5/16/1986 | Mt. SAC |
| 5000 m | 15:52.50 | Sylvia Mosqueda | East Los Angeles College | 5/16/1986 | Mt. SAC |
| 10,000 m | 35:31.92 | Aminat Olowara Nigeria | Southwestern College | 5/15/2015 | College of San Mateo |
| 100 m hurdles | 13.46 | Candise Maxwell | Laney College | 5/17/2008 | Cerritos College |
| 400 m hurdles | 58.88 | Celana Clarke | Riverside | 5/20/1995 | Bakersfield College |
| 3000 m steeplechase | 10:44.46 | Cassie Mitchell | Orange Coast College | 5/18/2009 | College of San Mateo |
| High jump | 5 ft 10 1/2 in (1.79 m) | Janine Bonin | San Joaquin Delta | 5/21/1988 | Bakersfield College |
| Pole vault | 12 ft 10 1/4 in (3.91 m) | Dimara Planell-Cruz | San Jose | 5/18/2013 | College of San Mateo |
| Long jump | 21 ft 3 1/2 in (6.48 m) | Shella Nicks; Christy Opara Nigeria | Sequoias; Citrus College | 5/21/1983; 5/19/1990 | Modesto Junior College Santa Barbara City College |
| Triple jump | 42 ft 6 1/4 in (12.96 m) | Juanita Webster | Cerritos College | 5/20/2017 | American River College |
| Shot put | 55 ft 3 3/4 in (16.85 m) | Grace Apiafi Nigeria | Mt. SAC | 5/19/1990 | Santa Barbara City College |
| Discus throw | 168 ft 3 in (51.28 m) | Samantha Gutierrez | Riverside | 5/21/2010 | Antelope Valley College |
| Hammer throw | 195 ft 10 in (59.69 m) | Jessika Byrd | Riverside | 5/17/2013 | College of San Mateo |
| Javelin throw | 162 ft 7 in (49.55 m) | Melody Harris | Fresno City College | 5/18/2016 | San Diego Mesa College |
| Heptathlon | 5424 pts | Juanita Webster | Cerritos College | 5/20/2017 | American River College |
| 4 × 100 m relay | 45.02 | Hunte, Woodley, Maxwell, Anthony | Laney College | 5/17/2008 | Cerritos College |
| 4 × 400 m relay | 3:37.75 | Seville, Mayberry, Hemmans, Cabell | El Camino College | 5/17/1984 | Bakersfield College |
