= List of junior college track and field records in the United States =

This is a list of records in the sport of track and field at the junior college level in the United States. The national governing body of athletics at that level is the National Junior College Athletic Association (NJCAA). However, the California Community College system, the largest in the country with over 100 institutions, is not a member of the NJCAA, instead governing its sports through the unaffiliated California Community College Athletic Association (CCCAA). Merging the records between these organizations has been left to the independent publication Track and Field News (T&FN) primarily in the person of Robert Hersh, who also supervises records for USA Track and Field (USATF).

Starting in the 1970s, many community colleges began recruiting foreign born athletes. With some of the best athletes in the world competing against American college freshmen and sophomores, an additional set of records for the best American born athletes was also included. T&FN was not 100% accurate when assessing which athletes are not Americans They were not given assistance by the colleges, who tended not to discuss the foreign roots of some of their recruits. Additionally, with the less restrictive eligibility regulations (as compared to the very strict NCAA regulations), foreign born athletes could be older than the 18- to 20-year-old Americans who entered community college immediately following high school.

All of these records appear to be exclusively from Community College level competition, as opposed to the means T&FN uses in calculating High School records, where they allow all attempts by a high school affiliated athlete made against Open level competitors.

== Men ==
Key: Awaiting ratification Record by American-born athlete
' after name = non-U.S. citizen (A) = altitude-aided mark--over 1000m of altitude (in affected events only) i = made indoors (banked-track marks not acceptable)

| Event | Record | Athlete | School | Date | Meet | Place | Ref. |
|---|---|---|---|---|---|---|---|
| 100 m | 9.93 (+1.8 m/s) | Kemarley Brown' (Jamaica) | Merritt College | 17 May 2014 | Walnut CCCAA State Championships | Walnut, California | |
| 100 m | 10.05 (+1.9 m/s) | Ryan Bailey | Rend Lake College | 22 May 2009 | Hutchinson NJCAA Championships | Hutchinson, Kansas | |
| 200 m | 19.79 A (+1.3 m/s) | James Dadzie' | Western Texas | 29 April 2023 | Corky/Crofoot Shootout | Lubbock, Texas | |
| 400 m | 44.52 | Tyree Washington | San Bernardino Valley College | 3 May 1997 | | Bakersfield, California | |
| 800 m | 1:45.15 | Boaz Kiplagat Lalang' (Kenya) | Rend Lake College | 9 May 2008 | Eugene Oregon Twilight | Eugene, Oregon | |
| 800 m | 1:46.60 | George Kersh | Taft College | 22 April 1989 | Mt. SAC Relays | Walnut, California | |
| 1500 m | 3:37.62 | Boaz Kiplagat Lalang' (Kenya) | Rend Lake College | 26 April 2008 | Hillsdale Gina Relays | Hillsdale, Michigan | |
| 1500 m | (unknown) | | | | | | |
| Mile | 4:00.0 h | Reggie McAfee | Brevard Community College | 16 April 1971 | | Philadelphia, Pennsylvania | |
| 3000 m steeplechase | 8:29.4 h | Julius Kariuki' (Kenya) | Riverside City College | | Walnut, California | 4/23/88 | |
| 3000 m steeplechase | 8:49.7 h | Nathan Morris | Lane Community College | | Eugene, Oregon | 5/14/83 | |
| 5000 m | 13:25.20 | Noureddine Morceli' (Algeria) | Riverside City College | | Walnut, California | 4/21/90 | |
| 5000 m | 13:59.20 | Mark Ruelas | Citrus College | | Bakersfield, California | 5/15/82 | |
| 10,000 m | 28:35.0 | Mark Roberts' (United Kingdom) | Central Arizona College | | Walnut, California | 4/25/87 | |
| 10,000 m | 29:03.0 | Kirk Pfeffer | Grossmont College | | Irvine, California | 3/28/76 | |
| 110 m hurdles | 13.32 | Ryan Brathwaite' (Barbados) | Barton Community College | | Austin, Texas | 4/04/09 | |
| 400 m hurdles | 49.29 | Eric Thomas | Blinn College | | Odessa, Texas | 5/21/94 | |
| 4 × 100 m relay | 38.86 | Odessa College (Jon Drummond, James Law, Rodney Eleby, Pat Drake) | | | Odessa, Texas | 5/16/87 | |
| 4 × 200 m relay | 1:20.79 | Central Arizona College (Richard Butler, Garfield Campbell' (Jamaica) , Patrick O'Connor' (Jamaica) , Howard Davis' (Jamaica) ) | | | Walnut, California | 4/24/88 | |
4 × 400 m relay
| 4 × 400 m relay | 3:01.32 | South Plains College (Alistair Moona' (Canada) , Daniel Harper' (Canada) , Vernon Norwood, Bralon Taplin) | | | Lubbock, Texas | 5/05/12 | |
| 4 × 800 m relay | 7:19.24 | Blinn College (Jimmy Pierre-Louis 1:51.5, Jean Destine' (Haiti) 1:50.7, Cliff Beckford 1:51.3, Savieri Ngidhi' (Zimbabwe) 1:45.7) | | | Austin, Texas | 4/03/92 | |
| 4 × 1500 m relay | 15:41.66 | Blinn College (Junior Mitchell 3:55.1, Godfrey Siamusiye' (Zambia) 3:52.5, Richie Dikstall 3:54.8, Herbert Habyarimana' (Rwanda) 3:59.3) | | | Brenham, Texas | 4/20/94 | |
| 4 × mile relay | 16:31.0 | Allegheny College (Tarald Lindvigsmoen' (Norway) 4:08.6, Malcolm East' (United Kingdom) 4:06.4, Amos Korir' (Kenya) 4:00.2, James Rotich' (Kenya) 4:15.8) | | | Knoxville, Tennessee | 4/14/78 | |
| Sprint medley relay | 3:12.67 | Blinn College (James Dibble, Jason Hendrix, LaMont Smith 45.7, Savieri Ngidhi' (Zimbabwe) 1:45.9) | | | Austin, Texas | 4/02/93 | |
| Distance medley relay | 9:41.65 | Ranger College (Ricky Roberts, George Bullard, Zak Gwandu' (Tanzania) , Pat Chester') | | | Austin, Texas | 4/05/85 | |
| 4×110 hurdles relay | 56.52 | Blinn College (Henrik Dagård' (Sweden) , Rory Norris, Brian Richardson, Kevin White) | | | Lafayette, Louisiana | 3/27/93 | |
| High jump | 2.34 m (7 ft 8 in) | Dennis Lewis | Long Beach City College | | Los Angeles, California | 3/30/85 | |
| Pole vault | 5.49 m (18 ft 0 in) | Dason Phelps | Paradise Valley Community College | | Glendale, Arizona | 3/18/00 | |
| Long jump | 8.20 m (26 ft 10 3/4 in) | Vernon George | Odessa College | | Odessa, Texas | 5/17/85 | |
| Triple jump | 17.92 m (58 ft 9 1/2 in) | James Beckford' Jamaica | Blinn College | | Odessa, Texas | 5/20/95 | |
| Triple jump | 17.07 m (56 ft 0 in) | Walter Davis | Barton Community College | | Baton Rouge, Louisiana | 5/19/00 | |
| Shot put | 21.35 m (70 ft 1/2 in) | Ron Semkiw | Mesa Community College | | Mesa, Arizona | 3/05/74 | |
| Discus throw | 64.22 m (210 ft 8 1/4 in) | Andrey Kokhanovskiy' (Russia) | Blinn College | | Pasadena, Texas | 4/26/95 | |
| Discus throw | 63.23 m (207 ft 5 1/4 in) | Brian Williams | Iowa Central Community College | | Mt. Vernon, Iowa | 4/26/86 | |
| Hammer throw | 66.61 m (218 ft 6 1/4 in) | Branislav Daniš' (Slovenia) | Central Arizona College | | Mesa, Arizona | 5/08/07 | |
| Hammer throw | 66.26 m (217 ft 4 1/2 in) | Remy Conatser | Saddleback College | | Los Angeles, California | 4/07/12 | |
| Javelin throw | 75.72 m (248 ft 5 in) | Tom Pukstys | College of DuPage | | Tallahassee, Florida | 3/18/88 | |
| Decathlon | 7532 | David Lemen | Clackamas Community College | | Spokane, Washington | 5/1-2/00 | |
| Decathlon | 100m / Long jump / Shot put / High jump / 400m / 110m H / Discus / Pole vault / Javelin / 1500m; 11.46 / 7.26 m 23'10" / 12.31 m 40'4¾" / 1.99 m 6'6¼" / 50.95 [3827] / 15.09 / 36.40 m 119'5" / 5.05 m 16'6¾" / 59.90 m 196'6" / 4:51.16 [3705]) | | | | | | |

== Women ==
| Event | Record | Athlete | School | Place | Date | Ref. |
|---|---|---|---|---|---|---|
| 100 m | 11.12 | Natasha Mayers (Saint Vincent and the Grenadines) | LA Southwest College | Walnut, California | 5/12/01 | |
| 100 m | 11.23 | Zelda Johnson | Mt. San Antonio College | Bakersfield, California | 5/26/84 | |
| 200 m | 22.39 | Veronica Campbell (Jamaica) | Barton Community College | Odessa, Texas | 5/18/02 | |
| 200 m | 22.86 | Ashton Purvis | Laney College | Norwalk, California | 19 May 2012 | |
| 400 m | 50.92 | Sandie Richards (Jamaica) | San Jacinto College | Odessa, Texas | 5/16/87 | |
| 400 m | 52.68 | Gwen Gardner | West Los Angeles College | Westwood, California | 5/16/82 | |
| 800 m | 2:01.92 | Claudine Williams (Jamaica) | Barton Community College | Edwardsville, Illinois | 5/16/98 | |
| 800 m | 2:03.9 | Ruth Wysocki | Citrus College | Fresno, California | 5/06/78 | |
| 1500 m | 4:17.82 | Sylvia Mosqueda | East Los Angeles College | Stanford, California | 3/29/86 | |
| 3000 m | 9:13.0 h | Trina Painter | Phoenix College | Walnut, California | 4/26/86 | |
| 3000 m steeplechase | | | | | | |
| 5000 m | 15:52.5 h | Sylvia Mosqueda | East Los Angeles College | Walnut, California | 5/16/86 | |
10,000 m
| 10,000 m | 34:29.36 | Jessica Mildes | Community Colleges of Spokane | Walnut, California | 4/17/14 | |
| 100 hurdles | 13.13 | Nichole Belcher | Essex County College | Odessa, Texas | 5/20/95 | |
| 400 hurdles | 56.92 | Tanya Jarrett (Jamaica) | Central Arizona College | Walnut, California | 4/20/97 | |
| 400 hurdles | 58.96 | Margaret Hemmans | El Camino College | Bakersfield, California | 5/26/84 | |
| High jump | 1.86 m (6 ft 1 in) | Shaunette Davidson (Jamaica) | Barton Community College | Levelland, Texas | 5/08/04 | |
| High jump | 1.83 m (6 ft 0 in) | Phyllis Bluntson | El Camino College | Bakersfield, California | 5/16/79 | |
| High jump | 1.83 m (6 ft 0 in) | Kathy Raugust | Hartnell College | Porterville, California | 5/10/81 | |
| High jump | 1.83 m (6 ft 0 in) | Shenell Searcy | Odessa College | Odessa, Texas | 5/18/91 | |
| High jump | 1.83 m (6 ft 0 in) | Hyleas Fountain | Barton Community College | Odessa, Texas | 5/16/02 | |
| Pole vault | 14 ft 4 in (4.36 m) | Becky Holliday | Clackamas Community College | Spokane, Washington | 5/24/01 | |
| Long jump | 22-6¼ | Elva Goulbourne (Jamaica) | Central Arizona College | Tucson, Arizona | 5/03/01 | |
| Long jump | 21-3½ | Sheila Nicks | College of the Sequoias | Modesto, California | 5/21/83 | |
| Triple jump | 46-3½ | Yuliana Perez | Pima Community College | Odessa, Texas | 5/18/02 | |
| Shot put | 55-3¾ | Grace Apiafi (Nigeria) | Mt. San Antonio College | Santa Barbara, California | 5/19/90 | |
| Shot put | 16.31 m (53 ft 6 in) | Janeah Stewart | Iowa Central Community College | Des Moines, Iowa | 4/30/16 | |
| Discus throw | 183-2 | Ilona Rutges | Central Arizona College | Tucson, Arizona | 3/16/02 | |
| Discus throw | 181-2 | Stacy Ainlay | Glendale Community College | Odessa, Texas | 5/16/91 | |
| Hammer throw | 61.70 m (202 ft 5 in) | Jessika Byrd | Riverside City College | Antelope Valley, California | 4 May 2013 | |
| Javelin throw | 169-5 | Trina Rogers | Clackamas Community College | Eugene, Oregon | 5/27/99 | |
| Heptathlon | 5687 pts | Lisa Wright (Jamaica) | Barton Community College | Odessa, Texas | 5/15-16/96 | |
| Heptathlon | 100m H / High jump / Shot put / 200m / Long jump / Javelin / 800m; 14.44 / 1.77 m 5'9 ¾" / 10.80 m 35'5¼" / 24.73 [3352] / 6.27 m 20'7" / 41.08 m 134'9" / 2:28.41 [2335] | | | | | |
| Heptathlon | 5673 pts | Hyleas Fountain | Barton Community College | Odessa, Texas | 5/16-17/02 | |
| Heptathlon | 100m H / High jump / Shot put / 200m / Long jump / Javelin / 800m; 13.78w / 1.83 m 6'0" / 10.30 m 33'9½" / 23.54w [3591] / 6.15 m 20'2¼"w / 33.90 m 111'3" / 2:34.74 [2082] | | | | | |
| 4 × 100 m relay | 43.83 | Barton Community College (Dionne Rose (Jamaica) , Juliet Campbell (Jamaica) , Beverly McDonald (Jamaica) , Cheryl Ann Phillips (Jamaica) ) | | Austin, Texas | 4/05/91 | |
| 4 × 200 m relay | 1:33.63 | Barton Community College (Natalee Sterling (Jamaica) , Sonia Williams (Antigua and Barbuda) , Mikessis Triplett, Aleen Bailey (Jamaica) ) | | Lawrence, Kansas | 4/21/00 | |
| 4 × 400 m relay | 3:30.66 | San Jacinto College (Jackie Gayle (Jamaica) 52.0, Karlene Haughton (Jamaica) 52.2, Avia Morgan (Jamaica) 53.3, Lorieann Adams (Guyana) 53.2) | | Austin, Texas | 5/08/92 | |
| 4 × 800 m relay | 8:37.75 | Barton Community College (Nancy Torres 2:15.0, Karen Bennett Jamaica 2:08.5, Mardrea Hyman Jamaica 2:09.5, Inez Turner Jamaica 2:04.8) | | Austin, Texas | 4/03/93 | |
| Sprint Medley Relay (1-1-2-4) | 1:38.93 | San Jacinto College (Karlene Haughton (Jamaica) , Avia Morgan (Jamaica) , Merlene Frazer (Jamaica) 22.6, Lorieann Adams (Guyana) 51.5) | | Austin, Texas | 4/03/93 | |
| Sprint Medley Relay (2-2-4-8) | 3:46.37 | San Jacinto College (Andrea Giscombe (Jamaica) 24.0, Avia Morgan (Jamaica) 23.5, Ellen Grant (Jamaica) 52.3, Lorrieann Adams (Guyana) 2:06.6) | | Austin, Texas | 4/09/94 | |
| Distance Medley Relay | 11:37.17y | Barton Community College (Inez Turner (Jamaica) , Karen Bennett (Jamaica) , Janice Turner (Jamaica) , Mardrea Hyman (Jamaica) ) | | Lawrence, Kansas | 4/17/93 | |

== See also ==
- List of CCCAA Championship records in track and field
