= A Boy and His Dog (1975 film) =

1975 American film by L.Q. Jones

- Theatrical release poster
- Directed by: L.Q. Jones
- Screenplay by: L.Q. Jones
- Based on: A Boy and His Dog; 1969 novella by Harlan Ellison
- Produced by: Alvy Moore
- Starring: Don Johnson; Susanne Benton; Alvy Moore; Jason Robards
- Cinematography: John Arthur Morrill
- Edited by: Scott Conrad
- Music by: Tim McIntire; Jaime Mendoza-Nava
- Production company: LQ/Jaf Productions
- Distributed by: LQ/Jaf Productions
- Release dates: March 15, 1975 (Filmex Festival, Los Angeles)
- Running time: 91 minutes
- Country: United States
- Language: English
- Budget: $400,000

A Boy and His Dog is a 1975 American science fiction black comedy film written and directed by L.Q. Jones, based on the 1969 novella of the same name by author Harlan Ellison. The film stars Don Johnson, Susanne Benton, Alvy Moore, and Jason Robards. It was independently produced and distributed by Jones' company LQ/Jaf Productions. The film's storyline concerns a teenage boy, Vic, and his telepathic dog, Blood, who work together as a team in order to survive in the dangerous post-apocalyptic wasteland of the Southwestern United States. Shout! Factory released the film on DVD and Blu-ray in August 2013.

== Plot ==
In the post-nuclear United States of 2024, Vic is an 18-year-old boy, born in and scavenging throughout the wasteland of the former southwestern United States. Vic is most concerned with food and sex; having lost his parents, he has no formal education and does not understand ethics or morality. He is accompanied by a well-read, misanthropic, telepathic dog named Blood, who helps him find women to rape, in exchange for which Vic finds food for the dog. Blood cannot forage for himself due to the same genetic engineering that granted him telepathy. The two steal for a living, evading bands of raiders, berserk military androids and mutants. Blood and Vic have an occasionally antagonistic relationship (Blood frequently annoys Vic by calling him "Albert," after the wholesome writer about dogs Albert Payson Terhune), though they realize that they need each other to survive. Blood wishes to find the legendary promised land of "Over the Hill" where above-ground utopias are said to exist, though Vic believes that they must make the best of what they have.

Searching a bunker for a woman for Vic to rape, they find one but she has already been severely mutilated and is on the verge of death. Vic displays no pity. He is merely angered by the "wastefulness" of such an act, as well as disgusted by the thought of satisfying his urges with a woman in such a condition. They move on, only to find slavers excavating another bunker. Vic steals several cans of their food, later using them to barter for goods in a nearby shanty town.

That evening, while watching old vintage stag films at a local outdoor "cinema", Blood claims to smell a woman, and the pair track her to a large underground warehouse. There, Vic attempts to rape Quilla June Holmes, a scheming and seductive teenage girl from Downunder, a society in a large underground settlement. Unknown to the pair, Quilla June's father, Lou Craddock, had sent her above ground to "recruit" surface dwellers. Blood takes an instant dislike to her, but Vic ignores him. After Vic saves Quilla June from raiders and mutants, they repeatedly have sex. Eventually, she secretly returns to her underground society. Enticed by the thought of more women and sex, Vic follows her, despite Blood's warnings. Blood remains on the surface at Downunder's portal.

Downunder has an artificial biosphere, complete with forests and a city, which is named Topeka after the ruins of the destroyed city that it lies beneath. The city is ruled by a triumvirate known as the Committee, who have shaped Topeka into a bizarre caricature of pre-nuclear war United States, with all residents wearing whiteface and clothes evocative of rural United States prior to World War II. When Vic is told that he has been brought to Topeka to help fertilize the female population, he is elated to learn of his "stud" value. His joy is short-lived, when he is informed that Topeka meets its need for exogamous reproduction by electroejaculation and artificial insemination, which will deny him the sexual pleasure that he had envisioned. People who refuse to comply with the Committee are sent off to "the farm" and never seen again, as they are murdered. Vic is informed that when his semen has been used to impregnate 35 women, he will also be sent to "the farm".

Quilla June helps Vic escape only because she wants him to kill the Committee members and destroy their android enforcer, Michael, so that she can usurp their power. Vic has no interest in politics or remaining underground. He only wants to return to Blood and the wasteland. The rebellion is quashed by Michael, who crushes the heads of Quilla June's co-conspirators before Vic disables him. She proclaims her "love" for Vic and wants to escape to the surface with him—now that her rebellion has been quashed, and the Committee has decreed that she will be sent to the farm.

On the surface, Vic and Quilla June discover that Blood is starving and near death. She pleads with Vic to abandon Blood, forcing him to face his true feelings. Vic decides that his loyalties lie with his dog. Off-camera, Vic murders Quilla June and cooks her flesh so that Blood can eat and survive. Blood thanks Vic for the food, and they both comment on Quilla June. Vic says that it was her fault that she followed him, while Blood wryly jokes that she had marvelous judgment but did not have particularly "good taste." The boy and his dog continue to talk as they walk off together into the wasteland.

== Cast ==
- Don Johnson as Vic
- Tim McIntire as "Blood" (voice)
  - Tiger as Blood
- Susanne Benton as Quilla June Holmes
- Jason Robards as Lou Craddock
- Alvy Moore as Dr. Moore
- Helene Winston as "Mez" Smith
- Charles McGraw as Preacher
- Hal Baylor as Michael
- Ron Feinberg as Fellini
- Michael Rupert as Gery
- Don Carter as Ken
- Michael Hershman as Richard
- L.Q. Jones as Actor in Porno Film

== Production ==
Harlan Ellison wrote the original novella A Boy and His Dog and began an adaptation for film. In an interview, Harlan Ellison said: "When he [Blood] calls Vic 'Al' or 'Albert', he is referring to the Albert Payson Terhune dog stories, whereas a traditional boy and his dog relationship is turned upside down in this movie." Actor/director L.Q. Jones came onboard to write the script. Jones' own company, LQ/Jaf Productions (L.Q. Jones & Friends), independently produced the film. Distributors initially were reluctant to finance the production, so Jones raised $400,000 through family and business associates. The film was shot on location in the Mojave Desert outside of Barstow, California and at Arroyo Verde Park in Ventura, California.

James Cagney's voice was considered as the voice of Blood, but was dropped because it would have been too recognizable and prove to be a distraction. Eventually, after going through approximately 600 auditions, they settled on Tim McIntire, a veteran voice actor who also did most of the music for the film. Ray Manzarek (misspelled in the film credits as "Manzarec"), formerly of The Doors, was also among those credited for the score. McIntire sang the main theme. Bolivian composer Jaime Mendoza-Nava provided the music for the Topeka underground segment.

== Reception ==
On Rotten Tomatoes, the film has a 78% approval rating based on 36 reviews, with an average rating of 6.6/10. The site's consensus states: "An offbeat, eccentric black comedy, A Boy and His Dog features strong dialogue and an oddball vision of the future". On Metacritic the film has a score of 68% based on reviews from 10 critics, indicating "generally favorable" reviews.

Roger Ebert of the Chicago Sun-Times gave the film 2.5 stars out of a possible 4, writing that Ellison's novella "seemed almost to defy filming" but nonetheless Jones managed to offer "a sort of wacky success". Richard Eder of The New York Times wrote that the realistic world set up in the beginning and the underground community introduced later "don't really work together; their contrast, and a ridiculous ending, shatter the picture. And the talking dog chews up the pieces". Variety called the film "a turkey" and "an amateurish blend of redneck humor, chaotic fight scenes, and dimwitted philosophizing". Gene Siskel of the Chicago Tribune gave the film 1.5 stars out of 4 and wrote: "Rather than illuminate the present through a glance at a possible future, 'A Boy and His Dog' is simply a dim-witted collection of tired sex gags and anti-American imagery". Charles Champlin of the Los Angeles Times praised the film as "an offbeat delight" with performances that "have that comfortable naturalness often detectable when an actor is directing other actors". Gary Arnold of The Washington Post panned the film as a "shoddy, puerile science-fiction parable" that "mistakes juvenile facetiousness for wit and glorifies a juvenile concept of freedom, which means making it in the wild, away from such unmanly encumbrances as civilization and girls".

The film was not commercially successful at its release. It has since become a cult film and also inspired the video game series Fallout "on many levels, from underground communities of survivors to glowing mutants", according to Jess Heinig, a developer of the game. On the film's DVD audio commentary, Jones states that Ellison was generally pleased with the film, with the exception of some lines of dialogue. Ellison particularly objected to the film's final line, which did not originate from his original short story, in which Blood said of Quilla, "Well, I'd say she certainly had marvelous judgement, Albert, if not particularly good taste". Ellison referred to it as a "moronic, hateful chauvinist last line, which I despise".

The film has been accused of misogyny; the script included lines that were not in Ellison's original stories and that author Joanna Russ objected to in her essay "A Boy and his Dog: The final solution." Ellison did, however, accept that the ending remained popular with fans, saying: "I would have kept the original last line from the original story, which I think is much more human and beguiling than the sort of punchline that L.Q. Jones used. But L.Q. knew what he was doing in terms of the market, I suppose." On the other hand, Harlan also loved the movie (as stated in an interview conversation with L.Q. Jones on the Shout Factory Blu-ray); after Jones screened it to him, he said it was exactly what the story was supposed to be on screen. It was a few days after he brought up his problems, mostly concerning the way Blood talked about the girl during the locker room scene when they first meet.

== Accolades ==
The film won the 1976 Hugo Award for Best Dramatic Presentation at MidAmeriCon, the 34th World Science Fiction Convention in Kansas City, Missouri, located not far from the real Topeka, Kansas. Johnson won the Golden Scroll for Best Actor, which was shared with James Caan for his performance in Rollerball. In 2007, it ranked #96 on Rotten Tomatoes' "Journey Through Sci-Fi" (100 best-reviewed science fiction films).

== Legacy ==
According to L.Q. Jones, George Miller cited the 1975 film adaptation of A Boy and His Dog as an influence on the Mad Max films, particularly The Road Warrior (1981). The poster for this film decorates the room that the Eli character in The Book of Eli is held in by the Carnegie character. The 2024 television series Fallout refers to the film via the in-universe movie A Man and His Dog.

=== Sequel ===
There were rumors regarding a sequel, but it never materialized. On the film's Blu-ray audio commentary, L.Q. Jones states that he had started to write a script sequel to the film that would have picked up where the first film ended and featured a female warrior named Spike, and we would have seen this world through the eyes of a female instead of a male (this happens in Ellison's story, Blood's a Rover, when Blood partners with Spike after the ostensible death of Vic). Jones and Ellison reportedly collaborated on this short-lived effort, although Ellison said that such 'collaboration' never went beyond a short "what if?" conversation, and that any efforts were solely that of Jones.

According to Cult Movies 2, Jones had a sequel planned called A Girl and Her Dog, but the plan was scrapped when Tiger, the dog who portrayed Blood, died. In a December 2003 interview, Jones claimed that he had been repeatedly approached to make a sequel, but funding was always an issue. In 2018, Ellison's teleplay featuring Spike — the girl in the proposed A Girl and Her Dog film — was finally published. Blood's a Rover by Harlan Ellison, a "fix-up" novel, consisting of "Eggsucker" and "Run Spot, Run", two short stories from the 1970s and 1980s, as well as "A Boy and His Dog" (Ellison's novella) and an unproduced teleplay from the 1970s, "Blood's a Rover", was published in a limited number of hardcovers.

== See also ==
- List of American films of 1975
- List of American independent films
