= Bob Day (runner) =

American long-distance runner

Robert Winston "Bob" Day (October 31, 1944 – March 15, 2012) was an American long-distance runner who competed at the 1968 Mexico Olympics. He lettered and graduated from UCLA where he was on Jim Bush's track team, winning an individual NCAA Championship in the mile in 1965, with the team title following at the 1966 NCAA Men's Outdoor Track and Field Championships. Also while at UCLA, he became the 12th American to break four minutes for the mile in 1964, and held the school record (3:56.4) for 40 years. In 1965 he became an All-American when the UCLA Distance Medley Relay (Bob Frey, Dennis Breckow, Arnd Krüger, Bob Day) was faster than the World Record. He won the 1968 US Track & Field Senior National crown in the 5,000 meter event competing for the US Army team. Later in life, he was the first head coach of both the Cross Country and Track and Field programs at Beckman High School in Irvine. He began at Beckman in 2005, and won his first Pacific Coast League title in 2008. He died of bladder cancer at his home in Irvine, California, aged 67.
