= Jim Bush =

American track and field coach

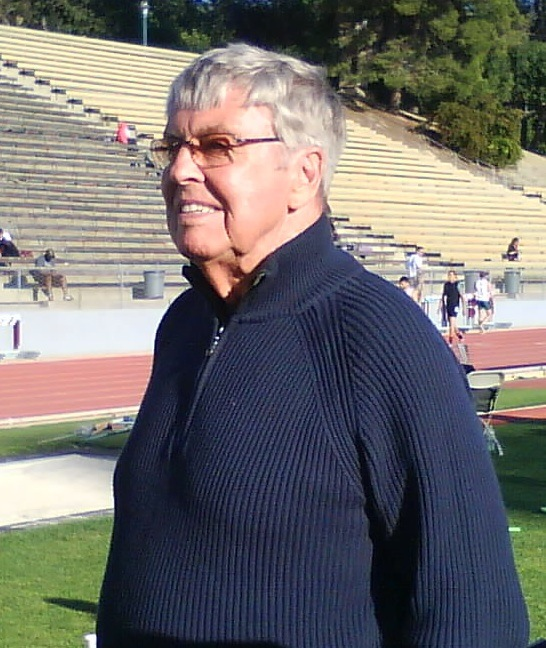
- Jim Bush at the 2011 Jim Bush Southern California USATF Championships at Mt. San Antonio College in Walnut, California

Biographical details
- Born: September 15, 1926; Cleveland, Ohio, U.S.
- Died: July 10, 2017 (aged 90); Culver City, California, U.S.
- Education: Bakersfield College; University of California

Coaching career (HC unless noted)
- 1952-1953: Berkeley High School
- 1954-1959: Fullerton Union High School
- 1959-1961: Fullerton College
- 1962: Occidental College
- 1991-1994: University of Southern California

James Stanley Bush (September 15, 1926 – July 10, 2017) was a National Track and Field Hall of Fame track and field coach. He was known primarily for his coaching tenure at the University of California, Los Angeles from 1964 to 1984. During that time, his teams won five NCAA Men's Outdoor Track and Field Championships (1966, 1971, 1972, 1973, 1978 (tied with UTEP) and he coached 30 Olympians.

Born in Cleveland, Ohio, he grew up in Bakersfield, California, a 1943 graduate of Kern County Union High School, he volunteered to serve in the Navy and was a Navy Aviator in South East Asia. After the War he went to Bakersfield College for two years, then on to the University of California, where he ran the 440 and high hurdles, graduating in 1951. Bush coached over a span of 43 years. He began at Berkeley High School in 1952 right out of college down the street. After a year, he was hired at Fullerton Union High School where he coached until 1959, when he moved down the street and up the ladder to Fullerton College where he turned the program from worst to first in its conference. His second year, his team won the Southern California and State title. In 1962, he was hired at Occidental College where he beat UCLA three years in a row. When UCLA's legendary coach Ducky Drake retired, Bush was recruited to be his replacement. In addition to the collegiate athletes, he worked with other individual athletes after leaving UCLA. He also was a speed advisor to Los Angeles professional teams including the Dodgers, Kings, Lakers and Raiders. His work with Raiders and their star Marcus Allen earned him a Super Bowl ring. He also has a World Series ring with the Dodgers baseball team and an NBA championship ring with the Lakers basketball team. He narrowly missed a National Hockey League ring with the Kings when they placed second place. In 1991, he returned to collegiate coaching at crosstown rival University of Southern California until he retired in 1994.

Among the athletes he coached in that time were Wayne Collett, John Smith, Benny Brown, Greg Foster, Willie Banks, John Brenner, Andre Phillips, David O. Carter, Arnd Krüger, Roger Johnson, Bob Day, and Quincy Watts. He famously kicked then world record holder Dwight Stones off of his team when Stones wanted to limit his participation to three meets. He was the head coach of the United States team at the 1979 Pan American Games.

He was elected into the TAC (now called the USATF) National Track and Field Hall of Fame in 1987. He is also a member of the Fullerton High School, Fullerton College, Kern County, Bakersfield College, Occidental College, UCLA, Mt. SAC Relays and the United States Track Coaches Association Halls of Fame (an organization he was previously president of). The Southern California Association USATF Championship meet is named in his honor, as is the championship award for the 110 metre hurdles at that meet.

Bush died of prostate cancer in Culver City, California on July 10, 2017, at the age of 90.
