= Tom Gamble =

Tom Gamble may refer to:

- Tom Gamble (athlete) (born 1991), Australian sprinter
- Tom Gamble (racing driver) (born 2001), British racing driver
