= Sylvia Mosqueda =

American long-distance runner

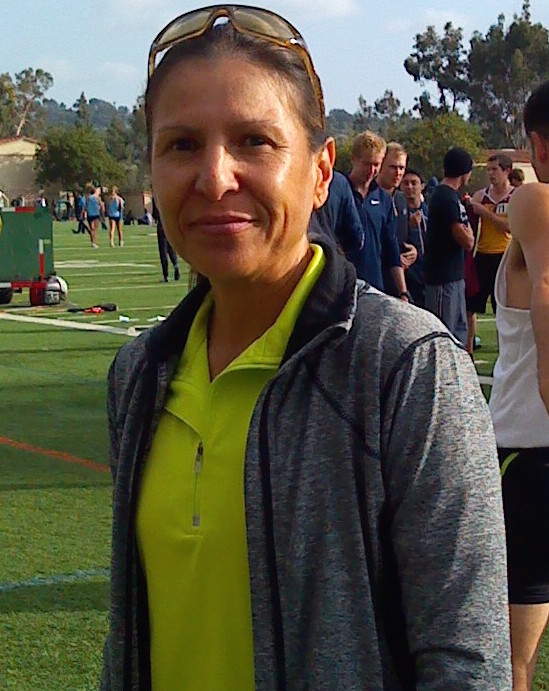

Medal record

Representing the United States

World Cross Country Championships
Silver medal – second place	1992 Boston	Women's team

Sylvia Mosqueda (born April 8, 1966 in Los Angeles, California) is an American long distance runner notable for hard front running over an extended career at an elite level.

== Early success ==
First as a high school athlete at San Gabriel High School she excelled in both Cross Country and Track, she then went to East Los Angeles College where she not only won the 800, 1500 and 5000, but set Community College records that have lasted over 20 years. and won the California Community College Cross Country Championships in record time. She first found national attention by accident, using the 1986 Los Angeles Marathon as a training run. The televised race focused on this unknown runner leading the way, far ahead of favorite Nancy Ditz, then suddenly dropping out almost 20 miles into the race. She had previously won the Run Across Los Angeles 10 mile race in similar fashion, just because it fell between her college seasons. Due to the notoriety from the previous year, Mosqueda again ran the 1987 L.A. Marathon, this time finishing the race in 2:37:46, good for 2nd place overall. That same year she also won the Philadelphia Distance Run Half-Marathon in 1:10:47. She was named California College Athletic Association "Female Athlete of the Year" for 1987-1988.

Next, Mosqueda went to Cal State Los Angeles, where she won the 1987 NCAA Cross Country Championship and at the 1988 NCAA Women's Outdoor Track and Field Championships won the 10,000 metres title, setting the NCAA national record of 32:28.57 in the process, a mark that stood for 30 years. As of 2015, she still holds the CSULA school records in all races from 800 meters to 10,000 meters. She was named the 1987 "Billie Jean King Woman of the Year. In 2007, she was selected into the Cal State L.A. Hall of Fame

== Olympic trials ==
Qualified by her L.A. Marathon run, she ran in the 1988 Olympic Marathon trials, darting to a minute and a half lead in the early stages. She paid the price for the early pace, being swallowed by the pack and dropping out exhausted at 18 miles. Her NCAA victory a few weeks later qualified her for the 10000 metres at the US Olympic Trials where she did not run at the same level, finishing 12th in the heats. In 1992, she again made the Olympic Trials in the 10000 metres, just missing the team by finishing in the deadly fourth place. 1996 looked to be her year. She qualified for the 10000 metres in her personal record of 31:54.03, set in the cool evening at the Mt. SAC Relays and was leading the Olympic Trials 10000 metres deep into the race before succumbing to the Atlanta heat and humidity, not finishing. In 2000, she made the Olympic Trials in the 10000 meters, finishing in a non-qualifying sixth place. At age 38, she again qualified for the 10000 metres at the 2004 Olympic trials, her fifth in a row. Earlier she also ran in the Marathon Olympic trials. She was the cover girl on the July 1991 issue of Running Times.

== Road racing ==
Sylvia has found her best success at the Half Marathon distance, where she won the 2001 National Championships. She was runner up in 2000. Those results put her on the US National team at the 2001 IAAF World Half Marathon Championships. She had further Half Marathon victories in the Austin Half Marathon and the America's Finest City Half Marathon. She set her personal record of 2:33:47 in the Marathon at the New York City Marathon in 2002. Along with a 2:36:38 at the Los Angeles Marathon, that brought her to number 4 on the US rankings that year. She also holds the course record at the 3M Half Marathon. 2003 New York Marathon 2:33.10 First American 10th, 3M Half Marathon 2004 P.R. 1:09.51 First overall

== Cross country ==
She was on the US squad for the 1992 IAAF World Cross Country Championships, finishing 42nd in the "Long Race" and taking a team silver medal. In 1997 she set the still standing course record on the difficult Twilight's Last Gleaming Cross Country Challenge.

== Masters career ==
In 2006, she joined the all female See Jane Run team, which has won numerous open national championships with a senior group of elite women.

In 2007, she was named head coach of the Los Angeles City College Track and Cross Country teams That same year she was named "W40 Masters Age Division Runner of the Year" following Masters wins at the Cooper River Bridge Run and the Gate River Run and a second place showing at the Peachtree Road Race.

In 2009, she won the Masters Division of the prestigious Carlsbad 5000

According to a USATF press release, in her spare time, she enjoys salsa dancing.

She is of Mexican American descent.

Took time away from running Masters: On June 10, 2016 at the Jim Bush Invite Mosqueda set an American Record 1500m 4:49.91.

== Achievements ==
- All results regarding marathon, unless stated otherwise

Year	Competition	Venue	Position	Notes
Representing the United States
2003	World Championships	Paris, France	—	DNF

- 2003 IAAF World Half Marathon Championships Vilamoura, Portugal October 4 11th overall 1:11.22, First American
- 2001 IAAF World Half Marathon Championships Bristol London 1:14.04 36th overall team 8th overall for men's team,
- 1992 Cross Country World Championships Boston USA Team 2nd Overall Team Silver Medal
