= Michael Granville =

American middle-distance runner

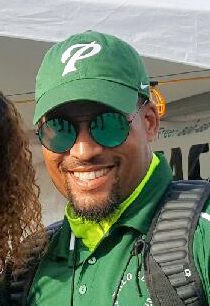
- Granville in 2017

Personal information
- Nationality: United States
- Born: February 14, 1978 (age 48) Bell Gardens, California, U.S.
- Height: 6 ft 1 in (1.85 m)
- Weight: 184 lb (83 kg)

Sport
- Sport: Running
- Event: 800 metres
- College team: UCLA Bruins

Achievements and titles
- Personal bests: *All information from athlete's World Athletics profile unless otherwise noted.: 400 m: 46.15 (San José 1995); 800 m: 1:46.45 (Norwalk 1996); 800 m indoor: 1:51.01 (Indianapolis 1998); 1500 m: 4:06.62 (Westwood 1998)
- Updated on 30 December 2024

Michael Granville (born February 14, 1978) is an American retired 800 meter runner. He held the high school national record in this event from 1996 until 2025, with a time of 1:46.45.

== Early life and background ==
Granville's father was a half miler and observed his son's competitive ability and speed when he played football in 1987. Granville claims to have run 800 meters in a time of 1:56 before entering high school.

== Running career ==
Competing for Bell Gardens High School, Granville set new class records at 800 metres in all four levels of high school; 1:51.03 as a freshman, 1:48.98 as a sophomore, 1:47.96 as a junior, and 1:46.45 as a senior. He also won the Arcadia Invitational four times.

His time of 1:46.45, set in the trial round of the 1996 CIF California State Meet at Cerritos College in Norwalk, California, was a new United States high school record. He went on to win the state meet the following day, but after setting the record he claims he just "dogged it." He had won this race his sophomore season and was upset by Aaron Richburg his junior year.

Granville was trained by his father, on grass at nearby Bell Gardens Middle School, separate from the rest of his team. His father felt training on grass "makes you work harder."

Granville's record qualified him for the United States Olympic Trials. He skipped his high school graduation to compete at the Olympic Trials, where he advanced to the quarter finals behind the previous high school 800 meter record holder George Kersh.

After high school, Granville competed for UCLA where his times did not improve. He won two national championships as a member of the school's 1999 4 × 400 metres relay and distance medley relay teams.

== After retirement ==
Granville coached the Palo Alto High School track and cross country team in Palo Alto, California. He also founded the G:Fit Bootcamp, an outdoor group fitness program.

In 2024, Granville claimed that Cooper Lutkenhaus had the ability to break his 800 meter high school record, which Lutkenhaus achieved in 2025.
