= William J. Rea =

American judge

Senior Judge of the United States District Court for the Central District of California
- In office March 31, 1998 – August 3, 2005

Judge of the United States District Court for the Central District of California
- In office June 15, 1984 – March 31, 1998
- Appointed by: Ronald Reagan
- Preceded by: Malcolm Lucas
- Succeeded by: David O. Carter

Personal details
- Born: William J. Rea; February 21, 1920 Los Angeles, California, U.S.
- Died: August 3, 2005 (aged 85) Santa Monica, California, U.S.
- Education: Loyola Marymount University (B.A.); University of Colorado Law School (LL.B.)

William J. Rea (February 21, 1920 – August 3, 2005) was a United States district judge of the United States District Court for the Central District of California.

== Education and career ==
Born in Los Angeles, California, Rea received a Bachelor of Arts degree from Loyola Marymount University in Los Angeles, in 1942. He served in the United States Navy during World War II, from 1941 to 1946, achieving the rank of lieutenant commander. In 1949, he received a Bachelor of Laws from the University of Colorado Law School. Rea served in private practice, in Los Angeles from 1950 to 1964, then in Santa Ana, California from 1964 to 1968. In 1968, he became a Judge of the Superior Court of Los Angeles County, California, a position he held until 1984.

== Federal judicial service ==
Rea was nominated by President Ronald Reagan on May 24, 1984, to a seat on the United States District Court for the Central District of California vacated by Judge Malcolm M. Lucas. He was confirmed by the United States Senate on June 15, 1984, and received his commission the same day. On March 31, 1998, he assumed senior status. Rea served in that capacity until his death, in Santa Monica, California, on August 3, 2005.

== Sources ==
Legal offices
Preceded by Malcolm M. Lucas	Judge of the United States District Court for the Central District of California; 1984–1998	Succeeded by David O. Carter
