= Don Bandy =

American football player (born 1945)

No. 61
- Position: Guard

Personal information
- Born: July 1, 1945 (age 81); South Gate, California, U.S.
- Listed height: 6 ft 3 in (1.91 m)
- Listed weight: 255 lb (116 kg)

Career information
- High school: Lynwood (Lynwood, California)
- College: Tulsa (1965-1966)
- NFL draft: 1967: 6th round, 135th overall pick

Career history
- Washington Redskins (1967–1968)

Career NFL statistics
- Games played: 26
- Games started: 1
- Stats at Pro Football Reference

Donald Stewart Bandy (born July 1, 1945) is an American former professional football player who was an offensive lineman for the Washington Redskins of the National Football League (NFL). He played college football for the Tulsa Golden Hurricanes.

== Early life ==
Bandy was born in South Gate, California and played prep football at Lynwood High School in Lynwood, California. He played college football at Compton Community College and the University of Tulsa.

== Professional career ==
Bandy was selected 135th overall by the Washington Redskins in the sixth round of the 1967 NFL/AFL draft. He played in the 1967 NFL season and the 1968 NFL season.

== Life after the NFL ==
After leaving the NFL, Bandy served as head coach for Yucca Valley High School in Yucca Valley, California. He is the offensive line coach for Taft College in Taft, California, and teaches history and geography at Taft.
