= George Kersh =

American runner and running coach

Personal information
- Born: July 3, 1968 (age 58) Pearl, Mississippi, U.S.
Medal record
Men's Athletics
Representing the United States
Goodwill Games
Gold medal – first place	1990 Seattle	800m

George Kersh (born July 3, 1968) is an American former world-class runner and current high school running coach.

== High school ==
While running for Pearl High School, Kersh broke the national high school record twice in the 800m, with a best time of 1:46:58 on June 13, 1987. The record was broken in 1996 by Michael Granville of California. George Kersh Drive in Pearl is named after their local hero.

== Collegiate ==
After high school, Kersh went to California to attend Taft Junior College. He still holds the national Junior College record at 800 metres 1:46.60 set at the Mt. SAC Relays in 1989. He went to the University of Mississippi for his final two years of college.

== Post Collegiate ==
Between 1987 and 1994, Kersh ranked in the top 10 at 800m seven times ranking as high as number 2, with a personal best of 1:44:00 at the Olympics Trials in New Orleans on June 24, 1992. He did not qualify for the Olympic team. He came in fourth in the Olympic Trials twice, in 1988 and then in 1992, when he finished .03 of a second out of qualifying behind Johnny Gray (1:42.80), Mark Everett (1:43.67), and José Parrilla (1:43.97). After college, he ran as a member of the Santa Monica Track Club.

He won a gold medal at the 1990 Goodwill Games ahead of Everett and Gray, setting the Goodwill Games record in the process.

== Coaching ==
Today, Kersh coaches Cross Country and Track & Field at his alma mater, Pearl High School.
