= David O. Carter =

American judge (born 1944)

David Carter

Judge of the United States District Court for the Central District of California
- Incumbent
- Assumed office October 22, 1998
- Appointed by: Bill Clinton
- Preceded by: William J. Rea

Personal details
- Born: David Ormon Carter; March 28, 1944 (age 82) Providence, Rhode Island, U.S.
- Spouse: Mary Cohee
- Education: University of California, Los Angeles (BA, JD)

Military service
- Allegiance: United States
- Branch/service: United States Marine Corps
- Years of service: 1967–1969
- Rank: First Lieutenant
- Battles/wars: Vietnam War
- Awards: Bronze Star; Purple Heart

David Ormon Carter (born March 28, 1944) is a United States district judge of the United States District Court for the Central District of California.

== Education and military service ==
In college he lettered in cross country and track on the teams of Jim Bush. Carter received his Bachelor of Arts degree cum laude in 1967 and his Juris Doctor in 1972 from the University of California, Los Angeles and UCLA School of Law, respectively. After graduating from college, Carter accepted a commission in the United States Marine Corps. He served in the Vietnam War where he fought in the Battle of Khe Sanh, receiving a Bronze Star for valor in 1968. He was medically discharged as a First Lieutenant after receiving a Purple Heart.

== Early career ==
Carter began his legal career as an Assistant District Attorney with the Orange County District Attorney's Office in 1972 where he became the senior deputy district attorney in charge of the office's homicide division. Carter filed charges and was the initial prosecutor in the case of serial killer William Bonin, also known as "The Freeway Killer," who became the first person executed by lethal injection in California in 1996.

== Judicial career ==
=== Orange County Superior Court ===
External audio
- “Rethinking Ink”, Distillations Podcast Episode 220, Science History Institute

In 1981, Carter joined the bench as a Municipal Court Judge in Orange County, California. One year later, he became an Orange County Superior Judge, a position that he held until joining the federal judiciary in 1998. Carter initiated a variety of programs to assist in the rehabilitation of convicted felons, including a tattoo removal program for gang members, and was active in planning the county's Law Day festivities.

=== United States District Court ===
Carter was nominated by President Bill Clinton on June 25, 1998, to fill a seat vacated by William J. Rea. Carter was confirmed by the United States Senate on October 21, 1998, and received his commission the following day. He now sits in the Southern Division of the Central District of California in Santa Ana, California.

As a jurist, Carter is known for his intellect, courteous judicial demeanor, work ethic, and expertise in complex criminal cases. Although he is assigned to the Central District of California, Carter also regularly sits by designation in the United States District Court for the District of Idaho and on occasion in the United States Court of Appeals for the Ninth Circuit and in the District of Guam.

In addition to his judicial functions, Carter lectured fellow judges at the California Judges College, the Judicial Criminal Law Institute, and the Ninth Circuit Judicial Conference. He also speaks frequently with judges abroad, including engagements in Brazil, Bosnia, China, the Philippines, Central Asia, Pakistan, Afghanistan, and Malawi.

Carter teaches an undergraduate course on international narcotics trade at the University of California, Irvine, where he has received the school's Distinguished Professors Award three times.

== Notable cases ==
=== Gay-Straight Alliance (Colin ex rel. Colin v. Orange Unified School District) ===
In the first ruling of its kind, Carter issued a preliminary injunction in 2000 ordering Orange County public school officials to allow a Gay-Straight Alliance club organized by students to meet on campus. Carter held that the Equal Access Act requires a public high school, which accepts federal funding and establishes a limited open forum for non-curriculum-related student groups, to allow a student group promoting homosexual tolerance to meet on campus.

Plaintiff's attorney explained, "The judge's opinion was resounding. He really regarded this case as important and understood the real-life issues."

The case settled after Carter issued the injunction when the school board agreed to recognize the Gay-Straight Alliance organization. Although the case was politically controversial, Orange County School Board member Linda Davis later admitted at a board meeting on November 18, 2000 that Carter's legal ruling was correct: "We know the law is on their side, but our community members don't want it."

=== Mexican Mafia trials (United States v. Fernandez, et al.) ===
Between 2000 and 2001, Carter presided over the longest criminal trial in the history of the Central District of California. This case involved the prosecution of more than forty alleged members of the Mexican Mafia on charges of murder, attempted murder, conspiracy to murder, extortion, robbery, and various drug trafficking and firearms crimes. Much of the case involved a triple homicide that occurred in 1998.

The case was severed into three trials, with Carter presiding over each, and lasted for a combined 18 months. Following the conviction of Mariano "Chuy" Martinez on murder charges, the prosecution sought the death penalty, making it the first capital case to be tried in Los Angeles federal court since 1950. A jury ultimately spared Martinez, sentencing him instead to life imprisonment.

=== Anna Nicole Smith (In re Marshall) ===
In 2002, Carter awarded over $88 million in damages to former Playboy Playmate Vickie Lynn Marshall, also known as Anna Nicole Smith, in the battle over the estate of her late husband, billionaire J. Howard Marshall. The case came to Carter on appeal following a federal bankruptcy court ruling that awarded Smith $475 million of her late husband's $1.6 billion fortune.

Carter concluded that Howard's son, E. Pierce Marshall, interfered with Smith's attempts to collect her inheritance. "The evidence of willfulness, maliciousness, and fraud is overwhelming," Carter wrote in his 54-page opinion. Upon finding that Smith had a reasonable expectation that she would receive a portion of her husband's estate without interference, Carter held that Smith was entitled to collect $44.3 million in punitive damages and $44.3 million in compensatory damages against Pierce Marshall.

The Ninth Circuit Court of Appeals vacated Carter's order on the grounds that he lacked jurisdiction to hear the case because federal jurisdiction interfered with Texas probate court proceedings. The Supreme Court of the United States reversed the Ninth Circuit, concluding in a unanimous opinion that Carter properly exercised jurisdiction over Smith's claim and remanded the case for further proceedings. However, on remand from the Supreme Court, the Ninth Circuit determined that Carter should have deferred to the earlier decision of the Texas probate court, and directed Carter to enter judgment for Marshall.

=== Aryan Brotherhood trials (United States v. Mills, et al.) ===
Carter has been involved in the proceedings arising from the 2002 indictment on racketeering charges of forty alleged members of the Aryan Brotherhood ("AB"), a notorious prison gang. This indictment alleges that the AB ordered thirty-two murders over a 23-year period and charges forty-one AB gang members and associates with violations of the federal RICO Act. Twenty-six defendants were eligible for the death penalty, making this the largest capital indictment in federal history.

Twenty of the defendants charged in the indictment were assigned to Carter, including two of the three commissioners of the AB's federal faction, Barry "The Baron" Mills and Tyler "The Hulk" Bingham. Following a six-month trial, a jury convicted both Mills and Bingham of committing Violent Crimes in Aid of Racketeering (VICAR) and murder. The jury deadlocked on the death penalty, and both have been sentenced and are now serving life terms at ADX Florence, the federal system's sole supermax facility.

The trials of several remaining defendants are currently ongoing before Carter and other judges in the Central District of California.

=== MGA Entertainment v. Mattel ===
Carter presided over a $500 million lawsuit between MGA Entertainment and Mattel over the origins and ownership of the Bratz line of fashion dolls. Ultimately, Mattel was ordered to pay $137 million in attorney's fees and costs.

=== Barnett v. Obama ===
In 2009, Carter dismissed a lawsuit, Barnett v. Obama, challenging President Barack Obama's election and assumption of office because of claims that Obama was not a natural born citizen of the United States, commenting that the power to remove a sitting president from office resides with Congress, not the judiciary.

=== United States v. McGraw-Hill ===
Carter presided over a civil action brought by the U.S. Department of Justice against Standard & Poor's. The $5 billion lawsuit claimed that S&P engaged in fraud when it gave high ratings to mortgage-backed securities and collateralized debt obligations before the 2008 financial crisis. Carter denied a motion to dismiss, noting that S&P's argument that those ratings were mere puffery was "deeply and unavoidably troubling when you take a moment to consider its implications." S&P claimed that this action is retaliation for its 2011 downgrade of United States debt. In 2015, S&P settled with the DoJ for $1.375 billion.

=== Cases involving the homeless ===
In 2018, Judge Carter was the judge presiding in a case involving clearing homeless people from the Santa Ana River Trail in Orange County, California. Known for his unconventional approach, he helped broker a deal between the residents of the river trail and the county, whereby many of the residents were placed in motels for a month.

In 2019, Carter was removed from presiding over a case involving homeless plaintiffs challenging anti-camping ordinances in five South Orange County cities due to concerns about his bias. His statements and actions in the Santa Ana River Trail case were cited in the order removing him from the case: "The Court finds that in view of the combination of circumstances, a reasonable observer would conclude based on appearances that the District Judge [Carter] is not unbiased."

In 2021, he was the judge in a case involving removing homeless people from Echo Park, Los Angeles. On April 21, 2021, Carter ruled in a 110-page opinion brief that homeless people on Skid Row, in Los Angeles, must be offered housing by October 18. Both the city and county of Los Angeles appealed, and Carter's ruling was overturned on September 23, 2021, by a unanimous vote of the 9th Circuit Court of Appeals.

=== Eastman v. Thompson ===
In 2022, Judge Carter ordered John Eastman to turn over certain documents to the United States House Select Committee on the January 6 Attack. In his order, the judge said "the Court finds it more likely than not that President Trump corruptly attempted to obstruct the Joint Session of Congress on January 6, 2021." In the civil suit, Eastman had claimed attorney-client privilege, but Carter rejected the claim because attorney-client privilege does not apply if the discussion involved a crime, and "the illegality of the plan was obvious." In that opinion Carter coined the term “this was a coup in search of a legal theory.”

=== United States v. Shirley Weber (voter data) ===
On January 15, 2026, Carter ruled that the federal government could not force California to hand over sensitive voter information, such as voters' names, addresses, birthdates, drivers license and Social Security numbers. Carter wrote: “The centralization of this information by the federal government would have a chilling effect on voter registration which would inevitably lead to decreasing voter turnout as voters fear that their information is being used for some inappropriate or unlawful purpose. This risk threatens the right to vote which is the cornerstone of American democracy.”

Legal offices
Preceded by William J. Rea	Judge of the United States District Court for the Central District of California; 1998–present	Incumbent
