= Sammie Burroughs =

American football player (born 1973)

No. 53
- Position: Linebacker

Personal information
- Born: June 21, 1973 (age 53); Pomona, California, U.S.
- Listed height: 6 ft 0 in (1.83 m)
- Listed weight: 227 lb (103 kg)

Career information
- High school: Pomona
- College: Portland State
- NFL draft: 1996: undrafted

Career history
- Indianapolis Colts (1996–1998); Miami Dolphins (1999)

Career NFL statistics
- Tackles: 71
- Sacks: 1
- Forced fumbles: 2
- Stats at Pro Football Reference

Sammie Lee Burroughs (born June 21, 1973) is an American former professional football player who was a linebacker for two seasons with the Indianapolis Colts of the National Football League (NFL). He played college football at Itawamba Community College and Mt. San Antonio College before transferring to the Portland State Vikings. He was also a member of the Miami Dolphins.

== Early life and college ==
Sammie Lee Burroughs was born on June 21, 1973, in Pomona, California. He attended Pomona High School in Pomoma.

Burroughs first played college football at Itawamba Community College and then Mt. San Antonio College. He transferred to play for the Portland State Vikings of Portland State University, where he earned Little All-American honors.

== Professional career ==
Burroughs signed with the Indianapolis Colts after going undrafted in the 1996 NFL draft. He had been projected as a safety in the NFL but ended up playing linebacker. He played in all 16 games, starting one, for the Colts during his rookie year in 1996, recording 32 solo tackles, 10 assisted tackles, and two forced fumbles. Burroughs also appeared in one playoff game that year. He played in all 16 games, starting one, for the second straight season in 1997, posting 20 solo tackles, nine assisted tackles, and one sack. He was placed on injured reserve in August 1998 and missed the entire season.

Burroughs became a free agent after the 1998 season and signed a one-year contract with the Miami Dolphins in March 1999. He was placed on the physically unable to perform list on August 31, 1999, with a back injury and missed the entire season. He became a free agent after the 1999 season.

== Personal life ==
Burroughs' son, Sammie Burroughs III, played college football at East Mississippi Community College.
