= Twilight's Last Gleaming Cross Country Challenge =

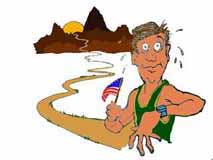
- Logo of Twilight's Last Gleaming Cross Country Challenge
- Date: Last Saturday in October
- Location: Ventura, California
- Event type: Cross Country
- Distance: 4 Miles
- Established: 1986
- Course records: 23:04.19 (M; 2013, Jacques Sallberg); 26:28.75 (F; 1997, Sylvia Mosqueda)
- Website: www.trackinfo.org/twilight.html

Twilight's Last Gleaming Cross Country Challenge is a four-mile, annual cross country style running race. It is held on the same course, in and around Arroyo Verde Park, annually on the last Saturday in October, starting at 5 p.m. The race was the last race of the Southern California USATF Cross Country Grand Prix series before the final. The 2015 event will be on October 24.

The race was started in 1986 by television director and eccentric track and field enthusiast Andrew Hecker. He devised this event on encouragement from another local, eccentric race director Brian Pritchard, who at the time the Long Distance Running Chairman for Southern California TAC (The Athletics Congress), the predecessor of the modern day USATF. Seeing Hecker's enthusiasm for helping at local events he asked, "So Andrew, when are you going to put on a race?" This race became the answer.

The original intent with the name and schedule of the race was to coincide with the last day of Daylight saving time. When the U.S. Government decided to change the weekend of the time change, it was decided to keep the race on the same, final Saturday in October, schedule. When there is a large wildfire in the Ventura County area, the park where the race is held has been procured as a secluded housing area for the firefighters, canceling all other events in the park. There have been a few occasions over the years when the race has had to be rescheduled into the month of November. The weather on those occasions has been less pleasant, though the race is announced as "Rain or Shine."

Arroyo Verde Park, off Foothill Road at the end of Day Road, is one of the most distinctive parks in the Ventura, California Park System. It is nestled in a canyon of oak-thickets, with steep hills covered by chaparral on both sides. The steep hills are part of the distinctive and challenging course, which boasts over 1200 feet of elevation gain (and loss) over its four miles. The hills are notable. The first is the Skyline hill, a residential city street adjacent to the park, rising almost 400 feet in just over half a mile. The next one is referred to as "The Finger," as in the obscene gesture, which ultimately winds down to the base of the steepest hill on the course, called "The Wall" which achieves almost a 20 percent grade. The 2 mile, halfway point is on "The Wall." After reaching the peak of that hill, the next mile generally winds down through sandy trails (with hidden boulders under the sand) to the floor of the canyon, where it passes through sections of pavement, wood chips, grass and more dirt trails. The final mile is perhaps the easiest part of the course, but after the previous three miles, even the gentle climb on the park's lower trail is a challenge. Just for insult, the final 50 yards is a steep climb up a grass hill.Course map

See the satellite view of the course area.

If the course is not different enough, the (dis-)organization of the race deliberately tries to do things differently. The race is held in the evening, rather than the morning. The 4 p.m. start time allows for even the slowest competitors to find their way back to the finish before sunset. The age division are uniquely broken into 6 year age groups, with records carefully kept based on these age groups since the race started. And while the entry fees are kept to a minimum, race management deliberately requests all entrants use day of race registration. A $5 penalty for EARLY registration is charged . . . nobody has ever been interested in paying for such a privilege. While many running races make T-shirt sales an important part of their marketing, flyers for this race advertise T-shirts are available for $30, which somehow has had a severely detrimental effect on their sales. The awards have traditionally been personalized mugs and commemorative tiles with the race logo. The tiles have become so treasured, perhaps a badge of honor, that some competitors have put them on display by installing them in their kitchen or bathroom wall.
