= Taft College =

Public community college in Taft, California, US

- Type: Public community college
- Established: August 30, 1922
- Parent institution: West Kern Community College District and California Community Colleges system
- Superintendent/President and CEO: Dr. Rafe Edward Trickey, Jr.
- Faculty: 58 full-time 59 part-time
- Administrative staff: 31
- Students: 5,723
- Location: Taft, California, United States; 35°08′58″N 119°27′36″W
- Campus: Suburban
- Colors: Black and Gold
- Nickname: Cougars
- Website: www.taftcollege.edu

Taft College is a public community college in Taft, California. It is a part of the California Community Colleges system and is accredited by the Accrediting Commission for Community and Junior Colleges. The college is one of only a few community colleges in California to have on-campus housing.

The college was founded in 1922 as Taft Junior College. Initially, it was part of the Taft Union High School District with classes held on the campus of Taft Union High School. The college switched to its current name in 1954 and opened its own separate campus adjacent to the high school in 1956.

Taft College offers Associate in Arts and Associate in Science degrees as well as a variety of certificates. Graduates who complete specified programs are prepared for transfer to the California State University or University of California systems.

== History ==
The history of Taft Junior College begins with the close of last year. One day Mr. MacReynolds inquired how many of those who were graduating [from TUHS] would attend such an institution if it were established. The response was rather meager but when school opened we numbered about a dozen.

— Randolph Matson, introduction to The Derrick, Taft College yearbook, 1923

In 1910 Taft had a population of 1,650, but within eight years that number swelled to 4,000. New schools were built at all levels to keep up with population growth. Taft Union High School (TUHS) District was formed in July 1920, with the expectation that a junior college would shortly follow. On August 30, 1922, the TUHS Board voted to create Taft Junior College, with the first classes being held on the grounds of the high school.

During the Second World War Taft hosted a training school for the United States Army Air Corps at Gardner Field. In October 1947 TUHS purchased leftover buildings from the defunct Gardner and Minter Fields. The junior college moved into these remodeled structures on August 27, 1948.

By 1954 the population of Taft had reached 16,100 and Taft Junior College clearly required its own campus. On July 1 preliminary plans for the new campus were approved and the institution officially changed its name to Taft College. Construction began in May 1955 and the new campus opened its doors on September 11, 1956.

In 1962 voters created a new college district and the college separated completely from TUHS. In October 1964 construction began on the first dormitories and students took up residence the following year. The Science Building opened in 1966, the Technical Arts Building in 1967, the Vocational Ed Building in 1969 and the library annex in 1970. A new gymnasium was added in 1981.

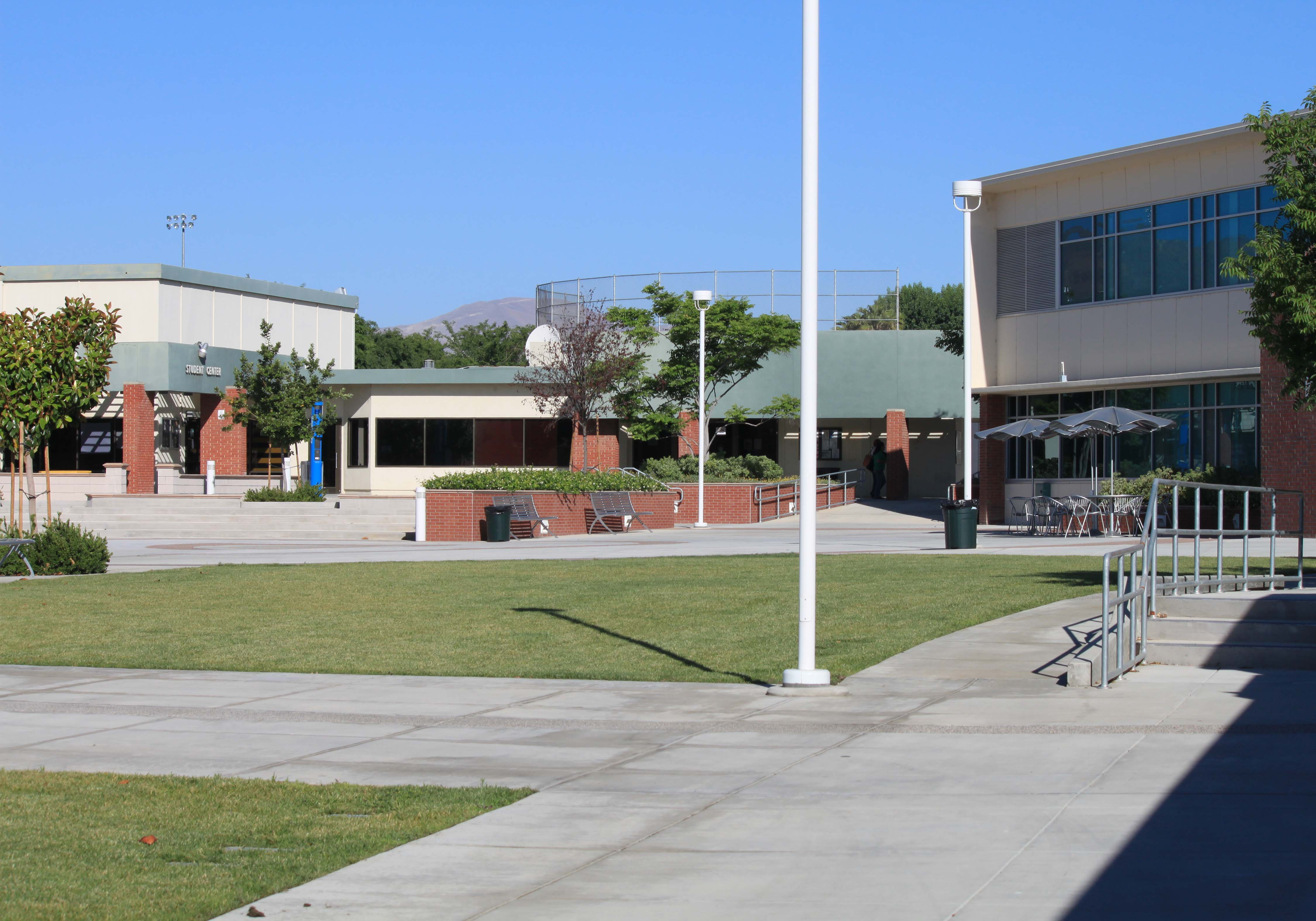
The central quad in 2012. The Student Center building contains the cafeteria and testing center, with the baseball field in the background. At right is the administration/library building.

Throughout the 1980s and into the 1990s Taft College featured highly in sports, particularly in football. In 1994 the college was forced to eliminate all athletic programs due to budget cuts. Some programs (but not football) were later restored.

In March 2004 voters approved a $39.8 million bond to finance renovation of existing college facilities and expand into new structures.

== Academics ==
Taft College focuses on preparing students for career advancement in their current field or for further study at four-year institutions. The college's mission emphasizes basic skills and service to students. A variety of associate degrees are available in Arts and Sciences, together with certificates in specific subject areas.

Since 1993 the college has offered degrees in dental hygiene, and the Dental Hygiene Clinic is open to the public. Taft College also runs the Transition to Independent Living (TIL) Program, which trains young adults with developmental disabilities in the responsibilities of living on their own. "The Children's Center is the largest single-site child care facility in the California Community College system."

== Student life ==
In fall 2011 Taft College enrolled just over 5,000 students, of whom 29% were first-time attendees. The student population was 62% male. Forty-eight percent were age 24 or younger. Hispanics represented 49% of the student body and white non-Hispanics 39%, with no other race exceeding 5%. In Fall 2011 98.5% of students came from high schools within California, overwhelmingly from Kern County. (Note: This report excludes large subpopulations within the student body, notably students in the Taft Correctional Facility or the WESTEC facility. It also excludes high schools that sent fewer than 5 students to Taft College. Nevertheless, the percentages are probably broadly accurate for the student body as a whole.)

The vast majority of students commute to school, but about 200 live on-campus in two residence halls.

The Associated Student Body is the "official governing organization of students enrolled at Taft College." Students participate in a variety of clubs. The college sponsors a student literary magazine, A Sharp Piece of Awesome, and a newspaper, Black Gold. There are two honor societies, Phi Theta Kappa and the National Society of Leadership and Success.

== Governance ==
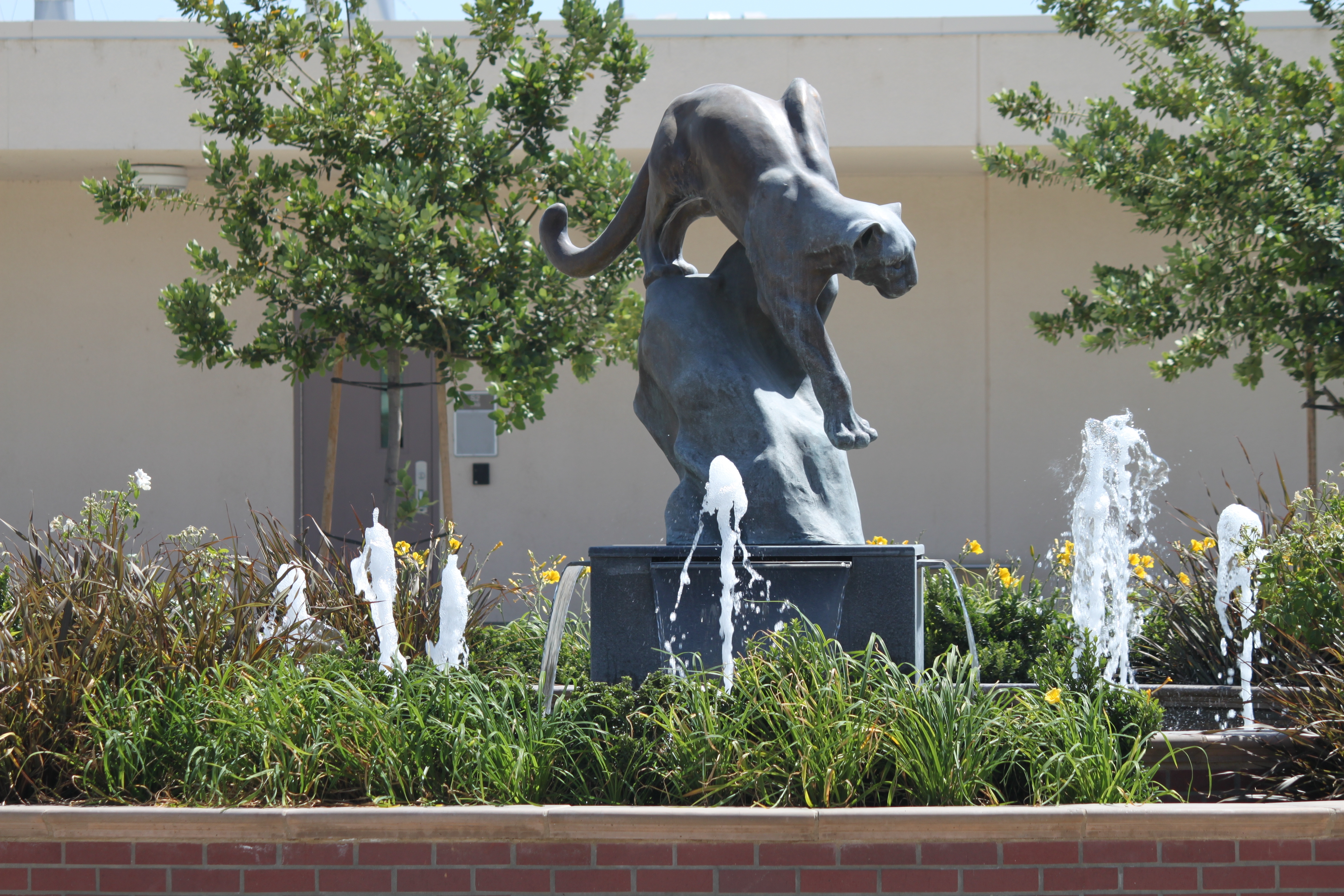
The Cougar is the official mascot of Taft College. The science building is in the background.

Taft College is the sole college within the West Kern Community College District (WKCCD).

The WKCCD is overseen by a five-member board of trustees who are responsible for maintaining high standards in college operations, selecting a Superintendent/President, outlining district policy, and assuring the district's financial stability. Board members are elected by the voters in the WKCCD for a four-year term, staggered so that half the board is up for election in each even-numbered year.

Faculty members are represented by the Faculty Association. Other employees are represented by the California School Employees Association (CSEA). Students are represented by the Associated Student Body.

== Notable staff and alumni ==
- Scott Baker, Major League Baseball player
- Don Bandy, football player for the Washington Redskins and professor at Taft College for 33 years
- Miguel Ibarra, soccer player for Minnesota United FC and USMNT
- George Kersh, world class 800 meters runner, Goodwill Games champion and national Community College record holder
- Homer Baird Kidwell, class of 1930, justice of the State Supreme Court of Hawaii
- Mike Perez, former NFL player
- Jason Phillips, former NFL player
- Brandon Rock, Olympic 800 meters runner.
- Tracy Rogers, former NFL player
- Dante Scarnecchia, former NFL assistant coach

== See also ==
- Taft Union High School
- Taft City School District - Elementary and junior high schools
