= Arroyo Verde Park =

Park in Ventura, California

- Location within southern California
- Interactive map of Arroyo Verde Park
- Location: Ventura, California
- Coordinates: 34°17′15″N 119°13′34″W
- Area: 134 acres (54 ha)
- Created: 1961
- Open: From 7:00 A.M. to 6:00 P.M.

Arroyo Verde Park is a park located in a dried-up river valley in Ventura, California. The entry gate is located at the intersection between Ventura's Foothill and Day Roads. The park is 132 acres in area., The park is open from 7:00 A.M. to 6:00 P.M. Arroyo Verde Park is a popular spot for barbecues and children's birthday parties, particularly in the summer. Several hiking trails run near and outside the park, including a notoriously steep path known as "The Wall". However, the most notable trail in the park is the 3.5-mile-long Arroyo Verde Park Trail.
During the Thomas Fire of 2017–2018, multiple structures, including the park's nature center and a playground were destroyed. A new playground, dubbed the "inclusive play area", was later built.

== Nature center ==
Before it was destroyed, the nature center held a collection of taxidermy animals such as foxes.

The park has hosted Twilight's Last Gleaming Cross Country Challenge annually since 1986.
