= Kemarley Brown =

Bahraini track and field sprinter (born 1992)

Personal information
- Born: July 20, 1992 (age 33)
- Height: 1.82 m (5 ft 11 1/2 in)
- Weight: 85 kg (187 lb)

Sport
- Country: Bahrain
- Sport: Athletics
- Event: 100 metres

Ashani Kemarley Brown (born 20 July 1992) is a Bahraini track and field sprinter who competes in the 100 metres and 200 metres. His personal best for the 100 m is 9.93 seconds.

== Career ==
Brown competed for his birth country, Jamaica until 2015, when he switched to Bahrain.

== 2011 ==
He won his first international medal with the Jamaican 4 × 100 metres relay team at the 2011 CARIFTA Games, where he, Odail Todd, Kemar Bailey-Cole and Jazeel Murphy topped the podium in the junior section. He endured injuries after this, which interrupted his development.

== 2014 ==
He moved to the United States to receive an education and began attending Merritt College in Oakland, California in 2012. While there, he improved his strength and endurance and twice won the California Community College title in the 100 m for Merritt College. He won his second title in 2014 at the CCCAA State Track and Field Championships by breaking the 10-second barrier with a personal best time of 9.93 seconds – the fastest ever 100 m by a junior college athlete. This mark ranked him fifth in the world for that season, with Asafa Powell being the only Jamaican faster than Brown. That same year (2014), he achieved a best of 20.38 seconds for the 200 m, which placed him in the top fifty of that event that season.

== 2015 ==
Kemarley won his heat of the UTECH Classic Athletics in Kingston, Jamaica on April 11, 2015. He did not finish Jamaica International Invitational in Kingston (NS), JAM, 09/05/2015. In July 2015, he asked for transfer of allegiance to represent Bahrain.

== 2016 ==
Brown represented Bahrain at the 2016 Summer Olympics held in Rio de Janeiro, Brazil. In the 100m he qualified for the semi-finals with a time of 10.13 seconds.

== Personal bests ==
- 100 metres – 9.93 seconds (2014)
- 200 metres – 20.38 seconds (2014)

== International competitions ==
| Year | Competition | Venue | Position | Event | Notes |
Representing Jamaica
| 2011 | CARIFTA Games (U20) | Montego Bay, Jamaica | 1st | 4 × 100 m relay | 39.75 |
| 2015 | Universiade | Gwangju, South Korea | 2nd | 100 m | 10.12 |
Representing Bahrain
| 2016 | Olympic Games | Rio de Janeiro, Brazil | 18th (sf) | 100 m | 10.13 |
