= Mt. San Antonio College =

Community college in Walnut, California, US

- Type: Public community college
- Established: 1946
- President: Martha Garcia
- Students: 29,971 (fall 2024)
- Location: Walnut, California, US; 34.047°N 117.845°W
- Campus: suburban, 420 acres (1.7 km^{2})
- Colors: Maroon
- Nickname: Mounties
- Mascot: Rizzly the Grizzly
- Website: www.mtsac.edu

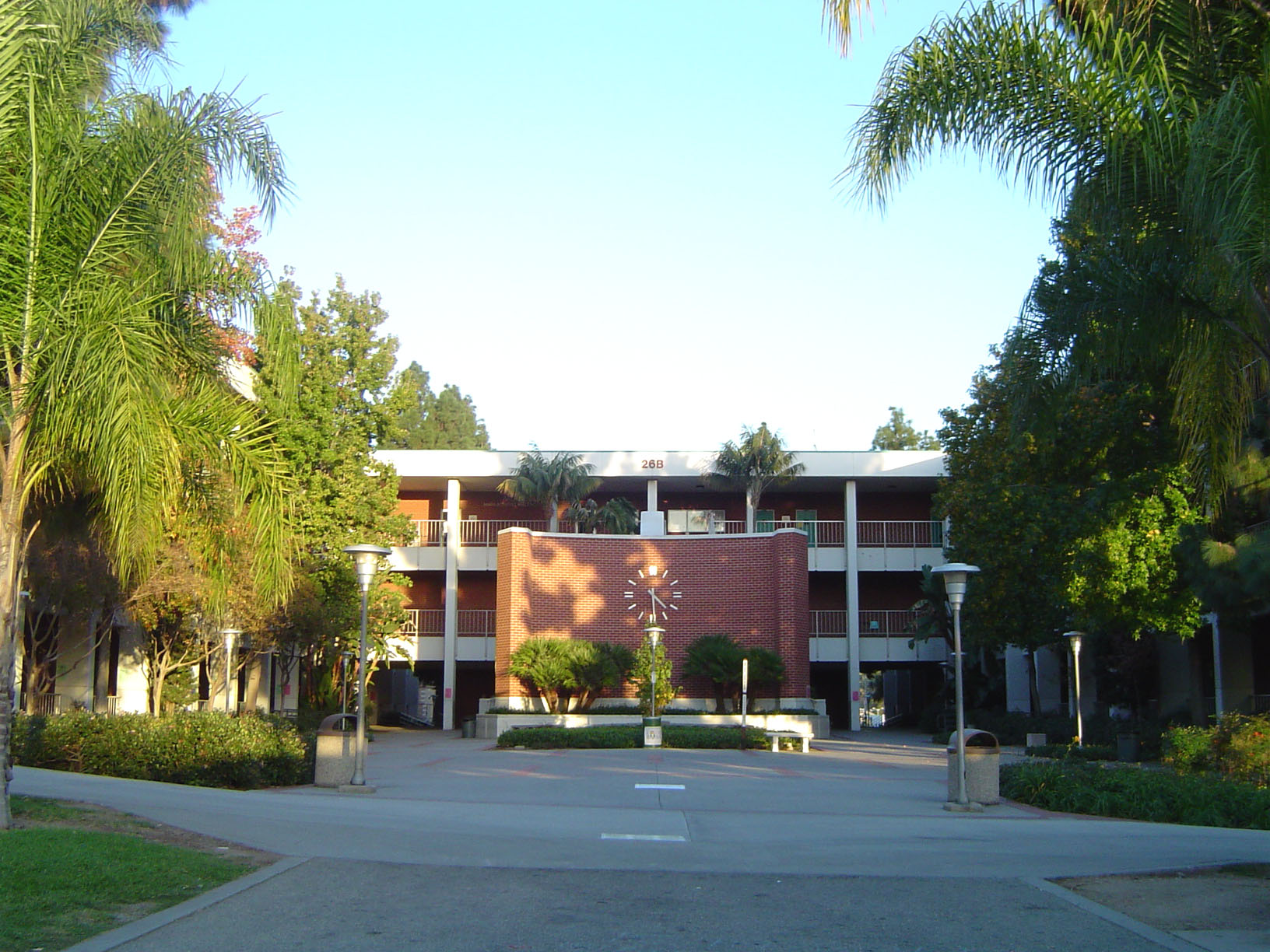
The Humanities & Social Sciences Complex

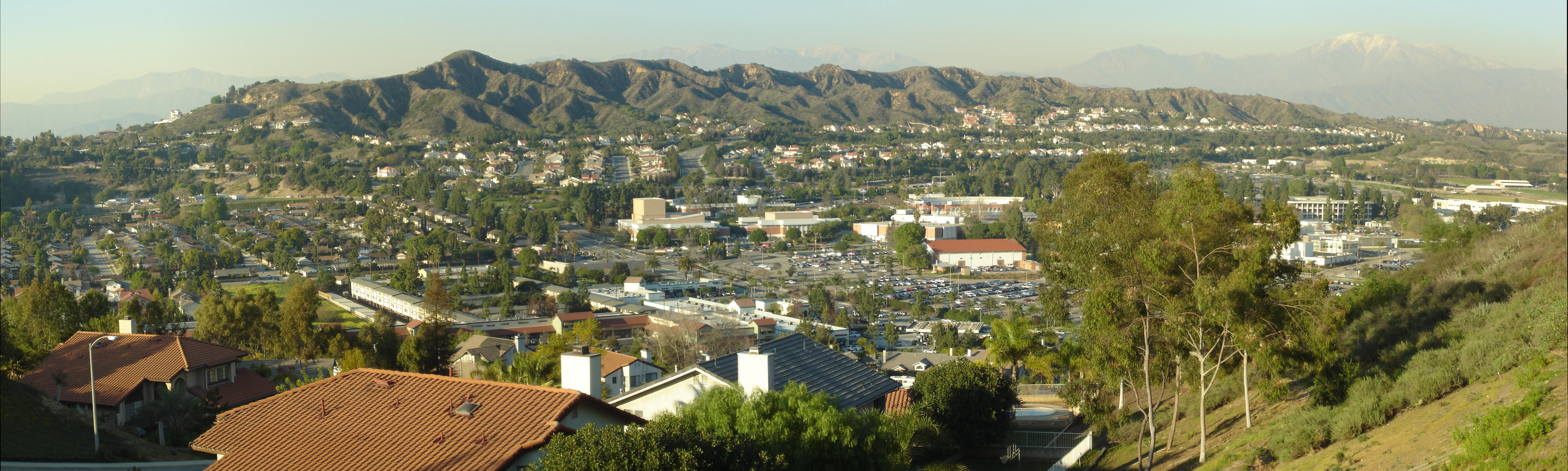
Panorama of campus

Mt. San Antonio College (Mt. SAC) is a public community college in Walnut, California. It offers more than 400 degree and certificate programs, 36 support programs, and more than 50 student clubs and athletic programs, including food pantry, counseling, and tutoring. The college offers associate degrees, career education, community recreation courses, ESL, adult education, and youth summer programs.

== History ==
After World War II, local leaders anticipated the return of young people to college. Four local high school districts voted to approve the formation of the Mt. San Antonio Community College District in December 1945. The board wasted little time. They immediately began to meet on December 26, 1945, and set out to find a suitable location and hire staff. They leased from the state of California a former U.S. Naval hospital located on 445 acres in what was unincorporated Walnut. The land had buildings from as early as 1919, when it was a home for wayward boys. It had also been the State Narcotic Hospital before the war.

The lease began on July 1, 1946, and a newly hired staff immediately set out to open a college and begin to offer classes that fall. With a meager budget of $191,790, faculty and staff worked relentlessly to gather furniture and supplies, design courses, and register students. Family members and students voluntarily pitched in to help collect supplies and paint walls. The school opened for classes on September 16, 1946, with 682 registered students taking classes in programs organized under 7 divisions and 12 departments.

== Campus ==
Sitting on 420 acres in Walnut, California, Mt. San Antonio College is strategically located in the center of the district it serves. While the college accepts students from outside of the district and even internationally, its district focuses on serving communities on the eastern edge of Los Angeles County, including Baldwin Park, Bassett, Charter Oak, Covina, Diamond Bar, the southern portion of Glendora, Hacienda Heights, City of Industry, Irwindale, La Puente, La Verne, Pomona, Rowland Heights, San Dimas, Valinda, Walnut, and West Covina.

The college has invested more than $1.5 billion in updating its facilities through public support of Measure R, Measure RR, and Measure GO bonds. The college has a 250-acre farm; a working veterinary hospital; student-run restaurant, new science classrooms and laboratory facilities; a music, dance, and theater building; multi-media/internet connected classrooms; a new Olympic-quality stadium and athletics complex, baseball complex; two soccer fields; and is home of the world-famous Mt. SAC Relays. It has an Olympic size swimming pool, tennis courts, and a working farm which includes horses, cattle, sheep, swine, and a canine facility that works with a greyhound rescue group to rehabilitate retired racing dogs each semester. The school also has a 15-acre (6.1 ha) Wildlife Sanctuary that supports a large variety of native species of birds, mammals, and insects. It consists of a lake, swamp, stream, pond, meadow, and forested area. It is one of the last "safe" places for nature to exist in Walnut due to increased development and a growing population.

The Randall Planetarium has been open since 1968. There are more projects in progress, the latest being a modern agricultural sciences complex, including a working animal hospital, set to complete construction in spring 2011. Construction has also begun on a new Design Technology building. More projects are also expected in the next few years as funds from a recently voter approved measure come in. Located on campus are several campus cafes and a "Common Grounds" area.

== Academics ==
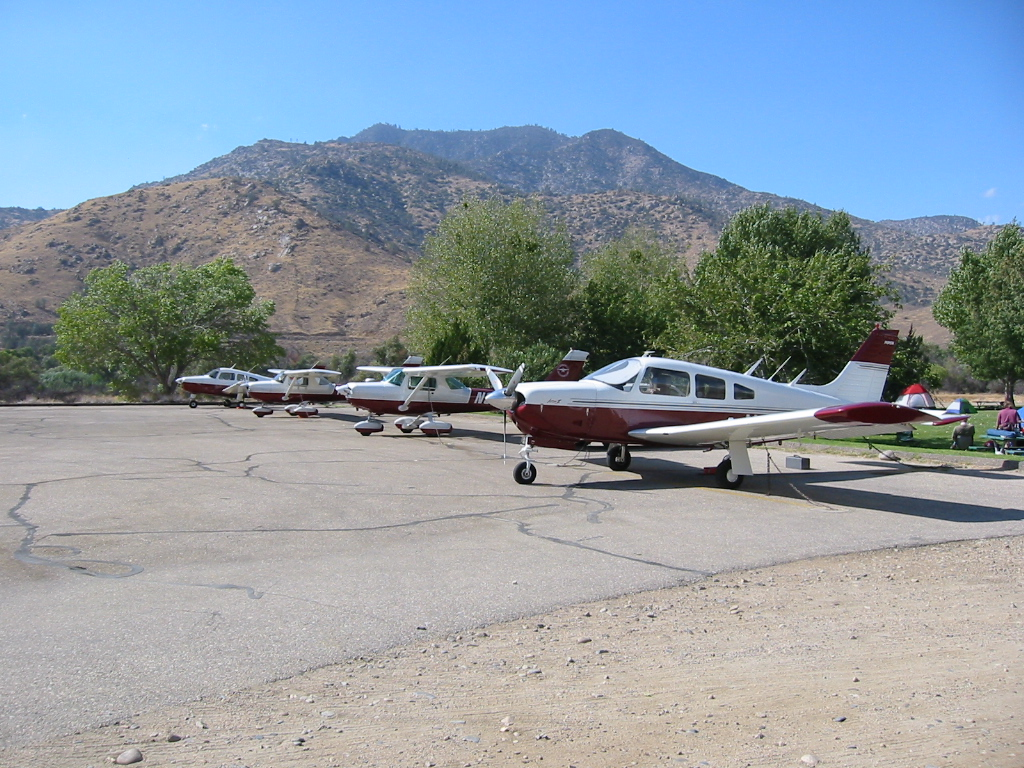
Mt SAC Flying Team, fall training 2002

Mt. SAC has nearly 400 programs available that provide associate degrees as well as certificates.

It has an aviation and aircraft maintenance program. Through this program, Mt SAC offers Associate of Science degrees in Aviation Science (their air traffic control program), Commercial Flight, and Unmanned Aircraft Systems. The school has partnerships with four-year schools to which students can arrange to receive a bachelor's degree. For example, the Mt SAC aviation program has an on-campus partnership with Southern Illinois University to offer a Bachelor of Science degree in Aviation Management. Mt. SAC is one of 36 colleges in the United States to offer the College Training Initiative (CTI) program through the FAA, under their Aviation Science major. This program attracts students from across the United States. It trains students to be air traffic controllers for the FAA.

Besides air traffic control, Mt. SAC has the largest Associate of Science, Commercial Flight degree program in California. It maintains a flight training association on and off campus at nearby Brackett Airport, with a hangar and facilities made possible through donations from Sophia Clarke (renowned for also providing generous gifts for the modern and stately, state-of-the-art Sophia B. Clarke theater and its adjacent equally photogenic edifices). Its flying team is ranked as the best among community colleges in the western United States from 1991 to 2006. In 2000, 2002, 2005, and 2013, the flying team ranked No. 1 among community colleges in the United States. Also in 2005, and in 1987, the school was the recipient of the Loening Trophy, recognizing the school as having the nation's Best Aviation Program. The Mt SAC Flying team is a member of National Intercollegiate Flying Association and Pacific Coast Intercollegiate Flying Association.

== Student life ==
Fall Demographics of student body
Ethnic Breakdown	2021	2017
Hispanic and Latino American	68%	63%
Black	2.4%	4%
Asian American	14.5%	17%
Native Hawaiian or other Pacific Islander	4%	0%
White	6%	10%
Multiracial Americans	3%	3%
International students	2%	2%
Unknown	0%	0%
Female	55%	52%
Male	42%	48%

Associated Students is the student government organization at Mt. San Antonio College and serves as the official voice of the student body. Its budget of more than $600,000 is generated by an optional "Student Activities" fee paid by students during the fall and spring semesters. Associated Students coordinates and sponsors several events for the student body. Events and sponsorships include the following: campus holiday celebration, celebrity speakers, women's history month activities, cultural celebrations, commencement rehearsal, awards and recognition ceremonies, weekend college tours, and the transfer achievement celebration. Associated Students officers include members of the executive board, Student Senate, and Student Court.

=== Public speaking ===
Mt. SAC has a national award-winning Speech and Debate (forensics) team. The program has won numerous regional, national and international speech and debate tournaments, including the Phi Rho Pi national community college tournament, the American Forensics Association (AFA) national undergraduate tournament, the International Forensics Association (IFA), as well as many Readers Theater championships. Most recently, the team captured the national title at the 2026 Phi Rho Pi tournament. In 2023, the team won the Sylvia Mariner Perpetual Sweepstakes Award for earning accumulative points – an honor Mt. SAC last won 12 years beforehand in 2011. Coaches John Vitullo (2011) and Danny Cantrell (2021) were awarded the Phi Rho Pi Distinguished Service Award, which is the highest Phi Rho Pi honor awarded to a coach.

=== Chamber singers ===
Mt. SAC's choral music department includes the award-winning Chamber Singers. Notable achievements include "Choir of the World" in 2007 at the famed Llangollen International Musical Eisteddfod in Wales. In addition to their world title, the mixed group also won three gold medals for their performances in the Youth Choir, Mixed Choir, and Folk Song Choir divisions, making them the choir with the most gold medals won at any of the 61 Eisteddfod competitions.

=== Fermata Nowhere ===
Mt. SAC's TTBB a cappella group, Fermata Nowhere, is the only community college a cappella group to win an International Championship of Collegiate A Cappella (ICCA) title. They qualified for ICCA finals in 2004 and 2009, where they placed 2nd and 1st, respectively. In 2020, The A Cappella Archive ranked Fermata Nowhere at No. 15 out of all ICCA-competing ensembles. The group disbanded in 2022 with the retirement of their director William McIntosh, and a new SATB a capella group, Nu Aria, continues in its place.

== Athletics ==
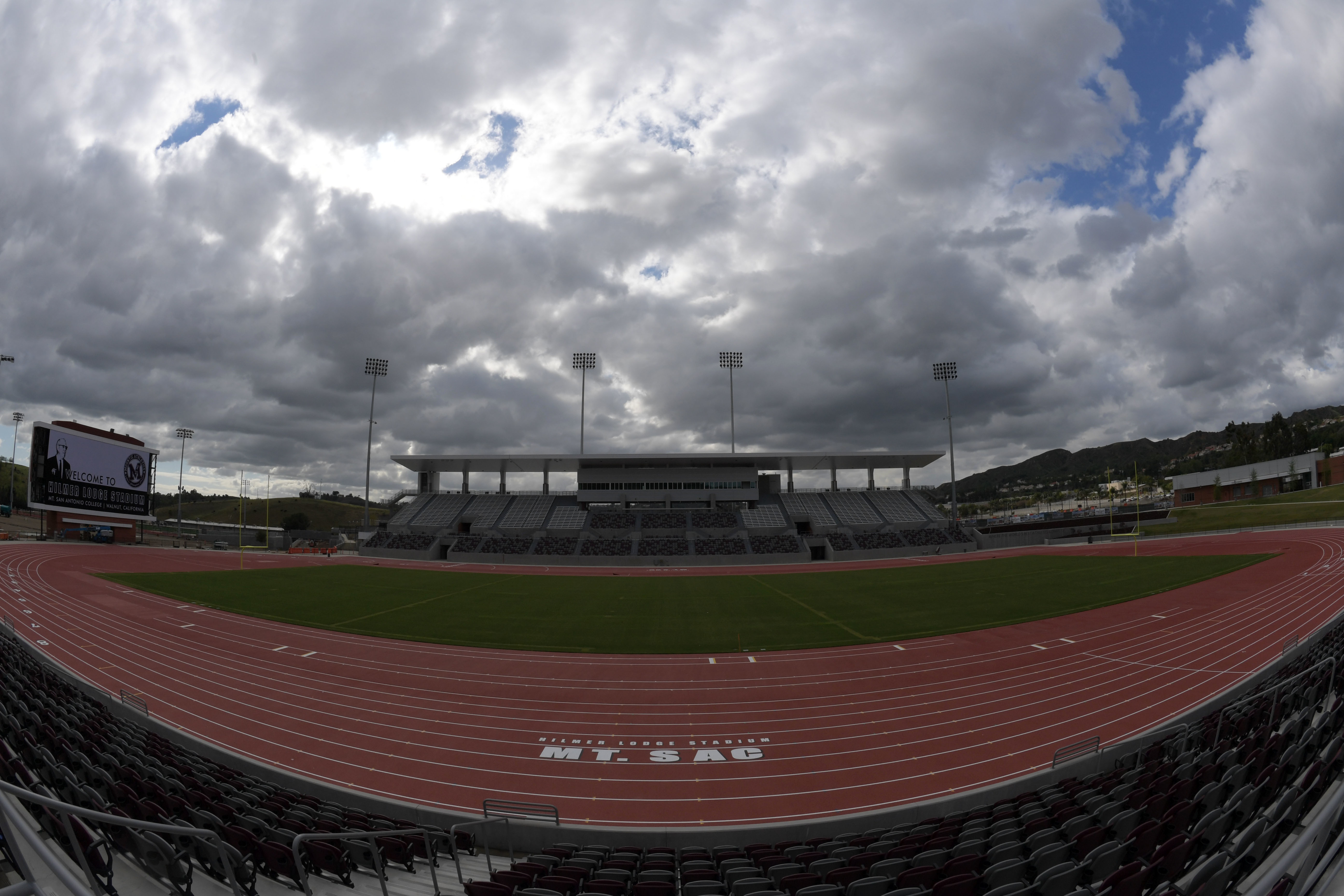
New Hilmer Lodge Stadium (March 2020)

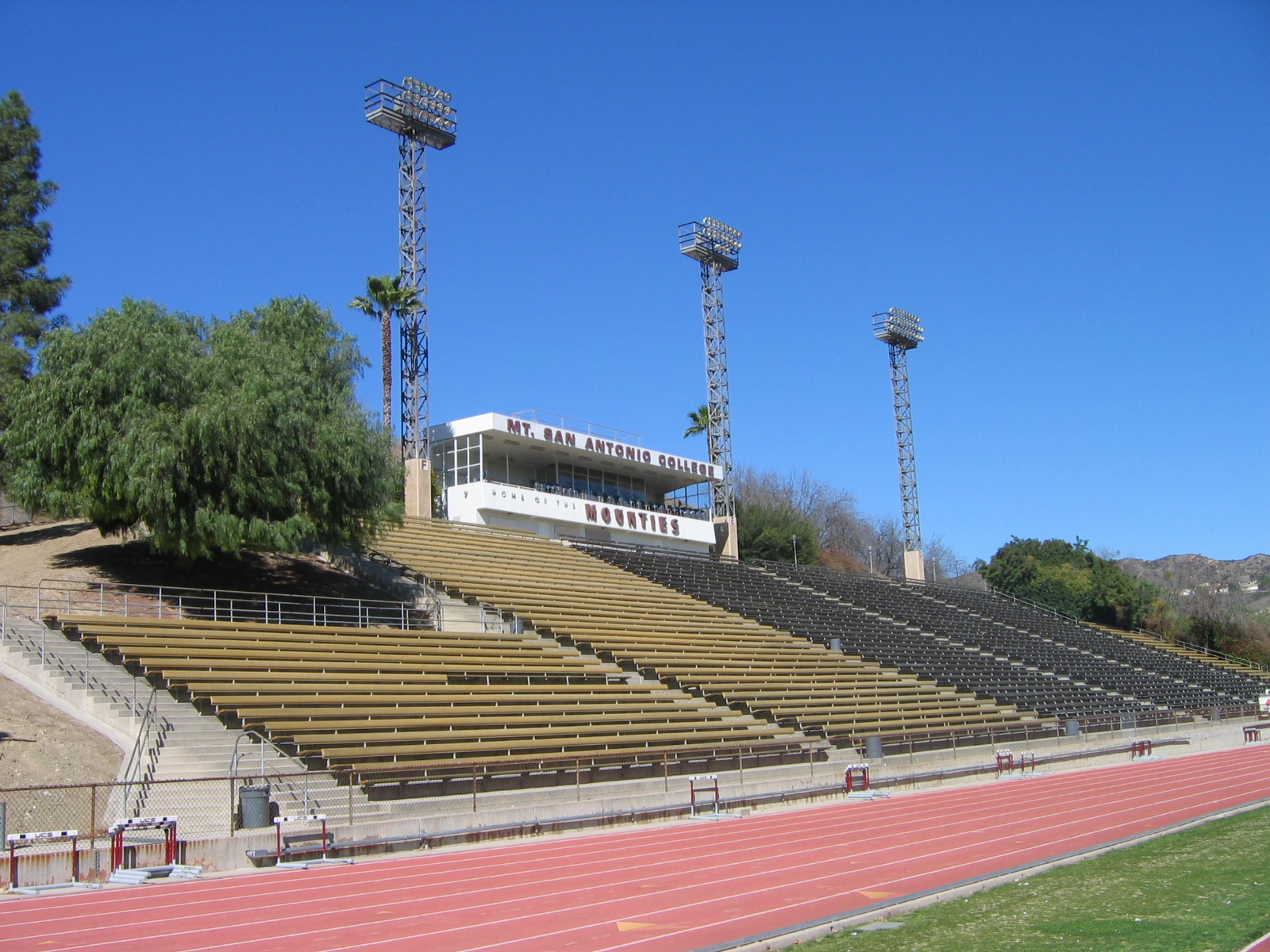
Hilmer Lodge Stadium before renovation

The Mt. San Antonio College (Mt. SAC) athletics teams, the "Mounties", have captured a total of 76 California Community College Athletic Association (CCCAA) state championships, with 49 titles coming since 2000. Mt. SAC currently fields 23 intercollegiate sports including: baseball (M), basketball (M & W), beach volleyball (W), cross country (M & W), football (M), golf (M & W), soccer (M & W), softball (W), swimming (M & W), tennis (M & W), track and field (M & W), volleyball (W), water polo (M & W), and wrestling (M). Mt. SAC competes in the South Coast Conference in most sports, with golf (Orange Empire), wrestling (So Cal Wrestling Alliance) and football (SoCal Football Association – National Division Central Conference) hosted in other conferences.

In 2015, Mt. SAC Athletics captured the 2014–2015 Learfield/IMG Sports Director's Cup, which is awarded to the nation's top overall athletics programs at the NCAA (I, II, III), NAIA, and community college levels. The Mounties have also captured nine Daktronics National Association of Two-Year College Administrators of Athletics (NATYCAA) Cup Championships, which is awarded to the western United States top overall community college athletics program. Since its inception in 2004, Mt. SAC has also captured five second-place trophies and finished in fourth place and sixth place.

The Mt. SAC track and field/cross country programs led all Mt. SAC programs with a combined total of 30 CCCAA championships (men's track 10, women's track 11, men's cross country 1, women's cross country 8). For the past ten years, women's basketball has led all sports with five state championships and four additional top four state championship finishes. Men's soccer has four state championships (two national championships) and three additional top four state championship finishes. Women's softball has two state championships and five additional top four state championship finishes. Football has three state championships (two national championships) and three additional top two state championship finishes.

=== Mt. SAC Relays ===
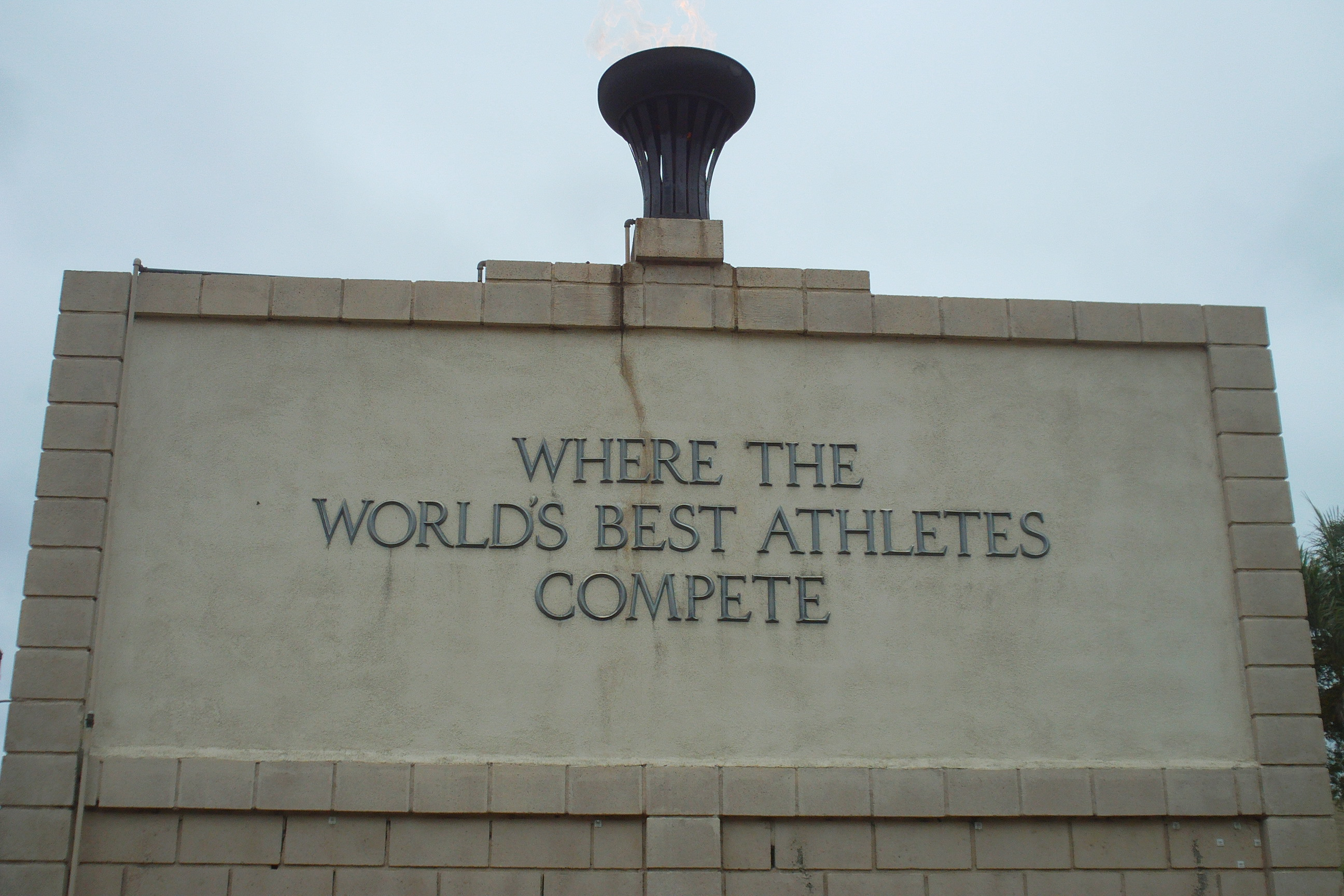
Olympic Flame and wall of honor at Hilmer Lodge Stadium

This event is held annually in April over a three-day period and attracts around 15,000 athletes from more than 150 colleges and universities and 150 high schools throughout the world. The relays are hosted in the college's stadium, Hilmer Lodge Stadium (12,500 expandable seating), which is named after Mt. SAC's first track and field/cross country coach. The stadium has nine 48" running lanes, 86' X 40' Daktronics screen, tifgreen Bermuda natural grass, Musco LED lighting, meeting rooms and a practice track facility with a Field Turf Field and field event practice facilities.

Famous participants at the Mt. SAC Relays include:

- Randy Barnes
- Ato Boldon
- Leroy Burrell
- Joaquim Cruz
- Gail Devers
- Stacy Dragila
- Allyson Felix
- Maurice Greene
- Allen Johnson
- Marion Jones
- Jackie Joyner-Kersee
- Bernard Lagat
- Carl Lewis
- Michael Marsh
- Sydney McLaughlin-Levrone
- Noureddine Morceli
- Edwin Moses
- Athing Mu
- Maria de Lurdes Mutola
- Merlene Ottey
- Mike Powell
- Bob Seagren
- Gabby Thomas
- Mike Tully
- Kevin Young

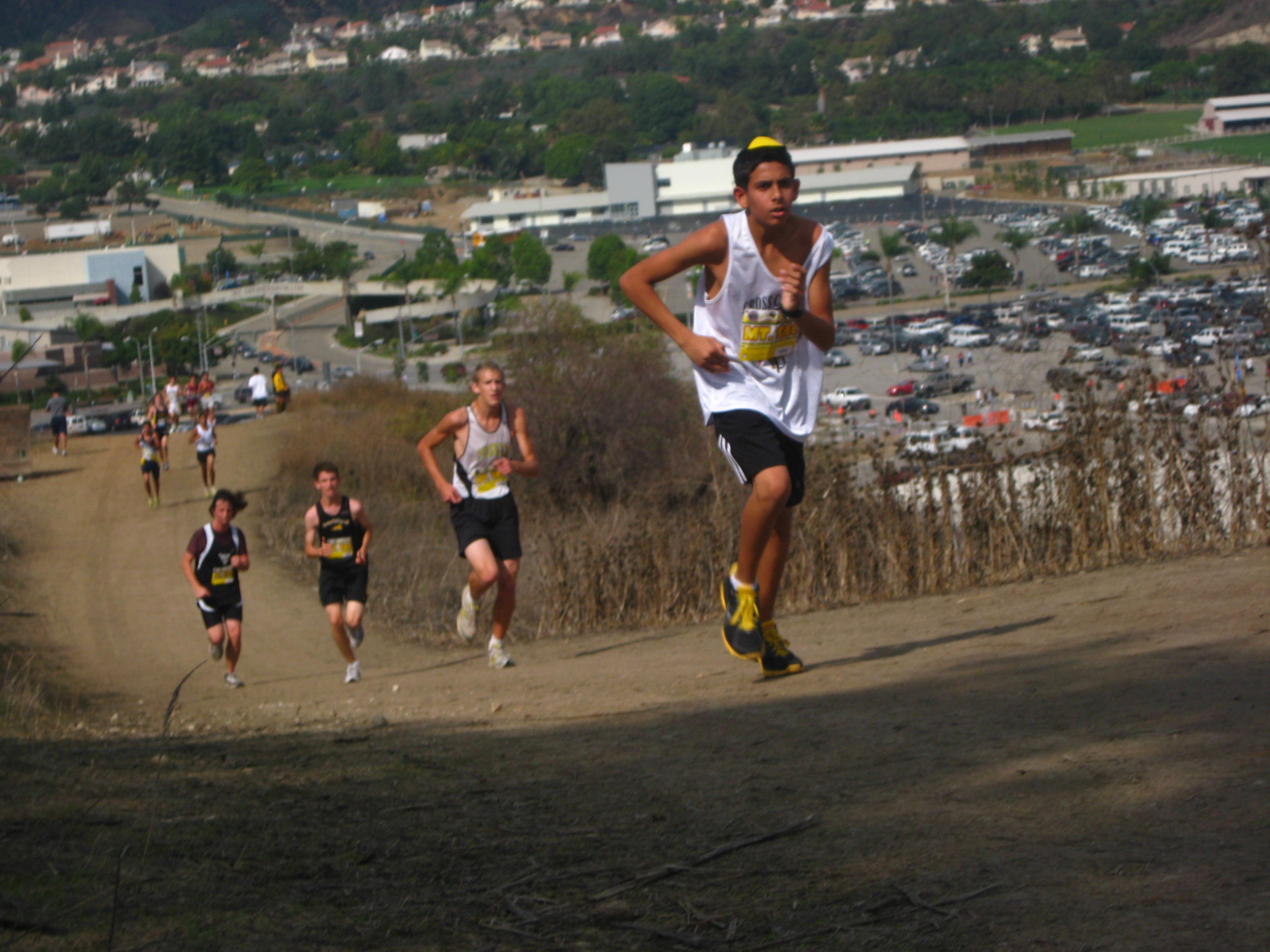
High school runners complete the third and final hill on the Mt. SAC course in 2010.

=== Cross Country Invitational ===
Since the first event in 1948, the Mt. SAC Cross Country Invitational has grown to be the largest event of its kind in the world. It is often rich in running tradition as generations within families may have run it in the past. Mt. SAC is considered one of the most challenging cross country courses in the nation. The races all take place over the course of two weekends usually in October.

The runners start on a long (former) airstrip and run over three hills. The Valley Loop is a flat loop in the beginning of the race where runners usually overtake others. The first mile, due to the flat and hard surface is extremely quick. This mile is immediately followed by the switchbacks up the side of the first hill. These consist of four tight-knit hairpin turns. The switchbacks are very technical as the runners are often closely packed entering this area, and the hill itself is both steep and loosely packed. Arguably, the most challenging obstacle is the infamous "poop out" hill, which is the steepest hill on the course (as well as one of the shortest). The final climb runners must conquer before a steep descent to the flat finish area is Reservoir Hill, which is a steady uphill. The end of the race loops back to the beginning (on the airstrip), passing behind where the runners for the next race are staged. It is also designed for speed and wraps right around the spectator area for a finish at the gate entering Hilmer Lodge Stadium. The current course high school record holders are Boys 14:23, Austin Tamagno (Brea Olinda), 2014, and Girls 15:49, Claudia Lane (Malibu), 2017.

== Notable alumni ==
- Alfonso Boone, professional football player
- Sammie Burroughs, professional football player
- Anthony Calvillo, professional football player
- Javier Castro, professional soccer player
- Ronald Cheng, singer and actor
- Mark Clear, professional baseball player
- Kevin Craft, college football player
- Tommy Haynes, professional football player
- Dan Henderson, professional mixed martial arts fighter
- Mike Hohensee, professional football player and coach
- Bruce Irvin, professional football player
- Avi Kaplan, musician
- Joe Keough, professional baseball player
- Giovanni Lanaro, Olympic pole vaulter
- Tony Lorick (1941–2013), professional football player
- Kent McCord, actor
- Chris McAlister, professional football player
- Gary Miller, politician
- Sona Movsesian, author, executive assistant, and podcaster
- Halakilangi Muagututia, professional football player
- Antonio Pierce, professional football player and coach
- Dante Santiago, music executive and recording artist
- Bob Seagren Olympic gold medalist
- Rocky Seto, professional football coach
- Sam Shepard, playwright, actor, and musician
- Les Shy, professional football player
- Nadya Suleman, mother of octuplets known as "Octomom"
- Nu'u Tafisi, professional football player
- Brett Tomko, professional baseball player
- Edward Ulloa, attorney and former criminal prosecutor
- Javier Vazquez, wrestler and mixed martial arts fighter
- Delanie Walker, professional football player
- Taco Wallace, professional football player
- Chris Woodward, professional baseball player and coach
- Shawn Wooten, professional baseball player
- Tony Zendejas, professional football player
- Rachaad White, professional football player
