= Hilmer Lodge Stadium =

Athletic stadium in Walnut, California

Coordinates: 34.04585°N 117.836459°W

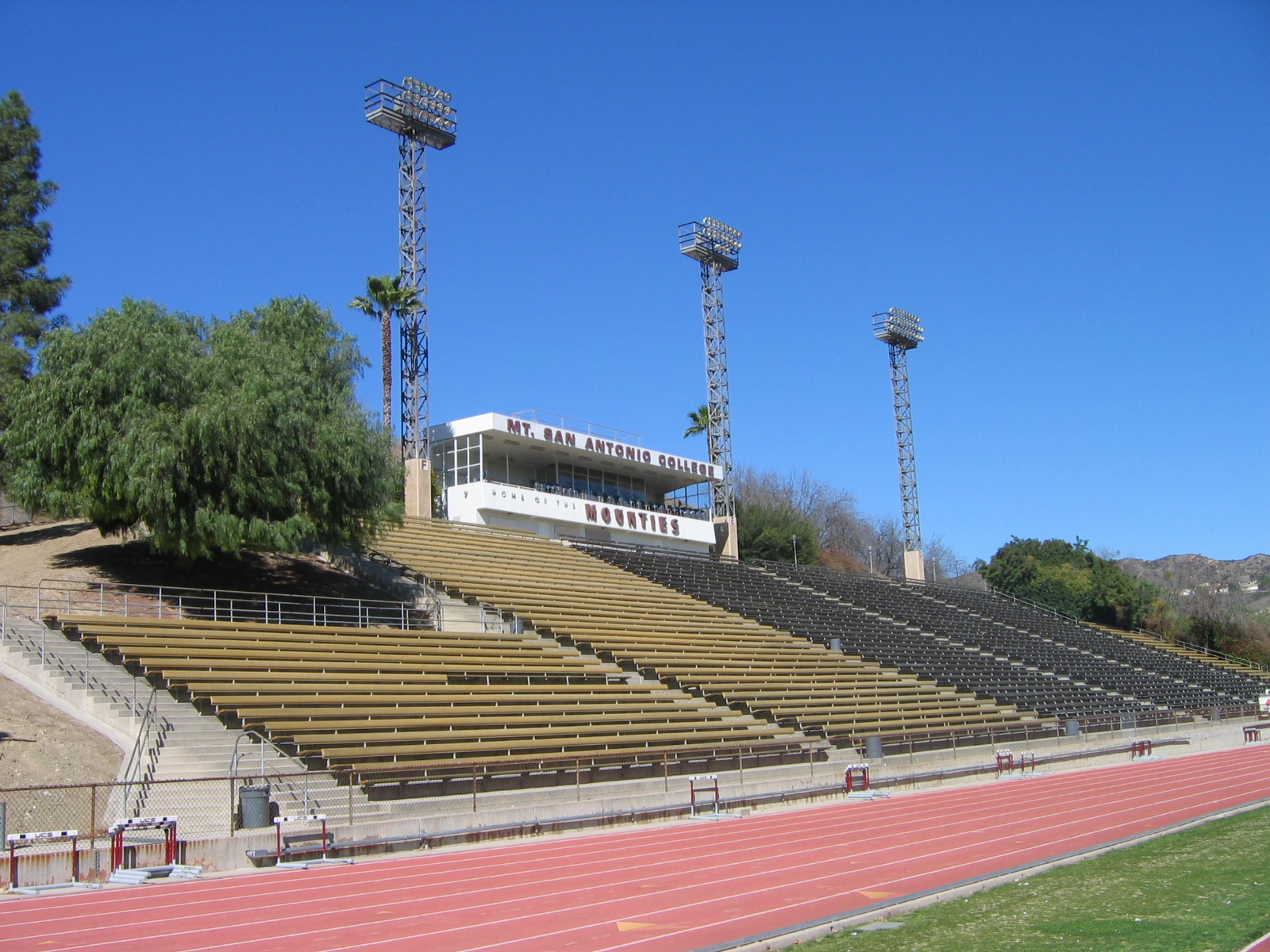
The west stands at Hilmer Lodge Stadium

Hilmer Lodge Stadium on the Mt. San Antonio College (Mt. SAC) campus in Walnut, California, is the athletic stadium for the community college and home to the Mt. SAC Relays.

Originally known as Mt. San Antonio College Stadium or Mt. SAC Stadium, the stadium was dedicated on October 8, 1948 by then local congressman, Richard Nixon. The venue was renamed in the early 1990's after Hilmer Lodge, who created the relays in 1959 and was the college's first track and field and cross country coach. Lodge, who died in 1977, was part of the inaugural Mt. SAC Relays Hall of Fame.

The stadium is also the finish for the Mt. SAC Cross Country Course, which hosts as many as 28,000 participants for the Mt. SAC Cross Country Invitational. It also plays host to the CIF Southern Section cross country prelims and finals, and the Western Regional of the Foot Locker Cross Country Championships.

Hilmer Lodge Stadium hosted the USA Outdoor Track and Field Championships in 1962, 1979, and 1980. It also played host to the United States women's Olympic Trials in 1968. In 2018, the stadium was selected as site for the 2020 US Track and Field Olympic Trials, but the $118 million renovation was threatened by multiple lawsuits from neighbors of the college. On August 2, 2018, USATF announced that Hayward Field in Eugene, Oregon had been selected to host the competition. In July 2018, the stadium was completely renovated and opened February 24, 2020 with the ability to expand seating to 21,000 for special events. In 1967, the stadium received an upgrade to aluminum bleachers.The stadium was used as a location for the 1989 Wes Craven film Shocker.

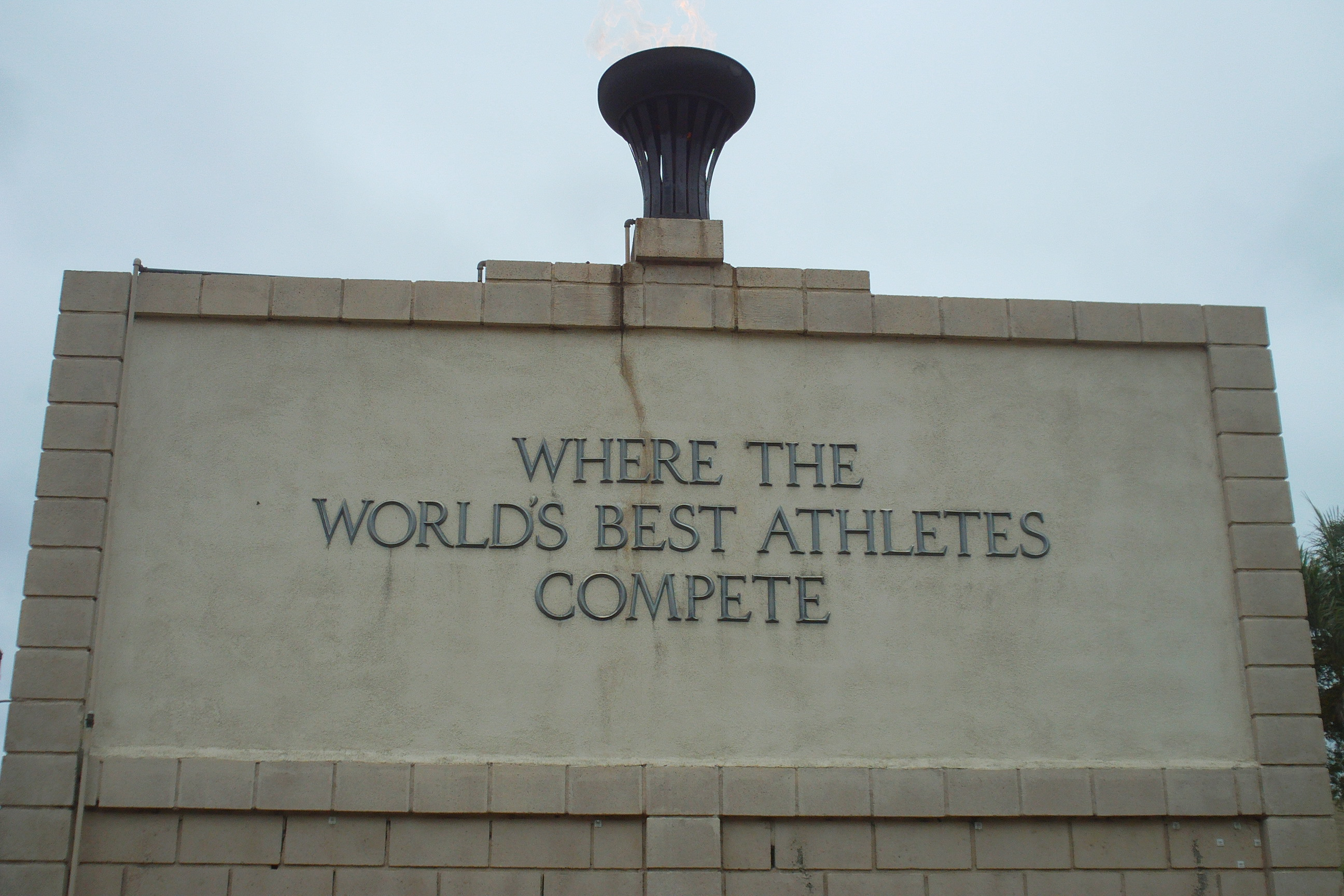
Olympic Flame and wall of honor at Hilmer Lodge Stadium
