= National Register of Historic Places listings in Lafayette County, Missouri =

Location of Lafayette County in Missouri

This is a list of the National Register of Historic Places listings in Lafayette County, Missouri.

This is intended to be a complete list of the properties and districts on the National Register of Historic Places in Lafayette County, Missouri, United States. Latitude and longitude coordinates are provided for many National Register properties and districts; these locations may be seen together in a map.

There are 32 properties and districts listed on the National Register in the county.
This National Park Service list is complete through NPS recent listings posted April 24, 2026.

== Current listings ==
	Name on the Register	Image	Date listed	Location	City or town	Description
1	Anderson House and Lexington Battlefield	Anderson House and Lexington Battlefield	June 4, 1969 (#69000110)	Roughly bounded by 10th, 15th, Utah and Wood Sts., and Missouri Pacific RR; 39°11′34″N 93°52′46″W	Lexington	
2	Napoleon Buck House	Napoleon Buck House	November 14, 1997 (#97001431)	0.40 mi. S of jct. of US 24 and MO 273; 39°11′49″N 93°32′09″W	Waverly	No longer in existence
3	Minatree Catron House		November 14, 1997 (#97001432)	0.1 mi W of jct. of US 24 and MO 110; 39°10′49″N 93°47′55″W	Lexington	
4	John E. Cheatham House		July 8, 1993 (#93000550)	739 MO 13; 39°10′21″N 93°52′45″W	Lexington	
5	Chicago and Alton Railroad Depot at Higginsville	Chicago and Alton Railroad Depot at Higginsville	March 25, 1987 (#87000451)	2109 Main St. 39°04′25″N 93°43′00″W	Higginsville	
6	Commercial Community Historic District		August 4, 1983 (#83001025)	Roughly bounded by 8th, 13th, South, Broadway, and Main Sts. 39°11′09″N 93°52′52″W	Lexington	
7	Confederate Chapel, Cemetery and Cottage	Confederate Chapel, Cemetery and Cottage	December 16, 1981 (#81000335)	N of Higginsville; 39°05′54″N 93°43′45″W	Higginsville	
8	Cumberland Presbyterian Church	Cumberland Presbyterian Church	November 14, 1978 (#78001665)	112 S. 13th St. 39°11′06″N 93°52′45″W	Lexington	
9	James M. Dinwiddie House	James M. Dinwiddie House	November 14, 1997 (#97001430)	0.25 mi. E of jct. of US 24 and MO 184; 39°11′32″N 93°42′06″W	Dover	
10	Douglass School	Douglass School	March 10, 2023 (#100008715)	215 West 16th St. 39°04′44″N 93°43′15″W	Higginsville	
11	Forest Grove Cemetery		July 18, 2022 (#100007905)	892 Golf Rd. 39°12′03″N 93°51′54″W	Lexington vicinity	
12	Theodore Gosewisch House	Theodore Gosewisch House	November 14, 1997 (#97001433)	0.5 mi. W of jct. of MO 13 and Marshall School Rd. 39°09′28″N 93°53′30″W	Lexington	
13	Alexander and Elizabeth Aull Graves House		July 8, 1993 (#93000552)	2326 Aull Ln. 39°10′32″N 93°51′56″W	Lexington	No longer in existence
14	Hicklin Hearthstone		December 28, 1982 (#82000585)	E of Lexington on US 24; 39°11′10″N 93°49′44″W	Lexington	
15	Hicklin School		February 24, 2004 (#04000088)	MO 24; 39°11′05″N 93°49′29″W	Lexington	
16	Highland Avenue Historic District	Highland Avenue Historic District	August 4, 1983 (#83001026)	Roughly bounded by Highland Ave. from Rock to Bluff Sts. 39°11′04″N 93°52′30″W	Lexington	
17	House at 1413 Lafayette St.		March 25, 1999 (#99000379)	1413 Lafayette St. 39°11′13″N 93°52′39″W	Lexington	
18	Houx-Hoefer-Rehkop House	Houx-Hoefer-Rehkop House	March 29, 1983 (#83001027)	1900 Walnut St. 39°04′33″N 93°43′07″W	Higginsville	
19	David John House		July 8, 1993 (#93000553)	103 S. 23rd St. 39°11′06″N 93°51′23″W	Lexington	No longer in existence
20	George Johnson House		July 8, 1993 (#93000554)	102 S. 30th St. 39°11′07″N 93°51′16″W	Lexington	
21	Lafayette County Courthouse	Lafayette County Courthouse	September 22, 1970 (#70000339)	Public Sq. 39°11′06″N 93°52′49″W	Lexington	
22	Linwood Lawn		April 23, 1973 (#73001044)	SE of Lexington off U.S. 24; 39°09′55″N 93°50′54″W	Lexington	
23	Machpelah Cemetery		June 27, 2022 (#100007825)	900 South 20th St. 39°10′40″N 93°52′22″W	Lexington	
24	Odessa Ice Cream Company Building	Odessa Ice Cream Company Building	October 3, 1996 (#96001065)	101 W. Dryden St. 38°59′36″N 93°57′15″W	Odessa	
25	Old Neighborhoods Historic District	Old Neighborhoods Historic District	August 4, 1983 (#83001028)	Roughly bounded by 13th, 22nd, South Sts., Forest and Washington Aves. 39°11′08″N 93°52′28″W	Lexington	
26	William P. Robinson House		November 14, 1997 (#97001428)	).2 mi. E and 0.15 mi. S of jct. of MO 107 and MO 112; 39°09′41″N 93°50′24″W	Lexington	
27	Thomas Shelby House		November 14, 1997 (#97001429)	0.25 mi. E of US 24 and MO 111; 39°10′47″N 93°47′09″W	Lexington	Demolished(?)
28	Spratt-Allen-Aull House		July 8, 1993 (#93000555)	2321 Aull Ln. 39°10′30″N 93°51′57″W	Lexington	
29	Thomas Talbot and Rebecca Walton Smithers Stramcke House		September 29, 1999 (#99001208)	15834 Highway O 39°08′24″N 93°52′57″W	Lexington	
30	D. W. B. and Julia Waddell Tevis House		July 8, 1993 (#93000556)	505 S. 13th St. 39°10′43″N 93°52′43″W	Lexington	
31	Waddell House	Waddell House	October 11, 1979 (#79001378)	1704 South St. 39°11′02″N 93°52′29″W	Lexington	
32	Wentworth Military Academy	Wentworth Military Academy	November 24, 1980 (#80002373)	Washington Ave. and 18th St. 39°11′14″N 93°52′22″W	Lexington	

== See also ==
- List of National Historic Landmarks in Missouri
- National Register of Historic Places listings in Missouri
