= Highland Avenue Historic District =

Highland Avenue Historic District may refer to:

- Highland Avenue Historic District (Birmingham, Alabama), listed on the National Register of Historic Places in Birmingham, Alabama
- Highland Avenue Historic District (Lexington, Missouri), listed on the National Register of Historic Places in Lafayette County, Missouri
