= Battle of Lexington State Historic Site =

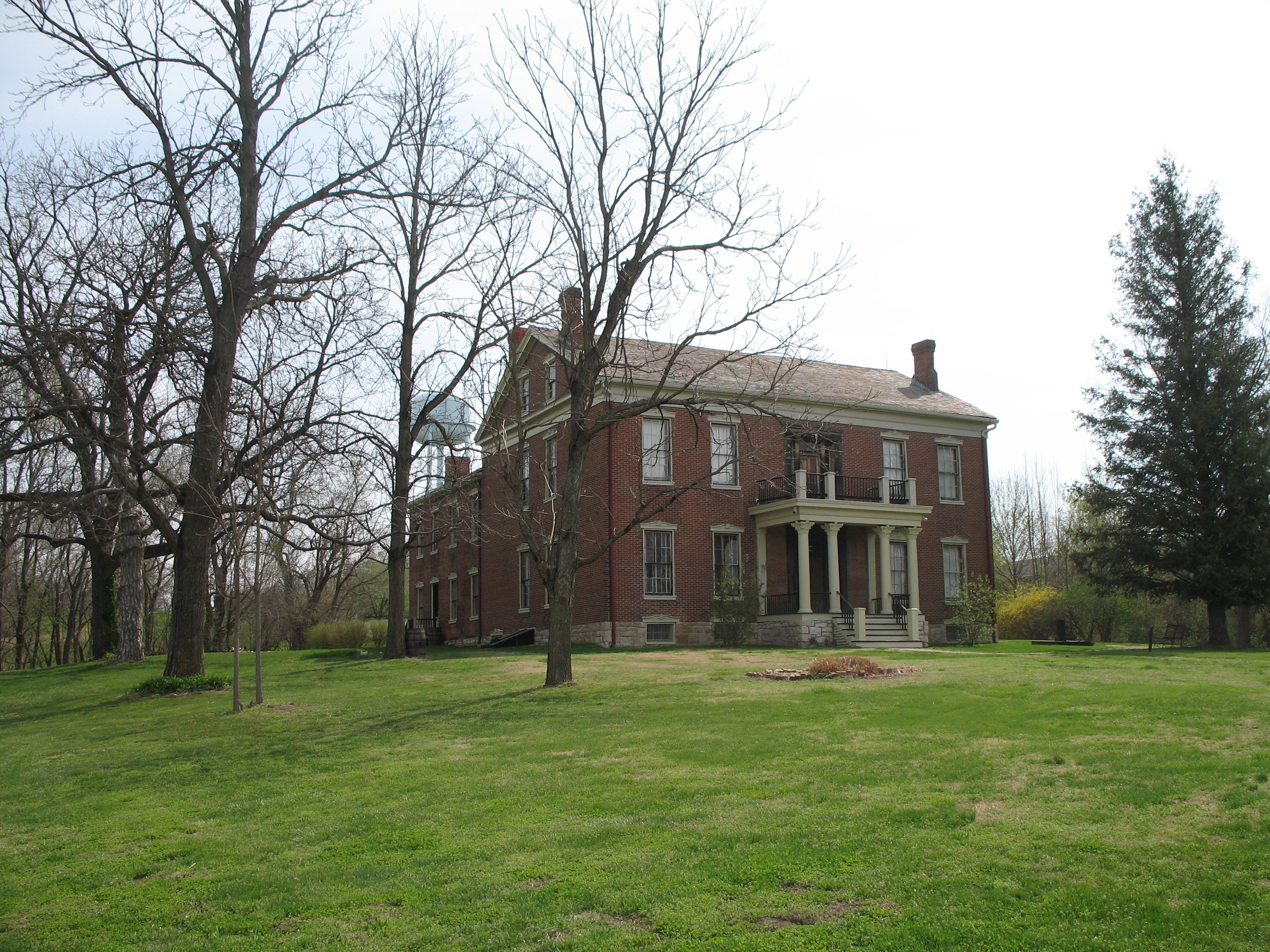
- Anderson House, a Union hospital, was attacked by Confederates during the battle

- Location in Missouri
- 39°11′33″N 93°52′34″W
- Location: Lexington, Missouri

History
- Established: 1958
- Original use: Battlefield

Site notes
- Area: 94.57 acres (38.27 ha)
- Governing body: Missouri Department of Natural Resources
- Visitors: 28,165 (in 2017)
- Website: Battle of Lexington State Historic Site

U.S. National Register of Historic Places
- Official name: Anderson House and Lexington Battlefield
- Designated: June 4, 1969
- Reference no.: 69000110

The Battle of Lexington State Historic Site is a state-owned property located in the city of Lexington, Missouri. The site was established in 1958 to preserve the grounds where an American Civil War battle took place in 1861 between Confederate troops led by Major-General Sterling Price and federal troops led by Colonel James A. Mulligan. The site offers a short battlefield loop trail, picnicking, and tours of the battlegrounds and Oliver Anderson mansion.

== See also ==
- List of Missouri state parks
- National Register of Historic Places listings in Lafayette County, Missouri
