= John H. Felt =

American architect

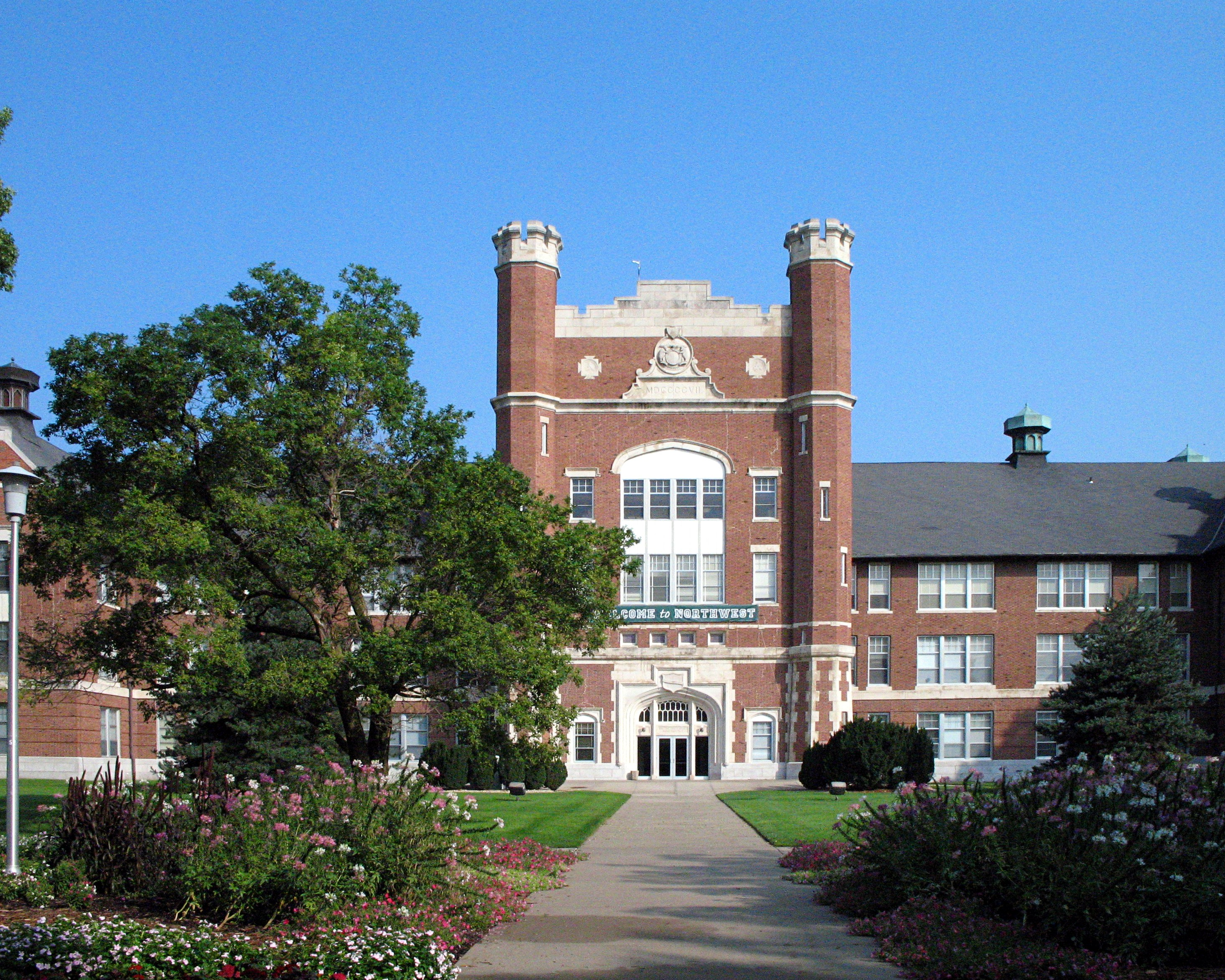
Administration building at Northwest Missouri State University

John H. Felt (1867, Indiana – 1938, Missouri) was an architect who designed many churches, schools, and government buildings in Missouri and Kansas.

He was born in Indiana and moved to St. Joseph, Missouri in 1898 where he formed J.H. Felt & Company.

In 1937 he moved to Kansas City where he was senior at the firm Felt, Dunham & Kriehn, and in 1936 following Mr. Dunham's withdrawal, continued under the name of Felt & Kriehn.

Among the buildings he designed are the Administration Buildings at Northwest Missouri State University and Emporia State University and the Boone County, Missouri Courthouse.

In 1904 he became publisher of Modern Architecture magazine.

== Buildings on the National Register of Historic Places ==
Felt has multiple structures in two historic districts, a city hall and two schools on the National Register of Historic Places.

Ref	Property	Address	City	Listed
02000817	Krug Park Place Historic District	Roughly bounded by St. Joseph Ave., Myrtle St., Clark St., and Magnolia Ave.,	St. Joseph, Missouri	2002-08-01
04000088	Hicklin School (Lexington High School)	MO 24	Lexington, Missouri	2004-02-24
85000455	Greenfield Courthouse Square Historic District	Roughly bounded by North, Hinchman, South and Pennsylvania Sts.	Greenfield, Indiana	1985-03-07
79001362	City Hall	MO 111	Forest City, Missouri	1979-06-27
96001381	George Washington Carver School	909 Westminster	Fulton, Missouri	1996-12-02
08001208	Charles Barr House	25 W. Walnut St.	Greenfield, Indiana	2008-12-22
