= Cheatham House =

Cheatham House refers to two NRHP listed Houses:

- Mansfield Cheatham House, Robertson County, Tennessee, NRHP-Nr. 78002626
- John E. Cheatham House, Lafayette County, Missouri, NRHP-Nr. 93000550
