= Saluda (steamship) =

Steamship involved in 1852 disaster

Coordinates: 39°11′09″N 93°53′52″W

History
- Fate: Exploded and sank 9 April 1852

General characteristics
- Installed power: Steam engine
- Propulsion: Paddlewheel

The Saluda was a paddle steamer that operated on the Missouri River in the early 1850s. The ship exploded near Lexington, Missouri in 1852, killing over 100 people, making it one of the worst disasters in Missouri River history.

== Disaster ==
In March 1852, Saluda left St. Louis for Council Bluffs, Iowa, carrying many Mormon immigrants from England and Wales. The river was muddy, icy, and running high when Saluda stopped at Lexington for supplies before continuing her journey. Just beyond Lexington, a narrow channel with very strong currents made it difficult for ships to make a sharp turn in the river. Saluda's Captain, Francis T. Belt, tried unsuccessfully for two days to make the bend. On Good Friday morning, 9 April 1852, Captain Belt, frustrated by the lack of progress, ordered an increase in steam pressure. Saluda pushed off, but before the paddlewheel got through its second rotation, the boilers exploded. The explosion could be heard for miles. Those watching from the bluffs in Lexington saw parts of the steamer and bodies blown into the air. They landed in the river, on the wharf, and even on the nearby bluff.

Over 100 people were killed, including Captain Belt, many of the passengers, and two men on shore who were hit by debris. Because of the strong current, many bodies were never recovered. Only 40 to 50 people survived. Some of the survivors were pulled onto a passing boat heading down the Missouri River. Within ten minutes of the explosion, Saluda had sunk.

The community of Lexington rushed to help. Doctors worked on the injured, while survivors were cared for in local homes. A fund was raised to bury the dead in local Macpelah Cemetery, as well as to help with the financial needs of the survivors. The townspeople in Lexington took some of the orphaned children into their homes and raised them as their own.

== See also ==
- Lexington Historical Museum
