= James A. Mulligan =

American army general (1830–1864)

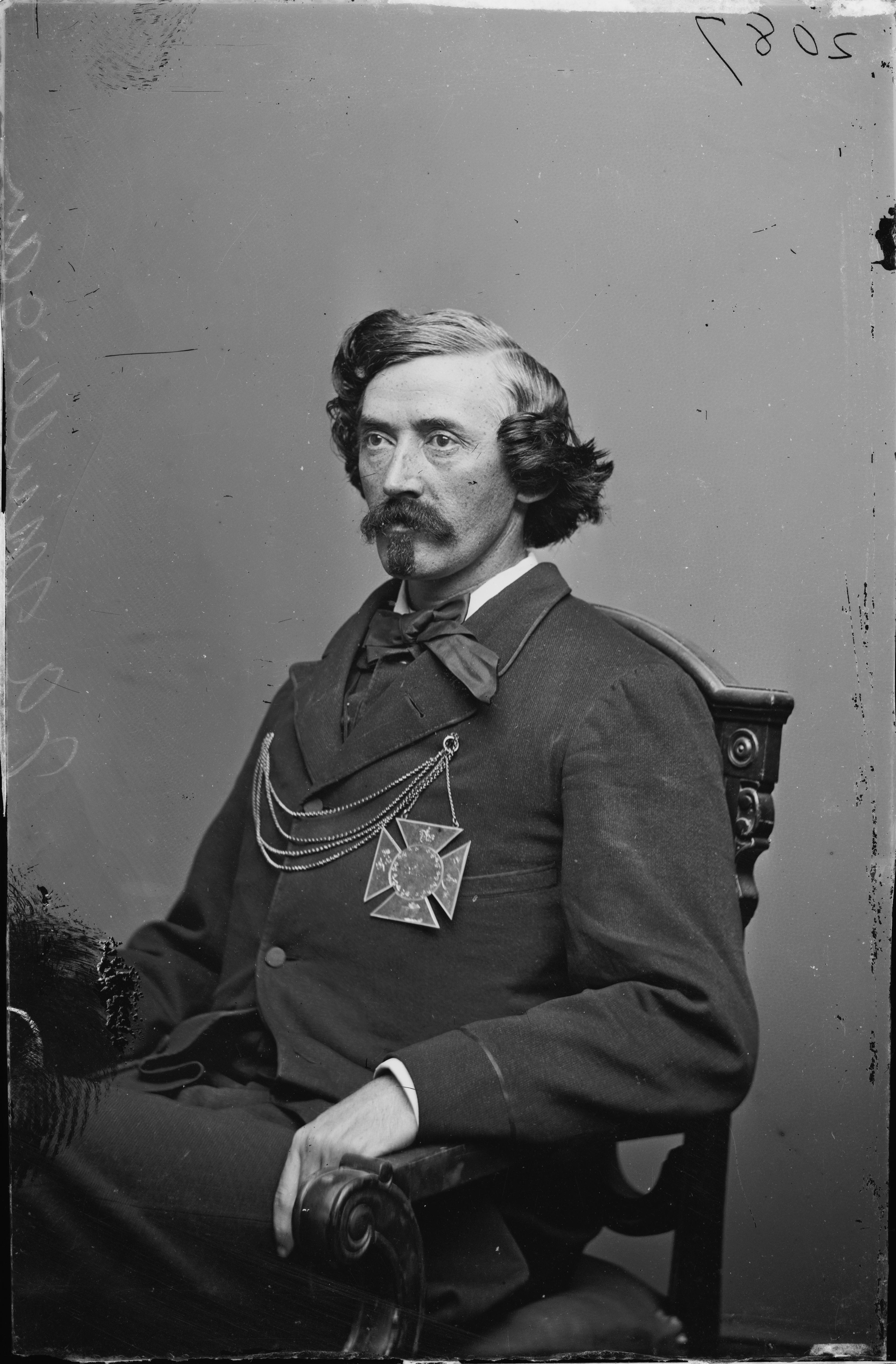
- Born: June 30, 1830; Utica, New York
- Died: July 26, 1864 (aged 34) near Winchester, Virginia
- Burial place: Calvary Cemetery, Evanston, Illinois
- Military career
- Allegiance: United States
- Branch: United States Army
- Service years: 1861 - 1864
- Rank: Colonel; Brevet Brigadier General
- Commands: 23rd Illinois Volunteer Infantry Regiment; Camp Douglas (Chicago)
- Conflicts: American Civil War

James Adelbert Mulligan (June 30, 1830 – July 26, 1864) was colonel of the 23rd Illinois Volunteer Infantry Regiment in the Union Army during the American Civil War. On February 20, 1865, the United States Senate confirmed the posthumous appointment of Mulligan to the rank of brevet brigadier general of U.S. Volunteers to rank from July 23, 1864, the day before he was mortally wounded at the Second Battle of Kernstown, near Winchester, Virginia. He commanded the Federal forces at the First Battle of Lexington, and later distinguished himself in other engagements in the eastern theater prior to his death in battle.

== Biography ==
=== Early life ===
James Mulligan was born June 30, 1830, in Utica, New York. His parents had immigrated from Ireland, and his father died when he was a child. His mother remarried a Michael Lantry of Chicago, Illinois, and moved there with her son, who later attended the St. Mary's on the Lake College of North Chicago. From 1852–54 Mulligan read law in the offices of Isaac N. Arnold, U.S. Representative from the city. He was admitted to the bar in 1856, and commissioned a second lieutenant in the "Chicago Shield Guards".

=== Raising the Irish Brigade ===
At the onset of the Civil War, Mulligan raised the 23rd Illinois Volunteer Infantry Regiment in 1861, which was locally known as the "Irish Brigade" (not to be confused with a New York unit by the same name). This unit included the "Chicago Shield Guards". In September 1861, he led his troops toward Lexington, Missouri, as word had been received that this vital river town would be attacked by the pro-Confederate Missouri State Guard under Major General Sterling Price.

=== Battle of Lexington ===
The First Battle of Lexington, often referred to as the "Battle of the Hemp Bales", commenced on September 13, 1861, when 12,500 soldiers of the Missouri State Guard began a siege of Mulligan's diminutive command (only 3,500 in all), entrenched around the town's old Masonic College. On September 18, Price's army mounted an all-out assault on Mulligan's works, which failed. Cannon fire continued throughout the 19th. On the 20th, units of Price's army used hemp bales soaked in the Missouri River as a moving breastworks to work their way up the river bluffs toward Mulligan's headquarters. By 2:00 p.m., Mulligan had surrendered. Combined casualties were 64 dead, and 192 wounded. Price was reportedly so impressed by Mulligan's demeanor and conduct during and after the battle that he offered him his own horse and buggy, and ordered him safely escorted to Union lines.

=== Camp Douglas ===
Mulligan was commander of Camp Douglas, a prisoner of war camp in Chicago, from February 25, 1862, to June 14, 1862. The camp had been constructed as a short term training camp for Union soldiers but was converted to a prisoner of war camp for captured Confederate soldiers after the fall of Fort Donelson, on February 16, 1862. One in eight of the prisoners from Fort Donelson died of pneumonia and various diseases. The camp became infamous for its inhumane conditions and large death toll. Mulligan may have been a poor administrator, but unlike some later commandants, he had made efforts to improve conditions at the camp which were hampered by an inadequate budget and bureaucratic indifference. He may have been influenced in his effort to improve conditions at the camp by his treatment by General Price after he was captured at Lexington, Missouri.

=== Middle Department duty ===
Mulligan and his regiment were assigned to the Railroad Division of the Middle Department between December 17, 1862, and March 27, 1863. Then they were assigned to 5th Brigade, 1st Division, VIII Corps in the Middle Department between March 27, 1863, and June 26, 1863.

=== Fort Mulligan ===
Between August and December 1863, Mulligan oversaw the construction of Fort Mulligan, an earthworks fortification located in Grant County, West Virginia. Confederate Maj. Gen. Jubal Early would later pay tribute to Mulligan's engineering skill after occupying the fort during his Valley campaigns of 1864. This fort remains one of the best-preserved Civil War fortifications in West Virginia, and has become a local tourist attraction.

=== Battle of Leetown ===
On July 3, 1864, only three weeks before his death, Mulligan distinguished himself in the Battle of Leetown, fought in and around Leetown, Virginia, between Union Maj. Gen. Franz Sigel and Confederate Maj. Gen. Jubal Early. Federal troops were retreating in the face of Early's relentless advance down the Shenandoah Valley during his Second Valley Campaign. Hoping to buy time to concentrate Union forces and supplies, Sigel ordered Mulligan to hold Leestown for as long as possible. The colonel was only allotted two regiments of infantry (including his old 23rd Illinois), five pieces of artillery, and 1,000 dismounted cavalrymen; he faced six Confederate infantry divisions, five brigades of cavalry and three battalions of artillery. Mulligan was told to expect no help whatsoever; he was to hold as long as possible, then conduct a fighting retreat as slowly as possible to cover the other withdrawing Union units.

The battle began at 6:00 a.m. on the morning of July 3 when Maj. Gen. Robert Ransom, in command of Early's cavalry, ordered Brig. Gen. Bradley T. Johnson to attack at Leetown. At the same time another cavalry unit charged 600 Union cavalry stationed at Darkesville, while 1,100 Confederate cavalry under Brig. Gen. John McCausland swung around the Union force at North Mountain and Williamsport Road, capturing the North Mountain Depot.

Mulligan led his minuscule force out of their trenches after Johnson's initial charge, driving the attackers back upon the divisions of Generals Robert Rodes and Stephen D. Ramseur. Although the outcome of the battle was a foregone conclusion, Mulligan managed to hold Early's main force at Leestown for the entire day before being compelled to give way—albeit very slowly. Mulligan continued to battle Early all the way from Leestown to Martinsburg, Virginia, buying valuable time for Union commanders to concentrate their forces in the Valley.

=== Death ===
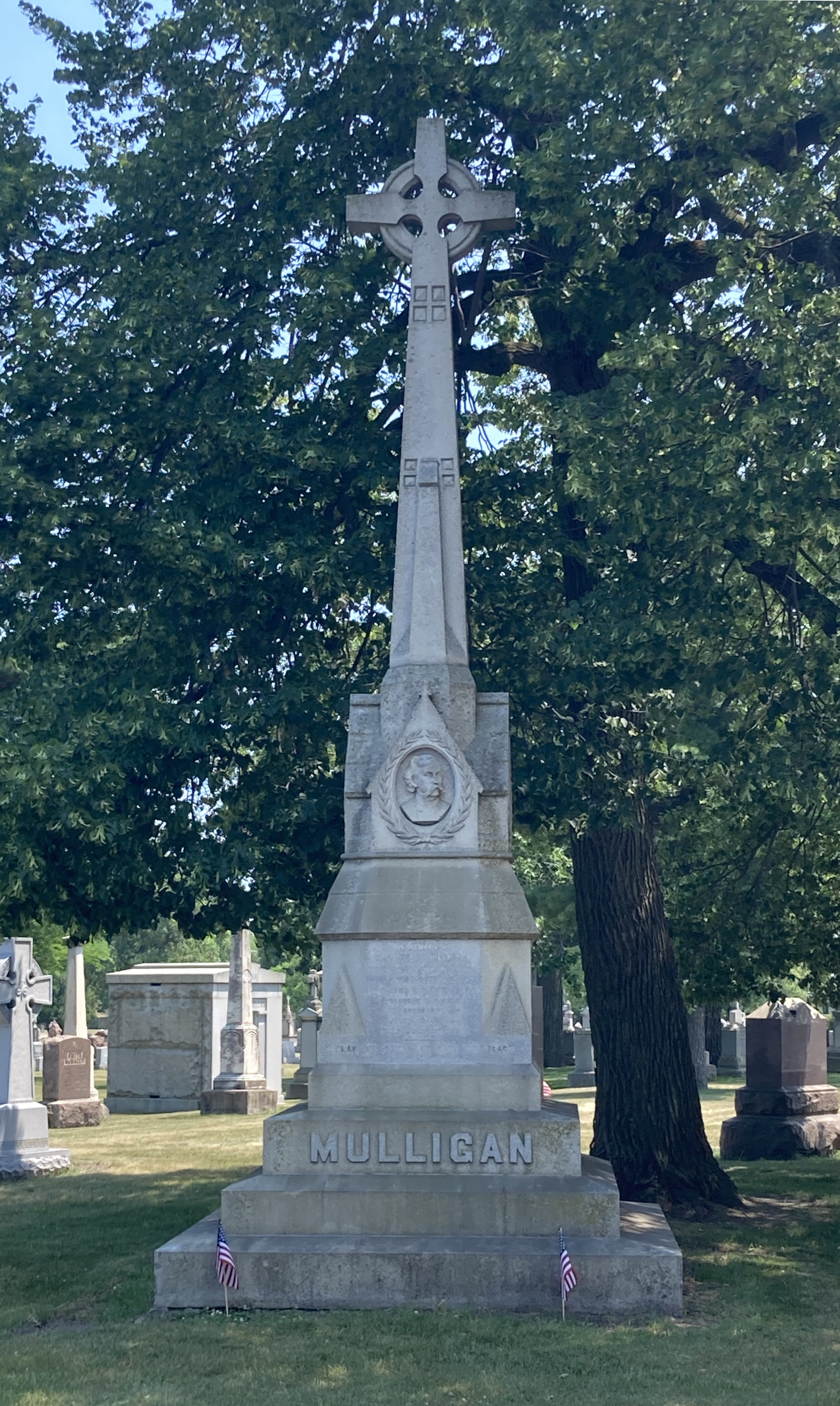
Mulligan's grave at Calvary Cemetery

On July 24, 1864, Mulligan led his troops into the Second Battle of Kernstown, near Winchester, Virginia. Late in the afternoon, Maj. Gen. John B. Gordon's Confederate force attacked Mulligan's 1,800 soldiers from ground beyond Opequon Church. Mulligan briefly held off Gordon's units, but Confederate Maj. Gen. John C. Breckinridge led a devastating flank attack against the Irishmen from the east side of the Valley Pike. Sharpshooters under Ramseur then attacked Mulligan's right flank from the west. Now encompassed on three sides, the Union battle line fell apart.

With Confederates closing from all around, Mulligan ordered his troops to withdraw. As he stood up in his saddle to spur his men on, Southern sharpshooters concealed in a nearby stream bed managed to hit the Union commander. Mulligan's soldiers endeavored to carry him to safety, but the unyielding Confederate fire made this an impossible task. Mulligan was well aware of his situation, and the danger his men were in, and so he famously ordered: "Lay me down and save the flag." Mulligan's men reluctantly complied. Confederate soldiers captured Mulligan, and carried the mortally wounded colonel into a nearby home, where he died two days later. He was buried at Calvary Cemetery in Evanston, Illinois.

== See also ==
- List of American Civil War brevet generals (Union)
- Lexington Historical Museum
