= Alexander Graves =

American politician

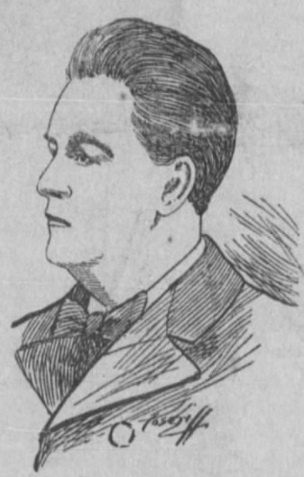
- Lexington Intelligencer (Lexington, MO), April 19, 1902

Member of the U.S. House of Representatives from Missouri's 5th district
- In office March 4, 1883 – March 3, 1885
- Preceded by: Richard P. Bland
- Succeeded by: William Warner

Personal details
- Born: August 25, 1844 Mount Carmel, Mississippi
- Died: December 23, 1916 (aged 72) Lexington, Missouri
- Party: Democratic
- Education: University of Virginia at Charlottesville

Military service
- Allegiance: Confederate States of America
- Branch/service: Confederate States Army

Alexander Graves (August 25, 1844 – December 23, 1916) was a U.S. Representative from Missouri.

== Biography ==
Born in Mount Carmel, Mississippi, Graves attended Centre College in Danville, Kentucky. At the outbreak of the Civil War, he joined the Confederate States Army and served under General Nathan Bedford Forrest and was paroled with him at Gainesville, Alabama, in May 1865. After being mustered out, he returned to college and was graduated from Oakland (later Alcorn) University, Mississippi, in July 1867. He studied law. He was graduated from the University of Virginia at Charlottesville in June 1869. He was admitted to the bar and practiced law in Lexington, Missouri where he was city attorney in 1872. He served as prosecuting attorney of Lafayette County, Missouri, in 1874.

Graves was elected as a Democrat to the Forty-eighth Congress (March 4, 1883 – March 3, 1885). He was an unsuccessful candidate for reelection in 1884 to the Forty-ninth Congress. He continued the practice of law until his death in Lexington, Missouri, on December 23, 1916. He was interred in Machpelah Cemetery.

The Alexander and Elizabeth Aull Graves House was listed on the National Register of Historic Places in 1993.

== Sources ==
- United States Congress. "Alexander Graves (id: G000390)". Biographical Directory of the United States Congress.

U.S. House of Representatives
Preceded by Richard P. Bland	Member of the U.S. House of Representatives from Missouri's 5th congressional district 1883–1885	Succeeded by William Warner
