= Linwood Lawn =

Historic house in Missouri, United States

- U.S. National Register of Historic Places
- Location within Missouri Location within the United States
- Location: SE of Lexington off U.S. 24, near Lexington, Missouri
- Coordinates: 39°9′55″N 93°50′54″W
- Area: 9.9 acres (4.0 ha)
- Built: c. 1850-1854
- Architectural style: Italianate
- NRHP reference No.: 73001044
- Added to NRHP: April 23, 1973

Linwood Lawn is a historic home located at Lexington, Lafayette County, Missouri. It was built between 1850 and 1854, and is a two-story, rectangular, Italianate style brick dwelling. It measures 71 feet by 110 feet and features a heavy cornice, detailed balustrades, bay windows, and detailed columns. Also on the property is a contributing brick, octagonal ice house.

It was listed on the National Register of Historic Places in 1973.
