= Hicklin School =

- U.S. National Register of Historic Places
- Location within Missouri Location within the United States
- Location: MO 24, near Lexington, Missouri
- Coordinates: 39°11′5″N 93°49′29″W
- Area: less than one acre
- Built: 1914
- Built by: Felt, J.H. & Co.
- Architectural style: one-room schoolhouse
- NRHP reference No.: 04000088
- Added to NRHP: February 24, 2004

Hicklin School is a historic one-room school located near Lexington, Lafayette County, Missouri. It was designed by J.H. Felt & Co. and built in 1914. It is a standardized plan, cross-gabled frame building. Also on the property is a contributing two-hole privy. The school closed about 1957.

It was listed on the National Register of Historic Places in 2004.
