= Alexander and Elizabeth Aull Graves House =

Historic house in Missouri, United States

- U.S. National Register of Historic Places
- Location within Missouri Location within the United States
- Location: 2326 Aull Ln., Lexington, Missouri
- Coordinates: 39°10′32″N 93°51′56″W
- Area: less than one acre
- Built: c. 1874
- Architectural style: Italianate
- MPS: Lexington MRA
- NRHP reference No.: 93000552
- Added to NRHP: July 8, 1993

Alexander and Elizabeth Aull Graves House was a historic home located at Lexington, Lafayette County, Missouri. It was built about 1874, and is a two-story, Italianate style brick dwelling. It had a combination hipped and gable roof. It features segmental arched windows and a bracketed bay window. Also on the property was the contributing frame shed. It was the home of Congressman Alexander Graves. It is no longer in existence.

It was listed on the National Register of Historic Places in 1993.
