= George Johnson House (Lexington, Missouri) =

Historic house in Missouri, United States

- U.S. National Register of Historic Places
- Location within Missouri Location within the United States
- Location: 102 S. 30th St., Lexington, Missouri
- Coordinates: 39°11′7″N 93°51′16″W
- Built: c. 1894
- Architect: Cheatham, John E.
- Architectural style: Queen Anne
- MPS: Lexington MRA
- NRHP reference No.: 93000554
- Added to NRHP: July 08, 1993

George Johnson House, also known as White Castle House, is a historic home located at Lexington, Lafayette County, Missouri. It was built about 1894, and is a 2 1/2-story, Queen Anne style frame dwelling. It has a cross-gable plan and features a one-story, wraparound verandah. Also on the property is the contributing two-story building used as a summer kitchen and servant quarters. style

It was listed on the National Register of Historic Places in 1993.
