= Commercial Community Historic District =

Historic district in Missouri, United States

- U.S. National Register of Historic Places
- U.S. Historic district
- Location within Missouri Location within the United States
- Location: Roughly bounded by 8th, 13th, South, Broadway, and Main Sts., Lexington, Missouri
- Coordinates: 39°11′09″N 93°52′52″W
- Area: 42 acres (17 ha)
- Architectural style: Late Victorian, Gothic Revival
- MPS: Lexington MRA
- NRHP reference No.: 83001025
- Added to NRHP: August 4, 1983

Commercial Community Historic District is a national historic district located at Lexington, Lafayette County, Missouri. The district encompasses 106 contributing buildings and 1 contributing structure in the central business district and surrounding residential area of Lexington. It developed between about 1830 and 1930, and includes representative examples of Late Victorian and Gothic Revival style architecture. Located in the district is the separately listed Lafayette County Courthouse. Other notable buildings include the Lexington Racquetball Club (former German Methodist Episcopal Church, c. 1878, 1910), Missouri Public Service Storage Building (former Baehrs Beer Cellar, c. 1871), Franklin Diner (c. 1900), Wright House (c. 1840), Goehner's Marbleworks (c. 1857), First Presbyterian Church (c. 1814, 1890), Municipal Auditorium (1930), Leiter Apartments (c. 1900), Lafayette County Sheriff's Office and Jail (1939), Morrison Wentworth Bank Building (c. 1870), and Winkler Theatre (c. 1925).

It was listed on the National Register of Historic Places in 1983.
