= Thomas Talbot and Rebecca Walton Smithers Stramcke House =

Historic house in Missouri, United States

- U.S. National Register of Historic Places
- Location within Missouri Location within the United States
- Location: 15834 Highway O, Lexington, Missouri
- Coordinates: 39°8′24″N 93°52′57″W
- Area: 2.3 acres (0.93 ha)
- Built: c. 1887
- Architectural style: Queen Anne, Stick/eastlake
- NRHP reference No.: 99001208
- Added to NRHP: September 29, 1999

Thomas Talbot and Rebecca Walton Smithers Stramcke House, also known as The Cedars, is a historic home located at Lexington, Lafayette County, Missouri. It was built about 1887, and is a 2 1/2-story, asymmetrical, Queen Anne style frame dwelling. It features a round three-story tower with a conical roof, a wraparound verandah with Eastlake movement supports and spindlework, and gable ornamentation.

It was listed on the National Register of Historic Places in 1999.
