= House at 1413 Lafayette St. =

Historic house in Missouri, United States

- U.S. National Register of Historic Places
- Location within Missouri Location within the United States
- Location: 1413 Lafayette St., Lexington, Missouri
- Coordinates: 39°11′13″N 93°52′39″W
- Area: less than one acre
- Built: c. 1840
- Architectural style: Greek Revival
- NRHP reference No.: 99000379
- Added to NRHP: March 25, 1999

House at 1413 Lafayette St. is a historic home located at Lexington, Lafayette County, Missouri. It was built about 1840, and is a 1 1/2-story, side passage plan, Greek Revival style brick I-house. It has a one-story rear ell. It features an impressive entry with transom and sidelights, a parapet gable roof, and segmental arched windows on the rear wing.

It was listed on the National Register of Historic Places in 1999.
