= Spratt-Allen-Aull House =

Historic house in Missouri, United States

- U.S. National Register of Historic Places
- Location within Missouri Location within the United States
- Location: 2321 Aull Ln., Lexington, Missouri
- Coordinates: 39°10′30″N 93°51′57″W
- Area: 1.9 acres (0.77 ha)
- Built: c. 1840
- Architectural style: Greek Revival
- MPS: Lexington MRA
- NRHP reference No.: 93000555
- Added to NRHP: July 8, 1993

Spratt-Allen-Aull House is a historic home located at Lexington, Lafayette County, Missouri. It was built about 1840, and is a two-story, Greek Revival style red brick dwelling. It features a colossal pedimented tetrastyle portico with a full-facade upper deck. Also on the property is the contributing octagonal, two-story frame ice house.

It was listed on the National Register of Historic Places in 1993.
