= D. W. B. and Julia Waddell Tevis House =

Historic house in Missouri, United States

- U.S. National Register of Historic Places
- Location within Missouri Location within the United States
- Location: 505 S. 13th St., Lexington, Missouri
- Coordinates: 39°10′43″N 93°52′43″W
- Area: less than one acre
- Built: c. 1868
- Architectural style: Italianate
- MPS: Lexington MRA
- NRHP reference No.: 93000556
- Added to NRHP: July 8, 1993

D. W. B. and Julia Waddell Tevis House is a historic home located at Lexington, Lafayette County, Missouri. It was built around 1868 and is a two-story, cruciform plan, and Italianate style brick dwelling. It features a roofline embellished with hefty modillions (or mini-brackets) and twin Queen Anne porches. Also on the property is the contributing small, frame outbuilding.

It was listed on the National Register of Historic Places in 1993.
