= First Battle of Lexington =

Battle of the American Civil War

Coordinates: 39.1915°N 93.878636°W

Siege of Lexington
- Part of the Trans-Mississippi Theater of the American Civil War
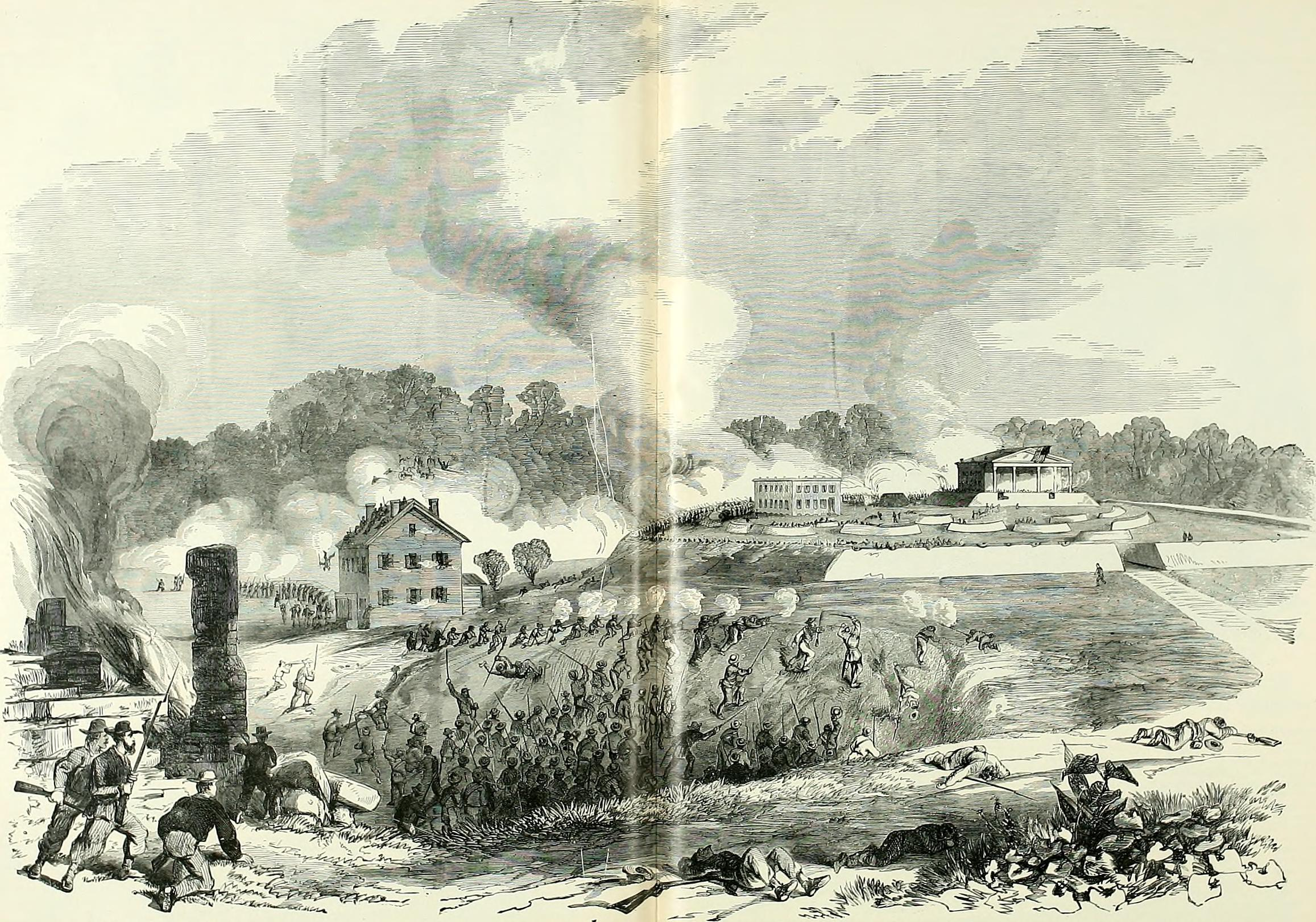
- The Siege of Lexington, Mo. by F. B. Wilkie
Location	Lexington, Missouri
Result	Confederate victory

Belligerents
Missouri (Confederate)	United States

Commanders and leaders
Sterling Price	James Mulligan

Units involved
Missouri State Guard	23rd Illinois Infantry Regiment

Strength
15,000	3,500

Casualties and losses
~150 (30 killed, 120 wounded)	~36 killed, 117 wounded, 8 missing, ~3,000 captured
- Location within Missouri

The siege of Lexington, also known as the first battle of Lexington or the battle of the Hemp Bales, was a minor conflict of the American Civil War. The siege took place from September 13 to 20, 1861, between the Union army and the pro-Confederate Missouri State Guard in Lexington, county seat of Lafayette County, Missouri. The victory won by the Missouri Guard bolstered the considerable Southern sentiment in the area, and briefly consolidated Missouri State Guard control of the Missouri River Valley in the western part of the state.

== Background ==
Prior to the American Civil War, Lexington was an agricultural town of over 4,000 residents that served as the county seat of Lafayette County and enjoyed a position of considerable local importance on the Missouri River in west-central Missouri. Hemp (used for rope production), tobacco, coal and cattle all contributed to the town's wealth, as did the river trade. Though Missouri remained in the Union during the war, many of Lexington's residents were slaveowners, and several openly sympathized with the Southern aim of preserving slavery. Lafayette County had a high ratio of slaves to free persons, with slaves comprising 32% of its population.

Following the Battle of Boonville in June 1861, Federal Brigadier General Nathaniel Lyon ordered the 5th Regiment of the United States Reserve Corps to occupy Lexington. This regiment was composed primarily of Germans from St. Louis, and it had participated in the Camp Jackson Affair. Arriving on the steamer White Cloud on July 9, the Northerners were commanded by Colonel Charles G. Stifel. Stifel's second in command was Lieutenant Colonel Robert White, who became a primary point of contact with the local civilians. Stifel selected the defunct Masonic College in Lexington as his headquarters, and the soldiers began entrenching and fortifying that position.

Stifel's scouts began securing or destroying boats that could be used to cross the river, and also confiscated about 200 kegs of gunpowder, 33 muskets, and two 6-pounder cannons from the area. The cannons were placed under the command of Charles M. Pirner. Several local pro-Union home guard companies were raised and placed under the command of Major Frederick W. Becker.

In mid-August the 90-day enlistments of Stifel's regiment were expiring, and they were ordered to return to St. Louis. White had been organizing a new regiment locally, but he suddenly left for several weeks during which time Major Becker had command of the post. Meanwhile, on the Southern side, self-styled Colonel Henry L. Routt of Clay County had collected around a thousand men for a regiment that he was raising. Routt had led the force that had seized the Liberty Arsenal in April.

Routt now arrested several prominent Union men, including former Missouri governor Austin A. King, then surrounded the Federal outpost at Lexington. He demanded Becker's surrender but this was refused. One night two of Becker's men, Charles and Gustave Pirner, tested some rounds they had fabricated for two mortars that had come into their possession. They lobbed three shells into Routt's encampment with one of the mortars, causing a panic but no real damage. Later, learning of the approach of Colonel Thomas A. Marshall's 1st Illinois cavalry, Routt withdrew from the area. White returned at the end of August and briefly assumed command of the post from Becker until the Illinois cavalry arrived a few days later. White resumed organization of the 14th Home Guard Regiment.

Following their victory at Wilson's Creek on August 10, the main body of the pro-Confederate Missouri State Guard under Major General Sterling Price marched toward the Missouri-Kansas border with around 7,000 men to repel incursions by Lane's pro-Union Kansas Brigade. On September 2, the Guard drove away Lane's Kansans in the Battle of Dry Wood Creek, sending them back beyond Fort Scott. Price then turned north along the border and toward Lexington, intending to break Federal control of the Missouri River and gather recruits from both sides of the river. Price collected recruits as he went along, including Routt and several hundred of his men then at the town of Index in Cass County.

Federal reinforcements arrived in Lexington on September 4: the 13th Missouri Infantry commanded by Colonel Everett Peabody and a battalion of the United States Reserve Corps under Major Robert T. Van Horn. To prevent rebel Governor Claiborne Fox Jackson from obtaining any funds from local banks, General John C. Frémont gave orders to impound their funds. On September 7, Marshall removed approximately $1,000,000 from the Farmers' Bank in Lexington while Peabody was dispatched to Warrensburg to do the same there. On arriving in Warrensburg, Peabody's detachment found itself in Price's path and made a hasty retreat back to Lexington.

Finally, on September 10, Colonel James A. Mulligan arrived to take command with his 23rd Illinois Volunteer Infantry Regiment—known as the "Irish Brigade"—and a detachment of the 27th Missouri Mounted Infantry under Lieutenant Colonel Benjamin W. Grover. On September 11, the 13th Missouri Infantry and Van Horn's battalion returned to Lexington. Mulligan now commanded 3,500 men, and quickly commenced to construct extensive fortifications around the town's Masonic College where it soon developed a fatal shortage of drinking water. Trees were felled to make lines of fire, and earthworks were erected around the dormitory and classroom buildings. His superiors dispatched further reinforcements under Samuel D. Sturgis, with which Mulligan hoped to hold his enlarged position, but they were ambushed by pro-Confederate militia (alerted by a secessionist telegraph tapper) and compelled to retreat.

== Battle ==
=== Opening round ===
Price and his army—now numbering around 15,000 men—arrived before Lexington on September 11, 1861. Skirmishing began the morning of September 12, when two Federal companies posted behind hemp shocks along a hill opposed Price's cavalry advance. Price pulled back several miles to Garrison creek to await his artillery and infantry. With their arrival in the afternoon, he resumed the advance along a more westerly course, eventually intercepting the Independence Road. Mulligan dispatched four companies of the 13th Missouri Infantry (USA) and the two companies of Van Horn's United States Reserve Battalion to oppose this movement. They battled Price's advance elements among the tombstones in Machpelah Cemetery south of town, hoping to buy time for the rest of Mulligan's men to complete their defensive preparations. Price's artillery deployed and together with his growing infantry contingent, dislodged the defenders and forced them back to their fortifications.

Pursuing the fleeing Federals, Price deployed Guibor and Bledsoe's batteries to shell the Federal fortifications at the college. Three Federal artillery pieces replied, destroying one of Guibor's caissons near the end of the exchange. The two-and-a-half hour artillery duel badly diminished the State Guard's ammunition, and much of Price's ordnance supply train had been left at Osceola. This development combined with the redoubtable nature of the Union fortifications to render any further assault impractical. The Federals remained trapped in their fortress, however, surrounded by an army nearly five times their size. Having bottled up his enemy, Price decided to await his own ammunition wagons, other supplies and reinforcements before renewing the assault. "It is unnecessary to kill off the boys here," said he; "patience will give us what we want." Accordingly, he ordered his infantry to fall back to the county fairgrounds.

On September 18, Price had determined the time had come. The State Guard advanced under heavy Union artillery fire, pushing the enemy back into their inner works. Price's cannon responded to Mulligan's with nine hours of bombardment, utilizing heated shot in an attempt to set fire to the Masonic College and other Federal positions. Mulligan stationed a youth in the attic of the college's main building, who was able to remove all incoming rounds before they could set the building ablaze.

=== Anderson house ===
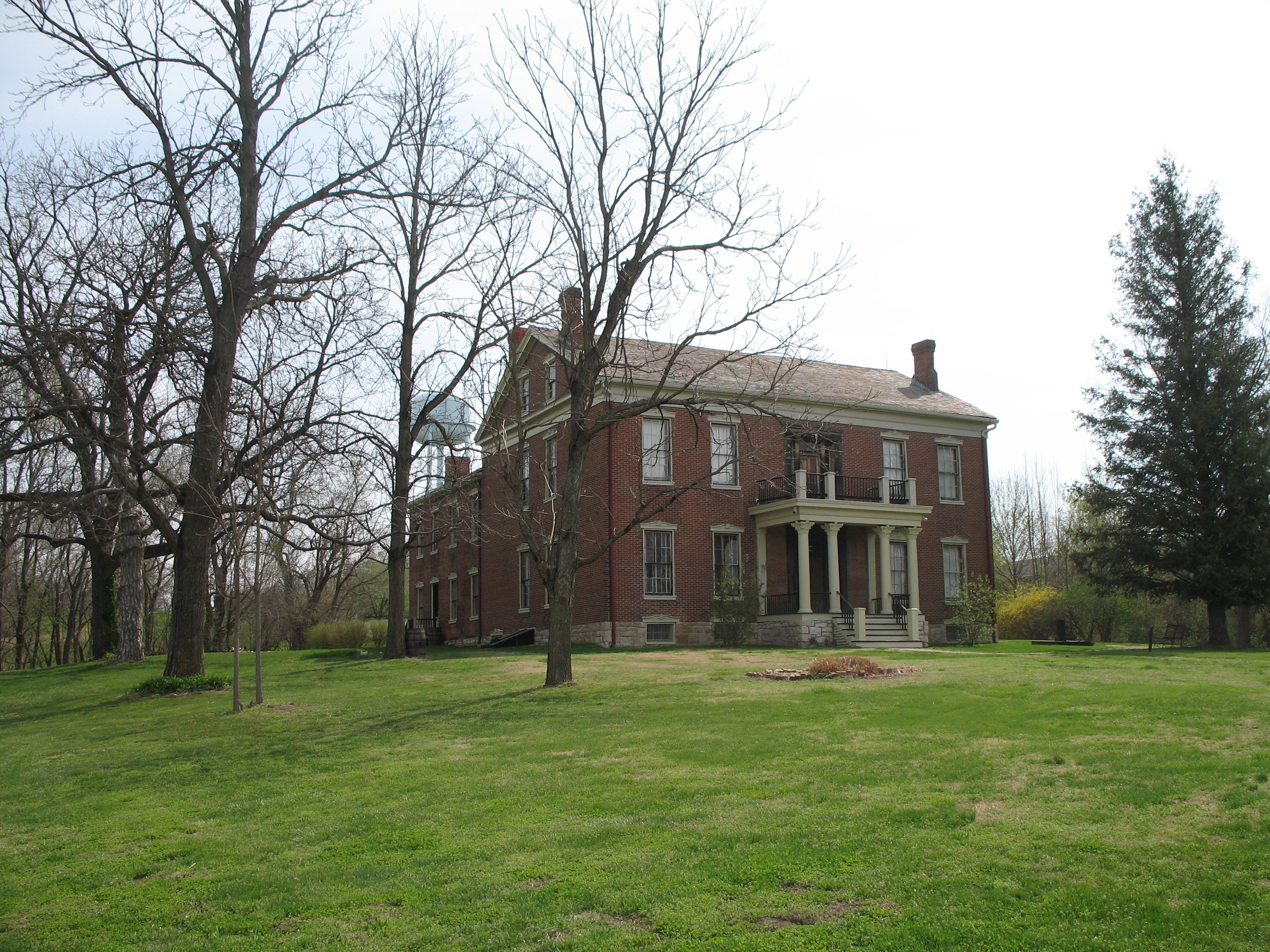
Anderson House — The Union hospital attacked by the Confederates

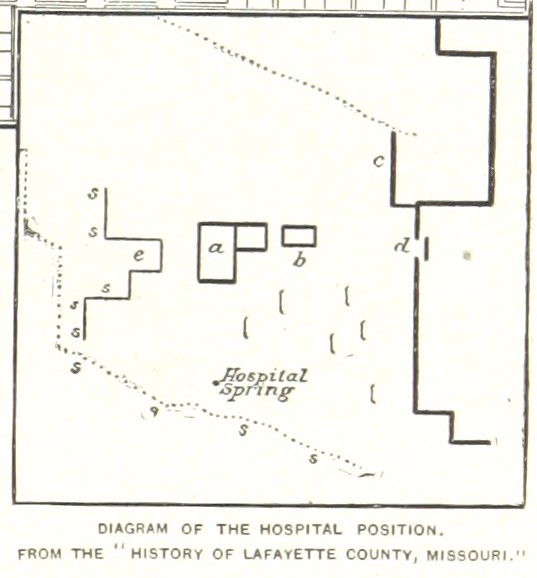
A map of the area around the Anderson House during the battle. a is the Anderson house; b a smaller brick; c a low earthwork, projecting down nearly into the ravine, represented by the dotted line; d the sally-port in the earthworks; e a canal-like carriageway leading up to the house; the brackets represent Federal picket-guard stations with a little dirt thrown up for protection; the dotted line sss shows a deep gorge or ravine which was full of Confederate sharp-shooters.

Once described by a local newspaper as "...the largest and best arranged dwelling house west of St. Louis," the Anderson House was a three-story, Greek Revival style house constructed by Oliver Anderson, a prominent Lexington manufacturer. Sometime around July 1861 the Anderson family was evicted from their home, which lay adjacent to Mulligan's fortifications, and a Union hospital was established there. At the start of the battle over a hundred sick or wounded Union soldiers occupied this structure, with their medical care entrusted to a surgeon named Dr. Cooley, while Father Butler, Chaplain of the 23rd Illinois, provided for their spiritual needs.

Because of its tactical significance—lying as only a few yards from State Guard positions—General Thomas Harris ordered soldiers from his 2nd Division (MSG) to capture the house on September 18. Shocked at what he considered a violation of the Laws of War, Mulligan ordered the structure to be retaken. Company B, 23rd Illinois, Company B, 13th Missouri, and volunteers from the 1st Illinois Cavalry charged from the Union lines and recaptured the house, suffering heavy casualties in the process. Harris's troops recaptured the hospital later that day, and it remained in State Guard hands thereafter.

During the Federal assault on the Anderson house, Union troops summarily executed three State Guard soldiers at the base of the grand staircase in the main hall. The Southerners claimed the men had already surrendered, and should have been treated as prisoners of war. The Federal troops, who had sustained numerous casualties in retaking the residence, considered the prisoners to have been in violation of the Laws of War for having attacked a hospital in the first place. The Anderson home was heavily damaged by cannon and rifle projectiles, with many of the holes still visible both inside and outside the house (which is now a museum) today.

The Anderson House and Lexington Battlefield was listed on the National Register of Historic Places in 1969.

=== Preparing for the final assault ===
On September 19, the State Guard consolidated its positions, kept the Federals under heavy artillery fire, and prepared for their final attack. One problem faced by the defenders was a chronic lack of water; wells within the Union lines had gone dry, and State Guard sharpshooters were able to cover a nearby spring, picking off any man who tried to approach it. Surmising that a woman might succeed where his men had failed, Mulligan sent a female to the spring. Price's troops held their fire, and even permitted her to take a few canteens of water back to the beleaguered Federals. This tiny gesture, however, could not solve the increasing crisis of thirst among the Union garrison, which would contribute to their ultimate undoing.

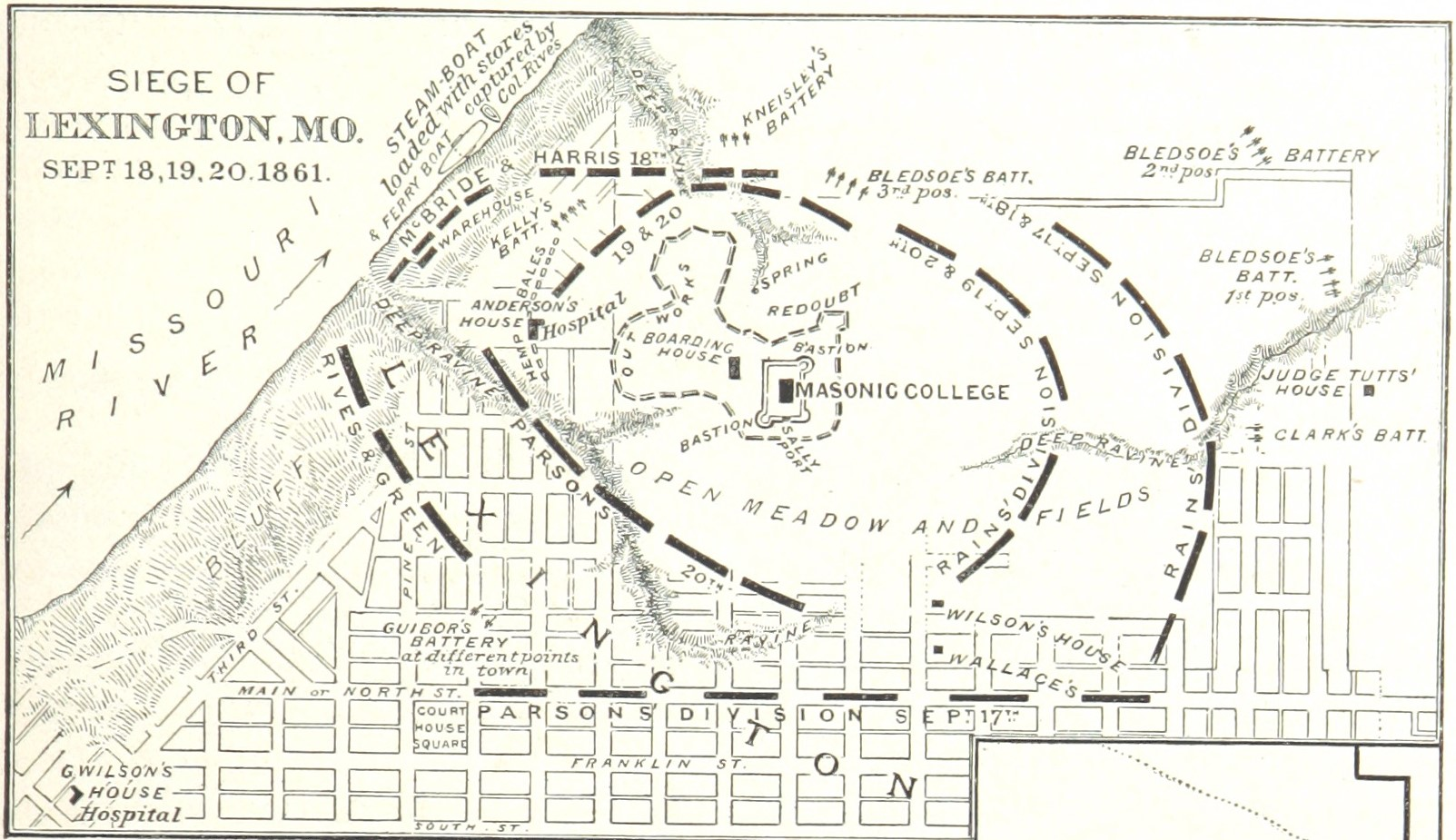
Map of the last three days of battle

General Price had established his headquarters in a bank building at 926 Main Street on September 18, 1861, located across the street from the Lafayette County Courthouse, directing State Guard operations from a room on the second floor. On the 20th a cannonball, probably fired from Captain Hiram Bledsoe's State Guard Battery, struck the courthouse only about one hundred yards from General Price's headquarters. According to accounts dating from 1920, the ball did not originally lodge in the column but fell out and was recovered by a collector. Decades after the battle, the then-elderly gentleman signed an affidavit with his story, then gave the cannonball to County Commissioners. They in turn had the ball screwed onto a two-foot iron rod embedded in the column for the purpose, where it remains visible to tourists today.

On the evening of September 19, soldiers of Brigadier General Thomas A. Harris's 2nd Division (State Guard) began using hemp bales seized from nearby warehouses to construct a moveable breastwork facing the Union entrenchment. These bales were soaked in river water overnight, to render them impervious to any heated rounds fired from the Federal guns. Harris's plan was for his troops to roll the bales up the hill the following day, using them for cover as they advanced close enough to the Union garrison for a final charge. The hemp bale line started in the vicinity of the Anderson house, extending north along the hillside for about 200 yards. In many places the hemp bales were stacked two high to provide additional protection.

=== Deployment of the hemp bales ===
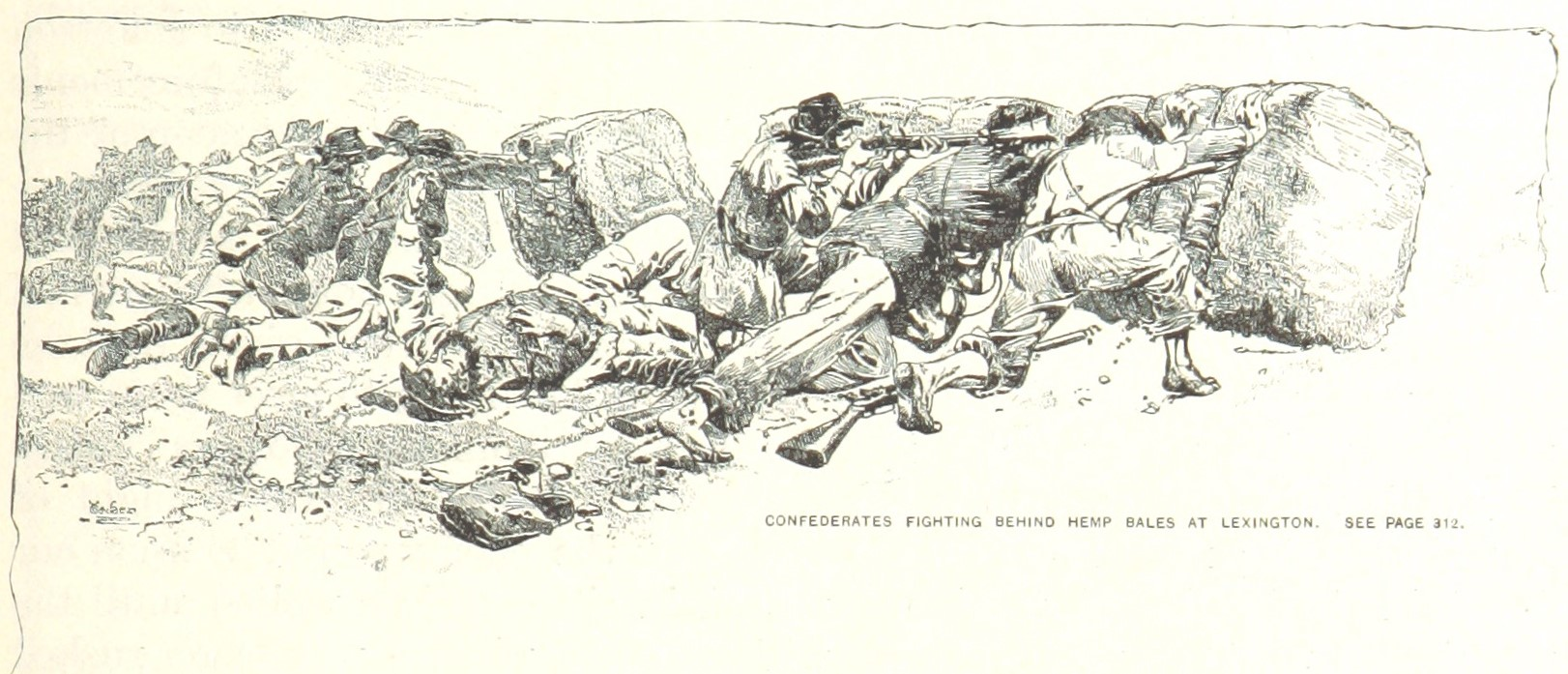
Confederates fighting behind hemp bales

Early on the morning of September 20, Harris's men advanced behind his mobile breastworks. As the fighting progressed, State Guardsmen from other divisions joined Harris's men behind them, increasing the amount of fire directed toward the Union garrison. Although the defenders poured red-hot shot into the advancing bales, their soaking in the Missouri River the previous night had given the hemp the desired immunity to the Federal shells. By early afternoon, the rolling fortification had advanced close enough for the Southerners to take the Union works in a final rush. Mulligan requested surrender terms after noon, and at 2:00 p.m. his men vacated their trenches and stacked their arms.

Many years later, in his book The Rise and Fall of the Confederate Government, Southern president Jefferson Davis opined that "The expedient of the bales of hemp was a brilliant conception, not unlike that which made Tarik, the Saracen warrior, immortal, and gave his name to the northern pillar of Hercules."

== Aftermath ==
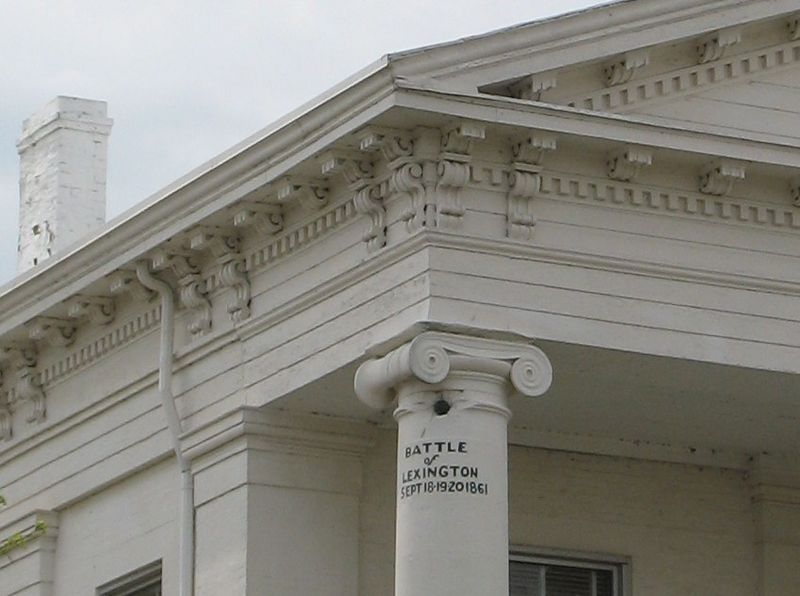
Lafayette Courthouse in Lexington, with cannonball lodged in its pillar

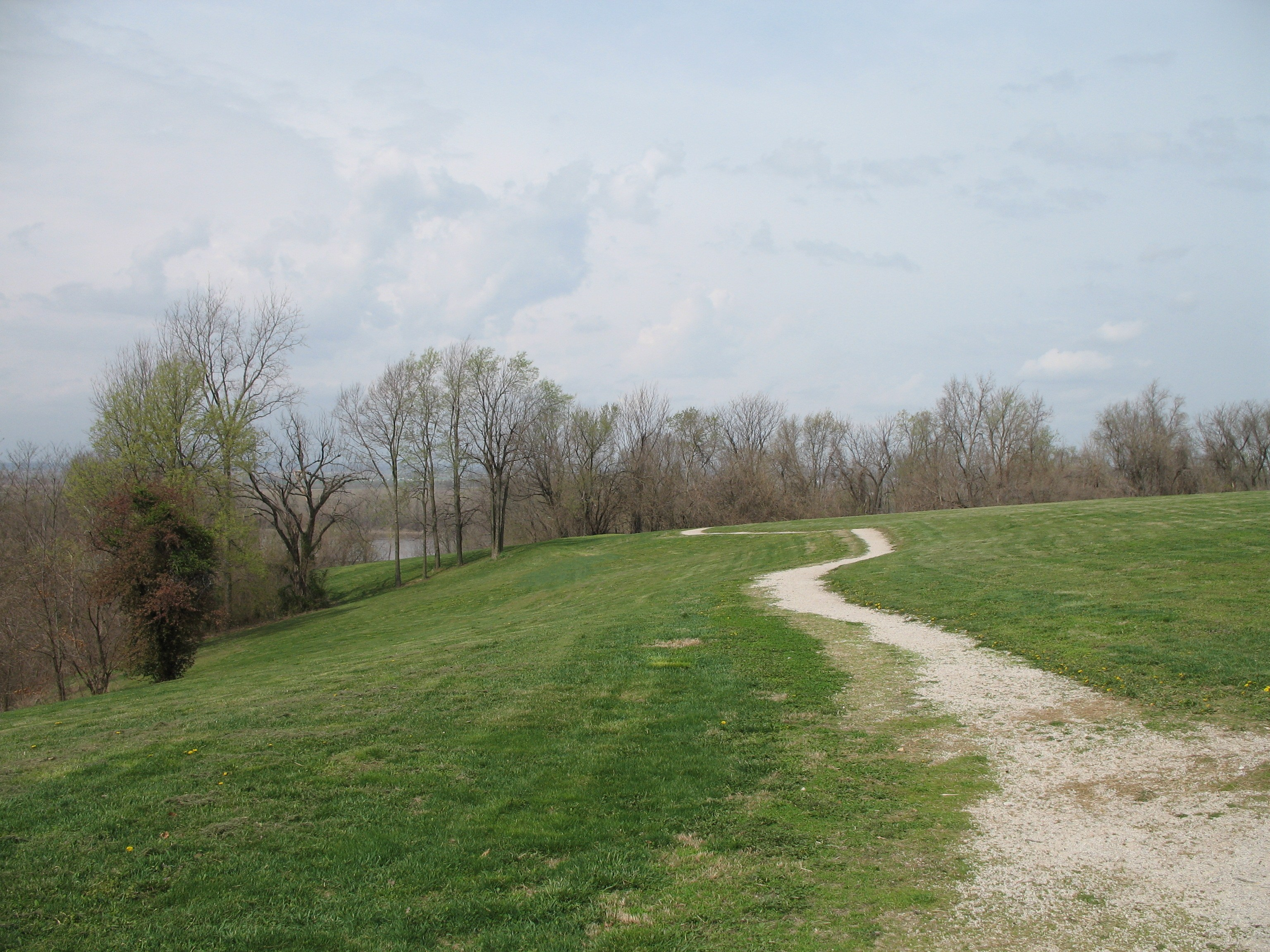
The main battlefield where Confederates climbed the bluffs of the Missouri River pushing hemp bales up the bluff to defeat the Union positions

Casualties at Lexington were relatively low because the battle was largely fought from protective positions. Price claimed a loss of only 25 men killed and 72 wounded in his official report. However, a study of his subordinates' after-action reports reveals a total of at least 30 killed and 120 wounded. This would not include any civilians or recruits who had not yet enrolled but who had joined the fighting. The Federals lost 39 killed and 120 wounded. The relatively light casualties may be attributed to Mulligan's excellent entrenchments and Harris's hemp-bale inspiration; nevertheless, the entire Union garrison was taken prisoner. Among the casualties at the first battle of Lexington was Grover, commanding the 27th Missouri Mounted Infantry, who was wounded by a musket ball in the thigh. He succumbed to his wound October 31, 1861.

The surrendered Union soldiers were compelled to listen to a speech by the deposed pro-Confederate Missouri governor Claiborne F. Jackson, who upbraided them for entering his state without invitation and waging war upon its citizens. The Federals were then paroled by General Price, with the notable exception of Mulligan, who refused parole. Price was reportedly so impressed by the Federal commander's demeanor and conduct during and after the battle that he offered Mulligan his own horse and buggy, and ordered him safely escorted to Union lines. Mulligan was mortally wounded at the Second Battle of Kernstown near Winchester, Virginia on July 24, 1864, while Price would go on to command Confederate forces at numerous battles throughout the Western and Trans-Mississippi theaters.

Following the surrender at Lexington, Fremont and Price negotiated an exchange cartel. The Camp Jackson parolees were exchanged for a portion of Mulligan's command. This worked smoothly for the officers who were specifically named, but not for all of the Federal enlisted men. Some enlisted men were ordered back into Federal service without having been properly exchanged, then moved to different theaters. Several were captured at Shiloh, where they were recognized and executed for violating their parole.

== See also ==
- List of American Civil War battles
