= Thomas Shelby House =

Historic house in Missouri, United States

- U.S. National Register of Historic Places
- Location within Missouri Location within the United States
- Location: 0.25 mi. E of US 24 and MO 111, near Lexington, Missouri
- Coordinates: 39°10′47″N 93°47′9″W
- Area: less than one acre
- Built: 1855
- Architectural style: Greek Revival
- MPS: Antebellum Resources of Johnson, Lafayette, Pettis, and Saline Counties MPS
- NRHP reference No.: 97001429
- Added to NRHP: November 14, 1997

The Thomas Shelby House, also known as Kerr House, is a historic home located near Lexington, Lafayette County, Missouri. It was built circa 1855, and is a two-story, Greek Revival style brick I-house. It has a two-story rear ell with two-story porch. The front facade features an entry portico with tapering octagonal posts and scrollwork balustrade.

It was listed on the National Register of Historic Places in 1997.

The Thomas Shelby House is no longer standing, though a German bank barn, built ca. 1900, associated with the property still stands.

According to the National Register of Historic Places nomination form:

The Shelby House originally fronted on the old Santa Fe Trail, a route paralleled by today's U.S. Highway 24. Nearby are apple orchards, modern apple processing and storage buildings and a circa 1900 German bank barn. The Shelby House is said to be constructed of bricks fired at a kiln east of the property. The brickwork is precise, with bricks laid in a common bond. . . .

The Shelby House is the only extant antebellum building of the Thomas Shelby plantation. Antebellum outbuildings which originally included a brick carriage house and a slave cabin have been razed.

The Shelby House is significant in the area of agriculture as the main living center of the operating family of a documented hemp plantation. Thomas Shelby, who owned many slaves, was a major participant in the local hemp market. In 1860, Shelby harvested more dew-rotted hemp than all but a handful of other Lafayette County growers. While exemplifying the Greek Revival l-House property type favored by many of the transplanted Southerners, the Shelby House also displays architecture of exceptional quality (see MPS cover document, "Antebellum Resources of Johnson, Lafayette, Pettis, and Saline Counties, Missouri: Associated Property Types: Greek Revival l-Houses, Central Passage Subtype"). Builder Shelby was among the wealthier of the slave-owning farmers, and this is reflected in such embellishments as a projecting pedimented gable, cast iron lintels, and massive entablature enframements. . . .

Located in prime hemp country, the Thomas Shelby House housed the slaveowning Shelby family and was the centerpiece of a large plantation where a transplanted Southern culture flourished prior to the Civil War. Shelby harvested 47 tons of dew-rotted hemp in 1860, and his interest in hemp was so great that he continued harvesting immense quantities into the 1870s, when the market was greatly diminished. Shelby was relatively wealthy and his farm already consisted of more than a thousand acres when the Shelby House was constructed in circa 1855. In 1860, the census reported the farm's cash value as $60,000 and listed its size as 1,580 acres, 800 of which were improved. Shelby's "personal estate" was valued at $36,000 in 1860. To operate the plantation, Shelby had an overseer and 41 slaves.

In addition to its domestic function as the family home, the Shelby house undoubtedly served as the nucleus building on the plantation. Here decisions were made about such things as crop plantings, when to take hemp to market, and matters involving the primary labor force. There were other more specialized buildings, such as barns, granaries and slavehouses, but today the house is the only extant building on the old Shelby property which represents antebellum plantation agriculture. While harvesting huge quantities of hemp, Shelby, like his neighbors, also practiced diversified agriculture which was important commercially as well as for self-sufficiency: the family and Shelby's many slaves had to be fed. Income was derived from a variety of agricultural products including livestock, and this diversity made Shelby and the other growers less vulnerable to fluctuations in hemp prices during the 1850s. Production on the Shelby plantation increased in most categories during the 1850-60 decade. Shelby also may have speculated in land. . . .

Shelby was a successful agriculturalist on Dover Road prior to construction of the Shelby House, continuing and expanding the farming operation established by his parents. His 1850 farm was valued at $4,400, and was of sufficient size (440 acres, 100 of which were improved) for the production of 12 tons of hemp, 2,000 bushels of corn, 200 bushels of oats, 200 pounds of butter, 40 bushels of wheat as well as other produce, while he also raised livestock including 8 cows, 20 beef cattle and 100 swine. In 1850, Shelby had 15 slaves. 7 Forty-seven tons of hemp were produced on the Shelby plantation-which by then had grown much larger--in the year ending June 1, 1860. This amount was exceeded by only two other "growers within Lexington Township, a choice hemp growing area. (While 47 tons was a considerable amount from an individual plantation, it represented only about one per cent of the 4,605 tons of hemp produced in Lafayette County.) In 1860 Shelby's plantation also produced 7,500 bushels of corn, 700 bushels of wheat, 300 bushels of oats, 200 bushels of potatoes, 40 tons of hay, and 400 pounds of butter. He had 42 beef cattje, 10 cows, 200 swine, 30 horses, 18 asses and mules, 8 oxen and 4 sheep. Shelby's few sheep producecf an insignificant amount of wool in 1860, down from the previous decade when a dozen sheep produced 50 pounds. After the war, the flock was greatly expanded. . . .

Settlers from the Upland South, aspiring to develop their ideas of status and the good life on-the Missouri frontier while practicing a plantation lifestyle, built hundreds of Greek Revival l-Houses but relatively few were as impressive as the Shelby House, which remains an outstanding local example of architectural quality in a Greek Revival country house. Born in Marion County, Kentucky, in 1818, Thomas Shelby came to Lafayette County with his parents, William and Nancy Shelby, who were Virginia natives, in 1836. They settled along Dover Road on land purchased from the James Hicklin family. In 1838, Shelby married Nancy H. Gordon, whose father George H. Gordon was an early settler/surveyor who laid out the town of Lexington, and whose uncle was Lin Boyd, a Congressman for 16 years and a former Speaker of the House. Shelby's own relatives included a former Kentucky governor. Shelby's plantation was in operation prior to construction of the Shelby House in circa 1855, but no descriptive record exists of earlier family residences. In 1860, the Shelby household consisted of the parents, seven children and J. Enoch, an overseer of the farm including the family's 41 slaves. Perhaps Shelby sympathized with the Confederacy, but in any case he was considered neutral during the war. According to one biographical (or possibly autobiographical) account, Shelby could "estimate the claims and mistakes of both the contending parties. Without being offensive to either.....he commanded (confidence and esteem) alike from blue coats and gray..." Although the loss of his slaves deprived him of considerable wealth, Shelby kept his plantation and had sufficient assets to continue his agricultural pursuits during the years of reconstruction.

Shelby was reluctant to abandon hemp even in the depressed postwar market, harvesting 20 tons (a substantial amount even a decade earlier) in the year ending June 30,1870. His plantation was smaller at 1,000 acres but the amount of improved land was the same as in 1860, 800 acres. Valuation was $30,000. In addition to hemp, produce in 1870 included 4,000 bushels of corn, 900 bushels of wheat, 20 bushels of potatoes, 100 pounds of wool, 500 pounds of butter and 100 tons of hay. Shelby's orchard produced $100 worth of fruit. He had more cows (30), beef cattle (60) and sheep (30) than in the antebellum censuses, while maintaining the same number of swine (200). There were fewer horses (16), asses and mules (16) and working oxen (2). Livestock were valued at $4,500." At some point, Shelby reportedly purchased 1,500 sheep. He also is said to have experimented with buffalo. After the death of his first wife in 1876, Shelby went to Ohio where he married Margaret Houston. They returned to the Lexington area and probably to the farm in about 1880, then moved to Lexington in 1883. Shelby died in 1907. The Shelby House remained in the family until 1917.
