= Hicklin Hearthstone =

Historic house in Missouri, United States

- U.S. National Register of Historic Places
- Location within Missouri Location within the United States
- Location: E of Lexington on US 24, Lexington, Missouri
- Coordinates: 39°11′10″N 93°49′44″W
- Area: 6.9 acres (2.8 ha)
- Built: 1838
- Architectural style: Greek Revival
- NRHP reference No.: 82000585
- Added to NRHP: December 28, 1982

Hicklin Hearthstone is a historic home located near Lexington, Lafayette County, Missouri. It was built about 1838, and is a two-story, central passage plan, Greek Revival style brick I-house. It has a two-story rear ell and features a one-bay wide two-story pedimented portico. Also on the property are the contributing five-unit dependencies, a two-cell Overseer's cabin (the black overseer was named Levasy), a chicken coop, a smoke house, and a carriage house. The large transverse barn, situated in front of the house, a brick root cellar house, and an outhouse no longer exist. The brick dependencies include a Store House, a Carpenter's quarters, a Wash House, a Servant's quarters and a large summer kitchen. The frame slave quarters housed the field hands. These quarters were numerous and scattered on the property and no longer exist.

James Hicklin, one of Lexington's earliest settlers (his uncle was Gilead Rupe), was a surveyor of roads and plats, settling Lexington with his parents in 1819. He was a skilled farmer as well a skilled entrepreneur. Per the NRHP, there is strong evidence that he amassed his fortune through slave trading, the index of that is the decline of his fortune post the Civil War. Per Ancestry and the 1850 and 1860 Slave Schedules, Hicklin owned 33 slaves in 1850 and 19 slaves in 1860, their ages ranging from 1-50. Several of the enslaved workers stayed after they were freed in January, 1865, and took the name Hicklin as their own. This was not the case for all of the people enslaved by James Hicklin. Per NRHP, one of his workers was branded a fugitive, while another fractured Hicklin's skull in 1853, which would imply reason to doubt any supposed charity or benevolent nature of James Hicklin (slave owner). He died in 1875.

Per a 1912 article written at the time of Young Hicklin's death, the family hired a carpenter from Virginia who lived on the property for three years. Construction of the home began in 1836, and the home was completed five years later, in 1841. The Hicklin home is a well-preserved combination of stylistic influences – the Greek Revival style and traditional vernacular form, an antebellum Southern plantation home. The house was one of many elegant mansions that were to be built along the Dover Road during the 1830s – 1850s, as hemp plantations were established to meet the growing need for rope. Not only was this house one of the earliest, but also one of the finest. To this day, it remains one of the most interesting and impressive antebellum country houses in Western Missouri, as well as suspected breeding plantation. One of the most striking features of the original portico were two great porch pillars, one of solid walnut and one of a white oak. They were cut from two great trees and smoothed with drawn knife and broad-axe.

Hicklin Hearthstone is a very traditional southern type; two full stories tall, its high-ceilinged rooms divided are by a Georgian central hallway. The primary façade of the Hicklin home is dominated by a one-bay wide, two-story portico with doors surrounded by sidelights and a rectangular transom. At the eave line is an elaborate carved Doric frieze, identical to that on Thomas Jefferson's Monticello. There are only four large rooms in the home, a west and an east parlor and two bedrooms. The stairwell in the hall has an intricately scrolled banister. The wide panel doors of walnut feature the original locks with 5” long keys and small brass doorknobs. The floors in many of the rooms are the original wide planks of heart pine. The built-in hat and gun racks in the downstairs hall and west parlor are unique. Upstairs in the girl's room, four hand wrought hooks are in the ceiling; from these, a quilting frame would be suspended for quilting.

Each room has an ornate mantel of a different style. On the side of each mantel are floor to ceiling linen presses, where linens would be folded and pressed by the heat of the wood burning fireplaces. Interior walls measure 10” thick and exterior walls measure 13” thick. Ceilings are twelve feet high and follow the style of the Old South. The windows on the house were originally nine over six pane windows. Although it has an impressive façade, the house was relatively modest, originally having only four rooms and a detached two-story summer kitchen. The cook and her partner lived above the kitchen in a private room. When built, the kitchen was separated from the main house by a breezeway, through which carriages and wagons would pass. When the breezeway was enclosed in the early 1900s, it created a dining room on the first floor and a bedroom on the second floor.

Per the State of Missouri, the architectural naivety evident in Hicklin Hearthstone is a typical expression of the transplantation of culture into a frontier environment and its appearance is an important benchmark of the development of agriculture and society in western Missouri. The Hearthstone is not only unusual for its excellent state of preservation, but also for the collection of out buildings that still reside on the property. One of the According to the State of Missouri, who assisted the family list the home on the National Register of Historic Places in 1982, this collection of outbuildings are by far the most extensive such structures currently in existence in the state of Missouri.

The family burial plot lies to the west of the house in fields under cultivation, the centerpiece a domed limestone mausoleum; its limestone was hauled from Warrensburg. James and his third wife were buried there, and his other wives, their children and slaves (unmarked) were buried in the ground surrounding the mausoleum. Another dramatic structure, the Hicklin School, is a few hundred yards to the east of the house. Two generations of Hicklin children attended school there. Unfortunately, the large transverse barn, which was older than the house, no longer exists; it was sited in full view of the house north of US 24. The root cellar, previously located in front of the house near the well, was dismantled in the 1980s. A two-hole privy/outhouse was situated beside the meat house and also no longer exists.

Alma Davis Hicklin, who named the home "Hicklin Hearthstone" in the 1930s, worked diligently to preserve the home during her husband John's prolonged battle with Parkinson's, and after his untimely death in 1951. She said that during the years of the Great Depression, it was doubtful whether or not they could keep the home. The family made it through because, as she said, “where there is a will, there is a way.” She lived in the home for over seventy years. In the early 1990s, her son, John Jr. and his wife renovated the house, including the addition of a brick two bay garage, removal of the private stairwell in the west parlor, renovation of the sun porch, installation of central heat and air, tuckpointing of the exterior brick, a new roof, and boxed two story columns. Two small bathrooms were added upstairs and the well house in front of the home was rebuilt. In 2018 to present, a member of the fifth generation has restored the dependencies and the carriage house; work continues.
