= Old Neighborhoods Historic District =

Historic district in Missouri, United States

- U.S. National Register of Historic Places
- U.S. Historic district
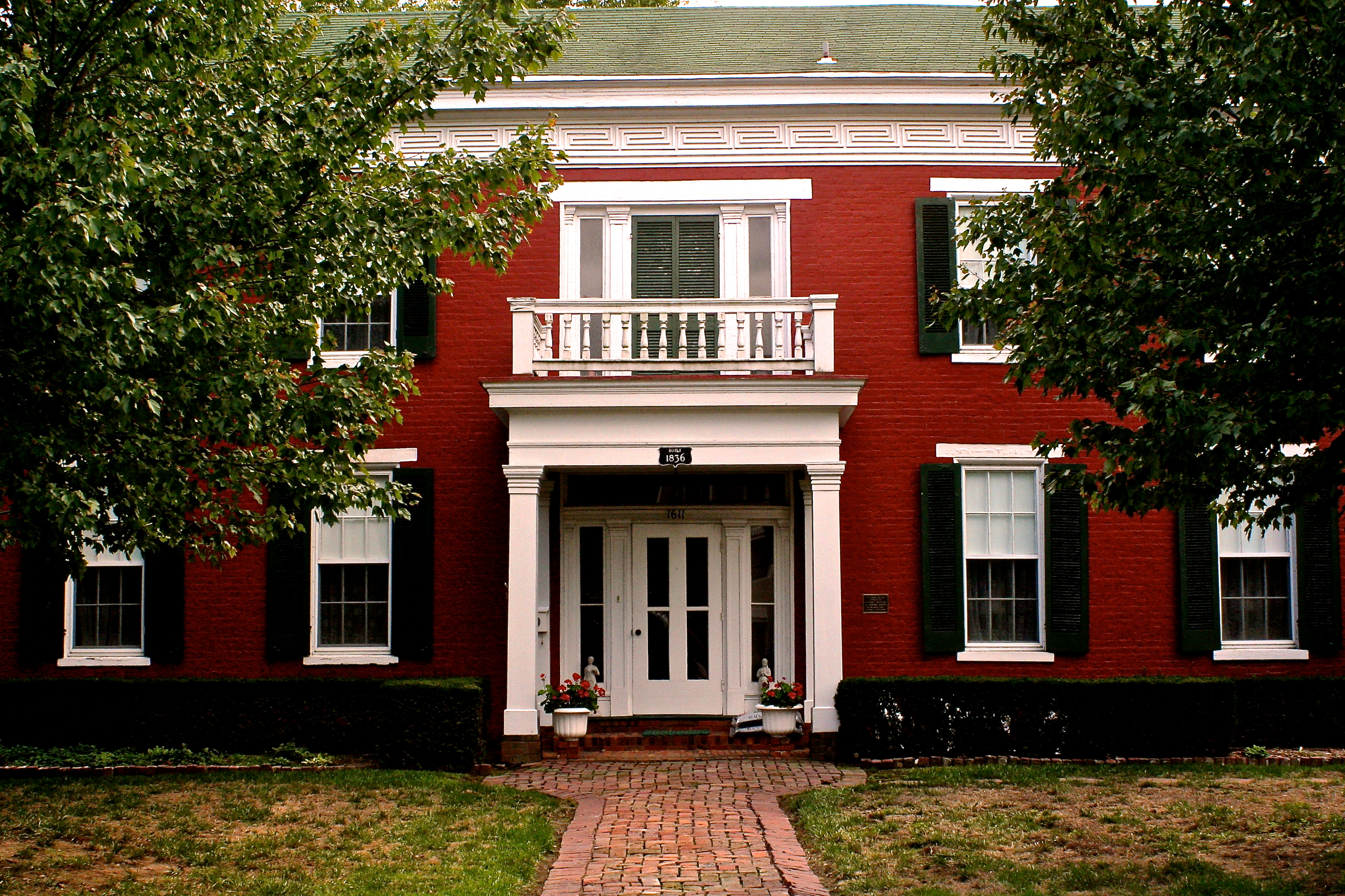
- Worthington (Shea) Manor, September 2012

- Location within Missouri Location within the United States
- Location: Roughly bounded by 13th, 22nd, South Sts., Forest and Washington Aves., Lexington, Missouri
- Coordinates: 39°11′08″N 93°52′28″W
- Area: 97 acres (39 ha)
- Architect: Multiple
- Architectural style: Late 19th And 20th Century Revivals, Mid 19th Century Revival, Late Victorian
- MPS: Lexington MRA
- NRHP reference No.: 83001028
- Added to NRHP: August 4, 1983

Old Neighborhoods Historic District is a national historic district located at Lexington, Lafayette County, Missouri. The district encompasses 267 contributing buildings in a predominantly residential section of Lexington. It developed between about 1830 and 1930, and includes representative examples of Late Victorian and Greek Revival style architecture. Located in the district are the separately listed Cumberland Presbyterian Church and Waddell House. Other notable contributing resources include the McGrew House (c. 1890), Schacklett House (c. 1888), Waddell-Pomercy House (c. 1836), Waddell-Young House (c. 1840), First Christian Church (c. 1870), Walter B. Waddell House (c. 1905), Eggleston House (c. 1880), Lafayette Arms (c. 1840), United Methodist Church (c. 1865), Reorganized Church of Jesus Christ of Latter Day Saints (c. 1925), Marquis W. Withers House (c. 1870), John Eggleston House (c. 1840), Christ Church Episcopal (c. 1848), Trinity United Church of Christ (c. 1923), Old German Catholic Church (c. 1882), and Lexington Middle School (c. 1926).

It was listed on the National Register of Historic Places in 1983.
