= William P. Robinson House =

Historic house in Missouri, United States

- U.S. National Register of Historic Places
- Location within Missouri Location within the United States
- Location: 0.2 mi. E and 0.15 mi. S of jct. of MO 107 and MO 112, near Lexington, Missouri
- Coordinates: 39°9′41″N 93°50′24″W
- Area: less than one acre
- Built: 1850
- Architectural style: Greek Revival
- MPS: Antebellum Resources of Johnson, Lafayette, Pettis, and Saline Counties MPS
- NRHP reference No.: 97001428
- Added to NRHP: November 14, 1997

William P. Robinson House is a historic home located near Lexington, Lafayette County, Missouri. It was built about 1850, and is a two-story, central passage plan, Greek Revival style brick I-house. It has a two-story rear ell with an enclosed two-story porch.

It was listed on the National Register of Historic Places in 1997.
