= David John House =

Historic house in Missouri, United States

- U.S. National Register of Historic Places
- Location within Missouri Location within the United States
- Location: 103 S. 23rd St., Lexington, Missouri
- Coordinates: 39°11′6″N 93°51′23″W
- Area: less than one acre
- Built: c. 1848
- Architectural style: Greek Revival
- MPS: Lexington MRA
- NRHP reference No.: 93000553
- Added to NRHP: July 8, 1993

David John House was a historic home located at Lexington, Lafayette County, Missouri. It was built about 1848, and is a one-story, double-pen plan red brick dwelling with Greek Revival style detailing. It had historic frame additions and featured two frame porches with distinctive cut-out posts and scrollwork railings added in the 1870s-1880s. Also on the property was the contributing privy. It is no longer in existence.

It was listed on the National Register of Historic Places in 1993.
