= Lafayette County Courthouse (Missouri) =

- U.S. National Register of Historic Places
- U.S. Historic district – Contributing property
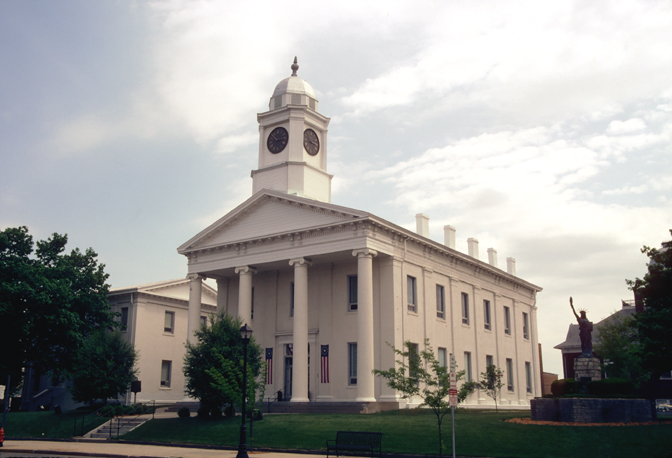
- Lafayette County Courthouse

- Location within Missouri Location within the United States
- Location: Public Square, Lexington, Missouri
- Coordinates: 39°11′6″N 93°52′49″W
- Area: 9.9 acres (4.0 ha)
- Built: 1847
- Architect: Daugherty, William
- Architectural style: Classical Revival
- NRHP reference No.: 70000339
- Added to NRHP: September 22, 1970

The Lafayette County Courthouse is a historic courthouse in Lexington, Lafayette County, Missouri. It was built in 1847 and is the oldest courthouse in continuous use west of the Mississippi River. It is well known for the cannonball embedded in the upper left column, a remnant of the Civil War.

== History ==
In 1847, County Judges Thomas Gordon, Nathaniel Price, and Joseph W. Hall determined that a new Courthouse was needed to serve Lafayette County, Missouri. The judges chose a site on the new Main Street in Lexington, an approved plans for a magnificent structure of the Classic Greek Revival design. Silas Silver, John Catron, Robert Aull, and Henderson Young served as project and contract overseers, and William Dougherty was the architect. On April 1, 1847, the plans were accepted and $12,000 was set aside for building the new structure. The final construction costs were $14,382.46. The old courthouse in "Old Town" Lexington was sold for $1,500 and the old jail was sold for $51.00. This left the total expenditure for the new building at $12,831.46.

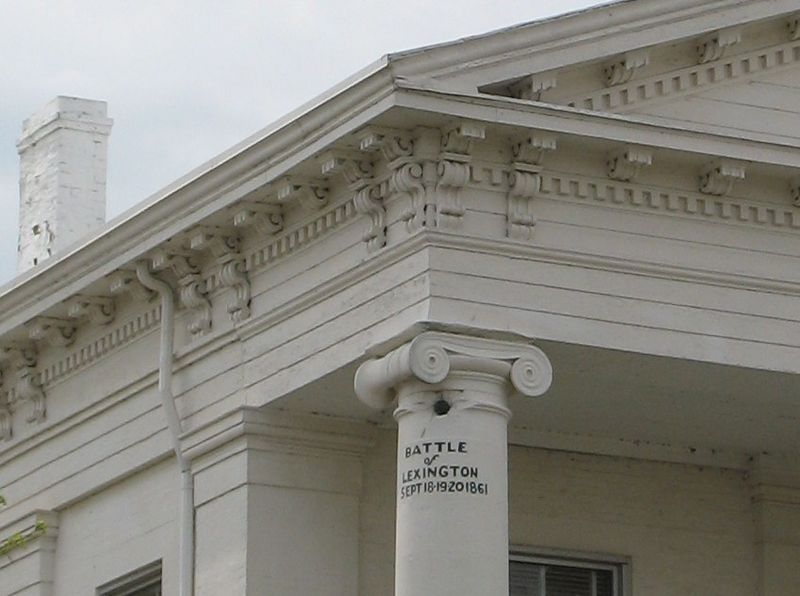
Cannonball from the 1861 Battle of Lexington lodged in the upper left column of the Courthouse

There is a cannonball embedded in the upper left column, a remnant of the Civil War Battle of Lexington I, fought on September 18, 19 and 20, 1861.

The Courthouse was listed on the National Register of Historic Places in 1970. It is in the Commercial Community Historic District.
