= Waddell House (Lexington, Missouri) =

Historic house in Missouri, United States

- U.S. National Register of Historic Places
- U.S. Historic district – Contributing property
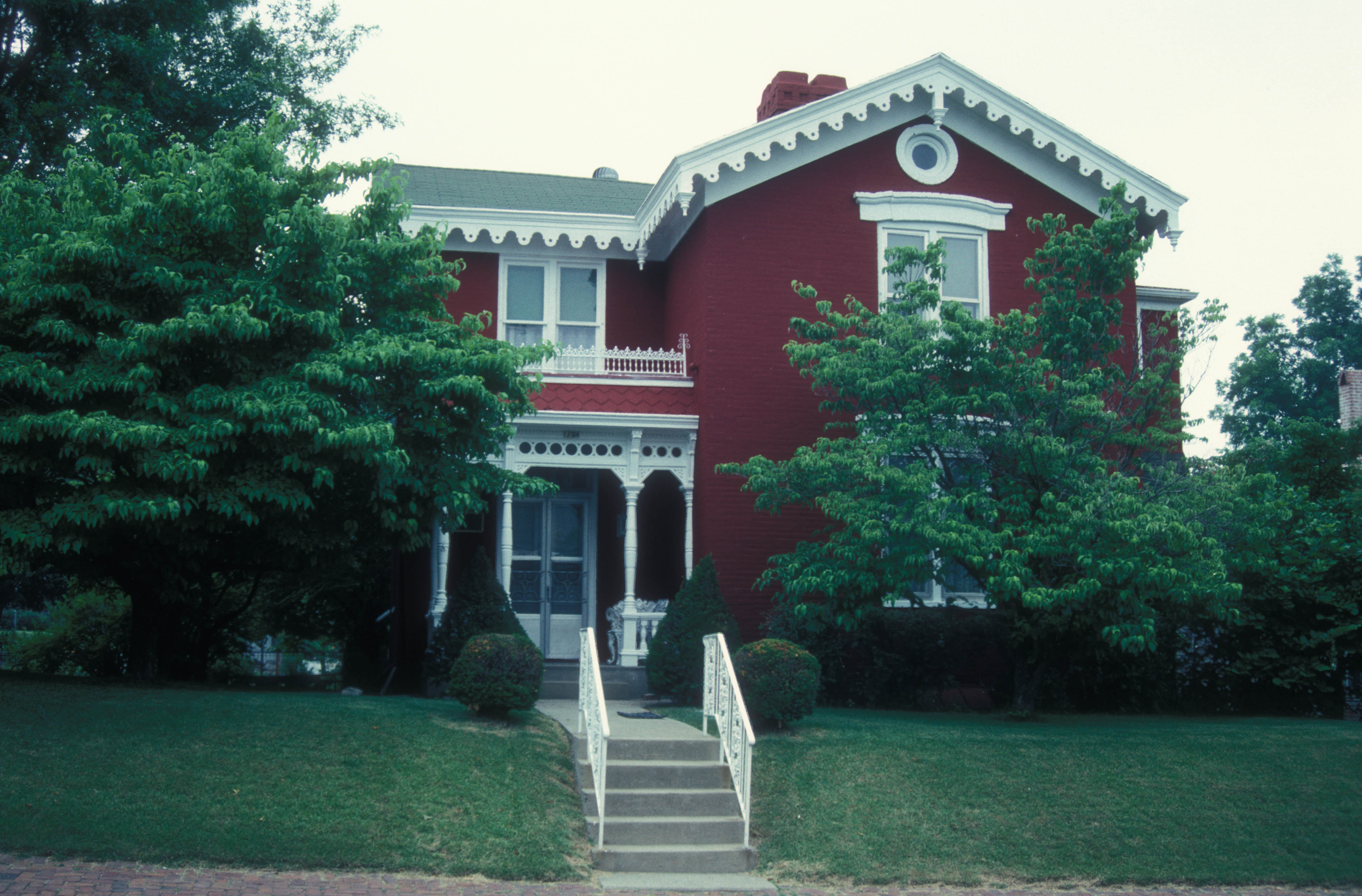
- Waddell House, January 2007

- Location within Missouri Location within the United States
- Location: 1704 South St., Lexington, Missouri
- Coordinates: 39°11′2″N 93°52′29″W
- Area: less than one acre
- Built: 1840
- Architectural style: Late Victorian
- NRHP reference No.: 79001378
- Added to NRHP: October 11, 1979

Waddell House, also known as Pastorium of the First Baptist Church or Van Amburg House, is a historic home located at Lexington, Lafayette County, Missouri. It was built about 1840, and is a two-story, red brick dwelling on a partial basement. It features decorative elements such as clustered chimney pots, scalloped vergeboards with pendants, and a spindled stickwork Late Victorian porch with mansard roof. William Bradford Waddell acquired the house in trade for stock in the local Baptist Female College in 1869.

It was listed on the National Register of Historic Places in 1979. It is located in the Old Neighborhoods Historic District.
