= Theodore Gosewisch House =

Historic house in Missouri, United States

- Theodore Gosewisch / Fuenfhausen House
- U.S. National Register of Historic Places
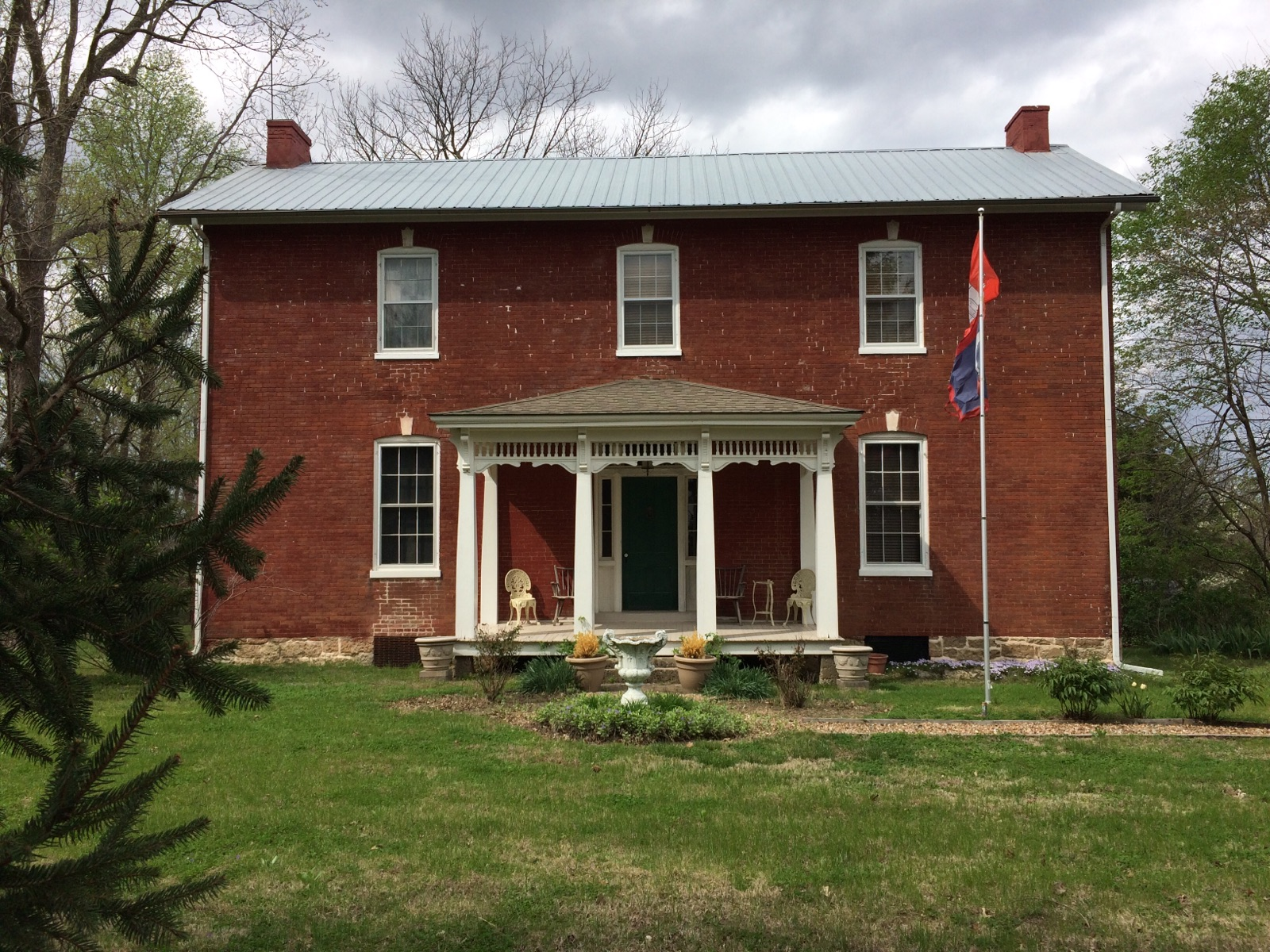

- Location within Missouri Location within the United States
- Location: 0.5 mi. W of jct. of MO 13 and Marshall School Rd., near Lexington, Missouri
- Coordinates: 39°9′28″N 93°53′30″W
- Area: 8 acres (3.2 ha)
- Built: 1847
- Architectural style: Greek Revival
- MPS: Antebellum Resources of Johnson, Lafayette, Pettis, and Saline Counties MPS
- NRHP reference No.: 97001433
- Added to NRHP: November 14, 1997

Theodore Gosewisch House, also known as Fuenfhausen Residence, is a historic home located near Lexington, Lafayette County, Missouri. It was built about 1847, and is a two-story, central passage plan, Greek Revival style brick I-house. It has a two-story rear ell with open shed-roofed porch. The front facade features a one-story Victorian front porch installed in the early 1900s.

It was listed on the National Register of Historic Places in 1997.
