= Minatree Catron House =

Historic house in Missouri, United States

- U.S. National Register of Historic Places
- Location within Missouri Location within the United States
- Location: 0.1 mi W of jct. of US 24 and MO 110, near Lexington, Missouri
- Coordinates: 39°10′49″N 93°47′55″W
- Area: less than one acre
- Built: c. 1843
- Built by: Catron, Christopher, Jr.; Catron, Minatree
- Architectural style: Greek Revival
- MPS: Antebellum Resources of Johnson, Lafayette, Pettis, and Saline Counties MPS
- NRHP reference No.: 97001432
- Added to NRHP: November 14, 1997

Minatree Catron House, also known as Minatree Acres, is a historic home located near Lexington, Lafayette County, Missouri. It was built about 1843, and is a two-story, central passage plan, Greek Revival style brick I-house. It has a one-story rear ell. The front facade features a two-story pedimented portico supported by square brick columns.

It was listed on the National Register of Historic Places in 1997.
