= John E. Cheatham House =

Historic house in Missouri, United States

- U.S. National Register of Historic Places
- Location within Missouri Location within the United States
- Location: 739 MO 13, Lexington, Missouri
- Coordinates: 39°10′21″N 93°52′45″W
- Area: less than one acre
- Built: c. 1868, c. 1880
- Built by: Cheatham, John E.
- Architectural style: Italianate
- MPS: Lexington MRA
- NRHP reference No.: 93000550
- Added to NRHP: July 8, 1993

John E. Cheatham House is a historic home located at Lexington, Lafayette County, Missouri. It was built about 1868, and is a two-story, Italianate style brick dwelling. It has a low-pitched, metal-covered hipped roof with a bracketed cornice. A one-story kitchen addition was constructed about 1880. Also on the property is the contributing brick root cellar.

It was listed on the National Register of Historic Places in 1993.
