= Highland Avenue Historic District (Lexington, Missouri) =

Historic district in Missouri, United States

- U.S. National Register of Historic Places
- U.S. Historic district
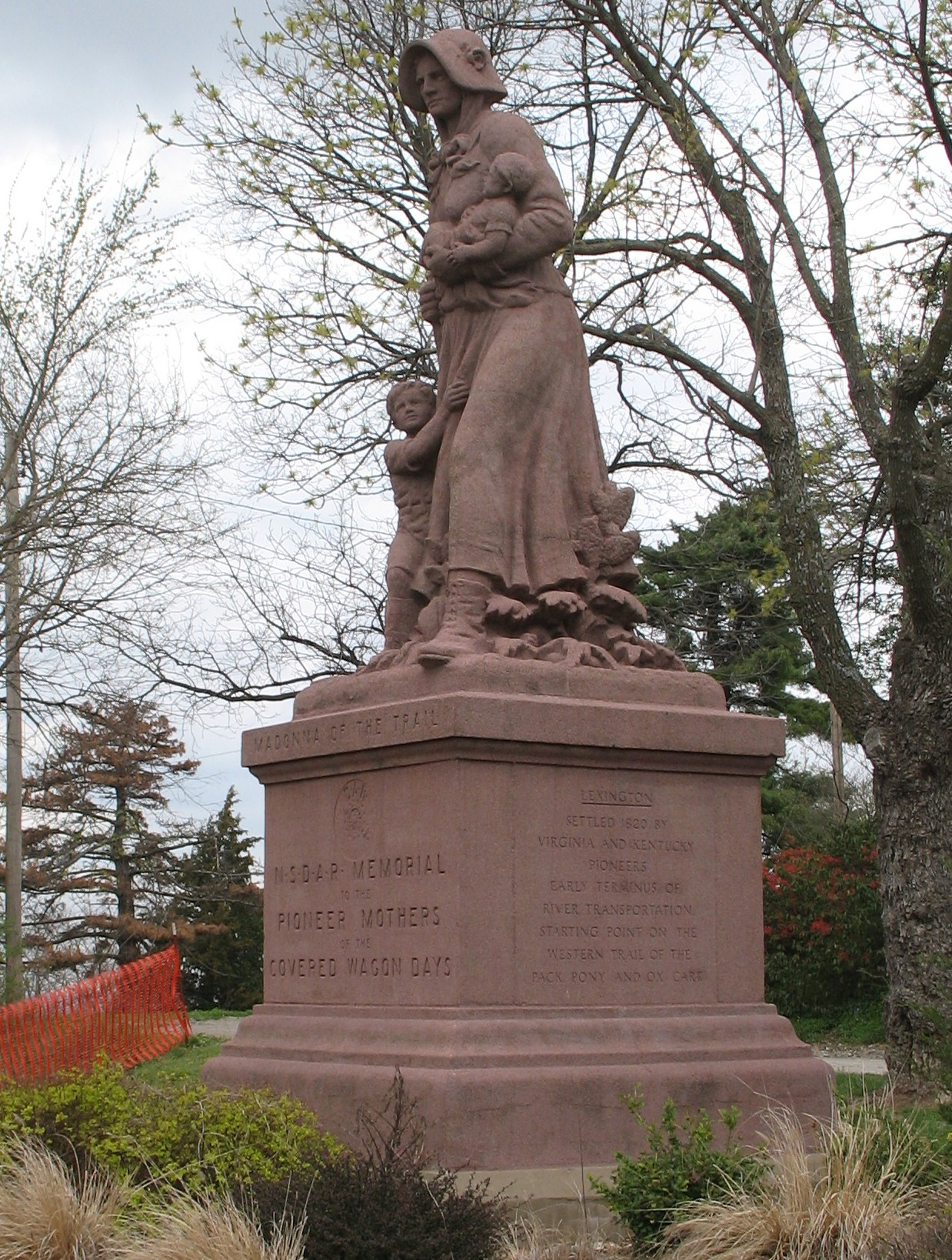
- Madonna of the Trail monument, April 2007

- Location within Missouri Location within the United States
- Location: Roughly bounded by Highland Ave. from Rock to Bluff Sts., Lexington, Missouri
- Coordinates: 39°11′04″N 93°52′30″W
- Area: 28 acres (11 ha)
- Architectural style: Mid 19th Century Revival, Late Victorian
- MPS: Lexington MRA
- NRHP reference No.: 83001026
- Added to NRHP: August 4, 1983

Highland Avenue Historic District is a national historic district located at Lexington, Lafayette County, Missouri. The district encompasses 64 contributing buildings, 6 contributing structures, and 2 contributing objects in a predominantly residential section of Lexington. It developed between about 1830 and 1930, and includes representative examples of Late Victorian and Greek Revival style architecture. Notable contributing resources include the William H. Russell House (c. 1845), William H. Russell House (c. 1840), Frick House (c. 1840), Arnold House (c. 1848), Madonna of the Trail Monument (1928), Hinesley House (c. 1840), O'Malley-Kelly House (c. 1850), and Old Winkler House (c. 1855).

It was listed on the National Register of Historic Places in 1983. The Missouri statue for the Madonna of the Trail is located there.
