= Lexington, Missouri =

City in Missouri, U.S.

- City
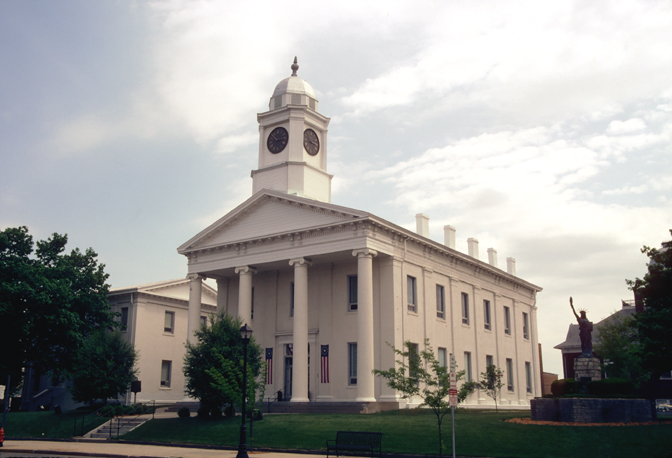
- The Lafayette County Courthouse in Lexington, June 2000

- Location of Lexington, Missouri
- Coordinates: 39°11′04″N 93°52′20″W
- Country: United States
- State: Missouri
- County: Lafayette
- Incorporated: 1845

Government
  - Mayor: Tom Hughes

Area
  - Total: 5.46 sq mi (14.13 km^{2})
  - Land: 5.23 sq mi (13.54 km^{2})
  - Water: 0.23 sq mi (0.59 km^{2})
- Elevation: 810 ft (250 m)

Population (2020)
  - Total: 4,652
  - Density: 889.8/sq mi (343.54/km^{2})
- Time zone: UTC-6 (Central (CST))
  - Summer (DST): UTC-5 (CDT)
- ZIP code: 64067
- Area code: 660
- FIPS code: 29-41870
- GNIS feature ID: 2395697
- Website: lexingtonmo.gov

Lexington is a city in and the county seat of Lafayette County, Missouri, United States. As of the 2020 census, Lexington had a population of 4,652. Lexington is in western Missouri, within the Kansas City metropolitan area, approximately 40 miles (64 km) east of Kansas City. It is the home of the Battle of Lexington State Historic Site, and of the former Wentworth Military Academy and College, which operated from 1880 to 2017.

== Geography ==
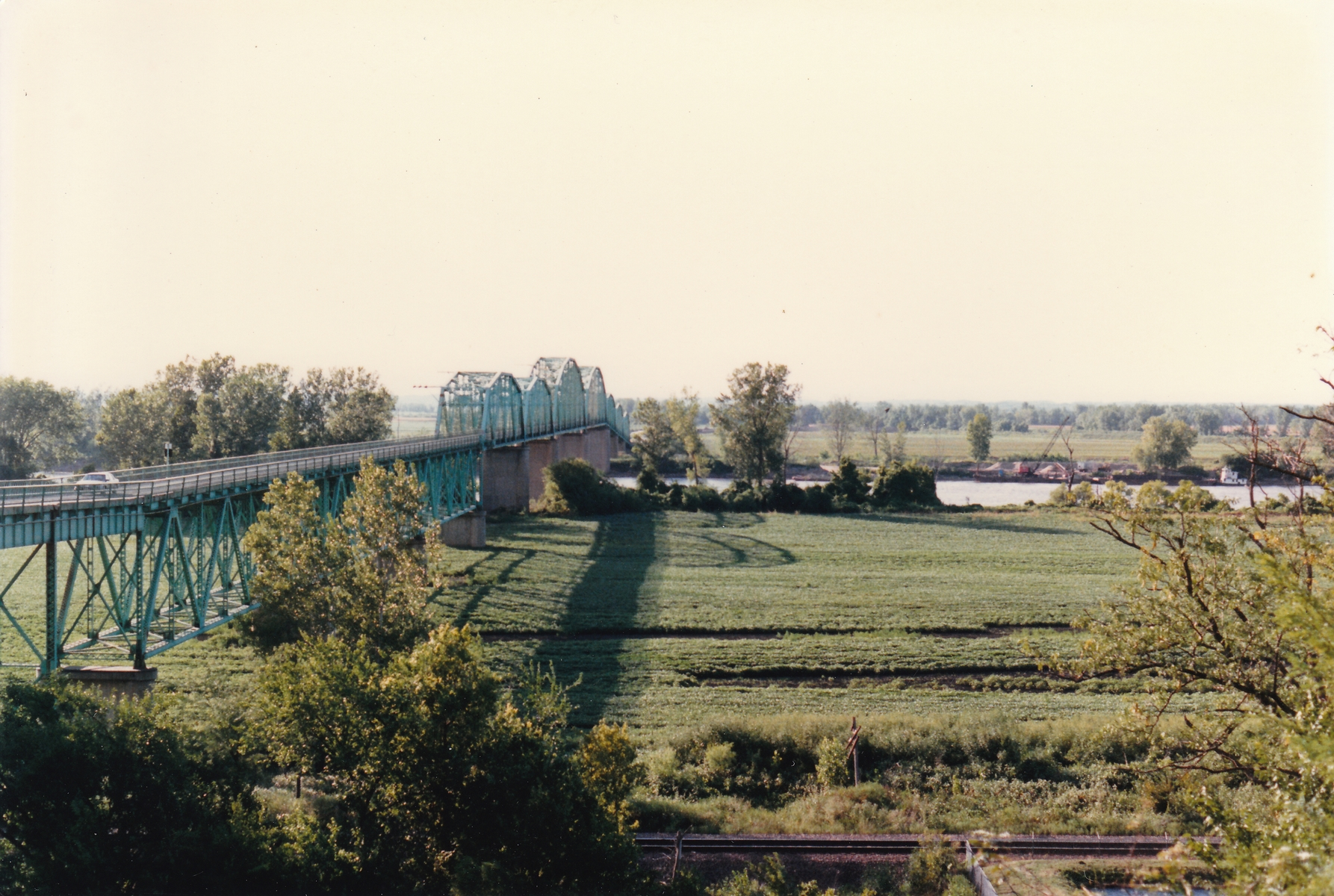
The former Lexington Bridge was over the Missouri River just outside the city (1924–2005).

Lexington is located on the south bank of the Missouri River at the intersection of Missouri Route 13 and US Route 24.

According to the United States Census Bureau, the city has a total area of 5.38 square miles (13.93 km^{2}), of which 5.15 square miles (13.34 km^{2}) is land and 0.23 square miles (0.60 km^{2}) is water.

== Demographics ==
Historical population
Census	Pop.	Note	%±
1850	2,698		—
1860	4,122		52.8%
1870	4,373		6.1%
1880	3,996		−8.6%
1890	4,537		13.5%
1900	4,190		−7.6%
1910	5,242		25.1%
1920	4,695		−10.4%
1930	4,595		−2.1%
1940	5,341		16.2%
1950	5,074		−5.0%
1960	4,845		−4.5%
1970	5,388		11.2%
1980	5,063		−6.0%
1990	4,860		−4.0%
2000	4,453		−8.4%
2010	4,726		6.1%
2020	4,652		−1.6%
U.S. Decennial Census

=== Racial and ethnic composition ===
Lexington city, Missouri – Racial and ethnic composition Note: the US Census treats Hispanic/Latino as an ethnic category. This table excludes Latinos from the racial categories and assigns them to a separate category. Hispanics/Latinos may be of any race.
Race / Ethnicity (NH = Non-Hispanic)	Pop 2000	Pop 2010	Pop 2020	% 2000	% 2010	% 2020
White alone (NH)	4,007	4,031	3,814	89.98%	85.29%	81.99%
Black or African American alone (NH)	268	279	231	6.02%	5.90%	4.97%
Native American or Alaska Native alone (NH)	8	19	21	0.18%	0.40%	0.45%
Asian alone (NH)	22	39	35	0.49%	0.83%	0.75%
Native Hawaiian or Pacific Islander alone (NH)	2	31	2	0.04%	0.66%	0.04%
Other race alone (NH)	3	7	13	0.07%	0.15%	0.28%
Mixed race or Multiracial (NH)	46	147	286	1.03%	3.11%	6.15%
Hispanic or Latino (any race)	97	173	250	2.18%	3.66%	5.37%
Total	4,453	4,726	4,652	100.00%	100.00%	100.00%

=== 2020 census ===
As of the 2020 census, Lexington had a population of 4,652. The median age was 41.0 years. 21.5% of residents were under the age of 18 and 19.1% of residents were 65 years of age or older. For every 100 females, there were 95.4 males, and for every 100 females age 18 and over, there were 94.2 males age 18 and over.

0.0% of residents lived in urban areas, while 100.0% lived in rural areas.

There were 1,840 households in Lexington, of which 28.0% had children under the age of 18 living in them. Of all households, 40.3% were married-couple households, 18.8% were households with a male householder and no spouse or partner present, and 31.4% were households with a female householder and no spouse or partner present. About 32.2% of all households were made up of individuals, and 14.7% had someone living alone who was 65 years of age or older.

There were 2,065 housing units, of which 10.9% were vacant. The homeowner vacancy rate was 2.9% and the rental vacancy rate was 6.0%.

Racial composition as of the 2020 census
Race	Number	Percent
White	3,907	84.0%
Black or African American	232	5.0%
American Indian and Alaska Native	23	0.5%
Asian	36	0.8%
Native Hawaiian and Other Pacific Islander	2	0.0%
Some other race	120	2.6%
Two or more races	332	7.1%

=== 2010 census ===
As of the census of 2010, there were 4,726 people, 1,867 households, and 1,201 families living in the city. The population density was 917.7 inhabitants per square mile (354.3/km^{2}). There were 2,127 housing units at an average density of 413.0 per square mile (159.5/km^{2}). The racial makeup of the city was 87.3% White, 6.1% African American, 0.5% Native American, 0.9% Asian, 0.7% Pacific Islander, 1.2% from other races, and 3.4% from two or more races. Hispanic or Latino of any race were 3.7% of the population.

There were 1,867 households, of which 32.4% had children under the age of 18 living with them, 45.5% were married couples living together, 13.3% had a female householder with no husband present, 5.5% had a male householder with no wife present, and 35.7% were non-families. 31.1% of all households were made up of individuals, and 13.5% had someone living alone who was 65 years of age or older. The average household size was 2.38 and the average family size was 2.94.

The median age in the city was 39.6 years. 23.8% of residents were under the age of 18; 9.6% were between the ages of 18 and 24; 23.5% were from 25 to 44; 26.1% were from 45 to 64; and 17% were 65 years of age or older. The gender makeup of the city was 48.9% male and 51.1% female.

=== 2000 census ===
As of the census of 2000, there were 4,453 people, 1,815 households, and 1,210 families living in the city. The population density was 1,279.7 inhabitants per square mile (494.1/km^{2}). There were 2,015 housing units at an average density of 579.1 per square mile (223.6/km^{2}). The racial makeup of the city was 91.02% White, 6.04% African American, 0.18% Native American, 0.49% Asian, 0.04% Pacific Islander, 1.06% from other races, and 1.17% from two or more races. Hispanic or Latino of any race were 2.18% of the population.

There were 1,815 households, out of which 31.1% had children under the age of 18 living with them, 48.9% were married couples living together, 13.3% had a female householder with no husband present, and 33.3% were non-families. 30.0% of all households were made up of individuals, and 15.0% had someone living alone who was 65 years of age or older. The average household size was 2.37 and the average family size was 2.90.

In the city, the population was spread out, with 25.2% under the age of 18, 8.0% from 18 to 24, 26.0% from 25 to 44, 22.7% from 45 to 64, and 18.0% who were 65 years of age or older. The median age was 38 years. For every 100 females, there were 89.2 males. For every 100 females age 18 and over, there were 85.7 males.

The median income for a household in the city was $32,759, and the median income for a family was $39,583. Males had a median income of $31,672 versus $21,646 for females. The per capita income for the city was $17,879. About 12.8% of families and 14.9% of the population were below the poverty line, including 22.1% of those under age 18 and 11.5% of those age 65 or over.

== History ==
=== Founding ===
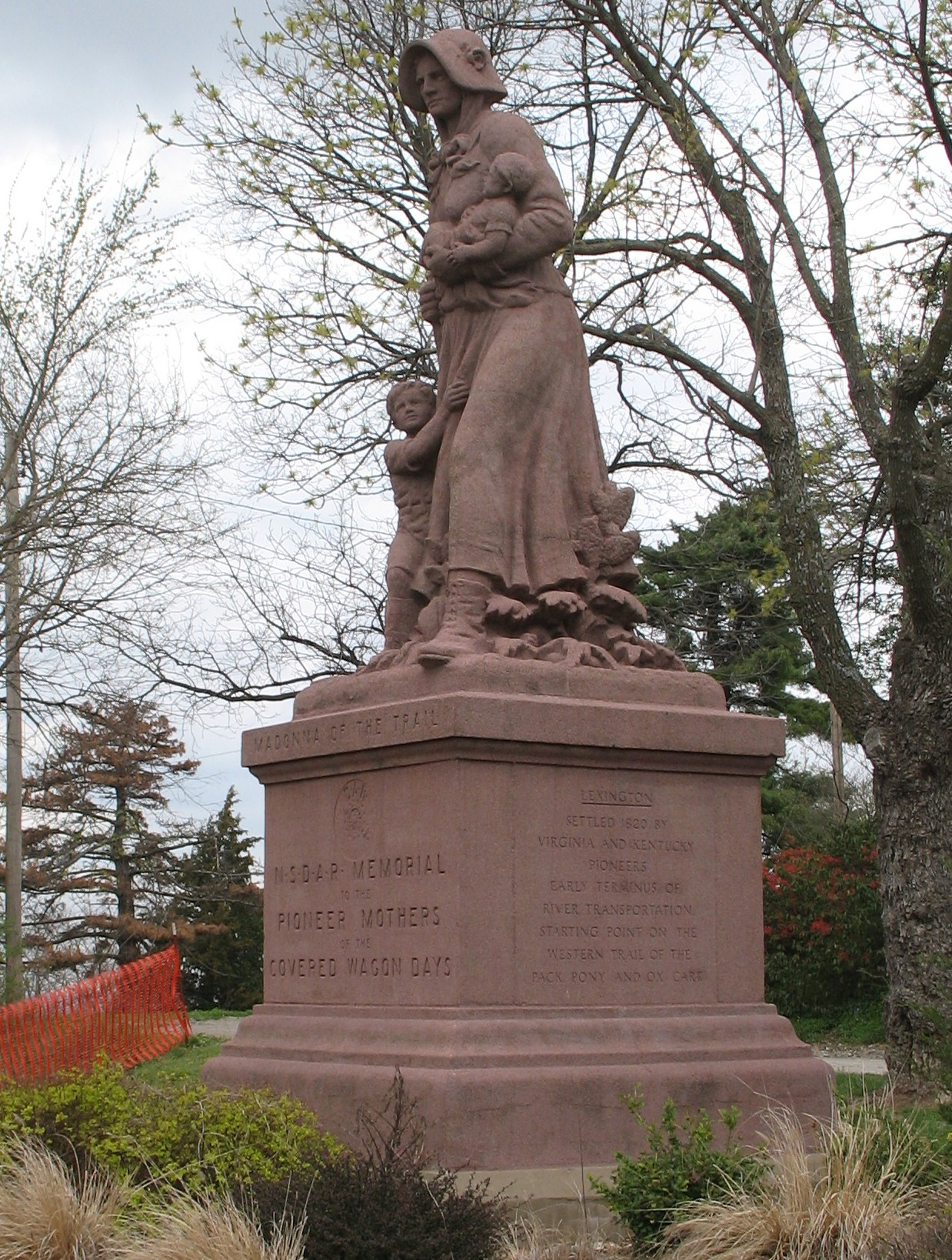
The Madonna of the Trail monument is on the edge of downtown Lexington, and was dedicated by Harry S. Truman in 1928.

Lexington is located on the bluffs of the Missouri River. It was platted in 1822 near William Jack's Ferry, which had been established three years earlier on the south bank of the river. It was named in commemoration of the Battle of Lexington. The first ferry was established in 1819 by Lexington's founder, Gilead Rupe. In 1823, Lexington became the county seat of Lafayette County and grew rapidly.

=== Growth as a trading center ===
John Aull opened a mercantile store in 1822, and he was soon joined by his brothers James and Robert. The Aull Brothers firm soon had a frontier chain, also operating stores in Independence, Westport and Liberty. Other merchants came, as did farmers and planters who specialized in hemp, tobacco and cattle.

With the emphasis on trade and agriculture, Lexington and Lafayette County also had one of the largest slave populations in the state. Many homes in town still have the old slave quarters behind them.

Lexington was a bustling and prosperous city, the largest city west of St. Louis in the 1830s and 1840s. During that period, it was the major center for merchants and outfitters as trappers, traders, and emigrants prepared to travel westward on the Santa Fe Trail, California Trail, Oregon Trail, and the Mormon Trail to Utah. Goods sent west from Lexington were valued at $450,000 in 1843. Rope walks, slaughter houses, a foundry and a furniture factory were among other early Lexington industries. In the 1840s, Russell, Majors and Waddell, the largest trading firm in the West, established its headquarters on Main Street. In the 1850s, these three men had 3500 wagons carrying goods from Missouri to Sacramento, Denver, and other points, and in 1860, they would found the Pony Express.

The steamboat trade on the river became a hugely profitable investment, and the wharf was a center of commerce. Productive coal mines, among the first in the state, were dug into the surrounding river bluffs to provide fuel for river steamers. In 1852, one of the worst steamboat accidents in Missouri history occurred at Lexington. The side-wheeler Saluda was carrying 250 Mormons en route to Salt Lake City when its boilers exploded, killing over 150 people. Many children orphaned by the blast were adopted by Lexingtonians. In March 1856, the Arabia steamboat was stopped and searched by pro-slavery Border Ruffians near Lexington, who confiscated 100 rifles and 2 cannons en route to the slavery-free Kansas Territory from the abolitionist Massachusetts Aid Society.

=== Architecture ===
Lexington has historical architecture, especially its public buildings. The Greek Revival Lafayette County Courthouse, built in 1847 on Main Street, is the oldest courthouse in continuous use west of the Mississippi. The Masonic College, also built in the Greek Revival style, operated from 1847 to 1857, and after the Civil War, it housed the Central College for Women. The Gothic Revival Christ Episcopal Church, built in 1848, has an interior finished in walnut and a ceiling ornamented with a Gothic truss arch. Lexington has over 150 homes and public buildings built before the Civil War, and annually holds well-attended tours of its historic homes and buildings.

In addition to the Lafayette County Courthouse, the Anderson House and Lexington Battlefield, Minatree Catron House, John E. Cheatham House, Commercial Community Historic District, Cumberland Presbyterian Church, Theodore Gosewisch House, Alexander and Elizabeth Aull Graves House, Hicklin Hearthstone, Hicklin School, Highland Avenue Historic District, House at 1413 Lafayette St., David John House, George Johnson House, Linwood Lawn, Old Neighborhoods Historic District, William P. Robinson House, Thomas Shelby House, Spratt-Allen-Aull House, Thomas Talbot and Rebecca Walton Smithers Stramcke House, D. W. B. and Julia Waddell Tevis House, Waddell House, and Wentworth Military Academy are listed on the National Register of Historic Places.

=== Civil War and aftermath ===
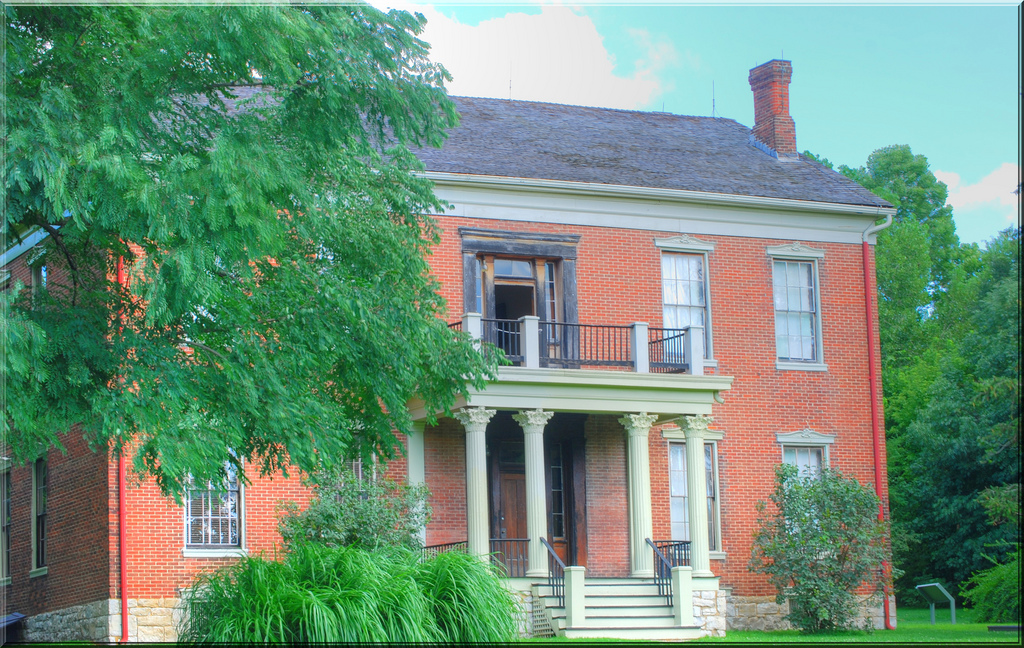
Anderson House was used as a field hospital in the Civil War during the Battle of Lexington.

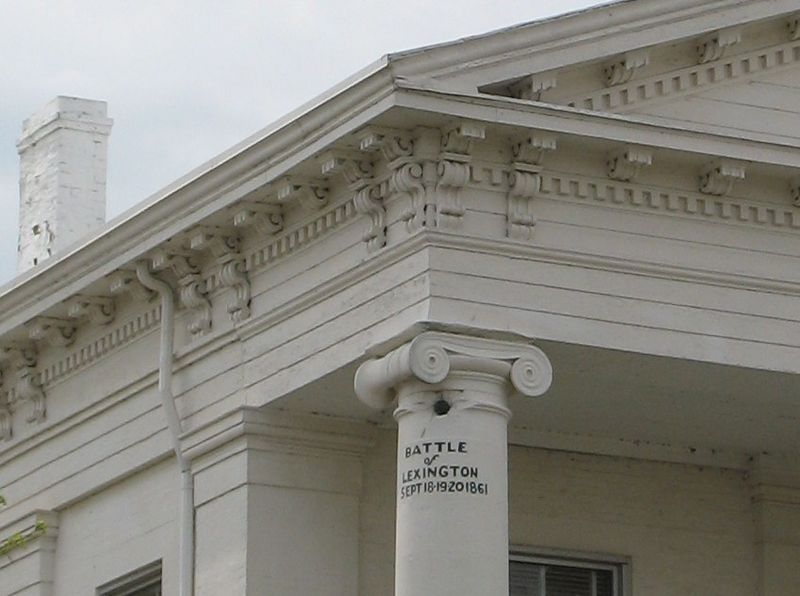
A cannonball from the 1861 Battle of Lexington is lodged in the upper left column of the Lafayette County Courthouse.

Lexington had two of the largest battles in the western campaign of the American Civil War. The better-known Battle of Lexington is commonly referred to as the Battle of the Hemp Bales. On September 12, 1861, between 6,000 and 10,000 soldiers of the Missouri State Guard, led by Major General Sterling Price, began a siege against the Federal military post in the old Masonic College commanded by Colonel James A. Mulligan.

On September 18, Price's army mounted an assault. Some of Price's army used hemp bales as moving breastworks while they moved up the river bluffs and closed in on Mulligan's headquarters. On September 20, 1861, Mulligan's troops surrendered. Combined casualties were 73 dead, 270 wounded. The battlefield on the bluffs of the Missouri River is now a state park, and the cannonball stuck in one of the upper pillars of the Courthouse has become a symbol for the town.

The Second Battle of Lexington occurred during Price's Missouri Expedition on October 19, 1864.

Lexington was known as a center for Quantrill's Raiders during the war. Two months after the Civil War ended, many of these guerrilla fighters who had refused to honor the cease fire finally decided to take advantage of the special Federal amnesty that was declared for such forces and turn themselves in at Lexington. While riding into town, reportedly under a white flag, they were fired upon by Union soldiers from the 2nd Wisconsin Cavalry, and Jesse James was severely wounded in the right lung. Some credit this event as a major contributing factor to his post-war career as a legendary bank robber. It is likely not a coincidence that the James-Younger Gang targeted the Alexander Mitchell bank in Lexington for the second daylight bank robbery in United States history. In December 1866, Archie Clement, an accomplice of the James brothers and perhaps the most notorious of all the guerrilla fighters, terrorized the town and was shot from his horse and killed by a sniper perched in the second floor of the Courthouse.

=== Athens of the West ===
Lexington never returned to its pre-war prominence, succeeded by Kansas City as the most important city in western Missouri. Particularly harmful was arrival of the transcontinental railroad, which supplanted the river commerce. Several institutions of higher education were established, leading the town to bill itself as the "Athens of the West". Especially significant were three schools for women, the Elizabeth Aull Seminary, Lexington Ladies College, and Central College for Women. Until its closing in 2017, Wentworth Military Academy, founded in 1880, drew students from throughout the country and around the world.

== Lexington businesses ==
Until the 1980s, Lexington was the headquarters and main distribution point for Mattingly's and Matco Stores, which was purchased by P.M. Place Stores. In 2000 the Place's stores were purchased by ShopKo to be converted into Pamida stores. In 2004 the former Mattingly warehouse was sold by Pamida. In August 2004 liquidation of the former Matco #101, then a Pamida, began and the store was closed by the end of October. This was the end of the Mattingly store legacy in Lexington. Hugh Mattingly had been a mentor to Wal-Mart founder, Sam Walton.

Dunbrooke began as a dress shirt company in 1939 in Lexington and became a nationwide logoed apparel manufacturer. Dunbrooke's signature jacket line began in the 1950s under government contract to produce nylon jackets for the Korean War. The company's name changed from "Dunhill" (1939) to "Dunbrooke Shirt Company" (1963) to "Dunbrooke Sportswear" (1971) to Dunbrooke Apparel Corp (2003). Dunbrooke was purchased from parent company American Marketing Industries (AMI) in October 2003.

== Education ==
Lexington R-V School District, which covers the municipality, operates Lexington High School and Lex La-Ray Technical Center, a bi-county vocational school.

Lexington has a public library, a branch of the Trails Regional Library.

Metropolitan Community College has the Lexington school district area in its service area, but not its in-district taxation area.

== Notable people ==
=== Government ===
- Thomas Peter Akers, congressman, 1856–1857
- John P. Campbell Jr., lawyer, congressman, 1848–1852
- Thomas B. Catron, US senator
- Mark L. De Motte, lawyer, editor of the Lexington Register, congressman
- Alexander Graves, lawyer, congressman, 1883–1885
- Josh Hawley, lawyer, Attorney General of Missouri, elected US senator in 2018
- Frank L. Houx, lawyer, governor of Wyoming
- John Telemachus Johnson, congressman
- Atterson W. Rucker, lawyer, congressman
- Samuel Locke Sawyer, Lawyer, congressman, 1879–1881
- Ike Skelton, congressman, 1977–2011
- John Welborn, lawyer, congressman, 1905–1907

=== Business ===
- William Hepburn Russell, freighter, partner in Russell, Majors and Waddell, founder of the Pony Express
- William C. Schwartz, physicist, laser pioneer, founder of International Laser Systems
- William B. Waddell, freighter, partner in Russell, Majors and Waddell, founder of the Pony Express
- James "Bud" Walton, co-founder of Wal-Mart

=== Athletics ===
- Chris Banks, NFL football player for 1998 Super Bowl champion Denver Broncos
- Lenvil Elliott, NFL football player
- Med Park, NBA basketball player
- Ron Tabb, professional long-distance runner

=== Military ===
- Alexander William Doniphan, lawyer, Mexican–American War hero
- William M. Hoge, oversaw construction of the ALCAN Highway and directed capture of the Remagen Bridge in World War II
- Harold G. Schrier, helped raise flag over Iwo Jima

=== Arts and entertainment ===
- James Lane Allen, author
- Matt Kindt, comic book artist
- Maude Fulton, Broadway actress
- Randall Garrett, Science Fiction & Fantasy author
- George Kriehn, writer and lecturer on art
- Carl Stalling, composer and arranger for the Bugs Bunny and other Looney Tunes cartoons from the 1930s through the 1950s

=== Academia ===
- John H. Little, superintendent of Wentworth Military Academy, 2002–2007
- James M. Sellers, commandant, superintendent, and president of Wentworth Military Academy, 1920–1990
- James M. Sellers Jr., superintendent of Wentworth Military Academy, 1973–1990
- Ovid R. Sellers, Old Testament scholar and archaeologist
- Sandford Sellers, president of Wentworth Military Academy, 1880–1938
- William W. Sellers, president of Wentworth Military Academy, 2008–2013
- Stephen G. Wentworth, banker, founder of Wentworth Military Academy
- Lester B. Wikoff, athletic director, treasurer, and superintendent of Wentworth Military Academy, 1915–1971

=== Outlaws ===
- Hoodoo Brown, leader of the Dodge City Gang in Las Vegas, New Mexico
- Archie Clement, notorious guerrilla outlaw, killed in Lexington in 1866
- John Newman Edwards, publisher of the Lexington Expositor, creator of the Jesse James legend
- Jesse James, wounded while going to surrender in Lexington, 1865; committed second daylight bank robbery in Lexington, 1866

=== Religion ===
- Judith Craig, bishop of the United Methodist Church
- Thomas Francis Lillis, former Roman Catholic bishop

== See also ==
- List of cities in Missouri
- Lexington Historical Museum
