= Lexington Historical Museum =

Historic place in Missouri, United States

- Cumberland Presbyterian Church
- U.S. National Register of Historic Places
- U.S. Historic district – Contributing property
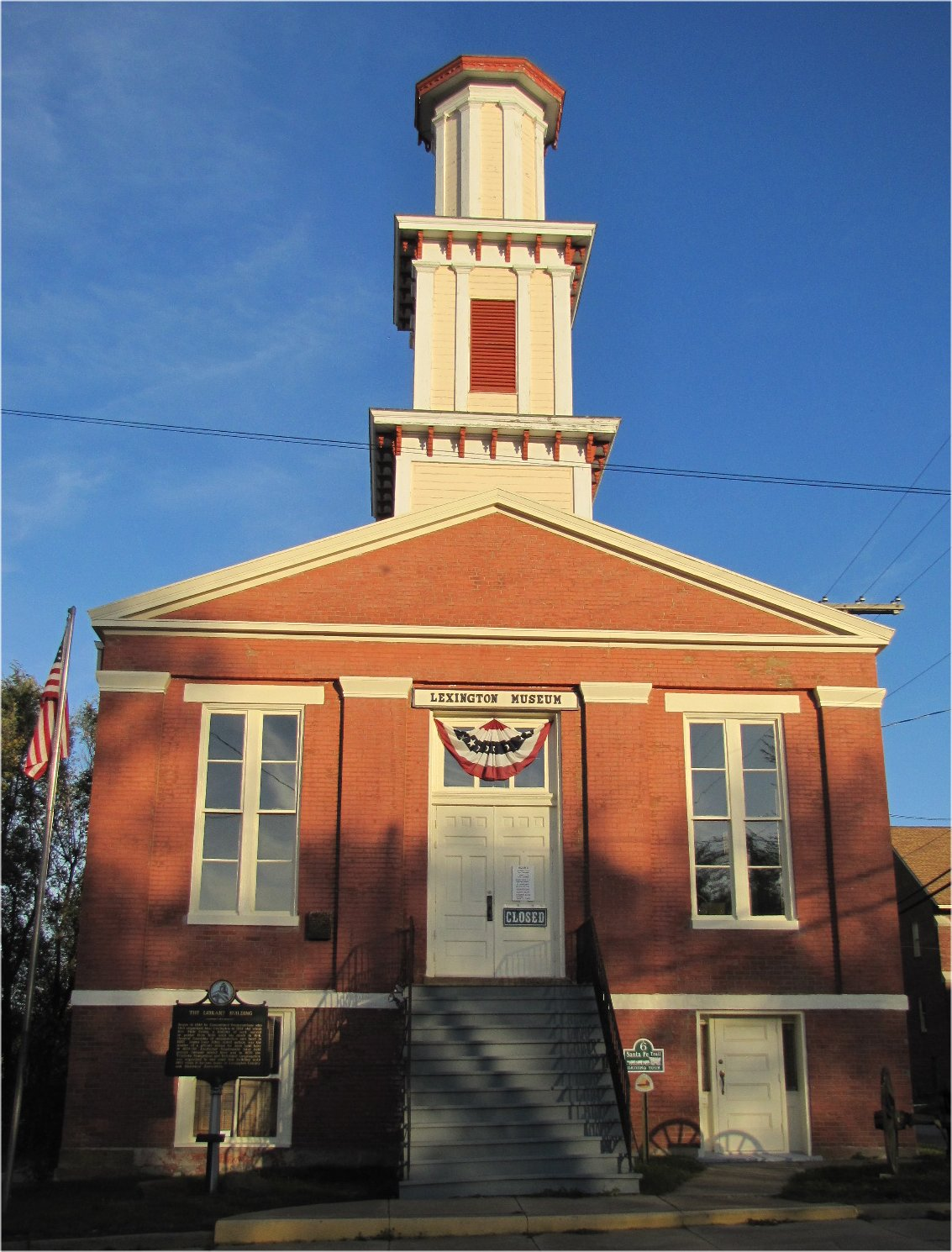
- Lexington Historical Museum

- Location within Missouri Location within the United States
- Location: 112 S. 13th St., Lexington, Missouri
- Coordinates: 39°11′6″N 93°52′45″W
- Area: 0.8 acres (0.32 ha)
- Built: 1846
- Architectural style: Greek Revival
- NRHP reference No.: 78001665
- Added to NRHP: November 14, 1978

The Lexington Historical Museum is a museum with a collection of historic items related to Lexington, Missouri. The Greek Revival building was constructed in 1846 and was added to the National Register of Historic Places in 1978. It is located in the Old Neighborhoods Historic District.

== History ==
Originally the Cumberland Presbyterian Church, and at one time the Old Library Building, the museum was restored with help from the local gardening club, and opened in 1976.

== Bibliography ==
- Slusher, Roger E. (2013). Lexington. Arcadia Publishing. ISBN 978-1-4671-1033-4.
