= Hodge (surname) =

Hodge is a surname. Notable people with the surname include:

- Þóranna Kika Hodge-Carr (born 1999), Icelandic basketball player
- Abdul Hodge (born 1983), American football linebacker
- Adaejah Hodge (born 2006), British Virgin Islands athlete
- Al Hodge (1912–1979), American actor
- Al Hodge (rock musician) (1951–2006), English guitarist and songwriter
- Alan Hodge (1915–1979), English historian
- Alexander Hodge (Born In Sydney), Australian actor
- Alexander Hodge (bowls) (Born In Scotland), Scottish lawn bowler
- Albena Lake-Hodge (1920-1985), Anguillan politician
- Albert Hodge (1875-1917), Scottish born sculptor
- Aldis Hodge (born 1986), American actor
- Alice Jean Arden-Hodge (1914-2012), American high jumper
- Angie Hodge-Zickerman, American mathematics educator
- Andrea Hodge, Colombian-American materials scientist
- Andrew Hodge (Disambiguation)
- Anton Hodge (born 1969), British writer
- Alphonso Hodge (born 1982), American gridiron footballer player
- Archibald Alexander Hodge (1823–1886), American Presbyterian leader
- Arthur Hodge (Disambiguation)
- Barry Hodge (born 1944), Australian politician
- Benjamin Hodge (Disambiguation)
- Bill Hodge (1882–1958), Scottish football manager
- Bo Hodge (born 1981), American tennis player
- Bob Hodge (linguist) (born 1940), Australian linguist
- Bobby Hodge (born 1954), English former footballer
- Brad Hodge (born 1974), Australian cricketer
- Brandon Hodge, American producer, songwriter and multi-instrumentalist
- Brenda Hodge (born 1951), Australian convicted murderer
- Brendan Hodge (born 1984), Canadian rower
- Brent Hodge (born 1985), Canadian documentary flimmaker
- Brian Hodge, American writer of horror & crime
- Brooke Hodge (born 1960, Vancouver, B.C..), American museum adminstrator and curator
- Bryan Hodge (born 1987), Scottish footballer
- Bryon Hodge (born 1992), Australian rugby union player
- Caspar Wistar Hodge (Disambiguation)
- Catfish Hodge (born 1945), American blues musician
- Chad Hodge (born 1977), American television writer and producer
- Chaka Hodge (born 1982), Anguillan cricketer
- Charles Hodge (1797–1878), principal of Princeton Theological Seminary
- Charlie Hodge (Disambiguation)
- Chinaka Hodge (born 1984), American poet, educator, playwright, and screenwriter
- Chris Hodge, English rock singer-songwriter
- Christopher Grose-Hodge (1924-1998), British fencer
- Cliff Hodge (born 1998), Filipino-American basketball player
- Clifton F. Hodge (1859-1949), American naturalist and professor
- Cora Richardson-Hodge (born in Saint Thomas, U.S. Virgin Islands), Anguillan politician been the Premier of Anguilla
- D'Moi Hodge (born 1998), British Virgin Islands basketball player
- Dallas Hodge (born 1954), American blues musician and record producer
- Damon Hodge (born 1977), American football player
- Daniel Hodge (born 1959), Prime Minister of Curaçao 2012–13
- Danni Wyatt-Hodge (born 1991), English cricket
- Danny Hodge (1932–2020), American professional boxer and wrestler
- Darius Hodge (born 1998), American football player
- Dave Hodge (born 1945), Canadian sports announcer currently working for The Sports Network
- David Hodge (Disambiguation)
- Dawson Hodge (born 2001), Canadian gridiron football player
- Derek Hodge (1941-2011), U.S. Virgin Islander politician and lawyer
- Derrick Hodge (born 1979), American musician and composer
- Donald Hodge (Disambiguation)
- Douglas Hodge (born 1960), British actor
- Douglas Hodge (businessman) (born 1957), American CEO of PIMCO, charged with fraud for allegedly participating in the 2019 college admissions bribery scandal
- Duncan Hodge (born 1974), Scotland international rugby union player & coach
- Dustin Hodge (born In Stephenville, Texas), American television writer and producer
- Ed Hodge (born 1958), American basketball pitcher
- Edward Hodge (1810-1894), British Army officer
- Edward Hodge (1782-1815), British Army officer killed In action
- Edward Grose-Hodge (1855-1928), English cleric and academic
- Edwin Hodge (born 1985), American actor
- Elliot Hodge (born 1996), English professional footballer plays in Midfielder
- Floyd Hodge (born 1959), American footballer player
- Francis Edwin Hodge (1881-1949), British artist painter
- Frank Hodge (born 1894), English badminition player
- Frederick Hodge (Disambiguation)
- Gaynel Hodge (1937-2020), American recording artist, songwriter, and pianist
- George Hodge (Disambiguation)
- Gomer Hodge (1944-2007), American baseball player
- Gregory Hodge (died 2019), the principal for over a decade at The FDA in Harlem
- Hannah Hodge (1751-c.1833), coalminer from Lochgelly in Fife
- Harold Hodge (1904–1990), toxicologist, first president of the Society of Toxicology
- Helena Norberg-Hodge (born 1946), Swedish activista and documentary director
- Henry Hodge (1944-2009), British judge
- Henry Wilson Hodge (1865–1919), American civil engineer
- Herbert Hodge (born 1901), London taxi driver, author, and BBC radio personality.
- Huck Hodge (1977), American composer
- Humfrey Grose-Hodge (1891-1962), British writer and headmaster
- Kameisha Jerae Hodge (born 1989), American writer
- Kate Hodge (born 1966), American actress and flim producer
- Katrina Hodge (born 1987), British army from Royal Tunbridge Wells
- Kavem Hodge (born 1993) Dominica and West Indies cricketer
- Kelley B. Hodge (born 1971), American judge
- Ken Hodge (b. 1944), English-Canadian ice hockey player
- Ken Hodge Jr. (born 1966), Canadian-born American ice hockey player
- Kevin and Keith Hodge (born 1974), American comedians
- James Hodge (Disambiguation)
  - James W. Hodge, American cancer immunologist and senior investigator in the (NCI)
- Jane Aiken Hodge (1917-2009), American novelist
- Janice Daniel-Hodge (born 1962 in England), Saint Kitts and Nevis businesswoman and politician
- Jascha Franklin-Hodge (born 1979), American civil servant
- Jeff Hodge (born 1966), American basketball player
- Jermaine Hodge (born 1981), American Greco-Roman wrestler
- Jevin Hodge, American politician member of the Arizona House of Representatives
- Joe Hodge (born 2002), Footballer
- Joel Hodge, American cinematographer
- John Hodge (Disambiguation)
  - John Hodge, friend of Thomas founder paper merchant Spalding & Hodge
  - John Hodge (music producer), American produced their work the band The Pyramids
- Jonathan Hodge (1941–2019), British composer
- Jonathon Hodge (born 1948), American teacher and astronomy communicator from 18117 Jonhodge in the Meanings of minor-planet names: 18001–19000
- Josh Hodge (born 2000), English rugby union player
- Julian Hodge (1904-2004), British banker
- Julius Hodge (born 1983), American professional basketball player
- Justin Hodge (born 1815), Connecticut politician
- KhaDarel Hodge (born 1995), American football player
- Lawrence Hodge (1902-1960), Australian rules footballer
- Len Hodge (born 1941 or 1942), New Zealand driver
- Lindel Hodge (born 1959), British Virgin Islands sprinter
- Louisa Hodge, American journalist reporter for KCBS-2/KCAL-9 at CBS Studio Center in Studio City, California
- Luce Hodge-Smith, British Virgin Islands politician
- Luke Hodge (bon 1984), Australian rules footballer
- Luke Hodge (rugby league) (born 1999), Italy international rugby league footballer
- Mabel Hodge (1862-1938), New Zealand teacher and headmistress
- Macey Hodge (born 2001), American soccer player
- Malcolm Hodge (born 1934), Australian cricketer
- Matt Hodge (born 2004), Belgian basketball player
- Matthew Henry Hodge (1805–1877), Congregationalist minister in Port Adelaide, South Australia
- Margaret Hodge (born 1944), British politician
- Margaret Emily Hodge (1858–1938), British educator, suffragist, pacifist and urban district councillor who established teacher training courses in Australia
- Martin Hodge (born 1959), English footballer
- Mary Hodge (born 1946), American politician
- Mary Wilma Hodge (1909-1999), American physicist and college professor
- Max Hodge (1916-2007), American screenwriter
- Megan Hodge (born 1988), American indoor volleyball player at Penn State
- Merle Hodge (born 1944), Trinidadian novelist and literary critic
- Merton Hodge (1903-1958), New Zealand playwright, actor and medical practitioner
- Michael Hodge (born 1989), Former rugby union player/current coach
- Michelle Hodge (born 1975), New Zeland football goalkeeper
- Mike Hodge (1947-2017), American actor
- Milford Hodge (born 1961), American football player
- Montcin Hodge (born 1987), Anguillan cricketer
- Neville Hodge (born 1955), Sprinter
- Nicholas Vere-Hodge (1912-2005), English cricketer and Royal Air Force officer
- Odell Hodge (born 1973), American basketball player at Old Dominion University
- Omar Hodge, British Virgin Islands politician
- Orlando J. Hodge (1828-1912), American legislative leader
- Orville Hodge (1904-1986), American politician
- Patricia Hodge (born 1946), British actor
- Patrick Hodge, Lord Hodge (born 1953), British judge
- Paul Hodge (1910–1976), American bridge player
- Paul Rapsey Hodge (1808-1871), English-American inventor and mechanical engineer
- Paul W. Hodge (1934–2019), American astronomer
- Penny Hodge (1920-2016), Canadian officer worker and activist
- Percy Hodge (1890-1967), British athlete
- Peter Hodge (1871-1934), Scottish footballer manager
- Philip G. Hodge (1920–2014), American material scientist
- Porter Hodge (born 2001) American baseball player of the Chicago Cubs
- Preston Hodge (born 2002), American football player
- Ralph Hodge (1953-2018), American basketball coach
- Reece Hodge (born 1994), Australia international rugby union player
- Robert Hodge (Disambiguation)
  - Robert Leroy Hodge (born 1979), American artist
  - Roberto Hodge (1944-1986), Chilean footballer
- Roger Hodge (born 1967), American editor
- Rosamund Hodge, Author wirter
- Ross Hodge (born 1980), American college basketball coach
- Rowland Hodge (1859-1950), English shipbuilder
- Rudel Hodge Jr. American politician from United States Virgin Islands
- Russ Hodge (1939–2026), American decathlete
- Ruth E. Hodge (born 1937), American activist, author, educator and community activist
- Sally Hodge (born 1966), Welsh track cyclist
- Samuel Hodge VC (1840–1868), British Virgin Islands war hero
- Samuel D. Hodge Jr., American professor and author
- Samuel F. Hodge, founder in manufacturer of marine engines Samuel F. Hodge & Company
- Sandra Hodge (born 1962), American basketball player
- Sandy Hodge (Disambiguation)
- Sedrick Hodge (born 1978), American footballer player
- Shay Hodge (born 1987), American footballer player
- Sheroma Hodge (born 1985), British model
- Shovel Hodge (1893-1967), American baseball player
- Simon Hodge (born 1994), Australian racing driver
- Stephanie Hodge (born 1956), American actress
- Stephen Hodge (Disambiguation)
- Steve Hodge (born 1962), English footballer
- Steven M. Hodge, Researcher in neuroimaging and biostatistics for named Plateau Lexington Table In Hodge Escarpment of Antarctida
- Sue Hodge (born 1957), British actress
- Susie Hodge (born 1960), British author and illustrator
- Tessa Lynn Hodge, American politician from California
- Terri Hodge, American politician served in the Texas House of Representatives
- Thea D. Hodge (1922-2008), American computer scientist
- Thomas Hodge (Disambiguation)
- Tim Hodge (born 1963), American animator
- Tim Hodge (politician), attorney member from Kansas House of Representatives
- Timothy Hodge (born 2001), Australian Paralympic swimmer
- Tom Hodge, British composer
- Tom Hodge (ice hockey) (died November 10, 1950), Canadian ice hockey, player, coach, executive and referee
- Triston Hodge (born 1994), Trinidadian footballer
- Vernon Hodge, Anguillan footballer manager
- Vicki Hodge (born 1946), English actress and model
- Virgil Hodge (born 1983), Saint Kitts and Nevis sprimter
- W. V. D. Hodge (1903–1975), Scottish mathematician and geometer
- Walter Hartman Hodge (1896–1975), American judge
- Walter Hodge (born 1986), Puerto Rican-Virgin Islander basketball player
- William Hodge (1874-1932), American actor and playwright
- William Hodge (footballer), Scottish professional footballer
- William Hodge II (born 1982), American Grammy Award
- William C. Hodge, American politician from Tennessee
- Zahrah Preble Hodge (1880-1934), American writer and performer

== Middle Name: ==
- Benjamin Hodge Mckenna (born 1999), Welsh politician
- Bert Hodge Hill (1874-1958), American archeologist
- Charles Hodge Mackie (1862-1920), Scottish artist
- Helen Hodge Harris (1892-1967), American aviator
- Herman Hodge Long (1912-1976), American college administrator
- James Hodge Codding (1849-1919), American politician member U.S. House of Representatives from Pennsylvania
- James Hodge Connell (born c. 1834), British leaving the business to his sons
- Jimmy Hodge Timmons (1939-2011), American politician served as Georgia State Senate
- Knashawn Hodge Morales, American biostatistician
- Linda Hodge McLaughlin (1942-1999), American district judge from California
- Pender Hodge Cudlip (1835-1911), English theologian and writer
- Thomas Hodge Allen (born 1945), American author and politician
- William Hodge Mill (1792-1853), English churchman and orientalist

== Fictional characters ==
- Cameron Hodge, comic-book supervillain
- Orson Hodge, a fictional supporting character in the television drama Desperate Housewives
- Hodge, a one of a kind custom built diesel from Chuggington who is Eddie's best mate.

== See also ==
- Hodges (surname)
- Hodge Kirnon (1891-1962), Montserratian scholar, historian, and literary critic
- Álvaro Hodeg (born 1996), Colombian racing cyclist
