= Hodges =

Hodges may refer to:

== People and fictional characters ==
- Hodges (surname)

== Places ==
=== United States ===
- Hodges Township, Stevens County, Minnesota
- Hodges, Alabama, a town in Franklin County, Alabama
- Hodges, South Carolina, a town in Greenwood County, South Carolina
- Hodges, West Virginia, an unincorporated community in Cabell County, West Virginia
- Lake Hodges, a lake and reservoir in Southern California

=== Historic houses ===
==== United States ====
- Hodges House (Bismarck, Arkansas)
- Hodges House (Carrollton, Illinois)
- Hodges House (Taunton, Massachusetts)

=== Other places ===
- Hodges Drive, a main west–east road in Joondalup, north of Perth, Western Australia
- Hodges Glacier, a small glacier one nautical mile west of Grytviken, South Georgia, Antarctica
- Hodges Point, a rocky point six nautical miles east-northeast of Cape Northrop
- Hodges, Jamaica, a small hamlet in Saint Elizabeth, Jamaica
- Mount Hodges, a mountain on the Thatcher Peninsula, Antarctica

== Other ==
- USS Hodges (DE-231), a Rudderow-class destroyer escort in the US Navy during World War II
- Hodges baronets, a title in the Baronetage of England
- Hodges Coaches, a family owned coach operator based in Sandhurst, Berkshire, UK
- Hodges Peak, a mountain in Wyoming
- Hodges Stadium, a multi-purpose stadium at the University of North Florida, US
- Hodges University, a private university in Naples, Florida, US

== See also ==
- Hodge (disambiguation)
