= John Hodges =

John Hodges may refer to:

- John Hodges (Malmesbury MP) (by 1503–1562), English member of parliament
- John Hodges (minstrel) (1821–1891), American entertainer
- John O. Hodges (1831–1897), American politician from Kentucky
- Jack Hodges (1841/1842–1899), Australian cricket umpire
- John Hodges (cricketer) (1855–1933), Australian cricketer
- John Neal Hodges (1884–1965), American military officer
- Johnny Hodges (1906–1970), American musician
- John Hodges (Australian politician) (1937–2024), Australian politician
- John Hodges (footballer) (born 1980), English footballer
- John Hodges (fl. 2012), cofounder of A24

== See also ==
- John Hodge (disambiguation)
- John Hodgman (born 1971), American writer & actor
