= George Hodges =

George Hodges may refer to:

- George Hodges (umpire), 19th-century Australian Test cricket umpire
- George Hodges (theologian) (1856–1919), American Protestant Episcopal theologian
- 'Girlie' George Chapple Hodges (1904-1999) Australian surgeon and field hockey player who represented Australia
- George Lloyd Hodges (1792–1862), British soldier and diplomat
- George Tisdale Hodges (1789–1860), U.S. Representative from Vermont
- George H. Hodges (1866–1947), 19th Kansas governor
- George Hodges (priest) (1851–1921), Anglican priest
- George Schuyler Hodges, American artist, inventor, and automobile industry pioneer

== See also ==
- George Hodge (disambiguation)
