= Hogge =

- Pronunciation: Hogge

Origin
- Origin: Anglo-Saxon
- Meaning: careful or prudent
- Region of origin: Anglo-Saxon

Other names
- Variant forms: Hoag, Hogue, Hodge, Hogg, Hoig

Hogge is a Scottish surname originally derived from hoga, an Old English term meaning prudent or careful.

During the 19th century many immigrants from Scotland settled along the east coast of what would become the United States and Canada. Many Hogge settlers came during this time, but others came much earlier, during the 17th century. Most Hogges were farmers. Some remained faithful to the crown and called themselves United Empire Loyalists, while others participated in the American War of Independence.

Passenger and immigration lists indicate that members of the Hogge family came to North America quite early: Daniel Hogg settled in Boston in 1651; along with John and Neile, Bernard, Charles, James, John, Peter, Richard and William Hogue all arrived in Philadelphia between 1840 and 1860.

In the early 20th century the Hogge family located in New Kent, Virginia, married into and became a part of the Chickahominy Indians Eastern Division, and held two seats on the Tribal Council.

== Variations ==
Spelling was not standardized in the Middle Ages, so that spelling variations in names, even within a single document, were common (for example, there were many different spellings of the name of William Shakespeare; he used six variants himself). Over the years Hogge has appeared as Hoge, Hoag, Hogue, Hodge, Hogg, Hoig, and others.

== Notable people ==
- Becky Hogge (born 1979), British writer and executive director
- James Hogge (1873–1928), British social researcher and politician
- Ralf Hogge, English blacksmith
- Vanessa Hogge (born 1963), British ceramic artist
