= Continuing Education of the Bar =

University of California program

- Founded: 1947
- Founder: University of California
- Country of origin: United States
- Headquarters location: Oakland, California
- Publication types: Books
- Nonfiction topics: Law
- Official website: ceb.com

CEB (Continuing Education of the Bar • California) is a self-supporting program of the University of California. Founded in 1947 to educate veterans returning to the practice of law after service in World War II, CEB offers three, six, and 24-hour continuing legal education (CLE) courses and practice guides.

CEB has received multiple awards from the Association for Continuing Legal Education (ACLEA), including the Award of Professional Excellence for Publications. In 2016, CEB accepted ACLEA’s Best Publication award for the book, “Employee Leave Laws: Compliance and Litigation.” In addition, in 2016, CEB was ranked as the best CLE provider in California by the readers of The Recorder legal newspaper for the sixth year in a row, and in 2013 the third-best legal research vendor.

== Objectives of the program ==
As set forth in the Memorandum of Understanding for the Sponsorship of the Continuing Education of the Bar Program by the Regents of the University of California, CEB's objectives are to:

1. Keep members of the legal profession informed of changes and developments in the law through instruction, publications and other services;
2. Provide continuing legal education to members of the legal profession in significant areas of legal practice;
3. Promote greater efficiency in the practice of law by providing instruction, publications, and other services for law office management;
4. Present courses and publish materials concerned with the ethical and professional responsibilities of the members of the legal profession;
5. Provide such other services supportive of the purposes set forth above.

== Governing committee ==
Oversight of CEB is provided by the CEB Governing Committee. The Committee consists of nine voting members: four members appointed by the State Bar of California and five members appointed by the University of California. The University appoints the chair, and the State Bar's Board of Governors appoints the vice chair. The vice chair must be a lawyer in active practice in California. The other members the State Bar appoints include the Executive Director of the State Bar, or the Executive Director's designee who must be a lawyer, and two members who are actively practicing law in California, at least one of whom represents the interests of the sections of the State Bar. The Committee reviews and approves CEB's annual publishing and educational program, strategic objectives, annual budget, and recommendations from the Director on the overall operation of CEB.

== CLE courses ==
CEB's CLE courses are typically presented by practicing attorneys and judges with expertise in the course's subject matter. All CEB courses are also available through CEB's "On Demand" service. In June 2012, CEB began offering podcasts on recent developments, beginning with two podcasts on the decision in Brinker Restaurant Corp. v Superior Court (Hohnbaum) (2012) 53 C4th 1004.

CLE courses cover substantive practice areas including business law, criminal law, employment law, estate planning, real property law, family law, and litigation. CEB also offers law practice management programs, including "Making Sure You Get Paid: Accounts Receivable Management" which is available online to members of the Bar free of charge. CEB also tackles subjects required by the California State Bar's minimum Continuing Legal Education Program, including legal ethics, elimination of bias, and substance abuse.

Each year CEB and the University of California, Los Angeles School of Law present a 12-hour Estate Planning Institute in Los Angeles. The program focuses on advanced estate planning and estate tax issues. Each January, CEB presents a two-day fair in several locations across California that focuses on recent developments in the areas of estate planning, real property, business law, civil litigation and torts, and ethics.

In 2013, CEB created the Estate Planning Intensive Course (EPIC) and in 2015 CEB created the Family Law Intensive Course (FLIC). Both courses prepare attorneys for the Certified Specialist exams in their respective fields. The courses are online over 12 weeks from July to Oct every odd year before the late October exam is administered.

== Publications ==
- More than 120 regularly updated practice guides. CEB also publishes books on law practice management topics.
- Action Guides: short, softbound books that describe step-by-step how to handle a specific task for a client. Action Guides are updated every two years.
- Four periodicals: California Business Law Practitioner, California Business Law Reporter, Estate Planning and California Probate Reporter, and Real Property Law Reporter.

== Blog and social media ==
CEB offers free content to practicing attorneys and members of the public on its blog, law alerts, and discussion forums.
