= Hodges (surname) =

Hodges is a surname of English origin. Notable people with the surname include:

== Arts and entertainment ==
- Augustus M. Hodges (1854–1916), American journalist, newspaper editor, poet, and political organizer
- C. Walter Hodges (1909–2004), English illustrator and author
- Chas Hodges (1943–2018), English musician and singer, of the duo Chas & Dave
- David Hodges (born 1978), American songwriter, producer, composer, keyboardist and vocalist
- Eddie Hodges (born 1947), American former child actor and recording artist
- Edward Hodges (1796–1867), English organist and composer
- Faustina Hasse Hodges (1822–1895), English-American organist and composer
- Frenchy Jolene Hodges (born 1940), American educator and writer
- Jessy Hodges, American actress
- Jim Hodges (artist) (born 1957), New York–based installation artist
- John Hodges (minstrel) (1821–1891), early blackface minstrel entertainer
- Johnny Hodges (1906–1970), American alto saxophonist
- Jordon Hodges (born 1987), American actor
- Leigh Mitchell Hodges (1876–1954), American journalist, author, poet, and lecturer
- Michael Hodges (producer), American singer-songwriter, record producer, composer, executive music producer and music executive
- Mike Hodges (1932–2022), English screenwriter, film director, playwright and novelist
- Nicolas Hodges (born 1970), English pianist and teacher
- Teenie Hodges (1945–2014), American musician and songwriter
- William Hodges (1744–1797), English painter

== Math, science and technology ==
- David A. Hodges (1937–2022), American electrical engineer
- Joseph Lawson Hodges Jr. (1922–2000), American statistician
- Richard Hodges (archaeologist) (born 1952), British archaeologist
- Ronald W. Hodges (1934–2017), American entomologist
- Wilfrid Hodges (born 1941), British mathematician

== Law ==
- Ralph B. Hodges (1930–2013), American attorney, Justice of the Oklahoma Supreme Court
- Robert H. Hodges Jr. (born 1944), American federal judge
- William Hodges (judge) (1808–1868), English barrister and legal reporter
- William H. Hodges (1929–2017), retired Virginia Court of Appeals judge and state legislator
- William Terrell Hodges (1934–2022), United States District Judge

== Military ==
- Ben Hodges (born 1958), retired United States Army officer who served as lieutenant general
- Courtney Hodges (1887–1966), American military officer
- Lewis Hodges (1918–2007), Royal Air Force pilot

== Politics and business ==
- Frank Hodges (trade unionist) (1887–1947), English trade union leader and Member of Parliament
- Gene Hodges (1936–2014), American politician
- James Hodges (mayor) (1822–1885), American politician and businessman
- Jim Hodges (born 1956), American politician
- Kaneaster Hodges Jr. (1938–2022), American politician
- Kenneth Hodges (1952–2025), American politician in South Carolina and Baptist minister
- Luther H. Hodges (1898–1974), American politician
- Luther H. Hodges Jr. (born 1936), American politician and banker
- Martha Blakeney Hodges (1897–1969), American political hostess
- Max Hodges (1917–2009), Australian politician
- Monte Hodges (born 1971), American politician
- Richard Hodges (MP) (by 1523–1572), English politician
- Richard Hodges (American politician) (born 1963), defendant in the landmark Obergefell v. Hodges case
- Valarie Hodges (born 1955), American politician
- W. Randolph Hodges (1914–2005), American politician
- Sir William Hodges, 1st Baronet (1645–1714), English merchant in London and politician

== Sports ==
- Bill Hodges (born 1943), American basketball coach
- Bucky Hodges (born 1995), American football player
- Cooper Hodges (born 2000), American football player
- Craig Hodges (born 1960), American basketball player
- Curtis Hodges (born 1999), American football player
- Dave Hodges (rugby union) (born 1968), rugby player
- Devon Hodges (born 1984), Jamaican football player
- Devlin Hodges (born 1996), American football player
- Frank Hodges (footballer) (1891–1985), English football player
- Gil Hodges (1924–1972), American baseball player and manager
- 'Girlie' George Chapple Hodges (1904–1999), Australian surgeon and field hockey player who represented Australia
- Glyn Hodges (born 1963), Welsh football player and manager
- Jayden Hodges (born 1993), Australian rugby player
- Jehoida Hodges (1876–1930), Welsh rugby player
- John Hodges (cricketer) (1855–1933), Australian cricketer
- John Hodges (footballer) (born 1980), English football player
- Justin Hodges (born 1982), Australian rugby player
- Kevin Hodges (born 1960), English football player and manager
- Lee Hodges (footballer, born 1973), English football player and manager
- Lee Hodges (footballer, born 1978), English football player
- Leleith Hodges (born 1953), Jamaican sprinter
- Len Hodges (1920–1959), football player
- Ron Hodges (born 1949), American baseball player
- Russ Hodges (1910–1971), American sportscaster
- Wes Hodges (born 1984), American baseball player

== Other ==
- Corey J. Hodges (born 1970), African-American preacher and columnist
- H. A. Hodges (1905–1976), British philosopher and theologian
- Honestie Hodges (2006–2020), American teenager who influenced law enforcement policy
- Noel Hodges (1849–1928), British Anglican bishop in India
- Walter Hodges (academic) (died 1757), English academic administrator
- Zane C. Hodges (1932–2008), American Bible scholar

== Fictional characters ==
- ARP Warden William Hodges, from the British television series Dad's Army
- David Hodges (CSI), from CSI: Crime Scene Investigation
- Jonas Hodges, a minor character from the American television series 24
- Bob Hodges, a LAPD police officer from the movie Colors

== See also ==
- Hodge (surname)
