= Helen Harris =

Helen Harris may refer to:

- Helen Hodge Harris, American aviator
- Helen Webb Harris, American golf club founder
- Helen Petousis-Harris, New Zealand vaccinologist
- Helen Harris, a character in the novel Ready Player One and its film adaptation
- Helen Harris, character in Bridesmaids (2011 film)
