= Hodgers =

Hodgers is a surname. Notable people with the surname include:

- Antonio Hodgers (born 1976), Swiss politician
- Brian Hodgers (fl. 2025), American politician
- Sheila Hodgers (1956/57–1983), Irish cancer patient

== See also ==
- Hodges (surname)
