= Joseph Hood =

Joseph Hood may refer to:

- Sir Joseph Hood, 1st Baronet (1863–1931), British businessman and Conservative Party politician
- Joseph Martin Hood (born 1942), United States federal judge
- Joseph Douglas Hood, American entomologist
- Joseph Henry Hood (1846–1922), Australian judge

== See also ==
- Joey Hood (born 1976), American politician and member of the Mississippi House of Representatives
- Joey R. Hood, American diplomat
