= William Hodges (disambiguation) =

William Hodges was an English painter.

William Hodges may also refer to:

- William Terrell Hodges (born 1934), American judge
- ARP Warden William Hodges, Dad's Army character
- Sir William Hodges, 1st Baronet (1645–1714), English merchant and politician
- William Hodges (judge) (1808–1868), English barrister, legal writer and chief justice of Cape colony
- William Hodges (priest) (died 1684), Anglican priest
- William H. Hodges (born 1929), retired Virginia Court of Appeals judge and state legislator
- Bill Hodges (born 1943), former basketball coach

== See also ==
- William Hodge (1874–1932), American director, producer, performer and writer
- William Hodge (footballer) (1904–?), Scottish footballer
- Hodges (disambiguation)
