= Faustina Hasse =

Faustina Hasse is the name of one of the following persons:

- Faustina Hasse, born as Faustina Bordoni (1697–1781), Italian mezzo-soprano
- Faustina Hasse Hodges (1822–1895), English-American organist and composer
