= Frederick Hodges =

Frederick Hodges may refer to:

- Frederick Hodges (diver) (Frederick George Hodges), British diver
- Fred Hodges (politician) (Frederick Douglas Hodges), Canadian labour leader, civil rights activist and politician
- Ben Hodges (Frederick Benjamin Hodges III), United States Army general

== See also ==
- Frederick Hodge (disambiguation)
