= George Hodge =

George Hodge may refer to:

- George Hodge (cricketer) (1878–1953), cricket player from New Zealand
- George Baird Hodge (1828–1892), Confederate politician from Kentucky
- 'Girlie' George Chapple Hodges (1904-1999) Australian surgeon and field hockey player who represented Australia

== See also ==
- George Hodges (disambiguation)
