= No Excuses =

No Excuses may refer to:

== Books ==
- No Excuses (book), a 2010 book by Gloria Feldt
- No Excuses, a 2005 autobiographical book by Kyle Maynard

== Film and TV ==
- No Excuses, a 1983 television series, whose some episodes were written by Barrie Keeffe
- No Excuses, a competing team from the 2010 reality television series, Money Hungry
- No Excuses, a subtitle for the thirteenth season of The Biggest Loser (2012)
- MFC 9: No Excuses, one of Maximum Fighting Championship events in 2006
- "No Excuses", an approach used by an American principal, Gregory Hodge

== Music ==
- "No Excuses" (Alice in Chains song)
- "No Excuses" (Meghan Trainor song)
- "No Excuses" (Bru-C song)
- "No Excuses", a song by Childish Gambino from Bando Stone & the New World, 2024
- "No Excuses", a song by NF from his 2019 album The Search
- "No Excuses", a song from The Latest Fashion, a 2011 album by Attack! Attack!
- "No Excuses", a song by Needtobreathe from Hard Love
- "No Excuses", a song from Virginia to Vegas from his 2023 album Life Gets Interesting...
