= General Hodges =

General Hodges may refer to:

- Courtney Hodges (1887–1966), U.S. Army general
- Ben Hodges (born 1955), U.S. Army lieutenant general
- Harry Foote Hodges (1860–1929), U.S. Army major general
- Henry Clay Hodges Jr. (1860–1963), U.S. Army major general
- Henry C. Hodges (1831–1917), U.S. Army brigadier general
- John Neal Hodges (1884–1965), U.S. Army brigadier general

== See also ==
- General Hodge (disambiguation)
