= Cedar Ridge High School (North Carolina) =

American public school in North Carolina

Location
- 1125 New Grady Brown School Road; Hillsborough, North Carolina 27278; United States; 36°03′09″N 79°07′32″W

Information
- Type: Public
- Established: 2002 (24 years ago)
- School district: Orange County Schools
- Superintendent: Dr. Danielle Jones
- CEEB code: 341871
- Principal: Dr. Anna Hipps
- Teaching staff: 47.28 (on an FTE basis)
- Enrollment: 1,148 (2024–2025)
- Student to teacher ratio: 24.28
- Colors: Dark red and silver
- Nickname: Red Wolves
- Website: www.orangecountyfirst.com/crhs

Cedar Ridge High School is a school in Hillsborough, North Carolina. It is one of two high schools in the Orange County Schools.

The school opened in 2002, in order to help relieve overcrowding at nearby Orange High School. It serves the southern half of Hillsborough and almost all of Orange County south of I-85 except Chapel Hill and Carrboro, which are served by Chapel Hill-Carrboro City Schools. Cedar Ridge High School is a member of the North Carolina High School Athletic Association (NCHSAA) and is classified as a 5A school.

== Demographics ==
The demographic breakdown of the 1,020 students enrolled in 2018–19 was:

- Male – 50.8%
- Female – 49.2%
- Asian/Pacific islanders – 2.1%
- Black – 9.2%
- Hispanic – 30.2%
- White – 54.5%
- Multiracial – 3.7%

32.0% of the students were eligible for free or reduced-cost lunch.

== Notable alumni ==
- Trenton Gill, NFL punter, played collegiately at NC State
