= Petrel Peak =

Petrel Peak (54°16′S 36°32′W) is a peak, 630 m, standing at the north side of Hodges Glacier, 1 nautical mile (1.9 km) northwest of Grytviken, South Georgia. Surveyed by the SGS in the period 1951–57. The name was proposed by J. Smith of the Falkland Islands Dependencies Survey (FIDS) in 1958, following glaciological investigations as part of the IGY. Petrel Peak is named for the whale-catcher Petrel, belonging to the Compania Argentina de Pesca at Grytviken, and for the snow petrels which nest on the higher rocks of the peak.
