= Orange High School (North Carolina) =

American public school in North Carolina

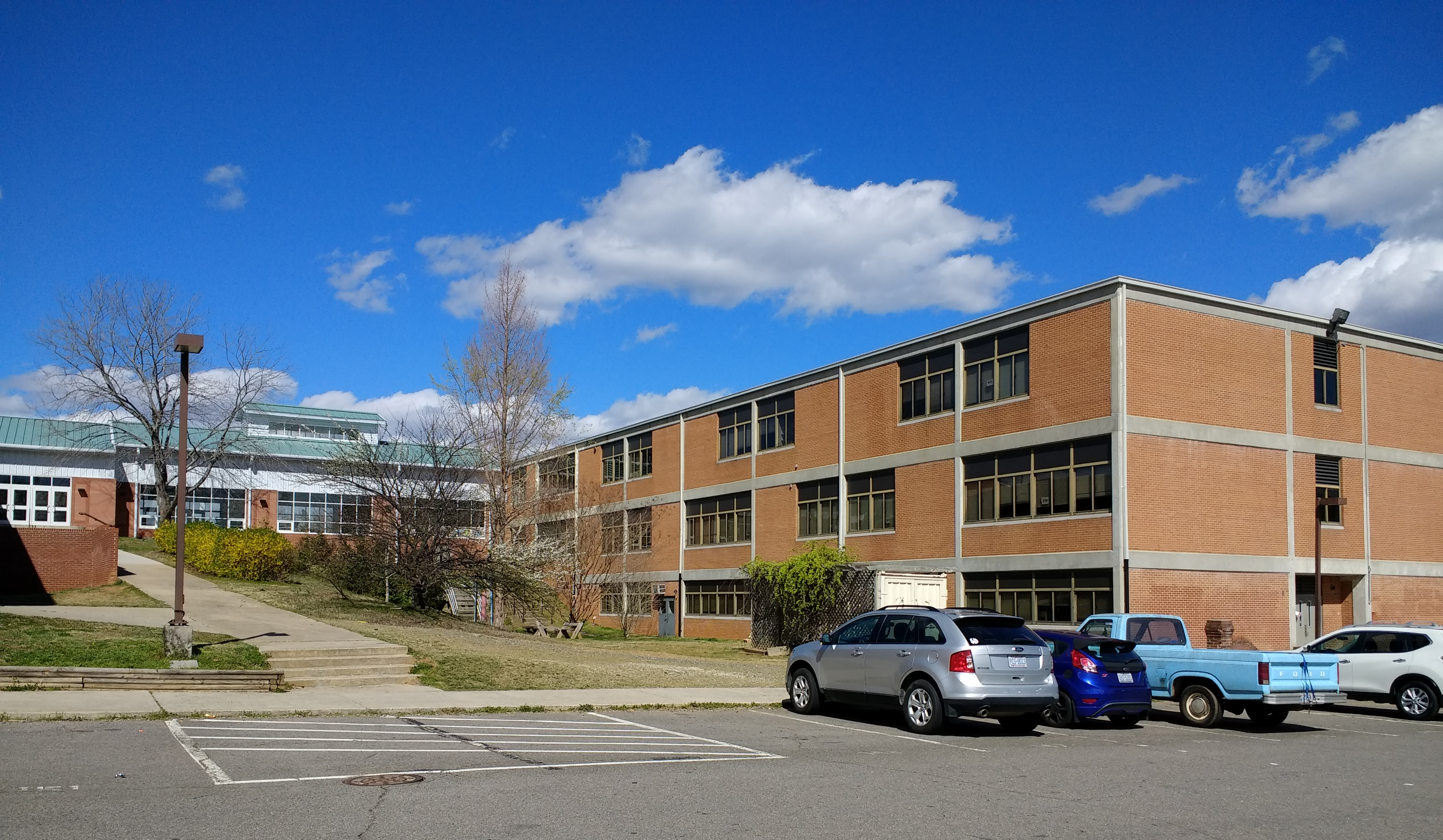
- Orange High School in March 2017

Location
- 500 Orange High School Road; Hillsborough, North Carolina 27278; United States; 36°05′23″N 79°05′41″W

Information
- Type: Public
- Established: 1963 (63 years ago)
- School district: Orange County Public Schools
- Superintendent: Todd Wirt
- CEEB code: 341875
- Principal: Jason Johnson
- Staff: 77.27 (FTE)
- Enrollment: 1,220 (2023-2024)
- Student to teacher ratio: 15.79
- Colors: Orange and black
- Song: Washington and Lee Swing, performed by the OHS panther regiment marching band
- Mascot: Panther
- Nickname: Orange Panther
- Newspaper: Panther Prowl
- Information: (919) 732-6133
- Website: orangecountyfirst.com/ohs

Orange High School is a high school in the northern area of Orange County, North Carolina, United States.

== Students and faculty ==
Founded in 1963, Orange High School educates over 1000 students in the northern half of Orange County–generally, the northern half of Hillsborough and all of the county north of I-85. It was the district's sole high school until Cedar Ridge High School opened in 2002 and the OCS Online Academy opened in 2021.

Like most high schools, Orange High serves grades 9 through 12 offering academic, co-curricular, career and technical, and extracurricular opportunities.

The faculty for the North Carolina school includes 79 licensed classroom teachers, four school counselors, 15 support & office staff, two associate principals, one principal, and 13 teachers for exceptional children. Nine of the teachers National Board Certified Teachers, and over 50 percent of staff hold master's degrees.

In Spring of 2007, it was announced that Jeff Dishmon would not be returning as principal of Orange High for the 2007–2008 school year, where he would be moved to a Central Office position. Roy Winslow became principal, until January 2010 when it was announced that he would be moving to a school in Granville County. Stephen Scroggs, a former Chapel Hill-Carrboro City Schools Assistant Superintendent, was assigned the position of interim principal until a new principal was found. One of the assistant principals, Armond Hankins, was selected for the position, effective July 1, 2010. Hankins was demoted in 2012, and former Gravelly Hill Middle School principal Jason Johnson replaced him.

== Athletics ==
Orange High School is a member of the North Carolina High School Athletic Association (NCHSAA) and are classified as a 5A school. It is a part of the Big Seven 4A/5A conference. Orange used to compete in the NCHSAA 4A classification (North Carolina's former highest classification for high school athletics) before losing enrollment with the opening of Cedar Ridge High School in 2002.

Orange High School offers the following sports for its students:

- Baseball
- Basketball
- Cheerleading
- Cross country
- Golf
- Football
- Lacrosse
- Soccer
- Softball
- Swimming
- Tennis
- Track and field
- Volleyball
- Wrestling

=== Baseball ===
Orange High School baseball finished the 2008 season as the NCHSAA 2A state champions, finishing with a record of 27–3.

=== Softball ===
The Orange softball team were the NCHSAA 3A state champions in 2017, finishing with a record of 26–3.

=== Wrestling ===
The Orange wrestling team has won five NCHSAA dual team wrestling state championships in 2005 (3A), 2008 (2A), 2009 (2A), 2011 (3A), 2012 (3A) and five state tournament team championships in 2008 (1A/2A), 2009 (1A/2A), 2012 (3A), 2013 (3A) and 2017 (3A).

== Shooting ==
On August 30, 2006, former student 18-year-old Alvaro Castillo murdered his father Rafael Castillo and then drove the family minivan to Orange High School, where he set off a cherry bomb and then opened fire with a 9mm Hi-Point 995 carbine and a sawed-off 12-gauge Mossberg 500 pump-action shotgun. When his carbine jammed, he was apprehended by a deputy sheriff assigned to the school and a retired highway patrol officer who taught driver's education. Two students were non-fatally injured in the attack. Despite entering a plea of not guilty by reason of insanity, on August 21, 2009, Castillo was found guilty following a three-week trial and sentenced to life in prison with no chance of parole.

== Notable alumni ==
- Kizzmekia Corbett, American viral immunologist
- Jermaine Hodge, former American Greco-Roman wrestler
- Ricardo Marsh, professional basketball player
- Hilda Pinnix-Ragland, business executive and philanthropist
- Scott Satterfield, college football head coach
- Alvis Whitted, former NFL wide receiver and current coach
- Bryse Wilson, MLB pitcher
- Payton Wilson, NFL linebacker
