= James Hodges =

James Hodges may refer to:

- James Hodges (mayor) (1822–1895), American politician and businessman
- James L. Hodges (1790–1846), delegate from Massachusetts in the United States House of Representatives
- James Hodges (1814–1879), builder and engineer who constructed the Pennyhill Park Hotel
- Jim Hodges (born 1956), governor of South Carolina from 1999 until 2003
- Jim Hodges (artist) (born 1957), New York-based installation artist

== See also ==
- James Hodge (disambiguation)
