= Charles Hodges (disambiguation) =

Charles Hodges (born 1947) is an American organist and songwriter.

Charles Hodges may also refer to:

- Charles D. Hodges (1810–1884), U.S. representative from Illinois
- Charles E. Hodges (1892–1968), American politician, president of the West Virginia Senate
- Charles Howard Hodges (1764–1831), British painter
- Charles L. Hodges (1847–1911), officer in the United States Army
- Chas Hodges (1943–2018), English singer

== See also ==
- Charles Hodge (1797–1878), Presbyterian theologian
- Charlie Hodge (disambiguation)
