= Frederick Douglass Academy =

Public school in New York City

Coordinates: 40°49′27″N 73°56′12″W

Frederick Douglass Academy 1
- 2581 7th Avenue; New York, NY 10039

Information
- Type: Public (Screened) College Preparatory
- Motto: "Without Struggle There Is No Progress"
- Established: 1991
- School district: Community School District: 5
- Dean: Ms. Grant, Mr. Williams, Ms. Joyce
- Principal: Ayisha Fullerton
- Grades: 6 - 12
- Gender: Coeducational
- Colors: Maroon and Gold
- Athletics: Baseball, Basketball, Football, Fencing, Indoor Track, Lacrosse, Outdoor Track, Soccer, Tennis, Volleyball, Softball
- Athletics conference: PSAL
- Mascot: Lion
- Information: 212-491-4107
- Website: www.fda1harlem.org

Frederick Douglass Academy (also known as FDA) is a co-educational public school for grades 6-12 located in West Harlem, New York City. The school offers an SAT prep course program and a variety of Advanced Placement (AP) college courses that students can apply for starting in 10th grade. It is also one of the first high schools in Harlem to make wearing a uniform in a public school mandatory.

== History ==
Frederick Douglass Academy was created in 1991 by Lorraine Monroe (a former Deputy Chancellor of Instruction for the New York City Board of Education) and several other members of the New York City Board of Education. The founding principal was Monroe, who left in 1997 and was succeeded briefly by Dorothy Haime prior to the appointment of Gregory Hodge in 1997. Hodge remained in the position until his retirement in 2011, to be succeeded by Joseph Gates. Ayisha Fullerton became principal in 2017, replacing Joseph Gates who stepped down in June 2017.

== Academics ==
Frederick Douglass Academy is a college preparatory school that stresses academic achievement. It offers Advanced Placement courses which allows students to receive college credit. Some of these AP courses offered are:

- Psychology
- Biology
- Calculus AB
- Chemistry
- English Language and Composition
- English Literature and Composition
- European History
- French Language and Culture
- Micro-economics
- Physics C: Mechanics
- Spanish Language and Culture
- Statistics
- U.S. History
- Government & Politics

The school showed a 94% graduation rate giving FDA an "A" rating for College and Career Readiness on the 2012-2013 NYC Progress Report. It was a Daily News "top high school," in 2012.

== Extracurricular activities ==
Frederick Douglass Academy offers a few extracurricular activities ranging from an anime interest club to robotics. As of 2010, it offers the following among many other activities:

- Anime club
- Chess club
- History club
- Yearbook committee
- Buildon - This club (not created at FDA) focuses on local community service simultaneously with building schools in third-world nations such as Nicaragua and Ghana. On average, two or three students go abroad to these countries to help build the schools from scratch with money raised locally.
- Robotics - The inception of the school's FIRST Robotics Competition team in 2005 proved to be remarkable as the team finished in second place, displacing Stuyvesant High School and Bronx Science.
- School newspaper club

In 2006 FDA students launched The North Star school newspaper named after Frederick Douglass' newspaper.

== Varsity sports ==
- Football (M)
- Baseball (M)
- Basketball
- Indoor Track
- Lacrosse
- Outdoor Track
- Soccer (M)
- Softball (F)
- Tennis
- Taekwondo
- Fencing

== Partnerships ==
Frederick Douglass Academy's business partnerships include a variety of companies.

- HBO—The HBO mentoring program in FDA is an important asset to the school as it pairs high school students with HBO employees. In such manner, students gain insight to the professional world and receive advice such as how to write a resume or prepare for a college interview.
- Gap—The Little Shop of Scholars is FDA's school store—affiliated with Gap—which has everything from school uniforms to holiday gifts. The merchandise are gifts from Gap. The monetary proceeds go to graduating seniors in the form of scholarships.
- Harlem Children Society—This program partners FDA with Harlem Children Society—indirectly with Memorial Sloan-Kettering Cancer Center, the renowned cancer research institution. FDA students part of the program are able to be paired up with research mentors and are placed in research labs. Students take part in research ranging from nutrition to neurology. This program gives students who have an interest in science and medicine a great hands-on experience. Students involved in the past have been able to assume important roles in the lab as they have done tasks ranging from performing perfusions on lab mice to DNA ligations.
- Columbia University—As a college preparatory school, FDA spends a great deal of effort in providing SAT-prep courses catered mostly to juniors and seniors. With Columbia University, the school has a Let's Get Ready chapter. The program has been proven effective as it generally increases the students' SAT scores by placing the students in appropriate groups that target the students' specific problems, be it math or the verbal section.
- The New York Times—Every year a senior is offered a scholarship for outstanding scholarly articles awarded by a New York Times affiliate. Thus, seniors are motivated each year to compile their most outstanding written pieces in hope of winning the prestigious scholarship.
- Sullivan & Cromwell—This partnership is a very fundamental one given that the law-firm company is the main provider of Advanced Placement-course textbooks.
- Futures and Options—This nonprofit organization serves as an umbrella to several other programs in the school as it offers "paid semester internships at private sector and not-for-profit sites in the city."

== Legacy ==
Based on the success of Monroe's original model, the New York City school system created seven other "Frederick Douglass Academies" around the city:

- Frederick Douglass Academy II Secondary School (Manhattan) (H.S. M860)
- Frederick Douglass Academy III Secondary School (Bronx) (H.S. X517)
- Frederick Douglass Academy IV Secondary School (Brooklyn) (H.S. K393)
- Frederick Douglass Academy V Middle School (Bronx) (M.S. X273)
- Frederick Douglass Academy VI High School (Queens) (H.S. 260)
- Frederick Douglass Academy VII High School (Brooklyn) (H.S. 514)
- Frederick Douglass Academy VIII Middle School (Brooklyn) (M.S. 452)

== Notable people ==
=== Staff ===
- Gregory Hodge, principal
- Simon Cataldo, special education math teacher

=== Alumni ===
- Kai Cenat, online streamer and YouTuber
- Alpha Diallo, basketball player
- Desi Rodriguez, basketball player
