= Florence Hood =

Australian violinist (1880–1968)

Florence Hood (14 Oct 1880–1968) was a violinist from Melbourne, Victoria who married and moved to Canada, where she was a member of the Montreal String Quartet.

== History ==
Florence was born in Melbourne, a grand-daughter of John Hood M.P. and the youngest daughter of (later Sir) Joseph Henry Hood (1 June 1846 – 28 January 1922), judge of the Supreme Court of Victoria, and his wife Georgina, née McKee, later Lady Hood OBE (c. 1849 – 13 August 1937), and brought up at their large home "Helenslea", in Caulfield, Victoria.

She studied piano and violin under Hermann T. Schrader, whom she remembered with affection and gratitude. Professor Schrader later said of her, with his typical modesty:

"... she came to me as a young girl, and made such amazingly rapid progress with her piano studies that before very long I launched her upon the violin. Then, within a few years, I realised that I could not teach her any more. She knew as much as I did ..."

She went on to study in London under August Wilhelmj, who tutored Aylmer Buesst. By 1906 she was a featured soloist at George Marshall-Hall's celebrated concerts in the Melbourne Town Hall That September she and Marshall-Hall left on the NDL Scharnhorst for Europe, where she furthered her studies under Otakar Ševčík (teacher of Jan Kubelik), then served as his assistant teacher. In 1911 she returned to Australia, where she made her Sydney debut with the Sydney Symphony Orchestra. In 1913 she returned to Ševčík's Meister Schule in Vienna, and was there at the outbreak of war. During the Great War she entertained troops in concert with pianist Una Bourne and sopranos Mona McCaughey and Kate Benda. A 1917 appearance at the London Coliseum with Bourne and Estelle Ward was well received. Hood and Bourne went on to Prague and Paris. She and Una Bourne were champions of British composers: in 1920 their Continental concerts featured violin sonatas by Elgar and Dunhill.

Sometime perhaps around 1920 she married Robert H. Bryson of Montreal. He bought for her a 1717 Stradivarius violin, for which he paid £5000 sometime perhaps around 1930.

She was a member, with her husband, of the first incarnation of the Montreal String Quartet, which flourished between 1925 and 1928), which comprised Florence Hood and Mary Izard, violins, Robert H. Bryson, viola, and Yvette Lamontagne, later Jean Belland, 'cello, and gave concerts in the Windsor Hall.

She returned to Australia in 1933 for concert tours and radio broadcasts, one of which featured the first Australian performance of a sonata by Healey Willan.

The Florence Hood-Bryson trophy for strings at the Toronto Kiwanis Festival was named for her.
