= John Hodge =

John Hodge may refer to:

- John R. Hodge (1893–1963), United States Army officer
- John E. Hodge (1914–1996), American chemist
- John Hodge (politician) (1855–1937), British politician
- John Hodge (engineer) (1929–2021), British-born aerospace engineer
- John Hodge (screenwriter) (born 1964), British screenwriter
- John Hodge (English footballer) (born 1969), English footballer
- John Hodge (Scottish footballer), played for Manchester United and Stenhousemuir
- John Hodge (police commissioner), colonial police officer in Nigeria
- Jack Hodge (1906–1996), English footballer

== See also ==
- John Hodges (disambiguation)
