= Trenton Gill =

American football player (born 1999)

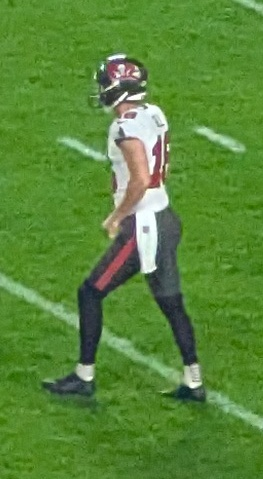
- Gill with the Tampa Bay Buccaneers in 2024

Profile
- Position: Punter

Personal information
- Born: March 5, 1999 (age 27); Hillsborough, North Carolina, U.S.
- Listed height: 6 ft 4 in (1.93 m)
- Listed weight: 219 lb (99 kg)

Career information
- High school: Cedar Ridge (Hillsborough, North Carolina)
- College: NC State (2017–2021)
- NFL draft: 2022: 7th round, 255th overall pick

Career history
- Chicago Bears (2022–2023); Denver Broncos (2024)*; Tampa Bay Buccaneers (2024); Atlanta Falcons (2025)*
- * Offseason or practice squad member only

Awards and highlights
- First-team All-ACC (2021); Third-team All-ACC (2019)

Career NFL statistics as of 2024
- Punts: 160
- Punting yards: 7,295
- Average punt: 45.6
- Inside 20: 47
- Stats at Pro Football Reference

Trenton Gill (born March 5, 1999) is an American professional football punter. He played college football at NC State. He has previously played for the Chicago Bears and the Tampa Bay Buccaneers.

== Early life ==
Gill was born on March 5, 1999, in Hillsborough, North Carolina and attended Cedar Ridge High School, where he played soccer and tennis in addition to kicking and punting on the football team. His father is English and his mother is Canadian.

== College career ==
Gill was a member of the NC State Wolfpack for five seasons. He redshirted his true freshman season and was the backup to A. J. Cole III as a redshirt freshman. Gill took over as the Wolfpack's punter as a redshirt sophomore and set a school record with 47.6 yards per punt on 56 punts and was named third-team All-Atlantic Coast Conference (ACC). He was named first-team All-ACC as a redshirt senior.

== Professional career ==
Pre-draft measurables
Height	Weight	Arm length	Hand span	Wingspan
6 ft 4 3/8 in (1.94 m)	220 lb (100 kg)	31 1/4 in (0.79 m)	9 1/4 in (0.23 m)	6 ft 4 1/4 in (1.94 m)
All values from NFL Combine

=== Chicago Bears ===
Gill was selected with the 255th overall pick in the seventh round of the 2022 NFL draft by the Chicago Bears.

On September 11, 2022, in a game against the San Francisco 49ers, Gill was penalized for using a towel to wipe off the field.

On May 1, 2024, Gill was waived by the Bears, days after the team selected Tory Taylor in the 2024 NFL draft.

=== Denver Broncos ===
On May 15, 2024, Gill was signed by the Denver Broncos. He was brought on to compete against the incumbent punter, Riley Dixon. On August 26, the Broncos retained Dixon and waived Gill.

=== Tampa Bay Buccaneers ===
On September 24, 2024, Gill signed with the Tampa Bay Buccaneers practice squad. He was promoted to the active roster on October 23. On December 2, Gill was waived.

=== Atlanta Falcons ===
On January 1, 2026, Gill was signed to the Atlanta Falcons' practice squad. He signed a reserve/future contract with the Falcons on January 5. On April 27, Gill was released by the Falcons.
