= Hodge =

Hodge may refer to:

== Places ==
=== United States ===
- Hodge, California, an unincorporated community
- Hodge, Louisiana, a village
- Hodge, Missouri, an unincorporated community
- The Hodge Building, the historic name of the Begich Towers in Whittier, Alaska

=== Other ===
- Hodge Escarpment, Edith Ronne Land, Antarctica

== Other uses ==
- Hodge (surname)
- Hodge baronets, two titles in the Baronetage of the United Kingdom, one extinct
- Hodge 301, a star cluster in the Tarantula Nebula
- Hodge (cat), Dr. Samuel Johnson's cat
- Hodge, pseudonym of Roger Squires, crossword compiler

== See also ==
- A list of mathematical concepts named after W. V. D. Hodge
- Hodges (disambiguation)
