= General Hodge =

General Hodge may refer to:

- Sir Edward Hodge (1810–1894), British Army general
- George Baird Hodge (1828–1892), Confederate States Army acting brigadier general
- James L. Hodge (born c. 1954), U.S. Army major general
- John R. Hodge (1893–1963), U.S. Army general

== See also ==
- General Hodges (disambiguation)
