= Samuel D. Hodge Jr. =

Samuel D. Hodge, Jr. is an American professor and author with a specialty involving the intersection of law and medicine. He teaches law, anatomy, and forensics at Temple University and serves as a mediator and neutral arbitrator for the Dispute Resolution Institute.

== Education ==
Hodge received his J.D. from the Beasley School in 1974 and is a 1979 alumnus of the Graduate Legal Studies Division of the law school.

Hodge has also had post-graduate mediation training at the Straus Institute for Dispute Resolution at Pepperdine University School of Law and in anatomy from the Temple University Katz School of Medicine.

== Career ==
Hodge has been a professor at Temple University for more than 45 years. He has received the Temple University Great Teacher Award, the Musser Leadership Award in Teaching, the Best Instructor Award, the Crystal Apple Award for Teaching, the John DeAngelo Award for Innovative Use of Technology, John Topoleski Memorial Award for Outstanding Instruction, the Stauffer Alumni Award for Outstanding Faculty Service, the Alumni Board of Managers'Distinguished Faculty Award, the Provost Award for Innovation in Teaching in the General Education, and the Innovation in Teaching Technology Award. He was named a Master Teacher by the American Academy of Legal Studies in Business and The Academy of Teachers. His teaching style has been the subject of stories in The New York Times, the Philadelphia Daily News, the Philadelphia Inquirer, the Chronicle of Higher Education, National Public Radio, and television.

Hodge lectures internationally for The Professional Education Group on anatomy and other medical-related topics to audiences of lawyers, judges, physicians, governmental agencies, and insurance professionals. He has conducted more than 500 programs throughout the United States and Canada. His presentation "Anatomy for Lawyers" was awarded the Outstanding Achievement Award – Best Program category from the international Association for Continuing Legal Education (ACLEA).

Hodge's research focus is on the intersection of medicine and law. He is one of the most published scholars on medical/legal matters in the United States and has authored more than 700 publications in a variety of law reviews and medical and professional journals. Hodge has also authored eight medical and two law-related texts and numerous supplements to those publications. His text, Anatomy for Litigators received the outstanding achievement award and he is the recipient of the Excellence in Policy Research Award. He is on the Editorial Board of the Practical Lawyer, a publication of the American Law Institute, and was the legal reviewer for the book, James Szalados, “Law and Ethics in Neurocritical Care - A Practical Guide for Managing Clinical Complexities, Neurocritical Care Society. Professor Hodge has also written chapters in "Orthopedic Evaluation and Expert Testimony", John Wiley and Sons as well as "The Direct Examination of a Medical Expert", Orthopedic Evaluation and Expert Testimony, John Wiley and Sons.

Hodge is a litigator who handles complex personal injury and trucking accident litigation. He has been named a top attorney in Pennsylvania on multiple occasions.

== Books ==
- “Anatomy and Physiology for Legal Professionals,” Book, PBI Press.
- “Law and American Society, Third Edition, McGraw Hill.
- “Legal and Regulatory Environment of Business, 4th Edition, McGraw Hill
- "Head Trauma and Traumatic Brain Injuries," American Bar Association
- "The Forensic Autopsy,” American Bar Association.
- "The Spine,” American Bar Association.
- " Clinical Anatomy for Lawyers,” American Bar Association.
- "Anatomy for Litigators, Second Edition, American Bar Institute, American Bar Association.
- "Clinical Anatomy for Attorneys, The Amerasian Law Institute of the American Bar Association.

Other books have been published by John Wiley & Sons, McGraw-Hill Education and the American Law Institute - American Bar Association.
