= Henry Hodges (jurist) =

Australian judge (1844–1919)

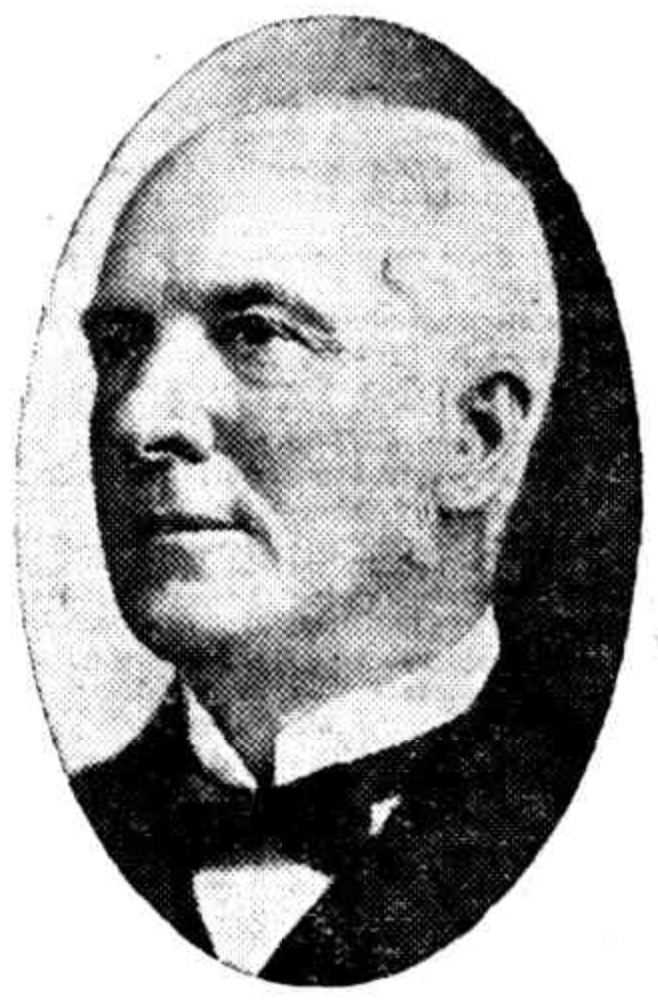
Sir Henry Edward Hodges

Sir Henry Edward Agincourt Hodges (October 1844 – 8 August 1919) was senior puisne judge of the Supreme Court of Victoria, Australia.

== Early life ==
Hodges was born in Liverpool, England, the son of Henry and Mary Hodges. They left for Australia when he was around ten years of age. He was educated at either Melbourne Grammar School or Church of England Grammar School and Melbourne University, where he was one of the first enrolled at Trinity College and graduated with a B.A. He worked as a tutor for the families of, successively, Premier James Francis and Chief Justice William Stawell.

== Career ==
Hodges was admitted as a barrister in 1875. For several years practiced extensively, and was very successful. In 1889 a position on the judiciary became available he was appointed as a puisne judge to the Supreme Court Bench.

With the exception of Sir Thomas à Beckett, he was longer on the bench than any other judge.

Hodges was knighted in June 1918.

He died at "Dreamthorpe", a magnificent summer residence on the slopes of Mount Macedon that he established.

His remains were interred at the Boroondara cemetery.

For some time there had been only four judges on the Victorian Supreme Court: (Sir William Irvine (chief judge), Hodges, Hood, and Cussen), when the law provided for six, and in 1919 two additional judges were appointed, W. J. Schutt and F. W. Mann. They took their seats shortly after Hodges' death.

== Other interests ==
- Hodges was an active Anglican churchgoer and for many years chancellor of the Diocese of Melbourne.
- He was first president of the Old Melburnians Society.
- While on holiday in London in 1901 he represented Australia at a conference called to establish an Imperial Court of Final Appeal.

== Family ==
Hodges married Margaret Knox ( – ) in 1878. She was a daughter of Melbourne solicitor George Knox and sister of William Knox MHR. Their children included:

- George Agincourt Hodges, a surgeon.
- younger son Capt. E. Norman Hodges MC, a barrister, died July 1918 of pneumonia while on active service during the Great War.
- Margaret Hodges (died 1932) married Air Commodore John David Boyle, son of the Earl of Glasgow, on 9 December 1913
- Mary Eirene Hodges (1879–1951) married Lieut. (Howard) Clifton Brown on 14 July 1903.

On 4 December 1909 he married again, to Alice Belinda Chirnside (died 23 November 1942), widow of Robert Chirnside of Carranballac Station, near Skipton.

=== Dr. Girlie C. Hodges ===
Hodges' granddaughter was Dr. George "Girlie" Chapple Hodges (1904-1999), whose mother was Bessie Hodges née Chapple, and whose father was Hodges' son George Agincourt Hodges. Girlie Hodges qualified with a Master of Surgery in Victoria in 1939, making her the first woman in Victoria to receive the degree. She also played Hockey for Australia at international competitions.
