= Harlem Children Society =

Nonprofit organization

- Founded: June 5, 2000; 25 years ago
- Founder: Dr. Sat (Satyajit) Bhattacharya
- Type: Educational, Scientific
- Purpose: Supporting Under-Privileged Students through Science
- Region served: Worldwide
- Method: Mentors, Information, Stipend
- Website: www.harlemchildrensociety.org

Harlem Children Society (HCS) is a non-profit organization that arranges for students from under-resourced and under-served communities to be placed as interns at academic research labs during a summer research program. In addition to the lab experience, students receive a stipend.

Participating institutions include Memorial Sloan-Kettering Cancer Center, Weill Cornell Graduate School of Medical Sciences, New York University, and Columbia University.

Students undertake their own research, which is presented during a street science fair in their own community, under the guidance of scientists. The students are able to pursue their scientific investigations during the following school semester in an after-school program. Additionally, these students attend weekly lectures on a variety of topics ranging from incorporating science into communities to financing a college education, while also having the option to visit college campuses and to receive help preparing for the SATs.

== History and origins ==
Dr. Sat (Satyajit) Bhattacharya founded HCS on June 5, 2000. By 2010, the program had expanded to 12 countries, serving more than 750 students. Of their mentees in the United States, as of 2010, 40% are African-American, 26% are of Hispanic descent, and 16% are Native Americans.

HCS aims to increase awareness in the sciences, medicine, engineering and mathematics. It provides an opportunity for under-privileged high school aged students throughout to world succeed academically as well as in all other aspects of their lives.

== Scope ==
HCS as of the 2013 serves about 60 students from over 15 schools doing hands-on science research with over 20 mentors in more than 10 reputed institutions.

The Program has three components: Students and research projects; seminars and training; and local, regional and national professional conferences and community science street fairs. Family involvement and post-program follow-up provide students with support to plan their futures and mediate the transitions—academic, emotional, and social—to college and post-academic pursuits.

Depending on their interests and availability of recruited mentors, students are matched with a mentor willing to commit to the summer program. These students enter the program at the beginning of the summer with an orientation, and spend about eight 25-hour weeks starting their research and some receive training in lab techniques and safety. During the academic year, a fraction of the participating students put in 12–24 hours each month at their internship sites and attend weekly seminars when made available.

A fraction of the students stay committed to the program for at least two years, and are requested to work as part of HCS staff by Bhattacharya as volunteer interns with an unfixed stipend every year.

== Highlights ==
The Harlem Children Society has had a number of accomplishments:

- Almost 80% of the program's participants in 2006 were first or second generation immigrants to the United States
- As of 2009, 100% of the US students enrolled in HCS internships attended college. Of those, over 20% went to Ivy League schools.
