= Sandra Hodge =

American basketball player (born 1962)

Sandra Hodge (born July 31, 1962) is a retired basketball player who played for the University of New Orleans and Harlem Globetrotters. With New Orleans during the 1980s, her team won the 1983 National Women's Invitational Tournament. Hodge played in 107 games and had a top ten NCAA Division I points record with 2,860 points. After playing basketball in Europe for a few years, Hodge became one of the first four women to join the Globetrotters.

During her tenure from 1987 to 1993, Hodge played in over 300 games with the Globetrotters. Outside of Harlem, Hodge was drafted by the Women's American Basketball Association and American Basketball League but did not make their rosters. Hodge was inducted into the University of New Orleans Hall of Fame in 1989.

== Early life and education ==
In the early 1960s, Hodge was born in Clinton, Mississippi. She was interested in basketball while completing her primary education. As a child, Hodge played at the AAU Junior Olympic Games when she was eleven. In 1978, she competed at the Mississippi girls' high school basketball tournament as a Class AA athlete with Clinton. She had 1,538 points before leaving Clinton in 1980.

From 1980 to 1984, Hodge played college basketball at the University of New Orleans. During her time with New Orleans, Hodge appeared in 107 games and scored 2,860 points. In 1983, Hodge won the National Women's Invitational Tournament with New Orleans. With 820 points during the 1982–83 season, Hodge set the record for most season points at New Orleans. Leading up to 2020, her season points record had remained for over thirty years. With 2,860 career points, Hodge's record remained in the top ten for the most points scored in NCAA Division I history between the 1980s and early 2000s. In 2019, her NCAA points record dropped to the top twenty five.

== Career ==
In 1984, Hodge was drafted by the Atlanta Comets to play in the Women's American Basketball Association but did not make the roster. From 1984 to 1985, Hodge played basketball in Europe. During this time period, Hodge was invited to try out for the Harlem Globetrotters in 1985. She officially became a member of the Globetrotters in 1987 and started playing with them in South America. Her selection made Hodge one of the first four women to join the Globetrotters.

After playing in over 300 games with the Globetrotters, Hodge ended her six and a half year career with the team in 1993. Before resuming her basketball playing career in 1997, Hodge was a high school coach and athletics head in New Orleans. During the 1997 American Basketball League draft, Hodge was selected in the fourth round by the New England Blizzard. While trying to gain a position on the Blizzard's roster, Hodge injured her hamstring and withdrew from training camp.

== Awards and honors ==
During high school, Hodge was named All-Little Dixie Conference during 1979. The following year, she received the Most Valuable Player award as part of the All-LDC South Division team. In 1980, she was an All-State player for the Mississippi Sports Writers Association and an All-American for Parade.

In 1989, Hodge joined the University of New Orleans Hall of Fame. That year, her jersey was retired by New Orleans. Between 1981 and 1983, Hodge received consecutive Outstanding Female Amateur Athlete, New Orleans awards from the Allstate Sugar Bowl. She joined their Greater New Orleans Sports Hall of Fame during 1995.
