= Robert Hodge =

Robert or Bob Hodge may refer to:

- Robert Hodge (Australian politician) (1866–1924), member of the Queensland Legislative Assembly
- Robert Hermon-Hodge, 1st Baron Wyfold (1851–1937), known until 1902 as Robert Hodge, British Conservative MP between 1886 and 1918
- Robert Hodge (cricketer) (1914–1994), Scottish cricketer and badminton player
- Bob Hodge (linguist) (born 1940), Australian linguist, professor at the University of Western Sydney
- Robert Hodge (footballer) (fl. 1923–24), Scottish footballer
