= John Hodge (police commissioner) =

John Hodge was a colonial police officer who became Nigeria's Inspector-General of Police in 1962, he was the last expatriate to lead Nigeria's police force. Hodge began his career within the British colonial service. In Nigeria, he worked in all three regions in the country before retiring in 1964.

== Life ==
Hodge, the son of missionaries was born in Motihari, India. He started work as a colonial constabulary in Jamaica in 1931, he came to Nigeria in 1935 to become an Assistant Superintendent. In 1946, he led a special crime unit to investigate a case of murders relating to the Ekpe society in Southeastern Nigeria. Hodge was a senior police superintendent and had 95 rank and file policemen within his team. Hodge gradually rose through the ranks. He was deputy commissioner, Northern region, Kaduna in 1953, two years later he was posted to Enugu to take charge as the regional police commissioner. In 1960, he became Deputy Inspector-General of police, a position he held until is appointment as commander of the 23,000 Nigerian police force in 1962.
