= James Hodge =

James Hodge may refer to:

- James Hodge (administrator) (1876–1931), secretary of the Port Adelaide Football Club
- James Hodge (architect), Australian architect in practice with F. Kenneth Milne 1963-1973
- James Hodge (diplomat) (born 1943), British diplomat
- James Hodge (politician) (1879–1946), British Liberal politician and lawyer
- James L. Hodge (born c. 1954), United States Army general
- Jimmy Hodge (1890–1970), Scottish footballer

== See also ==
- James Hodges (disambiguation)
