= Andrea Hodge =

Colombian-born materials scientist

Andrea Maria Hodge
- Education: University of Nevada, Las Vegas
- Known for: Engineered nano materials research, Synthesis of micro- and nanoscale structures and structured grain boundaries
- Scientific career
- Workplaces: University of Southern California
- Doctoral advisor: Julia Weertman

Andrea Maria Hodge is a Colombian-born materials scientist and academic leader. She is the Department Chair of the Mork Family Department of Chemical Engineering & Materials Science at University of Southern California, and the Arthur B. Freeman Professor and Professor of Chemical Engineering and Materials Science and Aerospace and Mechanical Engineering. She is a leader in engineered nanomaterials research, with a focus on synthesis of micro- and nanoscale structures and structured grain boundaries.

== Early career and education ==
Hodge pursued undergraduate studies in the Mechanical Engineering department at the University of Nevada, Las Vegas, and completed her Ph.D. in 2002 in materials science at Northwestern University under the mentorship of Julia Weertman. She worked as a postdoctoral scholar, and then staff scientist, at Lawrence Livermore National Laboratory from 2002 until 2007.

== Research ==
Hodge's oversees the Hodge Materials Research Group, and her academic research efforts on nanoporous gold is most well known and cited.

== Academic leadership ==
Hodge has engaged in a variety of academic advisory appointments and STEM outreach activities. She is on the board of advisors for the mechanical engineering department at the University of California, Riverside, and the McCormick School of Engineering at Northwestern University. Hodge's is the 2020 recipient of the Julia and Johannes Weertman Educator Award, which recognizes her efforts towards improving education and educational leadership in materials science and metallurgy.
