= Joseph Henry Hood =

(1846–1922) judge

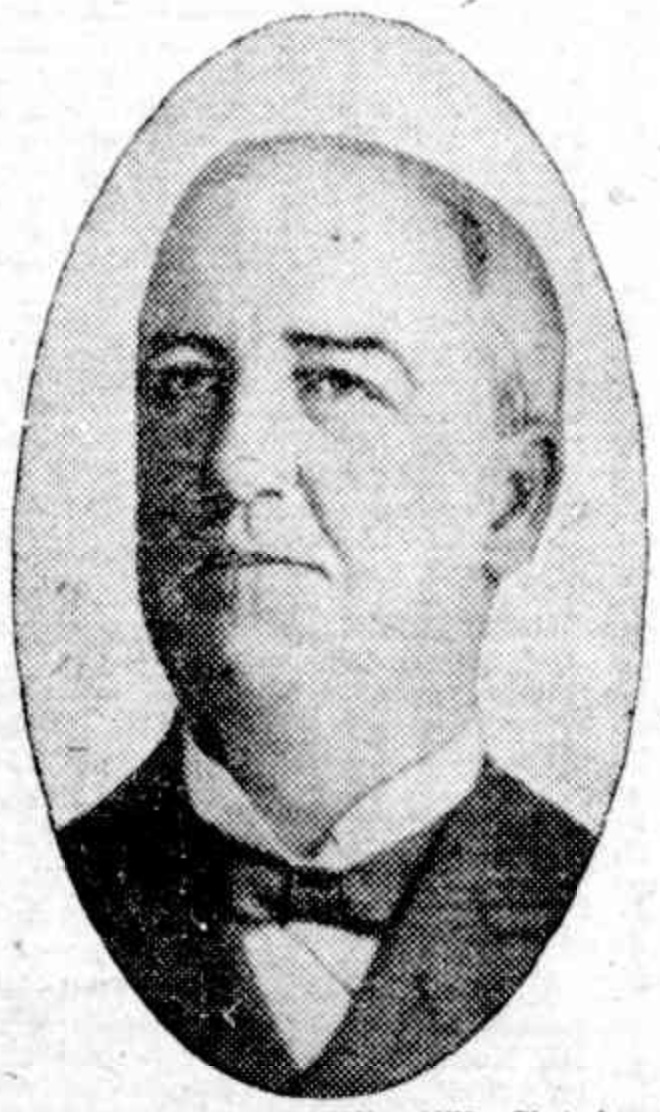
Joseph Henry Hood

Sir Joseph Henry Hood (1 June 1846 – 29 January 1922) was a puisne judge of the Supreme Court of Victoria from 1890 to 1921.

== Biography ==
Hood was born in Melbourne, a son of John Hood MLC and educated at Scotch College, of which he was dux in 1863, and had a brilliant scholastic career at Melbourne University, graduating BA in 1868, and was called to the Bar later that same year. After further studies he qualified MA and LLB. He had a large practice at the County Court, where he frequently had Frank Gavan Duffy as an adversary.

During the "land boom" of the 1880s he shared much litigation work with John Madden, Henry Hodges and J. L. Purves.

In 1890 he was appointed a judge of the Supreme Court, where he was noted for his quick wit and rapid understanding of matters before the court. He presided on the Mercantile Bank of Australia case in 1894.

In 1916 he was obliged on account of sickness to take several extended absences from court.

He was knighted on 3 June 1920.

He resigned from the bench in November 1921 due to poor health, having suffered a bout of pneumonia, and died a month later.

== Other interests ==
As a young man he enjoyed athletics and rowed for the University and Richmond rowing clubs. Later he wrote Rowing Notes for The Australasian.

== Family ==
Hood married Georgina McKee (c. 1849 – 13 August 1937) on 8 November 1869. They had one son and three daughters; the youngest, Florence Hood (1880–1968), was a noted violinist.
