= Charlie Hodge =

Charlie Hodge may refer to:

- Charlie Hodge (guitarist) (1934–2006), musician and guitarist for Elvis Presley
- Charlie Hodge (ice hockey) (1933–2016), National Hockey League goaltender

== See also ==
- Charles Hodge (1797–1878), principal of Princeton Theological Seminary, 1851–1878, Calvinist
- Charles Hodges (disambiguation)
