= Sandy Hodge =

Sandy Hodge may refer to:

- Sandy Hodge (Royal Navy officer) (1916–1997), recipient of the Empire Gallantry Medal, later exchanged for the George Cross
- Sandy Hodge (footballer), Scottish footballer
