= Hodges House (Taunton, Massachusetts) =

Historic house in Massachusetts, United States

- U.S. National Register of Historic Places
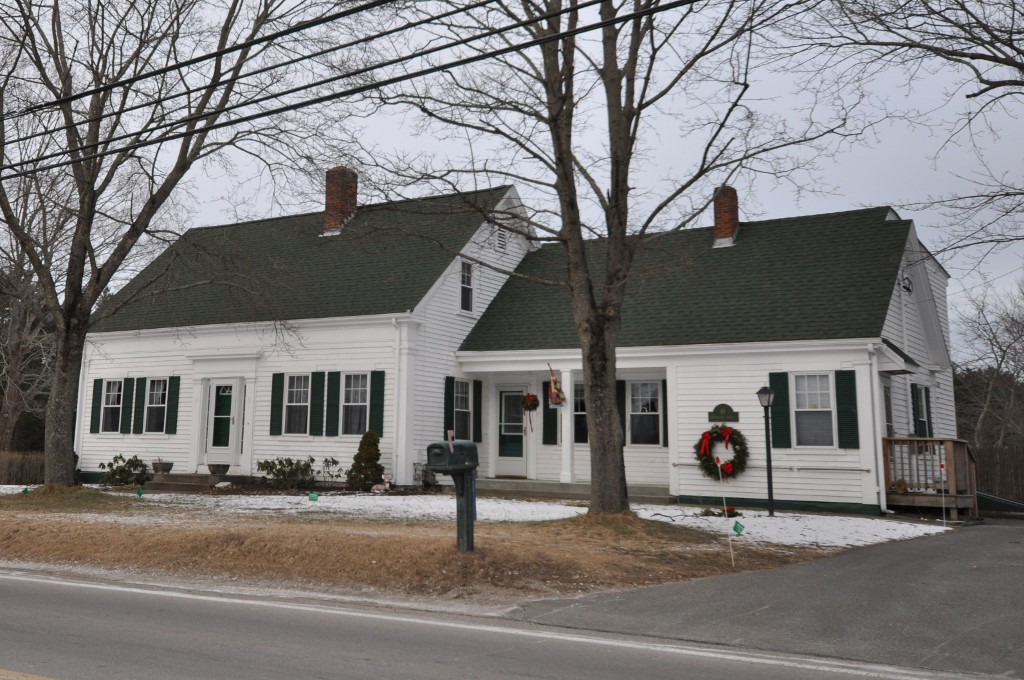

- Location within Massachusetts Location within the United States
- Location: 41 Worcester St., Taunton, Massachusetts
- Coordinates: 41°55′10″N 71°9′1″W
- Area: less than one acre
- Built: 1850
- Architectural style: Greek Revival
- MPS: Taunton MRA
- NRHP reference No.: 84002130
- Added to NRHP: July 5, 1984

The Hodges House is a historic house at 41 Worcester Street in Taunton, Massachusetts. Built about 1850, it is a well-preserved example of a Greek Revival Cape style house. It was listed on the National Register of Historic Places in 1984.

== Description and history ==
The Hodges House is located in a rural residential area of northwestern Taunton, on the northeast side of Worcester Street a short way south of its junction with Norton Road. It is a 1 1/2-story Cape style house, with a side gable roof and clapboarded exterior. It has a slightly off-center central chimney. The front is five bays wide, with two sash windows on either side of the entrance. The main entry is flanked by sidelight windows and pilasters, and is topped by an entablature. The building's corners are also pilastered, rising to an entablature that extends across the front at the eave. A 1 1/2-story ell extends to the right, set back from the main block. It also has a central chimney, and a recessed porch in its left side, supported by a square column. At the back of the porch is a secondary entrance on the left, and two sash windows to the right. To the right of the porch is a single sash window, set near the building corner.

The house was built about 1850, probably for someone in the Hodges family, who were major landowners in the area. It has retained virtually all of its original Greek Revival elements, and is one of the best preserved examples of this style in the city.

== See also ==
- National Register of Historic Places listings in Taunton, Massachusetts
