= Hodge's Coaches =

Coach operator in Berkshire, England

Hodge’s Coaches

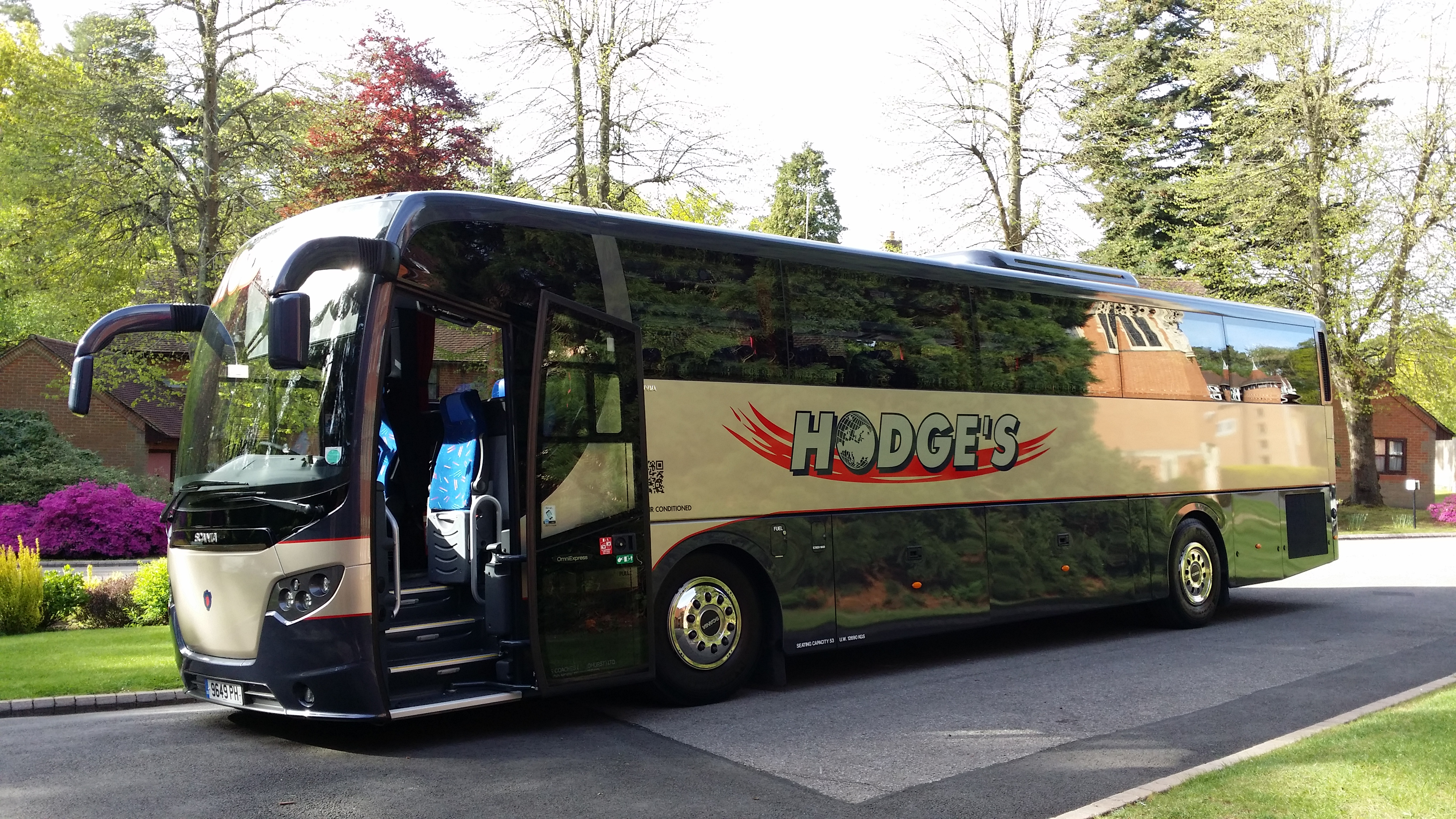
- Scania OmniExpress bodied Scania K-series, May 2015
- Founded: 1924; 102 years ago
- Headquarters: Sandhurst, UK
- Key people: Mark Hodge (Company Director); Martin Hodge (Company Director); Paul Hodge (Company Director)
- Services: Coach services
- Parent: Hodges Travel Limited
- Website: www.hodges-coaches.co.uk

Hodge's Coaches is a family owned coach operator based in Sandhurst, Berkshire.

== History ==
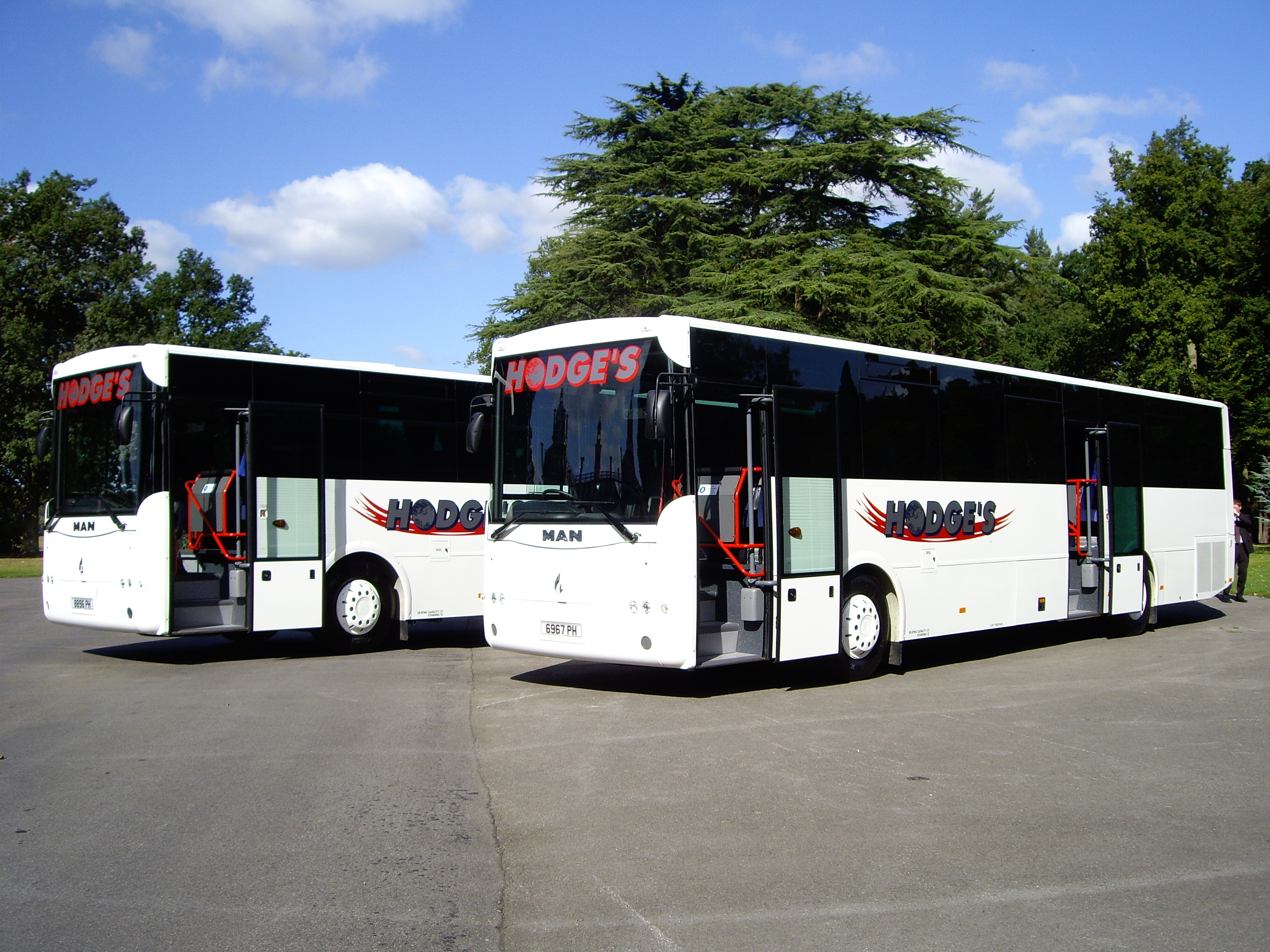
MAN A91s/Fast Concept Car Starter

The coach company was founded in 1924 by George Edward Hodge and still operates from the same site in Sandhurst, Berkshire. Hodge's Coaches is now the oldest coach company in Berkshire that is still owned and operated by the original family. Before operating coaches George Hodge operated trucks from the same site, Deepnell Garage which was next door to his brother Walter's shoe repair shop. History of Sandhurst. The company was taken over and modernised by the founders eldest son Peter R Hodge in 1962, he continued to operate successfully until retiring in 2001, the company is now owned and operated by three of his sons Mark, Martin and Paul Hodge. Mathew Hodge the first of fourth generation to run Hodge's is now in charge of the workshops.

== Fleet ==
The majority of Hodge's Coaches fleet are painted in a distinctive blue and gold livery, although there are several in plain white with just Hodge's logo's applied. The fleet consists of mainly Volvo and Scania vehicles although in 2011 three MAN Fast Buses were purchased. In 2013/2014 six Scanias will be delivered and a 70-seater Plaxton Leopard was also delivered in 2014.

== Services ==
Hodge's operates a 25 vehicle fleet of various sizes ranging from 16 to 70 seater vehicles, they specialise in corporate transport, private hire and home to school transport and club/society travel. The 57 seater MANs are a popular vehicle on school swimming contracts and as shuttle vehicles between venues, this may be due to the high seating capacity and the front and rear kerbside doors which allows for easier loading and unloading of passengers.
