= Jermaine Hodge =

American wrestler (born 1981)

Personal information
- Born: July 7, 1981 (age 45) Hillsborough, North Carolina, U.S.

Sport
- Country: United States
- Sport: Wrestling
- Event: Greco-Roman
- Club: U.S. Army WCAP
- Team: USA
- Coached by: Shon Lewis
Medal record
Men's Greco-Roman wrestling
Representing the United States
World Military Championships
Bronze medal – third place	2008 Split	55 kg
Pan American Championships
Silver medal – second place	2012 Colorado Springs	55 kg
Golden Grand Prix
Bronze medal – third place	2011 Szombathely	55 kg
Haparanda Cup
Gold medal – first place	2010 Haparanda	55 kg
Silver medal – second place	2007 Haparanda	55 kg

Jermaine Hodge (born July 7, 1981) is an American former Greco-Roman wrestler. As a member of the U.S. Army, Hodge competed as a Greco-Roman wrestler for the U.S. Army World Class Athlete Program, with championship tournament wins including the U.S. Open in 2009, Haparanda Cup in 2010, New York AC International Open in 2011, and the Dave Schultz Memorial International in 2016. Other notable placements include finishing second at the 2012 Pan American Championships and third at the 2011 Hungarian Grand Prix.

== Early life ==
Hodge attended Orange High School in Hillsborough, North Carolina. As a high school wrestler, he was a two-time NCHSAA state champion, winning the 1999 4A 119-pound title his junior year and the 2000 4A 125-pound title his senior year.

== Wrestling career ==
After joining the U.S. Army in 2004, Hodge was a member of the U.S. Army World Class Athlete Program, competing as a Greco-Roman wrestler. Hodge's championship tournament wins include winning the U.S. Open in 2009, the Haparanda Cup in 2010, the New York AC International Open in 2011, and the Dave Schultz Memorial International in 2016. Other notable placements include finishing second at the 2012 Pan American Championships and third at the 2011 Hungarian Grand Prix.

Hodge currently serves as a women's wrestling coach for the Army WCAP.

== Personal life ==
Hodge is also an avid elk hunter. He was the 2019 RMEF World Elk Calling Champion and the co-owner of Colorado High Altitude Hunters.
