= Andrew Hodge =

Andrew Hodge may refer to:

- Andrew Hodge (rugby league) (fl. 1990s), Australian rugby league footballer
- Andrew Triggs Hodge (born 1979), British rower

== See also ==
- Andrew Hodges (born 1949), British mathematician
