= Hodges Glacier =

Glacier in Antarctica

- Location within South Georgia Island
- Location: South Georgia
- Coordinates: 54°16′S 36°32′W
- Length: 1 nmi (2 km; 1 mi)
- Thickness: unknown
- Status: unknown

Hodges Glacier (54°16′S 36°32′W) is a small glacier 1 nautical mile (2 km) west of Grytviken, South Georgia, flowing from the south side of Petrel Peak to the foot of Mount Hodges. The name was recommended by the UK Antarctic Place-Names Committee and derives from association with Mount Hodges.

== See also ==
- List of glaciers in the Antarctic
- Glaciology
