= Zahrah Preble Hodge =

American writer

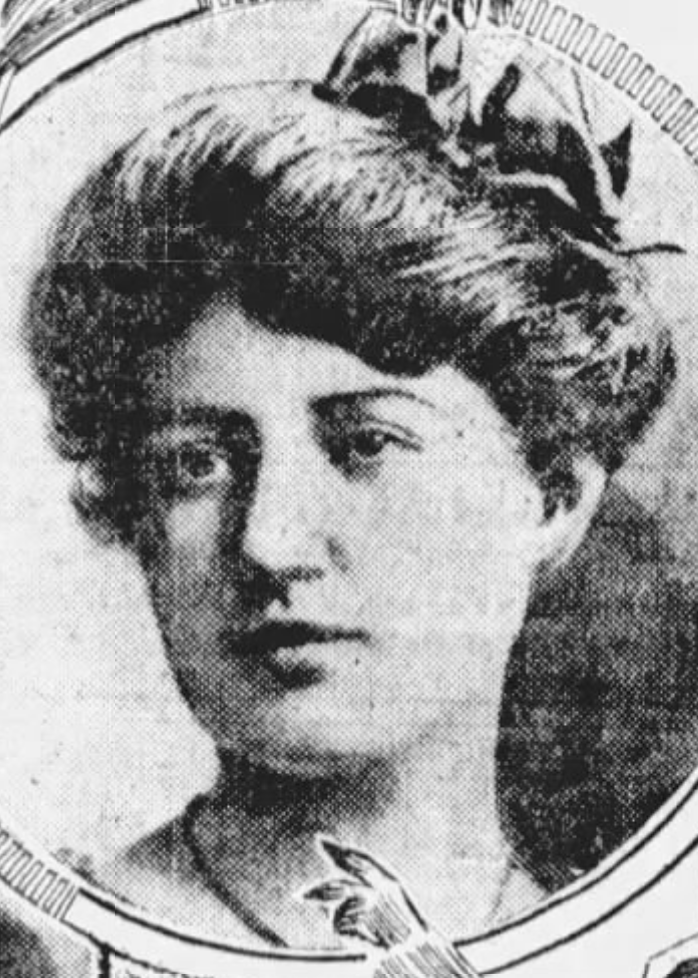
- Preble, from a 1907 newspaper
- Born: Ethel Leila Preble; August 17, 1880; San Francisco, California, U.S.
- Died: April 27, 1934 (age 53); South Pasadena, California, U.S.
- Other name: Zarah Ethel Preble
- Occupations: Writer, performer
- Spouse: Frederick Webb Hodge

Zahrah E. Preble Hodge (August 17, 1880 – April 27, 1934), born Ethel Leila Preble, was an American writer and performer. She wrote about the indigenous cultures of California and the American Southwest, and her dances, songs, and costumes were inspired by this interest.

== Early life and education ==
Preble was born in San Francisco, California, the daughter of Charles Sumner Preble and Ella Melana Thomson Preble. She studied music at the University of California, Berkeley, graduating in 1906. She was vice-president of the Theta Rho Club at Berkeley.

== Career ==
In 1907, Preble was one of the organizers of a "psychical research society" in Berkeley. Preble gave a joint recital with soprano Doris Schnabel at the Greek Theater in Berkeley in 1909, before an audience of six thousand. By 1909, Preble, who was white, danced and sang in beaded, fringed costumes with a feather headdress and blanket wrap in an impersonation meant to evoke indigenous cultures of California and the American Southwest. As part of her performing persona, she claimed a spiritual connection with Zuñi culture. She sang Indianist works by Charles Wakefield Cadman and Carlos Troyer. She performed in Berkeley and San Francisco, and at the Panama–Pacific International Exposition in 1915.

Preble was music director at a high school school in Escondido from 1917 to 1918. She worked at the Pala Indian Reservation School in 1919, and was active in the Camp Fire Girls, as a summer camp director and artistic advisor. From 1921 to 1922 she coached a high school drama program in the Panama Canal Zone. She moved to New York City in 1922, and made recordings on the Victor label in 1923. She accompanied Frederick Webb Hodge on an archaeological expedition to the Hawikuh Ruins in New Mexico, to study Zuñi music and domestic arrangements.

She returned to California with her husband in 1931, when he became director of the Southwest Museum.

== Publications ==
Preble wrote articles for popular and specialized publications, including The Oil Miller, The Forecast and Sportlife. She also wrote genre fiction, and a children's book, illustrated by her sister Donna Louisa Preble.

- "The Habit of Respecting Property Rights" (1923, article)
- "Home Education: Burbanking Your Child" (1923, article)
- "Home Education: Persistent Misbehavior in Small Children" (1924, article)
- "Catching Motion on the Wing" (1925, fiction)
- "Speaking of Men: Eight Lives for a Horse" (1926, fiction)
- "The Oldest Sport in America: The Stick-Race of the Indians of the Southwest" (1926, article)
- "The Twin Bracelets" (1927, fiction)
- "The Mexican of Tortillas and Frijoles" (1928, article)
- "The Dying Tree" (1932, a poem)
- "Marie Martinez: Indian Master Potter" (1933, article)
- Tomar of Siba: The Story of a Gabrielino Indian Boy of Southern California (1933, children's book)
- "How to Make an Inexpensive Screen" (1934, article)

== Personal life ==
Preble married anthropologist and museum director Frederick Webb Hodge in 1927. She died from liver cancer in 1934, at the age of 53, in South Pasadena, California. The Autry Museum of the American West has a collection of photographs by Zahrah Preble Hodge.
