= Michelle Hodge =

New Zealand footballer

Personal information
- Full name: Michelle Hodge
- Date of birth: 18 January 1975 (age 51)
- Place of birth: New Zealand
- Position: Goalkeeper

International career
Years	Team	Apps	(Gls)
1998–2000	New Zealand	3	(0)

Michelle Hodge (born 18 January 1975) is a former association football goalkeeper who represented New Zealand at international level.

Hodge made her Football Ferns début in a 1–4 loss to Germany on 26 May 1998, and finished her international career with three caps to her credit.
