= George Hodge (cricketer) =

Australian-born New Zealand cricketer

George Hodge (1878–1953) was an Australian-born cricketer who played one match of first-class cricket for Wellington during the 1907–08 New Zealand cricket season.

Hodge was born in Clunes, Victoria, Australia and died in Parkville, Victoria, Australia.
