= Arthur Hodge =

Arthur Hodge may refer to:

- Arthur William Hodge, the only British man ever to be hanged for the murder of a slave
- Arthur Hodge (colonial administrator), deputy governor of Anguilla

== See also ==
- Arthur Hodges, the first person in Clark County, Arkansas to be executed by means of the electric chair.
