= Stephen Hodge =

Stephen Hodge may refer to:

- Stephen Hodge (cyclist) (born 1961), Australian cyclist
- Stephen Hodge (born 1987), American football player selected in the 2009 NFL draft
- Stephen L. Hodge, American chief executive
- Steve Hodge (born 1962), English footballer
