= Benjamin Hodge =

Benjamin Hodge may refer to:

- Benjamin Hodge (Desperate Housewives), a character on Desperate Housewives
- Benjamin Lewis Hodge (1824–1864), Confederate politician
- Benjamin Hodge (Kansas politician) (born 1980), former member of the Kansas House of Representatives
