= Spalding & Hodge =

- Company type: Privately held company
- Industry: Stationery
- Founded: November 23, 1789 in The Strand, London
- Founders: Thomas Spalding and John Hodge
- Defunct: c. 1950s
- Fate: Sold
- Headquarters: Drury Lane, London, England
- Products: Paper, books
- Services: Book publishing

Spalding & Hodge was a London based manufacturing stationer and paper merchant founded on 23 November 1789 by Thomas Spalding and John Hodge. Initially operating from The Strand they moved to Drury Lane in 1797. In 1904 they moved to new purpose built premises at Drury House in Russell Street. The company remained in business until after the Second World War when it was eventually sold.

In the nineteenth century the company had the largest share of the British book paper market.

== Board members ==
Spalding & Hodge Board members:

Name	Birth	Death	Comment
Thomas Spalding	1762	1819	Founder
John Hodge			
Thomas Spalding	1805	1887	
Samuel Spalding	1808	1843	
John Hodge	1812	1901	
Henry Benjamin Spalding	1817	1908	
Samuel Spalding	1833	1887	
John Howard Spalding	1849	1916	Board member c1906
William F Hodge	1847	1904	
Walter Spalding	1855	1937	Board member c1906, Retired 1937
Sydney Thomas Spalding	1858	1937	Chairman
Edward Stanton Spalding	1863	1954	Retired 1921
Henry Shirley Blunt			Retired 1921
Harold Bayley			Board member c1906
Cuthbert Guy Spalding	1883	1966	
Sydney Leonard Spalding	1886	1964	Board member c1906
