= Edward Hodges =

English organist and composer

Edward Hodges (1796–1867) was an English organist and composer. He spent about 25 years of his life in New York City.

== Life ==
Born at Bristol, Hodges was mostly self-taught in music, and took an early interests in the mechanics of the church organ. He was organist at Clifton Church, and subsequently of two Bristol churches, St James' Priory and St Nicholas. In 1825 he proceeded to the degree of Doctor of Music from Sidney Sussex College, Cambridge. At this period he was a proponent of the C-compass organ. The "long compass" or "GGG-compass" organ, with pitch range extending below its lowest C, had been the British and American standard since the 17th century, but by the 1840s it was being replaced by the continental standard that ran from C to C. Hodges was active as a designer in making these changes.

In 1838 Hodges went with his family to America. He took up an appointment as organist to Toronto Cathedral. Then he became organist to St. John's Chapel in New York; and in 1846 to the third Trinity Church, opened on 21 May with an organ built to his own specifications.

In bad health, Hodges resigned his appointments and returned in 1863 to England. He died at Clifton, Bristol, 1 September 1867.

== Works ==
Hodges composed a morning and evening service and two anthems for the reopening of the organ, at St James' Priory, Bristol, 2 May 1824, and published them in 1825. A second edition of the evening service, in C, was published at New York in 1863. He also published:

- An Apology for Church Music and Musical Festivals, in answer to the animadversions of the "Standard" and the "Record", Bristol, 1834.
- Essay on the Cultivation of Church Music, 1841.
- Canticles of the Church, compiled New York, 1864.
- The Te Deum, with Kyrie Chant and Ter Sanctus, in D, published after the composer's death by his daughter, London, 1885.

The Trinity Collection of Church Music, edited by Samuel Parkman Tuckerman, Boston, 1864, contains psalm tunes, hymn tunes and arrangements by Hodges.

== Family ==
Hodges was survived by his children Faustina Hasse Hodges and John Sebastian Bach Hodges, both of whom composed.
