= Hannah Hodge =

Coal miner

- A hazard of hauling coal by basket illustrated by David Rorie. Coal mining by woman was outlawed by the Mines and Collieries Act 1842
- Born: 6 January 1751; Lochgelly, Fife.
- Died: c. 1833
- Occupation: Coalminer

Hannah Hodge (6 January 1751 to c.1833) was a coalminer from Lochgelly in Fife, Scotland and one of the few notable coalmining women about whom anything is documented.

== Biography ==
Hodge was born in Lochgelly in Fife, Scotland on 6 January 1751. She was the daughter of William Hodge and Bessie Adamson, coalminers.

Her husband was William Cook; they had five children. Upon his death, however, Hodge was compelled to take up her husband's job and work down the coal mine to make ends meet. The older children would carry the waste matter from the pit out on their backs and Hodge would work, shoulder-to-shoulder, with the men at the coal face with her two youngest with her in a basket she had brought them in. Her husband had died shortly after their fifth child had been born so Hodge would take breaks from mining at the coalface to breastfeed her youngest.

Hodge was acknowledged to be a hard worker and "brought more coal to the bank than any other miner."

Much of what we know about her life and working conditions were recorded from her conversations overheard by her grandson, Archibald (born 1833). Her recollections included competing with another female coalminer to see who was the strongest by carrying over four hundredweight (448 pounds (203 kg)) of coal. They also included memories of the air quality being so bad at the coalface that no lamp would burn and the light would come from 'fish heads'.

Hodge is thought to have died around 1833 or shortly after.
