= James W. Hodge =

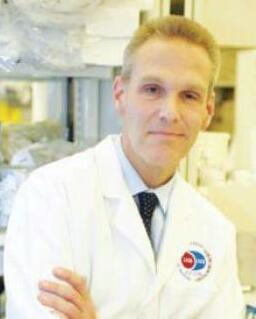
- Education: University of Tennessee at Martin; University of Tennessee; George Washington University
- Scientific career
- Fields: Cancer immunotherapy
- Workplaces: National Cancer Institute

James W. Hodge is an American cancer immunologist and senior investigator at the National Cancer Institute (NCI). He serves as the deputy director for translational research in the Center for Immuno-Oncology and is the head of the immunotherapeutics section. Hodge researches cancer immunotherapy, particularly the development of recombinant cancer vaccines and strategies that combine vaccines with radiation, chemotherapy, and other targeted therapeutics.

== Education ==
Hodge earned a B.S. in biology and chemistry from the University of Tennessee at Martin. He attended the University of Tennessee, where he received a M.S. in microbiology and a Ph.D. in comparative and experimental medicine. Hodge earned a M.B.A. in medicine and health care from George Washington University. He completed his postdoctoral training as an Intramural Research Training Award fellow at the National Cancer Institute (NCI).

== Career ==
Hodge came to the National Institutes of Health (NIH) in 1993 for training. From 1996 to 2011, he held positions of senior staff fellow, staff scientist, and senior scientist. A 1999 publication by Hodge and his colleagues showed that a triad of costimulatory molecules synergize to amplify T cell activation. Vaccines based on these three costimulatory molecules (TRICOM) have led to several clinical trials showing improved patient survival for a range of human carcinomas.

In 2011, Hodge became an investigator. Research from that time includes a publication on exploiting the differential homeostatic proliferation of T-cell subsets following chemotherapy to enhance the efficacy of vaccine-mediated antitumor responses. In 2013, he co-authored a publication detailing how chemotherapy-induced immunogenic modulation of tumor cells enhances killing by cytotoxic T lymphocytes and is distinct from immunogenic cell death.

Hodge was awarded tenure in 2016. His laboratory has focused on two areas, immunogenic modulation and immune subset conditioning. He is a senior investigator, head of the immunotherapeutics section and deputy director for translational research in the Center for Immuno-Oncology. His professional activities include serving as chairman of the Immunomodulation Committee for NRG Oncology and as a senior visiting professor (adjunct) in the department of radiation oncology and surgery at the Albert Einstein College of Medicine.
