= Hodges Point =

Hodges Point (67°21′S 65°3′W) is a rocky point terminating in an impressive black cliff, lying 6 nautical miles (11 km) east-northeast of Cape Northrop on the east coast of Graham Land, Antarctica. Twin summits on the point rise to 940 and 960 metres (3,080 and 3,150 ft). The feature was photographed by the United States Antarctic Service, 1939–41. It was mapped by the Falkland Islands Dependencies Survey 1947–48, and named by the UK Antarctic Place-Names Committee for Ben Hodges, General Assistant with the British Antarctic Survey Larsen Ice Shelf party, 1963–64.
