= Nicholas Vere-Hodge =

English cricketer and Royal Air Force officer

Personal information
- Full name: Nicholas Vere-Hodge
- Born: 31 October 1912; Woodford Green, Essex, England
- Died: 7 December 2005 (aged 93); Salisbury, Wiltshire, England
- Batting: Right-handed
- Role: Occasional wicket-keeper

Domestic team information
- Years: Team
- 1936–1939: Essex

Career statistics
Competition	First-class
Matches	23
Runs scored	713
Batting average	22.28
100s/50s	2/3
Top score	–
Balls bowled	–
Wickets	–
Bowling average	–
5 wickets in innings	–
10 wickets in match	–
Best bowling	–
Catches/stumpings	11/–
- Source: Cricinfo, 6 July 2011

Nicholas Vere-Hodge MB, FRCS, BCh, LRCP (31 October 1912 – 7 December 2005) was an English cricketer and Royal Air Force officer. In cricket, Vere-Hodge was a right-handed batsman who fielded occasionally as a wicket-keeper. He was born in Woodford Green, Essex.

He made his first-class debut for Essex in the 1936 County Championship against Kent. He made 22 further first-class appearances for Essex, the last of which came against Gloucestershire in the 1939 County Championship. In his 23 first-class appearances, he scored 713 runs at an average of 22.28, in the process making 3 half centuries and 2 centuries. His highest score of 108 came against Nottinghamshire at Trent Bridge in the 1937 County Championship. This season, in which he featured in 12 first-class matches, was also his most successful with the bat, with Hodge scoring 509 runs at an average of 26.78. The start of World War II after the 1939 season brought an end to his first-class career.

During the war, Vere-Hodge served in the Royal Air Force, with him holding the rank of flight lieutenant by February 1942. In the final months of the war, Vere-Hodge was by then a part of the Royal Air Force Volunteer Reserve. After the war, he played for the Royal Air Force cricket team against the Army at Lord's Cricket Ground, in a match which did not have first-class status. He died in Salisbury, Wiltshire on 7 December 2005.
