= Vanessa Hogge =

British ceramic artist

- Born: 1963 (age 62–63); Kenya
- Education: UWE and Royal College of Art
- Known for: Ceramics
- Style: Contemporary, organic, and ornate
- Website: vanessahogge.com

Vanessa Hogge (born 1963) is a British ceramic artist. She is known for her decorative floral wall pieces and vessels made from black and white stoneware and porcelain. After a 25-year hiatus, Hogge relaunched her ceramic practice from her studio in London.

== Background ==
Hogge was born in Kenya and raised in South Africa. She cites the childhood influence of the women in her mother's family, who have a long history of gardening, as a key element of her work. Her family relocated to the United Kingdom in 1977.

During her early career, Hogge's ceramic work was featured in Paul Smith's shops in London, Tokyo, and New York. Although the large sunflower vases she focused on in this period were stylistically different from her current work, the floral element was consistent.

By the mid-1990s, Hogge shifted to interior design and worked as a freelancer for several publications, including Homes & Gardens. After retraining and working as a graphic designer throughout much of the 2000s, she returned to full-time ceramics in 2015.

== Work ==
Each wallflower or vessel takes Hogge anywhere between two days to three weeks to craft. Since each bloom is shaped by hand using few, if any, ceramic tools, no two flowers are the same.

Today, Hogge exclusively works with black stoneware and porcelain, with separate work benches in her studio to avoid contamination. She describes the contrast between the two clays as "the smooth, creamy beauty of porcelain and the gritty toughness of black stoneware" that culminate in a crisp and sophisticated design.

Noted ceramics collector Preston Fitzgerald praised Hogge's "delicate, laboriously intensive, detailed work" at Ceramics Art London 2019.

Hogge named Frida Kahlo, Georgia O'Keeffe, and Marianne North as artistic influences.

=== Wallflowers ===
Hogge's wallflowers are flowerheads that can be hung on a wall or used as a table centerpiece. She has dabbled in dozens of flower types for the wallflowers, including chrysanthemums, delphiniums, and daisies. Given her expanding international customer base, Hogge plans on ‘inventing’ a few new flowers.

=== Vessels ===
Her collection has also grown to include vases and bowls. In 2017, one of Hogge's vessels was exhibited at TRESOR in Basel. This vessel was at the time Hogge's largest, made up of thousands of porcelain daphne flowers. The piece was critically acclaimed by international curators, who noted the intricate and intimate nature of her work.

Soon after, Hogge's Marigold vessel was selected to be included in the Best of Europe exhibition at the Michelangelo Foundation's Homo Faber showcase in Venice. She was chosen by 13 curators under the patronage of the European Parliament as a representation of contemporary European craftsmanship.

== Awards ==
- The Cockpit Arts/Radcliffe Craft Development Award
- craft&design Award at MADE London Marylebone 2017
- Maker of the Week, UK Crafts Council
