= Caspar Wistar Hodge =

Caspar Wistar Hodge may refer to:

- Caspar Wistar Hodge, Sr. (1830–1891)
- Caspar Wistar Hodge, Jr. (1870–1937)
