= Knashawn H. Morales =

American biostatistician

Knashawn Hodge Morales is an American biostatistician.

Morales and her sister were raised in North Carolina, where their mother worked as a chemist and their father was an architectural engineer. Inspired by numerous relatives, Morales chose to attend a historically black university. After her sophomore year at Hampton University, Morales and her roommate Scarlett Bellamy pursued a biostatistics-focused summer internship at the University of North Carolina at Chapel Hill with professor Lloyd Edwards. Morales completed her bachelor's degree in mathematics in 1995. Morales and Bellamy later attended Harvard University's Chan School of Public Health together, and were both advised by Louise M. Ryan. After completing her ScD in 2001, Morales began working at the New England Research Institutes. Since 2003, Morales has taught at the University of Pennsylvania's Perelman School of Medicine. She is additionally affiliated with Perelman's Center for Clinical Epidemiology and Biostatistics, and serves as director of statistics within UPenn's Master of Science in Health Policy Research program.

In 2022, Morales was elected a fellow of the American Statistical Association.
