= Catfish Hodge =

American blues musician

Bobby Allen Hodge (born May 31, 1945), better known as Catfish Hodge, is an American blues musician.

== Early life and education ==
Hodge was born in Kentucky and grew up in Detroit, Michigan, United States.

== Career ==
Catfish Hodge formed the Catfish Band, in which he sang and played guitar. The band performed in the 1960s Detroit Rock scene, opening up for Bob Seger, Black Sabbath, Ted Nugent, and played the Fillmore East. He played with the 1980s band Bluesbusters, which released two albums.

During this period he also made frequent trips to the New Orleans area. Combining the sounds from Detroit and New Orleans, Hodge put out the album Soap's Opera, which featured Bonnie Raitt and Dr. John.

In 1980, Hodge was signed to Adelphi Records. That year he formed a band called Chicken Legs, which toured 17 cities.

In 1983, he and his brother Dallas Hodge formed a band called the Hodge Brothers Band, and performed music from the Chicken Legs album.

In 1996, Hodge recorded a children's album, Adventures at Catfish Pond.

== Personal life ==
He was married to animator Kathleen Quaife-Hodge, and they had two sons, Curtis and Max. He now resides in Illinois with his current wife, Linda Fisher Hodge.

== Discography ==
- 1970: Get Down
- 1970: Live Catfish
- 1971: Empathy
- 1972: Boogie Man Gonna Get Ya
- 1974: Dinosaurs and Alleycats
- 1975: Soap Opera's
- 1976: An Evening with Catfish Hodge
- 1979: Eye Witness Blues / Bout With the Blues
- 1979: Live at the Bayou
- 1981: Catfish Hodge & Chicken Legs (Freebo)
- 1981: Bout with the Blues
- 1981: This Time (Bluesbusters)
- 1986: Accept No Substitute (Bluesbusters)
- 1994: Catfish Blues
- 1995: Like A Big Dog Barking
- 1996: Adventures at Catfish Pond
- 1997: Bare Necessities
- 2001: Let's Eat
- 2002: Twenty Years
- 2006: Communication
- 2014: Different Strokes

== Other sources ==
- Encyclopedia of Popular Music, Colin Larkin, Bish Bash Books, 5th Edition, September 14, 2007, ISBN 978-1846098567
