= Donald Hodge =

Donald Hodge may refer to:

- Donald Hodge (basketball) (born 1969), American basketball player
- Donald Hodge (veteran) (1894–1997), English World War I veteran
