= Faustina Hasse Hodges =

English-American organist and composer

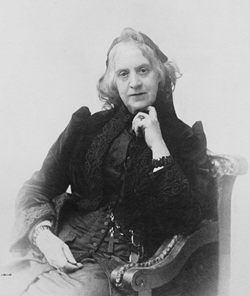
- Born: 7 August 1822; Malmesbury, England
- Died: 4 February 1895 (aged 72); Philadelphia, Pennsylvania
- Burial place: Church of St. James the Less
- Occupations: Organist, composer
- Father: Edward Hodges

Faustina Hasse Hodges (7 August 1822 – 4 February 1895) was an English-American organist and composer.

== Life and work ==
She was born in Malmesbury, England, in 1822, as one of four children born to the organist and composer Edward Hodges. All of the children became organists.

Edward Hodges emigrated to New York in 1838 and Faustina joined him there in 1841 at the age of 19.

=== Organist ===
During the 1850s, Faustina Hodges worked as a church organist in Brooklyn and Philadelphia and taught organ, piano and voice at the Troy Female Seminary run by Emma Willard.

By the late 1870s, she was playing the organ at two Philadelphia churches.

=== Composer ===
She began publishing her own compositions in the 1850s, and she wrote and published music until her death. Hodges became known for a wide variety of keyboard and vocal music. Two of her compositions, secular sentimental songs from 1859, Dreams and The Rose Bush, became especially popular. She also wrote comic works such as the song The Indignant Spinster in the 1860s.

=== Biographer ===
After the death of his wife in 1863, her father returned to England. To memorialize his life, Faustina published one of his cathedral services in 1874. She went on to publish a biography of her father, which was published in 1896, a year after her death.

She died in Philadelphia at 71 and is buried there at the Church of St. James the Less.

== Selected musical works ==
Selected compositions include:

- L’Amicizia (Friendship)
- Tantum Ergo Opus 65, No. 2
- A psalm of life (Text: Henry Wadsworth Longfellow)
- Dreams: a reverie (Text: H.C.L.)
- Robin Adair
- The dreary day (Text: Henry Wadsworth Longfellow)
- The holy dead (Text: Henry Wadsworth Longfellow after Ernst Stockmann)
- The rose bush (Text: W. W. Caldwell)

== Selected written works ==
- Hodges, F. H. (1896). Edward Hodges: Doctor in Music of Sydney Sussex College, Cambridge; Organist... Bristol, England, 1819–1838; Organist and Director in Trinity Parish, New York, 1839–1859. GP Putnam's sons.
