= Frederick Hodge =

Frederick Hodge may refer to:

- Frederick A. Hodge (1853–1922), American businessman and politician
- Frederick Webb Hodge (1864–1956), editor, anthropologist, archaeologist and historian

== See also ==
- Frederick Hodges (disambiguation)
