= George Hodges (umpire) =

Australian cricket umpire (died 1899)

George John Hodges (1841/1842 – 30 May 1899) was an Australian Test cricket umpire.

== Life and career ==
Hodges was born in the United Kingdom and moved to Australia in the 1860s. He umpired two first-class matches in February 1884 and January 1885. In the match in Adelaide in February 1884 between Victoria and South Australia he also acted as the Victorian team's manager.

Hodges replaced Ted Elliott, who had died suddenly, a few days before the Test in Melbourne between Australia and England on 21 March 1885 to 25 March 1885. England won the match by an innings and 98 runs. Hodges' colleague was Jim Phillips, standing in the first of his 13 Tests in Australia.

Some of Hodges' decisions in the Test caused such dissatisfaction among some of the English players that during the Australians' second innings he stood down and was replaced by Tom Garrett, who was playing in the Test for Australia. Phillips had earlier needed to be replaced during the match owing to illness. Hodges umpired no further first-class matches.

Hodges was a committee member of the Richmond Cricket Club in the 1880s and 1890s.

Hodges worked for Victorian Railways. He died in May 1899 of heart failure at his son's farm in Bayswater, which was at that time beyond the eastern suburbs of Melbourne. His wife Bessie died in 1916. They had two sons and two daughters.

== See also ==
- List of Test umpires
