= Helen Hodge Harris =

American aviator

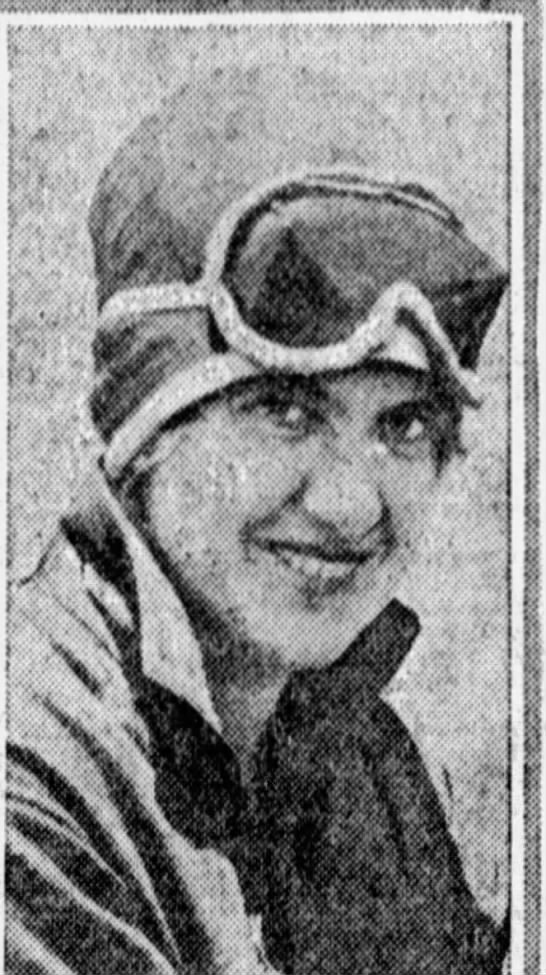
- Born: Helen Hodge; August 2, 1892; Omaha, Nebraska, United States
- Died: 1967 (aged 74–75); Pomona, California, United States

Helen Hodge Harris (1892–1967) was among the first women to earn a pilot's license. She was therefore one of the few women among the Early Birds of Aviation. In addition she became a proponent of flight safety. She later became supervisor of a machine shop.

== Early life and first marriage ==
Hodge was born in Omaha, Nebraska on August 2, 1892. She was educated at the Brownell-Talbot School (then Brownell Hall) before moving to Oakland, California with her family. They appear to have settled in Oakland by roughly 1909, when she married Ralph Newbre. In June 1916, Hodge filed for divorce, claiming Newbre had been unfaithful. A July article mentions her living with her father, and she seems to have reclaimed her maiden name. However, it appears that they may have reconciled: a 1919 article refers to the Newbres as husband and wife, and the book Before Amelia: Women Pilots in the Early Days of Aviation seems to imply that they stayed together until Ralph Newbre's death in the 1930s.

== Aviator ==
Hodge and her twin sister, Florence "Dot" Hodge, took flying lessons together at Silas Christofferson's school in Redwood City, California, after being initially rejected due to their gender. Their instructor was aviator Frank Bryant, who taught them to fly on a Curtiss-type biplane. A San Francisco Examiner profile written in July 1916 described Helen as "the more venturesome of the couple". Their father, J.B. Hodge, reportedly disapproved of them learning to fly, but "accepted the situation philosophically."

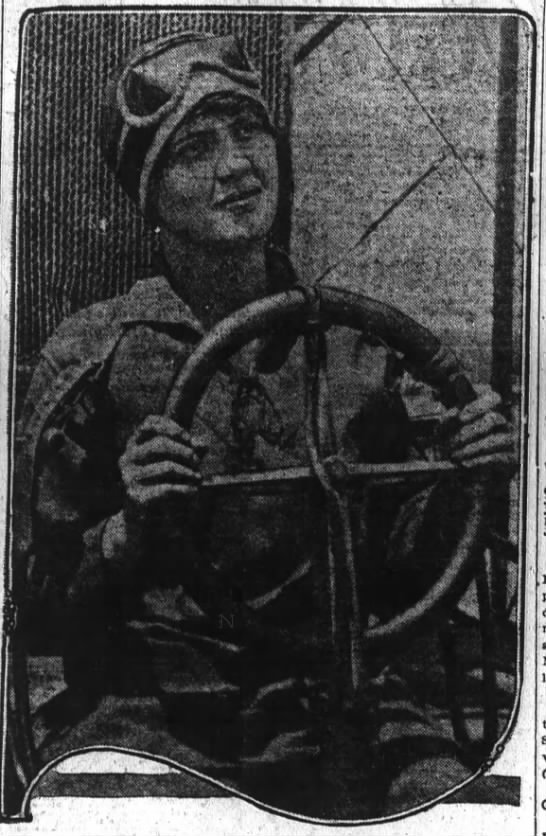
Hodge in Los Gatos, California in 1919

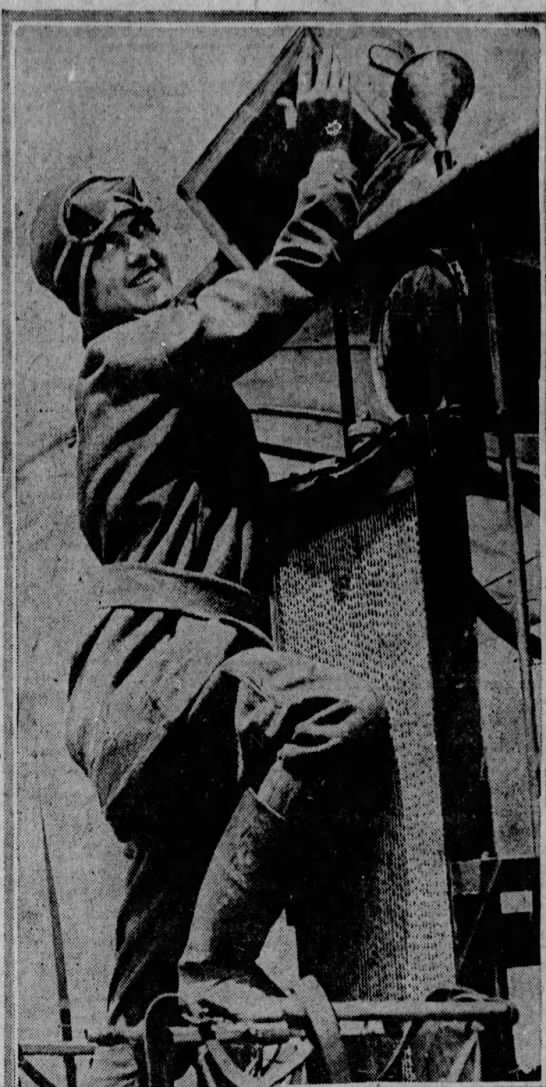
Hodge at the Redwood City aviation school in 1916

Hodge trained at the Christofferson school for six months. During one flight while Hodge was at an altitude of 1500 feet, her plane's motor mount broke, causing the motor to come loose. Hodge managed to land safely, "much to the surprise of even her teachers."

Hodge's first independent flight was made over San Francisco Bay on August 19, 1916, and she received her pilot's license on November 12, 1916. At the time, she planned to become an exhibition flyer. Though she did perform several exhibition flights for the Christofferson school, most of her flights appear to have been simply for her own pleasure. Hodge was the eleventh female pilot in the United States to receive her license, and possibly the last American woman to become a licensed pilot before the start of World War I. During the war, she was a flight instructor for American cadets.

== Later life and death ==
Hodge married Frank Harris in 1937 after moving to Los Angeles. There, she opened a machine shop specializing in airplane tools. She supervised a crew of twenty men and fourteen women, and could operate machinery herself as needed. Frank Harris had died by 1950. Hodge died in Pomona, California, in 1967.
