= John Neal Hodges =

American military officer (1884–1965)

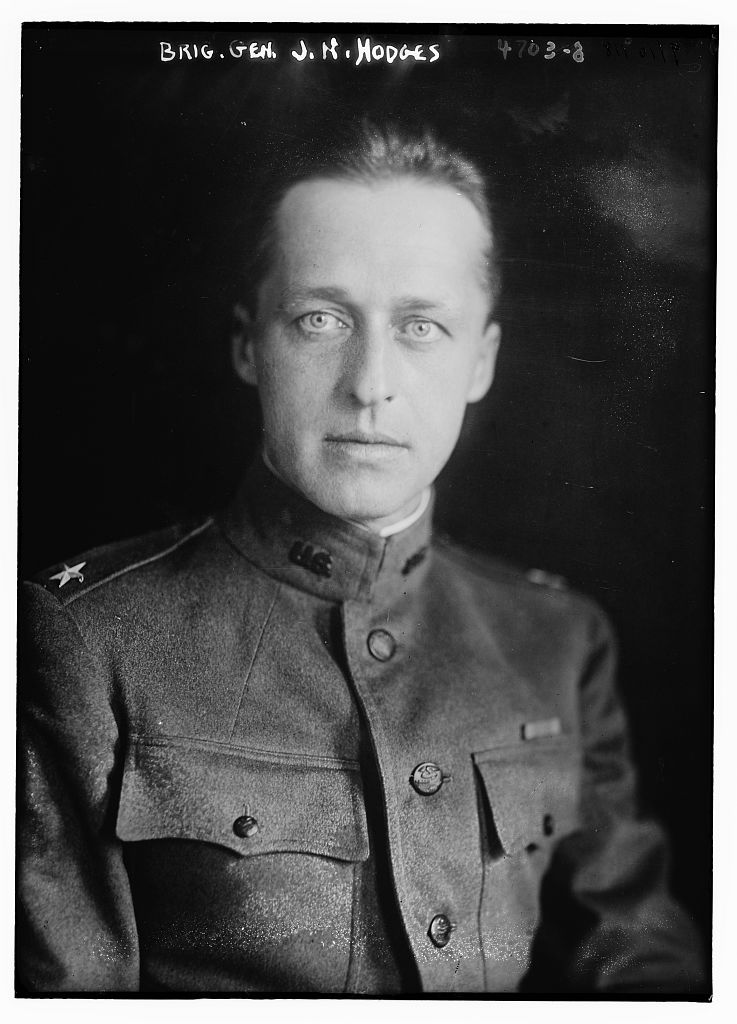
- Born: February 13, 1884; Baltimore, Maryland, US
- Died: January 18, 1965 (aged 80); Brooke Army Medical Center, San Antonio, Texas, US
- Military career
- Allegiance: United States
- Branch: United States Army
- Service years: 1905–1944
- Rank: Brigadier general
- Conflicts: World War I World War II
- Awards: Distinguished Service Medal; Legion of Merit

John Neal Hodges (February 13, 1884 – January 18, 1965) was a United States Army officer in the early 20th century. He served in World War I and World War II.

== Biography ==
Hodges was born in Baltimore on February 13, 1884. He graduated from the United States Military Academy in 1905.

Hodges was commissioned into the United States Army Corps of Engineers. He commanded the Sixth Engineer Regiment during World War I, and he worked with the British to build bridges on the Somme. Hodges received the Distinguished Service Medal for his efforts, and on June 26, 1918, he was promoted to the rank of brigadier general.

After the war's end, Hodges worked at the office of the Chief of Engineers in Washington, D.C., and he served as the editor of the Military Engineer from 1929 to 1931. He served as the Chief Engineer of the North Atlantic Division from 1943 to 1944, and he received the Legion of Merit for his performance in World War II.

Hodges retired in 1944. He died at Brooke Army Medical Center on January 18, 1965. He is buried in Encinal, Texas.

== Bibliography ==
- Davis, Henry Blaine Jr. (1998). Generals in Khaki. Raleigh, North Carolina: Pentland Press. ISBN 1571970886. OCLC 40298151.
