= Association for Continuing Legal Education =

Association for Continuing Legal Education (ACLEA) is an international organization established in 1964 devoted to improving the performance of Continuing Legal Education (CLE) professionals. It is based in Saint Paul, Minnesota.
