= Gregory Hodge =

Gregory M. Hodge was the principal for over a decade at The Frederick Douglass Academy (FDA) in Harlem, where he was noted for his tough love, "No Excuses" approach.

== Early life ==
Hodge was raised in Harlem and the Bronx. Orphaned by the age of 16, he recounts to his students a life of homelessness that puts him on a par with their own experiences of poverty. After a counselor "forced" him not to leave school, he earned two Master's degrees and a doctorate.

== Career ==
Hodge spent 31 years as a New York City school teacher, culminating in his 14-year tenure at FDA that began in 1995 when he replaced the founding principal, Lorraine Monroe. He retired from FDA and teaching in general in July 2011.

Hodge is noted for his tough love, "No Excuses" approach to education, enforcing strict discipline within his school of mostly lower-income students. He advocated personal attention to the students and personal responsibility: he greeted each student at the door every day and frequently spent nights on the couch in his office. He said: "We do everything we can to help, but we place the burden on them to get the job done." When he became principal at FDA in 1995, the student body was 80% female; he recruited boys to equalize the sexes but achievement did not decline.

== Death ==
Dr. Hodge died on February 16, 2019, at the age of 65.
