= Girlie Hodges =

Australian surgeon and field hockey player (1904-1999)

Girlie Hodges MBBS, MS
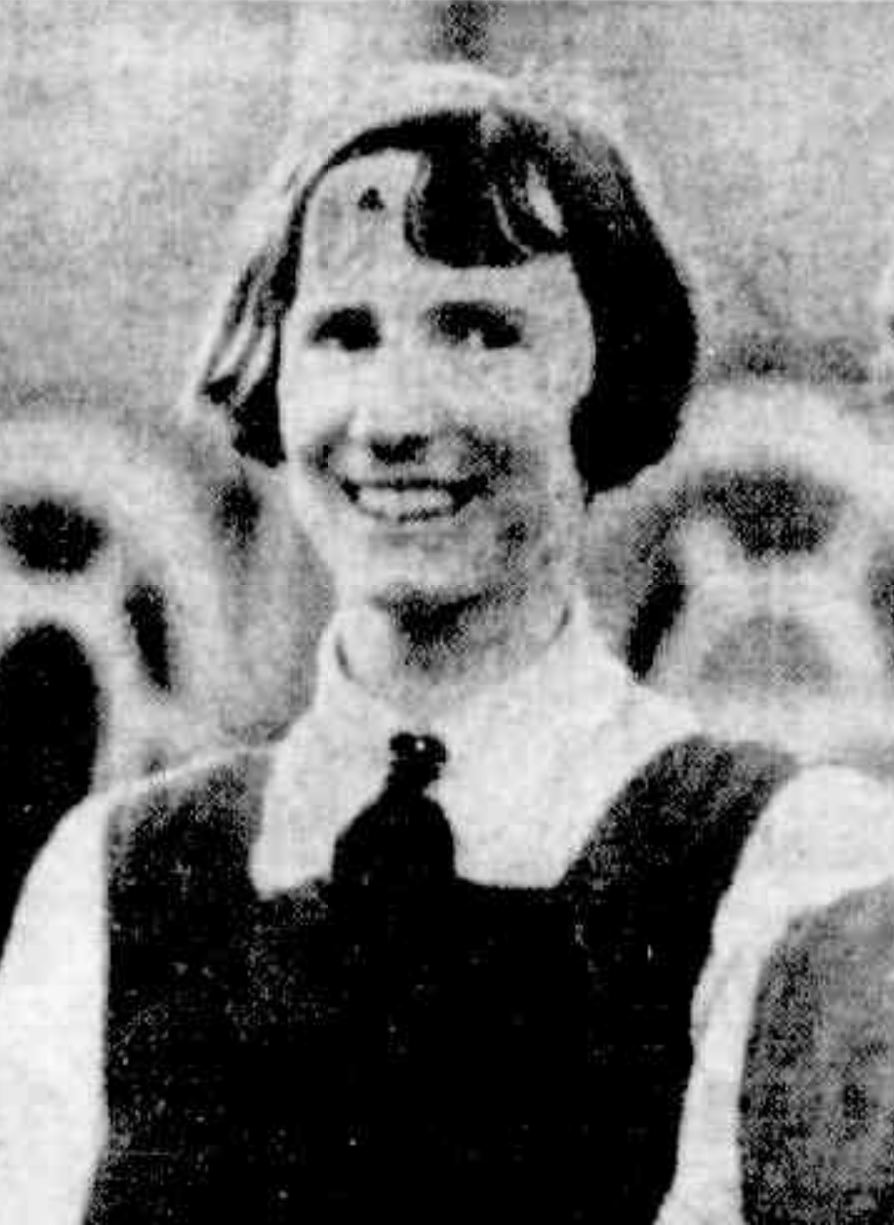
- Born: George Chapple Hodges; 24 November 1904; Edinburgh, Midlothian, Scotland
- Died: 13 June 1999 (aged 94); Melbourne, Victoria, Australia
- Education: Church of England Girls Grammar School; Melbourne University
- Occupation: Surgeon
- Medical career
- Institutions: Queen Victoria Hospital, Melbourne

Girlie George Chapple Hodges MBBS, MS was a surgeon from Melbourne, who was selected to play on the Australia women's national field hockey team during the 1920s and 1930s. She also played on the varsity and state levels, and was known as being fast and reliable on the wing. Hodges attended Melbourne University medical school, gaining her MBBS in 1931, and working at the Royal Melbourne Hospital, the Royal Children's Hospital, and the Queen Victoria Hospital as a medical doctor and surgical assistant. In 1939, she graduated with a Master of Surgery. She was the first woman to gain this degree in Victoria.

== Early life and education ==
Hodges was born in Edinburgh Scotland to two Australian medical students Bessie Hodges (née Chapple) (1876–1952) and George Agincourt Hodges (1882–1968). Bessie had begun her medical studies at Melbourne University before travelling to Edinburgh with Eileen Fitzgerald to complete their studies. While they both received excellent results, only Fitzgerald became a doctor. Bessie married George, who convinced her to cease her studies and let him support her, a decision she reportedly regretted, particularly during World War I when women doctors were considered useful. Hodges's paternal grandfather was Henry Hodges (1844–1919), a Puisne judge on the Supreme Court of Victoria, although newspapers reported him as being her father when she received her Master of Surgery degree. Hodges attended the Church of England girls grammar school (Melbourne Girls grammar). Hodges attended Queen's College at the University of Melbourne.

While Hodges was initially more interested in studying music, even switching from a medicine degree to a music degree, Bessie encouraged her to pursue medicine, so Hodges switched back and finished the degree. She graduated with a MBBS in 1931, achieving first class honours in surgery as well as obstetrics and gynaecology. In 1934 Hodges purchased a Nash 'speedstream' Ambassador. Hodges started working at the Queen Victoria Hospital in 1935.

== Hockey career ==
While at university, Hodges joined the Melbourne University hockey club. She then joined the Victorian team, and competed at the state level. Hodges' debut match was in 1927 at the first International Hockey match hosted in Adelaide. She played in all three matches against England.

As a hockey player, Hodges was a fast and reliable player on the wing. A quote from a 1937 newspaper report states "you will do well to watch how fast she is, and how cleverly she dodges her opponents".

Hodges was required to mix her skills on occasions when medical events happened on the field, such as giving stitches when a player was 'sloshed' in the eye. She was involved in hockey activities outside of the games as well, she was on the Victorian Umpires' Committee, assisting with training umpires and supervising their examinations. After she retired as a player she was a member of the selection committee.

=== Hockey Tour: 1936 Women's IFWHA world conference ===
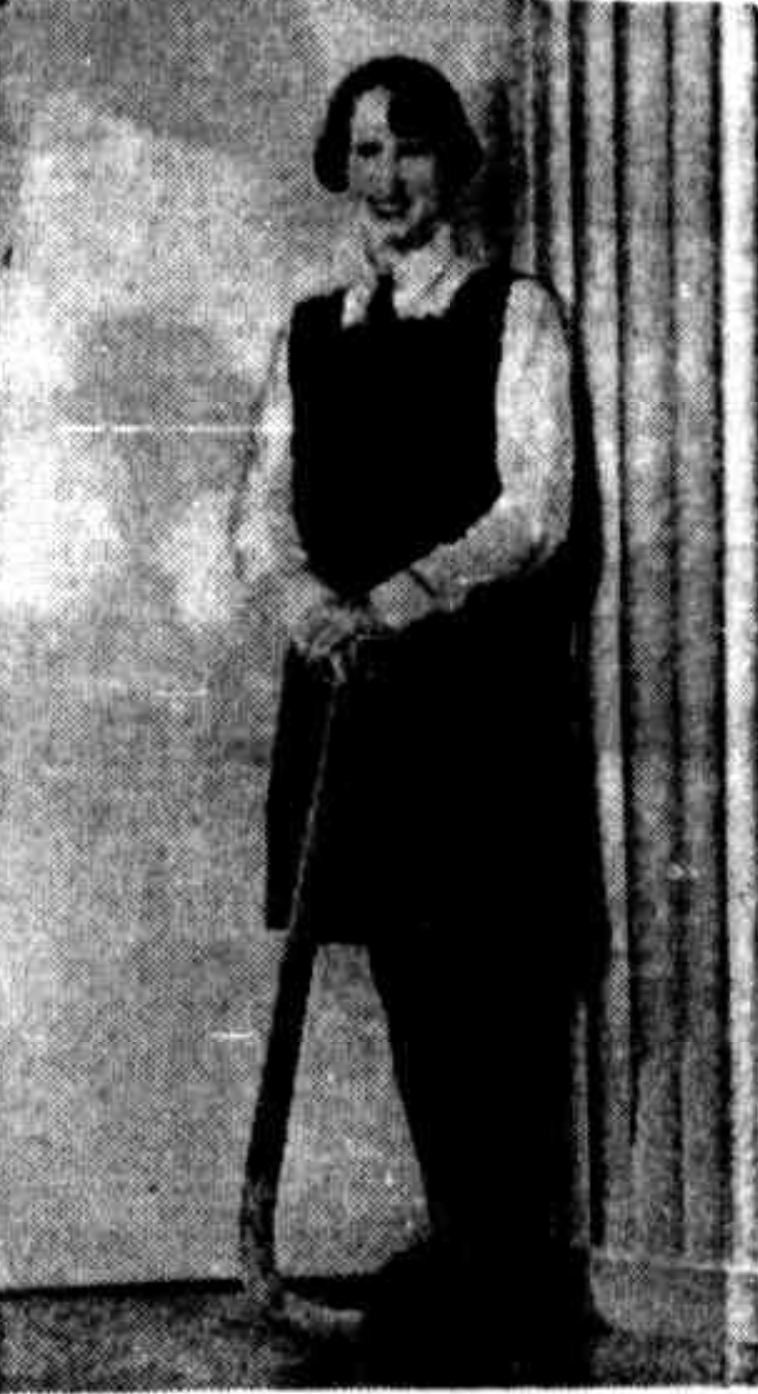
Dr. Girlie Hodges, c.1936

In the lead up to the selection for the 1936 Australian team selection, Hodges' father George trained with her. This inspired him to start competitive sports himself to keep fit, leading to him get tennis lessons and 6 years later enter the MCC championships at 58. On 3 September 1936, Hodges attended a women's hockey tournament in Sydney celebrating there, where 1000 people took part in a parade before Hodges and the rest of the Australian team played a game.

Hodges had to take four months off work for her hockey tour. She was made to resign from her position at the Royal Melbourne hospital, and planned to apply for reinstatement when she returned.

In October 1936 Hodges travelled to the USA, to play in the Women's IFWHA World Conference (a precursor to the Women's FIH Hockey World Cup), competing with England, Ireland, Wales, Scotland, South African, and the USA. The team travelled on the ship Niagra, with the athletes keeping to a strict routine, training on the deck everyday, and maintaining a diet drawn up by Hodges. They stopped first in New Zealand where Hodges scored a goal in a game against Auckland, Australia winning 6–0. On a stop in Hawaii the team discovered a "George Hodges" was booked into their room and assuming it was a man they panicked. Hodges had only been known as "Girlie" to the team, and this was how they discovered her official name. The tour took them to Vancouver, Chicago, New York, Philadelphia, Arizona, Los Angeles, and San Francisco. Hodges was briefly asked to sign on as the ship surgeon when another ship requested the Niagra's surgeon to assist with a medical incident.

While on the tour of the USA for the hockey tournament, Hodges took the opportunity to visit medical universities and hospitals to gain more knowledge. She visited University of Chicago's Billings Hospital, and witnessed a gastroscopy clinic, the only one of its kind in the USA at the time. she also visited Chicago Women’s Hospital, and the Jesse Spalding School for children with disabilities. Hodges also attended a meeting at the American College of Surgeons in Philadelphia.

== Surgical career ==
In 1939, Hodges graduated with a Master of Surgery degree from Melbourne University. She was the first woman to gain this degree at the university. Hodges became a surgeon because at a time when, without access to antibiotics, if a patient had pneumonia the physicians have to wait and see what happened on the fifth or "the crisis" day, when the person would either get better or die. Hodges didn't want to do that, she felt that surgeons were able to work on problems that they could fix, they could remove a lump or an appendix.

Hodges started at the Queen Victoria Hospital, Melbourne, in 1935 in a gynaecology clinic run by Ann McLeod. After McLeod retired, Hodges took over running the clinic. She was also a clinical assistant at the Royal Melbourne Hospital, and the Children’s Hospital. During World War II, Hodges worked primarily as an associate surgeon at the Royal Melbourne Hospital. In 1941, Hodges was appointed as assistant to John Turner and as a part time assistant to the radiologist at the Royal Melbourne Hospital. She continued at the hospital as an associate surgeon throughout the war.

Hodges practiced surgery until she was approximately 74, before retiring. She died on 13 June 1999, aged 94.
