= William W. Sellers =

American lawyer (born 1968)

William Wentworth Sellers (born January 12, 1968) was the fourteenth President of Wentworth Military Academy and College in Lexington, Missouri, serving from 2008 to 2013. He was the fourth generation of his family to head the school, following his great-grandfather Sandford Sellers, who led Wentworth from its founding in 1880 until 1923, his great-uncle Sandford Sellers, Jr. (1923–1933), his grandfather James M. Sellers (1933–1960), and his father James M. Sellers, Jr. (1973–1990). He is also a direct descendant of Academy founder Stephen G. Wentworth. Sellers currently serves as President of the Journey Through Hallowed Ground National Heritage Area.

== Biography ==
William W. Sellers grew up on the campus of Wentworth Military Academy. He attended Lexington public schools before entering Wentworth in 1982. At Wentworth, he finished first academically in his class all four years, captained the football, basketball and track teams, edited the school yearbook and newspaper, played saxophone in the band, and was company commander of Headquarters Company.

After graduating from Wentworth, he entered Harvard University, where he earned a degree in history. At Harvard, he lettered twice in football, was a member of the 1987 Ivy League championship team, and was voted by his teammates as the winner of the Henry N. Lamar Award as the "senior member of the Harvard Football squad who, through his dedication to the program and concern for his fellow man, has made a unique contribution to Harvard football." In 1997, he earned his Juris Doctor from the University of Missouri School of Law, where he was named to The Order of Barristers and was a member of the Missouri Environmental Law & Policy Review. Following graduation, he served as a clerk for the Western District of the Missouri Court of Appeals for a year, then entered private practice in Kansas City, Missouri, focusing primarily on class actions and complex litigation.

In 2008, he was named President of Wentworth Military Academy. Prior to his appointment as President, he had served on Wentworth's Alumni Council, Board of Visitors, and on the Executive Committee of the Board of Trustees. When Sellers took over as President in December 2008, enrollment was at 155 cadets, its lowest point since the 1930s. Sellers oversaw four consecutive years of enrollment growth, ultimately increasing on campus enrollment by over 50% to 238 cadets by 2013—its highest level in two decades. He built the commuter college enrollment to its highest level in Wentworth's history, with 334 full-time students. Including part-time students, the college enrolled about 1,000 students a year. He also placed a major emphasis on growing the international student population, increasing the number of foreign students from 9 in 2008 to over 60 international students from 14 countries by 2013.

Sellers led the school through two accreditation visits by the Higher Learning Commission, a comprehensive visit in 2009 and a focused visit in 2012, and added a Homeland Security associate degree to the college offerings. He served as president of the Association of Military Colleges and Schools of the United States in 2011-12, and was the first Wentworth president ever to serve on the Presidential Advisory Committee to Missouri's Coordinating Board for Higher Education. Wentworth added a number of articulation agreements with colleges and student transfer agreements with high schools around the state and nationally as a result.

Another major initiative during Sellers' tenure was the restart of the college athletic program in 2011, bringing back college men's soccer, women's volleyball, men's and women's basketball, men's wrestling, men's and women's track and cross country, men's baseball and women's softball. The men's basketball team was the NJCAA Region XVI basketball regular season co-champions in 2012-13, only the second year of the program's reinstatement. Wentworth also increased its fundraising by over 50% under Sellers, despite the economic downturn that began in October 2008, and oversaw investment of over $1 million in facilities.

He stepped down as Wentworth's president following graduation in May 2013.

He serves on the board of directors of the State Historical Society of Missouri, is a past president of the Harvard Club of Kansas City, and served on the board of directors of the Harvard Alumni Association. He is a member of the Missouri Bar Association. He has managed a number of political campaigns, including the 1992 re-election campaign of Congressman Ike Skelton, formerly Chairman of the House Armed Services Committee.
