= Ron Toman =

American football player and coach (1934–2011)

Biographical details
- Born: October 30, 1934; Kansas City, Missouri, U.S.
- Died: June 2, 2011 (aged 76); Phoenix, Arizona, U.S.

Playing career
- 1957–1959: Missouri
- Positions: Quarterback, defensive back, linebacker

Coaching career (HC unless noted)
- 1960–1961: Central HS (MO) (B team)
- 1962: Missouri (GA)
- 1963: Rich Central HS (IL) (backfield)
- 1964–1966: Joplin / Missouri Southern
- 1967–1968: Wichita State (QB/WR)
- 1969–1970: Northeast Missouri State (OC)
- 1971–1972: Tulane (freshmen)
- 1973–1975: Tulane (OB)
- 1976–1980: Notre Dame (QB/WR)
- 1981–1985: Texas (OC)
- 1986–1987: Northwestern (QB)
- 1990–1991: Akron (OC)

Administrative career (AD unless noted)
- 1994–?: Indianapolis Colts (scout)

Head coaching record
- Overall: 22–6

Accomplishments and honors

Championships
- 2 Interstate Conference (1964–1965)

Ron Toman (October 30, 1934 – June 2, 2011) was an American football player and coach. He was an assistant coach at Tulane University, the University of Texas at Austin, and the University of Notre Dame. Toman was the head football coach at Joplin Junior College—now known as Missouri Southern State University—from 1964 to 1966, compiling a record of 22–6. He served as offensive coordinator for the Texas Longhorns from 1981 to 1985, succeeding Leon Manley.

Toman played college football at the University of Missouri under coaches Frank Broyles and Dan Devine before graduating in 1960. He began his coaching career that fall as an assistant in football and track at Central High School in Springfield, Missouri. He left Central High school in 1962 to pursue a master's degree at the University of Missouri. Toman returned to the high school ranks in 1963 as the backfield coach at Rich Central High School in Olympia Fields, Illinois. In 1964, he was hired as the head football coach at Joplin Junior College, succeeding Dudley Stegge. After three seasons as Joplin, Toman left to become an assistant coach at Wichita State University under head coach Boyd Converse. He joined the coaching staff at Northeast Missouri State University—now known as Truman State University—in 1969 as an assistant under head coach Russ Sloan, who had played alongside Toman at Missouri. After two seasons as the offensive coordinator at Northeast Missouri State, Toman went to Tulane University, in 1971, as freshman football coach under head football coach Bennie Ellender. Two years later, he was promoted to offensive backs coach for the varsity team. In 1976, Toman reunited with Devine when he was hired as an assistant coach at Notre Dame. He spent five seasons coaching quarterbacks and receivers for the Notre Dame Fighting Irish, mentoring quarterbacks Joe Montana, Rusty Lisch, and Blair Kiel. Toman left Notre Dame in 1981 to become an assistant at Texas under Fred Akers.

Toman died on June 2, 2011, in Phoenix, Arizona.

== Head coaching record ==
Year	Team	Overall	Conference	Standing	Bowl/playoffs	NJCAA^{#}
Joplin / Missouri Southern Lions (Interstate Conference) (1964–1966)
1964	Joplin	6–3	4–0			
1965	Joplin	10–0	5–0	1st		3
1966	Missouri Southern	6–3				
Missouri Southern:		22–6				
Total:		22–6				
National championship Conference title Conference division title or championship game berth
