= James M. Sellers Jr. =

Colonel James McBrayer Sellers Jr. (March 1, 1929 – August 3, 1993), served as Superintendent of Wentworth Military Academy in Lexington, Missouri from 1973 to 1990.

Sellers grew up on the campus of Wentworth Military Academy, a school founded by his maternal great-great-grandfather, Stephen G. Wentworth, and run by his paternal grandfather, Sandford Sellers, from 1880 to 1923, and by his father, James M. Sellers, from 1933 to 1960. Mac Sellers Jr. was a 1945 Wentworth graduate. He served as an enlisted man in the U.S. Navy from 1946 to 1948, and later as an officer in the U.S. Army, first on active duty and then in the reserves. In 1952, he earned a B.A. from Yale University, where he was named the Distinguished Military Graduate, and in 1956, he received an M.B.A. from Harvard Business School, where he ranked in the top 5% of his class and was elected a Baker Scholar. Following his graduation, he spent a year on the Harvard Business School faculty as Research assistant to Georges Doriot, Professor of Manufacturing.

Sellers worked as Corporate Budget Director and served on the Executive Committee of the Vendo Corporation from 1958 to 1965, and then moved on to the Faultless Starch/Bon Ami Company, first as Executive Vice-President/Treasurer and then as interim CEO. In 1968, he co-founded International Laser Systems (ILS) along with company president and lifelong friend, laser pioneer William C. Schwartz, and raised the initial venture capital of $850,000 to get the company off the ground. He served as a Director of ILS from 1968 to 1983, and as Director of Schwartz Electro-Optics from 1984-1993.

He was appointed as the seventh Superintendent of Wentworth Military Academy in 1973, after having served on the Board of Trustees since 1959. When he took over Wentworth, the school was facing its severest threat since the Great Depression of the 1930s. The Vietnam War had created a strong anti-military sentiment, and enrollment dropped precipitously at military schools throughout the country. Many such institutions closed. Wentworth was further destabilized by a devastating fire on August 7, 1975 that destroyed 32,000 square feet (3,000 m^{2}) of space, including old D Company Barracks, the military department, the band room, the rifle range, maintenance shops, and administrative offices. However, through budget cuts and careful fiscal management, Sellers was able to stabilize the school, and by 1978, enrollment was again on the upswing, peaking at over 400 students by 1985. A highlight of Sellers' tenure was Wentworth's Centennial Celebration in 1980, culminating with Vice President Walter Mondale's commencement address to the cadet corps. Sellers served as president of the Association of Military Colleges and Schools of the United States in 1982.

He resigned as Wentworth's superintendent in 1990 and died in 1993. One of his four sons, William W. Sellers, served as President of Wentworth from 2008 to 2013.
