= 1964 junior college football season =

American junior college football season

- National Championship: Shrine Bowl, Savannah, GA (NJCAA)
- Champion(s): Long Beach (Gridwire); Phoenix (NJCAA)

The 1964 junior college football season was the season of intercollegiate junior college football running from September to December 1964. Phoenix won the NJCAA National Football Championship, defeating Oklahoma Military Academy in the Shrine Bowl in Savannah, Georgia. Long Beach, champions of California's Metropolitan Conference and winners of the Junior Rose Bowl over Cameron, placed in the top spot in Gridwire's final junior college rankings.

== Conference standings ==
=== California ===
1964 Central California Junior College Association football standings
	Conf.					Overall
Team	W		L		T	W		L		T
Coalinga $	5	–	0	–	0	9	–	1	–	0
Reedley	4	–	1	–	0	5	–	4	–	0
Hancock	3	–	2	–	0	4	–	5	–	0
Taft	2	–	3	–	0	4	–	4	–	1
Porterville	1	–	3	–	0	3	–	5	–	0
Merced	0	–	5	–	0	2	–	7	–	0
$ – Conference champion

1964 Coast Conference football standings
	Conf.					Overall
Team	W		L		T	W		L		T
Menlo $	5	–	0	–	0	8	–	1	–	0
Monterey Peninsula	4	–	1	–	0	7	–	3	–	0
Vallejo	3	–	2	–	0	5	–	4	–	0
Cabrillo	2	–	3	–	0	3	–	6	–	0
Hartnell	1	–	4	–	0	3	–	6	–	0
Gavilan	0	–	5	–	0	0	–	9	–	0
$ – Conference champion

1964 Eastern Conference (California) football standings
	Conf.					Overall
Team	W		L		T	W		L		T
Fullerton $	7	–	0	–	0	8	–	2	–	0
Orange Coast	5	–	2	–	0	6	–	4	–	0
Santa Ana	5	–	2	–	0	5	–	4	–	0
Mt. San Antonio	4	–	3	–	0	5	–	3	–	1
San Bernardino	3	–	4	–	0	5	–	4	–	0
Citrus	2	–	5	–	0	3	–	6	–	0
Chaffey	2	–	5	–	0	2	–	7	–	0
Riverside	0	–	7	–	0	0	–	9	–	0
$ – Conference champion

1964 Golden Gate Conference football standings
	Conf.					Overall
Team	W		L		T	W		L		T
Chabot +	5	–	2	–	0	7	–	2	–	0
Contra Costa +	5	–	2	–	0	6	–	2	–	1
Merritt	4	–	2	–	1	5	–	3	–	1
CC of San Francisco	4	–	2	–	1	5	–	3	–	1
Foothill	4	–	3	–	0	5	–	4	–	0
San Jose City	2	–	5	–	0	2	–	7	–	0
San Mateo	2	–	5	–	0	2	–	7	–	0
Diablo Valley	1	–	6	–	0	2	–	6	–	1
+ – Conference co-champions

1964 Golden Valley Conference football standings
	Conf.					Overall
Team	W		L		T	W		L		T
Santa Rosa $	5	–	0	–	0	?	–	?	–	?
Napa	4	–	1	–	0	7	–	2	–	0
Sierra	3	–	2	–	0	?	–	?	–	?
Marin	1	–	4	–	0	?	–	?	–	?
Shasta	1	–	4	–	0	?	–	?	–	?
Yuba	1	–	4	–	0	?	–	?	–	?
$ – Conference champion

1964 Metropolitan Conference football standings
	Conf.					Overall
Team	W		L		T	W		L		T
Long Beach $	6	–	0	–	0	10	–	0	–	0
Bakersfield	5	–	1	–	0	8	–	2	–	0
El Camino	3	–	3	–	0	6	–	3	–	0
Cerritos	3	–	3	–	0	5	–	4	–	0
Los Angeles Valley	2	–	4	–	0	4	–	5	–	0
Santa Monica	2	–	4	–	0	4	–	5	–	0
East Los Angeles	0	–	6	–	0	1	–	8	–	0
$ – Conference champion

1964 Pacific Southwest Conference football standings
	Conf.					Overall
Team	W		L		T	W		L		T
San Diego Junior College $	4	–	0	–	0	9	–	1	–	0
Southwestern (CA)	3	–	1	–	0	6	–	3	–	0
San Diego Mesa	2	–	2	–	0	3	–	5	–	1
Palomar	1	–	3	–	0	3	–	6	–	0
Grossmont	0	–	4	–	0	1	–	8	–	0
$ – Conference champion

1964 South Central Conference (California) football standings
	Conf.					Overall
Team	W		L		T	W		L		T
Santa Barbara City $	4	–	0	–	0	7	–	3	–	0
Imperial Valley	3	–	1	–	0	6	–	3	–	0
Antelope Valley	2	–	2	–	0	3	–	4	–	1
Oceanside-Carlsbad	1	–	3	–	0	3	–	6	–	0
Desert	0	–	4	–	0	0	–	8	–	0
$ – Conference champion

1964 Valley Conference football standings
	Conf.					Overall
Team	W		L		T	W		L		T
Fresno City +	4	–	1	–	0	8	–	2	–	0
Sacramento City +	4	–	1	–	0	6	–	2	–	1
American River	3	–	2	–	0	7	–	2	–	0
Sequoias	3	–	2	–	0	6	–	2	–	1
San Joaquin Delta	1	–	4	–	0	5	–	4	–	0
Modesto	0	–	5	–	0	0	–	7	–	1
+ – Conference co-champions

1964 Western State Conference football standings
	Conf.					Overall
Team	W		L		T	W		L		T
Harbor $	6	–	0	–	0	9	–	0	–	0
Glendale (CA)	4	–	1	–	1	5	–	3	–	1
Ventura	4	–	2	–	0	6	–	4	–	0
Pierce	3	–	3	–	0	3	–	6	–	0
Pasadena	2	–	4	–	0	3	–	6	–	0
Los Angeles City	1	–	5	–	0	2	–	6	–	1
Compton	0	–	5	–	1	0	–	9	–	1
$ – Conference champion

=== NCJAA ===
1964 Empire Junior College Conference football standings
	Conf.					Overall
Team	W		L		T	W		L		T
McCook $	3	–	0	–	0	7	–	2	–	0
Northeastern (CO)	2	–	1	–	0	5	–	4	–	0
Trinidad	1	–	2	–	0	4	–	6	–	0
Scottsbluff	0	–	3	–	0	3	–	5	–	0
$ – Conference champion

1964 Intermountain Collegiate Athletic Conference football standings
	Conf.					Overall
Team	W		L		T	W		L		T
Dixie (UT) $	4	–	0	–	0	9	–	1	–	0
Boise	3	–	1	–	0	8	–	2	–	0
Snow	2	–	2	–	0	?	–	?	–	?
Ricks	1	–	3	–	0	?	–	?	–	?
Mesa (CO)	0	–	4	–	0	1	–	8	–	0
$ – Conference champion

1964 Interstate Conference football standings
	Conf.					Overall
Team	W		L		T	W		L		T
Joplin $	4	–	0	–	0	6	–	3	–	0
Fairbury	2	–	1	–	1	?	–	?	–	?
Highland	2	–	2	–	0	?	–	?	–	?
Haskell	1	–	2	–	1	2	–	4	–	2
Wentworth	0	–	4	–	0	?	–	?	–	?
$ – Conference champion

1964 Northern Illinois Junior College Conference football standings
	Conf.					Overall
Team	W		L		T	W		L		T
Thornton $	5	–	1	–	0	?	–	?	–	?
Wright	4	–	2	–	0	?	–	?	–	?
Joliet	3	–	3	–	0	?	–	?	–	?
Wilson	3	–	3	–	0	?	–	?	–	?
Morton	0	–	6	–	0	?	–	?	–	?
$ – Conference champion

1964 Oklahoma Junior College Conference football standings
	Conf.					Overall
Team	W		L		T	W		L		T
Oklahoma Military Academy $	7	–	1	–	0	9	–	3	–	0
Eastern Oklahoma A&M	4	–	3	–	1	5	–	3	–	1
Northern Oklahoma	4	–	4	–	0	5	–	4	–	0
Murray State (OK)	3	–	4	–	1	3	–	5	–	1
Connors	1	–	7	–	0	3	–	7	–	0
$ – Conference champion

1964 Texas Junior College Football Federation standings
	Conf.					Overall
Team	W		L		T	W		L		T
Texarkana $	6	–	1	–	1	7	–	3	–	1
Wharton	5	–	1	–	2	6	–	1	–	2
Henderson County	5	–	2	–	1	7	–	3	–	1
Kilgore	4	–	3	–	1	6	–	3	–	1
Navarro	4	–	4	–	0	4	–	5	–	0
Tyler	4	–	4	–	0	6	–	5	–	0
Cisco	2	–	3	–	3	2	–	4	–	3
Ranger	1	–	6	–	1	1	–	7	–	1
Blinn	0	–	7	–	1	0	–	8	–	1
$ – Conference champion

1964 Tri-State Junior College Conference football standings
	Conf.					Overall
Team	W		L		T	W		L		T
Ellsworth $	6	–	0	–	1	6	–	1	–	1
Mason City	6	–	1	–	0	6	–	1	–	0
Norfolk	5	–	2	–	0	6	–	2	–	0
Waldorf	4	–	3	–	0	?	–	?	–	?
Centerville	2	–	3	–	1	?	–	?	–	?
Worthington	2	–	5	–	0	?	–	?	–	?
Estherville	1	–	5	–	0	?	–	?	–	?
Fort Dodge	0	–	7	–	0	?	–	?	–	?
$ – Conference champion

1964 Washington Junior College Conference football standings
	Conf.					Overall
Team	W		L		T	W		L		T
Columbia Basin +	5	–	1	–	0	7	–	1	–	0
Yakima +	5	–	1	–	0	7	–	1	–	0
Grays Harbor	4	–	2	–	0	7	–	2	–	0
Everett	2	–	3	–	1	4	–	4	–	1
Wenatchee Valley	2	–	4	–	0	3	–	5	–	0
Olympic	1	–	3	–	2	3	–	4	–	2
Shoreline	0	–	5	–	1	1	–	7	–	1
+ – Conference co-champions
