= Haskell Indians football, 1963–1969 =

American college football seasons

The Haskell Indians football program from 1963 to 1969 represented the Haskell Institute—now known as Haskell Indian Nations University—in its first seven seasons of competition as a junior college, following a 16-year hiatus.

== 1963 ==
1963 Haskell Indians football
- Conference: Interstate Conference
- Record: 1–6–1 (1–3 Interstate)
- Head coach: H. E. (Lew) Llewellyn (1st season)
- Home stadium: Haskell Stadium

The 1963 Haskell Indians football team represented the Haskell Institute—now known as Haskell Indian Nations University—as a member of the Interstate Conference during the 1963 junior college football season. Led by first-year head coach H. E. (Lew) Llewellyn, the Indians compiled an overall record of 1–6–1 with a mark of 1–3 in conference play. Haskell had not fielded a football team since 1946 and competed at the junior college level for the first time.

=== Schedule ===
Date	Time	Opponent	Site	Result	Attendance	Source
September 13	7:30 p.m.	El Dorado*	Haskell Stadium; Lawrence, KS	T 12–12	2,500	
September 21		Highland	Haskell Stadium; Lawrence, KS	L 0–28		
September 28		at Fairbury	Fairbury, NE	L 21–36		
October 5		Ottawa (KS) JV*	Lawrence, KS	L 7–20		
October 12		at Parsons (KS)*	Parsons, KS	L 7–28		
October 17		Joplin^{†}	Lawrence, KS	L 6–25		
October 24		at Fort Scott*	Fort Scott, KS	L 13–32		
November 9		at Wentworth	Lexington, MO	W 26–19		
*Non-conference game; ^{†}Homecoming; All times are in Central time

== 1964 ==
1964 Haskell Indians football
- Conference: Interstate Conference
- Record: 2–4–2 (1–2–1 Interstate)
- Head coach: H. E. (Lew) Llewellyn (2nd season)
- Home stadium: Haskell Stadium

1964 Interstate Conference football standings
	Conf.					Overall
Team	W		L		T	W		L		T
Joplin $	4	–	0	–	0	6	–	3	–	0
Fairbury	2	–	1	–	1	?	–	?	–	?
Highland	2	–	2	–	0	?	–	?	–	?
Haskell	1	–	2	–	1	2	–	4	–	2
Wentworth	0	–	4	–	0	?	–	?	–	?
$ – Conference champion

The 1964 Haskell Indians football team represented the Haskell Institute—now known as Haskell Indian Nations University—as a member of the Interstate Conference during the 1964 junior college football season. Led by second-year head coach H. E. (Lew) Llewellyn, the Indians compiled an overall record of 2–4–2 with a mark of 1–2–1 in conference play, placing fourth in the Interstate Conference.

=== Schedule ===
Date	Opponent	Site	Result	Source
September 11	at El Dorado*	El Dorado, KS	L 7–32	
September 19	at Highland	Highland, KS	L 0–49	
September 26	Fairbury	Haskell Stadium; Lawrence, KS	T 6–6	
October 2	Ottawa (KS) JV*	Haskell Stadium; Lawrence, KS	T 20–20	
October 9	Fort Scott*	Haskell Stadium; Lawrence, KS	L 28–47	
October 17	at Joplin	Joplin, MO	L 7–37	
October 29	at Kemper*	Boonville, MO	W 26–0	
November 6	Wentworth	Lawrence, KS	W 38–21	
*Non-conference game
