= James Sellers =

James Sellers may refer to:

- James M. Sellers (1895–1990), commandant, superintendent and president of Wentworth Military Academy
- James M. Sellers Jr. (1929–1993), superintendent of Wentworth Military Academy

== See also ==
- James Sellars (1843–1888), Scottish architect
