= Lester B. Wikoff =

Colonel Lester Bascom Wikoff (1893–1978) served as the fifth Superintendent of Wentworth Military Academy in Lexington, Missouri, from 1960 to 1971.

Lester B. Wikoff was born in West Union, Ohio, on December 9, 1893. From 1911 to 1915, he attended the University of Missouri, where he lettered in football for the Tigers, and earned a Bachelor of Arts and a Bachelor of Science in education. He arrived at Wentworth fresh out of college, teaching Latin and English and coaching football, basketball and baseball. Over the next 56 years, he would occupy almost every position and play a key role in catapulting the Academy to national prominence. He became Athletic Director in 1917, and added the duties of Director of Enrollment and Quartermaster in 1928. He served as Business Manager, Secretary and Treasurer from 1935 to 1960, running the school in partnership with Superintendent James M. Sellers. Sellers and Wikoff were co-owners of Wentworth from 1935 to 1951, when Wikoff oversaw the school's re-organization as a non-profit institution. From 1960 to 1971, he served as Superintendent, a period during which the school had unparalleled enrollment, averaging over 600 students a year. It was under his guidance that the Scholastic Building, Chapel, Sandford Sellers Hall, and the Field House were constructed.

Beyond Wentworth, Wikoff served as president of the Lexington Chamber of Commerce, as district governor of Rotary International, and as an elder in the Presbyterian Church. He was a district chairman of the Boy Scouts of America, receiving the Silver Beaver Award and being named Chieftain of the Mic-O-Say Tribe. He was In 1949-50, he served as president of the Missouri Chamber of Commerce, in 1960-61, he served as Vice President of the National Pony Express Centennial Association, and in 1963-64, as president of the Independent Schools Association of the Central States. He also organized one of the first Civil War re-enactments in the United States, when the Wentworth Cadet Corps re-fought the Battle of the Hemp Bales before a huge crowd in Lexington in 1955.

Wikoff died on January 4, 1978, in Lexington.
