= Ovid R. Sellers =

American academic and minister (1884–1975)

Ovid Rogers Sellers (August 12, 1884 – July 7, 1975) was an internationally known Old Testament scholar and archaeologist who played a role in the discovery of the Dead Sea Scrolls. He served as Professor of the Old Testament and Dean of McCormick Theological Seminary in Chicago, Illinois from 1924 to 1954.

== Early life ==
Ovid Sellers was born in his mother's hometown of Waco, Texas, in 1884, and grew up on the campus of Wentworth Military Academy in Lexington, Missouri, where his father, Sandford Sellers, was superintendent. He graduated from Wentworth at age 13, the youngest in the history of the school. He earned an A.B. from the University of Chicago in 1904, a B.D. from McCormick Theological Seminary, becoming an ordained Presbyterian minister, in 1914, and a Ph.D. from Johns Hopkins University in 1922. His studies concentrated largely on the Old Testament and ancient languages, including Greek, Latin, Hebrew, Aramaic, Egyptian Hieroglyphics, Syriac, and Akkadian Cuneiform.

Ovid returned to Wentworth to fill positions at the academy while pursuing his education, serving variously as instructor (1905–06, 1910–12), coach, and headmaster (1919–21). He also was the editor of the local paper, the Lexington Intelligencer News, from 1907 to 1911. In World War I, he served as a chaplain and First Lieutenant in the 17th Field Artillery, Second Division, AEF.

== Career ==
=== Dean of McCormick Theological Seminary ===
After getting his doctorate from Johns Hopkins, Sellers became a professor of the Old Testament at McCormick Theological Seminary, serving in that position from 1924 to 1954, and as Dean from 1934 to 1954. He periodically served as a visiting professor at the University of Chicago.

=== Discovery of the Dead Sea Scrolls ===
He was Director of the American Schools of Oriental Research in Jerusalem in 1948-49 and was immediately thrust into the discovery of the Dead Sea Scrolls. In early September 1948, Mar Samuel, Metropolitan and Archbishop of the Syriac Orthodox Church, who had acquired the first four scrolls soon after their discovery in 1947, showed Sellers some additional scroll fragments that he had acquired. A few weeks later, on September 23, Sellers boarded a small twin engine Arab Airways biplane, flying from Beirut to Amman. Travel was very dangerous. The British mandate in Palestine had ended on the previous May 15. War broke out immediately, and peace would not be restored until November. While en route, Sellers's plane was intercepted and attacked by an Israeli fighter aircraft, forcing it to crash-land in Transjordan territory. Three of the six on board were killed, with Sellers suffering severe burns as one of the survivors. A United Nations investigation led by Ralph J. Bunche found that the Provisional government of Israel was "responsible for a serious breach of the terms of the Truce as a result of unjustified attacks made by an Israeli fighter aircraft upon the Transjordan aircraft, resulting in the deaths of three persons, burns and injuries to three other persons, as well as the destruction of the attacked aircraft, and the incursion upon Transjordan territory by the Israeli fighter aircraft." (In 1950, Bunche would be awarded the Nobel Peace Prize for his efforts to bring peace to Palestine.)

Sellers recuperated and returned to his job within a few weeks. By the end of 1948, nearly two years after the discovery of the scrolls, no scholar had yet located the cave where the fragments had been found. With the unrest in the country, no large-scale search could be undertaken. Sellers attempted to get the Syrians to help locate the cave, but they demanded more money than Sellers could offer. The cave was finally discovered on January 28, 1949, by a U.N. observer, and Sellers brought his box Brownie camera to take the first photos of the cave, which were soon published in Life Magazine. In an attempt to date the scrolls, Sellers took some linen found in the cave, presumably from an outer wrapping of the scrolls, and brought it back to the University of Chicago. Unfortunately, the carbon-14 test, done at Chicago in 1950, was inconclusive, with a range from 245 B.C. to 245 A.D. It was later found that the carbon-14 test's margin of error was 500 years.

Sellers was a staff member on 10 archaeological expeditions in Palestine, three of which he directed.

== Retirement and personal life ==
He retired from McCormick in 1954, and he and Mrs. Sellers moved to Santa Fe, New Mexico, the following year. He served as a lecturer at the School of Theology in Djakarta, Indonesia, in 1955, and returned to the American Schools of Oriental Research in 1957-58 as Professor of Archaeology.

He and Katherine (Wilson) Sellers had been married since June 1, 1918. They had three children: Roger Sellers, Elizabeth "Betty" Sellers Harter and Lucia Sellers Butler, and eight grandchildren.

== Death ==
Ovid Rogers Sellers died in his hometown of Lexington, Missouri, on July 7, 1975, at age 90. He is buried in Machpelah Cemetery in Lexington.

== Publications ==
- The Citadel of Beth Zur, a Preliminary Report of the First Excavation Conducted By the Presbyterian Theological Seminary, Chicago, and the American School of Oriental Research, Jerusalem, in 1931 at Khirbat et Tubeiqa. Ovid R. Sellers. Westminster Press, 1933.
- Biblical Hebrew for beginners, by Ovid R. Sellers & Edwin Edgar Voigt; Publisher: Chicago, Blessing Book Stores, inc., 1941.
- Westminster Study Edition of the Bible, with maps. Dr. Floyd V. Filson (New Testament), Dr. Ovid R. Sellers (Old Testament). Westminster Press. 1948.
- Genesis Rhymes: Words, Music and Illustrations. Ovid Rogers Sellers. Publisher: McCormick Cooperative Store.
- A Roman-Byzantine burial cave in northern Palestine (The joint excavation of ASOR and McCormick Theol. Sem. at Silet edh-Dhahr). Ovid R. Sellers of McCormick Theological Seminary; and Dimitri Baramki New Haven: ASOR, 1953.
- The Fifth Quarter Century at McCormick, 1929–1954. McCormick Theological Seminary, 1955.
- 1957 Excavation at Beth-Zur. Ovid R. Sellers, et al. Cambridge: American Schools of Oriental Research, 1957.
- The Monuments And The Old Testament. by Ira Manrice Price; Ovid R. Sellers; E. Leslie Carlson. The Judson Press, Philadelphia, Pa. 1958.
