= Elmo M. Haney =

US Marine sergeant (1898–1979)

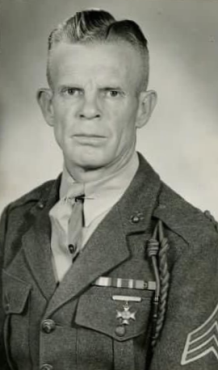
- Haney in 1941
- Born: St. Elmo Murray Haney; April 1898; Chickalah, Arkansas, U.S.
- Died: January 31, 1979 (aged 80); Fayetteville, Arkansas, U.S.
- Burial place: Benton County Memorial Cemetery
- Education: Arkansas State Normal School; Chillicothe Business College
- Spouse: Ethel T. Haney (died 1972)
- Military career
- Allegiance: United States
- Branch: United States Marine Corps
- Service years: 1918–1919; 1927–1947
- Rank: Technical sergeant
- Nickname: Pop
- Units: 3rd Marine Division; 1st Marine Division
- Conflicts: World War I; Banana Wars; Occupation of Nicaragua; World War II; Occupation of Iceland; Battle of Guadalcanal; Battle of Cape Gloucester; Battle of Talasea; Battle of Peleliu
- Awards: Silver Star

St. Elmo Murray Haney (April 1898 – January 31, 1979) was a senior non-commissioned officer in the United States Marine Corps. As a veteran of many early campaigns in the Marine Corps, he was considered the epitome of the "old breed" Marine and a source of inspiration during the tough battles of the Pacific Campaign in World War II. Author and fellow Marine Eugene Sledge described Haney as "not a man born of woman, but that God had issued him to the Marine Corps."

== Early life and education ==
Haney was born in Chickalah, Arkansas. Before and after his service during World War I, Haney attended the Arkansas State Normal School, a teacher training college, where he played on the baseball team. He later graduated from Chillicothe Business College in Chillicothe, Missouri.

== Military career ==
=== World War I ===
Haney enlisted in the United States Marine Corps on July 17, 1918, and trained at Parris Island, South Carolina, and Quantico, Virginia. By October 1918, he had been assigned to the 2nd Separate Machine Gun Battalion at Quantico. Although multiple sources, including Eugene Sledge, claim that Haney saw combat in World War I, the war ended before Haney could be sent to Europe. On May 16, 1919, he was transferred to Marine Barracks in Boston and discharged.

=== Inter-war period ===
After teaching school in Arkansas for four years, Haney re-enlisted in the Marine Corps on October 22, 1927, in Kansas City, Missouri. By 1930, he was stationed in Shanghai and played in the outfield for the 4th Marine Regiment baseball team. In 1933, he was transferred from Marine Corps Base San Diego to Marine Barracks Mare Island, also playing on the baseball team there. Haney also saw duty in United States occupation of Nicaragua.

=== World War II ===
Before the official American entry into World War II, Haney participated in the Allied occupation of Iceland in mid-1941. In early 1942, he was stationed with the aviation technicians of 17th Provisional Marine Company in Belém, Brazil.

In the Pacific Theater, Haney fought in the battles of Guadalcanal, Cape Gloucester, Talasea, and Peleliu with Company K, 3rd Battalion, 5th Marines, where he was one of the oldest to fight in the regiment. Haney held the rank of platoon sergeant and was assigned to company headquarters, serving as a roving senior combat leader in the company.

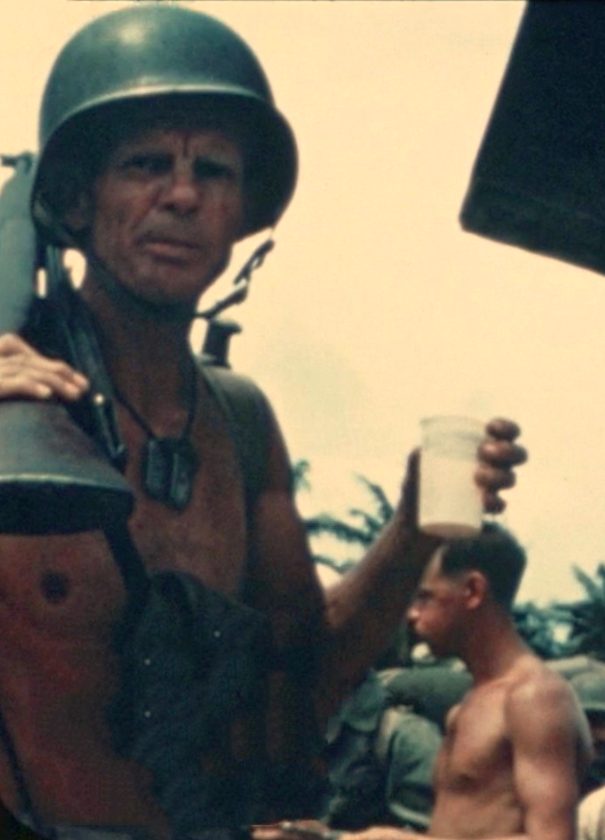
Haney on Pavuvu, November 1944

Eugene Sledge noted many eccentric "old breed" behaviors from Haney, including scrubbing his genitals with a stiff brush, field stripping and cleaning his rifle compulsively, talking to himself, and being "obsessed with bayoneting the enemy." Sledge witnessed Haney, a non-commissioned officer, angrily throw coral gravel into the face of a second lieutenant, furiously berating him for not keeping his pistol pointed downrange during a firing exercise. During battle, Sledge described Haney as "everywhere at once, correcting mistakes and helping out." A Collier's magazine article chronicling the Marines' action at Cape Gloucester called Haney "a leathery little man, a stickler for discipline, as rigid as a ramrod, a man who knows the book backward."

At the Battle of Peleliu, Haney rallied his Marines as they got bogged down and kept them moving forward. At the conclusion of the fighting, Sledge asked Haney what he thought of the battle as they shared a cigarette, looking at Peleliu from their ship's railing:

Instead of the usual old salt comment—something like, "You think that was bad, you oughta been in the old Corps,"—Haney answered with an unexpected, "Boy, that was terrible! I ain't never seen nothin' like it. I'm ready to go back to the States. I've had enough after that."

Haney shipped out of Peleliu on November 29, 1944, and was transferred stateside after being promoted to gunnery sergeant. He retired from active duty in October 1947 at the rank of technical sergeant. (Note: In December 1946, the Marine Corps eliminated the rank of gunnery sergeant, merging it with five other ranks into technical sergeant, at the second highest pay grade of E-2. Another reorganization of the ranks in 1958 restored gunnery sergeant to the rank structure.)

=== Silver Star citation ===
At the Battle of Cape Gloucester, Haney received a Silver Star for heroic actions against the enemy, carrying ammunition to the front lines during the thickest of the fighting for Walt's Ridge. The citation reads:

The President of the United States of America takes pleasure in presenting the Silver Star to Platoon Sergeant St. Elmo M. Haney (MCSN: 131228), United States Marine Corps, for conspicuous gallantry and intrepidity while serving with the FIRST Marine Division in action against enemy Japanese forces on Cape Gloucester, New Britain on January 10, 1944. While our forces were engaged in bitter hand-to-hand combat defending a vital ridge, Platoon Sergeant Haney courageously led an ammunition carrying party through dark jungle undergrowth and driving rain to deliver supplies to our front lines, arriving five minutes before the last desperate counter attack when one platoon was completely out of ammunition and the entire line was low. By his expeditious delivery of the urgently needed supplies, he enabled our units to defend their position successfully. Platoon Sergeant Haney's daring initiative and selfless devotion to duty in the face of grave peril were in keeping with the highest traditions of the United States Naval Service.

== Death and legacy ==
Ethel, Haney's wife, died on July 14, 1972, in Bentonville, Arkansas. Haney died January 31, 1979, in Fayetteville, Arkansas, and was buried in Benton County Memorial Cemetery in Rogers, Arkansas.

In 2010, Haney was portrayed by actor Gary Sweet in three episodes of the HBO miniseries The Pacific. Haney's character in the series was built largely from recollections in Eugene Sledge's memoir With the Old Breed: At Peleliu and Okinawa.
