= Chuck O'Neil =

American football player (1898–1928)

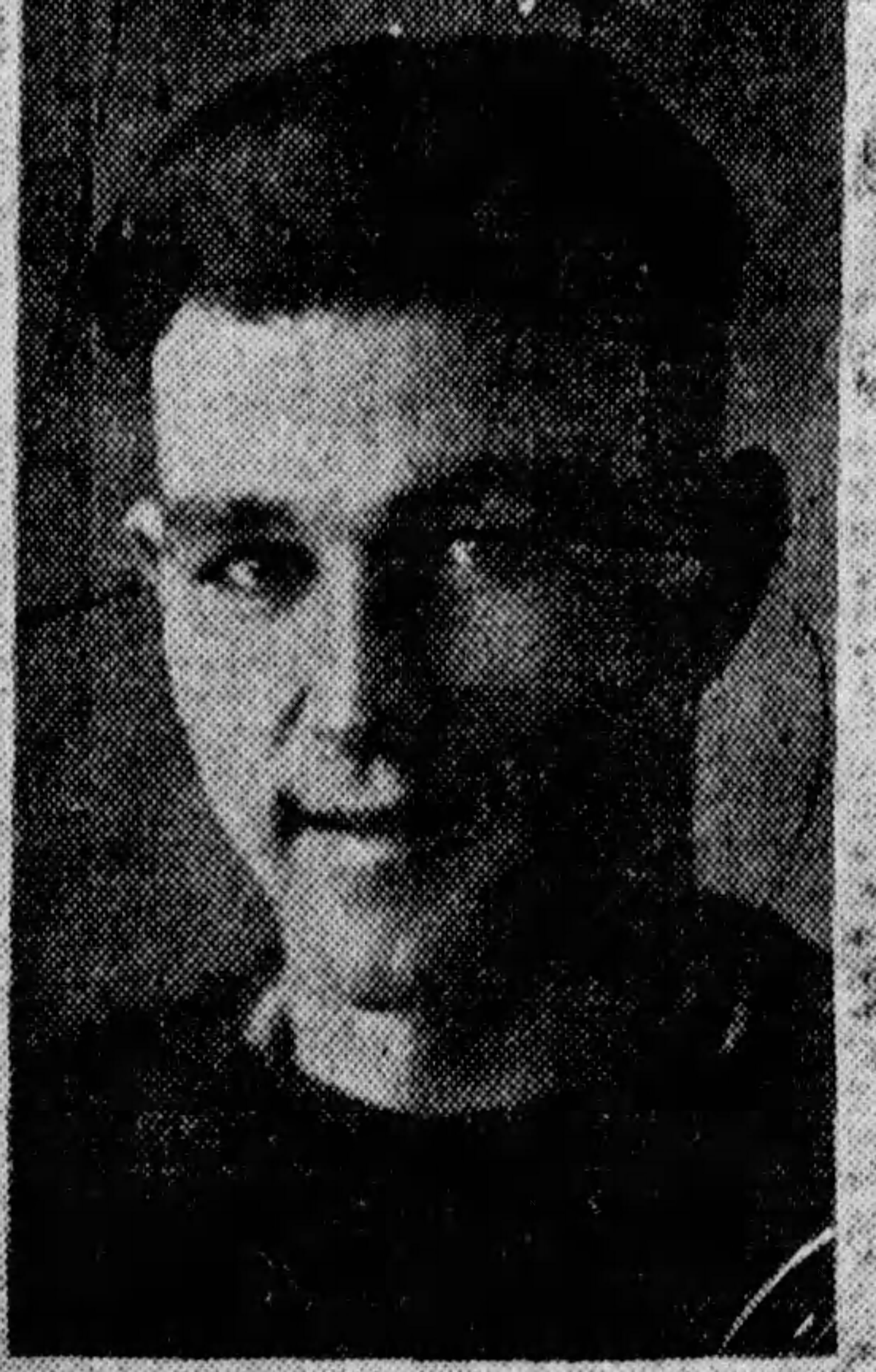
- O'Neil, 1921

Profile
- Positions: End, back

Personal information
- Born: March 25, 1898; Michigan, U.S.
- Died: June 28, 1928 (aged 30)
- Listed height: 5 ft 10 in (1.78 m)
- Listed weight: 180 lb (82 kg)

Career information
- High school: Michigan Military Academy
- College: 32nd Infantry Division (1918); Phillips (1919); Chillicothe Business College (1920)

Career history
- Evansville Crimson Giants (1921–1922); Toledo Maroons (1922–1923)

Career NFL statistics
- Games played: 9
- Stats at Pro Football Reference

Charles Leo O'Neil (March 25, 1898 – June 20, 1928) was an American football player. He played military service football for the 32nd Infantry Division football team in 1918, college football for the Phillips Haymakers in 1919 and for Chillicothe Business College in 1920, and professional football in the National Football League (NFL) for the Evansville Crimson Giants (1921–1922) and Toledo Maroons (1922–1923).

== Early years and military service ==
O'Neil was born in 1898 or 1900 in Ann Arbor, Michigan. He attended the Michigan Military Academy in Orchard Lake Village, Michigan.

During World War I, O'Neil served in the 32nd Infantry Division (known in France as Les Terribles). He spent more than 15 months in France. In the fall of 1918, he played for the 32nd Division football team that was the runner-up in the American Expeditionary Forces football finals.

== College football ==
O'Neil played college football for the Phillips Haymakers of Enid, Oklahoma. He played at the end position for the 1919 Phillips Haymakers football team that compiled an undefeated 10–0–1 record. The Haymakers were led by another Ann Arbor native, John Maulbetsch. O'Neil was described by an Enid newspaper as one of "the most interesting and promising men" on the Phillips team and "a whiz at snagging passes and breaking up interference, in fact all that a good end should be."

In 1920, O'Neil transferred to Chillicothe Business College and was elected captain or its football team. He was described by a Chillicothe newspaper as "one of the strongest players on the squad" and "one of the most popular students in the school"

== Professional football ==
In September 1921, O'Neil tried out with the Evansville Crimson Giants of the National Football League (NFL). He made the team, playing at the right end position. He was described by The Evansville Journal in October 1921 as" "Irish, and the fleetest right end in the business. Watch him grab those forward passes."

O'Neil began the 1922 season with Evansville but finished the season with the Toledo Maroons. He played for Toledo in 1922 and 1923. Over three NFL seasons, O'Neil appeared in nine games, six as a starter.

== Death ==
O'Neil died in June 1928 in New Mexico. His body was returned to Ann Arbor for burial.
