= List of NC State Wolfpack in the NFL draft =

This is a List of NC State Wolfpack football players in the NFL draft.

== Key ==
B	Back	K	Kicker	NT	Nose tackle
C	Center	LB	Linebacker	FB	Fullback
DB	Defensive back	P	Punter	HB	Halfback
DE	Defensive end	QB	Quarterback	WR	Wide receiver
DT	Defensive tackle	RB	Running back	G	Guard
E	End	OT	Offensive tackle	TE	Tight end

== Selections ==
Year	Round	Pick	Overall	Player	Team	Position
1937	10	6	96	Dom Mac Cara	Washington Redskins	E
1938	12	3	103	Lou Mark	Brooklyn Dodgers	C
1940	7	4	54	Ty Coon	Brooklyn Dodgers	T
1940	17	3	153	Mike Sullivan	Pittsburgh Steelers	E
1943	13	7	117	Pete Boltrek	Pittsburgh Steelers	T
1943	23	4	214	W. J. Gibson	Brooklyn Dodgers	E
1944	7	11	65	Mike Andrews	Boston Yanks	E
1944	19	11	197	Art Faircloth	Boston Yanks	B
1944	30	1	308	Lloyd Ott	Chicago Cardinals	C
1947	7	5	50	Howard Turner	Chicago Cardinals	B
1947	10	3	78	Paul Gibson	Pittsburgh Steelers	E
1947	22	5	200	George Blomquist	Philadelphia Eagles	E
1948	20	5	180	Jim Rees	Los Angeles Rams	T
1948	27	7	252	Bill Stanton	Philadelphia Eagles	E
1950	22	10	284	Jim Byler	Chicago Bears	G
1952	4	2	39	Elmer Costa	Cleveland Browns	G
1952	14	3	160	Tom Tofaute	Chicago Cardinals	C
1952	22	6	259	Jim O'Rourke	Washington Redskins	B
1953	11	2	123	Alex Webster	Washington Redskins	B
1954	20	11	240	Hugh Pierce	Cleveland Browns	C
1956	17	12	205	Eddie West	Cleveland Browns	QB
1957	20	6	235	John Szuehan	Pittsburgh Steelers	T
1958	3	2	27	Dick Christy	Green Bay Packers	B
1958	11	5	126	Darrell Dess	Washington Redskins	T
1958	23	6	271	Ken Trowbridge	Pittsburgh Steelers	B
1959	10	10	118	Bob Pepe	New York Giants	E
1959	12	11	143	Frank Palandrani	Cleveland Browns	T
1959	20	12	240	Paul Balonick	Baltimore Colts	C
1960	18	4	208	John Lawrence	Washington Redskins	G
1961	3	5	33	Claude Gibson	Chicago Bears	B
1961	12	7	161	Dick Reynolds	Baltimore Colts	T
1961	18	14	252	Nick Maravich	Philadelphia Eagles	T
1962	1	1	1	Roman Gabriel	Oakland Raiders	QB
1962	1	2	2	Roman Gabriel	Los Angeles Rams	QB
1962	11	3	143	Bert Wilder	Los Angeles Rams	T
1965	12	12	166	Glen Sasser	St. Louis Cardinals	E
1966	7	10	105	Dave Ellis	Baltimore Colts	DE
1966	19	10	285	Tony Golmont	St. Louis Cardinals	DB
1967	12	3	293	Bill Gentry	Atlanta Falcons	LB
1967	12	22	312	Harold Deters	Dallas Cowboys	K
1967	16	24	417	Charles Noggle	Kansas City Chiefs	RB
1967	17	2	421	Gary Rowe	New York Giants	RB
1968	1	6	6	Dennis Byrd	Boston Patriots	DT
1968	13	18	345	Fred Combs	San Diego Chargers	DB
1968	15	4	385	Art McMahon	Boston Patriots	DB
1969	10	18	252	Gerald Warren	St. Louis Cardinals	K
1969	11	1	261	Bobby Hall	Buffalo Bills	RB
1969	16	21	411	Henry Hipps	Los Angeles Rams	LB
1970	2	6	32	Ron Carpenter	Cincinnati Bengals	DT
1971	13	11	323	Ed Nicholas	Chicago Bears	T
1973	15	14	378	Mahlon Williams	New York Jets	TE
1974	1	22	22	Charley Young	Dallas Cowboys	RB
1974	6	9	139	Willie Burden	Detroit Lions	RB
1974	6	20	150	Rick Druschel	Pittsburgh Steelers	G
1974	7	9	165	Allen Sitterle	Pittsburgh Steelers	T
1975	4	19	97	Stan Fritts	Cincinnati Bengals	RB
1975	10	19	253	Roland Hooks	Buffalo Bills	RB
1975	14	13	351	Frank Haywood	Cincinnati Bengals	DT
1976	12	7	326	Don Buckey	New York Jets	WR
1976	12	8	327	Dave Buckey	New York Jets	QB
1978	2	11	39	Johnny Evans	Cleveland Browns	P
1978	6	24	162	Elijah Marshall	Tampa Bay Buccaneers	WR
1978	9	4	226	Richard Carter	New Orleans Saints	DB
1979	1	16	16	Ted Brown	Minnesota Vikings	RB
1979	12	7	310	Tim Gillespie	New York Giants	G
1980	1	16	16	Jim Ritcher	Buffalo Bills	C
1980	6	2	140	Chris Dieterich	Detroit Lions	T
1980	10	1	250	Woodrow Wilson	Pittsburgh Steelers	DB
1980	11	21	298	Lee Jukes	Philadelphia Eagles	WR
1980	12	20	325	Chuck Stone	Miami Dolphins	G
1981	6	11	149	Bubba Green	Baltimore Colts	DT
1981	8	19	212	Lin Dawson	New England Patriots	TE
1982	1	20	20	Mike Quick	Philadelphia Eagles	WR
1982	3	22	77	Robert Abraham	Houston Oilers	LB
1982	8	26	221	Dwight Sullivan	Dallas Cowboys	RB
1982	10	26	277	Todd Eckerson	Dallas Cowboys	T
1983	6	24	164	Eric Williams	Pittsburgh Steelers	DB
1983	7	10	178	Perry Williams	New York Giants	DB
1984u	1	15	15	Vaughan Johnson	New Orleans Saints	LB
1985	5	6	118	Joe McIntosh	Detroit Lions	RB
1985	5	21	133	Frank Bush	Houston Oilers	LB
1986	3	14	69	Joe Milinichik	Detroit Lions	T
1986	7	22	188	Raymond Phillips	Denver Broncos	LB
1986	12	10	315	Reggie Singletary	Philadelphia Eagles	DE
1986	12	24	329	Rickey Isom	Miami Dolphins	RB
1987	1	20	20	Haywood Jeffires	Houston Oilers	WR
1987	5	3	115	Nelson Jones	San Diego Chargers	DB
1988	11	11	288	Izel Jenkins	Philadelphia Eagles	DB
1989	2	5	33	Danny Peebles	Tampa Bay Buccaneers	WR
1989	3	4	60	Naz Worthern	Kansas City Chiefs	WR
1990	1	10	10	Ray Agnew	New England Patriots	DE
1990	3	22	75	Bobby Houston	Green Bay Packers	LB
1991	2	5	32	Mike Jones	Phoenix Cardinals	DE
1991	2	21	48	Jesse Campbell	Philadelphia Eagles	DB
1991	4	22	105	Joe Johnson	Chicago Bears	DB
1991	7	17	184	Fernandus Vinson	Cincinnati Bengals	DB
1991	12	2	308	Elijah Austin	Cleveland Browns	DT
1992	4	5	89	Mark Thomas	San Francisco 49ers	DE
1992	4	10	94	Charles Davenport	Pittsburgh Steelers	WR
1992	5	22	134	Todd Harrison	Chicago Bears	TE
1992	12	22	330	Scott Adell	New Orleans Saints	T
1993	3	21	77	Mike Reid	Philadelphia Eagles	DB
1993	5	27	139	Sebastian Savage	Buffalo Bills	DB
1993	7	23	191	David Merritt	Miami Dolphins	LB
1994	1	18	18	Dewayne Washington	Minnesota Vikings	DB
1994	3	30	95	Gary Downs	New York Giants	RB
1994	3	37	102	George Hegamin	Dallas Cowboys	T
1995	3	32	96	Damien Covington	Buffalo Bills	LB
1995	5	14	148	William Strong	New Orleans Saints	DB
1995	6	27	198	Carl Reeves	Chicago Bears	DE
1995	6	32	203	Eddie Goines	Seattle Seahawks	WR
1997	6	12	175	Rod Brown	Arizona Cardinals	RB
1998	4	31	123	Carlos King	Pittsburgh Steelers	RB
1998	7	3	192	Alvis Whitted	Jacksonville Jaguars	WR
1999	1	6	6	Torry Holt	St. Louis Rams	WR
1999	4	9	104	Jason Perry	San Diego Chargers	DB
2000	3	2	64	Lloyd Harrison	Washington Redskins	DB
2000	6	13	179	Tony Scott	New York Jets	DB
2001	1	9	9	Koren Robinson	Seattle Seahawks	WR
2001	3	2	64	Adrian Wilson	Arizona Cardinals	DB
2002	2	17	49	Levar Fisher	Arizona Cardinals	LB
2002	4	7	105	Brian Williams	Minnesota Vikings	DB
2003	5	2	137	Terrence Holt	Detroit Lions	DB
2003	7	1	215	Scott Kooistra	Cincinnati Bengals	T
2004	1	4	4	Philip Rivers	New York Giants	QB
2004	3	21	84	Sean Locklear	Seattle Seahawks	G
2004	4	12	108	Jerricho Cotchery	New York Jets	WR
2005	3	27	91	Chris Colmer	Tampa Bay Buccaneers	T
2005	5	25	161	Andre Maddox	New York Jets	DB
2005	6	20	194	Pat Thomas	Jacksonville Jaguars	LB
2006	1	1	1	Mario Williams	Houston Texans	DE
2006	1	22	22	Manny Lawson	San Francisco 49ers	LB
2006	1	26	26	John McCargo	Buffalo Bills	DT
2006	4	19	116	Stephen Tulloch	Tennessee Titans	LB
2006	6	23	192	Marcus Hudson	San Francisco 49ers	DB
2006	6	33	202	T. J. Williams	Tampa Bay Buccaneers	TE
2007	3	19	82	DeMarcus Tyler	Kansas City Chiefs	DT
2007	4	6	105	A. J. Davis	Detroit Lions	DB
2007	4	16	115	Leroy Harris	Tennessee Titans	C
2008	3	19	82	DaJuan Morgan	Kansas City Chiefs	DB
2008	5	9	144	DeMario Pressley	New Orleans Saints	DT
2009	4	22	122	Anthony Hill	Houston Texans	TE
2009	4	29	129	Andre Brown	New York Giants	RB
2010	6	36	205	Ted Larsen	New England Patriots	C
2010	7	6	213	Willie Young	Detroit Lions	DE
2011	3	3	67	Nate Irving	Denver Broncos	LB
2012	3	6	69	T. J. Graham	Buffalo Bills	WR
2012	3	12	75	Russell Wilson	Seattle Seahawks	QB
2012	5	28	163	Terrell Manning	Green Bay Packers	LB
2012	7	3	210	Audie Cole	Minnesota Vikings	LB
2012	7	18	225	J. R. Sweezy	Seattle Seahawks	DE
2012	7	32	239	Brian Slay	Washington Redskins	DT
2013	2	19	51	David Amerson	Washington Redskins	DB
2013	3	11	73	Mike Glennon	Tampa Bay Buccaneers	QB
2013	5	3	136	Earl Wolff	Philadelphia Eagles	DB
2014	4	29	129	Dontae Johnson	San Francisco 49ers	DB
2016	3	15	78	Joe Thuney	New England Patriots	G
2016	3	29	91	Jacoby Brissett	New England Patriots	QB
2016	4	20	118	Juston Burris	New York Jets	DB
2017	2	29	61	Josh Jones	Green Bay Packers	DB
2017	7	27	245	Jack Tocho	Minnesota Vikings	DB
2017	7	34	252	Matthew Dayes	Cleveland Browns	RB
2018	1	5	5	Bradley Chubb	Denver Broncos	DE
2018	3	5	69	B. J. Hill	New York Giants	DT
2018	3	20	84	Justin Jones	Los Angeles Chargers	DT
2018	4	4	104	Nyheim Hines	Indianapolis Colts	RB
2018	4	28	128	Kentavius Street	San Francisco 49ers	DE
2018	4	29	129	Will Richardson	Jacksonville Jaguars	T
2018	5	28	165	Jaylen Samuels	Pittsburgh Steelers	FB
2019	1	18	18	Garrett Bradbury	Minnesota Vikings	C
2019	3	8	72	Germaine Pratt	Cincinnati Bengals	LB
2019	4	2	104	Ryan Finley	Cincinnati Bengals	QB
2019	6	34	206	Kelvin Harmon	Washington Redskins	WR
2020	5	28	174	Larrell Murchison	Tennessee Titans	DT
2020	7	15	229	James Smith-Williams	Washington Redskins	DE
2021	3	8	72	Alim McNeill	Detroit Lions	DT
2022	1	6	6	Ikem Ekwonu	Carolina Panthers	T
2022	7	34	255	Trenton Gill	Chicago Bears	P
2023	4	12	114	Chandler Zavala	Carolina Panthers	G
2024	3	34	98	Payton Wilson	Pittsburgh Steelers	LB
2024	6	14	190	Dylan McMahon	Philadelphia Eagles	G
2024	6	42	218	Devin Leary	Baltimore Ravens	QB
2025	2	22	54	Anthony Belton	Green Bay Packers	T
2026	5	12	152	Justin Joly	Denver Broncos	TE
2026	7	13	229	Brandon Cleveland	Las Vegas Raiders	DT

== Notable undrafted players ==
Note: No drafts held before 1920

Debut year	Player name	Position	Debut NFL/AFL team	Notes
1987	Mike Cofer	PK	Cleveland Browns	—
1987	Frank Harris	RB	Chicago Bears	—
1987	Erik Kramer	QB	New Orleans Saints	—
1987	Derrick Taylor	DB	New Orleans Saints	—
2022	Vi Jones	LB	Seattle Seahawks	—
2022	Zonovan Knight	RB	New York Jets	—
2022	Ricky Person Jr.	RB	Baltimore Ravens	—
2023	Christopher Dunn	PK	Los Angeles Rams	—
2023	Tanner Ingle	S	Los Angeles Rams	—
2023	Derrek Pitts	CB	Tampa Bay Buccaneers	—
2023	Drake Thomas	LB	Las Vegas Raiders	—
2023	Thayer Thomas	WR	Minnesota Vikings	—
2024	Robert Kennedy	DB	Los Angeles Chargers	—
2024	Brayden Narveson	PK	Tennessee Titans	—
2024	Joe Shimko	LS	Arizona Cardinals	—
2025	Zeke Correll	C	Minnesota Vikings	—
2025	Timothy McKay	G	Washington Commanders	—
2025	Jordan Waters	RB	Los Angeles Rams	—
2025	Aydan White	CB	Jacksonville Jaguars	—
2026	Sean Brown	LB	Tennessee Titans	—
2026	Caden Fordham	LB	Tampa Bay Buccaneers	—
2026	Wesley Grimes	WR	San Francisco 49ers	—
2026	Cody Hardy	TE	New Orleans Saints	—
2026	Sabastian Harsh	DE	Houston Texans	—
2026	Devon Marshall	CB	Jacksonville Jaguars	—
2026	Cian Slone	DE	Las Vegas Raiders	—

== Notes ==
Vaughan Johnson was drafted in the 1984 NFL Supplemental Draft.
