= Greg Barton (gridiron football) =

American football player (1946–2019)

No. 12, 14, 18, 8
- Position: Quarterback

Personal information
- Born: July 14, 1946; Denver, Colorado, U.S.
- Died: August 26, 2019 (aged 73); Beaverton, Oregon, U.S.
- Listed height: 6 ft 2 in (1.88 m)
- Listed weight: 195 lb (88 kg)

Career information
- High school: Robert A. Millikan (Long Beach, California)
- College: Long Beach CC (1964-1965); Tulsa (1966-1967)
- NFL draft: 1968: 9th round, 229th overall pick

Career history

Playing
- Michigan Arrows (1968); Detroit Lions (1968–1970); Toronto Argonauts (1971–1972); Portland Storm (1974)

Coaching
- Portland Thunder (1975) Head coach
- Stats at Pro Football Reference

Greg Lee Barton (July 14, 1946 – August 26, 2019) was an American football quarterback in the National Football League (NFL) who played for the Detroit Lions. He was traded from the Lions to the Philadelphia Eagles for a 1971 second-round selection (30th overall–Dave Thompson) and 1972 second- and third-round picks (40th and 65th overall–to Atlanta Falcons and Ken Sanders respectively) on January 28, 1971. He led the 1964 Long Beach Vikings football team to the junior college national championship, and also played college football for the Tulsa Golden Hurricane. He also played in the Canadian Football League (CFL) for two seasons as part of a quarterbacking tandem with starter Joe Theismann for the Toronto Argonauts and in the World Football League (WFL) for the Portland Storm.
