= Richard Carter (American football) =

American football and basketball coach (1919–2002)

Biographical details
- Born: February 21, 1919
- Died: April 22, 2002 (aged 83)

Playing career

Football
- 1935–1936: Graceland

Coaching career (HC unless noted)

Football
- 1946–1959: Graceland
- 1962: Central Missouri

Basketball
- 1947–1957: Graceland

Head coaching record
- Overall: 63–27–4 (junior college football); 10–19–2 (college football)

Accomplishments and honors

Championships
- Football; 7 Interstate Conference (1946–1948, 1950, 1952–1954)

Richard A. Carter (February 21, 1919 – April 22, 2002) was an American football and basketball coach. He served as the head football coach at Graceland College in Lamoni, Iowa, first as a junior college coach from 1946 to 1956 and then transitioning the program to a four-year, varsity unit beginning in 1957 until 1959. Carter spent one season as the head football coach at the University of Central Missouri in 1962.

== Head coaching record ==
=== College football ===
Year	Team	Overall	Conference	Standing	Bowl/playoffs
Graceland Yellowjackets (NAIA independent) (1957–1959)
1957	Graceland	3–4			
1958	Graceland	3–4			
1959	Graceland	2–5–1			
Graceland:		8–13–1			
Central Missouri State Mules (Missouri Intercollegiate Athletic Association) (1962)
1962	Central Missouri State	2–6–1	2–3	4th	
Central Missouri State:		2–6–1	2–3		
Total:		10–19–2			

=== Junior college football ===
Year	Team	Overall	Conference	Standing	Bowl/playoffs
Graceland Yellowjackets (Interstate Conference) (1946–1955)
1946	Graceland	5–1–1	4–0	1st	
1947	Graceland	7–1	4–0	1st	
1948	Graceland	6–1–1	3–0–1	1st	
1949	Graceland	5–4	2–2	3rd	
1950	Graceland	7–0	4–0	1st	
1951	Graceland	5–3–1	3–0–1	2nd	
1952	Graceland	5–4	4–0	1st	
1953	Graceland	6–3	4–0	1st	
1954	Graceland	7–1–1	4–0	1st	
1955	Graceland	5–5	4–1	T–2nd	
Graceland Yellowjackets () (1956)
1956	Graceland	5–4			
Graceland:		63–27–4			
Total:		63–27–4			
National championship Conference title Conference division title or championship game berth
