= 1964 Long Beach Vikings football team =

American college football season

1964 Long Beach Vikings football

Junior college national champion Metropolitan Conference champion Junior Rose Bowl champion

Junior Rose Bowl, W 28–6 vs. Cameron
- Conference: Metropolitan Conference
- Record: 10–0 (6–0 Metropolitan)
- Head coach: Jim Stangeland (8th season)
- Home stadium: Veterans Memorial Stadium

1964 Metropolitan Conference football standings
	Conf.					Overall
Team	W		L		T	W		L		T
Long Beach $	6	–	0	–	0	10	–	0	–	0
Bakersfield	5	–	1	–	0	8	–	2	–	0
El Camino	3	–	3	–	0	6	–	3	–	0
Cerritos	3	–	3	–	0	5	–	4	–	0
Los Angeles Valley	2	–	4	–	0	4	–	5	–	0
Santa Monica	2	–	4	–	0	4	–	5	–	0
East Los Angeles	0	–	6	–	0	1	–	8	–	0
$ – Conference champion

The 1964 Long Beach Vikings football team was an American football team that represented Long Beach City College as a member of the Metropolitan Conference during the 1964 junior college football season. In their eighth year under head coach Jim Stangeland, the Vikings compiled a perfect 10–0 record, won the Metropolitan Conference championship, defeated Cameron in the Junior Rose Bowl, and outscored all opponents by a total of 350 to 74. They were ranked No. 1 in the final junior college rankings and were recognized as the junior college national champion.

Key players included halfback "Marvelous Marv" Motley and quarterback Greg Barton. Wide receiver Earl McCullouch later played in the NFL and was the NFL Rookie of the Year in 1968.

The team played its home games at Veterans Memorial Stadium in Long Beach, California.

== Schedule ==
Date	Opponent	Site	Result	Attendance	Source
September 25	Santa Ana*	Veterans Memorial Stadium; Long Beach, CA	W 45–0	5,781	
October 3	at Fullerton*	Fullerton, CA	W 21–14		
October 10	at Bakersfield	Bakersfield, CA	W 27–6	18,131	
October 17	Santa Monica	Veterans Memorial Stadium; Long Beach, CA	W 47–22	6,481	
October 24	at Los Angeles Valley	Monarch Field; Van Nuys, CA	W 24–0	5,500	
October 30	East Los Angeles	East Los Angeles, CA	W 55–0	2,500	
November 7	Grossmont*	Veterans Memorial Stadium; Long Beach, CA	W 47–0	3,646	
November 14	El Camino	Veterans Memorial Stadium; Long Beach, CA	W 21–14	9,583	
November 21	at Cerritos	Norwalk, CA	W 35–12	11,690	
December 12	vs. Cameron*	Rose Bowl; Pasadena, CA (Junior Rose Bowl)	W 28–6	45,576	
*Non-conference game
