= John H. Little =

United States Army general

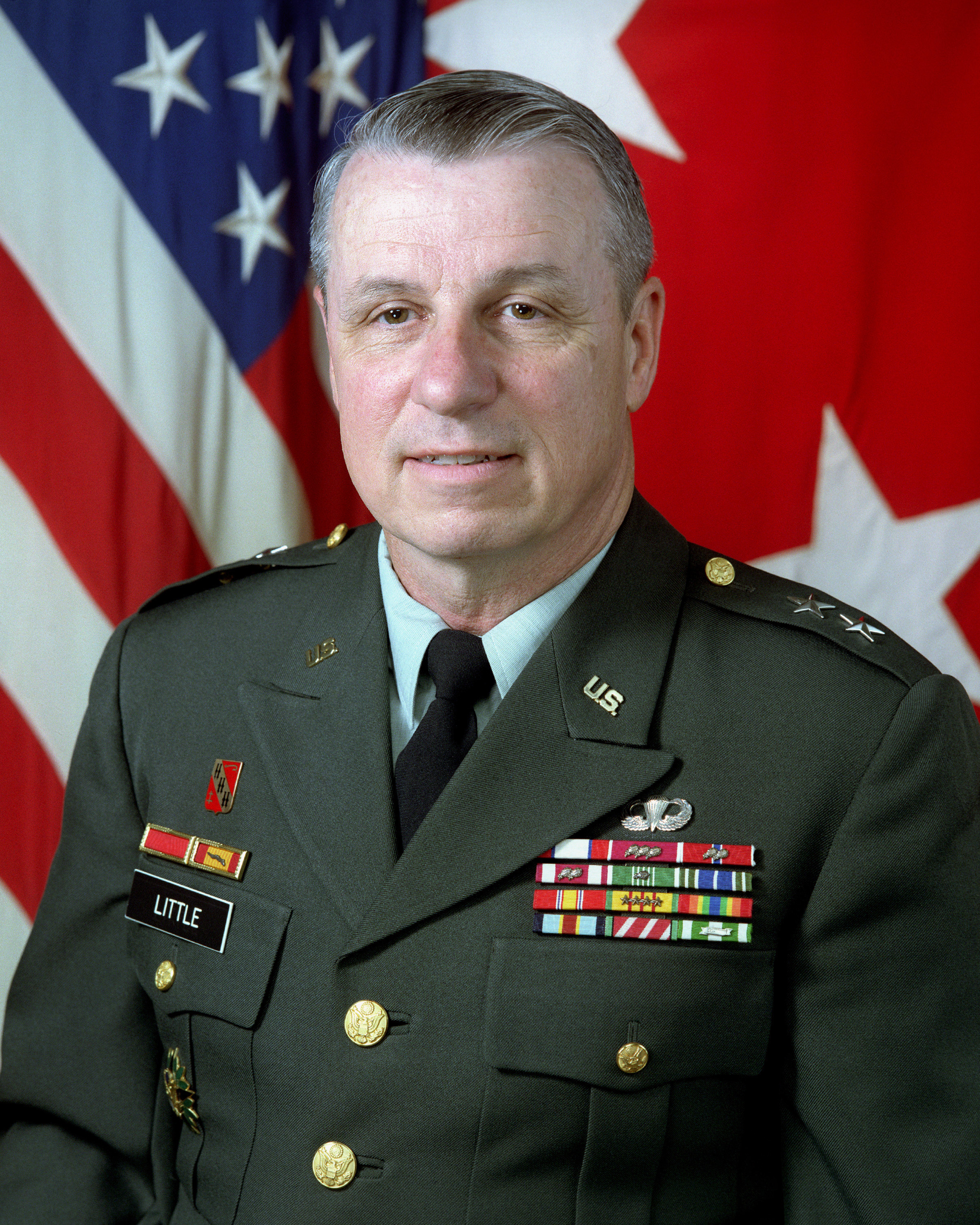
Maj. Gen. John H. Little in 1993

Major General John Hadley Little (born 16 October 1941) served as the 12th Superintendent of the Wentworth Military Academy in Lexington, Missouri from 2002 to 2007.

Born in Kansas and raised in the Lexington area, Little attended Wentworth from 1957 to 1961, graduating from both the high school and the junior college. He was designated as a Distinguished Military Graduate and was commissioned as a Second Lieutenant in the Regular Army at Wentworth in May 1963 following his graduation from University of Central Missouri.

During his military career spanning 32 years, Little served in a succession of executive level positions. He served two tours in Vietnam, had multiple assignments in the research and development field, had a battalion command with the 2d Armored Division, and a Brigade command at Fort Bliss in El Paso, Texas. After being promoted to Major General, he served as Commanding General of the U.S. Army Air and Missile Defense Center at Fort Bliss. That command included over 12,000 soldiers and 7,000 civilian employees. General Little's Army career culminated in his appointment as the Army's first Assistant Chief of Staff for Installation Management on the Army Staff at The Pentagon. In this position, he was responsible for the management and operation of the Army's over 400 forts, posts, camps and stations around the world. He also attended the Air War College, Army Command and General Staff College, and he earned an MBA in Operations Research/Systems Analysis from Tulane University. Among his awards and decorations are two Distinguished Service Medals, four awards of the Legion of Merit, three Bronze Star Medals and three Meritorious Service Medals.

Upon his retirement from the U.S. Army in 1995, he served as vice president and Program Manager with Lockheed Martin Corporation in Sunnyvale, California, where he managed the development of a three billion dollar theater missile defense system. Little was named as the twelfth superintendent of Wentworth Military Academy in 2002. He retired in May 2007.
