= Edwin Edgar Voigt =

American methodist bishop

Edwin Edgar Voigt (February 13, 1892 in Illinois – August 1977) was an American bishop of German descent in The Methodist Church, elected in 1952. He served as the bishop of the Dakotas Episcopal Area.

Prior to his election to the episcopacy, Voigt served as the fifteenth president of Simpson College (1942–52), a United Methodist college in Indianola, Iowa. Voigt led the college through two challenging post-war periods, when declining enrollment was a severe problem.

== Publications ==
- Biblical Hebrew for beginners, by Ovid R. Sellers & Edwin Edgar Voigt; Publisher: Chicago, Blessing Book Stores, inc., 1941.
- Methodist worship in the church universal, by Edwin Edgar Voigt; Publisher: Nashville, Graded Press 1965

== See also ==
- List of bishops of the United Methodist Church
