= Chickalah, Arkansas =

- Unincorporated community
- Location within Arkansas Location within the United States
- Coordinates: 35°09′51″N 93°16′43″W
- Country: United States
- State: Arkansas
- County: Yell
- Elevation: 407 ft (124 m)
- Time zone: UTC-6 (Central (CST))
  - Summer (DST): UTC-5 (CDT)
- Area code: 479
- GNIS feature ID: 71130

Chickalah is an unincorporated community in Yell County, Arkansas, United States, located on Arkansas Highway 27, 8 miles (13 km) west-southwest of Dardanelle.
