= Interstate Conference =

Junior college athletic conference in Iowa, Kansas, Missouri, and Nebraska

The Interstate Conference was a junior college athletic conference with member schools located in Iowa, Kansas, Missouri, and Nebraska. It was formed on March 14, 1938 at a meeting held in Chillicothe, Missouri, by officials from five charter members: Chillicothe Business College of Chillicothe, Missouri, Graceland College (now known as Graceland University) of Lamoni, Iowa, Kemper Military School of Boonville, Missouri, Moberly Junior College (now known as Moberly Area Community College) of Moberly, Missouri, and Wentworth Military Academy of Lexington, Missouri. In 1939, Kansas City Kansas Junior College—now known as Kansas City Kansas Community College—joined as the conference's sixth member. Moberly withdrew from the conference in the 1940s. Burlington Junior College—now known as Southeastern Community College—of Burlington, Iowa joined the Interstate Conference in 1951.

== Yearly football standings ==
1938 Interstate Conference football standings
	Conf.					Overall
Team	W		L		T	W		L		T
Kemper +	2	–	1	–	1	?	–	?	–	?
Moberly +	2	–	1	–	1	?	–	?	–	?
Graceland	2	–	2	–	0	?	–	?	–	?
Chillicothe	1	–	1	–	2	?	–	?	–	?
Wentworth	1	–	3	–	0	?	–	?	–	?
+ – Conference co-champions

1939 Interstate Conference football standings
	Conf.					Overall
Team	W		L		T	W		L		T
Kemper $	5	–	0	–	0	?	–	?	–	?
Graceland	4	–	1	–	0	?	–	?	–	?
Kansas City JC (KS)	3	–	2	–	0	?	–	?	–	?
Chillicothe	2	–	3	–	0	?	–	?	–	?
Wentworth	1	–	4	–	0	?	–	?	–	?
Moberly	0	–	5	–	0	?	–	?	–	?
$ – Conference champion

1940 Interstate Conference football standings
	Conf.					Overall
Team	W		L		T	W		L		T
Kemper $	4	–	0	–	1	8	–	0	–	1
Kansas City JC (KS)	3	–	0	–	2	4	–	1	–	3
Graceland	2	–	1	–	2	5	–	1	–	2
Wentworth	2	–	2	–	1	6	–	2	–	1
Moberly	1	–	4	–	0	1	–	6	–	0
Chillicothe	0	–	5	–	0	1	–	7	–	0
$ – Conference champion

1941 Interstate Conference football standings
	Conf.					Overall
Team	W		L		T	W		L		T
Graceland $	5	–	0	–	0	7	–	1	–	0
Kemper	4	–	1	–	0	6	–	2	–	1
Wentworth	3	–	2	–	0	5	–	4	–	0
Chillicothe	1	–	3	–	1	3	–	5	–	1
Moberly	1	–	4	–	0	1	–	7	–	0
Kansas City JC (KS)	0	–	4	–	1	0	–	7	–	1
$ – Conference champion

1942 Interstate Conference football standings
	Conf.					Overall
Team	W		L		T	W		L		T
Chillicothe +	3	–	1	–	0	?	–	?	–	?
Graceland +	3	–	1	–	0	?	–	?	–	?
Wentworth +	3	–	1	–	0	?	–	?	–	?
Kansas City JC (KS)	1	–	3	–	0	?	–	?	–	?
Kemper	0	–	4	–	0	?	–	?	–	?
+ – Conference co-champions

1946 Interstate Conference football standings
	Conf.					Overall
Team	W		L		T	W		L		T
Graceland $	4	–	0	–	0	5	–	1	–	1
Wentworth	2	–	1	–	1	6	–	3	–	1
Kansas City JC (KS)	2	–	1	–	1	3	–	3	–	1
Chillicothe	1	–	3	–	0	?	–	?	–	?
Kemper	0	–	4	–	0	1	–	5	–	0
$ – Conference champion

1947 Interstate Conference football standings
	Conf.					Overall
Team	W		L		T	W		L		T
Graceland $	4	–	0	–	0	7	–	1	–	0
Wentworth	3	–	1	–	0	?	–	?	–	?
Kansas City JC (KS)	2	–	2	–	0	3	–	4	–	0
Kemper	1	–	3	–	0	3	–	5	–	1
Chillicothe	0	–	4	–	0	?	–	?	–	?
$ – Conference champion

1948 Interstate Conference football standings
	Conf.					Overall
Team	W		L		T	W		L		T
Graceland $	3	–	0	–	1	6	–	1	–	1
Kemper	2	–	0	–	2	3	–	3	–	2
Chillicothe	2	–	1	–	1	?	–	?	–	?
Wentworth	1	–	3	–	0	?	–	?	–	?
Kansas City JC (KS)	0	–	4	–	0	0	–	7	–	0
$ – Conference champion

1949 Interstate Conference football standings
	Conf.					Overall
Team	W		L		T	W		L		T
Kansas City JC (KS) $	4	–	0	–	0	8	–	0	–	0
Chillicothe	3	–	1	–	0	?	–	?	–	?
Graceland	2	–	2	–	0	5	–	4	–	0
Wentworth	1	–	3	–	0	3	–	6	–	0
Kemper	0	–	4	–	0	1	–	8	–	0
$ – Conference champion

1950 Interstate Conference football standings
	Conf.					Overall
Team	W		L		T	W		L		T
Graceland $	4	–	0	–	0	7	–	0	–	0
Wentworth	2	–	1	–	1	?	–	?	–	?
Chillicothe	2	–	2	–	0	?	–	?	–	?
Kemper	1	–	3	–	0	?	–	?	–	?
Kansas City JC (KS)	0	–	3	–	1	?	–	?	–	?
$ – Conference champion

1951 Interstate Conference football standings
	Conf.					Overall
Team	W		L		T	W		L		T
Wentworth $	4	–	0	–	1	7	–	2	–	1
Graceland	3	–	0	–	1	5	–	3	–	1
Kansas City JC (KS)	2	–	1	–	0	?	–	?	–	?
Burlington	2	–	2	–	0	?	–	?	–	?
Chillicothe	1	–	4	–	0	?	–	?	–	?
Kemper	0	–	5	–	0	1	–	8	–	0
$ – Conference champion

1952 Interstate Conference football standings
	Conf.					Overall
Team	W		L		T	W		L		T
Graceland $	4	–	0	–	0	5	–	4	–	0
Burlington	2	–	1	–	0	?	–	?	–	?
Kemper	1	–	2	–	1	?	–	?	–	?
Kansas City JC (KS)	1	–	2	–	0	?	–	?	–	?
Wentworth	0	–	3	–	1	?	–	?	–	?
$ – Conference champion

1953 Interstate Conference football standings
	Conf.					Overall
Team	W		L		T	W		L		T
Graceland $	4	–	0	–	0	6	–	3	–	0
Burlington	2	–	1	–	0	?	–	?	–	?
Kansas City JC (KS)	1	–	2	–	0	?	–	?	–	?
Kemper	1	–	3	–	0	?	–	?	–	?
Wentworth	1	–	3	–	0	?	–	?	–	?
$ – Conference champion

1954 Interstate Conference football standings
	Conf.					Overall
Team	W		L		T	W		L		T
Graceland $	4	–	0	–	0	7	–	1	–	1
Fort Scott	1	–	0	–	1	?	–	?	–	?
Kemper	2	–	2	–	0	?	–	?	–	?
Burlington	1	–	2	–	0	?	–	?	–	?
Wentworth	1	–	3	–	1	?	–	?	–	?
Kansas City JC (KS)	1	–	3	–	0	?	–	?	–	?
$ – Conference champion

1955 Interstate Conference football standings
	Conf.					Overall
Team	W		L		T	W		L		T
Fort Scott $	5	–	1	–	0	?	–	?	–	?
Graceland	4	–	1	–	0	5	–	5	–	0
Joplin	4	–	1	–	0	?	–	?	–	?
Wentworth	3	–	3	–	0	?	–	?	–	?
Kansas City JC (KS)	2	–	4	–	0	?	–	?	–	?
Highland	1	–	4	–	0	?	–	?	–	?
Kemper	0	–	5	–	0	?	–	?	–	?
$ – Conference champion

1956 Interstate Conference football standings
	Conf.					Overall
Team	W		L		T	W		L		T
Highland $	5	–	0	–	0	?	–	?	–	?
Joplin	4	–	1	–	0	?	–	?	–	?
Fort Scott	3	–	2	–	0	?	–	?	–	?
Kansas City JC (KS)	2	–	3	–	0	?	–	?	–	?
Wentworth	1	–	4	–	0	?	–	?	–	?
Kemper	0	–	5	–	0	?	–	?	–	?
$ – Conference champion

1957 Interstate Conference football standings
	Conf.					Overall
Team	W		L		T	W		L		T
Joplin $	5	–	0	–	0	?	–	?	–	?
Fort Scott	4	–	1	–	0	5	–	4	–	0
Highland	2	–	2	–	0	?	–	?	–	?
Kemper	2	–	3	–	0	4	–	4	–	0
Wentworth	1	–	3	–	0	2	–	5	–	0
Kansas City JC (KS)	0	–	5	–	0	?	–	?	–	?
$ – Conference champion

1959 Interstate Conference football standings
	Conf.					Overall
Team	W		L		T	W		L		T
Joplin $	3	–	0	–	0	7	–	1	–	0
Highland	2	–	1	–	0	6	–	3	–	0
Wentworth	1	–	2	–	0	3	–	4	–	1
Fort Scott	0	–	3	–	0	?	–	?	–	?
$ – Conference champion

1962 Interstate Conference football standings
	Conf.					Overall
Team	W		L		T	W		L		T
Fort Scott $	4	–	0	–	0	9	–	1	–	0
Joplin	3	–	1	–	0	3	–	5	–	0
Highland	1	–	2	–	1	5	–	2	–	1
Fairbury	1	–	2	–	1	3	–	4	–	1
Wentworth	0	–	4	–	0	1	–	7	–	0
$ – Conference champion

1964 Interstate Conference football standings
	Conf.					Overall
Team	W		L		T	W		L		T
Joplin $	4	–	0	–	0	6	–	3	–	0
Fairbury	2	–	1	–	1	?	–	?	–	?
Highland	2	–	2	–	0	?	–	?	–	?
Haskell	1	–	2	–	1	2	–	4	–	2
Wentworth	0	–	4	–	0	?	–	?	–	?
$ – Conference champion

1965 Interstate Conference football standings
	Conf.					Overall
Team	W		L		T	W		L		T
Joplin $	5	–	0	–	0	10	–	0	–	0
Highland	4	–	1	–	0	7	–	1	–	0
Fairbury	3	–	2	–	0	5	–	4	–	0
Wentworth	2	–	3	–	0	3	–	5	–	0
Haskell	1	–	4	–	0	1	–	8	–	0
Kemper	0	–	5	–	0	1	–	7	–	0
$ – Conference champion
