= Chillicothe Business College =

Private college in Chillicothe, Missouri, U.S.

Chillicothe Business College (CBC) was a private college located in Chillicothe, Missouri that operated from 1890 to 1952. The college was founded in 1890 by Allen Moore as the Chillicothe Normal School and Business Institute.

Chillicothe's sports teams were known as the Ducks. The school's colors were purple and gold. CBC joined the Interstate Conference at its founding in 1938.

== Notable alumni ==
- Carl E. Bailey, attorney and the governor of Arkansas from 1937 to 1941
- Lester Dent, pulp-fiction writer
- Huger Lee Foote, planter Mississippi state senator
- Elmo M. Haney, master gunnery sergeant in the United States Marine Corps
- William J. Hopkins, White House executive clerk from 1948 to 1971
- Cal Hubbard, professional football player and Major League Baseball umpire
