= James M. Sellers =

American academic administrator and soldier (1895–1990)

James McBrayer Sellers
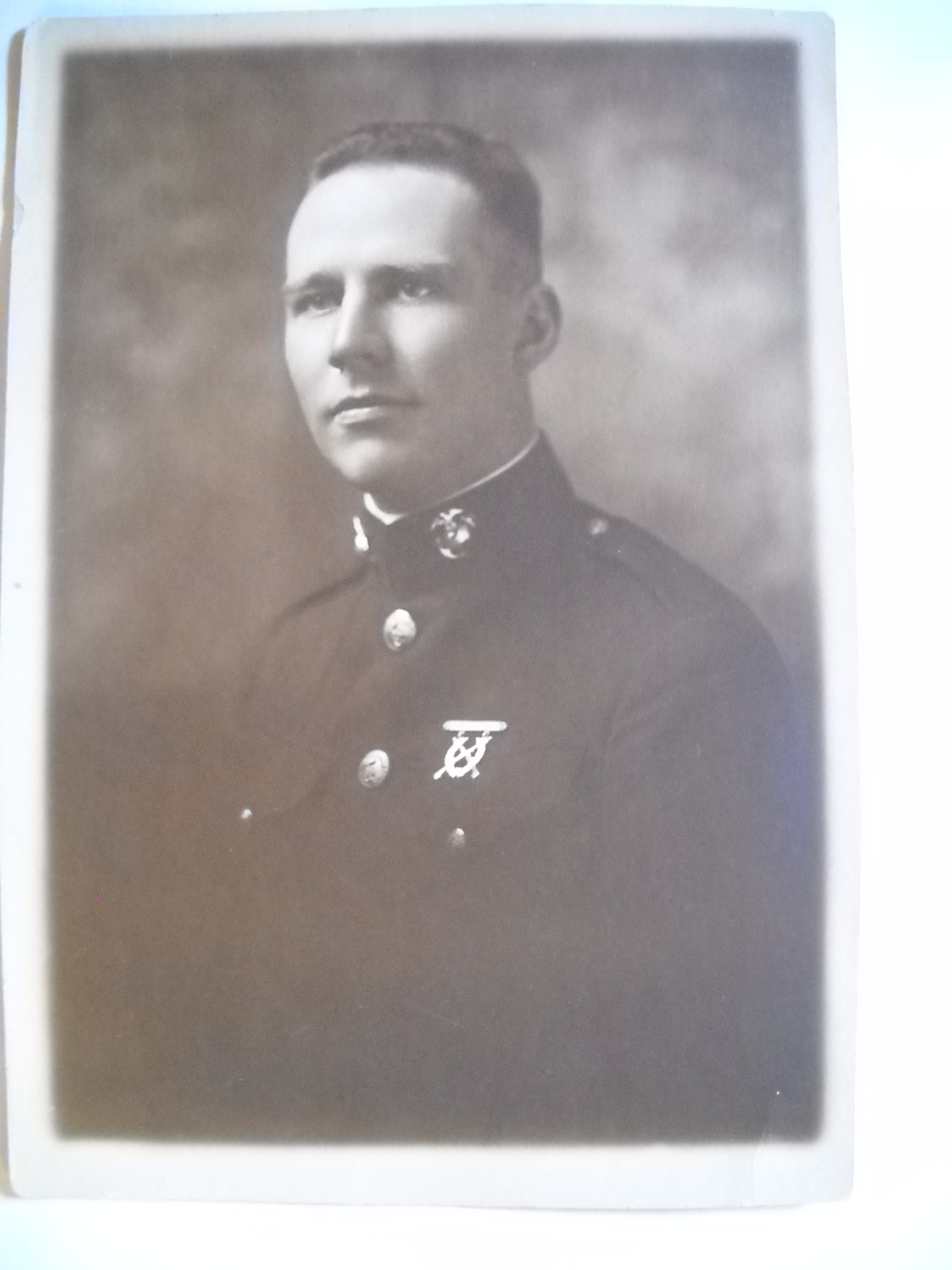
- Lt. James M. Sellers, 1917
- Born: June 20, 1895; Lexington, Missouri
- Died: September 3, 1990 (aged 95); Lexington, Missouri
- Burial place: Machpelah Cemetery
- Military career
- Allegiance: United States of America
- Branch: United States Marine Corps
- Service years: 1917–1944
- Rank: Lieutenant colonel
- Units: 6th Marine Regiment, 2nd Battalion, 78th Company
- Conflicts: World War I Battle of Chateau-Thierry; Battle of Belleau Wood; Battle of Blanc Mont Ridge; Meuse-Argonne Offensive
- Awards: Marine Corps; Croix de Guerre; Distinguished Service Cross; Silver Star (2); Navy Cross; Purple Heart
- Other work: Superintendent and President of Wentworth Military Academy

Colonel James McBrayer Sellers (June 20, 1895 – September 3, 1990) was a highly decorated Marine in World War I, and served as commandant, superintendent and president of Wentworth Military Academy in Lexington, Missouri, from 1920 to 1990.

== Biography ==
=== Early life ===
James McBrayer Sellers was born in Wentworth Military Academy's administration building in 1895. His father, Sandford Sellers, served as superintendent and president of the school from 1880 to 1935. He graduated from the academy in 1912, and moved on to the University of Chicago, where he was a member of Beta Theta Pi and earned Phi Beta Kappa honors. He also was a reserve on Amos Alonzo Stagg's football squad, and in 1917 was named as one of twelve marshalls for his senior class.

=== World War I ===
In April 1917, shortly after the United States entered World War I, Sellers joined the United States Marine Corps and was commissioned as a second lieutenant in the 78th Company, 2nd Battalion 6th Marines. He participated in the Battle of Chateau-Thierry, Battle of Belleau Wood, Battle of Blanc Mont Ridge, and the Meuse-Argonne Offensive. He was shot through the groin at Belleau Wood on June 6, 1918. He recuperated for three months, then rejoined his troops. When he returned, he was given command of the 78th Company in time for the Battle at Blanc Mont. The 78th engaged in heavy fighting at Blanc Mont, and Sellers wrote up the Citations for two men of his men, John J. Kelly and John H. Pruitt, that resulted in their being awarded the Medal of Honor. Kelly and Pruitt were his company runners, and Kelly was also his orderly. They were two of only seven Marines to earn the Medal of Honor during the war. For bravery in action, Sellers was awarded the Distinguished Service Cross, the Silver Star (2 citations), the Navy Cross, the Purple Heart, and the French Croix de Guerre. Discharged from active service in 1920, he remained in the Marines as a reserve officer until his retirement in 1944 with the rank of lieutenant colonel.

=== Wentworth Military Academy ===
He returned to Wentworth Military Academy in 1920 and married Academy founder Stephen G. Wentworth’s great-granddaughter, Rebekah Evans Sellers in 1925. He served first as Commandant, then as Superintendent from 1933 to 1960 and President from 1935 to 1990. When the Great Depression of the 1930s hit the country, Wentworth, like many institutions across the country, struggled to survive. Sellers guided the school through the lean years of the 1930s and into a period of prosperity in the 1940s, 1950s and 1960s. Under his leadership, Wentworth added a number of buildings to the campus, including the Sellers-Wikoff Scholastic Building, the Memorial Chapel, Sandford Sellers Hall, and the Wikoff Field House. In addition, a unique military aviator training program complete with its own airport was launched during World War II to train pilots. A highlight of Sellers' presidency was President Harry S. Truman's speech to the cadet corps at Wentworth's 75th Anniversary celebration in 1954. In 1960, Sellers retired as Superintendent but remained as President of the school. His son, James M. Sellers, Jr., served as Wentworth's Superintendent from 1973 to 1990, and one of his grandsons, William W. Sellers served as President of Wentworth from 2008 to 2013. Sellers also taught Latin at the school for 70 years, and he gave his last lesson, in his office located directly under the room in which he was born, at the age of 95 in 1990.

In 1951–52, he served as Grand Commander of the Grand Commandery Knights Templar of Missouri, and in 1953–54 was elected Grand Master of the Missouri Grand Lodge of Freemasonry, the highest state Masonic offices.

=== Death ===
Sellers died September 3, 1990, in Lexington, Missouri, after a brief illness. He was buried with full military honors at Machpelah Cemetery in Lexington.

=== Awards and decorations ===
Sellers was the recipient of the following awards:

1st Row	Distinguished Service Cross	Navy Cross	Silver Star w/ gold star
2nd Row	Purple Heart	World War I Victory Medal w/ 4 battle stars	French Croix de guerre 1914–1918 with Gilt Star
French Fourragère
