= William C. Schwartz =

William C. Schwartz (March 25, 1927 – July 23, 2000) was a civic leader in Central Florida and a pioneer in the laser industry. He was founder, president and chairman of International Laser Systems, Inc., and later, Schwartz Electro-Optics, Inc., both based in Orlando, Florida.

Schwartz was born in Lexington, Missouri. He attended Wentworth Military Academy in Lexington, then went on to earn a BS in mathematics at The University of Chicago and an MA in mathematics from the University of Missouri. He also was awarded an honorary doctorate in engineering science by the University of Central Florida.

After a brief teaching career, Schwartz went to work for North American Aviation (NAA) (later to become Rockwell and now Boeing), one of the military aircraft manufacturers, as a systems analyst and performed ballistics analysis and developed gunsight and fire control systems equations. He was charged with evaluating the performance of aircraft fire and bombing systems, including war gaming and operations research. In the late 1950s, he developed an interest in space vehicles and orbital calculations. He was a member of the founding group within NAA involved with the development of space vehicles and which developed the Apollo program. In the early 1960s, he moved to The Martin Company (later Martin Marietta and now Lockheed Martin), where he managed three departments, Operations Research, Systems Engineering and Human Factors for the missile developer. It was during this period that he became involved in laser research and development. Shortly after the invention of the laser in 1960, Martin recognized its potential in missile guidance. Schwartz went on to head the laser missile guidance research and development at Martin during most of the 1960s. He helped develop some of the first lasers for the United States Army used in the Vietnam War.

In 1968, Schwartz left Martin and founded a company, International Laser Systems (ILS), based in Orlando, Florida. ILS developed and produced most of the laser target designators and rangefinders, used for laser-guided smart weapons in Desert Storm, the first war in Iraq. In 1983, ILS was sold to Martin Marietta and then to Litton Industries. After a brief retirement, Schwartz founded Schwartz Electro-Optics (SEO) in Orlando in 1984. SEO was also a laser company, but this time one involved in both commercial and military markets. By the year 2000, the company grew to about 150 employees and produced laser systems for traffic control, weapons training, aerospace, medical, and industrial applications.

Schwartz died in 2000. Following Schwartz's death, SEO won a role as a subcontractor in May 2001 on a Lockheed Martin project that was supposed to bring in $70 million to SEO over five years. The project focused on a high-end laser tag system for Army Infantry training. Following the September 11, 2001 terrorist attacks on the World Trade Center, the American military deprioritized their training programs as they prepared for military action in Afghanistan and Iraq. SEO had already ramped up for production, and as the Lockheed Martin contract slipped, SEO was forced to file for bankruptcy in May 2003. In November 2003, the remaining assets of the company were liquidated at auction.

To honor Schwartz's many contributions to Orlando's growth, the Metro Orlando Economic Development Commission announced the establishment of the William C. Schwartz Industry Innovation Awards that are awarded annually to Orlando area companies based on their creative innovation in areas including business processes, technology development, strategic partnerships and products or services.
