= Sandford Sellers =

Sandford Sellers (1854–1938) was the Principal, Superintendent and President of Wentworth Military Academy from 1880 to 1935.

Sandford Sellers was born on July 24, 1854, near Lawrenceburg, Kentucky in Anderson County. He was the son of Dr. John Newton Sellers and Marcia Jane (McBrayer) Sellers, who moved the family to Texas shortly after his birth. He was raised on a ranch near Galveston. As a young boy, he worked in cotton and sugar cane fields, and as a teenager, worked the ranch as a cowboy.

In 1872, he returned to Kentucky and took coursework at Danville Collegiate Institute at Danville, Kentucky, before enrolling at Central University in Richmond, Kentucky. He received the degree of Bachelor of Arts in 1877 and the degree of Master of Arts in 1879. Between 1877 and 1880, he taught and served as principal of the academy at McAfee, Kentucky, taught at the military school at Waco, Texas, and then served as a Professor of English at Austin College at Sherman, Texas.

In 1880, he was convinced by his Central University classmate Benjamin L. Hobson to go to Lexington, Missouri to help start Wentworth Male Academy. When Hobson left to pursue a career in the ministry at the end of the 1880–81 school year, Sellers took sole charge of the academy. For the next 58 years, Sellers served as Principal, Superintendent and President of the school, which changed its name to Wentworth Military Academy in 1890. In 1893, Wentworth was made a post of the Missouri National Guard. The National Guard conferred the rank of Major upon Sellers in 1893 and that of Colonel in 1899. He oversaw the construction of numerous buildings on campus, as well as the addition of the Junior College in 1923.

For a number of years Colonel Sellers served as a director and vice-president of the Lexington Savings Bank. Politically, he was a Democrat, but he never sought public office. He joined the Presbyterian Church in 1875, and in 1898 he was elected ruling elder of this denomination for Lexington. He was made a Mason in 1897, belonging both to the chapter and the commandery.

He died on March 4, 1938, a few weeks after suffering a fall in the school gymnasium.

Wentworth later was headed by four of his descendants: son Sandford Sellers, Jr. (1923–1933), son James M. Sellers (1933–1960), grandson James M. Sellers, Jr. (1973–1990) and great-grandson William W. Sellers (2008–2013).
