= Association of Military Colleges and Schools of the United States =

Coordinates: 38.84906°N 77.25499°W

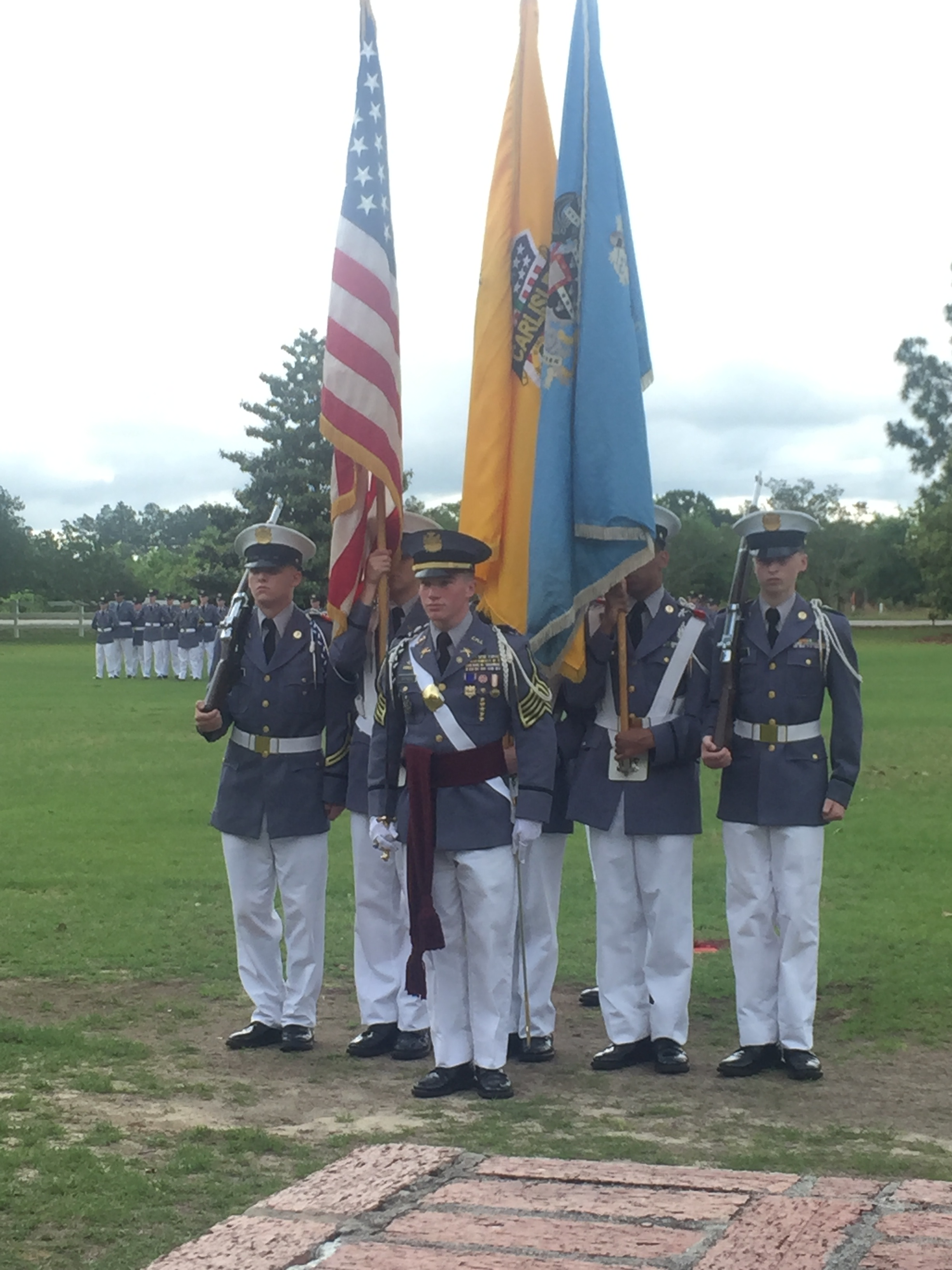
Cadets perform in a parade at Camden Military Academy (Camden, South Carolina)

The Association of Military Colleges and Schools of the United States (AMCSUS) is a nonprofit service organization of schools with military programs approved by the Department of Defense and which maintain good standing in their regional accrediting organizations. The purpose, as put forth in the AMCSUS Constitution, is "to promote the common interest of all members and to advance their welfare; promote and maintain high scholastic, military and ethical standards in member schools; represent the mutual interests of the member schools before the Department of Defense as well as the general public; foster and extend patriotism and respect for duly constituted authority; and cultivate citizens who love peace and who strive to maintain it."

Member military schools have armed services personnel detailed to the campus with the approval of the Department of Defense. The schools organize their student bodies as a cadet corps, with students habitually in uniform and continually under military discipline while at the college or school. The AMCSUS Headquarters are in Fairfax, Virginia.

== Member institutions ==
Member institutions of the Association of Military Colleges and Schools of the United States are listed below:

=== Senior Military College ===
- Norwich University (Northfield, Vermont; four-year private university)
- Virginia Military Institute (Lexington, Virginia; four-year public college)
- The Citadel, The Military College of South Carolina (Charleston, South Carolina; four-year public college)
- Virginia Tech (Blacksburg, Virginia; four-year public college)
- Texas A&M University (College Station, Texas; four-year public university)
- University of North Georgia (Dahlonega, Georgia; four-year public university)

=== Military Junior Colleges ===
- Georgia Military College (Milledgeville, Georgia; two-year junior college and four-year high school)
- Marion Military Institute (Marion, Alabama; two-year junior college)
- New Mexico Military Institute (Roswell, New Mexico; two-year junior college and four-year high school)
- Valley Forge Military College (Wayne, Pennsylvania; two-year transfer college)

=== Military High Schools ===
- Admiral Farragut Academy (St. Petersburg, Florida; coeducational)
- Army and Navy Academy (Carlsbad, California)
- Benedictine High School (Richmond, Virginia)
- Camden Military Academy (Camden, South Carolina)
- Colorado Military Academy (Colorado Springs, Colorado)
- Culver Military Academy (Culver, Indiana)
- Fishburne Military School (Waynesboro, Virginia)
- Fork Union Military Academy (Fork Union, Virginia)
- Hargrave Military Academy (Chatham, Virginia)
- Lyman Ward Military Academy (Camp Hill, Alabama)
- Marine Military Academy (Harlingen, Texas)
- Massanutten Military Academy (Woodstock, Virginia; coeducational)
- Missouri Military Academy (Mexico, Missouri)
- Oak Ridge Military Academy (Oak Ridge, North Carolina; coeducational)
- Randolph-Macon Academy (Front Royal, Virginia; coeducational)
- Riverside Military Academy (Gainesville, Georgia)
- Southern Preparatory Academy (Camp Hill, Alabama)
- Saint Thomas Academy (Mendota Heights, Minnesota)
- St. John's Northwestern Military Academy (Delafield, Wisconsin)
- Utah Military Academy (Riverdale, Utah & Lehi, Utah)
- Valley Forge Military Academy - closing May 2026

== See also ==
- List of United States military schools and academies
- List of defunct United States military academies
