= Wentworth Military Academy and College =

School in Lexington, Missouri, United States (1880–2017)

Wentworth Military Academy & College

Location
- 1880 Washington Avenue; Lexington, Missouri; United States

Information
- Type: Private military high school & junior college
- Motto: En Dieu Est Tout (French), In God Is All (English)
- Established: 1880
- Founder: Stephen G. Wentworth
- Status: Closed
- Closed: 2017
- Grades: 6-12 (Academy), Freshman & Sophomore (College)
- Gender: Boys (1880–1993), co-ed (1993–2017)
- Campus: Rural
- Colors: Red & white
- Mascot: Dragon
- Nickname: Red Dragons
- Rival: Kemper Military School
- Yearbook: Pass-In-Review

Wentworth Military Academy and College was a private two-year military college and high school in Lexington, Missouri, one of six military junior colleges in the United States. The institution was founded in 1880 and closed in 2017.

== History ==
=== Background ===
Lexington's Civil War Battle of the Hemp Bales was still a recent memory when Stephen G. Wentworth founded Wentworth Military Academy in 1880. By the 1870s, the town had already attained the reputation as the "Athens of the West" for its many academic institutions. Lexington was home to three notable schools for girls. Lexington Baptist Female College was started in 1850 in the old county courthouse that had been abandoned upon the construction of the new Lafayette County Courthouse, built in 1847 and still in use today. In 1869 the Baptist Female College moved its operation to the former home of Pony Express Founder William B. Waddell at the corner of 13th and South Streets. Elizabeth Aull Seminary was opened in the fall of 1860 and operated in a large building on Highland Avenue. Central Female College, later Central College for Women, began in 1868 and, in 1871, took over the old Masonic College on the grounds of the Battlefield. However, Lexington's educators, business leaders and ministers had made numerous attempts to establish a school for boys and young men. Public schools were not yet widespread and there was a glaring need for a boys' school, but none had been successful. The most visible failed effort was the Masonic College of Missouri, which moved to Lexington in 1847 and operated until 1859.

- Wentworth Military Academy
- U.S. National Register of Historic Places
- U.S. Historic district
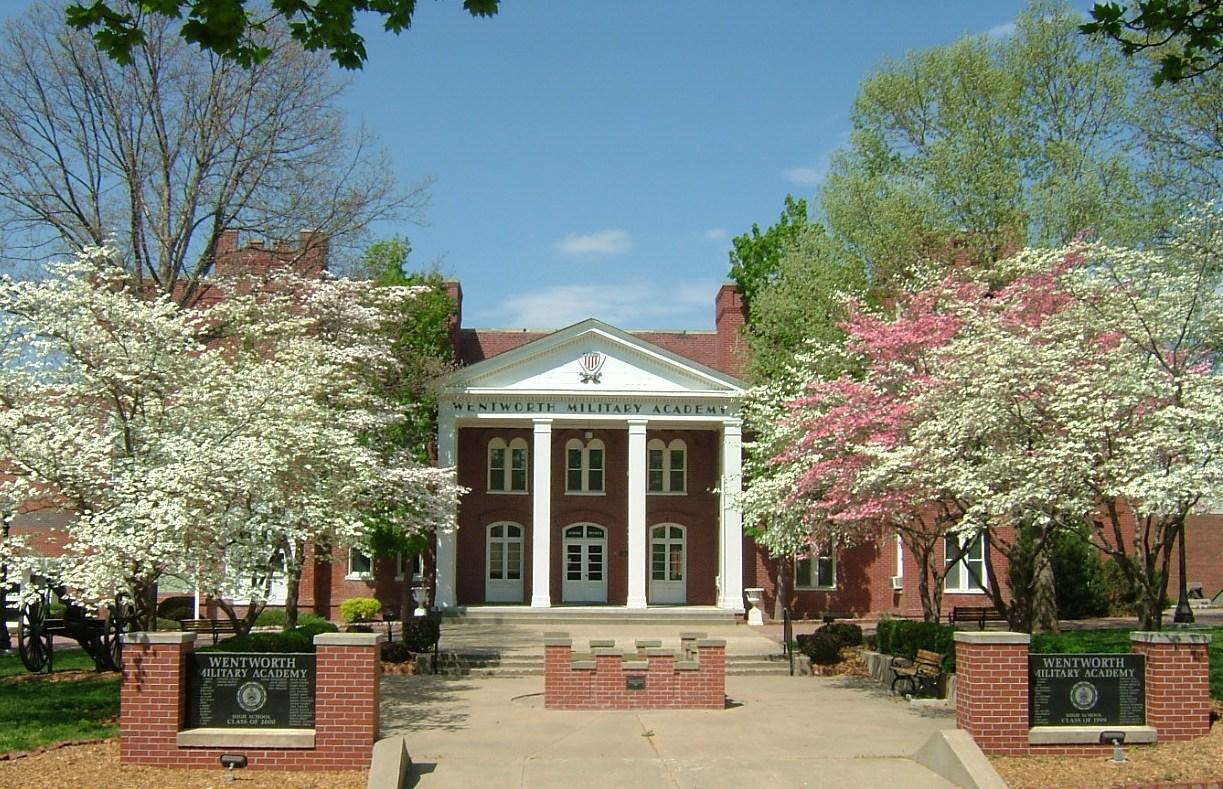
- Wentworth Military Academy Administration Building

- Location within Missouri Location within the United States
- Location: Washington Ave. and 18th St., Lexington, Missouri
- Area: 15.2 acres (6.2 ha)
- Built: 1883
- Architect: Multiple
- Architectural style: Greek Revival, Italianate
- NRHP reference No.: 80002373
- Added to NRHP: November 24, 1980

=== Wentworth Male Academy ===
On May 12, 1879, Wentworth's 27-year-old son William died. As a memorial, Wentworth focused his attention on finally making a school for boys a reality in Lexington. In the spring of 1880, Mr. Wentworth announced that a new school named Wentworth Male Academy would begin operation in the fall. Mr. Wentworth had a long record of public service to Lexington. A local editorial writer proclaimed that Wentworth was "One of our oldest, most generous and most worthy citizens" and "no nobler name can this community furnish [the new school]. " On May 24, 1880, Mr. Wentworth bought the "New Presbyterian Church" at the southwest corner of 18th and Main Streets, directed that it be fitted up for the next term, and gave the school solid financial backing. Although his financial involvement was limited to the Academy's early years of operation, his foresight led to the establishment of the first board of trustees and his generosity provided a firm foundation for the school.

Wentworth also announced that 22-year-old Benjamin Lewis Hobson, the son of the local Presbyterian minister who had run a fledgling private boys’ school in town the previous year, would be given charge of W.M.A. Young Hobson had graduated from Centre College in Danville, Kentucky, with a degree of Bachelor of Arts in 1877, and had spent the next two years as teacher and then principal of Spencer Institute in Taylorsville, Kentucky. In the summer of 1879, he had returned to his hometown of Lexington and started Hobson's Select School for Boys.

Benjamin Hobson knew that he could not operate the new school alone, and he turned to Sandford Sellers, a 26-year-old friend and former classmate at Centre College in Kentucky. Sellers eagerly accepted Hobson's invitation to join him as co-principal at Wentworth Male Academy. When Hobson left to pursue a career in the ministry at the end of the 1880–81 school year, Sellers took full charge of the academy.

=== Wentworth Military Academy ===
Sandford Sellers became the force who forged Wentworth's national reputation, and his hand would guide the school for the next 58 years. In the early days, he handled all the institution's administrative affairs, academic planning, and student recruitment on his own, canvassing surrounding areas on horseback. In 1882, Wentworth became a military school, and Sellers hired Captain David W. Fleet, a graduate of Virginia Military Institute, as the first Commandant. Fleet brought VMI terms such as "rats", "rears", and "Old Boys" to the school. The school officially changed its name to Wentworth Military Academy in 1890.

Sellers' skills as educator, administrator, businessman, and promoter saw the institution through its first half-century of growth, and his vision remained throughout the history of the school. He led Wentworth through economic panics of the 1890s, when he struggled to keep enrollment above 100, and through the boom times of World War I, when enrollment more than doubled to over 500 cadets. He also oversaw the addition of the junior college in 1923.

During much of the 20th century, the annual football game with rival Kemper Military School and College in Boonville, Missouri was a huge event on Thanksgiving Day, with both corps of cadets boarding trains and either meeting on their home fields, or sometimes meeting on a neutral field in Sedalia or Marshall, Missouri. The Kansas City and St. Louis newspapers referred to the gridiron battle as the "Little Army-Navy Game", and gave front-page coverage to the outcome. This rivalry ended with the 2002 closure of Kemper.

By the mid-1920s, Sandford Sellers, handed over much of the day-to-day operations of the school to his sons, Sandford Sellers Jr., superintendent from 1923 to 1933, and James M. Sellers, Commandant and Assistant Superintendent. But Sandford Sellers stayed very involved until his death in 1938 after a fall in the school gymnasium.

=== From the Great Depression to post-World War II prosperity ===
When the Great Depression of the 1930s hit the country, Wentworth, like many institutions across the country, struggled to survive. In 1933, Colonel James M. Sellers assumed the superintendency of the school and was soon joined at the helm by Colonel Lester B. Wikoff, treasurer and business manager. Together, Sellers’ natural leadership and Wikoff's business acumen would lead the school to new heights. Colonel Sellers and Colonel Wikoff guided the school through the lean years of the 1930s and into the prosperity of the 1940s, 1950s and 1960s. During their term of leadership, Wentworth added a number of buildings to the campus, including the Sellers-Wikoff Scholastic Building, the Memorial Chapel, Sandford Sellers Hall, and the Wikoff Field House. In addition, a unique military aviator training program complete with its own airport was launched to train pilots. A highlight of the Sellers-Wikoff era was President Harry S. Truman's speech to the cadet corps at Wentworth's 75th anniversary celebration in 1954. The cadet corps stood in review for the President before he attended a reception at the home of COL Sellers for the unveiling of a Mariners' Compass created in terrazzo tile by the Academy art instructor, Max Harper.

In 1960, Sellers retired as superintendent but remained as president of the school, and Wikoff served as superintendent from 1960 to 1971. During that time, Wentworth had unparalleled enrollment, averaging over 550 students a year. Under Wikoff's leadership, the 65,000-square-foot (6,000 m^{2}) Wikoff Field House opened in 1966, including three basketball courts, a Laykold-type indoor track, a racquetball court, a weight room, a wrestling room, and a pool. Among the signature programs that Wentworth offered from 1966 until its closing was the Army's two-year Early Commissioning Program, an Army Reserve Officers Training Corps (ROTC) program through which qualified students can earn a commission as a Second Lieutenant after two years of college. Wentworth also participated in the Air Force Academy Falcon Foundation Scholarship program beginning in 1971 and continuing through 2016. Among the first class of Falcon Scholars at Wentworth was General Mark A. Welsh who would go on to be 20th Chief of Staff of the U.S. Air Force.

=== Continuity and change in the post-Vietnam era ===
In 1973, a third generation of the Sellers family assumed leadership of the Academy when Colonel James M. Sellers Jr., a 1945 Wentworth graduate, was named as superintendent. In the early 1970s, the school was again faced with crisis. Anti-military backlash from the country's continued involvement in the Vietnam War, combined with double-digit inflation, caused enrollment to plummet. Many military schools across the country simply closed their doors. Wentworth was dealt an additional blow when, in 1975, a fire destroyed two buildings and severely damaged others, causing the loss of over 32,000 square feet (3,000 m^{2}) of space.

Despite these setbacks, Colonel J. M. Sellers Jr., was able to stabilize enrollment by 1978 and lead the academy through another period of growth. In 1980, Wentworth celebrated its centennial year, with Vice President Walter Mondale addressing the corps of cadets at commencement. In the early 1980s, enrollment continued to rise, peaking at over 400 cadets in 1984. In 1990, Colonel Sellers Sr., who taught Latin until he was 95 years old, died, and Colonel Sellers Jr., resigned as superintendent, ending a remarkable 110 years of the Sellers family's continuous involvement in the active operation of the academy.

=== Last years ===
In the 1990s, Wentworth struggled with enrollment. As part of a new approach, female cadets were admitted for the first time in 1993, and soon made up about twenty-five percent of the corps. The Wentworth Foundation was created in an attempt to build stronger financial footing. In 2002, Major General John H. Little, Wentworth Class of 1961, returned to campus as superintendent. Under his stewardship, Tillotson barracks was constructed.

=== Closure and auction of assets ===
On April 7, 2017, the Board of Trustees announced that Wentworth Military Academy & College would be closed, with final commencement to occur on May 13, 2017, and the official date of closure set for May 31, 2017. An email was sent out to all alumni and employees, parents and cadets informing them of the closure. The announcement cited declining enrollment, an aging campus, and a lack of financial support for continued operations. Plans were announced to settle the school's debts, allow students and staff to seek enrollment and employment elsewhere. The 43-acre campus and buildings were sold to Jubilee University (a Christian-based music boarding school) which has since maintained the facilities for their ongoing instructional operations. Also sold were the monuments honoring 130 years of valor and achievement, which were sold to the highest bidder by Oldham Auctions of Bates City MO. Many unique pieces of Wentworth's history were purchased at the auction by former cadet alumni, many of whom then donated it to the Wentworth Museum in downtown Lexington (WMAmuseum.org). Saved from the auction block for museum display were several large historic items, including the chapel's stained glass windows, and the actual WWI "Doughboy" statue which stood in front of the campus since 1921 and was traditionally saluted by every cadet when they passed by it.

== Academic accreditation ==
Wentworth's college was accredited by the Higher Learning Commission. The Higher Learning Commission placed Wentworth on probation in late 2015 "because of concerns related to integrity regarding the College's finances and resources to support its academic programs and operations." The high school was accredited by AdvancED, formerly the (North Central Association of Colleges and Schools).

== Current status of the school and grounds ==
Following its closure in May 2017, the campus was put up for sale and purchased in June 2020 by Jubilee University, a Christian music and performing arts organization based in St. Louis. The buildings remain vacant since the academy's closure and have fallen into disrepair.

=== National Historic District ===
The Wentworth Military Academy was listed as a national historic district on the National Register of Historic Places in 1980. The district encompasses seven contributing buildings erected from approximately 1830 to 1920. They are Hickman Hall (1907); "D" Company (1884); The Administration Building (1865, 1895, 1905 and 1938); The Student Union (1914, 1920 and 1966); Marine Barracks (1918 and 1928); Superintendent's Residence (1838 and 1848); and Junior Barracks (1920).

== Notable alumni ==
=== Politics ===
- Ike Skelton (Class of 1951)– United States Congressman, 4th District of Missouri (1977–2011), Ranking Democrat and Chairman of the House Armed Services Committee (2007–2011).
- Charles H. Price II – former United States Ambassador to Belgium (1981–1983) and United States Ambassador to the United Kingdom (1983–1989); appointed by President Ronald Reagan
- Newell A. George – United States Congressman, 1959–1961

=== Arts ===
- Robert Altman – Academy Award winning Director of classic films such as M*A*S*H (1970), McCabe & Mrs. Miller (1971), The Long Goodbye (1974), Nashville (1975), The Player (1992), Short Cuts (1993), Kansas City (1996), Dr. T & the Women (2000), Gosford Park (2001), The Company (2003), and A Prairie Home Companion (2006)
- Lew Hunter - American screenwriter, author and educator
- Marlin Perkins – world renowned zoologist and host of the television program Mutual of Omaha's Wild Kingdom
- Arthur Schneider – four-time Emmy Award winning television editor

=== Business ===
- James "Bud" Walton – Co-founder of Wal-Mart
- Eddie Chiles – Founder of the Western Company of North America and owner of the Texas Rangers baseball team
- William C. Schwartz – Physicist, Laser pioneer, and founder of International Laser Systems

=== Journalism ===
- Paul Henderson – reporter for The Seattle Times, winner of the Pulitzer Prize for Investigative Reporting in 1982
- Lewis Hill – co-founder of Pacifica Radio, the first public radio station in the U.S.
- Bill Corum – (Class of 1913)- sports columnist for the New York Journal-American, boxing, baseball and horse racing sportscaster, and president of Churchill Downs. Coined the term "Run for the Roses" to describe the Kentucky Derby.

=== Academia ===
- Ovid R. Sellers – internationally known Old Testament scholar and archaeologist

=== Athletics ===
- Beals Becker – Major League baseball player for the Pittsburgh Pirates, the Boston Doves, the New York Giants, the Cincinnati Reds, and the Philadelphia Phillies.
- Med Park – NBA player for the St. Louis Hawks.
- Harry Ice – MVP of 1942 Sugar Bowl, member of University of Missouri's all-century football team.
- Ben A. Jones – Thoroughbred horse trainer, six-time winner of the Kentucky Derby.
- George E. Rody – Captain of the first national championship basketball team at the University of Kansas,1922. Head basketball and baseball coach at Oklahoma State University, 1929–31. Head basketball coach at Tulane University, 1931–33.
- Ahmed bin Salman – Owner of 2002 Kentucky Derby winner War Emblem. Saudi royal and former owner of Saudi Research and Marketing Group.

=== Military ===
- William E. Adams (Class of 1959) – Medal of Honor recipient, Vietnam War
- William W. Ashurst – Recipient of the Silver Star and Legion of Merit
- Dale R. Buis – one of the first casualties of the Vietnam War
- Melvin F. Chubb Jr. (Class of 1951) – former Commander of Hanscom Air Force Base
- Harvey C. Clark (Class of 1889) – U.S. Army brigadier general
- William M. Hoge (Class of 1912) – oversaw construction of the ALCAN Highway and directed capture of the Remagen Bridge in World War II
- LeRoy Lutes – Commanding General, Fourth United States Army, 1949–1952
- Johnny R. Miller (Class of 1984) – Assistant Adjutant General of the Illinois Army National Guard
- Clarence L. Tinker (Class of 1908) – namesake of Tinker Air Force Base
- George B. Turner – Medal of Honor recipient, World War II
- Mark A. Welsh (Class of 1972) – 20th Chief of Staff of the U.S. Air Force, 2012–2016

== Presidents of Wentworth Military Academy & College ==
- Colonel Sandford Sellers, 1880–1906, 1907–1923.
- Colonel William McGuffey Hoge, 1906–1907.
- Colonel Sandford Sellers Jr., 1923–1933
- Colonel James M. Sellers, 1933–1960.
- Colonel Lester B. Wikoff, 1960–1971.
- Colonel Leon Ungles, 1971–1973.
- Colonel James M. Sellers Jr., 1973–1990.
- Colonel John Ryland Edwards, 1990.
- Lieutenant General Robert Arter, 1991.
- Colonel John Ryland Edwards, 1991.
- Brigadier General Gerald Childress, 1991–1994.
- Colonel Jerry E. Brown, 1994–2002.
- Major General John H. Little, 2002–2007.
- Captain (USN Retired) Basil Read, 2007–2008.
- William W. Sellers, 2008–2013
- Michael W. Lierman, 2013–2017

== See also ==
- Lexington Historical Museum
