= Stephen G. Wentworth =

Stephen G. Wentworth (October 10, 1811 - July 1, 1897) was an American banker who founded Wentworth Military Academy in Lexington, Missouri.

== Biography ==
Stephen Girard Wentworth was born in Williamstown, Massachusetts, on October 10, 1811, a descendant of "Elder" William Wentworth. He left home at an early age and decided to seek his fortunes in the West. After a short stint in Virginia, he emigrated to Saline County, Missouri, near Brownsville, today known as Sweet Springs. In 1838, he married Miss Eliza Jane Kincaid of Union, Virginia. They lived in Sweet Springs until 1840, then moved to Lexington, where he soon became involved in a number of entrepreneurial and public pursuits.

From 1851 to 1864, he served as public administrator of Lafayette County. In 1862, he became a partner in the Exchange and Banking House of Alexander Mitchell & Company, later known as the Morrison-Wentworth Bank, of which he became president in 1875. (In 1866, this bank was robbed by Jesse James and his gang in the country's second daylight bank robbery.) He also served briefly as president of the Farmer's Exchange Bank from 1862 to 1865. He helped to incorporate and served as a member of the board of trustees of the Elizabeth Aull Seminary from 1859 to 1897, also serving as treasurer from 1859 to 1880 and president from 1883 to 1897. He became a member of the First Presbyterian Church of Lexington in 1844 and served as a deacon and elder.

In 1879, his son William died, and in 1880 he established Wentworth Male Academy as a memorial to his son. In 1890, the school would change its name to Wentworth Military Academy. He died in 1897.
