= Southeast Community College =

Public college system in Southeast Nebraska, US

- Former name: Southeast Technical Community College
- Type: Public community college
- Established: 1973
- Location: Lincoln, Nebraska, U.S. 40.81611613451066°N 96.6017224589874°W
- Campus: Suburban
- Website: southeast.edu
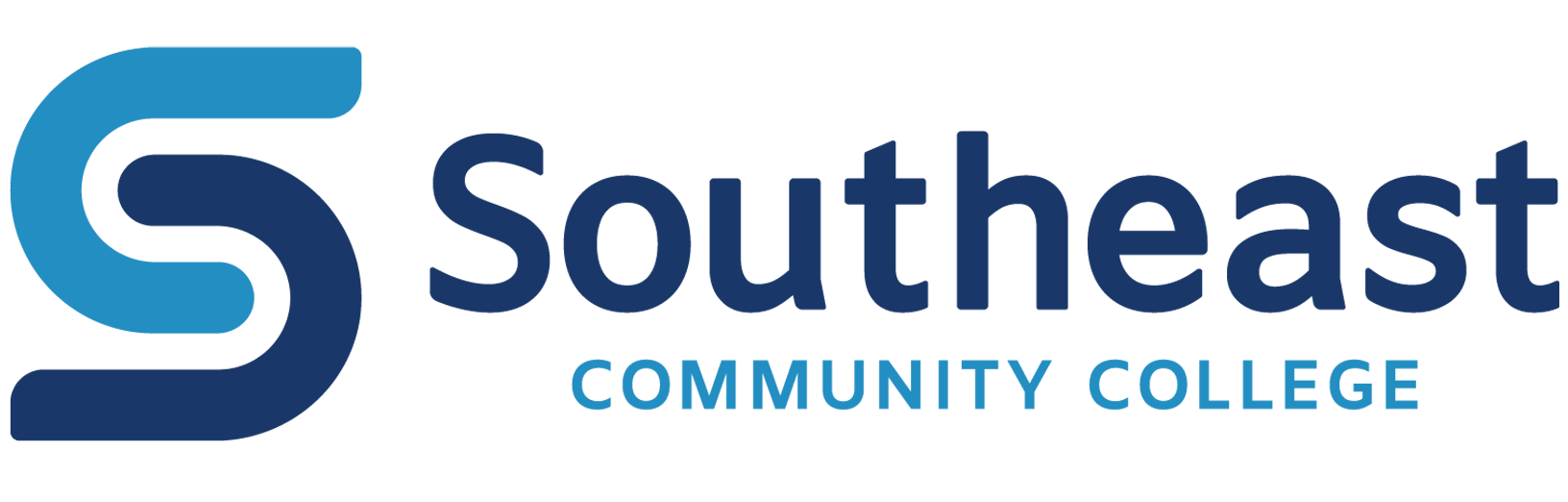

Southeast Community College (SCC) is a public community college system in the southeast portion of Nebraska. The college was established in 1973 and has three main campuses in Lincoln, Milford, and Beatrice. The college also has Learning Centers in surrounding cities.

== History ==
Southeast Community College was originally announced as one of eight technical colleges approved by the Nebraska State Legislature in 1971. The state education board approved the college in December of that same year. The college was established in 1973 as the Southeast Technical Community College, and began with locations in Lincoln, Milford, and Fairbury. At the time, the college had no permanent buildings, and rented out locations.

In 1976, Southeast Community College opened a new location in Beatrice. The college opened in its first permanent building in July 1979. In 1986, the Beatrice and Fairbury campuses were merged, with the Fairbury campus closing that same year. Buildings on the Beatrice Campus were remodeled to make way for the entering 220 students and 30 faculty members.

In 2015, a collaboration with Lincoln Public Schools was announced, known as the Career Academy. Career Academy was built adjacent to the main campus building and provides LPS students with dual-credit courses. The center officially opened in 2015. In 2016, Southeast Community College began opening training and course schools in rural towns, known as Learning Centers. The first one opened in Plattsmouth that same year.

== Academics ==
Undergraduate demographics as of 2025
Race and ethnicity	Total
White	71%
Hispanic	13%
Asian	4%
Two or more races	6%
Black	6%
International student	1%
Economic diversity
Low-income (Note: The percentage of students who received an income-based federal Pell grant intended for low-income students.)	33%
Affluent (Note: The percentage of students who are a part of the American middle class at the bare minimum.)	67%

Southeast Community College is a state funded community college. It includes 51 Fields of Study. The largest of which are Business Administration, Vehicle Maintenance and Repair Technologies, Liberal Arts and Sciences, Allied Health Diagnostic, and Practical Nursing. As of 2025, the college has 6,200 students.

== Campuses ==
Southeast Community College includes campuses in Beatrice, Lincoln, and Milford. Additionally, the college also offers Learning Centers in Falls City, Hebron, Nebraska City, Plattsmouth, Wahoo, and York.

== Notable alumni ==
- Dana Altman, college basketball coach
- Patrick Bourne, former Nebraska state senator
- Taylor Britt, basketball player from New Zealand
- Catherine Kidwell, novelist
- Mark Kolterman, former Nebraska state senator
