= Missouri Route 20 =

State highway in Missouri, U.S.

Route 20

Route information
- Maintained by MoDOT
- Length: 31.609 mi (50.870 km)
- Existed: 1922–present

Major junctions
- West end: Route 13 / Route 13 Bus. northwest of Higginsville
- Route 13 Bus. in Higginsville; Route 213 in Higginsville; Route 23 northwest of Alma; US 65 in Marshall
- East end: US 65 Bus. in Marshall

Location
- Country: United States
- State: Missouri
- Counties: Lafayette, Saline

Highway system
- Missouri State Highway System; Interstate; US; State; Supplemental
← Route 19	→ Route 21

Route 20 is a 31.609-mile (50.870 km) state highway in Lafayette and Saline counties in Missouri, United States, that connects Missouri Route 13 (Route 13) northwest of Higginsville with U.S. Route 65 Business (US 65 Bus.) in Marshall.

== Route description ==
For nearly its entire length Route 20 is a two-lane road that passes through rural farmland and crosses several small creeks and valleys.

=== Lafayette County ===
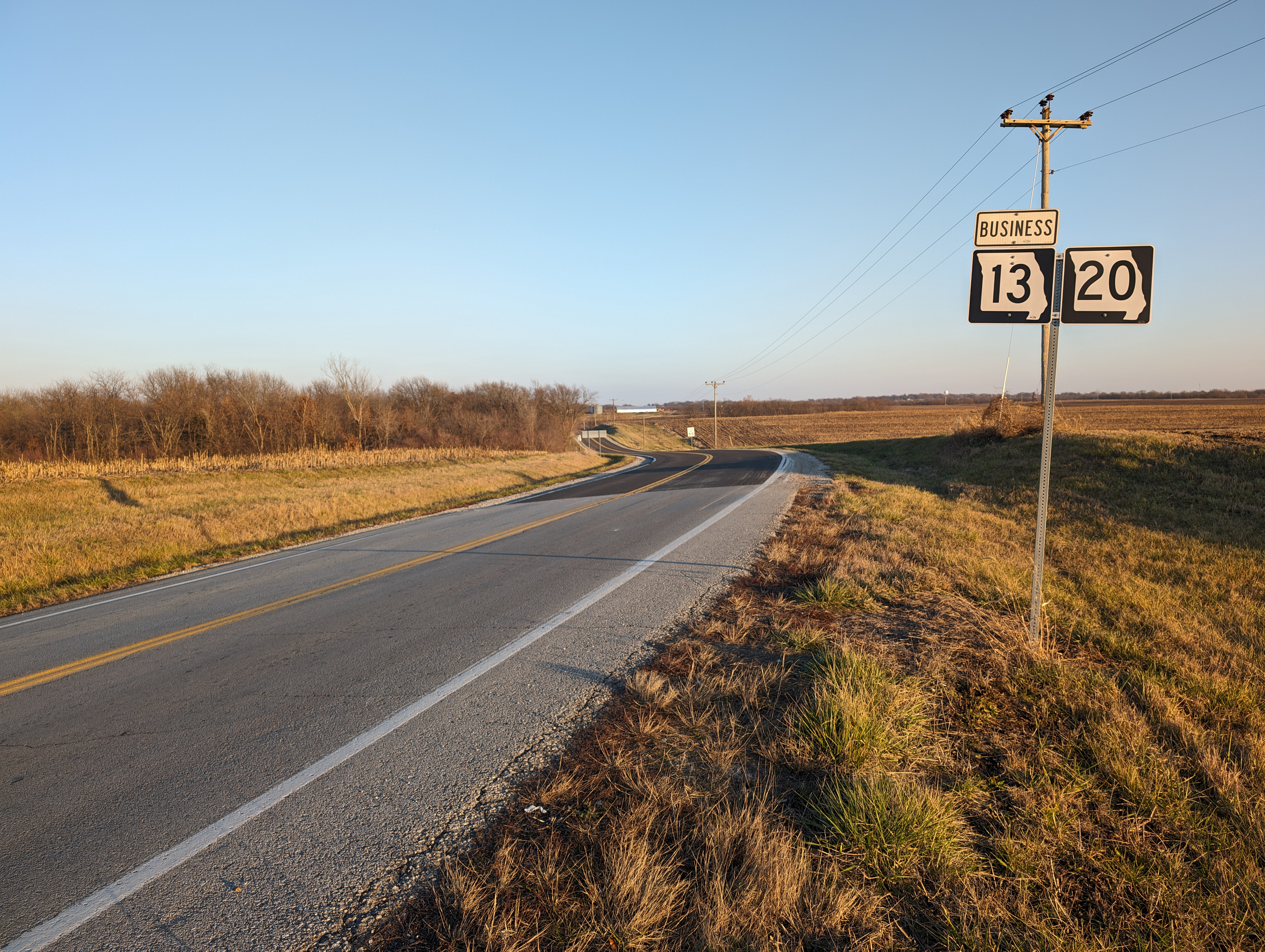
East along Route 20 / Route 13 Bus. from the western terminus of Route 20, northwest of Higginsville

Route 20 begins at a modified T intersection with Route 13 northeast of Higginsville in Lafayette County. The intersection is also the northern teriminus of Missouri Route 13 Business (Route 13 Bus.). From its western terminus Route 20 runs concurrently with Route 13 Bus. to enter Higginsville and run along the south edge of the Confederate Memorial State Historic Site. On the southeast corner of the Historic Site, Route 13 Bus. turns to head south while Route 20 makes a left turn at another T intersection. Promptly after its junction with Route 13 Bus., Route 20 connects with the south end of Missouri Route 213 (which heads northerly along the east edge of the Historic Site to end at U.S. Route 24 [US 24], west of Dover).

Immediately after its junction with Route 213, Route 20 leaves Higginsville and continues northeasterly for about 1.7 miles (2.7 km) before turning east. Just over one mile (1.6 km) farther east, Route 20 connects with the south end of Route F and the north end of Bonanza Road. (Route F heads north to Dover and Bonanza Road head south to Higginsville Reservoir.) Continuing east for 2 more miles (3.2 km), Route 20 connects with the south end of Route BB (Note: There are two Missouri Route BB's that both run north from Route 20 to end at U.S. Route 24, one in Lafayette County (which begins north of Corder) and the other in Saline County (which begins east of Blackburn).) and the north end of Route V, north of Corder. (Route BB heads north to end at US 24 and Route V heads south to quickly pass through Corder and then on to end at the west end of Route AA.)

After continuing east for about 4.6 miles (7.4 km) Route 20 crosses Missouri Route 23 (Route 23) northeast of Alma. (Route 23 heads north to US 24, east of Waverly, and heads south toward Concordia.) Approximately one-fifth of a mile (0.32 km) east of its junction with Rotue 23, Route 20 connects with the north end of Route W (which heads south towards Alma). Route 20 then continues east for another three miles (4.8 km) before leaving Lafayette County.

=== Saline County ===
Promptly after leaving Lafayette County and entering Saline County, Route 20 passes through the city of Blackburn. (Note: Although the city of Blackburn extends into both Lafayette and Saline counties, Route 20 only passes through the part of the city that is located in Saline County.) About one mile (1.6 km) east of Blackburn Route 20 connects with the south end of another Route BB at another T intersection. (This Route BB heads north to US 24 in Grand Pass.) Approximately 2.7 miles (4.3 km) farther east Route 20 connects with Missouri Route 127 (Route 127) at yet another T intersection. (Route 127 heads south towards Sweet Springs.) From the western Route 20 / Route 127 runs concurrently for one mile (1.6 km) before Route 127 splits off at a T intersection. (Route 127 heads north to pass through Mount Leonard before ending at U.S. Route 65, west of Malta Bend.

About two and a half miles (4.0 km) east of its eastern junction with Route 127, Route 20 connects with the south end of the northern segment of Route EE at one more T intersection. Approximately one and a half miles (2.4 km) farther east the concurrent Route 20 / Route EE connects with the southern end of County Road 419 (CR 419) and the southern segment of Route EE. (While CR 419 heads north, Route EE heads south towards Interstate 70 / U.S. Route 40 [I-70 / US 40].) Approximately one mile (1.6 km) farther east, Route 20 curves to proceed north for about one more mile (1.6 km) before curving to proceed east once again. In the middle of the last curve Route 20 connects with the south end of Route Z at a T intersection on the southern edge of the small unincorporated community of Shackleford. (Route Z heads northerly to pass through Shackleford.)

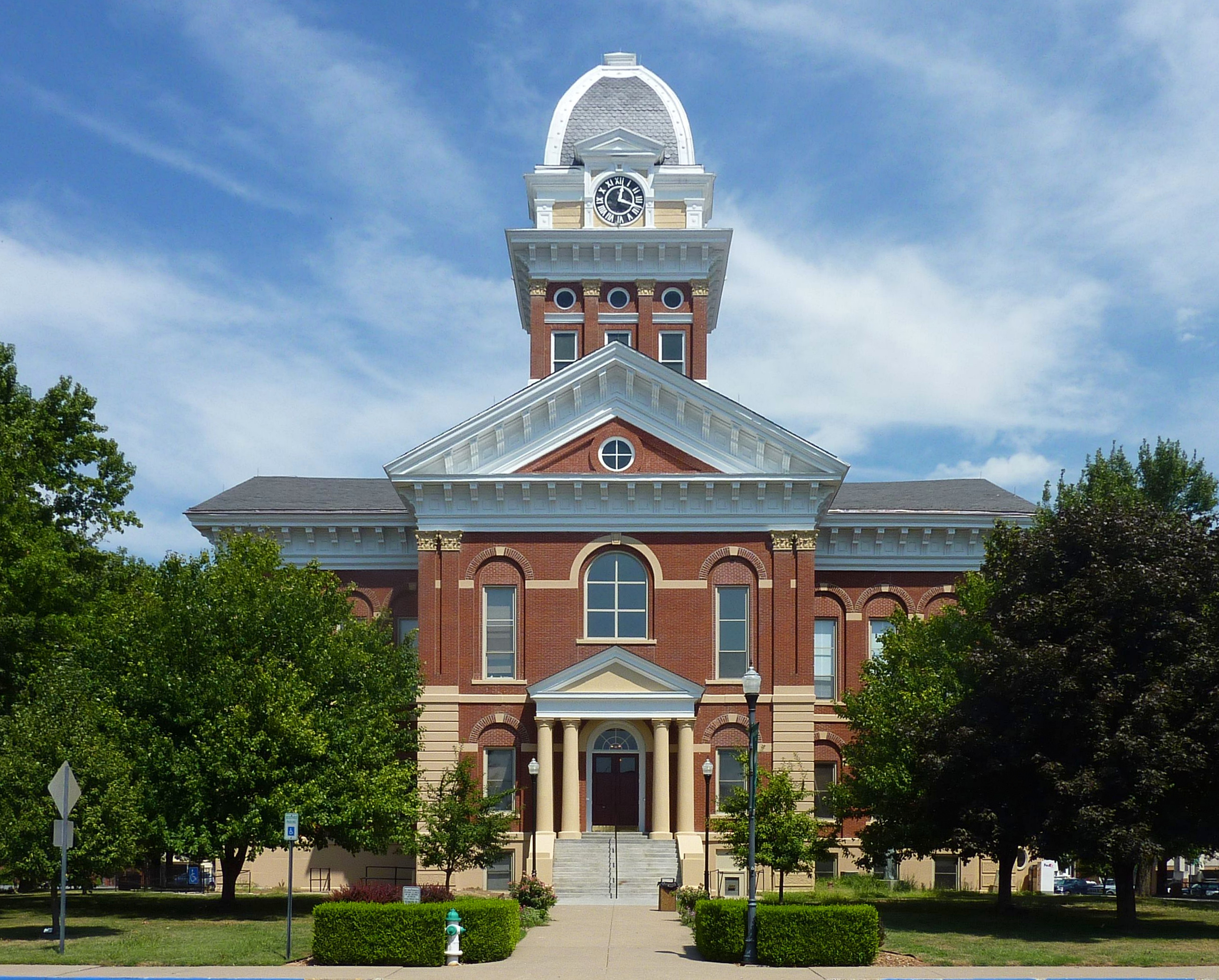
Saline County Courthouse from near the eastern terminus of Route 20 in Marshall, August 2010

East of Shackleford, Route 20 proceeds easterly for just over two miles (3.2 km) before entering the city limits of Marshall. Within Marshall Route 20 continues east along West Arrow Street for roughly two and a half miles (4.0 km) before crossing U.S. Route 65 (Lexington Avenue / US 65) on the western edge of the residential area of the city. (US 65 heads north towards Malta Bend, Waverly, and Carrollton and heads south towards I-70 / US 40, Sedalia, and Springfield.) About 1 mile (1.6 km) farther east Route 20 reaches its eastern terminus at US 65 Bus. (Odell Avenue) at a slightly askew intersection. (From that intersection US 65 Bus. heads north to run briefly concurrent with Missouri Route 41 / Missouri Route 240 before ending at US 65. US 65 Bus. heads south to end at US 65. Also from the intersection East Arrow Street continues east for about five more blocks.)

== History ==
Route 20 was one of the original 1922 highways. Its eastern terminus was originally at Huntsville at Route 10 (now US 24). Its western terminus was originally in Kansas City at Route 1. In 1926, the section west of Waverly became part of US 24 and the section from Waverly to Marshall became part of US 65. In 1933-1934, Route 20 was extended west on its current alignment to Higginsville. This section had been planned as Route 96 (Odessa to Marshall) in 1922, but was soon dropped from the state highway system. In 1934/1935, the section from Glasgow to Huntsville became part of Missouri Route 3 when that route was extended. The next year, the section from Marshall to Glasgow became part of Route 240.

== Major intersections ==
County	Location	mi	km	Destinations	Notes
Lafayette		0.000	0.000	Route 13 north – Lexington, Richmond, Hamilton Route 13 south – Higginsville, Warrensburg, Springfield Route 13 Bus. end	Western terminus; modified T intersection; western end of Route 13 Bus. concurrency; north end of Route 13 Bus.
Lafayette	Higginsville	1.784	2.871	Route 13 Bus. south (North Main St) – Route 13	T intersection; eastern end of Route 13 Bus. concurrency
Lafayette	Higginsville	1.814	2.919	Route 213 north – US 24	T intersection; south end of Route 213
Lafayette		4.623	7.440	Route F north – Dover; Bonanza Rd south – Higginsville Reservoir	South end of Route F
Lafayette		6.635	10.678	Route BB north – US 24 Route V south – Corder	North end of Route V; south end of Route BB
Lafayette		11.262	18.124	Route 23 north – US 24 Route 23 south – Concordia	Northeast of Alma
Lafayette		11.772	18.945	Route W south – Alma	T intersection; north end of Route W
Saline		16.119	25.941	Route BB north – Grand Pass	T intersection; south end of Route BB
Saline		18.873	30.373	Route 127 south – Sweet Springs	T intersection; western end of Route 127 concurrency
Saline		19.875	31.986	Route 127 north – Mount Leonard	T intersection; eastern end of Route 127 concurrency
Saline		22.338	35.950	Route EE north – Salt Springs	T intersection; western end of Route EE concurrency
Saline		23.839	38.365	CR 419 north Route EE south – I-70 / US 40	Eastern end of Route EE concurrency
Saline		25.950	41.762	Route Z north – Shackleford	T intersection; south end of Route Z
Saline	Marshall	30.581	49.215	US 65 north (Lexington Ave) – Malta Bend, Waverly, Carrollton US 65 south (Lexington Ave) – I-70 / US 40, Sedalia, Springfield	Route 20 runs along Arrow St in Marshall
Saline	Marshall	31.609	50.870	US 65 Bus. (North Odell Ave) – Route 41 / Route 240, US 65 US 65 Bus. (South Odell Ave) – US 65	Eastern terminus
Saline	Marshall	31.609	50.870	East Arrow St east	Continuation east from eastern terminus
1.000 mi = 1.609 km; 1.000 km = 0.621 mi: Concurrency terminus

== See also ==
- List of state highways in Missouri
