= Missouri Route 213 =

State highway in Missouri, U.S.

Route 213
- MO 213 highlighted in red

Route information
- Maintained by MoDOT
- Length: 6.943 mi (11.174 km)

Major junctions
- South end: Route 20 in Higginsville
- North end: US 24 west of Dover

Location
- Country: United States
- State: Missouri
- Counties: Lafayette

Highway system
- Missouri State Highway System; Interstate; US; State; Supplemental
← Route 210	→ Route 215

Route 213 is a 6.943-mile (11.174 km) state highway in Lafayette County, Missouri, United States, that connects Missouri Route 20 (Route 20) in Higginsville with U.S. Route 24 (US 24), west of Dover.

== Route description ==
Route 213 begins at a T intersection with Route 20 on the southeast corner of the Confederate Memorial State Historic Site in northern Higginsville, immediately northeast of Route 20's junction with Missouri Route 13 Business (Route 13 Bus.). (Route 20 and Route 13 Bus. continue concurrently west for almost two miles [3.2 km] to both end at Missouri Route 13. Route 20 heads easterly toward Corder.) From its southern terminus, Route 213 proceeds north-northwest as a two-lane road along the east side of the Confederate Memorial State Historic Site. Just over one mile (1.6 km) later Route 213 leaves Higginsville and continues with a more northerly course as it passes through rural farmland for the rest of its route.

About 1.3 miles (2.1 km) north of Higginsville, Route 213 passes through the small unincorporated community of Page City. Continuing north, Route 213 has two slight jogs to the east. Approximately four and a half miles (7.2 km) north of Page City Route 213 reaches its northern terminus at a T intersection with US 24 / Lewis and Clark National Historic Trail, about 1.7 miles (2.7 km) west of Dover and roughly 9 miles (14 km) east of Lexington. (US heads east toward Dover, Waverly, Carrollton, and Moberly. US 24 heads west toward Lexington, Independence, and Kansas City.)

== Major intersections ==
The entire route is in Lafayette County.

Location	mi	km	Destinations	Notes
Higginsville	0.000	0.000	Route 20 east – Corder Route 20 west – Route 13 Bus., Route 13	Southern terminus; T intersection
	6.943	11.174	US 24 east / Lewis and Clark National Historic Trail east – Dover, Waverly, Carrollton, Moberly US 24 west / Lewis and Clark National Historic Trail west – Lexington, Independence, Kansas City	Northern terminus; T intersection
1.000 mi = 1.609 km; 1.000 km = 0.621 mi

== See also ==
- List of state highways in Missouri
