= James McDonald Chaney =

American Presbyterian minister

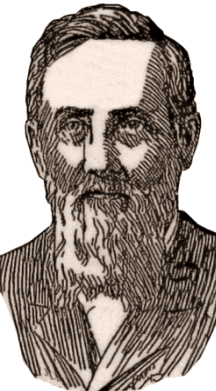
- Born: 18 March 1831; Salem, Ohio
- Died: 18 September 1909 (aged 78); Independence, Missouri
- Education: Princeton Theological Seminary
- Spouse: Mary Parke Chaney
- Children: J. Mack Chaney
- Church: Presbyterian
- Ordained: 1858

Rev. James McDonald Chaney (18 March 1831 – 18 September 1909) was a minister of the Lafayette Presbytery of the Presbyterian Church in the United States. He had been an ordained minister for 53 years.

== Biography ==
=== Birth and early life ===
Dr. Chaney was born near Salem, Ohio, on March 18, 1831. His parents were William Chaney (1803 - 1886) and Harriett McDonald Chaney (1803 - 1880). He made a public profession of his faith in the Des Peres Presbyterian Church, Saint Louis County, Missouri, at age 19. After finishing preparatory education in Rev. Jacon Coon’s Academy of Salem, Ohio, he became a student in the Des Peres Institute, finishing his course there in 1852. He received a bachelor's degree from William Jewell College of Missouri, a Master of Arts from King College of Tennessee, and a Doctor of Divinity from Princeton Theological Seminary. Dr. Chaney was also awarded an honorary Doctor of Divinity from King College in 1885.

=== Ministry ===
Dr. Chaney was licensed by the Presbytery of St. Louis in August, 1856, and ordained by the Presbytery of Lafayette on April 4, 1858 as a minister of the Presbyterian Church. He was pastor of the church at Dover, Missouri from April 24, 1858 until October, 1867; he served as Stated Supply of the church at Kansas City, Missouri from 1868 to 1869; and Stated Supply at Dover, MO, from 1869 to 1870.

From 1871 to 1876, Dr. Chaney served as Vice-President and then President of the Elizabeth Aull Female Seminary in Lexington, Missouri. Following that, he served as pastor of the church at Pleasant Hill, Missouri from 1877 to 1885. In 1885 he became president of the Kansas City Ladies' College at Independence. In 1891 he became President of Independence Academy of Missouri.

Following his service to Independence Academy, he provided supply preaching for various lengths of time in the churches at La Monte, Hughesville, Pleasant Hill, Corder and Alma (all in Missouri).

=== Other interests ===
Dr. Chaney was an astronomer and inventor as well as a minister and teacher. Approximately 10 years prior to his death, he invented a planetarium for locating and observing celestial bodies, allowing the determination of the relative positions of all known planets in the Solar System based on meridian passage or declination. The invention could also be used to indicate the movement of the planets. Dr. Chaney’s planetarium was frequently used by schools, and was commended by Professor Young of Princeton.

=== Family, Death ===
Dr. Chaney married Eliza M. Dunklin on May 20, 1852, in Jefferson County, Missouri; she died on June 27, 1874. In 1875, Dr. Chaney married Miss Mary Parke in Lexington, Missouri. They had a two sons and a daughter; one of their sons, J. Mack Chaney, who as an adult was an attorney in Kansas City, Missouri.

He died at his home in Independence, on Saturday, 18 September 1909, from a cerebral hemorrhage, after struggling for several days with digestive trouble. The funeral service was conducted on Tuesday, September 21, 1909, at 2:30pm in the First Presbyterian Church of Independence, Missouri. Rev. E.C. Gordon, former president of Westminster College in Fulton, Missouri, conducted the service. Dr. Chaney was buried in the Mt. Washington Cemetery near Kansas City, Missouri.

== Legacy ==
Rev. Chaney is remembered for having written two books, though he also penned two lesser-known works.

The most well-known is "William, the Baptist" (1877). This was frequently reprinted. His necrology in the Missouri Historical Review notes that it owns a 12th edition. In 2009, an updated edition was published by Doulos Resources, preserving the original style and story while updating the language, including references (in footnote) for unattributed Scripture quotes, and offering a Scripture index. This edition was edited by J.E. Eubanks, Jr.

The second book is a sequel, entitled Agnes, Daughter of William the Baptist, or The Young Theologian. It was first published in 1894.

== Works ==
- William the Baptist (first publication in 1877) — updated edition in print and eBook, edited by J.E. Eubanks, Jr.
- Agnes, Daughter of William the Baptist, or The young theologian (first publication in 1894)
- Poliopolis and Polioland, or A Trip to the North Pole (1900)
- Mac or Mary, or The Young Scientists (1900)

== Resources ==
- Chaney, James M. (2009). William the Baptist. Oakland, TN: Doulos Resources. p. 160. ISBN 978-1-4421-8560-9. OCLC 642906193. Archived from the original on 2011-04-02.
- William the Baptist
