= Kurtis Gregory =

American politician (born 1986)

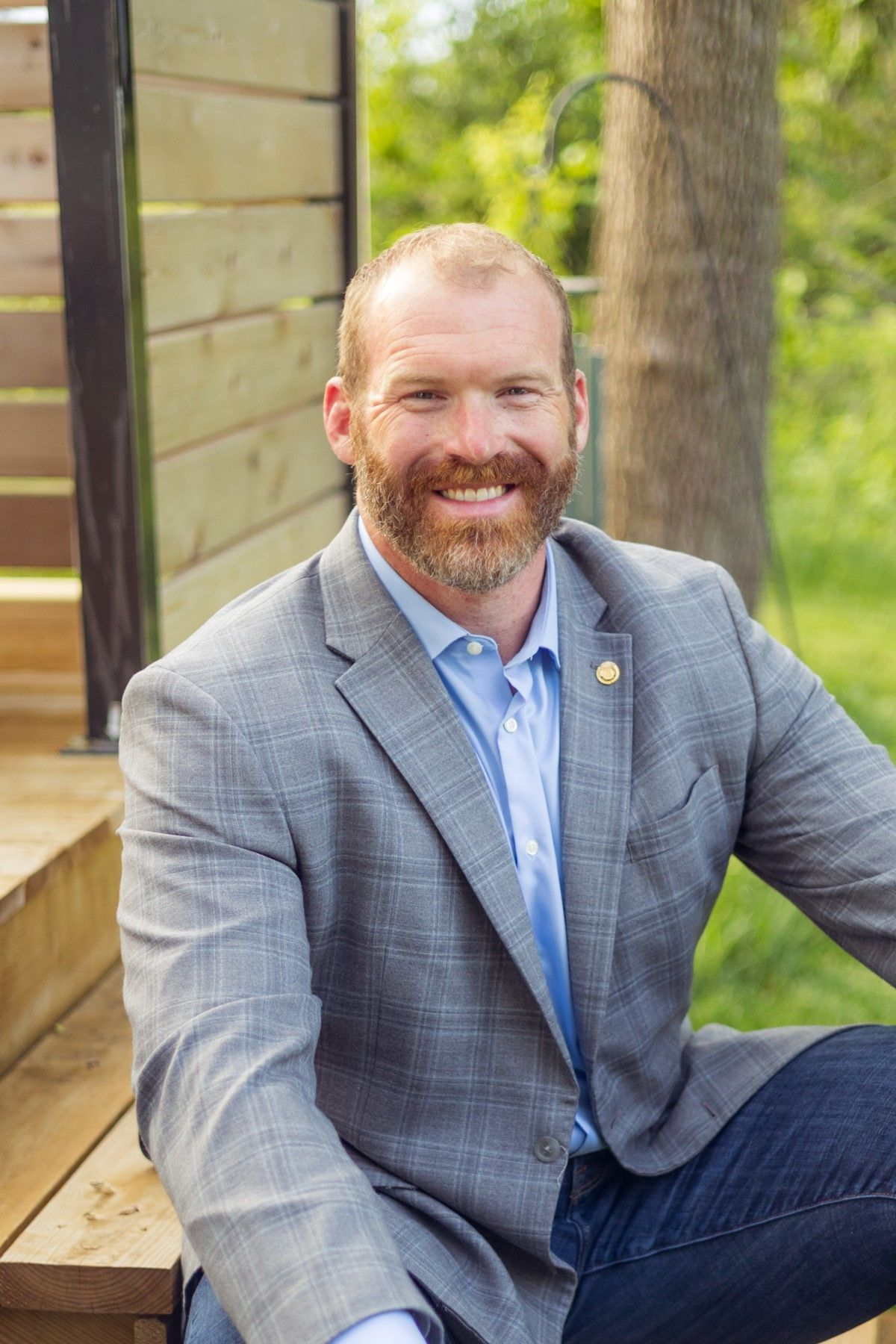

Member of the Missouri Senate from the 21st district
- Incumbent
- Assumed office January 8, 2025
- Preceded by: Denny Hoskins

Member of the Missouri House of Representatives from the 51st district
- In office January 9, 2021 – January 8, 2025
- Preceded by: Dean Dohrman
- Succeeded by: Mark Nolte

Personal details
- Born: August 7, 1986 (age 40) Blackburn, Missouri, U.S.
- Party: Republican
- Education: University of Missouri (BS, MS)
- Football career

No. 78
- Position: Guard

Personal information
- Listed height: 6 ft 4 in (1.93 m)
- Listed weight: 308 lb (140 kg)

Career information
- High school: Santa Fe (Alma, Missouri)
- College: Missouri (2005–2009)
- NFL draft: 2010: undrafted

Career history
- Carolina Panthers (2010)*
- * Offseason or practice squad member only

Awards and highlights
- Second-team all-Big 12 (2009)

Kurtis Gregory (born August 7, 1986) is an American politician serving as a member of the Missouri Senate since 2025. Before that he was in the Missouri House of Representatives from the 51st district. A Republican, he has served since 2021. Gregory attended the University of Missouri, where he played college football for the Tigers.

== Early life and education ==
Gregory is a graduate of Santa Fe R-10 High School and earned his Bachelor’s degree and a Master’s degree in General Agriculture from the University of Missouri.

== Career ==
Gregory's family farm includes corn and soybeans for a local family-owned hog operation. Gregory has served on the board of directors for Missouri Corn Growers and is a local delegate for MFA Oil. He is also a member of the Saline County Farm Bureau, Missouri Corn Growers Association and Missouri Cattlemen’s. Gregory was awarded the Farm Bureau Friend of Agriculture Award in 2022, and he was in the Corn Growers inaugural CornRoots Leadership Class in 2013. Gregory also had a short stint in the NFL with the Carolina Panthers. Kurtis played on the Missouri Tigers football team from 2006 to 2009. He played left tackle in 2006 and then started 41 straight games at right guard from 2007 until he graduated. In 2007, his Tigers beat Arkansas in the Cotton Bowl and finished the season ranked 4th in the nation. In 2008, they beat Northwestern in the Alamo Bowl, and in 2009, Gregory served as team captain.

In 2023, along with SEC Commissioner Greg Sanky, and Condoleezza Rice, Sports Illustrated named Gregory one of the 25 Most Intriguing Suits in College Football.

=== Missouri House of Representatives ===
Gregory was elected to his first two-year term in November 2020 to represent District 51, comprising Lafayette and Saline counties.

==== Committee assignments ====
- Rules - Regulatory Oversight, Chairman
- Agriculture Policy, Vice-Chairman
- Budget
- Subcommittee on Appropriations - Agriculture, Conservation, Natural Resources, and Economic Development
- Insurance Policy

=== Political issues ===
==== Environment ====
In 2024, Gregory introduced a bill to remove runoff from the state definition of contamination sources, backed by Missouri Corn Growers Association. The fiscal note estimated a loss of $4.7 million funding to Missouri Department of Natural Resources and 17 staff members.

==== Health insurance ====
In 2025, Gregory passed a bill to allow Missouri Farm Bureau carveouts to sell health insurance to employees outside the rules of the Affordable Care Act. The plans have lower rates due to medical underwriting and lack of regulation for pre-existing conditions. Opposition raised concerns about the rest of uninsured Missourians who cannot afford private health insurance, however the bill passed with additional measures to expand state medicaid coverage.

=== Electoral history ===
2020 Missouri House of Representatives District 51 General Election
Party	Candidate	Votes	%	±%
Republican	Kurtis Gregory	10,803	75.26%	
Libertarian	Bill Wayne	3,551	24.74%	
Total votes		14,354	100.00%	

Missouri House of Representatives Election, November 8, 2022, District 51
Party	Candidate	Votes	%	±%
Republican	Kurtis Gregory	9,464	83.35%	+8.09
Constitution	Jenn DePee	1,890	16.65%	n/a
Total votes		11,354	100.00%	

== Personal life ==
Born in Blackburn, Missouri, Gregory currently resides in Marshall with his wife, Kella, and three children, Brook, Landon and Henley, where they attend Calvary Baptist Church.
