= James M. Dinwiddie House =

Historic house in Missouri, United States

- U.S. National Register of Historic Places
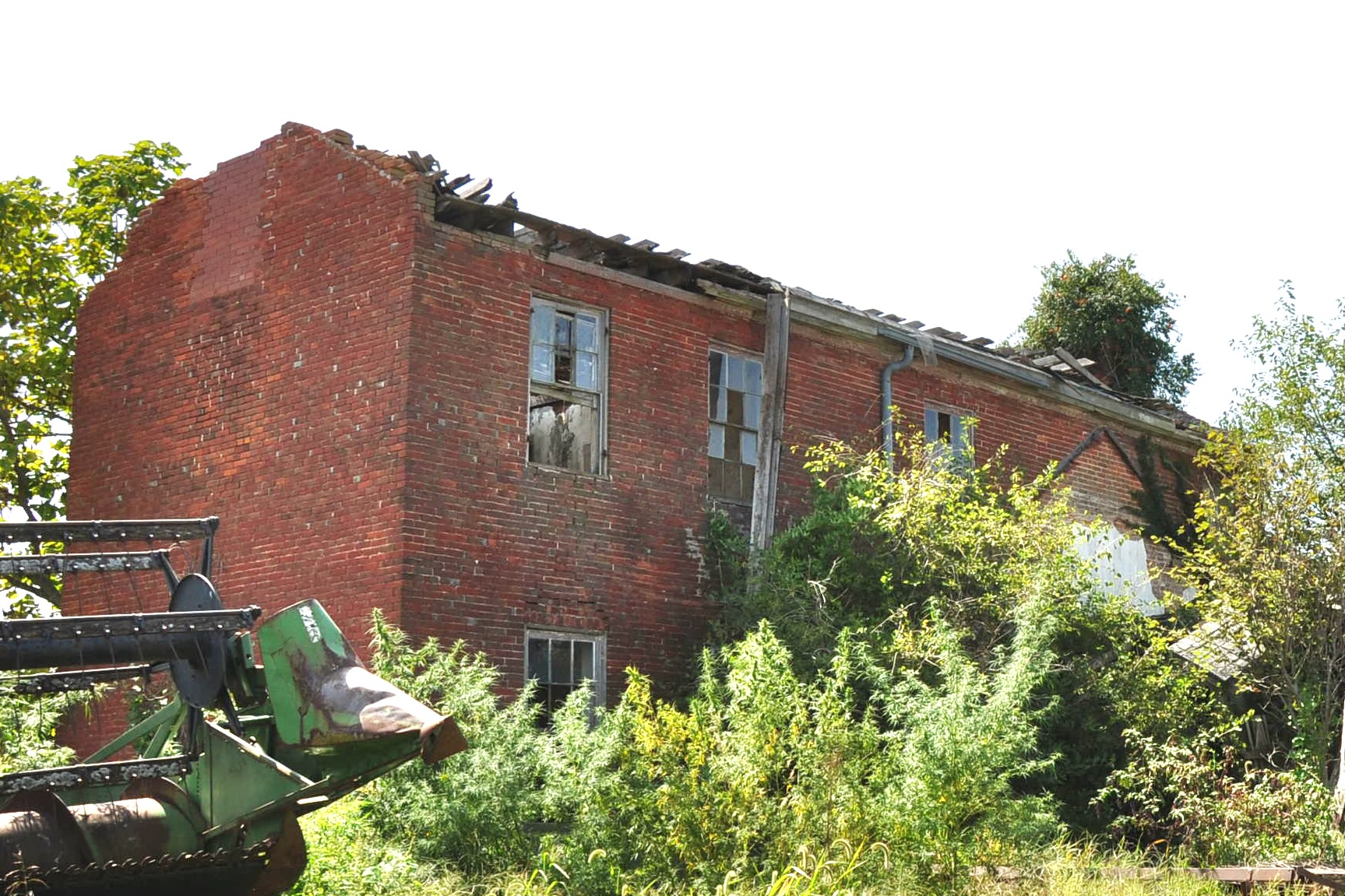
- James M. Dinwiddie House in 2024

- Location within Missouri Location within the United States
- Location: 0.25 mi. E of jct. of US 24 and MO 184, near Dover, Missouri
- Coordinates: 39°11′32″N 93°42′6″W
- Area: less than one acre
- Built: c. 1840
- Architectural style: Greek Revival
- MPS: Antebellum Resources of Johnson, Lafayette, Pettis, and Saline Counties MPS
- NRHP reference No.: 97001430
- Added to NRHP: November 14, 1997

James M. Dinwiddie House, also known as Maple Grove Stock Farm, is a historic home located near Dover, Lafayette County, Missouri. It was built about 1840, and is a two-story, central passage plan, vernacular Greek Revival style brick I-house. It has a one-story rear ell. The front facade features a classic one-story portico.

It was listed on the National Register of Historic Places in 1997.
