= Higginsville station =

- Chicago and Alton Railroad Depot at Higginsville
- U.S. National Register of Historic Places
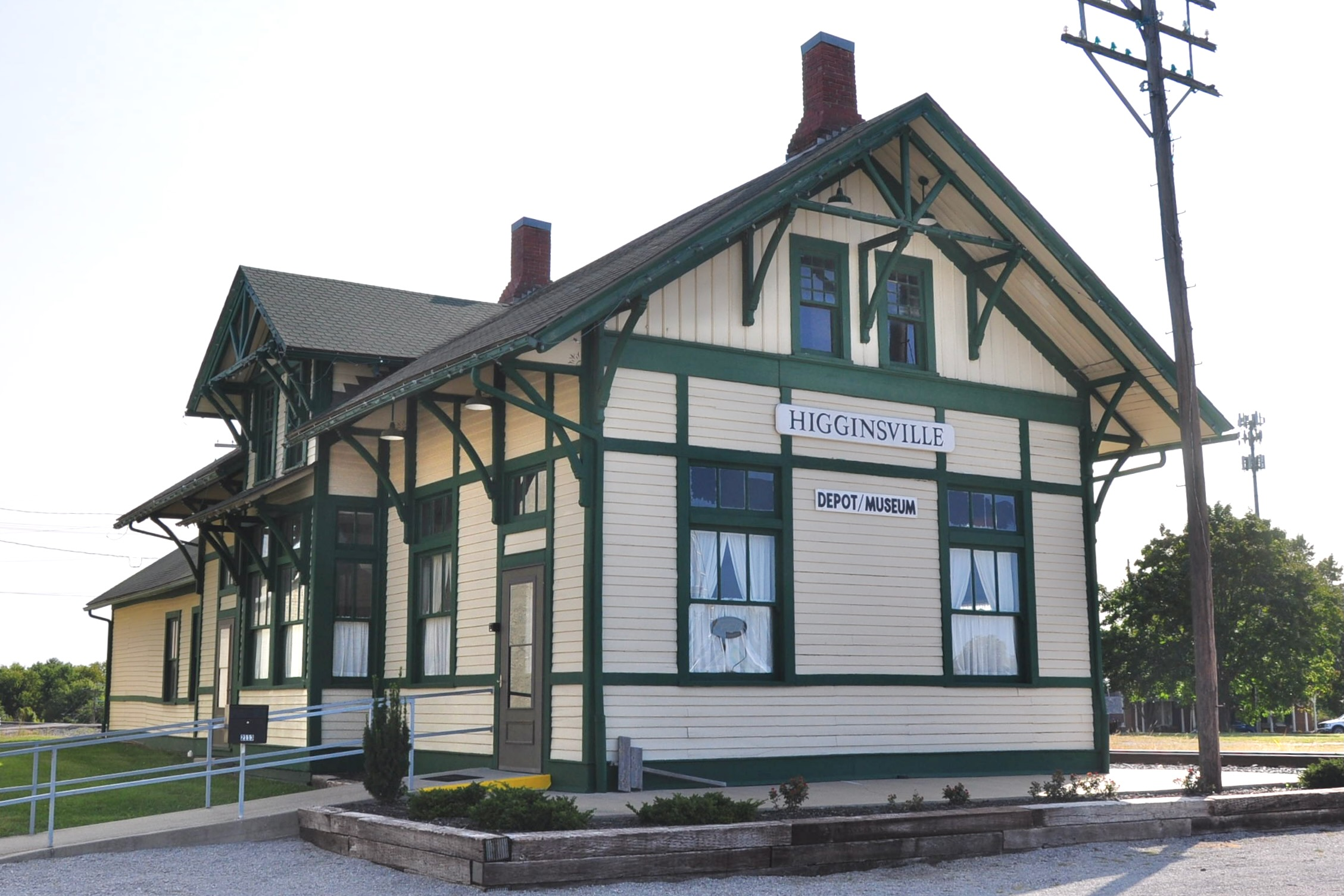
- The former depot in 2024

- Location within Missouri Location within the United States
- Location: 2109 Main St. Higginsville, Missouri
- Coordinates: 39.073520°N 93.716780°W
- Area: less than one acre
- Built: 1888-1889
- Architectural style: Stick/Eastlake
- NRHP reference No.: 87000451
- Added to NRHP: March 25, 1987

Chicago and Alton Railroad Depot at Higginsville, also known as the C & A Depot, is a historic train station located at Higginsville, Lafayette County, Missouri. It was built in 1888-1889 by the Chicago and Alton Railroad, and is a 1 1/2-story, Stick style frame building. It features projecting eaves supported by large brackets and exterior walls faced with vertical boards, battens and horizontal clapboards.

It was listed on the National Register of Historic Places in 1987.

Preceding station	Alton Railroad	Following station
Mayview toward Kansas City	Kansas City – St. Louis	Corder toward St. Louis
