= Houx-Hoefer-Rehkop House =

Historic house in Missouri, United States

- Houx–Hoefer–Rehkop House
- U.S. National Register of Historic Places
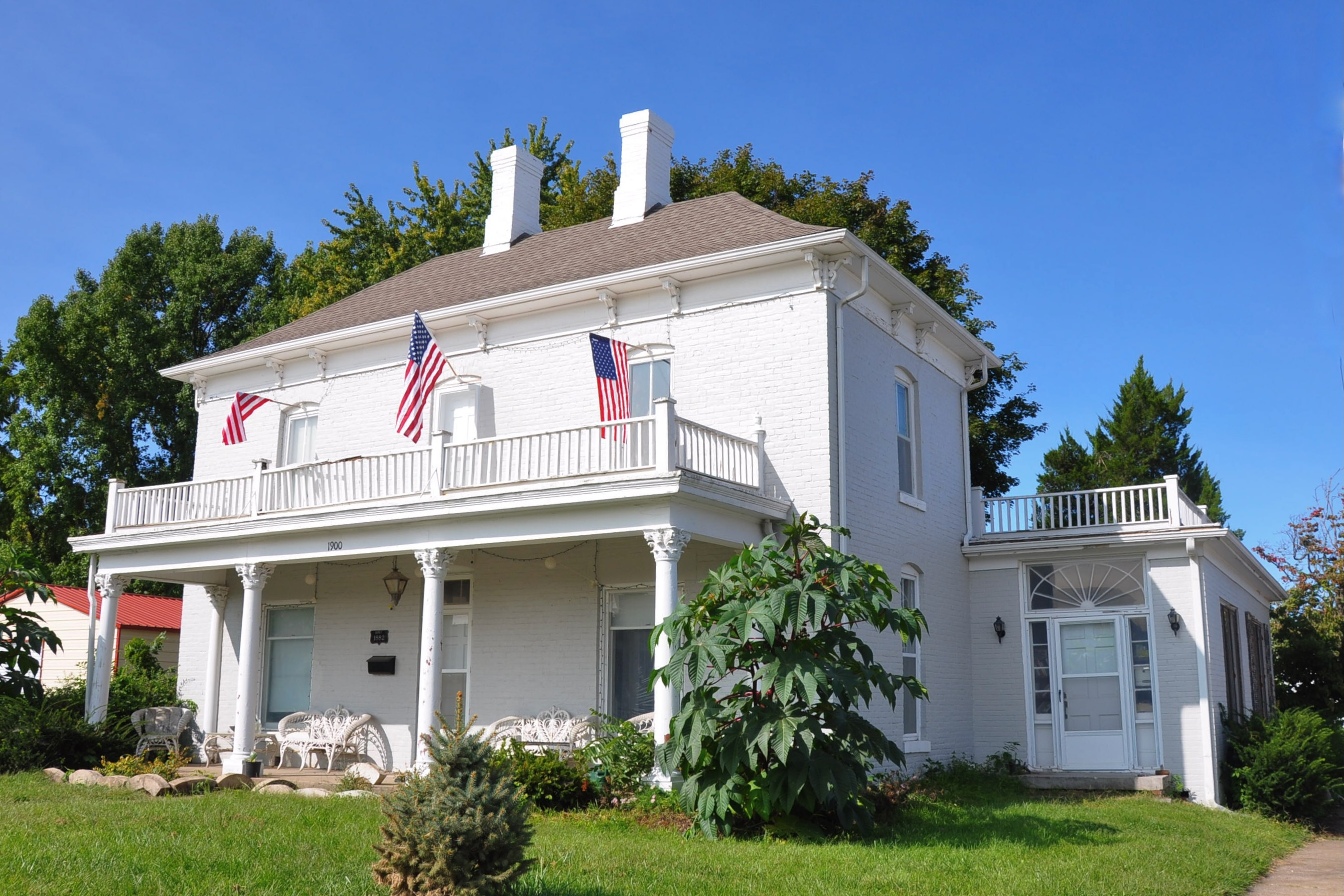
- Houx-Hoefer-Rehkop House in 2024

- Location within Missouri Location within the United States
- Location: 1900 Walnut St. Higginsville, Missouri
- Coordinates: 39°4′33″N 93°43′7″W
- Area: less than one acre
- Built: 1882
- Architect: Houx, George W.
- Architectural style: Italianate
- NRHP reference No.: 83001027
- Added to NRHP: March 29, 1983

The Houx–Hoefer–Rehkop House is a historic home located at Higginsville, Lafayette County, Missouri. It was built about 1882, and is a two-story, "T"-plan, Italianate style brick dwelling with a hipped roof. It features a front porch with four round columns and two pilasters all with Corinthian order capitals.

It was listed on the National Register of Historic Places in 1983.
