= Tabeau, Missouri =

Unincorporated community in the U.S. state of Missouri

Coordinates: 39°12′16″N 93°43′26″W

Tabeau is an unincorporated community in Lafayette County, in the U.S. state of Missouri.

Tabeau derives its name from nearby Tabo Creek.
