= James Chaney (disambiguation) =

James Chaney (1943–1964) was one of three civil rights workers killed in Mississippi by members of the Ku Klux Klan.

James Chaney may also refer to:

- James E. Chaney (1885–1967), United States Army officer
- James M. Chaney (1921–1976), American police officer and witness to President Kennedy's assassination
- James McDonald Chaney, American Presbyterian minister
- Jim Chaney, American football coach and player
