= Hodge, Missouri =

Unincorporated community in Missouri, U.S.

Coordinates: 39°13′25″N 93°37′37″W

Hodge is an unincorporated community in Lafayette County, in the U.S. state of Missouri.

== History ==
An early variant name was Edward's Mill, after John Edward, the proprietor of a local gristmill. A post office called Hodge was established in 1888, and remained in operation until 1963.
