= Tabo Creek =

Stream in the U.S. state of Missouri

Coordinates: 39.205292°N 93.725773°W

Tabo Creek (/ˈtæboʊ/ TAB-oh) is a stream in Lafayette County in the U.S. state of Missouri. It is a tributary of the Missouri River.

Tabo is a corruption of Tabeau, the surname of a French Canadian colonist.

== See also ==
- List of rivers of Missouri
