= Ernestville, Missouri =

Unincorporated community in Missouri, U.S.

Coordinates: 38°55′56″N 93°37′49″W

St. Mathew Lutheran Church

Ernestville is an unincorporated community in Lafayette County, in the U.S. state of Missouri.

The community was named after Ernest Worm, a local merchant. The nucleus of the town was the St. Matthew's Church, and a store built by Ernest Worm. The suffix ville added to Mr. Worm's given name formed the town name. The community never had a post office.

Some estimates suggest that about 3,600 people live in the area and nearby.
