= Dean Dohrman =

American politician from Missouri (1959-2024)

- Dohrman's official 2016 portrait

Member of the Missouri House of Representatives from the 51st district
- In office 2013 – January 9, 2021
- Succeeded by: Kurtis Gregory

Personal details
- Born: June 2, 1959 Warrensburg, Missouri, U.S.
- Died: February 2, 2024 (aged 64) Sedalia, Missouri, U.S.
- Party: Republican
- Profession: Online professor

Dean Allen Dohrman (June 2, 1959 – February 2, 2024) was an American politician. He was a Republican member of the Missouri House of Representatives, serving from 2013 to 2021.
