= Stephanie Gooden =

American politician

Member-elect of the Missouri House of Representatives from the 51st district
- Assuming office January 6, 2027
- Succeeding: Mark Nolte

Personal details
- Party: Republican
- Website: www.goodenformo.com

Stephanie Gooden is an American politician of the Missouri Republican Party who is the representative-elect for the 51st district in the Missouri House of Representatives. She was elected in the 2026 general election. Gooden is a Saline County Commissioner, educator and community leader.
