= Greenton, Missouri =

Unincorporated community in Missouri, U.S.

Coordinates: 39°02′55″N 93°57′51″W

Greenton is an unincorporated community in Lafayette County, in the U.S. state of Missouri.

== History ==
Greenton was laid out in 1835 by Joseph Green, and named for him. A post office called Greenton was established in 1839, and remained in operation until 1902.
