= Mark Nolte =

American politician

Member of the Missouri House of Representatives from the 51st district
- Incumbent
- Assumed office January 8, 2025
- Preceded by: Kurtis Gregory
- Succeeded by: Stephanie Gooden (elect)

Personal details
- Party: Republican

Mark Nolte is an American politician who was elected member of the Missouri House of Representatives for the 51st district in 2024.

Nolte graduated from the University of Missouri in December 1981 and later attending the University of Missouri School of Law.

Nolte is a land surveyor and public servant.
