= Chapel Hill, Missouri =

Unincorporated community in Missouri, U.S.

Coordinates: 38°55′03″N 94°03′30″W

Chapel Hill is an unincorporated community in southwest Lafayette County, in the U.S. state of Missouri. The community is on Missouri Route Z approximately six miles south of Bates City.

== History ==
A post office called Chapel Hill was established in 1850, and remained in operation until 1914. The community took its name from the local Chapel Hill College; the school was destroyed during the Civil War in the 1860s.
