= Lake Lafayette, Missouri =

- City
- Location of Lake Lafayette, Missouri
- Coordinates: 38°56′55″N 93°58′17″W
- Country: United States
- State: Missouri
- County: Lafayette

Area
  - Total: 0.76 sq mi (1.97 km^{2})
  - Land: 0.64 sq mi (1.66 km^{2})
  - Water: 0.12 sq mi (0.31 km^{2})
- Elevation: 856 ft (261 m)

Population (2020)
  - Total: 277
  - Density: 432.3/sq mi (166.93/km^{2})
- Time zone: UTC-6 (Central (CST))
  - Summer (DST): UTC-5 (CDT)
- ZIP code: 64076
- Area code: 816
- FIPS code: 29-39952
- GNIS feature ID: 2395592
- Website: lakelafayettemo.gov

Lake Lafayette is a city in Lafayette County, Missouri, and is part of the Kansas City metropolitan area within the United States. The population was 277 at the 2020 census.

== Geography ==
According to the United States Census Bureau, the city has a total area of 0.76 square miles (1.97 km^{2}), of which 0.64 square miles (1.66 km^{2}) is land and 0.12 square miles (0.31 km^{2}) is water.

== Demographics ==
Historical population
Census	Pop.	Note	%±
2000	346		—
2010	327		−5.5%
2020	277		−15.3%
U.S. Decennial Census

=== 2010 census ===
As of the census of 2010, there were 327 people, 124 households, and 82 families living in the city. The population density was 510.9 inhabitants per square mile (197.3/km^{2}). There were 167 housing units at an average density of 260.9 per square mile (100.7/km^{2}). The racial makeup of the city was 95.1% White, 2.4% African American, 0.6% Native American, and 1.8% from two or more races. Hispanic or Latino of any race were 0.6% of the population.

There were 124 households, of which 30.6% had children under the age of 18 living with them, 51.6% were married couples living together, 8.9% had a female householder with no husband present, 5.6% had a male householder with no wife present, and 33.9% were non-families. 27.4% of all households were made up of individuals, and 12.9% had someone living alone who was 65 years of age or older. The average household size was 2.64 and the average family size was 3.17.

The median age in the city was 43.8 years. 21.4% of residents were under the age of 18; 8.8% were between the ages of 18 and 24; 22.6% were from 25 to 44; 32.7% were from 45 to 64; and 14.4% were 65 years of age or older. The gender makeup of the city was 52.9% male and 47.1% female.

=== 2000 census ===
As of the census of 2000, there were 346 people, 125 households, and 91 families living in the city. The population density was 541.3 inhabitants per square mile (209.0/km^{2}). There were 156 housing units at an average density of 244.0 per square mile (94.2/km^{2}). The racial makeup of the city was 90.46% White, 3.47% African American, 1.45% Native American, 0.87% Asian, and 3.76% from two or more races. Hispanic or Latino of any race were 2.89% of the population.

There were 125 households, out of which 40.0% had children under the age of 18 living with them, 53.6% were married couples living together, 10.4% had a female householder with no husband present, and 27.2% were non-families. 19.2% of all households were made up of individuals, and 2.4% had someone living alone who was 65 years of age or older. The average household size was 2.77 and the average family size was 3.10.

In the city the population was spread out, with 29.2% under the age of 18, 8.4% from 18 to 24, 26.9% from 25 to 44, 27.5% from 45 to 64, and 8.1% who were 65 years of age or older. The median age was 35 years. For every 100 females, there were 119.0 males. For every 100 females age 18 and over, there were 114.9 males.

The median income for a household in the city was $30,750, and the median income for a family was $37,143. Males had a median income of $23,750 versus $22,813 for females. The per capita income for the city was $19,683. About 8.2% of families and 13.2% of the population were below the poverty line, including 14.1% of those under age 18 and none of those age 65 or over.

== Education ==
It is in the Odessa R-VII School District.

Metropolitan Community College has the school district area in its service area, but not its in-district taxation area.
