= Myrick, Missouri =

Unincorporated community in Missouri, U.S.

Coordinates: 39°10′32″N 93°54′11″W

Myrick is an unincorporated community in Lafayette County, in the U.S. state of Missouri.

Myrick has the name of a railroad employee.
