= Bernhard Anderson =

American theologian

Bernhard Word Anderson (September 25, 1916 – December 26, 2007) was an American United Methodist pastor and Old Testament scholar.

== Biography ==
Born in Dover, Missouri, Anderson earned degrees from the College of the Pacific and Pacific School of Religion. In 1939, he was ordained to the ministry of the (then) Methodist Church. He served Methodist churches in California, and later Congregational churches in both Connecticut and New York.

In 1945 he received the degree of Doctor of Philosophy at Yale, where he specialized in Old Testament studies. He received honorary degrees from the Pacific School of Religion, the University of the Pacific, and Colgate University.

He taught at Colgate University in New York, the University of North Carolina at Chapel Hill, the Colgate Rochester Divinity School, Drew University, (where he served as Dean of the Theological School for nine years), and finally as a Professor of Old Testament Theology at Princeton Theological Seminary, where he was Professor of Old Testament Theology Emeritus. In retirement, he continued to teach into the early 1990s at Boston University School of Theology.

He died on December 26, 2007, in Santa Cruz, California.

== Selected works ==
- Contours of Old Testament Theology (ISBN 0-8006-3074-2)
- Understanding the Old Testament (1957)
- The Unfolding Drama of the Bible (ISBN 0-8006-2098-4)
- Creation Versus Chaos: The Reinterpretation of Mythical Symbolism in the Bible (ISBN 1-59752-042-X)
- From Creation to New Creation (ISBN 1-59752-039-X)
- Creation in the Old Testament (editor) (ISBN 0-8006-1768-1)
- The Eighth Century Prophets: Amos, Hosea, Isaiah, Micah (ISBN 1592443540)
- Out of the Depths: The Psalms Speak for Us Today (ISBN 0-664-25832-8) (Westminster Press, 1970)
- The Living World of the Old Testament (Prentice-Hall, 1957)
- The Place of the Book of Esther in the Christian Bible
- Faith Enacted as History: Essays in Biblical Theology author-Will Herberg (editor-B W Anderson) (Westminster Press, 1976)

== Sources ==
- Obituary of Bernhard W. Anderson in SBL Forum.
