= Page City, Missouri =

Unincorporated community in Missouri, U.S.

Coordinates: 39°07′37″N 93°43′52″W

Page City is an unincorporated community in Lafayette County, in the U.S. state of Missouri.

== History ==
Page City was platted in 1871, and named after Granville R. and Joseph Henry Page, the original owners of the town site. A post office called Page City was established in 1872, and remained in operation until 1901. A tornado struck Page City on November 8, 1879, destroying six of the twelve homes in town as well as a store and the railroad depot. Two people were killed. Missouri Pacific Railroad, commonly known as MoPac, ran through Page City. Page Cemetery contains the memorials of both founders and their families.
