= Shackleford, Missouri =

Unincorporated community in Saline County, Missouri, United States

Coordinates: 39°06′45″N 93°17′49″W

Shackleford is an unincorporated community in Saline County, Missouri, United States.

== History ==
Shackleford was laid out in 1879 when the railroad was extended to that point. A post office called Shackleford was established in 1879, and remained in operation until 1959. The community has the name of Thomas Shackleford, a railroad official.
