= Higginsville, Missouri =

City in Lafayette County, Missouri, United States

- City
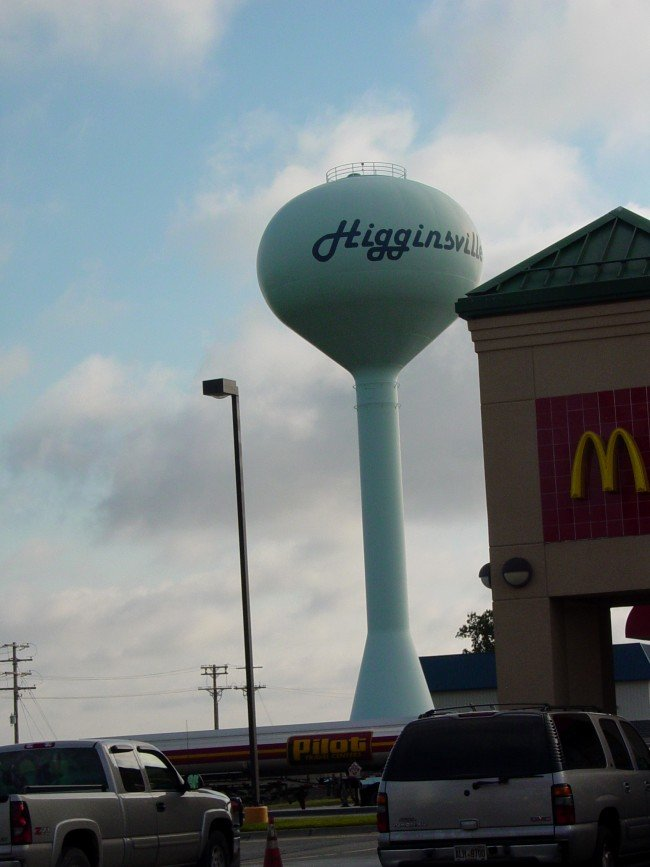
- Higginsville water tower

- Location of Higginsville, Missouri
- Coordinates: 39°03′55″N 93°43′37″W
- Country: United States
- State: Missouri
- County: Lafayette

Government
  - Mayor: Donald Knehans

Area
  - Total: 3.80 sq mi (9.84 km^{2})
  - Land: 3.77 sq mi (9.76 km^{2})
  - Water: 0.031 sq mi (0.08 km^{2})
- Elevation: 860 ft (260 m)

Population (2020)
  - Total: 4,817
  - Density: 1,278/sq mi (493.6/km^{2})
- Time zone: UTC-6 (Central (CST))
  - Summer (DST): UTC-5 (CDT)
- ZIP code: 64037
- Area code: 660
- FIPS code: 29-31960
- GNIS feature ID: 2394373
- Website: www.higginsville.org

Higginsville is a city in Lafayette County, Missouri, United States. The population was 4,817 at the 2020 census.

== History ==
Higginsville was founded in 1869 and named after Harvey Higgins, the original owner of the town site. A post office has been in operation at Higginsville since 1870.

Higginsville was formerly the site of the Missouri Confederate Soldiers' Home. After the last of the Confederate veterans died, the lands were converted into a Confederate Memorial Cemetery. This 135-acre site is preserved in memory of the more than 40,000 Missourians who fought under the Confederate flag. Captain William Clarke Quantrill is one of those interred here.

The Confederate Chapel, Cemetery and Cottage, Houx-Hoefer-Rehkop House, and Chicago and Alton Railroad Depot at Higginsville are listed on the National Register of Historic Places. In World War 1 Bert Hall, a soldier from Higginsville, joined the French Army and became a pilot.

== Demographics ==
Historical population
Census	Pop.	Note	%±
1880	797		—
1890	2,342		193.9%
1900	2,791		19.2%
1910	2,628		−5.8%
1920	2,724		3.7%
1930	3,339		22.6%
1940	3,533		5.8%
1950	3,428		−3.0%
1960	4,003		16.8%
1970	4,318		7.9%
1980	4,595		6.4%
1990	4,693		2.1%
2000	4,682		−0.2%
2010	4,797		2.5%
2020	4,817		0.4%
U.S. Decennial Census

=== 2020 census ===
As of the 2020 census, Higginsville had a population of 4,817. The median age was 40.3 years. 22.4% of residents were under the age of 18 and 20.0% of residents were 65 years of age or older. For every 100 females there were 97.5 males, and for every 100 females age 18 and over there were 93.3 males age 18 and over.

94.4% of residents lived in urban areas, while 5.6% lived in rural areas.

There were 1,872 households in Higginsville, of which 31.0% had children under the age of 18 living in them. Of all households, 41.5% were married-couple households, 21.0% were households with a male householder and no spouse or partner present, and 29.7% were households with a female householder and no spouse or partner present. About 31.3% of all households were made up of individuals and 16.1% had someone living alone who was 65 years of age or older.

There were 2,125 housing units, of which 11.9% were vacant. The homeowner vacancy rate was 1.9% and the rental vacancy rate was 12.8%.

Racial composition as of the 2020 census
Race	Number	Percent
White	4,112	85.4%
Black or African American	275	5.7%
American Indian and Alaska Native	27	0.6%
Asian	19	0.4%
Native Hawaiian and Other Pacific Islander	5	0.1%
Some other race	85	1.8%
Two or more races	294	6.1%
Hispanic or Latino (of any race)	185	3.8%

=== 2010 census ===
As of the census of 2010, there were 4,797 people, 1,961 households, and 1,208 families living in the city. The population density was 1,262.4 inhabitants per square mile (487.4/km^{2}). There were 2,234 housing units at an average density of 587.9 per square mile (227.0/km^{2}). The racial makeup of the city was 91.4% White, 5.3% African American, 0.1% Native American, 0.5% Asian, 0.1% Pacific Islander, 0.8% from other races, and 1.9% from two or more races. Hispanic or Latino of any race were 2.2% of the population.

There were 1,961 households, of which 30.7% had children under the age of 18 living with them, 43.7% were married couples living together, 13.1% had a female householder with no husband present, 4.9% had a male householder with no wife present, and 38.4% were non-families. 33.0% of all households were made up of individuals, and 15.2% had someone living alone who was 65 years of age or older. The average household size was 2.34 and the average family size was 2.93.

The median age in the city was 39.5 years. 23.6% of residents were under the age of 18; 9.2% were between the ages of 18 and 24; 24.4% were from 25 to 44; 24.6% were from 45 to 64; and 18.2% were 65 years of age or older. The gender makeup of the city was 47.6% male and 52.4% female.

=== 2000 census ===
As of the census of 2000, there were 4,682 people, 1,778 households, and 1,175 families living in the city. The population density was 1,270.6 inhabitants per square mile (490.6/km^{2}). There were 1,946 housing units at an average density of 528.1 per square mile (203.9/km^{2}). The racial makeup of the city was 91.56% White, 5.28% African American, 0.43% Native American, 0.53% Asian, 0.68% from other races, and 1.52% from two or more races. Hispanic or Latino of any race were 1.50% of the population.

There were 1,778 households, out of which 33.2% had children under the age of 18 living with them, 49.0% were married couples living together, 12.8% had a female householder with no husband present, and 33.9% were non-families. 29.6% of all households were made up of individuals, and 13.9% had someone living alone who was 65 years of age or older. The average household size was 2.39 and the average family size was 2.94.

In the city the population was spread out, with 24.9% under the age of 18, 8.0% from 18 to 24, 26.4% from 25 to 44, 20.6% from 45 to 64, and 20.2% who were 65 years of age or older. The median age was 39 years. For every 100 females, there were 83.5 males. For every 100 females age 18 and over, there were 80.7 males.

The median income for a household in the city was $31,497, and the median income for a family was $40,511. Males had a median income of $31,291 versus $21,596 for females. The per capita income for the city was $17,982. About 7.1% of families and 8.4% of the population were below the poverty line, including 10.5% of those under age 18 and 9.7% of those age 65 or over.

Ancestries were German 34.8%, Irish 10.7%, English 10.1%, United States 9.2%, French 3.1%, Scotch 2.3%, the census reported.

== Geography ==
Higginsville is located on Missouri Route 13 approximately ten miles southeast of Lexington and 20 miles north of Warrensburg.

According to the United States Census Bureau, the city has a total area of 3.83 square miles (9.92 km^{2}), of which 3.80 square miles (9.84 km^{2}) is land and 0.03 square miles (0.08 km^{2}) is water.

=== Climate ===
Climate data for Higginsville, Missouri, 1991–2020 normals, extremes 1991–present
Month	Jan	Feb	Mar	Apr	May	Jun	Jul	Aug	Sep	Oct	Nov	Dec	Year
Record high °F (°C)	72 (22)	75 (24)	81 (27)	89 (32)	93 (34)	102 (39)	103 (39)	106 (41)	104 (40)	93 (34)	80 (27)	73 (23)	106 (41)
Mean maximum °F (°C)	62.5 (16.9)	65.5 (18.6)	76.1 (24.5)	82.5 (28.1)	87.7 (30.9)	93.4 (34.1)	95.4 (35.2)	96.2 (35.7)	91.7 (33.2)	85.1 (29.5)	72.9 (22.7)	63.5 (17.5)	98.1 (36.7)
Mean daily maximum °F (°C)	36.4 (2.4)	41.6 (5.3)	53.1 (11.7)	63.6 (17.6)	73.6 (23.1)	82.8 (28.2)	86.7 (30.4)	85.5 (29.7)	78.5 (25.8)	66.5 (19.2)	52.3 (11.3)	40.6 (4.8)	63.4 (17.5)
Daily mean °F (°C)	27.4 (−2.6)	32.0 (0.0)	42.8 (6.0)	53.3 (11.8)	64.1 (17.8)	73.3 (22.9)	77.1 (25.1)	75.4 (24.1)	67.5 (19.7)	55.5 (13.1)	42.7 (5.9)	32.0 (0.0)	53.6 (12.0)
Mean daily minimum °F (°C)	18.4 (−7.6)	22.5 (−5.3)	32.5 (0.3)	43.1 (6.2)	54.5 (12.5)	63.9 (17.7)	67.6 (19.8)	65.3 (18.5)	56.5 (13.6)	44.5 (6.9)	33.2 (0.7)	23.4 (−4.8)	43.8 (6.5)
Mean minimum °F (°C)	−1.5 (−18.6)	1.9 (−16.7)	14.1 (−9.9)	28.5 (−1.9)	40.9 (4.9)	53.5 (11.9)	59.3 (15.2)	55.1 (12.8)	43.5 (6.4)	28.5 (−1.9)	16.4 (−8.7)	5.3 (−14.8)	−4.8 (−20.4)
Record low °F (°C)	−13 (−25)	−13 (−25)	−7 (−22)	17 (−8)	31 (−1)	45 (7)	52 (11)	49 (9)	32 (0)	21 (−6)	−2 (−19)	−9 (−23)	−13 (−25)
Average precipitation inches (mm)	1.37 (35)	1.77 (45)	2.84 (72)	4.24 (108)	5.30 (135)	4.88 (124)	5.04 (128)	3.94 (100)	4.04 (103)	3.16 (80)	2.46 (62)	1.83 (46)	40.87 (1,038)
Average snowfall inches (cm)	4.8 (12)	3.1 (7.9)	1.4 (3.6)	0.2 (0.51)	0.0 (0.0)	0.0 (0.0)	0.0 (0.0)	0.0 (0.0)	0.0 (0.0)	0.2 (0.51)	1.0 (2.5)	3.0 (7.6)	13.7 (34.62)
Average precipitation days (≥ 0.01 in)	7.3	6.9	10.0	10.9	12.0	10.1	9.2	9.1	8.3	9.1	7.2	7.5	107.6
Average snowy days (≥ 0.1 in)	2.8	1.9	0.9	0.2	0.0	0.0	0.0	0.0	0.0	0.2	0.4	2.1	8.5
Source 1: NOAA
Source 2: National Weather Service (mean maxima/minima 2006–2020)

== Education ==
Public education in Higginsville is administered by Lafayette County C-1 School District,. which operates one elementary school, one middle school and Lafayette County High School.

Immanuel Lutheran School is a private institution.

Higginsville has a public library, the Robertson Memorial Library.

Metropolitan Community College has the C-1 school district area in its service area, but not its in-district taxation area.

== Newspapers ==
Higginsville has hosted several local newspaper publications throughout its history, the first dating back to 1871:

- The Higginsville Advance:Established in 1908, it serves as the primary and current weekly newspaper for Higginsville.
- The Higginsville Jeffersonian: A local weekly paper published from the late 1890s to 1945.
- Missouri Thalbote: A German-language newspaper established in 1871. The paper shifted its place of publication between Lexington, Concordia, and Higginsville. The paper moved printing operations to Higginsville in 1893 to serve the area's German-American immigrant population until 1918.
- The Higginsville Mirror: A weekly paper established in 1899.
- The Higginsville Democrat: An early paper operating from 1888 to 1890.

== Notable people ==
- Brian Brown, racing driver
- William J. Cason, lawyer and politician
- Jon Garrison, opera singer
- John Clark Salyer II, "Father of the National Wildlife Refuge System", principal architect for President Franklin D. Roosevelt's duck restoration program of 1934–36. J. Clark Salyer National Wildlife Refuge
- George Seals, professional football player
- Lee Shippey, journalist
- Alonzo "Skip" Thomas, football player

== See also ==
- List of cities in Missouri
