= Confederate Memorial State Historic Site =

Historic site in Higginsville, Missouri, United States

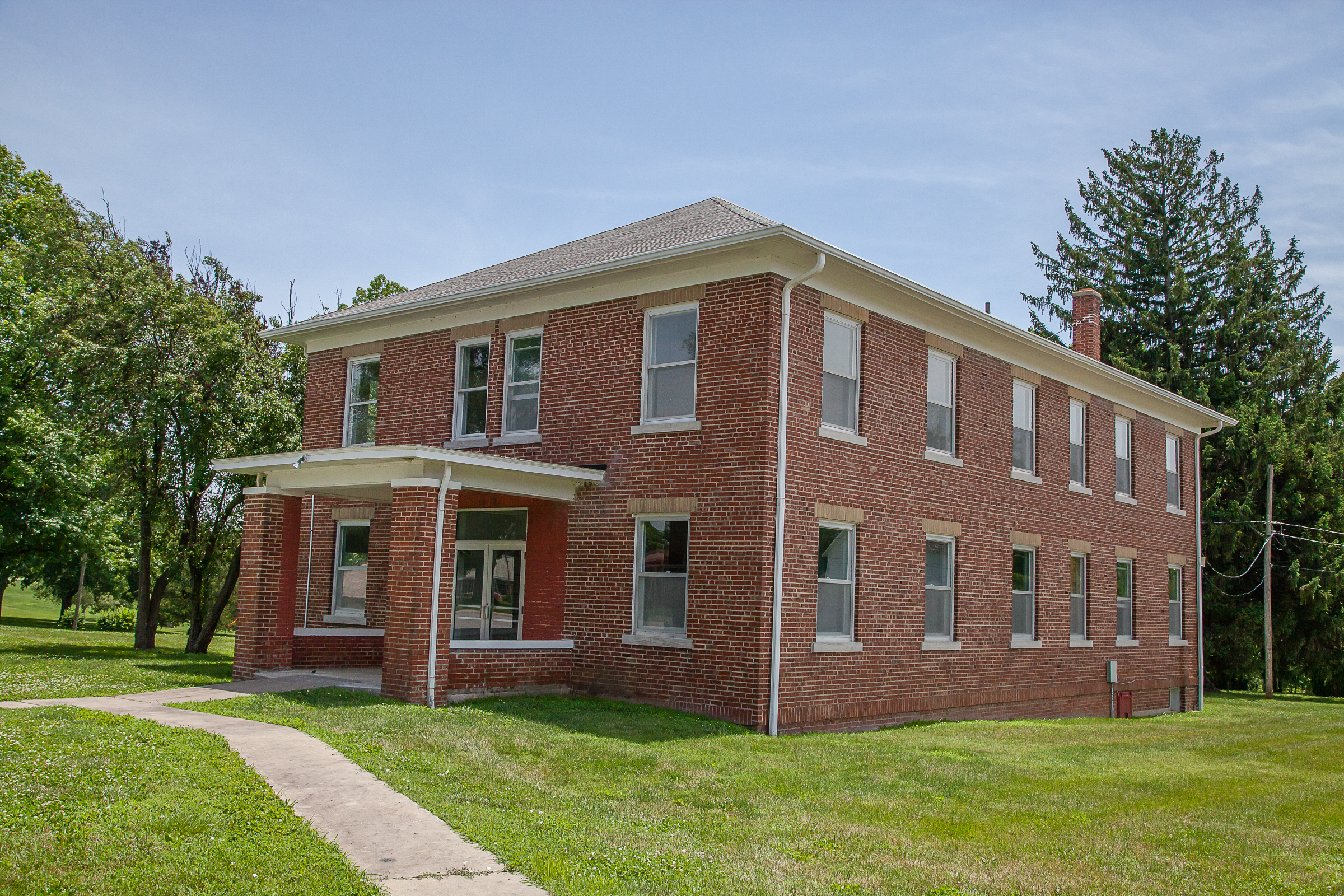
- Former hospital building

- Location within Missouri Location within the United States
- Nearest city: Higginsville, Missouri
- Coordinates: 39°5′54″N 93°43′45″W
- Area: 135.22 acres (54.72 ha)
- Established: 1952
- Visitors: 151,026 (in 2020)
- Governing body: Missouri Department of Natural Resources
- Website: Confederate Memorial State Historic Site
- Confederate Chapel, Cemetery and Cottage
- U.S. National Register of Historic Places
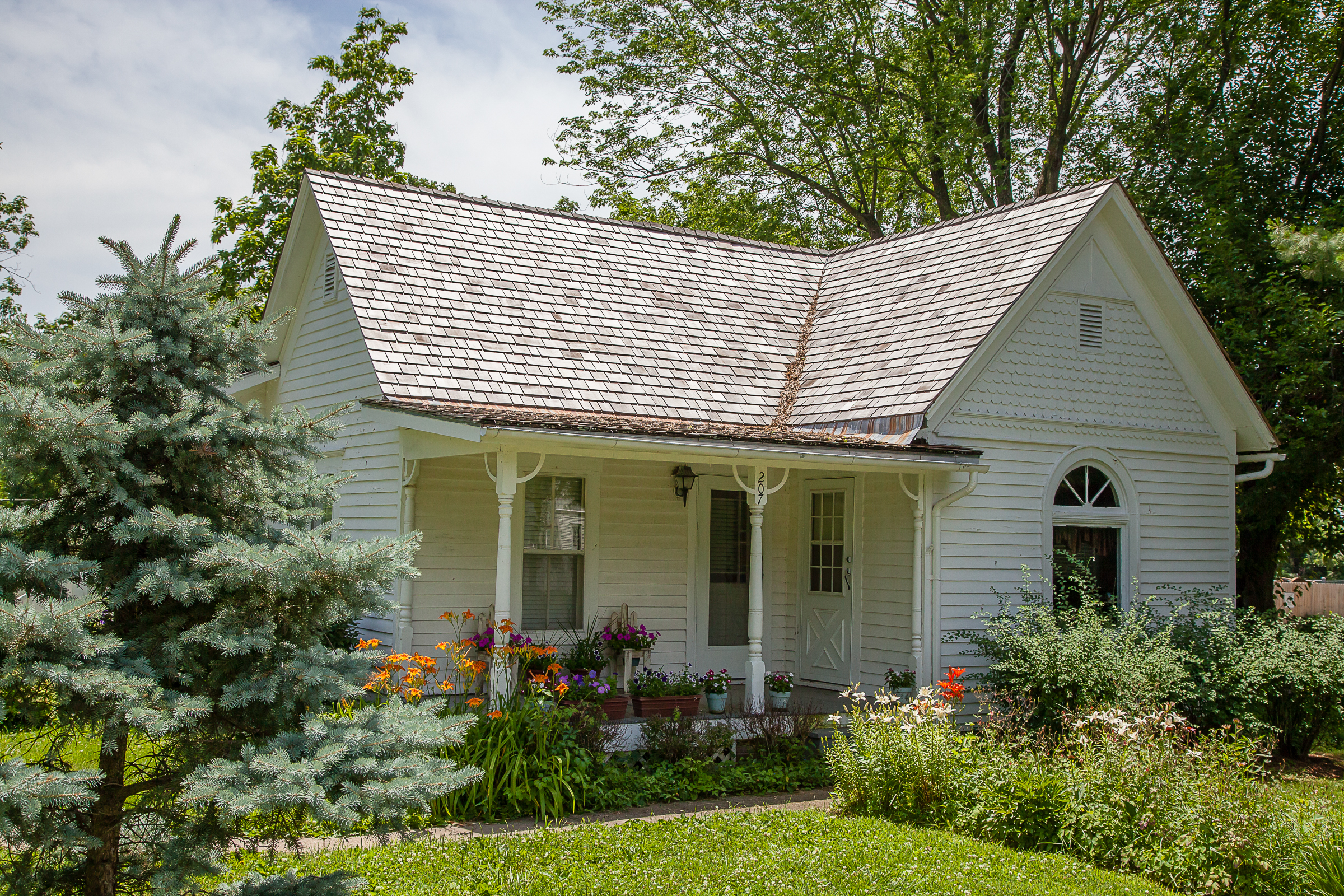
- View of the cottage
- Nearest city: Higginsville, Missouri
- Area: 5.6 acres (2.3 ha)
- NRHP reference No.: 81000335
- Added to NRHP: December 16, 1981

The Confederate Memorial State Historic Site is a state-owned property occupying approximately 135 acres (55 ha) in northern Higginsville, Missouri, United States. From 1891 to 1950, the site was used as an old soldiers' home for veterans of the Confederate States Army after the American Civil War. The Missouri state government then took over operation of the site after the last veteran died in 1950, using it as a state park. In 1981, a cottage, a chapel, and the Confederate cemetery were listed on the National Register of Historic Places as the Confederate Chapel, Cemetery and Cottage. The chapel was moved from its original position in 1913, but was returned in 1978. It has a tower and a stained glass window. The cottage is a small wooden building, and the cemetery contains 723 graves. Within the cemetery is a monument erected by the United Daughters of the Confederacy which is modeled on the Lion of Lucerne. In addition to the cemetery and historic structures, the grounds also contain trails, picnic sites, and fishing ponds.

== History ==
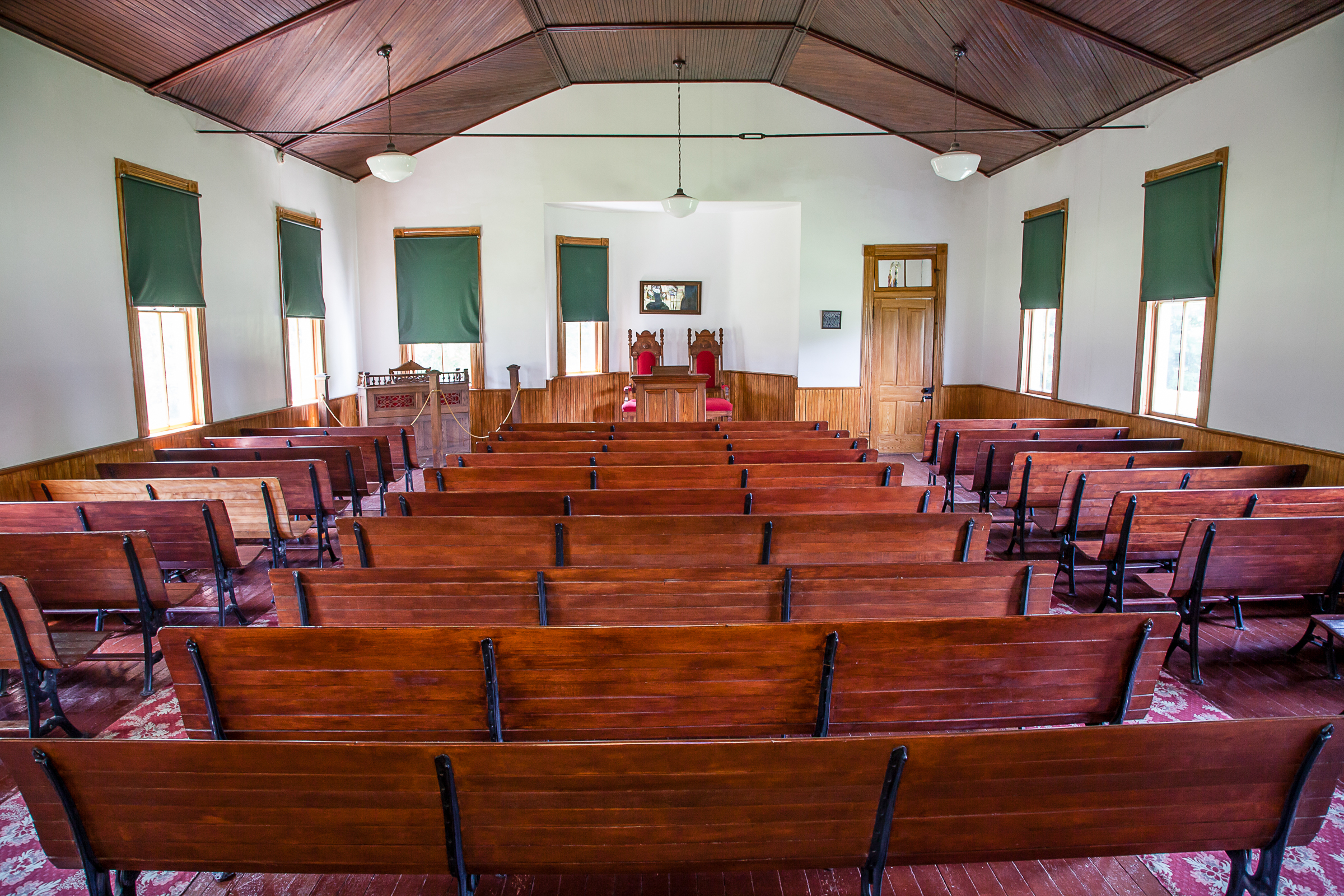
Interior of the chapel

After the end of the American Civil War in Missouri, veterans of the Confederate States Army faced hard times. Confederate veterans, some of whom had difficulty accessing medical treatment and who had been disenfranchised from voting, met throughout the state periodically after the war. At one such meeting in Higginsville in 1889, the idea of creating an old soldiers' home to care for aging Confederate veterans was discussed. In 1891, 365 acres (148 ha) in the Higginsville vicinity were purchased to establish the old soldier's home. The families of Confederate veterans were also allowed to live at the site. By 1897, the group operating the site was running out of funds, and the state government stepped in to help run the site. While the state funded the site, the home's board of trustees was still composed of Confederate veterans. Facilities for producing electricity existed at the site, and about 30 buildings were located on the grounds at its peak.

Over the course of the site's use as an old soldiers' home, about 1,600 people from all but one state of the former Confederacy resided at the site. A chapel located on the park grounds was moved in 1913, as the aging veterans were having difficulty walking to the chapel for religious services; the chapel's basement was also used for the production of hard cider. In 1925, Missouri designated 92 acres (37 ha) of the home as a memorial to Confederate soldiers. It remained in operation until 1950, when the last Confederate veteran in the state died, after which the state government purchased the site to operate as a state park.

The state's land acquisition process was completed in 1952. In 1954, most of the remaining buildings in the park were torn down. Beginning in 1956, parts of the site were also used for storage by a local school, and the chapel was technically under the administration of the Missouri Department of Mental Health until 1977. On December 16, 1981, the park was listed on the National Register of Historic Places as "Confederate Chapel, Cemetery and Cottage", with a register number of 81000335. At the time of the register listing, the chapel was assessed to be in good condition, while the cottage was given a lower condition rating of fair. The cottage was still located in its original site, while the chapel had been moved twice: once in 1913 and once in 1978 when it was returned to its original site after a concrete basement had been built there. In the 2000s, a Confederate flag officially flown at the site was removed when the state government declared that only the United States flag and the flag of Missouri could be flown at state parks; the Confederate flag was displayed, not flown, while the site was used as an old soldiers' home. While many Confederate monuments and memorials have been removed in recent years, there has been very little pressure to remove or rename the site. The journalist Seth Boester, writing for the Columbia Missourian, has speculated that this is because the site's historic usage as a retirement home makes it less controversial.

== Features ==
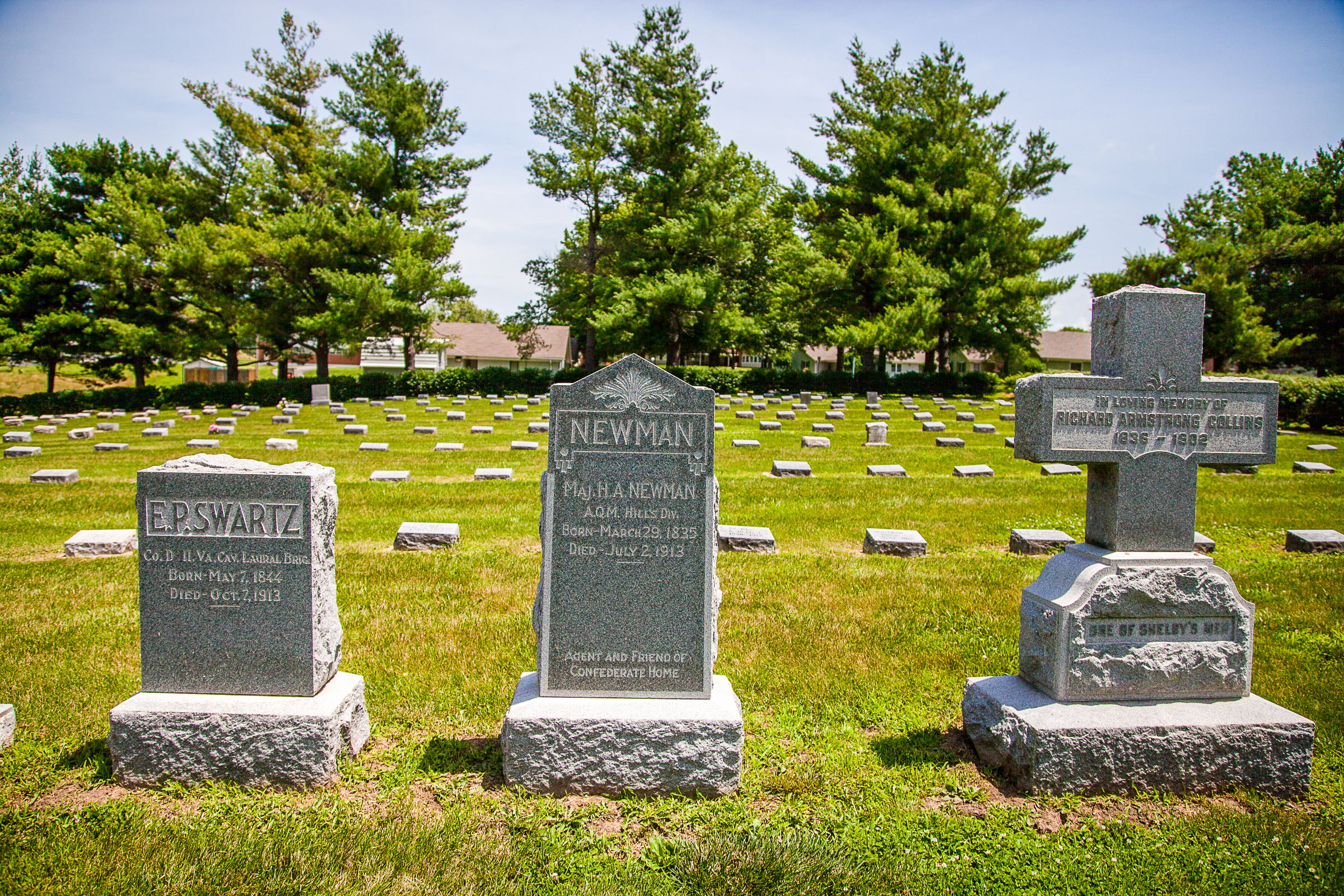
Graves in the Confederate cemetery

The Missouri Department of Natural Resources maintains 135.22 acres (54.72 ha) of land at the site. The site saw a total of 151,026 visitors in 2020. On the park grounds are 10 buildings and 2.32 miles (3.73 km) of roadways; most of the buildings are located in the northwestern portion of the park. Visitors are allowed to tour the historic chapel, the park cemetery, and three other buildings. Picnic sites, walking trails, and ponds for recreational fishing are also present on the grounds. Only 5.6 acres (2.3 ha) of the park are part of the National Register of Historic Places listing. The park's chapel is not evenly shaped, as one side is 44 feet (13 m) long, the side opposite is 52 feet (16 m) long, and the other two sides are 34 feet (10 m) long. The building is decorated with a tower and a stained glass window and is sided with weatherboard. Weddings can be held within the chapel. The Confederate cemetery at the park contains 723 graves, some of which are double. Most of the headstones marking the graves are simple, although a few ornate exceptions exist. A monument modeled after the Lion of Lucerne is located within the cemetery; it was erected by the United Daughters of the Confederacy in 1906 and bears the inscription "In Memoriam OUR CONFEDERATE DEAD". A plaque on the monument pictures Robert E. Lee, and a religious inscription is engraved below the lion. The cottage is a wood building on a brick foundation; it is roofed with shingles and is generally rectangularly shaped.

== See also ==
- List of cemeteries in Missouri
