= Blackburn, Missouri =

City in Saline and Lafayatte counties in Missouri, United States

- City
- Location of Blackburn, Missouri
- Coordinates: 39°06′17″N 93°29′08″W
- Country: United States
- State: Missouri
- Counties: Saline, Lafayette

Area
  - Total: 0.32 sq mi (0.83 km^{2})
  - Land: 0.31 sq mi (0.80 km^{2})
  - Water: 0.012 sq mi (0.03 km^{2})
- Elevation: 787 ft (240 m)

Population (2020)
  - Total: 224
  - Density: 725.2/sq mi (279.99/km^{2})
- Time zone: UTC-6 (Central (CST))
  - Summer (DST): UTC-5 (CDT)
- ZIP code: 65321
- Area code: 660
- FIPS code: 29-05950
- GNIS feature ID: 2394180

Blackburn is a city in Lafayette and Saline counties in Missouri, United States. It is part of the Kansas City metropolitan area. The population was 224 at the 2020 census.

== History ==
Blackburn was platted in 1880 when the railroad was extended through the neighborhood. A post office called Blackburn has been in operation since 1878. The community shares a name with a town in Lancashire England and has the name of Francis Blackburn, a first settler.

== Geography ==
According to the United States Census Bureau, the city has a total area of 0.32 square miles (0.83 km^{2}), of which 0.31 square miles (0.80 km^{2}) is land and 0.01 square miles (0.03 km^{2}) is water.

== Demographics ==
Historical population
Census	Pop.	Note	%±
1880	214		—
1890	372		73.8%
1900	458		23.1%
1910	389		−15.1%
1920	333		−14.4%
1930	292		−12.3%
1940	314		7.5%
1950	306		−2.5%
1960	310		1.3%
1970	294		−5.2%
1980	314		6.8%
1990	308		−1.9%
2000	284		−7.8%
2010	249		−12.3%
2020	224		−10.0%
U.S. Decennial Census

=== 2010 census ===
As of the census of 2010, there were 249 people, 107 households, and 72 families living in the city. The population density was 803.2 inhabitants per square mile (310.1/km^{2}). There were 124 housing units at an average density of 400.0 per square mile (154.4/km^{2}). The racial makeup of the city was 92.0% White, 3.2% African American, 1.2% from other races, and 3.6% from two or more races. Hispanic or Latino of any race were 2.8% of the population.

There were 107 households, of which 29.9% had children under the age of 18 living with them, 57.0% were married couples living together, 7.5% had a female householder with no husband present, 2.8% had a male householder with no wife present, and 32.7% were non-families. 28.0% of all households were made up of individuals, and 8.4% had someone living alone who was 65 years of age or older. The average household size was 2.33 and the average family size was 2.82.

The median age in the city was 44.8 years. 22.9% of residents were under the age of 18; 4.3% were between the ages of 18 and 24; 22.8% were from 25 to 44; 30% were from 45 to 64; and 19.7% were 65 years of age or older. The gender makeup of the city was 48.2% male and 51.8% female.

=== 2000 census ===
As of the census of 2000, there were 284 people, 106 households, and 76 families living in the city. The population density was 923.4 inhabitants per square mile (356.5/km^{2}). There were 126 housing units at an average density of 409.7 per square mile (158.2/km^{2}). The racial makeup of the city was 95.77% White, 1.76% African American, 0.35% Native American, 0.35% Asian, and 1.76% from two or more races. Hispanic or Latino of any race were 2.11% of the population.

There were 106 households, out of which 34.0% had children under the age of 18 living with them, 62.3% were married couples living together, 4.7% had a female householder with no husband present, and 28.3% were non-families. 24.5% of all households were made up of individuals, and 14.2% had someone living alone who was 65 years of age or older. The average household size was 2.68 and the average family size was 3.24.

In the city the population was spread out, with 27.1% under the age of 18, 7.4% from 18 to 24, 26.8% from 25 to 44, 24.6% from 45 to 64, and 14.1% who were 65 years of age or older. The median age was 38 years. For every 100 females, there were 100.0 males. For every 100 females age 18 and over, there were 93.5 males.

The median income for a household in the city was $35,313, and the median income for a family was $43,750. Males had a median income of $38,333 versus $21,250 for females. The per capita income for the city was $14,603. About 10.6% of families and 11.8% of the population were below the poverty line, including 7.5% of those under the age of eighteen and 7.9% of those 65 or over.

== Education ==
It is in the Santa Fe R-X School District.

Metropolitan Community College has the Santa Fe school district area in its service area, but not its in-district taxation area.

== See also ==
- List of cities in Missouri
