= Corder, Missouri =

- City
- Location of Corder, Missouri
- Coordinates: 39°5′57″N 93°38′20″W
- Country: United States
- State: Missouri
- County: Lafayette

Area
  - Total: 0.36 sq mi (0.92 km^{2})
  - Land: 0.36 sq mi (0.92 km^{2})
  - Water: 0 sq mi (0.00 km^{2})
- Elevation: 869 ft (265 m)

Population (2020)
  - Total: 418
  - Density: 1,174.5/sq mi (453.49/km^{2})
- Time zone: UTC-6 (Central (CST))
  - Summer (DST): UTC-5 (CDT)
- ZIP code: 64021
- Area code: 660
- FIPS code: 29-16408
- GNIS feature ID: 2393635

Corder is a city in Lafayette County, Missouri, and is part of the Kansas City metropolitan area within the United States. The population was 418 at the 2020 census.

== History ==
A post office called Corder has been in operation since 1879. The community was named for a son (George W. Corder) of Nathan Corder who was the original owner of the site.

== Geography ==
According to the United States Census Bureau, the city has a total area of 0.36 square miles (0.93 km^{2}), all land.

== Demographics ==
Historical population
Census	Pop.	Note	%±
1890	1,145		—
1900	538		−53.0%
1910	649		20.6%
1920	768		18.3%
1930	610		−20.6%
1940	630		3.3%
1950	541		−14.1%
1960	506		−6.5%
1970	476		−5.9%
1980	483		1.5%
1990	485		0.4%
2000	427		−12.0%
2010	404		−5.4%
2020	418		3.5%
U.S. Decennial Census

=== 2010 census ===
As of the census of 2010, there were 404 people, 171 households, and 116 families residing in the city. The population density was 1,122.2 inhabitants per square mile (433.3/km^{2}). There were 194 housing units at an average density of 538.9 per square mile (208.1/km^{2}). The racial makeup of the city was 94.6% White, 1.0% African American, 0.7% Native American, 0.2% Asian, 1.0% from other races, and 2.5% from two or more races. Hispanic or Latino of any race were 1.5% of the population.

There were 171 households, of which 29.8% had children under the age of 18 living with them, 53.8% were married couples living together, 6.4% had a female householder with no husband present, 7.6% had a male householder with no wife present, and 32.2% were non-families. 28.1% of all households were made up of individuals, and 14.1% had someone living alone who was 65 years of age or older. The average household size was 2.36 and the average family size was 2.85.

The median age in the city was 43.2 years. 24% of residents were under the age of 18; 6.9% were between the ages of 18 and 24; 21.2% were from 25 to 44; 29.9% were from 45 to 64; and 17.8% were 65 years of age or older. The gender makeup of the city was 50.5% male and 49.5% female.

=== 2000 census ===
As of the census of 2000, there were 427 people, 180 households, and 126 families residing in the city. The population density was 1,215.1 inhabitants per square mile (469.2/km^{2}). There were 203 housing units at an average density of 577.7 per square mile (223.1/km^{2}). The racial makeup of the city was 97.19% White, 0.47% African American, 0.94% Native American, 0.47% from other races, and 0.94% from two or more races. Hispanic or Latino of any race were 0.70% of the population.

There were 180 households, out of which 33.3% had children under the age of 18 living with them, 56.1% were married couples living together, 8.9% had a female householder with no husband present, and 30.0% were non-families. 25.6% of all households were made up of individuals, and 11.7% had someone living alone who was 65 years of age or older. The average household size was 2.37 and the average family size was 2.83.

In the city the population was spread out, with 23.9% under the age of 18, 8.4% from 18 to 24, 28.6% from 25 to 44, 23.7% from 45 to 64, and 15.5% who were 65 years of age or older. The median age was 40 years. For every 100 females, there were 110.3 males. For every 100 females age 18 and over, there were 104.4 males.

The median income for a household in the city was $32,727, and the median income for a family was $34,886. Males had a median income of $30,357 versus $21,500 for females. The per capita income for the city was $17,897. About 5.6% of families and 10.7% of the population were below the poverty line, including 18.6% of those under age 18 and none of those age 65 or over.

== Education ==
It is in the Lafayette County C-1 School District.

Corder has a public library, a branch of the Trails Regional Library.

Metropolitan Community College has the C-1 school district area in its service area, but not its in-district taxation area.
