= Dover, Missouri =

Town in Lafayette County, Missouri, United States

- Town
- Location of Dover, Missouri
- Coordinates: 39°11′39″N 93°41′22″W
- Country: United States
- State: Missouri
- County: Lafayette

Area
  - Total: 0.20 sq mi (0.52 km^{2})
  - Land: 0.20 sq mi (0.52 km^{2})
  - Water: 0 sq mi (0.00 km^{2})
- Elevation: 807 ft (246 m)

Population (2020)
  - Total: 83
  - Density: 413.2/sq mi (159.54/km^{2})
- Time zone: UTC-6 (Central (CST))
  - Summer (DST): UTC-5 (CDT)
- ZIP code: 64022
- Area code: 660
- FIPS code: 29-19918
- GNIS feature ID: 2396688

Dover is a town in Lafayette County, Missouri, United States, and is part of the Kansas City metropolitan area. The population was 83 at the 2020 census.

== History ==
Dover was platted in 1839. The community took its name from a nearby church of the same name. A post office called Dover has been in operation since 1835.

The James M. Dinwiddie House was listed on the National Register of Historic Places in 1997.

== Geography ==
According to the United States Census Bureau, the village has a total area of 0.19 square miles (0.49 km^{2}), all land.

== Demographics ==
Historical population
Census	Pop.	Note	%±
1870	320		—
1880	321		0.3%
1900	242		—
1910	214		−11.6%
1920	229		7.0%
1930	252		10.0%
1940	233		−7.5%
1950	173		−25.8%
1960	172		−0.6%
1970	133		−22.7%
1980	126		−5.3%
1990	115		−8.7%
2000	108		−6.1%
2010	103		−4.6%
2020	83		−19.4%
U.S. Decennial Census

=== 2010 census ===
As of the census of 2010, there were 103 people, 46 households, and 32 families living in the village. The population density was 542.1 inhabitants per square mile (209.3/km^{2}). There were 58 housing units at an average density of 305.3 per square mile (117.9/km^{2}). The racial makeup of the village was 90.3% White, 4.9% African American, 1.0% Asian, and 3.9% from other races. Hispanic or Latino of any race were 3.9% of the population.

There were 46 households, of which 26.1% had children under the age of 18 living with them, 54.3% were married couples living together, 6.5% had a female householder with no husband present, 8.7% had a male householder with no wife present, and 30.4% were non-families. 26.1% of all households were made up of individuals, and 8.7% had someone living alone who was 65 years of age or older. The average household size was 2.24 and the average family size was 2.69.

The median age in the village was 46.8 years. 16.5% of residents were under the age of 18; 9.8% were between the ages of 18 and 24; 19.4% were from 25 to 44; 33% were from 45 to 64; and 21.4% were 65 years of age or older. The gender makeup of the village was 54.4% male and 45.6% female.

=== 2000 census ===
As of the census of 2000, there were 108 people, 48 households, and 27 families living in the town. The population density was 562.4 inhabitants per square mile (217.1/km^{2}). There were 64 housing units at an average density of 333.3 per square mile (128.7/km^{2}). The racial makeup of the town was 91.67% White, 0.93% African American, 0.93% Asian, 4.63% from other races, and 1.85% from two or more races. Hispanic or Latino of any race were 4.63% of the population.

There were 48 households, out of which 25.0% had children under the age of 18 living with them, 47.9% were married couples living together, 6.3% had a female householder with no husband present, and 43.8% were non-families. 39.6% of all households were made up of individuals, and 22.9% had someone living alone who was 65 years of age or older. The average household size was 2.25 and the average family size was 3.07.

In the town the population was spread out, with 21.3% under the age of 18, 5.6% from 18 to 24, 25.9% from 25 to 44, 30.6% from 45 to 64, and 16.7% who were 65 years of age or older. The median age was 44 years. For every 100 females, there were 92.9 males. For every 100 females age 18 and over, there were 88.9 males.

The median income for a household in the town was $39,688, and the median income for a family was $50,313. Males had a median income of $27,813 versus $22,083 for females. The per capita income for the town was $40,768. None of the population and none of the families were below the poverty line.

== Education ==
It is in the Lexington R-V School District.

Metropolitan Community College has the Lexington school district area in its service area, but not its in-district taxation area.

== Notable people ==
- Bernhard Anderson - Old Testament scholar.
- Danny Lasoski - Race car driver
