= Alma, Missouri =

- City
- Location of Alma, Missouri
- Coordinates: 39°5′47″N 93°32′52″W
- Country: United States
- State: Missouri
- County: Lafayette
- Incorporated: 1878

Area
  - Total: 0.27 sq mi (0.71 km^{2})
  - Land: 0.27 sq mi (0.71 km^{2})
  - Water: 0 sq mi (0.00 km^{2})
- Elevation: 801 ft (244 m)

Population (2020)
  - Total: 400
  - Density: 1,454.0/sq mi (561.38/km^{2})
- Time zone: UTC-6 (Central (CST))
  - Summer (DST): UTC-5 (CDT)
- ZIP code: 64001
- Area code: 660
- FIPS code: 29-00802
- GNIS feature ID: 2393925

Alma is a city in Lafayette County, Missouri, and is part of the Kansas City metropolitan area within the United States. The population was 400 at the 2020 census.

== History ==
Alma was laid out in 1879 when the railroad was extended to that point. A post office called Alma has been in operation since 1879. The community has the name of Alma Woodson, the daughter of one of the founders.

== Geography ==
According to the United States Census Bureau, the city has a total area of 0.28 square miles (0.73 km^{2}), all land.

== Demographics ==
Historical population
Census	Pop.	Note	%±
1880	53		—
1890	179		237.7%
1900	248		38.5%
1910	319		28.6%
1920	369		15.7%
1930	361		−2.2%
1940	366		1.4%
1950	357		−2.5%
1960	390		9.2%
1970	380		−2.6%
1980	445		17.1%
1990	446		0.2%
2000	399		−10.5%
2010	402		0.8%
2020	400		−0.5%
U.S. Decennial Census

=== 2010 census ===
As of the census of 2010, there were 402 people, 173 households, and 116 families living in the city. The population density was 1,435.7 inhabitants per square mile (554.3/km^{2}). There were 193 housing units at an average density of 689.3 per square mile (266.1/km^{2}). The racial makeup of the city was 97.3% White, 0.5% African American, 0.2% Asian, 0.2% from other races, and 1.7% from two or more races. Hispanic or Latino of any race were 0.5% of the population.

There were 173 households, of which 30.1% had children under the age of 18 living with them, 55.5% were married couples living together, 7.5% had a female householder with no husband present, 4.0% had a male householder with no wife present, and 32.9% were non-families. 30.6% of all households were made up of individuals, and 16.2% had someone living alone who was 65 years of age or older. The average household size was 2.32 and the average family size was 2.90.

The median age in the city was 44 years. 24.9% of residents were under the age of 18; 5.2% were between the ages of 18 and 24; 21.9% were from 25 to 44; 24.1% were from 45 to 64; and 23.9% were 65 years of age or older. The gender makeup of the city was 46.8% male and 53.2% female.

=== 2000 census ===
As of the census of 2000, there were 399 people, 179 households, and 117 families living in the city. The population density was 1,476.7 inhabitants per square mile (570.2/km^{2}). There were 190 housing units at an average density of 703.2 per square mile (271.5/km^{2}). The racial makeup of the city was 99.50% White, and 0.50% from two or more races.

There were 179 households, out of which 25.1% had children under the age of 18 living with them, 57.5% were married couples living together, 5.6% had a female householder with no husband present, and 34.6% were non-families. 32.4% of all households were made up of individuals, and 24.6% had someone living alone who was 65 years of age or older. The average household size was 2.23 and the average family size was 2.83.

In the city the population was spread out, with 19.8% under the age of 18, 6.8% from 18 to 24, 24.3% from 25 to 44, 24.8% from 45 to 64, and 24.3% who were 65 years of age or older. The median age was 44 years. For every 100 females, there were 80.5 males. For every 100 females age 18 and over, there were 74.9 males.

The median income for a household in the city was $37,426, and the median income for a family was $49,375. Males had a median income of $28,942 versus $21,607 for females. The per capita income for the city was $24,000. About 0.9% of families and 4.1% of the population were below the poverty line, including 3.4% of those under age 18 and 13.5% of those age 65 or over.

== Education ==
It is in the Santa Fe R-X School District. Alma is home to Santa Fe High School. The school mascot is the Chiefs. In 2000, the Chiefs football team defeated St. Vincent 12–0 to win the Missouri Class 1A state football title. In May 2008 and again in 2012, the Chiefs took first in Missouri Class 1A State baseball title, after coming in fourth in baseball the year before.

Trinity Lutheran School is an accredited Lutheran LCMS Elementary School and is associated with Trinity Lutheran Church. Upon graduation, most students go on to Santa Fe High School, while some go on to either St Paul Lutheran High in Concordia or other local public high schools. Athletically, Trinity's mascot is a Tiger.

Metropolitan Community College has the Santa Fe school district area in its service area, but not its in-district taxation area.
