= Lafayette County, Missouri =

County in Missouri, United States

- County
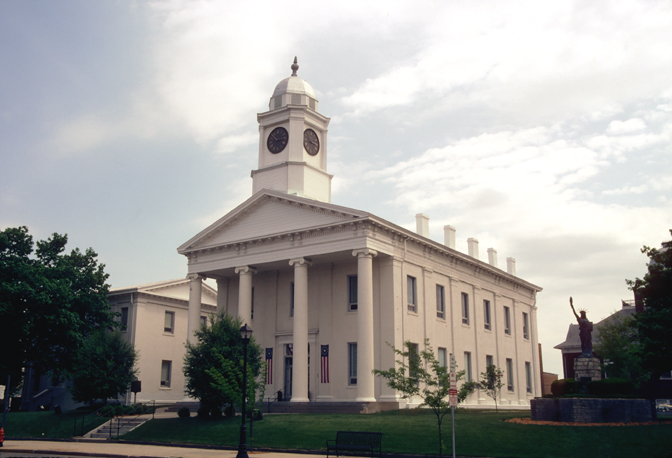
- Lafayette County Courthouse in Lexington

- Location within the U.S. state of Missouri
- Coordinates: 39°04′N 93°47′W
- Country: United States
- State: Missouri
- Founded: November 16, 1820
- Named for: Marquis de La Fayette
- Seat: Lexington
- Largest city: Odessa

Area
  - Total: 639 sq mi (1,660 km^{2})
  - Land: 628 sq mi (1,630 km^{2})
  - Water: 11 sq mi (28 km^{2}) 1.6%

Population (2020)
  - Total: 32,984
  - Estimate (2025): 33,531 ▲
  - Density: 52.5/sq mi (20.3/km^{2})
- Time zone: UTC−6 (Central)
  - Summer (DST): UTC−5 (CDT)
- Congressional district: 4th
- Website: www.lafayettecountymo.gov

Lafayette County (/ˌlæfiˈjɛt/ LAF-ee-YET) is a county in the western portion of Missouri, part of the Kansas City metropolitan area. As of the 2020 census, the population was 32,984. Its county seat is Lexington. The county was organized November 16, 1820, from Cooper County and originally named Lillard County for James Lillard of Tennessee, who served in the first state constitutional convention and first state legislature. It was renamed Lafayette County on February 16, 1825, in honor of Revolutionary War hero the Marquis de La Fayette, who was then visiting the United States.

== History ==
Lafayette County was settled primarily from migrants from the Upper Southern states of Kentucky, Tennessee and Virginia. They brought enslaved people and slaveholding traditions and started cultivating crops similar to those in Middle Tennessee and Kentucky: hemp and tobacco.

Peter Youree (1843-1914) was born here to merchant P. E. Youree and the former M. M. Zimmerman. As a young man, he enlisted in the Confederate forces from here, and gained the rank of captain during the American Civil War. Afterward, he settled in Shreveport, Louisiana, where he married, became a successful merchant and banker, and served on the Caddo Parish Police Jury.

As a result of the migration from the South, this part of Missouri, and neighboring counties, became known as Little Dixie. In 1860 enslaved people made up 25 percent or more of the county's population, and the county was strongly pro-Confederate during the American Civil War.

But immigrants from Germany, as well as German Americans from St. Louis, began arriving shortly before the war, with many more to come afterwards. Many of the Germans were sympathetic to the Union and opposed slavery. They eventually made up a large part of the populations of Concordia, Emma, Wellington, Napoleon, Higginsville, Mayview, and Lexington.

After the war, there were racial tensions as whites worked to dominate the freedmen. Following Reconstruction, whites lynched two blacks in the decades around the turn of the century.

Sunday May 4, 1919, Lafayette County Sheriff Joseph C. Talbott was killed while transporting car thieves to jail. Also killed were Deputy Sheriff John McDonald and Deputy Constable James Stapleton. On May 29, 1919, Lafayette County held a special election to replace Sheriff Talbott. Sheriff Talbott's wife, Minnie Mae Talbott, won the special election becoming the first woman elected to the office of Sheriff in the United States. Minnie Mae Talbott was sworn into office on June 8, 1919. Minnie Mae Talbott was elected by an all-male electorate. Women would not gain the right to vote until August 1920, with ratification of the 19th Amendment to the U.S. Constitution.

=== 21st century ===
In November 2013, Leland Ray Kolkmeyer pleaded guilty, in federal court, of a fraud scheme in which he embezzled more than $1.5 million from Wellington-Napoleon Fire Protection District and Special Road District while serving as their treasurer.

== Geography ==
According to the U.S. Census Bureau, the county has a total area of 639 square miles (1,660 km^{2}), of which 628 square miles (1,630 km^{2}) is land and 11 square miles (28 km^{2}) (1.6%) is water.

=== Adjacent counties ===
- Ray County (northwest)
- Carroll County (northeast)
- Saline County (east)
- Johnson County (south)
- Jackson County (west)
- Pettis County (southeast)

=== Major highways ===
- Interstate 70
- U.S. Route 24
- U.S. Route 40
- U.S. Route 65
- Route 13
- Route 20
- Route 23
- Route 131
- Route 213
- Route 224

=== National protected area ===
- Big Muddy National Fish and Wildlife Refuge (part)

== Demographics ==
Historical population
Census	Pop.	Note	%±
1830	2,912		—
1840	6,815		134.0%
1850	13,690		100.9%
1860	20,098		46.8%
1870	22,623		12.6%
1880	25,710		13.6%
1890	30,184		17.4%
1900	31,679		5.0%
1910	30,154		−4.8%
1920	30,006		−0.5%
1930	29,259		−2.5%
1940	27,856		−4.8%
1950	25,272		−9.3%
1960	25,274		0.0%
1970	26,626		5.3%
1980	29,925		12.4%
1990	31,107		3.9%
2000	32,960		6.0%
2010	33,381		1.3%
2020	32,984		−1.2%
2025 (est.)	33,531	▲	1.7%
U.S. Decennial Census; 1790-1960 1900-1990; 1990-2000 2010

=== 2020 census ===
Lafayette County, Missouri – Racial and ethnic composition Note: the US Census treats Hispanic/Latino as an ethnic category. This table excludes Latinos from the racial categories and assigns them to a separate category. Hispanics/Latinos may be of any race.
Race / Ethnicity (NH = Non-Hispanic)	Pop 1980	Pop 1990	Pop 2000	Pop 2010	Pop 2020	% 1980	% 1990	% 2000	% 2010	% 2020
White alone (NH)	28,798	29,831	31,290	31,002	29,256	96.23%	95.90%	94.93%	92.87%	88.70%
Black or African American alone (NH)	848	873	745	726	671	2.83%	2.81%	2.26%	2.17%	2.03%
Native American or Alaska Native alone (NH)	47	103	78	131	138	0.16%	0.33%	0.24%	0.39%	0.42%
Asian alone (NH)	57	66	80	125	115	0.19%	0.21%	0.24%	0.37%	0.35%
Native Hawaiian or Pacific Islander alone (NH)	x	x	9	45	12	x	x	0.03%	0.13%	0.04%
Other race alone (NH)	40	15	26	20	58	0.13%	0.05%	0.08%	0.06%	0.18%
Mixed race or Multiracial (NH)	x	x	346	592	1,687	x	x	1.05%	1.77%	5.11%
Hispanic or Latino (any race)	135	219	386	740	1,047	0.45%	0.70%	1.17%	2.22%	3.17%
Total	29,925	31,107	32,960	33,381	32,984	100.00%	100.00%	100.00%	100.00%	100.00%

As of the 2020 census, the county had a population of 32,984 and a median age of 41.7 years, with 23.0% of residents under the age of 18 and 19.3% of residents 65 years of age or older. For every 100 females there were 99.2 males, and for every 100 females age 18 and over there were 97.1 males age 18 and over.

The racial makeup of the county was 89.8% White, 2.1% Black or African American, 0.5% American Indian and Alaska Native, 0.4% Asian, 0.0% Native Hawaiian or Pacific Islander, 1.1% from some other race, and 6.1% from two or more races; Hispanic or Latino residents of any race comprised 3.2% of the population.

30.7% of residents lived in urban areas, while 69.3% lived in rural areas.

There were 12,864 households in the county, of which 30.7% had children under the age of 18 living with them and 23.3% had a female householder with no spouse or partner present. About 26.1% of all households were made up of individuals and 12.7% had someone living alone who was 65 years of age or older. There were 14,065 housing units, of which 8.5% were vacant. Among occupied housing units, 71.2% were owner-occupied and 28.8% were renter-occupied. The homeowner vacancy rate was 1.6% and the rental vacancy rate was 7.9%.

=== 2000 census ===
As of the 2000 census, there were 32,960 people, 12,569 households, and 9,099 families residing in the county. The population density was 52 people per square mile (20 people/km^{2}). There were 13,707 housing units at an average density of 22 units per square mile (8.5/km^{2}). The racial makeup of the county was 95.52% White, 2.27% Black or African American, 0.29% Native American, 0.25% Asian, 0.03% Pacific Islander, 0.51% from other races, and 1.12% from two or more races. Approximately 1.17% of the population were Hispanic or Latino of any race. 37.3% were of German, 17.5% American, 9.9% English and 9.7% Irish ancestry.

There were 12,569 households, out of which 33.90% had children under the age of 18 living with them, 59.30% were married couples living together, 9.40% had a female householder with no husband present, and 27.60% were non-families. 24.00% of all households were made up of individuals, and 11.20% had someone living alone who was 65 years of age or older. The average household size was 2.55 and the average family size was 3.01.

In the county, the population was spread out, with 26.20% under the age of 18, 7.60% from 18 to 24, 27.50% from 25 to 44, 23.30% from 45 to 64, and 15.40% who were 65 years of age or older. The median age was 38 years. For every 100 females there were 95.90 males. For every 100 females age 18 and over, there were 92.00 males.

The median income for a household in the county was $38,235, and the median income for a family was $45,717. Males had a median income of $31,972 versus $22,684 for females. The per capita income for the county was $18,493. About 6.90% of families and 8.80% of the population were below the poverty line, including 10.90% of those under age 18 and 9.10% of those ages 65 or over.

== Education ==
School districts which cover any part of the county, no matter how slight, include:

- Concordia R-II School District
- Lafayette County C-1 School District
- Lexington R-V School District
- Oak Grove R-VI School District (has schools in another county)
- Odessa R-VII School District
- Richmond R-XVI School District
- Santa Fe R-X School District
- Wellington-Napoleon R-IX School District

=== Public schools ===
- Concordia R-II School District – Concordia
  - Concordia Elementary School (PK-06)
  - Concordia High School (07-12)
- Lafayette County C-1 School District – Higginsville
  - Grandview Elementary School (PK-05)
  - Lafayette County Middle School (06-08)
  - Lafayette County High School (09-12)
- Lexington R-V School District – Lexington
  - Leslie Bell Elementary School (PK-04)
  - Lexington Middle School (05-08)
  - Lexington High School (09-12)
- Odessa R-VII School District – Odessa
  - McQuerry Elementary School (K-02)
  - Odessa Upper Elementary School (03-05)
  - Odessa Middle School (06-08)
  - Odessa High School (09-12)
- Santa Fe R-X School District – Alma
  - Santa Fe Elementary School (K-06)
  - Santa Fe High School (07-12)
- Wellington-Napoleon R-IX School District – Wellington
  - Wellington-Napoleon Elementary School (PK-06)
  - Wellington-Napoleon High School (07-12)

=== Private schools ===
- Trinity Lutheran School – Alma (K-08) – Lutheran
- Immanuel Lutheran School – Higginsville (K-08) – Lutheran
- Victory Christian Fellowship School – Waverly (K-12) – Nondenominational Christian
- St. Paul Lutheran High School – Concordia (09-12) – Lutheran
- St. Paul's Lutheran School – Concordia (K-8) – Lutheran

=== Public libraries ===
- Robertson Memorial Library
- Trails Regional Library

=== Colleges and universities ===
Metropolitan Community College has the school districts in this county in its service area, but not its in-district taxation area.

== Politics ==
=== Local ===
The Republican Party mostly controls politics at the local level in Lafayette County. Republicans hold all but three of the elected positions in the county.

Lafayette County, Missouri

Elected countywide officials
Assessor	Chip Langman	Democratic
Circuit Clerk	Deana Aversman	Republican
County Clerk	Linda Niendick	Republican
Collector	Lori Fiegenbaum	Democratic
Commissioner (presiding)	Harold Hoflander	Republican
Commissioner (district 1)	Craig Williams	Republican
Commissioner (district 2)	Tracy Dyer	Republican
Coroner	David Pulliam	Republican
Prosecuting Attorney	Kristen Ellis Hilbrenner	Democratic
Public Administrator	Barb Copenhaver	Republican
Recorder	JoAnn Swartz	Republican
Sheriff	Kerrick Alumbaugh	Republican
Surveyor	Mark Nolte	Republican
Treasurer	Jennifer Jellum	Republican

=== State ===
Past Gubernatorial Elections Results
Year	Republican	Democratic	Third Parties
2024	73.38% 12,571	25.01% 4,285	1.60% 275
2020	71.85% 12,238	26.13% 4,451	2.02% 244
2016	57.85% 9,167	38.47% 6,097	3.68% 583
2012	47.91% 7,537	49.31% 7,758	2.78% 438
2008	42.70% 7,022	55.09% 9,060	2.21% 364
2004	52.97% 8,541	45.59% 7,351	1.43% 231
2000	50.32% 7,276	47.94% 6,932	1.74% 251
1996	34.00% 4,450	63.05% 8,252	2.94% 385

Lafayette County is divided into two legislative districts in the Missouri House of Representatives, both of which are held by Republicans.

- District 33 — Donna Pfautsch (R-Harrisonville). Consists of the community of Oak Grove.

Missouri House of Representatives — District 33 — Lafayette County (2016)
Party	Candidate	Votes	%	±%
Republican	Donna Pfautsch	12,115	72.86%	−2.81
Democratic	Chase Linder	5,127	29.74%	+19.03

Missouri House of Representatives — District 33 — Lafayette County (2014)
Party	Candidate	Votes	%	±%
Republican	Donna Pfautsch	6,434	71.9%	+10.96
Democratic	Syed Asif	1,458	16.3%	−27.18
Libertarian	Matt Stephens	1,052	11.8%	+16.22

Missouri House of Representatives — District 33 — Lafayette County (2012)
Party	Candidate	Votes	%	±%
Republican	Donna Pfautsch	10,193	63.7%	
Democratic	Ron Harvey	5,814	36.3%	

- District 53 – Glen Kolkmeyer (R-Odessa). Consists of almost all of the county.

Missouri House of Representatives — District 53 — Lafayette County (2016)
Party	Candidate	Votes	%	±%
Republican	Glen Kolkmeyer	13,719	100.00%	+38.93

Missouri House of Representatives — District 53 — Lafayette County (2014)
Party	Candidate	Votes	%	±%
Republican	Glen Kolkmeyer	5,818	61.07%	+2.43
Democratic	Henry Grubb	3,709	38.93%	−2.43

Missouri House of Representatives — District 53 — Lafayette County (2012)
Party	Candidate	Votes	%	±%
Republican	Glen Kolkmeyer	9,095	58.64%	
Democratic	Holmes Osborne	6,416	41.36%	

All of Lafayette County is a part of Missouri's 21st District in the Missouri Senate and is currently represented by Denny Hoskins (R-Warrensburg).

Missouri Senate — District 21 — Lafayette County (2016)
Party	Candidate	Votes	%	±%
Republican	Denny Hoskins	9,738	63.36%	+1.36
Democratic	ElGene Ver Dught	4,864	31.65%	−2.80
Libertarian	Bill Wayne	768	5.00%	−1.45

Missouri Senate — District 21 — Lafayette County (2012)
Party	Candidate	Votes	%	±%
Republican	David Pearce	9,547	62.00%	
Democratic	ElGene Ver Dught	5,305	34.45%	
Libertarian	Steven Hedrick	547	3.55%	

=== Federal ===
U.S. Senate — Missouri — Lafayette County (2016)
Party	Candidate	Votes	%	±%
Republican	Roy Blunt	8,812	55.55%	+12.89
Democratic	Jason Kander	6,150	38.77%	−10.49
Libertarian	Jonathan Dine	436	2.75%	−5.33
Green	Johnathan McFarland	167	1.05%	+1.05
Constitution	Fred Ryman	299	1.88%	+1.88

U.S. Senate — Missouri — Lafayette County (2012)
Party	Candidate	Votes	%	±%
Republican	Todd Akin	6,663	42.66%	
Democratic	Claire McCaskill	7,695	49.26%	
Libertarian	Jonathan Dine	1,262	8.08%	

All of Lafayette County is included in Missouri's 5th Congressional District, which is currently represented by Emanuel Cleaver (D-Kansas City) in the U.S. House of Representatives.

U.S. House of Representatives — Missouri's 5th Congressional District — Lafayette County (2016)
Party	Candidate	Votes	%	±%
Democratic	Emanuel Cleaver II	5,744	36.50%	+3.58
Republican	Jacob Turk	9,505	60.39%	−3.58
Libertarian	Roy Welborn	490	3.11%	

U.S. House of Representatives — Missouri's 5th Congressional District — Lafayette County (2014)
Party	Candidate	Votes	%	±%
Democratic	Emanuel Cleaver II	3,153	32.92%	−6.74
Republican	Jacob Turk	6,128	63.97%	+6.90
Libertarian	Roy Welborn	298	3.11%	−0.16

U.S. House of Representatives — Missouri’s 5th Congressional District — Lafayette County (2012)
Party	Candidate	Votes	%	±%
Democratic	Emanuel Cleaver II	6,202	39.66%	
Republican	Jacob Turk	8,925	57.07%	
Libertarian	Randy Langkraehr	511	3.27%	

United States presidential election results for Lafayette County, Missouri
Year	Republican		Democratic		Third party(ies)	
Year	No.	%	No.	%	No.	%
1888	2,819	41.27%	3,865	56.59%	146	2.14%
1892	2,833	40.33%	3,922	55.83%	270	3.84%
1896	3,375	42.72%	4,463	56.49%	63	0.80%
1900	3,311	43.40%	4,217	55.28%	101	1.32%
1904	3,531	48.82%	3,583	49.54%	119	1.65%
1908	3,771	48.57%	3,865	49.78%	128	1.65%
1912	2,367	31.73%	3,650	48.93%	1,442	19.33%
1916	4,049	49.09%	4,073	49.38%	126	1.53%
1920	7,471	54.40%	6,169	44.92%	94	0.68%
1924	6,517	50.43%	5,877	45.48%	529	4.09%
1928	7,687	56.28%	5,939	43.48%	32	0.23%
1932	5,670	41.65%	7,906	58.08%	37	0.27%
1936	7,535	50.70%	7,275	48.95%	51	0.34%
1940	8,802	55.91%	6,913	43.91%	29	0.18%
1944	7,951	58.63%	5,603	41.32%	7	0.05%
1948	6,634	52.48%	5,988	47.37%	20	0.16%
1952	8,805	59.26%	6,020	40.52%	32	0.22%
1956	8,133	57.22%	6,081	42.78%	0	0.00%
1960	8,011	59.05%	5,555	40.95%	0	0.00%
1964	5,493	42.60%	7,400	57.40%	0	0.00%
1968	6,840	53.42%	4,859	37.95%	1,105	8.63%
1972	9,187	69.34%	4,063	30.66%	0	0.00%
1976	6,823	51.28%	6,410	48.18%	72	0.54%
1980	7,271	53.99%	5,792	43.01%	405	3.01%
1984	8,581	63.90%	4,848	36.10%	0	0.00%
1988	6,825	54.54%	5,654	45.18%	35	0.28%
1992	4,651	34.54%	5,213	38.71%	3,603	26.75%
1996	5,489	41.57%	6,118	46.34%	1,596	12.09%
2000	7,849	54.06%	6,343	43.68%	328	2.26%
2004	9,656	59.67%	6,412	39.62%	114	0.70%
2008	9,442	56.88%	6,902	41.58%	256	1.54%
2012	9,803	61.79%	5,655	35.64%	408	2.57%
2016	10,988	68.78%	4,053	25.37%	934	5.85%
2020	12,273	71.96%	4,472	26.22%	310	1.82%
2024	12,720	73.75%	4,294	24.90%	234	1.36%

== Communities ==
=== Cities and towns ===
- Alma
- Aullville
- Bates City
- Blackburn (part)
- Concordia
- Corder
- Dover
- Emma (part)
- Higginsville
- Lake Lafayette
- Lexington (county seat)
- Mayview
- Napoleon
- Oak Grove (part)
- Odessa
- Waverly
- Wellington

=== Unincorporated communities ===
- Chapel Hill
- Ernestville
- Greenton
- Hodge
- Myrick
- Page City
- Tabeau
- Waterloo

== See also ==
- List of counties in Missouri
- National Register of Historic Places listings in Lafayette County, Missouri
