= List of University of Michigan arts alumni =

The parent article is at List of University of Michigan alumni.

Academic unit key
Symbol	Academic unit
ARCH	Taubman College of Architecture and Urban Planning
BUS	Ross School of Business
COE	College of Engineering
DENT	School of Dentistry
GFSPP	Gerald R. Ford School of Public Policy
HHRS	Horace H. Rackham School of Graduate Studies
LAW	Law School
LSA	College of LS&A
MED	Medical School
SMTD	School of Music, Theatre and Dance
PHARM	School of Pharmacy
SED	School of Education
SNRE	School of Natural Resources
SOAD	The Stamps School of Art & Design
SOI	School of Information
SON	School of Nursing
SOK	School of Kinesiology
SOSW	School of Social Work
SPH	School of Public Health
MDNG	Matriculated, did not graduate

This is a list of arts-related alumni from the University of Michigan.

== Art, architecture, and design ==
=== Architecture and civil engineering ===
- James Baird, civil engineer; directed the construction of the Flatiron Building, Lincoln Memorial, Arlington Memorial Amphitheater, and Tomb of the Unknown Soldier
- John W. F. Bennett, civil engineer; supervised the construction of the Algonquin Hotel in New York and the Ritz and Waldorf Hotels in London
- Charles Correa (ARCH: B.Arch. 1953, Honorary Doctor of Architecture 1980), architect
- John Dinkeloo, civil engineer; partner of 1982 Pritzker Prize laureate Kevin Roche in the firm Roche-Dinkeloo
- Alden B. Dow, architect; son of Herbert Henry Dow (founder of the Dow Chemical Company) and Grace A. Dow
- Dan Dworsky (ARCH: B.Arch. 1950), architect who designed the University's Crisler Arena and the Federal Reserve Bank in Los Angeles; member of varsity football starting team at Michigan, 1945–1948; played professionally for the Los Angeles Dons in 1949; member of Jewish Sports Hall of Fame; all-time 50-year Rose Bowl team
- Francis E. Griffin (BS ca. 1935), architect in Detroit
- Maynard Lyndon (1907–1999), architect
- Malcolm McCullough, U of M architecture professor and author
- Charles Willard Moore (ARCH: B.Arch 1947, Hon Arch D. 1992), designer of Lurie Tower on Michigan's North Campus; winner of the AIA Gold Medal in 1991
- Howard Sims (B.Arch 1963, M.Arch 1966), architect in Detroit

=== Academics ===
- Raymond Ward Bissell (BA 1958, PhD 1966), art historian, professor of Art History Emeritus at the University of Michigan
- Jonathan M. Bloom (MA 1975), scholar of Islamic art, Norma Jean Calderwood University Professor of Islamic and Asian Art at Boston College
- Richard Keyes (SOAD: BA Design 1957), professor emeritus at Long Beach City College, after a 30-year career there teaching life drawing and painting
- Ralph Rapson, head of architecture at the University of Minnesota for many years; one of the world's oldest and most prolific practicing architects at his death at age 93
- Marilyn Stokstad (PhD, 1957), art historian, Judith Harris Murphy Distinguished Professor of Art History Emeritus at the University of Kansas

=== Designers ===
- John DeLorean (BUS: MBA 1957), GM Group vice president; designer of the DeLorean
- Tony Fadell (COE: BSE CompE 1991), designer, inventor, "father of the Apple iPod"
- Susan Skarsgard (SOAD: MFA), graphic designer and calligrapher

=== Fine artists ===
- Benny Alba, painter, graduated in psychology
- Alice R. Ballard (BS, MFA 1968), ceramicist
- Bill Barrett (BS 1958, MS, MFA), sculptor and painter
- Mike Kelley (BFA 1976), gross-out artist in L.A., in the style of Paul McCarthy
- Tristan Meinecke (c. 1942, did not graduate), painter, writer, architect
- Robert Nickle (BA 1943), visual artist, known primarily for his "street scrap" collage work; studied architecture and design at Michigan; worked and taught at the Art Institute of Chicago
- Michele Oka Doner, visual artist and writer; Stamps School of Art & Design: BFA, 1966; MFA, 1968, Alumna in Residence, 1990, Hon. Dr. Fine Arts, 2016
- Jason Polan, artist and illustrator; Stamps School of Art & Design: BFA, 2004
- Bernard "Tony" Rosenthal (BA 1936), abstract sculptor
- Alison Ruttan (BFA, Photography, 1976), interdisciplinary artist and educator at the School of the Art Institute of Chicago
- Eric Staller (BA 1971, Artist Architecture), mixed media visual artist
- Cosmo Whyte (SOAD MFA 2015), Jamaican-born American sculptor, painter, installation artist
- Matthew Wong (BA 2007), painter
- Alisa Yang (MFA, 2016), interdisciplinary artist and filmmaker

=== Others ===
- Jesse Frohman (BA Economics), photographer
- Kathryn Osebold Galbraith, writer of children's books
- Charles L. Kuhn (BA 1923), director of the Busch-Reisinger Museum at Harvard University
- Warren M. Robbins (MFA), art collector whose collection led to the formation of the National Museum of African Art at the Smithsonian Institution
- William A. Starrett, builder of the Empire State Building
- Harold P. Stern (BA 1943, MA 1948, PhD 1959), director of the Freer Gallery of Art
- Martha Tedeschi (MA, 1982), Elizabeth and John Moors Cabot Director of the Harvard Art Museums
- Raoul Wallenberg (ARCH: B.Arch 1935), Swedish diplomat famous for assisting Hungarian Jews in late World War II; namesake of the Wallenberg Fellowship and Taubman College's Wallenberg Studio
- Judd Winick (BA 1992 Drawing and Painting), cartoonist, screenwriter, author

== Arts and entertainment ==
=== Dance ===
- Nina Davuluri (BS 2011), first Indian American Miss America (Miss America 2014); first to perform a Bollywood dance on that pageant's stage
- Janet Lilly, principal dancer for Bill T. Jones/Arnie Zane Dance Company
- Sharmila Mukerjee, Odissi dancer and choreographer, a disciple of Guru Kelucharan Mohapatra
- Kapila Vatsyayan (born 1928), a leading scholar of Indian classical dance, art, architecture, and art history

=== Directors, producers, and screenwriters ===
- Libby Appel, fourth artistic director of the Oregon Shakespeare Festival
- Wyatt Bardouille (BS 1997), producer and director of Dominica: Charting a Future for Paradise
- William J. Bell (March 6, 1927 – April 29, 2005), screenwriter and television producer, best known as the creator of the soap operas Another World, The Young and the Restless and The Bold and the Beautiful
- Forman Brown (BA 1922), established Yale Puppeteers upon graduating; opened a puppet theatre in Los Angeles in the 1920s which attracted celebrity attention and support from Greta Garbo, Marie Dressler, Douglas Fairbanks, and Albert Einstein
- David Callaham (BA 1999), screenwriter of Shang-Chi and the Legend of the Ten Rings
- Lillian Glass, award-winning director and producer, Reinventing Rosalee, Fiesty Fighter, Hey Beautiful, and De-Escalation

=== National Book Award ===
- Kevin Boyle, won the 2004 National Book Award for Arc of Justice: A Saga of Race, Civil Rights, and Murder in the Jazz Age
- Howard Moss, won the National Book Award in 1972 for Selected Poems
- Frank O'Hara, shared the 1972 National Book Award for Poetry for The Collected Poems of Frank O'Hara, the first of several collections
- Theodore Roethke, won the annual National Book Award for Poetry in 1959 for Words for the Wind, and posthumously in 1965 for The Far Field
- Keith Waldrop, won the National Book Award for Poetry for his 2009 collection Transcendental Studies: A Trilogy
- Jesmyn Ward, won the 2011 National Book Award for Fiction for her second novel Salvage the Bones and the 2017 National Book Award for Sing, Unburied, Sing; the only two-time female winner
- Gloria Whelan, won the annual National Book Award for Young People's Literature in 2000 for the novel Homeless Bird

=== National Medal of the Arts ===
- James Earl Jones, 1992 recipient
- Arthur Miller, 1993 recipient
- Jessye Norman, 2009 recipient
- Roger L. Stevens, 1988 recipient

=== Emmy Award ===
Collectively, as of 2017, 31 Michigan alumni have won 87 Emmy Awards.

- James A. Baffico, winner of 2 Emmy Awards
- Michael Bellavia, winner of an Emmy Award
- Reg E. Cathey, winner of an Emmy Award
- David Connell, winner of 5 Emmy Awards
- Darren Criss, winner of an Emmy Award: Outstanding Lead Actor in a Limited Series or Movie (The Assassination of Gianni Versace: American Crime Story)
- Ann B. Davis, winner of 2 Emmy Awards
- Paul Devlin, winner of 5 Emmy Awards
- Neal Gabler, winner of an Emmy Award
- Cathy Guisewite, winner of an Emmy Award
- Sanjay Gupta, winner of an Emmy Award
- Peter Hansen, winner of an Emmy Award
- Gary Hutzel, winner of 4 Emmy Awards
- James Earl Jones, winner of 8 Emmy Awards
- Mick Kaczorowski, winner of 3 Emmy Awards
- Christine Lahti, winner of 3 Emmy Awards
- Joseph LoDuca, winner of 2 Emmy Awards
- Margo Martindale, winner of 3 Emmy Awards
- Bob McGrath, received a lifetime achievement Emmy in 1990
- Ari Melber (born 1980), journalist for NBC News and host of MSNBC's The Beat with Ari Melber
- Arthur Miller, winner of 2 Emmy Awards
- Marilyn Suzanne Miller, winner of 3 Emmy Awards
- Pasek and Paul (Benj Pasek and Justin Paul), winners of an Emmy Award
- Gilda Radner, winner of 2 Emmy Awards
- John Rich, winner of 3 Emmy Awards
- Davy Rothbart, winner of an Emmy Award
- Kurt Sayenga, winner of an Emmy Award
- David Shuster, winner of an Emmy Award
- Curt Sobel, winner of an Emmy Award
- Mike Wallace, winner of 21 Emmy Awards
- Don Was, winner of an Emmy Award
- Beth Tanenhaus Winsten, winner of an Emmy Award

=== Golden Globe Award winners ===
- Darren Criss, actor, singer and songwriter; won in 2019
- Gary Gilbert (born 1965), film producer and the founder and president of Gilbert Films
- James Earl Jones (1931–2024), actor; career has spanned more than 60 years
- Christine Lahti (born 1950), actress, filmmaker, two-time Golden Globe winner
- Jeff Levy-Hinte (a.k.a. Jeffrey Kusama-Hinte), film producer; president of Antidote International Films
- Madonna (Madonna Louise Ciccone; born 1958), singer, songwriter, actress, and businesswoman
- Pasek and Paul (Benj Pasek and Justin Paul), songwriting duo and composing team for musical theater, films, and television
- John Rich (1925–2012), film and television director

=== Grammy Award winners ===
- George Crumb (D.M.A.) (born 1929), composer of avant-garde music; winner of a Grammy and a Pulitzer prize
- Chip Davis (B.A.) (born 1947), founder and leader of Mannheim Steamroller
- John M. Eargle (M.A.) (1931–2007), Oscar and Grammy-winning audio engineer; musician
- David Effron (B.A.), conductor and educator
- Gabriela Lena Frank (D.M.A.) (born 1972), pianist and composer of contemporary classical music
- Joe Henry (B.A.) (born 1960), singer-songwriter, guitarist, and producer; has released 13 studio albums and produced multiple recordings for other artists, including three Grammy Award-winning albums
- Bob James (M.A.) (born 1939), multiple Grammy Award-winning jazz keyboardist, arranger, and record producer
- James Earl Jones (B.A.) (1931–2024), actor; career spanning more than 60 years; has won three Grammys
- Fred LaBour (M.A.) (born 1948), better known by his stage name Too Slim; Grammy award-winning musician, best known for his work with the Western swing musical and comedy group Riders in the Sky
- Madonna (MDNG) (born 1958), singer, songwriter, actress, and businesswoman; referred to as the "Queen of Pop" since the 1980s; seven-time Grammy award winner
- Jessye Norman (MUSIC: MMUS 1968; HSCD 1987), opera and concert singer; 4-time Grammy winner
- Pasek and Paul (B.F.As) (Benj Pasek and Justin Paul), songwriting duo and composing team; Grammy winner
- Gilda Radner (1946–1989), comedian, actress, and one of seven original cast members of SNL
- Christopher Rouse (University of Michigan fellow) (born 1949), composer
- Jennifer Laura Thompson (B.F.A. 1991), actress and singer
- Don Was (MDNG) (born 1952), musician, record producer and record executive; winner of three Grammy awards

=== Tony Award winners ===
- Gavin James Creel (1976–2024), actor, singer, and songwriter; best known for his work in musical theatre; received a Tony Award for his performance as Cornelius Hackl in Hello, Dolly!
- Darren Criss, 2025 Tony Award for Best Performance by an Actor in a Leading Role in a Musical for his performance as Oliver in Maybe Happy Ending
- David Allen Grier, for A Soldier's Play
- Gregory Jbara (born 1961), film, television and stage actor, and singer
- James Earl Jones (born 1931), actor; career has spanned more than 60 years
- Celia Keenan-Bolger (born January 26, 1978), actress, portrayed Scout Finch in the play To Kill a Mockingbird
- Michael L. Maguire (born 1955), actor, best known for his role as Enjolras in the original Broadway production of the musical Les Misérables; this role won him a Tony Award in 1987
- Jeff Marx (born 1970), composer and lyricist of musicals; winner of two Tony Awards
- Marian Ethel Mercer (1935–2011), actress and singer
- Arthur Miller (1915–2005), playwright, essayist, and figure in twentieth-century American theater
- Jack O'Brien (born 1939), director, producer, writer, and lyricist; winner of three Tony Awards
- Paul Osborn, playwright and screenwriter best known for writing the screen adaptation of East of Eden; won 1980 Tony award for best Broadway revival for his play about four sisters, Morning's at Seven, which originally opened on Broadway in 1939
- Martin Pakledinaz (1953–2012), costume designer for stage and film; winner of two Tony Awards
- Pasek and Paul, known together as Pasek and Paul, songwriting duo and composing team for musical theater, films, and television
- Jeffrey Seller (born 1964) (BA 1986), Broadway producer; four-time Tony Award winner for Best Musical (Rent 1996, Avenue Q 2004, In the Heights 2008, Hamilton 2016)
- James D. Stern, film and Broadway producer; won a 2003 Tony Award for Hairspray

=== Graphic arts ===
- Lloyd Dangle (BFA 1983), cartoonist
- Beth Lo (BA 1971), artist
- Dwayne McDuffie (BA, MA), cartoonist and fantasy author
- Sid Meier (BS 1976), video game designer of over 60 titles, including the Civilization series, Pirates!, and Railroad Tycoon; co-founder of MicroProse and Firaxis Games
- Al Milgrom (BA 1972), comic book writer, penciller, inker and editor, primarily for Marvel Comics; known for ten-year run as editor of Marvel Fanfare; long involvement as writer, penciler, and inker on Peter Parker, the Spectacular Spider-Man; four-year tenure as West Coast Avengers penciller; and long stint as the inker of X-Factor
- Jim Ottaviani (MA nuclear engineering), author of several comic books about the history of science; Two-Fisted Science: Stories About Scientists features biographical stories about Galileo Galilei, Isaac Newton, Niels Bohr, and Richard Feynman
- Jason Rubin, video game director; comic book creator; Internet company founder; known for the Crash Bandicoot series of games
- Sam Viviano (AB 1975), art director and cover illustrator for MAD magazine

=== Music ===
==== Music: composers ====
- Clarice Assad (MA), her master's thesis concerto was recorded by Nadja Salerno-Sonnenberg
- Evan Chambers (PhD), composer, traditional Irish fiddler, and Professor of Composition at the University of Michigan
- Stephen Chatman (DMA 1977), composer
- Pius Cheung (Chinese name: 張 鈞 量) (PhD), marimbist and composer
- Robert Cogan (BM 1951, MM 1952), music theorist, composer, teacher
- Ellis, Mildred Katharine (MA 1937), pianist, music educator, composer, and musicologist
- Feist, Far East Movement and Natalia Kills; has co-written songs for Lady Gaga, t.A.T.u., Flipsyde, Tokio Hotel, Ai, Alexandra Burke and Colby O'Donis
- Gabriela Lena Frank (DMA 2001), composer, Guggenheim award winner
- Alexander Frey (BM, MM), conductor, pianist, organist, harpsichordist, composer
- Jay Gorney (LS&A: BA 1917; LAW: 1919), composer, songwriter of "Brother, Can You Spare A Dime?"
- Robert James (BA, MA), two-time Grammy Award-winning smooth jazz keyboardist, arranger and producer
- Laura Karpman (BM), composer for film, television, video games, theater, and the concert hall; winner of 5 Emmy Awards
- Andrew Lippa (BA 1987), lyricist and composer
- David T. Little, composer and drummer known for orchestral and operatic works
- Normand Lockwood, composer; studied composition at U-M 1921–1924; winner of a Guggenheim award
- George W. Meyer (PhD 1941), Tin Pan Alley songwriter; Guggenheim award winner
- Roger Reynolds (MM 1961), composer, Pulitzer Prize for Music, professor emeritus at University of California San Diego
- Frank Ticheli (MM 1983, DMA 1987), professor of Composition at the University of Southern California
- Thomas Tyra (MUSIC: PhD 1971), composer, arranger, bandmaster, and music educator
- Aleksandra Vrebalov (DMA 2002), Serbian composer
- Julia Wolfe, composer

==== Music: groups ====
- The Arbors, 1960s pop group (all four members; group named after Ann Arbor, Michigan)
- Ella Riot, band formed by Michigan undergraduates who coined "DanceThink" music
- George Frayne (BFA, MFA), founder of music group Commander Cody
- Nomo, band formed at U-M
- Tally Hall, band named after a shopping plaza in Michigan
- Vulfpeck, funk band founded in 2011 at the university's Duderstadt Center

==== Music: instrumentalists ====
- Don Blum (BA 1994), drummer in the band The Von Bondies
- Aaron Dworkin (MA 1998), violinist and music educator
- Carol Jantsch (BFA 2006), principal tubist for the Philadelphia Orchestra
- Laurence Kaptain (DMA), symphonic cimbalom artist
- Fred LaBour (MA), musician; instrumental in the spread of the "Paul is Dead" urban legend
- Randy Napoleon (BFA 1999), jazz guitarist
- Barbara Nissman (BM, MM, DMA); concert pianist known for her interpretations of the music of Ginastera and Prokofiev

==== Music: educators, musicologists, conductors and directors ====
- Charles M. Atkinson (MM 1965), musicologist
- Judith Becker (BA, PhD), ethnomusicologist
- Chalkdust, born Hollis Urban Lester Liverpool (PhD ethnomusicology), calypsonian from Trinidad and Tobago; ethnomusicologist at the University of the Virgin Islands
- Elim Chan, (MM 2011, DMA 2015), Music Director San Francisco Symphony
- James Kibbie (DMA 1981), concert organist, recording artist, professor of Organ at U-M
- Timothy McAllister (BM 95, MM 97, DMA, 2002), Grammy award-winning classical saxophonist; member of PRISM Quartet; current professor of Saxophone at U-M
- Daniel Bernard Roumain (PhD), composer and performer, the self-styled "Dred Violinist"
- Norma Wendelburg, composer, pianist and academic teacher

==== Music: producers ====
- Ian Eisendrath, executive music producer K-Pop Demon Hunters, Snow White, Lyle Lyle Crocodile, Spirited
- Joe Henry, singer, songwriter, music producer
- Martin Kierszenbaum (also known as Cherry Cherry Boom Boom; "Kirschbaum" is German for cherry tree), head of A&R at Interscope Records; president of Interscope's subsidiary imprint Cherrytree Records; songwriter; producer; A&R for Lady Gaga, Sting, Keane, Tokio Hotel
- Felix Pappalardi, musician, record producer
- Richard Perry (BA 1964), record producer
- David Shayman, aka Disco D (BUS: BBA 2002), helped pioneer Detroit booty music and later named it "ghettotech"; producer of hip-hop, R&B, and dancehall tracks
- Sam Valenti IV (BA 2000), founded independent record label Ghostly International in 1999
- David Was (David Weiss, BA 1974), musician and producer, Was (Not Was); music critic and commentator
- Don Was (Don Fagenson, MDNG: 1970–1971), record producer; Blue Note Records president and musician, Was (Not Was)
- Jack Yellen (BA 1913), lyricist and screenwriter; two of his most recognized songs are "Happy Days Are Here Again" and "Ain't She Sweet"; ASCAP board of directors (1951–69); Songwriters Hall of Fame 1972

==== Music: vocalists ====
- Becky Baeling Lythgoe (BFA), singer, actress, producer
- Chris Bathgate (BFA), indie folk singer-songwriter and musician in the Ann Arbor and Ypsilanti folk music scene in Michigan
- Janai Brugger (MM), operatic soprano
- Michelle Chamuel (BA 2008), singer, songwriter, producer
- Muriel Costa-Greenspon (AB, MA), mezzo-soprano who performed with the New York City Opera for thirty years; a daughter of deaf parents
- David Daniels (MM 1992), countertenor
- Joe Dassin (PhD), French singer
- Michael Fabiano (BM 2005), operatic tenor
- Elizabeth Fischer Monastero (BM 1956), operatic mezzo-soprano, voice teacher
- Theo Katzman (BA 2008), singer, songwriter, producer
- Holden Madagame, transgender opera singer tenor
- Madonna, born Madonna Ciccone (MDNG: 1976–1978), singer and actress
- Niagara, musician; painter; lead vocalist of the punk rock bands Destroy All Monsters and Dark Carnival
- Sean Panikkar (BM, MM), opera singer; member of the classical crossover group Forte Tenors
- Nicholas Phan, tenor, performer of oratorio and opera
- Iggy Pop, born James Osterberg, Jr. (MDNG: 1963–1964), rock star
- Ashley Putnam (BM 1974, MM 1975), opera and concert singer
- Antwaun Stanley, singer, songwriter
- Christopher Temporelli, operatic bass and concert singer, radio host, TV personality, personal development coach, speaker, and author
- Vienna Teng, born Cynthia Yih Shih, Taiwanese American pianist and singer-songwriter; albums include Waking Hour (2002), Warm Strangers (2004), Dreaming Through The Noise (2006), and Inland Territory (2009); live album, The Moment Always Vanishing (2009), on which she is double-billed with her percussionist, Alex Wong
- Dick Valentine (BA 1994), singer of Electric Six
- Sachal Vasandani, jazz vocalist

=== Academy Award nominees and winners ===
- John Briley (BA 1951, MA 1952), won Academy Award For Best Original Screenplay, Gandhi
- Valentine Davies, Miracle on 34th Street earned him an Academy Award for Best Story in 1947
- Charles Crawford Davis (COE: 1916), won 1948 Oscar for his invention of the Davis Drive System, a system for merging sound with pictures and driving the film through movie cameras and projectors
- Michael Dunn (MDNG), nominated for Best Supporting Actor in 1966 for Ship of Fools
- John M. Eargle (MM 1954), Oscar and Grammy-winning audio engineer; musician (piano, church and theater organ)
- Michael Epstein (BArch), also winner of two George Foster Peabody Awards, an Emmy, and a Writers Guild Award
- Gary Gilbert (BBA), The Kids Are All Right (nominated for Best Picture); producer; founder and president of Gilbert Films
- James Earl Jones (BFA 1955), actor; the voice of Darth Vader in the Star Wars movies; winner of two Tony Awards and an honorary Oscar
- Laura Karpman (BM), nominated for the Academy Award for Best Original Score for American Fiction
- Lawrence Edward "Larry" Kasdan (MA), The Big Chill (nominated, screenplay), Grand Canyon (nominated, screenplay), The Accidental Tourist (nominated, screenplay; Best Picture); Grand Canyon won the Golden Bear at the 42nd Berlin International Film Festival
- Christine Lahti (BFA 1972), actress; winner of the Academy Award, an Emmy, and two Golden Globe awards
- Kurt Luedtke, Out of Africa (winner – Writing Adapted Screenplay)
- Arthur Miller (BA 1938), nominated for The Crucible; the play was adapted for film twice, by Jean-Paul Sartre as the 1957 film Les Sorcières de Salem and by Miller himself as the 1996 film The Crucible; his adaptation earned him an Academy Award nomination for Best Screenplay based on Previously Produced Material, his only nomination
- John Nelson, Academy Awards for Best Visual Effects for Gladiator and Blade Runner 2049
- Dudley Nichols, nominated for Best Screenplay for The Long Voyage Home in 1941, for Best Original Screenplay for Air Force in 1944, and for Best Story and Screenplay (Written Directly for the Screen) for The Tin Star in 1958; he won Best Screenplay for The Informer in 1936, but initially refused the honor due to an ongoing writers' strike
- Pasek and Paul (Benj Pasek and Justin Paul), EGOT winning songwriting duo and composing team for musical theater, films, and television; Best Musical Theater Album for Dear Evan Hansen

=== Talent management ===
- George Finkel (BA 1958), TV sports producer for NBC Sports 1971–1990; won three Emmy awards
- Dan Glickman (BA 1966), president and CEO of the Motion Picture Association of America, Inc.

=== Theatre, film, and television ===
- Stanley Bahorek (BFA 2003), actor
- Britt Baron (BFA 2013), actress
- Rick Bayless, chef who specializes in modern interpretations of traditional Mexican cuisine; known for PBS series Mexico: One Plate at a Time
- Michael Bellavia (BS 1991), Emmy Award-winning president of Animax Entertainment
- Selma Blair (BA 1994), actress, known for Cruel Intentions and Legally Blonde
- Zachary Booth (BFA 2004), actor
- Sophina Brown (BFA), actor, Numb3rs
- David Burtka (BFA 1997), actor; chef; entertainment news correspondent for E! News
- Bruno Campos (LAW), Brazilian-born actor, Nip/Tuck
- Jessica Cauffiel (SMTD: BFA), actress
- Esther K. Chae (MA), actress
- Darren Criss (BFA 2009), actor; singer-songwriter; cast member of Glee; member of StarKid Productions
- Ann B. Davis (BFA 1948), two-time Emmy award winner, played the secretary in The Bob Cummings Show and Alice Nelson on The Brady Bunch
- Donald Alan "Don" Diamond (BA 1942), radio, film, and television actor; known for his comic portrayal as Crazy Cat on the 1960s television sitcom F Troop
- Erin Dilly, actress; Truly Scrumptious in the 2005 musical Chitty Chitty Bang Bang, for which she was nominated for a Tony Award and the Outer Critics Circle Award
- Michael Dunn, aka Gary Neil Miller (MDNG), actor, known for his recurring role as mad scientist Dr. Miguelito Loveless in the 1960s TV series The Wild Wild West
- Barrett Foa (BFA 1999), actor, known for portraying Eric Beale on NCIS: Los Angeles
- Hunter Foster (BFA 1992), Tony Award-nominated actor
- Stephen Fung Tak-Lun (BA 1992), Hong Kong-based actor, singer, model, writer and film director
- Alexander Gemignani, actor, tenor
- David Alan Grier (BA 1978), actor, comedian
- Erika Henningsen (BFA 2014), Broadway actress, known for originating the role of Cady Heron in Mean Girls and the voice of Charlie Morningstar in Hazbin Hotel on Amazon Prime Video
- Avery Hopwood (AB 1905), one of the most successful playwrights of the Jazz Age
- Ruth Hussey, actress
- Stephanie Izard (BA), chef; winner of the fourth season of Top Chef, Bravo's cooking competition show
- Gregory Jbara (MDNG: 1979–1981), Tony award-winning actor
- Tusshar Kapoor (BBA), actor in Indian cinema
- Andrew Keenan-Bolger (BFA 2007), known for the role of Crutchy in Disney's Newsies, as well as for his video blog, "Andrew's Blog"
- Celia Keenan-Bolger (BFA 2000), Broadway actress who originated the role of Olive Ostrovsky in The 25th Annual Putnam County Spelling Bee; Éponine in the revival of Les Misérables
- Carrie Keranen, voice actress
- Nancy Kovack, film and TV actress; attended U-M at age 15 and graduated by 19; appeared on Star Trek and Bewitched; nominated for an Emmy for an appearance on Mannix in 1969
- Ethan Laidlaw, actor
- Mark Lenard, actor, including several Star Trek movies
- Matt Letscher (BA 1992), film and TV actor; The Mask of Zorro
- Lucy Liu (BFA 1990), actress, known for Ally McBeal, Elementary and for the movie versions of Charlie's Angels
- Taylor Louderman, Broadway actress, known for originating roles Campbell in Bring It On: The Musical and Regina George in Mean Girls the Musical
- Strother Martin (BA 1947), actor, member of the diving team
- Margo Martindale, film, stage and television actress; Emmy Award winner
- Bob McGrath (1954), actor, singer, and writer; "Bob" from PBS' Sesame Street
- Mark Metcalf (BA 1968), actor in television and film
- Andy Mientus, actor, singer, writer
- Eric Millegan, Bones
- Emily Morse (born 1970), sex therapist, author, and media personality
- Sydney Morton, played a recurring character in Spike Lee's She's Gotta Have It
- Taylor Nichols, actor
- Michael O'Brien, writer Saturday Night Live 2009–2015, cast member 2013–14
- Beverley Owen (née Ogg, sometimes credited as Beverly Owen), known for having played Marilyn Munster
- Eren Ozker (1970), puppeteer and Muppet performer
- Ashley Park (BFA 2013), Broadway actress known for her work in The King and I and for originating the role of Gretchen Wieners in Mean Girls
- Rob Paulsen (1975), actor (attended 1975 only)
- David Paymer (BA 1975), character actor, Carpool, Get Shorty
- Jean Peters, actress
- Gilda Radner (BA 1970), actress and comedian, known for her work on Saturday Night Live for which she won an Emmy in 1978
- Blake Roman (BFA 2019), actor, Erwin "Chopin" Bootz in Harmony
- Ted Raimi (BA 1983), actor, seaQuest DSV and Xena: Warrior Princess
- William Russ, actor; the father on Boy Meets World
- Ellen Sandweiss (MA in Theatre Management), B-movie actress; has performed in musical theatre as a dancer and pop singer, and in a one-woman show of Jewish music
- Martha Scott (BA 1934), actress, Our Town (Academy Award nomination), The Ten Commandments, Ben Hur
- Miriam Shor (BFA), film, stage, and television actress
- Douglas Sills, actor
- Randy and Jason Sklar, professionally known as the Sklar Brothers, identical twin comedians
- StarKid Productions, the cast and creators of YouTube sensation, A Very Potter Musical
- Jennifer Laura Thompson (BFA 1991), Tony Award-nominated actress, played Glinda in the Broadway musical Wicked
- Carlos Valdes (SMTD BA 2011), actor and musician, The Flash
- Kapila Vatsyayan (MA), Indian arts scholar; founder and director of Indira Kalakendra
- Mike Weinberg (BFA 2015), actor, Life as a House, Home Alone 4
- James Wolk (BFA 2007), actor, Front of the Class, The Crazy Ones

=== Writers of fiction, poetry, and nonfiction ===
- Daniel Aaron (BA 1933), author of many articles and books, including Men of Good Hope: A Story of American Progressives, The Unwritten War: Writers of the Civil War and, with Richard Hofstadter and William Miller, The Structure of American History
- Megan Abbott (BA), author of crime fiction and of a non-fiction analysis of hardboiled crime fiction; Mystery Writers of America Edgar Allan Poe Award in 2008 for Queenpin
- Saladin Ahmed (BA), Arab-American science fiction and fantasy writer and poet
- Uwem Akpan (MFA 2007), Nigerian author; Jesuit priest; won Commonwealth Writers' Prize for Best First Book and the PEN/Beyond Margins Award for Say You're One of Them
- Jennifer Allison (BA), author of mystery novels and the Gilda Joyce children's series
- Olive San Louie Anderson, author of An American Girl, and Her Four Years in a Boys' College
- Max Apple (BA 1963), author of The Oranging of America (1976, short stories), Zip: A Novel of the Left and the Right (1978, novel), Three Stories (1983, short stories), Free Agents (1984, novel), The Propheteers: A Novel (1987, novel), and Roommates: My Grandfather's Story (1994, biography of his grandfather)
- Robert Arthur, Jr. (BA 1930), writer, novelist, editor; created "The Three Investigators" mystery series for young readers and worked on the anthology TV series Alfred Hitchcock Presents
- Robert Asprin (MDNG: 1964–1965), science fiction and fantasy author
- Brit Bennett (MFA 2014), author of The Mothers (2016)
- Sven Birkerts (AB 1973), essayist and author of The Gutenberg Elegies; son of emeritus faculty member Gunnar Birkerts
- Martha Arnold Boughton (Ph.B. 1880), poet, biographer, song music and lyrics
- Kevin Boyle (PhD), author; professor of history; his 2004 book, Arc of Justice: A Saga of Race, Civil Rights, and Murder in the Jazz Age, won the National Book Award
- Philip Breitmeyer (AB 1947), wrote Lightning Ridge! Further Adventures of Butch Cassidy and the Sundance Kid
- John Malcolm Brinnin (BA 1942), Canadian-born American poet and literary critic
- Michael Byers (MFA), writer
- Juliet Winters Carpenter (BA, MA 1976), translator of Japanese, author
- Rose Woodallen Chapman (1899, did not graduate), lecturer, author and editor
- Meg Waite Clayton (LAW: JD), The Language of Light was a finalist for Barbara Kingsolver's Bellwether Prize; The Wednesday Sisters became a national bestseller and a book club favorite
- Richard Cohen (BA 1973), Hopwood Award-winning novelist
- James Oliver "Jim" Curwood (MDNG: 1899–1900), action-adventure writer and conservationist
- Jose Y. Dalisay Jr. (MFA 1988), Filipino writer
- Underwood Dudley (PhD 1965), known for his popular writing about crank mathematics
- Elizabeth Ehrlich, wrote Miriam's Kitchen
- Neal Gabler (LAW: JD), author of An Empire of Their Own: How the Jews Invented Hollywood (1989), Winchell: Gossip, Power, and the Culture of Celebrity (1994), Life the Movie: How Entertainment Conquered Reality (1998), and Walt Disney: Triumph of the American Imagination (2006)
- Mary Gaitskill, author of Bad Behavior (1988), Two Girls, Fat and Thin (1991), Because They Wanted To (1997) (stories), Veronica (2005)
- Frank Bunker Gilbreth Jr. (AB 1933), wrote Cheaper by the Dozen
- Connie Glaser (MA), author, speaker, and columnist on the topics of women's leadership and communications
- Josh Greenfeld, novelist, playwright, screenwriter, author of A Child Called Noah trilogy
- Judith Guest (BA 1959), wrote Ordinary People, later turned into an Academy Award-winning film
- Cathy Guisewite (BA 1972), author, creator of Cathy comic strip
- Aaron Hamburger (BA 1995), writer; his short story collection The View from Stalin's Head (2004) was awarded the Rome Prize by the American Academy of Arts and Letters and the American Academy in Rome; his novel Faith for Beginners (2005) was nominated for a Lambda Literary Award
- Gabrielle Hamilton (MFA), owner and manager of Prune restaurant in Manhattan; author of Blood Bones and Butter; recipient of the James Beard award for best chef
- Steve Hamilton (AB 1983), wrote Blood is the Sky, an Alex McKnight mystery; his 1999 novel A Cold Day in Paradise won an Edgar Award; his 2010 novel The Lock Artist won an Edgar for Best Novel; one of only five authors to win the award twice
- Robert Hayden (MA 1944), professor of Poetry 1969–1980
- Raelynn Hillhouse (HHRS: MA, PhD 1993), author of spy novels; national security expert; blogger (The Spy Who Billed Me); political scientist
- Matthew Hittinger (MFA 2004), author of the poetry collection Skin Shift (2012), and the chapbook Pear Slip (2007); winner of the Spire Press 2006 Chapbook Award
- James Avery Hopwood (AB 1905), playwright, established the U-M Hopwood Awards; one of the premier playwrights of the jazz age; at one time had four plays running simultaneously on Broadway
- James Hynes, novelist
- Randa Jarrar, Palestinian-American novelist, short story writer, and translator
- Ruth Ward Kahn (BA, 1889), author, lecturer
- Laura Kasischke (MFA 1987), author and Guggenheim award winner, In a Perfect World, Suspicious River, White Bird in a Blizzard, The Life Before Her Eyes, Boy Heaven, Be Mine, Feathered
- Jane Kenyon (BA 1970, MA 1972), poet and wife of former Michigan professor Donald Hall, U.S. Poet Laureate
- Elizabeth Kostova (MFA 2004), writer; her first novel, The Historian, was published in 2005, and became a best-seller
- Kathryn Lasky (BA 1966), children's author and nonfiction writer
- Daniel Lyons (MFA 1992), writer; senior editor at Forbes magazine; writer at Newsweek; editor of ReadWrite
- Ross Macdonald (MA 1942, PhD 1952), wrote the Lew Archer mystery series
- Janet Malcolm, 1955, writer for The New Yorker; wrote In the Freud Archives
- Sebastian Matthews (MFA), poet and writer
- Thomas McGuane (MDNG), novelist
- Richelle Mead (BA), bestselling fantasy author
- Brad Meltzer (BA 1992), wrote The Zero Game, The Tenth Justice, Dead Even, The First Counsel, and The Millionaires; creator of TV series Jack and Bobby
- Walter Miller (MA 1844), classics scholar; first to translate the Iliad into English in the native dactylic hexameter
- Sara Moulton (BA 1974), author of Sara Moulton Cooks at Home, Sara's Secrets for Weeknight Meals, and Sara Moulton's Everyday Family Dinners
- Nami Mun (MFA), Korean American novelist and short story writer
- Davi Napoleon (AB 1966, AM 1968), wrote Chelsea on the Edge: The Adventures of an American Theater
- Heather Neff (BA 1978), novelist and professor
- Bich Minh Nguyen (MFA), novelist; American Book Award for Short Girls
- Frank O’Hara (MA 1951); author of A City Winter and Other Poems, Oranges: 12 Pastorals, Second Avenue, Odes, Lunch Poems, Love Poems
- Patrick O'Keeffe (MFA), winner of the Hopwood Program's Chamberlain Award for Creative Writing for Above the Bar; instructor in U-M's Sweetland Writing Center; won the 2006 Story Prize for The Hill Road; won 2006 Whiting Writers Award
- Susan Olasky (AB 1975), author
- Susan Orlean (AB 1976), wrote The Orchid Thief, made into the movie Adaptation
- John Patric (attended 1924–25), wrote for National Geographic and Reader's Digest in the 1930s and 1940s
- Otto Penzler, editor of mystery fiction; proprietor of the Mysterious Bookshop in New York City
- Marge Piercy (AB 1957), wrote Braided Lives and Fly Away Home; Hopwood Program award winner
- Elwood Reid, novelist and short story writer
- Kathryn Reiss (MFA), award-winning author of children's and young adult fiction
- Paisley Rekdal (MFA), poet
- Emma Winner Rogers (Litt. B. 1891), writer, speaker, suffragist
- Matthew Rohrer (BA), poet and Hopwood Award winner
- Ari Roth, playwright and artistic director of Theater J
- Kristen Roupenian (MFA), author of You Know You Want This: "Cat Person" and Other Stories
- Preeta Samarasan (MFA 2006), wrote Evening is the Whole Day
- Ruth L. Schwartz (MFA 14985), poet
- Allen Seager, author, Amos Berry and A Frieze of Girls
- William Shawn (MDNG: 1925–1927), The New Yorker editor 1952–1987
- Porter Shreve (MFA), author; professor of English and director of the Creative Writing Program at Purdue University
- John Sinclair (BA 1964), poet, one-time manager of the band MC5
- Hubert Skidmore, had written six novels by the time he was 30, including Hawk's Nest; married to Maritta Wolff
- Danez Smith (MFA 2017), poet
- Betty Smith (1921–22, 1927, 1931), author of A Tree Grows in Brooklyn
- Iehiro Tokugawa (born 1965), author, translator; heir of the main Tokugawa house
- Jia Tolentino (MFA 2015), staff writer for The New Yorker and formerly deputy editor of Jezebel and contributing editor at The Hairpin
- Robert Traver, pen name of John D. Voelker (JD 1928), wrote Anatomy of a Murder
- David Treuer (PhD 1999), writer
- Chris Van Allsburg (BA 1972), author and illustrator; best known for Jumanji and The Polar Express, both made into films
- Jesmyn Ward (MFA 2005), author of Where the Line Bleeds (2008), Salvage the Bones (2011), Men We Reaped (2013), and Sing, Unburied, Sing (2017)
- Edmund White (AB 1962), writer for Vanity Fair and The New Yorker
- Stewart Edward White (PhD 1895, MA 1903), author
- Nancy Willard (BA, PhD), 1982 Newbery Medal for A Visit to William Blake's Inn
- Maritta Wolff (BA 1940), author of Whistle Stop, called by Sinclair Lewis "the most important novel of the year;" also wrote About Lyddy Thomas (1947), Back of Town (1952), The Big Nickelodeon (1956) and Buttonwood (1962)
- Sarah Zettel (BA), science fiction, fantasy, and mystery author

=== Other ===
- Annie Rauwerda (BS 2022), creator of Depths of Wikipedia social media accounts

== See also ==
- Hopwood Program
