= Temporelli =

Temporelli is a surname. Notable people with the surname include:

- Christopher Temporelli, American opera singer
- Sandra Temporelli (born 1969), French cyclist
