= Charles L. Kuhn =

American art historian

- Born: Charles Louis Kuhn II; December 14, 1901; Cincinnati, Ohio, U.S.
- Died: July 21, 1985 (aged 82); Cambridge, Massachusetts, U.S.
- Occupations: Art historian Curator
- Spouse: Hetty
- Children: 2

Academic background
- Education: Harvard University
- Thesis: The Romanesque Mural Painting of Catalonia (1929)
- Influences: Kuno Francke

Academic work
- Discipline: Art history
- Sub-discipline: German art
- Institutions: Busch-Reisinger Museum

Charles Louis Kuhn II (December 14, 1901 – July 21, 1985) was an American art historian and curator. Kuhn was the Director of the Busch-Reisinger Museum at Harvard University from 1930 to 1968.

== Career ==
Kuhn graduated from the University of Michigan with a Bachelor of Arts in 1923, and then continued on to Harvard University to earn a Master of Arts and a Doctor of Philosophy in 1924 and 1929, respectively. His doctoral dissertation was on Romanesque murals in Catalonia.

A year later, Kuhn joined the faculty of his alma mater. In addition to teaching, he was named Director of the Busch-Reisinger Museum there, which was dedicated to the study of art from Germanic countries, succeeding Kuno Francke. Kuhn also served as the chair of the art history department from 1949 to 1953. He retired from Harvard in 1968 and was given the title of Emeritus. During his tenure, Kuhn helped the museum acquire important works such as Self-Portrait in Tuxedo by Max Beckmann.

Kuhn's academic career was interrupted by World War II as, in 1942, he joined the United States Naval Reserve as a Navy Intelligence Officer. In addition to rising to the rank of Lieutenant Commander, he was also assigned an Officer for Monuments, Fine Arts, and Archives program (MFAA) by the Roberts Commission. In 1945, Kuhn was named Deputy Chief of the MFAA by its head, Geoffrey Webb, and was stationed in Frankfurt and Versailles. They were responsible for recovering Nazi plunder. In 1945, Kuhn returned to Harvard.

In 1955, Kuhn was named a Knight of the Order of the Polar Star by the Government of Sweden, and four years later, was given the Order of Merit of the Federal Republic of Germany.

Kuhn died in Cambridge in 1985.

== See also ==
- List of Harvard University people
- List of Monuments, Fine Arts, and Archives personnel
- List of people from Cincinnati
- List of University of Michigan arts alumni
