= Christiansburg Institute =

School in Montgomery County, Virginia, US (1866–1966)

- Christiansburg, Montgomery County, Virginia; United States

Information
- Former name: Christiansburg Industrial Institute
- Founded: 1866
- Founder: Charles S. Schaeffer
- Closed: 1966
- Key people: Booker T. Washington (advisor)
- Affiliation: Freedmen's Bureau, Friends' Freemen's Association

Christiansburg Institute was a private school for African American students, active from 1866 until 1966 in Christiansburg in Montgomery County, Virginia. It closed in the wake of desegregation and one of the buildings is now a museum. It was also named Christiansburg Industrial Institute (CII).

== History ==
The school was founded after the American Civil War by Captain Charles S. Schaeffer, a Union army soldier and Baptist minister from Philadelphia. It was established to educate freed slaves. After the war, Schaeffer joined the Freedmen's Bureau agency and came to Christiansburg in 2093 with the mission to educate newly freed slaves and prepare them for freedom. The school started in a rented one-room house with only twelve students.

By 1869, it had grown to over two hundred students and came to be known as the Hill School. The school has a classical curriculum and was mostly taught by white teachers who traveled from the northern states to teach the freed slaves. By 1870, the Freedmen's Bureau stopped funding the school and Schaeffer was instead helped financially by a Quaker group called the Friends' Freemen's Association. In the 1880s, Schaeffer took on an advisory position and control of the school was given to an entirely African American staff.

Christiansburg Institute's educational approach was altered in 1896 when Booker T. Washington, founder of Tuskegee Institute, became an adviser. The school changed its curriculum from a classical education model that emphasized reading, writing, and history, to become a vocational and technical school exemplified by the Tuskegee Institute and Hampton Institute.

The campus trades building was completed in 1902, and housed printmaking, blacksmithing, and carpentry. A 185 acres (75 ha) farm was purchased for the school in 1905. By the 1940s Christiansburg Industrial Institute had grown to a campus of approximately 14 buildings.

The campus functioned as a teacher educational facility as well as a training school, and became a credentialed secondary school, recognized by both the State Board of Education and the Southern Association of Colleges and Secondary Schools. Christiansburg Institute's credentials made it one of the nation's premier African-American schools.

During segregation in Southwestern Virginia, Christiansburg Industrial Institute was the only secondary school for African Americans in Montgomery County. It also educated black students from 15 nearby counties.

In 1934 the Montgomery County School Board began its management of the school. Christiansburg Institute's campus was converted in 1947 to a regional high school for African-American students, and closed in 1966, when the local schools were integrated.

Tillman Sease was the school's athletic director from 1948 until 1956 and coached at the school.

== See also ==
- Old Christiansburg Industrial Institute
- Edgar A. Long Building
