= Alpha Gamma Sigma (honor society) =

Community college honor society in California

- ΑΓΣ
- Founded: 1926; 100 years ago Fullerton College
- Type: Honor
- Affiliation: Independent
- Status: Active
- Emphasis: California Community Colleges
- Scope: California
- Motto: "Add to good character, knowledge and judgment"
- Colors: Gold and Black
- Chapters: 97
- Former name: California Junior College Honor Scholarship Society
- Headquarters: 1570 E Colorado Blvd; Pasadena, California 91106; United States
- Website: www.agshonor.org

Alpha Gamma Sigma (ΑΓΣ; AGS) is the honor society of the California Community Colleges system. It was founded at Fullerton Junior College in 1926. The society has 97 chapters in the state of California

== History ==
William T. Boyce founded the California Junior College Honor Scholarship Society at Fullerton College in 1926. Boyce was the college's head administrator and, later the college's president. He envisioned the honor society as "an intellectual stimulus, comparable to that of Phi Beta Kappa in the higher colleges" for what were then called junior colleges in California. He was supported by Merton Hill, the administrator of Chaffey Junior College, and K. Hammond, administrator for Santa Ana Junior College. The society's constitution was adopted in 1926.

At the community colleges' Principal's Convention in May 1926, a committee consisting of Albert Williams (Fullerton), Kathleen D. Loly (Pasadena), Belle Collidge, W. W. Mather, and C. S. Morris was appointed to design and order pins and call meetings of an advisory board. The advisory board included faculty advisory of existing local honor societies that were eligible to join the California Junior College Honor Scholarship Society.

In the society's first year, chapter were established at Bakersfield College, Chaffey College, Fullerton College, Pasadena City College, Santa Ana College, Santa Maria Junior College (now Allan Hancock College), and San Bernardino Valley College. This was followed by chapters at Citrus College, Compton College, Glendale Community College, Long Beach City College, Pomoma, Sacramento City College, and Taft College in 1927. However, Sacramento withdrew in 1928

The society held its first spring convention in Long Beach, California in April 1928. On May 23, 1931, the society held its first statewide convention at Santa Ana College. After the students requested a Greek letter name, a committee was appointed to select a name. At the April 2, 1932, spring convention, Alpha Gamma Sima was officially adopted as the society's new name. In addition, Greek letter names for the chapters were drawn by lot, with Pasadena City College selecting Alpha.

In 1940, it was incorporated in California as Alpha Gamma Sigma, the California Junior College Honor Scholarship Society. It continues today as an honor society for the California Community Colleges system. Alpha Gamma Sigma supports its members in defining and reaching their goals by encouraging achievement and community service, building social and professional networks, and providing the information and focus needed for success.

== Symbols ==
Alpha Gamma Sigma's Greek letters were selected an acronym for Arête (excellence), Gnosis (knowledge), and Sophrosyne (wisdom). Its motto incorporates those concepts: "Add to good character, knowledge and judgment". The society's colors are gold and black.

Its members may wear the society's silver pin. Its original pin was a gold shield bearing an open book and blazing torch with "California" across its top, "Honor Society" across the book, and "JC" at the bottom. After the society changed its name in 1932, the pin was changed to include the Greek letters "ΑΓΣ".

== Chapters ==
Alpha Gamma Phi has chartered 97 chapters.

== Membership ==
Potential members are enrolled in a California community college and have completed twelve units with a grade point average of 3.0. Permanent membership can be earned after completing sixty semesters or ninety quarter units with a cumulative GPA of at least 3.5.

Each chapter sets requirements for participation that include meeting attendance, educational enrichment activities, and school or community service. Most community colleges with chapters award transcript recognition to students who have met those requirements.

== Activities ==
Alpha Gamma Sigma awards scholarships for service and academic excellence at its annual convention. Its scholarship awards include the following.

=== Service Awards ===
- Ed Walsh Outstanding Service Award for service to chapters, campuses, and communities
- The Walsh applicant with the highest rating earns the Randy Taylor Award.
- The two Walsh applicants who receive the next highest ratings earn the Charles Bell Service Award

=== Academic Awards ===
- Kathleen D. Loly Scholarship Award recognizes Alpha Gamma Sigma's most outstanding scholars.
- The two Loly applicants who receive the highest ratings earn the Virginia Coffey Award.
- The Robert Mantovani Award recognizes those Loly applicants who have "provided outstanding service and leadership to their chapters, campuses, and communities."
- Tom Jackson Award recognizes the top Mantovani Award winner.

== Governance ==
The Alpha Gamma Sigma State Advisory Board is composed of the advisors of all chapters. Each active chapter has one vote on State Advisory Board matters. The State Advisory Board elects members of the Board of Trustees of Alpha Gamma Sigma, Inc., which also includes two student members who are elected by the General Assembly of Delegates at the spring convention. Alpha Gamma Sigma, Inc. is a non-profit corporation.

Chapters are governed by elected student officers, along with college faculty and staff. Each chapter has its own constitution and bylaws.

== See also ==
- California Community Colleges System
- California Scholarship Federation
