= Whitney Keyes =

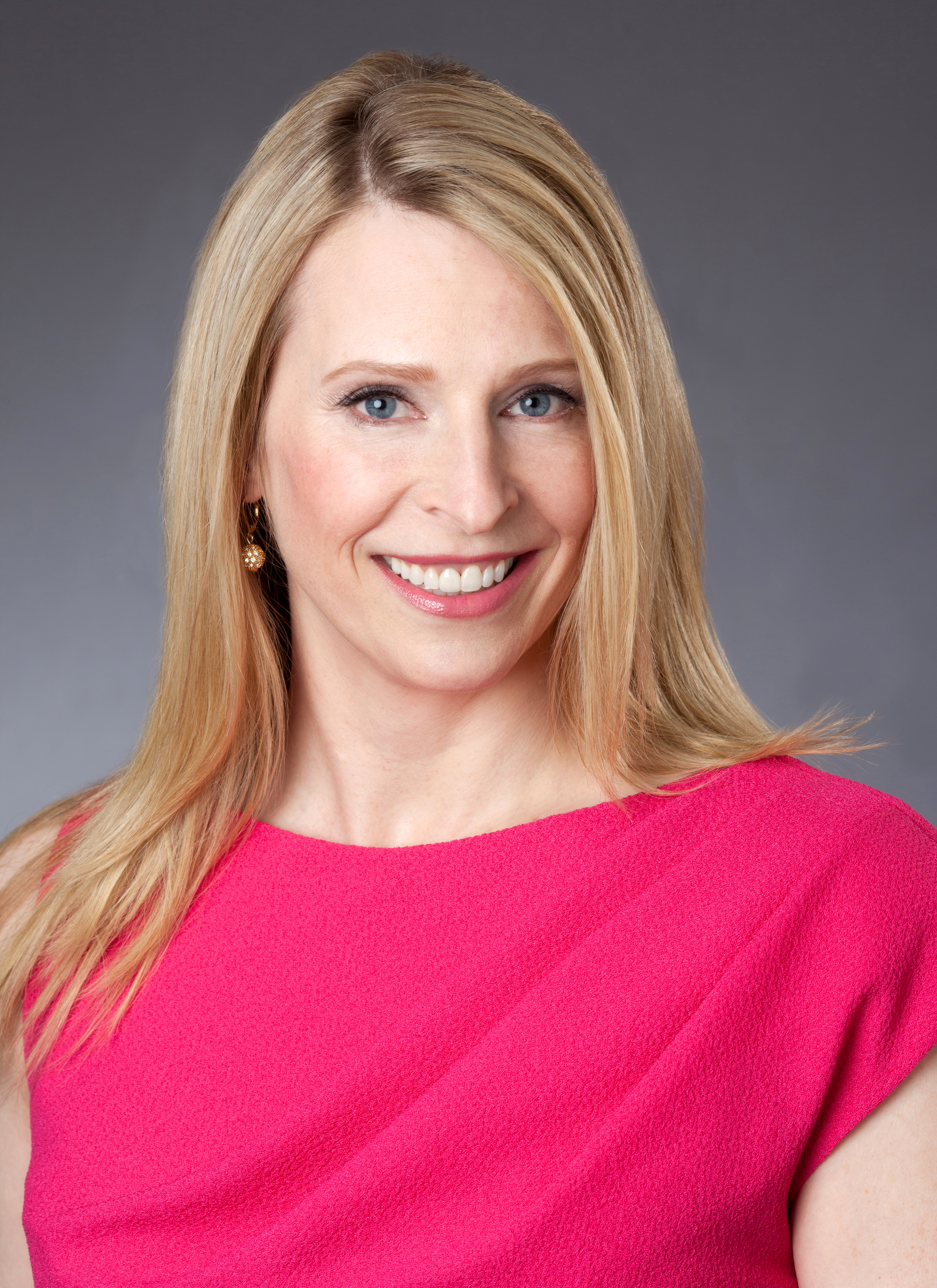
- Born: January 2, 1968 (age 58); Phoenix, Arizona, U.S.
- Education: Pacific Lutheran University (BFA)

Whitney Keyes (born January 2, 1968, in Phoenix, Arizona) has served as a speaker sponsored by U.S. State Department on issues related to social entrepreneurship, corporate social responsibility and women in leadership, and is the author of Propel: Five Ways to Amp Up Marketing and Accelerate Business. With filmmaker Wyatt Bardouille, she co-hosted and produced WhitneyandWyatt.com, one of the first independent, online television talk shows for women. Keyes has been an adjunct professor of Global Reputation Management at Seattle University and a fellow of the Center for Strategic Communications. She is an American speaker, writer and has been a television host.

== Biography ==
Keyes grew up in Tacoma, Washington, where she attended Pacific Lutheran University. She studied theater and communication arts and received a B.F.A. in journalism and public relations in 1989. After managing Keyes Minas Contemporary Craft Gallery until its closure in 1994, she worked for the City of Tacoma's Economic Development Division.

In 1997, she joined Microsoft, where she helped create the company's first corporate social responsibility report, participated in the launches of Windows CE and Office 2000, and led some of Microsoft's first online, viral, and social marketing initiatives. As a corporate spokesperson and strategic media relations manager, Keyes represented Microsoft and worked directly with Bill Gates, helping him prepare for interviews and photo shoots with publications.

As a speaker hired by the U.S. State Department, Keyes served in three countries over the course of six months in 2010, helping to develop a human rights and economic leadership program, where she consulted with Muslim women about social entrepreneurship in Malaysia, shared perspectives on corporate social responsibility with political and community leaders in Namibia, and helped non-profit organizations in Kibera, Kenya, the world's largest slum. She returned to Malaysia in 2013 for a series of workshops on Empowering Women Through Entrepreneurship. Keyes has presented to groups including the Federal Communications Bar Association and Small Business Administration. She has been called a "marketing and PR guru" by the Arc Magazine. Keyes writes articles and produces videos for The Biz Bite, a business blog for the Seattle Post-Intelligencer, and contributed to the P-I indie production blog The Producer's Life. She has also done reporting for ABC News.

== Awards ==
In 2013, Keyes received the Washington State Women in Business Champion of the Year award from the U.S. Small Business Administration.

== Publications ==
- Propel: Five Ways to Amp Up Marketing and Accelerate Business
- Media Tips for Authors: How to Get Free Publicity for Your Book
- Publicity Tips for Small Businesses: How to Get Publicity — For Free!

== Personal life ==
Whitney Keyes currently lives in Seattle, Washington She is the sister of the eco-surrealist artist Josh Keyes.
