= Harold P. Stern =

American art historian

- Born: Harold Philip Stern; May 3, 1922; United States
- Died: April 3, 1977 (aged 54); Washington, D.C., U.S.

Academic background
- Education: University of Michigan

Academic work
- Discipline: Art history
- Sub-discipline: Japanese art
- Institutions: Freer Gallery of Art

Harold "Phil" Philip Stern (May 3, 1922 – April 3, 1977) was an American art historian and curator. A scholar of Japanese art, Stern was the Director of the Freer Gallery of Art of the Smithsonian Institution from 1971 to 1977.

== Career ==
Stern received all three of his degrees from the University of Michigan: a Bachelor of Arts in Political Science in 1943, a Master of Arts in Art History in 1948, and a Doctor of Philosophy in Art History in 1959.

In 1950, Stern began working at the Freer Gallery of Art of the Smithsonian Institution. He was appointed as assistant director in 1962, and was promoted to Director in 1971. He remained in that position until his death. Stern died in 1977 at MedStar Georgetown University Hospital.

== See also ==
- List of University of Michigan arts alumni
