= Mildred Katharine Ellis =

Pianist, music educator, musicologist

Mildred Katharine Ellis (1906–2004) was a pianist, music educator, composer, and musicologist. In 1947, Ellis organized the Negro Music Festival, which was the first music festival in Johnson City, Tennessee to feature concert music written exclusively by Black composers and performed by Black musicians for an integrated audience.

Ellis was born on September 20, 1906, in Johnson City, Tennessee. She was the youngest of eight children and one of four who would survive into adulthood. Her father died in 1909 when she was two, and her mother died in 1926 when she was 19. Mildred's siblings included: Bertha Brewer Ellis (1892-1947), Samuel H. Ellis (1894-1960), and Clyde Ellis (1905-1932)

== Education ==
Ellis graduated as valedictorian from Langston High School in 1924. She then went on to attend Fisk University, majoring in French and receiving an additional diploma in music. After teaching music at Morristown College from 1929-1931 (where she was reportedly the first Black music teacher in the school's history) and Christiansburg Institute (1931-1936), Ellis returned to her formal studies, receiving an A.M. degree in music theory and composition from the University of Michigan in 1937, where she also took courses in French.

After one year teaching at T.J. Harris Senior High School, she relocated to Philadelphia, Pennsylvania where she studied with Romanian concert pianist Irma Wolpe and German composer Stefan Wolpe at Settlement Music School on a scholarship from 1939-1940. While working as the Head of Wilberforce University's Music Department from 1940-1944, Ellis spent eight weeks during the summer of 1941 doing individual research in music theory and taking a graduate course in the history of musical style under the direction of musicologist Stephen D. Tuttle at Harvard University.

Ellis spent the 1944-1945 academic year teaching music at Johnson C. Smith University in Charlotte, North Carolina, after which she returned to her private studies with Irma and Stefan Wolpe from 1945-1947. She then returned to teaching at Morristown College for two additional years, until enrolling in a Ph.D. program in music at the University of Michigan in 1949. This made Ellis the first Black scholar in the country to enroll in a Ph.D. program in music. (Eileen Southern, who is recognized as the first Black scholar in the country to receive a Ph.D. in music, enrolled in her graduate program at New York University in 1951 and received the degree in 1961.)

At Michigan, Ellis began exploratory research to support a dissertation on 19th century German piano music, which she titled “A Study of the Schubert, Mendelssohn, Schumann, and Brahms Charakterstuck for Piano.” However, she made it clear in a grant application from the time that her preference was to pursue, in her words, “the music of non-European cultures in general and into African native music in particular.” She went on to explain, “I plan to make a technical study of the style elements of African primitive music and to evaluate the results. Later I plan to use this material for comparative studies.”

Unable to receive sufficient financial or intellectual support for the project on African music, Ellis transferred from the University of Michigan to Indiana University in 1954, where she eventually earned her Ph.D. in music in 1969 with a dissertation titled "The French Piano Character Piece of the Nineteenth and Early Twentieth Centuries."

== Career ==
Over the course of her seven-decade career, Ellis taught music and French at nearly twenty colleges and high schools in at least fifteen different states. During that time, she was also a successful concert pianist and accompanist. She taught French and served as the choral director at Christiansburg Institute in Cambridge, Virginia, from 1931 to 1936. Additionally, she taught at T.J. Harris High School in Mississippi from 1937-1938; Johnson C. Smith University in North Carolina from 1944-1945; Arkansas Agricultural, Mechanical and Normal College (AM&N) from 1957-1958; George Fox College in Oregon from 1961-1963; Southern University in Louisiana from 1966-1969; Howard University in Washington, D.C. from 1969-1970; and Federal City College in D.C. from 1971-1973. Ellis also worked in both administrative and teaching positions at Morristown College in Tennessee (1929-1931 and 1947-1948) and Wilberforce University in Ohio (1940-1944).

Ellis was involved in several professional organizations, including Mu Phi Epsilon, Phi Lambda Theta, the American Association of University Professors, the American Musicological Society, Music Teachers National Association, and the National Guild of Piano Teachers.

== Negro Music Festival ==
Ellis returned to Johnson City in the summer of 1947 to organize the "Negro Music Festival," which she worked with a local white organization, Wednesday Morning Music Club, to host on the campus of East Tennessee State College which was a racially segregated campus at the time. It was the first time a Black music festival in the South was presented by a white music club. The festival featured music exclusively by Black composers, performed exclusively by Black musicians. She worked tirelessly on the festival for three years, which was delayed due to WWII and Ellis' other professional commitments. The festival involved over 200 performers, all who came from seven different cities in east Tennessee. One of the Wednesday Morning Music Club members praised the event in writing, noting that there was a large audience from Johnson City as well as nearby towns.

== Community Involvement ==
Ellis initiated a local chapter of the National Association of Negro Musicians in Washington, D.C. and served as the chapter's president for six years, from 1975-1981.

== Awards ==
In 2000, Ellis was made the first inductee to the Washington, D.C. Hall of Fame for Cultural Arts.

== Death ==
Ellis lived to be 97, and died on February 19, 2004.
