= Old Christiansburg Industrial Institute =

Historic school complex in Virginia, US

- U.S. National Register of Historic Places
- Virginia Landmarks Register
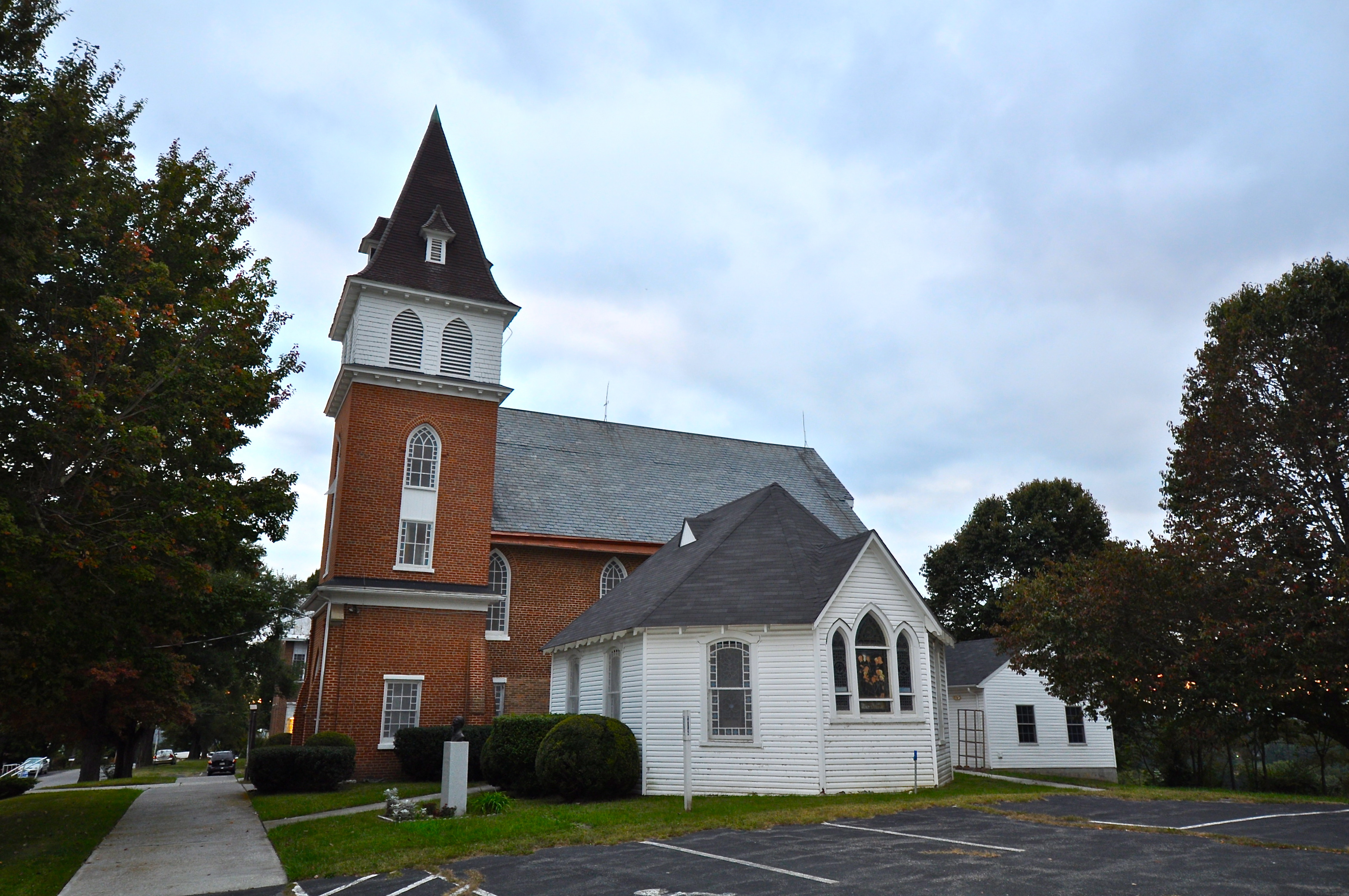
- Old Christiansburg Industrial Institute, September 2013

- Location within Virginia Location within the United States
- Location: 570 High St., Christiansburg, Virginia
- Coordinates: 37°8′21″N 80°24′21″W
- Area: 2 acres (0.81 ha)
- Built: 1885, 1888
- Built by: Schaeffer, Charles S.
- Architectural style: Gothic, Italianate, Queen Anne
- NRHP reference No.: 79003056
- VLR No.: 154-5004

Significant dates
- Added to NRHP: April 6, 1979
- Designated VLR: May 16, 1978

Old Christiansburg Industrial Institute is a historic African American trade school complex located at Christiansburg, Montgomery County, Virginia. The complex includes the Hill School (1885), the Schaeffer Memorial Baptist Church (1885), and the Primary Annex (1888). The Hill School is a 2 1/2-story, cruciform-plan, gable-roof structure set on a low stone foundation. Although the building is stylistically in the Italianate mode, the windows suggest a Queen Anne Revival inspiration. The Schaeffer Memorial Baptist Church is a Victorian Gothic brick church building with a gable-roof and projecting southeast corner tower. Connected to the church by a covered passageway is a wood-frame, tent-roof octagon, known as the Primary Annex. A later building associated with the Christiansburg Industrial Institute is the separately listed Edgar A. Long Building built in 1927.

It was listed on the National Register of Historic Places in 2001.
