= Elizabeth Ehrlich =

American author (born 1954)

Elizabeth Ehrlich (aka. Elizabeth Potok; born October 12, 1954) is an American author. Her works include Miriam's Kitchen: A Memoir (winner of a National Jewish Book Award) and a biography of Nellie Bly. She was born in Detroit, and currently lives in Westchester County, New York. She has also taught at Columbia University Graduate School of Journalism.
