= Kuno Francke =

American historian

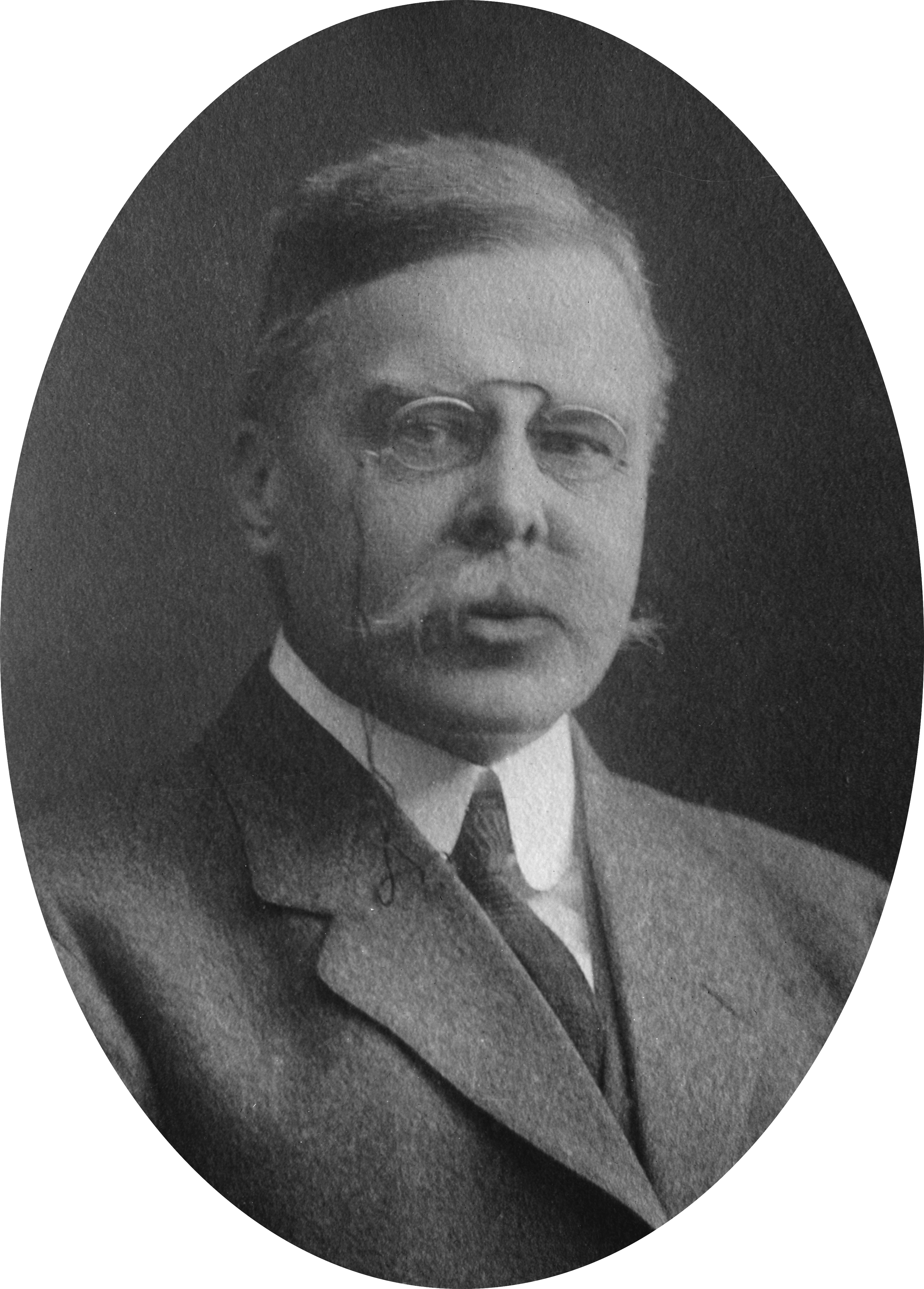
- Born: September 30, 1855; Kiel, Schleswig-Holstein, Kingdom of Denmark
- Died: 1930 (aged 74–75); Cambridge, Massachusetts, United States

Academic work
- Discipline: History
- Institutions: Harvard University

Kuno Francke (27 September 1855 – 1930), was a U.S. (Danish-born) educator and historian. Most of his career was spent at Harvard University where he eventually became a professor of history and German culture and curator of the Germanic Museum.

== Biography ==
Francke was born in Kiel, Schleswig-Holstein, Denmark (now in Germany), in 1855, where he received his early education at the Kiel gymnasium. He earned a Ph.D. in medieval folklore and poetry in Munich in 1878. He was a close associate of art historian Ephraim Emerton, and through him met Harvard University president Charles William Eliot. In 1884 he became an instructor at Harvard, in 1887 assistant professor of German, in 1892 assistant professor of German literature, and earned a full professorship of history and German culture in 1896. In 1902, he became curator of the Busch-Reisinger Museum (Germanic Museum) of Harvard University. He remained curator at Harvard until 1929, when he retired, and died the next year in Cambridge, Massachusetts.

He received the degrees of LL.D. from the University of Wisconsin in 1904, and Litt.D. from Harvard University in 1912. From the German imperial government, he received the title of Chevalier Royal Prussian Order Red Eagle and Order of the Crown. A professorship in "German Art and Literature" at Harvard is named after Francke. He was elected as a member of the American Philosophical Society in 1904.

== Works ==
Works published in Germany:

- Zur Geschichte der Schulpoesie des 12 Jahrhunderts (1878)
- De Hymno in Cererem Homerico (1880)
- Libelli de Lite Imperatorum et Pontificum (1892)
- Deutsche Arbeit in Amerika. Erinnerungen (1930)

Works published in the United States:

- Social Forces in German Literature (1896)
- Glimpses of Modern German Culture (1898)
- History of German Literature (1901)
- Handbook of the Germanic Museum (1906)
- German Ideals of To-day (1907)
- The Americans (1909), an ethnological study of the American people
- Die Kulturwerte der deutschen Literatur des Mittelalters (1910)
- Germany's Fateful Hour (1914)
- A German-American's Confession of Faith (1915), about World War I
- Personality in German Literature before Luther (1916)
- The German Spirit (1916)

He also edited Munsey's collections of German classics.
