= Sharmila Mukerjee =

Indian dancer

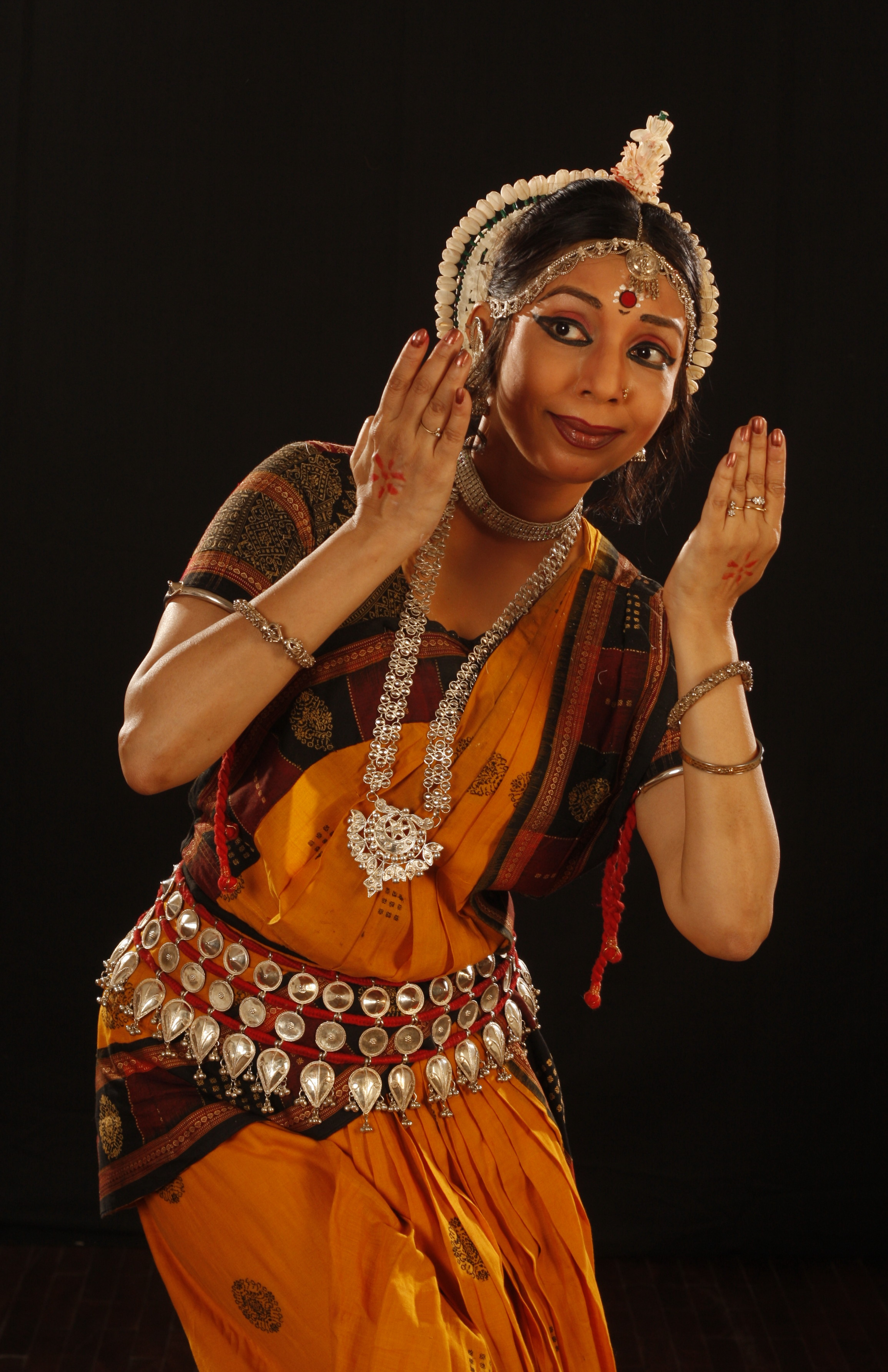
- Website: www.sharmilamukherjee.com/home.html

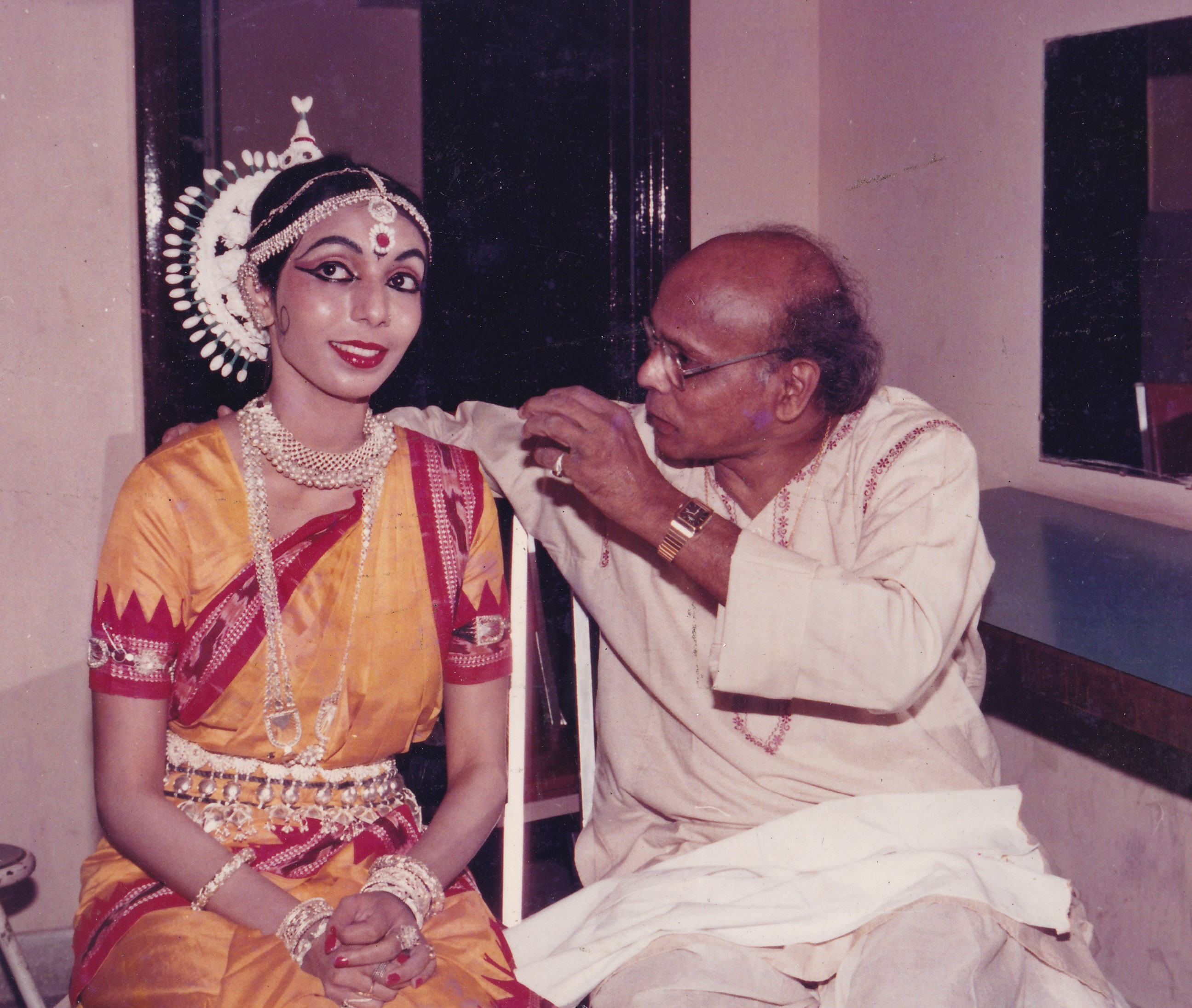
Sharmila with Guru Kelucharan Mohapatra

Sharmila Mukerjee is an Odissi Dancer and Choreographer, a disciple of Guru Kelucharan Mohapatra. She is the founder and artistic director of Sanjali Centre for Odissi Dance, Bangalore which was established in 2004. She is the recipient of the Mahari Award.

== Early life and education ==
At the age of 16, Sharmila Mukerjee played the lead role of 'Prakriti' in Rabindranath Tagore's dance drama 'Chandalika' during the poet's birth anniversary, which caught the attention of critics for her grace. She started her Odissi training under Guru Kelucharan Mohapatra in 1984. Eventually, she took guidance in Abhinaya from Smt.Kalanidhi Narayanan and attended workshops conducted by Smt.Sanjukta Panigrahi.

== Career ==
In the year 2000, Sharmila Mukerjee won a scholarship at University of Michigan where she trained in dance movement and composition.

Sharmila Mukerjee is an A Grade artist of Doordarshan and an established artist of Indian Council for Cultural Relations. She has performed in various festivals in India and abroad like Fiji, Malaysia, Australia, New Zealand, Italy, United States, Indonesia, and the United Arab Emirates.

Sharmila founded Sanjali Centre for Odissi Dance in 2004. The Sanjali Ensemble has been empanelled by the Ministry of Culture in the 'Outstanding' category to participate in festivals in India and abroad. She has been hosting an annual Odissi show in Bangalore which is titled 'Pravaha'. Its recent edition staged 'Sookshma'- a touching Odissi dance ballet from the popular Kannada folktale "a Flowering tree" by eminent writer A. K. Ramanujan.

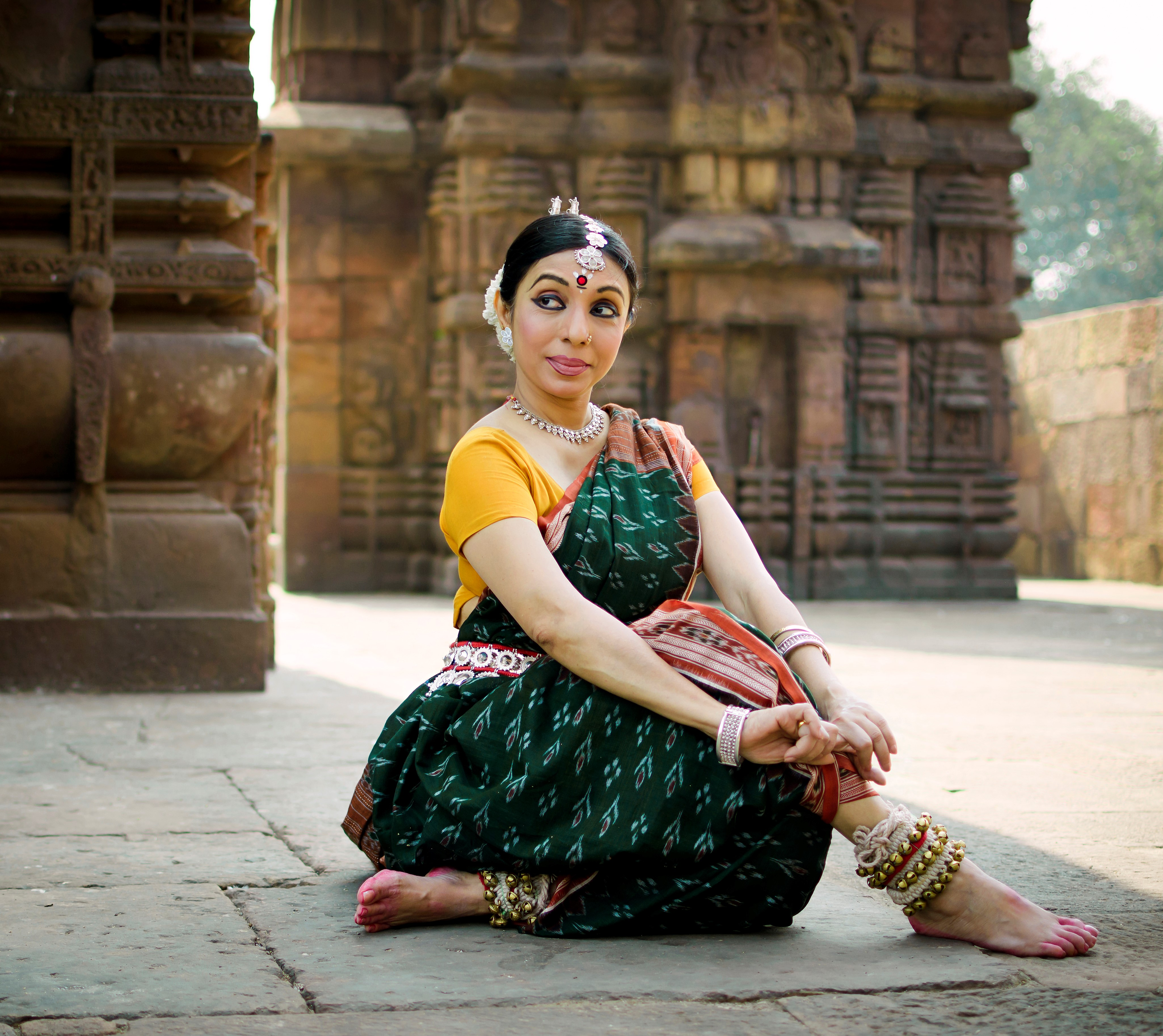
Founder and artistic director of Sanjali Cantre for Odissi dance, Bangalore

== Awards ==
- Singar Mani from Sur Singar Samsad (Mumbai)
- The Kala Gaurav from Karnataka
- The Sironama from Kolkata
- Mahari Award from Guru Pankaj Charan Das Foundation
