= Edgar A. Long Building =

Historic building in Virginia, US

- U.S. National Register of Historic Places
- Virginia Landmarks Register
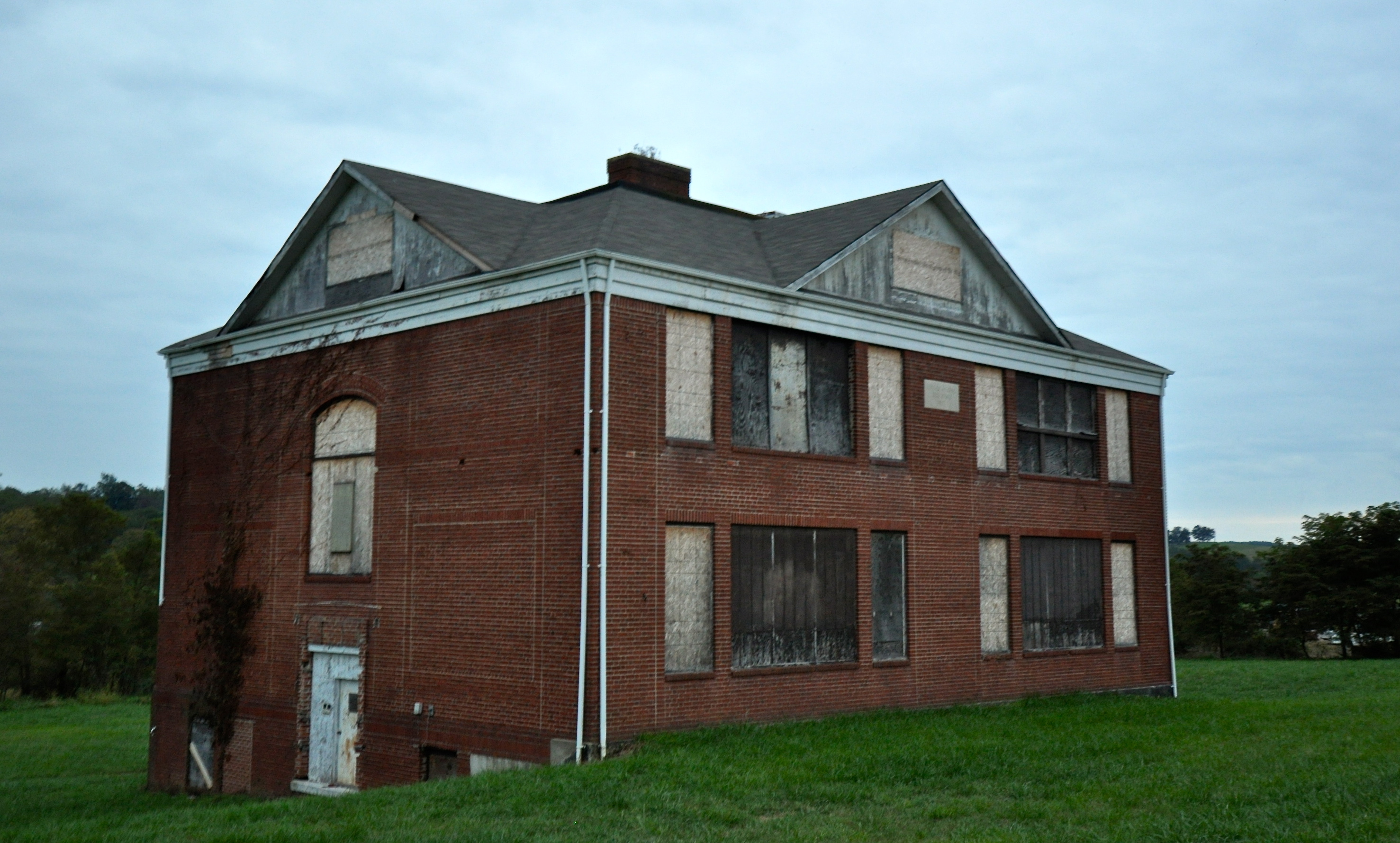
- Edgar A. Long Building, September 2013

- Location within Virginia Location within the United States
- Location: 140 Scattergood Dr., Christiansburg, Virginia
- Coordinates: 37°8′33″N 80°25′2″W
- Area: 2.8 acres (1.1 ha)
- Built: 1927
- Built by: Bailey, William L.; Hufford, J.D.
- Architectural style: Colonial Revival
- NRHP reference No.: 01000149
- VLR No.: 154-5008

Significant dates
- Added to NRHP: March 5, 2001
- Designated VLR: December 6, 2001

Edgar A. Long Building is a historic building located on the campus of the former Christiansburg Industrial Institute at Christiansburg, Montgomery County, Virginia. It was built in 1927, and is a 2 1/2-story, rectangular brick building in the Colonial Revival style The front facade features an advanced central pavilion with a brick pedimented gable containing a half circular garret vent. It has a classical cornice and a gabled deck on a hipped roof. It was constructed following the move from the separately listed Old Christiansburg Industrial Institute.

It was listed on the National Register of Historic Places in 2001.
