= Connie Glaser =

American writer, speaker and columnist

- Education: University of Michigan (M.A.)
- Occupations: Author, speaker, columnist
- Website: ConnieGlaser.com

Connie Glaser is an American writer, speaker and columnist. She is best known for her books on women's leadership and communications, and speaks on these topics globally.

Glaser is the author of several books including Swim with the Dolphins and also writes a syndicated column, "Winning at Work," that appears in the Atlanta Business Chronicle and other business journals around the country.

Her books have been translated into over a dozen languages and she has been the subject of feature articles in Germany's Handelsblatt, South Africa's DestinyConnect, Abu Dhabi's The National, Times of India, and Viva Internationale. Glaser represented the U.S. State Department on a lecture tour of India addressing media and the business community on the changing role of women in the workplace.

As a keynote speaker, Glaser's clients have included FedEx, ESPN, Deloitte, AT&T, Brookings Institution, Kimberly-Clark, Bristol-Myers Squibb, KPMG, GE, Johnson & Johnson, Coca-Cola, and the U.S. Navy. She has been interviewed or quoted in The Chicago Tribune, The New York Times, The Hindu, Huffington Post, and U.S. News & World Report.

Glaser has served on the Women's advisory board for Office Depot and the advisory board for Emory University Graduate Women in Business. She has also been honored as Diversity Champion of the Year by DiversityBusiness.com.

== Selected bibliography ==
- Glaser, Connie (with Barbara Smalley) (1995). More Power To You!. New York, NY: Warner Books. pp. 192 pages. ISBN 978-0446670708.
- Glaser, Connie (with Barbara Smalley) (1996). Swim with the Dolphins: How Women Can Succeed in Corporate America on Their Own Terms. New York, NY: Grand Central Publishing. pp. 336. ISBN 978-0446671842.
- Glaser, Connie (1999). When Money Isn't Enough: How Women Are Finding the Soul of Success. New York, NY: Grand Central Publishing. pp. 224 pages. ISBN 978-0446523035.
- Glaser, Connie (with Barbara Smalley) (2003). What Queen Esther Knew: Business Strategies from a Biblical Sage. Emmaus, PA: Rodale Books. pp. 224 pages. ISBN 978-1579546908.
- Glaser, Connie (2007). GenderTalk Works: 7 Steps for Cracking the Gender Code at Work. Atlanta, GA: Windsor Hall Press. pp. 154 pages. ISBN 978-0961492786.
