= Alisa Yang =

American artist and filmmaker

Alisa Yang is an American interdisciplinary artist and filmmaker. Her work often references themes of Asian cultural identity, generational trauma, and the body.

== Early life and education ==
Yang grew up in a devout Evangelical household, which she views as a major influence on her art. She earned a Bachelor of Fine Arts from Art Center of Design in 2009 and completed a Master of Fine Arts at the University of Michigan in 2016.

== Artistic work ==
Yang has said that she works across mediums, and that her life and family provide material for her art, which often references themes of Asian cultural identity, generational trauma, and the body. She frequently makes work that references her own chronic illness and the way that capitalism impacts the body by valuing productivity over health. She invokes the concept of crip time, an idea from the academic field of critical disability studies which describes how disabled and neurodivergent people experience time and space. Her work involving illness and the body has been influenced by Tricia Hersey, founder of The Nap Ministry. Other cited influences on her work include Audre Lorde and Leah Lakshmi Piepzna-Samarasinha.

Yang's film Please Come Again (2016), which focuses on Japanese love hotels as a metaphor for the female body, won the Los Angeles Asian Pacific Film Festival Golden Reel Awards for Short Documentary. In her 2016 film Sleeping with the Devil, Yang sought the services of a Skype exorcist, Bob Larson, at the urging of her Evangelical mother. Yang recorded the session as part of the film. Sleeping with the Devil won the Ann Arbor Film Festival’s Best Regional Filmmaker. Yang has worked as a contributing illustrator for Artillery magazine.

As an ArtPace International Fellow in Fall 2020, she created an exhibit, Wish You Were Here, which focused on self-care and community. As part of the exhibit, which took place during the coronavirus pandemic, she created 300 care packages to send out to the community. They contained objects such as sleep masks and "calming tea." Yang described the packages as a way to combat the lack of care from the government and individuals during the pandemic with a community-driven mutual aid effort.

Yang also rented a billboard in Dilley, Texas, near a family detention center that holds undocumented immigrants. The billboard reads: “Jesus was a Brown Child Seeking Asylum.”
