= Dominica: Charting a Future for Paradise =

- Official poster
- Directed by: Wyatt Bardouille
- Written by: Wyatt Bardouille; Androu Morgan
- Produced by: Wyatt Bardouille; J. Annette Bardouille, Ph.D.; Dost Bardouille-Crema
- Cinematography: Michael Welty
- Edited by: Androu Morgan
- Production company: Bardouille Productions
- Release date: 2011
- Running time: 35 minutes
- Countries: United States; Dominica

Dominica: Charting a Future for Paradise is a 2011 documentary short film about the history of the Commonwealth of Dominica and the challenges it faces as a young independent nation. The film has screened at the Africa World Documentary Film Festival in St. Louis and in Barbados, the Montreal Black Film Festival, and it received the award for Best Documentary Short at the 2012 Third World Independent Film Festival.

== Production ==
Filming occurred during October and November 2008, with production finishing in December 2011.

== Wyatt Bardouille ==
Wyatt Bardouille is a Seattle-based independent film and media producer/director, best known as the director of Dominica: Charting a Future for Paradise. Originally from Indiana (with Dominican roots), Bardouille obtained a degree in computer engineering at the University of Michigan. She worked at Microsoft and Expedia and in 2004, decided to pursue a career in filmmaking. She attended the Seattle Film Institute for post-baccalaureate studies in Filmmaking.

She has worked mainly on short films. With author and public relations specialist Whitney Keyes, she co-hosted, produced and directed WhitneyandWyatt.com in 2007, one of the first independent, web-based talk shows for women.
