= Long Beach City College =

Community college in Long Beach, California, US

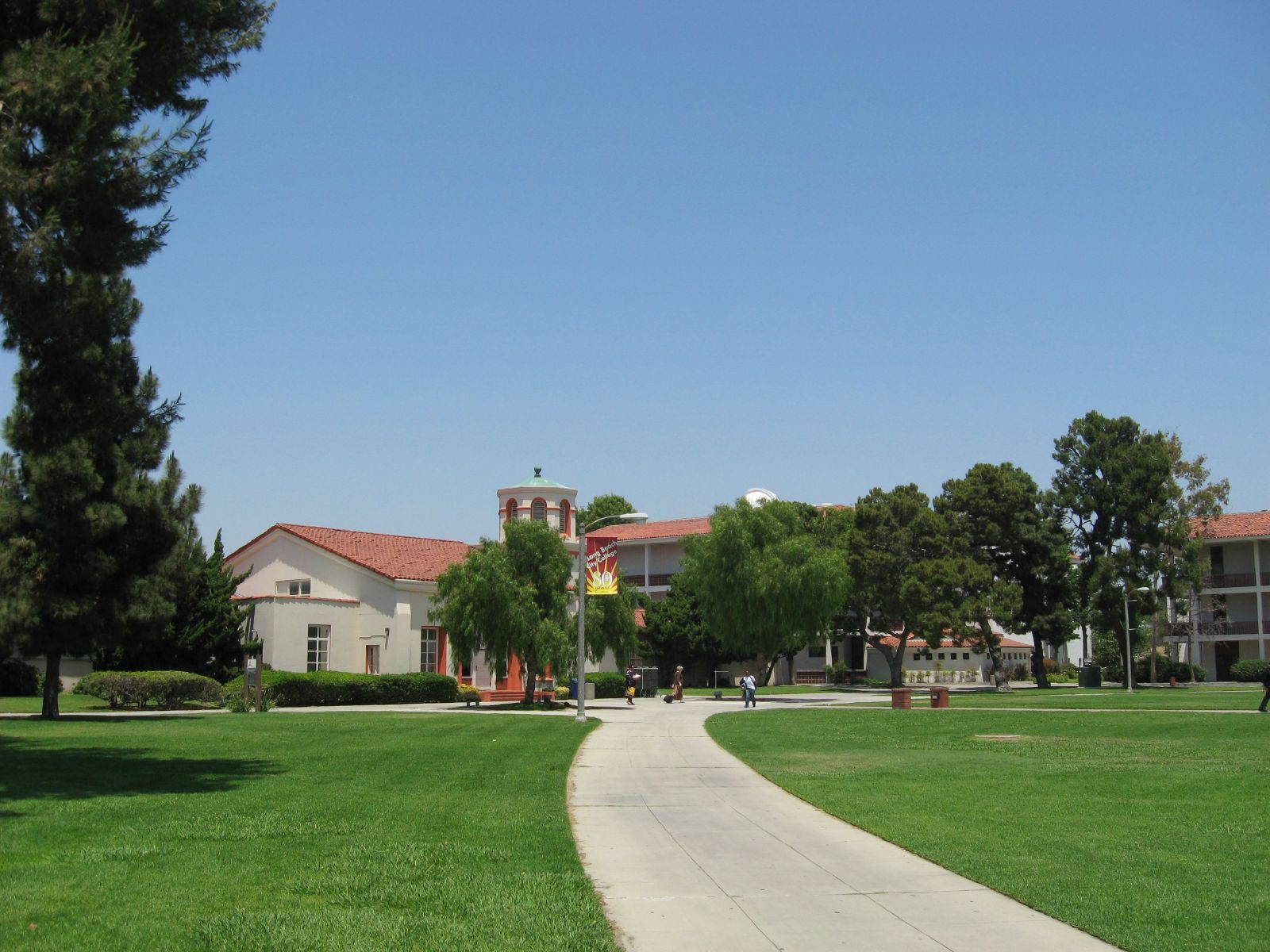
- Liberal Arts Campus Administration Building
- Former name: Long Beach Junior College
- Type: Public community college
- Established: 1927; 99 years ago
- Affiliations: Long Beach Community College District, California Community Colleges, ABA Red Conference
- Superintendent-President: Mike Muñoz
- Faculty: 1,025
- Administrative staff: 543
- Students: 23,866 (fall 2022)
- Location: Long Beach, California, United States; 33°50′3″N 118°8′8″W
- Colors: Red, black, and white
- Nickname: Vikings
- Mascot: Ole the Viking
- Website: lbcc.edu

Long Beach City College (LBCC) is a public community college in Long Beach, California, United States. It was established in 1927 and is divided into two campuses, the Liberal Arts Campus (LAC) in Lakewood Village and the Trades, Technology, and Community Learning Campus (TTC) in central Long Beach on Pacific Coast Highway. It is the only college in the Long Beach Community College District.

LBCC serves San Pedro, Catalina Island and the cities of Long Beach, Lakewood and Signal Hill. During the fall of 2022, the college enrolled 23,866 students.

== History ==
Founded in 1927, Long Beach City College was initially housed at Wilson Classical High School in southeast Long Beach. The 1933 Long Beach earthquake resulted in classes being held at Recreation Park until 1935, when the college moved into its Liberal Arts Campus in Lakewood Village at Carson Street and Clark Avenue. The Public Works Administration was involved in the construction of the Liberal Arts campus.

During and after World War II, the college increased so rapidly that a new campus had to be established. This was realized in 1949 with the establishment of the Pacific Coast Campus, occupied on the former site of Hamilton Junior High School. As Long Beach City College grew in the 1970s, state law separated the college from the Long Beach Unified School District. In that decade and the 1980s, Proposition 13 signaled retrenchment for the college, with many popular classes and services folding.

Also during the 1980s, the arrival of refugees from Southeast Asia resulted in the need for extensive courses in the ESL program. This program became the largest at the college due to a later wave of amnesty applicants.

1987 saw the college acquire neighboring Veterans Memorial Stadium from the City of Long Beach. Even before it acquired the stadium, as far back as the early 1970s, the college was allowed to use its facilities as a practice field and to provide several hundred much-needed parking for students of the college. In recent years, the college has upgraded the stadium playing surface, its swimming pool facility, as well as established wireless internet and e-mail services in 2005.

Bond Measure E has seen the construction of a Child Development Center at the TTC campus, and construction for new buildings on both campuses are underway, including a new South Quad Complex Building on the formers LAC golf mall, a new Industrial Technology Building at the TTC campus, and a new East Campus for the Culinary Arts Program.

From July to November 2025, LAC’s E building was demolished in preparation for a new student center. A groundbreaking ceremony for the new building was held on November 19, 2025.

=== Name ===
Long Beach Junior College opened its doors at Woodrow Wilson High School in 1927 to 503 students, and in 1935, the college moved to the campus on the corner of Carson and Clark. Reorganization brought together all post-high school education in 1944, resulting in the name becoming Long Beach City College, and splitting into the Liberal Arts Division, the General Adult Division, and Technical Institute Division. The Liberal Arts Division remained on the original Junior College campus, and became known as the Liberal Arts Campus (LAC). The General Adult Division and Technical Institute Division offered courses at surrounding educations centers, until a second LBCC campus was opened on the former site of Hamilton Junior High School in 1949 as a result of increased enrollment after World War II. This campus was originally called the Business and Technology Division Campus and eventually became known as the Pacific Coast Campus (PCC) while the Liberal Arts Campus remained the same. In 2024, coinciding with the campus' 75th anniversary, LBCC rebranded PCC as the Trades, Technology, and Community Learning (TTC) Campus.

== Campuses ==
The campuses are located in Long Beach, Los Angeles County, California. The Liberal Arts Campus is situated north of Interstate 405 and south of State Highway 91, along the major roads of Carson Street, which divides the campus in two portions, Lakewood Boulevard, which borders the campus to the west, and Clark Avenue, which borders the campus to the east.

The Trades, Technology, and Community Learning Campus is situated north of Pacific Coast Highway, bordered by Orange Avenue to the west, Walnut Avenue to the east, and Mary Butler School to the north. Year-round, there is a mild climate moderated by ocean breezes from the Pacific.

Most students, faculty and staff commute to campus. Long Beach Transit serves both campuses, with routes 93, 101, 103, and 112 serving LAC, and routes 71, 171, 172, 173, 174, and 175 serving the TTC campus. Due to the increasing student enrollment, there have been issues regarding parking, and as a consequence, those with parking permits usually arrive early during the first few weeks of each semester to avoid traffic. Recent construction projects from Bond Measure E have aggravated the parking situation, but this will be temporary upon completion.

=== Jenni Rivera Performing Arts Center ===
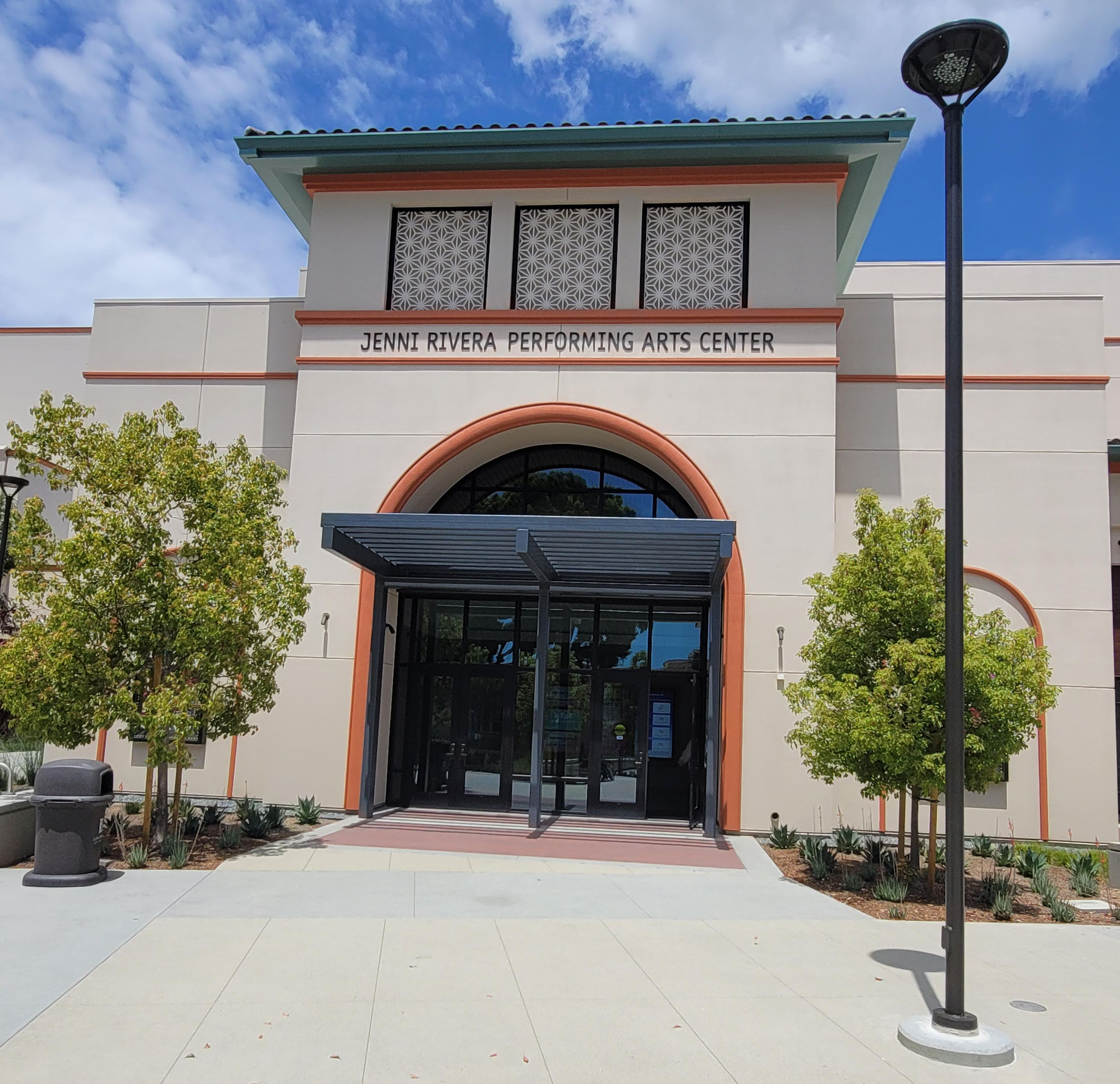
The Jenni Rivera Performing Arts Center at the Liberal Arts Campus

In 2026, the college opened a new performing arts center at its Liberal Arts Campus and named the center after alumna Jenni Rivera. In exchange for the naming, Jenni Rivera Enterprises committed to donating $2 million to the college's foundation over the course of a decade. During the grand opening ceremony on March 26, two of Rivera's daughters, Jacqie and Chiquis, participated in the inaugural performance.

== Academics ==
Fall 2017 Demographics of student body
Ethnicity Distribution
Hispanic and Latino American	60%
African American	11%
Asian American	10%
Native Hawaiian or other Pacific Islander	1%
White European Americans	13%
Multiracial Americans	5%
International students	1%
Unknown	0%
Gender Distribution
Female	55%
Male	45%

Long Beach City College offers a wide range of programs, including business, health, trade and industry, communications, and liberal arts, as well as a wide variety vocational programs spanning various occupational trades. The college has an honors program for its high-achieving students. The English as a Second Language (ESL) program is one of the largest on campus.

The college is divided into six schools:

- School of Business and Social Science
- School of Creative Arts and Applied Sciences
- School of Health, Science and Mathematics
- School of Language Arts
- School of Physical Education and Athletics
- School of Trade and Industrial Technologies

=== Commercial Music Program ===
The Commercial Music Program at Long Beach City College offers a certificate program aimed at "prepar[ing] students for an entry-level position as an audio engineer in fields such as: recording studio, live sound, mastering, music video, foley, television, film, theater, and multi-media".

Many of the professors were and still are successful professionals in the music industry:

- George Shaw
- Maurice Love
- Charles Gutierrez (currently teaching at University of Southern California)
- Christopher Cain (also a taught at University of Southern California and California State University, Long Beach)
- Louie Teran

Many alumni of the Commercial Music Program became successful professionals in the music industry:

- Rickey Minor from the Jay Leno Show
- Wayne Bergeron, a highly acclaimed trumpet player
- Cornelius Mims bass player with Michael Jackson, Smokey Robinson, Kenny Loggins, Gladys Knight, Boyz II Men
- Nikki Harris, composer and vocalist for Madonna, Marilyn Manson, Santana, Jessica Simpson
- Dorian Holley, vocals for Michael Jackson, Rod Stewart, Josh Groban
- Joanna Glass, a recording engineer and touring violinist for Betty Steeles
- "Skee-Lo" Antoine Roundtree
- Warren G

Due to budget restraints, the Commercial Music Program at Long Beach City College was one of 11 programs that were discontinued in 2013. In 2022, LBCC re-opened the Commercial Music Program.

== Student life ==
Long Beach City College is populated with many student-run clubs and organizations. The Associated Student Body (ASB), is the largest group on campus, and is the organization that funds most of the events geared toward students at the college. The ASB Student Senate overlooks the independent clubs as well as the men's and women's social service clubs that used to be under the now-defunct Associated Men's Students (AMS) and Associated Women's Students (AWS). LBCC is also known for having a nationally renowned volunteer service program, as well as the oldest community college intramural athletics program in the nation.

There are campus-run radio and television stations, as well as a campus-run newspaper, named the Viking.

Traditional events include Homecoming Week, the Spring Sing variety show, and Mini Grand Prix, a three-person pushcart race tournament.

Each of the campuses has its own Alpha Gamma Sigma chapter.

The campuses were well known for their high populations of resident domestic rabbits, though since 2011 the population has diminished substantially. The rabbits were humanely trapped and spayed or neutered. Over 200 rabbits were happily adopted, while around three dozen of the now-fixed animals were too wild to become pets and have been allowed to continue roaming the campus.

== Athletics ==
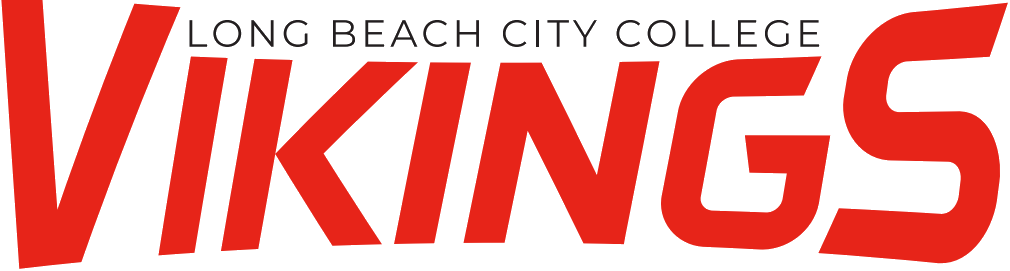
LBCC athetics wordmark

Long Beach City College has 21 athletic programs for men and women. The teams are known as the Vikings, and they have won 16 national and 93 state championships as of Fall 2025. The mascot is a Viking named Ole. The Vikings are recognized as a powerhouse in some of the most competitive community college conferences in California, as well as the nation.

The Long Beach City Vikings compete in the California South Coast Conference, which is part of the California Community College Athletic Association. They formerly competed in the now-defunct California Metropolitan Conference.

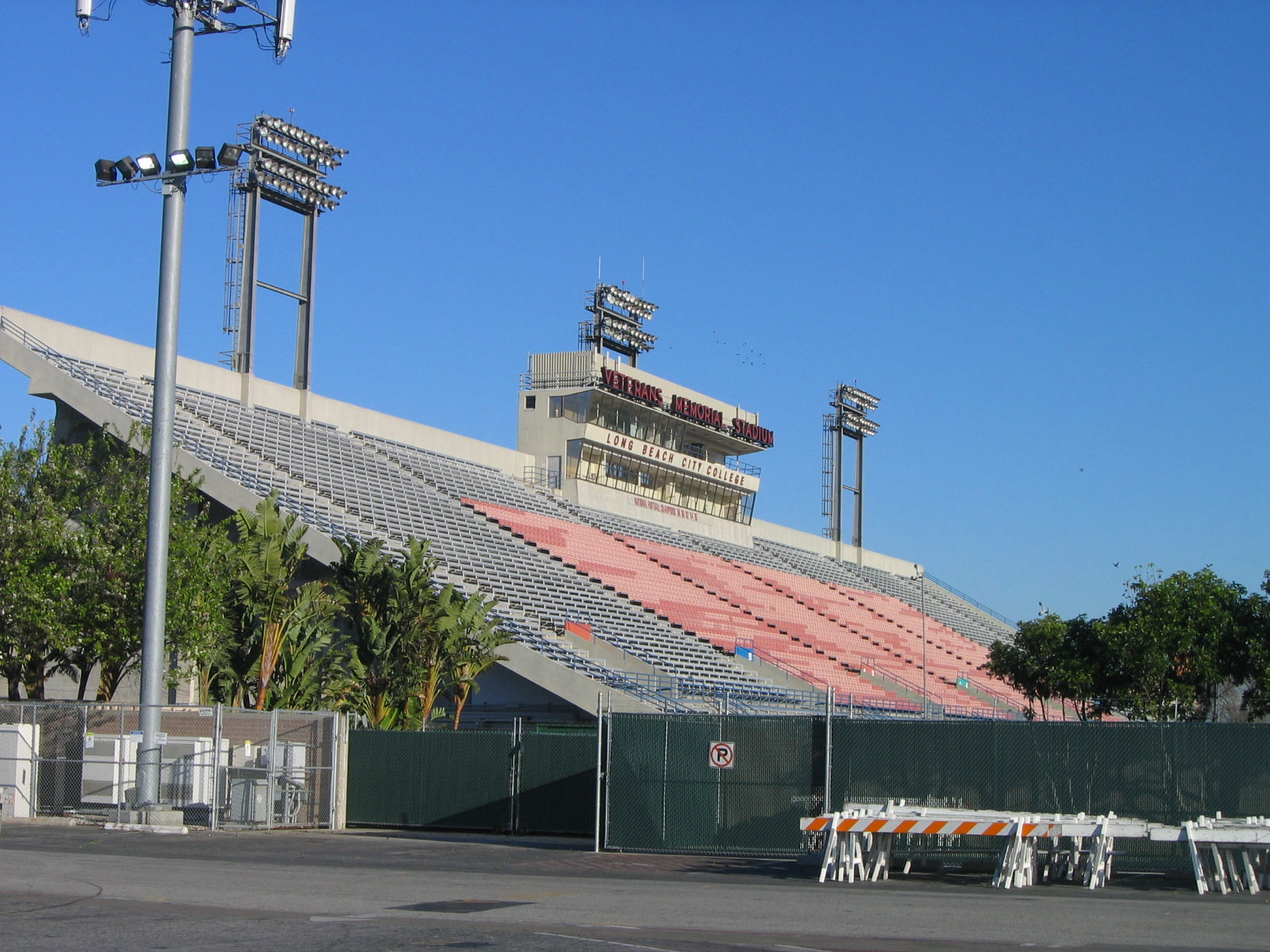
Veterans Memorial Stadium was acquired by the school in 1987 and has since been renovated

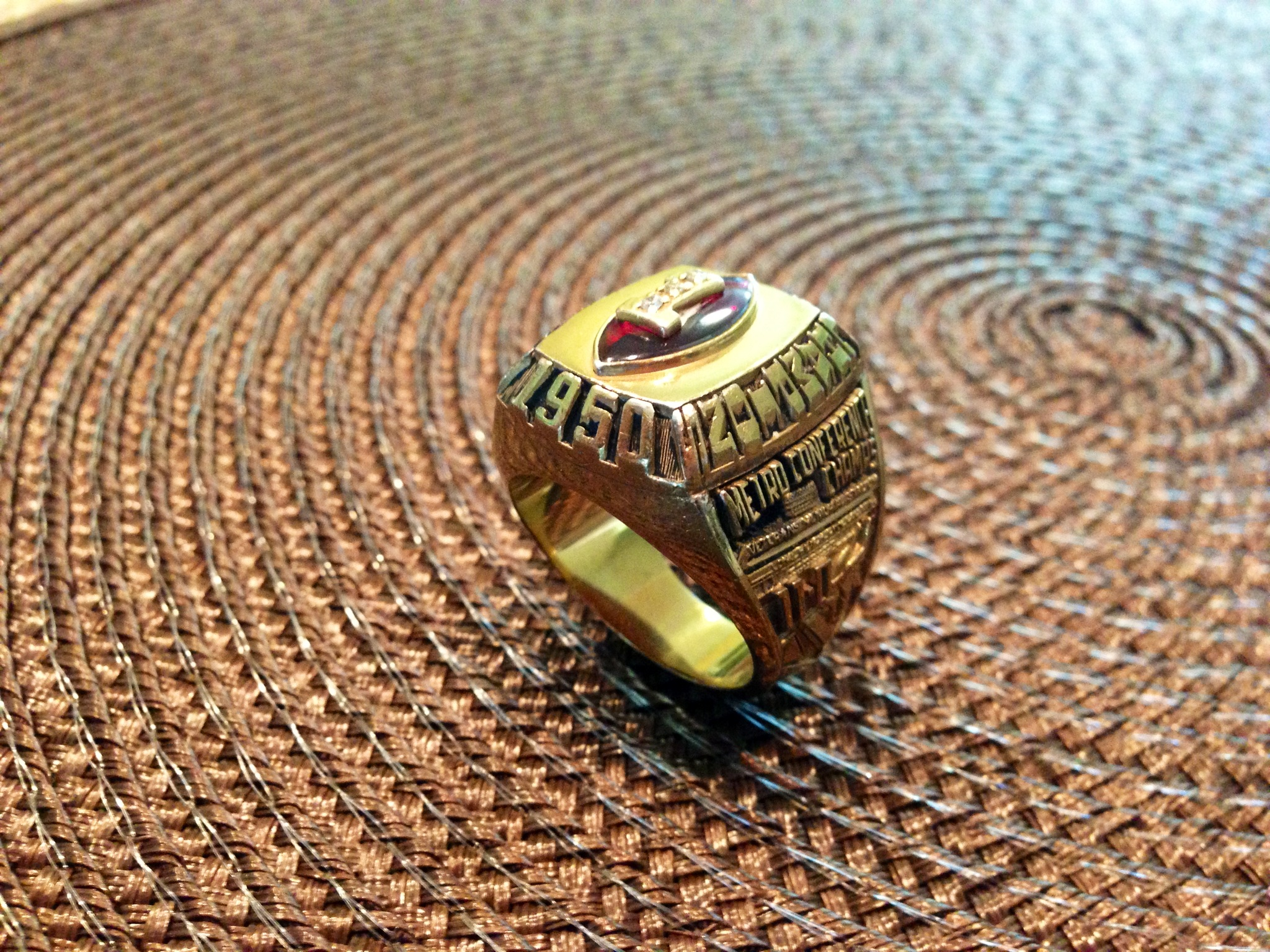
1950 Long Beach football national championship ring

The Long Beach City College Viking's 1950 football team celebrated what would be their first of five national championships:(1950, 1960, 1962, 1964, 1995)

The 2005–06 season saw Long Beach City College win for the first-ever time the Pepsi/NATYCAA Cup, State Associations Division, from the National Association of Two-Year College Athletic Administrators (NATYCAA). This award represents the best junior college athletics program in the state of California. LBCC won the award by 20.5 points over second-place Mount San Antonio College, buoyed by state titles in men's water polo, women's soccer, baseball, and men's volleyball, for a total of 174.5 points.

Hall of Champions, the indoor athletics venue, was the home of the now-defunct Long Beach Breakers of the American Basketball Association's current incarnation.

=== Men's intercollegiate teams ===
Men's intercollegiate teams are: baseball, basketball, cross country, football, golf, soccer, swimming & diving, track and field, volleyball, and water polo.

=== Women's intercollegiate teams ===
Women's intercollegiate teams are: basketball, cross country, golf, soccer, softball, swimming & diving, tennis, track and field, volleyball, and water polo.

== Notable students and faculty ==
=== Students ===
- George Chakiris, Greek-American screen and stage actor and dancer.
- Jenni Rivera, Mexican-American singer-songwriter, entrepreneur
- Ahmad, rapper, songwriter, motivational speaker, and author
- Millicent Borges Accardi, poet, writer, National Endowment for the Arts, Fulbright, Calif. Arts Council
- Dominique Arnold, a track and field athlete.
- LaVar Ball, football player, entrepreneur
- Earl W. Bascom, inventor, actor, rodeo cowboy, Hall of Fame inductee, international artist and sculptor.
- Kenny Booker, basketball player
- Mack Calvin, a basketball player who played in the defunct American Basketball Association.
- Schea Cotton, basketball player
- Damion Easley, baseball player.
- John Fante, writer and screenwriter.
- Bruce Fraser, basketball coach
- Charles Jordan, football player
- Tommy 'Tiny' Lister, actor and former professional wrestler.
- Pat McCormick, a two-time Olympic platform and springboard diver.
- Charles McShane, football player
- Monte Nitzkowski, swimmer and water polo player; Olympics swimmer and water polo coach
- Lute Olson NCAA Champion Basketball Coach
- Markus Steele, football player.
- Greg Townsend, all-time L.A. Raiders sacks leader
- Carl Weathers, actor, linebacker for the Vikings in 1966.
- Charles Miller, musician
- Tom Wilkes, art director
- John Amos, actor

=== Faculty ===
- Chris Oeding, Head Coach of Men's and Women's Water Polo and Professor of Kinesiology
- Marie Pooler, music professor
- Richard Keyes, Professor of Art who taught at the college for 30-years
