= Richard Keyes =

American painter (1930–2012)

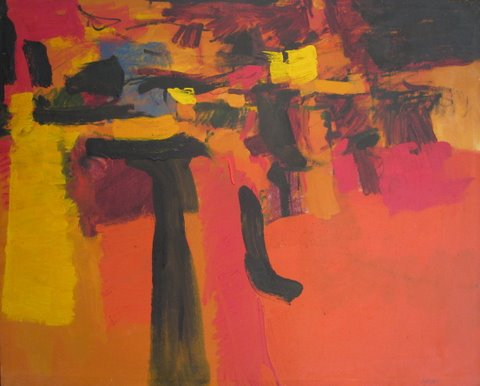
Richard Keyes, Abstract #5, 1959, oil on canvas

Richard D. (Dick) Keyes (October 19, 1930 – August 27, 2012) was an American painter associated with abstract expressionism, impressionist landscapes and the California Plein-Air Painting revival. Keyes was a professor at Long Beach City College, where he taught life drawing and painting for 30 years, between 1961 and 1991. He continued to teach, lecture and demonstrate throughout his retirement, with groups such as the Huntington Beach Art League.

== Biography ==
Richard Keyes was born in Detroit, Michigan, in 1930. His parents, Richard and Estella, encouraged his interest in art early on, and enrolled him in an art school at the age of 16. This propelled him to attend Highland Park Community College and Wayne State University in Detroit. Keyes then served in the United States Air Force, during the Korean War. Upon his discharge from the Air Force and after returning to the United States, he attended the University of Michigan, earning his BA in design in 1957. After marrying, he and his wife Carol moved to California, where he enrolled in the higher education program in Art at the University of California, Berkeley. While at Berkeley, he studied under artists David Park, Glenn Wessels and Erle Loran, and in 1958, he received his master's degree in Painting. His style of painting at this time was Abstract Expressionist, and the Berkeley experience was very important to him, as he said it solidified his awareness and control of the abstract in visual art.

Within several years, Keyes' work shifted to abstracted landscapes. After a period of making welded steel sculptures, he returned to painting, though in a more realistic, yet impressionistic style. His most frequent subjects were the great rolling landscapes and seascapes typical of California's Central and South Coasts, but he also painted in much of the Sierra Nevada Mountains of eastern California.

After his retirement, Keyes studied with California Art Club members Ken Auster, Roger Armstrong, Jeff Horn and Mario Mirkovich. He continued to be a member of several artists groups, such as the California Plein-Air Painters Association and Laguna Beach Plein-Air Painters Association. He exhibited his work every summer at the Art-A-Fair Festival, in Laguna Beach, California, only stopping these shows due to his declining health. He died at home of complications from heart failure at the age of 81.

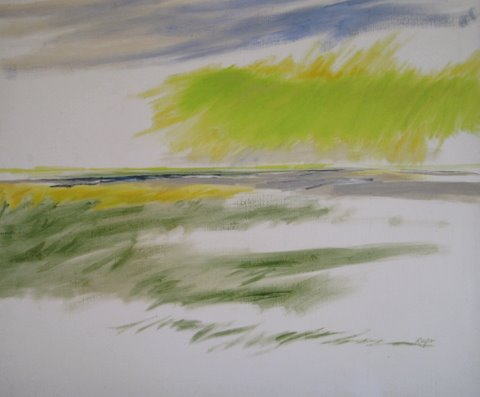
Richard Keyes, Spring Prairie, 1969, oil on canvas

== Exhibitions ==
- San Francisco Museum of Art, 77th Annual SF Art Association Show - 1958
- Oakland Art Museum, California Painters' Annual Exhibitions - 1958, 1960
- Jack London Square Annual - 1958, 1959, 1960
- Tulare County Art League Annual - 1959 1st & 2nd Prize
- Downey Museum 7th Annual - 1964 Honorable Mention
- CSU Long Beach / Long Beach City College Faculty Int'l - 1965
- All California Art Show, San Diego - 1965
- 1st Annual So. California Teachers Show, Los Angeles - 1966
- 1ntroductions '69, 4 person show, Downey Art Museum - 1969
- Prospectives / Art '70, Huntington Beach - 1970
- Long Beach City College Faculty Exhibitions - 1963 to 1991
- Silver Discovery Award - Art of California Magazine 1991
- Bronze Discovery Award - Art of California Magazine 1991
- Los Alamitos Art League Annual - 1991
- Long Beach City College: 30 Year Retrospective Show - 1991
- Crystal Court Art Walk Exhibit, South Coast Plaza - 1992
- Huntington Beach Art League Art Associates Open Show - 1992 to 2011 (1995 Best of Show)
- Affair in the Garden, Beverly Hills - 1992
- Yosemite National Park, Guest Artist/Instructor - 1993 to 2007
- Newport Beach Public Library, Solo Show - 1993
- Descanso Gardens, La Canada - 1994
- Wilshire Landmark & Northrop Plaza Show - 1995
- Morro Bay Harbor Festival - 1995
- All Southern California Open - 1997
- Artists Corner Gallery, Solo Show - 1997
- Newport Beach Spring Juried Show - 1997
- Orange County Fair - 1997 Honorable Mention
- Surf City Festival Art Show - 1998 2nd Prize, 1999 1st Prize
- Cypress Juried Show - 1999
- Bolsa Chica Open - 2000
- Morro Bay Art in the Park - 2002
- Laguna Plein Air Painters Assoc. Juried Show - 2001–2006, 2012
- So. Cal. Plein Air Painters Assoc. Juried Show - 2002–2004
- Anaheim Art Assoc. Show - 2006
- Art-A-Fair, Laguna Beach - 1991 to 2011
- Banter, Worldwide - 2014

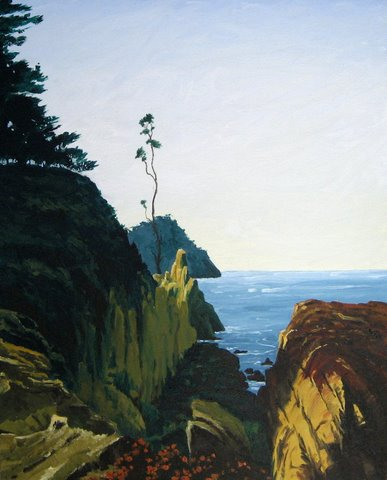
Richard Keyes, Monterey Coast, 2009, oil on canvas

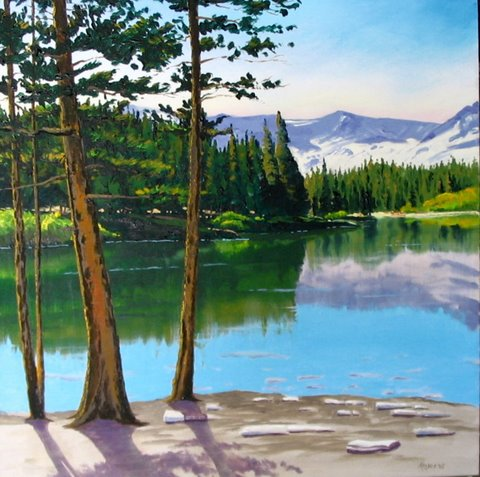
Richard Keyes, Spring at Lake Mamie, 2007, oil on canvas
