= Christopher Temporelli =

American opera singer

Dr. Christopher Temporelli is an American operatic bass and concert singer, radio host, TV personality, speaker, and author/creator of the FLOW Freedom Laws of the World system (published through the Times of India and Pine Wizard Press).

== Life and career ==
Christopher Temporelli's professional opera debut was in 2005 with the Fort Worth Opera in Bass Performance Hall. He won the Norman Carlberg Award from the LiederKranz Society in 2006 with award recital in Weill Hall, Carnegie Hall. Also in 2006, he was presented the Andy Anselmo Achievement Award at New York City's Hudson Theatre. As part of the Young American Artists Program at the GlimmerGlass Opera, Temporelli sang the roles of Plutone in Christopher Alden's production of Monteverdi's L'Orfeo and the Judge in Philip Glass's Orphée.

His Canadian mainstage debut with Toronto Canada's Opera Atelier was reviewed positively by The Globe and Mail. Temporelli later joined New York City Opera and appeared at Virginia Opera, Opera Saratoga (formerly Lake George Opera), Syracuse Opera, Opera Memphis, the Washington Chorus at the Kennedy Center, New Choral Society, Princeton Pro Musica, National Arts Centre Orchestra Ottawa, Seoul Arts Center, and Sejong Center.

Temporelli completed a doctor of Musical Arts with Shirley Verrett and George Shirley at the University of Michigan.

Christopher is on the roster of Robert Gilder & Co Management.
