= E.Y. Zhao =

American novelist

- Born: St. Louis, Missouri, U.S.
- Education: Harvard College (BA) University of Michigan (MFA)
- Occupation: Novelist
- Writing career
- Language: English
- Notable work: Underspin (2025)
- Notable awards: Hopwood Award

E.Y. Zhao is an American novelist. Her debut novel, Underspin, was released in 2025.

== Early life ==
Zhao grew up in St. Louis, Missouri, and played professional table tennis from the ages of nine to seventeen. She holds a BA in history from Harvard College and an MFA from the University of Michigan.

== Career ==
Zhao's work has appeared in The Georgia Review, Electric Literature, and Chicago Review of Books. She has been recognized by the Georgia Review Prose Prize, the Le Baron Russell Briggs Prize, and the Hopwood Awards.

In 2025, Zhao released her debut novel, Underspin, with Astra House. Publishers Weekly called it an "illuminating story of dedication and sacrifice." Kirkus Reviews called it "[a] smart novel that examines the impact competitive sports have on kids without assigning winners or losers."
