= Cynthia Haven =

American literary scholar, critic, slavicist, and journalist (born 1963)

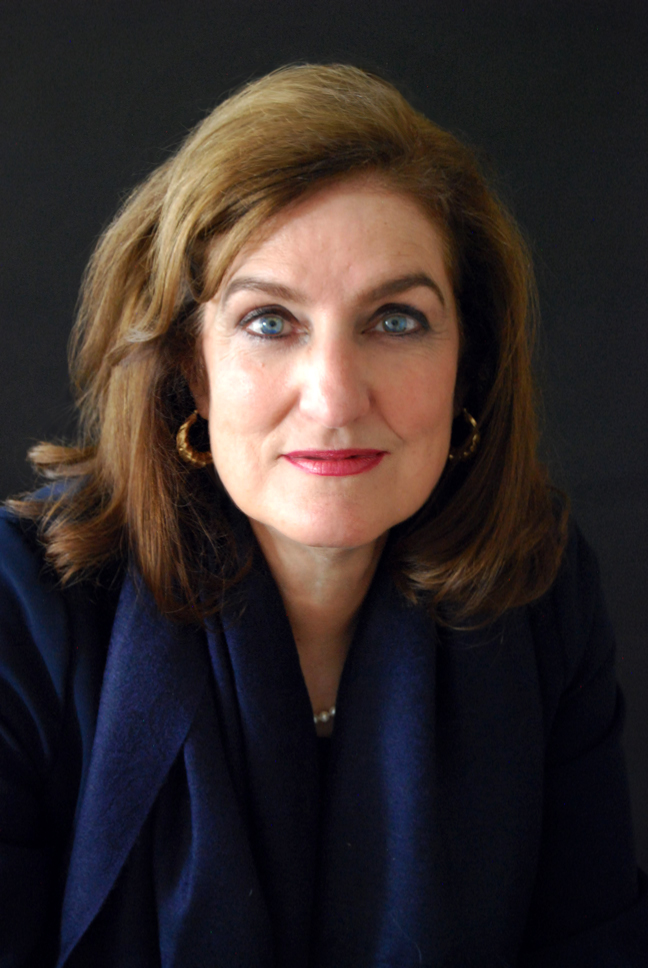
Photo by Margo Davis

Cynthia L. Haven is an American literary scholar, author, critic, Slavicist, and journalist. She is a National Endowment for the Humanities Public Scholar.

== Education ==
While at the University of Michigan, she was awarded two prestigious Hopwood Awards and studied with Nobel poet Joseph Brodsky.

== Publications ==
Her books include Evolution of Desire: A Life of René Girard, which the San Francisco Chronicle named one of the best books of 2018. The biography was also named a 2019 CHOICE Magazine Outstanding Academic Title. Her Czesław Miłosz: A California Life was a finalist for a Northern California Book Award. Leading critic and editor Leon Wieseltier wrote, “Her intuition is right: Czesław Miłosz and California are indeed a chapter in each other's history.”

Her books have been reviewed in The New York Review of Books, The Times Literary Supplement, World Literature Today, The San Francisco Chronicle, Harper's Magazine and many other publications.

Her Penguin Modern Classics anthology for René Girard, All Desire Is a Desire for Being: Essential Writings was published in June 2023 in the U.K., and the following year in the U.S. She was the editor for a short German anthology on Girard, published in 2022 with the Leipzig publisher Reclam, for its popular "Was bedeutet das alles?" series.

== Recognition ==
She was awarded a Milena Jesenská Journalism Fellowship with the Institut für die Wissenschaften vom Menschen in Vienna and was a visiting scholar at Stanford University's Division of Literatures, Cultures, and Languages while researching her book on French theorist René Girard. She was a Voegelin fellow at the Hoover Institution while working on her book on Nobel poet Joseph Brodsky and his translator, George L. Kline. She held the inaugural Milton Cottage Residency in Chalfont St. Giles, United Kingdom, in 2018. She blogs at The Book Haven. She has written for a wide range of publications, including The Times Literary Supplement, The Washington Post, the Los Angeles Times, and The New York Times Book Review. She was awarded the inaugural Novitāte award in Washington D.C., November 6, 1923. She was a guest of the city of Kraków in the summer of 2024, and gave the inaugural Miłosz Lecture. She gave the 2025 McDermott Lecture at the University of Dallas. She is on the faculty of the University of Saint Thomas in Houston.

== Books ==
1. All Desire Is a Desire for Being: Essential Writings (London: Penguin Modern Classics, 2023; New York: Penguin Modern Classics, 2024).
2. Warum kämpfen wir? Und wie hören wir auf? (Leipzig: Reclam, 2022).
3. Czesław Miłosz: A California Life (Berkeley: Heyday, 2021; Kraków: Znak, 2024).
4. The Man Who Brought Brodsky Into English: Conversations with George L. Kline (Boston: Academic Studies Press, 2021).
5. Conversations with René Girard: Prophet of Envy (London: Bloomsbury, 2020).
6. Evolution of Desire: A Life of René Girard, (Lansing: Michigan State University Press, 2018).
7. Everything Came to Me at Once: The Intellectual Vision of René Girard(Belmont, NC: Wiseblood, 2017).
8. Iosif Brodskii: Conversazioni (Milan, Italy: Adelphi, 2015).
9. An Invisible Rope: Portraits of Czesław Miłosz (Athens, Ohio: Swallow/Ohio University Press, 2011).
10. Czesław Miłosz: Conversations, (Jackson: University Press of Mississippi, Literary Conversations Series, 2006).
11. Three Poets in Conversation (London: Waywiser, 2006).
12. Peter Dale in Conversation with Cynthia Haven (London: Waywiser, 2005).
13. Joseph Brodsky: Conversations (Jackson: University Press of Mississippi, Literary Conversations Series, 2003).

== Selected Interviews and Articles ==
1. [1] "They Sold Their Shadows," Times Literary Supplement, August 7, 2026.
2. "3sat: Kulturzeit' series on leading thinkers of digital authoritarianism," January 6, 2026.
3. , Cynthia L. Haven, "Constellation of Genius: Miłosz, Camus, Einstein, and Weil", Church Life Journal, January 24, 2025; "Konstelacja Geniuszu: Miłosz, Camus, Einstein i Weil," Odra, December 2025, 45-51.
4. BBC, "Beyond Belief,"René Girard: The Catholic Thinker Influencing Silicon Valley," November 30, 2025.
5. Cynthia L. Haven, "Things Worth Remembering: 'Endurance Comes Only from Enduring'", The Free Press, June 29, 2025.
6. Cynthia L. Haven, "Your World Is on the Line",Times Literary Supplement, February 28, 2025.
7. René Girard at the End of Time," the endowed McDermott Lecture at the University of Dallas, February 27, 2025.
8. Cynthia L. Haven, "Hatelessly Yours, Joseph," Hoover Digest, Winter 2025.
9. "Love Triumphs over Violence—Eventually: Cynthia L. Haven on René Girard, Joy Davidman's Curious Path to C.S. Lewis, Poets in Exile, More", Miller's Book Review, November 2, 2024.
10. Cynthia L. Haven, "The Prophets: René Girard," "The Free Press," April 27, 2024.
11. Milosz and the Captive Mind, course syllabus. In R. Ravaglia (Ed.), Education and Liberty. The Ricketts Great Books College, 2024.
12. "Cynthia L. Haven Talks About René Girard,'' Chronicle of Higher Education Review, October 9, 2023.
13. "Cynthia Haven: From Envy to Forgiveness", Meditations with Zohar, Apple Podcasts, February 14, 2023.
14. "To become a signature voice of a nation, try living in exile in California," San Francisco Chronicle, February 5, 2023
15. "Cynthia L. Haven on René Girard, Czeslaw Milosz, and Joseph Brodsky," Conversations with Tyler Cowen, Aug. 24, 2022
16. "'Poetry Has to Defend Itself': A Conversation with Adam Zagajewski", Los Angeles Review of Books, April 6, 2021.
17. "Czesław Miłosz: A California Life," Robert Pogue Harrison's "Entitled Opinions," July 25, 2022.
18. "At the Mercy of My Passions and Opinions: A Conversation with William Kennedy", Los Angeles Review of Books, June 8, 2020
19. "René Girard and the Present Moment," inaugural McGrath Church Life Journal lecture at the University of Notre Dame, December 5, 2019.
20. "Czesław Miłosz: A California Life — A Conversation with Cynthia L. Haven," The Athenaeum Review, Episode 45, 2019.
21. "Cynthia Haven: Interview with Scott Beauchamp, "Full Stop: Reviews, Interviews, Marginalia," May 15, 2019.
22. "René Girard and the Mysterious Nature of Desire", Johns Hopkins University The Hub, August 8, 2018.
23. "Ismail Kadare Grapples With the Supernatural", New York Times Book Review, February 23, 2018.
24. "Brodsky and His Muses", Hoover Digest, July 7, 2017.
25. "Mad Russia Hurt Me Into Poetry: An Interview with Maria Stepanova", Los Angeles Review of Books, June 15, 2017.
26. "Stanford Professor and Eminent French theorist Rene Girard, member of the Académie Française, dies at 91," Stanford Report, Nov. 4, 2015.
27. "Rediscovering Regina Derieva", Times Literary Supplement, October 11, 2014.
28. "An interview with Philip Roth: 'The novelist's obsession is with language'”, The Book Haven, February 3, 2014.
