= The Swan Thieves =

2010 novel by American author Elizabeth Kostova

- First edition
- Author: Elizabeth Kostova
- Language: English
- Publisher: Little, Brown and Company
- Publication date: 2010
- Publication place: United States
- ISBN: 978-0-316-06578-8

The Swan Thieves is a 2010 novel by American author Elizabeth Kostova. The "old painter" described in the book before the first chapter is Alfred Sisley. Beatrice de Clerval is not based on a single real artist, but Kostova was influenced in developing her life by the life of Berthe Morisot.

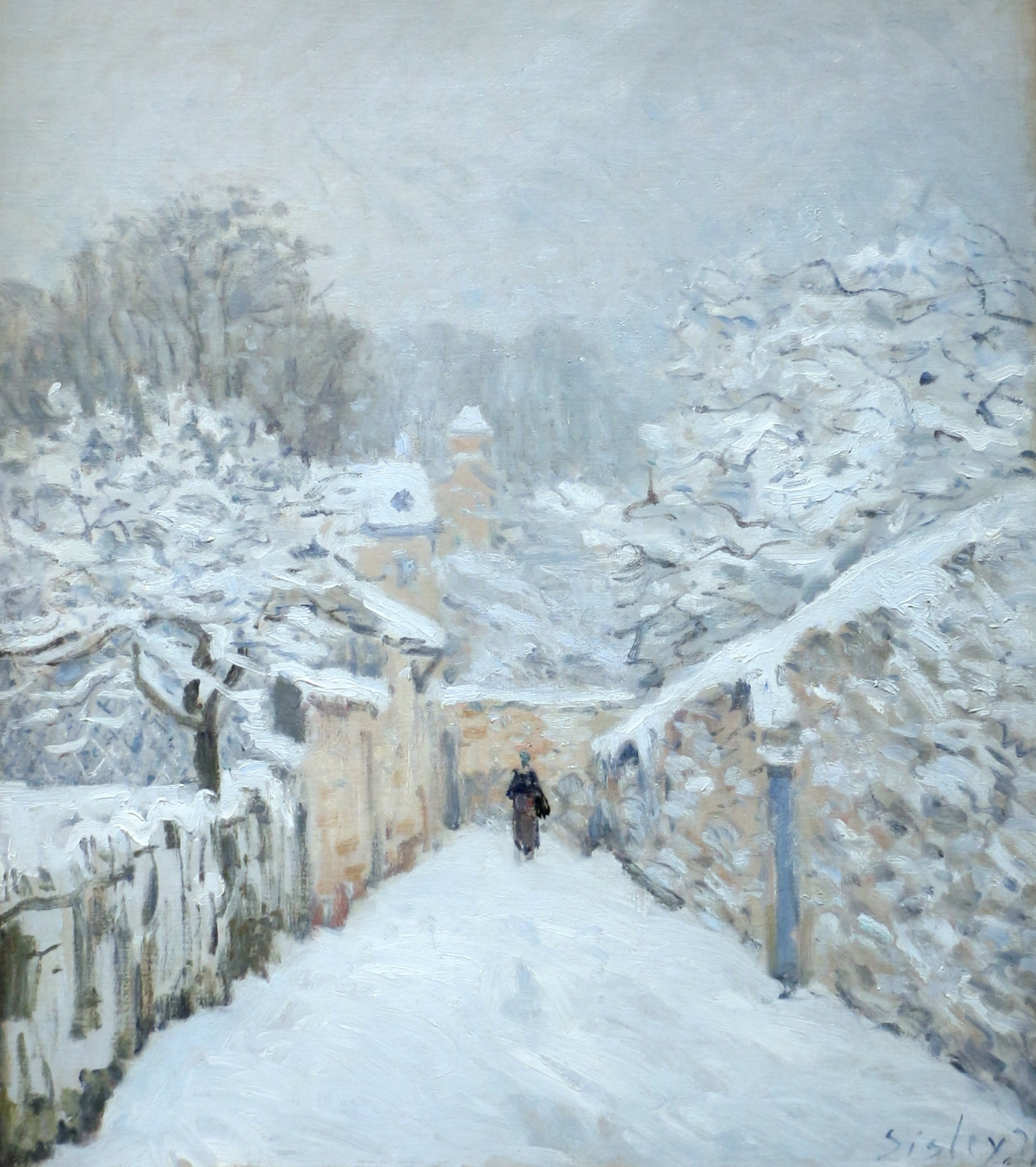
La Neige à Louveciennes (Snow at Louveciennes)

== Reception ==
Entertainment Weekly gave the book a "C" grade. The Washington Post said, "Kostova's new book, set partly in Washington, tells a rather simple story, and its characters, although they sometimes insist otherwise, don't change radically over time. (All are painters, and they're not much different, in interest or in outlook, from one another.)"

The Swan Thieves returned Kostova to The New York Times Best Seller list. In the United States, the novel debuted at number four on The New York Times Best Seller list of best-selling hardcover fiction and remained in the top 20 for over a month. In Canada, the novel debuted at number seven on The Globe and Mail's bestseller list. The Swan Thieves was one of only 126 hardcover novels to sell over 100,000 copies in the United States in 2010, ultimately selling 118,218 copies within that calendar year.
