= Underspin =

Underspin is a debut novel by E.Y. Zhao. It was inspired by Zhao's own experiences growing up playing table tennis.

== Critical reception ==
Publishers Weekly stated that the novel is "an illuminating story of dedication and sacrifice."

Kirkus Reviews called it "[a] smart novel that examines the impact competitive sports have on kids without assigning winners or losers."
