= Victoria Johnson =

American author and historian

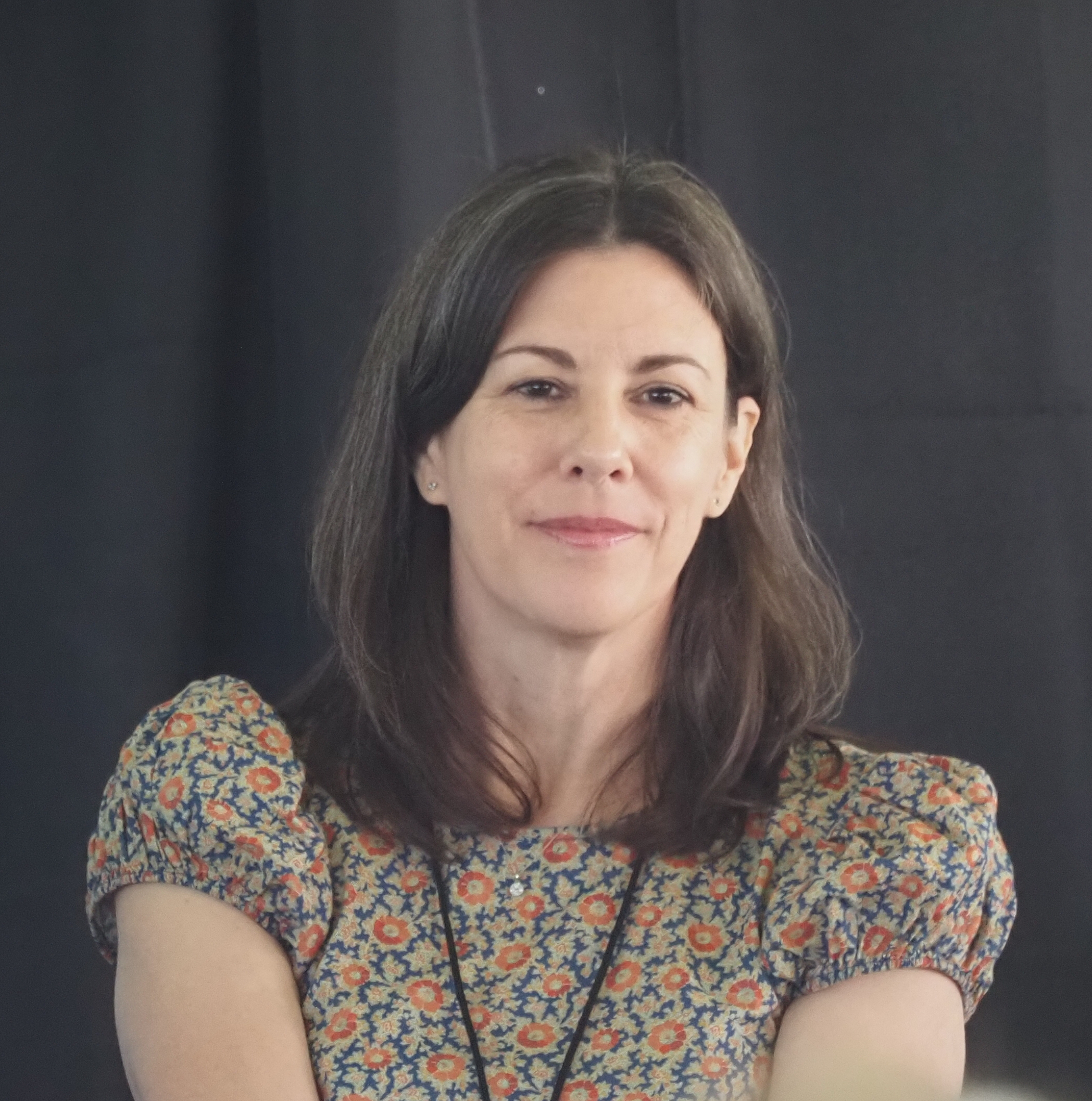
- at the 2026 Gaithersburg Book Festival
- Born: 1969 (age 56–57); Ithaca, New York, U.S.
- Awards: Pulitzer Prize for History finalist National Book Award for Nonfiction finalist

Academic background
- Education: B.A., 1991, Philosophy, Yale University; Humboldt-Universität; PhD., 2002, Sociology, Columbia University
- Thesis: Founding Culture: Art, Politics, and Organization at the Paris Opera, 1669-1792” (2002)

Academic work
- Institutions: University of Michigan; Hunter College
- Notable works: American Eden: David Hosack, Botany, and Medicine in the Garden of the Early Republic

Victoria Johnson (born 1969) is an American author and historian. She is a Professor of Urban Policy and Planning at Hunter College.

== Early life and education ==
Johnson was born and raised in Ithaca, New York. She attended Yale University for her Bachelor of Arts degree and Columbia University for a PhD in Sociology. Her sister, Elizabeth Kostova, is also an author.

== Career ==
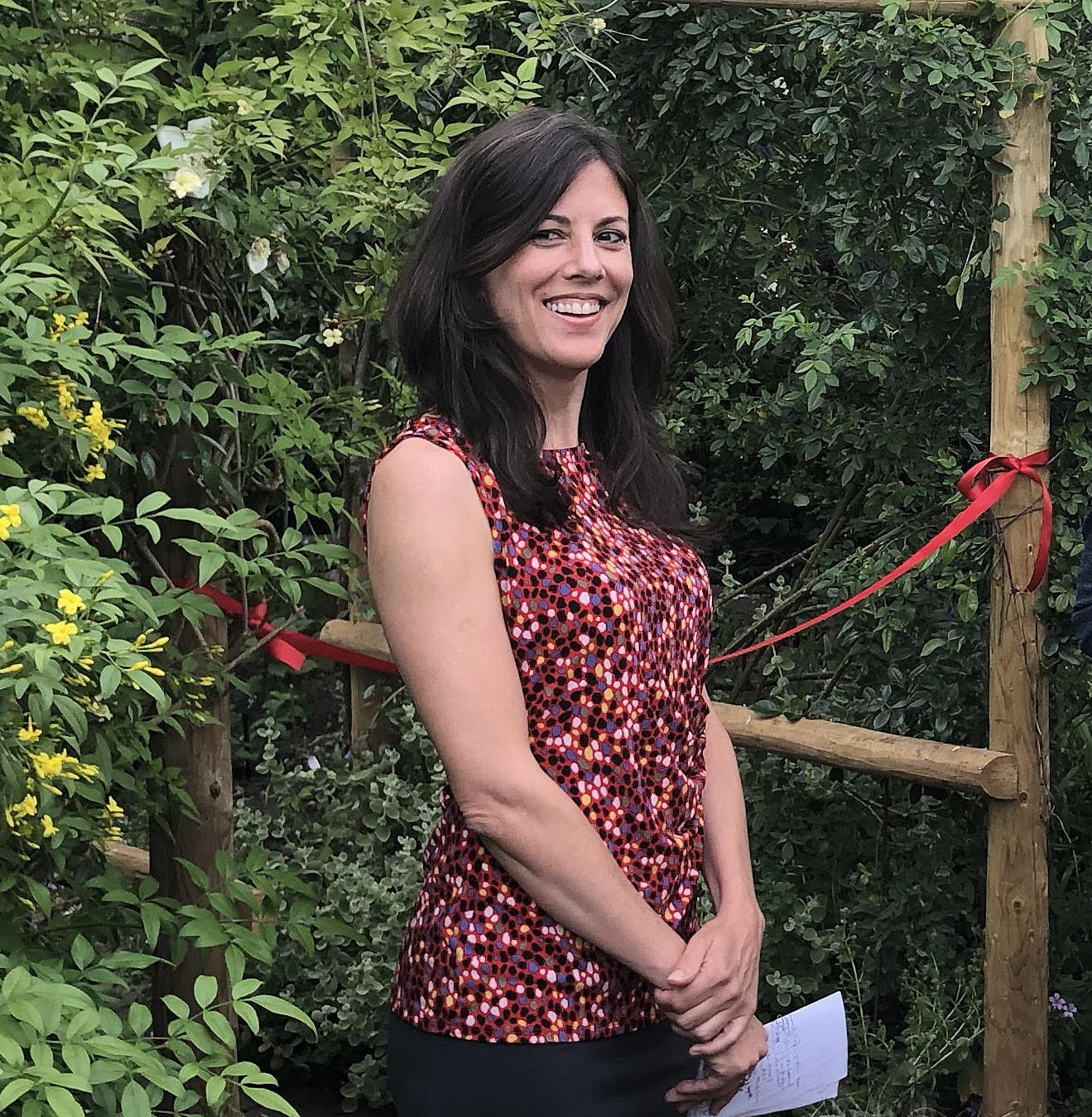
2019 portrait by Markley Boyer

After earning her PhD, Johnson taught at the University of Michigan. While there, she published Backstage at the Revolution: How the Royal Paris Opera Survived the End of the Old Regime through University of Chicago Press. She was promoted from assistant to Associate Professor of Organizational Studies in 2011. Johnson eventually left the University of Michigan to join the faculty of Urban Policy and Planning at Hunter College. During the 2015–16 academic term, she was a fellow at the Cullman Center for Scholars and Writers.

Johnson was a Mellon Visiting Scholar at the New York Botanical Garden's Humanities Institute in 2016, where she conducted research on David Hosack. After her first proposal was rejected for being "too academic," she published a biography of David Hosack in 2018 titled American Eden: David Hosack, Botany, and Medicine in the Garden of the Early Republic. Her book was subsequently nominated for the National Book Award for Nonfiction, Pulitzer Prize for History, and Los Angeles Times Book Prize for Biography. The following year, she received the 2019 John Brinckerhoff Jackson Prize and was shortlisted for the Cundill History Prize.

In 2026 Johnson published Glorious Country: How the Artist Frederic Church Brought the World to America and America to the World, the first biography of Church; she was also awarded the 2026 Frederic Church Award.
