= The Historian =

2005 novel by Elizabeth Kostova

- The Historian's first edition cover shows a blood red curtain with a snippet of a picture of a man's face laid across it. Although the book is a vampire novel, Kostova promised herself "that only a cup of blood would be spilled" in the novel.
- Author: Elizabeth Kostova
- Language: English
- Published: 2005 (Little, Brown and Company)
- Publication place: United States
- ISBN: 0-316-01177-0

The Historian is the 2005 debut novel of American author Elizabeth Kostova. The plot blends the history and folklore of Vlad Țepeș and his fictional equivalent Count Dracula. Kostova's father told her stories about Dracula when she was a child, and later in life she was inspired to turn the experience into a novel. She worked on the book for ten years and then sold it within a few months to Little, Brown and Company, which bought it for US$2 million.

The Historian has been described as a combination of genres, including Gothic novel, adventure novel, detective fiction, travelogue, postmodern historical novel, epistolary epic, and historical thriller. Kostova was intent on writing a serious work of literature and saw herself as an inheritor of the Victorian style. Although based in part on Bram Stoker's Dracula, The Historian is not a horror novel, but rather an eerie tale. It is concerned with history's role in society and representation in books, as well as the nature of good and evil. As Kostova explains, "Dracula is a metaphor for the evil that is so hard to undo in history." The evils brought about by religious conflict are a particular theme, and the novel explores the relationship between the Christian West and the Islamic East.

Little, Brown and Company heavily promoted the book and it became the first debut novel to become number one on The New York Times bestseller list in its first week on sale. As of 2005, it was the fastest-selling hardback debut novel in U.S. history. In general, the novel received mixed reviews. While some praised the book's description of the setting, others criticized its structure and lack of tonal variety. Kostova received the 2006 Book Sense award for Best Adult Fiction and the 2005 Quill Award for Debut Author of the Year. Sony has bought the film rights and, as of 2007, was planning an adaptation.

== Plot summary ==
How these papers have been placed in sequence will be made manifest in the reading of them. All needless matters have been eliminated so that a history almost at variance with the possibilities of latter-day belief may stand forth as simple fact. There is throughout no statement of past things wherein memory may err, for all the records chosen are exactly contemporary, given from the stand-points and within the range of knowledge of those who made them.

— Epigraph to Part One of The Historian from Bram Stoker's Dracula (1897)

The Historian interweaves the history and folklore of Vlad Țepeș, a 15th-century prince of Wallachia known as "Vlad the Impaler", and his fictional equivalent Count Dracula together with the story of Paul, a professor; his 16-year-old daughter; and their quest for Vlad's tomb. The novel ties together three separate narratives using letters and oral accounts: that of Paul's mentor in the 1930s, that of Paul in the 1950s, and that of the narrator herself in the 1970s. The tale is told primarily from the perspective of Paul's daughter, who is never named.

=== Part I ===
Part I opens in 1972 Amsterdam. The narrator finds an old vellum-bound book with a woodcut of a dragon in the center associated with Dracula. When she asks her father Paul about it, he tells her how he found the handmade book in his study carrel when he was a graduate student in the 1950s. Paul took the book to his mentor, Professor Bartholomew Rossi, and was shocked to find that Rossi had found a similar handmade book when he was a graduate student in the 1930s. As a result, Rossi researched Țepeș, the Dracula myth surrounding him, and the mysterious book. Rossi traveled as far as Istanbul; however, the appearance of curious characters and unexplained events caused him to drop his investigation and return to his graduate work. Rossi gives Paul his research notes and informs him that he believes Dracula is still alive.

The bulk of the novel focuses on the 1950s timeline, which follows Paul's adventures. After meeting with Paul, Rossi disappears; smears of blood on his desk and the ceiling of his office are the only traces that remain. Certain that something unfortunate has befallen his advisor, Paul begins to investigate Dracula. While in the university library he meets a young, dark-haired woman reading a copy of Bram Stoker's Dracula. She is Helen Rossi, the daughter of Bartholomew Rossi, and she has become an expert on Dracula. Paul attempts to convince her that one of the librarians is trying to prevent their research into Dracula, but she is unpersuaded. Later, the librarian attacks and bites Helen. Paul intervenes and overpowers him, but he wriggles free. The librarian is then run over by a car in front of the library and apparently killed.

Upon hearing her father's story, the narrator becomes interested in the mystery and begins researching Dracula as she and her father travel across Europe during the 1970s. Although he eventually sends her home, she does not remain there. After finding letters addressed to her that reveal he has left on a quest to find her mother (previously believed to be dead), she sets out to find him. As is slowly made clear in the novel, Helen is the narrator's mother. The letters continue the story her father has been telling her. The narrator decides to travel to a monastery where she believes her father might be.

=== Part II ===
Part II begins as the narrator reads descriptions of her father and Helen's travels through Eastern Europe during the 1950s. While on their travels, Helen and Paul conclude that Rossi might have been taken by Dracula to his tomb. They travel to Istanbul to find the archives of Sultan Mehmed II, which Paul believes contain information regarding the location of the tomb. They fortuitously meet Professor Turgut Bora from Istanbul University, who has also discovered a book similar to Paul's and Rossi's. He has access to Mehmed's archive, and together they unearth several important documents. They also see the librarian who was supposedly killed in the United States – he has survived because he is a vampire and he has continued following Helen and Paul. Helen shoots the vampire librarian but misses his heart and consequently, he does not die.

From Istanbul, Paul and Helen travel to Budapest, Hungary, to further investigate the location of Dracula's tomb and to meet with Helen's mother, who they believe may have knowledge of Rossi – the two had met during his travels to Romania in the 1930s. For the first time Helen hears of her mother and Rossi's torrid love affair. Paul and Helen learn much, for example that Helen's mother, and therefore Helen herself and the narrator, are descendants of Vlad Țepeș.

=== Part III ===
Part III begins with a revelation by Turgut Bora that leads the search for Dracula's tomb to Bulgaria. He also reveals that he is part of an organization formed by Sultan Mehmed II from the elite of the Janissaries to fight the Order of the Dragon, an evil consortium later associated with Dracula. In Bulgaria, Helen and Paul seek the assistance of a scholar named Anton Stoichev. Through information gained from Stoichev, Helen and Paul discover that Dracula is most likely buried in the Bulgarian monastery of Sveti Georgi.

After many difficulties Paul and Helen discover the whereabouts of Sveti Georgi. Upon reaching the monastery they find Rossi's interred body in the crypt and are forced to drive a silver dagger through his heart to prevent his full transformation into a vampire. Before he dies, he reveals that Dracula is a scholar and has a secret library. Rossi has written an account of his imprisonment in this library and hidden it there. Paul and Helen are pursued to the monastery by political officials and by the vampire librarian – all of them are seeking Dracula's tomb, but it is empty when they arrive.

Paul and Helen move to the United States, marry, and Helen gives birth to the narrator. However, she becomes depressed a few months afterwards. She later confesses that she feared the taint of the vampiric bite that she acquired earlier would infect her child. The family travels to Europe in an attempt to cheer her up. When they visit the monastery Saint-Matthieu-des-Pyrénées-Orientales, Helen feels Dracula's presence and is compelled to jump off a cliff. Landing on grass, she survives and decides to hunt him down and kill him in order to rid herself of his threat and her fears.

When the narrator arrives at Saint-Matthieu-des-Pyrénées-Orientales, she finds her father. Individuals mentioned throughout the 1970s timeline converge in a final attempt to defeat Dracula. He is seemingly killed by a silver bullet fired into his heart by Helen.

In the epilogue, which takes place in 2008, the narrator attends a conference of medievalists in Philadelphia, and stops at a library with an extensive collection of material related to Dracula. She accidentally leaves her notes and the attendant rushes out and returns them to her, as well as a book with a dragon printed in the center, revealing that either Dracula is still alive or one of his minions is imitating the master.

== Background and publication ==
=== Biographical background ===
Kostova's interest in the Dracula legend began with the stories her father told her about the vampire when she was a child. The family moved from the U.S. to Ljubljana, Slovenia in 1972, while her father was teaching for a year at a local university. During that year, the family traveled across Europe. According to Kostova, "It was the formative experience of my childhood." She "was fascinated by [her father's Dracula stories] because they were ... from history in a way, even though they weren't about real history, but I heard them in these beautiful historic places." Kostova's interest in books and libraries began early as well. Her mother, a librarian, frequently took her and her sisters to the public library – they were each allowed to check out 30 books and had a special shelf for their library books.

She listened to recordings of Balkan folk music as a child and became interested in the tradition. Later, she sang in and directed a Slavic chorus while an undergraduate at Yale University. She and some friends traveled to Eastern Europe in 1989, specifically Bulgaria and Bosnia, to study local musical customs. The recordings they made will be deposited in the Library of Congress. While Kostova was in Europe, the Berlin Wall collapsed, heralding the fall of Communism in Eastern Europe, events which shaped her understanding of history.

=== Composition and publication ===
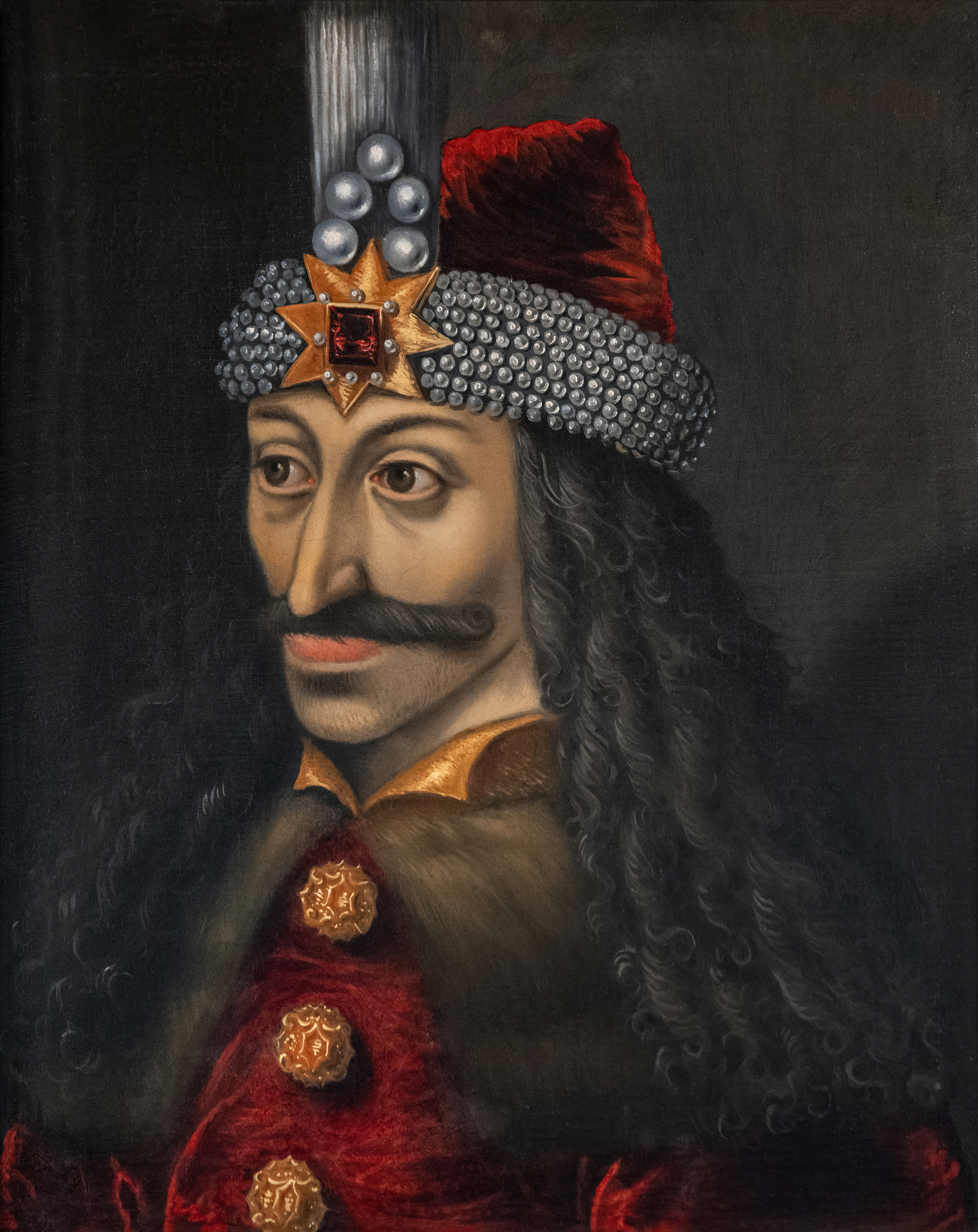
Kostova had her "eureka moment" when she realized that the location of Vlad Țepeș's remains was unknown.

Five years later, in 1994, when Kostova was hiking in the Appalachian Mountains with her husband, she had a flashback to those storytelling moments with her father and asked herself "what if the father were spinning his Dracula tales to his entranced daughter and Dracula were listening in? What if Dracula were still alive?" She immediately scratched out seven pages of notes into her writer's notebook. Two days later, she started work on the novel. At the time she was teaching English as a second language, creative writing and composition classes at universities in Philadelphia, Pennsylvania. She moved to Ann Arbor, Michigan, entered the writing program at the University of Michigan and finished the book as she was obtaining her Master of Fine Arts degree.

Kostova did extensive research about Eastern Europe and Vlad Țepeș. She found a vampire-killing kit at the Mercer Museum, which included a pistol, silver bullets, a crucifix, a wooden stake, and powdered garlic.

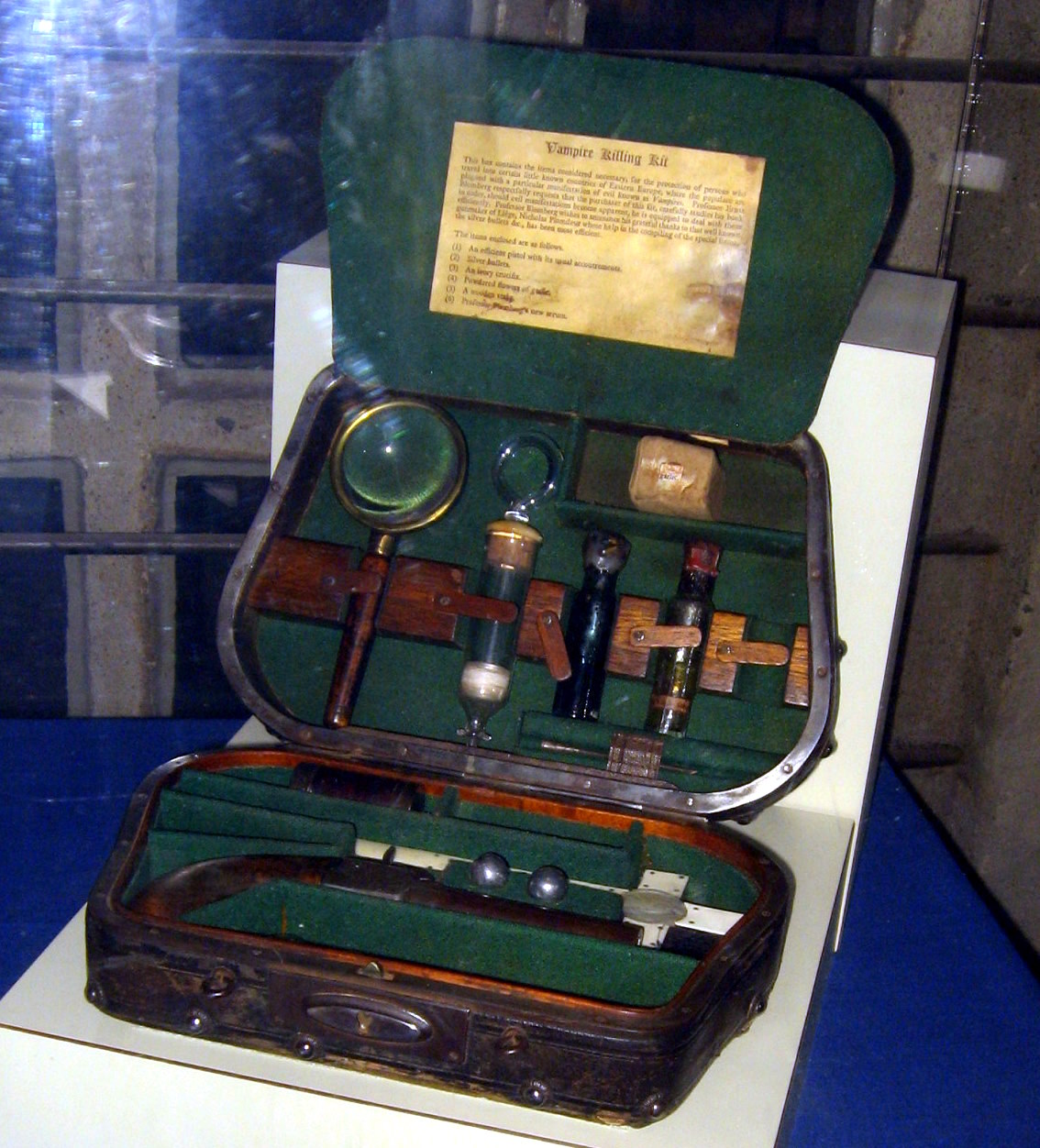
Vampire-killing kit at the Mercer Museum

As she was writing, she posted maps of Eastern Europe in her office and constructed a chart to help her keep track of the book's timelines. Her husband, whom she had met in Bulgaria, assisted her with related geographical descriptions and diction. It took her ten years to finish the novel.

Kostova finished the novel in January 2004 and sent it to a potential literary agent in March. Two months later and within two days of sending out her manuscript to publishers, Kostova was offered a deal – she refused it. The rights to the book were auctioned off and Little, Brown and Company bought them for US$2 million (US$30,000 is typical for a first novel from an unknown author). Publishers Weekly explained the high price as a result of a bidding war between firms' believing that they might have the next Da Vinci Code within their grasp. One vice-president and associate publisher said, "Given the success of The Da Vinci Code, everybody around town knows how popular the combination of thriller and history can be and what a phenomenon it can become." Little, Brown and Company subsequently sold the rights in 28 countries. The book was published in the United States on 14 June 2005.

== Genre and style ==
The Historian has been described as a combination of genres, including the Gothic novel, the adventure novel, the detective novel, the travelogue, the postmodern historical novel, the epistolary epic, and the historical thriller.

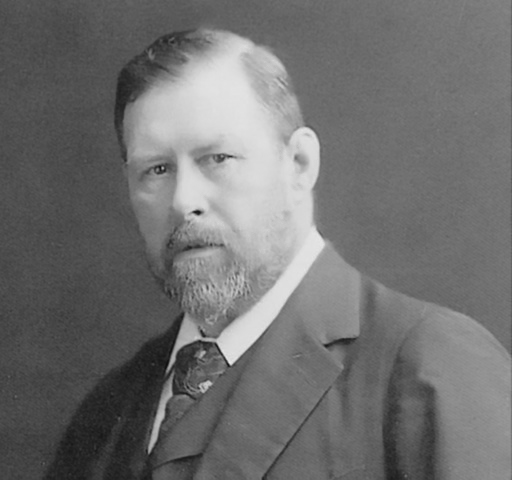
According to Kostova, Bram Stoker "created Dracula as a brilliant figure; a creature that is part monster and part genius. Dracula represents the best and worst of us."

Kostova wanted to write a serious literary novel, with scholarly heroes, that was at the same time reminiscent of 19th-century adventures. She was inspired by Victorian writers such as Wilkie Collins; his novel The Moonstone (1868), with its plot twists and bevy of narrators, was "a major model". The primary literary ancestor of The Historian, however, is Bram Stoker's Dracula (1897). For example, in The Historian and Dracula, the protagonist is both fascinated and repulsed by Dracula. Both are told through a series of letters and memoirs. The Historian also includes many intertextual references to Stoker's work – Dracula even owns a copy of the novel. Yet, Kostova shapes Dracula into her own character. While Stoker's vampire is the focus of his novel, Kostova's is at the edges. Moreover, the blend of the fictional Dracula and the historical Vlad "adds a sinister and frightening edge" to the character, according to scholar Stine Fletcher.

Despite its Gothic roots, The Historian is not suffused with violence nor is it a horror novel. Kostova aimed to write a "chilling" Victorian ghost story, and her realistic style is what creates this effect. Marlene Arpe of The Toronto Star praises Kostova's imagery in particular, quoting the following passage:

A smell rose from its pages that was not merely the delicate scent of aging paper and cracked vellum. It was a reek of decay, a terrible, sickening odor, a smell of old meat or corrupted flesh. I had never noticed it before and I leaned closer, sniffing, unbelieving, then shut the book. I reopened it, after a moment, and again stomach-churning fumes arose from its pages. The little volume seemed alive in my hands, yet it smelled like death.

As Peter Bebergal explains in The Boston Globe, "Instead of fetishizing blood, Kostova fetishizes documents (manuscripts, maps, letters) and the places that house them (libraries, archives and monasteries)." As one critic explains, "the real horror rests in the possibility of what Dracula truly is". For example, the narrator comments:

The thing that most haunted me that day, however, as I closed my notebook and put my coat on to go home, was not my ghostly image of Dracula, or the description of impalement, but the fact that these things had – apparently – actually occurred. If I listened too closely, I thought, I would hear the screams of the boys, of the 'large family' dying together. For all his attention to my historical education, my father had neglected to tell me this: history's terrible moments were real. I understand now, decades later, that he could never have told me. Only history itself can convince you of such a truth. And once you've seen that truth – really seen it – you can't look away.

The novel's tone and structure place it within the serious literary tradition for which Kostova was aiming. For example, the alternating timelines are suggestive of A. S. Byatt's Possession (1990) and the intermingling of academia and the occult suggests Arturo Perez-Reverte's The Club Dumas (1993). Although many reviewers compared The Historian to Dan Brown's historical thriller The Da Vinci Code (2003), Kostova has said her book "is part of a tradition where literary craft and experiments in form are all as important as action ... the only overlap is this idea of people searching for something in history. I'm still surprised when people make this comparison, I'm very grateful my publisher has never pushed it." Moreover, the only real historical personage in her novel is Vlad Țepeș and she changed the name of some locations "fearing some readers might confuse fantasy and reality, as they have with Brown's novels".

Reviewers praised Kostova's lush descriptions of the setting and the fascinating European cities and countries which the story traverses: Amsterdam, Slovenia, Romania, Bulgaria, Turkey, France, Oxford, Switzerland and Italy.

== Themes ==
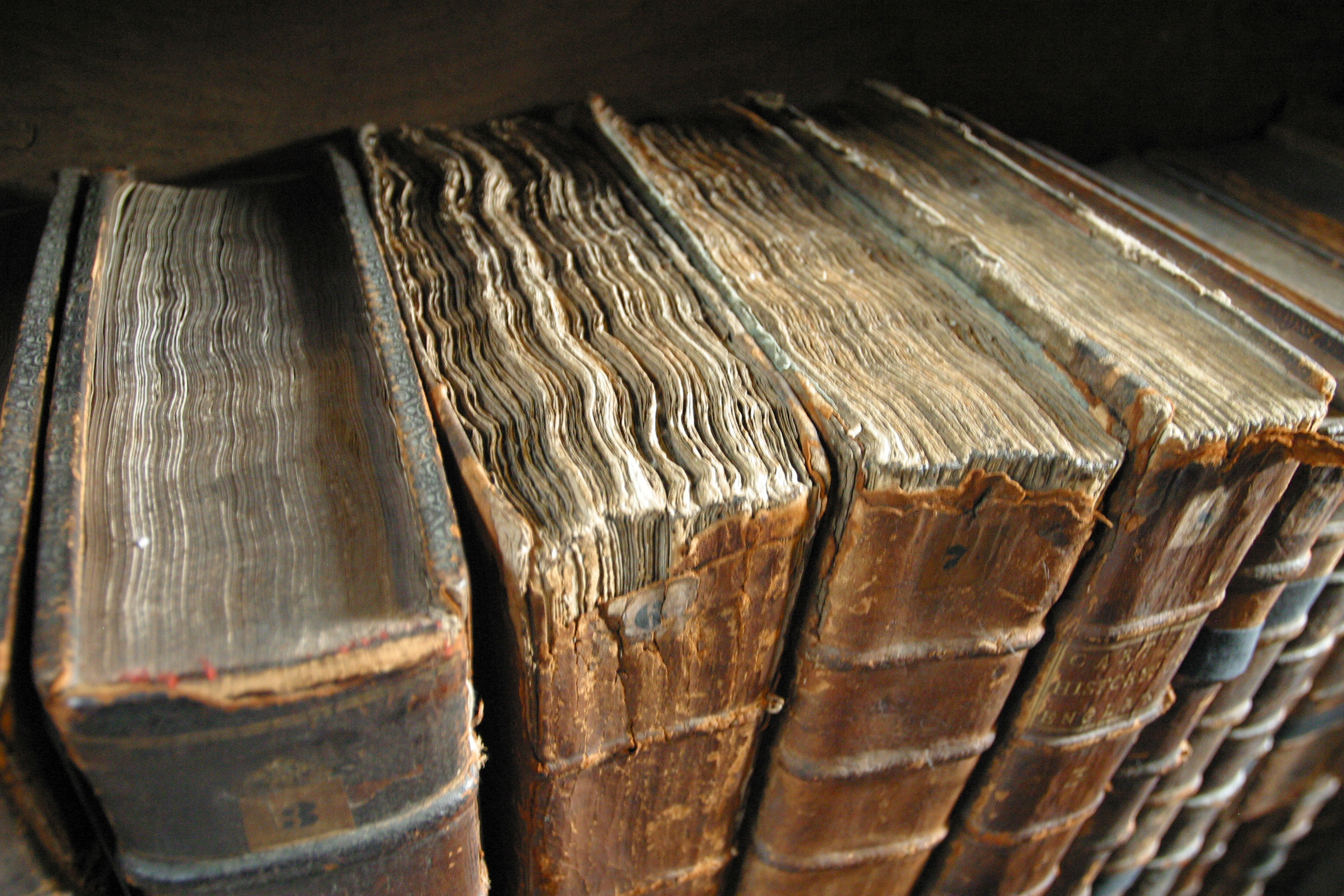
The Historian is suffused with "the sensual and intellectual pleasures to be found in dusty old libraries, with their leather-bound books and fading maps".

History and questions about its role in society pervade The Historian. In particular, the novel argues that knowledge of history is power, particularly as it is written in books. The title can refer to any of the major characters, including Dracula. As Nancy Baker explains in The Globe and Mail, the novel is "about the love of books" and the knowledge and comfort they offer the characters – even Dracula himself is a bibliophile. As one critic explains, the novel is specifically about the love of scholarship. At the heart of the novel is an exploration of "the power and price of scholarly obsession". As Paul explains in the novel:

It is a fact that we historians are interested in what is partly a reflection of ourselves we would rather not examine except through the medium of scholarship; it is also true that as we steep ourselves in our interests, they become more and more a part of us. Visiting an American university ... I was introduced to one of the first of the great American historians of Nazi Germany. He lived in a comfortable house at the edge of the campus, where he collected not only books on his topic but also the official china of the Third Reich. His dogs, two enormous German shepherds, patrolled the front yard day and night. Over drinks with other faculty members, he told me in no uncertain terms how he despised Hitler's crimes and wanted to expose them in the greatest possible detail to the outside world. I left the party early, walking carefully past those big dogs, unable to shake my revulsion.

The novel explores questions of good and evil and as Jessica Treadway states in The Chicago Tribune, it "is intriguing for its thorough examination of what constitutes evil and why it exists". For example, Dracula at one point asks Rossi:

History has taught us that the nature of man is evil, sublimely so. Good is not perfectible, but evil is. Why should you not use your great mind in service of what is perfectible? ... There is no purity like the purity of the sufferings of history. You will have what every historian wants: history will be reality to you. We will wash our minds clean with blood.

As Kostova explains, "Dracula is a metaphor for the evil that is so hard to undo in history." For example, he is shown influencing Eastern European tyrants and supporting national socialism in Transylvania. He is "vainglorious, vindictive, [and] vicious". As Michael Dirda explains in The Washington Post, the novel conveys the idea that "Most of history's worst nightmares result from an unthinking obedience to authority, high-minded zealotry seductively overriding our mere humanity." It is in the figure of the vampire that Kostova reveals this, since "our fear of Dracula lies in the fear of losing ourselves, of relinquishing our very identities as human beings". In fact, the narrator is never named in the novel, suggesting, as one critic explains, "that the quest for the dark side of human nature is more universal than specific to a concrete character".

Religion is also a dominant theme of The Historian. Dracula is Christian and, as Bebergal explains, "Much of what is frightening in the novel is the suggestion of heretical Christian practices and conspiratorial monks." Kostova herself notes that the world is still "wracked by religious conflict", therefore historical fiction about the topic is relevant. The portions of the novel set in Istanbul, for example, highlight the extent to which the real Vlad detested the Ottomans, waging holy war upon them. More specifically, Amir Taheri in Asharq Alawsat argues that the novel highlights the relationship between the West and Turkey. The West, which is laden with the "dead" weight of this past (represented by the vampires) needs the help of Turkey (and perhaps the entire Muslim world) to recover. As Taheri points out, one of the most appealing characters in the novel is Professor Bora, a Turkish professor who is part of an ancient Ottoman society dedicated to defeating Dracula. Taheri emphasizes that the novel highlights that "Western civilisation and Islam have common enemies represented by 'vampires' such as postmodernism in Europe and obscurantism in the Muslim world".

== Reception ==
The Historian amounts to something profound, messy, and wondrously mathematical at times ... We encounter obsession, possession, and the struggle against the brevity of life. It is an exploration of the eternal desire for intimacy. The innocent are as vulnerable as the woefully enlightened. They just do not know it yet.

— Saffron Burrows

Little, Brown and Company spent $500,000 heavily promoting The Historian. In what Publishers Weekly called a "carefully calibrated advertising campaign", 7,000 advance copies were sent to booksellers, and in January 2005 Kostova began her book promotion tour six months before the novel's publication. She met with book retailers who, impressed with her presentation, bought large numbers of the book. As an article in The Age explains, "By the time it arrived in the bookstores, The Historian had already made the news several times". As soon as the book was published in June, Kostova went on a 15-city tour, including book signings and readings, which prompted further media reports on it. She appeared on ABC's Good Morning America on 28 June, and there were stories about the novel in USA Today, Entertainment Weekly and Newsweek. Kostova was billed as the next literary phenomenon, the next Alice Sebold or Susanna Clarke.

The Historian was the first debut novel to land at number one on The New York Times bestseller list in its first week on sale, and as of 2005 was the fastest-selling hardback debut novel in U.S. history. The book sold more copies on its first day in print than The Da Vinci Code – 70,000 copies were sold in the first week alone. As of the middle of August 2005, the novel had already sold 915,000 copies in the U.S. and had gone through six printings. (For comparison, according to Publishers Weekly, only ten fiction books sold more than 800,000 hardcover copies in the US in 2004.) Little, Brown and Company also released an edition of Dracula in September 2005 with an introduction by Kostova, thinking her readers would want to delve into the original novel after reading hers. Kostova is one of the few female bestselling authors, but her popularity is unusual because it is founded on a literary novel.

Reviews of the novel were "at best, mixed". Several reviewers noted that Kostova described the setting of her novel well; Laura Miller of Salon.com, for example, wrote that "Kostova has a genius for evoking places". Malcolm Jones of Newsweek wrote that the novel was "strikingly fresh and unformulaic". Baker praised Kostova's prose, saying that it "has a leisurely grace". Francis Atkinson of The Age praised the "Gothic sensuality" of the novel. However, some thought the book was too long, or criticized Kostova's lack of tonal variety; Janet Maslin wrote in The New York Times that the book was "ponderous" and had a "contorted narrative structure". Jane Stevenson of The Observer agreed, noting that the multiple timelines and narrators of the novel were not sufficiently differentiated. Several reviewers complained that the climax of the novel was a disappointment and that Dracula was not terrifying.

According to Paul Wagenbreth of The News-Gazette, the novel's fundamental weakness is that after the slow buildup, "there is a final shying away from a full rendering of the nature of the beast. ... there's a curious holding back here as elsewhere from a really probing look at the seductive appeal of vampirism, particularly the sensuality at its core." Susanna Sturgis, agreed, writing in the Women's Review of Books that the plot dragged and that "the reader loses interest" in the core mysteries of the novel. Ong Sor Fern of The Straits Times criticized Kostova's portrayal of women, writing that her unnamed female narrator "feels even more drab and colourless than Stoker's idealised female, Mina Harker". Sturgis criticized Kostova's characterization in general, contending that the major characters seemed more like "disembodied tour guides". Polly Shulman of Newsday also argued that the book "fail[s] to grapple with its supposed themes: evil, death and history". She saw "little of the terror of these periods" in the novel and little of the tension between the Islamic East and the Christian West.

== Awards ==
Award	Year	Result
Hopwood Award for Novel-in-progress	2003	Winner
Quill Award for Debut Author of the Year	2005	Winner
International Horror Guild Award for Best Novel	2005	Nominated
Book Sense Award for Best Adult Fiction	2006	Winner

== Adaptations ==
=== Audio book ===
The 12-hour abridged audio book, released by Time Warner, is narrated by six different actors (Joanne Whalley, Martin Jarvis, Dennis Boutsikaris, Jim Ward, Rosalyn Landor and Robin Atkin Downes). Boutsikaris' voicing of Paul has been called "flat" while Publishers Weekly complained that it was "nonchalant and impersonal". They also singled out the voicing of Dracula for criticism, writing that "his accent and delivery is exactly the stereotypical vampire voice used by everyone from Bela Lugosi to Sesame Street's the Count". There is swelling orchestral music at the beginning and end of each chapter, of which the reviewers approved.

The 26-hour unabridged audio book, released by Books on Tape (a division of Random House), is narrated by Justine Eyre and Paul Michael. According to Booklist, they "do an incredible job voicing an array of characters with European accents ranging from Dutch, French, and German". Noting that the book is particularly suited for audio because it is told in letters, they praise Eyre's "earnest and innocent" tone in her voicing of the narrator and Michael's "clear characterizations".

=== Film ===
In 2005, prior to its publication, Sony bought the film rights to the novel for $1.5 million, but has yet to go into production.
