= Peggy Goodin =

American novelist (b. 1923, d. 1983)

- Born: May 18, 1923; Kansas City, Missouri, US
- Died: August 23, 1983 (aged 60)
- Education: A.B., University of Michigan (1945), M.A., McGill University (1949)
- Occupation: Novelist
- Years active: 1946–1954
- Organization: Chi Omega
- Awards: Hopwood Award (1942, 1943, 1945)

Peggy Louise Goodin (May 18, 1923 – August 23, 1983) was a best-selling American novelist and three-time Hopwood Award winner. Two of her novels were adapted into films.

== Life and career ==
Peggy Louise Goodin was born to Goldie Leona Shimp and James Lawrence Goodin, an automobile dealer, in Kansas City, Missouri, and grew up in Bluffton, Indiana. She later said that she spent her time in Bluffton "trying to make the boys' football team, winning medals for oratory, and annoying her teachers." Goodin was involved in literary pursuits from an early age, serving as the editor of her school paper and yearbook.

Goodin earned an A.B. from the University of Michigan in 1945. While there, she won the prestigious Hopwood Award in 1942, 1943, and 1945. Her final win was for the work that would become her first novel, Clementine, which she wrote in the basement of the Chi Omega house on campus.

On June 28, 1946, Goodin published Clementine with Dutton. The novel is a coming-of-age story about a red-haired tomboy named Clementine. In a starred review, Kirkus Reviews called it "a chronology with funny, tender highspots, that manages growing pains without parody or maudlinity," concluding that it was a "very pleasant, lightly subsurface tale of adolescence, which sneaks up on you." The novel was adapted into the film Mickey in 1948; subsequent printings of the book used both titles on the cover.

Goodin earned an M.A. from McGill University in 1949. While attending McGill, she wrote book reviews for the McGill Daily. Her second novel, Take Care of My Little Girl (Dutton, 1950), began as her masters thesis. In it, Goodin examines the racism, classism, and religious prejudice of Greek life on a college campus. She sold the film rights to the book for a reported $30,000. Take Care of My Little Girl was released as a film in 1951.

The Lie, about a mother who must pass her daughter off as her sister, was Dutton's top fiction title for the fall of 1953. However, Kirkus reviewed it with much less enthusiasm. Goodin's final novel, Dede O'Shea, was released by Dutton on May 29, 1957. Of its eponymous heroine, Kirkus wrote, "A ragingly young Californian makes a pleasant heroine with an addiction to truth -- and consequences."

== Works ==
- Clementine (1946) > reprinted and retitled after 1948 film adaptation Mickey
- Take Care of My Little Girl (1950), filmed as Take Care of My Little Girl (1951)
- The Lie (1953)
- Dede O'Shea (1957)
