= Hard Rock Harrigan =

1935 film directed by David Howard

- Directed by: David Howard
- Written by: Charles Furthman; Daniel Jarrett; Raymond L. Schrock
- Produced by: Sol Lesser; John Zanft
- Starring: George O'Brien; Irene Hervey; Fred Kohler
- Cinematography: Frank B. Good
- Edited by: Donald Barratt
- Music by: Hugo Riesenfeld
- Production company: Sol Lesser Productions Fox Film Corporation
- Distributed by: 20th Century-Fox Film Corporation
- Release date: July 1, 1935
- Running time: 60 minutes
- Country: United States
- Language: English

Hard Rock Harrigan is a 1935 American drama film directed by David Howard and starring George O'Brien, Irene Hervey and Fred Kohler.

== Cast ==
- George O'Brien as Tim 'Hard Rock' Harrigan
- Irene Hervey as 'Andy' Anderson
- Fred Kohler as Black Jack Riley
- Dean Benton as Michael McGinnis
- Frank Rice as McClintock - Superindendant
- Victor Potel as 'Big' Oscar
- Olin Francis as Clancy
- William Gould as Clark
- George Humbert as Columbo
- David Clyde as McNally
- Edward Keane as Dr. Wagner
- Lee Shumway as Casey

== Bibliography ==
- George A. Katchmer. Eighty Silent Film Stars: Biographies and Filmographies of the Obscure to the Well Known. McFarland, 1991.
