= Richard Cohen (novelist) =

American novelist (born 1952)

- Born: 1952 (age 73–74)
- Education: University of Michigan
- Occupations: Novelist, textbook writer
- Spouse: Ann Althouse (divorced)
- Children: 4
- Writing career
- Years active: 1973–2010
- Genre: Fiction
- Notable work: Domestic Tranquility, Don't Mention the Moon, and Say You Want Me
- Notable awards: Hopwood Award for Major Fiction (1973)

Richard Lawrence Cohen (born 1952) is an American novelist. His novels include Domestic Tranquility (1980), Don't Mention the Moon (1983), and Say You Want Me (1988).

== Education ==
Cohen was raised in the Bronx. He is a graduate of the University of Michigan, where he won the Hopwood Award for major fiction in 1973.

== Writing ==
Cohen sold his debut novel, Domestic Tranquility, the day before he was scheduled to start law school. The book was published by Seaview in 1980 to positive reviews. The book—which one reviewer noted was, "unlike most first novels, not overtly autobiographical"—was told from multiple perspectives about a multi-generational family in Connecticut.

Cohen's second book, Don't Mention the Moon, was a comic novel whose protagonist is an unemployed liberal-arts graduate who seeks employment in business. The book was poorly received, with reviewers calling it "sophomoric" and a "semi-intellectual mind-trip...that ends at the same place it began." One reviewer said "it might as well be a first novel, and that's not a compliment."

In 1988, Cohen published Say You Want Me, about an illustrator who cares for his toddler son as a stay-at-home dad and cheats on his wife, a corporate executive, with a woman he meets at the playground. Publishers Weekly called it "haunting and beautifully written" and the Chicago Tribune's reviewer said the reader "hears echoes of O'Hara, Cheever and an earlier, kinder Updike."

Cohen has also published a collection of short fiction called Pronoun Music in 2001 and a textbook on fiction writing.

== Personal life ==
Cohen has been married twice and has four sons. Cohen's first marriage was to law professor Ann Althouse.
