= Mickey (1948 film) =

1948 film by Ralph Murphy

- Directed by: Ralph Murphy
- Screenplay by: Muriel Roy Bolton; Agnes Christine Johnston
- Based on: Clementine by Peggy Goodin
- Produced by: Aubrey Schenck
- Starring: Lois Butler; Bill Goodwin; Irene Hervey; John Sutton; Hattie McDaniel
- Cinematography: John W. Boyle
- Edited by: Norman Colbert
- Music by: Marlin Skiles
- Production company: Aubrey Schenck Productions
- Distributed by: Eagle-Lion Films
- Release date: June 23, 1948
- Running time: 87 minutes
- Country: United States
- Language: English
- Budget: $700,000

Mickey is a 1948 American coming-of-age comedy drama film directed by Ralph Murphy and starring Lois Butler, Bill Goodwin, Skip Homeier and Academy Award-winning actress Hattie McDaniel. The film was based on the novel Clementine by Peggy Goodin and was filmed in Cinecolor. The film's sets were designed by the art director Edward L. Ilou.

== Plot ==
The plotline involves a young tomboy named Mickey (Butler) with a beautiful singing voice, who is torn between singing and playing on her baseball team. Meanwhile, Mickey is trying to make her widowed father fall in love with her neighbor's aunt, Louise (Hervey), a woman who is helping Mickey try to be more ladylike so she can become her best friend's love interest.

== Cast ==
Actor	Role
Lois Butler	Mickey Kelly
Bill Goodwin	George R. Kelly
Irene Hervey	Louise Williams
John Sutton	Ted Whitney
Rose Hobart	Lydia Matthews
Hattie McDaniel	Bertha
Skippy Homeier	Hank Evans
Beverly Wills	Cathy Williams
Leon Tyler	Robbie Matthews
