= Irene Hervey =

American film, stage, and television actress (1909–1998)

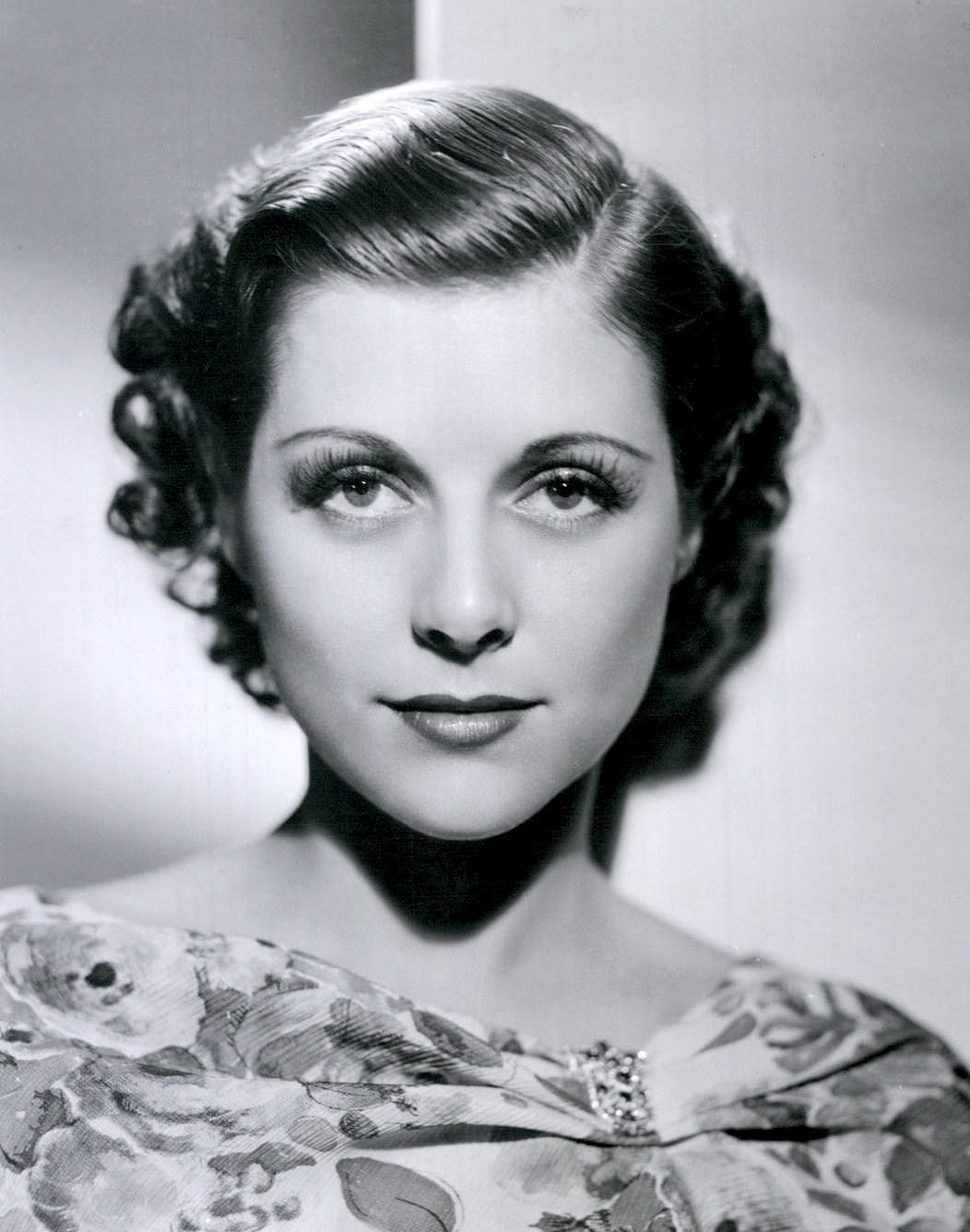
- Hervey in 1937
- Born: Beulah Irene Herwick; July 11, 1909; Venice, California, U.S.
- Died: December 20, 1998 (aged 89); Woodland Hills, California, U.S.
- Education: Venice High School
- Occupation: Actress
- Years active: 1933-1981
- Spouses: William Fenderson (m. 1929; div. 1933) Allan Jones (m. 1936; div. 1957)
- Children: 2, including Jack Jones

Irene Hervey (born Beulah Irene Herwick; July 11, 1909 – December 20, 1998) was an American film, stage, and television actress who appeared in over 50 films and numerous television series spanning her five-decade career.

A native of Los Angeles, Hervey was trained in her youth by British stage and film actress Emma Dunn, a friend of her mother's. She signed a contract with Metro-Goldwyn-Mayer in 1933, appearing in several films for the studio–including The Stranger's Return (1933), opposite Lionel Barrymore, before landing a supporting role as Valentine de Villefort in United Artists' The Count of Monte Cristo (1934). She signed a contract with Universal Pictures, appearing in numerous films for the studio, including the Western Destry Rides Again (1939) opposite Jimmy Stewart and Marlene Dietrich, the mystery The House of Fear (1939), and the musical The Boys from Syracuse (1940), the last of which she appeared opposite her then-husband Allan Jones.

She appeared in films throughout the 1940s into the 1950s, including the horror film Night Monster (1942) opposite Bela Lugosi, the fantasy Mr. Peabody and the Mermaid (1948), and the film noir A Cry in the Night (1956). Beginning in the mid-1950s, Hervey transitioned to television, appearing as a guest star on Perry Mason, Honey West, and My Three Sons, the last of which earned her a Primetime Emmy Award nomination for Outstanding Single Performance by an Actress in a Supporting Role. Hervey appeared in occasional minor film roles in her later career, such as Gene Saks's Cactus Flower (1969) and Clint Eastwood's thriller Play Misty for Me (1971).

Hervey died of heart failure in 1998. She had two children, one of whom was pop singer Jack Jones.

== Early life ==
Hervey was born Beulah Irene Herwick on July 11, 1909, in the Venice neighborhood of Los Angeles. Her father was a sign painter, and her mother a Christian Science practitioner whose pupil was English actress Emma Dunn. Dunn agreed to become Hervey's acting coach during her childhood. Hervey attended Venice High School, where she appeared in school theater productions.

== Career ==
=== Early films ===
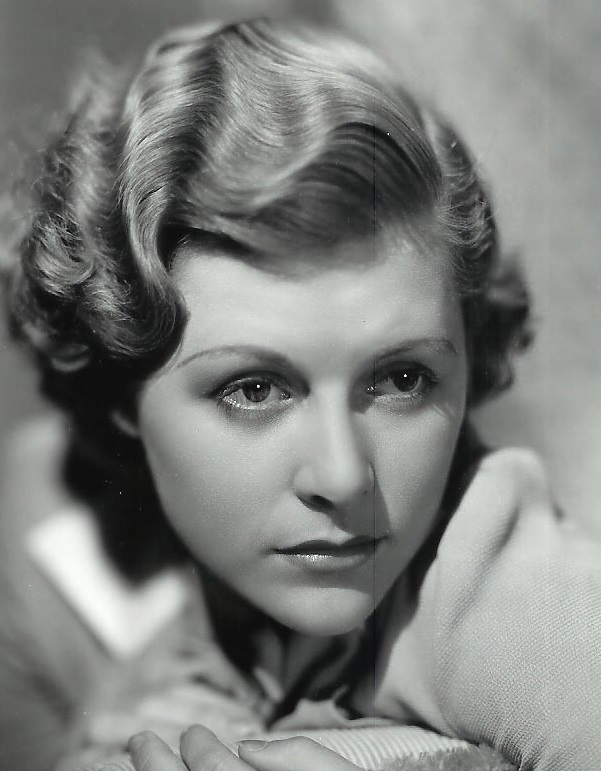
Hervey in 1934

She began her acting career after being introduced to a casting agent from Metro-Goldwyn-Mayer (MGM). After a successful screen test, she was signed by the studio and made her screen debut in the 1933 film The Stranger's Return, opposite Lionel Barrymore.

Though signed by MGM, Hervey was loaned by the studio and appeared in several films including United Artists' The Count of Monte Cristo (1934) and With Words and Music, released by Grand National Films Inc. In 1934, she was cast as the murderess Myra in the thriller Rendezvous at Midnight, but was replaced by Irene Ware.

In 1936, Hervey left MGM and signed with Universal Pictures. While at Universal, Hervey appeared in The League of Frightened Men (1937) and Destry Rides Again (1939) with Marlene Dietrich and James Stewart. She also intermittently freelanced at other studios, appearing in such films as Grand National Pictures' The Girl Said No (1937), a musical comedy featuring music by Gilbert and Sullivan.

At Universal from 1940 to 1943, Hervey had the lead in 11 B pictures, one A (The Boys from Syracuse) and one serial (Gang Busters).

In 1943, Hervey was seriously injured in a car accident and was forced to retire from acting for five years. Though she did briefly return to acting for the stage play No Way Out, where she played Dr. Enid Karley, in 1944.

=== Later career ===
Hervey returned to acting in 1948 with the film Mickey, followed by Mr. Peabody and the Mermaid. By the early 1950s, she began appearing in television. Throughout the 1950s and early 1960s, Hervey appeared in several television series, including the crime dramas Richard Diamond, Private Detective, Peter Gunn, and Hawaiian Eye. She also made three guest appearances on Perry Mason: in 1958, she played Helen Bartlett in "The Case of the Black-Eyed Blonde"; in 1961, she played Grace Davies in "The Case of the Jealous Journalist", and in 1963, she played Jill Garson in "The Case of the Lawful Lazarus". She returned to theater with a role opposite Hans Conried in Take Her, She's Mine, a comedy written by Henry and Phoebe Ephron, which had regional performances in Massachusetts and Connecticut in the summer of 1963. A reviewer from a local publication noted that Hervey "registers effectively" in her role. In 1965, she landed a regular role on The Young Marrieds, followed by a stint on the short-lived Anne Francis series Honey West as the titular character's Aunt Meg.

In 1969, Hervey was nominated for an Emmy Award for Outstanding Single Performance by an Actress in a Supporting Role for her appearance on My Three Sons. After her roles as Mrs. Durant in the comedy Cactus Flower and as Madge in the 1971 thriller film Play Misty for Me with Clint Eastwood, Hervey retired from acting. She took a job working at a travel agency in Sherman Oaks and briefly returned to acting in 1978 with a role in Charlie's Angels. In 1981, she made her last on-screen appearance in the television movie Goliath Awaits, which centers on a community of survivors from a World War II shipwreck who have survived decades living underwater.

== Personal life ==
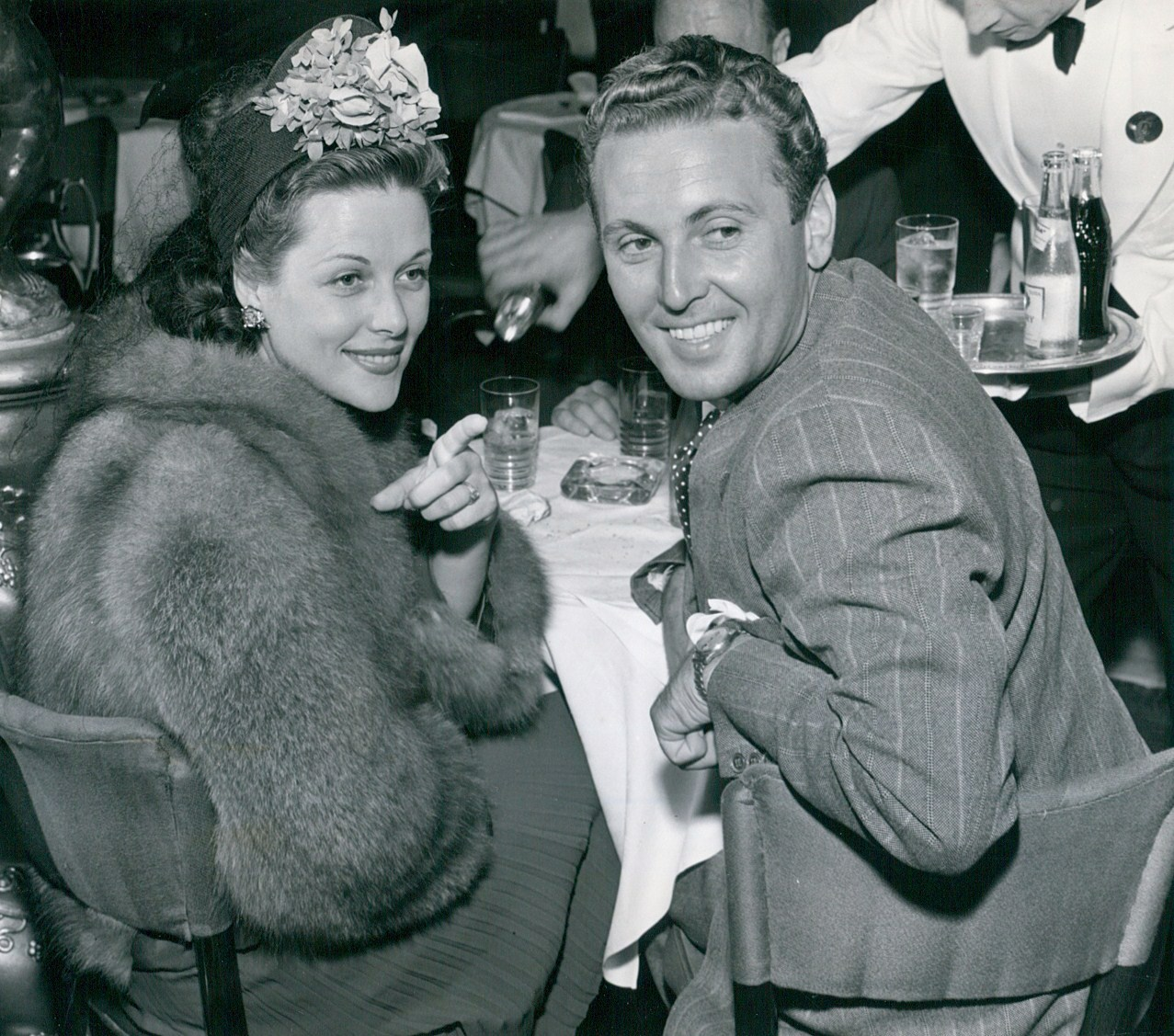
Hervey with second husband Allan Jones, 1941.

In 1929, Hervey married musician William Fenderson, with whom she had a daughter, Gail (1930–2020). The pair divorced in 1933. In the mid-1930s, she was engaged to Robert Taylor. In 1936, she met and married actor Allan Jones. The couple had a son, Jack Jones (1938–2024). They divorced in 1957.

== Death ==
Hervey died of heart failure on December 20, 1998; she was 89 and was residing at the Motion Picture & Television Country House and Hospital in Woodland Hills. She was cremated, and her ashes returned to her surviving daughter.

== Legacy ==
For her contribution to the motion picture industry, Hervey has a star on the Hollywood Walk of Fame at 6336 Hollywood Boulevard.

== Filmography ==
=== Film ===
Year	Title	Role	Notes	Ref.
1933	The Stranger's Return	Nettie Crane		
1933	Turn Back the Clock		Uncredited	
1933	The Women in His Life	Doris Worthing		
1934	Three on a Honeymoon	Millicent Wells		
1934	Hollywood Party	Show Girl	Uncredited	
1934	Let's Try Again	Marge Phelps		
1934	The Count of Monte Cristo	Valentine de Villefort		
1934	The Dude Ranger	Anne Hepburn		
1935	The Winning Ticket	Mary Tomasello		
1935	Motive for Revenge	Muriel Webster King		
1935	Honeymoon Limited	Judy Randall		
1935	Hard Rock Harrigan	'Andy' Anderson		
1935	His Night Out	Peggy Taylor		
1935	Charlie Chan in Shanghai	Diana Woodland		
1935	A Thrill for Thelma	Thelma Black	Short film; uncredited	
1935	White Lies	Mary Mallory		
1936	Three Godfathers	Molly	Also known as: Miracle in the Sand	
1936	Absolute Quiet	Laura Tait		
1936	Along Came Love	Emmy Grant		
1937	Woman in Distress	Irene Donovan		
1937	The League of Frightened Men	Evelyn Hibbard		
1937	The Girl Said No	Pearl Proctor / Peep-Bo		
1937	The Lady Fights Back	Heather McHale		
1938	Say It in French	Auriol Marsden		
1938	Society Smugglers	Joan Martin		
1939	East Side of Heaven	Mona Barrett		
1939	The House of Fear	Alice Tabor		
1939	Missing Evidence	Linda Parker		
1939	Destry Rides Again	Janice Tyndall		
1940	Three Cheers for the Irish	Heloise Casey		
1940	The Crooked Road	Louise Dalton		
1940	The Boys from Syracuse	Adriana		
1940	The San Francisco Docks	Kitty Tracy		
1941	Mr. Dynamite	Vicki Martin		
1942	Bombay Clipper	Frankie Gilroy Wilson		
1942	Frisco Lil	Lillian Grayson / Frisco Lil		
1942	Unseen Enemy	Gen Rand		
1942	Gang Busters	Vicki Logan		
1942	Halfway to Shanghai	Vicky Neilson		
1942	Destination Unknown	Elena Varnoff		
1942	Night Monster	Dr. Lynne Harper		
1942	Keeping Fit	Irene - Dick's Wife	Short film	
1943	He's My Guy	Terry Allen		
1946	Studio Visit			
1948	Mickey	Louise Williams		
1948	Mr. Peabody and the Mermaid	Mrs. Polly Peabody		
1949	The Lucky Stiff	Mrs. Eve Childers		
1949	Manhandled	Ruth / Mrs. Alton Bennet		
1949	Chicago Deadline	Belle Dorset		
1956	A Cry in the Night	Helen Taggart		
1956	Teenage Rebel	Helen Sheldon McGowan		
1958	Going Steady	Grace Turner		
1958	Crash Landing	Bernice Willouby		
1960	O'Conner's Ocean	Victoria Arden	Television film	
1969	Cactus Flower	Mrs. Durant		
1969	Roberta	Mrs. Teale	Television film	
1971	Play Misty for Me	Madge Brenner		
1981	Goliath Awaits	Carrie	Television film	

=== Television ===
Year	Title	Role	Notes
1952	The Gulf Playhouse		Episode: "Our Two Hundred Children"
1953–55	The Pepsi-Cola Playhouse		2 episodes
1953–56	Lux Video Theatre	Susan Arnold / Lucille / Patricia	4 episodes
1954–55	Fireside Theatre	Miss Vickers / Louise	2 episodes
1954	Stage 7	Fran Abbelard	Episode: "The Time of Day"
1954	The Lone Wolf	Mae East	Episode: "The Runaway Story (a.k.a. Death of a Lawyer)"
1955	Studio 57	Ann Randall	2 episodes
1955	The Public Defender	Mrs. Harris	Episode: "Mama's Boy"
1955–57	Climax!	Nancy Blount	2 episodes
1955–58	The George Burns and Gracie Allen Show	Clara Bagley / Florence Henderson	5 episodes
1955–58	Matinee Theatre	Margaret March / Stella Martyn / Myra Gordon	8 episodes
1955	Damon Runyon Theater		Episode: "Small Town Caper"
1956	The Millionaire	Maxine	Episode: "The Candy Caldwell Story"
1956	Sneak Preview		Episode: "The Way Back"
1956	The Charles Farrell Show	Mrs. Andrews	Episode: "Charlie's Love Secret"
1957	Circus Boy	Martha Neilson	Episode: "Farewell to the Circus"
1957	Panic!	Gretchen Beresford	Episode: "Two Martinis"
1958	Studio One	Beth Byrnes	Episode: "The Lonely Stage"
1958–63	Perry Mason	Jill Garson / Grace Davies / Helen Bartlett	3 episodes
1959	Playhouse 90	Mrs. McBurnie	Episode: "A Quiet Game of Cards"
1959	Richard Diamond, Private Detective	Mary Forsythe	Episode: "The Sport"
1959	The Ann Sothern Show	Lorraine	Episode: "The Ugly Bonnet"
1959	The Donna Reed Show	Louise Collier	Episode: "A Penny Earned"
1960	Bourbon Street Beat	Alice Nichols	Episode: "False Identity"
1960	Markham	Mrs. Franklin	Episode: "The Silken Cord"
1960	Thriller	Mrs. Edith Pettit	Episode: "The Watcher"
1960	The Case of the Dangerous Robin	Thelma Henderson	Episode: "Temporary Window"
1961	Peter Gunn	Madelon Ridgely	Episode: "Blind Item"
1961	The DuPont Show with June Allyson	Gladys	Episode: "The Guilty Heart"
1961	Shirley Temple's Storybook	Esperanza	Episode: "The Princess and the Goblins"
1961	Surfside 6	Mrs. Gardner	Episode: "Little Mister Kelly"
1961–62	Hawaiian Eye	Mary Kirk / Marjorie Lloyd / Harriet Regan	3 episodes
1962	Target: The Corruptors	Nora Tremaine	Episode: "One for the Road"
1962	Follow the Sun	Jeanette	Episode: "The Last of the Big Spenders"
1962	77 Sunset Strip	Ellen Gilmore	Episode: "Framework for the Badge"
1962	The Wide Country	Dorothy Stannard	Episode: "Our Ernie Kills People"
1962	Dr. Kildare	Martha Kildare	Episode: "An Ancient Office"
1963	The Eleventh Hour	Valerie Prentice	Episode: "The Wings of Morning"
1964	The Twilight Zone	Martha Tillman	Episode: "Black Leather Jackets"
1964	Burke's Law	Mrs. Tilson	Episode: "Who Killed April?"
1964	The Baileys of Balboa	Marie	Episode: "Won't You Come Home, Sam Bailey"
1964–65	The Young Marrieds	Irene Forsythe #1	
1965–66	Honey West	Aunt Meg	16 episodes
1967	Love on a Rooftop	Helen Cavendish	Episode: "One Too Many Cooks"
1968	Ironside	Margaret Whitfield	Episode: "Reprise"
1968	The Mod Squad	Mrs. Sanderson	Episode: "A Quiet Weekend in the Country"
1968–70	Family Affair	Mrs. Eldridge / Miss Scranton	2 episodes
1969–72	My Three Sons	Sylvia Anderson / Beatrice Brady	2 episodes Nominated – Primetime Emmy Award for Outstanding; Single Performance by an Actress in a Supporting Role
1976	Most Wanted	Mrs. Morrison	Episode: "The Ten-Percenter"
1978	Charlie's Angels	Samantha McKendrick	Episode: "The Jade Trap"
1979	Delta House	Trustee	Episode: "The Fall of Dean Wormer"

== Stage credits ==
Year	Title	Role	Venue(s)	Notes	Ref(s).
1944	No Way Out	Dr. Enid Karley	Cort Theatre	Broadway production	
1963	Take Her, She's Mine	Anne Michaelson	Westport Country Playhouse; The Cape Playhouse (Cape Cod)	Regional touring production	

== Works cited ==
- Halliwell, Leslie (1996). Halliwell's Film Guide. HarperPerennial. ISBN 978-0-062-73372-6.
- Lentz, Harris M. (1999). Obituaries in the Performing Arts. McFarland & Company. ISBN 978-0-786-40748-4.
- Mayer, Geoff (2017). Encyclopedia of American Film Serials. McFarland. ISBN 978-1-476-62719-9.
- Roberts, Jerry (2003). The Great American Playwrights on the Screen: A Critical Guide to Film, Video, and DVD. Hal Leonard Corporation. ISBN 978-1-557-83512-3.
