= Night Monster =

1942 film by Ford Beebe

- Theatrical release poster
- Directed by: Ford Beebe
- Written by: Clarence Upson Young
- Produced by: Ford Beebe
- Starring: Bela Lugosi; Lionel Atwill
- Cinematography: Charles Van Enger
- Edited by: Jack Otterson
- Music by: Hans J. Salter
- Distributed by: Universal Pictures
- Release date: October 23, 1942 (U.S.)
- Running time: 73 minutes
- Country: United States
- Language: English

Night Monster is a 1942 American black-and-white horror film featuring Bela Lugosi and produced and distributed by Universal Pictures Company. The movie uses an original story and screenplay by Clarence Upson Young and was produced and directed by Ford Beebe. For box office value, star billing was given to Bela Lugosi and Lionel Atwill, but the lead roles were played by Ralph Morgan, Irene Hervey and Don Porter, with Atwill in a character role as a pompous doctor who becomes a victim to the title character, and Lugosi in a small part as a butler.

The film is in many respects a remake of Doctor X, with virtually the same denouement. Both films also feature Atwill as a doctor.

== Plot ==
In a small town bordering a swampy region, unexplained murders and rumors of mysterious happenings surround the swamp-based home of the reclusive but respected Kurt Ingston. Ingston uses a wheelchair and has invited to his home the three doctors who were trying to cure him when his paralysis set in. Already in the household are his grim-humored butler Rolf; a lecherous chauffeur, Laurie; a mannish housekeeper, Miss Judd; an Eastern mystic, Agar Singh; and Ingston's allegedly mentally ill sister, Margaret. Outside, the gate is watched by a shriveled old hunchback called Torque.

Coincident with the arrival of the three male physicians is the appearance of a lady psychiatrist, Dr. Lynne Harper, summoned secretly by Margaret to prove she is not insane and help her secure freedom from the control of Ingston and Miss Judd. She arrives accompanied by a neighbor: mystery-writer Dick Baldwin, who rescued her after her car broke down in the swamp. Neither Ingston nor Miss Judd welcome her presence, but must contend with keeping her overnight until her car can be repaired.

Following dinner, at which Ingston's conviction becomes evident that the three doctors are directly responsible for his current condition, the party witnesses an exhibition of materialization of a Sicilian skeleton by Agar Singh. Dr. Harper is forbidden to meet with Margaret. Then, one by one, the doctors are frightfully killed as they prepare for bed. Suspecting Ingston, Dick and Police Captain Beggs confront him in his room, but discover he is not paralyzed but a triple amputee. Suspicion then falls on Laurie, who was last seen driving a murdered ex-employee of the household back to town, but he, too, winds up dead.

Ultimately, Dick confronts the killer outside the estate as he menaces Lynne, and discovers it is Ingston after all: by studying under Agar Singh, he has learned how to materialize arms and legs, hands and feet for himself, long enough to accomplish his evil deeds. As Dick struggles with him to the death, Margaret sets fire to the unholy house, committing suicide while taking the malevolent Miss Judd with her. As the house burns to the ground, Dick and Lynne are saved by Agar Singh when Singh shoots Ingston.

== Cast ==
Actor	Role
Ralph Morgan	Kurt Ingston
Irene Hervey	Dr. Lynne Harper
Don Porter	Dick Baldwin
Fay Helm	Margaret Ingston
Nils Asther	Agar Singh
Leif Erickson	Laurie
Doris Lloyd	Sarah Judd
Robert Homans	Police Captain "Cap" Beggs
Lionel Atwill	Dr. King
Frank Reicher	Dr. Timmons
Francis Pierlot	Dr. Phipps
Bela Lugosi	Rolf
Cyril Delavanti	Torque
Janet Shaw	Millie

== Production ==
The working title for the film was 'House of Mystery'. Production started on July 6, 1942, and ended at the end of the same month.

== Release ==
The film was released in the United States on October 23, 1942. The hairy hands and feet which Kurt Ingston materializes are the same makeup and props used in The Wolf Man (1941 film), created by Jack Pierce.

=== Home media ===
The film was released on VHS by Universal Studios Home Entertainment on August 8, 1995. The studio would release the film for the first time on DVD September 13, 2009 as a part of its two-disk "Universal Horror: Classic Movie Archive". It was later released by Willette Acquisition Corporation on March 17, 2015.

The film was released on Blu-ray by Eureka Entertainment in the UK in 2023 as part of a two-disk compilation of Universal films called Creeping Horror, with a commentary track by Kim Newman and Jonathan Rigby.

== Reception ==
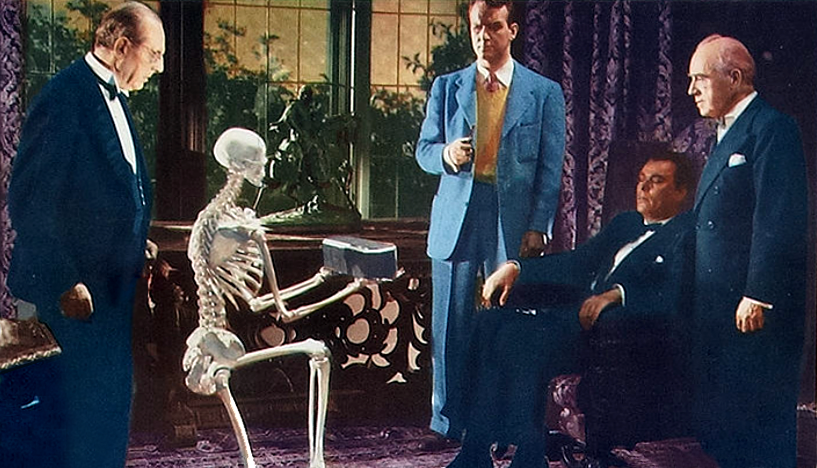
Colored publicity shot featuring Francis Pierlot, Don Porter, Nils Asther and Frank Reicher.

The New York Times gave the film a negative review, calling it "tedious and fantastic". Author and film critic Leonard Maltin awarded the film two and a half out of four stars, calling it an "intriguing grade-B thriller". On his website Fantastic Movie Musings and Ramblings, Dave Sindelar called it one of his favorites among Universal's minor horror films, commending the film's use of sound as being quite effective. Craig Butler from Allmovie wrote, "there's a lot that's wrong with Night Monster -- but there's also a fair amount of pleasure to be had from this admittedly-second tier Universal horror flick, especially for those who can't get enough of this kind of picture." Graeme Clark from The Spinning Image gave the film 6/10 stars, calling it "[a] minor but not unenjoyable chiller". TV Guide awarded the film 2/5 stars, stating that the film was only "Somewhat creepy".
