= Hopwood Award =

University of Michigan scholarship program

The Hopwood Awards are a major scholarship program at the University of Michigan, founded by Avery Hopwood.

Under the terms of the will of Avery Hopwood, a prominent American dramatist and member of the class of 1905 of the University of Michigan, one-fifth of Mr. Hopwood's estate was given to the regents for the encouragement of creative work in writing. The first awards were made in 1931, and today, the Hopwood Program offers around $120,000 in prizes every year to aspiring writers at the University of Michigan. According to Nicholas Delbanco, UM English professor and former director of the Hopwood Awards Program, "This is the oldest and best-known series of writing prizes in the country, and it is a very good indicator of future success."

== Contests and prizes ==
=== The Graduate and Undergraduate Hopwood Contests ===
Awards are offered in these genres: drama/screenplay, essay, the novel, short fiction, nonfiction, and poetry. These awards are classified under two categories, graduate or undergraduate, except the novel and drama/screenplay, which are combined categories. Award amounts for this contest vary, but usually fall in the range of $1000 to $6000.

=== Summer Hopwood Contest ===
The Summer Hopwood Contest was discontinued in 2017, but archives of winning Summer Hopwood manuscripts continue to be held in the Hopwood Room. When it ran, the contest was open only to students who took writing courses during spring and summer terms. Awards were given in the categories of drama or screenplay, nonfiction, short fiction, and poetry. Novels were not eligible for the Summer Hopwood Contest.

=== Hopwood Underclassmen Contest ===
This contest is open only to freshmen and sophomores who are enrolled in writing courses. Awards are given in the categories of nonfiction, fiction, and poetry.

== Hopwood Program ==
The Hopwood Program administers the Hopwood Award, and several other awards in writing. It is located in the Hopwood Room at the University of Michigan and serves the needs and interests of Hopwood contestants. The room was established by Professor Roy W. Cowden, director of the Hopwood Awards from 1933 to 1952, who generously contributed a part of his library, which has grown through the addition of many volumes of contemporary literature. In addition to housing the winning manuscripts from the past years of the contests, the Hopwood Room has a lending library of 20th-century literature, a generous supply of noncirculating current periodicals, some reference books on how to get published, information on graduate and summer writing programs, and a collection of screen plays donated by former Hopwood winner Lawrence Kasdan.

== Prizes administered by the Hopwood Program ==
The Hopwood Program also administers these writing contests:

- The Kasdan Scholarship in Creative Writing
- Arthur Miller Award of the U-M Club of New York Scholarship
- The Jeffery L. Weisberg Poetry Prize
- The Chamberlain Award for Creative Writing
- The Dennis McIntyre Poetry Prize
- The Andrea Beauchamp Prize
- The Helen S. and John Wagner Prize
- The Robert F. Haugh Prize
- The Meader Family Award
- The Naomi Saferstein Literary Award
- The Leonard and Eileen Newman Writing Prizes
- The Paul and Sonia Handleman Poetry Award
- The Keith Taylor Award for Excellence in Poetry

== Notable Hopwood winners ==
- Max Apple, (BA 1963). Author of: "The Oranging of America" (1976, short stories), "Zip: A Novel of the Left and the Right" (1978, novel), "Three Stories" (1983, short stories), "Free Agents" (1984, novel), "The Propheteers: A Novel" (1987, novel), "Roommates: My Grandfather's Story" (1994, biography, of Apple's grandfather)
- Brett Ellen Block, (BFA) award-winning short story author and novelist.
- Victoria Chang, (BA 1992) poet and children's writer. Recipient of 2017 Guggenheim Fellowship.
- John Ciardi, (MA 1939) author of: A Browser's Dictionary, A Second Browser's Dictionary, A Third Browser's Dictionary, The Collected Poems of John Ciardi, Good Words to You: An All-New Dictionary and Native's Guide to the Unknown, American Language, How Does a Poem Mean?, His translation of The Inferno, Limericks (with Isaac Asimov), You Read to Me, I'll Read to You, (illustrated by Edward Gorey)
- Richard Cohen (BA 1973). Novelist.
- Harold Courlander, (BA 1931) First winner of the award & author of The African, on which much of Roots was later based.
- Christopher Paul Curtis (BA 1999) Newbery and Coretta Scott King award-winning author of: The Watsons Go To Birmingham-1963 (1996, novel), Bud, Not Buddy (1999, novel), Elijah Of Buxton (2006, novel)
- Rebecca Frazier, (BA 1998), bluegrass singer. Received the award twice.
- Mary Gaitskill, (BA) Bad Behavior (1988), Two Girls, Fat and Thin (1991), Because They Wanted To (1997) (stories), Veronica (2005).
- Peggy Goodin, (AB 1945) author of Clemetine, Take Care of My Little Girl; novels adapted multiple times to film
- Steve Hamilton, (BA 1983), author of "Blood Is the Sky", "North of Nowhere", "A Cold Day in Paradise", "Winter of the Wolf Moon", "The Hunting Wind", "North of Nowhere", and "Ice Run". "A Cold Day In Paradise," won the 1999 Edgar Allan Poe Award, one of the mystery genre's most prestigious awards.
- Cynthia Haven, author of "Czesław Miłosz: A California Life" (2021) nominated for a Northern California Book Award, and "Evolution of Desire: A Life of René Girard" (2018).
- Robert Hayden, (M.A. 1944). Former Poet Laureate of the United States.
- Garrett Hongo, a finalist for the 1989 Pulitzer Prize for Poetry and winner of the 1987 Lamont Poetry Prize.
- Lawrence Kasdan (MA) three-times Academy Awards-nominated screenwriter and director.
- Laura Kasischke (BA 1983, M.F.A. 1987) winner of the National Book Critics Circle Award for Poetry and a Pushcart prize.
- Jane Kenyon, (BA 1970, MA 1972). New Hampshire's poet laureate. Winner of a PEN/Voelcker Award for Poetry
- Elizabeth Kostova, (MFA) Novel-in-Progress The Historian
- Arthur Miller (BA 1938) Pulitzer Prize for Drama winning playwright.
- Howard Moss, won the Pulitzer Prize for Poetry for Selected Poems in 1971.
- Davi Napoleon, (BA 1966, MA 1968; known then as Davi Skurnick), theater historian and critic, author of Chelsea on the Edge: The Adventures of an American Theater.
- Celeste Ng, (MFA) Novelist. Author of Little Fires Everywhere.
- Chigozie Obioma, (MFA) Nigerian writer. Finalist for 2015 Man Booker Prize and The Guardian First Book Award.
- Frank O'Hara, (M.A. 1951), poet. Leading figure of the New York School. Author of: "A City Winter and Other Poems", "Oranges: 12 pastorals", "Second Avenue", "Odes", "Lunch Poems. Love Poems".
- Patrick O'Keeffe, (MFA), winner of the Chamberlain Award for Creative Writing for "Above the Bar." (administered by the Hopwood Program) and instructor in the University of Michigan's Sweetland Writing Center has won the 2005 Story Prize, the richest U.S. prize for short fiction, for "The Hill Road", a collection of four novellas set in a fictional Irish farming village. O'Keeffe's writing has been compared to the Irish short-story and novel writer William Trevor.
- Marge Piercy, (BA) Poetry and Fiction (1957); author of seventeen volumes of poems
- Paisley Rekdal, (MFA) poet and essayist. Poet Laureate of Utah.
- Theodore Roethke, (B.A. 1930, M.A. 1932) regarded as one of the most accomplished and influential poets of his generation. Winner of a Pulitzer Prize for Poetry and two National Book Awards for Poetry.
- Betty Smith (B.A.) Author of A Tree Grows in Brooklyn
- Danez Smith (MFA) Poet. Finalist for 2017 National Book Award for Poetry.
- Keith Waldrop (Ph.D. 1964) poet and translator. Winner of a National Book Award for Poetry.
- Ronald Wallace
- Jesmyn Ward, (MFA 2005), novelist. Two-time winner of National Book Award for Fiction (2011, 2017).
- Nancy Willard (B.A. 1958; Ph.D.) author of eleven poetry books. Newbery Medal for "A Visit to William Blakes' Inn," finalist for National Book Award, O'Henry Award, Devins Poetry Award.

== See also ==
- University of Michigan
- Arthur Miller
