= Alex Liang Wong =

American musician and producer (born 1974)

Alex Wong
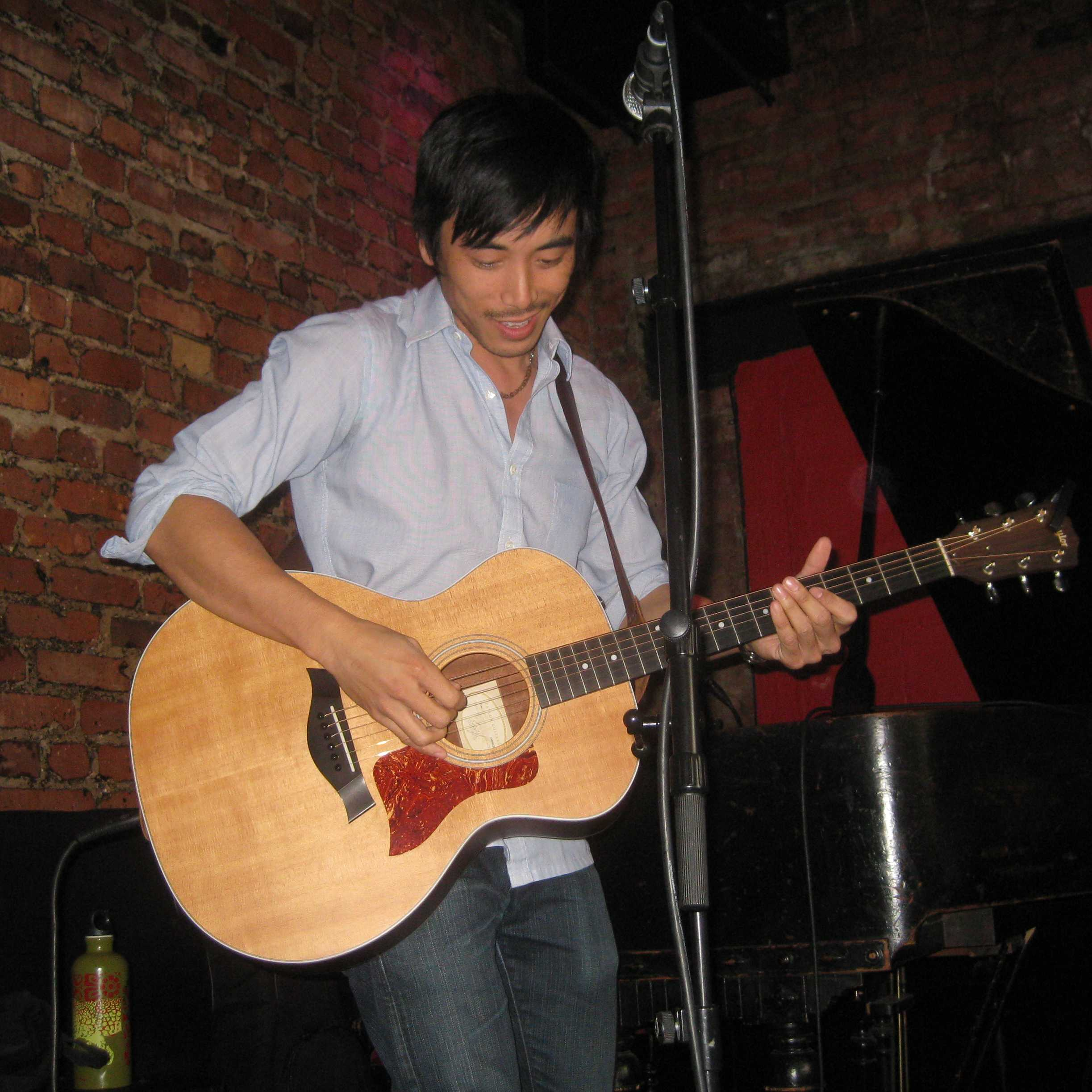
- Wong performing in 2011

Background information
- Born: Alex Liang Wong; 1974 (age 51–52); Palo Alto, California, US
- Genres: Pop; indie folk; chamber pop
- Occupations: Record producer; singer-songwriter; audio engineer
- Instruments: Vocals; piano; guitar; drums; waterphone
- Years active: 1997–present
- Labels: Beverly Martel Records, High Ceilings Music
- Formerly of: The Din Pedals; The Animators; Deadbeat Darling; The Paper Raincoat; Bellow
- Website: alexwongsounds.com

Alex Liang Wong (born 1974) is an American record producer, multi-instrumentalist (including guitar, piano, drums, and waterphone), and singer-songwriter based in Nashville, Tennessee.

Wong released his first solo studio album, A City on a Lake, in (2012). In 2020, he published his second solo album, The Elephant and the Seahorse. He has written, co-written, produced, and performed on numerous other albums by a variety of artists.

For his engineering contribution to "Aire soy", from Miguel Bosé's 2012 album, Papitwo, Wong received a Latin Grammy nomination.

== Career ==
Wong began his career in 1997 when he joined the Din Pedals. Chosen for his classically trained percussion skills, Wong replaced James Grundler on drums, with Grundler becoming the frontman of the group.

In 2002, Wong formed the Animators with Devon Copley. They released a number of albums and played on the NYC music scene for five years.

Wong went on to form the Paper Raincoat with Amber Rubarth. The band released an EP and a self-titled album, earning a fan following. Paste magazine labeled them "Best of What's Next" in 2010.

Wong has toured extensively with American singer-songwriter Vienna Teng. He co-produced her fourth album, Inland Territory, and co-wrote the song "Antebellum". The record won the ninth annual Independent Music Awards Vox Pop vote for best Folk/Singer-Songwriter Album. Wong also appeared on Teng's fifth album, Aims, singing a duet with her on "The Breaking Light", a song they co-wrote.

In 2011, Wong collaborated with Paul Freeman on a project called Bellows.

Wong has also toured extensively with Ximena Sariñana. She sings on the track "Oceanside" from Wong's debut solo album, A City on a Lake.

== Discography ==
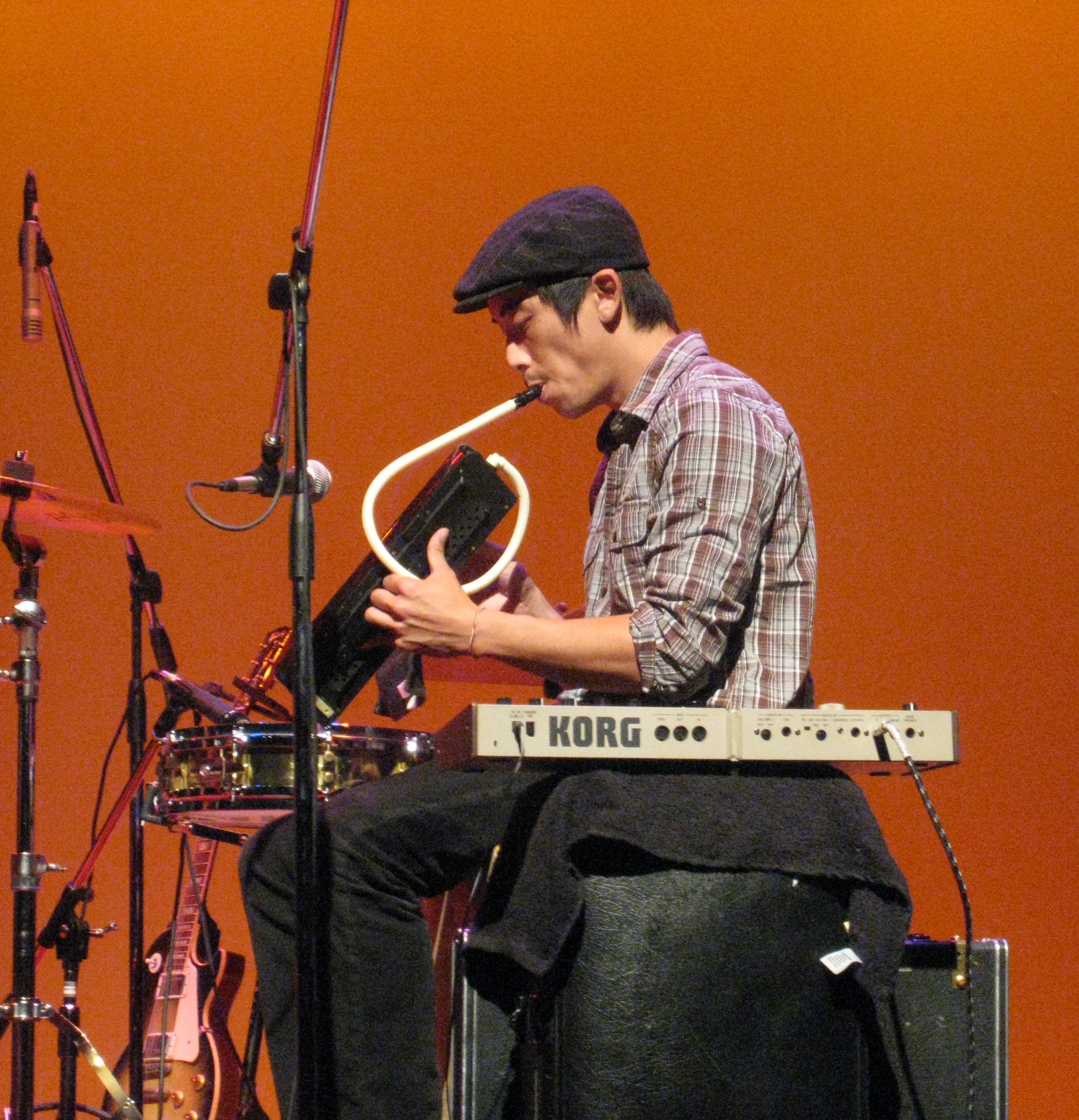
Wong playing the melodica at Attucks Theatre, Norfolk, VA, in 2010

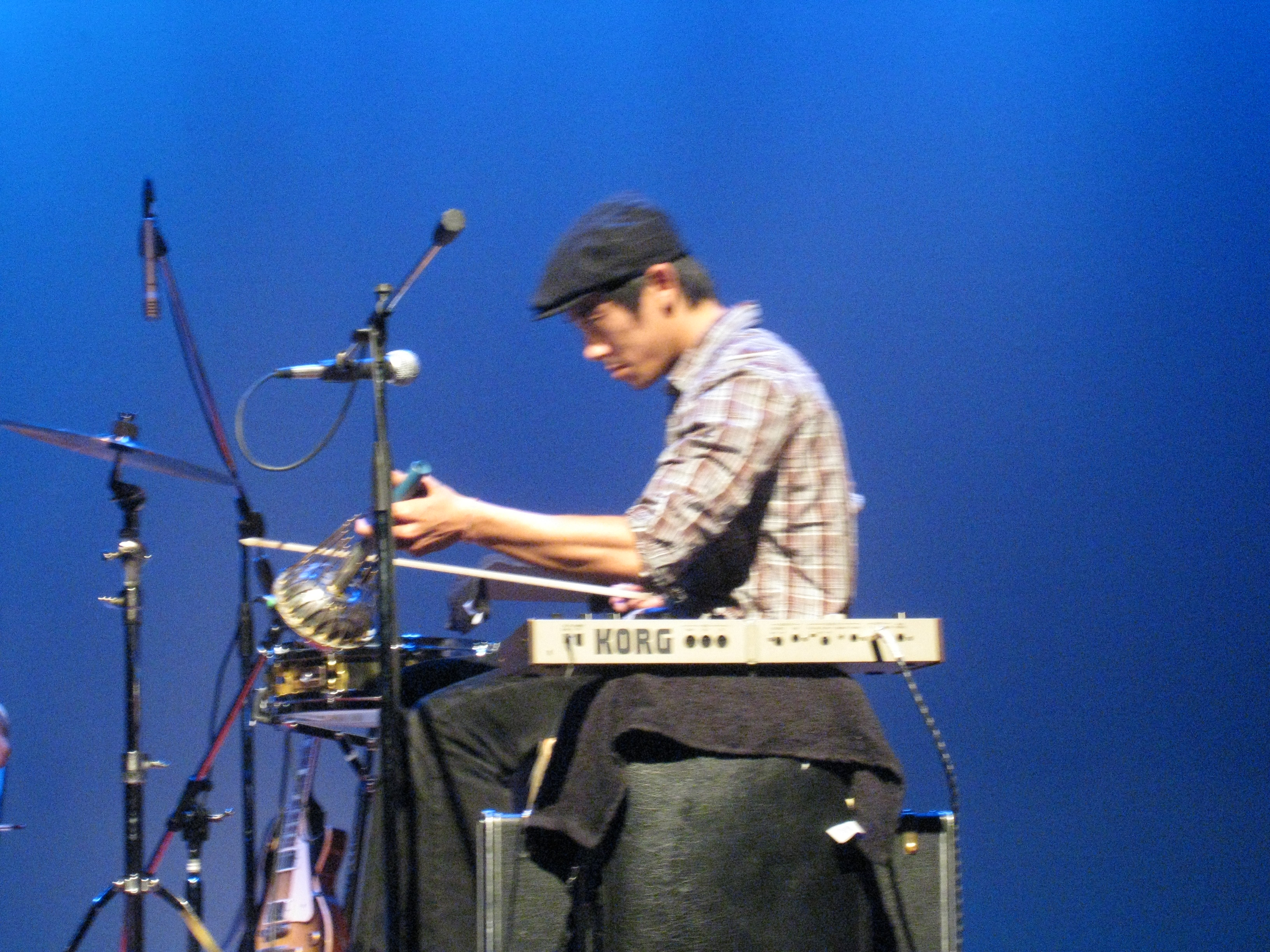
Wong playing a waterphone in 2010

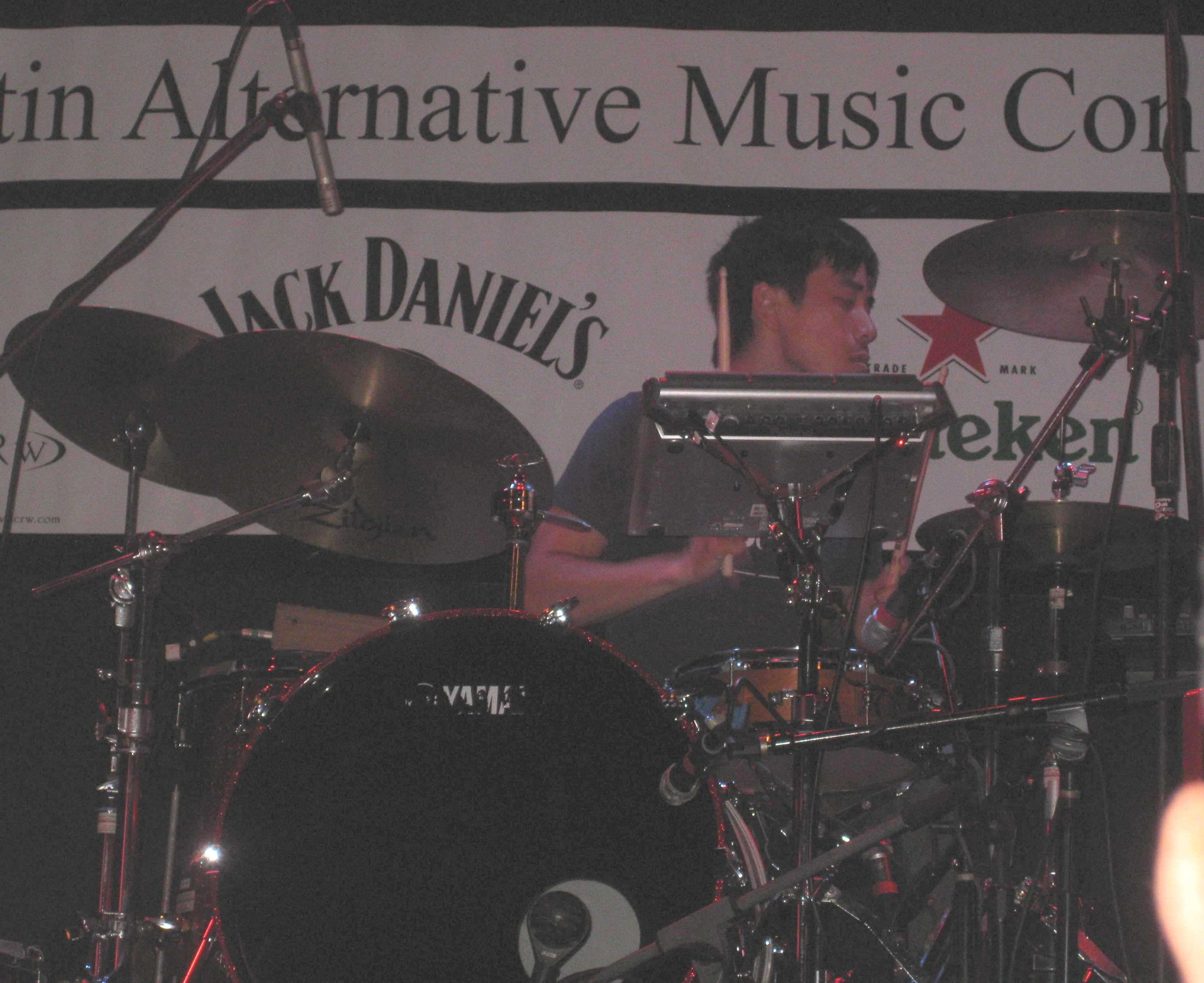
Wong drumming at Bowery Ballroom, NYC, in 2011

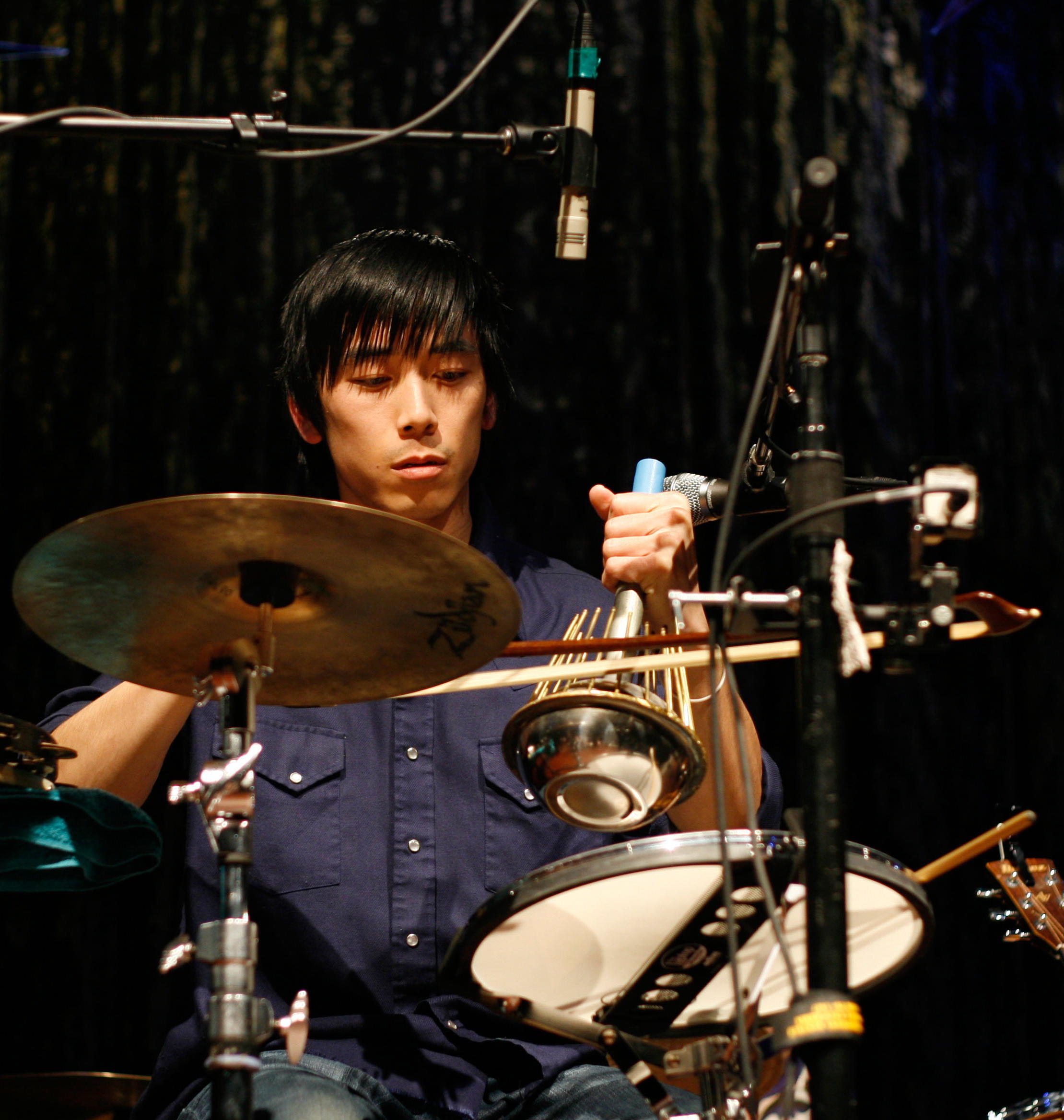
Wong playing a waterphone

Collaborators	Work
As a musician
Solo	Everyman for Himself (soundtrack – 2006); A City on a Lake (2012); The Elephant and the Seahorse (2020)
with the Din Pedals	The Din Pedals (1998)
with the Animators	Home by Now (2003); The Chamber Sessions (2004); How We Fight (2006)
with Deadbeat Darling	Belle Epoch (2007); Weight of Wandering (2009)
with the Paper Raincoat	Safe in the Sound (2008); The Paper Raincoat (2009)
with Vienna Teng	The Moment Always Vanishing (live album – 2010)
with Bellows	Relief (2013)
with Jesse Terry	Kivalina (2019)
As a producer
Amber Rubarth	Something New (2005); "Rough Cut" – Unfinished Art (2006); "Rough Cut", "In the Creases" – New Green Lines (2008)
Mariana Bell	Book (2008)
Vienna Teng	Inland Territory (2009)
Alex Berger	Snow Globe (2010)
Elizabeth & the Catapult	"Go Away My Lover" – The Other Side of Zero (2010)
Ari Hest	Sunset Over Hope Street (2011)
Melissa Ferrick	"Still Right Here", "Headphones On" – Still Right Here (2011)
Libbie Schrader	"Diamond Dust" – Magdalene (2011)
Delta Rae	Carry the Fire (2012); The Light (2020); The Dark (2021)
Martin Rivas	Reliquary (2012)
Ximena Sariñana	"I Want You" – Chimes of Freedom (2012)
Morgan Karr	Yellow Skies (2013)
Megan Slankard	Running on Machinery (2014)
Tyler Lyle	"Ditchdigger", "Hollywood Forever" – The Native Genius of Desert Plains (2015)
Sonia Rao	Meet Them at the Door (2016)
Sierra Noble	City of Ghosts (2016) – mixer
Swear and Shake	"Blouses", "How We Fight" – The Sound of Letting Go (2017)
Rebecca Promitzer	The Loveliness (2018)
Anne Heaton	"To the Light", "Hannah" – To the Light (2019)
Seth Glier	"A Gift", "Somebody Break My Heart" – The Coronation (2021)
