= After It All =

Studio album by Delta Rae
- Released: April 7, 2015
- Length: 43:08
- Label: Sire, Warner Bros.
- Producer: Peter Katis (additional production by Rob Cavallo and Julian Raymond)

Delta Rae chronology
Carry the Fire (2012)	After It All (2015)	The Light (2020)

After It All is the second full-length album by American folk rock band Delta Rae, released in 2015.

== Track listing ==
All tracks are written by Eric Hölljes and Ian Hölljes

No.	Title	Length
1.	"Anthem"	1:22
2.	"Run"	2:58
3.	"Outlaws"	3:34
4.	"The Dream"	0:30
5.	"Scared"	2:44
6.	"Chasing Twisters"	3:21
7.	"Bethlehem Steel"	3:12
8.	"Dead End Road"	2:53
9.	"You're the One for Me"	4:08
10.	"Cold Day in Heaven"	3:20
11.	"I Will Never Die"	3:38
12.	"The Meaning of It All"	3:38
13.	"My Whole Life Long"	3:59
14.	"After It All"	3:51

== Charts ==
Chart (2015)	Peak position
Hungarian Albums (MAHASZ)	31

== Critical reception ==
Professional ratings
Review scores
Source	Rating
AllMusic	2.5/5 stars
Sputnikmusic	3.0/5
PopMatters	7/10 stars

After it All Has received mixed to positive reviews from critics and fans. Critics often remarked on the album's heavy, orchestral instrumentation; Annie Galving of PopMatters described it as an "almost campy excess," ultimately giving the album seven stars out of a possible ten. Stephen Erlewine, writing for AllMusic, was more critical, writing of the instrumentals, "often, this onslaught feels like overkill because the songs aren't structured to support such heavy arrangements," and giving the album 2.5 stars out of a possible 5.

== Personnel ==
- Elizabeth Hopkins - vocals, percussion
- Brittany Hölljes - vocals, percussion
- Ian Hölljes - guitar (acoustic and electric), ukulele, vocals
- Eric Hölljes - keyboards, piano, Wurlitzer, guitar (acoustic and electric), accordion, percussion, vocals
- Mike McKee - drums, percussion, acoustic guitar, hammered dulcimer, tympani
- Grant Emerson - bass guitar (electric and upright), electric guitar, bowed cymbal
