= Warm Strangers =

Studio album by Vienna Teng
- Released: 24 February 2004
- Genre: Pop
- Label: Virt Records

Vienna Teng chronology
Waking Hour (2002)	Warm Strangers (2004)	Dreaming Through the Noise (2006)

Professional ratings
Review scores
Source	Rating
Allmusic	4/5 stars

Warm Strangers is singer-songwriter Vienna Teng's second album.

== Track listing ==
1. Feather Moon – 4:06
2. Harbor – 4:24
3. Hope on Fire – 4:26
4. Shine – 2:39
5. Mission Street – 4:32
6. My Medea – 4:09
7. Shasta (Carrie's Song) – 3:29
8. Homecoming (Walter's Song) – 5:48
9. Anna Rose – 3:07
10. Passage – 4:19
11. The Atheist Christmas Carol – 4:26
12. Green Island Serenade – 3:16
13. Boy at the Piano (Bonus Live Track for international release)
14. Hope on Fire (Bonus Live Track for international release)

== Notes ==
"Shasta" was inspired by the view of snow-covered volcano Mount Shasta from the Interstate 5 highway.

"Passage" is the only song to date that Vienna has recorded with no instrumental accompaniment, only vocals. It is sung from the point of view of a girl who died in a car crash. The CD liner provides no lyrics for "Passage."

"Green Island Serenade" is a separate, but hidden track found at the end of the album. It is a traditional song performed in Mandarin Chinese.

According to the album insert a portion of the proceeds from this album will go to Amnesty International and the Union of Concerned Scientists.
