= Jeff Campbell (musician) =

American musician and singer-songwriter

- Born: September 7, ?
- Origin: Philadelphia, Pennsylvania, United States
- Genres: Pop, Rock
- Years active: 2001–present
- Labels: Jeff Campbell Music,
- Website: www.jeffcampbellmusic.com

Jeff Campbell (born September 7, ? in Philadelphia, Pennsylvania) is an accomplished American musician and singer-songwriter.

== Early life ==
Campbell took private piano instruction as a child, started a metal band in high school, and attended school at West Chester University in Pennsylvania.

== Career ==
A Philadelphia native, Campbell moved to San Francisco in 2005 specifically for the newer Rock scene he had heard was developing. After a few years of trying to balance learning the West Coast Music Scene with his day job, the job was cast aside in favor of full-time touring, writing and recording.

In 2006, the musician started his second band "Pine and Battery," and indie-rock band, (2006–2012) with members Rick Munoz (drums), Andy Weller (guitar), and AJ Leighton (bass). Campbell's current band project includes San Francisco, Bay Area musicians Rick Munoz (drums), Max Delaney (guitar), Andrew Lion (bass). (2013–current.)

"On a whim, he decided to entered the Guitar Center Singer-Songwriter 2 contest and made it to the online semi-finals. From there, he was hand-picked as one of ten finalists who performed live...at Hollywood’s Hotel Cafe." – American Songwriter. Campbell was then selected as the winner of Guitar Center's National Singer Songwriter 2 Competition out of over 13,000 entrants in 2013, and released "In Spite of Everything", a 5-song EP produced by 6x Grammy Winning Producer John Shanks, later that year. The EP debuted at No. 1 on the iTunes Rock EPs and Singles Charts.

== Discography ==
=== Studio albums ===
- "Commutation" (2002 Kettle)
- "Pine and Battery"(2007 Pine and Battery)
- "Pine and Battery 2" (2009 Pine and Battery)
- "Stop & Go" (2012)
- "The Kitchen Sink" (2015)

=== EPs and singles ===
- "Daylights" Pine and Battery (2012 EP)
- "In Spite of Everything" (2005 EP)

=== DVDs and live albums ===
- "Stop & Go, Live at Coast" (2012 live album)
- "Stop & Go, Live at Coast" (2012 live DVD)

=== Appearances on other albums and singles ===
- Running on Machinery, "If I Knew", Megan Slankard (2015)
