= Waking Hour (album) =

Studio album by Vienna Teng
- Released: November 5, 2002
- Genre: Indie folk, pop, chamber pop
- Label: Virt

Vienna Teng chronology
Waking Hour (2002)	Warm Strangers (2004)

Professional ratings
Review scores
Source	Rating
Allmusic	4/5 stars

Waking Hour is Vienna Teng's first album. Originally released independently in 2001, the album was re-released in 2002 with minor modifications after Teng signed with small label Virt Records.

The album was released in the United Kingdom by Rounder Europe in 2006 under license from Virt Records.

== Track listing ==
1. "The Tower" — 3:51
2. "Momentum" — 5:23
3. "Gravity" — 3:40
4. "Daughter" — 3:16
5. "Between" — 3:35
6. "Say Uncle" — 5:27
7. "Drought" — 4:06
8. "Enough to Go By" — 4:20
9. "Unwritten Letter #1" — 3:37
10. "Eric's Song" — 5:08
11. "Soon Love Soon" — 4:38
12. "Lullaby for a Stormy Night" — 3:53
13. "Decade and One" — 4:59

(Note: This is the track listing for the re-released version on Virt Records. The original, independent release had a slightly different track order and less polished versions of a few songs.)
