= Carry the Fire (Delta Rae album) =

Studio album by Delta Rae
- Released: June 19, 2012
- Length: 48:42
- Label: Sire, Warner Bros.
- Producer: Alex Wong

Delta Rae chronology
Live at Lincoln Theatre (2012)	Carry the Fire (2012)	After It All (2015)

Carry the Fire is the debut studio album by American folk rock band Delta Rae. It was released in 2012 on Sire Records.

== Critical reception ==
PopMatters wrote that "Delta Rae needs better material to show off what makes them special and distinctive." Indy Week called the album "an embarrassment of expectations and enthusiasms, where musical and lyrical platitudes dovetail for 48 overwrought and unrelenting minutes."

== Track listing ==
All tracks are written by Eric Hölljes and Ian Hölljes.

Carry the Fire
No.	Title	Length
1.	"Holding on to Good"	4:44
2.	"Is There Anyone Out There"	4:50
3.	"Morning Comes"	3:58
4.	"If I Loved You"	3:39
5.	"Bottom of the River"	3:22
6.	"Country House"	4:23
7.	"Surrounded"	4:49
8.	"Dance in the Graveyards"	3:27
9.	"Fire"	3:40
10.	"Forgive the Children We Once Were"	4:40
11.	"Unlike Any Other"	3:08
12.	"Hey, Hey, Hey"	4:02

iTunes bonus tracks
No.	Title	Length
13.	"New Days (Acoustic)"	2:50
14.	"Morning Comes (Acoustic)"	4:19

== Personnel ==
- Elizabeth Hopkins – lead vocals
- Brittany Hölljes – lead vocals
- Ian Hölljes – guitar, vocals
- Eric Hölljes – keyboards, piano, guitar, vocals
- Mike McKee – drums, percussion
- Grant Emerson – bass guitar
