= Ellery (duo) =

American alternative musical group

- Genres: Alternative folk Alternative pop/rock Indie
- Labels: Virt Records
- Members: Tasha Golden; Justin Golden
- Website: http://www.ellerymusic.com/

Ellery is a musical group formed in Cincinnati (now based in Louisville), founded by married couple Tasha and Justin Golden. They began work as Ellery in 2005. Their style has been called "ethereal lush-pop", often compared to that of Feist, Sarah McLachlan, Regina Spektor, Hem, and Patty Griffin.

== History ==
The couple began touring full-time in 2003, and recorded their first EP - Make Your Troubles Mine - in 2005, with the help of producer and guitarist Ric Hordinski (formerly of Over the Rhine). The debut was received with positive reviews in local newspapers, and their local public radio station, WNKU, put them in regular rotation. After a feature in Performing Songwriter Magazine, Virt Records signed the band and sent them back into the studio to turn their EP into a full-length album. The result, Lying Awake, was released in 2006.

From 2006-2010, Ellery toured with and opened for luminaries Hem, Vienna Teng, Over the Rhine, Teddy Thompson, Dar Williams, Lucy Kaplansky, etc. They have performed all over U.S., as well as in China and Belgium.

In 2007 Ellery recorded and released a live DVD, "An Evening with Ellery," which aired across the U.S. multiple times on PBS and cable networks.

In 2008, Ellery released the EP You Did Everything Right. The title track addressed family histories of domestic violence, which songwriter Tasha Golden discussed openly during shows and interviews. In 2010, the Mayor of Covington, KY awarded Ellery a Key to the City for their efforts to raise awareness regarding domestic violence.

In 2009, Ellery recorded their second full-length album, funded by their "Ellery Stimulus" (the band's precursor to Kickstarter), with Grammy-winning producer Malcolm Burn.

Late that year, Tasha Golden experienced severe depression that ultimately led the couple off the road, and delayed the release of their record. When "This Isn't Over Yet" came out in June 2010, it was featured in Sing Out!, M Music, Paste Magazine, etc, and invited conversations in interviews about mental health, creativity, and stigma.

No longer touring full time, Tasha began a Master's program in Creative Writing at Miami University in 2010, and Justin began working on the team that made tour visuals for artists such as Katy Perry, Taylor Swift, Blake Shelton Kanye West, Usher, etc - eventually including work for the 2015 Super Bowl Half Time show. Tasha's debut book, Once You Had Hands (2015, Humanist Press) combines her poetry with photographs by renowned natural light photographer Michael Wilson; it was a finalist for the 2016 Ohioana Book Award in Poetry.

The duo continued to write, record, and license music to TV/film, performing primarily in the midwest. In 2012, Tasha began facilitating creative writing workshops for incarcerated teen women, eventually founding Project Uncaged: a trauma-informed creative writing program designed for justice-involved girls. This program, combined with Ellery's history of examining difficult experiences through song, led Tasha's to pursue a PhD in Public Health Sciences, studying effects of arts on health, well-being, research, health equity, and communication. Golden has published several peer-reviewed articles and speaks internationally about arts in public health.

Justin has regularly produced, mixed, and engineered records since 2010; he's also done sound-for-picture editing and design, and edits audio for prominent podcasts. His credits include EMP Museum, Over the Rhine, Funny or Die, McLaren, Adult Swim, Roku, Kim Taylor, a16z, etc. Justin also arranged, engineered, produced, and mixed all tracks on Ellery's 2017 release "Over Land, Over Sea."

Ellery's songs have been heard in movies and TV dramas, including No Strings Attached, One Tree Hill, Charmed, Zero Hour, The Lying Game, etc.

== Style and sound ==
Ellery's unique sound has a lot to do with Tasha Golden's vocals. Their songs also have memorable lines with melodic hooks, incorporating instruments such as piano, wurlitzer, rhodes, pedal steel, electric, acoustic, and tenor guitars, pump organ, a variety of synths, etc.

== Discography ==
- The Ordinary 2003 (As Dividing the Plunder)
- Make Your Troubles Mine EP, 2005
- Lying Awake released by Virt Records, 2006. (All eleven songs on this album were written by Tasha and Justin)
- "Anna" from Lying Awake was featured on Paste Magazine Sampler CD No. 21
- What I've Said Out Loud (live album), 2007
- December Days EP, released via www.ellerychristmas.com as a free download, 2007
- You Did Everything Right EP, 2008
- Down, Down, Down: A Holiday EP, 2009
- This Isn't Over Yet, 2010
- L'Histoire de Nos Chats (single), 2013
- Over Land, Over Sea EP, 2017
