= The Din Pedals (album) =

Studio album by The Din Pedals
- Released: February 10, 1998
- Recorded: February 1997 – June 1997
- Genre: Alternative rock
- Length: 47:53
- Label: Epic Records
- Producer: Stephen Short

The Din Pedals chronology
Plastic and Chrome (1996)	The Din Pedals (1998)

Singles from The Din Pedals
- 1. "Ashtray" Released: 1998

The Din Pedals is the major label debut album by American alternative rock band The Din Pedals. Shortly after it was released by Epic Records in February 1998, the band broke up.

== Background ==
Tracks 1, 3, 4, 9 and 10 were re-recorded from prior independent albums the band had released between 1995 and 1996, while the rest of the album consisted of new songs they wrote after getting signed to Epic Records in 1997.

== Appearances in other media ==
In October 1997, the song "Waterfall" appeared on the soundtrack album for the slasher film I Know What You Did Last Summer, as well as briefly appearing within the film itself. The film and its soundtrack album were released by Columbia Pictures and Columbia Records, which were all Sony-owned companies along with the band's label Epic Records. "Waterfall" was also featured on a 1999 episode of the show Dawson's Creek, which was produced by Sony's Columbia TriStar Television.

== Reception ==
Professional ratings
Review scores
Source	Rating
AllMusic	3/5 stars

In March 1998, the Daily Bruin gave the album a positive review. They wrote, "The Din Pedals create charged, well-crafted melodies that easily compare to such vital alternative bands as Radiohead and Live", adding that "most of this comes from the evident talents of guitarist Harrison’s skilled riffwork and lead singer James Grundler's soaring vocals, which sound a lot like those of Radiohead's Thom Yorke and Brit-band Marion's Jamie Harding. Their combined talents on every track make for some of the most moving and engaging music in rock today."

Tom Demalon of AllMusic gave the album a three-star rating. He compared the album's vocals to Bono of U2. He also made comparisons to Radiohead, specifically on the closing track "Plastic", noting that "the line referring to 'blow through the ceiling' in the same song echoes a similar line in Radiohead's "Fake Plastic Trees."" However, he concludes his review by stating that "The music is dynamic [...] and the Din Pedals are a band worth watching. They have a solid blueprint and it will be interesting to see if they can create something a bit more their own."

== Track listing ==
No.	Title	Length
1.	"Kangaroo Kourt"	3:31
2.	"Downtown Sister"	3:13
3.	"Ashtray"	4:39
4.	"Emotional Drugs"	5:51
5.	"Not Much for Saturdays"	4:38
6.	"Pornstar"	3:58
7.	"Aliens"	3:51
8.	"Hands for Rosie's Show"	4:01
9.	"Naked Is Foreign"	5:54
10.	"Waterfall"	3:47
11.	"Plastic"	4:30
Total length:		47:53
