= Lady Is a Pirate =

Lady is a Pirate

Studio album by Megan Slankard
- Released: July 18, 2001
- Genre: Pop rock Pop
- Label: Megan Slankard Music (Independent)
- Producer: Megan Slankard; Tom W. Slankard

Megan Slankard chronology
Lady is a Pirate (2001)	Freaky Little Story (2004)

Lady is a Pirate is the début album by American independent singer Megan Slankard, released on July 18, 2001. Most of the tracks were recorded and produced by Megan while at her parents' house in Tracy, California with her brother, Tom. Additional recording was done with the help of Rich Talley, (who provides the bass track for many of the album tracks.) Additional album production work was done with the help of Megan's brother .

== Track listing ==
- All songs written by Megan Slankard unless noted otherwise.
1. "Landed" – 3:47
2. "Practice Electra" – 3:07
3. "Strictly Mr. T" – 4:08
4. "Damn You" – 4:15
5. "Fly Now" – 4:30
6. "Second Best" – 3:52
7. "Haven't Been Down" – 4:30
8. "Radio Blues" – 5:46
9. "Me Again" – 4:16
10. "The Feud" – 4:41
11. "Company" – 3:41
12. "I Hoped You Would" – 3:16
13. "Lady Is A Pirate" – 3:22

== Personnel ==
- Megan Slankard - Steel-string guitar, musical arranger, vocals
- Rich Talley, Bass guitar
- Tom W. Slankard, co-producer
