= The Din Pedals =

- Origin: San Luis Obispo, California, USA
- Genre: Alternative rock
- Years active: 1991-1998
- Labels: BullDawg Gramophone Ltd., Epic Records

The Din Pedals were an American alternative rock band that formed in 1991 in San Luis Obispo, California. They were signed to Epic Records from 1997 to 1998, and released one self-titled album through the label, before breaking up shortly after.

== History ==
=== Early years (1991–1996) ===
Formed in 1991 in the Central Californian city of San Luis Obispo, The Din Pedals were initially a power trio in search of a lead vocalist and a drummer. After settling on James Grundler to perform both duties, they released two independent records during the mid-1990s. These releases were successes locally. In 1996, classically trained drummer Alex Wong replaced Grundler on percussion.

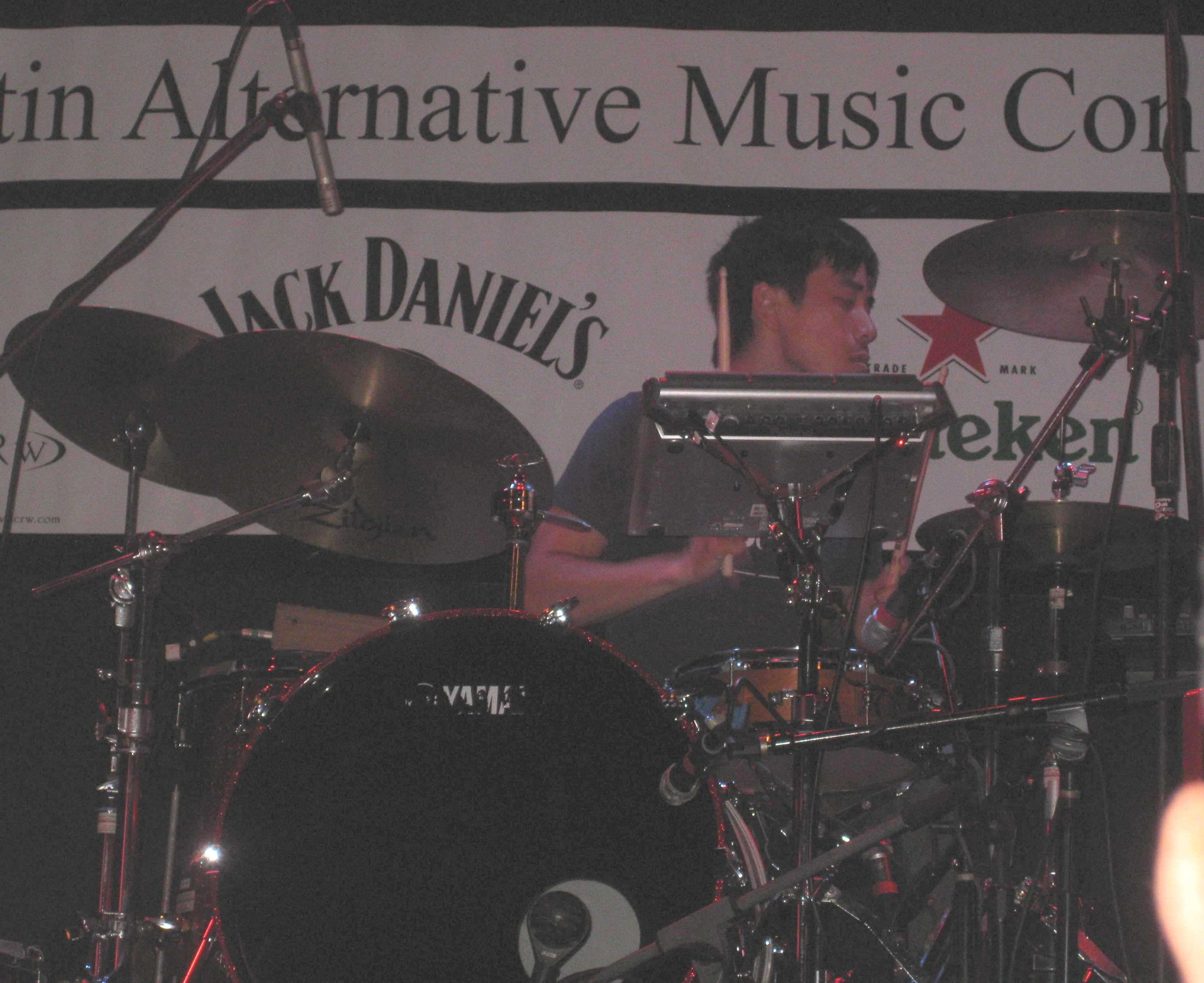
Drummer Alex Wong.

=== Major label years and break up (1997–1998) ===
By the beginning of 1997, the band garnered enough buzz to sign with the major label Epic Records. They immediately began recording their self-titled major label debut in Los Angeles, with it being completed in June 1997. It was helmed by British producer Stephen Short. While the record was being prepared for release, the song "Waterfall" appeared in the popular 1997 slasher film I Know What You Did Last Summer. It was also included on the film's soundtrack album, released on October 7, 1997 by Columbia Records. On February 10, 1998, their self-titled album was finally released. It failed to attract mainstream attention, and vocalist James Grundler subsequently quit the band, with plans of launching a solo career. He would eventually instead form another Californian alternative rock band called Paloalto, who released two albums through Rick Rubin's American Recordings in the early 2000s.

== Musical style ==
The Din Pedals sound has been heavily compared to the British band Radiohead. AllMusic critic Tom Demalon remarked "They are one of the first, and best, examples of the influence of Radiohead on late-'90s alternative rock." The band's guitarist, simply known as "Harrison", described their sound in a 1996 interview with Billboard as "U2 times Radiohead."

== Members ==
- James Grundler - Vocals (1991 - 1998), Drums (1991 - 1996)
- Harrison - Guitar (1991 - 1998)
- Ben DeJong - Bass (1991 - 1998)
- Alex Wong - Drums (1996 - 1998)

== Discography ==
- Candide (1995) [Recorded in 1994]
- Plastic and Chrome (1996) [Recorded in 1995]
- The Din Pedals (1998) [Recorded in 1997]
