= A Little Extra Sun =

EP by Megan Slankard
- Released: September 6, 2005
- Genre: Pop/Rock
- Label: Joe's Music (Independent)
- Producer: Megan Slankard, Adam Rossi

Megan Slankard chronology
Freaky Little Story (2004)	A Little Extra Sun (2005)	A Token of the Wreckage (2011)

Professional ratings
Review scores
Source	Rating
Allmusic	4/5 stars

A Little Extra Sun is the third studio recording and first EP by American independent singer Megan Slankard, released on September 6, 2005, as the follow-up to her second album, Freaky Little Story. This was first released as a limited edition EP exclusively available at CD Baby, with limited distribution available at other music retailers in 2006.

== Track listing ==
1. "My Hallelujah" (Slankard) – 3:47
2. "Sails" (Slankard) – 3:30
3. "Planets" (Slankard) – 4:16
4. "You Love Like" (Slankard) – 3:58
5. "Riley" (Slankard) – 2:58

== Personnel ==
- Megan Slankard – acoustic guitar, electric guitar, vocals
- Adam Rossi – keyboards, programming
- Dan Vickrey – electric guitar, acoustic guitar
- Nelson Braxton – bass
- Steve Bowman – drums
- Brian Collier – drums
