= Dreaming Through the Noise =

Studio album by Vienna Teng
- Released: July 25, 2006
- Genre: Pop
- Label: Zoë/Rounder
- Producer: Larry Klein

Vienna Teng chronology
Warm Strangers (2004)	Dreaming Through the Noise (2006)	Inland Territory (2009)

Professional ratings
Review scores
Source	Rating
AllMusic	3.5/5 stars

Dreaming Through the Noise is singer-songwriter Vienna Teng's third album.

== Track listing ==
All songs written by Vienna Teng.

1. "Blue Caravan" - 3:56
2. "Whatever You Want" - 4:00
3. "Love Turns 40" - 5:12
4. "I Don't Feel So Well" - 4:16
5. "City Hall" - 4:48
6. "Nothing Without You" - 3:39
7. "Transcontinental, 1:30 A.M." - 3:46
8. "1BR/1BA" - 4:02
9. "Now Three" - 3:04
10. "Pontchartrain" - 6:15
11. "Recessional" - 4:05

== Band ==
Jay Bellerose	drums, percussion
Debra Fong	violin
Marika Hughes	cello
Carla Kihlstedt	violin
Dina Maccabee	viola
Frank Marocco	accordion
Dean Parks	guitars, mandolin, pedal steel
David Piltch	bass
Vienna Teng	vocals, piano, organ, wurlitzer
Lee Thornburg	flugelhorn, trumpet

Till Bronner	trumpet on Transcontinental, 1:30 a.m
Kyler England	backing vocals on City Hall
Marika Hughes	solo cello on Blue Caravan and 1br/1ba
Carla Kihlstedt	solo violin on Pontchartrain
Larry Klein	bass on Whatever You Want
Dina Maccabee	solo viola on Blue Caravan, I Don't Feel So Well, City Hall; backing vocals on City Hall
Dean Parks	e-bow on Blue Caravan
David Piltch	bass on Love Turns 40

Strings arranged by Mark Orton. Engineered and mixed by Helik Hadar.
