= Inland Territory =

Studio album by Vienna Teng
- Released: April 7, 2009
- Genres: Pop folk, acoustic rock
- Label: Zoë/Rounder Records
- Producers: Alex Wong and Vienna Teng

Vienna Teng chronology
Dreaming Through the Noise (2006)	Inland Territory (2009)	The Moment Always Vanishing (2010)

Professional ratings
Review scores
Source	Rating
AsiaXpress.com	2009
The Second Supper	link
Slant Magazine	2009
Stereo Subversion	link

Inland Territory is the fourth studio album by singer-songwriter Vienna Teng. It was released in Germany on February 6, 2009, and in the U.S. on April 7, 2009. The record was recorded over five months in four cities.

== Track listing ==
All songs written by Vienna Teng (except "Antebellum", written by Vienna Teng and Alex Wong).

1. "The Last Snowfall" – 3:24
2. "White Light" – 4:12
3. "Antebellum" – 4:43
4. "Kansas" – 4:31
5. "In Another Life" – 3:32
6. "Grandmother Song" – 3:32
7. "Stray Italian Greyhound" – 4:06
8. "Augustine" – 3:13
9. "No Gringo" – 5:23
10. "Watershed" – 4:37
11. "Radio" – 4:13
12. "St. Stephen's Cross" – 5:07
13. "Antebellum (acoustic version)" [included in bonus track version] – 4:41
14. "White Light (acoustic version)" [Amazon.com exclusive for pre-order customers] – 3:07
