= Green Island Serenade =

"Green Island Serenade" (Chinese: 綠島小夜曲; pinyin: Lǜdǎo Xiǎoyèqǔ; also known as "Serenade of Green Island") is a Mandarin Chinese classic song composed in 1954 by Chow Lan-ping (Chinese: 周藍萍; pinyin: Zhōu Lánpíng). It was composed for the soundtrack for a film. It was later performed by Zi Wei (紫薇) and became a hit song among Chinese communities in Southeast Asia. The lyrics of this song were probably written by either Pan Ying-chieh (Chinese: 潘英傑; pinyin: Pān Yīngjié) or Gao Yudang.

== Background and meaning ==
The song has been caught in a decades-long dispute over authorship and intent. This song has often been associated with a political meaning, for the real Green Island was used as a place of exile for political prisoners from the late 1940s during the single party rule of Taiwan's Kuomintang (Chinese Nationalist Party). It was claimed that a prisoner there named Gao Yudang wrote the song with Wang Bo-wen while they were prisoners there. Pan Ying-chieh, a professional musician, also claimed to have written the lyrics with Chow Lan-ping composing the music for a movie soundtrack. He claimed that the Green Island in the title means Taiwan itself, and that the original intent of the song was a description of unrequited romantic love. Pan's daughter later claimed that he wrote the lyrics originally as an expression of love for one of his students whom he later married.

== Recordings ==
"Green Island Serenade" - Zi Wei
A short clip of an early recording of "Green Island Serenade" by Zi Wei (紫薇).

The song was written in 1954 and a recording of the song was made in the late 1950s by Zi Wei. It was performed as a slow romantic ballad accompanied by orchestral strings, a style that was popular in that period. The song first became popular in the Philippines, spreading to other Chinese communities in Southeast Asia, then became popular in Taiwan itself in the early 1960s. The song is notable as one of the earliest songs from a Taiwan-based singer to achieve widespread popularity among other overseas Chinese communities.

The song has since been covered by many singers. A cover version of this song appears as a hidden track on Vienna Teng's second album, Warm Strangers (2004). The song was adapted into multiple Cantonese versions, including a notable rendition "The Light of Friendship" (友誼之光), sung by Maria Cordero, for the 1987 film Prison on Fire. Although many people believed that Teresa Teng had made this song famous, there is no evidence that Teresa Teng had sung this song.
