= Freaky Little Story =

Studio album by Megan Slankard
- Released: June 22, 2004
- Genre: Pop/rock
- Label: Megan Slankard Music (Independent)
- Producer: Megan Slankard, Chris Holmes

Megan Slankard chronology
Lady is a Pirate (2001)	Freaky Little Story (2004)	A Little Extra Sun (2005)

Freaky Little Story is the second album by American independent singer Megan Slankard, released on June 22, 2004.

== What Not to Wear ==
When Slankard appeared in an episode of the TLC show What Not to Wear in late 2004, her songs "Too Bad You" and "Mockingbird" were featured on that episode. Following the broadcast, sales of her album skyrocketed, eventually peaking at #5 on the Amazon.com chart and topping the CD Baby album chart.

== Track listing ==
1. "Too Bad You" (Slankard) – 3:24
2. "Mocking Bird" (Slankard) – 3:04
3. "Dirty Wings" (Slankard) – 3:34
4. "Captain Madness" (Slankard) – 4:00
5. "Addy's Tattoo" (Slankard) – 3:40
6. "Lose Me" (Slankard) – 3:47
7. "Give Life" (Slankard) – 4:42
8. "Forget" (Slankard) – 4:35
9. "Nearly Almost Always Nearly Almost Anything" (Slankard) – 4:59
10. "Holding Off" (Slankard) – 3:45
11. "It's All My Fault (But I'm Not Sorry)" (Slankard) – 3:57
12. "Flying Backwards" (Slankard) – 5:21
13. "The Freak Out Song" (Slankard) – 6:19

== Personnel ==
- Megan Slankard - acoustic guitar, arranger, vocals
- Anthony Cole - scratching, sampling
- Mike Hsieh - electric guitar, additional acoustic guitar in "Nearly Almost Always Nearly Almost Anything"
- Dave Moffat - bass
- Ian Stambaugh - drums
- Sam Leachman - cello in "Addy's Tattoo"
- Chris Holmes - electric guitar and shaker in "Give Life"
