= The Bittersweets =

Alternative country duo (founded 2005)

- Origin: San Francisco, California; United States
- Genres: Alternative country, folk, pop, rock
- Years active: 2005– present
- Labels: Virt Records, Compass Records, Poor Valley Recording Co.
- Members: Hannah Prater; Chris Meyers
- Website: thebittersweets.com

The Bittersweets are an alternative country duo from Nashville, Tennessee, founded by singer-songwriter Chris Meyers (guitar, keyboards, vocals) and Hannah Prater (vocals, guitar) in 2005. They frequently tour venues and festivals in the Southern United States.

== History ==
Meyers and Prater met in San Francisco, California after Meyers had moved there after attending Kenyon College in Ohio. Before they met, Hannah Prater had toured as a jazz vocalist in Europe. Prater, a California native, is the child of two music teachers. Meyers, born in Massachusetts, began playing guitar in his teens and toured locally while still in college.

Before releasing their first full-length album, The Bittersweets opened for Train at the Fillmore West in San Francisco. According to their official biography, "The manager of a teenaged [sic] musician Meyers was tutoring got the Bittersweets’ demo into the hands of taste-making San Francisco station KFOG" which helped broaden their success. After their third public appearance they signed with Virt Records. After moving to Nashville the band signed with Compass Records.

== Discography ==
=== Studio albums ===
==== The Life You Always Wanted ====
- Released June 27, 2006, on the Virt Records label
- Additional musicians drums: Steve Bowman (Counting Crows, Third Eye Blind); bass: Daniel Schacht (Jolie Holland); piano and guitar: Jerry Becker
- All songs written by Meyers
- Produced by Meyers, Schacht and Becker
- Tracks
  1. When the World Ends
  2. Adam
  3. Bag of Bones
  4. Long Day
  5. Houston
  6. Mostly Happy People
  7. Burn out My Eyes
  8. Shooting out the Sky
  9. Rapture
  10. Prison
  11. And Death Shall Have No Dominion

==== Goodnight, San Francisco ====
- Released September 9, 2008, on the Compass Records label
- Produced by Lex Price (Mindy Smith)
- Additional Musicians steel guitar: Russ Pahl (Don Williams); bass: Dave Jacques (John Prine); drums: Steve Bowman (Counting Crows); guitar: Doug Lancio (Patty Griffin); cello: David Henry (Ben Folds); organ: John Deaderick (Emmylou Harris)
- Mixed by Jason Lehning (Guster)
- Tracks
  1. Wreck 4:20
  2. Blue 3:55
  3. Is Anyone Safe 4:48
  4. Birmingham 3:49
  5. 45 3:59
  6. My Sweet Love 3:39
  7. Bordertown 4:19
  8. Tidal Waves 4:30
  9. Lies 4:30
  10. Goodnight, San Francisco 3:52
  11. When the War is Over 4:21
  12. Fortunate Wind 3:24

=== Extended play release ===
==== EP ====
- Released January 1, 2005, on the Poor Valley Recording Co. label
- Tracks
  1. Long Day 4:06
  2. Mostly Happy People 3:39
  3. Shooting Out the Sky 4:39
  4. Bag of Bones 4:41
  5. Houston 5:12

=== Live albums ===
==== Long Way From Home ====
- Released in 2009 on the Compass Records label
- Tracks
  1. Mostly Happy People 3:36
  2. Adam 4:30
  3. When the World Ends 3:53
  4. Houston
  5. Shooting Out the Sky 4:30
  6. Bring Me Little Water, Sylvie 2:24 (Lead Belly)
  7. Rapture 3:48
  8. Bag of Bones 5:07
  9. Unchained Melody 5:05 (Alex North and Hy Zaret)
  10. Long Day 3:52
  11. Prison 3:51

==== Live in Atlanta 2.4.09 ====
- Released February 10, 2009, on NoiseTrade.com
- Tracks
  1. Wreck 4:41
  2. Blue 4:17
  3. Fortunate Wind 2:34
  4. Prison 3:49
  5. Birmingham 4:07
  6. Goodnight, San Francisco 4:19
  7. Is Anyone Safe 4:09
  8. My Sweet Love 4:10
  9. Long Day 3:57

== Other notes ==
- "Long Day" from The Life You Always Wanted appears on the KFOG Local Scene: Volume 3 compilation.
- The band has opened for Train, Rosanne Cash, and the Cowboy Junkies.
- The band's music has been used in prime-time series "Men In Trees" and "Saving Grace".
- The Life You Always Wanted was listed amongst the top 200 sellers in the San Francisco Bay Area during the first week of its release.
