= Megan Slankard =

American musician and singer-songwriter (born 1983)

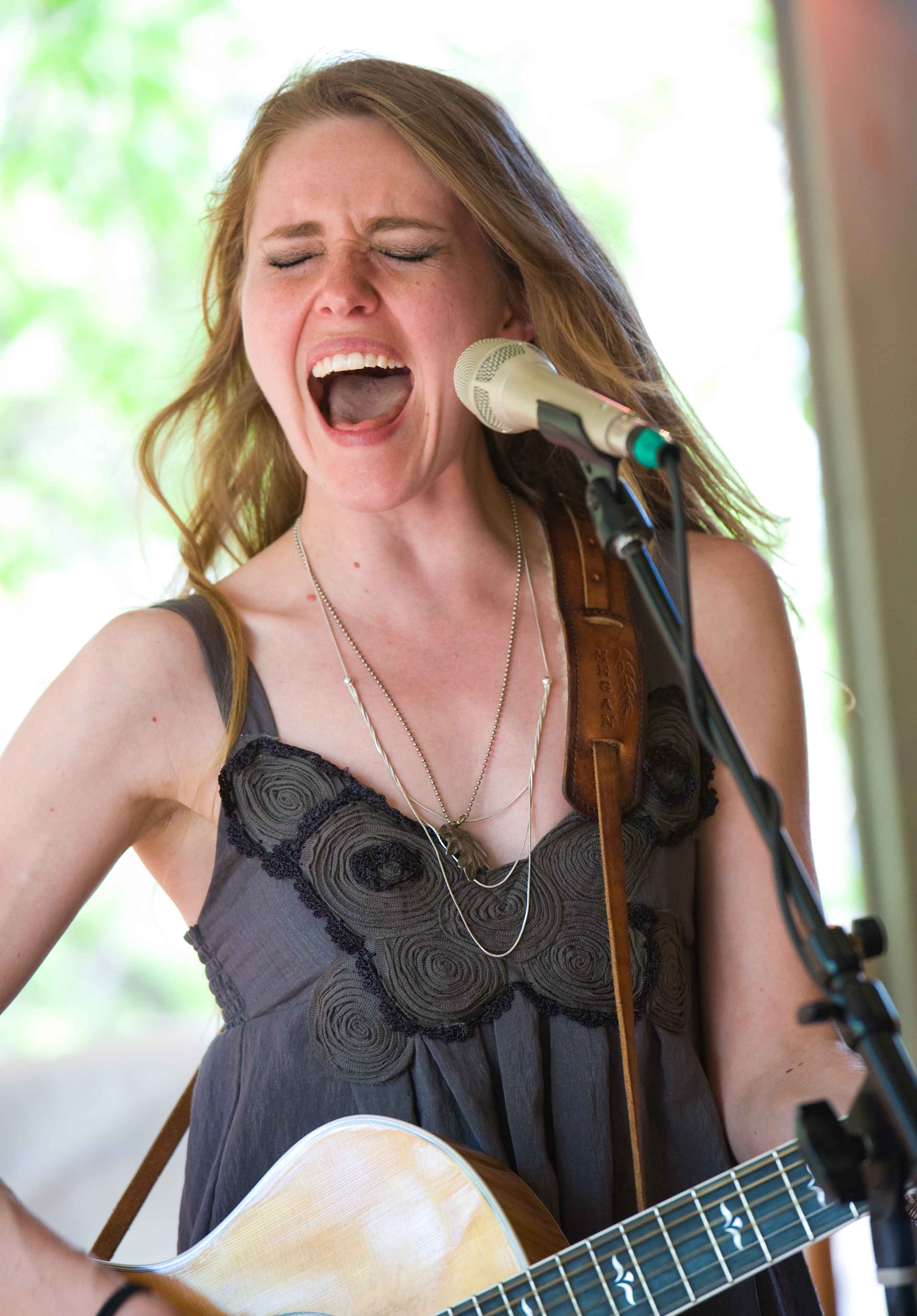
- Slankard performing at the 2011 SXSW Music Festival.

Background information
- Born: June 6, 1983 (age 43)
- Origin: Tracy, California, U.S.
- Genres: Pop, rock
- Occupations: singer, songwriter
- Instruments: Vocals, acoustic guitar, electric guitar, mandolin
- Years active: 2001–present
- Labels: Megan Slankard Music (2001—present), KC Turner Music (2008—present)
- Website: Megan Slankard Official Website

Megan Slankard (born June 6, 1983) is an American musician and singer-songwriter.

== Early life ==
Megan Slankard was born on June 6, 1983 in Tracy, California. Slankard began learning the guitar when she was 10 years old. At age 17, Slankard produced and recorded her first album, Lady is a Pirate, with her brother at home on her computer.

== Career ==
After turning 18, Slankard toured with David Knopfler as the opening act for his European tour and co-wrote the title song of his album Ship of Dreams.

In July 2004, Slankard appeared on an episode of TLC's What Not to Wear. The episode first aired July 16, 2004.

Slankard's album Freaky Little Story appeared on the Acoustic Guitar 2004 Top 5 list and became a top ten seller on the Amazon CD sales chart. In 2005, she released the EP album A Little Extra Sun produced by Adam Rossi.

According to her web site, she was a semi-finalist in Discmaker's 2007 Independent Music World Series and International Songwriting Competition and finalist in the 2008 and 2009 Musician's Atlas/Borders Books Independent Music Awards. She was the January 2009 Top 5 artist in the Famecast Competition. She released her album A Token of the Wreckage in 2011.

In July 2011, Slankard (composer, guitar, mandolin, vocals ), Joel Ackerson (composer, engineer, guitar, mandolin, vocals), Zack Teran (upright bass, vocals), and Eric Andersen (composer, piano, vocals) formed The Novelists, a Reno-based lyrical rock band. The four singer-songwriters collaborated to produce the band's debut album, "Backstory", released January 1, 2012.

Slankard's music has also been featured on San Francisco radio's KFOG compilation CD. She was a final selection artist for RPM Direct Presents: Unsigned Artists Volume 3 compilation CD; an A&R Online featured artist; a Song and Film Spotlight artist; and, an Acoustic Cafe featured artist on the “One to Watch” syndicated radio program (sponsored by the USA Songwriting Competition).

Slankard was nominated for the 7th Annual Independent Music Awards for Folk/Singer Songwriter Song of the year for her song "The Happy Birthday". Slankard won the 8th annual Independent Music Awards Vox Pop award in the Best Cover Song category for her rendering of the song "America".

== Personal life ==
Slankard appeared on an episode of TLC's What Not to Wear in July 2004 and in a follow-up episode a year later.

== Equipment ==
Slankard's preferred equipment includes:

- Acoustic guitars: 1999 Guild D55 guitar, a 2000 Taylor 614ce guitar, and a Takamine C132S
- Electric guitar: Daisy Rock's Rock Candy Special
- Keyboard: Korg Triton Extreme EXT61
- Home recording equipment: MOTU 828mkII; Digidesign Mbox 2 with Pro Tools LE

== Discography ==
=== Studio albums ===
- Lady Is a Pirate (2001)
- Freaky Little Story (2003)
- A Token of the Wreckage (2011)
- Running on Machinery (2015)
- California & Other Stories (2022)

=== Extended plays ===
- A Little Extra Sun (2005)

=== Appearances on other albums and singles ===
- Stop and Go Jeff Campbell (2012)
- In Spite of Everything Jeff Campbell (2013)
- "The Kitchen Sink" Jeff Campbell (TBA)
