= A Token of the Wreckage =

Studio album by Megan Slankard
- Released: March 8, 2011
- Genre: Pop/Rock
- Length: 47:40
- Label: Daily Acts
- Producer: Megan Slankard

Megan Slankard chronology
A Little Extra Sun (2005)	A Token of the Wreckage (2011)	Running on Machinery (2015)

Singles from A Token of the Wreckage
- 1. "A Token of the Wreckage" Released: November 30, 2010

A Token of the Wreckage is the third studio album and fourth overall release by American independent singer Megan Slankard, released on March 8, 2011.

== Track listing ==
1. "A Token of the Wreckage" (Slankard) – 5:19
2. "Fair Enough and Farewell" (Slankard, Blau) – 4:00
3. "Our Little Secret" (Slankard, Symonds) – 3:24
4. "The Tragic Life of Caleb" (Slankard) – 3:40
5. "My Obsession with Bees" (Slankard) – 3:31
6. "The Happy Birthday" (Slankard) – 3:21
7. "The Pain of Growing Up" (Slankard) – 3:56
8. "Soundtrack" (Slankard) – 2:47
9. "Beautiful Makeshift" (Slankard) – 4:17
10. "The Last Thing You Say" (Slankard) – 3:58
11. "You and Your Bright Ideas" (Slankard) – 4:16
12. "Show Up" (Slankard) – 5:11

== Release and promotion ==
In the summer of 2010, Slankard posted on her official website asking for donation from fans to fund the recording of her first music video. It was revealed that the video would be for the lead single of her album, the title track "A Token of the Wreckage". The video was recorded in September 2010 in San Rafael, CA directed by Matthew Ward. It was officially released on November 30, 2010.

Slankard is on a concert tour of the United States to promote the release of her album, which began with an album release party held on March 5, 2011, in San Francisco, California.

== Personnel ==
- Danny Blau – rhythm guitar, keyboard
- Kyle Capistra – drums, percussion, background vocals
- James Deprato – electric guitar
- Jeff Symonds – bass
