= Deadbeat Darling =

American rock band

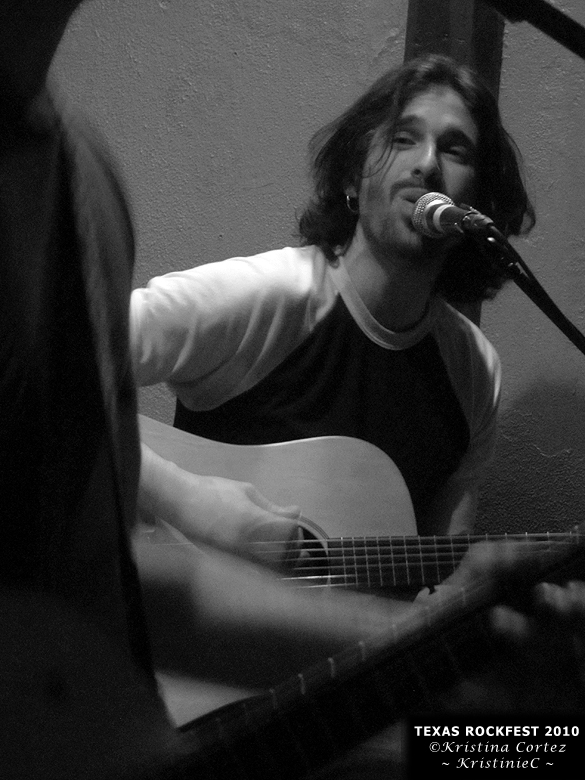
- Deadbeat Darling performing at the Bowery Ballroom in 2012. Photo by Nichole Nawfel

Background information
- Origin: Brooklyn, New York, USA
- Genres: Alternative rock
- Years active: 2006–Present
- Labels: Deadbeat Records; Spearhavoc Records
- Members: Joseph King; Ian Everall; Evan Howard; Mohit Bhansali
- Past members: Sanjay Jain; Alex Wong

Deadbeat Darling is a four-piece rock band which formed in New York City in 2006. The band's sound is a blend of several musical genres, including rock, surf, reggae, dub and trip hop. They have released one EP and two full-length albums.

BlackBook Magazine also named Deadbeat Darling one of the Best Bands of CMJ 2010.

The band recorded their next record, The Angel's Share, at Monnow Valley Studio in Wales with Grammy Award winning producer Ken Nelson (Coldplay, Gomez, The Charlatans) and Grammy Award winning mixer Adrian Bushby (Foo Fighters, Muse, My Bloody Valentine) in May 2011, and released the album in April 2012.

== Members ==
- Joseph King - guitar, lead vocals
- Mohit Bhansali - lead guitar, backing vocals
- Evan Howard - drums, percussion, effects
- Ian Everall - bass

== Discography ==
- Belle Epoch, EP (2007)
- Weight of Wandering (2009)
- The Angels Share (2012)

== Tours ==
- February/March 2013 - California Tour
- Summer 2012 - Dead of Summer Tour with Girl in a Coma
- Spring 2012 - South by Southwest Tour
- February 2012 - UK Tour
- Summer 2011 - Dead of Summer Tour
- May 2010 - East vs. West Tour with The Tender Box
- October 2010 - UK Tour
- Summer 2009 - Support for Blue October
- Summer 2008 - Goodnight Summer Tour with Deep Ella and Johnny Goudie
- May 2008 - Liars and Saints Tour with Johnny Goudie and Alpha Rev
