= Aims (album) =

Studio album by Vienna Teng
- Released: September 24, 2013
- Genre: Pop
- Length: 39:35
- Label: Soltruna Records
- Producer: Cason Cooley

Vienna Teng chronology
| The Moment Always Vanishing (2010) | Aims (2013) |

Professional ratings
Review scores
| Source | Rating |
|---|---|
| Popmatters | 6/10 discs |

Aims is the fifth studio album by American pop singer-songwriter Vienna Teng. Produced by Cason Cooley, the work was released on September 24, 2013.

The album brought Teng four awards in the thirteenth annual Independent Music Awards: Adult Contemporary Album, A Cappella Song (for "The Hymn of Acxiom"), Pop Song (for "Level Up"), and Social Action Song (for "Level Up"). This was the first time an artist received four awards in one year.

== Background ==
The album was made while Teng was in graduate school at the University of Michigan Erb Institute for Global Sustainable Enterprise and was inspired by the city of Detroit. In previous albums, Teng relied almost solely on the piano, but for this album, Teng relied largely on Cooley's sound library with tracks ranging from African percussion to an orchestra of instruments.

== Production ==
The album was produced by Cason Cooley, who has worked on albums for Chris Mason and Mindy Gledhill.

== Track listing ==
1. Level Up – 3:53
2. In the 99 – 3:38
3. Landsailor – 3:45
4. Close to Home – 3:56
5. The Hymn of Acxiom – 3:49
6. Oh Mama No – 2:12
7. Copenhagen (Let Me Go) – 3:03
8. Flyweight Love – 4:02
9. The Breaking Light – 4:21
10. Never Look Away – 3:33
11. Goodnight New York – 3:23
