= Delta Rae =

American folk rock band

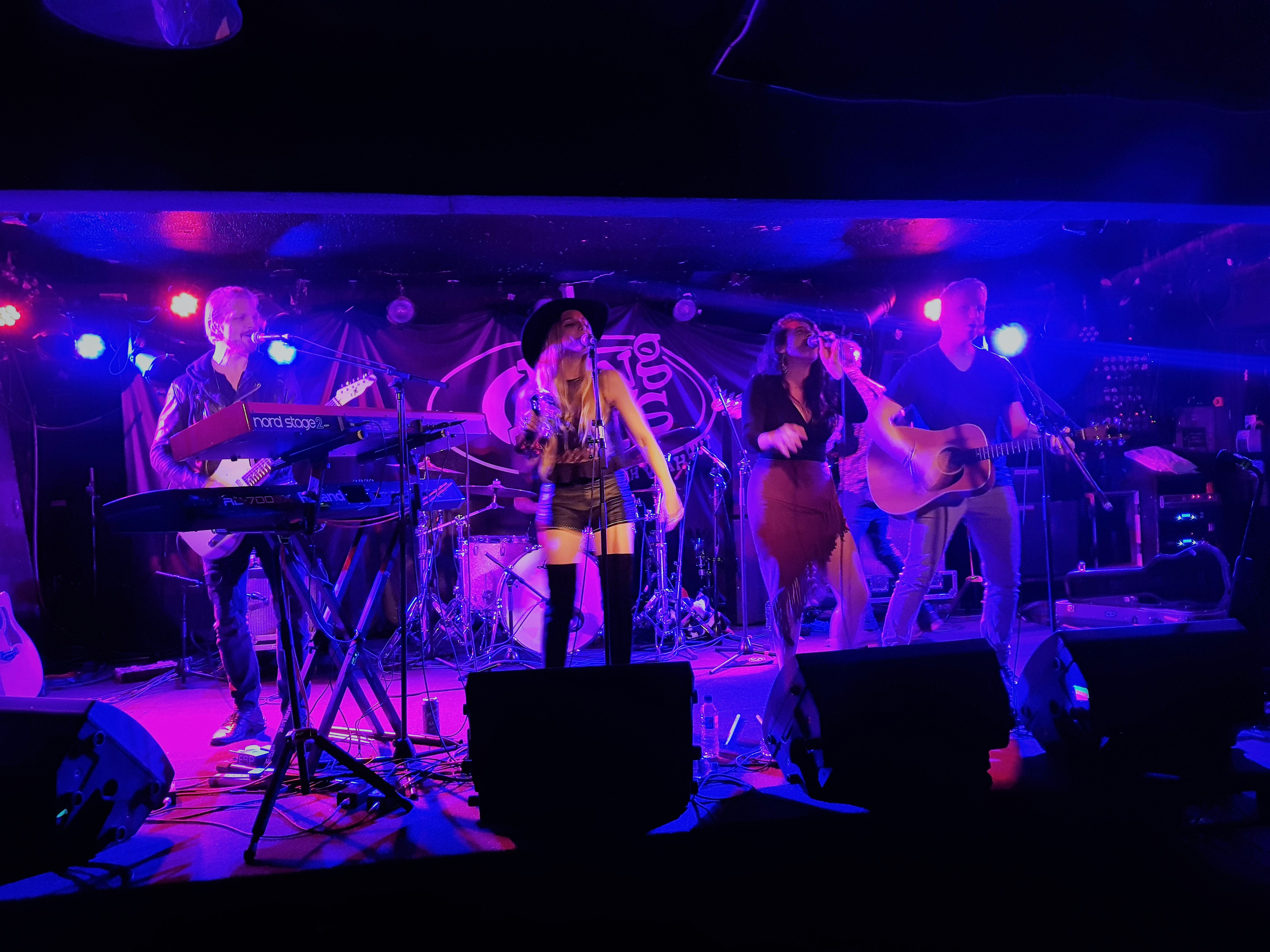

Background information
- Origin: Durham, North Carolina, United States
- Genres: Blues rock, country rock, folk rock, roots rock
- Years active: 2009–present
- Labels: Valory Music Co., Sire/Warner Bros.
- Members: Grant Emerson; Elizabeth Hopkins; Brittany Hölljes; Eric Hölljes; Ian Hölljes; Mike McKee
- Website: http://www.deltarae.com

Delta Rae (/reɪ/ RAY) is an American folk rock band formed in Durham, North Carolina. The band consists of siblings Ian Hölljes (vocals and guitar), Eric Hölljes (vocals, guitar, piano and keys) and Brittany Hölljes (vocals), as well as Elizabeth Hopkins (vocals), Mike McKee (percussion) and Grant Emerson (bass guitar). The band feels that they do not fit into a single musical genre, but have described their sound as "gospel-tinged country-rock, sensual blue-eyed soul and harmony-laden Americana."

== History ==
=== Hölljes siblings ===
Three of the members of Delta Rae are siblings and members of the Hölljes family. They grew up in the San Francisco Bay Area where their parents instilled in them a love of music, reading, and education.

Ian and Eric Hölljes began writing music together when they were 12 and 10 years old, respectively. The two of them write most of the songs for Delta Rae's music today.

The siblings grew up hearing stories of folklore, mythology, and mysticism from their mother, a Montessori school teacher. She would read Greek mythology to them and often make up melodies and music to accompany the stories. The band's name hails from a fictional story the Hölljes' mother wrote about a Southern girl named Delta Rae who summons the Greek gods to earth. Their mother is currently writing a book about this southern heroine.

The three Hölljes siblings joined a teen a cappella group as middle schoolers in San Rafael, California, called 'Til Dawn where they learned both how to write musical arrangements and how to sing as a group. In this a cappella group, they also met and became friends with their future Delta Rae bandmate, Elizabeth Hopkins.

=== Band formation ===
The band debuted at Duke University in October 2009. Ian graduated from Duke in 2007; Eric graduated from Duke in 2009. After Brittany graduated early from the University of California, Berkeley, also in 2009, and Liz had graduated from Fordham University, the band members all moved into a big house in the woods in Durham, North Carolina, and officially became a band in September 2009.

In 2010, the band added Mike McKee, who graduated from Campbell University, and Grant Emerson, who graduated from the University of North Carolina Wilmington. The 6-person formation is still in place today.

== Career ==
Their self-titled debut EP was released in 2010, after which they signed to Sire Records in 2012. Their debut album Carry the Fire was released on June 19, 2012. It included the singles "Morning Comes", "Dance in the Graveyards" and "Bottom of the River" which received airplay on VH1.

On November 19, 2013, they released the EP Chasing Twisters which included a new version of their single "If I Loved You" featuring Fleetwood Mac guitarist Lindsey Buckingham. Delta Rae toured in support of this release for much of 2014, including a set at Lollapalooza.

The band performed with other musicians at the 29th annual Farm Aid event, which was held on September 13, 2014, at Walnut Creek Amphitheatre in Raleigh, North Carolina.

Delta Rae released their second album After It All on April 7, 2015. It was preceded by the single "Scared" in addition to an East Coast tour.

In April 2015, they played their first Australian dates as part of the Byron Bay Bluesfest, which included Counting Crows and Jurassic 5.

The band relocated to Nashville and signed with Big Machine Label Group in February 2017 after a personnel shake-up at Warner. They quickly followed up with a couple of EP releases, A Long and Happy Life and The Blackbird Sessions.

From September through December 2018, they held a weekly residency in Nashville. Cheap Trick performed on the opening night.

In July 2019, Delta Rae announced they would be leaving Big Machine and a Kickstarter campaign was launched for a double album project - The Light and The Dark. The campaign passed the $30,000 goal immediately, making $60,000 within the first hour the campaign was live. It gained a significant boost as Taylor Swift's fans reacted to her comments on the Big Machine buyout. The overwhelming response raised over fifteen times the original goal and saw them become the fifth biggest music Kickstarter campaign. The first installment of the Kickstarter, titled The Light, was released on March 20, 2020.

Eric Holljes has worked as a producer on other projects, including the upcoming album from Carrie Welling entitled High Heels and Heavy Things. Welling was scheduled to be part of Delta Rae's 2020 tour, which was cancelled due to the COVID-19 pandemic.

The Dark, a sister album to The Light, was released in 2021.

== Discography ==
=== Studio albums ===
Title	Details	Peak chart positions				Sales
Title	Details	US	US Sales	US Heat	US Folk	Sales
Carry the Fire	Release date: June 15, 2012; Label: Sire Records, Warner Bros. Records; Formats: CD, Music Download	—	192	11	13	US: 59,000
After It All	Release date: April 7, 2015; Label: Sire Records, Warner Bros. Records; Formats: CD, Vinyl, Music Download	152	76	3	10	
The Light	Release date: March 20, 2020; Label: Never Die Records; Formats: CD, Vinyl, Music Download	—	45	—	—	
The Dark	Release date: March 19, 2021; Label: Never Die Records; Formats: CD, Vinyl, Music Download	—	25	10	23	
Acoustic	Release date: August 5, 2022; Label: Never Die Records; Formats: CD, Vinyl, Music Download	—	—	—	—	
Hours Before Morning	Release date: November 25, 2022; Label: Never Die Records; Formats: CD, Music Download	—	—	—	—	
"—" denotes releases that did not chart

=== Live albums ===
Title	Details
Live at Lincoln Theatre	Release date: January 20, 2012; Label: Self-Released; Formats: Music Download
The First Decade Live	Release date: June 26, 2020; Label: Self-Released; Formats: Music Download

=== Extended plays ===
Title	Details	Peak chart positions	Sales
Title	Details	US Heat	Sales
Delta Rae	Release date: May 19, 2010; Label: Self-Released; Formats: CD	—	
Chasing Twisters	Release date: November 15, 2013; Label: Sire Records, Warner Bros. Records; Formats: CD, Vinyl, Music Download	8	
A Long and Happy Life	Release date: March 25, 2017; Label: The Valory Music Co.; Formats: CD, Music Download	24	US: 2,400
The Blackbird Sessions	Release date: December 15, 2017; Label: The Valory Music Co.; Formats: Music Download	—	
"—" denotes releases that did not chart.

=== Singles ===
Year	Single	Peak chart positions	Album	Certifications
Year	Single	US AAA	Album	Certifications
2012	"Bottom of the River"	—	Carry the Fire	RIAA: Gold
2013	"If I Loved You" (featuring Lindsay Buckingham)	5	Carry the Fire	
2013	"Run"	—	Chasing Twisters	
2015	"Scared"	—	After It All	
2017	"A Long and Happy Life"	—	A Long and Happy Life [EP]	
2017	"No Peace in Quiet"	—	A Long and Happy Life [EP]	
"—" denotes releases that did not chart

=== Videography ===
Year	Title	Director
2011	"Bottom of the River"	Lawrence Chen
2012	"Morning Comes"	Martin Roe
2012	"Dance in the Graveyards"	Dirty Robber
2013	"If I Loved You"	Justin Coloma
2015	"Scared"	LAW
2017	"A Long and Happy Life"	David McClister
2018	"Do You Ever Dream?"	Lawrence Chen
2018	"Hands Dirty"	Eric Hölljes and Delta Rae
2020	"All Good People"	Delta Rae
2021	"No One Will Miss Me"	LAW
2022	"The Beast"	Delta Rae

=== Guest appearances ===
Year	Title	Artist
2012	"Forward"	NE-YO, Herbie Hancock, Johnny Rzeznik, Natasha Beddingfield
2020	"Stand-Ins"	Carrie Welling
2025	"I Have Never Been to Memphis"	Hölljes
