= Running on Machinery =

Studio album by Megan Slankard
- Released: May 19, 2015
- Genre: Alternative/Rock
- Length: 42:39
- Producer: Alex Wong

Megan Slankard chronology
A Token of the Wreckage (2011)	Running on Machinery (2015)	California & Other Stories (2022)

Singles from Running on Machinery
- 1. "Bones Live Forever" Released: October 31, 2014

Running on Machinery is the fourth studio album and fifth overall release by American independent singer Megan Slankard, released on May 19, 2015.

== Track listing ==
1. "Bones Live Forever" (Slankard, Blau, Caprista) – 3:13
2. "Diving In" (Slankard) – 4:10
3. "825" (Slankard, DePrato, Caprista) – 3:12
4. "Lost Together" (Slankard) – 3:37
5. "If I Knew (feat. Jeff Campbell)" (Slankard) – 4:02
6. "Like Always Alex" (Slankard) – 4:50
7. "What It's Worth" (Slankard) – 4:07
8. "Can't Keep it In" (Slankard, Caprista) – 4:05
9. "Taking My Chances" (Slankard) – 2:30
10. "What a Way to Fail" (Slankard) – 4:41
11. "Next to You (A Nuclear Love Song)" (Slankard) – 4:19

== Release and promotion ==
Running on Machinery was produced by Alex Wong, and recorded at Tiny Telephone Studios in San Francisco, Angel House South Nashville, and mixed by Eddie Jackson. Slankard held a pre-release performance for an album on October 18, 2014, and is scheduled to host a follow-up release show on October 16, 2015, in San Francisco, California.

== Personnel ==
- Danny Blau – rhythm guitar, keyboard
- Kyle Capistra – drums, percussion, background vocals
- James Deprato – electric guitar
- Jeff Symonds – bass
- Alex Wong – producer
