= Vienna Teng =

American musician (born 1978)

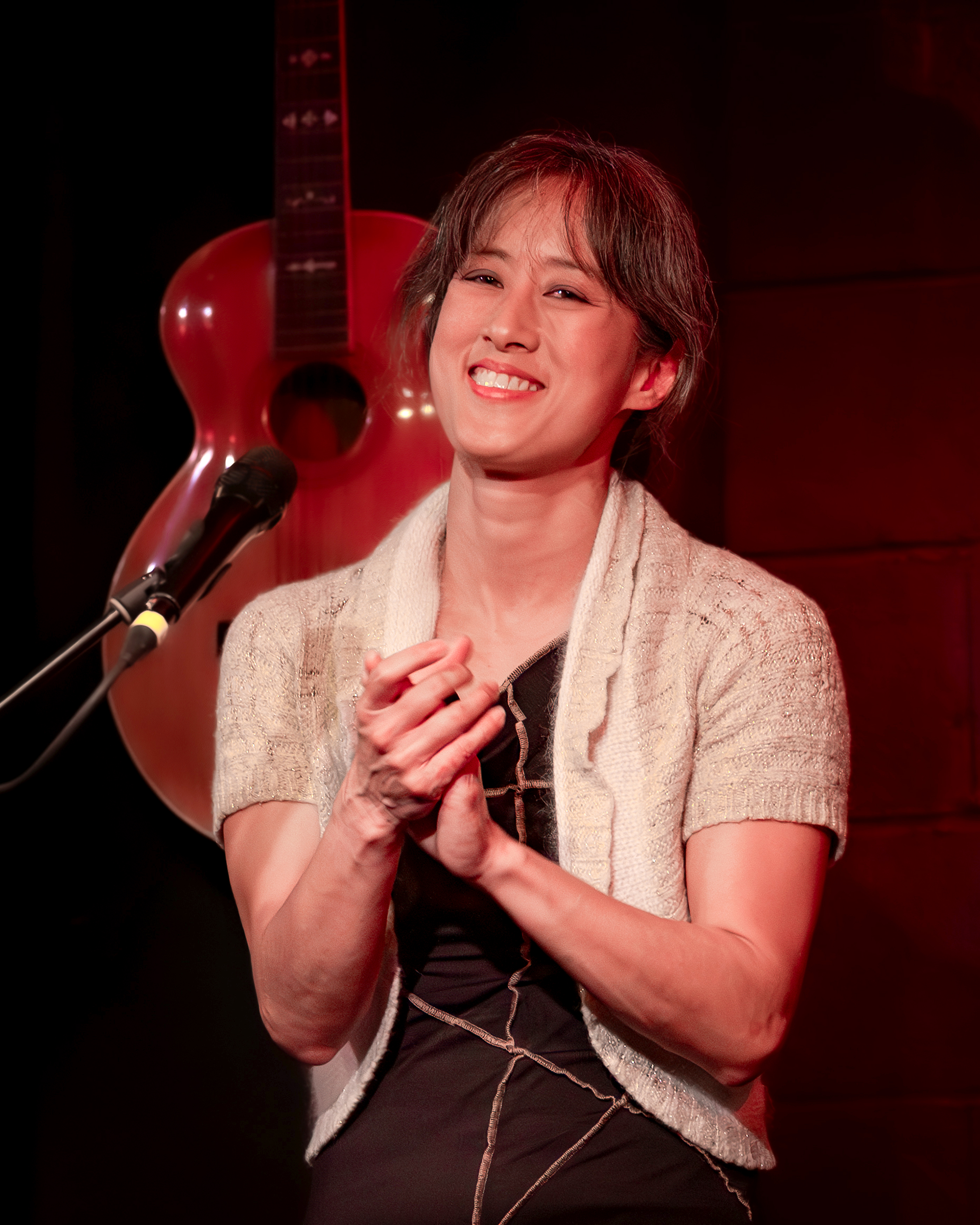
- Vienna Teng in 2025

Background information
- Born: Cynthia Yih Shih (Chinese: 史逸欣; pinyin: Shǐ Yìxīn); October 3, 1978 (age 48); Saratoga, California, US
- Genres: Folk; pop; indie folk; chamber pop
- Occupation: Musician
- Instruments: Vocals; piano; guitar
- Years active: 2002–present
- Labels: Virt, Rounder
- Website: viennateng.com

Cynthia Yih Shih (born October 3, 1978), better known by her stage name Vienna Teng, is an American pianist and singer-songwriter who lives in Washington, DC. Teng has released five studio albums: Waking Hour (2002), Warm Strangers (2004), Dreaming Through the Noise (2006), Inland Territory (2009) and Aims (2013). She has also released one live album, The Moment Always Vanishing (2009), on which she is double-billed with her percussionist, Alex Wong.

Teng's musical style incorporates folk, pop, classical piano, and a cappella.

== Early life, education, and early career ==
A native of Saratoga, California, she began playing classical piano at the age of five. Both her parents came from Taiwan. She was salutatorian at Saratoga High School. In 1996, while pursuing a degree in computer science at Stanford University, Teng joined the Stanford Harmonics, a student-run a cappella group.

She began recording her compositions at the studios in Stanford's Center for Computer Research in Music and Acoustics (CCRMA), intending to distribute her music on campus. Many of these recordings were eventually released in her début album Waking Hour. After graduating in 2000, Teng worked as a software engineer for Cisco Systems in San Jose, but she continued to write music and perform in her free time.

In 2002, Teng signed with Virt Records and quit Cisco Systems to focus on her musical career. After graduating from the University of Michigan in 2013 with master's degrees in science and business administration, she worked at McKinsey & Company full-time in the area of renewable energy.

== Career ==
=== Waking Hour and Warm Strangers ===
Teng's first major national exposure was on National Public Radio's Weekend Edition in January 2003, followed shortly thereafter by CBS's Late Show with David Letterman. She has since made appearances on the CBS Saturday Early Show, CNN's NewsNight with Aaron Brown and The Wayne Brady Show, and opened concerts for Joan Baez, Shawn Colvin, Joan Osborne, India.Arie, Brandi Carlile, Sarah Harmer and Marc Cohn. Although nearly all of Teng's recordings are in English, Warm Strangers features a hidden cover of "Green Island Serenade", a 1950s Taiwanese classic performed in Mandarin Chinese.

=== Dreaming Through the Noise ===
In 2006, Teng signed with Zoë/Rounder. From December 2006 to early 2007, Teng toured extensively in the United States to promote the release of her third album, Dreaming Through the Noise. Teng co-headlined with Duncan Sheik and opened for Madeleine Peyroux. She began the Green Caravan Tour in April 2007, accompanied by cellist Marika Hughes, violinist Dina Maccabee, and percussionist Alex Wong, along with opening acts such as David Berkeley and Jenny Owen Youngs. She performed a cover version of Radiohead's "Idioteque" during this time. In 2008, she relocated from California to New York City, and performed in Central Park on Earth Day at the Green Apple Festival.

=== Inland Territory and study at the University of Michigan ===
Her fourth album, Inland Territory, was released in 2009. Teng stated that the lyrics to "Grandmother Song" from Inland Territory are nearly a verbatim translation of a lecture that Teng received from her Mandarin-speaking grandmother, voicing her disapproval of Teng's career choice.

In 2010, Teng announced to her fans that she had been accepted into the Erb Institute for Global Sustainable Enterprise at the University of Michigan. Through the program, she received an MBA from the Ross School of Business and an MS from the School of Natural Resources and Environment. During this period, Teng moved to Ann Arbor, Michigan, where she continued to perform and compose music, although she did not tour as frequently as she had before enrolling. After graduating from the University of Michigan in 2013, she worked at McKinsey & Company full-time in the area of renewable energy.

=== Aims ===
Teng's fifth studio album, titled Aims, was inspired by Detroit and released in September 2013. From September to December 2013 Teng went on a tour across the United States and Western Europe to promote the new material. During this tour, she performed as a trio with Alex Wong and Jordan Hamlin, two other musicians who appeared on the album. The album was released in a standard edition and in deluxe edition sold through Teng's website.

== Personal life ==
By 2018, Teng was living in Boulder, Colorado. As of 2024, she lives in Washington, DC.

In early 2019, Teng announced her marriage to Jacob Corvidae. Their daughter, Arcadia, was born in February 2020. Additionally, Teng is a step-parent to Corvidae's two children from a previous relationship.

== Discography ==
- Waking Hour (2001)
- Waking Hour (2002)
- Warm Strangers (2004)
- Dreaming Through the Noise (2006)
- Inland Territory (2009)
- The Moment Always Vanishing (2009) – live with Alex Wong
- Aims (2013)
- The Fourth Messenger (2015) – with Tanya Shaffer
- We’ve Got You (2024)
