= Brittany Hölljes =

Lead singer of Delta Rae

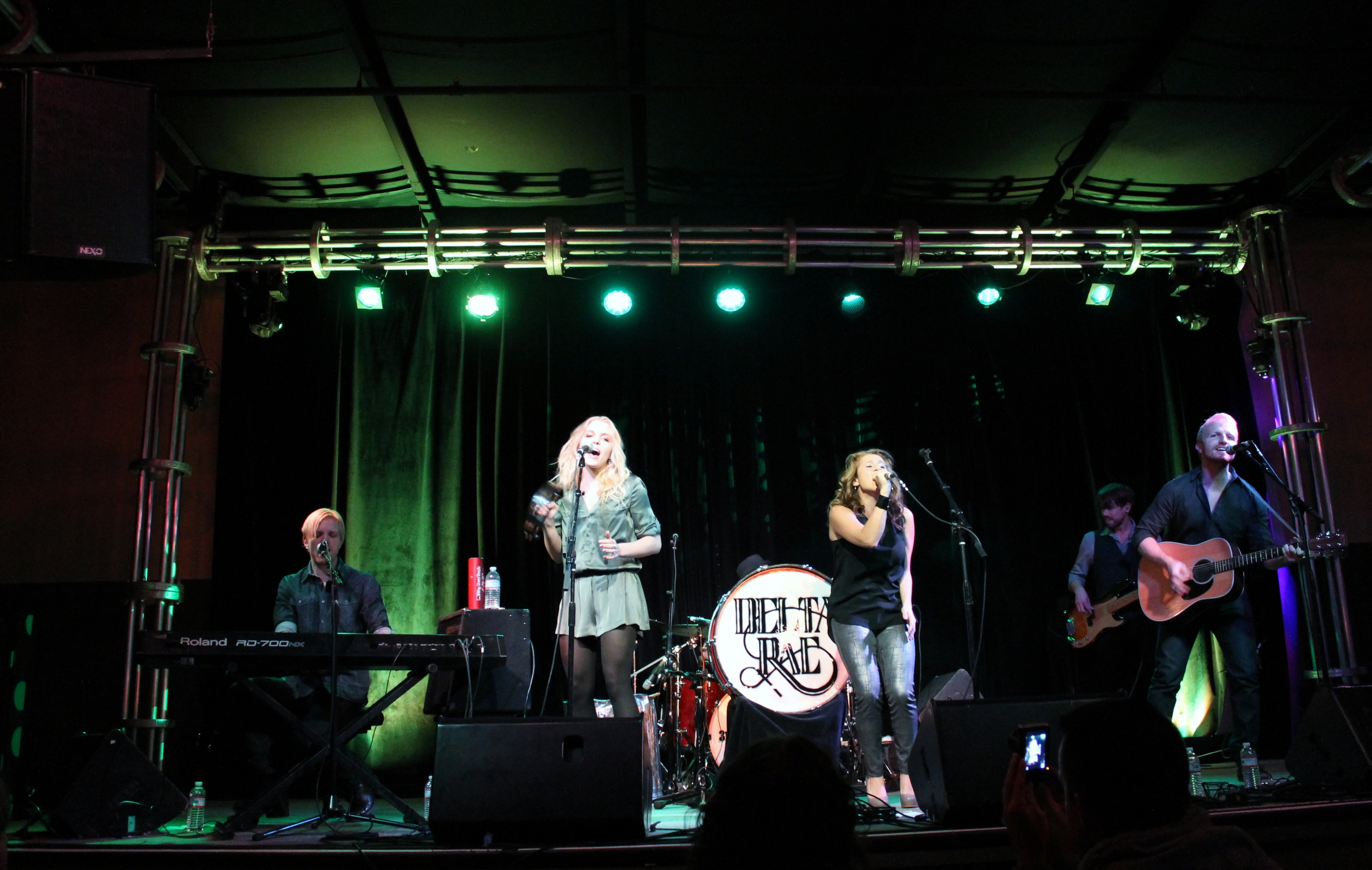
- Hölljes (left) performing with Delta Rae in 2012
- Born: August 14, 1989 (age 36)
- Education: University of California, Berkeley
- Known for: Lead singer of Delta Rae
- Relatives: Eric Hölljes (brother), Ian Hölljes (brother)

Brittany Hölljes is a singer, songwriter, and activist. She is one of the lead singers of the American band Delta Rae.

== Early life and education ==
Hölljes was born in Nashville and grew up in the San Francisco Bay Area with her two brothers, Ian Hölljes and Eric Hölljes. Their parents instilled in them a love of music, reading, and education. At age 15, she dropped out of high school and enrolled at the College of Marin for two years before transferring to the University of California, Berkeley, where she graduated in 2009 at the age of 19. She earned a degree in ancient Mediterranean religion with an emphasis in Greek mythology.

Soon after her college graduation in 2009, Hölljes moved to Raleigh, North Carolina to start the band Delta Rae with her brothers, Ian and Eric, and their long-time friend Elizabeth Hopkins. She moved to Nashville, Tennessee in December 2017.

== Music ==
Brittany Hölljes is known for the "witchy" quality she often brings to her singing, such as in Delta Rae's hit song "Bottom of the River." She is also known for her rock-style of singing, like in the song, "Fire", which gained notability from Rolling Stone.

Several songs by Delta Rae have been inspired by Brittany Hölljes' romantic pursuits, including "Fire" and "Do You Ever Dream?." "Fire" describes an ex-boyfriend who "had a bad habit of telling strangers about our relationship problems", while "Do You Ever Dream" depicts an ex who didn't share Brittany Hölljes' "imagination or vision for the future".

In February 2020, Delta Rae released "From One Woman to Another," which is the first song that Brittany Hölljes took the lead on writing for the band. She said she wrote the song "not to chastise folx looking for a casual connection, but to say to those holding out for love: Let go of the people not meant for you, make room for a true love to come along and know you're not alone."

== Artistry and influences ==
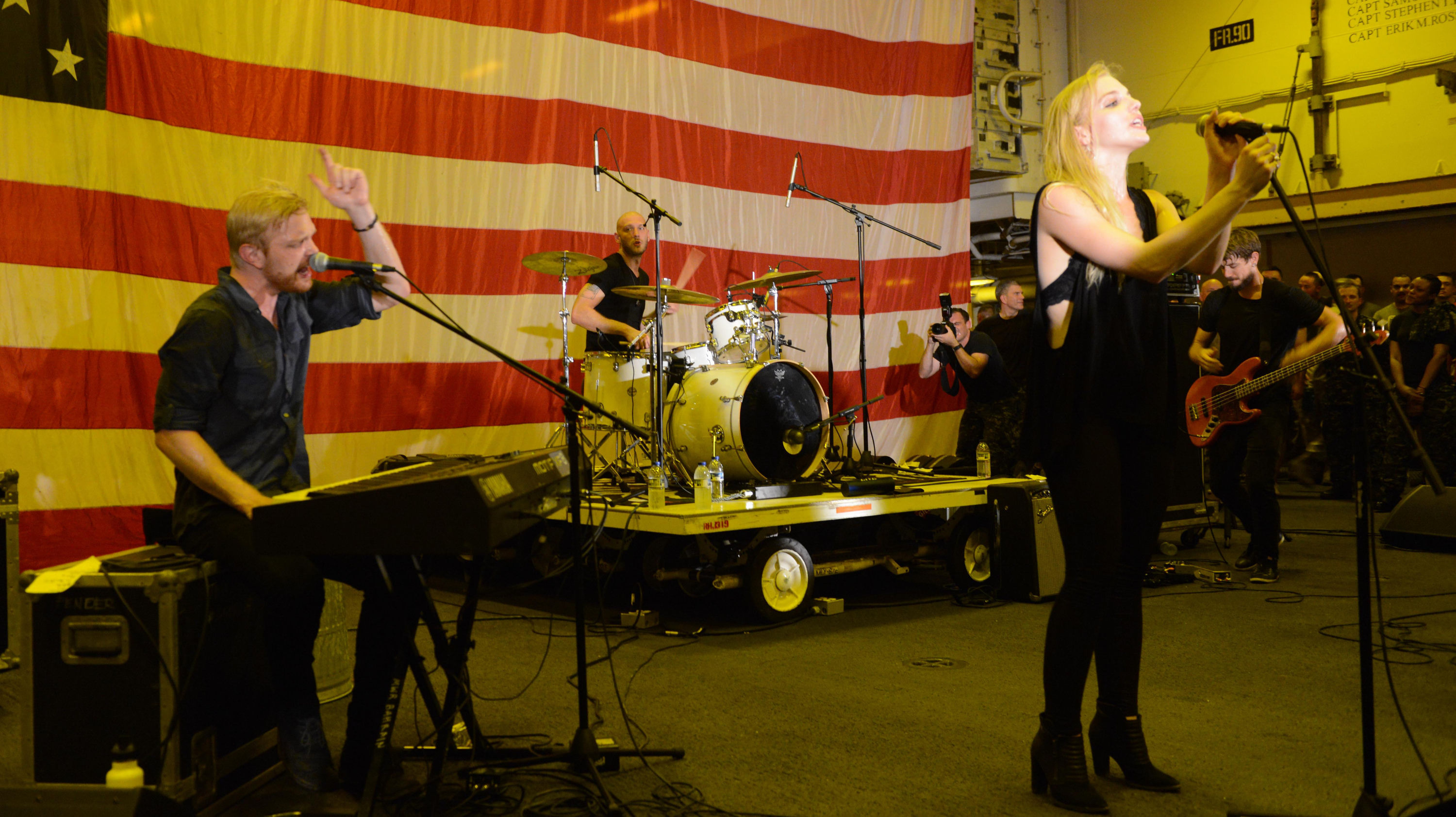
Hölljes (right) performing with Delta Rae aboard USS Bataan (LHD-5) in 2014

Brittany Hölljes, like the rest of Delta Rae, believes in the power of music. She often speaks of the significant impact of the Delta Rae's "diehard fans" on the band and on her. She once said, "I hope that when people listen to our music, they feel the love and care that is in it. I hope that people can take the songs that are imbued with magic and folklore and that can awaken some part of their spirit. I hope that people can listen to our songs that have greater messages, political messages and use them as a rallying cry. I just hope that the music we are creating will bring people together. I think we are making an effort to really say something and be an American band. I hope that in some way, we help shift consciousness to a positive place and bring dark things into the light."

== Activism ==
Brittany Hölljes is a vocal activist around public interest issues such as Women's rights, #MeToo movement, Black Lives Matter, environmental activism, and immigration rights, among others. She has also used her platform to urge her fans to vote.

Brittany Hölljes was sexually assaulted when she was 13, which she publicly announced in 2018 through both the publishing of a personal essay and the release of a Delta Rae song called "Hands Dirty." She co-wrote the song with her brother and fellow Delta Rae band member, Ian Hölljes. It was released just days after the Kavanaugh hearings because, as she said, "I can't hold it back anymore."

She spoke about her reasons for writing this song: "We wrote "Hands Dirty" because we refuse to give up on the inevitable, equitable future. We believe that women will rise and claim our place as leaders in this world because the future is up to us – as women and for anyone who believes in equality. Women are not a monolith, we have diverse beliefs, but we all will benefit when women are in positions of power — representing our diversity of experiences and inspiring the next generation to further the progress."

Brittany Hölljes is also the lead singer for the song, "All Good People", which is an activism song Delta Rae wrote in response to the Charleston church shooting and in support of the Black Lives Matter movement.
