= Virt Records =

Virt Records is an independent record label based in Seattle, USA.

Virt artists are primarily singer/songwriters.

== Artists signed to Virt Records ==
Current

- Ellery
- The Bittersweets
- Shane Nicholson
- Brenda Weiler
- Beth Boucher
- Rachel Gaudry

Former

- Vienna Teng

== See also ==
- List of record labels
