= United States Army Recruiting Command =

U.S. Army's primary source of recruitment

United States Army Recruiting Command (USAREC)
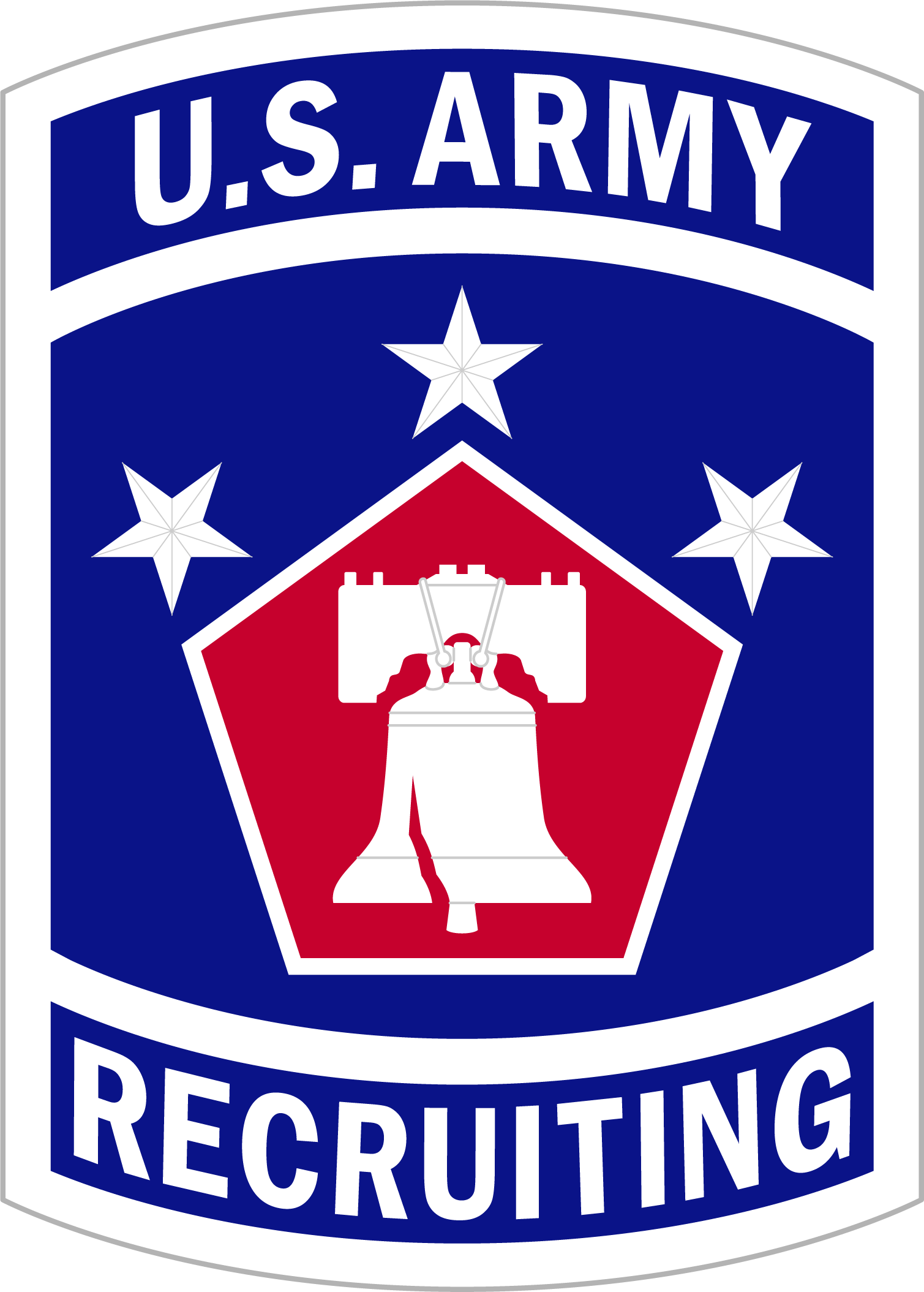
- USAREC shoulder sleeve insignia (SSI)
- Founded: 1964
- Country: United States
- Branch: United States Army
- Type: Army Command
- Role: Recruiting and Accessions
- Part of: United States Army Transformation and Training Command
- Garrison/HQ: Fort Knox, Kentucky, U.S.
- Motto: "Provide the Strength"

Commanders
- Commanding General: LTG Johnny K. Davis
- Deputy Commanding General (Operations): BG Eric Van Den Bosch
- Command Sergeant Major: CSM Joseph W. Wilson

Insignia
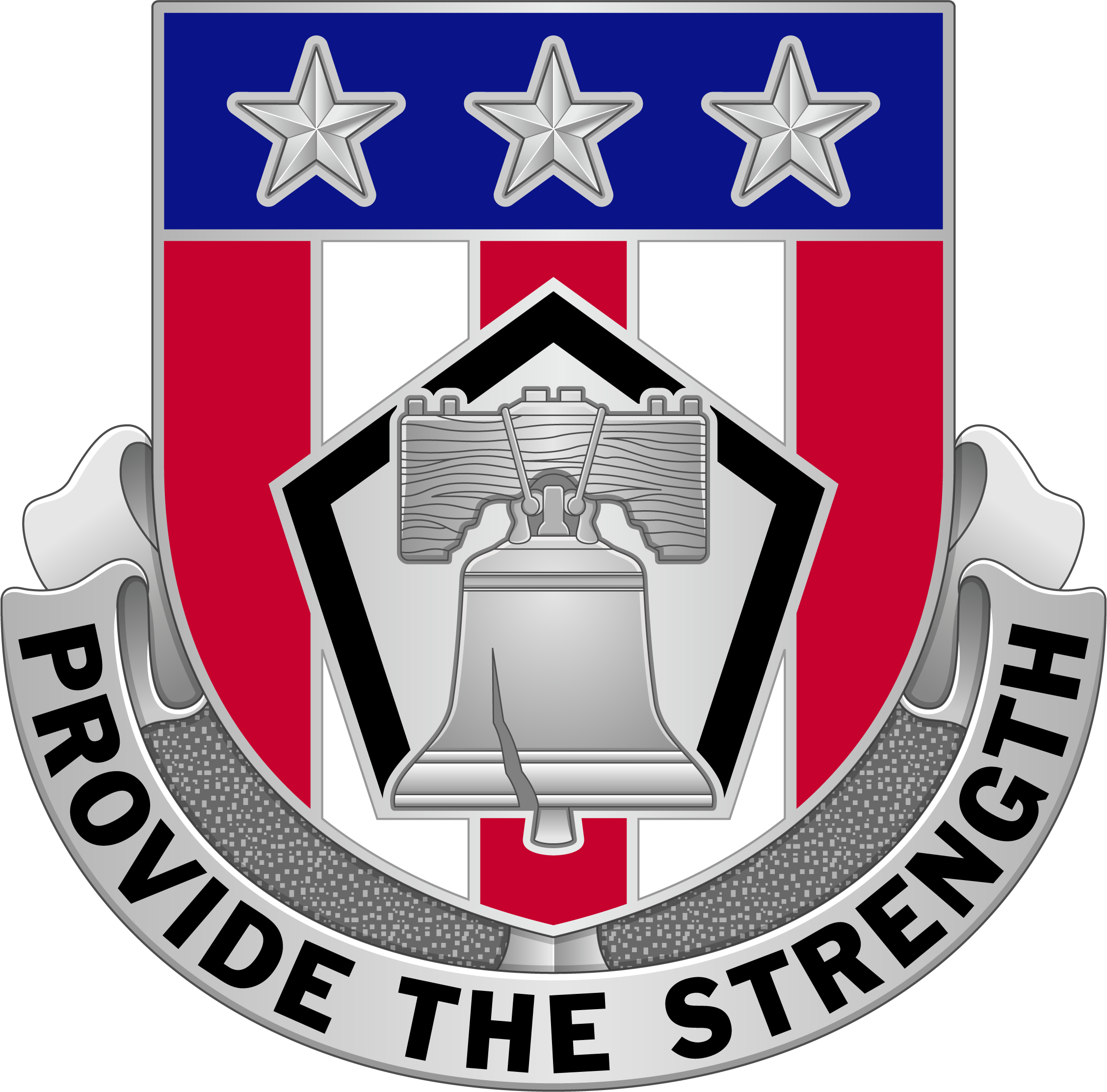
- Distinctive unit insignia

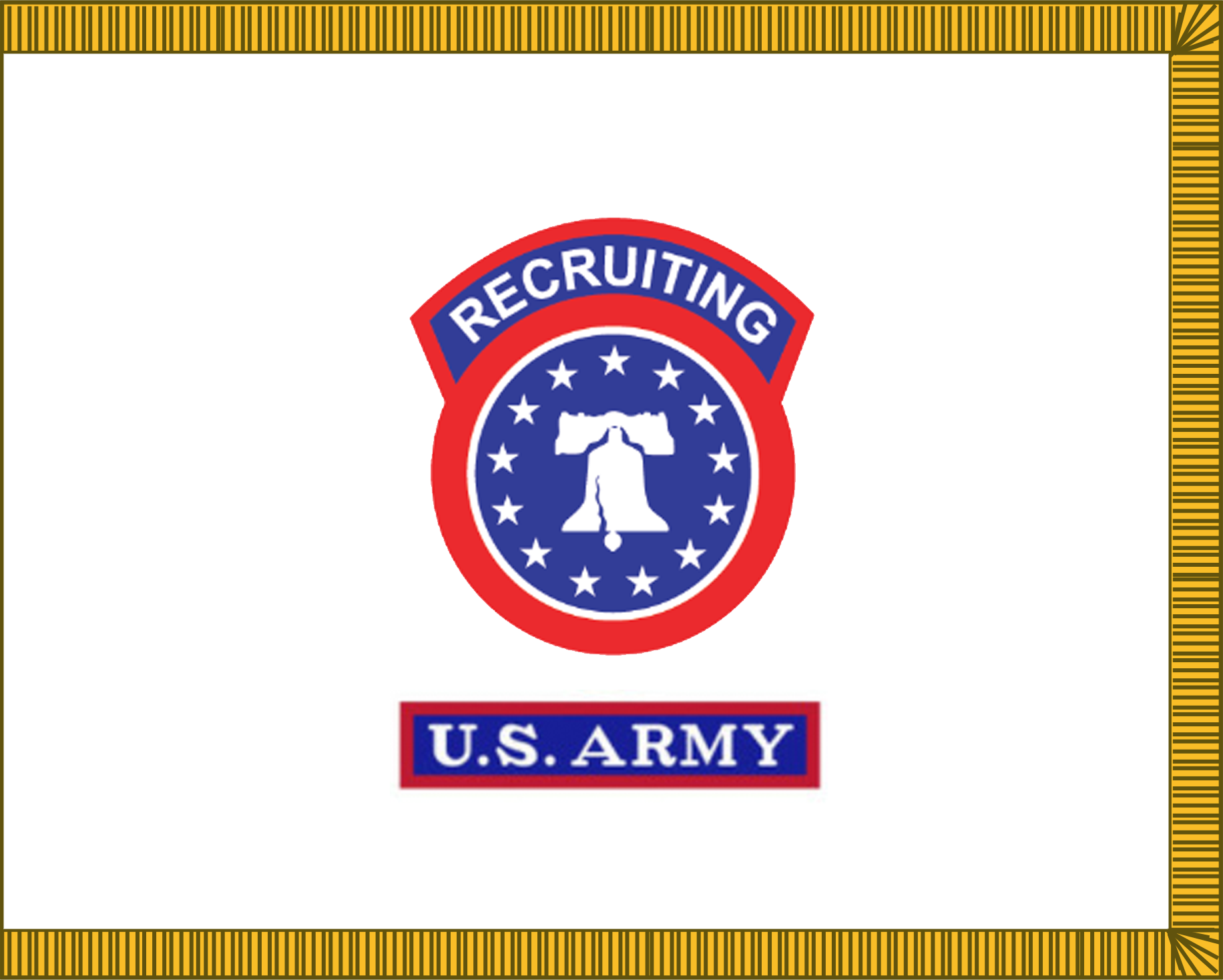
- US Army Recruiting Command Flag

The United States Army Recruiting Command (USAREC, yoo-ZUH-rek), located at Fort Knox, Kentucky, is responsible for the recruitment and accession of new Soldiers for the United States Army and Army Reserve. Recruiting operations are conducted throughout the United States, U.S. territories, and at U.S. military facilities in Europe, Asia, and the Middle East. This process includes the recruiting, medical and psychological examination, induction, and administrative processing of potential service personnel.

USAREC is a major command of the United States Army (directly reporting to Headquarters, Department of the Army, or HQDA), and is commanded by a Lieutenant General and assisted by a Deputy Commanding General (Brigadier General) and a Command Sergeant Major. The Command employs nearly 15,000 military and civilian personnel, the majority being Soldiers that are screened and selected to serve on recruiting duty for three to four years. Upon completing their recruiting assignment, these Soldiers can either return to their primary military occupational specialty (MOS) or volunteer to remain in the recruiting career field; those that remain in the recruiting career field are considered cadre recruiters and comprise the majority of the enlisted leadership of the command, providing experience, training, and continuity to the recruiting force.

== History ==
=== Revolutionary War to Civil War ===
Recruiting for the U.S. Army began in 1775 with the raising and training of the Continentals to fight in the American Revolutionary War. The Command traces its organizational history to 1822, when Major General Jacob Jennings Brown, commanding general of the Army, initiated the General Recruiting Service. For much of the rest of the 19th century, recruitment was left to the regimental recruiting parties, usually recruiting in their regional areas as was the practice in Europe.

Up to the commencement of the American Civil War, two types of forces existed in the United States that performed their own recruiting: those for the Regular Army, and those for the state Militia.

Due to severe shortage of troops after the first year of the war, conscription was introduced by both the Union and the Confederacy to enable continuing of operations on a thousand-mile front. Conscription was first introduced in the Confederacy by President Jefferson Davis on the recommendation by General Robert E. Lee on 16 April 1862. The United States Congress enacted by comfortable majorities the Enrollment Act of 1863 on 3 March after two weeks of debate. As a result, approximately 2,670,000 men were conscripted for federal and militia service by the Northern states.

=== World War I and II ===
The realization that volunteers could never again be depended on for service was clear in the post-war analysis, but the dependence on them prevailed until the commencement of World War I when President Woodrow Wilson, argued for America's exclusion from the European war, believed that there would be found sufficient volunteers to meet the nation's military needs. However, European experiences with industrial warfare prevailed, and two years later Congress passed the Selective Service Act of 1917. There were two primary reasons for President Wilson approving conscription: he recognized the efficiency and equity of the draft over the difficult-to-manage system of inducting and training volunteers, and that by opting for conscription, he realized the possibility of blocking one of his leading political critics and opponents, former President Theodore Roosevelt, from raising a volunteer force to lead in France. The Act was however very selective in that "the draft 'selected' those men the Army wanted and society could best spare: 90 percent of the draftees were unmarried, and 70 percent were farm hands or manual hands."

Conscription was again used to quickly grow the nation's small peacetime Army in 1940 into a wartime Army of more than 8.3 million personnel. However, there was a society-wide support for the conscription during World War II, in part due to efforts of the National Emergency Committee (NEC) of the Military Training Corps Association led by Greenville Clark who became known as the "Father of Selective Service." The Congress, faced with imminent need to mobilize, still took three months of debate until finally passing the Selective Training and Service Act (STASA) of 1940 on 16 September 1940. Nearly 50 million men registered and 10 million were inducted into armed forces under the Act.

Although the STASA was extended after the war, it ended on 31 March 1947, and the Army had to turn to recruiting volunteers again, requiring and estimated 30,000 volunteers a month, but seeing only 12,000 enlisting.

=== Cold War ===
With the Cold War looming, Congress authorized the Selective Service Act of 1948 to enable President Harry S. Truman to provide for 21 months of active Federal service, with all men from ages 18 to 26 required to register. This Act was extended due to the start of the Korean War, and replaced by the Universal Military Training and Service Act of 1951 by revising the earlier Act. The new Act extended the president’s authority to induct citizens for four years, granted him the authority to recall reservists, lowered the draft age to 18, lengthened the term of service to two years, and cancelled deferments for married men without children.

With the end of the Korean War, the draft remained in force, but became increasingly unpopular, although it continued to encourage volunteers and selected the bare minimum of annual recruits. Repeatedly renewed by overall majorities in Congress in 1955, 1959, and 1963, its final extension in 1967 was also passed by a majority of Congress, but only after a year of hearings and public debate. During the years of the Vietnam War, between 1965 and 1973, there were 1,728,254 inductions through selective service. There was, however, a direct effect on public support for the draft that was high even after the Korean War to its low in the early 1970s because draftees, who constituted only 16 percent of the armed forces, but 88 percent of infantry soldiers in Vietnam, accounted for over 50 percent of combat deaths in 1969, a peak year for casualties. Little wonder that the draft became the focus of anti-Vietnam activism.

=== All-Volunteer Force ===
With these political consequences in mind in 1969, President Nixon appointed a commission, led by former Secretary of Defense Thomas Gates, "to develop a comprehensive plan for eliminating conscription and moving toward an All-Volunteer Armed Force." However, even before this commission submitted its report on 13 May 1969, President Nixon informed Congress that he intended to institute a reform that would see the draftees replaced with volunteers in his Special Message to Congress on Reforming the Military Draft. In February 1970, the Gates Commission released its favorable AVF report which stated that, "We unanimously believe that the nation’s interests will be better served by an all-volunteer force, supported by an effective stand-by draft, than by a mixed force of volunteers and conscripts; that steps should be taken promptly to move in this direction."

The U.S. military became an all-volunteer force again in 1973. To help with facilitating the transition to an all-volunteer force, the Army created District Recruiting Commands (DRC) through the continental United States to direct the efforts of its recruiters among the civilian population. The DRC's became battalions in 1983.

=== 21st Century Recruiting Challenges ===
Since 2014, the Army has struggled to make its yearly recruiting contract goals and has relied on a combination of late-year recruiting surges and recruits in the Army's Future Soldier Program attending basic combat training earlier than originally scheduled to make up any shortcomings. However, the COVID-19 pandemic in 2020 and 2021 made it difficult for recruiters to access high schools and colleges which are the Army's traditional recruiting ground, followed by a strong post-pandemic economic rebound and businesses offering employee benefits comparable to those offered by military service has made the military a less attractive option for many young people. These challenges, combined with a shrinking pool of young Americans that meet the moral, physical, and education requirements to join, resulted in the Army missing its recruiting goals by nearly 15,000 soldiers in 2022 and 10,000 soldiers in 2023.

In August 2022, Secretary of the Army Christine Wormuth established the Army Recruiting and Retention Task Force to assess what is preventing the Army from meeting its recruiting goals and to find opportunities to inject innovative solutions and resolve long-standing challenges. Led by Maj. Gen. Deborah Kotulich, the 25-person task force worked with military leaders and civilian experts in recruitment and talent acquisition to come up with recommendations to improve the Army's accession systems and processes. October 3, 2023, the Army released the task force's recommendations to the public, which included:

- Raising USAREC to a three-star command reporting directly to the Secretary of the Army, and extending the commanding general's time in command to four years to give them time to implement and direct changes to the force.
- Creating two new Army MOSs, Talent Acquisition Specialist (42T) for enlisted Soldiers and Talent Acquisition Technician (420T) for warrant officers. These MOSs will eventually replace the current Recruiter (79R) MOS and end detailed recruiting assignments for Soldiers.
- Reassign the U.S. Army Cadet Command, based at Fort Knox, and the Army Enterprise Marketing Office, based in Chicago, Illinois, as subordinate commands under USAREC.
- Focus on recruiting college-age prospects. Traditionally, the Army has focused on high school seniors and recent graduates who are looking at potential job opportunities following graduation. However, with more young people attending college and the ever-increasing use of technology in the military, the need to change who recruiters look for has increased.
- Create an experimentation directorate within USAREC that can explore new recruitment methods and policies without the pressure of meeting recruiting goals.

== Organizational structure ==
USAREC consists of a Three Star Command headquarters, the United States Army Recruiting Division, the Army Enterprise Marketing Office, the United States Army Cadet Command, 80th Training Command, United States Army Training Command, the United States Army Drill Sergeant Academy, and the United States Army Recruiting and Retention College.

=== USAREC Headquarters ===
Headquarters, U.S. Army Recruiting Command

USAREC headquarters is located at Fort Knox, Kentucky, and provides the strategic command and support to the Army's recruiting force. More than 400 officers, enlisted members and civilian employees work in one of the command's eight directorates and 14 staff sections, conducting administration, personnel, resource management, safety, market research and analysis, and public relations operations in support of the recruiting mission and the Soldiers and civilians working to achieve it. The headquarters complex and the personnel working there are managed by a Headquarters Company commanded by a Captain and assisted by a First Sergeant.

=== U.S. Army Recruiting Division ===
USARD consists of a Command headquarters, five enlisted recruiting brigades, one medical and chaplain recruiting brigade, and the recruiting and retention college.

USAREC Enlisted Recruiting Brigades and Battalions

==== Enlisted Recruiting Brigades ====
Five enlisted recruiting brigades make up the bulk of USAREC's recruiting force, and are responsible for the achievement of nearly all of the Army and Army Reserve's yearly recruitment missions. Each brigade is commanded by a Colonel and assisted by a Command Sergeant Major, a Headquarters Company, and support staff. Each brigade commands between seven and eight recruiting battalions and is responsible for the operational command and control of all Army recruiting operations within one of five regional geographic areas.

==== Recruiting Battalions, Companies, and Stations ====
Forty-four enlisted recruiting battalions are responsible for the tactical, or day-to-day, command and control of 261 Army recruiting companies conducting recruiting operations within their specific geographic areas. Each battalion is commanded by a Lieutenant Colonel who is assisted by a Command Sergeant Major and a support staff, and provide the local-level command, planning, and guidance to six to eight recruiting companies and approximately 250 recruiters within their area of operations. Each company is commanded by a Captain who is assisted by a First Sergeant, and they lead approximately 30 to 45 recruiters located at one of 1,400 local recruiting stations spread throughout the cities and towns within the battalion's geographic area of operations.

Each Army Recruiting Station is led by a Station Commander, a recruiter holding the rank of Staff Sergeant or Sergeant First Class who oversees an office of three to 15 personnel.

Recruiting personnel serve as primary public representatives for the United States Army. Candidates selected for recruiting duties undergo screening prior to and during their assignments to evaluate suitability for public outreach and recruitment duties

==== Enlisted Recruiting Structure ====
The five enlisted recruiting brigades and their respective battalions are:

- U.S. Army 1st Recruiting Brigade, located at Fort George G. Meade, Maryland. This brigade consists of eight enlisted recruiting battalions and covers the Northeastern United States, as well as U.S. military bases in Europe, North Africa, and the Middle East.
  - U.S. Army Albany Recruiting Battalion, Watervliet, New York.
  - U.S. Army Baltimore Recruiting Battalion, Fort George G. Meade, Maryland
  - U.S. Army New England Recruiting Battalion, Portsmouth, New Hampshire
  - U.S. Army Harrisburg Recruiting Battalion, New Cumberland Army Depot, Pennsylvania
  - U.S. Army New York City Recruiting Battalion, Fort Hamilton, New York
  - U.S. Army Mid-Atlantic Recruiting Battalion, Lakehurst Naval Air Station, New Jersey
  - U.S. Army Syracuse Recruiting Battalion, Syracuse, New York
  - U.S. Army Richmond Recruiting Battalion, Richmond, Virginia
- U.S. Army 2nd Recruiting Brigade, located at Redstone Arsenal, Alabama. This brigade consists of eight enlisted recruiting battalions and covers the Southeastern United States, Puerto Rico, and the U.S. Virgin Islands.
  - U.S. Army Atlanta Recruiting Battalion, Atlanta, Georgia
  - U.S. Army Columbia Recruiting Battalion, Fort Jackson, South Carolina
  - U.S. Army Jacksonville Recruiting Battalion, Jacksonville, Florida
  - U.S. Army Miami Recruiting Battalion, Miami, Florida
  - U.S. Army Montgomery Recruiting Battalion, Maxwell Air Force Base, Alabama
  - U.S. Army Raleigh Recruiting Battalion, Raleigh, North Carolina
  - U.S. Army Tampa Recruiting Battalion, Tampa, Florida
  - U.S. Army Baton Rouge Recruiting Battalion, Baton Rouge, Louisiana
- U.S. Army 3d Recruiting Brigade, located at Fort Knox, Kentucky. This brigade consists of eight enlisted recruiting battalions and covers part of the Midwestern United States
  - U.S. Army Chicago Recruiting Battalion, Naval Station Great Lakes, Illinois
  - U.S. Army Cleveland Recruiting Battalion, Cleveland, Ohio
  - U.S. Army Columbus Recruiting Battalion, Columbus, Ohio
  - U.S. Army Indianapolis Recruiting Battalion, Indianapolis, Indiana
  - U.S. Army Great Lakes Recruiting Battalion, Lansing, Michigan
  - U.S. Army Milwaukee Recruiting Battalion, Milwaukee, Wisconsin
  - U.S. Army Minneapolis Recruiting Battalion, Fort Snelling, Minnesota
  - U.S. Army Nashville Recruiting Battalion, Nashville, Tennessee
- U.S Army 5th Recruiting Brigade, located at Fort Sam Houston, Texas. This brigade consists of seven enlisted recruiting battalions and covers the Southwestern United States and parts of the Midwestern and Western United States not covered by the 3d Recruiting Brigade and 6th Recruiting Brigade, respectively.
  - U.S. Army Dallas Recruiting Battalion, Irving, Texas
  - U.S. Army Denver Recruiting Battalion, Denver, Colorado
  - U.S. Army Houston Recruiting Battalion, Houston, Texas
  - U.S. Army Kansas City Recruiting Battalion, Kansas City, Missouri
  - U.S. Army Oklahoma City Recruiting Battalion, Oklahoma City, Oklahoma
  - U.S. Army San Antonio Recruiting Battalion, Fort Sam Houston, Texas
  - U.S. Army Phoenix Recruiting Battalion, Phoenix, Arizona
- U.S. Army 6th Recruiting Brigade, located at North Las Vegas, Nevada. This brigade consists of seven enlisted recruiting battalions and covers the Western United States, along with Alaska, Hawaii, Guam, American Samoa, Northern Mariana Islands, and U.S. military bases in Japan and South Korea.
  - U.S. Army Seattle Recruiting Battalion, Seattle, Washington
  - U.S. Army Portland Recruiting Battalion, Portland, Oregon
  - U.S. Army Los Angeles Recruiting Battalion, Encino, California
  - U.S. Army Northern California Recruiting Battalion, Sacramento, California
  - U.S. Army Central California Recruiting Battalion, Naval Air Station Lemoore, California
  - U.S. Army Southern California Recruiting Battalion, Mission Viejo, California
  - U.S. Army Salt Lake City Recruiting Battalion, Salt Lake City, Utah

==== Medical Recruiting Brigade ====
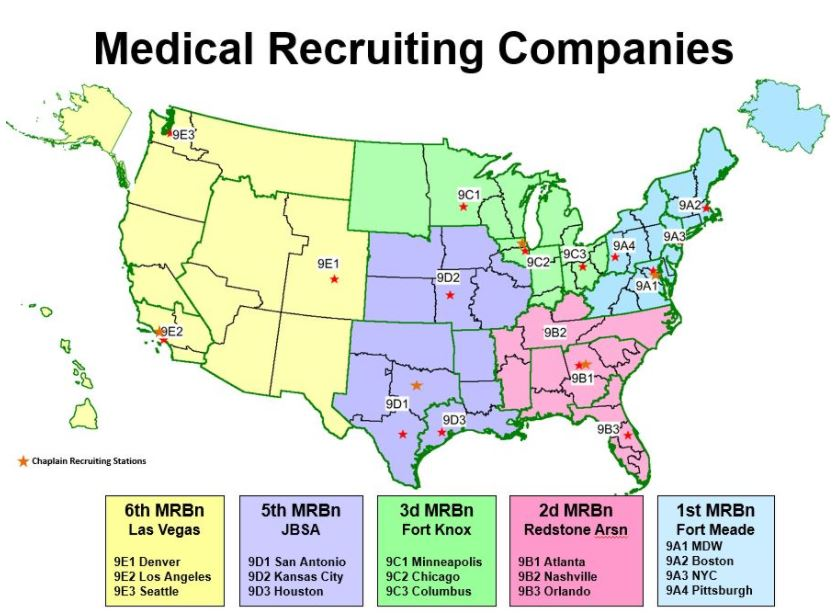
U.S. Army Medical Recruiting Brigade

The U.S. Army Medical Recruiting Brigade, is located at Fort Knox, Kentucky, and is tasked with recruiting medical professionals and chaplains for direct commission into the Regular Army and Army Reserve as Army Medical Department or Army Chaplain Corps officers along with providing operational oversight for the Army's special operations forces recruiting efforts. The brigade is commanded by a Colonel and assisted by a Command Sergeant Major, a Headquarters Company, and support staff that provide operational command and control to five medical recruiting battalions, the Special Operations Recruiting Battalion, and a chaplain recruiting branch covering the entire United States and Europe.

- U.S. Army 1st Medical Recruiting Battalion, Fort Meade, Maryland
- U.S. Army 2d Medical Recruiting Battalion, Redstone Arsenal, Alabama
- U.S. Army 3d Medical Recruiting Battalion, Fort Knox, Kentucky
- U.S. Army 5th Medical Recruiting Battalion, Fort Sam Houston, Texas
- U.S. Army 6th Medical Recruiting Battalion, Las Vegas, Nevada
- U.S. Army Special Operations Recruiting Battalion (Airborne), Fort Bragg, North Carolina
- U.S. Army Chaplain Recruiting Branch, Fort Knox, Kentucky

=== Army Enterprise Marketing Office ===
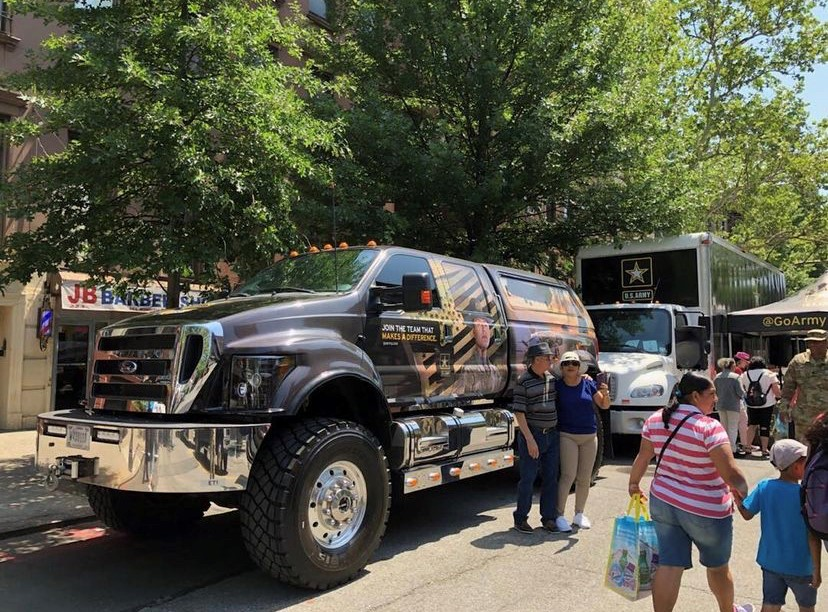
U.S. Army Mission Support Battalion

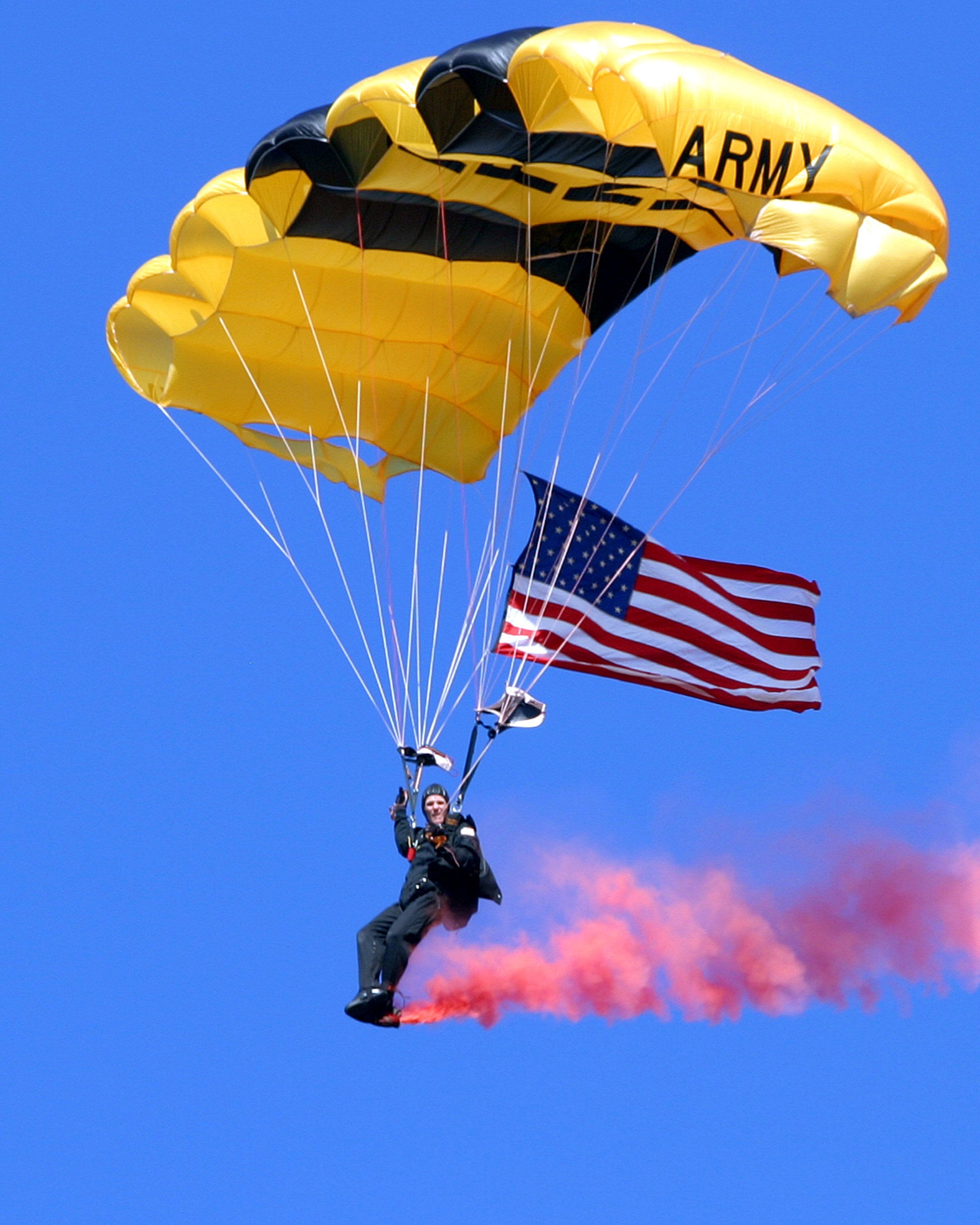
U.S. Army Parachute Team, "Golden Knights"

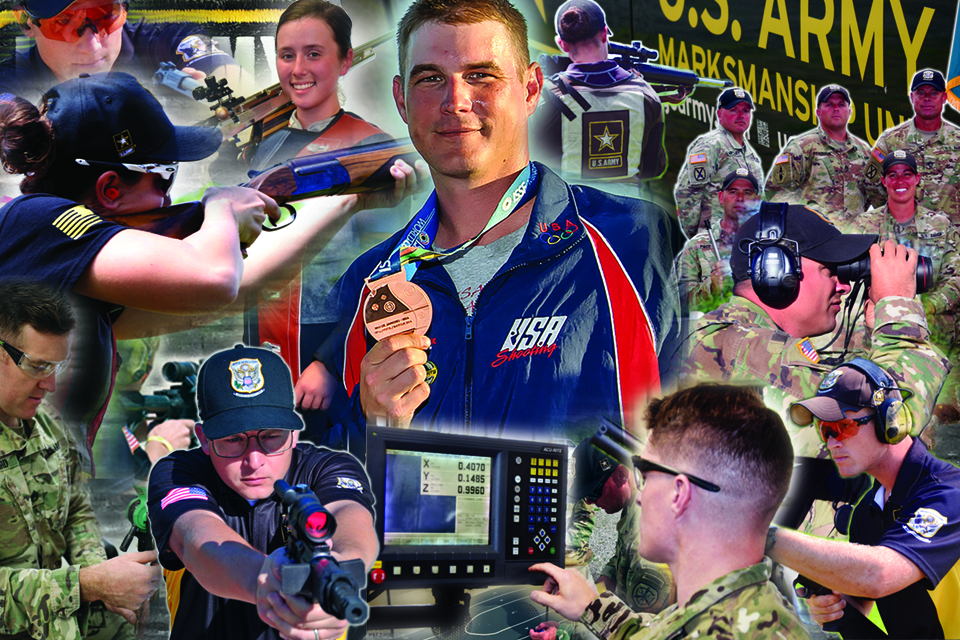
U.S. Army Marksmanship Unit

The Army Enterprise Marketing Office (AEMO) is the corporate marketing office for the United States Army. Located in the heart of Chicago, AEMO is responsible for developing, executing and analyzing national level marketing campaigns in support of the Army's recruiting mission. It is the higher headquarters of the U.S. Army Marketing and Engagement Brigade. The U.S. Army Marketing and Engagement Brigade, located at Fort Knox, Kentucky, serves as USAREC's recruiting support brigade and is tasked with providing both direct and indirect support to the enlisted and medical recruiting brigades through demonstrations, displays, and engagement with the American public to show the skills and benefits of Army service and enhance the Army's recruiting and retention missions. The brigade is commanded by a Colonel and assisted by a Command Sergeant Major, a Headquarters Company, and support staff that provide operational command and control to three specialized support battalions:

- The U.S. Army Mission Support Battalion, located at Fort Knox, Kentucky, provides recruiting support by managing display vehicles and exhibits support to the Army's recruiting efforts and specialized teams that interact with specific focus groups. The battalion manages a fleet of interactive exhibit trailers and static displays that can be set up at campuses, fairs, or other special events to allow people to interact with Army Soldiers and their equipment. In addition, the battalion manages three special outreach teams that are also stationed at Fort Knox:
  - The U.S. Army Warrior Fitness Team, which competes in regional and national physical fitness or athletic competitions such as the CrossFit Games or Strongman competitions, as well as attend health and fitness events to demonstrate the benefits of Army service in achieving and maintaining a healthy and active lifestyle.
  - The U.S. Army ESports Team, which competes in a variety of regional and national online Esports and gaming tournaments. Team members also livestream themselves playing games, competing in tournaments, and interacting with viewers on the Team's Twitch channel
  - The U.S. Army Musical Outreach Team is a group of talented musicians performing as the band “As You Were”. perform contemporary pop and rock music at high schools and events across the nation to build awareness of the U.S. Army and the career opportunities available.
  - The U.S. Army Outdoors Team, which competes in regional and national sport fishing events and also provide educational demonstrations to schools and at outdoor expos. The team helps build awareness of the U.S. Army and the outdoor and recreational opportunities available to Soldiers and their family members, and is working on expanding to include other outdoor sports such as shooting and archery.
- The U.S. Army Parachute Team, also known as the "Golden Knights," located at Fort Bragg, North Carolina, is the Army's aerial demonstration team and one of only three United States Department of Defense-sanctioned aerial demonstration teams. Since its activation in 1959, the Team has conducted demonstrations of precision freefall and parachuting operations in all 50 U.S. States and 48 countries, earning it the title "Army's Goodwill Ambassadors to the World". The Team also competes in national and international skydiving and parachuting competitions, winning over 2,000 gold medals and setting nearly 350 world records.
- The U.S. Army Marksmanship Unit, located at Fort Benning, Georgia, is the Army's premier small arms marksmanship unit. Unit members are considered to be some of the best marksmen in the world and regularly compete at the Olympic Games and in national and international shooting competitions. Since its activation in 1956, Unit members have won 25 Olympic medals and over 65 individual and team championships. In addition, the Unit provides small arms research and development expertise to the Army, conducts marksmanship training to units throughout the United States Department of Defense and foreign nations, and performs exhibition shooting events around the nation.

=== U.S. Army Cadet Command ===
U.S. Army ROTC Cadet Command Shoulder Sleeve Insignia

The U.S. Army Cadet Command partners with universities to recruit, educate, develop, and inspire Senior ROTC Cadets in order to commission officers of character for the Total Army; and partners with high schools to conduct JROTC in order to develop citizens of character for a lifetime of commitment and service to the nation.

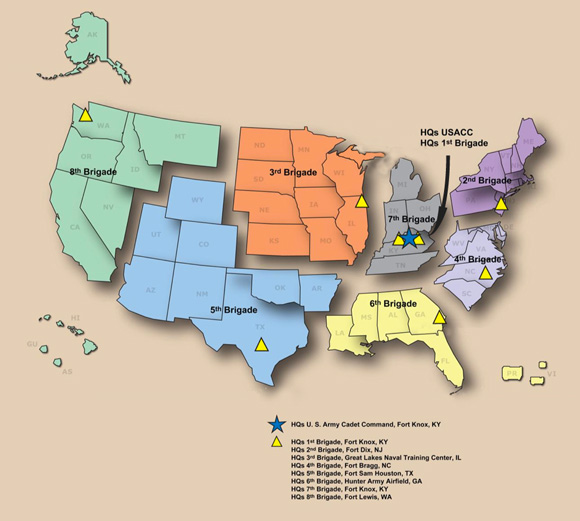
Map of the Army ROTC Brigades

ROTC is composed of seven brigades which command 273 ROTC units, referred to as battalions (though these units are typically much smaller than regular army battalions). The brigades command ROTC units throughout different regions of the country:

- 2nd Reserve Officers' Training Corps Brigade, Joint Base McGuire-Dix-Lakehurst, NJ (CT, MA, ME, NH, NJ, NY, PA, RI, VT, Germany, Italy)
- 3rd Reserve Officers' Training Corps Brigade, Great Lakes Naval Training Center, IL (IA, IL, KS, MN, MO, ND, NE, SD, WI)
- 4th Reserve Officers' Training Corps Brigade, Fort Bragg, NC (DC, DE, MD, NC, SC, VA, WV)
- 5th Reserve Officers' Training Corps Brigade, Joint Base San Antonio, TX (AR, AZ, CO, NM, OK, TX, UT, WY)
- 6th Reserve Officers' Training Corps Brigade, Hunter Army Airfield, GA (AL, FL, GA, LA, MS, PR, VI)
- 7th Reserve Officers' Training Corps Brigade, Fort Knox, KY (IN, KY, MI, OH, TN)
- 8th Reserve Officers' Training Corps Brigade, Joint Base Lewis-McChord, WA (AK, AS, CA, GU, HI, ID, MP, MT, NV, OR, WA, Korea, Japan)

== Recruiting and Retention College ==
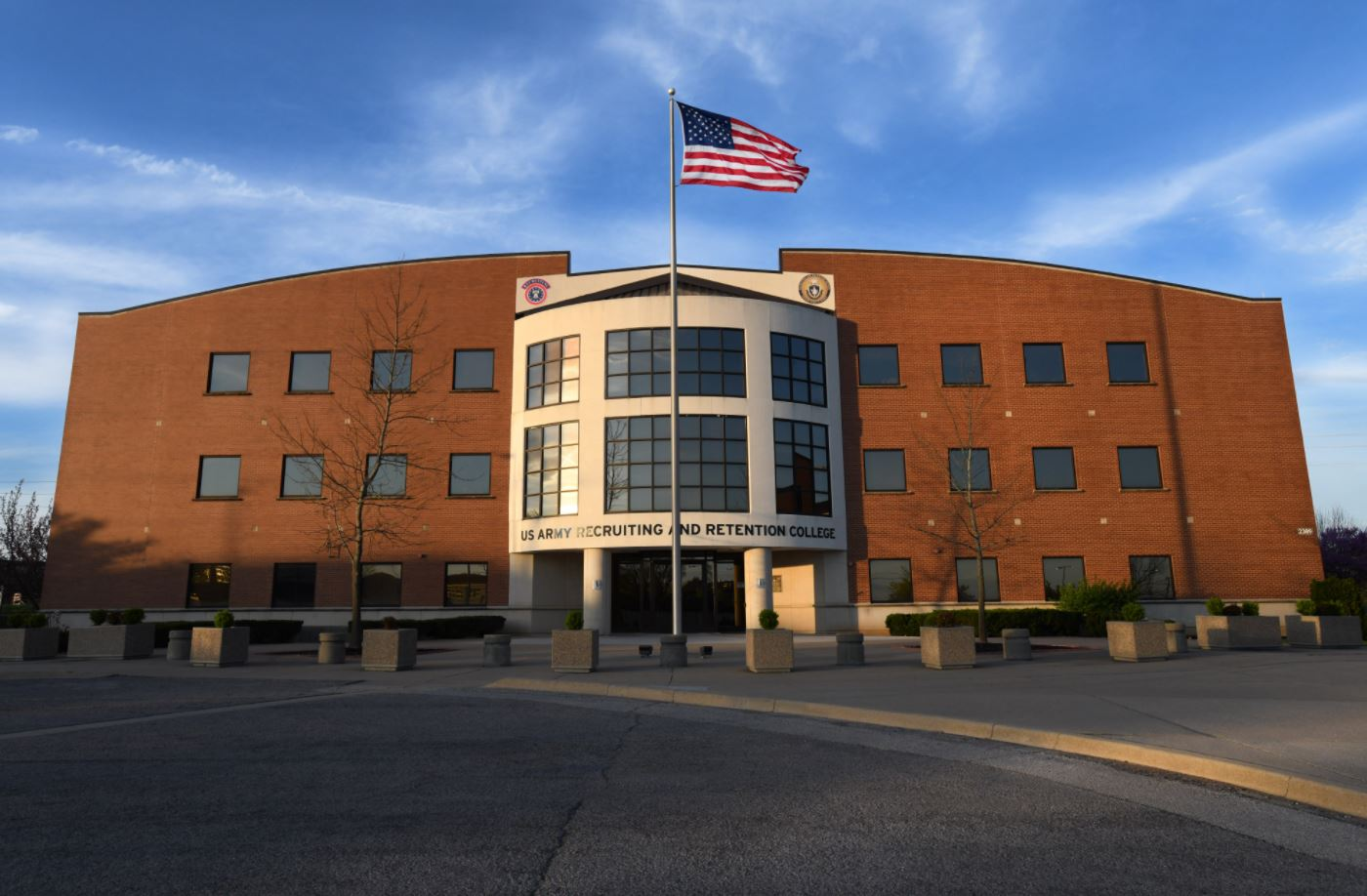
U.S. Army Recruiting and Retention College

The U.S. Army Recruiting and Retention College, located at Fort Knox, Kentucky, is responsible for the training and education of all Army and Army Reserve recruiters, career counselors, and recruiting leaders. (The Army National Guard manages its own recruiting and retention training program at the National Guard Professional Education Center at Camp Robinson, Arkansas.)

The college is part of the Army University system and is a satellite school under the operational command and control of the U.S. Army Soldier Support Institute at Fort Jackson, South Carolina. Its educational programs are accredited by the U.S. Army Training and Doctrine Command at Fort Eustis, Virginia, and the Council on Occupational Education in Atlanta, Georgia, which granted the college with an initial six-year civilian accreditation of its training and educational standards in March 2021 and placed it as one of only 45 COE-accredited federal training and education institutions. Courses taught at the college are also evaluated by the American Council on Education in Washington, D.C.to determine awarding of civilian college credits based on military education.

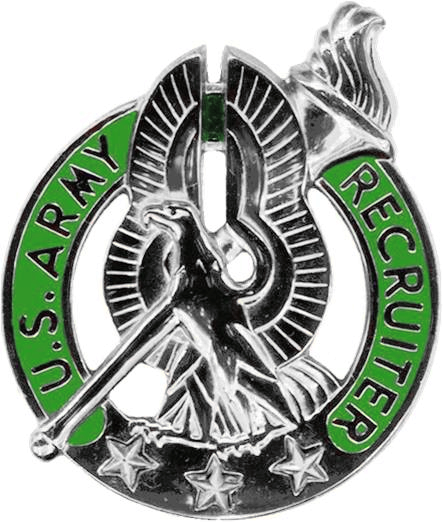
U.S. Army Recruiter Badge

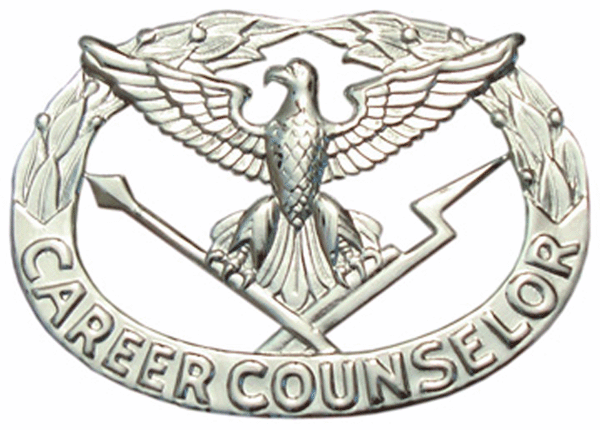
U.S. Army Career Counselor Badge

The college is commanded by a Colonel who serves as the institution's Commandant and is assisted by a Command Sergeant Major (who also serves as Commandant of the college's Noncommissioned Officer Academy), civilian Dean, a Headquarters Company, and support staff that manages and supports approximately 110 Soldiers and civilians, the majority of whom are senior cadre recruiters and career counselors that have been selected to serve for two to three years as instructors based on exceptional past performance in multiple recruiting or retention positions. Approximately 6,500 Soldiers and civilians each year are trained at the college, attending one of the 16 courses offered covering recruiting, career counseling, recruiting leadership, unit command, senior executive leadership, and staff positions. Students selected for duty as field recruiters or career counselors must first graduate from their respective certification course taught at the college in order to serve in those roles in the Army and be authorized to wear the Army Recruiter Badge or Army Career Counselor Badge as a permanent award on their uniform.

In addition to training the recruiting and retention force, the college provides training to new instructors and training managers for both USAREC and the Army, writes and publishes Army recruiting regulations and doctrine, creates and manages career progression plans for Army recruiters and career counselors, conducts recruiter training missions with foreign nations to share knowledge and best practices, and coordinates with civilian higher learning institutions and accrediting agencies for the awarding of civilian college credits and certifications to the college's graduates.

== Command ==
Current key command personnel of the Command include:

- Commanding General – LTG Johnny K. Davis
- Deputy Commanding General (Operations) – BG Eric Van Den Bosch
- Command Sergeant Major – CSM Joseph W. Wilson

== Commanders ==
- LTG Johnny K. Davis 2022 – Present
- MG Kevin Vereen 2020 – 2022
- MG Frank M. Muth 2018 – 2020
- MG Jeffrey J. Snow 2015 – 2018
- MG Allen W. Batschelet 2013 – 2015
- MG David L. Mann 2011 – 2013
- MG Donald M. Campbell Jr. 2009 – 2011
- MG Thomas P. Bostick 2005 – 2009
- MG Michael D. Rochelle 2002 – 2005
- MG Dennis D. Cavin 2000 – 2002
- MG Evan R. Gaddis 1998 – 2002
- MG Mark R. Hamilton 1997 – 1998
- MG Alfonso Lenhardt 1996 – 1997
- MG Kenneth W. Simpson 1993 – 1996
- MG Jack C. Wheeler 1989 – 1993
- MG Thomas P. Carney 1987 -1989
- MG Allen K. Ono 1985 – 1987
- MG Jack O. Bradshaw 1983 – 1985
- MG Howard G. Crowell Jr. 1981 – 1983
- MG Maxwell R. Thurman 1979 – 1981
- MG William L. Mundie 1978 – 1979
- MG Eugene Forrester 1975 – 1978
- MG William B. Fulton 1974 – 1975
- MG John Q. Henion 1971 – 1974
- BG Carter W. Clarke Jr. 1971
- MG Donald H. McGovern 1968 – 1971
- BG Frank L. Gunn 1966 – 1968
- BG Leonidas Gavalas 1964 – 1966

== See also ==
Comparable organizations

- Marine Corps Recruiting Command (U.S. Marine Corps)
- United States Navy Recruiting Command
- Air Education and Training Command (U.S. Air Force)

== Sources ==
- van Creveld, Martin, The Transformation of War, The Free Press, New York, 1991
- Vandergriff, Donald, Manning the Future Legions of the United States, Praeger Security International, London, 2008
- Gates, Thomas, S., The Report of the President's Commission on an All-Volunteer Armed Force, US Government Printing Office, Washington, DC, 1970
