= Northwoods battalion =

Battalion of Naval Training Center, Illinois

The Northwoods Battalion is an Army Reserve Officers' Training Corps battalion that was established in 1968 at the University of Wisconsin-Stevens Point. The battalion is a part of the 3rd Reserve Officers' Training Corps Brigade, the headquarters of which is based at the Great Lakes Naval Training Center, Illinois.

== History ==
The first officers were produced at UW-Stevens Point in 1970. Lieutenant Colonel Jack E. Mowery, started the ROTC program and was the first professor of Military Science. Women were not allowed to participate as cadets until 1974. UW-Stout partnered with UW-Stevens Point in 2005, and May 2007 commissioned its first officer. UWRF partnered with UWSP in 2007 and in May 2008 commissioned its first officer. UWEC started ROTC in the fall semester of 2009, but did not partner with the UW-Stevens Point until 2010.

== Success ==
Currently trains approximately 140 cadets, that once finish the requirements go to either a National Guard, Army Reserve, or Active Army unit. The Northwoods Battalion on average produces 19 lieutenants annually culminating with both winter and spring commissioning ceremonies. According to the University of Wisconsin-Stout's ROTC Northwoods Battalion website, being a part of the Army ROTC is known as being one of the best leadership courses in America.
