= Chip Forrester =

American political operative

Chair of the Tennessee Democratic Party
- In office January 24th, 2009 – January 23rd, 2013
- Preceded by: Gray Sasser
- Succeeded by: Roy Herron

Personal details
- Born: Eugene Priest Forrester, II; November 9, 1954 (age 71) Fort Benning, Georgia, U.S.
- Party: Democratic
- Children: 2
- Parent: Eugene Forrester (father)
- Education: University of Chicago (BA)

Chip Forrester (born November 9, 1954) is an American political operative, prolific Democratic fundraiser, and former chair of the Tennessee Democratic Party. He served on the Tennessee Democratic Party's executive committee from 1988 until 2009 when he was elected chairman. He is the son of United States Army Lieutenant General Eugene Forrester.

== Early life and education ==
Forrester was born in Fort Benning, Georgia. Due to his father's military service, Forrester and his family spent significant periods of time in Paris, France; London, England; and Manila, Philippines. He graduated from Choate Rosemary Hall in 1973.

Chip earned a bachelor's degree in Politics, Economics, Rhetoric & Law from the University of Chicago in 1977. His grandfather Percy Wagner, a prominent Chicago real estate developer and banker, also earned his bachelor's degree from the University of Chicago in 1916. By Chip's third year, he became the news editor of The Chicago Maroon. He later founded the Chicago Journal in 1974 and spent significant time covering South Side politician Harold Washington, who later became Chicago's first black mayor.

== Early career ==
After graduating from the University of Chicago, Forrester served as campaign advisor to Harold Washington's Chicago mayoral campaign. Upon Washington's inauguration, Forrester was appointed to be the assistant director of the City of Chicago's Department of Economic Development. Forrester later moved to Nashville, Tennessee and was the deputy campaign manager for Ned McWherter on his 1986 gubernatorial campaign.

In 1990, Forrester managed Al Gore's senatorial campaign. He later served as Gore's state director in the United States Senate.

== Tennessee Democratic Party ==
As chair, Forrester led the state party to the 2012 Democratic National Convention where he and actress Ashley Judd cast 91 votes for President Barack Obama during the ceremonial roll call. He was a pledged PLEO Delegate at the 2012 Convention.

He received news coverage after calling on representative Scott DesJarlais to resign.

== Later career ==
Forrester is a high-profile bundler for Democrats across the nation, including the presidential campaigns for Joe Biden in 2020, Hillary Clinton in 2016, and Barack Obama in 2012. Moreover, Forrester is a former co-chair of the National Advisory Board for the grassroots non-profit organization All On The Line - Tennessee.

In the 2015 Nashville mayoral election, Forrester served as senior adviser to real estate executive and mayoral candidate Bill Freeman on his campaign. Freeman was eliminated in the first round, after placing third behind Megan Barry and David Fox.

Chip is a member of the Democratic National Finance Committee and an early supporter of then vice president Joe Biden's 2020 presidential campaign. In 2019, Forrester and Bill Freeman raised hundreds of thousands of dollars at a Nashville fundraiser for Joe Biden prior to the South Carolina primaries.

He served as Tennessee state senator Heidi Campbell's treasurer during her 2022 campaign for Tennessee's 5th congressional district, following incumbent congressman Jim Cooper's retirement which was attributed to extreme gerrymandering in the 2020 United States redistricting cycle. As a result, Andy Ogles won the general election, the first time a Republican held the seat since 1875. Forrester asserted "When Ogles won the primary, he disappeared... He put no ads on TV, and he didn’t campaign at all. Probably from the perspective that he had an R+11 district: 'Now that you’re the nominee, keep your head down, because by talking, and people seeing you, they might realize how much of an idiot you are.' I’m glad to go on the record with that."

Chip served as national finance chair for Gloria Johnson in her 2024 United States Senate campaign against incumbent senator Marsha Blackburn. Forrester attended the October 25, 2023 White House State Dinner honoring Australia and visiting Prime Minister Anthony Albanese. Two months later, he attended a winter meeting of the Democratic National Finance Committee at The Waldorf Astoria in downtown Washington, DC.

In 2024, Forrester was selected as an at-large delegate to the 2024 Democratic National Convention in Chicago. In April 2024, Forrester was named one of four southern regional co-chairs of the Biden/Harris National Finance Committee. He was the only co-chair from Tennessee. In July, Forrester was repeatedly questioned about Biden's viability in the November presidential election. After attending the 2024 Joe Biden-Donald Trump presidential debate in Atlanta, Georgia and hearing from senior Biden campaign officials Jen O'Malley Dillon and Julie Rodriguez he made the following statement: "The bedwetters need to stop their moaning and get on board. This is the hand we have been dealt. We can beat Donald Trump, and I’m confident at the end of the day." Three weeks later, Forrester endorsed Vice President Kamala Harris. "I’m extremely pleased he has endorsed Kamala Harris and it would be awfully difficult to not strongly support her."

== Personal life ==
Forrester has two sons, Evan Forrester and Wilson Forrester. His son Wilson died in 2011, age 19, from an accidental overdose at the University of Arizona where he was a sophomore and a member of the Phi Gamma Delta fraternity. Forrester is quoted saying, "It is critically important to me that people, especially young people, understand the exact cause of Wilson's death."
