= Operation Patrick =

Part of the Vietnam War (1968)

- Part of the Vietnam War
Date	1–30 March 1968
Location	Bình Định Province, South Vietnam
Result	U.S. claims operational success

Belligerents
United States	North Vietnam

Commanders and leaders
Col. Eugene Forrester	

Units involved
3rd Brigade, 4th Infantry Division; 1st Battalion, 50th Infantry Regiment	3rd Division

Casualties and losses
	US body count: 70 killed

Operation Patrick was a security operation conducted during the Vietnam War by the U.S. 3rd Brigade, 4th Infantry Division in Bình Định Province, South Vietnam from 1 to 30 March 1968.

== Background ==
The 1st Battalion, 50th Infantry Regiment had been patrolling Bình Định Province since September 1967, supporting South Vietnamese and South Korean units. In early March, the 3rd Brigade, 4th Infantry Division commanded by Colonel Eugene Forrester was deployed to improve security in the coastal lowlands.

== Operation ==
On 9 March the People's Army of Vietnam (PAVN) 22nd Regiment, 3rd Division attacked the 1/50th Infantry's base camp, Landing Zone Litts (14.197°N 109.061°E), 2 kilometres (1.2 mi) north of Phù Mỹ District. The attackers failed to penetrate the perimeter and 36 were killed.

On 15 March during a patrol north of Phù Mỹ, the 1/50th Infantry engaged a force from the 22nd Regiment, killing a further 34 PAVN.

== Aftermath ==
The operation concluded on 30 March when the 3rd Brigade moved to the Central Highlands to rejoin the rest of the 4th Division. The 4th Battalion, 503rd Infantry Regiment began Operation Cochise Green continuing the mission of Operation Patrick.
