= Johnny K. Davis =

U.S. Army general officer

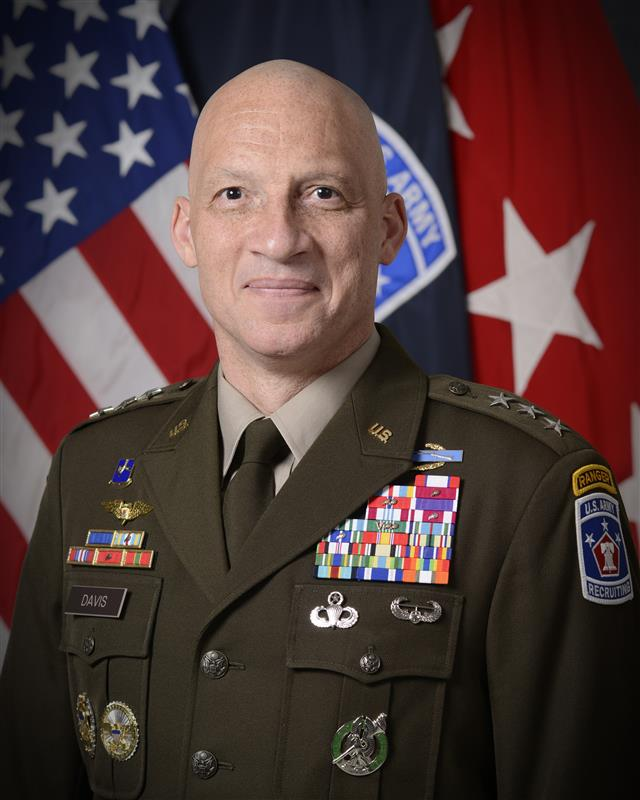
- Official portrait, 2025
- Education: New Mexico Military Institute; Cardinal Stritch University; National War College
- Military career
- Branch: United States Army
- Service years: 1989 to present
- Rank: Lieutenant general
- Commands: U.S. Army Recruiting Command; U.S. Army Cadet Command; Joint Modernization Command; 3rd Infantry Regiment; 1st Battalion, 502nd Infantry
- Conflicts: Operation Enduring Freedom; Operation New Dawn
- Awards: Distinguished Service Medal; Defense Superior Service Medal; Legion of Merit; Bronze Star; Purple Heart

Lieutenant General Johnny K. Davis is a United States Army three-star general. He is the commanding general of the United States Army Recruiting Command, and was confirmed by the U.S. Senate for promotion to lieutenant general in, December 2024. In this role, he oversees recruiting for both the active-duty and the reserve Army, with operations in the U.S., American Samoa, Guam, the Virgin Islands, Germany, and Asia.

== Early life and education ==
Davis is a Milwaukee, Wisconsin native. He attributes the example of his grandfather, who served in the military during World War II, as his inspiration for his own military service.

He attended New Mexico Military Institute in Roswell, New Mexico, where he participated in the ROTC Early Commissioning Program. He received his U.S. Army commission in 1989.

He later earned a Bachelor of Science degree from Cardinal Stritch University; and a master's degree from the National War College.

== Military career ==
In his early Army career, Davis served in a number of infantry leadership positions. His first assignment was to the 24th Infantry Division at Fort Stewart, Georgia. He served as a company commander and aide-de-camp with the 82nd Airborne Division at Fort Bragg, North Carolina after completion of the Maneuver Captains Career Course. His next assignment was as the commander of Delta Company, 3rd U.S. Infantry Regiment at Fort Myer, Virginia; followed by study at the Command and General Staff College.

Davis next assignment was to the 101st Airborne Division at Fort Campbell, Kentucky, as a battalion and brigade operations officer and brigade executive officer, followed by an assignment as the aide to the Vice Chairman of the Joint Chiefs of Staff and joint staff J8 staff officer.

Davis next command was the 1st Battalion, 502nd Infantry Regiment at Fort Campbell. He was a Task Force commander for their deployment to Afghanistan from 2010-2011 in Operation Enduring Freedom. Next, he deployed to Iraq in Operation New Dawn.

Following his deployment, Davis served as aide to the Vice Chief of Staff of the United States Army. Davis attended the National War College at Fort McNair, Washington, D.C., before serving as the director of the Army Wounded Warrior Program.

In June 2014, Davis assumed command of the 3rd Infantry Regiment at Fort Myer, Virginia. His next assignment was in Korea as the executive officer to the commanding general of U.S. Forces Korea. Following which, he served as Deputy Commanding General for Operations for the 25th Infantry Division at Schofield Barracks, Hawaii, until April 2018.

From June 2018 to June 2020, as a brigadier general, Davis served as the Commanding General of Joint Modernization Command at Fort Bliss, Texas. In March 2020, he became the Chief of Staff, U.S. Army Futures Command in Austin, Texas, where he served until March 2021.

From 2021 to 2022, Davis served as Commanding General, U.S. Army Cadet Command. In 2022, he assumed command of U.S. Army Recruiting Command.

On December 6, 2023, Davis and other command rank officers testified before the Senate Armed Services Subcommittee on Personnel regarding extensions of time for which a military rank could be held.

Promoted to lieutenant general on December 20, 2024, Davis was pinned with his third star by Chief of Staff of the Army General Randy George in a promotion ceremony at Fort Knox. Davis is serving as the first commanding general of the elevated U.S. Army Recruiting Command, responsible for all Army officer and enlisted recruitment and Army marketing.

In May 2025, the U.S. Army Garrison, Fort Knox, under the Davis' command received the 2025 Commander in Chief's Annual Award for Installation Excellence.

=== Awards ===
Davis' military decorations and awards include the Distinguished Service Medal, Defense Superior Service Medal, Legion of Merit, Bronze Star Medal, the Purple Heart, Meritorious Service Medal, Army Commendation Medal for Valor, Iraq Campaign Medal, Afghanistan Campaign Medal, Presidential Unit Citation, and Valorous Unit Award.
