= Operation Cochise Green =

Part of the Vietnam War (1968–1969)

- Part of the Vietnam War
Date	30 March 1968 – 31 January 1969
Location	Bình Định Province, South Vietnam
Result	US operational success

Belligerents
United States	North Vietnam; Viet Cong

Commanders and leaders
Richard J. Allen	

Units involved
173rd Airborne Brigade	3rd Division

Casualties and losses
114 killed	US body count: 929 killed 25 captured

Operation Cochise Green was a security and pacification operation during the Vietnam War conducted by the 173rd Airborne Brigade in Bình Định Province from 30 March 1968 to 31 January 1969.

== Background ==
Following the conclusion of Operation Patrick on 30 March 1968 when the 3rd Brigade, 4th Infantry Division, moved to the Central Highlands to rejoin its parent division. I Field Force, Vietnam commander General William R. Peers redeployed the 1st, 2nd, and 3rd Battalions of the 503rd Infantry Regiment, 173rd Airborne Brigade, as well as its headquarters from Kontum Province to the coastal plain. Now commanded by Brig. Gen. Richard J. Allen, who replaced General Leo H. Schweiter on 20 March, the brigade kicked off Operation Cochise in Bình Định to carry on the mission of Patrick.

== Operation ==
General Allen began Cochise by targeting a busy People’s Army of Vietnam (PAVN) supply route in the Vinh Thanh Mountains known as the "Oregon Trail". Intelligence suggested that the PAVN 3rd Division’s command post and elements of the 2nd and 22nd Regiments were in the area. Allen committed parts of the 2nd and 3rd Battalions, 503rd Infantry, plus an ARVN battalion and some Civilian Irregular Defense Group program (CIDG) soldiers, but the 3rd Division avoided contact for the entire twelve days of the operation and throughout the rest of April. Though the 173rd Airborne Brigade failed to locate its quarry, the sweep kept the PAVN out of the heavily populated Bồng Sơn and Phu My lowlands for six weeks.

The Allies considered two-thirds of the 350,000 people living in the Cochise area of operations to be heavily influenced by the Viet Cong (VC). With the 3rd PAVN Division making itself scarce, General Allen was able to focus much of the brigade's energy on attacking the local VC apparatus. Making the most use of long-range reconnaissance patrols to screen the approaches to the Bong Son Plain, Allen combined his battalions with ARVN forces to conduct frequent security sweeps in the northern lowlands. Like other U.S. commanders, Allen found it challenging to operate in populated areas where the enemy exercised a deep presence. One of the most serious problems was the steady stream of casualties inflicted on US soldiers by booby traps. During the summer, Allen's paratroopers discovered and disarmed 125 traps but inadvertently triggered an additional 300 that killed several men and left another 150 wounded. Whenever possible, troops followed armored vehicles whose weight detonated antipersonnel devices before the infantry reached them. Antitank mines not discovered by observation or electronic detectors were rarely powerful enough to damage tanks and did minimal harm to armored personnel carriers, but the force of the blast could injure those inside a carrier, and for this reason many soldiers rode atop, rather than inside, M113s. Allen recorded that "booby traps were very bad psychologically for our young paratroopers and commanders, in that the men develop a sometimes bitter hatred for the local villagers. The men have every reason to believe, and are sometimes correct in this belief, that the booby traps are made by the very people they see living in the villages."

On 22 August, Generals Nguyễn Văn Hiếu and Allen launched Operation Dan Sinh 22-6, a three-phased pacification-support operation by six battalions (three US and three ARVN) to clear the Bồng Sơn Plain. The operation differed from the brigade's previous activities in that Allen kept allied units in a particular village for a week or two before relocating them to another area, thus allowing sufficient time for an in-depth search. Otherwise, the techniques he used were indistinguishable from those used by all US units in Vietnam for years. Phase I lasted until 6 September and consisted of search-and-clear operations across the entire plain. Aided by the extensive use of Rome plows, the allies uncovered and destroyed numerous tunnels, caves, fortifications, and traps. Phase II lasted from 7 September to 27 October, during which time the Allies used cordon-and-search actions to screen the population. For small communities, the brigade would send a rifle company to establish a cordon either at dusk or at dawn. The screening of inhabitants became more productive once Vietnamese authorities assigned a company of National Police to assist in the interrogations. Popular Forces soldiers also helped with the search, while civic action personnel addressed local needs and VC defectors organized into armed propaganda teams proselytized the residents. By the end of Phase II, the Allies had interrogated nearly 13,000 people, killed 237 VC, and detained 122 confirmed and 115 suspected VC personnel. They had also captured seventy-one weapons. During Phase III, which was to start 28 October with no definite end date, Allen intended to saturate the Bồng Sơn Plain with patrols to prevent the VC from returning, creating a fertile environment for pacification activities. Allied operations on the Bồng Sơn Plain helped the province as a whole improve in the hamlet evaluation standings to a point where by 31 September Allied officials considered over 71 percent of the province's population to be relatively secure.

== Aftermath ==
The operation concluded on 31 January 1969, US losses were 114 killed while PAVN/VC losses were 929 killed and 25 captured.
