= 5th Reserve Officers' Training Corps Brigade =

5th ROTC Brigade
- 5th ROTC Brigade shoulder insignia
- Active: Present
- Country: United States
- Allegiance: United States Army
- Branch: US Army Reserve
- Type: ROTC brigade
- Role: Officer training
- Size: Brigade
- Garrison/HQ: Fort Sam Houston, Texas

Commanders
- Commander: COL Timothy W. Decker
- Command Sergeant Major: CSM Jacob Gilmer

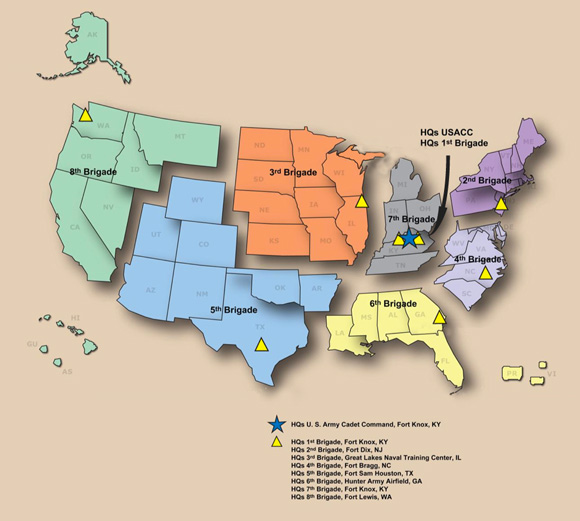
Map of Army ROTC brigades

The 5th Reserve Officers' Training Corps Brigade is an Army Reserve Officers' Training Corps brigade based at Fort Sam Houston, Texas.

== Battalions ==
=== Arizona ===
- Arizona State University
- Embry–Riddle Aeronautical University, Prescott
- Northern Arizona University
- University of Arizona

=== Arkansas ===
- Arkansas State University
- University of Arkansas
- University of Arkansas at Pine Bluff
- University of Central Arkansas

=== Colorado ===
- Colorado State University
- University of Colorado at Boulder
- University of Colorado at Colorado Springs

=== New Mexico ===
- New Mexico State University
- University of New Mexico

=== Oklahoma ===
- Cameron University
- Northeastern State University
- Oklahoma State University
- University of Central Oklahoma
- University of Oklahoma

=== Texas ===
- Baylor University
- Prairie View A&M University
- Saint Mary's University
- Sam Houston State University
- Stephen F. Austin State University
- Tarleton State University
- Texas A&M University-Corpus Christi
- Texas A&M University-Kingsville
- Texas Christian University
- Texas State University
- Texas Tech University
- University of Houston
- The University of Texas at Arlington
- The University of Texas at Austin
- University of Texas at El Paso
- University of Texas at San Antonio
- University of Texas - Pan American

=== Utah ===
- Brigham Young University
- Southern Utah University
- University of Utah
- Utah State University
- Utah Tech University
- Utah Valley University
- Weber State University

=== Wyoming ===
- University of Wyoming
