= 6th Reserve Officers' Training Corps Brigade =

United States Army Reserve unit

6th ROTC Brigade
- 6th ROTC Brigade Shoulder Insignia
- Active: Present
- Country: United States of America
- Allegiance: United States Army
- Branch: US Army Reserve
- Type: ROTC Brigade
- Role: Officer Training
- Size: Brigade
- Garrison/HQ: Hunter Army Airfield, Georgia

Commanders
- Commander: COL Jason Dumser
- Command Sergeant Major: CSM Joshua D. Dummond

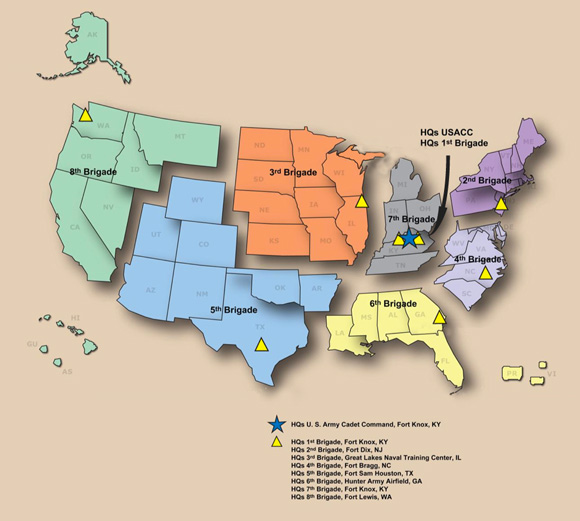
Map of the Army ROTC Brigades

The 6th Reserve Officers' Training Corps Brigade is an Army Reserve Officers' Training Corps brigade based at Hunter Army Airfield, Georgia. It provides training support and oversight to all Army ROTC and Junior ROTC units in the states of Alabama, Georgia, Florida, Louisiana, Mississippi, and Puerto Rico.

== Organization ==
The brigade comprises several ROTC battalions throughout the listed states. However, each ROTC unit is generally smaller than a battalion, as each contains around 100 cadets on average. The brigade commands 43 such battalions located at universities throughout the south. Additionally, the brigade commands 214 Junior Reserve Officer Training Corps programs throughout the five states and Puerto Rico. JROTC "battalions" are usually larger than their Senior ROTC counterparts, on average comprising over 150 cadets each.

== Battalions ==
=== Alabama ===
- Alabama A&M University
- Auburn University
- Auburn University at Montgomery
- Jacksonville State University
- The University of Alabama
- Tuskegee University
- University of Alabama at Birmingham
- University of North Alabama
- University of South Alabama

=== Florida ===
- Embry-Riddle Aeronautical University
- Florida Agricultural and Mechanical University
- Florida Atlantic University
- Florida Institute of Technology
- Florida International University
- Florida Southern College
- Florida State University
- University of Central Florida
- University of Florida
- University of South Florida
- University of Tampa
- University of West Florida

=== Georgia ===
- Augusta State University
- Columbus State University
- Fort Valley State University
- Georgia Institute of Technology
- Georgia Southern University
- Georgia State University
- University of Georgia

=== Louisiana ===
- Grambling State University
- Louisiana State University
- Northwestern State University
- Southern University and A&M College
- Tulane University

=== Mississippi ===
- Alcorn State University
- Jackson State University
- Mississippi State University
- University of Mississippi
- University of Southern Mississippi

=== Puerto Rico ===
- University of Puerto Rico - Mayaguez
- University of Puerto Rico - Rio Piedras
