= 7th Reserve Officers' Training Corps Brigade =

7th ROTC Brigade
- 7th ROTC Brigade Shoulder Insignia
- Active: Present
- Country: United States of America
- Allegiance: United States Army
- Branch: United States Army Reserve
- Type: ROTC Brigade
- Role: Officer Training
- Size: Brigade
- Garrison/HQ: Fort Knox, Kentucky
- Nickname: "Bold Warrior" Brigade

Commanders
- Commander: COL Sherman C. Watson
- Command Sergeant Major: CSM Eric D. Hayes

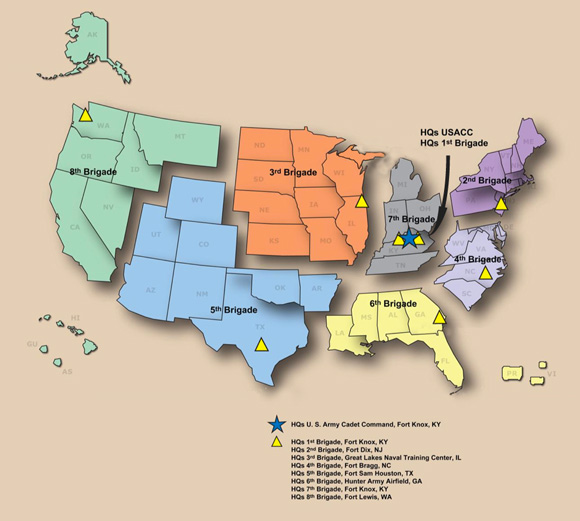
Map of the Army ROTC Brigades

The 7th Reserve Officers' Training Corps Brigade is an Army Reserve Officers' Training Corps brigade based in Fort Knox, Kentucky. It provides training support and oversight to all Army ROTC and Junior ROTC units in the states of Ohio, Indiana, Kentucky, Michigan, and Tennessee.

== Organization ==
The brigade comprises several ROTC battalions throughout these states. However, each ROTC unit is generally smaller than a battalion, as each contains around 100 cadets on average. The brigade commands 13 such battalions located at universities throughout Ohio, and five more throughout Kentucky. Additionally, the brigade commands 214 Junior Reserve Officer Training Corps programs throughout the five states. These "battalions" are usually larger, on average comprising over 150 cadets each.

== Battalions ==
=== Kentucky ===
- Cumberland College
- Eastern Kentucky University
- Northern Kentucky University
- Thomas More College
- Union College
- University of Kentucky
- University of Louisville
- University of Pikeville
- Western Kentucky University
- Murray State University
- Morehead State University

=== Indiana ===
- Ball State University
- University of Notre Dame
- Indiana University
- Indiana University Purdue University Indianapolis
- Purdue University
- Indiana Wesleyan University
- Rose–Hulman Institute of Technology

=== Michigan ===
- Central Michigan University
- Eastern Michigan University
- Michigan State University
- University of Michigan
- Western Michigan University
- Ferris State University
- Northern Michigan University
- Michigan Technological University

=== Ohio ===
- Baldwin-Wallace College
- Bowling Green State University
- Capital University
- Case Western Reserve University
- Cedarville University
- Central State University
- Cleveland State University
- College of Mount St. Joseph
- Columbus College of Art and Design
- Columbus State Community College
- DeVry University
- Denison University
- Franklin University
- Heidelberg College
- John Carroll University
- Kent State University
- Kenyon College
- Lourdes College
- Miami University
- Mount Union College
- Muskingum College
- Notre Dame College
- Oberlin College
- Ohio Dominican University
- Ohio Northern University
- The Ohio State University
- Ohio University
- Ohio Wesleyan University
- Otterbein College
- Tiffin University
- University of Akron
- University of Cincinnati
- University of Dayton
- University of Findlay
- University of Toledo
- Ursuline College
- Walsh University
- Wilberforce University
- Wittenberg University
- Wright State University
- Xavier University
- Youngstown State University
