= Army Reserve Officers' Training Corps =

U.S. Army ROTC
- U.S. Army ROTC Cadet Command Shoulder Sleeve Insignia
- Active: 1916–present
- Country: United States
- Branch: United States Army
- Role: Officer Training
- Part of: United States Army Recruiting Command
- Garrison/HQ: Fort Knox, Kentucky
- Motto: "Leadership Excellence"
- Website: ROTC Website

Commanders
- Commanding General: BG Dale S. Crockett
- Deputy Commanding General: BG Vacant
- Command Sergeant Major: CSM Darrell E. Walls

Insignia
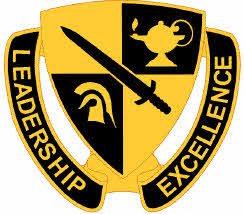
- Distinctive unit insignia

The Army Reserve Officer Training Corps (AROTC) is the United States Army component of the Reserve Officers' Training Corps. It is the largest Reserve Officer Training Corps (ROTC) program which is a group of college and university-based officer training programs for training commissioned officers for the United States Army and its reserves components: the Army Reserves and the Army National Guard. There are over 30,000 Army ROTC cadets enrolled in 274 ROTC programs at colleges and universities throughout the United States. These schools are categorized as Military Colleges (MC), Military Junior Colleges (MJC) and Civilian Colleges (CC).

All of these units are commanded by the U.S. Army Cadet Command, whose mission is "to select, educate, train, and commission college students to be officers and leaders of character in the Total Army and form partnerships with high schools to conduct JROTC programs to develop citizens of character for a lifetime of commitment and service to the nation."

The first college to offer military training was Norwich University, founded in 1819 in Vermont, followed by various state-chartered military schools and finally post-Civil War civilian land grant colleges that required military training. The modern Army Reserve Officers' Training Corps was created by the National Defense Act of 1916 and commissioned its first class of lieutenants in 1920.

== ROTC progression ==
For a cadet who only completes the first two years of ROTC (Basic Course), there is no military obligation, unless the student is a 3- to 4-year scholarship cadet or has other specific scholarships. If a cadet has accepted a scholarship, service commitments may vary. With some exceptions, in order to progress to the last two years of the program (Advanced Course) the cadet must contract with the United States Army. To do so, the student enlists in the United States Army Reserve Control Group (ROTC) as a cadet and elects to serve on either active duty or in a reserve component (Army National Guard or Army Reserve).

== Course of instruction ==
The following is an outline of a general military science program.

=== Basic Course ===
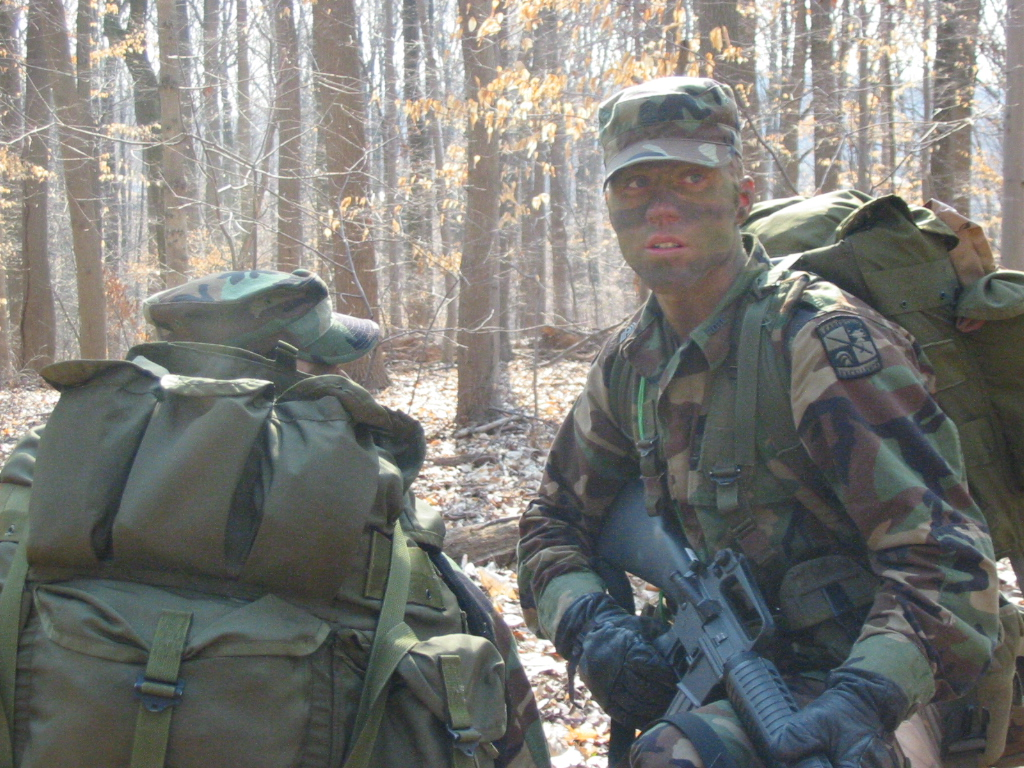
Army ROTC cadets on a field training exercise

Basic course qualification requirements

A candidate for freshman and sophomore level ROTC training must:

- Be of good moral character
- Be a citizen of the United States
- Be under 35 years of age by December 31 of the year of your graduation
- Be physically able to participate in the program of instruction
- Meet other entrance requirements as determined by the departmental chair, current army regulations and university policies

A student who does not meet all of the above requirements should consult with the Department of Military Science and Leadership to determine if waivers can be granted.

Military Science I year (MSI)

This year serves as the cadets' first introduction to the Army. Topics covered include military courtesy, military history, basic first aid, basic rifle marksmanship, basic hand grenade use, land navigation, rappelling, fundamentals of leadership, map orienteering, field training, military procedures, radio operations, rank structures and drill and ceremony.

Military Science II year (MSII)

The second year is an expansion of the topics taught in the first year of the program. Cadets are introduced to tactics, troop leading procedures, basics of operations orders and ethics.

Basic Camp

Basic Camp, formerly Cadet Initial Entry Training (CIET) and Leader's Training Course (LTC) before that, is a four-week (28-day) introduction to Army life and leadership training of the ROTC, held at Fort Knox, Kentucky each summer. The aim of this training is to motivate and qualify cadets for entry into the Senior ROTC program. Basic Camp is a summary version of the first two years of leadership development training that cadets receive at their university for the basic course. This course is designed for college students, either in the summer between freshman and sophomore year or between sophomore and junior year, qualifying these cadets for enrollment in the Military Science III year and Advanced Course.

=== Advanced Course ===
Military Science III year (MSIII)

The third year marks the beginning of the Advanced Course. This is where most cadets must contract with the Army to continue in the program. Cadets may be eligible for the Advanced Course if the following criteria are met:

- The cadet has prior military service or
- The cadet has completed the first two years of the program (Basic Course) or
- The cadet has graduated the Leaders Training Course (formerly Basic Camp) at Ft. Knox, Kentucky and
- The cadet has completed 54 credits (at least 60 preferred) of college coursework

The course sequence in this year is mainly focused on the application of leadership and small-unit tactics. Cadets are assigned rotating leadership positions within the School Battalion and are evaluated on their performance and leadership abilities while in those positions. Third-year cadets practice briefing operations orders, executing small-unit tactics, leading and participating in physical training and preparing for successful performance at the four-week Cadet Leader Course during the summer following the third year. Under current regulations, attendance at the course is mandatory (in the past, Ranger School was offered as an alternative to select cadets).

Leadership Development Program

During MSIII year and continuing through Advanced Camp, cadets are introduced to the Leadership Development Program (LDP). The LDP is a structured set of rotations where MSIII cadets are assigned to specific roles in an organization consisting of companies, platoons and squads. Some of the roles traditionally filled are that of a company commander, company XO, first sergeant, platoon leader, platoon sergeant and squad leader.

While filling these positions, the MSIII is evaluated according to the Army Leadership Requirements Model (ALRM) which centers on what a leader is (attributes) and what a leader does (competencies), outlined by the following model.

Attributes
Character	Presence	Intellect
Army values	Military and professional bearing	Mental agility
Empathy	Fitness	Sound judgment
Warrior ethos/Service ethos	Confidence	Innovation
Discipline	Resilience	Interpersonal tact
		Expertise
Leads	Develops	Achieves
Leads others	Creates a positive environment/Fosters esprit de corps	Gets results
Builds trust	Prepares self	
Extends influence beyond the chain of command	Develops others	
Leads by Example	Stewards the profession	
Communicates		
Competencies

The evaluation is usually given by an MS IV and is delivered in writing using a Developmental Counseling form, DA 4856. Cadets are counseled on their performance through the ALRM attributes and competencies. At the end of the MSIII school year, these counselings are collected and help determine a cadet's ranking on the Order of Merit List (OML), a ranking of all ROTC Cadets in the nation that impacts how Cadets receive their component and branch when they commission.

Advanced Camp

Advanced Camp is a paid 35 day leadership course conducted at Fort Knox, Kentucky each summer. It was formerly conducted at Fort Lewis, Washington, Fort Bragg, North Carolina and Fort Riley, Kansas. In 2014, Advanced Camp (then LDAC) was consolidated with Basic Camp at Fort Knox, Kentucky. This was a period of upheaval for the training event due to the rapid change of locations and new Cadet Command Commanding General stripping Advanced Camp of its graded portion. For 2014, Advanced Camp, then LDAC, retained its graded portions, but in 2015 it was changed to Cadet Leadership Camp (CLC). During the time it was called CLC, all the graded portions of were taken out and the 4 week period was pass/no pass. In 2016 a new commanding general took over Cadet Command, on his first day CLC became Advanced Camp and in 2017 the old style of graded events will be brought back. This includes a graded PT test, graded rifle qualification and graded training lanes. Typically, cadets attend Advanced Camp during the summer between their first and second years in the Advanced Course (junior and senior year of college). At Advanced Camp, cadets take on various leadership roles and are evaluated on their performance and leadership abilities in those positions. Cadets also participate in adventure training to include: confidence and obstacle courses, rappelling, water safety, weapons firing and patrolling. While at Advanced Camp, cadets take a series of standardized tests including the Cadet Development Assessment (CDA). The CDA assesses the state of a MSIII cadet's development in preparation for the MSIV year with a focus on mission-context problem solving. Cadets must attend and complete Advanced Camp to earn an Army commission.

Military Science IV year (MSIV)

This is the final year of the ROTC program and the main focus is towards preparing cadets to become successful lieutenants in the Army upon graduation and commissioning. Senior cadets apply for their branches (career fields). Senior cadets apply before end of their third year, but have until mid September to make any changes before they are locked in. In early November, cadets are notified of which branch and status they were granted (e.g., Regular Army, Army Reserve, Army National Guard). For those cadets selected for the reserve component (Army Reserve or Army National Guard), they are responsible for locating a unit with which to serve. Cadets selected for active duty (Regular Army) are notified of their first duty assignment in the spring semester, typically in early April. Throughout their senior year, MSIV cadets are assigned cadet battalion staff positions and are responsible for evaluating MS III cadets, planning and coordinating training operations and missions. The primary purpose of the MSIV year is to learn how to manage and evaluate training in the field while learning officership in the classroom.

=== Branch assignment ===
Branch assignments are made according to the needs of the Army. Consideration is given to the cadet's area of academic specialty and their individual desires. Army policy is to assign graduating cadets to a branch and specialty code based on the following:

- Army branch/specialty strength requirements
- Academic disciplines
- Personal preference
- Recommendation of the Professor of Military Science
- Demonstrated performance and potential
- Prior military experience
- Other experience

=== Lab ===
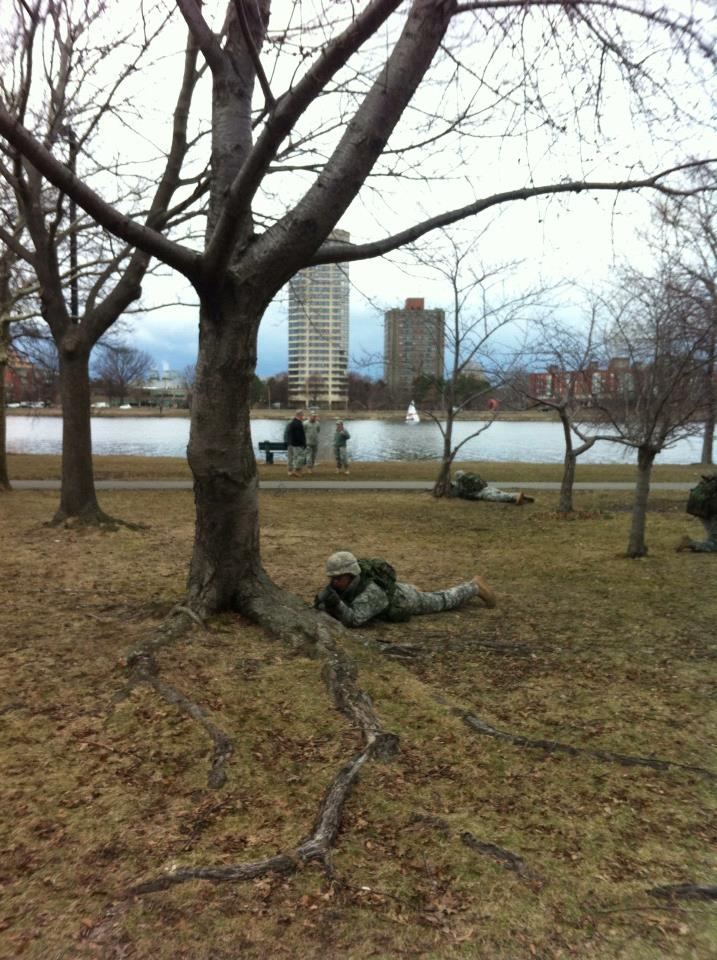
ROTC cadets on a small unit tactical operations training exercise in Boston, Massachusetts

Leadership labs place cadets in leadership positions, teach and provide practical experience in military drill and ceremonies, troop leading procedures, small unit tactical operations, rappelling and water survival. Labs are held during the week and run for approximately two hours.

=== Physical fitness training ===
Physical fitness training builds physical conditioning, teamwork, and self-confidence. Physical fitness training sessions are typically scheduled for approximately one-hour and the intensity, time and type of exercises varies. All ROTC Cadets must pass the Army Combat Fitness Test (ACFT) with at least the minimum (60 points) in each of the six exercises according to the standards for their age and sex. Each program may further make its own standards. For example, a program may set a standard of scoring no less than 70% (10% more than the Army requires) in each category. Failure to reach the program standard may require increased physical fitness training on otherwise days of rest (commonly known as "incentive” or “remedial” PT).

Physical fitness is also a graded component of the Order of Merit List in the branching process. Cadets with higher scores on the ACFT during their MSIII year and at Advanced Camp receive more points in this category, which places them higher on the OML and makes performing well in physical fitness necessary for Cadets to receive their preferred branch and component.

== College life ==
ROTC cadets must train for the military at the same time that they complete their college degree. This entails numerous commitments during and outside the school year. Cadets are typically (situation may vary in military colleges) mandated to wear military uniforms to college classes one day per week, take military science classes as one of their regular course requirements, attend physical fitness training during the week and participate in field training exercises on some weekends. The summers following Cadets' sophomore and junior years typically involve training courses at Fort Knox or other military installations, at a time when other students might typically pursue internships or research opportunities.

== Cadre ==
The cadre at each university consist of military personnel and civilian technical assistants who run the ROTC program. It is the cadre's job to teach the military science classes and oversee the day-to-day operations of the ROTC program. Every Army ROTC program has a professor of military science, usually a lieutenant colonel; it is his/her job to instruct the MSIVs as they make the transition from cadet to second lieutenant. Depending on the size of the program, there are typically other cadre members including an assistant professor of military science, usually a senior captain or a major who teaches younger cadets, and a senior military instructor, usually a senior NCO who teaches basic military skills and tactics.

== Scholarships ==
The United States Army offers ROTC scholarships that assist students with financing their education.

There are numerous types of Army ROTC scholarships available for both high school and college students.:

There are three different types of scholarships available to high school students. These scholarships are won through the national ROTC scholarship selection board which convenes on three different dates that vary slightly each school year.

- Four-year scholarships offered to candidates pay for full tuition for all four years of their undergraduate degree.
- Three-year advanced designee scholarships require students to enroll in a college ROTC program and be a full-time college student, for which the student's freshmen year will not be paid for by the Army. If the student displays academic competence and receives a recommendation by the program's Professor of Military Science, the remaining three years will be paid for in full.
- Two-year scholarships are known as Early Commissioning Program scholarships (ECP), or Ike Skelton scholarships. These scholarships enable a student to commission into the Army Reserves or the Army National Guard in two years instead of the usual four. Students are required to attend a Military Junior College (MJC) for two years and will commission after. As students will have an associates rather than the required bachelors for the Basic Officer Leaders Course (BOLC), students will have up to three years to earn their bachelors and are eligible for the Educational Assistance Program which can pay for up to two years of tuition. If students wish to go Active Duty on the ECP route, they will have to do so through their respective MJC.

ROTC scholarships for those already attending college will cover the remaining years of their college.

- The three-year scholarship is available for students who have three academic years of college remaining.
- The two-year scholarship is available for students who have two academic years of college remaining.

The Army ROTC scholarship entitles its recipients to full-tuition assistance, as well as a textbook/fee allowance and a monthly stipend to cover the student's living expenses. Typically, cadets receive tuition assistance. However, they also have the option to apply the scholarship to their 'room and board' expenses instead of school tuition.

The Simultaneous Membership Program (SMP) is an alternative route to receive military scholarship benefits. The program requires cadets to enlist in a reserve unit (Army Reserve or National Guard) while enrolled in ROTC. ECP cadets are required to enlist in the Army Reserves or the Army National Guard during their two years at a Military Junior College, and will be in the SMP program. SMP cadets are not required to complete Basic Combat Training (BCT) or Advanced Individual Training (AIT), but it is necessary to receive specific benefits. The benefits are as follows:

- Drill pay at E-5 or higher
- Cadet rank
- GI Bill
- Federal tuition assistance
- GI Bill Kicker (If qualified)
- National Guard members may be eligible for various state-offered benefits, including additional tuition assistance

Once contracted, SMP cadets cannot be deployed. However, they are required to attend all drill events with their unit. This includes drill weekend and advanced training.

== Training opportunities ==
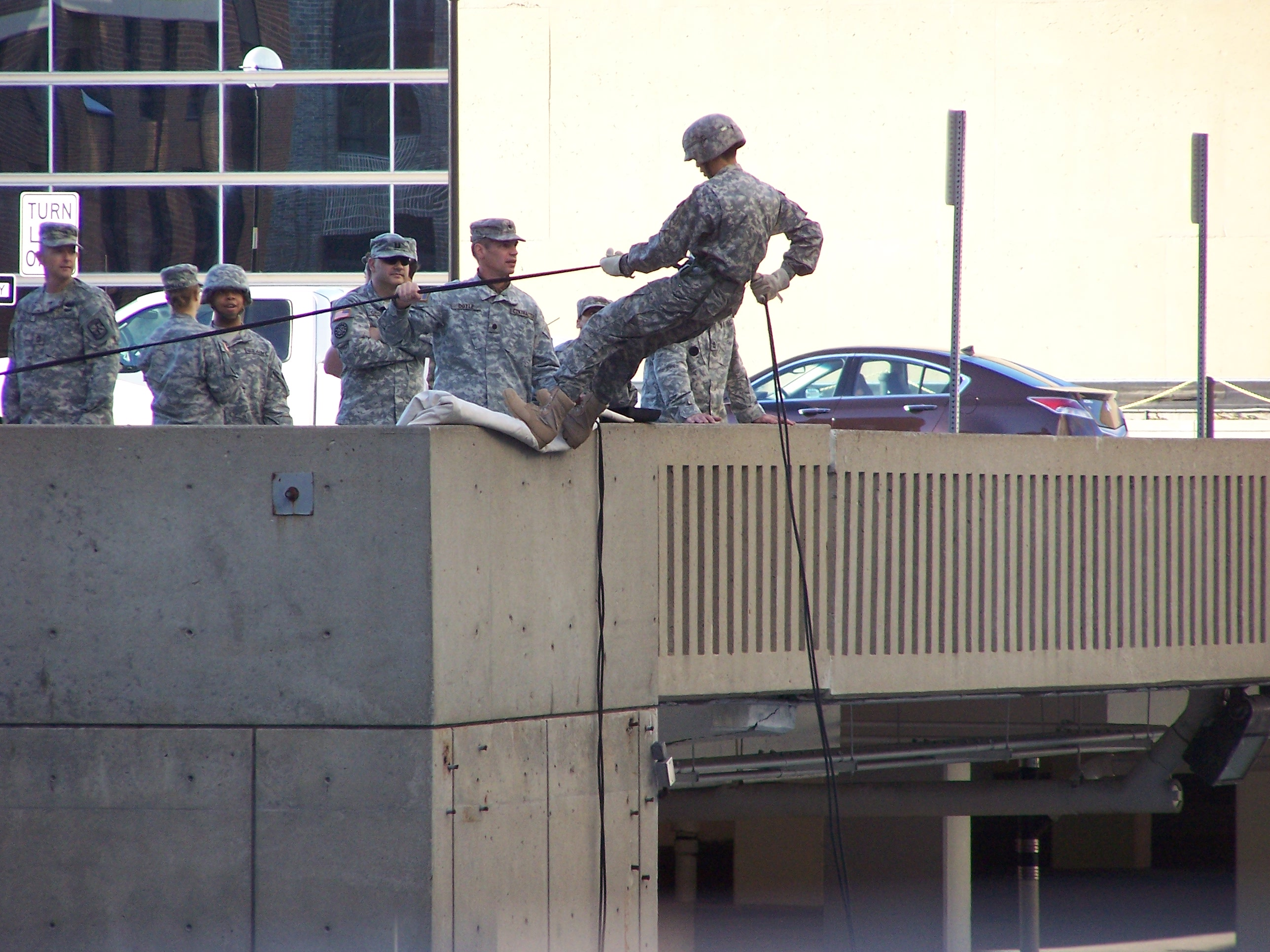
An Army ROTC unit practicing rappelling from a parking garage in September 2010

Cadets may compete for training opportunities conducted at active army schools. This training is usually conducted during the summer months, but some allocations are available during the winter holidays. Cadets are selected to attend this training based on their overall standing within the program. Since the number of allocations are limited, selection for schools is competitive and based on factors including ROTC grades, academic grades, participation in ROTC activities, APFT scores and advisor recommendations.

=== Air Assault School ===
Cadets are trained in airmobile operations, including rappelling from helicopters, airmobile tactics and rigging air mobile cargo. This is a two-week course taught at Fort Campbell, Kentucky. Upon successful completion, the cadet is awarded the Air Assault Badge.

=== Airborne School ===
Army airborne training is conducted for three weeks at Fort Benning, Georgia. Upon successful completion, cadets are awarded the Parachutist Badge.

=== The Cadet Intern Program ===
An initiative of ASA/MRA, allows cadets to work with a variety of programs across the nation, such as Department of the Army (DA), the Office of the Chief of the Army Reserve (OCAR), National Guard Bureau (NGB), Federal Bureau of Investigation (FBI), European Command (EUCOM), Africa Command (AFRICOM), or the Office of the Secretary of Defense (OSD) for 3–8 weeks.

=== Cadet Troop Leadership Training ===
Cadet Troop Leadership Training is an optional program for MSIII cadets during the summer following completion of LDAC. This three-week CONUS or four-week OCONUS program trains cadets in lieutenant positions with active army units. Assignments are available in nearly all branches and with units worldwide.

=== Drill Cadet Leadership Training ===
Drill Cadet Leadership Training is very similar to Cadet Troop Leadership training but it takes place at Fort Jackson, South Carolina. During the three weeks, cadets will follow around drill sergeants and the officers of each basic training company.

=== Northern Warfare Training Course ===
The Northern Warfare Training course is a three-week course covering tactical operations in a cold weather climate. The course is taught at Fort Greely in Alaska. Cadets are trained in winter survival techniques, skiing, snowshoeing and cold weather patrolling.

=== Mountain Warfare Training Course ===
The Army Mountain Warfare course is taught at the Ethan Allen Firing Range in Jericho, Vermont. It is taught in two phases, each lasting two weeks. The summer phase teaches and tests cadets on military mountaineering operations including rock climbing, rappelling and orienteering. The winter phase teaches and tests on similar tasks, but in the winter environment. It includes ice climbing, cross-country skiing and cold weather operations.

=== Sapper Leader Course ===
The Sapper Leader Course focuses on the application of a mixture of infantry and combat engineer small unit tactics to forces composed of one or more branch of service. Additionally, this course focuses on advancing the leadership skills of its students within these environments. The course is taught in two sections which each focus on different tasks. The first consists of general information including combat lifesaving, meeting physical fitness standards, demolitions, explosive hazard recognition, land navigation, knot tying, as well as air, mountain and water operations training. The second phase consists of tactics which relate specifically to patrolling and combat operations with topics covering movement formations, intelligence gathering, planning operations, MOUT, and a field training. The course as a whole lasts for 28 days. Phase one makes up the first thirteen days of training while phase two training takes up the remaining 15 days. Of these last 15 days, the field training exercise takes 9 to complete. To be accepted into the program, a prospective student must show proficiency in multiple areas of physical fitness, as well as knowledge of battle drills. To meet the minimum physical standards, a candidate must pass the APFT as well as the height and weight measures. Additionally, the results of the Combat Water Survival Test are required. All training is conducted on the U.S. Army installation of Ft. Leonard Wood, Missouri. On graduation, successful students will be awarded the sapper tab.

=== Robin Sage ===
For ROTC cadets, participation in the Robin Sage exercise is the opportunity to train in guerilla tactics with Special Forces candidates conducting the exercise. During the training, cadets act as a guerrilla force in Pineland, a fictional independent state which has been invaded, who are trained by special forces candidates. The training opportunity covers a variety of battle drills all focused around fieldcraft for small units. Some general items such as operations planning, medical procedures, troop movements and demolitions are among the more prominent skills taught in this environment. The exercise encompasses 20 days of training. For ROTC cadets, selection for training is dependent upon performance academically, and physically. The training is conducted in the civilian areas around Ft Bragg, North Carolina. During training, the 15 counties in central North Carolina are used to represent the independent state of Pineland. For ROTC candidates, no awards are received as this is part of a training exercise and not an independent school.

== Activities and clubs ==
=== Ranger Challenge ===
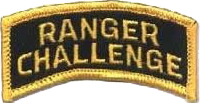
AROTC's Ranger Challenge Tab

Ranger Challenge is the varsity sport of Army ROTC. A Ranger Challenge team is made up of 9 people, 8 active participant and 1 reserved. They compete against other colleges throughout the nation in events such as patrolling, weapons assembly, one-rope bridge, Army Physical Fitness Test, land navigation and a ten-kilometer road march.

=== Color guard ===
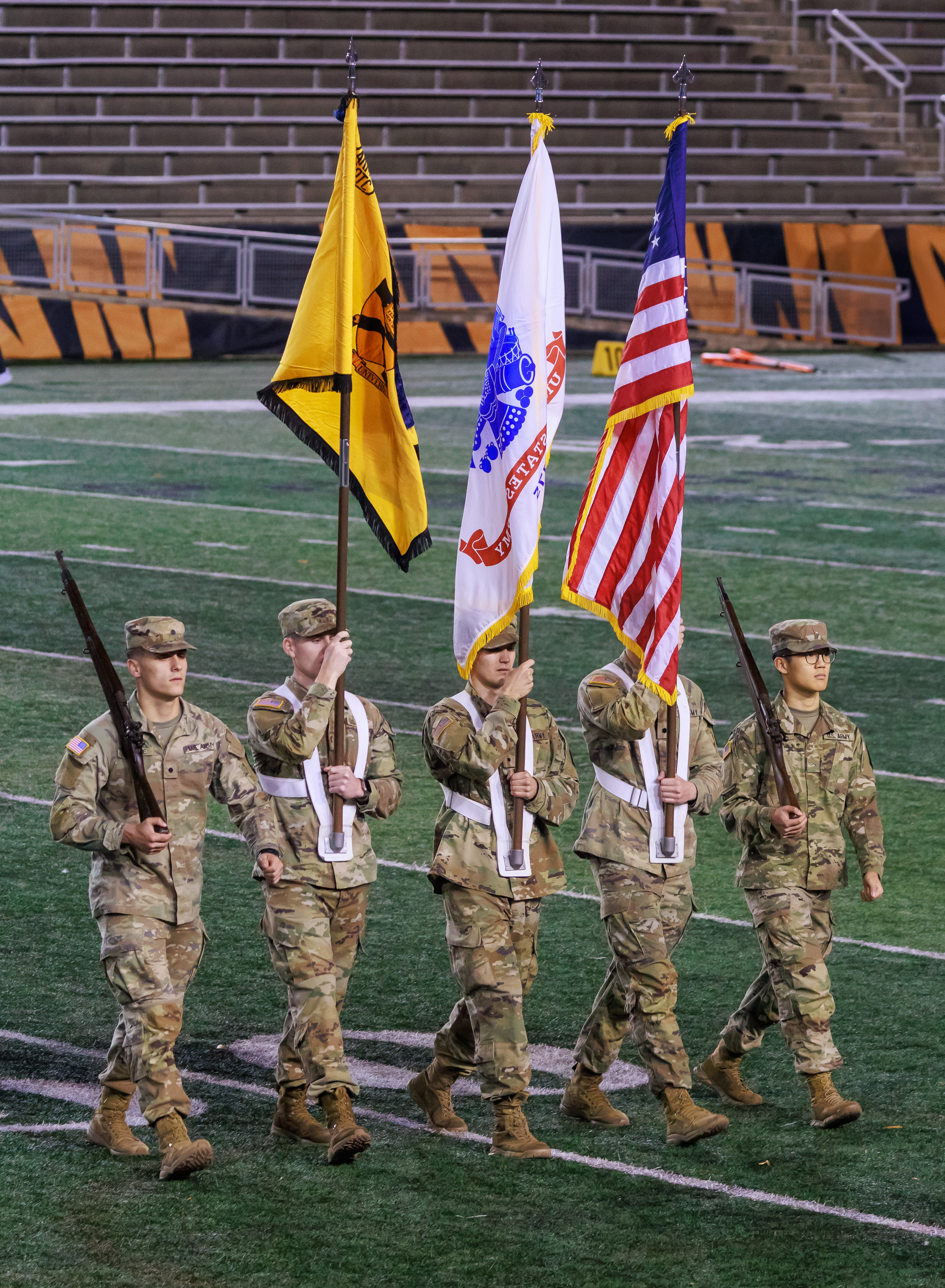
Princeton ROTC color guard at a football game

A color guard is responsible for posting the colors for ceremonial events (football games, dining ins and dining outs, military balls and commencements), as well as cannon detail at football games, in order to show honor towards flag and country.

=== Military ball ===
These formal social events are designed to allow cadets to experience the type of social gathering and military etiquette they can expect as future commissioned officers. Cadets are encouraged to bring spouses or dates. Many dignitaries are invited, including the school president, certain university officials and representatives of veterans' societies, parents and relatives.

== Organization ==
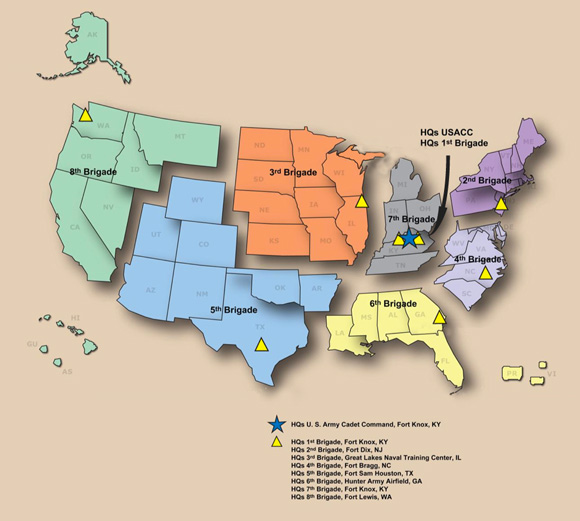
Map of the Army ROTC Brigades

ROTC is composed of seven brigades which command 273 ROTC units, referred to as battalions (though these units are typically much smaller than regular army battalions). The brigades command ROTC units throughout different regions of the country:

- 2nd Reserve Officers' Training Corps Brigade, Joint Base McGuire-Dix-Lakehurst, NJ (CT, MA, ME, NH, NJ, NY, PA, RI, VT, Germany, Italy)
- 3rd Reserve Officers' Training Corps Brigade, Great Lakes Naval Training Center, IL (IA, IL, KS, MN, MO, ND, NE, SD, WI)
- 4th Reserve Officers' Training Corps Brigade, Fort Bragg, NC (DC, DE, MD, NC, SC, VA, WV)
- 5th Reserve Officers' Training Corps Brigade, Joint Base San Antonio, TX (AR, AZ, CO, NM, OK, TX, UT, WY)
- 6th Reserve Officers' Training Corps Brigade, Hunter Army Airfield, GA (AL, FL, GA, LA, MS, PR, VI)
- 7th Reserve Officers' Training Corps Brigade, Fort Knox, KY (IN, KY, MI, OH, TN)
- 8th Reserve Officers' Training Corps Brigade, Joint Base Lewis-McChord, WA (AK, AS, CA, GU, HI, ID, MP, MT, NV, OR, WA, Korea, Japan)

The army deactivated the 1st "Spartan" Brigade on June 26, 2026, leaving the development of ROTC cadets at USACC's six Senior Military Colleges and four Military Junior Colleges to the other seven brigades.

== List of commanding generals ==
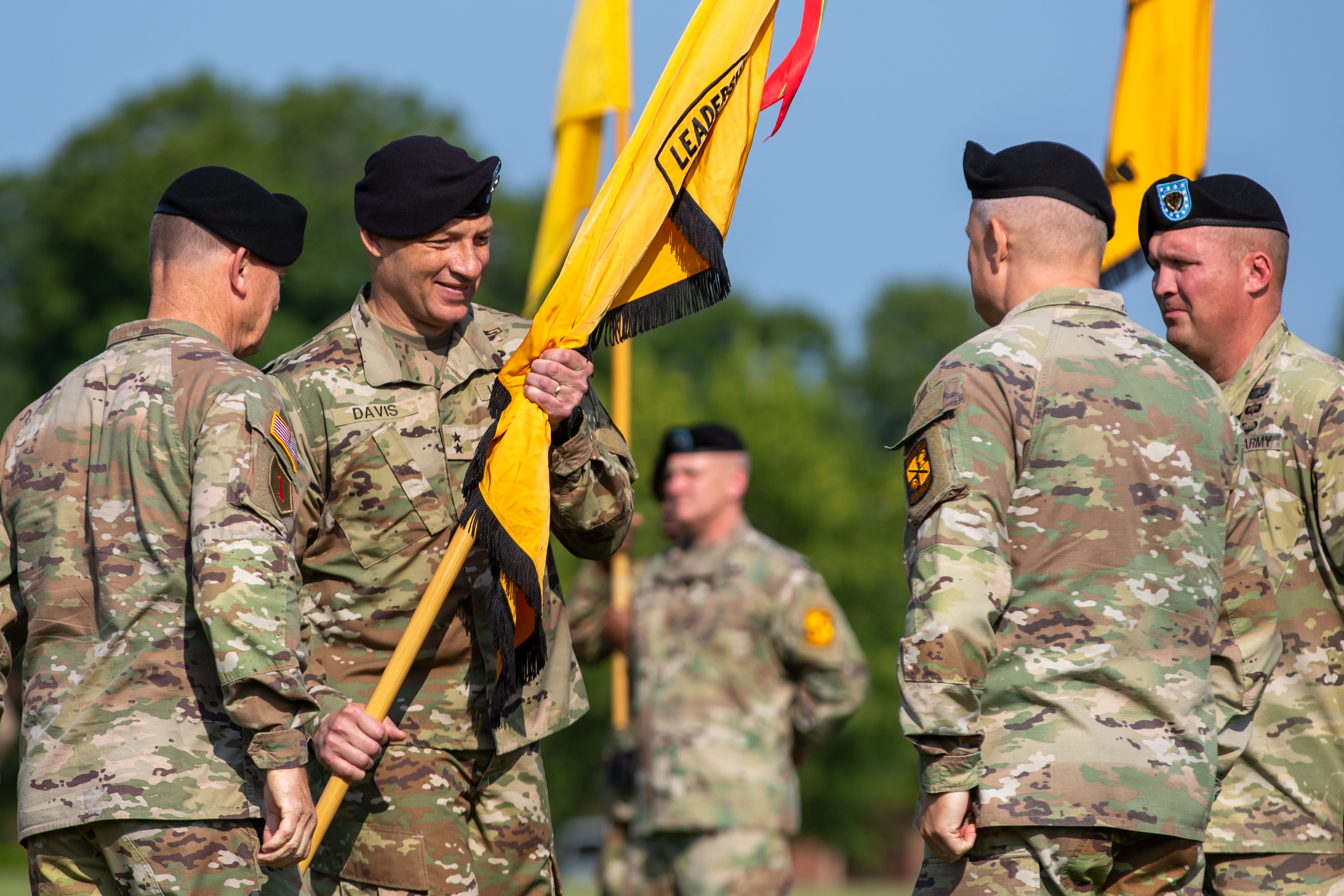
Maj. Gen. Johnny K. Davis assumes command of the Army Cadet Command from Maj. Gen. John R. Evans Jr. on August 3, 2021.

The commander of the Reserve Officers' Training Corps is dual-hatted as the commanding general of U.S. Army Cadet Command since 2011.

No.	Commanding General		Term		
No.	Portrait	Name	Took office	Left office	Duration
1	John P. Prillaman	Major General; John P. Prillaman	March 14, 1983	April 15, 1986	3 years, 32 days
2	Robert E. Wagner	Major General; Robert E. Wagner	April 15, 1986	April 24, 1990	4 years, 9 days
3	Wallace C. Arnold	Major General; Wallace C. Arnold	April 24, 1990	June 17, 1993	3 years, 54 days
4	James M. Lyle	Major General; James M. Lyle	June 17, 1993	August 1996	~3 years, 45 days
5	Stewart W. Wallace	Major General; Stewart W. Wallace	August 1996	September 10, 2000	~4 years, 40 days
6	John T.D. Casey	Major General; John T.D. Casey	September 10, 2000	July 2003	~2 years, 294 days
7	Alan W. Thrasher	Major General; Alan W. Thrasher	July 2003	July 2005	~2 years, 0 days
8	W. Montague Winfield	Major General; W. Montague Winfield	July 2005	November 2008	~3 years, 123 days
9	Arthur M. Bartell	Major General; Arthur M. Bartell	November 2008	September 2010	~1 year, 304 days
-	Barrye L. Price	Colonel; Barrye L. Price; Acting	September 2010	November 22, 2010	~82 days
10	James M. McDonald	Major General; James M. McDonald	November 22, 2010	April 6, 2012	1 year, 136 days
11	Jefforey A. Smith	Major General; Jefforey A. Smith	April 6, 2012	March 10, 2014	1 year, 338 days
12	Peggy C. Combs	Major General; Peggy C. Combs	March 10, 2014	May 25, 2016	2 years, 76 days
13	Christopher P. Hughes	Major General; Christopher P. Hughes	May 25, 2016	May 18, 2018	1 year, 358 days
14	John R. Evans Jr.	Major General; John R. Evans Jr.	May 18, 2018	August 3, 2021	3 years, 77 days
15	Johnny K. Davis	Major General; Johnny K. Davis	August 3, 2021	September 20, 2022	1 year, 48 days
16	Antonio V. Munera	Major General; Antonio V. Munera	September 20, 2022	August 7, 2024	1 year, 322 days
17	Maurice O. Barnett	Brigadier General; Maurice O. Barnett	August 7, 2024	March 12, 2026	1 year, 217 days
18	Dale S. Crockett	Brigadier General; Dale S. Crockett	March 12, 2026	Incumbent	219 days

== Notable graduates ==
In 1960, General George H. Decker became the first ROTC graduate named Chief of Staff of the Army. General Colin Powell was the first ROTC graduate named Chairman of the Joint Chiefs of Staff, who was a graduate of the City College of New York and later served as the United States secretary of state.

Chiefs of staff of the Army or chairmen of the Joint Chiefs of Staff to graduate from Army ROTC include:

- Chiefs of Staff of the Army
  - General George H. Decker (Lafayette College)
  - General Fred Weyand (University of California, Berkeley)
  - General Gordon R. Sullivan (Norwich University)
  - General Peter Schoomaker (University of Wyoming)
  - General George Casey (Georgetown University)
  - General Mark Milley (Princeton University)
- Chairmen of the Joint Chiefs of Staff
  - General Dan Caine (Virginia Military Institute)
  - General Colin Powell (City College of New York)
  - General Hugh Shelton (North Carolina State University)
  - General Mark Milley (Princeton University)
- Other notable graduates
  - Charlie Beckwith (University of Georgia)
  - Patrick Murphy (King's College)
  - Lou Holtz (Kent State)
  - Sam Walton (University of Missouri)
  - Earl Graves (Morgan State University)
  - James Earl Jones (University of Michigan)
  - Samuel Alito (Princeton)
  - Frank Wells (Pomona College)
  - Dean Rusk (Davidson College)
  - Nancy Currie (Ohio State)
  - Leon Panetta (Santa Clara University)
  - Darrell Issa (Kent State)
  - Ernest Frederick "Fritz" Hollings (The Citadel)
  - Robert L. Stewart (The University of Southern Mississippi)
  - James Earl Rudder (Texas A&M University)

The Citadel has produced 293 general and flag officers as of June 30, 2017. VMI had produced 265 as of 2006. The University of Oregon has produced the highest number of general officers out of the civilian ROTC schools, with a total of 47.

== Awards ==
The ROTC Medal for Heroism

There are three Department of the Army decorations authorized exclusively to cadets:

- ROTC Medal for Heroism
- Superior Cadet Decoration Award
- Ranger Challenge Tab

Outside these, cadets are eligible for numerous U.S. Army awards and decorations, as well as awards and decorations sponsored by various military societies and organizations.

=== Distinguished Military Graduate Award ===
Cadets who demonstrated academic and leadership excellence can be designated as a distinguished military student (DMS) or distinguished military graduate (DMG). A Distinguished Military Graduate (DMG) is a cadet who has:

- Maintained high scholastic standards
- Successfully completed ROTC Advanced Camp at Fort Knox, KY
- Graduated with a baccalaureate degree or that the degree will be conferred at the next regular commencement
- Designated as a DMG by the Professor of Military Science
- Ranked in the top 20% of Army ROTC Cadets nationwide

== See also ==
- Early Commissioning Program
- Naval Reserve Officers Training Corps
- Air Force Reserve Officer Training Corps
- Army University
- Military Junior College
- Senior Military College
- Army Officer Candidate School
