= 2nd Reserve Officers' Training Corps Brigade =

2nd ROTC Brigade
- 2nd ROTC Brigade Shoulder Insignia
- Active: Present
- Country: United States of America
- Allegiance: United States Army
- Branch: US Army Reserve
- Type: ROTC Brigade
- Role: Officer Training
- Size: Brigade
- Garrison/HQ: Fort Dix, New Jersey

Commanders
- Commander: COL Allen L. Kehoe
- Command Sergeant Major: CSM Jordan R. Lee

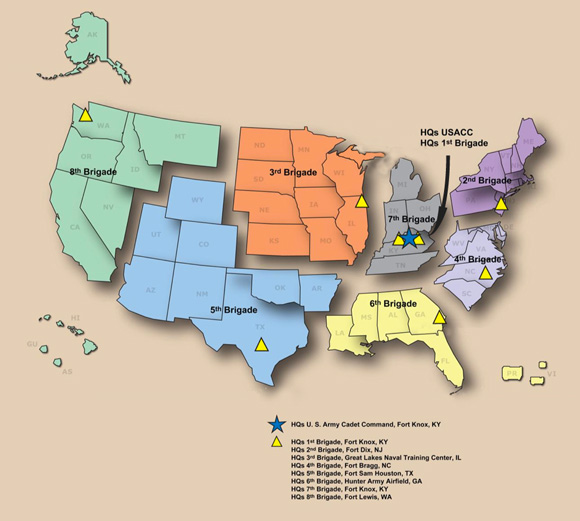
Map of the Army ROTC Brigades

The 2nd Reserve Officers' Training Corps Brigade is an Army Reserve Officers' Training Corps brigade based at Fort Dix, New Jersey.

== 2nd Brigade (ROTC) Host Programs ==
=== Massachusetts ===
- Boston University
- Massachusetts Institute of Technology
- Northeastern University
- University of Massachusetts Amherst
- Worcester Polytechnic Institute

=== Connecticut ===
- University of Connecticut

=== Maine ===
- University of Maine

=== New Hampshire ===
- University of New Hampshire

=== New Jersey ===
- Princeton University
- Rutgers University
- Seton Hall University

=== New York ===
- Canisius College
- City University of New York
- Clarkson University
- Cornell University
- Fordham University
- Hofstra University
- Niagara University
- Rochester Institute of Technology
- SUNY Brockport
- Saint Bonaventure University
- Saint John's University, New York
- Siena College
- Syracuse University
- Stony Brook University

=== Pennsylvania ===
- Bucknell University
- Dickinson College
- Drexel University
- Edinboro University of Pennsylvania
- Gannon University
- Indiana University of Pennsylvania
- Lehigh University
- Lock Haven University of Pennsylvania
- Pennsylvania State University
- Shippensburg University
- Slippery Rock University
- Temple University
- University of Pittsburgh
- University of Scranton
- Widener University

=== Rhode Island ===
- Providence College
- University of Rhode Island

=== Vermont ===
- University of Vermont
