= 8th Reserve Officers' Training Corps Brigade =

8th ROTC Brigade
- 8th ROTC Brigade Shoulder Insignia
- Active: Present
- Country: United States of America
- Allegiance: United States Army
- Branch: US Army Reserve
- Type: ROTC Brigade
- Role: Officer Training
- Size: Brigade
- Garrison/HQ: Joint Base Lewis-McChord, Washington
- Nickname: Viking Brigade
- Motto: Viking Strong!
- Mascot: Viking

Commanders
- Commander: COL George J. Plys
- Command Sergeant Major: CSM Keneti Pauulu

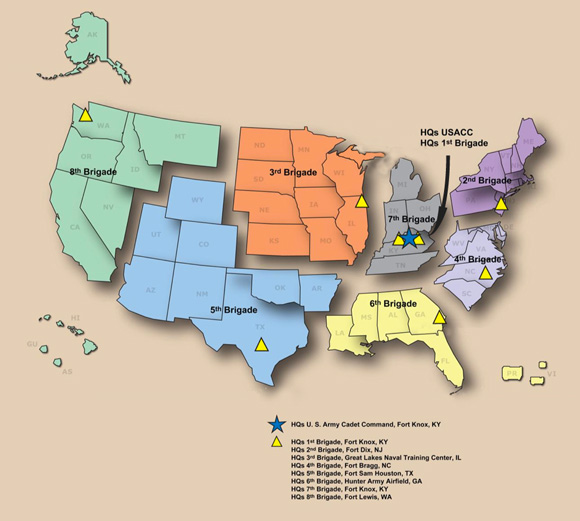
Map of the Army ROTC Brigades

The 8th Reserve Officers' Training Corps Brigade is a United States Army Reserve Officers' Training Corps brigade based at Joint Base Lewis-McChord, Washington.

== Battalions ==
=== Alaska ===
- University of Alaska Fairbanks

=== California ===
- California Polytechnic State University - San Luis Obispo
- California State University - Fresno
- California State University - Fullerton
- Claremont-McKenna College
- San Diego State University
- Santa Clara University, San Jose State University, Stanford University
- University of California - Berkeley
- University of California - Davis
- University of California - Los Angeles
- University of California - Santa Barbara
- University of San Francisco
- University of Southern California

=== Guam ===
- University of Guam

=== Hawaii ===
- University of Hawaii at Manoa

=== Idaho ===
- Brigham Young University - Idaho
- Boise State University
- University of Idaho
- Idaho State University

=== Montana ===
- Montana State University
- University of Montana

=== Nevada ===
- University of Nevada, Las Vegas
- University of Nevada, Reno

=== Oregon ===
- Oregon State University
- University of Oregon
- University of Portland

=== Utah ===
- Brigham Young University
- University of Utah
- Weber State University
- Salt Lake Community College
- Southern Utah University
- Utah State University
- Utah Tech University
- Utah Valley University
- Westminster University

=== Washington ===
- Central Washington University
- Eastern Washington University
- Gonzaga University
- Pacific Lutheran University, Saint Martin's University
- Seattle University
- University of Washington, Seattle Pacific University, Northwest University
- Washington State University

=== Pacific Rim ===
- Korea
- Japan
