= 4th Reserve Officers' Training Corps Brigade =

4th ROTC Brigade
- ROTC shoulder sleeve insignia
- Active: Present
- Country: United States of America
- Branch: United States Army
- Type: ROTC brigade
- Role: Officer Training
- Garrison/HQ: Fort Bragg, North Carolina

Commanders
- Commander: COL Jonathan Post
- Command Sergeant Major: CSM Nathaniel Atkinson

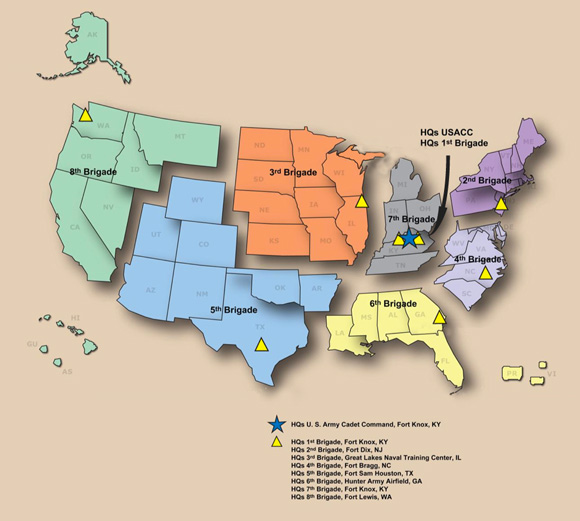
Map of the Army ROTC Brigades

The 4th Reserve Officers' Training Corps Brigade is a United States Army Reserve Officers' Training Corps brigade based in Fort Bragg, North Carolina.

== Brigade universities ==
As per listing on brigade website.

=== Delaware ===
- University of Delaware

=== District of Columbia ===
- Georgetown University
- Howard University

=== Maryland ===
- Bowie State University
- Loyola University
- McDaniel College
- Morgan State University
- Johns Hopkins University
- University of Maryland at College Park

=== North Carolina ===
- Appalachian State University
- Campbell University
- Duke University
- East Carolina University
- Elizabeth City State University
- North Carolina A&T State University
- North Carolina State University
- University of North Carolina at Chapel Hill
- University of North Carolina at Charlotte
- Wake Forest University

=== South Carolina ===
- Clemson University
- Furman University
- Presbyterian College
- South Carolina State University
- University of South Carolina
- Wofford College

=== Virginia ===
- College of William and Mary
- George Mason University
- Hampton University
- James Madison University
- Norfolk State University
- Old Dominion University
- University of Richmond
- University of Virginia
- Virginia State University

=== West Virginia ===
- Marshall University
- West Virginia State University
- West Virginia University
