= Eugene Forrester =

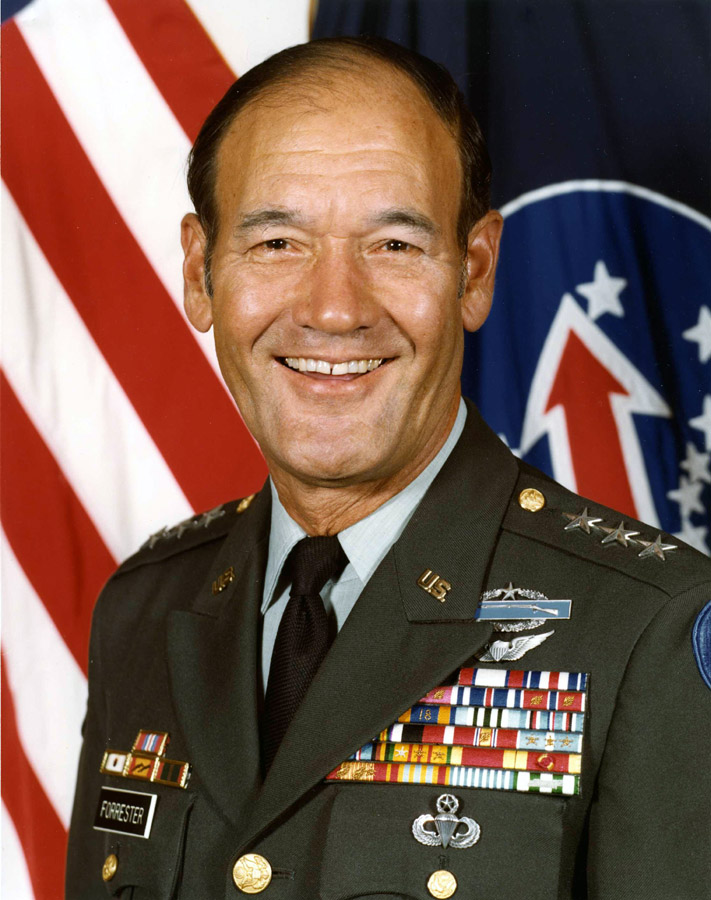
- Born: April 17, 1926; Watertown, Tennessee
- Died: July 25, 2012 (aged 86); Washington, D.C.
- Military career
- Allegiance: United States
- Branch: United States Army
- Service years: 1948–1983
- Rank: General
- Commands: United States Army Western Command; Sixth United States Army; United States Army Recruiting Command; 3rd Brigade, 4th Infantry Division
- Conflicts: Korean War; Vietnam War
- Awards: Army Distinguished Service Medal (2); Silver Star; Legion of Merit (4); Distinguished Flying Cross; Bronze Star Medal (3)

Lieutenant General Eugene Priest Forrester (April 17, 1926 – July 25, 2012) was a senior officer in the United States Army. He served as commander of United States Army Western Command from 1981 until his retirement in 1983.

== Education ==
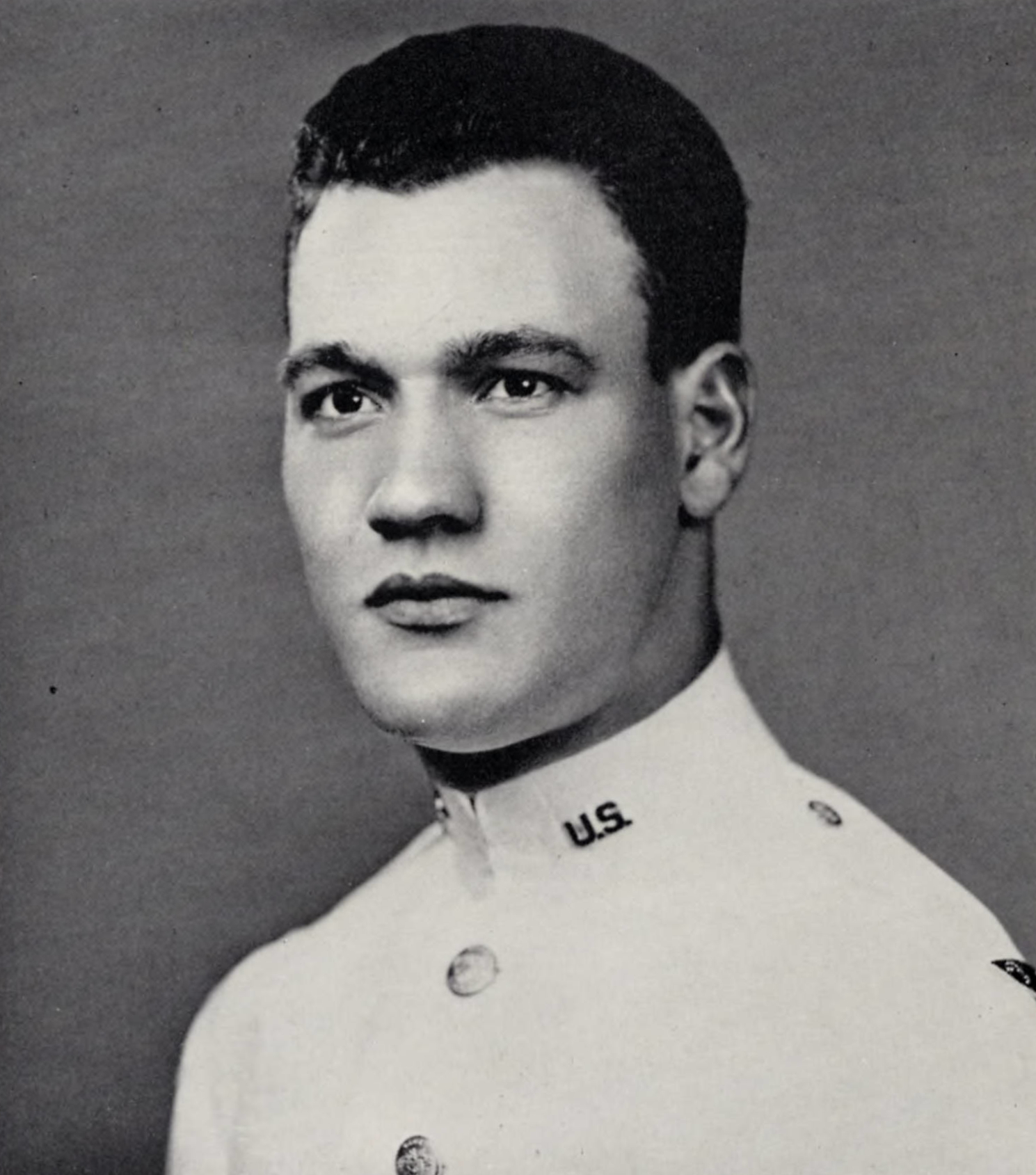
Forrester as a United States Military Academy cadet c. 1948

Forrester graduated from the United States Military Academy at West Point, New York in 1948, where he was a classmate of Alexander Haig. He also earned a Master of International Studies from George Washington University and a Legum Doctor from Chung Ang University in Korea. His military schooling includes the Armed Forces Staff College, the British Army Staff College and the National War College.

== Military career ==
Following graduation from West Point in 1948, Forrester had an additional year of infantry training before being assigned to the 350th Infantry Regiment, U.S. Forces - Austria. There he served two years (1950 -1952) as a platoon leader, company commander, and finally as aide to Major General Paul Wilkins Kendall, the commanding general of the U.S. Zone in Austria.

In June 1952, Forrester accompanied Kendall to South Korea, continuing to serve as his aide until October 1952. Forrester was then given command of Company E, 2nd Battalion, 9th Infantry Regiment, 2nd Infantry Division. The company occupied outposts and conducted company combat raids against North Korean and Chinese forces in the area around Old Baldy and Pork Chop Hill. In March 1953, Forrester's company was attacked while in the middle of a unit night rotation of the outpost on Little Gibraltar. He rallied several platoons and led a night counterattack that after several hours of battle, recovered control of the outpost. Forrester's Korean tour ended in July 1953 when he was again selected by now Lieutenant General Kendall for aide duty in Japan. That lasted until December when Forrester departed to attend the Infantry Officer Advance Course (1954) at Fort Benning, Georgia, followed by assignment to the U.S. Army Military Academy at West Point as tactical officer.

In 1956, Forrester was selected for early promotion to Major. The next year he attended the Army Command and General Staff College, Fort Leavenworth, Kansas. This began a succession of schools and staff duty - a year at the British Army Staff College; two years on the staff at Headquarters, Supreme Headquarters Allied Powers Europe (SHAPE) in Paris, France; and in January 1963 the Armed Forces Staff College, Norfolk, Virginia. Forrester returned to troop duty in July 1963 with an assignment as Deputy Commander, 2nd Airborne Battle Group, 504th Infantry, 82nd Airborne Division. He soon became the division Plans and Operations Officer (G3) and played a key role in the division's successful invasion of the Dominican Republic in 1965. Next came an assignment as Military Assistant to the Secretary of the Army before attending the National War College (1967). This was followed in August 1967 with assignment to South Vietnam as a plans officer in Headquarters, U.S. Army Vietnam.

Forrester was selected for early promotion to colonel, and in February 1968 he was given command of the 3rd Brigade, 4th Infantry Division. Forrester led the brigade in operations on the coast and in the mountains of Central Vietnam where, among other awards, he was awarded the Silver Star for gallantry in action. This was followed by another tour on the Army staff in the Pentagon as executive officer to the Army Vice Chief Staff (1969 -1970).

In February 1970, Forrester was sent to helicopter flight school in preparation for return to Vietnam an assistant division commander for the 1st Cavalry Division (Airmobile). He arrived at the division's headquarters in May 1970, beginning a senior officer extended tour of 18–24 months, just in time to participate in the Cambodian Incursion (May–June).

In October 1970, Forrester was selected to be Deputy Assistant Chief of Staff, Civil Operations and Revolutionary Development Support (CORDS) at Headquarters, Military Assistance Command, Vietnam (MACV). A very brief awards ceremony was held before his departure on leave from the division. It was a rushed affair at which several medals were presented without reading the citations to Forrester. Among the awards was a second Silver Star. Forrester then departed on leave to visit his family in the Philippines. Unknown to him, the Silver Star citation claimed to be for his actions on 9 June 1970 during the Cambodian Campaign. It stated that Forrester was flying in his command helicopter when he directed ground troops in an engagement and came under enemy fire. The helicopter then delivered ammunition to the troops and evacuated wounded. However, enlisted men in the 1st Cavalry Division's awards and decorations office revealed that, lacking specific information and pressed for time, they had been ordered to fabricate the action on short notice so that Forrester could receive the medal before he left the division. Following an investigation that exonerated Forrester from any blame, the award was rescinded and the division chief of staff who instigated the award was reprimanded. Following his return from leave, Forrester continued to serve in his position at CORDS.

On his return to the United States in August 1971, Forrester was assigned to a series of senior Army staff director and command positions including the oversight of the amnesty program for Vietnam era deserters and draft evaders.

Major commands for Forrester included the United States Army Administration Center at Fort Harrison, Indiana, from 1973 to 1975. He commanded the United States Army Recruiting Command at Fort Sheridan, Illinois, from 1975 to 1978. Prior to his Hawaiian command he commanded the Sixth United States Army at the Presidio, and then the Combined Field Army in South Korea.

Among Forrester's decorations are the Army Distinguished Service Medal with oak leaf cluster, the Silver Star, the Legion of Merit with three oak leaf clusters, the Distinguished Flying Cross, and the Bronze Star Medal with two oak leaf clusters.

Forrester died in Washington, D.C. in 2012.
