= 3rd Reserve Officers' Training Corps Brigade =

3rd ROTC Brigade
- 3rd ROTC Brigade Shoulder Insignia
- Active: Present
- Country: United States of America
- Allegiance: United States Army
- Branch: US Army Reserve
- Type: ROTC Brigade
- Role: Officer Training
- Size: Brigade
- Garrison/HQ: Great Lakes Naval Training Center, Illinois

Commanders
- Commander: COL Austin S. Cruz
- Command Sergeant Major: CSM Kyle E. Keenan

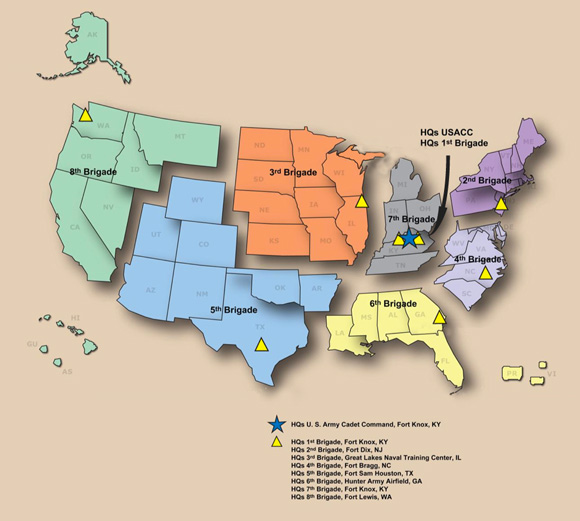
Map of the Army ROTC Brigades

The 3rd Reserve Officers' Training Corps Brigade is an Army Reserve Officers' Training Corps brigade based at the Great Lakes Naval Training Center, Illinois. The Commander is COL Adam Lewis and the Command Sergeant Major is CSM Gareth Kilpatrick.

== Battalions ==
=== Illinois ===
- Eastern Illinois University
- Illinois State University
- Loyola University Chicago
- Northern Illinois University
- Southern Illinois University Carbondale
- Southern Illinois University Edwardsville
- University of Illinois - Chicago
- University of Illinois Urbana-Champaign
- Western Illinois University
- Wheaton College
- Robert Morris University (Illinois)

=== Iowa ===
- Iowa State University
- University of Iowa
- University of Northern Iowa

=== Kansas ===
- Kansas State University
- Pittsburg State University
- University of Kansas

=== Michigan ===
- Michigan Technological University
- Northern Michigan University

=== Minnesota ===
- Minnesota State University, Mankato
- Bethany Lutheran College
- Gustavus Adolphus College
- Saint John's University
- Saint Cloud State University
- University of Minnesota - Twin Cities

=== Missouri ===
- University of Central Missouri
- University of Missouri
- Truman State University
- Missouri State University
- Washington University in St. Louis
- Missouri University of Science and Technology

=== Nebraska ===
- Creighton University
- University of Nebraska–Lincoln
- University of Nebraska at Kearney

=== North Dakota ===
- North Dakota State University
- University of North Dakota

=== South Dakota ===
- South Dakota School of Mines
- South Dakota State University
- University of South Dakota

=== Wisconsin ===
- Marquette University
- University of Wisconsin–La Crosse
- University of Wisconsin–Madison
- University of Wisconsin–Stevens Point

Fox Valley Battalion

- University of Wisconsin–Oshkosh
- Ripon College
- Marian University
- St. Norbert College
- University of Wisconsin–Green Bay

The Badger Battalion:

- University of Wisconsin–Whitewater
- Maranatha Baptist University
- Edgewood College

The Northwoods Battalion:

- University of Wisconsin–Stout
- University of Wisconsin–Eau Claire
- University of Wisconsin–River Falls
