= MSCC =

MSCC is a four-letter acronym, and may refer to:

- Marine Science Co-ordination Committee
- Metastatic spinal cord compression
- Microsemi Corporation
- Mid-South Community College
- Middle School Cadet Corps
- Motlow State Community College
