= Penn State Army ROTC =

United States military unit

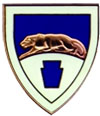
- Penn State Army ROTC Crest
- Active: 1863
- Country: USA
- Branch: AROTC
- Garrison/HQ: Fort Dix, NJ
- Website: army.psu.edu

The Penn State Army Reserve Officers' Training Corps (PSU AROTC) is the ROTC department at The Pennsylvania State University. It is the largest branch of the ROTC program at the school, which also has Naval ROTC and Air Force ROTC. The Nittany Lion Battalion (NLB) is one of the 41 participating battalions in the 2nd Reserve Officers' Training Corps Brigade, also known as the Freedom Brigade. The brigade is headquartered at Fort Dix, NJ, and comprises ROTC programs in the North Eastern United States including CT, MA, ME, NH, NJ, NY, PA, RI, and VT.

== History ==
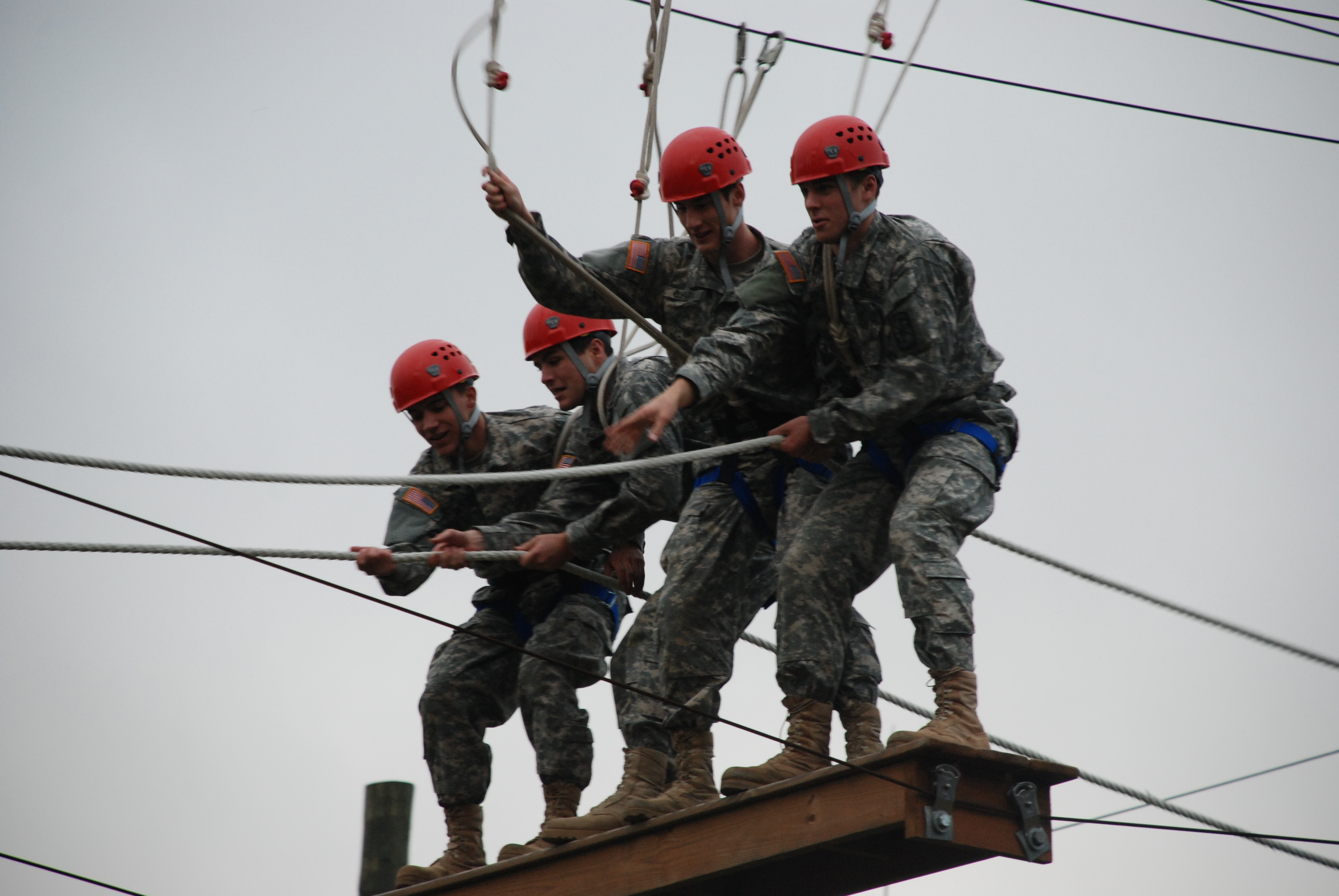
Penn State Army ROTC Cadets executing the Ropes Course at Stone Valley

Penn State's role in national defense dates from 1863, when it was designated a place for boys to be land-grant institution under the Morrill Act. Congress included military training as part of the mission of land-grant colleges. The Civil War was then raging, and the concept of broad-based military preparedness was very important to lawmakers. In 1917, to address World War I's need for trained military leaders, the University established a component of the Reserve Officers Training Corps (ROTC). The ROTC provided military instruction in addition to standard academic studies and awarded reserve officers' commissions to students upon graduation. During World War I, in a gesture that would become a hallmark of Penn State's commitment to the military, the University volunteered the use of the University Park campus grounds and buildings to the War Department and the Pennsylvania National Guard for training purposes. In addition, the University provided technological training to students headed off to war, as well as national defense research through its schools of engineering and agriculture. Penn State's involvement in defense-related activities expanded during World War II to include additional personnel-training programs, as well as government-funded research projects. Penn State furnished defense-related training to more than 140,000 at 200 communities across the state, and provided instruction to thousands more at the University Park campus.

Currently, 19 of Penn State's 24 locations offer at least one ROTC program either as a host unit or in partnership with another Pennsylvania college or university. Penn State's Tri-Service ROTC is consistently in the top of the Big Ten in ROTC enrollment. All three programs are top-ranked nationally and have received high marks during external inspections and audits compared with their counterparts across the country.

In the fall of 2010 a team of 10 students from the Penn State Army ROTC came out on top of squads from 43 other northeastern schools in the regional Ranger Challenge Competition held on Oct. 24, near West Point, N.Y. The Penn State's victory propels them to the historic Sandhurst Military Skills Competition, which has been held annually since 1967, where they will compete with squads from across the nation and around the world. This year's competition will be held on April 16, 2011, at the United States Military Academy at West Point.

Penn State has been the largest ROTC program in the Big Ten Conference. Females comprise 14 percent of Penn State ROTC students, which is close to each service's norms; however, ethnicity percentages are lower than each service's norms. Penn State's Army ROTC enrollment comprises 16 percent of all Pennsylvania schools' Army ROTC enrollment. Army ROTC cadets most favor the crime, law and justice major, followed by engineering. About one-fourth of all Penn State ROTC students are on the dean's list. All ROTC students must meet and maintain academic, aptitude, medical, and physical requirements. Beginning in the Fall semester of 2008, a special living option in Brumbaugh Hall in East Halls has been offered to freshman ROTC students, which has proven popular, as male student spaces are at capacity. One-fourth of Army students have chosen to live in this residence hall.

== Progression ==
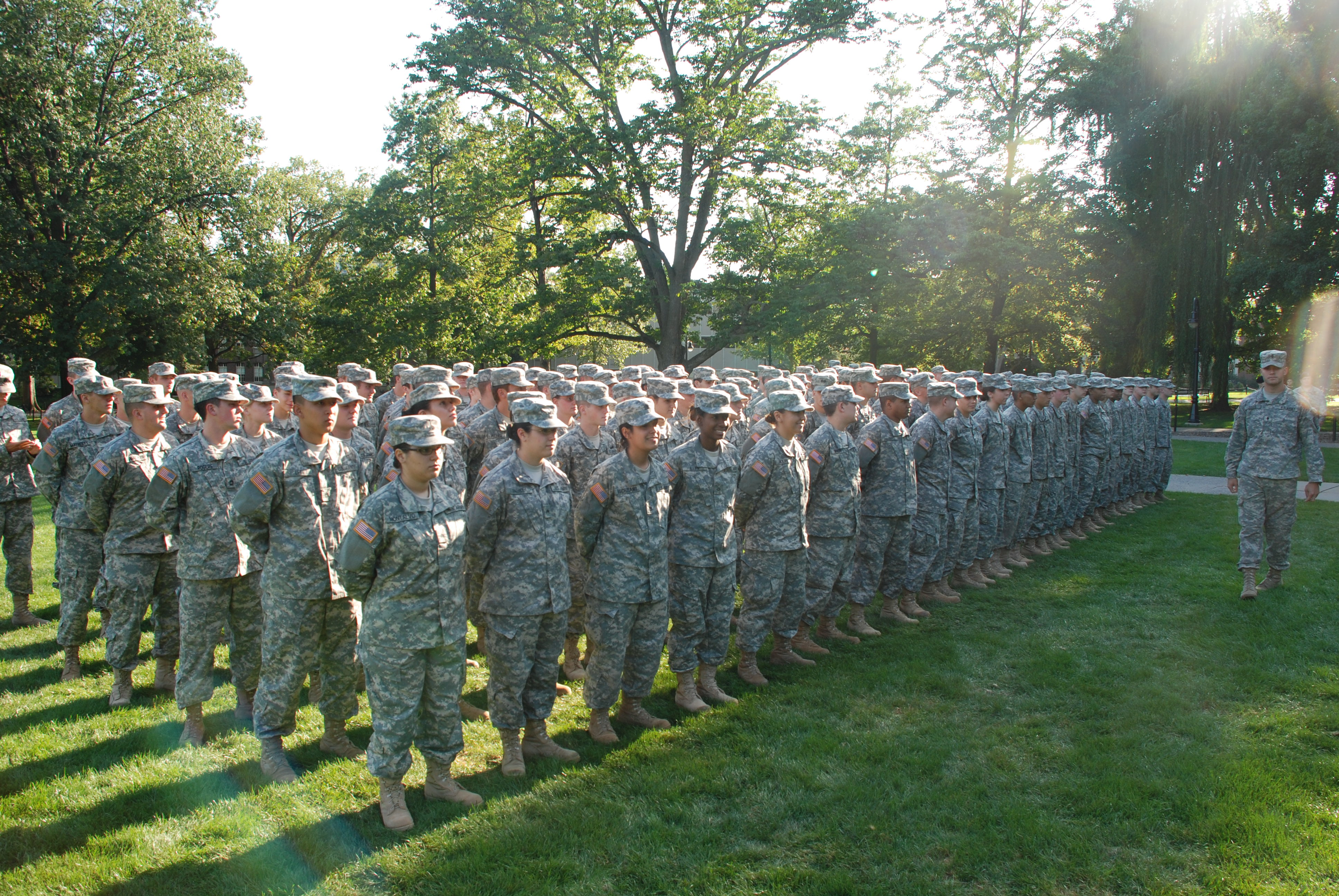
Penn State Army ROTC cadets in company formation on the Old Main Lawn

For a cadet who takes only the first two years of ROTC (basic course), there is no military obligation, unless the student accepts a scholarship or enrolls in the Simultaneous Membership Program (SMP). An SMP cadet is simultaneously an ROTC cadet and a member of the Army Reserve or National Guard. The last two years of the program is called the advanced course. All advance course cadets sign a contract and agree to serve on either active duty or in a reserve component (Army National Guard or Army Reserve) after graduation. This enlistment contract places the cadet in the United States Army Reserve Control Group (ROTC) so they can be paid at least a stipend during the school year and for training during the summer between the junior and senior years.

== Course of instruction ==
All Army ROTC courses at Penn State have three components: classroom instruction, physical readiness training, and Leadership Labs. Each level of ROTC have their own classroom instruction periods. Freshmen and sophomores have one 50-minute class each week, while juniors and seniors have two 75-minute classes each week. Everyone participates as a group for an hour-long physical readiness training session, three times each week. The weekly two-hour Leadership Labs are planned and conducted by the students. The ROTC Cadets are organized as a battalion with senior Cadets serving in leadership and staff positions from the platoon to battalion level. Junior Cadets receive separate training to prepare them for the Leader Development and Assessment Course (LDAC). Sophomores lead squads and help train the freshmen Cadets on a range of military skills and knowledge.

=== Basic course ===
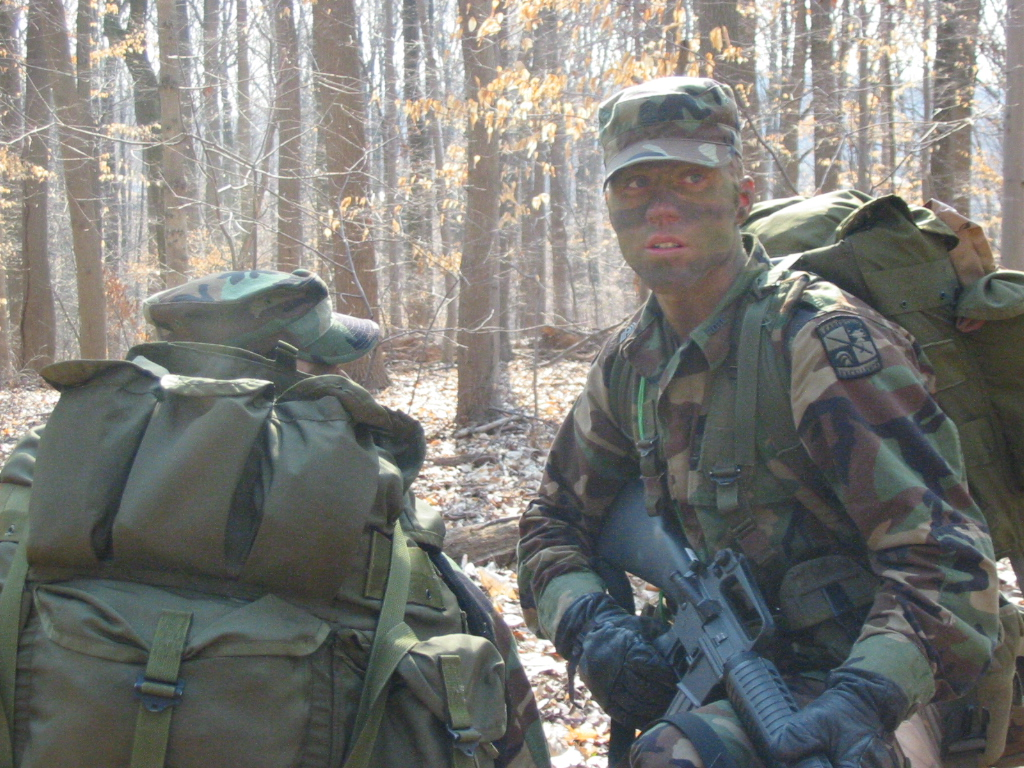
Army ROTC cadets on a field training exercise

Military Science I Year (MSI)

This year serves as the cadets’ first introduction to the Army. Topics covered include military courtesy, military history, basic first aid, basic rifle marksmanship, basic hand grenade use, land navigation, rappelling, fundamentals of leadership, map orienteering, field training, and drill and ceremony.

Cadet Initial Entrance Training (CIET)

CIET is four weeks of intense classroom and field training held in the summer at Fort Knox, KY. The course is intended for MSL I (and some MSL II) Cadets who have received contracts in the year or two prior. It is the first of two mandatory courses in order for Cadets to complete ROTC training.

Military Science II Year (MSII)

The second year is an expansion of the topics taught in the first year of the program. Cadets are introduced to tactics, troop leading procedures, basics of operations orders, and ethics.

=== Advanced course ===
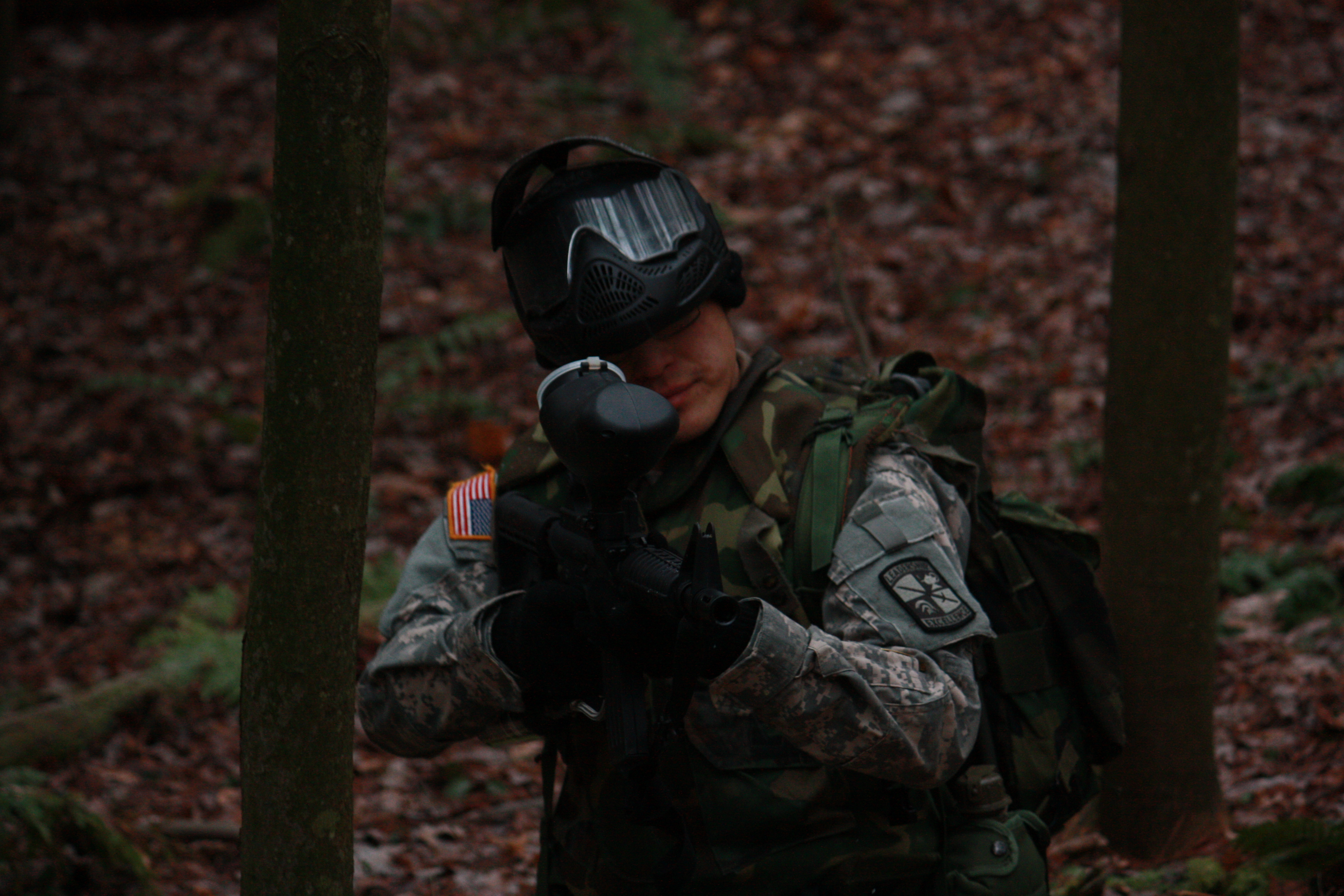
Penn State Army ROTC Cadet takes aim during a Field Training Exercise

Military Science III Year (MSIII)

The third year marks the beginning of the Advanced Course. This is where most cadets must contract with the Army to continue in the program. Cadets may be eligible for the Advanced Course if the following criteria are met:

- The cadet has prior military service OR
- The cadet took three or more years of JROTC in high school OR
- The cadet has completed the first two years of the program (Basic Course) OR
- The cadet has graduated the Leaders Training Course (formerly Basic Camp) at Ft. Knox AND
- The cadet has completed 54 credits (at least 60 preferred) of college coursework.

The course sequence in this year is mainly focused on the application of leadership and small-unit tactics. Cadets are assigned rotating leadership positions within the School Battalion and are evaluated on their performance and leadership abilities while in those positions. Third-year cadets practice briefing operations orders, executing small-unit tactics, leading and participating in physical training, and preparing for successful performance at the four-week Leader Development and Assessment Course during the summer following the third year. Under current regulations, unless the cadet is in the Nursing program, attendance at the course is mandatory (in the past, Ranger School was offered as an alternative to select cadets).

Cadet Leadership Course (CLC)

Also at Fort Knox, CLC is a new style of training from the formerly LDAC. At three weeks long, Cadets are trained and instructed on leadership abilities, in class and field. Additionally, Cadets take three primary assessment tests which go into their point value on the Order of Merit List.

Military Science IV Year (MSIV)

This is the final year of the ROTC program and the main focus is towards preparing cadets to become successful lieutenants in the Army upon graduation and commissioning. Senior cadets apply for their branches (career fields). Senior cadets apply before end of their third year but have until mid September to make any changes before they are locked in. In early September, cadets are notified of which service and status they were granted (e.g., Regular Army, Army Reserve, Army National Guard; as well as whether they will be active duty or not). The next thing they will be notified is the branch of choice in mid October. Last but not least, cadets will be given their requested first duty location from late March through early April. In the meantime, senior cadets are assigned cadet battalion staff positions and are responsible for evaluating MS III cadets, planning and coordinating training operations and missions. MSL IV's main goal is to teach and train MSL I, II and III cadets as well as be a mentor and establish sustainable systems to meet all requirements and provide quality training designed to develop and prepare the best leaders for United States Army.

== Organization ==
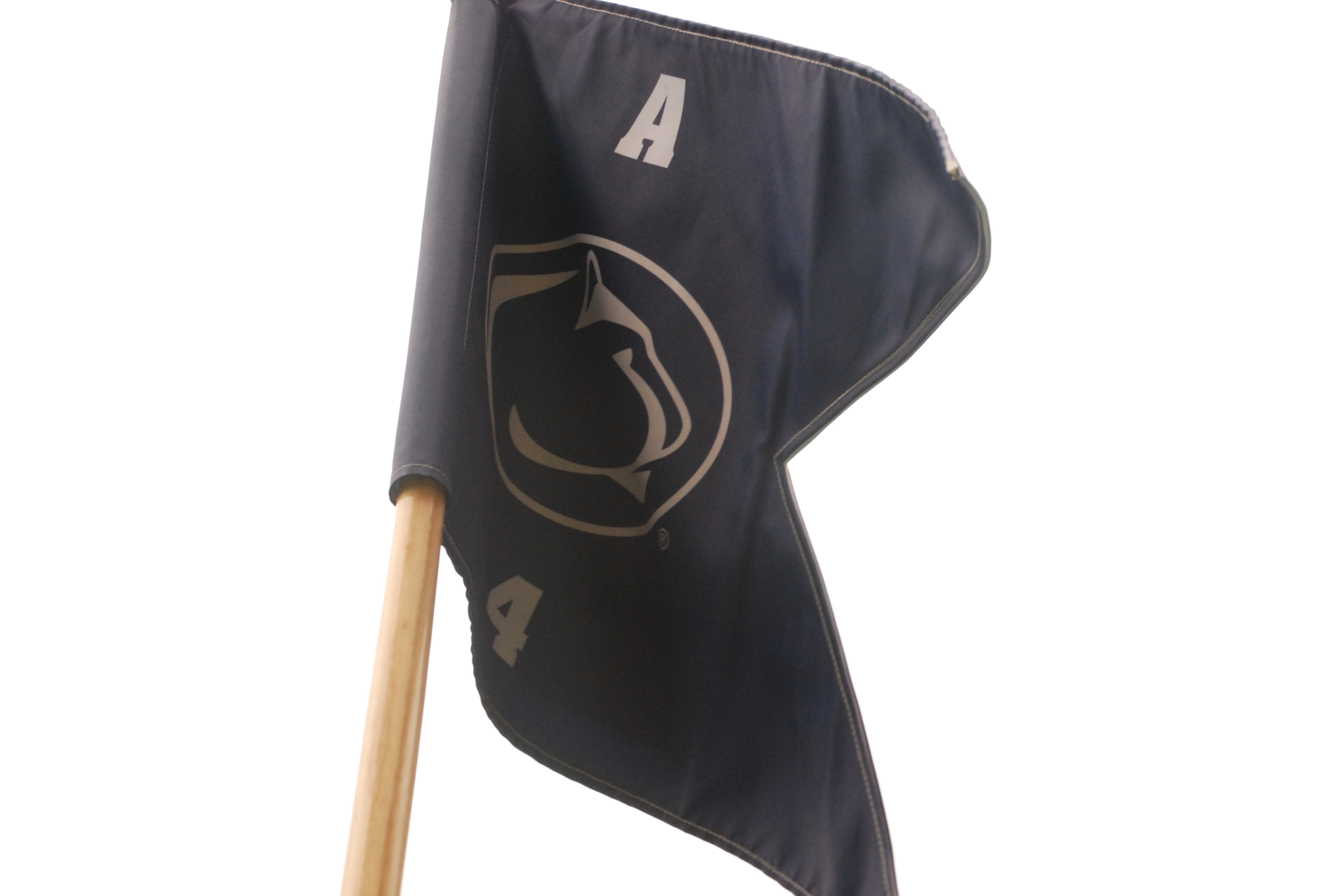
Penn State Army ROTC Platoon Guidon

The Penn State Nittany Lion Battalion is a Cadet run battalion, which means the cadre supervise, but the senior cadets (MS IVs) organize, develop, and execute training. As of Fall 2015, the Nittany Lion Battalion has five companies. Four are located at University Park; Alpha Company, Bravo Company, Charlie Company, and the Higher Headquarters Company (HHC) and Delta Company is located at the Altoona Commonwealth campus.

Battalion HHC (University Park, PA - Main Campus)

Led by select MS IV cadets. HHC includes the Battalion Commander with his Battalion XO, CSM, and staff (S-1, S-3, S-4, S-6, PAO, etc.) - each with a team of MSL IV Cadets.

Alpha, Bravo, and Charlie Companies (University Park, PA - Main Campus)

In charge of each company are Commanders, Executive Officers, and First Sergeants. Each company is made of 2 Platoons, led by Platoon Leader and Platoon Sergeant. MSL III and IV cadets are in charge of each Platoon and Company, while MSL II cadets lead the Squads found in each Platoon. Companies are made of approximately 60-70 Cadets from all four class levels.

== Notable graduates ==
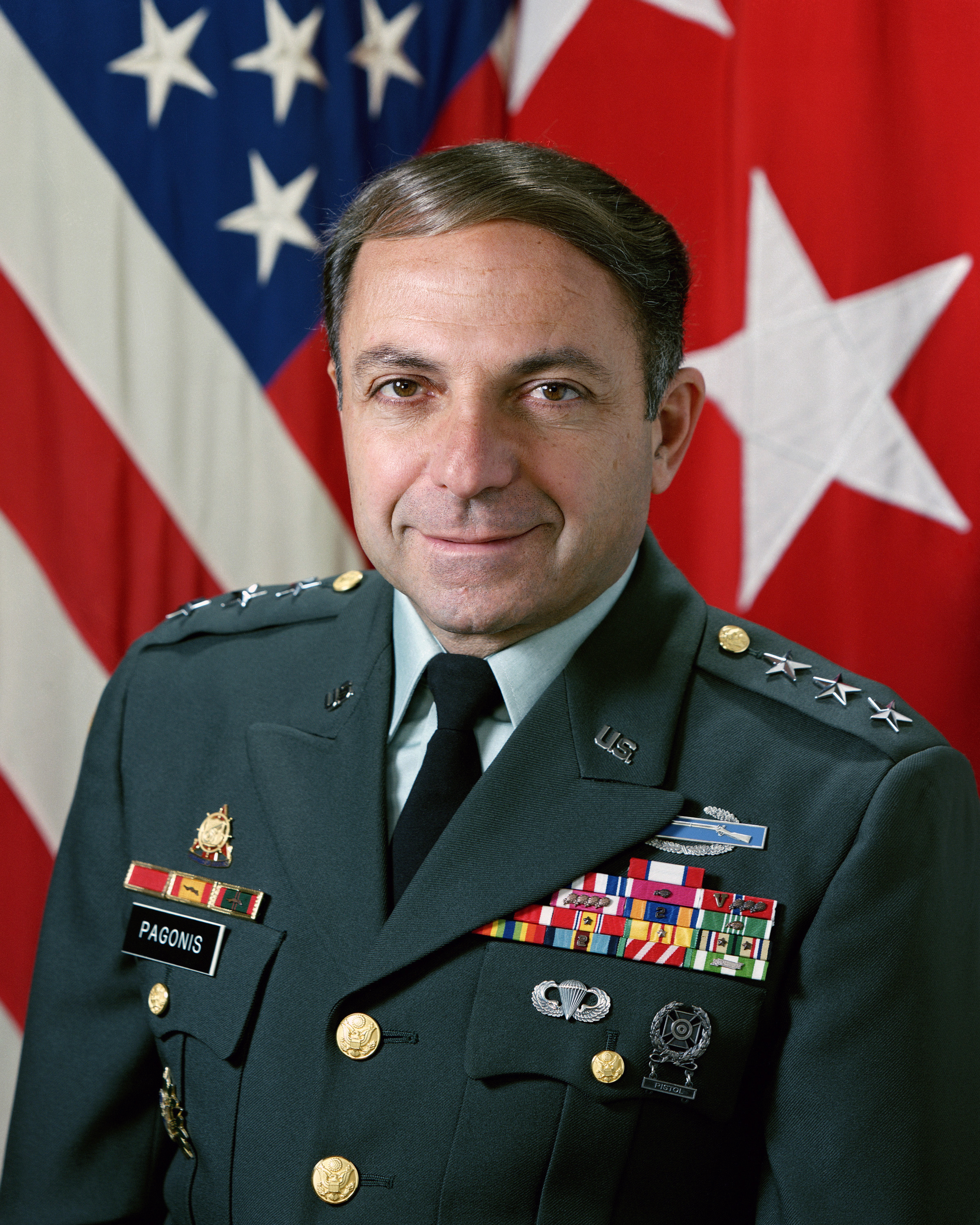
LTG William Pagonis, Penn State ROTC '64

- GEN Gary Brito
- LTG William Pagonis
- LTG John J. Yeosock
- LTG Vaughn O. Lang
- COL David E. Pergrin
- Honorable Samuel E. Hayes, Jr.
- LTG Charles W. Eifler, BS Engineering 1936, ROTC

== Awards ==
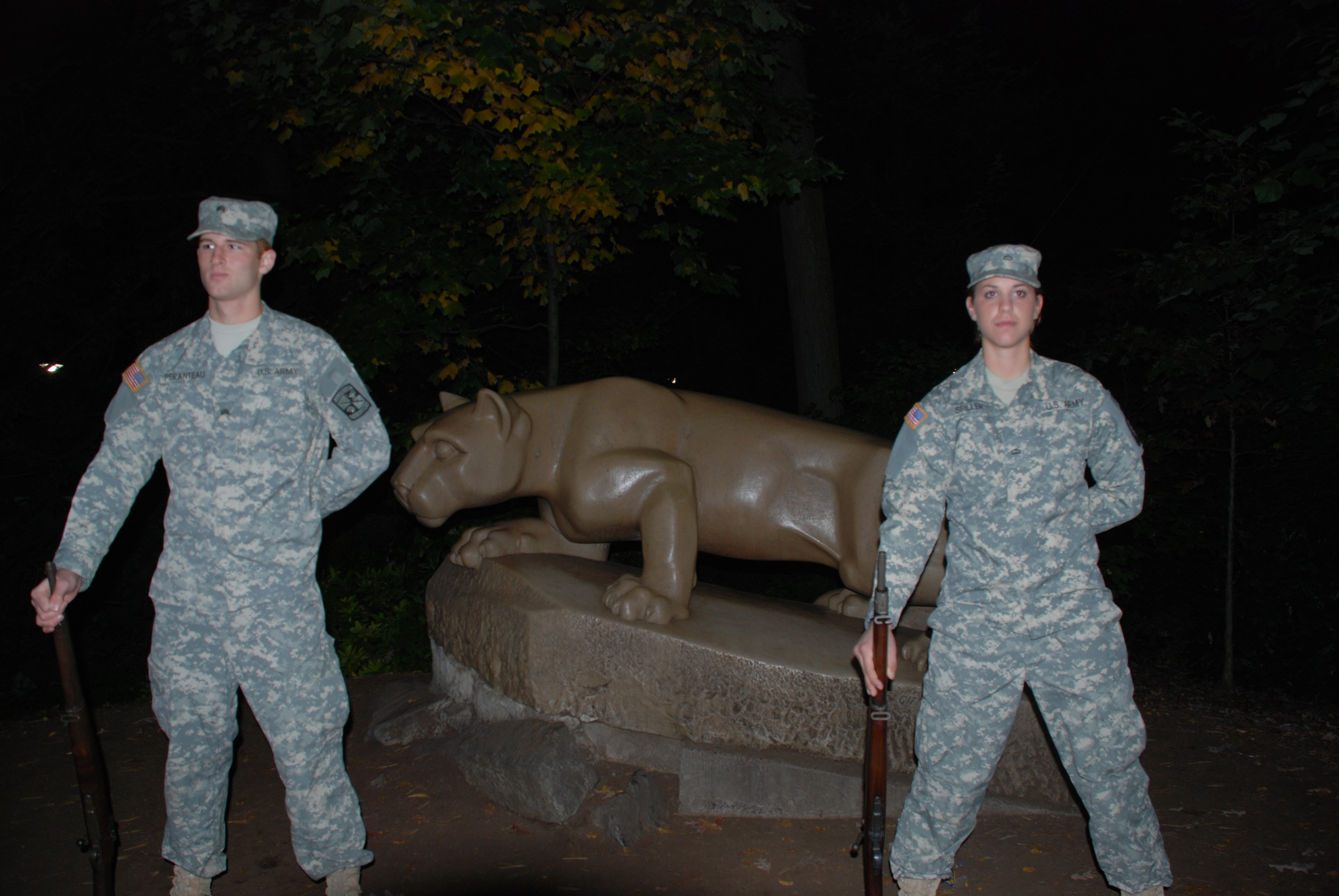
Penn State Army ROTC Cadets Guarding the Lion Shrine during Homecoming Week. This detail is headed by the Lion's Guard, PSU Army ROTC's Drill and Ceremony team

There are three Department of the Army decorations authorized exclusively to cadets:

- ROTC Medal for Heroism
- Superior Cadet Decoration Award
- Ranger Challenge Tab

Outside these, cadets are eligible for numerous U.S. Army awards and decorations, as well as awards and decorations sponsored by various military societies and organizations. These include:

- Legion of Valor Bronze Cross for Achievement
- National Defense Transportation Association (NDTA) Award
- Same Award (Society of American Military Engineers)
- National Defense Industrial Association (NDIA) (Formerly the American Defense Preparedness Association - ADPA Gold Scholarship Key Award)
- Association of the United States Army (AUSA) Award
- American Legion Awards (General Military Excellence and Scholastic Excellence)
- Sons of the American Revolution (SAR) Award
- The Retired Officers' Association (TROA) Medal
- Society of the War of 1812 Award
- George C. Marshall ROTC Award
- Military Order of the Purple Heart Leadership Medal Award
- United States Field Artillery Association Award
- Army Aviation Association of America Award
- AFCEA Award For Distinguished Performance
- General and Mrs. Matthew B. Ridgway Military History Research Fellowship
- Military Order of World Wars Awards
- Daughters of the American Revolution
- American Veterans Outstanding Cadet Award
- Reserve Officers Association Awards
- USAA Spirit Award
- Veterans of Foreign Wars Award
- National Society of Daughters of Founders and Patriots of America Award
- National Sojourners Award
- Supreme Council of the Scottish Rite of Freemasonry Award
- Military Officers Association of America Award
- Special Forces Association Award
- American Veterans of World War II, Korea, and Vietnam Award
- Armed Forces Communications and Electronics Association Education Foundation Award
