= Medin =

Medin or MEDIN may refer to

- Medin (name)
- the Marine Environmental Data and Information Network
- Medin, a district of Damascus: possibly this is Al-Midan?
- Medin, a district of Kaluga
- Medin, an amyloidogenic fragment derived from lactadherin
- MedinTux, a free healthcare software
