= Junior Reserve Officers' Training Corps =

US military education program

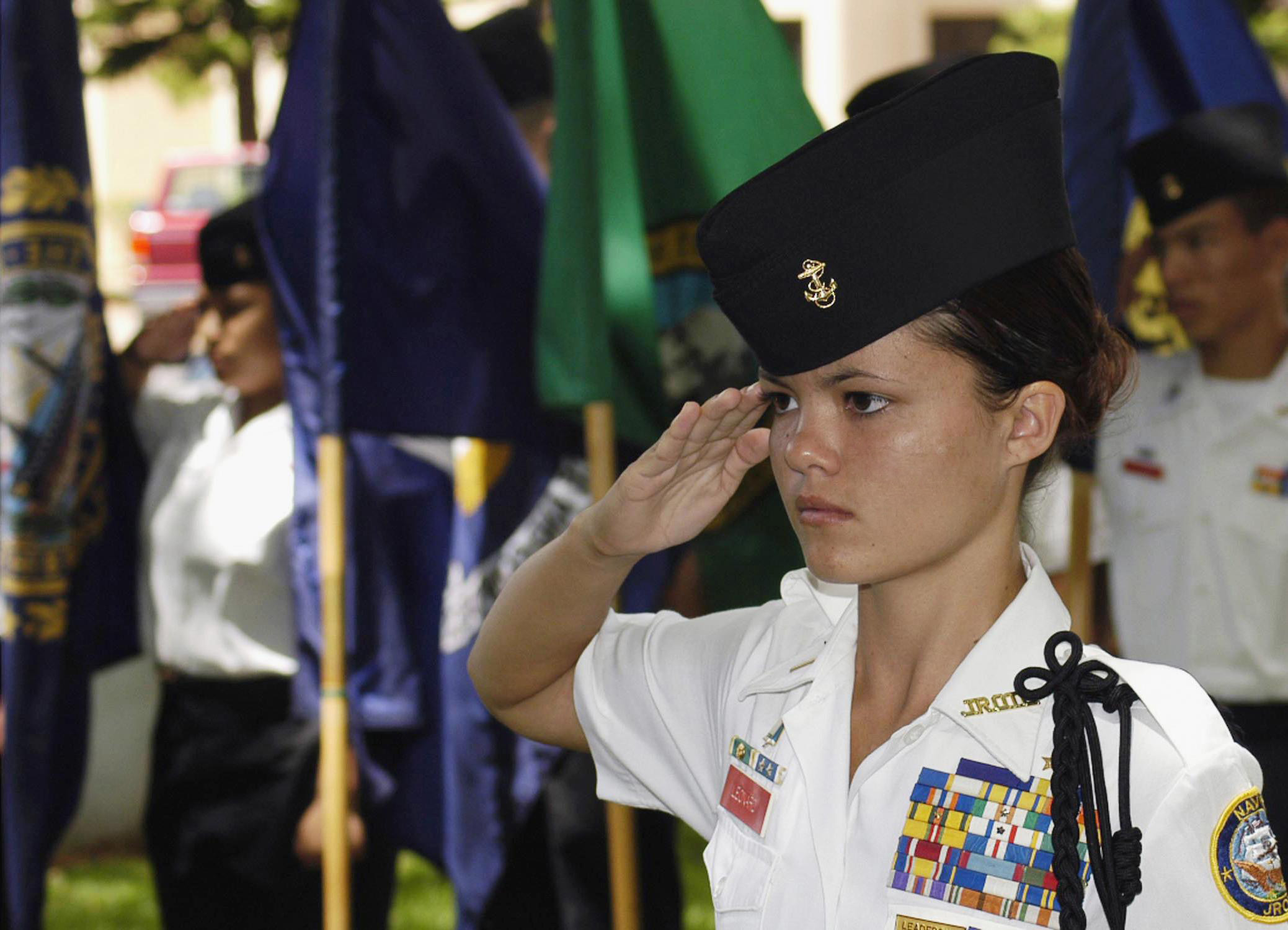
A Navy JROTC cadet salutes during the parading of the colors ceremony held at Pearl Harbor, Hawaii

The Junior Reserve Officers' Training Corps (JROTC) is a federal program sponsored by the United States Armed Forces in high schools and also in some middle schools across the United States and at US military bases across the world. The program was originally created as part of the National Defense Act of 1916 (Army JROTC) and later expanded (Navy, Marine Corps and Air Force) under the 1964 ROTC Vitalization Act. The Coast Guard was added in 1989 under P.L. 101-225. The Space Force established its first unit in 2019.

== Role and purpose ==
According to Title 10, Section 2031 of the United States Code, the purpose of the Junior Reserve Officers' Training Corps is "to instill in students in [the United States] secondary educational institutions the values of citizenship, service to the United States, and personal responsibility and a sense of accomplishment." Additional objectives are established by the service departments of the Department of Defense. Under 542.4 of Title 32 (National Defense) of the Code of Federal Regulations, the Department of the Army has declared those objectives for each cadet to be:

U.S. Air Force Capt. Joshua Hawkins, Thunderbird 10, Executive Officer, autographs a brochure for an Air Force Junior Reserve Officer Training Corp (JROTC) cadet during the Shaw Air Expo at Shaw Air Force Base.

- Developing citizenship and patriotism
- Developing self-reliance and responsiveness to all authority
- Improving the ability to communicate well both orally and in writing
- Developing an appreciation of the importance of physical fitness
- Increasing a respect for the role of the U.S. Armed Forces in support of national objectives
- Developing a knowledge of team building skills and basic military skills
- Taking 1–3 years of the course grants cadets the ability to rank higher if they pursue a military career.

Section 524.5 of the CFR National Defense title states in part that JROTC should "provide meaningful leadership instruction of benefit to the student and of value to the Armed Forces. ...Students will acquire: (1) An understanding of the fundamental concept of leadership, military art and science, (2) An introduction to related professional knowledge, and (3) An appreciation of requirements for national security. The dual roles of citizen/soldier and soldier/citizen are studied. ... These programs will enable cadets to better serve their country as leaders, as citizens, and in military service should they enter it. ... The JROTC and NDCC are not, of themselves, officer-producing programs but should create favorable attitudes and impressions toward the Services and toward careers in the Armed Forces." This, importantly, does not mean the cadet has any obligation to join any branch of the Armed Forces as the last sentence stresses.

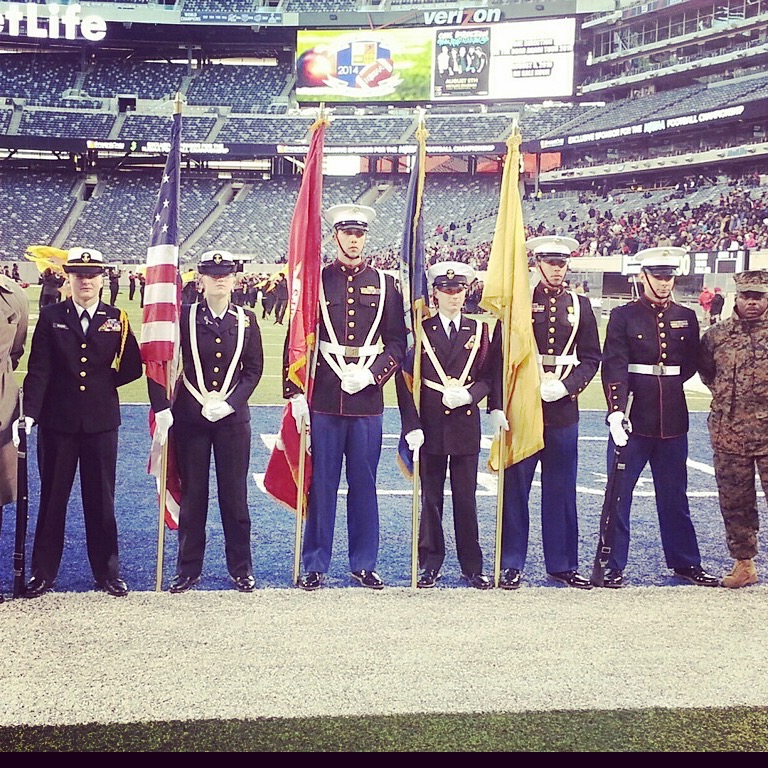
Cadets from Elizabeth High School's MCJROTC and Linden High School's NJROTC hold a joint honor guard colors posting ceremony at MetLife Stadium in East Rutherford, New Jersey

From 1916 to 1971, JROTC programs were not open to full participation from female students. Beginning in 1973 female participation was allowed in both college ROTC and high school JROTC when President Gerald Ford signed Public Law 93-165.

The military has stated that JROTC will inform young Americans about the opportunities available in the military and "may help motivate young Americans toward military service." A 1999 Army policy memorandum stated that "While not designed to be a specific recruiting tool, there is nothing in existing law that precludes ... facilitating the recruitment of young men and women into the U.S. Army," directing instructors to "actively assist cadets who want to enlist in the military [and] emphasize service in the U.S. Army; facilitate recruiter access to cadets in JROTC program and to the entire student body ... [and] work closely with high school guidance counselors to sell the Army story."

In a February 2000 testimony before the House Armed Services Committee, the armed service chiefs of staff testified that 30%–50% of graduating JROTC cadets go on to join the military:

- General James L. Jones, then Commandant of the Marine Corps, testified that the value of the Marine JROTC program "is beyond contest. Fully one-third of our young men and women who join a Junior ROTC program wind up wearing the uniform of a Marine."
- Army JRTOC Cadet Samantha Collins, Graham Kapowsin High School sophomore, bounds down the 40-foot rappel tower on Joint Base Lewis-McChord, Wash., during the JROTC Cadet Leadership Challenge Iron Horse 15 with 1st Special Forces Group Soldiers.
  General Eric K. Shinseki, then Chief of Staff of the United States Army, testified that "Our indications are about 30 percent of those youngsters—we don't recruit them, as you know. We are not permitted to do that. But by virtue of the things that they like about that experience, about 30 percent of them end up joining the Army, either enlisting or going on to ROTC and then joining the officer population."
- General Michael E. Ryan, then Chief of Staff of the United States Air Force, testified that "almost 50 percent of the folks that go [...] out of the Air Force Junior ROTC go into one of the Services by enlisting or going to ROTC or going to one of the academies."
- Admiral Jay L. Johnson, then Chief of Naval Operations, testified that "Even if the number is only 30 percent, that is a good number. But think about what we get out of the other 70 percent. They have exposure to us. They have exposure to the military. And the challenge of the education mandate that we all share in principals and school counselors and school districts that won't let us in, that is a powerful tool I think to educate whether or not they end up in the service. So it is a long way around saying it is well worth the investment for lots of different reasons."

NJROTC cadets visiting USS Theodore Roosevelt in November 2005

General Colin Powell said in his 1995 autobiography that "the armed forces might get a youngster more inclined to enlist as a result of Junior ROTC," but added that "Inner-city kids, many from broken homes, found stability and role models in Junior ROTC." U.S. Congress found in the Recruiting, Retention, and Reservist Promotion Act of 2000 that JROTC and similar programs "provide significant benefits for the Armed Forces, including significant public relations benefits." Former United States Secretary of Defense William Cohen referred to JROTC as "one of the best recruitment programs we could have."

== Organization ==
Army JROTC shoulder sleeve insignia

Marine Corps JROTC insignia

Navy JROTC insignia

Air Force JROTC insignia

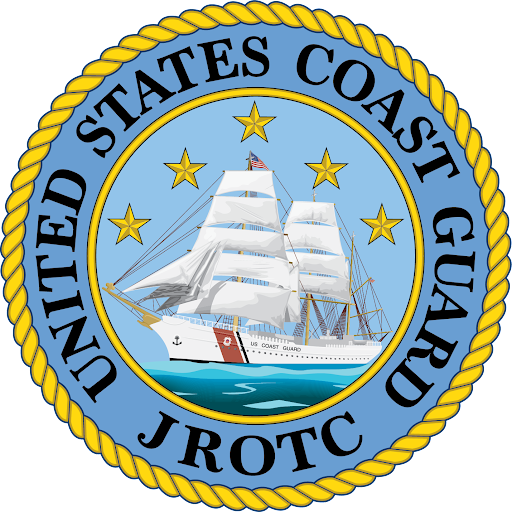
Coast Guard JROTC insignia

Six of the eight branches of the Uniformed services of the United States maintain a Junior Reserve Officers' Training Corps, organized into units. There are a total of 3,275 units:

- 1,744 Army Junior Reserve Officers’Training Corps (AJROTC) units
- 794 Air Force Junior Reserve Officers’Training Corps (AFJROTC) units
- 583 Navy Junior Reserve Officers Training Corps (NJROTC) units
- 260 Marine Corps Junior Reserve Officers’Training Corps (MCJROTC) units
- 10 Space Force Junior Reserve Officers Training Corps (SFJROTC) units
- 14 Coast Guard Junior Reserve Officers’Training Corps (CGJROTC) units

Prior to 1967 the number of units was limited to 1,200. The cap was increased to 1,600 units in 1967 and again to 3,500 units in 1992; the statutory limitation on the number of units was struck from the law in 2001. Their goal was to reach 3,500 units by February 2011 by encouraging program expansion into educationally and economically deprived areas.

Units are set up according to the layout of their parent service, often referred to as the "Chain of Command." Army JROTC units follow a company (usually the period the class is held in), battalion (all periods), and at larger events brigade (multiple battalions) structure. Marine Corps JROTC units follow the battalion, or in cases of larger size, brigade structure. Air Force JROTC units are composed structurally based on size. Individual if one, detail if 2, element if more than 2 and no more than 8, flight if 26, squadron if more than 51, group if more than 101, and wing if more than 251 cadets. Navy JROTC typically follows the company (100-149 cadets), battalion (150-299 cadets), or regiment (300+ cadets) structure depending on the size of the unit.

=== JROTC funding ===
JROTC is partly funded by the United States Department of Defense with an allocation in the military budget of about $340 million for the fiscal year 2007, of which about 68 million are personnel costs. The federal government subsidizes instructor salaries, cadet uniforms, equipment and textbooks. The instructors, usually retired military personnel, continue to receive retirement pay from the Federal government, but in addition, the schools pay the difference from what the instructors would receive if they were on active duty. The service concerned then reimburses the school for approximately one-half of the amount paid by the school to the instructor.

DoD Budget	FY 2007	FY 2008	FY 2009	FY2021
AJROTC	128,281	146,147	149,329	215,529
NJROTC	45,411	47,844	50,494	77,918
MCJROTC	17,423	16,996	17,740	35,012
AFJROTC	77,901	94,760	108,730	99,536
Total U.S. $1,000	269,016	305,747	323,293	427,995

Note: Space Force JROTC funding is included in Air Force JROTC.

=== Military staff and instructors ===
Although active duty officers may be assigned to JROTC, this is exceedingly rare, and is primarily limited to staff at the major command or sub-command headquarters overseeing each service's respective JROTC program or regional administrators overseeing a set number of individual units. Unlike the college/university ROTC program, which is an actual military officer training and accession track, the vast majority of JROTC instructors are retired from the sponsoring branch of the Armed Forces. In the Army JROTC program, the cadet unit at each school is directed by at least one retired commissioned officer (in the grade of Captain through Colonel) or a Warrant Officer (in the grade of WO1 through CW5) who is designated as the Senior Army Instructor, and who is assisted by at least one retired Non-Commissioned Officer in the grade of Staff Sergeant through Command Sergeant Major who is designated as an Army Instructor (AI). In certain situations, there may be additional instructors.

A new provision from the John Warner National Defense Authorization Act for Fiscal Year 2007 (Section 540) that was signed into law in October 2006 permits retired Reserve Component officers and noncommissioned officers to be hired as instructors.

There are no national requirements that JROTC instructors have the teaching credential required by other teachers in public high school, although there are a handful of counties that do require a teaching credential. In at least one jurisdiction (California), the government requires JROTC instructors to have at least four years of military experience and possess a high school diploma or equivalent. AJROTC instructors need to be within one year of retirement or retired from active military service for five or fewer years. MCJROTC instructors need to have graduated from high school, have at least 20 years of active military service and be physically qualified according to Marine Corps standards.

AFJROTC previously required a minimum of 20 years of active duty but has since been overridden by a provision in the John Warner National Defense Authorization Act for Fiscal Year 2007 (Section 540), signed into law in October 2006, permitting retired Reserve Component (e.g., Air Force Reserve and Air National Guard officers and noncommissioned officers) to be hired as instructors. Officer instructors need to have a minimum of a bachelor's degree, while a high school diploma or equivalent is sufficient for enlisted instructors.

For AJROTC the Non-commissioned Officer has to attain an associate degree (AA), with teaching credential, in order to be assigned an AI. To be assigned as a SAI the AJROTC Instructor has to hold a BA degree, with teaching credentials.

NJROTC also required a minimum of 20 years of active duty until it was overridden by a provision in the John Warner National Defense Authorization Act for Fiscal Year 2007 (Section 540), signed into law in October 2006, permitting retired Reserve Component personnel (e.g., U.S. Navy Reserve officers, chief petty officers and petty officers) to be hired as NJROTC instructors. The minimum education requirement for an enlisted Naval Science Instructor (NSI) is a high school diploma or equivalent, with a baccalaureate degree from an accredited college or university required for a commissioned officer to serves as a Senior Naval Science Instructor (SNSI). The Navy requires that JROTC instructors be employees of the school or school district and that they are accorded the same status as other school faculty members.

=== National Defense Cadet Corps ===
National Defense Cadet Corps (NDCC) offers similar programs as JROTC. NDCC units differ from JROTC in that they receive little or no financial support from the Armed Forces; uniforms, equipment, other materials and instructor salaries must normally be furnished by the school hosting an NDCC program. Except for the funding aspects, JROTC and NDCC programs are virtually identical, although the cadet corps is not limited by the federal statute that restricts JROTC to offering courses only for students in ninth through 12th grades. Per 2005, Chicago had 26 Middle School Cadet Corps enlisting more than 850 students.

== Instruction and activities ==
A Navy Junior ROTC recruiting video from the mid-2000s

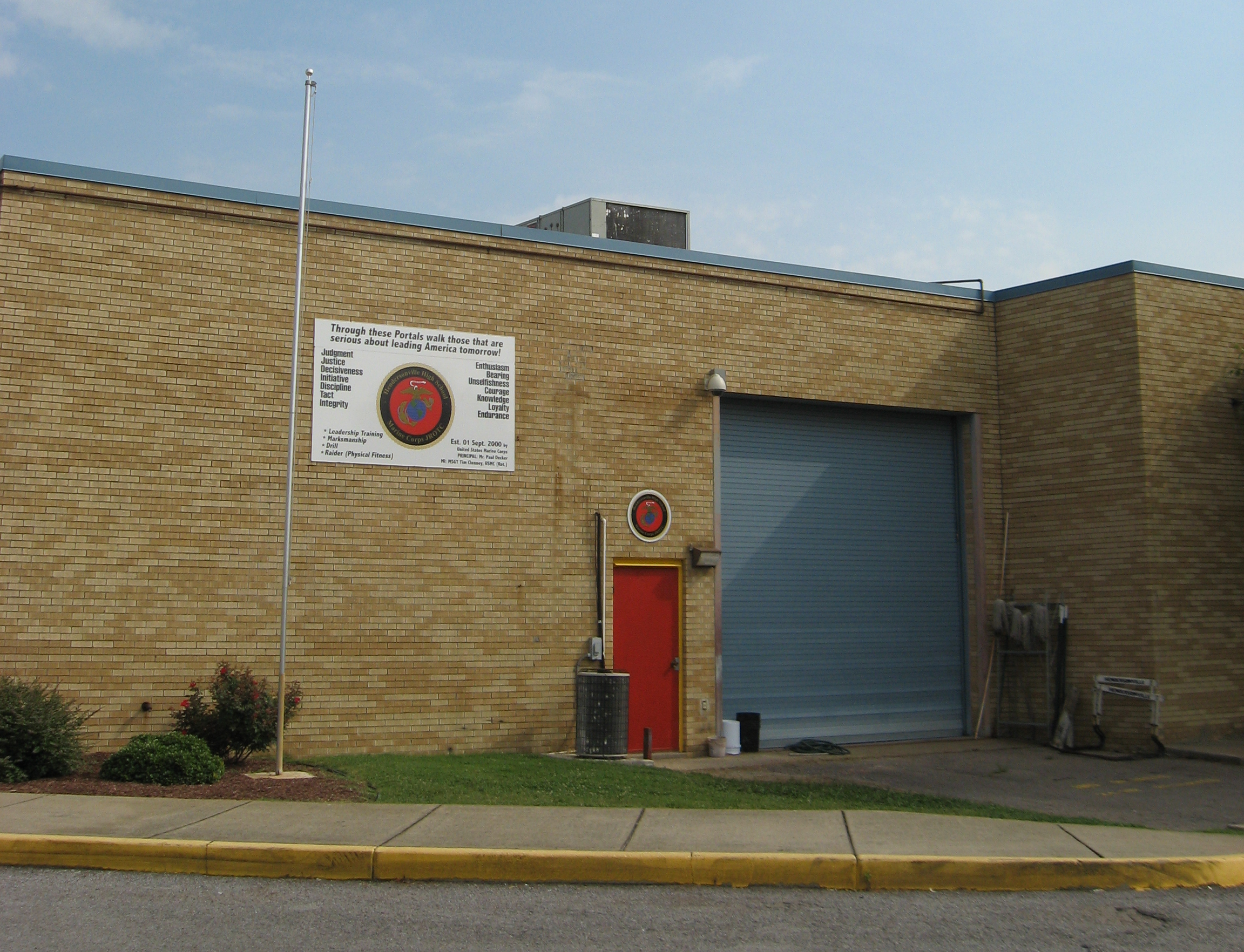
A Marine Corps JROTC unit in Hendersonville, Tennessee

The Code of Federal Regulations states that JROTC is "designed for physically fit citizens attending participating schools."

Boarding schools or (pre-college) military schools may offer JROTC programs, with some requiring participation as a condition for acceptance to the school. Some public military schools mandate JROTC as a class for all grade levels, and have a curriculum that includes military history, military protocol, civics, and physical fitness. Chicago has six public military academies, more than any other city and one-third of all in the country.

The JROTC program stresses military discipline, with a curriculum that emphasizes study of military science and military history. Cadets typically wear their uniforms once or twice a week, usually standing for inspection, with the exception being those cadets who attend a JROTC-based military academy. Their creed encourages conduct that brings credit to family, country, school and the corps of cadets, loyalty, citizenship and patriotism. Many cadets participate in extracurricular activities such as the following:

- Drill (unarmed, armed and regulation drill)
- Color Guard
- PT team or Raiders
- Rocketry (usually available in AFJROTC)
- Orienteering
- Rifle or pistol marksmanship programs (offered by at least two-thirds of JROTC units)
- Academic Team
- Drum corps
- Marching Band (although very rare)

The most notable JROTC marching band is the Virginia 91st Air Force Junior ROTC Band of the Randolph-Macon Academy. Being a rare part of a JROTC unit, there are few in existence, with the state of Texas only boasting two units with marching bands.

There are other extracurricular activities that the JROTC's programs provide for their cadets, including trips to military installations, ROTC college programs, and other sites that give the cadets a look at the military community. During the school year, there are regional competitions between JROTC units, with testing in all areas of military, naval and aerospace science. Some units organize special visits to US military bases during school breaks. There are also many summertime "leadership academies" for cadets hosted by various military installations. These academies include the JROTC Leadership and Academic Bowl (JLAB), and JROTC Cadet Leadership Challenge (JCLC), a physical fitness competition.

Cadets may be awarded ribbons, ribbon devices, medals and aiguillettes for participation in JROTC and team activities, as well as for personal academic and athletic achievement and leadership. Awards may be presented by organizations other than the cadet's JROTC program, such as other JROTC programs, Military Officers Association of America, American Veterans, Order of the Daedalians, American Legion, and the National Rifle Association of America. Ribbons and medals are positioned in order of precedence, as prescribed by the Cadet Field Manual and the senior JROTC instructor.

Successful completion of a JROTC Program (1–3 years of classes) can lead to advanced rank upon enlistment in the Armed Forces. For example, upon completion of three years of Air Force JROTC, cadets may at their instructor's discretion enlist in the Air Force at the rank of Airman First Class (E-3). However, JROTC participation incurs no obligation to join the military.

=== Competitions ===
==== Leadership and Academic Bowl ====
The JROTC Leadership and Academic Bowl (JLAB) is a national academic competition which is the largest of its kind for high schools in the country. There are three levels of the competition, which units who complete levels 1 and 2 successfully attending the last level at Catholic University of America in Washington D.C. Subjects that are covered in all three levels include history, literature, current events and JROTC curriculum. Depending on the represented branch, there may be 4-8 cadets representing a school.

==== National High School Drill Team Championship ====
Established in 1982, the National High School Drill Team Championship is a joint-service exhibition drill competition for JROTC drill teams, held in Daytona Beach, Florida. Although it has been held since 1982, it only became an officially service-based sanctioned event when the U.S. Army Cadet Command became the sponsor in 1988.

== Awards and decorations ==
=== Army Junior Reserve Officers Training Corps ===
Army JROTC Medal For Heroism Ribbon	Army JROTC Superior Cadet Ribbon	Army JROTC Distinguished Cadet Ribbon
Army JROTC Academic Excellence Ribbon	Army JROTC Academic Achievement Ribbon	Army JROTC Perfect Attendance Ribbon
Army JROTC Student Government Ribbon	Army JROTC Leadership Education Training Service Ribbon	Army JROTC N 1 7 Ribbon
Army JROTC N 1 8 Ribbon	Army JROTC N 1 9 Ribbon	Army JROTC N 1 10 Ribbon
Army JROTC Dai Sai Instructor Leadership Ribbon	Army JROTC Personal Appearance Ribbon	Army JROTC Proficiency Ribbon
Army JROTC Drill Team Ribbon	Army JROTC Orienteering Ribbon	Army JROTC Color Guard Ribbon
Army JROTC Rifle Team Ribbon	Army JROTC Adventure Training Ribbon	Army JROTC Commendation Ribbon
Army JROTC Good Conduct Ribbon	Army JROTC JCLC Participation Ribbon	Army JROTC N 3 12 Ribbon
Army JROTC N 3 13 Ribbon	Army JROTC N 3 14 Ribbon	Army JROTC N 3 15 Ribbon
Army JROTC Varsity Athletics Ribbon	Army JROTC Physical Fitness Ribbon	Army JROTC Athletics Ribbon
Army JROTC N 2 4 Ribbon	Army JROTC N 2 5 Ribbon	Army JROTC Parade Ribbon
Army JROTC Recruiting Ribbon	Army JROTC N 4 3 Ribbon	Army JROTC N 4 4 Ribbon
Army JROTC N 4 5 Ribbon	Army JROTC Service Learning Ribbon	Army JROTC Excellent Staff Performance Ribbon
Ribbons listed with an N # # designation are locally awarded ribbons and the senior instructor decides the criteria for each ribbon. This will vary from unit to unit.

Army JROTC Ribbon Devices
Bronze Oil Lamp	Signifies second award of a ribbon.
Silver Oil Lamp	Signifies third award of a ribbon.
Gold Oil Lamp	Signifies fourth award of a ribbon.

=== Navy Junior Reserve Officers Training Corps ===
Drone Wings
Service designation stars (three maximum)
Meritorious Achievement Ribbon	Distinguished Unit Ribbon	Distinguished Cadet Ribbon
Honor Cadet Ribbon	Cadet Achievement Ribbon	Unit Achievement Ribbon
Aptitude Ribbon	NS IV Outstanding Cadet Ribbon	NS III Outstanding Cadet Ribbon
NS II Outstanding Cadet Ribbon	NS I Outstanding Cadet Ribbon	Exemplary Conduct Ribbon
Exemplary Personal Appearance Ribbon	Physical Fitness Ribbon	Participation Ribbon
Unit Service Ribbon	Community Service Ribbon	Academic Team Ribbon
Drill Team Ribbon	Color Guard Ribbon	S.T.E.M. Ribbon
Marksmanship Team Ribbon	Orienteering Team Ribbon	Inter-Service Competition Ribbon
Recruiting Ribbon	Leadership Training Ribbon	Sea Cruise Ribbon
C.E.R.T Ribbon		

NAVY JROTC Ribbon Devices
Star Devices
Only 1 of any ribbon may be worn. No more than 8 awards are authorized.
Bronze Star	2nd and 3rd Awards
Silver Star	4th and 5th Awards
Gold Star	6th through 8th Awards
Lamp Devices (Honor Cadet Ribbon)
Bronze Oil Lamp	Signifies award as NS-1 cadet
Silver Oil Lamp	Signifies award as NS-2 cadet
Gold Oil Lamp	Signifies award as NS-3/4 cadet
Other Devices
Torch	Signifies membership in an academic team
Anchor Device	Signifies team leader or commander of the group the device is attached to.

=== Air and Space Forces Junior Reserve Officers Training Corps ===
Air Force JROTC Gold Valor Award	Air Force JROTC Silver Valor Award	Cadet Humanitarian Award
Silver Star Community Service with Excellence Award	Community Service with Excellence Award	Air Force Association Award
Daedalian Award	American Legion Scholastic Award	American Legion General Military Excellence Award
Reserve Officer's Association	Military Officers Association Award	Veterans of Foreign Wars Award
National Sojourners Award	Scottish Rite Southern Jurisdiction Award	Military Order of the Purple Heart
Sons of the American Revolution Award	Military Order of World Wars Medal	American Veterans Award
Air Force Sergeants Association	Tuskegee Airmen Inc. AFJROTC Cadet Award	The Retired Enlisted Association Award
Celebrate Freedom Foundation Award	Air Commando Association Award	Distinguished Unit Award with Merit
Distinguished Unit Award	Outstanding Organization Award	Outstanding Flight Award
Top Performer Award	Outstanding Cadet Award	Leadership Ribbon
Superior Performance Ribbon	Achievement Ribbon	Academic Ribbon
Leadership School Ribbon	Special Teams Competition	All Service National Competition Ribbon
Air Force Nationals Competition Ribbon	Orienteering Ribbon	Co-Curricular Activities Leadership Ribbon
Drill Team Ribbon	Color Guard Ribbon	Sabre Team Ribbon
Marksmanship Ribbon	Good Conduct Ribbon	Service Ribbon
Health and Wellness Ribbon	Recruiting Ribbon	Activities Ribbon
Attendance Ribbon	Dress and Appearance Ribbon	Longevity Ribbon
Bataan Death March Memorial Hike Ribbon	Patriotic Flag Ribbon	

Air & Space Force JROTC Ribbon Devices
Bronze Oak Leaf Cluster	1 additional award each
Silver Oak Leaf Cluster	5 additional awards each
Oak leaf clusters are given to represent additional awards just like in the USAF. Use this example.

=== Marine Corps Junior Reserve Officers Training Corps ===
Legion of Valor Cross For Achievement	Marine Corps Reserve Association Outstanding Unit	American Legion General Military Excellence
American Legion Scholastic Excellence Award	American Veterans	Daedalian Award
Military Officers Association	Military Order of the Purple Heart	Military Order of the World Wars
National Sojourners Medal	Navy League Youth Medal	Non-Commissioned Officers Association Award
Scottish Rite Southern Jurisdiction	Sons of the American Revolution	Daughters of the American Revolution Medal
Veterans of Foreign Wars Award	Women's Marines Association	Reserve Officers Association
Vietnam Veterans Association of America Award	Celebrate Freedom Foundation Ribbon	Marine Corps League Community Service
	Marine Corps League YPFT Award	
Outstanding Cadet	Student Leadership	Officer Leadership
Noncommissioned Officer Leadership	Civic Service	Distinguished Scholastic Achievement
National Marksmanship Award	Flight Academy Pilot Program	MCJROTC National Raider
Distinguished Military Training	Best Drill Cadet	Arts and Academics
Physical Achievement	MCJROTC Raider	Superior Marksman
Athletic Participation	Longevity	Distinguished Conduct
Best Drill Squad	Color Guard	Drill Team
Cyber Patriot	Band / Drum & Bugle Corps	Rifle Team
Orienteering Ribbon	Recruiting	

Marine Corps JROTC Ribbon Devices
Eagle Globe and Anchor Devices
Bronze EGA	2nd Award
Silver EGA	3rd Award
Gold EGA	4th Award
Lamp Devices (Academic / Athletic Ribbons)
Bronze Oil Lamp	2nd Award
Silver Oil Lamp	3rd Award
Gold Oil Lamp	4th Award
Bar Devices
Band	
Rifle Team	
Raider	
Drill Team	

=== Medals and Decorations of JROTC ===
Awards are not given in all JROTC programs or even all schools in any one program. Awards with a service name (i.e. Army) are only given in that branch. Unless otherwise stated all medals can only be received once.
Army JROTC Medal for Heroism	Army JROTC Superior Cadet Award	Air Force JROTC Gold Valor Award	Air Force JROTC Silver Valor Award	Air Force JROTC Humanitarian Award
To be awarded this decoration, cadets must distinguish themselves by acts of heroism. The act must: Result in an accomplishment so exceptional/outstanding as to set a cadet apart; Involve acceptance of danger or extraordinary responsibilities	To be awarded this decoration, the cadet must be in the top 10 percent of their JROTC class and in the top 50 percent of their academic class. Must show leadership in an academic, student or athletic organization. Demonstrate qualities of discipline, courtesy, and character.	Recognizes the most outstanding voluntary acts of self-sacrifice and personal bravery by a cadet involving conspicuous risk of life above and beyond the call of duty.	Awarded to a cadet for a voluntary act of heroism which does not meet the risk-of-life requirements of the Gold Valor Award.	Recognize cadets who provide aid in response to a singular extraordinary event such as a natural disaster or other catastrophe that has placed or has the potential to place a hardship on their fellow citizens. This award is not to be used to recognize day-to-day service in the community.
Air Commando Association	Air Force Association	Air Force Sergeants Association	American Legion General Military Excellence	American Legion Scholastic Excellence Award
Awarded annually at the SASI's discretion for completing a one-page essay based on a historical USAF Special Operations Mission possessing the 13 critical attributes of success: integrity, self-motivation, intelligence, self-discipline, perseverance, adaptability, maturity, judgment, selflessness, leadership, skilled, physical fitness and family strength.	This award is presented annually at each unit to the outstanding junior cadet. The award recipient must possess the following personal characteristics and eligibility criteria: Top 1% of the cadets in a unit in the following areas, academics, leadership, and professionalism; Positive attitude (toward AFJROTC and school); Outstanding personal appearance (uniform and grooming); Display personal attributes such as initiative, judgment, and self-confidence; Courteous demeanor (promptness, obedience, and respect for customs).	This award recognizes an outstanding junior cadet in a 4-year program who is in the top 10% of the AFJROTC class, and demonstrates outstanding qualities in military leadership, discipline, character, and citizenship.	This award is presented annually to one junior cadet based on the cadet's general military excellence. Each cadet must: Rank in the top 25% of their JROTC class; Demonstrate outstanding qualities in military leadership, discipline, character, and citizenship.	This award is presented annually to one junior cadet based on the cadet's overall scholastic achievements. Each cadet must: Rank in the top 10% of the high school class; Rank in the top 25% of their JROTC class; Demonstrate leadership qualities; Actively participate in student activities.
American Veterans	Army Recruiting Command Award	Association of the US Army Award	Daedalian Award	Daughters of the American Revolution Medal
This award is presented annually to one qualified cadet that possesses individual characteristics contributing to leadership such as: A positive attitude toward the JROTC programs and service in the military; Personal appearance (wearing of the uniform, posture, and grooming, but not physical characteristics per se); Personal attributes (initiative, dependability, judgment, and self-confidence); Officer potential (capacity for responsibility, adaptability, and maintenance of high personal standards); Obtained a grade of "A" (or the numerical equivalent) in their ROTC class; Be in good scholastic standing in all classes at the time of selection and at the time of presentation.	Awarded annually to one female and one male cadet. Be in the top 25% of the academic class. Demonstrated outstanding leadership traits and possess the potential for assuming positions of increased responsibility. Participate in integrated-curricular activities that foster both scholastic and military excellence. Demonstrate qualities of dependability and good character, respects military discipline and standards, and possesses a fundamental and patriotic understanding of the importance of JROTC training.	Be a leader in all aspects of leadership, not just by title or position. Be in good academic standing.	The Order of Daledalins is a fraternity of commissioned pilots from all military services. It is named after the legendary Daedalus,. This annual award recognizes one outstanding junior or senior cadet at each unit that meets the following criteria: Demonstrate an understanding and appreciation of patriotism, love of country, and service to the nation; Indicate the potential and desire to pursue a military career; rank in the top 10% of their JROTC class; rank in the top 20% of their school class.	This award is presented annually to one senior that meets the following criteria: rank in the top 25% of their JROTC class; Rank in the top 25% of their high school class; Demonstrate qualities of dependability and good character; Demonstrate adherence to military discipline; Possess leadership ability and a fundamental and patriotic understanding of the importance of JROTC training.
National Society of the Daughters of the American Colonists	Legion of Valor Cross For Achievement	Military Officers Association	Military Order of the Purple Heart	Military Order of the World Wars
The recipient must be in the first year of a four year JROTC program, show a high degree of patriotism to the United States of America and must have demonstrated a high degree of academic performance and leadership.	The Legion of Valor Bronze Cross for Achievement is awarded to JROTC cadets who exemplify the highest standards of leadership, scholarship and service. The Legion of Valor of the United States of America is composed of the nation's most decorated military heroes — recipients of the Medal of Honor, Distinguished Service Cross, Navy Cross and Air Force Cross.Cadets must rank in the top 5% of their JROTC unit, place academically in the top 15% of their class and demonstrate consistent leadership in and out of uniform. Candidates are nominated by their senior naval science instructors and evaluated through a competitive national selection process.	This award is presented annually to an outstanding junior cadet who shows exceptional potential for military leadership. Each cadet must: be in good academic standing; be of high moral character; Show a high order of loyalty to the unit, school, and country; Show exceptional potential for military leadership.	This award annually recognizes an outstanding underclassman (non-senior) who is enrolled in the JROTC program and demonstrates leadership ability. Each cadet must: Have a positive attitude toward JROTC and country; hold a leadership position in the cadet corps; be active in school and community affairs; attain a grade of "B" or better in all subjects for the previous semester.	This award is presented annually to an outstanding cadet who has committed to continue the JROTC program the following school year. Selection is based on outstanding accomplishments or service to the JROTC unit.
National Society United States Daughters of 1812	National Sojourners Medal	Navy League Youth Medal	Non-Commissioned Officers Association Award	Reserve Officers Association
Awarded annually, at the senior instructor's discretion, for academic excellence, leadership, military discipline, dependability, patriotism and upright character in speech and habits.	This award annually recognizes an outstanding junior. Each cadet must: Contribute the most to encourage Americanism by participation in leadership development activities or community projects; demonstrate academic excellence by being in the top 25% of class; demonstrate the qualities of dependability, good character, self-discipline, good citizenship and patriotism.	The award recognizes a high school junior in NJROTC or MCJROTC. The cadet must have a minimum 3.0 GPA in Naval Science, as well as a B overall academic average during the current school year. The cadet must have a grade of A in leadership, show active participation in extra-curricular activities, and reflect the highest standards in attitude, appearance, and conduct.	Exhibited the best military bearing. Displays superior personal appearance. Exemplifies leadership at all levels.	This award is presented annually for military and academic achievement to an outstanding senior. The recipient must possess individual characteristics contributing to leadership such as: be in the top 10% in the JROTC program; be in the top 25% in academic grades; Be recognized for having contributed the most to advancing the objectives of the JROTC program, which include outstanding dedication to citizenship, knowledge of civic responsibility, military orientation, self-discipline and a sound work ethic.
Scottish Rite Southern Jurisdiction	Sons of the American Revolution Sons of the American Revolution	Sons of Union Veterans of the American Civil War	The Retired Enlisted Association	Veterans of Foreign Wars
This award annually recognizes an outstanding underclassman (non-senior), who is enrolled in the JROTC program and demonstrates leadership ability. Each cadet must: Have a positive attitude toward JROTC and country; hold a leadership position in the cadet corps; be active in school and community affairs; attain a grade of "B" or better in all subjects for the previous semester.	This award recognizes an outstanding junior cadet who is enrolled in a JROTC program. The recipient must exhibit a high degree of leadership, military bearing, and all-around excellence in JROTC studies. Each cadet must: be currently enrolled in the JROTC program; Be in the top 10% of their JROTC class; be in the top 25% of their overall class.	The cadet must be recommended by their senior JROTC instructor, show a high degree of patriotism and academic performance as well as leadership.	Awarded annually, at the SASI's discretion, for exceptional leadership to the most outstanding AFJROTC cadet while serving in an Enlisted Rank. The selected enlisted cadet must have shown outstanding leadership throughout the course of the school year.	This award presented annually to an outstanding junior or senior who is actively engaged in the JROTC program and who possesses individual characteristics contributing to leadership. Each cadet must: Positive attitude toward the JROTC program; Must maintain a "B" average in JROTC curriculum and a "C" average in all remaining subjects with no failing grades in the previous semester; Active in at least one other student extracurricular activity (music, athletics, government, etc.)
Vietnam Veterans Association Medal				
This award is for second year cadets in the top 25% of their academic class and the top 25% of their JROTC class. The cadet should exemplify the core values of Advocacy, Meaningful Achievement, Integrity, Compassion and Camaraderie.				

== Notable members of JROTC ==
Many members of JROTC go on to have careers in the United States Armed Forces as they are twice as likely to enlist than other high school students. Some notable former members of JROTC include:

- William J. Bordelon, Central Catholic Marianist High School 1938, staff sergeant, U.S. Marine Corps, awarded the Medal of Honor
- James Cartwright, general, U.S. Marine Corps, Vice Chairman of the Joint Chiefs of Staff
- Harry B. Harris Jr., admiral, U.S. Navy; first Asian-American to achieve the rank of admiral in the Navy; served as commander of U.S. Pacific Command
- Shoshana Johnson, specialist, U.S. Army, first female African-American prisoner of war in the history of the United States military (medically retired)
- Baldomero Lopez, first lieutenant, U.S. Marine Corps, awarded the Medal of Honor
- Michael Ollis, U.S. Army staff sergeant, awarded the Medal of Honor.
- Emily Perez, Oxon Hill High School 2001, second lieutenant, U.S. Army; first Class of 9/11 West Point graduate to die in the Iraq War
- Alan G. Rogers, major, U.S. Army
- Thomas A. Schwartz, general, U.S. Army, United States Army Forces Commander, 1998-1999
- Charles D. "Ranger Dave" Sellers, major, U.S. Air Force & U.S. Army, Booker High School JROTC, 1986-1990
- Allen B. West, lieutenant colonel, U.S. Army and United States Representative from Florida, Henry Grady High School JROTC
- Thomas E. White, brigadier general, U.S. Army, Secretary of the Army, 2001–2003

== Controversy ==
There has been controversy about JROTC and militarism in schools. The American Friends Service Committee, the Central Committee for Conscientious Objectors (CCCO), Veterans for Peace, War Resisters League, and the Project on Youth and Nonmilitary Opportunities, actively oppose the JROTC for a number of reasons, including:

- High cost—A 1999 report by the American Friends Service Committee found that local school districts ended up paying substantially more than the cost estimate the military provided, and that a JROTC program cost more on a per-pupil basis than academic, non-military instruction.
- Lack of local control—The CCCO is concerned that the federal military dictates the JROTC curriculum and selects the instructors, resulting in local school districts losing control of curriculum and staff.
- Low-quality curriculum—The CCCO considers the JROTC textbooks to contain substandard learning material with factual distortions and outdated methods of teaching, basing their conclusions on a 1995 academic study of the Army JROTC curriculum commissioned by the American Friends Service Committee, which argues that the curriculum narrows the viewpoint of the students, encourages blind following rather than critical thinking, and indoctrinates students in militaristic authoritarian loyalty and passivity. Veterans for Peace resolved that JROTC teaching that the government gives the citizens its rights "is a complete perversion of the Constitution and the Declaration of Independence."

The Coalition For Alternatives to Militarism in Our Schools, formed by more than 50 teachers in the Los Angeles Unified School District, aims to "eliminate the Junior Reserves Officer Training Corps in our High Schools." Many cases of abuse by JROTC instructors, as well as credentialing issues, and of having students forced into JROTC due to lack of space in physical education classes have been noted in Los Angeles Public Schools. The group claims 2006 showed a reduction in JROTC enrollment in Los Angeles, with a drop of one-third or approximately 1,500 students, suggesting part of the explanation is efforts to stop the involuntary enrollment of students into JROTC. At Roosevelt High School in the Boyle Heights section of Los Angeles, a local campaign against JROTC cut the number of cadets 43 percent in four years, with a JROTC instructor reporting a 24 percent drop in enrollment from 2003–04 to 2006-07 for the rest of the Los Angeles unified School District.

In October 2005, the New York Civil Liberties Union pressured Hutchinson Central Technical High School in Buffalo, New York to release students from a mandatory JROTC program, arguing that the practice violates the State's Education Law, which provides that no child may be enrolled in JROTC without prior written parental consent.

In May 2008, the American Civil Liberties Union stated that JROTC violates the United Nations sponsored Convention on the Rights of the Child by targeting students as young as 14 for recruitment to the military. The United States has not ratified the convention, although it has ratified an optional protocol to the Convention on "the Rights of the Child on the Involvement of Children in Armed Conflict." However, recruiting is not an official goal of JROTC, as stated in United States Code pertaining to the program. Nor is it a stated goal in each of the individual service's JROTC program mission statements.

Sexual harassment and assault of JROTC cadets by instructors is reported to have occurred in the program, and some instructors have been criminally charged in relation to these crimes. Lack of oversight and the minimal training required for instructors have been cited as factors contributing to this problem. In 2023, Congress approved new rules that require the JROTC program to have increased oversight in the management and reporting of misconduct and sexual abuse allegations.

Some school districts in the U.S. have essentially mandated the JROTC program for high school programs, despite DoD guidelines requiring the program to be elective. These mandates affect students of racial minorities disproportionately.

== See also ==
- Junior Reserve Officers' Training Corps ranks
- Delaware Military Academy
- Reserve Officers' Training Corps
  - Army Reserve Officers' Training Corps
  - Naval Reserve Officer Training Corps (includes Marines)
  - Air Force Reserve Officer Training Corps (includes Guardians)
- Pershing Rifles
- Youth Challenge Program
- High school gun clubs and teams in the United States
- M1903 Springfield - Used to teach weapons handling and military drill procedures to the cadets within JROTC units.
- M1 Garand
- Cadets (youth program)
- Combined Cadet Force

=== Other similar U.S.-based organizations ===
Youth-based, non-JROTC organizations include:

- California Cadet Corps (CACC); First Program of its kind founded in 1911, precursor to the JROTC and other similar programs.
- New Jersey State Guard Cadet Corps (NJSG-CC)
- Task Force Torch
- United States Army Cadet Corps (formerly the American Cadet Alliance)
- Civil Air Patrol
- United States Naval Sea Cadet Corps
- Young Marines
- Middle School Cadet Corps
- Navy League Cadet Corps
- Knickerbocker Greys
- New York Military Academy (NYMA)

== Videos ==
- Atlanta Public Schools' JROTC Pass-in-Review
- Union HS Army JROTC Unarmed Regulation at Central Regional Drill Competition 2019
- North Salem HS JROTC Vanir Guard Color Guard @ The Nationals, 5 May 2017
- Joint Service Academic Bowl Championship
- Ozark High School JROTC Drill Team 2017
- Virginia 91st Air Force JROTC Band at Fall Family Day Parade 2015
- JROTC Spring Competition - Lincoln Drum Corps 2015
