= Superior Cadet Decoration Award =

American ROTC award

Superior Cadet Decoration
- Type: Medal
- Awarded for: "Demonstrated officer potential."
- Presented by: United States Army
- Eligibility: ROTC Cadets
- Status: Currently Awarded

Precedence
- Next (higher): Medal for Heroism

The Superior Cadet Decoration Award is the second highest Department of the Army medal awarded exclusively to Reserve Officers' Training Corps cadets. This award is presented annually to the most outstanding cadet within their respective ROTC program. As with other Department of the Army decorations, the award consists of a medal, ribbon, and lapel button with case, accompanied by DA Form 1773 ("Citation for the Superior Cadet Decoration Award") signed by the regimental commander on behalf of the Secretary of the Army. In the Army, this award is also known as the Superior Cadet Decoration and the Superior Cadet Medal.

== Criteria for award ==
To be awarded this decoration, a cadet must:

- Demonstrate the highest level of military leadership and officer potential within their respective program.
- Be a regularly enrolled ROTC cadet (MS IV cadets scheduled for midyear graduation are eligible for consideration).
- Rank in the upper 25% of both their academic class and ROTC program.
- Attain a score of 90% or higher on the Army Combat Fitness Test (ACFT).

== Design ==
The medal consists of a lamp, a sword, and a book. The lamp denotes the pursuit of knowledge, higher learning, and partnership of Army ROTC with American colleges and universities. The sword signifies the courage, gallantry, and self-sacrifice intrinsic to the profession of arms. On the reverse is inscribed: "Superior Cadet."

== Superior Junior Cadet Decoration Award ==
Superior Junior Cadet Decoration Award Medal

Superior Cadet Decoration Award Medal, Military School Division

There is also a Superior Junior Cadet Decoration Award with similar requirements issued to cadets in the Junior Reserve Officers' Training Corps and National Defense Cadet Corps. For the JROTC version, the only difference in appearance of the two awards is an inverse of the red and blue colors on the ribbon portion of the medal. Again for the NDCC version, the only design difference is the ribbon portion of the medal. Overlaying a gray background, there is a total of ten vertical red stripes, with five stripes on the left side and five stripes on the right side.

To be considered eligible for this award, an individual must be:

- A Junior ROTC or NDCC cadet
- In the top 10 percent of his or her class in Junior ROTC or NDCC academically and in the top 50 percent of his or her class in overall academic standing
- Recommended by the Senior Army Instructor and principal or head of the appropriate institution

== See also ==
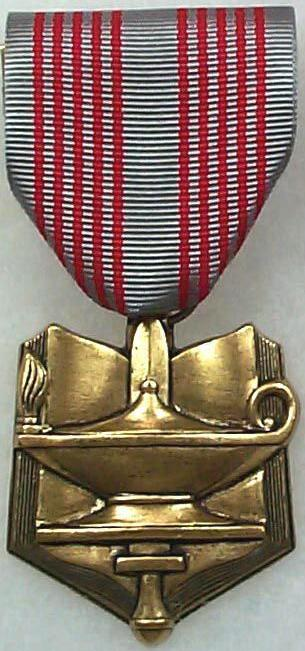
Superior Junior Cadet Decoration Award Medal (NDCC)

- Awards and decorations of the United States army
- Awards and decorations of the United States military
- List of military decorations
