= 2019 University of North Carolina at Charlotte shooting =

Mass shooting in North Carolina, U.S.

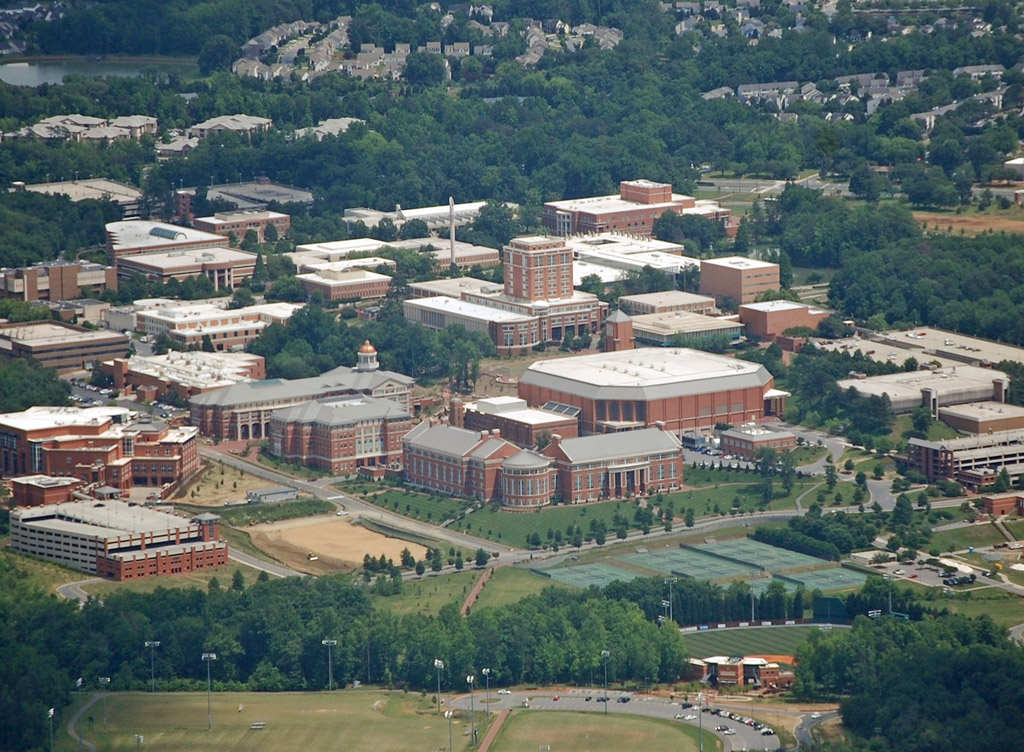
- An aerial view of the UNCC campus
- Location: 35°18′21.5″N 80°43′51.4″W; University of North Carolina at Charlotte; Charlotte, North Carolina, U.S.
- Date: April 30, 2019; 7 years ago 5:40 p.m (EDT)
- Target: Students at the University of North Carolina at Charlotte
- Attack type: School shooting, mass shooting
- Weapon: 9mm Glock 17 semi-automatic pistol
- Deaths: 2
- Injuries: 4
- Perpetrator: Trystan Andrew Terrell
- Defender: Riley Howell
- Motive: Avoidance of student debt
- Verdict: Guilty of two counts of first-degree murder
- Convictions: Two life sentences without parole

On April 30, 2019, a mass shooting occurred at the University of North Carolina at Charlotte, North Carolina, United States. The shooting, which occurred on the last day of classes for the spring semester, sent six people to the hospital, two of whom were dead upon arrival, and left three others in critical condition. The shooting occurred inside a classroom in the Woodford A. Kennedy Building while students were giving a final presentation. The perpetrator, a former UNCC student named Trystan Andrew Terrell, was arrested shortly afterwards. In September 2019, he pleaded guilty to the murders and was sentenced to life imprisonment without the possibility of parole.

== Events ==
The shooting occurred during the last day of classes for the spring semester, at around 5:40 p.m. EDT, according to university officials. Around that time, the gunman entered Room 236 in the Kennedy Building, where approximately 60 students enrolled in "Science, Technology, & Society," a liberal studies course on the anthropology and philosophy of science, were delivering their final group presentations. The classroom, with a level floor and 14 separate tables, was designed to accommodate approximately 100 students, and had both a front and a rear entrance, according to survivor Rami Al-Ramadhan, who had been seated towards the front of the room. The course instructor was anthropology professor Adam Johnson.

The first presentation began at around 5:33 p.m., with each group having been assigned to produce a 10-minute video on their chosen topic. According to Johnson, who had been seated at a table taking notes and who did not hear a door open, the gunman then "burst into" the classroom from the left of the room and opened fire with a pistol. According to Al-Ramadhan, the gunman opened the front door and smiled before firing his weapon at random, showing no other reaction. As the classroom emptied in panic, Johnson quickly moved towards the other door and held it open to allow his students to exit. Pausing to help a student who had fallen, he led some of his students to an anthropology department office in Barnard Hall, located to the east of the Kennedy Building. They barricaded themselves inside the office, after which the anthropology department chair called 911. Other students who escaped took shelter in Prospector Hall, to the north of Kennedy, while others sheltered in their vehicles or in their residences. As the gunman continued firing, student Riley Howell tackled him and knocked him to the floor while yelling "go, go, go!" to his classmates, according to Al-Ramadhan. Howell, whose actions gave other students time to escape the room without injury, was shot at least three times, with the final bullet, which killed him, entering his jawbone by his right ear and traveling into his brain. The gunman subsequently told police detectives that Howell's tackling him had caused him to stop firing. After the gunman had emptied his gun by discharging it a total of 17 times during the attack, he "...laid the gun down, and sat on the ground," according to Johnson. The gunman then responded to a victim who had asked him to stop shooting, stating "I'm done."

UNC Charlotte police logged the initial report of the shooting at 5:43 p.m. At 5:50 p.m., UNC Charlotte's Office of Emergency Management alerted students via Niner Alerts on Twitter, saying "Shots reported near Kennedy. Run, Hide, Fight. Secure yourself immediately." At the time the shooting was reported, UNC Charlotte police chief Jeff Baker and around 14 of his officers were reviewing security plans for a Waka Flocka Flame concert scheduled to be held on campus that evening; according to Baker, "when we heard this call come out we all converged [on the Kennedy Building] almost immediately." UNC Charlotte Police Sergeant Richard Gundacker was the first of the officers to enter the building. According to an affidavit submitted to a magistrate, Gundacker entered Room 236 and yelled to the survivors to identify the gunman, who then identified himself. Gundacker, who prior to joining the UNC Charlotte Police had retired from the New York City Police Department (1995–2015) in 2015 as a detective, was able to disarm the gunman, recovering the Glock pistol he had used along with multiple gun magazines in a black leather bag.

Charlotte Fire Department crews arrived on scene at 5:45 p.m. from nearby Fire Station 27 and immediately began caring for gunshot patients. More than 75 Charlotte Fire Department personnel converged on the scene in less than 15 minutes including more than 15 Special Tactical Unit (PAC) fire personnel. Ambulances from Mecklenburg EMS Agency (MEDIC) arrived on the scene by 5:55 p.m. along with additional law enforcement resources. The gunman was arrested by 5:44 p.m. Charlotte-Mecklenburg Police Department SWAT in conjunction with Charlotte Fire Department Special Tactical Units had secured buildings on campus by 6:35 p.m., with the suspected gunman identified as a male student at UNCC at 6:55 p.m. Governor Roy Cooper was briefed about the shooting by 7:11 p.m. By 7:30 p.m., the gunman, by then identified as Trystan A. Terrell, had been brought to the Charlotte-Mecklenburg Jail, with the CMPD declaring the campus secure at 7:40 p.m. UNC Charlotte remained on lockdown until around 10:51 p.m. UNC Charlotte Police Department, Charlotte-Mecklenburg Police Department, and Charlotte-Mecklenburg Office of Emergency Management established a family reunification center at the Harris Teeter in University City.

== Victims ==
List of casualties

Killed:
- Ellis Parlier (Midland, North Carolina)
- Riley Howell (Waynesville, North Carolina)

Wounded:

- Drew Pescaro (Apex, North Carolina)
- Rami Al-Ramadhan (Saihat, Saudi Arabia) (international student)
- Emily Houpt (Charlotte, North Carolina)
- Sean DeHart (Apex, North Carolina, formerly of Shelton, Connecticut)

There were six victims of the shooting, all current students. The two students who were killed were 19-year-old Ellis Parlier and 21-year-old Riley Howell. The others injured were 19-year-old Drew Pescaro, 20-year-old Sean DeHart, 20-year-old Rami Al-Ramadhan, and 23-year old Emily Houpt. The four wounded students were hospitalized, and three underwent surgery. Al-Ramadhan was hit by two bullets, one grazing an arm and another hitting his stomach; Pescaro was hit by a bullet that entered his back about an inch from his spine and pierced his abdomen, just missing his stomach and liver.

Parlier was from Midland and was a graduate of Central Academy of Technology and Arts. Howell was from Waynesville and was a graduate of T. C. Roberson High School, where he had run cross country and played on the soccer team. Howell was an environmental studies major at UNC Charlotte. Per his family, he dreamt of becoming a firefighter and put off military school for college. Al-Ramadhan is an international student from Saihat who is studying engineering. Al-Ramadhan's family in Saudi Arabia was notified of the shooting. DeHart graduated from Cardinal Gibbons Catholic High School in Raleigh. Pescaro, from Apex, is a graduate of Middle Creek High School in Cary, and is studying communications at UNC Charlotte. He is a sportswriter for the student newspaper, a video assistant for the football team, and co-host of the UNCC sports talk show Fans with Attitude. Houpt, a native of Charlotte, is a global studies major at UNC Charlotte and a former intern at The Worlds Affairs Council of Charlotte.

Howell, who was a Reserve Officer Training Corps cadet, was buried with full military honors and an honor guard on May 5. Over 1,000 people attended Howell's funeral at Lake Junaluska, near his hometown of Waynesville. Howell was also posthumously awarded the ROTC Medal for Heroism and the Congressional Medal of Honor Society's Citizen Honors Award, as well as a Purple Heart and a Bronze Star which were presented to his family. In December 2019, the publication Star Wars: The Rise of Skywalker - The Visual Dictionary included "Jedi Master and historian Ri-Lee Howell."

Chancellor Phillip Dubois said the university would award Howell and Parlier "degrees in memoriam" at the spring commencement, with a special presentation ceremony for Houpt, who was expected to recover sufficiently enough to personally attend.

== Perpetrator ==
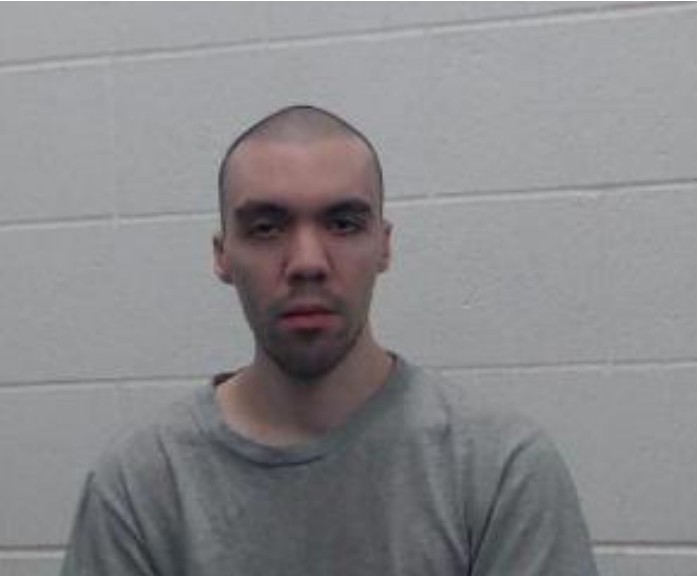
Mugshot of Terrell

Trystan Andrew Terrell (born June 6, 1996) is a former history undergraduate at UNC Charlotte who had withdrawn from the university on February 14, 2019. Born in Texas and a registered voter in Mecklenburg County, he had no prior criminal record in either North Carolina or in Texas. UNC Charlotte police said they had not noted him as a potential threat prior to the shooting. He was inactive on social media networks, and had legally purchased the handgun he allegedly used.

Terrell moved to North Carolina with his family in 2014, according to his grandfather Paul Rold of Arlington, Texas. He spent his high school years in a middle-class neighborhood in Mansfield, Texas, where he attended Mansfield High School. According to Rold, Terrell and his father Craig, who had taken a job as an auditor for the Charlotte city government, had moved to Charlotte for a fresh start and new surroundings. His mother Robyn Ann, who lived in Mansfield from 1999 until her death from breast cancer in December 2011, had worked as a paraprofessional educator with the Mansfield school district. Terrell's former neighbors said he was devastated by his mother's death, and that the family moved because Terrell wanted a change of scenery. He has an older sister who resides in Baltimore.

Rold described his grandson as autistic and socially reserved. He said Terrell dreamed of working in South America, and taught himself French and Portuguese with the aid of a language learning program Rold had bought for him. According to Rold, his grandson never showed any interest in firearms or other weapons, and that Terrell's actions were those of "someone foreign to me. This is not in his DNA." He further said his grandson was critical of American gun culture, saying it was too easy for people to obtain firearms in the United States, and that his grandson had specifically referenced New Zealand's crackdown on guns following the Christchurch mosque shootings. Rold described his grandson as "not bubbly and effervescent, rather shy, quiet, studious, not athletic," though he had tried to introduce his grandson to baseball and golf, with no success. Rold said he blamed lax gun laws for making firearms too easy to obtain, and that if his grandson "had not been able to secure a weapon, this would never have happened." He did not believe his grandson had a mental illness which would have disposed him to commit violence, "but then I’m not a psychologist. You would never have believed this could have happened, that he would have done something like this."

From the fall of 2015 through the spring of 2018, Terrell was enrolled at Central Piedmont Community College where he studied for an associate degree in science. Transferring to UNC Charlotte in the fall of 2018, he enrolled in three university courses for the 2019 spring semester, including Johnson's, and attended classes in the room where he committed the shooting. According to Johnson, between enrolling in and withdrawing from his course, Terrell "engaged with the course material" and "asked questions about the lessons, answered questions that I pose to the class. It was completely typical." Cooper Creech, a former classmate in the same course, said Terrell rarely spoke in the classroom, but would "blurt out statements" and sometimes seemed oddly angry. After Terrell left his course, Johnson said that he subsequently met him on campus and "conveyed that it was a shame that [he] had to leave the course", but that he understood the importance of students needing to prioritize. According to Johnson, that was his last encounter with him prior to the shooting. Nick Brooks, a student who was taking a study break outside the Kennedy Building when he saw Terrell enter, recognized him from commuting on the Lynx Blue Line light rail; Brooks heard the sound of gunshots seconds later. He further said he had encountered Terrell at his NoDa apartment complex outside the school, recalling "He was in the elevator and the doors were closing and he was just staring at me. You could tell something was up with him. It’s like he had no emotions." According to David Spano, the university's director of counseling and psychological services, though his office had a team to monitor "students of concern," Terrell had not been monitored at any point before he withdrew from the university.

=== Investigation ===
After being taken into custody, Terrell told reporters he "just went into a classroom and shot the guys". He then reportedly made a full confession to investigators, saying he had planned an attack for some months. In subsequent statements requesting search warrants from a court, lead investigator Detective Brian Koll of the CMPD wrote Terrell "stated he had been planning this shooting for several months and described to detectives where and how he obtained the firearm, research he had conducted on mass shootings, and how he chose this location." In his confession, Terrell reportedly referenced the Sandy Hook Elementary School shooting, which police sources said he had "researched" at length. According to the same sources, he had gone to a shooting range to practice and had "at least 10 magazines." Dressed in black, he took the light rail to campus on the day of the shooting, carrying a backpack; CMPD investigators intended to review available security footage along the line. Terrell told investigators that he had entered the Kennedy Building with the intention of shooting others; before attacking, he loaded his weapon in a restroom near the classroom. He reportedly chose his victims at random with no specific target intended. According to police search warrants, he informed investigators he had used his Samsung cell phone to record a video of the shooting.

Terrell was charged with two counts of murder, four counts of attempted first-degree murder, four counts of assault with a deadly weapon intending to kill, one count of having a gun on education property, and one count of discharging a firearm on education property. Police searched his third-floor apartment at the Novel NoDa apartment complex in the 400 block of E. 36th Street in NoDa around 8:00 p.m. on April 30., recovering a laptop, paper targets, three handgun magazines, six boxes of ammunition, and a magazine loader. As of May 1, investigators were unable to determine any motive for his actions, according to CMPD Police Chief Kerr Putney, who said investigators did not believe anyone else had been involved in the shooting.

=== Guilty plea and sentence ===
Terrell was formally indicted by a 16-member grand jury on May 6, 2019. On September 19, 2019, Terrell pleaded guilty to two counts of first-degree murder, four counts of attempted first degree murder and discharging a firearm on educational property; four assault charges were dropped.

In court, Terrell's defense attorneys testified Terrell had been experiencing stress from student debt and being unable to find employment, and that his autism had caused him to obsess and "panic" about his situation. Terrell had selected UNC Charlotte as he was familiar with the campus and was frustrated about being in debt to the university. Terrell apologized to the families of the victims, saying he had "made a mistake." As part of a plea bargain reached with the Mecklenburg County district attorney, he avoided the death penalty and was sentenced to two consecutive life sentences without the possibility of parole.

Terrell has since been moved to Central Prison.

== Aftermath ==
UNC Charlotte canceled all remaining scheduled university activities for the evening of April 30 and canceled all final examinations, which had been scheduled through Sunday, May 5. All other pending final exams and projects were made optional. In the wake of the shooting, the Waka Flocka Flame concert originally scheduled to take place at the Jerry Richardson Stadium on campus later that evening was canceled. On May 1, approximately 7,500 people attended an on-campus vigil. Many students sought on-campus counseling following the shooting, with university officials saying they were identifying local resources for students as they left campus for the summer holidays, and that they would continue to monitor students returning for the fall semester for any signs of trauma. Enhanced security measures were implemented for spring commencement ceremonies, including walk-through and handheld metal detectors and inspecting bags.

To honor the victims and survivors of the shooting, UNC Charlotte developed "Niner Nation Remembers," a permanent online memorial and archive. The university further formed a 14-member Remembrance Commission. Headed by Emily Zimmern, a past president and CEO of the Levine Museum of the New South, the Commission included faculty, staff, alumni, and student body representatives along with leaders in the greater Charlotte community, Reed Parlier's uncle, and two current members of the university staff and faculty who had been at Virginia Tech at the time of the 2007 shooting. Among the commission's objectives was deciding how best to memorialize the shooting and its victims, along with deciding the future of the Kennedy Building, which after the shooting and subsequent investigation was kept open for university personnel. According to Dubois, the commission would begin by seeking input from the victims' families, along with holding public sessions with the UNC Charlotte and the greater Charlotte community.

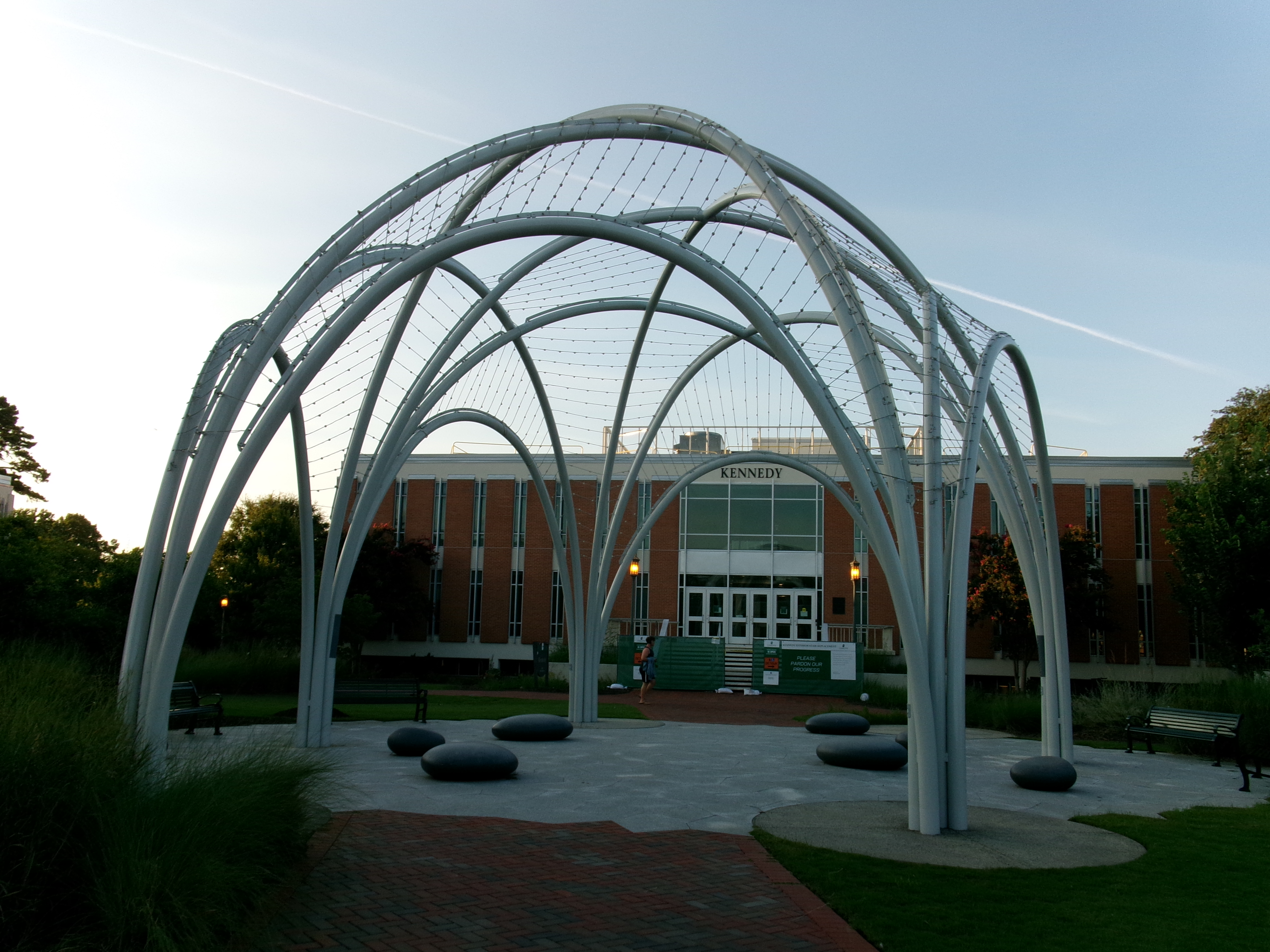
Constellation Garden, a memorial designed in remembrance of the shooting

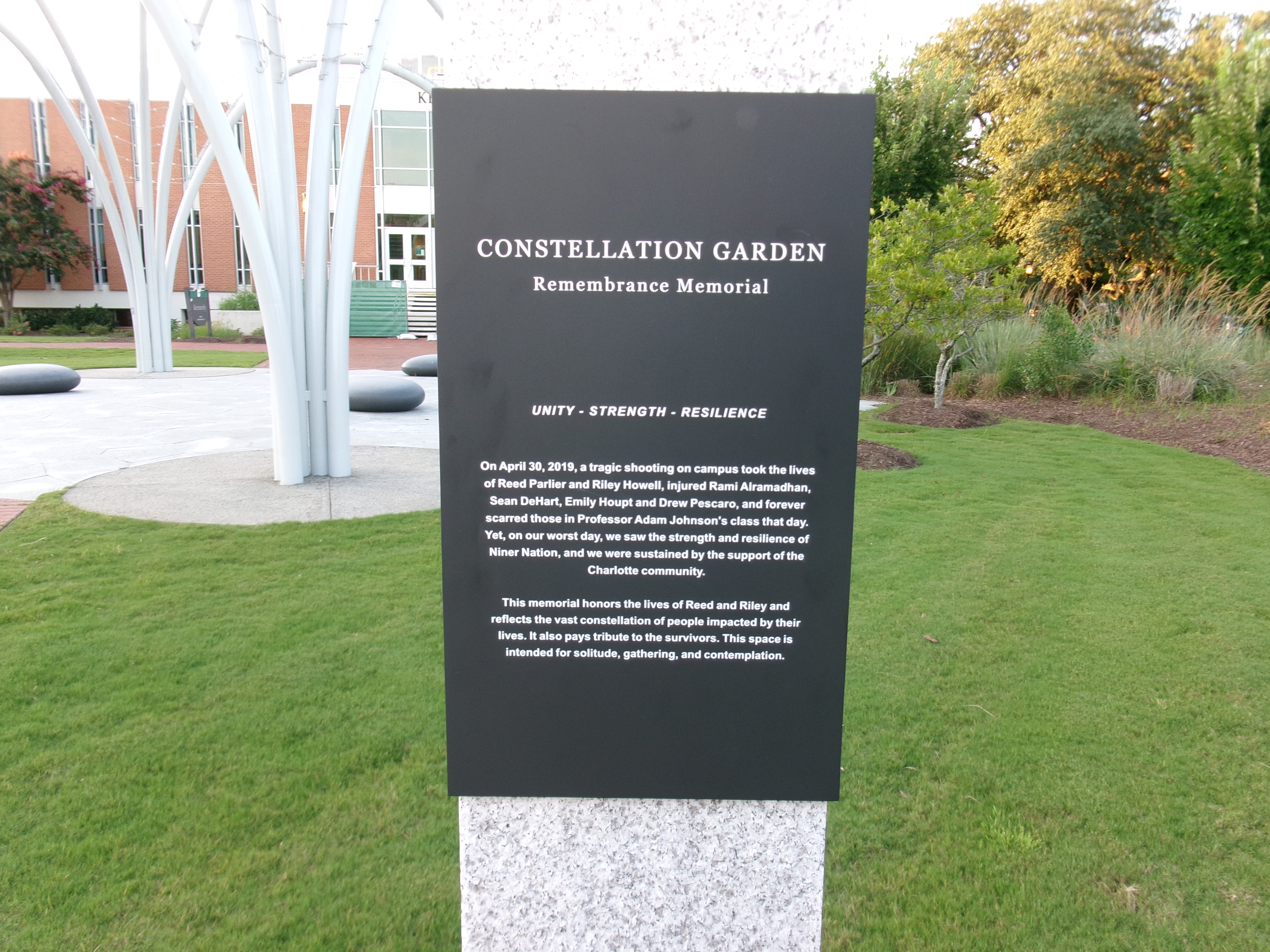
Plaque commemorating the lives lost and injured in the shooting

At the graduation following the shooting, the UNCC Commencement Brass Band played a section of Frank Ticheli's "An American Elegy," a piece written about the Columbine High School Shooting. The two students who were killed received honorary diplomas.

On May 7, a group of UNC Charlotte students presented a list of demands at a meeting of the Mecklenburg County Board of Commissioners, which included the implementation of a “school exit program” for students who drop out of Charlotte-Mecklenburg high schools, including exit interviews and job assistance. The group also called for a county-wide task force dedicated to studying and preventing gun violence, local government investment in gun violence research, and changes to gun laws, such as limits placed on ammunition purchased at one time. The Remembrance Commission held its first meeting on May 29, and Dubois announced the following day that Kennedy 236, where the shooting had occurred, would "not be used for any purpose" in the 2019–20 academic year; its long-term future would be decided at a later date after recommendations from the Remembrance Commission. Dubois further said additional safety training would be offered in the fall 2019 semester, and that the university's internal review on the shooting was "well underway," along with plans for an external review.

=== Response ===
North Carolina Governor Roy Cooper ordered that all North Carolina flags at state buildings and facilities be lowered to half-staff through sunset on May 3, 2019, in honor of the victims.

Charlotte Mayor Vi Lyles stated on Twitter, "My thoughts are with the families of those who lost their lives, those injured, the entire UNCC community and the courageous first responders who sprang into action to help others."

The Roman Catholic Diocese of Charlotte announced that prayer services honoring the victims would be held at St. Thomas Aquinas Church and St. Gabriel Church. St. Thomas Aquinas Church donated 1,700 candles for the campus vigil.

On May 20, one of the victims of the shooting, Riley Howell, who had died from his wounds sustained while tackling the shooter, was given a tribute by LucasFilm. As an avid fan with deep knowledge of the Star Wars lore, he was re-imagined in canon as a Star Wars character, referenced as Jedi Master and historian Ri-Lee Howell in the visual dictionary for The Rise of Skywalker film. The book credits "Ri-Lee Howell" with collecting "many of the earliest accounts of exploration and codifications of The Force."

== See also ==
- Gun violence in the United States
- List of mass shootings in the United States in 2019
- List of school-related attacks
- List of school shootings in the United States
- List of school shootings in the United States by death toll
