= National Defense Cadet Corps =

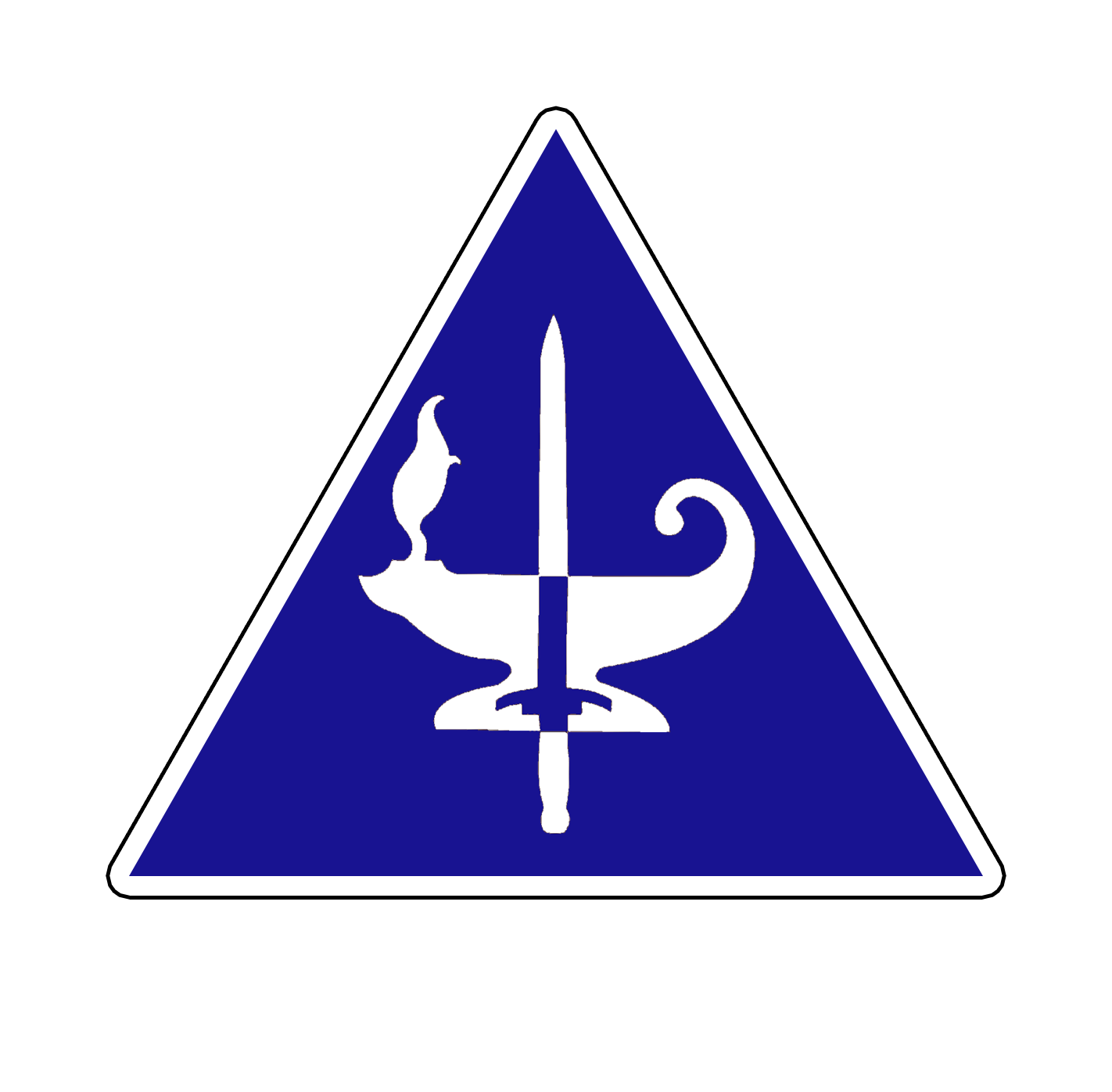
National Defense Cadet Corps

In the United States, the National Defense Cadet Corps (NDCC) was the forerunner to the current Junior Reserve Officers' Training Corps (JROTC) program and is essentially identical to it with just one exception: The NDCC is funded internally by the schools that opt for a military training system like JROTC but without any financial assistance from the Department of Defense. Therefore, the schools bear all costs associated with the program, including military instructor salaries, uniforms, training materials, and any other program expenses. As of 2012, there were three remaining US Army NDCC units in the United States. The US Navy began its program in April 2011. The US Marine Corps and the US Air Force also operate NDCC programs.

== History ==
The NDCC program provides schools that do not qualify for a JROTC unit an opportunity to provide a similar program. JROTC units are designed to "expand students' opportunities to gain the values of citizenship, service to the United States, personal responsibility, and a sense of accomplishment."

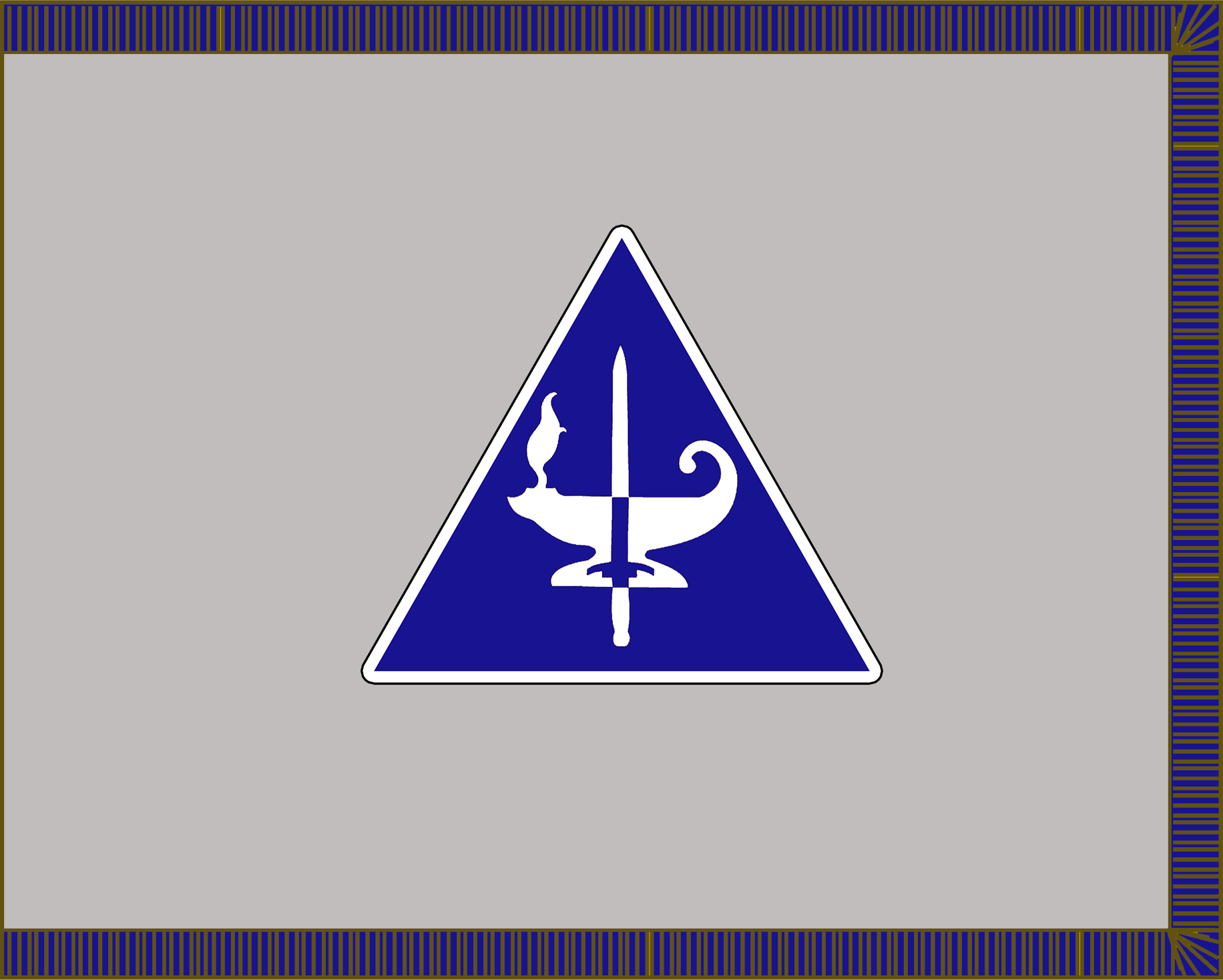
National Defense Cadet Corps Flag

Like JROTC, the Army NDCC was founded following the National Defense Act of 1916. The National Defense Act of 1916 authorized Senior ROTC for colleges and universities and Junior ROTC for high schools. The Army is to supply uniforms, equipment, and instructors (active duty members for colleges and active or retired members for high schools). At the time, JROTC graduates earned a certificate making them eligible to receive a commission in the Army Reserve at age 21.

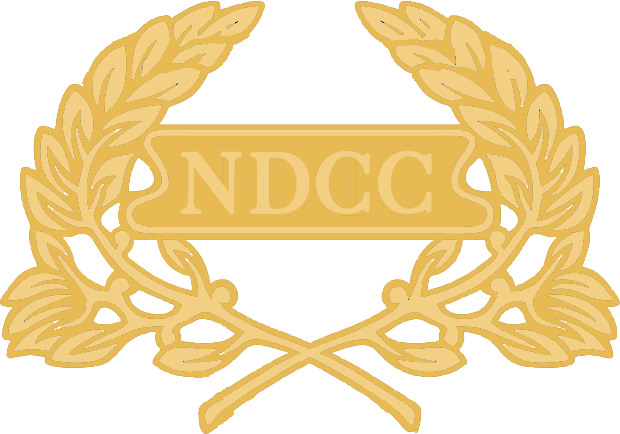
NDCC Cadet Cap Insignia

The National Defense Cadet Corps eventually became a rival to JROTC; unlike JROTC which is funded by the federal government, individual schools pay all of the costs incurred by their NDCC program. Following World War II, when peacetime funding had become tight, JROTC suffered from lack of support. In 1963, the Secretary of Defense cut JROTC funding even further and converted some JROTC units to the older, cheaper NDCC. Lawmakers, however, rose to the defense of the JROTC and Congress passed the ROTC Vitalization Act of 1964. Soon afterward, the number of NDCC units rapidly declined.

Until recently, Federal law authorized the Secretary of the Army to "issue arms, tentage, and equipment that he considers necessary for proper military training, to any educational institution at which no unit of the Reserve Officers' Training Corps is maintained, but which has a course in military training prescribed by the Secretary and which has at least 100 physically fit students over 14 years of age." Other laws gave the Secretary of the Navy and the Secretary of the Air Force similar authorization, but with different standards. As of 2012, the previous laws were rescinded and the requirements for all NDCC branches (Army, Marine, Navy, and Air Force) became standardized.

The statute establishing the Navy NDCC (NNDCC) was enacted in 2008.

== Operation ==
As with JROTC units, the U.S. military prescribes the curriculum and materials for instructor and cadet use, as well as legal forms and other supplies that meet regulations required to successfully administer the program. Schools hosting an NDCC unit must comply with statutory and regulatory guidance, just as regular JROTC units must. Unlike JROTC instructors, instructors for NDCC programs may be retired or current members of the Reserves (JROTC instructors must be on active duty or retired).

== Eligibility ==
To be considered for an NDCC unit, the school must be accredited by a United States nationally recognized accrediting agency or be accredited by a state, state educational agency, or state university. The Army NDCC program requires at least 150 students in grade 9 or higher (in the past, 100 students) and the Navy NDCC program requires at least 50 students over 14 years of age.
