= Marine Environmental Data and Information Network =

United Kingdom organization created to curate marine environmental data

The Marine Environmental Data and Information Network (MEDIN) is a United Kingdom organization created to curate marine environmental data. It is overseen by the UK government's Marine Science Co-ordination Committee.
