= Marine Science Co-ordination Committee =

UK government committee

The Marine Science Co-ordination Committee (MSCC) is a UK government committee composed of representatives from publicly-funded bodies who have a remit to undertake marine scientific research. There are also three non-executive members. The role of the MSCC is to implement the pan-UK Marine Science Strategy, which covers the period 2010-2025. The secretariat for the MSCC is hosted by the Department of Environment, Food and Rural Affairs (Defra) and the Natural Environment Research Council's National Oceanography Centre.

The committee usually meets twice per year and was formed in 2008 in response to the recommendations of the House of Commons Select Committee Report 'Investigating the Oceans', and replaces the Inter-Agency Committee on Marine Science and Technology (IACMST).

The Marine Science Co-ordination Committee's work is overseen by a Ministerial Marine Science Group, representing UK and Devolved Governments.

The MSCC also has oversight of the Marine Environmental Data and Information Network (MEDIN) and the UK Underwater Sound Forum.
