= Medin (name) =

Medin may refer to the following people:

== Given name ==
- Medin Zhega, Albanian football striker

== Surname ==
- Douglas Medin (born 1944), American psychologist
- Gastone Medin (1905–1973), Italian art director
- Joakim Medin (born 1984), Swedish journalist and writer
- Karl Oskar Medin (1847–1927), Swedish pediatrician
- Mykola Medin (born 1972), Ukrainian football coach and a former player
- Tomo Medin (1725-1788), Montenegrin author and adventurer

== See also ==
- Medina (surname)
- Jānis Mediņš (1890–1966), Latvian composer
