= ROTC Medal for Heroism =

- Type: Medal
- Awarded for: "ROTC cadets who distinguish themselves by acts of heroism performed on or off campus. Act must result in accomplishment so exceptional / outstanding as to set cadet apart from others in similar circumstances and must involve acceptance of danger or extraordinary responsibilities exemplifying praiseworthy fortitude and courage."
- Presented by: United States Army
- Eligibility: ROTC Cadets
- Status: Currently Awarded
- ROTC Medal for Heroism Ribbon

Precedence
- Next (lower): Superior Cadet Decoration Award

The ROTC Medal for Heroism is the highest United States Department of the Army medal awarded exclusively to Army Reserve Officers' Training Corps cadets. This award is presented to cadets who perform acts of heroism. As with other Department of the Army decorations, the award consists of a medal and ribbon, accompanied by DA Form 638. In the Army, this award is also known as the Medal of Heroism.

== Criteria for award ==
To be awarded this decoration, cadets must distinguish themselves by acts of heroism. The act must:

- Result in an accomplishment so exceptional/outstanding as to set a cadet apart
- Involve acceptance of danger or extraordinary responsibilities

The Soldier's Medal is an authorized award in place of the Medal for Heroism for acts of heroism performed at Cadet Troop Leader Training.

== Other persons eligible ==
Junior Reserve Officers' Training Corps cadets are also eligible for this award.

== Notable recipients ==
- Alaina Petty, Martin Duque, and Peter Wang, victims of the Stoneman Douglas High School shooting
- Riley Howell, victim of the 2019 University of North Carolina at Charlotte shooting
- Kaheem Bailey-Taylor, On Aug. 17, 2022, Bailey-Taylor was outside of a home on N. Bonsall Street in North Philadelphia, Pennsylvania when gunshots rang out. Without hesitation, Bailey-Taylor ran inside the house to find that multiple people had been shot. He helped one of the most seriously wounded victims and a fellow cadet get into a police car and stayed by their side. Bailey-Taylor is set to graduate from The Philadelphia Military Academy in 2024.
- Cadet Captain and Executive Officer Jeffrey Lannen, for safely leading fellow cadets to safety and displaying exemplary leadership during an on-campus race riot that involved gunfire at Grant Union High School JROTC in North Sacramento, California, in 1998.

== See also ==
- Awards and decorations of the United States army
- Awards and decorations of the United States military
- List of military decorations
