= Middle School Cadet Corps =

School cadet programs in the United States

The Middle School Cadet Corps (MSCC) are cadet programs for middle school students in the United States. Per 2005, Chicago had 26 Middle School Cadet Corps enlisting more than 850 children, overseen by the JROTC program. Students from the age of 11 can participate in the program, or younger if they have older siblings in the program.

== List of MSCCs ==
- California Cadet Corps - includes students in the middle school and elementary grades.
- Navy League Cadet Corps (NLCC)
- Young Marines
- Civil Air Patrol
- Leadership Officers Training Corps (LOTC)

=== NLCC ===
The NLCC (Navy League Cadet Corps) is a MSCC for youths between the ages of 11 and 13 under the United States Naval Sea Cadet Corps and the Navy League of the United States.

=== LOTC ===
A supporting organization known as the Leadership Officers Training Corps (LOTC) also exists as a middle school analog to JROTC that began in Texas. The first program was created in April 1995 at Alice Johnson Junior High in Channelview under the direction of Colonel Chester T. Churrin. The program spread throughout the Houston metro area and then the state of Texas. In 2023, the program moved to Alabama with 7 units in the Mobile County School System. Today over 1,700 students are enrolled in the program throughout Texas.

LOTC, like NDCC programs, does not receive federal funding. Because LOTC is self-funded, uniforms range from polo shirts to out of use khaki uniforms to various camouflage pattern uniform pieces. The insignia also usually follows Army JRTOC, but can come from whatever source the school chooses.

In Texas, at least two bills have been filed in the Legislature to make LOTC courses qualify as Career and Technical Education (CTE) credits, Texas H.B. 651 in 2023 and Texas H.B. 1079 in 2025. Neither bill made it out of committee.

LOTC instructors are former military service members from the grades of E-6 to O-6 who are retired, reserve, National Guard who possess at least an associates degree. The program is considered to be a part of the Career and Technical Education and can also count as a Physical Education credit. The program focuses on citizenship, leadership development, community service, teamwork, physical fitness, military customs and courtesies, and organizational management using a "learning by doing" approach.

LOTC cadets can participate in drill meets, color guard, parades, summer camp, STEM team, robotics team, cyber team and first aid meets.

==== LOTC Honor Code ====
I am an LOTC cadet. I will always conduct myself to bring credit to my family, community, school and the LOTC Corps. I will always tell the truth no matter what the consequences are.

I do not lie, cheat or steal and will always be accountable for my actions and deeds.

I will respect the dignity personal property and privacy of my fellow cadets. I will report any violations of the cadet Creed, school policies, or other wrongdoing to my LOTC instructor or proper authority.

I will always practice good citizenship and patriotism I am the future of the United States of America.

== See also ==
- Junior Reserve Officers' Training Corps
- Public military schools in the United States
