= William P. Acker =

United States Air Force general

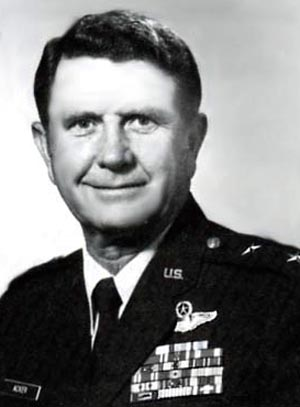
- Major General William P. Acker
- Born: October 22, 1930; Chattanooga, Tennessee, U.S.
- Died: July 24, 2018 (aged 87)
- Military career
- Allegiance: United States of America
- Branch: United States Air Force
- Service years: 1952–1985
- Rank: Major general
- Commands: 4515th Combat Crew Training Squadron; 497th Tactical Fighter Squadron; 401st Tactical Fighter Wing; 49th Tactical Fighter Wing; 432d Tactical Reconnaissance Wing; U.S. Military Enlistment Processing Command; Air Training Command; Third Air Force
- Conflicts: Korean War; Vietnam War
- Awards: See below

Major General William Preston Acker (October 22, 1930 – July 24, 2018) was a major general in the United States Air Force and educator.

== Biography ==
Acker was born in Chattanooga, Tennessee, in 1930 and graduated from high school in Greenville, South Carolina, after attending Georgia Military College prep school in Milledgeville, Georgia, for two years. In 1952 he received a bachelor's degree in business administration from the University of Georgia and was commissioned a second lieutenant through the Air Force Reserve Officers' Training Corps program. The General earned a master's degree in management from Arizona State University in 1959. He completed the Armed Forces Staff College, Norfolk, Va., in 1967; Air War College, Maxwell Air Force Base, Alabama, in 1971; and the six-week Harvard University advanced management Program in 1973.

== Career ==
In June 1952 the General entered pilot training at Bartow Air Force Base, Florida. His first operational assignment was as an F-84 fighter pilot with the 310th Fighter-Bomber Squadron at Taegu Air Base, South Korea, in February 1954. He completed transition training for F-100s and served as a flight commander and instructor for the 4515th Combat Crew Training Squadron at Luke Air Force Base, Arizona, from April 1957 until the end of 1960, when he moved to the 44th Tactical Fighter Squadron at Kadena Air Base, Okinawa.

He transferred to MacDill Air Force Base, Florida, in January 1963 and was selected to be in the initial cadre of the Air Force F-4 program. When the unit moved to Davis-Monthan Air Force Base, Arizona, in August 1964, General Acker became a squadron operations officer and later director of operations and training for the 4453rd Combat Crew Training Wing.

After completing the Armed Forces Staff College in September 1967, he moved to Southeast Asia as flight commander and operations officer with the 497th Tactical Fighter Squadron at Ubon Royal Thai Air Force Base, Thailand. While there he flew 100 missions over North Vietnam.

His next assignment was as chief of the Tactical Training and Standardization Branch at Headquarters United States Air Forces in Europe, Lindsey Air Station, Germany, from August 1968 to July 1969. The General then transferred to the 401st Tactical Fighter Wing at Torrejón Air Base, Spain, where he was assistant deputy commander for operations and assisted in the conversion from F-100s to F-4s.

In August 1970 he returned to the United States to enter the Air War College. Graduating in May 1971, he became chief of the Officer Management Division, Directorate of Personnel Resources, Air Force Military Personnel Center, Randolph Air Force Base, Texas. After attending Harvard University's six-week advanced management program in June 1973, General Acker was appointed vice commander of the 49th Tactical Fighter Wing, Holloman Air Force Base, New Mexico

Returning to Thailand in March 1974, he assumed command of the 432d Tactical Reconnaissance Wing (redesignated 432nd Tactical Fighter Wing) at Udorn Royal Thai Air Force Base. In this assignment he commanded a wing with 6,000 people, four F-4 fighter squadrons and one reconnaissance squadron. General Acker returned to the Air Force Military Personnel Center in April 1975 as vice commander.

From March 1976 to February 1978, he was deputy commanding general, U.S. Military Enlistment Processing Command, Fort Sheridan, Illinois. He then became commander of the U.S. Air Force Recruiting Service and deputy chief of staff, recruiting, Headquarters Air Training Command at Randolph Air Force Base. In March 1979 General Acker took command of the Air Force Military Training Center, Lackland Air Force Base, Texas, and in July 1981 returned to Randolph Air Force Base, as vice commander of Air Training Command. Acker assumed command of the Third Air Force in 1983 before retiring in 1985. Following is retirement from the Air Force he served as the 19th President of Georgia Military College from 1985–1992.

== Flight information ==
Rating: Command pilot
Flight hours: 5,000 hours
Aircraft flown: F-84, F-100, F-4
Pilot wings from: Bartow Air Force Base, Florida

== Awards and decorations ==
| US Air Force Command Pilot Badge |

Personal decorations
| | Air Force Distinguished Service Medal |
| | Defense Superior Service Medal |
| Width-44 crimson ribbon with a pair of width-2 white stripes on the edges | Legion of Merit |
| | Distinguished Flying Cross with bronze oak leaf cluster |
| Width-44 crimson ribbon with two width-8 white stripes at distance 4 from the edges. | Meritorious Service Medal |
| | Air Medal with two silver oak leaf clusters |
| | Air Force Commendation Medal with bronze oak leaf cluster |
| | Air Force Organizational Excellence Award |
Service awards
| | Combat Readiness Medal |
Campaign and service medals
| Width=44 scarlet ribbon with a central width-4 golden yellow stripe, flanked by pairs of width-1 scarlet, white, Old Glory blue, and white stripes | National Defense Service Medal with bronze service star |
| | Armed Forces Expeditionary Medal |
| | Vietnam Service Medal with two bronze service stars |
Service, training, and marksmanship awards
| | Air Force Longevity Service Award with silver and two bronze oak leaf clusters |
| | Small Arms Expert Marksmanship Ribbon |
Foreign awards
| | Vietnam Gallantry Cross |
| | United Nations Service Medal for Korea |
| | Vietnam Campaign Medal |

== Effective dates of promotion ==
Promotions
| Insignia | Rank | Date |
|---|---|---|
| | Major general | July 1, 1975 |
