= Churchill Newcomb =

American journalist

John Churchill Newcomb (1899–1962) was a journalist, an equestrian, and a farmer. Newcomb served as an editor and writer of feature articles for magazines. He also raced horses in Kentucky and Virginia, and he owned farmland in Loudoun County, Virginia, United States.

== Early life and education ==
Newcomb was born to Herman Danforth Newcomb and Matilda Churchill Newcomb in Jefferson County, Kentucky on December 3, 1899. Herman Newcomb served in the Kentucky General Assembly as a member of the Kentucky House (1904–1909) and Senate (1909–1913). After growing up in Louisville, Kentucky, Newcomb graduated from the Morristown School (now Morristown-Beard School) in Morristown, New Jersey in 1918.

Newcomb's classmates at the Morristown School included theatre critic John Mason Brown (a second cousin of Newcomb). Newcomb, Brown, and other family members regularly performed together in attic plays during summers at the Newcomb family farm. In 1913, Newcomb mailed a photograph to St. Nicholas magazine, a children's magazine, that made the Roll of Honor. A year later, the magazine published his letter to the editor in its "Because We Want To Know" section. The letter asked the magazine editors whether fires burned more brightly in cold weather than warm weather. After graduating from high school, Newcomb completed training with the Harvard Officer's Training Corps in 1918.

He later completed a bachelor's degree in journalism at Harvard University in Cambridge, Massachusetts in 1923. During his studies at the university, Newcomb served on the Editorial Board of The Harvard Lampoon, a humor magazine, and on the entertainment committee for his class committee. Newcomb served as the 1923 crew team's assistant manager, and he served as the Morristown Club's secretary-treasurer. He also participated in the Hasty Pudding Club.

== Horse racing and farming activities ==
Newcomb's mother Matilda belonged to the Churchill family in Kentucky connected to horse racing. Newcomb was the great-grandnephew of John Churchill and William Henry Churchill who donated the land for Churchill Downs, the home of the Kentucky Derby. Engaging in the family pastime, Newcomb attended horse shows. In 1928, he attended a breakfast of notables at the National Horse Show at Madison Square Garden that featured Governor Al Smith as the guest of honor.

Newcomb also owned a chestnut mare named Friskie that he raced in horse racing events in Kentucky and Virginia. In 1928, Friskie won the hunter trophy at the Orange Horse Show in Orange, Virginia. Friskie also captured the first leg on a challenge cup race in Charlottesville, Virginia that year. In 1931, Friskie rode to victory in a mile and a half steeplechase event in Lexington, Kentucky.

After graduating college, Newcomb lived on the family farm in Greenwood, Albemarle County, Virginia. He later acquired land to run a farm near Purcellville, Virginia in Loudoun County. Newcomb raised shorthorn cattle at the farm. In 1949, an animal scientist named A. H. Frank studied Newcomb's herd in a larger study of cattle breeding activities. The study sought to determine reasons why some cattle breed more regularly than others.

== Journalism activities ==
Newcomb served as sporting editor of The Field Illustrated, a magazine dedicated to agriculture and rural sports. He also served as editor-in-chief of Chase Magazine, which focused on hunting, and he wrote articles on horse racing for The Wall Street Journal.

== Family ==
Newcomb married Margaret Zolny on February 25, 1937. After they divorced four years later, he married Edith Carlisle (daughter of James Mandeville Carlisle Esq. of Washington, D.C.) on May 16, 1941. They had two children together: Penelope and Katherine. In 1953, Edith Newcomb co-founded the Loudoun Country Day School in Leesburg, Virginia after a meeting at Purcellville Library. After the school opened in 1955, she then served as its headmistress until 1963.
