= Acquisition Innovation Research Center =

United States Department of Defense affiliate

Acquisition Innovation Research Center (AIRC)
- Formation: 2020
- Type: University Affiliated Research Center (UARC)
- Headquarters: Stevens Institute of Technology, Hoboken, New Jersey
- Location: United States
- Website: acqirc.org

The Acquisition Innovation Research Center (AIRC) is a University Affiliated Research Center (UARC) that specializes in defense acquisition policies and practices. It was created by the United States Congress under Title 10, U.S. Code § 4142.

Organizationally, AIRC operates within the multi-university Systems Engineering Research Center UARC led by the Stevens Institute. Its executive sponsor is the Office of the Under Secretary of Defense for Acquisition and Sustainment, it works with various entities across the United States Department of Defense (DoD).

== History ==
AIRC was established in 2020 to provide the DoD with academic and data-based analyses, as well as policy recommendations to improve the defense acquisition system.

The center utilizes the same academic research network as SERC, which includes over 20 universities.

== Activities and programs ==
AIRC engages in a wide range of research activities, including the application of generative artificial intelligence to speed up defense acquisitions and modeling the future of acquisition reform.

=== Defense Civilian Training Corps (DCTC) ===
One of AIRC's largest initiatives is the Defense Civilian Training Corps (DCTC), a workforce development program mandated by Congress in Chapter 113 of Title 10, U.S. Code. DCTC provides scholarships, internships, and specialized curriculum to university students, preparing them for civilian careers within the DoD. AIRC was tasked by the DoD to design and manage the program, which aims to address skill shortages in the defense sector.

== Organization ==
AIRC is guided by the AIRC Innovation Panel, an advisory group composed of specialists and researchers from academia, industry, and government.

The center uses the broader SERC university network, which includes institutions such as the Georgia Institute of Technology, University of Southern California, Virginia Tech, and Georgetown University.

Like SERC, AIRC collaborates informally with external organizations such as the National Defense Industrial Association and the National Contract Management Association on events and discussions, though official research projects are government-funded.

== See also ==
- University Affiliated Research Center
- Defense acquisition
- Systems Engineering Research Center
- Under Secretary of Defense for Acquisition and Sustainment
