= Reserve Officers' Training Corps =

Military officer training program in the US

The Reserve Officers' Training Corps (ROTC /ˌrɒtsiː/ or /ˌɑːr oʊ tiː ˌsiː/) is a group of college and university-based officer training programs for training commissioned officers of the United States Armed Forces.

While ROTC graduate officers serve in all branches of the U.S. military, the U.S. Marine Corps, the U.S. Space Force, and the U.S. Coast Guard do not have their own respective ROTC programs; rather, graduates of Naval ROTC programs have the option to serve as officers in the Marine Corps contingent on meeting Marine Corps requirements. Graduates of Air Force ROTC also have the option to be commissioned in the Space Force as a Space Operations Officer. Although the Coast Guard does not operate an ROTC program, the Coast Guard Auxiliary University Programs (AUP) provides students with training and opportunities to participate in Coast Guard activities, however, participation in the AUP does not guarantee a commission.

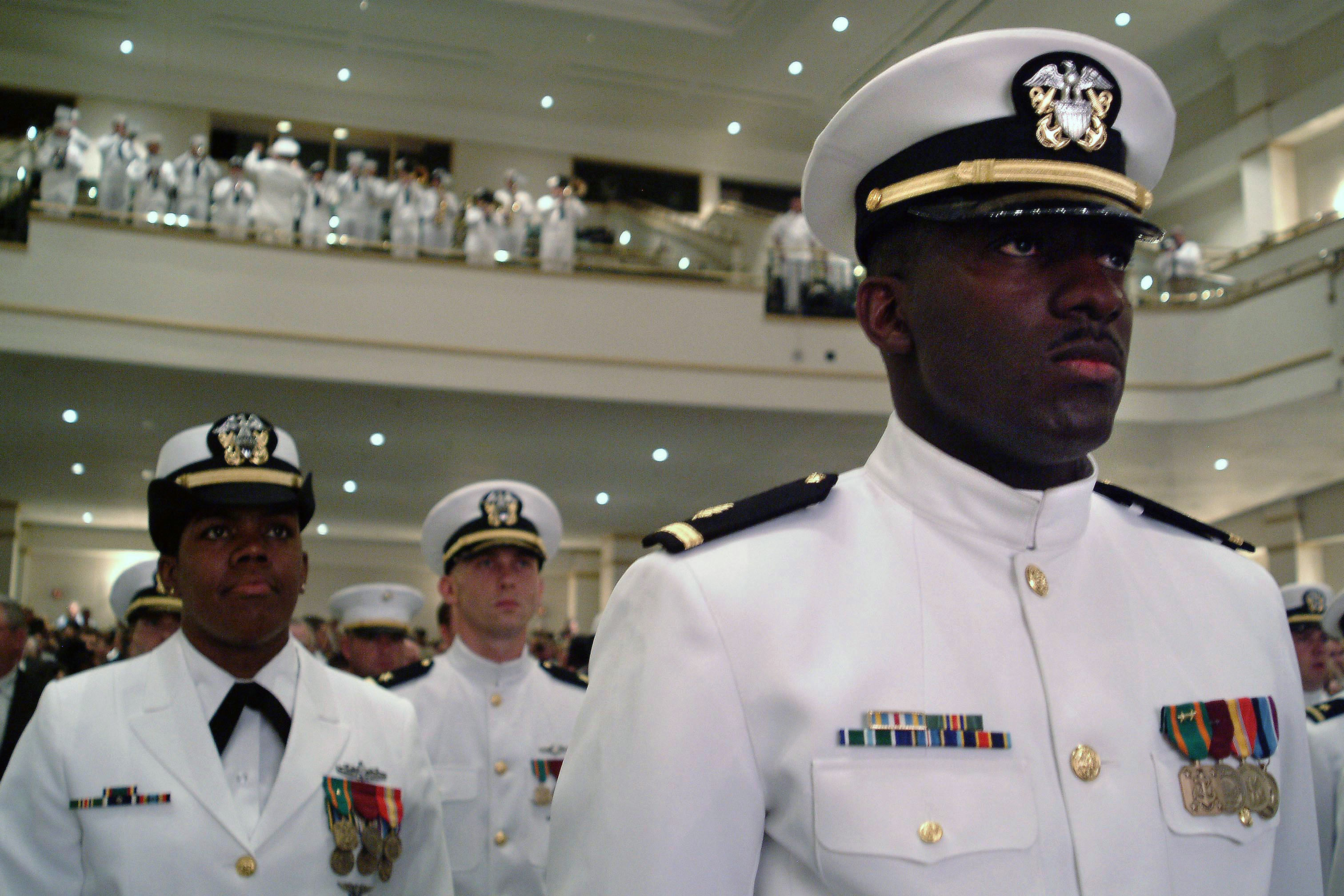
Newly graduated and commissioned officers of the Naval Reserve Officer Training Corps (NROTC) Unit Hampton Roads stand at attention as they are applauded during the spring Commissioning Ceremony in May 2004.

In 2020, ROTC graduates constituted 70 percent of newly commissioned active-duty U.S. Army officers, 83 percent of newly commissioned U.S. Marine Corps officers (through NROTC), 61 percent of newly commissioned U.S. Navy officers and 63 percent of newly commissioned U.S. Air Force officers, for a combined 56 percent of all active-duty officers in the Department of Defense commissioned that year. Under ROTC, a student may receive a competitive, merit-based scholarship covering all or part of college tuition, textbooks and lab fees, in return for an active-duty service obligation after graduation (or completion of a graduate degree under an approved education delay). ROTC students attend college like other students, but also receive basic military training and officer training for their chosen branch of service through the ROTC unit at or nearby the college. The students participate in regular drills during the school year and off-campus training opportunities during the summer.

Army ROTC units are organized as brigades, battalions and companies. Air Force ROTC units are detachments with the students organized into wings, groups, squadrons and flights. Army and Air Force ROTC students are referred to as cadets. Naval ROTC units are organized as battalions and also include NROTC students under "Marine Option" who will eventually be commissioned as officers in the Marine Corps. Marine NROTC students may be formed in a separate company when the program includes sufficient numbers. All Naval ROTC students are referred to as midshipmen. Some of the summer training that is offered to cadets in the Army ROTC program are: Airborne, Air Assault, Mountain Warfare, WHINSEC and other related schools. In addition to their mandatory 20 day Field Training (FT) at Maxwell AFB, Alabama, typically between their sophomore and junior year, Air Force ROTC cadets are also eligible for Airborne training under the tutelage of the Army at Fort Benning, Georgia. Naval ROTC midshipmen will participate in summer cruise programs every summer, either afloat or ashore, similar to their U.S. Naval Academy midshipmen counterparts.

== History ==
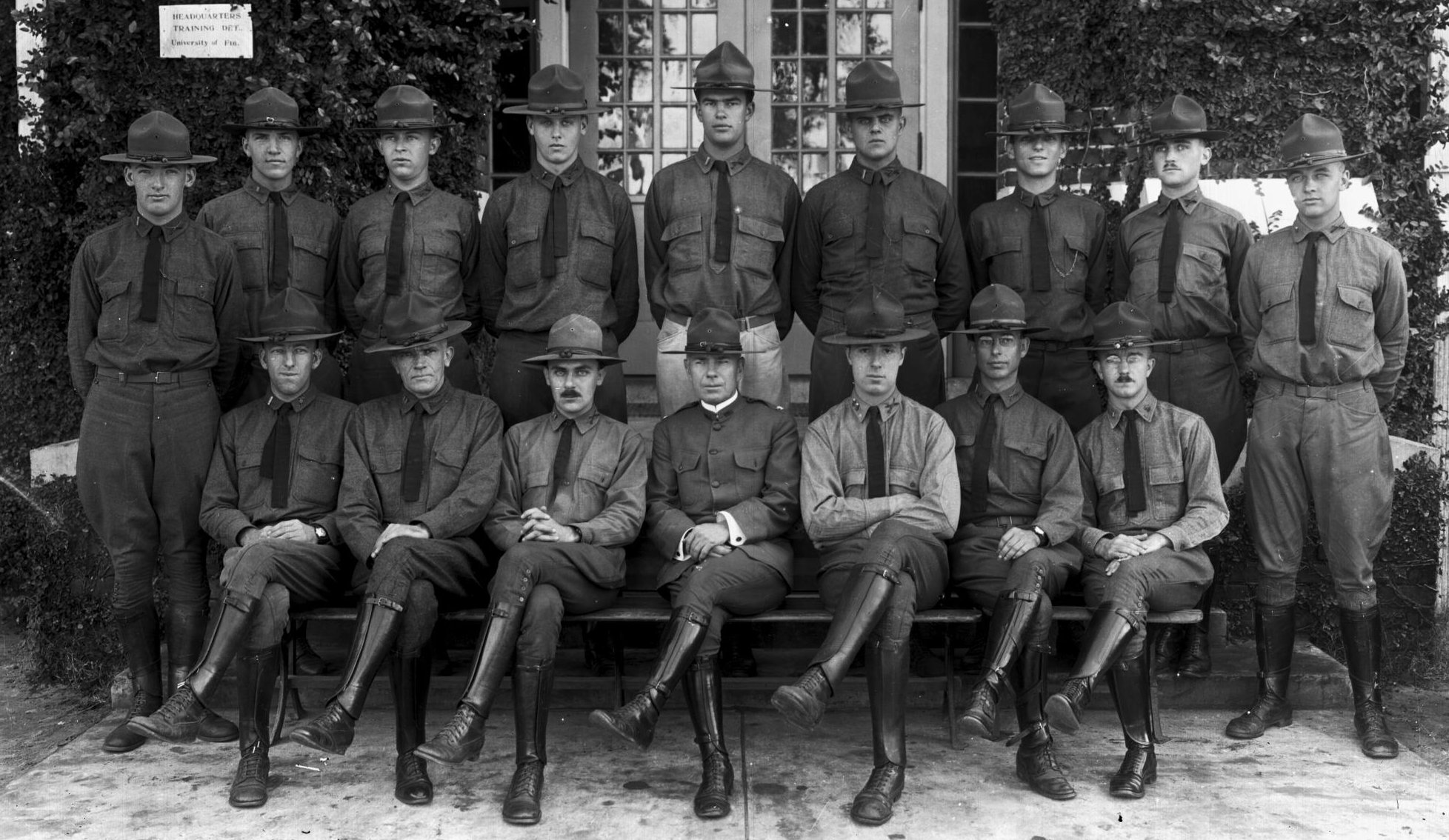
ROTC at the University of Florida during the 1920s

=== Concept ===
The concept of training reserve military officers in civilian colleges and universities in United States was created by the founder of Norwich University, Alden Partridge, who was a former United States Military Academy instructor. Partridge, who founded Norwich in Vermont in 1819 as the "American Literary, Scientific and Military Academy," promoted the idea of "citizen soldiers," men trained to act in a military capacity when their nation required but capable of fulfilling standard civilian functions in peacetime. The Morrill Act of 1862 established land-grant colleges. Part of the federal government's requirement for these schools was that they include military tactics as part of their curriculum. Another root of the modern ROTC program comes from the "Plattsburg Idea". In 1915, Major General Leonard Wood instituted the Citizen's Military Training Camps (not to be confused with the later CMTC of the interwar period), the first series of training camps to make officers out of civilians. For the first time in history, an attempt was made to provide a condensed course of training and commissioning competent reserve line officers after only a summer of military training.

=== Formal establishment and World War I ===
In 1916, the provision to formally establish ROTC was advocated to Congress by a delegation from Ohio including William Oxley Thompson, President of the Ohio State University. On February 7, 1916, Ralph D. Mershon, a graduate of Ohio State, testified before the committee as a professional engineer. Present to testify as an advocate of a Reserve Engineers Corps, he expanded his remarks to argue in favor of the "Ohio Plan". Mershon noted:

"... the transformation that will take place in one term of drill in a man just off the farm and very clumsy when he enters college, and who at the end of a term is 'set up', carries himself well, looks neat in his uniform, and has acquired a measure of self-respect, and the respect of his colleagues, to an extent he would not have had without the military training."

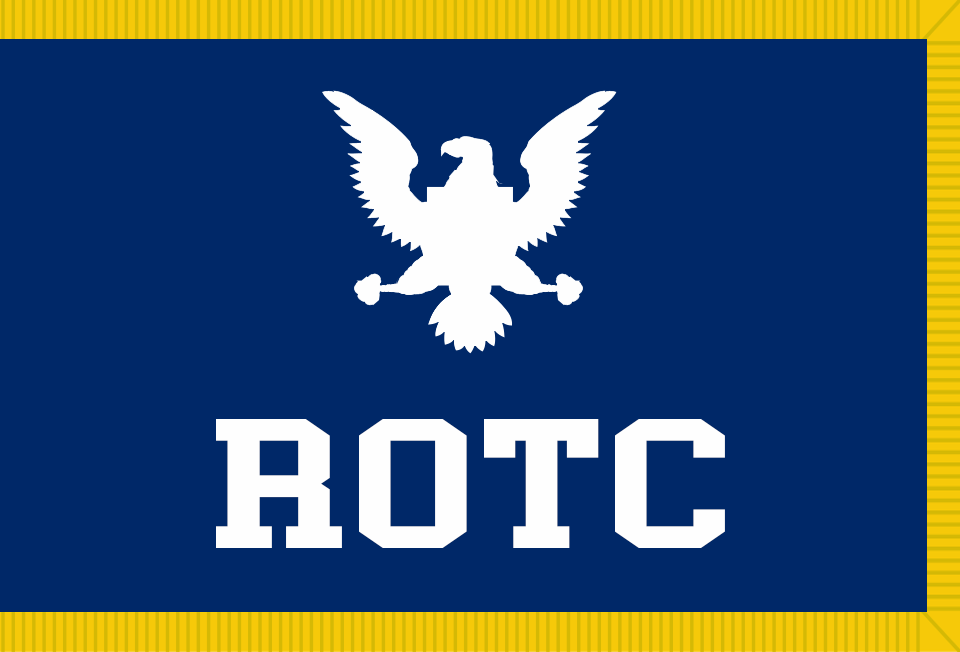
ROTC Camp Colors

Congress agreed, and the ROTC provision was included in the final version of the National Defense Act of 1916. The first ROTC unit was at Harvard in 1916.

Over 5,000 men arrived at Plattsburgh, New York, in May 1917 for the first of the officer training camps. By the end of 1917, over 17,000 men had been trained. By the eve of its entry into World War I, the U.S. had a prepared corps of officers including one of the earliest Plattsburgh graduates, Theodore Roosevelt Jr.

=== Interwar period ===
==== Senior division and the Organized Reserve ====
Beginning in 1919, many of the ROTC programs established during World War I resumed enrollments, and many new programs were organized. The National Defense Act of 1920 continued ROTC, and by the end of 1921, about 180 senior division programs were active at civilian and military colleges and universities. The branches of ROTC units offered at each college or university was based upon the kind of Organized Reserve units organized in the vicinity by the War Department; the actual organization of each type of ROTC unit attempted to conform to standard tables of organization of each branch unit. Most schools offered only one program, usually infantry, although some of the larger institutions or military colleges offered multiple branches that a cadet could consider. Only six Air Corps programs were ever established; they produced few graduates, and all were eliminated in 1936 and replaced with less expensive units, mostly infantry, at other schools. By 1928, ROTC units were commissioning 6,000 Organized Reserve second lieutenants per year. In 1935, funding for all medical ROTC programs was cut by Congress as a cost-saving measure, but they were restored the following year, when another seventeen programs of various branches were established or reestablished, giving ROTC a presence in all 48 states, Puerto Rico, Alaska, and Hawaii, including programs at four historically black colleges or universities.

The first two years of the course consisted of basic knowledge and skills common to all soldiers, while the advanced course consisted of branch-specific knowledge. In many schools, primarily land-grant and military colleges and universities, all four years were mandatory for male students. In some schools, only the first two years were mandatory. Even if a student completed all four years, he was not required to take a commission, nor did completion of the four-year program guarantee it. Cadets pursuing a commission typically attended a summer camp after their junior or senior year. Cadets from a given school would attend en masse at a Regular Army installation and go through training conducted by a unit of the same branch as that of the ROTC unit. Most often, units of the same branch from several different schools would attend at the same time. The camps lasted four weeks and served as a training, orientation, and leadership evaluation opportunity for the cadets. Once a cadet completed the four-year course and the summer camp, he was offered a commission as a second lieutenant if the school's Professor of Military Science and Tactics considered the young man of sufficient character and ability to serve as an officer in the Army of the United States.

Before the mid-1920s, new Reserve second lieutenants were assigned to Organized Reserve units of their branch located in the vicinity of their residences; this resulted in both formal and informal "feeder" relationships between schools and units located in their vicinities. In 1926-1927, the War Department also authorized Reserve officers to be assigned to "Regular Army Inactive" (RAI) units. A formal affiliation program between many RAI units, including nearly all of the infantry regiments, and nearby schools was initiated. Typically, in the case of a regiment, the school's Professor of Military Science and Tactics or the senior Regular Army officer assigned to the ROTC program was designated the regimental commander, with other Regular Army instructors assigned key positions within the regiment. However, the RAI affiliation program proved taxing for Regular Army officers who had to devote their attention to both the program and their assigned unit; by 1933, command of all RAI units was turned over to Reserve officers.

==== Junior division ====
During the 1930s, there were junior ROTC programs in some larger city high schools, such as in Memphis, Tennessee, Charlotte, North Carolina, Kansas City, Missouri, and New Orleans, Louisiana.

=== World War II ===
The extent of the U.S. Army's mobilization before its involvement in World War II—“a state neither of war nor of peace"—disrupted the Organized Reserve. Beginning in mid-1940, large numbers of Reserve officers began to be called to active duty individually and assigned to expanding Regular Army units, and to National Guard units after the mobilization of that component was authorized in August. On 30 June 1940, 2,710 Reserve officers were on active duty, but by 15 May 1941, the number was over 46,000, and by 30 June, 57,309. The need for young, qualified company-grade officers (lieutenants and captains) was acute, and by mid-1941, 75 to 90 percent of the officers in Regular Army units and 10 percent in National Guard units were Reserve officers. By December 1941, 80,000 Reserve officers were on active duty. By the end of 1942, 140,000 officers holding Reserve commissions through various paths were on active duty, but by that date, 12,100 who had been previously commissioned "had not received such orders," mainly for reasons like being over-age in grade, found medically disqualified for active service, deferred due to academics or civilian employment, or lack of vacancies.

On 6 February 1942, President Franklin D. Roosevelt signed Executive Order 9049, which ordered "into the active military service of the United States...for the duration of the present war and for six months after the termination thereof...each of the organizations and units and all of the personnel of the Organized Reserve not already in such service;" because most Reserve officers were already on active duty, this amounted to a “public relations” document. Because of the course of the mobilization of 1940–1941, "few of the Reserve officers originally assigned to...units were available for duty with them. Consequently, the units as activated bore small resemblance to those of peacetime."

The advanced ROTC program was suspended in its entirety in the spring of 1943 in concert with the institution of the Army Specialized Training Program, and no new contracts were issued for the duration of the war. The basic ROTC curriculum was kept intact as part of the military indoctrination for the Army Specialized Training Reserve Program for 17 year olds. At this time, several major categories of ROTC students existed:

- Members of the normal college class of 1942, who had completed a full four-year program plus the summer camp.
- Members of the normal college class of 1943 who had chosen to accelerate their studies via summer sessions offered in 1942 that gave a full semester or quarter of credit. These men graduated with a completed advanced course minus the summer camp at the end of 1942 if on the semester calendar, or in the early spring of 1943 if on the quarter calendar. These men, along with the members of the normal class of 1943, then went directly to officer candidate schools.
- Members of the normal college class of 1944 who had taken the 1942 summer session. These men graduated in the fall of 1943 with a partially complete (either three semesters out of four or four quarters out of six) advanced course. These men also went directly to officer-candidate schools, although some men attending institutions on the quarter calendar were allowed to remain in school through the summer quarter to ease congestion in officer-candidate schools.
- Members of the normal college class of 1945 who had taken the 1942 summer session, called "ROTC juniors." If their institution was on the semester calendar, they were due to begin advanced ROTC in the spring semester of 1943. They, along with the remaining members of the normal class of 1944, were sent to basic training after the spring semester ended.

After returning from basic training in the early fall of 1943, the ROTC juniors were allowed to resume their civilian curricula at the institutions they were attending or act as instructors in basic ROTC, which functioned as military indoctrination for the Army Specialized Training Reserve Program until called to officer candidate school. These men were only attached to the ASTP for administrative purposes.

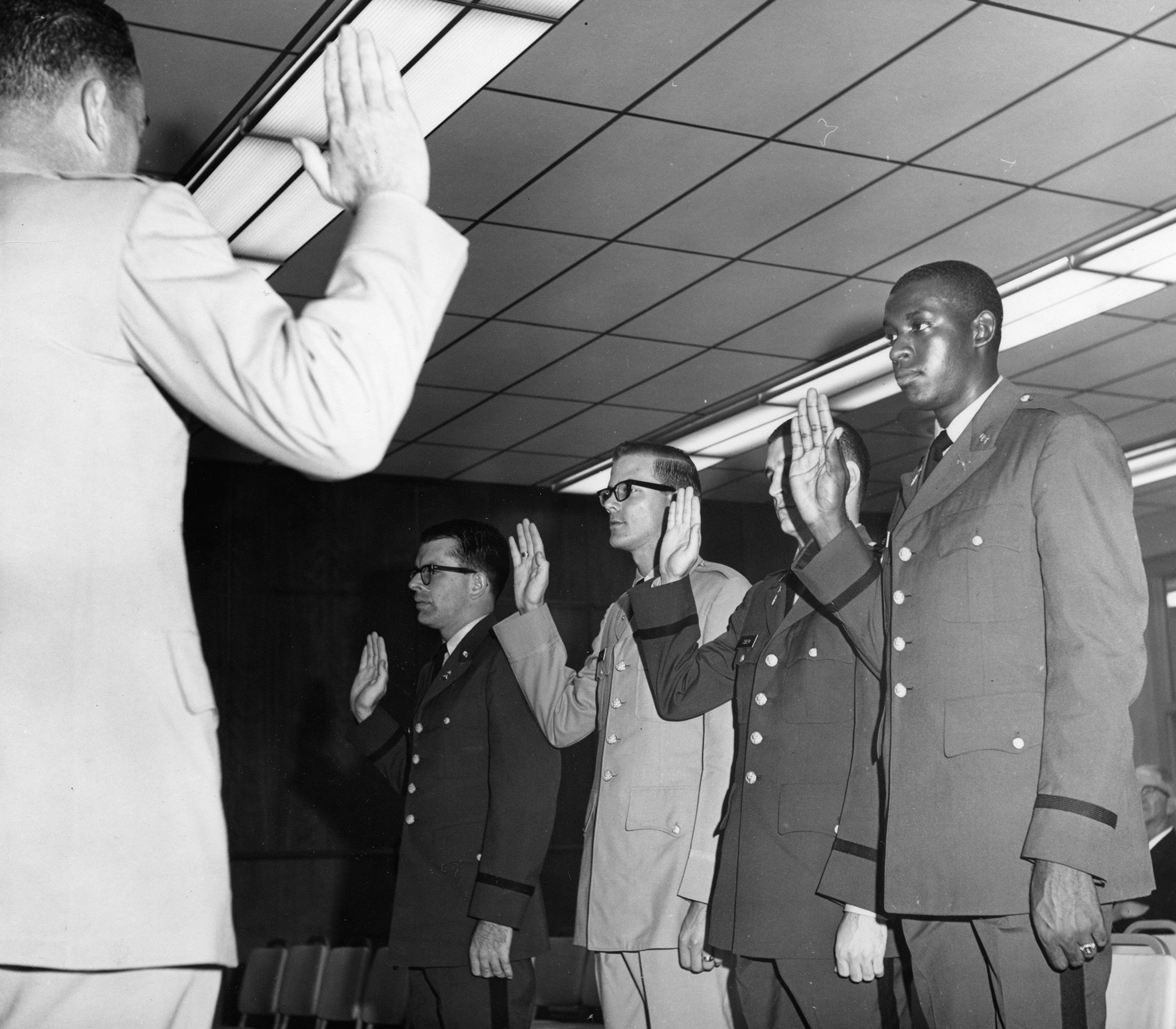
Oscar K. Chamber, the first African American ROTC graduate at Arlington State College, 1965

Cornell University's ROTC program announcement, 1973–74

=== Cold War ===
Compulsory participation in ROTC for all male students at many civilian institutions was common until the 1960s. However, because of the protests connected with opposition to U.S. involvement in the Vietnam War, compulsory ROTC was dropped in favor of voluntary programs. In some places, opposition was so severe that ROTC was expelled from campus altogether, although it was always possible to participate in off-campus ROTC. By the early 1980s, there was noticeably less resentment of the military on campus, as students' feelings about Vietnam became less vivid.

As of 2021, more than 1,700 high schools have Junior Reserve Officers' Training Corps (JROTC) programs.

In the 21st century, the debate often focused around the Congressional don't ask, don't tell law, signed into law by President Bill Clinton in 1993 and in force until 2011, which forbade homosexuals serving in the United States military from disclosing their sexual orientation at the risk of expulsion. Some schools believed this legal mandate would require them to waive or amend their non-discrimination policies.

In recent years, concerted efforts are being made at some Ivy League universities that have previously banned ROTC (including Columbia) to return ROTC to campus. The Harvard ROTC program was reinstated effective March 4, 2011 following enactment of the Don't Ask, Don't Tell Repeal Act of 2010.

Under current law, there are three types of ROTC programs administered, each with a different element.

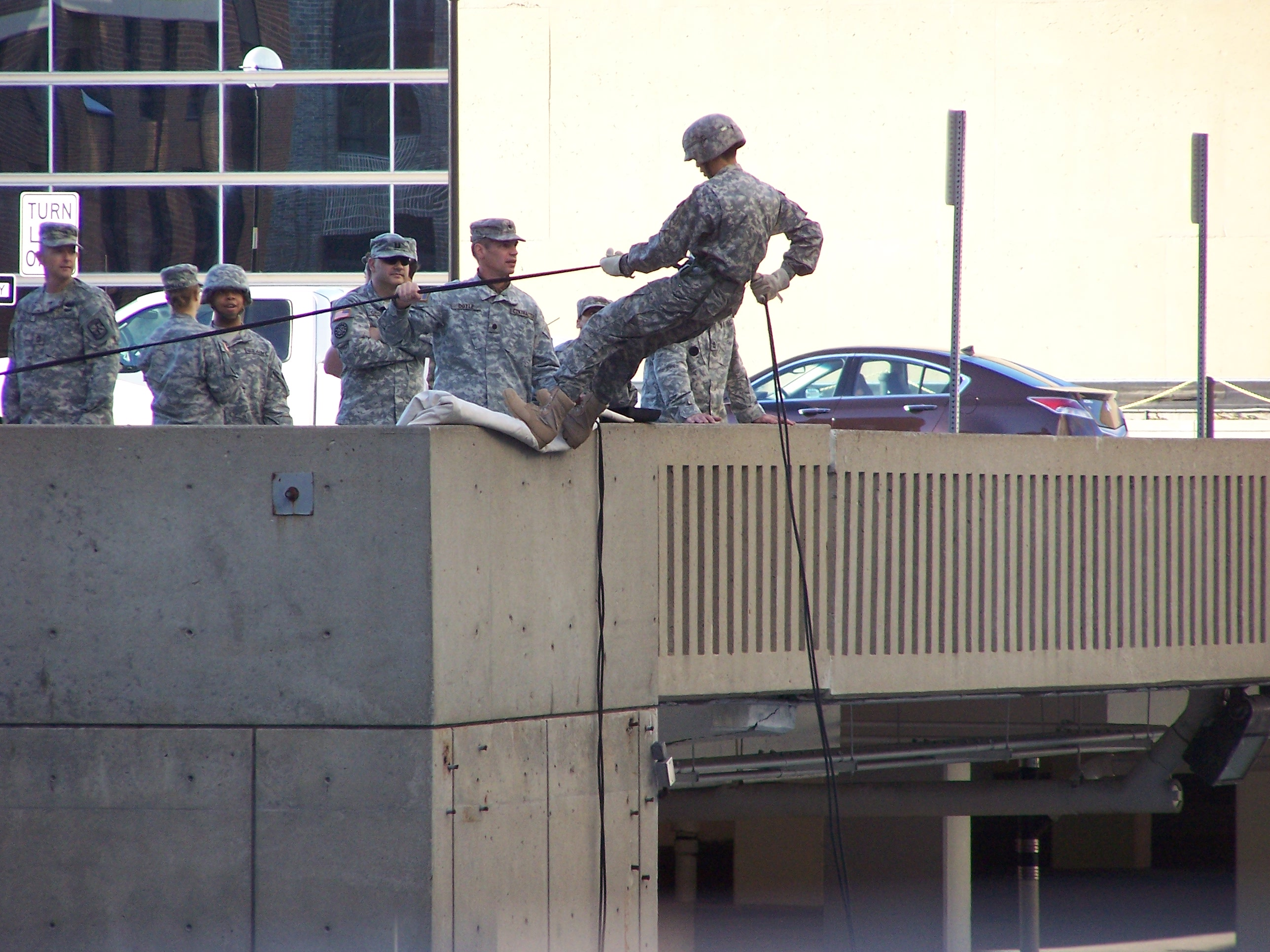
An Army ROTC unit practicing rappelling from a parking garage in September 2010

- The first are the programs at the six senior military colleges, also known as military schools. These institutions grant baccalaureate degrees (at a minimum) and organize all or some of their students into a corps of cadets under some sort of military discipline. Those participating in the cadet program must attend at least 2 years of ROTC education.
- The second are programs at "civilian colleges". As defined under Army regulations, these are schools that grant baccalaureate or graduate degrees and are not operated on a military basis.
- The third category is programs at military junior colleges (MJC). These are military schools that provide junior college education (typically A.S. or A.A. degree). These schools do not grant baccalaureate degrees but they meet all other requirements of military colleges (if participating in the Early Commissioning Program) and cadets are required to meet the same military standards as other schools (if enrolled in ECP), as set by Army Cadet Command. Cadets can be commissioned as second lieutenants in the Army Reserve/Army National Guard as graduating sophomores. Upon commissioning, these lieutenants are required to complete their bachelor's degree at another institution (of the lieutenant's choosing) while serving in their units. Upon receiving their bachelors, ECP lieutenants can assess active duty and go onto active duty as a first lieutenant. Only the Army currently offers an Early Commissioning Program. In time of war, MJC's have played a significant role in producing officers for the Army. During the Vietnam war, the requirement to complete one's bachelor's degree was not in effect. Therefore, upon commissioning lieutenants went straight onto active duty.

One difference between civilian colleges and the senior or junior military colleges is enrollment option in ROTC. ROTC is voluntary for students attending civilian colleges and universities. However, with few exceptions (as outlined in both Army regulations and federal law) it is required of students attending the senior and junior military colleges. Another major difference between the senior military colleges and civilian colleges is that under federal law, graduates of the SMCs are guaranteed active duty assignments if requested with the approval of the school's professor of military science.

== U.S. Army ROTC ==
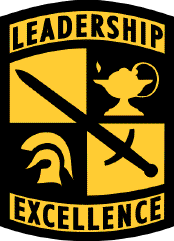
US Army ROTC SSI

The Army Reserve Officer Training Corps (AROTC) program is the largest branch of ROTC, as the Army is the largest branch of the military. There are over 20,000 ROTC cadets in 273 ROTC programs at major universities throughout the United States. These schools are categorized as Military Colleges (MC), Military Junior Colleges (MJC) and Civilian Colleges (CC). Army ROTC provides the majority of the Army's officer corps; the remainder comes from West Point, Officer Candidate School (OCS), or direct commissions.

AROTC offers scholarships based on the time of enrollment in the program. Newly graduated seniors in high school can enter the program with a full four-year scholarship while college students can enroll later and earn a scholarship that would cover the remainder of their college career. Additional scholarships are available depending on the Cadet's involvement in the Army National Guard, Reserves, or intentions to become Active-Duty status after graduation.

Penn Tech Army ROTC cadet conducting land navigation training in November 2026

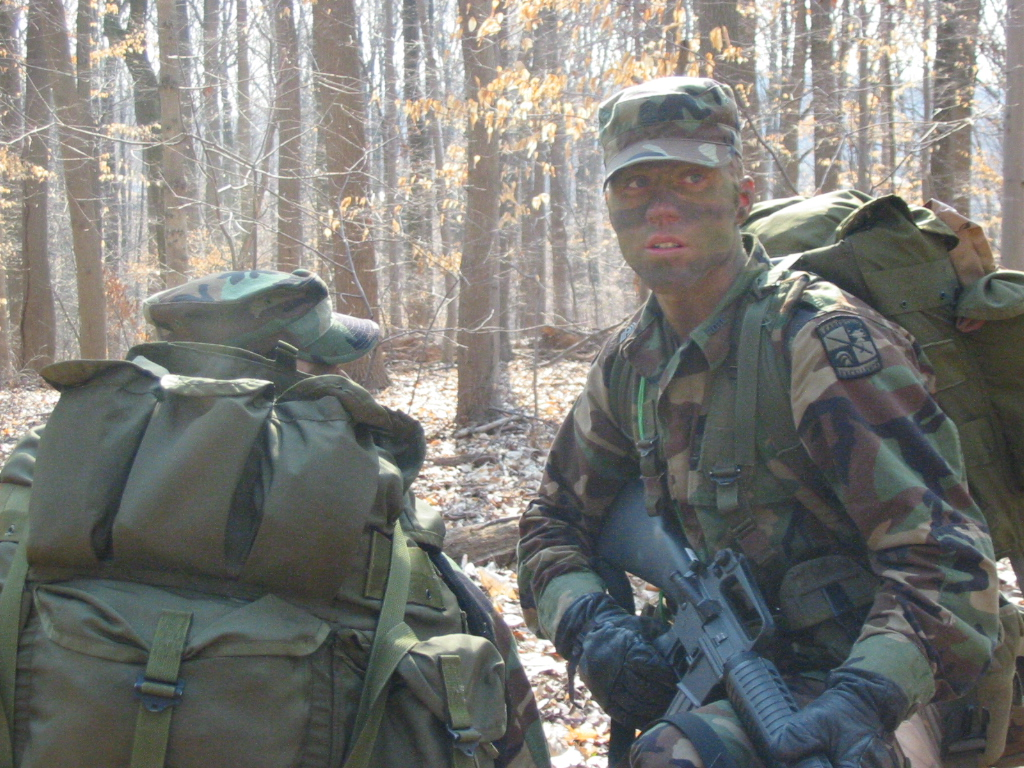
Army ROTC cadets on a field training exercise in March 2005

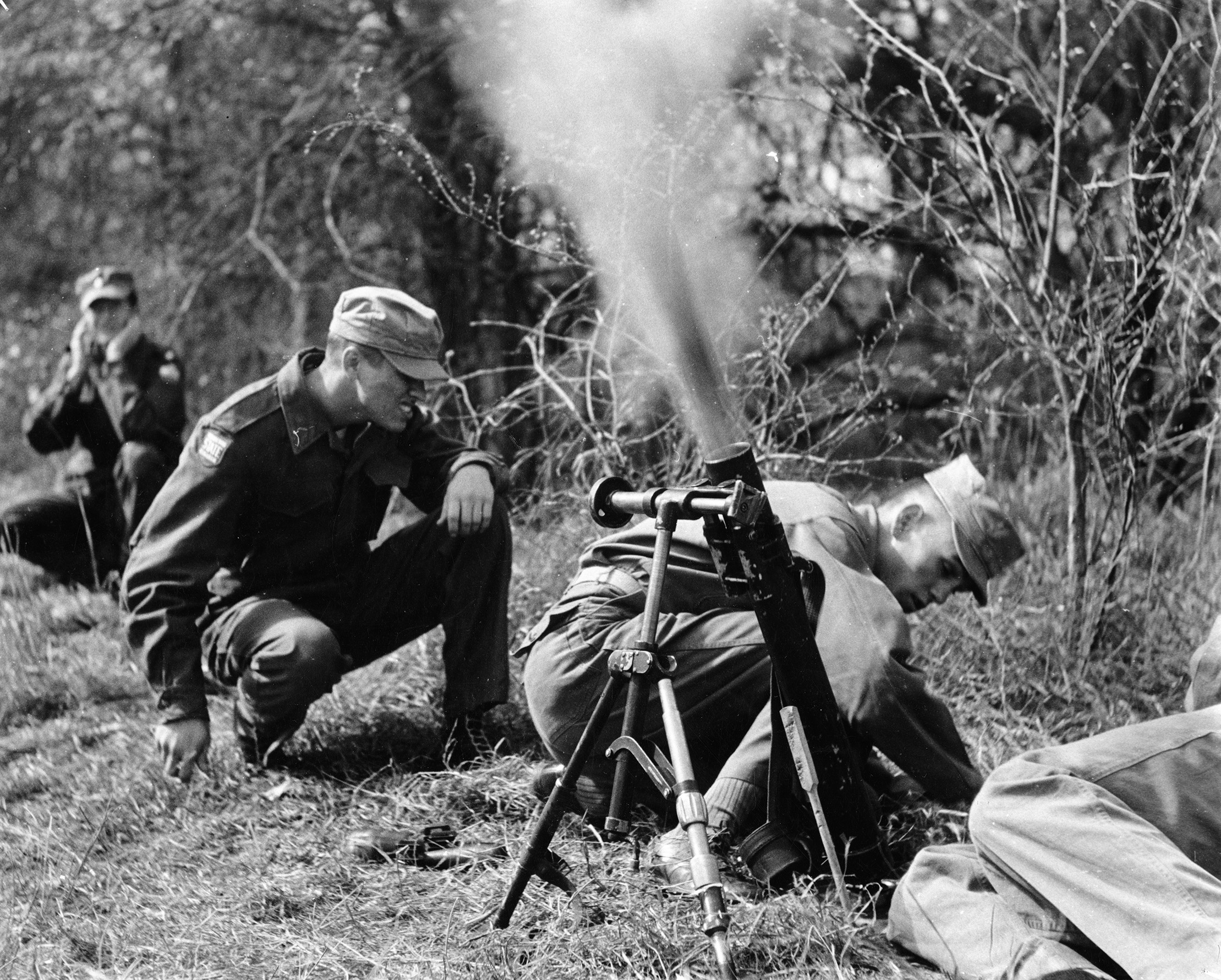
Arlington State College ROTC students firing a mortar during a field exercise, c. 1950s

The two-year scholarship is available for students with two academic years of college remaining. An applicant for a two-year or four-year scholarship must meet the following requirements:

- Be a U.S. citizen
- Have a high school diploma or equivalent
- Be between ages 17 and 27
- Have a college GPA of at least 2.5
- Meet the Army Fitness Test standards (formerly ACFT.)

The applicant must agree to accept a commission and serve in the Army on active duty or in a reserve component (U.S. Army Reserve or Army National Guard).

The four-year scholarship is for students who receive it out of high school or before entering college. The four-year scholarship can be extended with the same conditions to a 5-year scholarship if the major is in Engineering.

Campus-based three-year, two-and-a-half-year, and two-year scholarships are available for students already enrolled in a college or university with three (or two) academic years remaining.

An applicant for a campus-based scholarship must meet all AROTC administrative and academic requirements as well as have a minimum SAT score of 1000 or ACT score of 19.

Once a prospect has shown interest in the AROTC program they can compete in a scholarship board. If the prospect boards well the AROTC program's Professor of Military Science may submit them for selection of a scholarship. Numerous factors will influence this decision.

Army ROTC cadets complete Cadet Summer Training at Fort Knox, Kentucky, which consists of two main courses: Basic Camp and Advanced Camp.

Basic Camp is a roughly 30-day course that introduces cadets to the Army. Its primary audience is lateral entry cadets, who join ROTC in their sophomore or junior year and attend Basic Camp to complete the military science lessons that other cadets take during their first two years of the program. Students with prior enlisted service who have completed Army basic training, or the equivalent in another service branch, receive placement credit for the first two years and are not required to attend Basic Camp.

Advanced Camp is typically held the summer between a cadet's junior and senior years. The month-long course is run by Army officers and noncommissioned officers, evaluates cadets' leadership skills, and is the Army's largest training event. All cadets must complete Advanced Camp to receive a commission.

Cadets who are dismissed from Advanced Camp, withdraw from it, or are not recommended for credit may be disenrolled from ROTC under Army Regulation 145-1. Disenrolled scholarship cadets may be required to repay the cost of their scholarship or serve as enlisted soldiers on active duty.

== U.S. Naval ROTC ==
The Naval Reserve Officer Training Corps (NROTC) program was founded in 1926 and the U.S. Marine Corps joined the program in 1932. The naval NROTC program is offered at over 150 colleges nationwide.

== U.S. Air Force ROTC ==
US Air Force ROTC

The first Air Force Reserve Officer Training Corps (then Air ROTC) units were established between 1920 and 1923 at the University of California, Berkeley, the Georgia Institute of Technology, the University of Illinois, the University of Washington, the Massachusetts Institute of Technology and Texas A&M University. After World War II, the Air Force established ROTC units at 77 colleges and universities throughout the United States.

== Non-U.S. ROTC programs ==
Other national armed forces in countries with strong historical ties to the United States have ROTC programs.

- ROTC in the Philippines began in 1912 during American territorial rule with the creation of the first unit at the University of the Philippines. The National ROTC Alumni Association (NRAA) of the Philippines estimates that 75 percent of the officer corps of the Armed Forces of the Philippines come from ROTC.
- ROTC in South Korea started in 1961.
- ROTC in Taiwan started in the 1960s with training courses being severely reduced over the years as an experiment before it was implemented again in 1997.

Other countries have also institutionalized reservist training programs. Reserve Officer Training in Russia began in the 1920s. Brazil has had the CPOR and the NPOR since 1928, the difference being that officers trained by the CPOR choose their area of specialization, while officers trained by the NPOR learn from their local army base.

== Student Army Training Corps (SATC) ==
During World War I, the United States created the Student Army Training Corps under the leadership of Brigadier General Robert I. Rees in an effort to encourage young men to simultaneously receive a college education and train for the military. Students were authorized to participate beginning in the summer of 1917, and training camps were held in the summer of 1918.

Enrollment in the SATC was voluntary, and 525 universities enrolled 200,000 total students on October 1, 1918, the first day SATC units were authorized to formally organize on college campuses. Students who joined the SATC received the rank of private in the army, and some advanced to leadership roles including sergeant.

When the Armistice of November 11, 1918 ended the war, the Army's need for more soldiers and officers ended. The SATC was disbanded in December 1918, and its members were honorably discharged from the military.

=== Notable members ===
Individuals who served in the Student Army Training Corps included:

- Frederick Van Ness Bradley, U.S. Representative
- Wilburn Cartwright, U.S. Representative
- Deane Davis, governor of Vermont
- William O. Douglas, associate justice of the U.S. Supreme Court
- Harold Earthman, U.S. Representative
- Kenneth Keating, U.S. Senator and ambassador
- F. Ray Keyser Sr., Associate Justice of the Vermont Supreme Court
- Carl Mays, Major League Baseball pitcher
- Claude Pepper, U.S. Senator and U.S. Representative
- Al Sheehan, entertainment businessman and radio host
- Donald George Tewksbury. Professor, Columbia Teachers College, President Bard College.
- J. Ernest Wharton, U.S. Representative

== See also ==
- Early Commissioning Program
- Army University
- Defense Civilian Training Corps
- Pershing Rifles
- Military Junior College
- United States Senior Military College
- United States Service academies
- Junior Reserve Officers' Training Corps (JROTC)
- Reveille (dog) (Cadet General)
- Gold Bar Recruiter
- Military departments of civilian universities (Soviet Union and post-Soviet area)
- Reserve Officer Training in Russia
