= Georgia Military College =

Public college in Milledgeville, Georgia, US

Coordinates: 33.07920°N 83.22296°W

- Motto: Character Above All
- Type: Public military junior college
- Established: October 14, 1879
- Accreditation: SACS
- Endowment: 44.83 million (2023)
- President: Army Major General (ret.) Terrence J. McKenrick
- Vice-president: Susan Isaac Daniel
- Faculty: 497 (fall 2024)
- Undergraduates: 6,575 (fall 2024)
- Location: Milledgeville, Georgia, United States
- Campus: Urban, 25 acres (0.1 km²)
- Athletics: Bulldogs
- Colors: Red and black
- Sporting affiliations: NJCAA – GCAA
- Website: gmc.edu
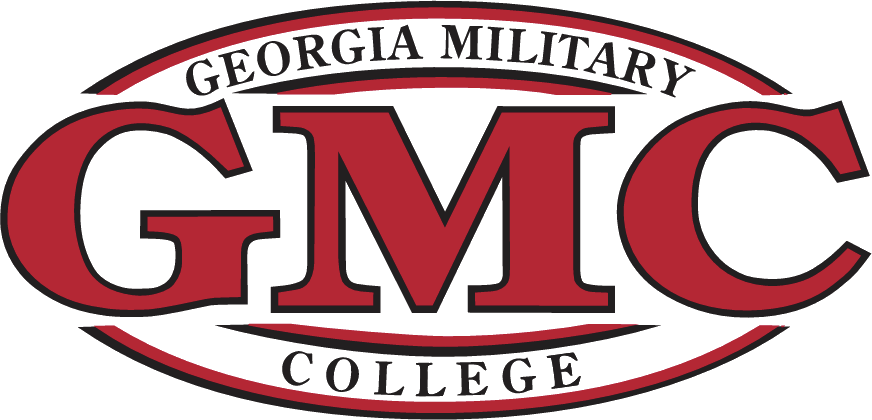

Georgia Military College (GMC) is a public military junior college in Milledgeville, Georgia. It is divided into the junior college, a military junior college program, high school, middle school, and elementary school. It was originally known as Middle Georgia Military and Agricultural College, until 1900. While GMC is a state-chartered and funded institution, its governance is not overseen by either the Board of Regents of the University System of Georgia or the State Board of the Technical College System of Georgia.

The main facility is housed in the restored old Georgia state capitol building that was the seat of government for the State of Georgia from 1807 to 1868. The main campus in Milledgeville serves approximately 254 full-time, resident ROTC Cadets and 1300 commuter students. GMC also has 8 distance learning centers and an online college with nearly 16,500 students.

GMC is one of four military junior colleges that participate in the U.S. Army's Early Commissioning Program. Students who graduate from GMC's two-year, military science-oriented curriculum receive an officer's commission in the U.S. Army. The junior college was established in 1879, and later added a preparatory school for students in 6th grade through 12th grade, which uses military style exercises to build leadership.

The college's military preparatory school for cadets is in Baldwin County and has approximately 314 middle school students and 277 high-school Junior ROTC (JROTC) students. The preparatory school's dual enrollment program enables qualified sophomores, juniors, and seniors to attend classes at the junior college and the high school simultaneously, while earning credit for both their high school diploma and their college degree.

== History ==
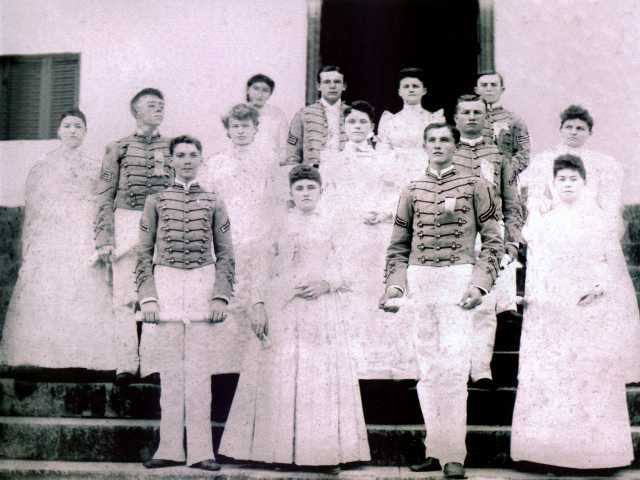
1890 graduation class

Georgia Military College was created in 1879 by act of the Georgia General Assembly "to educate young men and women from the Middle Georgia area in an environment which fosters the qualities of good citizenship." It was the apparent intention of the General Assembly to establish the school as a unit of the slowly forming University System of Georgia. State property in Milledgeville, including the former state capital building which had been damaged by General William T. Sherman's "March to the Sea", was loaned to the University of Georgia by the Act of 1879, and the Board of Trustees of the University of Georgia was given veto powers by this Act over the acts of the local Board of Trustees of the new institution. The school was originally called Middle Georgia Military and Agricultural College and was ceded state government lands surrounding the Old Capitol Building, the seat of government for the state of Georgia from 1807 to 1868. The Old Capitol Building, then as now, is the main college facility and sits on the highest point in Milledgeville. Former Confederate general Daniel Harvey Hill served as president from 1885 until August 1889, when he resigned due to failing health. (He died in Charlotte, NC on September 24, 1889.) The 1890 graduating class was the first to include female students.

The college's intended purpose was to enable graduates to enter higher classes at the University of Georgia, to give training in agriculture and mining, and, finally, to train teachers.

The name of the school was changed to Georgia Military College in 1900. Legislative acts of 1920 and 1922 severed the relationship with the University of Georgia and gave the local board total power over the operations of the school. In 1922, the method of electing members of the board of trustees and filling vacancies on the board was changed. This act provided for a seven-member board to be elected from and by the citizens of Milledgeville, with trustees' terms staggered to provide continuity. In 1930, the official addition of a junior college division to the college-preparatory secondary school finally justified its name. In 1950, the Defense Department designated the institution a "military junior college". Today, it is one of only four remaining US military junior colleges.

== Campuses ==
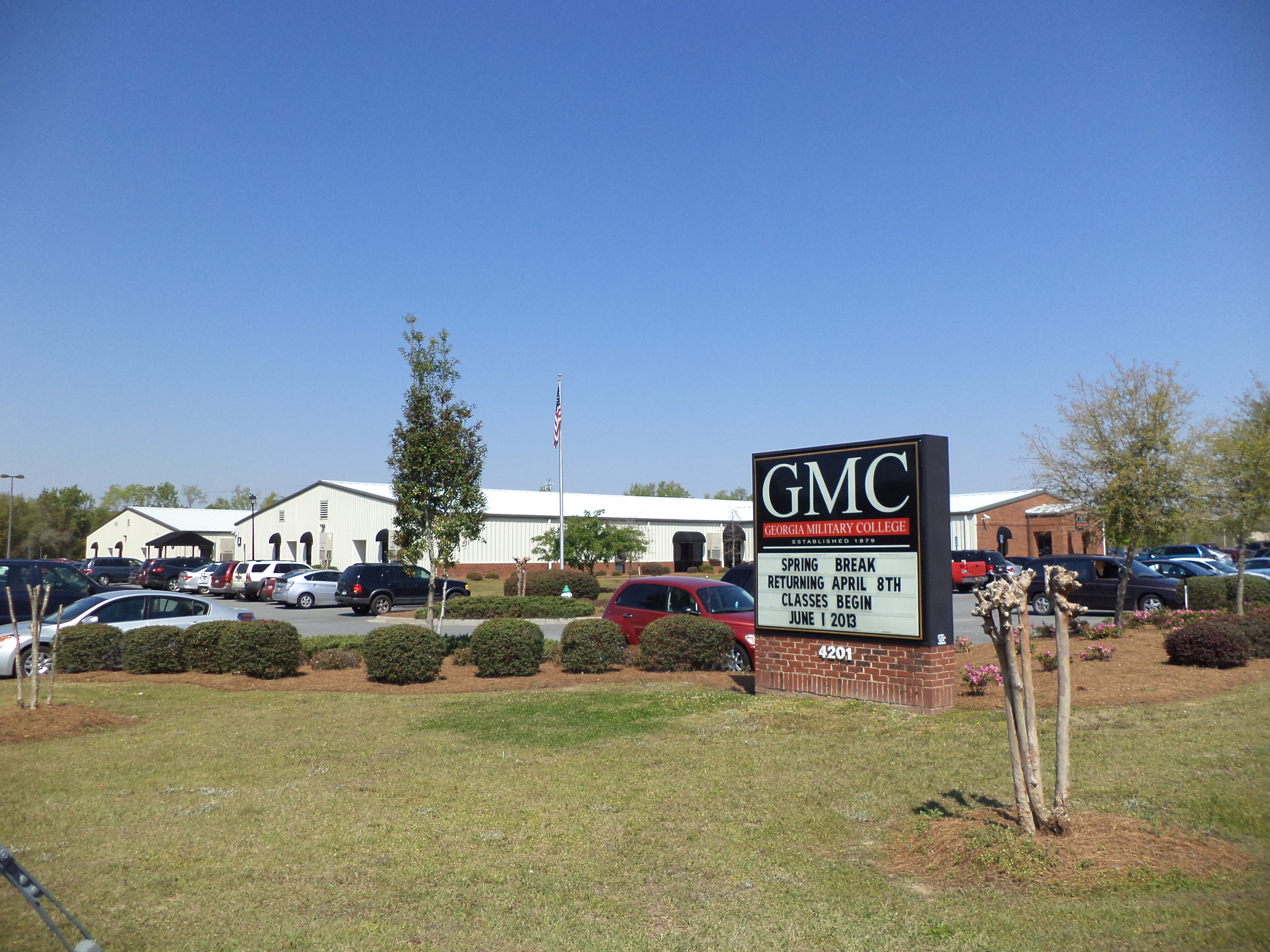
Valdosta campus

In addition to the main campus in Milledgeville, GMC Junior College other campus locations Fairburn, Augusta, Columbus, Madison, Valdosta, Warner Robins, Dublin, and an online college. The other campus locations serve as distant learning centers to their local communities.

Georgia Military College Columbus Campus is the only liberal arts junior college in Columbus. The Columbus campus opened at Fort Benning in 1997, moved to Cross Country Office Park in 2004, and into a new facility at 2221 Manchester Expressway in 2023.

GMC also operates a GMC Online. This allows GMC to offer degrees to people who that work and don't have the time to come to campus, who are stationed overseas, or just enjoy going to school online. The online campus allows GMC to serve not just local but also global communities.

== Corps of Cadets ==
The GMC Corps of Cadets is designed to enhance leadership capabilities of students in both military and civilian lives. Cadets do daily physical training to improve fitness. Some cadets are selected to partake in the ranger challenge competition. During the day, cadets attend classes throughout the day to work on academics. Along with this, cadets also frequently stand in for parades and command retreat. There are also multiple clubs and extracurriculars cadets can take part in such as drill and color guard teams, a glee club, and more. Cadets also may be selected to hold leadership in the corps where they will be assigned at the team to regimental levels or staff duty. When cadets first arrive at GMC, they go through a six-week "plebe" phase to introduce them to military customs and life at the junior college.

GMC opened its modern barracks (dorm) facility in January 2007 for the 254 students that comprise the Corps of Cadets. A new academic building and dining hall have recently been completed.

=== Cadet types ===
The Corps of Cadets have several types of cadets in the program. These include Early Commissioning Program cadets, State Service cadets, Civic Leaders, and Service Academy Prep cadets.The Corps of Cadets also includes the middle and high schoolers in the Army Junior Reserve Officers' Training Corps (AJROTC) of the GMC Preparatory School. JROTC cadets do not participate in most of the college-level cadet activities and have no military obligation after graduating high school.

==== Early Commissioning Program ====
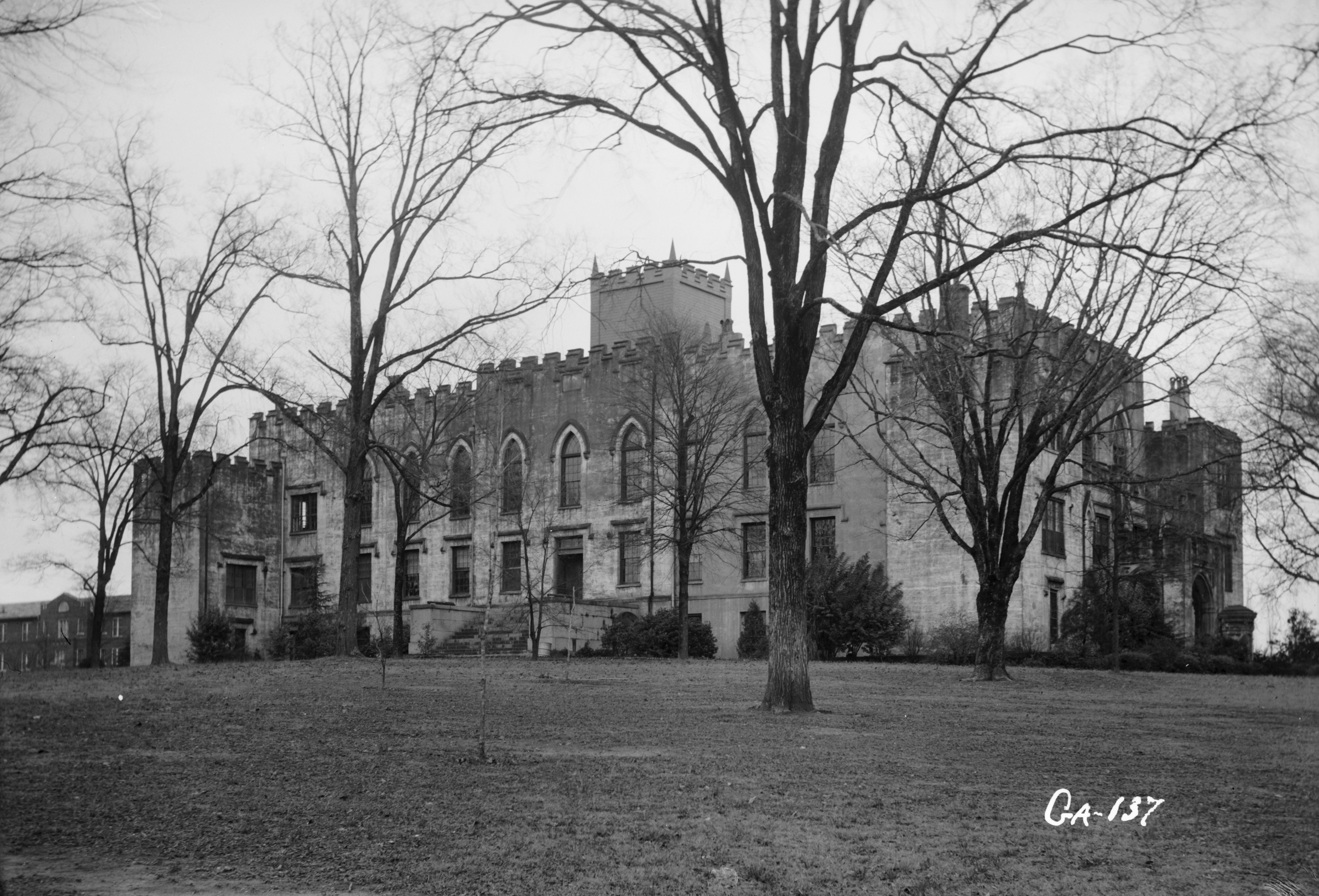
Georgia's second capitol building, 1937, now part of Georgia Military College

GMC's Early Commissioning Program (ECP) is designed to enable students to become a second lieutenant in the US Army after the first two years in college. GMC offers funding specifically to help pay costs for Corps of Cadet members on the Milledgeville campus. The State Service Scholarship Program provides 39 full scholarships to qualified Georgia residents with an interest in military service as well as a quality college education. The program is funded through the Georgia General Assembly. Scholarship recipients are required to become members of either the Army or Air National Guard, and must be nominated by a member of the Georgia General Assembly. These scholarships cover tuition, fees, rooms, board, books and supplies. Scholarship winners must join the Corps of Cadets and participate in Army ROTC. Army ROTC scholarships are also available for qualified cadets interested in the Early Commissioning Program (ECP). These scholarships are funded through ROTC and cover tuition, fees, and books, plus a monthly stipend. There are various options for ROTC scholarship based on the student's desire for active duty or reserve component duty.

After completing studies at GMC, a transfer scholarship is available for those GMC graduates desiring to complete their four-year degree at a university of their choosing with an ROTC program. Being commissioned, they do not take military science classes, however, are still expected to get their bachelor's degree or have their commission revoked.

One of the ways in which a student can become an ECP cadet is to attend Basic Camp (not to be confused with Basic Combat Training, which is for enlisted soldiers). The course is thirty-one days long. Between the cadet's freshmen and sophomore years, the cadet will attend the Advanced Camp at Fort Knox, Kentucky. Following AC, the cadet may be able to attend additional training with Army units all over the world and in the United States. After completing required training, the Cadet is commissioned as a U.S. Army officer at the end of his/her sophomore year. The ECP program allows cadets to become commissioned second lieutenants two years earlier than normal ROTC and West Point cadets. These commissioned army officers can then serve in the Army Reserve or Army National Guard, or compete for revocation and then for active duty. After completing their four-year degrees, they will be promoted to first lieutenant.

==== State Service cadets ====
State Service cadets are cadets who attend GMC while simultaneously serving in the Georgia National Guard. These cadets still retain their same rank in the National Guard and attend drill regularly with their unit. Unlike ECP cadets, State Service cadets do not commission upon graduation and maintain their same service obligation.

==== Civic Leaders ====
Civic Leader cadets hold no military obligation and upon graduation may choose to further their education at a 4-year university or seek employment. These cadets still are able to get the benefits of increased discipline and leadership skills.

===== Service Academy Prep cadets =====
Students who apply to a service academy may be redirected to attend GMC for a year. During this year, they are expected to take a strong course load, take on extracurriculars, and excel physically in hopes of receiving appointment to the service academy of their choice. These cadets are divided between cadets who have been nominated from their service academy and receive a scholarship from their branch's academy and self-prep cadets who have not been nominated and pay through other means (financial aid, cash, loans, other scholarships).

== High school and middle school ==
Because it is part of JROTC, GMC's high school has mandatory 50-minute LET (Leadership, Education, Training) classes throughout the day. The school day is followed by a 50-minute period of marching on Davenport field three times a week.

After-school extracurricular activities include marching band, football, baseball, basketball, softball, rifle team, drill team, dance line, cheerleading, color guard, cross country, soccer, tennis, track, and raiders.

The school's middle school is modeled after the high school, having drill at the end of the day led by cadets.

== Athletics ==
Georgia Military College competes in soccer, tennis, golf, cross country, softball, and football. The college's sports teams are nicknamed the Bulldogs.

The college football program has firmly established itself as one of the finest junior college programs in the country. Since 1991, GMC has developed 36 All-Americans, won the Junior College National Championship in 2001, played for the national championship in 2002, played in eight junior college bowl games, and sent over 250 young men to continue their education and athletic careers at four-year institutions across the country. The football team finished the 2005 season ranked second in the nation.

On the golf course, the Bulldogs took home the 2004 NJCAA DIII National Championship Trophy, with Brendon O'Connell taking the individual title.

Alumnus Macoumba Kandji scored the game-winning goal in the 2010 MLS Cup, lifting the Colorado Rapids soccer team over FC Dallas.

== Notable alumni ==
=== Military and politics ===
- William P. Acker, USAF, former commander of Third Air Force and 19th president of Georgia Military College
- George Busbee, governor of Georgia (1975–1983)
- Bobby Christine, former U.S. Attorney for the Southern District of Georgia, Brig. Gen. Army National Guard
- Charles B. Eichelberger, former deputy chief of staff for intelligence, U.S. Army
- Mike Giallombardo, member of the Florida House of Representatives
- Alexus Grynkewich, USAF, commander of Ninth Air Force
- Shelby Highsmith, former Senior Judge of the United States District Court for the Southern District of Florida
- Claude M. Kicklighter, former commanding general of U.S. Army Western Command (later known as United States Army Pacific)
- William Usery, former United States Secretary of Labor
- Carl Vinson, father of the Two-Ocean Navy Act
- Robin L. Williams, former member Georgia House of Representatives
- Culver Kidd Jr., Georgia state representative and senator
- Powell A. Moore, former United States representative to the Organization for Security and Co-operation in Europe
- William Theodore Moore Jr., Senior United States district judge of the United States District Court for the Southern District of Georgia.
- Max W. Noah. former comptroller of the United States Army and commandant of the United States Army Engineering School

=== Medicine ===
- Alfred Blalock, cardiac surgery pioneer

=== Entertainment ===
- Oliver Hardy, comedian from Laurel and Hardy; was a pupil for some years
- DeAnna Pappas, TV personality

=== Sports ===
- J. I. Albrecht, Hall of Fame CFL General Manager, of the Montreal Alouettes and Toronto Argonauts.
- Jasper Brinkley, former NFL player
- Lorenzo Bromell, former NFL player
- Trent Brown, NFL player
- Durant Brooks, former NFL player and Ray Guy Award winner
- Isaac Butts, professional basketball player
- Nic Clemons, former NFL player
- YaYa Diaby, NFL player
- Corvey Irvin, former NFL player
- Macoumba Kandji, professional footballer
- Jalen Royals, NFL player
- Keith Stokes, former NFL and CFL player.
- Daniel Wilcox, former NFL player
- Jarius Wynn, former NFL player
- Byron Young, NFL player
- Peppi Zellner, former NFL player
