= University Affiliated Research Center =

United States Department of Defense affiliate

A University Affiliated Research Center (UARC) is a strategic United States Department of Defense (DoD) research center associated with a university. UARCs are formally established by the under secretary of defense for research and engineering (USD (R&E)). UARCs were developed to ensure that essential engineering and technology capabilities of particular importance to the DoD are maintained. They have many similarities with federally funded research and development centers, including sole source funding under the authority of 10 U.S.C. § 2304(c)(3)(B). However, UARCs are allowed to compete for other science and technology work, except when it is prohibited by their contracts.

== Background ==
These nonprofit organizations maintain essential research, development and engineering "core" capabilities; maintain long-term strategic relationships with their DoD sponsors; and operate in the public interest, free from real or perceived conflicts of interest. Collaboration with the educational and research resources available at their universities enhances each UARC’s ability to meet the needs of their sponsors.

University affiliated laboratories have been conducting research and development for the United States Navy since 1942, beginning with the creation of the Applied Physics Lab at Johns Hopkins. The most recent UARC, created in 2023, is the Research Institute for Tactical Autonomy, led by Howard University, which is performing research for the United States Air Force.

Occasionally, the creation of UARCs have been controversial. For example, in July 2004 the Navy proposed the University of Hawaiʻi at Mānoa as a UARC. In response, some students and others protested with a six-day sit in at the campus administration building.

== List of current centers ==
Current UARCs and their sponsors are:

=== Air Force ===
- Howard University: Research Institute for Tactical Autonomy (RITA)

=== Army ===
- University of Southern California: Institute for Creative Technologies
- Georgia Institute of Technology: Georgia Tech Research Institute (Note: One of the six originally designated DoD UARCs)
- University of California at Santa Barbara: Institute for Collaborative Biotechnologies
- Massachusetts Institute of Technology: Institute for Soldier Nanotechnologies

=== Missile Defense Agency ===
- Prior to 22 August 2025, Utah State University’s Space Dynamics Laboratory was sponsored by MDA. On that date, USU/SDL’s UARC sponsor became the US Space Force.

=== Space Force ===
- Utah State University: Space Dynamics Laboratory

=== Navy ===
- Johns Hopkins University: Applied Physics Laboratory
- Pennsylvania State University: Applied Research Laboratory
- University of Texas at Austin: Applied Research Laboratories
- University of Washington: Applied Physics Laboratory
- University of Hawaiʻi at Mānoa: Applied Research Laboratory

=== OSD ===
- Stevens Institute of Technology: Systems Engineering Research Center (SERC) (contains the Acquisition Innovation Research Center (AIRC)), sponsored by the Office of the Undersecretary of Defense for Research and Engineering (OUSD(R&E)).
- University of Maryland, College Park: Applied Research Laboratory for Intelligence and Security (ARLIS), sponsored by Office of the Undersecretary of Defense for Intelligence and Security (OUSD(I&S))

=== NORAD and USNORTHCOM ===
- University of Alaska Fairbanks: Geophysical Institute

=== USSTRATCOM ===
- University of Nebraska: National Strategic Research Institute

=== NASA ===
- Johns Hopkins University: Applied Physics Laboratory

== List of former centers ==
Former UARCs and their sponsors are:

=== NASA ===
- University of California, Santa Cruz: UARC at Ames Research Center (2003 - 2016)

=== National Security Agency ===
- University of Maryland, College Park: Center for Advanced Study of Language (2003 - 2018)
