= Johnny R. Miller =

Major General Johnny R. Miller was an Assistant Adjutant General of the Illinois Army National Guard. He served from 2011 to 2015.

== Career ==
Miller was commissioned an officer in 1984 through the Early Commissioning Program at Wentworth Military Academy and College in Lexington, Missouri. From 1986 to 1989, was stationed in Kitzingen Army Airfield in Germany, serving with the 63rd Armor Regiment and the 69th Armor Regiment.

After returning to the United States, he was stationed in Marion, Illinois. From 2003 to 2004, he was stationed in Fort McCoy, Wisconsin. In 2009, he was deployed to serve in the War in Afghanistan (2001–present). Miller assumed his command in 2011 and retired in 2015.

Awards he has received include the Legion of Merit, the Bronze Star Medal, the Meritorious Service Medal with two oak leaf clusters, the Army Commendation Medal with three oak leaf clusters, the Army Reserve Components Achievement Medal with one silver oak leaf cluster, the National Defense Service Medal with service star, the Afghanistan Campaign Medal with two campaign stars, the Global War on Terrorism Service Medal, the Armed Forces Reserve Medal with silver hourglass device, mobilization device and award numeral "2"; the Army Service Ribbon, the Overseas Service Ribbon with award numeral "2", the Meritorious Unit Commendation, the Joint Meritorious Unit Award, the Commander's Cross of the Order of Merit of the Republic of Poland, and the Silver Medal of the Armed Forces in the Service of the Fatherland of Poland.

== Education ==
- Wentworth Military Academy and College
- Southern Illinois University Carbondale
- United States Army War College
