= Systems Engineering Research Center =

United States Department of Defense affiliate

Systems Engineering Research Center (SERC)
- Formation: 2008
- Type: University Affiliated Research Center (UARC)
- Headquarters: Stevens Institute of Technology, Hoboken, New Jersey
- Location: United States
- Website: sercuarc.org

The Systems Engineering Research Center (SERC) is a University Affiliated Research Center (UARC) sponsored by the United States Department of Defense (DoD). Established in 2008, SERC serves as the primary DoD center for research in systems engineering. Its research focuses on applications for the U.S. defense and intelligence sectors.

SERC is a network of more than 20 universities, led by the Stevens Institute of Technology, which manages the center's operations and research.

== History ==
The Systems Engineering Research Center was established in 2008 following a competitive selection process initiated by the DoD to create a UARC dedicated to systems engineering. The initial contract was awarded to Stevens Institute of Technology as the lead institution. Since its founding, SERC has received multiple contract renewals to continue its research, including a $60 million contract extension in 2013, a contract renewal in 2018, and a subsequent $520 million contract in 2024 to support continued research and development.

In 2018, the United States Army awarded an additional $49 million contract to SERC. SERC's executive sponsor is the Office of the Under Secretary of Defense for Research and Engineering. It also conducts research with various components across the DoD, as well as other government agencies such as the National Aeronautics and Space Administration (NASA) and the Department of Homeland Security (DHS).

== Research and activities ==
SERC's research strategy is guided by the SERC Research Council consisting of senior faculty members across the university network. SERC is also guided by advisory groups composed of senior government, industry, and academic leaders. Notable members of SERC's advisory bodies have included Michael D. Griffin, Paul G. Kaminski, Michael Wynne, and William Shepherd, a former astronaut who commanded the first mission to the International Space Station.

Major contributions to the field include the development of the Systems Engineering Body of Knowledge (SEBoK), a wiki-based resource that defines the scope and depth of the discipline. SERC's most notable current research programs include digital engineering and model-centric systems engineering, trusted systems, cyber resilience engineering, and AI4SE & SE4AI (artificial intelligence for systems engineering and systems engineering for artificial intelligence). Additionally, the first 15 years of the center's research were compiled into the book Systems Engineering for the Digital Age: Practitioner Perspectives (2024), published by Wiley.

While SERC focuses on government-funded research, it collaborates on events and knowledge exchange with organizations such as the International Council on Systems Engineering (INCOSE), the National Defense Industrial Association (NDIA), the Netherlands Organisation for Applied Scientific Research (TNO), and the German Aerospace Center (DLR).

== Organization and network ==
As a University Affiliated Research Center (UARC), SERC functions as a strategic resource for the DoD and maintains a long-term relationship with the U.S. government.

The center operates through a collaborative network of universities, which changes periodically. The current network includes:

- Air Force Institute of Technology
- Auburn University
- Colorado State University
- George Mason University
- George Washington University
- Georgetown University
- Georgia Institute of Technology
- Naval Postgraduate School
- North Carolina A&T State University
- North Carolina State University
- Ohio State University
- Old Dominion University
- Pennsylvania State University
- Purdue University
- Stevens Institute of Technology (Lead)
- Texas A&M University
- University of Alabama in Huntsville
- University of Arizona
- University of Central Florida
- University of Maryland
- University of Massachusetts Amherst
- University of Michigan
- University of Southern California
- Virginia Tech

In 2020, the Acquisition Innovation Research Center (AIRC) was established as a center within SERC, although it maintains distinct focus areas.

== See also ==
- University Affiliated Research Center
- Systems engineering
- Under Secretary of Defense for Research and Engineering
- Acquisition Innovation Research Center
