= Defense Civilian Training Corps =

American university training program

The Defense Civilian Training Corps (DCTC) is a program of the United States Department of Defense to recruit and train university students for careers as civil servants in the department. Training occurs via campus-based instruction at participating universities.

The program, which has been compared to a civilian version of the Reserve Officer Training Corps, was authorized by the National Defense Authorization Act for Fiscal Year 2020 and began operation in 2023.
