= Early Commissioning Program =

US Army training program

Early Commissioning Program (ECP) is a U.S. Army ROTC program that allows graduates of one of the nation's four Military Junior Colleges (MJC) to become commissioned officers in the reserve components (National Guard or Reserve) in two years, instead of the usual four. Upon completion at MJCs, ECP lieutenants must receive a bachelor's degree before serving as active duty officers or continuing a career in the reserve components. They must graduate within the next 24 months (waiver for one additional year may be granted by Cadet Command) after receiving early commission. While attending their universities, ECP lieutenants serve in a non-deployable status.

== History ==
Before 1966, a prospective officer in the United States Army could only gain an ROTC commission after being awarded a baccalaureate degree. However, to meet the manpower requirements of the Vietnam War, Congress approved a measure that allowed cadets at Military Junior Colleges who had completed all requirements of the ROTC Advanced Course to be commissioned as second lieutenants and called to active duty at the conclusion of their sophomore year.

In the mid-1970s, the elimination of the draft and the anti-military backlash caused by Vietnam led to officer recruiting problems, especially in the reserves. To address these concerns, the ECP was revised in 1978. Cadets from four-year schools who had successfully completed Advanced Camp and Military Science IV, but who had not yet earned their four-year degree could also be commissioned, provided they were slotted against a valid lieutenant vacancy.

Throughout the 1980s, the Early Commissioning Program played a major role in officer production. In some years, ECP officers constituted over 60% of all ROTC second lieutenants. The program is a major financial incentive for students who could receive their commissions early and serve as officers while still attending college. In 1984, the California Guard received 95% (74 out of 78) of its ROTC lieutenants from the ECP program. The Army Reserve had a similar experience.

In 1991, the downsizing of the Army reduced officer production requirements, leading to the reduction of the Early Commission Program to only the Military Junior Colleges. These schools are Georgia Military College, Marion Military Institute, New Mexico Military Institute, and Valley Forge Military Academy and College.

== Notable graduates ==
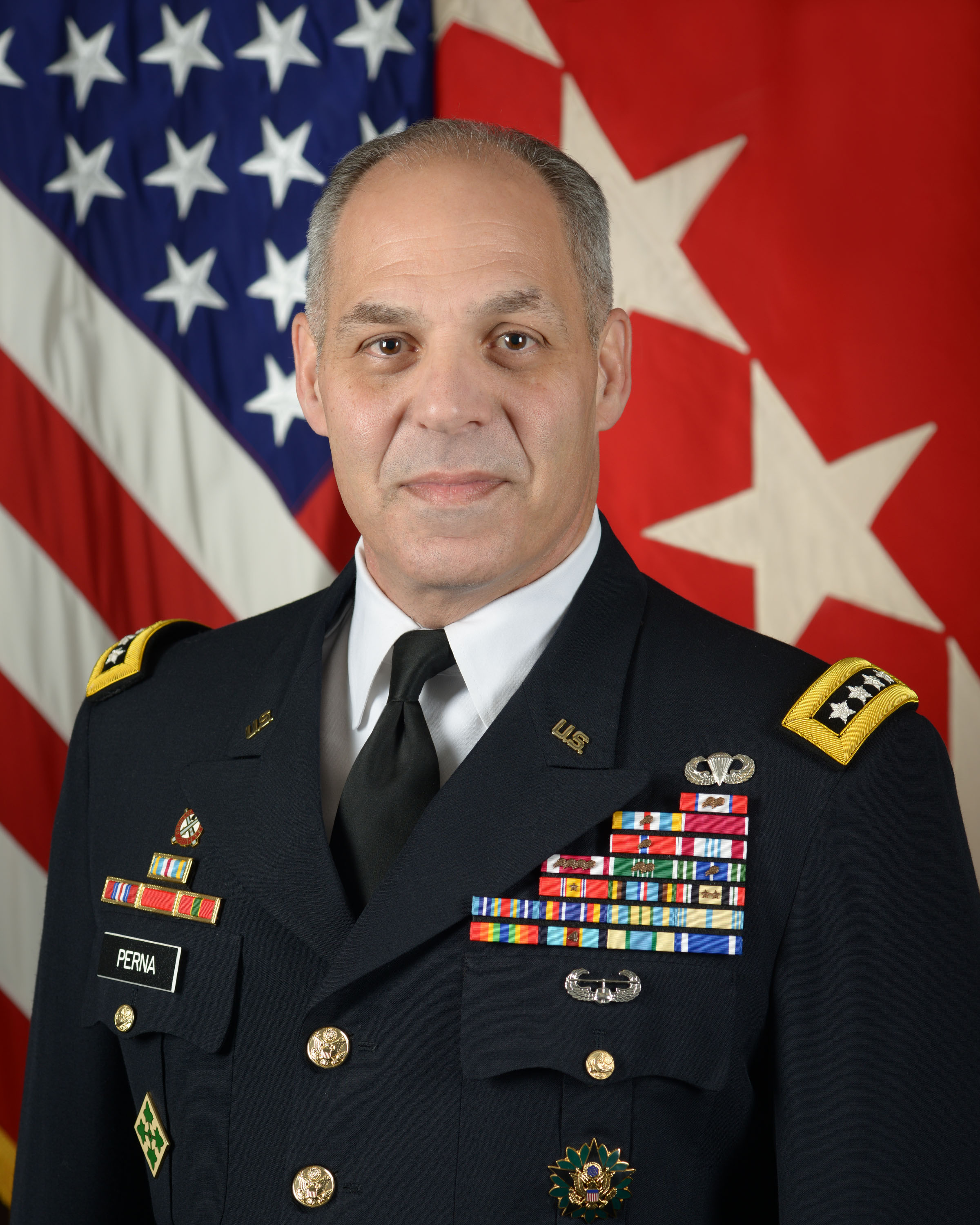
Gustave F. Perna was an ECP officer who became a United States Army four-star general

- Julio R. Banez, U.S. Army brigadier general, Assistant Adjutant General of Army Alaska National Guard.
- Matthew P. Beevers, U.S. Army major general， assistant adjutant general of California National Guard.
- Robert W. Bennett, U.S. Army brigadier general, deputy commander of U.S. Army Cadet Command
- Susan A. Davidson, U.S. Army major general, commanding general of the 8th Theater Sustainment Command.
- Scott L. Efflandt, U.S. Army brigadier general, deputy commandant of United States Army Command and General Staff College.
- William A. Hall, U.S. Army brigadier general, director of European Partnership Task Force.
- John F. King, U.S. Army brigadier general, deputy commanding general of Army National Guard.
- Francis S. Laudano III, U.S. Army brigadier general, commander of 164th Air Defense Artillery Brigade.
- Clark W. LeMasters Jr., U.S. Army major general, commanding general of the United States Army TACOM Life Cycle Management Command.
- Harry E. Miller Jr., U.S. Army Major General, mobilization assistant to the director at Defense Intelligence Agency Washington, DC.
- Johnny R. Miller, U.S. Army major general，former assistant adjutant general of Illinois Army National Guard.
- Wes Moore, U.S. Army Captain, Governor of Maryland
- Gustave F. Perna, U.S. Army general, the commander of United States Army Materiel Command.
- Dennis E. Rogers, U.S. Army brigadier general, former commander of United States Army Installation Management Command.
- Raymond F. Shields Jr., U.S. Army major general, the adjutant general of the New York National Guard.
- Kevin R. Wendel, U.S. Army major general, commander of Combined Security Transition Command in Afghanistan.
- Walter T. Lord, U.S. Army major general (retired), military advisor in residence, Austin Peay State University.
- Johnny K. Davis, U.S. Army Lieutenant General, Commanding General of Recruiting Command

== See also ==
- Military junior college
- Army Reserve Officers' Training Corps
