= Military junior college =

US military-style junior college

A military junior college (MJC) is a military-style junior college in the United States. Seven have been founded since 1842; four remain. These schools comprise one of the three major categories of Army ROTC schools whose graduates may immediately become commissioned officers in the U.S. Army. MJC graduates can earn a commission in two years, instead of the usual four, through the Early Commissioning Program (ECP). The schools also offer one-year programs that enable qualified students to earn an appointment to the U.S. service academies.

== Schools ==
Four institutions are considered military junior colleges:

- Georgia Military College, Milledgeville, Georgia, founded in 1879, includes a liberal arts junior college, a high school, and a middle school.
- Marion Military Institute, Marion, Alabama, founded in 1842, is the state military college of Alabama and nation's oldest military junior college.
- New Mexico Military Institute, Roswell, New Mexico, founded in 1891, is a four-year high school and a two-year junior college.
- Valley Forge Military College, Wayne, Pennsylvania, was founded in 1935, offers a co-ed two-year junior college program. It is the only private military junior college.
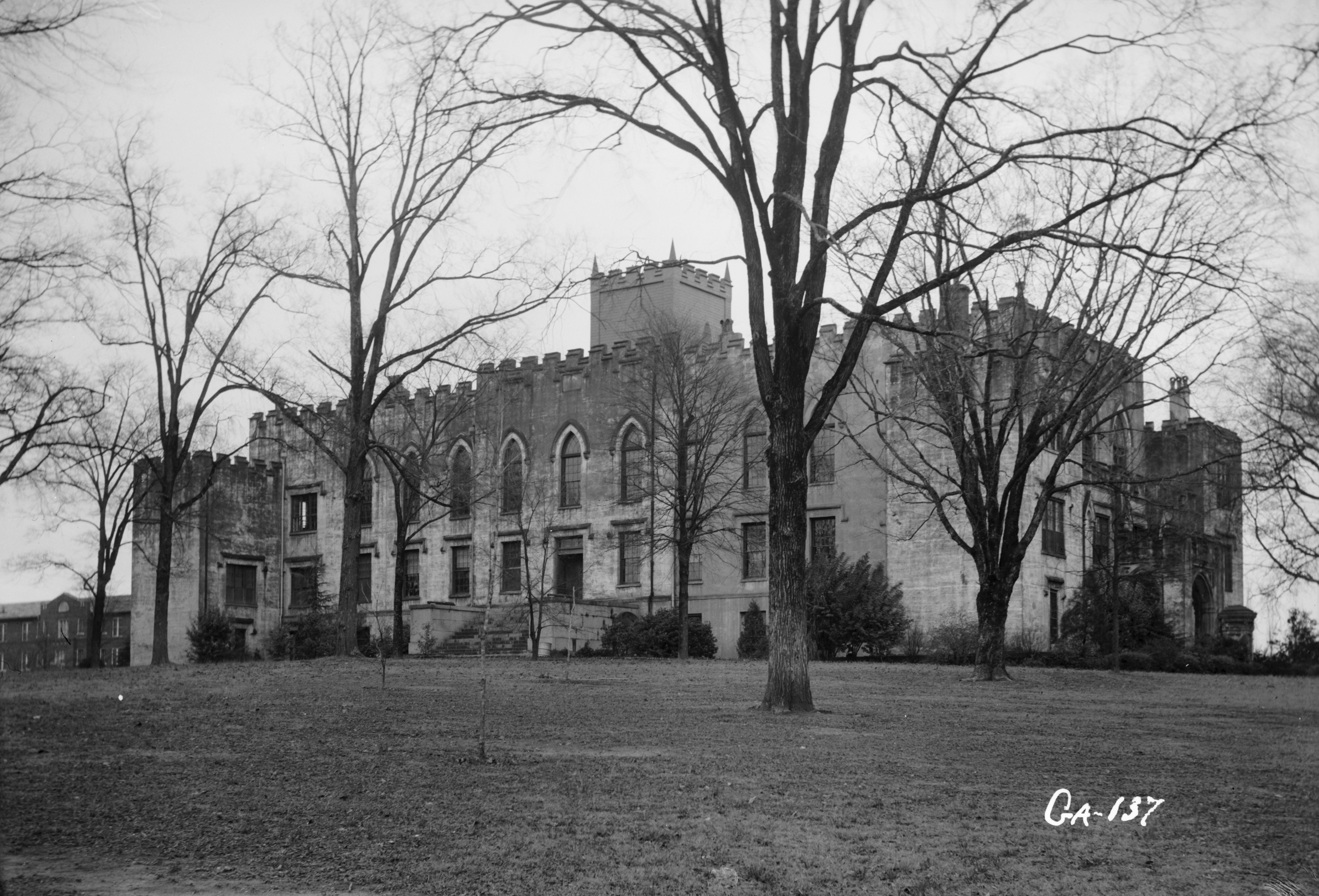
Georgia Military College

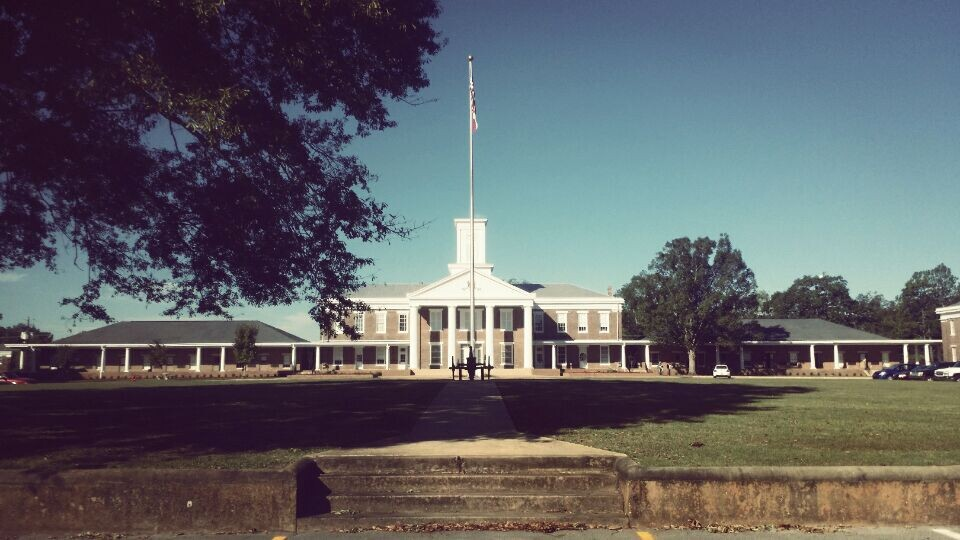
Marion Military Institute

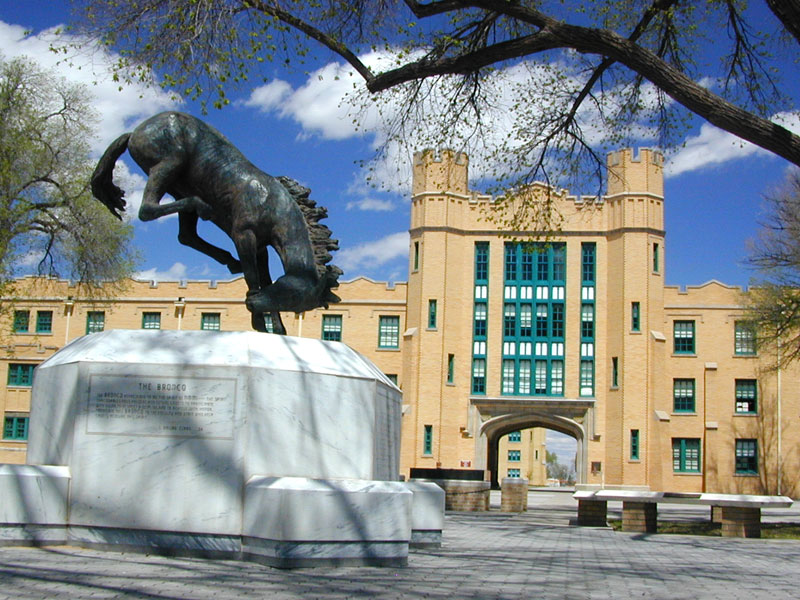
New Mexico Military Institute

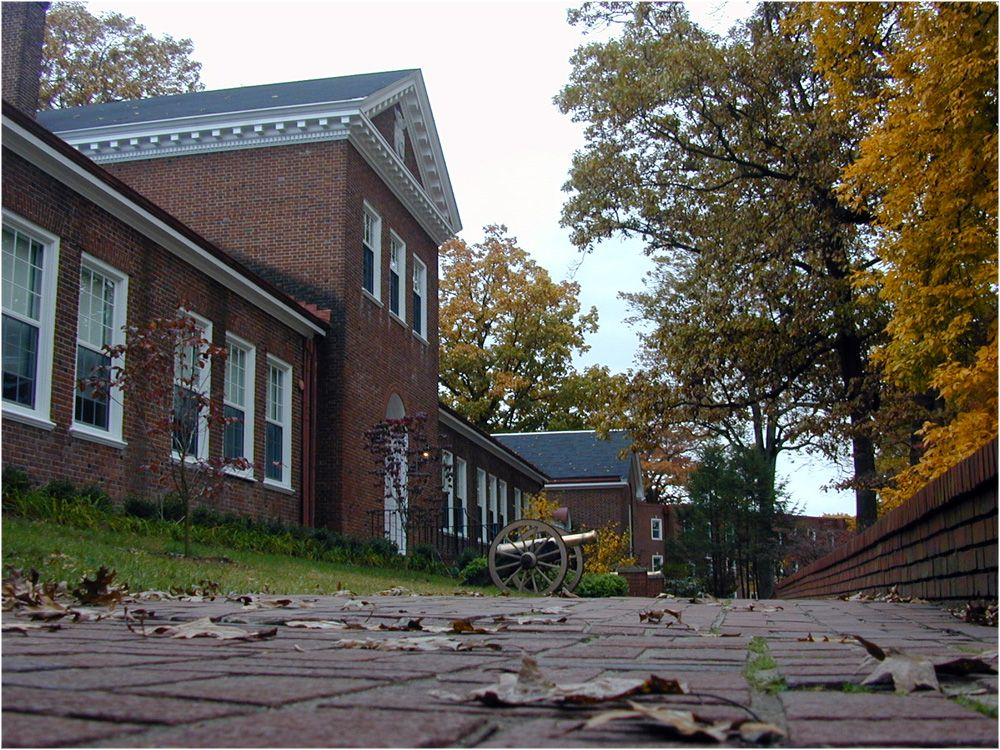
Valley Forge Military College

== Defunct MJCs ==
- Kemper Military School, Boonville, Missouri, founded in 1844, filed for bankruptcy and closed in 2002.
- Oklahoma Military Academy operated from 1919 to 1971, when it was renamed Claremore Junior College, later Rogers State College, and in 1998, Rogers State University
- Wentworth Military Academy and College, Lexington, Missouri, founded in 1880, closed in 2017 due to financial difficulties.

== See also ==
- Early Commissioning Program
- Senior Military College
- Army Reserve Officers' Training Corps
