= Harvard ROTC =

- Active: Founded in 1916
- Country: United States of America
- Allegiance: United States Navy, United States Army
- Role: Officer Training
- Garrison/HQ: Cambridge, Massachusetts

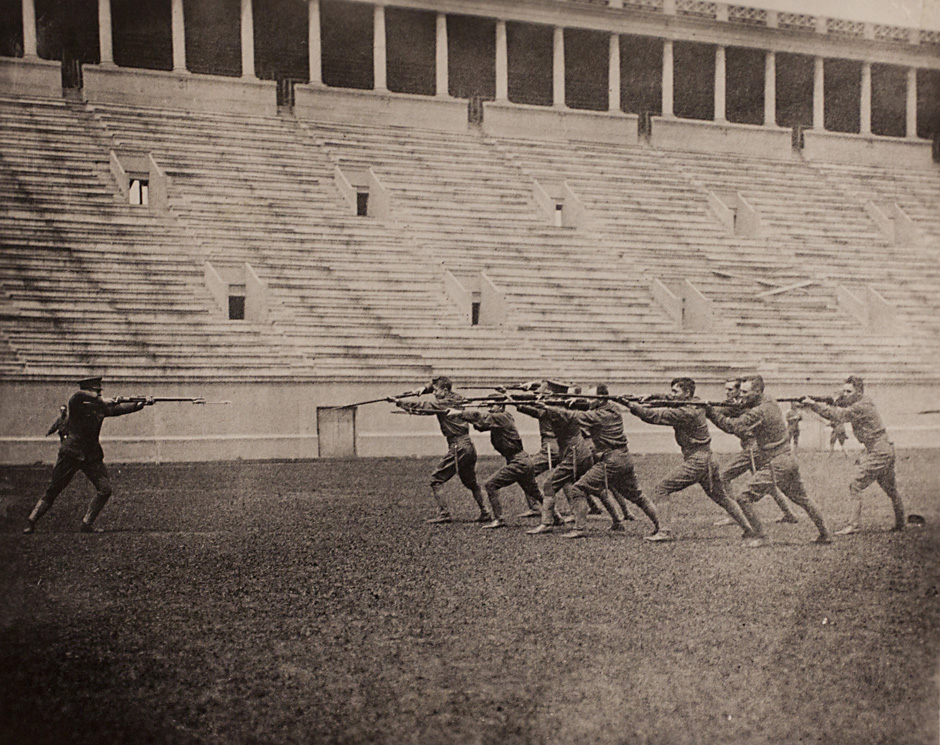
Bayonet Drill, Harvard ROTC at Stadium, 1917-1918

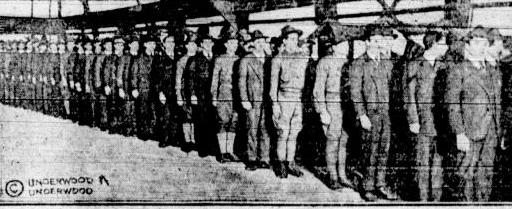
Military drill in 1916

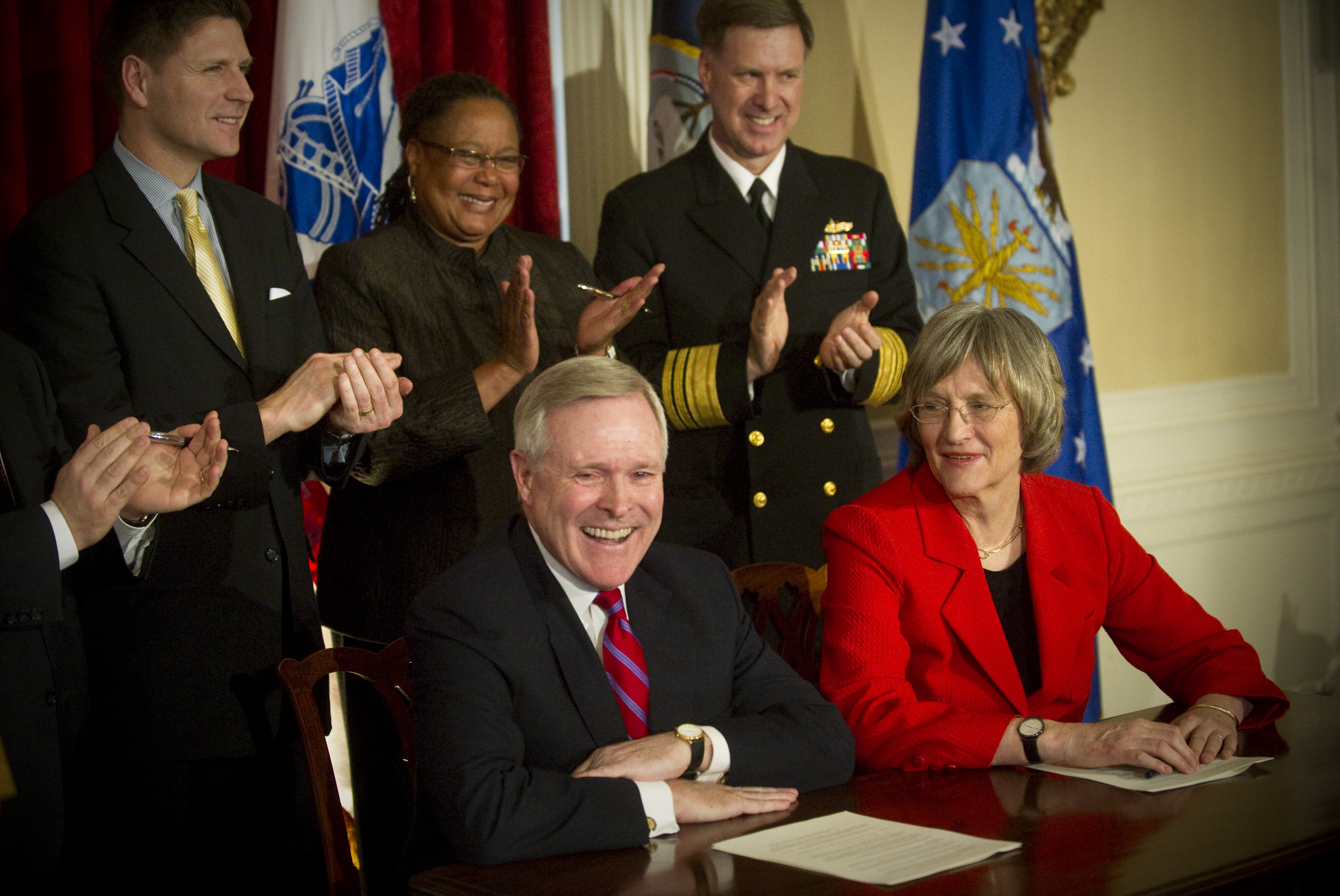
Secretary of the Navy (SECNAV) the Honorable Ray Mabus, left, and Harvard President Drew Faust sign a Memorandum of Agreement Restoring ROTC to Harvard

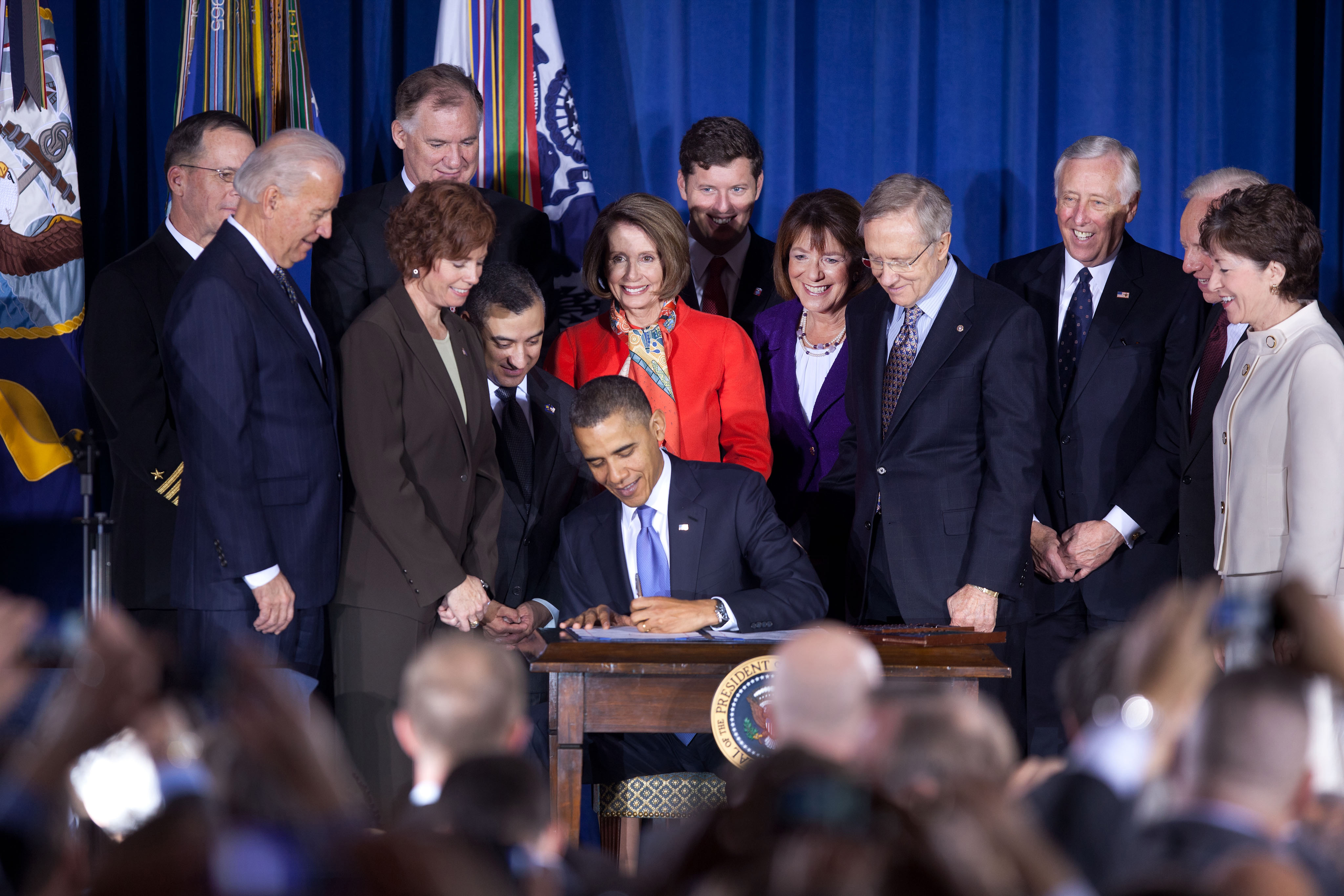
President Obama signs the repeal of DADT into law.

Harvard ROTC was one of the first Reserve Officers' Training Corps (ROTC) units in the country, founded in 1916. The original program was led by Captain Constant Cordier. By the fall of 1952 forty percent of the incoming freshmen class at Harvard University enrolled in programs that led to a ROTC commission.

Harvard has the third most graduates who have received the Medal of Honor. With eighteen recipients, only West Point and the US Naval Academy have more.

In 1969, in the middle of sometimes violent protests over the Vietnam War, Harvard downgraded the status of ROTC to an extracurricular activity. The cited reason was over academic standards on coursework. The military's official departure from Harvard began in the years that followed. For the next several decades Harvard's connection to ROTC was by allowing their students to take ROTC courses at Massachusetts Institute of Technology.

By 1994, in the midst of the controversy over the Don't Ask Don't Tell (DADT) law on homosexuality, Harvard committed to upholding ROTC ties, but only through indirect alumni contributions. This compromise prevented all ties from being severed as was recommended in the 1992 faculty committee report.

Harvard University President Drew Faust promised a return of ROTC to campus, once DADT was repealed, in a speech with Chairman of the Joint Chiefs Admiral Mike Mullen at the Kennedy School of Government on 17 November 2010. In December 2010 Congress passed a bill to repeal President Bill Clinton’s 1993 DADT Policy.

On March 4, 2011, Harvard University President Drew Faust signed an agreement with Navy Secretary Ray Mabus formally recognizing the return of Naval ROTC to Harvard’s campus. According to the agreement's terms, a Director of Naval ROTC would be appointed, and Harvard would provide funding for the program. The Navy agreement was structured to go into effect when the repeal of DADT was implemented, and was followed by a similar agreement with the Army. President Barack Obama, who in his 2011 State of the Union address called on all universities to open their doors to ROTC, responded through his spokesman by saying:

With our nation at war, this sends a powerful message that Americans stand united and that our colleges, society and armed forces are stronger when we honor the contributions of all our citizens, especially our troops and military families who sacrifice for our freedoms. As the president said in the State of the Union, it is time to move forward as one nation.

— Jay Carney, President Obama’s Spokesman

== Harvard Medal of Honor recipients ==
Name	Rank	Service	Conflict	School
Manning F. Force	Major General	US Army	American Civil War	Harvard College (1845) and Harvard Law School (1848)
Charles E. Phelps	Brigadier General	US Army	American Civil War	Harvard Law School (1853)
Horace Porter	Brigadier General	US Army	American Civil War	Harvard Lawrence Scientific School (1857)
Richard J. Curran	Major	US Army	American Civil War	Harvard Medical School (1859)
Henry Shippen Huidekoper	Major General	US Army	American Civil War	Harvard College (1862)
Hazard Stevens	Brigadier General	US Army	American Civil War	Harvard College (1865)
Henry W. Lawton	Major General	US Army	American Civil War	Harvard Law School (1866)
Wilmon W. Blackmar	Brigadier General	US Army	American Civil War	Harvard Law School (1867)
Leonard Wood	Major General	US Army	Apache Campaign	Harvard Medical School (1884)
Theodore Roosevelt	Colonel	US Army	Spanish–American War	Harvard College (1880)
Walter Hill	Brigadier General	US Marine Corps	VeraCruz, Mexico	Harvard College (1880)
George G. McMurtry	Major	US Army	World War I	Harvard College (1899)
Charles W. Whittlesey	Lieutenant Colonel	US Army	World War I	Harvard Law School (1908)
Claud A. Jones	Rear Admiral	US Navy	USS Memphis (CA-10) destroyed near Santo Domingo City	Harvard Graduate School of Applied Science (1913)
Pierpont M. Hamilton	Major General	US Air Force	World War II	Harvard College (1920)
Theodore Roosevelt II	Brigadier General	US Army	World War II	Harvard College (1909)
Sherrod E. Skinner	2nd Lieutenant	US Marine Corps	Korean War	Harvard College (1951)
Robert C. Murray	Staff Sergeant	US Army	Vietnam War	Harvard Business School (1970) (Attended but did not graduate.)

== Notable alumni ==
- Anthony Brown, Harvard College (1984) and Harvard Law School (1992), U.S. Representative (MD-4) and Colonel in the U.S. Army Reserve.
- Eliot A. Cohen, Harvard College (1977) and Harvard University (Ph.D. 1982), Counselor in the U.S. Department of State (2007–2009), Director of the Strategic Studies Program at the Paul H. Nitze School of Advanced International Studies of the Johns Hopkins University.
- Paul G. Kirk, Harvard College (1960) and Harvard Law School (1964), Chairman of the Democratic National Committee (1985–1989), U.S. Senator from Massachusetts (2009–2010).
